= 1983 Grand Prix (tennis) =

Tennis circuit

1983 Grand Prix circuit
Details
- Duration: 10 January 1983 – 10 January 1984
- Edition: 14th
- Tournaments: 70
- Categories: Grand Slam (4); Grand Prix Series (65) * Super Series * Regular Series; Team Events (1)

Achievements (singles)
- Most titles: (Sweden) Mats Wilander (9)
- Most finals: (Czechoslovakia) Ivan Lendl (13)
- Prize money leader: (Czechoslovakia) Ivan Lendl ($1,747,128)
- Points leader: (Sweden) Mats Wilander (3,101) (Note: John McEnroe was the ATP points leader with a points average of 129.92, calculated over all tournaments with at least $25,000 prize money, a 32-player singles draw, and a merit-based entry system.)

Awards
- Player of the year: (United States) John McEnroe
- Most improved player of the year: (United States) Jimmy Arias
- Newcomer of the year: (United States) Scott Davis

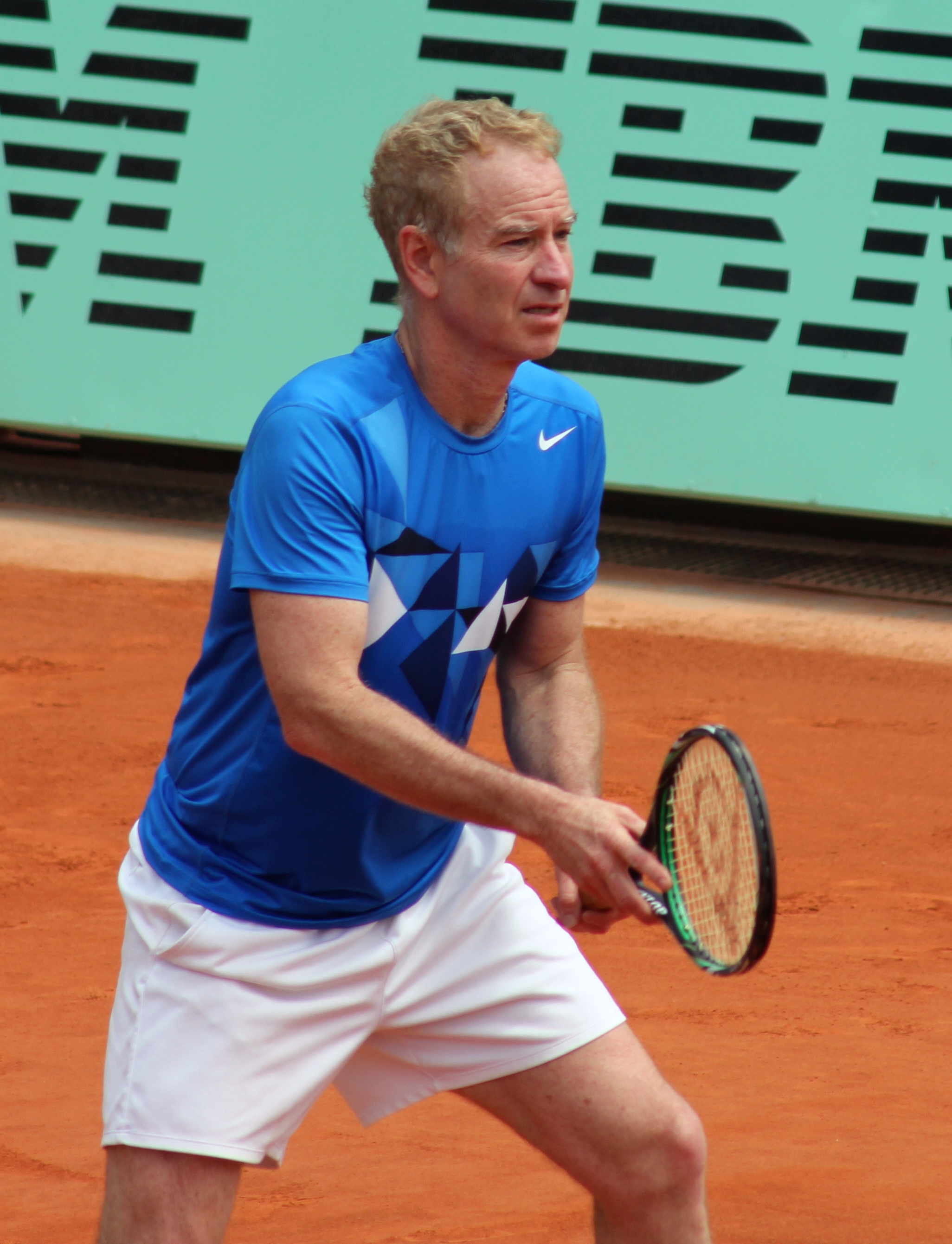
John McEnroe finished the year as ATP world No. 1 for the third time in his career. McEnroe won six titles during the season, including a major at the Wimbedon Championships, as well as the Masters Grand Prix.

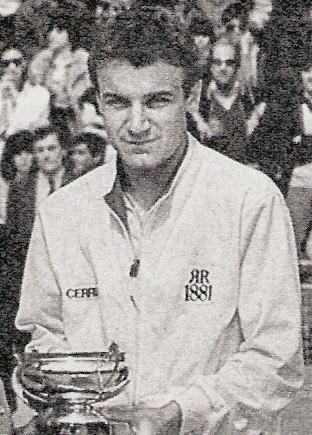
Mats Wilander was the 1983 Grand Prix No. 1. Wilander won nine tournaments during the season, including a major at the Australian Open, and finished runner-up at another major, the French Open.

The 1983 Volvo Grand Prix was a professional tennis circuit held that year. It incorporated the four grand slam tournaments, the Grand Prix tournaments, and two team tournaments (the Davis Cup and the World Team Cup). The circuit was administered by the Men's International Professional Tennis Council (MIPTC).

== Schedule ==
The table below shows the 1983 Volvo Grand Prix schedule (a precursor to the ATP Tour).

Key

Grand Slam tournaments
Tour finals
Super Series
Regular Series

=== January ===
| Week | Tournament | Champions | Runners-up | Semifinalists | Quarterfinalists |
|---|---|---|---|---|---|
| 10 Jan | Benson & Hedges Open; Auckland, New Zealand; Hard – $75,000 – 32S/16D; Singles – Doubles | (Australia) John Alexander; 6–4, 6–3, 6–3 | (New Zealand) Russell Simpson | (New Zealand) Chris Lewis (Australia) Rod Frawley | (United States) Dave Siegler (South Africa) Bernard Mitton (Australia) Broderick Dyke (New Zealand) Jeff Simpson |
| 10 Jan | Benson & Hedges Open; Auckland, New Zealand; Hard – $75,000 – 32S/16D; Singles – Doubles | (New Zealand) Chris Lewis (New Zealand) Russell Simpson; 7–6, 6–3 | (Australia) David Graham (Australia) Laurie Warder | (New Zealand) Chris Lewis (Australia) Rod Frawley | (United States) Dave Siegler (South Africa) Bernard Mitton (Australia) Broderick Dyke (New Zealand) Jeff Simpson |
| 24 Jan | Guarujá, Brazil; Hard – $255,000 – 64S/32D | (Argentina) José Luis Clerc; 3–6, 7–5, 6–1 | (Sweden) Mats Wilander | (Belgium) Bernard Boileau (Czechoslovakia) Tomáš Šmíd | (Paraguay) Francisco González (Ecuador) Andrés Gómez (United States) Pat Du Pré (India) Ramesh Krishnan |
| 24 Jan | Guarujá, Brazil; Hard – $255,000 – 64S/32D | (Czechoslovakia) Tomáš Šmíd (United States) Tim Gullikson; 5–7, 7–6, 6–3 | (Israel) Shlomo Glickstein (United States) Van Winitsky | (Belgium) Bernard Boileau (Czechoslovakia) Tomáš Šmíd | (Paraguay) Francisco González (Ecuador) Andrés Gómez (United States) Pat Du Pré (India) Ramesh Krishnan |
| 31 Jan | Cacharel Caracas Open; Caracas, Venezuela; Hard – $75,000 – 32S/16D | (Mexico) Raúl Ramírez; 6–4, 6–2 | (United States) Morris Skip Strode | (Paraguay) Francisco González (Sweden) Stefan Simonsson | (United States) Nick Saviano (United States) David Dowlen (United States) Stan Smith (United States) Tim Gullikson |
| 31 Jan | Cacharel Caracas Open; Caracas, Venezuela; Hard – $75,000 – 32S/16D | (United States) Stan Smith (Chile) Jaime Fillol; 6–7, 6–4, 6–3 | (Ecuador) Andrés Gómez (Romania) Ilie Năstase | (Paraguay) Francisco González (Sweden) Stefan Simonsson | (United States) Nick Saviano (United States) David Dowlen (United States) Stan Smith (United States) Tim Gullikson |
| 31 Jan | U.S. Pro Indoor; Philadelphia, US; Super Series; Carpet – $375,000 – 48S/32D; Singles – Doubles | (United States) John McEnroe; 4–6, 7–6^{(9–7)}, 6–4, 6–3 | (Czechoslovakia) Ivan Lendl | (United States) Tim Mayotte (United States) Bill Scanlon | (United States) Eliot Teltscher (United States) Brian Gottfried (Australia) Peter McNamara (Poland) Wojciech Fibak |
| 31 Jan | U.S. Pro Indoor; Philadelphia, US; Super Series; Carpet – $375,000 – 48S/32D; Singles – Doubles | (South Africa) Kevin Curren (United States) Steve Denton; 4–6, 7–6, 7–6 | (United States) Peter Fleming (United States) John McEnroe | (United States) Tim Mayotte (United States) Bill Scanlon | (United States) Eliot Teltscher (United States) Brian Gottfried (Australia) Peter McNamara (Poland) Wojciech Fibak |

=== February ===
| Week | Tournament | Champions | Runners-up | Semifinalists | Quarterfinalists |
|---|---|---|---|---|---|
| 14 Feb | U.S. National Indoor Championships; Memphis, Tennessee, US; Super Series; Carpet – $315,000 – 48S/24D | (United States) Jimmy Connors; 7–5, 6–0 | (United States) Gene Mayer | (Australia) Peter McNamara (United States) Brian Gottfried | (United States) Eliot Teltscher (France) Yannick Noah (United States) Brian Teacher (Australia) Paul McNamee |
| 14 Feb | U.S. National Indoor Championships; Memphis, Tennessee, US; Super Series; Carpet – $315,000 – 48S/24D | (Australia) Peter McNamara (Australia) Paul McNamee; 6–3, 5–7, 6–4 | (United States) Tim Gullikson (United States) Tom Gullikson | (Australia) Peter McNamara (United States) Brian Gottfried | (United States) Eliot Teltscher (France) Yannick Noah (United States) Brian Teacher (Australia) Paul McNamee |
| 14 Feb | Viña del Mar, Chile; Clay – $75,000 – 32S/16D | (Paraguay) Víctor Pecci; 2–6, 7–5, 6–4 | (Chile) Jaime Fillol | (Peru) Pablo Arraya (Chile) Ricardo Acuña | (France) Loïc Courteau (Bolivia) Mario Martínez (West Germany) Damir Keretić (Chile) Hans Gildemeister |
| 14 Feb | Viña del Mar, Chile; Clay – $75,000 – 32S/16D | (Chile) Belus Prajoux (Chile) Hans Gildemeister; 6–3, 6–1 | (Brazil) Júlio Góes (Brazil) Ney Keller | (Peru) Pablo Arraya (Chile) Ricardo Acuña | (France) Loïc Courteau (Bolivia) Mario Martínez (West Germany) Damir Keretić (Chile) Hans Gildemeister |
| 21 Feb | La Quinta, California, US; Super Series; Hard – $255,000 – 64S/32D | (Spain) José Higueras; 6–4, 6–2 | (United States) Eliot Teltscher | (United States) Mike Bauer (France) Yannick Noah | (United States) Brad Gilbert (United States) Sandy Mayer (United States) Victor Amaya (United States) Robert Van't Hof |
| 21 Feb | La Quinta, California, US; Super Series; Hard – $255,000 – 64S/32D | (Mexico) Raúl Ramírez (United States) Brian Gottfried; 7–6, 6–4 | (India) Anand Amritraj (United States) Johan Kriek | (United States) Mike Bauer (France) Yannick Noah | (United States) Brad Gilbert (United States) Sandy Mayer (United States) Victor Amaya (United States) Robert Van't Hof |
| 28 Feb | Monterrey Cup; Monterrey, Mexico; Carpet – $75,000 – 32S/16D | (United States) Sammy Giammalva; 6–4, 3–6, 6–3 | (United States) Ben Testerman | (United States) Erick Iskersky (Nigeria) Nduka Odizor | (United States) Terry Moor (United States) John Sadri (Mexico) Juan Hernández (United States) Nick Saviano |
| 28 Feb | Monterrey Cup; Monterrey, Mexico; Carpet – $75,000 – 32S/16D | (Nigeria) Nduka Odizor (United States) David Dowlen; 3–6, 6–3, 6–4 | (United States) Andy Andrews (United States) John Sadri | (United States) Erick Iskersky (Nigeria) Nduka Odizor | (United States) Terry Moor (United States) John Sadri (Mexico) Juan Hernández (United States) Nick Saviano |
| 28 Feb | Davis Cup first round Moscow, Soviet Union – carpet (i); Asunción, Paraguay – carpet (i); Adelaide, Australia – grass Timișoara, Romania – hard (i); Bjärred, Sweden – carpet (i); Christchurch, New Zealand – grass Reggio Calabria, Italy – clay Buenos Aires, Argentina – clay | First Round Winners; France 3–2; Paraguay 4–1; Australia 3–2; Romania 5–0; Sweden 5–0; New Zealand 5–0; Italy 3–2; Argentina 3–2 | First Round Losers; Soviet Union; Czechoslovakia; Great Britain; Chile; Indonesia; Denmark; Ireland; United States | | |

=== March ===
| Week | Tournament | Champions | Runners-up | Semifinalists | Quarterfinalists |
|---|---|---|---|---|---|
| 7 Mar | Donnay Indoor; Brussels, Belgium; Carpet – $265,000 – 32S/16D; Singles – Doubles | (Australia) Peter McNamara; 6–4, 4–6, 7–6 | (Czechoslovakia) Ivan Lendl | (Sweden) Mats Wilander (United States) Vitas Gerulaitis | (United States) Johan Kriek (France) Yannick Noah (United States) Steve Denton (South Africa) Kevin Curren |
| 7 Mar | Donnay Indoor; Brussels, Belgium; Carpet – $265,000 – 32S/16D; Singles – Doubles | (Switzerland) Heinz Günthardt (Hungary) Balázs Taróczy; 6–2, 6–4 | (Sweden) Hans Simonsson (Sweden) Mats Wilander | (Sweden) Mats Wilander (United States) Vitas Gerulaitis | (United States) Johan Kriek (France) Yannick Noah (United States) Steve Denton (South Africa) Kevin Curren |
| 7 Mar | Lorraine Open; Nancy, France; Hard – $75,000 – 32S/16D; Singles – Doubles | (United States) Nick Saviano; 6–4, 4–6, 6–3 | (United States) Chip Hooper | (Poland) Wojciech Fibak (South Africa) Danie Visser | (United States) Victor Amaya (Australia) Wally Masur (United States) Tom Cain (United States) Bill Scanlon |
| 7 Mar | Lorraine Open; Nancy, France; Hard – $75,000 – 32S/16D; Singles – Doubles | (Sweden) Anders Järryd (Sweden) Jan Gunnarsson; 7–5, 6–3 | (Chile) Ricardo Acuña (Chile) Belus Prajoux | (Poland) Wojciech Fibak (South Africa) Danie Visser | (United States) Victor Amaya (Australia) Wally Masur (United States) Tom Cain (United States) Bill Scanlon |
| 14 Mar | ABN World Tennis Tournament; Rotterdam, Netherlands; Hard – $200,000 – 32S/16D; Singles – Doubles | (United States) Gene Mayer; 6–1, 7–6^{(11–9)} | (Argentina) Guillermo Vilas | (Australia) John Fitzgerald (United States) Fritz Buehning | (United States) Tim Wilkison (United States) Nick Saviano (United States) Hank Pfister (United States) Vince Van Patten |
| 14 Mar | ABN World Tennis Tournament; Rotterdam, Netherlands; Hard – $200,000 – 32S/16D; Singles – Doubles | (United States) Tom Gullikson (United States) Fritz Buehning; 7–6, 4–6, 7–6 | (United States) Peter Fleming (Czechoslovakia) Pavel Složil | (Australia) John Fitzgerald (United States) Fritz Buehning | (United States) Tim Wilkison (United States) Nick Saviano (United States) Hank Pfister (United States) Vince Van Patten |
| 21 Mar | Cuore Cup; Milan, Italy; Super Series; Carpet – $365,000 – 32S/16D | (Czechoslovakia) Ivan Lendl; 5–7, 6–3, 7–6^{(7–4)} | (South Africa) Kevin Curren | (United States) Chip Hooper (United States) Bill Scanlon | (United States) Sandy Mayer (Sweden) Thomas Högstedt (Czechoslovakia) Tomáš Šmíd (South Africa) Eddie Edwards |
| 21 Mar | Cuore Cup; Milan, Italy; Super Series; Carpet – $365,000 – 32S/16D | (Czechoslovakia) Tomáš Šmíd (Czechoslovakia) Pavel Složil; 6–2, 5–7, 6–4 | (United States) Fritz Buehning (United States) Peter Fleming | (United States) Chip Hooper (United States) Bill Scanlon | (United States) Sandy Mayer (Sweden) Thomas Högstedt (Czechoslovakia) Tomáš Šmíd (South Africa) Eddie Edwards |
| 21 Mar | Donnay Open; Nice, France; Clay – $75,000 – 32S/16D; Singles – Doubles | (Sweden) Henrik Sundström; 7–5, 4–6, 6–3 | (Spain) Manuel Orantes | (Bolivia) Mario Martínez (Spain) Fernando Luna | (France) Christophe Casa (Spain) Juan Avendaño (United States) Jimmy Brown (France) Thierry Tulasne |
| 21 Mar | Donnay Open; Nice, France; Clay – $75,000 – 32S/16D; Singles – Doubles | (Czechoslovakia) Libor Pimek (Belgium) Bernard Boileau; 6–3, 6–4 | (France) Bernard Fritz (France) Jean-Louis Haillet | (Bolivia) Mario Martínez (Spain) Fernando Luna | (France) Christophe Casa (Spain) Juan Avendaño (United States) Jimmy Brown (France) Thierry Tulasne |
| 28 Mar | Monte Carlo Open; Roquebrune-Cap-Martin, France; Super Series; Clay – $300,000 – 32S/16D | (Sweden) Mats Wilander; 6–1, 6–2, 6–3 | (United States) Mel Purcell | (Spain) Manuel Orantes (Italy) Corrado Barazzutti | (Israel) Shlomo Glickstein (France) Yannick Noah (France) Henri Leconte (Argentina) Guillermo Vilas |
| 28 Mar | Monte Carlo Open; Roquebrune-Cap-Martin, France; Super Series; Clay – $300,000 – 32S/16D | (Hungary) Balázs Taróczy (Switzerland) Heinz Günthardt; 6–2, 6–4 | (France) Henri Leconte (France) Yannick Noah | (Spain) Manuel Orantes (Italy) Corrado Barazzutti | (Israel) Shlomo Glickstein (France) Yannick Noah (France) Henri Leconte (Argentina) Guillermo Vilas |

=== April ===
| Week | Tournament | Champions | Runners-up | Semifinalists | Quarterfinalists |
|---|---|---|---|---|---|
| 4 Apr | Lights Cup; Lisbon, Portugal; Clay – $50,000 – 32S/16D; Singles – Doubles | (Sweden) Mats Wilander; 2–6, 7–6, 6–4 | (France) Yannick Noah | (Spain) José Higueras (Czechoslovakia) Libor Pimek | (Israel) Shlomo Glickstein (Italy) Corrado Barazzutti (Sweden) Anders Järryd (Paraguay) Víctor Pecci |
| 4 Apr | Lights Cup; Lisbon, Portugal; Clay – $50,000 – 32S/16D; Singles – Doubles | (Brazil) Cássio Motta (Brazil) Carlos Kirmayr; 7–5, 6–4 | (Czechoslovakia) Pavel Složil (United States) Ferdi Taygan | (Spain) José Higueras (Czechoslovakia) Libor Pimek | (Israel) Shlomo Glickstein (Italy) Corrado Barazzutti (Sweden) Anders Järryd (Paraguay) Víctor Pecci |
| 11 Apr | Aix-en-Provence, France; Clay – $75,000 – 32S/16D | (Sweden) Mats Wilander; 6–3, 6–2 | (Spain) Sergio Casal | (Sweden) Joakim Nyström (France) Henri Leconte | (Paraguay) Víctor Pecci (Argentina) Alejandro Ganzábal (France) Loïc Courteau (Colombia) Jairo Velasco, Sr. |
| 11 Apr | Aix-en-Provence, France; Clay – $75,000 – 32S/16D | (France) Gilles Moretton (France) Henri Leconte; 2–6, 6–1, 6–2 | (Chile) Iván Camus (Spain) Sergio Casal | (Sweden) Joakim Nyström (France) Henri Leconte | (Paraguay) Víctor Pecci (Argentina) Alejandro Ganzábal (France) Loïc Courteau (Colombia) Jairo Velasco, Sr. |
| 11 Apr | Union 76 Pacific Southwest Open; Los Angeles, US; Hard – $255,000 – 64S/32D | (United States) Gene Mayer; 7–6, 6–1 | (United States) Johan Kriek | (United States) Jimmy Connors (United States) Brian Gottfried | (United States) Sandy Mayer (United States) Hank Pfister (United States) Mike De Palmer (United States) Tim Mayotte |
| 11 Apr | Union 76 Pacific Southwest Open; Los Angeles, US; Hard – $255,000 – 64S/32D | (United States) John McEnroe (United States) Peter Fleming; 6–1, 6–2 | (United States) Sandy Mayer (United States) Ferdi Taygan | (United States) Jimmy Connors (United States) Brian Gottfried | (United States) Sandy Mayer (United States) Hank Pfister (United States) Mike De Palmer (United States) Tim Mayotte |
| 18 Apr | Bournemouth, England; Clay – $125,000 – 32S/16D | (Spain) José Higueras; 2–6, 7–6, 7–5 | (Czechoslovakia) Tomáš Šmíd | (Sweden) Stefan Edberg (Paraguay) Víctor Pecci | (Chile) Jaime Fillol (Hungary) Balázs Taróczy (Israel) Shlomo Glickstein (United Kingdom) Buster Mottram |
| 18 Apr | Bournemouth, England; Clay – $125,000 – 32S/16D | (United States) Sherwood Stewart (Czechoslovakia) Tomáš Šmíd; 7–6, 7–5 | (Switzerland) Heinz Günthardt (Hungary) Balázs Taróczy | (Sweden) Stefan Edberg (Paraguay) Víctor Pecci | (Chile) Jaime Fillol (Hungary) Balázs Taróczy (Israel) Shlomo Glickstein (United Kingdom) Buster Mottram |
| 24 Apr | Alan King Tennis Classic; Las Vegas, Nevada, US; Hard – $300,000 – 32S/16D | (United States) Jimmy Connors; 7–6^{(7–4)}, 6–1 | (Australia) Mark Edmondson | (United States) Hank Pfister (United States) Robert Van't Hof | (United States) Steve Denton (Mexico) Raúl Ramírez (United States) Sandy Mayer (United States) Sammy Giammalva |
| 24 Apr | Alan King Tennis Classic; Las Vegas, Nevada, US; Hard – $300,000 – 32S/16D | (United States) Steve Denton (South Africa) Kevin Curren; 6–3, 7–5 | (United States) Tracy Delatte (United States) Johan Kriek | (United States) Hank Pfister (United States) Robert Van't Hof | (United States) Steve Denton (Mexico) Raúl Ramírez (United States) Sandy Mayer (United States) Sammy Giammalva |
| 25 Apr | Madrid Grand Prix Trofeo; Madrid, Spain; Clay – $265,000 – 32S/16D | (France) Yannick Noah; 3–6, 6–0, 6–2, 6–4 | (Sweden) Henrik Sundström | (Czechoslovakia) Pavel Složil (Switzerland) Heinz Günthardt | (France) Thierry Tulasne (Spain) Alberto Tous (Brazil) Carlos Kirmayr (Chile) Hans Gildemeister |
| 25 Apr | Madrid Grand Prix Trofeo; Madrid, Spain; Clay – $265,000 – 32S/16D | (Czechoslovakia) Pavel Složil (Switzerland) Heinz Günthardt; 6–3, 6–3 | (Switzerland) Markus Günthardt (Hungary) Zoltán Kuhárszky | (Czechoslovakia) Pavel Složil (Switzerland) Heinz Günthardt | (France) Thierry Tulasne (Spain) Alberto Tous (Brazil) Carlos Kirmayr (Chile) Hans Gildemeister |
| 25 Apr | Robinson's Tennis Open; Tampa, Florida, US; Carpet – $75,000 – S16 | (United States) Johan Kriek; 6–2, 6–4 | (United States) Robert Lutz | (Romania) Florin Segărceanu (United States) Mike De Palmer | (Australia) John Fitzgerald (United States) Tom Cain (United States) Fritz Buehning (United States) Tim Wilkison |
| 25 Apr | Robinson's Tennis Open; Tampa, Florida, US; Carpet – $75,000 – S16 | (United States) Steve Meister (United States) Tony Giammalva; 3–6, 6–1, 7–5 | (United States) Eric Fromm (United States) Drew Gitlin | (Romania) Florin Segărceanu (United States) Mike De Palmer | (Australia) John Fitzgerald (United States) Tom Cain (United States) Fritz Buehning (United States) Tim Wilkison |

=== May ===
| Week | Tournament | Champions | Runners-up | Semifinalists | Quarterfinalists |
|---|---|---|---|---|---|
| 2 May | World Team Cup; Düsseldorf, West Germany; Clay – $450,000 – 16S/8D | Spain; 2–1 | Australia | United States; New Zealand | Sweden; Chile; West Germany; France |
| 9 May | Roger Gallet Cup; Florence, Italy; Clay – $75,000 – 32S/16D | (United States) Jimmy Arias; 6–4, 6–3 | (Italy) Francesco Cancellotti | (United States) Eddie Dibbs (Sweden) Stefan Simonsson | (France) Georges Goven (Argentina) Ricardo Cano (Spain) Ángel Giménez (France) Thierry Tulasne |
| 9 May | Roger Gallet Cup; Florence, Italy; Clay – $75,000 – 32S/16D | (Paraguay) Víctor Pecci (Paraguay) Francisco González; 4–6, 6–4, 7–6 | (France) Dominique Bedel (France) Bernard Fritz | (United States) Eddie Dibbs (Sweden) Stefan Simonsson | (France) Georges Goven (Argentina) Ricardo Cano (Spain) Ángel Giménez (France) Thierry Tulasne |
| 9 May | German Open; Hamburg, West Germany; Clay – $300,000 – 56S/28D | (France) Yannick Noah; 3–6, 7–5, 6–2, 6–0 | (Spain) José Higueras | (United States) Eric Fromm (Argentina) Guillermo Vilas | (Hungary) Balázs Taróczy (Sweden) Mats Wilander (United States) Eliot Teltscher (United States) Jeff Borowiak |
| 9 May | German Open; Hamburg, West Germany; Clay – $300,000 – 56S/28D | (Hungary) Balázs Taróczy (Switzerland) Heinz Günthardt; 7–6, 4–6, 6–4 | (Australia) Mark Edmondson (United States) Brian Gottfried | (United States) Eric Fromm (Argentina) Guillermo Vilas | (Hungary) Balázs Taróczy (Sweden) Mats Wilander (United States) Eliot Teltscher (United States) Jeff Borowiak |
| 16 May | Italian Open; Rome, Italy; Clay – $375,000 – 56S/32D | (United States) Jimmy Arias; 6–2, 6–7, 6–2, 6–4 | (Spain) José Higueras | (Sweden) Stefan Simonsson (Switzerland) Heinz Günthardt | (United States) Eddie Dibbs (France) Guy Forget (United States) Eliot Teltscher (Argentina) José Luis Clerc |
| 16 May | Italian Open; Rome, Italy; Clay – $375,000 – 56S/32D | (Paraguay) Francisco González (Paraguay) Víctor Pecci; 6–2, 6–7, 6–4 | (Sweden) Jan Gunnarsson (United States) Mike Leach | (Sweden) Stefan Simonsson (Switzerland) Heinz Günthardt | (United States) Eddie Dibbs (France) Guy Forget (United States) Eliot Teltscher (Argentina) José Luis Clerc |
| 16 May | Bavarian Tennis Championships; Munich, West Germany; Clay – $75,000 – 32S/16D; Singles – Doubles | (Czechoslovakia) Tomáš Šmíd; 6–0, 6–3, 4–6, 2–6, 7–5 | (Sweden) Joakim Nyström | (Sweden) Hans Simonsson (West Germany) Peter Elter | (Australia) Chris Lewis (Spain) Fernando Luna (Czechoslovakia) Pavel Složil (West Germany) Michael Westphal |
| 16 May | Bavarian Tennis Championships; Munich, West Germany; Clay – $75,000 – 32S/16D; Singles – Doubles | (Australia) Chris Lewis (Czechoslovakia) Pavel Složil; 6–4, 6–2 | (Sweden) Anders Järryd (Czechoslovakia) Tomáš Šmíd | (Sweden) Hans Simonsson (West Germany) Peter Elter | (Australia) Chris Lewis (Spain) Fernando Luna (Czechoslovakia) Pavel Složil (West Germany) Michael Westphal |
| 23 May; 30 May | French Open; Paris, France; Clay; Singles – Doubles – Mixed doubles | (France) Yannick Noah; 6–2, 7–5, 7–6^{(7–3)} | (Sweden) Mats Wilander | (France) Christophe Roger-Vasselin (Spain) José Higueras | (United States) Jimmy Connors (Czechoslovakia) Ivan Lendl (Argentina) Guillermo Vilas (United States) John McEnroe |
| 23 May; 30 May | French Open; Paris, France; Clay; Singles – Doubles – Mixed doubles | (Sweden) Anders Järryd (Sweden) Hans Simonsson; 7–6^{(7–4)}, 6–4, 6–2 | (Australia) Mark Edmondson (United States) Sherwood Stewart | (France) Christophe Roger-Vasselin (Spain) José Higueras | (United States) Jimmy Connors (Czechoslovakia) Ivan Lendl (Argentina) Guillermo Vilas (United States) John McEnroe |
| 23 May; 30 May | French Open; Paris, France; Clay; Singles – Doubles – Mixed doubles | (United States) Barbara Jordan (United States) Eliot Teltscher; 6–2, 6–3 | (United States) Leslie Allen (United States) Charles Strode | (France) Christophe Roger-Vasselin (Spain) José Higueras | (United States) Jimmy Connors (Czechoslovakia) Ivan Lendl (Argentina) Guillermo Vilas (United States) John McEnroe |

=== June ===
| Week | Tournament | Champions | Runners-up | Semifinalists | Quarterfinalists |
|---|---|---|---|---|---|
| 6 Jun | Stella Artois Championships; London, England; Grass – $200,000; Singles – Doubles | (United States) Jimmy Connors; 6–3, 6–3 | (United States) John McEnroe | (Czechoslovakia) Ivan Lendl (South Africa) Kevin Curren | (United States) Steve Denton (United States) Tim Mayotte (Australia) Pat Cash (United States) Brian Gottfried |
| 6 Jun | Stella Artois Championships; London, England; Grass – $200,000; Singles – Doubles | (United States) Brian Gottfried (Australia) Paul McNamee; 6–4, 6–3 | (South Africa) Kevin Curren (United States) Steve Denton | (Czechoslovakia) Ivan Lendl (South Africa) Kevin Curren | (United States) Steve Denton (United States) Tim Mayotte (Australia) Pat Cash (United States) Brian Gottfried |
| 6 Jun | Venice, Italy; Clay – $75,000 – 32S/16D | (Argentina) Roberto Argüello; 2–6, 6–2, 6–0 | (United States) Jimmy Brown | (France) Bernard Fritz (Romania) Florin Segărceanu | (Uruguay) Diego Pérez (Italy) Adriano Panatta (France) Dominique Bedel (Argentina) Carlos Castellan |
| 6 Jun | Venice, Italy; Clay – $75,000 – 32S/16D | (Paraguay) Víctor Pecci (Paraguay) Francisco González; 6–1, 6–2 | (Hungary) Zoltán Kuhárszky (United States) Steve Krulevitz | (France) Bernard Fritz (Romania) Florin Segărceanu | (Uruguay) Diego Pérez (Italy) Adriano Panatta (France) Dominique Bedel (Argentina) Carlos Castellan |
| 13 Jun | Bristol Open; Bristol, England; Grass – $100,000 – 32S/16D; Singles – Doubles | (United States) Johan Kriek; 7–6, 7–5 | (United States) Tom Gullikson | (United States) Lloyd Bourne (India) Ramesh Krishnan | (Chile) Ricardo Acuña (United States) Brian Teacher (Australia) John Fitzgerald (Brazil) Marcos Hocevar |
| 13 Jun | Bristol Open; Bristol, England; Grass – $100,000 – 32S/16D; Singles – Doubles | (Australia) John Alexander (Australia) John Fitzgerald; 7–5, 6–4 | (United States) Tom Gullikson (United States) Johan Kriek | (United States) Lloyd Bourne (India) Ramesh Krishnan | (Chile) Ricardo Acuña (United States) Brian Teacher (Australia) John Fitzgerald (Brazil) Marcos Hocevar |
| 20 Jun; 27 Jun | Wimbledon; London, England; Grass – £978,211; Singles – Doubles – Mixed doubles | (United States) John McEnroe; 6–2, 6–2, 6–2 | (New Zealand) Chris Lewis | (South Africa) Kevin Curren (Czechoslovakia) Ivan Lendl | (United States) Tim Mayotte (United States) Mel Purcell (United States) Roscoe Tanner (United States) Sandy Mayer |
| 20 Jun; 27 Jun | Wimbledon; London, England; Grass – £978,211; Singles – Doubles – Mixed doubles | (United States) Peter Fleming (United States) John McEnroe; 6–4, 6–3, 6–4 | (United States) Tim Gullikson (United States) Tom Gullikson | (South Africa) Kevin Curren (Czechoslovakia) Ivan Lendl | (United States) Tim Mayotte (United States) Mel Purcell (United States) Roscoe Tanner (United States) Sandy Mayer |
| 20 Jun; 27 Jun | Wimbledon; London, England; Grass – £978,211; Singles – Doubles – Mixed doubles | (Australia) Wendy Turnbull (United Kingdom) John Lloyd | (United States) Billie Jean King (United States) Steve Denton | (South Africa) Kevin Curren (Czechoslovakia) Ivan Lendl | (United States) Tim Mayotte (United States) Mel Purcell (United States) Roscoe Tanner (United States) Sandy Mayer |

=== July ===
| Week | Tournament | Champions | Runners-up | Semifinalists | Quarterfinalists |
|---|---|---|---|---|---|
| 4 Jul | Gstaad, Switzerland; Clay – $100,000 – 32S/16D | (United States) Sandy Mayer; 6–0, 6–3, 6–2 | (Czechoslovakia) Tomáš Šmíd | (United States) Mel Purcell (Czechoslovakia) Libor Pimek | (Spain) José Higueras (Poland) Wojciech Fibak (United Kingdom) Colin Dowdeswell (United States) Sammy Giammalva |
| 4 Jul | Gstaad, Switzerland; Clay – $100,000 – 32S/16D | (Czechoslovakia) Tomáš Šmíd (Czechoslovakia) Pavel Složil; 6–7, 6–4, 6–2 | (United Kingdom) Colin Dowdeswell (Poland) Wojciech Fibak | (United States) Mel Purcell (Czechoslovakia) Libor Pimek | (Spain) José Higueras (Poland) Wojciech Fibak (United Kingdom) Colin Dowdeswell (United States) Sammy Giammalva |
| 4 Jul | Newport, Rhode Island, US; Grass – $100,000 – 32S/16D | (Australia) John Fitzgerald; 2–6, 6–1, 6–3 | (United States) Scott Davis | (United States) Tom Gullikson (United States) Matt Mitchell | (United States) Paul Annacone (Australia) Brad Drewett (United States) John Van Nostrand (United States) Tim Gullikson |
| 4 Jul | Newport, Rhode Island, US; Grass – $100,000 – 32S/16D | (Australia) John Fitzgerald (India) Vijay Amritraj; 6–3, 6–4 | (United States) Tim Gullikson (United States) Tom Gullikson | (United States) Tom Gullikson (United States) Matt Mitchell | (United States) Paul Annacone (Australia) Brad Drewett (United States) John Van Nostrand (United States) Tim Gullikson |
| 4 Jul | Davis Cup Quarterfinals; Marseille, France – clay Brisbane, Australia – grass Eastbourne, England – grass Rome, Italy – clay | Quarterfinal Winners; France 3–2; Australia 5–0; Sweden 3–2; Argentina 5–0 | Quarterfinal Losers; Paraguay; Romania; New Zealand; Italy | | |
| 11 Jul | Swedish Open; Båstad, Sweden; Clay – $75,000 – 32S/16D; Singles – Doubles | (Sweden) Mats Wilander; 6–1, 6–2 | (Sweden) Anders Järryd | (United States) Jim Gurfein (United States) Scott Lipton | (Sweden) Stefan Simonsson (Belgium) Bernard Boileau (Sweden) Jan Gunnarsson (Sweden) Henrik Sundström |
| 11 Jul | Swedish Open; Båstad, Sweden; Clay – $75,000 – 32S/16D; Singles – Doubles | (Sweden) Mats Wilander (Sweden) Joakim Nyström; 1–6, 7–6, 7–6 | (Sweden) Anders Järryd (Sweden) Hans Simonsson | (United States) Jim Gurfein (United States) Scott Lipton | (Sweden) Stefan Simonsson (Belgium) Bernard Boileau (Sweden) Jan Gunnarsson (Sweden) Henrik Sundström |
| 11 Jul | U.S. Pro Tennis Championships; Boston, Massachusetts, US; Clay – $200,000 – 56S/28D | (Argentina) José Luis Clerc; 6–3, 6–1 | (United States) Jimmy Arias | (Uruguay) Diego Pérez (United States) Eliot Teltscher | (Ecuador) Andrés Gómez (Italy) Gianni Ocleppo (United States) Jeff Borowiak (United States) Jimmy Brown |
| 11 Jul | U.S. Pro Tennis Championships; Boston, Massachusetts, US; Clay – $200,000 – 56S/28D | (Brazil) Cássio Motta (United States) Mark Dickson; 7–5, 6–3 | (Chile) Hans Gildemeister (Chile) Belus Prajoux | (Uruguay) Diego Pérez (United States) Eliot Teltscher | (Ecuador) Andrés Gómez (Italy) Gianni Ocleppo (United States) Jeff Borowiak (United States) Jimmy Brown |
| 11 Jul | Mercedes Cup; Stuttgart, Germany; Clay – $100,000 – 32S/16D | (Spain) José Higueras; 6–1, 6–1, 7–6 | (Switzerland) Heinz Günthardt | (United States) Brian Teacher (New Zealand) Chris Lewis | (Czechoslovakia) Tomáš Šmíd (West Germany) Andreas Maurer (Australia) John Alexander (South Africa) Bernard Mitton |
| 11 Jul | Mercedes Cup; Stuttgart, Germany; Clay – $100,000 – 32S/16D | (United States) Mike Bauer (India) Anand Amritraj; 4–6, 6–3, 6–2 | (Czechoslovakia) Pavel Složil (Czechoslovakia) Tomáš Šmíd | (United States) Brian Teacher (New Zealand) Chris Lewis | (Czechoslovakia) Tomáš Šmíd (West Germany) Andreas Maurer (Australia) John Alexander (South Africa) Bernard Mitton |
| 18 Jul | Dutch Open; Hilversum, Netherlands; Clay – $75,000 – 32S/16D | (Czechoslovakia) Tomáš Šmíd; 6–4, 6–4 | (Hungary) Balázs Taróczy | (West Germany) Andreas Maurer (Switzerland) Roland Stadler | (Switzerland) Heinz Günthardt (West Germany) Christoph Zipf (West Germany) Rolf Gehring (United States) Eliot Teltscher |
| 18 Jul | Dutch Open; Hilversum, Netherlands; Clay – $75,000 – 32S/16D | (Hungary) Balázs Taróczy (Switzerland) Heinz Günthardt; 3–6, 6–2, 6–3 | (Czechoslovakia) Jan Kodeš (Czechoslovakia) Tomáš Šmíd | (West Germany) Andreas Maurer (Switzerland) Roland Stadler | (Switzerland) Heinz Günthardt (West Germany) Christoph Zipf (West Germany) Rolf Gehring (United States) Eliot Teltscher |
| 18 Jul | Kitzbühel, Austria; Clay – $100,000 – S48/D24 | (Argentina) Guillermo Vilas; 7–6, 4–6, 6–4 | (France) Henri Leconte | (Spain) Sergio Casal (West Germany) Hans Schwaier | (Brazil) Marcos Hocevar (Hungary) Zoltán Kuhárszky (Poland) Wojciech Fibak (Australia) Trevor Allan |
| 18 Jul | Kitzbühel, Austria; Clay – $100,000 – S48/D24 | (Czechoslovakia) Pavel Složil (Poland) Wojciech Fibak; 7–5, 6–2 | (United Kingdom) Colin Dowdeswell (Hungary) Zoltán Kuhárszky | (Spain) Sergio Casal (West Germany) Hans Schwaier | (Brazil) Marcos Hocevar (Hungary) Zoltán Kuhárszky (Poland) Wojciech Fibak (Australia) Trevor Allan |
| 18 Jul | Sovran Bank Classic; Washington, D.C., US; Clay – $200,000 – S56/D28 | (Argentina) José Luis Clerc; 6–3, 3–6, 6–0 | (United States) Jimmy Arias | (Bolivia) Mario Martínez (United States) Eric Korita | (Italy) Francesco Cancellotti (Ecuador) Andrés Gómez (Italy) Claudio Panatta (Peru) Pablo Arraya |
| 18 Jul | Sovran Bank Classic; Washington, D.C., US; Clay – $200,000 – S56/D28 | (Brazil) Cássio Motta (United States) Mark Dickson; 6–2, 1–6, 6–4 | (Australia) Paul McNamee (United States) Ferdi Taygan | (Bolivia) Mario Martínez (United States) Eric Korita | (Italy) Francesco Cancellotti (Ecuador) Andrés Gómez (Italy) Claudio Panatta (Peru) Pablo Arraya |
| 25 Jul | Volvo International; North Conway, New Hampshire, US; Clay – $255,000 – S56/D28; Singles – Doubles | (Argentina) José Luis Clerc; 6–3, 6–1 | (Ecuador) Andrés Gómez | (Spain) José Higueras (United States) Jimmy Arias | (United States) Mel Purcell (United States) Jim Gurfein (Argentina) Guillermo Vilas (United States) Jimmy Brown |
| 25 Jul | Volvo International; North Conway, New Hampshire, US; Clay – $255,000 – S56/D28; Singles – Doubles | (United States) Sherwood Stewart (Australia) Mark Edmondson; 7–6, 7–6 | (United States) Eric Fromm (United States) Drew Gitlin | (Spain) José Higueras (United States) Jimmy Arias | (United States) Mel Purcell (United States) Jim Gurfein (Argentina) Guillermo Vilas (United States) Jimmy Brown |
| 25 Jul | South Orange, New Jersey, US; Clay – $75,000 – 32S/16D | (Australia) Brad Drewett; 4–6, 6–4, 7–6 | (Australia) John Alexander | (United States) Eric Korita (Australia) Paul McNamee | (West Germany) Michael Westphal (United States) Terry Moor (Czechoslovakia) Libor Pimek (United States) Tom Cain |
| 25 Jul | South Orange, New Jersey, US; Clay – $75,000 – 32S/16D | (United States) Tom Cain (United States) Fritz Buehning; 6–2, 7–5 | (United Kingdom) John Lloyd (United States) Dick Stockton | (United States) Eric Korita (Australia) Paul McNamee | (West Germany) Michael Westphal (United States) Terry Moor (Czechoslovakia) Libor Pimek (United States) Tom Cain |

=== August ===
| Week | Tournament | Champions | Runners-up | Semifinalists | Quarterfinalists |
|---|---|---|---|---|---|
| 1 Aug | Buckeye Tennis Classic; Columbus, Ohio, US; Hard – $100,000 – 32S/16D | (United States) Brian Teacher; 7–6, 6–4 | (United States) Bill Scanlon | (France) Henri Leconte (United States) Scott Davis | (United States) Steve Denton (United States) Roscoe Tanner (United States) Brian Gottfried (United States) Eric Korita |
| 1 Aug | Buckeye Tennis Classic; Columbus, Ohio, US; Hard – $100,000 – 32S/16D | (United States) Brian Teacher (United States) Scott Davis; 6–1, 4–6, 7–6^{(16–14)} | (India) Vijay Amritraj (Australia) John Fitzgerald | (France) Henri Leconte (United States) Scott Davis | (United States) Steve Denton (United States) Roscoe Tanner (United States) Brian Gottfried (United States) Eric Korita |
| 1 Aug | U.S. Men's Clay Court Championships; Indianapolis, Indiana, US; Clay – $300,000 – 56S/28D; Singles – Doubles | (United States) Jimmy Arias; 6–4, 2–6, 6–4 | (Ecuador) Andrés Gómez | (United States) Mel Purcell (Israel) Shlomo Glickstein | (United States) Jimmy Brown (Sweden) Henrik Sundström (New Zealand) Chris Lewis (Argentina) Roberto Argüello |
| 1 Aug | U.S. Men's Clay Court Championships; Indianapolis, Indiana, US; Clay – $300,000 – 56S/28D; Singles – Doubles | (United States) Sherwood Stewart (Australia) Mark Edmondson; 6–3, 6–2 | (Brazil) Carlos Kirmayr (Brazil) Cássio Motta | (United States) Mel Purcell (Israel) Shlomo Glickstein | (United States) Jimmy Brown (Sweden) Henrik Sundström (New Zealand) Chris Lewis (Argentina) Roberto Argüello |
| 8 Aug | Cleveland, Ohio, US; Hard – $25,000 – 32S/16D | (United States) Marty Davis; 6–3, 6–2 | (United States) Matt Mitchell | (United States) John Austin (United States) Nick Saviano | (India) Vijay Amritraj (Austria) Peter Feigl (United States) Andy Andrews (United States) John Sadri |
| 8 Aug | Cleveland, Ohio, US; Hard – $25,000 – 32S/16D | (South Africa) Christo van Rensburg (South Africa) Mike Myburg; 7–6, 7–5 | (Paraguay) Francisco González (United States) Matt Mitchell | (United States) John Austin (United States) Nick Saviano | (India) Vijay Amritraj (Austria) Peter Feigl (United States) Andy Andrews (United States) John Sadri |
| 8 Aug | Player's Canadian Open; Montreal, Canada; Hard – $300,000 – 56S/32D; Singles | (Czechoslovakia) Ivan Lendl; 6–2, 6–2 | (Sweden) Anders Järryd | (United States) John McEnroe (United States) Jimmy Connors | (United States) Brian Teacher (United States) Peter Fleming (South Africa) Kevin Curren (United States) Johan Kriek |
| 8 Aug | Player's Canadian Open; Montreal, Canada; Hard – $300,000 – 56S/32D; Singles | (United States) Ferdi Taygan (United States) Sandy Mayer; 6–3, 6–4 | (United States) Tim Gullikson (United States) Tom Gullikson | (United States) John McEnroe (United States) Jimmy Connors | (United States) Brian Teacher (United States) Peter Fleming (South Africa) Kevin Curren (United States) Johan Kriek |
| 15 Aug | ATP Championships; Mason, US; Hard – $375,000 – 64S/32D | (Sweden) Mats Wilander; 6–4, 6–4 | (United States) John McEnroe | (United States) Jimmy Connors (Czechoslovakia) Ivan Lendl | (United States) Jimmy Arias (United States) Sandy Mayer (Paraguay) Francisco González (United States) Kevin Curren |
| 15 Aug | ATP Championships; Mason, US; Hard – $375,000 – 64S/32D | (United States) Tim Gullikson (United States) Victor Amaya; 6–4, 6–3 | (Brazil) Carlos Kirmayr (Brazil) Cássio Motta | (United States) Jimmy Connors (Czechoslovakia) Ivan Lendl | (United States) Jimmy Arias (United States) Sandy Mayer (Paraguay) Francisco González (United States) Kevin Curren |
| 15 Aug | Head Classic; Stowe, Vermont, US; Hard – $75,000 – 32S/16D | (Australia) John Fitzgerald; 3–6, 6–2, 7–5 | (India) Vijay Amritraj | (United States) Matt Doyle (United States) Van Winitsky | (Australia) Brad Drewett (Australia) Paul McNamee (United States) Fritz Buehning (United States) Tom Gullikson |
| 15 Aug | Head Classic; Stowe, Vermont, US; Hard – $75,000 – 32S/16D | (Australia) Kim Warwick (Australia) Brad Drewett; 4–6, 7–5, 6–2 | (United States) Fritz Buehning (United States) Tom Gullikson | (United States) Matt Doyle (United States) Van Winitsky | (Australia) Brad Drewett (Australia) Paul McNamee (United States) Fritz Buehning (United States) Tom Gullikson |
| 29 Aug; 5 Sep | US Open; Flushing Meadow, New York, US; Grand Slam; Hard – 128S/64D/32XD; Singles – Doubles – Mixed doubles | (United States) Jimmy Connors; 6–3, 6–7^{(2–7)}, 7–5, 6–0 | (Czechoslovakia) Ivan Lendl | (United States) Bill Scanlon (United States) Jimmy Arias | (United States) Mark Dickson (United States) Eliot Teltscher (France) Yannick Noah (Sweden) Mats Wilander |
| 29 Aug; 5 Sep | US Open; Flushing Meadow, New York, US; Grand Slam; Hard – 128S/64D/32XD; Singles – Doubles – Mixed doubles | (United States) Peter Fleming (United States) John McEnroe; 6–3, 6–4, 6–2 | (United States) Fritz Buehning (United States) Van Winitsky | (United States) Bill Scanlon (United States) Jimmy Arias | (United States) Mark Dickson (United States) Eliot Teltscher (France) Yannick Noah (Sweden) Mats Wilander |
| 29 Aug; 5 Sep | US Open; Flushing Meadow, New York, US; Grand Slam; Hard – 128S/64D/32XD; Singles – Doubles – Mixed doubles | (Australia) Elizabeth Sayers (Australia) John Fitzgerald; 3–6, 6–3, 6–4 | (United States) Barbara Potter (United States) Ferdi Taygan | (United States) Bill Scanlon (United States) Jimmy Arias | (United States) Mark Dickson (United States) Eliot Teltscher (France) Yannick Noah (Sweden) Mats Wilander |

=== September ===
| Week | Tournament | Champions | Runners-up | Semifinalists | Quarterfinalists |
|---|---|---|---|---|---|
| 12 Sep | Paine Webber Classic; Dallas, Texas, US; Hard – $200,000 – 32S/16D; Singles – Doubles | (Ecuador) Andrés Gómez; 6–7, 6–1, 6–1 | (United States) Brian Teacher | (United States) Sandy Mayer (United States) Scott Davis | (United States) Jimmy Connors (New Zealand) Chris Lewis (Australia) John Fitzgerald (United States) Gene Mayer |
| 12 Sep | Paine Webber Classic; Dallas, Texas, US; Hard – $200,000 – 32S/16D; Singles – Doubles | (United States) Van Winitsky (Nigeria) Nduka Odizor; 6–3, 7–5 | (United States) Steve Denton (United States) Sherwood Stewart | (United States) Sandy Mayer (United States) Scott Davis | (United States) Jimmy Connors (New Zealand) Chris Lewis (Australia) John Fitzgerald (United States) Gene Mayer |
| 12 Sep | Campionati Internazionali di Sicilia; Palermo, Italy; Clay – $100,000 – 32S/16D | (United States) Jimmy Arias; 3–6, 6–1, 6–3 | (Argentina) José Luis Clerc | (United Kingdom) Colin Dowdeswell (Italy) Francesco Cancellotti | (United States) Jimmy Brown (Italy) Corrado Barazzutti (Spain) Juan Avendaño (Peru) Pablo Arraya |
| 12 Sep | Campionati Internazionali di Sicilia; Palermo, Italy; Clay – $100,000 – 32S/16D | (Argentina) José Luis Clerc (Peru) Pablo Arraya; 1–6, 6–4, 6–4 | (South Africa) Danie Visser (South Africa) Tian Viljoen | (United Kingdom) Colin Dowdeswell (Italy) Francesco Cancellotti | (United States) Jimmy Brown (Italy) Corrado Barazzutti (Spain) Juan Avendaño (Peru) Pablo Arraya |
| 19 Sep | Geneva, Switzerland; Clay – $75,000 | (Sweden) Mats Wilander; 3–6, 6–1, 6–3 | (Sweden) Henrik Sundström | (Sweden) Anders Järryd (Argentina) Guillermo Vilas | (Switzerland) Roland Stadler (Italy) Claudio Panatta (Switzerland) Heinz Günthardt (Spain) Roberto Vizcaíno |
| 19 Sep | Geneva, Switzerland; Clay – $75,000 | (Czechoslovakia) Stanislav Birner (United States) Blaine Willenborg; 6–1, 2–6, 6–3 | (Sweden) Joakim Nyström (Sweden) Mats Wilander | (Sweden) Anders Järryd (Argentina) Guillermo Vilas | (Switzerland) Roland Stadler (Italy) Claudio Panatta (Switzerland) Heinz Günthardt (Spain) Roberto Vizcaíno |
| 19 Sep | Bordeaux Open; Bordeaux, France; Clay – $75,000 – 32S/16D; Singles – Doubles | (Peru) Pablo Arraya; 7–5, 7–5 | (Spain) Juan Aguilera | (Czechoslovakia) Miloslav Mečíř (Spain) Fernando Luna | (Argentina) Martín Jaite (Argentina) Roberto Argüello (Sweden) Stefan Simonsson (Uruguay) Diego Pérez |
| 19 Sep | Bordeaux Open; Bordeaux, France; Clay – $75,000 – 32S/16D; Singles – Doubles | (Sweden) Stefan Simonsson (Sweden) Magnus Tideman; 6–4, 6–2 | (Argentina) Francisco Yunis (Argentina) Juan Carlos Yunis | (Czechoslovakia) Miloslav Mečíř (Spain) Fernando Luna | (Argentina) Martín Jaite (Argentina) Roberto Argüello (Sweden) Stefan Simonsson (Uruguay) Diego Pérez |
| 19 Sep | Transamerica Open; San Francisco, US; Carpet – $265,000 – 32S/16D | (Czechoslovakia) Ivan Lendl; 3–6, 7–6^{(7–4)}, 6–4 | (United States) John McEnroe | (South Africa) Kevin Curren (India) Ramesh Krishnan | (United States) Sandy Mayer (United States) Tim Mayotte (United States) Bill Scanlon (United States) Fritz Buehning |
| 19 Sep | Transamerica Open; San Francisco, US; Carpet – $265,000 – 32S/16D | (United States) John McEnroe (United States) Peter Fleming; 6–1, 6–2 | (Czechoslovakia) Ivan Lendl (United States) Vince Van Patten | (South Africa) Kevin Curren (India) Ramesh Krishnan | (United States) Sandy Mayer (United States) Tim Mayotte (United States) Bill Scanlon (United States) Fritz Buehning |
| 25 Sep | Seiko Super Tennis Wailea; Maui, Hawaii, US; Hard – $100,000 – 32S/16D | (United States) Scott Davis; 6–3, 6–7, 7–6 | (United States) Vince Van Patten | (United States) Brad Gilbert (United States) David Dowlen | (Canada) Glenn Michibata (United States) Marty Davis (United States) Tony Giammalva (United States) Chip Hooper |
| 25 Sep | Seiko Super Tennis Wailea; Maui, Hawaii, US; Hard – $100,000 – 32S/16D | (United States) Steve Meister (United States) Tony Giammalva; 6–3, 5–7, 6–4 | (United States) Mike Bauer (United States) Scott Davis | (United States) Brad Gilbert (United States) David Dowlen | (Canada) Glenn Michibata (United States) Marty Davis (United States) Tony Giammalva (United States) Chip Hooper |
| 25 Sep | Davis Cup Semifinals; Sydney, Australia – grass Stockholm, Sweden – carpet (i) | Semifinal Winners; Australia 4–1; Sweden 4–1 | Semifinal Losers; France; Argentina | | |

=== October ===
| Week | Tournament | Champions | Runners-up | Semifinalists | Quarterfinalists |
|---|---|---|---|---|---|
| 3 Oct | Torneo Godó; Barcelona, Spain; Clay – $200,000 – 64S/32D; Singles – Doubles | (Sweden) Mats Wilander; 6–0, 6–3, 6–1 | (Argentina) Guillermo Vilas | (Ecuador) Andrés Gómez (Czechoslovakia) Tomáš Šmíd | (Sweden) Jan Gunnarsson (Sweden) Anders Järryd (Czechoslovakia) Libor Pimek (Spain) Juan Aguilera |
| 3 Oct | Torneo Godó; Barcelona, Spain; Clay – $200,000 – 64S/32D; Singles – Doubles | (Sweden) Hans Simonsson (Sweden) Anders Järryd; 7–5, 6–3 | (United States) Jim Gurfein (United States) Erick Iskersky | (Ecuador) Andrés Gómez (Czechoslovakia) Tomáš Šmíd | (Sweden) Jan Gunnarsson (Sweden) Anders Järryd (Czechoslovakia) Libor Pimek (Spain) Juan Aguilera |
| 3 Oct | GWA Tennis Classic; Brisbane, Australia; Carpet – $100,000 – 32S/16D | (Australia) Pat Cash; 4–6, 6–4, 6–3 | (Australia) Paul McNamee | (United States) Brad Gilbert (Australia) John Fitzgerald | (Australia) Simon Youl (Australia) John Alexander (United States) Mike Leach (United States) Matt Mitchell |
| 3 Oct | GWA Tennis Classic; Brisbane, Australia; Carpet – $100,000 – 32S/16D | (Australia) Paul McNamee (Australia) Pat Cash; 7–6, 7–6 | (Australia) Mark Edmondson (Australia) Kim Warwick | (United States) Brad Gilbert (Australia) John Fitzgerald | (Australia) Simon Youl (Australia) John Alexander (United States) Mike Leach (United States) Matt Mitchell |
| 10 Oct | Swiss Indoors; Basel, Switzerland; Hard – $100,000 – 32S/16D | (United States) Vitas Gerulaitis; 4–6, 6–1, 7–5, 5–5, ret. | (Poland) Wojciech Fibak | (Paraguay) Víctor Pecci (Switzerland) Roland Stadler | (Chile) Ricardo Acuña (United States) Paul Annacone (West Germany) Michael Westphal (Sweden) Johan Carlsson |
| 10 Oct | Swiss Indoors; Basel, Switzerland; Hard – $100,000 – 32S/16D | (Czechoslovakia) Tomáš Šmíd (Czechoslovakia) Pavel Složil; 6–1, 3–6, 7–6 | (Sweden) Stefan Edberg (Romania) Florin Segărceanu | (Paraguay) Víctor Pecci (Switzerland) Roland Stadler | (Chile) Ricardo Acuña (United States) Paul Annacone (West Germany) Michael Westphal (Sweden) Johan Carlsson |
| 10 Oct | Tel Aviv Open; Tel Aviv, Israel; Hard – $75,000 – 32S/16D; Singles – Doubles | (United States) Aaron Krickstein; 7–6, 6–3 | (West Germany) Christoph Zipf | (United Kingdom) Colin Dowdeswell (West Germany) Rolf Gehring | (Israel) Shahar Perkiss (West Germany) Jaromir Becka (France) Gilles Moretton (United States) Richard Meyer |
| 10 Oct | Tel Aviv Open; Tel Aviv, Israel; Hard – $75,000 – 32S/16D; Singles – Doubles | (United Kingdom) Colin Dowdeswell (Hungary) Zoltán Kuhárszky; 6–4, 7–5 | (West Germany) Peter Elter (Austria) Peter Feigl | (United Kingdom) Colin Dowdeswell (West Germany) Rolf Gehring | (Israel) Shahar Perkiss (West Germany) Jaromir Becka (France) Gilles Moretton (United States) Richard Meyer |
| 10 Oct | Australian Indoor; Sydney, Australia; Hard – $255,000; Singles – Doubles | (United States) John McEnroe; 6–1, 6–4, 7–5 | (France) Henri Leconte | (United States) Chip Hooper (Australia) Paul McNamee | (Australia) John Fitzgerald (Australia) John Alexander (United States) Peter Rennert (Czechoslovakia) Ivan Lendl |
| 10 Oct | Australian Indoor; Sydney, Australia; Hard – $255,000; Singles – Doubles | (Australia) Mark Edmondson (United States) Sherwood Stewart; 6–2, 6–4 | (United States) John McEnroe (United States) Peter Rennert | (United States) Chip Hooper (Australia) Paul McNamee | (Australia) John Fitzgerald (Australia) John Alexander (United States) Peter Rennert (Czechoslovakia) Ivan Lendl |
| 17 Oct | Japan Open; Tokyo, Japan; Hard – $125,000; Singles – Doubles | (United States) Eliot Teltscher; 7–6, 3–6, 6–1 | (Ecuador) Andrés Gómez | (United States) Tom Gullikson (United States) Tim Gullikson | (India) Ramesh Krishnan (France) Christophe Roger-Vasselin (Italy) Gianni Ocleppo (United States) Larry Stefanki |
| 17 Oct | Japan Open; Tokyo, Japan; Hard – $125,000; Singles – Doubles | (United States) Sammy Giammalva (United States) Steve Meister; 6–4, 6–7, 7–6 | (United States) Tim Gullikson (United States) Tom Gullikson | (United States) Tom Gullikson (United States) Tim Gullikson | (India) Ramesh Krishnan (France) Christophe Roger-Vasselin (Italy) Gianni Ocleppo (United States) Larry Stefanki |
| 17 Oct | Fischer-Grand Prix; Vienna, Austria; Hard – $100,000 – 32S/16D; Singles – Doubles | (United States) Brian Gottfried; 6–2, 6–3, 7–5 | (United States) Mel Purcell | (Sweden) Stefan Edberg (Sweden) Anders Järryd | (Netherlands) Michiel Schapers (United States) Eric Korita (United States) Mark Dickson (Austria) Peter Feigl |
| 17 Oct | Fischer-Grand Prix; Vienna, Austria; Hard – $100,000 – 32S/16D; Singles – Doubles | (United States) Mel Purcell (United States) Stan Smith; 6–3, 6–4 | (Brazil) Marcos Hocevar (Brazil) Cássio Motta | (Sweden) Stefan Edberg (Sweden) Anders Järryd | (Netherlands) Michiel Schapers (United States) Eric Korita (United States) Mark Dickson (Austria) Peter Feigl |
| 24 Oct | Cologne Cup; Cologne, Germany; Carpet – $75,000 – 32S/16D; Singles – Doubles | (Republic of Ireland) Matt Doyle; 1–6, 6–1, 6–2 | (West Germany) Hans-Dieter Beutel | (Czechoslovakia) Pavel Složil (South Africa) Bernard Mitton | (West Germany) Eric Jelen (United States) Nick Saviano (Socialist Federal Republic of Yugoslavia) Marko Ostoja (United States) Sandy Mayer |
| 24 Oct | Cologne Cup; Cologne, Germany; Carpet – $75,000 – 32S/16D; Singles – Doubles | (United States) Nick Saviano (Romania) Florin Segărceanu; 6–3, 6–4 | (United States) Paul Annacone (United States) Eric Korita | (Czechoslovakia) Pavel Složil (South Africa) Bernard Mitton | (West Germany) Eric Jelen (United States) Nick Saviano (Socialist Federal Republic of Yugoslavia) Marko Ostoja (United States) Sandy Mayer |
| 24 Oct | Tokyo Indoor; Tokyo, Japan; Carpet – $375,000 – 32S/16D; Singles – Doubles | (Czechoslovakia) Ivan Lendl; 3–6, 6–3, 6–4 | (United States) Scott Davis | (United States) Brad Gilbert (United States) Jimmy Connors | (United States) Eliot Teltscher (United States) Tom Gullikson (Ecuador) Andrés Gómez (Canada) Glenn Michibata |
| 24 Oct | Tokyo Indoor; Tokyo, Japan; Carpet – $375,000 – 32S/16D; Singles – Doubles | (Australia) Mark Edmondson (United States) Sherwood Stewart; 6–1, 6–4 | (United States) Steve Denton (Australia) John Fitzgerald | (United States) Brad Gilbert (United States) Jimmy Connors | (United States) Eliot Teltscher (United States) Tom Gullikson (Ecuador) Andrés Gómez (Canada) Glenn Michibata |
| 31 Oct | Seiko Hong Kong Classic; Hong Kong; Hard – $100,000 – 32S/16D | (Australia) Wally Masur; 6–1, 6–1 | (United States) Sammy Giammalva | (Australia) Mark Edmondson (United States) Brad Gilbert | (United States) David Pate (Nigeria) Nduka Odizor (United States) Marty Davis (Australia) Rod Frawley |
| 31 Oct | Seiko Hong Kong Classic; Hong Kong; Hard – $100,000 – 32S/16D | (Australia) Craig Miller (United States) Drew Gitlin; 6–2, 6–2 | (United States) Sammy Giammalva (United States) Steve Meister | (Australia) Mark Edmondson (United States) Brad Gilbert | (United States) David Pate (Nigeria) Nduka Odizor (United States) Marty Davis (Australia) Rod Frawley |
| 31 Oct | Stockholm Open; Stockholm, Sweden; Hard – $315,000; Singles – Doubles | (Sweden) Mats Wilander; 6–1, 7–5 | (Czechoslovakia) Tomáš Šmíd | (United States) Vitas Gerulaitis (United States) Peter Fleming | (Switzerland) Heinz Günthardt (United States) Johan Kriek (United States) Brian Gottfried (France) Henri Leconte |
| 31 Oct | Stockholm Open; Stockholm, Sweden; Hard – $315,000; Singles – Doubles | (Sweden) Anders Järryd (Sweden) Hans Simonsson; 7–6, 7–5 | (United States) Johan Kriek (United States) Peter Fleming | (United States) Vitas Gerulaitis (United States) Peter Fleming | (Switzerland) Heinz Günthardt (United States) Johan Kriek (United States) Brian Gottfried (France) Henri Leconte |

=== November ===
| Week | Tournament | Champions | Runners-up | Semifinalists | Quarterfinalists |
|---|---|---|---|---|---|
| 7 Nov | Taipei International Championships; Taipei, Taiwan; Carpet – $75,000 – 32S/16D | (Nigeria) Nduka Odizor; 6–4, 3–6, 6–4 | (United States) Scott Davis | (United States) Brad Gilbert (United States) Mike Bauer | (United States) Tim Gullikson (India) Ramesh Krishnan (United States) Andy Andrews (Canada) Glenn Michibata |
| 7 Nov | Taipei International Championships; Taipei, Taiwan; Carpet – $75,000 – 32S/16D | (Australia) Kim Warwick (Australia) Wally Masur; 7–6, 6–4 | (United States) Ken Flach (United States) Robert Seguso | (United States) Brad Gilbert (United States) Mike Bauer | (United States) Tim Gullikson (India) Ramesh Krishnan (United States) Andy Andrews (Canada) Glenn Michibata |
| 7 Nov | Benson & Hedges Championships; London, England; Carpet – $315,000 – 32S/16D | (United States) John McEnroe; 7–5, 6–1, 6–4 | (United States) Jimmy Connors | (Sweden) Anders Järryd (Ecuador) Andrés Gómez | (United States) Steve Denton (United States) Gene Mayer (Sweden) Henrik Sundström (United States) Vitas Gerulaitis |
| 7 Nov | Benson & Hedges Championships; London, England; Carpet – $315,000 – 32S/16D | (United States) John McEnroe (United States) Peter Fleming; 6–3, 6–4 | (United States) Steve Denton (United States) Sherwood Stewart | (Sweden) Anders Järryd (Ecuador) Andrés Gómez | (United States) Steve Denton (United States) Gene Mayer (Sweden) Henrik Sundström (United States) Vitas Gerulaitis |
| 14 Nov | Ferrara Open; Ferrara, Italy; Carpet – $75,000 – 32S/16D | (Sweden) Thomas Högstedt; 6–4, 6–4 | (United States) Butch Walts | (Czechoslovakia) Pavel Složil (United States) John Sadri | (South Africa) Bernard Mitton (Switzerland) Jakob Hlasek (United States) Sean Brawley (Czechoslovakia) Libor Pimek |
| 14 Nov | Ferrara Open; Ferrara, Italy; Carpet – $75,000 – 32S/16D | (South Africa) Bernard Mitton (United States) Butch Walts; 7–6, 0–6, 6–3 | (Czechoslovakia) Stanislav Birner (Sweden) Stefan Simonsson | (Czechoslovakia) Pavel Složil (United States) John Sadri | (South Africa) Bernard Mitton (Switzerland) Jakob Hlasek (United States) Sean Brawley (Czechoslovakia) Libor Pimek |
| 21 Nov | Bahia, Brazil; Hard – $75,000 – 32S/16D | (Chile) Pedro Rebolledo; 6–3, 6–3 | (Brazil) Júlio Góes | (Brazil) Ivan Kley (Chile) Álvaro Fillol | (Brazil) Carlos Chabalgoity (Brazil) Fernando Roese (Brazil) Nelson Aerts (Brazil) Givaldo Barbosa |
| 21 Nov | Bahia, Brazil; Hard – $75,000 – 32S/16D | (Brazil) João Soares (Brazil) Givaldo Barbosa | (Argentina) Ricardo Cano (Brazil) Thomaz Koch | (Brazil) Ivan Kley (Chile) Álvaro Fillol | (Brazil) Carlos Chabalgoity (Brazil) Fernando Roese (Brazil) Nelson Aerts (Brazil) Givaldo Barbosa |
| 21 Nov | South African Open; Johannesburg, South Africa; Hard – $375,000 – 32S/16D | (United States) Johan Kriek; 6–4, 4–6, 1–6, 7–5, 6–3 | (United Kingdom) Colin Dowdeswell | (Brazil) Cássio Motta (United States) Vitas Gerulaitis | (Italy) Claudio Panatta (United States) Brian Teacher (Argentina) Guillermo Vilas (United States) Tim Gullikson |
| 21 Nov | South African Open; Johannesburg, South Africa; Hard – $375,000 – 32S/16D | (United States) Brian Teacher (United States) Steve Meister; 6–7, 7–6, 6–2 | (Ecuador) Andrés Gómez (United States) Sherwood Stewart | (Brazil) Cássio Motta (United States) Vitas Gerulaitis | (Italy) Claudio Panatta (United States) Brian Teacher (Argentina) Guillermo Vilas (United States) Tim Gullikson |
| 21 Nov | Grand Prix de Tennis de Toulouse; Toulouse, France; Hard – $100,000 – 32S/16D | (Switzerland) Heinz Günthardt; 6–0, 6–2 | (Peru) Pablo Arraya | (United States) Jimmy Brown (Uruguay) Diego Pérez | (West Germany) Jaromir Becka (France) Pascal Portes (Netherlands) Michiel Schapers (Iran) Mansour Bahrami |
| 21 Nov | Grand Prix de Tennis de Toulouse; Toulouse, France; Hard – $100,000 – 32S/16D | (Czechoslovakia) Pavel Složil (Switzerland) Heinz Günthardt; 5–7, 7–5, 6–4 | (South Africa) Bernard Mitton (United States) Butch Walts | (United States) Jimmy Brown (Uruguay) Diego Pérez | (West Germany) Jaromir Becka (France) Pascal Portes (Netherlands) Michiel Schapers (Iran) Mansour Bahrami |
| 29 Nov | Australian Open; Melbourne, Australia; Grand Slam; Grass; Singles – Doubles | (Sweden) Mats Wilander; 6–3, 6–3, 6–2 | (Czechoslovakia) Ivan Lendl | (United States) Tim Mayotte (United States) John McEnroe | (Czechoslovakia) Tomáš Šmíd (United States) Eliot Teltscher (United States) Johan Kriek (Australia) Wally Masur |
| 29 Nov | Australian Open; Melbourne, Australia; Grand Slam; Grass; Singles – Doubles | (Australia) Mark Edmondson (Australia) Paul McNamee; 6–3, 7–6 | (United States) Steve Denton (United States) Sherwood Stewart | (United States) Tim Mayotte (United States) John McEnroe | (Czechoslovakia) Tomáš Šmíd (United States) Eliot Teltscher (United States) Johan Kriek (Australia) Wally Masur |

=== December ===
| Week | Tournament | Champions | Runners-up | Semifinalists | Quarterfinalists |
|---|---|---|---|---|---|
| 12 Dec | New South Wales Open; Sydney, Australia; Grass – $125,000 – 64S/32D | (Sweden) Joakim Nyström; 2–6, 6–3, 6–1 | (United States) Mike Bauer | (United States) Marty Davis (Australia) Pat Cash | (Australia) Broderick Dyke (Sweden) Anders Järryd (United States) Lloyd Bourne (United States) Robert Seguso |
| 12 Dec | New South Wales Open; Sydney, Australia; Grass – $125,000 – 64S/32D | (Australia) Pat Cash (United States) Mike Bauer; 7–6, 6–4 | (Australia) Broderick Dyke (Australia) Rod Frawley | (United States) Marty Davis (Australia) Pat Cash | (Australia) Broderick Dyke (Sweden) Anders Järryd (United States) Lloyd Bourne (United States) Robert Seguso |
| 19 Dec | South Australian Open; Adelaide, Australia; Grass – $75,000 – 32S/16D | (United States) Mike Bauer; 3–6, 6–4, 6–1 | (Czechoslovakia) Miloslav Mečíř | (Australia) Paul McNamee (Australia) Brad Drewett | (Australia) Chris Lewis (United States) Chip Hooper (United States) Leif Shiras (Australia) Pat Cash |
| 19 Dec | South Australian Open; Adelaide, Australia; Grass – $75,000 – 32S/16D | (Australia) Craig Miller (United States) Eric Sherbeck; 6–3, 4–6, 6–4 | (Australia) Broderick Dyke (Australia) Rod Frawley | (Australia) Paul McNamee (Australia) Brad Drewett | (Australia) Chris Lewis (United States) Chip Hooper (United States) Leif Shiras (Australia) Pat Cash |
26 Dec
| 26 Dec | Davis Final; Melbourne, Australia – grass | Australia; 3–2 | Sweden | | |

=== January 1984 ===
| Week of | Tournament | Champion | Runner-up | Semifinalists | Quarterfinalists |
|---|---|---|---|---|---|
| 10 Jan | Benson and Hedges Open; Auckland, New Zealand; Hard – $75,000 – 32S/16D | (United States) Danny Saltz; 4–6, 6–3, 6–4, 6–4 | (United States) Chip Hooper | (Australia) Brad Drewett (United States) Larry Stefanki | (New Zealand) Chris Lewis (New Zealand) Steve Guy (Australia) John Alexander (New Zealand) Russell Simpson |
| 10 Jan | Benson and Hedges Open; Auckland, New Zealand; Hard – $75,000 – 32S/16D | (South Africa) Brian Levine (United States) John Van Nostrand; 7–5, 6–2 | (Australia) Brad Drewett (United States) Chip Hooper | (Australia) Brad Drewett (United States) Larry Stefanki | (New Zealand) Chris Lewis (New Zealand) Steve Guy (Australia) John Alexander (New Zealand) Russell Simpson |
| 10 Jan | Volvo Masters; New York, US; Carpet – $400,000 – S12/D6 | (United States) John McEnroe; 6–3, 6–4, 6–4 | (Czechoslovakia) Ivan Lendl | (Sweden) Mats Wilander (United States) Jimmy Connors | (Spain) José Higueras (United States) Johan Kriek (Czechoslovakia) Tomáš Šmíd (Ecuador) Andrés Gómez |
| 10 Jan | Volvo Masters; New York, US; Carpet – $400,000 – S12/D6 | (United States) John McEnroe (United States) Peter Fleming; 6–2, 6–2 | (Czechoslovakia) Pavel Složil (Czechoslovakia) Tomáš Šmíd | (Sweden) Mats Wilander (United States) Jimmy Connors | (Spain) José Higueras (United States) Johan Kriek (Czechoslovakia) Tomáš Šmíd (Ecuador) Andrés Gómez |

== ATP rankings ==
As of January 1983
| Rk | Name | Nation |
|---|---|---|
| 1 | John McEnroe | USA |
| 2 | Jimmy Connors | USA |
| 3 | Ivan Lendl | TCH |
| 4 | Guillermo Vilas | ARG |
| 5 | Vitas Gerulaitis | USA |
| 6 | José Luis Clerc | ARG |
| 7 | Mats Wilander | SWE |
| 8 | Gene Mayer | USA |
| 9 | Yannick Noah | FRA |
| 10 | Peter McNamara | AUS |
| 11 | José Higueras | ESP |
| 12 | Johan Kriek | RSA |
| 13 | Steve Denton | USA |
| 14 | Eliot Teltscher | USA |
| 15 | Andrés Gómez | ECU |
| 16 | Sandy Mayer | USA |
| 17 | Kevin Curren | RSA |
| 18 | Brian Teacher | USA |
| 19 | Buster Mottram | GBR |
| 20 | Jimmy Arias | USA |

Year-end rankings 1983 (2 January 1984)
| Rk | Name | Nation | Points | High | Low | Change |
|---|---|---|---|---|---|---|
| 1 | John McEnroe | USA | 129.92 | | | = |
| 2 | Ivan Lendl | TCH | 129.60 | | | ▲ +1 |
| 3 | Jimmy Connors | USA | 106.67 | | | ▼ –1 |
| 4 | Mats Wilander | SWE | 98.47 | | | ▲ +3 |
| 5 | Yannick Noah | FRA | 86.08 | | | ▲ +4 |
| 6 | Jimmy Arias | USA | 70.40 | | | ▲ +14 |
| 7 | José Higueras | ESP | 58.00 | | | ▲ +14 |
| 8 | José Luis Clerc | ARG | 52.58 | | | ▼ –2 |
| 9 | Kevin Curren | RSA | 49.92 | | | ▲ +8 |
| 10 | Gene Mayer | USA | 46.83 | | | ▼ –2 |
| 11 | Guillermo Vilas | ARG | 46.77 | | | ▼ –7 |
| 12 | Bill Scanlon | USA | 46.64 | | | ▲ +59 |
| 13 | Eliot Teltscher | USA | 40.39 | | | ▲ +1 |
| 14 | Andrés Gómez | ECU | 39.95 | | | ▲ +1 |
| 15 | Johan Kriek | USA | 35.06 | | | ▼ –3 |
| 16 | Tim Mayotte | USA | 28.84 | | | ▲ +13 |
| 17 | Tomáš Šmíd | TCH | 28.12 | | | ▲ +6 |
| 18 | Sandy Mayer | USA | 27.95 | | | ▼ –2 |
| 19 | Anders Järryd | SWE | 27.35 | | | ▲ +41 |
| 20 | Vitas Gerulaitis | USA | 26.26 | | | ▼ –15 |

*The official ATP year-end rankings were listed from 2 January 1984.

== List of tournament winners ==
The list of winners and number of Grand Prix titles won, alphabetically by last name:

- (Australia) John Alexander (1) Auckland
- (Argentina) Roberto Argüello (1) Venice
- (United States) Jimmy Arias (4) Florence, Rome, Indianapolis, Palermo
- (Peru) Pablo Arraya (1) Bordeaux
- (United States) Mike Bauer (1) Adelaide
- (Australia) Pat Cash (1) Brisbane
- (Argentina) José Luis Clerc (4) Guarujá, Boston, Washington, D.C., North Conway
- (United States) Jimmy Connors (4) Memphis, Las Vegas, Queen's Club, US Open
- (United States) Marty Davis (1) Cleveland
- (United States) Scott Davis (1) Maui
- (United States) Matt Doyle (1) Cologne
- (Australia) Brad Drewett (1) South Orange
- (Australia) John Fitzgerald (2) Newport, Stowe
- (United States) Vitas Gerulaitis (1) Basel
- (United States) Sammy Giammalva (1) Monterrey
- (Ecuador) Andrés Gómez (1) Dallas
- (United States) Brian Gottfried (1) Vienna
- (Switzerland) Heinz Günthardt (1) Toulouse
- (Spain) José Higueras (3) La Quinta, Bournemouth, Stuttgart Outdoor
- (Sweden) Thomas Högstedt (1) Ferrara
- (United States) Aaron Krickstein (1) Tel Aviv
- (United States) Johan Kriek (3) Tampa, Bristol, Johannesburg
- (Czechoslovakia) Ivan Lendl (8) Masters, Detroit WCT, Milan, Houston WCT, Hilton Head WCT, Montreal, San Francisco, Tokyo Indoor
- (Australia) Wally Masur (1) Hong Kong
- (United States) Gene Mayer (2) Rotterdam, Los Angeles
- (United States) Sandy Mayer (1) Gstaad
- (United States) John McEnroe (6) Philadelphia, Dallas WCT, Wimbledon, Forest Hills WCT, Sydney Indoor, Wembley
- (Australia) Peter McNamara (1) Brussels
- (France) Yannick Noah (3) Madrid, Hamburg, French Open
- (Sweden) Joakim Nyström (1) Sydney Outdoor
- (Nigeria) Nduka Odizor (1) Taiwan
- (Paraguay) Víctor Pecci (1) Viña del Mar
- (Mexico) Raúl Ramírez (1) Caracas
- (Chile) Pedro Rebolledo (1) Bahia
- (United States) Nick Saviano (1) Nancy
- (Czechoslovakia) Tomáš Šmíd (2) Munich, Hilversum
- (Sweden) Henrik Sundström (1) Nice
- (United States) Brian Teacher (2) Munich WCT, Columbus
- (United States) Eliot Teltscher (1) Tokyo Outdoor
- (Argentina) Guillermo Vilas (3) Richmond WCT, Delray Beach WCT, Kitzbüjel
- (Sweden) Mats Wilander (9) Monte Carlo, Lisbon, Aix-en-Provence, Båstad, Cincinnati, Geneva, Barcelona, Stockholm, Australian Open

The following players won their first title in 1983:

- (Argentina) Roberto Argüello Venice
- (Peru) Pablo Arraya Bordeaux
- (United States) Marty Davis Cleveland
- (United States) Scott Davis Maui
- (United States) Matt Doyle Cologne
- (Sweden) Thomas Högstedt Ferrara
- (United States) Aaron Krickstein Tel Aviv
- (Australia) Wally Masur Hong Kong
- (Sweden) Joakim Nyström Sydney Outdoor
- (Nigeria) Nduka Odizor Taiwan
- (United States) Nick Saviano Nancy
- (Sweden) Henrik Sundström Nice

== See also ==
- 1983 World Championship Tennis circuit
- 1983 Virginia Slims World Championship Series
