= 1983 Donnay Open =

- Date: 21–27 March
- Edition: 11th
- Category: Grand Prix
- Draw: 32S / 16D
- Prize money: $75,000
- Surface: Clay / outdoor
- Location: Nice, France
- Venue: Nice Lawn Tennis Club

Champions

Singles
- (Sweden) Henrik Sundström

Doubles
- (Belgium) Bernard Boileau / (Czechoslovakia) Libor Pimek
- Open de Nice Côte d'Azur

The 1983 Donnay Open was a men's tennis tournament played on outdoor clay courts at the Nice Lawn Tennis Club in Nice, France, and was part of the 1983 Volvo Grand Prix. It was the 11th edition of the tournament and was held from 21 March until 27 March 1983. Unseeded Henrik Sundström won the singles title.

== Finals ==
=== Singles ===
(Sweden) Henrik Sundström defeated (Spain) Manuel Orantes 7–5, 4–6, 6–3

- It was Sundström's first singles title of his career.

=== Doubles ===
(Belgium) Bernard Boileau / (Czechoslovakia) Libor Pimek defeated (France) Bernard Fritz / (France) Jean-Louis Haillet 6–3, 6–4
