= 1983 Roger Gallet Cup =

- Date: 9–15 May
- Edition: 11th
- Category: Grand Prix
- Draw: 32S / 16D
- Prize money: $75,000
- Surface: Clay / outdoor
- Location: Florence, Italy

Champions

Singles
- (United States) Jimmy Arias

Doubles
- (Paraguay) Francisco González / (Paraguay) Víctor Pecci
- ATP Florence

The 1983 Roger Gallet Cup was a men's tennis tournament played on outdoor clay courts in Florence, Italy that was part of the 1983 Volvo Grand Prix circuit. It was the 11th edition of the tournament and was played from 9 May until 15 May 1983. Second-seeded Jimmy Arias won the singles title.

== Finals ==
=== Singles ===
(United States) Jimmy Arias defeated (Italy) Francesco Cancellotti 6–4, 6–3

- It was Arias' 1st singles title of the year and the 2nd of his career.

=== Doubles ===
(Paraguay) Francisco González / (Paraguay) Víctor Pecci defeated (France) Dominique Bedel / (France) Bernard Fritz 4–6, 6–4, 7–6
