= 1983 Donnay Open – Singles =

Singles
- 1983 Donnay Open

Final
- Champion: (Sweden) Henrik Sundström
- Runner-up: (Spain) Manuel Orantes
- Score: 7–5, 4–6, 6–3

Details
- Draw: 32 (4Q)
- Seeds: 8

Events
Singles	Doubles
- Open de Nice Côte d'Azur

Balázs Taróczy was the defending champion, but did not compete this year.

Henrik Sundström won the title by defeating Manuel Orantes 7–5, 4–6, 6–3 in the final.

== Seeds ==
1. (United States) Jimmy Arias (second round)
2. (France) Henri Leconte (second round)
3. (United States) Mel Purcell (first round)
4. (Peru) Pablo Arraya (second round)
5. (France) Dominique Bedel (first round)
6. (Australia) Pat Cash (first round)
7. (Spain) Manuel Orantes (final)
8. (Belgium) Bernard Boileau (first round)

== Draw ==
Key

- Q = Qualifier
- WC = Wild card
- LL = Lucky loser
- Alt = Alternate
- ITF = ITF entry
- PR = Protected ranking
- SR = Special ranking
- SE = Special exempt
- JE = Junior exempt
- JR = Junior Accelerator Programme entrant
- CO = College Accelerator Programme entrant
- NG = Next Gen Accelerator Program entrant
- w/o = Walkover
- r = Retired
- d = Defaulted

=== Finals ===
Semifinals
(Bolivia) Mario Martínez	5	2
(Sweden) Henrik Sundström	7	6
(Spain) Fernando Luna	2	2
7	(Spain) Manuel Orantes	6	6

Final
(Sweden) Henrik Sundström	7	4	6
7	(Spain) Manuel Orantes	5	6	3

=== Top half ===
First round
1	(United States) J Arias	6	1	7
(United States) H Solomon	4	6	5
(France) G Forget	2	2
Q	(France) C Casa	6	6
Q	(Sweden) J Windahl	6	1	4
(France) G Moretton	2	6	6
(Bolivia) M Martínez	6	6
5	(France) D Bedel	0	3
3	(United States) M Purcell	2	6	2
(Sweden) H Sundström	6	1	6
(Brazil) C Motta	2	2
(Romania) I Năstase	6	6
(Spain) J Avendaño	6	2	6
(France) B Fritz	4	6	1
Q	(West Germany) U Pinner	6	6
8	(Belgium) B Boileau	3	2

Second round
1	(United States) J Arias	7	5	4
Q	(France) C Casa	5	7	6
(France) G Moretton	6	1
(Bolivia) M Martínez	7	6
(Sweden) H Sundström	6	6
(Romania) I Năstase	3	4
(Spain) J Avendaño	7	6
Q	(West Germany) U Pinner	6	2

Quarterfinals
Q	(France) C Casa	2	1
(Bolivia) M Martínez	6	6
(Sweden) H Sundström	4	7	6
(Spain) J Avendaño	6	6	3

Semifinals
(Bolivia) M Martínez	5	2
(Sweden) H Sundström	7	6

=== Bottom half ===
First round
6	(Australia) P Cash	4	0
(Spain) F Luna	6	6
(Sweden) M Tideman	6	6
(Australia) W Masur	3	2
(United States) J Brown	6	6	6
(France) JL Haillet	3	7	3
(Italy) C Panatta	0	5
4	(Peru) P Arraya	6	7
7	(Spain) M Orantes	6	6
(India) R Krishnan	3	3
Q	(Spain) J Aguilera	6	6
(United States) B Manson	2	3
(France) T Tulasne	7	1	7
(Spain) A Tous	6	6	5
(Colombia) J Velasco Sr.	4	6
2	(France) H Leconte	6	7

Second round
(Spain) F Luna	7	4	6
(Sweden) M Tideman	6	6	1
(United States) J Brown	7	6
4	(Peru) P Arraya	6	2
7	(Spain) M Orantes	7	6
Q	(Spain) J Aguilera	6	3
(France) T Tulasne	6	7
2	(France) H Leconte	3	6

Quarterfinals
(Spain) F Luna	7	6
(United States) J Brown	5	2
7	(Spain) M Orantes	6	6
(France) T Tulasne	2	1

Semifinals
(Spain) F Luna	2	2
7	(Spain) M Orantes	6	6
