= 1983 Dutch Open (tennis) =

- Date: 18–24 July
- Edition: 26th
- Category: Grand Prix
- Draw: 32S / 16D
- Prize money: $75,000
- Surface: Clay / outdoor
- Location: Hilversum, Netherlands
- Venue: 't Melkhuisje

Champions

Singles
- (Czechoslovakia) Tomáš Šmíd

Doubles
- (Switzerland) Heinz Günthardt / (Hungary) Balázs Taróczy
- Dutch Open

The 1983 Dutch Open was a Grand Prix tennis tournament staged in Hilversum, Netherlands. The tournament was played on outdoor clay courts and was held from 18 July until 24 July 1983. It was the 26th edition of the tournament. Tomáš Šmíd won the singles title.

== Finals ==
=== Singles ===
(Czechoslovakia) Tomáš Šmíd defeated (Hungary) Balázs Taróczy 6–4, 6–4

- It was Šmíd's 2nd singles title of the year and the 8th of his career.

=== Doubles ===
(Switzerland) Heinz Günthardt / (Hungary) Balázs Taróczy defeated (Czechoslovakia) Jan Kodeš / (Czechoslovakia) Tomáš Šmíd 3–6, 6–2, 6–3
