= 1983 Stockholm Open – Singles =

Singles
- 1983 Stockholm Open

Final
- Champion: (Sweden) Mats Wilander
- Runner-up: (Czechoslovakia) Tomáš Šmíd
- Score: 6–1, 7–5

Details
- Draw: 48
- Seeds: 16

Events
Singles	Doubles
- Stockholm Open

Henri Leconte was the defending champion, but lost in the quarterfinals this year.

Mats Wilander won the title, defeating Tomáš Šmíd 6–1, 7–5 in the final.

== Seeds ==
1. (Sweden) Mats Wilander (champion)
2. (United States) Gene Mayer (second round)
3. (Ecuador) Andrés Gómez (third round)
4. (South Africa) Johan Kriek (quarterfinals)
5. (United States) Vitas Gerulaitis (semifinals)
6. (United States) Brian Gottfried (quarterfinals)
7. (France) Henri Leconte (quarterfinals)
8. (United States) Hank Pfister (third round)
9. (United States) Steve Denton (second round)
10. (Czechoslovakia) Tomáš Šmíd (final)
11. (Sweden) Henrik Sundström (third round)
12. (Poland) Wojtek Fibak (third round)
13. (United States) Mel Purcell (second round)
14. (Sweden) Anders Järryd (third round)
15. (Israel) Shlomo Glickstein (third round)
16. (Switzerland) Heinz Günthardt (quarterfinals)

== Draw ==
Key

- Q = Qualifier
- WC = Wild card
- LL = Lucky loser
- Alt = Alternate
- ITF = ITF entry
- PR = Protected ranking
- SR = Special ranking
- SE = Special exempt
- JE = Junior exempt
- JR = Junior Accelerator Programme entrant
- CO = College Accelerator Programme entrant
- NG = Next Gen Accelerator Program entrant
- w/o = Walkover
- r = Retired
- d = Defaulted

=== Finals ===
Semifinals
1	(Sweden) Mats Wilander	6	6
5	(United States) Vitas Gerulaitis	3	3
(United States) Peter Fleming	6	4	6
10	(Czechoslovakia) Tomáš Šmíd	4	6	7

Final
1	(Sweden) Mats Wilander	6	7
10	(Czechoslovakia) Tomáš Šmíd	1	5

=== Top half ===
==== Section 1 ====
First round
(West Germany) M Westphal	6	2	3
(Sweden) J Nyström	4	6	6
(United States) T Wilkison	5	4
(Sweden) J Gunnarsson	7	6
LL	(West Germany) C Zipf	4	1
Q	(Sweden) P Lundgren	6	6
Q	(Sweden) V Jansson	1	6	1
(United States) N Saviano	6	4	6

Second round
1	(Sweden) M Wilander	6	7
(Sweden) J Nyström	3	5
(Sweden) J Gunnarsson	3	1
14	(Sweden) A Järryd	6	6
16	(Switzerland) H Günthardt	7	6
Q	(Sweden) P Lundgren	6	3
(United States) N Saviano	7	3	2
8	(United States) H Pfister	5	6	6

Third round
1	(Sweden) M Wilander	6	6
14	(Sweden) A Järryd	2	0
16	(Switzerland) H Günthardt	4	6	7
8	(United States) H Pfister	6	2	5

Quarterfinals
1	(Sweden) M Wilander	4	7	6
16	(Switzerland) H Günthardt	6	5	0

==== Section 2 ====
First round
(Switzerland) R Stadler	3	3
(Uruguay) D Pérez	6	6
(Italy) C Barazzutti	3	1
(Sweden) S Edberg	6	6
Q	(Sweden) A Henricsson	2	6	3
(United States) M Dickson	6	3	6
(Sweden) T Högstedt	2	6	1
(Brazil) M Hocevar	6	3	6

Second round
4	(South Africa) J Kriek	6	6
(Uruguay) D Pérez	3	3
(Sweden) S Edberg	7	4	6
9	(United States) S Denton	5	6	4
11	(Sweden) H Sundström	6	3	7
(United States) M Dickson	4	6	5
(Brazil) M Hocevar	6	4	4
5	(United States) V Gerulaitis	4	6	6

Third round
4	(South Africa) J Kriek	6	7
(Sweden) S Edberg	3	6
11	(Sweden) H Sundström	6	4
5	(United States) V Gerulaitis	7	6

Quarterfinals
4	(South Africa) J Kriek	3	0
5	(United States) V Gerulaitis	6	6

=== Bottom half ===
==== Section 3 ====
First round
(Bolivia) M Martinez	2	2
(Sweden) S Simonsson	6	6
Q	(Sweden) J Carlsson	6	6
(Romania) F Segărceanu	4	0
(Sweden) H Simonsson	4	2
(United States) P Fleming	6	6
(Italy) C Panatta	6	2	6
(Brazil) C Kirmayr	4	6	4

Second round
6	(United States) B Gottfried	6	6	6
(Sweden) S Simonsson	4	7	1
Q	(Sweden) J Carlsson	1	6	3
15	(Israel) S Glickstein	6	3	6
13	(United States) M Purcell	3	6	2
(United States) P Fleming	6	3	6
(Italy) C Panatta	1	4
3	(Ecuador) A Gómez	6	6

Third round
6	(United States) B Gottfried	7	6
15	(Israel) S Glickstein	5	1
(United States) P Fleming	6	6
3	(Ecuador) A Gómez	3	4

Quarterfinals
6	(United States) B Gottfried	6	3	5
(United States) P Fleming	4	6	7

==== Section 4 ====
First round
(France) C Roger-Vasselin	3	6	6
(Sweden) P Carlsson	6	1	4
(United States) E Fromm	6	5	4
Q	(United States) E Iskersky	3	7	6
(Belgium) B Boileau	6	2	4
Q	(West Germany) J Becka	2	6	6
(Sweden) P Hjertquist	7	2	4
(Italy) G Ocleppo	5	6	6

Second round
7	(France) H Leconte	6	6
(France) C Roger-Vasselin	2	2
Q	(United States) E Iskersky	3	7	3
12	(Poland) W Fibak	6	6	6
10	(Czechoslovakia) T Šmíd	6	6
Q	(West Germany) J Becka	3	0
(Italy) G Ocleppo	7	6
2	(United States) G Mayer	6	4

Third round
7	(France) H Leconte	6	6
12	(Poland) W Fibak	2	3
10	(Czechoslovakia) T Šmíd	6	6
(Italy) G Ocleppo	4	1

Quarterfinals
7	(France) H Leconte	1	4
10	(Czechoslovakia) T Šmíd	6	6
