= 1983 South African Open (tennis) =

- Date: 22–27 November
- Edition: 80th
- Category: Grand Prix
- Draw: 32S / 16D
- Prize money: $300,000
- Surface: Hard / outdoor
- Location: Johannesburg, South Africa
- Venue: Ellis Park Tennis Stadium

Champions

Singles
- (South Africa) Johan Kriek

Doubles
- (United States) Steve Meister / (United States) Brian Teacher
- South African Open

The 1983 South African Open was a men's tennis tournament played on indoor hard courts in Johannesburg, South Africa that was part of the 1983 Volvo Grand Prix. It was the 80th open tennis tournament that was held between 22 and 27 November 1983. Sixth-seeded Johan Kriek won the singles title.

== Finals ==
=== Singles ===
(South Africa) Johan Kriek defeated (United Kingdom) Colin Dowdeswell 6–4, 4–6, 1–6, 7–5, 6–3

=== Doubles ===
(United States) Steve Meister / (United States) Brian Teacher defeated (Ecuador) Andrés Gómez / (United States) Sherwood Stewart 6–7, 7–6, 6–2
