= 1983 Benson & Hedges Championships =

- Date: 7–12 November
- Edition: 8th
- Category: Grand Prix circuit
- Draw: 32S / 16D
- Prize money: $250,000
- Surface: Carpet / indoor
- Location: London, England]
- Venue: Wembley Arena

Champions

Singles
- (United States) John McEnroe

Doubles
- (United States) John McEnroe / (United States) Peter Fleming
- Wembley Championships

The 1983 Benson & Hedges Championships was a men's tennis tournament played on indoor carpet courts at the Wembley Arena in London in England that was part of the 1983 Volvo Grand Prix. The tournament was held from 7 November until 12 November 1983. First-seeded John McEnroe won the singles title.

== Finals ==
=== Singles ===
(United States) John McEnroe defeated (United States) Jimmy Connors 7–5, 6–1, 6–4

- It was McEnroe's 6th singles title of the year and the 45th of his career.

=== Doubles ===
(United States) John McEnroe / (United States) Peter Fleming defeated (United States) Steve Denton / (United States) Sherwood Stewart 6–3, 6–4
