= 1983 Donnay Indoor Championships =

- Date: 7–13 March
- Edition: 3rd
- Category: Grand Prix
- Draw: 32S / 16D
- Prize money: $250,000
- Surface: Carpet / indoor
- Location: Brussels, Belgium

Champions

Singles
- (Australia) Peter McNamara

Doubles
- (Switzerland) Heinz Günthardt / (Hungary) Balázs Taróczy
- Donnay Indoor Championships

The 1983 Donnay Indoor Championships was a men's tennis tournament played on indoor carpet courts in Brussels in Belgium the event was part of the 1983 Volvo Grand Prix. The tournament was held from 7 March through 13 March 1983. Fifth-seeded Peter McNamara defeated Ivan Lendl in the final of the singles event, despite trailing 4–5 and 0–30 on Lendl's serve, to win the title and the accompanying $50,000 first-prize money.

== Finals ==
=== Singles ===
(Australia) Peter McNamara defeated (Czechoslovakia) Ivan Lendl, 6–4, 4–6, 7–6

- It was McNamara's only singles title of the year and the fifth and last of his career.

=== Doubles ===
(Switzerland) Heinz Günthardt / (Hungary) Balázs Taróczy defeated (Sweden) Hans Simonsson / (Sweden) Mats Wilander, 6–2, 6–4
