= 1983 Madrid Grand Prix Trofeo =

- Date: 25 April – 1 May
- Edition: 12th
- Category: Grand Prix (Super Series)
- Draw: 32S / 16D
- Prize money: $200,000
- Surface: Clay / outdoor
- Location: Madrid, Spain
- Venue: Real Sociedad Hípica Española Club de Campo

Champions

Singles
- (France) Yannick Noah

Doubles
- (Czechoslovakia) Pavel Složil / (Switzerland) Heinz Günthardt
- Madrid Tennis Grand Prix

The 1983 Madrid Grand Prix Trofeo was a men's tennis tournament played on outdoor clay courts. It was the 12th edition of the tournament and was part of the Super Series of the 1983 Volvo Grand Prix tennis circuit. It was held at the Real Sociedad Hípica Española Club de Campo in Madrid, Spain from 25 April until 1 May 1983. Second-seeded Yannick Noah won the singles title.

== Finals ==
=== Singles ===
(France) Yannick Noah defeated (Sweden) Henrik Sundström 3–6, 6–0, 6–2, 6–4

- It was Noah's 1st singles title of the year and the 12th of his career.

=== Doubles ===
(Czechoslovakia) Pavel Složil / (Switzerland) Heinz Günthardt defeated (Switzerland) Markus Günthardt / (Hungary) Zoltán Kuhárszky 6–3, 6–3
