= 1983 Cuore Cup =

- Date: 21–27 March
- Edition: 6th
- Category: Grand Prix (Super Series)
- Draw: 32S / 16D
- Prize money: $350,000
- Surface: Carpet / indoor
- Location: Milan, Italy
- Venue: Palazzo dello Sport

Champions

Singles
- (Czechoslovakia) Ivan Lendl

Doubles
- (Czechoslovakia) Tomáš Šmíd / (Czechoslovakia) Pavel Složil
- Milan Indoor

The 1983 Cuore Cup was a men's tennis tournament played on indoor Sport Turf carpet courts at the Palazzo dello Sport in Milan, Italy. The event was part of the Super Series tier of the 1983 Volvo Grand Prix circuit. It was the sixth edition of the tournament and was held from 21 March until 27 March 1983. First-seeded Ivan Lendl won the singles title and earned $70,000 first-prize money. Attendance at the tournament was down compared to the levels of the editions in the late 1970s due to the competition of exhibition matches.

== Finals ==
=== Singles ===
(Czechoslovakia) Ivan Lendl defeated (South Africa) Kevin Curren 5–7, 6–3, 7–6^{(7–4)}

- It was Lendl's 2nd singles title of the year and the 34th of his career.

=== Doubles ===
(Czechoslovakia) Tomáš Šmíd / (Czechoslovakia) Pavel Složil defeated (United States) Fritz Buehning / (United States) Peter Fleming 6–2, 5–7, 6–4
