= 1983 U.S. Pro Indoor =

- Date: January 31 – February 7
- Edition: 16th
- Category: Grand Prix
- Draw: 48S / 24D
- Prize money: $ 300,000
- Surface: Carpet / indoor
- Location: Philadelphia, PA, U.S.
- Venue: Spectrum

Champions

Singles
- (United States) John McEnroe

Doubles
- (South Africa) Kevin Curren / (United States) Steve Denton
← 1982 ·	U.S. Pro Indoor	· 1984 →

The 1983 U.S. Pro Indoor was a men's tennis tournament played on indoor carpet courts that was part of the 1983 Volvo Grand Prix. It was played at the Spectrum in Philadelphia, Pennsylvania in the United States from January 31 through February 7, 1983. First-seeded John McEnroe won his second consecutive singles title at the event.

== Finals ==
=== Singles ===
(United States) John McEnroe defeated (Czechoslovakia) Ivan Lendl 4–6, 7–6^{(9–7)}, 6–4, 6–3

- It was McEnroe's first singles title of the year and the 40th of his career.

=== Doubles ===
(South Africa) Kevin Curren / (United States) Steve Denton defeated (United States) Peter Fleming / (United States) John McEnroe 6–4, 7–6^{(7–2)}

- It was Curren's first title of the year and the 14th of his career. It was Denton's first title of the year and the 15th of his career.

== See also ==
- Lendl–McEnroe rivalry
