= 1983 Mercedes Cup =

- Date: 11–17 July
- Edition: 6th
- Category: Grand Prix
- Draw: 32S / 16D
- Prize money: $100,000
- Surface: Clay / outdoor
- Location: Stuttgart, West Germany
- Venue: Tennis Club Weissenhof

Champions

Singles
- (Spain) José Higueras

Doubles
- (United States) Mike Bauer / (India) Anand Amritraj
- Stuttgart Open

The 1983 Mercedes Cup, was a men's tennis tournament played on outdoor clay courts and held at the Tennis Club Weissenhof in Stuttgart, West Germany that was part of the 1983 Grand Prix circuit. It was the sixth edition of the tournament and was held from 11 July until 17 July 1983. First-seeded José Higueras won the singles title.

== Finals ==
=== Singles ===
(Spain) José Higueras defeated (Switzerland) Heinz Günthardt, 6–1, 6–1, 7–6

- It was Higueras' 3rd singles title of the year and the 14th of his career.

=== Doubles ===
(United States) Mike Bauer / (India) Anand Amritraj defeated (Czechoslovakia) Pavel Složil / (Czechoslovakia) Tomáš Šmíd, 4–6, 6–3, 6–2
