= 1983 Donnay Indoor Championships – Singles =

Singles
- 1983 Donnay Indoor Championships

Final
- Champion: (Australia) Peter McNamara
- Runner-up: (Czechoslovakia) Ivan Lendl
- Score: 6–4, 4–6, 7–6

Details
- Draw: 32
- Seeds: 8

Events
Singles	Doubles
- Donnay Indoor Championships

Vitas Gerulaitis was the defending champion, but lost in the semifinals this year.

Peter McNamara won the title, defeating Ivan Lendl 6–4, 4–6, 7–6 in the final.

== Seeds ==
1. (Czechoslovakia) Ivan Lendl (final)
2. (United States) Jimmy Connors (second round)
3. (United States) Vitas Gerulaitis (semifinals)
4. (Sweden) Mats Wilander (semifinals)
5. (Australia) Peter McNamara (champion)
6. (France) Yannick Noah (quarterfinals)
7. (United States) Steve Denton (quarterfinals)
8. (United States) Johan Kriek (quarterfinals)

== Draw ==
Key

- Q = Qualifier
- WC = Wild card
- LL = Lucky loser
- Alt = Alternate
- ITF = ITF entry
- PR = Protected ranking
- SR = Special ranking
- SE = Special exempt
- JE = Junior exempt
- JR = Junior Accelerator Programme entrant
- CO = College Accelerator Programme entrant
- NG = Next Gen Accelerator Program entrant
- w/o = Walkover
- r = Retired
- d = Defaulted

=== Finals ===
Semifinals
1	(Czechoslovakia) Ivan Lendl	7	7
4	(Sweden) Mats Wilander	6	6
3	(United States) Vitas Gerulaitis	2	6
5	(Australia) Peter McNamara	6	7

Final
1	(Czechoslovakia) Ivan Lendl	4	6	6
5	(Australia) Peter McNamara	6	4	7

=== Top half ===
First round
1	(Czechoslovakia) I Lendl	7	6
(United States) B Teacher	6	1
(Hungary) B Taróczy	6	6
(France) G Forget	1	3
(United States) T Mayotte	6	6
(United States) T Wilkison	2	1
(Belgium) J Grandjean	6	2	1
8	(United States) J Kriek	3	6	6
4	(Sweden) M Wilander	6	6
(Sweden) H Simonsson	0	3
Q	(United States) L Stefanki	6	6	6
Q	(United Kingdom) C Dowdeswell	7	4	4
Q	(West Germany) W Popp	7	2	3
(United States) V Van Patten	5	6	6
(Chile) Heinz Gildemeister	4	4
6	(France) Y Noah	6	6

Second round
1	(Czechoslovakia) I Lendl	6	7
(Hungary) B Taróczy	3	5
(United States) T Mayotte	7	2	4
8	(United States) J Kriek	5	6	6
4	(Sweden) M Wilander	6	6
Q	(United States) L Stefanki	1	1
(United States) V Van Patten	6	4	6
6	(France) Y Noah	2	6	7

Quarterfinals
1	(Czechoslovakia) I Lendl	6	6
8	(United States) J Kriek	3	2
4	(Sweden) M Wilander	6	6
6	(France) Y Noah	3	2

Semifinals
1	(Czechoslovakia) I Lendl	7	7
4	(Sweden) M Wilander	6	6

=== Bottom half ===
First round
7	(United States) S Denton	6	6
(Israel) S Glickstein	1	3
(India) V Amritraj	6	5	6
(United States) H Pfister	4	7	7
(France) D Bedel	6	6	6
(Colombia) J Velasco Sr.	3	7	1
(United States) M De Palmer	4	7	6
3	(United States) V Gerulaitis	6	5	7
5	(Australia) P McNamara	6	7
(United States) P Du Pré	1	6
(Belgium) B Boileau	2	4
(United States) F Buehning	6	6
(South Africa) K Curren	6	7
(United States) J Sadri	3	6
Q	(West Germany) K Eberhard	2	3
2	(United States) J Connors	6	6

Second round
7	(United States) S Denton	6	6
(United States) H Pfister	4	3
(France) D Bedel	6	1	4
3	(United States) V Gerulaitis	3	6	6
5	(Australia) P McNamara	7	6
(United States) F Buehning	5	1
(South Africa) K Curren	6	7
2	(United States) J Connors	2	5

Quarterfinals
7	(United States) S Denton	6	4
3	(United States) V Gerulaitis	7	6
5	(Australia) P McNamara	6	7
(South Africa) K Curren	4	5

Semifinals
3	(United States) V Gerulaitis	2	6
5	(Australia) P McNamara	6	7
