= 1983 Robinson's Tennis Open =

- Date: April 25–May 1
- Edition: 4th
- Category: Grand Prix
- Draw: 32S / 16D
- Prize money: $75,000
- Surface: Carpet / indoor
- Location: Tampa, Florida, U.S.
- Venue: USF Sun Dome
- Attendance: ~ 12,000

Champions

Singles
- (United States) Johan Kriek

Doubles
- (United States) Tony Giammalva / (United States) Steve Meister
- Tampa Open

The 1983 Robinson's Tennis Open, also known as the Tampa Open, was a men's tennis tournament played on indoor carpet courts at the USF Sun Dome in Tampa, Florida in the United States that was part of the 1983 Grand Prix circuit. It was the fourth and last edition of the tournament and took place from April 25 through May 1, 1983. First-seeded Johan Kriek won the singles title and earned $15,000 first-prize money. The tournament was moved indoor to the Sun Dome after a successful exhibition match was held there in January between Björn Borg and Vitas Gerulaitis. However, poor attendance figures led to the discontinuation of the event.

== Finals ==
=== Singles ===
(United States) Johan Kriek defeated (United States) Bob Lutz 6–2, 6–4

- It was Kriek's 1st singles title of the year and the 8th of his career.

=== Doubles ===
(United States) Tony Giammalva / (United States) Steve Meister defeated (United States) Eric Fromm / (United States) Drew Gitlin 3–6, 6–1, 7–5

- It was Giammalva's 1st doubles title of the year and the 2nd of his career. It was Meister's 2nd doubles title of the year and the 4th of his career.
