= 1983 Custom Credit Australian Indoor Championships =

- Date: 10–16 October
- Edition: 11th
- Draw: 32S / 16D
- Prize money: $200,000
- Surface: Hard / indoor
- Location: Sydney, Australia
- Venue: Sydney Entertainment Centre

Champions

Singles
- (United States) John McEnroe

Doubles
- (Australia) Mark Edmondson / (United States) Sherwood Stewart
- Australian Indoor Tennis Championships

The 1983 Custom Credit Australian Indoor Championships was a men's tennis tournament played on indoor hard courts at the Sydney Entertainment Centre in Sydney in Australia and was part of the 1983 Volvo Grand Prix. It was the 11th edition of the tournament and was held from 10 October through 16 October 1983. Defending champion and top-seeded John McEnroe won his fourth successive singles title.

== Finals ==
=== Singles ===
(United States) John McEnroe defeated (France) Henri Leconte 6–1, 6–4, 7–5

- It was McEnroe's 5th singles title of the year and the 44th of his career.

=== Doubles ===
(Australia) Mark Edmondson / (United States) Sherwood Stewart defeated (United States) John McEnroe / (United States) Peter Rennert 6–2, 6–4

- It was Edmondson's 3rd title of the year and the 31st of his career. It was Stewart's 4th title of the year and the 46th of his career.
