= 1983 Donnay Open – Doubles =

Doubles
- 1983 Donnay Open

Final
- Champions: (Belgium) Bernard Boileau (Czechoslovakia) Libor Pimek
- Runners-up: (France) Bernard Fritz (France) Jean-Louis Haillet
- Score: 6–3, 6–4

Details
- Draw: 16
- Seeds: 4

Events
Singles	Doubles
- Open de Nice Côte d'Azur

Henri Leconte and Yannick Noah and were the defending champions, but Noah did not compete this year. Leconte teamed up with Gilles Moretton and lost in the first round to Henrik Sundström and Magnus Tideman.

Bernard Boileau and Libor Pimek won the title by defeating Bernard Fritz and Jean-Louis Haillet 6–3, 6–4 in the final.

This tournament saw an unusual outcome, as all seeded pairs were eliminated in the first round.

== Seeds ==
1. (Chile) Hans Gildemeister / (Chile) Belus Prajoux (first round)
2. (Uruguay) José Luis Damiani / (Brazil) Cássio Motta (first round)
3. (Peru) Pablo Arraya / (Romania) Ilie Năstase (first round)
4. (France) Henri Leconte / (France) Gilles Moretton (first round)

== Draw ==
Key

- Q = Qualifier
- WC = Wild card
- LL = Lucky loser
- Alt = Alternate
- ITF = ITF entry
- PR = Protected ranking
- SR = Special ranking
- SE = Special exempt
- JE = Junior exempt
- JR = Junior Accelerator Programme entrant
- CO = College Accelerator Programme entrant
- NG = Next Gen Accelerator Program entrant
- w/o = Walkover
- r = Retired
- d = Defaulted

=== Draw ===
First round
1	(Chile) H Gildemeister (Chile) B Prajoux	6	2	5
(Australia) P Cash (United States) M Leach	1	6	7
(Romania) F Segărceanu (Sweden) J Windahl	7	3	7
(Bolivia) M Martínez (Chile) P Rebolledo	5	6	5
3	(Peru) P Arraya (Romania) I Năstase	6	6	6
(United States) T Delatte (United States) M Purcell	2	7	8
(France) B Fritz (France) JL Haillet	3	7	6
(Belgium) A Brichant (Australia) C Limberger	6	6	0
(France) D Bedel (Italy) G Ocleppo	6	6
(Uruguay) D Pérez (Colombia) J Velasco Sr.	2	2
(Sweden) H Sundström (Sweden) M Tideman	6	6
4	(France) H Leconte (France) G Moretton	3	4
(Belgium) B Boileau (Czechoslovakia) L Pimek	6	6
(Austria) H Kary (Italy) C Panatta	1	2
(West Germany) A Maurer (West Germany) W Popp	7	6
2	(Uruguay) JL Damiani (Brazil) C Motta	6	2

Quarterfinals
(Australia) P Cash (United States) M Leach	3	7	6
(Romania) F Segărceanu (Sweden) J Windahl	6	5	3
(United States) T Delatte (United States) M Purcell	4	2
(France) B Fritz (France) JL Haillet	6	6
(France) D Bedel (Italy) G Ocleppo
(Sweden) H Sundström (Sweden) M Tideman	w/o
(Belgium) B Boileau (Czechoslovakia) L Pimek	6	7
(West Germany) A Maurer (West Germany) W Popp	2	6

Semifinals
(Australia) P Cash (United States) M Leach	6	3
(France) B Fritz (France) JL Haillet	7	6
(Sweden) H Sundström (Sweden) M Tideman	0	3
(Belgium) B Boileau (Czechoslovakia) L Pimek	6	6

Final
(France) B Fritz (France) JL Haillet	3	4
(Belgium) B Boileau (Czechoslovakia) L Pimek	6	6
