= 1983 Swiss Indoors =

- Date: 10–16 October
- Edition: 15th
- Category: Grand Prix
- Draw: 32S / 16D
- Prize money: $100,000
- Surface: Hard / indoor
- Location: Basel, Switzerland
- Venue: St. Jakobshalle

Champions

Singles
- (United States) Vitas Gerulaitis

Doubles
- (Czechoslovakia) Pavel Složil / (Czechoslovakia) Tomáš Šmíd
- Swiss Indoors

The 1983 Swiss Indoors was a men's tennis tournament played on indoor hard courts at the St. Jakobshalle in Basel, Switzerland that was part of the 1983 Volvo Grand Prix. It was the 15th edition of the tournament and was held from 10 October through 16 October 1983. Third-seeded Vitas Gerulaitis won the singles title.

== Finals ==
=== Singles ===
(United States) Vitas Gerulaitis defeated (Poland) Wojciech Fibak 4–6, 6–1, 7–5, 5–5, ret.

- It was Gerulaitis's 1st singles title of the year and the 25th of his career.

=== Doubles ===
(Czechoslovakia) Pavel Složil / (Czechoslovakia) Tomáš Šmíd defeated (Sweden) Stefan Edberg / (Romania) Florin Segărceanu 6–1, 3–6, 7–6
