= 1983 Sovran Bank Classic =

- Date: July 18–24
- Edition: 15th
- Category: Grand Prix
- Draw: 56S / 28D
- Prize money: $200,000
- Surface: Clay / outdoor
- Location: Washington, D.C., United States
- Venue: Rock Creek Park

Champions

Singles
- (Czechoslovakia) José Luis Clerc

Doubles
- (United States) Mark Dickson / (Brazil) Cássio Motta
- Washington Open

The 1983 Sovran Bank Classic was a men's tennis tournament and was played on outdoor clay courts. The event was part of the 1983 Grand Prix circuit. It was the 15th edition of the tournament and was held at Rock Creek Park in Washington, D.C. from July 18 through July 24, 1983. First-seeded José Luis Clerc won the singles title, his second at the event after 1981.

== Finals ==
=== Singles ===
(Argentina) José Luis Clerc defeated (United States) Jimmy Arias 6–3, 3–6, 6–0

- It was Clerc's 3rd singles title of the year and the 24th of his career.

=== Doubles ===
(United States) Mark Dickson / (Brazil) Cássio Motta defeated (Australia) Paul McNamee / (United States) Ferdi Taygan 6–2, 1–6, 6–4
