= 1983 Stockholm Open =

- Date: 31 October – 6 November
- Edition: 15th
- Category: Grand Prix circuit
- Draw: 48S / 24D
- Prize money: $250,000
- Surface: Hard / indoor
- Location: Stockholm, Sweden
- Venue: Kungliga tennishallen

Champions

Singles
- (Sweden) Mats Wilander

Doubles
- (Sweden) Anders Järryd / (Sweden) Hans Simonsson
- Stockholm Open

The 1983 Stockholm Open was a men's tennis tournament played on indoor hard courts and part of the 1983 Volvo Grand Prix and took place at the Kungliga tennishallen in Stockholm, Sweden. It was the 15th edition of the tournament and was held from 31 October through 6 November 1983. First-seeded Mats Wilander won the singles title.

== Finals ==
=== Singles ===
(Sweden) Mats Wilander defeated (Czechoslovakia) Tomáš Šmíd, 6–1, 7–5

- It was Wilander's 8th singles title of the year and the 12th of his career.

=== Doubles ===
(Sweden) Anders Järryd / (Sweden) Hans Simonsson defeated (United States) Peter Fleming / (United States) Johan Kriek, 6–3, 6–4
