= 1983 Donnay Indoor Championships – Doubles =

Doubles
- 1983 Donnay Indoor Championships

Final
- Champions: (Switzerland) Heinz Günthardt (Hungary) Balázs Taróczy
- Runners-up: (Sweden) Hans Simonsson (Sweden) Mats Wilander
- Score: 6–2, 6–4

Details
- Draw: 16
- Seeds: 4

Events
Singles	Doubles
- Donnay Indoor Championships

Pavel Složil and Sherwood Stewart were the defending champions, but Složil did not participate this year. Stewart partnered Ferdi Taygan, losing in the first round.

Heinz Günthardt and Balázs Taróczy won the title, defeating Hans Simonsson and Mats Wilander 6–2, 6–4 in the final.

== Seeds ==
1. (South Africa) Kevin Curren / (United States) Steve Denton (semifinals)
2. (United States) Sherwood Stewart / (United States) Ferdi Taygan (first round)
3. (Switzerland) Heinz Günthardt / (Hungary) Balázs Taróczy (champions)
4. (Chile) Hans Gildemeister / (Brazil) Cássio Motta (first round)

== Draw ==
Key

- Q = Qualifier
- WC = Wild card
- LL = Lucky loser
- Alt = Alternate
- ITF = ITF entry
- PR = Protected ranking
- SR = Special ranking
- SE = Special exempt
- JE = Junior exempt
- JR = Junior Accelerator Programme entrant
- CO = College Accelerator Programme entrant
- NG = Next Gen Accelerator Program entrant
- w/o = Walkover
- r = Retired
- d = Defaulted

=== Draw ===
First round
1	(South Africa) K Curren (United States) S Denton	4	6	6
(United States) A Andrews (United States) J Sadri	6	2	1
(United States) F Buehning (United States) B Teacher	7	6
(Israel) S Glickstein (West Germany) W Popp	5	2
(Sweden) H Simonsson (Sweden) M Wilander	6	4	6
4	(Chile) H Gildemeister (Brazil) C Motta	4	6	2
(United States) T Delatte (United States) J Kriek	1	6	6
(United States) P Du Pré (United States) H Pfister	6	4	4
(United States) L Stefanki (United States) R Van't Hof	6	6
(United States) T Mayotte (United States) T Wilkison	2	2
3	(Switzerland) H Günthardt (Hungary) B Taróczy	6	6
(Belgium) B Boileau (Belgium) J Vanlangendonck	1	0
(Switzerland) M Günthardt (Hungary) Z Kuharszky	7	6
(United States) V Gerulaitis (Australia) P McNamara	6	4
(United States) M De Palmer (Czechoslovakia) J Granát	6	6
2	(United States) S Stewart (United States) F Taygan	1	4

Quarterfinals
1	(South Africa) K Curren (United States) S Denton	7	6
(United States) F Buehning (United States) B Teacher	5	2
(Sweden) H Simonsson (Sweden) M Wilander	7	6
(United States) T Delatte (United States) J Kriek	6	2
(United States) L Stefanki (United States) R Van't Hof	6	3	4
3	(Switzerland) H Günthardt (Hungary) B Taróczy	3	6	6
(Switzerland) M Günthardt (Hungary) Z Kuharszky	6	6
(United States) M De Palmer (Czechoslovakia) J Granát	2	3

Semifinals
1	(South Africa) K Curren (United States) S Denton	3	6	4
(Sweden) H Simonsson (Sweden) M Wilander	6	2	6
3	(Switzerland) H Günthardt (Hungary) B Taróczy	6	6
(Switzerland) M Günthardt (Hungary) Z Kuharszky	3	4

Final
(Sweden) H Simonsson (Sweden) M Wilander	2	4
3	(Switzerland) H Günthardt (Hungary) B Taróczy	6	6
