= 1983 Custom Credit Australian Indoor Championships – Singles =

Singles
- 1983 Custom Credit Australian Indoor Championships

Final
- Champion: (United States) John McEnroe
- Runner-up: (France) Henri Leconte
- Score: 6–1, 6–4, 7–5

Details
- Draw: 32
- Seeds: 8

Events
Singles	Doubles
← 1982 ·	Australian Indoor Tennis Championships	· 1984 →

John McEnroe was the defending champion and won in the final 6–1, 6–4, 7–5 against Henri Leconte.

== Seeds ==
1. (United States) John McEnroe (champion)
2. (Czechoslovakia) Ivan Lendl (quarterfinals)
3. (South Africa) Kevin Curren (second round)
4. (United States) Steve Denton (first round)
5. (France) Henri Leconte (final)
6. (New Zealand) Chris Lewis (first round)
7. (Australia) Mark Edmondson (second round)
8. (Australia) Pat Cash (first round)

== Draw ==
=== Key ===
- Q = Qualifier
- WC = Wild card
- LL = Lucky loser
- Alt = Alternate
- SE = Special exempt
- PR = Protected ranking
- ITF = ITF entry
- JE = Junior exempt
- w/o = Walkover
- r = Retired
- d = Defaulted
- SR = Special ranking

=== Finals ===
Semifinals
1	(United States) John McEnroe	6	6
(United States) Chip Hooper	4	1
(Australia) Paul McNamee	7	4	0
5	(France) Henri Leconte	6	6	6

Final
1	(United States) John McEnroe	6	6	7
5	(France) Henri Leconte	1	4	5

=== Section 1 ===
First round
1	(United States) J McEnroe	6	6
(Australia) J McCurdy	3	3
(United States) B Gilbert	7	6
(United States) V Van Patten	6	0
Q	(United States) J Canter	2	6	7
(United States) M Leach	6	3	6
(Australia) J Fitzgerald	6	7
8	(Australia) P Cash	2	6
3	(South Africa) K Curren	6	6
Q	(Australia) P Johnston	4	2
(United States) C Wittus	6	3
(Australia) J Alexander	7	6
(United States) M Mitchell	6	6
(Australia) K Warwick	4	4
(United States) C Hooper	7	4	6
6	(New Zealand) C Lewis	6	6	4

Second round
1	(United States) J McEnroe	6	6
(United States) B Gilbert	2	0
Q	(United States) J Canter	6	4
(Australia) J Fitzgerald	7	6
3	(South Africa) K Curren	3	6	6
(Australia) J Alexander	6	4	7
(United States) M Mitchell	4	3
(United States) C Hooper	6	6

Quarterfinals
1	(United States) J McEnroe	6	6
(Australia) J Fitzgerald	2	2
(Australia) J Alexander	4	3
(United States) C Hooper	6	6

Semifinals
1	(United States) J McEnroe	6	6
(United States) C Hooper	4	1

=== Section 2 ===
First round
7	(Australia) M Edmondson	6	4	6
(United States) M De Palmer	4	6	3
(Paraguay) F González	4	4
(United States) P Rennert	6	6
(Australia) S Youl	4	0
(France) C Roger-Vasselin	6	6
(Australia) P McNamee	6	7
4	(United States) S Denton	4	6
5	(France) H Leconte	6	6
(Australia) W Masur	2	2
(Australia) B Drewett	6	6
Q	(New Zealand) D Mustard	2	2
Q	(United States) F Taygan	2	4
(United States) F Buehning	6	6
(Australia) R Frawley	3	3
2	(Czechoslovakia) I Lendl	6	6

Second round
7	(Australia) M Edmondson	6	6	4
(United States) P Rennert	3	7	6
(France) C Roger-Vasselin	7	6	6
(Australia) P McNamee	6	7	7
5	(France) H Leconte	6	6
(Australia) B Drewett	1	3
(United States) F Buehning	3	3
2	(Czechoslovakia) I Lendl	6	6

Quarterfinals
(United States) P Rennert	1	2
(Australia) P McNamee	6	6
5	(France) H Leconte	6	3	7
2	(Czechoslovakia) I Lendl	3	6	5

Semifinals
(Australia) P McNamee	7	4	0
5	(France) H Leconte	6	6	6
