= 1983 U.S. Pro Indoor – Doubles =

Doubles
- 1983 U.S. Pro Indoor

Final
- Champions: (South Africa) Kevin Curren; (United States) Steve Denton
- Runners-up: (United States) Peter Fleming; (United States) John McEnroe
- Score: 6–4, 7–6^{(7–2)}

Details
- Draw: 24
- Seeds: 8

Events
Singles	Doubles
- U.S. Pro Indoor

Peter Fleming and John McEnroe were the defending champions, but finished runner-up this year.

Kevin Curren and Steve Denton won the title, defeating Fleming and McEnroe 6–4, 7–6^{(7–2)} in the final.

== Seeds ==
All seeds receive a bye into the second round.

1. (United States) Peter Fleming / (United States) John McEnroe (final)
2. (South Africa) Kevin Curren / (United States) Steve Denton (champions)
3. (Australia) Peter McNamara / (Australia) Paul McNamee (quarterfinals)
4. (United States) Victor Amaya / (United States) Brian Gottfried (quarterfinals)
5. (Czechoslovakia) Pavel Složil / (Czechoslovakia) Tomáš Šmíd (semifinals)
6. (Sweden) Anders Järryd / (Sweden) Hans Simonsson (semifinals)
7. (United States) Tom Gullikson / (United States) Dick Stockton (quarterfinals)
8. (Poland) Wojtek Fibak / (United States) Van Winitsky (second round)

== Draw ==
Key

- Q = Qualifier
- WC = Wild card
- LL = Lucky loser
- Alt = Alternate
- ITF = ITF entry
- PR = Protected ranking
- SR = Special ranking
- SE = Special exempt
- JE = Junior exempt
- JR = Junior Accelerator Programme entrant
- CO = College Accelerator Programme entrant
- NG = Next Gen Accelerator Program entrant
- w/o = Walkover
- r = Retired
- d = Defaulted

=== Finals ===
Semifinals

Final

1
- (United States) Peter Fleming
- (United States) John McEnroe
4
6
7

5
- (Czechoslovakia) Pavel Složil
- (Czechoslovakia) Tomáš Šmíd
6
3
5

1
- (United States) Peter Fleming
- (United States) John McEnroe
4
6

2
- (South Africa) Kevin Curren
- (United States) S Denton
6
7

6
- (Sweden) Anders Järryd
- (Sweden) Hans Simonsson
3
4

2
- (South Africa) Kevin Curren
- (United States) S Denton
6
6

=== Top half ===
First round

Second round

Quarterfinals

Semifinals

1
- (United States) P Fleming
- (United States) J McEnroe
DEF

- (Australia) P Dent
- (South Africa) B Mitton
7
6
7

- (Australia) P Dent
- (South Africa) B Mitton

- (United States) A Andrews
- (United States) J Sadri
6
7
6

1
- (United States) P Fleming
- (United States) J McEnroe
6
6

- (Australia) D Carter
- (United States) B Maze
6
6

7
- (United States) T Gullikson
- (United States) D Stockton
3
4

- (United States) J Arias
- (United States) B Gilbert
3
1

- (Australia) D Carter
- (United States) B Maze
7
6
1

7
- (United States) T Gullikson
- (United States) D Stockton
6
7
6

1
- (United States) P Fleming
- (United States) J McEnroe
4
6
7

5
- (Czechoslovakia) P Složil
- (Czechoslovakia) T Šmíd
6
3
5

4
- (United States) V Amaya
- (United States) B Gottfried
6
6

- (France) H Leconte
- (France) G Moretton
7
6

- (France) H Leconte
- (France) G Moretton
3
3

- (United States) M Bauer
- (New Zealand) C Lewis
6
2

4
- (United States) V Amaya
- (United States) B Gottfried
4
6
1

- (United States) E Fromm
- (United States) S Meister
7
6

5
- (Czechoslovakia) P Složil
- (Czechoslovakia) T Šmíd
6
4
6

- (United States) F Buehning
- (United States) S Mayer
6
4

- (United States) E Fromm
- (United States) S Meister
4
2

5
- (Czechoslovakia) P Složil
- (Czechoslovakia) T Šmíd
6
6

=== Bottom half ===
First round

Second round

Quarterfinals

Semifinals

6
- (Sweden) A Järryd
- (Sweden) H Simonsson
6
6

- (United States) E Teltscher
- (United States) R Van't Hof
6
6

- (United States) E Teltscher
- (United States) R Van't Hof
4
3

- (United States) M Dickson
- (United States) M Gandolfo
1
2

6
- (Sweden) A Järryd
- (Sweden) H Simonsson
7
3
7

- (India) A Amritraj
- (United States) T Giammalva
6
6

3
- (Australia) P McNamara
- (Australia) P McNamee
5
6
6

- (United States) J Hoffman
- (United Kingdom) R Lewis
4
2

- (India) A Amritraj
- (United States) T Giammalva
1
3

3
- (Australia) P McNamara
- (Australia) P McNamee
6
6

6
- (Sweden) A Järryd
- (Sweden) H Simonsson
3
4

2
- (South Africa) K Curren
- (United States) S Denton
6
6

8
- (Poland) W Fibak
- (United States) V Winitsky
6
6
6

- (United States) C Dunk
- (United States) M Mitchell
7
6
6

- (United States) C Dunk
- (United States) M Mitchell
4
7
7

- (United States) L Bourne
- (United States) T Mayotte
6
7
1

- (United States) C Dunk
- (United States) M Mitchell
2
6

- (United States) A Pattison
- (United States) B Walts
6
6

2
- (South Africa) K Curren
- (United States) S Denton
6
7

- (United States) C Hooper
- (United States) M Purcell
4
1

- (United States) A Pattison
- (United States) B Walts
2
2

2
- (South Africa) K Curren
- (United States) S Denton
6
6
