= 1983 Stockholm Open – Doubles =

Doubles
- 1983 Stockholm Open

Final
- Champions: (Sweden) Anders Järryd (Sweden) Hans Simonsson
- Runners-up: (United States) Peter Fleming (South Africa) Johan Kriek
- Score: 6–3, 6–4

Details
- Draw: 24
- Seeds: 8

Events
Singles	Doubles
- Stockholm Open

Mark Dickson and Jan Gunnarsson were the defending champions, but lost in the semifinals.

Anders Järryd and Hans Simonsson won the title, defeating Peter Fleming and Johan Kriek 6–3, 6–4 in the final.

== Seeds ==
All seeds receive a bye into the second round.

1. (Brazil) Carlos Kirmayr / (Brazil) Cássio Motta (second round)
2. (Sweden) Anders Järryd / (Sweden) Hans Simonsson (champions)
3. (United States) Peter Fleming / (South Africa) Johan Kriek (final)
4. (United States) Brian Gottfried / (Czechoslovakia) Tomáš Šmíd (semifinals)
5. (Switzerland) Heinz Günthardt / (United States) Ferdi Taygan (second round)
6. (United States) Mark Dickson / (Sweden) Jan Gunnarsson (semifinals)
7. (United States) Eric Fromm / (Israel) Shlomo Glickstein (second round)
8. (Sweden) Joakim Nyström / (Sweden) Mats Wilander (second round)

== Draw ==
Key

- Q = Qualifier
- WC = Wild card
- LL = Lucky loser
- Alt = Alternate
- ITF = ITF entry
- PR = Protected ranking
- SR = Special ranking
- SE = Special exempt
- JE = Junior exempt
- JR = Junior Accelerator Programme entrant
- CO = College Accelerator Programme entrant
- NG = Next Gen Accelerator Program entrant
- w/o = Walkover
- r = Retired
- d = Defaulted

=== Finals ===
Semifinals
6	(United States) Mark Dickson (Sweden) Jan Gunnarsson	5	6	6
3	(United States) Peter Fleming (South Africa) Johan Kriek	7	1	7
4	(United States) Brian Gottfried (Czechoslovakia) Tomáš Šmíd	5	1
2	(Sweden) Anders Järryd (Sweden) Hans Simonsson	7	6

Final
3	(United States) Peter Fleming (South Africa) Johan Kriek	3	4
2	(Sweden) Anders Järryd (Sweden) Hans Simonsson	6	6

=== Top half ===
First round
(United States) V Gerulaitis (United States) M Purcell	6	6
(Finland) L Palin (Sweden) S Svensson	4	1
(Italy) G Ocleppo (France) C Roger-Vasselin	4	7	6
(United States) R Crowley (United States) R Evett	6	6	2
(Sweden) S Edberg (Sweden) S Simonsson	7	7
(Finland) J Berner (West Germany) H Theissen	6	6
(Ecuador) A Gómez (Ecuador) R Ycaza	6	7
(Switzerland) M Günthardt (United States) E Iskersky	4	5

Second round
1	(Brazil) C Kirmayr (Brazil) C Motta	2	7	2
(United States) V Gerulaitis (United States) M Purcell	6	5	6
(Italy) G Ocleppo (France) C Roger-Vasselin	3	6
6	(United States) M Dickson (Sweden) J Gunnarsson	6	7
3	(United States) P Fleming (South Africa) J Kriek	6	6	6
(Sweden) S Edberg (Sweden) S Simonsson	7	2	4
(Ecuador) A Gómez (Ecuador) R Ycaza	3	6	6
8	(Sweden) J Nyström (Sweden) M Wilander	6	2	4

Quarterfinals
(United States) V Gerulaitis (United States) M Purcell	3	4
6	(United States) M Dickson (Sweden) J Gunnarsson	6	6
3	(United States) P Fleming (South Africa) J Kriek	7	6	7
(Ecuador) A Gómez (Ecuador) R Ycaza	5	7	6

Semifinals
6	(United States) M Dickson (Sweden) J Gunnarsson	5	6	6
3	(United States) P Fleming (South Africa) J Kriek	7	1	7

=== Bottom half ===
First round
(United States) S Denton (United States) H Pfister	7	7
(Sweden) H Sundström (United States) T Wilkinson	6	6
(United States) D Saltz (Sweden) P Svensson	7	6
(West Germany) S Hermann (Denmark) M Mortensen	5	3
(United States) N Saviano (Romania) F Segărceanu	6	6
(Sweden) R Båthman (Sweden) P Hjertquist	2	2
(Brazil) M Hocevar (Italy) C Panatta	7	6
(United States) R Druz (Puerto Rico) E Fernández	6	4

Second round
5	(Switzerland) H Günthardt (United States) F Taygan	3	4
(United States) S Denton (United States) H Pfister	6	6
(United States) D Saltz (Sweden) P Svensson	3	2
4	(United States) B Gottfried (Czechoslovakia) T Šmíd	6	6
7	(United States) E Fromm (Israel) S Glickstein	6	5
(United States) N Saviano (Romania) F Segărceanu	7	7
(Brazil) M Hocevar (Italy) C Panatta	2	6	2
2	(Sweden) A Järryd (Sweden) H Simonsson	6	3	6

Quarterfinals
(United States) S Denton (United States) H Pfister	6	7	4
4	(United States) B Gottfried (Czechoslovakia) T Šmíd	7	5	6
(United States) N Saviano (Romania) F Segărceanu	1	6
2	(Sweden) A Järryd (Sweden) H Simonsson	6	7

Semifinals
4	(United States) B Gottfried (Czechoslovakia) T Šmíd	5	1
2	(Sweden) A Järryd (Sweden) H Simonsson	7	6
