= 1983 U.S. Pro Indoor – Singles =

Singles
- 1983 U.S. Pro Indoor

Final
- Champion: (United States) John McEnroe
- Runner-up: (Czechoslovakia) Ivan Lendl
- Score: 4–6, 7–6^{(9–7)}, 6–4, 6–3

Details
- Draw: 48
- Seeds: 16

Events
Singles	Doubles
← 1982 ·	U.S. Pro Indoor	· 1984 →

The 1983 U.S. Pro Indoor – Singles was an event of the 1983 U.S. Pro Indoor men's tennis tournament. The draw consisted of 48 players, 16 of them were seeded. First-seeded John McEnroe was the defending champion. He successfully defended his title, defeating second-seeded Ivan Lendl, 4–6, 7–6^{(9–7)}, 6–4, 6–3 in the final, breaking a seven-match losing streak against the Czech.

== Seeds ==
1. (United States) John McEnroe (champion)
2. (Czechoslovakia) Ivan Lendl (final)
3. (Sweden) Mats Wilander (third round)
4. (United States) Gene Mayer (third round)
5. (Australia) Peter McNamara (quarterfinals)
6. (United States) Steve Denton (third round)
7. (United States) Eliot Teltscher (quarterfinals)
8. (United States) Sandy Mayer (second round)
9. (South Africa) Kevin Curren (second round)
10. (United States) Jimmy Arias (second round)
11. (United States) Brian Gottfried (quarterfinals)
12. (Poland) Wojtek Fibak (quarterfinals)
13. (Czechoslovakia) Tomáš Šmíd (third round)
14. (United States) Mel Purcell (second round)
15. (France) Henri Leconte (third round)
16. (United States) Tim Mayotte (semifinals)

== Draw ==
=== Key ===
- Q = Qualifier
- WC = Wild card
- LL = Lucky loser
- Alt = Alternate
- SE = Special exempt
- PR = Protected ranking
- ITF = ITF entry
- JE = Junior exempt
- w/o = Walkover
- r = Retired
- d = Defaulted
- SR = Special ranking

=== Finals ===
Semifinals
1	(United States) John McEnroe	6	6
16	(United States) Tim Mayotte	3	3
(United States) Bill Scanlon	6	6
2	(Czechoslovakia) Ivan Lendl	7	7

Final
1	(United States) John McEnroe	4	7	6	6
2	(Czechoslovakia) Ivan Lendl	6	6	4	3

=== Top half ===
==== Section 1 ====
First round
Q	(South Africa) B Mitton	3	1
(United States) J Sadri	6	6
(United States) M De Palmer	7	6
(Australia) P McNamee	6	1
(United States) A Krickstein	2	3
(United States) F Buehning	6	6
(United States) E Fromm	7	7
(Sweden) A Järryd	6	6

Second round
1	(United States) J McEnroe	7	4	6
(United States) J Sadri	6	6	3
(United States) M De Palmer	4	6	6
14	(United States) M Purcell	6	4	1
9	(South Africa) K Curren	4	2
(United States) F Buehning	6	6
(United States) E Fromm	6	3	4
7	(United States) E Teltscher	2	6	6

Third round
1	(United States) J McEnroe	7	6
(United States) M De Palmer	6	2
(United States) F Buehning	1	6	4
7	(United States) E Teltscher	6	4	6

Quarterfinals
1	(United States) J McEnroe	6	7
7	(United States) E Teltscher	3	6

==== Section 2 ====
First round
(Sweden) H Simonsson	2	3
(United States) B Gilbert	6	6
(United States) H Solomon	4	2
(United States) M Bauer	6	6
(Czechoslovakia) P Složil	5	4
(United States) L Bourne	7	6
(United States) J Borowiak	7	7
(United States) C Hooper	6	6

Second round
4	(United States) G Mayer	2	6	6
(United States) B Gilbert	6	4	4
(United States) M Bauer	3	7	5
16	(United States) T Mayotte	6	6	7
11	(United States) B Gottfried	6	7
(United States) L Bourne	4	5
(United States) J Borowiak	7	3	4
6	(United States) S Denton	6	6	6

Third round
4	(United States) G Mayer	4	6	1
16	(United States) T Mayotte	6	4	6
11	(United States) B Gottfried	7	2	7
6	(United States) S Denton	6	6	6

Quarterfinals
16	(United States) T Mayotte	7	6
11	(United States) B Gottfried	6	1

=== Bottom half ===
==== Section 3 ====
First round
(France) G Forget	6	7	6
(United States) V Winitsky	7	6	4
(Spain) A Tous	6	6
(United States) T Gullikson	3	4
(United States) R Harmon	7	3	3
(United States) B Scanlon	6	6	6
(United States) R Van't Hof	7	3	7
(United States) V Amaya	5	6	6

Second round
5	(Australia) P McNamara	6	6
(France) G Forget	3	3
(Spain) A Tous	4	4
13	(Czechoslovakia) T Šmid	6	6
10	(United States) J Arias	1	6
(United States) B Scanlon	6	7
(United States) R Van't Hof	3	6
3	(Sweden) M Wilander	6	7

Third round
5	(Australia) P McNamara	7	6
13	(Czechoslovakia) T Šmid	6	0
(United States) B Scanlon	6	2	6
3	(Sweden) M Wilander	4	6	2

Quarterfinals
5	(Australia) P McNamara	4	6	6
(United States) B Scanlon	6	4	7

==== Section 4 ====
First round
Q	(United States) B Walts	6	5	6
(Australia) P Dent	3	7	1
(United States) M Dickson	7	4	6
(New Zealand) C Lewis	6	6	3
Q	(Australia) D Carter	6	1	6
Q	(United States) T Giammalva	1	6	3
Q	(United States) S Davis	7	6
Q	(United States) S Meister	5	1

Second round
8	(United States) S Mayer	4	7	4
Q	(United States) B Walts	6	5	6
(United States) M Dickson	1	2
12	(Poland) W Fibak	6	6
15	(France) H Leconte	6	7	6
Q	(Australia) D Carter	7	5	1
Q	(United States) S Davis	4	4
2	(Czechoslovakia) I Lendl	6	6

Third round
Q	(United States) B Walts	2	1
12	(Poland) W Fibak	6	6
15	(France) H Leconte	4	2
2	(Czechoslovakia) I Lendl	6	6

Quarterfinals
12	(Poland) W Fibak	4	1
2	(Czechoslovakia) I Lendl	6	6
