= 1983 Custom Credit Australian Indoor Championships – Doubles =

Doubles
- 1983 Custom Credit Australian Indoor Championships

Final
- Champions: (Australia) Mark Edmondson (United States) Sherwood Stewart
- Runners-up: (United States) John McEnroe (United States) Peter Rennert
- Score: 6–2, 6–4

Details
- Draw: 16
- Seeds: 4

Events
Singles	Doubles
- Australian Indoor Tennis Championships

John McEnroe and Peter Rennert were the defending champions but lost in the final 6–2, 6–4 to Mark Edmondson and Sherwood Stewart

== Seeds ==
1. (South Africa) Kevin Curren / (United States) Steve Denton (first round)
2. (United States) John McEnroe / (United States) Peter Rennert (final)
3. (Australia) Mark Edmondson / (United States) Sherwood Stewart (champions)
4. (United States) Fritz Buehning / (United States) Ferdi Taygan (semifinals)

== Draw ==
Key

- Q = Qualifier
- WC = Wild card
- LL = Lucky loser
- Alt = Alternate
- ITF = ITF entry
- PR = Protected ranking
- SR = Special ranking
- SE = Special exempt
- JE = Junior exempt
- JR = Junior Accelerator Programme entrant
- CO = College Accelerator Programme entrant
- NG = Next Gen Accelerator Program entrant
- w/o = Walkover
- r = Retired
- d = Defaulted

First round
1	(South Africa) K Curren (United States) S Denton	4	6	6
(Australia) P Cash (Australia) P McNamee	6	2	7
(Paraguay) F González (United States) M Mitchell	7	5	6
(Australia) B Dyke (Australia) R Frawley	5	7	3
3	(Australia) M Edmondson (United States) S Stewart	6	6
(Australia) S Ball (Australia) C Miller	3	4
(United States) S Meister (United States) C Wittus	4	6	7
(United States) C Hooper (New Zealand) C Lewis	6	4	6
(Australia) C Fancutt (Czechoslovakia) I Lendl	4	6	6
(United States) J Canter (Australia) C Johnstone	6	3	4
(Australia) J Alexander (Australia) J Fitzgerald	3	6	5
4	(United States) F Buehning (United States) F Taygan	6	4	7
(United States) M De Palmer (France) H Leconte	7	3	6
(Australia) R Case (Australia) B Drewett	6	6	2
(Australia) D Graham (Australia) L Warder	5	2
2	(United States) J McEnroe (United States) P Rennert	7	6

Quarterfinals
(Australia) P Cash (Australia) P McNamee	7	3	4
(Paraguay) F González (United States) M Mitchell	6	6	6
3	(Australia) M Edmondson (United States) S Stewart	7	6
(United States) S Meister (United States) C Wittus	6	3
(Australia) C Fancutt (Czechoslovakia) I Lendl	3	6	2
4	(United States) F Buehning (United States) F Taygan	6	3	6
(United States) M De Palmer (France) H Leconte	5	2
2	(United States) J McEnroe (United States) P Rennert	7	6

Semifinals
(Paraguay) F González (United States) M Mitchell	5	4
3	(Australia) M Edmondson (United States) S Stewart	7	6
4	(United States) F Buehning (United States) F Taygan	4	6	6
2	(United States) J McEnroe (United States) P Rennert	6	4	7

Final
3	(Australia) M Edmondson (United States) S Stewart	6	6
2	(United States) J McEnroe (United States) P Rennert	2	4
