= Bernard Fritz =

French tennis player

- Country (sports): France
- Born: 5 October 1953 (age 72) Marseille, France
- Height: 1.73 m (5 ft 8 in)
- Turned pro: 1976
- Retired: 1985
- Plays: Right-handed

Singles
- Career record: 53–82
- Career titles: 0
- Highest ranking: No. 91 (17 January 1983)

Grand Slam singles results
- French Open: 3R (1982)
- Wimbledon: 2R (1980, 1982)
- US Open: 2R (1981)

Doubles
- Career record: 40–54
- Career titles: 0
- Highest ranking: No. 106 (2 January 1984)

Grand Slam doubles results
- French Open: 2R (1980, 1981)
- US Open: 1R (1979)

Bernard Fritz (born 5 October 1953) is a former professional tennis player from France.

Fritz enjoyed most of his tennis success while playing doubles. During his career, he finished runner-up in 4 doubles events. He achieved a career-high doubles ranking of world No. 106 in 1984. He reached a career-high singles ranking of world No. 91 in 1983.

== Career finals ==
=== Doubles (4 runners-up) ===
Result	W/L	Date	Tournament	Surface	Partner	Opponents	Score
Loss	0–1	Oct 1979	Bordeaux, France	Clay	(Colombia) Iván Molina	(France) Patrice Dominguez (France) Denis Naegelen	4–6, 4–6
Loss	0–2	Mar 1980	Cairo, Egypt	Clay	(France) Christophe Freyss	(Egypt) Ismail El Shafei (Netherlands) Tom Okker	3–6, 6–3, 3–6
Loss	0–3	Mar 1983	Nice, France	Clay	(France) Jean-Louis Haillet	(Belgium) Bernard Boileau (Czechoslovakia) Libor Pimek	3–6, 4–6
Loss	0–4	May 1983	Florence, Italy	Clay	(France) Dominique Bedel	(Paraguay) Francisco González (Paraguay) Víctor Pecci	6–4, 4–6, 6–7
