= Bernard Boileau =

Belgian tennis player (1959–2026)

- Country (sports): Belgium
- Residence: Brussels
- Born: 25 May 1959 Liège, Belgium
- Died: 4 October 2026 (aged 67)
- Height: 1.85 m (6 ft 1 in)
- Plays: Right-handed

Singles
- Career record: 33–43
- Career titles: 0
- Highest ranking: No. 42 (31 January 1983)

Grand Slam singles results
- French Open: 2R (1982, 1983, 1984)
- Wimbledon: 1R (1982)

Doubles
- Career record: 13–18
- Career titles: 1
- Highest ranking: No. 155 (3 January 1983)

Grand Slam doubles results
- French Open: 2R (1982, 1983)

Bernard Boileau (25 May 1959 – 4 October 2026) was a Belgian professional tennis player.

== Career ==
Boileau was the Belgian national champion every year from 1978 to 1983. During that time he was a regular fixture in the Belgian Davis Cup team. The Belgian appeared in a total of 14 Davis Cup ties for his country, the first in 1977 and last in 1985. He appeared in 38 rubbers, of which he won 22, 16 of them in singles and six in doubles.

He started touring in 1978 and the following year managed to reach the semi-finals at the Brussels Outdoor tournament.

In 1981, Boileau was a quarter-finalist in Linz.

His best year for Grand Slam tennis was in 1982, when he made the second round of the French Open and Wimbledon Championships, beating Ricardo Ycaza and Vincent Van Patten, respectively. He also reached the quarter-finals in São Paulo.

Boileau partnered with Libor Pimek in the doubles at the Nice International Open in 1983 and the pair finished runners-up, to Bernard Fritz and Jean-Louis Haillet. In the 1983 French Open, Boileau had a five set opening round win over Per Hjertquist, before losing in the second round to Eric Fromm. Also that year, Boileau defeated Tim Mayotte en route to the semi-finals at Guaruja and made the quarter-finals in Bastad.

He was a quarter-finalist at the 1984 Donnay Indoor Championships and a semi-finalist at Hilversum that year. In the former he upset Kevin Curren, a top-10-ranked player. His fourth and final victory in a Grand Slam match came in the 1984 French Open, where he defeated Guy Forget.

== Personal life and death ==
Boileau revealed in 1988 that he had used heroin "almost daily" towards the end of his career.

In 1990 he was sentenced to more than three years' jail for drug use, assault and dangerous driving.

Boileau died on 4 October 2026, at the age of 67.

== Grand Prix career finals ==
=== Doubles: 1 (1–0) ===
Result	W/L	Date	Tournament	Surface	Partner	Opponents	Score
Win	1–0	Mar 1983	Nice, France	Clay	(Czechoslovakia) Libor Pimek	(France) Bernard Fritz (France) Jean-Louis Haillet	6–3, 6–4

== Challenger titles ==
=== Doubles: (1) ===
No.	Year	Tournament	Surface	Partner	Opponents	Score
1.	1981	Brussels, Belgium	Clay	(Belgium) Alain Brichant	(South Africa) Mike Myburg (South Africa) Frank Punčec	7–5, 6–2
