= 1984 Grand Prix (tennis) =

Tennis circuit

1984 Grand Prix circuit
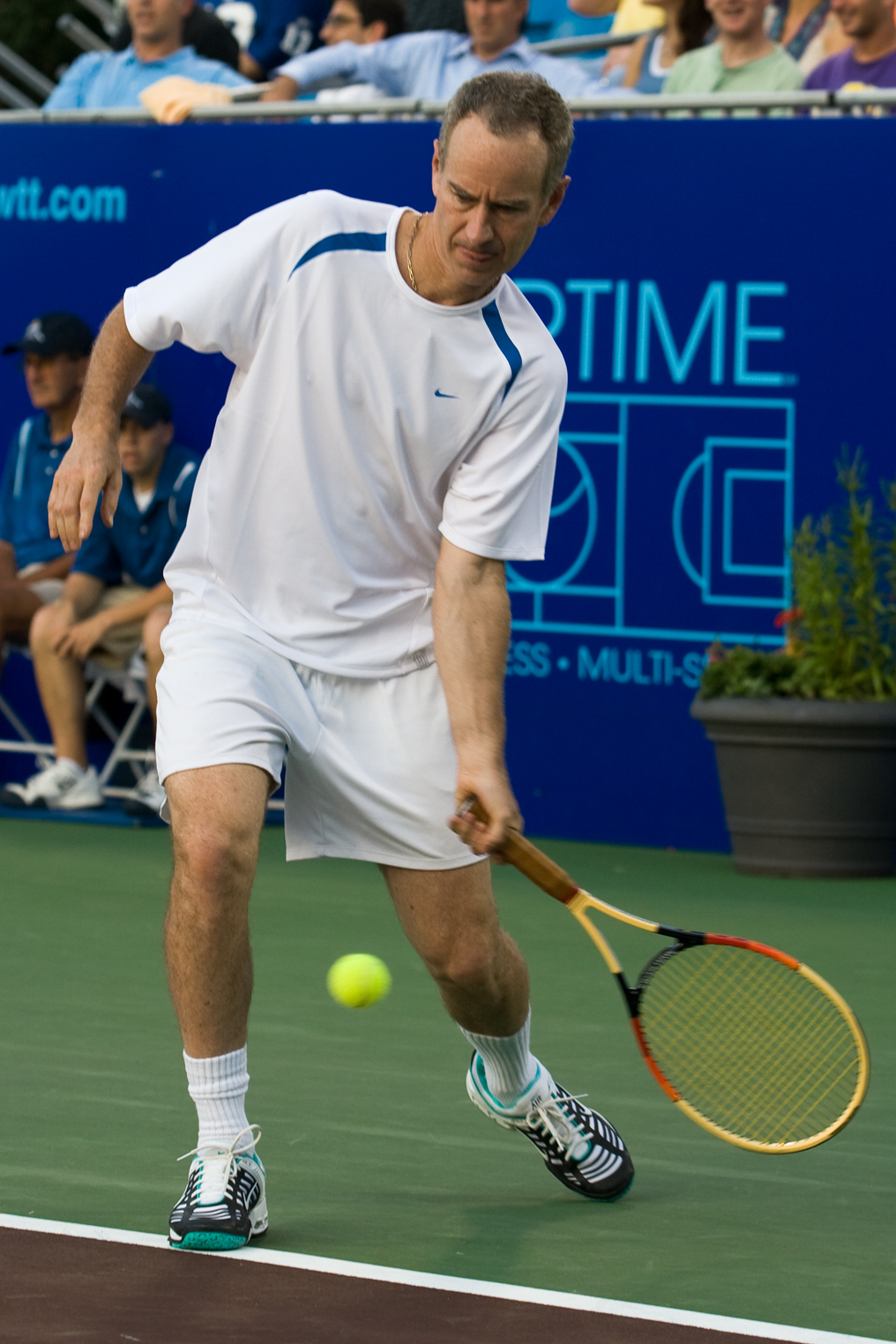
- John McEnroe finished the year as ATP world No. 1 for the fourth time in his career. He won 13 titles during the season, including two majors at the Wimbledon Championships and the US Open, as well as the Masters Grand Prix. He also finished runner-up at another major, the French Open.

Details
- Duration: January 10, 1984 – December 17, 1984
- Edition: 15th
- Tournaments: 68
- Categories: Grand Slam (4); Super Series; Open Week Series; Regular Series; Team Events (2)

Achievements (singles)
- Most titles: (United States) John McEnroe (13)
- Most finals: (United States) John McEnroe (14)
- Prize money leader: (United States) John McEnroe ($2,026,109)
- Points leader: (United States) John McEnroe (3393)

Awards
- Player of the year: (United States) John McEnroe
- Most improved player of the year: Not given
- Newcomer of the year: (United States) Bob Green
- Comeback player of the year: Not given

The 1984 Volvo Grand Prix was a professional tennis circuit held that year. It incorporated the four Grand Slam tournaments, the Grand Prix tournaments and two team events (World Team Cup, Davis Cup).

== Schedule ==
The table below shows the 1984 Volvo Grand Prix schedule (a forerunner of the ATP Tour).

Key

Grand Slam tournaments
Year End Championships
Grand Prix
Team events

=== January ===
Week	Tournament	Champions	Runners-up	Semifinalists	Quarterfinalists
23 Jan; 30 Jan	U.S. Pro Indoor; Philadelphia, US; Carpet – $375,000 – 48S/24D; Singles – Doubles	(United States) John McEnroe; 6–3, 3–6, 6–3, 7–6	(Czechoslovakia) Ivan Lendl	(France) Yannick Noah (Poland) Wojciech Fibak	(United States) Brad Gilbert (United States) Eliot Teltscher (United States) Jimmy Arias (Czechoslovakia) Tomáš Šmíd
23 Jan; 30 Jan	U.S. Pro Indoor; Philadelphia, US; Carpet – $375,000 – 48S/24D; Singles – Doubles	(United States) John McEnroe (United States) Peter Fleming; 6–2, 6–3	(France) Henri Leconte (France) Yannick Noah	(France) Yannick Noah (Poland) Wojciech Fibak	(United States) Brad Gilbert (United States) Eliot Teltscher (United States) Jimmy Arias (Czechoslovakia) Tomáš Šmíd

=== February ===
Week	Tournament	Champions	Runners-up	Semifinalists	Quarterfinalists
6 Feb	Volvo U.S. National Indoor; Memphis, US; Carpet – $315,000 – 48S/24D	(United States) Jimmy Connors; 6–3, 4–6, 7–5	(France) Henri Leconte	(United States) Ben Testerman (United States) Eliot Teltscher	(United States) Fritz Buehning (United States) Tim Mayotte (United States) Jimmy Arias (Poland) Wojciech Fibak
6 Feb	Volvo U.S. National Indoor; Memphis, US; Carpet – $315,000 – 48S/24D	(United States) Fritz Buehning (United States) Peter Fleming; 6–3, 6–0	(Switzerland) Heinz Günthardt (Czechoslovakia) Tomáš Šmíd	(United States) Ben Testerman (United States) Eliot Teltscher	(United States) Fritz Buehning (United States) Tim Mayotte (United States) Jimmy Arias (Poland) Wojciech Fibak
13 Feb	Congoleum Classic; La Quinta, California, US; Hard – $255,000 – 56S/28D; Singles – Doubles	(United States) Jimmy Connors; 6–2, 6–7, 6–3	(France) Yannick Noah	(Spain) José Higueras (United States) Jimmy Arias	(United States) Tim Mayotte (United States) Scott Davis (Israel) Schlomo Glickstein (United States) Eliot Teltscher
13 Feb	Congoleum Classic; La Quinta, California, US; Hard – $255,000 – 56S/28D; Singles – Doubles	(South Africa) Bernard Mitton (United States) Butch Walts; 5–7, 6–3, 6–2	(United States) Scott Davis (United States) Ferdi Taygan	(Spain) José Higueras (United States) Jimmy Arias	(United States) Tim Mayotte (United States) Scott Davis (Israel) Schlomo Glickstein (United States) Eliot Teltscher
20 Feb	Davis Cup First Round; Perth, Australia – grass Telford, England – carpet (i); Stuttgart, West Germany – carpet (i); Bucharest, Romania – carpet (i); Hradec Králové, Czechoslovakia – carpet New Delhi, India – grass Christchurch, New Zealand – grass Norrköping, Sweden – carpet (i)	First Round Winners; Australia 5–0; Italy 3–2; Argentina 4–1; United States 5–0; Czechoslovakia 5–0; France 4–1; Paraguay 3–2; Sweden 4–1	First Round Losers; Yugoslavia; Great Britain; West Germany; Romania; Denmark; India; New Zealand; Ecuador		
27 Feb	Madrid Tennis Grand Prix; Madrid, Spain; Carpet – $200,000 – 56S/28D	(United States) John McEnroe; 6–0, 6–4, 7–6	(Czechoslovakia) Tomáš Šmíd	(South Africa) Kevin Curren (United States) Vitas Gerulaitis	(United States) Bill Scanlon (Sweden) Anders Järryd (Ecuador) Andrés Gómez (United States) Tom Gullikson
27 Feb	Madrid Tennis Grand Prix; Madrid, Spain; Carpet – $200,000 – 56S/28D	(United States) Peter Fleming (United States) John McEnroe; 6–2, 6–3	(United States) Fritz Buehning (United States) Ferdi Taygan	(South Africa) Kevin Curren (United States) Vitas Gerulaitis	(United States) Bill Scanlon (Sweden) Anders Järryd (Ecuador) Andrés Gómez (United States) Tom Gullikson

=== March ===
Week	Tournament	Champions	Runners-up	Semifinalists	Quarterfinalists
5 Mar	Brussels Indoor; Brussels, Belgium; Carpet – $250,000 – 32S/16D; Singles – Doubles	(United States) John McEnroe; 6–1, 6–3	(Czechoslovakia) Ivan Lendl	(Czechoslovakia) Tomáš Šmíd (Sweden) Thomas Högstedt	(United States) Gene Mayer (Sweden) Henrik Sundström (Belgium) Bernard Boileau (United States) Johan Kriek
5 Mar	Brussels Indoor; Brussels, Belgium; Carpet – $250,000 – 32S/16D; Singles – Doubles	(United States) Tim Gullikson (United States) Tom Gullikson; 6–4, 6–7, 7–6	(South Africa) Kevin Curren (United States) Steve Denton	(Czechoslovakia) Tomáš Šmíd (Sweden) Thomas Högstedt	(United States) Gene Mayer (Sweden) Henrik Sundström (Belgium) Bernard Boileau (United States) Johan Kriek
12 Mar	Lorraine Open; Metz, France; Carpet – $75,000 – 32S/16D	(India) Ramesh Krishnan; 6–3, 6–3	(Sweden) Jan Gunnarsson	(United States) Mark Dickson (Czechoslovakia) Miloslav Mečíř	(Australia) Brad Drewett (United States) Mike De Palmer (Romania) Ilie Năstase (Hungary) Balázs Taróczy
12 Mar	Lorraine Open; Metz, France; Carpet – $75,000 – 32S/16D	(South Africa) Eddie Edwards (South Africa) Danie Visser; 3–6, 6–4, 6–2	(Australia) Wayne Hampson (Australia) Wally Masur	(United States) Mark Dickson (Czechoslovakia) Miloslav Mečíř	(Australia) Brad Drewett (United States) Mike De Palmer (Romania) Ilie Năstase (Hungary) Balázs Taróczy
12 Mar	ABN World Tennis Tournament; Rotterdam, Netherlands; Carpet – $250,000 – 32S/16D; Singles – Doubles	No winner	(Czechoslovakia) Ivan Lendl (United States) Jimmy Connors; 6–0, 1–0 match abandoned	(Sweden) Stefan Edberg (Sweden) Anders Järryd	(United States) Mel Purcell (United States) Eliot Teltscher (South Africa) Kevin Curren (United States) Gene Mayer
12 Mar	ABN World Tennis Tournament; Rotterdam, Netherlands; Carpet – $250,000 – 32S/16D; Singles – Doubles	(South Africa) Kevin Curren (Poland) Wojciech Fibak; 6–4, 6–4	(United States) Fritz Buehning (United States) Ferdi Taygan	(Sweden) Stefan Edberg (Sweden) Anders Järryd	(United States) Mel Purcell (United States) Eliot Teltscher (South Africa) Kevin Curren (United States) Gene Mayer
19 Mar	Cuore Tennis Cup; Milan, Italy; Carpet – $365,000 – 32S/16D	(Sweden) Stefan Edberg; 6–4, 6–2	(Sweden) Mats Wilander	(United States) Vitas Gerulaitis (Australia) Brad Drewett	(France) Henri Leconte (Australia) John Fitzgerald (Switzerland) Jakob Hlasek (South Africa) Kevin Curren
19 Mar	Cuore Tennis Cup; Milan, Italy; Carpet – $365,000 – 32S/16D	(Czechoslovakia) Pavel Složil (Czechoslovakia) Tomáš Šmíd; 6–4, 6–3	(South Africa) Kevin Curren (United States) Steve Denton	(United States) Vitas Gerulaitis (Australia) Brad Drewett	(France) Henri Leconte (Australia) John Fitzgerald (Switzerland) Jakob Hlasek (South Africa) Kevin Curren
26 Mar	Boca West, Florida, US; Hard - $265,000	(United States) Jimmy Connors; 7–5, 6–4	(United States) Johan Kriek	(United States) Jimmy Arias (France) Yannick Noah	(United States) Sammy Giammalva (United States) Mel Purcell (United States) Tony Giammalva (United States) Scott Davis
26 Mar	Boca West, Florida, US; Hard - $265,000	(Australia) Mark Edmondson (United States) Sherwood Stewart; 4–6, 6–1, 6–4	(United States) David Dowlen (Nigeria) Nduka Odizor	(United States) Jimmy Arias (France) Yannick Noah	(United States) Sammy Giammalva (United States) Mel Purcell (United States) Tony Giammalva (United States) Scott Davis

=== April ===
Week	Tournament	Champions	Runners-up	Semifinalists	Quarterfinalists
2 Apr	Bari, Italy; Clay - $75,000	(Sweden) Henrik Sundström; 7–6, 6–4	(Chile) Pedro Rebolledo	(Spain) Emilio Sánchez (United States) Marcel Freeman	(West Germany) Andreas Maurer (Spain) Juan Avendaño (Spain) Gabriel Urpí (Czechoslovakia) Libor Pimek
2 Apr	Bari, Italy; Clay - $75,000	(Czechoslovakia) Stanislav Birner (Czechoslovakia) Libor Pimek; 2–6, 7–6, 6–4	(United States) Marcel Freeman (United States) Tim Wilkison	(Spain) Emilio Sánchez (United States) Marcel Freeman	(West Germany) Andreas Maurer (Spain) Juan Avendaño (Spain) Gabriel Urpí (Czechoslovakia) Libor Pimek
9 Apr	Kockelscheuer, Luxembourg; Carpet - $200,000	(Czechoslovakia) Ivan Lendl; 6–4, 6–4	(Czechoslovakia) Tomáš Šmíd	(United States) Gene Mayer (United States) Mike Bauer	(Brazil) João Soares (Sweden) Anders Järryd (West Germany) Eric Jelen (United States) Steve Denton
9 Apr	Kockelscheuer, Luxembourg; Carpet - $200,000	(Sweden) Anders Järryd (Czechoslovakia) Tomáš Šmíd; 6–3, 7–5	(Australia) Mark Edmondson (United States) Sherwood Stewart	(United States) Gene Mayer (United States) Mike Bauer	(Brazil) João Soares (Sweden) Anders Järryd (West Germany) Eric Jelen (United States) Steve Denton
9 Apr	Nice International Open; Nice, France; Clay $75,000	(Ecuador) Andrés Gómez; 6–1, 6–4	(Sweden) Henrik Sundström	(Sweden) Joakim Nyström (Argentina) Roberto Argüello	(France) Dominique Bedel (Spain) Emilio Sánchez (Spain) Juan Aguilera (United States) Van Winitsky
9 Apr	Nice International Open; Nice, France; Clay $75,000	(Sweden) Jan Gunnarsson (Denmark) Michael Mortensen; 6–1, 7–5	(Chile) Hans Gildemeister (Ecuador) Andrés Gómez	(Sweden) Joakim Nyström (Argentina) Roberto Argüello	(France) Dominique Bedel (Spain) Emilio Sánchez (Spain) Juan Aguilera (United States) Van Winitsky
16 Apr	Monte Carlo Open; Roquebrune-Cap-Martin, France; Clay - $405,000	(Sweden) Henrik Sundström; 6–3, 7–5, 6–2	(Sweden) Mats Wilander	(United States) Jimmy Arias (France) Yannick Noah	(Czechoslovakia) Ivan Lendl (United States) Scott Davis (Ecuador) Andrés Gómez (Argentina) Guillermo Vilas
16 Apr	Monte Carlo Open; Roquebrune-Cap-Martin, France; Clay - $405,000	(Australia) Mark Edmondson (United States) Sherwood Stewart; 6–2, 6–1	(Sweden) Jan Gunnarsson (Sweden) Mats Wilander	(United States) Jimmy Arias (France) Yannick Noah	(Czechoslovakia) Ivan Lendl (United States) Scott Davis (Ecuador) Andrés Gómez (Argentina) Guillermo Vilas
23 Apr	Aix-en-Provence, France; Clay $75,000	(Spain) Juan Aguilera; 6–4, 7–5	(Spain) Fernando Luna	(Australia) Paul McNamee (France) Trevor Allan	(Argentina) José Luis Clerc (Australia) Pat Cash (Sweden) Joakim Nyström (Uruguay) Diego Pérez
23 Apr	Aix-en-Provence, France; Clay $75,000	(Australia) Pat Cash (Australia) Paul McNamee; 4–6, 6–3, 6–4	(New Zealand) Chris Lewis (Australia) Wally Masur	(Australia) Paul McNamee (France) Trevor Allan	(Argentina) José Luis Clerc (Australia) Pat Cash (Sweden) Joakim Nyström (Uruguay) Diego Pérez

=== May ===
Week	Tournament	Champions	Runners-up	Semifinalists	Quarterfinalists
7 May	Ebel German Open; Hamburg, Germany; Clay - $315,000; Singles – Doubles	(Spain) Juan Aguilera; 6–4, 2–6, 2–6, 6–4, 6–4	(Sweden) Henrik Sundström	(Sweden) Mats Wilander (Argentina) Guillermo Vilas	(Czechoslovakia) Libor Pimek (Ecuador) Andrés Gómez (United States) Gene Mayer (France) Yannick Noah
7 May	Ebel German Open; Hamburg, Germany; Clay - $315,000; Singles – Doubles	(Sweden) Stefan Edberg (Sweden) Anders Järryd; 6–3, 6–1	(Switzerland) Heinz Günthardt (Hungary) Balázs Taróczy	(Sweden) Mats Wilander (Argentina) Guillermo Vilas	(Czechoslovakia) Libor Pimek (Ecuador) Andrés Gómez (United States) Gene Mayer (France) Yannick Noah
7 May	Roger et Gallet Cup; Florence, Italy; Clay – $75,000 – 32S/16D	(Italy) Francesco Cancellotti; 6–1, 6–4	(United States) Jimmy Brown	(Italy) Gianni Ocleppo (France) Tarik Benhabiles	(Spain) David de Miguel-Lapiedra (United States) Mark Dickson (Switzerland) Claudio Mezzadri (Sweden) Stefan Simonsson
7 May	Roger et Gallet Cup; Florence, Italy; Clay – $75,000 – 32S/16D	(United States) Mark Dickson (United States) Chip Hooper; 7–6, 4–6, 7–5	(South Africa) Bernard Mitton (United States) Butch Walts	(Italy) Gianni Ocleppo (France) Tarik Benhabiles	(Spain) David de Miguel-Lapiedra (United States) Mark Dickson (Switzerland) Claudio Mezzadri (Sweden) Stefan Simonsson
14 May	Bavarian Tennis Championships; Munich, Germany; Clay – $75,000 – 32S/16D; Singles – Doubles	(Czechoslovakia) Libor Pimek; 6–4, 4–6, 7–6, 6–4	(United States) Gene Mayer	(Australia) John Frawley (West Germany) Michael Westphal	(West Germany) Jaromir Becka (Switzerland) Zoltan Kuharszky (United States) Chip Hooper (South Africa) Bernard Mitton
14 May	Bavarian Tennis Championships; Munich, Germany; Clay – $75,000 – 32S/16D; Singles – Doubles	(West Germany) Boris Becker (Poland) Wojciech Fibak; 6–4, 4–6, 6–1	(United States) Eric Fromm (Romania) Florin Segărceanu	(Australia) John Frawley (West Germany) Michael Westphal	(West Germany) Jaromir Becka (Switzerland) Zoltan Kuharszky (United States) Chip Hooper (South Africa) Bernard Mitton
14 May	Italian Open; Rome, Italy; Clay - $315,000	(Ecuador) Andrés Gómez; 2–6, 6–1, 6–2, 6–2	(United States) Aaron Krickstein	(Uruguay) Diego Pérez (Argentina) José Luis Clerc	(Italy) Francesco Cancellotti (United States) Mark Dickson (Peru) Pablo Arraya (Italy) Claudio Panatta
14 May	Italian Open; Rome, Italy; Clay - $315,000	(United States) Ken Flach (United States) Robert Seguso; 3–6, 6–3, 6–4	(Australia) John Alexander (United States) Mike Leach	(Uruguay) Diego Pérez (Argentina) José Luis Clerc	(Italy) Francesco Cancellotti (United States) Mark Dickson (Peru) Pablo Arraya (Italy) Claudio Panatta
21 May	World Team Cup; Düsseldorf, Germany; Clay - $500,000	United States; 2–1	Czechoslovakia		
28 May; 4 June	French Open; Paris, France; Grand Slam; Clay - $1,100,000; Singles – Doubles – Mixed doubles	(Czechoslovakia) Ivan Lendl; 3–6, 2–6, 6–4, 7–5, 7–5	(United States) John McEnroe	(United States) Jimmy Connors (Sweden) Mats Wilander	(United States) Jimmy Arias (Sweden) Henrik Sundström (France) Yannick Noah (Ecuador) Andrés Gómez
28 May; 4 June	French Open; Paris, France; Grand Slam; Clay - $1,100,000; Singles – Doubles – Mixed doubles	(France) Henri Leconte (France) Yannick Noah; 6–4, 2–6, 3–6, 6–3, 6–2	(Czechoslovakia) Pavel Složil (Czechoslovakia) Tomáš Šmíd	(United States) Jimmy Connors (Sweden) Mats Wilander	(United States) Jimmy Arias (Sweden) Henrik Sundström (France) Yannick Noah (Ecuador) Andrés Gómez

=== June ===
Week	Tournament	Champions	Runners-up	Semifinalists	Quarterfinalists
11 Jun	Queen's Club Championships; London, England; Grass – $200,000 – 64S/32D; Singles – Doubles	(United States) John McEnroe; 6–1, 3–6, 6–2	(United States) Leif Shiras	(United States) Jimmy Connors (United States) Rodney Harmon	(South Africa) Danie Visser (United States) Tim Mayotte (New Zealand) Russell Simpson (France) Guy Forget
11 Jun	Queen's Club Championships; London, England; Grass – $200,000 – 64S/32D; Singles – Doubles	(Australia) Pat Cash (Australia) Paul McNamee; 6–4, 6–3	(South Africa) Bernard Mitton (United States) Butch Walts	(United States) Jimmy Connors (United States) Rodney Harmon	(South Africa) Danie Visser (United States) Tim Mayotte (New Zealand) Russell Simpson (France) Guy Forget
18 Jun	Bristol Open; Bristol, England; Grass – $100,000 – 48S/24D; Singles – Doubles	(United States) Johan Kriek; 6–7, 7–6, 6–4	(United States) Brian Teacher	(Nigeria) Nduka Odizor (United States) Lloyd Bourne	(United States) Tim Gullikson (United States) Jeff Turpin (Australia) John Alexander (United States) Marty Davis
18 Jun	Bristol Open; Bristol, England; Grass – $100,000 – 48S/24D; Singles – Doubles	(United States) Larry Stefanki (United States) Robert Van't Hof; 6–4, 5–7, 9–7	(Australia) John Alexander (Australia) John Fitzgerald	(Nigeria) Nduka Odizor (United States) Lloyd Bourne	(United States) Tim Gullikson (United States) Jeff Turpin (Australia) John Alexander (United States) Marty Davis
25 Jun; 2 Jul	Wimbledon; London, England; Grand Slam; Grass - $886,985; Singles – Doubles – Mixed doubles	(United States) John McEnroe; 6–1, 6–1, 6–2	(United States) Jimmy Connors	(Australia) Pat Cash (Czechoslovakia) Ivan Lendl	(United States) John Sadri (Ecuador) Andrés Gómez (United States) Paul Annacone (Czechoslovakia) Tomáš Šmíd
25 Jun; 2 Jul	Wimbledon; London, England; Grand Slam; Grass - $886,985; Singles – Doubles – Mixed doubles	(United States) Peter Fleming (United States) John McEnroe; 6–2, 5–7, 6–2, 3–6, 6–3	(Australia) Pat Cash (Australia) Paul McNamee	(Australia) Pat Cash (Czechoslovakia) Ivan Lendl	(United States) John Sadri (Ecuador) Andrés Gómez (United States) Paul Annacone (Czechoslovakia) Tomáš Šmíd
25 Jun; 2 Jul	Wimbledon; London, England; Grand Slam; Grass - $886,985; Singles – Doubles – Mixed doubles	(United Kingdom) John Lloyd (Australia) Wendy Turnbull; 6–3, 6–3	(United States) Steve Denton (United States) Kathy Jordan	(Australia) Pat Cash (Czechoslovakia) Ivan Lendl	(United States) John Sadri (Ecuador) Andrés Gómez (United States) Paul Annacone (Czechoslovakia) Tomáš Šmíd

=== July ===
Week	Tournament	Champions	Runners-up	Semifinalists	Quarterfinalists
9 Jul	Swiss Open; Gstaad, Switzerland; Clay – $125,000 – 32S/16D	(Sweden) Joakim Nyström; 6–4, 6–2	(United States) Brian Teacher	(France) Trevor Allan (Spain) José Higueras	(Switzerland) Heinz Günthardt (United States) Steve Meister (Poland) Wojciech Fibak (United States) Lloyd Bourne
9 Jul	Swiss Open; Gstaad, Switzerland; Clay – $125,000 – 32S/16D	(Switzerland) Heinz Günthardt (Switzerland) Markus Günthardt; 6–4, 3–6, 7–6	(Brazil) Givaldo Barbosa (Brazil) João Soares	(France) Trevor Allan (Spain) José Higueras	(Switzerland) Heinz Günthardt (United States) Steve Meister (Poland) Wojciech Fibak (United States) Lloyd Bourne
9 Jul	Newport, Rhode Island, US; Grass – $100,000 – 32S/16D	(India) Vijay Amritraj; 3–6, 6–4, 6–4	(United States) Tim Mayotte	(United States) John Sadri (United States) Leif Shiras	(Australia) Brad Drewett (United States) Paul Annacone (United States) Tom Gullikson (United States) Matt Mitchell
9 Jul	Newport, Rhode Island, US; Grass – $100,000 – 32S/16D	(Australia) David Graham (Australia) Laurie Warder; 6–4, 7–6	(United States) Ken Flach (United States) Robert Seguso	(United States) John Sadri (United States) Leif Shiras	(Australia) Brad Drewett (United States) Paul Annacone (United States) Tom Gullikson (United States) Matt Mitchell
9 Jul	Davis Cup Quarterfinals; Brisbane, Australia – grass Atlanta, GA, United States – carpet (i); Hradec Králové, Czechoslovakia – carpet Båstad, Sweden – clay	Quarterfinal Winners; Australia 5–0; United States 5–0; Czechoslovakia 3–2; Sweden 4–1	Quarterfinal Losers; Italy; Argentina; France; Paraguay		
16 Jul	Mercedes Cup; Stuttgart, Germany; Clay – $100,000 – 32S/16D; Singles – Doubles	(France) Henri Leconte; 7–6^{(11–9)}, 6–0, 1–6, 6–1	(United States) Gene Mayer	(United States) Eliot Teltscher (Czechoslovakia) Tomáš Šmíd	(United States) Brian Teacher (Switzerland) Zoltan Kuharszky (New Zealand) Chris Lewis (Spain) José Higueras
16 Jul	Mercedes Cup; Stuttgart, Germany; Clay – $100,000 – 32S/16D; Singles – Doubles	(United States) Gene Mayer (West Germany) Andreas Maurer 7–6, 6–4	(United States) Fritz Buehning (United States) Ferdi Taygan	(United States) Eliot Teltscher (Czechoslovakia) Tomáš Šmíd	(United States) Brian Teacher (Switzerland) Zoltan Kuharszky (New Zealand) Chris Lewis (Spain) José Higueras
16 Jul	Swedish Open; Båstad, Sweden; Clay – $75,000 – 32S/16D; Singles – Doubles	(Sweden) Henrik Sundström; 3–6, 7–5, 6–3	(Sweden) Anders Järryd	(Sweden) Stefan Edberg (Sweden) Joakim Nyström	(Sweden) Jan Gunnarsson (West Germany) Hans-Dieter Beutel (Netherlands) Michiel Schapers (Czechoslovakia) Jaroslav Navrátil
16 Jul	Swedish Open; Båstad, Sweden; Clay – $75,000 – 32S/16D; Singles – Doubles	(Sweden) Jan Gunnarsson (Denmark) Michael Mortensen; 6–0, 6–0	(Spain) Juan Avendaño (Brazil) Fernando Roese	(Sweden) Stefan Edberg (Sweden) Joakim Nyström	(Sweden) Jan Gunnarsson (West Germany) Hans-Dieter Beutel (Netherlands) Michiel Schapers (Czechoslovakia) Jaroslav Navrátil
16 Jul	U.S. Pro Tennis Championships; Boston, Massachusetts, US; Clay – $200,000 – 64S/32D; Singles – Doubles	(United States) Aaron Krickstein; 7–6, 3–6, 6–4	(Argentina) José Luis Clerc	(Czechoslovakia) Pavel Složil (Ecuador) Andrés Gómez	(United States) Jimmy Arias (Australia) John Alexander (United States) Mike Leach (Argentina) Guillermo Vilas
16 Jul	U.S. Pro Tennis Championships; Boston, Massachusetts, US; Clay – $200,000 – 64S/32D; Singles – Doubles	(United States) Ken Flach (United States) Robert Seguso; 6–4, 6–4	(United States) Gary Donnelly (United States) Ernie Fernandez	(Czechoslovakia) Pavel Složil (Ecuador) Andrés Gómez	(United States) Jimmy Arias (Australia) John Alexander (United States) Mike Leach (Argentina) Guillermo Vilas
23 Jul	Sovran Bank Classic; Washington, D.C., US; Clay – $200,000 – 56S/28D; Singles – Doubles	(Ecuador) Andrés Gómez; 6–2, 6–2	(United States) Aaron Krickstein	(France) Thierry Tulasne (Argentina) Guillermo Vilas	(United States) Dan Goldie (Uruguay) Diego Pérez (Peru) Pablo Arraya (United States) Mel Purcell
23 Jul	Sovran Bank Classic; Washington, D.C., US; Clay – $200,000 – 56S/28D; Singles – Doubles	(Czechoslovakia) Pavel Složil (United States) Ferdi Taygan; 7–6, 6–1	(United States) Drew Gitlin (United States) Blaine Willenborg	(France) Thierry Tulasne (Argentina) Guillermo Vilas	(United States) Dan Goldie (Uruguay) Diego Pérez (Peru) Pablo Arraya (United States) Mel Purcell
23 Jul	Dutch Open; Hilversum, Netherlands; Clay – $75,000 – 32S/16D; Singles – Doubles	(Sweden) Anders Järryd; 6–2, 6–2, 2–6, 6–2	(Czechoslovakia) Tomáš Šmíd	(Argentina) Carlos Castellan (Belgium) Bernard Boileau	(West Germany) Damir Keretić (Czechoslovakia) Stanislav Birner (United Kingdom) Jonathan Smith (Sweden) Kent Carlsson
23 Jul	Dutch Open; Hilversum, Netherlands; Clay – $75,000 – 32S/16D; Singles – Doubles	(Sweden) Anders Järryd (Czechoslovakia) Tomáš Šmíd; 6–4, 5–7, 7–6	(Australia) Broderick Dyke (Australia) Michael Fancutt	(Argentina) Carlos Castellan (Belgium) Bernard Boileau	(West Germany) Damir Keretić (Czechoslovakia) Stanislav Birner (United Kingdom) Jonathan Smith (Sweden) Kent Carlsson
23 Jul	Kitzbühel, Austria; Clay – $100,000 – 48S/24D	(Spain) José Higueras; 7–5, 3–6, 6–1	(Paraguay) Víctor Pecci	(France) Henri Leconte (United States) Brian Teacher	(Socialist Federal Republic of Yugoslavia) Slobodan Živojinović (United Kingdom) Colin Dowdeswell (Ecuador) Raúl Viver (Australia) Kim Warwick
23 Jul	Kitzbühel, Austria; Clay – $100,000 – 48S/24D	(France) Henri Leconte (France) Pascal Portes; 2–6, 7–6, 7–6	(United Kingdom) Colin Dowdeswell (Poland) Wojciech Fibak	(France) Henri Leconte (United States) Brian Teacher	(Socialist Federal Republic of Yugoslavia) Slobodan Živojinović (United Kingdom) Colin Dowdeswell (Ecuador) Raúl Viver (Australia) Kim Warwick
30 Jul	Livingston Open; Livingston, New Jersey, US; Hard – $75,000 – 32S/16D; Singles – Doubles	(United States) Johan Kriek; 6–2, 6–4	(West Germany) Michael Westphal	(United States) Bob Green (United States) Vincent Van Patten	(United States) Leif Shiras (United States) Sammy Giammalva (United States) Mike De Palmer (United States) Dan Cassidy
30 Jul	Livingston Open; Livingston, New Jersey, US; Hard – $75,000 – 32S/16D; Singles – Doubles	(United States) Scott Davis (United States) Ben Testerman; 6–4, 6–4	(United States) Paul Annacone (Canada) Glenn Michibata	(United States) Bob Green (United States) Vincent Van Patten	(United States) Leif Shiras (United States) Sammy Giammalva (United States) Mike De Palmer (United States) Dan Cassidy
30 Jul	Volvo International; North Conway, New Hampshire, Clay – $255,000 – 64S/32D; Singles – Doubles	(Sweden) Joakim Nyström; 6–2, 7–5	(United States) Tim Wilkison	(Spain) Juan Aguilera (Paraguay) Víctor Pecci	(Ecuador) Andrés Gómez (Italy) Francesco Cancellotti (United States) Jay Lapidus (United States) Blaine Willenborg
30 Jul	Volvo International; North Conway, New Hampshire, Clay – $255,000 – 64S/32D; Singles – Doubles	(United States) Brian Gottfried (Czechoslovakia) Tomáš Šmíd; 6–4, 6–2	(Brazil) Cássio Motta (United States) Blaine Willenborg	(Spain) Juan Aguilera (Paraguay) Víctor Pecci	(Ecuador) Andrés Gómez (Italy) Francesco Cancellotti (United States) Jay Lapidus (United States) Blaine Willenborg

=== August ===
Week	Tournament	Champions	Runners-up	Semifinalists	Quarterfinalists
6 Aug
6 Aug	Cleveland, Ohio, US; Hard - $75,000	(United States) Terry Moor; 3–6, 7–6, 6–2	(United States) Marty Davis	(United States) Matt Mitchell (United States) Jeff Klaparda	(United States) David Dowlen (United States) David Pate (United States) Greg Holmes (United States) Mike De Palmer
6 Aug	Cleveland, Ohio, US; Hard - $75,000	(Paraguay) Francisco González (United States) Matt Mitchell; 7–6, 7–5	(United States) Scott Davis (United States) Chris Dunk	(United States) Matt Mitchell (United States) Jeff Klaparda	(United States) David Dowlen (United States) David Pate (United States) Greg Holmes (United States) Mike De Palmer
6 Aug	US Clay Court Championships; Indianapolis, Indiana; Clay - $300,000; Singles – Doubles	(Ecuador) Andrés Gómez; 6–0, 7–6	(Hungary) Balázs Taróczy	(Switzerland) Heinz Günthardt (Czechoslovakia) Libor Pimek	(Peru) Pablo Arraya (France) Thierry Tulasne (Chile) Hans Gildemeister (Argentina) Martín Jaite
6 Aug	US Clay Court Championships; Indianapolis, Indiana; Clay - $300,000; Singles – Doubles	(United States) Ken Flach (United States) Robert Seguso; 7–6, 7–5	(Switzerland) Heinz Günthardt (Hungary) Balázs Taróczy	(Switzerland) Heinz Günthardt (Czechoslovakia) Libor Pimek	(Peru) Pablo Arraya (France) Thierry Tulasne (Chile) Hans Gildemeister (Argentina) Martín Jaite
13 Aug	Buckeye Tennis Classic; Columbus, Ohio, US; Hard - $100,000; Singles – Doubles	(United States) Brad Gilbert; 6–3, 2–6, 6–3	(United States) Hank Pfister	(United States) Vincent Van Patten (Czechoslovakia) Libor Pimek	(United States) Terry Moor (South Africa) Danie Visser (United States) Sammy Giammalva (United States) Brian Teacher
13 Aug	Buckeye Tennis Classic; Columbus, Ohio, US; Hard - $100,000; Singles – Doubles	(United States) Gene Mayer (United States) Stan Smith; 6–4, 6–7, 7–5	(United States) Bud Cox (United States) Terry Moor	(United States) Vincent Van Patten (Czechoslovakia) Libor Pimek	(United States) Terry Moor (South Africa) Danie Visser (United States) Sammy Giammalva (United States) Brian Teacher
13 Aug	Canadian Open; Toronto, Ontario, Canada; Hard - $300,000; Singles – Doubles	(United States) John McEnroe; 6–0, 6–3	(United States) Vitas Gerulaitis	(South Africa) Kevin Curren (United States) Jimmy Connors	(United States) Scott McCain (United States) Jimmy Arias (United States) Eliot Teltscher (United States) Peter Fleming
13 Aug	Canadian Open; Toronto, Ontario, Canada; Hard - $300,000; Singles – Doubles	(United States) Peter Fleming (United States) John McEnroe; 6–4, 6–2	(Australia) John Fitzgerald (Australia) Kim Warwick	(South Africa) Kevin Curren (United States) Jimmy Connors	(United States) Scott McCain (United States) Jimmy Arias (United States) Eliot Teltscher (United States) Peter Fleming
20 Aug	ATP Championship; Mason, Ohio, US; Hard - $300,000; Singles – Doubles	(Sweden) Mats Wilander; 7–6, 6–3	(Sweden) Anders Järryd	(Sweden) Joakim Nyström (United States) Jimmy Connors	(Australia) Paul McNamee (United States) Dan Cassidy (United States) John Sadri (Sweden) Stefan Edberg
20 Aug	ATP Championship; Mason, Ohio, US; Hard - $300,000; Singles – Doubles	(Paraguay) Francisco González (United States) Matt Mitchell; 4–6, 6–3, 7–6	(United States) Gene Mayer (Hungary) Balázs Taróczy	(Sweden) Joakim Nyström (United States) Jimmy Connors	(Australia) Paul McNamee (United States) Dan Cassidy (United States) John Sadri (Sweden) Stefan Edberg
28 Aug	US Open; Flushing Meadow, New York, US; Grand Slam; Hard - $1,130,676; Singles – Doubles – Mixed doubles	(United States) John McEnroe; 6–3, 6–4, 6–1	(Czechoslovakia) Ivan Lendl	(United States) Jimmy Connors (Australia) Pat Cash	(United States) Gene Mayer (United Kingdom) John Lloyd (Sweden) Mats Wilander (Ecuador) Andrés Gómez
28 Aug	US Open; Flushing Meadow, New York, US; Grand Slam; Hard - $1,130,676; Singles – Doubles – Mixed doubles	(Australia) John Fitzgerald (Czechoslovakia) Tomáš Šmíd; 7–6, 6–3, 6–3	(Sweden) Stefan Edberg (Sweden) Anders Järryd	(United States) Jimmy Connors (Australia) Pat Cash	(United States) Gene Mayer (United Kingdom) John Lloyd (Sweden) Mats Wilander (Ecuador) Andrés Gómez
28 Aug	US Open; Flushing Meadow, New York, US; Grand Slam; Hard - $1,130,676; Singles – Doubles – Mixed doubles	(United States) Tom Gullikson (Bulgaria) Manuela Maleeva; 2–6, 7–5, 6–4	(Australia) John Fitzgerald (Australia) Liz Smylie	(United States) Jimmy Connors (Australia) Pat Cash	(United States) Gene Mayer (United Kingdom) John Lloyd (Sweden) Mats Wilander (Ecuador) Andrés Gómez

=== September ===
Week	Tournament	Champions	Runners-up	Semifinalists	Quarterfinalists
9 Sep	Union 76 Pacific Southwest Open; Los Angeles, US; Hard – $255,000 – 48S/24D	(United States) Jimmy Connors; 6–4, 4–6, 6–4	(United States) Eliot Teltscher	(India) Ramesh Krishnan (United States) Dan Goldie	(United States) David Pate (United States) Peter Fleming (United States) Bruce Manson (Australia) John Frawley
9 Sep	Union 76 Pacific Southwest Open; Los Angeles, US; Hard – $255,000 – 48S/24D	(United States) Ken Flach (United States) Robert Seguso; 4–6, 6–4, 6–3	(Poland) Wojciech Fibak (United States) Gene Mayer	(India) Ramesh Krishnan (United States) Dan Goldie	(United States) David Pate (United States) Peter Fleming (United States) Bruce Manson (Australia) John Frawley
9 Sep	Campionati Internazionali di Sicilia; Palermo, Italy; Clay – $100,000 – 32S/16D	(Italy) Francesco Cancellotti; 6–0, 6–3	(Czechoslovakia) Miloslav Mečíř	(Argentina) Roberto Argüello (Czechoslovakia) Tomáš Šmíd	(Uruguay) Diego Pérez (Denmark) Peter Bastiansen (Spain) Jordi Arrese (Italy) Luca Bottazzi
9 Sep	Campionati Internazionali di Sicilia; Palermo, Italy; Clay – $100,000 – 32S/16D	(Czechoslovakia) Tomáš Šmíd (United States) Blaine Willenborg; 6–7, 6–3, 6–0	(Italy) Claudio Panatta (Sweden) Henrik Sundström	(Argentina) Roberto Argüello (Czechoslovakia) Tomáš Šmíd	(Uruguay) Diego Pérez (Denmark) Peter Bastiansen (Spain) Jordi Arrese (Italy) Luca Bottazzi
9 Sep	Tel Aviv Open; Tel Aviv Ramat Hasharon, Israel; Hard - $75,000; Singles – Doubles	(United States) Aaron Krickstein; 6–4, 6–1	(Israel) Shahar Perkiss	(United States) Bob Green (Israel) Amos Mansdorf	(Switzerland) Jakob Hlasek (Israel) Shlomo Glickstein (United States) Brian Levine (United States) Marc Flur
9 Sep	Tel Aviv Open; Tel Aviv Ramat Hasharon, Israel; Hard - $75,000; Singles – Doubles	(Australia) Peter Doohan (United States) Brian Levine; 6–3, 6–4	(United Kingdom) Colin Dowdeswell (Switzerland) Jakob Hlasek	(United States) Bob Green (Israel) Amos Mansdorf	(Switzerland) Jakob Hlasek (Israel) Shlomo Glickstein (United States) Brian Levine (United States) Marc Flur
17 Sep	Transamerica Open; San Francisco, California, US; Carpet – $200,000 – 32S/16D; Singles – Doubles	(United States) John McEnroe; 6–4, 6–4	(United States) Brad Gilbert	(United States) Eliot Teltscher (United States) Terry Moor	(United Kingdom) John Lloyd (South Africa) Kevin Curren (Sweden) Thomas Högstedt (United States) Bill Scanlon
17 Sep	Transamerica Open; San Francisco, California, US; Carpet – $200,000 – 32S/16D; Singles – Doubles	(United States) Peter Fleming (United States) John McEnroe; 6–3, 6–4	(United States) Mike De Palmer (United States) Sammy Giammalva	(United States) Eliot Teltscher (United States) Terry Moor	(United Kingdom) John Lloyd (South Africa) Kevin Curren (Sweden) Thomas Högstedt (United States) Bill Scanlon
17 Sep	Bordeaux Open; Bordeaux, France; Clay – $75,000 – 32S/16D	(Spain) José Higueras; 7–6, 6–1	(Italy) Francesco Cancellotti	(United States) Jimmy Brown (Paraguay) Víctor Pecci	(Czechoslovakia) Miloslav Mečíř (Czechoslovakia) Pavel Složil (France) Guy Forget (Sweden) Joakim Nyström
17 Sep	Bordeaux Open; Bordeaux, France; Clay – $75,000 – 32S/16D	(Czechoslovakia) Pavel Složil (United States) Blaine Willenborg; 6–1, 6–4	(France) Loïc Courteau (France) Guy Forget	(United States) Jimmy Brown (Paraguay) Víctor Pecci	(Czechoslovakia) Miloslav Mečíř (Czechoslovakia) Pavel Složil (France) Guy Forget (Sweden) Joakim Nyström
17 Sep	Geneva Open; Geneva, Switzerland; Clay – $100,000 – 32S/16D; Singles – Doubles	(United States) Aaron Krickstein; 6–7, 6–1, 6–4	(Sweden) Henrik Sundström	(Argentina) Alejandro Ganzábal (Czechoslovakia) Libor Pimek	(Sweden) Mats Wilander (Czechoslovakia) Tomáš Šmíd (Spain) Juan Aguilera (West Germany) Damir Keretić
17 Sep	Geneva Open; Geneva, Switzerland; Clay – $100,000 – 32S/16D; Singles – Doubles	(Denmark) Michael Mortensen (Sweden) Mats Wilander; 6–1, 4–6, 7–5	(Czechoslovakia) Libor Pimek (Czechoslovakia) Tomáš Šmíd	(Argentina) Alejandro Ganzábal (Czechoslovakia) Libor Pimek	(Sweden) Mats Wilander (Czechoslovakia) Tomáš Šmíd (Spain) Juan Aguilera (West Germany) Damir Keretić
24 Sep	Seiko Super Tennis Hawaii; Honolulu, Hawaii, US; Carpet – $100,000 – 32S/16D; Singles – Doubles	(United States) Marty Davis; 6–1, 6–2	(United States) David Pate	(United States) Greg Holmes (United States) John Sadri	(United States) Paul Annacone (United States) Sammy Giammalva (United States) Brad Gilbert (United States) Mark Dickson
24 Sep	Seiko Super Tennis Hawaii; Honolulu, Hawaii, US; Carpet – $100,000 – 32S/16D; Singles – Doubles	(United States) Gary Donnelly (United States) Butch Walts; 7–6, 6–4	(United States) Mark Dickson (United States) Mike Leach	(United States) Greg Holmes (United States) John Sadri	(United States) Paul Annacone (United States) Sammy Giammalva (United States) Brad Gilbert (United States) Mark Dickson
24 Sep	Davis Cup semifinals Portland, OR, United States – carpet (i); Båstad, Sweden – clay	Semifinal Winners; United States 4–1; Sweden 5–0	Semifinal Losers; Australia; Czechoslovakia		

=== October ===
Week	Tournament	Champions	Runners-up	Semifinalists	Quarterfinalists
1 Oct	Torneo Godó; Barcelona, Spain; Clay – $225,000 – 64S/32D; Singles – Doubles	(Sweden) Mats Wilander; 7–6, 6–4, 0–6, 6–2	(Sweden) Joakim Nyström	(Sweden) Henrik Sundström (West Germany) Hans Schwaier	(Argentina) Martín Jaite (Spain) Alberto Tous (Czechoslovakia) Miloslav Mečíř (United States) Jimmy Arias
1 Oct	Torneo Godó; Barcelona, Spain; Clay – $225,000 – 64S/32D; Singles – Doubles	(Czechoslovakia) Pavel Složil (Czechoslovakia) Tomáš Šmíd; 6–2, 6–0	(Argentina) Martín Jaite (Paraguay) Víctor Pecci	(Sweden) Henrik Sundström (West Germany) Hans Schwaier	(Argentina) Martín Jaite (Spain) Alberto Tous (Czechoslovakia) Miloslav Mečíř (United States) Jimmy Arias
1 Oct	GWA Mazda Tennis Classic; Brisbane, Australia; Carpet – $100,000 – 32S/16D	(United States) Eliot Teltscher; 3–6, 6–3, 6–4	(Paraguay) Francisco González	(United States) Chip Hooper (United States) Mark Dickson	(United States) Ben Testerman (Australia) John Frawley (United States) Mike Leach (United States) Todd Nelson
1 Oct	GWA Mazda Tennis Classic; Brisbane, Australia; Carpet – $100,000 – 32S/16D	(Paraguay) Francisco González (United States) Matt Mitchell; 6–7, 6–2, 7–5	(Australia) Broderick Dyke (Australia) Wally Masur	(United States) Chip Hooper (United States) Mark Dickson	(United States) Ben Testerman (Australia) John Frawley (United States) Mike Leach (United States) Todd Nelson
8 Oct	Australian Indoor; Sydney, Australia; Hard (i) – $225,000 – 32S/16D; Singles – Doubles	(Sweden) Anders Järryd; 6–3, 6–2, 6–4	(Czechoslovakia) Ivan Lendl	(United States) Eliot Teltscher (United States) Ben Testerman	(United States) Peter Fleming (Australia) Brad Drewett (United States) Mike De Palmer (India) Vijay Amritraj
8 Oct	Australian Indoor; Sydney, Australia; Hard (i) – $225,000 – 32S/16D; Singles – Doubles	(Sweden) Anders Järryd (Sweden) Hans Simonsson; 6–4, 6–4	(Australia) Mark Edmondson (United States) Sherwood Stewart	(United States) Eliot Teltscher (United States) Ben Testerman	(United States) Peter Fleming (Australia) Brad Drewett (United States) Mike De Palmer (India) Vijay Amritraj
8 Oct	Japan Open; Tokyo, Japan; Hard – $150,000 – 64S/32D; Singles – Doubles	(United States) David Pate; 6–3, 7–5	(United States) Terry Moor	(United States) Jay Lapidus (United States) Brad Gilbert	(New Zealand) Bruce Derlin (United States) Larry Stefanki (India) Ramesh Krishnan (United States) Drew Gitlin
8 Oct	Japan Open; Tokyo, Japan; Hard – $150,000 – 64S/32D; Singles – Doubles	(United States) David Dowlen (Nigeria) Nduka Odizor; 6–7, 6–4, 6–3	(United States) Mark Dickson (United States) Steve Meister	(United States) Jay Lapidus (United States) Brad Gilbert	(New Zealand) Bruce Derlin (United States) Larry Stefanki (India) Ramesh Krishnan (United States) Drew Gitlin
8 Oct	Swiss Indoors; Basel, Switzerland; Hard (i) – $125,000 – 32S/16D	(Sweden) Joakim Nyström; 6–3, 3–6, 6–4, 6–2	(United States) Tim Wilkison	(Sweden) Stefan Edberg (Netherlands) Michiel Schapers	(Czechoslovakia) Tomáš Šmíd (Czechoslovakia) Pavel Složil (Argentina) Guillermo Vilas (United States) Jimmy Brown
8 Oct	Swiss Indoors; Basel, Switzerland; Hard (i) – $125,000 – 32S/16D	(Czechoslovakia) Pavel Složil (Czechoslovakia) Tomáš Šmíd; 7–6, 6–2	(Sweden) Stefan Edberg (United States) Tim Wilkison	(Sweden) Stefan Edberg (Netherlands) Michiel Schapers	(Czechoslovakia) Tomáš Šmíd (Czechoslovakia) Pavel Složil (Argentina) Guillermo Vilas (United States) Jimmy Brown
15 Oct	Tokyo Indoor; Tokyo, Japan; Carpet – $375,000 – 64S/32D; Singles – Doubles	(United States) Jimmy Connors; 6–4, 3–6, 6–0	(Czechoslovakia) Ivan Lendl	(Ecuador) Andrés Gómez (India) Ramesh Krishnan	(United States) Mark Dickson (Sweden) Mats Wilander (United States) Eric Korita (India) Vijay Amritraj
15 Oct	Tokyo Indoor; Tokyo, Japan; Carpet – $375,000 – 64S/32D; Singles – Doubles	(United States) Tony Giammalva (United States) Sammy Giammalva; 7–6, 6–4	(Australia) Mark Edmondson (United States) Sherwood Stewart	(Ecuador) Andrés Gómez (India) Ramesh Krishnan	(United States) Mark Dickson (Sweden) Mats Wilander (United States) Eric Korita (India) Vijay Amritraj
15 Oct	Black & Decker Indoor Championships; Melbourne, Australia; Carpet – $150,000 – 32S/16D	(United States) Matt Mitchell; 6–4, 3–6, 6–2	(Australia) Pat Cash	(United States) Mike Bauer (United States) Chip Hooper	(Australia) Brad Drewett (United States) Marcel Freeman (United States) Mike Leach (Australia) Wally Masur
15 Oct	Black & Decker Indoor Championships; Melbourne, Australia; Carpet – $150,000 – 32S/16D	(Australia) Broderick Dyke (Australia) Wally Masur; 6–2, 6–3	(Australia) Peter Johnston (Australia) John McCurdy	(United States) Mike Bauer (United States) Chip Hooper	(Australia) Brad Drewett (United States) Marcel Freeman (United States) Mike Leach (Australia) Wally Masur
15 Oct	Cologne Cup; Cologne, West Germany; Hard (i) – $75,000 – 32S/16D	(Sweden) Joakim Nyström; 7–6, 6–2	(Czechoslovakia) Miloslav Mečíř	(Socialist Federal Republic of Yugoslavia) Marko Ostoja (United States) Tim Wilkison	(United States) Sandy Mayer (Sweden) Jan Gunnarsson (Czechoslovakia) Pavel Složil (Sweden) Stefan Edberg
15 Oct	Cologne Cup; Cologne, West Germany; Hard (i) – $75,000 – 32S/16D	(Poland) Wojciech Fibak (United States) Sandy Mayer; 6–1, 6–3	(Sweden) Jan Gunnarsson (Sweden) Joakim Nyström	(Socialist Federal Republic of Yugoslavia) Marko Ostoja (United States) Tim Wilkison	(United States) Sandy Mayer (Sweden) Jan Gunnarsson (Czechoslovakia) Pavel Složil (Sweden) Stefan Edberg
22 Oct	Fischer-Grand Prix; Vienna, Austria; Hard – $100,000 – 32S/16D; Singles – Doubles	(United States) Tim Wilkison; 6–1, 6–1, 6–2	(Czechoslovakia) Pavel Složil	(United States) Mel Purcell (France) Henri Leconte	(United States) Jimmy Brown (Switzerland) Heinz Günthardt (Poland) Wojciech Fibak (Sweden) Jan Gunnarsson
22 Oct	Fischer-Grand Prix; Vienna, Austria; Hard – $100,000 – 32S/16D; Singles – Doubles	(Poland) Wojciech Fibak (United States) Sandy Mayer; 6–4, 6–4	(Switzerland) Heinz Günthardt (Hungary) Balázs Taróczy	(United States) Mel Purcell (France) Henri Leconte	(United States) Jimmy Brown (Switzerland) Heinz Günthardt (Poland) Wojciech Fibak (Sweden) Jan Gunnarsson
22 Oct	Seiko Super Tennis Hong Kong; Hong Kong, Hong Kong; Hard – $200,000 – 32S/16D	(Ecuador) Andrés Gómez; 6–3, 6–2	(Czechoslovakia) Tomáš Šmíd	(United States) Terry Moor (United States) Brad Gilbert	(United States) Mike Bauer (United States) Bob Green (United States) John Sadri (India) Ramesh Krishnan
22 Oct	Seiko Super Tennis Hong Kong; Hong Kong, Hong Kong; Hard – $200,000 – 32S/16D	(United States) Ken Flach (United States) Robert Seguso; 6–7, 6–3, 7–5	(Australia) Mark Edmondson (Australia) Paul McNamee	(United States) Terry Moor (United States) Brad Gilbert	(United States) Mike Bauer (United States) Bob Green (United States) John Sadri (India) Ramesh Krishnan
29 Oct	Stockholm Open; Stockholm, Sweden; Hard – $315,000 – 48S/24D; Singles – Doubles	(United States) John McEnroe; 6–2, 3–6, 6–2	(Sweden) Mats Wilander	(Sweden) Anders Järryd (United States) Jimmy Connors	(Poland) Wojciech Fibak (Sweden) Joakim Nyström (France) Guy Forget (United States) Johan Kriek
29 Oct	Stockholm Open; Stockholm, Sweden; Hard – $315,000 – 48S/24D; Singles – Doubles	(France) Henri Leconte (Czechoslovakia) Tomáš Šmíd; 7–5, 7–5	(India) Vijay Amritraj (Romania) Ilie Năstase	(Sweden) Anders Järryd (United States) Jimmy Connors	(Poland) Wojciech Fibak (Sweden) Joakim Nyström (France) Guy Forget (United States) Johan Kriek
29 Oct	Taipei International Championships; Taipei, Taiwan; Carpet – $75,000 – 32S/16D; Singles – Doubles	(United States) Brad Gilbert; 6–3, 6–3	(Australia) Wally Masur	(United States) Larry Stefanki (India) Ramesh Krishnan	(United States) Marty Davis (United States) Robert Seguso (United States) Hank Pfister (United States) Lloyd Bourne
29 Oct	Taipei International Championships; Taipei, Taiwan; Carpet – $75,000 – 32S/16D; Singles – Doubles	(United States) Ken Flach (United States) Robert Seguso; 6–1, 6–7, 6–2	(United States) Drew Gitlin (United States) Hank Pfister	(United States) Larry Stefanki (India) Ramesh Krishnan	(United States) Marty Davis (United States) Robert Seguso (United States) Hank Pfister (United States) Lloyd Bourne

=== November ===
Week	Tournament	Champions	Runners-up	Semifinalists	Quarterfinalists
5 Nov	Benson and Hedges Championships; London, Great Britain; Carpet – $315,0000 – 32S/16D	(Czechoslovakia) Ivan Lendl; 7–6, 6–2, 6–1	(Ecuador) Andrés Gómez	(United States) Peter Fleming (United States) Jimmy Connors	(Brazil) Cássio Motta (United States) Vitas Gerulaitis (Hungary) Balázs Taróczy (France) Guy Forget
5 Nov	Benson and Hedges Championships; London, Great Britain; Carpet – $315,0000 – 32S/16D	(Ecuador) Andrés Gómez (Czechoslovakia) Ivan Lendl; 6–2, 6–2	(Czechoslovakia) Pavel Složil (Czechoslovakia) Tomáš Šmíd	(United States) Peter Fleming (United States) Jimmy Connors	(Brazil) Cássio Motta (United States) Vitas Gerulaitis (Hungary) Balázs Taróczy (France) Guy Forget
12 Nov	Torneo Internazionale Citta di Treviso; Treviso, Italy; Carpet - $75,000 – 32S/16D	(United States) Vitas Gerulaitis; 6–1, 6–1	(France) Tarik Benhabiles	(United States) John Sadri (United States) Tim Wilkison	(Sweden) Jan Gunnarsson (Italy) Claudio Panatta (United States) Todd Nelson (West Germany) Hans Schwaier
12 Nov	Torneo Internazionale Citta di Treviso; Treviso, Italy; Carpet - $75,000 – 32S/16D	(Czechoslovakia) Pavel Složil (United States) Tim Wilkison; 6–2, 6–3	(Sweden) Jan Gunnarsson (United States) Sherwood Stewart	(United States) John Sadri (United States) Tim Wilkison	(Sweden) Jan Gunnarsson (Italy) Claudio Panatta (United States) Todd Nelson (West Germany) Hans Schwaier
19 Nov	South African Open; Johannesburg, South Africa; Hard - $200,000	(United States) Eliot Teltscher; 6–3, 6–1, 7–6	(United States) Vitas Gerulaitis	(United States) Steve Meister (United States) Brad Gilbert	(United Kingdom) Colin Dowdeswell (United States) Bob Green (Argentina) José Luis Clerc (Australia) John Fitzgerald
19 Nov	South African Open; Johannesburg, South Africa; Hard - $200,000	(United States) Tracy Delatte (Paraguay) Francisco González; 7–6, 6–1	(United States) Steve Meister (United States) Eliot Teltscher	(United States) Steve Meister (United States) Brad Gilbert	(United Kingdom) Colin Dowdeswell (United States) Bob Green (Argentina) José Luis Clerc (Australia) John Fitzgerald
19 Nov	Nabisco Grand Prix de Toulouse; Toulouse, France; Hard (i) – $100,000 – 32S/16D	(United States) Mark Dickson; 7–6^{(7–2)}, 6–4	(Switzerland) Heinz Günthardt	(Sweden) Anders Järryd (West Germany) Michael Westphal	(Czechoslovakia) Jaroslav Navrátil (France) Pascal Portes (West Germany) Ricki Osterthun (France) Yannick Noah
19 Nov	Nabisco Grand Prix de Toulouse; Toulouse, France; Hard (i) – $100,000 – 32S/16D	(Sweden) Jan Gunnarsson (Denmark) Michael Mortensen; 6–4, 6–2	(Czechoslovakia) Pavel Složil (United States) Tim Wilkison	(Sweden) Anders Järryd (West Germany) Michael Westphal	(Czechoslovakia) Jaroslav Navrátil (France) Pascal Portes (West Germany) Ricki Osterthun (France) Yannick Noah
26 Nov; 9 Dec	Australian Open; Melbourne, Australia; Grand Slam; Grass - $558,405; Singles – Doubles	(Sweden) Mats Wilander; 6–7^{(5–7)}, 6–4, 7–6^{(7–3)}, 6–2	(South Africa) Kevin Curren	(United States) Ben Testerman (United States) Johan Kriek	(United States) Scott Davis (West Germany) Boris Becker (Australia) Pat Cash (Sweden) Stefan Edberg
26 Nov; 9 Dec	Australian Open; Melbourne, Australia; Grand Slam; Grass - $558,405; Singles – Doubles	(Australia) Mark Edmondson (United States) Sherwood Stewart; 6–2, 6–2, 7–5	(Sweden) Joakim Nyström (Sweden) Mats Wilander	(United States) Ben Testerman (United States) Johan Kriek	(United States) Scott Davis (West Germany) Boris Becker (Australia) Pat Cash (Sweden) Stefan Edberg

=== December ===
Week	Tournament	Champions	Runners-up	Semifinalists	Quarterfinalists
10 Dec	New South Wales Championships; Sydney, Australia; Grass – $125,000 – 64S/32D; Singles – Doubles	(Australia) John Fitzgerald; 6–3, 6–3	(United States) Sammy Giammalva	(United States) Johan Kriek (South Africa) Kevin Curren	(United States) Marty Davis (United States) Bill Scanlon (United States) Ben Testerman (United States) Tom Gullikson
10 Dec	New South Wales Championships; Sydney, Australia; Grass – $125,000 – 64S/32D; Singles – Doubles	(United States) Paul Annacone (South Africa) Christo van Rensburg; 7–6, 7–5	(United States) Tom Gullikson (United States) Scott McCain	(United States) Johan Kriek (South Africa) Kevin Curren	(United States) Marty Davis (United States) Bill Scanlon (United States) Ben Testerman (United States) Tom Gullikson
10 Dec	Davis Cup final Gothenburg, Sweden – clay (i)	Sweden; 4–1	United States		
17 Dec	South Australian Open; Adelaide, Australia; Grass – $75,000 – 32S/16D; Singles – Doubles	(Australia) Peter Doohan; 1–6, 6–1, 6–4	(Netherlands) Huub van Boeckel	(United States) Mike Bauer (Australia) John Fitzgerald	(Israel) Shahar Perkiss (Australia) John Frawley (Czechoslovakia) Miloslav Mečíř (United States) Tim Mayotte
17 Dec	South Australian Open; Adelaide, Australia; Grass – $75,000 – 32S/16D; Singles – Doubles	(Australia) Broderick Dyke (Australia) Wally Masur; 4–6, 7–5, 6–1	(Australia) Peter Doohan (South Africa) Brian Levine	(United States) Mike Bauer (Australia) John Fitzgerald	(Israel) Shahar Perkiss (Australia) John Frawley (Czechoslovakia) Miloslav Mečíř (United States) Tim Mayotte
24 Dec	Melbourne Outdoor; Melbourne, Australia; Grass – $75,000 – 32S/16D	(United States) Dan Cassidy; 7–6, 7–6	(Australia) John Fitzgerald	(United States) Matt Anger (Switzerland) Jakob Hlasek	(Netherlands) Huub van Boeckel (South Africa) Christo van Rensburg (United Kingdom) Colin Dowdeswell (Australia) Brad Drewett
24 Dec	Melbourne Outdoor; Melbourne, Australia; Grass – $75,000 – 32S/16D	(Australia) Broderick Dyke (Australia) Wally Masur; 7–6, 3–6, 7–6	(United States) Mike Bauer (United States) Scott McCain	(United States) Matt Anger (Switzerland) Jakob Hlasek	(Netherlands) Huub van Boeckel (South Africa) Christo van Rensburg (United Kingdom) Colin Dowdeswell (Australia) Brad Drewett

=== January 1985 ===
Week	Tournament	Champions	Runners-up	Semifinalists	Quarterfinalists
7 Jan	Volvo Masters; New York, United States; Carpet – $400,000 – 12S/6D; Singles – Doubles	(United States) John McEnroe; 7–5, 6–0, 6–4	(Czechoslovakia) Ivan Lendl	(Sweden) Mats Wilander (United States) Jimmy Connors	(Sweden) Anders Järryd (United States) Johan Kriek (Sweden) Joakim Nyström (United States) Eliot Teltscher
7 Jan	Volvo Masters; New York, United States; Carpet – $400,000 – 12S/6D; Singles – Doubles	(United States) Peter Fleming (United States) John McEnroe; 6–3, 6–1	(Australia) Mark Edmondson (United States) Sherwood Stewart	(Sweden) Mats Wilander (United States) Jimmy Connors	(Sweden) Anders Järryd (United States) Johan Kriek (Sweden) Joakim Nyström (United States) Eliot Teltscher

== Grand Prix rankings ==
As of 2 January 1984
Rk	Name	Nation
1	John McEnroe	USA
2	Ivan Lendl	TCH
3	Jimmy Connors	USA
4	Mats Wilander	SWE
5	Yannick Noah	FRA
6	Jimmy Arias	USA
7	José Higueras	ESP
8	José Luis Clerc	ARG
9	Kevin Curren	RSA
10	Gene Mayer	USA
11	Guillermo Vilas	ARG
12	Bill Scanlon	USA
13	Eliot Teltscher	ARG
14	Andrés Gómez	ECU
15	Johan Kriek	USA
16	Tim Mayotte	USA
17	Tomáš Šmíd	TCH
18	Sandy Mayer	USA
19	Anders Järryd	SWE
20	Vitas Gerulaitis	USA

Year-end rankings 1984 (2 January 1985)
Rk	Name	Nation	Points	High	Low	Change
1	John McEnroe	USA	3,393			=
2	Jimmy Connors	USA	2,903			▲ +1
3	Ivan Lendl	TCH	2,714			▼ –1
4	Mats Wilander	SWE	2,450			=
5	Andrés Gómez	ECU	2,223			▲ +9
6	Anders Järryd	SWE				▲ +13
7	Henrik Sundström	SWE				▲ +16
8	Pat Cash	AUS				▲ +30
9	Eliot Teltscher	USA				▲ +4
10	Yannick Noah	FRA				▼ –5
11	Joakim Nyström	SWE				▲ +16
12	Aaron Krickstein	USA				▲ +82
13	Johan Kriek	USA				▲ +2
14	Jimmy Arias	USA				▼ –8
15	Kevin Curren	RSA				▼ –6
16	Tomáš Šmíd	TCH				▲ +1
17	Vitas Gerulaitis	USA				▲ +3
18	Gene Mayer	USA				▼ –8
19	Juan Aguilera	ESP				▲ +45
20	Stefan Edberg	SWE				▲ +33

*The official ATP year-end rankings were listed from January 2, 1985.

== List of tournament winners ==
The list of winners and number of singles titles won, alphabetically by last name:

- (Spain) Juan Aguilera (2) Aix-en-Provence, Hamburg
- (India) Vijay Amritraj (1) Newport
- (Italy) Francesco Cancellotti (2) Florence, Palermo
- (United States) Dan Cassidy (1) Melbourne
- (United States) Jimmy Connors (5) Memphis, La Quinta, Boca West, Los Angeles, Tokyo Indoor
- (United States) Marty Davis (1) Honolulu
- (United States) Mark Dickson (1) Houston WCT, Toulouse
- (Australia) Peter Doohan (1) Adelaide
- (Sweden) Stefan Edberg (1) Milan
- (Australia) John Fritzgerald (1) Sydney Outdoor
- (United States) Vitas Gerulaitis (1) Treviso
- (United States) Brad Gilbert (2) Columbus, Taiwan
- (Ecuador) Andrés Gómez (5) Nice, Rome, Washington, D.C., Indianapolis, Hong Kong
- (Spain) José Higueras (2) Kitzbühel, Bordeaux
- (Sweden) Anders Järryd (2) Hilversum, Sydney Indoor
- (United States) Aaron Krickstein (3) Boston, Tel Aviv, Geneva
- (United States) Johan Kriek (2) Bristol, Livingston
- (India) Ramesh Krishnan (1) Metz
- (France) Henri Leconte (1) Stuttgart Outdoor
- (Czechoslovakia) Ivan Lendl (3) Luxembourg, French Open, Wembley
- (United States) John McEnroe (13) Philadelphia, Richmond WCT, Madrid, Brussels, Queen's Club, Wimbledon, Dallas WCT, Forest Hills WCT, Toronto, US Open, San Francisco, Stockholm, Masters
- (Australia) Paul McNamee (1) Houston
- (United States) Matt Mitchell (1) Melbourne Indoor
- (United States) Terry Moor (1) Cleveland
- (Sweden) Joakim Nyström (4) Gstaad, North Conway, Basel, Cologne
- (United States) David Pate (1) Tokyo Outdoor
- (Czechoslovakia) Libor Pimek (1) Munich
- (United States) Danny Saltz (1) Auckland
- (Sweden) Henrik Sundström (3) Bari, Monte Carlo, Båstad
- (United States) Eliot Teltscher (2) Brisbane, Johannesburg
- (Sweden) Mats Wilander (3) Cincinnati, Barcelona, Australian Open
- (United States) Tim Wilkison (1) Vienna

The following players won their first title in 1984:

- (Spain) Juan Aguilera (Aix-en-Provence)
- (Italy) Francesco Cancellotti (Florence)
- (United States) Dan Cassidy (Melbourne)
- (United States) Mark Dickson (Houston WCT)
- (Australia) Peter Doohan (Adelaide)
- (Sweden) Stefan Edberg( Milan)
- (United States) Matt Mitchell (Melbourne Indoor)
- (United States) Terry Moor (Cleveland)
- (United States) David Pate (Tokyo Outdoor)
- (Czechoslovakia) Libor Pimek (Munich)
- (United States) Danny Saltz (Auckland)

== See also ==
- 1984 World Championship Tennis circuit
- 1984 Virginia Slims World Championship Series
