= 1984 Torneo Internazionale Citta di Treviso =

Tennis tournament

- Date: 12–18 November
- Edition: 1st
- Category: Grand Prix
- Draw: 32S / 16D
- Prize money: $75,000
- Surface: Carpet / indoor
- Location: Treviso, Italy

Champions

Singles
- (United States) Vitas Gerulaitis

Doubles
- (Czechoslovakia) Pavel Složil / (United States) Tim Wilkison
- Torneo Internazionale Citta di Treviso

The 1984 Torneo Internazionale Citta di Treviso was a men's tennis tournament played on indoor carpet courts in Treviso, Italy that was part of the 1984 Volvo Grand Prix circuit. It was the only edition of the tournament and was played from 12 November until 18 November 1984. First-seeded Vitas Gerulaitis won the singles title.

== Finals ==
=== Singles ===
(United States) Vitas Gerulaitis defeated (France) Tarik Benhabiles 6–1, 6–1

- It was Gerulaitis' only singles title of the year and the 26th and last of his career.

=== Doubles ===
(Czechoslovakia) Pavel Složil / (United States) Tim Wilkison defeated (Sweden) Jan Gunnarsson / (United States) Sherwood Stewart 6–2, 6–3

- It was Složil's 7th doubles title of they year and the 26th of his career. It was Wilkison's only doubles title of the year and the 4th of his career.
