= 1984 ABN World Tennis Tournament =

- Date: 12–18 March
- Edition: 12th
- Category: Grand Prix circuit
- Draw: 32S / 16D
- Prize money: US$ 250,000
- Surface: Carpet / indoor
- Location: Rotterdam, Netherlands
- Venue: Rotterdam Ahoy

Champions

Singles
- None

Doubles
- (South Africa) Kevin Curren / (Poland) Wojciech Fibak
- ABN World Tennis Tournament

The 1984 ABN World Tennis Tournament was a men's tennis tournament played on indoor carpet courts at Rotterdam Ahoy in the Netherlands. It was part of the 1984 Volvo Grand Prix circuit. The tournament was held from 12 March through 18 March 1984. The singles final between Ivan Lendl and Jimmy Connors was stopped at 6–0, 1–0 because the Ahoy Arena had received an anonymous telephone bomb threat. The police searched the venue but no bomb was found. The match was not resumed and officially has no winner.

== Finals ==
=== Singles ===
(Czechoslovakia) Ivan Lendl led (United States) Jimmy Connors 6–0, 1–0 canc.
Lendl and Connors both received runners-up finishes.

=== Doubles ===
(South Africa) Kevin Curren / (Poland) Wojciech Fibak defeated (United States) Fritz Buehning / (Australia) Ferdi Taygan 6–4, 6–4
