= 1984 Fischer-Grand Prix =

- Date: 22–29 October
- Edition: 10th
- Category: Grand Prix
- Draw: 32S / 16D
- Prize money: $100,000
- Surface: Hard / indoor
- Location: Vienna, Austria
- Venue: Wiener Stadthalle

Champions

Singles
- (United States) Tim Wilkison

Doubles
- (Poland) Wojciech Fibak / (United States) Sandy Mayer
- Vienna Open

The 1984 Fischer-Grand Prix was a men's tennis tournament played on indoor hard courts at the Wiener Stadthalle in Vienna, Austria that was part of the 1984 Volvo Grand Prix. It was the tenth edition of the tournament and was held from 22 October until 29 October 1984. Eighth-seeded Tim Wilkison won the singles title.

== Finals ==
=== Singles ===
(United States) Tim Wilkison defeated (Czechoslovakia) Pavel Složil 6–1, 6–1, 6–2

- It was Wilkison's 1st title of the year and the 8th of his career.

=== Doubles ===
(Poland) Wojciech Fibak / (United States) Sandy Mayer defeated (Switzerland) Heinz Günthardt / (Hungary) Balázs Taróczy 6–4, 6–4

- It was Fibak's 4th title of the year and the 61st of his career. It was Mayer's 4th title of the year and the 34th of his career.
