= 1984 Cuore Tennis Cup =

1984 Cuore Cup
- Date: 19–25 March
- Edition: 7th
- Category: Grand Prix
- Draw: 32S / 16D
- Prize money: $350,000
- Surface: Carpet / indoor
- Location: Milan, Italy
- Venue: Palazzo dello Sport

Champions

Singles
- (Sweden) Stefan Edberg

Doubles
- (Czechoslovakia) Tomáš Šmíd / (Czechoslovakia) Pavel Složil
- Milan Indoor

The 1984 Milan Indoor was a men's tennis tournament played on indoor carpet courts at the Palazzo dello Sport in Milan, Italy that was part of the 1984 Volvo Grand Prix. It was the seventh edition of the tournament and was held from 19 March until 25 March 1984. Unseeded Stefan Edberg won the singles title.

== Finals ==
=== Singles ===
(Sweden) Stefan Edberg defeated (Sweden) Mats Wilander 6–4, 6–2

- It was Edberg's first singles title of his career.

=== Doubles ===
(Czech Republic) Tomáš Šmíd / (Czechoslovakia) Pavel Složil defeated (South Africa) Kevin Curren / (United States) Steve Denton 6–4, 6–3,
