= 1984 Transamerica Open =

- Date: September 17–23
- Edition: 96th
- Category: Grand Prix
- Draw: 32S / 16D
- Prize money: $200,000
- Surface: Carpet / indoor
- Location: San Francisco, U.S.
- Venue: Cow Palace

Champions

Singles
- (United States) John McEnroe

Doubles
- (United States) Peter Fleming / (United States) John McEnroe
- Pacific Coast Championships

The 1984 Transamerica Open, also known as the Pacific Coast Championships, was a men's tennis tournament played on indoor carpet courts at the Cow Palace in San Francisco, California in the United States. The event was part of the 1984 Volvo Grand Prix circuit. It was the 96th edition of the tournament and was held from September 17 through September 23, 1984. First-seeded John McEnroe won the singles title, his fourth at the event after 1978, 1979 and 1982, and earned $40,000 first-prize money. Defending champion Ivan Lendl withdrew before the tournament due to Davis Cup obligations.

== Finals ==
=== Singles ===
(United States) John McEnroe defeated (United States) Brad Gilbert 6–4, 6–4

- It was McEnroe's 11th singles title of the year and the 57th of his career.

=== Doubles ===
(United States) Peter Fleming / (United States) John McEnroe defeated (United States) Mike De Palmer / (United States) Sammy Giammalva Jr. 6–3, 6–4
