= 1984 Seiko Super Tennis Hong Kong =

Tennis tournament

- Date: 22–28 October
- Edition: 12th
- Category: Grand Prix
- Draw: 32S / 16D
- Prize money: $200,000
- Surface: Hard / indoor
- Location: Hong Kong

Champions

Singles
- (Venezuela) Andrés Gómez

Doubles
- (United States) Ken Flach / (United States) Robert Seguso
← 1983 ·	Hong Kong Open	· 1985 →

The 1984 Seiko Super Tennis Hong Kong, also known as the Hong Kong Open, was a men's tennis tournament played on indoor hard courts in Hong Kong that was part of the 1984 Grand Prix tennis circuit. It was the 12th edition of the event and was held from 22 October through 28 October 1984. First-seeded Andrés Gómez won the singles title.

== Finals ==
=== Singles ===
(Venezuela) Andrés Gómez defeated (Czechoslovakia) Tomáš Šmíd 6–3, 6–2

- It was Gómez' 5th singles title of the year and the 9th of his career.

=== Doubles ===
(United States) Ken Flach / (United States) Robert Seguso defeated (Australia) Mark Edmondson / (Australia) Paul McNamee 6–7, 6–3, 7–5
