= 1984 Dutch Open (tennis) =

- Date: 23–29 July
- Edition: 27th
- Category: Grand Prix
- Draw: 32S / 16D
- Prize money: $75,000
- Surface: Clay / outdoor
- Location: Hilversum, Netherlands
- Venue: 't Melkhuisje

Champions

Singles
- (Sweden) Anders Järryd

Doubles
- (Sweden) Anders Järryd / (Czechoslovakia) Tomáš Šmíd
- Dutch Open

The 1984 Dutch Open was a Grand Prix men's tennis tournament staged in Hilversum, Netherlands. The tournament was played on outdoor clay courts and was held from 23 July until 29 July 1984. It was the 27th edition of the tournament. Anders Järryd won the singles title.

== Finals ==
=== Singles ===
(Sweden) Anders Järryd defeated (Czechoslovakia) Tomáš Šmíd 6–3, 6–3, 2–6, 6–2

- It was Järryd's 1st singles title of the year and the 3rd of his career.

=== Doubles ===
(Sweden) Anders Järryd / (Czechoslovakia) Tomáš Šmíd defeated (Australia) Broderick Dyke / (Australia) Michael Fancutt 6–4, 5–7, 7–6
