= 1984 Swiss Open =

- Date: 9–15 July
- Edition: 38th
- Category: Grand Prix
- Draw: 32S / 16D
- Prize money: $125,000
- Surface: Clay / outdoor
- Location: Gstaad, Switzerland

Champions

Singles
- (Sweden) Joakim Nyström

Doubles
- (Switzerland) Heinz Günthardt / (Switzerland) Markus Günthardt
- Suisse Open Gstaad

The 1984 Swiss Open was a men's tennis tournament played on outdoor clay courts in Gstaad, Switzerland that was part of the 1984 Volvo Grand Prix tennis circuit. It was the 38th edition of the tournament and was held from 9 July through 15 July 1984. Unseeded Joakim Nyström won the singles title.

== Finals ==
=== Singles ===
(Sweden) Joakim Nyström defeated (United States) Brian Teacher 6–4, 6–2

- It was Nyström's 1st singles title of the year and the 2nd of his career.

=== Doubles ===
(Switzerland) Heinz Günthardt / (Switzerland) Markus Günthardt defeated (Brazil) Givaldo Barbosa / (Brazil) João Soares 6–4, 3–6, 7–6
