= 1984 Campionati Internazionali di Sicilia =

- Date: 10–16 September
- Edition: 6th
- Category: Grand Prix
- Draw: 32S / 16D
- Prize money: $100,000
- Surface: Clay / outdoor
- Location: Palermo, Italy

Champions

Singles
- (Italy) Francesco Cancellotti

Doubles
- (Czechoslovakia) Tomáš Šmíd / (United States) Blaine Willenborg
- Campionati Internazionali di Sicilia

The 1984 Campionati Internazionali di Sicilia was a men's tennis tournament played on outdoor clay courts in Palermo, Italy that was part of the 1984 Volvo Grand Prix. It was the sixth edition of the tournament and took place from 10 September until 16 September 1984. Fourth-seeded Francesco Cancellotti won the singles title.

== Finals ==
=== Singles ===
(Italy) Francesco Cancellotti defeated (Czechoslovakia) Miloslav Mečíř 6–0, 6–3

- It was Cancellotti's 2nd and last singles title of the year and of his career.

=== Doubles ===
(Czechoslovakia) Tomáš Šmíd / (United States) Blaine Willenborg defeated (Italy) Claudio Panatta / (Sweden) Henrik Sundström 6–7, 6–3, 6–0
