= 1984 Buckeye Tennis Classic =

Men's outdoor tennis tournament in Ohio, US

- Date: August 13–19
- Edition: 15th
- Category: Grand Prix
- Draw: 32S / 16D
- Prize money: $100,000
- Surface: Hard / outdoor
- Location: Columbus, Ohio, United States
- Venue: Buckeye Boys Ranch

Champions

Singles
- (United States) Brad Gilbert

Doubles
- (United States) Sandy Mayer / (United States) Stan Smith
- Columbus Open

The 1984 Buckeye Tennis Classic, also known as the Columbus Open, was a men's tennis tournament played on outdoor hardcourts at the Buckeye Boys Ranch in Grove City, a suburb of Columbus, Ohio in the United States that was part of the 1984 Volvo Grand Prix circuit. It was the 15th and final edition of the tournament and was held from August 13 through August 19, 1984. Third-seeded Brad Gilbert won the singles title and earned $20,000 first-prize money.

== Finals ==
=== Singles ===
(United States) Brad Gilbert defeated (United States) Hank Pfister 6–3, 2–6, 6–3

- It was Gilbert's 1st singles title of the year and the 2nd of his career.

=== Doubles ===
(United States) Sandy Mayer / (United States) Stan Smith defeated (United States) Charles Bud Cox / (United States) Terry Moor 6–4, 6–7, 7–5
