= Torneo Internazionale Citta di Treviso =

Defunct tennis tournament
- Tour: Grand Prix circuit
- Founded: 1974
- Abolished: 1974
- Editions: 1
- Location: Treviso, Italy
- Surface: Carpet / indoor

The Torneo Internazionale Città di Treviso is a defunct men's professional tennis tournament. It was held for one year, in November 1984, in Treviso, Italy and was played on indoor carpet courts. The tournament was part of the 1984 Grand Prix circuit.

== Finals ==
=== Singles ===
Year	Champion	Runner-up	Score
1984	(United States) Vitas Gerulaitis	(France) Tarik Benhabiles	6–1, 6–1

=== Doubles ===
Year	Champion	Runner-up	Score
1984	(Czechoslovakia) Pavel Složil (United States) Tim Wilkison	(Sweden) Jan Gunnarsson (United States) Sherwood Stewart	6–2, 6–3
