= 1984 Mercedes Cup =

- Date: 16–22 July
- Edition: 7th
- Category: Grand Prix
- Draw: 32S / 16D
- Prize money: $100,000
- Surface: Clay / outdoor
- Location: Stuttgart, West Germany
- Venue: Tennis Club Weissenhof

Champions

Singles
- (France) Henri Leconte

Doubles
- (United States) Sandy Mayer / (West Germany) Andreas Maurer
- Stuttgart Open

The 1984 Mercedes Cup, was a men's tennis tournament played on outdoor clay courts and held at the Tennis Club Weissenhof in Stuttgart, West Germany that was part of the 1984 Grand Prix circuit. It was the seventh edition of the tournament and was held from 16 July until 22 July 1984. Seventh-seeded Henri Leconte won the singles title.

== Finals ==
=== Singles ===
(France) Henri Leconte defeated (United States) Gene Mayer, 7–6^{(11–9)}, 6–0, 1–6, 6–1

- It was Leconte's 1st singles title of the year and the 2nd of his career.

=== Doubles ===
(United States) Sandy Mayer / (West Germany) Andreas Maurer defeated (United States) Fritz Buehning / (United States) Ferdi Taygan, 7–6, 6–4
