= 1984 U.S. Pro Indoor =

- Date: January 23–29
- Edition: 17th
- Category: Grand Prix circuit
- Draw: 48S / 28D
- Prize money: $ 300,000
- Surface: Carpet / indoor
- Location: Philadelphia, PA, United States
- Venue: Spectrum

Champions

Singles
- (United States) John McEnroe

Doubles
- (United States) Peter Fleming / (United States) John McEnroe
- U.S. Pro Indoor

The 1984 U.S. Pro Indoor was a men's tennis tournament played on indoor carpet courts that was part of the 1984 Volvo Grand Prix. It was played at the Spectrum in Philadelphia, Pennsylvania in the United States and took place from January 23 through January 29, 1984. Second-seeded John McEnroe won his third consecutive singles title at the event.

== Finals ==
=== Singles ===
(United States) John McEnroe defeated (Czechoslovakia) Ivan Lendl 6–3, 3–6, 6–3, 7–6^{(7–3)}

- It was McEnroe's 1st singles title of the year and the 47th of his career.

=== Doubles ===
(United States) Peter Fleming / (United States) John McEnroe defeated (France) Henri Leconte / (France) Yannick Noah

- It was Fleming's 2nd title of the year and the 49th of his career. It was McEnroe's 1st title of the year and the 93rd of his career.

== See also ==
- Lendl–McEnroe rivalry
