= 1984 Roger et Gallet Cup =

Tennis tournament

- Date: 7–13 May
- Edition: 12th
- Category: Grand Prix
- Draw: 32S / 16D
- Prize money: $75,000
- Surface: Clay / outdoor
- Location: Florence, Italy

Champions

Singles
- (Italy) Francesco Cancellotti

Doubles
- (United States) Mark Dickson / (United States) Chip Hooper
- ATP Florence

The 1984 Roger et Gallet Cup was a men's tennis tournament played on outdoor clay courts in Florence, Italy that was part of the 1984 Volvo Grand Prix circuit. It was the 12th edition of the tournament and was played from 7 May until 13 May 1984. Seventh-seeded Francesco Cancellotti won the singles title.

== Finals ==
=== Singles ===
(Italy) Francesco Cancellotti defeated (United States) Jimmy Brown 6–1, 6–4

- It was Cancellotti's first singles title of his career.

=== Doubles ===
(United States) Mark Dickson / (United States) Chip Hooper defeated (South Africa) Bernard Mitton / (United States) Butch Walts 7–6, 4–6, 7–5
