= 1984 Swiss Indoors =

- Date: 8–14 October
- Edition: 15th
- Category: Grand Prix
- Draw: 32S / 16D
- Prize money: $125,000
- Surface: Hard / indoor
- Location: Basel, Switzerland
- Venue: St. Jakobshalle

Champions

Singles
- (Sweden) Joakim Nyström

Doubles
- (Czechoslovakia) Pavel Složil / (Czechoslovakia) Tomáš Šmíd
- Swiss Indoors

The 1984 Swiss Indoors was a men's tennis tournament played on indoor hard courts at the St. Jakobshalle in Basel, Switzerland that was part of the 1984 Volvo Grand Prix. It was the 15th edition of the tournament and was held from 8 October through 14 October 1984. Third-seeded Joakim Nyström won the singles title.

== Finals ==
=== Singles ===
(Sweden) Joakim Nyström defeated (United States) Tim Wilkison 6–3, 3–6, 6–4, 6–2

- It was Nyström's 3rd singles title of the year and the 4th of his career.

=== Doubles ===
(Czechoslovakia) Pavel Složil / (Czechoslovakia) Tomáš Šmíd defeated (Sweden) Stefan Edberg / (United States) Tim Wilkison 7–6, 6–2
