= 1983 Seiko Hong Kong Classic =

Tennis tournament

- Date: 31 October – 6 November
- Edition: 11th
- Category: Grand Prix
- Draw: 32S / 16D
- Prize money: $100,000
- Surface: Hard / outdoor
- Location: Hong Kong

Champions

Singles
- (Australia) Wally Masur

Doubles
- (United States) Drew Gitlin / (Australia) Craig Miller
← 1982 ·	Hong Kong Open	· 1984 →

The 1983 Seiko Hong Kong Classic, also known as the Hong Kong Open, was a men's tennis tournament played on outdoor hard courts in Hong Kong that was part of the 1983 Grand Prix tennis circuit. It was the 11th edition of the event and was held from 31 October through 6 November 1983. Unseeded Wally Masur won the singles title.

== Finals ==
=== Singles ===
(Australia) Wally Masur defeated (United States) Sammy Giammalva 6–1, 6–1

- It was Masur's first singles title of his career.

=== Doubles ===
(United States) Drew Gitlin / (Australia) Craig Miller defeated (United States) Sammy Giammalva / (United States) Steve Meister 6–2, 6–2
