= 1984 Dutch Open – Doubles =

Doubles
- 1984 Dutch Open

Final
- Champions: (Sweden) Anders Järryd (Czechoslovakia) Tomáš Šmíd
- Runners-up: (Australia) Broderick Dyke (Australia) Michael Fancutt
- Score: 6–4, 5–7, 7–6

Details
- Draw: 16
- Seeds: 4

Events
Singles	Doubles
- Dutch Open

Heinz Günthardt and Balázs Taróczy were the defending champions, but none competed this year. Taróczy opted to compete at Washington in the same week.

Anders Järryd and Tomáš Šmíd won the title by defeating Broderick Dyke and Michael Fancutt 6–4, 5–7, 7–6 in the final.

== Seeds ==
1. (Sweden) Anders Järryd / (Czechoslovakia) Tomáš Šmíd (champions)
2. (Australia) Broderick Dyke / (Australia) Michael Fancutt (final)
3. (Sweden) Jan Gunnarsson / (Denmark) Michael Mortensen (semifinals)
4. (Czechoslovakia) Stanislav Birner / (Australia) Craig A. Miller (semifinals)

== Draw ==
Key

- Q = Qualifier
- WC = Wild card
- LL = Lucky loser
- Alt = Alternate
- ITF = ITF entry
- PR = Protected ranking
- SR = Special ranking
- SE = Special exempt
- JE = Junior exempt
- JR = Junior Accelerator Programme entrant
- CO = College Accelerator Programme entrant
- NG = Next Gen Accelerator Program entrant
- w/o = Walkover
- r = Retired
- d = Defaulted

=== Draw ===
First round
1	(Sweden) A Järryd (Czechoslovakia) T Smid	6	6
(West Germany) D Vestweber (West Germany) H Beermann	2	2
(Spain) L Fargas (Spain) R Vizcaíno	5	5
(Netherlands) T Gorter (Netherlands) M Oosting	7	7
3	(Sweden) J Gunnarsson (Denmark) M Mortensen	7	7
(Spain) J Lopez-Maeso (Switzerland) R Stadler	5	5
(Socialist Federal Republic of Yugoslavia) I Flego (Switzerland) C Mezzadri	6	4	7
(Sweden) R Båthman (Sweden) P Carlsson	4	6	6
(South Africa) F Sauer (United States) A Scheinman	1	4
(Netherlands) H van Boeckel (Belgium) J Vanlangendonck	6	6
(Netherlands) M Schapers (United Kingdom) J Smith	5	5
4	(Czechoslovakia) S Birner (Australia) C A. Miller	7	7
(Peru) C di Laura (Mexico) F MacIel	6	2
(Australia) P Doohan (Australia) C Johnstone	7	6
(Argentina) C Castellan (Italy) A de Minicis	2	0
2	(Australia) B Dyke (Australia) M Fancutt	6	6

Quarterfinals
1	(Sweden) A Järryd (Czechoslovakia) T Smid	6	6
(Netherlands) T Gorter (Netherlands) M Oosting	1	3
3	(Sweden) J Gunnarsson (Denmark) M Mortensen	w/o
(Socialist Federal Republic of Yugoslavia) I Flego (Switzerland) C Mezzadri
(Netherlands) H van Boeckel (Belgium) J Vanlangendonck	4	7	4
4	(Czechoslovakia) S Birner (Australia) C A. Miller	6	6	6
(Australia) P Doohan (Australia) C Johnstone	3	6	6
2	(Australia) B Dyke (Australia) M Fancutt	6	1	7

Semifinals
1	(Sweden) A Järryd (Czechoslovakia) T Smid	6	6
3	(Sweden) J Gunnarsson (Denmark) M Mortensen	4	1
4	(Czechoslovakia) S Birner (Australia) C A. Miller	5	2
2	(Australia) B Dyke (Australia) M Fancutt	7	6

Final
1	(Sweden) A Järryd (Czechoslovakia) T Smid	6	5	7
2	(Australia) B Dyke (Australia) M Fancutt	4	7	6
