= 1984 Fischer-Grand Prix – Singles =

Singles
- 1984 Fischer-Grand Prix

Final
- Champion: (United States) Tim Wilkison
- Runner-up: (Czechoslovakia) Pavel Složil
- Score: 6–1, 6–1, 6–2

Details
- Draw: 32
- Seeds: 8

Events
Singles	Doubles
← 1983 ·	Vienna Open	· 1985 →

Brian Gottfried was the defending champion but did not compete that year.

Tim Wilkison won in the final 6–1, 6–1, 6–2 against Pavel Složil.

== Seeds ==
1. (United States) Vitas Gerulaitis (first round)
2. (Czechoslovakia) Libor Pimek (first round)
3. (France) Henri Leconte (semifinals)
4. (Switzerland) Heinz Günthardt (quarterfinals)
5. n/a
6. (Hungary) Balázs Taróczy (first round)
7. (Sweden) Jan Gunnarsson (quarterfinals)
8. (United States) Tim Wilkison (champion)

== Draw ==
=== Key ===
- Q = Qualifier
- WC = Wild card
- LL = Lucky loser
- Alt = Alternate
- SE = Special exempt
- PR = Protected ranking
- ITF = ITF entry
- JE = Junior exempt
- w/o = Walkover
- r = Retired
- d = Defaulted
- SR = Special ranking

=== Final ===
Semifinals
(United States) Mel Purcell	6	2	3
8	(United States) Tim Wilkison	3	6	6
3	(France) Henri Leconte	6	1	2
(Czechoslovakia) Pavel Složil	2	6	6

Final
8	(United States) Tim Wilkison	6	6	6
(Czechoslovakia) Pavel Složil	1	1	2

=== Section 1 ===
First round
1	(United States) V Gerulaitis	4	6	2
Q	(Austria) P Feigl	6	3	6
(Brazil) C Motta	4	6	0
(United States) M Purcell	6	1	6
(West Germany) R Gehring	6	4	1
(United States) J Brown	3	6	6
Q	(West Germany) B Becker	6	6	6
LL	(Czechoslovakia) K Nováček	4	7	1
4	(Switzerland) H Günthardt	6	6
(Israel) S Perkiss	4	2
(Chile) H Gildemeister	2	7	6
(South Africa) E Edwards	6	5	2
(United States) T Nelson	5	6	7
(Italy) C Panatta	7	4	6
(South Africa) D Visser	2	1
8	(United States) T Wilkison	6	6

Second round
Q	(Austria) P Feigl	1	5
(United States) M Purcell	6	7
(United States) J Brown	6	6
Q	(West Germany) B Becker	2	3
4	(Switzerland) H Günthardt	6	6
(Chile) H Gildemeister	3	2
(United States) T Nelson	2	2
8	(United States) T Wilkison	6	6

Quarterfinals
(United States) M Purcell	6	6
(United States) J Brown	1	2
4	(Switzerland) H Günthardt	4	6
8	(United States) T Wilkison	6	7

Semifinals
(United States) M Purcell	6	2	3
8	(United States) T Wilkison	3	6	6

=== Section 2 ===
First round
6	(Hungary) B Taróczy	2	4
(Poland) W Fibak	6	6
(Sweden) S Simonsson	6	6	4
Q	(Switzerland) J Hlasek	7	2	6
(Israel) S Glickstein	2	2
(West Germany) M Westphal	6	6
Q	(Italy) S Colombo	6	6	4
3	(France) H Leconte	7	1	6
7	(Sweden) J Gunnarsson	3	6	6
(Sweden) T Högstedt	6	3	2
(Italy) G Ocleppo	7	1	2
(Socialist Federal Republic of Yugoslavia) M Ostoja	6	6	6
(United States) M Doyle	4	0
(Austria) T Muster	6	6
(Czechoslovakia) P Složil	7	6
2	(Czechoslovakia) L Pimek	6	0

Second round
(Poland) W Fibak	6	6
Q	(Switzerland) J Hlasek	1	3
(West Germany) M Westphal	7	1	5
3	(France) H Leconte	6	6	7
7	(Sweden) J Gunnarsson	7	6
(Socialist Federal Republic of Yugoslavia) M Ostoja	5	4
(Austria) T Muster	4	2
(Czechoslovakia) P Složil	6	6

Quarterfinals
(Poland) W Fibak	2	6	4
3	(France) H Leconte	6	4	6
7	(Sweden) J Gunnarsson	6	3	4
(Czechoslovakia) P Složil	1	6	6

Semifinals
3	(France) H Leconte	6	1	2
(Czechoslovakia) P Složil	2	6	6
