= 1984 Fischer-Grand Prix – Doubles =

Doubles
- 1984 Fischer-Grand Prix

Final
- Champions: (Poland) Wojciech Fibak (United States) Sandy Mayer
- Runners-up: (Switzerland) Heinz Günthardt (Hungary) Balázs Taróczy
- Score: 6–4, 6–4

Details
- Draw: 16
- Seeds: 4

Events
Singles	Doubles
← 1983 ·	Vienna Open	· 1985 →

Mel Purcell and Stan Smith were the defending champions but lost in the quarterfinals to Wojciech Fibak and Sandy Mayer.

Fibak and Mayer won in the final 6–4, 6–4 against Heinz Günthardt and Balázs Taróczy.

== Seeds ==
1. (Switzerland) Heinz Günthardt / (Hungary) Balázs Taróczy (final)
2. (France) Henri Leconte / (Czechoslovakia) Pavel Složil (semifinals)
3. (Poland) Wojciech Fibak / (United States) Sandy Mayer (champions)
4. (Sweden) Jan Gunnarsson / (Denmark) Michael Mortensen (first round)

== Draw ==
=== Key ===
- Q = Qualifier
- WC = Wild card
- LL = Lucky loser
- Alt = Alternate
- SE = Special exempt
- PR = Protected ranking
- ITF = ITF entry
- JE = Junior exempt
- w/o = Walkover
- r = Retired
- d = Defaulted
- SR = Special ranking

First round
1	(Switzerland) H Günthardt (Hungary) B Taróczy	6	7
(Italy) G Ocleppo (Italy) C Panatta	0	5
(Italy) S Colombo (Socialist Federal Republic of Yugoslavia) M Ostoja	6	6
(United States) M Flur (United States) R Meyer	4	4
4	(Sweden) J Gunnarsson (Denmark) M Mortensen	4	7	4
(Czechoslovakia) L Pimek (United States) T Wilkison	6	5	6
(Austria) P Feigl (United States) V Gerulaitis	7	5	2
(Chile) H Gildemeister (Brazil) C Motta	5	7	6
(United States) M Purcell (United States) S Smith	2	6	7
(Brazil) A Hocevar (Brazil) M Hocevar	6	2	5
(Czechoslovakia) S Birner (Brazil) J Soares	5	2
3	(Poland) W Fibak (United States) S Mayer	7	6
(Israel) S Glickstein (Israel) S Perkiss	3	1
(South Africa) E Edwards (South Africa) D Visser	6	6
(Switzerland) M Günthardt (Switzerland) J Hlasek	4	4
2	(France) H Leconte (Czechoslovakia) P Složil	6	6

Quarterfinals
1	(Switzerland) H Günthardt (Hungary) B Taróczy	4	6	6
(Italy) S Colombo (Socialist Federal Republic of Yugoslavia) M Ostoja	6	4	1
(Czechoslovakia) L Pimek (United States) T Wilkison	3	3
(Chile) H Gildemeister (Brazil) C Motta	6	6
(United States) M Purcell (United States) S Smith	4	5
3	(Poland) W Fibak (United States) S Mayer	6	7
(South Africa) E Edwards (South Africa) D Visser	6	2
2	(France) H Leconte (Czechoslovakia) P Složil	7	6

Semifinals
1	(Switzerland) H Günthardt (Hungary) B Taróczy	2	7	7
(Chile) H Gildemeister (Brazil) C Motta	6	6	5
3	(Poland) W Fibak (United States) S Mayer	4	6	7
2	(France) H Leconte (Czechoslovakia) P Složil	6	3	5

Final
1	(Switzerland) H Günthardt (Hungary) B Taróczy	4	4
3	(Poland) W Fibak (United States) S Mayer	6	6
