= 1984 Buckeye Tennis Classic – Doubles =

Doubles
- 1984 Buckeye Tennis Classic

Final
- Champions: (United States) Sandy Mayer (United States) Stan Smith
- Runners-up: (United States) Bud Cox (United States) Terry Moor
- Score: 6–4, 6–7, 7–5

Details
- Draw: 16
- Seeds: 4

Events
Singles	Doubles
- Columbus Open

Scott Davis and Brian Teacher were the defending champions, but competed this year with different partners. Davis teamed up with Ben Testerman and lost in the semifinals to Bud Cox and Terry Moor, while Teacher teamed up with Mike Bauer and lost in the first round to Dan Cassidy and Jeff Klaparda.

Sandy Mayer and Stan Smith won the title by defeating Bud Cox and Terry Moor 6–4, 6–7, 7–5 in the final.

== Seeds ==
1. (United States) Tim Gullikson / (United States) Tom Gullikson (first round)
2. (United States) Mike Bauer / (United States) Brian Teacher (first round)
3. (Australia) John Alexander / (Czechoslovakia) Libor Pimek (first round)
4. (United States) Sandy Mayer / (United States) Stan Smith (champions)

== Draw ==
Key

- Q = Qualifier
- WC = Wild card
- LL = Lucky loser
- Alt = Alternate
- ITF = ITF entry
- PR = Protected ranking
- SR = Special ranking
- SE = Special exempt
- JE = Junior exempt
- JR = Junior Accelerator Programme entrant
- CO = College Accelerator Programme entrant
- NG = Next Gen Accelerator Program entrant
- w/o = Walkover
- r = Retired
- d = Defaulted

=== Draw ===
First round
1	(United States) Ti Gullikson (United States) To Gullikson	3	4
(United States) P Annacone (United States) S Giammalva Jr.	6	6
(United States) B Gottfried (United States) H Pfister	6	6
(United States) E Iskersky (United States) E Van't Hof	3	4
4	(United States) S Mayer (United States) S Smith	6	3	6
(United States) B Gilbert (United States) C Hooper	2	6	3
(India) A Amritraj (India) V Amritraj	6	6
(United States) M Mitchell (United States) R Van't Hof	3	4
(United States) J Gurfein (United States) R Nixon	4	4
(United States) S Davis (United States) B Testerman	6	6
(Denmark) M Mortensen (South Africa) D Visser	2	6	7
3	(Australia) J Alexander (Czechoslovakia) L Pimek	6	3	5
(United States) E Sherbeck (New Zealand) R Simpson	4	6	3
(United States) B Cox (United States) T Moor	6	3	6
(United States) D Cassidy (United States) J Klaparda	5	7	6
2	(United States) M Bauer (United States) B Teacher	7	6	2

Quarterfinals
(United States) P Annacone (United States) S Giammalva Jr.	2	3
(United States) B Gottfried (United States) H Pfister	6	6
4	(United States) S Mayer (United States) S Smith	6	6
(India) A Amritraj (India) V Amritraj	3	3
(United States) S Davis (United States) B Testerman	6	6
(Denmark) M Mortensen (South Africa) D Visser	0	4
(United States) B Cox (United States) T Moor	6	6	6
(United States) D Cassidy (United States) J Klaparda	7	1	2

Semifinals
(United States) B Gottfried (United States) H Pfister	3	3
4	(United States) S Mayer (United States) S Smith	6	6
(United States) S Davis (United States) B Testerman	3	6
(United States) B Cox (United States) T Moor	6	7

Final
4	(United States) S Mayer (United States) S Smith	6	6	7
(United States) B Cox (United States) T Moor	4	7	5
