= 1984 Mercedes Cup – Singles =

Singles
- 1984 Mercedes Cup

Final
- Champion: (France) Henri Leconte
- Runner-up: (United States) Gene Mayer
- Score: 7–6^{(11–9)}, 6–0, 1–6, 6–1

Details
- Draw: 32 (3WC/4Q/1LL/1SE)
- Seeds: 8

Events
Singles	Doubles
- Mercedes Cup

José Higueras was the defending champion, but lost in the quarterfinals to Tomas Smid.

Seventh-seeded Henri Leconte won the title by defeating Gene Mayer 7–6^{(11–9)}, 6–0, 1–6, 6–1 in the final.

== Seeds ==
1. (United States) Eliot Teltscher (semifinals)
2. (Czechoslovakia) Tomáš Šmíd (semifinals)
3. (South Africa) Kevin Curren (second round)
4. (United States) Scott Davis (first round)
5. (United States) Gene Mayer (final)
6. (Spain) José Higueras (quarterfinals)
7. (France) Henri Leconte (champion)
8. (United States) Brian Teacher (quarterfinals)

== Draw ==
Key

- Q = Qualifier
- WC = Wild card
- LL = Lucky loser
- Alt = Alternate
- ITF = ITF entry
- PR = Protected ranking
- SR = Special ranking
- SE = Special exempt
- JE = Junior exempt
- JR = Junior Accelerator Programme entrant
- CO = College Accelerator Programme entrant
- NG = Next Gen Accelerator Program entrant
- w/o = Walkover
- r = Retired
- d = Defaulted

=== Finals ===
Semifinals
1	(United States) Eliot Teltscher	3	3
5	(United States) Gene Mayer	6	6
7	(France) Henri Leconte	6	6
2	(Czechoslovakia) Tomáš Šmíd	2	1

Final
5	(United States) Gene Mayer	6^{9}	0	6	1
7	(France) Henri Leconte	7^{11}	6	1	6

=== Top half ===
First round
1	(United States) E Teltscher	6	6
WC	(West Germany) H Schwaier	2	3
(United States) F Buehning	3	4
(United States) B Gilbert	6	6
LL	(United States) B Walts	6	1
(United States) L Bourne	7	6
(Republic of Ireland) M Doyle	2	6	6
8	(United States) B Teacher	6	4	7
4	(United States) S Davis	4	3
(Hungary) Z Kuhárszky	6	6
(West Germany) A Maurer	2	7	7
(United States) T Gullikson	6	5	6
Q	(Argentina) A Ganzábal	7	4	4
(United States) M Davis	5	6	6
WC	(West Germany) D Keretić	6	4	3
5	(United States) G Mayer	3	6	6

Second round
1	(United States) E Teltscher	6	1	6
(United States) B Gilbert	3	6	3
(United States) L Bourne	7	2	1
8	(United States) B Teacher	6	6	6
(Hungary) Z Kuhárszky	7	6
(West Germany) A Maurer	6	4
(United States) M Davis	5	6
5	(United States) G Mayer	7	7

Quarterfinals
1	(United States) E Teltscher	7	6
8	(United States) B Teacher	5	2
(Hungary) Z Kuhárszky	4	3
5	(United States) G Mayer	6	6

Semifinals
1	(United States) E Teltscher	3	3
5	(United States) G Mayer	6	6

=== Bottom half ===
First round
7	(France) H Leconte	6	6
WC	(Sweden) B Borg	3	1
Q	(West Germany) Rüdiger Benz	3	6
(Brazil) G Barbosa	6	7
(United States) S Mayer	6	2
(New Zealand) C Lewis	7	6
(United States) S Denton	4	2
3	(South Africa) K Curren	6	6
6	(Spain) J Higueras	6	7
Q	(Chile) Á Fillol	4	6
(Poland) W Fibak	3	1
SE	(Spain) S Casal	6	6
(United States) M Bauer	0	0
Q	(West Germany) P Elter	6	6
(United Kingdom) C Dowdeswell	1	4
2	(Czechoslovakia) T Šmíd	6	6

Second round
7	(France) H Leconte	6	6
(Brazil) G Barbosa	1	2
(New Zealand) C Lewis	4	6	6
3	(South Africa) K Curren	6	3	4
6	(Spain) J Higueras	6	1	7
SE	(Spain) S Casal	2	6	6
Q	(West Germany) P Elter	2	2
2	(Czechoslovakia) T Šmíd	6	6

Quarterfinals
7	(France) H Leconte	7	6
(New Zealand) C Lewis	5	2
6	(Spain) J Higueras	6	3	3
2	(Czechoslovakia) T Šmíd	2	6	6

Semifinals
7	(France) H Leconte	6	6
2	(Czechoslovakia) T Šmíd	2	1
