= 1984 Mercedes Cup – Doubles =

Doubles
- 1984 Mercedes Cup

Final
- Champions: (United States) Sandy Mayer (West Germany) Andreas Maurer
- Runners-up: (United States) Fritz Buehning (United States) Ferdi Taygan
- Score: 7–6, 6–4

Details
- Draw: 16
- Seeds: 4

Events
Singles	Doubles
- Mercedes Cup

Mike Bauer and Anand Amritraj were the defending champions, but competed this year with different partners. Bauer teamed up with Butch Walts and lost in the first round to Fritz Buehning and Ferdi Taygan, while Amritraj teamed up with Michael Fancutt and were eliminated in the semifinals, also to Buehning and Taygan.

Sandy Mayer and Andreas Maurer won the title by defeating Buehning and Taygan 7–6, 6–4 in the final.

== Seeds ==
1. (Czechoslovakia) Tomáš Šmíd / (United States) Sherwood Stewart (first round)
2. (United States) Fritz Buehning / (United States) Ferdi Taygan (final)
3. (United States) Kevin Curren / (United States) Steve Denton (first round)
4. (United States) Victor Amaya / (United States) Tim Gullikson (first round)

== Draw ==
Key

- Q = Qualifier
- WC = Wild card
- LL = Lucky loser
- Alt = Alternate
- ITF = ITF entry
- PR = Protected ranking
- SR = Special ranking
- SE = Special exempt
- JE = Junior exempt
- JR = Junior Accelerator Programme entrant
- CO = College Accelerator Programme entrant
- NG = Next Gen Accelerator Program entrant
- w/o = Walkover
- r = Retired
- d = Defaulted

=== Draw ===
First round
1	(Czechoslovakia) T Šmíd (United States) S Stewart	3	6
WC	(United States) S Mayer (West Germany) A Maurer	7	7
(United States) E Fromm (United States) E Teltscher	6	6
(United States) L Bourne (Australia) B Dyke	3	1
3	(South Africa) K Curren (United States) S Denton	3	4
(New Zealand) C Lewis (Australia) K Warwick	6	6
(West Germany) P Elter (United States) D Gitlin	6	6	2
(United States) S Meister (United States) B Teacher	7	1	6
(United States) M Davis (United States) C Dunk	6	6
(Czechoslovakia) S Birner (Australia) CA Miller	3	4
(India) A Amritraj (Australia) M Fancutt	6	7
4	(United States) V Amaya (United States) T Gullikson	3	6
(United States) A Kohlberg (United States) R Meyer	6	6
(United Kingdom) C Dowdeswell (Poland) W Fibak	1	3
(United States) M Bauer (United States) B Walts	2	6
2	(United States) F Buehning (United States) F Taygan	6	7

Quarterfinals
WC	(United States) S Mayer (West Germany) A Maurer	6	6	6
(United States) E Fromm (United States) E Teltscher	7	2	3
(New Zealand) C Lewis (Australia) K Warwick	2	3
(United States) S Meister (United States) B Teacher	6	6
(United States) M Davis (United States) C Dunk	2	4
(India) A Amritraj (Australia) M Fancutt	6	6
(United States) A Kohlberg (United States) R Meyer	7	3	6
2	(United States) F Buehning (United States) F Taygan	6	6	7

Semifinals
WC	(United States) S Mayer (West Germany) A Maurer	6	7	6
(United States) S Meister (United States) B Teacher	7	6	4
(India) A Amritraj (Australia) M Fancutt	1	3
2	(United States) F Buehning (United States) F Taygan	6	6

Final
WC	(United States) S Mayer (West Germany) A Maurer	7	6
2	(United States) F Buehning (United States) F Taygan	6	4
