= 1984 U.S. Pro Indoor – Doubles =

Doubles
- 1984 U.S. Pro Indoor

Final
- Champions: (United States) Peter Fleming; (United States) John McEnroe
- Runners-up: (France) Henri Leconte; (France) Yannick Noah
- Score: 6–2, 6–3

Details
- Draw: 24
- Seeds: 8

Events
Singles	Doubles
- U.S. Pro Indoor

Kevin Curren and Steve Denton were the defending champions, but did not participate this year.

Peter Fleming and John McEnroe won the title, defeating Henri Leconte and Yannick Noah 6–2, 6–3 in the final.

== Seeds ==
All seeds receive a bye into the second round.

1. (United States) Peter Fleming / (United States) John McEnroe (champions)
2. (United States) Tim Gullikson / (United States) Tom Gullikson (second round)
3. N/A
4. (Switzerland) Heinz Günthardt / (Czechoslovakia) Tomáš Šmíd (quarterfinals)
5. (United States) Fritz Buehning / (United States) Ferdi Taygan (semifinals)
6. (United States) Victor Amaya / (United States) Brian Gottfried (quarterfinals)
7. (United States) Mike Bauer / (United States) Scott Davis (second round)
8. (Paraguay) Francisco González / (Paraguay) Víctor Pecci (second round)

== Draw ==
Key

- Q = Qualifier
- WC = Wild card
- LL = Lucky loser
- Alt = Alternate
- ITF = ITF entry
- PR = Protected ranking
- SR = Special ranking
- SE = Special exempt
- JE = Junior exempt
- JR = Junior Accelerator Programme entrant
- CO = College Accelerator Programme entrant
- NG = Next Gen Accelerator Program entrant
- w/o = Walkover
- r = Retired
- d = Defaulted

=== Finals ===
Semifinals

Final

1
- (United States) Peter Fleming
- (United States) John McEnroe
6
6

- (United States) Peter Rennert
- (United States) Butch Walts
2
4

1
- (United States) Peter Fleming
- (United States) John McEnroe
6
6

- (France) Henri Leconte
- (France) Yannick Noah
2
3

5
- (United States) Fritz Buehning
- (United States) Ferdi Taygan
7
4
4

- (France) Henri Leconte
- (France) Yannick Noah
6
6
6

=== Top half ===
First round

Second round

Quarterfinals

Semifinals

1
- (United States) P Fleming
- (United States) J McEnroe
6
6

- (Sweden) S Edberg
- (Sweden) S Simonsson
2
7
6

- (Sweden) S Edberg
- (Sweden) S Simonsson
0
1

- (United States) T Delatte
- (South Africa) J Kriek
6
5
2

1
- (United States) P Fleming
- (United States) J McEnroe
7
6

- (United Kingdom) J Lloyd
- (United States) D Stockton
6
5
6

6
- (United States) V Amaya
- (United States) B Gottfried
6
4

- (United States) E Fromm
- (United States) E Teltscher
2
7
3

- (United Kingdom) J Lloyd
- (United States) D Stockton
6
3

6
- (United States) V Amaya
- (United States) B Gottfried
7
6

1
- (United States) P Fleming
- (United States) J McEnroe
6
6

- (United States) P Rennert
- (United States) B Walts
2
4

- (United States) A Andrews
- (United States) J Sadri
6
5

- (United States) G Donnelly
- (United States) R Seguso
6
6
7

- (United States) G Donnelly
- (United States) R Seguso
7
7

- (United States) D Dowlen
- (Nigeria) N Odizor
7
0
6

- (United States) G Donnelly
- (United States) R Seguso
3
4

- (United States) P Rennert
- (United States) B Walts
6
6

- (United States) P Rennert
- (United States) B Walts
6
6

- (United States) M Dickson
- (United States) B Manson
2
4

- (United States) P Rennert
- (United States) B Walts
6
6

8
- (Paraguay) F González
- (Paraguay) V Pecci
4
4

=== Bottom half ===
First round

Second round

Quarterfinals

Semifinals

5
- (United States) F Buehning
- (United States) F Taygan
6
4
6

- (United States) S Giammalva Jr.
- (United States) T Giammalva
6
6

- (United States) S Giammalva Jr.
- (United States) T Giammalva
3
6
1

- (Switzerland) M Günthardt
- (Hungary) Z Kuhárszky
4
2

5
- (United States) F Buehning
- (United States) F Taygan
6
7

- (United States) M Purcell
- (United States) R Van't Hof
6
7

4
- (Switzerland) H Günthardt
- (Czechoslovakia) T Šmíd
0
6

- (India) A Amritraj
- (United States) M Mitchell
1
5

- (United States) M Purcell
- (United States) R Van't Hof
0
1

4
- (Switzerland) H Günthardt
- (Czechoslovakia) T Šmíd
6
6

5
- (United States) F Buehning
- (United States) F Taygan
7
4
4

- (France) H Leconte
- (France) Y Noah
6
6
6

7
- (United States) M Bauer
- (United States) S Davis
4
6

- (France) H Leconte
- (France) Y Noah
6
7

- (France) H Leconte
- (France) Y Noah
6
7

- (United States) S Meister
- (France) G Moretton
4
6

- (France) H Leconte
- (France) Y Noah
7
7

- (Poland) W Fibak
- (Czechoslovakia) I Lendl
7
6

- (Poland) W Fibak
- (Czechoslovakia) I Lendl
6
5

- (Australia) D Graham
- (Australia) L Warder
5
4

- (Poland) W Fibak
- (Czechoslovakia) I Lendl
6
3
6

2
- (United States) Ti Gullikson
- (United States) To Gullikson
2
6
3
