= 1984 Transamerica Open – Singles =

Singles
- 1984 Transamerica Open

Final
- Champion: (United States) John McEnroe
- Runner-up: (United States) Brad Gilbert
- Score: 6–4, 6–4

Details
- Draw: 32 (3WC/4Q)
- Seeds: 8

Events
Singles	Doubles
- Pacific Coast Championships

Ivan Lendl was the defending champion, but did not compete this year due to Davis Cup obligations.

John McEnroe won the title by defeating Brad Gilbert 6–4, 6–4 in the final.

== Seeds ==
1. (United States) John McEnroe (champion)
2. (United States) Gene Mayer (first round)
3. (United States) Eliot Teltscher (semifinals)
4. (United States) Tim Mayotte (first round)
5. (United States) Scott Davis (first round)
6. (South Africa) Kevin Curren (quarterfinals)
7. (Australia) Paul McNamee (second round)
8. (United States) Brad Gilbert (final)

== Draw ==
Key

- Q = Qualifier
- WC = Wild card
- LL = Lucky loser
- Alt = Alternate
- ITF = ITF entry
- PR = Protected ranking
- SR = Special ranking
- SE = Special exempt
- JE = Junior exempt
- JR = Junior Accelerator Programme entrant
- CO = College Accelerator Programme entrant
- NG = Next Gen Accelerator Program entrant
- w/o = Walkover
- r = Retired
- d = Defaulted

=== Finals ===
Semifinals
1	(United States) John McEnroe	6	6
3	(United States) Eliot Teltscher	3	1
(United States) Terry Moor	6	3	4
8	(United States) Brad Gilbert	4	6	6

Final
1	(United States) John McEnroe	6	6
8	(United States) Brad Gilbert	4	4

=== Top half ===
First round
1	(United States) J McEnroe	6	6
(United States) T Wilkison	3	4
WC	(United States) D Goldie	3	4
(United States) J Sadri	6	6
(United Kingdom) J Lloyd	7	6
(India) V Amritraj	5	3
(United States) L Shiras	2	2
7	(Australia) P McNamee	6	6
3	(United States) E Teltscher	6	6
(Australia) J Fitzgerald	2	4
(United States) Ti Gullikson	2	3
Q	(United States) L Duncan	6	6
(United States) To Gullikson	6	7
WC	(United States) P McEnroe	4	6
(United States) M Dickson	4	4
6	(South Africa) K Curren	6	6

Second round
1	(United States) J McEnroe	6	7
(United States) J Sadri	2	6
(United Kingdom) J Lloyd	7	7
7	(Australia) P McNamee	6	5
3	(United States) E Teltscher	6	6
Q	(United States) L Duncan	0	3
(United States) To Gullikson	6	6	6
6	(South Africa) K Curren	3	7	7

Quarterfinals
1	(United States) J McEnroe	6	6
(United Kingdom) J Lloyd	3	1
3	(United States) E Teltscher	6	6
6	(South Africa) K Curren	0	3

Semifinals
1	(United States) J McEnroe	6	6
3	(United States) E Teltscher	3	1

=== Bottom half ===
First round
5	(United States) S Davis	3	4
(Sweden) T Högstedt	6	6
Q	(Republic of Ireland) M Doyle	6	6
Q	(United States) R Nixon	3	3
Q	(Canada) G Michibata	6	6	3
(United States) T Moor	7	3	6
(United States) M Bauer	6	1	6
4	(United States) T Mayotte	4	6	3
8	(United States) B Gilbert	6	6
(Australia) W Masur	3	4
(Poland) W Fibak	7	5	6
(India) R Krishnan	6	7	7
WC	(United States) P Rennert	3	3
(United States) B Scanlon	6	6
(United States) P Fleming	4	6	6
2	(United States) G Mayer	6	3	0

Second round
(Sweden) T Högstedt	7	4	7
Q	(Republic of Ireland) M Doyle	6	6	6
(United States) T Moor	6	6
(United States) M Bauer	4	3
8	(United States) B Gilbert	6	7
(India) R Krishnan	0	6
(United States) B Scanlon	3	6	6
(United States) P Fleming	6	3	4

Quarterfinals
(Sweden) T Högstedt	3	2
(United States) T Moor	6	6
8	(United States) B Gilbert	6	7
(United States) B Scanlon	0	6

Semifinals
(United States) T Moor	6	3	4
8	(United States) B Gilbert	4	6	6
