= 1984 ABN World Tennis Tournament – Singles =

Singles
- 1984 ABN World Tennis Tournament

Final
- Champion: No Winner
- Runner-up: (Czechoslovakia) Ivan Lendl & (United States) Jimmy Connors
- Score: 6–0, 1–0

Details
- Draw: 32
- Seeds: 8

Events
Singles	Doubles
- ABN World Tennis Tournament

Gene Mayer was the defending champion of the singles event at the ABN World Tennis Tournament, but lost in the quarterfinals to Jimmy Connors. The final between first-seeded Ivan Lendl and second-seeded Jimmy Connors was halted at 6–0, 1–0 because the Ahoy Arena had received an anonymous telephone bomb threat. The police evacuated the stands and searched the venue but no bomb was found. The match was not resumed and officially has no winner.

== Seeds ==
1. (Czechoslovakia) Ivan Lendl (Final)
2. (United States) Jimmy Connors (Final)
3. (South Africa) Kevin Curren (Quarterfinal)
4. (United States) Eliot Teltscher (Quarterfinal)
5. (United States) Johan Kriek (second round)
6. (United States) Gene Mayer (Quarterfinal)
7. (Czechoslovakia) Tomáš Šmíd (second round)
8. (Sweden) Anders Järryd (semifinal)

== Draw ==
=== Finals ===
Semifinals
1	(Czechoslovakia) Ivan Lendl	6	2	7
WC	(Sweden) Stefan Edberg	3	6	6
8	(Sweden) Anders Järryd	4	4
2	(United States) Jimmy Connors	6	6

Final
1	(Czechoslovakia) Ivan Lendl	6	1 *
2	(United States) Jimmy Connors	0	0

- * Final unfinished due to a bomb scare. Ivan Lendl and Jimmy Connors both received Runners-up finishes.

=== Upper half ===
First round
1	(Czechoslovakia) Ivan Lendl	6	6
Q	(Switzerland) Jakob Hlasek	0	4
(United States) Scott Davis	3	6	1
Q	(Socialist Federal Republic of Yugoslavia) Marko Ostoja	6	3	6
(United States) Tom Gullikson	2	5
(United States) Mel Purcell	6	7
(United States) Hank Pfister	2	0
7	(Czechoslovakia) Tomáš Šmíd	6	6
4	(United States) Eliot Teltscher	6	7
(United States) Vitas Gerulaitis	3	5
(Sweden) Joakim Nyström	6	6
(United States) Robert Van't Hof	1	3
WC	(Sweden) Stefan Edberg	6	6	6
(United States) Chip Hooper	7	1	4
(Poland) Wojtek Fibak	6	1	4
5	(United States) Johan Kriek	2	6	6

Second round
1	(Czechoslovakia) Ivan Lendl	7	6
Q	(Socialist Federal Republic of Yugoslavia) Marko Ostoja	5	1
(United States) Mel Purcell	6	6
7	(Czechoslovakia) Tomáš Šmíd	4	0
4	(United States) Eliot Teltscher	3	6	6
(Sweden) Joakim Nyström	6	0	3
WC	(Sweden) Stefan Edberg	6	6
5	(United States) Johan Kriek	3	3

Quarterfinals
1	(Czechoslovakia) Ivan Lendl	6	6
(United States) Mel Purcell	1	2
4	(United States) Eliot Teltscher	1	4
WC	(Sweden) Stefan Edberg	6	6

Semifinals
1	(Czechoslovakia) Ivan Lendl	6	2	7
WC	(Sweden) Stefan Edberg	3	6	6

=== Lower half ===
First round
8	(Sweden) Anders Järryd	6	6
(Australia) Mark Edmondson	3	3
(France) Christophe Roger-Vasselin	1	4
(Israel) Shlomo Glickstein	6	6
(United States) Brian Gottfried	7	6
(United States) Roscoe Tanner	5	2
(Belgium) Jan Vanlangendonck	3	4
3	(South Africa) Kevin Curren	6	6
6	(United States) Gene Mayer	6	6
Q	(Sweden) Magnus Tideman	1	1
(Australia) John Fitzgerald	6	2	6
(Netherlands) Michiel Schapers	0	6	1
(United States) Fritz Buehning	3	6	7
(Australia) Pat Cash	6	4	5
(United States) Brian Teacher	3	6
2	(United States) Jimmy Connors	6	7

Second round
8	(Sweden) Anders Järryd	7	6
(Israel) Shlomo Glickstein	6	2
(United States) Brian Gottfried	2	5
3	(South Africa) Kevin Curren	6	7
6	(United States) Gene Mayer	6	6
(Australia) John Fitzgerald	3	1
(United States) Fritz Buehning	2	1
2	(United States) Jimmy Connors	6	6

Quarterfinals
8	(Sweden) Anders Järryd	7	6
3	(South Africa) Kevin Curren	6	2
6	(United States) Gene Mayer	0	1
2	(United States) Jimmy Connors	6	6

Semifinals
8	(Sweden) Anders Järryd	4	4
2	(United States) Jimmy Connors	6	6
