= 1984 ABN World Tennis Tournament – Doubles =

Doubles
- 1984 ABN World Tennis Tournament

Final
- Champions: (South Africa) Kevin Curren (Poland) Wojciech Fibak
- Runners-up: (United States) Fritz Buehning (United States) Ferdi Taygan
- Score: 6–4, 6–4

Details
- Draw: 16
- Seeds: 4

Events
Singles	Doubles
- Rotterdam Open

Fritz Buehning and Tom Gullikson were the defending champions, but Gullikson did not compete this year.

Buehning teamed up with Ferdi Taygan and lost in the final to Kevin Curren and Wojciech Fibak. The score was 6–4, 6–4.

== Seeds ==
1. (Australia) Mark Edmondson / (United States) Sherwood Stewart (semifinals)
2. (Sweden) Anders Järryd / (Sweden) Hans Simonsson (first round)
3. (United States) Fritz Buehning / (United States) Ferdi Taygan (final)
4. (Czechoslovakia) Pavel Složil / (Czechoslovakia) Tomáš Šmíd (semifinals)

== Draw ==
Key

- Q = Qualifier
- WC = Wild card
- LL = Lucky loser
- Alt = Alternate
- ITF = ITF entry
- PR = Protected ranking
- SR = Special ranking
- SE = Special exempt
- JE = Junior exempt
- JR = Junior Accelerator Programme entrant
- CO = College Accelerator Programme entrant
- NG = Next Gen Accelerator Program entrant
- w/o = Walkover
- r = Retired
- d = Defaulted

=== Draw ===
First round
1	(Australia) M Edmondson (United States) S Stewart	7	6
(United States) T Delatte (United States) J Kriek	6	3
(United States) V Amaya (United Kingdom) J Lloyd	3	6	6
(United States) P Rennert (United States) R Seguso	6	3	4
3	(United States) F Buehning (United States) F Taygan	6	6
(United States) M Purcell (United States) R Van't Hof	2	2
(Australia) D Graham (Australia) L Warder	2	7	5
(United States) S Davis (United States) B Teacher	6	6	7
(Netherlands) M Schapers (Netherlands) H van Boeckel	5	6	6
(Sweden) J Nyström (Sweden) M Tideman	7	2	2
(Australia) P Cash (Australia) J Fitzgerald	6	2	2
4	(Czechoslovakia) P Složil (Czechoslovakia) T Šmíd	4	6	6
(South Africa) K Curren (Poland) W Fibak	3	6	6
(Israel) S Glickstein (United States) B Gottfried	6	4	2
(Australia) B Dyke (Australia) R Frawley	6	2	6
2	(Sweden) A Järryd (Sweden) H Simonsson	1	6	4

Quarterfinals
1	(Australia) M Edmondson (United States) S Stewart	6	7
(United States) V Amaya (United Kingdom) J Lloyd	3	6
3	(United States) F Buehning (United States) F Taygan	3	6	6
(United States) S Davis (United States) B Teacher	6	1	4
(Netherlands) M Schapers (Netherlands) H van Boeckel	3	1
4	(Czechoslovakia) P Složil (Czechoslovakia) T Šmíd	6	6
(South Africa) K Curren (Poland) W Fibak	7	7
(Australia) B Dyke (Australia) R Frawley	5	5

Semifinals
1	(Australia) M Edmondson (United States) S Stewart	2	6
3	(United States) F Buehning (United States) F Taygan	6	7
4	(Czechoslovakia) P Složil (Czechoslovakia) T Šmíd	1	6	6
(South Africa) K Curren (Poland) W Fibak	6	1	7

Final
3	(United States) F Buehning (United States) F Taygan	4	4
(South Africa) K Curren (Poland) W Fibak	6	6
