= 1984 Dutch Open – Singles =

Singles
- 1984 Dutch Open

Final
- Champion: (Sweden) Anders Järryd
- Runner-up: (Czechoslovakia) Tomáš Šmíd
- Score: 6–3, 6–3, 2–6, 6–2

Details
- Draw: 32
- Seeds: 8

Events
Singles	Doubles
- Dutch Open

Tomáš Šmíd was the defending champion, but lost in the final to Anders Järryd. The score was 6–3, 6–3, 2–6, 6–2.

== Seeds ==
1. (Sweden) Anders Järryd (champion)
2. (Czechoslovakia) Tomáš Šmíd (final)
3. (Sweden) Jan Gunnarsson (second round)
4. (Switzerland) Claudio Mezzadri (second round, withdrew)
5. (Belgium) Bernard Boileau (semifinals)
6. (Switzerland) Roland Stadler (first round)
7. (Netherlands) Michiel Schapers (first round, retired)
8. (Mexico) Francisco Maciel (second round)

== Draw ==
Key

- Q = Qualifier
- WC = Wild card
- LL = Lucky loser
- Alt = Alternate
- ITF = ITF entry
- PR = Protected ranking
- SR = Special ranking
- SE = Special exempt
- JE = Junior exempt
- JR = Junior Accelerator Programme entrant
- CO = College Accelerator Programme entrant
- NG = Next Gen Accelerator Program entrant
- w/o = Walkover
- r = Retired
- d = Defaulted

=== Finals ===
Semifinals
1	(Sweden) Anders Järryd	2	6	6
(Argentina) Carlos Castellan	6	1	4
5	(Belgium) Bernard Boileau	5	4
2	(Czechoslovakia) Tomáš Šmíd	7	6

Final
1	(Sweden) Anders Järryd	6	6	2	6
2	(Czechoslovakia) Tomáš Šmíd	3	3	6	2

=== Top half ===
First round
1	(Sweden) A Järryd	6	6
(West Germany) J Becka	1	1
(West Germany) H-D Beutel	4	1
(Spain) J Lopez-Maeso	6	6
(Australia) B Dyke	2	5
Q	(Peru) C di Laura	6	7
(West Germany) D Keretić	5	6	3
7	(Netherlands) M Schapers	7	4	5^{r}
4	(Switzerland) C Mezzadri	6	6
(France) G Goven	4	3
(France) P Kuchna	1	3
(Argentina) C Castellan	6	6
(Czechoslovakia) S Birner	6	6
Q	(France) T Pham	2	2
(Australia) P Doohan	6	7
6	(Switzerland) R Stadler	3	6

Second round
1	(Sweden) A Järryd	6	6
(Spain) J Lopez-Maeso	4	3
Q	(Peru) C di Laura	2	3
(West Germany) D Keretić	6	6
4	(Switzerland) C Mezzadri
(Argentina) C Castellan	w/o
(Czechoslovakia) S Birner	6	6
(Australia) P Doohan	3	3

Quarterfinals
1	(Sweden) A Järryd	6	6
(West Germany) D Keretić	1	3
(Argentina) C Castellan	6	6
(Czechoslovakia) S Birner	1	1

Semifinals
1	(Sweden) A Järryd	2	6	6
(Argentina) C Castellan	6	1	4

=== Bottom half ===
First round
5	(Belgium) B Boileau	6	6
(Spain) L Fargas	3	3
(United Kingdom) J Bates	3	6	3
Q	(South Africa) C Campbell	6	1	6
LL	(United Kingdom) J Smith	4	6	6
(Australia) C A. Miller	6	2	2
(Netherlands) M Oosting	7	2	2
3	(Sweden) J Gunnarsson	6	6	6
8	(Mexico) F Maciel	3	6	7
(Australia) C Johnstone	6	2	5
(Spain) R Vizcaíno	0	3
(Sweden) K Carlsson	6	6
(Netherlands) H van Boeckel	2	3
(Sweden) P Carlsson	6	6
Q	(Greece) G Kalovelonis	3	2
2	(Czechoslovakia) T Smid	6	6

Second round
5	(Belgium) B Boileau	6	2	7
Q	(South Africa) C Campbell	2	6	5
LL	(United Kingdom) J Smith	6	6
3	(Sweden) J Gunnarsson	1	4
8	(Mexico) F Maciel	3	4
(Sweden) K Carlsson	6	6
(Sweden) P Carlsson	1	3
2	(Czechoslovakia) T Smid	6	6

Quarterfinals
5	(Belgium) B Boileau	6	6
LL	(United Kingdom) J Smith	3	3
(Sweden) K Carlsson	6	4	1
2	(Czechoslovakia) T Smid	4	6	6

Semifinals
5	(Belgium) B Boileau	5	4
2	(Czechoslovakia) T Smid	7	6
