= 1984 U.S. Pro Indoor – Singles =

Singles
- 1984 U.S. Pro Indoor

Final
- Champion: (United States) John McEnroe
- Runner-up: (Czechoslovakia) Ivan Lendl
- Score: 6–3, 3–6, 6–3, 7–6

Details
- Draw: 48
- Seeds: 16

Events
| Singles | Doubles |
- U.S. Pro Indoor

John McEnroe was the defending champion.

McEnroe successfully defended his title, defeating Ivan Lendl, 6–3, 3–6, 6–3, 7–6 in the final.

== Seeds ==
1. (Czechoslovakia) Ivan Lendl (final)
2. (United States) John McEnroe (champion)
3. (France) Yannick Noah (semifinals)
4. (United States) Jimmy Arias (quarterfinals)
5. (United States) Bill Scanlon (second round)
6. (South Africa) ~~Kevin Curren~~ (withdrew)
7. (United States) Gene Mayer (second round)
8. (United States) Eliot Teltscher (quarterfinals)
9. (South Africa) Johan Kriek (third round)
10. (United States) Tim Mayotte (second round)
11. (Czechoslovakia) Tomáš Šmíd(quarterfinals)
12. (United States) Brian Gottfried (second round)
13. (Sweden) Henrik Sundström (second round)
14. (Switzerland) Heinz Günthardt (third round)
15. (United States) Scott Davis (third round)
16. (France) Henri Leconte (third round)

== Draw ==
Key

- Q = Qualifier
- WC = Wild card
- LL = Lucky loser
- Alt = Alternate
- ITF = ITF entry
- PR = Protected ranking
- SR = Special ranking
- SE = Special exempt
- JE = Junior exempt
- JR = Junior Accelerator Programme entrant
- CO = College Accelerator Programme entrant
- NG = Next Gen Accelerator Program entrant
- w/o = Walkover
- r = Retired
- d = Defaulted

=== Finals ===
Semifinals
1 | (Czechoslovakia) Ivan Lendl | 6 | 6
3 | (France) Yannick Noah | 3 | 4
(Poland) Wojtek Fibak | 2 | 6
2 | (United States) John McEnroe | 6 | 7

Final
1 | (Czechoslovakia) Ivan Lendl | 3 | 6 | 3 | 6
2 | (United States) John McEnroe | 6 | 3 | 6 | 7

=== Top half ===
==== Section 1 ====
First round
(Romania) F Segărceanu | 4 | 2
(Sweden) S Simonsson | 6 | 6
(United States) Ti Gullikson | 6 | 6
(United Kingdom) C Dowdeswell | 4 | 2
(Paraguay) V Pecci | 3 | 3
Q | (United States) V Van Patten | 6 | 6
Q | (United Kingdom) J Lloyd | 6 | 7 | 2
(United States) B Gilbert | 7 | 5 | 6

Second round
1 | (Czechoslovakia) I Lendl | 6 | 6
(Sweden) S Simonsson | 3 | 0
(United States) Ti Gullikson | 6 | 6
12 | (United States) B Gottfried | 0 | 3
9 | (South Africa) J Kriek | 6 | 6
Q | (United States) V Van Patten | 4 | 4
(United States) B Gilbert | 6 | 6
5 | (United States) B Scanlon | 4 | 2

Third round
1 | (Czechoslovakia) I Lendl | 6 | 6
(United States) Ti Gullikson | 1 | 2
9 | (South Africa) J Kriek | 6 | 2
(United States) B Gilbert | 7 | 6

Quarterfinals
1 | (Czechoslovakia) I Lendl | 3 | 6 | 6
(United States) B Gilbert | 6 | 2 | 1

==== Section 2 ====
First round
(United States) M Bauer | 4 | 1
(United States) H Solomon | 6 | 6
(Nigeria) N Odizor | 6 | 6
Q | (United States) Joe Heldmann | 4 | 2
(Sweden) S Edberg | 7 | 1 | 3
(United States) E Korita | 6 | 6 | 6
(Canada) G Michibata | 6 | 6
(United States) F Buehning | 3 | 3

Second round
3 | (France) Y Noah | 7 | 6
(United States) H Solomon | 6 | 1
(Nigeria) N Odizor | 1 | 1
16 | (France) H Leconte | 6 | 6
13 | (Sweden) H Sundström | 3 | 1
(United States) E Korita | 6 | 6
(Canada) G Michibata | 4 | 1
8 | (United States) E Teltscher | 6 | 6

Third round
3 | (France) Y Noah | 7 | 6
16 | (France) H Leconte | 6 | 3
(United States) E Korita | 6 | 1
8 | (United States) E Teltscher | 7 | 6

Quarterfinals
3 | (France) Y Noah | 6 | 1 | 6
8 | (United States) E Teltscher | 3 | 6 | 2

=== Bottom half ===
==== Section 3 ====
First round
Q | (United States) S Meister | 5 | 1
Q | (United States) B Testerman | 7 | 6
(Poland) W Fibak | 6 | 6
(United States) To Gullikson | 2 | 1
(United States) R Harmon | 1 | 5
(Czechoslovakia) L Pimek | 6 | 7
(United States) E Fromm | 2 | 7 | 7
(United States) M Dickson | 6 | 6 | 5

Second round
7 | (United States) G Mayer | 7 | 4 | 3
Q | (United States) B Testerman | 6 | 6 | 6
(Poland) W Fibak | 3 | 6 | 7
10 | (United States) T Mayotte | 6 | 3 | 5
14 | (Switzerland) H Günthardt | 6 | 6
(Czechoslovakia) L Pimek | 3 | 3
(United States) E Fromm | 4 | 6
4 | (United States) J Arias | 6 | 7

Third round
Q | (United States) B Testerman | 6 | 6 | 4
(Poland) W Fibak | 7 | 3 | 6
14 | (Switzerland) H Günthardt | 7 | 2 | 6
4 | (United States) J Arias | 5 | 6 | 7

Quarterfinals
(Poland) W Fibak | 6 | 7
4 | (United States) J Arias | 3 | 6

==== Section 4 ====
First round
(United States) R Van't Hof | 5 | 6 | 6
(France) C Roger-Vasselin | 7 | 0 | 3
(United States) A Krickstein | 7 | 7
Q | (United States) D Pate | 6 | 5
(United States) S Giammalava Jr. | 6 | 6
(United States) S Denton | 2 | 2
(United States) J Brown | 4 | 7 | 4
(United States) P Fleming | 6 | 5 | 6

Second round
LL | (United States) B Walts | 7 | 6
(United States) R Van't Hof | 6 | 1
(United States) A Krickstein | 5 | 0
11 | (Czechoslovakia) T Šmid | 7 | 6
15 | (United States) S Davis | 7 | 2 | 6
(United States) S Giammalava Jr. | 5 | 6 | 4
(United States) P Fleming | 4 | 2
2 | (United States) J McEnroe | 6 | 6

Third round
LL | (United States) B Walts | 6 | 3 | 2
11 | (Czechoslovakia) T Šmid | 4 | 6 | 6
15 | (United States) S Davis | 1 | 2
2 | (United States) J McEnroe | 6 | 6

Quarterfinals
11 | (Czechoslovakia) T Šmid | 0 | 3
2 | (United States) J McEnroe | 6 | 6

== See also ==
- Lendl–McEnroe rivalry
