= 1984 Transamerica Open – Doubles =

Doubles
- 1984 Transamerica Open

Final
- Champions: (United States) Peter Fleming (United States) John McEnroe
- Runners-up: (United States) Mike De Palmer (United States) Sammy Giammalva Jr.
- Score: 6–3, 6–4

Details
- Draw: 16 (1WC)
- Seeds: 4

Events
Singles	Doubles
- Pacific Coast Championships

Peter Fleming and John McEnroe successfully defended their title, by defeating Mike De Palmer and Sammy Giammalva Jr. 6–3, 6–4 in the final.

== Seeds ==
1. (United States) Peter Fleming / (United States) John McEnroe (champions)
2. (Australia) Mark Edmondson / (United States) Sherwood Stewart (first round)
3. (South Africa) Kevin Curren / (United States) Steve Denton (first round)
4. (United States) Fritz Buehning / (United States) Ferdi Taygan (semifinals)

== Draw ==
Key

- Q = Qualifier
- WC = Wild card
- LL = Lucky loser
- Alt = Alternate
- ITF = ITF entry
- PR = Protected ranking
- SR = Special ranking
- SE = Special exempt
- JE = Junior exempt
- JR = Junior Accelerator Programme entrant
- CO = College Accelerator Programme entrant
- NG = Next Gen Accelerator Program entrant
- w/o = Walkover
- r = Retired
- d = Defaulted

=== Draw ===
First round
1	(United States) P Fleming (United States) J McEnroe	7	6
(United States) M Davis (United States) C Dunk	5	2
(United States) Ti Gullikson (United States) To Gullikson	w/o
(United States) K Flach (United States) R Seguso
4	(United States) F Buehning (United States) F Taygan	6	7
(Australia) D Graham (South Africa) D Visser	2	5
WC	(United States) S McCain (United States) R Nixon	4	4
(Paraguay) F González (United States) M Mitchell	6	6
(United States) M De Palmer (United States) S Giammalva Jr.	4	7	6
(United States) P Annacone (United States) E Korita	6	6	4
(United States) G Donnelly (United States) B Walts	6	7
3	(South Africa) K Curren (United States) S Denton	4	5
(United States) B Manson (United States) S Meister	6	4	6
(Australia) B Drewett (Australia) W Masur	3	6	3
(Poland) W Fibak (United States) S Mayer	6	4	6
2	(Australia) M Edmondson (United States) S Stewart	3	6	3

Quarterfinals
1	(United States) P Fleming (United States) J McEnroe	7	6
(United States) Ti Gullikson (United States) To Gullikson	5	2
4	(United States) F Buehning (United States) F Taygan	6	6
(Paraguay) F González (United States) M Mitchell	4	4
(United States) M De Palmer (United States) S Giammalva Jr.	4	7	6
(United States) G Donnelly (United States) B Walts	6	6	4
(United States) B Manson (United States) S Meister	6	4	6
(Poland) W Fibak (United States) S Mayer	3	6	3

Semifinals
1	(United States) P Fleming (United States) J McEnroe	7	6
4	(United States) F Buehning (United States) F Taygan	5	3
(United States) M De Palmer (United States) S Giammalva Jr.	6	6	6
(United States) B Manson (United States) S Meister	7	3	2

Final
1	(United States) P Fleming (United States) J McEnroe	6	6
(United States) M De Palmer (United States) S Giammalva Jr.	3	4
