= 1984 Buckeye Tennis Classic – Singles =

Singles
- 1984 Buckeye Tennis Classic

Final
- Champion: (United States) Brad Gilbert
- Runner-up: (United States) Hank Pfister
- Score: 6–3, 2–6, 6–3

Details
- Draw: 32 (3WC/3Q/2LL)
- Seeds: 8

Events
Singles	Doubles
- Columbus Open

Brian Teacher was the defending champion, but lost in the quarterfinals to lucky loser Hank Pfister.

Brad Gilbert won the title by defeating Pfister 6–3, 2–6, 6–3 in the final.

== Seeds ==
1. (United States) Scott Davis (second round)
2. (United States) Brian Teacher (quarterfinals)
3. (United States) Brad Gilbert (champion)
4. (Czechoslovakia) Libor Pimek (semifinals)
5. (United States) Tim Gullikson (second round)
6. (United States) Mike Bauer (first round)
7. (India) Ramesh Krishnan (first round)
8. (United States) Tom Gullikson (first round)

== Draw ==
Key

- Q = Qualifier
- WC = Wild card
- LL = Lucky loser
- Alt = Alternate
- ITF = ITF entry
- PR = Protected ranking
- SR = Special ranking
- SE = Special exempt
- JE = Junior exempt
- JR = Junior Accelerator Programme entrant
- CO = College Accelerator Programme entrant
- NG = Next Gen Accelerator Program entrant
- w/o = Walkover
- r = Retired
- d = Defaulted

=== Finals ===
Semifinals
WC	(United States) Vincent Van Patten	4	4
3	(United States) Brad Gilbert	6	6
4	(Czechoslovakia) Libor Pimek	6	5	3
LL	(United States) Hank Pfister	2	7	6

Final
3	(United States) Brad Gilbert	6	2	6
LL	(United States) Hank Pfister	3	6	3

=== Top half ===
First round
1	(United States) S Davis	7	6
Q	(United States) J Gurfein	5	4
(Australia) J Alexander	1	2
WC	(United States) V Van Patten	6	6
(United States) B Gottfried	4	4
(United States) T Moor	6	6
(United States) R Tanner	7	2	1
5	(United States) Ti Gullikson	5	6	6
3	(United States) B Gilbert	6	6
(United States) M Mitchell	4	1
(United States) S Mayer	6	1	6
(Czechoslovakia) M Mečíř	2	6	4
(United States) C Hooper	7	6
LL	(United States) R Nixon	6	4
(South Africa) D Visser	3	6	7
7	(India) R Krishnan	6	4	6

Second round
1	(United States) S Davis	2	0
WC	(United States) V Van Patten	6	6
(United States) T Moor	6	7	7
5	(United States) Ti Gullikson	7	6	5
3	(United States) B Gilbert	7	3	6
(United States) S Mayer	5	6	2
(United States) C Hooper	5	3
(South Africa) D Visser	7	6

Quarterfinals
WC	(United States) V Van Patten	7	6
(United States) T Moor	5	4
3	(United States) B Gilbert	3	6	7
(South Africa) D Visser	6	3	5

Semifinals
WC	(United States) V Van Patten	4	4
3	(United States) B Gilbert	6	6

=== Bottom half ===
First round
8	(United States) To Gullikson	3	2
(United States) S Giammalva Jr.	6	6
WC	(United States) R Brown	4	4
(United States) R Harmon	6	6
(United States) M Freeman	6	6
Q	(United States) J Levine	2	4
(United States) B Testerman	6	2
4	(Czechoslovakia) L Pimek	7	6
6	(United States) M Bauer	4	4
LL	(United States) H Pfister	6	6
WC	(India) V Amritraj	6	6
(New Zealand) R Simpson	4	2
(United States) J Klaparda	6	3
Q	(Denmark) M Mortensen	7	6
(United States) P Annacone	3	3
2	(United States) B Teacher	6	6

Second round
(United States) S Giammalva Jr.	6	7
(United States) R Harmon	2	5
(United States) M Freeman	3	2
4	(Czechoslovakia) L Pimek	6	6
LL	(United States) H Pfister	3	6	6
WC	(India) V Amritraj	6	4	2
Q	(Denmark) M Mortensen	4	6	6
2	(United States) B Teacher	6	3	7

Quarterfinals
(United States) S Giammalva Jr.	6	6	0^{r}
4	(Czechoslovakia) L Pimek	4	7	3
LL	(United States) H Pfister	5	6	6
2	(United States) B Teacher	7	3	4

Semifinals
4	(Czechoslovakia) L Pimek	6	5	3
LL	(United States) H Pfister	2	7	6
