= 1982 Transamerica Open – Singles =

Singles
- 1982 Transamerica Open

Final
- Champion: (United States) John McEnroe
- Runner-up: (United States) Jimmy Connors
- Score: 6–1, 6–3

Details
- Draw: 32 (4Q)
- Seeds: 8

Events
Singles	Doubles
← 1981 ·	Pacific Coast Championships	· 1983 →

Eliot Teltscher was the defending champion, but lost in the semifinals to John McEnroe.

McEnroe won the title by defeating Jimmy Connors 6–1, 6–3 in the final.

== Seeds ==
1. (United States) Jimmy Connors (final)
2. (United States) John McEnroe (champion)
3. (United States) Eliot Teltscher (semifinals)
4. (United States) Sandy Mayer (semifinals)
5. (United States) Johan Kriek (quarterfinals)
6. (United States) Brian Teacher (quarterfinals)
7. (United States) Chip Hooper (second round)
8. (United States) Mel Purcell (first round)

== Draw ==
=== Key ===
- Q = Qualifier
- WC = Wild card
- LL = Lucky loser
- Alt = Alternate
- SE = Special exempt
- PR = Protected ranking
- ITF = ITF entry
- JE = Junior exempt
- w/o = Walkover
- r = Retired
- d = Defaulted
- SR = Special ranking

=== Finals ===
Semifinals
1	(United States) Jimmy Connors	4	6	6
4	(United States) Sandy Mayer	6	2	1
3	(United States) Eliot Teltscher	3	4
2	(United States) John McEnroe	6	6

Final
1	(United States) Jimmy Connors	1	3
2	(United States) John McEnroe	6	6

=== Top half ===
First round
1	(United States) J Connors	7	6
(United States) Ti Gullikson	6	2
(Republic of Ireland) M Doyle	4	6	1
(United States) V Van Patten	6	4	6
(United States) M Davis	6	3	6
(United States) J Arias	3	6	7
(United States) E Fromm	3	6	4
7	(United States) C Hooper	6	4	6
4	(United States) S Mayer	6	6
(Brazil) J Soares	3	1
Q	(United States) G Holmes	5	3
(United States) J Borowiak	7	6
(United States) R Tanner	6	6	6
(United States) D Stockton	4	7	3
(United States) E Iskersky	5	6	2
6	(United States) B Teacher	7	4	6

Second round
1	(United States) J Connors	6	6
(United States) V Van Patten	2	1
(United States) J Arias	6	6	6
7	(United States) C Hooper	7	3	4
4	(United States) S Mayer	7	4	7
(United States) J Borowiak	5	6	6
(United States) R Tanner	3	5
6	(United States) B Teacher	6	7

Quarterfinals
1	(United States) J Connors	7	5	6
(United States) J Arias	5	7	2
4	(United States) S Mayer	6	6
6	(United States) B Teacher	3	3

Semifinals
1	(United States) J Connors	4	6	6
4	(United States) S Mayer	6	2	1

=== Bottom half ===
First round
8	(United States) M Purcell	2	3
(United States) T Mayotte	6	6
(United States) J Sadri	6	6
Q	(Australia) P Cash	3	4
(United States) M Cahill	6	6
(United States) P Rennert	4	4
(United States) L Bourne	1	0
3	(United States) E Teltscher	6	6
5	(United States) J Kriek	6	6
(United States) S Davis	4	2
(United States) F Buehning	6	3	6
Q	(United States) B Gilbert	3	6	2
(United States) P DuPré	3	6	4
(United Kingdom) R Lewis	6	3	6
Q	(United States) M Strode	1	3
2	(United States) J McEnroe	6	6

Second round
(United States) T Mayotte	7	7
(United States) J Sadri	6	6
(United States) M Cahill	6	3	3
3	(United States) E Teltscher	3	6	6
5	(United States) J Kriek	5	7	6
(United States) F Buehning	7	6	1
(United Kingdom) R Lewis	1	1
2	(United States) J McEnroe	6	6

Quarterfinals
(United States) T Mayotte	4	7	2
3	(United States) E Teltscher	6	5	6
5	(United States) J Kriek	1	2
2	(United States) J McEnroe	6	6

Semifinals
3	(United States) E Teltscher	3	4
2	(United States) J McEnroe	6	6
