= 1985 Black & Decker Indoor Championships – Singles =

Singles
- 1985 Black & Decker Indoor Championships

Final
- Champion: (United States) Marty Davis
- Runner-up: (United States) Paul Annacone
- Score: 6–4, 6–4

Details
- Draw: 32 (1WC/4Q)
- Seeds: 8

Events
Singles	Doubles
← 1984 ·	Melbourne Indoor

Matt Mitchell the defending champion of the Melbourne Indoor title lost in the second round to Broderick Dyke. Dyke lost in the quarter finals to the eventual champion, Marty Davis, who beat Paul Annacone in the final, 6–4, 6–4

== Seeds ==
1. (United States) Paul Annacone (finalist)
2. (United States) Ben Testerman (Semi-finalist)
3. (United States) Matt Mitchell (second round)
4. (United States) Brian Teacher (second round)
5. (United States) Terry Moor (first round)
6. (United States) Marty Davis (champion)
7. (Australia) Kelly Evernden (first round)
8. (Nigeria) Nduka Odizor (second round)

== Draw ==
=== Key ===
- Q = Qualifier
- WC = Wild card
- LL = Lucky loser
- Alt = Alternate
- SE = Special exempt
- PR = Protected ranking
- ITF = ITF entry
- JE = Junior exempt
- w/o = Walkover
- r = Retired
- d = Defaulted
- SR = Special ranking

=== Finals ===
Semi-finals
1	(United States) Paul Annacone	6	6	6
Q	(South Africa) Christo van Rensburg	7	4	3
6	(United States) Marty Davis	6	6	6
2	(United States) Ben Testerman	4	7	4

Final
1	(United States) Paul Annacone	4	4
6	(United States) Marty Davis	6	6

=== Top half ===
Round 1
1	(United States) P Annacone	6	7
(United Kingdom) S Bale	3	5
(United States) T Cain	6	7
(United States) T Nelson	3	6
Q	(Australia) L Warder	3	6	4
(United States) M Freeman	6	4	6
(Australia) W Masur	6	6
5	(United States) T Moor	2	3
4	(United States) B Teacher	6	6
(Paraguay) F González	2	2
WC	(Australia) M Woodforde	7	6
(Australia) D Cahill	5	4
(Australia) S Youl	4	1
Q	(South Africa) C van Rensburg	6	6
(United States) G layendecker	6	6
8	(Nigeria) N Odizor	7	7

Round 2
1	(United States) P Annacone	6	6
(United States) T Cain	2	4
(United States) M Freeman	3	7	3
(Australia) W Masur	6	6	6
4	(United States) B Teacher	6	5	6
WC	(Australia) M Woodforde	4	7	7
Q	(South Africa) C van Rensburg	5	7	6
8	(Nigeria) N Odizor	7	5	4

Quarter-finals
1	(United States) P Annacone	4	6	7
(Australia) W Masur	6	3	6
WC	(Australia) M Woodforde	6	6	1
Q	(South Africa) C van Rensburg	3	7	6

Semi-final
1	(United States) P Annacone	6	6	6
Q	(South Africa) C van Rensburg	7	4	3

=== Bottom half ===
Round 1
6	(United States) M Davis	6	6	6
(United States) M Bauer	4	7	3
Q	(Australia) M Kratzmann	3	4
(Australia) B Drewett	6	6
(Sweden) T Högstedt	6	2	3
(Australia) B Dyke	0	6	6
(United States) B Dickinson	7	6	3
3	(United States) M Mitchell	6	7	6
7	(Australia) K Evernden	4	4
(Australia) C Miller	6	6
Q	(Australia) P McNamara	6	6
(Australia) P Carter	2	3
(United States) L Bourne	7	6
(Australia) D Mustard	6	1
(United States) D Cassidy	2	4
2	(United States) B Testerman	6	6

Round 2
6	(United States) M Davis	6	6
(Australia) B Drewett	3	3
(Australia) B Dyke	6	6
3	(United States) M Mitchell	3	3
(Australia) C Miller	3	7	2
Q	(Australia) P McNamara	6	5	6
(United States) L Bourne	6	6	5
2	(United States) B Testerman	7	4	7

Quarter-finals
6	(United States) M Davis	7	6
(Australia) B Dyke	6	4
Q	(Australia) P McNamara	6	6	5
2	(United States) B Testerman	7	4	7

Semi-final
6	(United States) M Davis	6	6	6
2	(United States) B Testerman	4	7	4
