= 1985 GWA Mazda Tennis Classic – Singles =

Singles
- 1985 GWA Mazda Tennis Classic

Final
- Champion: (United States) Paul Annacone
- Runner-up: (New Zealand) Kelly Evernden
- Score: 6–3, 6–3

Details
- Draw: 32 (3WC/4Q/2LL)
- Seeds: 8

Events
Singles	Doubles
← 1984 ·	GWA Mazda Tennis Classic

Eliot Teltscher was the defending champion, but could not compete this year due to a shoulder injury.

Paul Annacone won the title by defeating Kelly Evernden 6–3, 6–3 in the final.

== Seeds ==
1. (United States) Paul Annacone (champion)
2. (United States) Ben Testerman (quarterfinals)
3. (United States) Terry Moor (second round)
4. (United States) Bud Schultz (quarterfinals)
5. (United States) Brian Teacher (first round)
6. (United States) Marty Davis (quarterfinals)
7. (Paraguay) Francisco González (second round)
8. (Nigeria) Nduka Odizor (first round)

== Draw ==
=== Key ===
- Q = Qualifier
- WC = Wild card
- LL = Lucky loser
- Alt = Alternate
- SE = Special exempt
- PR = Protected ranking
- ITF = ITF entry
- JE = Junior exempt
- w/o = Walkover
- r = Retired
- d = Defaulted
- SR = Special ranking

=== Finals ===
Semifinals
1	(United States) Paul Annacone	6	7
(Australia) Simon Youl	1	6
(New Zealand) Kelly Evernden	6	6	6
(United States) Glenn Layendecker	4	7	1

Final
1	(United States) Paul Annacone	6	6
(New Zealand) Kelly Evernden	3	3

=== Top half ===
First round
1	(United States) P Annacone	6	6	7
Q	(New Zealand) D Mustard	3	7	6
Q	(Australia) P Carter	6	6
LL	(Canada) M Greenan	3	2
(Australia) B Drewett	4	6	4
(United States) C Hooper	6	3	6
LL	(Australia) A Emerson	3	2
6	(United States) M Davis	6	6
3	(United States) T Moor	6	6
(Australia) J Frawley	4	2
WC	(Australia) P Flynn	6	0	3
(Australia) S Youl	4	6	6
(New Zealand) R Simpson	7	1	6
(United States) L Bourne	5	6	4
Q	(United Kingdom) S Bale	6	2	3
7	(Paraguay) F González	4	6	6

Second round
1	(United States) P Annacone	6	6
Q	(Australia) P Carter	4	3
(United States) C Hooper	2	1
6	(United States) M Davis	6	6
3	(United States) T Moor	5	7	3
(Australia) S Youl	7	6	6
(New Zealand) R Simpson	6	6
7	(Paraguay) F González	4	4

Quarterfinals
1	(United States) P Annacone	6	7	6
6	(United States) M Davis	7	6	4
(Australia) S Youl	6	6
(New Zealand) R Simpson	3	3

Semifinals
1	(United States) P Annacone	6	7
(Australia) S Youl	1	6

=== Bottom half ===
First round
8	(Nigeria) N Odizor	3	6
WC	(Australia) M Kratzmann	6	7
(New Zealand) K Evernden	6	6
(Australia) B Dyke	2	1
(Australia) D Cahill	6	2	6
(United States) T Cain	4	6	3
(United States) D Cassidy	6	2
4	(United States) B Schultz	7	6
5	(United States) B Teacher	6	6
(United States) G Layendecker	7	7
(United States) T Nelson	6	6	6
Q	(Australia) CA Miller	7	2	1
(Sweden) T Högstedt	6	0
(United States) M Freeman	7	6
WC	(Australia) D Macpherson	4	4
2	(United States) B Testerman	6	6

Second round
WC	(Australia) M Kratzmann	4	1
(New Zealand) K Evernden	6	6
(Australia) D Cahill	6	1	2
4	(United States) B Schultz	2	6	6
(United States) G Layendecker	7	7
(United States) T Nelson	6	6
(United States) M Freeman	6	6
2	(United States) B Testerman	7	7

Quarterfinals
(New Zealand) K Evernden	6	3	7
4	(United States) B Schultz	2	6	5
(United States) G Layendecker	6	6
2	(United States) B Testerman	3	4

Semifinals
(New Zealand) K Evernden	6	6	6
(United States) G Layendecker	4	7	1
