= 1982 Gloweave Indoor Championships =

Men's tennis tournament of 1982, Melbourne Indoor

- Date: 4–10 October
- Edition: 3rd
- Category: Grand Prix
- Draw: 32S / 16D
- Prize money: $100,000
- Surface: Carpet / indoor
- Location: Melbourne, Victoria, Australia
- Venue: Festival Hall

Champions

Singles
- (United States) Vitas Gerulaitis

Doubles
- (Paraguay) Francisco González / (United States) Matt Mitchell
← 1981 ·	Melbourne Indoor	· 1984 →

The 1982 Gloweave Indoor Championships, also known as the Melbourne Indoor Championships, was an Association of Tennis Professionals men's tournament played on indoor carpet courts at the Festival Hall in Melbourne, Victoria, Australia. It was the third edition of the tournament, which was part of the 1982 Grand Prix tennis circuit, and was held from 4 October until 10 October 1982. First-seeded Vitas Gerulaitis won the singles title, his second at the event after 1982, and earned $20,000 first-prize money.

== Finals ==
=== Singles ===
(United States) Vitas Gerulaitis defeated (United States) Eliot Teltscher 2–6, 6–2, 6–2

- It was Gerulaitis's 4th singles title of the year and the 23rd of his career.

=== Doubles ===
(Paraguay) Francisco González / (United States) Matt Mitchell defeated (United States) Syd Ball / (United States) Rod Frawley 7–6, 7–6
