= 1985 U.S. National Indoor Championships – Doubles =

Doubles
- 1985 U.S. National Indoor Championships

Final
- Champion: (Czechoslovakia) Pavel Složil (Czechoslovakia) Tomáš Šmíd
- Runner-up: (United States) Kevin Curren (United States) Steve Denton
- Score: 1–6, 6–3, 6–4

Events
Singles	Doubles
← 1984 ·	U.S. National Indoor Championships	· 1986 →

The Men’s Doubles tournament of the 1985 US Indoor Tennis Championships took place in Memphis, US, between 28 January and 3 February 1985. 32 players (16 pairs) from 17 countries competed in the 5-round tournament. The winning doubles pair was Pavel Složil and Tomáš Šmíd, both of Czechoslovakia, who defeated Kevin Curren and Steve Denton, both of the US, in the final 1–6, 6–3, 6–4.

== Seeds ==
1. (Czechoslovakia) Pavel Složil / (Czechoslovakia) Tomáš Šmíd (champions)
2. (Switzerland) Heinz Günthardt / (Hungary) Balázs Taróczy (2nd round)
3. (Poland) Wojciech Fibak / (United States) Sandy Mayer (semifinals)
4. (United States) Fritz Buehning / (United States) Ferdi Taygan (quarterfinals)
5. (United States) Kevin Curren / (United States) Steve Denton (final)
6. (United States) Sherwood Stewart / (Australia) Kim Warwick (semifinals)
7. (Paraguay) Francisco González / (United States) Matt Mitchell (quarterfinals)
8. (United States) David Dowlen / (Nigeria) Nduka Odizor (quarterfinals)

== Draw ==
=== Key ===
- Q = Qualifier
- WC = Wild card
- LL = Lucky loser
- Alt = Alternate
- SE = Special exempt
- PR = Protected ranking
- ITF = ITF entry
- JE = Junior exempt
- w/o = Walkover
- r = Retired
- d = Defaulted
- SR = Special ranking

=== Final ===
Final
1	(Czechoslovakia) Pavel Složil (Czechoslovakia) Tomáš Šmíd	1	6	6
5	(United States) Kevin Curren (United States) Steve Denton	6	3	4

=== Top half ===
1st Round
(United States) Gary Donnelly (United States) Butch Walts	6	4	7
(Australia) David Graham (Brazil) Cássio Motta	4	6	6
(United States) Bud Cox (United States) Terry Moor	7	6
(United States) Mark Dickson (Sweden) Jan Gunnarsson	6	2
(United States) Paul Annacone (United States) Ben Testerman	6	3	6
(United States) David Pate (United States) Hank Pfister	2	6	3
(France) Yannick Noah (France) Pascal Portes	6	3	7
(United States) Mike Leach (United States) Tim Wilkison	2	6	6

2nd Round
1	(Czechoslovakia) Pavel Složil (Czechoslovakia) Tomáš Šmíd	6	7
(United States) Gary Donnelly (United States) Butch Walts	4	5
(United States) Bud Cox (United States) Terry Moor	3	4
7	(Paraguay) F González (United States) Matt Mitchell	6	6
(United States) Paul Annacone (United States) Ben Testerman	3	5
4	(United States) Fritz Buehning (United States) Ferdi Taygan	6	7
(France) Yannick Noah (France) Pascal Portes	3	2
6	(United States) Sherwood Stewart (Australia) Kim Warwick	6	6

Quarterfinals
1	(Czechoslovakia) Pavel Složil (Czechoslovakia) Tomáš Šmíd	6	6	6
7	(Paraguay) F González (United States) Matt Mitchell	7	2	2
4	(United States) Fritz Buehning (United States) Ferdi Taygan	6	3	6
6	(United States) Sherwood Stewart (Australia) Kim Warwick	4	6	7

Semifinals
1	(Czechoslovakia) Pavel Složil (Czechoslovakia) Tomáš Šmíd	6	6
6	(United States) Sherwood Stewart (Australia) Kim Warwick	4	4

=== Bottom half ===
1st Round
(United Kingdom) John Lloyd (Paraguay) Víctor Pecci	6	6	6
(United States) Tim Gullikson (United States) Tom Gullikson	4	7	3
(United States) Mike De Palmer (United States) Bruce Manson	6	6
(United States) Marty Davis (Switzerland) Zoltán Kuhárszky	2	2
(United States) Johan Kriek (United States) Bill Scanlon	7	6
(Israel) Shlomo Glickstein (Spain) Emilio Sánchez	6	4
(Germany) Boris Becker (Germany) Andreas Maurer	6	6	6
(Chile) Ricardo Acuña (Puerto Rico) Ernesto Fernandez	4	7	3

2nd Round
(United Kingdom) John Lloyd (Paraguay) Víctor Pecci	3	3
8	(United States) David Dowlen (Nigeria) Nduka Odizor	6	6
(United States) Mike De Palmer (United States) Bruce Manson	0	3
3	(Poland) Wojciech Fibak (United States) Sandy Mayer	6	6
(United States) Johan Kriek (United States) Bill Scanlon	7	6	6
5	(United States) Kevin Curren (United States) Steve Denton	6	7	7
(Germany) Boris Becker (Germany) Andreas Maurer	6	6
2	(Switzerland) Heinz Günthardt (Hungary) Balázs Taróczy	1	1

Quarterfinals
8	(United States) David Dowlen (Nigeria) Nduka Odizor	6	6	4
3	(Poland) Wojciech Fibak (United States) Sandy Mayer	7	3	6
5	(United States) Kevin Curren (United States) Steve Denton	3	6	6
(Germany) Boris Becker (Germany) Andreas Maurer	6	4	3

Semifinals
3	(Poland) Wojciech Fibak (United States) Sandy Mayer	6	4	3
5	(United States) Kevin Curren (United States) Steve Denton	3	6	6
