= 1982 Transamerica Open – Doubles =

Doubles
- 1982 Transamerica Open

Final
- Champions: (United States) Fritz Buehning (United States) Brian Teacher
- Runners-up: (United States) Marty Davis (United States) Chris Dunk
- Score: 6–7^{(5–7)}, 6–2, 7–5

Details
- Draw: 16
- Seeds: 4

Events
Singles	Doubles
← 1981 ·	Pacific Coast Championships	· 1983 →

John McEnroe and Peter Fleming were the defending champions, but none competed this year. McEnroe opted to focus on the singles tournament, winning the title.

Fritz Buehning and Brian Teacher won the title by defeating Marty Davis and Chris Dunk 6–7^{(5–7)}, 6–2, 7–5 in the final.

== Seeds ==
1. (United States) Sherwood Stewart / (United States) Ferdi Taygan (first round)
2. (United States) Fritz Buehning / (United States) Brian Teacher (champions)
3. (Australia) Darren Cahill / (United States) Tim Gullikson (quarterfinals)
4. (United States) Mike Bauer / (United States) Tony Giammalva (first round)

== Draw ==
=== Key ===
- Q = Qualifier
- WC = Wild card
- LL = Lucky loser
- Alt = Alternate
- SE = Special exempt
- PR = Protected ranking
- ITF = ITF entry
- JE = Junior exempt
- w/o = Walkover
- r = Retired
- d = Defaulted
- SR = Special ranking

=== Draw ===
First round
1	(United States) S Stewart (United States) F Taygan	3	6	6^{0}
(United States) C Hooper (United States) P Rennert	6	4	7^{7}
(United States) E Iskersky (United Kingdom) R Lewis	6	6
(United States) M Mitchell (United States) E Sherbeck	4	4
3	(Australia) D Cahill (United States) T Gullikson	6	7^{7}
(United States) T Mayotte (United States) B Maze	4	6^{3}
(United States) M Davis (United States) C Dunk	4	6	6
(United States) M Purcell (United States) E Teltscher	6	1	4
(United States) C Strode (United States) M Strode	6	6
(United States) L Bourne (United States) V Van Patten	3	1
(Republic of Ireland) M Doyle (United States) R Fromm	6	6
4	(United States) M Bauer (United States) T Giammalva	3	4
(Canada) J Brabenec (United States) M De Palmer	7^{7}	7^{10}
(United States) P DuPré (Brazil) J Soares	6^{5}	6^{8}
(United States) M Machette (Australia) J Meyers	3	2
2	(United States) F Buehning (United States) B Teacher	6	6

Quarterfinals
(United States) C Hooper (United States) P Rennert	2	6	6
(United States) E Iskersky (United Kingdom) R Lewis	6	1	2
3	(Australia) D Cahill (United States) T Gullikson	6^{5}	3
(United States) M Davis (United States) C Dunk	7^{7}	6
(United States) C Strode (United States) M Strode	6	7^{7}
(Republic of Ireland) M Doyle (United States) R Fromm	4	6^{1}
(Canada) J Brabenec (United States) M De Palmer	6	6^{1}	3
2	(United States) F Buehning (United States) B Teacher	4	7^{7}	6

Semifinals
(United States) C Hooper (United States) P Rennert	6	4	6^{3}
(United States) M Davis (United States) C Dunk	2	6	7^{7}
(United States) C Strode (United States) M Strode	2	2
2	(United States) F Buehning (United States) B Teacher	6	6

Final
(United States) M Davis (United States) C Dunk	7^{7}	2	5
2	(United States) F Buehning (United States) B Teacher	6^{5}	6	7
