= 1985 U.S. National Indoor Championships – Singles =

Singles
- 1985 U.S. National Indoor Championships

Final
- Champion: (Sweden) Stefan Edberg
- Runner-up: (France) Yannick Noah
- Score: 6–1, 6–0

Details
- Draw: 48
- Seeds: 16

Events
Singles	Doubles
← 1984 ·	U.S. National Indoor Championships	· 1986 →

== Seeds ==
1. (United States) Jimmy Connors (semifinals)
2. (United States) Eliot Teltscher (quarterfinals)
3. (France) Yannick Noah (final)
4. (United States) Aaron Krickstein (2nd round)
5. (United States) Johan Kriek (3rd round)
6. (United States) Kevin Curren (quarterfinals)
7. (Czechoslovakia) Tomáš Šmíd (2nd round)
8. (Spain) Juan Aguilera (2nd round)
9. (Sweden) Stefan Edberg (champion)
10. (United States) Ben Testerman (2nd round)
11. (United States) Brad Gilbert (quarterfinals)
12. (India) Ramesh Krishnan (3rd round)
13. (United States) Kevin Curren (3rd round)
14. (United States) David Pate (2nd round)
15. (United States) Leif Shiras (2nd round)
16. (United States) Terry Moor (2nd round)

== Draw ==
=== Key ===
- Q = Qualifier
- WC = Wild card
- LL = Lucky loser
- Alt = Alternate
- SE = Special exempt
- PR = Protected ranking
- ITF = ITF entry
- JE = Junior exempt
- w/o = Walkover
- r = Retired
- d = Defaulted
- SR = Special ranking

=== Final ===
Semifinals
1	(United States) Jimmy Connors	1	4
9	(Sweden) Stefan Edberg	6	6
3	(France) Yannick Noah	3	6	7
2	(United States) Eliot Teltscher	6	1	5

Final
9	(Sweden) Stefan Edberg	6	6
3	(France) Yannick Noah	1	0

=== Top half ===
==== Section 1 ====
1st Round
(Sweden) Jan Gunnarsson	6	7
(United States) Vincent Van Patten	4	5
(United States) Leif Shiras	4	7	7
(Czechoslovakia) Pavel Složil	6	6	6
(United States) Bud Schultz	5	6	6
(Paraguay) Víctor Pecci	7	3	3
(Croatia) Marko Ostoja	6	6
(France) Tarik Benhabiles	4	2

2nd Round
1	(United States) Jimmy Connors	4	6	6
(Sweden) Jan Gunnarsson	6	4	0
(United States) Leif Shiras	7	6
15	(Switzerland) Heinz Günthardt	6	3
(United States) Bud Schultz	6	3
13	(United States) John Sadri	7	6
(Croatia) Marko Ostoja	2	4
6	(United States) Kevin Curren	6	6

3rd Round
1	(United States) Jimmy Connors	6	6	7
(United States) Leif Shiras	7	2	6
13	(United States) John Sadri	4	4
6	(United States) Kevin Curren	6	6

Quarterfinals
1	(United States) Jimmy Connors	7	6
6	(United States) Kevin Curren	6	4

==== Section 2 ====
1st Round
(United States) Marty Davis	6	6
(Israel) Shlomo Glickstein	2	3
(United Kingdom) John Lloyd	6	6
(United States) Tom Gullikson	3	3
(United States) Tim Wilkison	7	6	6
(United States) Peter Fleming	5	7	3
(United States) Jay Lapidus	7	6
(Spain) Alberto Tous	5	2

2nd Round
4	(United States) Aaron Krickstein	3	5
(United States) Marty Davis	6	7
(United Kingdom) John Lloyd	5	3
9	(Sweden) Stefan Edberg	7	6
(United States) Tim Wilkison	4	3
11	(United States) Brad Gilbert	6	6
(United States) Jay Lapidus	6	6
8	(Spain) Juan Aguilera	3	1

3rd Round
(United States) Marty Davis	6	0
9	(Sweden) Stefan Edberg	7	6
11	(United States) Brad Gilbert	6	6
(United States) Jay Lapidus	1	4

Quarterfinals
9	(Sweden) Stefan Edberg	6	6
11	(United States) Brad Gilbert	4	2

=== Bottom half ===
==== Section 3 ====
1st Round
(Germany) Boris Becker	6	6
(Poland) Wojciech Fibak	2	1
(Israel) Shahar Perkiss	6	6
(United States) Bill Scanlon	3	1
(United States) Tim Gullikson	2	6	7
(Netherlands) Michiel Schapers	6	4	5
(United States) Sandy Mayer	6	6
(Nigeria) Nduka Odizor	3	2

2nd Round
7	(Czechoslovakia) Tomáš Šmíd	2	4
(Germany) Boris Becker	6	6
(Israel) Shahar Perkiss	4	7	6
14	(United States) David Pate	6	5	1
16	(United States) Terry Moor	2	2
(United States) Tim Gullikson	6	6
(United States) Sandy Mayer	4	3
3	(France) Yannick Noah	6	6

3rd Round
(Germany) Boris Becker	6	4	4
(Israel) Shahar Perkiss	4	6	6
(United States) Tim Gullikson	6	6	3
3	(France) Yannick Noah	7	3	6

Quarterfinals
(Israel) Shahar Perkiss	3	6	3
3	(France) Yannick Noah	6	3	6

==== Section 4 ====
1st Round
(Switzerland) Zoltán Kuhárszky	7	6	6
(United States) Roscoe Tanner	5	7	4
(United States) Greg Holmes	6	7
(United States) Matt Mitchell	2	5
(Czechoslovakia) Miloslav Mečíř	6	6
(Switzerland) Jakob Hlasek	4	3
(United States) Mark Dickson	6	6
(France) Thierry Tulasne	3	3

2nd Round
(Switzerland) Zoltán Kuhárszky	6	2	2
5	(United States) Johan Kriek	3	6	6
(United States) Greg Holmes	6	6
10	(United States) Ben Testerman	3	4
(Czechoslovakia) Miloslav Mečíř	2	3
12	(India) Ramesh Krishnan	6	6
(United States) Mark Dickson	6	4
2	(United States) Eliot Teltscher	7	6

3rd Round
5	(United States) Johan Kriek	6	6	3
(United States) Greg Holmes	3	7	6
12	(India) Ramesh Krishnan	3	1
2	(United States) Eliot Teltscher	6	6

Quarterfinals
(United States) Greg Holmes	6	3
2	(United States) Eliot Teltscher	7	6
