= 1982 Transamerica Open =

- Date: September 20–26
- Edition: 94th
- Category: Grand Prix (Super Series)
- Draw: 32S / 16D
- Prize money: $200,000
- Surface: Carpet / indoor
- Location: San Francisco, U.S.
- Venue: Cow Palace

Champions

Singles
- (United States) John McEnroe

Doubles
- (United States) Fritz Buehning / (United States) Brian Teacher
← 1981 ·	Pacific Coast Championships	· 1983 →

The 1982 Transamerica Open, also known as the Pacific Coast Championships, was a men's tennis tournament played on indoor carpet courts at the Cow Palace in San Francisco, California in the United States. The event was part of the Super Series of the 1982 Volvo Grand Prix circuit. It was the 94th edition of the tournament and was held from September 20 through September 26, 1982. Second-seeded John McEnroe won the singles title, his third at the event after 1978 and 1979 and earned $40,000 first-prize money.

== Finals ==
=== Singles ===
(United States) John McEnroe defeated (United States) Jimmy Connors 6–1, 6–3

- It was McEnroe's 2nd singles title of the year and the 36th of his career.

=== Doubles ===
(United States) Fritz Buehning / (United States) Brian Teacher defeated (United States) Marty Davis / (United States) Chris Dunk 6–7^{(5–7)}, 6–2, 7–5

== See also ==
- Connors–McEnroe rivalry
