= 1985 Black & Decker Indoor Championships – Doubles =

Doubles
- 1985 Black & Decker Indoor Championships

Final
- Champions: (Australia) Brad Drewett (United States) Matt Mitchell
- Runners-up: (United States) David Dowlen (Nigeria) Nduka Odizor
- Score: 4–6, 7–6, 6–4

Details
- Draw: 16 (1WC)
- Seeds: 4

Events
Singles	Doubles
← 1984 ·	Melbourne Indoor

Broderick Dyke and Wally Masur were the defending champions, but lost in the quarterfinals to Kelly Evernden and Michael Fancutt.

Brad Drewett and Matt Mitchell won the title by defeating David Dowlen and Nduka Odizor 4–6, 7–6, 6–4 in the final.

== Seeds ==
1. (United States) Paul Annacone / (South Africa) Christo van Rensburg (semifinals)
2. (Australia) Broderick Dyke / (Australia) Wally Masur (quarterfinals)
3. (United States) David Dowlen / (Nigeria) Nduka Odizor (final)
4. (Paraguay) Francisco González / (Australia) David Graham (first round)

== Draw ==
=== Key ===
- Q = Qualifier
- WC = Wild card
- LL = Lucky loser
- Alt = Alternate
- SE = Special exempt
- PR = Protected ranking
- ITF = ITF entry
- JE = Junior exempt
- w/o = Walkover
- r = Retired
- d = Defaulted
- SR = Special ranking

=== Draw ===
First round
1	(United States) P Annacone (South Africa) C van Rensburg	6	6
(United States) T Moor (United States) B Testerman	3	4
(United States) M Bauer (United States) L Bourne	6	7
(Australia) CA Miller (Australia) L Warder	2	6
4	(Paraguay) F González (Australia) D Graham	6	5	3
(United States) B Dickinson (New Zealand) D Mustard	1	7	6
(Australia) J Alexander (Australia) M Woodforde	6	2
(Australia) B Drewett (United States) M Mitchell	7	6
(Australia) M Kratzmann (Australia) S Youl	7	6	6
(United States) D Cassidy (United States) G Layendecker	6	7	3
WC	(Australia) S Barr (Australia) P McNamara	3	6	3
3	(United States) D Dowlen (Nigeria) N Odizor	6	3	6
(New Zealand) K Evernden (Australia) M Fancutt	6	6	6
(United States) M Freeman (United States) B Teacher	4	7	3
(Australia) D Cahill (Australia) P Carter	6	7	6
2	(Australia) B Dyke (Australia) W Masur	7	6	7

Quarterfinals
1	(United States) P Annacone (South Africa) C van Rensburg	6	6
(United States) M Bauer (United States) L Bourne	4	3
(United States) B Dickinson (New Zealand) D Mustard	3	6
(Australia) B Drewett (United States) M Mitchell	6	7
(Australia) M Kratzmann (Australia) S Youl	6	6	6
3	(United States) D Dowlen (Nigeria) N Odizor	7	4	7
(New Zealand) K Evernden (Australia) M Fancutt	6	7
2	(Australia) B Dyke (Australia) W Masur	3	6

Semifinals
1	(United States) P Annacone (South Africa) C van Rensburg	5	5
(Australia) B Drewett (United States) M Mitchell	7	7
3	(United States) D Dowlen (Nigeria) N Odizor	7	4	7
(New Zealand) K Evernden (Australia) M Fancutt	5	6	5

Final
(Australia) B Drewett (United States) M Mitchell	4	7	6
3	(United States) D Dowlen (Nigeria) N Odizor	6	6	4
