= 1985 GWA Mazda Tennis Classic – Doubles =

Doubles
- 1985 GWA Mazda Tennis Classic

Final
- Champions: (United States) Marty Davis (Australia) Brad Drewett
- Runners-up: (United States) Bud Schultz (United States) Ben Testerman
- Score: 6–2, 6–2

Details
- Draw: 16 (1WC)
- Seeds: 4

Events
Singles	Doubles
← 1984 ·	GWA Mazda Tennis Classic

Francisco González and Matt Mitchell were the defending champions, but Mitchell did not compete this year. González teamed up with David Graham and lost in the first round to Marty Davis and Brad Drewett.

Davis and Brewett won the title by defeating Bud Schultz and Ben Testerman 6–2, 6–2 in the final.

== Seeds ==
1. (United States) Paul Annacone / (Australia) Michael Fancutt (quarterfinals)
2. (United States) David Dowlen / (Nigeria) Nduka Odizor (first round)
3. (Paraguay) Francisco González / (Australia) David Graham (first round)
4. (United States) Lloyd Bourne / (Australia) Broderick Dyke (semifinals)

== Draw ==
=== Key ===
- Q = Qualifier
- WC = Wild card
- LL = Lucky loser
- Alt = Alternate
- SE = Special exempt
- PR = Protected ranking
- ITF = ITF entry
- JE = Junior exempt
- w/o = Walkover
- r = Retired
- d = Defaulted
- SR = Special ranking

=== Draw ===
First round
1	(United States) P Annacone (Australia) M Fancutt	6	6
(Australia) C Fancutt (Australia) J Frawley	4	3
(United States) C Hooper (United States) B Teacher	6	6	6
(United States) D Cassidy (United States) G Layendecker	7	3	3
3	(Paraguay) F González (Australia) D Graham	4	5
(United States) M Davis (Australia) B Drewett	6	7
(United States) T Moor (United States) T Nelson	3	6
(Australia) M Kratzmann (Australia) S Youl	6	7
(United States) M Freeman (New Zealand) R Simpson	6	6
WC	(Australia) D Houston (Australia) D Tyson	4	4
(New Zealand) K Evernden (New Zealand) D Mustard	6	7	6
4	(United States) L Bourne (Australia) B Dyke	7	6	7
(Australia) D Cahill (Australia) P Carter	6	3	4
(United States) B Schultz (United States) B Testerman	4	6	6
(Australia) CA Miller (Australia) L Warder	7	7
2	(United States) D Dowlen (Nigeria) N Odizor	6	5

Quarterfinals
1	(United States) P Annacone (Australia) M Fancutt	3	4
(United States) C Hooper (United States) B Teacher	6	6
(United States) M Davis (Australia) B Drewett	6	6
(Australia) M Kratzmann (Australia) S Youl	3	3
(United States) M Freeman (New Zealand) R Simpson	3	6	2
4	(United States) L Bourne (Australia) B Dyke	6	1	6
(United States) B Schultz (United States) B Testerman	6	6
(Australia) CA Miller (Australia) L Warder	3	3

Semifinals
(United States) C Hooper (United States) B Teacher	6	6	3
(United States) M Davis (Australia) B Drewett	7	2	6
4	(United States) L Bourne (Australia) B Dyke	2	6	6
(United States) B Schultz (United States) B Testerman	6	3	7

Final
(United States) M Davis (Australia) B Drewett	6	6
(United States) B Schultz (United States) B Testerman	2	2
