= 1981 Seiko Hong Kong Classic – Singles =

Singles
- 1981 Seiko Hong Kong Classic

Final
- Champion: (United States) Van Winitsky
- Runner-up: (Australia) Mark Edmondson
- Score: 6–4, 6–7^{(7–9)}, 6–4

Details
- Draw: 32
- Seeds: 8

Events
Singles	Doubles
← 1980 ·	Hong Kong Open	· 1982 →

Ivan Lendl was the defending champion, but did not compete this year.

Van Winitsky won the title by defeating Mark Edmondson 6–4, 6–7^{(7–9)}, 6–4 in the final. The match was completed the following day due to a rain.

== Seeds ==
1. (Australia) Kim Warwick (second round, retired)
2. (United States) John Sadri (quarterfinals)
3. (United States) Bill Scanlon (second round)
4. (New Zealand) Chris Lewis (quarterfinals)
5. (Australia) Mark Edmondson (final)
6. (Australia) John Fitzgerald (first round)
7. (United States) Pat DuPré (second round)
8. (United States) Bruce Manson (quarterfinals)

== Draw ==
=== Key ===
- Q = Qualifier
- WC = Wild card
- LL = Lucky loser
- Alt = Alternate
- SE = Special exempt
- PR = Protected ranking
- ITF = ITF entry
- JE = Junior exempt
- w/o = Walkover
- r = Retired
- d = Defaulted
- SR = Special ranking

=== Finals ===
Semifinals
(United States) Van Winitsky	7	6	6
(United States) Marty Davis	5	7	3
(United States) Tim Gullikson	3	6
5	(Australia) Mark Edmondson	6	7

Final
(United States) Van Winitsky	6	6^{7}	6
5	(Australia) Mark Edmondson	4	7^{9}	4

=== Top half ===
First round
1	(Australia) K Warwick	5	7	6
(United Kingdom) C Mottram	7	5	0
(United States) V Winitsky	6	7
(Austria) P Feigl	2	6
(United States) L Bourne	2	6	6
(United States) T Moor	6	3	4
(United States) M Cahill	7	6
6	(Australia) J Fitzgerald	5	1
3	(United States) B Scanlon	6	7
(United States) T Graham	1	6
(United States) M Bauer	4	3
(United States) M Davis	6	6
(Australia) R Frawley	4	7	6
(United States) J Austin	6	6	7
(India) S Menon	0	7	3
8	(United States) B Manson	6	6	6

Second round
1	(Australia) K Warwick	4	0
(United States) V Winitsky	6	3^{r}
(United States) L Bourne	6	6
(United States) M Cahill	4	2
3	(United States) B Scanlon	3	5
(United States) M Davis	6	7
(United States) J Austin	5	3
8	(United States) B Manson	7	6

Quarterfinals
(United States) V Winitsky	6	6	6
(United States) L Bourne	3	7	3
(United States) M Davis	6	6
8	(United States) B Manson	1	3

Semifinals
(United States) V Winitsky	7	6	6
(United States) M Davis	5	7	3

=== Bottom half ===
First round
7	(United States) P DuPré	6	6	6
(United States) R Van't Hof	7	2	4
(Nigeria) N Odizor	6	2
(United States) Ti Gullikson	7	6
(United States) J Delaney	2	6	1
(United States) V Van Patten	6	3	6
(Switzerland) I Dupasquier	1	6	5
4	(New Zealand) C Lewis	6	3	7
5	(Australia) M Edmondson	1	7	6
(Netherlands) L Sanders	6	6	4
(Australia) B Drewett	6	4	6
(India) R Krishnan	2	6	3
(United States) C Mayotte	7	6
(United States) L Stefanki	6	2
(United States) D Gitlin	3	6	1
2	(United States) J Sadri	6	3	6

Second round
7	(United States) P DuPré	3	5
(United States) Ti Gullikson	6	7
(United States) V Van Patten	1	6	1
4	(New Zealand) C Lewis	6	2	6
5	(Australia) M Edmondson	6	6
(Australia) B Drewett	0	2
(United States) C Mayotte	1	4
2	(United States) J Sadri	6	6

Quarterfinals
(United States) Ti Gullikson	7	6
4	(New Zealand) C Lewis	6	3
5	(Australia) M Edmondson	7	6
2	(United States) J Sadri	6	4

Semifinals
(United States) Ti Gullikson	3	6
5	(Australia) M Edmondson	6	7
