= 1981 Seiko Hong Kong Classic =

Tennis tournament

- Date: 2–8 November
- Edition: 9th
- Category: Grand Prix
- Draw: 32S / 16D
- Prize money: $75,000
- Surface: Hard / outdoor
- Location: Hong Kong

Champions

Singles
- (United States) Van Winitsky

Doubles
- (United States) Chris Mayotte / (United States) Chris Dunk
← 1980 ·	Hong Kong Open	· 1982 →

The 1981 Seiko Hong Kong Classic, also known as the Hong Kong Open, was a men's tennis tournament played on outdoor hard courts in Hong Kong that was part of the 1981 Grand Prix tennis circuit. It was the ninth edition of the event and was held from 2 November through 8 November 1981. Unseeded Van Winitsky won the singles title.

== Finals ==
=== Singles ===
(United States) Van Winitsky defeated (Australia) Mark Edmondson 6–4, 6–7^{(7–9)}, 6–4

- It was Winitsky's first singles title of his career.

=== Doubles ===
(United States) Chris Mayotte / (United States) Chris Dunk defeated (United States) Marty Davis / (Australia) Brad Drewett 6–4, 7–6
