= 1985 Black & Decker Indoor Championships =

Men's tennis tournament of 1985, Melbourne Indoor

- Date: 21–27 October
- Edition: 5th
- Category: Grand Prix
- Draw: 32S / 16D
- Prize money: $100,000
- Surface: Carpet / indoor
- Location: Melbourne, Victoria, Australia
- Venue: Festival Hall

Champions

Singles
- (United States) Marty Davis

Doubles
- (Australia) Brad Drewett / (United States) Matt Mitchell
← 1984 ·	Melbourne Indoor

The 1985 Black & Decker Indoor Championships, also known as the Melbourne Indoor Championships, was an Association of Tennis Professionals men's tournament played on indoor carpet courts at the Festival Hall in Melbourne, Victoria, Australia. It was the fifth and last edition of the tournament, which was part of the 1985 Grand Prix tennis circuit, and was held from 21 October until 27 October 1985. Sixth-seeded Marty Davis won the singles title.

== Finals ==
=== Singles ===
(United States) Marty Davis defeated (United States) Paul Annacone, 6–4, 6–4

- It was Davis' 2nd singles title of the year and the 4th of his career.

=== Doubles ===
(Australia) Brad Drewett / (United States) Matt Mitchell defeated (United States) David Dowlen / (Nigeria) Nduka Odizor, 4–6, 7–6, 6–4
