= 1981 Seiko Hong Kong Classic – Doubles =

Doubles
- 1981 Seiko Hong Kong Classic

Final
- Champions: (United States) Chris Mayotte (United States) Chris Dunk
- Runners-up: (United States) Marty Davis (Australia) Brad Drewett
- Score: 6–4, 7–6

Details
- Draw: 16
- Seeds: 4

Events
| Singles | Doubles |
| ← 1980 · | Hong Kong Open | · 1982 → |

Ferdi Taygan and Peter Fleming were the defending champions, but none competed this year. Taygan chose to compete at Stockholm during the same week, finishing as runner-up alongside Sherwood Stewart.

Chris Mayotte and Chris Dunk won the title by defeating Marty Davis and Brad Drewett 6–4, 7–6 in the final.

== Seeds ==
1. (United States) Tim Gullikson / (United States) Bruce Manson (first round, withdrew)
2. (United States) Terry Moor / (United Kingdom) Buster Mottram (first round)
3. (United States) John Austin / (United States) Mike Cahill (semifinals)
4. (Australia) Rod Frawley / (New Zealand) Chris Lewis (semifinals)

== Draw ==
=== Key ===
- Q = Qualifier
- WC = Wild card
- LL = Lucky loser
- Alt = Alternate
- SE = Special exempt
- PR = Protected ranking
- ITF = ITF entry
- JE = Junior exempt
- w/o = Walkover
- r = Retired
- d = Defaulted
- SR = Special ranking

=== Draw ===
First round
1 | (United States) T Gullikson (United States) B Manson
(United States) M Davis (Australia) B Drewett | w/o
(United States) P DuPré (United States) M Estep | 8
(Switzerland) I Dupasquier (United States) Bob Weise | 6
3 | (United States) J Austin (United States) M Cahill | 8
(United States) Weller Evans (Austria) HP Kandler | 5
(United States) J Bailey (United States) J Delaney | 8
(Austria) H Kary (Netherlands) L Sanders | 9
(United States) T Graham (Nigeria) N Odizor | 8
(Australia) H Hansson (Netherlands) E Wilborts | 5
(United States) L Bourne (United States) V Winitsky
4 | (Australia) R Frawley (New Zealand) C Lewis | w/o
(United States) C Dunk (United States) C Mayotte | 8
(United States) L Stefanki (United States) R Van't Hof | 5
(United States) M Bauer (United States) J Benson | 8
2 | (United States) T Moor (United Kingdom) B Mottram | 6

Quarterfinals
(United States) M Davis (Australia) B Drewett | 2 | 7 | 7
(United States) P DuPré (United States) M Estep | 6 | 5 | 5
3 | (United States) J Austin (United States) M Cahill | 6 | 6
(Austria) H Kary (Netherlands) L Sanders | 4 | 3
(United States) T Graham (Nigeria) N Odizor | 6 | 7 | 5
4 | (Australia) R Frawley (New Zealand) C Lewis | 7 | 6 | 7
(United States) C Dunk (United States) C Mayotte | 6 | 6
(United States) M Bauer (United States) J Benson | 1 | 3

Semifinals
(United States) M Davis (Australia) B Drewett | 3 | 6 | 6
3 | (United States) J Austin (United States) M Cahill | 6 | 3 | 2
4 | (Australia) R Frawley (New Zealand) C Lewis | 6 | 6 | 2
(United States) C Dunk (United States) C Mayotte | 3 | 7 | 6

Final
(United States) M Davis (Australia) B Drewett | 4 | 6
(United States) C Dunk (United States) C Mayotte | 6 | 7
