= 1983 GWA Tennis Classic =

- Date: 3–9 October
- Edition: 1st
- Category: Grand Prix
- Draw: 32S / 16D
- Prize money: $100,000
- Surface: Carpet / indoor
- Location: Brisbane, Queensland, Australia
- Venue: Sleeman Centre

Champions

Singles
- (Australia) Pat Cash

Doubles
- (Australia) Paul McNamee / (Australia) Pat Cash
GWA Mazda Tennis Classic	· 1984 →

The 1983 GWA Tennis Classic was a men's tennis tournament played on indoor carpet courts at the Sleeman Centre in Brisbane, Queensland in Australia that was part of the 1983 Volvo Grand Prix. It was the inaugural edition of the tournament and was held from 3 October through 9 October 1983. Eighth-seeded Pat Cash won the singles title.

== Finals ==
=== Singles ===
(Australia) Pat Cash defeated (Australia) Paul McNamee 4–6, 6–4, 6–3

- It was Cash's 1st singles title of the year and the 2nd of his career.

=== Doubles ===
(Australia) Paul McNamee / (Australia) Pat Cash defeated (Australia) Mark Edmondson / (Australia) Kim Warwick 7–6, 7–6
