= 1985 GWA Mazda Tennis Classic =

- Date: 7–13 October
- Edition: 3rd
- Category: Grand Prix
- Draw: 32S / 16D
- Prize money: $80,000
- Surface: Carpet / indoor
- Location: Brisbane, Queensland, Australia

Champions

Singles
- (United States) Paul Annacone

Doubles
- (United States) Marty Davis / (Australia) Brad Drewett
← 1984 ·	GWA Mazda Tennis Classic

The 1985 GWA Mazda Tennis Classic was a men's tennis tournament played on indoor carpet courts in Brisbane, Queensland in Australia that was part of the 1985 Nabisco Grand Prix. It was the third and last edition of the tournament and was held from 7 October through 13 October 1985. First-seeded Paul Annacone won the singles title.

== Finals ==
=== Singles ===
(United States) Paul Annacone defeated (New Zealand) Kelly Evernden 6–3, 6–3

- It was Annacone's 2nd singles title of the year and of his career.

=== Doubles ===
(United States) Marty Davis / (Australia) Brad Drewett defeated (United States) Bud Schultz / (United States) Ben Testerman 6–2, 6–2
