= 1983 ABN World Tennis Tournament – Doubles =

Doubles
- 1983 ABN World Tennis Tournament

Final
- Champions: (United States) Fritz Buehning (United States) Tom Gullikson
- Runners-up: (United States) Peter Fleming (Czechoslovakia) Pavel Složil
- Score: 7–6, 4–6, 7–6

Details
- Draw: 16
- Seeds: 4

Events
Singles	Doubles
- Rotterdam Open

Mark Edmondson and Sherwood Stewart were the defending champions, but chose to compete this year with different partners. Edmondson teamed up with John Fitzgerald and lost in the quarterfinals to Broderick Dyke and Rod Frawley, while Stewart teamed up with Ferdi Taygan and also lost in the quarterfinals to Rick Meyer and Wolfgang Popp.

Fritz Buehning and Tom Gullikson won the title by defeating Peter Fleming and Pavel Složil 7–6, 4–6, 7–6 in the final.

== Seeds ==
1. (United States) Sherwood Stewart / (United States) Ferdi Taygan (quarterfinals)
2. (United States) Peter Fleming / (Czechoslovakia) Pavel Složil (final)
3. (Australia) Mark Edmondson / (Australia) John Fitzgerald (quarterfinals)
4. (United States) Fritz Buehning / (United States) Tom Gullikson (champions)

== Draw ==
Key

- Q = Qualifier
- WC = Wild card
- LL = Lucky loser
- Alt = Alternate
- ITF = ITF entry
- PR = Protected ranking
- SR = Special ranking
- SE = Special exempt
- JE = Junior exempt
- JR = Junior Accelerator Programme entrant
- CO = College Accelerator Programme entrant
- NG = Next Gen Accelerator Program entrant
- w/o = Walkover
- r = Retired
- d = Defaulted

=== Draw ===
First round
1	(United States) S Stewart (United States) F Taygan	6	6
(United States) L Stefanki (United States) R Van't Hof	2	3
(United States) R Meyer (West Germany) W Popp	6	6
(Australia) B Drewett (United Kingdom) J Feaver	3	4
4	(United States) F Buehning (United States) T Gullikson	6	6	6
(United States) V Amaya (United States) H Pfister	7	3	4
(United States) S Mayer (South Africa) F McMillan	7	6
(United States) A Andrews (United States) J Sadri	6	4
(Australia) B Dyke (Australia) R Frawley	6	3	6
(United States) M Davis (United States) C Dunk	2	6	3
(United States) M Purcell (United States) T Wilkison	1	6	3
3	(Australia) M Edmondson (Australia) J Fitzgerald	6	3	6
(United States) M De Palmer (United States) T Mayotte	6	6
(Netherlands) M Albert (Netherlands) H van Boeckel	1	2
(Chile) J Fillol (Chile) P Rebolledo	3	6
2	(United States) P Fleming (Czechoslovakia) P Složil	6	7

Quarterfinals
1	(United States) S Stewart (United States) F Taygan	6	4	1
(United States) R Meyer (West Germany) W Popp	2	6	6
4	(United States) F Buehning (United States) T Gullikson	7	4	6
(United States) S Mayer (South Africa) F McMillan	6	6	3
(Australia) B Dyke (Australia) R Frawley	6	7
3	(Australia) M Edmondson (Australia) J Fitzgerald	4	5
(United States) M De Palmer (United States) T Mayotte	5	1
2	(United States) P Fleming (Czechoslovakia) P Složil	7	6

Semifinals
(United States) R Meyer (West Germany) W Popp	2	2
4	(United States) F Buehning (United States) T Gullikson	6	6
(Australia) B Dyke (Australia) R Frawley	7	2	4
2	(United States) P Fleming (Czechoslovakia) P Složil	6	6	6

Final
4	(United States) F Buehning (United States) T Gullikson	7	4	7
2	(United States) P Fleming (Czechoslovakia) P Složil	6	6	6
