= 1984 GWA Mazda Tennis Classic =

- Date: 1–7 October
- Edition: 2nd
- Category: Grand Prix
- Draw: 32S / 16D
- Prize money: $100,000
- Surface: Carpet / indoor
- Location: Brisbane, Queensland, Australia

Champions

Singles
- (United States) Eliot Teltscher

Doubles
- (Paraguay) Francisco González / (United States) Matt Mitchell
| ← 1983 · | GWA Mazda Tennis Classic | · 1985 → |

The 1984 GWA Mazda Tennis Classic was a men's tennis tournament played on indoor carpet courts in Brisbane, Queensland in Australia that was part of the 1984 Volvo Grand Prix. It was the second edition of the tournament and was held from 1 October through 7 October 1984. First-seeded Eliot Teltscher won the singles title.

== Finals ==
=== Singles ===
(United States) Eliot Teltscher defeated (Paraguay) Francisco González 3–6, 6–3, 6–4

- It was Teltscher's 1st singles title of the year and the 8th of his career.

=== Doubles ===
(Paraguay) Francisco González / (United States) Matt Mitchell defeated (Australia) Broderick Dyke / (Australia) Wally Masur 6–7, 6–2, 7–5
