= 1984 Black & Decker Indoor Championships =

Men's tennis tournament of 1984, Melbourne Indoor

- Date: 14–20 October
- Edition: 4th
- Category: Grand Prix
- Draw: 32S / 16D
- Prize money: $150,000
- Surface: Carpet / indoor
- Location: Melbourne, Victoria, Australia
- Venue: Festival Hall

Champions

Singles
- (United States) Matt Mitchell

Doubles
- (Australia) Broderick Dyke / (Australia) Wally Masur
← 1982 ·	Melbourne Indoor	· 1985 →

The 1984 Black & Decker Indoor Championships, also known as the Melbourne Indoor Championships, was an Association of Tennis Professionals men's tournament played on indoor carpet courts at the Festival Hall in Melbourne, Victoria, Australia. It was the fourth edition of the tournament, which was part of the 1984 Grand Prix tennis circuit, and was held from 14 October until 20 October 1984. Unseeded Matt Mitchell won the singles title.

== Finals ==
=== Singles ===
(United States) Matt Mitchell defeated (Australia) Pat Cash 6–4, 3–6, 6–2

- It was Mitchell's only singles title of his career.

=== Doubles ===
(Australia) Broderick Dyke / (Australia) Wally Masur defeated (Australia) Peter Johnston / (Australia) John McCurdy 6–2, 6–3
