= 1983 ABN World Tennis Tournament – Singles =

Singles
- 1983 ABN World Tennis Tournament

Final
- Champion: (United States) Gene Mayer
- Runner-up: (Argentina) Guillermo Vilas
- Score: 6–1, 7–6^{(11–9)}

Details
- Draw: 32
- Seeds: 8

Events
Singles	Doubles
- ABN World Tennis Tournament

First-seeded Guillermo Vilas was the defending champion of the singles event at the ABN World Tennis Tournament, but lost in the final against second-seeded Gene Mayer 6–1, 7–6^{(11–9)}.

== Seeds ==
1. (Argentina) Guillermo Vilas (final)
2. (United States) Gene Mayer (champion)
3. (Australia) Peter McNamara (first round)
4. (United States) Sandy Mayer (first round)
5. (Australia) Mark Edmondson (first round)
6. (United States) Tim Mayotte (first round)
7. (United Kingdom) Buster Mottram (first round)
8. (United States) Mel Purcell (first round)

== Draw ==
=== Finals ===
Semifinals
1	(Argentina) Guillermo Vilas	3	6	6
(Australia) John Fitzgerald	6	4	1
(United States) Fritz Buehning	1	4
2	(United States) Gene Mayer	6	6

Final
1	(Argentina) Guillermo Vilas	1	6
2	(United States) Gene Mayer	6	7

==== Upper half ====
First round
1	(Argentina) Guillermo Vilas	7	6
(Czechoslovakia) Pavel Složil	5	1
Q	(Switzerland) Jakob Hlasek	7	6
(United States) Andy Andrews	6	1
(United States) Mike De Palmer	6	6
Q	(Socialist Federal Republic of Yugoslavia) Marko Ostoja	2	0
(United States) Tim Wilkison	3	6	6
8	(United States) Mel Purcell	6	4	2
3	(Australia) Peter McNamara	6	6	r
Q	(Czechoslovakia) Jiří Granát	7	6
(Australia) John Fitzgerald	3	6	6
(United States) Brad Gilbert	6	4	2
(Chile) Jaime Fillol	6	7
(Colombia) Jairo Velasco	1	5
(United States) Nick Saviano	7	6
5	(Australia) Mark Edmondson	6	2

Second round
1	(Argentina) Guillermo Vilas	6	6
Q	(Switzerland) Jakob Hlasek	3	3
(United States) Mike De Palmer	2	4
(United States) Tim Wilkison	6	6
Q	(Czechoslovakia) Jiří Granát	4	2
(Australia) John Fitzgerald	6	6
(Chile) Jaime Fillol	5	4
(United States) Nick Saviano	7	6

Quarterfinals
1	(Argentina) Guillermo Vilas	6	6
(United States) Tim Wilkison	3	3
(Australia) John Fitzgerald	7	6
(United States) Nick Saviano	6	3

Semifinals
1	(Argentina) Guillermo Vilas	3	6	6
(Australia) John Fitzgerald	6	4	1

==== Lower half ====
First round
6	(United States) Tim Mayotte	2	3
(United States) Fritz Buehning	6	6
Q	(United States) Erick Iskersky	5	3
(United States) Victor Amaya	7	6
(India) Vijay Amritraj	7	5	1/r
(United States) Hank Pfister	6	7	2
(Belgium) Bernard Boileau	7	4	6
4	(United States) Sandy Mayer	6	6	2
7	(United Kingdom) Buster Mottram	3	6	2
(United States) Vincent Van Patten	6	1	6
(United States) Pat Dupre	6	5	1
(United States) Tom Gullikson	3	7	6
(Australia) Russell Simpson	6	6
(United States) Sammy Giammalva	3	0
(Netherlands) Michiel Schapers	6	5	1
2	(United States) Gene Mayer	0	7	6

Second round
(United States) Fritz Buehning	5	6	6
(United States) Victor Amaya	7	4	4
(United States) Hank Pfister	7	6
(Belgium) Bernard Boileau	5	0
(United States) Vincent Van Patten	6	6
(United States) Tom Gullikson	4	4
(Australia) Russell Simpson	0	3
2	(United States) Gene Mayer	6	6

Quarterfinals
(United States) Fritz Buehning	6	3	6
(United States) Hank Pfister	3	6	0
(United States) Vincent Van Patten	4	2
2	(United States) Gene Mayer	6	6

Semifinals
(United States) Fritz Buehning	2	1
2	(United States) Gene Mayer	6	6
