= 1983 ABN World Tennis Tournament =

- Date: 14–20 March
- Edition: 11th
- Category: Grand Prix circuit
- Draw: 32S / 16D
- Prize money: $250,000
- Surface: Carpet / indoor
- Location: Rotterdam, Netherlands
- Venue: Rotterdam Ahoy

Champions

Singles
- (United States) Gene Mayer

Doubles
- (United States) Fritz Buehning / (United States) Tom Gullikson
- ABN World Tennis Tournament

The 1983 ABN World Tennis Tournament was a men's tennis tournament played on indoor carpet courts at the Rotterdam Ahoy in the Netherlands. It was part of the 1983 Volvo Grand Prix circuit. It was the 11th edition of the tournament and was held from 14 March through 20 March 1983. Second-seeded Gene Mayer won the singles title.

== Finals ==
=== Singles ===
(United States) Gene Mayer defeated (Argentina) Guillermo Vilas 6–1, 7–6^{(11–9)}

=== Doubles ===
(United States) Fritz Buehning / (United States) Tom Gullikson defeated (United States) Peter Fleming / (Czechoslovakia) Pavel Složil 7–6, 4–6, 7–6
