= 1985 U.S. National Indoor Championships =

- Date: January 28 – February 3
- Edition: 15th
- Category: Grand Prix circuit
- Draw: 48S / 24D
- Prize money: $250,000
- Surface: Carpet / indoor
- Location: Memphis, TN, United States
- Venue: Racquet Club of Memphis

Champions

Singles
- (Sweden) Stefan Edberg

Doubles
- (Czechoslovakia) Pavel Složil / (Czechoslovakia) Tomáš Šmíd
- U.S. National Indoor Championships

The 1985 U.S. Indoor Championships was a men's tennis tournament played on indoor carpet courts that was part of the 1985 Nabisco Grand Prix. It was the 15th edition of the tournament and was played at the Racquet Club of Memphis in Memphis, Tennessee in the United States from January 28 to February 3, 1985. Ninth-seeded Stefan Edberg won the singles title.

== Finals ==
=== Singles ===
(Sweden) Stefan Edberg defeated (France) Yannick Noah 6–1, 6–0

- It was Edberg's first singles title of the year and the second of his career.

=== Doubles ===
(Czechoslovakia) Pavel Složil / (Czechoslovakia) Tomáš Šmíd defeated (South Africa) Kevin Curren / (United States) Steve Denton 1–6, 6–3, 6–4

- It was Složil's 1st title of the year and the 27th of his career. It was Šmíd's 1st title of the year and the 33rd of his career.

== Prize money ==
Event	W	F	SF	QF	Round of 16	Round of 32	Round of 64
Singles	$45,000	$22,500	$11,750	$6,350	$3,525	$2,000	$1,150
Doubles	$14,000	$7,000	$3,750	$2,175	$1,350	$875	—N/a
Doubles prize money per team
