= 1981 Miracle Indoor Championships =

Men's tennis tournament of 1981, Melbourne Indoor

- Date: 19–25 October
- Edition: 2nd
- Category: Grand Prix
- Draw: 32S / 16D
- Prize money: $125,000
- Surface: Carpet / indoor
- Location: Melbourne, Victoria, Australia

Champions

Singles
- (Australia) Peter McNamara

Doubles
- (Australia) Peter McNamara / (Australia) Paul Kronk
- Melbourne Indoor

The 1981 Miracle Indoor Championships, also known as the Melbourne Indoor Championships, was an Association of Tennis Professionals men's tournament played on indoor carpet courts in the Frankston suburb of Melbourne, Victoria, Australia. It was the second edition of the tournament, which was part of the 1981 Grand Prix tennis circuit, and was held from 19 October until 25 October 1981. First-seeded Peter McNamara won the singles title after his opponent Vitas Gerulaitis defaulted the match at 5–5 in the final set in a protest against what he viewed as bad umpiring and line judging.

== Finals ==
=== Singles ===
(Australia) Peter McNamara defeated (United States) Vitas Gerulaitis 6–4, 1–6, 5–5 def.

- It was McNamara's 2nd singles title of the year and the 4th of his career.

=== Doubles ===
(Australia) Peter McNamara / (Australia) Paul Kronk defeated (United States) Sherwood Stewart / (United States) Ferdi Taygan 3–6, 6–3, 6–4
