= Grand Prix Cleveland =

Defunct tennis tournament
- Tour: World Championship Tennis; USLTA-IPA Indoor Circuit; Grand Prix circuit
- Founded: 1972
- Abolished: 1985
- Editions: 11
- Location: Cleveland, Ohio, United States
- Surface: Hard / outdoor

The Grand Prix Cleveland was a men's tennis tournament played in Cleveland, Ohio, in the United States. The event was part of the World Championship Tennis in 1972 and 1973. The 1976 edition was part of the USLTA-IPA Indoor Circuit. It was part of the Grand Prix circuit from 1978 through 1982 and in 1984 and 1985. It was played on outdoor hard courts. It was titled the Cleveland Tennis Classic in 1972 and 1973, the National Tennis Foundation Open in 1976 International Open in 1978; the Gray International in 1979; the Western Open in 1980 and 1981; the Fazio's Tennis Classic/95th Western Tennis Championships in 1982; the Society Bank Western Open Tennis Championships in 1984; and the Society Bank Tennis Classic in 1985. It was a Challenger-level tournament in 1983.

== Past finals ==
=== Singles ===
Year	Champions	Runners-up	Score
1972	(United Kingdom) Mark Cox	(Australia) Ray Ruffels	6–3, 4–6, 4–6, 6–3, 6–4
1973	(Australia) Ken Rosewall	(United Kingdom) Roger Taylor	6–3, 6–4
1974-1975	Not held		
1976	(Pakistan) Haroon Rahim	(Soviet Union) Alex Metreveli	6–4, 6–4
1977	Not held		
1978	(Austria) Peter Feigl	(United States) Van Winitsky	4–6, 6–3, 6–3
1979	(United States) Stan Smith	(Romania) Ilie Năstase	7–6, 7–5
1980	(United States) Gene Mayer	(United States) Victor Amaya	6–2, 6–1
1981	(United States) Gene Mayer	(United States) Dave Siegler	6–1, 6–4
1982	(United States) Sandy Mayer	(United States) Robert Van't Hof	7–5, 6–3
1983	(United States) Martin Davis	(United States) Matt Mitchell	6–3, 6–2
1984	(United States) Terry Moor	(United States) Martin Davis	3–6, 7–6, 6–2
1985	(United States) Brad Gilbert	(Australia) Brad Drewett	6–3, 6–2

=== Doubles ===
Year	Champions	Runners-up	Score
1972	(Rhodesia) Cliff Drysdale (United Kingdom) Roger Taylor	(United States) Frank Froehling (United States) Charlie Pasarell	7–6, 6–3
1973	(Australia) Ken Rosewall (Australia) Fred Stolle	(Egypt) Ismail El Shafei (New Zealand) Brian Fairlie	6–2, 6–3
1974-1975	Not held		
1978	(United States) Dick Stockton (United States) Erik van Dillen	(United States) Rick Fisher (United States) Bruce Manson	6–1, 6–4
1979	(United States) Robert Lutz (United States) Stan Smith	(Paraguay) Francisco González (United States) Fred McNair	6–3, 6–4
1980	(United States) Victor Amaya (United States) Gene Mayer	(United States) Fred McNair (India) Sashi Menon	6–4, 6–2
1981	(United States) Erik van Dillen (United States) Van Winitsky	(Australia) Syd Ball (Australia) Ross Case	6–4, 5–7, 7–5
1982	(United States) Victor Amaya (United States) Hank Pfister	(United States) Matt Mitchell (United States) Craig Wittus	6–4, 7–6
1983	(South Africa) Mike Myburg (South Africa) Christo van Rensburg	(Paraguay) Francisco González (United States) Matt Mitchell	7–6, 7–5
1984	(Paraguay) Francisco González (United States) Matt Mitchell	(United States) Martin Davis (United States) Chris Dunk	7–6, 7–5
1985	(Finland) Leo Palin (Finland) Olli Rahnasto	(United States) Hank Pfister (United States) Ben Testerman	6–3, 6–7, 7–6
