= Mike Myburg =

South African tennis player

- Country (sports): South Africa
- Born: 23 June 1953 (age 71); Uitenhage, South Africa
- Plays: Right-handed

Singles
- Career record: 9–23
- Career titles: 0
- Highest ranking: No. 159 (2 January 1984)

Grand Slam singles results
- French Open: 3R (1982)
- Wimbledon: 1R (1982)
- US Open: 1R (1982)

Doubles
- Career record: 6–21
- Career titles: 1
- Highest ranking: No. 143 (2 January 1984)

Grand Slam doubles results
- French Open: 1R (1983)
- Wimbledon: 1R (1976, 1983)
- US Open: 1R (1979, 1983)

Mixed doubles

Grand Slam mixed doubles results
- Wimbledon: 1R (1976)

Mike Myburg (born 23 June 1953 in Uitenhage, South Africa) is a former professional tennis player from South Africa. He enjoyed most of his tennis success while playing doubles. During his career, he won one doubles title.

== Career finals ==
=== Doubles: 2 (1–1) ===
Result	W-L	Date	Tournament	Surface	Partner	Opponents	Score
Loss	0–1	Sep 1982	Geneva, Switzerland	Clay	(Australia) Carl Limberger	(Czechoslovakia) Pavel Složil (Czechoslovakia) Tomáš Šmíd	4–6, 0–6
Win	1–1	Aug 1983	Cleveland, U.S.	Hard	(South Africa) Christo van Rensburg	(Paraguay) Francisco González (United States) Matt Mitchell	7–6, 7–5
