= Stewart Bale =

Stewart Bale Ltd was a family run photographic practice specialising in commercial and industrial photography. The firm was based in Liverpool from approximately 1911 through to around the 1980s; an additional London studio operated between 1949 and 1970.

== Background ==
The founder, Herbert Stewart Bale (1859-1929) came to Liverpool from Australia in 1899 and started an advertising agency. He found that it was hard to get good photographs and his son, Edward Stewart Bale (1889 - 1944), began to take photographs for the agency.

The Stewart Bale archive at the Merseyside Maritime Museum's Archives and Library holds some 195,445 negatives (62,845 glass negatives & 132,600 film negatives) principally dating from around 1924 to the early 1980s. The film negatives are currently in frozen storage in order to preserve them and are, therefore, inaccessible. National Museums Liverpool is hoping to digitize this collection with external funding so that it becomes fully accessible and is in the process of planning this project.

== Exhibition ==
There was an exhibition of Stewart Bale images on display at the National Conservation Centre in Liverpool, starting on March 21, 2008, called 'Metropolis: Capturing Modern Liverpool.'
