= 1984 U.S. National Indoor Championships =

- Date: February 6–12
- Edition: 14th
- Category: Grand Prix (Super Series)
- Draw: 48S / 24D
- Prize money: $250,000
- Surface: Carpet / indoor
- Location: Memphis, Tennessee, U.S.
- Venue: Racquet Club of Memphis

Champions

Singles
- (United States) Jimmy Connors

Doubles
- (United States) Peter Fleming / (United States) Fritz Buehning
- U.S. National Indoor Championships

The 1984 U.S. National Indoor Championships was a men's tennis tournament played on indoor carpet courts that was part of the Super Series of the 1984 Volvo Grand Prix. It was played at the Racquet Club of Memphis in Memphis, Tennessee in the United States and held from February 6 through February 12, 1984. First-seeded Jimmy Connors won the singles title and earned $45,000 first-prize money.

== Finals ==
=== Singles ===
(United States) Jimmy Connors defeated (France) Henri Leconte 6–4, 4–6, 7–5

- It was Connors' 1st singles title of the year and the 101st of his career.

=== Doubles ===
(United States) Peter Fleming / (United States) Fritz Buehning defeated (Czechoslovakia) Tomáš Šmíd / (Switzerland) Heinz Günthardt 6–3, 6–0

== See also ==
- 1984 US Indoors – women's tournament
