= 1981 Transamerica Open =

- Date: September 21–27
- Edition: 93rd
- Category: Grand Prix (Super Series)
- Draw: 48S / 24D
- Prize money: $175,000
- Surface: Carpet / indoor
- Location: San Francisco, U.S.
- Venue: Cow Palace

Champions

Singles
- (United States) Eliot Teltscher

Doubles
- (United States) John McEnroe / (United States) Peter Fleming
- Pacific Coast Championships

The 1981 Transamerica Open, also known as the Pacific Coast Championships, was a men's tennis tournament played on indoor carpet courts at the Cow Palace in San Francisco, California in the United States. The event was part of the Super Series of the 1981 Volvo Grand Prix circuit. It was the 93rd edition of the tournament and was held from September 21 through September 27, 1981. Fifth-seeded Eliot Teltscher won the singles title and earned $32,000 first-prize money.

== Finals ==
=== Singles ===
(United States) Eliot Teltscher defeated (United States) Brian Teacher 6–3, 7–6

- It was Teltscher's 2nd singles title of the year and the 6th of his career.

=== Doubles ===
(United States) John McEnroe / (United States) Peter Fleming defeated (Australia) Mark Edmondson / (United States) Sherwood Stewart 7–6, 6–4
