= 1983 Transamerica Open =

- Date: September 19–25
- Edition: 95th
- Category: Grand Prix
- Draw: 32S / 16D
- Prize money: $200,000
- Surface: Carpet / indoor
- Location: San Francisco, U.S.
- Venue: Cow Palace

Champions

Singles
- (Czechoslovakia) Ivan Lendl

Doubles
- (United States) Peter Fleming / (United States) John McEnroe
← 1982 ·	Pacific Coast Championships	· 1984 →

The 1983 Transamerica Open, also known as the Pacific Coast Championships, was a men's tennis tournament played on indoor carpet courts at the Cow Palace in San Francisco, California in the United States. The event was part of the 1983 Volvo Grand Prix circuit. It was the 95th edition of the tournament and was held from September 19 through September 25, 1983. The singles event had a field of 32 players. Second-seeded Ivan Lendl won the singles title.

== Finals ==
=== Singles ===
(Czechoslovakia) Ivan Lendl defeated (United States) John McEnroe 3–6, 7–6^{(7–4)}, 6–4

- It was Lendl's 6th singles title of the year and the 38th of his career.

=== Doubles ===
(United States) Peter Fleming / (United States) John McEnroe defeated (Czechoslovakia) Ivan Lendl / (United States) Vincent Van Patten 6–1, 6–2

== See also ==
- Lendl–McEnroe rivalry
