= 1982 Seiko Hong Kong Classic =

Tennis tournament

- Date: 1–7 November
- Edition: 10th
- Category: Grand Prix
- Draw: 32S / 16D
- Prize money: $100,000 (men) $50,000 (women)
- Surface: Hard / outdoor
- Location: Hong Kong

Champions

Men's singles
- (United States) Pat Du Pré

Women's singles
- (Sweden) Catrin Jexell

Men's doubles
- (United States) Charles Strode / (United States) Morris Strode

Women's doubles
- (United States) Laura duPont / (United States) Alycia Moulton
← 1981 ·	Hong Kong Open	· 1983 →

The 1982 Seiko Hong Kong Classic, also known as the Hong Kong Open, was a combined men's and women's tennis tournament played on outdoor hard courts in Hong Kong that was part of the 1982 Grand Prix tennis circuit. It was the tenth edition of the event and was held from 1 November through 7 November 1982. Unseeded Pat Du Pré won the singles title.

== Finals ==
=== Men's singles ===
(United States) Pat Du Pré defeated (United States) Morris Strode 6–3, 6–3

- It was Du Pré's only singles title of his career.

=== Women's singles ===
(Sweden) Catrin Jexell defeated (United States) Alycia Moulton 6–3, 7–5

- It was Jexell's only singles title of her career.

=== Men's doubles ===
(United States) Charles Strode / (United States) Morris Strode defeated (Australia) Kim Warwick / (United States) Van Winitsky 6–4, 3–6, 6–2

=== Woen's doubles ===
(United States) Laura duPont / (United States) Alycia Moulton defeated (South Africa) Jennifer Mundel / (South Africa) Yvonne Vermaak 6–2, 4–6, 7–5
