= Chris Dunk =

American tennis player (born 1958)

- Country (sports): United States
- Born: January 23, 1958 (age 68) San Francisco, California, US
- Height: 6 ft 4 in (1.93 m)
- Turned pro: 1980
- Plays: Right-handed

Singles
- Career record: 18–32
- Career titles: 0
- Highest ranking: No. 129 (January 4, 1982)

Grand Slam singles results
- Australian Open: 1R (1981)
- Wimbledon: 1R (1981, 1982, 1985)
- US Open: 1R (1982)

Doubles
- Career record: 87–89
- Career titles: 2
- Highest ranking: No. 35 (September 17, 1984)

Grand Slam doubles results
- Australian Open: 1R (1981)
- French Open: QF (1984)
- Wimbledon: QF (1982)
- US Open: 2R (1980, 1986)

Chris Dunk (born January 23, 1958) is a former professional tennis player from the United States.

Dunk did not start playing tournament tennis until the age of 14. Four years later, at 18, he was a top 10 junior in singles and doubles and won the National Junior Hardcourt Doubles title. He attended the University of California, Berkeley in the fall of 1976 on a tennis scholarship. Dunk became a two-time All-American in 1978 and 1980. In his senior year, his university tennis team was ranked #1 in the U.S. after winning the 1980 Collegiate Indoor team title. Dunk and his doubles partner Marty Davis were ranked #1 doubles team in the U.S. during his senior season. Dunk finished his senior year ranked in the top 15 in singles as well. In 2006, in recognition of his success during college, Dunk and Davis were inducted into the University of California at Berkeley Sports Hall of Fame. Dunk turned pro in September 1980 after playing on the U.S Junior Davis Cup Team.

Dunk had numerous singles wins over top 50 players such as Teacher, Nystrom, Arias, Bourne, Frawley, Portes, Davis, Giammalva and others. He enjoyed even more success playing doubles with wins over most every top doubles player on the tour. Playing primarily with his college partner Marty Davis on the tour, he reached the quarterfinals at Wimbledon and the French Open, and he reached five finals and won two ATP doubles titles. In addition, he reached the semifinals of the mixed doubles at the US Open. He achieved a career-high doubles ranking of World No. 35 in 1984. As a doubles team, Dunk and Davis finished #10 on the ATP Grand Prix in 1982. He also recorded 28 doubles titles on the Challenger and Satellite tours throughout the world. He retired from the ATP tour in 1987.

After his tennis career ended, Dunk has gone on to start several successful technology ventures, including CD Communications and Mall Interactive Telecom.

== Career finals ==
=== Doubles:5 (2-3) ===
Result	W/L	Date	Tournament	Surface	Partner	Opponents	Score
Win	1–0	Mar 1981	Mexico City, Mexico	Clay	(United States) Martin Davis	(Australia) John Alexander (Australia) Ross Case	6–3, 6–4
Win	2–0	Nov 1981	Hong Kong	Hard	(United States) Chris Mayotte	(United States) Martin Davis (Australia) Brad Drewett	6–4, 7–6
Loss	2–1	Mar 1982	Brussels, Belgium	Hard (i)	(United States) Tracy Delatte	(Czechoslovakia) Pavel Složil (United States) Sherwood Stewart	4–6, 7–6, 5–7
Loss	2–2	Sep 1982	San Francisco, U.S.	Carpet (i)	(United States) Martin Davis	(United States) Fritz Buehning (United States) Brian Teacher	7–6^{(7–5)}, 2–6, 5–7
Loss	2–3	Aug 1984	Cleveland, U.S.	Hard	(United States) Martin Davis	(Paraguay) Francisco González (United States) Matt Mitchell	6–7, 5–7
