= 1980 Seiko Hong Kong Classic =

Tennis tournament

- Date: 3–9 November
- Edition: 8th
- Category: Grand Prix
- Draw: 32S / 16D
- Prize money: $75,000
- Surface: Hard / outdoor
- Location: Hong Kong

Champions

Singles
- (Czechoslovakia) Ivan Lendl

Doubles
- (United States) Ferdi Taygan / (United States) Peter Fleming
- Hong Kong Open

The 1980 Seiko Hong Kong Classic, also known as the Hong Kong Open, was a men's tennis tournament played on outdoor hard courts in Hong Kong that was part of the 1980 Grand Prix tennis circuit. It was the eighth edition of the event and was held from 3 November through 19 November 1980. Second-seeded Ivan Lendl won the singles title.

== Finals ==
=== Singles ===
(Czechoslovakia) Ivan Lendl defeated (United States) Brian Teacher 5–7, 7–6^{(7–2)}, 6–3

- It was Lendl's 6th singles title of the year and of his career.

=== Doubles ===
(United States) Ferdi Taygan / (United States) Peter Fleming defeated (United States) Bruce Manson / (United States) Brian Teacher 7–5, 6–2
