= Pat Cash =

Australian tennis player (born 1965)

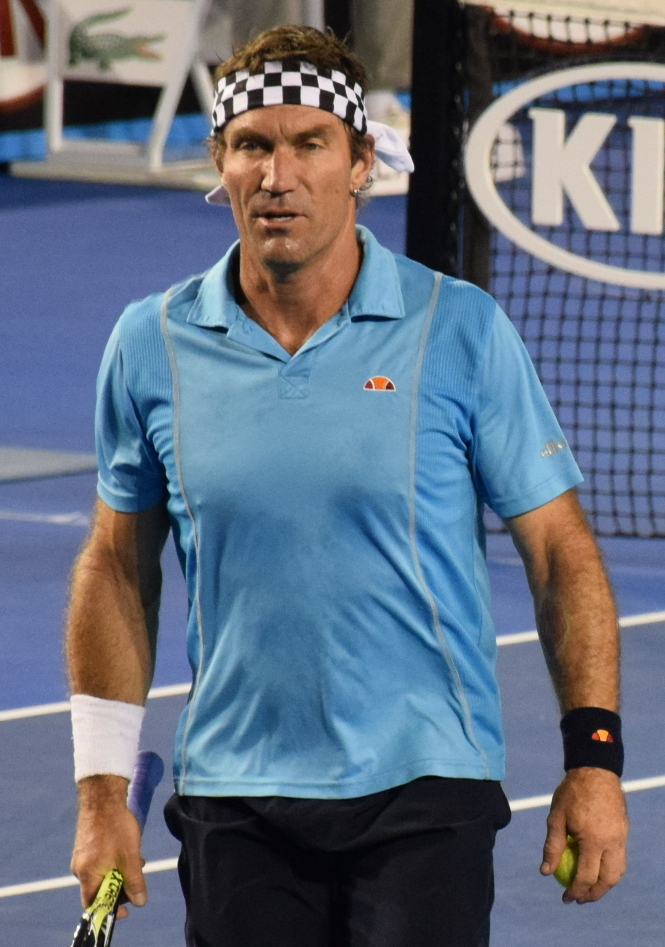
- Cash at the 2015 Australian Open
- Country (sports): Australia
- Residence: London, England
- Born: 27 May 1965 (age 61) Melbourne, Australia
- Height: 1.83 m (6 ft 0 in)
- Turned pro: 1982
- Retired: 1997 (singles); 2006 (doubles)
- Plays: Right-handed (one-handed backhand)
- Prize money: US$1,950, 345

Singles
- Career record: 238–148 (61.7%)
- Career titles: 6
- Highest ranking: No. 4 (9 May 1988)

Grand Slam singles results
- Australian Open: F (1987, 1988)
- French Open: 4R (1988)
- Wimbledon: W (1987)
- US Open: SF (1984)

Other tournaments
- Tour Finals: RR (1987)
- WCT Finals: QF (1988)
- Olympic Games: 1R (1984, demonstration event)

Doubles
- Career record: 174–110 (61.3%)
- Career titles: 12
- Highest ranking: No. 6 (13 August 1984)

Grand Slam doubles results
- Australian Open: SF (1984)
- French Open: 3R (1982)
- Wimbledon: F (1984, 1985)
- US Open: SF (1983)

Team competitions
- Davis Cup: W (1983, 1986)
- Hopman Cup: F (1989)

Patrick Hart Cash (born 27 May 1965) is an Australian former professional tennis player and coach. He reached a career-high ATP singles ranking of world No. 4 in May 1988 and a career-high ATP doubles ranking of world No. 6 in August 1988. Upon winning the 1987 singles title at Wimbledon, Cash climbed into the stands to celebrate, starting a tradition that has continued ever since.

== Early life ==
Cash is the son of Pat Cash Sr., who played for the Hawthorn Football Club in the 1950s. He grew up in Melbourne and was educated at Marcellin College and Whitefriars College.

== Career ==
=== Junior years ===
Cash came to the tennis world's attention as a prominent and promising junior player in the early 1980s. He was awarded a scholarship at the Australian Institute of Sport. He was ranked the No. 1 junior player in the world in 1981.

In June 1982, Cash won the junior doubles title at the French Open partnering John Frawley. In July he won the junior singles title at Wimbledon, and while partnering Frawley, he also won the junior doubles title at the same tournament. In September, he won the junior singles title at the US Open, and while partnering Frawley, he was also the runner-up of the junior doubles at the same tournament.

=== Professional years ===
Cash turned professional in late 1982 and won his first top-level singles title that year in Melbourne.

In 1983, Cash became the youngest player to play in a Davis Cup final. He won the decisive singles rubber against Joakim Nyström as Australia defeated Sweden 3–2 to claim the cup.

In 1984, Cash reached the singles semifinals at both Wimbledon and the US Open, beating Mats Wilander in both. He lost in three sets in the Wimbledon semifinals to John McEnroe and was defeated in the semifinals at the US Open by Ivan Lendl, who won their match in a fifth-set tiebreaker after saving a match point. This day is regarded as one of the greatest days in US Open history because it featured the three set thriller women's final Chris Evert vs Martina Navratilova and a John McEnroe vs Jimmy Connors five set marathon semifinal – creating the day now known as 'Super Saturday'. Cash finished the year in top 10 for the first time.

Cash was the runner-up in the doubles competition at Wimbledon in both 1984 with Paul McNamee and 1985 with John Fitzgerald.

In 1986, just prior to Wimbledon, Cash had an emergency appendix operation. He reached the quarterfinals, playing "breath-taking tennis" to beat Mats Wilander in the fourth round in only his sixth match (excluding 1986 World Team Cup) in 12 months. During the championship he started the now common tradition of throwing wristbands and headbands into the crowd. Cash helped Australia regain the Davis Cup with a 3–2 victory over Sweden in the final, where he beat Stefan Edberg and then won the decisive singles rubber, recovering from two sets down against Mikael Pernfors. Cash was unbeaten in singles throughout the 1986 Davis Cup competition, having beaten Britain's Jeremy Bates and Andrew Castle in the quarter finals and America's Tim Mayotte and Brad Gilbert in the semi finals (in the first round he played doubles only).

1987 was a particularly strong year for Cash. He reached five singles finals, of which two were Grand Slam finals. Cash reached his first Grand Slam singles final at the Australian Open, beating Ivan Lendl in a four hour, four set semi final. He lost the final in five sets to Stefan Edberg. This was the last Australian Open played at Kooyong on a grass court. The crowning moment of Cash's career came in 1987 at Wimbledon. Having already beaten Marcel Freeman, Paul McNamee, Michiel Schapers, Guy Forget, Mats Wilander in the quarterfinals and Jimmy Connors in the semifinals, Cash defeated the world No. 1, Ivan Lendl, in the final in straight sets. Cash sealed the victory by climbing into the stands and up to the player's box at Centre Court, where he celebrated with his family, girlfriend, and coach, Ian Barclay. He thus started a Wimbledon tradition that has been followed by many other champions at Wimbledon and other Grand Slam tournaments since. He only dropped one set during the entire tournament. He finished the year ranked at No. 7.

Cash won the 1987 South African Open, having chosen to play in the tournament to earn enough ATP points to guarantee a spot in the Masters later that year. His participation, against the background of boycotts, was criticised by the Australian Anti-Apartheid Movement, which went on to protest his subsequent matches in Australia.

In 1988, Cash reached the Australian Open final for the second consecutive year, beating Ivan Lendl in five sets in the semis, as Lendl struggled in the latter stages due to heat and Cash repeated his tactics of the 1987 Wimbledon final. He faced Mats Wilander in the final. It was the first men's singles final played at the new Melbourne Park venue on hard court, and Wilander won in a four-and-a-half-hour encounter, taking the fifth set 8–6. There were two rain delays during the final but the roof was not closed after controversy the previous day when it was closed for the women's final. Cash also reached his career-high ranking of world No. 4 in May.

Coming in as the defending champion in 1988 at Wimbledon, Cash was seeded fourth and only dropped two sets (both during the second round) en route to the quarterfinals, but his run came to an end when he lost to sixth seed and eventual runner-up Boris Becker. It was the last time he reached the quarterfinals at a Grand Slam tournament in singles. He withdrew from the US Open with Achilles tendon and back issues. 1988 was the last time Cash ended the year in the top 20, finishing the year ranked 20th, after having been ranked inside the top 10 from the start of the year until 21 November.

In April 1989, Cash ruptured his Achilles tendon at the Japan Open and was out of action until March 1990.

Cash played in his third Davis Cup final in 1990. This time, Australia lost 2–3 to the United States.

Cash continued to play on the circuit on-and-off through the mid-1990s. A series of consecutive injuries to his Achilles tendon, knees, and back prevented him from recapturing his best form after winning Wimbledon in 1987. He won his last top-level singles title in April 1990 at the Hong Kong Open. His last doubles title came in 1996 at the U.S. Men's Clay Court Championships with Pat Rafter.

Cash established a reputation on the tour as a hard-fighting serve-and-volleyer and for wearing his trademark black-and-white checked headband and his cross earring. For most of his career, Cash was coached by Melbourne-born tennis coach Ian Barclay.

=== Post-retirement ===
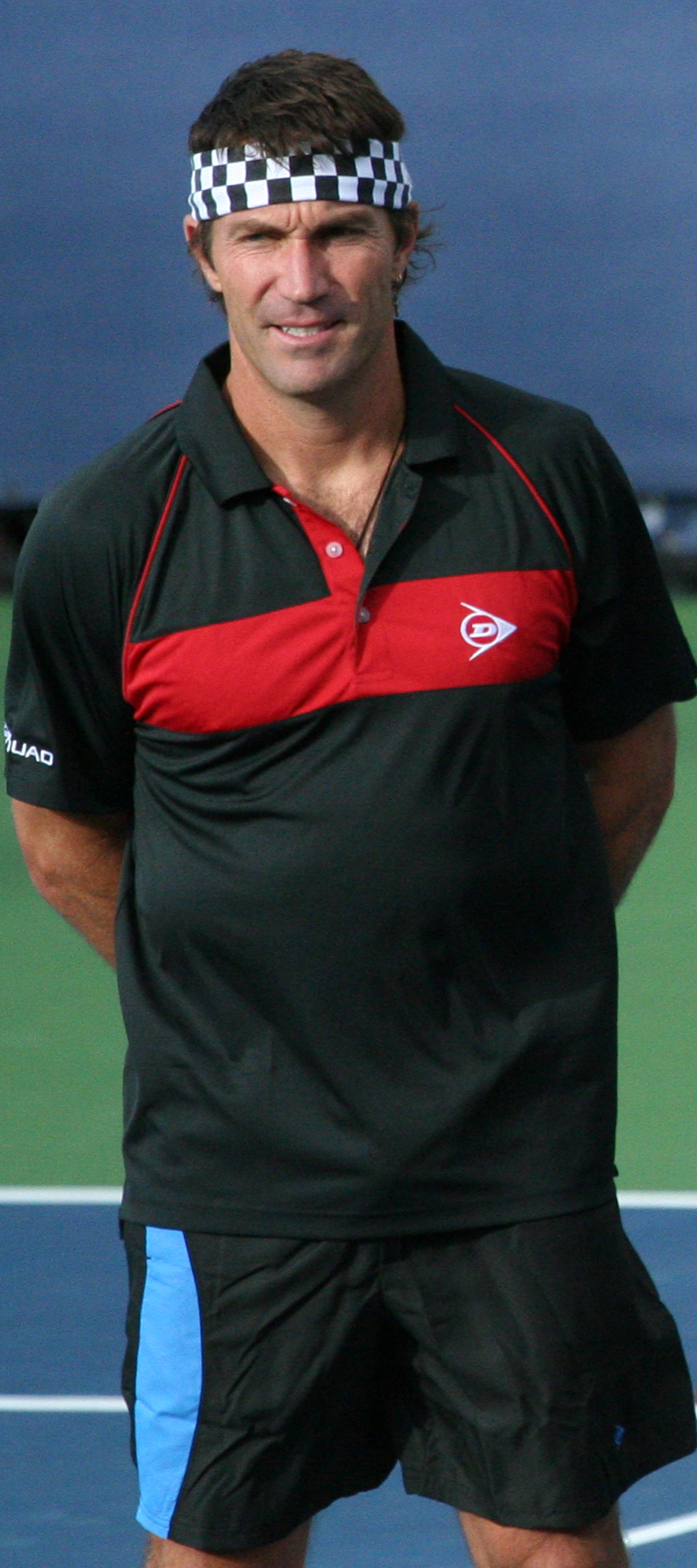
Cash in 2010

Since his retirement from the tour in 1997, Cash has resided mainly in London. He is the host of CNN's tennis-focused magazine show Open Court, and has also worked as a TV co-commentator, primarily for the BBC. Cash continues to be a draw card on both the ATP and Champions Cup legends tours. He won the Hall of Fame event in Newport Rhode Island in 2008 and 2009. He has coached top players including Greg Rusedski, CoCo Vandeweghe and Mark Philippoussis.

Cash opened a tennis academy on the Gold Coast of Australia and is also opening academies in Ko Samui, Thailand and in the Caribbean St Vincent, St Lucia and Dominican Republic.

Cash was inducted into the Sport Australia Hall of Fame in 2005.

Cash won the over-45s Wimbledon doubles title with fellow Australian Mark Woodforde in 2010, 2011, 2012 and 2013. In November 2014, he played in the inaugural Champions Tennis League in India.

In 2022, Cash appeared on the third British series of The Masked Singer masked as "Bagpipes". He was fourth to be unmasked.

== Personal life ==
In his early twenties, Cash had two children with his then-girlfriend, Norwegian model Anne-Britt Kristiansen. They have a son and a daughter. From 1990 through 2002 Cash was married to Brazilian Emily Bendit. They have twin boys. In 2010, Cash became a grandfather at age 45 when his daughter gave birth to a daughter.

Cash was criticised for stating in an August 2021 interview with The Conservative Woman, broadcast online, that he had been taking Ivermectin for more than 15 months, claiming that "I'm living proof that I have been in the worst areas everywhere around the world and I haven't come close to getting COVID", despite the lack of evidence for the safety or efficacy of the drug for such measures. Cash and former American surfer Kelly Slater were labelled "cookers" (conspiracy theorists) after they exchanged views on Twitter about the concept of the 15-minute city in February 2023.

== Grand Slam finals ==
=== Singles: 3 (1 title, 2 runner-ups) ===
| Result | Year | Championship | Surface | Opponent | Score |
|---|---|---|---|---|---|
| Loss | 1987 | Australian Open | Grass | (Sweden) Stefan Edberg | 3–6, 4–6, 6–3, 7–5, 3–6 |
| Win | 1987 | Wimbledon | Grass | (Czechoslovakia) Ivan Lendl | 7–6^{(7–5)}, 6–2, 7–5 |
| Loss | 1988 | Australian Open | Hard | (Sweden) Mats Wilander | 3–6, 7–6^{(7–3)}, 6–3, 1–6, 6–8 |

=== Doubles (2 runner-ups) ===
| Result | Year | Championship | Surface | Partner | Opponents | Score |
|---|---|---|---|---|---|---|
| Loss | 1984 | Wimbledon | Grass | (Australia) Paul McNamee | (United States) Peter Fleming (United States) John McEnroe | 2–6, 7–5, 2–6, 6–3, 3–6 |
| Loss | 1985 | Wimbledon | Grass | (Australia) John Fitzgerald | (Switzerland) Heinz Günthardt (Hungary) Balázs Taróczy | 4–6, 3–6, 6–4, 3–6 |

== ATP career finals ==
=== Singles: 11 (6 titles, 5 runner-ups) ===
Legend
Grand Slam (1–2)
Year-end championship (0–0)
Grand Prix Super series (0–0)
Grand Prix Championship series (0–0)
Grand Prix Tour (5–3)

| Result | W-L | Date | Tournament | Surface | Opponent | Score |
|---|---|---|---|---|---|---|
| Win | 1–0 | Dec 1982 | Melbourne Outdoor, Australia | Grass | (Australia) Rod Frawley | 6–4, 7–6 |
| Win | 2–0 | Oct 1983 | Brisbane, Australia | Carpet (i) | (Australia) Paul McNamee | 4–6, 6–4, 6–3 |
| Loss | 2–1 | Oct 1984 | Melbourne Indoor, Australia | Carpet (i) | (United States) Matt Mitchell | 4–6, 6–3, 2–6 |
| Loss | 2–2 | Jan 1987 | Australian Open, Melbourne | Grass | (Sweden) Stefan Edberg | 3–6, 4–6, 6–3, 7–5, 3–6 |
| Win | 3–2 | Mar 1987 | Lorraine Open, France | Carpet (i) | (Australia) Wally Masur | 6–2, 6–3 |
| Win | 4–2 | Jun 1987 | Wimbledon | Grass | (Czechoslovakia) Ivan Lendl | 7–6^{(7–5)}, 6–2, 7–5 |
| Loss | 4–3 | Oct 1987 | Australian Indoor Championships | Hard (i) | (Czech Republic) Ivan Lendl | 4–6, 2–6, 4–6 |
| Win | 5–3 | Nov 1987 | South African Open | Hard (i) | (United States) Brad Gilbert | 7–6^{(9–7)}, 4–6, 2–6, 6–0, 6–1 |
| Loss | 5–4 | Jan 1988 | Australian Open, Melbourne | Hard | (Sweden) Mats Wilander | 3–6, 7–6^{(7–3)}, 6–3, 1–6, 6–8 |
| Loss | 5–5 | Apr 1990 | Seoul Open, South Korea | Hard | (Austria) Alex Antonitsch | 6–7^{(2–7)}, 3–6 |
| Win | 6–5 | Apr 1990 | Hong Kong | Hard | (Austria) Alex Antonitsch | 6–3, 6–4 |

=== Doubles (11 titles, 6 runner-ups) ===
Legend
Grand Slam (0–2)
Year-end championship (0–0)
Grand Prix Super series (1–0)
Grand Prix Championship series (0–0)
Grand Prix Tour (11–4)

| Result | W-L | Date | Tournament | Surface | Partner | Opponents | Score |
|---|---|---|---|---|---|---|---|
| Win | 1–0 | Dec 1982 | Adelaide, Australia | Grass | (Australia) Chris Johnstone | (Australia) Broderick Dyke (Australia) Wayne Hampson | 6–3, 6–7, 7–6 |
| Loss | 1–1 | Jun 1985 | London/Queen's Club, UK | Grass | (Australia) John Fitzgerald | (United States) Ken Flach (United States) Robert Seguso | 6–3, 3–6, 14–16 |
| Loss | 1–2 | Jul 1985 | Wimbledon, London | Grass | (Australia) John Fitzgerald | (Switzerland) Heinz Günthardt (Hungary) Balázs Taróczy | 4–6, 3–6, 6–4, 3–6 |
| Win | 2–2 | Oct 1983 | Brisbane, Australia | Carpet | (Australia) Paul McNamee | (Australia) Mark Edmondson (Australia) Kim Warwick | 7–6, 7–6 |
| Win | 3–2 | Dec 1983 | Sydney, Australia | Grass | (United States) Mike Bauer | (Australia) Broderick Dyke (Australia) Rod Frawley | 7–6, 6–4 |
| Win | 4–2 | Apr 1984 | Houston, US | Clay | (Australia) Paul McNamee | (United States) David Dowlen (Nigeria) Nduka Odizor | 7–5, 4–6, 6–3 |
| Win | 5–2 | Apr 1984 | Aix-en-Provence, France | Clay | (Australia) Paul McNamee | (New Zealand) Chris Lewis (Australia) Wally Masur | 4–6, 6–3, 6–4 |
| Win | 6–2 | Jun 1984 | London/Queen's Club, UK | Grass | (Australia) Paul McNamee | (South Africa) Bernard Mitton (United States) Butch Walts | 6–4, 6–3 |
| Loss | 6–3 | Jul 1984 | Wimbledon, London | Grass | (Australia) Paul McNamee | (United States) Peter Fleming (United States) John McEnroe | 2–6, 7–5, 2–6, 6–3, 3–6 |
| Win | 7–3 | May 1985 | Las Vegas, US | Hard | (Australia) John Fitzgerald | (United States) Paul Annacone (South Africa) Christo van Rensburg | 7–6, 6–7, 7–6 |
| Loss | 7–4 | Nov 1986 | Hong Kong, Hong Kong | Hard | (Australia) Mark Kratzmann | (United States) Mike De Palmer (United States) Gary Donnelly | 6–7, 7–6, 5–7 |
| Loss | 7–5 | Nov 1986 | Stockholm, Sweden | Hard | (Socialist Federal Republic of Yugoslavia) Slobodan Živojinović | (United States) Sherwood Stewart (United States) Kim Warwick | 4–6, 4–6 |
| Win | 8–5 | Aug 1987 | Montreal, Canada | Hard | (Sweden) Stefan Edberg | (Australia) Peter Doohan (Australia) Laurie Warder | 6–7, 6–3, 6–4 |
| Win | 9–5 | Jan 1990 | Sydney, Australia | Hard | (Australia) Mark Kratzmann | (South Africa) Pieter Aldrich (South Africa) Danie Visser | 6–4, 7–5 |
| Win | 10–5 | Apr 1990 | Hong Kong, Hong Kong | Hard | (Australia) Wally Masur | (United States) Kevin Curren (South Africa) Joey Rive | 6–3, 6–3 |
| Loss | 10–6 | Apr 1996 | Bermuda | Clay | (Australia) Pat Rafter | (Sweden) Jan Apell (South Africa) Brent Haygarth | 6–3, 1–6, 3–6 |
| Win | 11–6 | May 1996 | Pinehurst, US | Clay | (Australia) Pat Rafter | (United States) Ken Flach (United States) David Wheaton | 6–2, 6–3 |

== Junior Grand Slam finals ==
=== Boys' singles: 3 (2–1) ===
| Result | Year | Championship | Surface | Opponent | Score |
|---|---|---|---|---|---|
| Loss | 1981 | Wimbledon Jrs. | Grass | (United States) Matt Anger | 6–7^{(3–7)}, 5–7 |
| Win | 1982 | Wimbledon Jrs. | Grass | (Sweden) Henrik Sundström | 6–4, 6–7^{(5–7)}, 6–3 |
| Win | 1982 | US Open Jrs. | Hard | (France) Guy Forget | 6–3, 6–3 |

== Performance timelines ==
=== Singles ===
Key
| W | F | SF | QF | #R | RR | Q# | P# | DNQ | A | Z# | PO | G | S | B | NMS | NTI | P | NH |

(W) winner; (F) finalist; (SF) semifinalist; (QF) quarterfinalist; (#R) rounds 4, 3, 2, 1; (RR) round-robin stage; (Q#) qualification round; (P#) preliminary round; (DNQ) did not qualify; (A) absent; (Z#) Davis/Fed Cup Zonal Group (with number indication) or (PO) play-off; (G) gold, (S) silver or (B) bronze Olympic/Paralympic medal; (NMS) not a Masters tournament; (NTI) not a Tier I tournament; (P) postponed; (NH) not held; (SR) strike rate (events won / competed); (W–L) win–loss record.

Walkovers are neither official wins nor official losses.

| Tournament | 1981 | 1982 | 1983 | 1984 | 1985 | 1986 | 1987 | 1988 | 1989 | 1990 | 1991 | 1992 | 1993 | 1994 | 1995 | 1996 | 1997 | SR | W–L |
|---|---|---|---|---|---|---|---|---|---|---|---|---|---|---|---|---|---|---|---|
Grand Slam tournaments
| Australian Open | 1R | QF | 4R | QF | A | NH | F | F | 4R | A | 3R | 2R | A | A | 1R | A | 1R | 0 / 11 | 26–11 |
| French Open | A | A | 1R | 1R | A | A | 1R | 4R | A | A | 2R | A | A | A | A | A | A | 0 / 5 | 4–5 |
| Wimbledon | A | A | 4R | SF | 2R | QF | W | QF | A | 4R | 2R | 2R | A | A | 1R | A | 1R | 1 / 11 | 29–10 |
| US Open | A | 1R | 3R | SF | A | 1R | 1R | A | A | 3R | A | A | A | A | A | 1R | A | 0 / 7 | 9–7 |
| Win–loss | 0–1 | 3–2 | 8–4 | 13–4 | 1–1 | 4–2 | 12–3 | 13–3 | 3–1 | 5–2 | 4–3 | 2–2 | 0–0 | 0–0 | 0–2 | 0–1 | 0–2 | 1 / 34 | 68–33 |
| Year-end ranking | – | 342 | 34 | 10 | 67 | 24 | 7 | 20 | 368 | 81 | 108 | 203 | – | 511 | 250 | 765 | 379 | | |
National representation
| Davis Cup | A | A | W | SF | SF | W | SF | QF | PO | F | A | A | A | A | A | A | A | 2 / 8 | 23–7 |

== Top 10 wins ==
| Season | 1981 | 1982 | 1983 | 1984 | 1985 | 1986 | 1987 | 1988 | 1989 | 1990 | 1991 | 1992 | 1993 | 1994 | 1995 | 1996 | 1997 | Total |
| Wins | 0 | 0 | 1 | 4 | 0 | 2 | 8 | 1 | 0 | 0 | 0 | 0 | 0 | 0 | 0 | 0 | 0 | 16 |

| # | Player | Rank | Event | Surface | Rd | Score | Cash rank |
1983
| 1. | (United States) Vitas Gerulaitis | 9 | Queen's Club, London | Grass | 2R | 5–7, 6–3, 6–3 | 61 |
1984
| 2. | (Sweden) Mats Wilander | 4 | Wimbledon, London | Grass | 2R | 6–7^{(2–7)}, 6–4, 6–2, 6–4 | 33 |
| 3. | (Ecuador) Andrés Gómez | 6 | Wimbledon, London | Grass | QF | 6–4, 6–4, 6–7^{(3–7)}, 7–6^{(7–5)} | 33 |
| 4. | (Sweden) Mats Wilander | 4 | US Open, New York | Hard | QF | 7–6^{(7–3)}, 6–4, 2–6, 6–3 | 18 |
| 5. | (United States) Jimmy Connors | 2 | Davis Cup, Portland U.S. | Carpet (i) | RR | 6–4, 6–2 | 10 |
1986
| 6. | (Sweden) Mats Wilander | 2 | Wimbledon, London | Grass | 4R | 4–6, 7–5, 6–4, 6–3 | 413 |
| 7. | (Sweden) Stefan Edberg | 5 | Davis Cup, Melbourne | Grass | RR | 13–11, 13–11, 6–4 | 24 |
1987
| 8. | (France) Yannick Noah | 4 | Australian Open, Melbourne | Grass | QF | 6–4, 6–2, 2–6, 6–0 | 24 |
| 9. | (Czechoslovakia) Ivan Lendl | 1 | Australian Open, Melbourne | Grass | SF | 7–6^{(7–1)}, 5–7, 7–6^{(7–5)}, 6–4 | 24 |
| 10. | (Sweden) Stefan Edberg | 4 | Queen's Club, London | Grass | QF | 7–6, 7–6 | 13 |
| 11. | (Sweden) Mats Wilander | 3 | Wimbledon, London | Grass | QF | 6–3, 7–5, 6–4 | 11 |
| 12. | (United States) Jimmy Connors | 7 | Wimbledon, London | Grass | SF | 6–4, 6–4, 6–1 | 11 |
| 13. | (Czechoslovakia) Ivan Lendl | 1 | Wimbledon, London | Grass | F | 7–6^{(7–5)}, 6–2, 7–5 | 11 |
| 14. | (West Germany) Boris Becker | 4 | Sydney, Australia | Hard (i) | SF | 6–3, 2–6, 7–6 | 8 |
| 15. | (Czechoslovakia) Miloslav Mečíř | 6 | Masters, New York | Carpet (i) | RR | 7–5, 6–4 | 7 |
1988
| 16. | (Czechoslovakia) Ivan Lendl | 1 | Australian Open, Melbourne | Hard | SF | 6–4, 2–6, 6–2, 4–6, 6–2 | 7 |

== Senior Tour titles ==
- 2000 – London Masters, UK (Blackrock Tour of Champions)
- 2001 – Graz, Austria (Blackrock Tour of Champions)
