= GWA Mazda Tennis Classic =

Australian tennis tournament

Defunct tennis tournament
- Tour: Grand Prix circuit
- Founded: 1983
- Abolished: 1985
- Editions: 3
- Location: Brisbane, Australia
- Surface: Carpet / indoor

The GWA Mazda Tennis Classic was a men's tennis tournament played in Brisbane, Australia, from 1983 to 1985. The event was part of the Grand Prix tennis circuit and was held on indoor carpet courts.

== Finals ==
=== Singles ===
| Year | Champions | Runners-up | Score |
|---|---|---|---|
| 1983 | (Australia) Pat Cash | (Australia) Paul McNamee | 4–6, 6–4, 6–3 |
| 1984 | (United States) Eliot Teltscher | (Paraguay) Francisco González | 3–6, 6–4, 6–4 |
| 1985 | (United States) Paul Annacone | (New Zealand) Kelly Evernden | 6–3, 6–3 |

=== Doubles ===
| Year | Champions | Runners-up | Score |
|---|---|---|---|
| 1983 | (Australia) Pat Cash (Australia) Paul McNamee | (Australia) Mark Edmondson (Australia) Kim Warwick | 7–6, 7–6 |
| 1984 | (Paraguay) Francisco González (United States) Matt Mitchell | (Australia) Broderick Dyke (Australia) Wally Masur | 6–7, 6–2, 7–5 |
| 1985 | (United States) Marty Davis (Australia) Brad Drewett | (United States) Bud Schultz (United States) Ben Testerman | 6–2, 6–2 |
