= Melbourne Indoor =

Australian men's tennis tournament from 1980 to 1985

Defunct tennis tournament
- Tour: Grand Prix circuit
- Founded: 1980
- Abolished: 1985
- Editions: 5
- Location: Melbourne, Australia
- Venue: Festival Hall (1982–1985)
- Surface: Carpet / indoor (1982–1985); Hard / indoor (1980-1981)

The Melbourne Indoor was a men's tennis tournament played in Melbourne, Australia, from 1980 through 1985. The event was part of the Grand Prix tennis circuit and was played on indoor carpet courts.

== Finals ==
=== Singles ===
Year	Champions	Runners-up	Score
1980	(United States) Vitas Gerulaitis	(Australia) Peter McNamara	7–5, 6–3
1981	(Australia) Peter McNamara	(United States) Vitas Gerulaitis	6–4, 1–6, 7–5
1982	(United States) Vitas Gerulaitis	(United States) Eliot Teltscher	2–6, 6–2, 6–2
1983	Not held		
1984	(United States) Matt Mitchell	(Australia) Pat Cash	6–4, 3–6, 6–2
1985	(United States) Marty Davis	(United States) Paul Annacone	6–4, 6–4

=== Doubles ===
Year	Champions	Runners-up	Score
1980	(United States) Fritz Buehning (United States) Ferdi Taygan	(United States) John Sadri (United States) Tim Wilkison	6–1, 6–2
1981	(Australia) Paul Kronk (Australia) Peter McNamara	(United States) Sherwood Stewart (United States) Ferdi Taygan	3–6, 6–3, 6–4
1982	(Paraguay) Francisco González (United States) Matt Mitchell	(Australia) Syd Ball (Australia) Rod Frawley	7–6, 7–6
1983	Not held		
1984	(Australia) Broderick Dyke (Australia) Wally Masur	(Australia) Peter Johnston (Australia) John McCurdy	6–3, 6–2
1985	(Australia) Brad Drewett (United States) Matt Mitchell	(United States) David Dowlen (Nigeria) Nduka Odizor	4–6, 7–6, 6–4
