= Fritz Buehning =

American tennis player

- Country (sports): United States
- Born: March 5, 1960 (age 66) Summit, New Jersey
- Height: 1.96 m (6 ft 5 in)
- Turned pro: 1972
- Retired: 1986
- Plays: Right-handed
- Prize money: $608,506

Singles
- Career record: 113–120
- Career titles: 1
- Highest ranking: No. 21 (23 November 1981)

Grand Slam singles results
- Australian Open: 2R (1983)
- French Open: 2R (1980)
- Wimbledon: 3R (1981)
- US Open: 3R (1982)

Doubles
- Career record: 205–121
- Career titles: 12
- Highest ranking: No. 4 (19 September 1983)

Grand Slam doubles results
- Australian Open: QF (1982)
- Wimbledon: QF (1981)
- US Open: F (1983)

Fritz Buehning (born March 5, 1960) is an American former tennis player.

Born in Summit, New Jersey, Buehning grew up in Millburn, New Jersey and attended Millburn High School, where he won the New Jersey state individual tennis championship in 1977 as a junior, his final year in high school. He attended University of California, Los Angeles, where he was recognized as Pac-10 Player of the Year and an All-American and was part of a tennis team that won the NCAA championship.

Buehning achieved top rankings of No. 21 in singles and No. 4 in doubles, ending his career as a result of a foot injury after five seasons on the tour. On professional tournaments, he won one singles title and 12 doubles titles. Partnered with Van Winitsky, he lost the 1983 US Open finals to the team of Peter Fleming and John McEnroe.

== Career finals ==
=== Singles: 2 (1 title, 2 runner-ups) ===
Result	W-L	Date	Tournament	Surface	Opponent	Score
Loss	0–1	Dec 1980	Johannesburg, South Africa	Hard	(New Zealand) Kim Warwick	2–6, 1–6, 2–6
Win	1–1	Dec 1980	Sydney, Australia	Hard	(United States) Brian Teacher	6–3, 6–7, 7–6
Loss	1–2	Feb 1982	Richmond, US	Carpet (i)	(Argentina) José Luis Clerc	6–3, 3–6, 4–6, 3–6

=== Doubles: 27 (12 titles, 15 runner-ups) ===
Result	W-L	Date	Tournament	Surface	Partner	Opponents	Score
Loss	0–1	Aug 1979	South Orange, US	Clay	(United States) Bruce Nichols	(United States) Peter Fleming (United States) John McEnroe	1–6, 3–6
Loss	0–2	Nov 1979	Bologna, Italy	Carpet (i)	(United States) Ferdi Taygan	(United States) Peter Fleming (United States) John McEnroe	1–6, 1–6
Win	1–2	Feb 1980	Richmond, US	Carpet (i)	(South Africa) Johan Kriek	(United States) Brian Gottfried (South Africa) Frew McMillan	3–6, 6–3, 7–6
Loss	1–3	Mar 1980	Dayton, US	Carpet (i)	(United States) Fred McNair	(Poland) Wojciech Fibak (Australia) Geoff Masters	4–6, 4–6
Win	2–3	May 1980	São Paulo, Brazil	Carpet	(India) Anand Amritraj	(Australia) David Carter (New Zealand) Chris Lewis	7–6, 6–2
Loss	2–4	Jul 1980	Newport, US	Grass	(United States) Peter Rennert	(Zimbabwe) Andrew Pattison (United States) Butch Walts	6–7, 4–6
Loss	2–5	Aug 1980	South Orange, US	Clay	(United States) Van Winitsky	(United States) Bill Maze (United States) John McEnroe	6–7, 4–6
Win	3–5	Oct 1980	Melbourne, Australia	Carpet (i)	(United States) Ferdi Taygan	(United States) John Sadri (United States) Tim Wilkison	6–1, 6–2
Win	4–5	Mar 1981	Rotterdam, Netherlands	Carpet (i)	(United States) Ferdi Taygan	(United States) Gene Mayer (United States) Sandy Mayer	7–6, 1–6, 6–4
Win	5–5	Aug 1981	South Orange, US	Hard	(Zimbabwe) Andrew Pattison	(Israel) Shlomo Glickstein (Israel) David Schneider	6–1, 6–4
Win	6–5	Aug 1981	Atlanta, US	Hard	(United States) Peter Fleming	(United States) Sammy Giammalva Jr. (United States) Tony Giammalva	6–4, 4–6, 6–3
Loss	6–6	Nov 1981	Johannesburg, South Africa	Hard	(New Zealand) Russell Simpson	(United States) Terry Moor (South Africa) John Yuill	3–6, 7–5, 4–6, 7–6, 10–12
Loss	6–7	Mar 1982	Rotterdam, Netherlands	Carpet (i)	(South Africa) Kevin Curren	(Australia) Mark Edmondson (United States) Sherwood Stewart	5–7, 2–6
Win	7–7	Aug 1982	La Costa WCT, US	Carpet (i)	(United States) Johan Kriek	(United States) Bob Lutz (Mexico) Raúl Ramírez	3–6, 7–6, 6–3
Win	8–7	Sep 1982	San Francisco, US	Carpet (i)	(United States) Brian Teacher	(United States) Martin Davis (Australia) Chris Dunk	6–7, 6–2, 7–5
Loss	8–8	Oct 1982	Basel, Switzerland	Carpet (i)	(Czechoslovakia) Pavel Složil	(France) Henri Leconte (France) Yannick Noah	2–6, 2–6
Win	9–8	Oct 1982	Amsterdam, Netherlands	Carpet (i)	(Czechoslovakia) Tomáš Šmíd	(South Africa) Kevin Curren (United Kingdom) Buster Mottram	4–6, 6–3, 6–0
Loss	9–9	Feb 1983	Richmond WCT, US	Carpet (i)	(United States) Brian Teacher	(Czechoslovakia) Pavel Složil (Czechoslovakia) Tomáš Šmíd	2–6, 4–6
Win	10–9	Mar 1983	Rotterdam, Netherlands	Carpet (i)	(United States) Tom Gullikson	(United States) Peter Fleming (Czechoslovakia) Pavel Složil	7–6, 4–6, 7–6
Loss	10–10	Mar 1983	Milan, Italy	Carpet (i)	(United States) Peter Fleming	(Czechoslovakia) Pavel Složil (Czechoslovakia) Tomáš Šmíd	2–6, 7–5, 4–6
Win	11–10	Jul 1983	South Orange, US	Clay	(United States) Tom Cain	(United Kingdom) John Lloyd (United States) Dick Stockton	6–2, 7–5
Loss	11–11	Aug 1983	Stowe, US	Hard	(United States) Tom Gullikson	(Australia) Brad Drewett (Australia) Kim Warwick	6–4, 5–7, 2–6
Loss	11–12	Sep 1983	US Open, New York	Hard	(United States) Van Winitsky	(United States) Peter Fleming (United States) John McEnroe	3–6, 4–6, 2–6
Win	12–12	Feb 1984	Memphis, US	Carpet (i)	(United States) Peter Fleming	(Switzerland) Heinz Günthardt (Czechoslovakia) Tomáš Šmíd	6–3, 6–0
Loss	12–13	Mar 1984	Madrid, Spain	Carpet (i)	(United States) Ferdi Taygan	(United States) Peter Fleming (United States) John McEnroe	3–6, 3–6
Loss	12–14	Mar 1984	Rotterdam, Netherlands	Carpet (i)	(United States) Ferdi Taygan	(South Africa) Kevin Curren (Poland) Wojciech Fibak	4–6, 4–6
Loss	12–15	Jul 1984	Stuttgart, West Germany	Clay	(United States) Ferdi Taygan	(United States) Sandy Mayer (West Germany) Andreas Maurer	6–7, 4–6
