= Francisco González (tennis) =

Paraguayan tennis player

- Country (sports): Paraguay
- Residence: Fresno, California, U.S.
- Born: November 19, 1955 (age 70) Wiesbaden, West Germany
- Height: 1.93 m (6 ft 4 in)
- Turned pro: 1977
- Retired: 1990
- Plays: Right-handed
- Prize money: $483,023

Singles
- Career record: 107–171
- Career titles: 0
- Highest ranking: No. 34 (12 July 1978)

Grand Slam singles results
- Australian Open: 3R (1984)
- French Open: 2R (1979, 1982)
- Wimbledon: 4R (1981)
- US Open: 3R (1980)

Doubles
- Career record: 221–200
- Career titles: 10
- Highest ranking: No. 22 (26 November 1984)

Grand Slam doubles results
- Australian Open: QF (1984)
- French Open: QF (1980, 1983, 1985)
- Wimbledon: 3R (1979, 1980)
- US Open: QF (1979)

Grand Slam mixed doubles results
- French Open: F (1985)

Francisco González (born November 19, 1955) played professional tennis in the 1970s and 1980s. He represented Paraguay in Davis Cup and played collegiate tennis at the Ohio State University.

González was ranked as high as world no. 34 in singles, achieved in July 1978, and no. 22 in doubles in November 1984. The biggest singles final of his career was at Cincinnati in 1980, defeating Jimmy Connors in the semifinals before falling to Harold Solomon.

== Career highlights ==
Francisco González has been the head tennis professional at Sierra Sport & Racquet Club since 1998. He had career wins over Ivan Lendl, Jimmy Connors, Stefan Edberg, Andrés Gómez, Vitas Gerulaitis, Yannick Noah, Eliot Teltscher, Johan Kriek, and Henri Leconte. In 1978 he won the men's singles title at the Southern Championships in Greenville, South Carolina.

== Career finals ==
=== Singles: 2 (2 runner-ups) ===
Result	W/L	Date	Tournament	Surface	Opponent	Score
Loss	0–1	Aug 1980	Cincinnati, U.S.	Hard	(United States) Harold Solomon	6–7, 3–6
Loss	0–2	Oct 1984	Brisbane, Australia	Carpet	(United States) Eliot Teltscher	6–3, 3–6, 4–6

=== Doubles: 20 (10 titles, 10 runner-ups) ===
Result	W/L	Date	Tournament	Surface	Partner	Opponents	Score
Win	1–0	Apr 1979	Tulsa, U.S.	Hard (i)	(United States) Eliot Teltscher	(Australia) Colin Dibley (United States) Tom Gullikson	6–7, 7–5, 6–3
Loss	1–1	Aug 1979	Cleveland, Ohio, U.S.	Hard	(United States) Fred McNair	(United States) Robert Lutz (United States) Stan Smith	3–6, 4–6
Loss	1–2	Oct 1979	Maui, U.S.	Hard	(Australia) Rod Frawley	(United Kingdom) John Lloyd (United States) Nick Saviano	5–7, 4–6
Win	2–2	Oct 1979	Sydney, Australia	Hard	(Australia) Rod Frawley	(India) Vijay Amritraj (United States) Pat DuPré	walkover
Loss	2–3	Oct 1979	Tokyo, Japan	Clay	(Australia) Rod Frawley	(Australia) Colin Dibley (Paraguay) Pat DuPré	6–3, 1–6, 1–6
Loss	2–4	Apr 1980	Tulsa, U.S.	Hard (i)	(United States) Van Winitsky	(United States) Robert Lutz (United States) Dick Stockton	6–2, 6–7, 2–6
Loss	2–5	Oct 1982	Maui, U.S.	Hard	(South Africa) Bernard Mitton	(United States) Mike Cahill (United States) Eliot Teltscher	4–6, 4–6
Win	3–5	Oct 1982	Melbourne, Australia	Grass	(United States) Matt Mitchell	(Australia) Syd Ball (Australia) Rod Frawley	7–6, 7–6
Loss	3–6	Nov 1982	Dortmund, West Germany	Carpet	(United States) Mike Cahill	(Czechoslovakia) Pavel Složil (Czechoslovakia) Tomáš Šmíd	2–6, 7–6, 1–6
Win	4–6	May 1983	Florence, Italy	Clay	(Paraguay) Víctor Pecci	(France) Dominique Bedel (France) Bernard Fritz	4–6, 6–4, 7–6
Win	5–6	May 1983	Rome Masters, Italy	Clay	(Paraguay) Víctor Pecci	(Sweden) Jan Gunnarsson (United States) Mike Leach	6–2, 6–7, 6–4
Win	6–6	Jun 1983	Venice, Italy	Clay	(Paraguay) Víctor Pecci	(United States) Steve Krulevitz (Hungary) Zoltán Kuhárszky	6–1, 6–2
Loss	6–7	Aug 1983	Cleveland, U.S.	Hard	(United States) Matt Mitchell	(South Africa) Mike Myburg (South Africa) Christo van Rensburg	6–7, 5–7
Win	7–7	Aug 1984	Cleveland, U.S.	Hard	(United States) Matt Mitchell	(United States) Martin Davis (United States) Chris Dunk	7–6, 7–5
Win	8–7	Aug 1984	Cincinnati, U.S.	Hard	(United States) Matt Mitchell	(United States) Sandy Mayer (Hungary) Balázs Taróczy	4–6, 6–3, 7–6
Win	9–7	Oct 1984	Brisbane, Australia	Carpet	(United States) Matt Mitchell	(Australia) Broderick Dyke (Australia) Wally Masur	6–7, 6–2, 7–5
Win	10–7	Nov 1984	Johannesburg, South Africa	Hard	(United States) Tracy Delatte	(United States) Steve Meister (United States) Eliot Teltscher	7–6, 6–1
Loss	10–8	Mar 1986	Metz, France	Carpet (i)	(Netherlands) Michiel Schapers	(Poland) Wojciech Fibak (France) Guy Forget	6–2, 2–6, 4–6
Loss	10–9	Mar 1986	Chicago, U.S.	Carpet (i)	(South Africa) Eddie Edwards	(United States) Ken Flach (United States) Robert Seguso	0–6, 5–7
Loss	10–10	Jul 1986	Newport, U.S.	Grass	(South Africa) Eddie Edwards	(India) Vijay Amritraj (United States) Tim Wilkison	6–4, 5–7, 6–7
