= Eliot Teltscher =

American tennis player (born 1959)

- Country (sports): United States
- Residence: Irvine, California
- Born: March 15, 1959 (age 67) Rancho Palos Verdes, California, US
- Height: 1.78 m (5 ft 10 in)
- Turned pro: 1977
- Retired: 1988
- Plays: Right-handed (one-handed backhand)
- Prize money: $1,653,997

Singles
- Career record: 399–217
- Career titles: 10
- Highest ranking: No. 6 (June 7, 1982)

Grand Slam singles results
- Australian Open: QF (1983)
- French Open: 4R (1979, 1982, 1983)
- Wimbledon: 3R (1977)
- US Open: QF (1980, 1981, 1983)

Other tournaments
- Tour Finals: QF (1984)
- WCT Finals: QF (1984)

Doubles
- Career record: 161–164
- Career titles: 4
- Highest ranking: No. 38 (August 26, 1985)

Grand Slam doubles results
- Australian Open: 3R (1983)
- French Open: F (1981)
- Wimbledon: 3R (1985)

Grand Slam mixed doubles results
- French Open: W (1983)
- Wimbledon: QF (1985)

Eliot Teltscher (born March 15, 1959) is a retired professional American tennis player. He won the 1983 French Open Mixed Doubles. His highest ranking in singles was No. 6 in the world and in doubles was No. 38 in the world.

== Tennis career ==
=== Early years ===
Teltscher was born in Palos Verdes, California, and lives in Irvine, California. His mother was born in Mandatory Palestine, and his father, Eric, of Austrian descent, was a Holocaust survivor who immigrated to Mandatory Palestine and joined the British military, ultimately becoming an industrial engineer. Eliot began playing tennis when he was nine, and by the time he was 17, he was ranked along the top ten in the United States junior rankings.

He attended UCLA in 1978 on a tennis scholarship, but dropped out to begin his professional tennis career.

=== Pro career ===
In 1979, Teltscher turned pro. A worldwide top 10 player from 1980 to 1982. He reached his highest singles ATP-ranking on May 7, 1982, when he became ranked No. 6 in the world.

He and his partner Terry Moor made it to the finals of the French Open in 1981, and he and Barbara Jordan won the mixed doubles title in 1983. He made it to the quarterfinals at the US Open in 1980, 1981, and 1983, where each time he was defeated by Jimmy Connors. He won 10 singles titles during his professional career, which ended in 1988.

=== Davis Cup ===
Teltscher was on the U.S. Davis Cup team in 1982, 1983, and 1985. His team defeated France in the 1982 tournament.

== Coaching ==
He served as a coach for Justin Gimelstob, Richey Reneberg (1997), Jeff Tarango (1995), Pete Sampras, Jim Grabb (1992), Phillip King and others.

Teltscher served as a head men's tennis coach at Pepperdine University for the 1991–92 school season, and as a tennis coach at the Manhattan Beach Country Club from 1992 to 1997.

He was a coach of the US national team from 1998 to 2001, then he became the coach to Taylor Dent.

He was named USTA Director of Tennis Operations in December 2002.

Teltscher was named the 2003 Pan American Games Men's Coach.

== Jewish Sports Hall of Fame ==
Teltscher, who is Jewish, was inducted into the National Jewish Sports Hall of Fame in 1991, into the Southern California Jewish Sports Hall of Fame in 1998, and into the International Jewish Sports Hall of Fame in 2009.

== Grand Slam finals ==
=== Doubles ===
Result	Year	Championship	Surface	Partner	Opponents	Score
Loss	1981	French Open	Clay	(United States) Terry Moor	(Switzerland) Heinz Günthardt (Hungary) Balázs Taróczy	2–6, 6–7, 3–6

=== Mixed doubles ===
Result	Year	Championship	Surface	Partner	Opponents	Score
Win	1983	French Open	Clay	(United States) Barbara Jordan	(United States) Leslie Allen (United States) Charles Strode	6–2, 6–3

== ATP Tour finals ==
=== Singles 24 (10–14) ===
Result	W/L	Date	Tournament	Surface	Opponent	Score
Loss	0–1	Aug 1978	Atlanta, U.S.	Hard	(United States) Stan Smith	6–4, 1–6, 1–2, ret.
Win	1–1	Nov 1978	Hong Kong	Hard	(United States) Pat Du Pré	6–4, 6–3, 6–2
Win	2–1	Sep 1979	Atlanta, U.S.	Hard	(Australia) John Alexander	6–3, 4–6, 6–2
Loss	2–2	Jan 1980	Birmingham, U.S.	Carpet	(United States) Jimmy Connors	3–6, 2–6
Loss	2–3	Apr 1980	New Orleans, U.S.	Carpet	(Poland) Wojciech Fibak	4–6, 5–7
Win	3–3	Aug 1980	Atlanta, U.S.	Hard	(United States) Terry Moor	6–2, 6–2
Loss	3–4	Sep 1980	San Francisco, U.S.	Carpet	(United States) Gene Mayer	2–6, 6–2, 1–6
Win	4–4	Oct 1980	Maui, U.S.	Hard	(United States) Tim Wilkison	7–6, 6–3
Loss	4–5	Oct 1980	Guangzhou, China	Carpet	(United States) Jimmy Connors	2–6, 4–6
Loss	4–6	Oct 1980	Tokyo, Japan	Clay	(Czechoslovakia) Ivan Lendl	6–3, 4–6, 0–6
Win	5–6	Jan 1981	San Juan, U.S.	Hard	(United States) Tim Gullikson	6–4, 6–2
Loss	5–7	Aug 1981	Montreal, Canada	Hard	(Czechoslovakia) Ivan Lendl	3–6, 2–6
Win	6–7	Sep 1981	San Francisco, U.S.	Carpet	(United States) Brian Teacher	6–3, 7–6^{(7–4)}
Loss	6–8	Oct 1981	Tokyo Outdoor, Japan	Clay	(Hungary) Balázs Taróczy	3–6, 6–1, 6–7^{(3–7)}
Loss	6–9	May 1982	Rome, Italy	Clay	(Ecuador) Andrés Gómez	2–6, 3–6, 2–6
Loss	6–10	Oct 1982	Melbourne Indoor, Australia	Carpet	(United States) Vitas Gerulaitis	6–2, 2–6, 2–6
Loss	6–11	Feb 1983	La Quinta, U.S.	Hard	(Spain) José Higueras	4–6, 2–6
Win	7–11	Oct 1983	Tokyo, Japan	Hard	(Ecuador) Andrés Gómez	7–5, 3–6, 6–1
Loss	7–12	Sep 1984	Los Angeles, U.S.	Hard	(United States) Jimmy Connors	4–6, 6–4, 4–6
Win	8–12	Oct 1984	Brisbane, Australia	Hard	(Paraguay) Francisco González	3–6, 6–3, 6–4
Win	9–12	Nov 1984	Johannesburg, South Africa	Hard	(United States) Vitas Gerulaitis	6–3, 6–1, 7–6
Loss	9–13	Oct 1987	Scottsdale, U.S.	Hard	(United States) Brad Gilbert	2–6, 2–6
Win	10–13	Nov 1987	Hong Kong	Hard	(Australia) John Fitzgerald	6–7^{(6–8)}, 3–6, 6–1, 6–2, 7–5
Loss	10–14	Feb 1988	Guarujá, Brazil	Hard	(Brazil) Luiz Mattar	3–6, 3–6

=== Doubles 14 (4–10) ===
Result	W/L	Date	Tournament	Surface	Partner	Opponents	Score
Loss	0–1	Aug 1978	Columbus, U.S.	Clay	(Mexico) Marcello Lara	(Australia) Colin Dibley (Australia) Bob Giltinan	2–6, 3–6
Win	1–1	Apr 1979	Tulsa, U.S.	Hard (i)	(Paraguay) Francisco González	(Australia) Colin Dibley (United States) Tom Gullikson	6–7, 7–5, 6–3
Loss	1–2	Sep 1979	Atlanta, U.S.	Hard	(Australia) Steve Docherty	(South Africa) Raymond Moore (Romania) Ilie Năstase	4–6, 2–6
Win	2–2	Apr 1980	New Orleans, U.S.	Carpet	(United States) Terry Moor	(South Africa) Raymond Moore (South Africa) Robert Trogolo	7–6, 6–1
Loss	2–3	May 1980	Rome, Italy	Clay	(Hungary) Balázs Taróczy	(Australia) Mark Edmondson (Australia) Kim Warwick	6–7, 6–7
Loss	2–4	Aug 1980	Columbus, United States	Hard	(United States) Peter Fleming	(United States) Brian Gottfried (United States) Sandy Mayer	4–6, 2–6
Loss	2–5	Oct 1980	Tokyo Outdoor, Japan	Clay	(United States) Terry Moor	(Australia) Ross Case (Chile) Jaime Fillol	3–6, 6–3, 4–6
Loss	2–6	Nov 1980	Wembley, England	Carpet	(United States) Bill Scanlon	(United States) Peter Fleming (United States) John McEnroe	5–7, 3–6
Loss	2–7	Jan 1981	San Juan, Puerto Rico	Hard	(United States) Tim Gullikson	(United States) Tim Mayotte (United States) Chris Mayotte	4–6, 6–7
Loss	2–8	Feb 1981	La Quinta, U.S.	Hard	(United States) Terry Moor	(United States) Bruce Manson (United States) Brian Teacher	6–7, 2–6
Loss	2–9	Jun 1981	French Open, Paris	Clay	(United States) Terry Moor	(Switzerland) Heinz Günthardt (Hungary) Balázs Taróczy	2–6, 6–7, 3–6
Win	3–9	Jan 1982	Delray Beach WCT, U.S.	Clay	(United States) Mel Purcell	(Czechoslovakia) Tomáš Šmíd (Hungary) Balázs Taróczy	6–4, 7–6
Win	4–9	Oct 1982	Maui, U.S.	Hard	(United States) Mike Cahill	(Paraguay) Francisco González (South Africa) Bernard Mitton	6–4, 6–4
Loss	4–10	Nov 1984	Johannesburg, South Africa	Hard	(United States) Steve Meister	(United States) Tracy Delatte (Paraguay) Francisco González	6–7, 1–6

== See also ==
- List of select Jewish tennis players
