= Matt Mitchell (tennis) =

American tennis player (born 1957)

- Country (sports): United States
- Born: March 16, 1957 (age 69) Berkeley, California, United States
- Height: 5 ft 11 in (1.80 m)
- Turned pro: 1977
- Retired: 1990
- Plays: Right-handed
- Prize money: $303,978

Singles
- Career record: 64–103
- Career titles: 1
- Highest ranking: No. 53 (2 January 1985)

Grand Slam singles results
- Australian Open: 3R (1979, 1984)
- French Open: 1R (1983, 1984, 1985)
- Wimbledon: 2R (1985)
- US Open: 2R (1982)

Doubles
- Career record: 123–133
- Career titles: 7
- Highest ranking: No. 30 (8 October 1984)

Grand Slam doubles results
- Australian Open: QF (1984)
- French Open: QF (1985)
- Wimbledon: 2R (1982, 1983, 1984)
- US Open: SF (1986)

Matt Mitchell (born 16 March 1957) is a retired American tennis player who played from 1974 to 1987. As a doubles pro, he was once the world's 30th-best. As an amateur, he won two NCAA championships and earned a place in two halls of fame.

== Early life ==
Mitchell, who was born in Berkeley, California, was the number one player in the last year of his age group from the 10s through the 16s. Mitchell holds four National Junior Titles: National Hardcourt Championships in Burlingame, California, in the 12-and-under Doubles with Jeff Robinson at the Peninsula Tennis Club; National Hardcourt Championships in Burlingame, California, in the 14-and-under Singles where he defeated Southern California's Perry Wright in the finals after upsetting Howard Schoenfield in the semifinals; National Hardcourt Championships in Burlingame, California at the Peninsula Tennis Club in the 16-and-under Singles, where he defeated Southern California's Walter Redondo; and, the National Hardcourt Championships in Kalamazoo, Michigan, in the 16-and-under Doubles with Nial Brash.

== Career ==
=== Amateur ===
In 1974, Mitchell was recruited by Coach Dick Gould of Stanford University, where he signed his letter of intent in 1975. At Stanford University, he became a three-time All-American, where he achieved his first All-American honors when he beat the two-sport All-American John Lucas from the University of Maryland in the round of 32 at the NCAA Championships in Corpus Christi, Texas.

In 1977, Mitchell helped win the NCAA National Team Championships, where each team sent their best six singles players and best three doubles teams to compete in a single-elimination tournament. After Stanford University won the National Team Championships, Mitchell, seeded first in the singles event, beat John Bennett of Brigham Young University, John Austin of UCLA, Ben McKown of Trinity College, Bruce Nichols of UCLA, Chris Lewis of USC, and finally, Tony Graham of UCLA in a best-of-five set to win the NCAA Singles Championship.

=== Professional ===
In 1979 Mitchell, in his first year as a professional player, was nominated as Rookie of the Year after he was ranked the second highest rookie, behind Vince Van Patten. Mitchell's greatest success in singles came at the Black and Decker Championships, in Melbourne, Australia in 1984, where he beat Eliot Teltscher who was eighth in the world, and Pat Cash who was tenth in the world to win the tournament. That single event catapulted Mitchell's ranking from 164 in the world to 63.

Mitchell's greatest success as a professional came as a doubles player, winning seven tournaments in doubles between 1980 and 1985. These included the 1984 ATP Player's Championships in Cincinnati, Ohio with Francisco Gonzalez, and, while partnering with Kevin Curren former All-American from University of Texas at Austin in 1986, they lost in the semifinals of the US Open Championships to Mats Wilander and Joakim Nyström of Sweden in a five-set match, 7–6 in the fifth. Mitchell's highest doubles ranking as a professional was 30 in the world.

== Honors ==
In 1981, Mitchell was inducted into Stanford University Athletic Hall of Fame.

In 2006, Mitchell was inducted into the Intercollegiate Tennis Association's Men's Collegiate Tennis Hall of Fame.

== Career finals ==
=== Singles: 1 title, 1 runner-up ===
Result	W/L	Date	Tournament	Surface	Opponent	Score
Loss	0–1	Aug 1983	Cleveland, U.S.	Hard	(United States) Martin Davis	3–6, 2–6
Win	1–1	Oct 1984	Melbourne, Australia	Carpet (i)	(Australia) Pat Cash	6–4, 3–6, 6–2

=== Doubles: 7 titles, 3 runner-ups ===
Result	W/L	Date	Tournament	Surface	Partner	Opponents	Score
Win	1–0	Oct 1980	Brisbane, Australia	Grass	(United States) John McEnroe	(Australia) Phil Dent (Australia) Rod Frawley	8–6
Win	2–0	Oct 1981	Maui, U.S.	Hard	(United States) Tony Graham	(Australia) John Alexander (United States) James Delaney	6–3, 3–6, 7–6
Loss	2–1	Aug 1982	Cleveland, U.S.	Hard	(United States) Craig Wittus	(United States) Victor Amaya (United States) Hank Pfister	4–6, 6–7
Win	3–1	Oct 1982	Melbourne, Australia	Grass	(Paraguay) Francisco González	(Australia) Syd Ball (Australia) Rod Frawley	7–6, 7–6
Loss	3–2	Aug 1983	Cleveland, U.S.	Hard	(Paraguay) Francisco González	(South Africa) Mike Myburg (South Africa) Christo van Rensburg	6–7, 5–7
Win	4–2	Aug 1984	Cleveland, U.S.	Hard	(Paraguay) Francisco González	(United States) Martin Davis (United States) Chris Dunk	7–6, 7–5
Win	5–2	Aug 1984	Cincinnati, U.S.	Hard	(Paraguay) Francisco González	(United States) Sandy Mayer (Hungary) Balázs Taróczy	4–6, 6–3, 7–6
Win	6–2	Oct 1984	Brisbane, Australia	Carpet (i)	(Paraguay) Francisco González	(Australia) Broderick Dyke (Australia) Wally Masur	6–7, 6–2, 7–5
Win	7–2	Oct 1985	Melbourne, Australia	Carpet (i)	(Australia) Brad Drewett	(United States) David Dowlen (Niger) Nduka Odizor	4–6, 7–6, 6–4
Loss	7–3	Mar 1986	Rotterdam, Netherlands	Carpet (i)	(Poland) Wojciech Fibak	(Sweden) Stefan Edberg (Socialist Federal Republic of Yugoslavia) Slobodan Živojinović	6–2, 3–6, 2–6
