= Martin Davis (tennis) =

American tennis player

- Country (sports): United States
- Residence: Santa Barbara, California
- Born: November 15, 1958 (age 67) San Jose, California, United States
- Height: 6 ft 0 in (183 cm)
- Turned pro: 1981
- Retired: 1990
- Plays: Right-handed
- Prize money: US$ 821,513

Singles
- Career record: 152–173
- Career titles: 4
- Highest ranking: No. 47 (24 June 1985)

Grand Slam singles results
- Australian Open: 2R (1981, 1983, 1984, 1987, 1989)
- French Open: 2R (1988)
- Wimbledon: 3R (1984)
- US Open: 3R (1981)

Doubles
- Career record: 183–189
- Career titles: 4
- Highest ranking: No. 29 (14 November 1988)

Grand Slam doubles results
- Australian Open: SF (1988, 1989)
- French Open: QF (1984)
- Wimbledon: QF (1982, 1986)
- US Open: 2R (1989)

Grand Slam mixed doubles results
- Australian Open: SF (1988)

Martin "Marty" Davis (born November 15, 1958) is a former professional tennis player from the United States.

During his career, Davis won four singles titles and four doubles titles. He achieved a career-high singles ranking of world No. 47 in June 1985 and a career-high doubles ranking of world No. 29 in November 1988.

== Career finals ==
=== Singles: 6 (4 titles, 2 runner-ups) ===
Result	W-L	Date	Tournament	Surface	Opponent	Score
Win	1–0	Aug 1983	Cleveland, US	Hard	(United States) Matt Mitchell	6–3, 6–2
Loss	1–1	Aug 1984	Cleveland, US	Hard	(United States) Terry Moor	6–3, 6–7, 2–6
Win	2–1	Sep 1984	Honolulu, US	Hard	(United States) David Pate	6–1, 6–2
Win	3–1	Jun 1985	Bristol, UK	Grass	(United States) Glenn Layendecker	4–6, 6–3, 7–5
Win	4–1	Oct 1985	Melbourne Indoor, Australia	Carpet	(United States) Paul Annacone	6–4, 6–4
Loss	4–2	Oct 1988	Brisbane, Australia	Hard (i)	(United States) Tim Mayotte	4–6, 4–6

=== Doubles: 12 (4 titles, 8 runner-ups) ===
Result	W-L	Date	Tournament	Surface	Partner	Opponents	Score
Win	1–0	Mar 1981	Mexico City, Mexico	Clay	(United States) Chris Dunk	(Australia) John Fitzgerald (Australia) Ross Case	6–3, 6–4
Loss	1–1	Nov 1981	Hong Kong	Hard	(Australia) Brad Drewett	(United States) Chris Dunk (United States) Chris Mayotte	4–6, 6–7
Loss	1–2	Sep 1982	San Francisco, US	Carpet	(United States) Chris Dunk	(United States) Fritz Buehning (United States) Brian Teacher	7–6^{(7–5)}, 2–6, 5–7
Loss	1–3	Aug 1984	Cleveland, US	Hard	(United States) Chris Dunk	(Paraguay) Francisco González (United States) Matt Mitchell	6–7, 5–7
Win	2–3	Oct 1985	Brisbane, Australia	Carpet	(Australia) Brad Drewett	(United States) Bud Schultz (United States) Ben Testerman	6–2, 6–2
Loss	2–4	Nov 1987	Hong Kong	Hard	(Australia) Brad Drewett	(Australia) Mark Kratzmann (United States) Jim Pugh	7–6, 4–6, 2–6
Win	3–4	Jan 1988	Auckland, New Zealand	Hard	(United States) Tim Pawsat	(United States) Sammy Giammalva Jr. (United States) Jim Grabb	6–3, 3–6, 6–4
Loss	3–5	Jun 1988	Bristol, UK	Grass	(United States) Tim Pawsat	(Australia) Peter Doohan (Australia) Laurie Warder	6–2, 4–6, 5–7
Loss	3–6	Oct 1988	Sydney Indoor, Australia	Hard (i)	(Australia) Brad Drewett	(Australia) Darren Cahill (Australia) John Fitzgerald	3–6, 2–6
Loss	3–7	Nov 1988	London Wembley, UK	Carpet (i)	(Australia) Brad Drewett	(United States) Ken Flach (United States) Robert Seguso	5–7, 2–6
Win	4–7	Sep 1989	Los Angeles, US	Hard	(United States) Tim Pawsat	(Australia) John Fitzgerald (Sweden) Anders Järryd	7–5, 7–6
Loss	4–8	May 1990	Rome, Italy	Clay	(United States) Jim Courier	(Spain) Sergio Casal (Spain) Emilio Sánchez	6–7, 5–7
