= 1983 Stella Artois Championships =

- Date: 6–13 June
- Edition: 81st
- Category: Grand Prix
- Draw: 64S / 32D
- Prize money: $200,000
- Surface: Grass / outdoor
- Location: London, United Kingdom
- Venue: Queen's Club

Champions

Singles
- (United States) Jimmy Connors

Doubles
- (United States) Brian Gottfried / (Australia) Paul McNamee
← 1982 ·	Queen's Club Championships	· 1984 →

The 1983 Stella Artois Championships was a men's tennis tournament played on grass courts at the Queen's Club in London, United Kingdom that was part of the 1983 Volvo Grand Prix. It was the 81st edition of the tournament and took place from 6 June until 13 June 1983. First-seeded Jimmy Connors won his second consecutive singles title at the event.

== Finals ==
=== Singles ===
(United States) Jimmy Connors defeated (United States) John McEnroe 6–3, 6–3

- It was Connors' 3rd title of the year and the 112th of his career.

=== Doubles ===
(United States) Brian Gottfried / (Australia) Paul McNamee defeated (South Africa) Kevin Curren / (United States) Steve Denton 6–4, 6–3

- It was Gottfried's 2nd title of the year and the 77th of his career. It was McNamee's 2nd title of the year and the 20th of his career.

== See also ==
- Connors–McEnroe rivalry
