= Connors–McEnroe rivalry =

Men's professional tennis match up

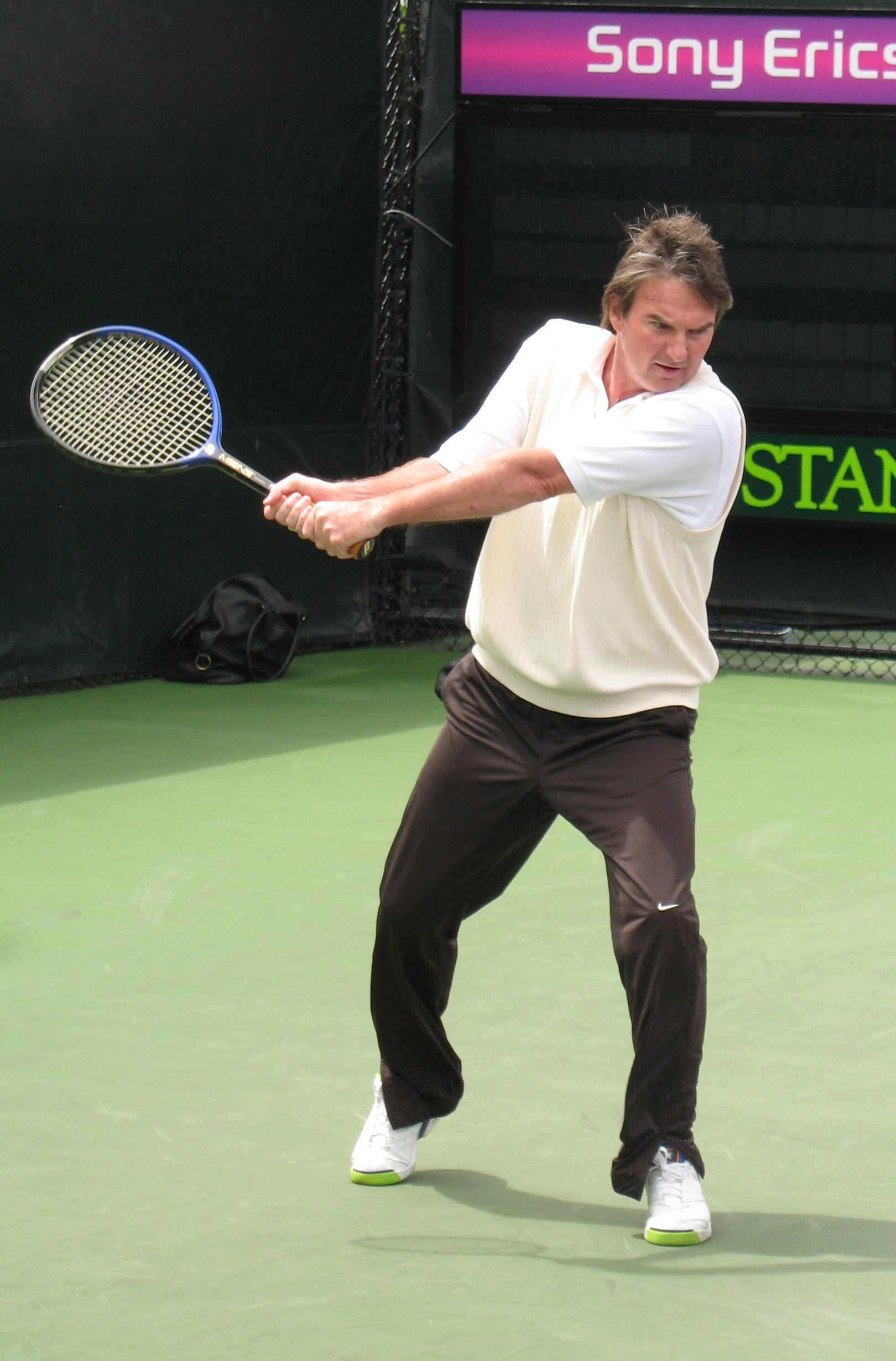
Jimmy Connors
World No. 1
8 Major singles
109 singles titles

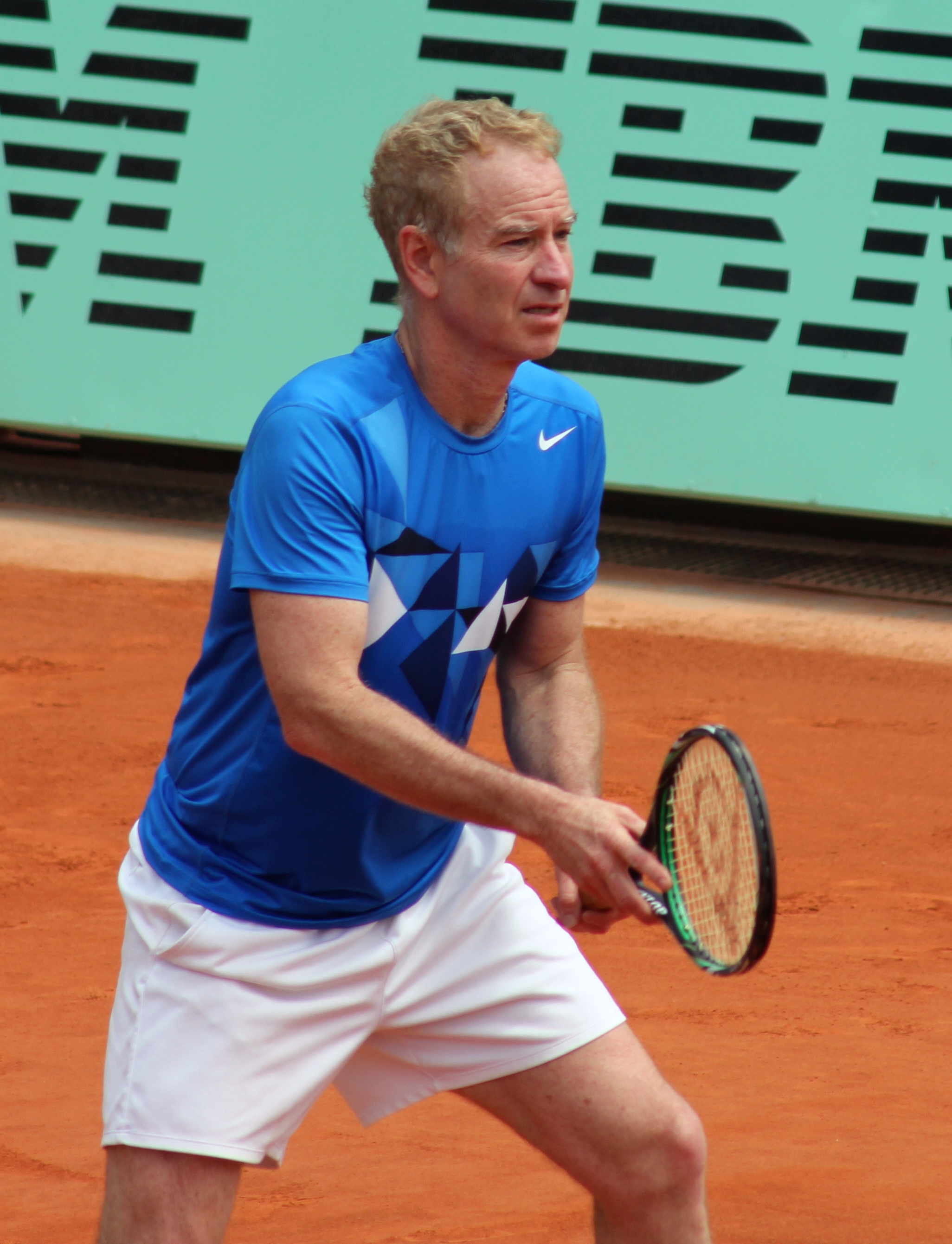
John McEnroe
World No. 1
7 Major singles
77 singles titles

Jimmy Connors and John McEnroe had a tennis rivalry, playing 34 times between 1977 and 1991. Their head-to-head was 20–14, favoring McEnroe.

Connors and McEnroe played again in the late 1990s and the early 2000s on the senior tour. With regard to their matches, Connors has stated, "Something like that never goes away, especially between Mac and myself...To have carried on this rivalry for so many years, and for you still to be talking about it, must mean that we made our mark somewhere." This rivalry is said to have been one of the most contentious and embittered in all of tennis history.

== Head-to-head ==
Legend	Connors	McEnroe
Grand Slam	3	6
Masters Grand Prix	0	2
WCT Finals	1	2
ATP International Series	10	10
Total	14	20

=== Official matches (34) ===
Connors 14 – McEnroe 20

No.	Date	Tournament	Surface	Round	Winner	Score	Connors	McEnroe
1.	Jul 1977	Wimbledon	Grass	Semifinals	Connors	6–3, 6–3, 4–6, 6–4	1	0
2.	Aug 1977	US Pro Tennis Championships	Clay	Last 32	Connors	5–7, 6–2, 7–5	2	0
3.	Aug 1978	US Clay Court Championships	Clay	Quarterfinals	Connors	3–6, 6–1, 6–1	3	0
4.	Sep 1978	US Open	Hard	Semifinals	Connors	6–2, 6–2, 7–5	4	0
5.	Jan 1979	Masters Grand Prix	Carpet	Round Robin	McEnroe	7–5, 3–0 RET	4	1
6.	Feb 1979	Pepsi Grand Slam	Clay	Semifinals	Connors	6–3, 6–4	5	1
7.	Apr 1979	Alan King Tennis Classic	Hard	Semifinals	Connors	7–5, 6–4	6	1
8.	May 1979	WCT Finals	Carpet	Semifinals	McEnroe	6–1, 6–4, 6–4	6	2
9.	Sep 1979	US Open	Hard	Semifinals	McEnroe	6–3, 6–3, 7–5	6	3
10.	Jan 1980	US Pro Indoor	Carpet	Final	Connors	6–3, 2–6, 6–3, 3–6, 6–4	7	3
11.	Mar 1980	US Indoor Championships	Carpet	Final	McEnroe	7–6^{(8–6)}, 7–6^{(7–4)}	7	4
12.	May 1980	WCT Finals	Carpet	Final	Connors	2–6, 7–6^{(7–4)}, 6–1, 6–2	8	4
13.	Jul 1980	Wimbledon	Grass	Semifinals	McEnroe	6–3, 3–6, 6–3, 6–4	8	5
14.	Sep 1980	US Open	Hard	Semifinals	McEnroe	6–4, 5–7, 0–6, 6–3, 7–6^{(7–3)}	8	6
15.	Nov 1981	Wembley Championships	Carpet	Final	Connors	3–6, 2–6, 6–3, 6–4, 6–2	9	6
16.	Jan 1981	Masters Grand Prix	Carpet	Round Robin	McEnroe	6–2, 7–5	9	7
17.	Jan 1982	US Pro Indoor	Carpet	Final	McEnroe	6–3, 6–3, 6–1	9	8
18.	Jun 1982	Queen's Club Championships	Grass	Final	Connors	7–5, 6–3	10	8
19.	Jul 1982	Wimbledon	Grass	Final	Connors	3–6, 6–3, 6–7^{(2–7)}, 7–6^{(7–5)}, 6–4	11	8
20.	Sep 1982	Pacific Coast Championships	Carpet	Final	McEnroe	6–1, 6–3	11	9
21.	Jun 1983	Queen's Club Championships	Grass	Final	Connors	6–3, 6–3	12	9
22.	Sep 1983	ATP Championships	Hard	Semifinals	McEnroe	6–7, 6–1, 6–4	12	10
23.	Nov 1983	Wembley Championships	Carpet	Final	McEnroe	7–5, 6–1, 6–4	12	11
24.	Apr 1984	WCT Finals	Carpet	Final	McEnroe	6–1, 6–2, 6–3	12	12
25.	Jun 1984	French Open	Clay	Semifinals	McEnroe	7–5, 6–1, 6–2	12	13
26.	Jun 1984	Queen's Club Championships	Grass	Semifinals	McEnroe	6–2, 6–2	12	14
27.	Jul 1984	Wimbledon	Grass	Final	McEnroe	6–1, 6–1, 6–2	12	15
28.	Aug 1984	Canadian Open	Hard	Semifinals	McEnroe	2–6, 6–2, 6–3	12	16
29.	Sep 1984	US Open	Hard	Semifinals	McEnroe	6–4, 4–6, 7–5, 4–6, 6–3	12	17
—	Apr 1985	Chicago Grand Prix	Carpet	Final	(McEnroe)	Walkover	12	17
30.	Aug 1985	Canadian Open	Hard	Semifinals	McEnroe	6–2, 6–3	12	18
31.	Sep 1986	Pacific Coast Championships	Carpet	Final	McEnroe	7–6^{(8–6)}, 6–3	12	19
32.	Aug 1987	Canadian Open	Hard	Quarterfinals	Connors	6–3, 3–6, 6–3	13	19
33.	Oct 1989	Grand Prix de Tennis de Toulouse	Carpet	Final	Connors	6–3, 6–3	14	19
34.	Sep 1991	Swiss Indoors	Hard (i)	Semifinals	McEnroe	6–1, 6–3	14	20

=== Head-to-head tallies ===
The following is a breakdown of their head-to-head results:

- All matches: (34) McEnroe 20–14
- All finals: (15)* Tied 7–7, (1 Walkover not included in the head to head results)
  - Grand Slam finals: Tied 1–1
  - Grand Slam matches: McEnroe 6–3
  - Masters matches: McEnroe 2–0
  - WCT Finals matches: McEnroe 2–1
  - Clay court matches: Connors 3–1
  - Grass court matches: Connors 4–3
  - Hard court matches: McEnroe 6–3
  - Indoor matches: McEnroe 10–4

== Other matches ==
=== Invitational matches ===
Connors–McEnroe (6–9)

No.	Year	Tournament	Surface	Round	Winner	Score
1.	1979	Frejus	Carpet	Final	McEnroe	6–4, 6–3
2.	1979	Aix-en-Provence	Carpet	Third Place	McEnroe	6–4, 6–3
3.	1979	Montpellier	Carpet	Final	Connors	7–6, 2–6, 7–5
4.	1979	Frankfurt	Carpet	Semifinals	Connors	7–5, 6–4
5.	1980	Brussels	Carpet	Semifinals	McEnroe	6–1, 7–5
6.	1980	Suntory Cup	Carpet	Final	Connors	7–5, 6–3
7.	1980	Challenge of Champions	Carpet	Final	McEnroe	6–2, 6–4, 6–1
8.	1981	Suntory Cup	Carpet	Final	Connors	6–4, 7–6
9.	1981	Challenge of Champions	Carpet	Final	Connors	6–7, 7–5, 6–7, 7–5, 6–4
10.	1982	Challenge of Champions	Carpet	Semifinals	Connors	6–1, 5–7, 6–2
11.	1984	Suntory Cup	Carpet	Semifinals	McEnroe	4–6, 6–3, 6–4
12.	1984	Challenge of Champions	Carpet	Round Robin	McEnroe	6–3, 4–6, 6–2
13.	1987	Challenge of Champions	Carpet	Semifinals	McEnroe	6–4, 6–4
14.	1988	Challenge of Champions	Clay	Round Robin	McEnroe	7–5, 6–1
15.	1989	Scottish Grass Court Championships	Grass	Final	McEnroe	7–6, 7–6

== ATP rankings ==
=== Year-end ranking timeline ===
Player	1973	1974	1975	1976	1977	1978	1979	1980	1981	1982	1983	1984	1985	1986	1987	1988	1989	1990	1991	1992	1993	1994	1995	1996
Jimmy Connors	3	1	1	1	1	1	2	3	3	2	3	2	4	8	4	7	14	936	49	84	370	672	419	1300
John McEnroe					21	4	3	2	1	1	1	1	2	14	10	11	4	13	28	20		1219		

=== ATP Year-end ranking timeline by age ===
Age at end of season

Year-end ranking	18	19	20	21	22	23	24	25	26	27	28	29	30	31	32	33	34	35	36	37	38	39	40	41	42	43	44
Jimmy Connors	No ATP rankings			3	1	1	1	1	1	2	3	3	2	3	2	4	8	4	7	14	936	49	84	370	672	419	1300
John McEnroe	21	4	3	2	1	1	1	1	2	14	10	11	4	13	28	20		1219									

== See also ==
- Borg–Connors rivalry
- Borg–McEnroe rivalry
- Lendl–McEnroe rivalry
- Connors–Lendl rivalry
- List of tennis rivalries
