= Connors–Lendl rivalry =

Tennis rivalry

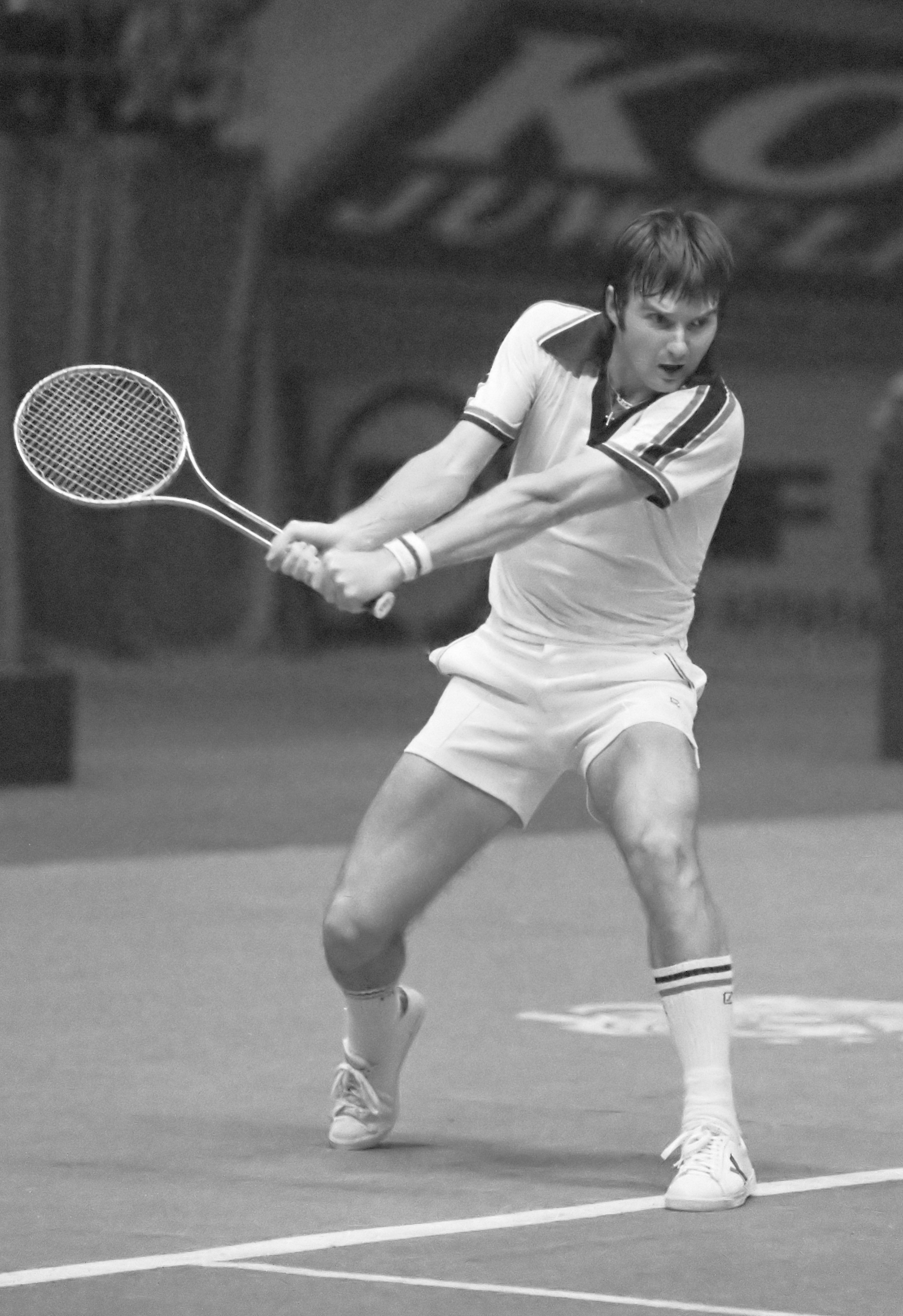
Jimmy Connors
– World No. 1
– 8 Major singles
– 3 year-end championships

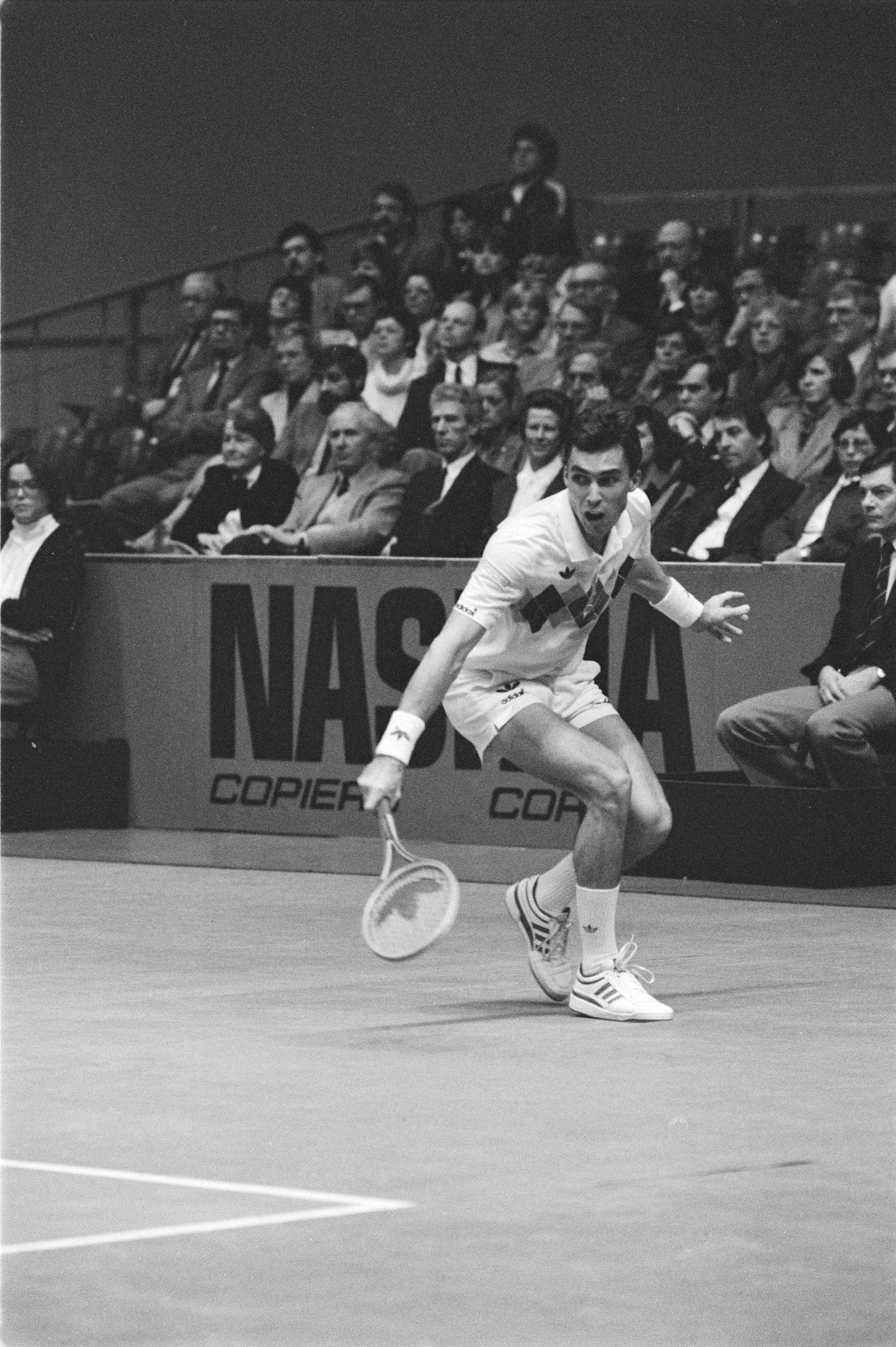
Ivan Lendl
– World No. 1
– 8 Major singles
– 7 year-end championships

The Connors–Lendl rivalry was a tennis rivalry between Jimmy Connors and Ivan Lendl. They met 35 times, with the head-to-head finishing at 22–13, favoring Lendl. Their rivalry transitioned significantly over time: Connors (who is 7 and a half years older than Lendl) won their first 8 matches, while Lendl won the last 17.

Lendl and Connors were both world No. 1s and major champions, with each winning eight major titles. At the majors they met seven times, with Lendl winning the final four meetings and Connors winning the first three. The rivalry between the two, as well as their rivalries with fellow player John McEnroe, have been described as "spikey."

The rivalry was first noted in the 1982 US Open final when Connors dared Lendl to drive the ball past him. Connors subsequently won the final in four sets. In a rematch in 1983, Connors was rushed to the locker room late in the second set before coming back out to defeat Lendl once again in four sets. The final match between the two was also at the US Open, in 1992, where Connors led for a set and a half before falling to his 17th defeat in 8 years to Lendl.

== Head-to-head ==
Legend	Connors	Lendl
Grand Slam	3	4
Masters Grand Prix	1	4
WCT Finals	1	1
ATP International Series	7	13
Davis Cup	1	0
Total	13	22

=== Official matches (35) ===
Connors 13 – Lendl 22

No.	Year	Tournament	Surface	Round	Winner	Score	Connors	Lendl
1.	1979	US Clay Court Championships	Clay	Quarterfinals	Connors	6–2, 7–6^{(7–0)}	1	0
2.	1980	US Indoor Championships	Carpet	Last 16	Connors	6–2, 6–3	2	0
3.	1980	WCT Finals	Carpet	Semifinals	Connors	6–4, 7–5, 6–3	3	0
4.	1980	Volvo International	Clay	Semifinals	Connors	6–4, 6–2	4	0
5.	1980	Cincinnati Open	Hard	Quarterfinals	Connors	6–2, 6–0	5	0
6.	1980	Masters Grand Prix	Carpet	Round Robin	Connors	7–6^{(7–1)}, 6–1	6	0
7.	1981	Indian Wells Masters	Hard	Final	Connors	6–3, 7–6^{(7–5)}	7	0
8.	1981	Davis Cup	Hard	Quarterfinals	Connors	7–5, 6–4	8	0
9.	1982	Cincinnati Open	Hard	Semifinals	Lendl	6–1, 6–1	8	1
10.	1982	US Open	Hard	Final	Connors	6–3, 6–2, 4–6, 6–4	9	1
11.	1982	Masters Grand Prix	Carpet	Semifinals	Lendl	6–3, 6–1	9	2
12.	1983	Queen's Club Championships	Grass	Semifinals	Connors	6–0, 6–3	10	2
13.	1983	Canadian Open	Hard	Semifinals	Lendl	6–1, 6–3	10	3
14.	1983	US Open	Hard	Final	Connors	6–3, 6–7^{(2–7)}, 7–5, 6–0	11	3
15.	1983	Masters Grand Prix	Carpet	Semifinals	Lendl	6–3, 6–4	11	4
—	1984	Rotterdam Open	Carpet	Final	(No Result)	0–6, 0–1 Abandoned due to a bomb scare	11	4
16.	1984	WCT Tournament of Champions	Clay	Semifinals	Lendl	6–0, 6–0	11	5
17.	1984	Wimbledon	Grass	Semifinals	Connors	6–7^{(4–7)}, 6–3, 7–5, 6–1	12	5
18.	1984	Tokyo Indoor	Carpet	Final	Connors	6–4, 3–6, 6–0	13	5
19.	1984	Wembley Championships	Carpet	Semifinals	Lendl	6–4, 6–2	13	6
20.	1984	Masters Grand Prix	Carpet	Semifinals	Lendl	7–5, 6–7, 7–5	13	7
21.	1985	Paine Webber Classic	Hard	Final	Lendl	6–3, 6–2	13	8
22.	1985	WCT Finals	Carpet	Semifinals	Lendl	6–3, 2–1 RET	13	9
23.	1985	French Open	Clay	Semifinals	Lendl	6–2, 6–3, 6–1	13	10
24.	1985	Volvo International	Hard	Semifinals	Lendl	6–0, 4–6, 6–4	13	11
25.	1985	US Open	Hard	Semifinals	Lendl	6–2, 6–3, 7–5	13	12
26.	1986	Miami Open	Hard	Semifinals	Lendl	1–6, 6–1, 6–2, 2–6, 5–2 DEF	13	13
27.	1986	Paine Webber Classic	Hard	Final	Lendl	6–2, 6–0	13	14
28.	1986	Volvo International	Hard	Semifinals	Lendl	6–4, 3–6, 6–2	13	15
29.	1987	Miami Open	Hard	Semifinals	Lendl	3–6, 7–6^{(9–7)}, 7–6^{(11–9)}, 6–3	13	16
30.	1987	Washington Open	Hard	Semifinals	Lendl	6–4, 7–6^{(7–3)}	13	17
31.	1987	Canadian Open	Hard	Semifinals	Lendl	7–5, 6–4	13	18
32.	1987	US Open	Hard	Semifinals	Lendl	6–4, 6–2, 6–2	13	19
33.	1987	Masters Grand Prix	Carpet	Round Robin	Lendl	4–3 RET	13	20
34.	1988	Canadian Open	Hard	Semifinals	Lendl	6–4, 6–4	13	21
35.	1992	US Open	Hard	Last 64	Lendl	3–6, 6–3, 6–2, 6–0	13	22

- Note: The ABD 1984 Rotterdam final with Lendl leading 6-0, 1-0, was abandoned due to a bomb scare. There was no result.

=== Head-to-head breakdown ===
- All matches: (35) Lendl 22–13
- All finals: (7)* Connors 4–2, *(1 No Result)
  - Grand Slam matches: Lendl 4–3
  - Grand Slam finals: Connors 2–0
  - Masters matches: Lendl 4–1
  - WCT Finals matches: tied 1–1
  - Clay court matches: tied 2–2
  - Grass court matches: Connors 2–0
  - Hard court matches: Lendl 14–5
  - Indoor carpet matches: Lendl 6–4

== Other matches ==
=== Invitational matches ===
Connors–Lendl (3–8)

No.	Year	Tournament	Surface	Round	Winner	Score
1.	1981	Challenge of Champions	Carpet	Round Robin	Connors	6–2, 3–6, 6–3
2.	1982	Molson Light Challenge	Carpet	Round Robin	Lendl	6–4, 6–3
3.	1982	Challenge of Champions	Carpet	Final	Lendl	4–6, 6–4, 7–5, 6–4
4.	1983	Sun City	Hard	Final	Connors	7–5, 7–6
5.	1983	Nastase-Hamptons Invitational	Hard	Final	Connors	6–3, 7–6, 6–1
6.	1985	Hamlet Challenge Cup	Hard	Final	Lendl	6–1, 6–3
7.	1985	Meadowlands Tennis Challenge	Carpet	Semifinals	Lendl	6–1, 6–3
8.	1985	Challenge of Champions	Carpet	Round Robin	Lendl	6–3, 5–7, 6–1
9.	1985	Challenge of Champions	Carpet	Final	Lendl	6–2, 6–3
10.	1990	WCT Tournament of Champions	Hard	Quarterfinals	Lendl	3–6, 7–5, 1–0 RET
11.	1991	Transcontinental Tennis Cup	Hard	Final	Lendl	Connors retired in 3rd set

== ATP rankings ==
Note: Connors was active in 1970–1972, but the ATP rankings started in 1973.

=== Year-end ranking timeline ===
Player	1973	1974	1975	1976	1977	1978	1979	1980	1981	1982	1983	1984	1985	1986	1987	1988	1989	1990	1991	1992	1993	1994	1995	1996
Jimmy Connors	3	1	1	1	1	1	2	3	3	2	3	2	4	8	4	7	14	936	49	84	370	672	419	1300
Ivan Lendl						74	20	6	2	3	2	3	1	1	1	2	1	3	5	8	19	54		

==== ATP Year-end ranking timeline by age ====
Age at end of season

Year-end ranking	18	19	20	21	22	23	24	25	26	27	28	29	30	31	32	33	34	35	36	37	38	39	40	41	42	43	44
Jimmy Connors	No ATP rankings			3	1	1	1	1	1	2	3	3	2	3	2	4	8	4	7	14	936	49	84	370	672	419	1300
Ivan Lendl	74	20	6	2	3	2	3	1	1	1	2	1	3	5	8	19	54										

== See also ==
- Connors–McEnroe rivalry
- Lendl–McEnroe rivalry
