= 1977 Pepsi Grand Slam =

- Date: January 21–23
- Edition: 2nd
- Category: Special event
- Draw: 4S
- Prize money: $200,000
- Surface: Clay / outdoor
- Location: Boca Raton, Florida, U.S.
- Venue: Mission Hills Country Club

Champions

Singles
- (Sweden) Björn Borg
← 1976 ·	Pepsi Grand Slam	· 1978 →

The 1977 Pepsi Grand Slam, officially the Pepsi-Cola Grand Slam of Tennis, was a men's tennis tournament played on outdoor green clay courts at the Mission Hills Country Club in Boca Raton, Florida. It was an Association of Tennis Professionals (ATP) sanctioned special event that was not part of the 1977 Colgate-Palmolive Grand Prix circuit. It was the second edition of the tournament and was held from January 21 through January 23, 1977.

Björn Borg won the singles title and earned $100,000 first prize money. It was his 2nd singles title of the year and the 20th of his career. He defeated Jimmy Connors.

== Prize money ==
Event	W	F	3rd	4th
Singles	$100,000	$50,000	$30,000	$20,000

== Draw ==
Semifinals
(Sweden) Björn Borg	6	4	7
(Italy) Adriano Panatta	2	6	5
(Spain) Manuel Orantes	6	6	5^{r}
(United States) Jimmy Connors	7	2	5

Final
(Sweden) Björn Borg	6	5	6
(United States) Jimmy Connors	4	7	3

== See also ==
- Borg–Connors rivalry
