= 1982 Stella Artois Championships – Doubles =

Doubles
- 1982 Stella Artois Championships

Final
- Champions: (United States) John McEnroe (United States) Peter Rennert
- Runners-up: (United States) Victor Amaya (United States) Hank Pfister
- Score: 7–6, 7–5

Details
- Draw: 32

Events
Singles	Doubles
← 1981 ·	Queen's Club Championships	· 1983 →

Pat Du Pré and Brian Teacher were the defending champions but they competed with different partners that year, Du Pré with Lloyd Bourne and Teacher with Bruce Manson.

Bourne and Du Pré lost in the first round to Tony Graham and Matt Mitchell.

Manson and Teacher lost in the quarterfinals to Andy Andrews and John Sadri.

John McEnroe and Peter Rennert won the doubles title at the 1982 Queen's Club Championships tennis tournament defeating Victor Amaya and Hank Pfister in the final 7–6, 7–5.

== Seeds ==
1. (South Africa) Kevin Curren / (United States) Steve Denton (first round)
2. (Australia) Mark Edmondson / (Australia) Kim Warwick (first round)
3. (United States) Fritz Buehning / (United States) Peter McNamara (first round)
4. (United States) Victor Amaya / (United States) Hank Pfister (final)
5. (United States) John McEnroe / (United States) Peter Rennert (champions)
6. n/a
7. (United States) Tim Gullikson / (United States) Tom Gullikson (quarterfinals)
8. (United States) Bruce Manson / (United States) Brian Teacher (quarterfinals)

== Draw ==
=== Key ===
- Q = Qualifier
- WC = Wild card
- LL = Lucky loser
- Alt = Alternate
- SE = Special exempt
- PR = Protected ranking
- ITF = ITF entry
- JE = Junior exempt
- w/o = Walkover
- r = Retired
- d = Defaulted
- SR = Special ranking

=== Final ===
Semifinals
(United Kingdom) John Lloyd (United States) Dick Stockton	3	2
4	(United States) Victor Amaya (United States) Hank Pfister	6	6
5	(United States) John McEnroe (United States) Peter Rennert	6	7
(United States) Andy Andrews (United States) John Sadri	4	6

Final
4	(United States) Victor Amaya (United States) Hank Pfister	6	5
5	(United States) John McEnroe (United States) Peter Rennert	7	7

=== Top half ===
First round
1	(South Africa) K Curren (United States) S Denton	6	6	5
(Poland) W Fibak (Australia) J Fitzgerald	3	7	7
(United Kingdom) J Lloyd (United States) D Stockton	7	6	13
(India) A Amritraj (United Kingdom) B Mottram	6	7	11
(Australia) C Johnstone (Australia) C Miller	6	6	6
(United States) S Meister (United States) C Wittus	7	3	4
(United States) T Delatte (United States) C Hooper	7	7
LL	(United States) C Edwards (South Africa) E Edwards	6	6
4	(United States) V Amaya (United States) H Pfister	7	6
(South Africa) B Levine (South Africa) C Steyn	6	4
(United States) T Graham (United States) M Mitchell	6	6
(United States) L Bourne (United States) P Du Pré	4	4
(Australia) J Alexander (Australia) B Drewett	7	6
(United Kingdom) J Bates (United Kingdom) N Brown	6	3
(United States) M Davis (United States) C Dunk	4	4
7	(United States) Tim Gullikson (United States) Tom Gullikson	6	6

Second round
(Poland) W Fibak (Australia) J Fitzgerald	6	6
(United Kingdom) J Lloyd (United States) D Stockton	7	7
(Australia) C Johnstone (Australia) C Miller	6	3
(United States) T Delatte (United States) C Hooper	7	6
4	(United States) V Amaya (United States) H Pfister	6	6
(United States) T Graham (United States) M Mitchell	3	4
(Australia) J Alexander (Australia) B Drewett
7	(United States) Tim Gullikson (United States) Tom Gullikson	w/o

Quarterfinals
(United Kingdom) J Lloyd (United States) D Stockton	7	6
(United States) T Delatte (United States) C Hooper	6	3
4	(United States) V Amaya (United States) H Pfister	5	7	10
7	(United States) Tim Gullikson (United States) Tom Gullikson	7	6	8

Semifinals
(United Kingdom) J Lloyd (United States) D Stockton	3	2
4	(United States) V Amaya (United States) H Pfister	6	6

=== Bottom half ===
First round
5	(United States) J McEnroe (United States) P Rennert	7	6
(United States) D Gitlin (United States) B Nichols	5	4
(United States) M Estep (Australia) P Kronk	7	6
(United Kingdom) D Felgate (United States) D Ralston	6	3
(United States) V Gerulaitis (France) H Leconte	7	6
(Brazil) M Hocevar (Brazil) J Soares	6	4
(Australia) R Frawley (New Zealand) C Lewis	4	6	7
3	(United States) F Buehning (Australia) P McNamara	6	3	5
8	(United States) B Manson (United States) B Teacher	6	7	6
(New Zealand) B Derlin (Nigeria) N Odizor	7	6	3
(United Kingdom) J Feaver (United States) V Winitsky	6	6	7
(United States) G Holroyd (United States) E Sherbeck	4	7	5
(Australia) S Ball (New Zealand) R Simpson	7	7
(United Kingdom) A Jarrett (United Kingdom) J Smith	6	6
(United States) A Andrews (United States) J Sadri	4	6	11
2	(Australia) M Edmondson (Australia) K Warwick	6	3	9

Second round
5	(United States) J McEnroe (United States) P Rennert	6	6
(United States) M Estep (Australia) P Kronk	3	4
(United States) V Gerulaitis (France) H Leconte	7	6
(Australia) R Frawley (New Zealand) C Lewis	6	4
8	(United States) B Manson (United States) B Teacher	6	3	6
(United Kingdom) J Feaver (United States) V Winitsky	4	6	1
(Australia) S Ball (New Zealand) R Simpson	6	6	3
(United States) A Andrews (United States) J Sadri	7	3	6

Quarterfinals
5	(United States) J McEnroe (United States) P Rennert	6	6
(United States) V Gerulaitis (France) H Leconte	4	2
8	(United States) B Manson (United States) B Teacher	6	6	4
(United States) A Andrews (United States) J Sadri	4	7	6

Semifinals
5	(United States) J McEnroe (United States) P Rennert	6	7
(United States) A Andrews (United States) J Sadri	4	6
