= 1979 Pepsi Grand Slam =

- Date: February 10–11
- Edition: 4th
- Category: Special event
- Draw: 4S
- Prize money: $300,000
- Surface: Clay / outdoor
- Location: Boca Raton, Florida, U.S.
- Venue: Mission Hills Country Club

Champions

Singles
- (Sweden) Björn Borg
← 1978 ·	Pepsi Grand Slam	· 1980 →

The 1979 Pepsi Grand Slam, officially the Pepsi-Cola Grand Slam of Tennis, was a men's tennis tournament played on outdoor green clay courts at the Mission Hills Country Club in Boca Raton, Florida, United States It was an Association of Tennis Professionals (ATP) sanctioned special event that was not part of the 1979 Colgate-Palmolive Grand Prix circuit. It was the fourth edition of the tournament and was held from February 10 through February 11, 1979. Björn Borg won his third consecutive singles title at the event and earned $150,000 first prize money.

== Final ==
=== Singles ===
(Sweden) Björn Borg defeated (United States) Jimmy Connors 6–2, 6–3

- It was Borg's 2nd singles title of the year and the 41st of his career.

== Prize money ==
Event	W	F	3rd	4th
Singles	$150,000	$75,000	$45,000	$30,000

== Draw ==
Semifinals
(United States) Jimmy Connors	6	6
(United States) John McEnroe	3	4
(Sweden) Björn Borg	6	6
(Argentina) Guillermo Vilas	3	3

Final
(United States) Jimmy Connors	2	3
(Sweden) Björn Borg	6	6

=== Third place match ===
(United States) John McEnroe defeated (Argentina) Guillermo Vilas 6–4, 6–2

== See also ==
- Borg–Connors rivalry
