= Borg–Connors rivalry =

Tennis rivalry

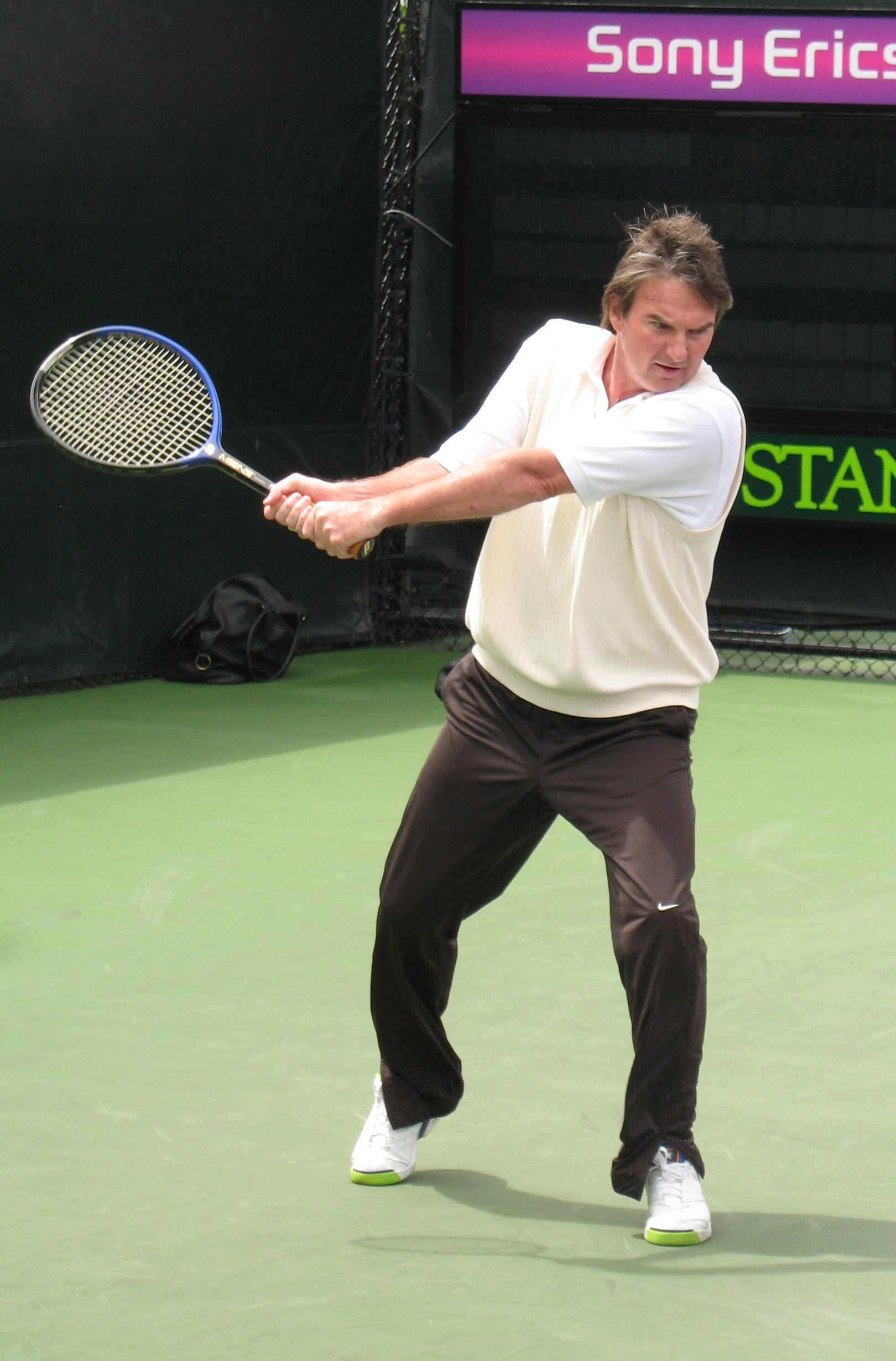
Jimmy Connors, Miami, Florida, 2007.

The Borg–Connors rivalry was a tennis rivalry between Björn Borg and Jimmy Connors. They met 23 times during their careers, and 42 times including invitational and exhibition tournaments. Borg leads 15–8 in their official head-to-head, 8–5 in finals, 5–3 in Grand Slam meetings and they are 2–2 in Grand Slam finals. Connors leads 7–3 and 8–1 in invitational and exhibition matches, respectively.

In 1975 Connors met Borg in the semifinals of the U.S. Open and defeated him in straight sets, on clay. Connors defeated Borg again at the U.S. Open again in 1976, this time in a four-set final, capturing his second U.S. Open title. In 1977 they met in the Wimbledon final, and Borg won in five sets. Borg defeated Connors at Wimbledon again in the 1978 final, this time in straight sets, to claim his third straight Wimbledon title. Two months later, Connors defeated Borg at the U.S. Open in a straight-set final on a hard surface "DecoTurf II", ending Borg's 43-match winning streak. In 1979 they met at Wimbledon again, and Borg won a straight-set semifinal. In 1981, Borg defeated Connors in a five-set semifinal at Wimbledon and a straight-set semifinal at the U.S. Open, his tenth consecutive win against Connors. Soon afterwards Borg retired from the regular tour. They faced each other three times at the season-ending Masters Championship in New York City: in January 1978 (ending the 1977 season), January 1980 (ending the 1979 season) and January 1981 (ending the 1980 season). Connors won the first meeting, Borg the latter two.

== Head-to-head ==
| Legend | Borg | Connors |
|---|---|---|
| Grand Slam | 5 | 3 |
| Masters Grand Prix | 2 | 1 |
| ATP International Series | 8 | 4 |
| Total | 15 | 8 |

=== Official matches (23) ===
Borg 15 – Connors 8

| No. | Year | Tournament | Surface | Round | Winner | Score | Borg | Connors |
|---|---|---|---|---|---|---|---|---|
| 1. | 1973 | Stockholm Open | Hard (i) | Semifinals | Borg | 6–4, 3–6, 7–6^{(7–2)} | 1 | 0 |
| 2. | 1974 | US Clay Court Championships | Clay | Final | Connors | 5–7, 6–3, 6–4 | 1 | 1 |
| 3. | 1975 | US Open | Clay | Semifinals | Connors | 7–5, 7–5, 7–5 | 1 | 2 |
| 4. | 1975 | Stockholm Open | Hard (i) | Semifinals | Connors | 6–2, 7–6^{(7–2)} | 1 | 3 |
| 5. | 1976 | US Pro Indoor | Carpet | Final | Connors | 7–6^{(7–5)}, 6–4, 6–0 | 1 | 4 |
| 6. | 1976 | Indian Wells Masters | Hard | Semifinals | Connors | 6–4, 6–1 | 1 | 5 |
| 7. | 1976 | US Open | Clay | Final | Connors | 6–4, 3–6, 7–6^{(11–9)}, 6–4 | 1 | 6 |
| 8. | 1977 | Pepsi Grand Slam | Clay | Final | Borg | 6–4, 5–7, 6–3 | 2 | 6 |
| 9. | 1977 | Wimbledon | Grass | Final | Borg | 3–6, 6–2, 6–1, 5–7, 6–4 | 3 | 6 |
| 10. | 1977 | Masters Grand Prix | Carpet | Final | Connors | 6–4, 1–6, 6–4 | 3 | 7 |
| 11. | 1978 | Pepsi Grand Slam | Clay | Final | Borg | 7–6^{(7–1)}, 3–6, 6–1 | 4 | 7 |
| 12. | 1978 | Wimbledon | Grass | Final | Borg | 6–2, 6–2, 6–3 | 5 | 7 |
| 13. | 1978 | US Open | Hard | Final | Connors | 6–4, 6–2, 6–2 | 5 | 8 |
| 14. | 1979 | Pepsi Grand Slam | Clay | Final | Borg | 6–2, 6–3 | 6 | 8 |
| 15. | 1979 | Alan King Tennis Classic | Hard | Final | Borg | 6–3, 6–2 | 7 | 8 |
| 16. | 1979 | Wimbledon | Grass | Semifinals | Borg | 6–2, 6–3, 6–2 | 8 | 8 |
| 17. | 1979 | Tokyo Indoor | Carpet | Final | Borg | 6–2, 6–2 | 9 | 8 |
| 18. | 1979 | WCT Challenge Cup | Carpet | Final | Borg | 6–4, 6–2, 2–6, 6–4 | 10 | 8 |
| 19. | 1979 | Masters Grand Prix | Carpet | Round Robin | Borg | 3–6, 6–3, 7–6^{(7–4)} | 11 | 8 |
| 20. | 1980 | WCT Invitational | Carpet | Round Robin | Borg | 6–3, 6–1 | 12 | 8 |
| 21. | 1980 | Masters Grand Prix | Carpet | Semifinals | Borg | 6–4, 6–7^{(4–7)}, 6–3 | 13 | 8 |
| 22. | 1981 | Wimbledon | Grass | Semifinals | Borg | 0–6, 4–6, 6–3, 6–0, 6–4 | 14 | 8 |
| 23. | 1981 | US Open | Hard | Semifinals | Borg | 6–2, 7–5, 6–4 | 15 | 8 |

== Breakdown of their rivalry ==
- All matches: (23) Borg, 15–8
- All finals: Borg, 8–5
  - Clay court matches: Tied, 3–3
  - Grass court matches: Borg, 4–0
  - Indoor matches: Borg, 6–3
  - Outdoor hard court matches: Tied, 2–2
  - Grand Slam matches: Borg, 5–3
  - Grand Slam finals: Tied, 2–2
  - Masters matches: Borg, 2–1
  - Masters finals: Connors, 1–0

== Other matches ==
=== Invitational matches ===
Borg–Connors (3–7)

| No. | Year | Tournament | Surface | Round | Winner | Score |
|---|---|---|---|---|---|---|
| 1. | 1976 | Caracas | Carpet | Round Robin | Connors | 6–4, 5–7, 6–3 |
| 2. | 1978 | Suntory Cup, Tokyo | Carpet | Final | Borg | 6–1, 6–2 |
| 3. | 1978 | Buenos Aires | Carpet | Final | Connors | 5–7, 6–3, 6–3 |
| 4. | 1979 | Frankfurt | Carpet | Final | Borg | 6–3, 4–6, 6–3, 6–4 |
| 5. | 1980 | Europe vs. USA, Copenhagen | Carpet | Round Robin | Connors | 6–4, 6–2 |
| 6. | 1980 | Molson Light Challenge, Toronto | Carpet | Round Robin | Connors | 7–5, 6–3 |
| 7. | 1982 | Michelob Light Cup, Industry Hills | Hard | Final | Connors | 5–7, 6–2, 6–2, 6–7^{(5–7)}, 6–2 |
| 8. | 1982 | Molson Light Challenge, Montreal | Carpet | Final | Connors | 6–4, 6–3 |
| 9. | 1982 | Challenge of Champions, Chicago | Carpet | Round Robin | Borg | 6–4, 1–6, 6–2 |
| 10. | 1983 | Suntory Cup, Tokyo | Carpet | Final | Connors | 6–3, 6–4 |

=== Exhibitions ===
Borg–Connors (1–8)

| No. | Year | Tournament | Surface | Winner | Score |
|---|---|---|---|---|---|
| 1. | 1982 | Richmond | Hard | Connors | 6–4, 3–6, 7–5, 6–3 |
| 2. | 1982 | Ottawa | Carpet | Borg | 1–6, 6–3, 6–3, 1–6, 6–2 |
| 3. | 1982 | Seattle | Carpet | Connors | 6–4, 3–6, 7–5 |
| 4. | 1982 | Los Angeles | Carpet | Connors | 6–3, 2–6, 6–2 |
| 5. | 1982 | Vancouver | Carpet | Connors | 6–2, 5–7, 6–4 |
| 6. | 1982 | San Francisco | Carpet | Connors | 7–5, 7–6^{(8–6)} |
| 7. | 1983 | Baton Rouge | Carpet | Connors | 6–7^{(4–7)}, 6–4, 6–4 |
| 8. | 1983 | Providence | Carpet | Connors | 6–4, 6–4 |
| 9. | 1983 | Seoul | Carpet | Connors | 5–7, 6–1, 4–6, 6–4, 7–6^{(7–3)} |

== See also ==
- Borg–McEnroe rivalry
- Connors–Lendl rivalry
- Connors–McEnroe rivalry
- List of tennis rivalries
