= 1987 Atlanta AT&T Challenge of Champions =

- 1987 Atlanta AT&T Challenge of Champions

Final
- Champion: (United States) John McEnroe
- Runner-up: (United States) Paul Annacone
- Score: 6–4, 7–5
← 1986 ·	Challenge of Champions	· 1988 →

The 1987 Atlanta AT&T Challenge of Champions was a tennis tournament in 1987. It was won by John McEnroe,6–4, 7–5 against Paul Annacone.

== Players ==
1. (United States) John McEnroe (champion)
2. (United States) Paul Annacone (final)
3. (Czechoslovakia) Ivan Lendl (semifinals)
4. (Sweden) Jimmy Connors (semifinals)
5. (Czechoslovakia) Miloslav Mečíř (round-robin)
6. (Sweden) Stefan Edberg (round-robin)
7. (Sweden) Mikael Pernfors (round-robin)
8. (Sweden) Ulf Stenlund (round-robin)

== Draw ==
=== Finals ===
Semi-finals
(Czechoslovakia) Ivan Lendl	3	2
(United States) Paul Annacone	6	6
(United States) John McEnroe	6	6
(United States) Jimmy Connors	4	4

Final
(United States) Paul Annacone	4	5
(United States) John McEnroe	6	7

=== Group A ===
	(Czechoslovakia) Ivan Lendl	(United States) John McEnroe	(Czechoslovakia) Miloslav Mečíř	(Sweden) Mikael Pernfors	RR W–L	Set W–L	Game W–L	Standings
(Czechoslovakia) Ivan Lendl		5–7, 6–4, 7–6(2)	6–0, 6–4	6–3, 6–3	3-0	6-1	42-27	1
(United States) John McEnroe	7–5, 4–6, 6–7(2)		7–5, 7–6(5)	6–2, 6–3	2-1	5-2	43-34	2
(Czechoslovakia) Miloslav Mečíř	0–6, 4–6	5–7, 6–7(5)		7–6(3), 6–4	1-2	2-4	28-36	3
(Sweden) Mikael Pernfors	3–6, 3–6	2–6, 3–6	6–7(3), 4–6		0-3	0-6	21-37	4

=== Group B ===
	(United States) Jimmy Connors	(United States) Paul Annacone	(Sweden) Stefan Edberg	(Sweden) Ulf Stenlund	RR W–L	Set W–L	Game W–L	Standings
(United States) Jimmy Connors		6–1, 6–4	4–6, 7–5, 6–3	6–1, 6–0	3-0	6-1	41-20	1
(United States) Paul Annacone	1–6, 4–6		6–2, 6–3	6–1, 6–0	2-1	4-2	29-18	2
(Sweden) Stefan Edberg	6–4, 5–7, 3–6	2–6, 3–6		4–6, 7–5, 6–1	1-2	3-5	36-41	3
(Sweden) Anders Järryd	1–6, 0–6	1–6, 0–6	6–4, 5–7, 1-6		0-3	1-6	14-41	4
