= 1984 Las Vegas AT&T Challenge of Champions =

- 1984 Las Vegas AT&T Challenge of Champions

Final
- Champion: (United States) John McEnroe
- Runner-up: (Argentina) Guillermo Vilas
- Score: 7–5, 6–0
← 1983 ·	Challenge of Champions	· 1985 →

The 1984 Las Vegas AT&T Challenge of Champions was a tennis tournament held in 1984 at the Thomas & Mack Center in Paradise, Nevada. It was won by John McEnroe, 7–5, 6–0 against Guillermo Vilas.

== Players ==
1. (United States) John McEnroe (champion)
2. (Argentina) Guillermo Vilas (final)
3. (France) Yannick Noah (3rd place)
4. (United States) Jimmy Connors (4th place)
5. (Czechoslovakia) Ivan Lendl (round-robin)
6. (United States) Vitas Gerulaitis (round-robin)
7. (United States) Jimmy Arias (round-robin)
8. (South Africa) Johan Kriek (round-robin)

== Draw ==
=== Finals ===
3rd place match
(United States) Jimmy Connors	6^{16}	6^{4}
(France) Yannick Noah	7^{18}	7^{7}

Final
(United States) John McEnroe	7	6
(Argentina) Guillermo Vilas	5	0

=== Group A ===
	(United States) John McEnroe	(United States) Jimmy Connors	(United States) Jimmy Arias	(South Africa) Johan Kriek	RR W–L	Set W–L	Points	Standings
(United States) John McEnroe		6–3, 4–6, 6–2	4–6, 6–3, 6–2	5–7, 6–4, 6–3	3-0	6-3		1
(United States) Jimmy Connors	3–6, 6–4, 2–6		6–0, 7–5	6–3, 6–1	2-1	5-2		2
(United States) Jimmy Arias	6–4, 3–6, 2–6	0–6, 5–7		6–3, 2–6, 6–4	1-2	3-5		3
(South Africa) Johan Kriek	7–5, 4–6, 3–6	3–6, 1–6	3–6, 6–2, 4–6		0-3	0-6		4

=== Group B ===
	(Argentina) Guillermo Vilas	(France) Yannick Noah	(Czechoslovakia) Ivan Lendl	(United States) Vitas Gerulaitis	RR W–L	Set W–L	Points	Standings
(Argentina) Guillermo Vilas		5–7, 7–6(7), 6–4	6–4, 7–5	4–6, 7–5, 3–6	2-1	5-3		1
(France) Yannick Noah	7–5, 6–7(7), 4–6		7–6(5), 6–7(5), 6–1	6–3, 2–6, 6–4	2-1	5-4		2
(Czechoslovakia) Ivan Lendl	4–6, 5–7	6–7(5), 7–6(5), 1–6		6–4, 6–4	1-2	3-4		3
(United States) Vitas Gerulaitis	6–4, 5–7, 6–3	3–6, 6–2, 4–6	4–6, 4–6		1-2	3-5		4

Standings were determined by: 1) A points system, with players receiving 1 point for each set won, and a further 1 point for each match won; and 2) In two-player ties, head-to-head records. The players finishing in 1st place in each group reach the final, while the players finishing in 2nd place progressed into a 3rd place match.
