= 1985 Atlanta AT&T Challenge of Champions =

- 1985 Atlanta AT&T Challenge of Champions

Final
- Champion: (Czechoslovakia) Ivan Lendl
- Runner-up: (United States) Jimmy Connors
- Score: 6–2, 6–3
← 1984 ·	Challenge of Champions	· 1986 →

The 1985 Atlanta AT&T Challenge of Champions was a tennis tournament in 1985. It was won by Ivan Lendl, 6–2, 6–3 against Jimmy Connors.

== Players ==
1. (Czechoslovakia) Ivan Lendl (champion)
2. (United States) Jimmy Connors (final)
3. (United States) John McEnroe (semifinals)
4. (Sweden) Stefan Edberg (semifinals)
5. (France) Yannick Noah (round-robin)
6. (South Africa) Kevin Curren (round-robin)
7. (Ecuador) Andrés Gómez (round-robin)
8. (Sweden) Anders Järryd (round-robin)

== Draw ==
=== Finals ===
Semi-finals
(Czechoslovakia) Ivan Lendl	7^{7}	6
(United States) John McEnroe	6^{4}	3
(United States) Jimmy Connors	6	6
(Sweden) Stefan Edberg	3	3

Final
(Czechoslovakia) Ivan Lendl	6	6
(United States) Jimmy Connors	2	3

=== Group A ===
	(Czechoslovakia) Ivan Lendl	(United States) Jimmy Connors	(France) Yannick Noah	(Ecuador) Andrés Gómez	RR W–L	Set W–L	Game W–L	Standings
(Czechoslovakia) Ivan Lendl		6–3, 5–7, 6–1	6–3, 6–7(4), 7–6(8)	7–6(1), 6–1	3-0	6-2	49-34	1
(United States) Jimmy Connors	3–6, 7–5, 1–6		6–4, 7–6(5)	6–0, 3–6, 6–2	2-1	5-3	39-35	2
(France) Yannick Noah	3–6, 7–6(4), 6–7(8)	4–6, 6–7(5)		3–6, 6–3, 6–2	1-2	3-5	41-43	3
(Ecuador) Andrés Gómez	6–7(1), 1–6	0–6, 6–3, 2–6	6–3, 3–6, 2–6		0-3	2-6	26-43	4

=== Group B ===
	(Sweden) Stefan Edberg	(United States) John McEnroe	(South Africa) Kevin Curren	(Sweden) Anders Järryd	RR W–L	Set W–L	Game W–L	Standings
(Sweden) Stefan Edberg		6–3, 7–6(6)	6–4, 6–4	6–3, 3–6, 6–7(4)	2-1	5-2	40-33	1
(United States) John McEnroe	3–6, 6–7(6)		7–6(5), 6–1	6–3, 6–2	2-1	4-2	34-25	2
(South Africa) Kevin Curren	4–6, 4–6	6–7(5), 1–6		6–4, 6–1	1-2	2-4	27-30	3
(Sweden) Anders Järryd	3–6, 6–3, 7–6(4)	3–6, 2–6	4–6, 1-6		1-2	2-5	26-39	4
