= 1982 Stella Artois Championships =

- Date: 7–13 June
- Edition: 80th
- Category: Grand Prix
- Draw: 64S / 32D
- Prize money: $150,000
- Surface: Grass / outdoor
- Location: London, United Kingdom
- Venue: Queen's Club

Champions

Singles
- (United States) Jimmy Connors

Doubles
- (United States) John McEnroe / (United States) Peter Rennert
- Queen's Club Championships

The 1982 Stella Artois Championships, also known as the Queen's Club Championships, was a men's tennis tournament played on outdoor grass courts at the Queen's Club in London in the United Kingdom that was part of the 1982 Volvo Grand Prix circuit. It was the 80th edition of the tournament and was held from 7 June through 13 June 1982. Second-seeded Jimmy Connors won the singles title.

== Finals ==
=== Singles ===
(United States) Jimmy Connors defeated (United States) John McEnroe 7–5, 6–3

- It was Connors' 4th title of the year and the 106th of his career.

=== Doubles ===
(United States) John McEnroe / (United States) Peter Rennert defeated (United States) Victor Amaya / (United States) Hank Pfister 7–6, 7–5

- It was McEnroe's 4th title of the year and the 77th of his career. It was Rennert's 1st title of the year and the 1st of his career.

== See also ==
- Connors–McEnroe rivalry
