= 1984 Stella Artois Championships – Doubles =

Doubles
- 1984 Stella Artois Championships

Final
- Champions: (Australia) Pat Cash (Australia) Paul McNamee
- Runners-up: (South Africa) Bernard Mitton (United States) Butch Walts
- Score: 6–4, 6–3

Details
- Draw: 32
- Seeds: 8

Events
Singles	Doubles
- Queen's Club Championships

Brian Gottfried and Paul McNamee were the defending champions but they competed with different partners that year, Gottfried with Mike Leach and McNamee with Pat Cash.

Gottfried and Leach lost in the first round to Andy Kohlberg and David Pate.

Cash and McNamee won in the final 6–4, 6–3 against Bernard Mitton and Butch Walts.

== Seeds ==
1. (Australia) Mark Edmondson / (United States) Sherwood Stewart (second round)
2. (South Africa) Kevin Curren / (United States) Steve Denton (semifinals)
3. (Australia) Pat Cash / (Australia) Paul McNamee (champions)
4. (Brazil) Carlos Kirmayr / (Brazil) Cássio Motta (second round)
5. (South Africa) Bernard Mitton / (United States) Butch Walts (final)
6. (Australia) John Alexander / (Australia) John Fitzgerald (first round)
7. (United States) Tony Giammalva / (United States) Steve Meister (quarterfinals)
8. (Australia) Broderick Dyke / (Australia) Wally Masur (second round)

== Draw ==
Key

- Q = Qualifier
- WC = Wild card
- LL = Lucky loser
- Alt = Alternate
- ITF = ITF entry
- PR = Protected ranking
- SR = Special ranking
- SE = Special exempt
- JE = Junior exempt
- JR = Junior Accelerator Programme entrant
- CO = College Accelerator Programme entrant
- NG = Next Gen Accelerator Program entrant
- w/o = Walkover
- r = Retired
- d = Defaulted

=== Final ===
Semifinals
(United States) Martin Davis (United States) Chris Dunk	7	4	2
3	(Australia) Pat Cash (Australia) Paul McNamee	6	6	6
5	(South Africa) Bernard Mitton (United States) Butch Walts	6	7
2	(South Africa) Kevin Curren (United States) Steve Denton	4	6

Final
3	(Australia) Pat Cash (Australia) Paul McNamee	6	6
5	(South Africa) Bernard Mitton (United States) Butch Walts	4	3

=== Top half ===
First round
1	(Australia) M Edmondson (United States) S Stewart	6	7	6
(United States) A Andrews (United States) J Sadri	7	5	4
(United States) V Amaya (United States) H Pfister	7	1	3
(United States) D Dowlen (Nigeria) N Odizor	6	6	6
(United States) M Davis (United States) C Dunk	5	7	6
(United States) D Gitlin (United Kingdom) J Lloyd	7	6	4
(Australia) C Miller (United States) M Mitchell	3	1
8	(Australia) B Dyke (Australia) W Masur	6	6
3	(Australia) P Cash (Australia) P McNamee	6	3	17
(United States) J McEnroe (United States) P Rennert	3	6	15
(United Kingdom) J Bates (United Kingdom) J Dier	6	6	4
(Australia) W Hampson (United States) J Mattke	7	3	6
(South Africa) E Edwards (South Africa) D Visser	4	4
(United States) K Flach (United States) R Seguso	6	6
(Australia) B Drewett (Australia) K Warwick	7	7
6	(Australia) J Alexander (Australia) J Fitzgerald	5	6

Second round
1	(Australia) M Edmondson (United States) S Stewart	6	6
(United States) D Dowlen (Nigeria) N Odizor	7	7
(United States) M Davis (United States) C Dunk	7	6
8	(Australia) B Dyke (Australia) W Masur	6	4
3	(Australia) P Cash (Australia) P McNamee	7	6
(Australia) W Hampson (United States) J Mattke	6	2
(United States) K Flach (United States) R Seguso	4	7	6
(Australia) B Drewett (Australia) K Warwick	6	5	8

Quarterfinals
(United States) D Dowlen (Nigeria) N Odizor	3	4
(United States) M Davis (United States) C Dunk	6	6
3	(Australia) P Cash (Australia) P McNamee	6	6	10
(Australia) B Drewett (Australia) K Warwick	7	1	8

Semifinals
(United States) M Davis (United States) C Dunk	7	4	2
3	(Australia) P Cash (Australia) P McNamee	6	6	6

=== Bottom half ===
First round
5	(South Africa) B Mitton (United States) B Walts	w/o
(United States) J Arias (United States) E Korita
(Paraguay) F González (South Africa) C van Rensburg	4	6	15
(Sweden) S Edberg (New Zealand) C Lewis	6	1	13
(United States) L Bourne (United States) R Van't Hof	6	6	7
(Australia) D Graham (Australia) L Warder	7	3	9
(United States) C Hooper (United States) V Winitsky	6	6	6
4	(Brazil) C Kirmayr (Brazil) C Motta	3	7	8
7	(United States) T Giammalva (United States) S Meister	7	6	6
(United States) G Donnelly (United States) C B Strode	6	7	3
(United States) A Kohlberg (United States) D Pate	7	6
(United States) B Gottfried (United States) M Leach	6	3
(United States) S Davis (United States) B Teacher	3	6	6
(India) A Amritraj (United States) M Purcell	6	1	4
(Brazil) M Hocevar (United States) R Meyer	6	4
2	(South Africa) K Curren (United States) S Denton	7	6

Second round
5	(South Africa) B Mitton (United States) B Walts	7	7
(Paraguay) F González (South Africa) C van Rensburg	5	6
(Australia) D Graham (Australia) L Warder	6	6
4	(Brazil) C Kirmayr (Brazil) C Motta	4	4
7	(United States) T Giammalva (United States) S Meister	6	7
(United States) A Kohlberg (United States) D Pate	4	5
(United States) S Davis (United States) B Teacher	4	2
2	(South Africa) K Curren (United States) S Denton	6	6

Quarterfinals
5	(South Africa) B Mitton (United States) B Walts	3	7	6
(Australia) D Graham (Australia) L Warder	6	6	4
7	(United States) T Giammalva (United States) S Meister	3	4
2	(South Africa) K Curren (United States) S Denton	6	6

Semifinals
5	(South Africa) B Mitton (United States) B Walts	6	7
2	(South Africa) K Curren (United States) S Denton	4	6
