= 1981 Pepsi Grand Slam =

- Date: February 14–15
- Edition: 6th
- Category: Special event
- Draw: 4S
- Prize money: $300,000
- Surface: Clay / outdoor
- Location: Boca Raton, Florida, U.S.
- Venue: Boca West Country Club

Champions

Singles
- (United States) John McEnroe
← 1980 ·	Pepsi Grand Slam

The 1981 Pepsi Grand Slam was a men's tennis tournament played on outdoor clay courts at the Boca West Country Club in Boca Raton, Florida, United States. It was a special event, not part of the 1980 Volvo Grand Prix circuit but the title is recognized by the Association of Tennis Professionals (ATP). It was the sixth and last edition of the tournament and was held from February 14 through February 15, 1981. Four–time winner and defending champion Björn Borg withdrew a day before the tournament began after coming down with the flu. He was replaced by Vitas Gerulaitis. John McEnroe won the singles title and $150,000 first prize money.

This tournament was televised by CBS Sports immediately following their telecast of the 1981 Daytona 500 held some 220 miles further north up Florida's coast in Daytona Beach, Florida.

== Final ==
=== Singles ===
(United States) John McEnroe defeated (Argentina) Guillermo Vilas 6–7^{(5–7)}, 6–4, 6–0

== Prize money ==
Event	W	F	3rd	4th
Singles	$150,000	$75,000	$45,000	$30,000

== Draw ==
Semifinals
(Argentina) Guillermo Vilas	6	2	6
(United States) Vitas Gerulaitis	3	6	4
(United States) John McEnroe	6	6
(United States) Brian Teacher	3	1

Final
(Argentina) Guillermo Vilas	7	4	0
(United States) John McEnroe	6	6	6
