= 1984 Stella Artois Championships =

- Date: 11–18 June
- Edition: 82nd
- Category: Grand Prix
- Draw: 64S / 32D
- Prize money: $200,000
- Surface: Grass / outdoor
- Location: London, United Kingdom
- Venue: Queen's Club

Champions

Singles
- (United States) John McEnroe

Doubles
- (Australia) Pat Cash / (Australia) Paul McNamee
- Queen's Club Championships

The 1984 Stella Artois Championships was a men's tennis tournament played on grass courts at the Queen's Club in London in the United Kingdom that was part of the 1984 Volvo Grand Prix. It was the 82nd edition of the tournament and was held from 11 June until 18 June 1984. First-seeded John McEnroe won the singles title, his fourth at the event after 1979–1981.

== Finals ==
=== Singles ===
(United States) John McEnroe defeated (United States) Leif Shiras 6–1, 3–6, 6–2

- It was McEnroe's 7th singles title of the year and the 53rd of his career.

=== Doubles ===
(Australia) Pat Cash / (Australia) Paul McNamee defeated (South Africa) Bernard Mitton / (United States) Butch Walts 6–4, 6–3

- It was Cash's 4th title of the year and the 10th of his career. It was McNamee's 4th title of the year and the 26th of his career.
