= 1984 Stella Artois Championships – Singles =

Singles
- 1984 Stella Artois Championships

Final
- Champion: (United States) John McEnroe
- Runner-up: (United States) Leif Shiras
- Score: 6–1, 3–6, 6–2

Details
- Draw: 64
- Seeds: 16

Events
Singles	Doubles
← 1983 ·	Queen's Club Championships	· 1985 →

Jimmy Connors was the defending champion but lost in the semifinals to John McEnroe.

John McEnroe won the singles title at the 1984 Queen's Club Championships tennis tournament defeating compatriot Leif Shiras in the final 6–1, 3–6, 6–2.

== Seeds ==
1. (United States) John McEnroe (champion)
2. (Czechoslovakia) Ivan Lendl (first round)
3. (United States) Jimmy Connors (semifinals)
4. (France) Yannick Noah (first round)
5. (South Africa) Kevin Curren (third round)
6. (United States) Bill Scanlon (first round)
7. (United States) Tim Mayotte (quarterfinals)
8. (New Zealand) Chris Lewis (first round)
9. (Sweden) Stefan Edberg (first round)
10. (United States) Mel Purcell (second round)
11. (United States) Scott Davis (second round)
12. (France) Henri Leconte (first round)
13. (Australia) Pat Cash (third round)
14. (United States) Brian Gottfried (first round)
15. (United States) Brian Teacher (third round)
16. (Australia) John Fitzgerald (second round)

== Draw ==
=== Key ===
- Q = Qualifier
- WC = Wild card
- LL = Lucky loser
- Alt = Alternate
- SE = Special exempt
- PR = Protected ranking
- ITF = ITF entry
- JE = Junior exempt
- w/o = Walkover
- r = Retired
- d = Defaulted
- SR = Special ranking

=== Finals ===
Semifinals
1	(United States) John McEnroe	6	6
3	(United States) Jimmy Connors	2	2
Q	(United States) Rodney Harmon	3	4
(United States) Leif Shiras	6	6

Final
1	(United States) John McEnroe	6	3	6
(United States) Leif Shiras	1	6	2

=== Top half ===
==== Section 1 ====
First round
1	(United States) J McEnroe	7	6
(United States) M Davis	6	3
Q	(Australia) C Miller	5	6	4
(United States) V Winitsky	7	2	6
(United States) S Meister	5	7	8
(United States) J Sadri	7	6	6
Q	(United States) C Dunk	4	3
10	(United States) M Purcell	6	6
13	(Australia) P Cash	6	6
(United States) T Giammalva	2	4
(Brazil) C Motta	7	6
(United Kingdom) J Lloyd	6	1
(Italy) S Colombo	6	7
Q	(United States) P Rennert	3	6
(South Africa) D Visser	6	6
6	(United States) B Scanlon	3	4

Second round
1	(United States) J McEnroe	7	6
(United States) V Winitsky	5	0
(United States) S Meister	7	7
10	(United States) M Purcell	6	6
13	(Australia) P Cash	6	6
(Brazil) C Motta	3	3
(Italy) S Colombo	6	4	7
(South Africa) D Visser	4	6	9

Third round
1	(United States) J McEnroe	6	6
(United States) S Meister	4	3
13	(Australia) P Cash	6	7	4
(South Africa) D Visser	7	5	6

Quarterfinals
1	(United States) J McEnroe	6	6
(South Africa) D Visser	3	4

==== Section 2 ====
First round
3	(United States) J Connors	6	4	6
(South Africa) B Mitton	3	6	3
(Chile) R Acuña	6	6
Q	(United States) J Lapidus	2	4
(United States) S Denton	6	7
(Australia) B Drewett	2	6
Q	(Australia) J Frawley	2	5
11	(United States) S Davis	6	7
16	(Australia) J Fitzgerald	7	6
(Australia) J Alexander	6	3
(United States) G Holmes	4	6	9
(United Kingdom) S Bale	6	3	7
(South Africa) D Tarr	3	4
(United Kingdom) J Smith	6	6
(Brazil) J Soares	4	5
7	(United States) T Mayotte	6	7

Second round
3	(United States) J Connors	6	6
(Chile) R Acuña	1	3
(United States) S Denton	7	7
11	(United States) S Davis	5	6
16	(Australia) J Fitzgerald	6	7	1
(United States) G Holmes	7	5	6
(United Kingdom) J Smith	4	6	1
7	(United States) T Mayotte	6	3	6

Third round
3	(United States) J Connors	6	3	9
(United States) S Denton	4	6	7
(United States) G Holmes	4	7	5
7	(United States) T Mayotte	6	6	7

Quarterfinals
3	(United States) J Connors	7	1	8
7	(United States) T Mayotte	6	6	6

=== Bottom half ===
==== Section 3 ====
First round
5	(South Africa) K Curren	6	6
(Australia) W Masur	3	2
(United States) M Leach	6	3
(United Kingdom) S Shaw	7	6
Q	(New Zealand) R Simpson	6	7
(United States) D Pate	1	5
(United States) L Bourne	6	1	11
12	(France) H Leconte	4	6	9
15	(United States) B Gottfried	6	4	1
(Australia) P McNamee	4	6	6
Q	(United States) R Harmon	6	6	7
(United States) H Pfister	7	4	5
(United Kingdom) J Bates	7	1	4
(Nigeria) N Odizor	6	6	6
(United States) R Van't Hof	4	6	1
4	(France) Y Noah	6	3	1^{r}

Second round
5	(South Africa) K Curren	6	6
(United Kingdom) S Shaw	4	2
Q	(New Zealand) R Simpson	7	7
(United States) L Bourne	5	6
(Australia) P McNamee	2	7	0
Q	(United States) R Harmon	6	5	6
(Nigeria) N Odizor	6	6
(United States) R Van't Hof	4	4

Third round
5	(South Africa) K Curren	2	6
Q	(New Zealand) R Simpson	6	7
Q	(United States) R Harmon	6	7	6
(Nigeria) N Odizor	7	6	3

Quarterfinals
Q	(New Zealand) R Simpson	4	5
Q	(United States) R Harmon	6	7

==== Section 4 ====
First round
8	(New Zealand) C Lewis	6	5
Q	(France) G Forget	7	7
(United States) E Korita	4	2
(United States) B Testerman	6	6
(Brazil) G Barbosa	4	6	5
(United States) M Mitchell	6	3	7
(India) R Krishnan	6	7	6
9	(Sweden) S Edberg	7	6	3
15	(United States) B Teacher	6	5	11
(United States) J Borowiak	4	7	9
(Australia) M Edmondson	6	7
(Canada) G Michibata	2	5
(United States) C Hooper	3	7	6
(United States) T Moor	6	6	2
(United States) L Shiras	7	6
2	(Czechoslovakia) I Lendl	5	3

Second round
Q	(France) G Forget	7	5	6
(United States) B Testerman	5	7	3
(United States) M Mitchell	2	4
(India) R Krishnan	6	6
15	(United States) B Teacher	7	7
(Australia) M Edmondson	6	6
(United States) C Hooper	6	6	5
(United States) L Shiras	4	7	7

Third round
Q	(France) G Forget	3	6	6
(India) R Krishnan	6	1	2
15	(United States) B Teacher	6	4	7
(United States) L Shiras	4	6	9

Quarterfinals
Q	(France) G Forget	4	5
(United States) L Shiras	6	7
