= 1981 Stella Artois Championships – Singles =

Singles
- 1981 Stella Artois Championships

Final
- Champion: (United States) John McEnroe
- Runner-up: (United States) Brian Gottfried
- Score: 7–6, 7–5

Details
- Draw: 64
- Seeds: 16

Events
Singles	Doubles
← 1980 ·	Queen's Club Championships	· 1982 →

John McEnroe was the defending champion and was seeded no.1. He won the singles title at the 1981 Queen's Club Championships tennis tournament defeating compatriot Brian Gottfried in the final 7–6, 7–5.

== Seeds ==
1. (United States) John McEnroe (champion)
2. (United States) Roscoe Tanner (third round)
3. (United States) Brian Gottfried (final)
4. (United States) Brian Teacher (semifinals)
5. (United States) John Sadri (semifinals)
6. (India) Vijay Amritraj (first round)
7. (United States) Fritz Buehning (first round)
8. (Australia) Paul McNamee (first round)
9. (United States) Bill Scanlon (third round)
10. (United States) Victor Amaya (third round)
11. (South Africa) Kevin Curren (quarterfinals)
12. (Mexico) Raúl Ramírez (first round)
13. (Australia) Phil Dent (third round)
14. (United States) Pat Du Pré (first round)
15. (New Zealand) Chris Lewis (first round)
16. (United States) John Austin (third round)

== Draw ==
=== Key ===
- Q = Qualifier
- WC = Wild card
- LL = Lucky loser
- Alt = Alternate
- SE = Special exempt
- PR = Protected ranking
- ITF = ITF entry
- JE = Junior exempt
- w/o = Walkover
- r = Retired
- d = Defaulted
- SR = Special ranking

=== Finals ===
Semifinals
1	(United States) John McEnroe	6	6
4	(United States) Brian Teacher	3	4
3	(United States) Brian Gottfried	7	6
5	(United States) John Sadri	5	3

Final
1	(United States) John McEnroe	7	7
3	(United States) Brian Gottfried	6	5

=== Top half ===
==== Section 1 ====
First round
1	(United States) J McEnroe	6	6
(United Kingdom) J Feaver	1	2
(United Kingdom) R Drysdale	1	5
(Australia) M Edmondson	6	7
(South Africa) B Mitton	6	6
(United States) P Fleming	7	7
(Australia) R Case	4	6	3
9	(United States) B Scanlon	6	3	6
14	(United States) P Du Pré	6	5
(United States) H Pfister	7	7
(United States) D Stockton	6	7
(Australia) B Drewett	3	6
(United States) B Martin	6	7
(Australia) P Serret	3	6
(United States) T Gullikson	6	5	6
6	(India) V Amritraj	3	7	3

Second round
1	(United States) J McEnroe	6	6
(Australia) M Edmondson	3	3
(United States) P Fleming	2	3
9	(United States) B Scanlon	6	6
(United States) H Pfister	6	2	6
(United States) D Stockton	2	6	4
(United States) B Martin	6	6
(United States) T Gullikson	4	2

Third round
1	(United States) J McEnroe	6	6
9	(United States) B Scanlon	3	2
(United States) H Pfister	7	6
(United States) B Martin	5	4

Quarterfinals
1	(United States) J McEnroe	6	7
(United States) H Pfister	2	5

==== Section 2 ====
First round
4	(United States) B Teacher	6	7
(Australia) D Carter	4	6
(France) C Roger-Vasselin	2	6
(United Kingdom) J Lloyd	6	7
(Australia) P Kronk	4	7	6
(United States) S Denton	6	6	4
(United States) T Wilkison	7	6	4
16	(United States) J Austin	6	7	6
12	(Mexico) R Ramírez	4	4
(United States) S McCain	6	6
(United Kingdom) J Smith	6	6
(France) G Moretton	2	2
(United States) R Van't Hof	6	6	9
(Australia) D Collings	3	7	11
(United States) P Rennert	2	6	6
7	(United States) F Buehning	6	3	4

Second round
4	(United States) B Teacher	6	6
(United Kingdom) J Lloyd	1	2
(Australia) P Kronk	6	2	7
16	(United States) J Austin	2	6	9
(United States) S McCain	5	6	7
(United Kingdom) J Smith	7	2	5
(Australia) D Collings	6	6
(United States) P Rennert	7	7

Third round
4	(United States) B Teacher	6	6
16	(United States) J Austin	4	1
(United States) S McCain	3	4
(United States) P Rennert	6	6

Quarterfinals
4	(United States) B Teacher	6	6
(United States) P Rennert	1	4

=== Bottom half ===
==== Section 3 ====
First round
8	(Australia) P McNamee	7	5	3
(South Africa) E Edwards	5	7	6
(United States) R Hightower	7	6
(Chile) J Fillol	5	1
(South Africa) R Moore	6	6
(United States) R Meyer	7	7
(United States) J Borowiak	2	4
13	(Australia) P Dent	6	6
15	(New Zealand) C Lewis	6	4	6
(Australia) J Fitzgerald	4	6	8
(France) T Tulasne	4	3
(Paraguay) F González	6	6
(United States) N Saviano	6	2	6
(United States) L Stefanki	4	6	4
(Australia) J Alexander	4	6
3	(United States) B Gottfried	6	7

Second round
(South Africa) E Edwards	6	6	6
(United States) R Hightower	7	4	2
(United States) R Meyer	2	3
13	(Australia) P Dent	6	6
(Australia) J Fitzgerald	4	6	6
(Paraguay) F González	6	1	4
(United States) N Saviano	6	1	4
3	(United States) B Gottfried	4	6	6

Third round
(South Africa) E Edwards	7	6
13	(Australia) P Dent	5	3
(Australia) J Fitzgerald	7	3	5
3	(United States) B Gottfried	6	6	7

Quarterfinals
(South Africa) E Edwards	3	3
3	(United States) B Gottfried	6	6

==== Section 4 ====
First round
5	(United States) J Sadri	6	6
(United States) M Estep	4	3
(Australia) S Ball	7	6
(United Kingdom) M Cox	6	2
(United States) M Davis	4	3
(Australia) R Frawley	6	6
(United Kingdom) R Lewis	5	1
10	(United States) V Amaya	7	6
11	(South Africa) K Curren	6	6
(United States) C Mayotte	4	3
(Australia) C Johnstone	2	6
(New Zealand) R Simpson	6	7
(India) R Krishnan	1	2
(Australia) G Whitecross	6	6
(New Zealand) O Parun	3	2
2	(United States) R Tanner	6	6

Second round
5	(United States) J Sadri	4	6	6
(Australia) S Ball	6	3	2
(Australia) R Frawley	5	4
10	(United States) V Amaya	7	6
11	(South Africa) K Curren	6	7	6
(New Zealand) R Simpson	7	6	3
(Australia) G Whitecross	3	4
2	(United States) R Tanner	6	6

Third round
5	(United States) J Sadri	3	7	3
10	(United States) V Amaya	6	6	1^{r}
11	(South Africa) K Curren	6	7	6
2	(United States) R Tanner	7	6	4

Quarterfinals
5	(United States) J Sadri	7	6
11	(South Africa) K Curren	6	1
