= 1982 Stella Artois Championships – Singles =

Singles
- 1982 Stella Artois Championships

Final
- Champion: (United States) Jimmy Connors
- Runner-up: (United States) John McEnroe
- Score: 7–5, 6–3

Details
- Draw: 64
- Seeds: 16

Events
Singles	Doubles
← 1981 ·	Queen's Club Championships	· 1983 →

Jimmy Connors won the singles title at the 1982 Queen's Club Championships tennis tournament defeating defending champion John McEnroe in the final 7–5, 6–3.

== Seeds ==
1. (United States) John McEnroe (final)
2. (United States) Jimmy Connors (champion)
3. (United States) Sandy Mayer (second round)
4. (United States) Brian Teacher (third round)
5. (Australia) Mark Edmondson (quarterfinals)
6. (United States) Steve Denton (first round)
7. (United States) Brian Gottfried (quarterfinals)
8. (United States) Chip Hooper (quarterfinals)
9. (United States) John Sadri (third round)
10. (United States) Hank Pfister (third round)
11. (United States) Tim Mayotte (second round)
12. (New Zealand) Chris Lewis (semifinals)
13. (South Africa) Kevin Curren (semifinals)
14. (Australia) Kim Warwick (first round)
15. (Australia) Rod Frawley (first round)
16. (United States) Bruce Manson (first round)

== Draw ==
=== Key ===
- Q = Qualifier
- WC = Wild card
- LL = Lucky loser
- Alt = Alternate
- SE = Special exempt
- PR = Protected ranking
- ITF = ITF entry
- JE = Junior exempt
- w/o = Walkover
- r = Retired
- d = Defaulted
- SR = Special ranking

=== Finals ===
Semifinals
1	(United States) John McEnroe	6	6
12	(New Zealand) Chris Lewis	0	2
13	(South Africa) Kevin Curren	5	4
2	(United States) Jimmy Connors	7	6

Final
1	(United States) John McEnroe	5	3
2	(United States) Jimmy Connors	7	6

=== Top half ===
==== Section 1 ====
First round
1	(United States) J McEnroe	6	6
(United States) A Andrews	4	2
(Australia) S Ball	7	1	1
(Australia) C Fancutt	5	6	6
(South Africa) D Visser	2	6	6
(United States) Tim Gullikson	6	1	3
(Brazil) J Soares	6	6
9	(United States) J Sadri	7	7
14	(Australia) K Warwick	3	4
(Australia) P McNamee	6	6
(United States) J Borowiak	4	6	8
(United States) T Delatte	6	3	6
Q	(United States) M S Strode	6	3
(United States) J Lapidus	7	6
(New Zealand) R Simpson	2	6	8
8	(United States) C Hooper	6	0	10

Second round
1	(United States) J McEnroe	6	6
(Australia) C Fancutt	3	2
(South Africa) D Visser	7	6	3
9	(United States) J Sadri	5	7	6
(Australia) P McNamee	6	6	6
(United States) J Borowiak	7	3	4
(United States) J Lapidus	4	6	1
8	(United States) C Hooper	6	4	6

Third round
1	(United States) J McEnroe	6	6
9	(United States) J Sadri	3	2
(Australia) P McNamee	4	2
8	(United States) C Hooper	6	6

Quarterfinals
1	(United States) J McEnroe	6	6
8	(United States) C Hooper	3	4

==== Section 2 ====
First round
3	(United States) S Mayer	2	7	6
(France) H Leconte	6	6	3
(United States) N Saviano	4	2
(South Africa) E Edwards	6	6
(India) R Krishnan	2	6
(United States) F Buehning	6	7
(Australia) C Johnstone	6	6
15	(Australia) R Frawley	0	3
12	(New Zealand) C Lewis	6	6
(United States) L Bourne	3	3
(United States) T Cain	3	6	10
(United Kingdom) J Smith	6	4	8
Q	(Australia) W Hampson	6	7
(United States) M Mitchell	3	5
(Australia) J Alexander	6	1	6
6	(United States) S Denton	3	6	3

Second round
3	(United States) S Mayer	4	6	8
(South Africa) E Edwards	6	3	10
(United States) F Buehning	6	7
(Australia) C Johnstone	2	6
12	(New Zealand) C Lewis	6	6
(United States) T Cain	2	2
Q	(Australia) W Hampson	7	6
(Australia) J Alexander	5	3

Third round
(South Africa) E Edwards	6	3	4
(United States) F Buehning	1	6	6
12	(New Zealand) C Lewis	6	7
Q	(Australia) W Hampson	4	6

Quarterfinals
(United States) F Buehning	2	6	1
12	(New Zealand) C Lewis	6	4	6

=== Bottom half ===
==== Section 3 ====
First round
7	(United States) B Gottfried	7	7
(United States) V Amaya	5	6
(United States) E Iskersky	1	2
(Brazil) M Hocevar	6	6
Q	(United States) G Holroyd	6	4	2
(United States) P Du Pré	1	6	6
(South Africa) D Tarr	2	4
11	(United States) T Mayotte	6	6
13	(South Africa) K Curren	7	6
(United States) M Vines	6	1
(United States) M Doyle	7	4	11
(Nigeria) N Odizor	6	6	9
(Brazil) J Góes	3	4
Q	(New Zealand) D Mustard	6	6
(United States) P Rennert	2	6	7
4	(United States) B Teacher	6	4	9

Second round
7	(United States) B Gottfried	5	6	6
(Brazil) M Hocevar	7	4	3
(United States) P Du Pré	6	6
11	(United States) T Mayotte	4	3
13	(South Africa) K Curren	6	6
(United States) M Doyle	3	4
Q	(New Zealand) D Mustard	6	5
4	(United States) B Teacher	7	7

Third round
7	(United States) B Gottfried	4	6	6
(United States) P Du Pré	6	4	3
13	(South Africa) K Curren	7	0	6
4	(United States) B Teacher	5	6	4

Quarterfinals
7	(United States) B Gottfried	1	1
13	(South Africa) K Curren	6	6

==== Section 4 ====
First round
5	(Australia) M Edmondson	3	6	6
(United States) M Davis	6	3	1
(United States) Tom Gullikson	6	6	14
Q	(Paraguay) F González	4	7	12
(United States) T Wilkison	d
Q	(Australia) P Johnston
(United Kingdom) J Lloyd	6	7
16	(United States) B Manson	3	6
10	(United States) H Pfister	7	7
(United States) D Stockton	6	6
(Australia) B Drewett	3	6	3
(United States) M Estep	6	2	6
(South Africa) F Sauer	0	3
(Australia) J Fitzgerald	6	6
(Spain) J López-Maeso	2	2
2	(United States) J Connors	6	6

Second round
5	(Australia) M Edmondson	6	6
(United States) Tom Gullikson	4	3
Q	(Australia) P Johnston	6	6	4
(United Kingdom) J Lloyd	7	2	6
10	(United States) H Pfister	6	6
(United States) M Estep	2	3
(Australia) J Fitzgerald	0	1
2	(United States) J Connors	6	6

Third round
5	(Australia) M Edmondson	6	6
(United Kingdom) J Lloyd	4	3
10	(United States) H Pfister	6	4
2	(United States) J Connors	7	6

Quarterfinals
5	(Australia) M Edmondson	1	2
2	(United States) J Connors	6	6
