= 1980 Pepsi Grand Slam =

- Date: February 8–10
- Edition: 5th
- Category: Special event
- Draw: 4S
- Prize money: $300,000
- Surface: Clay / outdoor
- Location: Boca Raton, Florida, U.S.
- Venue: Mission Hills Country Club

Champions

Singles
- (Sweden) Björn Borg
← 1979 ·	Pepsi Grand Slam	· 1981 →

The 1980 Pepsi Grand Slam was a men's tennis tournament played on outdoor green clay courts at the Mission Hills Country Club in Boca Raton, Florida, United States It was an Association of Tennis Professionals (ATP) sanctioned special event that was not part of the 1980 Volvo Grand Prix circuit. It was the fifth edition of the tournament and was held from February 8 through February 10, 1980. Björn Borg won his fourth consecutive singles title at the event and earned $150,000 first prize money.

== Final ==
=== Singles ===
(Sweden) Björn Borg defeated (United States) Vitas Gerulaitis 6–1, 5–7, 6–1

- It was Borg's 1st singles title of the year and the 53rd of his career.

== Draw ==
Semifinals
(Sweden) Björn Borg	6	6
(Argentina) Guillermo Vilas	2	3
(United States) Vitas Gerulaitis	7	6
(United States) John McEnroe'	6	3

Final
(Sweden) Björn Borg	6	5	6
(United States) Vitas Gerulaitis	1	7	1

=== Third place match ===
(United States) John McEnroe defeated (Argentina) Guillermo Vilas 8–7^{(7–5)}
