= 1981 Stella Artois Championships =

Tennis tournament

- Date: 8–14 June
- Edition: 79th
- Category: Grand Prix
- Draw: 64S / 32D
- Prize money: $125,000
- Surface: Grass / outdoor
- Location: London, United Kingdom
- Venue: Queen's Club

Champions

Singles
- (United States) John McEnroe

Doubles
- (United States) Pat Du Pré / (United States) Brian Teacher
- Queen's Club Championships

The 1981 Stella Artois Championships, also known as the Queen's Club Championships, was a men's tennis tournament played on outdoor grass courts at the Queen's Club in London in the United Kingdom that was part of the 1981 Volvo Grand Prix circuit. It was the 79th edition of the tournament and was held from 8 June until 14 June 1981. First-seeded John McEnroe won his third consecutive singles title at the event.

== Finals ==
=== Singles ===
(United States) John McEnroe defeated (United States) Brian Gottfried 7–6, 7–5

- It was McEnroe's 6th singles title of the year and the 30th of his career.

=== Doubles ===
(United States) Pat Du Pré / (United States) Brian Teacher defeated (South Africa) Kevin Curren / (United States) Steve Denton 3–6, 7–6, 11–9

- It was Du Pré's only title of the year and the 4th of his career. It was Teacher's 3rd title of the year and the 15th of his career.
