= 1983 Stella Artois Championships – Doubles =

Doubles
- 1983 Stella Artois Championships

Final
- Champions: (United States) Brian Gottfried (Australia) Paul McNamee
- Runners-up: (South Africa) Kevin Curren (United States) Steve Denton
- Score: 6–4, 6–3

Details
- Draw: 32
- Seeds: 8

Events
Singles	Doubles
- Queen's Club Championships

John McEnroe and Peter Rennert were the defending champions but they competed with different partners that year, McEnroe with Peter Fleming and Rennert with Chip Hooper.

Hooper and Rennert lost in the first round to Fleming and McEnroe.

Fleming and McEnroe lost in the semifinals to Brian Gottfried and Paul McNamee.

Brian Gottfried and Paul McNamee won the doubles title at the 1983 Queen's Club Championships tennis tournament defeating Kevin Curren and Steve Denton in the final 6–4, 6–3.

== Seeds ==
1. (United States) Peter Fleming / (United States) John McEnroe (semifinals)
2. (South Africa) Kevin Curren / (United States) Steve Denton (final)
3. (United States) Brian Gottfried / (Australia) Paul McNamee (champions)
4. (Australia) Mark Edmondson / (United States) Sherwood Stewart (first round)
5. (United States) Tim Gullikson / (United States) Tom Gullikson (second round)
6. (United States) Fritz Buehning / (United States) Brian Teacher (first round)
7. (Australia) John Alexander / (Australia) John Fitzgerald (first round)
8. (South Africa) Frew McMillan / (United States) Hank Pfister (first round)

== Draw ==
Key

- Q = Qualifier
- WC = Wild card
- LL = Lucky loser
- Alt = Alternate
- ITF = ITF entry
- PR = Protected ranking
- SR = Special ranking
- SE = Special exempt
- JE = Junior exempt
- JR = Junior Accelerator Programme entrant
- CO = College Accelerator Programme entrant
- NG = Next Gen Accelerator Program entrant
- w/o = Walkover
- r = Retired
- d = Defaulted

=== Final ===
Semifinals
1	(United States) Peter Fleming (United States) John McEnroe	5	4
3	(United States) Brian Gottfried (Australia) Paul McNamee	7	6
(Australia) Pat Cash (Australia) Craig A. Miller	4	6
2	(South Africa) Kevin Curren (United States) Steve Denton	6	7

Final
3	(United States) Brian Gottfried (Australia) Paul McNamee	6	6
2	(South Africa) Kevin Curren (United States) Steve Denton	4	3

=== Top half ===
First round
1	(United States) P Fleming (United States) J McEnroe	6	6
(United States) C Hooper (United States) P Rennert	3	3
(United States) A Andrews (United States) J Sadri	3	7	6
(United States) M Leach (United States) J Turpin	6	6	4
(United States) D Dowlen (Nigeria) N Odizor	7	7
(United Kingdom) J Lloyd (United States) B Manson	5	5
(Argentina) J L Clerc (Czechoslovakia) I Lendl	6	3	6
8	(South Africa) F McMillan (United States) H Pfister	4	6	3
3	(United States) B Gottfried (Australia) P McNamee	7	6
(United States) M Dickson (Poland) W Fibak	5	2
(United States) C B Strode (United States) M S Strode	6	6
(Brazil) G Barbosa (Brazil) J Soares	4	4
(South Africa) E Edwards (United Kingdom) J Smith	7	6
(Australia) B Dyke (Australia) R Frawley	5	4
(United States) M De Palmer (New Zealand) C Lewis	7	4	4
5	(United States) Tim Gullikson (United States) Tom Gullikson	5	6	6

Second round
1	(United States) P Fleming (United States) J McEnroe	6	6
(United States) A Andrews (United States) J Sadri	2	3
(United States) D Dowlen (Nigeria) N Odizor	6	1
(Argentina) J L Clerc (Czechoslovakia) I Lendl	7	2^{r}
3	(United States) B Gottfried (Australia) P McNamee	7	7
(United States) C B Strode (United States) M S Strode	6	6
(South Africa) E Edwards (United Kingdom) J Smith	6	6	18
5	(United States) Tim Gullikson (United States) Tom Gullikson	3	7	16

Quarterfinals
1	(United States) P Fleming (United States) J McEnroe	7	6	6
(United States) D Dowlen (Nigeria) N Odizor	6	7	4
3	(United States) B Gottfried (Australia) P McNamee	6	6
(South Africa) E Edwards (United Kingdom) J Smith	1	4

Semifinals
1	(United States) P Fleming (United States) J McEnroe	5	4
3	(United States) B Gottfried (Australia) P McNamee	7	6

=== Bottom half ===
First round
7	(Australia) J Alexander (Australia) J Fitzgerald	7	1	3
(Australia) D Graham (Australia) L Warder	6	6	6
(United Kingdom) J Bates (United Kingdom) J Dier	4	6	10
(United Kingdom) N Brown (United Kingdom) S Shaw	6	3	12
(Australia) C Johnstone (South Africa) R Venter	6	6
(South Africa) F Sauer (South Africa) M van der Merwe	1	2
(Australia) P Cash (Australia) C Miller	7	5	6
4	(Australia) M Edmondson (United States) S Stewart	6	7	3
6	(United States) F Buehning (United States) B Teacher	7	3	5
(United States) J Benson (United States) S Giammalva, Jr.	6	6	7
(United States) M Mitchell (United States) C Wittus	6	6
(United States) M Bauer (United States) D Gitlin	4	4
(South Africa) T Viljoen (South Africa) D Visser	6	7
(United Kingdom) J Feaver (United Kingdom) R Lewis	3	6
(India) A Amritraj (South Africa) B Mitton	1	4
2	(South Africa) K Curren (United States) S Denton	6	6

Second round
(Australia) D Graham (Australia) L Warder	7	6
(United Kingdom) N Brown (United Kingdom) S Shaw	6	3
(Australia) C Johnstone (South Africa) R Venter	3	2
(Australia) P Cash (Australia) C Miller	6	6
(United States) J Benson (United States) S Giammalva, Jr.	6	7
(United States) M Mitchell (United States) C Wittus	0	6
(South Africa) T Viljoen (South Africa) D Visser	6	4
2	(South Africa) K Curren (United States) S Denton	7	6

Quarterfinals
(Australia) D Graham (Australia) L Warder	3	5
(Australia) P Cash (Australia) C Miller	6	7
(United States) J Benson (United States) S Giammalva, Jr.	6	4
2	(South Africa) K Curren (United States) S Denton	7	6

Semifinals
(Australia) P Cash (Australia) C Miller	4	6
2	(South Africa) K Curren (United States) S Denton	6	7
