= 1978 Pepsi Grand Slam =

- Date: January 20–22
- Edition: 3rd
- Category: Special event
- Draw: 4S
- Prize money: $250,000
- Surface: Clay / outdoor
- Location: Boca Raton, Florida, U.S.
- Venue: Mission Hills Country Club

Champions

Singles
- (Sweden) Björn Borg
- Pepsi Grand Slam

The 1978 Pepsi Grand Slam, officially the Pepsi-Cola Grand Slam of Tennis, was a men's tennis tournament played on outdoor green clay courts at the Mission Hills Country Club in Boca Raton, Florida, United States It was an Association of Tennis Professionals (ATP) sanctioned special event that was not part of the 1978 Colgate-Palmolive Grand Prix circuit. It was the third edition of the tournament and was held from January 20 through January 22, 1978. Björn Borg won his second consecutive singles title at the event and earned $125,000 first prize money.

== Final ==
=== Singles ===
(Sweden) Björn Borg defeated (United States) Jimmy Connors 7–6^{(7–1)}, 3–6, 6–1

- It was Borg's 2nd singles title of the year and the 32nd of his career.

== Prize money ==
Event	W	F	3rd	4th
Singles	$125,000	$60,000	$40,000	$25,000

== Draw ==
Semifinals
(Sweden) Björn Borg	6	6
(United States) Brian Gottfried	2	4
(United States) Jimmy Connors	6	6
(United States) Vitas Gerulaitis	2	4

Final
(Sweden) Björn Borg	7	3	6
(United States) Jimmy Connors	6	6	1

=== Third place match ===
(United States) Brian Gottfried defeated (United States) Vitas Gerulaitis 6–3, 6–3

== See also ==
- Borg–Connors rivalry
