= 1980 U.S. National Indoor Championships =

- Date: February 25 – March 3
- Edition: 11th
- Category: Grand Prix
- Draw: 48S / 24D
- Prize money: $250,000
- Surface: Carpet / indoor
- Location: Memphis, TN, United States
- Venue: Racquet Club of Memphis

Champions

Singles
- (United States) John McEnroe

Doubles
- (United States) John McEnroe / (United States) Brian Gottfried
- U.S. National Indoor Championships

The 1980 U.S. National Indoor Championships was a men's tennis tournament played on indoor carpet courts at the Racquet Club of Memphis in Memphis, Tennessee in the United States. The event was part of the Grand Prix circuit. It was the 11th edition of the tournament in the open era and was held from February 25 through March 3, 1980. First-seeded John McEnroe won the singles title and $40,000 first-prize money. As a result of his title win McEnroe overtook Björn Borg as the ATP world No. 1 ranked player.

== Finals ==
=== Singles ===
(United States) John McEnroe defeated (United States) Jimmy Connors 7–6^{(8–6)}, 7–6^{(7–4)}

- It was McEnroe's 2nd singles title of the year and the 17th of his career.

=== Doubles ===
(United States) John McEnroe / (United States) Brian Gottfried defeated (Australia) Rod Frawley / (Czechoslovakia) Tomáš Šmíd 6–3, 6–7, 7–6

== See also ==
- Connors–McEnroe rivalry
- 1980 U.S. Indoor – Michelob Light Classic – women's tournament
