= 1981 Stella Artois Championships – Doubles =

Doubles
- 1981 Stella Artois Championships

Final
- Champions: (United States) Pat DuPré (United States) Brian Teacher
- Runners-up: (South Africa) Kevin Curren (United States) Steve Denton
- Score: 3–6, 7–6, 11–9

Details
- Draw: 32
- Seeds: 8

Events
Singles	Doubles
- Queen's Club Championships

Rod Frawley and Geoff Masters were the defending champions but only Frawley competed that year with Chris Lewis.

Frawley and Lewis lost in the second round to Peter Fleming and John McEnroe.

Pat DuPré and Brian Teacher won the doubles title at the 1981 Queen's Club Championships tennis tournament defeating Kevin Curren and Steve Denton in the final 3–6, 7–6, 11–9.

== Seeds ==
1. (United States) Peter Fleming / (United States) John McEnroe (quarterfinals)
2. (Australia) Mark Edmondson / (Australia) Paul McNamee (second round)
3. (United States) Victor Amaya / (United States) Hank Pfister (quarterfinals)
4. (South Africa) Kevin Curren / (United States) Steve Denton (final)
5. (United States) Tim Gullikson / (South Africa) Bernard Mitton (quarterfinals)
6. (South Africa) Frew McMillan / (United States) Peter Rennert (semifinals)
7. (United States) Pat DuPré / (United States) Brian Teacher (champions)
8. (South Africa) Eddie Edwards / (United States) Craig Edwards (first round)

== Draw ==
Key

- Q = Qualifier
- WC = Wild card
- LL = Lucky loser
- Alt = Alternate
- ITF = ITF entry
- PR = Protected ranking
- SR = Special ranking
- SE = Special exempt
- JE = Junior exempt
- JR = Junior Accelerator Programme entrant
- CO = College Accelerator Programme entrant
- NG = Next Gen Accelerator Program entrant
- w/o = Walkover
- r = Retired
- d = Defaulted

=== Final ===
Semifinals
(United States) John Austin (United States) John McEnroe	6	7	4
4	(South Africa) Kevin Curren (United States) Steve Denton	7	5	6
7	(United States) Pat DuPré (United States) Brian Teacher	6	3	6
6	(South Africa) Frew McMillan (United States) Peter Rennert	3	6	3

Final
4	(South Africa) Kevin Curren (United States) Steve Denton	6	6	9
7	(United States) Pat DuPré (United States) Brian Teacher	3	7	11

=== Top half ===
First round
1	(United States) P Fleming (United States) J McEnroe	7	6
(Paraguay) F González (France) G Moretton	6	3
(Australia) R Frawley (New Zealand) C Lewis	7	6
(United States) D Ralston (United States) R Tanner	6	3
(Australia) D Carter (Australia) P Kronk	4	7	6
(Australia) S Ball (Australia) C Letcher	6	6	3
(United States) J Austin (United States) F Buehning	6	6
8	(South Africa) E Edwards (United States) C Edwards	4	4
4	(South Africa) K Curren (United States) S Denton	6	6
(Chile) J Fillol (United States) G Hardie	3	2
(United States) B Martin (New Zealand) R Simpson	6	7
(South Africa) R Moore (United States) E van Dillen	3	6
(United States) M Davis (United States) C Dunk	6	7	6
(United States) J Sadri (United States) T Wilkison	7	5	3
(United States) R Hightower (United States) C Wittus	6	6	4
5	(United States) T Gullikson (South Africa) B Mitton	4	7	6

Second round
1	(United States) P Fleming (United States) J McEnroe	6	6
(Australia) R Frawley (New Zealand) C Lewis	3	4
(Australia) D Carter (Australia) P Kronk	2	0
(United States) J Austin (United States) F Buehning	6	6
4	(South Africa) K Curren (United States) S Denton	6	6	6
(United States) B Martin (New Zealand) R Simpson	4	7	3
(United States) M Davis (United States) C Dunk	4	6
5	(United States) T Gullikson (South Africa) B Mitton	6	7

Quarterfinals
1	(United States) P Fleming (United States) J McEnroe	4	7	3
(United States) J Austin (United States) F Buehning	6	6	6
4	(South Africa) K Curren (United States) S Denton	7	6
5	(United States) T Gullikson (South Africa) B Mitton	6	3

Semifinals
(United States) J Austin (United States) J McEnroe	6	7	4
4	(South Africa) K Curren (United States) S Denton	7	5	6

=== Bottom half ===
First round
7	(United States) P DuPré (United States) B Teacher	6	6	14
(India) A Amritraj (India) V Amritraj	4	7	12
(France) C Roger-Vasselin (France) T Tulasne	6	6
(United Kingdom) J Lloyd (United Kingdom) D Lloyd	4	4
(United Kingdom) A Jarrett (United Kingdom) J Smith	5	7	6
(United Kingdom) J Feaver (United Kingdom) R Lewis	7	6	4
(India) S Menon (United States) B Scanlon	2	6
3	(United States) V Amaya (United States) H Pfister	6	7
6	(South Africa) F McMillan (United States) P Rennert	6	6
(United States) F McNair (United States) D Stockton	3	3
(United States) M Estep (United States) N Saviano	6	7
(United States) C Mayotte (United States) R Meyer	4	5
(Australia) R Case (Australia) B Drewett	7	6
(Australia) J Alexander (Australia) P Dent	6	4
(United States) T Delatte (United States) J Delouie	7	6	1
2	(Australia) M Edmondson (Australia) P McNamee	6	7	6

Second round
7	(United States) P DuPré (United States) B Teacher	w/o
(France) C Roger-Vasselin (France) T Tulasne
(United Kingdom) A Jarrett (United Kingdom) J Smith	1	4
3	(United States) V Amaya (United States) H Pfister	6	6
6	(South Africa) F McMillan (United States) P Rennert	7	7
(United States) M Estep (United States) N Saviano	6	6
(Australia) R Case (Australia) B Drewett	6	6
2	(Australia) M Edmondson (Australia) P McNamee	4	3

Quarterfinals
7	(United States) P DuPré (United States) B Teacher	7	6
3	(United States) V Amaya (United States) H Pfister	5	2
6	(South Africa) F McMillan (United States) P Rennert	6	7
(Australia) R Case (Australia) B Drewett	1	6

Semifinals
7	(United States) P DuPré (United States) B Teacher	6	3	6
6	(South Africa) F McMillan (United States) P Rennert	3	6	3
