= Leif Shiras =

American tennis player and journalist

- Full name: George Livingston Shiras
- Country (sports): United States
- Residence: Laguna Hills, California
- Born: 21 August 1959 (age 66) Norwalk, Connecticut
- Height: 6 ft 0 in (1.83 m)
- Turned pro: 1981
- Retired: 1991
- Plays: Right-handed
- College: Princeton
- Prize money: $467,156

Singles
- Career record: 71–102
- Career titles: 0
- Highest ranking: No. 31 (30 July 1984)

Grand Slam singles results
- Australian Open: 3R (1985)
- French Open: 2R (1990)
- Wimbledon: 4R (1989)
- US Open: 2R (1989)

Doubles
- Career record: 49–90
- Career titles: 0
- Highest ranking: No. 57 (17 October 1988)

George Livingston "Leif" Shiras (born August 21, 1959) is an American former professional tennis player and current tennis commentator.

== Personal life ==
George Livingston Shiras was born in August 21, 1959 in Norwalk, Connecticut and raised in Rowayton, Connecticut until his family moved to Shorewood, Wisconsin in 1963 for his father's job in public relations. He attended Shorewood High School, where he played tennis, basketball, and volleyball. But he was most drawn to tennis after growing up watching his parents play the sport recreationally and he became the State High School champion in his junior and senior years, leading him to earn the No. 1-ranked under-18 player in Wisconsin.

Shiras attended his father's alma-mater of Princeton University to pursue a bachelor's degree in English, where he graduated in 1981. There, he was also a collegiate tennis NCAA All-American in 1979 and 1980, and had also reached the NCAA semifinals.

In 1993, Shiras moved from Toronto and now resides in Laguna Hills, California with his wife, Maria, and his two sons, Emmett and Austin.

== Tennis career ==
During his career as a player, Shiras reached one top-level final – at the Queen's Club Championships in 1984, where he lost to John McEnroe 1–6, 6–3, 2–6 (having beaten Ivan Lendl in the first round). His best singles performance at a Grand Slam event came at Wimbledon in 1989, where he reached the fourth round. His career-high ranking was World No. 31 in singles (in 1984) and World No. 57 in doubles in (in 1988).

Shiras retired from the professional tour in 1990. In 1995, he won the Wimbledon over-35 men's doubles title with partner Paul McNamee.

== Broadcasting career ==
Shiras has worked as a tennis commentator on Tennis Channel since its inception in 2003 and Sky Sports. He was also the lead tennis analyst for the Association of Tennis Professionals's ATP Tour on Fox Sports.

== Career finals ==
=== Singles (1 loss) ===
| Result | W/L | Date | Tournament | Surface | Opponent | Score |
|---|---|---|---|---|---|---|
| Loss | 0–1 | Jun 1984 | Queen's Club, London, UK | Grass | (United States) John McEnroe | 1–6, 6–3, 2–6 |
