= 1983 Lite Challenge of Champions =

Singles
- 1983 Lite Challenge of Champions

Final
- Champion: (Czechoslovakia) Ivan Lendl
- Runner-up: (United States) Jimmy Connors
- Score: 4–6, 6–4, 7–5, 6–4

Details
- Draw: 8
- Challenge of Champions

The Chicago Challenge of Champions tennis exhibition tournament was held on January 4–9, 1983 at the Rosemont Horizon in Rosemont, Illinois. The promoter was Andrzej Kepinski, and this was the first year of sponsorship by Miller Lite. This was the third year of the Challenge.

Ivan Lendl won in the final 4–6, 6–4, 7–5, 6–4 against Jimmy Connors.

== Dates, schedule and attendance ==
Match play began at 6:30 p.m. each evening from Tuesday, January 4, 1982, through Friday, January 7, 1982. The semi-finals were held at 7:30 p.m. on Saturday, January 8, 1982, and the finals were held at 2:30 p.m. on Sunday, January 9, 1982.

Round robin Match Dates and Matches
Date	Match 1	Match 2	Match 3
January 4	Jimmy Connors vs. Henri Leconte	Bjorn Borg vs. Vitas Gerulaitis	Ivan Lendl vs Sandy Mayer
January 5	Vitas Gerulaitis vs. Henri Leconte	John Mc Enroe vs Sandy Mayer	Ivan Lendl vs. Eliot Teltscher
January 6	Vitas Gerulaitis vs. Jimmy Connors	Bjorn Borg vs. Henri Leconte	John Mc Enroe vs. Eliot Teltscher
January 7	Sandy Mayer vs Eliot Teltscher	Ivan Lendl vs. John Mc Enroe	Bjorn Borg vs. Jimmy Connors

The attendance for Friday's matches was approximately 15,000. Attendance at Saturday's semi-finals was 15,820, and according to the promoter this was a sell-out of the stadium when configured for tennis. Attendance at Sunday's finals was 11,416

== Purse ==
The total purse was $250,000. The winner received $100,00, the runner-up $50,000, third and fourth-place finishers received $30,000 each, fifth and sixth-place finishers received $12,500, and the seventh and eighth-place finishers received $7,500. Individual players also received undisclosed amounts for appearing at the event from the sponsors/promoters.

== Players ==
1. (Czechoslovakia) Ivan Lendl (champion)
2. (United States) Jimmy Connors (final)
3. (United States) John McEnroe (semifinals)
4. (Sweden) Björn Borg (semifinals)
5. (United States) Vitas Gerulaitis (round-robin)
6. (United States) Eliot Teltscher (round-robin)
7. (France) Henri Leconte (round-robin)
8. (United States) Sandy Mayer (round-robin)

== Draw ==
=== Finals ===
Semi-finals
(United States) John McEnroe	1	7	2
(United States) Jimmy Connors	6	5	6
(Czechoslovakia) Ivan Lendl	6	7
(Sweden) Björn Borg	1	5

Final
(United States) Jimmy Connors	6	4	5	4
(Czechoslovakia) Ivan Lendl	4	6	7	6

=== Group A ===
	(United States) John McEnroe	(Czechoslovakia) Ivan Lendl	(United States) Eliot Teltscher	(United States) Sandy Mayer	RR W–L	Set W–L	Game W–L	Standings
(United States) John McEnroe		6–3, 6–2	7–6, 6–4	6–3, 6–4	3-0	6-0	37-22	1
(Czechoslovakia) Ivan Lendl	3–6, 2–6		7–6, 2–6, 6–2	6–2, 7–5	2-1	4-3	33-33	2
(United States) Eliot Teltscher	4–6, 1–6	6–7, 6–2, 2–6		6–3, 7–6	1-2	3-4	37-37	3
(United States) Sandy Mayer	3–6, 4–6	2–6, 5–7	3–6, 6–7		0-3	0-6	23-48	4

=== Group B ===
	(Sweden) Björn Borg	(United States) Jimmy Connors	(United States) Vitas Gerulaitis	(France) Henri Leconte	RR W–L	Set W–L	Game W–L	Standings
(Sweden) Björn Borg		6–4, 1–6, 6–2	4–6, 6–2, 6–4	6–2, 6–7, 6–1	3-0	6-3	47-34	1
(United States) Jimmy Connors	4–6, 6–1, 2–6		6–1, 6–4	6–4, 2–6, 6–1	2-1	5-3	38-29	2
(United States) Vitas Gerulaitis	6–4, 2–6, 4–6	1–6, 4–6		7–6, 6–2	1-2	3-4	30-36	3
(France) Henri Leconte	2–6, 7–6, 1–6	4–6, 6–2, 1–6	6–7, 2-6		0-3	2-6	29-45	4
