= Pepsi Grand Slam =

Defunct tennis tournament
- Tour: Grand Prix circuit
- Founded: 1976
- Abolished: 1981
- Editions: 6
- Location: Myrtle Beach, SC, US (1976); Boca Raton, FL, US (1977–81)
- Surface: Clay / outdoor

The Pepsi Grand Slam of Tennis was a men's tennis tournament played as part of the Grand Prix circuit from 1976 to 1981. The tournament was played in Myrtle Beach, South Carolina, in 1976 and Boca Raton, Florida, from 1977 to 1981. It was held on outdoor clay courts and featured a field of four players: winners of the semi-finals played in the final, while losers played a consolation match.

The tournament's official name was the "Pepsi-Cola Grand Slam of Tennis". It was sponsored by Pepsi-Cola, who also sponsored a "mobile tennis program" (youth instruction) and a worldwide junior tournament circuit. CBS Sports broadcast the matches as part of its tennis coverage.

== Results ==
=== Singles champions ===
Location	Year	Champion	Runner-up	Score
Myrtle Beach	1976	(Romania) Ilie Năstase	(Spain) Manuel Orantes	6–4, 6–3
Boca Raton	1977	(Sweden) Björn Borg	(United States) Jimmy Connors	6–4, 5–7, 6–3
Boca Raton	1978	(Sweden) Björn Borg	(United States) Jimmy Connors	7–6^{(7–1)}, 3–6, 6–1
Boca Raton	1979	(Sweden) Björn Borg	(United States) Jimmy Connors	6–2, 6–3
Boca Raton	1980	(Sweden) Björn Borg	(United States) Vitas Gerulaitis	6–1, 5–7, 6–1
Boca Raton	1981	(United States) John McEnroe	(Argentina) Guillermo Vilas	6–7^{(5–7)}, 6–4, 6–0

== See also ==
- Grand Slam Cup
