= Suntory Cup =

Former men's tennis tournament

Defunct tennis tournament
- Tour: Invitational
- Founded: 1978
- Abolished: 1986
- Editions: 8
- Location: Tokyo, Japan
- Venue: Yoyogi National Stadium
- Surface: Carpet / indoor
- Draw: 4S

The Suntory Cup is a defunct invitational men's tennis tournament that was held at the Yoyogi National Stadium in Tokyo, Japan from 1978 to 1986. The indoor tournament was played in April each year and consisted of a four-man draw. The event was not recognized as an official tournament by the Association of Tennis Professionals (ATP) or the International Tennis Federation (ITF) but still attracted the world's leading players due to the financial rewards. Jimmy Connors won the event a record four times. The 1983 edition was noteworthy as it was Björn Borg's last tournament before his retirement. (Note: Borg made a largely unsuccessful comeback on the men's professional tennis tour in the early-1990s)

== Results ==
=== Singles ===
Year	Prize Money	Champions	Runners-up	Score
1978		(Sweden) Björn Borg	(United States) Jimmy Connors	6–1, 6–2
1979	Tournament not held			
1980	$250,000	(United States) Jimmy Connors	(United States) John McEnroe	7–5, 6–3
1981	$250,000	(United States) Jimmy Connors	(United States) John McEnroe	6–4, 7–6
1982	$250,000	(Sweden) Björn Borg	(Argentina) Guillermo Vilas	6–1, 6–2
1983	$300,000	(United States) Jimmy Connors	(Sweden) Björn Borg	6–3, 6–4
1984	$250,000	(Czechoslovakia) Ivan Lendl	(United States) John McEnroe	6–4, 3–6, 6–2
1985	$250,000	(Czechoslovakia) Ivan Lendl	(United States) John McEnroe	6–4, 6–2
1986	$250,000	(United States) Jimmy Connors	(Sweden) Mats Wilander	6–4, 6–0

== Draws ==
=== 1978 ===
Semifinal
(Sweden) Björn Borg	6	6
(Spain) Manuel Orantes	1	4
(United States) Jimmy Connors	6	6
(Argentina) Guillermo Vilas	4	1

Final
(Sweden) Björn Borg	6	6
(United States) Jimmy Connors	1	2
Third place match
(Argentina) Guillermo Vilas	6	6	4
(Spain) Manuel Orantes	3	7	6

=== 1980 ===
Semifinal
(United States) John McEnroe
(Romania) Ilie Năstase
(United States) Jimmy Connors
(United States) Roscoe Tanner

Final
(United States) John McEnroe	5	3
(United States) Jimmy Connors	7	6
Third place match
(Romania) Ilie Năstase	7	6	2
(United States) Roscoe Tanner	6	7	6

=== 1981 ===
Semifinal
(United States) John McEnroe	6	7
(Czechoslovakia) Ivan Lendl	1	5
(United States) Jimmy Connors	6	0	6
(United States) Gene Mayer	3	6	4

Final
(United States) John McEnroe	4	6
(United States) Jimmy Connors	6	7
Third place match
(Czechoslovakia) Ivan Lendl	6	6
(United States) Gene Mayer	1	3

=== 1982 ===
Semifinal
(Argentina) Guillermo Vilas	6	6
(United States) John McEnroe	4	4
(Sweden) Björn Borg	6	6	6
(United States) Vincent Van Patten	7	4	3

Final
(Argentina) Guillermo Vilas	1	2
(Sweden) Björn Borg	6	6
Third place match
(United States) John McEnroe	7	4	3
(United States) Vincent Van Patten	6	6	6

=== 1983 ===
Semifinal
(Sweden) Björn Borg	6	2	6
(United States) John McEnroe	4	6	2
(United States) Jimmy Connors	1	6	7
(United States) Johan Kriek	6	3	5

Final
(Sweden) Björn Borg	3	4
(United States) Jimmy Connors	6	6
Third place match
(United States) John McEnroe	6	7	6
(United States) Johan Kriek	7	5	3

=== 1984 ===
Semifinal
(United States) John McEnroe	4	6	6
(United States) Jimmy Connors	6	3	4
(Czechoslovakia) Ivan Lendl	6	4	6
(France) Yannick Noah	2	6	2

Final
(United States) John McEnroe	4	6	2
(Czechoslovakia) Ivan Lendl	6	3	6
Third place match
(United States) Jimmy Connors	r.
(France) Yannick Noah

=== 1985 ===
Semifinal
(United States) John McEnroe	6	6
(France) Yannick Noah	4	4
(Czechoslovakia) Ivan Lendl	6	6
(Ecuador) Andrés Gómez	3	4

Final
(United States) John McEnroe	4	2
(Czechoslovakia) Ivan Lendl	6	6
Third place match
(France) Yannick Noah	2	6	7
(Ecuador) Andrés Gómez	6	1	6

=== 1986 ===
Semifinal
(United States) Jimmy Connors	7	5	6
(Sweden) Stefan Edberg	5	7	3
(Sweden) Mats Wilander	6	6
(Czechoslovakia) Ivan Lendl	4	4

Final
(United States) Jimmy Connors	6	6
(Sweden) Mats Wilander	4	0
Third place match
(Sweden) Stefan Edberg	1	6	5
(Czechoslovakia) Ivan Lendl	6	1	7

== See also ==
- Tokyo Indoor
