= 1986 Atlanta AT&T Challenge of Champions =

Tennis tournament

- 1986 Atlanta AT&T Challenge of Champions

Final
- Champion: (West Germany) Boris Becker
- Runner-up: (United States) John McEnroe
- Score: 3–6, 6–3, 7–5
- Challenge of Champions

The 1986 Atlanta AT&T Challenge of Champions was a tennis tournament held in 1986. Boris Becker won in the final 3–6, 6–3, 7–5 against John McEnroe.

== Players ==
1. (West Germany) Boris Becker (champion)
2. (United States) John McEnroe (final)
3. (Czechoslovakia) Ivan Lendl (semifinals)
4. (France) Yannick Noah (semifinals)
5. (Czechoslovakia) Miloslav Mečíř (round-robin)
6. (United States) Brad Gilbert (round-robin)
7. (Sweden) Mikael Pernfors (round-robin)
8. (Sweden) Mats Wilander (round-robin)

== Draw ==
=== Finals ===
Semi-finals
(Czechoslovakia) Ivan Lendl	4	5
(United States) John McEnroe	6	7
(France) Yannick Noah	4	3
(West Germany) Boris Becker	6	6

Final
(United States) John McEnroe	6	3	5
(West Germany) Boris Becker	3	6	7

=== Group A ===
	(Czechoslovakia) Ivan Lendl	(France) Yannick Noah	(Czechoslovakia) Miloslav Mečíř	(Sweden) Mikael Pernfors	RR W–L	Set W–L	Game W–L	Standings
(Czechoslovakia) Ivan Lendl		7–6(5), 6–7(7), 6–3	6–4, 6–4	6–1, 6–1	3-0	6-1	43-25	1
(France) Yannick Noah	6–7(5), 7–6(7), 3–6		6–4, 6–2	6–3, 5–7, 6–4	2-1	5-3	45-39	2
(Czechoslovakia) Miloslav Mečíř	4–6, 4–6	4–6, 2–6		0–6, 6–4, 7–5	1-2	2-5	26-39	3
(Sweden) Mikael Pernfors	1–6, 1–6	3–6, 7–5, 4–6	6–0, 4–6, 5–7		0-3	2-6	31-42	4

=== Group B ===
	(West Germany) Boris Becker	(United States) John McEnroe	(United States) Brad Gilbert	(Sweden) Mats Wilander	RR W–L	Set W–L	Game W–L	Standings
(West Germany) Boris Becker		6–3, 5–7, 7–5	6–7(2), 6–4, 3–6	7–6(4), 6–3	2-1	5-3	46-41	1
(United States) John McEnroe	3–6, 7–5, 5–7		6–1, 6–2	6–4, 6–3	2-1	5-2	39-28	2
(United States) Brad Gilbert	7–6(2), 4–6, 6–3	1–6, 2–6		6–7(4), 6–3, 4–6	1-2	3-5	36-43	3
(Sweden) Mats Wilander	6–7(4), 3–6	4–6, 3–6	7–6(4) 3–6 6–4		1-2	2-5	32-41	4
