= Challenge of Champions =

Defunct tennis tournament
- Event name: Challenge of Champions
- Tour: Invitational/Exhibition
- Founded: 1984
- Abolished: still on today
- Location: New Jersey Expo Center New Jersey, U.S.
- Surface: Mats (indoor)

The Challenge of Champions was an exhibition tennis tournament. Featuring a roster of 8 invited players, it was not recognized by the sport's main sanctioning bodies, but was one of the most lucrative and better regarded non-tour events. Beginning in 1980, it was organized by Canadian company Concert Productions International, which the following year launched a sister event called the Molson Challenge in Toronto. The tournament was discontinued after the 1989 edition.

== Past finals ==
Year	Dates	Location	Surface	Prize money	Winner	Runner-up	Score
1989	April 26–30	Atlanta	Clay (green)	$1,200,000	(United States) Andre Agassi	(United States) Michael Chang	6–3, 6–2
1988	April 28–May 1	Atlanta	Clay (green)	$1,200,000	(Czechoslovakia) Ivan Lendl	(Sweden) Stefan Edberg	2–6, 6–1, 6–3
1987	October 6–11	Atlanta	Carpet (indoor)	$1,200,000	(United States) John McEnroe	(United States) Paul Annacone	6–4, 7–5
1986	*November 25–30, 1986	Atlanta	Carpet (indoor)	$1,200,000	(Germany) Boris Becker	(United States) John McEnroe	3–6, 6–3, 7–5
1985	January 6–12, 1986	Atlanta	Carpet (indoor)	$1,000,000	(Czechoslovakia) Ivan Lendl	(United States) Jimmy Connors	6–2, 6–3
1984	January 6–11, 1985	Las Vegas		$200,000	(United States) John McEnroe	(Argentina) Guillermo Vilas	7–5, 6–0
1983	January 3–8, 1984	Chicago	Carpet (indoor)	$250,000	(United States) Jimmy Connors	(Ecuador) Andrés Gómez	6–3, 6–2, 6–1
1982	January 4–9, 1983	Chicago	Carpet (indoor)	$250,000	(Czechoslovakia) Ivan Lendl	(United States) Jimmy Connors	4–6, 6–4, 7–5, 6–4
1981	January 6–11, 1982	Chicago	Carpet (indoor)	$310,000	(United States) Jimmy Connors	(United States) John McEnroe	6–7, 7–5, 6–7, 7–5, 6–4
1980	January 7–12, 1981	Chicago	Carpet (indoor)	$310,000	(United States) John McEnroe	(United States) Jimmy Connors	6–2, 6–4, 6–1

- Held twice during the 1986 calendar year like the Nabisco Masters
