= 1983 Stella Artois Championships – Singles =

Singles
- 1983 Stella Artois Championships

Final
- Champion: (United States) Jimmy Connors
- Runner-up: (United States) John McEnroe
- Score: 6–3, 6–3

Details
- Draw: 64
- Seeds: 16

Events
| Singles | Doubles |
- Queen's Club Championships

Jimmy Connors was the defending champion and won the singles title at the 1983 Queen's Club Championships tennis tournament defeating compatriot John McEnroe in the final 6–3, 6–3.

== Seeds ==
1. (United States) Jimmy Connors (champion)
2. (United States) John McEnroe (final)
3. (Czechoslovakia) Ivan Lendl (semifinals)
4. (United States) Vitas Gerulaitis (second round)
5. (United States) Steve Denton (quarterfinals)
6. (South Africa) Kevin Curren (semifinals)
7. (United States) Bill Scanlon (third round)
8. (United States) Brian Gottfried (quarterfinals)
9. (United States) Hank Pfister (third round)
10. (Poland) Wojciech Fibak (third round)
11. (United States) Brian Teacher (first round)
12. (Australia) Mark Edmondson (first round)
13. (United States) Tim Mayotte (quarterfinals)
14. (Australia) John Alexander (first round)
15. (Australia) Paul McNamee (third round)
16. (Brazil) Marcos Hocevar (third round)

== Draw ==
Key

- Q = Qualifier
- WC = Wild card
- LL = Lucky loser
- Alt = Alternate
- ITF = ITF entry
- PR = Protected ranking
- SR = Special ranking
- SE = Special exempt
- JE = Junior exempt
- JR = Junior Accelerator Programme entrant
- CO = College Accelerator Programme entrant
- NG = Next Gen Accelerator Program entrant
- w/o = Walkover
- r = Retired
- d = Defaulted

=== Finals ===
Semifinals
1 | (United States) Jimmy Connors | 6 | 6
3 | (Czechoslovakia) Ivan Lendl | 0 | 3
6 | (South Africa) Kevin Curren | 5 | 6
2 | (United States) John McEnroe | 7 | 7

Final
1 | (United States) Jimmy Connors | 6 | 6
2 | (United States) John McEnroe | 3 | 3

=== Top half ===
==== Section 1 ====
First round
1 | (United States) J Connors | 6 | 6
(United States) L Bourne | 3 | 3
(United Kingdom) J Lloyd | 4 | 6 | 4
(Nigeria) N Odizor | 6 | 0 | 6
(United States) C Hooper | 6 | 5 | 4
(Australia) R Frawley | 1 | 7 | 6
(Brazil) G Barbosa | 6 | 2
9 | (United States) H Pfister | 7 | 6
11 | (United States) B Teacher | 2 | 4
(United States) B Testerman | 6 | 6
(India) V Amritraj | 4 | 6
Q | (United States) T Nelson | 6 | 7
(New Zealand) C Lewis | 6 | 7 | 6
Q | (South Africa) B Mitton | 7 | 5 | 0
(United States) M S Strode | 4 | 6
5 | (United States) S Denton | 6 | 7

Second round
1 | (United States) J Connors | 7 | 6
(Nigeria) N Odizor | 5 | 1
(Australia) R Frawley | 6 | 4 | 2
9 | (United States) H Pfister | 4 | 6 | 6
(United States) B Testerman | 4 | 6
Q | (United States) T Nelson | 6 | 7
(New Zealand) C Lewis | 4 | 6
5 | (United States) S Denton | 6 | 7

Third round
1 | (United States) J Connors | 6 | 6
9 | (United States) H Pfister | 4 | 2
Q | (United States) T Nelson | 5 | 6 | 15
5 | (United States) S Denton | 7 | 3 | 17

Quarterfinals
1 | (United States) J Connors | 6 | 6
5 | (United States) S Denton | 2 | 4

==== Section 2 ====
First round
3 | (Czechoslovakia) I Lendl | 6 | 6
(United States) N Saviano | 4 | 4
(United States) T Wilkison | 6 | 7 | 6
Q | (United States) M Leach | 7 | 5 | 4
(United States) Tim Gullikson | 6 | 6
(New Zealand) R Simpson | 4 | 2
(United States) R Tanner | 3 | 3
15 | (Australia) P McNamee | 6 | 6
13 | (United States) T Mayotte | 7 | 6
(United States) M Bauer | 6 | 3
(United States) M Doyle | 7 | 6
(United States) P DuPré | 5 | 3
(Australia) J Fitzgerald | 7 | 1 | 6
Q | (South Africa) T Viljoen | 6 | 6 | 3
(Australia) W Masur | 2 | 3
7 | (United States) B Scanlon | 6 | 6

Second round
3 | (Czechoslovakia) I Lendl | 4 | 7 | 6
(United States) T Wilkison | 6 | 5 | 3
(United States) Tim Gullikson | 3 | 6
15 | (Australia) P McNamee | 6 | 7
13 | (United States) T Mayotte | 6 | 6 | 6
(United States) M Doyle | 4 | 7 | 2
(Australia) J Fitzgerald | 2 | 3
7 | (United States) B Scanlon | 6 | 6

Third round
3 | (Czechoslovakia) I Lendl | 6 | 6
15 | (Australia) P McNamee | 2 | 2
13 | (United States) T Mayotte | 3 | 7 | 6
7 | (United States) B Scanlon | 6 | 6 | 4

Quarterfinals
3 | (Czechoslovakia) I Lendl | 7 | 7
13 | (United States) T Mayotte | 6 | 6

=== Bottom half ===
==== Section 3 ====
First round
6 | (South Africa) K Curren | 6 | 6
(Brazil) J Soares | 2 | 1
(United States) Tom Gullikson | 4 | 4
(United States) F Buehning | 6 | 6
(United States) D Gitlin | 6 | 6 | 2
(United States) P Rennert | 7 | 1 | 6
Q | (Australia) B Dyke | 7 | 4 | 1
10 | (Poland) W Fibak | 6 | 6 | 6
12 | (Australia) M Edmondson | 3 | 6
(United States) T Cain | 6 | 7
(United States) C Wittus | 6 | 6
(Australia) C Johnstone | 3 | 1
(United States) M Mitchell | 3 | 2
(Australia) P Cash | 6 | 6
(India) R Krishnan | 5 | 7 | 5
4 | (United States) V Gerulaitis | 7 | 6 | 7

Second round
6 | (South Africa) K Curren | 6 | 6
(United States) F Buehning | 3 | 3
(United States) P Rennert | 2 | 4
10 | (Poland) W Fibak | 6 | 6
(United States) T Cain | 3 | 6
(United States) C Wittus | 6 | 7
(Australia) P Cash | 5 | 6 | 6
4 | (United States) V Gerulaitis | 7 | 2 | 3

Third round
6 | (South Africa) K Curren | 6 | 6
10 | (Poland) W Fibak | 3 | 3
(United States) C Wittus | 2 | 3
(Australia) P Cash | 6 | 6

Quarterfinals
6 | (South Africa) K Curren | 6 | 3 | 6
(Australia) P Cash | 4 | 6 | 3

==== Section 4 ====
First round
8 | (United States) B Gottfried | 6 | 6 | 7
Q | (United States) B Walts | 2 | 7 | 6
(United States) J Sadri | 4 | 6
(Chile) R Acuña | 6 | 7
(United States) M De Palmer | 6 | 6
Q | (United States) P Lehnhoff | 2 | 1
(United States) R Harmon | 5 | 3
16 | (Brazil) M Hocevar | 7 | 6
14 | (Australia) J Alexander | 6 | 6 | 5
(United States) S Giammalva, Jr. | 4 | 7 | 7
(Brazil) C Motta | 3 | 6 | 6
Q | (United States) E Korita | 6 | 3 | 4
(South Africa) F Sauer | 2 | 6 | 6
(Australia) C Miller | 6 | 2 | 3
(United States) J Borowiak | 3 | 3
2 | (United States) J McEnroe | 6 | 6

Second round
8 | (United States) B Gottfried | 4 | 6 | 6
(Chile) R Acuña | 6 | 3 | 3
(United States) M De Palmer | 3 | 6 | 3
16 | (Brazil) M Hocevar | 6 | 2 | 6
(United States) S Giammalva, Jr. | 6 | 6 | 5
(Brazil) C Motta | 7 | 3 | 7
(South Africa) F Sauer | 1 | 6
2 | (United States) J McEnroe | 6 | 7

Third round
8 | (United States) B Gottfried | 6 | 6
16 | (Brazil) M Hocevar | 4 | 1
(Brazil) C Motta | 5 | 2
2 | (United States) J McEnroe | 7 | 6

Quarterfinals
8 | (United States) B Gottfried | 0 | 1
2 | (United States) J McEnroe | 6 | 6

== See also ==
- Connors–McEnroe rivalry
