= 1984 WCT Tournament of Champions – Singles =

Singles
- 1984 WCT Tournament of Champions

Final
- Champion: (United States) John McEnroe
- Runner-up: (Czechoslovakia) Ivan Lendl
- Score: 6–4, 6–2

Details
- Draw: 52 (1Q)
- Seeds: 13

Events
Singles	Doubles
← 1983 ·	WCT Tournament of Champions	· 1985 →

Defending champion John McEnroe defeated Ivan Lendl in the final, 6–4, 6–2 to win the singles tennis title at the 1984 WCT Tournament of Champions.

In the semifinals, Lendl defeated Jimmy Connors with a score of 6–0, 6–0, marking the first time that a former men's world No. 1 player received a double bagel in an official match.

== Seeds ==
Some seeds received a bye into the second round.

1. (United States) Jimmy Connors (semifinals)
2. (United States) John McEnroe (champion)
3. (Czechoslovakia) Ivan Lendl (final)
4. (United States) Jimmy Arias (semifinals)
5. (United States) Johan Kriek (quarterfinals)
6. (United States) Vitas Gerulaitis (third round)
7. (Australia) Brad Drewett (quarterfinals)
8. (United States) Sandy Mayer (second round)
9. (United States) Mike Bauer (second round)
10. (Chile) Pedro Rebolledo (first round)
11. (Australia) John Fitzgerald (second round)
12. (United States) Brian Gottfried (second round)
13. (United States) Aaron Krickstein (quarterfinals)

== Draw ==
=== Key ===
- Q = Qualifier
- WC = Wild card
- LL = Lucky loser
- Alt = Alternate
- ITF = ITF entry
- PR = Protected ranking
- SR = Special ranking
- SE = Special exempt
- JE = Junior exempt
- JR = Junior Accelerator Programme entrant
- CO = College Accelerator Programme entrant
- NG = Next Gen Accelerator Program entrant
- w/o = Walkover
- r = Retired
- d = Defaulted

=== Finals ===
Quarterfinals
1	(United States) Jimmy Connors	3	6	6
13	(United States) Aaron Krickstein	6	2	1
3	(Czechoslovakia) Ivan Lendl	7	3	6
(United States) Steve Meister	5	6	1
7	(Australia) Brad Drewett	2	3
4	(United States) Jimmy Arias	6	6
5	(United States) Johan Kriek	6	3	2
2	(United States) John McEnroe	4	6	6

Semifinals
1	(United States) Jimmy Connors	0	0
3	(Czechoslovakia) Ivan Lendl	6	6
4	(United States) Jimmy Arias	1	2
2	(United States) John McEnroe	6	6

Final
3	(Czechoslovakia) Ivan Lendl	4	2
2	(United States) John McEnroe	6	6

=== Top half ===
==== Section 1 ====
First round
(South Africa) D Visser	6	6
(Nigeria) N Odizor	0	3
(Bolivia) M Martínez	3	4
(United States) D Saltz	6	6
(United States) J Lapidus	6	6
(Brazil) G Barbosa	0	3
(South Africa) C van Rensburg	2	6	6
(United States) T Moor	6	3	7

Second round
1	(United States) J Connors	6	6
(South Africa) D Visser	4	3
(United States) D Saltz	6	7
11	(Australia) J Fitzgerald	2	6
13	(United States) A Krickstein	6	6
(United States) J Lapidus	1	4
(United States) T Moor	5	3
6	(United States) V Gerulaitis	7	6

Third round
1	(United States) J Connors	6	6
(United States) D Saltz	3	0
13	(United States) A Krickstein	6	6
6	(United States) V Gerulaitis	1	3

Quarterfinals
1	(United States) J Connors	3	6	6
13	(United States) A Krickstein	6	2	1

==== Section 2 ====
First round
(United States) J Sadri	6	6
(United States) M Davis	2	3
(United States) T Wilkison	6	6
(United States) R Royer	3	1
(India) R Krishnan	7	6
10	(Chile) P Rebolledo	6	1
(United States) R Harmon	3	5
Q	(United States) P Fleming	6	7
(Finland) L Palin	4	6
(United States) S Meister	6	7
(United States) R Evett	7	1	3
(South Africa) E Edwards	5	6	6

Second round
3	(Czechoslovakia) I Lendl	6	6
(United States) J Sadri	1	4
(United States) T Wilkison	4	6	5
(India) R Krishnan	6	4	7
Q	(United States) P Fleming	5	6
(United States) S Meister	7	7
(South Africa) E Edwards	7	5	6
8	(United States) S Mayer	5	7	3

Third round
3	(Czechoslovakia) I Lendl	6	3	6
(India) R Krishnan	2	6	1
(United States) S Meister	6	6
(South Africa) E Edwards	3	1

Quarterfinals
3	(Czechoslovakia) I Lendl	7	3	6
(United States) S Meister	5	6	1

=== Bottom half ===
==== Section 3 ====
First round
(Republic of Ireland) M Doyle	w	/	o
(Australia) K Warwick
(United States) B Testerman	6	6
(United States) E Dibbs	4	4
(South Africa) R Venter	5	1
(United States) P Lehnhoff	7	6
(United States) G Layendecker	3	7	4
(United States) D Pate	6	5	6
(Australia) D Carter	2	0
(Argentina) H de la Peña	6	6
(United States) E Fernández	0	2
(United States) B Manson	6	6

Second round
7	(Australia) B Drewett	4	7	6
(Republic of Ireland) M Doyle	6	5	3
(United States) B Testerman	6	7
(United States) P Lehnhoff	2	5
(United States) D Pate	4	7	6
(Argentina) H de la Peña	6	6	2
(United States) B Manson	6	3	0
4	(United States) J Arias	4	6	6

Third round
7	(Australia) B Drewett	7	7
(United States) B Testerman	6	5
(United States) D Pate	6	6	2
4	(United States) J Arias	3	7	6

Quarterfinals
7	(Australia) B Drewett	2	3
4	(United States) J Arias	6	6

==== Section 4 ====
First round
(United States) L Shiras	7	6
(Belgium) J Vanlangendonck	5	2
(South Africa) B Levine	6	6
(United States) B Nealon	4	3
(Sweden) M Tideman	2	5
(United States) S Denton	6	7
(South Africa) D Tarr	6	6
(United States) E Iskersky	1	1

Second round
5	(United States) J Kriek	6	6
(United States) L Shiras	3	0
(South Africa) B Levine	7	6
12	(United States) B Gottfried	5	2
9	(United States) M Bauer	3	2
(United States) S Denton	6	6
(South Africa) D Tarr	3	4
2	(United States) J McEnroe	6	6

Third round
5	(United States) J Kriek	6	7
(South Africa) B Levine	3	6
(United States) S Denton	3	2
2	(United States) J McEnroe	6	6

Quarterfinals
5	(United States) J Kriek	6	3	2
2	(United States) J McEnroe	4	6	6

== See also ==
- Lendl–McEnroe rivalry
