= 1984 WCT Tournament of Champions – Doubles =

Doubles
- 1984 WCT Tournament of Champions

Final
- Champions: (United States) David Dowlen (Nigeria) Nduka Odizor
- Runners-up: (United States) Ernie Fernández (United States) David Pate
- Score: 7–6, 7–5

Details
- Draw: 32
- Seeds: 8

Events
Singles	Doubles
- WCT Tournament of Champions

Tracy Delatte and Johan Kriek were the defending champions, but lost in quarterfinals to Mike Bauer and Steve Denton.

David Dowlen and Nduka Odizor won the title by defeating Ernie Fernández and David Pate 7–6, 7–5 in the final.

== Seeds ==
1. (United States) Peter Fleming / (United States) John McEnroe (semifinals)
2. (United States) Mike Bauer / (United States) Steve Denton (semifinals)
3. (United States) David Dowlen / (Nigeria) Nduka Odizor (champions)
4. (United States) Brian Gottfried / (United States) Steve Meister (second round)
5. (Australia) Brad Drewett / (Australia) John Fitzgerald (quarterfinals)
6. (South Africa) Eddie Edwards / (South Africa) Danie Visser (first round)
7. (United States) Drew Gitlin / (United States) Larry Stefanki (second round)
8. (United States) Tracy Delatte / (United States) Johan Kriek (quarterfinals)

== Draw ==
Key

- Q = Qualifier
- WC = Wild card
- LL = Lucky loser
- Alt = Alternate
- ITF = ITF entry
- PR = Protected ranking
- SR = Special ranking
- SE = Special exempt
- JE = Junior exempt
- JR = Junior Accelerator Programme entrant
- CO = College Accelerator Programme entrant
- NG = Next Gen Accelerator Program entrant
- w/o = Walkover
- r = Retired
- d = Defaulted

=== Finals ===
Semifinals
1	(United States) Peter Fleming (United States) John McEnroe	6	2
3	(United States) David Dowlen (Nigeria) Nduka Odizor	7	6
(United States) Ernie Fernández (United States) David Pate	6	6
2	(United States) Mike Bauer (United States) Steve Denton	2	2

Final
3	(United States) David Dowlen (Nigeria) Nduka Odizor	7	7
(United States) Ernie Fernández (United States) David Pate	6	5

=== Top half ===
First round
1	(United States) P Fleming (United States) J McEnroe	6	6
(United States) E Iskersky (United States) M Vines	2	2
(Czechoslovakia) I Lendl (United States) R Meyer	6	4	6
(South Africa) B Levine (Australia) C Miller	3	6	3
(United States) G Layendecker (United States) P Lehnhoff	5	6	3
(India) A Amritraj (United States) L Bourne	7	2	6
(Bolivia) M Martínez (Argentina) E Ruiz-Bry	1	5
5	(Australia) B Drewett (Australia) J Fitzgerald	6	7
3	(United States) D Dowlen (Nigeria) N Odizor	7	7
(United States) R Crowley (United States) R Evett	5	6
(United States) M Davis (Republic of Ireland) M Doyle	4	1
(United States) T Moor (United States) T Wilkison	6	6
(United States) J Arias (United States) B Gilbert	7	6
(Australia) D Carter (South Africa) D Tarr	6	4
(United States) Robert Crames (United States) Ray Disco	4	1
7	(United States) D Gitlin (United States) L Stefanki	6	6

Second round
1	(United States) P Fleming (United States) J McEnroe	6	6
(Czechoslovakia) I Lendl (United States) R Meyer	4	4
(India) A Amritraj (United States) L Bourne	4	7	5
5	(Australia) B Drewett (Australia) J Fitzgerald	6	6	7
3	(United States) D Dowlen (Nigeria) N Odizor	3	6	6
(United States) T Moor (United States) T Wilkison	6	3	4
(United States) J Arias (United States) B Gilbert	6	4	6
7	(United States) D Gitlin (United States) L Stefanki	3	6	4

Quarterfinals
1	(United States) P Fleming (United States) J McEnroe	6	6
5	(Australia) B Drewett (Australia) J Fitzgerald	2	3
3	(United States) D Dowlen (Nigeria) N Odizor	3	6	7
(United States) J Arias (United States) B Gilbert	6	2	5

Semifinals
1	(United States) P Fleming (United States) J McEnroe	6	2
3	(United States) D Dowlen (Nigeria) N Odizor	7	6

=== Bottom half ===
First round
6	(South Africa) E Edwards (South Africa) D Visser	6	6	6
(Finland) L Palin (South Africa) C van Rensburg	3	7	7
(United States) J Delaney (United States) B Nealon	6	6
(United States) K Jones (United States) Anthony Velo	2	3
(United States) M Brunnberg (United States) L Shiras	6	3	4
(United States) E Fernández (United States) D Pate	4	6	6
(United States) A Scheinman (Belgium) J Vanlangendonck	2	2
4	(United States) B Gottfried (United States) S Meister	6	6
8	(United States) T Delatte (United States) J Kriek	3	7	6
(United States) B Manson (United States) M Mitchell	6	6	2
(United States) C Strode (Sweden) M Tideman	6	5	4
(United States) J Sadri (United States) B Testerman	3	7	6
(United States) D Saltz (South Africa) R Venter	6	6
(United States) Todd Furniss (United States) Wayne Sewall	2	2
(Brazil) G Barbosa (United States) R Royer	5	1
2	(United States) M Bauer (United States) S Denton	7	6

Second round
(Finland) L Palin (South Africa) C van Rensburg	6	6	6
(United States) J Delaney (United States) B Nealon	7	2	3
(United States) E Fernández (United States) D Pate	6	6
4	(United States) B Gottfried (United States) S Meister	3	4
8	(United States) T Delatte (United States) J Kriek	6	6
(United States) J Sadri (United States) B Testerman	4	3
(United States) D Saltz (South Africa) R Venter	4	3
2	(United States) M Bauer (United States) S Denton	6	6

Quarterfinals
(Finland) L Palin (South Africa) C van Rensburg	2	1
(United States) E Fernández (United States) D Pate	6	6
8	(United States) T Delatte (United States) J Kriek	4	3
2	(United States) M Bauer (United States) S Denton	6	6

Semifinals
(United States) E Fernández (United States) D Pate	6	6
2	(United States) M Bauer (United States) S Denton	2	2
