= 1984 WCT Tournament of Champions =

- Date: May 6–13
- Edition: 8th
- Category: World Championship Tennis
- Draw: 52S / 32D
- Prize money: $300,000
- Surface: Clay / outdoor
- Location: Forest Hills, Queens, New York
- Venue: West Side Tennis Club

Champions

Singles
- (United States) John McEnroe

Doubles
- (United States) David Dowlen / (Nigeria) Nduka Odizor
← 1983 ·	WCT Tournament of Champions	· 1985 →

The 1984 WCT Tournament of Champions was a men's tennis tournament played on outdoor clay courts in Forest Hills, Queens, New York City in the United States that was part of the World Championship Tennis circuit. It was the eighth edition of the tournament and was held from May 6 through May 13, 1984. Second-seeded John McEnroe won his second consecutive singles title at the event.

== Finals ==
=== Singles ===
(United States) John McEnroe defeated (Czechoslovakia) Ivan Lendl 6–4, 6–2

- It was McEnroe's 6th singles title of the year and the 52nd of his career.

=== Doubles ===
(United States) David Dowlen / (Nigeria) Nduka Odizor defeated (United States) Ernie Fernandez / (United States) David Pate 7–6, 7–5

== See also ==
- Lendl–McEnroe rivalry
