= 1986 Transamerica Open – Doubles =

Doubles
- 1986 Transamerica Open

Final
- Champions: (United States) Peter Fleming (United States) John McEnroe
- Runners-up: (United States) Mike De Palmer (United States) Gary Donnelly
- Score: 6–4, 7–6^{(7–2)}

Details
- Draw: 16 (1WC)
- Seeds: 4

Events
Singles	Doubles
← 1985 ·	Pacific Coast Championships	· 1987 →

Paul Annacone and Christo van Rensburg were the defending champions, but Annacone opted to rest to compete at the Davis Cup semi-finals the following week. Van Rensburg teamed up with Eddie Edwards and lost in the first round to Chip Hooper and Mike Leach.

Peter Fleming and John McEnroe won the title by defeating Mike De Palmer and Gary Donnelly 6–4, 7–6^{(7–2)} in the final.

== Seeds ==
1. (United States) Mike De Palmer / (United States) Gary Donnelly (final)
2. (United States) Sherwood Stewart / (Australia) Kim Warwick (semi-finals)
3. (United States) Chip Hooper / (United States) Mike Leach (quarter-finals)
4. (United States) Peter Fleming / (United States) John McEnroe (champions)

== Draw ==
=== Key ===
- Q = Qualifier
- WC = Wild card
- LL = Lucky loser
- Alt = Alternate
- SE = Special exempt
- PR = Protected ranking
- ITF = ITF entry
- JE = Junior exempt
- w/o = Walkover
- r = Retired
- d = Defaulted
- SR = Special ranking

=== Draw ===
First round
1	(United States) M De Palmer (United States) G Donnelly	7	7
(United States) G Layendecker (Canada) G Michibata	6	5
WC	(United States) H Pfister (United States) L Stefanki	3	7	5
(United States) A Kohlberg (United States) R Van't Hof	6	6	7
3	(United States) C Hooper (United States) M Leach	7	7
(South Africa) E Edwards (South Africa) C van Rensburg	6	6
(United States) G Holmes (United States) T Nelson	6	1
(United States) J Letts (Sweden) P Lundgren	7	6
(United States) D Dowlen (Nigeria) N Odizor	3	2
(South Africa) C Steyn (South Africa) D Visser	6	6
(Australia) B Dyke (United States) B Green	6	3
4	(United States) P Fleming (United States) J McEnroe	7	6
(United States) M Davis (United States) K Richter	4	3
(United States) B Schultz (United States) T Witsken	6	6
(United States) S Denton (United States) M Mitchell	3	6
2	(United States) S Stewart (Australia) K Warwick	6	7

Quarter-finals
1	(United States) M De Palmer (United States) G Donnelly	6	6
(United States) A Kohlberg (United States) R Van't Hof	3	4
3	(United States) C Hooper (United States) M Leach	6	6	3
(United States) J Letts (Sweden) P Lundgren	7	2	6
(South Africa) C Steyn (South Africa) D Visser	7	3	6
4	(United States) P Fleming (United States) J McEnroe	6	6	7
(United States) B Schultz (United States) T Witsken	1	6
2	(United States) S Stewart (Australia) K Warwick	6	7

Semi-finals
1	(United States) M De Palmer (United States) G Donnelly	6	7
(United States) J Letts (Sweden) P Lundgren	3	6
4	(United States) P Fleming (United States) J McEnroe	6	6
2	(United States) S Stewart (Australia) K Warwick	4	4

Final
1	(United States) M De Palmer (United States) G Donnelly	4	6^{2}
4	(United States) P Fleming (United States) J McEnroe	6	7^{7}
