= 1981 Japan Open Tennis Championships – Men's singles =

Men's singles
- 1981 Japan Open Tennis Championships

Final
- Champion: (Hungary) Balázs Taróczy
- Runner-up: (United States) Eliot Teltscher
- Score: 6–3, 1–6, 7–6

Details
- Draw: 64 (7Q)
- Seeds: 16

Events
Singles	men	women
Doubles	men	women
- Japan Open

Ivan Lendl was the defending champion, but he chose to compete at Vienna during the same week, winning that tournament.

Balázs Taróczy won the Tokyo title by defeating Eliot Teltscher 6–3, 1–6, 7–6 in the final.

== Seeds ==
1. (United States) Eliot Teltscher (final)
2. (Hungary) Balázs Taróczy (champion)
3. (Poland) Wojciech Fibak (quarterfinals)
4. (United States) Mel Purcell (quarterfinals)
5. (Argentina) Ricardo Cano (quarterfinals)
6. (United States) Peter Rennert (first round)
7. (Switzerland) Heinz Günthardt (third round)
8. (United States) Terry Moor (quarterfinals)
9. (India) Ramesh Krishnan (first round)
10. (United States) Tim Gullikson (third round)
11. (United States) Pat DuPré (semifinals)
12. (United Kingdom) Buster Mottram (third round)
13. (United States) Martin Davis (third round)
14. (United States) Larry Stefanki (third round)
15. (United States) Scott McCain (second round)
16. (United States) James Delaney (third round)

== Draw ==
Key

- Q = Qualifier
- WC = Wild card
- LL = Lucky loser
- Alt = Alternate
- ITF = ITF entry
- PR = Protected ranking
- SR = Special ranking
- SE = Special exempt
- JE = Junior exempt
- JR = Junior Accelerator Programme entrant
- CO = College Accelerator Programme entrant
- NG = Next Gen Accelerator Program entrant
- w/o = Walkover
- r = Retired
- d = Defaulted

=== Finals ===
Quarterfinals
1	(United States) Eliot Teltscher	6	6
8	(United States) Terry Moor	1	4
4	(United States) Mel Purcell	6	5
(United States) Van Winitsky	7	7
11	(United States) Pat DuPré	7	6
3	(Poland) Wojciech Fibak	6	4
5	(Argentina) Ricardo Cano	3	1
2	(Hungary) Balázs Taróczy	6	6

Semifinals
1	(United States) Eliot Teltscher	6	6
(United States) Van Winitsky	4	4
11	(United States) Pat DuPré	3	6	2
2	(Hungary) Balázs Taróczy	6	4	6

Final
1	(United States) Eliot Teltscher	3	6	6
2	(Hungary) Balázs Taróczy	6	1	7

=== Top half ===
==== Section 1 ====
First round
1	(United States) E Teltscher	6	6
(Japan) Yoshito Nakamura	0	1
(Japan) T Kuramitsu	2	2
(Japan) T Fukui	6	6
(Japan) Toshio Iwasawa	3	1
(United States) C Dunk	6	6
Q	(Japan) S Kato	5	0
12	(United Kingdom) B Mottram	7	6
14	(United States) L Stefanki	6	6
(Japan) Nobuya Tamura	1	1
Q	(Japan) Haruhiko Matsunaga	7	4	1
Q	(Japan) Taisen Kanai	5	6	6
(United States) Bob Weise	6	6
(Japan) Tokio Nishiwaki	4	0
(Japan) Yoshiya Hamano	1	2
8	(United States) T Moor	6	6

Second round
1	(United States) E Teltscher	6	6
(Japan) T Fukui	1	2
(United States) C Dunk	2	0
12	(United Kingdom) B Mottram	6	6
14	(United States) L Stefanki	6	6
Q	(Japan) T Kanai	0	3
(United States) B Weise	3	4
8	(United States) T Moor	6	6

Third round
1	(United States) E Teltscher	5	7	6
12	(United Kingdom) B Mottram	7	5	3
14	(United States) L Stefanki	5	4
8	(United States) T Moor	7	6

Quarterfinals
1	(United States) E Teltscher	6	6
8	(United States) T Moor	1	4

==== Section 2 ====
First round
4	(United States) M Purcell	6	6
(United States) Bill Shivar	2	3
(Japan) Hirato Shibata	4	6	6
(Japan) Yukihiko Murata	6	1	3
(Japan) Shinichi Nishino	5	2
Q	(United States) B Webb	7	6
(Japan) Naomi Uemura	2	2
10	(United States) T Gullikson	6	6
16	(United States) J Delaney	7	7
(United States) L Bourne	5	5
Q	(Japan) Noriyuki Washida	4	3
(Japan) Kunio Tsukamoto	6	6
(United States) M Estep	7	4	0
(United States) V Winitsky	6	6	6
(United States) D Dowlen	7	4	6
6	(United States) P Rennert	6	6	1

Second round
4	(United States) M Purcell	6	6
(Japan) H Shibata	2	2
Q	(United States) B Webb	1	2
10	(United States) T Gullikson	6	6
16	(United States) J Delaney	6	6	6
(Japan) K Tsukamoto	3	7	4
(United States) V Winitsky	6	6
(United States) D Dowlen	0	1

Third round
4	(United States) M Purcell	6	6	6
10	(United States) T Gullikson	3	7	3
16	(United States) J Delaney	7	4	4
(United States) V Winitsky	6	6	6

Quarterfinals
4	(United States) M Purcell	6	5
(United States) V Winitsky	7	7

=== Bottom half ===
==== Section 3 ====
First round
7	(Switzerland) H Günthardt	6	7
(United States) Weller Evans	2	5
(Japan) S Sakamoto	7	6
(Japan) Toyokazu Tomogane	5	1
(Japan) H Shirato	7	6
(Japan) K Tanabe	5	1
(Japan) Akinori Naguro	1	3
11	(United States) P DuPré	6	6
13	(United States) M Davis	5	6	7
(India) S Menon	7	3	6
(Switzerland) I Dupasquier	6	6
(Japan) Wataru Fujii	0	1
(Japan) E Takeuchi	6	2	6
(Japan) Etsuo Uchiyama	2	6	4
Q	(Japan) Takao Yamamoto	3	3
3	(Poland) W Fibak	6	6

Second round
7	(Switzerland) H Günthardt	6	2	6
(Japan) S Sakamoto	4	6	1
(Japan) H Shirato	1	2
11	(United States) P DuPré	6	6
13	(United States) M Davis	7	6
(Switzerland) I Dupasquier	6	1
(Japan) E Takeuchi	2	5
3	(Poland) W Fibak	6	7

Third round
7	(Switzerland) H Günthardt	5	2
11	(United States) P DuPré	7	6
13	(United States) M Davis	6	4	0
3	(Poland) W Fibak	3	6	6

Quarterfinals
11	(United States) P DuPré	7	6
3	(Poland) W Fibak	6	4

==== Section 4 ====
First round
5	(Argentina) R Cano	6	7
(Japan) Kiyoshi Miyanami	3	5
(United States) J Bailey	6	6
(Japan) K Hirai	4	2
(United States) R Van't Hof	6	6
(Netherlands) E Wilborts	2	1
(United States) Nial Brash	0	3
15	(United States) S McCain	6	6
9	(India) R Krishnan	2	6
(Japan) J Kuki	6	7
(Japan) S Nishio	6	6
(Japan) T Yonezawa	3	1
(United States) D Gitlin	6	3	7
(Philippines) B Sison	1	6	5
Q	(Japan) S Shiraishi	0	1
2	(Hungary) B Taróczy	6	6

Second round
5	(Argentina) R Cano	5	6	6
(United States) J Bailey	7	3	2
(United States) R Van't Hof	6	1	6
15	(United States) S McCain	2	6	3
(Japan) J Kuki	6	6
(Japan) S Nishio	3	4
(United States) D Gitlin	4	2
2	(Hungary) B Taróczy	6	6

Third round
5	(Argentina) R Cano	6	6
(United States) R Van't Hof	3	1
(Japan) J Kuki	1	2
2	(Hungary) B Taróczy	6	6

Quarterfinals
5	(Argentina) R Cano	3	1
2	(Hungary) B Taróczy	6	6
