= 1985 Transamerica Open – Doubles =

Doubles
- 1985 Transamerica Open

Final
- Champion: (United States) Paul Annacone (South Africa) Christo van Rensburg
- Runner-up: (United States) Brad Gilbert (United States) Sandy Mayer
- Score: 3–6, 6–3, 6–4

Details
- Draw: 16
- Seeds: 4

Events
Singles	Doubles
← 1984 ·	Pacific Coast Championships	· 1986 →

The 1985 Transamerica Open – Doubles was an event of the 1985 Transamerica Open tennis tournament and was played on indoor carpet courts at the Cow Palace in San Francisco, California in the United States from September 23 through September 29, 1985. The draw comprised 16 teams of which four were seeded. Peter Fleming and John McEnroe were the defending Pacific Coast Championships doubles champion but did not compete together in this edition. The first-seeded team of Paul Annacone and Christo van Rensburg won the title by defeating the unseeded team of Brad Gilbert and Sandy Mayer in the final, 3–6, 6–3, 6–4.

== Seeds ==
1. (United States) Paul Annacone / (South Africa) Christo van Rensburg (champions)
2. (United States) Sherwood Stewart / (Australia) Kim Warwick (first round)
3. (United States) Steve Denton / (United States) Peter Fleming (semifinals)
4. (United States) Tom Gullikson / (United States) David Pate (first round)

== Draw ==
=== Key ===
- Q = Qualifier
- WC = Wild card
- LL = Lucky loser
- Alt = Alternate
- SE = Special exempt
- PR = Protected ranking
- ITF = ITF entry
- JE = Junior exempt
- w/o = Walkover
- r = Retired
- d = Defaulted
- SR = Special ranking

First Round
1	(United States) Paul Annacone (South Africa) Christo van Rensburg	7	7
(United States) Marty Davis (United States) Chris Dunk	6	6
(United States) Bob Green (United States) Bud Schultz	4	7	7
(United States) Steve DeVries (United States) Randy Nixon	6	6	5
3	(United States) Steve Denton (United States) Peter Fleming	6	4	6
(United States) Larry Stefanki (United States) Robert Van't Hof	3	6	4
(Australia) David Graham (United States) Ben Testerman	7	6	4
(United States) Matt Anger (United States) Greg Holmes	5	7	6
(United States) Glenn Layendecker (Canada) Glenn Michibata	4	7	6
(United States) Brad Gilbert (United States) Sandy Mayer	6	6	7
(United States) Drew Gitlin (United States) Matt Mitchell	6	6
4	(United States) Tom Gullikson (United States) David Pate	4	4
(United States) Jimmy Arias (United States) Eliot Teltscher	6	4
(United States) Mark Dickson (United States) Tim Wilkison	7	6
(United States) Terry Moor (United States) Butch Walts	7	6
2	(United States) Sherwood Stewart (Australia) Kim Warwick	5	3

Quarterfinals
1	(United States) Paul Annacone (South Africa) Christo van Rensburg	6	6
(United States) Bob Green (United States) Bud Schultz	2	3
3	(United States) Steve Denton (United States) Peter Fleming	6	6
(United States) Matt Anger (United States) Greg Holmes	4	2
(United States) Brad Gilbert (United States) Sandy Mayer	6	6
(United States) Drew Gitlin (United States) Matt Mitchell	4	2
(United States) Mark Dickson (United States) Tim Wilkison	6	3
(United States) Terry Moor (United States) Butch Walts	7	6

Semifinals
1	(United States) Paul Annacone (South Africa) Christo van Rensburg	6	6
3	(United States) Steve Denton (United States) Peter Fleming	2	4
(United States) Brad Gilbert (United States) Sandy Mayer	7	6
(United States) Terry Moor (United States) Butch Walts	5	4

Final
1	(United States) Paul Annacone (South Africa) Christo van Rensburg	3	6	6
(United States) Brad Gilbert (United States) Sandy Mayer	6	3	4
