= 1981 Japan Open Tennis Championships =

Tennis tournament

- Date: 19–22 October
- Edition: 8th
- Surface: Hard / outdoor
- Location: Tokyo, Japan

Champions

Men's singles
- (Hungary) Balázs Taróczy

Women's singles
- (Czechoslovakia) Marie Pinterová

Men's doubles
- (Hungary) Balázs Taróczy / (Switzerland) Heinz Günthardt

Women's doubles
- (Brazil) Patricia Medrado / (Brazil) Cláudia Monteiro
- Japan Open

The 1981 Japan Open Tennis Championships was a combined men's and women's tennis tournament played on outdoor hard courts in Tokyo, Japan that was part of the 1981 Avon Championships World Championship Series and the 1981 Volvo Grand Prix. It was the eighth edition of the tournament and was held from 19 October through 25 October 1981. Balázs Taróczy and Marie Pinterová won the singles titles.

== Finals ==
=== Men's singles ===
(Hungary) Balázs Taróczy defeated (United States) Eliot Teltscher 6–3, 1–6, 7–6^{(7–3)}

- It was Taróczy's 2nd and last singles title of the year and the 11th of his career.

=== Women's singles ===
(Czechoslovakia) Marie Pinterová defeated (United States) Pam Casale 2–6, 6–4, 6–1

- It was Pinterová's only singles title of the year and the 2nd and last of her career.

=== Men's doubles ===
(Hungary) Balázs Taróczy / (Switzerland) Heinz Günthardt defeated (United States) Larry Stefanki / (United States) Robert Van't Hof 3–6, 6–2, 6–1

- It was Taróczy's 6th and last doubles title of the year and the 14th of his career. It was Günthardt's 8th and last doubles title of the year and the 14th of his career.

=== Women's doubles ===
(Brazil) Patricia Medrado / (Brazil) Cláudia Monteiro defeated (United States) Barbara Jordan / (United States) Roberta McCallum 6–3, 3–6, 6–2

- It was Medrado's only doubles title of the year and the 1st of her career. It was Monteiro's only doubles title of the year and the 1st of her career.
