= 1984 Congoleum Classic – Singles =

Singles
- 1984 Congoleum Classic

Final
- Champion: (United States) Jimmy Connors
- Runner-up: (France) Yannick Noah
- Score: 6–2, 6–7, 6–3

Details
- Draw: 56
- Seeds: 16

Events
Singles	Doubles
- Congoleum Classic

The 1984 Congoleum Classic was a tennis tournament held February 13, 1984, in California. In singles, José Higueras was the defending champion but lost in the semifinals to Jimmy Connors.

It was played at the La Quinta Resort and Club in La Quinta, California in the United States.

Connors won in the final 6–2, 6–7, 6–3 against Yannick Noah.

== Seeds ==
The top eight seeds received a bye into the second round.

1. (United States) Jimmy Connors (champion)
2. (France) Yannick Noah (final)
3. (United States) Jimmy Arias (semifinals)
4. (Spain) José Higueras (semifinals)
5. (United States) Eliot Teltscher (quarterfinals)
6. (United States) Tim Mayotte (quarterfinals)
7. (United States) Vitas Gerulaitis (second round)
8. (United States) Brian Gottfried (third round)
9. (United States) Scott Davis (quarterfinals)
10. (United States) Brian Teacher (third round)
11. (United States) Robert Van't Hof (second round)
12. (United States) Tim Gullikson (first round)
13. (United States) Hank Pfister (third round)
14. (Israel) Shlomo Glickstein (quarterfinals)
15. (United States) Roscoe Tanner (second round)
16. (United States) Brad Gilbert (second round)

== Draw ==
Key

- Q = Qualifier
- WC = Wild card
- LL = Lucky loser
- Alt = Alternate
- ITF = ITF entry
- PR = Protected ranking
- SR = Special ranking
- SE = Special exempt
- JE = Junior exempt
- JR = Junior Accelerator Programme entrant
- CO = College Accelerator Programme entrant
- NG = Next Gen Accelerator Program entrant
- w/o = Walkover
- r = Retired
- d = Defaulted

=== Finals ===
Semifinals
1	(United States) Jimmy Connors	6	6	7
4	(Spain) José Higueras	7	0	6
3	(United States) Jimmy Arias	4	6	4
2	(France) Yannick Noah	6	4	6

Final
1	(United States) Jimmy Connors	6	6	6
2	(France) Yannick Noah	2	7	3

=== Top half ===
==== Section 1 ====
First round
(Canada) G Michibata	6	7
(United States) N Saviano	2	5
(Socialist Federal Republic of Yugoslavia) M Ostoja	6	3	4
(United States) R Lutz	2	6	6
(France) T Tulasne	3	2
15	(United States) R Tanner	6	6
13	(United States) H Pfister	7	3	6
(United States) J Borowiak	6	6	2
(United States) J Brown	1	3
Q	(United States) B Manson	6	6
(United States) B Testerman	1	6	3
(South Africa) B Mitton	6	0	6

Second round
1	(United States) J Connors	6	6
(Canada) G Michibata	2	3
(United States) R Lutz	7	6
15	(United States) R Tanner	6	3
13	(United States) H Pfister	6	6
Q	(United States) B Manson	2	1
(South Africa) B Mitton	5	4
6	(United States) T Mayotte	7	6

Third round
1	(United States) J Connors	6	6
(United States) R Lutz	1	2
13	(United States) H Pfister	2	2
6	(United States) T Mayotte	6	6

Quarterfinals
1	(United States) J Connors	6	6
6	(United States) T Mayotte	2	1

==== Section 2 ====
First round
(Hungary) Z Kuharszky	1	4
(Brazil) C Motta	6	6
(United Kingdom) J Lloyd	7	6
Q	(United States) D Saltz	6	2
(Bolivia) M Martinez	3	3
11	(United States) R Van't Hof	6	6
9	(United States) S Davis	6	6
(United States) L Stefanki	3	3
(United States) A Krickstein	5
(United States) D Stockton	7	r
(Chile) R Acuña	6	3
(United States) E Fromm	7	6

Second round
4	(Spain) J Higueras	2	6	6
(Brazil) C Motta	6	0	3
(United Kingdom) J Lloyd	6	6
11	(United States) R Van't Hof	1	3
9	(United States) S Davis	6	6
(United States) A Krickstein	2	4
(United States) E Fromm	2	6	3
8	(United States) B Gottfried	6	2	6

Third round
4	(Spain) J Higueras	6	6
(United Kingdom) J Lloyd	4	3
9	(United States) S Davis	6	4	6
8	(United States) B Gottfried	3	6	4

Quarterfinals
4	(Spain) J Higueras	6	6
9	(United States) S Davis	1	3

=== Bottom half ===
==== Section 3 ====
First round
Q	(Puerto Rico) E Fernandez	6	6
(United States) M Bauer	1	1
(West Germany) H-D Beutel	4	6
Q	(United States) G Holmes	6	7
(India) R Krishnan	4	7	2
14	(Israel) S Glickstein	6	5	6
16	(United States) B Gilbert	7	6
(United States) M Davis	5	4
(Uruguay) D Pérez	3	4
Q	(United States) D Pate	6	6
Q	(United States) T Giammalva	6	3	4
(Italy) C Panatta	3	6	6

Second round
7	(United States) V Gerulaitis	6	3
Q	(Puerto Rico) E Fernandez	7	6
Q	(United States) G Holmes	4	6	3
14	(Israel) S Glickstein	6	1	6
16	(United States) B Gilbert	4	5
Q	(United States) D Pate	6	7
(Italy) C Panatta	5	1
3	(United States) J Arias	7	6

Third round
Q	(Puerto Rico) E Fernandez	3	6	3
14	(Israel) S Glickstein	6	3	6
Q	(United States) D Pate	6	5	6
3	(United States) J Arias	3	7	7

Quarterfinals
14	(Israel) S Glickstein	3	6
3	(United States) J Arias	6	7

==== Section 4 ====
First round
(Romania) I Năstase	2	6	7
(United States) S Meister	6	3	6
(Mexico) J Lozano	6	3	6
(United States) M Dickson	4	6	7
(United States) M De Palmer	2	6	6
12	(United States) T Gullikson	6	4	3
10	(United States) B Teacher	7	6
(Italy) G Ocleppo	6	1
Q	(South Africa) E Edwards	7	6
(United States) M Leach	6	3
(United States) S Smith	2	6
(United States) T Moor	6	7

Second round
5	(United States) E Teltscher	6	6
(Romania) I Năstase	2	2
(United States) M Dickson	6	3	5
(United States) M De Palmer	3	6	7
10	(United States) B Teacher	6	7
Q	(South Africa) E Edwards	4	6
(United States) T Moor	6	2	4
2	(France) Y Noah	4	6	6

Third round
5	(United States) E Teltscher	6	6
(United States) M De Palmer	2	4
10	(United States) B Teacher	3	3
2	(France) Y Noah	6	6

Quarterfinals
5	(United States) E Teltscher	1	0
2	(France) Y Noah	6	6
