= 1985 Transamerica Open – Singles =

Singles
- 1985 Transamerica Open

Final
- Champion: (Sweden) Stefan Edberg
- Runner-up: (United States) Johan Kriek
- Score: 6–4, 6–2

Details
- Draw: 32 (3WC / 4Q)
- Seeds: 8

Events
Singles	Doubles
← 1984 ·	Pacific Coast Championships	· 1986 →

The 1985 Transamerica Open – Singles was an event of the 1985 Transamerica Open tennis tournament and was played on indoor carpet courts at the Cow Palace in San Francisco, California in the United States from September 23 through September 29, 1985. The draw comprised 32 players and eight of them were seeded. First-seeded John McEnroe was the defending Pacific Coast Championships singles champion but he lost in the quarterfinals. Third-seeded Stefan Edberg won the title by defeating sixth-seeded Johan Kriek in the final, 6–4, 6–2.

== Seeds ==
1. (United States) John McEnroe (quarterfinals)
2. (United States) Kevin Curren (fFirst round)
3. (Sweden) Stefan Edberg (champion)
4. (United States) Eliot Teltscher (quarterfinals)
5. (United States) Tim Mayotte (quarterfinals)
6. (United States) Johan Kriek (final)
7. (United States) Brad Gilbert (quarterfinals)
8. (United States) David Pate (first round)

== Draw ==
=== Key ===
- Q = Qualifier
- WC = Wild card
- LL = Lucky loser
- Alt = Alternate
- SE = Special exempt
- PR = Protected ranking
- ITF = ITF entry
- JE = Junior exempt
- w/o = Walkover
- r = Retired
- d = Defaulted
- SR = Special ranking

=== Finals ===
Semifinals
6/WC	(United States) Johan Kriek	6	6
(United States) Bob Green	2	1
3	(Sweden) Stefan Edberg	6	3	6
(United States) Paul Annacone	2	6	1

Final
6/WC	(United States) Johan Kriek	4	2
3	(Sweden) Stefan Edberg	6	6

=== Top half ===
First Round
1	(United States) John McEnroe	6	6
(United States) Jimmy Arias	3	2
(United States) Ben Testerman	6	6
(United Kingdom) John Lloyd	7	7
WC	(United States) Patrick McEnroe	2	7	3
(United States) Greg Holmes	6	6	6
Q	(United States) Steve Denton	4	4
6/WC	(United States) Johan Kriek	6	6
4	(United States) Eliot Teltscher	1	7	6
(United States) Tim Wilkison	6	5	4
(United States) Tom Gullikson	5	6
(India) Vijay Amritraj	7	7
(United States) Matt Mitchell	6	3	4
(United States) Bob Green	4	6	6
(United States) Mark Dickson	7	6
8	(United States) David Pate	6	2

Second Round
1	(United States) John McEnroe	6	6	7
(United Kingdom) John Lloyd	1	7	6
(United States) Greg Holmes	1	2
6/WC	(United States) Johan Kriek	6	6
4	(United States) Eliot Teltscher	6	6	7
(India) Vijay Amritraj	4	7	5
(United States) Bob Green	6	7	6
(United States) Mark Dickson	7	5	2

Quarterfinals
1	(United States) John McEnroe	6	6	1
6/WC	(United States) Johan Kriek	7	3	6
4	(United States) Eliot Teltscher	6	4
(United States) Bob Green	7	6

Semifinals
6/WC	(United States) Johan Kriek	6	6
(United States) Bob Green	2	1

=== Bottom half ===
First Round
7	(United States) Brad Gilbert	6	6
(United States) Terry Moor	4	3
Q	(Canada) Glenn Michibata	7	2	3
(United States) Peter Fleming	6	6	6
(United States) Marty Davis	5	2
(United States) John Sadri	7	6
(United States) Larry Stefanki	1	1
3	(Sweden) Stefan Edberg	6	6
5	(United States) Tim Mayotte	6	6
Q	(Croatia) Marko Ostoja	4	3
(United States) Marc Flur	3	4
(United States) Mike Leach	6	6
WC	(United States) Jim Grabb	2	2
(United States) Paul Annacone	6	6
Q	(United States) Matt Anger	7	6
2	(United States) Kevin Curren	6	3

Second Round
7	(United States) Brad Gilbert	6	6
(United States) Peter Fleming	2	2
(United States) John Sadri	4	3
3	(Sweden) Stefan Edberg	6	6
5	(United States) Tim Mayotte	w/o
(United States) Mike Leach
(United States) Paul Annacone	6	3	7
Q	(United States) Matt Anger	3	6	6

Quarterfinals
7	(United States) Brad Gilbert	2	2
3	(Sweden) Stefan Edberg	6	6
5	(United States) Tim Mayotte	3	4
(United States) Paul Annacone	6	6

Semifinals
3	(Sweden) Stefan Edberg	6	3	6
(United States) Paul Annacone	2	6	1
