= 1985 Pilot Pen Classic =

- Date: February 18–25
- Edition: 12th
- Prize money: $300,000
- Surface: Hard / outdoor
- Location: La Quinta, California, U.S.
- Venue: La Quinta Resort and Club

Champions

Singles
- (United States) Larry Stefanki

Doubles
- (Switzerland) Heinz Günthardt / (Hungary) Balázs Taróczy
- Pilot Pen Classic

The 1985 Pilot Pen Classic was a men's tennis tournament played on outdoor hard courts. It was the 12th edition of the Indian Wells Masters and was part of the 1985 Nabisco Grand Prix. It was played at the La Quinta Resort and Club in La Quinta, California, in the United States, from February 18 through February 25, 1985. Unseeded Larry Stefanki, who entered the main draw on a wildcard, won the singles title.

== Finals ==
=== Singles ===
(United States) Larry Stefanki defeated (United States) David Pate 6–1, 6–4, 3–6, 6–3

- It was Stefanki's only title of the year and the 4th of his career.

=== Doubles ===
(Switzerland) Heinz Günthardt / (Hungary) Balázs Taróczy defeated (United States) Ken Flach / (United States) Robert Seguso 3–6, 7–6, 6–3

- It was Günthardt's 2nd title of the year and the 32nd of his career. It was Taróczy's 1st title of the year and the 35th of his career.

== Prize money ==
Event	W	F	SF	QF	Round of 16	Round of 32	Round of 64
Singles	$51,000	$25,500	$13,470	$7,320	$4,080	$2,310	$1,320
Doubles*	$16,200	$8,100	$4,350	$2,460	$1,500	$930	—N/a

_{*per team}
