= 1981 Japan Open Tennis Championships – Men's doubles =

Men's doubles
- 1981 Japan Open Tennis Championships

Final
- Champions: (Hungary) Balázs Taróczy (Switzerland) Heinz Günthardt
- Runners-up: (United States) Larry Stefanki (United States) Robert Van't Hof
- Score: 3–6, 6–2, 6–1

Details
- Draw: 32
- Seeds: 8

Events
Singles	men	women
Doubles	men	women
- Japan Open

Ross Case and Jaime Fillol were the defending champions, but none competed this year.

Balázs Taróczy and Heinz Günthardt won the title by defeating Larry Stefanki and Robert Van't Hof 3–6, 6–2, 6–1 in the final.

== Seeds ==
1. (Switzerland) Heinz Günthardt / (Hungary) Balázs Taróczy (champions)
2. (United States) Terry Moor / (United States) Eliot Teltscher (quarterfinals)
3. (United States) Mel Purcell / (United States) Peter Rennert (semifinals)
4. (United States) Pat DuPré / (United Kingdom) Buster Mottram (quarterfinals)
5. (United States) Lloyd Bourne / (United States) Van Winitsky (semifinals)
6. (United States) Larry Stefanki / (United States) Robert Van't Hof (final)
7. (United States) Martin Davis / (United States) Chris Dunk (quarterfinals)
8. (United States) Tim Gullikson / (United States) Scott McCain (second round)

== Draw ==
Key

- Q = Qualifier
- WC = Wild card
- LL = Lucky loser
- Alt = Alternate
- ITF = ITF entry
- PR = Protected ranking
- SR = Special ranking
- SE = Special exempt
- JE = Junior exempt
- JR = Junior Accelerator Programme entrant
- CO = College Accelerator Programme entrant
- NG = Next Gen Accelerator Program entrant
- w/o = Walkover
- r = Retired
- d = Defaulted

=== Finals ===
Semifinals
1	(Switzerland) Heinz Günthardt (Hungary) Balázs Taróczy	7	6
5	(United States) Lloyd Bourne (United States) Van Winitsky	5	4
3	(United States) Mel Purcell (United States) Peter Rennert	6	4	4
6	(United States) Larry Stefanki (United States) Robert Van't Hof	3	6	6

Final
1	(Switzerland) Heinz Günthardt (Hungary) Balázs Taróczy	3	6	6
6	(United States) Larry Stefanki (United States) Robert Van't Hof	6	2	1

=== Top half ===
First round
1	(Switzerland) H Günthardt (Hungary) B Taróczy	6	6
(Japan) Yoshiya Hamano (Japan) Koichi Sayama	2	2
(United States) D Gitlin (Philippines) B Sison	6	6
(Japan) T Fukui (Japan) T Yonezawa	1	1
(Japan) Kiyoshi Miyanami (Japan) Masayuki Uchida	6	6
(Japan) Yukihiko Murata (Japan) S Nishio	3	2
(Japan) H Shirato (Japan) Kenzo Ukon	0	5
7	(United States) M Davis (United States) C Dunk	6	7
4	(United States) P DuPré (United Kingdom) B Mottram	6	6
(Japan) Hiroyuki Bamba (Japan) Ichiro Nakanishi	0	1
(Japan) K Hirai (Japan) S Sakamoto	6	6
(Japan) Akira Kawaguchi (Japan) Noriyuki Washida	1	4
(Japan) S Nishio (Japan) Nobuya Tamura	6	6
(Japan) T Kuramitsu (Japan) Etsuo Uchiyama	3	3
(Japan) S Kato (Japan) S Shiraishi	3	2
5	(United States) L Bourne (United States) V Winitsky	6	6

Second round
1	(Switzerland) H Günthardt (Hungary) B Taróczy	5	6	6
(United States) D Gitlin (Philippines) B Sison	7	3	2
(Japan) K Miyanami (Japan) M Uchida	1	1
7	(United States) M Davis (United States) C Dunk	6	6
4	(United States) P DuPré (United Kingdom) B Mottram	6	2	6
(Japan) K Hirai (Japan) S Sakamoto	3	6	4
(Japan) S Nishio (Japan) N Tamura	3	6
5	(United States) L Bourne (United States) V Winitsky	6	7

Quarterfinals
1	(Switzerland) H Günthardt (Hungary) B Taróczy	6	6
7	(United States) M Davis (United States) C Dunk	4	4
4	(United States) P DuPré (United Kingdom) B Mottram	3	2
5	(United States) L Bourne (United States) V Winitsky	6	6

Semifinals
1	(Switzerland) H Günthardt (Hungary) B Taróczy	7	6
5	(United States) L Bourne (United States) V Winitsky	5	4

=== Bottom half ===
First round
8	(United States) T Gullikson (United States) S McCain	6	6
(Japan) Masaru Suishu (Japan) Minoru Ueda	2	4
(United States) M Estep (India) S Menon	6	6
(United States) B Webb (Netherlands) E Wilborts	4	2
(Japan) E Takeuchi (Japan) K Tanabe	6	6
(Japan) Taisen Kanai (Japan) Takao Yamamoto	3	4
(United States) J Bailey (United States) Nial Brash	3	4
3	(United States) M Purcell (United States) P Rennert	6	6
6	(United States) L Stefanki (United States) R Van't Hof	6	6
(Japan) Toyokazu Tomogane (Japan) Nobuo Yoshida	0	1
(United States) D Dowlen (Switzerland) I Dupasquier	6	7
(Japan) Yoshito Nakamura (Japan) Takao Suzuki	3	6
(Argentina) R Cano (India) R Krishnan	6	6
(Japan) ? Hoshono (Japan) Akinori Naguro	3	3
(United States) Weller Evans (United States) Bob Weise	2	1
2	(United States) T Moor (United States) E Teltscher	6	6

Second round
8	(United States) T Gullikson (United States) S McCain	6	4	5
(United States) M Estep (India) S Menon	4	6	7
(Japan) E Takeuchi (Japan) K Tanabe	2	5
3	(United States) M Purcell (United States) P Rennert	6	7
6	(United States) L Stefanki (United States) R Van't Hof	6	7
(United States) D Dowlen (Switzerland) I Dupasquier	3	6
(Argentina) R Cano (India) R Krishnan	1	6
2	(United States) T Moor (United States) E Teltscher	6	7

Quarterfinals
(United States) M Estep (India) S Menon	6	0
3	(United States) M Purcell (United States) P Rennert	7	6
6	(United States) L Stefanki (United States) R Van't Hof	6	6
2	(United States) T Moor (United States) E Teltscher	3	3

Semifinals
3	(United States) M Purcell (United States) P Rennert	6	4	4
6	(United States) L Stefanki (United States) R Van't Hof	3	6	6
