= 1984 Congoleum Classic – Doubles =

Doubles
- 1984 Congoleum Classic

Final
- Champions: (South Africa) Bernard Mitton (United States) Butch Walts
- Runners-up: (United States) Scott Davis (United States) Ferdi Taygan
- Score: 5–7, 6–3, 6–2

Details
- Draw: 28
- Seeds: 8

Events
Singles	Doubles
- Congoleum Classic

Brian Gottfried and Raúl Ramírez were the defending champions but only Gottfried competed that year with Victor Amaya.

Amaya and Gottfried lost in the second round to Martin Davis and Chris Dunk.

Bernard Mitton and Butch Walts won in the final 5–7, 6–3, 6–2 against Scott Davis and Ferdi Taygan.

== Seeds ==
The top four seeded teams received byes into the second round.

1. (United States) Tim Gullikson / (United States) Sherwood Stewart (second round)
2. (United States) Mark Dickson / (Brazil) Cássio Motta (second round)
3. (United States) Steve Meister / (United States) Brian Teacher (quarterfinals)
4. (United States) Scott Davis / (United States) Ferdi Taygan (final)
5. (United States) Victor Amaya / (United States) Brian Gottfried (second round)
6. (Australia) David Graham / (Australia) Laurie Warder (second round)
7. (South Africa) Bernard Mitton / (United States) Butch Walts (champions)
8. (United States) Eric Fromm / (United States) Eliot Teltscher (second round)

== Draw ==
Key

- Q = Qualifier
- WC = Wild card
- LL = Lucky loser
- Alt = Alternate
- ITF = ITF entry
- PR = Protected ranking
- SR = Special ranking
- SE = Special exempt
- JE = Junior exempt
- JR = Junior Accelerator Programme entrant
- CO = College Accelerator Programme entrant
- NG = Next Gen Accelerator Program entrant
- w/o = Walkover
- r = Retired
- d = Defaulted

=== Finals ===
Semifinals
(United States) Mike Leach (United States) Jeff Turpin	3	3
4	(United States) Scott Davis (United States) Ferdi Taygan	6	6
(United States) Martin Davis (United States) C Dunk	5	4
7	(South Africa) Bernard Mitton (United States) Butch Walts	7	6

Final
4	(United States) Scott Davis (United States) Ferdi Taygan	7	3	2
7	(South Africa) Bernard Mitton (United States) Butch Walts	5	6	6

=== Top half ===
First round
(Puerto Rico) E Fernández (United States) D Pate	6	6	7
(United States) M De Palmer (United States) H Pfister	3	7	6
(United States) M Leach (United States) J Turpin	4	7	6
(Israel) S Glickstein (United States) P Rennert	6	5	4
(United States) J Mattke (United States) S McCain	1	3
8	(United States) E Fromm (United States) E Teltscher	6	6
(United States) L Stefanki (United States) R Van't Hof	6	6
(Chile) J Fillol (South Africa) R Moore	3	1
(United States) R Lutz (United States) S Smith	6	6
(Sweden) D Palm (Chile) B Prajoux	6	2
(India) A Amritraj (United States) L Bourne	6	6	4
6	(Australia) D Graham (Australia) L Warder	1	7	6

Second round
1	(United States) T Gullikson (United States) S Stewart	4	7	5
(Puerto Rico) E Fernández (United States) D Pate	6	6	7
(United States) M Leach (United States) J Turpin	6	6	7
8	(United States) E Fromm (United States) E Teltscher	3	7	6
4	(United States) S Davis (United States) F Taygan	6	6
(United States) L Stefanki (United States) R Van't Hof	3	3
(United States) R Lutz (United States) S Smith	1	7	7
6	(Australia) D Graham (Australia) L Warder	6	6	6

Quarterfinals
(Puerto Rico) E Fernández (United States) D Pate	6	6
(United States) M Leach (United States) J Turpin	7	7
4	(United States) S Davis (United States) F Taygan	6	6
(United States) R Lutz (United States) S Smith	2	4

Semifinals
(United States) M Leach (United States) J Turpin	3	3
4	(United States) S Davis (United States) F Taygan	6	6

=== Bottom half ===
First round
5	(United States) V Amaya (United States) B Gottfried	3	6	6
(United States) G Donnelly (United Kingdom) J Lloyd	6	3	4
(United States) M Davis (United States) C Dunk	6	7
(United States) V Gerulaitis (United States) M Mitchell	3	6
(United States) M Bauer (United States) K Flach	6	6
(Canada) R Bengtson (Australia) A Emerson	3	2
7	(South Africa) B Mitton (United States) B Walts	6	4	6
(Italy) G Ocleppo (Italy) C Panatta	2	6	4
(United States) T Giammalva (United States) D Gitlin	7	6
(United States) R Crowley (United States) R Evett	6	0
(South Africa) E Edwards (South Africa) D Visser	6	7
(United States) B Manson (United States) E Sherbeck	3	6

Second round
5	(United States) V Amaya (United States) B Gottfried	6	4
(United States) M Davis (United States) C Dunk	7	6
(United States) M Bauer (United States) K Flach	6	6	5
3	(United States) S Meister (United States) B Teacher	4	7	7
7	(South Africa) B Mitton (United States) B Walts	7	6	7
(United States) T Giammalva (United States) D Gitlin	5	7	5
(South Africa) E Edwards (South Africa) D Visser	7	7
2	(United States) M Dickson (Brazil) C Motta	6	6

Quarterfinals
(United States) M Davis (United States) C Dunk	4	6	7
3	(United States) S Meister (United States) B Teacher	6	4	6
7	(South Africa) B Mitton (United States) B Walts	7	7
(South Africa) E Edwards (South Africa) D Visser	6	6

Semifinals
(United States) M Davis (United States) C Dunk	5	4
7	(South Africa) B Mitton (United States) B Walts	7	6
