= 1986 Transamerica Open – Singles =

Singles
- 1986 Transamerica Open

Final
- Champion: (United States) John McEnroe
- Runner-up: (United States) Jimmy Connors
- Score: 7–6^{(8–6)}, 6–3

Details
- Draw: 32 (3WC/4Q)
- Seeds: 8

Events
Singles	Doubles
← 1985 ·	Pacific Coast Championships	· 1987 →

Stefan Edberg was the defending champion, but lost in the semifinals to John McEnroe.

McEnroe won the title by defeating Jimmy Connors 7–6^{(8–6)}, 6–3 in the final.

== Seeds ==
1. (Sweden) Stefan Edberg (semifinals)
2. (United States) Jimmy Connors (final)
3. (Sweden) Anders Järryd (semifinals, retired)
4. (United States) John McEnroe (champion)
5. (United States) Matt Anger (first round)
6. (United States) David Pate (quarterfinals)
7. (India) Ramesh Krishnan (second round)
8. (South Africa) Christo Steyn (second round)

== Draw ==
=== Key ===
- Q = Qualifier
- WC = Wild card
- LL = Lucky loser
- Alt = Alternate
- SE = Special exempt
- PR = Protected ranking
- ITF = ITF entry
- JE = Junior exempt
- w/o = Walkover
- r = Retired
- d = Defaulted
- SR = Special ranking

=== Finals ===
Semifinals
1	(Sweden) Stefan Edberg	6	2
4	(United States) John McEnroe	7	6
3	(Sweden) Anders Järryd	7	1	0^{r}
2	(United States) Jimmy Connors	6	6	2

Final
4	(United States) John McEnroe	7^{8}	6
2	(United States) Jimmy Connors	6^{6}	3

=== Top half ===
First round
1	(Sweden) S Edberg	6	3	6
(Mexico) L Lavalle	3	6	3
(United States) B Schultz	7	6
(South Africa) C van Rensburg	6	4
Q	(United States) J Pugh	1	4
Q	(United States) J Grabb	6	6
(United States) B Green	7	6	6
8	(South Africa) C Steyn	6	7	7
4	(United States) J McEnroe	6	6
(Australia) B Dyke	2	2
(United States) B Scanlon	4	2
Q	(United States) J Letts	6	6
Q	(Peru) J Yzaga	7	3	6
(India) V Amritraj	6	6	4
(United States) J Sadri	6	6
5	(United States) M Anger	4	4

Second round
1	(Sweden) S Edberg	6	6
(United States) B Schultz	3	2
Q	(United States) J Grabb	6	6
8	(South Africa) C Steyn	4	4
4	(United States) J McEnroe	6	6
Q	(United States) J Letts	2	2
Q	(Peru) J Yzaga	5	6	0
(United States) J Sadri	7	3	6

Quarterfinals
1	(Sweden) S Edberg	7	6
Q	(United States) J Grabb	6	4
4	(United States) J McEnroe	6	6
(United States) J Sadri	1	4

Semifinals
1	(Sweden) S Edberg	6	2
4	(United States) J McEnroe	7	6

=== Bottom half ===
First round
6	(United States) D Pate	6	6
(Canada) G Michibata	3	4
(Nigeria) N Odizor	6	4	4
(United States) M Leach	4	6	6
(United States) M Davis	3	4
(United States) T Nelson	6	6
(United States) T Witsken	1	2
3	(Sweden) A Järryd	6	6
7	(India) R Krishnan	6	6
WC	(United States) S DeVries	2	0
(Sweden) P Lundgren	7	6
(South Africa) E Edwards	5	4
(United States) G Holmes	2	4
WC	(United States) P Fleming	6	6
WC	(United States) D Goldie	1	6
2	(United States) J Connors	6	7

Second round
6	(United States) D Pate	6	7
(United States) M Leach	2	6
(United States) T Nelson	3	4
3	(Sweden) A Järryd	6	6
7	(India) R Krishnan	4	1
(Sweden) P Lundgren	6	6
WC	(United States) P Fleming	3	6	3
2	(United States) J Connors	6	3	6

Quarterfinals
6	(United States) D Pate	5	2
3	(Sweden) A Järryd	7	6
(Sweden) P Lundgren	3	4
2	(United States) J Connors	6	6

Semifinals
3	(Sweden) A Järryd	7	1	0^{r}
2	(United States) J Connors	6	6	2
