= 1987 Pilot Pen Classic – Doubles =

Doubles
- 1987 Pilot Pen Classic

Final
- Champions: (France) Guy Forget (France) Yannick Noah
- Runners-up: (West Germany) Boris Becker (West Germany) Eric Jelen
- Score: 6–4, 7–6

Details
- Draw: 28
- Seeds: 8

Events
Singles	Doubles
- Pilot Pen Classic

Peter Fleming and Guy Forget were the defending champions but only Forget competed that year with Yannick Noah.

Forget and Noah won in the final 6–4, 7–6 against Boris Becker and Eric Jelen.

== Seeds ==
The top four seeded teams received byes into the second round.

1. (France) Guy Forget / (France) Yannick Noah (champions)
2. (Sweden) Joakim Nyström / (Sweden) Mats Wilander (second round)
3. (Spain) Sergio Casal / (Spain) Emilio Sánchez (semifinals)
4. (United States) Paul Annacone / (South Africa) Christo van Rensburg (semifinals)
5. (South Africa) Christo Steyn / (South Africa) Danie Visser (second round)
6. (Australia) Peter Doohan / (Australia) Laurie Warder (second round)
7. (United States) Sherwood Stewart / (Australia) Kim Warwick (quarterfinals)
8. (Czechoslovakia) Miloslav Mečíř / (Czechoslovakia) Tomáš Šmíd (quarterfinals)

== Draw ==
Key

- Q = Qualifier
- WC = Wild card
- LL = Lucky loser
- Alt = Alternate
- ITF = ITF entry
- PR = Protected ranking
- SR = Special ranking
- SE = Special exempt
- JE = Junior exempt
- JR = Junior Accelerator Programme entrant
- CO = College Accelerator Programme entrant
- NG = Next Gen Accelerator Program entrant
- w/o = Walkover
- r = Retired
- d = Defaulted

=== Finals ===
Semifinals
1	(France) Guy Forget (France) Yannick Noah	6	6
3	(Spain) Sergio Casal (Spain) Emilio Sánchez	2	4
4	(United States) Paul Annacone (South Africa) Christo van Rensburg	4	4
(West Germany) Boris Becker (West Germany) Eric Jelen	6	6

Final
1	(France) Guy Forget (France) Yannick Noah	6	7
(West Germany) Boris Becker (West Germany) Eric Jelen	4	6

=== Top half ===
First round
(United States) J Kriek (United Kingdom) J Lloyd	6	6	6
(Australia) R Emerson (Australia) D Tyson	4	7	3
(Sweden) P Lundgren (Sweden) J Windahl	5	7	3
(South Africa) E Edwards (United States) M Freeman	7	6	6
(United States) T Wilkison (Socialist Federal Republic of Yugoslavia) S Živojinović	4	4
7	(United States) S Stewart (Australia) K Warwick	6	6
(United States) K Curren (Switzerland) J Hlasek	6	5	6
(Israel) G Bloom (United States) L Scott	3	7	2
(United States) M Anger (United States) J Arias	7	5	4
(Brazil) L Mattar (Brazil) C Motta	5	7	6
(West Germany) T Meinecke (Italy) C Panatta	6	4
5	(South Africa) C Steyn (South Africa) D Visser	7	6

Second round
1	(France) G Forget (France) Y Noah	2	7	6
(United States) J Kriek (United Kingdom) J Lloyd	6	5	3
(South Africa) E Edwards (United States) M Freeman	6	4	4
7	(United States) S Stewart (Australia) K Warwick	4	6	6
3	(Spain) S Casal (Spain) E Sánchez	6	6
(United States) K Curren (Switzerland) J Hlasek	2	3
(Brazil) L Mattar (Brazil) C Motta	7	6
5	(South Africa) C Steyn (South Africa) D Visser	6	4

Quarterfinals
1	(France) G Forget (France) Y Noah	7	6
7	(United States) S Stewart (Australia) K Warwick	5	4
3	(Spain) S Casal (Spain) E Sánchez	6	6	6
(Brazil) L Mattar (Brazil) C Motta	7	2	4

Semifinals
1	(France) G Forget (France) Y Noah	6	6
3	(Spain) S Casal (Spain) E Sánchez	2	4

=== Bottom half ===
First round
6	(Australia) P Doohan (Australia) L Warder	7	6
(United States) G Donnelly (France) H Leconte	6	4
(United States) S Davis (United States) D Pate	6	6
(United States) K Jones (United States) B Pearce	0	3
(Iran) M Bahrami (Uruguay) D Pérez	7	6
(Australia) D Cahill (Australia) C Limberger	6	4
8	(Czechoslovakia) M Mečíř (Czechoslovakia) T Šmíd	6	6
(United States) L Stefanki (United States) R Van't Hof	4	4
(West Germany) B Becker (West Germany) E Jelen	6	6
(United States) V Van Patten (United States) T Witsken	3	4
(Italy) P Canè (Italy) S Colombo	4	6
(Netherlands) M Schapers (Czechoslovakia) M Šrejber	6	7

Second round
6	(Australia) P Doohan (Australia) L Warder	6	3	3
(United States) S Davis (United States) D Pate	3	6	6
(Iran) M Bahrami (Uruguay) D Pérez	2	3
4	(United States) P Annacone (South Africa) C van Rensburg	6	6
8	(Czechoslovakia) M Mečíř (Czechoslovakia) T Šmíd	4	2
(West Germany) B Becker (West Germany) E Jelen	6	6
(Netherlands) M Schapers (Czechoslovakia) M Šrejber	1	6	0
2	(Sweden) J Nyström (Sweden) M Wilander	6	4	6

Quarterfinals
(United States) S Davis (United States) D Pate	3	4
4	(United States) P Annacone (South Africa) C van Rensburg	6	6
(West Germany) B Becker (West Germany) E Jelen	5	7	7
2	(Sweden) J Nyström (Sweden) M Wilander	7	6	5

Semifinals
4	(United States) P Annacone (South Africa) C van Rensburg	4	4
(West Germany) B Becker (West Germany) E Jelen	6	6
