= 1985 Pilot Pen Classic – Singles =

Singles
- 1985 Pilot Pen Classic

Final
- Champion: (United States) Larry Stefanki
- Runner-up: (United States) David Pate
- Score: 6–1, 6–4, 3–6, 6–3

Details
- Draw: 56
- Seeds: 16

Events
Singles	Doubles
- Pilot Pen Classic

Jimmy Connors was the defending champion but lost in the quarterfinals to Greg Holmes.

Larry Stefanki won in the final 6–1, 6–4, 3–6, 6–3 against David Pate.

== Seeds ==
The top eight seeds received a bye into the second round.

1. (United States) Jimmy Connors (quarterfinals)
2. (Sweden) Henrik Sundström (second round)
3. (United States) Aaron Krickstein (quarterfinals)
4. (United States) Johan Kriek (second round)
5. (Sweden) Joakim Nyström (second round)
6. (Czechoslovakia) Tomáš Šmíd (third round)
7. (Spain) Juan Aguilera (second round)
8. (Spain) José Higueras (third round)
9. (Czechoslovakia) Libor Pimek (semifinals)
10. (United States) Brad Gilbert (third round)
11. (Argentina) Guillermo Vilas (first round)
12. (United States) Scott Davis (third round)
13. (Australia) John Fitzgerald (first round)
14. (United States) Greg Holmes (semifinals)
15. (United States) Terry Moor (first round)
16. (France) Guy Forget (first round)

== Draw ==
Key

- Q = Qualifier
- WC = Wild card
- LL = Lucky loser
- Alt = Alternate
- ITF = ITF entry
- PR = Protected ranking
- SR = Special ranking
- SE = Special exempt
- JE = Junior exempt
- JR = Junior Accelerator Programme entrant
- CO = College Accelerator Programme entrant
- NG = Next Gen Accelerator Program entrant
- w/o = Walkover
- r = Retired
- d = Defaulted

=== Finals ===
Semifinals
14	(United States) Greg Holmes	2	6	3
WC	(United States) Larry Stefanki	6	4	6
(United States) David Pate	7	6
9	(Czechoslovakia) Libor Pimek	6	4

Final
WC	(United States) Larry Stefanki	6	6	3	6
(United States) David Pate	1	4	6	3

=== Top half ===
==== Section 1 ====
First round
(Peru) P Arraya	4	3
Q	(Socialist Federal Republic of Yugoslavia) S Živojinović	6	6
Q	(South Africa) B Moir	0	6	7
(United States) B Willenborg	6	4	6
(Czechoslovakia) P Složil	6	3	2
10	(United States) B Gilbert	2	6	6
14	(United States) G Holmes	6	6
(South Africa) D Visser	3	3
(United States) J Lapidus	4	4
(West Germany) M Westphal	6	6
(Israel) S Glickstein	4	2
Q	(United States) T Nelson	6	6

Second round
1	(United States) J Connors	6	6	7
Q	(Socialist Federal Republic of Yugoslavia) S Živojinović	2	7	6
Q	(South Africa) B Moir	2	2
10	(United States) B Gilbert	6	6
14	(United States) G Holmes	6	6
(West Germany) M Westphal	2	2
Q	(United States) T Nelson	4	2
6	(Czechoslovakia) T Šmíd	6	6

Third round
1	(United States) J Connors	6	6
10	(United States) B Gilbert	4	2
14	(United States) G Holmes	7	6
6	(Czechoslovakia) T Šmíd	5	1

Quarterfinals
1	(United States) J Connors	0	3
14	(United States) G Holmes	6	6

==== Section 2 ====
First round
WC	(United States) D Goldie	3	6
(France) T Benhabiles	6	7
Q	(New Zealand) R Simpson	7	6
(United States) M Bauer	6	2
(France) T Tulasne	7	4	7
16	(France) G Forget	6	6	6
12	(United States) S Davis	6	6
WC	(United States) S Smith	4	2
Q	(Socialist Federal Republic of Yugoslavia) M Ostoja	1	6
WC	(United States) R Leach	6	7
Q	(United States) K Belcher	2	3
WC	(United States) L Stefanki	6	6

Second round
4	(United States) J Kriek	1	5
(France) T Benhabiles	6	7
Q	(New Zealand) R Simpson	6	7	6
(France) T Tulasne	7	6	1
12	(United States) S Davis	3	6	6
WC	(United States) R Leach	6	3	2
WC	(United States) L Stefanki	7	2	7
7	(Spain) J Aguilera	6	6	5

Third round
(France) T Benhabiles	6	6
Q	(New Zealand) R Simpson	2	3
12	(United States) S Davis	1	4
WC	(United States) L Stefanki	6	6

Quarterfinals
(France) T Benhabiles	5	6
WC	(United States) L Stefanki	7	7

=== Bottom half ===
==== Section 3 ====
First round
(Australia) J Frawley	6	6	4
(United States) D Pate	7	4	6
(France) H Leconte	6	6
(Switzerland) H Günthardt	1	4
(United States) H Pfister	6	3	6
13	(Australia) J Fitzgerald	4	6	4
11	(Argentina) G Vilas	7	4	4
(West Germany) H Schwaier	6	6	6
(Israel) S Perkiss	6	7
(Uruguay) D Pérez	2	6
(Australia) P Doohan	4	6	4
(Sweden) J Gunnarsson	6	3	6

Second round
5	(Sweden) J Nyström	6	3	4
(United States) D Pate	1	6	6
(France) H Leconte	7	6	6
(United States) H Pfister	6	7	7
(West Germany) H Schwaier	1	7	6
(Israel) S Perkiss	6	6	7
(Sweden) J Gunnarsson	4	1
3	(United States) A Krickstein	6	6

Third round
(United States) D Pate	2	7	6
(United States) H Pfister	6	6	4
(Israel) S Perkiss	3	4
3	(United States) A Krickstein	6	6

Quarterfinals
(United States) D Pate	6	2	6
3	(United States) A Krickstein	2	6	1

==== Section 4 ====
First round
(United States) M Mitchell	6	6
(Hungary) B Taróczy	2	3
(United States) M Davis	6	3
WC	(United States) R Lutz	7	6
(Paraguay) V Pecci	4	4
9	(Czechoslovakia) L Pimek	6	6
15	(United States) T Moor	4	6
Q	(United States) R Seguso	6	7
(United States) D Cassidy	1	6	6
(United Kingdom) J Lloyd	6	3	7
(United States) B Testerman	7	2	6
(United States) T Wilkison	5	6	2

Second round
8	(Spain) J Higueras	7	6
(United States) M Mitchell	5	2
WC	(United States) R Lutz	1	2
9	(Czechoslovakia) L Pimek	6	6
Q	(United States) R Seguso	6	1	6
(United Kingdom) J Lloyd	4	6	7
(United States) B Testerman	7	6
2	(Sweden) H Sundström	5	3

Third round
8	(Spain) J Higueras	4	4
9	(Czechoslovakia) L Pimek	6	6
(United Kingdom) J Lloyd	6	6
(United States) B Testerman	4	0

Quarterfinals
9	(Czechoslovakia) L Pimek	6	1	6
(United Kingdom) J Lloyd	1	6	4
