= 1985 Pilot Pen Classic – Doubles =

Doubles
- 1985 Pilot Pen Classic

Final
- Champions: (Switzerland) Heinz Günthardt (Hungary) Balázs Taróczy
- Runners-up: (United States) Ken Flach (United States) Robert Seguso
- Score: 3–6, 7–6, 6–3

Details
- Draw: 28
- Seeds: 8

Events
| Singles | Doubles |
- Pilot Pen Classic

Bernard Mitton and Butch Walts were the defending champions but only Walts competed that year with Gary Donnelly.

Donnelly and Walts lost in the second round to Jan Gunnarsson and Michael Mortensen.

Heinz Günthardt and Balázs Taróczy won in the final 3–6, 7–6, 6–3 against Ken Flach and Robert Seguso.

== Seeds ==
The top four seeded teams received byes into the second round.

1. (Czechoslovakia) Pavel Složil / (Czechoslovakia) Tomáš Šmíd (semifinals)
2. (France) Henri Leconte / (United States) Sandy Mayer (semifinals)
3. (Switzerland) Heinz Günthardt / (Hungary) Balázs Taróczy (champions)
4. (United States) Ken Flach / (United States) Robert Seguso (final)
5. (United States) Sherwood Stewart / (Australia) Kim Warwick (quarterfinals)
6. (Australia) Broderick Dyke / (Australia) John Fitzgerald (second round)
7. (United States) Fritz Buehning / (United States) Ferdi Taygan (first round)
8. (Sweden) Jan Gunnarsson / (Denmark) Michael Mortensen (quarterfinals)

== Draw ==
Key

- Q = Qualifier
- WC = Wild card
- LL = Lucky loser
- Alt = Alternate
- ITF = ITF entry
- PR = Protected ranking
- SR = Special ranking
- SE = Special exempt
- JE = Junior exempt
- JR = Junior Accelerator Programme entrant
- CO = College Accelerator Programme entrant
- NG = Next Gen Accelerator Program entrant
- w/o = Walkover
- r = Retired
- d = Defaulted

=== Finals ===
Semifinals
1 | (Czechoslovakia) Pavel Složil (Czechoslovakia) Tomáš Šmíd | 4 | 4
3 | (Switzerland) Heinz Günthardt (Hungary) Balázs Taróczy | 6 | 6
4 | (United States) Ken Flach (United States) Robert Seguso | 7 | 6
2 | (France) Henri Leconte (United States) Sandy Mayer | 6 | 4

Final
3 | (Switzerland) Heinz Günthardt (Hungary) Balázs Taróczy | 3 | 7 | 6
4 | (United States) Ken Flach (United States) Robert Seguso | 6 | 6 | 3

=== Top half ===
First round
(United States) D Gitlin (United States) B Willenborg | 3 | 7 | 6
(United States) C B Cox (United States) M Flur | 6 | 6 | 2
(United States) T Moor (United States) J Turpin | 6 | 7 | 4
(United States) G Holmes (United States) A Krickstein | 7 | 5 | 6
(United States) M Riessen (United States) D Stockton | 4 | 6 | 4
6 | (Australia) B Dyke (Australia) J Fitzgerald | 6 | 3 | 6
(United States) D Cassidy (United States) T Wilkison | 4 | 7 | 6
(South Africa) E Edwards (South Africa) D Visser | 6 | 6 | 1
(Spain) E Sánchez (Sweden) H Sundström | 3 | 2
(United States) G Donnelly (United States) B Walts | 6 | 6
(United States) M Bauer (United States) H Pfister | 4 | 3
8 | (Sweden) J Gunnarsson (Denmark) M Mortensen | 6 | 6

Second round
1 | (Czechoslovakia) P Složil (Czechoslovakia) T Šmíd | 6 | 7
(United States) D Gitlin (United States) B Willenborg | 1 | 5
(United States) G Holmes (United States) A Krickstein | 6 | 4 | 7
6 | (Australia) B Dyke (Australia) J Fitzgerald | 3 | 6 | 5
3 | (Switzerland) H Günthardt (Hungary) B Taróczy | 6 | 6
(United States) D Cassidy (United States) T Wilkison | 4 | 3
(United States) G Donnelly (United States) B Walts | 3 | 6 | 5
8 | (Sweden) J Gunnarsson (Denmark) M Mortensen | 6 | 4 | 7

Quarterfinals
1 | (Czechoslovakia) P Složil (Czechoslovakia) T Šmíd | 6 | 6
(United States) G Holmes (United States) A Krickstein | 4 | 4
3 | (Switzerland) H Günthardt (Hungary) B Taróczy | 6 | 6 | 6
8 | (Sweden) J Gunnarsson (Denmark) M Mortensen | 7 | 3 | 4

Semifinals
1 | (Czechoslovakia) P Složil (Czechoslovakia) T Šmíd | 4 | 4
3 | (Switzerland) H Günthardt (Hungary) B Taróczy | 6 | 6

=== Bottom half ===
First round
5 | (United States) S Stewart (Australia) K Warwick | 7 | 6
(Australia) J Frawley (Australia) P McNamee | 5 | 3
(United States) S Davis (United States) B Testerman | 7 | 6
(United States) M Davis (United States) T Delatte | 6 | 2
(Australia) D Graham (United States) D Pate | 6 | 6
(United States) L Stefanki (United States) R Van't Hof | 4 | 4
7 | (United States) F Buehning (United States) F Taygan | 3 | 7 | 6
(New Zealand) R Simpson (South Africa) C van Rensburg | 6 | 6 | 7
(United Kingdom) J Lloyd (United States) M Mitchell | 6 | 3 | 6
(United States) J Kriek (United States) S McCain | 3 | 6 | 3
(United States) R Leach (United States) T Pawsat | 6 | 4
(United States) B Manson (United States) S Smith | 7 | 6

Second round
5 | (United States) S Stewart (Australia) K Warwick | 7 | 6
(United States) S Davis (United States) B Testerman | 5 | 3
(Australia) D Graham (United States) D Pate | 0 | 7 | 4
4 | (United States) K Flach (United States) R Seguso | 6 | 6 | 6
(New Zealand) R Simpson (South Africa) C van Rensburg | 2 | 2
(United Kingdom) J Lloyd (United States) M Mitchell | 6 | 6
(United States) B Manson (United States) S Smith | 6 | 2
2 | (France) H Leconte (United States) S Mayer | 7 | 6

Quarterfinals
5 | (United States) S Stewart (Australia) K Warwick | 6 | 5
4 | (United States) K Flach (United States) R Seguso | 7 | 7
(United Kingdom) J Lloyd (United States) M Mitchell | 1 | 2
2 | (France) H Leconte (United States) S Mayer | 6 | 6

Semifinals
4 | (United States) K Flach (United States) R Seguso | 7 | 6
2 | (France) H Leconte (United States) S Mayer | 6 | 4
