= 1987 Pilot Pen Classic – Singles =

Singles
- 1987 Pilot Pen Classic

Final
- Champion: (West Germany) Boris Becker
- Runner-up: (Sweden) Stefan Edberg
- Score: 6–4, 6–4, 7–5

Details
- Draw: 56
- Seeds: 16

Events
Singles	Doubles
- Pilot Pen Classic

Joakim Nyström was the defending champion but lost in the third round to Jakob Hlasek.

Boris Becker won in the final 6–4, 6–4, 7–5 against Stefan Edberg.

== Seeds ==
The top eight seeds received a bye into the second round.

1. (Sweden) Stefan Edberg (final)
2. (West Germany) Boris Becker (champion)
3. (France) Yannick Noah (semifinals)
4. (Sweden) Mats Wilander (semifinals)
5. (France) Henri Leconte (third round)
6. (Sweden) Joakim Nyström (third round)
7. (Czechoslovakia) Miloslav Mečíř (quarterfinals)
8. (Sweden) Mikael Pernfors (third round)
9. (Sweden) Kent Carlsson (third round, retired)
10. (Spain) Emilio Sánchez (quarterfinals)
11. (Argentina) Martín Jaite (first round)
12. (France) Thierry Tulasne (quarterfinals)
13. (Sweden) Jonas Svensson (first round)
14. (United States) Kevin Curren (first round)
15. (United States) Aaron Krickstein (first round)
16. (France) Guy Forget (first round)

== Draw ==
Key

- Q = Qualifier
- WC = Wild card
- LL = Lucky loser
- Alt = Alternate
- ITF = ITF entry
- PR = Protected ranking
- SR = Special ranking
- SE = Special exempt
- JE = Junior exempt
- JR = Junior Accelerator Programme entrant
- CO = College Accelerator Programme entrant
- NG = Next Gen Accelerator Program entrant
- w/o = Walkover
- r = Retired
- d = Defaulted

=== Finals ===
Semifinals
1	(Sweden) Stefan Edberg	6	7
4	(Sweden) Mats Wilander	1	5
3	(France) Yannick Noah	4	2
2	(West Germany) Boris Becker	6	6

Final
1	(Sweden) Stefan Edberg	4	4	5
2	(West Germany) Boris Becker	6	6	7

=== Top half ===
==== Section 1 ====
First round
(Peru) P Arraya	6	6
(India) R Krishnan	3	3
(Mexico) F Maciel	0	5
(United States) T Witsken	6	7
(United States) J Arias	3	6	7
16	(France) G Forget	6	3	5
9	(Sweden) K Carlsson	7	6
(United States) G Donnelly	6	3
(United States) M Freeman	2	2
Q	(South Africa) C van Rensburg	6	6
Q	(United States) J Grabb	1	4
(Italy) P Canè	6	6

Second round
1	(Sweden) S Edberg	6	6
(Peru) P Arraya	3	3
(United States) T Witsken	6	6
(United States) J Arias	4	3
9	(Sweden) K Carlsson	6	2	6
Q	(South Africa) C van Rensburg	2	6	4
(Italy) P Canè	6	3	4
7	(Czechoslovakia) M Mečíř	3	6	6

Third round
1	(Sweden) S Edberg	7	6
(United States) T Witsken	5	4
9	(Sweden) K Carlsson	6	2^{r}
7	(Czechoslovakia) M Mečíř	7	3

Quarterfinals
1	(Sweden) S Edberg	4	6	6
7	(Czechoslovakia) M Mečíř	6	4	2

==== Section 2 ====
First round
(Czechoslovakia) T Šmíd	7	2	3
(Spain) S Casal	6	6	6
(United States) J Kriek	6	3	2
Q	(United States) D Goldie	3	6	6
(Czechoslovakia) M Šrejber	7	7
14	(United States) K Curren	6	6
11	(Argentina) M Jaite	7	2	4
(Switzerland) J Hlasek	6	6	6
(Uruguay) D Pérez	6	6
(Israel) A Mansdorf	2	4
(Brazil) C Motta	7	4	1
(United States) M Anger	6	6	6

Second round
4	(Sweden) M Wilander	6	6
(Spain) S Casal	3	0
Q	(United States) D Goldie	0	4
(Czechoslovakia) M Šrejber	6	6
(Switzerland) J Hlasek	6	6
(Uruguay) D Pérez	3	3
(United States) M Anger	2	5
6	(Sweden) J Nyström	6	7

Third round
4	(Sweden) M Wilander	3	6	6
(Czechoslovakia) M Šrejber	6	0	4
(Switzerland) J Hlasek	6	6
6	(Sweden) J Nyström	4	4

Quarterfinals
4	(Sweden) M Wilander	6	6
(Switzerland) J Hlasek	3	0

=== Bottom half ===
==== Section 3 ====
First round
(United States) J Canter	3	6	7
Q	(South Africa) D Visser	6	4	6
(Soviet Union) A Chesnokov	6	3	3
(West Germany) E Jelen	3	6	6
Q	(South Africa) B Moir	2	3
12	(France) T Tulasne	6	6
13	(Sweden) J Svensson	4	3
(France) T Benhabiles	6	6
(Socialist Federal Republic of Yugoslavia) S Živojinović	6	6	4
WC	(United States) L Stefanki	7	2	6
(United States) D Pate	6	5	6
(South Africa) E Edwards	2	7	4

Second round
5	(France) H Leconte	6	6	6
(United States) J Canter	7	1	4
(West Germany) E Jelen	2	0
12	(France) T Tulasne	6	6
(France) T Benhabiles	6	6
WC	(United States) L Stefanki	2	3
(United States) D Pate	6	2	3
3	(France) Y Noah	3	6	6

Third round
5	(France) H Leconte	6	6	3
12	(France) T Tulasne	7	4	6
(France) T Benhabiles	3	4
3	(France) Y Noah	6	6

Quarterfinals
12	(France) T Tulasne	0	6	4
3	(France) Y Noah	6	3	6

==== Section 4 ====
First round
WC	(United States) R Leach	2	3
(Sweden) U Stenlund	6	6
Q	(Sweden) J Carlsson	4	2
(Czechoslovakia) K Nováček	6	6
(United States) E Teltscher	6	6	1
10	(Spain) E Sánchez	1	7	6
15	(United States) A Krickstein	6	4	6
(United States) S Davis	4	6	7
(Austria) H Skoff	4	4
Q	(South Africa) G Muller	6	6
WC	(Canada) A Sznajder	2	0
(United States) T Wilkison	6	6

Second round
8	(Sweden) M Pernfors	6	6	6
(Sweden) U Stenlund	4	7	2
(Czechoslovakia) K Nováček	6	2	3
10	(Spain) E Sánchez	3	6	6
(United States) S Davis	6	6
Q	(South Africa) G Muller	4	0
(United States) T Wilkison	5	4
2	(West Germany) B Becker	7	6

Third round
8	(Sweden) M Pernfors	6	0
10	(Spain) E Sánchez	7	6
(United States) S Davis	1	2
2	(West Germany) B Becker	6	6

Quarterfinals
10	(Spain) E Sánchez	3	5
2	(West Germany) B Becker	6	7
