= 1984 Congoleum Classic =

- Date: February 13–19
- Edition: 11th
- Category: Grand Prix (Super Series)
- Draw: 56S / 28D
- Prize money: $200,000
- Surface: Hard / outdoor
- Location: La Quinta, California, U.S.
- Venue: La Quinta Resort and Club

Champions

Singles
- (United States) Jimmy Connors

Doubles
- (South Africa) Bernard Mitton / (United States) Butch Walts
← 1983 ·	Indian Wells Masters	· 1985 →

The 1984 Congoleum Classic was a men's tennis tournament played on outdoor hard courts. It was the 11th edition of the tournament and was part of the Super Series of the 1984 Volvo Grand Prix circuit. It was played at the La Quinta Resort and Club in La Quinta, California in the United States and took place from February 13 through February 19, 1984. First-seeded Jimmy Connors won the singles title.

== Finals ==
=== Singles ===
(United States) Jimmy Connors defeated (France) Yannick Noah 6–2, 6–7, 6–3

- It was Connors' 2nd singles title of the year and the 102nd of his career.

=== Doubles ===
(South Africa) Bernard Mitton / (United States) Butch Walts defeated (United States) Scott Davis / (United States) Ferdi Taygan 5–7, 6–3, 6–2

- It was Mitton's only title of the year and the 11th of his career. It was Walts' 1st title of the year and the 18th of his career.
