= 1985 Transamerica Open =

- Date: September 23–29
- Edition: 97th
- Category: Grand Prix
- Draw: 32S / 16D
- Prize money: $210,000
- Surface: Carpet / indoor
- Location: San Francisco, U.S.
- Venue: Cow Palace

Champions

Singles
- (Sweden) Stefan Edberg

Doubles
- (United States) Paul Annacone / (South Africa) Christo van Rensburg
← 1984 ·	Pacific Coast Championships	· 1986 →

The 1985 Transamerica Open, also known as the Pacific Coast Championships, was a men's tennis tournament played on indoor carpet courts at the Cow Palace in San Francisco, California in the United States. The event was part of the 1985 Nabisco Grand Prix circuit. It was the 97th edition of the tournament and was held from September 23 through September 29, 1985. Third-seeded Stefan Edberg won the singles title.

== Finals ==
=== Singles ===
(Sweden) Stefan Edberg defeated (United States) Johan Kriek 6–4, 6–2

- It was Edberg's 2nd singles title of the year and the 3rd of his career.

=== Doubles ===
(United States) Paul Annacone / (South Africa) Christo van Rensburg defeated (United States) Brad Gilbert / (United States) Sandy Mayer 3–6, 6–3, 6–4
