= 1987 Pilot Pen Classic =

- Date: February 16–23
- Edition: 14th
- Category: Grand Prix
- Draw: 56S / 28D
- Prize money: $350,000
- Surface: Hard / outdoor
- Location: Indian Wells, California, U.S.

Champions

Singles
- (West Germany) Boris Becker

Doubles
- (France) Guy Forget / (France) Yannick Noah
- Indian Wells Masters

The 1987 Pilot Pen Classic was a men's tennis tournament played on outdoor hard courts. It was the 14th edition of the Indian Wells Masters and was part of the 1987 Nabisco Grand Prix. It was played at the Grand Champions Resort in Indian Wells, California in the United States from February 16 through February 23, 1987. Second-seeded Boris Becker won the singles title.

== Finals ==
=== Singles ===
(West Germany) Boris Becker defeated (Sweden) Stefan Edberg 6–4, 6–4, 7–5

- It was Becker's 1st title of the year and the 13th of his career.

=== Doubles ===
(France) Guy Forget / (France) Yannick Noah defeated (West Germany) Boris Becker / (West Germany) Eric Jelen 6–4, 7–6

- It was Forget's 2nd title of the year and the 11th of his career. It was Noah's 3rd title of the year and the 31st of his career.
