= 1986 Transamerica Open =

Man's tennis tournament

- Date: September 22–28
- Edition: 98th
- Category: Grand Prix
- Draw: 32S / 16D
- Prize money: $220,000
- Surface: Carpet / indoor
- Location: San Francisco, U.S.
- Venue: Cow Palace

Champions

Singles
- (United States) John McEnroe

Doubles
- (United States) Peter Fleming / (United States) John McEnroe
← 1985 ·	Pacific Coast Championships	· 1987 →

The 1986 Transamerica Open, also known as the Pacific Coast Championships, was a men's tennis tournament played on indoor carpet courts at the Cow Palace in San Francisco, California in the United States. The event was part of the 1986 Nabisco Grand Prix circuit. It was the 98th edition of the tournament and was held from September 22 through September 28, 1986. Fourth-seeded John McEnroe won the singles title, his fifth and last at the event after 1978, 1979, 1982, and 1984 and earned $44,000 first-prize money.

== Finals ==
=== Singles ===
(United States) John McEnroe defeated (United States) Jimmy Connors 7–6^{(8–6)}, 6–3

- It was McEnroe's 2nd singles title of the year and the 69th of his career.

=== Doubles ===
(United States) Peter Fleming / (United States) John McEnroe defeated (United States) Mike De Palmer / (United States) Gary Donnelly 6–4, 7–6^{(7–2)}

== See also ==
- Connors–McEnroe rivalry
