= Boca West Open =

The Boca West Open is a defunct men's tennis tournament that was played on the Grand Prix tennis circuit in 1984. The event was held in Boca Raton, Florida in the United States and was played on outdoor hard courts. Jimmy Connors won the singles title while Mark Edmondson and Sherwood Stewart partnered to win the doubles title.

== Finals ==
=== Singles ===
| Year | Champions | Runners-up | Score |
|---|---|---|---|
| 1984 | (United States) Jimmy Connors | (United States) Johan Kriek | 7–5, 6–4 |

=== Doubles ===
| Year | Champions | Runners-up | Score |
|---|---|---|---|
| 1984 | (Australia) Mark Edmondson (United States) Sherwood Stewart | (United States) David Dowlen (Nigeria) Nduka Odizor | 4–6, 6–1, 6–4 |
