= Phil Lehnhoff =

American tennis player

- Country (sports): United States
- Born: December 8, 1960 (age 65) Moraga, California, U.S.

Singles
- Career record: 2–5
- Highest ranking: No. 182 (July 16, 1984)

Grand Slam singles results
- Wimbledon: Q2 (1983)

Doubles
- Career record: 0–3
- Highest ranking: No. 394 (January 2, 1984)

Phil Lehnhoff (born December 8, 1960) is an American former professional tennis player.

Born in Moraga, California, Lehnhoff competed on the professional tour in the early 1980s and played college tennis for the University of California, Berkeley.

Lehnhoff had a career high singles ranking of 182 in the world and featured in the qualifying draw for the 1983 Wimbledon Championships. He made the second round of two tour events, the 1982 Quito Open and the 1984 WCT Tournament of Champions in Forest Hills.
