= Bobby Webb (tennis) =

American tennis player

- Full name: Robert Webb
- Country (sports): United States
- Born: 1953 (age 71–72)
- Plays: Right-handed

Singles
- Career record: 3–8
- Highest ranking: No. 193 (Dec 12, 1976)

Grand Slam singles results
- Wimbledon: Q1 (1978)

Bobby Webb (born 1953) is an American former professional tennis player.

A native of Atlanta, Webb played collegiate tennis for Georgia Tech, before leaving in 1973 to pursue a career on the professional tour. He achieved a ranking inside the world's top 200 and featured in qualifying for Wimbledon.
