= Ernie Fernández =

Puerto Rican tennis player

- Country (sports): Puerto Rico
- Residence: Mayagüez, Puerto Rico
- Born: 8 June 1960 (age 65); Santurce, Puerto Rico
- Height: 6 ft 3 in (1.91 m)
- Plays: Right-handed

Singles
- Career record: 8–11
- Career titles: 0
- Highest ranking: No. 183 (15 October 1984)

Grand Slam singles results
- US Open: 1R (1981)

Doubles
- Career record: 27–35
- Career titles: 0
- Highest ranking: No. 66 (30 July 1984)

Grand Slam doubles results
- Wimbledon: 1R (1985)
- US Open: 3R (1985)

Ernesto "Ernie" Fernández (born 8 June 1960) is a former professional tennis player from Puerto Rico.

== Career ==
The Puerto Rican played collegiate tennis at the Ohio State University and was the singles champion of the Big Ten Conference in 1979, 1981 and 1982, just the third player in history to be a triple winner. He was also a dual NCAA All-American, in 1980 and 1981.

In the 1981 US Open, his only appearance in the singles draw at a Grand Slam, Fernández was beaten in the first round by Gilles Moretton, but managed to take the match to a fifth set. His best performances on the Grand Prix tennis circuit included reaching the quarter-finals at Cleveland in 1981 and wins over both Mike Bauer and Vitas Gerulaitis in the 1984 Congoleum Classic.

Fernández was most prominent on the doubles tour and reached two Grand Prix finals. With Gary Donnelly, Fernández was runner-up at Forest Hills in 1984 and later that year lost another final, in Boston, partnering David Pate. He teamed up with Ricardo Acuña to reach the third round of the 1985 US Open, which was the furthest he would go in a Grand Slam.

Puerto Rico didn't start competing in the Davis Cup tennis until 1992, six years after Fernández last appeared on tour. However, in 1997, he came out of retirement and spent two years playing for the Puerto Rico Davis Cup team. He took part in five ties and played eight rubbers, of which he won three.

== Grand Prix career finals ==
=== Doubles: 2 (0–2) ===
Result	W/L	Date	Tournament	Surface	Partner	Opponents	Score
Loss	0–1	May 1984	Forest Hills, United States	Clay	(United States) David Pate	(United States) David Dowlen (Nigeria) Nduka Odizor	6–7, 5–7
Loss	0–2	Jul 1984	Boston, United States	Clay	(United States) Gary Donnelly	(United States) Ken Flach (United States) Robert Seguso	4–6, 4–6

== Challenger titles ==
=== Doubles: (1) ===
No.	Year	Tournament	Surface	Partner	Opponents	Score
1.	1984	Tunis, Tunisia	Clay	(Denmark) Michael Mortensen	(West Germany) Peter Elter (West Germany) Andreas Maurer	6–3, 6–4
