= Balázs Taróczy =

Hungarian tennis player

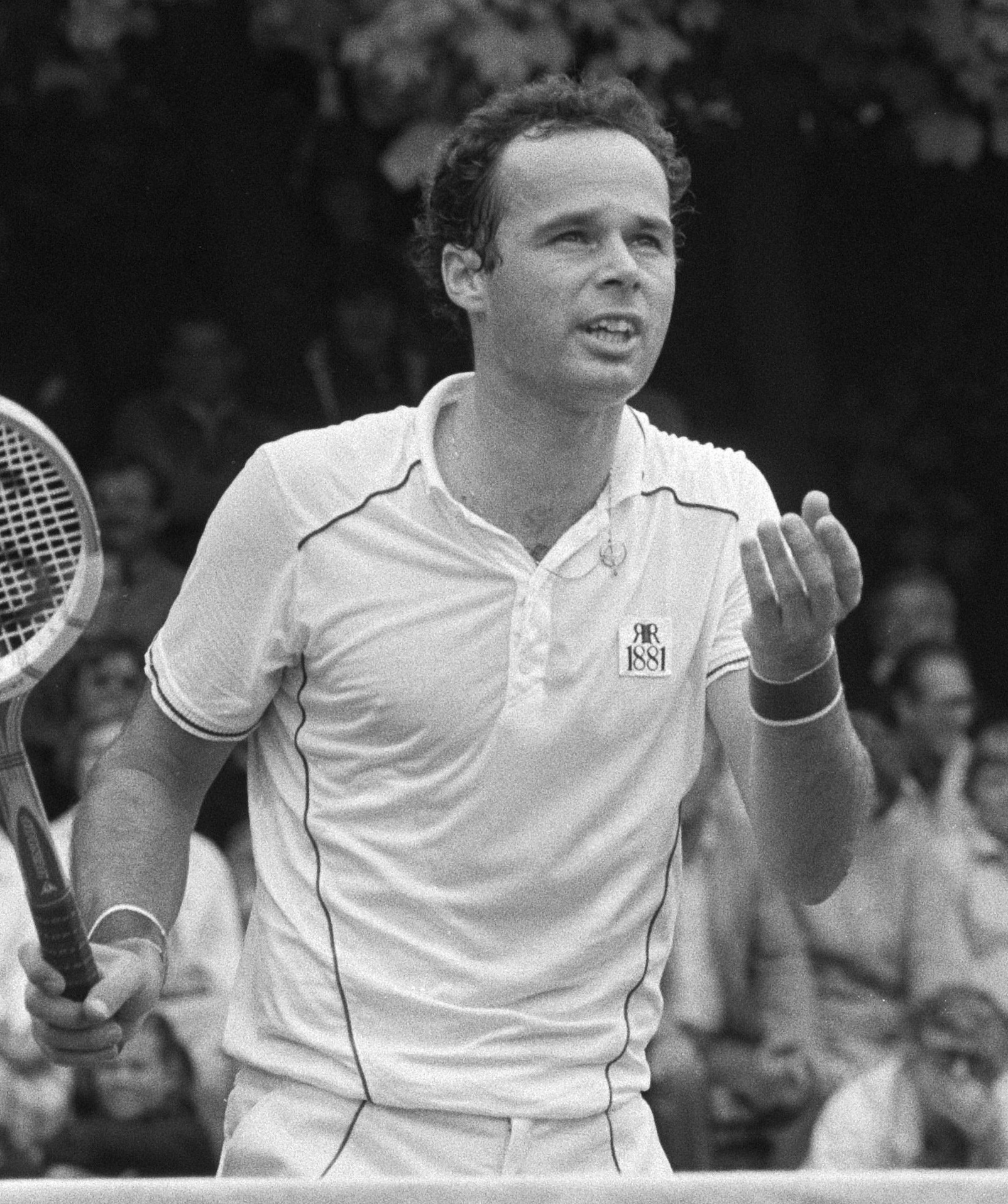
- Taróczy, 1981 in Hilversum
- Country (sports): Hungary
- Residence: Budapest
- Born: 9 May 1954 (age 72) Budapest, Hungary
- Height: 1.83 m (6 ft 0 in)
- Turned pro: 1972
- Retired: 1990
- Plays: Right-handed (one-handed backhand)
- Prize money: $1,437,443

Singles
- Career record: 391–232
- Career titles: 13
- Highest ranking: No. 12 (5 April 1982)

Grand Slam singles results
- Australian Open: 1R (1973, 1979)
- French Open: QF (1976, 1981)
- Wimbledon: 4R (1980)
- US Open: 3R (1974, 1975)

Other tournaments
- WCT Finals: 1R (1983)

Doubles
- Career record: 390–236
- Career titles: 26
- Highest ranking: No. 3 (15 July 1985)

Grand Slam doubles results
- Australian Open: 1R (1973, 1979, 1990)
- French Open: W (1981)
- Wimbledon: W (1985)
- US Open: SF (1984)
Medal record
Summer Universiade
Silver medal – second place	1973 Moscow	Singles
Bronze medal – third place	1973 Moscow	Doubles
Silver medal – second place	1977 Sofia	Singles

Balázs Taróczy (Hungarian: Taróczy Balázs; born 9 May 1954) is a retired tennis player from Hungary. The right-hander won 13 singles titles in his career, and achieved a career-high singles ranking of world No. 12 in April 1982 and world No. 3 in doubles in July 1985.

== Tennis career ==
Taróczy was six times a Hungarian national champion. He also won the singles title at the Dutch Open on six occasions (1976, 1978–82), which made up nearly half of his total number of singles titles.

One of the game's premier doubles players, Balazs and partner Heinz Günthardt won the 1985 Wimbledon doubles title. Though never especially proficient on the grass, the duo defeated the Australian pair Pat Cash and John Fitzgerald in four sets.

He became the Hungarian No. 1 player in 1973 and was a member of the Hungary Davis Cup team from 1973 to 1985.

Despite playing part-time, still managed to finish top 50 in the doubles world rankings at No. 45 in 1989.

From September 1989 to the end of 1990, he was the coach of Goran Ivanišević.

== Career finals ==
=== Singles: 20 (13 wins / 7 losses) ===
Legend Grand Slam (0) Grand Prix Masters (0) Grand Prix Super Series (0) Grand Prix Regular Series (13)	Titles by surface Hard (0) Clay (13) Grass (0) Carpet (0)

Result	W/L	Date	Tournament	Surface	Opponent	Score
Win	1–0	Jul 1974	Kitzbühel, Austria	Clay	(New Zealand) Onny Parun	6–1, 6–4, 6–4
Win	2–0	Jul 1976	Hilversum, Netherlands	Clay	(Argentina) Ricardo Cano	6–4, 6–0, 6–1
Loss	2–1	Jul 1977	Båstad, Sweden	Clay	(Italy) Corrado Barazzutti	6–7, 7–6, 2–6
Win	3–1	Jul 1978	Hilversum, Netherlands (2)	Clay	(Netherlands) Tom Okker	2–6, 6–1, 6–2, 6–4
Win	4–1	Oct 1978	Barcelona, Spain	Clay	(Romania) Ilie Năstase	1–6, 7–5, 4–6, 6–3, 6–4
Loss	4–2	Oct 1978	Vienna, Austria	Hard	(United States) Stan Smith	6–4, 6–7, 6–7, 3–6
Win	5–2	Jun 1979	Brussels, Belgium	Clay	(Czechoslovakia) Ivan Lendl	6–1, 1–6, 6–3
Loss	5–3	Jul 1979	Båstad, Sweden	Clay	(Sweden) Björn Borg	1–6, 5–7
Win	6–3	Jul 1979	Hilversum, Netherlands (3)	Clay	(Czechoslovakia) Tomáš Šmíd	6–2, 6–2, 6–1
Loss	6–4	Jun 1980	Brussels, Belgium	Clay	(Australia) Peter McNamara	6–7, 3–6, 0–6
Win	7–4	Jul 1980	Båstad, Sweden	Clay	(United States) Tony Giammalva	6–3, 3–6, 7–6
Win	8–4	Jul 1980	Hilversum, Netherlands (4)	Clay	(Zimbabwe) Haroon Ismail	6–3, 6–2, 6–1
Win	9–4	Sep 1980	Geneva, Switzerland	Clay	(Italy) Adriano Panatta	6–3, 6–2
Loss	9–5	Apr 1981	Bournemouth, UK	Clay	(Paraguay) Víctor Pecci	3–6, 4–6
Win	10–5	Jul 1981	Hilversum, Netherlands (5)	Clay	(Switzerland) Heinz Günthardt	6–3, 6–7, 6–4
Win	11–5	Oct 1981	Tokyo, Japan	Clay	(United States) Eliot Teltscher	6–3, 1–6, 7–6^{(7–3)}
Win	12–5	Apr 1982	Nice, France	Clay	(France) Yannick Noah	6–2, 3–6, 13–11
Win	13–5	Jul 1982	Hilversum, Netherlands (6)	Clay	(United Kingdom) Buster Mottram	7–6^{(7–5)}, 6–7^{(3–7)}, 6–3, 7–6^{(7–5)}
Loss	13–6	Jul 1983	Hilversum, Netherlands	Clay	(Czechoslovakia) Tomáš Šmíd	4–6, 4–6
Loss	13–7	Aug 1984	Indianapolis, US	Clay	(Ecuador) Andrés Gómez	0–6, 6–7^{(5–7)}

=== Doubles: 59 (26 wins / 33 losses) ===
Result	W/L	Year	Tournament	Surface	Partner	Opponents	Score
Loss	0–1	Oct 1973	Prague, Czechoslovakia	Clay	(Hungary) Róbert Machán	(Czechoslovakia) Jan Kodeš (Czechoslovakia) Vladimir Zednik	3–6, 6–7
Loss	0–2	May 1974	Florence, Italy	Clay	(Hungary) Róbert Machán	(Italy) Paolo Bertolucci (Italy) Adriano Panatta	3–6, 6–3, 4–6
Loss	0–3	Jul 1974	Kitzbühel, Austria	Clay	(Czechoslovakia) František Pála	(Colombia) Iván Molina (Colombia) Jairo Velasco	6–2, 6–7, 4–6, 4–6
Loss	0–4	Mar 1975	Rotterdam WCT, Netherlands	Carpet (i)	(Spain) José Higueras	(South Africa) Bob Hewitt (South Africa) Frew McMillan	2–6, 2–6
Loss	0–5	May 1976	Florence, Italy	Clay	(Hungary) Péter Szőke	(Australia) Colin Dibley (Brazil) Carlos Kirmayr	7–5, 5–7, 5–7
Loss	0–6	Jul 1976	Hilversum, Netherlands	Clay	(Poland) Wojciech Fibak	(Argentina) Ricardo Cano (Chile) Belus Prajoux	4–6, 3–6
Win	1–6	May 1977	Munich, Germany	Clay	(Czechoslovakia) František Pála	(Socialist Federal Republic of Yugoslavia) Nikola Špear (United States) John Whitlinger	6–3, 6–4
Loss	1–7	Jul 1978	Båstad, Sweden	Clay	(Hungary) Péter Szőke	(Australia) Bob Carmichael (Australia) Mark Edmondson	5–7, 4–6
Win	2–7	Jul 1978	Hilversum, Netherlands	Clay	(Netherlands) Tom Okker	(Australia) Bob Carmichael (Australia) Mark Edmondson	7–6, 4–6, 7–5
Win	3–7	Aug 1978	Boston, US	Clay	(Paraguay) Víctor Pecci	(Switzerland) Heinz Günthardt (United States) Van Winitsky	6–3, 3–6, 6–1
Win	4–7	Oct 1978	Vienna, Austria	Carpet (i)	(Paraguay) Víctor Pecci	(South Africa) Bob Hewitt (South Africa) Frew McMillan	6–3, 6–7, 6–4
Loss	4–8	Apr 1979	Monte Carlo, Monaco	Clay	(Paraguay) Víctor Pecci	(Romania) Ilie Năstase (Mexico) Raúl Ramírez	3–6, 4–6
Loss	4–9	Jun 1979	Brussels, Belgium	Clay	(Brazil) Carlos Kirmayr	(United States) Billy Martin (Australia) Peter McNamara	7–5, 5–7, 4–6
Win	5–9	Jul 1979	Hilversum, Netherlands	Clay	(Netherlands) Tom Okker	(Czechoslovakia) Jan Kodeš (Czechoslovakia) Tomáš Šmíd	6–1, 6–3
Loss	5–10	May 1980	Rome, Italy	Clay	(United States) Eliot Teltscher	(Australia) Mark Edmondson (Australia) Kim Warwick	6–7, 6–7
Win	6–10	Jul 1980	Hilversum, Netherlands	Clay	(Netherlands) Tom Okker	(United States) Tony Giammalva (United Kingdom) Buster Mottram	7–5, 6–3, 7–6
Loss	6–11	Sep 1980	Palermo, Italy	Clay	(Paraguay) Víctor Pecci	(Italy) Gianni Ocleppo (Ecuador) Ricardo Ycaza	2–6, 2–6
Win	7–11	Sep 1980	Geneva, Switzerland	Clay	(Socialist Federal Republic of Yugoslavia) Željko Franulović	(Switzerland) Heinz Günthardt (Switzerland) Markus Günthardt	6–4, 4–6, 6–4
Loss	7–12	Oct 1980	Madrid, Spain	Clay	(Czechoslovakia) Jan Kodeš	(Chile) Hans Gildemeister (Ecuador) Andrés Gómez	6–3, 3–6, 8–10
Loss	7–13	Oct 1980	Barcelona, Spain	Clay	(Czechoslovakia) Pavel Složil	(United States) Steve Denton (Czechoslovakia) Ivan Lendl	2–6, 7–6, 3–6
Win	8–13	Nov 1980	Bologna Indoor, Italy	Carpet (i)	(United States) Butch Walts	(United States) Steve Denton (Australia) Paul McNamee	2–6, 6–3, 6–0
Win	9–13	Mar 1981	Cairo, Egypt	Clay	(Egypt) Ismail El Shafei	(Italy) Paolo Bertolucci (Italy) Gianni Ocleppo	6–7, 6–3, 6–1
Win	10–13	Apr 1981	Monte Carlo, Monaco	Clay	(Switzerland) Heinz Günthardt	(Czechoslovakia) Pavel Složil (Czechoslovakia) Tomáš Šmíd	6–3, 6–3
Win	11–13	Jun 1981	French Open, Paris	Clay	(Switzerland) Heinz Günthardt	(United States) Terry Moor (United States) Eliot Teltscher	6–2, 7–6, 6–3
Win	12–13	Jul 1981	Hilversum, Netherlands	Clay	(Switzerland) Heinz Günthardt	(South Africa) Raymond Moore (South Africa) Andrew Pattison	6–0, 6–2
Win	13–13	Sep 1981	Geneva, Switzerland	Clay	(Switzerland) Heinz Günthardt	(Czechoslovakia) Pavel Složil (Czechoslovakia) Tomáš Šmíd	6–4, 3–6, 6–2
Win	14–13	Oct 1981	Tokyo Outdoor, Japan	Clay	(Switzerland) Heinz Günthardt	(United States) Larry Stefanki (United States) Robert Van't Hof	3–6, 6–2, 6–1
Loss	14–14	Oct 1981	Tokyo Indoor, Japan	Carpet (i)	(Switzerland) Heinz Günthardt	(United States) Victor Amaya (United States) Hank Pfister	4–6, 2–6
Loss	14–15	Nov 1981	Bologna Indoor, Italy	Carpet (i)	(Czechoslovakia) Tomáš Šmíd	(United States) Sammy Giammalva Jr. (France) Henri Leconte	6–7, 4–6
Win	15–15	Jan 1982	Masters Doubles WCT, London	Carpet (i)	(Switzerland) Heinz Günthardt	(South Africa) Kevin Curren (United States) Steve Denton	6–7, 6–3, 7–5, 6–4
Loss	15–16	Jan 1982	Mexico City WCT, Mexico City	Carpet (i)	(Czechoslovakia) Tomáš Šmíd	(United States) Sherwood Stewart (United States) Ferdi Taygan	4–6, 5–7
Loss	15–17	Jan 1982	Delray Beach WCT, U.S.	Clay	(Czechoslovakia) Tomáš Šmíd	(United States) Mel Purcell (United States) Eliot Teltscher	4–6, 6–7
Loss	15–18	Apr 1982	Nice, France	Clay	(Australia) Paul McNamee	(France) Henri Leconte (France) Yannick Noah	7–5, 4–6, 3–6
Loss	15–19	May 1982	Madrid, Spain	Clay	(Switzerland) Heinz Günthardt	(Czechoslovakia) Pavel Složil (Czechoslovakia) Tomáš Šmíd	1–6, 6–3, 7–9
Win	16–19	May 1982	Rome, Italy	Clay	(Switzerland) Heinz Günthardt	(Poland) Wojciech Fibak (Australia) John Fitzgerald	6–4, 4–6, 6–3
Loss	16–20	Jul 1982	Hilversum, Netherlands	Clay	(Switzerland) Heinz Günthardt	(Czechoslovakia) Jan Kodeš (Czechoslovakia) Tomáš Šmíd	6–7, 4–6
Win	17–20	Jan 1983	Masters Doubles WCT, London	Carpet (i)	(Switzerland) Heinz Günthardt	(United States) Brian Gottfried (Mexico) Raúl Ramírez	6–3, 7–5, 7–6
Win	18–20	Mar 1983	Brussels, Belgium	Carpet (i)	(Switzerland) Heinz Günthardt	(Sweden) Hans Simonsson (Sweden) Mats Wilander	6–2, 6–4
Loss	18–21	Mar 1983	Munich WCT, Germany	Carpet (i)	(Switzerland) Heinz Günthardt	(South Africa) Kevin Curren (United States) Steve Denton	5–7, 6–2, 1–6
Win	19–21	Apr 1983	Monte Carlo, Monaco	Clay	(Switzerland) Heinz Günthardt	(France) Henri Leconte (France) Yannick Noah	6–2, 6–4
Loss	19–22	Apr 1983	Bournemouth, England	Clay	(Switzerland) Heinz Günthardt	(Czechoslovakia) Tomáš Šmíd (United States) Sherwood Stewart	6–7, 5–7
Win	20–22	May 1983	Hamburg, Germany	Clay	(Switzerland) Heinz Günthardt	(Australia) Mark Edmondson (United States) Brian Gottfried	7–6, 4–6, 6–4
Win	21–22	Jul 1983	Hilversum, Netherlands	Clay	(Switzerland) Heinz Günthardt	(Czechoslovakia) Jan Kodeš (Czechoslovakia) Tomáš Šmíd	3–6, 6–2, 6–3
Loss	21–23	May 1984	Hamburg, Germany	Clay	(Switzerland) Heinz Günthardt	(Sweden) Stefan Edberg (Sweden) Anders Järryd	3–6, 1–6
Loss	21–24	Aug 1984	Indianapolis, U.S.	Clay	(Switzerland) Heinz Günthardt	(United States) Ken Flach (United States) Robert Seguso	6–7, 5–7
Loss	21–25	Aug 1984	Cincinnati, U.S.	Hard	(United States) Sandy Mayer	(Paraguay) Francisco González (United States) Matt Mitchell	6–4, 3–6, 6–7
Loss	21–26	Oct 1984	Vienna, Austria	Carpet (i)	(Switzerland) Heinz Günthardt	(Poland) Wojciech Fibak (United States) Sandy Mayer	4–6, 4–6
Loss	21–27	Jan 1985	Masters Doubles WCT, London	Carpet (i)	(Switzerland) Heinz Günthardt	(United States) Ken Flach (United States) Robert Seguso	3–6, 6–3, 3–6, 0–6
Win	22–27	Feb 1985	La Quinta, US	Hard	(Switzerland) Heinz Günthardt	(United States) Ken Flach (United States) Robert Seguso	3–6, 7–6, 6–3
Loss	22–28	Apr 1985	Hamburg, Germany	Clay	(Switzerland) Heinz Günthardt	(Chile) Hans Gildemeister (Ecuador) Andrés Gómez	6–1, 6–7, 4–6
Win	23–28	Jul 1985	Wimbledon, London	Grass	(Switzerland) Heinz Günthardt	(Australia) Pat Cash (Australia) John Fitzgerald	6–4, 6–3, 4–6, 6–3
Loss	23–29	Jul 1985	Washington, D.C., US	Hard	(United States) David Graham	(Chile) Hans Gildemeister (Paraguay) Víctor Pecci	3–6, 6–1, 4–6
Win	24–29	Jan 1986	Masters Doubles WCT, London	Carpet (i)	(Switzerland) Heinz Günthardt	(United States) Paul Annacone (South Africa) Christo van Rensburg	6–4, 1–6, 7–6, 6–7, 6–4
Loss	24–30	Aug 1988	Saint-Vincent, Italy	Clay	(Italy) Paolo Canè	(Argentina) Alberto Mancini (Argentina) Christian Miniussi	4–6, 7–5, 3–6
Win	25–30	Oct 1988	Vienna, Austria	Carpet (i)	(Austria) Alex Antonitsch	(United States) Kevin Curren (Czechoslovakia) Tomáš Šmíd	4–6, 6–3, 7–6
Loss	25–31	Feb 1989	Milan, Italy	Carpet (i)	(Switzerland) Heinz Günthardt	(Switzerland) Jakob Hlasek (United States) John McEnroe	3–6, 4–6
Loss	25–32	Apr 1989	Nice, France	Clay	(Switzerland) Heinz Günthardt	(West Germany) Ricki Osterthun (West Germany) Udo Riglewski	6–7, 7–6, 1–6
Win	26–32	May 1989	Munich, Germany	Clay	(Spain) Javier Sánchez	(Australia) Peter Doohan (Australia) Laurie Warder	7–6, 6–7, 7–6
Loss	26–33	Feb 1990	Brussels, Belgium	Carpet (i)	(Socialist Federal Republic of Yugoslavia) Goran Ivanišević	(Spain) Emilio Sánchez (Socialist Federal Republic of Yugoslavia) Slobodan Živojinović	5–7, 3–6
