= Nduka Odizor =

Nigerian tennis player

- Country (sports): Nigeria
- Born: 9 August 1958 (age 67) Lagos, Nigeria
- Height: 1.82 m (6 ft 0 in)
- Plays: Right-handed (one-handed backhand)
- Prize money: $675,673

Singles
- Career record: 82–124
- Career titles: 1
- Highest ranking: No. 52 (11 June 1984)

Grand Slam singles results
- Australian Open: 3R (1985)
- French Open: 1R (1986)
- Wimbledon: 4R (1983)
- US Open: 3R (1985, 1987)

Doubles
- Career record: 137–138
- Career titles: 7
- Highest ranking: No. 20 (27 August 1984)

Grand Slam doubles results
- Australian Open: 3R (1983, 1987)
- French Open: 1R (1989, 1990)
- Wimbledon: 3R (1982)
- US Open: QF (1983)

Nduka Emmanuel Odizor (born 28 August 1958) is a former tennis player from Nigeria, who represented his native country at the 1988 Summer Olympics in Seoul. He won one career title in singles (Taipei, 1983) and seven doubles titles. He reached his highest ATP singles ranking of world No. 52 in June 1984 and reached No. 20 in doubles in August 1984. Between 1986 and 1993 he played in 11 ties for the Nigerian Davis Cup team and compiled a 20–13 win-loss record.

== Career finals ==
=== Singles (1 win) ===
Result	W/L	Date	Tournament	Surface	Opponent	Score
Win	1–0	Nov 1983	Taipei, Taiwan	Carpet (i)	(United States) Scott Davis	6–4, 3–6, 6–4

=== Doubles (7 wins, 4 losses) ===
Result	W/L	Date	Tournament	Surface	Partner	Opponents	Score
Win	1–0	Mar 1983	Monterrey, Mexico	Carpet (i)	(United States) David Dowlen	(United States) Andy Andrews (United States) John Sadri	3–6, 6–3, 6–4
Win	2–0	Sep 1983	Dallas, U.S.	Hard	(United States) Van Winitsky	(United States) Steve Denton (United States) Sherwood Stewart	6–3, 7–5
Loss	2–1	Apr 1984	Boca West, U.S.	Hard	(United States) David Dowlen	(Australia) Mark Edmondson (United States) Sherwood Stewart	6–4, 1–6, 4–6
Loss	2–2	Apr 1984	Houston, U.S.	Clay	(United States) David Dowlen	(Australia) Pat Cash (Australia) Paul McNamee	5–7, 6–4, 3–6
Win	3–2	May 1984	Forest Hills WCT, U.S.	Clay	(United States) David Dowlen	(Puerto Rico) Ernie Fernandez (United States) David Pate	7–6, 7–5
Win	4–2	Oct 1984	Tokyo Outdoor, Japan	Hard	(United States) David Dowlen	(United States) Mark Dickson (United States) Steve Meister	6–7, 6–4, 6–3
Loss	4–3	Oct 1985	Melbourne Indoor, Australia	Carpet (i)	(United States) David Dowlen	(Australia) Brad Drewett (United States) Matt Mitchell	6–4, 6–7, 4–6
Win	5–3	Dec 1985	Sydney Outdoor, Australia	Grass	(United States) David Dowlen	(Australia) Broderick Dyke (Australia) Wally Masur	6–4, 7–6
Loss	5–4	Feb 1988	Metz, France	Carpet (i)	(United States) Rill Baxter	(Czechoslovakia) Jaroslav Navrátil (Netherlands) Tom Nijssen	2–6, 7–6, 6–7
Win	6–4	Jan 1990	Adelaide, Australia	Hard	(United Kingdom) Andrew Castle	(West Germany) Alexander Mronz (Netherlands) Michiel Schapers	7–6, 6–2
Win	7–4	Oct 1990	Tel Aviv, Israel	Hard	(South Africa) Christo van Rensburg	(Sweden) Ronnie Båthman (Sweden) Rikard Bergh	6–3, 6–4
