= David Dowlen =

American tennis player

- Country (sports): United States
- Born: February 8, 1960 (age 65); Houston, Texas
- Height: 5 ft 10 in (178 cm)
- Plays: Right-handed
- Prize money: $145,552

Singles
- Career record: 10–26
- Highest ranking: No. 95 (August 27, 1984)

Grand Slam singles results
- Australian Open: 1R (1983, 1984)
- Wimbledon: 2R (1982)
- US Open: 1R (1978

Doubles
- Career record: 92–91
- Career titles: 4
- Highest ranking: No. 30 (August 13, 1984)

Grand Slam doubles results
- Australian Open: 3R (1983)
- French Open: 1R (1986, 1988)
- Wimbledon: 3R (1982)
- US Open: QF (1983)

David Dowlen (born February 8, 1960) is an American former professional tennis player.

Dowlen won the USTA National Boys 18 Championship in 1978. After, he was a leading player on the University of Houston tennis team.

Dowlen enjoyed most of his tennis success while playing doubles. During his career, he won four doubles titles. He achieved a career-high doubles ranking of World No. 30 in 1984. He achieved much of his success alongside doubles partner Nduka Odizor, including beating John McEnroe.

== Career finals ==
=== Doubles (4 wins, 3 losses) ===
Result	W/L	Date	Tournament	Surface	Partner	Opponents	Score
Win	1–0	Mar 1983	Monterrey, Mexico	Carpet	(Nigeria) Nduka Odizor	(United States) Andy Andrews (United States) John Sadri	3–6, 6–3, 6–4
Loss	1–1	Apr 1984	Boca West, U.S.	Hard	(Nigeria) Nduka Odizor	(Australia) Mark Edmondson (United States) Sherwood Stewart	6–4, 1–6, 4–6
Loss	1–2	Apr 1984	Houston, U.S.	Clay	(Nigeria) Nduka Odizor	(Australia) Pat Cash (Australia) Paul McNamee	5–7, 6–4, 3–6
Win	2–2	May 1984	Forest Hills WCT, U.S.	Clay	(Nigeria) Nduka Odizor	(United States) Ernie Fernandez (United States) David Pate	7–6, 7–5
Win	3–2	Oct 1984	Tokyo Outdoor, Japan	Hard	(Nigeria) Nduka Odizor	(United States) Mark Dickson (United States) Steve Meister	6–7, 6–4, 6–3
Loss	3–3	Oct 1985	Melbourne Indoor, Australia	Carpet	(Nigeria) Nduka Odizor	(Australia) Brad Drewett (United States) Matt Mitchell	6–4, 6–7, 4–6
Win	4–3	Dec 1985	Sydney Outdoor, Australia	Grass	(Nigeria) Nduka Odizor	(Australia) Broderick Dyke (Australia) Wally Masur	6–4, 7–6
