= Larry Stefanki =

American tennis player and coach

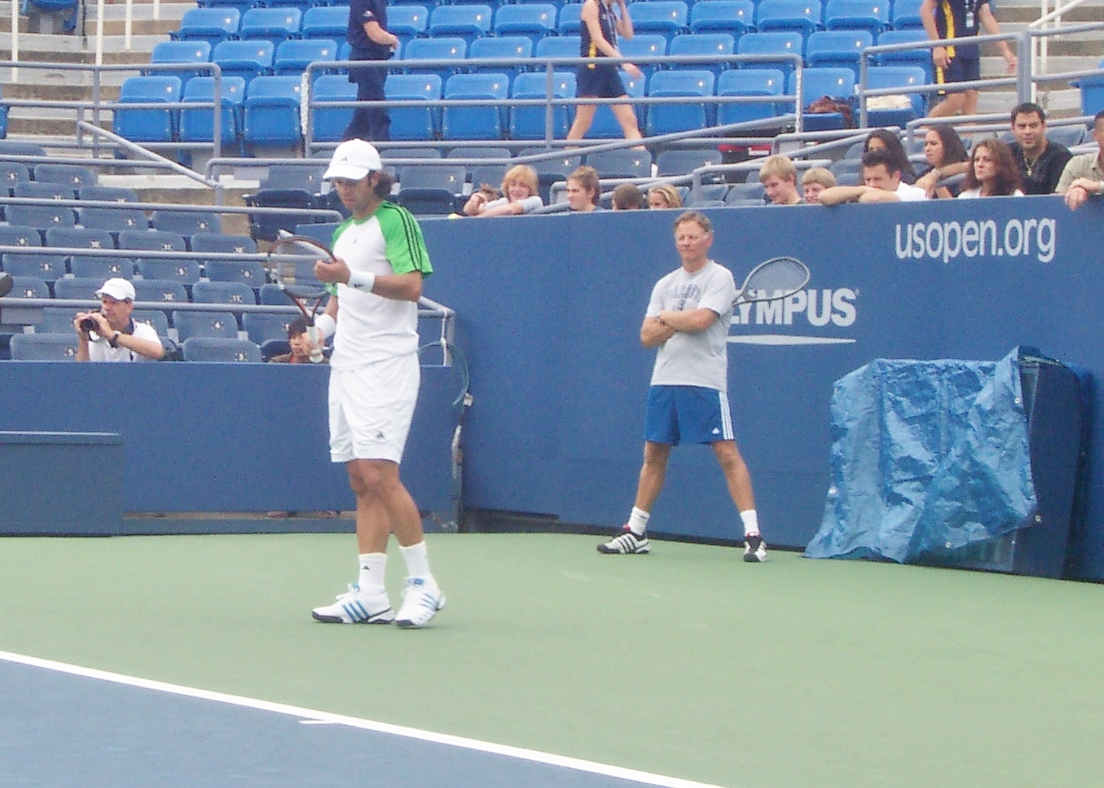
- Stefanki coaching Fernando González
- Country (sports): United States
- Born: July 23, 1957 (age 68) Elmhurst, Illinois, U.S.
- Height: 1.78 m (5 ft 10 in)
- Turned pro: 1979
- Retired: 1988
- Plays: Right-handed (one-handed backhand)
- Prize money: $290,073

Singles
- Career record: 57–87
- Career titles: 1
- Highest ranking: No. 35 (25 February 1985)

Grand Slam singles results
- Australian Open: 2R (1981)
- French Open: 1R (1981)
- Wimbledon: 3R (1982)
- US Open: 2R (1981, 1982)

Doubles
- Career record: 92–105
- Career titles: 3
- Highest ranking: No. 50 (9 July 1984)

Grand Slam doubles results
- Australian Open: 2R (1981, 1982)
- French Open: 2R (1981)
- Wimbledon: 3R (1985)
- US Open: 2R (1981, 1982, 1983, 1984)

Grand Slam mixed doubles results
- Wimbledon: 2R (1982, 1984)
- US Open: 1R (1982, 1986)

Coaching career (1995–)
- John McEnroe (1992); Marcelo Ríos 1995–1998; Yevgeny Kafelnikov 1999–2001; Tim Henman 2001–2003 Fernando González 2006–2008; Andy Roddick 2009–2012; Maria Sharapova 2013

Coaching achievements
- Coachee singles titles total: 10(R) – 6(K) – 3(H) – 3(G) – 4(R) = 26 total
- Coachee doubles titles total: 3(Mc) – 1(R) – 5(K) – 1(R) = 10 total
- List of notable tournaments (with champion): 1992 Wimbledon (McEnroe doubles); 1992 Paris Open (McEnroe doubles); (United States) 1992 Davis Cup champion (McEnroe doubles); 1997 Monaco Masters (Ríos); 1998 Indian Wells, Miami, Rome Masters (Ríos); 1999 Australian Open (Kafelnikov); Gold medal 2000 Summer Olympics (Kafelnikov); 2000 Monaco Masters (Kaf. D.); 2001 Indian Wells, Rome (Kaf. D.); 2010 Miami Masters (Roddick); 2009 Indian Wells Masters (Roddick D.)
- Last updated on: 26 September 2022.

Larry Stefanki (born July 23, 1957), is an American tennis coach and former professional tennis player.

== Tennis career ==
He played for nine years starting in 1979, reaching a career-high ranking of World No. 35 in singles after winning the Indian Wells Masters at La Quinta in 1985 as well as three in doubles. He is one of three Stefanki brothers to have played on the varsity tennis team at the University of California, Berkeley, from 1977 until 1979 under coach Bill Wright. As a freshman in 1976 at Foothill College, he won the California Junior College Championship in Singles and Doubles.

=== Coaching ===
He is more renowned as a tennis coach, having trained such players as John McEnroe, Marcelo Ríos, Yevgeny Kafelnikov, and Tim Henman amongst others. Ríos and Kafelnikov both achieved their number 1 tennis rankings while under his guidance, and Henman reached a career high of #4 under his tutelage.

Stefanki was also the coach of Fernando González, after taking over this role from Horacio de la Peña in May 2006. Under Stefanki the Chilean reached back-to-back finals in Vienna, the Madrid Masters and Basel in 2006 and the 2007 Australian Open final —a tournament in which he eased past the likes of Lleyton Hewitt, James Blake, Rafael Nadal, and Tommy Haas— which saw González, 26, reach a career high of #5 in the ATP rankings.

Stefanki was the coach of American tennis player Andy Roddick until his retirement in 2012. He is credited with improving Roddick's tactics and all-court game and helping him reach the semifinals of the 2009 Australian Open, the fourth round of the 2009 French Open for the first time, the 2009 Wimbledon final for the third time, winning the 2010 Sony Ericsson Masters in Miami and the 2010 Brisbane International in Brisbane, Australia. Stefanki has recently been working with Olympic developmental hopefuls in Los Angeles. He and his wife and three sons now live in Encinitas, California.

== ATP career finals ==
=== Singles: 1 (1 title) ===
Legend Grand Slam Tournaments (0–0) ATP World Tour Finals (0–0) ATP Masters Series (1–0) ATP Championship Series (0–0) ATP World Series (0–0)	Finals by surface Hard (1–0) Clay (0–0) Grass (0–0) Carpet (0–0)	Finals by setting Outdoors (1–0) Indoors (0–0)

Result	W–L	Date	Tournament	Tier	Surface	Opponent	Score
Win	1–0	Feb 1985	La Quinta, United States	Grand Prix	Hard	(United States) David Pate	6–1, 6–4, 3–6, 6–3

=== Doubles: 7 (3 titles, 4 runner-ups) ===
Legend Grand Slam Tournaments (0–0) ATP World Tour Finals (0–0) ATP Masters Series (0–0) ATP Championship Series (0–0) ATP World Series (3–4)	Finals by surface Hard (1–1) Clay (0–1) Grass (1–0) Carpet (1–2)	Finals by setting Outdoors (2–2) Indoors (1–2)

Result	W–L	Date	Tournament	Tier	Surface	Partnet	Opponents	Score
Loss	0–1	Mar 1980	Stuttgart, Germany	Grand Prix	Carpet	(United States) Chris Mayotte	(Poland) Wojtek Fibak (Czechoslovakia) Tomáš Šmíd	4–6, 6–7
Loss	0–2	Oct 1980	Canton, China	Grand Prix	Carpet	(United States) Andy Kohlberg	(Australia) Ross Case (Chile) Jaime Fillol	2–6, 6–7
Win	1–2	Aug 1981	Stowe, United States	Grand Prix	Hard	(United States) Johan Kriek	(United States) Brian Gottfried (United States) Bob Lutz	2–6, 6–1, 6–2
Loss	1–3	Oct 1981	Tokyo, Japan	Grand Prix	Clay	(United States) Robert Van't Hof	(Switzerland) Heinz Günthardt (Hungary) Balázs Taróczy	6–3, 2–6, 1–6
Loss	1–4	Jan 1982	Auckland, New Zealand	Grand Prix	Hard	(United States) Robert Van't Hof	(United Kingdom) Andrew Jarrett (United Kingdom) Jonathan Smith	5–7, 6–7
Win	2–4	Nov 1982	Taipei, Taiwan	Grand Prix	Carpet	(United States) Robert Van't Hof	(United States) Fred McNair (United States) Tim Wilkison	6–3, 7–6
Win	3–4	Jun 1984	Bristol, United Kingdom	Grand Prix	Grass	(United States) Robert Van't Hof	(Australia) John Alexander (Australia) John Fitzgerald	6–4, 5–7, 9–7

== ATP Challenger and ITF Futures finals ==
=== Singles: 1 (1–0) ===
Legend ATP Challenger (1–0) ITF Futures (0–0)	Finals by surface Hard (1–0) Clay (0–0) Grass (0–0) Carpet (0–0)

Result	W–L	Date	Tournament	Tier	Surface	Opponent	Score
Win	1–0	Mar 1981	Lagos, Nigeria	Challenger	Hard	(Austria) Peter Feigl	5–7, 6–3, 6–0

=== Doubles: 1 (1–0) ===
Legend ATP Challenger (1–0) ITF Futures (0–0)	Finals by surface Hard (1–0) Clay (0–0) Grass (0–0) Carpet (0–0)

Result	W–L	Date	Tournament	Tier	Surface	Partner	Opponents	Score
Win	1–0	Mar 1981	Lagos, Nigeria	Challenger	Hard	(United States) Bruce Kleege	(United States) Ian Harris (United States) Craig Wittus	6–2, 3–6, 6–3

== Performance timelines ==
Key
W	F	SF	QF	#R	RR	Q#	DNQ	A	NH

(W) winner; (F) finalist; (SF) semifinalist; (QF) quarterfinalist; (#R) rounds 4, 3, 2, 1; (RR) round-robin stage; (Q#) qualification round; (DNQ) did not qualify; (A) absent; (NH) not held; (SR) strike rate (events won / competed); (W–L) win–loss record.

=== Singles ===
Tournament	1980	1981	1982	1983	1984	1985	1986	1987	1988	1989	1990	1991	SR	W–L	Win %
Grand Slam tournaments
Australian Open	A	2R	1R	1R	1R	A	NH	A	A	A	A	Q3	0 / 4	1–4	20%
French Open	A	1R	A	A	A	A	A	A	A	A	A	A	0 / 1	0–1	0%
Wimbledon	Q1	1R	3R	Q3	1R	1R	Q3	1R	A	A	A	A	0 / 5	2–5	29%
US Open	A	2R	2R	A	1R	A	A	A	A	A	A	A	0 / 3	2–3	40%
Win–loss	0–0	2–4	3–3	0–1	0–3	0–1	0–0	0–1	0–0	0–0	0–0	0–0	0 / 13	5–13	28%
ATP Masters Series
Indian Wells	A	A	A	A	1R	W	2R	2R	A	A	A	A	1 / 4	8–3	73%
Miami	A	A	A	A	A	1R	1R	A	A	A	A	A	0 / 2	0–2	0%
Canada	A	A	A	1R	A	A	A	A	A	A	A	A	0 / 1	0–1	0%
Cincinnati	A	1R	A	2R	2R	A	A	A	A	A	A	A	0 / 3	2–3	40%
Win–loss	0–0	0–1	0–0	1–2	1–2	6–1	1–2	1–1	0–0	0–0	0–0	0–0	1 / 10	10–9	53%

=== Doubles ===
Tournament	1980	1981	1982	1983	1984	1985	1986	1987	SR	W–L	Win %
Grand Slam tournaments
Australian Open	A	2R	2R	1R	1R	A	NH	A	0 / 4	1–4	20%
French Open	1R	2R	A	A	A	A	A	A	0 / 2	1–2	33%
Wimbledon	2R	1R	2R	1R	2R	3R	1R	2R	0 / 8	6–8	43%
US Open	1R	2R	2R	2R	2R	A	A	A	0 / 5	4–5	44%
Win–loss	1–3	3–4	2–3	1–3	2–3	2–1	0–1	1–1	0 / 19	12–19	39%
ATP Masters Series
Indian Wells	A	1R	A	A	2R	1R	1R	1R	0 / 5	1–5	17%
Miami	A	A	A	A	A	1R	2R	A	0 / 2	1–2	33%
Hamburg	1R	A	A	A	A	A	A	A	0 / 1	0–1	0%
Canada	A	A	A	QF	1R	A	A	A	0 / 2	2–2	50%
Cincinnati	A	A	A	A	2R	A	A	A	0 / 1	1–1	50%
Win–loss	0–1	0–1	0–0	2–1	2–3	0–2	1–2	0–1	0 / 11	5–11	31%
