= David Pate =

American tennis player

- Country (sports): United States
- Residence: Las Vegas, Nevada, US
- Born: April 16, 1962 (age 64) Los Angeles, California, US
- Height: 1.82 m (6 ft 0 in)
- Turned pro: 1983
- Retired: 1996
- Plays: Right-handed (one-handed backhand)
- Prize money: $2,029,723

Singles
- Career record: 181–168
- Career titles: 2
- Highest ranking: No. 18 (June 8, 1987)

Grand Slam singles results
- Australian Open: 2R (1982, 1983, 1985)
- French Open: 1R (1984, 1989, 1991)
- Wimbledon: 3R (1985, 1986, 1989, 1990)
- US Open: 3R (1985)

Doubles
- Career record: 322–244
- Career titles: 18
- Highest ranking: No. 1 (January 14, 1991)

Grand Slam doubles results
- Australian Open: W (1991)
- French Open: QF (1994)
- Wimbledon: QF (1992)
- US Open: F (1991)

David Pate (born April 16, 1962) is a former professional tennis player from the United States who won two singles titles and eighteen doubles titles during his career. He reached a career-high singles ranking of World No. 18 in June 1987 and attained the world No. 1 doubles ranking in January 1991. His greatest success came in 1991 when he won the Australian Open doubles title together with compatriot Scott Davis and reached the doubles final at the US Open later that year. Before turning professional, Pate played college tennis at Texas Christian University (TCU) in Fort Worth, Texas, where he was a six time All-American playing for the Horned Frogs.

== Career finals ==
=== Singles: 4 (2 wins / 4 losses) ===
Legend
Grand Slam (0–0)
Tennis Masters Cup (0–0)
ATP Masters Series (0–1)
ATP Championship Series (0–0)
Grand Prix (2–3)

Result	W/L	Date	Tournament	Surface	Opponent	Score
Loss	0–1	Sep 1984	Honolulu, U.S.	Hard	(United States) Marty Davis	1–6, 2–6
Win	1–1	Oct 1984	Tokyo, Japan	Hard	(United States) Terry Moor	6–3, 7–5
Loss	1–2	Feb 1985	La Quinta, U.S.	Hard	(United States) Larry Stefanki	1–6, 4–6, 6–3, 3–6
Loss	1–3	Apr 1987	Chicago, U.S.	Carpet (i)	(United States) Tim Mayotte	4–6, 2–6
Loss	1–4	Apr 1987	Tokyo, Japan	Hard	(Sweden) Stefan Edberg	6–7^{(2–7)}, 4–6
Win	2–4	Sep 1987	Los Angeles, U.S.	Hard	(Sweden) Stefan Edberg	6–4, 6–4

=== Doubles: 36 (18 wins / 18 losses) ===
Legend Grand Slam (1) Tennis Masters Cup (0) ATP Masters Series (1) ATP Championship Series (2) Grand Prix (14)	Titles by surface Hard (13) Clay (1) Grass (0) Carpet (4)

Result	W/L	Date	Tournament	Surface	Partner	Opponents	Score
Loss	0–1	May 1984	Forest Hills WCT, U.S.	Clay	(Puerto Rico) Ernie Fernández	(United States) David Dowlen (Nigeria) Nduka Odizor	6–7, 5–7
Loss	0–2	Apr 1985	Fort Myers, U.S.	Hard	(United States) Sammy Giammalva Jr.	(United States) Ken Flach (United States) Robert Seguso	6–3, 3–6, 3–6
Win	1–2	Aug 1985	Stratton Mountain, U.S.	Hard	(United States) Scott Davis	(United States) Ken Flach (United States) Robert Seguso	3–6, 7–6, 7–6
Win	2–2	1985	Tokyo Outdoor, Japan	Hard	(United States) Scott Davis	(United States) Sammy Giammalva Jr. (United States) Greg Holmes	7–6, 6–7, 6–3
Loss	2–3	1985	Tokyo Indoor, Japan	Carpet	(United States) Scott Davis	(United States) Ken Flach (United States) Robert Seguso	6–4, 3–6, 6–7
Win	3–3	1986	Philadelphia, U.S.	Carpet	(United States) Scott Davis	(Sweden) Stefan Edberg (Sweden) Anders Järryd	7–6, 3–6, 6–3, 7–5
Loss	3–4	1986	Scottsdale, U.S.	Hard	(United States) Scott Davis	(Mexico) Leonardo Lavalle (United States) Mike Leach	6–7, 4–6
Loss	3–5	1987	Lyon, France	Carpet	(United States) Kelly Jones	(France) Guy Forget (France) Yannick Noah	6–4, 3–6, 4–6
Win	4–5	1987	Los Angeles, U.S.	Hard	(United States) Kevin Curren	(United States) Brad Gilbert (United States) Tim Wilkison	6–3, 6–4
Loss	4–6	1987	Paris, France	Carpet	(United States) Scott Davis	(Switzerland) Jakob Hlasek (Switzerland) Claudio Mezzadri	6–7, 2–6
Loss	4–7	1987	Frankfurt, West Germany	Carpet	(United States) Scott Davis	(West Germany) Boris Becker (West Germany) Patrik Kühnen	4–6, 2–6
Win	5.	1987	Johannesburg, South Africa	Hard (i)	(United States) Kevin Curren	(United States) Eric Korita (United States) Brad Pearce	6–4, 6–4
Win	6.	1988	Memphis, U.S.	Hard (i)	(United States) Kevin Curren	(Sweden) Peter Lundgren (Sweden) Mikael Pernfors	6–2, 6–2
Loss	8.	1988	Tokyo Outdoor, Japan	Hard	(United States) Steve Denton	(Australia) John Fitzgerald (United States) Johan Kriek	4–6, 7–6, 4–6
Win	7.	1988	Johannesburg, South Africa	Hard (i)	(United States) Kevin Curren	(South Africa) Gary Muller (United States) Tim Wilkison	7–6, 6–4
Loss	9.	1989	Indian Wells, U.S.	Hard	(United States) Kevin Curren	(West Germany) Boris Becker (Switzerland) Jakob Hlasek	6–7, 5–7
Loss	10.	1989	Tokyo Outdoor, Japan	Hard	(United States) Kevin Curren	(United States) Ken Flach (United States) Robert Seguso	6–7, 6–7
Win	8.	1989	Sydney Indoor, Australia	Hard (i)	(United States) Scott Warner	(Australia) Darren Cahill (Australia) Mark Kratzmann	6–3, 6–7, 7–5
Win	9.	1989	Tokyo Indoor, Japan	Carpet	(United States) Kevin Curren	(Ecuador) Andrés Gómez (Socialist Federal Republic of Yugoslavia) Slobodan Živojinović	4–6, 6–3, 7–6
Win	10.	1990	Orlando, U.S.	Hard	(United States) Scott Davis	(Venezuela) Alfonso Mora (United States) Brian Page	6–3, 7–5
Win	11.	1990	Kiawah Island, U.S.	Clay	(United States) Scott Davis	(United States) Jim Grabb (Mexico) Leonardo Lavalle	6–2, 6–3
Win	12.	1990	Los Angeles, U.S.	Hard	(United States) Scott Davis	(Sweden) Peter Lundgren (Kenya) Paul Wekesa	3–6, 6–1, 6–3
Win	13.	1990	Indianapolis, U.S.	Hard	(United States) Scott Davis	(Canada) Grant Connell (Canada) Glenn Michibata	7–6, 7–6
Loss	11.	1990	Tokyo Indoor, Japan	Carpet	(United States) Scott Davis	(France) Guy Forget (Switzerland) Jakob Hlasek	6–7, 5–7
Loss	12.	1990	Lyon, France	Carpet	(United States) Jim Grabb	(United States) Patrick Galbraith (United States) Kelly Jones	6–7, 4–6
Win	14.	1990	Paris, France	Carpet	(United States) Scott Davis	(Australia) Darren Cahill (Australia) Mark Kratzmann	5–7, 6–3, 6–4
Win	15.	1991	Sydney Outdoor, Australia	Hard	(United States) Scott Davis	(Australia) Darren Cahill (Australia) Mark Kratzmann	3–6, 6–3, 6–2
Win	16.	1991	Australian Open, Melbourne	Hard	(United States) Scott Davis	(United States) Patrick McEnroe (United States) David Wheaton	6–7, 7–6, 6–3, 7–5
Win	17.	1991	Chicago, U.S.	Carpet	(United States) Scott Davis	(Canada) Grant Connell (Canada) Glenn Michibata	6–4, 5–7, 7–6
Loss	13.	1991	Tampa, U.S.	Clay	(United States) Richey Reneberg	(United States) Ken Flach (United States) Robert Seguso	7–6, 4–6, 1–6
Win	18.	1991	Washington, D.C., U.S.	Hard	(United States) Scott Davis	(United States) Ken Flach (United States) Robert Seguso	6–4, 6–2
Loss	14.	1991	U.S. Open, New York	Hard	(United States) Scott Davis	(Australia) John Fitzgerald (Sweden) Anders Järryd	3–6, 6–3, 3–6, 3–6
Loss	15.	1991	Tokyo Indoor, Japan	Carpet	(United States) Scott Davis	(United States) Jim Grabb (United States) Richey Reneberg	5–7, 6–2, 6–7
Loss	16.	1993	Osaka, Japan	Hard	(Canada) Glenn Michibata	(United States) Mark Keil (South Africa) Christo van Rensburg	6–7, 3–6
Loss	17.	1993	Tokyo Outdoor, Japan	Hard	(Canada) Glenn Michibata	(United States) Ken Flach (United States) Rick Leach	6–2, 3–6, 4–6
Loss	18.	1993	Montreal, Canada	Hard	(Canada) Glenn Michibata	(United States) Jim Courier (The Bahamas) Mark Knowles	4–6, 6–7

== Doubles performance timeline ==
Key
W	F	SF	QF	#R	RR	Q#	DNQ	A	NH

(W) winner; (F) finalist; (SF) semifinalist; (QF) quarterfinalist; (#R) rounds 4, 3, 2, 1; (RR) round-robin stage; (Q#) qualification round; (DNQ) did not qualify; (A) absent; (NH) not held; (SR) strike rate (events won / competed); (W–L) win–loss record.

Tournament	1981	1982	1983	1984	1985	1986	1987	1988	1989	1990	1991	1992	1993	1994	1995	1996	1997	1998	Career SR
Grand Slam tournaments
Australian Open	A	2R	3R	A	2R	NH	A	A	A	A	W	SF	2R	1R	2R	1R	A	A	1 / 9
French Open	A	A	A	1R	A	A	A	A	1R	1R	1R	1R	3R	QF	2R	A	A	A	0 / 8
Wimbledon	A	A	A	A	1R	1R	3R	A	3R	2R	3R	QF	2R	2R	2R	A	A	A	0 / 10
U.S. Open	1R	A	2R	1R	3R	2R	QF	QF	3R	1R	F	3R	1R	2R	1R	A	A	A	0 / 14
Grand Slam SR	0 / 1	0 / 1	0 / 2	0 / 2	0 / 3	0 / 2	0 / 2	0 / 1	0 / 3	0 / 3	1 / 4	0 / 4	0 / 4	0 / 4	0 / 4	0 / 1	0 / 0	0 / 0	1 / 41
ATP Masters Series
Indian Wells	These Tournaments Were Not Masters Series Events Before 1990									QF	QF	2R	2R	1R	A	A	A	A	0 / 5
Miami	These Tournaments Were Not Masters Series Events Before 1990									3R	QF	2R	1R	1R	2R	1R	A	A	0 / 7
Monte Carlo	These Tournaments Were Not Masters Series Events Before 1990									A	A	A	A	A	A	A	A	A	0 / 0
Rome	These Tournaments Were Not Masters Series Events Before 1990									A	A	A	A	A	A	A	A	A	0 / 0
Hamburg	These Tournaments Were Not Masters Series Events Before 1990									A	A	2R	A	A	A	A	A	A	0 / 1
Canada	These Tournaments Were Not Masters Series Events Before 1990									QF	QF	A	F	1R	1R	A	A	A	0 / 5
Cincinnati	These Tournaments Were Not Masters Series Events Before 1990									1R	SF	QF	QF	A	A	A	A	A	0 / 4
Madrid (Stuttgart)	These Tournaments Were Not Masters Series Events Before 1990									SF	2R	1R	1R	A	A	A	A	A	0 / 4
Paris	These Tournaments Were Not Masters Series Events Before 1990									W	2R	A	1R	A	A	A	A	A	1 / 3
Masters Series SR	N/A									1 / 6	0 / 6	0 / 5	0 / 6	0 / 3	0 / 2	0 / 1	0 / 0	0 / 0	1 / 29
Year-end ranking	N/A	240	178	86	21	34	15	12	20	6	3	81	48	93	132	214	1289	721	N/A
