= 1983 Lisbon Open – Singles =

Singles
- 1983 Lisbon Open

Final
- Champion: (Sweden) Mats Wilander
- Runner-up: (France) Yannick Noah
- Score: 2-6, 7-6, 6-4

Details
- Draw: 32
- Seeds: 8

Events
Singles	Doubles
Lisbon Open

The 1983 Lisbon Open – Singles was an event of the 1983 Lisbon Open men's tennis tournament held in Lisbon, Portugal from 4 April until 10 April 1983. The draw comprised 32 players and eight players were seeded. Second-seeded Mats Wilander won the singles title, defeating third-seeded Yannick Noah in the final, 2–6, 7–6, 6–4.

== Seeds ==
1. (Spain) José Higueras (semifinals)
2. (Sweden) Mats Wilander (champion)
3. (France) Yannick Noah (final)
4. (Ecuador) Andrés Gómez (second round)
5. (United States) Jimmy Arias (second round)
6. (Hungary) Balázs Taróczy (first round)
7. (Spain) Manuel Orantes (first round)
8. (Sweden) Henrik Sundström (second round)

== Draws ==
=== Key ===
- Q – Qualifier

=== Finals ===
Semifinals				Finals
1	(Spain) José Higueras	4	2
3	(France) Yannick Noah	6	6	3	(France) Yannick Noah	6	6	4
Q	(Czechoslovakia) Libor Pimek	2	3	2	(Sweden) Mats Wilander	2	7	6
2	(Sweden) Mats Wilander	6	6

=== Section 1 ===
First Round
1	(Spain) J Higueras	6	6
(Portugal) P Cordeiro	1	0
Q	(Uruguay) D Perez	6	4	6
(Spain) F Luna	3	6	0
(Germany) D Keretić	6	6
(Sweden) M Tideman	4	4
(Israel) S Glickstein	2	6	6
6	(Hungary) B Taróczy	6	4	3
3	(France) Y Noah	6	7
(Spain) J Aguilera	3	5
(Colombia) J Velasco Sr.	7	1	6
(Sweden) S Simonsson	5	6	3
(Italy) C Barazzutti	6	4	6
(Brazil) M Hocevar	4	6	3
(Sweden) H Simonsson	3	1
8	(Sweden) H Sundström	6	6

Second Round
1	(Spain) J Higueras	2	6	6
Q	(Uruguay) D Perez	6	1	3
(Germany) D Keretić	0	3
(Israel) S Glickstein	6	6
3	(France) Y Noah	7	7
(Colombia) J Velasco Sr.	5	5
(Italy) C Barazzutti	6	6	6
8	(Sweden) H Sundström	7	1	1

Quarterfinals
1	(Spain) J Higueras	7	6
(Israel) S Glickstein	5	0
3	(France) Y Noah	6	6
(Italy) C Barazzutti	2	4

Semifinals
1	(Spain) J Higueras	4	2
3	(France) Y Noah	6	6

=== Section 2 ===
First Round
7	(Spain) M Orantes	6	3	2
Q	(Czechoslovakia) L Pimek	2	6	6
(Czechoslovakia) P Složil	6	6
(Germany) W Popp	2	2
(Sweden) A Järryd	6	6
(Australia) P Cash	3	3
(Brazil) C Kirmayr	1	7	6
4	(Ecuador) Gómez	6	6	7
5	(United States) J Arias	3	7	6
(Bolivia) M Martinez	6	5	3
(France) G Forget	5	1
(Paraguay) V Pecci	7	6
Q	(Brazil) C Motta	6	2	7
(Switzerland) H Günthardt	2	6	5
(United States) H Solomon	6	2
2	(Sweden) M Wilander	7	6

Second Round
Q	(Czechoslovakia) L Pimek	6	6
(Czechoslovakia) P Složil	2	3
(Sweden) A Järryd	6	4	6
4	(Ecuador) Gómez	1	6	2
5	(United States) J Arias	6	2
(Paraguay) V Pecci	7	6
Q	(Brazil) C Motta	6	6	0
2	(Sweden) M Wilander	7	3	6

Quarterfinals
Q	(Czechoslovakia) L Pimek	6	6
(Sweden) A Järryd	2	2
(Paraguay) V Pecci	4	2
2	(Sweden) M Wilander	6	6

Semifinals
Q	(Czechoslovakia) L Pimek	2	3
2	(Sweden) M Wilander	6	6
