= 1983 Lisbon Open – Doubles =

Doubles
- 1983 Lisbon Open

Final
- Champion: (Brazil) Carlos Kirmayr (Brazil) Cássio Motta
- Runner-up: (Czechoslovakia) Pavel Složil (United States) Ferdi Taygan
- Score: 7–5, 6–4

Details
- Draw: 16
- Seeds: 4

Events
Singles	Doubles
Lisbon Open

The 1983 Lisbon Open – Doubles was an event of the 1983 Lisbon Open men's tennis tournament held in Lisbon, Portugal from 4 April until 10 April 1983. The draw comprised 16 players and four of them were seeded. Fourth-seeded Carlos Kirmayr and Cássio Motta won the doubles title, defeating first-seeded Pavel Složil and Ferdi Taygan in the final, 7–5, 6–4.

== Seeds ==
1. (Czechoslovakia) Pavel Složil / (United States) Ferdi Taygan (final)
2. (Switzerland) Heinz Günthardt / (Hungary) Balázs Taróczy (semifinals)
3. (Sweden) Anders Järryd / (Sweden) Hans Simonsson (quarterfinals)
4. (Brazil) Carlos Kirmayr / (Brazil) Cássio Motta (champions)

== Draw ==
=== Key ===
- Q = Qualifier
- WC = Wild card
- LL = Lucky loser
- Alt = Alternate
- SE = Special exempt
- PR = Protected ranking
- ITF = ITF entry
- JE = Junior exempt
- w/o = Walkover
- r = Retired
- d = Defaulted
- SR = Special ranking

First Round
1	(Czechoslovakia) Pavel Složil (United States) Ferdi Taygan	6	6
(Sweden) Henrik Sundström (Sweden) Jörgen Windahl	3	1
(Spain) José Higueras (Sweden) Mats Wilander	7	6	6
(Uruguay) José Luis Damiani (Uruguay) Diego Pérez	5	7	3
3	(Sweden) Anders Järryd (Sweden) Hans Simonsson	6	6
(Australia) Pat Cash (Australia) Wally Masur	3	2
(Sweden) Joakim Nyström (Sweden) Magnus Tideman	6	6
(Portugal) Pedro Cordeiro (Portugal) Jose Cordeiro	2	1
(Brazil) Marcos Hocevar (West Germany) Wolfgang Popp	6	2	6
(Sweden) Stefan Edberg (Sweden) Jan Gunnarsson	1	6	3
4	(Brazil) Carlos Kirmayr (Brazil) Cássio Motta	7	7
(Switzerland) Markus Günthardt (Switzerland) Jakob Hlasek	6	5
(Ecuador) Andrés Gómez (Ecuador) Raúl Viver	6	6
(Sweden) Per Hjertquist (Sweden) Stefan Simonsson	4	2
2	(Switzerland) Heinz Günthardt (Hungary) Balázs Taróczy	6	7
(West Germany) Stefan Hermann (West Germany) Damir Keretić	3	6

Quarterfinals
1	(Czechoslovakia) Pavel Složil (United States) Ferdi Taygan	6	6
(Spain) José Higueras (Sweden) Mats Wilander	3	1
3	(Sweden) Anders Järryd (Sweden) Hans Simonsson	4	6
(Sweden) Joakim Nyström (Sweden) Magnus Tideman	6	7
(Brazil) Marcos Hocevar (West Germany) Wolfgang Popp	3	7	3
4	(Brazil) Carlos Kirmayr (Brazil) Cássio Motta	6	6	6
(Ecuador) Andrés Gómez (Ecuador) Raúl Viver	3	7	5
2	(Switzerland) Heinz Günthardt (Hungary) Balázs Taróczy	6	5	7

Semifinals
1	(Czechoslovakia) Pavel Složil (United States) Ferdi Taygan	6	6
(Sweden) Joakim Nyström (Sweden) Magnus Tideman	4	1
4	(Brazil) Carlos Kirmayr (Brazil) Cássio Motta	6	4	6
2	(Switzerland) Heinz Günthardt (Hungary) Balázs Taróczy	2	6	3

Final
1	(Czechoslovakia) Pavel Složil (United States) Ferdi Taygan	5	4
4	(Brazil) Carlos Kirmayr (Brazil) Cássio Motta	7	6
