= 1983 Volvo International – Doubles =

Doubles
- 1983 Volvo International
- 1982 Champions: (United States) Sherwood Stewart (United States) Ferdi Taygan

Final
- Champions: (Australia) Mark Edmondson (United States) Sherwood Stewart
- Runners-up: (United States) Eric Fromm (United States) Drew Gitlin
- Score: 7–6, 6–1

Details
- Draw: 28
- Seeds: 8

Events
Singles	Doubles
← 1982 ·	Volvo International	· 1984 →

Sherwood Stewart and Ferdi Taygan were the defending champions but they competed with different partners that year, Stewart with Mark Edmondson and Taygan with Cássio Motta.

Motta and Taygan lost in the semifinals to Eric Fromm and Drew Gitlin.

Stewart and Edmondson won in the final 7–6, 6–1 against Fromm and Gitlin.

== Seeds ==
Champion seeds are indicated in bold text while text in italics indicates the round in which those seeds were eliminated. The top four seeded teams received byes into the second round.

1. (Australia) **Mark Edmondson** / (United States) **Sherwood Stewart (champions)**
2. (Brazil) Cássio Motta / (United States) Ferdi Taygan (semifinals)
3. (Paraguay) Francisco González / (Paraguay) Víctor Pecci (second round)
4. (France) Henri Leconte / (France) Gilles Moretton (second round)
5. (United States) Charles Buzz Strode / (United States) Van Winitsky (quarterfinals)
6. (Ecuador) Andrés Gómez / (Ecuador) Ricardo Ycaza (semifinals)
7. (Australia) David Graham / (Australia) Laurie Warder (quarterfinals)
8. (Sweden) Jan Gunnarsson / (United States) Mike Leach (second round)

== Draw ==
=== Key ===
- Q = Qualifier
- WC = Wild card
- LL = Lucky loser
- Alt = Alternate
- SE = Special exempt
- PR = Protected ranking
- ITF = ITF entry
- JE = Junior exempt
- w/o = Walkover
- r = Retired
- d = Defaulted
- SR = Special ranking

=== Finals ===
Final
1	(Australia) **Mark Edmondson** (United States) **Sherwood Stewart**	**7**	**6**
	(United States) Eric Fromm (United States) Drew Gitlin	6	1

=== Top half ===
First round
(France) **D Bedel** (France) **B Fritz**	3	**6**	**6**
(United States) G Donnelly (United States) R Seguso	**6**	4	3
(Puerto Rico) **E Fernández** (United States) **D Pate**	**7**	**6**
(Chile) J C Ayala (United States) J Mattke	6	0
(United States) E Adams (South Africa) B Pirow	6	2
8	(Sweden) **J Gunnarsson** (United States) **M Leach**	**7**	**6**
(South Africa) **R Venter** (United States) **B Willenborg**	**7**	6	**6**
(United States) J Kriek (United States) M Purcell	6	**7**	2
(United States) **J Arias** (United States) **R Hightower**	**6**	**6**
(Spain) J Higueras (Spain) M Orantes	4	2
(Peru) P Arraya (Sweden) H Sundström	**6**	0	4
6	(Ecuador) **A Gómez** (Ecuador) **R Ycaza**	3	**6**	**6**

Second round
1	(Australia) **M Edmondson** (United States) **S Stewart**	**6**	**7**
(France) D Bedel (France) B Fritz	3	6
(Puerto Rico) **E Fernández** (United States) **D Pate**	**6**	**6**
8	(Sweden) J Gunnarsson (United States) M Leach	3	3
3	(Paraguay) F González (Paraguay) V Pecci	**6**	4	3
(South Africa) **R Venter** (United States) **B Willenborg**	3	**6**	**6**
(United States) J Arias (United States) R Hightower	1	4
6	(Ecuador) **A Gómez** (Ecuador) **R Ycaza**	**6**	**6**

Quarterfinals
1	(Australia) **M Edmondson** (United States) **S Stewart**	**6**	4	**6**
(Puerto Rico) E Fernández (United States) D Pate	4	**6**	4
(South Africa) R Venter (United States) B Willenborg	2	2
6	(Ecuador) **A Gómez** (Ecuador) **R Ycaza**	**6**	**6**

Semifinals
1	(Australia) **M Edmondson** (United States) **S Stewart**	**6**	**7**
6	(Ecuador) A Gómez (Ecuador) R Ycaza	3	5

=== Bottom half ===
First round
5	(United States) **C B Strode** (United States) **V Winitsky**	**6**	**6**
(Argentina) R Cano (Chile) P Rebolledo	0	1
(United States) **B Gilbert** (United States) **J Gurfein**	**7**	5	**6**
(South Africa) M Myburg (South Africa) F Punčec	5	**7**	3
(United States) **E Fromm** (United States) **D Gitlin**	**7**	4	**6**
(Czechoslovakia) S Birner (Australia) C Miller	6	**6**	3
7	(Australia) **D Graham** (Australia) **L Warder**	**7**	**6**
(United States) J Levine (United States) T Warneke	6	3
(Spain) **L Fargas** (Spain) **G Urpí**	**7**	**6**
(Spain) A Tous (Colombia) J Velasco Sr.	6	4
(Uruguay) **J L Damiani** (Uruguay) **D Pérez**	**6**	**7**
(Hungary) Z Kuharszky (Italy) C Panatta	4	5

Second round
5	(United States) **C B Strode** (United States) **V Winitsky**	**6**	3	**6**
(United States) B Gilbert (United States) J Gurfein	4	**6**	1
(United States) **E Fromm** (United States) **D Gitlin**	3	**6**	**6**
4	(France) H Leconte (France) G Moretton	**6**	3	2
7	(Australia) **D Graham** (Australia) **L Warder**	**6**	**6**
(Spain) L Fargas (Spain) G Urpí	3	3
(Uruguay) J L Damiani (Uruguay) **D Pérez**	1	2
2	(Brazil) **C Motta** (United States) **F Taygan**	**6**	**6**

Quarterfinals
5	(United States) C B Strode (United States) V Winitsky	6	6
(United States) **E Fromm** (United States) **D Gitlin**	**7**	**7**
7	(Australia) D Graham (Australia) L Warder	5	0
2	(Brazil) **C Motta** (United States) **F Taygan**	**7**	**6**

Semifinals
(United States) **E Fromm** (United States) **D Gitlin**	**6**	1	**7**
2	(Brazil) C Motta (United States) F Taygan	2	**6**	6
