= 1983 Lisbon Open =

- Date: 4–10 April
- Edition: Only
- Category: Grand Prix (Super Series)
- Draw: 32S / 16D
- Prize money: $250,000
- Surface: Clay / outdoor
- Location: Lisbon, Portugal

Champions

Singles
- (Sweden) Mats Wilander

Doubles
- (Brazil) Carlos Kirmayr / (Brazil) Cássio Motta
- Lisbon Open

The 1983 Lisbon Open, also known by its sponsorship name Lights Cup, was a men's tennis tournament held in Lisbon, Portugal and played on outdoor clay courts. It was the only edition of the tournament and was held from 4 April to 10 April 1983. It was part of the Grand Prix tennis circuit as a Super Series category event. Second-seeded Mats Wilander won the singles title.

== Finals ==
=== Singles ===
(Sweden) Mats Wilander defeated (France) Yannick Noah 2–6, 7–6, 6–4

- It was Wilander's 2nd singles title of the year and the 6th of his career.

=== Doubles ===
(Brazil) Carlos Kirmayr / (Brazil) Cássio Motta defeated (Czechoslovakia) Pavel Složil / (United States) Ferdi Taygan 7–5, 6–4
