= 1984 Volvo International – Doubles =

Doubles
- 1984 Volvo International
- 1983 Champions: (Australia) Mark Edmondson (United States) Sherwood Stewart

Final
- Champions: (United States) Brian Gottfried (Czechoslovakia) Tomáš Šmíd
- Runners-up: (Brazil) Cássio Motta (United States) Blaine Willenborg
- Score: 6–4, 6–2

Details
- Draw: 32
- Seeds: 8

Events
Singles	Doubles
- Volvo International

Mark Edmondson and Sherwood Stewart were the defending champions but lost in the semifinals to Brian Gottfried and Tomáš Šmíd.

Gottfried and Šmíd won in the final 6–4, 6–2 against Cássio Motta and Blaine Willenborg.

== Seeds ==
Champion seeds are indicated in bold text while text in italics indicates the round in which those seeds were eliminated.

1. (Australia) Mark Edmondson / (United States) Sherwood Stewart (semifinals)
2. (Czechoslovakia) Pavel Složil / (United States) Ferdi Taygan (quarterfinals)
3. (Switzerland) Heinz Günthardt / (Hungary) Balázs Taróczy (quarterfinals)
4. (United States) Ken Flach / (United States) Robert Seguso (second round)
5. (Australia) David Graham / (Australia) Laurie Warder (first round)
6. (Brazil) Cássio Motta / (United States) Blaine Willenborg (final)
7. (Australia) Peter Doohan / (Australia) Michael Fancutt (second round)
8. (Australia) Broderick Dyke / (New Zealand) Chris Lewis (second round)

== Draw ==
Key

- Q = Qualifier
- WC = Wild card
- LL = Lucky loser
- Alt = Alternate
- ITF = ITF entry
- PR = Protected ranking
- SR = Special ranking
- SE = Special exempt
- JE = Junior exempt
- JR = Junior Accelerator Programme entrant
- CO = College Accelerator Programme entrant
- NG = Next Gen Accelerator Program entrant
- w/o = Walkover
- r = Retired
- d = Defaulted

=== Final ===
Final
	(United States) **Brian Gottfried** (Czechoslovakia) **Tomáš Šmíd**	**6**	**6**
6	(Brazil) Cássio Motta (United States) Blaine Willenborg	4	2

=== Top half ===
First round
1	(Australia) **M Edmondson** (United States) **S Stewart**	**7**	**6**
(Hungary) Z Kuhárszky (Italy) C Panatta	6	4
(United States) M Dickson (United States) D Gitlin	4	4
(New Zealand) **M Lewis** (New Zealand) **D Mustard**	**6**	**6**
(Australia) C Johnstone (Australia) C Miller	1	**7**	4
(Sweden) **J Nyström** (Sweden) **S Simonsson**	**6**	5	**6**
(Chile) **R Acuña** (Chile) **A Fillol**	5	**7**	**6**
5	(Australia) D Graham (Australia) L Warder	**7**	5	4
4	(United States) **K Flach** (United States) **R Seguso**	**6**	**6**
(Romania) I Țiriac (Argentina) G Vilas	1	4
(United States) M Freeman (United States) T Wilkison	**6**	4	1
(Ecuador) **A Gómez** (United States) **M Purcell**	4	**6**	**6**
(United States) **B Gottfried** (Czechoslovakia) **T Šmíd**	**6**	6	**6**
(United States) B Nealon (United States) E Van't Hof	1	**7**	2
(Israel) S Glickstein (Israel) S Perkiss	**6**	6	4
8	(Australia) **B Dyke** (New Zealand) **C Lewis**	3	**7**	**6**

Second round
1	(Australia) **M Edmondson** (United States) **S Stewart**	**7**	**6**
(New Zealand) M Lewis (New Zealand) D Mustard	5	3
(Sweden) J Nyström (Sweden) S Simonsson	4	4
(Chile) **R Acuña** (Chile) **A Fillol**	**6**	**6**
4	(United States) K Flach (United States) R Seguso	6	2
(Ecuador) **A Gómez** (United States) **M Purcell**	**7**	**6**
(United States) **B Gottfried** (Czechoslovakia) **T Šmíd**	**6**	**6**
8	(Australia) B Dyke (New Zealand) C Lewis	4	4

Quarterfinals
1	(Australia) **M Edmondson** (United States) **S Stewart**	**7**	**6**
(Chile) R Acuña (Chile) A Fillol	6	4
(Ecuador) A Gómez (United States) M Purcell	6	4
(United States) **B Gottfried** (Czechoslovakia) **T Šmíd**	**7**	**6**

Semifinals
1	(Australia) M Edmondson (United States) S Stewart	2	6
(United States) **B Gottfried** (Czechoslovakia) **T Šmíd**	**6**	**7**

=== Bottom half ===
First round
6	(Brazil) **C Motta** (United States) **B Willenborg**	**6**	**6**
(Spain) J Higueras (Spain) G Urpí	4	4
(United States) **C B Cox** (United States) **M Flur**	**6**	3	**7**
(Brazil) N Aerts (Brazil) M Hocevar	3	**6**	6
(Peru) **P Arraya** (United States) **E Fromm**	**6**	2	**6**
(United States) T Delatte (Australia) B Drewett	1	**6**	1
(West Germany) W Popp (South Africa) D Tarr	3	2
3	(Switzerland) **H Günthardt** (Hungary) **B Taróczy**	**6**	**6**
7	(Australia) **P Doohan** (Australia) **M Fancutt**	3	**6**	**6**
(Puerto Rico) E Fernández (United States) R Leach	**6**	3	4
(United States) J Gurfein (Spain) F Soler	3	3
(United States) **G Donnelly** (Czechoslovakia) **L Pimek**	**6**	**6**
(Spain) **J Aguilera** (Spain) **A Tous**	**6**	**6**
(United States) A Krickstein (Socialist Federal Republic of Yugoslavia) M Ostoja	3	1
(United States) D Saltz (United States) C B Strode	2	4
2	(Czechoslovakia) **P Složil** (United States) **F Taygan**	**6**	**6**

Second round
6	(Brazil) **C Motta** (United States) **B Willenborg**	**7**	**7**
(United States) C B Cox (United States) M Flur	6	5
(Peru) P Arraya (United States) E Fromm	**6**	2	0
3	(Switzerland) **H Günthardt** (Hungary) **B Taróczy**	3	**6**	**6**
7	(Australia) P Doohan (Australia) M Fancutt	6	0
(United States) **G Donnelly** (Czechoslovakia) **L Pimek**	**7**	**6**
(Spain) J Aguilera (Spain) A Tous	6	3
2	(Czechoslovakia) **P Složil** (United States) **F Taygan**	**7**	**6**

Quarterfinals
6	(Brazil) **C Motta** (United States) **B Willenborg**	**6**	4	**6**
3	(Switzerland) H Günthardt (Hungary) B Taróczy	2	**6**	1
(United States) **G Donnelly** (Czechoslovakia) **L Pimek**	**6**	**7**
2	(Czechoslovakia) P Složil (United States) F Taygan	4	5

Semifinals
6	(Brazil) **C Motta** (United States) **B Willenborg**	**7**	**6**
(United States) G Donnelly (Czechoslovakia) L Pimek	6	4
