= 1984 Volvo International – Singles =

Singles
- 1984 Volvo International

Final
- Champion: (Sweden) Joakim Nyström
- Runner-up: (United States) Tim Wilkison
- Score: 6–2, 7–5

Details
- Draw: 64
- Seeds: 16

Events
| Singles | Doubles |
| ← 1983 · | Volvo International | · 1985 → |

José Luis Clerc was the defending champion but did not compete that year.

Joakim Nyström won in the final 6–2, 7–5 against Tim Wilkison.

== Seeds ==
A champion seed is indicated in bold text while text in italics indicates the round in which that seed was eliminated.

1. (Ecuador) Andrés Gómez (quarterfinals)
2. (Sweden) Henrik Sundström (first round)
3. (Czechoslovakia) Tomáš Šmíd (first round)
4. (United States) Aaron Krickstein (first round)
5. (Spain) Juan Aguilera (semifinals)
6. n/a
7. (Argentina) Guillermo Vilas (first round)
8. (Sweden) **Joakim Nyström (champion)**
9. (Spain) José Higueras (third round)
10. (United States) Mel Purcell (first round)
11. (Switzerland) Heinz Günthardt (third round)
12. (Czechoslovakia) Libor Pimek (third round)
13. (Italy) Francesco Cancellotti (quarterfinals)
14. (United States) Mark Dickson (first round)
15. (Uruguay) Diego Pérez (second round)
16. (Spain) Fernando Luna (first round)

== Draw ==
=== Key ===
- Q = Qualifier
- WC = Wild card
- LL = Lucky loser
- Alt = Alternate
- SE = Special exempt
- PR = Protected ranking
- ITF = ITF entry
- JE = Junior exempt
- w/o = Walkover
- r = Retired
- d = Defaulted
- SR = Special ranking

=== Finals ===
Semifinals
5 | (Spain) Juan Aguilera | **6** | 1 | 4
8 | (Sweden) **Joakim Nyström** | 2 | **6** | **6**
(United States) **Tim Wilkison** | **7** | **6**
(Paraguay) Víctor Pecci | 5 | 4

Final
8 | (Sweden) **Joakim Nyström** | **6** | **7**
(United States) Tim Wilkison | 2 | 5

=== Top half ===
==== Section 1 ====
First round
1 | (Ecuador) **A Gómez** | **6** | **6**
(France) T Tulasne | 3 | 4
Q | (Argentina) G Rivas | 4 | 1
(Chile) **P Rebolledo** | **6** | **6**
(United States) M Freeman | 2 | 4
(Peru) **P Arraya** | **6** | **6**
(United States) E Fromm | 3 | 2
12 | (Czechoslovakia) **L Pimek** | **6** | **6**
16 | (Spain) F Luna | 6 | 3
Q | (United States) **L Duncan** | **7** | **6**
(Socialist Federal Republic of Yugoslavia) **M Ostoja** | **7** | 2 | **7**
(Australia) B Drewett | 6 | **6** | 6
(Hungary) **B Taróczy** | **7** | **7**
(United States) R Seguso | 5 | 6
(Portugal) M Soares | 6 | 4
5 | (Spain) **J Aguilera** | **7** | **6**

Second round
1 | (Ecuador) **A Gómez** | **6** | 4 | **6**
(Chile) P Rebolledo | 3 | **6** | 1
(Peru) P Arraya | 2 | 0^{r}
12 | (Czechoslovakia) **L Pimek** | **6** | 3
Q | (United States) **L Duncan** | **7** | **6**
(Socialist Federal Republic of Yugoslavia) M Ostoja | 5 | 3
(Hungary) B Taróczy | 2 | 2
5 | (Spain) **J Aguilera** | **6** | **6**

Third round
1 | (Ecuador) **A Gómez** | **6** | **7**
12 | (Czechoslovakia) L Pimek | 2 | 5
Q | (United States) L Duncan | 5 | 2
5 | (Spain) **J Aguilera** | **7** | **6**

Quarterfinals
1 | (Ecuador) A Gómez | 2 | **7** | 3
5 | (Spain) **J Aguilera** | **6** | 5 | **6**

==== Section 2 ====
First round
3 | (Czechoslovakia) T Šmíd | 6 | 6
Q | (Argentina) **A Ganzábal** | **7** | **7**
(South Africa) **D Tarr** | **6** | **6**
(Chile) R Acuña | 4 | 4
(United States) **B Gottfried** | **6** | **7**
(United States) B Nealon | 2 | 5
(India) R Krishnan | 6 | 4
13 | (Italy) **F Cancellotti** | **7** | **6**
9 | (Spain) **J Higueras** | **7** | **7**
(United States) J Brown | 6 | 5
(New Zealand) **C Lewis** | **6** | **6**
(United States) J Gurfein | 3 | 3
(Australia) T Allan | 3 | 3
(United States) **M Flur** | **6** | **6**
(United States) T Farnsworth | 3 | 0
8 | (Sweden) **J Nyström** | **6** | **6**

Second round
Q | (Argentina) **A Ganzábal** | 3 | **7** | **6**
(South Africa) D Tarr | **6** | 6 | 1
(United States) B Gottfried | 6 | 1
13 | (Italy) **F Cancellotti** | **7** | **6**
9 | (Spain) **J Higueras** | 2 | **6** | **6**
(New Zealand) C Lewis | **6** | 1 | 1
(United States) M Flur | **6** | 1 | 2
8 | (Sweden) **J Nyström** | 4 | **6** | **6**

Third round
Q | (Argentina) A Ganzábal | 3 | 4
13 | (Italy) **F Cancellotti** | **6** | **6**
9 | (Spain) J Higueras | 5 | 3
8 | (Sweden) **J Nyström** | **7** | **6**

Quarterfinals
13 | (Italy) F Cancellotti | **7** | 4 | 6
8 | (Sweden) **J Nyström** | 5 | **6** | **7**

=== Bottom half ===
==== Section 3 ====
First round
LL | (Spain) J Arrese | 2 | 4
(Brazil) **C Motta** | **6** | **6**
(Chile) A Fillol | 1 | **6** | 2
(Argentina) **R Argüello** | **6** | 2 | **6**
(New Zealand) **D Mustard** | **6** | **7**
(Argentina) M Jaite | 3 | 5
(United States) **T Wilkison** | 4 | **6** | **6**
10 | (United States) M Purcell | **6** | 2 | 1
14 | (United States) M Dickson | 2 | 3
(United States) **M Leach** | **6** | **6**
(Brazil) **M Hocevar** | **6** | 3 | **6**
(Czechoslovakia) M Mečíř | 4 | **6** | 4
(Spain) **A Tous** | **6** | **6**
(Italy) C Panatta | 2 | 1
(United States) **J Lapidus** | **6** | **6**
4 | (United States) A Krickstein | 4 | 2

Second round
(Brazil) C Motta | 2 | 4
(Argentina) **R Argüello** | **6** | **6**
(New Zealand) D Mustard | **6** | 4 | 0
(United States) **T Wilkison** | 4 | **6** | **6**
(United States) M Leach | 3 | **6** | 1
(Brazil) **M Hocevar** | **6** | 4 | **6**
(Spain) A Tous | 3 | 2
(United States) **J Lapidus** | **6** | **6**

Third round
(Argentina) R Argüello | 5 | 0
(United States) **T Wilkison** | **7** | **6**
(Brazil) M Hocevar | 4 | 6
(United States) **J Lapidus** | **6** | **7**

Quarterfinals
(United States) **T Wilkison** | **6** | **6**
(United States) J Lapidus | 0 | 2

==== Section 4 ====
First round
7 | (Argentina) G Vilas | 3 | 6
(United States) **B Willenborg** | **6** | **7**
(Sweden) **S Simonsson** | **6** | **6**
(Hungary) Z Kuharszky | 0 | 4
Q | (United States) H Solomon | **6** | 6 | 0^{r}
Q | (West Germany) **W Popp** | 4 | **7** | 1
(Czechoslovakia) P Složil | 5 | **6** | 4
11 | (Switzerland) **H Günthardt** | **7** | 4 | **6**
15 | (Uruguay) **D Pérez** | **6** | **6**
Q | (United States) J Levine | 4 | 1
(Paraguay) **V Pecci** | **6** | **6**
Q | (Sweden) H Simonsson | 4 | 3
Q | (Australia) C Johnstone | **6** | 4 | 2
Q | (Spain) **G Urpí** | 4 | **6** | **6**
(Israel) **S Glickstein** | **7** | **6**
2 | (Sweden) H Sundström | 6 | 4

Second round
(United States) **B Willenborg** | 4 | **6** | **6**
(Sweden) S Simonsson | **6** | 3 | 1
Q | (West Germany) W Popp | 1 | 3
11 | (Switzerland) **H Günthardt** | **6** | **6**
15 | (Uruguay) D Pérez | 2 | **6** | 1
(Paraguay) **V Pecci** | **6** | 4 | **6**
Q | (Spain) G Urpí | **6** | 0 | 5
(Israel) **S Glickstein** | 2 | **6** | **7**

Third round
(United States) **B Willenborg** | **7** | **6**
11 | (Switzerland) H Günthardt | 6 | 0
(Paraguay) **V Pecci** | **6** | **6**
(Israel) S Glickstein | 2 | 1

Quarterfinals
(United States) B Willenborg | **7** | 4 | 5
(Paraguay) **V Pecci** | 5 | **6** | **7**
