= 1981 Volvo International – Singles =

Singles
- 1981 Volvo International

Final
- Champion: (Argentina) José Luis Clerc
- Runner-up: (Argentina) Guillermo Vilas
- Score: 6–3, 6–2

Details
- Draw: 64
- Seeds: 16

Events
Singles	Doubles
← 1980 ·	Volvo International	· 1982 →

Jimmy Connors was the defending champion but lost in the third round to José Higueras.

José Luis Clerc won in the final 6–3, 6–2 against Guillermo Vilas.

== Seeds ==
A champion seed is indicated in bold text while text in italics indicates the round in which that seed was eliminated.

1. (United States) Jimmy Connors (third round)
2. (Czechoslovakia) Ivan Lendl (semifinals)
3. (Argentina) **José Luis Clerc (champion)**
4. (Argentina) Guillermo Vilas (final)
5. (Australia) Peter McNamara (third round)
6. (United States) Roscoe Tanner (second round)
7. (United States) Harold Solomon (quarterfinals)
8. (United States) Eliot Teltscher (semifinals)
9. (South Africa) Johan Kriek (third round)
10. (United States) Mel Purcell (third round)
11. (Spain) José Higueras (quarterfinals)
12. (United States) Eddie Dibbs (quarterfinals)
13. (Chile) Hans Gildemeister (third round)
14. (Uruguay) José Luis Damiani (third round)
15. (United States) Terry Moor (first round)
16. (Italy) Corrado Barazzutti (first round)

== Draw ==
=== Key ===
- Q = Qualifier
- WC = Wild card
- LL = Lucky loser
- Alt = Alternate
- SE = Special exempt
- PR = Protected ranking
- ITF = ITF entry
- JE = Junior exempt
- w/o = Walkover
- r = Retired
- d = Defaulted
- SR = Special ranking

=== Finals ===
Semifinals
8	(United States) Eliot Teltscher	6	1
4	(Argentina) **Guillermo Vilas**	**7**	**6**
3	(Argentina) **José Luis Clerc**	6	**6**	**6**
2	(Czechoslovakia) Ivan Lendl	**7**	4	4

Final
4	(Argentina) Guillermo Vilas	3	2
3	(Argentina) **José Luis Clerc**	**6**	**6**

=== Top half ===
==== Section 1 ====
First round
1	(United States) **J Connors**	**6**	**6**
Q	(Finland) L Palin	2	2
(United States) **V Van Patten**	**6**	**6**
(Chile) J Fernández	3	3
(Spain) **Á Giménez**	**6**	**6**
Q	(United States) D Dowlen	2	4
Q	(United States) S Denton	3	3
11	(Spain) **J Higueras**	**6**	**6**
9	(South Africa) **J Kriek**	**6**	**6**
Q	(United States) M Grant	1	3
(France) G Moretton	4	3
(France) **T Tulasne**	**6**	**6**
(South Africa) **K Curren**	**6**	**6**
(United States) H Pfister	4	3
(New Zealand) C Lewis	6	1
8	(United States) **E Teltscher**	**7**	**6**

Second round
1	(United States) **J Connors**	**6**	**6**
(United States) V Van Patten	0	4
(Spain) Á Giménez	3	2
11	(Spain) **J Higueras**	**6**	**6**
9	(South Africa) **J Kriek**	**6**	**6**
(France) T Tulasne	3	0
(South Africa) K Curren	3	3
8	(United States) **E Teltscher**	**6**	**6**

Third round
1	(United States) J Connors	4	1
11	(Spain) **J Higueras**	**6**	**6**
9	(South Africa) J Kriek	2	2
8	(United States) **E Teltscher**	**6**	**6**

Quarterfinals
11	(Spain) J Higueras	4	1
8	(United States) **E Teltscher**	**6**	**6**

==== Section 2 ====
First round
4	(Argentina) **G Vilas**	5	**6**	**6**
(United States) R Fagel	**7**	4	4
(France) **C Freyss**	**7**	**6**
(Ecuador) A Gómez	6	4
(Sweden) P Hjertquist	1	3
(United States) **J Delaney**	**6**	**6**
(United States) G Hardie	2	4
13	(Chile) **H Gildemeister**	**6**	**6**
16	(Italy) C Barazzutti	4	4
(Czechoslovakia) **P Složil**	**6**	**6**
(United States) E van Dillen	6	**6**	4
Q	(United States) **J Lapidus**	**7**	3	**6**
(Spain) G Urpí	2	0
(Spain) **J López-Maeso**	**6**	**6**
(Socialist Federal Republic of Yugoslavia) M Ostoja	2	**6**	2
6	(United States) **R Tanner**	**6**	4	**6**

Second round
4	(Argentina) **G Vilas**	**6**	**6**
(France) C Freyss	2	4
(United States) J Delaney	3	0
13	(Chile) **H Gildemeister**	**6**	**6**
(Czechoslovakia) **P Složil**	**6**	**6**
Q	(United States) J Lapidus	3	2
(Spain) **J López-Maeso**	3	**6**	**6**
6	(United States) R Tanner	**6**	3	4

Third round
4	(Argentina) **G Vilas**	**7**	**6**
13	(Chile) H Gildemeister	6	4
(Czechoslovakia) **P Složil**	**6**	**6**
(Spain) J López-Maeso	2	1

Quarterfinals
4	(Argentina) **G Vilas**	**6**	4	**6**
(Czechoslovakia) P Složil	2	**6**	2

=== Bottom half ===
==== Section 3 ====
First round
5	(Australia) **P McNamara**	**6**	**6**
(Australia) D Carter	4	2
Q	(France) **B Fritz**	**6**	**7**
(Brazil) M Hocevar	3	5
(Czechoslovakia) **S Birner**	**7**	**6**
(Chile) A Fillol	5	3
(United States) C B Strode	3	3
12	(United States) **E Dibbs**	**6**	**6**
10	(United States) **M Purcell**	**6**	**6**
(United States) A Kohlberg	4	4
(Switzerland) H Günthardt	5	1
(Paraguay) **F González**	**7**	**6**
(United States) C Mayotte	0	0^{r}
Q	(United States) **G Holroyd**	**6**	1
(France) P Portes	6	2
3	(Argentina) **J L Clerc**	**7**	**6**

Second round
5	(Australia) **P McNamara**	**6**	**6**
Q	(France) B Fritz	3	2
(Czechoslovakia) S Birner	3	**6**	2
12	(United States) **E Dibbs**	**6**	4	**6**
10	(United States) **M Purcell**	**6**	**6**
(Paraguay) F González	4	2
Q	(United States) G Holroyd	4	2
3	(Argentina) **J L Clerc**	**6**	**6**

Third round
5	(Australia) P McNamara	**6**	1	6
12	(United States) **E Dibbs**	2	**6**	**7**
10	(United States) M Purcell	2	2
3	(Argentina) **J L Clerc**	**6**	**6**

Quarterfinals
12	(United States) E Dibbs	6	1
3	(Argentina) **J L Clerc**	**7**	**6**

==== Section 4 ====
First round
7	(United States) **H Solomon**	**6**	**6**
(Chile) B Prajoux	2	0
(Argentina) E Bengoechea	**6**	4	5
(Uruguay) **D Pérez**	2	**6**	**7**
Q	(United States) T Delatte	2	6
(Chile) **P Rebolledo**	**6**	**7**
(Argentina) **F Dalla Fontana**	**6**	3	**6**
15	(United States) T Moor	4	**6**	3
14	(Uruguay) **J L Damiani**	**7**	**6**
(United States) F Taygan	6	3
(Argentina) **R Cano**	**6**	**6**
(Ecuador) R Ycaza	4	3
(Sweden) J Norbäck	2	**7**	2
(Bolivia) **M Martinez**	**6**	6	**6**
(United States) W Blaze	5	4
2	(Czechoslovakia) **I Lendl**	**7**	**6**

Second round
7	(United States) **H Solomon**	5
(Uruguay) D Pérez	5^{r}
(Chile) **P Rebolledo**	**6**	**6**
(Argentina) F Dalla Fontana	2	0
14	(Uruguay) **J L Damiani**	**6**	**6**
(Argentina) R Cano	4	1
(Bolivia) M Martinez	3	1
2	(Czechoslovakia) **I Lendl**	**6**	**6**

Third round
7	(United States) H Solomon	4	1
(Chile) **P Rebolledo**	**6**	**6**
14	(Uruguay) J L Damiani	4	4
2	(Czechoslovakia) **I Lendl**	**6**	**6**

Quarterfinals
(Chile) P Rebolledo	3	2
2	(Czechoslovakia) **I Lendl**	**6**	**6**
