= 1983 Volvo International – Singles =

Singles
- 1983 Volvo International

Final
- Champion: (Argentina) José Luis Clerc
- Runner-up: (Ecuador) Andrés Gómez
- Score: 6–3, 6–1

Details
- Draw: 56
- Seeds: 16

Events
| Singles | Doubles |
| ← 1982 · | Volvo International | · 1984 → |

Ivan Lendl was the defending champion but did not compete that year.

José Luis Clerc won in the final 6–3, 6–1 against Andrés Gómez.

== Seeds ==
A champion seed is indicated in bold text while text in italics indicates the round in which that seed was eliminated. The top eight seeds received a bye to the second round.

1. (Spain) José Higueras (semifinals)
2. (Argentina) Guillermo Vilas (quarterfinals)
3. (Argentina) **José Luis Clerc (champion)**
4. (United States) Jimmy Arias (semifinals)
5. (United States) Johan Kriek (second round)
6. (Sweden) Henrik Sundström (third round)
7. (France) Henri Leconte (third round)
8. (New Zealand) Chris Lewis (second round)
9. (Ecuador) Andrés Gómez (final)
10. (United States) Mel Purcell (quarterfinals)
11. (Italy) Corrado Barazzutti (third round)
12. (Peru) Pablo Arraya (first round)
13. (Paraguay) Víctor Pecci (first round)
14. (Uruguay) Diego Pérez (second round)
15. (Spain) Manuel Orantes (second round)
16. (Spain) Fernando Luna (third round)

== Draw ==
=== Key ===
- Q = Qualifier
- WC = Wild card
- LL = Lucky loser
- Alt = Alternate
- SE = Special exempt
- PR = Protected ranking
- ITF = ITF entry
- JE = Junior exempt
- w/o = Walkover
- r = Retired
- d = Defaulted
- SR = Special ranking

=== Finals ===
Semifinals
1 | (Spain) José Higueras | 5 | 1
3 | (Argentina) **José Luis Clerc** | **7** | **6**
4 | (United States) Jimmy Arias | 3 | 2
9 | (Ecuador) **Andrés Gómez** | **6** | **6**

Final
3 | (Argentina) **José Luis Clerc** | **6** | **6**
9 | (Ecuador) Andrés Gómez | 3 | 1

=== Top half ===
==== Section 1 ====
First round
(Australia) C Miller | 4 | 4
(Sweden) **J Gunnarsson** | **6** | **6**
(United States) **V Winitsky** | **6** | **6**
(Colombia) J Velasco Sr. | 2 | 2
Q | (Spain) G Urpí | 2 | 4
16 | (Spain) **F Luna** | **6** | **6**
10 | (United States) **M Purcell** | **6** | 4 | **6**
Q | (Ecuador) R Ycaza | 3 | **6** | 1
(United States) E Fromm | **6** | 4 | 3
(Argentina) **A Ganzábal** | 4 | **6** | **6**
(United States) G Holmes | 5 | **6** | 3
(Italy) **C Panatta** | **7** | 4 | **6**

Second round
1 | (Spain) **J Higueras** | **6** | **6**
(Sweden) J Gunnarsson | 3 | 1
(United States) V Winitsky | 3 | **6** | 6
16 | (Spain) **F Luna** | **6** | 3 | 6
10 | (United States) **M Purcell** | **7** | 3 | **6**
(Argentina) A Ganzábal | 5 | **6** | 2
(Italy) **C Panatta** | **6** | 3 | **6**
5 | (United States) J Kriek | 3 | **6** | 1

Third round
1 | (Spain) **J Higueras** | **6** | **7**
16 | (Spain) F Luna | 3 | 6
10 | (United States) **M Purcell** | **6** | 3 | **6**
(Italy) C Panatta | 3 | **6** | 0

Quarterfinals
1 | (Spain) **J Higueras** | **7** | **6**
10 | (United States) M Purcell | 5 | 4

==== Section 2 ====
First round
(South Africa) **R Venter** | **7** | **6**
(France) D Bedel | 5 | 3
(Argentina) C Castellan | 2 | 4
(Spain) **J Aguilera** | **6** | **6**
Q | (Chile) **B Prajoux** | 2 | **6** | **6**
12 | (Peru) P Arraya | **6** | 4 | 3
14 | (Uruguay) **D Pérez** | **6** | **6**
(Brazil) C Motta | 3 | 0
(United States) **J Gurfein** | 2 | **7** | **6**
(France) B Fritz | **6** | 6 | 1
(United States) **J Mattke** | **6** | **6**
(Chile) M Rodríguez | 2 | 2

Second round
3 | (Argentina) **J L Clerc** | **6** | **6**
(South Africa) R Venter | 2 | 3
(Spain) **J Aguilera** | **6** | **6**
Q | (Chile) B Prajoux | 1 | 4
14 | (Uruguay) D Pérez | 3 | 1
(United States) **J Gurfein** | **6** | **6**
(United States) J Mattke | 3 | 1
7 | (France) **H Leconte** | **6** | **6**

Third round
3 | (Argentina) **J L Clerc** | **6** | **6**
(Spain) J Aguilera | 3 | 2
(United States) **J Gurfein** | **7** | **7**
7 | (France) H Leconte | 5 | 6

Quarterfinals
3 | (Argentina) **J L Clerc** | **6** | **6**
(United States) J Gurfein | 3 | 2

=== Bottom half ===
==== Section 3 ====
First round
(United States) **J Brown** | **6** | **7**
(France) G Forget | 4 | 5
(United States) **E Dibbs** | **6** | **6**
(United States) D Gitlin | 4 | 0
(Italy) F Cancellotti | 3 | 5
15 | (Spain) **M Orantes** | **6** | **7**
11 | (Italy) **C Barazzutti** | **6** | **6**
(Hungary) Z Kuharszky | 1 | 0
(France) **G Moretton** | 6 | **6** | **7**
(West Germany) D Keretić | **7** | 2 | 6
(Spain) A Tous | 6 | **7** | 2
(Italy) **G Ocleppo** | **7** | 6 | **6**

Second round
8 | (New Zealand) C Lewis | 2 | 3
(United States) **J Brown** | **6** | **6**
(United States) **E Dibbs** | **6** | 2 | **6**
15 | (Spain) M Orantes | 1 | **6** | 4
11 | (Italy) **C Barazzutti** | **6** | 5 | **6**
(France) G Moretton | 1 | **7** | 3
(Italy) G Ocleppo | 4 | **7** | 6
4 | (United States) **J Arias** | **6** | 6 | **7**

Third round
(United States) **J Brown** | **6** | **6**
(United States) E Dibbs | 2 | 4
11 | (Italy) C Barazzutti | 5 | 5
4 | (United States) **J Arias** | **7** | **7**

Quarterfinals
(United States) J Brown | 2 | 0
4 | (United States) **J Arias** | **6** | **6**

==== Section 4 ====
First round
(France) **T Tulasne** | **6** | **6**
(United States) H Solomon | 1 | 4
(United States) J Van Nostrand | 1 | **6** | 3
Q | (Spain) **L Fargas** | **6** | 4 | **6**
(Spain) J Avendaño | **6** | 3 | 4
9 | (Ecuador) **A Gómez** | 2 | **6** | **6**
13 | (Paraguay) V Pecci | 3 | **6** | 2
(Czechoslovakia) **S Birner** | **6** | 3 | **6**
(United States) **B Gilbert** | **6** | **7**
Q | (United States) D Pate | 2 | 6
(Argentina) **R Argüello** | **6** | **7**
(United States) E Adams | 2 | 5

Second round
6 | (Sweden) **H Sundström** | 2 | **6** | **6**
(France) T Tulasne | **6** | 3 | 2
Q | (Spain) L Fargas | 3 | 2
9 | (Ecuador) **A Gómez** | **6** | **6**
(Czechoslovakia) **S Birner** | **6** | **6**
(United States) B Gilbert | 2 | 3
(Argentina) R Argüello | 1 | 0
2 | (Argentina) **G Vilas** | **6** | **6**

Third round
6 | (Sweden) H Sundström | 3 | 3
9 | (Ecuador) **A Gómez** | **6** | **6**
(Czechoslovakia) S Birner | 1 | 3
2 | (Argentina) **G Vilas** | **6** | **6**

Quarterfinals
9 | (Ecuador) **A Gómez** | **6** | **6**
2 | (Argentina) G Vilas | 4 | 4
