= 1981 Volvo International =

- Date: July 28 – August 3
- Edition: 9th
- Category: Grand Prix
- Draw: 64S / 32D
- Prize money: $175,000
- Surface: Clay / outdoor
- Location: North Conway, U.S.

Champions

Singles
- (Argentina) José Luis Clerc

Doubles
- (Switzerland) Heinz Günthardt / (Australia) Peter McNamara
- Volvo International

The 1981 Volvo International was a men's tennis tournament played on outdoor clay courts in North Conway, New Hampshire in the United States and was part of the 1981 Volvo Grand Prix. It was the ninth edition of the tournament and was held from July 28 through August 3, 1981. Third-seeded José Luis Clerc won the singles title.

== Finals ==
=== Singles ===
(Argentina) José Luis Clerc defeated (Argentina) Guillermo Vilas 6–3, 6–2

- It was Clerc's 5th title of the year and the 15th of his career.

=== Doubles ===
(Switzerland) Heinz Günthardt / (Australia) Peter McNamara defeated (Czechoslovakia) Pavel Složil / (United States) Ferdi Taygan 6–7, 7–5, 6–4

- It was Günthardt's 6th title of the year and the 10th of his career. It was McNamara's 4th title of the year and the 15th of his career.
