= 1982 Volvo International – Singles =

Singles
- 1982 Volvo International

Final
- Champion: (Czechoslovakia) Ivan Lendl
- Runner-up: (Spain) José Higueras
- Score: 6–3, 6–2

Details
- Draw: 64
- Seeds: 16

Events
Singles	Doubles
← 1981 ·	Volvo International	· 1983 →

José Luis Clerc was the defending champion but lost in the semifinals to Ivan Lendl.

Lendl won in the final 6–3, 6–2 against José Higueras.

== Seeds ==
A champion seed is indicated in bold text while text in italics indicates the round in which that seed was eliminated.

1. (Argentina) Guillermo Vilas (first round)
2. (Czechoslovakia) **Ivan Lendl (champion)**
3. (Argentina) José Luis Clerc (semifinals)
4. (United States) Eliot Teltscher (third round)
5. (South Africa) Johan Kriek (second round)
6. (Australia) Peter McNamara (semifinals)
7. (Ecuador) Andrés Gómez (third round)
8. (Spain) José Higueras (final)
9. (United States) Mel Purcell (quarterfinals)
10. (Hungary) Balázs Taróczy (quarterfinals)
11. (United States) Eddie Dibbs (third round)
12. (Australia) John Alexander (third round)
13. (Peru) Pablo Arraya (second round)
14. (Spain) Fernando Luna (quarterfinals)
15. (Australia) Paul McNamee (first round)
16. (Chile) Hans Gildemeister (third round)

== Draw ==
=== Key ===
- Q = Qualifier
- WC = Wild card
- LL = Lucky loser
- Alt = Alternate
- SE = Special exempt
- PR = Protected ranking
- ITF = ITF entry
- JE = Junior exempt
- w/o = Walkover
- r = Retired
- d = Defaulted
- SR = Special ranking

=== Finals ===
Semifinals
6	(Australia) Peter McNamara	3	1
8	(Spain) **José Higueras**	**6**	**6**
3	(Argentina) José Luis Clerc	4	**6**	4
2	(Czechoslovakia) **Ivan Lendl**	**6**	2	**6**

Final
8	(Spain) José Higueras	3	2
2	(Czechoslovakia) **Ivan Lendl**	**6**	**6**

=== Top half ===
==== Section 1 ====
First round
1	(Argentina) G Vilas	**7**	4	2
(Paraguay) **V Pecci**	5	**6**	**6**
Q	(Chile) **He Gildemeister**	5	**6**	**7**
(Spain) G Urpí	**7**	2	5
(South Africa) D Visser	5	3
Q	(United States) **K Kerns**	**7**	**6**
(South Africa) **F Sauer**	3
15	(Australia) P McNamee	4^{r}
13	(Peru) **P Arraya**	**6**	4	**6**
(United States) C Wittus	2	**6**	1
(France) **H Leconte**	**6**	3	**7**
Q	(United States) B Csipkay	3	**6**	6
(United States) **H Solomon**	4	**7**	**6**
(France) G Moretton	**6**	6	4
(United States) R Nixon	**7**	2	2
6	(Australia) **P McNamara**	5	**6**	**6**

Second round
(Paraguay) **V Pecci**	**6**	**6**
Q	(Chile) He Gildemeister	1	2
Q	(United States) K Kerns	2	1
(South Africa) **F Sauer**	**6**	**6**
13	(Peru) P Arraya	4	**6**	3
(France) **H Leconte**	**6**	4	**6**
(United States) H Solomon	2	6
6	(Australia) **P McNamara**	**6**	**7**

Third round
(Paraguay) **V Pecci**	**7**	4	3
(South Africa) F Sauer	6	**6**	2^{r}
(France) H Leconte	4	**7**	5
6	(Australia) **P McNamara**	**6**	6	**7**

Quarterfinals
(Paraguay) V Pecci	**7**	3	2
6	(Australia) **P McNamara**	6	**6**	**6**

==== Section 2 ====
First round
4	(United States) **E Teltscher**	**6**	**6**
(United Kingdom) J Smith	2	4
(South Africa) **M Myburg**	**6**	**7**
(South Africa) B Mitton	3	6
(Argentina) **A Gattiker**	**6**	3	**7**
(Australia) C Letcher	3	**6**	5
(Chile) R Acuña	6	2
9	(United States) **M Purcell**	**7**	**6**
11	(United States) **E Dibbs**	**6**	**6**
(Spain) Á Giménez	4	1
(Colombia) A Cortes	1	5
(France) **G Goven**	**6**	**7**
Q	(United States) **S Carnahan**	**6**	**6**
(Sweden) T Högstedt	4	3
(United States) J Brown	4	3
8	(Spain) **J Higueras**	**6**	**6**

Second round
4	(United States) **E Teltscher**	**6**	**6**
(South Africa) M Myburg	3	4
(Argentina) A Gattiker	1	3
9	(United States) **M Purcell**	**6**	**6**
11	(United States) **E Dibbs**	**6**	**6**
(France) G Goven	1	3
Q	(United States) S Carnahan	2	2
8	(Spain) **J Higueras**	**6**	**6**

Third round
4	(United States) E Teltscher	3	4
9	(United States) **M Purcell**	**6**	**6**
11	(United States) E Dibbs	4	2
8	(Spain) **J Higueras**	**6**	**6**

Quarterfinals
9	(United States) M Purcell	3	6
8	(Spain) **J Higueras**	**6**	**7**

=== Bottom half ===
==== Section 3 ====
First round
5	(South Africa) **J Kriek**	**7**	1	**7**
Q	(Australia) W Masur	5	**6**	6
(Czechoslovakia) J Granát	4	6
(Italy) **C Panatta**	**6**	**7**
Q	(United States) B Gilbert	3	**7**	4
(Sweden) **S Simonsson**	**6**	5	**6**
(United States) F Taygan	2	0
14	(Spain) **F Luna**	**6**	**6**
12	(Australia) **J Alexander**	**6**	3	**6**
Q	(United States) M Fishbach	4	**6**	2
(Uruguay) **D Pérez**	6	**6**	**6**
(Paraguay) F González	**7**	2	4
(Czechoslovakia) S Birner	2	**6**	4
(France) **T Tulasne**	**6**	1	**6**
Q	(United States) K Flach	0	4
3	(Argentina) **J L Clerc**	**6**	**6**

Second round
5	(South Africa) J Kriek	2	6
(Italy) **C Panatta**	**6**	**7**
(Sweden) S Simonsson	1	2
14	(Spain) **F Luna**	**6**	**6**
12	(Australia) **J Alexander**	2	**6**	**6**
(Uruguay) D Pérez	**6**	2	3
(France) T Tulasne	4	1
3	(Argentina) **J L Clerc**	**6**	**6**

Third round
(Italy) C Panatta	6	1
14	(Spain) **F Luna**	**7**	**6**
12	(Australia) J Alexander	2	2
3	(Argentina) **J L Clerc**	**6**	**6**

Quarterfinals
14	(Spain) F Luna	4	4
3	(Argentina) **J L Clerc**	**6**	**6**

==== Section 4 ====
First round
7	(Ecuador) **A Gómez**	**6**	5	**6**
(United States) E Fromm	3	**7**	3
(United States) **P Murphy**	**6**	4	**6**
(United States) R Fagel	4	**6**	3
(United States) M Vines	4	**6**	1
(West Germany) **R Gehring**	**6**	4	**6**
(Uruguay) J L Damiani	4	**6**	0
10	(Hungary) **B Taróczy**	**6**	3	**6**
16	(Chile) **Ha Gildemeister**	**6**	4	**6**
(Spain) J Avendaño	4	**6**	2
(United States) **M Leach**	**6**	4	**7**
(Spain) S Casal	4	**6**	5
(France) G Forget	6	**6**	**6**
(France) **B Fritz**	**7**	4	1
(Spain) J Aguilera	2	**6**	3
2	(Czechoslovakia) **I Lendl**	**6**	3	**6**

Second round
7	(Ecuador) **A Gómez**	**6**	**6**
(United States) P Murphy	3	4
(West Germany) R Gehring	1	1
10	(Hungary) **B Taróczy**	**6**	**6**
16	(Chile) **Ha Gildemeister**	**7**	**6**
(United States) M Leach	5	4
(France) B Fritz	4	0
2	(Czechoslovakia) **I Lendl**	**6**	**6**

Third round
7	(Ecuador) A Gómez	3	**6**	4
10	(Hungary) **B Taróczy**	**6**	4	**6**
16	(Chile) Ha Gildemeister	2	1
2	(Czechoslovakia) **I Lendl**	**6**	**6**

Quarterfinals
10	(Hungary) B Taróczy	2	4
2	(Czechoslovakia) **I Lendl**	**6**	**6**
