= 1982 Volvo International =

- Date: July 26 – August 2
- Edition: 10th
- Category: Grand Prix
- Draw: 64S / 32D
- Prize money: $200,000
- Surface: Clay / outdoor
- Location: North Conway, NH, U.S.

Champions

Singles
- (Czechoslovakia) Ivan Lendl

Doubles
- (United States) Sherwood Stewart / (United States) Ferdi Taygan
- Volvo International

The 1982 Volvo International was a men's tennis tournament played on outdoor clay courts in North Conway, New Hampshire in the United States and was part of the 1982 Volvo Grand Prix. It was the 10th edition of the tournament and was held from July 26 through August 2, 1982. Second-seeded Ivan Lendl won the singles title.

== Finals ==
=== Singles ===
(Czechoslovakia) Ivan Lendl defeated (Spain) José Higueras 6–3, 6–2

- It was Lendl's 10th title of the year and the 29th of his career.

=== Doubles ===
(United States) Sherwood Stewart / (United States) Ferdi Taygan defeated (Peru) Pablo Arraya / (United States) Eric Fromm 6–2, 7–6^{(7–3)}

- It was Stewart's 7th title of the year and the 40th of his career. It was Taygan's 5th title of the year and the 14th of his career.
