= 1984 Volvo International =

- Date: July 30 – August 6
- Edition: 12th
- Category: Grand Prix
- Draw: 64S / 32D
- Prize money: $200,000
- Surface: Clay / outdoor
- Location: North Conway, NH, U.S.

Champions

Singles
- (Sweden) Joakim Nyström

Doubles
- (United States) Brian Gottfried / (Czechoslovakia) Tomáš Šmíd
- Volvo International

The 1984 Volvo International was a men's tennis tournament played on outdoor clay courts in North Conway, New Hampshire in the United States and was part of the 1984 Volvo Grand Prix. The tournament ran from July 30 through August 6, 1984. Eighth-seeded Joakim Nyström won the singles title.

== Finals ==
=== Singles ===
(Sweden) Joakim Nyström defeated (United States) Tim Wilkison 6–2, 7–5

- It was Nyström's 2nd title of the year and the 4th of his career.

=== Doubles ===
(United States) Brian Gottfried / (Czechoslovakia) Tomáš Šmíd defeated (Brazil) Cássio Motta / (United States) Blaine Willenborg 6–4, 6–2

- It was Gottfried's only title of the year and the 79th of his career. It was Šmíd's 5th title of the year and the 35th of his career.
