= 1981 Volvo International – Doubles =

Doubles
- 1981 Volvo International
- 1980 Champions: (United States) Jimmy Connors (United States) Brian Gottfried

Final
- Champions: (Switzerland) Heinz Günthardt (Australia) Peter McNamara
- Runners-up: (Czechoslovakia) Pavel Složil (United States) Ferdi Taygan
- Score: 7–5, 6–4

Details
- Draw: 32
- Seeds: 8

Events
Singles	Doubles
← 1980 ·	Volvo International	· 1982 →

Jimmy Connors and Brian Gottfried were the defending champions but did not compete that year.

Heinz Günthardt and Peter McNamara won in the final 7–5, 6–4 against Pavel Složil and Ferdi Taygan.

== Seeds ==
Champion seeds are indicated in bold text while text in italics indicates the round in which those seeds were eliminated.

1. (Switzerland) **Heinz Günthardt** / (Australia) **Peter McNamara (champions)**
2. (Chile) Hans Gildemeister / (Ecuador) Andrés Gómez (quarterfinals)
3. (South Africa) Kevin Curren / (United States) Steve Denton (second round)
4. (Czechoslovakia) Pavel Složil / (United States) Ferdi Taygan (final)
5. (United States) Terry Moor / (United States) Eliot Teltscher (second round)
6. (South Africa) Johan Kriek / (United States) Hank Pfister (second round)
7. (Argentina) José Luis Clerc / (Chile) Belus Prajoux (quarterfinals)
8. (Australia) David Carter / (New Zealand) Chris Lewis (quarterfinals)

== Draw ==
=== Key ===
- Q = Qualifier
- WC = Wild card
- LL = Lucky loser
- Alt = Alternate
- SE = Special exempt
- PR = Protected ranking
- ITF = ITF entry
- JE = Junior exempt
- w/o = Walkover
- r = Retired
- d = Defaulted
- SR = Special ranking

=== Final ===
Final
1	(Switzerland) **Heinz Günthardt** (Australia) **Peter McNamara**	**7**	**6**
4	(Czechoslovakia) Pavel Složil (United States) Ferdi Taygan	5	4

=== Top half ===
First round
1	(Switzerland) **H Günthardt** (Australia) **P McNamara**	**6**	**6**
(United States) J Delaney (United States) J Lapidus	2	3
(Sweden) **P Hjertquist** (Sweden) **J Norbäck**	**7**	**6**
(United States) W Evans (United States) S Stefanki	5	3
(United States) **P Fishbach** (Paraguay) **F González**	**7**	**7**
(United States) T Delatte (United States) G Holroyd	6	5
(Bolivia) M Martinez (Socialist Federal Republic of Yugoslavia) M Ostoja	5	4
7	(Argentina) **J L Clerc** (Chile) **B Prajoux**	**7**	**6**
3	(South Africa) **K Curren** (United States) **S Denton**	**6**	**6**
(Argentina) F Dalla Fontana (Spain) G Urpí	4	2
(United States) **G Hardie** (France) **G Moretton**	**6**	**6**
(Chile) J Fernández (United States) P Kadesch	2	1
(United States) **D Dowlen** (Nigeria) **N Odizor**	**7**	**7**
(Czechoslovakia) S Birner (Finland) L Palin	6	6
(United States) A Chandronnait (United States) Mike Oransky	4	1
6	(South Africa) **J Kriek** (United States) **H Pfister**	**6**	**6**

Second round
1	(Switzerland) **H Günthardt** (Australia) **P McNamara**	**6**	**6**
(Sweden) P Hjertquist (Sweden) J Norbäck	2	3
(United States) P Fishbach (Paraguay) F González	4	**6**	1
7	(Argentina) **J L Clerc** (Chile) **B Prajoux**	**6**	1	**6**
3	(South Africa) K Curren (United States) S Denton	**6**	6	6
(United States) **G Hardie** (France) **G Moretton**	3	**7**	**7**
(United States) **D Dowlen** (Nigeria) **N Odizor**	3	**7**	**7**
6	(South Africa) J Kriek (United States) H Pfister	**6**	6	5

Quarterfinals
1	(Switzerland) **H Günthardt** (Australia) **P McNamara**	w/o
7	(Argentina) J L Clerc (Chile) B Prajoux
(United States) G Hardie (France) G Moretton	5	3
(United States) **D Dowlen** (Nigeria) **N Odizor**	**7**	**6**

Semifinals
1	(Switzerland) **H Günthardt** (Australia) **P McNamara**	**6**	**7**
(United States) D Dowlen (Nigeria) N Odizor	3	6

=== Bottom half ===
First round
8	(Australia) **D Carter** (New Zealand) **C Lewis**	**6**	**6**
(United States) R Fagel (South Africa) J Yuill	2	4
(Spain) **J López-Maeso** (Uruguay) **D Pérez**	**6**	4	2
(Uruguay) J L Damiani (Ecuador) R Ycaza	3	**6**	1^{r}
(Chile) **A Fillol** (Chile) **P Rebolledo**	w/o
(United States) M Purcell (United States) V Van Patten
(United States) D Pate (United States) Reston	2	1
4	(Czechoslovakia) **P Složil** (United States) **F Taygan**	**6**	**6**
5	(United States) **T Moor** (United States) **E Teltscher**	**6**	**6**
(Australia) J Bartlett (United States) C B Cox	2	4
(United States) **R Tanner** (United States) **E van Dillen**	**6**	**6**
(Spain) Á Giménez (Spain) J Higueras	2	2
(Argentina) **R Cano** (Argentina) **R Carruthers**	**7**	**6**
(United States) J DiLouie (United States) C B Strode	6	1
(Argentina) E Bengoechea (Brazil) M Hocevar	5	2
2	(Chile) **H Gildemeister** (Ecuador) **A Gómez**	**7**	**6**

Second round
8	(Australia) **D Carter** (New Zealand) **C Lewis**	w/o
(Spain) J López-Maeso (Uruguay) D Pérez
(Chile) A Fillol (Chile) P Rebolledo	1	5
4	(Czechoslovakia) **P Složil** (United States) **F Taygan**	**6**	**7**
5	(United States) T Moor (United States) E Teltscher	**6**	6	2
(United States) **R Tanner** (United States) **E van Dillen**	4	**7**	**6**
(Argentina) R Cano (Argentina) R Carruthers	4	**6**	4
2	(Chile) **H Gildemeister** (Ecuador) **A Gómez**	**6**	4	**6**

Quarterfinals
8	(Australia) D Carter (New Zealand) C Lewis	4	**6**	6
4	(Czechoslovakia) **P Složil** (United States) **F Taygan**	**6**	4	**7**
(United States) **R Tanner** (United States) **E van Dillen**	**7**	**6**
2	(Chile) H Gildemeister (Ecuador) A Gómez	6	4

Semifinals
4	(Czechoslovakia) **P Složil** (United States) **F Taygan**	6	**7**	**6**
(United States) R Tanner (United States) E van Dillen	**7**	5	3
