= 1978 Ramazzotti Cup – Singles =

Singles
- 1978 Ramazzotti Cup

Final
- Champion: (Sweden) Björn Borg
- Runner-up: (United States) Vitas Gerulaitis
- Score: 6–3, 6–3

Details
- Draw: 32
- Seeds: 8

Events
Singles	Doubles
- Milan Indoor

The 1978 Ramazzotti Cup – Singles was an event of the 1978 Ramazzotti Cup tennis tournament and was played on indoor carpet courts at the Palazzo dello Sport in Milan, Italy, between 27 March and 2 April 1978. The draw comprised 32 players and eight of them were seeded. First-seeded Björn Borg won the singles title after a straight-sets win in the final against second-seeded Vitas Gerulaitis, 6–3, 6–3.

== Seeds ==
1. (Sweden) Björn Borg (champion)
2. (United States) Vitas Gerulaitis (final)
3. (Mexico) Raúl Ramírez (first round)
4. (United States) Sandy Mayer (semifinals)
5. (Italy) Corrado Barazzutti (second round)
6. (United States) Dick Stockton (second round)
7. (Romania) Ilie Năstase (first round)
8. (Poland) Wojciech Fibak (second round)

== Draw ==
Key

- Q = Qualifier
- WC = Wild card
- LL = Lucky loser
- Alt = Alternate
- ITF = ITF entry
- PR = Protected ranking
- SR = Special ranking
- SE = Special exempt
- JE = Junior exempt
- JR = Junior Accelerator Programme entrant
- CO = College Accelerator Programme entrant
- NG = Next Gen Accelerator Program entrant
- w/o = Walkover
- r = Retired
- d = Defaulted

=== Finals ===
Semifinals
1	(Sweden) Björn Borg	6	6	6
(United States) Stan Smith	7	0	2
4	(United States) Sandy Mayer	7	5	1
2	(United States) Vitas Gerulaitis	6	7	6

Final
1	(Sweden) Björn Borg	6	6
2	(United States) Vitas Gerulaitis	3	3

=== Top half ===
First Round
1	(Sweden) Björn Borg	6	6
(Czechoslovakia) Tomáš Šmíd	3	0
(Socialist Federal Republic of Yugoslavia) Željko Franulović	3	7	6
(United Kingdom) John Lloyd	6	6	4
(Italy) Adriano Panatta	2	7	6
(United States) Mike MacHette	6	5	4
(United States) Tom Leonard	1	2
6	(United States) Dick Stockton	6	6
3	(Mexico) Raúl Ramírez	2	6	5
(United States) Peter Fleming	6	4	7
(Italy) Gianni Ocleppo	3	7	6
(Australia) Phil Dent	6	5	3
(United States) Stan Smith	6	6
(United Kingdom) Mark Cox	3	1
(United States) Bill Scanlon	2	3
8	(Poland) Wojciech Fibak	6	6

Second Round
1	(Sweden) Björn Borg	6	6
(Socialist Federal Republic of Yugoslavia) Željko Franulović	0	0
(Italy) Adriano Panatta	6	6
6	(United States) Dick Stockton	4	3
(United States) Peter Fleming	0	4
(Italy) Gianni Ocleppo	6	6
(United States) Stan Smith	6	2	6
8	(Poland) Wojciech Fibak	2	6	3

Quarterfinals
1	(Sweden) Björn Borg	6	6
(Italy) Adriano Panatta	3	3
(Italy) Gianni Ocleppo	6	3
(United States) Stan Smith	7	6

Semifinals
1	(Sweden) Björn Borg	6	6	6
(United States) Stan Smith	7	0	2

=== Bottom half ===
First Round
7	(Romania) Ilie Năstase	5	4
(United States) Bob Lutz	7	6
(Italy) Tonino Zugarelli	6	6
(Paraguay) Víctor Pecci	4	4
(Australia) Kim Warwick	6	7	6
(Australia) John Alexander	7	6	1
(Czechoslovakia) Jan Kodeš	3	1
4	(United States) Sandy Mayer	6	6
5	(Italy) Corrado Barazzutti	6	4	6
(Australia) Colin Dibley	4	6	3
(South Africa) Cliff Drysdale	1	6	1
(Spain) José Higueras	6	4	6
(Chile) Jaime Fillol	5	7	6
(New Zealand) Chris Lewis	7	6	2
(South Africa) Raymond Moore	3	6
2	(United States) Vitas Gerulaitis	6	7

Second Round
(United States) Bob Lutz	6	6	7
(Italy) Tonino Zugarelli	7	1	5
(Australia) Kim Warwick	2	1
4	(United States) Sandy Mayer	6	6
5	(Italy) Corrado Barazzutti	4	0
(Spain) José Higueras	6	6
(Chile) Jaime Fillol	6	3
2	(United States) Vitas Gerulaitis	7	6

Quarterfinals
(United States) Bob Lutz	4	2
4	(United States) Sandy Mayer	6	6
(Spain) José Higueras	2	6	4
2	(United States) Vitas Gerulaitis	6	4	6

Semifinals
4	(United States) Sandy Mayer	7	5	1
2	(United States) Vitas Gerulaitis	6	7	6
