= 1982 Volvo International – Doubles =

Doubles
- 1982 Volvo International
- 1981 Champions: (Switzerland) Heinz Günthardt (Australia) Peter McNamara

Final
- Champions: (United States) Sherwood Stewart (United States) Ferdi Taygan
- Runners-up: (Peru) Pablo Arraya (United States) Eric Fromm
- Score: 6–2, 7–6^{(7–3)}

Details
- Draw: 32
- Seeds: 8

Events
| Singles | Doubles |
| ← 1981 · | Volvo International | · 1983 → |

Heinz Günthardt and Peter McNamara were the defending champions, but only McNamara competed that year with Paul McNamee.

McNamara and McNamee lost in the first round to Rolf Gehring and Ángel Giménez.

Sherwood Stewart and Ferdi Taygan won in the final 6–2, 7–6^{(7–3)} against Pablo Arraya and Eric Fromm.

== Seeds ==
Champion seeds are indicated in bold text, while text in italics indicates the round in which those seeds were eliminated.

1. (Australia) Peter McNamara / (Australia) Paul McNamee (first round)
2. (United States) **Sherwood Stewart** / (United States) **Ferdi Taygan (champions)**
3. (Chile) Hans Gildemeister / (Ecuador) Andrés Gómez (first round)
4. (United States) Tracy Delatte / (South Africa) Johan Kriek (semifinals)
5. n/a
6. (Australia) John Alexander / (South Africa) Bernard Mitton (first round)
7. (United States) Mel Purcell / (United States) Eliot Teltscher (first round)
8. n/a

== Draw ==
=== Key ===
- Q = Qualifier
- WC = Wild card
- LL = Lucky loser
- Alt = Alternate
- SE = Special exempt
- PR = Protected ranking
- ITF = ITF entry
- JE = Junior exempt
- w/o = Walkover
- r = Retired
- d = Defaulted
- SR = Special ranking

=== Final ===
| Final |
| | (Peru) Pablo Arraya (United States) Eric Fromm | 2 | 6^{3} |
| 2 | (United States) **Sherwood Stewart** (United States) **Ferdi Taygan** | **6** | **7^{7}** |

=== Top half ===
First round
1 | (Australia) P McNamara (Australia) P McNamee
(West Germany) **R Gehring** (Spain) **Á Giménez** | w/o
(Spain) **J Avendaño** (South Africa) **M Myburg** | 4 | **6** | **6**
(Colombia) A Cortes (Chile) He Gildemeister | **6** | 3 | 4
(Romania) **I Țiriac** (Argentina) **G Vilas** | **7** | **6**
(Spain) J Aguilera (Spain) F Luna | 5 | 2
(Peru) **P Arraya** (United States) **E Fromm** | **6** | **6**
7 | (United States) M Purcell (United States) E Teltscher | 4 | 4
3 | (Chile) Ha Gildemeister (Ecuador) A Gómez | **6** | 2 | 2
(Chile) **R Acuña** (Argentina) **A Gattiker** | 4 | **6** | **6**
(United States) **R Nixon** (United States) **J Turpin** | **6** | **6**
(France) G Forget (France) G Goven | 4 | 3
(Spain) **J Higueras** (France) **H Leconte** | **6** | **6**
(United States) R Druz (United States) C Wittus | 2 | 2
(South Africa) **T Viljoen** (South Africa) **D Visser** | **7** | **6**
LL | (Italy) C Panatta (France) T Tulasne | 5 | 2

Second round
(West Germany) R Gehring (Spain) Á Giménez | 4 | 3
(Spain) **J Avendaño** (South Africa) **M Myburg** | **6** | **6**
(Romania) I Țiriac (Argentina) G Vilas | 2 | 4
(Peru) **P Arraya** (United States) **E Fromm** | **6** | **6**
(Chile) **R Acuña** (Argentina) **A Gattiker** | **7** | **6**
(United States) R Nixon (United States) J Turpin | 6 | 1
(Spain) J Higueras (France) H Leconte | 4 | 1
(South Africa) **T Viljoen** (South Africa) **D Visser** | **6** | **6**

Quarterfinals
(Spain) J Avendaño (South Africa) M Myburg | 4 | 2
(Peru) **P Arraya** (United States) **E Fromm** | **6** | **6**
(Chile) R Acuña (Argentina) A Gattiker | 1 | 6
(South Africa) **T Viljoen** (South Africa) **D Visser** | **6** | **7**

Semifinals
(Peru) **P Arraya** (United States) **E Fromm** | **6** | **7**
(South Africa) T Viljoen (South Africa) D Visser | 4 | 5

=== Bottom half ===
First round
6 | (Australia) J Alexander (South Africa) B Mitton | 3 | 3
(United States) **G Holroyd** (United States) **E Sherbeck** | **6** | **6**
(United States) **M Leach** (South Africa) **B Levine** | **6** | **6**
(United States) R Fagel (Uruguay) D Pérez | 3 | 2
(Argentina) **J L Damiani** (France) **G Moretton** | **7** | **6**
(United States) K Kerns (United States) C Leeds | 6 | 3
(Paraguay) F González (Paraguay) V Pecci | 4 | 6
4 | (United States) **T Delatte** (South Africa) **J Kriek** | **6** | **7**
LL | (Czechoslovakia) **J Granát** (United States) **M Vines** | 6 | **6** | **6**
(Australia) C Letcher (United Kingdom) J Smith | **7** | 4 | 3
(Czechoslovakia) **S Birner** (Sweden) **H Simonsson** | **6** | 3 | **6**
(United States) M Darby (Australia) W Masur | 3 | **6** | 1
(United States) **S Carnahan** (United States) **M Fishbach** | **6** | **6**
(United States) K Flach (United States) P Murphy | 2 | 3
(United States) G Petrovic (South Africa) R Venter | 3 | 2
2 | (United States) **S Stewart** (United States) **F Taygan** | **6** | **6**

Second round
(United States) **G Holroyd** (United States) **E Sherbeck** | **6** | 6 | **7**
(United States) M Leach (South Africa) B Levine | 3 | **7** | 6
(Uruguay) J L Damiani (France) G Moretton | **6** | 5 | 6
4 | (United States) **T Delatte** (South Africa) **J Kriek** | 4 | **7** | **7**
LL | (Czechoslovakia) J Granát (United States) M Vines | 3 | **6** | 4
(Czechoslovakia) **S Birner** (Sweden) **H Simonsson** | **6** | 3 | **6**
(United States) S Carnahan (United States) M Fishbach | 3 | 3
2 | (United States) **S Stewart** (United States) **F Taygan** | **6** | **6**

Quarterfinals
(United States) G Holroyd (United States) E Sherbeck | 2 | 1
4 | (United States) **T Delatte** (South Africa) **J Kriek** | **6** | **6**
(Czechoslovakia) S Birner (Sweden) H Simonsson | 6 | 3
2 | (United States) **S Stewart** (United States) **F Taygan** | **7** | **6**

Semifinals
4 | (United States) T Delatte (South Africa) J Kriek | 3 | 3
2 | (United States) **S Stewart** (United States) **F Taygan** | **6** | **6**
