= 1978 Madrid Grand Prix =

- Date: 2–8 October
- Edition: 7th
- Category: Grand Prix
- Draw: 64S / 32D
- Prize money: $75,000
- Surface: Clay / outdoor
- Location: Madrid, Spain
- Venue: Real Sociedad Hípica Española Club de Campo

Champions

Singles
- (Spain) José Higueras

Doubles
- (Czechoslovakia) Jan Kodeš / (Poland) Wojciech Fibak
- Madrid Tennis Grand Prix

The 1978 Madrid Grand Prix, also known by its sponsored name IV Trofeo Gillette, was a men's tennis tournament played on outdoor clay courts that was part of the 1978 Colgate-Palmolive Grand Prix tennis circuit. It was the seventh edition of the tournament and was held at the Real Sociedad Hípica Española Club de Campo in Madrid, Spain from 2 October until 8 October 1978. Fourth-seeded José Higueras won the singles title.

== Finals ==
=== Singles ===
(Spain) José Higueras defeated (Czechoslovakia) Tomáš Šmíd 6–3, 6–7, 6–3, 6–2

- It was Higuera's 4th and last singles title of the year and the 6th of his career.

=== Doubles ===
(Czechoslovakia) Jan Kodeš / (Poland) Wojciech Fibak defeated (Czechoslovakia) Pavel Složil / (Czechoslovakia) Tomáš Šmíd 6–7, 6–1, 6–2

- It was Kodeš' 2nd and last doubles title of the year and of the 15th of his career. It was Fibak's 7yh doubles title of the year and the 29th of his career.
