= 1978 Ramazzotti Cup – Doubles =

Doubles
- 1978 Ramazzotti Cup

Final
- Champion: (Spain) José Higueras (Paraguay) Víctor Pecci
- Runner-up: (Poland) Wojciech Fibak (Mexico) Raúl Ramírez
- Score: 5–7, 7–6, 7–6

Details
- Draw: 14
- Seeds: 4

Events
| Singles | Doubles |
- Milan Indoor

The 1978 Ramazzotti Cup – Doubles was an event of the 1978 Ramazzotti Cup tennis tournament and was played on indoor carpet courts at the Palazzo dello Sport in Milan, Italy, between 27 March and 2 April 1978. The draw comprised 14 teams and four of them were seeded. The unseeded team of José Higueras and Víctor Pecci won the doubles title after a three-sets win in the final against second-seeded pairing Wojciech Fibak and Raúl Ramírez, 5–7, 7–6, 7–6.

== Seeds ==
1. (United States) Bob Lutz / (United States) Stan Smith (Semifinals)
2. (Poland) Wojciech Fibak / (Mexico) Raúl Ramírez (Final)
3. (United States) Fred McNair / (United States) Sherwood Stewart (First round)
4. (United States) Vitas Gerulaitis / (United States) Sandy Mayer (First round)

== Draw ==
Key

- Q = Qualifier
- WC = Wild card
- LL = Lucky loser
- Alt = Alternate
- ITF = ITF entry
- PR = Protected ranking
- SR = Special ranking
- SE = Special exempt
- JE = Junior exempt
- JR = Junior Accelerator Programme entrant
- CO = College Accelerator Programme entrant
- NG = Next Gen Accelerator Program entrant
- w/o = Walkover
- r = Retired
- d = Defaulted

First Round
1 | (United States) Bob Lutz (United States) Stan Smith | 6 | 7 | 6
(Italy) Corrado Barazzutti (Italy) Tonino Zugarelli | 7 | 5 | 0
3 | (United States) Fred McNair (United States) Sherwood Stewart | 2 | 6 | 1
(Socialist Federal Republic of Yugoslavia) Željko Franulović (South Africa) Raymond Moore | 6 | 4 | 6
(Italy) Adriano Panatta (United States) Dick Stockton | 3 | 4
(Spain) José Higueras (Paraguay) Víctor Pecci | 6 | 6
(United Kingdom) Mark Cox (South Africa) Cliff Drysdale
(Czechoslovakia) Jan Kodeš (Czechoslovakia) Tomáš Šmíd | w/o
(Chile) Jaime Fillol (Romania) Ilie Năstase | 6 | 0 | 6
4 | (United States) Vitas Gerulaitis (United States) Sandy Mayer | 4 | 6 | 3
(United States) Tom Leonard (United States) Mike MacHette | 6 | 6
(United States) Peter Fleming (United States) Bill Scanlon | 3 | 4

Quarterfinals
1 | (United States) Bob Lutz (United States) Stan Smith | 6 | 6
(Australia) Syd Ball (Australia) Kim Warwick | 2 | 4
(Socialist Federal Republic of Yugoslavia) Željko Franulović (South Africa) Raymond Moore | 1 | 6
(Spain) José Higueras (Paraguay) Víctor Pecci | 6 | 7
(Czechoslovakia) Jan Kodeš (Czechoslovakia) Tomáš Šmíd | 6 | 1
(Chile) Jaime Fillol (Romania) Ilie Năstase | 3 | 1^{r}
(United States) Tom Leonard (United States) Mike MacHette | 4 | 4
2 | (Poland) Wojciech Fibak (Mexico) Raúl Ramírez | 6 | 6

Semifinals
1 | (United States) Bob Lutz (United States) Stan Smith | 3 | 5
(Spain) José Higueras (Paraguay) Víctor Pecci | 6 | 7
(Czechoslovakia) Jan Kodeš (Czechoslovakia) Tomáš Šmíd | 2 | 4
2 | (Poland) Wojciech Fibak (Mexico) Raúl Ramírez | 6 | 6

Final
(Spain) José Higueras (Paraguay) Víctor Pecci | 5 | 7 | 7
2 | (Poland) Wojciech Fibak (Mexico) Raúl Ramírez | 7 | 6 | 6
