= 1985 Swiss Open Gstaad =

- Date: 8–14 July
- Edition: 39th
- Category: Grand Prix
- Draw: 32S / 16D
- Prize money: $150,000
- Surface: Clay / outdoor
- Location: Gstaad, Switzerland

Champions

Singles
- (Sweden) Joakim Nyström

Doubles
- (Poland) Wojciech Fibak / (Czechoslovakia) Tomáš Šmíd
- Suisse Open Gstaad

The 1985 Swiss Open Gstaad was a men's tennis tournament played on outdoor clay courts in Gstaad, Switzerland that was part of the 1985 Nabisco Grand Prix tennis circuit. It was the 39th edition of the tournament and was held from 8 July through 14 July 1985. First-seeded Joakim Nyström won his second consecutive singles title at the event.

== Finals ==
=== Singles ===
(Sweden) Joakim Nyström defeated (West Germany) Andreas Maurer 6–4, 1–6, 7–5, 6–3

- It was Nyström's 2nd and last singles title of the year and the 7th of his career.

=== Doubles ===
(Poland) Wojciech Fibak / (Czechoslovakia) Tomáš Šmíd defeated (Australia) Brad Drewett / (Australia) Mark Edmondson 6–7, 6–4, 6–4
