= Kevin Kern =

Kevin Kern may refer to:

- Kevin Kern (musician), American pianist, composer and recording artist
- Kevin Kern (actor), Broadway actor

== See also ==
- Kevin Kerns, American tennis player
