= 1978 Ramazzotti Cup =

- Date: 27 March – 2 April
- Edition: 1st
- Category: Grand Prix (WCT)
- Draw: 32S / 16D
- Prize money: $175,000
- Surface: Carpet / indoor
- Location: Milan, Italy
- Venue: Palazzo dello Sport
- Attendance: 76,841

Champions

Singles
- (Sweden) Björn Borg

Doubles
- (Spain) José Higueras / (Paraguay) Víctor Pecci
- Milan Indoor

The 1978 Ramazzotti Cup, also known as the Milan Indoor or Milan WCT, was a men's tennis tournament played on indoor carpet courts at the Palazzo dello Sport in Milan in Italy. The event was part WCT Tour which was incorporated into the 1978 Colgate-Palmolive Grand Prix circuit. It was the inaugural edition of the tournament and was held from 27 March through 2 April 1978. Second-seeded Björn Borg won the singles title. Total attendance for the tournament was 76,841.

== Finals ==
=== Singles ===
(Sweden) Björn Borg defeated (United States) Vitas Gerulaitis 6–3, 6–3

- It was Borg's 4th singles title of the year and the 34th of his career.

=== Doubles ===
(Spain) José Higueras / (Paraguay) Víctor Pecci defeated (Poland) Wojciech Fibak / (Mexico) Raúl Ramírez 5–7, 7–6, 7–6
