= 1983 Volvo International =

Men's tennis tournament

- Date: July 25–31
- Edition: 11th
- Category: Grand Prix
- Draw: 56S / 28D
- Prize money: $200,000
- Surface: Clay / outdoor
- Location: North Conway, NH, U.S.

Champions

Singles
- (Argentina) José Luis Clerc

Doubles
- (Australia) Mark Edmondson / (United States) Sherwood Stewart
- Volvo International

The 1983 Volvo International was a men's tennis tournament played on outdoor clay courts in North Conway, New Hampshire in the United States and was part of the 1983 Volvo Grand Prix circuit. It was the 11th edition of the tournament and was held from July 25 through July 31, 1983. Third-seeded José Luis Clerc won the singles title.

== Finals ==
=== Singles ===
(Argentina) José Luis Clerc defeated (Ecuador) Andrés Gómez 6–3, 6–1

- It was Clerc's 4th title of the year and the 26th of his career.

=== Doubles ===
(Australia) Mark Edmondson / (United States) Sherwood Stewart defeated (United States) Eric Fromm / (United States) Drew Gitlin 7–6, 6–1

- It was Edmondson's 1st title of the year and the 29th of his career. It was Stewart's 1st title of the year and the 43rd of his career.
