= Lisbon Open =

Defunct tennis tournament
- Event name: Lights Cup
- Tour: Grand Prix (Super Series)
- Founded: 1983
- Abolished: 1983
- Editions: 1
- Location: Lisbon, Portugal
- Surface: Clay / outdoor

Current champions (1983)
- Singles: (Sweden) Mats Wilander
- Doubles: (Brazil) Carlos Kirmayr (Brazil) Cássio Motta

The Lisbon Open, also known by its sponsorship name Lights Cup, is a defunct men's tennis tournament. It was held for one year, in 1983, in Lisbon, Portugal and was played on outdoor clay courts. It was a Super Series category tournament and was part of the Grand Prix tennis circuit.

The tournament was organized by Hans Burkert, director of the Frankfurt Grand Prix tournament. He decided to move the Frankfurt Super Series tournament, held from 1980 until 1982, to Portugal because of the competition of other major events in West Germany and with the aim to develop professional tennis in Portugal.

== Finals ==
=== Singles ===
Year	Champions	Runners-up	Score
1983	(Sweden) Mats Wilander	(France) Yannick Noah	2–6, 7–6, 6–4

=== Doubles ===
Year	Champions	Runners-up	Score
1983	(Brazil) Carlos Kirmayr (Brazil) Cássio Motta	(Czech Republic) Pavel Složil (United States) Ferdi Taygan	7–5, 6–4

== See also ==
- Portuguese International Championships
