= Kevin Kerns =

American tennis player

- Country (sports): United States
- Born: April 24, 1959 (age 67) Levittown, Pennsylvania

Singles
- Career record: 1–3
- Highest ranking: No. 349 (January 3, 1983)

Doubles
- Career record: 5–12
- Highest ranking: No. 272 (January 2, 1984)

Grand Slam doubles results
- US Open: 1R (1981)

Grand Slam mixed doubles results
- US Open: 1R (1981)

Kevin Kerns (born April 24, 1959) is an American former professional tennis player.

Kerns grew up in Bucks County, Pennsylvania, attending Pennsbury High School.

While competing on the professional tour, Kerns had best rankings of 349 in singles and 272 in doubles. He featured in the men's doubles and mixed doubles main draws at the 1981 US Open, falling in the first round in both. In the men's doubles, he and John Hayes managed to take a set off the top-seeded pairing of Peter Fleming and John McEnroe.
