= Palasport di San Siro =

Indoor arena in Milan, Italy

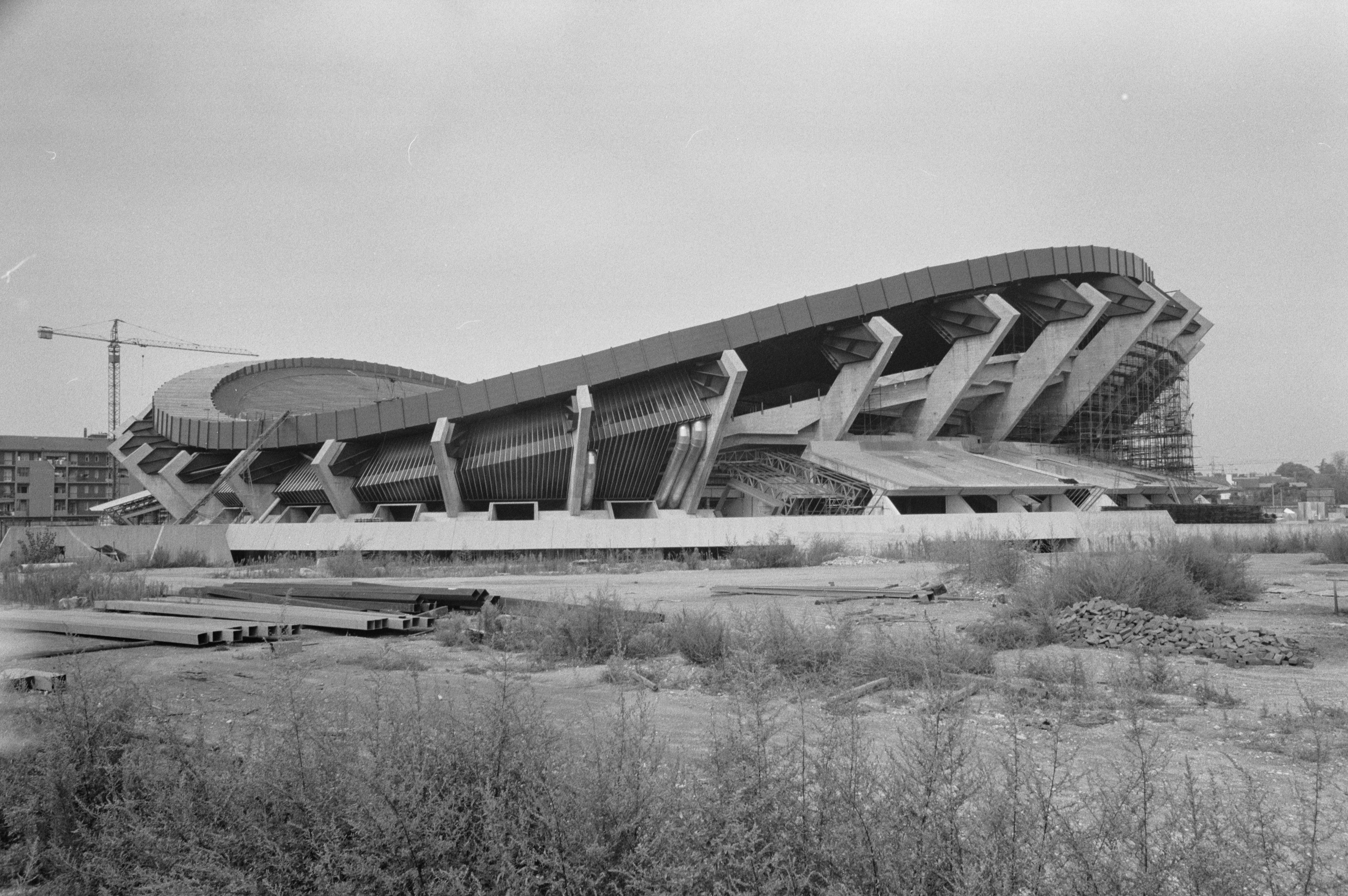
- The arena under construction in 1974
- Interactive map of Palasport di San Siro
- Location: Milan, Lombardia, Italy
- Coordinates: 45°28′45.05″N 9°7′7.69″E
- Capacity: 18,000

Construction
- Opened: 1976
- Demolished: 1985

Tenants
- 1978 European Athletics Indoor Championships; 1982 European Athletics Indoor Championships; Olimpia Milano (1976-1985)

Palasport di San Siro was an indoor arena in Milan, Italy. It was primarily used for basketball and volleyball until the PalaSharp opened in 1985. The arena held 18,000 spectators and opened on 31 January 1976. On 17 January 1985, a large snowfall collapsed the roof and the arena was closed.

On 14 and 15 September 1984, at Palasport di San Siro, British rock band Queen performed their only concerts - other than the 1984 Sanremo Music Festival - in Italy with Freddie Mercury as frontman.

Preceded by Velódromo de Anoeta; San Sebastián	European Indoor Championships in Athletics; Venue; 1978	Succeeded by Budapest Sportcsarnok; Budapest
Preceded by Palais des Sports; Grenoble	European Indoor Championships in Athletics; Venue; 1982	Succeeded by Ferry-Dusika-Hallenstadion; Vienna
