= Joakim Nyström =

Swedish tennis player

- Country (sports): Sweden
- Residence: Monte Carlo, Monaco
- Born: 20 February 1963 (age 63) Skellefteå, Sweden
- Height: 1.88 m (6 ft 2 in)
- Turned pro: 1980
- Retired: 1989
- Plays: Right-handed (two-handed backhand)
- Prize money: $2,074,947

Singles
- Career record: 265–142
- Career titles: 13
- Highest ranking: No. 7 (31 March 1986)

Grand Slam singles results
- Australian Open: 4R (1983, 1984, 1985)
- French Open: QF (1985)
- Wimbledon: 3R (1985, 1986, 1987, 1988)
- US Open: QF (1985, 1986)

Other tournaments
- Tour Finals: QF (1984)
- WCT Finals: SF (1985)

Doubles
- Career record: 185–116
- Career titles: 8
- Highest ranking: No. 4 (10 November 1986)

Grand Slam doubles results
- Australian Open: F (1984)
- French Open: SF (1985)
- Wimbledon: W (1986)
- US Open: F (1986)

Team competitions
- Davis Cup: W (1984, 1985, 1987)

Joakim "Jocke" Nyström (Swedish pronunciation: [ˈjûːakɪm ˈnŷːstrøːm]; born 20 February 1963) is a tennis coach and a former top ten ranked professional player from Sweden who won 13 singles titles during his career. The right-hander reached his highest singles ranking on the ATP Tour on 31 March 1986, when he was ranked world No. 7. He was also ranked world No. 4 in doubles that same year.

== Professional career ==
He was a singles quarterfinalist at both the French Open (1985) and US Open (1985, 1986) tournaments, the 1986 Wimbledon doubles champion with Mats Wilander, and a member of the winning 1985 and 1987 Davis Cup teams from Sweden. He qualified for The Masters year-end singles tournament in 1984, 1985, and 1986.

Nyström was part of the generation of outstanding Swedish players in the 1980s and early 1990s, which included Anders Järryd, Jonas Svensson, Mikael Pernfors, Kent Carlsson, Stefan Edberg, Henrik Sundström, Magnus Gustafsson, and Mats Wilander.

== Coaching career ==
Since retiring from tennis, Nyström has served as Fed Cup captain for Sweden and as an assistant coach to Wilander with the Swedish Davis Cup team. Outside these commitments, he coached both Finn Jarkko Nieminen and Austrian Jürgen Melzer. Jack Sock has also hired him as his coach.

He coached Kamil Majchrzak from December 2020 till August 2022.

== Singles performance timeline ==
Key
W	F	SF	QF	#R	RR	Q#	DNQ	A	NH

(W) winner; (F) finalist; (SF) semifinalist; (QF) quarterfinalist; (#R) rounds 4, 3, 2, 1; (RR) round-robin stage; (Q#) qualification round; (DNQ) did not qualify; (A) absent; (NH) not held; (SR) strike rate (events won / competed); (W–L) win–loss record.

Tournament	1980	1981	1982	1983	1984	1985	1986	1987	1988	1989	Career SR	Career W–L
Grand Slam tournaments
Australian Open	A	1R	A	4R	3R	3R	NH	A	A	1R	0 / 5	7–5
French Open	A	1R	4R	3R	2R	QF	1R	4R	3R	A	0 / 8	15–8
Wimbledon	A	2R	1R	A	2R	3R	3R	3R	3R	A	0 / 7	10–7
US Open	A	A	A	4R	4R	QF	QF	2R	1R	A	0 / 6	16–6
SR	0 / 0	0 / 3	0 / 2	0 / 3	0 / 4	0 / 4	0 / 3	0 / 3	0 / 3	0 / 1	0 / 26	N/A
Win–loss	0–0	1–3	3–2	8–3	8–4	12–4	6–3	6–3	4–3	0–1	N/A	48–26
Year-end championships
The Masters	A	A	A	A	QF	1R	RR	A	A	A	0 / 3	2–4

== Career finals ==
=== Singles: 18 (13 titles / 5 runner-ups) ===
Result	W/L	Date	Tournament	Surface	Opponent	Score
Loss	0–1	May 1983	Munich, West Germany	Clay	(Czechoslovakia) Tomáš Šmíd	0–6, 3–6, 6–4, 6–2, 5–7
Win	1–1	Dec 1983	Sydney Outdoor, Australia	Grass	(United States) Mike Bauer	2–6, 6–3, 6–1
Win	2–1	Jul 1984	Gstaad, Switzerland	Clay	(United States) Brian Teacher	6–4, 6–2
Win	3–1	Aug 1984	North Conway, U.S.	Clay	(United States) Tim Wilkison	6–2, 7–5
Loss	3–2	Oct 1984	Barcelona, Spain	Clay	(Sweden) Mats Wilander	6–7^{(5–7)}, 4–6, 6–0, 2–6
Win	4–2	Oct 1984	Basel, Switzerland	Hard (i)	(United States) Tim Wilkison	6–3, 3–6, 6–4, 6–2
Win	5–2	Oct 1984	Cologne, West Germany	Carpet (i)	(Czechoslovakia) Miloslav Mečíř	7–6, 6–2
Win	6–2	May 1985	Munich, West Germany	Clay	(West Germany) Hans Schwaier	6–1, 6–0
Win	7–2	Jul 1985	Gstaad, Switzerland	Clay	(West Germany) Andreas Maurer	6–4, 1–6, 7–5, 6–3
Loss	7–3	Sep 1985	Palermo, Italy	Clay	(France) Thierry Tulasne	2–6, 0–6
Win	8–3	Feb 1986	Toronto Indoor, Canada	Carpet (i)	(Czechoslovakia) Milan Šrejber	6–1, 6–4
Win	9–3	Mar 1986	La Quinta, U.S.	Hard	(France) Yannick Noah	6–1, 6–3, 6–2
Loss	9–4	Mar 1986	Milan, Italy	Carpet (i)	(Czechoslovakia) Ivan Lendl	2–6, 2–6, 4–6
Win	10–4	Mar 1986	Rotterdam, Netherlands	Carpet (i)	(Sweden) Anders Järryd	6–0, 6–3
Win	11–4	Apr 1986	Monte-Carlo, Monaco	Clay	(France) Yannick Noah	6–3, 6–2
Win	12–4	May 1986	Madrid, Spain	Clay	(Sweden) Kent Carlsson	6–1, 6–1
Loss	12–5	Feb 1987	Lyon, France	Carpet (i)	(France) Yannick Noah	4–6, 5–7
Win	13–5	Aug 1987	Båstad, Sweden	Clay	(Sweden) Stefan Edberg	4–6, 6–0, 6–3

=== Doubles: 20 (8 title /, 12 runner-ups) ===
Result	W/L	Year	Tournament	Surface	Partner	Opponents	Score
Loss	0–1	1982	Båstad, Sweden	Clay	(Sweden) Mats Wilander	(Sweden) Anders Järryd (Sweden) Hans Simonsson	6–0, 3–6, 6–7
Win	1–1	1983	Båstad, Sweden	Clay	(Sweden) Mats Wilander	(Sweden) Anders Järryd (Sweden) Hans Simonsson	1–6, 7–6, 7–6
Loss	1–2	1983	Geneva, Switzerland	Clay	(Sweden) Mats Wilander	(Czechoslovakia) Stanislav Birner (United States) Blaine Willenborg	1–6, 6–2, 3–6
Loss	1–3	1984	Cologne, West Germany	Carpet (i)	(Sweden) Jan Gunnarsson	(Poland) Wojciech Fibak (United States) Sandy Mayer	1–6, 3–6
Loss	1–4	1984	Australian Open, Melbourne	Grass	(Sweden) Mats Wilander	(Australia) Mark Edmondson (United States) Sherwood Stewart	2–6, 2–6, 5–7
Win	2–4	1985	Philadelphia, U.S.	Carpet (i)	(Sweden) Mats Wilander	(Poland) Wojciech Fibak (United States) Sandy Mayer	3–6, 6–2, 6–2
Loss	2–5	1985	Cincinnati, U.S.	Hard	(Sweden) Mats Wilander	(Sweden) Stefan Edberg (Sweden) Anders Järryd	6–4, 2–6, 3–6
Win	3–5	1985	Palermo, Italy	Clay	(United Kingdom) Colin Dowdeswell	(Spain) Sergio Casal (Spain) Emilio Sánchez	6–4, 6–7, 7–6
Loss	3–6	1985	Masters, New York	Carpet (i)	(Sweden) Mats Wilander	(Sweden) Stefan Edberg (Sweden) Anders Järryd	1–6, 6–7
Win	4–6	1986	Toronto Indoor, Canada	Carpet (i)	(Poland) Wojciech Fibak	(South Africa) Christo Steyn (South Africa) Danie Visser	6–3, 7–6
Loss	4–7	1986	Monte-Carlo, Monaco	Clay	(Sweden) Mats Wilander	(France) Guy Forget (France) Yannick Noah	4–6, 6–3, 4–6
Win	5–7	1986	Madrid, Spain	Clay	(Sweden) Anders Järryd	(Spain) Jesus Colas (Spain) David de Miguel	6–2, 6–2
Win	6–7	1986	Wimbledon, London	Grass	(Sweden) Mats Wilander	(United States) Gary Donnelly (United States) Peter Fleming	7–6, 6–3, 6–3
Loss	6–8	1986	Gstaad, Switzerland	Clay	(Sweden) Stefan Edberg	(Spain) Sergio Casal (Spain) Emilio Sánchez	3–6, 6–3, 3–6
Loss	6–9	1986	US Open, New York	Hard	(Sweden) Mats Wilander	(Ecuador) Andrés Gómez (Socialist Federal Republic of Yugoslavia) Slobodan Živojinović	6–4, 3–6, 3–6, 6–4, 3–6
Win	7–9	1986	Barcelona, Spain	Clay	(Sweden) Jan Gunnarsson	(Peru) Carlos di Laura (Italy) Claudio Panatta	6–3, 6–4
Loss	7–10	1987	Boston, U.S.	Clay	(Sweden) Mats Wilander	(Chile) Hans Gildemeister (Ecuador) Andrés Gómez	6–7, 6–3, 1–6
Loss	7–11	1987	Indianapolis, U.S.	Clay	(Sweden) Mats Wilander	(Australia) Laurie Warder (United States) Blaine Willenborg	0–6, 3–6
Win	8–11	1988	Bordeaux, France	Clay	(Italy) Claudio Panatta	(Argentina) Christian Miniussi (Italy) Diego Nargiso	6–1, 6–4
Loss	8–12	1988	Kitzbühel, Austria	Clay	(Italy) Claudio Panatta	(Spain) Sergio Casal (Spain) Emilio Sánchez	4–6, 6–7
