= Cássio Motta =

Brazilian tennis player (born 1960)

- Country (sports): Brazil
- Residence: São Paulo, Brazil
- Born: 22 February 1960 (age 66) São Paulo, Brazil
- Height: 1.80 m (5 ft 11 in)
- Turned pro: 1979
- Retired: 1994
- Plays: Right-handed (one-handed backhand)
- Coach: Paulo Cleto
- Prize money: $986,595

Singles
- Career record: 108–174
- Career titles: 0
- Highest ranking: No. 48 (8 December 1986)

Grand Slam singles results
- French Open: 3R (1984, 1985, 1986)
- Wimbledon: 3R (1983, 1984)
- US Open: 2R (1986)

Doubles
- Career record: 226–194
- Career titles: 10
- Highest ranking: No. 4 (26 September 1983)

Grand Slam doubles results
- French Open: SF (1982, 1992)
- Wimbledon: 3R (1990, 1991)
- US Open: QF (1984)

Grand Slam mixed doubles results
- French Open: F (1982)
- Wimbledon: 3R (1985)

Team competitions
- Davis Cup: SF (1992)

Cássio Motta (born 22 February 1960) is a former professional tennis player from Brazil. He played in the mixed doubles final of the French Open with Cláudia Monteiro in 1982.

== Grand Slam finals ==
=== Mixed doubles (1 runners-up) ===
Result	Year	Championship	Surface	Partner	Opponents	Score
Loss	1982	French Open	Clay	(Brazil) Cláudia Monteiro	(United Kingdom) John Lloyd (Australia) Wendy Turnbull	6–2, 7–6^{(10–8)}

== Career finals ==
=== Doubles (10 wins / 13 losses) ===
Legend Grand Slam (0) Tennis Masters Cup (0) ATP Masters Series (0) ATP Tour (10)	Titles by surface Hard (1) Grass (0) Clay (9) Carpet (0)

Result	W/L	Date	Tournament	Surface	Partner	Opponents	Score
Win	1–0	Sep 1979	Madrid, Spain	Clay	(Brazil) Carlos Kirmayr	(United Kingdom) Robin Drysdale (United Kingdom) John Feaver	7–6, 6–4
Loss	1–1	Oct 1979	Barcelona, Spain	Clay	(Brazil) Carlos Kirmayr	(Italy) Paolo Bertolucci (Italy) Adriano Panatta	4–6, 3–6
Loss	1–2	Jun 1981	Brussels, Belgium	Clay	(Brazil) Carlos Kirmayr	(Argentina) Ricardo Cano (Ecuador) Andrés Gómez	2–6, 2–6
Loss	1–3	Jan 1982	Guarujá, Brazil	Clay	(Brazil) Carlos Kirmayr	(Australia) Phil Dent (Australia) Kim Warwick	7–6, 2–6, 3–6
Win	2–3	Jun 1982	Venice, Italy	Clay	(Brazil) Carlos Kirmayr	(Argentina) José Luis Clerc (Romania) Ilie Năstase	6–4, 6–2
Loss	2–4	Oct 1982	Barcelona, Spain	Clay	(Brazil) Carlos Kirmayr	(Sweden) Anders Järryd (Sweden) Hans Simonsson	3–6, 2–6
Win	3–4	Nov 1982	São Paulo, Brazil	Clay	(Brazil) Carlos Kirmayr	(Australia) Peter McNamara (United States) Ferdi Taygan	6–3, 6–1
Win	4–4	Apr 1983	Lisbon, Portugal	Clay	(Brazil) Carlos Kirmayr	(Czechoslovakia) Pavel Složil (United States) Ferdi Taygan	7–5, 6–4
Win	5–4	Jul 1983	Boston, U.S.	Clay	(United States) Mark Dickson	(Chile) Hans Gildemeister (Chile) Belus Prajoux	7–5, 6–3
Win	6–4	Jul 1983	Washington, D.C.	Clay	(United States) Mark Dickson	(Australia) Paul McNamee (United States) Ferdi Taygan	6–2, 1–6, 6–4
Loss	6–5	Aug 1983	Indianapolis, U.S.	Clay	(Brazil) Carlos Kirmayr	(Australia) Mark Edmondson (United States) Sherwood Stewart	3–6, 2–6
Loss	6–6	Aug 1983	Cincinnati, U.S.	Hard	(Brazil) Carlos Kirmayr	(United States) Victor Amaya (United States) Tim Gullikson	4–6, 3–6
Loss	6–7	Oct 1983	Vienna, Austria	Carpet	(Brazil) Marcos Hocevar	(United States) Mel Purcell (United States) Stan Smith	3–6, 4–6
Loss	6–8	Aug 1984	North Conway, U.S.	Clay	(United States) Blaine Willenborg	(United States) Brian Gottfried (Czechoslovakia) Tomáš Šmíd	4–6, 2–6
Win	7–8	Apr 1985	Marbella, Spain	Clay	(Ecuador) Andrés Gómez	(France) Loïc Courteau (Netherlands) Michiel Schapers	6–1, 6–1
Loss	7–9	Sep 1985	Geneva, Switzerland	Clay	(Brazil) Carlos Kirmayr	(Spain) Sergio Casal (Spain) Emilio Sánchez	4–6, 6–4, 5–7
Win	8–9	Jan 1987	Guarujá, Brazil	Hard	(Brazil) Luiz Mattar	(West Germany) Martin Hipp (West Germany) Tore Meinecke	7–6, 6–1
Win	9–9	Jul 1989	Gstaad, Switzerland	Clay	(United States) Todd Witsken	(Czechoslovakia) Petr Korda (Czechoslovakia) Milan Šrejber	6–4, 6–3
Loss	9–10	Feb 1990	Guarujá, Brazil	Hard	(Brazil) Luiz Mattar	(Argentina) Javier Frana (Argentina) Gustavo Luza	6–7, 6–7
Loss	9–11	Mar 1990	Miami, U.S.	Hard	(West Germany) Boris Becker	(United States) Rick Leach (United States) Jim Pugh	4–6, 6–3, 3–6
Win	10–11	Apr 1991	Madrid, Spain	Clay	(Argentina) Gustavo Luza	(Brazil) Luiz Mattar (Brazil) Jaime Oncins	6–0, 7–5
Loss	10–12	May 1991	Hamburg, Germany	Clay	(South Africa) Danie Visser	(Spain) Sergio Casal (Spain) Emilio Sánchez	6–4, 3–6, 2–6
Loss	10–13	Nov 1991	São Paulo, Brazil	Hard	(Mexico) Jorge Lozano	(Ecuador) Andrés Gómez (Brazil) Jaime Oncins	5–7, 4–6

=== Singles (1 loss) ===
Legend Grand Slam (0) Tennis Masters Cup (0) ATP Masters Series (0) ATP Tour (1)	Titles by surface Hard (1) Grass (0) Clay (0) Carpet (0)

Result	W/L	Date	Tournament	Surface	Opponent	Score
Loss	0–1	Jan 1987	Guarujá, Brazil	Hard	(Brazil) Luiz Mattar	6–3, 5–7, 6–2
