= Ferdi Taygan =

American tennis player

- Country (sports): United States
- Born: December 5, 1956 (age 69) Worcester, Massachusetts
- Height: 5 ft 8 in (1.73 m)
- Turned pro: 1977
- Plays: Right-handed
- Prize money: $668,104

Singles
- Career record: 74–120
- Career titles: 0
- Highest ranking: No. 67 (December 26, 1979)

Grand Slam singles results
- Australian Open: 2R (1980)
- French Open: 4R (1980)
- Wimbledon: 2R (1981)
- US Open: 2R (1979)

Doubles
- Career record: 297–180
- Career titles: 19
- Highest ranking: No. 4 (June 7, 1982)

Grand Slam doubles results
- Australian Open: SF (1982)
- French Open: W (1982)
- Wimbledon: SF (1982, 1984)
- US Open: SF (1981)

Grand Slam mixed doubles results
- US Open: F (1982, 1983)

Ferdi Taygan (born December 5, 1956) is a former professional tennis player from the United States. He is of Turkish and Belarusian descent.

Taygan enjoyed most of his tennis success while playing doubles. During his career, he won 19 doubles titles and finished runner-up an additional 20 times. Partnering with Sherwood Stewart, Taygan won the 1982 French Open doubles title. He achieved a career-high ATP doubles ranking of world No. 4. Taygan was also ranked the No. 1 team in the world with Sherwood Stewart and was the No. 2 doubles player in the Volvo Grand Prix final rankings in 1982.

== Career finals ==
=== Singles: 1 (1 runner-up) ===
Result	W–L	Date	Tournament	Surface	Opponent	Score
Loss	0–1	Jul 1975	Istanbul, Turkey	Clay	(Rhodesia) Colin Dowdeswell	1–6, 4–6, 2–6

=== Doubles: 39 (19 wins / 20 losses) ===
Result	W-L	Date	Tournament	Surface	Partner	Opponents	Score
Loss	0–1	Nov 1979	Bologna, Italy	Carpet (i)	(United States) Fritz Buehning	(United States) Peter Fleming (United States) John McEnroe	1–6, 1–6
Win	1–1	Mar 1980	Washington, D.C.-2, US	Carpet (i)	(United States) Brian Teacher	(South Africa) Kevin Curren (United States) Steve Denton	4–6, 6–3, 7–6
Loss	1–2	Aug 1980	Stowe, US	Hard	(Romania) Ilie Năstase	(United States) Robert Lutz (South Africa) Bernard Mitton	4–6, 3–6
Win	2–2	Oct 1980	Melbourne Indoor, Australia	Carpet (i)	(United States) Fritz Buehning	(United States) John Sadri (United States) Tim Wilkison	6–1, 6–2
Win	3–2	Nov 1980	Hong Kong	Hard	(United States) Peter Fleming	(United States) Bruce Manson (United States) Brian Teacher	7–5, 6–2
Loss	3–3	Nov 1980	Taipei, Taiwan	Carpet (i)	(United States) John Austin	(United States) Bruce Manson (United States) Brian Teacher	4–6, 0–6
Win	4–3	Nov 1980	Bangkok, Thailan	Carpet (i)	(United States) Brian Teacher	(Netherlands) Tom Okker (United States) Dick Stockton	7–6, 7–6
Win	5–3	Jan 1981	Auckland, New Zealand	Hard	(United States) Tim Wilkison	(United States) Tony Graham (United States) Bill Scanlon	7–5, 6–1
Win	6–3	Mar 1981	Rotterdam, Netherlands	Hard (i)	(United States) Fritz Buehning	(United States) Gene Mayer (United States) Sandy Mayer	7–6, 1–6, 6–4
Loss	6–4	Apr 1981	Los Angeles, US	Hard	(United States) John McEnroe	(United States) Tom Gullikson (United States) Butch Walts	4–6, 4–6
Loss	6–5	Jul 1981	Washington, D.C., US	Clay	(Czechoslovakia) Pavel Složil	(Mexico) Raúl Ramírez (United States) Van Winitsky	7–5, 6–7, 6–7
Loss	6–6	Aug 1981	North Conway, US	Clay	(Czechoslovakia) Pavel Složil	(Switzerland) Heinz Günthardt (Australia) Peter McNamara	7–6, 5–7, 4–6
Win	7–6	Aug 1981	Montreal, Canada	Hard	(Mexico) Raúl Ramírez	(United States) Peter Fleming (United States) John McEnroe	2–6, 7–6, 6–4
Win	8–6	Aug 1981	Cincinnati, US	Hard	(United States) John McEnroe	(United States) Robert Lutz (United States) Stan Smith	7–6, 6–3
Loss	8–7	Oct 1981	Sydney Indoor, Australia	Hard (i)	(United States) Sherwood Stewart	(United States) Peter Fleming (United States) John McEnroe	7–6, 6–7, 1–6
Loss	8–8	Oct 1981	Melbourne Indoor, Australia	Hard (i)	(United States) Sherwood Stewart	(Australia) Paul Kronk (Australia) Peter McNamara	6–3, 3–6, 4–6
Loss	8–9	Nov 1981	Stockholm, Sweden	Hard (i)	(United States) Sherwood Stewart	(South Africa) Kevin Curren (United States) Steve Denton	7–6, 4–6, 0–6
Win	9–9	Nov 1981	Wembley, UK	Carpet (i)	(United States) Sherwood Stewart	(United States) Peter Fleming (United States) John McEnroe	7–5, 6–7, 6–4
Win	10–9	Jan 1982	Mexico City WCT, Mexico	Carpet (i)	(United States) Sherwood Stewart	(Czechoslovakia) Tomáš Šmíd (Hungary) Balázs Taróczy	6–4, 7–5
Loss	10–10	Jan 1982	Philadelphia, US	Carpet (i)	(United States) Sherwood Stewart	(United States) Peter Fleming (United States) John McEnroe	6–7, 4–6
Win	11–10	Apr 1982	Los Angeles, United States	Hard	(United States) Sherwood Stewart	(United States) Bruce Manson (United States) Brian Teacher	6–1, 6–7, 6–3
Win	12–10	Apr 1982	Las Vegas, United States	Hard	(United States) Sherwood Stewart	(Brazil) Carlos Kirmayr (United States) Van Winitsky	7–6, 6–4
Win	13–10	Jun 1982	French Open, Paris	Clay	(United States) Sherwood Stewart	(Chile) Hans Gildemeister (Chile) Belus Prajoux	7–5, 6–3, 1–1, RET.
Win	14–10	Jul 1982	Gstaad, Switzerland	Clay	(United States) Sandy Mayer	(Switzerland) Heinz Günthardt (Switzerland) Markus Günthardt	6–2, 6–3
Win	15–10	Aug 1982	North Conway, US	Clay	(United States) Sherwood Stewart	(Peru) Pablo Arraya (United States) Eric Fromm	6–2, 7–6
Win	16–10	Aug 1982	Indianapolis, US	Clay	(United States) Sherwood Stewart	(South Africa) Robbie Venter (United States) Blaine Willenborg	6–4, 7–5
Win	17–10	Oct 1982	Tokyo Outdoor, Japan	Clay	(United States) Sherwood Stewart	(United States) Tim Gullikson (United States) Tom Gullikson	6–1, 3–6, 7–6
Loss	17–11	Nov 1982	Stockholm, Sweden	Hard (i)	(United States) Sherwood Stewart	(United States) Mark Dickson (Sweden) Jan Gunnarsson	6–7, 7–6, 4–6
Loss	17–12	Nov 1982	São Paulo, Brazil	Clay	(Australia) Peter McNamara	(Brazil) Carlos Kirmayr (Brazil) Cássio Motta	3–6, 1–6
Loss	17–13	Jan 1983	Masters, New York City	Carpet (i)	(United States) Sherwood Stewart	(United States) Peter Fleming (United States) John McEnroe	5–7, 3–6
Loss	17–14	Apr 1983	Lisbon, Portugal	Clay	(Czechoslovakia) Pavel Složil	(Brazil) Carlos Kirmayr (Brazil) Cássio Motta	5–7, 4–6
Loss	17–15	Apr 1983	Los Angeles, US	Hard	(United States) Sandy Mayer	(United States) Peter Fleming (United States) John McEnroe	1–6, 2–6
Loss	17–16	Jul 1983	Washington, D.C., US	Clay	(Australia) Paul McNamee	(United States) Mark Dickson (Brazil) Cássio Motta	2–6, 6–1, 4–6
Win	18–16	Aug 1983	Montreal, Canada	Hard	(United States) Sandy Mayer	(United States) Tim Gullikson (United States) Tom Gullikson	6–3, 6–4
Loss	18–17	Feb 1984	La Quinta, US	Hard	(United States) Scott Davis	(South Africa) Bernard Mitton (United States) Butch Walts	7–5, 3–6, 2–6
Loss	18–18	Mar 1984	Madrid, Spain	Carpet (i)	(United States) Fritz Buehning	(United States) Peter Fleming (United States) John McEnroe	3–6, 3–6
Loss	18–19	Mar 1984	Rotterdam, Netherlands	Carpet (i)	(United States) Fritz Buehning	(South Africa) Kevin Curren (Poland) Wojtek Fibak	4–6, 4–6
Loss	18–20	Jul 1984	Stuttgart Outdoor, Germany	Clay	(United States) Fritz Buehning	(United States) Sandy Mayer (West Germany) Andreas Maurer	6–7, 4–6
Win	19–20	Jul 1984	Washington, D.C., US	Clay	(Czechoslovakia) Pavel Složil	(United States) Drew Gitlin (United States) Blaine Willenborg	7–6, 6–1

== Personal life ==
Ferdi Taygan was born in Worcester, Massachusetts to a Turkish father and a mother of Belarusian descent. His father Beyazıt immigrated to the United States to study civil engineering.

Taygan married Kay Conaway of Birmingham, Alabama in 1983. They have two daughters: Nuray, born November 18, 1984, and Shenal, born August 6, 1988.
