= Pavel Složil =

Czech professional tennis player and coach

- Country (sports): Czechoslovakia
- Born: 29 December 1955 (age 70) Opava, Czechoslovakia
- Height: 1.73 m (5 ft 8 in)
- Plays: Right-handed
- Prize money: $925,242

Singles
- Career record: 144–163
- Career titles: 2
- Highest ranking: No. 35 (12 November 1984)

Grand Slam singles results
- French Open: 3R (1982)
- US Open: 2R (1985, 1986)

Doubles
- Career record: 360–155
- Career titles: 32
- Highest ranking: No. 4 (18 February 1985)

Grand Slam doubles results
- French Open: F (1984)
- Wimbledon: SF (1986)

Grand Slam mixed doubles results
- French Open: W (1978)
Medal record
Summer Universiade
Gold medal – first place	1977 Sofia	Doubles
Gold medal – first place	1977 Sofia	Mixed Doubles

Pavel Složil (born 29 December 1955) is a former coach and a professional tennis player from Czechoslovakia. In 1985, Složil achieved a career-high doubles ranking of world No. 4.

== Career ==
Složil enjoyed most of his tennis success while playing doubles. During his career, he won 32 doubles titles and finished runner-up an additional 29 times, including at the French Open in 1984.

Slozil and his partner, Renata Tomanová (also from Czechoslovakia), won the 1978 French Open mixed-doubles championship, defeating Virginia Ruzici (Romania) and Patrice Dominguez (France). The mixed doubles championship was an important event in those days, contested by top players, with John McEnroe and Mary Carillo having won the year before.

Složil participated in eleven Davis Cup ties for Czechoslovakia from 1978 to 1986, posting a 7–2 record in doubles and a 4–2 record in singles. He was a member of the winning Czech Davis Cup team in 1980, along with teammates Ivan Lendl, Tomáš Šmíd and Jan Kodeš.

== Coaching ==
Složil served as Steffi Graf's coach from November 1986 until the end of 1991. Shortly after the start of his tenure as Graf's coach, she had her Grand Slam breakthrough year in 1987, winning six tournaments and then defeating Martina Navratilova in the French Open. Graf went on to be a finalist at Wimbledon and the US Open, losing both times to Navratilova. The next year, Graf achieved a calendar year's Grand Slam, a feat performed only twice before. She also won the 1988 Olympics singles and the Wimbledon ladies' doubles that same year.

From 1987 through 1991, coached by Složil, Graf won ten Grand Slam singles championships, winning the Australian Open (1988–89-90), the French Open (1987–88), Wimbledon (1988–89-91) and the US Open (1988–89), plus numerous side tournaments.

He subsequently served as coach for Jennifer Capriati, Anna Kournikova and Magdalena Maleeva between 1992 and 1999.

In 2002, he began work at the World Tennis Club in Naples, Florida. He served there as Tennis Director until 2014 when he began coaching and teaching at the Sanchez-Casal Tennis Academy, also in Naples. There he worked with the junior players in the morning and continues to teach tennis to a wide range of players.

== Career finals ==
=== Singles: 5 (2 titles / 3 runner-ups) ===
Result	W-L	Date	Tournament	Surface	Opponent	Score
Loss	0–1	Jul 1979	Kitzbühel, Austria	Clay	(United States) Vitas Gerulaitis	2–6, 2–6, 4–6
Win	1–1	Mar 1981	Nancy, France	Carpet (i)	(Romania) Ilie Năstase	6–2, 7–5
Loss	1–2	Feb 1983	Delray Beach WCT, U.S.	Clay	(Argentina) Guillermo Vilas	1–6, 4–6, 0–6
Loss	1–3	Oct 1984	Vienna, Austria	Carpet (i)	(United States) Tim Wilkison	1–6, 1–6, 2–6
Win	2–3	Aug 1985	Kitzbühel, Austria	Clay	(West Germany) Michael Westphal	7–5, 6–2

=== Doubles: 61 (32 titles / 29 runner-ups) ===
Result	W-L	Date	Tournament	Surface	Partner	Opponents	Score
Loss	0–1	Jul 1978	Kitzbühel, Austria	Clay	(Czechoslovakia) Pavel Hutka	(United States) Mike Fishbach (New Zealand) Chris Lewis	7–6, 4–6, 3–6
Loss	0–2	Oct 1978	Madrid, Spain	Clay	(Czechoslovakia) Tomáš Šmíd	(Poland) Wojciech Fibak (Czechoslovakia) Jan Kodeš	7–6, 1–6, 2–6
Loss	0–3	Apr 1979	Nice, France	Clay	(Czechoslovakia) Tomáš Šmíd	(Australia) Peter McNamara (Australia) Paul McNamee	1–6, 6–3, 2–6
Loss	0–4	1979	Florence, Italy	Clay	(Czechoslovakia) Ivan Lendl	(Italy) Paolo Bertolucci (Italy) Adriano Panatta	4–6, 3–6
Loss	0–5	1979	Stuttgart Outdoor, Germany	Clay	(Poland) Wojciech Fibak	(Switzerland) Colin Dowdeswell (South Africa) Frew McMillan	4–6, 2–6, 6–2, 4–6
Loss	0–6	1979	Cologne, Germany	Carpet (i)	(Switzerland) Heinz Günthardt	(United States) Gene Mayer (United States) Stan Smith	3–6, 4–6
Loss	0–7	1980	Vienna, Austria	Clay	(Czechoslovakia) Tomáš Šmíd	(Italy) Gianni Ocleppo (France) Christophe Roger-Vasselin	def.
Loss	0–8	1980	Barcelona, Spain	Clay	(Hungary) Balázs Taróczy	(United States) Steve Denton (Czechoslovakia) Ivan Lendl	2–6, 7–6, 3–6
Loss	0–9	1980	Vienna, Austria	Carpet (i)	(Switzerland) Heinz Günthardt	(United States) Bob Lutz (United States) Stan Smith	1–6, 2–6
Loss	0–10	1981	Linz, Austria	Hard (i)	(Australia) Brad Drewett	(Sweden) Anders Järryd (Sweden) Hans Simonsson	4–6, 6–7
Loss	0–11	1981	Nice, France	Clay	(New Zealand) Chris Lewis	(France) Yannick Noah (France) Pascal Portes	6–4, 3–6, 4–6
Loss	0–12	1981	Monte Carlo, Monaco	Clay	(Czechoslovakia) Tomáš Šmíd	(Switzerland) Heinz Günthardt (Hungary) Balázs Taróczy	3–6, 3–6
Win	1–12	1981	Florence, Italy	Clay	(Mexico) Raúl Ramírez	(Italy) Paolo Bertolucci (Italy) Adriano Panatta	6–3, 3–6, 6–3
Win	2–12	1981	Boston, U.S.	Clay	(Mexico) Raúl Ramírez	(Chile) Hans Gildemeister (Ecuador) Andrés Gómez	6–4, 7–6
Loss	2–13	1981	Washington, D.C., U.S.	Hard	(United States) Ferdi Taygan	(Mexico) Raúl Ramírez (United States) Van Winitsky	7–5, 6–7, 6–7
Loss	2–14	1981	North Conway, U.S.	Clay	(United States) Ferdi Taygan	(Switzerland) Heinz Günthardt (Australia) Peter McNamara	7–6, 5–7, 4–6
Loss	2–15	1981	Geneva, Switzerland	Clay	(Czechoslovakia) Tomáš Šmíd	(Switzerland) Heinz Günthardt (Hungary) Balázs Taróczy	4–6, 6–3, 2–6
Loss	2–16	1981	Basel, Switzerland	Hard (i)	(Switzerland) Markus Günthardt	(Argentina) José Luis Clerc (Romania) Ilie Năstase	6–7, 7–6, 6–7
Win	3–16	1982	Genova WCT, Italy	Carpet (i)	(Czechoslovakia) Tomáš Šmíd	(United States) Mike Cahill (United Kingdom) Buster Mottram	6–7, 7–5, 6–3
Win	4–16	1982	Brussels, Belgium	Carpet (i)	(United States) Sherwood Stewart	(United States) Tracy Delatte (United States) Chris Dunk	6–4, 6–7, 7–5
Win	5–16	1982	Madrid, Spain	Clay	(Czechoslovakia) Tomáš Šmíd	(Switzerland) Heinz Günthardt (Hungary) Balázs Taróczy	6–1, 3–6, 9–7
Win	6–16	1982	Hamburg, Germany	Clay	(Czechoslovakia) Tomáš Šmíd	(Sweden) Anders Järryd (Sweden) Hans Simonsson	6–4, 6–3
Loss	6–17	1982	Kitzbühel, Austria	Clay	(Australia) Rod Frawley	(Australia) Mark Edmondson (Australia) Kim Warwick	6–4, 4–6, 3–6
Loss	6–18	1982	Cap d'Agde WCT, France	Clay	(Czechoslovakia) Tomáš Šmíd	(United States) Andy Andrews (United States) Drew Gitlin	2–6, 4–6
Win	7–18	1982	Geneva, Switzerland	Clay	(Czechoslovakia) Tomáš Šmíd	(Australia) Carl Limberger (South Africa) Mike Myburg	6–4, 6–0
Loss	7–19	1982	Basel, Switzerland	Hard (i)	(United States) Fritz Buehning	(France) Henri Leconte (France) Yannick Noah	2–6, 2–6
Win	8–19	1982	Vienna, Austria	Carpet (i)	(France) Henri Leconte	(United States) Mark Dickson (United States) Terry Moor	6–1, 7–6
Win	9–19	1982	Dortmund WCT, Germany	Carpet (i)	(Czechoslovakia) Tomáš Šmíd	(United States) Mike Cahill (Paraguay) Francisco González	6–2, 6–7, 6–1
Win	10–19	1982	Toulouse, France	Carpet (i)	(Czechoslovakia) Tomáš Šmíd	(France) Jean-Louis Haillet (France) Yannick Noah	6–4, 6–4
Win	11–19	1983	Richmond WCT, U.S.	Carpet (i)	(Czechoslovakia) Tomáš Šmíd	(United States) Fritz Buehning (United States) Brian Teacher	6–2, 6–4
Win	12–19	1983	Delray Beach WCT, U.S.	Clay	(Czechoslovakia) Tomáš Šmíd	(India) Anand Amritraj (United States) Johan Kriek	7–6, 6–4
Loss	12–20	1983	Rotterdam, Netherlands	Carpet (i)	(United States) Peter Fleming	(United States) Fritz Buehning (United States) Tom Gullikson	6–7, 6–4, 6–7
Win	13–20	1983	Milan, Italy	Carpet (i)	(Czechoslovakia) Tomáš Šmíd	(United States) Fritz Buehning (United States) Peter Fleming	6–2, 5–7, 6–4
Loss	13–21	1983	Lisbon, Portugal	Clay	(United States) Ferdi Taygan	(Brazil) Carlos Kirmayr (Brazil) Cássio Motta	5–7, 4–6
Win	14–21	1983	Madrid, Spain	Clay	(Switzerland) Heinz Günthardt	(Switzerland) Markus Günthardt (Hungary) Zoltán Kuhárszky	6–3, 6–3
Win	15–21	1983	Munich, Germany	Clay	(New Zealand) Chris Lewis	(Sweden) Anders Järryd (Czechoslovakia) Tomáš Šmíd	6–4, 6–2
Win	16–21	1983	Gstaad, Switzerland	Clay	(Czechoslovakia) Tomáš Šmíd	(United Kingdom) Colin Dowdeswell (Poland) Wojciech Fibak	6–7, 6–4, 6–2
Loss	16–22	1983	Stuttgart Outdoor, Germany	Clay	(Czechoslovakia) Tomáš Šmíd	(India) Anand Amritraj (United States) Mike Bauer	6–4, 3–6, 2–6
Win	17–22	1983	Kitzbühel, Austria	Clay	(Poland) Wojciech Fibak	(United Kingdom) Colin Dowdeswell (Hungary) Zoltán Kuhárszky	7–5, 6–2
Win	18–22	1983	Basel, Switzerland	Hard (i)	(Czechoslovakia) Tomáš Šmíd	(Sweden) Stefan Edberg (Romania) Florin Segărceanu	6–1, 3–6, 7–6
Win	19–22	1983	Toulouse, France	Carpet (i)	(Switzerland) Heinz Günthardt	(South Africa) Bernard Mitton (United States) Butch Walts	5–7, 7–5, 6–4
Win	20–22	1984	Masters Doubles WCT, London	Carpet (i)	(Czechoslovakia) Tomáš Šmíd	(Sweden) Anders Järryd (Sweden) Hans Simonsson	1–6, 6–3, 3–6, 6–1, 6–3
Win	21–22	1984	Milan, Italy	Carpet (i)	(Czechoslovakia) Tomáš Šmíd	(South Africa) Kevin Curren (United States) Steve Denton	6–4, 6–3
Loss	21–23	1984	French Open, Paris	Clay	(Czechoslovakia) Tomáš Šmíd	(France) Henri Leconte (France) Yannick Noah	4–6, 6–2, 6–3, 3–6, 2–6
Win	22–23	1984	Washington, D.C., U.S.	Clay	(United States) Ferdi Taygan	(United States) Drew Gitlin (United States) Blaine Willenborg	7–6, 6–1
Win	23–23	1984	Bordeaux, France	Clay	(United States) Blaine Willenborg	(France) Loïc Courteau (France) Guy Forget	6–1, 6–4
Win	24–23	1984	Barcelona, Spain	Clay	(Czechoslovakia) Tomáš Šmíd	(Argentina) Martín Jaite (Paraguay) Víctor Pecci	6–2, 6–0
Win	25–23	1984	Basel, Switzerland	Hard (i)	(Czechoslovakia) Tomáš Šmíd	(Sweden) Stefan Edberg (United States) Tim Wilkison	7–6, 6–2
Loss	25–24	1984	Wembley, England	Carpet (i)	(Czechoslovakia) Tomáš Šmíd	(Ecuador) Andrés Gómez (Czechoslovakia) Ivan Lendl	2–6, 2–6
Win	26–24	1984	Treviso, Italy	Clay	(United States) Tim Wilkison	(Sweden) Jan Gunnarsson (United States) Sherwood Stewart	6–2, 6–3
Loss	26–25	1984	Toulouse, France	Carpet (i)	(United States) Tim Wilkison	(Sweden) Jan Gunnarsson (Denmark) Michael Mortensen	4–6, 2–6
Loss	26–26	1984	Masters, New York	Carpet (i)	(Czechoslovakia) Tomáš Šmíd	(United States) Peter Fleming (United States) John McEnroe	2–6, 2–6
Win	27–26	1985	Memphis, U.S.	Hard (i)	(Czechoslovakia) Tomáš Šmíd	(South Africa) Kevin Curren (United States) Steve Denton	1–6, 6–3, 6–4
Win	28–26	1985	Rotterdam, Netherlands	Carpet (i)	(Czechoslovakia) Tomáš Šmíd	(United States) Vitas Gerulaitis (Australia) Paul McNamee	6–4, 6–4
Win	29–26	1985	Monte Carlo, Monaco	Clay	(Czechoslovakia) Tomáš Šmíd	(Israel) Shlomo Glickstein (Israel) Shahar Perkiss	6–2, 6–3
Win	30–26	1985	Nice, France	Clay	(Italy) Claudio Panatta	(France) Loïc Courteau (France) Guy Forget	3–6, 6–3, 8–6
Loss	30–27	1985	Indianapolis, U.S.	Clay	(Australia) Kim Warwick	(United States) Ken Flach (United States) Robert Seguso	4–6, 4–6
Loss	30–28	1985	Toulouse, France	Carpet (i)	(Czechoslovakia) Tomáš Šmíd	(Chile) Ricardo Acuña (Switzerland) Jakob Hlasek	6–3, 2–6, 7–9
Win	31–28	1986	Nice, France	Clay	(Switzerland) Jakob Hlasek	(United States) Gary Donnelly (United Kingdom) Colin Dowdeswell	6–3, 4–6, 11–9
Win	32–28	1986	Saint Vincent, Italy	Clay	(Belgium) Libor Pimek	(United States) Bud Cox (Australia) Michael Fancutt	6–3, 6–3
Loss	32–29	1986	Toulouse, France	Carpet (i)	(Switzerland) Jakob Hlasek	(Czechoslovakia) Miloslav Mečíř (Czechoslovakia) Tomáš Šmíd	2–6, 6–3, 4–6
