= José Higueras =

Spanish tennis player and coach

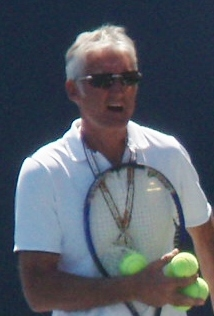
- Country (sports): Spain
- Residence: Palm Springs, California, U.S.
- Born: 1 March 1953 (age 73) Diezma, Spain
- Height: 1.78 m (5 ft 10 in)
- Turned pro: 1973 (amateur from 1970)
- Retired: 1986
- Plays: Right-handed (one-handed backhand)
- Prize money: US$1,406,355

Singles
- Career record: 453–243
- Career titles: 21 (ATP 16, ITF 5)
- Highest ranking: No. 6 (13 June 1983)

Grand Slam singles results
- French Open: SF (1982, 1983)
- Wimbledon: 2R (1974, 1979)
- US Open: 4R (1977)

Other tournaments
- Tour Finals: QF (1983)

Doubles
- Career record: 119–164
- Career titles: 3

José Higueras
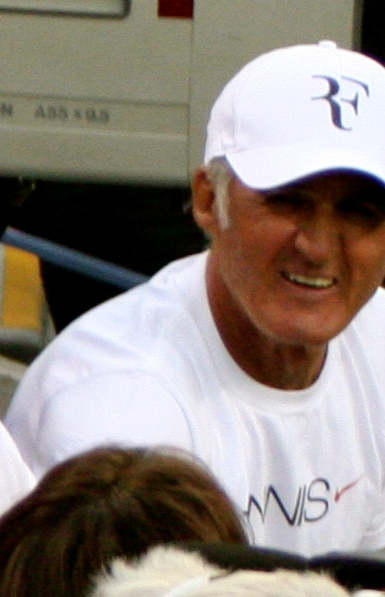

Singles
- Career record: 454–234

Doubles
- Career record: 123–167

Coaching career (1989–)
- Michael Chang(1989); Jim Courier(1990–1997); Sergi Bruguera(1997–1999); Todd Martin(1999–2004); Carlos Moyá(2001–2002); Pete Sampras (2002)); Dmitry Tursunov(2004–2006); Guillermo Coria (2006); Roger Federer (2008); Robby Ginepri(2008–2010); Shahar Pe'er (2006–2008); Alberto Francis 2010– Jennifer Singian 2010– Luis-Manuel Flores 2010–

Coaching achievements
- Coachee singles titles total: 1(Ch)-18(C)-1(M)-2(F)
- Coachee doubles titles total: 4(C)-1(M)-1(P)
- List of notable tournaments (with champion) 1989 French Open (Chang) (United States) 1992 1995 Davis Cup champion (Courier); 1991 1992 French Open (Courier); 1992 1993 Australian Open (Cour); 1992 1993 Rome Masters (Cour.); 1991 (S, D) 1993 Indian Wells Masters (Courier); 1991 Miami Masters (Courier); 1990 Hamburg Masters (Courier D.); 1993 Canada Masters (Courier D.); 2002 Cincinnati Masters(Martin D) (Russia) 2006 Davis Cup champion (Tursunov); 2007 Bank of the West Classic (Peer Doubles); 2008 US Open (Federer)

Coaching awards and records
- Records Youngest Grand Slam winner (Chang)

José Higueras (Spanish pronunciation: [xoˈsejˈɣeɾas]; born 1 March 1953) is a tennis coach and former professional tennis player from Spain.

Between 1976 and 1984, Higueras won 16 top-level singles titles. A semi-finalist at the French Open in 1982 and 1983, he reached a career-high singles ranking of world No. 6 in 1983. He was also a member of the Spanish team which won the inaugural World Team Cup in 1978.

Higueras retired from the professional tour in 1986. After retiring as a player, he became a successful tennis coach. He helped coach Michael Chang to the 1989 French Open title, and later, along with Brad Stine, coached Jim Courier to help him reach the world No. 1 singles ranking in 1992, as well as coaching Courier to two French Open titles (1991 and 1992) and two Australian Open titles (1992 and 1993). Higueras has also coached Todd Martin, Sergi Bruguera, Carlos Moyá, Pete Sampras, Dmitry Tursunov, Guillermo Coria, Robby Ginepri, Roger Federer and Shahar Pe'er, and created the José Higueras Tennis Training Center in Palm Springs, California, where he resides.

In 2008, already the coach of Robby Ginepri, Higueras was hired by Roger Federer to help him through the clay court season. The partnership was extended during the grass court and hard court season. Higueras was chosen to become the director of coaching for elite player development at the United States Tennis Association (USTA) in September 2008.

== Career finals ==
=== Singles: 28 (16 titles / 12 runner-ups) ===
Result	W-L	Date	Tournament	Surface	Opponent	Score
Loss	0–1	Jul 1975	Båstad, Sweden	Clay	(Spain) Manuel Orantes	0–6, 3–6
Loss	0–2	Nov 1976	São Paulo, Brazil	Carpet	(Argentina) Guillermo Vilas	3–6, 0–6
Win	1–2	Dec 1976	Santiago, Chile	Clay	(Brazil) Carlos Kirmayr	5–7, 6–4, 6–4
Win	2–2	Apr 1977	Murcia, Spain	Clay	(United Kingdom) Buster Mottram	6–4, 6–0, 6–3
Loss	2–3	Nov 1977	Bogotá, Colombia	Clay	(Argentina) Guillermo Vilas	1–6, 2–6, 3–6
Win	3–3	Mar 1978	Cairo, Egypt	Clay	(Sweden) Kjell Johansson	4–6, 6–4, 6–4
Win	4–3	Apr 1978	Nice, France	Clay	(France) Yannick Noah	6–3, 6–4, 6–4
Loss	4–4	Aug 1978	Indianapolis, U.S.	Clay	(United States) Jimmy Connors	0–6, 3–6
Win	5–4	Sep 1978	Bournemouth, England	Clay	(Italy) Paolo Bertolucci	6–2, 6–1, 6–3
Win	6–4	Oct 1978	Madrid, Spain	Clay	(Czechoslovakia) Tomáš Šmíd	6–7, 6–3, 6–3, 6–4
Win	7–4	Apr 1979	Houston, U.S.	Clay	(United States) Gene Mayer	6–3, 2–6, 7–6
Win	8–4	May 1979	Hamburg, Germany	Clay	(United States) Harold Solomon	3–6, 6–1, 6–4, 6–1
Loss	8–5	Aug 1979	North Conway, U.S.	Clay	(United States) Harold Solomon	7–5, 4–6, 6–7
Win	9–5	Aug 1979	Boston, U.S.	Clay	(Chile) Hans Gildemeister	6–3, 6–1
Loss	9–6	Nov 1979	Quito, Ecuador	Clay	(Paraguay) Víctor Pecci	6–2, 4–6, 2–6
Loss	9–7	Dec 1979	Santiago, Chile	Clay	(Chile) Hans Gildemeister	5–7, 7–5, 4–6
Loss	9–8	Feb 1981	Viña del Mar, Chile	Clay	(Paraguay) Víctor Pecci	4–6, 0–6
Loss	9–9	Mar 1982	Linz, Austria	Clay	(Sweden) Anders Järryd	4–6, 6–4, 4–6
Win	10–9	May 1982	Hamburg, Germany	Clay	(Australia) Peter McNamara	6–4, 7–6, 6–7, 3–6, 7–6
Loss	10–10	Aug 1982	North Conway, U.S.	Clay	(Czechoslovakia) Ivan Lendl	3–6, 2–6
Win	11–10	Aug 1982	Indianapolis, U.S.	Clay	(United States) Jimmy Arias	7–5, 5–7, 6–3
Win	12–10	Feb 1983	La Quinta, U.S.	Hard	(United States) Eliot Teltscher	6–4, 6–2
Win	13–10	Apr 1983	Bournemouth, England	Clay	(Czechoslovakia) Tomáš Šmíd	2–6, 7–6, 7–5
Loss	13–11	May 1983	Hamburg, Germany	Clay	(France) Yannick Noah	6–3, 5–7, 2–6, 0–6
Loss	13–12	May 1983	Rome, Italy	Clay	(United States) Jimmy Arias	2–6, 7–6, 1–6, 4–6
Win	14–12	Jul 1983	Stuttgart Outdoor, Germany	Clay	(Switzerland) Heinz Günthardt	6–1, 6–1, 7–6
Win	15–12	Jul 1984	Kitzbühel, Austria	Clay	(Paraguay) Víctor Pecci	7–5, 3–6, 6–1
Win	16–12	Sep 1984	Bordeaux, France	Clay	(Italy) Francesco Cancellotti	7–5, 6–1

=== Doubles: 5 (3 titles / 2 runner-ups) ===
Result	W-L	Date	Tournament	Surface	Partner	Opponents	Score
Win	1–0	Jul 1974	Gstaad, Switzerland	Clay	(Spain) Manuel Orantes	(Australia) Roy Emerson (Brazil) Thomaz Koch	7–5, 0–6, 6–1, 9–8
Loss	1–1	Mar 1975	Rotterdam WCT, Netherlands	Carpet	(Hungary) Balázs Taróczy	(South Africa) Bob Hewitt (South Africa) Frew McMillan	2–6, 2–6
Win	2–2	Jul 1977	Hilversum, Netherlands	Clay	(Spain) Antonio Muñoz	(France) Jean-Louis Haillet (France) François Jauffret	6–1, 6–4, 2–6, 6–1
Win	3–1	Apr 1978	Milan WCT, Italy	Carpet	(Paraguay) Víctor Pecci	(Poland) Wojtek Fibak (Mexico) Raúl Ramírez	5–7, 7–6, 7–6
Loss	3–2	Jun 1978	French Open, Paris	Clay	(Spain) Manuel Orantes	(United States) Gene Mayer (United States) Hank Pfister	3–6, 2–6, 2–6
