= 1980 Benson and Hedges Open – Doubles =

Doubles
- 1980 Benson and Hedges Open

Final
- Champions: (Austria) Peter Feigl (Australia) Rod Frawley
- Runners-up: (United States) John Sadri (United States) Tim Wilkison
- Score: 6–2, 7–5

Details
- Draw: 16
- Seeds: 4

Events
Singles	Doubles
- ATP Auckland Open

Bernard Mitton and Kim Warwick were the defending champions, but none competed this year. Warwick chose to compete at the Australian Open the previous week, losing in the first round.

Peter Feigl and Rod Frawley won the title by defeating John Sadri and Tim Wilkison 6–2, 7–5 in the final.

== Seeds ==
1. (United States) John Sadri / (United States) Tim Wilkison (final)
2. (Austria) Peter Feigl / (Australia) Rod Frawley (champions)
3. (Australia) Dale Collings / (Australia) Dick Crealy (semifinals)
4. (Australia) Steve Docherty / (New Zealand) Chris Lewis (quarterfinals)

== Draw ==
Key

- Q = Qualifier
- WC = Wild card
- LL = Lucky loser
- Alt = Alternate
- ITF = ITF entry
- PR = Protected ranking
- SR = Special ranking
- SE = Special exempt
- JE = Junior exempt
- JR = Junior Accelerator Programme entrant
- CO = College Accelerator Programme entrant
- NG = Next Gen Accelerator Program entrant
- w/o = Walkover
- r = Retired
- d = Defaulted

=== Draw ===
First round
1	(United States) J Sadri (United States) T Wilkison	7	6
(United States) Doug Ditmer (United States) R Evett	5	4
(New Zealand) B Derlin (New Zealand) M Lewis	6	7
(Austria) G. Ewinizky (Austria) F Krajcik	4	6
3	(Australia) D Collings (Australia) D Crealy	7	6
(New Zealand) Peter Langsford (New Zealand) Paul Smith	6	3
(New Zealand) C Gunning (United States) C Stansbury	6	6
(New Zealand) D Mustard (New Zealand) Stephen Temple	4	2
(New Zealand) Steve Harley (New Zealand) Brett Hibbert	6	4	6
(New Zealand) Jay Harvey (South Africa) P Lamb	4	6	4
(New Zealand) Carey Brading (United States) K. Curry	3	4
4	(Australia) S Docherty (New Zealand) C Lewis	6	6
(Australia) Glenn Ayre (Australia) Max Bates	7	6
(Australia) D Carter (New Zealand) Claude England	5	2
(United Kingdom) Chris Bradnam (New Zealand) Peter Hampton	3	2
2	(Austria) P Feigl (Australia) R Frawley	6	6

Quarterfinals
1	(United States) J Sadri (United States) T Wilkison	6	6
(New Zealand) B Derlin (New Zealand) M Lewis	3	3
3	(Australia) D Collings (Australia) D Crealy	6	6
(New Zealand) C Gunning (United States) C Stansbury	3	4
(New Zealand) S Harley (New Zealand) B Hibbert	6	6	6
4	(Australia) S Docherty (New Zealand) C Lewis	4	7	2
(Australia) G Ayre (Australia) M Bates	4	5
2	(Austria) P Feigl (Australia) R Frawley	6	7

Semifinals
1	(United States) J Sadri (United States) T Wilkison	6	6	7
3	(Australia) D Collings (Australia) D Crealy	7	4	5
(New Zealand) S Harley (New Zealand) B Hibbert	6	6	2
2	(Austria) P Feigl (Australia) R Frawley	3	7	6

Final
1	(United States) J Sadri (United States) T Wilkison	2	5
2	(Austria) P Feigl (Australia) R Frawley	6	7
