= 1980 Benson and Hedges Open – Singles =

Singles
- 1980 Benson and Hedges Open

Final
- Champion: (United States) John Sadri
- Runner-up: (United States) Tim Wilkison
- Score: 6–4, 3–6, 6–3, 6–4

Details
- Draw: 32
- Seeds: 8

Events
| Singles | Doubles |
| ← 1979 · | ATP Auckland Open | · 1981 → |

First-seeded John Sadri defeated Tim Wilkison 6–4, 3–6, 6–3, 6–4 to win the 1980 Benson and Hedges Open singles competition. Wilkison was the defending champion.

== Seeds ==
A champion seed is indicated in bold text while text in italics indicates the round in which that seed was eliminated.

1. (United States) John Sadri **(champion)**
2. (United States) Tim Wilkison (final)
3. (Austria) Peter Feigl (semifinals)
4. (Australia) Kim Warwick (second round)
5. (Australia) Rod Frawley (semifinals)
6. (Australia) Paul McNamee (quarterfinals)
7. (United States) Matt Mitchell (first round)
8. (Australia) Dale Collings (second round)

== Draw ==
=== Key ===
- Q - Qualifier
- NB: The Final was the best of 5 sets while all other rounds were the best of 3 sets.

=== Final ===
| Final |
| 1 | (United States) **John Sadri** | **6** | 3 | **6** | **6** |
| 2 | (United States) Tim Wilkison | 4 | **6** | 3 | 4 |

=== Section 1 ===
First round
1 | (United States) **J Sadri** | **6** | **6**
(Austria) F Krajcik | 3 | 2
(Australia) **D Carter** | 1 | **6** | **6**
Q | (South Africa) P Lamb | **6** | 1 | 4
(New Zealand) **R Simpson** | **6** | **7**
(New Zealand) C Gunning | 2 | 5
Q | (United States) **R Evett** | **6** | 3 | **6**
7 | (United States) M Mitchell | 3 | **6** | 0
4 | (Australia) **K Warwick** | **6** | **6**
(New Zealand) D Mustard | 1 | 1
(United States) **J Austin** | **6** | **6**
(New Zealand) C Lewis | 3 | 1
(New Zealand) **K Evernden** | **7** | **6**
Q | (New Zealand) J Simpson | 6 | 4
(Australia) J Harvey | 1 | 1
5 | (Australia) **R Frawley** | **6** | **6**

Second round
1 | (United States) **J Sadri** | **7** | **6**
(Australia) D Carter | 6 | 3
(New Zealand) **R Simpson** | **6** | **6**
Q | (United States) R Evett | 2 | 4
4 | (Australia) K Warwick | **6** | 4 | 4
(United States) **J Austin** | 4 | **6** | **6**
(New Zealand) K Evernden | 2 | 4
5 | (Australia) **R Frawley** | **6** | **6**

Quarterfinals
1 | (United States) **J Sadri** | **6** | **6**
(New Zealand) R Simpson | 4 | 3
(United States) J Austin | **6** | 4 | 5
5 | (Australia) **R Frawley** | 2 | **6** | **7**

Semifinals
1 | (United States) **J Sadri** | **6** | **6**
5 | (Australia) R Frawley | 1 | 3

=== Section 2 ===
First round
6 | (Australia) **P McNamee** | **6** | **6**
(United States) D Ditmer | 2 | 3
(New Zealand) **M Lewis** | **6** | **6**
Q | (New Zealand) B Hibbert | 4 | 3
(New Zealand) **P Hampton** | 1 | **6** | **6**
(Australia) B Gilmour | **6** | 1 | 1
(United States) C Stansbury | 1 | 4
3 | (Austria) **P Feigl** | **6** | **6**
8 | (Australia) **D Collings** | **6** | **7**
(New Zealand) B Derlin | 2 | 6
(Australia) **D Crealy** | **6** | **6**
(New Zealand) C England | 3 | 3
(Australia) **S Docherty** | **6** | **6**
(United Kingdom) C Bradnam | 2 | 4
(Australia) P Langsford | 6 | 0
2 | (United States) **T Wilkison** | **7** | **6**

Second round
6 | (Australia) **P McNamee** | **7** | **7**
(New Zealand) M Lewis | 6 | 6
(New Zealand) P Hampton | 5 | 1
3 | (Austria) **P Feigl** | **7** | **6**
8 | (Australia) D Collings | **6** | 0 | 7
(Australia) **D Crealy** | 4 | **6** | **9**
(Australia) S Docherty | **6** | 2 | 2
2 | (United States) **T Wilkison** | 2 | **6** | **6**

Quarterfinals
6 | (Australia) P McNamee | 3 | **6** | 3
3 | (Austria) **P Feigl** | **6** | 3 | **6**
(Australia) D Crealy | 2 | 6
2 | (United States) **T Wilkison** | **6** | **7**

Semifinals
3 | (Austria) P Feigl | **7** | 6 | 3
2 | (United States) **T Wilkison** | 6 | **7** | **6**
