= 1981 Australian Open – Men's doubles =

Men's doubles
- 1981 Australian Open

Final
- Champions: (Australia) Mark Edmondson (Australia) Kim Warwick
- Runners-up: (United States) Hank Pfister (United States) John Sadri
- Score: 6–3, 6–7, 6–3

Details
- Draw: 32
- Seeds: 8

Events
Singles	men	women		boys	girls
Doubles	men	women	mixed	boys	girls
WC Singles	men	women	quad
WC Doubles	men	women	quad
Legends	men	women	mixed
- Australian Open

The Men's doubles tournament at the 1981 Australian Open was held from 30 November through 6 December 1981 on the outdoor grass courts at the Kooyong Stadium in Melbourne, Australia. The fourth-seeded team of Mark Edmondson and Kim Warwick were the defending champions and retained their title by defeating Hank Pfister and John Sadri in the final, 6–3, 6–7, 6–3.

== Seeds ==
1. (Australia) Peter McNamara / (Australia) Paul McNamee (quarterfinals)
2. (South Africa) Kevin Curren / (United States) Steve Denton (semifinals)
3. (Switzerland) Heinz Günthardt / (Switzerland) Markus Günthardt (second round)
4. (Australia) Mark Edmondson / (Australia) Kim Warwick (champion)
5. (United States) Fritz Buehning / (Israel) Shlomo Glickstein (first round)
6. (United States) Peter Rennert / (New Zealand) Russell Simpson (second round)
7. (Australia) David Carter / (Australia) Paul Kronk (quarterfinals)
8. (Sweden) Anders Järryd / (Sweden) Hans Simonsson (first round)

== Draw ==
Key

- Q = Qualifier
- WC = Wild card
- LL = Lucky loser
- Alt = Alternate
- ITF = ITF entry
- PR = Protected ranking
- SR = Special ranking
- SE = Special exempt
- JE = Junior exempt
- JR = Junior Accelerator Programme entrant
- CO = College Accelerator Programme entrant
- NG = Next Gen Accelerator Program entrant
- w/o = Walkover
- r = Retired
- d = Defaulted

=== Finals ===
Semifinals
(United States) Hank Pfister (United States) John Sadri	6	6
(Australia) Syd Ball (United States) Steve Krulevitz	3	4
4	(Australia) Mark Edmondson (Australia) Kim Warwick	6	6	6
2	(South Africa) Kevin Curren (United States) Steve Denton	3	7	3

Final
(United States) Hank Pfister (United States) John Sadri	3	7	3
4	(Australia) Mark Edmondson (Australia) Kim Warwick	6	6	6

=== Top half ===
First round
1	(Australia) P McNamara (Australia) P McNamee	6	6
(United States) L Bourne (United States) M. Mitchell	4	4
(Australia) R Frawley (New Zealand) C. Lewis	7	6
WC	(Australia) C Johnstone (Australia) CA Miller	6	4
(United States) A Andrews (United States) D Gitlin	7	2	3
(Australia) D Collings (Australia) W Maher	6	6	6
(United States) H Pfister (United States) J Sadri	7	6	6
8	(Sweden) A Järryd (Sweden) H Simonsson	5	7	3
3	(Switzerland) H Günthardt (Switzerland) M Günthardt	6	6
WC	(Australia) P Cash (Australia) G Whitecross	4	4
(United States) C. Edwards (South Africa) E. Edwards	6	4	6
(United States) C Mayotte (United States) T Mayotte	4	6	3
(Australia) B Guan (Australia) W Hampson	3	6
(Australia) S Ball (United States) S Krulevitz	6	7
(United States) S Meister (New Zealand) J Simpson	3	4
6	(United States) P Rennert (New Zealand) R. Simpson	6	6

Second round
1	(Australia) P McNamara (Australia) P McNamee	7	6
(Australia) R Frawley (New Zealand) C. Lewis	6	3
(Australia) D Collings (Australia) W Maher	2	3
(United States) H Pfister (United States) J Sadri	6	6
3	(Switzerland) H Günthardt (Switzerland) M Günthardt	4	3
(United States) C. Edwards (South Africa) E. Edwards	6	6
(Australia) S Ball (United States) S Krulevitz	6	7
6	(United States) P Rennert (New Zealand) R. Simpson	4	6

Quarterfinals
1	(Australia) P McNamara (Australia) P McNamee	7	2	6
(United States) H Pfister (United States) J Sadri	6	6	7
(United States) C. Edwards (South Africa) E. Edwards	6	6
(Australia) S Ball (United States) S Krulevitz	7	7

Semifinals
(United States) H Pfister (United States) J Sadri	6	6
(Australia) S Ball (United States) S Krulevitz	3	4

=== Bottom half ===
First round
5	(United States) F Buehning (Israel) S Glickstein	7	2	5
(Australia) J. Alexander (Australia) P Dent	6	6	7
(South Africa) J Kriek (United States) T Wilkison	7	6	6
(United States) P DuPré (United States) M Estep	6	7	3
(Israel) D. Schneider (United States) D Siegler	4	4
(Australia) C. Letcher (United Kingdom) R. Lewis	6	6
(United States) M Davis (United States) C Dunk	6	3
4	(Australia) M Edmondson (Australia) K Warwick	7	6
7	(Australia) D. Carter (Australia) P Kronk	6	6
ALT	(United States) J. Bailey (Philippines) B Sison	3	4
(United Kingdom) A Jarrett (United Kingdom) J. Smith	6	7
(Australia) B Drewett (Australia) J. Fitzgerald	4	6
WC	(Australia) B Dyke (Australia) P. Johnston	6	5
(United States) L Stefanki (United States) R Van't Hof	7	7
(Australia) J. James (Australia) W Pascoe	1	4
2	(South Africa) K Curren (United States) S Denton	6	6

Second round
(Australia) J. Alexander (Australia) P Dent	3	6	6
(South Africa) J Kriek (United States) T Wilkison	6	3	7
(Australia) C Letcher (United Kingdom) R. Lewis	4	4
4	(Australia) M Edmondson (Australia) K Warwick	6	6
7	(Australia) D. Carter (Australia) P Kronk	6	6
(United Kingdom) A Jarrett (United Kingdom) J. Smith	3	4
(United States) L Stefanki (United States) R Van't Hof	6	2
2	(South Africa) K Curren (United States) S Denton	7	6

Quarterfinals
(South Africa) J Kriek (United States) T Wilkison	4	5
4	(Australia) M Edmondson (Australia) K Warwick	6	7
7	(Australia) D. Carter (Australia) P Kronk	0r
2	(South Africa) K Curren (United States) S Denton	4

Semifinals
4	(Australia) M Edmondson (Australia) K Warwick	6	6	6
2	(South Africa) K Curren (United States) S Denton	3	7	3
