= 1982 Mercedes Cup – Singles =

Singles
- 1982 Mercedes Cup

Final
- Champion: (India) Ramesh Krishnan
- Runner-up: (United States) Sandy Mayer
- Score: 5–7, 6–3, 6–3, 7–6

Details
- Draw: 32 (4Q)
- Seeds: 8

Events
| Singles | Doubles |
- Stuttgart Open

Björn Borg was the defending champion, but did not play that year. Borg would eventually retire from professional tennis in January 1983, after playing only one tournament in the entire season at Monte Carlo.

Unseeded Ramesh Krishnan won the title by defeating Sandy Mayer 5–7, 6–3, 6–3, 7–6 in the final.

== Seeds ==
1. (United States) Sandy Mayer (final)
2. (United States) Brian Teacher (first round)
3. (Australia) Mark Edmondson (first round)
4. (United Kingdom) Buster Mottram (second round)
5. (New Zealand) Chris Lewis (quarterfinals)
6. (West Germany) Andreas Maurer (second round)
7. (New Zealand) Russell Simpson (first round)
8. (West Germany) Peter Elter (semifinals)

== Draw ==
Key

- Q = Qualifier
- WC = Wild card
- LL = Lucky loser
- Alt = Alternate
- ITF = ITF entry
- PR = Protected ranking
- SR = Special ranking
- SE = Special exempt
- JE = Junior exempt
- JR = Junior Accelerator Programme entrant
- CO = College Accelerator Programme entrant
- NG = Next Gen Accelerator Program entrant
- w/o = Walkover
- r = Retired
- d = Defaulted

=== Finals ===
Semifinals
1 | (United States) Sandy Mayer | 6 | 6
8 | (West Germany) Peter Elter | 3 | 1
(West Germany) Ulrich Pinner | 4 | 6 | 4
(India) Ramesh Krishnan | 6 | 3 | 6

Final
1 | (United States) Sandy Mayer | 7 | 3 | 3 | 6
(India) Ramesh Krishnan | 5 | 6 | 6 | 7

=== Top half ===
First round
1 | (United States) S Mayer | 3 | 7 | 7
(West Germany) M Westphal | 6 | 5 | 5
Q | (United States) J Chatman | 3 | 6 | 6
(South Africa) D Schneider | 6 | 4 | 1
(Socialist Federal Republic of Yugoslavia) M Ostoja | 3 | 7 | 6
(West Germany) C Zipf | 6 | 5 | 0
(West Germany) HD Beutel | 2 | 6 | 4
6 | (West Germany) A Maurer | 6 | 3 | 6
3 | (Australia) M Edmondson | 3 | 6 | 4
(Zimbabwe) H Ismail | 6 | 2 | 6
(Brazil) M Hocevar | 7 | 7
Q | (France) C Bernelle | 6 | 5
Q | (India) S Menon | 2 | 6 | 6
(South Africa) M Myburg | 6 | 4 | 2
(Spain) J García Requena | 6 | r
8 | (West Germany) P Elter | 7

Second round
1 | (United States) S Mayer | 3 | 6 | 6
Q | (United States) J Chatman | 6 | 2 | 2
(Socialist Federal Republic of Yugoslavia) M Ostoja | 6 | 5 | 6
6 | (West Germany) A Maurer | 2 | 7 | 2
(Zimbabwe) H Ismail | 3 | 3
(Brazil) M Hocevar | 6 | 6
Q | (India) S Menon | 0 | 1
8 | (West Germany) P Elter | 6 | 6

Quarterfinals
1 | (United States) S Mayer | 4 | 6 | 6
(Socialist Federal Republic of Yugoslavia) M Ostoja | 6 | 0 | 1
(Brazil) M Hocevar | 3 | 2
8 | (West Germany) P Elter | 6 | 6

Semifinals
1 | (United States) S Mayer | 6 | 6
8 | (West Germany) P Elter | 3 | 1

=== Bottom half ===
First round
5 | (New Zealand) C Lewis | 6 | 6
(Spain) E Osta | 4 | 4
Q | (South Africa) B Mitton | 6 | 7 | 6
(Republic of Ireland) S Sorensen | 7 | 5 | 2
(West Germany) U Pinner | 6 | 6
(United States) F Taygan | 2 | 3
(Australia) R Frawley | 2 | 3
4 | (United Kingdom) B Mottram | 6 | 6
7 | (New Zealand) R Simpson | 4 | 0
(United States) B Lutz | 6 | 6
(Romania) F Segărceanu | 2 | 6 | 6
(West Germany) D Keretić | 6 | 3 | 4
(India) R Krishnan | 6 | 6
(South Africa) E Edwards | 2 | 2
(United States) J Borowiak | 2 | 6 | 6
2 | (United States) B Teacher | 6 | 4 | 1

Second round
5 | (New Zealand) C Lewis | 6 | 6
Q | (South Africa) B Mitton | 3 | 1
(West Germany) U Pinner | 6 | 6
4 | (United Kingdom) B Mottram | 1 | 3
(United States) B Lutz | 3 | 7 | 1
(Romania) F Segărceanu | 6 | 5 | 6
(India) R Krishnan | 3 | 6 | 6
(United States) J Borowiak | 6 | 4 | 1

Quarterfinals
5 | (New Zealand) C Lewis | 4 | 5
(West Germany) U Pinner | 6 | 7
(Romania) F Segărceanu | 2 | 5
(India) R Krishnan | 6 | 7

Semifinals
(West Germany) U Pinner | 4 | 6 | 4
(India) R Krishnan | 6 | 3 | 6
