= 1982 Monte Carlo Open – Doubles =

Doubles
- 1982 Monte Carlo Open

Final
- Champions: (Australia) Peter McNamara (Australia) Paul McNamee
- Runners-up: (Australia) Mark Edmondson (United States) Sherwood Stewart
- Score: 6–7, 7–6, 6–3

Details
- Draw: 16
- Seeds: 4

Events
Singles	Doubles
- Monte-Carlo Masters

Heinz Günthardt and Balázs Taróczy were the defending champions, but lost in the first round to Rod Frawley and Chris Lewis.

Peter McNamara and Paul McNamee won the title by defeating Mark Edmondson and Sherwood Stewart 6–7, 7–6, 6–3 in the final.

== Seeds ==
1. (Switzerland) Heinz Günthardt / (Hungary) Balázs Taróczy (first round)
2. (Australia) Peter McNamara / (Australia) Paul McNamee (champions)
3. (South Africa) Kevin Curren / (United States) Steve Denton (semifinals)
4. (Australia) Mark Edmondson / (United States) Sherwood Stewart (final)

== Draw ==
Key

- Q = Qualifier
- WC = Wild card
- LL = Lucky loser
- Alt = Alternate
- ITF = ITF entry
- PR = Protected ranking
- SR = Special ranking
- SE = Special exempt
- JE = Junior exempt
- JR = Junior Accelerator Programme entrant
- CO = College Accelerator Programme entrant
- NG = Next Gen Accelerator Program entrant
- w/o = Walkover
- r = Retired
- d = Defaulted

=== Draw ===
First round
1	(Switzerland) H Günthardt (Hungary) B Taróczy	6	1	2
(Australia) R Frawley (New Zealand) C Lewis	1	6	6
(Czechoslovakia) P Složil (Czechoslovakia) T Šmíd	6	6
(Italy) P Bertolucci (Italy) A Panatta	2	1
4	(Australia) M Edmondson (United States) S Stewart	7	6
(France) G Moretton (France) T Tulasne	6	2
(Argentina) JL Clerc (Romania) I Năstase	6	6
(Uruguay) JL Damiani (Uruguay) D Pérez	2	2
(Romania) I Țiriac (Argentina) G Vilas	7	7
(Australia) W Hampson (Australia) C Johnstone	6	6
(Israel) S Glickstein (United States) S Krulevitz	7	6	2
3	(South Africa) K Curren (United States) S Denton	6	7	6
(Sweden) P Hjertquist (West Germany) W Popp	4	6	6
(Spain) Á Giménez (Italy) G Ocleppo	6	3	2
(France) H Leconte (France) Y Noah	6	4
2	(Australia) P McNamara (Australia) P McNamee	7	6

Quarterfinals
(Australia) R Frawley (New Zealand) C Lewis	3	6	2
(Czechoslovakia) P Složil (Czechoslovakia) T Šmíd	6	2	6
4	(Australia) M Edmondson (United States) S Stewart	6	3	7
(Argentina) JL Clerc (Romania) I Năstase	3	6	6
(Romania) I Țiriac (Argentina) G Vilas	1	1
3	(South Africa) K Curren (United States) S Denton	6	6
(Sweden) P Hjertquist (West Germany) W Popp	2	2
2	(Australia) P McNamara (Australia) P McNamee	6	6

Semifinals
(Czechoslovakia) P Složil (Czechoslovakia) T Šmíd	6	3	4
4	(Australia) M Edmondson (United States) S Stewart	3	6	6
3	(South Africa) K Curren (United States) S Denton	0	3
2	(Australia) P McNamara (Australia) P McNamee	6	6

Final
4	(Australia) M Edmondson (United States) S Stewart	7	6	3
2	(Australia) P McNamara (Australia) P McNamee	6	7	6
