= 1982 Mercedes Cup – Doubles =

Doubles
- 1982 Mercedes Cup

Final
- Champions: (Australia) Mark Edmondson (United States) Brian Teacher
- Runners-up: (West Germany) Andreas Maurer (West Germany) Wolfgang Popp
- Score: 6–3, 6–1

Details
- Draw: 16
- Seeds: 4

Events
Singles	Doubles
- Stuttgart Open

Peter McNamara and Paul McNamee were the defending champions, but decided to rest after competing in the Davis Cup the previous week.

Mark Edmondson and Brian Teacherwon the title by defeating Andreas Maurer and Wolfgang Popp 6–3, 6–1 in the final.

== Seeds ==
1. (United States) Sherwood Stewart / (United States) Ferdi Taygan (semifinals)
2. (Australia) Mark Edmondson / (United States) Brian Teacher (champions)
3. (United States) Sandy Mayer / (South Africa) Frew McMillan (quarterfinals)
4. (United States) Mike Estep / (United States) Bob Lutz (quarterfinals)

== Draw ==
Key

- Q = Qualifier
- WC = Wild card
- LL = Lucky loser
- Alt = Alternate
- ITF = ITF entry
- PR = Protected ranking
- SR = Special ranking
- SE = Special exempt
- JE = Junior exempt
- JR = Junior Accelerator Programme entrant
- CO = College Accelerator Programme entrant
- NG = Next Gen Accelerator Program entrant
- w/o = Walkover
- r = Retired
- d = Defaulted

=== Draw ===
First round
1	(United States) S Stewart (United States) F Taygan	7	6
(Argentina) G Guerrero (Ecuador) R Viver	5	3
(United States) C Edwards (South Africa) E Edwards	7	6
(Australia) W Hampson (Socialist Federal Republic of Yugoslavia) M Ostoja	5	3
4	(United States) M Estep (United States) B Lutz	6	6
(Australia) N Callaghan (South Africa) B Mitton	2	4
(West Germany) A Maurer (West Germany) W Popp	6	6
(New Zealand) D Mustard (South Africa) D Schneider	2	2
(India) A Amritraj (New Zealand) R Simpson	4	6	7
(United States) J Chatman (Zimbabwe) H Ismail	6	2	6
(Australia) R Frawley (New Zealand) C Lewis	6	6
3	(United States) S Mayer (South Africa) F McMillan	7	7
(West Germany) HD Beutel (West Germany) C Zipf	6	6
(United States) J Borowiak (India) S Menon	4	2
(Brazil) M Hocevar (Romania) F Segărceanu	6	1	6
2	(Australia) M Edmondson (United States) B Teacher	4	6	7

Quarterfinals
1	(United States) S Stewart (United States) F Taygan	7	7
(United States) C Edwards (South Africa) E Edwards	6	5
4	(United States) M Estep (United States) B Lutz	4	6
(West Germany) A Maurer (West Germany) W Popp	6	7
(India) A Amritraj (New Zealand) R Simpson	6	6
3	(United States) S Mayer (South Africa) F McMillan	2	3
(West Germany) HD Beutel (West Germany) C Zipf	3	2
2	(Australia) M Edmondson (United States) B Teacher	6	6

Semifinals
1	(United States) S Stewart (United States) F Taygan	3	4
(West Germany) A Maurer (West Germany) W Popp	6	6
(India) A Amritraj (New Zealand) R Simpson	5	6
2	(Australia) M Edmondson (United States) B Teacher	7	7

Final
(West Germany) A Maurer (West Germany) W Popp	3	1
2	(Australia) M Edmondson (United States) B Teacher	6	6
