= 1982 Monte Carlo Open =

- Date: 5–11 April
- Edition: 76th
- Category: Grand Prix circuit
- Draw: 32S / 16D
- Prize money: $300,000
- Surface: Clay / outdoor
- Location: Roquebrune-Cap-Martin, France
- Venue: Monte Carlo Country Club

Champions

Singles
- (Argentina) Guillermo Vilas

Doubles
- (Australia) Peter McNamara / (Australia) Paul McNamee
- Monte Carlo Open

The 1982 Monte Carlo Open (also known as the Jacomo Monte Carlo Open for sponsorship reasons) was a men's tennis tournament played on outdoor clay courts at the Monte Carlo Country Club in Roquebrune-Cap-Martin, France that was part of the 1982 Volvo Grand Prix circuit. It was the 76th edition of the tournament and was held from 5 April through 11 April 1982. Second-seeded Guillermo Vilas won the singles title.

== Finals ==
=== Singles ===
(Argentina) Guillermo Vilas defeated (Czechoslovakia) Ivan Lendl, 6–1, 7–6, 6–3

- It was Vilas' 4th singles title of the year and the 56th of his career.

=== Doubles ===
(Australia) Peter McNamara / (Australia) Paul McNamee defeated (Australia) Mark Edmondson / (United States) Sherwood Stewart, 6–7, 7–6, 6–3
