= 1981 Australian Open – Men's singles =

Men's singles
- 1981 Australian Open

Final
- Champion: (South Africa) Johan Kriek
- Runner-up: (United States) Steve Denton
- Score: 6–2, 7–6^{(7–1)}, 6–7^{(1–7)}, 6–4

Details
- Draw: 64
- Seeds: 16

Events
Singles	men	women		boys	girls
Doubles	men	women	mixed	boys	girls
WC Singles	men	women	quad
WC Doubles	men	women	quad
Legends	men	women	mixed
- Australian Open

Johan Kriek defeated Steve Denton in the final, 6–2, 7–6^{(7–1)}, 6–7^{(1–7)}, 6–4 to win the men's singles tennis title at the 1981 Australian Open. It was his first major title, becoming the first South African to win a singles major. Kriek was making his tournament debut.

Brian Teacher was the reigning champion, but did not compete this year.

== Seeds ==
The seeded players are listed below. Johan Kriek is the champion; others show the round in which they were eliminated.

1. (Argentina) Guillermo Vilas (third round)
2. (Australia) Peter McNamara (quarterfinals)
3. (United States) Roscoe Tanner (second round)
4. (South Africa) Johan Kriek (champion)
5. (Australia) Kim Warwick (quarterfinals)
6. (Australia) Mark Edmondson (semifinals)
7. (United States) Fritz Buehning (first round)
8. (United States) Tim Mayotte (quarterfinals)
9. (Israel) Shlomo Glickstein (quarterfinals)
10. (United States) John Sadri (first round)
11. (New Zealand) Chris Lewis (third round)
12. (United States) Hank Pfister (semifinals)
13. (United States) Pat DuPré (third round)
14. (South Africa) Kevin Curren (second round)
15. (United States) Peter Rennert (second round)
16. (Australia) John Fitzgerald (first round)

== Draw ==
=== Key ===
- Q = Qualifier
- WC = Wild card
- LL = Lucky loser
- r = Retired

=== Final eight ===
Quarterfinals
12	(United States) Hank Pfister	6	4	6	6
5	(Australia) Kim Warwick	1	6	4	3
9	(Israel) Shlomo Glickstein	4	6	6	0
(United States) Steve Denton	6	3	7	6
8	(United States) Tim Mayotte	6	3	5
4	(South Africa) Johan Kriek	7	6	7
6	(Australia) Mark Edmondson	7	7	6
2	(Australia) Peter McNamara	5	6	3

Semifinals
12	(United States) Hank Pfister	6	7	1	6	3
(United States) Steve Denton	7	6	6	3	6
4	(South Africa) Johan Kriek	6	7	7
6	(Australia) Mark Edmondson	0	6	5

Final
(United States) Steve Denton	2	6	7	4
4	(South Africa) Johan Kriek	6	7	6	6

=== Section 1 ===
First round
1	(Argentina) G Vilas	6	6	7
(Sweden) J Nyström	4	2	6
Q	(Australia) W Masur	6	4	6	2	6
(United States) L Stefanki	4	6	2	6	7
(Sweden) H Simonsson	6	7	6	6
(United States) R Hightower	4	6	7	3
(United States) L Bourne	6	6	3	6	1
12	(United States) H Pfister	3	7	6	2	6
16	(Australia) J Fitzgerald	7	6	6	3	4
(Australia) P Dent	5	3	7	6	6
(Australia) C Fancutt	3	6	6	6
(Australia) C Johnstone	6	4	3	0
(United States) J Gurfein	6	7	6
Q	(Australia) W Pascoe	3	6	3
(Australia) B Drewett	4	1	2
5	(Australia) K Warwick	6	6	6

Second round
1	(Argentina) G Vilas	6	6	6	6
(United States) L Stefanki	7	3	4	4
(Sweden) H Simonsson	2	0	2
12	(United States) H Pfister	6	6	6
(Australia) P Dent	7	6	7
(Australia) C Fancutt	6	4	6
(United States) J Gurfein	5	2	5
5	(Australia) K Warwick	7	6	7

Third round
1	(Argentina) G Vilas	3	4	4
12	(United States) H Pfister	6	6	6
(Australia) P Dent	3	3	0
5	(Australia) K Warwick	6	6	6

Quarterfinals
12	(United States) H Pfister	6	4	6	6
5	(Australia) K Warwick	1	6	4	3

=== Section 2 ===
First round
3	(United States) R Tanner	6	6	6
(Australia) G Whitecross	3	3	3
(Australia) R Frawley	2	6	6	3	6
(United Kingdom) A Jarrett	6	2	1	6	3
(United States) D Siegler	6	6	3	3	3
(France) J Potier	3	1	6	6	6
(United States) C Dunk	4	6	5
9	(Israel) S Glickstein	6	7	7
14	(South Africa) K Curren	6	6	6
(United States) S Krulevitz	2	2	1
(South Africa) E Edwards	6	7	3	6	3
(United States) S Denton	7	6	6	4	6
(France) T Tulasne	6	6	7
(New Zealand) O Parun	3	4	5
(Australia) J Alexander	2	6	3	6	7
7	(United States) F Buehning	6	4	6	1	6

Second round
3	(United States) R Tanner	3	6	4	3
(Australia) R Frawley	6	4	6	6
(France) J Potier	3	4	2
9	(Israel) S Glickstein	6	6	6
14	(South Africa) K Curren	7	6	3	2	2
(United States) S Denton	6	3	6	6	6
(France) T Tulasne	4	1	3
(Australia) J Alexander	6	6	6

Third round
(Australia) R Frawley	2	3	2
9	(Israel) S Glickstein	6	6	6
(United States) S Denton	6	4	7	7	7
(Australia) J Alexander	7	6	6	5	6

Quarterfinals
9	(Israel) S Glickstein	4	6	6	0
(United States) S Denton	6	3	7	6

=== Section 3 ===
First round
8	(United States) T Mayotte	6	6	6
Q	(United States) E Sherbeck	2	3	1
(United States) R Van't Hof	6	6	1	4	6
(United States) T Wilkison	3	3	6	6	3
(New Zealand) R Simpson	6	7	6	6	6
Q	(Australia) D Collings	7	5	7	4	4
(Australia) B Guan	4	7	6	3	3
13	(United States) P DuPré	6	6	4	6	6
11	(New Zealand) C Lewis	6	6	6
(Romania) I Năstase	4	3	2
(United Kingdom) J Smith	2	6	7	4	1
(United States) M Davis	6	7	6	6	6
Q	(Sweden) T Högstedt	7	6	6
(United States) S McCain	5	4	2
Q	(United States) D Gitlin	2	5	1
4	(South Africa) J Kriek	6	7	6

Second round
8	(United States) T Mayotte	7	6	6
(United States) R Van't Hof	6	3	3
(New Zealand) R Simpson	4	4	2
13	(United States) P DuPré	6	6	6
11	(New Zealand) C Lewis	6	6	6
(United States) M Davis	4	3	3
Q	(Sweden) T Högstedt	2	4	6
4	(South Africa) J Kriek	6	6	7

Third round
8	(United States) T Mayotte	7	7	6
13	(United States) P DuPré	6	5	4
11	(New Zealand) C Lewis	5	5	6	6	4
4	(South Africa) J Kriek	7	7	3	2	6

Quarterfinals
8	(United States) T Mayotte	6	3	5
4	(South Africa) J Kriek	7	6	7

=== Section 4 ===
First round
6	(Australia) M Edmondson	6	6	6
(Australia) P Cash	1	2	3
(Australia) S Ball	6	6	4	7
Q	(United States) S Meister	2	4	6	6
(United States) J Delaney	6	3	6	7
Q	(United States) M Mitchell	4	6	3	6
Q	(Australia) C Letcher	3	6	6	6
10	(United States) J Sadri	6	3	4	4
15	(United States) P Rennert	6	6	3	6
(Australia) CA Miller	2	2	6	3
(Australia) P Kronk	3	6	6	7
(Sweden) M Wilander	6	3	4	5
(United Kingdom) R Lewis	7	6	6
(United States) C Wittus	6	4	0
(Australia) D Carter	0	2	2
2	(Australia) P McNamara	6	6	6

Second round
6	(Australia) M Edmondson	5	1	7	7	6
(Australia) S Ball	7	6	5	5	4
(United States) J Delaney	6	6	6	6	4
Q	(Australia) C Letcher	7	7	4	3	6
15	(United States) P Rennert	6	1	3
(Australia) P Kronk	7	6	6
(United Kingdom) R Lewis	6	6	5	4	2
2	(Australia) P McNamara	3	4	7	6	6

Third round
6	(Australia) M Edmondson	6	6	6
Q	(Australia) C Letcher	2	0	3
(Australia) P Kronk	6	2	2	6	3
2	(Australia) P McNamara	1	6	6	4	6

Quarterfinals
6	(Australia) M Edmondson	7	7	6
2	(Australia) P McNamara	5	6	3

Preceded by 1981 US Open	Grand Slam men's singles	Succeeded by 1982 French Open
