= 1982 Monte Carlo Open – Singles =

Singles
- 1982 Monte Carlo Open

Final
- Champion: (Argentina) Guillermo Vilas
- Runner-up: (Czechoslovakia) Ivan Lendl
- Score: 6–1, 7–6, 6–3

Details
- Draw: 32 (4Q)
- Seeds: 8

Events
Singles	Doubles
- Monte-Carlo Masters

No defending champions were declared for this edition, as the 1981 Final match between Jimmy Connors and Guillermo Vilas was cancelled due to rain, with the score tied 5–5 in the first set.

Connors did not compete this year, while Vilas successfully managed to win the title, by defeating Ivan Lendl 6–1, 7–6, 6–3 in the final.

This was the only tournament that Björn Borg disputed in the entire season, and the last one before retiring from professional tennis in January 1983. Borg will eventually reach the quarterfinals, before losing to Yannick Noah in straight sets.

== Seeds ==
1. (Czechoslovakia) Ivan Lendl (final)
2. (Argentina) Guillermo Vilas (champion)
3. (Argentina) José Luis Clerc (semifinals)
4. (Sweden) Björn Borg (quarterfinals)
5. (Australia) Peter McNamara (first round)
6. (France) Yannick Noah (semifinals)
7. (Hungary) Balázs Taróczy (quarterfinals)
8. (Czechoslovakia) Tomáš Šmíd (second round)

== Draw ==
Key

- Q = Qualifier
- WC = Wild card
- LL = Lucky loser
- Alt = Alternate
- ITF = ITF entry
- PR = Protected ranking
- SR = Special ranking
- SE = Special exempt
- JE = Junior exempt
- JR = Junior Accelerator Programme entrant
- CO = College Accelerator Programme entrant
- NG = Next Gen Accelerator Program entrant
- w/o = Walkover
- r = Retired
- d = Defaulted

=== Finals ===
Semifinals
1	(Czechoslovakia) Ivan Lendl	6	1	6
6	(France) Yannick Noah	1	6	1
3	(Argentina) José Luis Clerc	6	5
2	(Argentina) Guillermo Vilas	7	7

Final
1	(Czechoslovakia) Ivan Lendl	1	6	3
2	(Argentina) Guillermo Vilas	6	7	6

=== Top half ===
First round
1	(Czechoslovakia) I Lendl	7	6
(Chile) P Rebolledo	6	2
(Switzerland) H Günthardt	4	6	6
(Ecuador) A Gómez	6	2	4
(India) R Krishnan	1	4
Q	(France) T Tulasne	6	6
(Romania) I Năstase	6	4	4
7	(Hungary) B Taróczy	1	6	6
4/Q	(Sweden) B Borg	6	6
(Spain) F Luna	4	3
(Australia) P McNamee	6	2	5
(Italy) A Panatta	1	6	7
Q	(Italy) C Panatta	7	6
(Uruguay) JL Damiani	6	4
(Australia) R Frawley	1	2
6	(France) Y Noah	6	6

Second round
1	(Czechoslovakia) I Lendl	6	6
(Switzerland) H Günthardt	4	1
Q	(France) T Tulasne	3	4
7	(Hungary) B Taróczy	6	6
4/Q	(Sweden) B Borg	6	3	6
(Italy) A Panatta	2	6	4
Q	(Italy) C Panatta	6	1	5
6	(France) Y Noah	3	6	7

Quarterfinals
1	(Czechoslovakia) I Lendl	6	6
7	(Hungary) B Taróczy	0	1
4/Q	(Sweden) B Borg	1	2
6	(France) Y Noah	6	6

Semifinals
1	(Czechoslovakia) I Lendl	6	1	6
6	(France) Y Noah	1	6	1

=== Bottom half ===
First round
8	(Czechoslovakia) T Šmíd	6	6
(Bolivia) M Martínez	1	3
(Italy) C Barazzutti	1	6	4
(Spain) M Orantes	6	3	4
(Spain) J Higueras	6	6
(West Germany) R Gehring	3	3
(Italy) G Ocleppo	2	5
3	(Argentina) JL Clerc	6	7
5	(Australia) P McNamara	3	2
(West Germany) P Elter	6	6
(Peru) P Arraya	3	7	6
Q	(United States) J Arias	6	6	3
(West Germany) A Maurer	3	3
(Israel) S Glickstein	6	6
(New Zealand) C Lewis	1	1
2	(Argentina) G Vilas	6	6

Second round
8	(Czechoslovakia) T Šmíd	4	3
(Spain) M Orantes	6	6
(Spain) J Higueras	6	5
3	(Argentina) JL Clerc	7	7
(West Germany) P Elter	4	5
(Peru) P Arraya	6	7
(Israel) S Glickstein	4	3
2	(Argentina) G Vilas	6	6

Quarterfinals
(Spain) M Orantes	0	3
3	(Argentina) JL Clerc	6	6
(Peru) P Arraya	1	1
2	(Argentina) G Vilas	6	6

Semifinals
3	(Argentina) JL Clerc	6	5
2	(Argentina) G Vilas	7	7
