= 1979 New Zealand Open – Singles =

Singles
- 1979 New Zealand Open

Final
- Champion: (United States) Tim Wilkison
- Runner-up: (Austria) Peter Feigl
- Score: 6–3, 4–6, 6–4, 2–6, 6–2

Details
- Draw: 32
- Seeds: 8

Events
Singles	Doubles
- ATP Auckland Open

Eighth-seeded Tim Wilkison defeated first-seeded Peter Feigl 6–3, 4–6, 6–4, 2–6, 6–2 to win the singles title at the 1979 New Zealand Open tennis tournament. Eliot Teltscher was the champion but did not defend his title.

== Seeds ==
A champion seed is indicated in bold text while text in italics indicates the round in which that seed was eliminated.

1. (Austria) Peter Feigl (final)
2. (Australia) Kim Warwick (quarterfinals)
3. (South Africa) Bernard Mitton (second round)
4. (United States) John Sadri (second round)
5. (Australia) Steve Docherty (second round)
6. (New Zealand) Russell Simpson (first round)
7. (New Zealand) Brian Fairlie (first round)
8. (United States) Tim Wilkison **(champion)**

== Draw ==
=== Key ===
- Q - Qualifier

NB: The Final was the best of 5 sets while all other rounds were the best of 3 sets.

=== Final ===
Final
1	(Austria) Peter Feigl	3	**6**	4	**6**	2
8	(United States) **Tim Wilkison**	**6**	4	**6**	2	**6**

=== Section 1 ===
First round
1	(Austria) **P Feigl**	**7**	5	**6**
(Canada) H Fritz	6	**7**	3
(India) **S Menon**	4	**7**	**6**
(United States) G Taylor	**6**	6	4
(New Zealand) **D Mustard**	**6**	**7**
(United States) B Kleege	2	2
(Australia) **R Frawley**	**6**	**6**
7	(New Zealand) B Fairlie	2	2
3	(South Africa) **B Mitton**	**6**	1	**6**
(South Africa) R Moore	3	**6**	1
(New Zealand) O Parun	5	2
(India) **R Krishnan**	**7**	**6**
(United Kingdom) **A Jarrett**	**6**	4	**6**
Q	(United States) A Kohlberg	3	**6**	4
(New Zealand) J Bartlett	4	6
5	(Australia) **S Docherty**	**6**	**7**

Second round
1	(Austria) **P Feigl**	**7**	**6**
(India) S Menon	6	3
(New Zealand) D Mustard	**7**	2	6
(Australia) **R Frawley**	5	**6**	**8**
3	(South Africa) B Mitton	**6**	3	6
(India) **R Krishnan**	2	**6**	**8**
(United Kingdom) **A Jarrett**	**6**	4	**6**
5	(Australia) S Docherty	3	**6**	3

Quarterfinals
1	(Austria) **P Feigl**	**7**	3	**6**
(Australia) R Frawley	5	**6**	1
(India) R Krishnan	**6**	6	3
(United Kingdom) **A Jarrett**	1	**7**	**6**

Semifinals
1	(Austria) **P Feigl**	**6**	**7**
(United Kingdom) A Jarrett	2	6

=== Section 2 ===
First round
6	(New Zealand) R Simpson	4	4
(United Kingdom) **R Lewis**	**6**	**6**
(United Kingdom) J Smith	**7**	6	2
Q	(United States) **L Loeb**	5	**7**	**6**
(New Zealand) S Harley	3	3
(Australia) **C Fancutt**	**6**	**6**
(Finland) L Palin	2	5
4	(United States) **J Sadri**	**6**	**7**
8	(United States) **T Wilkison**	**6**	**6**
Q	(New Zealand) P Hampton	3	3
(Egypt) I El Shafei	4	6
(United States) **J DiLouie**	**6**	**7**
Q	(Australia) S Clarke	6	1
(Australia) **D Collings**	**7**	**6**
(New Zealand) B Hibbert	4	**6**	3
2	(Australia) **K Warwick**	**6**	4	**6**

Second round
(United Kingdom) **R Lewis**	**6**	3	**6**
Q	(United States) L Loeb	4	**6**	3
(Australia) **C Fancutt**	2	**7**	**6**
4	(United States) J Sadri	**6**	6	4
8	(United States) **T Wilkison**	**7**	**7**
(United States) J Delouie	5	6
(Australia) D Collings	4	**6**	0
2	(Australia) **K Warwick**	**6**	4	**6**

Quarterfinals
(United Kingdom) **R Lewis**	**7**	**6**
(Australia) C Fancutt	6	3
8	(United States) **T Wilkison**	**6**	**6**
2	(Australia) K Warwick	2	3

Semifinals
(United Kingdom) R Lewis	2	1
8	(United States) **T Wilkison**	**6**	**6**
