= 1982 United Bank Classic =

- Date: February 1–7
- Edition: 11th
- Category: Grand Prix
- Draw: 32S / 16D
- Prize money: $250,000
- Surface: Carpet / indoor
- Location: Denver, Colorado, U.S.

Champions

Singles
- (United States) John Sadri

Doubles
- (South Africa) Kevin Curren / (United States) Steve Denton
- Denver Open

The 1982 United Bank Classic, also known as the Denver WCT, was a men's tennis tournament played on indoor carpet courts in Denver, Colorado in the United States that was part of the 1982 Grand Prix circuit. It was the 11th and last edition of the tournament and took place from February 1 through February 7, 1982. Unseeded John Sadri won the singles competition.

== Finals ==
=== Singles ===
(United States) John Sadri defeated (Ecuador) Andrés Gómez 4–6, 6–1, 6–4

- It was Sadri's 1st singles title of the year and the 2nd and final of his career.

=== Doubles ===
(South Africa) Kevin Curren / (United States) Steve Denton defeated (Australia) Phil Dent / (Australia) Kim Warwick 6–4, 6–4
