= 1980 Benson and Hedges Open =

- Date: 1–7 January
- Edition: 13th
- Category: Grand Prix
- Draw: 32S / 16D
- Prize money: $50,000
- Surface: Hard / outdoor
- Location: Auckland, New Zealand

Champions

Singles
- (United States) John Sadri

Doubles
- (Austria) Peter Feigl / (Australia) Rod Frawley
- ATP Auckland Open

The 1980 Benson and Hedges Open was a men's professional tennis tournament. The event was part of the 1980 Grand Prix circuit and was held in Auckland, New Zealand. It was the 13th edition of the tournament and was played on outdoor hardcourts and was held from 1 January through 7 January 1980. First-seeded John Sadri won the singles title.

== Finals ==
=== Singles ===
(United States) John Sadri defeated (United States) Tim Wilkison 6–4, 3–6, 6–3, 6–4

- It was Sadri's 1st title of the year and the 1st of his career.

=== Doubles ===
(Austria) Peter Feigl / (Australia) Rod Frawley defeated (United States) John Sadri / (United States) Tim Wilkison 6–2, 7–5

- It was Feigl's 1st title of the year and the 4th of his career. It was Frawley's 1st title of the year and the 2nd of his career.
