= 1982 Mercedes Cup =

- Date: 12–18 July
- Edition: 5th
- Category: Grand Prix
- Draw: 32S / 16D
- Prize money: $75,000
- Surface: Clay / outdoor
- Location: Stuttgart, West Germany
- Venue: Tennis Club Weissenhof

Champions

Singles
- (India) Ramesh Krishnan

Doubles
- (Australia) Mark Edmondson / (United States) Brian Teacher
- Stuttgart Open

The 1982 Mercedes Cup, was a men's tennis tournament played on outdoor clay courts and held at the Tennis Club Weissenhof in Stuttgart, West Germany that was part of the 1982 Grand Prix circuit. It was the fifth edition of the tournament and was held from 12 July until 18 July 1982. Unseeded Ramesh Krishnan won the singles title.

== Finals ==
=== Singles ===
(India) Ramesh Krishnan defeated (United States) Sandy Mayer, 5–7, 6–3, 6–3, 7–6

- It was Krishnan's 1st singles title of the year and the 2nd of his career.

=== Doubles ===
(Australia) Mark Edmondson / (United States) Brian Teacher defeated (West Germany) Andreas Maurer / (West Germany) Wolfgang Popp, 6–3, 6–1
