= 1981 Nivea Tennis Classic =

- Date: 5–11 October
- Edition: 8th
- Category: Grand Prix
- Draw: 32S / 16D
- Prize money: $50,000
- Surface: Grass / outdoor
- Location: Brisbane, Queensland, Australia
- Venue: Milton Courts

Champions

Singles
- (Australia) Mark Edmondson

Doubles
- (Australia) Rod Frawley / (New Zealand) Chris Lewis
- South Pacific Tennis Classic

The 1981 Nivea Tennis Classic, also known as the South Pacific Classic, was an Association of Tennis Professionals men's tournament held on outdoor grass courts at the Milton Courts in Brisbane, Queensland, Australia that was part of the 1981 Grand Prix tennis circuit. It was the eighth and last edition of the tournament and was held from 5 October until 11 October 1981. Second-seeded Mark Edmondson won the singles title, his third at the event after 1976 and 1978.

== Finals ==
=== Singles ===
(Australia) Mark Edmondson defeated (New Zealand) Chris Lewis 7–6, 3–6, 6–4

- It was Edmondson's 3rd singles title of the year and the 6th and final of his career.

=== Doubles ===
(Australia) Rod Frawley / (New Zealand) Chris Lewis defeated (Australia) Mark Edmondson / (United States) Mike Estep 7–5, 4–6, 7–6^{(7–4)}
