= 1979 New Zealand Open =

- Date: 2–8 January
- Edition: 12th
- Category: Grand Prix
- Draw: 32S / 16D
- Prize money: $50,000
- Surface: Hard / outdoor
- Location: Auckland, New Zealand

Champions

Singles
- (United States) Tim Wilkison

Doubles
- (South Africa) Bernard Mitton / (Australia) Kim Warwick
- New Zealand Open

The 1979 New Zealand Open was a men's professional tennis tournament. The event was part of the 1979 Grand Prix circuit and was held in Auckland, New Zealand. It was the 12th edition of the tournament and was played on outdoor hardcourts and was held from 2 January through 8 January 1979. Eighth-seeded Tim Wilkison won the singles title.

== Finals ==
=== Singles ===
(United States) Tim Wilkison defeated (Austria) Peter Feigl 6–3, 4–6, 6–4, 2–6, 6–2

- It was Wilkinson's only title of the year and the 2nd of his career.

=== Doubles ===
(South Africa) Bernard Mitton / (Australia) Kim Warwick defeated (United Kingdom) Andrew Jarrett / (United Kingdom) Jonathan Smith 6–3, 2–6, 6–3

- It was Mitton's 1st title of the year and the 2nd of his career. It was Warwick's 1st title of the year and the 9th of his career.
