= 1981 Australian Open =

- Date: 21 December 1981 – 3 January 1982
- Edition: 70th
- Category: Grand Slam (ITF)
- Surface: Grass
- Location: Melbourne, Australia
- Venue: Kooyong Lawn Tennis Club

Champions

Men's singles
- (South Africa) Johan Kriek

Women's singles
- (United States) Martina Navratilova

Men's doubles
- (Australia) Mark Edmondson / (Australia) Kim Warwick

Women's doubles
- (United States) Kathy Jordan / (United States) Anne Smith

Boys' singles
- (Sweden) Jörgen Windahl

Girls' singles
- (Australia) Anne Minter
- Australian Open

The 1981 Australian Open was a tennis tournament played on grass courts at the Kooyong Lawn Tennis Club in Melbourne in Victoria in Australia. It was the 70th edition of the Australian Open and was held from 30 November through 6 December 1981 for the women and from 24 December 1981 through 3 January 1982 for the men.

== Seniors ==
=== Men's singles ===
(South Africa) Johan Kriek defeated (United States) Steve Denton, 6–2, 7–6^{(7–1)}, 6–7^{(1–7)}, 6–4

• It was Kriek's 1st career Grand Slam singles title.

=== Women's singles ===
(United States) Martina Navratilova defeated (United States) Chris Evert, 6–7^{(4–7)}, 6–4, 7–5

• It was Navratilova's 3rd career Grand Slam singles title and her 1st title at the Australian Open.

=== Men's doubles ===
(Australia) Mark Edmondson / (Australia) Kim Warwick defeated (United States) Hank Pfister / (United States) John Sadri 6–3, 6–7, 6–3

• It was Edmondson's 2nd career Grand Slam doubles title and his 2nd title at the Australian Open.
• It was Warwick's 3rd career Grand Slam doubles title and his 3rd and last title at the Australian Open.

=== Women's doubles ===
(United States) Kathy Jordan / (United States) Anne Smith defeated (United States) Martina Navratilova / (United States) Pam Shriver 6–2, 7–5

• It was Jordan's 4th career Grand Slam doubles title and her 1st and only title at the Australian Open.
• It was Smith's 4th career Grand Slam doubles title and her 1st and only title at the Australian Open.

=== Mixed doubles ===
The competition was not held between 1970 and 1986.

== Juniors ==
=== Boys' singles ===
(Sweden) Jörgen Windahl defeated (Australia) Pat Cash 6–4, 6–4

=== Girls' singles ===
(Australia) Anne Minter defeated (France) Corinne Vanier 6–4, 6–2

=== Boys' doubles ===
(New Zealand) David Lewis and (Australia) Tony Withers won the title

=== Girls' doubles ===
(Australia) Maree Booth and (Australia) Sharon Hodgkin won the title

Preceded by 1981 US Open	Grand Slams	Succeeded by 1982 French Open
