= Geneva Lewis =

New Zealand-born violinist

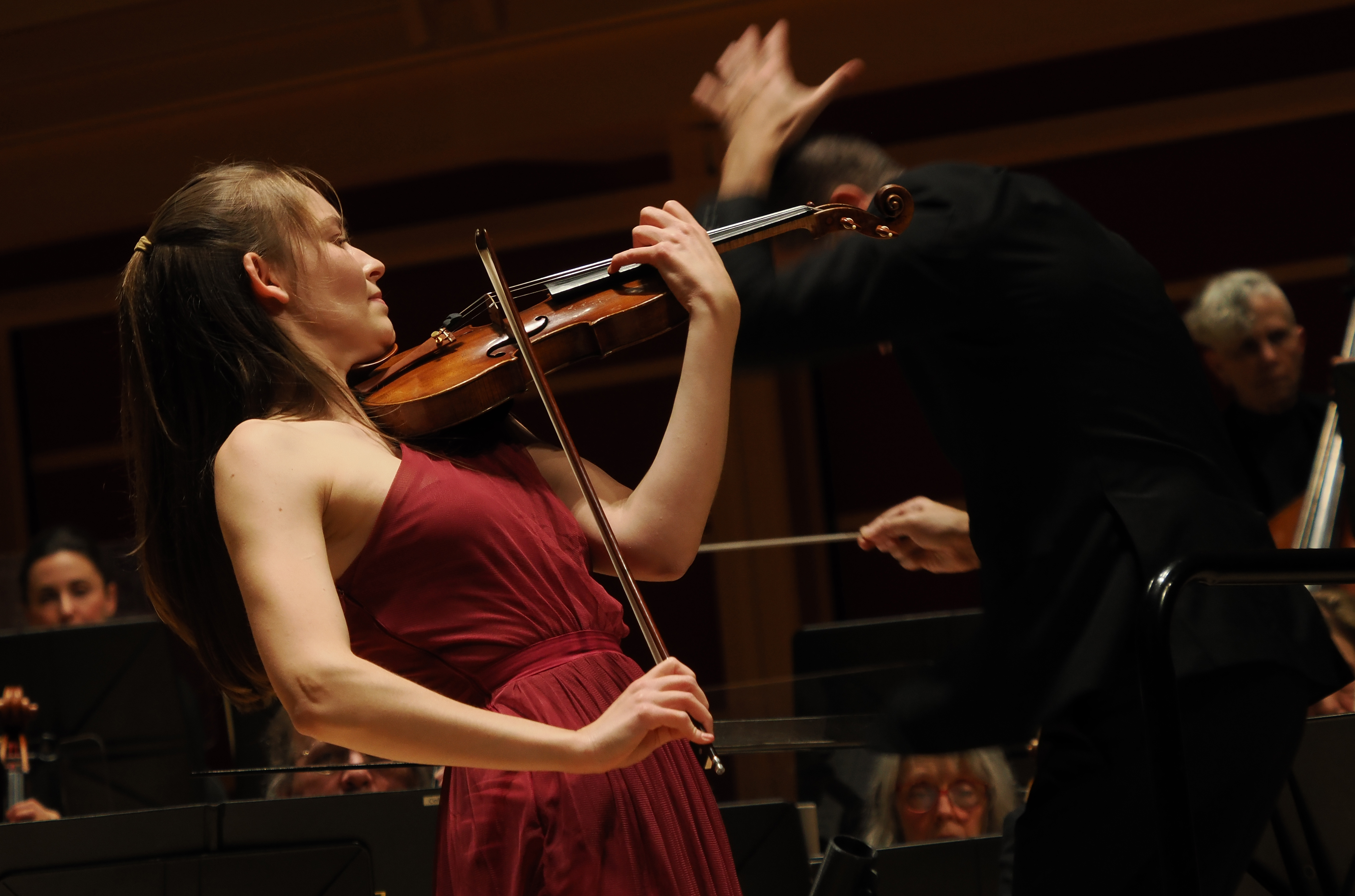

Geneva Lewis (born 1998) is a New Zealand-born violinist now living in the United States.

Lewis was born in Auckland, New Zealand. Her father is Chris Lewis, a former professional tennis player. She began playing the violin at the age of three. Living in Irvine, she studied with Aimée Kreston from the age of seven at the Colburn School of Performing Arts in Los Angeles. Later, she studied with Miriam Fried at the New England Conservatory of Music.

In 2020, Lewis won the Grand Prize at the Concert Artists Guild Competition. She received an Avery Fisher Career Grant in 2021 and the Borletti-Buitoni Trust Award in 2022. She also won the gold medal at the 2015 Fischoff National Chamber Music Competition as a member of the Incendium Quartet. In May 2022, she joined the BBC Radio 3 New Generation Artists scheme.
