= Mark Lewis (tennis) =

New Zealand tennis player and coach

- Country (sports): New Zealand
- Born: 27 May 1961 (age 64)

Singles
- Career record: 3–6
- Highest ranking: No. 403 (4 January 1981)

Doubles
- Career record: 11–18
- Highest ranking: No. 92 (27 August 1984)

Grand Slam doubles results
- Australian Open: 2R (1983)
- French Open: 2R (1984)
- US Open: 1R (1984)

Personal details
- Relatives: Chris Lewis (brother); David Lewis (brother); Geneva Lewis (niece)

Mark Lewis (born 27 May 1961) is a champion New Zealand tennis player and a Professional Tennis coach. He is the younger brother of Chris Lewis and older brother of David Lewis. He spent his childhood in Auckland and was educated at St Peter's College.

== Playing career ==
Lewis was New Zealand Men's Tennis Singles Champion 1979-80 and New Zealand Men's Tennis Doubles Champion (with B Derlin) 1980–1981 and (with P. Smith) 1983–1984. He was a member of the New Zealand Davis Cup team in 1980 and 1981. On the world tour ATP he reached a career high of 403 in singles on 22 December 1980 and a doubles high of 92 on 27 September 1984. In singles his win–loss record was 3-6 and for doubles 11–18. He won a total of $709 during his playing career. Lewis played in 3 Grand Slams: Roland Garros, US Open and Australian Open.

== Coaching career ==
After Lewis had stopped playing he became a coach. Lewis coached Michael Stich through his win at Wimbledon over Boris Becker in 1991. After Lewis stopped coaching Stich he returned home to New Zealand and started up a junior development programme with his brother Chris. This programme developed many top juniors in Auckland, the most notable being Marina Erakovic.

== Current Occupation ==
Lewis now lives in Auckland, New Zealand with his wife Ann-Maree, his son Tyler, and his daughter Amber. Although he does not coach anymore he is still involved with tennis and is the Club/Schools manager at Tennis Auckland.
