= Steve Denton =

American tennis player and coach

- Country (sports): United States
- Residence: College Station, Texas, U.S.
- Born: September 5, 1956 (age 70) Kingsville, Texas, U.S.
- Height: 1.88 m (6 ft 2 in)
- Turned pro: 1978
- Retired: 1987
- Plays: Right-handed (one-handed backhand)
- College: University of Texas
- Prize money: $1,084,664

Singles
- Career record: 108–116 (48.2%)
- Career titles: 0
- Highest ranking: No. 12 (April 18, 1983)

Grand Slam singles results
- Australian Open: F (1981, 1982)
- French Open: 1R (1982, 1984)
- Wimbledon: 4R (1982)
- US Open: 4R (1982)

Other tournaments
- Tour Finals: 1R (1982)
- WCT Finals: QF (1983)

Doubles
- Career record: 325–198 (62.1%)
- Career titles: 18
- Highest ranking: No. 2 (August 15, 1983)

Grand Slam doubles results
- Australian Open: F (1983)
- French Open: QF (1984)
- Wimbledon: SF (1982, 1983)
- US Open: W (1982)

Other doubles tournaments
- Tour Finals: F (1982)

Steve Denton (born September 5, 1956) is a former professional tennis player. He is currently the head men's tennis coach at Texas A&M University.

After becoming an all-American at the University of Texas in 1978, Denton spent nine seasons playing for the ATP Tour. He reached the final of the 1981 Australian Open, losing in four sets to Johan Kriek and lost to the same opponent in the 1982 Australian Open final, this time in straight sets. He won the 1982 US Open doubles championship with Kevin Curren, attaining career-high rankings of World No. 12 in singles and World No. 2 in doubles. He won a total of 18 tour level doubles titles and, despite reaching 6 finals, never won a singles title. In 1984, he served a 138 miles per hour (222 km/h) serve. After retiring from the pros, he moved to Corpus Christi, Texas, coaching several local junior tennis teams. In 2001, he debuted his college coaching career at Texas A&M University–Corpus Christi, where he led his teams to three conference championships and a first-ever NCAA tournament appearance. In 2006, he resigned to become the head coach at Texas A&M University.

For his accomplishments, he is a member of the ITA Hall of Fame, the Texas Tennis Hall of Fame, the Blue-Gray Tennis Class Hall of Fame, and the Longhorn Hall of Honor.

== Playing career ==
=== High school and college ===
Denton attended Bishop High School in Bishop, Texas. As a prep, he won four consecutive UIL state 3A singles titles. He then attended the University of Texas at Austin, where he played tennis from 1976 to 1979. He earned all-American honors in 1978. Along with teammate Kevin Curren, he won the U.S. Tennis Association amateur indoor and SWC doubles title in 1979. He completed his college career with an 85–22 singles record, which currently ranks third all-time in school history. He also compiled a 72–18 doubles record, and a 78–27 team record. For his collegiate and professional accomplishments, he was inducted into the Longhorn Hall of Honor in 2006.

=== Professional ===
Denton was ranked as high as world No. 12 on the ATP rankings in singles and No. 2 in doubles, both in 1983. Denton was known for his big serve and employed an unusual service motion which involved taking two steps forward prior to striking the ball. Current ATP rules prohibit such a motion (or any service motion involving a running or walking start). In 1984, Denton served a 138 mph (222 km/h) serve.

He reached six singles finals, most notably the Australian Open (in 1981 and 1982) and the Cincinnati Masters (in 1982). He also won 18 doubles titles (including the US Open and the Canada Masters) in 1982, and reaching 23 additional doubles finals.

== Grand Slam finals ==
=== Singles (2 runners-up) ===
Result	Year	Championship	Surface	Opponent	Score
Loss	1981	Australian Open	Grass	(South Africa) Johan Kriek	6–2, 7–6, 6–7, 6–4
Loss	1982	Australian Open (2)	Grass	(United States) Johan Kriek	6–3, 6–3, 6–2

=== Doubles (1 championship, 1 runner-up) ===
Result	Year	Championship	Surface	Partner	Opponents	Score
Win	1982	US Open	Grass	(South Africa) Kevin Curren	(United States) Victor Amaya (United States) Hank Pfister	6–2, 6–7, 5–7, 6–2, 6–4
Loss	1983	Australian Open	Grass	(United States) Sherwood Stewart	(Australia) Mark Edmondson (Australia) Paul McNamee	6–3, 7–6

=== Mixed doubles (3 runners-up) ===
Result	Year	Championship	Surface	Partner	Opponents	Score
Loss	1983	Wimbledon	Grass	(United States) Billie Jean King	(United Kingdom) John Lloyd (Australia) Wendy Turnbull	6–7, 7–6, 7–5
Loss	1983	US Open	Grass	(United States) JoAnne Russell	(United States) Anne Smith (South Africa) Kevin Curren	6–4, 7–6
Loss	1984	Wimbledon (2)	Grass	(United States) Kathy Jordan	(United Kingdom) John Lloyd (Australia) Wendy Turnbull	6–3, 6–3

== Grand Slam tournament performance timeline ==
Key
W	F	SF	QF	#R	RR	Q#	DNQ	A	NH

(W) winner; (F) finalist; (SF) semifinalist; (QF) quarterfinalist; (#R) rounds 4, 3, 2, 1; (RR) round-robin stage; (Q#) qualification round; (DNQ) did not qualify; (A) absent; (NH) not held; (SR) strike rate (events won / competed); (W–L) win–loss record.

=== Singles ===
Tournament	1980	1981	1982	1983	1984	1985	1986	1987	1988	SR
Australian Open	Q3	F	F	3R	1R	2R	NH	1R	A	0 / 6
French Open	A	A	1R	A	1R	A	A	A	A	0 / 2
Wimbledon	Q2	1R	4R	1R	1R	2R	Q2	Q2	Q2	0 / 5
US Open	A	1R	4R	3R	2R	1R	A	A	A	0 / 5
Strike rate	0 / 0	0 / 3	0 / 4	0 / 3	0 / 4	0 / 3	0 / 0	0 / 1	0 / 0	0 / 18

== Career finals ==
=== Singles: 6 (6 losses) ===
Result	W/L	Date	Tournament	Surface	Opponent	Score
Loss	0–1	Jan 1982	Australian Open, Melbourne	Grass	(South Africa) Johan Kriek	2–6, 6–7, 7–6, 4–6
Loss	0–2	Mar 1982	Metz, France	Hard (i)	(United States) Erick Iskersky	4–6, 3–6
Loss	0–3	Aug 1982	Cincinnati, U.S.	Hard	(Czechoslovakia) Ivan Lendl	2–6, 6–7
Loss	0–4	Dec 1982	Australian Open, Melbourne	Grass	(United States) Johan Kriek	3–6, 3–6, 2–6
Loss	0–5	Feb 1983	Richmond WCT, U.S.	Carpet	(Argentina) Guillermo Vilas	3–6, 5–7, 4–6
Loss	0–6	Feb 1984	Richmond WCT, U.S.	Carpet	(United States) John McEnroe	3–6, 6–7^{(7–9)}

=== Doubles: 41 (18 wins, 23 losses) ===
Result	W/L	Date	Tournament	Surface	Partner	Opponents	Score
Loss	0–1	Nov 1979	Hong Kong	Carpet	(United States) Mark Turpin	(United States) Pat Du Pré (United States) Robert Lutz	3–6, 4–6
Win	1–1	Feb 1980	Denver, U.S.	Carpet	(South Africa) Kevin Curren	(Poland) Wojciech Fibak (Switzerland) Heinz Günthardt	7–5, 6–2
Loss	1–2	Mar 1980	Washington-2, U.S.	Carpet	(South Africa) Kevin Curren	(United States) Ferdi Taygan (United States) Brian Teacher	6–4, 3–6, 6–7
Loss	1–3	Aug 1980	North Conway, U.S.	Clay	(South Africa) Kevin Curren	(United States) Jimmy Connors (United States) Brian Gottfried	6–7, 2–6
Win	2–3	Aug 1980	Indianapolis, U.S.	Clay	(South Africa) Kevin Curren	(Poland) Wojciech Fibak (Czechoslovakia) Ivan Lendl	3–6, 7–6, 6–4
Win	3–3	Oct 1980	Barcelona, Spain	Clay	(Czechoslovakia) Ivan Lendl	(Czechoslovakia) Pavel Složil (Hungary) Balázs Taróczy	6–2, 6–7, 6–3
Win	4–3	Oct 1980	Basel, Switzerland	Hard (i)	(South Africa) Kevin Curren	(South Africa) Bob Hewitt (South Africa) Frew McMillan	6–7, 6–4, 6–4
Loss	4–4	Nov 1980	Bologna, Italy	Carpet	(Australia) Paul McNamee	(Hungary) Balázs Taróczy (United States) Butch Walts	6–2, 3–6, 0–6
Win	5–4	Jan 1981	Monterrey WCT, Mexico	Carpet	(South Africa) Kevin Curren	(South Africa) Johan Kriek (New Zealand) Russell Simpson	7–6, 6–3
Loss	5–5	Mar 1981	Brussels, Belgium	Carpet	(South Africa) Kevin Curren	(United States) Sandy Mayer (South Africa) Frew McMillan	6–4, 3–6, 3–6
Loss	5–6	Jun 1981	London/Queen's Club, UK	Grass	(South Africa) Kevin Curren	(United States) Pat Du Pré (United States) Brian Teacher	6–3, 6–7, 9–11
Win	6–6	Aug 1981	Indianapolis, U.S.	Clay	(South Africa) Kevin Curren	(Mexico) Raúl Ramírez (United States) Van Winitsky	6–3, 5–7, 7–5
Win	7–6	Oct 1981	Vienna, Austria	Hard (i)	(United States) Tim Wilkison	(United States) Sammy Giammalva Jr. (United States) Fred McNair	4–6, 6–3, 6–4
Win	8–6	Nov 1981	Stockholm, Sweden	Hard (i)	(South Africa) Kevin Curren	(United States) Sherwood Stewart (United States) Ferdi Taygan	6–7, 6–4, 6–0
Loss	8–7	Jan 1982	Masters Doubles WCT, London	Carpet	(South Africa) Kevin Curren	(Switzerland) Heinz Günthardt (Hungary) Balázs Taróczy	7–6, 3–6, 5–7, 4–6
Win	9–7	Feb 1982	Denver, U.S.	Carpet	(South Africa) Kevin Curren	(Australia) Phil Dent (Australia) Kim Warwick	6–4, 6–4
Win	10–7	Feb 1982	Memphis, U.S.	Carpet	(South Africa) Kevin Curren	(United States) Peter Fleming (United States) John McEnroe	7–6, 4–6, 6–2
Loss	10–8	Mar 1982	Munich-2 WCT, Germany	Carpet	(South Africa) Kevin Curren	(Australia) Mark Edmondson (Czechoslovakia) Tomáš Šmíd	6–4, 5–7, 2–6
Win	11–8	Apr 1982	Frankfurt, Germany	Carpet	(Australia) Mark Edmondson	(United States) Tony Giammalva (United States) Tim Mayotte	6–7, 6–3, 6–3
Win	12–8	Apr 1982	Houston WCT, U.S.	Clay	(South Africa) Kevin Curren	(Australia) Mark Edmondson (Australia) Peter McNamara	7–5, 6–4
Win	13–8	Aug 1982	Toronto, Canada	Hard	(South Africa) Kevin Curren	(United States) Peter Fleming (United States) John McEnroe	6–7, 7–5, 6–2
Loss	13–9	Aug 1982	Cincinnati, U.S.	Hard	(Australia) Mark Edmondson	(United States) Peter Fleming (United States) John McEnroe	2–6, 3–6
Win	14–9	Sep 1982	US Open, New York	Hard	(South Africa) Kevin Curren	(United States) Victor Amaya (United States) Hank Pfister	6–2, 6–7, 5–7, 6–2, 6–4
Loss	14–10	Oct 1982	Sydney Indoor, Australia	Hard (i)	(Australia) Mark Edmondson	(United States) John McEnroe (United States) Peter Rennert	3–6, 6–7
Win	15–10	Feb 1983	Philadelphia, U.S.	Carpet	(South Africa) Kevin Curren	(United States) Peter Fleming (United States) John McEnroe	6–4, 7–6
Win	16–10	Mar 1983	Munich WCT, Germany	Carpet	(South Africa) Kevin Curren	(Switzerland) Heinz Günthardt (Hungary) Balázs Taróczy	7–5, 2–6, 6–1
Win	17–10	Apr 1983	Houston WCT, U.S.	Clay	(South Africa) Kevin Curren	(United States) Mark Dickson (Czechoslovakia) Tomáš Šmíd	7–6, 6–7, 6–1
Win	18–10	Apr 1983	Las Vegas, U.S.	Hard	(South Africa) Kevin Curren	(United States) Tracy Delatte (United States) Johan Kriek	6–3, 7–5
Loss	18–11	May 1983	Forest Hills WCT, U.S.	Clay	(South Africa) Kevin Curren	(United States) Tracy Delatte (United States) Johan Kriek	7–6, 5–7, 3–6
Loss	18–12	Jun 1983	London/Queen's Club, UK	Grass	(South Africa) Kevin Curren	(United States) Brian Gottfried (Australia) Paul McNamee	4–6, 3–6
Loss	18–13	Sep 1983	Dallas, U.S.	Hard	(United States) Sherwood Stewart	(Nigeria) Nduka Odizor (United States) Van Winitsky	3–6, 5–7
Loss	18–14	Oct 1983	Tokyo Indoor, Japan	Carpet	(Australia) John Fitzgerald	(Australia) Mark Edmondson (United States) Sherwood Stewart	1–6, 4–6
Loss	18–15	Nov 1983	Wembley, UK	Carpet	(United States) Sherwood Stewart	(United States) Peter Fleming (United States) John McEnroe	3–6, 4–6
Loss	18–16	Dec 1983	Australian Open, Melbourne	Grass	(United States) Sherwood Stewart	(Australia) Mark Edmondson (Australia) Paul McNamee	3–6, 6–7
Loss	18–17	Feb 1984	Richmond WCT, U.S.	Carpet	(South Africa) Kevin Curren	(United States) John McEnroe (United States) Patrick McEnroe	6–7, 2–6
Loss	18–18	Mar 1984	Brussels, Belgium	Carpet	(South Africa) Kevin Curren	(United States) Tim Gullikson (United States) Tom Gullikson	4–6, 7–6, 6–7
Loss	18–19	Mar 1984	Milan, Italy	Carpet	(South Africa) Kevin Curren	(Czechoslovakia) Pavel Složil (Czechoslovakia) Tomáš Šmíd	4–6, 3–6
Loss	18–20	Feb 1985	Memphis, U.S.	Carpet	(South Africa) Kevin Curren	(Czechoslovakia) Pavel Složil (Czechoslovakia) Tomáš Šmíd	6–1, 3–6, 4–6
Loss	18–21	Apr 1985	Atlanta, U.S.	Carpet	(Czechoslovakia) Tomáš Šmíd	(United States) Paul Annacone (South Africa) Christo van Rensburg	4–6, 3–6
Loss	18–22	Aug 1987	Cincinnati, U.S.	Hard	(Australia) John Fitzgerald	(United States) Ken Flach (United States) Robert Seguso	5–7, 3–6
Loss	18–23	Apr 1988	Tokyo Outdoor, Japan	Hard	(United States) David Pate	(Australia) John Fitzgerald (United States) Johan Kriek	4–6, 7–6, 4–6

== Coaching career ==
Denton made his first head coaching debut at Texas A&M–Corpus Christi in 2001. In his five seasons there, he led the Islanders to three Southland Conference regular-season championships, two tournament championships, and the team's first-ever NCAA Tournament appearance. He was named Southland Conference Coach of the Year twice, in 2004 and 2005. He finished with a 64–48 overall record.

On August 8, 2006, Denton became the head men's tennis coach at Texas A&M University. After struggling for two years in Big 12 Conference play, Denton led the Aggies to a 5-1 conference record and 2nd-place finish in his third year, earning Big 12 Coach of the Year honors.

=== Coaching record ===
Record table
Season	Team	Overall	Conference	Standing	Postseason
Texas A&M–Corpus Christi Islanders (Southland Conference) (2001–2006)
2001–2002	Texas A&M–Corpus Christi	8–12			
2002–2003	Texas A&M–Corpus Christi	13–9			
2003–2004	Texas A&M–Corpus Christi	14–7		1st	
2004–2005	Texas A&M–Corpus Christi	19–8	6–0	1st	NCAA Second Round
2005–2006	Texas A&M–Corpus Christi	10–12	5–1	1st	
Texas A&M–Corpus Christi:		64–48			
Texas A&M Aggies (Big 12 Conference) (2006–present)
2006–2007	Texas A&M	15–12	1–5	7th	NCAA Second Round
2007–2008	Texas A&M	13–12	2–4	5th	NCAA Second Round
2008–2009	Texas A&M	17–9	5–1	2nd	NCAA Sweet Sixteen
2009–2010	Texas A&M	25–7	5–1	2nd	NCAA Sweet Sixteen
2010–2011	Texas A&M	29–6	5–1	2nd	NCAA Sweet Sixteen
2011–2012	Texas A&M	14-15	1-4	5th	
Texas A&M Aggies (Southeastern Conference) (2012–present)
2012–2013	Texas A&M	19-13	7-5	3rd	NCAA Sweet Sixteen
2013–2014	Texas A&M	25-7	10-2	2nd	NCAA Second Round
2014–2015	Texas A&M	24-5	11-1	1st	NCAA Elite Eight
2015–2016	Texas A&M	27-10	8-4	3rd	NCAA Second Round
2016–2017	Texas A&M	21-7	11-1	T-1st	NCAA Sweet Sixteen
2017–2018	Texas A&M	26-6	12-0	1st	NCAA Final Four
2018–2019	Texas A&M	21-8	10-2	3rd	NCAA Second Round
2019–2020	Texas A&M	12-3	4-0	X	Cancelled due to Covid19
2020–2021	Texas A&M	19-9	7-5	T-4th	NCAA Elite Eight
2021–2022	Texas A&M	22-14	7-5	6th	NCAA Second Round
2022–2023	Texas A&M	19-12	7-5	T-5th	NCAA Second Round
2023–2024	Texas A&M	20-11	7-5	T-4th	NCAA Sweet Sixteen
2024–2025	Texas A&M	18-11	9-5	T-4th	NCAA Sweet Sixteen
2025–2026	Texas A&M	20-10	10-4	T-3rd	NCAA Second Round
Texas A&M:		406–187	139–60		
Total:		470–235			
National champion Postseason invitational champion Conference regular season champion Conference regular season and conference tournament champion Division regular season champion Division regular season and conference tournament champion Conference tournament champion
