= John Sadri =

American tennis player

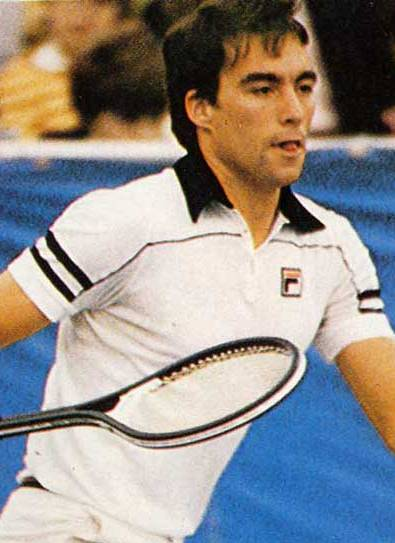
- Country (sports): United States
- Residence: Charlotte, North Carolina, U.S.
- Born: September 19, 1956 (age 69) Charlotte, North Carolina, U.S.
- Height: 6 ft 2 in (1.88 m)
- Turned pro: 1976
- Retired: 1987
- Plays: Right-handed (one-handed backhand)
- Prize money: $895,455

Singles
- Career record: 213–189 (53%)
- Career titles: 2
- Highest ranking: No. 14 (September 29, 1980)

Grand Slam singles results
- Australian Open: F (1979)
- French Open: 1R (1980)
- Wimbledon: QF (1984)
- US Open: 3R (1978)

Other tournaments
- WCT Finals: QF (1980)

Doubles
- Career record: 106–115 (48%)
- Career titles: 3
- Highest ranking: No. 12 (December 13, 1982)

Grand Slam doubles results
- Australian Open: F (1981, 1982)
- Wimbledon: SF (1979)
- US Open: SF (1983)

John Sadri (born September 19, 1956) is a former tennis player from the United States. Sadri, an All-American at North Carolina State, reached the finals of the 1978 men's NCAA singles championship, losing to John McEnroe in four sets. He reached the final of the 1979 Australian Open, losing in straight sets to Guillermo Vilas. He won two singles titles and achieved a career-high singles ranking of World No. 14 in September 1980. Sadri formerly ran a junior tennis academy at Russell Tennis Center in Charlotte, North Carolina.

== Grand Slam finals ==
=== Singles (1 runner-up) ===
Result	Year	Championship	Surface	Opponent	Score
Loss	1979	Australian Open	Grass	(Argentina) Guillermo Vilas	6–7^{(5–7)}, 3–6, 2–6

== Grand Slam tournament performance timeline ==
Key
W	F	SF	QF	#R	RR	Q#	DNQ	A	NH

(W) winner; (F) finalist; (SF) semifinalist; (QF) quarterfinalist; (#R) rounds 4, 3, 2, 1; (RR) round-robin stage; (Q#) qualification round; (DNQ) did not qualify; (A) absent; (NH) not held; (SR) strike rate (events won / competed); (W–L) win–loss record.

=== Singles ===
Tournament	1978	1979	1980	1981	1982	1983	1984	1985	1986	1987	SR
Australian Open	3R	F	QF	1R	4R	2R	4R	3R	NH	1R	0 / 9
French Open	A	A	1R	A	A	A	A	A	A	A	0 / 1
Wimbledon	A	3R	2R	3R	1R	1R	QF	2R	3R	2R	0 / 9
US Open	3R	2R	2R	1R	1R	2R	1R	1R	2R	A	0 / 9
Strike rate	0 / 2	0 / 3	0 / 4	0 / 3	0 / 3	0 / 3	0 / 3	0 / 3	0 / 2	0 / 2	0 / 28

== Career finals ==
=== Singles: 5 (2 wins / 3 losses) ===
Result	W/L	Date	Tournament	Surface	Opponent	Score
Loss	0–1	Dec 1979	Australian Open, Melbourne	Grass	(Argentina) Guillermo Vilas	6–7^{(4–7)}, 3–6, 2–6
Win	1–1	Jan 1980	Auckland, New Zealand	Hard	(United States) Tim Wilkison	6–4, 3–6, 6–3, 6–4
Loss	1–2	Mar 1981	Denver, U.S.	Carpet (i)	(United States) Gene Mayer	4–6, 4–6
Loss	1–3	Jan 1982	Mexico City WCT, Mexico	Carpet (i)	(Czechoslovakia) Tomáš Šmíd	6–3, 6–7, 6–4, 6–7, 2–6
Win	2–3	Feb 1982	Denver, U.S.	Carpet (i)	(Ecuador) Andrés Gómez	4–6, 6–1, 6–4

=== Doubles: 9 (3 wins / 6 losses) ===
Result	W/L	Date	Tournament	Surface	Partner	Opponents	Score
Loss	0–1	Aug 1979	North Conway, U.S.	Clay	(United States) Tim Wilkison	(Romania) Ion Țiriac (Argentina) Guillermo Vilas	4–6, 6–7
Loss	0–2	Jan 1980	Auckland, New Zealand	Hard	(United States) Tim Wilkison	(Austria) Peter Feigl (Australia) Rod Frawley	2–6, 5–7
Win	1–2	Jun 1980	Manchester, Great Britain	Grass	(United States) Tim Wilkison	(United States) Dennis Ralston (United States) Roscoe Tanner	6–3, 6–4
Loss	1–3	Oct 1980	Melbourne Indoor, Australia	Carpet (i)	(United States) Tim Wilkison	(United States) Fritz Buehning (United States) Ferdi Taygan	1–6, 2–6
Loss	1–4	Dec 1981	Sydney, Australia	Grass	(United States) Hank Pfister	(Australia) Peter McNamara (Australia) Paul McNamee	7–6, 6–7, 6–7
Loss	1–5	Dec 1981	Australian Open, Melbourne	Grass	(United States) Hank Pfister	(Australia) Mark Edmondson (Australia) Kim Warwick	3–6, 7–6, 3–6
Win	2–5	Jul 1982	Newport, U.S.	Grass	(United States) Andy Andrews	(Australia) Syd Ball (Australia) Rod Frawley	3–6, 7–6, 7–5
Win	3–5	Aug 1982	Stowe, U.S.	Hard	(United States) Andy Andrews	(United States) Mike Fishbach (United States) Eric Fromm	6–3, 6–4
Loss	3–6	Dec 1982	Australian Open, Melbourne	Grass	(United States) Andy Andrews	(Australia) John Alexander (Australia) John Fitzgerald	4–6, 6–7
