= Peter Feigl =

Austrian tennis player

- Country (sports): Austria
- Born: 30 November 1951 (age 73); Vienna, Austria
- Height: 1.83 m (6 ft 0 in)
- Plays: Right-handed
- Prize money: $260,885

Singles
- Career record: 104–115
- Career titles: 3
- Highest ranking: No. 35 (5 November 1979)

Grand Slam singles results
- Australian Open: QF (1978)
- French Open: 1R (1981)
- Wimbledon: 2R (1980)
- US Open: 2R (1980, 1983)

Doubles
- Career record: 53–68
- Career titles: 1
- Highest ranking: No. 160 (24 September 1984)

Peter Feigl (born 30 November 1951) is an Austrian former professional tennis player. He was a quarterfinalist in the 1978 Australian Open, defeating Ken Rosewall in what would be Rosewall's final Grand Slam match. He reached a highest singles ranking of world No. 35 in November 1979.

== ATP career finals ==
=== Singles (3 titles, 3 runner-ups) ===
Result	W/L	Date	Tournament	Surface	Opponent	Score
Win	1–0	Aug 1978	Cleveland, U.S.	Hard	(United States) Van Winitsky	4–6, 6–3, 6–3
Loss	1–1	Nov 1978	Manila, Philippines	Clay	(France) Yannick Noah	6–7, 0–6
Loss	1–2	Jan 1979	Auckland, New Zealand	Hard	(United States) Tim Wilkison	3–6, 6–4, 4–6, 6–2, 2–6
Loss	1–3	Mar 1979	Lagos, Nigeria	Clay	(Austria) Hans Kary	4–6, 6–3, 2–6
Win	2–3	Apr 1979	Cairo, Egypt	Clay	(Brazil) Carlos Kirmayr	7–5, 3–6, 6–1
Win	3–3	Mar 1980	Lagos, Nigeria	Clay	(Canada) Harry Fritz	6–2, 6–3, 6–2

=== Doubles (1 title, 2 runner-ups) ===
Result	W/L	Date	Tournament	Surface	Partner	Opponents	Score
Loss	0–1	Mar 1979	Lagos, Nigeria	Hard	(Egypt) Ismail El Shafei	(United States) Joel Bailey (United States) Bruce Kleege	4–6, 7–6, 3–6
Win	1–1	Jan 1980	Auckland, New Zealand	Hard	(Australia) Rod Frawley	(United States) John Sadri (United States) Tim Wilkison	6–2, 7–5
Loss	1–2	Oct 1983	Tel Aviv, Israel	Clay	(West Germany) Peter Elter	(United Kingdom) Colin Dowdeswell (Hungary) Zoltán Kuhárszky	4–6, 5–7
