= Peter McNamara =

Australian tennis player and coach (1955–2019)

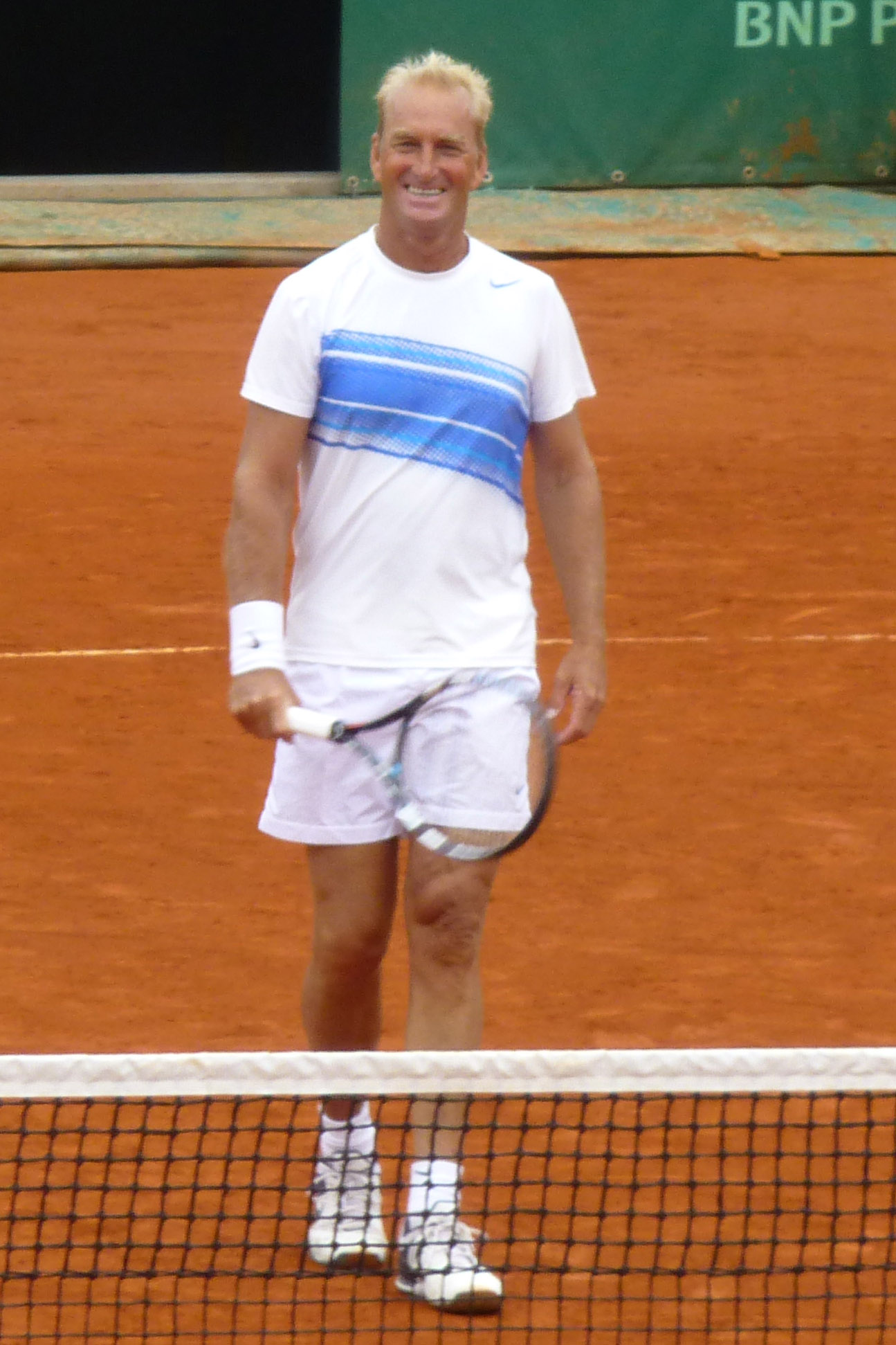
- McNamara during an exhibition game in Paris, in June 2012
- Country (sports): Australia
- Born: 5 July 1955 Melbourne, Australia
- Died: 20 July 2019 (aged 64) Sonthofen, Germany
- Height: 1.85 m (6 ft 1 in)
- Turned pro: 1974
- Retired: 1987
- Plays: Right-handed (one-handed backhand)
- Prize money: $1,046,935

Singles
- Career record: 205–137
- Career titles: 5
- Highest ranking: No. 7 (14 March 1983)

Grand Slam singles results
- Australian Open: SF (1980)
- French Open: QF (1982)
- Wimbledon: QF (1981)
- US Open: 3R (1980, 1981)

Doubles
- Career record: 238–116
- Career titles: 19
- Highest ranking: No. 3 (13 December 1982)

Grand Slam doubles results
- Australian Open: W (1979)
- French Open: QF (1981)
- Wimbledon: W (1980, 1982)
- US Open: F (1981)

Peter McNamara (5 July 1955 – 20 July 2019) was an Australian tennis player and coach.

McNamara won five singles titles and nineteen doubles titles in his career. A right-hander, McNamara reached his highest singles ATP-ranking on 14 March 1983 when he became world No. 7. McNamara and fellow Australian Paul McNamee won the 1980 and 1982 men's doubles championship at Wimbledon and the Australian Open doubles in 1979. McNamara's highest rank in doubles was No. 3.

After retiring as a player, McNamara coached professionals including Mark Philippoussis, Grigor Dimitrov, Matthew Ebden and Wang Qiang.

McNamara died on 20 July 2019, at the age of 64, from prostate cancer.

== Career finals ==
=== Singles: 12 (5 titles / 7 runner-ups) ===
| Result | W-L | Date | Tournament | Surface | Opponent | Score |
|---|---|---|---|---|---|---|
| Win | 1–0 | Jun 1979 | Berlin, Germany | Clay | (France) Patrice Dominguez | 6–4, 6–0, 6–7, 6–2 |
| Loss | 1–1 | Jul 1979 | Gstaad, Switzerland | Clay | (West Germany) Ulrich Pinner | 2–6, 4–6, 5–7 |
| Win | 2–1 | Jun 1980 | Brussels, Belgium | Clay | (Hungary) Balázs Taróczy | 7–6, 6–3, 6–0 |
| Loss | 2–2 | Oct 1980 | Melbourne Indoor, Australia | Carpet (i) | (United States) Vitas Gerulaitis | 5–7, 3–6 |
| Win | 3–2 | May 1981 | Hamburg, Germany | Clay | (United States) Jimmy Connors | 7–6, 6–1, 4–6, 6–4 |
| Win | 4–2 | Oct 1981 | Melbourne Indoor, Australia | Carpet (i) | (United States) Vitas Gerulaitis | 6–4, 1–6, 5–5 ret. |
| Loss | 4–3 | Jan 1982 | Delray Beach, US | Clay | (Czechoslovakia) Ivan Lendl | 4–6, 6–4, 4–6, 5–7 |
| Loss | 4–4 | Apr 1982 | Frankfurt, Germany | Carpet (i) | (Czechoslovakia) Ivan Lendl | 2–6, 2–6 |
| Loss | 4–5 | May 1982 | Hamburg, Germany | Clay | (Spain) José Higueras | 4–6, 6–7, 7–6, 6–3, 6–7 |
| Loss | 4–6 | Jun 1982 | Venice, Italy | Clay | (Argentina) José Luis Clerc | 6–7, 1–6 |
| Loss | 4–7 | Oct 1982 | Tokyo Indoor, Japan | Carpet (i) | (United States) John McEnroe | 6–7, 5–7 |
| Win | 5–7 | Mar 1983 | Brussels, Belgium | Carpet (i) | (Czechoslovakia) Ivan Lendl | 6–4, 4–6, 7–6 |

=== Doubles: 29 (19 titles / 10 runner-ups) ===
| Result | W-L | Date | Tournament | Surface | Partner | Opponents | Score |
|---|---|---|---|---|---|---|---|
| Loss | 0–1 | Dec 1975 | Sydney, Australia | Grass | (Australia) Chris Kachel | (Australia) Mark Edmondson (Australia) John Marks | 1–6, 1–6 |
| Win | 1–1 | Apr 1979 | Nice, France | Clay | (Australia) Paul McNamee | (Czechoslovakia) Pavel Složil (Czechoslovakia) Tomáš Šmíd | 6–1, 3–6, 6–2 |
| Win | 2–1 | Apr 1979 | Cairo, Egypt | Clay | (Australia) Paul McNamee | (India) Anand Amritraj (India) Vijay Amritraj | 7–5, 6–4 |
| Win | 3–1 | Jun 1979 | Brussels, Belgium | Clay | (United States) Billy Martin | (Brazil) Carlos Kirmayr (Hungary) Balázs Taróczy | 5–7, 7–5, 6–4 |
| Win | 4–1 | Sep 1979 | Palermo, Italy | Clay | (Australia) Paul McNamee | (Egypt) Ismail El Shafei (United Kingdom) John Feaver | 7–5, 7–6 |
| Win | 5–1 | Dec 1979 | Sydney, Australia | Grass | (Australia) Paul McNamee | (Australia) Steve Docherty (United States) Christopher Lewis | 7–6, 6–3 |
| Win | 6–1 | Jan 1980 | Australian Open, Melbourne | Grass | (Australia) Paul McNamee | (Australia) Cliff Letcher (Australia) Paul Kronk | 7–6, 6–2 |
| Win | 7–1 | Apr 1980 | Houston, US | Clay | (Australia) Paul McNamee | (United States) Marty Riessen (United States) Sherwood Stewart | 6–4, 6–4 |
| Loss | 7–2 | May 1980 | Forest Hills, US | Clay | (Australia) Paul McNamee | (United States) Peter Fleming (United States) John McEnroe | 2–6, 7–5, 2–6 |
| Win | 8–2 | Jul 1980 | Wimbledon, London | Grass | (Australia) Paul McNamee | (United States) Robert Lutz (United States) Stan Smith | 7–6, 6–3, 6–7, 6–4 |
| Loss | 8–3 | Jul 1980 | Båstad, Sweden | Clay | (United Kingdom) John Feaver | (Switzerland) Heinz Günthardt (Switzerland) Markus Günthardt | 4–6, 4–6 |
| Win | 9–3 | Dec 1980 | Sydney, Australia | Grass | (Australia) Paul McNamee | (United States) Vitas Gerulaitis (United States) Brian Gottfried | 6–2, 6–4 |
| Loss | 9–4 | Jan 1981 | Australian Open, Melbourne | Grass | (Australia) Paul McNamee | (Australia) Mark Edmondson (Australia) Kim Warwick | 5–7, 4–6 |
| Win | 10–4 | Jan 1981 | Masters Doubles WCT, London | Carpet (i) | (Australia) Paul McNamee | (United States) Victor Amaya (United States) Hank Pfister | 6–3, 2–6, 3–6, 6–3, 6–2 |
| Loss | 10–5 | May 1981 | Hamburg, Germany | Clay | (Australia) Paul McNamee | (Chile) Hans Gildemeister (Ecuador) Andrés Gómez | 4–6, 6–3, 4–6 |
| Win | 11–5 | Jul 1981 | Stuttgart, Germany | Clay | (Australia) Paul McNamee | (Australia) Mark Edmondson (United States) Mike Estep | 2–6, 6–4, 7–6 |
| Win | 12–5 | Aug 1981 | North Conway, US | Clay | (Switzerland) Heinz Günthardt | (Czechoslovakia) Pavel Složil (United States) Ferdi Taygan | 6–7, 7–5, 6–4 |
| Loss | 12–6 | Sep 1981 | US Open, New York | Hard | (Switzerland) Heinz Günthardt | (United States) Peter Fleming (United States) John McEnroe | def. |
| Win | 13–6 | Sep 1981 | Sawgrass Doubles, US | Clay | (Switzerland) Heinz Günthardt | (United States) Robert Lutz (United States) Stan Smith | 7–6, 3–6, 7–6, 5–7, 6–4 |
| Win | 14–6 | Oct 1981 | Melbourne Indoor, Australia | Carpet (i) | (Australia) Paul Kronk | (United States) Sherwood Stewart (United States) Ferdi Taygan | 3–6, 6–3, 6–4 |
| Win | 15–6 | Dec 1981 | Sydney, Australia | Grass | (Australia) Paul McNamee | (United States) Hank Pfister (United States) John Sadri | 6–7, 7–6, 7–6 |
| Win | 16–6 | Mar 1982 | Milan, Italy | Carpet (i) | (Switzerland) Heinz Günthardt | (Australia) Mark Edmondson (United States) Sherwood Stewart | 7–6, 7–6 |
| Win | 17–6 | Apr 1982 | Monte Carlo, Monaco | Clay | (Australia) Paul McNamee | (Australia) Mark Edmondson (United States) Sherwood Stewart | 6–7, 7–6, 6–3 |
| Loss | 17–7 | Apr 1982 | Houston, US | Clay | (Australia) Mark Edmondson | (South Africa) Kevin Curren (United States) Steve Denton | 5–7, 4–6 |
| Win | 18–7 | Jul 1982 | Wimbledon, London | Grass | (Australia) Paul McNamee | (United States) Peter Fleming (United States) John McEnroe | 6–3, 6–2 |
| Loss | 18–8 | Nov 1982 | São Paulo, Brazil | Clay | (United States) Ferdi Taygan | (Brazil) Carlos Kirmayr (Brazil) Cássio Motta | 3–6, 1–6 |
| Win | 19–8 | Feb 1983 | Memphis, US | Carpet (i) | (Australia) Paul McNamee | (United States) Tim Gullikson (United States) Tom Gullikson | 6–3, 5–7, 6–4 |
| Loss | 19–9 | Jul 1985 | Boston, US | Clay | (Australia) Paul McNamee | (Belgium) Libor Pimek (Socialist Federal Republic of Yugoslavia) Slobodan Živojinović | 6–2, 4–6, 6–7 |
| Loss | 19–10 | Oct 1986 | Sydney, Australia | Hard (i) | (Australia) Paul McNamee | (West Germany) Boris Becker (Australia) John Fitzgerald | 4–6, 6–7 |

Awards
| Preceded by Ivan Lendl | ATP Most Improved Player; 1982 | Succeeded by Jimmy Arias |
