= Mark Edmondson =

Australian tennis player

- Country (sports): Australia
- Born: June 28, 1954 (age 72) Gosford, New South Wales, Australia
- Height: 1.85 m (6 ft 1 in)
- Plays: Right-handed (one-handed backhand)

Singles
- Career record: 256–242 (51.21%)
- Career titles: 6
- Highest ranking: No. 15 (17 May 1982)

Grand Slam singles results
- Australian Open: W (1976)
- French Open: 2R (1977)
- Wimbledon: SF (1982)
- US Open: 3R (1977, 1981, 1983)

Doubles
- Career record: 507–259
- Career titles: 34

Grand Slam doubles results
- Australian Open: W (1980, 1981, 1983, 1984)
- French Open: W (1985)

Team competitions
- Davis Cup: W (1983)

Mark Edmondson (born 28 June 1954 in Gosford, New South Wales) is a retired Australian professional tennis player.

Edmondson entered the 1976 Australian Open ranked 212th in the world. After beating top seed Ken Rosewall in the semifinals, Edmondson beat defending champion John Newcombe in the final in four sets on a day when the wind was so severe that the players left the court for half an hour at the peak of the windstorm. When the storm arrived the temperature dropped from 104 degrees to 79 degrees in five minutes and prior to the storm, 130 spectators had been treated for heat exhaustion. Edmondson mastered the conditions better than Newcombe and served particularly well. He remains the lowest-ranked winner of a Grand Slam tournament since the ATP rankings were introduced in 1973. He is the last Australian to date to win the men's singles at the Australian Open.

Edmondson's best subsequent performance in Grand Slams was reaching the semifinals of the Australian Open in 1981 and Wimbledon in 1982. At Wimbledon 1982 he beat Vitas Gerulaitis in the quarterfinals before losing in straight sets to Jimmy Connors in the semis. This took him to a career-high singles ranking of #15. As a doubles player, he won 34 titles, including five in Grand Slams.

== Grand Slam performance ==
=== Singles performance timeline ===
Key
| W | F | SF | QF | #R | RR | Q# | DNQ | A | NH |

(W) winner; (F) finalist; (SF) semifinalist; (QF) quarterfinalist; (#R) rounds 4, 3, 2, 1; (RR) round-robin stage; (Q#) qualification round; (DNQ) did not qualify; (A) absent; (NH) not held; (SR) strike rate (events won / competed); (W–L) win–loss record.

| Tournament | 1975 | 1976 | 1977 | | 1978 | 1979 | 1980 | 1981 | 1982 | 1983 | 1984 | 1985 | 1986 | 1987 |
|---|---|---|---|---|---|---|---|---|---|---|---|---|---|---|
| Australian Open | 2R | W | QF | A | 2R | QF | 3R | SF | 1R | 3R | 2R | 1R | NH | 3R |
| French Open | A | 1R | 2R | | 1R | 1R | 1R | 1R | A | A | A | 1R | 1R | A |
| Wimbledon | 2R | 3R | 2R | | 2R | 1R | 1R | 2R | SF | 3R | 3R | 1R | 1R | A |
| US Open | A | 1R | 3R | | 1R | 1R | A | 3R | 2R | 3R | A | A | A | A |

=== Finals, 10 (6 wins, 4 losses) ===
==== Singles, 1 (1 win) ====
| Result | Year | Championship | Surface | Opponent | Score |
|---|---|---|---|---|---|
| Win | 1976 | Australian Open | Grass | (Australia) John Newcombe | 6–7, 6–3, 7–6, 6–1 |

==== Doubles, 7 (5 wins, 2 losses) ====
| Result | Year | Championship | Surface | Partner | Opponents | Score |
|---|---|---|---|---|---|---|
| Win | 1980 | Australian Open | Grass | (Australia) Kim Warwick | (Australia) Peter McNamara (Australia) Paul McNamee | 7–5, 6–4 |
| Win | 1981 | Australian Open (2) | Grass | (Australia) Kim Warwick | (United States) Hank Pfister (United States) John Sadri | 6–3, 6–7, 6–3 |
| Win | 1983 | Australian Open (3) | Grass | (Australia) Paul McNamee | (United States) Steve Denton (United States) Sherwood Stewart | 6–3, 7–6 |
| Loss | 1983 | French Open | Clay | (United States) Sherwood Stewart | (Sweden) Hans Simonsson (Sweden) Anders Järryd | 7–6^{(7–4)}, 6–4, 6–2 |
| Win | 1984 | Australian Open (4) | Grass | (United States) Sherwood Stewart | (Sweden) Joakim Nyström (Sweden) Mats Wilander | 6–2, 6–2, 7–5 |
| Loss | 1985 | Australian Open | Grass | (Australia) Kim Warwick | (United States) Paul Annacone (South Africa) Christo van Rensburg | 3–6, 7–6, 6–4, 6–4 |
| Win | 1985 | French Open | Clay | (Australia) Kim Warwick | (Israel) Shlomo Glickstein (Sweden) Hans Simonsson | 6–3, 6–4, 6–7, 6–3 |

==== Mixed doubles 2 (2 losses) ====
| Result | Year | Championship | Surface | Partner | Opponents | Score |
|---|---|---|---|---|---|---|
| Loss | 1980 | Wimbledon | Grass | (Australia) Dianne Fromholtz | (United States) Tracy Austin (United States) John Austin | 4–6, 7–6^{(8–6)}, 6–3 |
| Loss | 1986 | French Open | Clay | (South Africa) Rosalyn Fairbank | (United States) Kathy Jordan (United States) Ken Flach | 3–6, 7–6^{(7–3)}, 6–3 |

== Career finals ==
=== Singles: 12 (6 titles / 6 runner-ups) ===
| Result | W–L | Date | Tournament | Surface | Opponent | Score |
|---|---|---|---|---|---|---|
| Win | 1–0 | Jan 1976 | Australian Open, Melbourne | Grass | (Australia) John Newcombe | 6–7, 6–3, 7–6^{(8–6)}, 6–1 |
| Win | 2–0 | Oct 1976 | Brisbane, Australia | Grass | (Australia) Phil Dent | 3–6, 6–4, 6–4, 6–4 |
| Win | 3–0 | Oct 1978 | Brisbane, Australia | Grass | (Australia) John Alexander | 6–4, 7–6 |
| Loss | 3–1 | Jan 1979 | Hobart, Australia | Hard | (Argentina) Guillermo Vilas | 4–6, 4–6 |
| Loss | 3–2 | Jun 1979 | Surbiton, UK | Grass | (United States) Victor Amaya | 4–6, 5–7 |
| Win | 4–2 | Jan 1981 | Adelaide, Australia | Grass | (Australia) Brad Drewett | 7–5, 6–2 |
| Loss | 4–3 | Apr 1981 | Linz, Austria | Hard (i) | (Italy) Gianni Ocleppo | 5–7, 1–6 |
| Win | 5–3 | Jun 1981 | Bristol, UK | Grass | (United States) Roscoe Tanner | 6–3, 5–7, 6–4 |
| Win | 6–3 | Oct 1981 | Brisbane, Australia | Grass | (New Zealand) Chris Lewis | 7–6, 3–6, 6–4 |
| Loss | 6–4 | Oct 1981 | Tokyo Indoor, Japan | Carpet (i) | (United States) Vincent Van Patten | 2–6, 6–3, 3–6 |
| Loss | 6–5 | Nov 1981 | Hong Kong | Hard | (United States) Van Winitsky | 4–6, 7–6^{(9–7)}, 4–6 |
| Loss | 6–6 | Apr 1983 | Las Vegas, US | Hard | (United States) Jimmy Connors | 6–7^{(4–7)}, 1–6 |

=== Doubles: 68 (34 titles / 34 runner-ups) ===
| Result | W–L | Date | Tournament | Surface | Partner | Opponents | Score |
|---|---|---|---|---|---|---|---|
| Win | 1–0 | Dec 1975 | Sydney Outdoor, Australia | Grass | (Australia) John Marks | (Australia) Chris Kachel (Australia) Peter McNamara | 6–1, 6–1 |
| Loss | 1–1 | Apr 1976 | Palma de Mallorca, Spain | Clay | (Australia) John Marks | (United States) John Andrews (Australia) Colin Dibley | 3–6, 5–7 |
| Loss | 1–2 | Dec 1976 | Sydney Outdoor, Australia | Grass | (Australia) John Marks | (Australia) Syd Ball (Australia) Kim Warwick | 3–6, 6–7 |
| Win | 2–2 | Jul 1977 | Båstad, Sweden | Clay | (Australia) John Marks | (France) Jean-Louis Haillet (France) François Jauffret | 6–4, 6–0 |
| Loss | 2–3 | May 1978 | Florence, Italy | Clay | (Australia) John Marks | (Italy) Corrado Barazzutti (Italy) Adriano Panatta | 3–6, 7–6, 3–6 |
| Win | 3–3 | Jul 1978 | Gstaad, Switzerland | Clay | (Netherlands) Tom Okker | (South Africa) Bob Hewitt (Australia) Kim Warwick | 6–4, 1–6, 6–1, 6–4 |
| Win | 4–3 | Jul 1978 | Båstad, Sweden | Clay | (Australia) Bob Carmichael | (Hungary) Péter Szőke (Hungary) Balázs Taróczy | 7–5, 6–4 |
| Loss | 4–4 | Jul 1978 | Hilversum, Netherlands | Clay | (Australia) Bob Carmichael | (Netherlands) Tom Okker (Hungary) Balázs Taróczy | 6–7, 3–6 |
| Loss | 4–5 | Aug 1978 | Stowe, US | Hard | (Australia) Kim Warwick | (United States) Tim Gullikson (United States) Tom Gullikson | 6–3, 6–7, 3–6 |
| Loss | 4–6 | Sep 1978 | Hartford, US | Carpet | (United States) Van Winitsky | (United States) John McEnroe (United States) Bill Maze | 3–6, 6–3, 5–7 |
| Loss | 4–7 | Oct 1978 | Sydney Indoor, Australia | Hard (i) | (Australia) John Marks | (Australia) John Newcombe (Australia) Tony Roche | 4–6, 3–6 |
| Win | 5–7 | Nov 1978 | Hong Kong | Hard | (Australia) John Marks | (United States) Hank Pfister (United States) Brad Rowe | 5–7, 7–6, 6–1 |
| Loss | 5–8 | Nov 1978 | Taipei, Taiwan | Carpet | (Australia) John Marks | (United States) Sherwood Stewart (United States) Butch Walts | 2–6, 7–6, 6–7 |
| Loss | 5–9 | May 1979 | Hamburg, Germany | Clay | (Australia) John Marks | (Czechoslovakia) Jan Kodeš (Czechoslovakia) Tomáš Šmíd | 3–6, 1–6, 6–7 |
| Win | 6–9 | Jul 1979 | Gstaad, Switzerland | Clay | (Australia) John Marks | (Romania) Ion Țiriac (Argentina) Guillermo Vilas | 2–6, 6–1, 6–4 |
| Loss | 6–10 | Jul 1979 | Båstad, Sweden | Clay | (Australia) John Marks | (Switzerland) Heinz Günthardt (South Africa) Bob Hewitt | 2–6, 2–6 |
| Win | 7–10 | Nov 1979 | Taipei, Taiwan | Carpet | (Australia) John Marks | (United States) Pat DuPré (United States) Robert Lutz | 6–1, 3–6, 6–4 |
| Win | 8–10 | May 1980 | Rome, Italy | Clay | (Australia) Kim Warwick | (Hungary) Balázs Taróczy (United States) Eliot Teltscher | 7–6, 7–6 |
| Win | 9–10 | Jun 1980 | Surbiton, UK | Grass | (Australia) Kim Warwick | (Zimbabwe) Andrew Pattison (United States) Butch Walts | 7–6, 6–7, 6–7, 7–6, 15–13 |
| Loss | 9–11 | Jul 1980 | Gstaad, Switzerland | Clay | (Australia) Kim Warwick | (United Kingdom) Colin Dowdeswell (Egypt) Ismail El Shafei | 4–6, 4–6 |
| Win | 10–11 | Dec 1980 | Australian Open, Melbourne | Grass | (Australia) Kim Warwick | (Australia) Peter McNamara (Australia) Paul McNamee | 7–5, 6–4 |
| Win | 11–11 | Apr 1981 | Houston, US | Clay | (United States) Sherwood Stewart | (India) Anand Amritraj (United States) Fred McNair | 6–4, 6–3 |
| Loss | 11–12 | Jul 1981 | Stuttgart Outdoor, Germany | Clay | (United States) Mike Estep | (Australia) Paul McNamee (Australia) Peter McNamara | 6–2, 4–6, 6–7 |
| Win | 12–12 | Jul 1981 | Båstad, Sweden | Clay | (Australia) John Fitzgerald | (Sweden) Anders Järryd (Sweden) Hans Simonsson | 2–6, 7–5, 6–0 |
| Loss | 12–13 | Sep 1981 | San Francisco, US | Carpet | (United States) Sherwood Stewart | (United States) Peter Fleming (United States) John McEnroe | 2–6, 2–6 |
| Loss | 12–14 | Oct 1981 | Brisbane, Australia | Grass | (United States) Mike Estep | (Australia) Rod Frawley (New Zealand) Chris Lewis | 5–7, 6–4, 6–7 |
| Win | 13–14 | Dec 1981 | Australian Open, Melbourne | Grass | (Australia) Kim Warwick | (United States) Hank Pfister (United States) John Sadri | 6–3, 6–7, 6–3 |
| Win | 14–14 | Jan 1982 | Adelaide-2, Australia | Grass | (Australia) Kim Warwick | (United Kingdom) Andrew Jarrett (United Kingdom) Jonathan Smith | 7–5, 4–6, 7–6 |
| Win | 15–14 | Feb 1982 | Richmond WCT, US | Carpet | (Australia) Kim Warwick | (Australia) Syd Ball (West Germany) Rolf Gehring | 6–4, 6–2 |
| Win | 16–14 | Mar 1982 | Munich-2 WCT, Germany | Carpet | (Czechoslovakia) Tomáš Šmíd | (South Africa) Kevin Curren (United States) Steve Denton | 4–6, 7–5, 6–2 |
| Win | 17–14 | Mar 1982 | Rotterdam, Netherlands | Carpet | (United States) Sherwood Stewart | (United States) Fritz Buehning (South Africa) Kevin Curren | 7–5, 6–2 |
| Loss | 17–15 | Mar 1982 | Milan, Italy | Carpet | (United States) Sherwood Stewart | (Switzerland) Heinz Günthardt (Australia) Peter McNamara | 6–7, 6–7 |
| Win | 18–15 | Apr 1982 | Frankfurt, Germany | Carpet | (United States) Steve Denton | (United States) Tony Giammalva (United States) Tim Mayotte | 6–4, 6–7, 6–4 |
| Loss | 18–16 | Apr 1982 | Monte Carlo, Monaco | Clay | (United States) Sherwood Stewart | (Australia) Paul McNamee (Australia) Peter McNamara | 7–6, 6–7, 3–6 |
| Loss | 18–17 | Apr 1982 | Houston, US | Clay | (Australia) Peter McNamara | (South Africa) Kevin Curren (United States) Steve Denton | 5–7, 4–6 |
| Win | 19–17 | May 1982 | Hilton Head WCT, US | Clay | (Australia) Rod Frawley | (United States) Alan Waldman (United States) Van Winitsky | 6–1, 7–5 |
| Loss | 19–18 | Jun 1982 | Bristol, UK | Grass | (Australia) Kim Warwick | (United States) Tim Gullikson (United States) Tom Gullikson | 4–6, 6–7 |
| Win | 20–18 | Jul 1982 | Stuttgart Outdoor, Germany | Clay | (United States) Brian Teacher | (West Germany) Andreas Maurer (West Germany) Wolfgang Popp | 6–3, 6–1 |
| Win | 21–18 | Jul 1982 | Kitzbühel, Austria | Clay | (Australia) Kim Warwick | (Australia) Rod Frawley (Czechoslovakia) Pavel Složil | 4–6, 6–4, 6–3 |
| Win | 22–18 | Aug 1982 | Toronto, Canada | Hard | (United States) Steve Denton | (United States) John McEnroe (United States) Peter Fleming | 6–7, 7–5, 6–2 |
| Loss | 22–19 | Aug 1982 | Cincinnati, US | Hard | (United States) Steve Denton | (United States) Peter Fleming (United States) John McEnroe | 2–6, 3–6 |
| Loss | 22–20 | Sep 1982 | Sawgrass Doubles, US | Clay | (Australia) Kim Warwick | (United States) Brian Gottfried (Mexico) Raúl Ramírez | W/O |
| Loss | 22–21 | Oct 1982 | Sydney Indoor, Australia | Hard (i) | (United States) Steve Denton | (United States) John McEnroe (United States) Peter Rennert | 3–6, 6–7 |
| Loss | 22–22 | May 1983 | Hamburg, Germany | Clay | (United States) Brian Gottfried | (Switzerland) Heinz Günthardt (Hungary) Balázs Taróczy | 6–7, 6–4, 4–6 |
| Loss | 22–23 | Jun 1983 | French Open, Paris | Clay | (United States) Sherwood Stewart | (Sweden) Anders Järryd (Sweden) Hans Simonsson | 6–7, 4–6, 2–6 |
| Win | 23–23 | Jul 1983 | North Conway, US | Clay | (United States) Sherwood Stewart | (United States) Eric Fromm (United States) Drew Gitlin | 7–6, 6–1 |
| Win | 24–23 | Aug 1983 | Indianapolis, US | Clay | (United States) Sherwood Stewart | (Brazil) Carlos Kirmayr (Brazil) Cássio Motta | 6–3, 6–2 |
| Loss | 24–24 | Oct 1983 | Brisbane, Australia | Carpet | (Australia) Kim Warwick | (Australia) Pat Cash (Australia) Paul McNamee | 6–7, 6–7 |
| Win | 25–24 | Oct 1983 | Sydney Indoor, Australia | Hard (i) | (United States) Sherwood Stewart | (United States) John McEnroe (United States) Peter Rennert | 6–2, 6–4 |
| Win | 26–24 | Oct 1983 | Tokyo Indoor, Japan | Carpet | (United States) Sherwood Stewart | (United States) Steve Denton (Australia) John Fitzgerald | 6–1, 6–4 |
| Win | 27–24 | Dec 1983 | Australian Open, Melbourne | Grass | (Australia) Paul McNamee | (United States) Steve Denton (United States) Sherwood Stewart | 6–3, 7–6 |
| Win | 28–24 | Apr 1984 | Boca West, US | Hard | (United States) Sherwood Stewart | (United States) David Dowlen (Nigeria) Nduka Odizor | 4–6, 6–1, 6–4 |
| Loss | 28–25 | Apr 1984 | Luxembourg | Carpet | (United States) Sherwood Stewart | (Sweden) Anders Järryd (Czechoslovakia) Tomáš Šmíd | 3–6, 5–7 |
| Win | 29–25 | Apr 1984 | Monte Carlo, Monaco | Clay | (United States) Sherwood Stewart | (Sweden) Jan Gunnarsson (Sweden) Mats Wilander | 6–2, 6–1 |
| Loss | 29–26 | Oct 1984 | Sydney Indoor, Australia | Hard (i) | (United States) Sherwood Stewart | (Sweden) Anders Järryd (Sweden) Hans Simonsson | 4–6, 4–6 |
| Loss | 29–27 | Oct 1984 | Tokyo Indoor, Japan | Carpet | (United States) Sherwood Stewart | (United States) Tony Giammalva (United States) Sammy Giammalva Jr. | 6–7, 4–6 |
| Loss | 29–28 | Oct 1984 | Hong Kong | Hard | (Australia) Paul McNamee | (United States) Ken Flach (United States) Robert Seguso | 7–6, 3–6, 5–7 |
| Win | 30–28 | Dec 1984 | Australian Open, Melbourne | Grass | (United States) Sherwood Stewart | (Sweden) Joakim Nyström (Sweden) Mats Wilander | 6–2, 6–2, 7–5 |
| Loss | 30–29 | Jan 1985 | New York, US | Carpet | (United States) Sherwood Stewart | (United States) Peter Fleming (United States) John McEnroe | 3–6, 1–6 |
| Win | 31–29 | May 1985 | Munich, Germany | Clay | (Australia) Kim Warwick | (Spain) Sergio Casal (Spain) Emilio Sánchez | 4–6, 7–5, 7–5 |
| Win | 32–29 | Jun 1985 | French Open, Paris | Clay | (Australia) Kim Warwick | (Israel) Shlomo Glickstein (Sweden) Hans Simonsson | 6–3, 6–4, 6–7, 6–3 |
| Loss | 32–30 | Jul 1985 | Gstaad, Switzerland | Clay | (Australia) Brad Drewett | (Poland) Wojtek Fibak (Czechoslovakia) Tomáš Šmíd | 7–6, 4–6, 4–6 |
| Loss | 32–31 | Oct 1985 | Sydney Indoor, Australia | Hard (i) | (Australia) Kim Warwick | (Australia) John Fitzgerald (Sweden) Anders Järryd | 3–6, 2–6 |
| Loss | 32–32 | Dec 1985 | Australian Open, Melbourne | Grass | (Australia) Kim Warwick | (United States) Paul Annacone (South Africa) Christo van Rensburg | 7–6, 4–6, 4–6 |
| Win | 33–32 | Dec 1985 | Adelaide, Australia | Grass | (Australia) Kim Warwick | (Brazil) Nelson Aerts (United States) Tomm Warneke | 6–4, 6–4 |
| Loss | 33–33 | May 1986 | Rome, Italy | Clay | (United States) Sherwood Stewart | (France) Guy Forget (France) Yannick Noah | 6–7, 2–6 |
| Loss | 33–34 | Jun 1986 | Bristol, UK | Grass | (Australia) Wally Masur | (South Africa) Christo Steyn (South Africa) Danie Visser | 7–6, 6–7, 10–12 |
| Win | 34–34 | Feb 1987 | Sydney Outdoor, Australia | Grass | (Australia) Brad Drewett | (Australia) Peter Doohan (Australia) Laurie Warder | 6–4, 4–6, 6–2 |
