= Chris Lewis (tennis) =

New Zealand tennis player (born 1957)

Chris Lewis ONZM
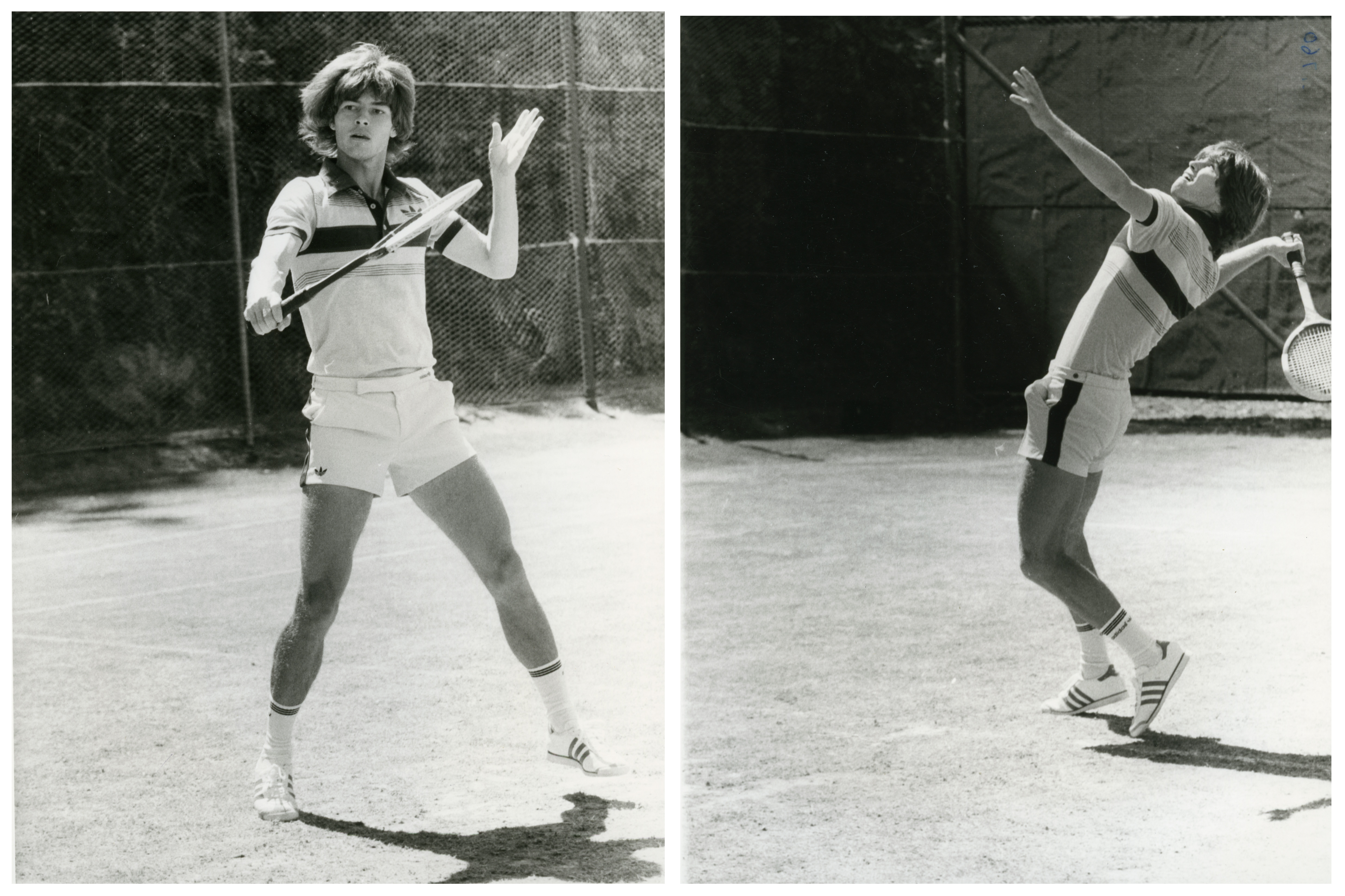
- Full name: Christopher John Lewis
- Country (sports): New Zealand
- Residence: Irvine, California, US
- Born: 9 March 1957 (age 69) Auckland, New Zealand
- Height: 1.80 m (5 ft 11 in)
- Turned pro: 1975
- Retired: 1986
- Plays: Right-handed (one-handed backhand)
- Prize money: $647,550

Singles
- Career record: 237–196 (54.7%)
- Career titles: 3
- Highest ranking: No. 19 (16 April 1984)

Grand Slam singles results
- Australian Open: 3R (1977^{Dec}, 1981)
- French Open: 3R (1977)
- Wimbledon: F (1983)
- US Open: 3R (1982)

Doubles
- Career record: 183–161 (53.2%)
- Career titles: 8
- Highest ranking: No. 46 (14 January 1985)

Grand Slam doubles results
- Australian Open: QF (1980)
- French Open: QF (1982)
- Wimbledon: QF (1981)
- US Open: 2R (1981)

Personal details
- Relatives: Geneva Lewis (daughter); Mark Lewis (brother); David Lewis (brother)

Christopher John Lewis ONZM (born 9 March 1957) is a former New Zealand professional tennis player. Lewis reached the 1983 Wimbledon singles final as an unseeded player. He won three singles titles and achieved a career-high singles ranking of world No. 19 in April 1984. He also won eight doubles titles during his 12 years on the tour. Lewis was coached by Harry Hopman and Tony Roche.

Lewis is the third (and as of 2026 the most recent) man from New Zealand to reach a major singles final, after Anthony Wilding and Onny Parun.

== Early life ==
Lewis was born in Auckland, New Zealand.

His father, Jim, was a keen club tennis player and encouraged Lewis to take-up the sport aged six.

He received his secondary education at Marcellin College and Lynfield College. He is the eldest of three sons. His brothers are David Lewis and Mark Lewis who also had competitive tennis careers.

== Tennis career ==
=== Juniors ===
Lewis reached the No. 1 junior world ranking in 1975, winning the Wimbledon boys' singles title (def. Ricardo Ycaza) and reaching the final of the US Open boys' singles (lost to Howard Schoenfield).

=== Pro tour ===
In reaching the 1983 Wimbledon final, after a five-set win over Kevin Curren in the semifinals, Lewis became the seventh unseeded man and only the second New Zealander after Anthony Wilding (who won four times between 1910 and 1913) to reach a Wimbledon singles final. He lost the final to John McEnroe in three sets.

He also reached the final at the Cincinnati Masters in 1981, again losing to John McEnroe in straight sets.

== Grand Slam finals ==
Result	Year	Championship	Surface	Opponent	Score
Loss	1983	Wimbledon	Grass	(United States) John McEnroe	2–6, 2–6, 2–6

== ATP Masters Series finals ==
Result	Year	Tournament	Surface	Opponent	Score
Loss	1981	Cincinnati Masters	Hard	(United States) John McEnroe	3–6, 4–6

== Career finals ==
=== Singles: 10 (3 titles, 7 runner-ups) ===
Winner – Legend (pre/post 2009) Grand Slam tournaments (0–1) ATP Masters Series / ATP World Tour Masters 1000 (0–1) ATP International Series Gold / ATP World Tour 500 Series (0–1) ATP International Series / ATP World Tour 250 Series (3–4)	Finals by surface Hard (1–2) Clay (2–1) Grass (0–4) Carpet (0–0)

Result	W/L	Date	Tournament	Surface	Opponent	Score
Loss	0–1	Dec 1977	Adelaide, Australia	Grass	(United States) Tim Gullikson	6–3, 4–6, 6–3, 2–6, 4–6
Win	1–1	Jul 1978	Kitzbühel, Austria	Clay	(Czechoslovakia) Vladimír Zedník	6–1, 6–4, 6–0
Loss	1–2	Mar 1981	Stuttgart Indoor, Germany	Hard (i)	(Czechoslovakia) Ivan Lendl	3–6, 0–6, 7–6, 3–6
Win	2–2	May 1981	Munich, Germany	Clay	(France) Christophe Roger-Vasselin	4–6, 6–2, 2–6, 6–1, 6–1
Loss	2–3	Aug 1981	Cincinnati, United States	Hard	(United States) John McEnroe	3–6, 4–6
Loss	2–4	Oct 1981	Brisbane, Australia	Grass	(Australia) Mark Edmondson	6–7, 6–3, 4–6
Loss	2–5	Dec 1981	Sydney, Australia	Grass	(United States) Tim Wilkison	4–6, 6–7, 3–6
Loss	2–6	Apr 1982	Hilton Head, United States	Clay	(United States) Van Winitsky	4–6, 4–6
Loss	2–7	Jun 1983	Wimbledon, London	Grass	(United States) John McEnroe	2–6, 2–6, 2–6
Win	3–7	Jan 1985	Auckland, New Zealand	Hard	(Australia) Wally Masur	7–5, 6–0, 2–6, 6–4

=== Doubles: 16 (8 titles, 8 runner-ups) ===
Result	W–L	Date	Tournament	Surface	Partner	Opponents	Score
Win	1–0	Jan 1977	Auckland, New Zealand	Grass	(New Zealand) Russell Simpson	(Australia) Peter Langsford (United Kingdom) Jonathan Smith	7–6, 6–4
Loss	1–1	Apr 1977	Nice, France	Clay	(New Zealand) Chris Kachel	(Romania) Ion Țiriac (Argentina) Guillermo Vilas	4–6, 1–6
Win	2–1	Apr 1977	Florence, Italy	Clay	(New Zealand) Russell Simpson	(Colombia) Iván Molina (Colombia) Jairo Velasco	2–6, 7–6, 6–2
Win	3–1	Jul 1978	Kitzbühel, Austria	Clay	(United States) Mike Fishbach	(Czechoslovakia) Pavel Huťka (Czechoslovakia) Pavel Složil	6–7, 6–4, 6–3
Loss	3–2	Aug 1978	Indianapolis, US	Clay	(United States) Jeff Borowiak	(United States) Gene Mayer (United States) Hank Pfister	3–6, 1–6
Win	4–2	Nov 1978	Buenos Aires, Argentina	Clay	(United States) Van Winitsky	(Argentina) José Luis Clerc (Chile) Belus Prajoux	6–4, 3–6, 6–0
Loss	4–3	May 1980	São Paulo, Brazil	Carpet	(New Zealand) David Carter	(India) Anand Amritraj (United States) Fritz Buehning	6–7, 2–6
Loss	4–4	May 1980	Munich, West Germany	Clay	(New Zealand) David Carter	(Switzerland) Heinz Günthardt (South Africa) Bob Hewitt	6–7, 1–6
Loss	4–5	Jul 1980	Stuttgart, West Germany	Clay	(South Africa) John Yuill	(Switzerland) Colin Dowdeswell (South Africa) Frew McMillan	3–6, 4–6
Loss	4–6	Jul 1980	Kitzbühel, Austria	Clay	(Brazil) Carlos Kirmayr	(West Germany) Klaus Eberhard (West Germany) Ulrich Marten	4–6, 6–3, 4–6
Loss	4–7	Apr 1981	Nice, France	Clay	(Czechoslovakia) Pavel Složil	(France) Yannick Noah (France) Pascal Portes	6–4, 3–6, 4–6
Win	5–7	Oct 1981	Brisbane, Australia	Grass	(Australia) Rod Frawley	(Australia) Mark Edmondson (United States) Mike Estep	7–5, 4–6, 7–6^{(7–4)}
Win	6–7	Jan 1983	Auckland, New Zealand	Hard	(New Zealand) Russell Simpson	(Australia) David Graham (Australia) Laurie Warder	7–6, 6–3
Win	7–7	May 1983	Munich, West Germany	Clay	(Czechoslovakia) Pavel Složil	(Sweden) Anders Järryd (Czechoslovakia) Tomáš Šmíd	6–4, 6–2
Loss	7–8	Apr 1984	Aix-en-Provence, France	Clay	(Australia) Wally Masur	(Australia) Pat Cash (Australia) Paul McNamee	4–6, 6–3, 6–4
Win	8–8	Jan 1985	Auckland, New Zealand	Hard	(Australia) John Fitzgerald	(Australia) Broderick Dyke (Australia) Wally Masur	7–6, 6–2

== Grand Slam singles performance timeline ==
Key
W	F	SF	QF	#R	RR	Q#	DNQ	A	NH

(W) winner; (F) finalist; (SF) semifinalist; (QF) quarterfinalist; (#R) rounds 4, 3, 2, 1; (RR) round-robin stage; (Q#) qualification round; (DNQ) did not qualify; (A) absent; (NH) not held; (SR) strike rate (events won / competed); (W–L) win–loss record.

Tournament	1975	1976	1977		1978	1979	1980	1981	1982	1983	1984	1985	SR
Australian Open	A	2R	1R	3R	A	1R	1R	3R	3R	3R	2R	2R	0 / 10
French Open	Q2	A	3R		2R	2R	2R	2R	2R	1R	1R	2R	0 / 9
Wimbledon	Q3	2R	1R		1R	A	2R	2R	3R	F	2R	2R	0 / 9
US Open	A	A	A		1R	1R	A	2R	3R	2R	1R	A	0 / 6
Strike rate	0 / 0	0 / 2	0 / 4		0 / 3	0 / 3	0 / 3	0 / 4	0 / 4	0 / 4	0 / 4	0 / 3	0 / 34

Note: The Australian Open was held twice in 1977, in January and December.

== After tennis ==
In the 1999 New Zealand general election, Lewis unsuccessfully stood for parliament as a list candidate for the Libertarianz party.

Now a resident in Irvine, California, Lewis is the co-founder of the Brymer Lewis Tennis Academy, based at the Orange County Great Park Sports Complex in Irvine.

== Recognition ==
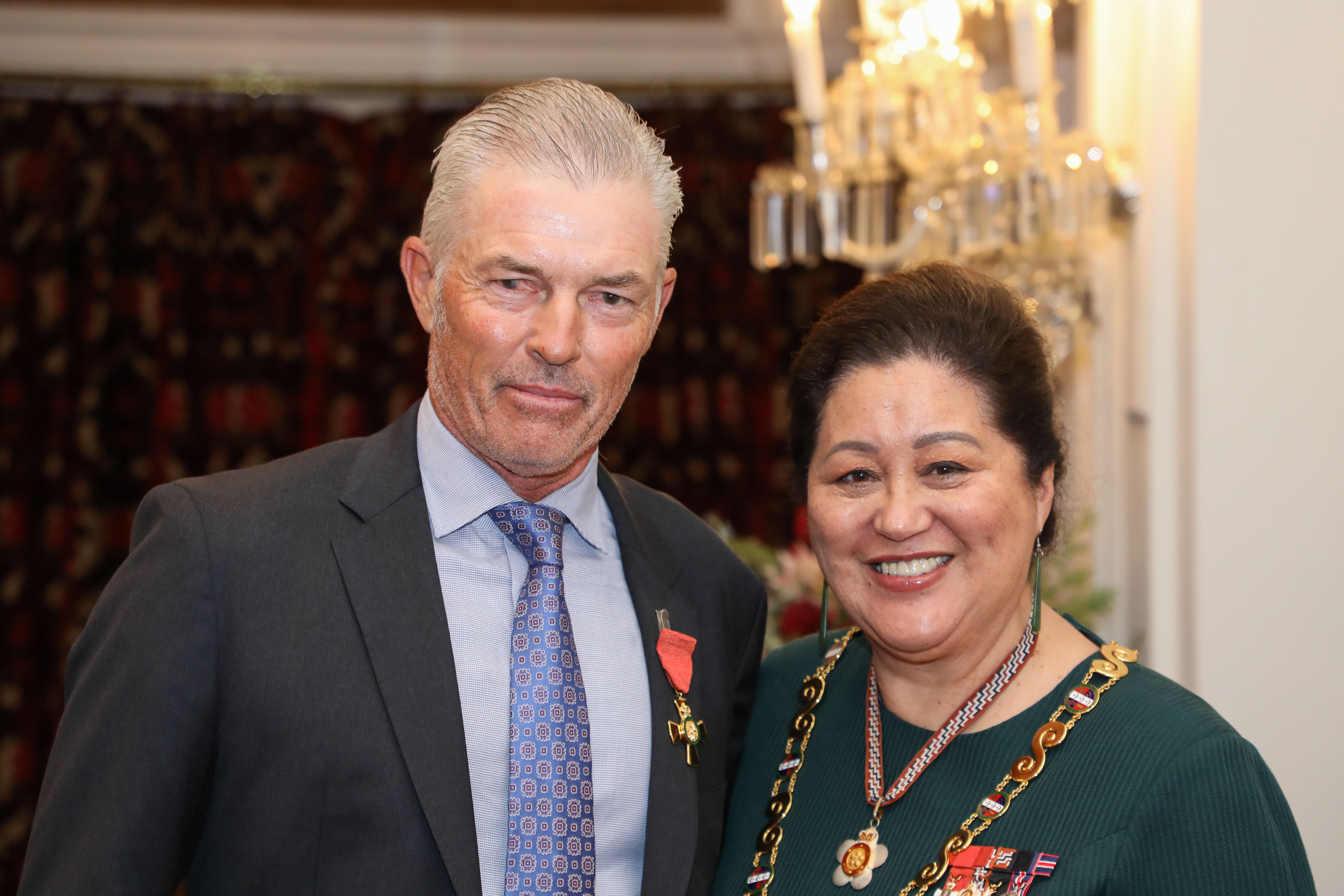
Lewis (left), after his investiture as an Officer of the New Zealand Order of Merit by the governor-general, Dame Cindy Kiro, at Government House, Wellington, on 17 September 2025

In the 2024 King’s Birthday Honours, Lewis was appointed an Officer of the New Zealand Order of Merit, for services to tennis.

== Personal life ==
Lewis is married with 3 children. His daughter Geneva Lewis, born 1998, is a violinist.

Awards
Preceded by 1982 New Zealand men's eight	New Zealand Sportsman of the Year; 1983	Succeeded by Ian Ferguson
