= Rod Frawley =

Australian tennis player

- Country (sports): Australia
- Residence: Clontarf, Australia
- Born: 8 September 1952 (age 72); Brisbane, Australia
- Height: 185 cm (6 ft 1 in)
- Plays: Right-handed (one-handed backhand)
- Prize money: $256,333

Singles
- Career record: 110–144
- Career titles: 1
- Highest ranking: No. 43 (22 December 1980)

Grand Slam singles results
- Australian Open: QF (1979)
- French Open: 2R (1981)
- Wimbledon: SF (1981)

Doubles
- Career record: 153–129
- Career titles: 5
- Highest ranking: No. 23 (3 March 1980)

Grand Slam doubles results
- Australian Open: QF (1978–81, 1983)
- Wimbledon: QF (1981)

Rod Frawley (born 8 September 1952) is a former tennis player from Australia, who won one singles title (1982, Adelaide) and five doubles titles during his professional career. The right-hander reached his highest ATP singles ranking of world No. 43 in December 1980. His highest ranking in doubles, world No. 23, was achieved in March 1980.

Frawley reached the semifinals of Wimbledon in 1981, before losing to eventual champion John McEnroe.

He is the older brother of John Frawley.

== Career finals ==
=== Singles (1 title, 1 runner-up) ===
Result	W/L	Date	Tournament	Surface	Opponent	Score
Win	1–0	Jan 1982	Adelaide, Australia	Grass	(United States) Lloyd Bourne	2–6, 6–3, 6–2
Loss	1–1	Dec 1982	Melbourne, Australia	Grass	(Australia) Pat Cash	4–6, 6–7

=== Doubles (5 titles, 11 runner-ups) ===
Result	W/L	Date	Tournament	Surface	Partner	Opponents	Score
Loss	0–1	Sep 1978	Bournemouth, UK	Clay	(Australia) David Carter	(Netherlands) Louk Sanders (Netherlands) Rolf Thung	3–6, 4–6
Loss	0–2	Oct 1979	Maui, US	Hard	(Paraguay) Francisco González	(United Kingdom) John Lloyd (United States) Nick Saviano	5–7, 4–6
Win	1–2	Oct 1979	Sydney, Australia	Hard	(Paraguay) Francisco González	(India) Vijay Amritraj (United States) Pat DuPré	walkover
Loss	1–3	Oct 1979	Tokyo, Japan	Clay	(Paraguay) Francisco González	(Australia) Colin Dibley (Paraguay) Pat DuPré	6–3, 1–6, 1–6
Win	2–3	Jan 1980	Auckland, New Zealand	Hard	(Austria) Peter Feigl	(United States) John Sadri (United States) Tim Wilkison	6–2, 7–5
Loss	2–4	Mar 1980	Memphis, US	Carpet (i)	(Czechoslovakia) Tomáš Šmíd	(United States) Brian Gottfried (United States) John McEnroe	3–6, 7–6, 6–7
Win	3–4	Jun 1980	London/Queen's, UK	Grass	(Australia) Geoff Masters	(Australia) Paul McNamee (United States) Sherwood Stewart	6–2, 4–6, 11–9
Loss	3–5	Oct 1980	Brisbane, Australia	Grass	(Australia) Phil Dent	(United States) John McEnroe (United States) Matt Mitchell	6–8
Win	4–5	Oct 1981	Brisbane, Australia	Grass	(New Zealand) Chris Lewis	(Australia) Mark Edmondson (United States) Mike Estep	7–5, 4–6, 7–6^{(7–4)}
Loss	4–6	Mar 1982	Linz, Austria	Clay	(Australia) Paul Kronk	(Sweden) Anders Järryd (Sweden) Hans Simonsson	2–6, 0–6
Win	5–6	May 1982	Hilton Head WCT, US	Clay	(Australia) Mark Edmondson	(United States) Alan Waldman (United States) Van Winitsky	6–1, 7–5
Loss	5–7	Jul 1982	Newport, US	Grass	(Australia) Syd Ball	(United States) John Andrews (United States) John Sadri	6–3, 6–7, 5–7
Loss	5–8	Jul 1982	Kitzbühel, Austria	Clay	(Czechoslovakia) Pavel Složil	(Australia) Mark Edmondson (Australia) Kim Warwick	6–4, 4–6, 3–6
Loss	5–9	Oct 1982	Melbourne Indoor, Australia	Carpet (i)	(Australia) Syd Ball	(Paraguay) Francisco González (United States) Matt Mitchell	6–7, 6–7
Loss	5–10	Dec 1983	Sydney, Australia	Grass	(Australia) Broderick Dyke	(United States) Mike Bauer (Australia) Pat Cash	6–7, 4–6
Loss	5–11	Dec 1983	Adelaide, Australia	Grass	(Australia) Broderick Dyke	(Australia) Craig Miller (United States) Eric Sherbeck	3–6, 6–4, 4–6
