= 1982 Taipei International Championships – Singles =

Singles
- 1982 Taipei International Championships

Final
- Champion: (United States) Brad Gilbert
- Runner-up: (United States) Craig Wittus
- Score: 6–1, 6–4

Details
- Draw: 32 (4Q)
- Seeds: 8

Events
Singles	Doubles
← 1981 ·	Taipei Grand Prix	· 1983 →

Robert Van't Hof was the defending champion, but lost in the quarterfinals to Brad Gilbert.

Gilbert won the title by defeating Craig Wittus 6–1, 6–4 in the final.

== Seeds ==
1. (Australia) Kim Warwick (second round, retired)
2. (France) Dominique Bedel (second round)
3. (United States) Van Winitsky (first round)
4. (Australia) Phil Dent (quarterfinals)
5. (United States) Robert Van't Hof (quarterfinals)
6. (United States) Tim Wilkison (semifinals)
7. (United States) Pat DuPré (second round)
8. (France) Guy Forget (semifinals)

== Draw ==
=== Key ===
- Q = Qualifier
- WC = Wild card
- LL = Lucky loser
- Alt = Alternate
- SE = Special exempt
- PR = Protected ranking
- ITF = ITF entry
- JE = Junior exempt
- w/o = Walkover
- r = Retired
- d = Defaulted
- SR = Special ranking

=== Finals ===
Semifinals
(United States) Brad Gilbert	6	6
8	(France) Guy Forget	2	3
Q	(United States) Craig Wittus	6	7
6	(United States) Tim Wilkison	3	5

Final
(United States) Brad Gilbert	6	6
Q	(United States) Craig Wittus	1	4

=== Top half ===
First round
1	(Australia) K Warwick	6	6
(United States) D Gitlin	4	3
(United States) B Gilbert	6	6
(United States) J Brown	1	3
(Japan) T Fukui	6	6
(United States) M Estep	2	3
(West Germany) K Eberhard	3	1
5	(United States) R Van't Hof	6	6
4	(Australia) P Dent	6	6
(United States) J Gurfein	1	2
(United States) M Bauer	6	1	6
(Austria) P Feigl	2	6	3
(Zimbabwe) A Pattison	6	2	6
(United States) M Davis	4	6	4
(United States) M Brunnberg	5	2
8	(France) G Forget	7	6

Second round
1	(Australia) K Warwick	1	r
(United States) B Gilbert	6
(Japan) T Fukui	6	6	0
5	(United States) R Van't Hof	7	1	6
4	(Australia) P Dent	6	6
(United States) M Bauer	2	4
(Zimbabwe) A Pattison	3	7	3
8	(France) G Forget	6	5	6

Quarterfinals
(United States) B Gilbert	6	6	6
5	(United States) R Van't Hof	7	4	4
4	(Australia) P Dent	5	7	4
8	(France) G Forget	7	5	6

Semifinals
(United States) B Gilbert	6	6
8	(France) G Forget	2	3

=== Bottom half ===
First round
7	(United States) P DuPré	3	6	6
(United States) L Stefanki	6	2	4
(United States) T Cain	2	2
Q	(United States) C Wittus	6	6
(Chinese Taipei) Wu Chang-rung	6	1	1
(Australia) CA Miller	4	6	6
(United States) M Strode	6	6
3	(United States) V Winitsky	3	1
6	(United States) T Wilkison	7	6
(United States) S Krulevitz	6	1
Q	(Canada) G Michibata	6	7
(Australia) C Johnstone	3	6
(United States) J Canter	1	4
Q	(United States) M Leach	6	6
Q	(West Germany) M Westphal	4	4
2	(France) D Bedel	6	6

Second round
7	(United States) P DuPré	3	6	2
Q	(United States) C Wittus	6	4	6
(Australia) CA Miller	3	5
(United States) M Strode	6	7
6	(United States) T Wilkison	6	6
Q	(Canada) G Michibata	4	1
Q	(United States) M Leach	7	6
2	(France) D Bedel	6	5

Quarterfinals
Q	(United States) C Wittus	6	4	6
(United States) M Strode	3	6	1
6	(United States) T Wilkison	3	6	7
Q	(United States) M Leach	6	3	5

Semifinals
Q	(United States) C Wittus	6	7
6	(United States) T Wilkison	3	5
