= 1982 Taipei International Championships – Doubles =

Doubles
- 1982 Taipei International Championships

Final
- Champions: (United States) Larry Stefanki (United States) Robert Van't Hof
- Runners-up: (United States) Fred McNair (United States) Tim Wilkison
- Score: 6–3, 7–6

Details
- Draw: 16
- Seeds: 4

Events
Singles	Doubles
← 1981 ·	Taipei Grand Prix	· 1983 →

Mike Bauer and John Benson were the defending champions, but lost in the first round to Bill Cowan and Glenn Michibata.

Larry Stefanki and Robert Van't Hof won the title by defeating Fred McNair and Tim Wilkison 6–3, 7–6 in the final.

== Seeds ==
1. (n/a)
2. (United States) Charles Strode / (United States) Morris Strode (first round)
3. (United States) Martin Davis / (United States) Drew Gitlin (semifinals)
4. (United States) Larry Stefanki / (United States) Robert Van't Hof (champions)

== Draw ==
=== Key ===
- Q = Qualifier
- WC = Wild card
- LL = Lucky loser
- Alt = Alternate
- SE = Special exempt
- PR = Protected ranking
- ITF = ITF entry
- JE = Junior exempt
- w/o = Walkover
- r = Retired
- d = Defaulted
- SR = Special ranking

=== Draw ===
First round
(Canada) B Cowan (Canada) G Michibata	7	4	6
(United States) M Bauer (United States) J Benson	6	6	4
(United States) D Dowlen (United States) J Hoffman	7	6
(France) D Bedel (Canada) J Brabenec	5	3
4	(United States) L Stefanki (United States) R Van't Hof	6	2	6
(United States) G Holroyd (United States) E Sherbeck	0	6	4
(United States) Nial Brash (United States) D Pate	6	6
(United States) P DuPré (United States) M Estep	4	4
(United States) S Krulevitz (United States) M Leach	4	7	6
(United States) C Leeds (United States) D Siegler	6	6	3
(Zimbabwe) A Pattison (United States) B Walts	4	4
3	(United States) M Davis (United States) D Gitlin	6	6
(United States) F McNair (United States) T Wilkison	6	6
(United States) M Brunnberg (United States) C Wittus	4	2
(Australia) C Johnstone (Australia) CA Miller	2	7	6
2	(United States) C Strode (United States) M Strode	6	6	3

Quarterfinals
(Canada) B Cowan (Canada) G Michibata	4	5
(United States) D Dowlen (United States) J Hoffman	6	7
4	(United States) L Stefanki (United States) R Van't Hof	7	4	4
(United States) Nial Brash (United States) D Pate	6	6	6
(United States) S Krulevitz (United States) M Leach	2	3
3	(United States) M Davis (United States) D Gitlin	6	6
(United States) F McNair (United States) T Wilkison	7	6
(Australia) C Johnstone (Australia) CA Miller	6	4

Semifinals
(United States) D Dowlen (United States) J Hoffman	4	6
4	(United States) L Stefanki (United States) R Van't Hof	6	7
3	(United States) M Davis (United States) D Gitlin	2	6
(United States) F McNair (United States) T Wilkison	6	7

Final
4	(United States) L Stefanki (United States) R Van't Hof	6	7
(United States) F McNair (United States) T Wilkison	3	6
