= 1984 Taipei International Championships – Singles =

Singles
- 1984 Taipei International Championships

Final
- Champion: (United States) Brad Gilbert
- Runner-up: (Australia) Wally Masur
- Score: 6–3, 6–3

Details
- Draw: 32 (1WC/4Q)
- Seeds: 8

Events
Singles	Doubles
- Pacific Cup International

Nduka Odizor was the defending champion, but lost in the first round to Lloyd Bourne.

Brad Gilbert won the title by defeating Wally Masur 6–3, 6–3 in the final.

== Seeds ==
1. (United States) Brad Gilbert (champion)
2. (India) Ramesh Krishnan (semifinals)
3. (United States) Mike Bauer (second round)
4. (United States) David Pate (first round)
5. (United States) Terry Moor (first round)
6. (n/a)
7. (United States) Marty Davis (quarterfinals)
8. (United States) Tom Gullikson (first round)

== Draw ==
Key

- Q = Qualifier
- WC = Wild card
- LL = Lucky loser
- Alt = Alternate
- ITF = ITF entry
- PR = Protected ranking
- SR = Special ranking
- SE = Special exempt
- JE = Junior exempt
- JR = Junior Accelerator Programme entrant
- CO = College Accelerator Programme entrant
- NG = Next Gen Accelerator Program entrant
- w/o = Walkover
- r = Retired
- d = Defaulted

=== Finals ===
Semifinals
1	(United States) Brad Gilbert	6	6
(United States) Larry Stefanki	4	2
(Australia) Wally Masur	6	6
2	(India) Ramesh Krishnan	4	4

Final
1	(United States) Brad Gilbert	6	6
(Australia) Wally Masur	3	3

=== Top half ===
First round
1	(United States) B Gilbert	4	6	6
Q	(United States) J Gurfein	6	3	4
Q	(United States) D Gitlin	6	7
(United States) J Lapidus	3	6
Q	(United States) K Belcher	7	7
Q	(United States) T Cain	6	6
WC	(United States) P DuPré	7	4	3
7	(United States) M Davis	6	6	6
4	(United States) D Pate	5	6	3
(United States) L Stefanki	7	4	6
(United States) Ti Gullikson	6	6
(New Zealand) R Simpson	4	4
(United States) D Dowlen	2	4
(United States) R Seguso	6	6
(United States) K Flach	6	6	6
(United States) S McCain	7	4	4

Second round
1	(United States) B Gilbert	6	6
Q	(United States) D Gitlin	2	3
Q	(United States) K Belcher	6	5	4
7	(United States) M Davis	4	7	6
(United States) L Stefanki	6	6	6
(United States) Ti Gullikson	7	4	4
(United States) R Seguso	7	3	6
(United States) K Flach	6	6	4

Quarterfinals
1	(United States) B Gilbert	6	6
7	(United States) M Davis	3	3
(United States) L Stefanki	7	6
(United States) R Seguso	5	3

Semifinals
1	(United States) B Gilbert	6	6
(United States) L Stefanki	4	2

=== Bottom half ===
First round
5	(United States) T Moor	2	6	4
(United States) H Pfister	6	2	6
(United States) V Winitsky	1	6	3
(United States) T Giammalva	6	3	6
(United States) R Van't Hof	4	1
(Australia) W Masur	6	6
(United States) D Saltz	3	6
3	(United States) M Bauer	6	7
8	(United States) To Gullikson	4	7	6
(United States) M Freeman	6	6	7
(United States) L Bourne	6	7
(Nigeria) N Odizor	4	6
(United States) H Sands	4	2
(Canada) G Michibata	6	6
(Paraguay) F González	1	7	3
2	(India) R Krishnan	6	6	6

Second round
(United States) H Pfister	6	6
(United States) T Giammalva	4	3
(Australia) W Masur	7	6
3	(United States) M Bauer	5	2
(United States) M Freeman	4	3
(United States) L Bourne	6	6
(Canada) G Michibata	3	1
2	(India) R Krishnan	6	6

Quarterfinals
(United States) H Pfister	6	3	4
(Australia) W Masur	2	6	6
(United States) L Bourne	5	5
2	(India) R Krishnan	7	7

Semifinals
(Australia) W Masur	6	6
2	(India) R Krishnan	4	4
