= 1981 Taipei International Championships =

- Date: 9–15 November
- Edition: 5th
- Category: Grand Prix
- Draw: 32S / 16D
- Prize money: $75,000
- Surface: Carpet / indoor
- Location: Taipei, Taiwan

Champions

Singles
- (United States) Robert Van't Hof

Doubles
- (United States) Mike Bauer / (United States) John Benson
- Taipei Grand Prix

The 1981 Taipei International Championships was a men's tennis tournament played on indoor carpet courts in Taipei, Taiwan that was part of the 1981 Volvo Grand Prix. It was the fifth edition of the tournament and was held from 9 November through 15 November 1981. Unseeded Robert Van't Hof won the singles title.

== Finals ==
=== Singles ===
(United States) Robert Van't Hof defeated (United States) Pat DuPré 7–5, 6–2

- It was Van't Hof's first singles title of his career.

=== Doubles ===
(United States) Mike Bauer / (United States) John Benson defeated (United States) John Austin / (United States) Mike Cahill 6–4, 6–3
