= 1981 Taipei International Championships – Doubles =

Doubles
- 1981 Taipei International Championships

Final
- Champions: (United States) Mike Bauer (United States) John Benson
- Runners-up: (United States) John Austin (United States) Mike Cahill
- Score: 6–4, 6–3

Details
- Draw: 16
- Seeds: 4

Events
Singles	Doubles
- Pacific Cup International

Bruce Manson and Brian Teacher were the defending champions, but none competed this year.

Mike Bauer and John Benson won the title by defeating John Austin and Mike Cahill 6–4, 6–3 in the final.

== Seeds ==
1. (Australia) Mark Edmondson / (Australia) Kim Warwick (first round)
2. (Australia) Paul McNamee / (United States) Bill Scanlon (first round)
3. (United States) John Austin / (United States) Mike Cahill (final)
4. (United States) Chris Mayotte / (United States) Van Winitsky (first round)

== Draw ==
Key

- Q = Qualifier
- WC = Wild card
- LL = Lucky loser
- Alt = Alternate
- ITF = ITF entry
- PR = Protected ranking
- SR = Special ranking
- SE = Special exempt
- JE = Junior exempt
- JR = Junior Accelerator Programme entrant
- CO = College Accelerator Programme entrant
- NG = Next Gen Accelerator Program entrant
- w/o = Walkover
- r = Retired
- d = Defaulted

=== Draw ===
First round
1	(Australia) M Edmondson (Australia) K Warwick	3	6
(Australia) R Frawley (New Zealand) C Lewis	6	7
(United States) L Bourne (Australia) B Drewett	6	6
(United States) B Gilbert (India) R Krishnan	4	2
3	(United States) J Austin (United States) M Cahill	6	7
(United States) P DuPré (United States) M Estep	3	5
(United States) T Graham (Austria) H Kary	6	6
(United States) Nial Brash (Australia) A Gardiner	2	2
(United States) M Davis (United States) D Gitlin	7	2	7
(Austria) P Feigl (India) S Menon	6	6	5
(United States) J Delaney (United States) T Gullikson	6	6	7
4	(United States) C Mayotte (United States) V Winitsky	3	7	5
(United States) M Bauer (United States) J Benson	7	6
(Austria) R Reininger (Netherlands) L Sanders	5	2
(United States) D Dowlen (Nigeria) N Odizor	6	5	6
2	(Australia) P McNamee (United States) B Scanlon	4	7	4

Quarterfinals
(Australia) R Frawley (New Zealand) C Lewis	7	6
(United States) L Bourne (Australia) B Drewett	6	2
3	(United States) J Austin (United States) M Cahill	2	6	6
(United States) T Graham (Austria) H Kary	6	3	4
(United States) M Davis (United States) D Gitlin	6	6
(United States) J Delaney (United States) T Gullikson	3	2
(United States) M Bauer (United States) J Benson	2	6	6
(United States) D Dowlen (Nigeria) N Odizor	6	3	4

Semifinals
(Australia) R Frawley (New Zealand) C Lewis	1	3
3	(United States) J Austin (United States) M Cahill	6	6
(United States) M Davis (United States) D Gitlin	6	7	6
(United States) M Bauer (United States) J Benson	7	5	7

Final
3	(United States) J Austin (United States) M Cahill	4	3
(United States) M Bauer (United States) J Benson	6	6
