= 1980 Taipei International Championships =

- Date: 10–16 November
- Edition: 4th
- Category: Grand Prix
- Draw: 32S / 16D
- Prize money: $75,000
- Surface: Carpet / indoor
- Location: Taipei, Taiwan

Champions

Singles
- (Czechoslovakia) Ivan Lendl

Doubles
- (United States) Brian Teacher / (United States) Bruce Manson
← 1979 ·	Taipei Grand Prix	· 1981 →

The 1980 Taipei International Championships was a men's tennis tournament played on indoor carpet courts in Taipei, Taiwan that was part of the 1980 Volvo Grand Prix. It was the fourth edition of the tournament and was held from 10 November through 16 November 1980. First-seeded Ivan Lendl won the singles title.

== Finals ==
=== Singles ===
(Czechoslovakia) Ivan Lendl defeated (United States) Brian Teacher 6–7, 6–3, 6–3, 7–6

- It was Lendl's 7th singles title of the year and his career.

=== Doubles ===
(United States) Brian Teacher / (United States) Bruce Manson defeated (United States) John Austin / (United States) Ferdi Taygan 6–4, 6–0
