= 1983 Australian Open – Men's singles =

Men's singles
- 1983 Australian Open

Final
- Champion: (Sweden) Mats Wilander
- Runner-up: (Czechoslovakia) Ivan Lendl
- Score: 6–1, 6–4, 6–4

Details
- Draw: 96
- Seeds: 16

Events
Singles	men	women		boys	girls
Doubles	men	women	mixed	boys	girls
WC Singles	men	women	quad
WC Doubles	men	women	quad
Legends	men	women	mixed
- Australian Open

Mats Wilander defeated Ivan Lendl in the final, 6–1, 6–4, 6–4 to win the men's singles tennis title at the 1983 Australian Open. It was his first Australian Open title and second major singles title overall. At 19 years, 111 days, Wilander was the second youngest man to win multiple majors, only behind Björn Borg.

Johan Kriek was the two-time defending champion, but lost in the quarterfinals to Wilander.

== Seeds ==
The seeded players are listed below. Mats Wilander is the champion; others show the round in which they were eliminated.

1. (Czechoslovakia) Ivan Lendl (final)
2. (United States) John McEnroe (semifinals)
3. (Sweden) Mats Wilander (champion)
4. (United States) Eliot Teltscher (quarterfinals)
5. (United States) Johan Kriek (quarterfinals)
6. (United States) Vitas Gerulaitis (second round)
7. (Czechoslovakia) Tomáš Šmíd (quarterfinals)
8. (Sweden) Anders Järryd (fourth round)
9. (Sweden) Henrik Sundström (second round)
10. (United States) ~~Scott Davis~~ (withdrew)
11. (United States) Brian Teacher (third round)
12. (United States) Hank Pfister (second round)
13. (New Zealand) Chris Lewis (third round)
14. (United States) Steve Denton (third round)
15. (United States) Tim Mayotte (semifinals)
16. (Australia) Paul McNamee (fourth round)

== Draw ==
Key

- Q = Qualifier
- WC = Wild card
- LL = Lucky loser
- Alt = Alternate
- ITF = ITF entry
- PR = Protected ranking
- SR = Special ranking
- SE = Special exempt
- JE = Junior exempt
- JR = Junior Accelerator Programme entrant
- CO = College Accelerator Programme entrant
- NG = Next Gen Accelerator Program entrant
- w/o = Walkover
- r = Retired
- d = Defaulted

=== Final eight ===
Quarterfinals
1	(Czechoslovakia) Ivan Lendl	7	2	6	6
7	(Czechoslovakia) Tomáš Šmíd	6	6	1	2
4	(United States) Eliot Teltscher	4	2	6	6
15	(United States) Tim Mayotte	6	6	3	7
5	(United States) Johan Kriek	3	4	6
3	(Sweden) Mats Wilander	6	6	7
(Australia) Wally Masur	2	1	2
2	(United States) John McEnroe	6	6	6

Semifinals
1	(Czechoslovakia) Ivan Lendl	6	7	6
15	(United States) Tim Mayotte	1	6	3
3	(Sweden) Mats Wilander	4	6	6	6
2	(United States) John McEnroe	6	3	4	3

Final
1	(Czechoslovakia) Ivan Lendl	1	4	4
3	(Sweden) Mats Wilander	6	6	6

=== Section 1 ===
First round
(Australia) CA Miller	6	6	6	4
(United States) P Fleming	7	7	4	6
(Australia) D Macpherson	6	1	7	1	10
(United States) F Buehning	3	6	6	6	12
(India) V Amritraj	5	2	4
(Australia) M Kratzmann	7	6	6
Q	(Australia) W Hampson	5	3	3
(Australia) P Cash	7	6	6

Second round
1	(Czechoslovakia) I Lendl	6	6	6
Q	(United Kingdom) J Smith	2	2	4
(United States) P Fleming	6	6	6
(United States) F Buehning	1	2	3
(Australia) M Kratzmann	2	2	7	4
(Australia) P Cash	6	6	6	6
LL	(New Zealand) B Derlin	1	6	4	3
11	(United States) B Teacher	6	3	6	6

Third round
1	(Czechoslovakia) I Lendl	6	7	6	6
(United States) P Fleming	7	6	3	4
(Australia) P Cash	6	7	6	2	7
11	(United States) B Teacher	4	6	7	6	5

Fourth round
1	(Czechoslovakia) I Lendl	7	6	6
(Australia) P Cash	6	3	3

=== Section 2 ===
First round
(United States) C Hooper	6	6	6
(Sweden) H Simonsson	3	2	3
Q	(Australia) G Whitecross	2	4	3
(Australia) J Fitzgerald	6	6	6
(United States) J Borowiak	6	3	6	7
(Austria) P Feigl	3	6	3	5
(United States) J Gurfein	7	7	2	4	6
LL	(Netherlands) H van Boeckel	6	6	6	6	3

Second round
13	(New Zealand) C Lewis	6	7	6	6	6
(United States) C Hooper	7	5	7	3	4
(Australia) J Fitzgerald	6	6	6
(Australia) P Dent	3	3	3
(United States) J Borowiak	6	2	7	6
(Sweden) S Edberg	3	6	5	4
(United States) J Gurfein	4	6	7	1
7	(Czechoslovakia) T Šmid	6	7	6	6

Third round
13	(New Zealand) C Lewis	3	6	1
(Australia) J Fitzgerald	6	7	6
(United States) J Borowiak	4	6	1	4
7	(Czechoslovakia) T Šmid	6	3	6	6

Fourth round
(Australia) J Fitzgerald	5	6	4	2
7	(Czechoslovakia) T Šmid	7	3	6	6

=== Section 3 ===
First round
(United States) G Holmes	7	4	6	2	2
(United States) T Gullikson	6	6	4	6	6
(United States) L Bourne	7	3	6	1	4
(Australia) J Alexander	5	6	3	6	6
(France) L Courteau	3	0	2
(United States) R Meyer	6	6	6
(United States) M Leach	6	7	6	6	6
(United States) L Stefanki	4	6	7	7	3

Second round
4	(United States) E Teltscher	6	7	6	6
(Australia) B Dyke	4	6	7	1
(United States) T Gullikson	6	6	7
(Australia) J Alexander	1	3	6
(United States) M Davis	3	6	6	4	3
(United States) R Meyer	6	4	0	6	6
(United States) M Leach	6	3	7	4	10
9	(Sweden) H Sundstrom	2	6	5	6	8

Third round
4	(United States) E Teltscher	6	6	3	6	6
(United States) T Gullikson	7	4	6	4	3
(United States) R Meyer	6	7	6
(United States) M Leach	4	6	4

Fourth round
4	(United States) E Teltscher	6	7	6
(United States) R Meyer	4	6	4

=== Section 4 ===
First round
(United States) S Giammalva, Jr.	6	7	2	6
(New Zealand) D Mustard	2	6	6	3
Q	(United States) CB Strode	3	5	6	5
(Australia) M Edmondson	6	7	4	7
(West Germany) R Gehring	3	2	4
(Sweden) J Nyström	6	6	6
(Australia) R Frawley	7	7	6
Q	(Australia) P Doohan	6	5	3

Second round
15	(United States) T Mayotte	7	6	6
(United States) S Giammalva, Jr.	5	3	4
(Australia) M Edmondson	6	6	7
Q	(United States) D Pate	1	4	5
(Sweden) J Nyström	3	6	7	6
(Australia) R Frawley	6	2	5	3
(Hungary) Z Kuharszky	6	6	6
6	(United States) V Gerulaitis	1	3	3

Third round
15	(United States) T Mayotte	6	3	6	6
(Australia) M Edmondson	4	6	3	2
(Sweden) J Nyström	6	6	6
(Hungary) Z Kuharszky	4	4	2

Fourth round
15	(United States) T Mayotte	6	6	6
(Sweden) J Nyström	4	4	4

=== Section 5 ===
First round
(Australia) J Frawley	4	7	6	4	4
(Australia) J McCurdy	6	6	2	6	6
(United States) A Andrews	6	6	7
(United States) M Mitchell	4	4	6
LL	(Brazil) E Oncins	0	3	3
(United Kingdom) J Lloyd	6	6	6
(United States) P Du Pré	3	7	2	6	9
(United States) B Gilbert	6	5	6	3	7

Second round
5	(United States) J Kriek	6	7	6
(United States) MS Strode	2	5	2
(Australia) J McCurdy	4	7	5	6
(United States) A Andrews	6	6	7	7
(United Kingdom) J Lloyd	6	4	5	7	6
Q	(United States) R Seguso	3	6	7	6	4
(United States) P Du Pré	6	2	3	4
14	(United States) S Denton	4	6	6	6

Third round
5	(United States) J Kriek	6	6	6
(United States) A Andrews	0	4	2
(United Kingdom) J Lloyd	7	6	6
14	(United States) S Denton	6	2	3

Fourth round
5	(United States) J Kriek	6	6	7
(United Kingdom) J Lloyd	3	3	6

=== Section 6 ===
First round
(Australia) C Johnstone	4	6	6	7	13
(United States) M De Palmer	6	7	0	6	11
(Brazil) M Hocevar	6	3	6	7	6
(New Zealand) R Simpson	1	6	7	5	1
(United States) R Tanner	7	6	3	6
(Australia) K Warwick	6	2	6	3
(United States) M Bauer	7	6	6	6
(Australia) C Fancutt	6	4	7	1

Second round
16	(Australia) P McNamee	4	7	3	6	6
(Australia) C Johnstone	6	6	6	3	2
(Nigeria) N Odizor	6	2	2	6	4
(Brazil) M Hocevar	3	6	6	2	6
(United States) R Tanner	7	3	4	6	14
(United States) M Bauer	6	6	6	3	12
(United States) B Testerman	4	6	7	3	2
3	(Sweden) M Wilander	6	4	6	6	6

Third round
16	(Australia) P McNamee	4	7	7	4	6
(Brazil) M Hocevar	6	6	6	6	3
(United States) R Tanner	4	7	3	1
3	(Sweden) M Wilander	6	6	6	6

Fourth round
16	(Australia) P McNamee	4	2	6
3	(Sweden) M Wilander	6	6	7

=== Section 7 ===
First round
Q	(United States) J Austin	6	1	4
(Australia) B Drewett	7	6	6
Q	(United States) M Anger	7	6	6
(Czechoslovakia) M Mečíř	5	3	1
(Australia) S Youl	6	4	6	6
(United States) J Lapidus	2	6	4	3
(Australia) W Masur	6	6	6
Q	(United States) E Sherbeck	2	4	2

Second round
8	(Sweden) A Järryd	6	7	6
(Australia) B Drewett	4	6	2
(United States) M Dickson	4	4	6	4
Q	(United States) M Anger	6	6	3	6
(Australia) S Youl	4	6	6
(Australia) W Masur	6	7	7
(United States) J Sadri	3	5	4
LL	(United States) K Flach	6	7	6

Third round
8	(Sweden) A Järryd	6	2	6	6
Q	(United States) M Anger	3	6	2	1
(Australia) W Masur	6	7	7
LL	(United States) K Flach	1	6	6

Fourth round
8	(Sweden) A Järryd	3	3	6	1
(Australia) W Masur	6	6	4	6

=== Section 8 ===
First round
(United States) E Korita	4	3	4
(United States) T Gullikson	6	6	6
(United States) D Dowlen	4	4	6	6	3
Q	(Australia) W Maher	6	6	3	1	6
(United States) D Gitlin	4	6	7	6
LL	(France) T Benhabiles	6	0	6	2
(United States) T Giammalva	3	6	6	6
(United States) L Shiras	6	3	2	4

Second round
12	(United States) H Pfister	1	7	6	1
(United States) M Freeman	6	6	7	6
(United States) T Gullikson	6	7	7
Q	(Australia) W Maher	4	6	6
(United States) D Gitlin	2	7	4	6	1
(India) R Krishnan	6	6	6	3	6
(United States) T Giammalva	3	6	3	3
2	(United States) J McEnroe	6	1	6	6

Third round
(United States) M Freeman	7	2	4	6
(United States) T Gullikson	6	6	6	7
(India) R Krishnan	4	5	1
2	(United States) J McEnroe	6	7	6

Fourth round
(United States) T Gullikson	3	2	2
2	(United States) J McEnroe	6	6	6

Preceded by 1983 US Open	Grand Slam men's singles	Succeeded by 1984 French Open
