= 1984 Taipei International Championships – Doubles =

Doubles
- 1984 Taipei International Championships

Final
- Champions: (United States) Ken Flach (United States) Robert Seguso
- Runners-up: (United States) Drew Gitlin (United States) Hank Pfister
- Score: 6–1, 6–7, 6–2

Details
- Draw: 16
- Seeds: 4

Events
Singles	Doubles
- Pacific Cup International

Kim Warwick and Wally Masur were the defending champions, but Warwick did not compete this year. Masur teamed up with Tim Gullikson and lost in the first round to Terry Moor and Erik Van't Hof.

Ken Flach and Robert Seguso won the title by defeating Drew Gitlin and Hank Pfister 6–1, 6–7, 6–2 in the final.

== Seeds ==
1. (United States) Ken Flach / (United States) Robert Seguso (champions)
2. (United States) Tim Gullikson / (Australia) Wally Masur (first round)
3. (United States) David Dowlen / (Nigeria) Nduka Odizor (semifinals)
4. (United States) Tony Giammalva / (Paraguay) Francisco González (first round)

== Draw ==
Key

- Q = Qualifier
- WC = Wild card
- LL = Lucky loser
- Alt = Alternate
- ITF = ITF entry
- PR = Protected ranking
- SR = Special ranking
- SE = Special exempt
- JE = Junior exempt
- JR = Junior Accelerator Programme entrant
- CO = College Accelerator Programme entrant
- NG = Next Gen Accelerator Program entrant
- w/o = Walkover
- r = Retired
- d = Defaulted

=== Draw ===
First round
1	(United States) K Flach (United States) R Seguso	7	6
(Netherlands) H van Boeckel (United States) M Wooldridge	6	2
(United States) J Gurfein (Canada) G Michibata	3	6	4
(India) S Menon (New Zealand) R Simpson	6	2	6
3	(United States) D Dowlen (Nigeria) N Odizor	7	7
(United States) B Gilbert (United States) J Lapidus	5	5
(United States) L Stefanki (United States) R Van't Hof	4	6	6
(United States) D Saltz (United States) H Sands	6	4	3
(United States) K Belcher (United States) Michael Fedderly Jr.	3	3
(United States) T Cain (United States) S McCain	6	6
(United States) M Anger (India) R Krishnan	6	7
4	(United States) T Giammalva (Paraguay) F González	2	5
(United States) D Pate (West Germany) K Richter	6	3	6
(United States) D Gitlin (United States) H Pfister	2	6	7
(United States) T Moor (United States) E Van't Hof	6	7
2	(United States) Ti Gullikson (Australia) W Masur	3	6

Quarterfinals
1	(United States) K Flach (United States) R Seguso	4	7	6
(India) S Menon (New Zealand) R Simpson	6	6	3
3	(United States) D Dowlen (Nigeria) N Odizor	7	5	7
(United States) L Stefanki (United States) R Van't Hof	6	7	6
(United States) T Cain (United States) S McCain	6	7	6
(United States) M Anger (India) R Krishnan	7	5	7
(United States) D Gitlin (United States) H Pfister	4	6	7
(United States) T Moor (United States) E Van't Hof	6	4	5

Semifinals
1	(United States) K Flach (United States) R Seguso	6	6
3	(United States) D Dowlen (Nigeria) N Odizor	3	4
(United States) M Anger (India) R Krishnan	6	1	6
(United States) D Gitlin (United States) H Pfister	3	6	7

Final
1	(United States) K Flach (United States) R Seguso	6	6	6
(United States) D Gitlin (United States) H Pfister	1	7	2
