= 1993 Tel Aviv Open – Singles =

Singles
- 1993 Tel Aviv Open

Final
- Champion: (Italy) Stefano Pescosolido
- Runner-up: (Israel) Amos Mansdorf
- Score: 7–6^{(7–5)}, 7–5

Events
Singles	Doubles
← 1992 ·	Tel Aviv Open	· 1994 →

Jeff Tarango was the defending champion, but lost in the first round this year.

Stefano Pescosolido won the tournament, beating Amos Mansdorf in the final, 7–6^{(7–5)}, 7–5.

== Seeds ==
1. (Austria) Thomas Muster (semifinals)
2. (Israel) Amos Mansdorf (final)
3. (United States) Brad Gilbert (first round)
4. (Spain) Javier Sánchez (quarterfinals)
5. (Russia) Andrei Cherkasov (semifinals)
6. (United States) David Wheaton (second round)
7. (Spain) Alberto Berasategui (first round)
8. (Spain) Emilio Sánchez (second round)

== Draw ==
=== Key ===
- Q = Qualifier
- WC = Wild card
- LL = Lucky loser
- Alt = Alternate
- SE = Special exempt
- PR = Protected ranking
- ITF = ITF entry
- JE = Junior exempt
- w/o = Walkover
- r = Retired
- d = Defaulted
- SR = Special ranking

=== Finals ===
Semifinals
1	(Austria) Thomas Muster	6^{3}	6	6^{4}
(Italy) Stefano Pescosolido	7^{7}	1	7^{7}
5	(Russia) Andrei Cherkasov	3	0
2	(Israel) Amos Mansdorf	6	6

Final
(Italy) Stefano Pescosolido	7^{7}	7
2	(Israel) Amos Mansdorf	6^{5}	5

=== Top half ===
First round
1	(Austria) T Muster	6	6
WC	(Israel) N Behr	3	2
Q	(United States) D Johnson	2	6	6
(Spain) J Arrese	6	3	4
(Israel) G Bloom	6	6
(France) S Simian	4	4
WC	(Israel) E Erlich	6	6
7	(Spain) A Berasategui	2	4
4	(Spain) J Sánchez	6	4	6
Q	(South Africa) J de Beer	3	6	2
(France) R Gilbert	6^{4}	1^{r}
Q	(Israel) O Sela	7^{7}	4
(Italy) S Pescosolido	6	6
(Bulgaria) M Velev	0	3
(United States) J Tarango	2	6	4
6	(United States) D Wheaton	6	4	6

Second round
1	(Austria) T Muster	7	7
Q	(United States) D Johnson	5	5
(Israel) G Bloom	5	7	6
WC	(Israel) E Erlich	7	5	3
4	(Spain) J Sánchez	6	4	6
Q	(Israel) O Sela	2	6	1
(Italy) S Pescosolido	6	4	6
6	(United States) D Wheaton	4	6	4

Quarterfinals
1	(Austria) T Muster	7^{7}	7
(Israel) G Bloom	6^{5}	5
4	(Spain) J Sánchez	5	6	0
(Italy) S Pescosolido	7	2	6

Semifinals
1	(Austria) T Muster	6^{3}	6	6^{4}
(Italy) S Pescosolido	7^{7}	1	7^{7}

=== Bottom half ===
First round
5	(Russia) A Cherkasov	6	7
(Spain) MA Gorriz	2	5
(Germany) C Arriens	7^{7}	6
Q	(Germany) C Saceanu	6^{5}	4
WC	(Israel) E Ran	6	6
(Czech Republic) D Rikl	3	1
(Italy) A Gaudenzi	6	6
3	(United States) B Gilbert	4	3
8	(Spain) E Sánchez	6^{6}	7^{7}	5
(Italy) D Nargiso	7^{8}	6^{3}	3^{r}
(South Africa) G Stafford	6	6
(Argentina) G Markus	2	1
(United States) B Shelton	2	6	3
(France) F Santoro	6	4	6
(Czech Republic) D Vacek	6^{4}	3
2	(Israel) A Mansdorf	7^{7}	6

Second round
5	(Russia) A Cherkasov	2	7	6
(Germany) C Arriens	6	5	3
WC	(Israel) E Ran	5	2
(Italy) A Gaudenzi	7	6
8	(Spain) E Sánchez	6^{3}	1
(South Africa) G Stafford	7^{7}	6
(France) F Santoro	2	2
2	(Israel) A Mansdorf	6	6

Quarterfinals
5	(Russia) A Cherkasov	6^{6}	7^{7}	7
(Italy) A Gaudenzi	7^{8}	6^{2}	5
(South Africa) G Stafford
2	(Israel) A Mansdorf	w/o

Semifinals
5	(Russia) A Cherkasov	3	0
2	(Israel) A Mansdorf	6	6
