= 1981 Taipei International Championships – Singles =

Singles
- 1981 Taipei International Championships

Final
- Champion: (United States) Robert Van't Hof
- Runner-up: (United States) Pat DuPré
- Score: 7–5, 6–2

Details
- Draw: 32 (4Q)
- Seeds: 8

Events
Singles	Doubles
- Pacific Cup International

Ivan Lendl was the defending champion, but did not compete this year.

Robert Van't Hof won the title by defeating Pat DuPré 7–5, 6–2 in the final.

== Seeds ==
1. (Australia) Kim Warwick (first round)
2. (United States) John Sadri (first round)
3. (Australia) Paul McNamee (semifinals)
4. (Australia) Mark Edmondson (semifinals)
5. (United States) Bill Scanlon (second round)
6. (New Zealand) Chris Lewis (second round)
7. (United States) John Austin (first round)
8. (United States) Tim Gullikson (quarterfinals)

== Draw ==
Key

- Q = Qualifier
- WC = Wild card
- LL = Lucky loser
- Alt = Alternate
- ITF = ITF entry
- PR = Protected ranking
- SR = Special ranking
- SE = Special exempt
- JE = Junior exempt
- JR = Junior Accelerator Programme entrant
- CO = College Accelerator Programme entrant
- NG = Next Gen Accelerator Program entrant
- w/o = Walkover
- r = Retired
- d = Defaulted

=== Finals ===
Semifinals
(United States) Pat DuPré	6	3	6
4	(Australia) Mark Edmondson	3	6	4
3	(Australia) Paul McNamee	4	0
(United States) Robert Van't Hof	6	6

Final
(United States) Pat DuPré	5	2
(United States) Robert Van't Hof	7	6

=== Top half ===
First round
1	(Australia) K Warwick	0	6
(United States) P DuPré	6	7
(Australia) B Drewett	3	2
(United States) C Dunk	6	6
Q	(Australia) H Hansson	3	1
Q	(Switzerland) I Dupasquier	6	6
(Chinese Taipei) Wu Chang-rung	2	3
6	(New Zealand) C Lewis	6	6
4	(Australia) M Edmondson	6	6
(United States) T Graham	1	4
Q	(United States) B Gilbert	6	7
(United States) L Bourne	4	6
(United States) L Stefanki	7	7
(Austria) H Kary	5	6
(India) R Krishnan	6	6	3
8	(United States) T Gullikson	7	3	6

Second round
(United States) P DuPré	6	6
(United States) C Dunk	2	4
Q	(Switzerland) I Dupasquier	7	6
6	(New Zealand) C Lewis	6	4
4	(Australia) M Edmondson	2	6	6
Q	(United States) B Gilbert	6	4	3
(United States) L Stefanki	4	0
8	(United States) T Gullikson	6	6

Quarterfinals
(United States) P DuPré	7	6
Q	(Switzerland) I Dupasquier	6	3
4	(Australia) M Edmondson	6	3	6
8	(United States) T Gullikson	3	6	4

Semifinals
(United States) P DuPré	6	3	6
4	(Australia) M Edmondson	3	6	4

=== Bottom half ===
First round
5	(United States) B Scanlon	6	6	6
(United States) C Mayotte	7	3	2
(Netherlands) L Sanders	7	3	5
(United States) M Estep	6	6	7
(United States) M Cahill	6	6	6
(India) S Menon	4	7	2
(United States) J Delaney	2	0
3	(Australia) P McNamee	6	6
7	(United States) J Austin	4	2
(United States) R Van't Hof	6	6
(Austria) P Feigl	3	6	2
(United States) M Davis	6	3	6
(Australia) R Frawley	6	6
Q	(United States) C Stansbury	3	4
(United States) V Winitsky	6	2	6
2	(United States) J Sadri	4	6	1

Second round
5	(United States) B Scanlon	3	2
(United States) M Estep	6	6
(United States) M Cahill	2	4
3	(Australia) P McNamee	6	6
(United States) R Van't Hof	4	6	7
(United States) M Davis	6	2	6
(Australia) R Frawley	5	6	6
(United States) V Winitsky	7	4	4

Quarterfinals
(United States) M Estep	0	3
3	(Australia) P McNamee	6	6
(United States) R Van't Hof	4	6	7
(Australia) R Frawley	6	3	5

Semifinals
3	(Australia) P McNamee	4	0
(United States) R Van't Hof	6	6
