= 1982 Taipei International Championships =

- Date: 8–14 November
- Edition: 6th
- Category: Grand Prix
- Draw: 32S / 16D
- Prize money: $75,000
- Surface: Carpet / indoor
- Location: Taipei, Taiwan

Champions

Singles
- (United States) Brad Gilbert

Doubles
- (United States) Robert Van't Hof / (United States) Larry Stefanki
← 1981 ·	Taipei Grand Prix	· 1983 →

The 1982 Taipei International Championships was a men's tennis tournament played on indoor carpet courts in Taipei, Taiwan that was part of the 1982 Volvo Grand Prix. It was the sixth edition of the tournament and was held from 8 November through 14 November 1982. Unseeded Brad Gilbert won the singles title.

== Finals ==
=== Singles ===
(United States) Brad Gilbert defeated (United States) Craig Wittus 6–1, 6–4

- It was Gilbert's first singles title of his career.

=== Doubles ===
(United States) Larry Stefanki / (United States) Robert Van't Hof defeated (United States) Fred McNair / (United States) Tim Wilkison 6–3, 7–6
