= 1994 Tel Aviv Open – Doubles =

Doubles
- 1994 Tel Aviv Open

Final
- Champions: (South Africa) Lan Bale (South Africa) John-Laffnie de Jager
- Runners-up: (Sweden) Jan Apell (Sweden) Jonas Björkman
- Score: 6–7, 6–2, 7–6

Events
Singles	Doubles
← 1993 ·	Tel Aviv Open	· 1995 →

Sergio Casal and Emilio Sánchez were the defending champions, but did not participate this year.

Lan Bale and John-Laffnie de Jager won the title, defeating Jan Apell and Jonas Björkman 6–7, 6–2, 7–6 in the final.

== Seeds ==
1. (Sweden) Jan Apell / (Sweden) Jonas Björkman (final)
2. (South Africa) Lan Bale / (South Africa) John-Laffnie de Jager (champions)
3. (United Kingdom) Neil Broad / (United States) Greg Van Emburgh (quarterfinals)
4. (Argentina) Luis Lobo / (Spain) Javier Sánchez (semifinals)

== Draw ==
=== Key ===
- Q = Qualifier
- WC = Wild card
- LL = Lucky loser
- Alt = Alternate
- SE = Special exempt
- PR = Protected ranking
- ITF = ITF entry
- JE = Junior exempt
- w/o = Walkover
- r = Retired
- d = Defaulted
- SR = Special ranking

=== Draw ===
First round
1	(Sweden) J Apell (Sweden) J Björkman	6	6
(Australia) W Arthurs (Australia) J Ireland	1	2
(Spain) JA Conde (Spain) F Roig	2	7	6
(Netherlands) T Kempers (United States) J Waite	6	5	4
4	(Argentina) L Lobo (Spain) J Sánchez	7	7
(United States) M Keil (United States) D Johnson	6	5
Q	(United States) V Spadea (New Zealand) G Wilson	4	4
(Latvia) Ģ Dzelde (Russia) Y Kafelnikov	6	6
WC	(Israel) E Erlich (Israel) E Ran	3	3
(South Africa) M Barnard (South Africa) B Haygarth	6	6
WC	(Israel) G Bloom (Germany) C Saceanu	3	6	3
3	(United Kingdom) N Broad (United States) G Van Emburgh	6	3	6
(United States) B Shelton (Netherlands) F Wibier	6	6
(South Africa) K Haygarth (South Africa) M Ondruska	7	7
WC	(Israel) N Behr (Israel) O Sela	2	2
2	(South Africa) L Bale (South Africa) J-L de Jager	6	6

Quarterfinals
1	(Sweden) J Apell (Sweden) J Björkman	6	6
(Spain) JA Conde (Spain) F Roig	3	0
4	(Argentina) L Lobo (Spain) J Sánchez	6	7
(Latvia) Ģ Dzelde (Russia) Y Kafelnikov	4	6
(South Africa) M Barnard (South Africa) B Haygarth	6	5	6
3	(United Kingdom) N Broad (United States) G Van Emburgh	4	7	4
(South Africa) K Haygarth (South Africa) M Ondruska	6	3
2	(South Africa) L Bale (South Africa) J-L de Jager	7	6

Semifinals
1	(Sweden) J Apell (Sweden) J Björkman	6	6
4	(Argentina) L Lobo (Spain) J Sánchez	4	2
(South Africa) M Barnard (South Africa) B Haygarth	6	7	1
2	(South Africa) L Bale (South Africa) J-L de Jager	7	5	6

Final
1	(Sweden) J Apell (Sweden) J Björkman	7	2	6
2	(South Africa) L Bale (South Africa) J-L de Jager	6	6	7
