= 1992 Tel Aviv Open – Doubles =

Doubles
- 1992 Tel Aviv Open

Final
- Champions: (United States) Mike Bauer (Portugal) João Cunha Silva
- Runners-up: (Netherlands) Mark Koevermans (Sweden) Tobias Svantesson
- Score: 6–3, 6–4

Details
- Draw: 16
- Seeds: 4

Events
Singles	Doubles
← 1991 ·	Tel Aviv Open	· 1993 →

David Rikl and Michiel Schapers were the defending champions, but Schapers did not participate this year. Rikl partnered Vicente Solves, losing in the first round.

Mike Bauer and João Cunha Silva won the title, defeating Mark Koevermans and Tobias Svantesson 6–3, 6–4 in the final.

== Seeds ==
1. (Netherlands) Mark Koevermans / (Sweden) Tobias Svantesson (final)
2. (Sweden) Johan Donar / (Sweden) Ola Jonsson (first round)
3. (Sweden) Rikard Bergh / (United States) Richard Matuszewski (semifinals)
4. (United States) Brad Gilbert / (Netherlands) Tom Kempers (first round)

== Draw ==
=== Key ===
- Q = Qualifier
- WC = Wild card
- LL = Lucky loser
- Alt = Alternate
- SE = Special exempt
- PR = Protected ranking
- ITF = ITF entry
- JE = Junior exempt
- w/o = Walkover
- r = Retired
- d = Defaulted
- SR = Special ranking

=== Draw ===
First round
1	(Netherlands) M Koevermans (Sweden) T Svantesson	6	6
(Czechoslovakia) D Rikl (Spain) V Solves	2	3
LL	(Israel) O Motevassel (Israel) O Sela	4	6	6
(Sweden) D Engel (Sweden) L Jonsson	6	2	1
3	(Sweden) R Bergh (United States) R Matuszewski	7	2	6
(South Africa) J-L de Jager (South Africa) M Ondruska	6	6	4
(Spain) À Corretja (Spain) MA Gorriz	3	7	6
(Belgium) X Daufresne (France) S Simian	6	6	7
(Uruguay) D Pérez (Italy) G Pozzi	5	5
(United States) B Devening (United States) M Jensen	7	7
WC	(Israel) M Daniel (Israel) S Perkiss	6	4	6
4	(United States) B Gilbert (Netherlands) T Kempers	4	6	4
(United States) M Bauer (Portugal) J Cunha Silva	6	6
(Georgia (country)) V Gabrichidze (New Zealand) S Guy	3	1
Q	(Sweden) J Carlsson (United States) J Tarango	5	7	7
2	(Sweden) J Donar (Sweden) O Jonsson	7	5	5

Quarterfinals
1	(Netherlands) M Koevermans (Sweden) T Svantesson	7	6
LL	(Israel) O Motevassel (Israel) O Sela	5	3
3	(Sweden) R Bergh (United States) R Matuszewski	6	6	6
(Belgium) X Daufresne (France) S Simian	1	7	2
(United States) B Devening (United States) M Jensen	7	6
WC	(Israel) M Daniel (Israel) S Perkiss	6	3
(United States) M Bauer (Portugal) J Cunha Silva	6	6
Q	(Sweden) J Carlsson (United States) J Tarango	4	4

Semifinals
1	(Netherlands) M Koevermans (Sweden) T Svantesson	6	6
3	(Sweden) R Bergh (United States) R Matuszewski	4	2
(United States) B Devening (United States) M Jensen	3	2
(United States) M Bauer (Portugal) J Cunha Silva	6	6

Final
1	(Netherlands) M Koevermans (Sweden) T Svantesson	3	4
(United States) M Bauer (Portugal) J Cunha Silva	6	6
