= 1993 Tel Aviv Open – Doubles =

Doubles
- 1993 Tel Aviv Open

Final
- Champions: (Spain) Sergio Casal (Spain) Emilio Sánchez
- Runners-up: (United States) Mike Bauer (Czech Republic) David Rikl
- Score: 6–4, 6–4

Events
Singles	Doubles
← 1992 ·	Tel Aviv Open	· 1994 →

Mike Bauer and João Cunha Silva were the defending champions, but Cunha Silva did not participate this year. Bauer partnered David Rikl, losing in the final.

Sergio Casal and Emilio Sánchez won the title, defeating Bauer and Rikl 6–4, 6–4 in the final.

== Seeds ==
1. (Spain) Sergio Casal / (Spain) Emilio Sánchez (champions)
2. (Italy) Diego Nargiso / (Spain) Javier Sánchez (quarterfinals)
3. (United States) Bret Garnett / (United States) T.J. Middleton (quarterfinals)
4. (United States) Kent Kinnear / (United States) David Wheaton (semifinals)

== Draw ==
=== Key ===
- Q = Qualifier
- WC = Wild card
- LL = Lucky loser
- Alt = Alternate
- SE = Special exempt
- PR = Protected ranking
- ITF = ITF entry
- JE = Junior exempt
- w/o = Walkover
- r = Retired
- d = Defaulted
- SR = Special ranking

=== Draw ===
First round
1	(Spain) S Casal (Spain) E Sánchez	6	7
(Australia) J Ireland (United States) J Yancey	2	5
WC	(Israel) E Ran (Israel) O Sela	7	3	1
(Israel) G Bloom (Germany) C Saceanu	6	6	6
3	(United States) B Garnett (United States) TJ Middleton	7	6
(South Africa) R Deppe (United States) J Sullivan	5	3
(South Africa) E Ferreira (South Africa) G Stafford
Q	(United Kingdom) A Foster (Italy) S Pescosolido	w/o
(Netherlands) M Schapers (Czech Republic) D Vacek	5	6	7
(South Africa) J de Beer (United States) D Johnson	7	4	6
(United States) D Eisenman (United States) T Mercer	7	4	6
4	(United States) K Kinnear (United States) D Wheaton	5	6	7
(United States) M Bauer (Czech Republic) D Rikl	7	3	6
(United States) R Benson (Denmark) M Mortensen	6	6	4
WC	(United States) B Gilbert (Israel) A Mansdorf	6	1
2	(Italy) D Nargiso (Spain) J Sánchez	7	6

Quarterfinals
1	(Spain) S Casal (Spain) E Sánchez	7	6
(Israel) G Bloom (Germany) C Saceanu	6	3
3	(United States) B Garnett (United States) TJ Middleton	5	6
Q	(United Kingdom) A Foster (Italy) S Pescosolido	7	7
(Netherlands) M Schapers (Czech Republic) D Vacek	4	6
4	(United States) K Kinnear (United States) D Wheaton	6	7
(United States) M Bauer (Czech Republic) D Rikl	7	6
2	(Italy) D Nargiso (Spain) J Sánchez	6	4

Semifinals
1	(Spain) S Casal (Spain) E Sánchez	6	6
Q	(United Kingdom) A Foster (Italy) S Pescosolido	3	2
4	(United States) K Kinnear (United States) D Wheaton	3	4
(United States) M Bauer (Czech Republic) D Rikl	6	6

Final
1	(Spain) S Casal (Spain) E Sánchez	6	6
(United States) M Bauer (Czech Republic) D Rikl	4	4
