= 1993 Tel Aviv Open =

- Date: October 11–18
- Edition: 14th
- Category: World Series
- Draw: 32S / 16D
- Prize money: $175,000
- Surface: Hard / outdoor
- Location: Ramat HaSharon, Tel Aviv District, Israel
- Venue: Israel Tennis Centers

Champions

Singles
- (Italy) Stefano Pescosolido

Doubles
- (Spain) Sergio Casal / (Spain) Emilio Sánchez
← 1992 ·	Tel Aviv Open	· 1994 →

The 1993 Tel Aviv Open was a men's tennis tournament played on outdoor hard courts that was part of the World Series of the 1993 ATP Tour. It was played at the Israel Tennis Centers in the Tel Aviv District city of Ramat HaSharon, Israel from October 11 through October 18, 1993. Unseeded Stefano Pescosolido won the singles title.

== Finals ==
=== Singles ===
(Italy) Stefano Pescosolido defeated (Israel) Amos Mansdorf 7–6^{(7–5)}, 7–5

- It was Pescosolido's only title of the year and the 2nd of his career.

=== Doubles ===
(Spain) Sergio Casal / (Spain) Emilio Sánchez defeated (United States) Mike Bauer / (Czech Republic) David Rikl 6–4, 6–4

- It was Casal's 3rd title of the year and the 43rd of his career. It was Sánchez's 3rd title of the year and the 60th of his career.
