= Mark Turpin (tennis) =

American tennis player (1957–2021)

- Full name: Mark Russell Turpin
- Country (sports): United States
- Born: February 4, 1957 Clinton, Oklahoma, U.S.
- Died: August 6, 2021 (aged 64)
- Height: 6 ft 0 in (183 cm)
- Plays: Right-handed

Singles
- Career record: 1–11
- Highest ranking: No. 211 (Dec 26, 1979)

Grand Slam singles results
- US Open: 1R (1978)

Mark Russell Turpin (February 4, 1957 – August 6, 2021) was an American professional tennis player.

Turpin, born in Clinton, Oklahoma, was the middle son of Texas Tennis Hall of Fame inductee Jack Turpin and a brother of professional tennis player Jeff Turpin. Raised in Dallas, Turpin was a main draw qualifier for the 1978 US Open and played collegiate tennis for Southern Methodist University, earning All-American honors as a senior in 1979. He competed briefly in professional tennis and had a best singles world ranking of 211.

== Grand Prix career finals ==
=== Doubles: 2 (0–2) ===
Result	W/L	Date	Tournament	Surface	Partner	Opponents	Score
Loss	0–1	Nov 1979	Hong Kong Open	Hard	(United States) Steve Denton	(United States) Pat DuPré (United States) Bob Lutz	3–6, 4–6
Loss	0–2	Jan 1980	San Juan Open	Hard	(South Africa) Robert Trogolo	(Australia) Paul McNamee (Australia) Paul Kronk	6–7, 3–6

== ATP Challenger finals ==
=== Doubles: 1 (0–1) ===
Result	Date	Tournament	Surface	Partner	Opponents	Score
Loss	Dec 1979	Austin, U.S.	Hard	(United States) Steve Denton	(India) Anand Amritraj (United States) John Austin	1–6, 2–6

== Personal life ==
Turpin spent his life post tennis in New Braunfels, Texas. He had four children with wife Kathleen and died in 2021, at the age of 64.
