= 1977 Taipei Summit Open =

- Date: 21–26 November
- Edition: 1st
- Category: Grand Prix (One star)
- Draw: 32S / 16D
- Prize money: $50,000
- Surface: Carpet / indoor
- Location: Taipei, Taiwan

Champions

Singles
- (United States) Tim Gullikson

Doubles
- (United States) Chris Delaney / (United States) Pat DuPré
- Taipei Grand Prix

The 1977 Taipei Summit Open was a men's tennis tournament played on indoor carpet courts in Taipei, Taiwan, that was part of the 1977 Colgate-Palmolive Grand Prix. It was the inaugural edition of the tournament and was held from 21 November through 26 November 1977. First-seeded Tim Gullikson won the singles title.

== Finals ==
=== Singles ===
(United States) Tim Gullikson defeated (Egypt) Ismail El Shafei 6–7, 7–5, 7–6, 6–4

- It was Gullikson's 2nd singles title of the year and of his career.

=== Doubles ===
(United States) Chris Delaney / (United States) Pat DuPré defeated (Australia) Steve Docherty / (United States) Tom Gorman 7–6, 7–6
