= 1984 Taipei International Championships =

- Date: 29 October – 4 November
- Edition: 8th
- Category: Grand Prix
- Draw: 32S / 16D
- Prize money: $75,000
- Surface: Carpet / indoor
- Location: Taipei, Taiwan

Champions

Singles
- (United States) Brad Gilbert

Doubles
- (United States) Ken Flach / (United States) Robert Seguso
- Taipei Grand Prix

The 1984 Taipei International Championships was a men's tennis tournament played on indoor carpet courts in Taipei, Taiwan that was part of the 1984 Volvo Grand Prix. It was the eighth edition of the tournament and was held from 29 October through 4 November 1984. First-seeded Brad Gilbert won the singles title.

== Finals ==
=== Singles ===
(United States) Brad Gilbert defeated (Australia) Wally Masur 6–3, 6–3

- It was Gilbert's 2nd singles title of the year and the 3rd of his career.

=== Doubles ===
(United States) Ken Flach / (United States) Robert Seguso defeated (United States) Drew Gitlin / (United States) Hank Pfister 6–1, 6–7, 6–2
