= 1994 Tel Aviv Open – Singles =

Singles
- 1994 Tel Aviv Open

Final
- Champion: (South Africa) Wayne Ferreira
- Runner-up: (Israel) Amos Mansdorf
- Score: 7–6^{(7–4)}, 6–3

Events
Singles	Doubles
- Tel Aviv Open

Stefano Pescosolido was the defending champion, but lost in the second round this year.

Wayne Ferreira won the tournament, beating Amos Mansdorf in the final, 7–6^{(7–4)}, 6–3.

== Seeds ==
1. (South Africa) Wayne Ferreira (champion)
2. (Russia) Yevgeny Kafelnikov (first round)
3. (Austria) Thomas Muster (semifinals)
4. (Germany) Bernd Karbacher (first round)
5. (Spain) Javier Sánchez (first round)
6. (Russia) Andrei Chesnokov (first round)
7. (France) Fabrice Santoro (semifinals)
8. (Sweden) Jonas Björkman (quarterfinals)

== Draw ==
Key

- Q = Qualifier
- WC = Wild card
- LL = Lucky loser
- Alt = Alternate
- ITF = ITF entry
- PR = Protected ranking
- SR = Special ranking
- SE = Special exempt
- JE = Junior exempt
- JR = Junior Accelerator Programme entrant
- CO = College Accelerator Programme entrant
- NG = Next Gen Accelerator Program entrant
- w/o = Walkover
- r = Retired
- d = Defaulted

=== Finals ===
Semifinals
1	(South Africa) Wayne Ferreira	3	6	6
3	(Austria) Thomas Muster	6	3	2
(Israel) Amos Mansdorf	7^{7}	2	6
7	(France) Fabrice Santoro	6^{2}	6	2

Final
1	(South Africa) Wayne Ferreira	7^{7}	6
(Israel) Amos Mansdorf	6^{4}	3

=== Top half ===
First round
1	(South Africa) W Ferreira	6	4	6
(Spain) F Roig	3	6	2
(United States) V Spadea	6	7
Q	(Israel) O Sela	3	5
(Sweden) C Bergström	6	6
(Spain) J Burillo	3	2
WC	(Israel) E Ran	6^{5}	6^{6}
8	(Sweden) J Björkman	7^{7}	7^{8}
3	(Austria) T Muster	6	6
WC	(Israel) G Bloom	3	4
(Italy) S Pescosolido	5	7^{7}	6
(United States) B Shelton	7	6^{5}	4
(Belgium) F Dewulf	7	6
(United States) C Adams	5	4
(Brazil) L Mattar	6	6
6	(Russia) A Chesnokov	4	2

Second round
1	(South Africa) W Ferreira	6	6
(United States) V Spadea	4	2
(Sweden) C Bergström	3	6	2
8	(Sweden) J Björkman	6	2	6
3	(Austria) T Muster	7^{7}	5	6
(Italy) S Pescosolido	6^{3}	7	3
(Belgium) F Dewulf	6	6	6
(Brazil) L Mattar	4	7	7

Quarterfinals
1	(South Africa) W Ferreira	7	6
8	(Sweden) J Björkman	5	4
3	(Austria) T Muster	6	6
(Brazil) L Mattar	4	2

Semifinals
1	(South Africa) W Ferreira	3	6	6
3	(Austria) T Muster	6	3	2

=== Bottom half ===
First round
5	(Spain) J Sánchez	6^{3}	6^{5}
(Israel) A Mansdorf	7^{7}	7^{7}
(United States) B Gilbert	3	4
(Sweden) L Jonsson	6	6
(Russia) A Cherkasov	6	6
Q	(New Zealand) G Wilson	3	3
(Italy) G Pozzi	6	7
4	(Germany) B Karbacher	2	5
7	(France) F Santoro	6	6
(Germany) P Kühnen	3	1
WC	(Israel) E Erlich	3	6	4
Q	(Israel) J Erlich	6	3	6
Q	(Germany) C Saceanu	6	4	6
(Sweden) J Apell	4	6	3
(South Africa) M Ondruska	6	6
2	(Russia) Y Kafelnikov	4	2

Second round
(Israel) A Mansdorf	4	6	6
(Sweden) L Jonsson	6	4	4
(Russia) A Cherkasov	7	6
(Italy) G Pozzi	5	2
7	(France) F Santoro	6	6
Q	(Israel) J Erlich	0	0
Q	(Germany) C Saceanu	5	2
(South Africa) M Ondruska	7	6

Quarterfinals
(Israel) A Mansdorf	6	6
(Russia) A Cherkasov	1	4
7	(France) F Santoro	6	5	6
(South Africa) M Ondruska	4	7	4

Semifinals
(Israel) A Mansdorf	7^{7}	2	6
7	(France) F Santoro	6^{2}	6	2
