= Bangkok Tennis Classic =

Defunct tennis tournament
- Tour: Grand Prix circuit
- Founded: 1980
- Abolished: 1982
- Editions: 3
- Location: Bangkok, Thainland
- Surface: Carpet / indoor

The Bangkok Tennis Classic was a men's tennis tournament played in Bangkok, Thailand from 1980 until 1982. The event was part of the Grand Prix tennis circuit and was held on indoor carpet courts.

== Finals ==
=== Singles ===
Year	Champions	Runners-up	Score
1980	(India) Vijay Amritraj	(United States) Brian Teacher	6–3, 7–5
1981	(United States) Bill Scanlon	(Sweden) Mats Wilander	6–2, 6–3
1982	(United States) Mike Bauer	(United States) Jim Gurfein	6–1, 6–2

=== Doubles ===
Year	Champions	Runners-up	Score
1980	(United States) Ferdi Taygan (United States) Brian Teacher	(Netherlands) Tom Okker (United States) Dick Stockton	7–6, 7–6
1981	(United States) John Austin (United States) Mike Cahill	(United States) Lloyd Bourne (United States) Van Winitsky	6–3, 7–6
1982	(United States) Mike Bauer (United States) John Benson	(United States) Charles Strode (United States) Morris Strode	7–5, 3–6, 6–3

== See also ==
- Bangkok Open – women's tournament
- List of tennis tournaments
