= 1993 Grand Prix Hassan II =

- Date: 15–22 March
- Edition: 9th
- Category: World Series
- Draw: 32S / 16D
- Prize money: $175,000
- Surface: Clay / outdoor
- Location: Casablanca, Morocco

Champions

Singles
- (Argentina) Guillermo Pérez Roldán

Doubles
- (United States) Mike Bauer / (South Africa) Piet Norval
- Grand Prix Hassan II

The 1993 Grand Prix Hassan II was an Association of Tennis Professionals (ATP) men's tennis tournament held in Casablanca, Morocco and was part of the World Series of the 1993 ATP Tour. It was the 9th edition of the tournament and was held from 15 to 22 March 1993. Third-seeded Guillermo Pérez Roldán won his second consecutive singles title at the event.

== Finals ==
=== Singles ===
(Argentina) Guillermo Pérez Roldán defeated (Morocco) Younes El Aynaoui 6–4, 6–3

- It was Perez-Roldan's only title of the year and the 9th of his career.

=== Doubles ===
(United States) Mike Bauer / (South Africa) Piet Norval defeated (Latvia) Ģirts Dzelde / (Croatia) Goran Prpić 7–5, 7–6

- It was Bauer's 1st title of the year and the 10th of his career. It was Norval's 1st title of the year and the 2nd of his career.
