= 1979 Cathay Trust Championships =

- Date: 12–18 November
- Edition: 3rd
- Category: Grand Prix
- Draw: 32S / 16D
- Prize money: $75,000
- Surface: Carpet / indoor
- Location: Taipei, Taiwan

Champions

Singles
- (United States) Bob Lutz

Doubles
- (Australia) John Marks / (Australia) Mark Edmondson
← 1978 ·	Taipei Grand Prix	· 1980 →

The 1979 Cathay Trust Championships was a men's tennis tournament played on indoor carpet courts in Taipei, Taiwan that was part of the 1979 Colgate-Palmolive Grand Prix. It was the third edition of the tournament and was held from 12 November through 18 November 1979. Fourth-seeded Bob Lutz won the singles title.

== Finals ==
=== Singles ===
(United States) Bob Lutz defeated (United States) Pat Du Pré 6–3, 6–4, 2–6, 6–3

- It was Lutz's 1st singles title of the year and the 8th of his career.

=== Doubles ===
(Australia) John Marks / (Australia) Mark Edmondson defeated (United States) Pat Du Pré / (United States) Bob Lutz 6–1, 3–6, 6–4
