= 1978 Colgate-Hong Kong Patrons Classic =

Tennis tournament

- Date: 7–12 November
- Edition: 6th
- Category: Grand Prix
- Draw: 32S / 16D
- Prize money: $75,000
- Surface: Hard / outdoor
- Location: Hong Kong

Champions

Singles
- (United States) Eliot Teltscher

Doubles
- (Australia) Mark Edmondson / (Australia) John Marks
← 1977 ·	Hong Kong Open	· 1979 →

The 1978 Colgate-Hong Kong Patrons Classic, also known as the Hong Kong Open, was a men's tennis tournament played on outdoor hard courts in Hong Kong that was part of the 1978 Grand Prix tennis circuit. It was the sixth edition of the event and was held from 7 November through 12 November 1978. Eighth-seeded Eliot Teltscher won the singles title.

== Finals ==
=== Singles ===
(United States) Eliot Teltscher defeated (United States) Pat DuPré 6–4, 6–3, 6–2

- It was Teltscher's first singles title of his career.

=== Doubles ===
(Australia) Mark Edmondson / (Australia) John Marks defeated (United States) Hank Pfister / (United States) Brad Rowe 5–7, 7–6, 6–1
