= 1992 Tel Aviv Open =

- Date: October 12–19
- Edition: 13th
- Category: World Series
- Draw: 32S / 16D
- Prize money: $130,000
- Surface: Hard / outdoor
- Location: Ramat HaSharon, Tel Aviv District, Israel
- Venue: Israel Tennis Centers

Champions

Singles
- (United States) Jeff Tarango

Doubles
- (United States) Mike Bauer / (Portugal) João Cunha Silva
← 1991 ·	Tel Aviv Open	· 1993 →

The 1992 Tel Aviv Open was a men's tennis tournament played on hard courts that was part of the World Series of the 1992 ATP Tour. It was the 13th edition of the tournament and was played at the Israel Tennis Centers in the Tel Aviv District city of Ramat HaSharon, Israel from October 12 through October 19, 1992. Jeff Tarango won the singles title.

== Finals ==
=== Singles ===
(United States) Jeff Tarango defeated (France) Stéphane Simian 4–6, 6–3, 6–4

- It was Tarango's 2nd singles title of the year and the 2nd and last of his career.

=== Doubles ===
(United States) Mike Bauer / (Portugal) João Cunha Silva defeated (Netherlands) Mark Koevermans / (Sweden) Tobias Svantesson 6–3, 6–4

- It was Bauer's only title of the year and the 9th of his career. It was Cunha Silva's only title of the year and the 1st of his career.
