= 1993 Grand Prix Hassan II – Doubles =

Doubles
- 1993 Grand Prix Hassan II

Final
- Champions: (United States) Mike Bauer (South Africa) Piet Norval
- Runners-up: (Latvia) Ģirts Dzelde (Croatia) Goran Prpić
- Score: 7–5, 7–6

Details
- Draw: 16
- Seeds: 4

Events
Singles	Doubles
- Grand Prix Hassan II

Horacio de la Peña and Jorge Lozano were the defending champions, but lost in the semifinals this year.

Mike Bauer and Piet Norval won in the final 7–5, 7–6, against Ģirts Dzelde and Goran Prpić.

== Seeds ==
1. (Netherlands) Mark Koevermans / (Netherlands) Menno Oosting (quarterfinals)
2. (United States) Mike Bauer / (South Africa) Piet Norval (champions)
3. (Sweden) Christer Allgårdh / (Sweden) Tobias Svantesson (quarterfinals)
4. (Argentina) Horacio de la Peña / (Mexico) Jorge Lozano (semifinals)

== Draw ==
Key

- Q = Qualifier
- WC = Wild card
- LL = Lucky loser
- Alt = Alternate
- ITF = ITF entry
- PR = Protected ranking
- SR = Special ranking
- SE = Special exempt
- JE = Junior exempt
- JR = Junior Accelerator Programme entrant
- CO = College Accelerator Programme entrant
- NG = Next Gen Accelerator Program entrant
- w/o = Walkover
- r = Retired
- d = Defaulted

=== Draw ===
First round
1	(Netherlands) M Koevermans (Netherlands) M Oosting	7	5	6
(Germany) P Baur (Germany) U Riglewski	6	7	2
(Portugal) J Cunha e Silva (Finland) O Rahnasto	6	6	6
WC	(Haiti) R Agénor (Morocco) Y El Aynaoui	2	7	7
3	(Sweden) C Allgårdh (Sweden) T Svantesson	6	6
(Argentina) C Miniussi (Argentina) D Orsanic	3	3
(Germany) L Koslowski (Russia) A Merinov	2	3
(Latvia) Ģ Dzelde (Croatia) G Prpić	6	6
(Spain) J Arrese (Spain) F Roig	6	6
(Belgium) X Daufresne (Kenya) P Wekesa	3	3
WC	(Morocco) K Alami (Morocco) M Ridaoui	2	3
4	(Argentina) H de la Peña (Mexico) J Lozano	6	6
(Belgium) F Dewulf (Belgium) T Vanhoudt	6	4	0
(Czech Republic) V Flégl (Germany) M-K Goellner	2	6	6
Q	(Spain) À Corretja (Spain) MA Gorriz	3	4
2	(United States) M Bauer (South Africa) P Norval	6	6

Quarterfinals
1	(Netherlands) M Koevermans (Netherlands) M Oosting	2	6	5
WC	(Haiti) R Agénor (Morocco) Y El Aynaoui	6	2	7
3	(Sweden) C Allgårdh (Sweden) T Svantesson	6	4	3
(Latvia) Ģ Dzelde (Croatia) G Prpić	3	6	6
(Spain) J Arrese (Spain) F Roig	6	5	1
4	(Argentina) H de la Peña (Mexico) J Lozano	3	7	6
(Czech Republic) V Flégl (Germany) M-K Goellner	7	6	3
2	(United States) M Bauer (South Africa) P Norval	6	7	6

Semifinals
WC	(Haiti) R Agénor (Morocco) Y El Aynaoui	3	3
(Latvia) Ģ Dzelde (Croatia) G Prpić	6	6
4	(Argentina) H de la Peña (Mexico) J Lozano	6	3	4
2	(United States) M Bauer (South Africa) P Norval	4	6	6

Final
(Latvia) Ģ Dzelde (Croatia) G Prpić	5	6
2	(United States) M Bauer (South Africa) P Norval	7	7
