= 1979 Colgate-Hong Kong Patrons Classic =

Tennis tournament

- Date: 5–11 November
- Edition: 7th
- Category: Grand Prix
- Draw: 32S / 16D
- Prize money: $75,000
- Surface: Hard / outdoor
- Location: Hong Kong

Champions

Singles
- (United States) Jimmy Connors

Doubles
- (United States) Pat Du Pré / (United States) Bob Lutz
← 1978 ·	Hong Kong Open	· 1980 →

The 1979 Colgate-Hong Kong Patrons Classic, also known as the Hong Kong Open, was a men's tennis tournament played on outdoor hard courts in Hong Kong that was part of the 1979 Grand Prix tennis circuit. It was the seventh edition of the event and was held from 5 November through 11 November 1979. First-seeded Jimmy Connors won the singles title.

== Finals ==
=== Singles ===
(United States) Jimmy Connors defeated (United States) Pat DuPré 7–5, 6–3, 6–1

- It was Connors' 7th singles title of the year and the 78th of his career.

=== Doubles ===
(United States) Pat Du Pré / (United States) Bob Lutz defeated (United States) Steve Denton / (United States) Mark Turpin 6–3, 6–4
