= 1983 Taipei International Championships =

- Date: 7–13 November
- Edition: 7th
- Category: Grand Prix
- Draw: 32S / 16D
- Prize money: $75,000
- Surface: Carpet / indoor
- Location: Taipei, Taiwan

Champions

Singles
- (United States) Nduka Odizor

Doubles
- (Australia) Kim Warwick / (Australia) Wally Masur
← 1982 ·	Taipei Grand Prix	· 1984 →

The 1983 Taipei International Championships was a men's tennis tournament played on indoor carpet courts in Taipei, Taiwan that was part of the 1983 Volvo Grand Prix. It was the seventh edition of the tournament and was held from 7 November through 13 November 1983. Unseeded Nduka Odizor won the singles title.

== Finals ==
=== Singles ===
(United States) Nduka Odizor defeated (United States) Scott Davis 6–4, 3–6, 6–4

- It was Odizor's only singles title of his career.

=== Doubles ===
(Australia) Kim Warwick / (Australia) Wally Masur defeated (United States) Ken Flach / (United States) Robert Seguso 7–6, 6–4
