= Michael Daniel (tennis) =

Israeli tennis player

- Native name: מיכאל דניאל
- Country (sports): Israel
- Born: 21 November 1965 (age 59); Tel Aviv, Israel
- Height: 6 ft 2 in (188 cm)
- Prize money: $38,093

Singles
- Career record: 0–3
- Highest ranking: No. 231 (5 October 1992)

Grand Slam singles results
- French Open: Q1 (1993)
- Wimbledon: Q2 (1992)
- US Open: Q1 (1992, 1993)

Doubles
- Career record: 1–5
- Highest ranking: No. 251 (5 October 1992)

Michael Daniel (Hebrew: מיכאל דניאל; born 21 November 1965) is an Israeli former professional tennis player.

Daniel, who was born in Tel Aviv, featured in the singles main draw in three editions of the Tel Aviv Open. He reached a best singles ranking of 231 in the world and in the early 1990s appeared in grand slam qualifiers, including Wimbledon.

As a doubles player he was a quarter-finalist at the 1992 Tel Aviv Open and came close to a first round upset at the Kremlin Cup the same year, when he and Gilad Bloom pushed reigning US Open champions Jim Grabb and Richey Reneberg to a third set tiebreak.
