= 1993 Grand Prix Hassan II – Singles =

Singles
- 1993 Grand Prix Hassan II

Final
- Champion: (Argentina) Guillermo Pérez Roldán
- Runner-up: (Morocco) Younes El Aynaoui
- Score: 6–4, 6–3

Details
- Draw: 32
- Seeds: 8

Events
Singles	Doubles
- Grand Prix Hassan II

Guillermo Pérez Roldán was the defending champion at the 1993 Grand Prix Hassan II men's singles tennis event.

Pérez-Roldán successfully defended his title, defeating Younes El Aynaoui 6–4, 6–3 in the final.

== Seeds ==
1. (Spain) Jordi Arrese (first round)
2. (Argentina) Franco Davín (quarterfinals)
3. (Argentina) Guillermo Pérez Roldán (champion)
4. (Sweden) Magnus Gustafsson (second round)
5. (Croatia) Goran Prpić (first round)
6. (Belgium) Bart Wuyts (quarterfinals)
7. (Austria) Horst Skoff (semifinals)
8. (Spain) Àlex Corretja (first round)

== Draw ==
Key

- Q = Qualifier
- WC = Wild card
- LL = Lucky loser
- Alt = Alternate
- ITF = ITF entry
- PR = Protected ranking
- SR = Special ranking
- SE = Special exempt
- JE = Junior exempt
- JR = Junior Accelerator Programme entrant
- CO = College Accelerator Programme entrant
- NG = Next Gen Accelerator Program entrant
- w/o = Walkover
- r = Retired
- d = Defaulted

=== Finals ===
Semifinals
(Austria) Gilbert Schaller	6^{5}	6	6^{5}
3	(Argentina) Guillermo Pérez Roldán	7^{7}	0	7^{7}
WC	(Morocco) Younes El Aynaoui	7	6
7	(Austria) Horst Skoff	5	4

Final
3	(Argentina) Guillermo Pérez Roldán	6	6
WC	(Morocco) Younes El Aynaoui	4	3

=== Top half ===
First round
1	(Spain) J Arrese	6	3	6^{2}
(Germany) M-K Goellner	3	6	7^{7}
(Spain) M A Gorriz	3	4
(Austria) G Schaller	6	6
(Czech Republic) M Střelba	6	6
(Spain) F Roig	4	2
(Austria) A Antonitsch	3	6	7^{7}
8	(Spain) À Corretja	6	1	6^{3}
3	(Argentina) G Pérez Roldán	6	6
Q	(Argentina) M Stringari	3	2
(Argentina) C Miniussi	6	6^{3}	7
(Italy) C Pistolesi	4	7^{7}	5
(Spain) A Berasategui	6	6
(Sweden) L Jonsson	3	3
(Argentina) H de la Peña	7^{7}	6
5	(Croatia) G Prpić	6^{3}	3

Second round
(Germany) M-K Goellner	2	1
(Austria) G Schaller	6	6
(Czech Republic) M Střelba	7^{7}	6
(Austria) A Antonitsch	6^{3}	3
3	(Argentina) G Pérez Roldán	6	6
(Argentina) C Miniussi	3	0
(Spain) A Berasategui	6	6
(Argentina) H de la Peña	3	2

Quarterfinals
(Austria) G Schaller	6^{5}	7^{7}	6
(Czech Republic) M Střelba	7^{7}	6^{2}	0
3	(Argentina) G Pérez Roldán	7^{7}	7^{7}
(Spain) A Berasategui	6^{3}	6^{2}

Semifinals
(Austria) G Schaller	6^{5}	6	6^{5}
3	(Argentina) G Pérez Roldán	7^{7}	0	7^{7}

=== Bottom half ===
First round
6	(Belgium) B Wuyts	6	2	6
(Argentina) R Azar	3	6	1
(Germany) L Koslowski	3	3
WC	(Morocco) K Alami	6	6
WC	(Morocco) Y El Aynaoui	6^{5}	6	6
(Portugal) J Cunha Silva	7^{7}	1	1
(Spain) J F Altur	5	2
4	(Sweden) M Gustafsson	7	6
7	(Austria) H Skoff	6	7
Q	(Netherlands) M Koevermans	2	5
Q	(France) F Fontang	6	6
Q	(Argentina) D Orsanic	0	4
(Haiti) R Agénor	2	7^{10}	4
(Germany) P Baur	6	6^{8}	6
WC	(United States) M Ridaoui	6	4	2
2	(Argentina) F Davín	2	6	6

Second round
6	(Belgium) B Wuyts	6	6
WC	(Morocco) K Alami	1	4
WC	(Morocco) Y El Aynaoui	6	1	7
4	(Sweden) M Gustafsson	4	6	5
7	(Austria) H Skoff	7^{7}	6
Q	(France) F Fontang	6^{3}	1
(Germany) P Baur	0	1
2	(Argentina) F Davín	6	6

Quarterfinals
6	(Belgium) B Wuyts	3	1
WC	(Morocco) Y El Aynaoui	6	6
7	(Austria) H Skoff	7^{7}	6
2	(Argentina) F Davín	6^{1}	4

Semifinals
WC	(Morocco) Y El Aynaoui	7	6
7	(Austria) H Skoff	5	4
