= Mike Cahill (tennis) =

American tennis player

- Country (sports): United States
- Residence: Germantown, Wisconsin
- Born: June 17, 1952 (age 74) Waukesha, Wisconsin
- Height: 6 ft (1.8 m)
- Retired: 1984
- Plays: Right-handed

Singles
- Career record: 99–156
- Career titles: 0
- Highest ranking: No. 68 (May 10, 1976)

Grand Slam singles results
- French Open: R2 (1979)
- Wimbledon: R1 (1976, 1979)
- US Open: R4 (1981)

Doubles
- Career record: 178–166
- Career titles: 5
- Highest ranking: No. 94 (January 3, 1983)

Grand Slam doubles results
- French Open: R2 (1976)
- Wimbledon: R1 (1976, 1979)
- US Open: QF (1981)

Michael Cahill (born June 17, 1952) is a former professional tennis player from the United States.

Cahill enjoyed most of his tennis success while playing doubles. During his career, he won five doubles titles. He achieved a career-high doubles ranking of world no. 94 in 1983.

Cahill played college tennis at the University of Alabama.

== Career finals ==
=== Singles (1 runner-up) ===
Result	W/L	Date	Tournament	Surface	Opponent	Score
Loss	0–1	Aug 1979	Stowe, U.S.	Hard	(United States) Jimmy Connors	0–6, 1–6

Source: ATP

=== Doubles (5 titles, 14 runner-ups) ===
Result	W/L	Date	Tournament	Surface	Partner	Opponents	Score
Loss	0–1	Jul 1975	Chicago, U.S.	Carpet	(United States) John Whitlinger	(Australia) John Alexander (Australia) Phil Dent	3–6, 4–6
Loss	0–2	Apr 1976	Sacramento, U.S.	Carpet	(United States) John Whitlinger	(United States) Tom Gorman (United States) Sherwood Stewart	6–3, 4–6, 4–6
Loss	0–3	Aug 1976	Boston, U.S.	Clay	(United States) John Whitlinger	(Australia) Ray Ruffels (Australia) Allan Stone	6–3, 3–6, 6–7
Win	1–3	Sep 1976	Bermuda	Clay	(United States) John Whitlinger	(Australia) Dick Crealy (Australia) Ray Ruffels	6–4, 4–6, 7–6
Loss	1–4	Nov 1977	Manila, Philippines	Hard	(United States) Terry Moor	(Australia) Chris Kachel (Australia) John Marks	6–4, 0–6, 6–7
Win	2–4	Dec 1977	Bombay, India	Clay	(United States) Terry Moor	(Mexico) Marcelo Lara (India) Jasjit Singh	6–7, 6–4, 6–4
Loss	2–5	Aug 1978	Atlanta, U.S.	Hard	(Mexico) Marcelo Lara	(Australia) John Alexander (United States) Butch Walts	6–3, 4–6, 6–7
Win	3–5	Aug 1979	Stowe, U.S.	Hard	(United States) Steve Krulevitz	(India) Anand Amritraj (Australia) Colin Dibley	3–6, 6–3, 6–4
Loss	3–6	Oct 1979	Tel Aviv, Israel	Hard	(Australia) Colin Dibley	(Romania) Ilie Năstase (Netherlands) Tom Okker	5–7, 4–6
Loss	3–7	Nov 1979	Tokyo Indoor, Japan	Carpet	(United States) Terry Moor	(United States) Marty Riessen (United States) Sherwood Stewart	4–6, 6–7
Loss	3–8	Dec 1979	Johannesburg, South Africa	Hard	(United Kingdom) Buster Mottram	(South Africa) Bob Hewitt (South Africa) Frew McMillan	6–1, 1–6, 4–6
Loss	3–9	Mar 1981	Memphis, U.S.	Carpet	(United States) Tom Gullikson	(United States) Gene Mayer (United States) Sandy Mayer	6–7, 7–6, 6–7
Loss	3–10	Nov 1981	Taipei, Taiwan	Carpet	(United States) John Austin	(United States) John Benson (United States) Mike Bauer	4–6, 3–6
Win	4–10	Nov 1981	Bangkok, Thailand	Carpet	(United States) John Austin	(United States) Lloyd Bourne (United States) Van Winitsky	6–3, 7–6
Loss	4–11	Feb 1982	Genova WCT, Italy	Carpet	(United Kingdom) Buster Mottram	(Czechoslovakia) Pavel Složil (Czechoslovakia) Tomáš Šmíd	7–6, 5–7, 3–6
Win	5–11	Oct 1982	Maui, U.S.	Hard	(United States) Eliot Teltscher	(Paraguay) Francisco González (South Africa) Bernard Mitton	6–4, 6–4
Loss	5–12	Nov 1982	Dortmund WCT, Germany	Carpet	(Paraguay) Francisco González	(Czechoslovakia) Pavel Složil (Czechoslovakia) Tomáš Šmíd	2–6, 7–6, 1–6
Loss	5–13	Dec 1982	Chicago-2 WCT, U.S.	Carpet	(United States) Bruce Manson	(India) Anand Amritraj (India) Vijay Amritraj	6–3, 2–6, 3–6
Loss	5–14	Dec 1982	Hartford WCT, U.S.	Carpet	(United States) Tracy Delatte	(United States) Robert Lutz (United States) Dick Stockton	6–7, 3–6

Source: ATP
