= Brian Teacher =

American tennis player (born 1954)

- Full name: Brian David Teacher
- Country (sports): United States
- Born: December 23, 1954 (age 71) San Diego, California, US
- Height: 6 ft 3 in (1.91 m)
- Turned pro: 1973
- Retired: 1986
- Plays: Right-handed (one-handed backhand)
- Prize money: $1,426,514

Singles
- Career record: 333–236 (58.5%)
- Career titles: 8
- Highest ranking: No. 7 (October 5, 1981)

Grand Slam singles results
- Australian Open: W (1980)
- French Open: 3R (1978)
- Wimbledon: QF (1982)
- US Open: 4R (1978, 1980)

Doubles
- Career record: 341–207 (62.2%)
- Career titles: 16
- Highest ranking: No. 5 (1981)

Grand Slam doubles results
- Australian Open: 1R (1982)
- French Open: QF (1977)
- Wimbledon: QF (1977, 1981, 1983)
- US Open: SF (1977)

Grand Slam mixed doubles results
- US Open: F (1977)

Brian David Teacher (born December 23, 1954) is an American former professional tennis player. He reached career-high rankings of world No. 7 in singles, and world No. 5 in doubles, both in 1981. Teacher is best known for being a Grand Slam singles champion, triumphing in singles at the 1980 Australian Open, making him one of the few American men in the Open Era to capture a Grand Slam singles championship. Over the course of his professional career, Teacher won eight ATP singles titles and 16 doubles titles.

Prior to turning professional, Teacher played at the University of California, Los Angeles (UCLA). Playing for the UCLA Bruins from 1973 to 1976, he earned All-America honors in each of his four seasons and helped lead the team to multiple NCAA team championships.

Following his playing career, he became a touring coach on both the ATP Tour and the WTA Tour. He coached a number of singles players, most notably guiding British player Greg Rusedski from outside the top 80 into the world top ten and to the finals of the 1997 US Open in a little over a year. In addition, Teacher coached five players who reached the world No. 1 ranking in doubles: Jim Grabb, Richey Reneberg, Daniel Nestor, Max Mirnyi, and Mark Knowles. He has been inducted into several athletic halls of fame, including the Intercollegiate Tennis Association (ITA) Hall of Fame.

He currently runs the Brian Teacher Tennis Academy in South Pasadena, California.

== Early and personal life ==
Teacher was born in San Diego, California, and is Jewish. He attended Crawford High School in San Diego, graduating in 1972.

In 1979, he married fellow Californian Kathy May, also a top-10 tennis player. They subsequently divorced.

He earned an undergraduate degree in economics from UCLA, finishing his requirements after his competitive career was over. Following his competitive career, he earned an MBA at the USC Marshall School of Business.

He later lived in Beverly Hills, California. He is currently married with two children.

== Tennis career ==
=== Junior, high school, and college ===
Teacher won a CIF singles title in tennis in 1972 during his senior year while at Crawford High School. In 1972, he also won the boys' 18 singles and doubles national titles at the USTA Boys' 18 National Championships.

At the University of California-Los Angeles, he won the Pacific-8 singles and doubles championship in his sophomore season in 1974. He was also an All-American in four consecutive years from 1973 to 1976, and was a member of the UCLA teams that won the NCAA Men's Tennis Championship back-to-back in 1975 and 1976. He turned professional just prior to completing his degree requirements.

=== Professional career ===
Teacher’s earliest appearance in a Grand Slam tournament was in 1972. That year, along with American Steve Turner he made his way through the multi-round qualification brackets to advance into the main draw of the 1972 US Open, where he competed as a 17-year-old; he lost in the first round.

He reached the finals in the South Australian Open and the New South Wales Open, in Adelaide and Sydney, in 1977. At the inaugural 1978 Seiko World Super Tennis tournament in Tokyo, Teacher upset fellow UCLA graduates Jimmy Connors and Arthur Ashe, before losing in the indoor carpet final to top seed Björn Borg of Sweden in straight sets.

In 1980, he won the singles title at the Australian Open, becoming the second Jewish player to win a men's Grand Slam Singles championship (after Dick Savitt). He won the final over Kim Warwick of Australia in straight sets. With his Grand Slam victory, Teacher is one of only five American male players in the Open era to have won a single Grand Slam event (along with Michael Chang, Vitas Gerulaitis, Andy Roddick, and Roscoe Tanner). Seven more Americans have more than one Slam (Stan Smith, Arthur Ashe, Jim Courier, Jimmy Connors, Andre Agassi, John McEnroe, and Pete Sampras)..

Teacher's career-high ATP world singles ranking was No. 7, and his world doubles ranking was No. 5, both in 1981. He won 8 Grand Prix circuit career singles titles, and 16 doubles titles.

=== Coaching career ===
Following his playing career, he became an ATP and WTA touring coach, working with future world #1 Andre Agassi and Greg Rusedski. Under his tutelage, Rusedski made a run from #85 in the world to the top ten and the U.S. Open finals over a 14-month span.

Teacher also coached five players who reached world #1 in doubles: Jim Grabb, Richey Reneberg, Daniel Nestor, Max Mirnyi, and Mark Knowles. On the women's circuit, he coached WTA tour player Marissa Irvin.

He currently runs the Brian Teacher Tennis Academy in South Pasadena, California.

=== Halls of fame ===
Teacher was inducted in 1996 into the Southern California Jewish Sports Hall of Fame, in 2001 into the Intercollegiate Tennis Association (ITA) Hall of Fame (the NCAA Tennis Hall of Fame), and in 2008 into the San Diego Tennis Hall of Fame. In 2014 he was inducted into the International Jewish Sports Hall of Fame, and in 2015 into the Southern California Tennis Association Hall of Fame.

== Grand Slam finals ==
=== Singles (1 win) ===
Result	Year	Championship	Surface	Opponent	Score
Win	1980	Australian Open	Grass	(Australia) Kim Warwick	7–5, 7–6^{(7–4)}, 6–3

== Career finals ==
=== Singles: 23 (8 titles / 15 runners-up) ===
Legend Grand Slam tournaments (1) Tennis Masters Cup (0) Grand Prix (7)	Titles by surface Hard (2) Grass (2) Clay (0) Carpet (4)

Result	W/L	Date	Tournament	Surface	Opponent	Score
Loss	0–1	Sep 1976	Newport, U.S.	Grass	(India) Vijay Amritraj	3–6, 6–4, 3–6, 1–6
Loss	0–2	Jan 1977	Adelaide, Australia	Grass	(United States) Victor Amaya	1–6, 4–6
Win	1–2	Apr 1977	Jackson, Mississippi, U.S.	Carpet	(United States) Bill Scanlon	6–3, 6–3
Loss	1–3	Dec 1977	Sydney Outdoor, Australia	Grass	(United States) Roscoe Tanner	3–6, 6–3, 3–6, 7–6, 4–6
Loss	1–4	Oct 1978	Tokyo Indoor, Japan	Carpet	(Sweden) Björn Borg	3–6, 4–6
Win	2–4	Nov 1978	Taipei, Taiwan	Carpet	(United States) Tom Gorman	6–3, 6–3, 6–3
Win	3–4	Jul 1979	Newport, Rhode Island, U.S.	Grass	(United States) Stan Smith	1–6, 6–3, 6–4
Loss	3–5	Apr 1980	Los Angeles, U.S.	Hard	(United States) Gene Mayer	3–6, 2–6
Loss	3–6	Nov 1980	Hong Kong	Hard	(Czechoslovakia) Ivan Lendl	7–5, 6–7^{(2–7)}, 3–6
Loss	3–7	Nov 1980	Taipei, Taiwan	Carpet	(Czechoslovakia) Ivan Lendl	7–6, 3–6, 3–6, 6–7^{(5–7)}
Loss	3–8	Nov 1980	Bangkok, Thailand	Carpet	(India) Vijay Amritraj	3–6, 5–7
Loss	3–9	Dec 1980	Sydney Outdoor, Australia	Grass	(United States) Fritz Buehning	3–6, 7–6^{(7–5)}, 6–7^{(5–7)}
Win	4–9	Dec 1980	Australian Open, Melbourne	Grass	(Australia) Kim Warwick	7–5, 7–6^{(7–4)}, 6–3
Win	5–9	Aug 1981	Columbus, Ohio, U.S.	Hard	(United States) John Austin	6–3, 6–2
Loss	5–10	Sep 1981	San Francisco, U.S.	Carpet	(United States) Eliot Teltscher	3–6, 6–7^{(4–7)}
Loss	5–11	Sep 1982	Maui, Hawaii, U.S.	Hard	(Australia) John Fitzgerald	2–6, 3–6
Win	6–11	Dec 1982	Dortmund WCT, West Germany	Carpet	(Poland) Wojciech Fibak	6–7, 6–4, 6–4, 2–6, 6–4
Win	7–11	Mar 1983	Munich WCT, West Germany	Carpet	(United States) Mark Dickson	1–6, 6–4, 6–2, 6–3
Win	8–11	Aug 1983	Columbus, Ohio, U.S.	Hard	(United States) Bill Scanlon	7–6, 6–4
Loss	8–12	Sep 1983	Dallas, Texas, U.S.	Hard	(Ecuador) Andrés Gómez	7–6^{(7–2)}, 1–6, 1–6
Loss	8–13	Jun 1984	Bristol, U.K.	Grass	(United States) Johan Kriek	7–6, 6–7, 4–6
Loss	8–14	Jul 1984	Gstaad, Switzerland	Clay	(Sweden) Joakim Nyström	4–6, 2–6
Loss	8–15	Jul 1985	Livingston, U.S.	Hard	(United States) Brad Gilbert	6–4, 5–7, 0–6

=== Doubles: 23 (16 titles / 7 runners-up) ===
Result	W/L	Date	Tournament	Surface	Partner	Opponents	Score
Win	1–0	Aug 1976	Columbus, U.S.	Hard	(United States) William Brown	(United States) Fred McNair (United States) Sherwood Stewart	6–3, 6–4
Loss	1–1	Mar 1978	Miami, U.S.	Clay	(Australia) Bob Carmichael	(United States) Tom Gullikson (United States) Gene Mayer	6–7, 3–6
Win	2–1	Nov 1978	Manila, Philippines	Clay	(United States) Sherwood Stewart	(Australia) Ross Case (Australia) Chris Kachel	6–3, 7–6
Loss	2–2	Mar 1979	Washington Indoor, U.S.	Carpet	(Australia) Bob Carmichael	(United States) Robert Lutz (United States) Stan Smith	4–6, 5–7, 6–3, 6–7
Loss	2–3	Apr 1979	Stuttgart Indoor, West Germany	Hard (i)	(Australia) Bob Carmichael	(Poland) Wojciech Fibak (Netherlands) Tom Okker	3–6, 7–5, 6–7
Win	3–3	Mar 1980	Washington-2, U.S.	Carpet	(United States) Ferdi Taygan	(South Africa) Kevin Curren (United States) Steve Denton	4–6, 6–3, 7–6
Loss	3–4	Mar 1980	Rotterdam, Netherlands	Carpet	(United States) Bill Scanlon	(India) Vijay Amritraj (United States) Stan Smith	4–6, 3–6
Win	4–4	Apr 1980	Los Angeles, U.S.	Hard	(United States) Butch Walts	(India) Anand Amritraj (United States) John Austin	6–2, 6–4
Win	5–4	Aug 1980	Toronto, Canada	Hard	(United States) Bruce Manson	(Switzerland) Heinz Günthardt (United States) Sandy Mayer	6–3, 3–6, 6–4
Win	6–4	Aug 1980	Cincinnati, U.S.	Hard	(United States) Bruce Manson	(Poland) Wojciech Fibak (Czechoslovakia) Ivan Lendl	6–7, 7–5, 6–4
Loss	6–5	Nov 1980	Hong Kong	Hard	(United States) Bruce Manson	(United States) Peter Fleming (United States) Ferdi Taygan	5–7, 2–6
Win	7–5	Nov 1980	Taipei, Taiwan	Carpet	(United States) Bruce Manson	(United States) John Austin (United States) Ferdi Taygan	6–4, 6–0
Win	8–5	Nov 1980	Bangkok, Thailand	Carpet	(United States) Ferdi Taygan	(Netherlands) Tom Okker (United States) Dick Stockton	7–6, 7–6
Win	9–5	Feb 1981	La Quinta, U.S.	Hard	(United States) Bruce Manson	(United States) Terry Moor (United States) Eliot Teltscher	7–6, 6–2
Win	10–5	Apr 1981	Frankfurt, West Germany	Carpet	(United States) Butch Walts	(United States) Vitas Gerulaitis (United States) John McEnroe	7–5, 6–7, 7–5
Win	11–5	Jun 1981	London/Queen's Club, U.K.	Grass	(United States) Pat DuPré	(South Africa) Kevin Curren (United States) Steve Denton	3–6, 7–6, 11–9
Win	12–5	Aug 1981	Columbus, U.S.	Hard	(United States) Bruce Manson	(India) Anand Amritraj (India) Vijay Amritraj	6–1, 6–1
Loss	12–6	Apr 1982	Los Angeles, U.S.	Hard	(United States) Bruce Manson	(United States) Sherwood Stewart (United States) Ferdi Taygan	1–6, 7–6, 3–6
Win	13–6	Jul 1982	Stuttgart Outdoor, West Germany	Clay	(Australia) Mark Edmondson	(West Germany) Andreas Maurer (West Germany) Wolfgang Popp	6–3, 6–1
Win	14–6	Sep 1982	San Francisco, U.S.	Carpet	(United States) Fritz Buehning	(United States) Marty Davis (United States) Chris Dunk	6–7, 6–2, 7–5
Loss	14–7	Feb 1983	Richmond, Virginia, U.S.	Carpet	(United States) Fritz Buehning	(Czechoslovakia) Pavel Složil (Czechoslovakia) Tomáš Šmíd	2–6, 4–6
Win	15–7	Aug 1983	Columbus, U.S.	Hard	(United States) Scott Davis	(India) Anand Amritraj (Australia) John Fitzgerald	6–1, 4–6, 7–6
Win	16–7	Nov 1983	Johannesburg, South Africa	Hard	(United States) Steve Meister	(Ecuador) Andrés Gómez (United States) Sherwood Stewart	6–7, 7–6, 6–2

== Grand Slam tournament performance timeline ==
Key
W	F	SF	QF	#R	RR	Q#	DNQ	A	NH

(W) winner; (F) finalist; (SF) semifinalist; (QF) quarterfinalist; (#R) rounds 4, 3, 2, 1; (RR) round-robin stage; (Q#) qualification round; (DNQ) did not qualify; (A) absent; (NH) not held; (SR) strike rate (events won / competed); (W–L) win–loss record.

Tournament	1972	1973	1974	1975	1976	1977		1978	1979	1980	1981	1982	1983	1984	1985	1986	1987	SR	W–L	Win %
Australian Open	A	A	A	A	A	1R	1R	A	A	W	A	QF	3R	A	3R	NH	A	1 / 6	12–5	70.6
French Open	A	A	A	A	A	2R		3R	2R	A	A	A	A	A	A	A	A	0 / 3	4–3	57.1
Wimbledon	A	A	A	A	2R	1R		2R	4R	3R	2R	QF	3R	1R	1R	2R	Q2	0 / 11	15–11	57.7
US Open	PR*	2R	3R	1R	1R	2R		4R	1R	4R	2R	2R	1R	1R	3R	1R	A	0 / 15	14–15	48.3
Win–loss	0–1	1–1	2–1	0–1	1–2	2–5		6–3	4–3	11–2	2–2	9–3	3–3	0–2	3–3	1–2	0–0	1 / 35	45–34	57.0

- The 1972 US Open had a preliminary round before the 128 player draw began.

== See also ==
- List of select Jewish tennis players
- List of Grand Slam men's singles champions
- 1980 Australian Open – Men's singles (The tournament draw detailing his Grand Slam championship path)
