= Glenn Wilson (tennis) =

New Zealand tennis player

- Full name: Glenn Wilson
- Country (sports): New Zealand
- Born: 17 August 1967 (age 59)
- Prize money: $27,226

Singles
- Career record: 0–1
- Career titles: 0
- Highest ranking: No. 599 (6 March 1995)

Doubles
- Career record: 2–9
- Career titles: 0
- Highest ranking: No. 160 (5 August 1996)

Glenn Wilson (born 17 August 1967) is a former professional tennis player from New Zealand.

== Biography ==
Wilson is originally from the small farming town of Rai Valley in Marlborough. He and his brother would practice on a floodlit asphalt court their parents had installed on their property. In 1987 he went to Iowa State University and played collegiate tennis for three and a half years.

He began playing professionally in the early 1990s and eventually specialised in doubles, in which he reached 160 in the world. His only main draw appearance as a singles player came at the 1994 Tel Aviv Open, where he made it through qualifying, before losing to Andrei Cherkasov in the first round. He had his best year on the doubles circuit in 1995 when he won the Prostějov Challenger with Andrei Pavel and reached the quarter-finals at the ATP Auckland Open, which was one of four main draw appearances he made in that tournament.

In 1997 he represented New Zealand in a Davis Cup tie against Indonesia in Jakarta. Wilson, aged 29, debuted in the reverse singles, a dead rubber which he won in straight sets over Suwandi Suwandi. This remained his only Davis Cup court appearance. From 2000 to 2003 he acted as non playing captain of New Zealand's Davis Cup team.

== Challenger titles ==
=== Doubles: (1) ===
No.	Year	Tournament	Surface	Partner	Opponents	Score
1.	1995	Prostějov, Czech Republic	Clay	(Romania) Andrei Pavel	(United States) Jeff Belloli (United States) Jack Waite	7–5, 6–3

== See also ==
- List of New Zealand Davis Cup team representatives
