= 1992 Tel Aviv Open – Singles =

Singles
- 1992 Tel Aviv Open

Final
- Champion: (United States) Jeff Tarango
- Runner-up: (France) Stéphane Simian
- Score: 4–6, 6–3, 6–4

Details
- Draw: 32
- Seeds: 8

Events
Singles	Doubles
- Tel Aviv Open

Leonardo Lavalle was the defending champion, but did not participate this year.

Jeff Tarango won the tournament, beating Stéphane Simian in the final, 4–6, 6–3, 6–4.

== Seeds ==
1. (Austria) Thomas Muster (semifinals)
2. (United States) Brad Gilbert (second round)
3. (Israel) Amos Mansdorf (quarterfinals)
4. (Commonwealth of Independent States) Andrei Chesnokov (first round)
5. (United States) Jeff Tarango (champion)
6. N/A
7. (United States) Jimmy Connors (second round)
8. (Italy) Gianluca Pozzi (first round)

== Draw ==
Key

- Q = Qualifier
- WC = Wild card
- LL = Lucky loser
- Alt = Alternate
- ITF = ITF entry
- PR = Protected ranking
- SR = Special ranking
- SE = Special exempt
- JE = Junior exempt
- JR = Junior Accelerator Programme entrant
- CO = College Accelerator Programme entrant
- NG = Next Gen Accelerator Program entrant
- w/o = Walkover
- r = Retired
- d = Defaulted

=== Finals ===
Semifinals
1	(Austria) Thomas Muster	2	4
5	(United States) Jeff Tarango	6	6
(Portugal) João Cunha e Silva	6^{7}	4
(France) Stéphane Simian	7^{9}	6

Final
5	(United States) Jeff Tarango	4	6	6
(France) Stéphane Simian	6	3	4

=== Top half ===
First round
1	(Austria) T Muster	6	6
Q	(Israel) S Perkiss	4	4
(Czechoslovakia) D Rikl	3	1
(Belgium) X Daufresne	6	6
(Israel) G Bloom	6	6
(Spain) À Corretja	4	0
Q	(Sweden) J Carlsson	2	6	3
7	(United States) J Connors	6	4	6
3	(Israel) A Mansdorf	6	6
(France) F Fontang	2	3
(Spain) A Berasategui	6	4	6^{4}
(Sweden) L Jonsson	3	6	7^{7}
WC	(Argentina) M Jaite	6	1	6
(Uruguay) D Pérez	3	6	3
WC	(Israel) E Ran	3	3
5	(United States) J Tarango	6	6

Second round
1	(Austria) T Muster	7	6
(Belgium) X Daufresne	5	4
(Israel) G Bloom	6	4	7
7	(United States) J Connors	4	6	5
3	(Israel) A Mansdorf	6	6
(Sweden) L Jonsson	3	2
WC	(Argentina) M Jaite	5	5
5	(United States) J Tarango	7	7

Quarterfinals
1	(Austria) T Muster	0	6	6
(Israel) G Bloom	6	2	4
3	(Israel) A Mansdorf	1	6	6^{4}
5	(United States) J Tarango	6	3	7^{7}

Semifinals
1	(Austria) T Muster	2	4
5	(United States) J Tarango	6	6

=== Bottom half ===
First round
LL	(United States) B Devening	5	6	5
(Portugal) J Cunha e Silva	7	4	7
(Netherlands) M Koevermans	3	7^{7}	4
(France) T Guardiola	6	6^{3}	1^{r}
Q	(Israel) Gil Kovalski	2	0
(United States) R Matuszewski	6	6
(Spain) MA Gorriz	7^{7}	3	7^{7}
4	(Commonwealth of Independent States) A Chesnokov	6^{5}	6	6^{3}
8	(Italy) G Pozzi	1	4
(South Africa) M Ondruska	6	6
(Austria) G Schaller	6	6
(Commonwealth of Independent States) V Gabrichidze	3	1
(France) S Simian	7^{7}	6
(Sweden) D Engel	6^{3}	2
Q	(India) R Krishnan	4	5
2	(United States) B Gilbert	6	7

Second round
(Portugal) J Cunha e Silva	5	7^{7}	6
(Netherlands) M Koevermans	7	6^{5}	2
(United States) R Matuszewski	6^{5}	6	7
(Spain) MA Gorriz	7^{7}	4	5
(South Africa) M Ondruska	6	6
(Austria) G Schaller	3	0
(France) S Simian	7	6
2	(United States) B Gilbert	5	2

Quarterfinals
(Portugal) J Cunha e Silva	6	7
(United States) R Matuszewski	4	5
(South Africa) M Ondruska	6	2	3
(France) S Simian	2	6	6

Semifinals
(Portugal) J Cunha e Silva	6^{7}	4
(France) S Simian	7^{9}	6
