= 1994 Tel Aviv Open =

- Date: October 10–17
- Edition: 15th
- Category: World Series
- Draw: 32S / 16D
- Prize money: $250,000
- Surface: Hard / outdoor
- Location: Ramat HaSharon, Tel Aviv District, Israel
- Venue: Israel Tennis Centers

Champions

Singles
- (South Africa) Wayne Ferreira

Doubles
- (South Africa) Lan Bale / (South Africa) John-Laffnie de Jager
← 1993 ·	Tel Aviv Open	· 1995 →

The 1994 Tel Aviv Open was a men's tennis tournament played on hard courts that was part of the World Series of the 1994 ATP Tour. It was played at the Israel Tennis Centers in the Tel Aviv District city of Ramat HaSharon, Israel from October 10 through October 17, 1994. First-seeded Wayne Ferreira won the singles title.

== Finals ==
=== Singles ===
(South Africa) Wayne Ferreira defeated (Israel) Amos Mansdorf 7–6^{(7–4)}, 6–3

- It was Ferreira's 5th title of the year and the 11th of his career.

=== Doubles ===
(South Africa) Lan Bale / (South Africa) John-Laffnie de Jager defeated (Sweden) Jan Apell / (Sweden) Jonas Björkman 6–7, 6–2, 7–6

- It was Bale's 2nd title of the year and the 3rd of his career. It was de Jager's only title of the year and the 2nd of his career.
