= John Benson (tennis) =

American tennis player

- Country (sports): United States
- Born: July 2, 1959 (age 65)

Singles
- Career record: 2–8
- Career titles: 0
- Highest ranking: No. 279 (December 26, 1979)

Grand Slam singles results
- US Open: 1R (1980, 1981)

Doubles
- Career record: 29–26
- Career titles: 3
- Highest ranking: No. 52 (January 4, 1982)

Grand Slam doubles results
- Wimbledon: 1R (1983)
- US Open: 3R (1981)

John Benson (born July 2, 1959) is a former professional tennis player from the United States.

Benson enjoyed most of his tennis success while playing doubles. During his career, he won 3 doubles titles. He achieved a career-high doubles ranking of No. 52 in 1982.

== Career finals ==
=== Doubles (3 wins) ===
Result	W/L	Date	Tournament	Surface	Partners	Opponents	Score
Win	1–0	Nov 1981	Taipei, Taiwan	Carpet	(United States) Mike Bauer	(United States) John Austin (United States) Mike Cahill	6–4, 6–3
Win	2–0	Nov 1981	Manila, Philippines	Clay	(United States) Mike Bauer	(United States) Drew Gitlin (United States) Jim Gurfein	6–4, 6–4
Win	3–0	Nov 1982	Bangkok, Thailand	Carpet	(United States) Mike Bauer	(United States) Charles Strode (United States) Morris Strode	7–5, 3–6, 6–3
