= Jim Gurfein =

American tennis player (born 1961)

- Country (sports): USA
- Born: January 4, 1961 (age 65) New York City, New York, U.S.
- Height: 5 ft 9 in (1.75 m)
- Plays: Left-handed

Singles
- Career record: 39–64
- Career titles: 0
- Highest ranking: No. 96 (September 12, 1983)

Grand Slam singles results
- Australian Open: 2R (1981, 1983)
- French Open: 2R (1983)
- Wimbledon: 1R (1984)
- US Open: 1R (1981, 1982, 1983, 1984, 1987)

Doubles
- Career record: 34–52
- Career titles: 1
- Highest ranking: No. 100 (June 25, 1984)

Jim Gurfein (born January 4, 1961) is a former professional tennis player from the U.S. Gurfein reached a career-high singles ranking of world No. 96 in September 1983.

== Early years ==
Gurfein was born in New York City, and he is Jewish. Gurfein grew up in Great Neck, New York. He attended Great Neck North High School and Stanford University. While on tour, Gurfein kept a residence in Atlanta, Georgia.

== Tennis career ==
Gurfein was runner-up of the 1981 NCAA singles tennis championship, falling to Stanford University teammate Tim Mayotte, and was an All American that year with teammates Mayotte, Scott Bondurant, and Scott Davis. He was a member of the U.S. Junior Davis Cup team in 1981.

In 1982, he won a doubles title in Cairo with Drew Gitlin. In July 1983, the 22-year-old Gurfein defeated world #22 Henri Leconte of France in a tournament in North Conway, New Hampshire and upset world #34 Christophe Roger-Vasselin in the Swedish Open in Båstad, Sweden.

Gurfein reached a career-high singles ranking of #96 in September 1983. He won one doubles title and reached his high doubles ranking of #100 in June 1984.

In 1984, he won the USTA Hawaiian Satellite tournament. In 1988, he defeated world #31 Michiel Schapers of the Netherlands in straight sets in a tournament in Key Biscayne, Florida and was a doubles winner in Seattle with Buff Farrow).

In 1986, Gurfein was participating in a tennis tour in Nigeria when, following a Bible study with fellow tennis pros Bud Cox and Morris Strode, Gurfein jumped through a hotel window while shouting "Jesus!" He suffered cuts and bruises and the three players were sent home from the tour. According to officials, Gurfein, Cox and Strode said that they had seen God, tore up their passports, cash and other possessions and threw them out of a seventh-floor window. Fellow tennis pro Bobby Banck said that the three men had twice broken into his hotel room in the middle of the night to urge him to "give up tennis and find the Lord." Banck had to call hotel security to remove the players from his room.

== Career finals ==
=== Singles (1 loss) ===
| Result | W/L | Date | Tournament | Surface | Opponent | Score |
|---|---|---|---|---|---|---|
| Loss | 0–1 | Nov 1982 | Bangkok, Thailand | Carpet (i) | (United States) Mike Bauer | 1–6, 2–6 |

=== Doubles (1 win, 3 losses) ===
| Result | W/L | Date | Tournament | Surface | Partner | Opponents | Score |
|---|---|---|---|---|---|---|---|
| Loss | 0–1 | Sep 1981 | Bordeaux, France | Clay | (Sweden) Anders Järryd | (Ecuador) Andrés Gómez (Chile) Belus Prajoux | 5–7, 3–6 |
| Loss | 0–2 | Nov 1981 | Manila, Philippines | Clay | (United States) Drew Gitlin | (United States) Mike Bauer (United States) John Benson | 4–6, 4–6 |
| Win | 1–2 | Feb 1982 | Cairo, Egypt | Clay | (United States) Drew Gitlin | (Switzerland) Heinz Günthardt (Switzerland) Markus Günthardt | 6–4, 7–5 |
| Loss | 0–3 | Oct 1983 | Barcelona, Spain | Clay | (United States) Erick Iskersky | (Sweden) Anders Järryd (Sweden) Hans Simonsson | 5–7, 3–6 |

== See also ==
- List of select Jewish tennis players
