= Robert Van't Hof =

American tennis player

- Full name: Robert Van't Hof
- Country (sports): United States
- Residence: Newport Beach, California, U.S.
- Born: April 10, 1959 (age 67) Lynwood, California, U.S.
- Height: 1.92 m (6 ft 3 in)
- Turned pro: 1980
- Plays: Right-handed (one-handed backhand)
- Prize money: $495,947

Singles
- Career record: 83–105 (44.15%)
- Career titles: 2
- Highest ranking: No. 25 (July 4, 1983)

Grand Slam singles results
- Australian Open: 3R (1981)
- Wimbledon: 4R (1983)
- US Open: 2R (1980, 1982)

Doubles
- Career record: 170–171 (49.85%)
- Career titles: 6
- Highest ranking: No. 20 (August 25, 1986)

Grand Slam doubles results
- Australian Open: QF (1990)
- French Open: 3R (1981)
- Wimbledon: 4R (1985, 1987)
- US Open: QF (1985)

Robert Van't Hof (born April 10, 1959) is a former professional tennis player from the United States.

== Early life ==
Van't Hof was born in Lynwood, California.

== Education ==
Van't Hof studied for three years at the University of Southern California, winning the National Collegiate Athletic Association singles title in 1980. He left the University without being awarded a degree, in order to pursue his tennis career.

Van't Hof was inducted into the Intercollegiate Tennis Association Hall of Fame in 2003.

== Professional career ==
Turning professional in 1980, Van't Hof won his first top-level singles title in 1981 at Taipei and his second in 1989 in Seoul. His best singles performance at a Grand Slam event came in 1983 at Wimbledon, where he reached the final 16.

Van't Hof won two top-level singles titles and six tour doubles titles, including the Pacific Southwest with Scott Davis in 1985, as an unseeded team. His career-high rankings were world no. 25 in singles (in 1983) and world no. 20 in doubles (in 1986). He retired from the professional tour in 1990.

== Coaching ==
After retiring as a player, Van't Hof worked as a coach to several players, including Lindsay Davenport, Todd Martin, and Coco Vandeweghe.

== Career finals ==
=== Singles ===
Result	W/L	Date	Tournament	Surface	Opponent	Score
Loss	0–1	Jan 1980	Hobart, Australia	Hard	(Israel) Shlomo Glickstein	6–7, 4–6
Win	1–1	Nov 1981	Taipei, Taiwan	Carpet (i)	(United States) Pat DuPré	7–5, 6–2
Loss	1–2	Aug 1982	Cleveland, Ohio, U.S.	Hard	(United States) Sandy Mayer	5–7, 3–6
Win	2–2	Apr 1989	Seoul, South Korea	Hard	(Australia) Brad Drewett	7–5, 6–4

=== Doubles ===
Result	W/L	Date	Tournament	Surface	Partner	Opponents	Score
Loss	0–1	Oct 1981	Tokyo, Japan	Clay	(United States) Larry Stefanki	(Switzerland) Heinz Günthardt (Hungary) Balázs Taróczy	6–3, 2–6, 1–6
Loss	0–2	Jan 1982	Auckland, New Zealand	Hard	(United States) Larry Stefanki	(United Kingdom) Andrew Jarrett (United Kingdom) Jonathan Smith	5–7, 6–7
Win	1–2	Nov 1982	Taipei, Taiwan	Carpet (i)	(United States) Larry Stefanki	(United States) Fred McNair (United States) Tim Wilkison	6–3, 7–6
Win	2–2	Jun 1984	Bristol, England, U.K.	Grass	(United States) Larry Stefanki	(Australia) John Alexander (Australia) John Fitzgerald	6–4, 5–7, 9–7
Win	3–2	Sep 1985	Los Angeles, California, U.S.	Hard	(United States) Scott Davis	(United States) Paul Annacone (South Africa) Christo van Rensburg	6–3, 7–6
Win	4–2	Mar 1986	Atlanta, Georgia, U.S.	Carpet (i)	(United States) Andy Kohlberg	(South Africa) Christo Steyn (South Africa) Danie Visser	6–2, 6–3
Win	5–2	Jan 1990	Auckland, New Zealand	Hard	(United States) Kelly Jones	(Israel) Gilad Bloom (Netherlands) Paul Haarhuis	7–6, 6–0
Win	6–2	Feb 1990	San Francisco, California, U.S.	Carpet (i)	(United States) Kelly Jones	(United States) Glenn Layendecker (United States) Richey Reneberg	2–6, 7–6, 6–3
Loss	6–3	Apr 1991	Hong Kong, China	Hard	(Canada) Glenn Michibata	(United States) Patrick Galbraith (United States) Todd Witsken	2–6, 4–6
