= Ofer Sela =

Israeli tennis player

- Full name: Ofer Sela
- Native name: עופר סלע
- Country (sports): Israel
- Born: 22 July 1972 (age 52); Haifa, Israel
- Height: 6 ft 2 in (188 cm)
- Plays: Right-handed
- Prize money: $63,483

Singles
- Career record: 1–4
- Highest ranking: No. 236 (12 April 1999)

Doubles
- Career record: 1–4
- Highest ranking: No. 252 (16 August 1999)

Ofer Sela (Hebrew: עופר סלע; born 22 July 1972) is a former professional tennis player from Israel.

== Biography ==
Sela comes from Haifa and is the son of Romanian-Jewish immigrants. The eldest of four siblings, he is a brother of Dudi Sela, who he later helped coach. As a teenager he played basketball but instead went for a career in tennis and in 1990 began playing on the international circuit.

=== Tennis career ===
A right-handed player, Sela qualified for the singles main draw of the Tel Aviv Open on three occasions, with his best performance coming in 1993, when he beat Rodolphe Gilbert and took fourth-seed Javier Sanchez to three sets in a second-round loss.

His only other ATP Tour appearance came at the 1995 Hong Kong Open, also as a qualifier.
