= Pat DuPré =

American tennis player

Patrick Marie Du Pré
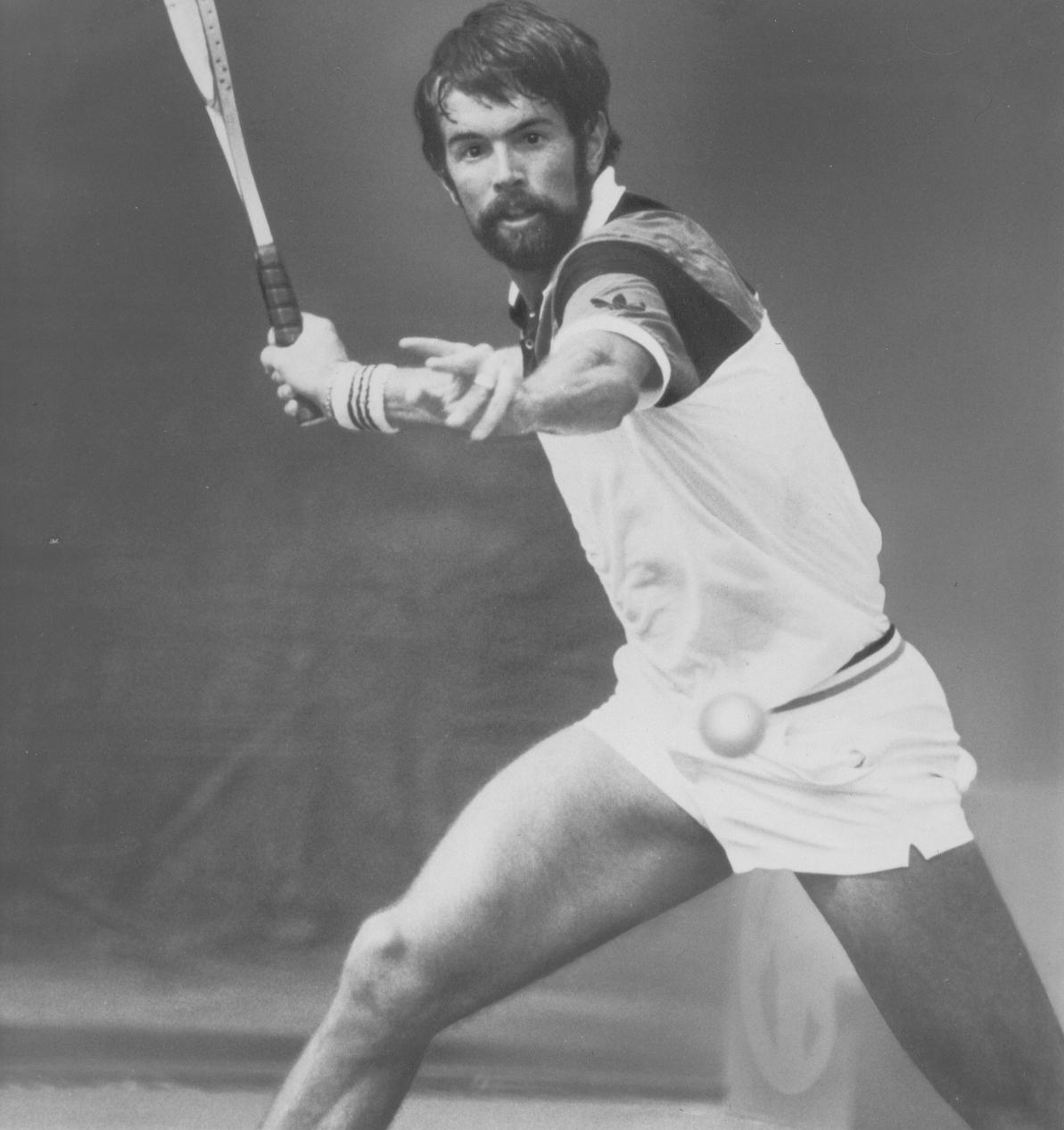
- Country (sports): United States
- Residence: Savannah, Georgia
- Born: September 16, 1954 (age 72) Liège, Belgium
- Height: 1.90 m (6 ft 3 in)
- Turned pro: 1972
- Retired: 1984
- Plays: Right-handed (one-handed backhand)
- Prize money: $533,743

Singles
- Career record: 178–196
- Career titles: 1
- Highest ranking: No. 14 (June 9, 1980)

Grand Slam singles results
- Australian Open: 4R (1980, 1981)
- French Open: 3R (1983)
- Wimbledon: SF (1979)
- US Open: QF (1979)

Doubles
- Career record: 121–144
- Career titles: 4
- Highest ranking: No. 30 (March 3, 1980)

Patrick Du Pré (French: [paʁtik dypʁe]; born September 16, 1954) is a former professional tennis player from the United States.

== Personal ==
While on tour, Du Pré resided in La Jolla, California. As of 2010 Du Pré and his wife Rhonda live in Savannah, Georgia.

Of the winning 1973 Stanford tennis team, Du Pré, Roscoe Tanner, and Sandy Mayer were members of the Zeta Psi fraternity.

== Tennis career ==
=== Juniors ===
While at Mountain Brook High School, he was a three-time Alabama state singles champion. In 1971, he was ranked second in the United States in the boys' 18 singles.

In 1972, Du Pré won the national junior singles championship and was top ranked in both singles and doubles nationally. He attended Stanford University and was an All-American for four years. In 1973 and 1974, Stanford won two National Collegiate Athletic Association national championships.

=== Pro tour ===
On the professional tour, Du Pré won one ATP Tour singles title (the Hong Kong Open in 1982) and four doubles titles. He was inducted into the Alabama Sports Hall of Fame in 1995 and was the first tennis player to be brought in.

Du Pré was a semifinalist at Wimbledon in 1979 and a quarter-finalist at the US Open. From 1979 through 1981, he was ranked in the top 20 in the world, reaching as high as No. 12 in June 1980.

== Career finals ==
=== Singles: 10 (1 title, 9 runner-ups) ===
Result	W/L	Date	Tournament	Surface	Opponent	Score
Loss	0–1	Feb 1978	Mexico City, Mexico	Carpet (i)	(Mexico) Raúl Ramírez	4–6, 1–6
Loss	0–2	May 1978	Tulsa, US	Hard	(United States) Eddie Dibbs	7–6, 2–6, 5–7
Loss	0–3	Oct 1978	Tokyo, Japan	Clay	(Italy) Adriano Panatta	3–6, 3–6
Loss	0–4	Nov 1978	Hong Kong, UK	Hard	(United States) Eliot Teltscher	4–6, 3–6, 2–6
Loss	0–5	Aug 1979	Lafayette, US	Carpet (i)	(United States) Marty Riessen	4–6, 7–5, 2–6
Loss	0–6	Oct 1979	Tokyo, Japan	Clay	(United States) Terry Moor	6–3, 6–7, 2–6
Loss	0–7	Nov 1979	Hong Kong, UK	Hard	(United States) Jimmy Connors	5–7, 3–6, 1–6
Loss	0–8	Nov 1979	Taipei, Taiwan	Carpet (i)	(United States) Bob Lutz	3–6, 4–6, 6–2, 3–6
Loss	0–9	Nov 1981	Taipei, Taiwan	Carpet (i)	(United States) Robert Van't Hof	5–7, 2–6
Win	1–9	Nov 1982	Hong Kong, UK	Hard	(United States) Morris Strode	6–3, 6–3

=== Doubles 9 (4 titles, 5 runner-ups) ===
Result	W/L	Date	Tournament	Surface	Partner	Opponents	Score
Loss	0–1	Mar 1977	Cairo, Egypt	Clay	(United Kingdom) Chris Lewis	(Australia) John Bartlett (Australia) John Marks	5–7, 1–6, 3–6
Win	1–1	Nov 1977	Taipei, Taiwan	Hard	(United States) Chris Delaney	(Australia) Steve Docherty (United States) Tom Gorman	7–6, 7–6
Loss	1–2	Nov 1978	Tokyo Indoor, Japan	Carpet (i)	(United States) Tom Gorman	(Australia) Ross Case (Australia) Geoff Masters	3–6, 4–6
Loss	1–3	Jun 1979	Surbiton, UK	Grass	(United States) Marty Riessen	(United States) Tim Gullikson (United States) Tom Gullikson	3–6, 7–6, 6–8
Win	2–3	Oct 1979	Tokyo Outdoor, Japan	Clay	(Australia) Colin Dibley	(Australia) Rod Frawley (Paraguay) Francisco González	3–6, 6–1, 6–1
Loss	2–4	Oct 1979	Sydney, Australia	Hard	(India) Vijay Amritraj	(Paraguay) Francisco González (Australia) Rod Frawley	walkover
Win	3–4	Nov 1979	Hong Kong	Hard	(United States) Bob Lutz	(United States) Steve Denton (United States) Mark Turpin	6–3, 6–4
Loss	3–5	Nov 1979	Taipei, Taiwan	Carpet (i)	(United States) Bob Lutz	(Australia) Mark Edmondson (Australia) John Marks	1–6, 6–3, 4–6
Win	4–5	Jun 1981	London/Queen's, UK	Grass	(United States) Brian Teacher	(South Africa) Kevin Curren (United States) Steve Denton	3–6, 7–6, 11–9
