= Drew Gitlin =

American tennis player

- Country (sports): USA
- Born: May 26, 1958 (age 67); Los Angeles, California, U.S.
- Height: 5 ft 10 in (1.78 m)
- Plays: Right-handed

Singles
- Career record: 34–48
- Career titles: 0
- Highest ranking: No. 65 (March 14, 1983)

Grand Slam singles results
- Australian Open: QF (1982)
- French Open: 3R (1983)
- Wimbledon: 3R (1982)
- US Open: 1R (1981, 1983)

Doubles
- Career record: 83–78
- Career titles: 3
- Highest ranking: No. 49 (May 22, 1985)

Drew Gitlin (born May 26, 1958) is a former professional tennis player from the United States.

As a qualifier, Gitlin reached the third round of the gentlemen's singles event at Wimbledon in 1982 where he lost to eventual champion Jimmy Connors. Gitlin reached a career high singles ranking of world No. 88 in January, 1983. During his career, he won three doubles titles and reached a doubles ranking of world No. 38 in April 1985.

Gitlin resided in Encino, California during his tour playing days.

== Career finals ==
=== Doubles (3 wins, 6 losses) ===
Result	W/L	Date	Tournament	Surface	Partner	Opponents	Score
Loss	0–1	Nov 1981	Manila, Philippines	Clay	(United States) Jim Gurfein	(United States) Mike Bauer (United States) John Benson	4–6, 4–6
Win	1–1	Feb 1982	Cairo, Egypt	Clay	(United States) Jim Gurfein	(Switzerland) Heinz Günthardt (Switzerland) Markus Günthardt	6–4, 7–5
Win	2–1	Jul 1982	Cap d'Agde WCT, France	Clay	(United States) Andy Andrews	(Czechoslovakia) Pavel Složil (Czechoslovakia) Tomáš Šmíd	6–2, 6–4
Loss	2–2	Sep 1982	Los Angeles-2 WCT, U.S.	Carpet	(United States) Andy Andrews	(South Africa) Kevin Curren (United States) Hank Pfister	6–4, 2–6, 5–7
Loss	2–3	Apr 1983	Tampa, U.S.	Carpet	(United States) Eric Fromm	(United States) Tony Giammalva (United States) Steve Meister	6–3, 1–6, 5–7
Loss	2–4	Jul 1983	North Conway, U.S.	Clay	(United States) Eric Fromm	(Australia) Mark Edmondson (United States) Sherwood Stewart	6–7, 1–6
Win	3–4	Nov 1983	Hong Kong	Hard	(Australia) Craig Miller	(United States) Sammy Giammalva Jr. (United States) Steve Meister	6–2, 6–2
Loss	3–5	Jul 1984	Washington D.C., U.S.	Clay	(United States) Blaine Willenborg	(Czechoslovakia) Pavel Složil (United States) Ferdi Taygan	6–7, 1–6
Loss	3–6	Nov 1984	Taipei, Taiwan	Carpet	(United States) Hank Pfister	(United States) Ken Flach (United States) Robert Seguso	1–6, 7–6, 2–6
