= Mike Bauer =

American tennis player

- Country (sports): United States
- Born: June 29, 1959 (age 66); Oakland, California, US
- Height: 1.88 m (6 ft 2 in)
- Plays: Right-handed
- Prize money: $ 611,891

Singles
- Career record: 75–92
- Career titles: 3
- Highest ranking: No. 29 (November 6, 1984)

Grand Slam singles results
- Australian Open: 3R (1982, 1984)
- French Open: 1R (1985)
- Wimbledon: 3R (1983)
- US Open: 2R (1984, 1984)

Doubles
- Career record: 162–180
- Career titles: 9
- Highest ranking: No. 25 (December 19, 1983)

Grand Slam doubles results
- Australian Open: QF (1983)
- French Open: 2R (1995)
- Wimbledon: QF (1983)
- US Open: QF (1984)

Mike Bauer (born June 29, 1959) is a retired American tour professional tennis player. Bauer won three singles and nine top-tier doubles titles during his career. He reached a career high singles ranking of world No. 29 in November 1984.

== Career ==
An All-American in 1981 at University of California, Berkeley, Bauer won the 1982 Bangkok Grand Prix and 1982 and 1983 South Australian Open. He was also a finalist at the 1983 Sydney Outdoor Grand Prix. He reached the semi-finals in five other tournaments during his career. His best Grand Slam result was reaching the 3rd round of Wimbledon in 1983 where he lost to eventual finalist Chris Lewis. He reached the second round of the U.S. Open twice in four tries.

Bauer reached a career high doubles ranking of world No. 25, and won the 1981 Taipei Grand Prix and Manila Grand Prix, and 1982 Bangkok Grand Prix, tournaments partnering compatriot John Benson, the 1983 Stuttgart Outdoor partnering Anand Amritraj and Sydney Outdoor partnering Pat Cash, the 1992 Tel Aviv Grand Prix partnering João Cunha e Silva, the 1993 Casablanca Grand Prix partnering Piet Norval, and Santiago Grand Prix with Rikl, and the 1994 Vienna Grand Prix again with Rikl. He was a finalist at the 1983 Maui Grand Prix partnering Scott Davis and 1984 Melbourne Grand Prix partnering Scott McCain, 1993 Zarazoga Grand Prix partnering David Rikl, Gerry Weber Open with Marc-Kevin Goellner, Tel Aviv partnering Rikl, and Vienna with David Prinosil.

Bauer was a member of the American Davis Cup team. Mike graduated from Miramonte High School in Orinda, California. He is the former Director of Tennis at Harbor Bay Club in Alameda, California. He regularly gave private lessons and directed the Summer Tennis Camp program. He now lives in Germany with his family.

== Grand Prix career finals ==
=== Singles (3 titles, 1 runner-up) ===
Result	W/L	Date	Tournament	Surface	Opponent	Score
Win	1–0	Nov 1982	Bangkok, Thailand	Carpet (i)	(United States) Jim Gurfein	6–1, 6–2
Win	2–0	Dec 1982	Adelaide, Australia	Grass	(Australia) Chris Johnstone	4–6, 7–6, 6–2
Loss	2–1	Dec 1983	Sydney, Australia	Grass	(Sweden) Joakim Nyström	6–2, 3–6, 1–6
Win	3–1	Dec 1983	Adelaide, Australia	Grass	(Czechoslovakia) Miloslav Mečíř	3–6, 6–4, 6–1

=== Doubles (9 titles, 6 runner-ups) ===
Result	W/L	Date	Tournament	Surface	Partners	Opponents	Score
Win	1–0	Nov 1981	Taipei, Taiwan	Carpet (i)	(United States) John Benson	(United States) John Austin (United States) Mike Cahill	6–4, 6–3
Win	2–0	Nov 1981	Manila, Philippines	Clay	(United States) John Benson	(United States) Drew Gitlin (United States) Jim Gurfein	6–4, 6–4
Win	3–0	Oct 1992	Tel Aviv, Israel	Hard	(Portugal) João Cunha e Silva	(Netherlands) Mark Koevermans (Sweden) Tobias Svantesson	6–3, 6–4
Win	4–0	Nov 1982	Bangkok, Thailand	Carpet (i)	(United States) John Benson	(United States) Charles Strode (United States) Morris Strode	7–5, 3–6, 6–3
Win	5–0	Jul 1983	Stuttgart, West Germany	Clay	(India) Anand Amritraj	(Czechoslovakia) Pavel Složil (Czechoslovakia) Tomáš Šmíd	4–6, 6–3, 6–2
Loss	5–1	Oct 1983	Maui, U.S.	Hard	(United States) Scott Davis	(United States) Tony Giammalva (United States) Steve Meister	3–6, 7–5, 4–6
Loss	5–2	Dec 1984	Melbourne, Australia	Grass	(United States) Scott McCain	(United States) Broderick Dyke (Australia) Wally Masur	6–7, 6–3, 6–7
Loss	5–3	Mar 1993	Zaragoza	Carpet	(Czech Republic) David Rikl	(Czech Republic) Martin Damm (Czech Republic) Karel Nováček	6–2, 4–6, 5–7
Win	6–3	Mar 1993	Casablanca, Morocco	Clay	(South Africa) Piet Norval	(Latvia) Ģirts Dzelde (Croatia) Goran Prpić	7–5, 7–6
Loss	6–4	Jun 1993	Halle, Germany	Grass	(Germany) Marc-Kevin Goellner	(Czechoslovakia) Petr Korda (Czech Republic) Cyril Suk	6–7, 7–5, 3–6
Loss	6–5	Oct 1993	Tel Aviv, Israel	Hard	(Czech Republic) David Rikl	(Spain) Sergio Casal (Spain) Emilio Sánchez	4–6, 4–6
Loss	6–6	Oct 1993	Vienna, Austria	Carpet (i)	(Germany) David Prinosil	(Zimbabwe) Byron Black (United States) Jonathan Stark	3–6, 6–7
Win	7–6	Nov 1993	Santiago, Chile	Clay	(Czech Republic) David Rikl	(Sweden) Christer Allgårdh (United States) Brian Devening	7–6, 6–4
Win	8–6	Dec 1983	Sydney, Australia	Grass	(Australia) Pat Cash	(Australia) Broderick Dyke (Australia) Rod Frawley	7–6, 6–4
Win	9–6	Oct 1994	Vienna, Austria	Carpet (i)	(Czech Republic) David Rikl	(Austria) Alex Antonitsch (United Kingdom) Greg Rusedski	7–6, 6–4
