= John Austin (tennis) =

American tennis player

- Country (sports): United States
- Born: July 31, 1957 (age 69) Long Beach, California
- Height: 6 ft 4 in (193 cm)
- Plays: Right-handed

Singles
- Career record: 50–83
- Highest ranking: No. 40 (August 10, 1981)

Grand Slam singles results
- Australian Open: 3R (1980)
- Wimbledon: 2R (1979, 1980)
- US Open: 2R (1979, 1981)

Doubles
- Career record: 85–96
- Career titles: 1
- Highest ranking: No. 52 (January 4, 1981)

Grand Slam doubles results
- Australian Open: 2R (1983)
- Wimbledon: 2R (1981)
- US Open: 2R (1977, 1979, 1980, 1981)

Grand Slam mixed doubles results
- Wimbledon: W (1980)
- US Open: 2R (1977)

John Austin (born July 31, 1957) is an American former professional tennis player born in Long Beach, California. He won the Wimbledon mixed doubles championship with his sister, Tracy Austin, in 1980, becoming the first brother and sister team to win a Grand Slam title together.

Austin reached a career high singles ranking of world No. 40. He is the brother of former professional tennis players Tracy, Pam, Jeff, and Doug Austin, and the brother-in-law of fitness expert Denise Austin.

According to a July 31, 2006 press release,

- He was the head pro of the Mulholland Tennis Club in Los Angeles
- He was the national NCAA doubles champ in 1978 while at UCLA
- He was a Davis Cup team member.

As of 2024, Austin resides in Scottsdale, AZ where he is the coach of the girls tennis team at Notre Dame Preparatory High School.

== Grand Slam finals ==
=== Mixed doubles: 2 (1 title, 1 runner–up) ===
Result	Year	Championship	Surface	Partner	Opponents	Score
Win	1980	Wimbledon	Grass	(United States) Tracy Austin	(Australia) Dianne Fromholtz (Australia) Mark Edmondson	4–6, 7–6^{(8–6)}, 6–3
Loss	1981	Wimbledon	Grass	(United States) Tracy Austin	(Netherlands) Betty Stöve (South Africa) Frew McMillan	6–4, 6–7^{(2–7)}, 3–6
