= Pacific Cup International =

Defunct tennis tournament
- Event name: Taipei Summit Open (1977); Taipei Championships (1978-79); Taipei International Championships (1980-84); Pacific Cup International (1992)
- Tour: Grand Prix (1977–1984); ATP Tour (1992)
- Founded: 1977, 1992
- Abolished: 1984, 1992
- Editions: 9
- Location: Taipei, Taiwan
- Surface: Carpet / indoor

The Pacific Cup International was a men's indoor carpet court tennis tournament founded in 1977 as the Taipei Summit Open. It was first part of the ITF Grand Prix Circuit. In 1978 its name was changed to the Taipei Championships until 1980 when it was rebranded as the Taipei International Championships until 1984 when it was discontinued. In 1992 the event resumed for one final season and was part of the ATP World Series of tournaments of the ATP Tour.

== Finals ==
=== Singles ===
| Year | Champions | Runners-up | Score |
|---|---|---|---|
| 1977 | (United States) Tim Gullikson | (Egypt) Ismail El Shafei | 6–7, 7–5, 7–6, 6–4 |
| 1978 | (United States) Brian Teacher | (United States) Tom Gorman | 6–3, 6–3, 6–3 |
| 1979 | (United States) Robert Lutz | (United States) Pat DuPré | 6–3, 6–4, 2–6, 6–3 |
| 1980 | (Czechoslovakia) Ivan Lendl | (United States) Brian Teacher | 6–7, 6–3, 6–3, 7–6 |
| 1981 | (United States) Robert Van't Hof | (United States) Pat DuPré | 7–5, 6–2 |
| 1982 | (United States) Brad Gilbert | (United States) Craig Wittus | 6–1, 6–4 |
| 1983 | (Nigeria) Nduka Odizor | (United States) Scott Davis | 6–4, 3–6, 6–4 |
| 1984 | (United States) Brad Gilbert | (Australia) Wally Masur | 6–3, 6–3 |
| 1985-91 | Not held | | |
| 1992 | (United States) Jim Grabb | (Australia) Jamie Morgan | 6–3, 6–3 |

=== Doubles ===
| Year | Champions | Runners-up | Score |
|---|---|---|---|
| 1977 | (United States) Chris Delaney (United States) Pat DuPré | (Australia) Steve Docherty (United States) Tom Gorman | 7–6, 7–6 |
| 1978 | (United States) Sherwood Stewart (United States) Butch Walts | (Australia) Mark Edmondson (Australia) John Marks | 6–2, 6–7, 7–6 |
| 1979 | (Australia) Mark Edmondson (Australia) John Marks | (United States) Pat DuPré (United States) Robert Lutz | 6–1, 3–6, 6–4 |
| 1980 | (United States) Bruce Manson (United States) Brian Teacher | (United States) John Austin (United States) Ferdi Taygan | 6–4, 6–0 |
| 1981 | (United States) Mike Bauer (United States) John Benson | (United States) John Austin (United States) Mike Cahill | 6–4, 6–3 |
| 1982 | (United States) Larry Stefanki (United States) Robert Van't Hof | (United States) Fred McNair (United States) Tim Wilkison | 6–3, 7–6 |
| 1983 | (Australia) Wally Masur (Australia) Kim Warwick | (United States) Ken Flach (United States) Robert Seguso | 7–6, 6–4 |
| 1984 | (United States) Ken Flach (United States) Robert Seguso | (United States) Drew Gitlin (United States) Hank Pfister | 6–1, 6–7, 6–2 |
| 1985-91 | Not held | | |
| 1992 | (Australia) John Fitzgerald (Australia) Sandon Stolle | (Germany) Patrick Baur (South Africa) Christo van Rensburg | 7–6, 6–2 |

== See also ==
- Taipei Women's Championships
- List of sporting events in Taiwan
