= 1982 Grand Prix (tennis) =

Tennis circuit

1982 Grand Prix circuit
Details
- Duration: January 4, 1982 – January 17, 1983
- Edition: 13th
- Tournaments: 70
- Categories: Grand Slam (4); Grand Prix (65); Team Events (1)

Achievements (singles)
- Most titles: (Czech Republic) Ivan Lendl (15)
- Most finals: (Czech Republic) Ivan Lendl (20)
- Prize money leader: (Czech Republic) Ivan Lendl
- Points leader: (United States) Jimmy Connors (3.355)

Awards
- Player of the year: (United States) Jimmy Connors
- Most improved player of the year: (Australia) Peter McNamara

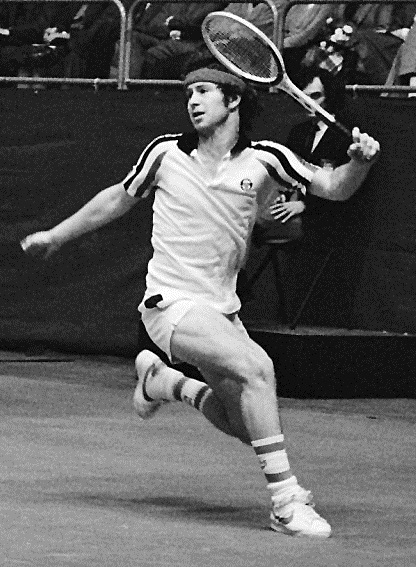
John McEnroe finished the year as ATP world No. 1 for the second time in his career. McEnroe won five titles during the season, also finishing runner-up at a major at the Wimbledon Championships.

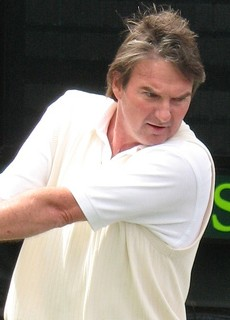
Jimmy Connors was the 1982 Grand Prix No. 1 and was named the ATP Player of the Year. Connors won seven titles during the season, including two majors at the Wimbledon Championships and the US Open.

The 1982 Volvo Grand Prix was a professional tennis circuit held that year. It incorporated the four grand slam tournaments, the Grand Prix tournaments. The circuit was administered by the Men's International Professional Tennis Council (MIPTC). On 30 April 1981 World Championship Tennis (WCT) announced its withdrawal from the Grand Prix circuit, which it had been incorporated into since 1978, and the re-establishment of its own tour calendar for the 1982 season. To counter the threat of player leaving the Grand Prix tour for the WCT the MIPTC introduced a mandatory commitment to play at least 10 Grand Prix Super Series tournaments.

== Schedule ==
The table below shows the 1982 Volvo Grand Prix schedule (a precursor to the ATP Tour).

Total prize money amount for all tournaments according to ATP.

Key

Grand Slam tournaments
Tour finals
Super Series
Regular Series

=== January ===
Week	Tournament	Champions	Runners-up	Semifinalists	Quarterfinalists
4 Jan	Adelaide, Australia; Grass – $75,000 – 32S/16D	(Australia) Rod Frawley; 2–6, 6–3, 6–2	(United States) Lloyd Bourne	(United States) Steve Krulevitz (Australia) John James	(Australia) Pat Cash (United States) Tim Mayotte (Australia) David Carter (Australia) Kim Warwick
4 Jan	Adelaide, Australia; Grass – $75,000 – 32S/16D	(Australia) Kim Warwick (Australia) Mark Edmondson; 7–5, 4–6, 7–6	(United Kingdom) Andrew Jarrett (United Kingdom) Jonathan Smith	(United States) Steve Krulevitz (Australia) John James	(Australia) Pat Cash (United States) Tim Mayotte (Australia) David Carter (Australia) Kim Warwick
11 Jan	Auckland, New Zealand; Hard – $75,000 – 32S/16D; Singles – Doubles	(United States) Tim Wilkison; 6–4, 6–4, 6–4	(New Zealand) Russell Simpson	(United States) Robert Van't Hof (United States) Chris Mayotte	(New Zealand) Chris Lewis (United States) Matt Mitchell (United States) Lloyd Bourne (United States) Larry Stefanki
11 Jan	Auckland, New Zealand; Hard – $75,000 – 32S/16D; Singles – Doubles	(United Kingdom) Jonathan Smith (United Kingdom) Andrew Jarrett; 7–5, 7–6	(United States) Larry Stefanki (United States) Robert Van't Hof	(United States) Robert Van't Hof (United States) Chris Mayotte	(New Zealand) Chris Lewis (United States) Matt Mitchell (United States) Lloyd Bourne (United States) Larry Stefanki
18 Jan	Guarujá, Brazil; Hard – $100,000 – 32S/16D	(United States) Van Winitsky; 6–3, 6–3	(Brazil) Carlos Kirmayr	(Italy) Claudio Panatta (Australia) Phil Dent	(Mexico) Raúl Ramírez (Brazil) Marcos Hocevar (Spain) Manuel Orantes (Sweden) Stefan Simonsson
18 Jan	Guarujá, Brazil; Hard – $100,000 – 32S/16D	(Australia) Kim Warwick (Australia) Phil Dent; 6–7, 6–2, 6–3	(Brazil) Carlos Kirmayr (Brazil) Cássio Motta	(Italy) Claudio Panatta (Australia) Phil Dent	(Mexico) Raúl Ramírez (Brazil) Marcos Hocevar (Spain) Manuel Orantes (Sweden) Stefan Simonsson
25 Jan	U.S. Pro Indoor, Philadelphia, Pennsylvania, US; Super Series; Carpet (i) – $300,000 – 32S/16D; Singles – Doubles	(United States) John McEnroe; 6–3, 6–3, 6–1	(United States) Jimmy Connors	(United States) Vitas Gerulaitis (United States) Chip Hooper	(United States) Sandy Mayer (South Africa) Kevin Curren (United States) John Sadri (Ecuador) Andrés Gómez
25 Jan	U.S. Pro Indoor, Philadelphia, Pennsylvania, US; Super Series; Carpet (i) – $300,000 – 32S/16D; Singles – Doubles	(United States) John McEnroe (United States) Peter Fleming; 7–6, 6–4	(United States) Sherwood Stewart (United States) Ferdi Taygan	(United States) Vitas Gerulaitis (United States) Chip Hooper	(United States) Sandy Mayer (South Africa) Kevin Curren (United States) John Sadri (Ecuador) Andrés Gómez
25 Jan	Viña del Mar, Chile; Clay – $75,000 – 32S/16D	(Chile) Pedro Rebolledo; 6–4, 3–6, 7–6	(Mexico) Raúl Ramírez	(Hungary) Zoltán Kuhárszky (Austria) Peter Feigl	(Sweden) Kjell Johansson (Chile) Jaime Fillol (France) Christophe Roger-Vasselin (Peru) Pablo Arraya
25 Jan	Viña del Mar, Chile; Clay – $75,000 – 32S/16D	(Mexico) Raúl Ramírez (Spain) Manuel Orantes; Walkover	(Argentina) Guillermo Aubone (Spain) Ángel Giménez	(Hungary) Zoltán Kuhárszky (Austria) Peter Feigl	(Sweden) Kjell Johansson (Chile) Jaime Fillol (France) Christophe Roger-Vasselin (Peru) Pablo Arraya

=== February ===
Week	Tournament	Champions	Runners-up	Semifinalists	Quarterfinalists
1 Feb	Buenos Aires Open; Buenos Aires, Argentina; Clay – $75,000 – 32S/16D; Singles	(Argentina) Guillermo Vilas; 6–2, 6–4	(Argentina) Alejandro Ganzábal	(Uruguay) Diego Pérez (France) Paul Torre	(Hungary) Zoltán Kuhárszky (Romania) Florin Segărceanu (Chile) Belus Prajoux (Austria) Peter Feigl
1 Feb	Buenos Aires Open; Buenos Aires, Argentina; Clay – $75,000 – 32S/16D; Singles	(Austria) Hans Kary (Hungary) Zoltán Kuhárszky; 7–5, 6–2	(Spain) Ángel Giménez (Spain) Manuel Orantes	(Uruguay) Diego Pérez (France) Paul Torre	(Hungary) Zoltán Kuhárszky (Romania) Florin Segărceanu (Chile) Belus Prajoux (Austria) Peter Feigl
1 Feb	United Bank Classic; Denver, Colorado, US; Super Series; Carpet (i) – $250,000 – 32S/16D	(United States) John Sadri; 4–6, 6–1, 6–4	(Ecuador) Andrés Gómez	(United States) Sandy Mayer (Australia) Kim Warwick	(South Africa) Kevin Curren (United States) Fritz Buehning (Poland) Wojciech Fibak (United States) Van Winitsky
1 Feb	United Bank Classic; Denver, Colorado, US; Super Series; Carpet (i) – $250,000 – 32S/16D	(United States) Steve Denton (South Africa) Kevin Curren; 6–4, 6–4	(Australia) Phil Dent (Australia) Kim Warwick	(United States) Sandy Mayer (Australia) Kim Warwick	(South Africa) Kevin Curren (United States) Fritz Buehning (Poland) Wojciech Fibak (United States) Van Winitsky
8 Feb	Caracas, Venezuela; Hard – $88,500 – 32S/16D	(Mexico) Raúl Ramírez; 4–6, 7–6, 6–3	(Hungary) Zoltán Kuhárszky	(United States) Eddie Dibbs (United States) Eric Fromm	(France) Christophe Roger-Vasselin (South Africa) Freddie Sauer (United States) Mike Brunnberg (United States) Dave Siegler
8 Feb	Caracas, Venezuela; Hard – $88,500 – 32S/16D	(United States) Craig Wittus (United States) Steve Meister; 6–7, 7–6, 6–4	(United States) Eric Fromm (United States) Cary Leeds	(United States) Eddie Dibbs (United States) Eric Fromm	(France) Christophe Roger-Vasselin (South Africa) Freddie Sauer (United States) Mike Brunnberg (United States) Dave Siegler
8 Feb	U.S. National Indoor Championships; Memphis, Tennessee, US; Super Series; Carpet (i) – $225,000 – 48S/24D	(South Africa) Johan Kriek; 6–3, 3–6, 6–4	(United States) John McEnroe	(United States) Gene Mayer (United Kingdom) Buster Mottram	(United States) Roscoe Tanner (South Africa) Kevin Curren (United States) Vitas Gerulaitis (United States) Eliot Teltscher
8 Feb	U.S. National Indoor Championships; Memphis, Tennessee, US; Super Series; Carpet (i) – $225,000 – 48S/24D	(United States) Steve Denton (South Africa) Kevin Curren; 7–6, 4–6, 6–2	(United States) Peter Fleming (United States) John McEnroe	(United States) Gene Mayer (United Kingdom) Buster Mottram	(United States) Roscoe Tanner (South Africa) Kevin Curren (United States) Vitas Gerulaitis (United States) Eliot Teltscher
15 Feb	Congoleum Classic; La Quinta, California, US; Super Series; Hard – $200,000 – 64S/32D; Singles – Doubles	(France) Yannick Noah; 3–6, 6–2, 7–5	(Czechoslovakia) Ivan Lendl	(Mexico) Raúl Ramírez (United States) Eliot Teltscher	(United States) Victor Amaya (United States) Roscoe Tanner (Australia) Phil Dent (United States) Harold Solomon
15 Feb	Congoleum Classic; La Quinta, California, US; Super Series; Hard – $200,000 – 64S/32D; Singles – Doubles	(Mexico) Raúl Ramírez (United States) Brian Gottfried; 6–4, 3–6, 6–2	(United Kingdom) John Lloyd (United States) Dick Stockton	(Mexico) Raúl Ramírez (United States) Eliot Teltscher	(United States) Victor Amaya (United States) Roscoe Tanner (Australia) Phil Dent (United States) Harold Solomon
22 Feb	Egyptian Open; Cairo, Egypt; Clay – $75,000 – 32S/16D	(Australia) Brad Drewett; 6–3, 6–3	(Italy) Claudio Panatta	(France) Georges Goven (France) Bernard Fritz	(Nigeria) Nduka Odizor (West Germany) Klaus Eberhard (Austria) Peter Feigl (Hungary) Zoltán Kuhárszky
22 Feb	Egyptian Open; Cairo, Egypt; Clay – $75,000 – 32S/16D	(United States) Jim Gurfein (United States) Drew Gitlin; 6–4, 7–5	(Switzerland) Heinz Günthardt (Switzerland) Markus Günthardt	(France) Georges Goven (France) Bernard Fritz	(Nigeria) Nduka Odizor (West Germany) Klaus Eberhard (Austria) Peter Feigl (Hungary) Zoltán Kuhárszky
22 Feb	Monterrey Cup; Monterrey, Mexico; Super Series; Carpet (i) – $300,000 – 32S/16D	(United States) Jimmy Connors; 6–2, 3–6, 6–3	(South Africa) Johan Kriek	(United States) Nick Saviano (United States) Fritz Buehning	(United States) Mel Purcell (United States) Dick Stockton (United States) Chip Hooper (United States) Gene Mayer
22 Feb	Monterrey Cup; Monterrey, Mexico; Super Series; Carpet (i) – $300,000 – 32S/16D	(United States) Hank Pfister (United States) Victor Amaya; 6–3, 6–7, 6–3	(United States) Tracy Delatte (United States) Mel Purcell	(United States) Nick Saviano (United States) Fritz Buehning	(United States) Mel Purcell (United States) Dick Stockton (United States) Chip Hooper (United States) Gene Mayer

=== March ===
Week	Tournament	Champions	Runners-up	Semifinalists	Quarterfinalists
1 Mar	Davis Cup First Round; Carlsbad, California, United States – hard Stockholm, Sweden – carpet (i); Mexico City, Mexico – clay Santiago, Chile – clay Christchurch, New Zealand – grass Rome, Italy – clay Prague, Czechoslovakia – carpet (i); Buenos Aires, Argentina – clay	First Round Winners; United States 4–1; Sweden 4–1; Australia 3–1; Chile 3–2; New Zealand 3–2; Italy 3–2; Czechoslovakia 5–0; France 3–2	First Round Losers; India; Soviet Union; Mexico; Romania; Spain; Great Britain; France; Argentina		
8 Mar	Brussels Indoor; Brussels, Belgium; Super Series; Carpet (i) – $250,000 – 32S/16D; Singles – Doubles	(United States) Vitas Gerulaitis; 4–6, 7–6, 6–2	(Sweden) Mats Wilander	(Israel) Shlomo Glickstein (United States) Jimmy Connors	(United States) John McEnroe (United States) Brian Teacher (United States) Tim Mayotte (United States) Fritz Buehning
8 Mar	Brussels Indoor; Brussels, Belgium; Super Series; Carpet (i) – $250,000 – 32S/16D; Singles – Doubles	(United States) Sherwood Stewart (Czechoslovakia) Pavel Složil; 6–4, 6–7, 7–5	(United States) Tracy Delatte (United States) Chris Dunk	(Israel) Shlomo Glickstein (United States) Jimmy Connors	(United States) John McEnroe (United States) Brian Teacher (United States) Tim Mayotte (United States) Fritz Buehning
8 Mar	Linz, Austria; Carpet (i) – $75,000 – 32S/16D	(Sweden) Anders Järryd; 6–4, 4–6, 6–4	(Spain) José Higueras	(Sweden) Henrik Sundström (West Germany) Klaus Eberhard	(West Germany) Hans-Dieter Beutel (Austria) Robert Reininger (Australia) Rod Frawley (Spain) Fernando Luna
8 Mar	Linz, Austria; Carpet (i) – $75,000 – 32S/16D	(Sweden) Hans Simonsson (Sweden) Anders Järryd; 6–2, 6–0	(Australia) Rod Frawley (Australia) Paul Kronk	(Sweden) Henrik Sundström (West Germany) Klaus Eberhard	(West Germany) Hans-Dieter Beutel (Austria) Robert Reininger (Australia) Rod Frawley (Spain) Fernando Luna
15 Mar	ABN World Tennis Tournament; Rotterdam, Netherlands; Super Series; Carpet (i) – $250,000 – 32S/16D; Singles	(Argentina) Guillermo Vilas; 0–6, 6–2, 6–4	(United States) Jimmy Connors	(United States) Brian Gottfried (United Kingdom) Buster Mottram	(Czechoslovakia) Tomáš Šmíd (United States) John Sadri (United States) Chip Hooper (Czechoslovakia) Pavel Složil
15 Mar	ABN World Tennis Tournament; Rotterdam, Netherlands; Super Series; Carpet (i) – $250,000 – 32S/16D; Singles	(United States) Sherwood Stewart (Australia) Mark Edmondson; 7–5, 6–2	(United States) Fritz Buehning (South Africa) Kevin Curren	(United States) Brian Gottfried (United Kingdom) Buster Mottram	(Czechoslovakia) Tomáš Šmíd (United States) John Sadri (United States) Chip Hooper (Czechoslovakia) Pavel Složil
15 Mar	Lorraine Open; Metz, France; Hard (i) – $75,000 – 32S/16D	(United States) Erick Iskersky; 6–4, 6–3	(United States) Steve Denton	(France) Christophe Roger-Vasselin (France) Henri Leconte	(France) Pascal Portes (South Africa) Schalk van der Merwe (Sweden) Jan Gunnarsson (United States) Peter Fleming
15 Mar	Lorraine Open; Metz, France; Hard (i) – $75,000 – 32S/16D	(Australia) Paul Kronk (Australia) David Carter; 6–3, 7–6	(United States) Matt Doyle (United States) Dave Siegler	(France) Christophe Roger-Vasselin (France) Henri Leconte	(France) Pascal Portes (South Africa) Schalk van der Merwe (Sweden) Jan Gunnarsson (United States) Peter Fleming
22 Mar	Cuore Cup; Milan, Italy; Super Series; Carpet (i) – $350,000 – 32S/16D	(Argentina) Guillermo Vilas; 6–3, 6–3	(United States) Jimmy Connors	(Australia) Peter McNamara (United States) Sandy Mayer	(Czechoslovakia) Tomáš Šmíd (United States) Vince Van Patten (United States) Brian Teacher (Australia) Mark Edmondson
22 Mar	Cuore Cup; Milan, Italy; Super Series; Carpet (i) – $350,000 – 32S/16D	(Australia) Peter McNamara (Switzerland) Heinz Günthardt; 7–6, 7–6	(Australia) Mark Edmondson (United States) Sherwood Stewart	(Australia) Peter McNamara (United States) Sandy Mayer	(Czechoslovakia) Tomáš Šmíd (United States) Vince Van Patten (United States) Brian Teacher (Australia) Mark Edmondson
29 Mar	Trevira Cup; Frankfurt, West Germany; Super Series; Carpet (i) – $250,000 – 32S/16D	(Czechoslovakia) Ivan Lendl; 6–2, 6–2	(Australia) Peter McNamara	(United States) Chip Hooper (United States) Brian Gottfried	(United States) Steve Denton (Czechoslovakia) Tomáš Šmíd (Australia) Rod Frawley (United States) Tim Mayotte
29 Mar	Trevira Cup; Frankfurt, West Germany; Super Series; Carpet (i) – $250,000 – 32S/16D	(Australia) Mark Edmondson (United States) Steve Denton; 6–7, 6–3, 6–3	(United States) Tony Giammalva (United States) Tim Mayotte	(United States) Chip Hooper (United States) Brian Gottfried	(United States) Steve Denton (Czechoslovakia) Tomáš Šmíd (Australia) Rod Frawley (United States) Tim Mayotte
29 Mar	Nice International Open; Nice, France; Clay – $75,000 – 32S/16D	(Hungary) Balázs Taróczy; 6–2, 3–6, 13–11	(France) Yannick Noah	(Spain) Fernando Luna (Italy) Claudio Panatta	(India) Ramesh Krishnan (Spain) Ángel Giménez (Spain) José García (Uruguay) José Luis Damiani
29 Mar	Nice International Open; Nice, France; Clay – $75,000 – 32S/16D	(France) Yannick Noah (France) Henri Leconte; 5–7, 6–4, 6–3	(Australia) Paul McNamee (Hungary) Balázs Taróczy	(Spain) Fernando Luna (Italy) Claudio Panatta	(India) Ramesh Krishnan (Spain) Ángel Giménez (Spain) José García (Uruguay) José Luis Damiani

=== April ===
Week	Tournament	Champions	Runners-up	Semifinalists	Quarterfinalists
5 Apr	Monte Carlo Open; Roquebrune-Cap-Martin, France; Super Series; Clay – $300,000 – 32S/16D; Singles – Doubles	(Argentina) Guillermo Vilas; 6–1, 7–6, 6–3	(Czechoslovakia) Ivan Lendl	(France) Yannick Noah (Argentina) José Luis Clerc	(Hungary) Balázs Taróczy (Sweden) Björn Borg (Spain) Manuel Orantes (Peru) Pablo Arraya
5 Apr	Monte Carlo Open; Roquebrune-Cap-Martin, France; Super Series; Clay – $300,000 – 32S/16D; Singles – Doubles	(Australia) Peter McNamara (Australia) Paul McNamee; 6–7, 7–6, 6–3	(Australia) Mark Edmondson (United States) Sherwood Stewart	(France) Yannick Noah (Argentina) José Luis Clerc	(Hungary) Balázs Taróczy (Sweden) Björn Borg (Spain) Manuel Orantes (Peru) Pablo Arraya
12 Apr	Pacific Southwest Open; Los Angeles, California, US; Super Series; Hard – $200,000 – 32S/16D	(United States) Jimmy Connors; 6–2, 6–1	(United States) Mel Purcell	(United States) Victor Amaya (United States) Brian Teacher	(United States) Tim Gullikson (United States) Marty Davis (United States) Gene Mayer (United States) Bruce Manson
12 Apr	Pacific Southwest Open; Los Angeles, California, US; Super Series; Hard – $200,000 – 32S/16D	(United States) Ferdi Taygan (United States) Sherwood Stewart; 6–1, 6–7, 6–3	(United States) Bruce Manson (United States) Brian Teacher	(United States) Victor Amaya (United States) Brian Teacher	(United States) Tim Gullikson (United States) Marty Davis (United States) Gene Mayer (United States) Bruce Manson
19 Apr	Alan King Tennis Classic, Las Vegas, Nevada, US; Super Series; Hard – $300,000 – 32S/16D	(United States) Jimmy Connors; 5–2, ret.	(United States) Gene Mayer	(United States) Sandy Mayer (Australia) Mark Edmondson	(United States) Steve Denton (United States) Brian Gottfried (South Africa) Johan Kriek (Mexico) Raúl Ramírez
19 Apr	Alan King Tennis Classic, Las Vegas, Nevada, US; Super Series; Hard – $300,000 – 32S/16D	(United States) Ferdi Taygan (United States) Sherwood Stewart; 7–6, 6–4	(Brazil) Carlos Kirmayr (United States) Van Winitsky	(United States) Sandy Mayer (Australia) Mark Edmondson	(United States) Steve Denton (United States) Brian Gottfried (South Africa) Johan Kriek (Mexico) Raúl Ramírez
19 Apr	Bournemouth, United Kingdom; Clay – $100,000 – 32S/16D	(Spain) Manuel Orantes; 6–2, 6–0	(Spain) Ángel Giménez	(Hungary) Balázs Taróczy (Uruguay) José Luis Damiani	(Spain) José Higueras (Peru) Pablo Arraya (France) Thierry Tulasne (Australia) Paul McNamee
19 Apr	Bournemouth, United Kingdom; Clay – $100,000 – 32S/16D	(United Kingdom) Buster Mottram (Australia) Paul McNamee; 3–6, 7–6, 6–3	(France) Henri Leconte (Romania) Ilie Năstase	(Hungary) Balázs Taróczy (Uruguay) José Luis Damiani	(Spain) José Higueras (Peru) Pablo Arraya (France) Thierry Tulasne (Australia) Paul McNamee
26 Apr	Madrid Tennis Grand Prix; Madrid, Spain; Super Series; Clay – $200,000 – 32S/16D	(Argentina) Guillermo Vilas; 6–7, 4–6, 6–0, 6–3, 6–3	(Czechoslovakia) Ivan Lendl	(Spain) Manuel Orantes (France) Yannick Noah	(Switzerland) Heinz Günthardt (France) Henri Leconte (Spain) José Higueras (Sweden) Mats Wilander
26 Apr	Madrid Tennis Grand Prix; Madrid, Spain; Super Series; Clay – $200,000 – 32S/16D	(Czechoslovakia) Tomáš Šmíd (Czechoslovakia) Pavel Složil; 6–1, 3–6, 9–7	(Switzerland) Heinz Günthardt (Hungary) Balázs Taróczy	(Spain) Manuel Orantes (France) Yannick Noah	(Switzerland) Heinz Günthardt (France) Henri Leconte (Spain) José Higueras (Sweden) Mats Wilander
26 Apr	Robinson's Tennis Open; Tampa, Florida, US; Hard – $75,000 – 32S/16D	(United States) Brian Gottfried; 6–7^{(6–8)}, 6–2, 6–4	(United States) Mike Estep	(United States) Harold Solomon (United States) Peter Rennert	(United States) Tim Gullikson (United States) Mel Purcell (United States) Tim Mayotte (United States) Roscoe Tanner
26 Apr	Robinson's Tennis Open; Tampa, Florida, US; Hard – $75,000 – 32S/16D	(United States) Tom Gullikson (United States) Tim Gullikson; 6–2, 6–3	(United States) Brian Gottfried (United States) Hank Pfister	(United States) Harold Solomon (United States) Peter Rennert	(United States) Tim Gullikson (United States) Mel Purcell (United States) Tim Mayotte (United States) Roscoe Tanner

=== May ===
Week	Tournament	Champions	Runners-up	Semifinalists	Quarterfinalists
3 May	World Team Cup; Düsseldorf, West Germany; Clay – $450,000 – 16S/8D	United States; 2–0	Australia	Argentina; Spain	Sweden; Italy; West Germany; France
10 May	Florence Open; Florence, Italy; Clay – $75,000 – 32S/16D	(United States) Vitas Gerulaitis; 4–6, 6–3, 6–1	(Sweden) Stefan Simonsson	(Socialist Federal Republic of Yugoslavia) Marko Ostoja (Italy) Gianluca Rinaldini	(Argentina) José Luis Clerc (France) Pascal Portes (Spain) Sergio Casal (Spain) Juan Avendaño
10 May	Florence Open; Florence, Italy; Clay – $75,000 – 32S/16D	(Italy) Adriano Panatta (Italy) Paolo Bertolucci; 7–6, 6–1	(United States) Tony Giammalva (United States) Sammy Giammalva	(Socialist Federal Republic of Yugoslavia) Marko Ostoja (Italy) Gianluca Rinaldini	(Argentina) José Luis Clerc (France) Pascal Portes (Spain) Sergio Casal (Spain) Juan Avendaño
10 May	German Open Championships; Hamburg, West Germany; Super Series; Clay – $250,000 – 64S/32D; Singles – Doubles	(Spain) José Higueras; 4–6, 6–7, 7–6, 6–3, 7–6	(Australia) Peter McNamara	(Ecuador) Andrés Gómez (United States) Sandy Mayer	(United States) Jimmy Connors (United Kingdom) Buster Mottram (Czechoslovakia) Tomáš Šmíd (Sweden) Mats Wilander
10 May	German Open Championships; Hamburg, West Germany; Super Series; Clay – $250,000 – 64S/32D; Singles – Doubles	(Czechoslovakia) Tomáš Šmíd (Czechoslovakia) Pavel Složil; 6–4, 6–3	(Sweden) Anders Järryd (Sweden) Hans Simonsson	(Ecuador) Andrés Gómez (United States) Sandy Mayer	(United States) Jimmy Connors (United Kingdom) Buster Mottram (Czechoslovakia) Tomáš Šmíd (Sweden) Mats Wilander
17 May	Bavarian Tennis Championships; Munich, West Germany; Clay – $75,000 – 32S/16D; Singles – Doubles	(United States) Gene Mayer; 3–6, 6–3, 6–2, 6–1	(West Germany) Peter Elter	(West Germany) Damir Keretić (Spain) José García Requena	(Israel) Shlomo Glickstein (United States) Chip Hooper (France) Christophe Roger-Vasselin (Spain) José López-Maeso
17 May	Bavarian Tennis Championships; Munich, West Germany; Clay – $75,000 – 32S/16D; Singles – Doubles	(United States) Mel Purcell (United States) Chip Hooper; 6–4, 7–6	(South Africa) Tian Viljoen (South Africa) Danie Visser	(West Germany) Damir Keretić (Spain) José García Requena	(Israel) Shlomo Glickstein (United States) Chip Hooper (France) Christophe Roger-Vasselin (Spain) José López-Maeso
17 May	Italian Open; Rome, Italy; Super Series; Clay – $300,000 – 64S/32D	(Ecuador) Andrés Gómez; 6–2, 6–3, 6–2	(United States) Eliot Teltscher	(Sweden) Mats Wilander (Peru) Pablo Arraya	(Czechoslovakia) Tomáš Šmíd (Spain) José Higueras (United States) Eddie Dibbs (Poland) Wojciech Fibak
17 May	Italian Open; Rome, Italy; Super Series; Clay – $300,000 – 64S/32D	(Hungary) Balázs Taróczy (Switzerland) Heinz Günthardt; 6–4, 4–6, 6–3	(Poland) Wojciech Fibak (Australia) John Fitzgerald	(Sweden) Mats Wilander (Peru) Pablo Arraya	(Czechoslovakia) Tomáš Šmíd (Spain) José Higueras (United States) Eddie Dibbs (Poland) Wojciech Fibak
24 May; 31 May	French Open; Paris, France; Grand Slam; Clay – $475,000 – 128S/64D/32XD; Singles – Doubles – Mixed doubles	(Sweden) Mats Wilander; 1–6, 7–6^{(8–6)}, 6–0, 6–4	(Argentina) Guillermo Vilas	(Spain) José Higueras (Argentina) José Luis Clerc	(United States) Jimmy Connors (France) Yannick Noah (Australia) Peter McNamara (United States) Vitas Gerulaitis
24 May; 31 May	French Open; Paris, France; Grand Slam; Clay – $475,000 – 128S/64D/32XD; Singles – Doubles – Mixed doubles	(United States) Sherwood Stewart (United States) Ferdi Taygan; 7–5, 6–3, 1–1, ret.	(Chile) Hans Gildemeister (Chile) Belus Prajoux	(Spain) José Higueras (Argentina) José Luis Clerc	(United States) Jimmy Connors (France) Yannick Noah (Australia) Peter McNamara (United States) Vitas Gerulaitis
24 May; 31 May	French Open; Paris, France; Grand Slam; Clay – $475,000 – 128S/64D/32XD; Singles – Doubles – Mixed doubles	(Australia) Wendy Turnbull (United Kingdom) John Lloyd; 6–2, 7–6^{(12–10)}	(Brazil) Cláudia Monteiro (Brazil) Cássio Motta	(Spain) José Higueras (Argentina) José Luis Clerc	(United States) Jimmy Connors (France) Yannick Noah (Australia) Peter McNamara (United States) Vitas Gerulaitis

=== June ===
Week	Tournament	Champions	Runners-up	Semifinalists	Quarterfinalists
7 Jun	Stella Artois Championships; London, England; Grass – $150,000 – 64S/32D; Singles – Doubles	(United States) Jimmy Connors; 7–5, 6–3	(United States) John McEnroe	(New Zealand) Chris Lewis (South Africa) Kevin Curren	(United States) Chip Hooper (United States) Fritz Buehning (United States) Brian Gottfried (Australia) Mark Edmondson
7 Jun	Stella Artois Championships; London, England; Grass – $150,000 – 64S/32D; Singles – Doubles	(United States) Peter Rennert (United States) John McEnroe; 7–6, 7–5	(United States) Victor Amaya (United States) Hank Pfister	(New Zealand) Chris Lewis (South Africa) Kevin Curren	(United States) Chip Hooper (United States) Fritz Buehning (United States) Brian Gottfried (Australia) Mark Edmondson
7 Jun	Venice, Italy; Clay – $75,000 – 32S/16D	(Argentina) José Luis Clerc; 7–6, 6–1	(Australia) Peter McNamara	(United States) Jimmy Brown (United States) Pender Murphy	(Argentina) Alejandro Ganzábal (United States) Steve Krulevitz (Romania) Florin Segărceanu (Chile) Alejandro Pierola
7 Jun	Venice, Italy; Clay – $75,000 – 32S/16D	(Brazil) Cássio Motta (Brazil) Carlos Kirmayr; 6–4, 6–2	(Argentina) José Luis Clerc (Romania) Ilie Năstase	(United States) Jimmy Brown (United States) Pender Murphy	(Argentina) Alejandro Ganzábal (United States) Steve Krulevitz (Romania) Florin Segărceanu (Chile) Alejandro Pierola
14 Jun	Bristol Open; Bristol, England; Grass – $100,000 – 32S/16D; Singles – Doubles	(Australia) John Alexander; 6–3, 6–4	(United States) Tim Mayotte	(New Zealand) Russell Simpson (United States) Marty Davis	(Spain) José López-Maeso (Brazil) João Soares (United Kingdom) Jonathan Smith (Republic of Ireland) Matt Doyle
14 Jun	Bristol Open; Bristol, England; Grass – $100,000 – 32S/16D; Singles – Doubles	(United States) Tom Gullikson (United States) Tim Gullikson; 6–4, 7–6	(Australia) Mark Edmondson (Australia) Kim Warwick	(New Zealand) Russell Simpson (United States) Marty Davis	(Spain) José López-Maeso (Brazil) João Soares (United Kingdom) Jonathan Smith (Republic of Ireland) Matt Doyle
21 Jun; 28 Jun	Wimbledon; London, England; Grand Slam; Grass – $539,167 – S128/D64/48XD; Singles – Doubles – Mixed doubles	(United States) Jimmy Connors; 3–6, 6–3, 6–7^{(2–7)}, 7–6^{(7–5)}, 6–4	(United States) John McEnroe	(United States) Tim Mayotte (Australia) Mark Edmondson	(South Africa) Johan Kriek (United States) Brian Teacher (United States) Vitas Gerulaitis (United States) Gene Mayer
21 Jun; 28 Jun	Wimbledon; London, England; Grand Slam; Grass – $539,167 – S128/D64/48XD; Singles – Doubles – Mixed doubles	(Australia) Peter McNamara (Australia) Paul McNamee; 6–3, 6–2	(United States) Peter Fleming (United States) John McEnroe	(United States) Tim Mayotte (Australia) Mark Edmondson	(South Africa) Johan Kriek (United States) Brian Teacher (United States) Vitas Gerulaitis (United States) Gene Mayer
21 Jun; 28 Jun	Wimbledon; London, England; Grand Slam; Grass – $539,167 – S128/D64/48XD; Singles – Doubles – Mixed doubles	(United States) Anne Smith (South Africa) Kevin Curren; 2–6, 6–3, 7–5	(Australia) Wendy Turnbull (United Kingdom) John Lloyd	(United States) Tim Mayotte (Australia) Mark Edmondson	(South Africa) Johan Kriek (United States) Brian Teacher (United States) Vitas Gerulaitis (United States) Gene Mayer

=== July ===
Week	Tournament	Champions	Runners-up	Semifinalists	Quarterfinalists
5 Jul	Swiss Open; Gstaad, Switzerland; Clay – $100,000 – 32S/16D	(Argentina) José Luis Clerc; 6–1, 6–3, 6–2	(Argentina) Guillermo Vilas	(United States) Bill Scanlon (Brazil) Marcos Hocevar	(Switzerland) Heinz Günthardt (Paraguay) Víctor Pecci (United States) Sandy Mayer (West Germany) Peter Elter
5 Jul	Swiss Open; Gstaad, Switzerland; Clay – $100,000 – 32S/16D	(United States) Ferdi Taygan (United States) Sandy Mayer; 6–2, 6–3	(Switzerland) Heinz Günthardt (Switzerland) Markus Günthardt	(United States) Bill Scanlon (Brazil) Marcos Hocevar	(Switzerland) Heinz Günthardt (Paraguay) Víctor Pecci (United States) Sandy Mayer (West Germany) Peter Elter
5 Jul	Newport, Rhode Island, US; Grass – $118,000 – 32S/16D	(United States) Hank Pfister; 6–1, 7–5	(United States) Mike Estep	(Nigeria) Nduka Odizor (Australia) Brad Drewett	(United States) Jay Lapidus (South Africa) Danie Visser (United States) John Sadri (United States) Scott McCain
5 Jul	Newport, Rhode Island, US; Grass – $118,000 – 32S/16D	(United States) John Sadri (United States) Andy Andrews; 3–6, 7–6, 7–5	(Australia) Syd Ball (Australia) Rod Frawley	(Nigeria) Nduka Odizor (Australia) Brad Drewett	(United States) Jay Lapidus (South Africa) Danie Visser (United States) John Sadri (United States) Scott McCain
5 Jul	Davis Cup quarterfinals St. Louis, Missouri, US – carpet Brisbane, Australia – grass Cervia, Italy – clay Paris, France – clay	Quarterfinal Winners; United States 3–2; Australia 4–1; New Zealand 3–2; France 3–2	Quarterfinal Losers; Sweden; Chile; Italy; Czechoslovakia		
12 Jul	Swedish Open; Båstad, Sweden; Clay – $88,500 – 32S/16D; Singles – Doubles	(Sweden) Mats Wilander; 6–4, 6–4	(Sweden) Henrik Sundström	(Argentina) Gustavo Tiberti (Sweden) Thomas Högstedt	(Spain) José López-Maeso (Sweden) Carl-Axel Hageskog (Colombia) Alejandro Cortes (New Zealand) Bruce Derlin
12 Jul	Swedish Open; Båstad, Sweden; Clay – $88,500 – 32S/16D; Singles – Doubles	(Sweden) Hans Simonsson (Sweden) Anders Järryd; 0–6, 6–3, 7–6	(Sweden) Joakim Nyström (Sweden) Mats Wilander	(Argentina) Gustavo Tiberti (Sweden) Thomas Högstedt	(Spain) José López-Maeso (Sweden) Carl-Axel Hageskog (Colombia) Alejandro Cortes (New Zealand) Bruce Derlin
12 Jul	U.S. Pro Tennis Championships; Boston, Massachusetts, US; Super Series; Clay – $200,000 – 64S/32D; Singles – Doubles	(Argentina) Guillermo Vilas; 6–4, 6–0	(United States) Mel Purcell	(France) Yannick Noah (Spain) Fernando Luna	(United States) Eric Fromm (Australia) John Alexander (Argentina) Alejandro Ganzábal (Czechoslovakia) Ivan Lendl
12 Jul	U.S. Pro Tennis Championships; Boston, Massachusetts, US; Super Series; Clay – $200,000 – 64S/32D; Singles – Doubles	(United States) Craig Wittus (United States) Steve Meister; 6–2, 6–3	(South Africa) Freddie Sauer (South Africa) Schalk van der Merwe	(France) Yannick Noah (Spain) Fernando Luna	(United States) Eric Fromm (Australia) John Alexander (Argentina) Alejandro Ganzábal (Czechoslovakia) Ivan Lendl
12 Jul	Mercedes Cup; Stuttgart, West Germany; Clay – $75,000 – 32S/16D; Singles – Doubles	(India) Ramesh Krishnan; 5–7, 6–3, 6–3, 7–6	(United States) Sandy Mayer	(West Germany) Peter Elter (West Germany) Ulrich Pinner	(Socialist Federal Republic of Yugoslavia) Marko Ostoja (Brazil) Marcos Hocevar (New Zealand) Chris Lewis (Romania) Florin Segărceanu
12 Jul	Mercedes Cup; Stuttgart, West Germany; Clay – $75,000 – 32S/16D; Singles – Doubles	(United States) Brian Teacher (Australia) Mark Edmondson; 6–3, 6–1	(West Germany) Andreas Maurer (West Germany) Wolfgang Popp	(West Germany) Peter Elter (West Germany) Ulrich Pinner	(Socialist Federal Republic of Yugoslavia) Marko Ostoja (Brazil) Marcos Hocevar (New Zealand) Chris Lewis (Romania) Florin Segărceanu
19 Jul	Dutch Open; Hilversum, Netherlands; Clay – $88,500 – 32S/16D	(Hungary) Balázs Taróczy; 7–6, 6–7, 6–3, 7–6	(United Kingdom) Buster Mottram	(United States) Brian Teacher (Sweden) Henrik Sundström	(Spain) José López-Maeso (Romania) Ilie Năstase (Switzerland) Heinz Günthardt (Argentina) Carlos Castellan
19 Jul	Dutch Open; Hilversum, Netherlands; Clay – $88,500 – 32S/16D	(Czechoslovakia) Tomáš Šmíd (Czechoslovakia) Jan Kodeš; 7–6, 6–4	(Switzerland) Heinz Günthardt (Hungary) Balázs Taróczy	(United States) Brian Teacher (Sweden) Henrik Sundström	(Spain) José López-Maeso (Romania) Ilie Năstase (Switzerland) Heinz Günthardt (Argentina) Carlos Castellan
19 Jul	Kitzbühel, Austria; Clay – $118,000 – 64S/32D	(Argentina) Guillermo Vilas; 7–6, 6–1	(Brazil) Marcos Hocevar	(Spain) José Higueras (Czechoslovakia) Pavel Složil	(France) Christophe Roger-Vasselin (Italy) Corrado Barazzutti (Australia) David Carter (United States) Jeff Borowiak
19 Jul	Kitzbühel, Austria; Clay – $118,000 – 64S/32D	(Australia) Kim Warwick (Australia) Mark Edmondson; 4–6, 6–4, 6–3	(Australia) Rod Frawley (Czechoslovakia) Pavel Složil	(Spain) José Higueras (Czechoslovakia) Pavel Složil	(France) Christophe Roger-Vasselin (Italy) Corrado Barazzutti (Australia) David Carter (United States) Jeff Borowiak
19 Jul	Sovran Bank Classic; Washington, D.C., US; Super Series; Clay – $200,000 – 64S/32D	(Czechoslovakia) Ivan Lendl; 6–3, 6–3	(United States) Jimmy Arias	(France) Yannick Noah (Argentina) José Luis Clerc	(United States) Rodney Harmon (United States) Van Winitsky (United States) Eric Fromm (France) Bernard Fritz
19 Jul	Sovran Bank Classic; Washington, D.C., US; Super Series; Clay – $200,000 – 64S/32D	(United States) Van Winitsky (Mexico) Raúl Ramírez; 7–5, 7–6	(Chile) Hans Gildemeister (Ecuador) Andrés Gómez	(France) Yannick Noah (Argentina) José Luis Clerc	(United States) Rodney Harmon (United States) Van Winitsky (United States) Eric Fromm (France) Bernard Fritz
26 Jul	Volvo International; North Conway, New Hampshire, US; Super Series; Clay – $200,000 – 64S/32D; Singles – Doubles	(Czechoslovakia) Ivan Lendl; 6–3, 6–2	(Spain) José Higueras	(Australia) Peter McNamara (Argentina) José Luis Clerc	(Paraguay) Víctor Pecci (United States) Mel Purcell (Spain) Fernando Luna (Hungary) Balázs Taróczy
26 Jul	Volvo International; North Conway, New Hampshire, US; Super Series; Clay – $200,000 – 64S/32D; Singles – Doubles	(United States) Ferdi Taygan (United States) Sherwood Stewart; 6–2, 7–6^{(7–3)}	(Peru) Pablo Arraya (United States) Eric Fromm	(Australia) Peter McNamara (Argentina) José Luis Clerc	(Paraguay) Víctor Pecci (United States) Mel Purcell (Spain) Fernando Luna (Hungary) Balázs Taróczy
26 Jul	South Orange, New Jersey, US; Clay – $88,500 – 32S/16D	(France) Yannick Noah; 6–3, 7–6	(Mexico) Raúl Ramírez	(Israel) Shlomo Glickstein (United States) Mike Cahill	(United States) Jimmy Arias (Bolivia) Mario Martínez (United States) Dick Stockton (United States) Jay Lapidus
26 Jul	South Orange, New Jersey, US; Clay – $88,500 – 32S/16D	(United States) Van Winitsky (Mexico) Raúl Ramírez; 3–6, 6–4, 6–1	(United States) Jai DiLouie (United States) Blaine Willenborg	(Israel) Shlomo Glickstein (United States) Mike Cahill	(United States) Jimmy Arias (Bolivia) Mario Martínez (United States) Dick Stockton (United States) Jay Lapidus

=== August ===
Week	Tournament	Champions	Runners-up	Semifinalists	Quarterfinalists
2 Aug	National Revenue Tennis Classic; Columbus, Ohio, US; Hard – $100,000 – 32S/16D	(United States) Jimmy Connors; 7–5, 6–0	(United States) Brian Gottfried	(United States) Chip Hooper (United States) Bruce Manson	(United States) Hank Pfister (United States) Harold Solomon (United States) Nick Saviano (United States) Steve Denton
2 Aug	National Revenue Tennis Classic; Columbus, Ohio, US; Hard – $100,000 – 32S/16D	(South Africa) Bernard Mitton (United States) Tim Gullikson; 4–6, 6–1, 6–4	(United States) Victor Amaya (United States) Hank Pfister	(United States) Chip Hooper (United States) Bruce Manson	(United States) Hank Pfister (United States) Harold Solomon (United States) Nick Saviano (United States) Steve Denton
2 Aug	U.S. Men's Clay Court Championships; Indianapolis, Indiana, US; Super Series; Clay – $200,000 – 64S/32D; Singles – Doubles	(Spain) José Higueras; 7–5, 5–7, 6–3	(United States) Jimmy Arias	(Sweden) Hans Simonsson (Argentina) José Luis Clerc	(Ecuador) Andrés Gómez (Chile) Hans Gildemeister (Peru) Pablo Arraya (United States) Mel Purcell
2 Aug	U.S. Men's Clay Court Championships; Indianapolis, Indiana, US; Super Series; Clay – $200,000 – 64S/32D; Singles – Doubles	(United States) Ferdi Taygan (United States) Sherwood Stewart; 6–4, 7–5	(South Africa) Robbie Venter (United States) Blaine Willenborg	(Sweden) Hans Simonsson (Argentina) José Luis Clerc	(Ecuador) Andrés Gómez (Chile) Hans Gildemeister (Peru) Pablo Arraya (United States) Mel Purcell
9 Aug	Cleveland, Ohio, US; Hard – $88,500 – 32S/16D	(United States) Sandy Mayer; 7–5, 6–3	(United States) Robert Van't Hof	(United States) Tim Wilkison (United States) Scott Davis	(United States) Dave Siegler (United States) Andy Kohlberg (United States) Hank Pfister (United States) Victor Amaya
9 Aug	Cleveland, Ohio, US; Hard – $88,500 – 32S/16D	(United States) Hank Pfister (United States) Victor Amaya; 6–4, 7–6	(United States) Matt Mitchell (United States) Craig Wittus	(United States) Tim Wilkison (United States) Scott Davis	(United States) Dave Siegler (United States) Andy Kohlberg (United States) Hank Pfister (United States) Victor Amaya
9 Aug	Player's Canadian Open; Toronto, Ontario, Canada; Super Series; Hard – $300,000 – 64S/32D; Singles	(United States) Vitas Gerulaitis; 4–6, 6–1, 6–3	(Czechoslovakia) Ivan Lendl	(United States) John McEnroe (United States) Jimmy Connors	(France) Henri Leconte (Israel) Shlomo Glickstein (United States) Steve Denton (United States) Lloyd Bourne
9 Aug	Player's Canadian Open; Toronto, Ontario, Canada; Super Series; Hard – $300,000 – 64S/32D; Singles	(Australia) Mark Edmondson (United States) Steve Denton; 6–7, 7–5, 6–2	(United States) Peter Fleming (United States) John McEnroe	(United States) John McEnroe (United States) Jimmy Connors	(France) Henri Leconte (Israel) Shlomo Glickstein (United States) Steve Denton (United States) Lloyd Bourne
16 Aug	ATP Championship; Mason, Ohio, US; Super Series; Hard – $300,000 – 64S/32D	(Czechoslovakia) Ivan Lendl; 6–2, 7–6	(United States) Steve Denton	(United States) John McEnroe (United States) Jimmy Connors	(France) Guy Forget (United States) Vitas Gerulaitis (United States) Gene Mayer (United States) Brian Gottfried
16 Aug	ATP Championship; Mason, Ohio, US; Super Series; Hard – $300,000 – 64S/32D	(United States) John McEnroe (United States) Peter Fleming; 6–2, 6–3	(United States) Steve Denton (Australia) Mark Edmondson	(United States) John McEnroe (United States) Jimmy Connors	(France) Guy Forget (United States) Vitas Gerulaitis (United States) Gene Mayer (United States) Brian Gottfried
16 Aug	Stowe Grand Prix; Stowe, Vermont, US; Hard – $75,000 – 32S/16D	(United States) Jay Lapidus; 6–4, 6–2	(United States) Eric Fromm	(United States) Terry Moor (United States) Tom Gullikson	(South Africa) Freddie Sauer (United States) Rodney Harmon (United States) Robert Van't Hof (Australia) John Alexander
16 Aug	Stowe Grand Prix; Stowe, Vermont, US; Hard – $75,000 – 32S/16D	(United States) John Sadri (United States) Andy Andrews; 6–3, 6–4	(United States) Eric Fromm (United States) Mike Fishbach	(United States) Terry Moor (United States) Tom Gullikson	(South Africa) Freddie Sauer (United States) Rodney Harmon (United States) Robert Van't Hof (Australia) John Alexander
30 Aug; 6 Sep	US Open; Flushing Meadow, New York, US; Grand Slam; Hard – $600,000 – 128S/64D/32XD; Singles – Doubles – Mixed doubles	(United States) Jimmy Connors; 6–3, 6–2, 4–6, 6–4	(Czechoslovakia) Ivan Lendl	(United States) John McEnroe (Argentina) Guillermo Vilas	(United States) Gene Mayer (Australia) Kim Warwick (United States) Tom Gullikson (United States) Rodney Harmon
30 Aug; 6 Sep	US Open; Flushing Meadow, New York, US; Grand Slam; Hard – $600,000 – 128S/64D/32XD; Singles – Doubles – Mixed doubles	(South Africa) Kevin Curren (United States) Steve Denton; 6–2, 6–7^{(4–7)}, 5–7, 6–2, 6–4	(United States) Victor Amaya (United States) Hank Pfister	(United States) John McEnroe (Argentina) Guillermo Vilas	(United States) Gene Mayer (Australia) Kim Warwick (United States) Tom Gullikson (United States) Rodney Harmon
30 Aug; 6 Sep	US Open; Flushing Meadow, New York, US; Grand Slam; Hard – $600,000 – 128S/64D/32XD; Singles – Doubles – Mixed doubles	(United States) Anne Smith (South Africa) Kevin Curren; 6–7, 7–6, 7–6	(United States) Barbara Potter (United States) Ferdi Taygan	(United States) John McEnroe (Argentina) Guillermo Vilas	(United States) Gene Mayer (Australia) Kim Warwick (United States) Tom Gullikson (United States) Rodney Harmon

=== September ===
Week	Tournament	Champions	Runners-up	Semifinalists	Quarterfinalists
13 Sep	Campionati Internazionali di Sicilia; Palermo, Italy; Clay – $100,000 – 32S/16D; Singles – Doubles	(Bolivia) Mario Martínez; 6–4, 7–5	(Australia) John Alexander	(United States) Jimmy Brown (Hungary) Balázs Taróczy	(Spain) José García Requena (Uruguay) Diego Pérez (Spain) Fernando Luna (Peru) Pablo Arraya
13 Sep	Campionati Internazionali di Sicilia; Palermo, Italy; Clay – $100,000 – 32S/16D; Singles – Doubles	(Italy) Enzo Vattuone (Italy) Gianni Marchetti; 6–4, 6–7, 6–3	(Uruguay) José Luis Damiani (Uruguay) Diego Pérez	(United States) Jimmy Brown (Hungary) Balázs Taróczy	(Spain) José García Requena (Uruguay) Diego Pérez (Spain) Fernando Luna (Peru) Pablo Arraya
13 Sep	Sawgrass Doubles; Florida, US; Clay – $200,000 – D32	(Mexico) Raúl Ramírez (United States) Brian Gottfried; Walkover	(Australia) Mark Edmondson (Australia) Kim Warwick	(United States) Wittus / (United States) Meister (United States) Gullikson / (United States) Gullikson	(United States) Hooper / (United States) Willenborg (United States) Amaya / (United States) Pfister (Australia) Fitzgerald / (United States) Krulevitz (South Africa) Curren / (United States) Denton
20 Sep	Bordeaux Open; Bordeaux, France; Clay – $88,500 – 32S/16D; Singles – Doubles	(Chile) Hans Gildemeister; 7–5, 6–1	(Peru) Pablo Arraya	(Uruguay) Diego Pérez (New Zealand) Chris Lewis	(Ecuador) Andrés Gómez (Spain) Fernando Luna (France) Loïc Courteau (Sweden) Hans Simonsson
20 Sep	Bordeaux Open; Bordeaux, France; Clay – $88,500 – 32S/16D; Singles – Doubles	(Ecuador) Andrés Gómez (Chile) Hans Gildemeister; 6–4, 6–2	(Sweden) Hans Simonsson (Sweden) Anders Järryd	(Uruguay) Diego Pérez (New Zealand) Chris Lewis	(Ecuador) Andrés Gómez (Spain) Fernando Luna (France) Loïc Courteau (Sweden) Hans Simonsson
20 Sep	Geneva Open; Geneva, Switzerland; Clay – $88,500 – 32S/16D; Singles – Doubles	(Sweden) Mats Wilander; 7–5, 4–6, 6–4	(Czechoslovakia) Tomáš Šmíd	(United States) Vitas Gerulaitis (West Germany) Damir Keretić	(Colombia) Jairo Velasco, Sr. (Italy) Claudio Panatta (United States) Jim Gurfein (France) Thierry Tulasne
20 Sep	Geneva Open; Geneva, Switzerland; Clay – $88,500 – 32S/16D; Singles – Doubles	(Czechoslovakia) Pavel Složil (Czechoslovakia) Tomáš Šmíd; 6–4, 6–0	(Australia) Carl Limberger (South Africa) Mike Myburg	(United States) Vitas Gerulaitis (West Germany) Damir Keretić	(Colombia) Jairo Velasco, Sr. (Italy) Claudio Panatta (United States) Jim Gurfein (France) Thierry Tulasne
20 Sep	Transamerica Open; San Francisco, California, US; Super Series; Carpet (i) – $200,000 – 32S/16D; Singles – Doubles	(United States) John McEnroe; 6–1, 6–3	(United States) Jimmy Connors	(United States) Sandy Mayer (United States) Eliot Teltscher	(United States) Jimmy Arias (United States) Brian Teacher (United States) Tim Mayotte (United States) Johan Kriek
20 Sep	Transamerica Open; San Francisco, California, US; Super Series; Carpet (i) – $200,000 – 32S/16D; Singles – Doubles	(United States) Brian Teacher (United States) Fritz Buehning; 6–7^{(5–7)}, 6–2, 7–5	(United States) Marty Davis (United States) Chris Dunk	(United States) Sandy Mayer (United States) Eliot Teltscher	(United States) Jimmy Arias (United States) Brian Teacher (United States) Tim Mayotte (United States) Johan Kriek
27 Sep	Wailea Pro Tennis Classic; Maui, Hawaii, US; Hard – $100,000 – 32S/16D	(Australia) John Fitzgerald; 6–2, 6–3	(United States) Brian Teacher	(United States) Brad Gilbert (United States) Vince Van Patten	(Zimbabwe) Andrew Pattison (United States) Jeff Borowiak (United States) Mike Cahill (United States) Trey Waltke
27 Sep	Wailea Pro Tennis Classic; Maui, Hawaii, US; Hard – $100,000 – 32S/16D	(United States) Eliot Teltscher (United States) Mike Cahill; 6–4, 6–4	(Paraguay) Francisco González (South Africa) Bernard Mitton	(United States) Brad Gilbert (United States) Vince Van Patten	(Zimbabwe) Andrew Pattison (United States) Jeff Borowiak (United States) Mike Cahill (United States) Trey Waltke
27 Sep	Davis Cup Semifinals; Perth, Australia – carpet (i); Aix-en-Provence, France – clay	Semifinal Winners; United States 5–0; France 3–2	Semifinal Losers; Australia; New Zealand		

=== October ===
Week	Tournament	Champions	Runners-up	Semifinalists	Quarterfinalists
4 Oct	Torneo Godó; Barcelona, Spain; Super Series; Clay – $200,000 – 64S/32D; Singles – Doubles	(Sweden) Mats Wilander; 6–3, 6–4, 6–3	(Argentina) Guillermo Vilas	(Argentina) José Luis Clerc (Brazil) Marcos Hocevar	(Czechoslovakia) Ivan Lendl (France) Thierry Tulasne (Chile) Hans Gildemeister (Brazil) Carlos Kirmayr
4 Oct	Torneo Godó; Barcelona, Spain; Super Series; Clay – $200,000 – 64S/32D; Singles – Doubles	(Sweden) Hans Simonsson (Sweden) Anders Järryd; 6–3, 6–2	(Brazil) Carlos Kirmayr (Brazil) Cássio Motta	(Argentina) José Luis Clerc (Brazil) Marcos Hocevar	(Czechoslovakia) Ivan Lendl (France) Thierry Tulasne (Chile) Hans Gildemeister (Brazil) Carlos Kirmayr
4 Oct	Gloweave Indoor Championships; Melbourne, Australia; Carpet (i) – $100,000 – 32S/16D	(United States) Vitas Gerulaitis; 2–6, 6–2, 6–2	(United States) Eliot Teltscher	(United States) Steve Denton (Australia) Pat Cash	(Australia) Paul McNamee (Australia) John Alexander (Australia) David Carter (United States) Matt Mitchell
4 Oct	Gloweave Indoor Championships; Melbourne, Australia; Carpet (i) – $100,000 – 32S/16D	(United States) Matt Mitchell (Paraguay) Francisco González; 7–6, 7–6	(Australia) Syd Ball (Australia) Rod Frawley	(United States) Steve Denton (Australia) Pat Cash	(Australia) Paul McNamee (Australia) John Alexander (Australia) David Carter (United States) Matt Mitchell
11 Oct	Swiss Indoors; Basel, Switzerland; Hard (i) – $118,000 – 32S/16D	(France) Yannick Noah; 6–4, 6–2, 6–3	(Sweden) Mats Wilander	(United States) Jay Lapidus (Sweden) Thomas Högstedt	(Paraguay) Víctor Pecci (Republic of Ireland) Matt Doyle (India) Ramesh Krishnan (France) Henri Leconte
11 Oct	Swiss Indoors; Basel, Switzerland; Hard (i) – $118,000 – 32S/16D	(France) Henri Leconte (France) Yannick Noah; 6–2, 6–2	(United States) Fritz Buehning (Czechoslovakia) Pavel Složil	(United States) Jay Lapidus (Sweden) Thomas Högstedt	(Paraguay) Víctor Pecci (Republic of Ireland) Matt Doyle (India) Ramesh Krishnan (France) Henri Leconte
11 Oct	Australian Indoor; Sydney, Australia; Super Series; Hard (i) – $200,000 – 32S/16D; Singles – Doubles	(United States) John McEnroe; 6–4, 6–1, 6–4	(United States) Gene Mayer	(United States) Jimmy Connors (United States) Steve Denton	(United States) Eliot Teltscher (Australia) John Alexander (United States) Brad Gilbert (Australia) Peter McNamara
11 Oct	Australian Indoor; Sydney, Australia; Super Series; Hard (i) – $200,000 – 32S/16D; Singles – Doubles	(United States) John McEnroe (United States) Peter Rennert; 6–3, 7–6	(United States) Steve Denton (Australia) Mark Edmondson	(United States) Jimmy Connors (United States) Steve Denton	(United States) Eliot Teltscher (Australia) John Alexander (United States) Brad Gilbert (Australia) Peter McNamara
18 Oct	Tokyo Outdoor; Tokyo, Japan; Clay – $147,000 – 32S/16D; Singles – Doubles	(United States) Jimmy Arias; 6–2, 2–6, 6–4	(France) Dominique Bedel	(Paraguay) Francisco González (India) Sashi Menon	(Italy) Gianni Ocleppo (United States) Andy Andrews (United States) Charles Strode (Canada) Glenn Michibata
18 Oct	Tokyo Outdoor; Tokyo, Japan; Clay – $147,000 – 32S/16D; Singles – Doubles	(United States) Ferdi Taygan (United States) Sherwood Stewart; 6–1, 3–6, 7–6	(United States) Tim Gullikson (United States) Tom Gullikson	(Paraguay) Francisco González (India) Sashi Menon	(Italy) Gianni Ocleppo (United States) Andy Andrews (United States) Charles Strode (Canada) Glenn Michibata
18 Oct	Vienna Indoor; Vienna, Austria; Hard (i) – $118,000 – 32S/16D; Singles – Doubles	(United States) Brian Gottfried; 6–1, 6–4, 6–0	(United States) Bill Scanlon	(France) Henri Leconte (United States) Mike De Palmer	(Italy) Corrado Barazzutti (Brazil) Marcos Hocevar (United States) Stan Smith (Brazil) João Soares
18 Oct	Vienna Indoor; Vienna, Austria; Hard (i) – $118,000 – 32S/16D; Singles – Doubles	(France) Henri Leconte (Czechoslovakia) Pavel Složil; 6–1, 7–6	(United States) Mark Dickson (United States) Terry Moor	(France) Henri Leconte (United States) Mike De Palmer	(Italy) Corrado Barazzutti (Brazil) Marcos Hocevar (United States) Stan Smith (Brazil) João Soares
25 Oct	Cologne Cup; Cologne, West Germany; Hard (i) – $75,000 – 32S/16D	(South Africa) Kevin Curren; 2–6, 6–2, 6–3	(Israel) Shlomo Glickstein	(Sweden) Jan Gunnarsson (United States) Mark Dickson	(South Africa) Freddie Sauer (United States) Nick Saviano (New Zealand) Russell Simpson (Czechoslovakia) Tomáš Šmíd
25 Oct	Cologne Cup; Cologne, West Germany; Hard (i) – $75,000 – 32S/16D	(Brazil) Carlos Kirmayr (Uruguay) José Luis Damiani; 6–2, 3–6, 7–5	(West Germany) Hans-Dieter Beutel (West Germany) Christoph Zipf	(Sweden) Jan Gunnarsson (United States) Mark Dickson	(South Africa) Freddie Sauer (United States) Nick Saviano (New Zealand) Russell Simpson (Czechoslovakia) Tomáš Šmíd
25 Oct	Paris Open; Paris, France; Hard (i) – $75,000 – 32S/16D; Singles – Doubles	(Poland) Wojciech Fibak; 6–2, 6–2, 6–2	(United States) Bill Scanlon	(United States) Brian Gottfried (Brazil) Marcos Hocevar	(France) Guy Forget (United States) Stan Smith (United States) Jay Lapidus (Italy) Adriano Panatta
25 Oct	Paris Open; Paris, France; Hard (i) – $75,000 – 32S/16D; Singles – Doubles	(United States) Brian Gottfried (United States) Bruce Manson; 6–4, 6–2	(United States) Jay Lapidus (United States) Richard Meyer	(United States) Brian Gottfried (Brazil) Marcos Hocevar	(France) Guy Forget (United States) Stan Smith (United States) Jay Lapidus (Italy) Adriano Panatta
25 Oct	Seiko Super Tennis; Tokyo, Japan; Super Series; Carpet (i) – $300,000 – 32S/16D; Singles – Doubles	(United States) John McEnroe; 7–6^{(8–6)}, 7–5	(Australia) Peter McNamara	(Australia) Mark Edmondson (United States) Vitas Gerulaitis	(United States) Steve Denton (United States) Pat Dupré (United States) Brian Teacher (United States) Robert Van't Hof
25 Oct	Seiko Super Tennis; Tokyo, Japan; Super Series; Carpet (i) – $300,000 – 32S/16D; Singles – Doubles	(United States) Tim Gullikson (United States) Tom Gullikson; 6–4, 3–6, 7–6	(United States) John McEnroe (United States) Peter Rennert	(Australia) Mark Edmondson (United States) Vitas Gerulaitis	(United States) Steve Denton (United States) Pat Dupré (United States) Brian Teacher (United States) Robert Van't Hof

=== November ===
Week	Tournament	Champions	Runners-up	Semifinalists	Quarterfinalists
1 Nov	Seiko Hong Kong Classic; Hong Kong; Hard – $100,000 – 32S/16D	(United States) Pat Du Pré; 6–3, 6–3	(United States) Morris Strode	(United States) Tim Wilkison (United States) Brad Gilbert	(United States) Tom Cain (Switzerland) Roland Stadler (United States) Mike Bauer (United States) Marty Davis
1 Nov	Seiko Hong Kong Classic; Hong Kong; Hard – $100,000 – 32S/16D	(United States) Morris Strode (United States) Charles Strode; 6–4, 3–6, 6–2	(Australia) Kim Warwick (United States) Van Winitsky	(United States) Tim Wilkison (United States) Brad Gilbert	(United States) Tom Cain (Switzerland) Roland Stadler (United States) Mike Bauer (United States) Marty Davis
1 Nov	Quito, Ecuador; Clay – $88,500 – 32S/16D	(Ecuador) Andrés Gómez; 6–3, 6–4	(France) Loïc Courteau	(Spain) José Higueras (Chile) Hans Gildemeister	(Argentina) Alejandro Ganzábal (United States) Eddie Dibbs (Ecuador) Ricardo Ycaza (Brazil) Cássio Motta
1 Nov	Quito, Ecuador; Clay – $88,500 – 32S/16D	(Chile) Pedro Rebolledo (Chile) Jaime Fillol; 6–2, 6–3	(United States) Egan Adams (United States) Rocky Royer	(Spain) José Higueras (Chile) Hans Gildemeister	(Argentina) Alejandro Ganzábal (United States) Eddie Dibbs (Ecuador) Ricardo Ycaza (Brazil) Cássio Motta
1 Nov	Stockholm Open; Stockholm, Sweden; Super Series; Hard (i) – $250,000 – 64S/32D; Singles – Doubles	(France) Henri Leconte; 7–6, 6–3	(Sweden) Mats Wilander	(United States) Jay Lapidus (Poland) Wojciech Fibak	(United States) Harold Solomon (New Zealand) Russell Simpson (Israel) Shlomo Glickstein (United States) Erick Iskersky
1 Nov	Stockholm Open; Stockholm, Sweden; Super Series; Hard (i) – $250,000 – 64S/32D; Singles – Doubles	(Sweden) Jan Gunnarsson (United States) Mark Dickson; 7–6, 6–7, 6–4	(United States) Sherwood Stewart (United States) Ferdi Taygan	(United States) Jay Lapidus (Poland) Wojciech Fibak	(United States) Harold Solomon (New Zealand) Russell Simpson (Israel) Shlomo Glickstein (United States) Erick Iskersky
8 Nov	Taipei International Championships; Taipei, Taiwan; Carpet (i) – $75,000 – 32S/16D; Singles – Doubles	(United States) Brad Gilbert; 6–1, 6–4	(United States) Craig Wittus	(France) Guy Forget (United States) Tim Wilkison	(United States) Robert Van't Hof (Australia) Phil Dent (United States) Morris Strode (United States) Mike Leach
8 Nov	Taipei International Championships; Taipei, Taiwan; Carpet (i) – $75,000 – 32S/16D; Singles – Doubles	(United States) Robert Van't Hof (United States) Larry Stefanki; 6–3, 7–6	(United States) Fred McNair (United States) Tim Wilkison	(France) Guy Forget (United States) Tim Wilkison	(United States) Robert Van't Hof (Australia) Phil Dent (United States) Morris Strode (United States) Mike Leach
8 Nov	Benson & Hedges Championships; London, England; Super Series; Carpet (i) – $250,000 – 32S/16D; Singles – Doubles	(United States) John McEnroe; 6–3, 6–2, 6–4	(United States) Brian Gottfried	(United States) Steve Denton (United States) Vincent Van Patten	(France) Henri Leconte (Czechoslovakia) Tomáš Šmíd (Ecuador) Andrés Gómez (Poland) Wojciech Fibak
8 Nov	Benson & Hedges Championships; London, England; Super Series; Carpet (i) – $250,000 – 32S/16D; Singles – Doubles	(United States) John McEnroe (United States) Peter Fleming; 7–6, 6–4	(Switzerland) Heinz Günthardt (Czechoslovakia) Tomáš Šmíd	(United States) Steve Denton (United States) Vincent Van Patten	(France) Henri Leconte (Czechoslovakia) Tomáš Šmíd (Ecuador) Andrés Gómez (Poland) Wojciech Fibak
15 Nov	Ancona Open; Ancona, Italy; Carpet (i) – $88,500 – 32S/16D; Singles – Doubles	(Sweden) Anders Järryd; 6–3, 6–2	(United States) Mike De Palmer	(South Africa) Bernard Mitton (Sweden) Hans Simonsson	(United States) Vince Van Patten (Bolivia) Mario Martínez (United States) Tim Gullikson (West Germany) Christoph Zipf
15 Nov	Ancona Open; Ancona, Italy; Carpet (i) – $88,500 – 32S/16D; Singles – Doubles	(Sweden) Hans Simonsson (Sweden) Anders Järryd; 4–6, 6–3, 7–6	(United States) Tim Gullikson (South Africa) Bernard Mitton	(South Africa) Bernard Mitton (Sweden) Hans Simonsson	(United States) Vince Van Patten (Bolivia) Mario Martínez (United States) Tim Gullikson (West Germany) Christoph Zipf
15 Nov	Bangkok, Thailand; Carpet (i) – $88,500 – 32S/16D	(United States) Mike Bauer; 6–1, 6–2	(United States) Jim Gurfein	(Hungary) Zoltán Kuhárszky (Austria) Peter Feigl	(United States) Jonathan Canter (India) Ramesh Krishnan (Switzerland) Roland Stadler (United States) Marty Davis
15 Nov	Bangkok, Thailand; Carpet (i) – $88,500 – 32S/16D	(United States) John Benson (United States) Mike Bauer; 7–5, 3–6, 6–3	(United States) Charles Strode (United States) Morris Strode	(Hungary) Zoltán Kuhárszky (Austria) Peter Feigl	(United States) Jonathan Canter (India) Ramesh Krishnan (Switzerland) Roland Stadler (United States) Marty Davis
15 Nov	South American Championships; São Paulo, Brazil; Super Series; Clay (i) – $250,000 – 32S/16D	(Argentina) José Luis Clerc; 6–2, 6–7, 6–3	(Brazil) Marcos Hocevar	(Ecuador) Andrés Gómez (Brazil) Carlos Kirmayr	(Chile) Hans Gildemeister (Belgium) Bernard Boileau (Colombia) Jairo Velasco (Spain) José Higueras
15 Nov	South American Championships; São Paulo, Brazil; Super Series; Clay (i) – $250,000 – 32S/16D	(Brazil) Cássio Motta (Brazil) Carlos Kirmayr; 6–3, 6–1	(Australia) Peter McNamara (United States) Ferdi Taygan	(Ecuador) Andrés Gómez (Brazil) Carlos Kirmayr	(Chile) Hans Gildemeister (Belgium) Bernard Boileau (Colombia) Jairo Velasco (Spain) José Higueras
22 Nov	Bahia, Brazil; Carpet – $88,500 – 32S/16D	(Chile) Jaime Fillol; 7–6, 6–4	(Chile) Ricardo Acuña	(Brazil) Carlos Kirmayr (United States) Andy Andrews	(United States) Rocky Royer (Spain) José López-Maeso (United States) Andy Kohlberg (United States) Egan Adams
22 Nov	Bahia, Brazil; Carpet – $88,500 – 32S/16D	(Brazil) João Soares (Brazil) Givaldo Barbosa; 7–6, 2–1, ret.	(Brazil) Thomaz Koch (Brazil) José Schmidt	(Brazil) Carlos Kirmayr (United States) Andy Andrews	(United States) Rocky Royer (Spain) José López-Maeso (United States) Andy Kohlberg (United States) Egan Adams
22 Nov	South African Open; Johannesburg, South Africa; Super Series; Hard – $300,000 – 32S/16D	(United States) Vitas Gerulaitis; 7–6, 6–2, 4–6, 7–6	(Argentina) Guillermo Vilas	(South Africa) Kevin Curren (Ecuador) Andrés Gómez	(United States) Brian Gottfried (Argentina) José Luis Clerc (Spain) José Higueras (United States) Johan Kriek
22 Nov	South African Open; Johannesburg, South Africa; Super Series; Hard – $300,000 – 32S/16D	(South Africa) Frew McMillan (United States) Brian Gottfried; 6–2, 6–2	(Israel) Shlomo Glickstein (Zimbabwe) Andrew Pattison	(South Africa) Kevin Curren (Ecuador) Andrés Gómez	(United States) Brian Gottfried (Argentina) José Luis Clerc (Spain) José Higueras (United States) Johan Kriek
22 Nov	Davis Cup Final; Grenoble, France – clay (i)	United States; 4–1	France		
29 Nov; 6 Dec	Australian Open; Melbourne, Australia; Grand Slam; Grass – $450,000 – 96S/48D; Singles – Doubles	(United States) Johan Kriek; 6–3, 6–3, 6–2	(United States) Steve Denton	(Australia) Paul McNamee (United States) Hank Pfister	(United States) Drew Gitlin (Australia) Pat Cash (United States) Brian Teacher (United States) Sammy Giammalva
29 Nov; 6 Dec	Australian Open; Melbourne, Australia; Grand Slam; Grass – $450,000 – 96S/48D; Singles – Doubles	(Australia) John Alexander (Australia) John Fitzgerald; 6–4, 7–6	(United States) Andy Andrews (United States) John Sadri	(Australia) Paul McNamee (United States) Hank Pfister	(United States) Drew Gitlin (Australia) Pat Cash (United States) Brian Teacher (United States) Sammy Giammalva

=== December ===
Week	Tournament	Champions	Runners-up	Semifinalists	Quarterfinalists
6 Dec	Grand Prix de Tennis de Toulouse; Toulouse, France; Hard (i) – $88,500 – 32S/16D; Singles – Doubles	(France) Yannick Noah; 6–3, 6–2	(Czechoslovakia) Tomáš Šmíd	(Czechoslovakia) Stanislav Birner (West Germany) Michael Westphal	(Sweden) Anders Järryd (Sweden) Magnus Tideman (Israel) Shlomo Glickstein (Sweden) Stefan Simonsson
6 Dec	Grand Prix de Tennis de Toulouse; Toulouse, France; Hard (i) – $88,500 – 32S/16D; Singles – Doubles	(Czechoslovakia) Tomáš Šmíd (Czechoslovakia) Pavel Složil; 6–4, 6–4	(France) Jean-Louis Haillet (France) Yannick Noah	(Czechoslovakia) Stanislav Birner (West Germany) Michael Westphal	(Sweden) Anders Järryd (Sweden) Magnus Tideman (Israel) Shlomo Glickstein (Sweden) Stefan Simonsson
13 Dec	Sydney Outdoor; Sydney, Australia; Grass – $147,000 – 64S/32D	(Australia) John Alexander; 4–6, 7–6, 6–4	(Australia) John Fitzgerald	(United States) Sammy Giammalva (United States) Tim Wilkison	(Australia) Wally Masur (United States) Richard Meyer (Paraguay) Francisco González (Australia) Craig Miller
13 Dec	Sydney Outdoor; Sydney, Australia; Grass – $147,000 – 64S/32D	(Australia) John Fitzgerald (Australia) John Alexander; 6–4, 7–6	(Australia) Cliff Letcher (Australia) Craig Miller	(United States) Sammy Giammalva (United States) Tim Wilkison	(Australia) Wally Masur (United States) Richard Meyer (Paraguay) Francisco González (Australia) Craig Miller
20 Dec	South Australian Open; Adelaide, Australia; Grass – $75,000 – 32S/16D; Singles – Doubles	(United States) Mike Bauer; 4–6, 7–6, 6–2	(Australia) Chris Johnstone	(Australia) Pat Cash (Australia) Broderick Dyke	(South Africa) Bernard Mitton (Australia) Rod Frawley (Australia) Greg Whitecross (United States) Mike De Palmer
20 Dec	South Australian Open; Adelaide, Australia; Grass – $75,000 – 32S/16D; Singles – Doubles	(Australia) Pat Cash (Australia) Chris Johnstone; 6–3, 6–7, 7–6	(Australia) Broderick Dyke (Australia) Wayne Hampson	(Australia) Pat Cash (Australia) Broderick Dyke	(South Africa) Bernard Mitton (Australia) Rod Frawley (Australia) Greg Whitecross (United States) Mike De Palmer
27 Dec	Melbourne, Australia; Grass – $88,500 – 32S/16D	(Australia) Pat Cash; 6–4, 7–6	(Australia) Rod Frawley	(United States) Jeff Borowiak (Australia) Craig Miller	(United States) Hank Pfister (New Zealand) Chris Lewis (United States) Mike Gandolfo (Australia) Brad Drewett
27 Dec	Melbourne, Australia; Grass – $88,500 – 32S/16D	(United Kingdom) Jonathan Smith (South Africa) Eddie Edwards; 7–6, 6–3	(Australia) Broderick Dyke (Australia) Wayne Hampson	(United States) Jeff Borowiak (Australia) Craig Miller	(United States) Hank Pfister (New Zealand) Chris Lewis (United States) Mike Gandolfo (Australia) Brad Drewett

=== January 1983 ===
Week	Tournament	Champions	Runners-up	Semifinalists	Quarterfinalists
17 Jan	Volvo Masters; New York, US; Grand Prix Masters; Carpet (i) – $400,000 – 12S/6D; Singles – Doubles	(Czechoslovakia) Ivan Lendl; 6–4, 6–4, 6–2	(United States) John McEnroe	(United States) Jimmy Connors (Argentina) Guillermo Vilas	(United States) Johan Kriek (France) Yannick Noah (Argentina) José Luis Clerc (Ecuador) Andrés Gómez
17 Jan	Volvo Masters; New York, US; Grand Prix Masters; Carpet (i) – $400,000 – 12S/6D; Singles – Doubles	(United States) Peter Fleming (United States) John McEnroe; 7–5, 6–3	(United States) Ferdi Taygan (United States) Sherwood Stewart	(United States) Jimmy Connors (Argentina) Guillermo Vilas	(United States) Johan Kriek (France) Yannick Noah (Argentina) José Luis Clerc (Ecuador) Andrés Gómez

== Points system ==
The tournaments were divided into fifteen point categories. The highest points were allocated to the Grand Slam tournaments; French Open, the Wimbledon Championships, the US Open and the Australian Open. Points were allocated based on these categories and the finishing position of a player in a tournament. Except for the Grand Slam events, the points shown here are based on 32 draw tournaments. For Super Series tournaments, the Grand Prix points are increased by one category for each additional 16 places in the draw up to a maximum increase of two additional categories. The maximum increase for Regular Series tournaments shall be one category. The points allocation, with doubles points listed in brackets, is as follows:

	Grand Slam	$400,000+	$375,000+	$350,000+	$325,000+	$300,000+	$275,000+	$250,000+	$225,000+	$200,000+	$175,000+	$150,000+	$125,000+	$100,000+	$75,000+
Winner	450 (90)	400 (80)	375 (75)	350 (70)	325 (65)	300 (60)	275 (55)	250 (50)	225 (45)	200 (40)	175 (35)	150 (30)	125 (25)	120 (20)	75 (15)
Runner-up	298 (63)	280 (56)	263 (52)	245 (49)	227 (45)	210 (42)	192 (38)	175 (35)	157 (31)	140 (28)	122 (24)	104 (20)	87 (17)	70 (14)	
Semifinalist	180 (36)	160 (32)	150 (30)	140 (28)	130 (26)	120 (24)	110 (22)	100 (20)	90 (18)	80 (16)	70 (14)	60 (12)	50 (10)	40 (8)	30 (6)
Quarterfinalist	90 (18)	80 (16)	75 (15)	70 (14)	65 (13)	60 (12)	55 (11)	50 (10)	45 (9)	40 (8)	35 (7)	30 (6)	25 (5)	20 (4)	15 (3)
Last 16	45 (9)	40 (8)	37 (8)	35 (7)	32 (7)	30 (6)	27 (6)	25 (5)	22 (5)	20 (4)	17 (3)	14 (3)	12 (2)	10 (2)	7 (–)
Last 32	21 (4)	19 (–)	18 (–)	17 (–)	16 (–)	15 (–)	13 (–)	12 (–)	11 (–)	10 (–)	9 (–)	7 (–)	6 (–)	5 (–)	– (–)
Last 64	10 (–)	– (–)	– (–)	– (–)	– (–)	– (–)	– (–)	– (–)	– (–)	– (–)	– (–)	– (–)	– (–)	– (–)	– (–)

== Tournaments ranked by Grand Prix points & prize money ==
Tournament	Prize money	Category
Grand Slam tournaments (4)		GS
Volvo Masters	$500,000	
Milan	$350,000 (32 draw)	$350,000
Italian Open	$300,000 (64 draw)	$350,000
Canadian Open	$300,000 (64 draw)	$350,000
Cincinnati	$300,000 (64 draw)	$350,000
Monte Carlo Open	$300,000 (32 draw)	$300,000
Philadelphia	$300,000 (32 draw)	$300,000
Monterrey	$300,000 (32 draw)	$300,000
Las Vegas	$300,000 (32 draw)	$300,000
Tokyo	$300,000 (32 draw)	$300,000
South African Open	$300,000 (32 draw)	$300,000
German Open	$250,000 (64 draw)	$300,000
Stockholm Open	$250,000 (64 draw)	$300,000

== Grand Prix standings ==
Rk	Name	Points	Bonus prize money
1	Jimmy Connors (USA)	3,355	$600,000
2	Guillermo Vilas (ARG)	2,495	$400,000
3	Ivan Lendl (TCH)	2,313	$300,000
4	John McEnroe (USA)	2,305	$200,000
5	Mats Wilander (SWE)	1,730	$125,000
6	Vitas Gerulaitis (USA)	1,680	$100,000
7	José Higueras (ESP)	1,316	$80,000
8	Johan Kriek (RSA)	1,220	$70,000
9	Andrés Gomez (ECU)	1,196	$45,000
10	Steve Denton (USA)	1,175	$35,000

== ATP rankings ==
As of January 1982
Rk	Name	Nation
1	John McEnroe	USA
2	Ivan Lendl	TCH
3	Jimmy Connors	USA
4	Björn Borg	SWE
5	José Luis Clerc	ARG
6	Guillermo Vilas	ARG
7	Gene Mayer	USA
8	Eliot Teltscher	USA
9	Vitas Gerulaitis	USA
10	Peter McNamara	AUS
11	Roscoe Tanner	USA
12	Yannick Noah	FRA
13	Johan Kriek	RSA
14	Sandy Mayer	USA
15	Balázs Taróczy	HUN
16	Brian Teacher	USA
17	Víctor Pecci	PAR
18	Wojciech Fibak	POL
19	Brian Gottfried	USA
20	Mark Edmondson	AUS

Year-end rankings 1982 (3 January 1983)
Rk	Name	Nation	Avg Points	Points	Tourn	Change
1	John McEnroe	USA	122.58	1471	12	=
2	Jimmy Connors	USA	121.47	2065	17	▲ +1
3	Ivan Lendl	TCH	115.00	1380	12	▼ –1
4	Guillermo Vilas	ARG	104.64	1465	14	▲ +2
5	Vitas Gerulaitis	USA	62.00	992	16	▲ +4
6	José Luis Clerc	ARG	54.57	764	14	▼ –1
7	Mats Wilander	SWE	54.35	1087	20	▲ +62
8	Gene Mayer	USA	52.54	683	13	▼ –1
9	Yannick Noah	FRA	49.53	743	15	▲ +3
10	Peter McNamara	AUS	48.92	636	13	=
11	José Higueras	ESP				▲ +25
12	Johan Kriek	USA				▲ +1
13	Steve Denton	USA				▲ +11
14	Eliot Teltscher	USA				▼ -6
15	Andrés Gómez	ECU				▲ +22
16	Sandy Mayer	USA				▼ –2
17	Kevin Curren	RSA				▲ +40
18	Brian Teacher	USA				▼ -2
19	Buster Mottram	GBR				▲ +49
20	Jimmy Arias	USA				▲ +61

*The official ATP year-end rankings were listed from January 3rd, 1983.

== List of tournament winners ==
The list of winners and number of singles titles won, alphabetically by last name:

- (Australia) John Alexander (2) Bristol, Sydney Outdoor
- (United States) Jimmy Arias (1) Tokyo Outdoor
- (United States) Mike Bauer (2) Bangkok, Adelaide
- (Australia) Pat Cash (1) Melbourne (January 1983)
- (Argentina) José Luis Clerc (5) Richmond WCT, Venice, Gstaad, Zell am See, São Paulo
- (United States) Jimmy Connors (7) Monterrey, Los Angeles, Las Vegas, Queen's Club, Wimbledon, Columbus, US Open
- (South Africa) Kevin Curren (1) Cologne
- (Australia) Brad Drewett (1) Cairo
- (United States) Pat Du Pré (1) Hong Kong
- (Poland) Wojciech Fibak (3) Amsterdam WCT, Bercy, Chicago-2 WCT
- (Chile) Jaime Fillol (2) Bahia, Itaparica
- (Australia) John Fitzgerald (1) Maui
- (Australia) Rod Frawley (1) Adelaide-2
- (United States) Vitas Gerulaitis (5) Brussels, Florence, Toronto, Melbourne Indoor, Johannesburg
- (United States) Brad Gilbert (1) Taiwan
- (Chile) Hans Gildemeister (1) Bordeaux
- (Ecuador) Andrés Gómez (2) Rome, Quito
- (United States) Brian Gottfried (2) Tampa, Vienna
- (Spain) José Higueras (2) Hamburg, Indianapolis
- (United States) Erick Iskersky (1) Metz
- (Sweden) Anders Järryd (2) Linz, Ancona
- (South Africa) (United States) Johan Kriek (3) Memphis, La Costa WCT, Australian Open
- (India) Ramesh Krishnan (1) Stuttgart Outdoor
- (United States) Jay Lapidus (1) Stowe
- (France) Henri Leconte (1) Stockholm
- (Czechoslovakia) Ivan Lendl (15) Delray Beach WCT, Genova WCT, Munich-2 WCT, Strasbourg WCT, Frankfurt, Houston, Dallas WCT, Forest Hills WCT, Washington, D.C., North Conway, Cincinnati, Los Angeles-2 WCT, Naples Finals WCT, Hartford, Masters
- (Bolivia) Mario Martínez (1) Palermo
- (United States) Gene Mayer (1) Munich
- (United States) Sandy Mayer (1) Cleveland
- (United States) John McEnroe (5) Philadelphia, San Francisco, Sydney Indoor, Tokyo Indoor, Wembley
- (Australia) Paul McNamee (1) Baltimore WCT
- (France) Yannick Noah (3) La Quinta, South Orange, Toulouse
- (Spain) Manuel Orantes (2) Bournemouth, Basel
- (United States) Hank Pfister (1) Newport
- (Mexico) Raúl Ramírez (1) Caracas
- (Chile) Pedro Rebolledo (1) Viña del Mar
- (United States) John Sadri (1) Denver
- (United States) Bill Scanlon (1) Zurich WCT
- (Czechoslovakia) Tomáš Šmíd (2) Mexico City WCT, Cap d'Adge WCT
- (Hungary) Balázs Taróczy (2) Nice, Hilversum
- (United States) Brian Teacher (1) Dortmund
- (Argentina) Guillermo Vilas (7) Buenos Aires, Rotterdam, Milan, Monte Carlo, Madrid, Boston, Kitzbühel
- (Sweden) Mats Wilander (3) French Open, Geneva, Barcelona
- (United States) Tim Wilkison (1) Auckland
- (United States) Van Winitsky (2) Guarujá, Hilton Head WCT

The following players won their first title in 1982:

- (United States) Jimmy Arias Tokyo Outdoor
- (United States) Mike Bauer Bangkok
- (Australia) Pat Cash Melbourne (January 1983)
- (United States) Pat Du Pré Hong Kong
- (Australia) Rod Frawley Adelaide-2
- (United States) Brad Gilbert Taiwan
- (United States) Erick Iskersky Metz
- (Sweden) Anders Järryd Linz
- (United States) Jay Lapidus Stowe
- (France) Henri Leconte Stockholm
- (Sweden) Mats Wilander French Open

== See also ==
- 1982 World Championship Tennis
- 1982 WTA Tour
