= 1982 German Open Championships – Doubles =

Doubles
- 1982 German Open Championships

Final
- Champions: (Czechoslovakia) Tomáš Šmíd (Czechoslovakia) Pavel Složil
- Runners-up: (Sweden) Anders Järryd (Sweden) Hans Simonsson
- Score: 6–4, 6–3

Details
- Draw: 32
- Seeds: 8

Events
Singles	Doubles
← 1981 ·	Hamburg European Open	· 1983 →

Andrés Gómez and Hans Gildemeister were the defending champions, but Gildemeister did not compete this year. Gómez teamed up with Ricardo Ycaza and lost in the quarterfinals to Heinz Günthardt and Balázs Taróczy.

Tomáš Šmíd and Pavel Složil won the title by defeating Anders Järryd and Hans Simonsson 6–4, 6–3 in the final.

== Seeds ==
1. (Switzerland) Heinz Günthardt / (Hungary) Balázs Taróczy (semifinals)
2. (Czechoslovakia) Pavel Složil / (Czechoslovakia) Tomáš Šmíd (champions)
3. (United States) Ferdi Taygan / (United States) Eliot Teltscher (second round)
4. (Sweden) Anders Järryd / (Sweden) Hans Simonsson (final)
5. (Ecuador) Andrés Gómez / (Ecuador) Ricardo Ycaza (quarterfinals)
6. (Brazil) Carlos Kirmayr / (Brazil) Cássio Motta (first round)
7. (Australia) David Carter / (Australia) Phil Dent (second round)
8. (Australia) Rod Frawley / (New Zealand) Chris Lewis (first round)

== Draw ==
=== Key ===
- Q = Qualifier
- WC = Wild card
- LL = Lucky loser
- Alt = Alternate
- SE = Special exempt
- PR = Protected ranking
- ITF = ITF entry
- JE = Junior exempt
- w/o = Walkover
- r = Retired
- d = Defaulted
- SR = Special ranking

=== Finals ===
Semifinals
1	(Switzerland) Heinz Günthardt (Hungary) Balázs Taróczy	6	3
4	(Sweden) Anders Järryd (Sweden) Hans Simonsson	7	6
(Sweden) Jan Gunnarsson (Sweden) Henrik Sundström
2	(Czechoslovakia) Pavel Složil (Czechoslovakia) Tomáš Šmíd	w/o

Final
4	(Sweden) Anders Järryd (Sweden) Hans Simonsson	4	3
2	(Czechoslovakia) Pavel Složil (Czechoslovakia) Tomáš Šmíd	6	6

=== Top half ===
First round
1	(Switzerland) H Gunthardt (Hungary) B Taroczy	7	7
(Germany) H Beermann (Germany) H Theissen	6	6
(Poland) W Fibak (Australia) J Fitzgerald	6	6
(West Germany) A Maurer (Germany) W Popp	3	2
(France) H Leconte (France) C Roger-Vasselin	6	6
(Germany) R Osterthun (West Germany) H Schwaier	3	2
(Zimbabwe) H Ismail (Germany) P Spang	5	6	6
5	(Ecuador) A Gómez (Ecuador) R Ycaza	7	2	7
4	(Sweden) A Järryd (Sweden) H Simonsson	6	6
(Croatia) M Ostoja (Chile) P Rebolledo	4	2
(Peru) P Arraya (Paraguay) V Pecci	6	6
(Argentina) R Cano (Brazil) M Hocevar	3	4
(New Zealand) B Derlin (South Africa) F Sauer	6	6
(Republic of Ireland) M Doyle (Germany) H Kirchhubel	2	3
(Sweden) J Nyström (Sweden) M Wilander	7	2	6
8	(Australia) R Frawley (New Zealand) C Lewis	5	6	0

Second round
1	(Switzerland) H Gunthardt (Hungary) B Taroczy	6	6
(Poland) W Fibak (Australia) J Fitzgerald	3	3
(France) H Leconte (France) C Roger-Vasselin	6	6	2
5	(Ecuador) A Gómez (Ecuador) R Ycaza	2	7	6
4	(Sweden) A Järryd (Sweden) H Simonsson	7	6	6
(Peru) P Arraya (Paraguay) V Pecci	6	7	4
(New Zealand) B Derlin (South Africa) F Sauer	4	6	1
(Sweden) J Nyström (Sweden) M Wilander	6	4	6

Quarterfinals
1	(Switzerland) H Gunthardt (Hungary) B Taroczy	7	6
5	(Ecuador) A Gómez (Ecuador) R Ycaza	6	1
4	(Sweden) A Järryd (Sweden) H Simonsson	6	6	6
(Sweden) J Nyström (Sweden) M Wilander	7	1	3

Semifinals
1	(Switzerland) H Gunthardt (Hungary) B Taroczy	6	3
4	(Sweden) A Järryd (Sweden) H Simonsson	7	6

=== Bottom half ===
First round
7	(Australia) D Carter (Australia) P Dent	6	6
(West Germany) C Geyer (Germany) M Westphal	3	2
(Germany) H-D Beutel (Germany) C Zipf	5	6	7
(Uruguay) J-L Damiani (Uruguay) D Pérez	7	4	6
(Sweden) J Gunnarsson (Sweden) H Sundström	4	6	6
(Germany) K Eberhard (Germany) P Elter	6	2	1
(Spain) A Gimenez (Spain) J Higueras	4	2
3	(United States) F Taygan (United States) E Teltscher	6	6
6	(Brazil) C Kirmayr (Brazil) C Motta	1	4
(Colombia) A Cortés (Spain) J Lopez-Maeso	6	6
(Czechoslovakia) S Birner (Finland) L Palin	7	6
(Spain) J García Requena (Argentina) T Stålhandske	5	0
(Argentina) A Ganzábal (Argentina) G Guerrero	6	6
(Germany) R Probst (Germany) M Wunschig	4	0
(Germany) R Gehring (United Kingdom) C Mottram	1	0
2	(Czechoslovakia) P Slozil (Czechoslovakia) T Smid	6	6

Second round
7	(Australia) D Carter (Australia) P Dent	1	6	3
(Germany) H-D Beutel (Germany) C Zipf	6	4	6
(Sweden) J Gunnarsson (Sweden) H Sundström	2	7	6
3	(United States) F Taygan (United States) E Teltscher	6	6	4
(Colombia) A Cortés (Spain) J Lopez-Maeso	7	5	6
(Czechoslovakia) S Birner (Finland) L Palin	5	7	4
(Argentina) A Ganzábal (Argentina) G Guerrero	6	2	5
2	(Czechoslovakia) P Slozil (Czechoslovakia) T Smid	4	6	7

Quarterfinals
(Germany) H-D Beutel (Germany) C Zipf	4	6	6
(Sweden) J Gunnarsson (Sweden) H Sundström	6	0	7
(Colombia) A Cortés (Spain) J Lopez-Maeso	0	2
2	(Czechoslovakia) P Slozil (Czechoslovakia) T Smid	6	6

Semifinals
(Sweden) J Gunnarsson (Sweden) H Sundström
2	(Czechoslovakia) P Slozil (Czechoslovakia) T Smid	w/o
