= 1982 German Open Championships – Singles =

Singles
- 1982 German Open Championships

Final
- Champion: (Spain) José Higueras
- Runner-up: (Australia) Peter McNamara
- Score: 4–6, 6–7, 7–6, 6–3, 7–6

Details
- Draw: 64
- Seeds: 16

Events
Singles	Doubles
← 1981 ·	Hamburg European Open	· 1983 →

Peter McNamara was the defending champion, but lost in the final to José Higueras. The score was 4–6, 6–7, 7–6, 6–3, 7–6.

== Seeds ==
1. (United States) Jimmy Connors (quarterfinals, retired)
2. (United States) Eliot Teltscher (third round)
3. (Australia) Peter McNamara (final)
4. (United States) Gene Mayer (semifinals)
5. (Hungary) Balázs Taróczy (third round)
6. (Ecuador) Andrés Gómez (semifinals)
7. (United States) Eddie Dibbs (third round)
8. (Paraguay) Víctor Pecci (second round)
9. (United Kingdom) Buster Mottram (quarterfinals)
10. (Czechoslovakia) Tomáš Šmíd (quarterfinals)
11. (Poland) Wojciech Fibak (third round)
12. (Sweden) Mats Wilander (quarterfinals)
13. (withdrew)
14. (New Zealand) Chris Lewis (third round)
15. (Switzerland) Heinz Günthardt (third round)
16. (Spain) José Higueras (champion)

Click on the seed number of a player to go to their draw section.

== Draw ==
=== Key ===
- Q = Qualifier
- WC = Wild card
- LL = Lucky loser
- Alt = Alternate
- SE = Special exempt
- PR = Protected ranking
- ITF = ITF entry
- JE = Junior exempt
- w/o = Walkover
- r = Retired
- d = Defaulted
- SR = Special ranking

=== Finals ===
Quarterfinals
1	(United States) Jimmy Connors	0^{r}
6	(Ecuador) Andrés Gómez	5
3	(Australia) Peter McNamara	4	6	7
9	(United Kingdom) Buster Mottram	6	4	5
10	(Czechoslovakia) Tomáš Šmíd	6	3	3
4	(United States) Gene Mayer	4	6	6
12	(Sweden) Mats Wilander	2	2
16	(Spain) José Higueras	6	6

Semifinals
6	(Ecuador) Andrés Gómez	5	1	2
3	(Australia) Peter McNamara	7	6	6
4	(United States) Gene Mayer	2	2	2
16	(Spain) José Higueras	6	6	6

Final
3	(Australia) Peter McNamara	6	7	6	3	6
16	(Spain) José Higueras	4	6	7	6	7

=== Top half ===
==== Section 1 ====
First round
1	(United States) J Connors	7	6
(Argentina) R Cano	5	0
(France) H Leconte	6	6
(Finland) L Palin	0	0
(Spain) J Lopez-Maeso	6	3	6
(Brazil) J Soares	3	6	7
(Germany) M Westphal	4	1
15	(Switzerland) H Günthardt	6	6
14	(New Zealand) C Lewis	6	6
(Spain) J García Requena	2	3
Q	(Sweden) T Högstedt	6	6	4
(Sweden) A Järryd	7	3	6
(Australia) P Dent	6	6
Q	(Germany) H Theissen	4	2
(France) T Tulasne	4	5
6	(Ecuador) A Gómez	6	7

Second round
1	(United States) J Connors	6	7
(France) H Leconte	1	6
(Brazil) J Soares	5	6
15	(Switzerland) H Günthardt	7	7
14	(New Zealand) C Lewis	6	6
(Sweden) A Järryd	3	1
(Australia) P Dent	4	6	4
6	(Ecuador) A Gómez	6	3	6

Third round
1	(United States) J Connors	6	6
15	(Switzerland) H Günthardt	4	2
14	(New Zealand) C Lewis	2	4
6	(Ecuador) A Gómez	6	6

Quarterfinals
1	(United States) J Connors	0^{r}
6	(Ecuador) A Gómez	5

==== Section 2 ====
First round
3	(Australia) P McNamara	5	6	6
(Germany) P Elter	7	3	4
(Zimbabwe) H Ismail	5	6
(Brazil) C Kirmayr	7	7
(Sweden) J Nyström	7	4	6
(United States) J Arias	6	6	1
(Sweden) J Gunnarsson	6	5
11	(Poland) W Fibak	7	7
9	(United Kingdom) C Mottram	6	6
Q	(Germany) H Beermann	3	3
(West Germany) H Schwaier	4	4
Q	(Colombia) A Cortés	6	6
Q	(Sweden) H Sundström	4	4
(Argentina) A Ganzábal	6	6
(India) R Krishnan	5	3
7	(United States) E Dibbs	7	6

Second round
3	(Australia) P McNamara	6	5	6
(Brazil) C Kirmayr	3	7	3
(Sweden) J Nyström	6	6	4
11	(Poland) W Fibak	7	4	6
9	(United Kingdom) C Mottram	6	6
Q	(Colombia) A Cortés	1	0
(Argentina) A Ganzábal	5	6
7	(United States) E Dibbs	7	7

Third round
3	(Australia) P McNamara	6	7
11	(Poland) W Fibak	3	5
9	(United Kingdom) C Mottram	6	6
7	(United States) E Dibbs	4	3

Quarterfinals
3	(Australia) P McNamara	4	6	7
9	(United Kingdom) C Mottram	6	4	5

=== Bottom half ===
==== Section 3 ====
First round
5	(Hungary) B Taróczy	7	6
(Germany) C Zipf	6	2
(Germany) U Pinner	4	7	6
(West Germany) A Maurer	6	6	4
(Uruguay) D Pérez	7	6	0
(Peru) P Arraya	6	7	6
Q	(United Kingdom) J Lloyd	3	1
10	(Czechoslovakia) T Šmid	6	6
LL	(Australia) D Carter	1	3
(Spain) F Luna	6	6
(Germany) H-D Beutel	5	2
(Republic of Ireland) M Doyle	7	6
(Czechoslovakia) P Složil	6	6
(Spain) A Gimenez	1	1
(Hungary) Z Kuhárszky	3	6
4	(United States) G Mayer	6	7

Second round
5	(Hungary) B Taróczy	6	6	6
(Germany) U Pinner	1	7	1
(Peru) P Arraya	3	1
10	(Czechoslovakia) T Šmid	6	6
(Spain) F Luna	6	7
(Republic of Ireland) M Doyle	1	6
(Czechoslovakia) P Složil	5	6	4
4	(United States) G Mayer	7	2	6

Third round
5	(Hungary) B Taróczy	2	6	4
10	(Czechoslovakia) T Šmid	6	4	6
(Spain) F Luna	1	0
4	(United States) G Mayer	6	6

Quarterfinals
10	(Czechoslovakia) T Šmid	6	3	3
4	(United States) G Mayer	4	6	6

==== Section 4 ====
First round
8	(Paraguay) V Pecci	6	6
Q	(Brazil) M Hocevar	4	2
(South Africa) F Sauer	6	2	6
(Germany) K Eberhard	4	6	3
(Uruguay) J-L Damiani	7	6
(Ecuador) R Ycaza	6	4
(Italy) C Barazzutti	2	3
12	(Sweden) M Wilander	6	6
16	(Spain) J Higueras	5	6	6
(Chile) P Rebolledo	7	4	2
(France) C Roger-Vasselin	6	6
(Germany) R Gehring	3	1
(Czechoslovakia) S Birner	1	1
(United States) H Solomon	6	6
Q	(Spain) J Aguilera	3	1
2	(United States) E Teltscher	6	6

Second round
8	(Paraguay) V Pecci	7	4	6
(South Africa) F Sauer	5	6	7
(Uruguay) J-L Damiani	4	6
12	(Sweden) M Wilander	6	7
16	(Spain) J Higueras	6	6
(France) C Roger-Vasselin	2	2
(United States) H Solomon	0	2
2	(United States) E Teltscher	6	6

Third round
(South Africa) F Sauer	4	5
12	(Sweden) M Wilander	6	7
16	(Spain) J Higueras	6	6	6
2	(United States) E Teltscher	7	2	3

Quarterfinals
12	(Sweden) M Wilander	2	2
16	(Spain) J Higueras	6	6
