= 1982 Stockholm Open – Singles =

Singles
- 1982 Stockholm Open

Final
- Champion: (France) Henri Leconte
- Runner-up: (Sweden) Mats Wilander
- Score: 7–6, 6–3

Details
- Draw: 64
- Seeds: 16

Events
Singles	Doubles
- Stockholm Open

Gene Mayer was the defending champion, but did not participate this year.

Henri Leconte won the title, defeating Mats Wilander 7–6, 6–3 in the final.

== Seeds ==
1. (Sweden) Mats Wilander (final)
2. (United States) Steve Denton (first round)
3. (United States) Brian Teacher (first round)
4. (United Kingdom) Buster Mottram (third round, defaulted)
5. (United States) Brian Gottfried (second round)
6. (United States) Chip Hooper (first round)
7. (Czechoslovakia) Tomáš Šmíd (third round)
8. (United States) Mel Purcell (third round)
9. (Israel) Shlomo Glickstein (quarterfinals)
10. (United States) Vincent Van Patten (first round)
11. (United States) Mark Dickson (first round)
12. N/A
13. (Switzerland) Heinz Günthardt (first round)
14. (Poland) Wojtek Fibak (semifinals)
15. (France) Henri Leconte (champion)
16. (United States) Jay Lapidus (semifinals)

== Draw ==
Key

- Q = Qualifier
- WC = Wild card
- LL = Lucky loser
- Alt = Alternate
- ITF = ITF entry
- PR = Protected ranking
- SR = Special ranking
- SE = Special exempt
- JE = Junior exempt
- JR = Junior Accelerator Programme entrant
- CO = College Accelerator Programme entrant
- NG = Next Gen Accelerator Program entrant
- w/o = Walkover
- r = Retired
- d = Defaulted

=== Finals ===
Semifinals
1	(Sweden) Mats Wilander	6	6
16	(United States) Jay Lapidus	4	4
15	(France) Henri Leconte	3	6	6
14	(Poland) Wojtek Fibak	6	3	3

Final
1	(Sweden) Mats Wilander	6	3
15	(France) Henri Leconte	7	6

=== Top half ===
==== Section 1 ====
First round
1	(Sweden) M Wilander	6	6
Q	(Sweden) P Carlsson	0	3
(Sweden) S Edberg	3	7	1
(Sweden) T Högstedt	6	6	6
(Italy) C Panatta	6	6
(Austria) R Reininger	4	3
(United States) L Bourne	6	7
11	(United States) M Dickson	3	6
10	(United States) V Van Patten	2	6	1
(Sweden) H Sundström	6	4	6
(Sweden) M Tideman	2	6	6
(United States) P Rennert	6	3	1
(West Germany) K Meiler	3	6	2
(United States) H Solomon	6	3	6
(Socialist Federal Republic of Yugoslavia) M Ostoja	3	4
5	(United States) B Gottfried	6	6

Second round
1	(Sweden) M Wilander	6	3	6
(Sweden) T Högstedt	4	6	3
(Italy) C Panatta	5	4
(United States) L Bourne	7	6
(Sweden) H Sundström	6	1	6
(Sweden) M Tideman	3	6	1
(United States) H Solomon	4	6	7
5	(United States) B Gottfried	6	1	6

Third round
1	(Sweden) M Wilander	6	7
(United States) L Bourne	2	5
(Sweden) H Sundström	2	7	4
(United States) H Solomon	6	5	6

Quarterfinals
1	(Sweden) M Wilander	6	6
(United States) H Solomon	2	2

==== Section 2 ====
First round
4	(United Kingdom) B Mottram	6	6
(United States) E Fromm	4	3
Q	(United States) T Delatte	1	2
(India) R Krishnan	6	6
(Sweden) S Simonsson	6	6
(France) C Roger-Vasselin	4	0
(Sweden) J Windahl	4	4
16	(United States) J Lapidus	6	6
13	(Switzerland) H Günthardt	3	4
(Sweden) A Järryd	6	6
(Romania) F Segărceanu	2	6	3
(New Zealand) R Simpson	6	3	6
(United Kingdom) J Smith	6	7
(United States) A Kohlberg	2	6
(United States) F Buehning	1	3
8	(United States) M Purcell	6	6

Second round
4	(United Kingdom) B Mottram	7	6
(India) R Krishnan	5	2
(Sweden) S Simonsson	7	3	6
16	(United States) J Lapidus	6	6	7
(Sweden) A Järryd	3	1
(New Zealand) R Simpson	6	6
(United Kingdom) J Smith	3	3
8	(United States) M Purcell	6	6

Third round
4	(United Kingdom) B Mottram
16	(United States) J Lapidus	DEF
(New Zealand) R Simpson	6	6
8	(United States) M Purcell	1	1

Quarterfinals
16	(United States) J Lapidus	6	6
(New Zealand) R Simpson	4	2

=== Bottom half ===
==== Section 3 ====
First round
7	(Czechoslovakia) T Šmíd	4	7	7
(West Germany) P Elter	6	6	5
(Czechoslovakia) S Birner	6	1
(United States) N Saviano	7	6
(Sweden) R Båthman	6	6
(United States) V Amaya	3	4
Q	(Sweden) J Källqvist	2	2
15	(France) H Leconte	6	6
9	(Israel) S Glickstein	6	6	7
(United Kingdom) J Lloyd	7	4	6
(Finland) L Palin	7	6
Q	(United States) M Vines	5	4
(Romania) I Năstase	6	6
(United States) F Taygan	4	4
(Sweden) P Hjertquist	6	6
3	(United States) B Teacher	4	4

Second round
7	(Czechoslovakia) T Šmíd	6	1	6
(United States) N Saviano	3	6	3
(Sweden) R Båthman	2	2
15	(France) H Leconte	6	6
9	(Israel) S Glickstein	6	6
(Finland) L Palin	2	3
(Romania) I Năstase	7	6	0
(Sweden) P Hjertquist	6	7	6

Third round
7	(Czechoslovakia) T Šmíd	5	7	6
15	(France) H Leconte	7	6	7
9	(Israel) S Glickstein	6	6
(Sweden) P Hjertquist	4	0

Quarterfinals
15	(France) H Leconte	6	6
9	(Israel) S Glickstein	1	2

==== Section 4 ====
First round
6	(United States) C Hooper	1	6	3
(Sweden) H Simonsson	6	1	6
(Italy) A Panatta	7	6
Q	(Sweden) Ulf Pettersson	6	1
(Zimbabwe) H Ismail	2	1
(United States) B Manson	6	6
(United States) E Iskersky	6	6
LL	(France) C Bernelle	1	4
14	(Poland) W Fibak	7	7
(Nigeria) N Odizor	5	5
(Sweden) J Nyström	5	3
(Sweden) J Gunnarsson	7	6
(United States) S Smith	6	7
Q	(Sweden) Jan Sandberg	3	5
Q	(Finland) O Rahnasto	1	6	6
2	(United States) S Denton	6	3	4

Second round
(Sweden) H Simonsson	5	3
(Italy) A Panatta	7	6
(United States) B Manson	6	2
(United States) E Iskersky	7	6
14	(Poland) W Fibak	6	7
(Sweden) J Gunnarsson	2	6
(United States) S Smith	4	6	3
Q	(Finland) O Rahnasto	6	3	6

Third round
(Italy) A Panatta	4	1
(United States) E Iskersky	6	6
14	(Poland) W Fibak	6	6
Q	(Finland) O Rahnasto	1	3

Quarterfinals
(United States) E Iskersky	2	3
14	(Poland) W Fibak	6	6
