= 1982 South African Open (tennis) =

- Date: 23–28 November
- Edition: 79th
- Category: Grand Prix
- Draw: 32S / 16D
- Prize money: $300,000
- Surface: Hard / outdoor
- Location: Johannesburg, South Africa
- Venue: Ellis Park Tennis Stadium

Champions

Singles
- (United States) Vitas Gerulaitis

Doubles
- (United States) Brian Gottfried / (South Africa) Frew McMillan
- South African Open

The 1982 South African Open was a men's tennis tournament played on outdoor hard courts in Johannesburg, South Africa that was part of the 1982 Volvo Grand Prix. It was the 79th edition of the tournament and was held from 23 November through 28 November 1982. Vitas Gerulaitis won his second consecutive singles title at the event.

== Finals ==
=== Singles ===
(United States) Vitas Gerulaitis defeated (Argentina) Guillermo Vilas 7–6, 6–2, 4–6, 7–6

- It was Gerulaitis' 5th singles title of the year and the 24th of his career.

=== Doubles ===
(United States) Brian Gottfried / (South Africa) Frew McMillan defeated (Israel) Schlomo Glickstein / (United States) Andrew Pattison 6–2, 6–2
