= 1982 ATP Championship =

- Date: August 16–22
- Edition: 81st
- Category: Grand Prix circuit
- Draw: 64S / 32D
- Prize money: $300,000
- Surface: Hard / outdoor
- Location: Mason, Ohio, U.S.
- Venue: Lindner Family Tennis Center

Champions

Singles
- (Czechoslovakia) Ivan Lendl

Doubles
- (United States) Peter Fleming / (United States) John McEnroe
- Cincinnati Masters

The 1982 ATP Championship, also known as the Cincinnati Open, was a men's tennis tournament played on outdoor hard courts at the Lindner Family Tennis Center in Mason, Ohio in the United States that was part of the 1982 Volvo Grand Prix. The tournament was held from August 16 through August 22, 1982. Third-seeded Ivan Lendl won the singles title.

== Finals ==
=== Singles ===
(Czechoslovakia) Ivan Lendl defeated (United States) Steve Denton 6–2, 7–6

- It was Lendl's 11th singles title of the year and the 28th of his career.

=== Doubles ===
(United States) Peter Fleming / (United States) John McEnroe defeated (United States) Steve Denton / (Australia) Mark Edmondson 6–2, 6–3
