= 1982 U.S. National Indoor Championships =

- Date: February 8–14
- Edition: 12th
- Category: Grand Prix
- Draw: 48S / 24D
- Prize money: $250,000
- Surface: Carpet / indoor
- Location: Memphis, Tennessee, U.S.
- Venue: Racquet Club of Memphis

Champions

Singles
- (South Africa) Johan Kriek

Doubles
- (South Africa) Kevin Curren / (United States) Steve Denton
- U.S. National Indoor Championships

The 1982 U.S. National Indoor Championships was a men's tennis tournament played on indoor carpet courts that was part of the 1982 Volvo Grand Prix. It was the 12th edition of the tournament and was played at the Racquet Club of Memphis in Memphis, Tennessee in the United States from February 8 through February 14, 1982. Eighth-seeded Johan Kriek won the singles title and earned $40,000 first-prize money.

== Finals ==
=== Singles ===
(South Africa) Johan Kriek defeated (United States) John McEnroe 6–3, 3–6, 6–4

- It was Kriek's 1st singles title of the year and the 5th of his career.

=== Doubles ===
(South Africa) Kevin Curren / (United States) Steve Denton defeated (United States) Peter Fleming / (United States) John McEnroe 7–6, 4–6, 6–2
