= 1982 Sovran Bank Classic =

- Date: July 19–25
- Edition: 14th
- Category: Grand Prix
- Draw: 64S / 32D
- Prize money: $200,000
- Surface: Clay / outdoor
- Location: Washington, D.C., United States
- Venue: Rock Creek Park

Champions

Singles
- (Czechoslovakia) Ivan Lendl

Doubles
- (Mexico) Raúl Ramírez / (United States) Van Winitsky
- Washington Open

The 1982 Sovran Bank Classic was a men's tennis tournament and was played on outdoor clay courts. The event was part of the 1982 Grand Prix circuit. It was the 14th edition of the tournament and was held at Rock Creek Park in Washington, D.C. from July 19 through July 25, 1982. First-seeded Ivan Lendl won the singles title.

== Finals ==
=== Singles ===
(Czechoslovakia) Ivan Lendl defeated (United States) Jimmy Arias 6–3, 6–3

- It was Lendl's 9th singles title of the year and the 26th of his career.

=== Doubles ===
(Mexico) Raúl Ramírez / (United States) Van Winitsky defeated (Chile) Hans Gildemeister / (Ecuador) Andrés Gómez 7–5, 7–6
