= 1981 Swiss Indoors =

- Date: 12–18 October
- Edition: 13th
- Category: Grand Prix
- Draw: 32S / 16D
- Prize money: $75,000
- Surface: Hard / indoor
- Location: Basel, Switzerland
- Venue: St. Jakobshalle

Champions

Singles
- (Czechoslovakia) Ivan Lendl

Doubles
- (Romania) Ilie Năstase / (Argentina) José Luis Clerc
← 1980 ·	Swiss Indoors	· 1982 →

The 1981 Swiss Indoors was a men's tennis tournament played on indoor hard courts at the St. Jakobshalle in Basel, Switzerland that was part of the 1981 Volvo Grand Prix. It was the 13th edition of the tournament and was held from 12 October through 18 October 1981. First-seeded Ivan Lendl won the singles title.

== Finals ==
=== Singles ===
(Czechoslovakia) Ivan Lendl defeated (Argentina) José Luis Clerc 6–2, 6–3, 6–0

- It was Lendl's 6th singles title of the year and the 13th of his career.

=== Doubles ===
(Romania) Ilie Năstase / (Argentina) José Luis Clerc defeated (Switzerland) Markus Günthardt / (Czechoslovakia) Pavel Složil 7–6, 6–7, 7–6
