= 1982 Swiss Open =

- Date: 5–11 July
- Edition: 36th
- Category: Grand Prix
- Draw: 32S / 16D
- Prize money: $100,000
- Surface: Clay / outdoor
- Location: Gstaad, Switzerland

Champions

Singles
- (Argentina) José Luis Clerc

Doubles
- (United States) Ferdi Taygan / (United States) Sandy Mayer
- Suisse Open Gstaad

The 1982 Swiss Open was a men's tennis tournament played on outdoor clay courts in Gstaad, Switzerland that was part of the 1982 Volvo Grand Prix tennis circuit. It was the 36th edition of the tournament and was held from 5 July through 11 July 1982. Second-seeded José Luis Clerc won the singles title.

== Finals ==
=== Singles ===
(Argentina) José Luis Clerc defeated (Argentina) Guillermo Vilas 6–1, 6–3, 6–2

- It was Clerc's 3rd singles title of the year and the 19th of his career.

=== Doubles ===
(United States) Ferdi Taygan/ (United States) Sandy Mayer defeated (Switzerland) Heinz Günthardt / (Switzerland) Markus Günthardt 6–2, 6–3
