= 1982 Stockholm Open – Doubles =

Doubles
- 1982 Stockholm Open

Final
- Champions: (United States) Mark Dickson (Sweden) Jan Gunnarsson
- Runners-up: (United States) Sherwood Stewart (United States) Ferdi Taygan
- Score: 7–6, 6–7, 6–4

Details
- Draw: 32
- Seeds: 8

Events
Singles	Doubles
- Stockholm Open

Kevin Curren and Steve Denton were the defending champions, but Curren did not participate this year. Denton partnered Victor Amaya, losing in the second round.

Mark Dickson and Jan Gunnarsson won the title, defeating Sherwood Stewart and Ferdi Taygan 7–6, 6–7, 6–4 in the final.

== Seeds ==
1. (United States) Sherwood Stewart / (United States) Ferdi Taygan (final)
2. (United States) Victor Amaya / (United States) Steve Denton (second round)
3. (Switzerland) Heinz Günthardt / (Czechoslovakia) Tomáš Šmíd (second round)
4. (Sweden) Anders Järryd / (Sweden) Hans Simonsson (quarterfinals)
5. (United States) Fritz Buehning / (United States) Brian Teacher (semifinals)
6. (United States) Brian Gottfried / (United States) Bruce Manson (quarterfinals)
7. (United States) Chip Hooper / (United States) Peter Rennert (second round)
8. (France) Henri Leconte / (Romania) Ilie Năstase (first round)

== Draw ==
Key

- Q = Qualifier
- WC = Wild card
- LL = Lucky loser
- Alt = Alternate
- ITF = ITF entry
- PR = Protected ranking
- SR = Special ranking
- SE = Special exempt
- JE = Junior exempt
- JR = Junior Accelerator Programme entrant
- CO = College Accelerator Programme entrant
- NG = Next Gen Accelerator Program entrant
- w/o = Walkover
- r = Retired
- d = Defaulted

=== Finals ===
Semifinals
1	(United States) Sherwood Stewart (United States) Ferdi Taygan	6	6
5	(United States) Fritz Buehning (United States) Brian Teacher	3	4
(Czechoslovakia) Stanislav Birner (Nigeria) Nduka Odizor	5	3
(United States) Mark Dickson (Sweden) Jan Gunnarsson	7	6

Final
1	(United States) Sherwood Stewart (United States) Ferdi Taygan	6	7	4
(United States) Mark Dickson (Sweden) Jan Gunnarsson	7	6	6

=== Top half ===
First round
1	(United States) S Stewart (United States) F Taygan	2	6	6
(West Germany) K Meiler (United Kingdom) B Mottram	6	3	4
(West Germany) S Hermann (West Germany) Stefan Reich	6	6
(Socialist Federal Republic of Yugoslavia) M Ostoja (Romania) F Segărceanu	3	4
(Zimbabwe) H Ismail (United States) M Vines	w/o
(United States) C Dunk (United States) S Smith
(Italy) A Panatta (Italy) C Panatta	4	3
7	(United States) C Hooper (United States) P Rennert	6	6
4	(Sweden) A Järryd (Sweden) H Simonsson	6	6
(Sweden) M Tideman (Sweden) J Windahl	2	4
(Finland) J Berner (Denmark) M Mortensen	6	6
(United States) R Druz (United States) T Siegel	4	1
(Sweden) P Hjertquist (Sweden) S Simonsson	4	7	7
(United States) B Martin (Finland) L Palin	6	5	5
(Sweden) Ulf Pettersson (Czechoslovakia) L Pimek	6	4
5	(United States) F Buehning (United States) B Teacher	7	6

Second round
1	(United States) S Stewart (United States) F Taygan	6	6
(West Germany) S Hermann (West Germany) S Reich	1	4
(Zimbabwe) H Ismail (United States) M Vines	7	4	7
7	(United States) C Hooper (United States) P Rennert	5	6	5
4	(Sweden) A Järryd (Sweden) H Simonsson	7	6
(Finland) J Berner (Denmark) M Mortensen	6	4
(Sweden) P Hjertquist (Sweden) S Simonsson	2	6	3
5	(United States) F Buehning (United States) B Teacher	6	1	6

Quarterfinals
1	(United States) S Stewart (United States) F Taygan	6	6
(Zimbabwe) H Ismail (United States) M Vines	2	1
4	(Sweden) A Järryd (Sweden) H Simonsson	6	1
5	(United States) F Buehning (United States) B Teacher	7	6

Semifinals
1	(United States) S Stewart (United States) F Taygan	6	6
5	(United States) F Buehning (United States) B Teacher	3	4

=== Bottom half ===
First round
8	(France) H Leconte (Romania) I Năstase	6	3	3
(United States) M De Palmer (United States) A Kohlberg	4	6	6
(United States) E Fromm (United States) J Lapidus	6	6	6
(India) R Krishnan (Netherlands) L Sanders	3	7	3
(Czechoslovakia) S Birner (Nigeria) N Odizor	6	6	6
(United States) L Bourne (Israel) S Glickstein	7	1	4
(Sweden) J Källqvist (Sweden) T Svensson	1	3
3	(Switzerland) H Günthardt (Czechoslovakia) T Šmíd	6	6
6	(United States) B Gottfried (United States) B Manson	6	6
(United States) T Delatte (United States) M Purcell	2	1
(Sweden) R Båthman (Sweden) Per Larsson	3	7	6
(France) C Bernelle (France) C Roger-Vasselin	6	6	4
(United States) M Dickson (Sweden) J Gunnarsson	7	6
(Sweden) B Andersson (Socialist Federal Republic of Yugoslavia) Lajos Levai	6	4
(United States) N Saviano (United Kingdom) J Smith	5	2
2	(United States) V Amaya (United States) S Denton	7	6

Second round
(United States) M De Palmer (United States) A Kohlberg	6	6
(United States) E Fromm (United States) J Lapidus	4	4
(Czechoslovakia) S Birner (Nigeria) N Odizor	7	6
3	(Switzerland) H Günthardt (Czechoslovakia) T Šmíd	6	1
6	(United States) B Gottfried (United States) B Manson	7	6
(Sweden) R Båthman (Sweden) P Larsson	6	1
(United States) M Dickson (Sweden) J Gunnarsson	6	6
2	(United States) V Amaya (United States) S Denton	4	4

Quarterfinals
(United States) M De Palmer (United States) A Kohlberg	7	3	4
(Czechoslovakia) S Birner (Nigeria) N Odizor	6	6	6
6	(United States) B Gottfried (United States) B Manson	6	4	2
(United States) M Dickson (Sweden) J Gunnarsson	3	6	6

Semifinals
(Czechoslovakia) S Birner (Nigeria) N Odizor	5	3
(United States) M Dickson (Sweden) J Gunnarsson	7	6
