= 1982 Cuore Cup =

- Date: 22–28 March
- Edition: 5th
- Category: Grand Prix (Super Series)
- Draw: 32S / 16D
- Prize money: $350,000
- Surface: Carpet / indoor
- Location: Milan, Italy
- Venue: Palazzo dello Sport

Champions

Singles
- (Argentina) Guillermo Vilas

Doubles
- (Australia) Peter McNamara / (Switzerland) Heinz Günthardt
- Milan Indoor

The 1982 Cuore Cup was a men's tennis tournament played on indoor carpet courts at the Palazzo dello Sport in Milan, Italy. The event was part of the Super Series tier of the 1982 Volvo Grand Prix circuit. It was the fifth edition of the tournament and was held from 22 March through 28 March 1982. Second-seeded Guillermo Vilas won the singles title an earned $70,000 first prize money. He entered the tournament on a wildcard after John McEnroe, the winner of the three previous editions, withdrew due to an ankle injury.

== Finals ==
=== Singles ===
(Argentina) Guillermo Vilas defeated (United States) Jimmy Connors 6–3, 6–3

- It was Vilas' 3rd singles title of the year and the 55th of his career.

=== Doubles ===
(Australia) Peter McNamara / (Switzerland) Heinz Günthardt defeated (Australia) Mark Edmondson / (United States) Sherwood Stewart 7–6, 7–6
