= 1982 Alan King Tennis Classic =

- Date: April 19–25
- Edition: 11th
- Category: Grand Prix circuit
- Draw: 32S / 16D
- Prize money: $300,000
- Surface: Hard / outdoor
- Location: Las Vegas, United States
- Venue: Caesars Palace

Champions

Singles
- (United States) Jimmy Connors

Doubles
- (United States) Ferdi Taygan / (United States) Sherwood Stewart
- Alan King Tennis Classic

The 1982 Alan King Tennis Classic, also known as the Alan King-Caesars Palace Tennis Classic, was a men's tennis tournament played on outdoor hard courts at the Caesars Palace in Las Vegas, United States. It was the 11th edition of the event and was part of the 1982 Volvo Grand Prix circuit. The tournament was held from April 19 through April 25, 1982. First-seeded Jimmy Connors won the singles title and the accompanying $60,000 first-prize money after his opponent in the final, Gene Mayer, retired due tro a sprained ankle.. It was Connors' third singles title at the tournament after 1976 and 1977.

== Finals ==
=== Singles ===
(United States) Jimmy Connors defeated (United States) Gene Mayer 5–2 ret.

- It was Connors' 3rd singles title of the year and the 92nd of his career.

=== Doubles ===
(United States) Ferdi Taygan / (United States) Sherwood Stewart defeated (Brazil) Carlos Kirmayr / (United States) Van Winitsky 7–6, 6–4
