= 1982 Robinson's Tennis Open =

- Date: April 26–May 2
- Edition: 3rd
- Category: Grand Prix
- Draw: 32S / 16D
- Prize money: $75,000
- Surface: Hard / outdoor
- Location: Oldsmar, Florida, U.S.
- Venue: East Lake Woodlands Golf and Racquet Club
- Attendance: 23,108

Champions

Singles
- (United States) Brian Gottfried

Doubles
- (United States) Tim Gullikson / (United States) Tom Gullikson
- Tampa Open

The 1982 Robinson's Tennis Open, also known as the Tampa Open, was a men's tennis tournament played on outdoor hard courts at the East Lake Woodlands Golf and Racquet Club in Oldsmar, Florida in the United States that was part of the 1982 Grand Prix circuit. It was the third edition of the tournament and took place from April 26 through May 2, 1982. Fourth-seeded Brian Gottfried won the singles title and earned $15,000 first-prize money.

== Finals ==
=== Singles ===
(United States) Brian Gottfried defeated (United States) Mike Estep 6–7^{(6–8)}, 6–2, 6–4

- It was Gottfried's 1st singles title of the year and the 23rd of his career.

=== Doubles ===
(United States) Tim Gullikson / (United States) Tom Gullikson defeated (United States) Brian Gottfried / (United States) Hank Pfister 6–2, 6–3

- It was Tim Gullikson's 1st doubles title of the year and the 8th of his career. It was Tom Gullikson's 2nd doubles title of the year and the 10th of his career.
