= 1982 U.S. Pro Indoor =

- Date: January 25–31
- Edition: 15th
- Category: Grand Prix (Super Series)
- Draw: 48S / 24D
- Prize money: $ 250,000
- Surface: Carpet / indoor
- Location: Philadelphia, PA, U.S.
- Venue: Spectrum

Champions

Singles
- (United States) John McEnroe

Doubles
- (United States) Peter Fleming / (United States) John McEnroe
- U.S. Pro Indoor

The 1982 U.S. Pro Indoor was a men's tennis tournament played on indoor carpet courts that was part of the Grand Prix Super Series of the 1982 Volvo Grand Prix. It was played at the Spectrum in Philadelphia, Pennsylvania in the United States and lasted from January 25 through January 31, 1982. First-seeded John McEnroe won the singles title.

== Finals ==
=== Singles ===
(United States) John McEnroe defeated (United States) Jimmy Connors 6–3, 6–3, 6–1

- It was McEnroe's 1st singles title of the year and the 35th of his career.

=== Doubles ===
(United States) Peter Fleming / (United States) John McEnroe defeated (United States) Sherwood Stewart / (United States) Ferdi Taygan 7–6, 6–4

- It was Fleming's 1st title of the year and the 40th of his career. It was McEnroe's 1st title of the year and the 74th of his career.

== See also ==
- Connors–McEnroe rivalry
