= 1982 German Open Championships =

- Date: 10–16 May
- Edition: 74th
- Category: Grand Prix (Super Series)
- Draw: 64S / 32D
- Prize money: $250,000
- Surface: Clay / outdoor
- Location: Hamburg, West Germany
- Venue: Am Rothenbaum

Champions

Singles
- (Spain) José Higueras

Doubles
- (Czechoslovakia) Tomáš Šmíd / (Czechoslovakia) Pavel Složil
- Grand Prix German Open

The 1982 German Open Championships was a men's tennis tournament played on outdoor clay courts at Am Rothenbaum in Hamburg, West Germany that was part of the Super Series of the 1982 Grand Prix circuit. It was the 74th edition of the event and took place from 10 May until 16 May 1982. José Higueras, who was seeded 16th, won the singles title and earned $40,000 first-prize money. He had been affected by hepatitis for over two years and it was his first singles title since the 1979 U.S. Pro Tennis Championships. Higueras played with rackets lent to him by Ivan Lendl instead of his own wooden rackets.

== Finals ==
=== Singles ===
(Spain) José Higueras defeated (Australia) Peter McNamara, 4–6, 6–7, 7–6, 6–3, 7–6

- It was Higueras' 1st singles title of the year and the 10th of his career.

=== Doubles ===
(Czechoslovakia) Tomáš Šmíd / (Czechoslovakia) Pavel Složil defeated (Sweden) Anders Järryd / (Sweden) Hans Simonsson, 6–4, 6–3
