= 1982 Stockholm Open =

- Date: 1–7 November
- Edition: 14th
- Category: Grand Prix circuit
- Draw: 64S / 32D
- Prize money: $250,000
- Surface: Hard / indoor
- Location: Stockholm, Sweden
- Venue: Kungliga tennishallen

Champions

Singles
- (France) Henri Leconte

Doubles
- (Sweden) Jan Gunnarsson / (United States) Mark Dickson
- Stockholm Open

The 1982 Stockholm Open was a men's tennis tournament played on indoor hard courts and part of the 1982 Volvo Grand Prix and took place at the Kungliga tennishallen in Stockholm, Sweden. It was the 14th edition of the tournament and was held from 1 November through 7 November 1982. Fifteenth-seeded Henri Leconte won the singles title.

== Finals ==
=== Singles ===
(France) Henri Leconte defeated (Sweden) Mats Wilander, 7–6^{(7–4)}, 6–3

=== Doubles ===
(United States) Mark Dickson / (Sweden) Jan Gunnarsson defeated (United States) Sherwood Stewart / (United States) Ferdi Taygan, 7–6, 6–7, 6–4
