= 1982 Monterrey Cup =

- Date: February 22–28
- Edition: 4th
- Category: Grand Prix (Super Series)
- Draw: 32S / 16D
- Prize money: $300,000
- Surface: Carpet / indoor
- Location: Monterrey, Mexico

Champions

Singles
- (United States) Jimmy Connors

Doubles
- (United States) Hank Pfister / (United States) Victor Amaya
- Monterrey WCT

The 1982 Monterrey Cup, also known as the Copa Monterrey, was a men's tennis tournament played on indoor carpet courts in Monterrey, Mexico. The event was part of the Super Series of the 1982 Volvo Grand Prix circuit. It was the fourth edition of the tournament and was held from February 22 through February 28, 1982. First-seeded Jimmy Connors won the singles title and earned $60,000 first-prize money.

== Finals ==
=== Singles ===
(United States) Jimmy Connors defeated (South Africa) Johan Kriek 6–2, 3–6, 6–3

- It was Connors' 1st singles title of the year and the 90th of his career.

=== Doubles ===
(United States) Hank Pfister / (United States) Victor Amaya defeated (United States) Tracy Delatte / (United States) Mel Purcell 6–3, 6–7, 6–3
