= 1982 Florence Open =

- Date: 10–16 May
- Edition: 10th
- Category: Grand Prix
- Draw: 32S / 16D
- Prize money: $75,000
- Surface: Clay / outdoor
- Location: Florence, Italy

Champions

Singles
- (United States) Vitas Gerulaitis

Doubles
- (Italy) Paolo Bertolucci / (Italy) Adriano Panatta
- ATP Florence

The 1982 Florence Open was a men's tennis tournament played on outdoor clay courts in Florence, Italy that was part of the 1982 Volvo Grand Prix circuit. It was the tenth edition of the tournament and was played from 10 May until 16 May 1982. Second-seeded Vitas Gerulaitis won the singles title.

== Finals ==
=== Singles ===
(United States) Vitas Gerulaitis defeated (Sweden) Stefan Simonsson 4–6, 6–3, 6–1

- It was Gerulaitis' 2nd singles title of the year and the 21st of his career.

=== Doubles ===
(Italy) Paolo Bertolucci / (Italy) Adriano Panatta defeated (United States) Tony Giammalva / (United States) Sammy Giammalva 7–6, 6–1
