= 1982 Dutch Open (tennis) =

- Date: 19–25 July
- Edition: 25th
- Category: Grand Prix
- Draw: 32S / 16D
- Prize money: $75,000
- Surface: Clay / outdoor
- Location: Hilversum, Netherlands
- Venue: 't Melkhuisje

Champions

Singles
- (Hungary) Balázs Taróczy

Doubles
- (Czechoslovakia) Jan Kodeš / (Czechoslovakia) Tomáš Šmíd
- Dutch Open

The 1982 Dutch Open was a Grand Prix tennis tournament staged in Hilversum, Netherlands. The tournament was played on outdoor clay courts and was held from 19 July until 25 July 1982. It was the 25th edition of the tournament. Third-seeded Balázs Taróczy won his fifth consecutive title at the event and his sixth in total.

== Finals ==
=== Singles ===
(Hungary) Balázs Taróczy defeated (United Kingdom) Buster Mottram 7–6^{(7–5)}, 6–7^{(3–7)}, 6–3, 7–6^{(7–5)}

- It was Taróczy's 2nd singles title of the year and the 13th and last of his career.

=== Doubles ===
(Czechoslovakia) Jan Kodeš / (Czechoslovakia) Tomáš Šmíd defeated (Switzerland) Heinz Günthardt / (Hungary) Balázs Taróczy 7–6, 6–4
