= 1980 Swiss Indoors =

- Date: 13–19 October
- Edition: 11th
- Category: Grand Prix
- Draw: 32S / 16D
- Prize money: $75,000
- Surface: Hard / indoor
- Location: Basel, Switzerland

Champions

Singles
- (Czechoslovakia) Ivan Lendl

Doubles
- (South Africa) Kevin Curren / (United States) Steve Denton
| ← 1979 · | Swiss Indoors | · 1981 → |

The 1980 Swiss Indoors, also known as the European Open Indoor Championships, was a men's tennis tournament played on indoor hard courts that was part of the 1980 Volvo Grand Prix. It was the 11th edition of the tournament and was played in Basel, Switzerland from 13 October through 19 October 1980. Second-seeded Ivan Lendl won the singles title.

== Finals ==
=== Singles ===
(Czechoslovakia) Ivan Lendl defeated (Sweden) Björn Borg 6–3, 6–2, 5–7, 0–6, 6–4

- It was Lendl's 4th singles title of the year and of his career.

=== Doubles ===
(South Africa) Kevin Curren / (United States) Steve Denton defeated (South Africa) Bob Hewitt / (South Africa) Frew McMillan 6–7, 6–4, 6–4
