= 1982 Swiss Indoors =

Tennis tournament

- Date: 11–17 October
- Edition: 14th
- Category: Grand Prix
- Draw: 32S / 16D
- Prize money: $100,000
- Surface: Hard / indoor
- Location: Basel, Switzerland
- Venue: St. Jakobshalle

Champions

Singles
- (France) Yannick Noah

Doubles
- (France) Henri Leconte / (France) Yannick Noah
← 1981 ·	Swiss Indoors	· 1983 →

The 1982 Swiss Indoors was a men's tennis tournament played on indoor hard courts at the St. Jakobshalle in Basel, Switzerland that was part of the 1982 Volvo Grand Prix. It was the 14th edition of the tournament and was held from 11 October through 17 October 1982. First-seeded Yannick Noah won the singles title.

== Finals ==
=== Singles ===
(France) Yannick Noah defeated (Sweden) Mats Wilander 6–4, 6–2, 6–3

- It was Noah's 3rd singles title of the year and the 10th of his career.

=== Doubles ===
(France) Henri Leconte / (France) Yannick Noah defeated (United States) Fritz Buehning / (Czechoslovakia) Pavel Složil 6–2, 6–2
