= 1982 U.S. Pro Indoor – Singles =

Singles
- 1982 U.S. Pro Indoor

Final
- Champion: (United States) John McEnroe
- Runner-up: (United States) Jimmy Connors
- Score: 6–3, 6–3, 6–1

Details
- Draw: 32
- Seeds: 8

Events
| Singles | Doubles |
- U.S. Pro Indoor

Roscoe Tanner was the defending champion, but lost in the second round this year.

John McEnroe won the title, defeating Jimmy Connors 6–3, 6–3, 6–1 in the final.

== Seeds ==
1. (United States) John McEnroe (champion)
2. (United States) Jimmy Connors (final)
3. (United States) Vitas Gerulaitis (semifinals)
4. (United States) Roscoe Tanner (second round)
5. (South Africa) Johan Kriek (first round)
6. (United States) Sandy Mayer (quarterfinals)
7. (Poland) Wojtek Fibak (first round)
8. (United States) Brian Gottfried (first round)

== Draw ==
Key

- Q = Qualifier
- WC = Wild card
- LL = Lucky loser
- Alt = Alternate
- ITF = ITF entry
- PR = Protected ranking
- SR = Special ranking
- SE = Special exempt
- JE = Junior exempt
- JR = Junior Accelerator Programme entrant
- CO = College Accelerator Programme entrant
- NG = Next Gen Accelerator Program entrant
- w/o = Walkover
- r = Retired
- d = Defaulted

=== Finals ===
Semifinals
1 | (United States) John McEnroe | 6 | 6 | 6
3 | (United States) Vitas Gerulaitis | 1 | 2 | 4
Q | (United States) Chip Hooper | 6 | 6 | 3 | 2
2 | (United States) Jimmy Connors | 3 | 7 | 6 | 6

Final
1 | (United States) John McEnroe | 6 | 6 | 6
2 | (United States) Jimmy Connors | 3 | 3 | 1

=== Top half ===
First round
1 | (United States) J McEnroe | 6 | 6
Q | (United States) T Delatte | 3 | 1
(West Germany) R Gehring | 7 | 6
Q | (France) P Portes | 6 | 1
(United States) T Moor | 2 | 6 | 6
(United States) Ti Gullikson | 6 | 4 | 3
(United States) V Van Patten | 6 | 4
6 | (United States) S Mayer | 7 | 6
3 | (United States) V Gerulaitis | 6 | 6
(United States) S Giammalva Jr. | 3 | 1
(United States) S Denton | 6 | 3 | 6
(India) R Krishnan | 2 | 6 | 2
(United States) F Buehning | 4 | 6 | 4
(United States) V Winitsky | 6 | 3 | 6
(South Africa) K Curren | 6 | 6
8 | (United States) B Gottfried | 4 | 4

Second round
1 | (United States) J McEnroe | 5 | 6 | 6
(West Germany) R Gehring | 7 | 1 | 4
(United States) T Moor | 6 | 4
6 | (United States) S Mayer | 7 | 6
3 | (United States) V Gerulaitis | 6 | 6
(United States) S Denton | 2 | 4
(United States) V Winitsky | 6 | 1 | 4
(South Africa) K Curren | 3 | 6 | 6

Quarterfinals
1 | (United States) J McEnroe | 6 | 6
6 | (United States) S Mayer | 4 | 4
3 | (United States) V Gerulaitis | 6 | 6
(South Africa) K Curren | 3 | 2

Semifinals
1 | (United States) J McEnroe | 6 | 6 | 6
3 | (United States) V Gerulaitis | 1 | 2 | 4

=== Bottom half ===
First round
5 | (South Africa) J Kriek | 2 | 6
(United States) T Mayotte | 6 | 7
(United States) To Gullikson | 6 | 6 | 2
(United States) J Sadri | 4 | 7 | 6
(United States) P Fleming | 2 | 6 | 3
Q | (United States) C Hooper | 6 | 3 | 6
(United States) D Stockton | 2 | 6 | 5
4 | (United States) R Tanner | 6 | 4 | 7
7 | (Poland) W Fibak | 4 | 3
(United States) P Rennert | 6 | 6
Q | (United Kingdom) J Lloyd | 4 | 3
(Ecuador) A Gómez | 6 | 6
(United States) J Borowiak | 6 | 4 | 7
(United States) H Solomon | 4 | 6 | 5
(France) T Tulasne | 5 | 2
2 | (United States) J Connors | 7 | 6

Second round
(United States) T Mayotte | 7 | 4 | 4
(United States) J Sadri | 5 | 6 | 6
Q | (United States) C Hooper | 6 | 7
4 | (United States) R Tanner | 4 | 6
(United States) P Rennert | 2 | 4
(Ecuador) A Gómez | 6 | 6
(United States) J Borowiak | 2 | 0
2 | (United States) J Connors | 6 | 6

Quarterfinals
(United States) J Sadri | 7 | 6 | 3
Q | (United States) C Hooper | 5 | 7 | 6
(Ecuador) A Gómez | 5 | 6
2 | (United States) J Connors | 7 | 7

Semifinals
Q | (United States) C Hooper | 6 | 6 | 3 | 2
2 | (United States) J Connors | 3 | 7 | 6 | 6

== See also ==
- Connors–McEnroe rivalry
