= 1982 U.S. Pro Indoor – Doubles =

Doubles
- 1982 U.S. Pro Indoor

Final
- Champions: (United States) Peter Fleming (United States) John McEnroe
- Runners-up: (United States) Sherwood Stewart (United States) Ferdi Taygan
- Score: 7–6, 6–4

Details
- Draw: 16
- Seeds: 4

Events
Singles	Doubles
- U.S. Pro Indoor

Marty Riessen and Sherwood Stewart were the defending champions, but Riessen did not participate this year. Stewart partnered Ferdi Taygan, finishing runner-up.

Peter Fleming and John McEnroe won the title, defeating Stewart and Taygan 7–6, 6–4 in the final.

== Seeds ==
1. (United States) Peter Fleming / (United States) John McEnroe (champions)
2. (United States) Sherwood Stewart / (United States) Ferdi Taygan (final)
3. (United States) Fritz Buehning / (South Africa) Kevin Curren (first round)
4. (United States) Victor Amaya / (United States) Steve Denton (semifinals)

== Draw ==
Key

- Q = Qualifier
- WC = Wild card
- LL = Lucky loser
- Alt = Alternate
- ITF = ITF entry
- PR = Protected ranking
- SR = Special ranking
- SE = Special exempt
- JE = Junior exempt
- JR = Junior Accelerator Programme entrant
- CO = College Accelerator Programme entrant
- NG = Next Gen Accelerator Program entrant
- w/o = Walkover
- r = Retired
- d = Defaulted

=== Draw ===
First round
1	(United States) P Fleming (United States) J McEnroe	6	7
(United States) S Mayer (South Africa) F McMillan	3	5
(United States) B Gottfried (United States) D Stockton	6	7
(Poland) W Fibak (United Kingdom) J Lloyd	4	6
3	(United States) F Buehning (South Africa) K Curren	7	6	3
(United States) P Rennert (United States) R Tanner	6	7	6
(United States) S Giammalva Jr. (United States) T Mayotte	6	6	6
(France) G Moretton (France) T Tulasne	7	3	1
(United States) Ti Gullikson (United States) To Gullikson	3	7	7
(United States) J Borowiak (United States) T Delatte	6	6	6
4	(United States) V Amaya (United States) S Denton	7	6
(Israel) S Krulevitz (United States) F McNair	6	4
(Australia) S Ball (Australia) R Case	6	6	6
(United States) T Moor (United States) J Sadri	7	2	1
(West Germany) R Gehring (France) P Portes	2	7	6
2	(United States) S Stewart (United States) F Taygan	6	6	7

Quarterfinals
1	(United States) P Fleming (United States) J McEnroe	4	6	6
(United States) B Gottfried (United States) D Stockton	6	2	3
(United States) P Rennert (United States) R Tanner	6	4	6
(United States) S Giammalva Jr. (United States) T Mayotte	3	6	7
(United States) Ti Gullikson (United States) To Gullikson	5	3
4	(United States) V Amaya (United States) S Denton	7	6
(Australia) S Ball (Australia) R Case	3	2
2	(United States) S Stewart (United States) F Taygan	6	6

Semifinals
1	(United States) P Fleming (United States) J McEnroe	7	6
(United States) S Giammalva Jr. (United States) T Mayotte	6	3
4	(United States) V Amaya (United States) S Denton	6	6
2	(United States) S Stewart (United States) F Taygan	7	7

Final
1	(United States) P Fleming (United States) J McEnroe	7	6
2	(United States) S Stewart (United States) F Taygan	6	4
