= 1981 German Open Championships =

- Date: 11–17 May
- Edition: 73rd
- Category: Grand Prix (Super Series)
- Draw: 64S / 32D
- Prize money: $200,000
- Surface: Clay / outdoor
- Location: Hamburg, West Germany
- Venue: Am Rothenbaum

Champions

Singles
- (Australia) Peter McNamara

Doubles
- (Ecuador) Andrés Gómez / (Chile) Hans Gildemeister
- Grand Prix German Open

The 1981 German Open Championships was a men's tennis tournament played on outdoor clay courts at Am Rothenbaum in Hamburg, West Germany that was part of the Super Series of the 1981 Grand Prix circuit. It was the 73rd edition of the event and took place from 11 May until 17 May 1981. Sixth-seeded Peter McNamara won the singles title after a win against first-seeded Jimmy Connors in a rain-interrupted final that was played over two days.

== Finals ==
=== Singles ===
(Australia) Peter McNamara defeated (United States) Jimmy Connors, 7–6, 6–1, 4–6, 6–4

- It was McNamara' 1st singles title of the year and the 3rd of his career.

=== Doubles ===
(Ecuador) Andrés Gómez / (Chile) Hans Gildemeister defeated (Australia) Peter McNamara / (Australia) Paul McNamee, 6–4, 3–6, 6–4
