= 1983 German Open =

Tennis tournament

- Date: 9–14 May
- Edition: 75th
- Category: Grand Prix
- Draw: 56S / 28D
- Prize money: $250,000
- Surface: Clay / outdoor
- Location: Hamburg, West Germany
- Venue: Am Rothenbaum

Champions

Singles
- (France) Yannick Noah

Doubles
- (Switzerland) Heinz Günthardt / (Hungary) Balázs Taróczy
- Grand Prix German Open

The 1983 German Open was a men's tennis tournament played on outdoor clay courts at Am Rothenbaum in Hamburg, West Germany that was part of the 1983 Grand Prix circuit. It was the 75th edition of the event and took place from 9 May through 14 May 1983. Sixth-seeded Yannick Noah won the singles title.

== Finals ==
=== Singles ===
(France) Yannick Noah defeated (Spain) José Higueras, 3–6, 7–5, 6–2, 6–0

- It was Noah's 2nd singles title of the year and the 13th of his career.

=== Doubles ===
(Switzerland) Heinz Günthardt / (Hungary) Balázs Taróczy defeated (Australia) Mark Edmondson / (United States) Brian Gottfried, 7–6, 4–6, 6–4
