= José López-Maeso =

Spanish tennis player (born 1956)

- Country (sports): Spain
- Residence: Madrid, Spain
- Born: 24 December 1956 (age 68); Puertollano, Ciudad Real, Spain
- Height: 1.72 m (5 ft 7 1/2 in)
- Turned pro: 1979
- Plays: Right-handed (two-handed backhand)
- Prize money: $227,600

Singles
- Career record: 66–93
- Career titles: 0
- Highest ranking: No. 63 (1 February 1982)

Grand Slam singles results
- French Open: 2R (1985, 1986)
- Wimbledon: 1R (1981, 1982, 1985)
- US Open: 1R (1982)

Doubles
- Career record: 36–73
- Career titles: 0
- Highest ranking: No. 52 (22 June 1987)

José López-Maeso Urquiza (born 24 December 1956) is a Spanish former professional tennis player.

Urquiza currently works for Canal+ Spain as a TV commentator for tennis matches. He also has his own tennis club in Puertollano, which is called Real Club de Tenis López-Maeso.
