= Christophe Roger-Vasselin =

French tennis player

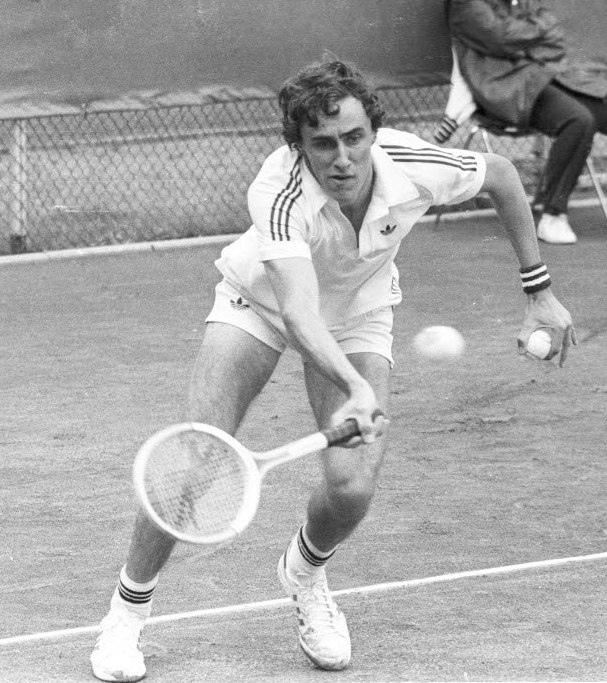
- Christophe Roger-Vasselin (1977)
- Country (sports): France
- Residence: Paris, France
- Born: 8 July 1957 (age 69) London, England
- Height: 1.88 m (6 ft 2 in)
- Turned pro: 1976
- Retired: 1985
- Plays: Right-handed (one-handed backhand)
- Prize money: $8,937

Singles
- Career record: 161-159
- Career titles: 7
- Highest ranking: No. 29 (20 June 1983)

Grand Slam singles results
- French Open: SF (1983)
- Wimbledon: 2R (1981)
- US Open: 2R (1981)

Doubles
- Career record: 53–87
- Career titles: 2
- Highest ranking: No. 266 (2 January 1984)

Grand Slam doubles results
- French Open: 3R (1978)
- Wimbledon: 2R (1981)

Team competitions
- Davis Cup: SF^{Eu} (1980)

Christophe Roger-Vasselin (French pronunciation: [kʁistɔf ʁɔʒe vaslɛ̃]; born 8 July 1957) is a French former professional tennis player.

Notably in his singles career, he reached the French Open semifinals in 1983, beating No. 1 seed Jimmy Connors in the quarterfinals, but lost to eventual champion Yannick Noah. The right-hander reached his highest singles ATP ranking on 20 June 1983, when he became world No. 29.

Roger-Vasselin won two doubles titles during his professional career.

In the autumn of 1977 he briefly played with a double-strung racket, the so-called spaghetti racket, with which he reached the final of the Porée Cup in Paris. The racket was banned shortly afterwards.

His son Édouard Roger-Vasselin followed him into the profession and is currently active on the ATP Tour, and went on to win the French Open in doubles in 2014.

== Career finals ==
=== Singles (2 losses) ===
Result	W/L	Date	Tournament	Surface	Opponent	Score
Loss	0–1	Sep 1977	Paris, France	Clay	(Argentina) Guillermo Vilas	1–6, 1–6, 6–7
Loss	0–2	May 1981	Munich, Germany	Clay	(New Zealand) Chris Lewis	6–4, 2–6, 6–2, 1–6, 1–6

=== Doubles (2 wins) ===
Result	W/L	Date	Tournament	Surface	Partner	Opponents	Score
Win	1–0	Sep 1977	Paris, France	Clay	(France) Jacques Thamin	(Romania) Ilie Năstase (Romania) Ion Țiriac	6–2, 4–6, 6–3
Win	2–0	Jun 1980	Vienna, Austria	Clay	(Italy) Gianni Ocleppo	(Czechoslovakia) Pavel Složil (Czechoslovakia) Tomáš Šmíd	walkover
