= 1983 Torneo Godó – Doubles =

Doubles
- 1983 Torneo Godó

Final
- Champions: (Sweden) Anders Järryd (Sweden) Hans Simonsson
- Runners-up: (United States) Jim Gurfein (United States) Erick Iskersky
- Score: 7–5, 6–3

Details
- Draw: 32
- Seeds: 8

Events
Singles	Doubles
← 1982 ·	Barcelona Open	· 1984 →

Anders Järryd and Hans Simonsson became 3-time consecutive champions after defeating Jim Gurfein and Erick Iskersky 7–5, 6–3 in the final.

== Seeds ==
1. (Czechoslovakia) Pavel Složil / (Czechoslovakia) Tomáš Šmíd (semifinals)
2. (Sweden) Anders Järryd / (Sweden) Hans Simonsson (champions)
3. (Sweden) Joakim Nyström / (Sweden) Mats Wilander (first round)
4. (Switzerland) Heinz Günthardt / (Switzerland) Markus Günthardt (semifinals)
5. (South Africa) Eddie Edwards / (South Africa) Tian Viljoen (second round)
6. (Peru) Pablo Arraya / (Ecuador) Andrés Gómez (quarterfinals)
7. (Sweden) Stefan Simonsson / (Sweden) Magnus Tideman (first round)
8. (Spain) Sergio Casal / (Italy) Claudio Panatta (quarterfinals)

== Draw ==
=== Key ===
- Q = Qualifier
- WC = Wild card
- LL = Lucky loser
- Alt = Alternate
- SE = Special exempt
- PR = Protected ranking
- ITF = ITF entry
- JE = Junior exempt
- w/o = Walkover
- r = Retired
- d = Defaulted
- SR = Special ranking

=== Finals ===
Semifinals
1	(Czechoslovakia) Pavel Složil (Czechoslovakia) Tomáš Šmíd	6	2	2
(United States) Jim Gurfein (United States) Erick Iskersky	3	6	6
4	(Switzerland) Heinz Günthardt (Switzerland) Markus Günthardt	6	3	2
2	(Sweden) Anders Järryd (Sweden) Hans Simonsson	2	6	6

Final
(United States) Jim Gurfein (United States) Erick Iskersky	5	3
2	(Sweden) Anders Järryd (Sweden) Hans Simonsson	7	6

=== Top half ===
First round
1	(Czechoslovakia) P Slozil (Czechoslovakia) T Smid	6	7
(Spain) A Tous (Colombia) J Velasco	2	6
(Chile) R Acuña (Chile) B Prajoux	6	5	6
(United States) B Csipkay (South Africa) M Myburg	4	7	4
(West Germany) A Maurer (Czechoslovakia) L Pimek	6	2	6
(Spain) JC Andrade (Spain) R Sánchez Rueda	1	6	2
(Argentina) F Yunis (Argentina) J Carlos Yunis	3	4
5	(South Africa) E Edwards (South Africa) T Viljoen	6	6
3	(Sweden) J Nyström (Sweden) M Wilander	2	1
(United States) J Gurfein (United States) E Iskersky	6	6
(Bolivia) R Benavides (Argentina) G Tiberti	6	6
(Czechoslovakia) M Mečíř (United States) A Scheinman	2	1
(Brazil) I Camus (Peru) F Maynetto	6	6
(Spain) M Mir (Spain) E Sánchez	4	4
(Germany) D Keretić (Switzerland) R Stadler	1	3
8	(Spain) S Casal (Italy) C Panatta	6	6

Second round
1	(Czechoslovakia) P Slozil (Czechoslovakia) T Smid	6	6
(Chile) R Acuña (Chile) B Prajoux	3	1
(West Germany) A Maurer (Czechoslovakia) L Pimek	6	6
5	(South Africa) E Edwards (South Africa) T Viljoen	4	4
(United States) J Gurfein (United States) E Iskersky	7	6
(Bolivia) R Benavides (Argentina) G Tiberti	6	2
(Brazil) I Camus (Peru) F Maynetto	2	4
8	(Spain) S Casal (Italy) C Panatta	6	6

Quarterfinals
1	(Czechoslovakia) P Slozil (Czechoslovakia) T Smid	6	7	6
(West Germany) A Maurer (Czechoslovakia) L Pimek	7	6	3
(United States) J Gurfein (United States) E Iskersky	2	6	8
8	(Spain) S Casal (Italy) C Panatta	6	3	6

Semifinals
1	(Czechoslovakia) P Slozil (Czechoslovakia) T Smid	6	2	2
(United States) J Gurfein (United States) E Iskersky	3	6	6

=== Bottom half ===
First round
6	(Peru) P Arraya (Ecuador) A Gómez	6	6
(Argentina) C Castellan (Uruguay) D Pérez	3	3
(Argentina) A Gattiker (Spain) J Lopez-Maeso	6	7
(Germany) U Fischer (Spain) R Vizcaíno	2	6
(Spain) J Avendaño (Chile) A Pierola	4	6	6
(Spain) J Bardou (Spain) F Soler	6	4	3
(Germany) R Gehring (Spain) A Gimenez	3	6	2
4	(Switzerland) H Gunthardt (Switzerland) M Günthardt	6	2	6
7	(Sweden) S Simonsson (Sweden) M Tideman	6	4	3
(Spain) L Fargas (Spain) G Urpí	0	6	6
(Sweden) J Gunnarsson (South Africa) S van der Merwe	6	6
(Romania) I Țiriac (Argentina) G Vilas	2	2
(South Africa) R Venter (United States) B Willenborg	6	6
(Spain) J Colás (Chile) M Morales	2	1
(Spain) E Osta (Uruguay) H Roverano	1	4
2	(Sweden) A Järryd (Sweden) H Simonsson	6	6

Second round
6	(Peru) P Arraya (Ecuador) A Gómez	7	6
(Argentina) A Gattiker (Spain) J Lopez-Maeso	6	4
(Spain) J Avendaño (Chile) A Pierola	3	6
4	(Switzerland) H Gunthardt (Switzerland) M Günthardt	6	7
(Spain) L Fargas (Spain) G Urpí	4	3
(Sweden) J Gunnarsson (South Africa) S van der Merwe	6	6
(South Africa) R Venter (United States) B Willenborg	6	2	5
2	(Sweden) A Järryd (Sweden) H Simonsson	4	6	7

Quarterfinals
6	(Peru) P Arraya (Ecuador) A Gómez	6	6
4	(Switzerland) H Gunthardt (Switzerland) M Günthardt	7	7
(Sweden) J Gunnarsson (South Africa) S van der Merwe	0	2
2	(Sweden) A Järryd (Sweden) H Simonsson	6	6

Semifinals
4	(Switzerland) H Gunthardt (Switzerland) M Günthardt	6	3	2
2	(Sweden) A Järryd (Sweden) H Simonsson	2	6	6
