= 1984 Torneo Godó – Singles =

Singles
- 1984 Torneo Godó

Final
- Champion: (Sweden) Mats Wilander
- Runner-up: (Sweden) Joakim Nyström
- Score: 7–6, 6–4, 0–6, 6–2

Details
- Draw: 64 (5WC/8Q)
- Seeds: 16

Events
Singles	Doubles
← 1983 ·	Barcelona Open	· 1985 →

Mats Wilander defeated his compatriot Joakim Nyström 7–6, 6–4, 0–6, 6–2 and won his third consecutive title at Barcelona.

== Seeds ==
1. (Sweden) Mats Wilander (champion)
2. (United States) Jimmy Arias (quarterfinals)
3. (Sweden) Henrik Sundström (semifinals)
4. (Czechoslovakia) Tomáš Šmíd (first round)
5. (Spain) Juan Aguilera (first round)
6. (Sweden) Joakim Nyström (final)
7. (Argentina) Guillermo Vilas (second round)
8. (Spain) José Higueras (first round)
9. (Italy) Francesco Cancellotti (second round)
10. (Czechoslovakia) Libor Pimek (second round)
11. (Paraguay) Víctor Pecci (third round)
12. (Peru) Pablo Arraya (second round)
13. (Uruguay) Diego Pérez (second round)
14. (Czechoslovakia) Miloslav Mečíř (quarterfinals)
15. (United States) Blaine Willenborg (first round)
16. (France) Thierry Tulasne (third round, retired)

== Draw ==
=== Key ===
- Q = Qualifier
- WC = Wild card
- LL = Lucky loser
- Alt = Alternate
- SE = Special exempt
- PR = Protected ranking
- ITF = ITF entry
- JE = Junior exempt
- w/o = Walkover
- r = Retired
- d = Defaulted
- SR = Special ranking

=== Finals ===
Quarterfinals
1	(Sweden) Mats Wilander	3	6	7
(Argentina) Martín Jaite	6	3	5
3	(Sweden) Henrik Sundström	0	6	6
(Spain) Alberto Tous	6	2	2
14	(Czechoslovakia) Miloslav Mečíř	4	2
(West Germany) Hans Schwaier	6	6
6	(Sweden) Joakim Nyström	2	6	16
2	(United States) Jimmy Arias	6	4	14

Semifinals
1	(Sweden) Mats Wilander	0	7	6
3	(Sweden) Henrik Sundström	6	6	1
(West Germany) Hans Schwaier	6	6	1
6	(Sweden) Joakim Nyström	7	4	6

Final
1	(Sweden) Mats Wilander	7	6	0	6
6	(Sweden) Joakim Nyström	6	4	6	2

=== Top half ===
==== Section 1 ====
First round
1	(Sweden) M Wilander	6	6
Q	(Spain) D de Miguel	3	2
(Sweden) K Carlsson	6	6
(Switzerland) R Stadler	4	3
(France) P Portes	5	6	1
Q	(United States) E Adams	7	3	6
(Argentina) R Argüello	7	3	9
11	(Paraguay) V Pecci	6	6	11
15	(United States) B Willenborg	2	3
(Argentina) M Jaite	6	6
(Argentina) F Yunis	7	4	6
(Spain) E Sánchez	6	6	3
(Sweden) S Simonsson	6	3	6
(Spain) G Urpí	0	6	2
WC	(Spain) J Soler	6	6
5	(Spain) J Aguilera	4	4

Second round
1	(Sweden) M Wilander	6	6
(Sweden) K Carlsson	3	3
Q	(United States) E Adams	0	3
11	(Paraguay) V Pecci	6	6
(Argentina) M Jaite	6	6
(Argentina) F Yunis	4	3
(Sweden) S Simonsson	7	7
WC	(Spain) J Soler	6	6

Third round
1	(Sweden) M Wilander	7	4	10
11	(Paraguay) V Pecci	6	6	8
(Argentina) M Jaite	6	6
(Sweden) S Simonsson	4	3

Quarterfinals
1	(Sweden) M Wilander	3	6	7
(Argentina) M Jaite	6	3	5

==== Section 2 ====
First round
3	(Sweden) H Sundström	3	6	6
(United States) J Brown	6	2	4
(Italy) C Panatta	4	4
(Czechoslovakia) J Navrátil	6	6
(Socialist Federal Republic of Yugoslavia) S Živojinović	2	3
(Czechoslovakia) K Nováček	6	6
WC	(Spain) F Soler	2	1
13	(Uruguay) D Pérez	6	6
10	(Czechoslovakia) L Pimek	7	1	6
Q	(Spain) R Vizcaíno	6	6	4
(New Zealand) B Derlin	2	4
(Spain) A Tous	6	6
(West Germany) C Zipf	3	3
(Czechoslovakia) P Složil	6	6
Q	(Argentina) H de la Peña	3	6	6
8	(Spain) J Higueras	6	3	4

Second round
3	(Sweden) H Sundström	6	6
(Czechoslovakia) J Navrátil	0	0
(Czechoslovakia) K Nováček	3	7	6
13	(Uruguay) D Pérez	6	5	4
10	(Czechoslovakia) L Pimek	6	2	13
(Spain) A Tous	3	6	15
(Czechoslovakia) P Složil	2	0
Q	(Argentina) H de la Peña	6	6

Third round
3	(Sweden) H Sundström	7	7
(Czechoslovakia) K Nováček	6	6
(Spain) A Tous	6	7
Q	(Argentina) H de la Peña	1	5

Quarterfinals
3	(Sweden) H Sundström	0	6	6
(Spain) A Tous	6	2	2

=== Bottom half ===
==== Section 3 ====
First round
7	(Argentina) G Vilas	6	6
(West Germany) HD Beutel	3	2
(Argentina) M Ingaramo	6	7
(United States) M Flur	1	5
(Argentina) G Rivas	6	3	5
Q	(Argentina) C Miniussi	4	6	7
(Spain) J Avendaño	4	7	5
14	(Czechoslovakia) M Mečíř	6	5	7
16	(France) T Tulasne	6	6
Q	(West Germany) Olivier Freund	1	4
WC	(Spain) L Fargas	2	0
(Spain) J Arrese	6	6
(Argentina) C Castellan	6	6
(West Germany) D Keretić	2	3
(West Germany) H Schwaier	4	6	6
4	(Czechoslovakia) T Šmíd	6	1	4

Second round
7	(Argentina) G Vilas	3	2
(Argentina) M Ingaramo	6	6
Q	(Argentina) C Miniussi	3	4
14	(Czechoslovakia) M Mečíř	6	6
16	(France) T Tulasne	6	7
(Spain) J Arrese	1	6
(Argentina) C Castellan	4	0
(West Germany) H Schwaier	6	6

Third round
(Argentina) M Ingaramo	5	0
14	(Czechoslovakia) M Mečíř	7	6
16	(France) T Tulasne	3	1^{r}
(West Germany) H Schwaier	6	4

Quarterfinals
14	(Czechoslovakia) M Mečíř	4	2
(West Germany) H Schwaier	6	6

==== Section 4 ====
First round
6	(Sweden) J Nyström	7	6
(Argentina) A Ganzábal	5	3
(West Germany) E Jelen	6	4	6
WC	(Spain) Á Giménez	4	6	4
Q	(Canada) M Wostenholme	4	6	6
(West Germany) B Becker	6	4	3
Q	(United States) B Nealon	3	2
12	(Peru) P Arraya	6	6
9	(Italy) F Cancellotti	7	7
(Sweden) M Tideman	6	6
(Mexico) F Maciel	6	1	0
(Australia) T Allan	4	6	6
(Spain) F Luna	6	4	4
WC	(Spain) J Bardou	0	6	6
(West Germany) A Maurer	3	5
2	(United States) J Arias	6	7

Second round
6	(Sweden) J Nyström	6	6
(West Germany) E Jelen	3	4
Q	(Canada) M Wostenholme	7	6	9
12	(Peru) P Arraya	6	7	7
9	(Italy) F Cancellotti	1	6	4
(Australia) T Allan	6	4	6
WC	(Spain) J Bardou	4	3
2	(United States) J Arias	6	6

Third round
6	(Sweden) J Nyström	6	6
Q	(Canada) M Wostenholme	2	2
(Australia) T Allan	6	4	4
2	(United States) J Arias	2	6	6

Quarterfinals
6	(Sweden) J Nyström	2	6	16
2	(United States) J Arias	6	4	14
