= 1984 Torneo Godó – Doubles =

Doubles
- 1984 Torneo Godó

Final
- Champions: (Czechoslovakia) Pavel Složil (Czechoslovakia) Tomáš Šmíd
- Runners-up: (Argentina) Martín Jaite (Paraguay) Víctor Pecci
- Score: 6–2, 6–0

Details
- Draw: 32
- Seeds: 8

Events
| Singles | Doubles |
| ← 1983 · | Barcelona Open | · 1985 → |

Anders Järryd and Hans Simonsson were the three-time defending champions, but Järryd did not compete this year. Simonsson teamed up with Magnus Tideman and lost in the quarterfinals to Lorenzo Fargas and Gabriel Urpí.

Pavel Složil and Tomáš Šmíd won the title by defeating Martín Jaite and Víctor Pecci 6–2, 6–0 in the final.

== Seeds ==
1. (Czechoslovakia) Pavel Složil / (Czechoslovakia) Tomáš Šmíd (champions)
2. (Czechoslovakia) Libor Pimek / (United States) Blaine Willenborg (second round)
3. (Sweden) Joakim Nyström / (Sweden) Mats Wilander (quarterfinals)
4. (Italy) Claudio Panatta / (Sweden) Henrik Sundström (second round)
5. (Sweden) Stefan Simonsson / (Sweden) Magnus Tideman (quarterfinals)
6. (West Germany) Eric Jelen / (West Germany) Andreas Maurer (first round)
7. (Peru) Pablo Arraya / (Spain) Sergio Casal (quarterfinals)
8. (Argentina) Martín Jaite / (Paraguay) Víctor Pecci (final)

== Draw ==
Key

- Q = Qualifier
- WC = Wild card
- LL = Lucky loser
- Alt = Alternate
- ITF = ITF entry
- PR = Protected ranking
- SR = Special ranking
- SE = Special exempt
- JE = Junior exempt
- JR = Junior Accelerator Programme entrant
- CO = College Accelerator Programme entrant
- NG = Next Gen Accelerator Program entrant
- w/o = Walkover
- r = Retired
- d = Defaulted

=== Finals ===
Semifinals
1 | (Czechoslovakia) Pavel Složil (Czechoslovakia) Tomáš Šmíd | 6 | 6
(United States) Egan Adams (United States) Marc Flur | 2 | 4
8 | (Argentina) Martín Jaite (Paraguay) Víctor Pecci | 3 | 6 | 6
(Spain) Lorenzo Fargas (Spain) Gabriel Urpí | 6 | 3 | 2

Final
1 | (Czechoslovakia) Pavel Složil (Czechoslovakia) Tomáš Šmíd | 6 | 6
8 | (Argentina) Martín Jaite (Paraguay) Víctor Pecci | 2 | 0

=== Top half ===
First round
1 | (Czechoslovakia) P Složil (Czechoslovakia) T Šmíd | 6 | 6
(West Germany) U Fischer (West Germany) Dirk Vestweber | 0 | 3
(West Germany) HD Beutel (West Germany) C Zipf | 4 | 6 | 7
(United States) J Arias (Spain) J Higueras | 6 | 2 | 5
(Spain) E Sánchez (Switzerland) R Stadler | 7 | 6
(Spain) JA Rodríguez (Spain) Ricardo Sánchez Rueda | 6 | 4
(Argentina) M Ingaramo (Mexico) F Maciel | 6 | 6 | 6
6 | (West Germany) E Jelen (West Germany) A Maurer | 7 | 3 | 2
4 | (Italy) C Panatta (Sweden) H Sundström | 7 | 6
(France) T Allan (Spain) F Soler | 5 | 1
(United States) E Adams (United States) M Flur | 6 | 6
(Spain) E Osta (United States) A Scheinman | 0 | 4
(New Zealand) B Derlin (West Germany) D Keretić | 6 | 6
(Spain) J Arrese (Chile) A Pierola | 1 | 4
(Peru) F Maynetto (Spain) R Vizcaíno | 3 | 4
7 | (Peru) P Arraya (Spain) S Casal | 6 | 6

Second round
1 | (Czechoslovakia) P Složil (Czechoslovakia) T Šmíd | 6 | 3 | 6
(West Germany) HD Beutel (West Germany) C Zipf | 3 | 6 | 3
(Spain) E Sánchez (Switzerland) R Stadler | 6 | 3 | 2
(Argentina) M Ingaramo (Mexico) F Maciel | 3 | 6 | 6
4 | (Italy) C Panatta (Sweden) H Sundström | 6 | 4
(United States) E Adams (United States) M Flur | 7 | 6
(New Zealand) B Derlin (West Germany) D Keretić | 4 | 7 | 4
7 | (Peru) P Arraya (Spain) S Casal | 6 | 5 | 6

Quarterfinals
1 | (Czechoslovakia) P Složil (Czechoslovakia) T Šmíd | 6 | 7
(Argentina) M Ingaramo (Mexico) F Maciel | 1 | 6
(United States) E Adams (United States) M Flur | 6 | 6
7 | (Peru) P Arraya (Spain) S Casal | 3 | 3

Semifinals
1 | (Czechoslovakia) P Složil (Czechoslovakia) T Šmíd | 6 | 6
(United States) E Adams (United States) M Flur | 2 | 4

=== Bottom half ===
First round
8 | (Argentina) M Jaite (Paraguay) V Pecci | 6 | 6
(Spain) J Avendaño (Spain) J Bardou | 3 | 4
(United States) B Nealon (Sweden) J Windahl | 6 | 6
(Argentina) F Yunis (Argentina) JC Yunis | 2 | 2
(Spain) J Aguilera (Spain) A Tous | 6 | 6
(Spain) J Sánchez (Spain) Martín Valenti | 2 | 2
(Czechoslovakia) J Navrátil (Socialist Federal Republic of Yugoslavia) S Živojinović | 2 | 4
3 | (Sweden) J Nyström (Sweden) M Wilander | 6 | 6
5 | (Sweden) S Simonsson (Sweden) M Tideman | 6 | 6
(Czechoslovakia) J Čihák (West Germany) P Vojtíšek | 2 | 4
(Argentina) C Castellan (Uruguay) D Pérez | 6 | 7 | 6
(Spain) D de Miguel (Brazil) A Hocevar | 7 | 6 | 3
(Spain) L Fargas (Spain) G Urpí | 6 | 6
(Spain) Á Giménez (Spain) J Soler | 2 | 2
(West Germany) H Schwaier (France) T Tulasne | 1 | 6 | 4
2 | (Czechoslovakia) L Pimek (United States) B Willenborg | 6 | 4 | 6

Second round
8 | (Argentina) M Jaite (Paraguay) V Pecci | 6 | 6
(United States) B Nealon (Sweden) J Windahl | 3 | 4
(Spain) J Aguilera (Spain) A Tous | 6 | 6 | 2
3 | (Sweden) J Nyström (Sweden) M Wilander | 7 | 4 | 6
5 | (Sweden) S Simonsson (Sweden) M Tideman | 6 | 6
(Argentina) C Castellan (Uruguay) D Pérez | 3 | 0
(Spain) L Fargas (Spain) G Urpí | 2 | 6 | 6
2 | (Czechoslovakia) L Pimek (United States) B Willenborg | 6 | 3 | 3

Quarterfinals
8 | (Argentina) M Jaite (Paraguay) V Pecci | 6 | 4 | 6
3 | (Sweden) J Nyström (Sweden) M Wilander | 2 | 6 | 2
5 | (Sweden) S Simonsson (Sweden) M Tideman | 4 | 6 | 4
(Spain) L Fargas (Spain) G Urpí | 6 | 2 | 6

Semifinals
8 | (Argentina) M Jaite (Paraguay) V Pecci | 3 | 6 | 6
(Spain) L Fargas (Spain) G Urpí | 6 | 3 | 2
