= 1983 Torneo Godó – Singles =

Singles
- 1983 Torneo Godó

Final
- Champion: (Sweden) Mats Wilander
- Runner-up: (Argentina) Guillermo Vilas
- Score: 6–0, 6–3, 6–1

Details
- Draw: 64
- Seeds: 16

Events
Singles	Doubles
← 1982 ·	Barcelona Open	· 1984 →

Mats Wilander successfully defended his title, by defeating Guillermo Vilas 6–0, 6–3, 6–1 in the final. Vilas completed his 4th consecutive year as runner-up.

== Seeds ==
1. (Sweden) Mats Wilander (champion)
2. (Spain) José Higueras (third round)
3. (Argentina) Guillermo Vilas (final)
4. (Ecuador) Andrés Gómez (semifinals)
5. (Sweden) Henrik Sundström (first round)
6. (Czechoslovakia) Tomáš Šmíd (semifinals)
7. (Sweden) Anders Järryd (quarterfinals)
8. (Switzerland) Heinz Günthardt (first round)
9. (Italy) Corrado Barazzutti (second round)
10. (Argentina) Roberto Argüello (first round)
11. (Peru) Pablo Arraya (third round)
12. (Spain) Fernando Luna (second round)
13. (Sweden) Stefan Simonsson (third round)
14. (Uruguay) Diego Pérez (first round)
15. (Czechoslovakia) Libor Pimek (quarterfinals)
16. (Spain) Manuel Orantes (second round)

Click on the seed number of a player to go to their draw section.

== Draw ==
=== Key ===
- Q = Qualifier
- WC = Wild card
- LL = Lucky loser
- Alt = Alternate
- SE = Special exempt
- PR = Protected ranking
- ITF = ITF entry
- JE = Junior exempt
- w/o = Walkover
- r = Retired
- d = Defaulted
- SR = Special ranking

=== Finals ===
Quarterfinals
1	(Sweden) Mats Wilander	6	6	6
(Sweden) Jan Gunnarsson	7	0	3
4	(Ecuador) Andrés Gómez	2	6	6
7	(Sweden) Anders Järryd	6	2	4
15	(Czechoslovakia) Libor Pimek	5	6	4
3	(Argentina) Guillermo Vilas	7	3	6
6	(Czechoslovakia) Tomáš Šmíd	6	7
(Spain) Juan Aguilera	3	6

Semifinals
1	(Sweden) Mats Wilander	6	7
4	(Ecuador) Andrés Gómez	3	6
3	(Argentina) Guillermo Vilas	7	6
6	(Czechoslovakia) Tomáš Šmíd	6	1

Final
1	(Sweden) Mats Wilander	6	6	6
3	(Argentina) Guillermo Vilas	0	3	1

=== Top half ===
==== Section 1 ====
First round
1	(Sweden) M Wilander	7	7
(Spain) L Fargas	6	5
Q	(Norway) M Rønneberg	4	4
(United States) J Gurfein	6	6
Q	(Spain) J Lopez-Maeso	5	5
(Spain) J Avendaño	7	7
(Czech Republic) J Navrátil	6	1	5
12	(Spain) F Luna	4	6	7
10	(Argentina) R Argüello	6	4	3
(Colombia) J Velasco Sr.	4	6	6
(Czechoslovakia) P Slozil	2	3
Q	(Spain) R Vizcaíno	6	6
(United States) E Iskersky	6	6
Q	(Spain) J Bardou	2	2
(Sweden) J Gunnarsson	1	6	7
5	(Sweden) H Sundström	6	4	5

Second round
1	(Sweden) M Wilander	6	6
(United States) J Gurfein	2	4
(Spain) J Avendaño	7	6
12	(Spain) F Luna	5	3
(Colombia) J Velasco Sr.	2	6	5
Q	(Spain) R Vizcaíno	6	1	7
(United States) E Iskersky	3	4
(Sweden) J Gunnarsson	6	6

Third round
1	(Sweden) M Wilander	6	6
(Spain) J Avendaño	3	2
Q	(Spain) R Vizcaíno	6	6	1^{r}
(Sweden) J Gunnarsson	7	3	2

Quarterfinals
1	(Sweden) M Wilander	6	6	6
(Sweden) J Gunnarsson	7	0	3

==== Section 2 ====
First round
4	(Ecuador) A Gómez	7	6
Q	(United States) B Willenborg	6	3
(South Africa) E Edwards	3	6	4
(United States) H Solomon	6	3	6
Q	(Spain) E Osta	2	4
(Spain) G Urpí	6	6
(Sweden) J Nyström	6	6
14	(Uruguay) D Pérez	2	3
16	(Spain) M Orantes	6	6
Q	(Argentina) A Gattiker	1	1
(Czechoslovakia) M Mečíř	7	6
(Argentina) C Castellan	6	3
(France) G Goven	1	1
(France) T Tulasne	6	6
(West Germany) A Maurer	6	6
7	(Sweden) A Järryd	7	7

Second round
4	(Ecuador) A Gómez	6	1	6
(United States) H Solomon	3	6	4
(Spain) G Urpí	6	2	0
(Sweden) J Nyström	1	6	6
16	(Spain) M Orantes	6	3	3
(Czechoslovakia) M Mečíř	1	6	6
(France) T Tulasne	3	1
7	(Sweden) A Järryd	6	6

Third round
4	(Ecuador) A Gómez	6	6
(Sweden) J Nyström	4	4
(Czechoslovakia) M Mečíř	3	2
7	(Sweden) A Järryd	6	6

Quarterfinals
4	(Ecuador) A Gómez	2	6	6
7	(Sweden) A Järryd	6	2	4

=== Bottom half ===
==== Section 3 ====
First round
8	(Switzerland) H Gunthardt	2	6	6
(Germany) R Gehring	6	4	8
(Switzerland) R Stadler	3	7	6
(France) D Bedel	6	5	4
(United States) S Lipton	7	2	2
(Spain) A Tous	5	6	6
(France) P Kuchna	2	3
15	(Czechoslovakia) L Pimek	6	6
11	(Peru) P Arraya	6	6	6
(Sweden) M Tideman	3	7	2
(Netherlands) M Schapers	0	4
(West Germany) H Schwaier	6	6
(Chile) R Acuña	6	1	5
(South Africa) M Myburg	2	6	7
(Spain) J Soler	2	4
3	(Argentina) G Vilas	6	6

Second round
(Germany) R Gehring	7	6
(Switzerland) R Stadler	5	1
(Spain) A Tous	2	3
15	(Czechoslovakia) L Pimek	6	6
11	(Peru) P Arraya	6	6
(West Germany) H Schwaier	3	4
(South Africa) M Myburg	2	1
3	(Argentina) G Vilas	6	6

Third round
(Germany) R Gehring	2	2
15	(Czechoslovakia) L Pimek	6	6
11	(Peru) P Arraya	2	4
3	(Argentina) G Vilas	6	6

Quarterfinals
15	(Czechoslovakia) L Pimek	5	6	4
3	(Argentina) G Vilas	7	3	6

==== Section 4 ====
First round
6	(Czechoslovakia) T Smid	6	6
(South Africa) R Venter	2	1
LL	(Chile) A Pierola	4	2
(Spain) F Soler	6	6
Q	(United States) B Csipkay	4	0
(Argentina) M Jaite	6	6
(Sweden) H Simonsson	2	5
13	(Sweden) S Simonsson	6	7
9	(Italy) C Barazzutti	6	6
(Italy) C Panatta	1	3
(Spain) A Gimenez	4	1
(Spain) J Aguilera	6	6
(Spain) J García Requena	7	3	3
(Germany) D Keretić	5	6	6
(Spain) S Casal	3	1
2	(Spain) J Higueras	6	6

Second round
6	(Czechoslovakia) T Smid	6	7
(Spain) F Soler	2	5
(Argentina) M Jaite	2	5
13	(Sweden) S Simonsson	6	7
9	(Italy) C Barazzutti	6	1
(Spain) J Aguilera	7	6
(Germany) D Keretić	7	4	4
2	(Spain) J Higueras	6	6	6

Third round
6	(Czechoslovakia) T Smid	6	6
13	(Sweden) S Simonsson	4	1
(Spain) J Aguilera	1	6	6
2	(Spain) J Higueras	6	3	4

Quarterfinals
6	(Czechoslovakia) T Smid	6	7
(Spain) J Aguilera	3	6
