= 1983 Torneo Godó =

- Date: 3–9 October
- Edition: 31st
- Category: Grand Prix
- Draw: 64S / 32D
- Prize money: $200,000
- Surface: Clay / outdoor
- Location: Barcelona, Catalonia, Spain
- Venue: Real Club de Tenis Barcelona

Champions

Singles
- (Sweden) Mats Wilander

Doubles
- (Sweden) Anders Jarryd / (Sweden) Hans Simonsson
← 1982 ·	Torneo Godó	· 1984 →

The 1983 Torneo Godó or Trofeo Conde de Godó was a men's tennis tournament that took place on outdoor clay courts at the Real Club de Tenis Barcelona in Barcelona, Catalonia in Spain. It was the 31st edition of the tournament and was part of the 1983 Grand Prix circuit. It was held from 3 October until 9 October 1983. First-seeded Mats Wilander won his second consecutive singles title at the event.

This event also carried the joint denominations of the Campeonatos Internacionales de España or Spanish International Championships that was hosted at this venue and location, and was 16th edition to be held in Barcelona, and the 6th edition of the Open Marlborough (for sponsorship reasons).

== Finals ==
=== Singles ===
(Sweden) Mats Wilander defeated (Argentina) Guillermo Vilas 6–0, 6–3, 6–1

- It was Wilander's 7th singles title of the year and 11th of his career.

=== Doubles ===
(Sweden) Anders Jarryd / (Sweden) Hans Simonsson defeated (United States) Jim Gurfein / (United States) Erick Iskersky 7–5, 6–3
