= 1982 Torneo Godó – Doubles =

Doubles
- 1982 Torneo Godó

Final
- Champions: (Sweden) Anders Järryd (Sweden) Hans Simonsson
- Runners-up: (Brazil) Carlos Kirmayr (Brazil) Cássio Motta
- Score: 6–3, 6–2

Details
- Draw: 32
- Seeds: 8

Events
Singles	Doubles
- Barcelona Open

Anders Järryd and Hans Simonsson successfully defended their title, by defeating Carlos Kirmayr and Cássio Motta 6–3, 6–2 in the final.

== Seeds ==
1. (Chile) Hans Gildemeister / (Ecuador) Andrés Gómez (second round)
2. (Czech Republic) Pavel Složil / (Czech Republic) Tomáš Šmíd (semifinals)
3. (Sweden) Anders Järryd / (Sweden) Hans Simonsson (champions)
4. (Brazil) Carlos Kirmayr / (Brazil) Cássio Motta (final)
5. (withdrew)
6. (Uruguay) José Luis Damiani / (Uruguay) Diego Pérez (second round)
7. (withdrew)
8. (United States) Egan Adams / (United States) Jim Gurfein (first round)

== Draw ==
Key

- Q = Qualifier
- WC = Wild card
- LL = Lucky loser
- Alt = Alternate
- ITF = ITF entry
- PR = Protected ranking
- SR = Special ranking
- SE = Special exempt
- JE = Junior exempt
- JR = Junior Accelerator Programme entrant
- CO = College Accelerator Programme entrant
- NG = Next Gen Accelerator Program entrant
- w/o = Walkover
- r = Retired
- d = Defaulted

=== Finals ===
Semifinals
(Italy) Claudio Panatta (Italy) Adriano Panatta	6	3
3	(Sweden) Anders Järryd (Sweden) Hans Simonsson	7	6
4	(Brazil) Carlos Kirmayr (Brazil) Cássio Motta	6	6
2	(Czech Republic) Pavel Složil (Czech Republic) Tomáš Šmíd	3	1

Final
3	(Sweden) Anders Järryd (Sweden) Hans Simonsson	6	6
4	(Brazil) Carlos Kirmayr (Brazil) Cássio Motta	3	2

=== Top half ===
First round
1	(Chile) H Gildemeister (Ecuador) A Gómez	7	2	10
(Bolivia) M Martinez (Chile) P Rebolledo	6	6	8
(Spain) S Casal (Spain) A Gimenez	4	6	6
(Peru) P Arraya (Sweden) S Simonsson	6	2	4
(Spain) E Osta (Spain) R Vizcaíno	6	6
(Spain) A Munoz (Spain) M Valenti	2	1
(Italy) C Panatta (Italy) A Panatta	6	6
LL	(Spain) G Escofet (Spain) M Margets	4	0
3	(Sweden) A Järryd (Sweden) H Simonsson	6	6
(Spain) J Lopez-Maeso (Spain) M Mir	4	1
(New Zealand) B Derlin (New Zealand) J Simpson	6	6
(Austria) B Pils (South Africa) B Pirow	2	4
(Spain) J Higueras (Spain) G Urpí	6	6	6
(Croatia) Z Franulović (Brazil) M Hocevar	7	1	4
(Spain) J Duarte de Ochoa (Spain) L Fargas	1	6	6
LL	(Spain) D de Miguel (Spain) F Ferrer	6	4	4

Second round
1	(Chile) H Gildemeister (Ecuador) A Gómez	1	4
(Spain) S Casal (Spain) A Gimenez	6	6
(Spain) E Osta (Spain) R Vizcaíno	6	1	2
(Italy) C Panatta (Italy) A Panatta	4	6	6
3	(Sweden) A Järryd (Sweden) H Simonsson	6	6
(New Zealand) B Derlin (New Zealand) J Simpson	3	4
(Spain) J Higueras (Spain) G Urpí	6	3	6
(Spain) J Duarte de Ochoa (Spain) L Fargas	3	6	1

Quarterfinals
(Spain) S Casal (Spain) A Gimenez	6	4
(Italy) C Panatta (Italy) A Panatta	7	6
3	(Sweden) A Järryd (Sweden) H Simonsson	6	6
(Spain) J Higueras (Spain) G Urpí	4	4

Semifinals
(Italy) C Panatta (Italy) A Panatta	6	3
3	(Sweden) A Järryd (Sweden) H Simonsson	7	6

=== Bottom half ===
First round
8	(United States) E Adams (United States) J Gurfein	2	4
(France) D Bedel (United States) M Dickson	6	6
(Chile) P Rodríguez (Spain) E Sánchez	6	6
(Spain) J Bardou (Spain) A Capella	2	2
(Argentina) M Jaite (Spain) A Tous	6	5	6
(Austria) G Mild (Austria) I Wimmer	1	7	3
(Italy) G Ocleppo (Paraguay) V Pecci	2	4
4	(Brazil) C Kirmayr (Brazil) C Motta	6	6
6	(Uruguay) J-L Damiani (Uruguay) D Pérez	7	6
(Spain) F Soler (Spain) J Soler	6	0
(Sweden) J Nyström (Sweden) M Wilander	6	4	6
(Australia) C Limberger (South Africa) M Myburg	3	6	3
(Spain) J Avendaño (Chile) A Pierola	4	6	6
(Sweden) P Hjertquist (India) R Krishnan	6	2	4
(Hungary) Z Kuhárszky (Croatia) M Ostoja	0	7	2
2	(Czech Republic) P Složil (Czech Republic) T Šmid	6	6	6

Second round
(France) D Bedel (United States) M Dickson	3	3
(Chile) P Rodríguez (Spain) E Sánchez	6	6
(Argentina) M Jaite (Spain) A Tous	2	4
4	(Brazil) C Kirmayr (Brazil) C Motta	6	6
6	(Uruguay) J-L Damiani (Uruguay) D Pérez	4	3
(Sweden) J Nyström (Sweden) M Wilander	6	6
(Spain) J Avendaño (Chile) A Pierola	2	1
2	(Czech Republic) P Složil (Czech Republic) T Šmid	6	6

Quarterfinals
(Chile) P Rodríguez (Spain) E Sánchez	4	4
4	(Brazil) C Kirmayr (Brazil) C Motta	6	6
(Sweden) J Nyström (Sweden) M Wilander	2	4
2	(Czech Republic) P Složil (Czech Republic) T Šmid	6	6

Semifinals
4	(Brazil) C Kirmayr (Brazil) C Motta	6	6
2	(Czech Republic) P Složil (Czech Republic) T Šmid	3	1
