= 1984 Tel Aviv Open – Singles =

Singles
- 1984 Tel Aviv Open

Final
- Champion: (United States) Aaron Krickstein
- Runner-up: (Israel) Shahar Perkiss
- Score: 6–4, 6–1

Events
Singles	Doubles
- Tel Aviv Open

Aaron Krickstein was the defending champion.

Krickstein successfully defended his title, beating Shahar Perkiss in the final, 6–4, 6–1.

== Seeds ==
1. (United States) Aaron Krickstein (champion)
2. (Italy) Gianni Ocleppo (first round)
3. (Israel) Shlomo Glickstein (quarterfinals)
4. (United Kingdom) Colin Dowdeswell (second round)
5. (Israel) Shahar Perkiss (final)
6. (Switzerland) Jakob Hlasek (quarterfinals)
7. (United States) Roscoe Tanner (first round)
8. (United States) Bob Green (semifinals)

== Draw ==
Key

- Q = Qualifier
- WC = Wild card
- LL = Lucky loser
- Alt = Alternate
- ITF = ITF entry
- PR = Protected ranking
- SR = Special ranking
- SE = Special exempt
- JE = Junior exempt
- JR = Junior Accelerator Programme entrant
- CO = College Accelerator Programme entrant
- NG = Next Gen Accelerator Program entrant
- w/o = Walkover
- r = Retired
- d = Defaulted

=== Finals ===
Semifinals
1	(United States) Aaron Krickstein	7	6
8	(United States) Bob Green	6	2
5	(Israel) Shahar Perkiss	6	4
WC	(Israel) Amos Mansdorf	2	1^{r}

Final
1	(United States) Aaron Krickstein	6	6
5	(Israel) Shahar Perkiss	4	1

=== Top half ===
First round
1	(United States) A Krickstein	6	6
(Israel) Oded Yaacov	2	0
Q	(Israel) Shai Puni	5	1
(United States) J Turpin	7	6
(United States) M Wooldridge	3	6	6
(Italy) F Rocchi	6	3	3
(United States) S Brawley	5	5
6	(Switzerland) J Hlasek	7	7
3	(Israel) S Glickstein	6	6	6
(Chile) Á Fillol	7	3	1
LL	(Israel) Gadi Irshai	0	1
(United States) H Sands	6	6
(West Germany) J Becka	6	7
(Sweden) P Carlsson	4	6
(Australia) P Doohan	7	6	6
8	(United States) B Green	5	7	7

Second round
1	(United States) A Krickstein	6	6
(United States) J Turpin	2	3
(United States) M Wooldridge	2	2
6	(Switzerland) J Hlasek	6	6
3	(Israel) S Glickstein	6	6
(United States) H Sands	2	2
(West Germany) J Becka	4	6	1
8	(United States) B Green	6	4	6

Quarterfinals
1	(United States) A Krickstein	3	7	6
6	(Switzerland) J Hlasek	6	6	2
3	(Israel) S Glickstein	4	1
8	(United States) B Green	6	6

Semifinals
1	(United States) A Krickstein	7	6
8	(United States) B Green	6	2

=== Bottom half ===
First round
5	(Israel) S Perkiss	6	6
(United States) G Layendecker	4	4
Q	(Israel) T Zimmerman	3	4
WC	(Israel) G Bloom	6	6
(South Africa) B Levine	6	6
Q	(Sweden) P Hjertquist	2	4
(Spain) Roberto Vizcaíno	3	2
4	(United Kingdom) C Dowdeswell	6	6
7	(United States) R Tanner	4	6
WC	(Israel) A Mansdorf	6	7
WC	(Israel) Eylon Sinai	4	7	3
(Argentina) G Rivas	6	6	6
Q	(Finland) L Palin	2	7	6
(United States) R Meyer	6	6	4
(United States) M Flur	6	1	6
2	(Italy) G Ocleppo	3	6	3

Second round
5	(Israel) S Perkiss	6	6
WC	(Israel) G Bloom	4	2
(South Africa) B Levine	3	6	6
4	(United Kingdom) C Dowdeswell	6	3	3
WC	(Israel) A Mansdorf	1	6	6
(Argentina) G Rivas	6	4	2
Q	(Finland) L Palin	6	2	6
(United States) M Flur	3	6	7

Quarterfinals
5	(Israel) S Perkiss	6	6
(South Africa) B Levine	1	2
WC	(Israel) A Mansdorf	6	4	6
(United States) M Flur	4	6	2

Semifinals
5	(Israel) S Perkiss	6	4
WC	(Israel) A Mansdorf	2	1^{r}
