= 1983 Geneva Open – Doubles =

Doubles
- 1983 Geneva Open

Final
- Champions: (Czechoslovakia) Stanislav Birner (United States) Blaine Willenborg
- Runners-up: (Sweden) Joakim Nyström (Sweden) Mats Wilander
- Score: 6–1, 2–6, 6–3

Events
Singles	Doubles
← 1982 ·	Geneva Open	· 1984 →

Pavel Složil and Tomáš Šmíd were the defending champions, but did not participate this year.

Stanislav Birner and Blaine Willenborg won the title, defeating Joakim Nyström and Mats Wilander 6–1, 2–6, 6–3 in the final.

== Seeds ==
1. (Sweden) Anders Järryd / (Sweden) Hans Simonsson (first round)
2. (Sweden) Joakim Nyström / (Sweden) Mats Wilander (final)
3. (South Africa) Tian Viljoen / (South Africa) Danie Visser (semifinals)
4. (Czechoslovakia) Stanislav Birner / (United States) Blaine Willenborg (champions)

== Draw ==
=== Key ===
- Q = Qualifier
- WC = Wild card
- LL = Lucky loser
- Alt = Alternate
- SE = Special exempt
- PR = Protected ranking
- ITF = ITF entry
- JE = Junior exempt
- w/o = Walkover
- r = Retired
- d = Defaulted
- SR = Special ranking

=== Draw ===
First round
1	(Sweden) A Järryd (Sweden) H Simonsson	4	1
(Spain) S Casal (Italy) C Panatta	6	6
(Denmark) P Bastiansen (Denmark) M Mortensen	6	6
(South Africa) E Edwards (South Africa) R Moore	2	2
4	(Czechoslovakia) S Birner (United States) B Willenborg	6	7
(Switzerland) J Hlasek (South Africa) S van der Merwe	4	6
(Argentina) A Gattiker (Argentina) C Gattiker	6	6
(Czechoslovakia) J Granát (Switzerland) R Stadler	4	4
(Switzerland) M Günthardt (Hungary) Z Kuharszky	6	6
(Sweden) J Carlsson (Sweden) J Svensson	2	1
3	(South Africa) T Viljoen (South Africa) D Visser	6	6
(United States) J Gurfein (Socialist Federal Republic of Yugoslavia) M Ostoja	3	4
(France) D Bedel (France) G Forget	6	6
(Bolivia) R Benavides (Spain) J López-Maeso	2	4
(Spain) F Soler (Spain) G Urpí	2	3
2	(Sweden) J Nyström (Sweden) M Wilander	6	6

Quarterfinals
(Spain) S Casal (Italy) C Panatta	1	6	1
(Denmark) P Bastiansen (Denmark) M Mortensen	6	4	6
4	(Czechoslovakia) S Birner (United States) B Willenborg	7	6
(Argentina) A Gattiker (Argentina) C Gattiker	5	4
(Switzerland) M Günthardt (Hungary) Z Kuharszky	2	7	5
3	(South Africa) T Viljoen (South Africa) D Visser	6	6	7
(France) D Bedel (France) G Forget	4	6	2
2	(Sweden) J Nyström (Sweden) M Wilander	6	2	6

Semifinals
(Denmark) P Bastiansen (Denmark) M Mortensen	4	6
4	(Czechoslovakia) S Birner (United States) B Willenborg	6	7
3	(South Africa) T Viljoen (South Africa) D Visser	4	3
2	(Sweden) J Nyström (Sweden) M Wilander	6	6

Final
4	(Czechoslovakia) S Birner (United States) B Willenborg	6	2	6
2	(Sweden) J Nyström (Sweden) M Wilander	1	6	3
