= 1984 Tel Aviv Open – Doubles =

Doubles
- 1984 Tel Aviv Open

Final
- Champions: (Australia) Peter Doohan (South Africa) Brian Levine
- Runners-up: (United Kingdom) Colin Dowdeswell (Switzerland) Jakob Hlasek
- Score: 6–3, 6–4

Events
Singles	Doubles
- Tel Aviv Open

Colin Dowdeswell and Zoltán Kuhárszky were the defending champions, but Kuhárszky did not participate this year. Dowdeswell partnered Jakob Hlasek, losing in the final.

Peter Doohan and Brian Levine won the title, defeating Colin Dowdeswell and Jakob Hlasek 6–3, 6–4 in the final.

== Seeds ==
1. (United Kingdom) Colin Dowdeswell / (Switzerland) Jakob Hlasek (final)
2. (United States) Richard Meyer / (United States) Jeff Turpin (quarterfinals)
3. (Australia) Peter Doohan / (South Africa) Brian Levine (champions)
4. (United States) Sean Brawley / (United States) Howard Sands (first round)

== Draw ==
Key

- Q = Qualifier
- WC = Wild card
- LL = Lucky loser
- Alt = Alternate
- ITF = ITF entry
- PR = Protected ranking
- SR = Special ranking
- SE = Special exempt
- JE = Junior exempt
- JR = Junior Accelerator Programme entrant
- CO = College Accelerator Programme entrant
- NG = Next Gen Accelerator Program entrant
- w/o = Walkover
- r = Retired
- d = Defaulted

=== Draw ===
First round
1	(United Kingdom) C Dowdeswell (Switzerland) J Hlasek	6	6
(United States) M Flur (United States) B Green	2	4
(United States) G Layendecker (United States) M Wooldridge	6	6
(Israel) Doron Hartal (Israel) Boaz Nikritin	3	2
4	(United States) S Brawley (United States) H Sands	4	7	4
(West Germany) J Becka (Chile) Á Fillol	6	6	6
(Sweden) P Hjertquist (Finland) L Palin	6	6
(Israel) Oded Jacob (Israel) A Naor	0	2
(United States) M Bauer (Israel) T Zimmerman	0	4
(Israel) A Mansdorf (Israel) S Perkiss	6	6
(Israel) G Bloom (Israel) Eylon Sinai	0	2
3	(Australia) P Doohan (South Africa) B Levine	6	6
(Italy) F Rocchi (Spain) R Vizcaino	6	6
(Sweden) P Carlsson (Argentina) G Rivas	2	3
(Israel) Shai Puni (Israel) M Wertheimer	5	2
2	(United States) R Meyer (United States) J Turpin	7	6

Quarterfinals
1	(United Kingdom) C Dowdeswell (Switzerland) J Hlasek	6	6	6
(United States) G Layendecker (United States) M Wooldridge	4	7	3
(West Germany) J Becka (Chile) Á Fillol	6	7
(Sweden) P Hjertquist (Finland) L Palin	4	6
(Israel) A Mansdorf (Israel) S Perkiss	2	3
3	(Australia) P Doohan (South Africa) B Levine	6	6
(Italy) F Rocchi (Spain) R Vizcaino	7	6
2	(United States) R Meyer (United States) J Turpin	5	4

Semifinals
1	(United Kingdom) C Dowdeswell (Switzerland) J Hlasek	6	7
(West Germany) J Becka (Chile) Á Fillol	1	6
3	(Australia) P Doohan (South Africa) B Levine	5
(Italy) F Rocchi (Spain) R Vizcaino	4^{r}

Final
1	(United Kingdom) C Dowdeswell (Switzerland) J Hlasek	3	4
3	(Australia) P Doohan (South Africa) B Levine	6	6
