= 1984 Sovran Bank Classic – Singles =

Singles
- 1984 Sovran Bank Classic

Final
- Champion: (Ecuador) Andrés Gómez
- Runner-up: (United States) Aaron Krickstein
- Score: 6–2, 6–2

Details
- Draw: 56
- Seeds: 16

Events
Singles	Doubles
- Washington Open

José Luis Clerc was the defending champion, but lost in the second round to Thierry Tulasne.

Andrés Gómez won the title by defeating Aaron Krickstein 6–2, 6–2 in the final.

== Seeds ==
1. (United States) Jimmy Arias (second round)
2. (Ecuador) Andrés Gómez (champion)
3. (Sweden) Henrik Sundström (third round)
4. (Spain) Juan Aguilera (second round)
5. (Argentina) Guillermo Vilas (semifinals)
6. (Argentina) José Luis Clerc (second round)
7. (United States) Aaron Krickstein (final)
8. (United States) Mel Purcell (quarterfinals)
9. (Italy) Francesco Cancellotti (first round)
10. (Czechoslovakia) Libor Pimek (first round)
11. (Uruguay) Diego Pérez (quarterfinals)
12. (United States) Mark Dickson (first round)
13. (Peru) Pablo Arraya (quarterfinals)
14. (Spain) Fernando Luna (third round)
15. (Italy) Claudio Panatta (first round)
16. (United States) Brian Gottfried (third round)

Click on the seed number of a player to go to their draw section.

== Draw ==
Key

- Q = Qualifier
- WC = Wild card
- LL = Lucky loser
- Alt = Alternate
- ITF = ITF entry
- PR = Protected ranking
- SR = Special ranking
- SE = Special exempt
- JE = Junior exempt
- JR = Junior Accelerator Programme entrant
- CO = College Accelerator Programme entrant
- NG = Next Gen Accelerator Program entrant
- w/o = Walkover
- r = Retired
- d = Defaulted

=== Finals ===
Quarterfinals
(United States) Dan Goldie	7	2	2
(France) Thierry Tulasne	5	6	6
11	(Uruguay) Diego Pérez	6	1
7	(United States) Aaron Krickstein	7	6
5	(Argentina) Guillermo Vilas	6	7
13	(Peru) Pablo Arraya	1	6
8	(United States) Mel Purcell	6	4
2	(Ecuador) Andrés Gómez	7	6

Semifinals
(France) Thierry Tulasne	3	6	3
7	(United States) Aaron Krickstein	6	3	6
5	(Argentina) Guillermo Vilas	1	5
2	(Ecuador) Andrés Gómez	6	7

Final
7	(United States) Aaron Krickstein	2	2
2	(Ecuador) Andrés Gómez	6	6

=== Top half ===
==== Section 1 ====
First round
(United States) C Hooper	2	2
(United States) D Goldie	6	6
(Spain) G Urpí	6	6
(New Zealand) D Mustard	4	3
(United States) D Tarr	3	6
16	(United States) B Gottfried	6	7
14	(Spain) F Luna	6	3	6
(United States) R Seguso	4	6	1
(United States) L Duncan	2	0
(France) T Allan	6	6
(France) T Tulasne	6	6
(United States) B Willenborg	2	1

Second round
1	(United States) J Arias	3	4
(United States) D Goldie	6	6
(Spain) G Urpí	2	1
16	(United States) B Gottfried	6	6
14	(Spain) F Luna	6	6
(France) T Allan	2	3
(France) T Tulasne	7	6
6	(Argentina) J Luis Clerc	6	3

Third round
(United States) D Goldie	7	6
16	(United States) B Gottfried	5	4
14	(Spain) F Luna	5	4
(France) T Tulasne	7	6

Quarterfinals
(United States) D Goldie	7	2	2
(France) T Tulasne	5	6	6

==== Section 2 ====
First round
(Switzerland) Z Kuhárszky	7	6
(United States) R Harmon	5	3
(New Zealand) C Lewis	6	5	7
(Hungary) B Taróczy	3	7	5
Q	(United States) J Lapidus	5	5
11	(Uruguay) D Pérez	7	7
10	(Czechoslovakia) L Pimek	1	2
Q	(United States) E Adams	6	6
(United States) B Manson	1	7	6
(Paraguay) F González	6	5	7
(United States) E Dibbs	6	5	2
(Chile) H Gildemeister	3	7	6

Second round
4	(Spain) J Aguilera	4	4
(Switzerland) Z Kuhárszky	6	6
(New Zealand) C Lewis	1	3
11	(Uruguay) D Pérez	6	6
Q	(United States) E Adams	6	6
(Paraguay) F González	2	3
(Chile) H Gildemeister	0	3
7	(United States) A Krickstein	6	6

Third round
(Switzerland) Z Kuhárszky	5	1
11	(Uruguay) D Pérez	7	6
Q	(United States) E Adams	3	6
7	(United States) A Krickstein	6	7

Quarterfinals
11	(Uruguay) D Pérez	6	1
7	(United States) A Krickstein	7	6

=== Bottom half ===
==== Section 3 ====
First round
(United States) J Brown	6	6
(United States) V Winitsky	3	4
(Bolivia) M Martinez	1^{r}
(Chile) P Rebolledo	5
(United States) T Moor	6	6	6
15	(Italy) C Panatta	7	2	4
13	(Peru) P Arraya	6	6
Q	(Spain) J Arrese	0	1
(Brazil) C Motta	6	6
(Chile) R Acuña	4	0
Q	(Spain) F Soler	6	6
(Sweden) M Pernfors	0	2

Second round
5	(Argentina) G Vilas	4	6	6
(United States) J Brown	6	0	4
(Chile) P Rebolledo	6	6
(United States) T Moor	4	2
13	(Peru) P Arraya	6	6
(Brazil) C Motta	3	4
Q	(Spain) F Soler	5	2
3	(Sweden) H Sundström	7	6

Third round
5	(Argentina) G Vilas	6	6
(Chile) P Rebolledo	2	2
13	(Peru) P Arraya	6	4	6
3	(Sweden) H Sundström	2	6	3

Quarterfinals
5	(Argentina) G Vilas	6	7
13	(Peru) P Arraya	1	6

==== Section 4 ====
First round
Q	(United States) B Brescia	2	2
(Germany) M Westphal	6	6
(Czechoslovakia) P Složil	7	6
(United States) T Nelson	6	1
(Croatia) M Ostoja	2	6	6
12	(United States) M Dickson	6	3	4
9	(Italy) F Cancellotti	2	6
(Brazil) J Soares	6	7
Q	(Argentina) A Ganzábal	6	6
(United States) M Flur	4	0
Q	(United States) J Gurfein	4	4
(Argentina) R Argüello	6	6

Second round
8	(United States) M Purcell	6	6
(Germany) M Westphal	1	4
(Czechoslovakia) P Složil	7	6
(Croatia) M Ostoja	6	1
(Brazil) J Soares	6	7
Q	(Argentina) A Ganzábal	1	6
(Argentina) R Argüello	1	1
2	(Ecuador) A Gómez	6	6

Third round
8	(United States) M Purcell	6	6
(Czechoslovakia) P Složil	3	2
(Brazil) J Soares	6	1
2	(Ecuador) A Gómez	7	6

Quarterfinals
8	(United States) M Purcell	6	4
2	(Ecuador) A Gómez	7	6
