= 1982 Torneo Godó – Singles =

Singles
- 1982 Torneo Godó

Final
- Champion: (Sweden) Mats Wilander
- Runner-up: (Argentina) Guillermo Vilas
- Score: 6–3, 6–4, 6–3

Details
- Draw: 64
- Seeds: 16

Events
Singles	Doubles
← 1981 ·	Barcelona Open	· 1983 →

Ivan Lendl was the defending champion, but lost in the quarterfinals to Mats Wilander.

Wilander won the title by defeating Guillermo Vilas 6–3, 6–4, 6–3 in the final.

== Seeds ==
1. (United States) Ivan Lendl (quarterfinals)
2. (Argentina) Guillermo Vilas (final)
3. (Spain) José Higueras (first round)
4. (Argentina) José Luis Clerc (semifinals)
5. (Sweden) Mats Wilander (champion)
6. (Ecuador) Andrés Gómez (second round)
7. (Hungary) Balázs Taróczy (second round)
8. (Czechoslovakia) Tomáš Šmíd (first round)
9. (United States) Eddie Dibbs (second round)
10. (Chile) Hans Gildemeister (quarterfinals)
11. (New Zealand) Chris Lewis (second round)
12. (United States) Mark Dickson (first round)
13. (Peru) Pablo Arraya (third round)
14. (Czechoslovakia) Pavel Složil (third round)
15. (Chile) Pedro Rebolledo (first round)
16. (Paraguay) Víctor Pecci (third round)

Click on the seed number of a player to go to their draw section.

== Draw ==
=== Key ===
- Q = Qualifier
- WC = Wild card
- LL = Lucky loser
- Alt = Alternate
- SE = Special exempt
- PR = Protected ranking
- ITF = ITF entry
- JE = Junior exempt
- w/o = Walkover
- r = Retired
- d = Defaulted
- SR = Special ranking

=== Finals ===
Quarterfinals
1	(United States) Ivan Lendl	6	1
5	(Sweden) Mats Wilander	7	6
4	(Argentina) José Luis Clerc	6	6
(France) Thierry Tulasne	4	1
(Brazil) Marcos Hocevar	6	3	10
10	(Chile) Hans Gildemeister	3	6	8
(Brazil) Carlos Kirmayr	4	4
2	(Argentina) Guillermo Vilas	6	6

Semifinals
5	(Sweden) Mats Wilander	6	6	6
4	(Argentina) José Luis Clerc	7	1	3
(Brazil) Marcos Hocevar	1	4
2	(Argentina) Guillermo Vilas	6	6

Final
5	(Sweden) Mats Wilander	6	6	6
2	(Argentina) Guillermo Vilas	3	4	3

=== Top half ===
==== Section 1 ====
First round
1	(United States) I Lendl	6	7
(Sweden) H Simonsson	3	5
(Spain) J Soler	4	6	7
(Italy) C Panatta	6	2	5
Q	(South Africa) M Myburg	6	4	6
Q	(France) L Courteau	4	6	4
(Italy) A Panatta	6	4
13	(Peru) P Arraya	7	6
15	(Chile) P Rebolledo	4	3
(Italy) C Barazzutti	6	6
(Uruguay) J-L Damiani	2	5
(Spain) F Luna	6	7
(Sweden) J Nyström	6	6
(Spain) F Soler	2	1
(France) G Forget	4	3
5	(Sweden) M Wilander	6	6

Second round
1	(United States) I Lendl	7	6
(Spain) J Soler	6	3
Q	(South Africa) M Myburg	7	3	1
13	(Peru) P Arraya	5	6	6
(Italy) C Barazzutti	4	6	10
(Spain) F Luna	6	1	8
(Sweden) J Nyström	2	7	2
5	(Sweden) M Wilander	6	6	6

Third round
1	(United States) I Lendl	7	6
13	(Peru) P Arraya	5	4
(Italy) C Barazzutti	3	4
5	(Sweden) M Wilander	6	6

Quarterfinals
1	(United States) I Lendl	6	1
5	(Sweden) M Wilander	7	6

==== Section 2 ====
First round
4	(Argentina) J Luis Clerc	4	6	7
(Brazil) C Motta	6	0	5
(Spain) L Fargas	2	3
(Sweden) S Simonsson	6	6
(France) G Moretton	6	1
LL	(United States) J Gurfein	7	6
(Germany) D Keretić	7	6	6
12	(United States) M Dickson	5	7	4
9	(United States) E Dibbs	6	6	6
LL	(South Africa) B Pirow	7	2	1
(France) T Tulasne	6	6
(Hungary) Z Kuhárszky	1	1
(France) H Leconte	6	6
(Spain) A Gimenez	4	1
Q	(Spain) A Tous	6	6
8	(Czechoslovakia) T Smid	4	3

Second round
4	(Argentina) J Luis Clerc	3	7	6
(Sweden) S Simonsson	6	5	1
LL	(United States) J Gurfein	3	6	3
(Germany) D Keretić	6	1	6
9	(United States) E Dibbs	3	0
(France) T Tulasne	6	6
(France) H Leconte	6	3
Q	(Spain) A Tous	7	6

Third round
4	(Argentina) J Luis Clerc	7	6
(Germany) D Keretić	5	4
(France) T Tulasne	7	6	6
Q	(Spain) A Tous	5	7	4

Quarterfinals
4	(Argentina) J Luis Clerc	6	6
(France) T Tulasne	4	1

=== Bottom half ===
==== Section 3 ====
First round
6	(Ecuador) A Gómez	7	7
(New Zealand) B Derlin	6	5
(Chile) A Pierola	6	6
(Brazil) M Hocevar	7	7
Q	(France) G Rafaitin	6	6
(Federal Republic of Yugoslavia) Z Franulovic	2	4
(Sweden) A Järryd	2	2
16	(Paraguay) V Pecci	6	6
10	(Chile) H Gildemeister	6	6
Q	(Spain) J Aguilera	3	1
(Italy) G Rinaldini	6	6
(United States) J Brown	2	2
(Spain) J Lopez-Maeso	6	6	6
Q	(Italy) G Ocleppo	7	4	0
LL	(Bolivia) M Martinez	3	6	6
3	(Spain) J Higueras	6	0	0

Second round
6	(Ecuador) A Gómez	6	3	2
(Brazil) M Hocevar	4	6	6
Q	(France) G Rafaitin	2	1
16	(Paraguay) V Pecci	6	6
10	(Chile) H Gildemeister	3	6	6
(Italy) G Rinaldini	6	3	3
(Spain) J Lopez-Maeso	6	6
LL	(Bolivia) M Martinez	2	2

Third round
(Brazil) M Hocevar	6	7
16	(Paraguay) V Pecci	1	5
10	(Chile) H Gildemeister	6	7
(Spain) J Lopez-Maeso	4	5

Quarterfinals
(Brazil) M Hocevar	6	3	10
10	(Chile) H Gildemeister	3	6	8

==== Section 4 ====
First round
7	(Hungary) B Taroczy	7	6
(India) R Krishnan	6	2
Q	(Croatia) M Ostoja	0	4
(Brazil) C Kirmayr	6	6
LL	(Spain) M Mir	4	6	6
(Spain) J García Requena	6	0	4
LL	(Spain) F Ferrer	1	3
14	(Czechoslovakia) P Slozil	6	6
11	(New Zealand) C Lewis	6	6
Q	(Austria) B Pils	0	2
(Spain) J Avendaño	6	6
(Spain) G Urpí	2	4
(France) D Bedel	7	6
(New Zealand) J Simpson	6	1
(Sweden) P Hjertquist	5	2
2	(Argentina) G Vilas	7	6

Second round
7	(Hungary) B Taroczy	6	0	3
(Brazil) C Kirmayr	3	6	6
LL	(Spain) M Mir	3	1
14	(Czechoslovakia) P Slozil	6	6
11	(New Zealand) C Lewis	3	0
(Spain) J Avendaño	6	6
(France) D Bedel	3	1
2	(Argentina) G Vilas	6	6

Third round
(Brazil) C Kirmayr	7	6
14	(Czechoslovakia) P Slozil	5	2
(Spain) J Avendaño	6	2
2	(Argentina) G Vilas	7	6

Quarterfinals
(Brazil) C Kirmayr	4	4
2	(Argentina) G Vilas	6	6
