= 1984 Sovran Bank Classic – Doubles =

Doubles
- 1984 Sovran Bank Classic

Final
- Champions: (Czechoslovakia) Pavel Složil (United States) Ferdi Taygan
- Runners-up: (United States) Drew Gitlin (United States) Blaine Willenborg
- Score: 7–6^{(7–5)}, 6–1

Details
- Draw: 28
- Seeds: 8

Events
| Singles | Doubles |
- Washington Open

Mark Dickson and Cássio Motta were the defending champions, but lost in the quarterfinals to Bud Cox and Marc Flur.

Pavel Složil and Ferdi Taygan won the title by defeating Drew Gitlin and Blaine Willenborg 7–6^{(7–5)}, 6–1 in the final.

== Seeds ==
1. (Czechoslovakia) Pavel Složil / (United States) Ferdi Taygan (champions)
2. (United States) Sherwood Stewart / (Hungary) Balázs Taróczy (second round)
3. (United States) Mark Dickson / (Brazil) Cássio Motta (quarterfinals)
4. (United States) Ken Flach / (United States) Robert Seguso (second round)
5. (Australia) David Graham / (Australia) Laurie Warder (first round)
6. (United States) Chip Hooper / (United States) Van Winitsky (first round)
7. (United States) Drew Gitlin / (United States) Blaine Willenborg (final)
8. (United States) Gary Donnelly / (Czechoslovakia) Libor Pimek (first round)

== Draw ==
Key

- Q = Qualifier
- WC = Wild card
- LL = Lucky loser
- Alt = Alternate
- ITF = ITF entry
- PR = Protected ranking
- SR = Special ranking
- SE = Special exempt
- JE = Junior exempt
- JR = Junior Accelerator Programme entrant
- CO = College Accelerator Programme entrant
- NG = Next Gen Accelerator Program entrant
- w/o = Walkover
- r = Retired
- d = Defaulted

=== Finals ===
Semifinals
1 | (Czechoslovakia) Pavel Složil (United States) Ferdi Taygan | 6 | 6
(United States) Bud Cox (United States) Marc Flur | 4 | 2
(United States) Brian Gottfried (United States) Bruce Manson | 7 | 4 | 4
7 | (United States) Drew Gitlin (United States) Blaine Willenborg | 6 | 6 | 6

Final
1 | (Czechoslovakia) Pavel Složil (United States) Ferdi Taygan | 7^{7} | 6
7 | (United States) Drew Gitlin (United States) Blaine Willenborg | 6^{5} | 1

=== Top half ===
First round
(United States) T Moor (United States) E Van't Hof | 6 | 6
(United States) D Cassidy (United States) J Ross | 3 | 4
(Croatia) M Ostoja (United States) V Van Patten | 6 | 6
(United States) B Gilbert (United States) J Gurfein | 4 | 4
(United States) J Lapidus (Germany) W Popp | 6 | 7 | 6
8 | (United States) G Donnelly (Czechoslovakia) L Pimek | 7 | 6 | 4
(United States) B Nealon (Spain) G Urpí | 6 | 4
(United States) J Arias (Peru) P Arraya | 7 | 6
(Switzerland) Z Kuhárszky (Italy) C Panatta | 6 | 3
(United States) B Cox (United States) M Flur | 7 | 6
(Brazil) M Hocevar (Brazil) J Soares | 6 | 6
5 | (Australia) D Graham (Australia) L Warder | 4 | 4

Second round
1 | (Czechoslovakia) P Složil (United States) F Taygan | 6 | 6
(United States) T Moor (United States) E Van't Hof | 3 | 0
(Croatia) M Ostoja (United States) V Van Patten | 2 | 6 | 7
(United States) J Lapidus (Germany) W Popp | 6 | 3 | 6
3 | (United States) M Dickson (Brazil) C Motta | 7 | 6
(United States) J Arias (Peru) P Arraya | 5 | 4
(United States) B Cox (United States) M Flur | 6 | 7
(Brazil) M Hocevar (Brazil) J Soares | 4 | 5

Quarterfinals
1 | (Czechoslovakia) P Složil (United States) F Taygan | 6 | 5 | 6
(Croatia) M Ostoja (United States) V Van Patten | 1 | 7 | 1
3 | (United States) M Dickson (Brazil) C Motta | 4 | 7 | 2
(United States) B Cox (United States) M Flur | 6 | 5 | 6

Semifinals
1 | (Czechoslovakia) P Složil (United States) F Taygan | 6 | 6
(United States) B Cox (United States) M Flur | 4 | 2

=== Bottom half ===
First round
6 | (United States) C Hooper (United States) V Winitsky | 6 | 4 | 4
(United States) B Gottfried (United States) B Manson | 3 | 6 | 6
(United States) M Freeman (United States) D Saltz | 7 | 4 | 2
(Australia) B Drewett (Chile) B Prajoux | 6 | 6 | 6
(United States) E Fernández (Paraguay) F González | 6 | 6
(United States) C Strode (United States) C Wittus | 3 | 4
7 | (United States) D Gitlin (United States) B Willenborg | 2 | 6 | 6
(United States) J Canter (United States) D Tarr | 6 | 2 | 4
(United States) D Goldie (United States) T Farnsworth | 3 | 1
(United States) B Csipkay (United States) T Csipkay | 6 | 6
(New Zealand) C Lewis (New Zealand) D Mustard | 7 | 4 | 1
(Chile) H Gildemeister (Ecuador) A Gómez | 6 | 6 | 6

Second round
(United States) B Gottfried (United States) B Manson | 6 | 6
(Australia) B Drewett (Chile) B Prajoux | 4 | 4
(United States) E Fernández (Paraguay) F González | 6 | 3 | 6
4 | (United States) K Flach (United States) R Seguso | 3 | 6 | 1
7 | (United States) D Gitlin (United States) B Willenborg | 6 | 6
(United States) B Csipkay (United States) T Csipkay | 3 | 0
(Chile) H Gildemeister (Ecuador) A Gómez | 6 | 6
2 | (United States) S Stewart (Hungary) B Taróczy | 2 | 1

Quarterfinals
(United States) B Gottfried (United States) B Manson | 6 | 6
(United States) E Fernández (Paraguay) F González | 4 | 4
7 | (United States) D Gitlin (United States) B Willenborg | 7 | 4 | 6
(Chile) H Gildemeister (Ecuador) A Gómez | 6 | 6 | 3

Semifinals
(United States) B Gottfried (United States) B Manson | 7 | 4 | 4
7 | (United States) D Gitlin (United States) B Willenborg | 6 | 6 | 6
