= 1984 Torneo Godó =

- Date: 1–7 October
- Edition: 32nd
- Category: Grand Prix
- Draw: 64S / 32D
- Prize money: $200,000
- Surface: Clay / outdoor
- Location: Barcelona, Catalonia, Spain
- Venue: Real Club de Tenis Barcelona

Champions

Singles
- (Sweden) Mats Wilander

Doubles
- (Czechoslovakia) Pavel Složil / (Czechoslovakia) Tomáš Šmíd
← 1983 ·	Torneo Godó	· 1985 →

The 1984 Torneo Godó or Trofeo Conde de Godó was a men's tennis tournament that took place on outdoor clay courts at the Real Club de Tenis Barcelona in Barcelona, Catalonia in Spain. It was the 32nd edition of the tournament and was part of the 1984 Grand Prix circuit. It was held from 1 October until 7 October 1984. First-seeded Mats Wilander won his third consecutive singles title at the event.

This event also carried the joint denominations of the Campeonatos Internacionales de España or Spanish International Championships that was hosted at this venue and location, and was 17th edition to be held in Barcelona, and the 7th edition of the Open Marlborough (for sponsorship reasons).

== Finals ==
=== Singles ===
(Sweden) Mats Wilander defeated (Sweden) Joakim Nyström 7–6, 6–4, 0–6, 6–2

- It was Wilander's 2nd singles title of the year and 15th of his career.

=== Doubles ===
(Czechoslovakia) Pavel Složil / (Czechoslovakia) Tomáš Šmíd defeated (Argentina) Martín Jaite / (Paraguay) Víctor Pecci 6–2, 6–0
