= Fernando Soler (disambiguation) =

Fernando Soler (1896-1979) was a Mexican actor, director, screenwriter, and producer.

Fernando Soler may also refer to:

- Fernando Soler (tennis) (born 1961), Spanish tennis player and sports agent
- Fernando Soler (footballer) (born 1978), Argentine footballer
