= 1982 Donnay Indoor Championships – Doubles =

Doubles
- 1982 Donnay Indoor Championships

Final
- Champions: (Czechoslovakia) Pavel Složil (United States) Sherwood Stewart
- Runners-up: (United States) Tracy Delatte (United States) Chris Dunk
- Score: 6–4, 6–7, 7–5

Details
- Draw: 16
- Seeds: 4

Events
Singles	Doubles
- Donnay Indoor Championships

Sandy Mayer and Frew McMillan were the defending champions, but did not participate this year.

Pavel Složil and Sherwood Stewart won the title, defeating Tracy Delatte and Chris Dunk 6–4, 6–7, 7–5 in the final.

== Seeds ==
1. (United States) Peter Fleming / (United States) John McEnroe (quarterfinals, defaulted)
2. (Czechoslovakia) Pavel Složil / (United States) Sherwood Stewart (champions)
3. (United States) Fritz Buehning / (Australia) Kim Warwick (first round, defaulted)
4. (Australia) Paul McNamee / (United States) Tim Wilkison (quarterfinals)

== Draw ==
Key

- Q = Qualifier
- WC = Wild card
- LL = Lucky loser
- Alt = Alternate
- ITF = ITF entry
- PR = Protected ranking
- SR = Special ranking
- SE = Special exempt
- JE = Junior exempt
- JR = Junior Accelerator Programme entrant
- CO = College Accelerator Programme entrant
- NG = Next Gen Accelerator Program entrant
- w/o = Walkover
- r = Retired
- d = Defaulted

=== Draw ===
First round
1	(United States) P Fleming (United States) J McEnroe	6	6
(United States) S Giammalva Jr. (United States) T Mayotte	3	3
(United States) T Delatte (United States) C Dunk	6	7
(Australia) B Drewett (United States) N Saviano	4	6
4	(Australia) P McNamee (United States) T Wilkison	7	2	6
(United States) B Manson (United States) B Teacher	6	6	4
(United States) E Iskersky (Hungary) Z Kuharszky	6	7
(United States) CB Strode (United States) MS Strode	4	6
(United States) L Bourne (Australia) D Carter	6	6
(United States) J Chatman (Socialist Federal Republic of Yugoslavia) M Ostoja	3	4
(Belgium) B Boileau (Belgium) T Stevaux	DEF
3	(United States) F Buehning (Australia) K Warwick
(United States) P Du Pré (United States) R Lutz	7	6
(United Kingdom) J Feaver (Israel) S Glickstein	6	3
(Brazil) J Soares (West Germany) C Zipf	6	3	1
2	(Czechoslovakia) P Složil (United States) S Stewart	4	6	6

Quarterfinals
1	(United States) P Fleming (United States) J McEnroe
(United States) T Delatte (United States) C Dunk	DEF
4	(Australia) P McNamee (United States) T Wilkison	4	6
(United States) E Iskersky (Hungary) Z Kuharszky	6	7
(United States) L Bourne (Australia) D Carter	6	6
(Belgium) B Boileau (Belgium) T Stevaux	4	4
(United States) P Du Pré (United States) R Lutz	4	6
2	(Czechoslovakia) P Složil (United States) S Stewart	6	7

Semifinals
(United States) T Delatte (United States) C Dunk	6	3	7
(United States) E Iskersky (Hungary) Z Kuharszky	4	6	6
(United States) L Bourne (Australia) D Carter	3	5
2	(Czechoslovakia) P Složil (United States) S Stewart	6	7

Final
(United States) T Delatte (United States) C Dunk	4	7	5
2	(Czechoslovakia) P Složil (United States) S Stewart	6	6	7
