= 1982 Donnay Indoor Championships – Singles =

Singles
- 1982 Donnay Indoor Championships

Final
- Champion: (United States) Vitas Gerulaitis
- Runner-up: (Sweden) Mats Wilander
- Score: 4–6, 7–6, 6–2

Details
- Draw: 32
- Seeds: 8

Events
| Singles | Doubles |
- Donnay Indoor Championships

Jimmy Connors was the defending champion, but lost in the semifinals this year.

Vitas Gerulaitis won the title, defeating Mats Wilander 4–6, 7–6, 6–2 in the final.

== Seeds ==
1. (United States) John McEnroe (quarterfinals, withdrew)
2. (United States) Jimmy Connors (semifinals)
3. (United States) Vitas Gerulaitis (champion)
4. (United States) Brian Teacher (quarterfinals)
5. (United States) Tim Mayotte (quarterfinals)
6. (Israel) Shlomo Glickstein (semifinals)
7. (United States) Harold Solomon (first round)
8. (United States) Bruce Manson (first round)

== Draw ==
Key

- Q = Qualifier
- WC = Wild card
- LL = Lucky loser
- Alt = Alternate
- ITF = ITF entry
- PR = Protected ranking
- SR = Special ranking
- SE = Special exempt
- JE = Junior exempt
- JR = Junior Accelerator Programme entrant
- CO = College Accelerator Programme entrant
- NG = Next Gen Accelerator Program entrant
- w/o = Walkover
- r = Retired
- d = Defaulted

=== Finals ===
Semifinals
6 | (Israel) Shlomo Glickstein | 3 | 4
(Sweden) Mats Wilander | 6 | 6
3 | (United States) Vitas Gerulaitis | 6 | 7
2 | (United States) Jimmy Connors | 2 | 5

Final
(Sweden) Mats Wilander | 6 | 6 | 2
3 | (United States) Vitas Gerulaitis | 4 | 7 | 6

=== Top half ===
First round
1 | (United States) J McEnroe | w/o
(Australia) K Warwick
(Brazil) J Soares | 6 | 4 | 2
(Belgium) B Boileau | 3 | 6 | 6
(United States) P Du Pré | 6 | 6 | 3
(United States) L Bourne | 3 | 7 | 6
Q | (United States) M Gandolfo | 6 | 6 | 3
6 | (Israel) S Glickstein | 2 | 7 | 6
4 | (United States) B Teacher | 6 | 3 | 6
(Republic of Ireland) M Doyle | 3 | 6 | 3
(United States) E Iskersky | 7 | 6
(United States) S Giammalva Jr. | 6 | 3
(United States) N Saviano | 5 | 4
Q | (West Germany) H Theissen | 7 | 6
(Sweden) M Wilander | 6 | 6
8 | (United States) B Manson | 4 | 1

Second round
1 | (United States) J McEnroe | 6 | 6
(Belgium) B Boileau | 1 | 4
(United States) L Bourne | 3 | 5
6 | (Israel) S Glickstein | 6 | 7
4 | (United States) B Teacher | 6 | 6
(United States) E Iskersky | 3 | 4
Q | (West Germany) H Theissen | 3 | 3
(Sweden) M Wilander | 6 | 6

Quarterfinals
1 | (United States) J McEnroe
6 | (Israel) S Glickstein | w/o
4 | (United States) B Teacher | 3 | 4
(Sweden) M Wilander | 6 | 6

Semifinals
6 | (Israel) S Glickstein | 3 | 4
(Sweden) M Wilander | 6 | 6

=== Bottom half ===
First round
5 | (United States) T Mayotte | 6 | 6
(Belgium) T Stevaux | 2 | 4
(West Germany) U Pinner | 6 | 5 | 6
(Australia) D Carter | 4 | 7 | 2
(Czechoslovakia) P Složil | 6 | 1 | 2
(United States) T Wilkison | 3 | 6 | 6
Q | (United States) J Chatman | 6 | 6 | 1
3 | (United States) V Gerulaitis | 4 | 7 | 6
7 | (United States) H Solomon | 6 | 2 | 4
(United States) F Buehning | 3 | 6 | 6
(France) C Roger-Vasselin | 5 | 2
(United States) R Lutz | 7 | 6
(France) B Fritz | 7 | 6
(Hungary) Z Kuharszky | 5 | 2
Q | (South Africa) D Tarr | 4 | 2
2 | (United States) J Connors | 6 | 6

Second round
5 | (United States) T Mayotte | 7 | 6
(West Germany) U Pinner | 6 | 4
(United States) T Wilkison | 2 | 4
3 | (United States) V Gerulaitis | 6 | 6
(United States) F Buehning | 7 | 6
(United States) R Lutz | 5 | 4
(France) B Fritz | 5 | 0
2 | (United States) J Connors | 7 | 6

Quarterfinals
5 | (United States) T Mayotte | 3 | 4
3 | (United States) V Gerulaitis | 6 | 6
(United States) F Buehning | 6 | 2 | 2
2 | (United States) J Connors | 4 | 6 | 6

Semifinals
3 | (United States) V Gerulaitis | 6 | 7
2 | (United States) J Connors | 2 | 5
