= 1983 Geneva Open – Singles =

Singles
- 1983 Geneva Open

Final
- Champion: (Sweden) Mats Wilander
- Runner-up: (Sweden) Henrik Sundström
- Score: 3–6, 6–1, 6–3

Details
- Draw: 32
- Seeds: 8

Events
Singles	Doubles
← 1982 ·	Geneva Open	· 1984 →

Mats Wilander was the defending champion.

Wilander successfully defended his title, defeating Henrik Sundström 3–6, 6–1, 6–3 in the final.

== Seeds ==
1. (Sweden) Mats Wilander (champion)
2. (Argentina) Guillermo Vilas (semifinals)
3. (Sweden) Henrik Sundström (final)
4. (Czechoslovakia) Tomáš Šmíd (first round)
5. (Switzerland) Heinz Günthardt (quarterfinals)
6. (Sweden) Anders Järryd (semifinals)
7. (Hungary) Balázs Taróczy (second round)
8. (United States) Jimmy Brown (second round)

== Draw ==
=== Key ===
- Q = Qualifier
- WC = Wild card
- LL = Lucky loser
- Alt = Alternate
- SE = Special exempt
- PR = Protected ranking
- ITF = ITF entry
- JE = Junior exempt
- w/o = Walkover
- r = Retired
- d = Defaulted
- SR = Special ranking

=== Finals ===
Semifinals
1	(Sweden) Mats Wilander	1	6	6
6	(Sweden) Anders Järryd	6	4	2
3	(Sweden) Henrik Sundström	6	7
2	(Argentina) Guillermo Vilas	3	5

Final
1	(Sweden) Mats Wilander	3	6	6
3	(Sweden) Henrik Sundström	6	1	3

=== Top half ===
First round
1	(Sweden) M Wilander	6	6
(United States) E Dibbs	1	2
(Czechoslovakia) P Složil	7	6
(Czechoslovakia) S Birner	5	3
(Switzerland) C Mezzadri	4	2
(Switzerland) R Stadler	6	6
(Colombia) J Velasco Sr.	2	0
7	(Hungary) B Taróczy	6	6
4	(Czechoslovakia) T Šmíd	6	4	2
(Italy) C Panatta	4	6	6
(Hungary) Z Kuhárszky	6	7
(Switzerland) J Hlasek	4	5
Q	(Socialist Federal Republic of Yugoslavia) M Ostoja	6	3
Q	(Sweden) J Windahl	7	6
(West Germany) D Keretić	2	r
6	(Sweden) A Järryd	6

Second round
1	(Sweden) M Wilander	6	6
(Czechoslovakia) P Složil	1	1
(Switzerland) R Stadler	7	4	6
7	(Hungary) B Taróczy	5	6	3
(Italy) C Panatta	6	6
(Hungary) Z Kuhárszky	4	2
Q	(Sweden) J Windahl	6	5	1
6	(Sweden) A Järryd	4	7	6

Quarterfinals
1	(Sweden) M Wilander	6	7
(Switzerland) R Stadler	1	5
(Italy) C Panatta	4	4
6	(Sweden) A Järryd	6	6

Semifinals
1	(Sweden) M Wilander	1	6	6
6	(Sweden) A Järryd	6	4	2

=== Bottom half ===
First round
5	(Switzerland) H Günthardt	1	6	6
(Sweden) K Carlsson	6	1	2
(United States) J Gurfein	1	3
(Sweden) J Nyström	6	6
Q	(United States) H Solomon	6	6
(France) G Forget	4	2
(Sweden) H Simonsson	4	6
3	(Sweden) H Sundström	6	7
8	(United States) J Brown	6	6
(South Africa) E Edwards	3	4
Q	(Spain) R Vizcaíno	7	6
(South Africa) D Visser	5	2
(Spain) S Casal	4	6	3
(France) D Bedel	6	2	6
(Spain) J Avendaño	4	3
2	(Argentina) G Vilas	6	6

Second round
5	(Switzerland) H Günthardt	6	2	6
(Sweden) J Nyström	3	6	3
Q	(United States) H Solomon	4	3
3	(Sweden) H Sundström	6	6
8	(United States) J Brown	4	4
Q	(Spain) R Vizcaíno	6	6
(France) D Bedel	3	0
2	(Argentina) G Vilas	6	6

Quarterfinals
5	(Switzerland) H Günthardt	5	6	3
3	(Sweden) H Sundström	7	4	6
Q	(Spain) R Vizcaíno	1	0
2	(Argentina) G Vilas	6	6

Semifinals
3	(Sweden) H Sundström	6	7
2	(Argentina) G Vilas	3	5
