= 1983 Geneva Open =

- Date: 19–25 September
- Edition: 4th
- Category: Grand Prix
- Draw: 32S / 16D
- Prize money: $75,000
- Surface: Clay / outdoor
- Location: Geneva, Switzerland

Champions

Singles
- (Sweden) Mats Wilander

Doubles
- (Czechoslovakia) Stanislav Birner / (United States) Blaine Willenborg
- Geneva Open

The 1983 Geneva Open was a men's tennis tournament played on clay courts that was part of the 1983 Volvo Grand Prix. It was played at Geneva in Switzerland and took place from 19 September until 25 September 1983. First-seeded Mats Wilander won the singles title.

== Finals ==
=== Singles ===
(Sweden) Mats Wilander defeated (Sweden) Henrik Sundström 3–6, 6–1, 6–3

- It was Wilander's 6th singles title of the year and the 10th of his career.

=== Doubles ===
(Czechoslovakia) Stanislav Birner / (United States) Blaine Willenborg defeated (Sweden) Joakim Nyström / (Sweden) Mats Wilander 6–1, 2–6, 6–3

- It was Birner's only title of the year and the 1st of his career. It was Willenborg's only title of the year and the 1st of his career.
