= 1982 Geneva Open =

- Date: 20–26 September
- Edition: 3rd
- Category: Grand Prix
- Draw: 32S / 16D
- Prize money: $75,000
- Surface: Clay / outdoor
- Location: Geneva, Switzerland

Champions

Singles
- (Sweden) Mats Wilander

Doubles
- (Czechoslovakia) Pavel Složil / (Czechoslovakia) Tomáš Šmíd
- Geneva Open

The 1982 Geneva Open was a men's tennis tournament played on outdoor clay courts that was part of the 1982 Volvo Grand Prix. It was played at Geneva in Switzerland and was held from 20 September until 26 September 1982. Second-seeded Mats Wilander on the singles title.

== Finals ==
=== Singles ===
(Sweden) Mats Wilander defeated (Czechoslovakia) Tomáš Šmíd 7–5, 4–6, 6–4

- It was Wilander's 3rd singles title of the year and of his career.

=== Doubles ===
(Czechoslovakia) Pavel Složil / (Czechoslovakia) Tomáš Šmíd defeated (Australia) Carl Limberger / (South Africa) Mike Myburg 6–4, 6–0

- It was Složil's 5th title of the year and the 8th of his career. It was Šmíd's 7th title of the year and the 19th of his career.
