= 1982 Torneo Godó =

- Date: 4–10 October
- Edition: 30th
- Category: Grand Prix (Super Series)
- Draw: 64S / 32D
- Prize money: $200,000
- Surface: Clay / outdoor
- Location: Barcelona, Catalonia, Spain
- Venue: Real Club de Tenis Barcelona

Champions

Singles
- (Sweden) Mats Wilander

Doubles
- (Sweden) Anders Jarryd / (Sweden) Hans Simonsson
- Torneo Godó

The 1982 Torneo Godó or Trofeo Conde de Godó was a men's tennis tournament that took place on outdoor clay courts at the Real Club de Tenis Barcelona in Barcelona, Catalonia in Spain. It was the 30th edition of the tournament and was part of the Super Series of the 1982 Grand Prix circuit. It was held from 4 October until 10 October 1982. Fifth-seeded Mats Wilander won the singles title.

This event also carried the joint denominations of the Campeonatos Internacionales de España or Spanish International Championships that was hosted at this venue and location, and was 15th edition to be held in Barcelona, and the 5th edition of the Open Marlborough (for sponsorship reasons).

== Finals ==
=== Singles ===
(Sweden) Mats Wilander defeated (Argentina) Guillermo Vilas 6–3, 6–4, 6–3

- It was Wilander's 4th singles title of the year and of his career.

=== Doubles ===
(Sweden) Anders Jarryd / (Sweden) Hans Simonsson defeated (Brazil) Carlos Kirmayr / (Brazil) Cássio Motta 6–3, 6–2
