= 1982 Geneva Open – Singles =

Singles
- 1982 Geneva Open

Final
- Champion: (Sweden) Mats Wilander
- Runner-up: (Czechoslovakia) Tomáš Šmíd
- Score: 7–5, 4–6, 6–4

Details
- Draw: 32
- Seeds: 8

Events
Singles	Doubles
← 1981 ·	Geneva Open	· 1983 →

Björn Borg was the defending champion, but did not participate this year.

Mats Wilander won the title, defeating Tomáš Šmíd 7–5, 4–6, 6–4 in the final.

== Seeds ==
1. (United States) Vitas Gerulaitis (semifinals)
2. (Sweden) Mats Wilander (champion)
3. (Hungary) Balázs Taróczy (second round)
4. (Czechoslovakia) Tomáš Šmíd (final)
5. (Switzerland) Heinz Günthardt (second round)
6. (Czechoslovakia) Pavel Složil (second round)
7. (Brazil) Marcos Hocevar (first round)
8. (Italy) Claudio Panatta (quarterfinals)

== Draw ==
=== Key ===
- Q = Qualifier
- WC = Wild card
- LL = Lucky loser
- Alt = Alternate
- SE = Special exempt
- PR = Protected ranking
- ITF = ITF entry
- JE = Junior exempt
- w/o = Walkover
- r = Retired
- d = Defaulted
- SR = Special ranking

=== Finals ===
Semifinals
1	(United States) Vitas Gerulaitis
4	(Czechoslovakia) Tomáš Šmíd	DEF
(West Germany) Damir Keretić	1	4
2	(Sweden) Mats Wilander	6	6

Final
4	(Czechoslovakia) Tomáš Šmíd	5	6	4
2	(Sweden) Mats Wilander	7	4	6

=== Top half ===
First round
1	(United States) V Gerulaitis	6	2	6
(Italy) A Panatta	4	6	1
(United States) J Brown	6	6
(France) G Goven	2	3
(Colombia) J Velasco Sr.	3	6	6
(Sweden) S Edberg	6	2	0
Q	(Spain) S Casal	2	0
6	(Czechoslovakia) P Složil	6	6
4	(Czechoslovakia) T Šmíd	6	6
(Norway) M Rønneberg	1	2
(Spain) A Tous	0	6	4
Q	(Switzerland) R Stadler	6	4	6
(Switzerland) I Dupasquier	6	6
(Uruguay) JL Damiani	1	4
(Brazil) C Motta	4	2
8	(Italy) C Panatta	6	6

Second round
1	(United States) V Gerulaitis	6	6
(United States) J Brown	3	3
(Colombia) J Velasco Sr.	6	7
6	(Czechoslovakia) P Složil	1	6
4	(Czechoslovakia) T Šmíd	6	6
Q	(Switzerland) R Stadler	3	2
(Switzerland) I Dupasquier	3	0
8	(Italy) C Panatta	6	6

Quarterfinals
1	(United States) V Gerulaitis	7	6
(Colombia) J Velasco Sr.	5	1
4	(Czechoslovakia) T Šmíd	6	6
8	(Italy) C Panatta	2	4

Semifinals
1	(United States) V Gerulaitis
4	(Czechoslovakia) T Šmíd	DEF

=== Bottom half ===
First round
7	(Brazil) M Hocevar	5	3
Q	(France) G Forget	7	6
(Chile) A Pierola	1	2
(United States) J Gurfein	6	6
(Socialist Federal Republic of Yugoslavia) M Ostoja	2	2
(West Germany) D Keretić	6	6
(United States) E Adams	2	3
3	(Hungary) B Taróczy	6	6
5	(Switzerland) H Günthardt	7	6
(Czechoslovakia) S Birner	6	1
(Socialist Federal Republic of Yugoslavia) Ž Franulović	2	4
(France) T Tulasne	6	6
(Sweden) J Nyström	6	6
(Spain) Á Giménez	2	4
Q	(Argentina) A Gattiker	0	3
2	(Sweden) M Wilander	6	6

Second round
Q	(France) G Forget	0	5
(United States) J Gurfein	6	7
(West Germany) D Keretić	7	6
3	(Hungary) B Taróczy	5	2
5	(Switzerland) H Günthardt	1	4
(France) T Tulasne	6	6
(Sweden) J Nyström	6	0	1
2	(Sweden) M Wilander	3	6	6

Quarterfinals
(United States) J Gurfein	4	0
(West Germany) D Keretić	6	6
(France) T Tulasne	4	1
2	(Sweden) M Wilander	6	6

Semifinals
(West Germany) D Keretić	1	4
2	(Sweden) M Wilander	6	6
