= 1984 Sovran Bank Classic =

- Date: July 23–29
- Edition: 16th
- Category: Grand Prix
- Draw: 56S / 28D
- Prize money: $200,000
- Surface: Clay / outdoor
- Location: Washington, D.C., United States
- Venue: Rock Creek Park

Champions

Singles
- (Ecuador) Andrés Gómez

Doubles
- (Czechoslovakia) Pavel Složil / (United States) Ferdi Taygan
- Washington Open

The 1984 Sovran Bank Classic was a men's tennis tournament and was played on outdoor clay courts. The event was part of the 1984 Grand Prix circuit. It was the 16th edition of the tournament and was held at Rock Creek Park in Washington, D.C. from July 23 through July 29, 1984. Second-seeded Andrés Gómez won the singles title.

== Finals ==
=== Singles ===
(Ecuador) Andrés Gómez defeated (United States) Aaron Krickstein 6–2, 6–2

- It was Gomez' 3rd singles title of the year and the 7th of his career.

=== Doubles ===
(Czechoslovakia) Pavel Složil / (United States) Ferdi Taygan defeated (United States) Drew Gitlin / (United States) Blaine Willenborg 7–6^{(7–5)}, 6–1
