= Tom Csipkay =

American tennis player

- Country (sports): United States
- Born: Wyckoff, New Jersey

Singles
- Highest ranking: No. 386 (July 12, 1978)

Doubles
- Career record: 4–5
- Highest ranking: No. 200 (July 30, 1984)

Grand Slam doubles results
- US Open: 1R (1983)

Tom Csipkay is an American former professional tennis player.

== Biography ==
Csipkay, one of six siblings, grew up in Wyckoff, New Jersey. His elder brother Bill played professionally and one of his sisters Mary Ann was the women's head coach at Indiana State for 11 years.

A New Jersey state champion, Csipkay played collegiate tennis for Indiana State, graduating in 1982.

On the professional tour he had a doubles semi-final appearance at the 1983 Head Classic in Stowe with brother Bill, beating fourth seeds Vijay Amritraj and John Fitzgerald en route. He and Bill featured in the men's doubles main draw of the 1983 US Open, where they lost in the first round to another sibling pairing of Vijay and Anand Amritraj.
