= 1982 Geneva Open – Doubles =

Tennis tournament

Doubles
- 1982 Geneva Open

Final
- Champions: (Czechoslovakia) Pavel Složil (Czechoslovakia) Tomáš Šmíd
- Runners-up: (Australia) Carl Limberger (South Africa) Mike Myburg
- Score: 6–4, 6–0

Details
- Draw: 16
- Seeds: 4

Events
| Singles | Doubles |
- Geneva Open

Heinz Günthardt and Balázs Taróczy were the defending champions, but lost in the first round this year.

The second-seeded Pavel Složil and Tomáš Šmíd won the doubles title, defeating Carl Limberger and Mike Myburg 6–4, 6–0 in the final.

== Seeds ==
1. (Switzerland) Heinz Günthardt / (Hungary) Balázs Taróczy (first round)
2. (Czechoslovakia) Pavel Složil / (Czechoslovakia) Tomáš Šmíd (champions)
3. (Brazil) Marcos Hocevar / (Brazil) Cássio Motta (quarterfinals)
4. (Switzerland) Markus Günthardt / (Switzerland) Roland Stadler (first round)

== Draw ==
Key

- Q = Qualifier
- WC = Wild card
- LL = Lucky loser
- Alt = Alternate
- ITF = ITF entry
- PR = Protected ranking
- SR = Special ranking
- SE = Special exempt
- JE = Junior exempt
- JR = Junior Accelerator Programme entrant
- CO = College Accelerator Programme entrant
- NG = Next Gen Accelerator Program entrant
- w/o = Walkover
- r = Retired
- d = Defaulted

=== Draw ===
First round
1 | (Switzerland) H Günthardt (Hungary) B Taróczy | 4 | 6
(Argentina) A Gattiker (South Africa) B Pirow | 6 | 7
(Chile) A Pierola (Spain) A Tous | 6 | 6
(Switzerland) J Hlasek (Switzerland) Hans Ritschard | 0 | 3
4 | (Switzerland) H Günthardt (Switzerland) R Stadler | 2 | 2
(Sweden) J Nyström (Sweden) M Wilander | 6 | 6
(Australia) C Limberger (South Africa) M Myburg | 6 | 6
(Spain) S Casal (Spain) Á Giménez | 1 | 4
(United States) E Adams (United States) J Gurfein | 6 | 2 | 6
(Uruguay) JL Damiani (Socialist Federal Republic of Yugoslavia) Ž Franulović | 2 | 6 | 3
3 | (Brazil) R Hocevar (Brazil) C Motta | 6 | 3 | 6
(Italy) A Panatta (Italy) C Panatta | 3 | 6 | 3
(Czechoslovakia) S Birner (Socialist Federal Republic of Yugoslavia) M Ostoja | 6 | 6 | 7
(Switzerland) I Dupasquier (West Germany) D Keretić | 7 | 4 | 6
(France) G Goven (France) T Tulasne | 5 | 2
2 | (Czechoslovakia) P Složil (Czechoslovakia) T Šmíd | 7 | 6

Quarterfinals
(Argentina) A Gattiker (South Africa) B Pirow | 6 | 6
(Chile) A Pierola (Spain) A Tous | 3 | 4
(Sweden) J Nyström (Sweden) M Wilander | 4 | 7 | 3
(Australia) C Limberger (South Africa) M Myburg | 6 | 6 | 6
(United States) E Adams (United States) J Gurfein | 6 | 7
3 | (Brazil) R Hocevar (Brazil) C Motta | 4 | 6
(Czechoslovakia) S Birner (Socialist Federal Republic of Yugoslavia) M Ostoja | 6 | 1 | 3
2 | (Czechoslovakia) P Složil (Czechoslovakia) T Šmíd | 4 | 6 | 6

Semifinals
(Argentina) A Gattiker (South Africa) B Pirow | 6 | 5 | 3
(Australia) C Limberger (South Africa) M Myburg | 3 | 7 | 6
(United States) E Adams (United States) J Gurfein | 4 | 2
2 | (Czechoslovakia) P Složil (Czechoslovakia) T Šmíd | 6 | 6

Final
(Australia) C Limberger (South Africa) M Myburg | 4 | 0
2 | (Czechoslovakia) P Složil (Czechoslovakia) T Šmíd | 6 | 6
