= Ferrante Rocchi =

Italian tennis player

- Full name: Ferrante Rocchi Lanoir
- Country (sports): Italy
- Born: 11 April 1956 (age 69); San Benedetto del Tronto, Italy
- Height: 5 ft 11 in (180 cm)
- Plays: Left-handed

Singles
- Career record: 1–4
- Highest ranking: No. 153 (23 July 1984)

Doubles
- Career record: 2–5
- Highest ranking: No. 273 (9 September 1985)

Ferrante Rocchi Lanoir (born 11 April 1956) is a former professional tennis player from Italy.

== Biography ==
A left-handed player from San Benedetto del Tronto, Rocchi played on the professional tour in the 1980s. His best performance on the Grand Prix circuit came in doubles when he partnered with Roberto Vizcaíno to make the semi-finals of the 1984 Tel Aviv Open. As a singles player he had a top ranking of 153 and reached the round of 16 at Saint-Vincent in 1986.

Rocchi is the Director of the Villa Carpena tennis complex in Forlì.
