= 1982 Donnay Indoor Championships =

- Date: 8–14 March
- Edition: 2nd
- Category: Grand Prix
- Draw: 32S / 16D
- Prize money: $250,000
- Surface: Carpet / indoor
- Location: Brussels, Belgium

Champions

Singles
- (United States) Vitas Gerulaitis

Doubles
- (Czechoslovakia) Pavel Složil / (United States) Sherwood Stewart
← 1981 ·	Donnay Indoor Championships	· 1983 →

The 1982 Donnay Indoor Championships was a men's tennis tournament played on indoor carpet courts in Brussels in Belgium the event was part of the 1982 Volvo Grand Prix. It was the second edition of the tournament and was held from 8 March through 14 March 1982. Third-seeded Vitas Gerulaitis won the singles title.

== Finals ==
=== Singles ===
(United States) Vitas Gerulaitis defeated (Sweden) Mats Wilander, 4–6, 7–6, 6–2

- It was Gerulaitis' 1st singles title of the year and the 20th of his career.

=== Doubles ===
(Czechoslovakia) Pavel Složil / (United States) Sherwood Stewart defeated (United States) Tracy Delatte / (United States) Chris Dunk, 6–4, 6–7, 7–5
