= 1984 Tel Aviv Open =

- Date: September 10–17
- Edition: 5th
- Category: Grand Prix
- Draw: 32S / 16D
- Prize money: $75,000
- Surface: Hard / outdoor
- Location: Ramat HaSharon, Tel Aviv District, Israel
- Venue: Israel Tennis Centers

Champions

Singles
- (United States) Aaron Krickstein

Doubles
- (Australia) Peter Doohan / (South Africa) Brian Levine
- Tel Aviv Open

The 1984 Tel Aviv Open was a men's tennis tournament played on hard courts that was part of the 1984 Volvo Grand Prix. It was played at the Israel Tennis Centers in the Tel Aviv District city of Ramat HaSharon, Israel from September 10 through September 17, 1984. It was the fifth edition of the tournament. First-seeded Aaron Krickstein won the singles title.

== Finals ==
=== Singles ===
(United States) Aaron Krickstein defeated (Israel) Shahar Perkiss 6–4, 6–1

- It was Krickstein's 2nd title of the year and the 3rd of his career.

=== Doubles ===
(Australia) Peter Doohan / (South Africa) Brian Levine defeated (United Kingdom) Colin Dowdeswell / (Switzerland) Jakob Hlasek 6–3, 6–4

- It was Doohan's 2nd title of the year and the 2nd of his career. It was Levine's 2nd title of the year and the 2nd of his career.
