= Tomer Zimmerman =

Israeli tennis player

- Native name: תומר צימרמן
- Country (sports): Israel
- Born: 27 December 1966 (age 59)

Singles
- Career record: 0–1
- Highest ranking: No. 384 (18 Apr 1988)

Grand Slam singles results
- Wimbledon: Q1 (1988)

Doubles
- Career record: 1–2
- Highest ranking: No. 442 (18 Apr 1988)

Tomer Zimmerman (Hebrew: תומר צימרמן; born 27 December 1966) is an Israeli former professional tennis player.

A native of Tel Aviv, Zimmerman had a career best ranking of world number 384 in April 1988 and was runner-up at the 1987 Durban Challenger. He also featured in the qualifying draw at Wimbledon in 1988 and had multiple appearances at the Tel Aviv Open.

Zimmerman played collegiate tennis in the United States for Pepperdine University.

== ATP Challenger finals ==
=== Singles: 1 (0–1) ===
Result	Date	Tournament	Surface	Opponent	Score
Loss	Nov 1987	Durban, South Africa	Hard	(United States) Philip Johnson	2–6, 0–2 ret.
