= Mats Wilander career statistics =

This is a list of the main career statistics of Swedish former professional tennis player Mats Wilander whose career ran from 1980 until 1996.

== Grand Slam finals ==
=== Singles: 11 finals (7 titles, 4 runner-ups) ===
Result	Year	Championship	Surface	Opponents	Score
Win	1982	French Open	Clay	(Argentina) Guillermo Vilas	1–6, 7–6^{(8–6)}, 6–0, 6–4
Loss	1983	French Open	Clay	(France) Yannick Noah	2–6, 5–7, 6–7^{(3–7)}
Win	1983	Australian Open	Grass	(Czechoslovakia) Ivan Lendl	6–1, 6–4, 6–4
Win	1984	Australian Open (2)	Grass	(South Africa) Kevin Curren	6–7^{(5–7)}, 6–4, 7–6^{(7–3)}, 6–2
Win	1985	French Open (2)	Clay	(Czechoslovakia) Ivan Lendl	3–6, 6–4, 6–2, 6–2
Loss	1985	Australian Open	Grass	(Sweden) Stefan Edberg	4–6, 3–6, 3–6
Loss	1987	French Open	Clay	(Czechoslovakia) Ivan Lendl	5–7, 2–6, 6–3, 6–7^{(3–7)}
Loss	1987	US Open	Hard	(Czechoslovakia) Ivan Lendl	7–6^{(9–7)}, 0–6, 6–7^{(4–7)}, 4–6
Win	1988	Australian Open (3)	Hard	(Australia) Pat Cash	6–3, 6–7^{(3–7)}, 3–6, 6–1, 8–6
Win	1988	French Open (3)	Clay	(France) Henri Leconte	7–5, 6–2, 6–1
Win	1988	US Open	Hard	(Czechoslovakia) Ivan Lendl	6–4, 4–6, 6–3, 5–7, 6–4

=== Doubles: 3 (1 titles, 2 runner-ups) ===
Result	Year	Championship	Surface	Partner	Opponent	Score
Loss	1984	Australian Open	Grass	(Sweden) Joakim Nyström	(Australia) Mark Edmondson (United States) Sherwood Stewart	2–6, 2–6, 5–7
Win	1986	Wimbledon	Grass	(Sweden) Joakim Nyström	(United States) Gary Donnelly (United States) Peter Fleming	7–6^{(7–4)}, 6–3, 6–3
Loss	1986	US Open	Hard	(Sweden) Joakim Nyström	(Ecuador) Andrés Gómez (Socialist Federal Republic of Yugoslavia) Slobodan Živojinović	6–4, 3–6, 3–6, 6–4, 3–6

== Grand Prix year-end championships finals ==
=== Singles: 1 (1 runner-ups) ===
Result	Year	Championship	Surface	Opponent	Score
Loss	1987	Grand Prix Masters	Carpet (i)	(Czechoslovakia) Ivan Lendl	2–6, 2–6, 3–6

=== Doubles: 1 (1 runner-ups) ===
Result	Year	Championship	Surface	Partner	Opponent	Score
Loss	1985	Grand Prix Masters	Carpet (i)	(Sweden) Joakim Nyström	(Sweden) Stefan Edberg (Sweden) Anders Järryd	1–6, 6–7^{(5–7)}

== Grand Prix Super Series finals ==
=== Singles: 15 (8 wins –7 losses) ===
Result	Year	Tournament	Surface	Opponent	Score
Win	1983	Monte Carlo, France	Clay	(United States) Mel Purcell	6–1, 6–2, 6–3
Win	1983	Cincinnati, U.S.	Hard	(United States) John McEnroe	6–4, 6–4
Loss	1984	Monte Carlo, France	Clay	(Sweden) Henrik Sundström	3–6, 5–7, 2–6
Win	1984	Cincinnati, U.S.	Hard	(Sweden) Anders Järryd	7–6^{(7–4)}, 6–3
Loss	1984	Stockholm, Sweden	Hard (i)	(United States) John McEnroe	2–6, 6–3, 2–6
Loss	1985	Monte Carlo, France	Clay	(Czech Republic) Ivan Lendl	1–6, 3–6, 6–4, 4–6
Loss	1985	Cincinnati, U.S.	Hard	(Germany) Boris Becker	4–6, 2–6
Loss	1985	Tokyo, Japan	Carpet (i)	(Czech Republic) Ivan Lendl	0–6, 4–6
Loss	1986	Miami, U.S.	Hard	(Czech Republic) Ivan Lendl	6–3, 1–6, 6–7^{(5–7)}, 4–6
Win	1986	Cincinnati, U.S.	Hard	(United States) Jimmy Connors	6–4, 6–1
Loss	1986	Stockholm, Sweden	Hard (i)	(Sweden) Stefan Edberg	2–6, 1–6, 1–6
Win	1987	Monte Carlo, France	Clay	(United States) Jimmy Arias	4–6, 7–5, 6–1, 6–3
Win	1987	Rome, Italy	Clay	(Argentina) Martín Jaite	6–3, 6–4, 6–4
Win	1988	Miami, U.S.	Hard	(United States) Jimmy Connors	6–4, 4–6, 6–4, 6–4
Win	1988	Cincinnati, U.S.	Hard	(Sweden) Stefan Edberg	3–6, 7–6^{(7–5)}, 7–6^{(7–5)}

- Note: before the ATP took over running the men's professional tour in 1990 the Grand Prix Tour had a series of events that were precursors to the Masters Series known as the Grand Prix Tennis Super Series.

== ATP career finals ==
Legend Grand Slam (7-4) Year-end Championships (0-1) Grand Prix Super Series (8-7) Grand Prix Regular Series / ATP World Series (18-14)	Titles by surface Clay (20–11) Grass (2–1) Hard (9–8) Carpet (2–6)	Titles by setting Outdoor (30–15) Indoor (3–11)

=== Singles: 59 (33 titles / 26 runner-ups) ===
Result	W/L	Date	Tournament	Surface	Opponent	Score
Loss	0–1	Nov 1981	Bangkok, Thailand	Carpet (i)	(United States) Bill Scanlon	2–6, 3–6
Loss	0–2	Mar 1982	Brussels, Belgium	Carpet (i)	(United States) Vitas Gerulaitis	6–4, 6–7^{(2–7)}, 2–6
Win	1–2	Jun 1982	French Open, Paris	Clay	(Argentina) Guillermo Vilas	1–6, 7–6^{(8–6)}, 6–0, 6–4
Win	2–2	Jul 1982	Båstad, Sweden	Clay	(Sweden) Henrik Sundström	6–4, 6–4
Win	3–2	Sep 1982	Geneva, Switzerland	Clay	(Czech Republic) Tomáš Šmíd	7–5, 4–6, 6–4
Win	4–2	Oct 1982	Barcelona, Spain	Clay	(Argentina) Guillermo Vilas	6–3, 6–4, 6–3
Loss	4–3	Oct 1982	Basel, Switzerland	Hard (i)	(France) Yannick Noah	4–6, 2–6, 3–6
Loss	4–4	Nov 1982	Stockholm, Sweden	Hard (i)	(France) Henri Leconte	6–7^{(4–7)}, 3–6
Loss	4–5	Jan 1983	Guarujá, Brazil	Clay	(Argentina) Jose Luis Clerc	6–3, 5–7, 1–6
Win	5–5	Mar 1983	Monte Carlo, Monaco	Clay	(United States) Mel Purcell	6–1, 6–2, 6–3
Win	6–5	Apr 1983	Lisbon, Portugal	Clay	(France) Yannick Noah	2–6, 7–6^{(7–2)}, 6–4
Win	7–5	Apr 1983	Aix-en-Provence, France	Clay	(Spain) Sergio Casal	6–3, 6–2
Loss	7–6	Jun 1983	French Open, Paris	Clay	(France) Yannick Noah	2–6, 5–7, 6–7^{(3–7)}
Win	8–6	Jul 1983	Båstad, Sweden (2)	Clay	(Sweden) Anders Järryd	6–1, 6–2
Win	9–6	Aug 1983	Cincinnati, U.S.	Hard	(United States) John McEnroe	6–4, 6–4
Win	10–6	Sep 1983	Geneva, Switzerland (2)	Clay	(Sweden) Henrik Sundström	3–6, 6–1, 6–3
Win	11–6	Oct 1983	Barcelona, Spain (2)	Clay	(Argentina) Guillermo Vilas	6–0, 6–3, 6–1
Win	12–6	Nov 1983	Stockholm, Sweden	Hard (i)	(Czech Republic) Tomáš Šmíd	6–1, 7–5
Win	13–6	Dec 1983	Australian Open, Melbourne	Grass	(Czech Republic) Ivan Lendl	6–1, 6–4, 6–4
Loss	13–7	Mar 1984	Milan, Italy	Carpet (i)	(Sweden) Stefan Edberg	4–6, 2–6
Loss	13–8	Apr 1984	Monte Carlo, Monaco	Clay	(Sweden) Henrik Sundström	3–6, 5–7, 2–6
Win	14–8	Aug 1984	Cincinnati, U.S. (2)	Hard	(Sweden) Anders Järryd	7–6^{(7–4)}, 6–3
Win	15–8	Oct 1984	Barcelona, Spain (3)	Clay	(Sweden) Joakim Nyström	7–6^{(7–5)}, 6–4, 0–6, 6–2
Loss	15–9	Nov 1984	Stockholm, Sweden	Hard (i)	(United States) John McEnroe	2–6, 6–3, 2–6
Win	16–9	Dec 1984	Australian Open, Melbourne (2)	Grass	(United States) Kevin Curren	6–7^{(5–7)}, 6–4, 7–6^{(7–4)}, 6–2
Loss	16–10	Mar 1985	Brussels, Belgium	Hard (i)	(Sweden) Anders Jarryd	4–6, 6–3, 5–7
Loss	16–11	Apr 1985	Monte Carlo, Monaco	Clay	(Czechoslovakia) Ivan Lendl	1–6, 3–6, 6–4, 4–6
Win	17–11	Jun 1985	French Open, Paris (2)	Clay	(Czech Republic) Ivan Lendl	3–6, 6–4, 6–2, 6–2
Win	18–11	Jul 1985	Boston, U.S.	Clay	(Argentina) Martín Jaite	6–2, 6–4
Win	19–11	Jul 1985	Båstad, Sweden (3)	Clay	(Sweden) Stefan Edberg	6–1, 6–0
Loss	19–12	Aug 1985	Cincinnati, U.S.	Hard	(West Germany) Boris Becker	4–6, 2–6
Loss	19–13	Sep 1985	Geneva, Switzerland	Clay	(Czechoslovakia) Tomáš Šmíd	4–6, 4–6
Loss	19–14	Sep 1985	Barcelona, Spain	Clay	(France) Thierry Tulasne	6–0, 2–6, 6–3, 4–6, 0–6
Loss	19–15	Oct 1985	Tokyo, Japan	Carpet (i)	(Czechoslovakia) Ivan Lendl	0–6, 4–6
Loss	19–16	Dec 1985	Australian Open, Melbourne	Grass	(Sweden) Stefan Edberg	4–6, 3–6, 3–6
Loss	19–17	Feb 1986	Miami, U.S.	Hard	(Czechoslovakia) Ivan Lendl	6–3, 1–6, 6–7^{(5–7)}, 4–6
Win	20–17	Mar 1986	Brussels, Belgium	Carpet (i)	(Australia) Broderick Dyke	6–2, 6–3
Loss	20–18	Jul 1986	Båstad, Sweden	Clay	(Spain) Emilio Sanchez	6–7^{(5–7)}, 6–4, 4–6
Win	21–18	Aug 1986	Cincinnati, U.S. (3)	Hard	(United States) Jimmy Connors	6–4, 6–1
Loss	21–19	Nov 1986	Stockholm, Sweden	Hard (i)	(Sweden) Stefan Edberg	2–6, 1–6, 1–6
Win	22–19	Mar 1987	Brussels, Belgium (2)	Carpet (i)	(United States) John McEnroe	6–3, 6–4
Win	23–19	Apr 1987	Monte Carlo, Monaco (2)	Clay	(United States) Jimmy Arias	4–6, 7–5, 6–1, 6–3
Win	24–19	May 1987	Rome, Italy	Clay	(Argentina) Martín Jaite	6–3, 6–4, 6–4
Loss	24–20	Jun 1987	French Open, Paris	Clay	(Czechoslovakia) Ivan Lendl	5–7, 2–6, 6–3, 6–7^{(3–7)}
Win	25–20	Jul 1987	Boston, U.S. (2)	Clay	(Sweden) Kent Carlsson	7–6^{(7–5)}, 6–1
Win	26–20	Jul 1987	Indianapolis, U.S.	Clay	(Sweden) Kent Carlsson	7–5, 6–3
Loss	26–21	Sep 1987	US Open, New York	Hard	(Czechoslovakia) Ivan Lendl	7–6^{(9–7)}, 0–6, 6–7^{(4–7)}, 4–6
Loss	26–22	Sep 1987	Barcelona, Spain	Clay	(Argentina) Martín Jaite	6–7^{(5–7)}, 4–6, 6–4, 6–0, 4–6
Loss	26–23	Dec 1987	Masters, New York, U.S.	Carpet (i)	(Czechoslovakia) Ivan Lendl	2–6, 2–6, 3–6
Win	27–23	Jan 1988	Australian Open, Melbourne (3)	Hard	(Australia) Pat Cash	6–3, 6–7^{(3–7)}, 3–6, 6–1, 8–6
Win	28–23	Mar 1988	Miami, U.S.	Hard	(United States) Jimmy Connors	6–4, 4–6, 6–4, 6–4
Win	29–23	Jun 1988	French Open, Paris, France (3)	Clay	(France) Henri Leconte	7–5, 6–2, 6–1
Win	30–23	Aug 1988	Cincinnati, U.S. (4)	Hard	(Sweden) Stefan Edberg	3–6, 7–6^{(7–5)}, 7–6^{(7–5)}
Win	31–23	Sep 1988	US Open, New York	Hard	(Czech Republic) Ivan Lendl	6–4, 4–6, 6–3, 5–7, 6–4
Win	32–23	Sep 1988	Palermo, Italy	Clay	(Sweden) Kent Carlsson	6–1, 3–6, 6–4
Loss	32–24	Jul 1989	Boston, U.S.	Clay	(Ecuador) Andrés Gómez	1–6, 4–6
Loss	32–25	Oct 1990	Lyon, France	Carpet (i)	(Switzerland) Marc Rosset	3–6, 2–6
Win	33–25	Nov 1990	Itaparica, Brazil	Hard	(Uruguay) Marcelo Filippini	6–1, 6–2
Loss	33–26	May 1996	Pinehurst, U.S.	Clay	(Brazil) Fernando Meligeni	4–6, 2–6

=== Doubles: 18 (7 titles / 11 runner-ups) ===
Result	W/L	Date	Tournament	Surface	Partner	Opponents	Score
Loss	0–1	Jul 1982	Båstad, Sweden	Clay	(Sweden) Joakim Nyström	(Sweden) Anders Järryd (Sweden) Hans Simonsson	6–0, 3–6, 6–7
Loss	0–2	Mar 1983	Brussels, Belgium	Carpet (i)	(Sweden) Hans Simonsson	(Switzerland) Heinz Günthardt (Hungary) Balázs Taróczy	2–6, 4–6
Win	1–2	Jul 1983	Båstad, Sweden	Clay	(Sweden) Joakim Nyström	(Sweden) Anders Järryd (Sweden) Hans Simonsson	1–6, 7–6, 7–6
Loss	1–3	Sep 1983	Geneva, Switzerland	Clay	(Sweden) Joakim Nyström	(Czechoslovakia) Stanislav Birner (United States) Blaine Willenborg	1–6, 6–2, 3–6
Loss	1–4	Apr 1984	Monte Carlo, Monaco	Clay	(Sweden) Jan Gunnarsson	(Australia) Mark Edmondson (United States) Sherwood Stewart	2–6, 1–6
Win	2–4	Sep 1984	Geneva, Switzerland	Clay	(Denmark) Michael Mortensen	(Belgium) Libor Pimek (Czech Republic) Tomáš Šmíd	6–1, 3–6, 7–5
Loss	2–5	Dec 1984	Australian Open, Melbourne	Grass	(Sweden) Joakim Nyström	(Australia) Mark Edmondson (United States) Sherwood Stewart	2–6, 2–6, 5–7
Win	3–5	Jan 1985	Philadelphia, U.S.	Carpet (i)	(Sweden) Joakim Nyström	(Poland) Wojtek Fibak (United States) Sandy Mayer	3–6, 6–2, 6–2
Win	4–5	May 1985	Rome, Italy	Clay	(Sweden) Anders Järryd	(United States) Ken Flach (United States) Robert Seguso	4–6, 6–3, 6–2
Loss	4–6	Aug 1985	Cincinnati, U.S.	Hard	(Sweden) Joakim Nyström	(Sweden) Stefan Edberg (Sweden) Anders Järryd	6–4, 2–6, 3–6
Loss	4–7	Jan 1986	Masters, New York	Carpet (i)	(Sweden) Joakim Nyström	(Sweden) Stefan Edberg (Sweden) Anders Järryd	1–6, 6–7
Loss	4–8	Apr 1986	Monte Carlo, Monaco	Clay	(Sweden) Joakim Nyström	(France) Guy Forget (France) Yannick Noah	4–6, 6–3, 4–6
Win	5–8	Jul 1986	Wimbledon, London	Grass	(Sweden) Joakim Nyström	(United States) Gary Donnelly (United States) Peter Fleming	7–6, 6–3, 6–3
Loss	5–9	Sep 1986	US Open, New York	Hard	(Sweden) Joakim Nyström	(Ecuador) Andrés Gómez (Socialist Federal Republic of Yugoslavia) Slobodan Živojinović	6–4, 3–6, 3–6, 6–4, 3–6
Loss	5–10	Jul 1987	Boston, U.S.	Clay	(Sweden) Joakim Nyström	(Chile) Hans Gildemeister (Ecuador) Andrés Gómez	6–7, 6–3, 1–6
Loss	5–11	Jul 1987	Indianapolis, U.S.	Clay	(Sweden) Joakim Nyström	(Australia) Laurie Warder (United States) Blaine Willenborg	0–6, 3–6
Win	6–11	Aug 1994	Prague, Czech Republic	Clay	(Czech Republic) Karel Nováček	(Czech Republic) Tomáš Krupa (Czech Republic) Pavel Vízner	w/o
Win	7–11	Oct 1994	Santiago, Chile	Clay	(Czech Republic) Karel Nováček	(Spain) Tomás Carbonell (Spain) Francisco Roig	4–6, 7–6, 7–6

== Singles performance timeline ==
Key
W	F	SF	QF	#R	RR	Q#	DNQ	A	NH

(W) winner; (F) finalist; (SF) semifinalist; (QF) quarterfinalist; (#R) rounds 4, 3, 2, 1; (RR) round-robin stage; (Q#) qualification round; (DNQ) did not qualify; (A) absent; (NH) not held; (SR) strike rate (events won / competed); (W–L) win–loss record.

Tournament	1980	1981	1982	1983	1984	1985	1986	1987	1988	1989	1990	1991	1992	1993	1994	1995	1996	SR	W–L
Grand Slam tournaments
Australian Open	A	1R	A	W	W	F	NH	A	W	2R	SF	4R	A	A	4R	1R	A	3 / 10	36–7
French Open	A	A	W	F	SF	W	3R	F	W	QF	A	2R	A	A	1R	2R	2R	3 / 12	47–9
Wimbledon	Q1	3R	4R	3R	2R	1R	4R	QF	QF	QF	A	A	A	A	A	3R	A	0 / 10	25–10
US Open	A	A	4R	QF	QF	SF	4R	F	W	2R	1R	A	A	3R	1R	2R	A	1 / 12	36–11
Win–loss	0–0	2–2	13–2	18–3	16–3	17–3	8–3	16–3	25–1	10–4	5–2	4–2	0–0	2–1	3–3	4–4	1–1	7 / 44	144–37
Year-end championship
Tennis Masters Cup	did not qualify		1R	SF	SF	QF	SF	F	RR	did not qualify								0 / 7	9–10
Grand Prix											ATP Super 9								
Indian Wells	A	A	A	A	A	A	QF	SF	A	A	1R	A	A	A	2R	2R	1R	0 / 6	7–6
Miami	A	A	A	A	A	4R	F	QF	W	3R	A	A	A	A	1R	QF	1R	1 / 8	26–7
Monte Carlo	A	A	A	W	F	F	SF	W	3R	SF	A	2R	A	A	A	A	A	2 / 8	26–6
Hamburg	A	3R	QF	QF	SF	SF	A	A	A	A	A	A	A	A	A	A	A	0 / 5	13–5
Rome	A	A	SF	A	2R	SF	SF	W	3R	3R	A	1R	A	A	A	1R	A	1 / 9	23–8
Canada	A	A	3R	2R	A	A	A	A	A	A	A	A	A	A	A	SF	A	0 / 3	6–3
Cincinnati	A	A	1R	W	W	F	W	3R	W	SF	2R	A	A	A	1R	1R	A	4 / 11	36–7
Stockholm	1R	QF	F	W	F	1R	F	2R	3R	SF	2R	A	A	A	A	World Series		0 / 11	26–11
Tokyo Indoor	A	A	A	A	QF	F	A	A	A	A	Championship Series						NH	0 / 2	5–2
Paris	A	A	A	A	A	A	A	A	A	1R	1R	A	A	A	A	A	A	0 / 2	0–2
Win–loss	0–1	2–1	9–4	14–3	20–5	19–7	23–4	20–4	17–3	14–6	2–4	1–2	0–0	0–0	1–3	9–5	0–2	8 / 62	151–54
Career Statistics
Tournaments played	4	10	20	20	15	20	14	21	14	15	14	10	0	7	20	18	11	233	
Finals	0	1	7	11	6	10	5	9	6	1	2	0	0	0	0	0	1	59	
Titles	0	0	4	9	3	3	2	5	6	0	1	0	0	0	0	0	0	33	
Hard win–loss	0–0	3–1	20–6	23–3	14–2	13–4	21–4	15–6	29–2	8–5	15–8	5–2	0–0	2–4	10–12	14–11	0–3	192–73	
Clay win–loss	1–3	4–6	36–5	42–2	24–7	40–7	19–4	40–4	19–4	15–7	2–3	3–6	0–0	1–2	7–8	4–7	7–5	264–80	
Grass win–loss	0–0	2–3	3–1	12–1	7–1	6–3	3–1	4–2	4–1	7–2	0–0	0–1	0–0	0–0	0–0	2–1	0–0	50–17	
Carpet win–loss	0–1	4–2	2–6	5–5	9–4	10–7	11–4	12–6	1–4	4–4	5–3	1–1	0–0	0–1	0–0	1–1	0–3	65–52	
Overall win–loss	1–4	13–12	61–18	82–11	54–14	69–21	54–13	71–18	53–11	34–18	22–14	9–10	0–0	3–7	17–20	21–20	7–11	571–222	
Win (%)	20%	52%	77%	88%	79%	77%	81%	80%	83%	65%	61%	47%	–	30%	46%	51%	39%	72.01%	
Year-end ranking	283	69	7	4	4	3	3	3	1	12	41	159		330	129	46	196		

== Top 10 wins ==
Season	1980	1981	1982	1983	1984	1985	1986	1987	1988	1989	1990	1991	1992	1993	1994	1995	1996	Total
Wins	0	0	8	10	7	7	6	10	8	0	1	1	0	0	1	3	0	62

#	Player	Rank	Event	Surface	Rd	Score	WR
1982
1.	(Czechoslovakia) Ivan Lendl	3	French Open, Paris, France	Clay	4R	4–6, 7–5, 3–6, 6–4, 6–2	18
2.	(United States) Vitas Gerulaitis	9	French Open, Paris, France	Clay	QF	6–3, 6–3, 4–6, 6–4	18
3.	(Argentina) José Luis Clerc	6	French Open, Paris, France	Clay	SF	7–5, 6–2, 1–6, 7–5	18
4.	(Argentina) Guillermo Vilas	4	French Open, Paris, France	Clay	F	1–6, 7–6^{(8–6)}, 6–0, 6–4	18
5.	(United States) Eliot Teltscher	7	Davis Cup, St. Louis, United States	Carpet (i)	RR	6–4, 7–5, 3–6, 3–6, 6–0	11
6.	(Czechoslovakia) Ivan Lendl	3	Barcelona, Spain	Clay	QF	7–6, 6–1	11
7.	(Argentina) José Luis Clerc	9	Barcelona, Spain	Clay	SF	6–7, 6–1, 6–3	11
8.	(Argentina) Guillermo Vilas	4	Barcelona, Spain	Clay	F	6–3, 6–4, 6–3	11
1983
9.	(United States) John McEnroe	2	French Open, Paris, France	Clay	QF	1–6, 6–2, 6–4, 6–0	5
10.	(Spain) José Higueras	7	French Open, Paris, France	Clay	SF	7–5, 6–7, 6–3, 6–0	5
11.	(Czechoslovakia) Ivan Lendl	2	Cincinnati, United States	Hard	SF	6–0, 6–3	6
12.	(United States) John McEnroe	1	Cincinnati, United States	Hard	F	6–4, 6–4	6
13.	(Argentina) Guillermo Vilas	10	Davis Cup, Stockholm, Sweden	Hard (i)	RR	6–4, 6–3, 6–4	5
14.	(Argentina) José Luis Clerc	8	Davis Cup, Stockholm, Sweden	Hard (i)	RR	6–1, 6–2	5
15.	(Argentina) Guillermo Vilas	10	Barcelona, Spain	Clay	F	6–0, 6–3, 6–1	5
16.	(United States) John McEnroe	2	Australian Open, Melbourne, Australia	Grass	SF	4–6, 6–3, 6–4, 6–3	5
17.	(Czechoslovakia) Ivan Lendl	1	Australian Open, Melbourne, Australia	Grass	F	6–1, 6–4, 6–4	5
18.	(Spain) José Higueras	7	Masters, New York, United States	Carpet (i)	QF	7–6, 6–2	4
1984
19.	(France) Yannick Noah	6	Monte Carlo, Monaco	Clay	SF	6–2, 6–3	4
20.	(France) Yannick Noah	6	French Open, Paris, France	Clay	QF	7–6, 2–6, 3–6, 6–3, 6–3	4
21.	(United States) Jimmy Connors	3	Cincinnati, United States	Hard	SF	7–6, 1–6, 7–6	4
22.	(Czechoslovakia) Ivan Lendl	3	Davis Cup, Båstad, Sweden	Clay	RR	6–3, 4–6, 6–2	4
23.	(Sweden) Henrik Sundström	8	Barcelona, Spain	Clay	SF	0–6, 7–6, 6–1	4
24.	(United States) Jimmy Connors	2	Stockholm, Sweden	Hard (i)	SF	6–7, 6–3, 6–3	4
25.	(United States) Jimmy Connors	2	Davis Cup, Gothenburg, Sweden	Clay (i)	RR	6–1, 6–3, 6–3	4
1985
26.	(Australia) Pat Cash	9	Brussels, Belgium	Carpet (i)	SF	6–3, 7–6	4
27.	(United States) Aaron Krickstein	10	Monte Carlo, Monaco	Clay	SF	6–2, 6–3	4
28.	(United States) John McEnroe	1	French Open, Paris, France	Clay	SF	6–1, 7–5, 7–5	4
29.	(Czechoslovakia) Ivan Lendl	2	French Open, Paris, France	Clay	F	3–6, 6–4, 6–2, 6–2	4
30.	(Sweden) Anders Järryd	8	US Open, New York, United States	Hard	QF	2–6, 6–2, 5–0, ret.	4
31.	(Ecuador) Andrés Gómez	10	Tokyo, Japan	Carpet (i)	QF	6–4, 2–6, 7–6^{(7–5)}	3
32.	(United States) Johan Kriek	10	Australian Open, Melbourne, Australia	Grass	QF	6–3, 7–5, 6–2	3
1986
33.	(Sweden) Stefan Edberg	6	Boca West, United States	Hard	SF	6–4, 1–0, ret.	3
34.	(Sweden) Joakim Nyström	8	Brussels, Belgium	Carpet (i)	SF	2–6, 6–4, 6–2	3
35.	(Sweden) Stefan Edberg	4	Cincinnati, United States	Hard	SF	6–4, 6–3	2
36.	(United States) Jimmy Connors	6	Cincinnati, United States	Hard	F	6–4, 6–1	2
37.	(Sweden) Joakim Nyström	7	Masters, New York, United States	Carpet (i)	RR	6–7, 6–3, 6–3	3
38.	(France) Henri Leconte	6	Masters, New York, United States	Carpet (i)	RR	6–1, 7–5	3
1987
39.	(United States) John McEnroe	9	Brussels, Belgium	Carpet (i)	F	6–3, 6–4	6
40.	(Ecuador) Andrés Gómez	10	Rome, Italy	Clay	QF	6–1, 7–6	4
41.	(United States) John McEnroe	8	Rome, Italy	Clay	SF	6–1, 6–3	4
42.	(France) Yannick Noah	6	French Open, Paris, France	Clay	QF	6–4, 6–3, 6–2	4
43.	(West Germany) Boris Becker	2	French Open, Paris, France	Clay	SF	6–4, 6–1, 6–2	4
44.	(Czechoslovakia) Miloslav Mečíř	5	US Open, New York, United States	Hard	QF	6–3, 6–7, 6–4, 7–6	3
45.	(Sweden) Stefan Edberg	2	US Open, New York, United States	Hard	SF	6–4, 3–6, 6–3, 6–4	3
46.	(Czechoslovakia) Miloslav Mečíř	6	Masters, New York, United States	Carpet (i)	RR	6–4, 6–1	3
47.	(Australia) Pat Cash	7	Masters, New York, United States	Carpet (i)	RR	7–6, 6–3	3
48.	(Sweden) Stefan Edberg	2	Masters, New York, United States	Carpet (i)	SF	6–2, 4–6, 6–3	3
1988
49.	(Sweden) Stefan Edberg	2	Australian Open, Melbourne, Australia	Hard	SF	6–0, 6–7, 6–3, 3–6, 6–1	3
50.	(Australia) Pat Cash	7	Australian Open, Melbourne, Australia	Hard	F	6–3, 6–7^{(3–7)}, 3–6, 6–1, 8–6	3
51.	(United States) Jimmy Connors	6	Miami, United States	Hard	F	6–4, 4–6, 6–4, 6–4	2
52.	(France) Yannick Noah	10	Davis Cup, Båstad, Sweden	Clay	RR	2–6, 13–11, 6–3, 3–6, 6–0	3
53.	(Sweden) Stefan Edberg	3	Cincinnati, United States	Hard	F	3–6, 7–6^{(7–5)}, 7–6^{(7–5)}	2
54.	(Czechoslovakia) Ivan Lendl	1	US Open, New York, United States	Hard	F	6–4, 4–6, 6–3, 5–7, 6–4	2
55.	(Sweden) Kent Carlsson	6	Palmero, Italy	Clay	F	6–1, 3–6, 6–4	1
56.	(France) Henri Leconte	9	Masters, New York, United States	Carpet (i)	RR	6–2, 6–4	1
1990
57.	(West Germany) Boris Becker	2	Australian Open, Melbourne, Australia	Hard	QF	6–4, 6–4, 6–2	15
1991
58.	(United States) Brad Gilbert	10	Australian Open, Melbourne, Australia	Hard	3R	7–6^{(8–6)}, 6–1, 6–4	47
1994
59.	(United States) Todd Martin	9	Indianapolis, United States	Hard	2R	6–4, 1–6, 6–3	138
1995
60.	(South Africa) Wayne Ferreira	8	Montreal, Canada	Hard	3R	6–3, 6–2	102
61.	(Russia) Yevgeny Kafelnikov	6	Montreal, Canada	Hard	QF	7–5, 7–6^{(7–4)}	102
62.	(Switzerland) Marc Rosset	10	New Haven, United States	Hard	QF	6–7^{(8–10)}, 7–5, 7–5	61
