= Bill Csipkay =

American tennis player

- Country (sports): United States
- Born: Wyckoff, New Jersey

Singles
- Career record: 0–4
- Highest ranking: No. 353 (Jan 2, 1984)

Doubles
- Career record: 4–7
- Highest ranking: No. 186 (Aug 6, 1984)

Grand Slam doubles results
- US Open: 1R (1983)

Bill Csipkay is an American former professional tennis player.

A native of Wyckoff, New Jersey, Csipkay is the eldest of six children born to Ann and Eugene Csipkay. He played in three consecutive state championships on the Ramapo High School team and received a full scholarship to North Carolina State University, where he was a doubles partner of John Sadri. Graduating in 1979, Csipkay was ranked in the world's top 200 for doubles and appeared in the doubles main draw of the 1983 US Open, with his brother Tom.

== ATP Challenger finals ==
=== Doubles: 1 (0–1) ===
Result	No.	Date	Tournament	Surface	Partner	Opponents	Score
Loss	1.	Jul 1978	Raleigh Challenger, Raleigh, North Carolina	Clay	(United States) John Sadri	(Paraguay) Francisco González (United States) Chris Sylvan	2–6, 6–3, 3–6
