= 1985 Torneo Godó =

- Date: 23–29 September
- Edition: 33rd
- Category: Grand Prix
- Draw: 64S / 32D
- Prize money: $210,000
- Surface: Clay / outdoor
- Location: Barcelona, Catalonia, Spain]
- Venue: Real Club de Tenis Barcelona

Champions

Singles
- (France) Thierry Tulasne

Doubles
- (Spain) Sergio Casal / (Spain) Emilio Sánchez
- Torneo Godó

The 1985 Torneo Godó was a men's professional tennis tournament that took place on outdoor clay courts at the Real Club de Tenis Barcelona in Barcelona, Catalonia in Spain from 23 September until 29 September 1985. It was the 32nd edition of the tournament and was part of the 1984 Grand Prix circuit. Unseeded Thierry Tulasne won the singles title.

This event also carried the joint denomination of the Campeonatos Internacionales de España or Spanish International Championships that was hosted at this venue and location, and was 18th edition to be held in Barcelona.

== Finals ==
=== Singles ===
(France) Thierry Tulasne defeated (Sweden) Mats Wilander, 0–6, 6–2, 3–6, 6–4, 6–0

- It was Tulasne's 3rd and last singles title of the year and the 4th of his career.

=== Doubles ===
(Spain) Sergio Casal / (Spain) Emilio Sánchez defeated (Sweden) Jan Gunnarsson / (Denmark) Michael Mortensen, 6–3, 6–3
