= Trevor Allan (tennis) =

Australian tennis player

- Country (sports): Australia
- Residence: Marseille, France
- Born: 17 August 1955 (age 70); Maitland, Australia
- Height: 1.78 m (5 ft 10 in)
- Plays: Left-handed
- Prize money: $79,423

Singles
- Career record: 23–34
- Career titles: 0
- Highest ranking: No. 57 (16 July 1984)

Grand Slam singles results
- Australian Open: 1R (1974)
- French Open: 2R(1983 -1985)
- Wimbledon: 1R (1985)

Doubles
- Career record: 0–7
- Career titles: 0
- Highest ranking: No. 302 (12 August 1985)

Grand Slam doubles results
- French Open: 1R (1983)

Trevor Allan (born 17 August 1955) is a retired professional tennis player from Australia. He reached his career-high singles ranking of World No. 57 in July 1984.

== Life ==
Trevor Allan was born in Australia but as his tennis career progressed he moved to France and after retirement he became a tennis coach in Complexe Sportif René Magnac in Marseille. He was Arnaud Clément's coach in Marseille.
