= Erick Iskersky =

American tennis player (born 1958)

- Country (sports): United States
- Residence: Columbus, Ohio
- Born: January 25, 1958 (age 68) Toledo, Ohio, US
- Height: 5 ft 11 in (1.80 m)
- Plays: Right-handed

Singles
- Career record: 33–61
- Career titles: 1
- Highest ranking: No. 64 (March 1982)

Grand Slam singles results
- French Open: 1R (1982)
- Wimbledon: 1R (1979)
- US Open: 2R (1978) 1R (1982)

Doubles
- Career record: 21–42
- Career titles: 0
- Highest ranking: No. 96 (September 24, 1984)

Grand Slam doubles results
- French Open: 1R (1982)
- US Open: 3R (1982)

Erick Iskersky (born January 25, 1958) is a former professional tennis player from the United States and a three time All-American at Trinity University in Texas.

== Career ==
Iskersky was a three-time All-American for Trinity University (Texas). In 1979, he finished runner-up to Kevin Curren in the Division I NCAA Singles Championship by the scores of 6–2, 6–2, 6–3, and won the Doubles title with Ben McKown by scores of 6–2, 7–5, 6–3.

He competed in the main singles draw of a Grand Slam tournament four times and made the second round of the 1978 US Open, beating Ricardo Ycaza.

At the 1982 US Open, Iskersky and Jiří Granát made the round of 16 in the men's doubles.

- Iskersky won the Lorraine Open in France in 1982 and the 1983 IBM Open in Finland.
- He was inducted into the ITA Collegiate Hall of Fame in 2002,
- Won the 1978 and 1979 NCAA Indoor Singles title,
- Winner of the 1970 and 1976 Western Open,
- Winner of the 1972, 1974, and 1975 Western Closed,
- Member of the College All American Team in 1977, 1978, and 1979,
- Member of the 1976 and 1978 Junior Davis Cup Team
- Ohio State High School Champion in 1975 and 1976
- Ranked #3 in National Juniors in 1976
- Ranked #64 worldwide in March 1982
- In Junior competition defeated John McEnroe, Eliot Teltscher, and Robert Van't Hof
- As a professional he defeated Stefan Edberg, Peter McNamara, and Steve Denton

== Grand Prix career finals ==
=== Singles: 1 (1–0) ===
Result	W/L	Date	Tournament	Surface	Opponent	Score
Win	1–0	Mar 1982	Metz, France	Hard	(United States) Steve Denton	6–4, 6–3

=== Doubles: 1 (0–1) ===
Result	W/L	Date	Tournament	Surface	Partner	Opponents	Score
Loss	0–1	Oct 1983	Barcelona, Spain	Clay	(United States) Jim Gurfein	(Sweden) Anders Järryd (Sweden) Hans Simonsson	5–7, 3–6

== Challenger titles ==
=== Singles: (1) ===
No.	Year	Tournament	Surface	Opponent	Score
1.	1983	Helsinki, Finland	Hard	(Israel) Amos Mansdorf	6–4, 4–6, 7–5
