= Roberto Vizcaíno =

Spanish tennis player (1957–2016)

Roberto Vizcaíno Mallol
- Country (sports): (Spain)
- Born: 25 April 1957; Barcelona, Spain
- Died: 11 December 2016 (aged 59); Barcelona, Spain
- Height: 1.78 m (5 ft 10 in)
- Plays: Right-handed

Singles
- Career record: 20–34
- Career titles: 0
- Highest ranking: No. 157 (22 December 1980)

Grand Slam singles results
- French Open: 2R (1981)

Doubles
- Career record: 15–35
- Career titles: 0
- Highest ranking: No. 265 (18 March 1985)

Grand Slam doubles results
- French Open: 2R (1981)

Mixed doubles

Grand Slam mixed doubles results
- French Open: 2R (1980)

Roberto Vizcaíno Mallol (25 April 1957 – 11 December 2016) was a professional tennis player from Spain.

== Biography ==
Vizcaíno took part in the 1980 French Open and was beaten in the opening round by Yannick Noah. He also played in the mixed doubles, with Silvana Urroz. They made it into the second round, where they lost to Steve Krulevitz and Lucia Romanov.

Also in 1980, Vizcaino was a semi-finalist at the British Hard Court Championships in Bournemouth, securing wins over John Whiteford, Stefan Simonsson and Kjell Johansson.

Vizcaino defeated Antonio Zugarelli in the first round of the 1981 French Open, but was unable to get past Tony Giammalva in the second round. He competed in the men's doubles as well with Rick Fagel and the pair beat Argentinians Alejandro Ganzábal and Gustavo Guerrero, before a second round exit.

He made the quarter-finals at the 1983 Geneva Open and was a doubles semi-finalist in the 1984 Tel Aviv Open, with partner Ferrante Rocchi.

Until 1992 he was the coach of Carlos Costa.

Vizcaíno died in Barcelona on 11 December 2016 after an illness.
