= Lorenzo Fargas =

Spanish tennis player (born 1957)

- Full name: Lorenzo Fargas
- Country (sports): Spain
- Born: 19 October 1957 (age 69) Barcelona, Spain
- Height: 173 cm (5 ft 8 in)
- Plays: Right-handed

Singles
- Career record: 1–13
- Highest ranking: No. 201 (25 June 1984)

Doubles
- Career record: 11–16
- Highest ranking: No. 132 (2 January 1984)

Lorenzo Fargas (born 19 October 1957) is a former professional tennis player from Spain.

== Biography ==
Fargas, a right-handed player from Barcelona, made most of his Grand Prix appearances in his home tournament, the Torneo Godó. He appeared in the singles main draw at Barcelona on 11 occasions and was a doubles semi-finalist in 1984. As a doubles player he reached 132 in the world and won one Challenger title.

A former coach of Albert Costa, Fargas is now a youth coach at the Sanchez-Casal Tennis Academy. He has four children.

== Challenger titles ==
=== Doubles: (1) ===
Year	Tournament	Surface	Partner	Opponents	Score
1983	Vigo, Spain	Clay	(Spain) Gabriel Urpí	(Chile) Iván Camus (Ecuador) Raúl Viver	6–4, 4–6, 6–2
