= Fernando Soler (tennis) =

Spanish tennis player and sports agent

- Country (sports): Spain
- Born: 27 March 1961 (age 63); Barcelona, Spain
- Height: 6 ft 1 in (185 cm)
- Plays: Left-handed

Singles
- Career record: 3–6
- Highest ranking: No. 167 (12 Mar 1984)

Doubles
- Career record: 3–18
- Highest ranking: No. 242 (2 Jan 1984)

Fernando Soler (born 27 March 1961) is a Spanish sports agent and former professional tennis player. From 2006 to 2018 he was head of tennis for leading sports management company IMG.

In his playing days, Soler was a left-handed player and competed on tour throughout the 1980s, reaching a career high singles ranking of 167 in the world. His Grand Prix main draw appearances included a win over future French Open finalist Mikael Pernfors at the 1984 Washington Open.
