= Gabriel Urpí =

Spanish tennis player (born 1961)

- Country (sports): Spain
- Residence: Tarragona
- Born: 16 August 1961 (age 65) El Vendrell, Spain
- Height: 1.73 m (5 ft 8 in)
- Plays: Right-handed
- Prize money: $144,450

Singles
- Career record: 42–66
- Career titles: 0
- Highest ranking: No. 106 (18 May 1981)

Grand Slam singles results
- French Open: 3R (1982)
- Wimbledon: Q2 (1979)

Doubles
- Career record: 17–61
- Career titles: 0
- Highest ranking: No. 182 (3 Jan 1983)

Grand Slam doubles results
- French Open: 1R (1981, 1982, 1984)
- Wimbledon: Q1 (1979)

Gabriel Urpí Ribas (born 16 August 1961) is a former professional tennis player from Spain.

== Playing career ==
Urpi was the Orange Bowl champion in 1978 and a semi-finalist in the boys' singles event at the French Open that year.

A clay court specialist, he competed in the main draw of the French Open in 1981, 1982, 1984 and 1985. The Spaniard had his best performance at the 1982 French Open, where he reached the third round, with wins over Patrizio Parrini and Chris Lewis, the latter in a walkover.

He was a quarter-finalist at Madrid in 1979, Barcelona in 1980, Bordeaux in 1981 and Bari in 1984. His only semi-final appearance was at the 1987 Bordeaux Open. However, as a doubles player, he reached the Barcelona semi-finals in 1984, partnering Lorenzo Fargas. Two year earlier in Indianapolis, Urpi and doubles partner Rick Fagel had an upset win over Mark Edmondson and Kim Warwick, a pairing that were dual Australian Open winners.

== Coaching ==
Urpi had been the coach of Flavia Pennetta for several years, until her retirement. He was previously the coach of Arantxa Sanchez Vicario in 1994 and 1995, during which time she won two Grand Slam tournaments and also coached Conchita Martínez to the 1998 Australian Open final. In 2017, he worked as a coach of Elina Svitolina, having also formerly coached Nicolas Mahut. In 2021, Urpí coached Caroline Garcia.

== Challenger finals ==
=== Singles: (1-0) ===
Result	W-L	Date	Tournament	Surface	Opponent	Score
Win	1–0	January 1985	Agadir, Morocco	Clay	(Spain) David de Miguel	2–6, 6–4, 6–0

=== Doubles: (2-1) ===
Result	W-L	Date	Tournament	Surface	Partner	Opponents	Score
Loss	0–1	March 1980	San Luis Potosí, Mexico	Clay	(Bolivia) Ramiro Benavides	(United States) Mike Barr (Canada) Réjean Genois	4–6, 4–6
Win	1–1	April 1982	Parioli, Italy	Clay	(Chile) Iván Camus	(Argentina) Guillermo Aubone (Peru) Fernando Maynetto	3–6, 6–4, 6–3
Win	2–1	August 1983	Vigo, Spain	Clay	(Spain) Lorenzo Fargas	(Chile) Iván Camus (Ecuador) Raúl Viver	6–4, 4–6, 6–2
