= Grand Prix Super Series =

Details
- Duration: 1978–1989

Achievements (singles)
- Most titles: (United States) John McEnroe (30)
- Most finals: (Czechoslovakia) Ivan Lendl (44)

The Grand Prix Super Series of men's tennis tournaments was part of the Grand Prix and World Championship Tennis tours between 1978 and 1989, sometimes also referred to as the Super Grand Prix. They were held annually throughout the year in Europe, North America, Africa and Asia. These tournaments were the most prestigious and highest level events of the Grand Prix Tour after the majors and year-end championships.

When the Association of Tennis Professionals (ATP) became the sole governing body of men's tennis in 1990, all of the surviving tournaments of the Grand Prix were absorbed into the new ATP Tour. The nine top events existing at that time are now known as ATP Tour Masters 1000 tournaments.

== Tournament finals ==
=== 1978 Grand Prix – Super Series ===
The 1978 Grand Prix circuit was the ninth edition of the Grand Prix circuit and consisted of 84 tournaments which were held from January through December. The tournaments were graded in three main categories: 1) Grand Slam events 2) Super Series tournaments with prize money of at least $175,000 and 3) tournaments with prize money between $50,000 and $175,000. Both latter categories were subdivided in four prize money categories which determined the number of ranking points available. In addition the season-ending Masters tournament carried prize money of $400,000. There were 32 Super Series tournaments, including 8 WCT tournaments.

Tournament	Singles			Doubles		
Tournament	Winner	Runner-up	Score	Winner	Runner-up	Score
Birmingham WCT	(Sweden) Björn Borg	(United States) Dick Stockton	7–6, 7–5	(United States) Vitas Gerulaitis (United States) Sandy Mayer	(South Africa) Frew McMillan (United States) Dick Stockton	3–6, 6–1, 7–6
Philadelphia WCT	(United States) Jimmy Connors	(United States) Roscoe Tanner	6–2, 6–4, 6–3	(South Africa) Bob Hewitt (South Africa) Frew McMillan	(United States) Vitas Gerulaitis (United States) Sandy Mayer	6–3, 6–4
Richmond WCT	(United States) Vitas Gerulaitis	(Australia) John Newcombe	7–5, 6–3	(South Africa) Bob Hewitt (South Africa) Frew McMillan	(United States) Vitas Gerulaitis (United States) Sandy Mayer	6–3, 7–5
St. Louis WCT	(United States) Sandy Mayer	(United States) Eddie Dibbs	7–6, 6–4	(South Africa) Bob Hewitt (South Africa) Frew McMillan	(Poland) Wojciech Fibak (Netherlands) Tom Okker	6–3, 6–2
Palm Springs	(United States) Roscoe Tanner	(Mexico) Raúl Ramírez	6–1, 7–6	(South Africa) Raymond Moore (United States) Roscoe Tanner	(South Africa) Bob Hewitt (South Africa) Frew McMillan	6–4, 6–4
Memphis	(United States) Jimmy Connors	(United States) Tim Gullikson	7–6, 6–3	(Mexico) Raúl Ramírez (United States) Brian Gottfried	(Australia) Phil Dent (Australia) John Newcombe	3–6, 7–6, 6–2
Milan WCT	(Sweden) Björn Borg	(United States) Vitas Gerulaitis	6–3, 6–3	(Paraguay) Víctor Pecci (Poland) Wojciech Fibak	(Spain) José Higueras (Mexico) Raúl Ramírez	5–7, 7–6, 7–6
Rotterdam WCT	(United States) Jimmy Connors	(Mexico) Raúl Ramírez	7–5, 7–5	(Mexico) Raúl Ramírez (United States) Fred McNair	(United States) Bob Lutz (United States) Stan Smith	6–2, 6–3
Monte Carlo WCT	(Mexico) Raúl Ramírez	(Czechoslovakia) Tomáš Šmíd	6–3, 6–3, 6–4	(Czechoslovakia) Tomáš Šmíd (United States) Peter Fleming	(Chile) Jaime Fillol (Romania) Ilie Năstase	6–4, 7–5
Houston WCT	(United States) Brian Gottfried	(Romania) Ilie Năstase	3–6, 6–2, 6–1	(Netherlands) Tom Okker (Poland) Wojciech Fibak	(United States) Tom Leonard (United States) Mike Machette	7–5, 7–5
Las Vegas	(United States) Harold Solomon	(Italy) Corrado Barazzutti	6–1, 3–0 (retired)	(Chile) Álvaro Fillol (Chile) Jaime Fillol	(South Africa) Bob Hewitt (Mexico) Raúl Ramírez	6–3, 7–6
Hamburg	(Argentina) Guillermo Vilas	(Poland) Wojciech Fibak	6–2, 6–4, 6–2	(Poland) Wojciech Fibak (Netherlands) Tom Okker	(Spain) Antonio Muñoz (Paraguay) Víctor Pecci	6–2, 6–4
Rome	(Sweden) Björn Borg	(Italy) Adriano Panatta	1–6, 6–3, 6–1, 4–6, 6–3	(Paraguay) Víctor Pecci (Chile) Belus Prajoux	(Czechoslovakia) Jan Kodeš (Czechoslovakia) Tomáš Šmíd	6–7, 7–6, 6–1
Washington	(United States) Jimmy Connors	(United States) Eddie Dibbs	7–5, 7–5	(United States) Arthur Ashe (South Africa) Bob Hewitt	(United States) Fred McNair (Mexico) Raúl Ramírez	6–3, 6–3
Louisville	(United States) Harold Solomon	(Australia) John Alexander	6–2, 6–2	(Paraguay) Víctor Pecci (Poland) Wojciech Fibak	(United States) Victor Amaya (Australia) John James	6–4, 6–7, 6–4
North Conway	(United States) Eddie Dibbs	(Australia) John Alexander	6–4, 6–4	(United States) Van Winitsky (United Kingdom) Robin Drysdale	(United States) Mike Fishbach (South Africa) Bernard Mitton	4–6, 7–6, 6–3
Indianapolis	(United States) Jimmy Connors	(Spain) José Higueras	7–5, 6–1	(United States) Hank Pfister (United States) Gene Mayer	(United States) Jeff Borowiak (New Zealand) Chris Lewis	6–3, 6–1
Toronto	(United States) Eddie Dibbs	(Argentina) José Luis Clerc	6–7, 6–4, 6–1	(Poland) Wojciech Fibak (Netherlands) Tom Okker	(United Kingdom) Colin Dowdeswell (Switzerland) Heinz Günthardt	6–3, 7–6
Boston	(Spain) Manuel Orantes	(United States) Harold Solomon	6–4, 6–3	(Hungary) Balázs Taróczy (Paraguay) Víctor Pecci	(Switzerland) Heinz Günthardt (United States) Van Winitsky	6–3, 3–6, 6–1
Los Angeles	(United States) Arthur Ashe	(United States) Brian Gottfried	6–2, 6–4	(Australia) Phil Dent (Australia) John Alexander	(United States) Fred McNair (Mexico) Raúl Ramírez	6–3, 7–6
San Francisco	(United States) John McEnroe	(United States) Dick Stockton	2–6, 7–6, 6–2	(United States) Peter Fleming (United States) John McEnroe	(United States) Bob Lutz (United States) Stan Smith	5–7, 6–4, 6–4
Barcelona	(Hungary) Balázs Taróczy	(Romania) Ilie Năstase	1–6, 7–5, 4–6, 6–3	(Chile) Hans Gildemeister (Socialist Federal Republic of Yugoslavia) Željko Franulović	(France) Jean-Louis Haillet (France) Gilles Moretton	6–1, 6–4
Sydney	(United States) Jimmy Connors	(Australia) Geoff Masters	6–0, 6–0, 6–4	(Australia) Tony Roche (Australia) John Newcombe	(Australia) Mark Edmondson (Australia) John Marks	6–4, 6–3
Tokyo	(Sweden) Björn Borg	(United States) Brian Teacher	6–3, 6–4	(Australia) Ross Case (Australia) Geoff Masters	(United States) Pat DuPré (United States) Tom Gorman	6–3, 6–4
Stockholm	(United States) John McEnroe	(United States) Tim Gullikson	6–2, 6–2	(Netherlands) Tom Okker (Poland) Wojciech Fibak	(United States) Stan Smith (United States) Bob Lutz	6–3, 6–2
London	(United States) John McEnroe	(United States) Tim Gullikson	6–7, 6–4, 7–6, 6–2	(United States) Peter Fleming (United States) John McEnroe	(South Africa) Bob Hewitt (South Africa) Frew McMillan	7–6, 4–6, 6–4
Buenos Aires	(Argentina) José Luis Clerc	(Paraguay) Víctor Pecci	6–4, 6–4	(New Zealand) Chris Lewis (United States) Van Winitsky	(Argentina) José Luis Clerc (Chile) Belus Prajoux	6–4, 3–6, 6–0
Johannesburg	(United States) Tim Gullikson	(United States) Harold Solomon	2–6, 7–6, 7–6, 6–7, 6–4	(South Africa) Raymond Moore (United States) Peter Fleming	(South Africa) Bob Hewitt (South Africa) Frew McMillan	6–3, 7–6

=== 1979 Grand Prix – Super Series ===
The 1979 Grand Prix circuit was the tenth edition of the Grand Prix circuit and consisted of 91 tournaments which were held from January through December. The tournaments were graded in one of twelve categories which determined the number of ranking points available: Grand Slam events, comprising four Grand Slam tournaments, Grand Prix Masters, Super Series.

Tournament	Singles			Doubles		
Tournament	Winner	Runner-up	Score	Winner	Runner-up	Score
Birmingham WCT	(United States) Jimmy Connors	(United States) Eddie Dibbs	6–2, 3–6, 7–5	(United States) Stan Smith (United States) Dick Stockton	(Romania) Ilie Năstase (Netherlands) Tom Okker	6–2, 6–3
Philadelphia	(United States) Jimmy Connors	(United States) Arthur Ashe	6–3, 6–4, 6–1	(Poland) Wojciech Fibak (Netherlands) Tom Okker	(United States) Peter Fleming (United States) John McEnroe	6–4, 6–3
Richmond WCT	(Sweden) Bjorn Borg	(Argentina) Guillermo Vilas	6–3, 6–1	(United States) Brian Gottfried (United States) John McEnroe	(Romania) Ion Țiriac (Argentina) Guillermo Vilas	6–4, 6–3
Rancho Mirage	(United States) Roscoe Tanner	(United States) Brian Gottfried	6–4, 6–2	(United States) Gene Mayer (United States) Sandy Mayer	(South Africa) Cliff Drysdale (United States) Bruce Manson	6–4, 7–6
Memphis	(United States) Jimmy Connors	(United States) Arthur Ashe	6–4, 5–7, 6–3	(Netherlands) Tom Okker (Poland) Wojciech Fibak	(South Africa) Frew McMillan (United States) Dick Stockton	6–4, 6–4
New Orleans WCT	(United States) John McEnroe	(United States) Roscoe Tanner	6–4, 6–2	(United States) Peter Fleming (United States) John McEnroe	(United States) Bob Lutz (United States) Stan Smith	6–1, 6–3
Milan WCT	(United States) John McEnroe	(Australia) John Alexander	6–4, 6–3	(United States) Peter Fleming (United States) John McEnroe	(South Africa) José Luis Clerc (United States) Tomáš Šmíd	6–1, 6–3
Rotterdam WCT	(Sweden) Bjorn Borg	(United States) John McEnroe	6–4, 6–2	(United States) Peter Fleming (United States) John McEnroe	(Switzerland) Heinz Gunthardt (South Africa) Bernard Mitton	6–4, 6–4
Monte Carlo WCT	(Sweden) Björn Borg	(United States) Vitas Gerulaitis	6–2, 6–1, 6–3	(Romania) Ilie Năstase (Mexico) Raúl Ramírez	(Paraguay) Víctor Pecci (Hungary) Balázs Taróczy	6–3, 6–4
Houston WCT	(Spain) José Higueras	(United States) Gene Mayer	6–3, 2–6, 7–6	(United States) Gene Mayer (United States) Sherwood Stewart	(Australia) John Alexander (Australia) Geoff Masters	6–1, 5–7, 6–4
Las Vegas	(Sweden) Björn Borg	(United States) Jimmy Connors	6–3, 6–2	(United States) Marty Riessen (United States) Sherwood Stewart	(Italy) Adriano Panatta (Mexico) Raúl Ramírez	4–6, 6–4, 7–6
Hamburg	(Spain) José Higueras	(United States) Harold Solomon	3–6, 6–1, 6–4, 6–1	(Czechoslovakia) Jan Kodeš (Czechoslovakia) Tomáš Šmíd	(Australia) Mark Edmondson (Australia) John Marks	6–3, 6–1, 7–6
Rome	(United States) Vitas Gerulaitis	(Argentina) Guillermo Vilas	6–7, 7–6, 6–7, 6–4, 6–2	(United States) Peter Fleming (Czechoslovakia) Tomáš Šmíd	(Argentina) José Luis Clerc (Romania) Ilie Năstase	4–6, 6–1, 7–5
Washington	(Argentina) Guillermo Vilas	(Paraguay) Victor Pecci	7–6, 7–6	(United States) Marty Riessen (United States) Sherwood Stewart	(United States) Brian Gottfried (Mexico) Raúl Ramírez	2–6, 6–3, 6–4
Louisville	(Australia) John Alexander	(United States) Terry Moor	7–6, 6–7, 3–3 rtd.	(United States) Marty Riessen (United States) Sherwood Stewart	(India) Vijay Amritraj (Mexico) Raúl Ramírez	6–2, 1–6, 6–1
North Conway	(United States) Harold Solomon	(Spain) José Higueras	5–7, 6–4, 7–6	(Romania) Ion Țiriac (Argentina) Guillermo Vilas	(United States) John Sadri (United States) Tim Wilkison	6–4, 7–6
Indianapolis	(United States) Jimmy Connors	(Spain) Guillermo Vilas	6–1, 2–6, 6–4	(United States) Gene Mayer (United States) John McEnroe	(Czechoslovakia) Jan Kodeš (Czechoslovakia) Tomáš Šmíd	6–4, 7–6
Toronto	(Sweden) Björn Borg	(United States) John McEnroe	6–3, 6–3	(United States) Peter Fleming (United States) John McEnroe	(Switzerland) Heinz Günthardt (South Africa) Bob Hewitt	6–7, 7–6, 6–1
Boston	(Spain) José Higueras	(Chile) Hans Gildemeister	6–3, 6–1	(Australia) Syd Ball (Australia) Kim Warwick	(Switzerland) Heinz Günthardt (Czechoslovakia) Pavel Složil	Not played
Los Angeles	(United States) Peter Fleming	(United States) John McEnroe	6–4, 6–4	(United States) Marty Riessen (United States) Sherwood Stewart	(Switzerland) Wojciech Fibak (South Africa) Frew McMillan	6–4, 6–4
San Francisco	(United States) John McEnroe	(United States) Peter Fleming	4–6, 7–5, 6–2	(United States) Peter Fleming (United States) John McEnroe	(Switzerland) Wojciech Fibak (South Africa) Frew McMillan	6–1, 6–4
Barcelona	(Chile) Hans Gildemeister	(United States) Eddie Dibbs	6–4, 6–3, 6–1	(Italy) Paolo Bertolucci (Italy) Adriano Panatta	(Brazil) Carlos Kirmayr (Brazil) Cássio Motta	6–4, 6–3
Sydney	(United States) Vitas Gerulaitis	(Argentina) Guillermo Vilas	4–6, 6–3, 6–1, 7–6	(Australia) Rod Frawley (Paraguay) Francisco González	(India) Vijay Amritraj (United States) Pat Du Pré	w/o
Tokyo	(Sweden) Björn Borg	(United States) Jimmy Connors	6–2, 6–2	(United States) Marty Riessen (United States) Sherwood Stewart	(Australia) Mike Cahill (United States) Terry Moor	6–4, 7–6
Stockholm	(United States) John McEnroe	(United States) Gene Mayer	6–7, 6–3, 6–3	(United States) John McEnroe (United States) Peter Fleming	(Netherlands) Tom Okker (Poland) Wojciech Fibak	6–4, 6–4
London	(United States) John McEnroe	(United States) Harold Solomon	6–3, 6–4, 7–5	(United States) John McEnroe (United States) Peter Fleming	(Czech Republic) Tomáš Šmíd (United States) Stan Smith	6–3, 6–2
Buenos Aires	(Argentina) Guillermo Vilas	(Argentina) José Luis Clerc	6–1, 6–2, 6–2	(Czechoslovakia) Tomáš Šmíd (United States) Sherwood Stewart	(Brazil) Marcos Hocevar (Brazil) João Soares	6–1, 7–5
Johannesburg	(Rhodesia) Andrew Pattison	(Paraguay) Victor Pecci	6–3, 6–2, 6–3	(South Africa) Bob Hewitt (South Africa) Frew McMillan	(Switzerland) Heinz Günthardt (Australia) Paul McNamee	1–6, 6–1, 6–4

=== 1980 Grand Prix – Super Series ===
The 1980 Grand Prix circuit was the eleventh edition of the Grand Prix circuit and consisted of 83 tournaments which were held from January 80 through January 81. The tournaments were graded in one of twelve prize money categories which determined the number of ranking points available: Grand Slam events, comprising four Grand Slam tournaments, Grand Prix Masters, Super Series, Regular Series.

Tournament	Singles			Doubles		
Tournament	Winner	Runner-up	Score	Winner	Runner-up	Score
Philadelphia WCT	(United States) Jimmy Connors	(United States) John McEnroe	6–3, 2–6, 6–3, 3–6, 6–4	(United States) Peter Fleming (United States) John McEnroe	(United States) Brian Gottfried (Mexico) Raúl Ramírez	7–6, 4–6, 6–3
Monte Carlo	(Sweden) Björn Borg	(Argentina) Guillermo Vilas	6–1, 6–0, 6–2	(Italy) Paolo Bertolucci (Italy) Adriano Panatta	(United States) Vitas Gerulaitis (United States) John McEnroe	6–2, 5–7, 6–4
Las Vegas	(Sweden) Björn Borg	(United States) Harold Solomon	6–3, 6–1	(United States) Robert Lutz (United States) Stan Smith	(Poland) Wojciech Fibak (United States) Gene Mayer	6–2, 7–5
Hamburg	(United States) Harold Solomon	(Argentina) Guillermo Vilas	6–7, 6–2, 6–4, 2–6, 6–3	(Chile) Hans Gildemeister (Ecuador) Andrés Gómez	(West Germany) Reinhart Probst (West Germany) Max Wünschig	6–3, 6–4
Rome	(Argentina) Guillermo Vilas	(France) Yannick Noah	6–0, 6–4, 6–4	(Australia) Mark Edmondson (Australia) Kim Warwick	(Hungary) Balázs Taróczy (United States) Eliot Teltscher	7–6, 7–6
Toronto	(Czechoslovakia) Ivan Lendl	(Sweden) Björn Borg	4–6, 5–4 (retired)	(United States) Bruce Manson (United States) Brian Teacher	(Switzerland) Heinz Günthardt (United States) Sandy Mayer	6–3, 3–6, 6–4
Tokyo	(United States) Jimmy Connors	(United States) Tim Gullikson	6–1, 6–2	(United States) Victor Amaya (United States) Hank Pfister	(United States) Marty Riessen (United States) Sherwood Stewart	6–3, 3–6, 7–6
Stockholm	(Sweden) Björn Borg	(United States) John McEnroe	6–3, 6–4	(Switzerland) Heinz Günthardt (Australia) Paul McNamee	(United States) Stan Smith (United States) Bob Lutz (tennis)	6–7, 6–3, 6–2
London	(United States) John McEnroe	(United States) Gene Mayer	6–4, 6–4, 6–3	(United States) John McEnroe (United States) Peter Fleming	(United States) Bill Scanlon (United States) Eliot Teltscher	7–5, 6–3

=== 1981 Grand Prix – Super Series ===
The 1981 Grand Prix circuit was the twelfth edition of the Grand Prix circuit and consisted of 89 tournaments which were held from January 1981 through January 1982. The tournaments were graded in one of twelve categories which determined the number of ranking points available: Grand Slam events, comprising four Grand Slam tournaments, Grand Prix Masters, Super Series, Regular Series. The Super Series consisted of 28 tournaments with prize money of at least $175,000 (excluding Grand Slams).

Tournament	Singles			Doubles		
Tournament	Winner	Runner-up	Score	Winner	Runner-up	Score
Monterrey WCT	(South Africa) Johan Kriek	(United States) Vitas Gerulaitis	7–6, 3–6, 7–6	(South Africa) Kevin Curren (United States) Steve Denton	(South Africa) Johan Kriek (New Zealand) Russell Simpson	7–6, 6–3
Philadelphia	(United States) Roscoe Tanner	(Poland) Wojciech Fibak	6–2, 7–6, 7–5	(United States) Marty Riessen (United States) Sherwood Stewart	(United States) Brian Gottfried (Mexico) Raúl Ramírez	6–4, 6–4
Richmond WCT	(France) Yannick Noah	(Czechoslovakia) Ivan Lendl	6–1, 3–1 (retired)	(United States) Tim Gullikson (South Africa) Bernard Mitton	(United States) Brian Gottfried (Mexico) Raúl Ramírez	3–6, 6–2, 6–3
La Quinta	(United States) Jimmy Connors	(Czechoslovakia) Ivan Lendl	6–3, 7–6	(United States) Bruce Manson (United States) Brian Teacher	(United States) Terry Moor (United States) Eliot Teltscher	7–6, 6–2
Memphis	(United States) Gene Mayer	(United States) Roscoe Tanner	6–2, 6–4	(United States) Sandy Mayer (United States) Gene Mayer	(United States) Mike Cahill (United States) Tom Gullikson	7–6, 6–7, 7–6
Brussels WCT	(United States) Jimmy Connors	(United States) Brian Gottfried	6–2, 6–4, 6–3	(South Africa) Frew McMillan (United States) Sandy Mayer	(South Africa) Kevin Curren (United States) Steve Denton	4–6, 6–3, 6–3
Rotterdam WCT	(United States) Jimmy Connors	(United States) Gene Mayer	6–1, 2–6, 6–2	(United States) Fritz Buehning (United States) Ferdi Taygan	(United States) Gene Mayer (United States) Sandy Mayer	7–6, 1–6, 6–4
Milan WCT	(United States) John McEnroe	(Sweden) Björn Borg	7–6^{(7–2)}, 6–4	(Mexico) Raúl Ramírez (United States) Brian Gottfried	(United States) John McEnroe (United States) Peter Rennert	7–6, 6–3
Frankfurt WCT	(United States) John McEnroe	(Czech Republic) Tomáš Šmíd	6–2, 6–3	(United States) Brian Teacher (United States) Butch Walts	(United States) Vitas Gerulaitis (United States) John McEnroe	7–5, 6–7, 7–5
Houston WCT	(United States) Guillermo Vilas	(United States) Sammy Giammalva	6–2, 6–4	(Australia) Mark Edmondson (United States) Sherwood Stewart	(India) Anand Amritraj (United States) Fred McNair	6–4, 6–3
Monte Carlo	No Champion	(United States) Jimmy Connors (Argentina) Guillermo Vilas	5–5 (unfinished due to rain)	(Switzerland) Heinz Günthardt (Hungary) Balázs Taróczy	(Czechoslovakia) Pavel Složil (Czechoslovakia) Tomáš Šmíd	6–3, 6–3
Las Vegas	(Czech Republic) Ivan Lendl	(United States) Harold Solomon	6–4, 6–2	(United States) Peter Fleming (United States) John McEnroe	(United States) Tracy Delatte (United States) Trey Waltke	6–3, 7–6
Hamburg	(Australia) Peter McNamara	(United States) Jimmy Connors	7–6, 6–1, 4–6, 6–4	(Chile) Hans Gildemeister (Ecuador) Andrés Gómez	(Australia) Peter McNamara (Australia) Paul McNamee	6–4, 3–6, 6–4
Rome	(Argentina) José Luis Clerc	(Paraguay) Víctor Pecci	6–3, 6–4, 6–0	(Chile) Hans Gildemeister (Ecuador) Andrés Gómez	(United States) Bruce Manson (Czechoslovakia) Tomáš Šmíd	7–5, 6–2
Boston	(Argentina) José Luis Clerc	(Chile) Hans Gildemeister	0–6, 6–2, 6–2	(Czechoslovakia) Pavel Složil (Mexico) Raúl Ramírez	(Chile) Hans Gildemeister (Ecuador) Andrés Gómez	6–4, 7–6
Washington	(Argentina) José Luis Clerc	(Argentina) Guillermo Vilas	7–5, 6–2	(United States) Van Winitsky (Mexico) Raúl Ramírez	(Czechoslovakia) Pavel Složil (United States) Ferdi Taygan	5–7, 7–6, 7–6
North Conway	(Argentina) José Luis Clerc	(Argentina) Guillermo Vilas	6–3, 6–2	(Australia) Peter McNamara (Switzerland) Heinz Günthardt	(Czechoslovakia) Pavel Složil (United States) Ferdi Taygan	7–5, 6–4
Indianapolis	(Argentina) José Luis Clerc	(Czechoslovakia) Ivan Lendl	4–6, 6–4, 6–2	(United States) Steve Denton (South Africa) Kevin Curren	(Mexico) Raúl Ramírez (United States) Van Winitsky	6–3, 5–7, 7–5
Montreal	(Czechoslovakia) Ivan Lendl	(United States) Eliot Teltscher	6–3, 6–2	(Mexico) Raúl Ramírez (United States) Ferdi Taygan	(United States) Peter Fleming (United States) John McEnroe	2–6, 7–6, 6–4
Cincinnati	(United States) John McEnroe	(New Zealand) Chris Lewis	6–3, 6–4	(United States) John McEnroe (United States) Ferdi Taygan	(United States) Bob Lutz (United States) Stan Smith	7–6, 6–3
San Francisco	(United States) Eliot Teltscher	(United States) Brian Teacher	6–3, 7–6	(United States) John McEnroe (United States) Peter Fleming	(Australia) Mark Edmondson (United States) Sherwood Stewart	7–6, 6–4
Barcelona	(Czechoslovakia) Ivan Lendl	(Argentina) Guillermo Vilas	6–0, 6–3, 6–0	(Sweden) Anders Jarryd (Sweden) Hans Simonsson	(Chile) Hans Gildemeister (Ecuador) Andrés Gómez	6–1, 6–4
Sydney	(United States) John McEnroe	(United States) Roscoe Tanner	6–4, 7–5, 6–2	(United States) Peter Fleming (United States) John McEnroe	(United States) Sherwood Stewart (United States) Ferdi Taygan	6–7, 7–6, 6–1
Tokyo	(United States) Vincent Van Patten	(Australia) Mark Edmondson	6–2, 3–6, 6–3	(United States) Victor Amaya (United States) Hank Pfister	(Switzerland) Heinz Günthardt (Hungary) Balázs Taróczy	6–4, 6–2
Stockholm	(United States) Gene Mayer	(United States) Sandy Mayer	6–4, 6–2	(United States) Steve Denton (South Africa) Kevin Curren	(United States) Sherwood Stewart (United States) Ferdi Taygan	6–7, 6–4, 6–0
London	(United States) Jimmy Connors	(United States) John McEnroe	3–6, 2–6, 6–3, 6–4, 6–2	(United States) Ferdi Taygan (United States) Sherwood Stewart	(United States) John McEnroe (United States) Peter Fleming	7–5, 6–7, 6–4
Buenos Aires	(Czechoslovakia) Ivan Lendl	(Argentina) Guillermo Vilas	6–2, 6–2	(Brazil) João Soares (Brazil) Marcos Hocevar	(Chile) Jaime Fillol (Chile) Álvaro Fillol	7–6, 6–7, 6–4
Johannesburg	(United States) Vitas Gerulaitis	(United States) Jeff Borowiak	6–4, 7–6, 6–1	(South Africa) John Yuill (United States) Terry Moor	(United States) Fritz Buehning (Australia) Russell Simpson	6–3, 5–7, 6–4, 6–7, 12–10

=== 1982 Grand Prix – Super Series ===
The 1982 Grand Prix circuit was the thirteenth edition of the Grand Prix circuit and consisted of 70 tournaments which were held from January 82 through January 83. The tournaments were graded in one of twelve categories which determined the number of ranking points available: Grand Slam events, comprising four Grand Slam tournaments, Grand Prix Masters, Super Series, Regular Series. The Super Series consisted of 29 tournaments.

Tournament	Singles			Doubles		
Tournament	Winner	Runner-up	Score	Winner	Runner-up	Score
Philadelphia	(United States) John McEnroe	(United States) Jimmy Connors	6–3, 6–3, 6–1	(United States) Peter Fleming (United States) John McEnroe	(United States) Sherwood Stewart (United States) Ferdi Taygan	7–6, 6–4
Denver WCT	(United States) John Sadri	(Ecuador) Andrés Gómez	4–6, 6–1, 6–4	(South Africa) Kevin Curren (United States) Steve Denton	(Australia) Phil Dent (Australia) Kim Warwick	6–4, 6–4
Memphis	(South Africa) Johan Kriek	(United States) John McEnroe	6–3, 3–6, 6–4	(South Africa) Kevin Curren (United States) Steve Denton	(United States) Peter Fleming (United States) John McEnroe	7–6, 4–6, 6–2
La Quinta	(France) Yannick Noah	(Czechoslovakia) Ivan Lendl	6–3, 2–6, 7–5	(United States) Brian Gottfried (Mexico) Raúl Ramírez	(United Kingdom) John Lloyd (United States) Dick Stockton	6–4, 3–6, 6–2
Monterrey	(United States) Jimmy Connors	(South Africa) Johan Kriek	6–2, 3–6, 6–3	(United States) Hank Pfister (United States) Victor Amaya	(United States) Tracy Delatte (United States) Mel Purcell	6–3, 6–7, 6–3
Brussels	(United States) Vitas Gerulaitis	(Sweden) Mats Wilander	4–6, 7–6, 6–2	(United States) Sherwood Stewart (Czechoslovakia) Pavel Složil	(United States) Tracy Delatte (United States) Chris Dunk	6–4, 6–7, 7–5
Rotterdam	(Argentina) Guillermo Vilas	(United States) Jimmy Connors	0–6, 6–2, 6–4	(United States) Sherwood Stewart (Australia) Mark Edmondson	(United States) Fritz Buehning (South Africa) Kevin Curren	7–5, 6-2
Milan	(Argentina) Guillermo Vilas	(United States) Jimmy Connors	6–3, 6–3	(Australia) Peter McNamara (Switzerland) Heinz Günthardt	(Australia) Mark Edmondson (United States) Sherwood Stewart	7–6, 7–6
Frankfurt	(Czechoslovakia) Ivan Lendl	(Australia) Peter McNamara	6–2, 6–2	(Australia) Mark Edmondson (United States) Steve Denton	(United States) Tony Giammalva (United States) Tim Mayotte	6–7, 6–3, 6–3
Monte Carlo	(Argentina) Guillermo Vilas	(Czechoslovakia) Ivan Lendl	6–1, 7–6, 6–3	(Australia) Peter McNamara (Australia) Paul McNamee	(Australia) Mark Edmondson (United States) Sherwood Stewart	6–7, 7–6, 6–3
Los Angeles	(United States) Jimmy Connors	(United States) Mel Purcell	6–2, 6–1	(United States) Ferdi Taygan (United States) Sherwood Stewart	(United States) Bruce Manson (United States) Brian Teacher	6–1, 6–7, 6–3
Las Vegas	(United States) Jimmy Connors	(United States) Gene Mayer	5–2 (retired)	(United States) Ferdi Taygan (United States) Sherwood Stewart	(Brazil) Carlos Kirmayr (United States) Van Winitsky	7–6, 6–4
Madrid	(Argentina) Guillermo Vilas	(Czechoslovakia) Ivan Lendl	6–7, 4–6, 6–0, 6–3, 6–3	(Czechoslovakia) Tomáš Šmíd (Czechoslovakia) Pavel Složil	(Switzerland) Heinz Günthardt (Hungary) Balázs Taróczy	6–1, 3–6, 9–7
Hamburg	(Spain) José Higueras	(Australia) Peter McNamara	4–6, 6–7, 7–6, 6–3, 7–6	(Czechoslovakia) Pavel Složil (Czechoslovakia) Tomáš Šmíd	(Sweden) Anders Järryd (Sweden) Hans Simonsson	6–4, 6–3
Rome	(Ecuador) Andrés Gómez	(United States) Eliot Teltscher	6–2, 6–3, 6–2	(Switzerland) Heinz Günthardt (Hungary) Balázs Taróczy	(Poland) Wojciech Fibak (Australia) John Fitzgerald	6–4, 4–6, 6–3
Boston	(Argentina) Guillermo Vilas	(United States) Mel Purcell	6–4, 6–0	(United States) Craig Wittus (United States) Steve Meister	(South Africa) Freddie Sauer (South Africa) Schalk van der Merwe	6–2, 6–3
Washington, D.C.	(Czechoslovakia) Ivan Lendl	(United States) Jimmy Arias	6–3, 6–3	(United States) Van Winitsky (Mexico) Raúl Ramírez	(Chile) Hans Gildemeister (Ecuador) Andrés Gómez	7–5, 7–6
North Conway	(Czechoslovakia) Ivan Lendl	(Spain) José Higueras	6–3, 6–2	(United States) Ferdi Taygan (United States) Sherwood Stewart	(Peru) Pablo Arraya (United States) Eric Fromm	6–2, 7–6
Indianapolis	(Spain) José Higueras	(United States) Jimmy Arias	7–5, 5–7, 6–3	(United States) Ferdi Taygan (United States) Sherwood Stewart	(South Africa) Robbie Venter (United States) Blaine Willenborg	6–4, 7–5
Toronto	(United States) Vitas Gerulaitis	(Czechoslovakia) Ivan Lendl	4–6, 6–1, 6–3	(United States) Steve Denton (Australia) Mark Edmondson	(United States) Peter Fleming (United States) John McEnroe	6–7, 7–5, 6–2
Cincinnati	(Czechoslovakia) Ivan Lendl	(United States) Steve Denton	6–2, 7–6	(United States) Peter Fleming (United States) John McEnroe	(United States) Steve Denton (Australia) Mark Edmondson	6–2, 6–3
Sawgrass	N/A (Doubles event)			(United States) Brian Gottfried (Mexico) Raúl Ramírez	(Australia) Mark Edmondson (Australia) Kim Warwick	walkover
San Francisco	(United States) John McEnroe	(United States) Jimmy Connors	6–1, 6–3	(United States) Brian Teacher (United States) Fritz Buehning	(United States) Marty Davis (United States) Chris Dunk	6–7, 6–2, 7–5
Barcelona	(Sweden) Mats Wilander	(Argentina) Guillermo Vilas	6–3, 6–4, 6–3	(Sweden) Hans Simonsson (Sweden) Anders Järryd	(Brazil) Carlos Kirmayr (Brazil) Cássio Motta	6–3, 6–2
Sydney	(United States) John McEnroe	(United States) Gene Mayer	6–4, 6–1, 6–4	(United States) John McEnroe (United States) Peter Rennert	(United States) Steve Denton (Australia) Mark Edmondson	6–3, 7–6
Tokyo	(United States) John McEnroe	(Australia) Peter McNamara	7–6, 7–5	(United States) Tim Gullikson (United States) Tom Gullikson	(United States) John McEnroe (United States) Peter Rennert	6–4, 3–6, 7–6
Stockholm	(France) Henri Leconte	(Sweden) Mats Wilander	7–6, 6–3	(United States) Mark Dickson (Sweden) Jan Gunnarsson	(United States) Sherwood Stewart (United States) Ferdi Taygan	7–6, 6–7, 6–4
London	(United States) John McEnroe	(United States) Brian Gottfried	6–3, 6–2, 6–4	(United States) John McEnroe (United States) Peter Fleming	(Switzerland) Heinz Günthardt (Czech Republic) Tomáš Šmíd	7–6, 6–4
São Paulo	(Argentina) José Luis Clerc	(Brazil) Marcos Hocevar	6–2, 6–7, 6–3	(Brazil) Cássio Motta (Brazil) Carlos Kirmayr	(Australia) Peter McNamara (United States) Ferdi Taygan	6–3, 6–1
Johannesburg	(United States) Vitas Gerulaitis	(Argentina) Guillermo Vilas	7–6, 6–2, 4–6, 7–6	(United States) Brian Gottfried (South Africa) Frew McMillan	(Israel) Schlomo Glickstein (United States) Andrew Pattison	6–2, 6–2

=== 1983 Grand Prix – Super Series ===
The 1983 Grand Prix circuit was the fourteenth edition of the Grand Prix circuit and consisted of 70 tournaments which were held from January 83 through January 84. The tournaments were graded in one of twelve categories which determined the number of ranking points available: Grand Slam events, comprising four Grand Slam tournaments, Grand Prix Masters, Super Series, Regular Series.

Tournament	Singles			Doubles		
Tournament	Winner	Runner-up	Score	Winner	Runner-up	Score
Philadelphia	(United States) John McEnroe	(Czechoslovakia) Ivan Lendl	4–6, 7–6, 6–4, 6–3	(United States) Kevin Curren (United States) Steve Denton	(United States) Peter Fleming (United States) John McEnroe	4–6, 7–6, 7–6
Memphis	(United States) Jimmy Connors	(United States) Gene Mayer	7–5, 6–0	(Australia) Peter McNamara (Australia) Paul McNamee	(United States) Tim Gullikson (United States) Tom Gullikson	6–3, 5–7, 6–4
La Quinta	(Spain) José Higueras	(United States) Eliot Teltscher	6–4, 6–2	(United States) Brian Gottfried (Mexico) Raúl Ramírez	(South Africa) Tian Viljoen (South Africa) Danie Visser	6–3, 6–3
Monte Carlo	(Sweden) Mats Wilander	(United States) Mel Purcell	6–1, 6–2, 6–3	(Hungary) Balázs Taróczy (Switzerland) Heinz Günthardt	(France) Henri Leconte (France) Yannick Noah	6–2, 6–4
Forest Hills WCT	(United States) John McEnroe	(United States) Vitas Gerulaitis	6–3, 7–5	(United States) Tracy Delatte (United States) Johan Kriek	(South Africa) Kevin Curren (United States) Steve Denton	6–7, 7–5, 6–3
Hamburg	(France) Yannick Noah	(Spain) José Higueras	3–6, 7–5, 6–2, 6–0	(Switzerland) Heinz Günthardt (Hungary) Balázs Taróczy	(Australia) Mark Edmondson (United States) Brian Gottfried	6–1, 6–0
Rome	(United States) Jimmy Arias	(Spain) José Higueras	6–2, 6–7, 6–1, 6–4	(Paraguay) Francisco González (Paraguay) Víctor Pecci	(Sweden) Jan Gunnarsson (United States) Mike Leach	6–2, 6–7, 6–4
Montreal	(Czechoslovakia) Ivan Lendl	(Sweden) Anders Järryd	6–2, 6–2	(United States) Sandy Mayer (United States) Ferdi Taygan	(United States) Tim Gullikson (United States) Tom Gullikson	6–3, 6–4
Cincinnati	(Sweden) Mats Wilander	(United States) John McEnroe	6–4, 6–4	(United States) Victor Amaya (United States) Tim Gullikson	(Brazil) Carlos Kirmayr (Brazil) Cássio Motta	6–4, 6–3
Tokyo	(Czech Republic) Ivan Lendl	(United States) Scott Davis	3–6, 6–3, 6–4	(Australia) Mark Edmondson (United States) Sherwood Stewart	(United States) Steve Denton (Australia) John Fitzgerald	6–1, 6–4
London	(United States) John McEnroe	(United States) Jimmy Connors	7–5, 6–2, 6–1	(United States) John McEnroe (United States) Peter Fleming	(United States) Steve Denton (United States) Sherwood Stewart	6–3, 6–4

=== 1984 Grand Prix – Super Series ===
The 1984 Grand Prix circuit was the fifteenth edition of the Grand Prix circuit and consisted of 68 tournaments which were held from January 84 through January 85. The tournaments were graded in one of twelve categories which determined the number of ranking points available: Grand Slam events, comprising four Grand Slam tournaments, Grand Prix Masters, Super Series, Open Week Series and Regular Series.

Tournament	Singles			Doubles		
Tournament	Winner	Runner-up	Score	Winner	Runner-up	Score
Philadelphia	(United States) John McEnroe	(Czechoslovakia) Ivan Lendl	6–3, 3–6, 6–3, 7–6	(United States) Peter Fleming (United States) John McEnroe	(France) Henri Leconte (France) Yannick Noah	6–2, 6–3
La Quinta	(United States) Jimmy Connors	(France) Yannick Noah	6–2, 6–7, 6–3	(South Africa) Bernard Mitton (United States) Butch Walts	(United States) Scott Davis (United States) Ferdi Taygan	5–7, 6–3, 6–2
Madrid	(United States) John McEnroe	(Czechoslovakia) Tomáš Šmíd	6–0, 6–4	(United States) Peter Fleming (United States) John McEnroe	(United States) Fritz Buehning (United States) Ferdi Taygan	6–3, 6–3
Monte Carlo	(Sweden) Henrik Sundström	(Sweden) Mats Wilander	6–3, 7–5, 6–2	(Australia) Mark Edmondson (United States) Sherwood Stewart	(Sweden) Jan Gunnarsson (Sweden) Mats Wilander	6–2, 6–1
Forest Hills WCT	(United States) John McEnroe	(Czechoslovakia) Ivan Lendl	6–4, 6–2	(United States) David Dowlen (Nigeria) Nduka Odizor	(United States) Ernie Fernández (United States) David Pate	7–6, 7–5
Hamburg	(Spain) Juan Aguilera	(Sweden) Henrik Sundström	6–4, 2–6, 2–6, 6–4, 6–4	(Sweden) Stefan Edberg (Sweden) Anders Järryd	(Switzerland) Heinz Günthardt (Hungary) Balázs Taróczy	6–4, 6–3
Rome	(Ecuador) Andrés Gómez	(United States) Aaron Krickstein	2–6, 6–1, 6–2, 6–2	(United States) Ken Flach (United States) Robert Seguso	(Australia) John Alexander (United States) Mike Leach	3–6, 6–3, 6–4
Toronto	(United States) John McEnroe	(United States) Vitas Gerulaitis	6–0, 6–3	(United States) Peter Fleming (United States) John McEnroe	(Australia) John Fitzgerald (Australia) Kim Warwick	6–4, 6–2
Cincinnati	(Sweden) Mats Wilander	(Sweden) Anders Järryd	7–6, 6–3	(Paraguay) Francisco González (United States) Matt Mitchell	(United States) Sandy Mayer (Hungary) Balázs Taróczy	4–6, 6–3, 7–6
Tokyo	(United States) Jimmy Connors	(Czech Republic) Ivan Lendl	6–4, 3–6, 6–0	(United States) Tony Giammalva (United States) Sammy Giammalva	(Australia) Mark Edmondson (United States) Sherwood Stewart	7–6, 6–4
Stockholm	(United States) John McEnroe	(Sweden) Mats Wilander	6–2, 3–6, 6–2	(France) Henri Leconte (Czechoslovakia) Tomáš Šmíd	(India) Vijay Amritraj (Romania) Ilie Năstase	7–5, 7–5

=== 1985 Grand Prix – Super Series ===
The 1985 Grand Prix circuit was the sixteenth edition of the Grand Prix circuit and consisted of 71 tournaments which were held from January 85 through January 86. The tournaments were graded in one of twelve categories which determined the number of ranking points available: Grand Slam events, comprising four Grand Slam tournaments, Grand Prix Masters, Super Series, Open Week Series and Regular Series. There were 32 Super Series tournaments.

Tournament	Singles			Doubles		
Tournament	Winner	Runner-up	Score	Winner	Runner-up	Score
Philadelphia	(United States) John McEnroe	(Czechoslovakia) Miloslav Mečíř	6–3, 7–6, 6–1	(Sweden) Joakim Nyström (Sweden) Mats Wilander	(Poland) Wojciech Fibak (United States) Sandy Mayer	7–6, 7–6
Miami	(United States) Tim Mayotte	(United States) Scott Davis	4–6, 4–6, 6–3, 6–2, 6–4	(United States) Paul Annacone (South Africa) Christo van Rensburg	(United States) Sherwood Stewart (Australia) Kim Warwick	7–5, 7–5, 6–4
Monte Carlo	(Czechoslovakia) Ivan Lendl	(Sweden) Mats Wilander	6–1, 6–3, 4–6, 6–4	(Czechoslovakia) Pavel Složil (Czechoslovakia) Tomáš Šmíd	(Israel) Shlomo Glickstein (Israel) Shahar Perkiss	6–2, 6–3
Hamburg	(Czechoslovakia) Miloslav Mečíř	(Sweden) Henrik Sundström	6–4, 6–1, 6–4	(Chile) Hans Gildemeister (Ecuador) Andrés Gómez	(Switzerland) Heinz Günthardt (Hungary) Balázs Taróczy	6–4, 6–3
Forest Hills WCT	(Czechoslovakia) Ivan Lendl	(United States) John McEnroe	6–3, 6–3	(United States) Ken Flach (United States) Robert Seguso	(Brazil) Givaldo Barbosa (Brazil) Ivan Kley	7–5, 6–2
Rome	(France) Yannick Noah	(Czechoslovakia) Miloslav Mečíř	6–4, 3–6, 6–2, 7–6	(Sweden) Anders Järryd (Sweden) Mats Wilander	(United States) Ken Flach (United States) Robert Seguso	4–6, 6–3, 6–2
Montreal	(United States) John McEnroe	(Czechoslovakia) Ivan Lendl	7–5, 6–3	(United States) Ken Flach (United States) Robert Seguso	(Sweden) Stefan Edberg (Sweden) Anders Järryd	7–5, 7–6
Cincinnati	(West Germany) Boris Becker	(Sweden) Mats Wilander	6–4, 6–2	(Sweden) Stefan Edberg (Sweden) Anders Järryd	(Sweden) Joakim Nyström (Sweden) Mats Wilander	4–6, 6–2, 6–3
Los Angeles	(United States) Paul Annacone	(Sweden) Stefan Edberg	7–6^{(7–5)}, 6–7^{(8–10)}, 7–6^{(7–4)}	(United States) Scott Davis (United States) Robert Van't Hof	(United States) Paul Annacone (South Africa) Christo van Rensburg	6–3, 7–6
Tokyo	(Czech Republic) Ivan Lendl	(Sweden) Mats Wilander	6–0, 6–4	(United States) Ken Flach (United States) Robert Seguso	(United States) Scott Davis (United States) David Pate	4–6, 6–3, 7–6
Stockholm	(United States) John McEnroe	(Sweden) Anders Järryd	6–1, 6–2	(France) Guy Forget (Ecuador) Andrés Gómez	(United States) Mike De Palmer (United States) Gary Donnelly	6–3, 6–4

=== 1986 Grand Prix – Super Series ===
The 1986 Grand Prix circuit was the seventeenth edition of the Grand Prix circuit and consisted of 70 tournaments which were held from January through December. The tournaments were graded in one of twelve categories which determined the number of ranking points available: Grand Slam events, comprising four Grand Slam tournaments, Grand Prix Masters, Super Series, Open Week Series and Regular Series.

Tournament	Singles			Doubles		
Tournament	Winner	Runner-up	Score	Winner	Runner-up	Score
Philadelphia	(Czechoslovakia) Ivan Lendl	(United States) Tim Mayotte	walkover	(United States) Scott Davis (United States) David Pate	(Sweden) Stefan Edberg (Sweden) Anders Järryd	6–4, 6–7, 6–3
Miami	(Czechoslovakia) Ivan Lendl	(Sweden) Mats Wilander	3–6, 6–1, 7–6, 6–4	(United States) Brad Gilbert (United States) Vince Van Patten	(Sweden) Stefan Edberg (Sweden) Anders Järryd	walkover
Monte Carlo	(Sweden) Joakim Nyström	(France) Yannick Noah	6–3, 6–2	(France) Guy Forget (France) Yannick Noah	(Sweden) Joakim Nyström (Sweden) Mats Wilander	6–4, 3–6, 6–4
Rome	(Czechoslovakia) Ivan Lendl	(Spain) Emilio Sánchez	7–5, 4–6, 6–1, 6–1	(France) Guy Forget (France) Yannick Noah	(Australia) Mark Edmondson (United States) Sherwood Stewart	7–6, 6–2
Toronto	(West Germany) Boris Becker	(Sweden) Stefan Edberg	6–4, 3–6, 6–3	(United States) Chip Hooper (United States) Mike Leach	(West Germany) Boris Becker (Socialist Federal Republic of Yugoslavia) Slobodan Živojinović	6–7, 6–3, 6–3
Cincinnati	(Sweden) Mats Wilander	(United States) Jimmy Connors	6–4, 6–1	(Australia) Mark Kratzmann (Australia) Kim Warwick	(South Africa) Christo Steyn (South Africa) Danie Visser	6–3, 6–4.
Hamburg	(France) Henri Leconte	(Czechoslovakia) Miloslav Mečíř	6–2, 5–7, 6–4, 6–2	(Spain) Emilio Sánchez (Spain) Sergio Casal	(Germany) Boris Becker (Germany) Eric Jelen	6–1, 7–5
Tokyo	(Germany) Boris Becker	(Sweden) Stefan Edberg	7–6, 6–1	(United States) Gary Donnelly (United States) Mike De Palmer	(Ecuador) Andrés Gómez (Czech Republic) Ivan Lendl	6–3, 7–5
Stockholm	(Sweden) Stefan Edberg	(Sweden) Mats Wilander	6–2, 6–1, 6–1	(United States) Sherwood Stewart (Australia) Kim Warwick	(Australia) Pat Cash (Socialist Federal Republic of Yugoslavia) Slobodan Živojinović	4–6, 6–1, 7–5

=== 1987 Grand Prix – Super Series ===
The 1987 Grand Prix circuit was the eighteenth edition of the Grand Prix circuit and consisted of 77 tournaments which were held from December 87 through December 88. The tournaments were graded in one of twelve categories which determined the number of ranking points available: Grand Slam events, comprising four Grand Slam tournaments, Grand Prix Masters, Super Series, Open Week Series and Regular Series.

Tournament	Singles			Doubles		
Tournament	Winner	Runner-up	Score	Winner	Runner-up	Score
Indian Wells	(West Germany) Boris Becker	(Sweden) Stefan Edberg	6–4, 6–4, 7–5	(France) Guy Forget (France) Yannick Noah	(West Germany) Boris Becker (West Germany) Eric Jelen	5–7, 7–6, 7–5
Miami	(Czechoslovakia) Miloslav Mečíř	(Czechoslovakia) Ivan Lendl	7–5, 6–2, 7–5	(United States) Paul Annacone (South Africa) Christo van Rensburg	(United States) Ken Flach (United States) Robert Seguso	6–2, 6–4, 6–4
Monte Carlo	(Sweden) Mats Wilander	(United States) Jimmy Arias	4–6, 7–5, 6–1, 6–3	(Chile) Hans Gildemeister (Ecuador) Andrés Gómez	(Iran) Mansour Bahrami (Denmark) Michael Mortensen	6–2, 6–4
Hamburg	(Czechoslovakia) Ivan Lendl	(Czechoslovakia) Miloslav Mečíř	6–1, 6–3, 6–3	(Czechoslovakia) Miloslav Mečíř (Czechoslovakia) Tomáš Šmíd	(Switzerland) Claudio Mezzadri (United States) Jim Pugh	6–1, 6–2
Rome	(Sweden) Mats Wilander	(Argentina) Martín Jaite	6–3, 6–4, 6–4	(France) Guy Forget (France) Yannick Noah	(Czechoslovakia) Miloslav Mečíř (Czechoslovakia) Tomáš Šmíd	6–2, 6–7, 6–3
Montreal	(Czechoslovakia) Ivan Lendl	(Sweden) Stefan Edberg	6–4, 7–6	(Australia) Pat Cash (Sweden) Stefan Edberg	(Australia) Peter Doohan (Australia) Laurie Warder	6–7, 6–3, 6–4
Cincinnati	(Sweden) Stefan Edberg	(Germany) Boris Becker	6–4, 6–1	(United States) Ken Flach (United States) Robert Seguso	(Australia) John Fitzgerald (United States) Steve Denton	7–5, 6–3
Tokyo	(Sweden) Stefan Edberg	(Czech Republic) Ivan Lendl	6–7, 6–4, 6–4	(Australia) Broderick Dyke (Netherlands) Tom Nijssen	(United States) Sammy Giammalva (United States) Jim Grabb	6–3, 6–2
Stockholm	(Sweden) Stefan Edberg	(Sweden) Jonas Svensson	7–5, 6–2, 4–6, 6–4	(Sweden) Stefan Edberg (Sweden) Anders Järryd	(United States) Jim Grabb (United States) Jim Pugh	6–2, 3–6, 6–1

=== 1988 Grand Prix – Super Series ===
The 1988 Grand Prix circuit was the nineteenth edition of the Grand Prix circuit and consisted of 77 tournaments which were held from January through December. The tournaments were graded in one of six categories which determined the number of ranking points available: Grand Slam events, comprising four Grand Slam tournaments, Olympic Games, Grand Prix Masters, Super Series, Open Week Series and Regular Series.

Tournament	Singles			Doubles		
Tournament	Winner	Runner-up	Score	Winner	Runner-up	Score
Rotterdam	(Sweden) Stefan Edberg	(Czechoslovakia) Miloslav Mečíř	7–6, 6–2	(West Germany) Patrik Kühnen (West Germany) Tore Meinecke	(Sweden) Magnus Gustafsson (Italy) Diego Nargiso	7–6, 7–6
Milan	(France) Yannick Noah	(United States) Jimmy Connors	4–4 (retired)	(West Germany) Boris Becker (West Germany) Eric Jelen	(Czechoslovakia) Miloslav Mečíř (Czechoslovakia) Tim Wilkison	6–3, 6–3
Memphis	(United States) Andre Agassi	(Sweden) Mikael Pernfors	6–4, 6–4, 7–5	(United States) Kevin Curren (United States) David Pate	(Sweden) Peter Lundgren (Sweden) Mikael Pernfors	6–3, 7–5
Philadelphia	(United States) Tim Mayotte	(United States) John Fitzgerald	4–6, 6–2, 6–2, 6–3	(New Zealand) Kelly Evernden (United States) Johan Kriek	(United States) Kevin Curren (South Africa) Danie Visser	6–4, 6–3
Indian Wells	(West Germany) Boris Becker	(Spain) Emilio Sánchez	7–5, 6–4, 2–6, 6–4	(West Germany) Boris Becker (France) Guy Forget	(Mexico) Jorge Lozano (United States) Todd Witsken	6–3, 6–3
Miami	(Sweden) Mats Wilander	(United States) Jimmy Connors	6–4, 4–6, 6–4, 6–4	(Australia) John Fitzgerald (Sweden) Anders Järryd	(United States) Ken Flach (United States) Robert Seguso	7–6, 6–1, 7–5
Monte Carlo	(Czech Republic) Ivan Lendl	(Argentina) Martín Jaite	5–7, 6–4, 7–5, 6–3	(Spain) Sergio Casal (Spain) Emilio Sánchez	(France) Henri Leconte (Czechoslovakia) Ivan Lendl	6–7, 6–4, 7–6
Hamburg	(Sweden) Kent Carlsson	(France) Henri Leconte	6–2, 6–1, 6–4	(Australia) Darren Cahill (Australia) Laurie Warder	(United States) Rick Leach (United States) Jim Pugh	6–0, 5–7, 6–4
Rome	(Czech Republic) Ivan Lendl	(Argentina) Guillermo Pérez Roldán	2–6, 6–4, 6–2, 4–6, 6–4	(Mexico) Jorge Lozano (United States) Todd Witsken	(Sweden) Anders Järryd (Czechoslovakia) Tomáš Šmíd	6–3, 6–3
Toronto	(Czechoslovakia) Ivan Lendl	(United States) Kevin Curren	7–6, 6–2	(United States) Ken Flach (United States) Robert Seguso	(United Kingdom) Andrew Castle (United States) Tim Wilkison	7–6^{(7–3)}, 6–3
Cincinnati	(Sweden) Mats Wilander	(Sweden) Stefan Edberg	3–6, 7–6, 7–6	(United States) Rick Leach (United States) Jim Pugh	(United States) Jim Grabb (United States) Patrick McEnroe	6–2, 6–4
Tokyo	(Germany) Boris Becker	(Australia) John Fitzgerald	7–6, 6–4	(Ecuador) Andrés Gómez (Socialist Federal Republic of Yugoslavia) Slobodan Živojinović	(Germany) Boris Becker (Germany) Eric Jelen	7–5, 5–7, 6–3
Stockholm	(West Germany) Boris Becker	(Sweden) Peter Lundgren	6–4, 6–1, 6–1	(United States) Kevin Curren (United States) Jim Grabb	(United States) Paul Annacone (Australia) John Fitzgerald	7–5, 7–5

=== 1989 Grand Prix – Super Series ===
The 1989 Grand Prix circuit was the nineteenth and final edition of the Grand Prix circuit and consisted of 73 tournaments which were held from January through December. The tournaments were graded in one of five categories which determined the number of ranking points available: Grand Slam events, comprising four Grand Slam tournaments, Grand Prix Masters, Super Series, Open Week Series and Regular Series. There were 30 Super Series tournaments.

Tournament	Singles			Doubles		
Tournament	Winner	Runner-up	Score	Winner	Runner-up	Score
Rotterdam	(Switzerland) Jakob Hlasek	(Sweden) Anders Järryd	6–1, 7–5	(Czechoslovakia) Miloslav Mečíř (Czechoslovakia) Milan Šrejber	(Sweden) Jan Gunnarsson (Sweden) Magnus Gustafsson	7–6, 6–0
Memphis	(United States) Brad Gilbert	(United States) Johan Kriek	6–2, 6–2 (retired)	(United States) Paul Annacone (South Africa) Christo van Rensburg	(United States) Scott Davis (United States) Tim Wilkison	6–4, 6–2
Milan	(West Germany) Boris Becker	(Soviet Union) Alexander Volkov	6–1, 6–2	(Switzerland) Jakob Hlasek (United States) John McEnroe	(Switzerland) Heinz Günthardt (Hungary) Balázs Taróczy	6–3, 6–4
Philadelphia	(West Germany) Boris Becker	(United States) Tim Mayotte	7–6, 6–1, 6–3	(United States) Paul Annacone (South Africa) Christo van Rensburg	(United States) Rick Leach (United States) Jim Pugh	6–3, 7–5
Scottsdale	(Czechoslovakia) Ivan Lendl	(Sweden) Stefan Edberg	6–2 6–3	(United States) Rick Leach (United States) Jim Pugh	(United States) Paul Annacone (South Africa) Christo van Rensburg	6–7, 6–3, 6–2, 2–6, 6–4
Indian Wells	(Czech Republic) Miloslav Mečíř	(France) Yannick Noah	3–6, 2–6, 6–1, 6–2, 6–3	(Germany) Boris Becker (Switzerland) Jakob Hlasek	(United States) Kevin Curren (United States) David Pate	3–6, 6–3, 6–4
Miami	(Czech Republic) Ivan Lendl	(Austria) Thomas Muster	walkover	(Switzerland) Jakob Hlasek (Sweden) Anders Järryd	(United States) Jim Grabb (United States) Patrick McEnroe	6–3, (retired)
Tokyo	(Sweden) Stefan Edberg	(Czechoslovakia) Ivan Lendl	6–3, 2–6, 6–4	(United States) Ken Flach (United States) Robert Seguso	(United States) Kevin Curren (United States) David Pate	2–6, 6–4, 6–4
Monte Carlo	(Argentina) Alberto Mancini	(Germany) Boris Becker	7–5, 2–6, 7–5, 7–6	(Czech Republic) Tomáš Šmíd (Australia) Mark Woodforde	(Italy) Paolo Canè (Italy) Diego Nargiso	1–6, 6–4, 6–2
New York	(Czechoslovakia) Ivan Lendl	(Peru) Jaime Yzaga	6–2, 6–1	(United States) Rick Leach (United States) Jim Pugh	(United States) Jim Courier (United States) Pete Sampras	6–4, 6–2
Hamburg	(Czechoslovakia) Ivan Lendl	(Austria) Horst Skoff	6–4, 6–1, 6–3	(Spain) Emilio Sánchez (Spain) Javier Sánchez	(West Germany) Boris Becker (West Germany) Eric Jelen	6–4, 6–7, 7–6
Rome	(Argentina) Alberto Mancini	(United States) Andre Agassi	6–3, 4–6, 2–6, 7–6, 6–1	(United States) Jim Courier (United States) Pete Sampras	(Brazil) Danilo Marcelino (Brazil) Mauro Menezes	6–4, 6–3
Boston	(Ecuador) Andrés Gómez	(Sweden) Mats Wilander	6–1, 6–4	(Ecuador) Andrés Gómez (Argentina) Alberto Mancini	(United States) Todd Nelson (United States) Phillip Williamson	3–6, 6–3, 6–4
Washington, D.C.	(United States) Tim Mayotte	(United States) Brad Gilbert	3–6, 6–4, 7–5	(South Africa) Neil Broad (South Africa) Gary Muller	(United States) Jim Grabb (United States) Patrick McEnroe	6–7, 7–6, 6–4
Stratton Mountain	(United States) Brad Gilbert	(United States) Jim Pugh	7–5, 6–0	(Australia) Mark Kratzmann (Australia) Wally Masur	(South Africa) Pieter Aldrich (South Africa) Danie Visser	6–3, 4–6, 7–6
Indianapolis	(United States) John McEnroe	(United States) Jay Berger	6–4, 4–6, 6–4	(South Africa) Pieter Aldrich (South Africa) Danie Visser	(Australia) Peter Doohan (Australia) Laurie Warder	7–5, 7–6
Montreal	(Czech Republic) Ivan Lendl	(United States) John McEnroe	6–1, 6–3	(Australia) Kelly Evernden (United States) Todd Witsken	(United States) Charles Beckman (United States) Shelby Cannon	6–3, 6–3
Cincinnati	(United States) Brad Gilbert	(Sweden) Stefan Edberg	6–4, 2–6, 7–6	(United States) Ken Flach (United States) Robert Seguso	(South Africa) Pieter Aldrich (South Africa) Danie Visser	6–4, 6–4
Barcelona	(Ecuador) Andrés Gómez	(Austria) Horst Skoff	6–4, 2–6, 7–6	(Argentina) Gustavo Luza (Argentina) Christian Miniussi	(Spain) Sergio Casal (Czechoslovakia) Tomáš Šmíd	7–6, 5–7, 6–3
Los Angeles	(United States) Aaron Krickstein	(United States) Michael Chang	2–6, 6–4, 6–2	(United States) Marty Davis (United States) Tim Pawsat	(Australia) John Fitzgerald (Sweden) Anders Järryd	7–5, 7–6
San Francisco	(United States) Brad Gilbert	(Sweden) Anders Järryd	7–5, 6–2	(South Africa) Pieter Aldrich (South Africa) Danie Visser	(United States) Paul Annacone (South Africa) Christo van Rensburg	6–4, 6–3
Orlando	(United States) Andre Agassi	(United States) Brad Gilbert	6–2, 6–1	(United States) Scott Davis (United States) Tim Pawsat	(United States) Ken Flach (United States) Robert Seguso	7–5, 5–7, 6–4
Sydney	(Czechoslovakia) Ivan Lendl	(Sweden) Lars-Anders Wahlgren	6–2, 6–2, 6–1	(United States) David Pate (United States) Scott Warner	(Australia) Darren Cahill (Australia) Mark Kratzmann	6–3, 6–7, 7–5
Tokyo	(United States) Aaron Krickstein	(West Germany) Carl-Uwe Steeb	6–2, 6–2	(United States) Kevin Curren (United States) David Pate	(Ecuador) Andrés Gómez (Socialist Federal Republic of Yugoslavia) Slobodan Živojinović	4–6, 6–3, 7–6
Paris	(Germany) Boris Becker	(Sweden) Stefan Edberg	6–4, 6–3, 6–3	(Australia) John Fitzgerald (Sweden) Anders Järryd	(Switzerland) Jakob Hlasek (France) Éric Winogradsky	7–6, 6–4
Stockholm	(Czech Republic) Ivan Lendl	(Sweden) Magnus Gustafsson	7–5, 6–0, 6–3	(Mexico) Jorge Lozano (United States) Todd Witsken	(United States) Rick Leach (United States) Jim Pugh	6–3, 5–7, 6–3
London	(United States) Michael Chang	(France) Guy Forget	6–2, 6–1, 6–1	(Switzerland) Jakob Hlasek (United States) John McEnroe	(United Kingdom) Jeremy Bates (United States) Kevin Curren	6–1, 7–6
Johannesburg	(South Africa) Christo van Rensburg	(United States) Paul Chamberlin	6–4, 7–6, 6–3	(United States) Luke Jensen (United States) Richey Reneberg	(United States) Kelly Jones (United States) Joey Rive	6–0, 6–4

== Records ==
=== Most titles (singles) ===
Players with three or more titles, counted from the season tables above.

Rank	Player	Titles	Runner-up	Finals
1	(United States) John McEnroe	30	10	40
2	(Czechoslovakia) Ivan Lendl	29	15	44
3	(United States) Jimmy Connors	21	11	32
4	(Sweden) Björn Borg	13	2	15
5	(Argentina) Guillermo Vilas	10	12	22
5	(West Germany) Boris Becker	10	2	12
7	(Sweden) Mats Wilander	9	10	19
8	(United States) Vitas Gerulaitis	7	5	12
9	(Sweden) Stefan Edberg	6	9	15
9	(Spain) José Higueras	6	5	11
9	(Argentina) José Luis Clerc	6	2	8
12	(France) Yannick Noah	5	4	9
13	(United States) Harold Solomon	4	6	10
13	(United States) Brad Gilbert	4	2	6
13	(Ecuador) Andrés Gómez	4	1	5
16	(Czechoslovakia) Miloslav Mečíř	3	5	8
16	(United States) Roscoe Tanner	3	4	7
16	(United States) Tim Mayotte	3	2	5

== See also ==
- ATP Tour Masters 1000
- Grand Prix Circuit
- World Championship Tennis
- WCT Tournament of Champions
- ATP Tour
- History of tennis

== Sources ==
- Barrett, John. Tingay, Lance. The World of Tennis Year Book Annuals 1969 to 2001. Queen Anne Press. London, England.
