= 1978 Transamerica Open – Doubles =

Doubles
- 1978 Transamerica Open

Final
- Champion: (United States) Peter Fleming (United States) John McEnroe
- Runner-up: (United States) Bob Lutz (United States) Stan Smith
- Score: 5–7, 6–4, 6–4

Details
- Draw: 32
- Seeds: 8

Events
| Singles | Doubles |
| ← 1977 · | Pacific Coast Championships | · 1979 → |

The 1978 Transamerica Open – Doubles was an event of the 1978 Transamerica Open tennis tournament and was played on indoor carpet courts at the Cow Palace in San Francisco, California in the United States, between September 25, and October 2, 1978. The draw comprised 32 teams and eight of them were seeded. Dick Stockton and Marty Riessen were the defending Pacific Coast Championships doubles champions but did not compete together in this edition. The fifth-seeded team of Peter Fleming and John McEnroe won the doubles title after they defeated second-seeded Bob Lutz in the final, 5–7, 6–4, 6–4.

== Seeds ==
1. (South Africa) Bob Hewitt / (South Africa) Frew McMillan (first round)
2. (United States) Bob Lutz / (United States) Stan Smith (final)
3. (United States) Vitas Gerulaitis / (United States) Sandy Mayer (second round, withdrew)
4. (United States) Marty Riessen / (United States) Sherwood Stewart (quarterfinals)
5. (United States) Peter Fleming / (United States) John McEnroe (champions)
6. (United States) Gene Mayer / (United States) Hank Pfister (semifinals)
7. (United States) Dick Stockton / (United States) Erik van Dillen (second round)
8. (South Africa) Raymond Moore / (United States) Roscoe Tanner (second round)

== Draw ==
=== Key ===
- Q = Qualifier
- WC = Wild card
- LL = Lucky loser
- Alt = Alternate
- ITF = ITF entry
- PR = Protected ranking
- SR = Special ranking
- SE = Special exempt
- JE = Junior exempt
- JR = Junior Accelerator Programme entrant
- CO = College Accelerator Programme entrant
- NG = Next Gen Accelerator Program entrant
- w/o = Walkover
- r = Retired
- d = Defaulted

=== Finals ===
Semifinals
(United States) Tim Gullikson (United States) Tom Gullikson | 3 | 4
5 | (United States) Peter Fleming (United States) John McEnroe | 6 | 6
6 | (United States) Gene Mayer (United States) Hank Pfister | 4 | 4
2 | (United States) Bob Lutz (United States) Stan Smith | 6 | 6

Final
5 | (United States) Peter Fleming (United States) John McEnroe | 5 | 6 | 6
2 | (United States) Bob Lutz (United States) Stan Smith | 7 | 4 | 4

=== Top half ===
First Round
1 | (South Africa) Bob Hewitt (South Africa) Frew McMillan | 3 | 4
(United States) Tim Gullikson (United States) Tom Gullikson | 6 | 6
(Sweden) Jan Norbäck (Sweden) Douglas Palm | 7 | 5 | 3
(United States) Andy Lucchesi (United States) George Taylor | 6 | 7 | 6
(United States) Tony Graham (United States) Trey Waltke | 4 | 7 | 3
(Australia) Cliff Letcher (United States) Brad Rowe | 6 | 5 | 6
(United States) Nial Brash (United States) Cary Stansbury | 1 | 2
7 | (United States) Dick Stockton (United States) Erik van Dillen | 6 | 6
3 | (United States) Vitas Gerulaitis (United States) Sandy Mayer | 6 | 7
(United States) Martin Davis (United States) Chris Dunk | 4 | 6
(Australia) Colin Dibley (United States) Brian Teacher | 4 | 7 | 6
(United States) Bruce Manson (Zimbabwe) Andrew Pattison | 6 | 5 | 7
(United States) Mike Cahill (United States) Terry Moor | 3 | 1
(Australia) Ross Case (Australia) Geoff Masters | 6 | 6
(United States) Johan Kriek (South Africa) Willem Prinsloo | 5 | 4
5 | (United States) Peter Fleming (United States) John McEnroe | 7 | 6

Second Round
(United States) Tim Gullikson (United States) Tom Gullikson | 7 | 6
(United States) Andy Lucchesi (United States) George Taylor | 6 | 3
(Australia) Cliff Letcher (United States) Brad Rowe | 6 | 2 | 7
7 | (United States) Dick Stockton (United States) Erik van Dillen | 4 | 6 | 6
3 | (United States) Vitas Gerulaitis (United States) Sandy Mayer
(United States) Bruce Manson (Zimbabwe) Andrew Pattison | w/o
(Australia) Ross Case (Australia) Geoff Masters | 3 | 6 | 6
5 | (United States) Peter Fleming (United States) John McEnroe | 6 | 3 | 7

Quarterfinals
(United States) Tim Gullikson (United States) Tom Gullikson | 1 | 6 | 6
(Australia) Cliff Letcher (United States) Brad Rowe | 6 | 3 | 4
(United States) Bruce Manson (Zimbabwe) Andrew Pattison | 1 | 3
5 | (United States) Peter Fleming (United States) John McEnroe | 6 | 6

Semifinals
(United States) Tim Gullikson (United States) Tom Gullikson | 3 | 4
5 | (United States) Peter Fleming (United States) John McEnroe | 6 | 6

=== Bottom half ===
First Round
6 | (United States) Gene Mayer (United States) Hank Pfister | 4 | 6 | 7
(United States) John Austin (United States) Nick Saviano | 6 | 3 | 5
(Sweden) Ove Bengtson (United States) Pat DuPré | 6 | 7 | 3
(Italy) Adriano Panatta (Australia) Kim Warwick | 7 | 6 | 6
(United States) Jeff Borowiak (United States) Eliot Teltscher | 6 | 3 | 3
(United States) Matt Mitchell (United States) Peter Rennert | 4 | 6 | 6
(United States) Glen Holroyd (United States) Howard Schoenfield
4 | (United States) Marty Riessen (United States) Sherwood Stewart | w/o
8 | (South Africa) Raymond Moore (United States) Roscoe Tanner | 6 | 5 | 6
(United States) Mike MacHette (United States) Dennis Ralston | 4 | 7 | 4
(United States) Bill Maze (United States) Butch Walts | 6 | 6
(United States) David Couch (United States) Don Paulsen | 4 | 4
(United States) Mike Fishbach (South Africa) Bernard Mitton | 6 | 6
(United States) Bruce Nichols (United States) David Schneider | 3 | 4
(United States) Lloyd Bourne (United States) Chico Hagey | 1 | 6
2 | (United States) Bob Lutz (United States) Stan Smith | 6 | 7

Second Round
6 | (United States) Gene Mayer (United States) Hank Pfister | 6 | 4 | 6
(Italy) Adriano Panatta (Australia) Kim Warwick | 4 | 6 | 4
(United States) Matt Mitchell (United States) Peter Rennert | 1 | 2
4 | (United States) Marty Riessen (United States) Sherwood Stewart | 6 | 6
8 | (South Africa) Raymond Moore (United States) Roscoe Tanner | 6 | 3 | 6
(United States) Bill Maze (United States) Butch Walts | 3 | 6 | 7
(United States) Mike Fishbach (South Africa) Bernard Mitton | 6 | 6
2 | (United States) Bob Lutz (United States) Stan Smith | 7 | 7

Quarterfinals
6 | (United States) Gene Mayer (United States) Hank Pfister | 6 | 6
4 | (United States) Marty Riessen (United States) Sherwood Stewart | 2 | 2
(United States) Bill Maze (United States) Butch Walts | 6 | 6
2 | (United States) Bob Lutz (United States) Stan Smith | 7 | 7

Semifinals
6 | (United States) Gene Mayer (United States) Hank Pfister | 4 | 4
2 | (United States) Bob Lutz (United States) Stan Smith | 6 | 6
