= 1978 Transamerica Open – Singles =

Singles
- 1978 Transamerica Open

Final
- Champion: (United States) John McEnroe
- Runner-up: (United States) Dick Stockton
- Score: 2–6, 7–6^{(7–5)}, 6–2

Details
- Draw: 64
- Seeds: 16

Events
Singles	Doubles
← 1977 ·	Pacific Coast Championships	· 1979 →

The 1978 Transamerica Open – Singles was an event of the 1978 Transamerica Open tennis tournament and was played on indoor carpet courts at the Cow Palace in San Francisco, California in the United States, between September 25 and October 2, 1978. The draw comprised 64 players and 16 of them were seeded. Butch Walts was the defending Pacific Coast Championships singles champion but he lost in the first round to Dick Stockton. Eighth-seeded John McEnroe won the singles title after he defeated tenth-seeded Stockton in the final, 2–6, 7–6^{(7–5)}, 6–2.

== Seeds ==
1. (Sweden) Björn Borg (third round)
2. (United States) Vitas Gerulaitis (third round, withdrew)
3. (United States) Brian Gottfried (first round)
4. (United States) Eddie Dibbs (semifinals)
5. (United States) Roscoe Tanner (quarterfinals)
6. (United States) Sandy Mayer (third round)
7. (United States) Harold Solomon (first round)
8. (United States) John McEnroe (champion)
9. (United States) Arthur Ashe (first round)
10. (United States) Dick Stockton (final)
11. (United States) Tim Gullikson (second round)
12. (United States) Stan Smith (first round)
13. (United Kingdom) John Lloyd (third round)
14. (United States) Bob Lutz (second round)
15. (Australia) Tony Roche (second round)
16. (Italy) Adriano Panatta (quarterfinals)

Click on the seed number of a player to go to their draw section.

== Draw ==
=== Key ===
- Q = Qualifier
- WC = Wild card
- LL = Lucky loser
- Alt = Alternate
- ITF = ITF entry
- PR = Protected ranking
- SR = Special ranking
- SE = Special exempt
- JE = Junior exempt
- JR = Junior Accelerator Programme entrant
- CO = College Accelerator Programme entrant
- NG = Next Gen Accelerator Program entrant
- w/o = Walkover
- r = Retired
- d = Defaulted

=== Finals ===
Quarterfinals
(Zimbabwe) Andrew Pattison	2	4
(United States) Pat DuPré	6	6
10	(United States) Dick Stockton	6	6
(United States) Brian Teacher	3	1
5	(United States) Roscoe Tanner	6	7	4
4	(United States) Eddie Dibbs	7	6	6
8	(United States) John McEnroe	6	6
16	(Italy) Adriano Panatta	3	2

Semifinals
(United States) Pat DuPré	4	7	5
10	(United States) Dick Stockton	6	6	7
4	(United States) Eddie Dibbs	4	6
8	(United States) John McEnroe	6	7

Final
10	(United States) Dick Stockton	6	6	2
8	(United States) John McEnroe	2	7	6

=== Top half ===
==== Section 1 ====
First Round
1	(Sweden) Björn Borg	6	6
Q	(United States) Andy Lucchesi	2	0
Q	(United States) Bruce Nichols	6	6
(Sweden) Ove Bengtson	7	7
(Zimbabwe) Andrew Pattison	6	7
(South Africa) Frew McMillan	0	5
(United States) Mike Cahill	6	6
12	(United States) Stan Smith	3	4
15	(Australia) Tony Roche	6	4	6
(Australia) Ross Case	4	6	3
(United States) Gene Mayer	6	4	3
(United States) Johan Kriek	4	6	6
(Australia) Cliff Letcher	2	3
(United States) Pat DuPré	6	6
(United States) Bruce Manson	6	7
7	(United States) Harold Solomon	3	5

Second Round
1	(Sweden) Björn Borg	6	7
(Sweden) Ove Bengtson	1	5
(Zimbabwe) Andrew Pattison	6	6
(United States) Mike Cahill	2	4
15	(Australia) Tony Roche	2	5
(United States) Johan Kriek	6	7
(United States) Pat DuPré	6	2	7
(United States) Bruce Manson	4	6	5

Third Round
1	(Sweden) Björn Borg	6	6	4
(Zimbabwe) Andrew Pattison	7	2	6
(United States) Johan Kriek	3	6	3
(United States) Pat DuPré	6	0	6

Quarterfinals
(Zimbabwe) Andrew Pattison	2	4
(United States) Pat DuPré	6	6

==== Section 2 ====
First Round
3	(United States) Brian Gottfried	6	7	3
(Australia) Allan Stone	7	6	6
(United States) Sherwood Stewart	7	6
(South Africa) Raymond Moore	6	4
(Australia) Terry Rocavert	7	6
(United States) Erik van Dillen	5	3
(United States) Butch Walts	4	4
10	(United States) Dick Stockton	6	6
14	(United States) Bob Lutz	7	4	7
Q	(France) Jean-Baptiste Chanfreau	6	6	6
(United States) Trey Waltke	5	1
(United States) Brian Teacher	7	6
(United States) Lloyd Bourne	6	4	1
(Australia) Geoff Masters	3	6	6
Q	(United States) Brad Rowe	6	4	4
6	(United States) Sandy Mayer	4	6	6

Second Round
(Australia) Allan Stone	7	3	5
(United States) Sherwood Stewart	6	6	7
(Australia) Terry Rocavert	1	3
10	(United States) Dick Stockton	6	6
14	(United States) Bob Lutz	7	6	4
(United States) Brian Teacher	5	7	6
(Australia) Geoff Masters	6	7	6
6	(United States) Sandy Mayer	7	5	7

Third Round
(United States) Sherwood Stewart	7	6	3
10	(United States) Dick Stockton	5	7	6
(United States) Brian Teacher	6	3	7
6	(United States) Sandy Mayer	4	6	6

Quarterfinals
10	(United States) Dick Stockton	6	6
(United States) Brian Teacher	3	1

=== Bottom half ===
==== Section 3 ====
First Round
5	(United States) Roscoe Tanner	7	6
(United States) John Austin	5	3
(United States) Jeff Borowiak	6	6
Q	(United States) Jerry Van Linge	2	3
(United States) Terry Moor	6	3	6
(South Africa) Bernard Mitton	4	6	1
(United States) Tom Gullikson	6	4	6
13	(United Kingdom) John Lloyd	0	6	7
11	(United States) Tim Gullikson	6	6
(United States) Dennis Ralston	1	4
(United States) Hank Pfister	7	6
(Australia) Colin Dibley	6	2
(Paraguay) Víctor Pecci	6	6	6
(United States) Nick Saviano	7	4	3
(United States) Eliot Teltscher	2	5
4	(United States) Eddie Dibbs	6	7

Second Round
5	(United States) Roscoe Tanner	6	6
(United States) Jeff Borowiak	3	2
(United States) Terry Moor	4	6
13	(United Kingdom) John Lloyd	6	7
11	(United States) Tim Gullikson	5	4
(United States) Hank Pfister	7	6
(Paraguay) Víctor Pecci	4	2
4	(United States) Eddie Dibbs	6	6

Third Round
5	(United States) Roscoe Tanner	6	7
13	(United Kingdom) John Lloyd	3	5
(United States) Hank Pfister	5	4
4	(United States) Eddie Dibbs	7	6

Quarterfinals
5	(United States) Roscoe Tanner	6	7	4
4	(United States) Eddie Dibbs	7	6	6

==== Section 4 ====
First Round
8	(United States) John McEnroe	6	4	7
(United States) David Schneider	4	6	6
(United States) Marty Riessen	6	6
Q	(United States) Howard Schoenfield	2	1
Q	(United States) Robert Van't Hof	6	6
(South Africa) Willem Prinsloo	4	3
(Australia) Kim Warwick	6	6	7
9	(United States) Arthur Ashe	7	4	5
16	(Italy) Adriano Panatta	7	3	6
(United Kingdom) Roger Taylor	6	6	1
(Sweden) Jan Norbäck	6	0
(United States) Mike Fishbach	7	6
(South Africa) Bob Hewitt	7	7
(United States) Tony Graham	6	5
(United States) Peter Fleming	6	7	0
2	(United States) Vitas Gerulaitis	7	6	6

Second Round
8	(United States) John McEnroe	7	6
(United States) Marty Riessen	6	0
Q	(United States) Robert Van't Hof	1	6
(Australia) Kim Warwick	6	7
16	(Italy) Adriano Panatta	6	6	6
(United States) Mike Fishbach	7	1	1
(South Africa) Bob Hewitt	4	3
2	(United States) Vitas Gerulaitis	6	6

Third Round
8	(United States) John McEnroe	6	6
(Australia) Kim Warwick	1	4
16	(Italy) Adriano Panatta	w/o
2	(United States) Vitas Gerulaitis

Quarterfinals
8	(United States) John McEnroe	6	6
16	(Italy) Adriano Panatta	3	2
