= 1989 Ebel German Open – Singles =

Singles
- 1989 Ebel German Open

Final
- Champion: (Czechoslovakia) Ivan Lendl
- Runner-up: (Austria) Horst Skoff
- Score: 6–4, 6–1, 6–3

Details
- Draw: 56 (5WC/7Q/1LL)
- Seeds: 16

Events
Singles	Doubles
← 1988 ·	Hamburg European Open	· 1990 →

Kent Carlsson was the defending champion, but lost in the second round to Goran Ivanišević.

Ivan Lendl won the title by defeating Horst Skoff 6–4, 6–1, 6–3 in the final.

== Seeds ==
The first eight seeds received a bye into the second round.

1. (Czechoslovakia) Ivan Lendl (champion)
2. (West Germany) Boris Becker (semifinals)
3. (Switzerland) Jakob Hlasek (second round)
4. (Sweden) Kent Carlsson (second round)
5. (n/a)
6. (United States) Jimmy Connors (quarterfinals)
7. (Argentina) Guillermo Pérez Roldán (third round)
8. (United States) Aaron Krickstein (second round)
9. (Spain) Emilio Sánchez (second round)
10. (Sweden) Jonas Svensson (quarterfinals)
11. (Argentina) Alberto Mancini (first round)
12. (Australia) Darren Cahill (first round)
13. (Soviet Union) Andrei Chesnokov (first round)
14. (Austria) Horst Skoff (final)
15. (Soviet Union) Alexander Volkov (first round)
16. (Uruguay) Marcelo Filippini (second round)

== Draw ==
=== Key ===
- Q = Qualifier
- WC = Wild card
- LL = Lucky loser
- Alt = Alternate
- ITF = ITF entry
- PR = Protected ranking
- SR = Special ranking
- SE = Special exempt
- JE = Junior exempt
- JR = Junior Accelerator Programme entrant
- CO = College Accelerator Programme entrant
- NG = Next Gen Accelerator Program entrant
- w/o = Walkover
- r = Retired
- d = Defaulted

=== Finals ===
Quarterfinals
1	(Czechoslovakia) Ivan Lendl	6	6
10	(Sweden) Jonas Svensson	2	1
(West Germany) Carl-Uwe Steeb	6	6
6/WC	(United States) Jimmy Connors	4	1
WC	(West Germany) Michael Westphal	1	3
14	(Austria) Horst Skoff	6	6
(Italy) Paolo Canè
2	(West Germany) Boris Becker	w/o

Semifinals
1	(Czechoslovakia) Ivan Lendl	4	6	6
(West Germany) Carl-Uwe Steeb	6	3	1
14	(Austria) Horst Skoff	7	6
2	(West Germany) Boris Becker	6	2

Final
1	(Czechoslovakia) Ivan Lendl	6	6	6
14	(Austria) Horst Skoff	4	1	3

=== Top half ===
==== Section 1 ====
First round
WC	(Iran) M Bahrami	3	5
(Soviet Union) A Cherkasov	6	7
(Mexico) L Lavalle	6	2
(West Germany) P Kühnen	7	6
(Spain) S Casal	4	6	2
16	(Uruguay) M Filippini	6	3	6
10	(Sweden) J Svensson	6	6
(West Germany) M Stich	4	0
(Argentina) F Davín	6	6
(Sweden) J Carlsson	3	0
(Sweden) J Nyström	2	3
(West Germany) U Riglewski	6	6

Second round
1	(Czech Republic) I Lendl	6	6
(Soviet Union) A Cherkasov	4	4
(West Germany) P Kühnen	6	7
16	(Uruguay) M Filippini	1	6
10	(Sweden) J Svensson	6	6
(Argentina) F Davín	2	4
(West Germany) U Riglewski	1	2
7	(Argentina) G Pérez Roldán	6	6

Third round
1	(Czech Republic) I Lendl	6	6
(West Germany) P Kühnen	1	1
10	(Sweden) J Svensson	6	6
7	(Argentina) G Pérez Roldán	4	1

Quarterfinals
1	(Czech Republic) I Lendl	6	6
10	(Sweden) J Svensson	2	1

==== Section 2 ====
First round
(Spain) F Luna	5	6	6
Q	(Chile) JA Fernández	7	0	2
(West Germany) CU Steeb	6	6
(France) O Delaître	3	2
(Sweden) J Gunnarson	6	6
13	(Soviet Union) A Chesnokov	4	3
11	(Argentina) A Mancini	7	2	5
(Spain) S Bruguera	5	6	7
(Czechoslovakia) M Vajda	7	4	6
(Belgium) E Masso	6	6	3
(Spain) J Arrese	1	0^{r}
Q	(West Germany) M Zoecke	6	3

Second round
3	(Switzerland) J Hlasek	4	6
(Spain) F Luna	6	7
(West Germany) CU Steeb	6	7
(Sweden) J Gunnarson	2	5
(Spain) S Bruguera	3	7	6
(Czechoslovakia) M Vajda	6	6	3
Q	(West Germany) M Zoecke	4	3
6/WC	(United States) J Connors	6	6

Third round
(Spain) F Luna	3	6	2
(West Germany) CU Steeb	6	1	6
(Spain) S Bruguera	5	6	5
6/WC	(United States) J Connors	7	3	7

Quarterfinals
(West Germany) CU Steeb	6	6
6/WC	(United States) J Connors	4	1

=== Bottom half ===
==== Section 3 ====
First round
WC	(West Germany) M Westphal	3	6	7
WC	(West Germany) A Mronz	6	3	5
Q	(West Germany) A Maurer	6	2
(West Germany) T Meinecke	7	6
Q	(Spain) T Carbonell	6	6
12	(Australia) D Cahill	3	3
14	(Austria) H Skoff	6	5	7
(Czechoslovakia) K Nováček	2	7	6
Q	(Spain) J Clavet	6	6
Q	(Spain) F Roig	1	4
(Italy) C Pistolesi	5	6	5
(Socialist Federal Republic of Yugoslavia) G Ivanišević	7	4	7

Second round
LL	(Peru) P Arraya	3	6	6
WC	(West Germany) M Westphal	6	4	7
(West Germany) T Meinecke	6	2
Q	(Spain) T Carbonell	7	6
14	(Austria) H Skoff	6	6	6
Q	(Spain) J Clavet	7	4	4
(Socialist Federal Republic of Yugoslavia) G Ivanišević	7	4	6
4	(Sweden) K Carlsson	5	6	1

Third round
WC	(West Germany) M Westphal	6	6	6
Q	(Spain) T Carbonell	2	7	4
14	(Austria) H Skoff	2	6	6
(Socialist Federal Republic of Yugoslavia) G Ivanišević	6	2	3

Quarterfinals
WC	(West Germany) M Westphal	1	3
14	(Austria) H Skoff	6	6

==== Section 4 ====
First round
(Italy) D Nargiso	4	6	6
(Czechoslovakia) M Střelba	6	1	1
(Italy) P Canè	6	7
(Sweden) M Gustafsson	2	5
(Argentina) E Bengoechea	1	3
9	(Spain) E Sánchez	6	6
15	(Soviet Union) A Volkov	5	1
(Argentina) M Jaite	7	6
(Sweden) C Bergström	5	6	1
Q	(West Germany) J Wöhrmann	7	4	6
(Spain) J Sánchez	7	6
WC	(West Germany) R Osterthun	6	0

Second round
8	(United States) A Krickstein	5	6	4
(Italy) D Nargiso	7	1	6
(Italy) P Canè	6	6
9	(Spain) E Sánchez	2	4
(Argentina) M Jaite	6	6
Q	(West Germany) J Wöhrmann	2	2
(Spain) J Sánchez	1	3
2	(West Germany) B Becker	6	6

Third round
(Italy) D Nargiso	3	7	2
(Italy) P Canè	6	6	6
(Argentina) M Jaite	2	2
2	(West Germany) B Becker	6	6

Quarterfinals
(Italy) P Canè
2	(West Germany) B Becker	w/o
