= Frankfurt Grand Prix =

Frankfurt Grand Prix may refer to:

- Eschborn–Frankfurt, formerly Rund um den Henninger Turm, a cycling race
- Frankfurt Grand Prix (tennis), a tennis tournament
