= 1980 German Open Championships =

- Date: 12–18 May
- Edition: 72nd
- Category: Grand Prix (Super Series)
- Draw: 64S / 32D
- Prize money: $200,000
- Surface: Clay / outdoor
- Location: Hamburg, West Germany
- Venue: Am Rothenbaum

Champions

Singles
- (United States) Harold Solomon

Doubles
- (Ecuador) Andrés Gómez / (Chile) Hans Gildemeister
- Grand Prix German Open

The 1980 German Open Championships was a men's tennis tournament played on outdoor clay courts at Am Rothenbaum in Hamburg, West Germany that was part of the Super Series of the 1980 Grand Prix circuit. It was the 72nd edition of the event and took place from 12 May until 18 May 1980. Second-seeded Harold Solomon won the singles title.

== Finals ==
=== Singles ===
(United States) Harold Solomon defeated (Argentina) Guillermo Vilas, 6–7, 6–2, 6–4, 2–6, 6–3

- It was Solomon' 2nd singles title of the year and the 20th of his career.

=== Doubles ===
(Ecuador) Andrés Gómez / (Chile) Hans Gildemeister defeated (West Germany) Reinhart Probst / (West Germany) Max Wünschig, 6–3, 6–4
