= 1989 Ebel German Open – Doubles =

Doubles
- 1989 Ebel German Open

Final
- Champions: (Spain) Emilio Sánchez (Spain) Javier Sánchez
- Runners-up: (West Germany) Boris Becker (West Germany) Eric Jelen
- Score: 6–4, 6–1

Details
- Draw: 28
- Seeds: 8

Events
Singles	Doubles
← 1988 ·	Hamburg European Open	· 1990 →

Darren Cahill and Laurie Warder were the defending champions, but Cahill chose to focus on the singles tournament only, losing in the first round. Warder teamed up with Peter Doohan and lost in the quarterfinals to Emilio Sánchez and Javier Sánchez

Emilio and Javier Sánchez won the title by defeating Boris Becker and Eric Jelen 6–4, 6–1 in the final.

== Seeds ==
The first four seeds received a bye into the second round.

1. (South Africa) Christo van Rensburg / (United States) Todd Witsken (semifinals)
2. (South Africa) Pieter Aldrich / (South Africa) Danie Visser (semifinals)
3. (West Germany) Boris Becker / (West Germany) Eric Jelen (final)
4. (Spain) Emilio Sánchez / (Spain) Javier Sánchez (champions)
5. (Australia) Peter Doohan / (Australia) Laurie Warder (quarterfinals)
6. (Socialist Federal Republic of Yugoslavia) Goran Ivanišević / (Italy) Diego Nargiso (first round)
7. (Uruguay) Marcelo Filippini / (Argentina) Christian Miniussi (second round)
8. (West Germany) Patrik Kühnen / (West Germany) Carl-Uwe Steeb (quarterfinals)

== Draw ==
=== Key ===
- Q = Qualifier
- WC = Wild card
- LL = Lucky loser
- Alt = Alternate
- ITF = ITF entry
- PR = Protected ranking
- SR = Special ranking
- SE = Special exempt
- JE = Junior exempt
- JR = Junior Accelerator Programme entrant
- CO = College Accelerator Programme entrant
- NG = Next Gen Accelerator Program entrant
- w/o = Walkover
- r = Retired
- d = Defaulted

=== Finals ===
Semifinals
1	(South Africa) Christo van Rensburg (United States) Todd Witsken	6	1	6
3	(West Germany) Boris Becker (West Germany) Eric Jelen	2	6	7
4	(Spain) Emilio Sánchez (Spain) Javier Sánchez	7	6	7
2	(South Africa) Pieter Aldrich (South Africa) Danie Visser	5	7	6

Final
3	(West Germany) Boris Becker (West Germany) Eric Jelen	4	1
4	(Spain) Emilio Sánchez (Spain) Javier Sánchez	6	6

=== Top half ===
First round
(United States) R Baxter (United States) B Dickinson	6	2	7
(Italy) C Pistolesi (Austria) H Skoff	1	6	5
(Iran) M Bahrami (France) O Delaître	7	6
(Belgium) E Masso (Czechoslovakia) B Stankovič	6	3
(West Germany) T Meinecke (West Germany) M Stich	7	3	4
8	(West Germany) P Kühnen (West Germany) CU Steeb	6	6	6
(Argentina) P Albano (Argentina) M Ingaramo	7	7
(Argentina) G Luza (Argentina) G Pérez Roldán	5	5
(West Germany) R Osterthun (West Germany) U Riglewski	5	7	7
(Denmark) M Mortensen (Sweden) J Svensson	7	5	5
(Sweden) N Kroon (Sweden) J Nyström	5	6	7
6	(Socialist Federal Republic of Yugoslavia) G Ivanišević (Italy) D Nargiso	7	3	6

Second round
1	(South Africa) C van Rensburg (United States) T Witsken	6	6
(United States) R Baxter (United States) B Dickinson	2	4
(Iran) M Bahrami (France) O Delaître	5	4
8	(West Germany) P Kühnen (West Germany) CU Steeb	7	6
3	(West Germany) B Becker (West Germany) E Jelen	6	6
(Argentina) P Albano (Argentina) M Ingaramo	1	2
(West Germany) R Osterthun (West Germany) U Riglewski	6	6
(Sweden) N Kroon (Sweden) J Nyström	4	3

Quarterfinals
1	(South Africa) C van Rensburg (United States) T Witsken	7	6
8	(West Germany) P Kühnen (West Germany) CU Steeb	6	3
3	(West Germany) B Becker (West Germany) E Jelen	6	6	6
(West Germany) R Osterthun (West Germany) U Riglewski	4	7	4

Semifinals
1	(South Africa) C van Rensburg (United States) T Witsken	6	1	6
3	(West Germany) B Becker (West Germany) E Jelen	2	6	7

=== Bottom half ===
First round
5	(Australia) P Doohan (Australia) L Warder	7	6
(Peru) P Arraya (United States) M De Palmer	6	4
(Czechoslovakia) K Nováček (Czechoslovakia) C Suk	4	1
(Spain) S Casal (United States) J Connors	6	6
(West Germany) P Ballauff (Spain) S Bruguera	4	6	6
(West Germany) P Baur (West Germany) A Mronz	6	0	3
7	(Uruguay) M Filippini (Argentina) C Miniussi	6	7
(Brazil) D Marcelino (Brazil) M Menezes	4	5
(West Germany) M Westphal (West Germany) M Zoecke	2	6	6
(Soviet Union) A Olhovskiy (Soviet Union) A Volkov	6	2	4
(Spain) T Carbonell (Spain) C Costa	6	6
(Sweden) M Gustafsson (Mexico) L Lavalle	2	2

Second round
5	(Australia) P Doohan (Australia) L Warder	7	6
(Spain) S Casal (United States) J Connors	6	2
(West Germany) P Ballauff (Spain) S Bruguera	3	5
4	(Spain) E Sánchez (Spain) J Sánchez	6	7
7	(Uruguay) M Filippini (Argentina) C Miniussi	5	7	3
(West Germany) M Westphal (West Germany) M Zoecke	7	5	6
(Spain) T Carbonell (Spain) C Costa	6	4
2	(South Africa) P Aldrich (South Africa) D Visser	7	6

Quarterfinals
5	(Australia) P Doohan (Australia) L Warder	4	7	6
4	(Spain) E Sánchez (Spain) J Sánchez	6	6	7
(West Germany) M Westphal (West Germany) M Zoecke	1	3
2	(South Africa) P Aldrich (South Africa) D Visser	6	6

Semifinals
4	(Spain) E Sánchez (Spain) J Sánchez	7	6	7
2	(South Africa) P Aldrich (South Africa) D Visser	5	7	6
