= 1979 German Open =

- Date: 14–20 May
- Edition: 71st
- Category: Grand Prix (Super Series)
- Draw: 64S / 32D
- Prize money: $175,000
- Surface: Clay / outdoor
- Location: Hamburg, West Germany
- Venue: Am Rothenbaum

Champions

Singles
- (Spain) José Higueras

Doubles
- (Czechoslovakia) Tomáš Šmíd / (Czechoslovakia) Jan Kodeš
← 1978 ·	Grand Prix German Open	· 1980 →

The 1979 German Open was a men's tennis tournament played on outdoor clay courts at Am Rothenbaum in Hamburg, West Germany that was part of the Super Series of the 1979 Grand Prix circuit. It was the 71st edition of the event and took place from 14 May until 20 May 1979. Sixth-seeded José Higueras won the singles title.

== Finals ==
=== Singles ===
(Spain) José Higueras defeated (United States) Harold Solomon, 3–6, 6–1, 6–4, 6–1

- It was Higueras' 2nd singles title of the year and the 8th of his career.

=== Doubles ===
(Czechoslovakia) Tomáš Šmíd / (Czechoslovakia) Jan Kodeš defeated (Australia) Mark Edmondson / (Australia) John Marks, 6–3, 6–1, 7–6

== See also ==
- 1979 WTA German Open – women's tournament
