= List of Germany Davis Cup team representatives =

This is a list of tennis players who have represented the Germany Davis Cup team in an official Davis Cup match. Germany have taken part in the competition since 1913. The team was known as West Germany from 1961 to 1990.

== Germany/West Germany players ==
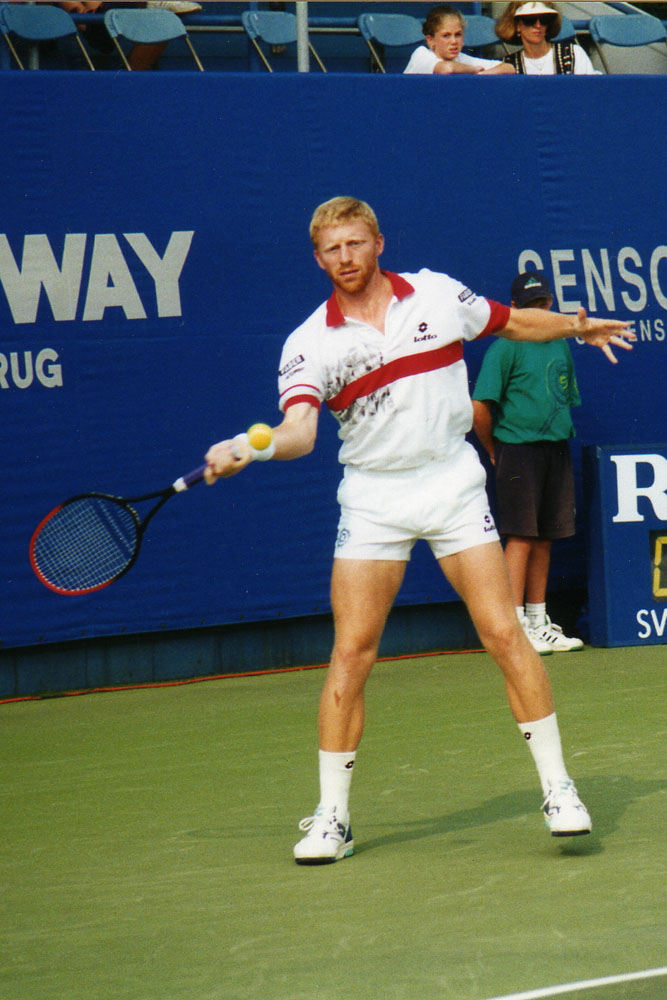
Boris Becker

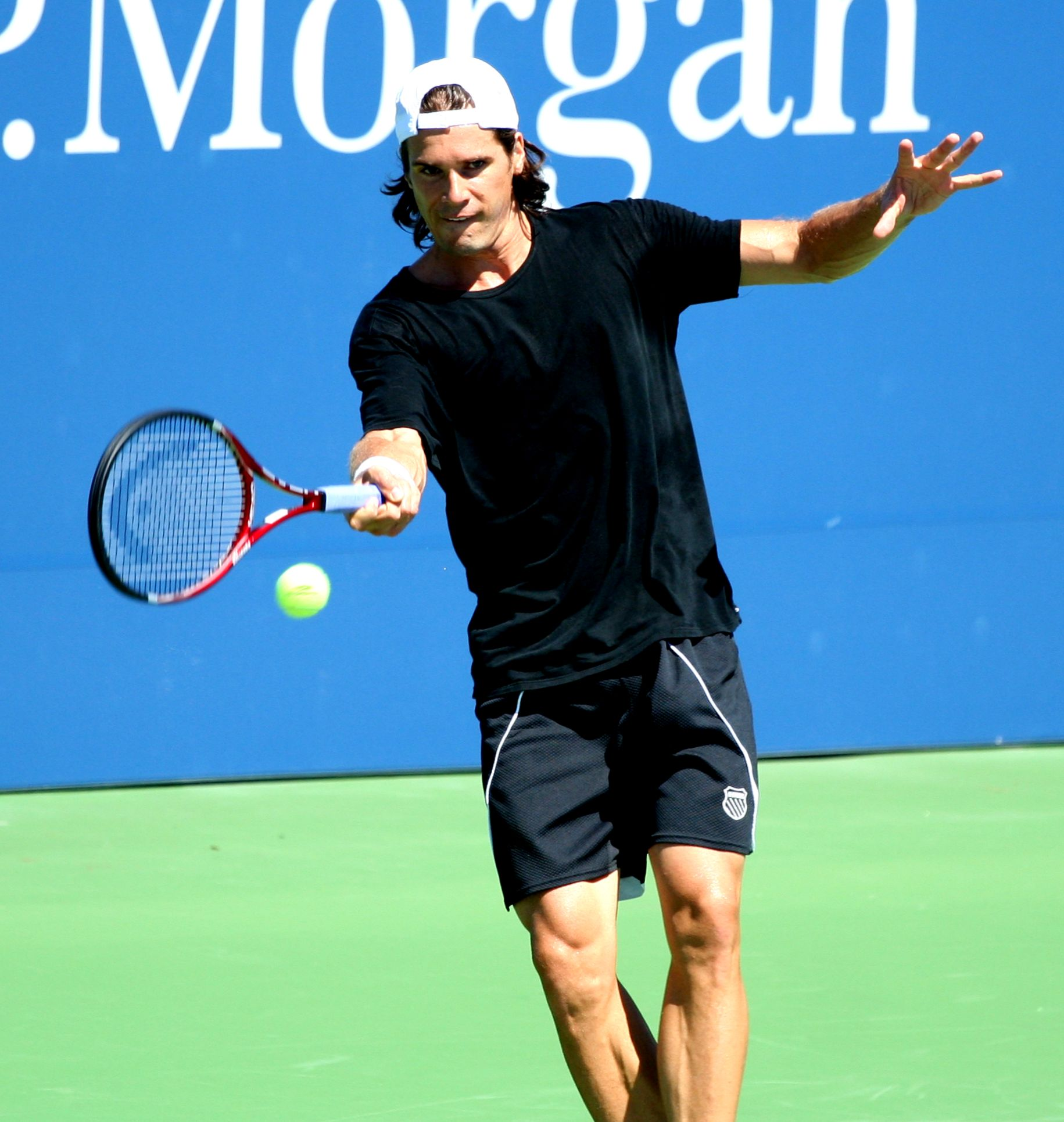
Tommy Haas

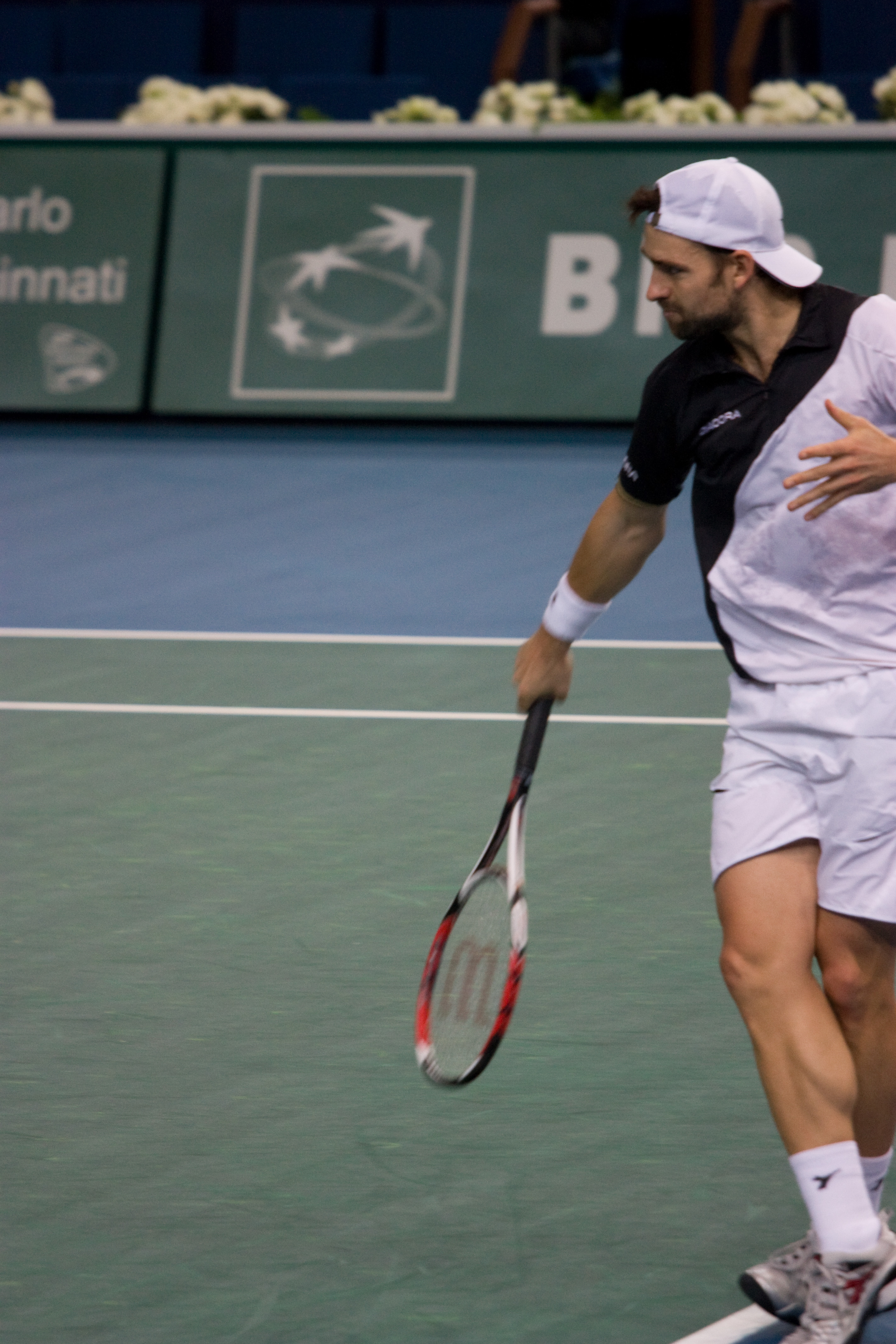
Nicolas Kiefer

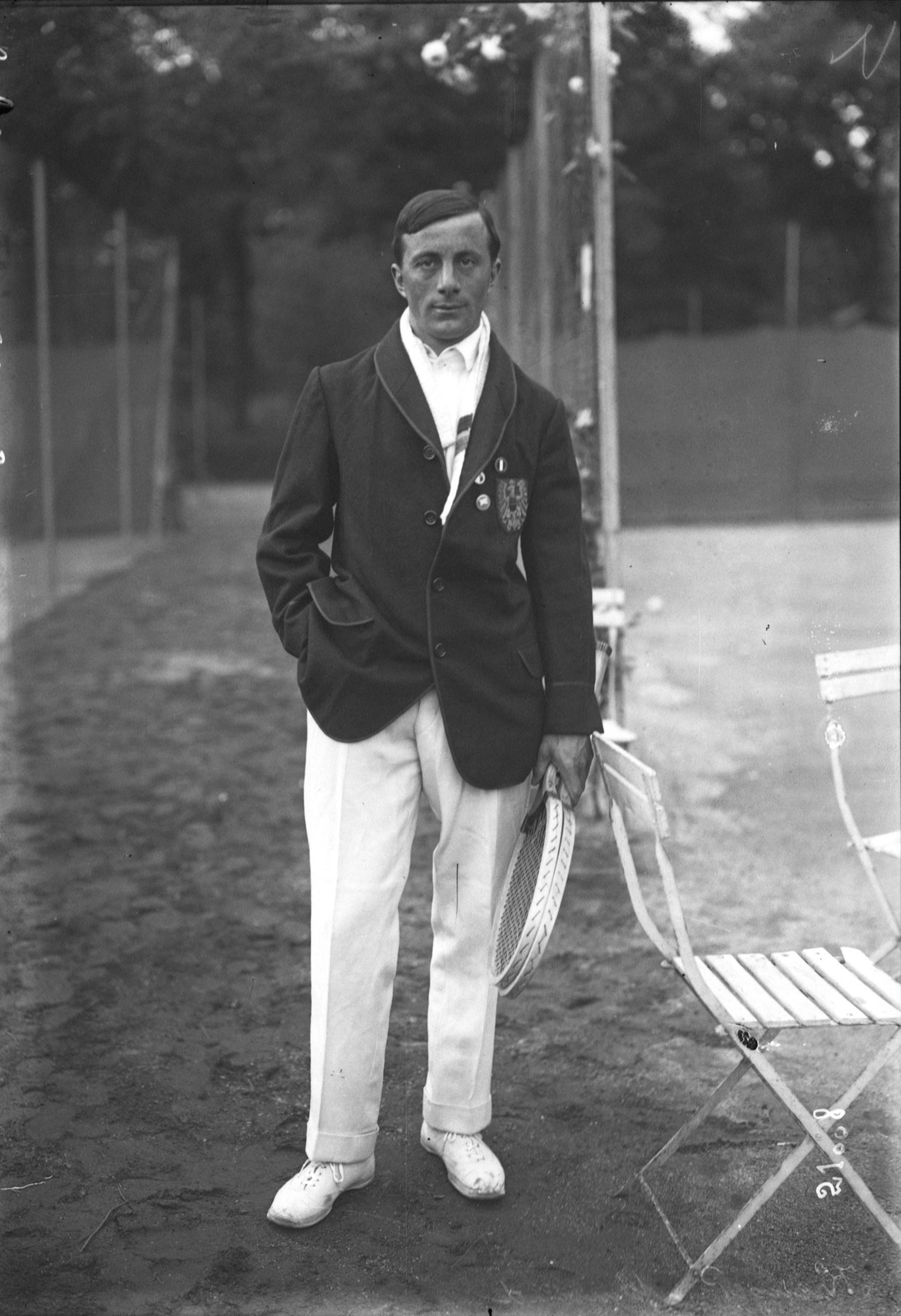
Oscar Kreuzer

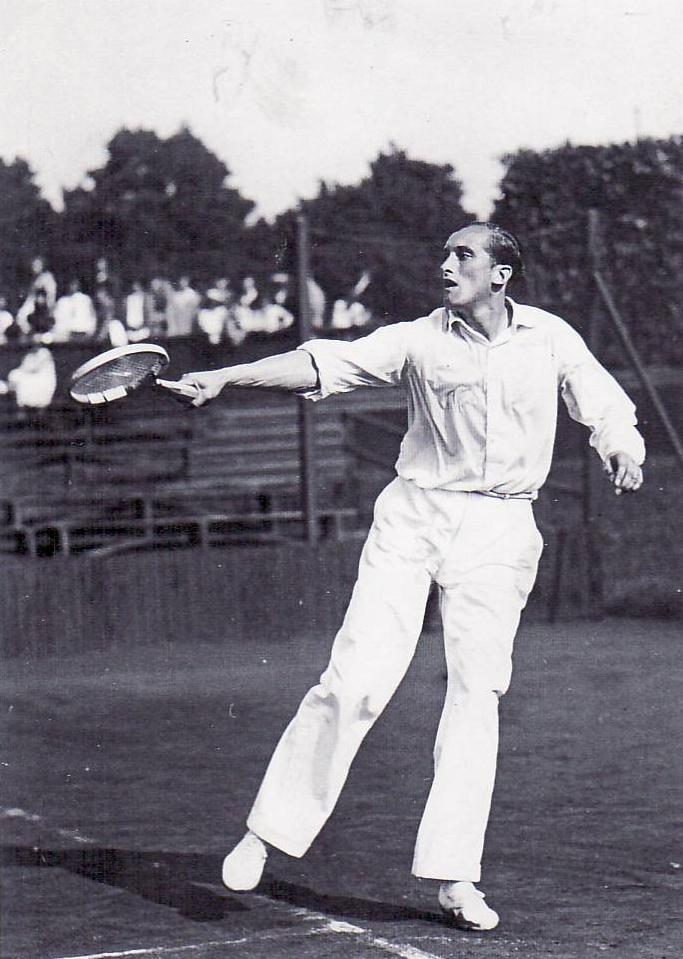
Roderich Menzel

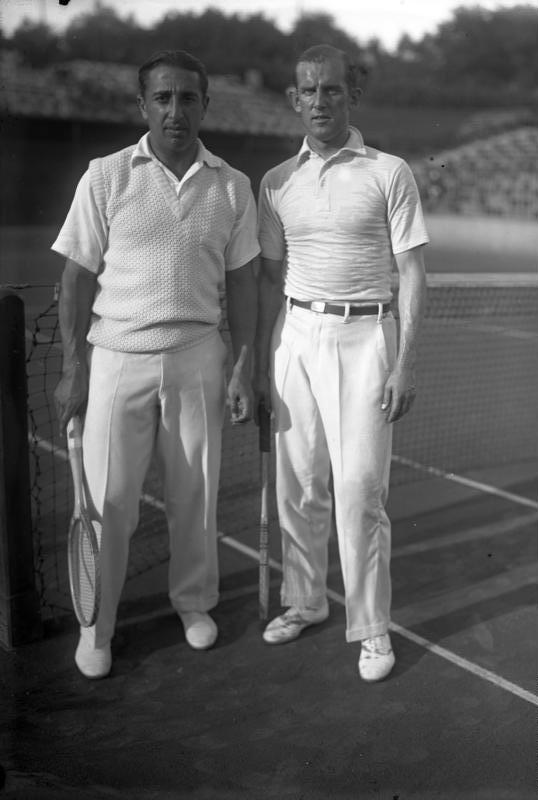
Hans Moldenhauer and Daniel Prenn

Last updated after the 2026 Davis Cup Qualifiers first round.

Player	Win–loss			Ties	Debut
Player	Singles	Doubles	Total	Ties	Debut
Daniel Altmaier	2–2	0–0	2–2	4	2023
Andreas Beck	1–2	1–0	2–2	2	2009
Benjamin Becker	1–4	0–2	1–6	5	2007
Boris Becker	38–3	16–9	54–12	28	1985
Andre Begemann	0–0	0–2	0–2	2	2014
Tomas Behrend	0–1	0–0	0–1	1	2003
Curt Bergmann	0–0	1–1	1–1	2	1928
Michael Berrer	0–2	0–0	0–2	2	2008
Hans-Dieter Beutel	1–3	2–2	3–5	5	1981
Christoph Biederlack	1–3	0–0	1–3	2	1955
Karsten Braasch	0–0	1–1	1–1	2	1994
Daniel Brands	2–0	0–2	2–2	3	2013
Dustin Brown	0–1	0–0	0–1	1	2015
Ernst Buchholz	3–14	2–2	5–16	11	1951
Ingo Buding	26–11	10–5	36–16	26	1961
Wilhelm Bungert	52–27	14–9	66–36	43	1958
Lars Burgsmüller	1–2	0–0	1–2	2	2003
Phillip Buss	2–2	0–0	2–2	2	1928
Georg Demasius	1–0	1–0	2–0	1	1927
Hans Denker	0–3	2–2	2–5	7	1934
Walter Dessart	0–0	1–4	1–4	5	1930
Edgar Dettmer	0–2	0–0	0–2	2	1937
Hendrik Dreekmann	2–4	0–0	2–4	3	1996
Klaus Eberhard	0–2	0–0	0–2	1	1980
Dieter Ecklebe	1–3	0–1	1–4	3	1959
Harald Elschenbroich	7–1	4–1	11–2	10	1965
Peter Elter	4–4	0–0	4–4	4	1978
Martin Emmrich	0–0	0–1	0–1	1	2013
Justin Engel	2–0	0–0	2–0	2	2025
Jürgen Fassbender	6–6	14–8	20–14	23	1968
Franz Feldbausch	2–1	0–2	2–3	2	1956
Friedrich Frenz	2–1	0–0	2–1	2	1934
Otto Froitzheim	1–7	0–1	1–8	5	1913
Rolf Gehring	4–7	1–2	5–9	6	1979
Marc-Kevin Goellner	8–6	4–3	12–9	12	1993
Rolf Göpfert	2–2	5–4	7–6	12	1938
Peter Gojowczyk	1–2	0–0	1–2	2	2014
Simon Greul	1–0	0–0	1–0	1	2010
Helmut Gulcz	0–1	0–0	0–1	1	1951
Tommy Haas	19–7	4–2	23–9	18	1998
Yannick Hanfmann	6–1	0–0	6–1	7	2017
Henner Henkel	33–13	16–4	49–17	27	1935
Horst Hermann	1–2	2–4	3–6	6	1952
Rupert Huber	6–7	2–1	8–8	8	1955
Gustav Jaenecke	1–2	1–0	2–2	3	1932
Eric Jelen	8–4	12–4	20–8	16	1986
Tobias Kamke	1–2	0–2	1–4	2	2013
Bernd Karbacher	1–2	0–0	1–2	2	1994
Christopher Kas	0–2	2–3	2–5	6	2009
Damir Keretić	4–2	0–0	4–2	3	1983
Nicolas Kiefer	10–11	2–3	12–14	15	1998
Heinrich Kleinschroth	0–1	2–6	2–7	9	1913
Jens Knippschild	1–0	1–1	2–1	2	1997
Engelbert Koch	1–4	0–0	1–4	3	1953
Dominik Koepfer	3–2	0–0	3–2	5	2020
Michael Kohlmann	1–2	3–2	4–4	6	2000
Philipp Kohlschreiber	20–14	4–3	24–17	23	2007
Kevin Krawietz	0–1	20–2	20–3	22	2019
Oskar Kreuzer	1–4	0–1	1–5	3	1913
Fritz Kuhlmann	1–1	0–0	1–1	1	1933
Patrik Kühnen	1–1	6–0	7–1	8	1988
Christian Kuhnke	35–15	16–8	51–23	32	1960
Heinz Landmann	2–5	0–2	2–7	5	1927
Kay Lund	0–0	3–2	3–2	5	1935
Ulrich Marten	0–0	0–1	0–1	1	1979
Maximilian Marterer	4–1	0–0	4–1	5	2023
Daniel Masur	0–1	0–1	0–2	2	2016
Andreas Maurer	1–1	5–6	6–7	11	1980
Florian Mayer	10–9	0–0	10–9	12	2004
Karl Meiler	10–7	2–3	12–10	13	1968
Roderich Menzel	7–1	1–0	8–1	5	1939
Andreas Mies	0–0	4–0	4–0	4	2019
Hans Moldenhauer	11–6	3–2	14–8	9	1927
Eberhard Nourney	3–4	4–2	7–6	8	1931
Ricki Osterthun	0–0	0–1	0–1	1	1987
Oscar Otte	0–5	0–0	0–5	5	2022
Philipp Petzschner	2–2	4–5	6–7	9	2007
Ulrich Pinner	12–8	2–1	14–9	10	1976
Hans-Jürgen Pohmann	5–3	13–3	18–6	16	1971
Wolfgang Popp	0–0	3–2	3–2	5	1982
Daniel Prenn	17–5	4–5	21–10	14	1928
David Prinosil	4–6	7–5	11–11	14	1996
Reinhart Probst	0–0	2–1	2–1	3	1978
Tim Pütz	0–0	22–2	22–2	24	2017
Friedrich-Wilhelm Rahe	2–1	1–1	3–2	3	1913
Hans Redl	0–2	0–0	0–2	2	1938
Peter Scholl	1–2	1–3	2–5	5	1956
Rainer Schüttler	9–6	0–3	9–9	11	1999
Hans Schwaier	3–1	0–0	3–1	2	1984
Henri Squire	0–1	0–0	0–1	1	2024
Cedrik-Marcel Stebe	3–1	0–0	3–1	3	2012
Carl-Uwe Steeb	10–10	0–0	10–10	11	1988
Michael Stich	21–9	14–2	35–11	17	1990
Jan-Lennard Struff	17–12	4–0	21–12	26	2015
Wolfgang Stuck	3–3	3–2	6–5	5	1960
Gottfried von Cramm	58–10	24–9	82–19	37	1932
Georg von Metaxa	6–4	7–2	13–6	9	1938
Alexander Waske	1–0	7–1	8–1	8	2004
Michael Westphal	12–7	0–0	12–7	10	1982
Jens Wöhrmann	0–1	0–0	0–1	1	1990
Max Wünschig	1–1	0–0	1–1	1	1979
Christoph Zipf	0–0	1–2	1–2	3	1981
Werner Zirngibl	0–0	1–0	1–0	1	1979
Markus Zoecke	1–2	0–0	1–2	3	1992
Alexander Zverev	11–5	0–1	11–6	9	2016
Mischa Zverev	0–1	0–2	0–3	2	2009
