= 1980 Trevira Cup =

- Date: 17–30 March
- Edition: 1st
- Category: Grand Prix (WCT)
- Draw: 32S / 16D
- Prize money: $175,000
- Surface: Carpet / indoor
- Location: Frankfurt, West Germany
- Venue: Festhalle Frankfurt

Champions

Singles
- (United States) Stan Smith

Doubles
- (United States) Stan Smith / (India) Vijay Amritraj
- Frankfurt Grand Prix

The 1980 Trevira Cup was a men's tennis tournament played on indoor carpet courts at the Festhalle Frankfurt in Frankfurt, West Germany that was part of the WCT category of the 1980 Volvo Grand Prix. It was the inaugural edition of the tournament and was held from 17 March until 23 March 1980. Unseeded Stan Smith won the singles title.

== Finals ==
=== Singles ===
(United States) Stan Smith defeated (South Africa) Johan Kriek 2–6, 7–6, 6–2

- It was Smith' only singles title of the year and the 48th and last of his career in the Open Era.

=== Doubles ===
(United States) Stan Smith / (India) Vijay Amritraj defeated (Zimbabwe) Andrew Pattison / (United States) Butch Walts 6–7, 6–2, 6–2

- It was Smith' 2nd doubles title of the year and the 47th of his career in the Open Era. It was Amritraj' 2nd doubles title of the year and the 10th of his career.
