= 1984 Madrid Tennis Grand Prix =

- Date: 27 February – 4 March
- Edition: 13th
- Category: Grand Prix (Super Series)
- Draw: 32S / 16D
- Prize money: $200,000
- Surface: Carpet / indoor
- Location: Madrid, Spain
- Venue: Pabellón de la Ciudad Deportiva del Real Madrid

Champions

Singles
- (United States) John McEnroe

Doubles
- (United States) Peter Fleming / (United States) John McEnroe
- Madrid Tennis Grand Prix

The 1984 Madrid Grand Prix was a men's tennis tournament played on indoor carpet courts. It was the 13th edition of the tournament and was part of the Super Series of the 1984 Volvo Grand Prix. It was played at the Pabellón de la Ciudad Deportiva del Real Madrid in Madrid, Spain and was held from 27 February until 4 March 1984. First-seeded John McEnroe won the singles title.

== Finals ==
=== Singles ===
(United States) John McEnroe defeated (Czechoslovakia) Tomáš Šmíd 6–0, 6–4

- It was McEnroe's 3rd singles title of the year and the 49th of his career.

=== Doubles ===
(United States) Peter Fleming / (United States) John McEnroe defeated (United States) Fritz Buehning / (United States) Ferdi Taygan 6–3, 6–3

- It was Fleming's 3rd doubles title of the year and the 47th of his career. It was McEnroe's 3rd doubles title of the year and the 58th of his career.
