= 1989 Ebel German Open =

- Date: 8–15 May
- Edition: 80th
- Category: Grand Prix (Super Series)
- Draw: 56S / 28D
- Prize money: $500,000
- Surface: Clay / outdoor
- Location: Hamburg, West Germany
- Venue: Am Rothenbaum

Champions

Singles
- (Czechoslovakia) Ivan Lendl

Doubles
- (Spain) Emilio Sánchez / (Spain) Javier Sánchez
- Grand Prix German Open

The 1989 Ebel German Open was a men's tennis tournament that was part of the Super Series of the 1989 Nabisco Grand Prix circuit. It was the 80th edition of the event and was played on outdoor clay courts at the Am Rothenbaum in Hamburg, West Germany from 8 May until 15 May 1989. The final was postponed to Monday, 15 May due to rain during the weekend. First-seeded Ivan Lendl won the singles title, his second at the event after 1987, and earned $135,000 first-prize money.

Last year's singles winner, Swede Kent Carlsson, was eliminated early this time in the second round. The Czechoslovak Ivan Lendl won the final against the Austrian Horst Skoff in three sets (the final was played in the best-of-five). The defending doubles champions Darren Cahill and Laurie Warder did not compete again in doubles . Cahill didn't play doubles at all and Warder was eliminated in the quarterfinals. It was won by the Spanish pair of brothers Emilio Sánchez Vicario and Javier Sánchez .

== Finals ==
=== Singles ===
(Czechoslovakia) Ivan Lendl defeated (Austria) Horst Skoff 6–4, 6–1, 6–3

- It was Lendl's 5th singles title of the year and the 78th of his career.

=== Doubles ===
(Spain) Emilio Sánchez / (Spain) Javier Sánchez defeated (West Germany) Boris Becker / (West Germany) Eric Jelen 6–4, 6–1
