= 1981 Trevira Cup =

- Date: 30 March – 5 April
- Edition: 2nd
- Category: Grand Prix (WCT)
- Draw: 32S / 16D
- Prize money: $175,000
- Surface: Carpet/ indoor
- Location: Frankfurt, West Germany
- Venue: Festhalle Frankfurt

Champions

Singles
- (United States) John McEnroe

Doubles
- (United States) Butch Walts / (United States) Brian Teacher
- Frankfurt Grand Prix

The 1981 Trevira Cup was a men's tennis tournament played on indoor carpet courts at the Festhalle Frankfurt in Frankfurt, West Germany that was part of the WCT category of the 1981 Volvo Grand Prix. It was the second edition of the tournament and was held from 30 March until 5 April 1981. First-seeded John McEnroe won the singles title.

== Finals ==
=== Singles ===
(United States) John McEnroe defeated (Czechoslovakia) Tomáš Šmíd 6–2, 6–3

- It was McEnroe's 3rd singles title of the year and the 27th of his career.

=== Doubles ===
(United States) Butch Walts / (United States) Brian Teacher defeated (United States) Vitas Gerulaitis / (United States) John McEnroe 7–5, 6–7, 7–5

- It was Walts' 3rd doubles title of the year and the 11th of his career. It was Teacher's 2nd doubles title of the year and the 10th of his career.
