= 1978 Transamerica Open =

- Date: September 25 – October 2
- Edition: 90th
- Category: Grand Prix
- Draw: 64S / 32D
- Prize money: $175,000
- Surface: Carpet / indoor
- Location: San Francisco, U.S.
- Venue: Cow Palace

Champions

Singles
- (United States) John McEnroe

Doubles
- (United States) Peter Fleming / (United States) John McEnroe
- Pacific Coast Championships

The 1978 Transamerica Open, also known as the Pacific Coast Championships, was a men's tennis tournament played on indoor carpet courts at the Cow Palace in San Francisco, California in the United States. The event was part of the 1978 Grand Prix circuit and Barry MacKay was the tournament director. It was the 90th edition of the tournament and ran from September 25 through October 2, 1978. The singles event had a field of 64 players. Eighth-seeded John McEnroe won the singles title and $24,000 first prize money.

== Finals ==
=== Singles ===
(United States) John McEnroe defeated (United States) Dick Stockton 2–6, 7–6^{(7–5)}, 6–2

- It was McEnroe's 2nd singles title of the year and of his career.

=== Doubles ===
(United States) Peter Fleming / (United States) John McEnroe defeated (United States) Bob Lutz / (United States) Stan Smith 5–7, 6–4, 6–4
