= Frankfurt Grand Prix (tennis) =

Defunct tennis tournament
- Event name: Frankfurt Grand Prix; Trevira Cup
- Tour: Grand Prix circuit
- Founded: 1980
- Abolished: 1982
- Editions: 3
- Location: Frankfurt, West Germany
- Surface: Carpet / Indoor

The Frankfurt Grand Prix (also known as the Trevira Cup) was a men's tennis tournament played in Frankfurt, West Germany from 1980 until 1982. The event was part of the Grand Prix tennis circuit and was held on indoor carpet courts. After the 1982 edition tournament director Hans Burkert moved the event to Lisbon where it was known as the Lights Cup (however, according to the ATP website its place in the calendar was followed by the Frankfurt Cup (1987 to 1989).

== Finals ==
=== Singles ===
Year	Champion	Runner-up	Score
1980	(United States) Stan Smith	(South Africa) Johan Kriek	2–6, 7–6, 6–2
1981	(United States) John McEnroe	(Czech Republic) Tomáš Šmíd	6–2, 6–3
1982	(Czech Republic) Ivan Lendl	(Australia) Peter McNamara	6–2, 6–2
succeeded by Lisbon Open

=== Doubles ===
Year	Champions	Runners-up	Score
1980	(India) Vijay Amritraj (United States) Stan Smith	(Zimbabwe) Andrew Pattison (United States) Butch Walts	6–7, 6–2, 6–2
1981	(United States) Brian Teacher (United States) Butch Walts	(United States) Vitas Gerulaitis (United States) John McEnroe	7–5, 6–7, 7–5
1982	(United States) Steve Denton (Australia) Mark Edmondson	(United States) Tony Giammalva (United States) Tim Mayotte	6–7, 6–3, 6–3
succeeded by Lisbon Open

== See also ==
- Frankfurt Cup (1987–1989)
