= Max Wünschig =

German tennis player

- Full name: Max Wünschig
- Country (sports): West Germany
- Born: 4 April 1950 (age 76)

Singles
- Career record: 4-9
- Career titles: 0

Grand Slam singles results
- French Open: 1R (1979)

Doubles
- Career record: 4-9
- Career titles: 0

Max Wünschig (born 4 April 1950) is a former professional tennis player from Germany.

== Biography ==
=== Career ===
Wünschig appeared in the singles draw of the 1979 French Open and lost his first round match to Australian player Warren Maher, in four sets.

A month after the French Open he represented West Germany in a Davis Cup tie against Romania in Bucharest, one of the Europe Zone quarter-final fixtures. His match against Dumitru Hărădău started the tie and he defeated the Romanian to give West Germany a 1–0 lead. By the time he returned for the reverse singles the tie had been lost to Romania and his match against Ilie Năstase was a dead rubber, which he lost in straight sets.

On the Grand Prix tennis circuit he played only in home tournaments and had wins over Harald Elschenbroich, Bruce Manson, Haroon Ismail and Cliff Letcher. In doubles he and Reinhart Probst were surprise finalists at the 1980 German Open, a Grand Prix Super Series event. During their run to the final the pair managed to defeat top Australian pairing Peter McNamara and Paul McNamee.

=== Personal life ===
Wünschig now runs a sports center in Augsburg.

In 2002 he won the 5-million Euro jackpot on German quiz show Die 5-Millionen-SKL-Show.

== Grand Prix career finals ==
=== Doubles: 1 (0–1) ===
Result	W/L	Date	Tournament	Surface	Partner	Opponents	Score
Loss	0–1	May 1980	Hamburg, Germany	Clay	(West Germany) Reinhart Probst	(Chile) Hans Gildemeister (Ecuador) Andrés Gómez	3–6, 4–6

== See also ==
- List of Germany Davis Cup team representatives
