= 1987 Ebel German Open =

- Date: 27 April – 3 May
- Edition: 78th
- Category: Grand Prix (Super Series)
- Draw: 56S / 28D
- Prize money: $300,000
- Surface: Clay / outdoor
- Location: Hamburg, West Germany
- Venue: Am Rothenbaum

Champions

Singles
- (Czechoslovakia) Ivan Lendl

Doubles
- (Czechoslovakia) Miloslav Mečíř / (Czechoslovakia) Tomáš Šmíd
| ← 1986 · | Grand Prix German Open | · 1988 → |

The 1987 Ebel German Open was a men's tennis tournament that was part of the Super Series of the 1987 Nabisco Grand Prix circuit. It was the 78th edition of the event and was played on outdoor clay courts at the Am Rothenbaum in Hamburg, West Germany from 27 April until 3 May 1987. First-seeded Ivan Lendl won the singles title.

== Finals ==
=== Singles ===
(Czechoslovakia) Ivan Lendl defeated (Czechoslovakia) Miloslav Mečíř 6–1, 6–3, 6–3

- It was Lendl's 1st singles title of the year and the 63rd of his career.

=== Doubles ===
(Czechoslovakia) Miloslav Mečíř / (Czechoslovakia) Tomáš Šmíd defeated (Switzerland) Claudio Mezzadri / (United States) Jim Pugh 4–6, 7–6, 6–2
