= 1982 Trevira Cup =

- Date: 29 March – 4 April
- Edition: 3rd
- Category: Grand Prix (Super Series)
- Draw: 32S / 16D
- Prize money: $250,000
- Surface: Carpet / indoor
- Location: Frankfurt, West Germany
- Venue: Festhalle Frankfurt

Champions

Singles
- (Czechoslovakia) Ivan Lendl

Doubles
- (Australia) Mark Edmondson / (United States) Steve Denton
- Frankfurt Grand Prix

The 1982 Trevira Cup was a men's tennis tournament played on indoor carpet courts at the Festhalle Frankfurt in Frankfurt, West Germany that was part of the Super Series category of the 1982 Volvo Grand Prix. It was the third and last edition of the tournament and was held from 29 March until 4 April 1982. First-seeded Ivan Lendl won the singles title.

== Finals ==
=== Singles ===
(Czechoslovakia) Ivan Lendl defeated (Australia) Peter McNamara 6–2, 6–2

- It was Lendl's 6th singles title of the year and the 22nd of his career.

=== Doubles ===
(Australia) Mark Edmondson / (United States) Steve Denton defeated (United States) Tony Giammalva / (United States) Tim Mayotte 6–7, 6–3, 6–3

- It was Edmondson's 5th doubles title of the year and the 18th of his career. It was Denton's 3rd doubles title of the year and the 11th of his career.
