= 1988 Ebel German Open =

- Date: 25 April – 1 May
- Edition: 79th
- Category: Grand Prix
- Draw: 56S / 28D
- Prize money: $400,000
- Surface: Clay / outdoor
- Location: Hamburg, West Germany
- Venue: Am Rothenbaum

Champions

Singles
- (Sweden) Kent Carlsson

Doubles
- (Australia) Darren Cahill / (Australia) Laurie Warder
← 1987 ·	Grand Prix German Open	· 1989 →

The 1988 Ebel German Open was a men's tennis tournament that was part of the 1988 Nabisco Grand Prix circuit. It was the 79th edition of the event and was played on outdoor clay courts at the Am Rothenbaum in Hamburg, West Germany from 25 April until 1 May 1988. Second-seeded Kent Carlsson won the singles title.

== Finals ==
=== Singles ===
(Sweden) Kent Carlsson defeated (France) Henri Leconte 6–2, 6–1, 6–4

- It was Carlsson's 1st singles title of the year and the 6th of his career.

=== Doubles ===
(Australia) Darren Cahill / (Australia) Laurie Warder defeated (United States) Rick Leach / (United States) Jim Pugh 6–0, 5–7, 6–4
