= Reinhart Probst =

German tennis player

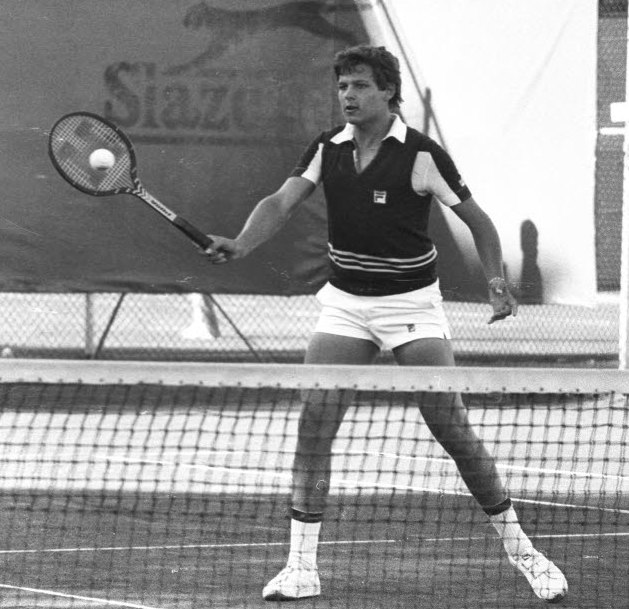
- Full name: Reinhart Probst
- Country (sports): West Germany
- Born: 17 April 1957 (age 68); Coburg, West Germany
- Plays: Right-handed

Singles
- Career record: 8-8
- Career titles: 0

Doubles
- Career record: 12-16
- Career titles: 1

Grand Slam doubles results
- Wimbledon: 1R (1977)

Reinhart Probst (born 17 April 1957) is a former professional tennis player from Germany.

== Biography ==
Probst was a right-handed player, born in Coburg. In 1977 he partnered Ulrich Marten in the men's doubles at the Wimbledon Championships and ended the year by winning a tour event in Zurich, with Nikola Pilić.

He featured in two Davis Cup ties for West Germany in 1978, the first an away fixture against Switzerland, in which he and Ulrich Pinner had the distinction of securing the tie by winning the doubles rubber. It was again Pinner that he partnered with when he played West Germany's doubles rubber in Budapest, a four set loss to Hungarian players Péter Szőke and Balázs Taróczy.

In 1979 he had the best singles performance of his career when he made the semi-finals in Bogota, with wins over Andrés Gómez, Iván Molina and Roger Guedes.

He returned to the West German Davis Cup team in 1980, for a Europe Zone semi-final against Sweden in Bastad. The Swedes had a 2–0 lead going into the doubles and Probst and his partner Rolf Gehring needed a win to keep the tie alive, which they did with a straight sets victory, over the Swedish pairing of Per Hjertquist and Stefan Simonsson, before Björn Borg ended West Germany's campaign in the reverse singles.

On the Grand Prix circuit in 1980 he was runner-up in the doubles at the German Open and had another win over Andrés Gómez, en route to the quarter-finals of the singles event at the 1980 Stuttgart Indoor.

== Grand Prix career finals ==
=== Doubles: 1 (1–1) ===
| Result | W/L | Date | Tournament | Surface | Partner | Opponents | Score |
|---|---|---|---|---|---|---|---|
| Win | 1–0 | Jan 1977 | Zürich, Switzerland | Hard | (Socialist Federal Republic of Yugoslavia) Nikola Pilić | (France) Patrice Hagelauer (France) Christophe Roger-Vasselin | 6–3, 6–1 |
| Loss | 1–1 | May 1980 | Hamburg, West Germany | Clay | (West Germany) Max Wünschig | (Chile) Hans Gildemeister (Ecuador) Andrés Gómez | 3–6, 4–6 |

== See also ==
- List of Germany Davis Cup team representatives
