= 1977 Transamerica Open =

- Date: September 26 – October 2
- Edition: 89th
- Category: Grand Prix (4 Star)
- Draw: 64S / 32D
- Prize money: $125,000
- Surface: Carpet / indoor
- Location: San Francisco, U.S.
- Venue: Cow Palace

Champions

Singles
- (United States) Butch Walts

Doubles
- (United States) Dick Stockton / (United States) Marty Riessen
- Pacific Coast Championships

The 1977 Transamerica Open, also known as the Pacific Coast Championships, was a men's tennis tournament played on indoor carpet courts at the Cow Palace in San Francisco, California in the United States. The event was part of the 4 Star category of the 1977 Grand Prix circuit and Barry MacKay (tennis) was the tournament director. It was the 89th edition of the tournament and was held from September 26 through October 2, 1977. The singles event had a field of 64 players. Unseeded Butch Walts won the singles title.

== Finals ==
=== Singles ===
(United States) Butch Walts defeated (United States) Brian Gottfried 4–6, 6–3, 7–5

- It was Walts's 1st singles title of the year and the 2nd of his career.

=== Doubles ===
(United States) Dick Stockton / (United States) Marty Riessen defeated (United States) Fred McNair / (United States) Sherwood Stewart 6–4, 1–6, 6–4
