= 1979 Transamerica Open =

- Date: September 24–30
- Edition: 91st
- Category: Grand Prix
- Draw: 64S / 32D
- Prize money: $175,000
- Surface: Carpet / indoor
- Location: San Francisco, U.S.
- Venue: Cow Palace

Champions

Singles
- (United States) John McEnroe

Doubles
- (United States) Peter Fleming / (United States) John McEnroe
- Pacific Coast Championships

The 1979 Transamerica Open, also known as the Pacific Coast Championships, was a men's tennis tournament played on indoor carpet courts at the Cow Palace in San Francisco, California in the United States. The event was part of the 1979 Colgate-Palmolive Grand Prix circuit. It was the 91st edition of the tournament and was held from September 24 through September 30, 1979. The singles event had a field of 64 players. First-seeded John McEnroe won his second consecutive singles title at the event.

== Finals ==
=== Singles ===
(United States) John McEnroe defeated (United States) Peter Fleming 4–6, 7–5, 6–2

- It was McEnroe's 8th singles title of the year and the 13th of his career.

=== Doubles ===
(United States) Peter Fleming / (United States) John McEnroe defeated (Poland) Wojciech Fibak / (South Africa) Frew McMillan 6–1, 6–4
