= 1981 Swedish Open – Singles =

Singles
- 1981 Swedish Open

Final
- Champion: (France) Thierry Tulasne
- Runner-up: (Sweden) Anders Järryd
- Score: 6–2, 6–3

Details
- Draw: 32
- Seeds: 8

Events
| Singles | Doubles |
| ← 1980 · | Swedish Open | · 1982 → |

Balázs Taróczy was the defending champion, but chose to compete at Hilversum in the same week.

Thierry Tulasne won the title by defeating Anders Järryd 6–2, 6–3 in the final.

== Seeds ==
1. (Australia) Peter McNamara (quarterfinals)
2. (Australia) Paul McNamee (quarterfinals, retired)
3. (Australia) Mark Edmondson (quarterfinals)
4. (Australia) John Fitzgerald (quarterfinals)
5. (Sweden) Per Hjertquist (second round)
6. (France) Thierry Tulasne (champion)
7. (Sweden) Jan Norbäck (first round)
8. (Australia) Paul Kronk (second round)

== Draw ==
=== Key ===
- Q = Qualifier
- WC = Wild card
- LL = Lucky loser
- Alt = Alternate
- ITF = ITF entry
- PR = Protected ranking
- SR = Special ranking
- SE = Special exempt
- JE = Junior exempt
- JR = Junior Accelerator Programme entrant
- CO = College Accelerator Programme entrant
- NG = Next Gen Accelerator Program entrant
- w/o = Walkover
- r = Retired
- d = Defaulted

=== Finals ===
Semifinals
6 | (France) Thierry Tulasne | 6 | 7
(Sweden) Joakim Nyström | 2 | 6
(Spain) Fernando Luna | 3 | 4
(Sweden) Anders Järryd | 6 | 6

Final
6 | (France) Thierry Tulasne | 6 | 6
(Sweden) Anders Järryd | 2 | 3

=== Top half ===
First round
1 | (Australia) P McNamara | 6 | 6
(Australia) W Hampson | 3 | 4
(Sweden) M Wilander | 6 | 6
(Sweden) T Svensson | 1 | 4
(Spain) R Vizcaíno | 6 | 0 | 6
(Austria) B Pils | 2 | 6 | 2
(United States) L Bourne | 5 | 4
6 | (France) T Tulasne | 7 | 6
3 | (Australia) M Edmondson | 7 | 7
(Sweden) S Simonsson | 5 | 6
(Sweden) J Gunnarsson | 6 | 7
(Australia) D Carter | 3 | 5
(West Germany) A Maurer | 2 | 3
(Sweden) H Simonsson | 6 | 6
(Sweden) J Nyström | 6 | 6
7 | (Sweden) J Norbäck | 3 | 3

Second round
1 | (Australia) P McNamara | 1 | 6 | 6
(Sweden) M Wilander | 6 | 2 | 4
(Spain) R Vizcaíno | 4 | 4
6 | (France) T Tulasne | 6 | 6
3 | (Australia) M Edmondson | 6 | 6
(Sweden) J Gunnarsson | 0 | 3
(Sweden) H Simonsson | 3 | 4
(Sweden) J Nyström | 6 | 6

Quarterfinals
1 | (Australia) P McNamara | 1 | 0
6 | (France) T Tulasne | 6 | 6
3 | (Australia) M Edmondson | 2 | 0
(Sweden) J Nyström | 6 | 6

Semifinals
6 | (France) T Tulasne | 6 | 7
(Sweden) J Nyström | 2 | 6

=== Bottom half ===
First round
5 | (Sweden) P Hjertquist | 6 | 3 | 6
(Sweden) S Svensson | 0 | 6 | 3
(New Zealand) O Parun | 3 | 2
(Spain) F Luna | 6 | 6
(Sweden) H Sundström | 6 | 6 | 1
(Sweden) O Palmer | 3 | 7 | 6
(Finland) L Palin | 0 | 0
4 | (Australia) J Fitzgerald | 6 | 6
8 | (Australia) P Kronk | 2 | 6 | 6
(Germany) U Marten | 6 | 0 | 0
(Sweden) J Windahl | 4 | 5
(Sweden) A Järryd | 6 | 7
(Italy) C Panatta | 6 | 6
(Australia) C Johnstone | 4 | 4
(Austria) H Kary | 2 | 7 | 1
2 | (Australia) P McNamee | 6 | 6 | 6

Second round
5 | (Sweden) P Hjertquist | 2 | 6 | 3
(Spain) F Luna | 6 | 4 | 6
(Sweden) O Palmer | 3 | 3
4 | (Australia) J Fitzgerald | 6 | 6
8 | (Australia) P Kronk | 2 | 4
(Sweden) A Järryd | 6 | 6
(Italy) C Panatta | 4 | 5
2 | (Australia) P McNamee | 6 | 7

Quarterfinals
(Spain) F Luna | 6 | 6 | 6
4 | (Australia) J Fitzgerald | 4 | 7 | 2
(Sweden) A Järryd | 3 | 1
2 | (Australia) P McNamee | 6 | 0^{r}

Semifinals
(Spain) F Luna | 3 | 4
(Sweden) A Järryd | 6 | 6
