= 1985 Custom Credit Australian Indoor Championships =

- Date: 14–21 October
- Edition: 13th
- Draw: 32S / 16D
- Prize money: $225,000
- Surface: Hard / indoor
- Location: Sydney, Australia
- Venue: Sydney Entertainment Centre

Champions

Singles
- (Czechoslovakia) Ivan Lendl

Doubles
- (Australia) John Fitzgerald / (Sweden) Anders Järryd
← 1984 ·	Australian Indoor Tennis Championships	· 1986 →

The 1985 Custom Credit Australian Indoor Championships was a men's tennis tournament played on indoor hard courts at the Sydney Entertainment Centre in Sydney in Australia and was part of the 1985 Nabisco Grand Prix. The tournament ran from 14 through 21 October 1985. Top-seeded Ivan Lendl won the singles title.

== Finals ==
=== Singles ===
(Czechoslovakia) Ivan Lendl defeated (France) Henri Leconte 6–4, 6–4, 7–6

- It was Lendl's 8th title of the year and the 55th of his career.

=== Doubles ===
(Australia) John Fitzgerald / (Sweden) Anders Järryd defeated (Australia) Mark Edmondson / (Australia) Kim Warwick 6–3, 6–2

- It was Fitzgerald's 3rd title of the year and the 15th of his career. It was Järryd's 7th title of the year and the 27th of his career.
