= 1985 Custom Credit Australian Indoor Championships – Doubles =

Doubles
- 1985 Custom Credit Australian Indoor Championships

Final
- Champions: (Australia) John Fitzgerald (Sweden) Anders Järryd
- Runners-up: (Australia) Mark Edmondson (Australia) Kim Warwick
- Score: 6–3, 6–2

Details
- Draw: 16
- Seeds: 4

Events
Singles	Doubles
← 1984 ·	Australian Indoor Tennis Championships	· 1986 →

Anders Järryd and Hans Simonsson were the defending champions but only Järryd competed that year with John Fitzgerald.

Fitzgerald and Järryd won in the final 6–3, 6–2 against Mark Edmondson and Kim Warwick.

== Seeds ==
1. (Australia) John Fitzgerald / (Sweden) Anders Järryd (champions)
2. (United States) Paul Annacone / (South Africa) Christo van Rensburg (first round)
3. (Australia) Mark Edmondson / (Australia) Kim Warwick (final)
4. (Ecuador) Andrés Gómez / (Czechoslovakia) Ivan Lendl (quarterfinals)

== Draw ==
=== Key ===
- Q = Qualifier
- WC = Wild card
- LL = Lucky loser
- Alt = Alternate
- ITF = ITF entry
- PR = Protected ranking
- SR = Special ranking
- SE = Special exempt
- JE = Junior exempt
- JR = Junior Accelerator Programme entrant
- CO = College Accelerator Programme entrant
- NG = Next Gen Accelerator Program entrant
- w/o = Walkover
- r = Retired
- d = Defaulted

First round
1	(Australia) J Fitzgerald (Sweden) A Järryd	6	6
(United States) M Freeman (New Zealand) D Mustard	4	0
(United States) D Dowlen (Nigeria) N Odizor	7	6
(United States) L Bourne (United States) M Mitchell	5	4
4	(Ecuador) A Gómez (Czechoslovakia) I Lendl	6	6
(Australia) J Alexander (Australia) L Warder	4	2
(Paraguay) F González (Australia) D Graham	6	5
(United States) T Moor (United States) B Testerman	7	7
(United States) C Hooper (United States) G Layendecker	7	6
(Australia) M Kratzmann (Australia) S Youl	6	4
(United States) M Davis (Australia) B Drewett	4	6
3	(Australia) M Edmondson (Australia) K Warwick	6	7
(Australia) B Dyke (Australia) W Masur	6	6
(Australia) M Fancutt (Australia) C Miller	1	2
(Australia) P Doohan (New Zealand) K Evernden	4	7	6
2	(United States) P Annacone (South Africa) C van Rensburg	6	6	4

Quarterfinals
1	(Australia) J Fitzgerald (Sweden) A Järryd	6	6
(United States) D Dowlen (Nigeria) N Odizor	3	3
4	(Ecuador) A Gómez (Czechoslovakia) I Lendl	4	6	3
(United States) T Moor (United States) B Testerman	6	4	6
(United States) C Hooper (United States) G Layendecker	4	4
3	(Australia) M Edmondson (Australia) K Warwick	6	6
(Australia) B Dyke (Australia) W Masur	6	7	3
(Australia) P Doohan (New Zealand) K Evernden	7	5	6

Semifinals
1	(Australia) J Fitzgerald (Sweden) A Järryd	6	6
(United States) T Moor (United States) B Testerman	3	0
3	(Australia) M Edmondson (Australia) K Warwick	4	6	7
(Australia) P Doohan (New Zealand) K Evernden	6	4	6

Final
1	(Australia) J Fitzgerald (Sweden) A Järryd	6	6
3	(Australia) M Edmondson (Australia) K Warwick	3	2
