= 1981 Swedish Open =

- Date: 20–27 July
- Edition: 34th
- Category: Grand Prix
- Draw: 32S/16D
- Prize money: $75,000
- Surface: Clay / Outdoor
- Location: Båstad, Sweden

Champions

Singles
- (France) Thierry Tulasne

Doubles
- (Australia) Mark Edmondson / (Australia) John Fitzgerald
← 1980 ·	Swedish Open	· 1982 →

The 1981 Swedish Open was a men's professional tennis tournament played on outdoor clay courts and held in Båstad, Sweden. It was part of the 1981 Grand Prix circuit. It was the 34th edition of the tournament and was held from July 20 through July 27, 1981. Sixth-seeded Thierry Tulasne won the singles title.

== Finals ==
=== Singles ===
(France) Thierry Tulasne defeated (Sweden) Anders Jarryd 6–2, 6–3

- It was Tulasne's only singles title of the year and the first of his career.

=== Doubles ===
(Australia) Mark Edmondson / (Australia) John Fitzgerald defeated (Sweden) Anders Jarryd / (Sweden) Hans Simonsson 2–6, 7–5, 6–0
