= 1981 Swedish Open – Doubles =

Doubles
- 1981 Swedish Open

Final
- Champions: (Australia) Mark Edmondson (Australia) John Fitzgerald
- Runners-up: (Sweden) Anders Järryd (Sweden) Hans Simonsson
- Score: 2–6, 7–5, 6–0

Events
Singles	Doubles
← 1980 ·	Swedish Open	· 1982 →

Heinz Günthardt and Markus Günthardt were the defending champions, but both players decided to compete at Hilversum in the same week, partnering different players.

Mark Edmondson and John Fitzgerald won the title by defeating Anders Järryd and Hans Simonsson 2–6, 7–5, 6–0 in the final.

== Seeds ==
1. (Australia) Peter McNamara / (Australia) Paul McNamee (semifinals, withdrew)
2. (Australia) David Carter / (Australia) Paul Kronk (semifinals)
3. (Sweden) Anders Järryd / (Sweden) Hans Simonsson (final)
4. (Australia) Mark Edmondson / (Australia) John Fitzgerald (champions)

== Draw ==
=== Key ===
- Q = Qualifier
- WC = Wild card
- LL = Lucky loser
- Alt = Alternate
- ITF = ITF entry
- PR = Protected ranking
- SR = Special ranking
- SE = Special exempt
- JE = Junior exempt
- JR = Junior Accelerator Programme entrant
- CO = College Accelerator Programme entrant
- NG = Next Gen Accelerator Program entrant
- w/o = Walkover
- r = Retired
- d = Defaulted

=== Draw ===
First round
1	(Australia) P McNamara (Australia) P McNamee	6	6
(Sweden) T Hogstedt (Sweden) H Sundström	4	1
(United States) L Bourne (Finland) L Palin	6	6
(Sweden) P Larsson (Sweden) J Windahl	2	3
(Sweden) P Hjertquist (Sweden) O Palmer	2	1
4	(Australia) M Edmondson (Australia) J Fitzgerald	6	6
(Italy) C Panatta (New Zealand) O Parun	6	6
(Spain) J Aguilera (Denmark) P Henriksen	2	4
(Austria) H Kary (Austria) B Pils	6	4	6
(Spain) F Luna (Spain) R Vizcaíno	3	6	3
3	(Sweden) A Järryd (Sweden) H Simonsson	3	6	6
(Australia) W Hampson (Australia) C Johnstone	6	1	2
(Sweden) J Nyström (Sweden) M Tideman	4	6	7
(Sweden) J Gunnarsson (Sweden) T Svensson	6	3	6
(Sweden) S Simonsson (Sweden) M Wilander	4	3
2	(Australia) D Carter (Australia) P Kronk	6	6

Quarterfinals
1	(Australia) P McNamara (Australia) P McNamee	6	6
(United States) L Bourne (Finland) L Palin	3	3
4	(Australia) M Edmondson (Australia) J Fitzgerald	6	6
(Italy) C Panatta (New Zealand) O Parun	3	4
(Austria) H Kary (Austria) B Pils	1	3
3	(Sweden) A Järryd (Sweden) H Simonsson	6	6
(Sweden) J Nyström (Sweden) M Tideman	5	1
2	(Australia) D Carter (Australia) P Kronk	7	6

Semifinals
1	(Australia) P McNamara (Australia) P McNamee
4	(Australia) M Edmondson (Australia) J Fitzgerald	w/o
3	(Sweden) A Järryd (Sweden) H Simonsson	6	7
2	(Australia) D Carter (Australia) P Kronk	2	5

Final
4	(Australia) M Edmondson (Australia) J Fitzgerald	2	7	6
3	(Sweden) A Järryd (Sweden) H Simonsson	6	5	0
