= 1982 Ancona Open =

- Date: 15–21 November
- Edition: 1st
- Category: Grand Prix
- Draw: 32S / 16D
- Prize money: $75,000
- Surface: Carpet / indoor
- Location: Ancona, Italy

Champions

Singles
- (Sweden) Anders Järryd

Doubles
- (Sweden) Anders Järryd / (Sweden) Hans Simonsson
Ancona Open

The 1982 Ancona Open was a men's tennis tournament that was part of the Grand Prix circuit and was held in Ancona, Italy. The tournament was held from 15 November until 21 November 1982, and was played on indoor carpet courts. Third-seeded Anders Järryd won the singles final.

== Finals ==
=== Singles ===
(Sweden) Anders Järryd defeated (United States) Mike De Palmer 6–3, 6–2

- It was Järryd's 2nd and last singles title of the year and the 2nd of his career.

=== Doubles ===
(Sweden) Anders Järryd / (Sweden) Hans Simonsson defeated (United States) Tim Gullikson / (South Africa) Bernard Mitton 6–4, 6–3
