= 1982 Ancona Open – Singles =

Singles
- 1982 Ancona Open

Final
- Champion: (Sweden) Anders Järryd
- Runner-up: (United States) Mike De Palmer
- Score: 6–3, 6–2

Details
- Draw: 32 (4Q/1LL)
- Seeds: 8

Events
| Singles | Doubles |
| Ancona Open |

Anders Järryd defeated Mike De Palmer 6–3, 6–2 in the final to secure the title.

== Seeds ==
The text in italics indicates the round in which that seed exited the tournament.

1. (United States) Vincent Van Patten (quarterfinals)
2. (Sweden) Hans Simonsson (semifinals)
3. (Sweden) Anders Järryd (champion)
4. (Bolivia) Mario Martinez (quarterfinals)
5. (Italy) Corrado Barazzutti (second round)
6. (Italy) Gianluca Rinaldini (first round)
7. (Sweden) Magnus Tideman (first round)
8. (United States) Mike De Palmer (final)

== Draws ==
=== Key ===
- Q = Qualifier
- WC = Wild card
- LL = Lucky loser
- Alt = Alternate
- SE = Special exempt
- PR = Protected ranking
- ITF = ITF entry
- JE = Junior exempt
- w/o = Walkover
- r = Retired
- d = Defaulted
- SR = Special ranking

=== Finals ===
Semifinals
(South Africa) Bernard Mitton | 7 | 1 | 3
8 | (United States) Mike De Palmer | 5 | 6 | 6
3 | (Sweden) Anders Järryd | 6 | 5 | 7
2 | (Sweden) Hans Simonsson | 2 | 7 | 6

Finals
8 | (United States) Mike De Palmer | 3 | 2
3 | (Sweden) Anders Järryd | 6 | 6

=== Section 1 ===
First round
1 | (United States) V Van Patten | 6 | 6
(Italy) E Artaldi | 3 | 4
(United States) M Vines | 7 | 6 | 6
(Italy) A Zugarelli | 5 | 7 | 3
(United Kingdom) R Lewis | 4 | 4
LL | (France) J Piacentile | 6 | 6
(South Africa) B Mitton | 6 | 6
6 | (Italy) G Rinaldini | 2 | 3
4 | (Bolivia) M Martinez | 6 | 2 | 6
(Chile) A Pierola | 3 | 6 | 3
(Germany) H Beutel | 5 | 6
Q | (South Africa) D Visser | 7 | 7
(Socialist Federal Republic of Yugoslavia) Z Franulović | 6 | 6
(Czechoslovakia) J Granát | 7 | 7
(Austria) H Kary | 3 | 1
8 | (United States) M De Palmer | 6 | 6

Second round
1 | (United States) V Van Patten | 7 | 6
(United States) M Vines | 5 | 4
(France) J Piacentile | 6 | 5
(South Africa) B Mitton | 7 | 7
4 | (Bolivia) M Martinez | 4 | 6 | 7
Q | (South Africa) D Visser | 6 | 4 | 6
(Czechoslovakia) J Granát | 4 | 7 | 6
8 | (United States) M De Palmer | 6 | 5 | 7

Quarterfinals
1 | (United States) V Van Patten | 3 | 3
(South Africa) B Mitton | 6 | 6
4 | (Bolivia) M Martinez | 4 | 3
8 | (United States) M De Palmer | 6 | 6

Semifinals
(South Africa) B Mitton | 7 | 1 | 3
8 | (United States) M De Palmer | 5 | 6 | 6

=== Section 2 ===
First round
5 | (Italy) C Barazzutti | 7 | 6
(France) J Potier | 6 | 0
(United States) T Gullikson | 5 | 6 | 7
(Germany) K Meiler | 7 | 3 | 6
(France) C Freyss | 7 | 4 | 3
(Sweden) J Gunnarsson | 6 | 6 | 6
(Spain) M Mir | 6 | 2 | 4
3 | (Sweden) A Järryd | 4 | 6 | 6
7 | (Sweden) M Tideman | 3 | 4
Q | (Germany) C Zipf | 6 | 6
(Austria) R Reininger | 6 | 6
Q | (Italy) G Possamai | 3 | 4
(Socialist Federal Republic of Yugoslavia) M Ostoja | 6 | 6
Q | (Austria) H Kandler | 1 | 1
(Sweden) J Nyström | 6 | 4
2 | (Sweden) H Simonsson | 7 | 6

Second round
5 | (Italy) C Barazzutti | 4 | 6 | 6
(United States) T Gullikson | 6 | 3 | 7
(Sweden) J Gunnarsson | 1 | 3
3 | (Sweden) A Järryd | 6 | 6
Q | (Germany) C Zipf | 5 | 6 | 6
(Austria) R Reininger | 7 | 3 | 4
(Socialist Federal Republic of Yugoslavia) M Ostoja | 1 | 6 | 3
2 | (Sweden) H Simonsson | 6 | 3 | 6

Quarterfinals
(United States) T Gullikson | 5 | 0
3 | (Sweden) A Järryd | 7 | 6
Q | (Germany) C Zipf | 4 | 4
2 | (Sweden) H Simonsson | 6 | 6

Semifinals
3 | (Sweden) A Järryd | 6 | 5 | 7
2 | (Sweden) H Simonsson | 2 | 7 | 6
