= 1982 Swedish Open – Singles =

Singles
- 1982 Swedish Open

Final
- Champion: (Sweden) Mats Wilander
- Runner-up: (Sweden) Henrik Sundström
- Score: 6–4, 6–4

Details
- Draw: 32
- Seeds: 8

Events
Singles	Doubles
- Swedish Open

Thierry Tulasne was the defending champion, but was forced to retire in his first round match against Gustavo Tiberti.

Mats Wilander won the title by defeating Henrik Sundström 6–4, 6–4 in the final.

== Seeds ==
1. (Sweden) Mats Wilander (champion)
2. (Sweden) Anders Järryd (first round)
3. (France) Thierry Tulasne (first round, retired)
4. (Australia) Chris Johnstone (second round)
5. (Spain) José López-Maeso (quarterfinals)
6. (Sweden) Joakim Nyström (first round)
7. (Australia) John Fitzgerald (first round)
8. (Finland) Leo Palin (first round)

== Draw ==
Key

- Q = Qualifier
- WC = Wild card
- LL = Lucky loser
- Alt = Alternate
- ITF = ITF entry
- PR = Protected ranking
- SR = Special ranking
- SE = Special exempt
- JE = Junior exempt
- JR = Junior Accelerator Programme entrant
- CO = College Accelerator Programme entrant
- NG = Next Gen Accelerator Program entrant
- w/o = Walkover
- r = Retired
- d = Defaulted

=== Finals ===
Semifinals
1	(Sweden) Mats Wilander	7	6
Q	(Argentina) Gustavo Tiberti	6	3
(Sweden) Thomas Högstedt	2	4
(Sweden) Henrik Sundström	6	6

Final
1	(Sweden) Mats Wilander	6	6
(Sweden) Henrik Sundström	4	4

=== Top half ===
First round
1	(Sweden) M Wilander	2	6	6
(Sweden) J Gunnarsson	6	2	3
(Sweden) S Simonsson	6	7
(Switzerland) R Stadler	3	6
(Sweden) H Simonsson	3	6
(Belgium) B Boileau	6	7
(Bolivia) R Benavides	2	1
5	(Spain) J Lopez-Maeso	6	6
3	(France) T Tulasne	2	1^{r}
Q	(Argentina) G Tiberti	6	4
(West Germany) H Theissen	1	4
(United Kingdom) J Smith	6	6
Q	(Sweden) M Tideman	1	6
(West Germany) K Meiler	6	7
Q	(Sweden) C-A Hageskog	7	6
7	(Australia) J Fitzgerald	5	3

Second round
1	(Sweden) M Wilander	6	7
(Sweden) S Simonsson	3	5
(Belgium) B Boileau	5	1
5	(Spain) J Lopez-Maeso	7	6
Q	(Argentina) G Tiberti	6	6
(United Kingdom) J Smith	2	1
(West Germany) K Meiler	7	2	3
Q	(Sweden) C-A Hageskog	5	6	6

Quarterfinals
1	(Sweden) M Wilander	6	4	6
5	(Spain) J Lopez-Maeso	2	6	2
Q	(Argentina) G Tiberti	6	6
Q	(Sweden) C-A Hageskog	3	3

Semifinals
1	(Sweden) M Wilander	7	6
Q	(Argentina) G Tiberti	6	3

=== Bottom half ===
First round
8	(Finland) L Palin	0	2
(Argentina) C Castellan	6	6
(Colombia) A Cortés	7	7
(South Africa) B Pirow	6	6
Q	(Sweden) S Svensson	6	4	0
(Sweden) T Hogstedt	4	6	6
(Australia) G Whitecross	4	3
4	(Australia) C Johnstone	6	6
6	(Sweden) J Nyström	2	6	1
(Sweden) P Hjertquist	6	3	6
(Australia) C Letcher	1	3
(Sweden) H Sundström	6	6
(Switzerland) I Dupasquier	6	6
(South Africa) R Moore	4	1
(New Zealand) B Derlin	6	6
2	(Sweden) A Järryd	2	4

Second round
(Argentina) C Castellan	4	6	4
(Colombia) A Cortés	6	2	6
(Sweden) T Hogstedt	2	6	6
4	(Australia) C Johnstone	6	3	4
(Sweden) P Hjertquist	4	4
(Sweden) H Sundström	6	6
(Switzerland) I Dupasquier	3	2
(New Zealand) B Derlin	6	6

Quarterfinals
(Colombia) A Cortés	6	3	0
(Sweden) T Hogstedt	4	6	6
(Sweden) H Sundström	7	6
(New Zealand) B Derlin	6	1

Semifinals
(Sweden) T Hogstedt	2	4
(Sweden) H Sundström	6	6
