= 1982 Swedish Open =

- Date: 12–19 July
- Edition: 35th
- Category: Grand Prix
- Draw: 32S / 16D
- Prize money: $75,000
- Surface: Clay / outdoor
- Location: Båstad, Sweden

Champions

Singles
- (Sweden) Mats Wilander

Doubles
- (Sweden) Anders Järryd / (Sweden) Hans Simonsson
← 1981 ·	Swedish Open	· 1983 →

The 1982 Swedish Open was a men's professional tennis tournament played on outdoor clay courts and held in Båstad, Sweden. It was part of the 1982 Grand Prix circuit. It was the 35th edition of the tournament and was held from 12 July through 19 July 1982. First-seeded Mats Wilander won the singles title.

== Finals ==
=== Singles ===
(Sweden) Mats Wilander defeated (Sweden) Henrik Sundström 6–4, 6–4

- It was Wilander's 2nd singles title of the year and of his career.

=== Doubles ===
(Sweden) Anders Järryd / (Sweden) Hans Simonsson defeated (Sweden) Joakim Nyström / (Sweden) Mats Wilander 0–6, 6–3, 7–6
