= 1985 Custom Credit Australian Indoor Championships – Singles =

Singles
- 1985 Custom Credit Australian Indoor Championships

Final
- Champion: (Czechoslovakia) Ivan Lendl
- Runner-up: (France) Henri Leconte
- Score: 6–4, 6–4, 7–6

Details
- Draw: 32
- Seeds: 8

Events
| Singles | Doubles |
| ← 1984 · | Australian Indoor Tennis Championships | · 1986 → |

Anders Järryd was the defending champion but lost in the first round to Bud Schultz.

Ivan Lendl won in the final 6–4, 6–4, 7–6 against Henri Leconte.

== Seeds ==
1. (Czechoslovakia) Ivan Lendl (champion)
2. (Sweden) Anders Järryd (first round)
3. (Ecuador) Andrés Gómez (quarterfinals)
4. (United States) Paul Annacone (semifinals)
5. (France) Henri Leconte (final)
6. (United States) Ben Testerman (quarterfinals)
7. (United States) John Sadri (first round)
8. (Australia) John Fitzgerald (semifinals)

== Draw ==
=== Key ===
- Q = Qualifier
- WC = Wild card
- LL = Lucky loser
- Alt = Alternate
- SE = Special exempt
- PR = Protected ranking
- ITF = ITF entry
- JE = Junior exempt
- w/o = Walkover
- r = Retired
- d = Defaulted
- SR = Special ranking

=== Finals ===
Semifinals
1 | (Czechoslovakia) Ivan Lendl | 6 | 6
4 | (United States) Paul Annacone | 4 | 3
5 | (France) Henri Leconte | 6 | 6
8 | (Australia) John Fitzgerald | 3 | 2

Final
1 | (Czechoslovakia) Ivan Lendl | 6 | 6 | 7
5 | (France) Henri Leconte | 4 | 4 | 6

=== Section 1 ===
First round
1 | (Czechoslovakia) I Lendl | 6 | 6
Q | (Australia) C Miller | 0 | 4
(Australia) B Drewett | 2 | 4
(United States) L Bourne | 6 | 6
Q | (United States) T Nelson | 7 | 6
(Paraguay) F González | 5 | 3
WC | (Australia) J Alexander | 3 | 2
6 | (United States) B Testerman | 6 | 6
4 | (United States) P Annacone | 6 | 6
(Nigeria) N Odizor | 3 | 3
(New Zealand) K Evernden | 6 | 6 | 7
(United States) T Moor | 4 | 7 | 5
(Australia) M Edmondson | 3 | 4
(United States) M Bauer | 6 | 6
(United States) C Hooper | 7 | 6
7 | (United States) J Sadri | 6 | 3

Second round
1 | (Czechoslovakia) I Lendl | 7 | 6
(United States) L Bourne | 6 | 1
Q | (United States) T Nelson | 4 | 7 | 4
6 | (United States) B Testerman | 6 | 6 | 6
4 | (United States) P Annacone | 6 | 7
(New Zealand) K Evernden | 3 | 6
(United States) M Bauer | 4 | 4
(United States) C Hooper | 6 | 6

Quarterfinals
1 | (Czechoslovakia) I Lendl | 6 | 6
6 | (United States) B Testerman | 3 | 1
4 | (United States) P Annacone | 4 | 6 | 6
(United States) C Hooper | 6 | 3 | 4

Semifinals
1 | (Czechoslovakia) I Lendl | 6 | 6
4 | (United States) P Annacone | 4 | 3

=== Section 2 ===
First round
5 | (France) H Leconte | 4 | 6 | 6
(Australia) W Masur | 6 | 4 | 3
(Australia) P Doohan | 1 | 2
(United States) B Teacher | 6 | 6
WC | (Australia) D Cahill | 1 | 7 | 6
SE | (United States) G Layendecker | 6 | 5 | 2
(United States) M Mitchell | 3 | 6 | 5
WC/3 | (Ecuador) A Gómez | 6 | 3 | 7
8 | (Australia) J Fitzgerald | 6 | 6
LL | (United States) T Cain | 4 | 1
Q | (Australia) M Jeffrey | 2 | 1
(United States) M Davis | 6 | 6
Q | (Australia) D Macpherson | 6 | 7 | 4
(Australia) S Youl | 7 | 6 | 6
(United States) B Schultz | 6 | 6
2 | (Sweden) A Järryd | 4 | 4

Second round
5 | (France) H Leconte | 7 | 4 | 7
(United States) B Teacher | 6 | 6 | 6
WC | (Australia) D Cahill | 0 | 2
WC/3 | (Ecuador) A Gómez | 6 | 6
8 | (Australia) J Fitzgerald | 5 | 6 | 6
(United States) M Davis | 7 | 2 | 3
(Australia) S Youl | 6 | 6 | 6
(United States) B Schultz | 7 | 3 | 4

Quarterfinals
5 | (France) H Leconte | 6 | 6
WC/3 | (Ecuador) A Gómez | 4 | 4
8 | (Australia) J Fitzgerald | 7 | 6 | 6
(Australia) S Youl | 6 | 7 | 3

Semifinals
5 | (France) H Leconte | 6 | 6
8 | (Australia) J Fitzgerald | 3 | 2
