= 1986 Swan Premium Open – Singles =

Singles
- 1986 Swan Premium Open

Final
- Champion: (West Germany) Boris Becker
- Runner-up: (Czechoslovakia) Ivan Lendl
- Score: 3–6, 7–6, 6–2, 6–0

Details
- Draw: 32
- Seeds: 8

Events
Singles	Doubles
← 1985 ·	Australian Indoor Tennis Championships	· 1987 →

Ivan Lendl was the defending champion but lost in the final 3–6, 7–6, 6–2, 6–0 to Boris Becker.

== Seeds ==
1. (Czechoslovakia) Ivan Lendl (final)
2. (West Germany) Boris Becker (champion)
3. n/a
4. (Australia) Paul McNamee (first round)
5. (United States) Marcel Freeman (quarterfinals)
6. (South Africa) Christo van Rensburg (first round)
7. (United States) Mike Leach (second round)
8. (Australia) Wally Masur (quarterfinals)

== Draw ==
=== Key ===
- Q = Qualifier
- WC = Wild card
- LL = Lucky loser
- Alt = Alternate
- SE = Special exempt
- PR = Protected ranking
- ITF = ITF entry
- JE = Junior exempt
- w/o = Walkover
- r = Retired
- d = Defaulted
- SR = Special ranking

=== Finals ===
Semifinals
1	(Czechoslovakia) Ivan Lendl	7	6
(Australia) Pat Cash	5	2
(United States) Glenn Layendecker	4	4
2	(West Germany) Boris Becker	6	6

Final
1	(Czechoslovakia) Ivan Lendl	6	6	2	0
2	(West Germany) Boris Becker	3	7	6	6

=== Section 1 ===
First round
1	(Czechoslovakia) I Lendl	6	6
(Australia) M Kratzmann	4	2
(South Africa) B Levine	6	5	2
Q	(Australia) P Carter	3	7	6
Q	(Australia) S Furlong	3	7	7
WC	(Australia) S Barr	6	6	5
(Australia) L Warder	2	5
8	(Australia) W Masur	6	7
LL	(Australia) B Custer	1	2
WC	(Australia) P McNamara	6	6
Q	(Australia) A Lane	4	6	1
Q	(United States) C Stansbury	6	2	6
(Australia) C Miller	3	4
(Australia) P Cash	6	6
(Australia) B Drewett	7	6
6	(South Africa) C van Rensburg	6	1

Second round
1	(Czechoslovakia) I Lendl	6	6
Q	(Australia) P Carter	4	4
Q	(Australia) S Furlong	1	2
8	(Australia) W Masur	6	6
WC	(Australia) P McNamara	6	6
Q	(United States) C Stansbury	7	7
(Australia) P Cash	6	6
(Australia) B Drewett	4	4

Quarterfinals
1	(Czechoslovakia) I Lendl	6	6
8	(Australia) W Masur	2	2
Q	(United States) C Stansbury	3	2
(Australia) P Cash	6	6

Semifinals
1	(Czechoslovakia) I Lendl	7	6
(Australia) P Cash	5	2

=== Section 2 ===
First round
5	(United States) M Freeman	6	6
(United States) T Nelson	2	4
(Australia) M Edmondson	6	6
(Australia) P Doohan	2	3
(Australia) D Cahill	6	6
(United States) T Warneke	2	4
(United States) G Layendecker	6	6
4	(Australia) P McNamee	1	3
7	(United States) M Leach	6	7
(Nigeria) T Mmoh	4	6
(Australia) B Dyke	7	6
WC	(Australia) M Woodforde	6	1
(United States) C Hooper	6	1
(Australia) J Fitzgerald	7	6
(South Africa) D Maasdorp	1	3
2	(West Germany) B Becker	6	6

Second round
5	(United States) M Freeman	6	7
(Australia) M Edmondson	2	5
(Australia) D Cahill	5	4
(United States) G Layendecker	7	6
7	(United States) M Leach	3	3
(Australia) B Dyke	6	6
(Australia) J Fitzgerald	4	5
2	(West Germany) B Becker	6	7

Quarterfinals
5	(United States) M Freeman	3	2
(United States) G Layendecker	6	6
(Australia) B Dyke	4	4
2	(West Germany) B Becker	6	6

Semifinals
(United States) G Layendecker	4	4
2	(West Germany) B Becker	6	6
