= 1984 Custom Credit Australian Indoor Championships =

- Date: 8–14 October
- Edition: 12th
- Draw: 32S / 16D
- Prize money: $225,000
- Surface: Hard / indoor
- Location: Sydney, Australia
- Venue: Sydney Entertainment Centre

Champions

Singles
- (Sweden) Anders Järryd

Doubles
- (Sweden) Anders Järryd / (Sweden) Hans Simonsson
- Australian Indoor Tennis Championships

The 1984 Custom Credit Australian Indoor Championships was a men's tennis tournament played on indoor hard courts at the Sydney Entertainment Centre in Sydney in Australia and was part of the 1984 Volvo Grand Prix. The tournament ran from 8 October through 14 October 1984. Second-seeded Anders Järryd won the singles title.

== Finals ==
=== Singles ===
(Sweden) Anders Järryd defeated (Czechoslovakia) Ivan Lendl 6–3, 6–2, 6–4

- It was Järryd's 2nd singles title of the year and the 4th of his career.

=== Doubles ===
(Sweden) Anders Järryd / (Sweden) Hans Simonsson defeated (Australia) Mark Edmondson / (United States) Sherwood Stewart 6–4, 6–4

- It was Järryd's 6th title of the year and the 19th of his career. It was Simonsson's 2nd title of the year and the 11th of his career.
