= 1982 Ancona Open – Doubles =

Doubles
- 1982 Ancona Open

Final
- Champions: (Sweden) Anders Järryd (Sweden) Hans Simonsson
- Runners-up: (United States) Tim Gullikson (South Africa) Bernard Mitton
- Score: 6–4, 6–3

Events
Singles	Doubles
- Ancona Open

Anders Järryd and Hans Simonsson won the title by defeating Tim Gullikson and Bernard Mitton 6–4, 6–3 in the final.

== Seeds ==
1. (Sweden) Anders Järryd / (Sweden) Hans Simonsson (champions)
2. (United States) Tim Gullikson / (South Africa) Bernard Mitton (final)
3. (Sweden) Jan Gunnarsson / (Sweden) Magnus Tideman (semifinals)
4. (Italy) Gianni Marchetti / (Italy) Enzo Vattuone (semifinals)

== Draw ==
Key

- Q = Qualifier
- WC = Wild card
- LL = Lucky loser
- Alt = Alternate
- ITF = ITF entry
- PR = Protected ranking
- SR = Special ranking
- SE = Special exempt
- JE = Junior exempt
- JR = Junior Accelerator Programme entrant
- CO = College Accelerator Programme entrant
- NG = Next Gen Accelerator Program entrant
- w/o = Walkover
- r = Retired
- d = Defaulted

=== Draw ===
First round
1	(Sweden) A Järryd (Sweden) H Simonsson	6	6
(United States) M De Palmer (United States) M Vines	3	3
(Italy) C Barazzutti (Socialist Federal Republic of Yugoslavia) Z Franulovic	7	6
(Italy) E Artaldi (Italy) M Narducci	5	4
(France) J-M Piacentile (Chile) A Pierola	6	6
(Italy) M Grassotti (Italy) R Ricci Bitti	3	2
(United States) R Druz (Socialist Federal Republic of Yugoslavia) M Ostoja	7	6
(Bolivia) M Martinez (Spain) M Mir	5	3
4	(Italy) G Marchetti (Italy) E Vattuone	7	6
(Italy) P Parrini (Italy) G Rinaldini	6	4
(Czechoslovakia) J Granat (Austria) R Reininger	6	6
(Italy) M Armellini (Italy) G Possamai	3	2

Quarterfinals
1	(Sweden) A Järryd (Sweden) H Simonsson	6	6
(Italy) C Barazzutti (Socialist Federal Republic of Yugoslavia) Z Franulovic	1	1
3	(Sweden) J Gunnarsson (Sweden) M Tideman	6	6
(France) J-M Piacentile (Chile) A Pierola	3	4
(United States) R Druz (Socialist Federal Republic of Yugoslavia) M Ostoja	6	4
4	(Italy) G Marchetti (Italy) E Vattuone	7	6
(Czechoslovakia) J Granat (Austria) R Reininger	7	2	3
2	(United States) T Gullikson (South Africa) B Mitton	6	6	6

Semifinals
1	(Sweden) A Järryd (Sweden) H Simonsson	6	6
3	(Sweden) J Gunnarsson (Sweden) M Tideman	4	3
4	(Italy) G Marchetti (Italy) E Vattuone	6	5
2	(United States) T Gullikson (South Africa) B Mitton	7	7

Final
1	(Sweden) A Järryd (Sweden) H Simonsson	4	6	7
2	(United States) T Gullikson (South Africa) B Mitton	6	3	6
