= 1984 Custom Credit Australian Indoor Championships – Singles =

Singles
- 1984 Custom Credit Australian Indoor Championships

Final
- Champion: (Sweden) Anders Järryd
- Runner-up: (Czechoslovakia) Ivan Lendl
- Score: 6–3, 6–2, 6–4

Details
- Draw: 32
- Seeds: 8

Events
Singles	Doubles
← 1983 ·	Australian Indoor Tennis Championships	· 1985 →

John McEnroe was the defending champion but did not compete that year.

Anders Järryd won in the final 6–3, 6–2, 6–4 against Ivan Lendl.

== Seeds ==
1. (Czechoslovakia) Ivan Lendl (final)
2. (Sweden) Anders Järryd (champion)
3. (Australia) Pat Cash (first round)
4. (United States) Eliot Teltscher (semifinals)
5. (Australia) Paul McNamee (second round)
6. (United States) Peter Fleming (quarterfinals)
7. n/a
8. (Australia) John Fitzgerald (second round)

== Draw ==
=== Key ===
- Q = Qualifier
- WC = Wild card
- LL = Lucky loser
- Alt = Alternate
- SE = Special exempt
- PR = Protected ranking
- ITF = ITF entry
- JE = Junior exempt
- w/o = Walkover
- r = Retired
- d = Defaulted
- SR = Special ranking

=== Finals ===
Semifinals
1	(Czechoslovakia) Ivan Lendl	6	6
4	(United States) Eliot Teltscher	1	1
(United States) Ben Testerman	6	2	6
2	(Sweden) Anders Järryd	2	6	7

Final
1	(Czechoslovakia) Ivan Lendl	3	2	4
2	(Sweden) Anders Järryd	6	6	6

=== Section 1 ===
First round
1	(Czechoslovakia) I Lendl	6	6
(Australia) W Masur	2	2
(New Zealand) C Lewis	7	3	4
(United States) G Layendecker	6	6	6
(Australia) J Frawley	6	6
(Australia) B Dyke	4	3
Q	(United States) R Nixon	3	4
6	(United States) P Fleming	6	6
4	(United States) E Teltscher	7	6	6
(United States) D Saltz	6	7	1
(United States) L Bourne	6	4	7
(Australia) M Kratzmann	3	6	5
(Australia) B Drewett	6	6
(United States) C Hooper	4	2
(United States) M Freeman	6	6	7
LL	(United States) L Shiras	4	7	5

Second round
1	(Czechoslovakia) I Lendl	6	6
(United States) G Layendecker	3	3
(Australia) J Frawley	5	7	3
6	(United States) P Fleming	7	5	6
4	(United States) E Teltscher	6	6
(United States) L Bourne	1	3
(Australia) B Drewett	3	6	7
(United States) M Freeman	6	1	5

Quarterfinals
1	(Czechoslovakia) I Lendl	6	6
6	(United States) P Fleming	4	2
4	(United States) E Teltscher	6	6
(Australia) B Drewett	3	0

Semifinals
1	(Czechoslovakia) I Lendl	6	6
4	(United States) E Teltscher	1	1

=== Section 2 ===
First round
5	(Australia) P McNamee	6	7
(New Zealand) R Simpson	4	6
Q	(United States) R Knapp	4	0
(United States) M De Palmer	6	6
(Australia) M Edmondson	6	4	4
(Sweden) H Simonsson	0	6	6
(United States) B Testerman	7	4	6
3	(Australia) P Cash	6	6	4
8	(Australia) J Fitzgerald	4	6	6
Q	(United States) J Canter	6	4	3
Q	(Australia) C Johnstone	1	4
(India) V Amritraj	6	6
(United States) M Leach	6	3	7
(Australia) S Youl	3	6	6
(Australia) J Alexander	1	1
2	(Sweden) A Järryd	6	6

Second round
5	(Australia) P McNamee	4	5
(United States) M De Palmer	6	7
(Sweden) H Simonsson	2	5
(United States) B Testerman	6	7
8	(Australia) J Fitzgerald	4	6
(India) V Amritraj	6	7
(United States) M Leach	6	4
2	(Sweden) A Järryd	7	6

Quarterfinals
(United States) M De Palmer	3	2
(United States) B Testerman	6	6
(India) V Amritraj	1	2
2	(Sweden) A Järryd	6	6

Semifinals
(United States) B Testerman	6	2	6
2	(Sweden) A Järryd	2	6	7
