= 1986 Volvo U.S. Indoor Championships =

- Date: February 3–10
- Edition: 16th
- Category: Grand Prix
- Draw: 48S / 24D
- Prize money: $250,000
- Surface: Carpet / indoor
- Location: Memphis, TN, U.S.
- Venue: Racquet Club of Memphis

Champions

Singles
- (United States) Brad Gilbert

Doubles
- (United States) Ken Flach / (United States) Robert Seguso
- U.S. National Indoor Championships

The 1986 Volvo U.S. Indoor Championships was a men's tennis tournament played on indoor carpet courts at the Racquet Club of Memphis in Memphis, Tennessee in the United States that was part of the 1986 Nabisco Grand Prix. It was the 16th edition of the tournament was held from February 3 through February 10, 1986. Eighth-seeded Brad Gilbert won the singles title and earned $45,000 first-prize money.

== Finals ==
=== Singles ===
(United States) Brad Gilbert defeated (Sweden) Stefan Edberg 7–5, 7–6^{(7–3)}

- It was Gilbert's 1st singles title of the year and the 7th of his career.

=== Doubles ===
(United States) Ken Flach / (United States) Robert Seguso defeated (France) Guy Forget / (Sweden) Anders Järryd 6–4, 4–6, 7–6^{(7–5)}
