= 1986 Volvo U.S. Indoor Championships – Singles =

Singles
- 1986 Volvo U.S. Indoor Championships

Final
- Champion: (United States) Brad Gilbert
- Runner-up: (Sweden) Stefan Edberg
- Score: 7–5, 7–6^{(7–3)}

Details
- Draw: 48 (4WC/6Q/1LL)
- Seeds: 16

Events
Singles	Doubles
- U.S. National Indoor Championships

Defending champion Stefan Edberg lost in the final to Brad Gilbert. The score was 7–5, 7–6^{(7–3)}

== Seeds ==
All seeds received a bye to the second round.

1. (United States) Jimmy Connors (quarterfinals)
2. (Sweden) Stefan Edberg (final)
3. (Sweden) Anders Järryd (semifinals)
4. (United States) Kevin Curren (quarterfinals)
5. (n/a)
6. (United States) Paul Annacone (quarterfinals)
7. (United States) Johan Kriek (quarterfinals)
8. (United States) Brad Gilbert (champion)
9. (Czechoslovakia) Tomáš Šmíd (second round)
10. (United States) Jimmy Arias (second round)
11. (France) Thierry Tulasne (second round)
12. (Sweden) Jan Gunnarsson (second round)
13. (United States) David Pate (third round)
14. (United States) Greg Holmes (third round)
15. (United States) Matt Anger (third round)
16. (Sweden) Peter Lundgren (third round)

== Draw ==
Key

- Q = Qualifier
- WC = Wild card
- LL = Lucky loser
- Alt = Alternate
- ITF = ITF entry
- PR = Protected ranking
- SR = Special ranking
- SE = Special exempt
- JE = Junior exempt
- JR = Junior Accelerator Programme entrant
- CO = College Accelerator Programme entrant
- NG = Next Gen Accelerator Program entrant
- w/o = Walkover
- r = Retired
- d = Defaulted

=== Finals ===
Quarterfinals
1	(United States) Jimmy Connors	6	4	4
8	(United States) Brad Gilbert	3	6	6
3	(Sweden) Anders Järryd	7	7
6	(United States) Paul Annacone	6	5
Q	(Sweden) Mikael Pernfors	6	6
4	(United States) Kevin Curren	4	2
7	(United States) Johan Kriek	3	2
2	(Sweden) Stefan Edberg	6	6

Semifinals
8	(United States) Brad Gilbert	6	6
3	(Sweden) Anders Järryd	3	0
Q	(Sweden) Mikael Pernfors	6	5	1
2	(Sweden) Stefan Edberg	4	7	6

Final
8	(United States) Brad Gilbert	7	7^{7}
2	(Sweden) Stefan Edberg	5	6^{3}

=== Top half ===
==== Section 1 ====
First round
WC	(United States) T Moor	6	4	4
(India) R Krishnan	3	6	6
Q	(Czechoslovakia) P Složil	7	3	6
(France) G Forget	5	6	3
(United States) M Davis	3	7	6
Q	(New Zealand) K Evernden	6	6	3
(United States) B Schultz	4	3
(United States) J Sadri	6	6

Second round
1	(United States) J Connors	1	6	7
(India) R Krishnan	6	1	6
Q	(Czechoslovakia) P Složil	6	6	3
15	(United States) M Anger	4	7	6
10	(United States) J Arias	6	3	5
(United States) M Davis	4	6	7
(United States) J Sadri	6	2
8	(United States) B Gilbert	7	6

Third round
1	(United States) J Connors	6	6
15	(United States) M Anger	4	2
(United States) M Davis	5	4
8	(United States) B Gilbert	7	6

Quarterfinals
1	(United States) J Connors	6	4	4
8	(United States) B Gilbert	3	6	6

==== Section 2 ====
First round
(Chile) R Acuña	3	0
(United States) T Wilkison	6	6
WC	(United States) S Denton	5	6	7
(Switzerland) J Hlasek	7	3	6
WC	(United States) B Testerman	4	2
(United Kingdom) J Lloyd	6	6
(United States) To Gullikson	2	1
(Czechoslovakia) M Vajda	6	6

Second round
3	(Sweden) A Järryd	6	6
(United States) T Wilkison	2	4
WC	(United States) S Denton	4	6	6
14	(United States) G Holmes	6	3	7
12	(Sweden) J Gunnarsson	1	2
(United Kingdom) J Lloyd	6	6
(Czechoslovakia) M Vajda	1	3
6	(United States) P Annacone	6	6

Third round
3	(Sweden) A Järryd	6	7
14	(United States) G Holmes	4	6
(United Kingdom) J Lloyd	6	4
6	(United States) P Annacone	7	6

Quarterfinals
3	(Sweden) A Järryd	7	7
6	(United States) P Annacone	6	5

=== Bottom half ===
==== Section 3 ====
First round
(Spain) S Casal	1	3
(United States) S Giammalva Jr.	6	6
(United States) K Flach	7	4	2
Q	(Sweden) M Pernfors	5	6	6
Q	(Socialist Federal Republic of Yugoslavia) M Ostoja	6	4	7
Q	(United States) G Donnelly	4	6	5
WC	(United States) M Purcell	7	6
(United States) R Seguso	5	0

Second round
LL	(United States) T Warneke	4	2
(United States) S Giammalva Jr.	6	6
Q	(Sweden) M Pernfors	2	6	6
8	(France) T Tulasne	6	4	1
13	(United States) D Pate	6	6
Q	(Socialist Federal Republic of Yugoslavia) M Ostoja	2	3
WC	(United States) M Purcell	4	7	1
4	(United States) K Curren	6	6	6

Third round
(United States) S Giammalva Jr.	3	3
Q	(Sweden) M Pernfors	6	6
13	(United States) D Pate	4	4
4	(United States) K Curren	6	6

Quarterfinals
Q	(Sweden) M Pernfors	6	6
4	(United States) K Curren	4	2

==== Section 4 ====
First round
(Spain) E Sánchez	3	7	6
(United States) L Stefanki	6	6	7
(Czechoslovakia) L Pimek	4	2
(West Germany) M Westphal	6	6
(United States) L Duncan	6	7
Q	(Netherlands) T Nijssen	2	6
(United States) M Leach	7	6
(Argentina) H de la Peña	5	4

Second round
7	(United States) J Kriek	6	6
(United States) L Stefanki	3	1
(West Germany) M Westphal	7	4	7
24	(Czechoslovakia) T Šmíd	6	6	6
16	(Sweden) P Lundgren	6	6	6
(United States) L Duncan	3	7	3
(United States) M Leach	4	1^{r}
2	(Sweden) S Edberg	6	0

Third round
7	(United States) J Kriek	6	2	6
(West Germany) M Westphal	3	6	3
16	(Sweden) P Lundgren	1	2
2	(Sweden) S Edberg	6	6

Quarterfinals
7	(United States) J Kriek	3	2
2	(Sweden) S Edberg	6	6
