= 1981 Dutch Open (tennis) =

- Date: 20–26 July
- Edition: 24th
- Category: Grand Prix
- Draw: 32S / 16D
- Prize money: $75,000
- Surface: Clay / outdoor
- Location: Hilversum, Netherlands
- Venue: 't Melkhuisje

Champions

Singles
- (Hungary) Balázs Taróczy

Doubles
- (Switzerland) Heinz Günthardt / (Hungary) Balázs Taróczy
- Dutch Open

The 1981 Dutch Open was a Grand Prix tennis tournament staged in Hilversum, Netherlands. The tournament was played on outdoor clay courts and was held from 20 July until 26 July 1981. It was the 24th edition of the tournament. Balázs Taróczy won his fourth consecutive title at the event and his fifth in total.

== Finals ==
=== Singles ===
(Hungary) Balázs Taróczy defeated (Switzerland) Heinz Günthardt 6–3, 6–7, 6–4

=== Doubles ===
(Switzerland) Heinz Günthardt / (Hungary) Balázs Taróczy defeated (South Africa) Raymond Moore / (Zimbabwe) Andrew Pattison 6–0, 6–2
