= ATP Linz =

Men's tennis tournament

The ATP Linz is a defunct men's tennis tournament that was played on the Grand Prix tennis circuit in 1979, 1981 to 1982. The event was held in Linz, Austria and was played on various surfaces.

== Past finals ==
=== Singles ===
| Year | Champions | Runners-up | Score |
|---|---|---|---|
| 1979 | (Austria) Peter Feigl | (Austria) Hans Kary | 6–3, 6–4, 7–6 |
| 1980 | Not held | | |
| 1981 | (Italy) Gianni Ocleppo | (Australia) Mark Edmondson | 7–5, 6–1 |
| 1982 | (Sweden) Anders Järryd | (Spain) José Higueras | 6–4, 4–6, 6–4 |

=== Doubles ===
| Year | Champions | Runners-up | Score |
|---|---|---|---|
| 1979 | (France) Patrice Dominguez (France) Gilles Moretton | (Hungary) Szabolcz Baranyi (Hungary) Péter Szőke | 6–1, 6–4 |
| 1980 | Not held | | |
| 1981 | (Sweden) Anders Järryd (Sweden) Hans Simonsson | (Australia) Brad Drewett (Czechoslovakia) Pavel Složil | 6–4, 7–6 |
| 1982 | (Sweden) Anders Järryd (Sweden) Hans Simonsson | (Australia) Rod Frawley (Australia) Paul Kronk | 6–2, 6–0 |
