= 1986 Volvo U.S. Indoor Championships – Doubles =

Doubles
- 1986 Volvo U.S. Indoor Championships

Final
- Champions: (United States) Ken Flach (United States) Robert Seguso
- Runners-up: (France) Guy Forget (Sweden) Anders Järryd
- Score: 6–4, 4–6, 7–6^{(7–5)}

Details
- Draw: 24 (1WC)
- Seeds: 8

Events
Singles	Doubles
- U.S. National Indoor Championships

Pavel Složil and Tomáš Šmíd were the defending champions, but competed this year with different partners. Složil teamed up with Jakob Hlasek and lost in the quarterfinals to Paul Annacone and Sherwood Stewart, while Šmíd teamed up with John Fitzgerald and lost in the second round to Johan Kriek and John Lloyd.

Ken Flach and Robert Seguso won the title by defeating Guy Forget and Anders Järryd 6–4, 4–6, 7–6^{(7–5)} in the final.

== Seeds ==
All seeds received a bye to the second round.

1. (United States) Ken Flach / (United States) Robert Seguso (champions)
2. (France) Guy Forget / (Sweden) Anders Järryd (final)
3. (Australia) John Fitzgerald / (Czechoslovakia) Tomáš Šmíd (second round)
4. (United States) Paul Annacone / (United States) Sherwood Stewart (semifinals)
5. (Spain) Sergio Casal / (Spain) Emilio Sánchez (quarterfinals)
6. (Switzerland) Jakob Hlasek / (Czechoslovakia) Pavel Složil (quarterfinals)
7. (United States) Mike De Palmer / (United States) Gary Donnelly (quarterfinals)
8. (United States) Kevin Curren / (United States) Steve Denton (quarterfinals)

== Draw ==
Key

- Q = Qualifier
- WC = Wild card
- LL = Lucky loser
- Alt = Alternate
- ITF = ITF entry
- PR = Protected ranking
- SR = Special ranking
- SE = Special exempt
- JE = Junior exempt
- JR = Junior Accelerator Programme entrant
- CO = College Accelerator Programme entrant
- NG = Next Gen Accelerator Program entrant
- w/o = Walkover
- r = Retired
- d = Defaulted

=== Finals ===
Semifinals
1	(United States) Ken Flach (United States) Robert Seguso	6	6
4	(United States) Paul Annacone (United States) Sherwood Stewart	2	4
(United States) Johan Kriek (United Kingdom) John Lloyd	6	6	6
2	(France) Guy Forget (Sweden) Anders Järryd	3	7	7

Final
1	(United States) Ken Flach (United States) Robert Seguso	6	4	7^{7}
2	(France) Guy Forget (Sweden) Anders Järryd	4	6	6^{5}

=== Top half ===
First round
(United States) M Davis (United States) M Leach	6	7	2
(United States) B Gilbert (United States) T Wilkison	7	5	6
WC	(Sweden) M Pernfors (United States) B Schultz	7	1	6
(United States) M Purcell (United States) V Van Patten	6	6	1
(United States) To Gullikson (United States) L Stefanki	6	3	2
(United States) M Anger (United States) J Arias	2	6	6
(Sweden) J Gunnarsson (Denmark) M Mortensen	6	7	6
(Sweden) P Lundgren (Czechoslovakia) L Pimek	7	6	2

Second round
1	(United States) K Flach (United States) R Seguso	3	6	6
(United States) B Gilbert (United States) T Wilkison	6	4	3
WC	(Sweden) M Pernfors (United States) B Schultz
7	(United States) M De Palmer (United States) G Donnelly	w/o
4	(United States) P Annacone (United States) S Stewart	3	6	6
(United States) M Anger (United States) J Arias	6	3	4
(Sweden) J Gunnarsson (Denmark) M Mortensen	4	4
6	(Switzerland) J Hlasek (Czechoslovakia) P Složil	6	6

Quarterfinals
1	(United States) K Flach (United States) R Seguso	6	7
7	(United States) M De Palmer (United States) G Donnelly	4	6
4	(United States) P Annacone (United States) S Stewart	7	6	7
6	(Switzerland) J Hlasek (Czechoslovakia) P Složil	5	7	6

Semifinals
1	(United States) K Flach (United States) R Seguso	6	6
4	(United States) P Annacone (United States) S Stewart	2	4

=== Bottom half ===
First round
(Australia) D Graham (United States) B Testerman	4	2
(Chile) R Acuña (Netherlands) T Nijssen	6	6
(United States) J Kriek (United Kingdom) J Lloyd	2	7	6
(United States) E Fernandez (United States) D Pate	6	6	3
(South Africa) M Robertson (United States) T Warneke	6	6
(United States) S Mayer (United States) T Moor	1	4
(United States) S Giammalva Jr. (United States) G Holmes	6	6
(New Zealand) K Evernden (Australia) L Warder	7	7

Second round
5	(Spain) S Casal (Spain) E Sánchez	2	6	6
(Chile) R Acuña (Netherlands) T Nijssen	6	4	4
(United States) J Kriek (United Kingdom) J Lloyd	5	6	6
3	(Australia) J Fitzgerald (Czechoslovakia) T Šmíd	7	3	3
8	(United States) K Curren (United States) S Denton	2	7	7
(South Africa) M Robertson (United States) T Warneke	6	6	6
(New Zealand) K Evernden (Australia) L Warder	4	2
2	(France) G Forget (Sweden) A Järryd	6	6

Quarterfinals
5	(Spain) S Casal (Spain) E Sánchez	4	6	4
(United States) J Kriek (United Kingdom) J Lloyd	6	3	6
8	(United States) K Curren (United States) S Denton	3	7	5
2	(France) G Forget (Sweden) A Järryd	6	6	7

Semifinals
(United States) J Kriek (United Kingdom) J Lloyd	6	6	6
2	(France) G Forget (Sweden) A Järryd	3	7	7
