= Carl-Axel Hageskog =

Swedish tennis player and coach

- Country (sports): Sweden
- Residence: Växjö, Sweden
- Born: 24 May 1954 (age 70); Nässjö, Sweden
- Plays: Right-handed

Singles
- Career record: 2–2
- Career titles: 0
- Highest ranking: No. 398 (3 January 1983)

Doubles
- Career record: 0–1
- Highest ranking: No. 507 (3 January 1983)

Coaching career (1983–2002)
- Anders Järryd (1985–1994); Henrik Holm (1992–1993); Magnus Larsson (1994–2002)

Coaching achievements
- Coachee singles titles total: 8
- Coachee(s) doubles titles total: 46
- List of notable tournaments (with champion) WCT Finals (Järryd); Grand Slam Cup (Larsson); Australian Open Doubles (Järryd); French Open Doubles (Järryd – 1987, 1991); Wimbledon Doubles (Järryd – 1989, 1991); US Open Doubles (Järryd – 1987, 1991); Davis Cup (Järryd – 1987), (Larsson – 1994, 1997)

Carl-Axel Ivar Hageskog (born 24 May 1954) is a former Swedish tennis player, coach and professor in Sport Science, who captained Sweden to two Davis Cup victories.

== Tennis career ==
Educated with a degree in sports and exercise, Hageskog had a limited playing career and made his Grand Prix singles main draw debut at the 1979 Swedish Open as a qualifier, losing in the first round to the tournament eight seed Patrick Proisy. He also qualified for the 1982 Swedish Open and then defeated the tournament seventh seed, John Fitzgerald in the opening round, Karl Meiler in the second round and lost to Gustavo Tiberti in the quarterfinals.

== Coaching career ==
Hageskog was appointed as assistant coach with the Swedish Davis Cup team under the tenure of captain Hans Olsson in 1983. He continued in this role under Olsson's successor, John-Anders Sjögren from 1989 to 1994. At the start of 1995, Hageskog was appointed as Davis Cup captain, a position he held until the end of 2002. He captained Sweden to the finals of the Davis Cup in 1996, 1997 and 1998, winning the title in 1997 and 1998.

In 1985, Hageskog began coaching fellow Swede Anders Järryd and continued to do so for ten years. Järryd, who was already a top ten player, reached a career high ATP ranking of no. 5 in July 1985. During the course of their coaching partnership, Järryd was particularly successful in doubles and reached eleven Grand Slam doubles finals. In January 1992 Hageskog also began coaching Henrik Holm. At the time Holm had an ATP ranking of 130 and under Hageskog's guidance he reached a career high of no. 17 in July 1993.

After his coaching period with Järryd and Holm came to an end, Hageskog began coaching the world no. 39, Magnus Larsson. Under Hageskog, Larsson won the 1994 Grand Slam Cup, defeating world no.1 Pete Sampras in the final. Larsson reached his career high ranking of no. 10 in April 1995 and was a member of the victorious Swedish Davis Cup team in1997. Hageskog and Larsson continued to work together until the end of 2002.

In 2004 Hageskog was appointed professor at Linnaeus University in Växjö. In collaboration with former world no. 1, Stefan Edberg and Larsson, Hageskog started the Ready Play Tennis Academy in Växjö, a company for the development of young tennis players.
