= 1986 Swan Premium Open – Doubles =

Doubles
- 1986 Swan Premium Open

Final
- Champions: (West Germany) Boris Becker (Australia) John Fitzgerald
- Runners-up: (Australia) Peter McNamara (Australia) Paul McNamee
- Score: 6–4, 7–6

Details
- Draw: 16
- Seeds: 4

Events
Singles	Doubles
- Swan Premium Open

John Fitzgerald and Anders Järryd were the defending champions but only Fitzgerald competed that year with Boris Becker.

Becker and Fitzgerald won in the final 6–4, 7–6 against Peter McNamara and Paul McNamee.

== Seeds ==
1. (West Germany) Boris Becker / (Australia) John Fitzgerald (champions)
2. (Czechoslovakia) Ivan Lendl / (South Africa) Christo van Rensburg (quarterfinals)
3. (Australia) Mark Edmondson / (United States) Sherwood Stewart (quarterfinals)
4. (Australia) Brad Drewett / (Australia) Kim Warwick (semifinals)

== Draw ==
Key

- Q = Qualifier
- WC = Wild card
- LL = Lucky loser
- Alt = Alternate
- ITF = ITF entry
- PR = Protected ranking
- SR = Special ranking
- SE = Special exempt
- JE = Junior exempt
- JR = Junior Accelerator Programme entrant
- CO = College Accelerator Programme entrant
- NG = Next Gen Accelerator Program entrant
- w/o = Walkover
- r = Retired
- d = Defaulted

First round
1	(West Germany) B Becker (Australia) J Fitzgerald	6	6
(United States) M Freeman (United States) T Nelson	4	1
(Australia) P Cash (Australia) M Woodforde	6	6
(Australia) B Custer (Australia) D Macpherson	1	2
4	(Australia) B Drewett (Australia) K Warwick	6	6
(South Africa) B Levine (Nigeria) T Mmoh	2	3
(Australia) P Carter (Australia) D Tyson	4	6
(Australia) D Cahill (Australia) M Kratzmann	6	7
(Australia) B Dyke (Australia) W Masur	4	6	2
(Australia) P McNamara (Australia) P McNamee	6	3	6
(Australia) M Baroch (Australia) A Lane	2	3
3	(Australia) M Edmondson (United States) S Stewart	6	6
(South Africa) D Maasdorp (Australia) C Miller	3	3
(United States) G Layendecker (United States) T Warneke	6	6
(Australia) P Doohan (Australia) L Warder	6	3	4
2	(Czechoslovakia) I Lendl (South Africa) C van Rensburg	3	6	6

Quarterfinals
1	(West Germany) B Becker (Australia) J Fitzgerald	6	6
(Australia) P Cash (Australia) M Woodforde	3	3
4	(Australia) B Drewett (Australia) K Warwick	6	7
(Australia) D Cahill (Australia) M Kratzmann	4	6
(Australia) P McNamara (Australia) P McNamee	7	6
3	(Australia) M Edmondson (United States) S Stewart	6	1
(United States) G Layendecker (United States) T Warneke	6	5	6
2	(Czechoslovakia) I Lendl (South Africa) C van Rensburg	1	7	0

Semifinals
1	(West Germany) B Becker (Australia) J Fitzgerald	6	7
4	(Australia) B Drewett (Australia) K Warwick	4	6
(Australia) P McNamara (Australia) P McNamee	5	6	6
(United States) G Layendecker (United States) T Warneke	7	2	3

Final
1	(West Germany) B Becker (Australia) J Fitzgerald	6	7
(Australia) P McNamara (Australia) P McNamee	4	6
