= Cary Stansbury =

American tennis player

- Full name: Cary Stansbury
- Country (sports): United States
- Born: October 17, 1958 (age 66); California, U.S.
- Height: 6 ft 5 in (196 cm)
- Plays: Right-handed
- Prize money: $43,282

Singles
- Career record: 7–22

Grand Slam singles results
- Australian Open: 1R (1978)

Doubles
- Career record: 1–19

Grand Slam doubles results
- Australian Open: 1R (1978)

Cary Stansbury (born October 17, 1958) is a former professional tennis player from the United States.

== Biography ==
Stansbury grew up in the San Francisco Bay Area and played college tennis at UC Berkeley, earning ITA All-American honors in 1978.

Soon after turning professional he qualified for the main draw of the 1978 Australian Open and was beaten in the first round by four-time winner and seventh seed Ken Rosewall.

His best performance on the Grand Prix circuit came at the 1986 Sydney Indoor tournament, where he beat Peter McNamara en route to an appearance in the quarter-finals.
