= 1982 Swedish Open – Doubles =

Doubles
- 1982 Swedish Open

Final
- Champions: (Sweden) Anders Järryd (Sweden) Hans Simonsson
- Runners-up: (Sweden) Joakim Nyström (Sweden) Mats Wilander
- Score: 0–6, 6–3, 7–6

Events
Singles	Doubles
- Swedish Open

Mark Edmondson and John Fitzgerald were the defending champions, but Edmondson chose to compete at Stuttgart in the same week. Fitzgerald teamed up with Cliff Letcher and lost in the semifinals to Anders Järryd and Hans Simonsson.

Järryd and Simonsson won the title by defeating Joakim Nyström and Mats Wilander 0–6, 6–3, 7–6 in the final.

== Seeds ==
1. (Sweden) Anders Järryd / (Sweden) Hans Simonsson (champions)
2. (Switzerland) Markus Günthardt / (United Kingdom) Jonathan Smith (quarterfinals)
3. (Australia) John Fitzgerald / (Australia) Cliff Letcher (semifinals)
4. (Sweden) Jan Gunnarsson / (Sweden) Henrik Sundström (first round)

== Draw ==
Key

- Q = Qualifier
- WC = Wild card
- LL = Lucky loser
- Alt = Alternate
- ITF = ITF entry
- PR = Protected ranking
- SR = Special ranking
- SE = Special exempt
- JE = Junior exempt
- JR = Junior Accelerator Programme entrant
- CO = College Accelerator Programme entrant
- NG = Next Gen Accelerator Program entrant
- w/o = Walkover
- r = Retired
- d = Defaulted

=== Draw ===
First round
1	(Sweden) A Järryd (Sweden) H Simonsson	6	4	6
(Sweden) M Tideman (Sweden) J Windahl	2	6	4
(Switzerland) I Dupasquier (South Africa) R Moore	6	4	7
(Sweden) R Båthman (Sweden) P Larsson	4	6	6
(Argentina) C Castellan (South Africa) B Pirow	0	1
3	(Australia) J Fitzgerald (Australia) C Letcher	6	6
(Sweden) S Simonsson (Sweden) S Svensson	4	7	7
(New Zealand) B Derlin (Finland) L Palin	6	6	6
(Bolivia) R Benavides (Switzerland) R Stadler	6	7
(Sweden) C-A Hageskog (Australia) G Whitecross	4	6
4	(Sweden) J Gunnarsson (Sweden) H Sundström	4	0
(Sweden) P Hjertquist (Australia) C Johnstone	6	6
(Sweden) J Nyström (Sweden) M Wilander	7	7
(Colombia) A Cortés (Spain) J Lopez-Maeso	5	6
(West Germany) K Meiler (West Germany) H Theissen	4	6	6
2	(Switzerland) M Günthardt (United Kingdom) J Smith	6	3	7

Quarterfinals
1	(Sweden) A Järryd (Sweden) H Simonsson	6	7
(Switzerland) I Dupasquier (South Africa) R Moore	4	5
3	(Australia) J Fitzgerald (Australia) C Letcher	6	7
(Sweden) S Simonsson (Sweden) S Svensson	3	5
(Bolivia) R Benavides (Switzerland) R Stadler	2	4
(Sweden) P Hjertquist (Australia) C Johnstone	6	6
(Sweden) J Nyström (Sweden) M Wilander	6	6
2	(Switzerland) M Günthardt (United Kingdom) J Smith	2	4

Semifinals
1	(Sweden) A Järryd (Sweden) H Simonsson	6	6	6
3	(Australia) J Fitzgerald (Australia) C Letcher	4	7	1
(Sweden) P Hjertquist (Australia) C Johnstone	2	7	2
(Sweden) J Nyström (Sweden) M Wilander	6	5	6

Final
1	(Sweden) A Järryd (Sweden) H Simonsson	0	6	7
(Sweden) J Nyström (Sweden) M Wilander	6	3	6
