= 1981 Dutch Open – Doubles =

Doubles
- 1981 Dutch Open

Final
- Champions: (Switzerland) Heinz Günthardt (Hungary) Balázs Taróczy
- Runners-up: (South Africa) Raymond Moore (Zimbabwe) Andrew Pattison
- Score: 6–0, 6–2

Details
- Draw: 16
- Seeds: 4

Events
Singles	Doubles
- Dutch Open

Tom Okker and Balázs Taróczy were the defending champions, but Okker did not compete this year. Taróczy teamed up with Heinz Günthardt and successfully defended his title, by defeating Raymond Moore and Andrew Pattison 6–0, 6–2 in the final.

== Seeds ==
1. (Switzerland) Heinz Günthardt / (Hungary) Balázs Taróczy (champions)
2. (Czechoslovakia) Jan Kodeš / (Czechoslovakia) Tomáš Šmíd (quarterfinals)
3. (South Africa) Raymond Moore / (Zimbabwe) Andrew Pattison (final)
4. (Australia) Cliff Letcher / (Australia) Warren Maher (quarterfinals)

== Draw ==
Key

- Q = Qualifier
- WC = Wild card
- LL = Lucky loser
- Alt = Alternate
- ITF = ITF entry
- PR = Protected ranking
- SR = Special ranking
- SE = Special exempt
- JE = Junior exempt
- JR = Junior Accelerator Programme entrant
- CO = College Accelerator Programme entrant
- NG = Next Gen Accelerator Program entrant
- w/o = Walkover
- r = Retired
- d = Defaulted

=== Draw ===
First round
1	(Switzerland) H Günthardt (Hungary) B Taróczy	6	6
(Switzerland) I Dupasquier (Austria) HP Kandler	0	2
(Zimbabwe) H Ismail (United States) M Vines	7	6
(Australia) D Collings (Australia) B Guan	6	1
4	(Australia) C Letcher (Australia) W Maher	6	6
(United States) M Lee (United States) E Sherbeck	3	1
(United States) J Borowiak (United States) M Estep	3	6	6
(United States) R Blazekovic (United States) E Iskersky	6	0	3
(Bolivia) R Benavides (Netherlands) L Sanders	7	6
(New Zealand) D Mustard (Australia) J Trickey	5	1
(Chile) R Acuña (Israel) S Glickstein	3	6	6
3	(South Africa) R Moore (Zimbabwe) A Pattison	6	3	8
(Switzerland) M Günthardt (Switzerland) R Stadler	6	6
(Netherlands) T Gorter (Netherlands) R Thung	0	3
(Argentina) C Castellan (Argentina) Jorge Todero	0	3
2	(Czechoslovakia) J Kodeš (Czechoslovakia) T Šmíd	6	6

Quarterfinals
1	(Switzerland) H Günthardt (Hungary) B Taróczy	6	6
(Zimbabwe) H Ismail (United States) M Vines	0	2
4	(Australia) C Letcher (Australia) W Maher	5	4
(United States) J Borowiak (United States) M Estep	7	6
(Bolivia) R Benavides (Netherlands) L Sanders	6	6	2
3	(South Africa) R Moore (Zimbabwe) A Pattison	4	7	6
(Switzerland) M Günthardt (Switzerland) R Stadler	6	6
2	(Czechoslovakia) J Kodeš (Czechoslovakia) T Šmíd	4	1

Semifinals
1	(Switzerland) H Günthardt (Hungary) B Taróczy	6	6
(United States) J Borowiak (United States) M Estep	3	4
3	(South Africa) R Moore (Zimbabwe) A Pattison	6	6
(Switzerland) M Günthardt (Switzerland) R Stadler	2	4

Final
1	(Switzerland) H Günthardt (Hungary) B Taróczy	6	6
3	(South Africa) R Moore (Zimbabwe) A Pattison	0	2
