= 1984 Custom Credit Australian Indoor Championships – Doubles =

Doubles
- 1984 Custom Credit Australian Indoor Championships

Final
- Champions: (Sweden) Anders Järryd (Sweden) Hans Simonsson
- Runners-up: (Australia) Mark Edmondson (United States) Sherwood Stewart
- Score: 6–2, 6–4

Details
- Draw: 16
- Seeds: 4

Events
Singles	Doubles
- Australian Indoor Tennis Championships

Mark Edmondson and Sherwood Stewart were the defending champions but lost in the final 6–4, 6–4 to Anders Järryd and Hans Simonsson.

== Seeds ==
1. (Australia) Mark Edmondson / (United States) Sherwood Stewart (final)
2. (Australia) Pat Cash / (Australia) Paul McNamee (quarterfinals)
3. (United States) Peter Fleming / (United States) Ferdi Taygan (quarterfinals)
4. (Sweden) Anders Järryd / (Sweden) Hans Simonsson (champions)

== Draw ==
Key

- Q = Qualifier
- WC = Wild card
- LL = Lucky loser
- Alt = Alternate
- ITF = ITF entry
- PR = Protected ranking
- SR = Special ranking
- SE = Special exempt
- JE = Junior exempt
- JR = Junior Accelerator Programme entrant
- CO = College Accelerator Programme entrant
- NG = Next Gen Accelerator Program entrant
- w/o = Walkover
- r = Retired
- d = Defaulted

First round
1	(Australia) M Edmondson (United States) S Stewart	1	6	6
(India) V Amritraj (United States) L Shiras	6	3	2
(Australia) B Drewett (Australia) K Warwick	7	7
(Australia) D Graham (Australia) L Warder	6	5
3	(United States) P Fleming (United States) F Taygan	4	6	6
(Australia) M Kratzmann (Australia) S Youl	6	2	3
(Australia) R Frawley (Australia) J Frawley	4	6
(Australia) J Alexander (Australia) J Fitzgerald	6	7
(Australia) C Fancutt (Czechoslovakia) I Lendl	6	4	6
(Australia) W Hampson (Australia) C Miller	2	6	4
(United States) M de Palmer (United States) B Testerman	3	6	5
4	(Sweden) A Järryd (Sweden) H Simonsson	6	4	7
(Australia) B Dyke (Australia) W Masur	6	6
(Australia) M Fancutt (United States) M Leach	2	4
(United States) L Bourne (United States) M Freeman	4	2
2	(Australia) P Cash (Australia) P McNamee	6	6

Quarterfinals
1	(Australia) M Edmondson (United States) S Stewart	4	6	7
(Australia) B Drewett (Australia) K Warwick	6	3	6
3	(United States) P Fleming (United States) F Taygan	4	7	2
(Australia) J Alexander (Australia) J Fitzgerald	6	6	6
(Australia) C Fancutt (Czechoslovakia) I Lendl	6	3	2
4	(Sweden) A Järryd (Sweden) H Simonsson	2	6	6
(Australia) B Dyke (Australia) W Masur	6	6
2	(Australia) P Cash (Australia) P McNamee	4	2

Semifinals
1	(Australia) M Edmondson (United States) S Stewart	6	6
(Australia) J Alexander (Australia) J Fitzgerald	3	4
4	(Sweden) A Järryd (Sweden) H Simonsson	6	3	6
(Australia) B Dyke (Australia) W Masur	3	6	4

Final
1	(Australia) M Edmondson (United States) S Stewart	4	4
4	(Sweden) A Järryd (Sweden) H Simonsson	6	6
