= 1981 Dutch Open – Singles =

Singles
- 1981 Dutch Open

Final
- Champion: (Hungary) Balázs Taróczy
- Runner-up: (Switzerland) Heinz Günthardt
- Score: 6–3, 6–7, 6–4

Details
- Draw: 32
- Seeds: 8

Events
Singles	Doubles
← 1980 ·	Dutch Open	· 1982 →

Balázs Taróczy became the 4-time consecutive champion after defeating Heinz Günthardt 6–3, 6–7, 6–4 in the final.

== Seeds ==
1. (Poland) Wojciech Fibak (semifinals)
2. (Hungary) Balázs Taróczy (champion)
3. (Czechoslovakia) Tomáš Šmíd (quarterfinals)
4. (Israel) Shlomo Glickstein (quarterfinals)
5. (Switzerland) Heinz Günthardt (final)
6. (United States) Jeff Borowiak (quarterfinals)
7. (West Germany) Peter Elter (first round)
8. (India) Ramesh Krishnan (first round)

== Draw ==
=== Key ===
- Q = Qualifier
- WC = Wild card
- LL = Lucky loser
- Alt = Alternate
- SE = Special exempt
- PR = Protected ranking
- ITF = ITF entry
- JE = Junior exempt
- w/o = Walkover
- r = Retired
- d = Defaulted
- SR = Special ranking

=== Finals ===
Semifinals
1	(Poland) Wojciech Fibak	3	1
5	(Switzerland) Heinz Günthardt	6	6
(Switzerland) Roland Stadler	2	1
2	(Hungary) Balázs Taróczy	6	6

Final
5	(Switzerland) Heinz Günthardt	3	7	4
2	(Hungary) Balázs Taróczy	6	6	6

=== Top half ===
First round
1	(Poland) W Fibak	6	6
(United States) T Graham	3	1
(Zimbabwe) H Ismail	6	4	6
(Czechoslovakia) J Kodeš	2	6	3
(France) É Deblicker	6	6
(Netherlands) L Sanders	2	4
(United States) E Iskersky	6	6
8	(India) R Krishnan	0	2
3	(Czechoslovakia) T Šmíd	6	6
(Netherlands) M Albert	0	2
(Argentina) C Castellan	7	6
(Chile) R Acuña	5	1
(Australia) W Pascoe	2	6
(Australia) D Collings	6	7
(Australia) W Maher	3	2
5	(Switzerland) H Günthardt	6	6

Second round
1	(Poland) W Fibak	7	5	11
(Zimbabwe) H Ismail	6	7	9
(France) É Deblicker	6	1	1
(United States) E Iskersky	3	6	6
3	(Czechoslovakia) T Šmíd	6	6
(Argentina) C Castellan	3	4
(Australia) D Collings	2	2
5	(Switzerland) H Günthardt	6	6

Quarterfinals
1	(Poland) W Fibak	6	6
(United States) E Iskersky	4	3
3	(Czechoslovakia) T Šmíd	3	0
5	(Switzerland) H Günthardt	6	6

Semifinals
1	(Poland) W Fibak	3	1
5	(Switzerland) H Günthardt	6	6

=== Bottom half ===
First round
7	(West Germany) P Elter	4	3
(South Africa) R Moore	6	6
(Switzerland) R Stadler	6	2	6
(West Germany) K Eberhard	3	6	2
(Spain) M Mir	4	1
(Australia) B Guan	6	6
(Zimbabwe) A Pattison	5	6
4	(Israel) S Glickstein	7	7
6	(United States) J Borowiak	6	6
(Netherlands) E Wilborts	3	4
(Austria) HP Kandler	5	7	7
(Argentina) G Aubone	7	6	9
(United States) M Estep	3	6	2
(South Africa) R Venter	6	3	6
(Bolivia) R Benavides	3	2
2	(Hungary) B Taróczy	6	6

Second round
(South Africa) R Moore	0	1
(Switzerland) R Stadler	6	6
(Australia) B Guan	3	3
4	(Israel) S Glickstein	6	6
6	(United States) J Borowiak	6	6
(Argentina) G Aubone	2	2
(South Africa) R Venter	6	1	3
2	(Hungary) B Taróczy	4	6	6

Quarterfinals
(Switzerland) R Stadler	6	6
4	(Israel) S Glickstein	3	3
6	(United States) J Borowiak	2	3
2	(Hungary) B Taróczy	6	6

Semifinals
(Switzerland) R Stadler	2	1
2	(Hungary) B Taróczy	6	6
