= Ancona Open =

Defunct tennis tournament
- Tour: Grand Prix
- Founded: 1982
- Abolished: 1982
- Editions: 1
- Location: Ancona, Italy
- Surface: Carpet / indoor

The Ancona Open is a defunct men's tennis tournament that was played on the Grand Prix tennis circuit for one year in 1982. The event was held in Ancona, Italy and was played on indoor carpet courts.

== Finals ==
=== Singles ===
Year	Champions	Runners-up	Score
1982	(Sweden) Anders Järryd	(United States) Mike De Palmer	6–3, 6–2

=== Doubles ===
Year	Champions	Runners-up	Score
1982	(Sweden) Anders Järryd (Sweden) Hans Simonsson	(United States) Tim Gullikson (South Africa) Bernard Mitton	4–6, 6–3, 7–6
