= Bernard Mitton =

South African tennis player

- Country (sports): South Africa
- Residence: Irvine, California, U.S.
- Born: 11 September 1954 Vryburg, South Africa
- Died: 5 May 2017 (aged 62)
- Height: 1.87 m (6 ft 1 1/2 in)
- Turned pro: 1973
- Retired: 1984
- Plays: Right-handed

Singles
- Career record: 199–218
- Career titles: 2
- Highest ranking: No. 54 (15 December 1975)

Grand Slam singles results
- Australian Open: 2R (1978, 1982)
- French Open: 3R (1977)
- Wimbledon: 4R (1973, 1976)
- US Open: 4R (1980)

Doubles
- Career record: 210–191
- Career titles: 9
- Highest ranking: No. 20 (25 June 1984)

Bernard Mitton (9 November 1954 – 5 May 2017) was a professional tennis player from South Africa.

Mitton reached his highest singles ranking of world No. 51 on 15 December 1975, and his highest doubles ranking of 20 on 25 June 1984. His career record in singles on the ATP Tour was 199–218, winning two titles - at Newport, Rhode Island in 1978 and San Jose, California in 1979. He was the runner-up in three other tournaments: San Jose (1978), Adelaide (1979) and Johannesburg (1981).

His doubles record was 210–191, and he won nine titles: Auckland (1979); Stowe, Vermont and Cologne (1980); Richmond WCT (1981); Johannesburg (1981); Tampa (1981); Columbus, Ohio (1982); Ferrara (1983); and La Quinta, California (1984). He was the runner-up in eight tournaments: Sarasota, Florida (1978); North Conway, New Hampshire (1978); Rotterdam (1979); Maui, Hawaii (1982); Ancona (1982); Toulouse (1983); Florence (1984); and Queen's Club (1984).

Mitton had career wins over John McEnroe, Jimmy Connors, and Arthur Ashe in singles. He reached the fourth round at a Grand Slam tournament on three occasions. In his first Grand Slam tournament in 1973, he reached the fourth round of Wimbledon, then lost to Connors in straight sets. In 1976, he again reached the fourth round at Wimbledon, defeating former champion John Newcombe in the third round beforeg losing to Raúl Ramírez in four sets. He reached the fourth round at the 1980 US Open, defeating José Luis Clerc in the first round, then lost to Connors.

Mitton retired from the tour in 1984 due to injuries and joined the Newport Beach Tennis Club as director of tennis. From 2000 to 2003, he was at Rancho San Clemente. He taught until his death at the Racket Club of Irvine, California.

== Career finals ==
Legend
Grand Slam
ATP Masters Series
ATP Tour
Challengers
Futures

=== Singles: 5 (2 titles, 3 runner-ups) ===
Result	W-L	Date	Tournament	Surface	Opponent	Score
Loss	0–1	Apr 1978	San Jose, US	Carpet (i)	(United States) Arthur Ashe	7–6, 1–6, 2–6
Win	1–1	Jul 1978	Newport, US	Grass	(Australia) John James	6–1, 3–6, 7–6
Win	2–1	Mar 1979	San José, Costa Rica	Hard	(United States) Tom Gorman	6–4, 6–1, 6–3
Loss	2–2	Dec 1979	Adelaide, Australia	Grass	(Australia) Kim Warwick	6–7^{(3–7)}, 4–6
Loss	2–3	Apr 1981	Johannesburg, South Africa	Hard	(South Africa) Kevin Curren	4–6, 4–6

=== Doubles: 17 (9 titles, 8 runner-ups) ===
Result	W-L	Date	Tournament	Surface	Partner	Opponents	Score
Loss	0–1	Jan 1978	Sarasota, US	Carpet	(South Africa) Byron Bertram	(Switzerland) Colin Dowdeswell (Australia) Geoff Masters	6–2, 3–6, 2–6
Loss	0–2	Aug 1978	North Conway, US	Clay	(United States) Mike Fishbach	(United Kingdom) Robin Drysdale (United States) Van Winitsky	6–4, 6–7, 3–6
Win	1–2	Jan 1979	Auckland, New Zealand	Hard	(Australia) Kim Warwick	(United Kingdom) Andrew Jarrett (United Kingdom) Jonathan Smith	6–3, 2–6, 6–3
Loss	1–3	Apr 1979	Rotterdam, Netherlands	Carpet (i)	(Switzerland) Heinz Günthardt	(United States) Peter Fleming (United States) John McEnroe	4–6, 4–6
Win	2–3	Aug 1980	Stowe, US	Hard	(United States) Bob Lutz	(Romania) Ilie Năstase (United States) Ferdi Taygan	6–4, 6–3
Win	3–3	Oct 1980	Cologne, West Germany	Carpet (i)	(United States) Andrew Pattison	(Czechoslovakia) Jan Kodeš (Czechoslovakia) Tomáš Šmíd	6–4, 6–1
Win	4–3	Feb 1981	Richmond, US	Hard	(United States) Tim Gullikson	(United States) Brian Gottfried (Mexico) Raúl Ramírez	3–6, 6–2, 6–3
Win	5–3	Mar 1981	Tampa, US	Hard	(United States) Butch Walts	(Australia) David Carter (Australia) Paul Kronk	6–3, 3–6, 6–1
Win	6–3	Apr 1981	Johannesburg, South Africa	Hard	(South Africa) Ray Moore	(Israel) Shlomo Glickstein (South Africa) David Schneider	7–5, 3–6, 6–1
Win	7–3	Aug 1981	Columbus, US	Hard	(United States) Tim Gullikson	(United States) Victor Amaya (United States) Hank Pfister	4–6, 6–1, 6–4
Loss	7–4	Oct 1982	Maui, US	Hard	(Paraguay) Francisco González	(United States) Mike Cahill (United States) Eliot Teltscher	4–6, 4–6
Loss	7–5	Nov 1982	Ancona, Italy	Carpet (i)	(United States) Tim Gullikson	(Sweden) Anders Järryd (Sweden) Hans Simonsson	6–4, 3–6, 6–7
Win	8–5	Nov 1983	Ferrara, Italy	Carpet (i)	(United States) Butch Walts	(Czechoslovakia) Stanislav Birner (Sweden) Stefan Simonsson	7–6, 0–6, 6–3
Loss	8–6	Nov 1983	Toulouse, France	Carpet (i)	(United States) Butch Walts	(Switzerland) Heinz Günthardt (Czechoslovakia) Pavel Složil	7–5, 5–7, 4–6
Win	9–6	Feb 1984	La Quinta, US	Hard	(United States) Butch Walts	(United States) Scott Davis (United States) Ferdi Taygan	5–7, 6–3, 6–2
Loss	9–7	May 1984	Florence, Italy	Clay	(United States) Butch Walts	(United States) Mark Dickson (United States) Chip Hooper	6–7, 6–4, 5–7
Loss	9–8	Jun 1984	Queen's Club, UK	Grass	(United States) Butch Walts	(Australia) Pat Cash (Australia) Paul McNamee	4–6, 3–6
