= 1986 Swan Premium Open =

- Date: 13–19 October
- Edition: 14th
- Draw: 32S / 16D
- Prize money: $275,000
- Surface: Hard / indoor
- Location: Sydney, Australia
- Venue: Sydney Entertainment Centre

Champions

Singles
- (West Germany) Boris Becker

Doubles
- (West Germany) Boris Becker / (Australia) John Fitzgerald
- Australian Indoor Tennis Championships

The 1986 Swan Premium Open was a tennis tournament played on indoor hard courts at the Sydney Entertainment Centre in Sydney in Australia and was part of the 1986 Nabisco Grand Prix. It was the 14th edition of the tournament and ran from 13 through 19 October 1986. Second-seeded Boris Becker won the singles title.

== Finals ==
=== Singles ===
(West Germany) Boris Becker defeated (Czechoslovakia) Ivan Lendl 3–6, 7–6, 6–2, 6–0

- It was Becker's 6th title of the year and the 10th of his career.

=== Doubles ===
(West Germany) Boris Becker / (Australia) John Fitzgerald defeated (Australia) Peter McNamara / (Australia) Paul McNamee 6–4, 7–6

- It was Becker's 5th title of the year and the 9th of his career. It was Fitzgerald's 2nd title of the year and the 17th of his career.
