= 1980 Swedish Open =

- Date: 14–20 July
- Edition: 33rd
- Category: Grand Prix
- Draw: 32S / 16D
- Prize money: $75,000
- Surface: Clay / outdoor
- Location: Båstad, Sweden

Champions

Singles
- (Hungary) Balázs Taróczy

Doubles
- (Switzerland) Heinz Gunthardt / (Switzerland) Markus Günthardt
- Swedish Open

The 1980 Swedish Open was a men's professional tennis tournament played on outdoor clay courts and held in Båstad, Sweden. It was part of the 1980 Grand Prix circuit. It was the 33rd edition of the tournament and was held from 14 July through 20 July 1980. First-seeded Balázs Taróczy won the singles title.

== Finals ==
=== Singles ===
(Hungary) Balázs Taróczy defeated (United States) Tony Giammalva 6–3, 3–6, 7–6

- It was Taróczy's 1st singles title of the year and the 7th of his career.

=== Doubles ===
(Switzerland) Heinz Gunthardt / (Switzerland) Markus Günthardt defeated (United Kingdom) John Feaver / (Australia) Peter McNamara 6–4, 6–4
