= Hans Simonsson =

Swedish tennis player (born 1962)

- Country (sports): Sweden
- Born: 1 May 1962 (age 64) Färgaryd, Sweden
- Height: 1.78 m (5 ft 10 in)
- Plays: Right–handed
- Prize money: $325,035

Singles
- Career record: 42–73
- Career titles: 0
- Highest ranking: No. 45 (20 Dec 1982)

Grand Slam singles results
- Australian Open: 2R (1981)
- French Open: 2R (1983)
- Wimbledon: 2R (1981)
- US Open: 3R (1982)

Doubles
- Career record: 159–114
- Career titles: 11
- Highest ranking: No. 10 (10 Jan 1984)

Grand Slam doubles results
- Australian Open: 3R (1983)
- French Open: W (1983)
- Wimbledon: SF (1983)
- US Open: QF (1985)

Grand Slam mixed doubles results
- US Open: 1R (1984)

Hans Simonsson (born 1 May 1962) is a retired professional tennis player from Sweden. Primarily a doubles specialist, he won 11 ATP Tour titles in his career. He won the French Open doubles title in 1983 with his countryman Anders Järryd. He also played in the 1983 Davis Cup final for Sweden. He reached his career high doubles ranking of No. 10 in the world on 2 January 1984. Simonsson again reached the French Open doubles final in 1985, but he and Schlomo Glickstein were defeated by Mark Edmondson and Kim Warwick. The Swede finished his career prematurely at the age of 25.

He is a brother of fellow tennis player Stefan Simonsson.

== Grand Slam finals ==
=== Doubles (1 title, 1 runner-up) ===
Result	Year	Championship	Surface	Partner	Opponents	Score
Win	1983	French Open	Clay	(Sweden) Anders Järryd	(Australia) Mark Edmondson (United States) Sherwood Stewart	7–6^{(7–4)}, 6–4, 6–2
Loss	1985	French Open	Clay	(Israel) Schlomo Glickstein	(Australia) Mark Edmondson (Australia) Kim Warwick	3–6, 4–6, 7–6^{(7–5)}, 3–6

== Career finals ==
=== Doubles (11 titles, 7 runner-ups) ===
Legend Grand Slam (1) Tennis Masters Cup (1) ATP Masters Series (-) ATP Tour (10)	Titles by surface Hard (4) Clay (6) Grass (0) Carpet (2)

Result	W/L	Date	Tournament	Surface	Partner	Opponents	Score
Win	1–0	Apr 1981	Linz, Austria	Hard (i)	(Sweden) Anders Järryd	(Australia) Brad Drewett (Czechoslovakia) Pavel Složil	6–4, 7–6
Loss	1–1	Jul 1981	Båstad, Sweden	Clay	(Sweden) Anders Järryd	(Australia) Mark Edmondson (Australia) John Fitzgerald	6–2, 5–7, 0–6
Win	2–1	Oct 1981	Barcelona, Spain	Clay	(Sweden) Anders Järryd	(Chile) Hans Gildemeister (Ecuador) Andrés Gómez	6–1, 6–4
Win	3–1	Mar 1982	Linz, Austria	Hard	(Sweden) Anders Järryd	(Australia) Rod Frawley (Australia) Paul Kronk	6–2, 6–0
Loss	3–2	May 1982	Hamburg, Germany	Clay	(Sweden) Anders Järryd	(Czechoslovakia) Pavel Složil (Czechoslovakia) Tomáš Šmíd	4–6, 3–6
Win	4–2	Jul 1982	Båstad, Sweden	Clay	(Sweden) Anders Järryd	(Sweden) Joakim Nyström (Sweden) Mats Wilander	0–6, 6–3, 7–6
Loss	4–3	Sep 1982	Bordeaux, France	Clay	(Sweden) Anders Järryd	(Chile) Hans Gildemeister (Ecuador) Andrés Gómez	4–6, 2–6
Win	5–3	Oct 1982	Barcelona, Spain	Clay	(Sweden) Anders Järryd	(Brazil) Carlos Kirmayr (Brazil) Cássio Motta	6–3, 6–2
Win	6–3	Nov 1982	Ancona, Italy	Carpet (i)	(Sweden) Anders Järryd	(United States) Tim Gullikson (South Africa) Bernard Mitton	4–6, 6–3, 7–6
Loss	6–4	Mar 1983	Brussels, Belgium	Carpet	(Sweden) Mats Wilander	(Switzerland) Heinz Günthardt (Hungary) Balázs Taróczy	2–6, 4–6
Win	7–4	Jun 1983	French Open, Paris	Clay	(Sweden) Anders Järryd	(Australia) Mark Edmondson (United States) Sherwood Stewart	7–6^{(7–4)}, 6–4, 6–2
Loss	7–5	Jul 1983	Båstad, Sweden	Clay	(Sweden) Anders Järryd	(Sweden) Joakim Nyström (Sweden) Mats Wilander	6–1, 6–7^{(4–7)}, 6–7^{(4–7)}
Win	8–5	Oct 1983	Barcelona, Spain	Clay	(Sweden) Anders Järryd	(United States) Jim Gurfein (United States) Erick Iskersky	7–5, 6–3
Win	9–5	Nov 1983	Stockholm, Sweden	Hard (i)	(Sweden) Anders Järryd	(United States) Peter Fleming (United States) Johan Kriek	6–3, 6–4
Loss	9–6	Jan 1984	World Doubles, London	Carpet (i)	(Sweden) Anders Järryd	(Czechoslovakia) Pavel Složil (Czechoslovakia) Tomáš Šmíd	6–1, 3–6, 6–3, 4–6, 3–6
Win	10–6	Oct 1984	Sydney Indoor, Australia	Hard (i)	(Sweden) Anders Järryd	(Australia) Mark Edmondson (United States) Sherwood Stewart	6–4, 6–4
Loss	10–7	Jun 1985	French Open, Paris	Clay	(Israel) Shlomo Glickstein	(Australia) Mark Edmondson (Australia) Kim Warwick	3–6, 4–6, 7–6, 3–6
Win	11–7	Jul 1985	Hilversum, Netherlands	Clay	(Sweden) Stefan Simonsson	(Australia) Carl Limberger (Australia) Mark Woodforde	6–3, 6–4
