= Anders Järryd =

Swedish tennis player (born 1961)

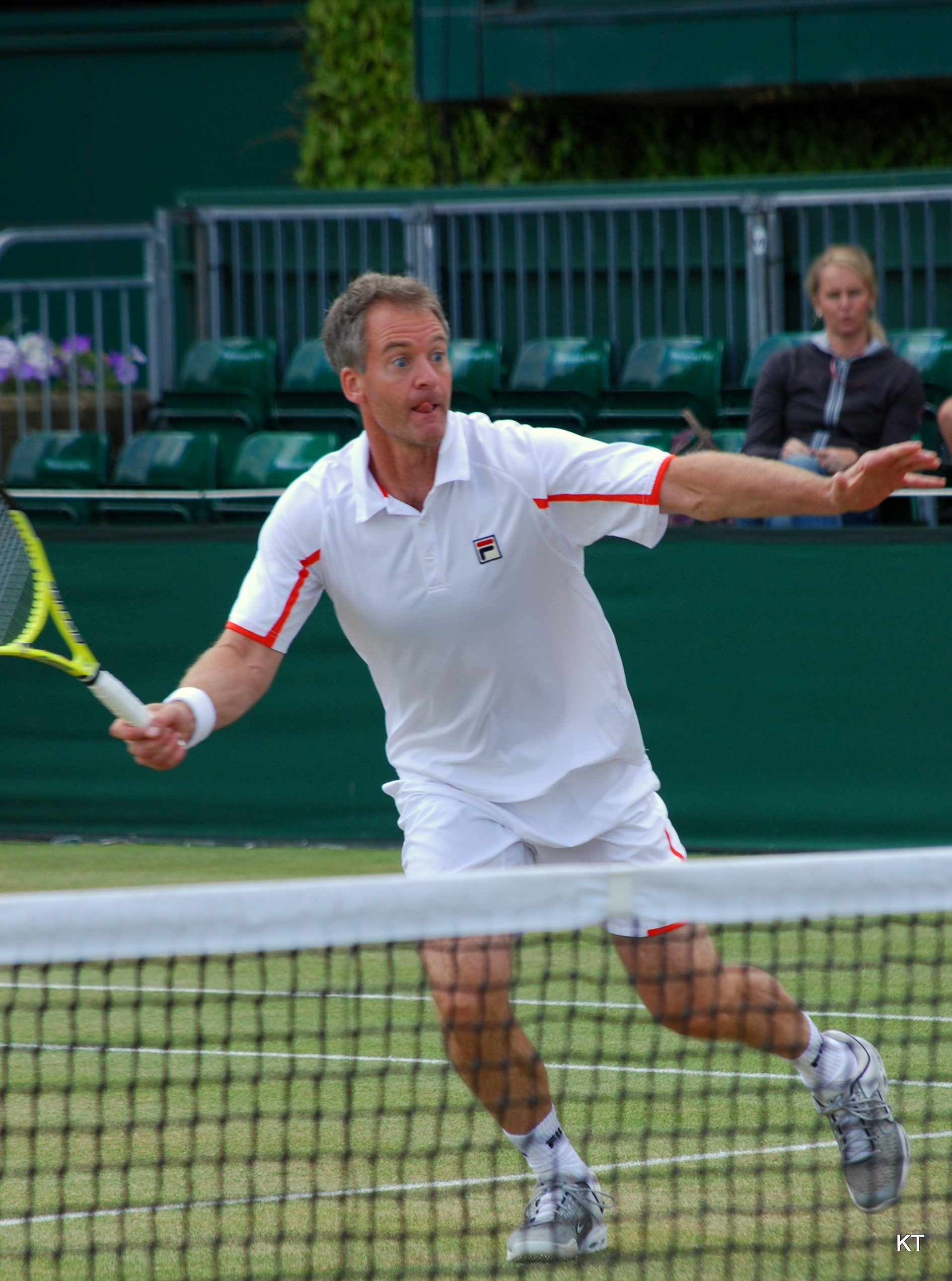
- Järryd at the 2011 Wimbledon Championships
- Country (sports): Sweden
- Born: 13 July 1961 (age 65) Lidköping, Sweden
- Height: 1.80 m (5 ft 11 in)
- Turned pro: 1980
- Retired: 1996
- Plays: Right-handed (two-handed backhand)
- Prize money: $5,378,067

Singles
- Career record: 396–261
- Career titles: 8
- Highest ranking: No. 5 (22 July 1985)

Grand Slam singles results
- Australian Open: QF (1987, 1988)
- French Open: 4R (1984, 1985)
- Wimbledon: SF (1985)
- US Open: QF (1985)

Other tournaments
- Tour Finals: SF (1985)
- WCT Finals: W (1986)
- Olympic Games: 3R (1988)

Doubles
- Career record: 590–236
- Career titles: 58
- Highest ranking: No. 1 (12 August 1985)

Grand Slam doubles results
- Australian Open: W (1987)
- French Open: W (1983, 1987, 1991)
- Wimbledon: W (1989, 1991)
- US Open: W (1987, 1991)

Other doubles tournaments
- Tour Finals: W (1985, 1986, 1991)

Grand Slam mixed doubles results
- Wimbledon: 3R (1992)
Medal record
Olympic Games – Tennis
Bronze medal – third place	1988 Seoul	Doubles

Anders Per Järryd (pronounced [ˈânːdɛʂ ˈjæ̂rːyːd]; born 13 July 1961) is a former professional tennis player from Sweden. During his career he won eight Grand Slam doubles titles (three French Open, two Wimbledon, two US Open, one Australian Open), reached the world No. 1 doubles ranking, and achieved a career-high singles ranking of world No. 5.

Järryd was born in Lidköping, Västra Götaland. He also played bandy in Lidköpings AIK, while growing up.

== Career ==
Järryd turned professional in 1980. He won his first tour doubles title in 1981 in Linz, Austria. One year later he captured his first top-level singles title, also at Linz. In 1983, Järryd won his first Grand Slam doubles title at the French Open, partnering his fellow Swede Hans Simonsson. Järryd had a strong year in 1984, winning two singles and four doubles titles. He also finished runner-up in the men's doubles at the US Open that year, partnering Stefan Edberg.

1985 saw Järryd's career-best Grand Slam singles performance, when he beat Claudio Panatta, Scott Davis, Vincent Van Patten, Danie Visser and Heinz Günthardt to reach the semi-finals at Wimbledon before being knocked out in four sets by Boris Becker. Järryd reached his career-high singles ranking of world No. 5 in July 1985, and captured the world No. 1 doubles ranking that August. At the French Open and US Open, Järryd progressed to career-best finishes in those two tournaments, finishing the fourth round and quarterfinal respectively. In 1986 he won the WCT Finals by beating Boris Becker in the final, while he and Edberg were the men's doubles runners-up at the French Open.

Järryd won three of the four Grand Slam men's doubles titles in 1987: at the Australian Open (with partner Edberg), in Roland Garros (with partner Robert Seguso), and at the US Open (with partner Edberg). Järryd was a member of Swedish team which won the Davis Cup that year. He won two singles matches in the final, in which Sweden beat India 5–0. (Järryd also played on three Swedish teams which finished runners-up in the Davis Cup: in 1986, in 1988, and in 1989.)

Järryd played with John Fitzgerald in 1988, to finish runner-up in the men's doubles at the French Open and Wimbledon. Järryd won a men's doubles bronze medal at the Olympic Games that year, partnering Edberg. Järryd was a member of the Swedish team which won the World Team Cup in 1988. He partnered Fitzgerald in 1989 to win the men's doubles title at Wimbledon, thus completing a career set of all four Grand Slam men's doubles titles. Järryd and Fitzgerald won three of the four men's doubles titles in 1991: in Roland Garros, in Wimbledon, and at the US Open, his last Grand Slam titles. Järryd reached his last Grand Slam doubles final at the 1993 Australian Open, with Fitzgerald.

Järryd won eight top-level singles titles and 58 tour doubles titles during his career. His final singles title came in 1993 at Rotterdam. He won his last doubles title in 1995 at St. Petersburg. He retired from the professional tour in 1996.

== Grand Slam finals ==
=== Doubles (8 titles, 5 runner-ups) ===
Result	Year	Championship	Surface	Partner	Opponents	Score
Win	1983	French Open	Clay	(Sweden) Hans Simonsson	(Australia) Mark Edmondson (United States) Sherwood Stewart	7–6, 6–4, 6–2
Loss	1984	US Open	Hard	(Sweden) Stefan Edberg	(Australia) John Fitzgerald (Czechoslovakia) Tomáš Šmíd	6–7, 3–6, 3–6
Loss	1986	French Open	Clay	(Sweden) Stefan Edberg	(Australia) John Fitzgerald (Czechoslovakia) Tomáš Šmíd	6–3, 4–6, 6–3, 6–7, 12–14
Win	1987	Australian Open	Grass	(Sweden) Stefan Edberg	(Australia) Peter Doohan (Australia) Laurie Warder	6–4, 6–4, 7–6
Win	1987	French Open (2)	Clay	(United States) Robert Seguso	(France) Guy Forget (France) Yannick Noah	6–7, 6–7, 6–3, 6–4, 6–2
Win	1987	US Open	Hard	(Sweden) Stefan Edberg	(United States) Ken Flach (United States) Robert Seguso	7–6, 6–2, 4–6, 5–7, 7–6
Loss	1988	French Open	Clay	(Australia) John Fitzgerald	(Ecuador) Andrés Gómez (Spain) Emilio Sánchez	3–6, 7–6, 4–6, 3–6
Loss	1988	Wimbledon	Grass	(Australia) John Fitzgerald	(United States) Ken Flach (United States) Robert Seguso	4–6, 6–2, 4–6, 6–7
Win	1989	Wimbledon	Grass	(Australia) John Fitzgerald	(United States) Rick Leach (United States) Jim Pugh	3–6, 7–6, 6–4, 7–6
Win	1991	French Open (3)	Clay	(Australia) John Fitzgerald	(United States) Rick Leach (United States) Jim Pugh	6–0, 7–5
Win	1991	Wimbledon (2)	Grass	(Australia) John Fitzgerald	(Argentina) Javier Frana (Mexico) Leonardo Lavalle	6–3, 6–4, 6–7, 6–1
Win	1991	US Open (2)	Hard	(Australia) John Fitzgerald	(United States) Scott Davis (United States) David Pate	3–6, 7–6, 6–4, 7–6
Loss	1993	Australian Open	Hard	(Australia) John Fitzgerald	(South Africa) Danie Visser (Australia) Laurie Warder	4–6, 3–6, 4–6

== Career finals ==
=== Singles: 24 (8 titles / 16 runner-ups) ===
Result	No	Date	Tournament	Surface	Opponent	Score
Loss	1.	Jul 1981	Båstad, Sweden	Clay	(France) Thierry Tulasne	2–6, 3–6
Win	1.	Mar 1982	Linz, Austria	Clay	(Spain) José Higueras	6–4, 4–6, 6–4
Win	2.	Nov 1982	Ancona, Italy	Carpet (i)	(United States) Mike De Palmer	6–3, 6–2
Loss	2.	Jul 1983	Båstad, Sweden	Clay	(Sweden) Mats Wilander	1–6, 2–6
Loss	3.	Aug 1983	Montreal, Canada	Hard	(Czechoslovakia) Ivan Lendl	2–6, 2–6
Loss	4.	Jul 1984	Båstad, Sweden	Clay	(Sweden) Henrik Sundström	6–3, 5–7, 3–6
Win	3.	Jul 1984	Hilversum, Netherlands	Clay	(Czechoslovakia) Tomáš Šmíd	6–3, 6–3, 2–6, 6–2
Loss	5.	Aug 1984	Cincinnati, U.S.	Hard	(Sweden) Mats Wilander	6–7^{(4–7)}, 3–6
Win	4.	Oct 1984	Sydney Indoor, Australia	Hard (i)	(Czechoslovakia) Ivan Lendl	6–3, 6–2, 6–4
Loss	6.	Feb 1985	Toronto Indoor, Canada	Carpet (i)	(South Africa) Kevin Curren	6–7^{(6–8)}, 3–6
Win	5.	Mar 1985	Brussels, Belgium	Carpet (i)	(Sweden) Mats Wilander	6–4, 3–6, 7–5
Loss	7.	Mar 1985	Milan, Italy	Carpet (i)	(United States) John McEnroe	4–6, 1–6
Loss	8.	Nov 1985	Stockholm, Sweden	Hard (i)	(United States) John McEnroe	1–6, 2–6
Loss	9.	Mar 1986	Rotterdam, Netherlands	Carpet (i)	(Sweden) Joakim Nyström	0–6, 3–6
Win	6.	Apr 1986	Dallas, U.S.	Carpet (i)	(West Germany) Boris Becker	6–7^{(3–7)}, 6–1, 6–1, 6–4
Loss	10.	Nov 1987	Wembley, U.K.	Carpet (i)	(Czechoslovakia) Ivan Lendl	3–6, 2–6, 5–7
Loss	11.	Feb 1989	Rotterdam, Netherlands	Carpet (i)	(Switzerland) Jakob Hlasek	1–6, 5–7
Loss	12.	Sep 1989	San Francisco, U.S.	Carpet (i)	(United States) Brad Gilbert	5–7, 2–6
Win	7.	Oct 1990	Vienna, Austria	Carpet (i)	(Austria) Horst Skoff	6–3, 6–3, 6–1
Loss	13.	Mar 1991	Copenhagen, Denmark	Carpet (i)	(Sweden) Jonas Svensson	7–6^{(7–5)}, 2–6, 2–6
Loss	14.	Mar 1992	Copenhagen, Denmark	Carpet (i)	(Sweden) Magnus Larsson	4–6, 6–7^{(5–7)}
Win	8.	Feb 1993	Rotterdam, Netherlands	Carpet (i)	(Czech Republic) Karel Nováček	6–3, 7–5
Loss	15.	Oct 1994	Beijing, China	Carpet (i)	(United States) Michael Chang	5–7, 5–7
Loss	16.	Jun 1995	Rosmalen, Netherlands	Grass	(Slovakia) Karol Kučera	6–7^{(7–9)}, 6–7^{(4–7)}

=== Doubles: 91 (58 titles / 33 runner-ups) ===
Result	No	Date	Tournament	Surface	Partner	Opponents	Score
Win	1.	Apr 1981	Linz, Austria	Hard (i)	(Sweden) Hans Simonsson	(Australia) Brad Drewett (Czechoslovakia) Pavel Složil	6–4, 7–6
Loss	1.	Jul 1981	Båstad, Sweden	Clay	(Sweden) Hans Simonsson	(Australia) Mark Edmondson (Australia) John Fitzgerald	6–2, 5–7, 0–6
Loss	2.	Sep 1981	Bordeaux, France	Clay	(United States) Jim Gurfein	(Ecuador) Andrés Gómez (Chile) Belus Prajoux	5–7, 3–6
Win	2.	Oct 1981	Barcelona, Spain	Clay	(Sweden) Hans Simonsson	(Chile) Hans Gildemeister (Ecuador) Andrés Gómez	6–1, 6–4
Win	3.	Mar 1982	Linz, Austria	Clay	(Sweden) Hans Simonsson	(Australia) Rod Frawley (Australia) Paul Kronk	6–2, 6–0
Loss	3.	May 1982	Hamburg Masters, West Germany	Clay	(Sweden) Hans Simonsson	(Czechoslovakia) Pavel Složil (Czechoslovakia) Tomáš Šmíd	4–6, 3–6
Win	4.	Jul 1982	Båstad, Sweden	Clay	(Sweden) Hans Simonsson	(Sweden) Joakim Nyström (Sweden) Mats Wilander	0–6, 6–3, 7–6
Loss	4.	Sep 1982	Bordeaux, France	Clay	(Sweden) Hans Simonsson	(Chile) Hans Gildemeister (Ecuador) Andrés Gómez	4–6, 2–6
Win	5.	Oct 1982	Barcelona, Spain	Clay	(Sweden) Hans Simonsson	(Brazil) Carlos Kirmayr (Brazil) Cássio Motta	6–3, 6–2
Win	6.	Nov 1982	Ancona, Italy	Carpet (i)	(Sweden) Hans Simonsson	(United States) Tim Gullikson (South Africa) Bernard Mitton	4–6, 6–3, 7–6
Win	7.	Mar 1983	Nancy, France	Hard (i)	(Sweden) Jan Gunnarsson	(Chile) Ricardo Acuña (Chile) Belus Prajoux	7–5, 6–3
Loss	5.	May 1983	Munich, West Germany	Clay	(Czechoslovakia) Tomáš Šmíd	(New Zealand) Chris Lewis (Czechoslovakia) Pavel Složil	4–6, 2–6
Win	8.	Jun 1983	French Open, Paris	Clay	(Sweden) Hans Simonsson	(Australia) Mark Edmondson (United States) Sherwood Stewart	7–6^{(7–4)}, 6–4, 6–2
Loss	6.	Jul 1983	Båstad, Sweden	Clay	(Sweden) Hans Simonsson	(Sweden) Joakim Nyström (Sweden) Mats Wilander	6–1, 6–7^{(4–7)}, 6–7^{(4–7)}
Win	9.	Oct 1983	Barcelona, Spain	Clay	(Sweden) Hans Simonsson	(United States) Jim Gurfein (United States) Erick Iskersky	7–5, 6–3
Win	10.	Nov 1983	Stockholm Open, Sweden	Hard (i)	(Sweden) Hans Simonsson	(United States) Peter Fleming (United States) Johan Kriek	6–3, 6–4
Loss	7.	Jan 1984	WCT World Doubles, London	Carpet (i)	(Sweden) Hans Simonsson	(Czechoslovakia) Pavel Složil (Czechoslovakia) Tomáš Šmíd	6–1, 3–6, 6–3, 4–6, 3–6
Win	11.	Apr 1984	Luxembourg	Carpet (i)	(Czechoslovakia) Tomáš Šmíd	(Australia) Mark Edmondson (United States) Sherwood Stewart	6–3, 7–5
Win	12.	May 1984	Hamburg Masters, West Germany	Clay	(Sweden) Stefan Edberg	(Switzerland) Heinz Günthardt (Hungary) Balázs Taróczy	6–3, 6–1
Win	13.	Jul 1984	Hilversum, Netherlands	Clay	(Czechoslovakia) Tomáš Šmíd	(Australia) Broderick Dyke (Australia) Michael Fancutt	6–4, 5–7, 7–6
Loss	8.	Sep 1984	US Open, New York	Hard	(Sweden) Stefan Edberg	(Australia) John Fitzgerald (Czechoslovakia) Tomáš Šmíd	6–7^{(5–7)}, 3–6, 3–6
Win	14.	Oct 1984	Sydney Indoor, Australia	Hard (i)	(Sweden) Hans Simonsson	(Australia) Mark Edmondson (United States) Sherwood Stewart	6–4, 6–4
Win	15.	Feb 1985	Toronto Indoor, Canada	Carpet (i)	(United States) Peter Fleming	(United States) Glenn Layendecker (Canada) Glenn Michibata	7–6, 6–2
Win	16.	Mar 1985	Brussels, Belgium	Carpet (i)	(Sweden) Stefan Edberg	(South Africa) Kevin Curren (Poland) Wojtek Fibak	6–3, 7–6
Win	17.	Mar 1985	Milan, Italy	Carpet (i)	(Switzerland) Heinz Günthardt	(Australia) Broderick Dyke (Australia) Wally Masur	6–2, 6–1
Win	18.	May 1985	Rome Masters, Italy	Clay	(Sweden) Mats Wilander	(United States) Ken Flach (United States) Robert Seguso	4–6, 6–3, 6–2
Win	19.	Jul 1985	Båstad, Sweden	Clay	(Sweden) Stefan Edberg	(Spain) Sergio Casal (Spain) Emilio Sánchez	6–0, 7–6^{(7–2)}
Loss	9.	Aug 1985	Montreal, Canada	Hard	(Sweden) Stefan Edberg	(United States) Ken Flach (United States) Robert Seguso	7–5, 6–7, 3–6
Win	20.	Aug 1985	Cincinnati Masters, U.S.	Hard	(Sweden) Stefan Edberg	(Sweden) Joakim Nyström (Sweden) Mats Wilander	4–6, 6–2, 6–3
Win	21.	Oct 1985	Sydney Indoor, Australia	Hard (i)	(Australia) John Fitzgerald	(Australia) Mark Edmondson (Australia) Kim Warwick	6–3, 6–2
Win	22.	Nov 1985	Wembley, England	Carpet (i)	(France) Guy Forget	(West Germany) Boris Becker (Socialist Federal Republic of Yugoslavia) Slobodan Živojinović	7–5, 4–6, 7–5
Win	23.	Jan 1986	Masters Cup, New York	Carpet (i)	(Sweden) Stefan Edberg	(Sweden) Joakim Nyström (Sweden) Mats Wilander	6–1, 7–6^{(7–5)}
Loss	10.	Feb 1986	Philadelphia, U.S.	Carpet (i)	(Sweden) Stefan Edberg	(United States) Scott Davis (United States) David Pate	6–7, 6–3, 3–6, 5–7
Loss	11.	Feb 1986	Memphis, U.S.	Hard (i)	(France) Guy Forget	(United States) Ken Flach (United States) Robert Seguso	4–6, 6–4, 6–7^{(5–7)}
Loss	12.	Feb 1986	Boca West, U.S.	Hard	(Sweden) Stefan Edberg	(United States) Brad Gilbert (United States) Vincent Van Patten	w/o
Win	24.	May 1986	Madrid, Spain	Clay	(Sweden) Joakim Nyström	(Spain) Jesus Colas (Spain) David de Miguel	6–2, 6–2
Loss	13.	Jun 1986	French Open, Paris	Clay	(Sweden) Stefan Edberg	(Australia) John Fitzgerald (Czechoslovakia) Tomáš Šmíd	3–6, 6–4, 3–6, 7–6^{(7–2)}, 12–14
Win	25.	Sep 1986	Los Angeles, U.S.	Hard	(Sweden) Stefan Edberg	(United States) Peter Fleming (United States) John McEnroe	3–6, 7–5, 7–6^{(9–7)}
Win	26.	Dec 1986	Masters Doubles, London	Carpet (i)	(Sweden) Stefan Edberg	(France) Guy Forget (France) Yannick Noah	6–3, 7–6^{(7–2)}, 6–3
Win	27.	Jan 1987	Australian Open, Melbourne	Grass	(Sweden) Stefan Edberg	(Australia) Peter Doohan (Australia) Laurie Warder	6–4, 6–4, 7–6^{(7–3)}
Win	28.	Feb 1987	Memphis, USA	Hard (i)	(Sweden) Jonas Svensson	(Spain) Sergio Casal (Spain) Mike Leach	6–4, 6–2
Win	29.	Mar 1987	Rotterdam, Netherlands	Carpet (i)	(Sweden) Stefan Edberg	(United States) Chip Hooper (United States) Emilio Sánchez	3–6, 6–3, 6–4
Loss	14.	Apr 1987	Tokyo Outdoor, Japan	Hard	(Ecuador) Andrés Gómez	(United States) Paul Annacone (United States) Kevin Curren	4–6, 6–7
Win	30.	Jun 1987	French Open, Paris	Clay	(United States) Robert Seguso	(France) Guy Forget (France) Yannick Noah	6–7^{(5–7)}, 6–7^{(2–7)}, 6–3, 6–4, 6–2
Win	31.	Aug 1987	Båstad, Sweden	Clay	(Sweden) Stefan Edberg	(Spain) Emilio Sánchez (Spain) Javier Sánchez	7–6, 6–3
Win	32.	Sep 1987	US Open, New York	Hard	(Sweden) Stefan Edberg	(United States) Ken Flach (United States) Robert Seguso	7–6^{(7–1)}, 6–2, 4–6, 5–7, 7–6^{(7–2)}
Win	33.	Oct 1987	Basel, Switzerland	Hard (i)	(Czechoslovakia) Tomáš Šmíd	(Czechoslovakia) Stanislav Birner (Czechoslovakia) Jaroslav Navrátil	6–4, 6–3
Win	34.	Nov 1987	Stockholm Open, Sweden	Hard (i)	(Sweden) Stefan Edberg	(United States) Jim Grabb (United States) Jim Pugh	6–3, 6–4
Win	35.	Mar 1988	Key Biscayne, U.S.	Hard	(Australia) John Fitzgerald	(United States) Ken Flach (United States) Robert Seguso	7–6, 6–1, 7–5
Loss	15.	May 1988	Rome Masters, Italy	Clay	(Czechoslovakia) Tomáš Šmíd	(Mexico) Jorge Lozano (United States) Todd Witsken	3–6, 3–6
Loss	16.	Jun 1988	French Open, Paris	Clay	(Australia) John Fitzgerald	(Ecuador) Andrés Gómez (Spain) Emilio Sánchez	3–6, 7–6^{(10–8)}, 4–6, 3–6
Loss	17.	Jul 1988	Wimbledon, London	Grass	(Australia) John Fitzgerald	(United States) Ken Flach (United States) Robert Seguso	4–6, 6–2, 4–6, 6–7^{(3–7)}
Loss	18.	Jul 1988	Stuttgart Outdoor, West Germany	Clay	(Denmark) Michael Mortensen	(Spain) Sergio Casal (Spain) Emilio Sánchez	6–4, 3–6, 4–6
Win	36.	Apr 1989	Key Biscayne, U.S.	Hard	(Switzerland) Jakob Hlasek	(United States) Jim Grabb (United States) Patrick McEnroe	6–3, ret.
Win	37.	Jul 1989	Wimbledon, London	Grass	(Australia) John Fitzgerald	(United States) Rick Leach (United States) Jim Pugh	3–6, 7–6^{(7–4)}, 6–4, 7–6^{(7–4)}
Loss	19.	Sep 1989	Los Angeles, U.S.	Hard	(Australia) John Fitzgerald	(United States) Martin Davis (United States) Tim Pawsat	5–7, 6–7
Win	38.	Oct 1989	Vienna, Austria	Carpet (i)	(Sweden) Jan Gunnarsson	(United States) Paul Annacone (New Zealand) Kelly Evernden	6–2, 6–3
Win	39.	Nov 1989	Paris Masters, France	Carpet (i)	(Australia) John Fitzgerald	(Switzerland) Jakob Hlasek (France) Eric Winogradsky	7–6, 6–4
Loss	20.	Dec 1989	Masters Doubles, London	Carpet (i)	(Australia) John Fitzgerald	(United States) Jim Grabb (United States) Patrick McEnroe	5–7, 6–7^{(4–7)}, 7–5, 3–6
Loss	21.	Oct 1990	Stockholm Open, Sweden	Carpet (i)	(Australia) John Fitzgerald	(France) Guy Forget (Switzerland) Jakob Hlasek	4–6, 2–6
Loss	22.	Nov 1990	Moscow, Soviet Union	Carpet (i)	(Australia) John Fitzgerald	(Netherlands) Hendrik Jan Davids (Netherlands) Paul Haarhuis	4–6, 6–7
Win	40.	Mar 1991	Rotterdam, Netherlands	Carpet (i)	(United States) Patrick Galbraith	(United States) Steve DeVries (Australia) David Macpherson	7–6, 6–2
Loss	23.	Apr 1991	Tokyo Outdoor, Japan	Hard	(Australia) John Fitzgerald	(Sweden) Stefan Edberg (Australia) Todd Woodbridge	4–6, 7–5, 4–6
Loss	24.	May 1991	Munich, Germany	Clay	(South Africa) Danie Visser	(United States) Patrick Galbraith (United States) Todd Witsken	5–7, 4–6
Win	41.	Jun 1991	French Open, Paris	Clay	(Australia) John Fitzgerald	(United States) Rick Leach (United States) Jim Pugh	6–0, 7–6
Win	42.	Jul 1991	Wimbledon, London	Grass	(Australia) John Fitzgerald	(Argentina) Javier Frana (Mexico) Leonardo Lavalle	6–3, 6–4, 6–7^{(7–9)}, 6–1
Loss	25.	Jul 1991	Båstad, Sweden	Clay	(Sweden) Magnus Gustafsson	(Sweden) Ronnie Båthman (Sweden) Rikard Bergh	4–6, 4–6
Win	43.	Sep 1991	US Open, New York	Hard	(Australia) John Fitzgerald	(United States) Scott Davis (United States) David Pate	6–3, 3–6, 6–3, 6–3
Win	44.	Oct 1991	Vienna, Austria	Carpet (i)	(South Africa) Gary Muller	(Switzerland) Jakob Hlasek (United States) Patrick McEnroe	6–4, 7–5
Win	45.	Oct 1991	Stockholm Open, Sweden	Carpet (i)	(Australia) John Fitzgerald	(Netherlands) Tom Nijssen (Czechoslovakia) Cyril Suk	7–5, 6–2
Win	46.	Nov 1991	Paris Masters, France	Carpet (i)	(Australia) John Fitzgerald	(United States) Kelly Jones (United States) Rick Leach	3–6, 6–3, 6–2
Win	47.	Nov 1991	Doubles Championships, Johannesburg	Hard (i)	(Australia) John Fitzgerald	(United States) Ken Flach (United States) Robert Seguso	6–4, 6–4, 2–6, 6–4
Loss	26.	Feb 1992	Stuttgart Indoor, Germany	Carpet (i)	(Australia) John Fitzgerald	(Netherlands) Tom Nijssen (Czechoslovakia) Cyril Suk	3–6, 7–6, 3–6
Loss	27.	Apr 1992	Tokyo Outdoor, Japan	Hard	(Australia) John Fitzgerald	(United States) Kelly Jones (United States) Rick Leach	6–0, 5–7, 3–6
Win	48.	Jun 1992	London Queen's Club, England	Grass	(Australia) John Fitzgerald	(Croatia) Goran Ivanišević (Italy) Diego Nargiso	6–4, 7–6
Win	49.	Oct 1992	Bolzano, Italy	Carpet (i)	(Norway) Bent-Ove Pedersen	(Netherlands) Tom Nijssen (Czechoslovakia) Cyril Suk	6–1, 6–7, 6–3
Win	50.	Oct 1992	Vienna, Austria	Carpet (i)	(Sweden) Ronnie Båthman	(United States) Kent Kinnear (Germany) Udo Riglewski	6–3, 7–5
Win	51.	Nov 1992	Antwerp, Belgium	Carpet (i)	(Australia) John Fitzgerald	(United States) Patrick McEnroe (United States) Jared Palmer	6–2, 6–2
Loss	28.	Nov 1992	Doubles Championships, Johannesburg	Hard	(Australia) John Fitzgerald	(Australia) Mark Woodforde (Australia) Todd Woodbridge	2–6, 6–7^{(4–7)}, 7–5, 6–3, 3–6
Loss	29.	Jan 1993	Australian Open, Melbourne	Hard	(Australia) John Fitzgerald	(South Africa) Danie Visser (Australia) Laurie Warder	4–6, 3–6, 4–6
Win	52.	Feb 1993	Dubai, UAE	Hard	(Australia) John Fitzgerald	(Canada) Grant Connell (United States) Patrick Galbraith	6–2, 6–1
Win	53.	Feb 1993	Rotterdam, Netherlands	Carpet (i)	(Sweden) Henrik Holm	(South Africa) David Adams (Russia) Andrei Olhovskiy	6–4, 7–6
Win	54.	Jul 1993	Båstad, Sweden	Clay	(Sweden) Henrik Holm	(United States) Brian Devening (Sweden) Tomas Nydahl	6–1, 3–6, 6–3
Win	55.	Mar 1994	Zaragoza, Spain	Carpet (i)	(Sweden) Henrik Holm	(Czech Republic) Martin Damm (Czech Republic) Karel Nováček	7–5, 6–2
Win	56.	Apr 1994	Tokyo Outdoor, Japan	Hard	(Sweden) Henrik Holm	(Canada) Sébastien Lareau (United States) Patrick McEnroe	7–6, 6–1
Loss	30.	May 1994	Hamburg Masters, Germany	Clay	(Sweden) Henrik Holm	(United States) Scott Melville (South Africa) Piet Norval	3–6, 4–6
Win	57.	Mar 1995	Rotterdam, Netherlands	Carpet (i)	(Czech Republic) Martin Damm	(Spain) Tomás Carbonell (Spain) Francisco Roig	6–3, 6–2
Win	58.	Mar 1995	St. Petersburg Open, Russia	Carpet (i)	(Czech Republic) Martin Damm	(Switzerland) Jakob Hlasek (Russia) Yevgeny Kafelnikov	6–4, 6–2
Loss	31.	Apr 1995	Tokyo Outdoor, Japan	Hard	(Australia) John Fitzgerald	(The Bahamas) Mark Knowles (United States) Jonathan Stark	3–6, 6–3, 6–7
Loss	32.	Apr 1995	Hong Kong	Hard	(Australia) John Fitzgerald	(United States) Tommy Ho (Australia) Mark Philippoussis	1–6, 7–6^{(7–2)}, 6–7^{(3–7)}
Loss	33.	Jun 1996	Rosmalen, Netherlands	Grass	(Canada) Daniel Nestor	(Australia) Paul Kilderry (Czech Republic) Pavel Vízner	5–7, 3–6

== Career statistics ==
=== Grand Slam singles performance timeline ===
Key
W	F	SF	QF	#R	RR	Q#	DNQ	A	NH

(W) winner; (F) finalist; (SF) semifinalist; (QF) quarterfinalist; (#R) rounds 4, 3, 2, 1; (RR) round-robin stage; (Q#) qualification round; (DNQ) did not qualify; (A) absent; (NH) not held; (SR) strike rate (events won / competed); (W–L) win–loss record.

Tournament	1981	1982	1983	1984	1985	1986	1987	1988	1989	1990	1991	1992	1993	1994	1995	1996	SR	W–L	Win %
Australian Open	1R	A	4R	A	A	NH	QF	QF	2R	A	2R	1R	2R	1R	A	A	0 / 9	14–9	60.9%
French Open	1R	3R	1R	4R	4R	3R	2R	1R	2R	2R	1R	1R	1R	A	A	A	0 / 13	13–13	50.0%
Wimbledon	1R	1R	1R	1R	SF	2R	QF	2R	1R	2R (Note: Järryd withdrew before the second round of the 1990 Wimbledon tournament, which does not officially count as a loss.)	2R	2R	1R	A	2R	1R	0 / 15	15–14	51.7%
US Open	A	A	3R	4R	QF	3R	4R	A	2R	2R	3R	1R	A	A	1R	A	0 / 10	18–10	64.3%
Win–loss	0–3	2–2	5–4	6–3	12–3	5–3	12–4	5–3	3–4	3–2	4–4	1–4	1–3	0–1	1–2	0–1	0 / 47	60–46	56.6%

=== Grand Slam doubles performance timeline ===
Tournament	1981	1982	1983	1984	1985	1986	1987	1988	1989	1990	1991	1992	1993	1994	1995	1996	SR	W–L	Win %
Australian Open	1R	A	2R	A	A	NH	W	QF	QF	A	3R	3R	F	3R	A	A	1 / 9	28–8	77.8%
French Open	A	1R	W	3R	SF	F	W	F	SF	1R	W	2R	3R	2R	3R	A	3 / 14	51–11	82.2%
Wimbledon	A	2R	SF	3R	3R	1R	SF	F	W	1R	W	2R	2R	1R	1R	1R	2 / 15	37–13	74.0%
US Open	A	A	2R	F	2R	2R	W	3R	SF	QF	W	3R	A	1R	3R	A	2 / 12	38–10	79.2%
Win–loss	0–1	1–2	14–3	10–3	8–3	7–3	26–1	18–4	21–3	4–3	23–1	6–4	9–3	3–4	4–3	0–1	8 / 50	154–42	78.6%
