= 1981 Grand Prix (tennis) =

Tennis circuit

1981 Grand Prix circuit
Details
- Duration: January 5, 1981 – January 17, 1982
- Edition: 12th
- Tournaments: 89
- Categories: Grand Slam (4); Grand Prix (74); World Championship Tennis (9); Team Events (2)

Achievements (singles)
- Most titles: (United States) John McEnroe (10)
- Most finals: (Czechoslovakia) Ivan Lendl (14)
- Prize money leader: (United States) John McEnroe ($991,000)
- Points leader: (Czechoslovakia) Ivan Lendl (1571)

Awards
- Player of the year: (United States) John McEnroe
- Most improved player of the year: (Australia) Peter McNamara
- Newcomer of the year: (United States) Tim Mayotte
- Comeback player of the year: (United States) Jeff Borowiak

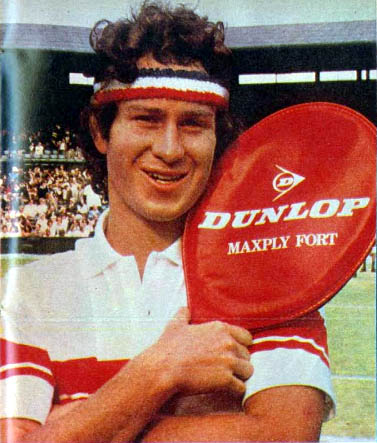
John McEnroe finished the year as ATP world No. 1 for the first time in his career. McEnroe won ten titles during the season, including two majors at the Wimbledon Championships and the US Open.

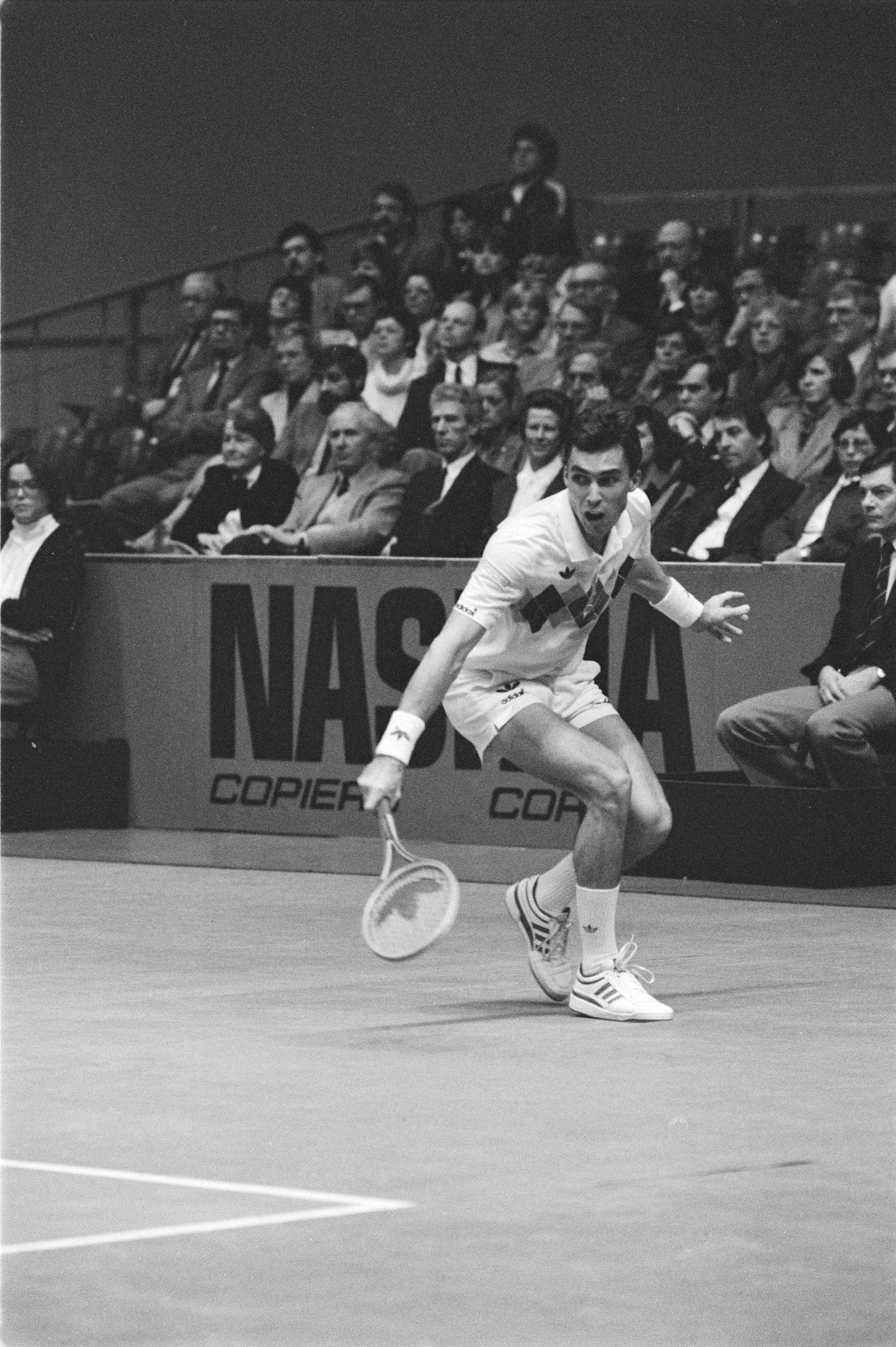
Ivan Lendl was the 1981 Grand Prix No. 1. Lendl won eight tournaments during the season, including the Masters Grand Prix, and finished runner-up at a major at the French Open.

The 1981 Volvo Grand Prix was the only men's professional tennis circuit held that year. It consisted of the four Grand Slam tournaments and the Grand Prix tournaments. The World Championship Tennis (WCT) Tour was incorporated into the Grand Prix circuit. The WCT tour consisted of eight regular tournaments, a season's final, three tournaments categorized as special events and a doubles championship. In total 89 tournaments were held divided over 29 countries. The circuit was administered by the Men's International Professional Tennis Council (MIPTC).

== Schedule ==
The table below shows the 1981 Volvo Grand Prix schedule (precursor to the ATP Tour).

Key

Grand Slam tournaments
Tour finals
Super Series
Regular Series

=== January ===
Week	Tournament	Champions	Runners-up	Semifinalists	Quarterfinalists
5 Jan	South Australian Open; Adelaide, Australia; Grass – $50,000 – 32S/16D; Singles – Doubles	(Australia) Mark Edmondson; 7–5, 6–2	(Australia) Brad Drewett	(South Africa) Eddie Edwards (Australia) Syd Ball	(Australia) Chris Johnstone (Australia) Wayne Pascoe (United States) Tom Gullikson (Australia) John Fitzgerald
5 Jan	South Australian Open; Adelaide, Australia; Grass – $50,000 – 32S/16D; Singles – Doubles	(Australia) Colin Dibley (Australia) John James; 6–3, 6–4	(United States) Craig Edwards (South Africa) Eddie Edwards	(South Africa) Eddie Edwards (Australia) Syd Ball	(Australia) Chris Johnstone (Australia) Wayne Pascoe (United States) Tom Gullikson (Australia) John Fitzgerald
5 Jan	Benson and Hedges Open; Auckland, New Zealand; Hard – $50,000 – 32S/16D; Singles	(United States) Bill Scanlon; 6–7, 6–3, 3–6, 7–6, 6–0	(United States) Tim Wilkison	(New Zealand) Onny Parun (United States) Billy Martin	(United States) Chris Mayotte (New Zealand) Russell Simpson (United States) Ferdi Taygan (United States) Ron Hightower
5 Jan	Benson and Hedges Open; Auckland, New Zealand; Hard – $50,000 – 32S/16D; Singles	(United States) Ferdi Taygan (United States) Tim Wilkison; 7–5, 6–1	(United States) Tony Graham (United States) Bill Scanlon	(New Zealand) Onny Parun (United States) Billy Martin	(United States) Chris Mayotte (New Zealand) Russell Simpson (United States) Ferdi Taygan (United States) Ron Hightower
5 Jan	Masters Doubles WCT; London, Great Britain; Carpet (i) – $200,000 – D8	(Australia) Peter McNamara (Australia) Paul McNamee; 6–3, 2–6, 3–6, 6–3, 6–2	(United States) Victor Amaya (United States) Hank Pfister	(Switzerland) Heinz Günthardt / (United States) Sandy Mayer (United States) Bob Lutz / (United States) Stan Smith	
19 Jan	Monterrey WCT; Monterrey, Mexico; Carpet (i) – $175,000 – 32S/16D	(South Africa) Johan Kriek; 7–6, 3–6, 7–6	(United States) Vitas Gerulaitis	(India) Vijay Amritraj (Poland) Wojciech Fibak	(United States) Bruce Manson (France) Pascal Portes (Mexico) Raúl Ramírez (United States) John Sadri
19 Jan	Monterrey WCT; Monterrey, Mexico; Carpet (i) – $175,000 – 32S/16D	(United States) Steve Denton (South Africa) Kevin Curren; 7–6, 6–3	(South Africa) Johan Kriek (New Zealand) Russell Simpson	(India) Vijay Amritraj (Poland) Wojciech Fibak	(United States) Bruce Manson (France) Pascal Portes (Mexico) Raúl Ramírez (United States) John Sadri
19 Jan	Guaruja, Brazil; Hard – $75,000 – 32S/16D	(Brazil) Carlos Kirmayr; 6–4, 6–2	(Argentina) Ricardo Cano	(Romania) Ilie Năstase (Sweden) Kjell Johansson	(United States) Eddie Dibbs (Spain) Ángel Giménez (France) Eric Deblicker (United States) Bill Scanlon
19 Jan	Guaruja, Brazil; Hard – $75,000 – 32S/16D	(Australia) David Carter (Australia) Paul Kronk; 6–1, 7–6	(Spain) Ángel Giménez (Colombia) Jairo Velasco, Sr.	(Romania) Ilie Năstase (Sweden) Kjell Johansson	(United States) Eddie Dibbs (Spain) Ángel Giménez (France) Eric Deblicker (United States) Bill Scanlon
19 Jan	San Juan, Puerto Rico, U.S. Hard – $75,000 – 32S/16D	(United States) Eliot Teltscher; 6–4, 6–2	(United States) Tim Gullikson	(United States) Sandy Mayer (Paraguay) Francisco González	(India) Sashi Menon (Puerto Rico) Freddy de Jesús (United States) Tim Mayotte (United States) George Hardie
19 Jan	San Juan, Puerto Rico, U.S. Hard – $75,000 – 32S/16D	(United States) Chris Mayotte (United States) Tim Mayotte; 6–4, 7–6	(United States) Tim Gullikson (United States) Eliot Teltscher	(United States) Sandy Mayer (Paraguay) Francisco González	(India) Sashi Menon (Puerto Rico) Freddy de Jesús (United States) Tim Mayotte (United States) George Hardie
26 Jan	U.S. Pro Indoor (WCT); Philadelphia, Pennsylvania, U.S. Carpet (i) – $250,000 – 64S/32D; Singles – Doubles	(United States) Roscoe Tanner; 6–2, 7–6, 7–5	(Poland) Wojciech Fibak	(France) Yannick Noah (France) Thierry Tulasne	(United States) Jimmy Connors (United States) Vitas Gerulaitis (United States) John Sadri (France) Pascal Portes
26 Jan	U.S. Pro Indoor (WCT); Philadelphia, Pennsylvania, U.S. Carpet (i) – $250,000 – 64S/32D; Singles – Doubles	(United States) Sherwood Stewart (United States) Marty Riessen; 6–2, 6–2	(United States) Brian Gottfried (Mexico) Raúl Ramírez	(France) Yannick Noah (France) Thierry Tulasne	(United States) Jimmy Connors (United States) Vitas Gerulaitis (United States) John Sadri (France) Pascal Portes
26 Jan	Viña del Mar, Chile; Clay – $50,000 – 32S/16D	(Paraguay) Víctor Pecci; 6–4, 6–0	(Spain) José Higueras	(United States) Eddie Dibbs (Sweden) Kjell Johansson	(Paraguay) Pedro Rebolledo (Colombia) Alejandro Cortes (Chile) Jaime Fillol (Ecuador) Andrés Gómez
26 Jan	Viña del Mar, Chile; Clay – $50,000 – 32S/16D	(Australia) Paul Kronk (Australia) David Carter; 6–1, 6–2	(Ecuador) Andrés Gómez (Paraguay) Belus Prajoux	(United States) Eddie Dibbs (Sweden) Kjell Johansson	(Paraguay) Pedro Rebolledo (Colombia) Alejandro Cortes (Chile) Jaime Fillol (Ecuador) Andrés Gómez

=== February ===
Week	Tournament	Champions	Runners-up	Semifinalists	Quarterfinalists
2 Feb	Mar del Plata Open; Mar del Plata, Argentina; Clay – $75,000 – 32S/16D	(Argentina) Guillermo Vilas; 2–6, 6–3, 2–1, ret.	(Paraguay) Víctor Pecci	(Spain) José Higueras (Spain) José López-Maeso	(Argentina) Carlos Castellan (Sweden) Kjell Johansson (France) Dominique Bedel (United States) Eddie Dibbs
2 Feb	Mar del Plata Open; Mar del Plata, Argentina; Clay – $75,000 – 32S/16D	(Australia) Paul Kronk (Australia) David Carter; 6–7, 6–4, 6–0	(Spain) Ángel Giménez (Colombia) Jairo Velasco, Sr.	(Spain) José Higueras (Spain) José López-Maeso	(Argentina) Carlos Castellan (Sweden) Kjell Johansson (France) Dominique Bedel (United States) Eddie Dibbs
2 Feb	Richmond WCT; Richmond, Virginia, U.S. Carpet (i) – $175,000 – 32S/16D	(France) Yannick Noah; 6–1, 3–1, ret.	(Czechoslovakia) Ivan Lendl	(United States) Roscoe Tanner (United States) Terry Moor	(United States) Gene Mayer (United States) Butch Walts (Mexico) Raúl Ramírez (India) Vijay Amritraj
2 Feb	Richmond WCT; Richmond, Virginia, U.S. Carpet (i) – $175,000 – 32S/16D	(South Africa) Bernard Mitton (United States) Tim Gullikson; 3–6, 6–2, 6–3	(United States) Brian Gottfried (Mexico) Raúl Ramírez	(United States) Roscoe Tanner (United States) Terry Moor	(United States) Gene Mayer (United States) Butch Walts (Mexico) Raúl Ramírez (India) Vijay Amritraj
9 Feb	Pepsi Grand Slam; Boca Raton, Florida, U.S. Clay – $300,000 – S4	(United States) John McEnroe; 6–7, 6–4, 6–0	(Argentina) Guillermo Vilas	(United States) Brian Teacher (United States) Vitas Gerulaitis	
16 Feb	Grand Marnier Tennis Games; La Quinta, California, U.S. Hard – $175,000 – 64S/32D; Singles – Doubles	(United States) Jimmy Connors; 6–3, 7–6	(Czechoslovakia) Ivan Lendl	(United States) Eliot Teltscher (United States) Harold Solomon	(United States) Pat Du Pré (Czechoslovakia) Tomáš Šmíd (United States) Brian Gottfried (United States) Roscoe Tanner
16 Feb	Grand Marnier Tennis Games; La Quinta, California, U.S. Hard – $175,000 – 64S/32D; Singles – Doubles	(United States) Brian Teacher (United States) Bruce Manson; 7–6, 6–2	(United States) Terry Moor (United States) Eliot Teltscher	(United States) Eliot Teltscher (United States) Harold Solomon	(United States) Pat Du Pré (Czechoslovakia) Tomáš Šmíd (United States) Brian Gottfried (United States) Roscoe Tanner
23 Feb	U.S. National Indoor Championships; Memphis, Tennessee, U.S. Carpet (i) – $200,000 – 48S / 24D	(United States) Gene Mayer; 6–2, 6–4	(United States) Roscoe Tanner	(United States) Tom Gullikson (France) Yannick Noah	(United States) Terry Moor (United States) Harold Solomon (United States) Fritz Buehning (United States) Peter Fleming
23 Feb	U.S. National Indoor Championships; Memphis, Tennessee, U.S. Carpet (i) – $200,000 – 48S / 24D	(United States) Sandy Mayer (United States) Gene Mayer; 7–6^{(7–3)}, 6–7^{(5–7)}, 7–6^{(7–5)}	(United States) Mike Cahill (United States) Tom Gullikson	(United States) Tom Gullikson (France) Yannick Noah	(United States) Terry Moor (United States) Harold Solomon (United States) Fritz Buehning (United States) Peter Fleming
23 Feb	Copa Capistrano; Mexico City, Mexico; Clay – $75,000 – 32S/16D	(Chile) Jaime Fillol; 6–2, 6–3	(Australia) David Carter	(United States) Steve Krulevitz (Mexico) Adolfo González	(United States) Tom Cain (United States) John Hayes (West Germany) Klaus Eberhard (Australia) Ross Case
23 Feb	Copa Capistrano; Mexico City, Mexico; Clay – $75,000 – 32S/16D	(United States) Chris Dunk (United States) Marty Davis; 6–3, 6–4	(Australia) John Alexander (Australia) Ross Case	(United States) Steve Krulevitz (Mexico) Adolfo González	(United States) Tom Cain (United States) John Hayes (West Germany) Klaus Eberhard (Australia) Ross Case

=== March ===
Week	Tournament	Champions	Runners-up	Semifinalists	Quarterfinalists
2 Mar	United Bank Classic; Denver, U.S. Carpet (i) – $125,000 – 32S/16D	(United States) Gene Mayer; 6–4, 6–4	(United States) John Sadri	(United States) Mel Purcell (United States) Fritz Buehning	(United States) Bruce Manson (United States) Terry Moor (United States) Tony Giammalva (Romania) Ilie Năstase
2 Mar	United Bank Classic; Denver, U.S. Carpet (i) – $125,000 – 32S/16D	(United States) Butch Walts (Zimbabwe) Andrew Pattison; 6–3, 6–4	(United States) Mel Purcell (United States) Dick Stockton	(United States) Mel Purcell (United States) Fritz Buehning	(United States) Bruce Manson (United States) Terry Moor (United States) Tony Giammalva (Romania) Ilie Năstase
2 Mar	Davis Cup First Round; Munich, West Germany – carpet (i); Timișoara, Romania – hard (i); Brighton, England – carpet (i); Seoul, South Korea – clay Yokohama, Japan – carpet (i); Lyon, France – carpet (i); Zürich, Switzerland – hard (i); Carlsbad, CA, United States – hard	First Round Winners; Argentina 3–2; Romania 3–2; Great Britain 3–2; New Zealand 5–0; Sweden 5–0; Australia 3–2; Czechoslovakia 3–2; United States 3–2	First Round Losers; West Germany; Brazil; Italy; South Korea; Japan; France; Switzerland; Mexico		
9 Mar	Belgian Indoor Championships WCT; Brussels, Belgium; Carpet (i) – $175,000 – 32S/16D	(United States) Jimmy Connors; 6–2, 6–4, 6–3	(United States) Brian Gottfried	(West Germany) Rolf Gehring (United States) Sandy Mayer	(India) Vijay Amritraj (United States) Peter Rennert (Australia) Kim Warwick (United States) Fritz Buehning
9 Mar	Belgian Indoor Championships WCT; Brussels, Belgium; Carpet (i) – $175,000 – 32S/16D	(South Africa) Frew McMillan (United States) Sandy Mayer; 4–6, 6–3, 6–3	(South Africa) Kevin Curren (United States) Steve Denton	(West Germany) Rolf Gehring (United States) Sandy Mayer	(India) Vijay Amritraj (United States) Peter Rennert (Australia) Kim Warwick (United States) Fritz Buehning
9 Mar	Egyptian Open; Cairo, Egypt; Clay – $75,000 – 32S/16D	(Argentina) Guillermo Vilas; 6–2, 6–3	(West Germany) Peter Elter	(Argentina) Ricardo Cano (Hungary) Balázs Taróczy	(France) Christophe Freyss (Egypt) Ismail El Shafei (Italy) Corrado Barazzutti (Spain) Ángel Giménez
9 Mar	Egyptian Open; Cairo, Egypt; Clay – $75,000 – 32S/16D	(Hungary) Balázs Taróczy (Egypt) Ismail El Shafei; 6–7, 6–3, 6–1	(Italy) Paolo Bertolucci (Italy) Gianni Ocleppo	(Argentina) Ricardo Cano (Hungary) Balázs Taróczy	(France) Christophe Freyss (Egypt) Ismail El Shafei (Italy) Corrado Barazzutti (Spain) Ángel Giménez
9 Mar	Robinson's Tennis Open; Tampa, Florida, U.S. Hard – $75,000 – 32S/16D	(United States) Mel Purcell; 4–6, 6–4, 6–3	(United States) Jeff Borowiak	(United States) Butch Walts (United States) Tom Gullikson	(United States) Robert Van't Hof (United States) Sammy Giammalva (Chile) Jaime Fillol (United States) Chris Mayotte
9 Mar	Robinson's Tennis Open; Tampa, Florida, U.S. Hard – $75,000 – 32S/16D	(United States) Butch Walts (South Africa) Bernard Mitton; 6–3, 3–6, 6–1	(Australia) David Carter (Australia) Paul Kronk	(United States) Butch Walts (United States) Tom Gullikson	(United States) Robert Van't Hof (United States) Sammy Giammalva (Chile) Jaime Fillol (United States) Chris Mayotte
16 Mar	Lorraine Open; Nancy, France; Hard (i) – $50,000 – 32S/16D	(Czechoslovakia) Pavel Složil; 6–2, 7–5	(Romania) Ilie Năstase	(Bolivia) Mario Martínez (Spain) José López-Maeso	(Israel) Shlomo Glickstein (France) Patrice Dominguez (France) Thierry Tulasne (Australia) Mark Edmondson
16 Mar	Lorraine Open; Nancy, France; Hard (i) – $50,000 – 32S/16D	(Italy) Adriano Panatta (Romania) Ilie Năstase; 6–4, 2–6, 6–4	(United Kingdom) John Feaver (Czechoslovakia) Jiří Hřebec	(Bolivia) Mario Martínez (Spain) José López-Maeso	(Israel) Shlomo Glickstein (France) Patrice Dominguez (France) Thierry Tulasne (Australia) Mark Edmondson
16 Mar	ABN World Tennis Tournament WCT; Rotterdam, Netherlands; Carpet (i) – $175,000 – 32S/16D; Singles	(United States) Jimmy Connors; 6–1, 2–6, 6–2	(United States) Gene Mayer	(United States) Brian Gottfried (Poland) Wojciech Fibak	(United States) Sandy Mayer (France) Yannick Noah (Mexico) Raúl Ramírez (United Kingdom) Buster Mottram
16 Mar	ABN World Tennis Tournament WCT; Rotterdam, Netherlands; Carpet (i) – $175,000 – 32S/16D; Singles	(United States) Fritz Buehning (United States) Ferdi Taygan; 7–6, 1–6, 6–4	(United States) Gene Mayer (United States) Sandy Mayer	(United States) Brian Gottfried (Poland) Wojciech Fibak	(United States) Sandy Mayer (France) Yannick Noah (Mexico) Raúl Ramírez (United Kingdom) Buster Mottram
23 Mar	Cuore Cup WCT; Milan, Italy; Carpet (i) – $175,000 – 32S/16D; Singles – Doubles	(United States) John McEnroe; 7–6^{(7–2)}, 6–4	(Sweden) Björn Borg	(Italy) Gianni Ocleppo (United States) Sandy Mayer	(United States) Stan Smith (United States) Gene Mayer (United States) Butch Walts (India) Vijay Amritraj
23 Mar	Cuore Cup WCT; Milan, Italy; Carpet (i) – $175,000 – 32S/16D; Singles – Doubles	(Mexico) Raúl Ramírez (United States) Brian Gottfried; 7–6, 6–3	(United States) John McEnroe (United States) Peter Rennert	(Italy) Gianni Ocleppo (United States) Sandy Mayer	(United States) Stan Smith (United States) Gene Mayer (United States) Butch Walts (India) Vijay Amritraj
23 Mar	Napa, California, U.S. Hard – $50,000 – 32S/16D	(United States) Sammy Giammalva; 6–3, 5–7, 6–1	(United States) Scott Davis	(United States) Hank Pfister (United States) Bruce Manson	(United States) Roscoe Tanner (United States) John Hayes (South Africa) Bernard Mitton (United States) Tim Mayotte
23 Mar	Napa, California, U.S. Hard – $50,000 – 32S/16D	(United States) Chris Mayotte (United States) Richard Meyer; 6–3, 3–6, 7–6	(United States) Tracy Delatte (United States) John Hayes	(United States) Hank Pfister (United States) Bruce Manson	(United States) Roscoe Tanner (United States) John Hayes (South Africa) Bernard Mitton (United States) Tim Mayotte
23 Mar	German Indoor Championships; Stuttgart, West Germany; Hard (i) – $75,000 – 32S/16D	(Czechoslovakia) Ivan Lendl; 6–3, 6–0, 6–7, 6–3	(New Zealand) Chris Lewis	(Poland) Wojciech Fibak (Israel) Shlomo Glickstein	(Australia) John Fitzgerald (France) Paul Torre (United States) Pat Du Pré (Sweden) Jan Norback
23 Mar	German Indoor Championships; Stuttgart, West Germany; Hard (i) – $75,000 – 32S/16D	(United States) Nick Saviano (United Kingdom) Buster Mottram; 3–6, 6–1, 6–2	(South Africa) Eddie Edwards (United States) Craig Edwards	(Poland) Wojciech Fibak (Israel) Shlomo Glickstein	(Australia) John Fitzgerald (France) Paul Torre (United States) Pat Du Pré (Sweden) Jan Norback
30 Mar	Trevira Cup WCT; Frankfurt, West Germany; Carpet (i) – $175,000 – 32S/16D	(United States) John McEnroe; 6–2, 6–3	(Czechoslovakia) Tomáš Šmíd	(United States) Stan Smith (Switzerland) Heinz Günthardt	(United States) Brian Teacher (Mexico) Raúl Ramírez (Romania) Ilie Năstase (United States) Robert Lutz
30 Mar	Trevira Cup WCT; Frankfurt, West Germany; Carpet (i) – $175,000 – 32S/16D	(United States) Butch Walts (United States) Brian Teacher; 7–5, 6–7, 7–5	(United States) Vitas Gerulaitis (United States) John McEnroe	(United States) Stan Smith (Switzerland) Heinz Günthardt	(United States) Brian Teacher (Mexico) Raúl Ramírez (Romania) Ilie Năstase (United States) Robert Lutz
30 Mar	Linz, Austria; Hard (i) – $50,000 – 32S/16D	(Italy) Gianni Ocleppo; 7–5, 6–1	(Australia) Mark Edmondson	(United States) Nick Saviano (New Zealand) Russell Simpson	(Netherlands) Louk Sanders (New Zealand) Chris Lewis (Belgium) Bernard Boileau (Austria) Robert Reininger
30 Mar	Linz, Austria; Hard (i) – $50,000 – 32S/16D	(Sweden) Hans Simonsson (Sweden) Anders Järryd; 6–4, 7–6	(Australia) Brad Drewett (Czechoslovakia) Pavel Složil	(United States) Nick Saviano (New Zealand) Russell Simpson	(Netherlands) Louk Sanders (New Zealand) Chris Lewis (Belgium) Bernard Boileau (Austria) Robert Reininger

=== April ===
Week	Tournament	Champions	Runners-up	Semifinalists	Quarterfinalists
6 Apr	Houston, Texas, U.S. Clay – $175,000 – 32S/16D	(Argentina) Guillermo Vilas; 6–2, 6–4	(United States) Sammy Giammalva	(Paraguay) Víctor Pecci (United States) Bruce Manson	(Spain) José Higueras (United States) Harold Solomon (United States) Eddie Dibbs (United States) Mel Purcell
6 Apr	Houston, Texas, U.S. Clay – $175,000 – 32S/16D	(United States) Sherwood Stewart (Australia) Mark Edmondson; 6–4, 6–3	(India) Anand Amritraj (United States) Fred McNair	(Paraguay) Víctor Pecci (United States) Bruce Manson	(Spain) José Higueras (United States) Harold Solomon (United States) Eddie Dibbs (United States) Mel Purcell
6 Apr	Johannesburg, South Africa; Hard – $75,000 – 32S/16D	(South Africa) Kevin Curren; 6–4, 6–4	(South Africa) Bernard Mitton	(Austria) Peter Feigl (Israel) Shlomo Glickstein	(South Africa) Tian Viljoen (South Africa) Deon Joubert (United States) Tony Graham (South Africa) Raymond Moore
6 Apr	Johannesburg, South Africa; Hard – $75,000 – 32S/16D	(South Africa) Raymond Moore (South Africa) Bernard Mitton; 7–5, 3–6, 6–1	(Israel) Shlomo Glickstein (South Africa) David Schneider	(Austria) Peter Feigl (Israel) Shlomo Glickstein	(South Africa) Tian Viljoen (South Africa) Deon Joubert (United States) Tony Graham (South Africa) Raymond Moore
6 Apr	Donnay Open; Nice, France; Clay – $50,000 – 32S/16D	(France) Yannick Noah; 6–4, 6–2	(Bolivia) Mario Martínez	(Spain) Manuel Orantes (Hungary) Balázs Taróczy	(France) Paul Torre (Socialist Federal Republic of Yugoslavia) Željko Franulović (Argentina) Ricardo Cano (Spain) Ángel Giménez
6 Apr	Donnay Open; Nice, France; Clay – $50,000 – 32S/16D	(France) Pascal Portes (France) Yannick Noah; 4–6, 6–3, 6–4	(New Zealand) Chris Lewis (Czechoslovakia) Pavel Složil	(Spain) Manuel Orantes (Hungary) Balázs Taróczy	(France) Paul Torre (Socialist Federal Republic of Yugoslavia) Željko Franulović (Argentina) Ricardo Cano (Spain) Ángel Giménez
13 Apr	Jack Kramer Open; Los Angeles, U.S. Hard – $75,000 – 32S/16D	(United States) John McEnroe; 6–7, 6–3, 6–3	(United States) Sandy Mayer	(United States) Bill Scanlon (United States) Nick Saviano	(United States) Stan Smith (United States) Walter Redondo (United States) Brian Teacher (United Kingdom) John Lloyd
13 Apr	Jack Kramer Open; Los Angeles, U.S. Hard – $75,000 – 32S/16D	(United States) Butch Walts (United States) Tom Gullikson; 6–4, 6–4	(United States) John McEnroe (United States) Ferdi Taygan	(United States) Bill Scanlon (United States) Nick Saviano	(United States) Stan Smith (United States) Walter Redondo (United States) Brian Teacher (United Kingdom) John Lloyd
13 Apr	Monte Carlo Open; Roquebrune-Cap-Martin, France; Clay – $250,000 – 32S/16D	No Winner	(United States) Jimmy Connors (Argentina) Guillermo Vilas; 5–5 Abandoned	(Italy) Adriano Panatta (Hungary) Balázs Taróczy	(Spain) José Higueras (Czechoslovakia) Tomáš Šmíd (Argentina) Ricardo Cano (France) Yannick Noah
13 Apr	Monte Carlo Open; Roquebrune-Cap-Martin, France; Clay – $250,000 – 32S/16D	(Hungary) Balázs Taróczy (Switzerland) Heinz Günthardt; 6–3, 6–3	(Czechoslovakia) Pavel Složil (Czechoslovakia) Tomáš Šmíd	(Italy) Adriano Panatta (Hungary) Balázs Taróczy	(Spain) José Higueras (Czechoslovakia) Tomáš Šmíd (Argentina) Ricardo Cano (France) Yannick Noah
20 Apr	Three Fives British Hard Court Championships; Bournemouth, England; Clay – $75,000 – 32S/16D	(Paraguay) Víctor Pecci; 6–3, 6–4	(Hungary) Balázs Taróczy	(Spain) Manuel Orantes (Czechoslovakia) Tomáš Šmíd	(United Kingdom) Buster Mottram (Argentina) Guillermo Aubone (France) Thierry Tulasne (France) Dominique Bedel
20 Apr	Three Fives British Hard Court Championships; Bournemouth, England; Clay – $75,000 – 32S/16D	(Paraguay) Víctor Pecci (Argentina) Ricardo Cano; 6–4, 3–6, 6–3	(United Kingdom) Buster Mottram (Czechoslovakia) Tomáš Šmíd	(Spain) Manuel Orantes (Czechoslovakia) Tomáš Šmíd	(United Kingdom) Buster Mottram (Argentina) Guillermo Aubone (France) Thierry Tulasne (France) Dominique Bedel
20 Apr	Alan King Tennis Classic; Las Vegas, Nevada, U.S. Hard – $300,000 – 32S/16D	(Czechoslovakia) Ivan Lendl; 6–4, 6–2	(United States) Harold Solomon	(United States) Brian Teacher (United States) Roscoe Tanner	(United States) Stan Smith (United States) Vitas Gerulaitis (United States) Brian Gottfried (United States) John Austin
20 Apr	Alan King Tennis Classic; Las Vegas, Nevada, U.S. Hard – $300,000 – 32S/16D	(United States) John McEnroe (United States) Peter Fleming; 6–3, 7–6	(United States) Tracy Delatte (United States) Trey Waltke	(United States) Brian Teacher (United States) Roscoe Tanner	(United States) Stan Smith (United States) Vitas Gerulaitis (United States) Brian Gottfried (United States) John Austin
28 Apr	Dallas WCT Finals; Dallas, Texas, U.S. Carpet (i) – $250,000 – S8	(United States) John McEnroe; 6–1, 6–2, 6–4	(South Africa) Johan Kriek	(United States) Brian Gottfried (United States) Roscoe Tanner	(United States) Sandy Mayer (United States) Sammy Giammalva (Poland) Wojciech Fibak (India) Vijay Amritraj

=== May ===
Week	Tournament	Champions	Runners-up	Semifinalists	Quarterfinalists
4 May	Nations Cup; Düsseldorf, West Germany; Clay – $430,000 – 16S/8D	Czechoslovakia; 2–1	Australia	United States; Argentina	West Germany; Spain; Italy; Sweden
11 May	Alitalia Open; Florence, Italy; Clay – $50,000 – 32S/16D	(Argentina) José Luis Clerc; 6–1, 6–2	(Mexico) Raúl Ramírez	(Czechoslovakia) Pavel Složil (France) Gilles Moretton	(Argentina) Fernando Dalla Fontana (Uruguay) Diego Pérez (Italy) Paolo Bertolucci (France) Patrick Proisy
11 May	Alitalia Open; Florence, Italy; Clay – $50,000 – 32S/16D	(Czechoslovakia) Pavel Složil (Mexico) Raúl Ramírez; 6–3, 3–6, 6–3	(Italy) Paolo Bertolucci (Italy) Adriano Panatta	(Czechoslovakia) Pavel Složil (France) Gilles Moretton	(Argentina) Fernando Dalla Fontana (Uruguay) Diego Pérez (Italy) Paolo Bertolucci (France) Patrick Proisy
11 May	German Open Championships; Hamburg, West Germany; Clay – $200,000 – 64S/32D	(Australia) Peter McNamara; 7–6, 6–1, 4–6, 6–4	(United States) Jimmy Connors	(Hungary) Balázs Taróczy (United States) Harold Solomon	(Czechoslovakia) Tomáš Šmíd (United States) Tony Giammalva (Spain) Ángel Giménez (Italy) Corrado Barazzutti
11 May	German Open Championships; Hamburg, West Germany; Clay – $200,000 – 64S/32D	(Ecuador) Andrés Gómez (Chile) Hans Gildemeister; 6–4, 3–6, 6–4	(Australia) Peter McNamara (Australia) Paul McNamee	(Hungary) Balázs Taróczy (United States) Harold Solomon	(Czechoslovakia) Tomáš Šmíd (United States) Tony Giammalva (Spain) Ángel Giménez (Italy) Corrado Barazzutti
18 May	Bavarian Tennis Championships; Munich, West Germany; Clay – $75,000 – 32S/16D; Singles – Doubles	(New Zealand) Chris Lewis; 4–6, 6–2, 2–6, 6–1, 6–1	(France) Christophe Roger-Vasselin	(West Germany) Ulrich Pinner (West Germany) Rolf Gehring	(Spain) Fernando Luna (Czechoslovakia) Pavel Složil (Israel) Shlomo Glickstein (United States) Butch Walts
18 May	Bavarian Tennis Championships; Munich, West Germany; Clay – $75,000 – 32S/16D; Singles – Doubles	(Australia) Paul Kronk (Australia) David Carter; 6–3, 6–4	(United States) Eric Fromm (Israel) Shlomo Glickstein	(West Germany) Ulrich Pinner (West Germany) Rolf Gehring	(Spain) Fernando Luna (Czechoslovakia) Pavel Složil (Israel) Shlomo Glickstein (United States) Butch Walts
18 May	Italian Open; Rome, Italy; Clay – $200,000 – 64S/32D	(Argentina) José Luis Clerc; 6–3, 6–4, 6–0	(Paraguay) Víctor Pecci	(Argentina) Guillermo Vilas (Czechoslovakia) Ivan Lendl	(Hungary) Balázs Taróczy (Australia) Peter McNamara (Italy) Adriano Panatta (United States) Eddie Dibbs
18 May	Italian Open; Rome, Italy; Clay – $200,000 – 64S/32D	(Ecuador) Andrés Gómez (Chile) Hans Gildemeister; 7–5, 6–2	(United States) Bruce Manson (Czechoslovakia) Tomáš Šmíd	(Argentina) Guillermo Vilas (Czechoslovakia) Ivan Lendl	(Hungary) Balázs Taróczy (Australia) Peter McNamara (Italy) Adriano Panatta (United States) Eddie Dibbs
25 May; 1 June	French Open; Paris, France; Grand Slam; Clay – $400,000 – 128S/64D/32XD; Singles – Doubles – Mixed doubles	(Sweden) Björn Borg; 6–1, 4–6, 6–2, 3–6, 6–1	(Czechoslovakia) Ivan Lendl	(Paraguay) Víctor Pecci (Argentina) José Luis Clerc	(Hungary) Balázs Taróczy (France) Yannick Noah (United States) John McEnroe (United States) Jimmy Connors
25 May; 1 June	French Open; Paris, France; Grand Slam; Clay – $400,000 – 128S/64D/32XD; Singles – Doubles – Mixed doubles	(Switzerland) Heinz Günthardt (Hungary) Balázs Taróczy; 6–2, 7–6, 6–3	(United States) Terry Moor (United States) Eliot Teltscher	(Paraguay) Víctor Pecci (Argentina) José Luis Clerc	(Hungary) Balázs Taróczy (France) Yannick Noah (United States) John McEnroe (United States) Jimmy Connors
25 May; 1 June	French Open; Paris, France; Grand Slam; Clay – $400,000 – 128S/64D/32XD; Singles – Doubles – Mixed doubles	(United States) Andrea Jaeger (United States) Jimmy Arias; 7–6, 6–4	(Netherlands) Betty Stöve (United States) Frederick McNair	(Paraguay) Víctor Pecci (Argentina) José Luis Clerc	(Hungary) Balázs Taróczy (France) Yannick Noah (United States) John McEnroe (United States) Jimmy Connors

=== June ===
Week	Tournament	Champions	Runners-up	Semifinalists	Quarterfinalists
8 Jun	Belgian International Championships; Brussels, Belgium; Clay – $50,000 – 32S/16D	(Socialist Federal Republic of Yugoslavia) Marko Ostoja; 4–6, 6–4, 7–5	(Ecuador) Ricardo Ycaza	(United States) Steve Krulevitz (Uruguay) Diego Pérez	(Italy) Adriano Panatta (Sweden) Per Hjertquist (Bolivia) Mario Martínez (Ecuador) Andrés Gómez
8 Jun	Belgian International Championships; Brussels, Belgium; Clay – $50,000 – 32S/16D	(Ecuador) Andrés Gómez (Argentina) Ricardo Cano; 6–2, 6–2	(Brazil) Carlos Kirmayr (Brazil) Cássio Motta	(United States) Steve Krulevitz (Uruguay) Diego Pérez	(Italy) Adriano Panatta (Sweden) Per Hjertquist (Bolivia) Mario Martínez (Ecuador) Andrés Gómez
8 Jun	Stella Artois Championships; London, England; Grass – $125,000 – 64S/32D; Singles – Doubles	(United States) John McEnroe; 7–6, 7–5	(United States) Brian Gottfried	(United States) Brian Teacher (United States) John Sadri	(United States) Hank Pfister (United States) Peter Rennert (South Africa) Eddie Edwards (South Africa) Kevin Curren
8 Jun	Stella Artois Championships; London, England; Grass – $125,000 – 64S/32D; Singles – Doubles	(United States) Brian Teacher (United States) Pat Du Pré; 3–6, 7–6, 11–9	(South Africa) Kevin Curren (United States) Steve Denton	(United States) Brian Teacher (United States) John Sadri	(United States) Hank Pfister (United States) Peter Rennert (South Africa) Eddie Edwards (South Africa) Kevin Curren
15 Jun	Bristol Open; Bristol, England; Grass – $75,000 – 32S/16D; Singles – Doubles	(Australia) Mark Edmondson; 6–3, 5–7, 6–4	(United States) Roscoe Tanner	(Australia) Paul McNamee (South Africa) Johan Kriek	(Australia) Phil Dent (United States) Tim Mayotte (New Zealand) Russell Simpson (United States) Tim Gullikson
15 Jun	Bristol Open; Bristol, England; Grass – $75,000 – 32S/16D; Singles – Doubles	(New Zealand) Russell Simpson (United States) Billy Martin; 6–3, 4–6, 6–4	(United States) John Austin (South Africa) Johan Kriek	(Australia) Paul McNamee (South Africa) Johan Kriek	(Australia) Phil Dent (United States) Tim Mayotte (New Zealand) Russell Simpson (United States) Tim Gullikson
15 Jun	Venice, Italy; Clay – $50,000 – 32S/16D	(Bolivia) Mario Martínez; 6–4, 6–4	(Italy) Paolo Bertolucci	(Chile) Pedro Rebolledo (Brazil) Marcos Hocevar	(Italy) Adriano Panatta (Uruguay) Diego Pérez (West Germany) Ulrich Pinner (Spain) José Higueras
22 Jun; 29 Jun	Wimbledon; London, England; Grand Slam; Grass – $388,008 – 128S/64D/48XD; Singles – Doubles – Mixed doubles	(United States) John McEnroe; 4–6, 7–6^{(7–1)}, 7–6^{(7–4)}, 6–4	(Sweden) Björn Borg	(United States) Jimmy Connors (Australia) Rod Frawley	(Australia) Peter McNamara (India) Vijay Amritraj (United States) Tim Mayotte (South Africa) Johan Kriek
22 Jun; 29 Jun	Wimbledon; London, England; Grand Slam; Grass – $388,008 – 128S/64D/48XD; Singles – Doubles – Mixed doubles	(United States) Peter Fleming (United States) John McEnroe; 6–4, 6–4, 6–4	(United States) Bob Lutz (United States) Stan Smith	(United States) Jimmy Connors (Australia) Rod Frawley	(Australia) Peter McNamara (India) Vijay Amritraj (United States) Tim Mayotte (South Africa) Johan Kriek
22 Jun; 29 Jun	Wimbledon; London, England; Grand Slam; Grass – $388,008 – 128S/64D/48XD; Singles – Doubles – Mixed doubles	(Netherlands) Betty Stöve (South Africa) Frew McMillan; 4–6, 7–6^{(7–2)}, 6–3	(United States) Tracy Austin (United States) John Austin	(United States) Jimmy Connors (Australia) Rod Frawley	(Australia) Peter McNamara (India) Vijay Amritraj (United States) Tim Mayotte (South Africa) Johan Kriek

=== July ===
Week	Tournament	Champions	Runners-up	Semifinalists	Quarterfinalists
6 Jul	Suisse Open; Gstaad, Switzerland; Clay – $125,000 – 32S/16D	(Poland) Wojciech Fibak; 6–1, 7–6	(France) Yannick Noah	(Brazil) Carlos Kirmayr (Switzerland) Heinz Günthardt	(Uruguay) José Luis Damiani (Brazil) Marcos Hocevar (Argentina) Fernando Dalla Fontana (Paraguay) Víctor Pecci
6 Jul	Suisse Open; Gstaad, Switzerland; Clay – $125,000 – 32S/16D	(Switzerland) Markus Günthardt (Switzerland) Heinz Günthardt; 6–4, 6–1	(Australia) David Carter (Australia) Paul Kronk	(Brazil) Carlos Kirmayr (Switzerland) Heinz Günthardt	(Uruguay) José Luis Damiani (Brazil) Marcos Hocevar (Argentina) Fernando Dalla Fontana (Paraguay) Víctor Pecci
6 Jul	Newport, Rhode Island, U.S. Grass – $100,000 – 32S/16D	(South Africa) Johan Kriek; 3–6, 6–3, 7–5	(United States) Hank Pfister	(United States) Craig Wittus (United States) Erik van Dillen	(India) Anand Amritraj (Australia) Brad Drewett (United States) Tim Wilkison (United States) Jim Delaney
6 Jul	Newport, Rhode Island, U.S. Grass – $100,000 – 32S/16D	(United States) Erik van Dillen (Australia) Brad Drewett; 6–2, 6–4	(South Africa) Kevin Curren (United States) Billy Martin	(United States) Craig Wittus (United States) Erik van Dillen	(India) Anand Amritraj (Australia) Brad Drewett (United States) Tim Wilkison (United States) Jim Delaney
6 Jul	Davis Cup Quarterfinals; Timișoara, Romania – hard Christchurch, New Zealand – grass Båstad, Sweden – clay New York City, NY, U.S. – hard	Quarterfinal Winners; Argentina 3–2; Great Britain 4–1; Australia 3–1; United States 4–1	Quarterfinal Losers; Romania; New Zealand; Sweden; Czechoslovakia		
13 Jul	U.S. Pro Tennis Championships; Boston, Massachusetts, U.S. Clay – $175,000 – 64S/32D	(Argentina) José Luis Clerc; 0–6, 6–2, 6–2	(Chile) Hans Gildemeister	(United States) Eliot Teltscher (France) Bernard Fritz	(Spain) Manuel Orantes (Argentina) Ricardo Cano (Uruguay) José Luis Damiani (Spain) Ángel Giménez
13 Jul	U.S. Pro Tennis Championships; Boston, Massachusetts, U.S. Clay – $175,000 – 64S/32D	(Czechoslovakia) Pavel Složil (Mexico) Raúl Ramírez; 6–4, 7–6	(Chile) Hans Gildemeister (Ecuador) Andrés Gómez	(United States) Eliot Teltscher (France) Bernard Fritz	(Spain) Manuel Orantes (Argentina) Ricardo Cano (Uruguay) José Luis Damiani (Spain) Ángel Giménez
13 Jul	Kitzbühel, Austria; Clay – $75,000 – 64S/32D	(Australia) John Fitzgerald; 3–6, 6–3, 7–5	(Argentina) Guillermo Vilas	(United States) Vitas Gerulaitis (West Germany) Klaus Eberhard	(Sweden) Per Hjertquist (Spain) Fernando Luna (Poland) Wojciech Fibak (Paraguay) Víctor Pecci
13 Jul	Kitzbühel, Austria; Clay – $75,000 – 64S/32D	(Australia) Paul Kronk (Australia) David Carter; 7–6, 6–1	(Socialist Federal Republic of Yugoslavia) Marko Ostoja (Netherlands) Louk Sanders	(United States) Vitas Gerulaitis (West Germany) Klaus Eberhard	(Sweden) Per Hjertquist (Spain) Fernando Luna (Poland) Wojciech Fibak (Paraguay) Víctor Pecci
13 Jul	Mercedes Cup; Stuttgart, West Germany; Clay – $75,000 – 32S/16D	(Sweden) Björn Borg; 1–6, 7–6, 6–2, 6–4	(Czechoslovakia) Ivan Lendl	(West Germany) Andreas Maurer (Australia) Peter McNamara	(Australia) Paul McNamee (Zimbabwe) Haroon Ismail (Czechoslovakia) Tomáš Šmíd (Australia) Mark Edmondson
13 Jul	Mercedes Cup; Stuttgart, West Germany; Clay – $75,000 – 32S/16D	(Australia) Peter McNamara (Australia) Paul McNamee; 2–6, 6–4 7–6	(Australia) Mark Edmondson (United States) Mike Estep	(West Germany) Andreas Maurer (Australia) Peter McNamara	(Australia) Paul McNamee (Zimbabwe) Haroon Ismail (Czechoslovakia) Tomáš Šmíd (Australia) Mark Edmondson
20 Jul	Swedish Open Championships; Båstad, Sweden; Clay – $75,000 – 32S/16D; Singles – Doubles	(France) Thierry Tulasne; 6–2, 6–3	(Sweden) Anders Järryd	(Sweden) Joakim Nyström (Spain) Fernando Luna	(Australia) Peter McNamara (Australia) Mark Edmondson (Australia) John Fitzgerald (Australia) Paul McNamee
20 Jul	Swedish Open Championships; Båstad, Sweden; Clay – $75,000 – 32S/16D; Singles – Doubles	(Australia) John Fitzgerald (Australia) Mark Edmondson; 2–6, 7–5, 6–0	(Sweden) Anders Järryd (Sweden) Hans Simonsson	(Sweden) Joakim Nyström (Spain) Fernando Luna	(Australia) Peter McNamara (Australia) Mark Edmondson (Australia) John Fitzgerald (Australia) Paul McNamee
20 Jul	Dutch Open; Hilversum, Netherlands; Clay – $75,000 – 32S/16D; Singles – Doubles	(Hungary) Balázs Taróczy; 6–3, 6–7, 6–4	(Switzerland) Heinz Günthardt	(Poland) Wojciech Fibak (Switzerland) Roland Stadler	(United States) Erick Iskersky (Czechoslovakia) Tomáš Šmíd (Israel) Shlomo Glickstein (United States) Jeff Borowiak
20 Jul	Dutch Open; Hilversum, Netherlands; Clay – $75,000 – 32S/16D; Singles – Doubles	(Hungary) Balázs Taróczy (Switzerland) Heinz Günthardt; 6–0, 6–2	(South Africa) Raymond Moore (Zimbabwe) Andrew Pattison	(Poland) Wojciech Fibak (Switzerland) Roland Stadler	(United States) Erick Iskersky (Czechoslovakia) Tomáš Šmíd (Israel) Shlomo Glickstein (United States) Jeff Borowiak
20 Jul	Washington Star International; Washington, D.C., U.S. Clay – $175,000 – 64S/32D	(Argentina) José Luis Clerc; 7–5, 6–2	(Argentina) Guillermo Vilas	(Ecuador) Andrés Gómez (Czechoslovakia) Stanislav Birner	(Czechoslovakia) Ivan Lendl (Bolivia) Mario Martínez (Mexico) Raúl Ramírez (United States) Mel Purcell
20 Jul	Washington Star International; Washington, D.C., U.S. Clay – $175,000 – 64S/32D	(United States) Van Winitsky (Mexico) Raúl Ramírez; 5–7, 7–6^{(9–7)}, 7–6^{(8–6)}	(Czechoslovakia) Pavel Složil (United States) Ferdi Taygan	(Ecuador) Andrés Gómez (Czechoslovakia) Stanislav Birner	(Czechoslovakia) Ivan Lendl (Bolivia) Mario Martínez (Mexico) Raúl Ramírez (United States) Mel Purcell
27 Jul	Volvo International; North Conway, NH, U.S. Clay – $175,000 – 64S/32D; Singles – Doubles	(Argentina) José Luis Clerc; 6–3, 6–2	(Argentina) Guillermo Vilas	(United States) Eliot Teltscher (Czechoslovakia) Ivan Lendl	(Spain) José Higueras (Czechoslovakia) Pavel Složil (United States) Eddie Dibbs (United States) Harold Solomon
27 Jul	Volvo International; North Conway, NH, U.S. Clay – $175,000 – 64S/32D; Singles – Doubles	(Australia) Peter McNamara (Switzerland) Heinz Günthardt; 6–7, 7–5, 6–4	(Czechoslovakia) Pavel Složil (United States) Ferdi Taygan	(United States) Eliot Teltscher (Czechoslovakia) Ivan Lendl	(Spain) José Higueras (Czechoslovakia) Pavel Složil (United States) Eddie Dibbs (United States) Harold Solomon
27 Jul	South Orange, New Jersey, U.S. Clay – $75,000 – 64S/32D	(Israel) Shlomo Glickstein; 6–3, 5–7, 6–4	(United States) Dick Stockton	(Spain) Manuel Orantes (United States) Nick Saviano	(United States) Gene Mayer (Australia) Brad Drewett (United States) Jimmy Arias (France) Grégoire Rafaitin
27 Jul	South Orange, New Jersey, U.S. Clay – $75,000 – 64S/32D	(Zimbabwe) Andrew Pattison (United States) Fritz Buehning; 6–1, 6–4	(Israel) Shlomo Glickstein (South Africa) David Schneider	(Spain) Manuel Orantes (United States) Nick Saviano	(United States) Gene Mayer (Australia) Brad Drewett (United States) Jimmy Arias (France) Grégoire Rafaitin

=== August ===
Week	Tournament	Champions	Runners-up	Semifinalists	Quarterfinalists
3 Aug	National Revenue Tennis Classic; Columbus, Ohio, U.S. Hard – $75,000 – 32S/16D	(United States) Brian Teacher; 6–3, 6–2	(United States) John Austin	(United States) Nick Saviano (United States) Hank Pfister	(United States) Stan Smith (United States) Peter Fleming (United States) Tim Gullikson (Australia) Phil Dent
3 Aug	National Revenue Tennis Classic; Columbus, Ohio, U.S. Hard – $75,000 – 32S/16D	(United States) Brian Teacher (United States) Bruce Manson; 6–1, 6–1	(India) Anand Amritraj (India) Vijay Amritraj	(United States) Nick Saviano (United States) Hank Pfister	(United States) Stan Smith (United States) Peter Fleming (United States) Tim Gullikson (Australia) Phil Dent
3 Aug	U.S. Clay Court Championships; Indianapolis, Indiana, U.S. Clay – $200,000 – 64S/32D; Singles – Doubles	(Argentina) José Luis Clerc; 4–6, 6–4, 6–2	(Czechoslovakia) Ivan Lendl	(Argentina) Guillermo Vilas (Australia) John Alexander	(Uruguay) José Luis Damiani (Argentina) Ricardo Cano (France) Gilles Moretton (United States) Mel Purcell
3 Aug	U.S. Clay Court Championships; Indianapolis, Indiana, U.S. Clay – $200,000 – 64S/32D; Singles – Doubles	(United States) Steve Denton (South Africa) Kevin Curren; 6–3, 5–7, 7–5	(Mexico) Raúl Ramírez (United States) Van Winitsky	(Argentina) Guillermo Vilas (Australia) John Alexander	(Uruguay) José Luis Damiani (Argentina) Ricardo Cano (France) Gilles Moretton (United States) Mel Purcell
10 Aug	Cleveland, Ohio, U.S. Hard – $75,000 – 32S/16D	(United States) Gene Mayer; 6–1, 6–4	(United States) Dave Siegler	(United States) Rodney Harmon (United States) Hank Pfister	(United States) Ben Testerman (Puerto Rico) Ernie Fernandez (United States) Chris Dunk (Australia) Colin Dibley
10 Aug	Cleveland, Ohio, U.S. Hard – $75,000 – 32S/16D	(United States) Van Winitsky (United States) Erik van Dillen; 6–4, 5–7, 7–5	(Australia) Syd Ball (Australia) Ross Case	(United States) Rodney Harmon (United States) Hank Pfister	(United States) Ben Testerman (Puerto Rico) Ernie Fernandez (United States) Chris Dunk (Australia) Colin Dibley
10 Aug	Player's International; Montreal, Quebec, Canada; Hard – $200,000 – 64S/32D; Singles – Doubles	(Czechoslovakia) Ivan Lendl; 6–3, 6–2	(United States) Eliot Teltscher	(India) Vijay Amritraj (Israel) Shlomo Glickstein	(United States) Steve Denton (Switzerland) Heinz Günthardt (United States) Brian Teacher (India) Ramesh Krishnan
10 Aug	Player's International; Montreal, Quebec, Canada; Hard – $200,000 – 64S/32D; Singles – Doubles	(United States) Ferdi Taygan (Mexico) Raúl Ramírez; 2–6, 7–6, 6–4	(United States) Peter Fleming (United States) John McEnroe	(India) Vijay Amritraj (Israel) Shlomo Glickstein	(United States) Steve Denton (Switzerland) Heinz Günthardt (United States) Brian Teacher (India) Ramesh Krishnan
10 Aug	Stowe Grand Prix; Stowe, Vermont, U.S. Hard – $75,000 – 32S/16D; Singles – Doubles	(United States) Brian Gottfried; 6–3, 6–3	(United States) Tony Graham	(United States) Jimmy Arias (Socialist Federal Republic of Yugoslavia) Marko Ostoja	(South Africa) Johan Kriek (United States) Fritz Buehning (United States) Larry Stefanki (France) Gilles Moretton
10 Aug	Stowe Grand Prix; Stowe, Vermont, U.S. Hard – $75,000 – 32S/16D; Singles – Doubles	(United States) Larry Stefanki (South Africa) Johan Kriek; 2–6, 6–1, 6–2	(United States) Brian Gottfried (United States) Robert Lutz	(United States) Jimmy Arias (Socialist Federal Republic of Yugoslavia) Marko Ostoja	(South Africa) Johan Kriek (United States) Fritz Buehning (United States) Larry Stefanki (France) Gilles Moretton
17 Aug	Atlanta, Georgia, U.S. Hard – $75,000 – 32S/16D	(United States) Mel Purcell; 6–4, 6–2	(France) Gilles Moretton	(United States) Eliot Teltscher (United States) Fritz Buehning	(United States) Terry Moor (United States) Tim Mayotte (Australia) Phil Dent (United States) Tony Giammalva
17 Aug	Atlanta, Georgia, U.S. Hard – $75,000 – 32S/16D	(United States) Peter Fleming (United States) Fritz Buehning; 6–4, 4–6, 6–3	(United States) Tony Giammalva (United States) Sammy Giammalva	(United States) Eliot Teltscher (United States) Fritz Buehning	(United States) Terry Moor (United States) Tim Mayotte (Australia) Phil Dent (United States) Tony Giammalva
17 Aug	ATP Championships; Mason, Ohio, U.S. Hard – $200,000 – 64S/32D	(United States) John McEnroe; 6–3, 6–4	(New Zealand) Chris Lewis	(Mexico) Raúl Ramírez (United States) Stan Smith	(United States) Robert Lutz (France) Thierry Tulasne (United States) Bill Scanlon (United States) Vitas Gerulaitis
17 Aug	ATP Championships; Mason, Ohio, U.S. Hard – $200,000 – 64S/32D	(United States) Ferdi Taygan (United States) John McEnroe; 7–6, 6–3	(United States) Robert Lutz (United States) Stan Smith	(Mexico) Raúl Ramírez (United States) Stan Smith	(United States) Robert Lutz (France) Thierry Tulasne (United States) Bill Scanlon (United States) Vitas Gerulaitis
31 Aug; 7 Sep	US Open; Flushing Meadow, New York, U.S. Grand Slam; Hard – $440,000 – 128S/64D/32XD; Singles – Doubles – Mixed doubles	(United States) John McEnroe; 4–6, 6–2, 6–4, 6–3	(Sweden) Björn Borg	(United States) Vitas Gerulaitis (United States) Jimmy Connors	(India) Ramesh Krishnan (United States) Bruce Manson (United States) Eliot Teltscher (United States) Roscoe Tanner
31 Aug; 7 Sep	US Open; Flushing Meadow, New York, U.S. Grand Slam; Hard – $440,000 – 128S/64D/32XD; Singles – Doubles – Mixed doubles	(United States) John McEnroe (United States) Peter Fleming; Walkover	(Switzerland) Heinz Günthardt (Australia) Peter McNamara	(United States) Vitas Gerulaitis (United States) Jimmy Connors	(India) Ramesh Krishnan (United States) Bruce Manson (United States) Eliot Teltscher (United States) Roscoe Tanner
31 Aug; 7 Sep	US Open; Flushing Meadow, New York, U.S. Grand Slam; Hard – $440,000 – 128S/64D/32XD; Singles – Doubles – Mixed doubles	(United States) Anne Smith (South Africa) Kevin Curren; 6–4, 7–6^{(7–4)}	(United States) JoAnne Russell (United States) Steve Denton	(United States) Vitas Gerulaitis (United States) Jimmy Connors	(India) Ramesh Krishnan (United States) Bruce Manson (United States) Eliot Teltscher (United States) Roscoe Tanner

=== September ===
Week	Tournament	Champions	Runners-up	Semifinalists	Quarterfinalists
14 Sep	Campionati Internazionali di Sicilia; Palermo, Sicily, Italy; Clay – $75,000 – 32S/16D; Singles – Doubles	(Spain) Manuel Orantes; 6–4, 6–0, 6–0	(Chile) Pedro Rebolledo	(Spain) José Higueras (Italy) Corrado Barazzutti	(Chile) Alejandro Pierola (Bolivia) Mario Martínez (Chile) Jaime Fillol (Poland) Wojciech Fibak
14 Sep	Campionati Internazionali di Sicilia; Palermo, Sicily, Italy; Clay – $75,000 – 32S/16D; Singles – Doubles	(Uruguay) Diego Pérez (Uruguay) José Luis Damiani; 6–1, 6–4	(Chile) Jaime Fillol (Chile) Belus Prajoux	(Spain) José Higueras (Italy) Corrado Barazzutti	(Chile) Alejandro Pierola (Bolivia) Mario Martínez (Chile) Jaime Fillol (Poland) Wojciech Fibak
14 Sep	Sawgrass Doubles, Florida, U.S. Clay – $175,000 – D32	(Australia) Peter McNamara (Switzerland) Heinz Günthardt; 7–6, 3–6, 7–6, 5–7, 6–4	(United States) Robert Lutz (United States) Stan Smith	(Australia) Alexander / (Australia) Dent (United States) Cahill / (United States) Gullikson	(United States) Buehning / (United States) Taygan (India) Amritraj / (United States) McNair (United States) Stewart / (United States) Riessen (Ecuador) Gómez / (Chile) Gildemeister
21 Sep	Bordeaux, France; Clay – $75,000 – 32S/16D	(Ecuador) Andrés Gómez; 7–6, 7–6, 6–1	(France) Thierry Tulasne	(France) Pascal Portes (Spain) Fernando Luna	(France) Yannick Noah (United States) Jim Gurfein (Spain) Gabriel Urpí (United States) Erick Iskersky
21 Sep	Bordeaux, France; Clay – $75,000 – 32S/16D	(Chile) Belus Prajoux (Ecuador) Andrés Gómez; 7–5, 6–3	(United States) Jim Gurfein (Sweden) Anders Järryd	(France) Pascal Portes (Spain) Fernando Luna	(France) Yannick Noah (United States) Jim Gurfein (Spain) Gabriel Urpí (United States) Erick Iskersky
21 Sep	Geneva Open; Geneva, Switzerland; Clay – $75,000 – 32S/16D; Singles – Doubles	(Sweden) Björn Borg; 6–4, 6–3	(Czechoslovakia) Tomáš Šmíd	(Spain) Manuel Orantes (Sweden) Joakim Nyström	(Switzerland) Heinz Günthardt (Uruguay) José Luis Damiani (Ecuador) Ricardo Ycaza (Argentina) Ricardo Cano
21 Sep	Geneva Open; Geneva, Switzerland; Clay – $75,000 – 32S/16D; Singles – Doubles	(Hungary) Balázs Taróczy (Switzerland) Heinz Günthardt; 6–4, 3–6, 6–2	(Czechoslovakia) Pavel Složil (Czechoslovakia) Tomáš Šmíd	(Spain) Manuel Orantes (Sweden) Joakim Nyström	(Switzerland) Heinz Günthardt (Uruguay) José Luis Damiani (Ecuador) Ricardo Ycaza (Argentina) Ricardo Cano
21 Sep	Transamerica Open; San Francisco, California, U.S. Carpet (i) – $175,000 – 48S/24D	(United States) Eliot Teltscher; 6–3, 7–6	(United States) Brian Teacher	(United States) Bill Scanlon (India) Vijay Amritraj	(United States) John McEnroe (United States) Tim Mayotte (United States) Pat Du Pré (United States) Jimmy Connors
21 Sep	Transamerica Open; San Francisco, California, U.S. Carpet (i) – $175,000 – 48S/24D	(United States) John McEnroe (United States) Peter Fleming; 7–6, 6–4	(Australia) Mark Edmondson (United States) Sherwood Stewart	(United States) Bill Scanlon (India) Vijay Amritraj	(United States) John McEnroe (United States) Tim Mayotte (United States) Pat Du Pré (United States) Jimmy Connors
28 Sep	Madrid Grand Prix; Madrid, Spain; Clay – $75,000 – 32S/16D	(Czechoslovakia) Ivan Lendl; 6–3, 6–2, 6–2	(Peru) Pablo Arraya	(Ecuador) Andrés Gómez (Spain) José López-Maeso	(Sweden) Joakim Nyström (Chile) Jaime Fillol (Czechoslovakia) Tomáš Šmíd (Chile) Pedro Rebolledo
28 Sep	Madrid Grand Prix; Madrid, Spain; Clay – $75,000 – 32S/16D	(Ecuador) Andrés Gómez (Chile) Hans Gildemeister; 6–2, 3–6, 6–3	(Switzerland) Heinz Günthardt (Czechoslovakia) Tomáš Šmíd	(Ecuador) Andrés Gómez (Spain) José López-Maeso	(Sweden) Joakim Nyström (Chile) Jaime Fillol (Czechoslovakia) Tomáš Šmíd (Chile) Pedro Rebolledo
28 Sep	Maui Pro Tennis Classic; Maui, Hawaii, U.S. Hard – $50,000 – 32S/16D	(United States) Hank Pfister; 6–4, 6–4	(United States) Tim Mayotte	(United States) Bill Scanlon (Australia) John Alexander	(United States) Brad Gilbert (United States) Nick Saviano (United States) Tom Gullikson (United States) Tom Leonard
28 Sep	Maui Pro Tennis Classic; Maui, Hawaii, U.S. Hard – $50,000 – 32S/16D	(United States) Matt Mitchell (United States) Tony Graham; 6–3, 3–6, 7–6	(Australia) John Alexander (United States) James Delaney	(United States) Bill Scanlon (Australia) John Alexander	(United States) Brad Gilbert (United States) Nick Saviano (United States) Tom Gullikson (United States) Tom Leonard
28 Sep	Davis Cup Semifinals; Buenos Aires, Argentina – clay Portland, OR, United States – carpet (i)	Semifinal Winners; Argentina 5–0; United States 5–0	Semifinal Losers; Great Britain; Australia		

=== October ===
Week	Tournament	Champions	Runners-up	Semifinalists	Quarterfinalists
5 Oct	Torneo Godó; Barcelona, Spain; Clay – $175,000 – 64S/32D; Singles – Doubles	(Czechoslovakia) Ivan Lendl; 6–0, 6–3, 6–0	(Argentina) Guillermo Vilas	(France) Yannick Noah (United States) Eddie Dibbs	(Italy) Adriano Panatta (Czechoslovakia) Tomáš Šmíd (Chile) Pedro Rebolledo (Hungary) Balázs Taróczy
5 Oct	Torneo Godó; Barcelona, Spain; Clay – $175,000 – 64S/32D; Singles – Doubles	(Sweden) Hans Simonsson (Sweden) Anders Järryd; 6–1, 6–4	(Chile) Hans Gildemeister (Ecuador) Andrés Gómez	(France) Yannick Noah (United States) Eddie Dibbs	(Italy) Adriano Panatta (Czechoslovakia) Tomáš Šmíd (Chile) Pedro Rebolledo (Hungary) Balázs Taróczy
5 Oct	Nivea Tennis Classic; Brisbane, Australia; Grass – $50,000 – 32S/16D	(Australia) Mark Edmondson; 7–6, 3–6, 6–4	(New Zealand) Chris Lewis	(Australia) Phil Dent (Australia) Rod Frawley	(Australia) Syd Ball (Australia) John Alexander (Australia) Charlie Fancutt (Australia) Brad Guan
5 Oct	Nivea Tennis Classic; Brisbane, Australia; Grass – $50,000 – 32S/16D	(New Zealand) Chris Lewis (Australia) Rod Frawley; 7–5, 4–6, 7–6^{(7–4)}	(Australia) Mark Edmondson (United States) Mike Estep	(Australia) Phil Dent (Australia) Rod Frawley	(Australia) Syd Ball (Australia) John Alexander (Australia) Charlie Fancutt (Australia) Brad Guan
5 Oct	Tel Aviv Open; Tel Aviv, Israel; Hard – $75,000 – 32S/16D; Singles – Doubles	(United States) Mel Purcell; 6–1, 6–1	(Sweden) Per Hjertquist	(United States) Steve Krulevitz (West Germany) Klaus Eberhard	(Netherlands) Eric Wilborts (United States) Vince Van Patten (United States) Dick Stockton (Israel) Shlomo Glickstein
5 Oct	Tel Aviv Open; Tel Aviv, Israel; Hard – $75,000 – 32S/16D; Singles – Doubles	(United States) Van Winitsky (United States) Steve Meister; 3–6, 6–3, 6–3	(United Kingdom) John Feaver (United States) Steve Krulevitz	(United States) Steve Krulevitz (West Germany) Klaus Eberhard	(Netherlands) Eric Wilborts (United States) Vince Van Patten (United States) Dick Stockton (Israel) Shlomo Glickstein
12 Oct	Swiss Indoors; Basel, Switzerland; Hard (i) – $75,000 – 32S/16D	(Czechoslovakia) Ivan Lendl; 6–2, 6–3, 6–0	(Argentina) José Luis Clerc	(Switzerland) Heinz Günthardt (United States) Trey Waltke	(United States) Eddie Dibbs (Ecuador) Andrés Gómez (United States) Sammy Giammalva (United States) Steve Krulevitz
12 Oct	Swiss Indoors; Basel, Switzerland; Hard (i) – $75,000 – 32S/16D	(Romania) Ilie Năstase (Argentina) José Luis Clerc; 7–6, 6–7, 7–6	(Switzerland) Markus Günthardt (Czechoslovakia) Pavel Složil	(Switzerland) Heinz Günthardt (United States) Trey Waltke	(United States) Eddie Dibbs (Ecuador) Andrés Gómez (United States) Sammy Giammalva (United States) Steve Krulevitz
12 Oct	Sydney Indoor; Sydney, Australia; Hard (i) – $175,000 – 32S/16D; Singles – Doubles	(United States) John McEnroe; 6–4, 7–5, 6–2	(United States) Roscoe Tanner	(United States) Eliot Teltscher (Australia) John Fitzgerald	(United States) Tom Gullikson (United States) Vitas Gerulaitis (Australia) Peter McNamara (Paraguay) Víctor Pecci
12 Oct	Sydney Indoor; Sydney, Australia; Hard (i) – $175,000 – 32S/16D; Singles – Doubles	(United States) Peter Fleming (United States) John McEnroe; 6–7, 7–6, 6–1	(United States) Sherwood Stewart (United States) Ferdi Taygan	(United States) Eliot Teltscher (Australia) John Fitzgerald	(United States) Tom Gullikson (United States) Vitas Gerulaitis (Australia) Peter McNamara (Paraguay) Víctor Pecci
19 Oct	Miracle Indoor Championships; Melbourne, Australia; Hard (i) – $125,000 – 32S/16D	(Australia) Peter McNamara; 6–4, 1–6, 5–5, def.	(United States) Vitas Gerulaitis	(Australia) Chris Johnstone (New Zealand) Chris Lewis	(Australia) Phil Dent (Paraguay) Víctor Pecci (Australia) John Fitzgerald (Australia) Mark Edmondson
19 Oct	Miracle Indoor Championships; Melbourne, Australia; Hard (i) – $125,000 – 32S/16D	(Australia) Peter McNamara (Australia) Paul Kronk; 3–6, 6–3, 6–4	(United States) Sherwood Stewart (United States) Ferdi Taygan	(Australia) Chris Johnstone (New Zealand) Chris Lewis	(Australia) Phil Dent (Paraguay) Víctor Pecci (Australia) John Fitzgerald (Australia) Mark Edmondson
19 Oct	Japan Open; Tokyo, Japan; Clay – $125,000 – 64S/32D; Singles – Doubles	(Hungary) Balázs Taróczy; 6–3, 1–6, 7–6	(United States) Eliot Teltscher	(United States) Van Winitsky (United States) Pat Du Pré	(United States) Terry Moor (United States) Mel Purcell (Poland) Wojciech Fibak (Argentina) Ricardo Cano
19 Oct	Japan Open; Tokyo, Japan; Clay – $125,000 – 64S/32D; Singles – Doubles	(Hungary) Balázs Taróczy (Switzerland) Heinz Günthardt; 3–6, 6–2, 6–1	(United States) Larry Stefanki (United States) Robert Van't Hof	(United States) Van Winitsky (United States) Pat Du Pré	(United States) Terry Moor (United States) Mel Purcell (Poland) Wojciech Fibak (Argentina) Ricardo Cano
19 Oct	Vienna Indoor; Vienna, Austria; Hard (i) – $125,000 – 64S/32D; Singles – Doubles	(Czechoslovakia) Ivan Lendl; 1–6, 6–0, 6–1, 6–2	(United States) Brian Gottfried	(Czechoslovakia) Tomáš Šmíd (United States) Stan Smith	(United States) Sandy Mayer (France) Jérôme Potier (West Germany) Rolf Gehring (Brazil) Carlos Kirmayr
19 Oct	Vienna Indoor; Vienna, Austria; Hard (i) – $125,000 – 64S/32D; Singles – Doubles	(United States) Tim Wilkison (United States) Steve Denton; 4–6, 6–3, 6–4	(United States) Sammy Giammalva (United States) Fred McNair	(Czechoslovakia) Tomáš Šmíd (United States) Stan Smith	(United States) Sandy Mayer (France) Jérôme Potier (West Germany) Rolf Gehring (Brazil) Carlos Kirmayr
26 Oct	Lacoste Cup; Cologne, Germany; Hard (i) – $75,000 – 32S/16D	(Czechoslovakia) Ivan Lendl; 6–3, 6–3	(United States) Sandy Mayer	(United States) Sammy Giammalva (Czechoslovakia) Tomáš Šmíd	(Zimbabwe) Andrew Pattison (South Africa) Eddie Edwards (United States) Tim Wilkison (South Africa) Kevin Curren
26 Oct	Lacoste Cup; Cologne, Germany; Hard (i) – $75,000 – 32S/16D	(United States) Sandy Mayer (South Africa) Frew McMillan; 6–0, 6–4 (Note: Doubles event not listed by ATP.)	(Czechoslovakia) Jan Kodeš (Germany) Karl Meiler	(United States) Sammy Giammalva (Czechoslovakia) Tomáš Šmíd	(Zimbabwe) Andrew Pattison (South Africa) Eddie Edwards (United States) Tim Wilkison (South Africa) Kevin Curren
26 Oct	Paris Open; Paris, France; Hard (i) – $50,000 – 32S/16D; Singles – Doubles	(United States) Mark Vines; 6–2, 6–4, 6–3	(France) Pascal Portes	(France) Yannick Noah (United States) Stan Smith	(Romania) Ilie Năstase (United Kingdom) Richard Lewis (France) Jérôme Potier (United States) Brian Gottfried
26 Oct	Paris Open; Paris, France; Hard (i) – $50,000 – 32S/16D; Singles – Doubles	(France) Yannick Noah (Romania) Ilie Năstase; 6–4, 6–4	(United Kingdom) Andrew Jarrett (United Kingdom) Jonathan Smith	(France) Yannick Noah (United States) Stan Smith	(Romania) Ilie Năstase (United Kingdom) Richard Lewis (France) Jérôme Potier (United States) Brian Gottfried
26 Oct	Seiko World Super Tennis; Tokyo, Japan; Carpet (i) – $300,000 – 32S/16D; Singles – Doubles	(United States) Vincent Van Patten; 6–2, 3–6, 6–3	(Australia) Mark Edmondson	(United States) John McEnroe (Switzerland) Heinz Günthardt	(United States) Bill Scanlon (United States) Vitas Gerulaitis (Poland) Wojciech Fibak (United States) Tim Gullikson
26 Oct	Seiko World Super Tennis; Tokyo, Japan; Carpet (i) – $300,000 – 32S/16D; Singles – Doubles	(United States) Hank Pfister (United States) Victor Amaya; 6–4, 6–2	(Switzerland) Heinz Günthardt (Hungary) Balázs Taróczy	(United States) John McEnroe (Switzerland) Heinz Günthardt	(United States) Bill Scanlon (United States) Vitas Gerulaitis (Poland) Wojciech Fibak (United States) Tim Gullikson

=== November ===
Week	Tournament	Champions	Runners-up	Semifinalists	Quarterfinalists
2 Nov	Seiko Hong Kong Classic; Hong Kong; Hard – $75,000 – 32S/16D; Singles – Doubles	(United States) Van Winitsky; 6–4, 6–7^{(7–9)}, 6–4	(Australia) Mark Edmondson	(United States) Marty Davis (United States) Tim Gullikson	(United States) Lloyd Bourne (United States) Bruce Manson (New Zealand) Chris Lewis (United States) John Sadri
2 Nov	Seiko Hong Kong Classic; Hong Kong; Hard – $75,000 – 32S/16D; Singles – Doubles	(United States) Chris Mayotte (United States) Chris Dunk; 6–4, 7–6	(United States) Marty Davis (Australia) Brad Drewett	(United States) Marty Davis (United States) Tim Gullikson	(United States) Lloyd Bourne (United States) Bruce Manson (New Zealand) Chris Lewis (United States) John Sadri
2 Nov	Quito Grand Prix; Quito, Ecuador; Clay – $75,000 – 32S/16D	(United States) Eddie Dibbs; 3–6, 6–0, 7–5	(Australia) David Carter	(Ecuador) Andrés Gómez (Chile) Hans Gildemeister	(Argentina) José Luis Clerc (Spain) Manuel Orantes (Ecuador) Ricardo Ycaza (Paraguay) Víctor Pecci
2 Nov	Quito Grand Prix; Quito, Ecuador; Clay – $75,000 – 32S/16D	(Ecuador) Andrés Gómez (Chile) Hans Gildemeister; 7–5, 6–3	(Australia) David Carter (Ecuador) Ricardo Ycaza	(Ecuador) Andrés Gómez (Chile) Hans Gildemeister	(Argentina) José Luis Clerc (Spain) Manuel Orantes (Ecuador) Ricardo Ycaza (Paraguay) Víctor Pecci
2 Nov	Stockholm Open; Stockholm, Sweden; Hard (i) – $200,000 – 64S/32D; Singles – Doubles	(United States) Gene Mayer; 6–4, 6–2	(United States) Sandy Mayer	(United States) Jimmy Connors (United States) Hank Pfister	(United States) Nick Saviano (West Germany) Peter Elter (Sweden) Mats Wilander (Republic of Ireland) Matt Doyle
2 Nov	Stockholm Open; Stockholm, Sweden; Hard (i) – $200,000 – 64S/32D; Singles – Doubles	(United States) Steve Denton (South Africa) Kevin Curren; 6–7, 6–4, 6–0	(United States) Sherwood Stewart (United States) Ferdi Taygan	(United States) Jimmy Connors (United States) Hank Pfister	(United States) Nick Saviano (West Germany) Peter Elter (Sweden) Mats Wilander (Republic of Ireland) Matt Doyle
9 Nov	Taipei International Championships; Taipei, Taiwan; Carpet (i)– $75,000 – 32S/16D; Singles – Doubles	(United States) Robert Van't Hof; 7–5, 6–2	(United States) Pat Du Pré	(Australia) Mark Edmondson (Australia) Paul McNamee	(Switzerland) Ivan Dupasquier (United States) Tim Gullikson (United States) Mike Estep (Australia) Rod Frawley
9 Nov	Taipei International Championships; Taipei, Taiwan; Carpet (i)– $75,000 – 32S/16D; Singles – Doubles	(United States) John Benson (United States) Mike Bauer; 6–4, 6–3	(United States) John Austin (United States) Mike Cahill	(Australia) Mark Edmondson (Australia) Paul McNamee	(Switzerland) Ivan Dupasquier (United States) Tim Gullikson (United States) Mike Estep (Australia) Rod Frawley
9 Nov	Benson & Hedges Championships; Wembley London, England; Carpet (i) – $175,000 – 32S/16D; Singles – Doubles	(United States) Jimmy Connors; 3–6, 2–6, 6–3, 6–4, 6–2	(United States) John McEnroe	(United States) Sandy Mayer (France) Yannick Noah	(United States) Brian Gottfried (United States) Roscoe Tanner (United Kingdom) Richard Lewis (Israel) Shlomo Glickstein
9 Nov	Benson & Hedges Championships; Wembley London, England; Carpet (i) – $175,000 – 32S/16D; Singles – Doubles	(United States) Ferdi Taygan (United States) Sherwood Stewart; 7–5, 6–7, 6–4	(United States) John McEnroe (United States) Peter Fleming	(United States) Sandy Mayer (France) Yannick Noah	(United States) Brian Gottfried (United States) Roscoe Tanner (United Kingdom) Richard Lewis (Israel) Shlomo Glickstein
16 Nov	Bangkok, Thailand; Carpet (i) – $75,000 – 32S/16D	(United States) Bill Scanlon; 6–2, 6–3	(Sweden) Mats Wilander	(Sweden) Anders Järryd (India) Ramesh Krishnan	(India) Vijay Amritraj (United States) John Austin (United States) Chris Dunk (United States) Van Winitsky
16 Nov	Bangkok, Thailand; Carpet (i) – $75,000 – 32S/16D	(United States) Mike Cahill (United States) John Austin; 6–3, 7–6	(United States) Lloyd Bourne (United States) Van Winitsky	(Sweden) Anders Järryd (India) Ramesh Krishnan	(India) Vijay Amritraj (United States) John Austin (United States) Chris Dunk (United States) Van Winitsky
16 Nov	South American Championships; Buenos Aires, Argentina; Clay – $175,000 – 32S/16D; Singles – Doubles	(Czechoslovakia) Ivan Lendl; 6–1, 6–2	(Argentina) Guillermo Vilas	(Chile) Pedro Rebolledo (West Germany) Andreas Maurer	(Uruguay) Diego Pérez (Ecuador) Andrés Gómez (Spain) Juan Aguilera (West Germany) Rolf Gehring
16 Nov	South American Championships; Buenos Aires, Argentina; Clay – $175,000 – 32S/16D; Singles – Doubles	(Brazil) João Soares (Brazil) Marcos Hocevar; 7–6, 6–7, 6–4	(Chile) Jaime Fillol (Chile) Álvaro Fillol	(Chile) Pedro Rebolledo (West Germany) Andreas Maurer	(Uruguay) Diego Pérez (Ecuador) Andrés Gómez (Spain) Juan Aguilera (West Germany) Rolf Gehring
16 Nov	Italian Indoor Open; Bologna, Italy; Carpet (i) – $75,000 – 32S/16D	(United States) Sandy Mayer; 7–5, 6–3	(Romania) Ilie Năstase	(Italy) Corrado Barazzutti (Czechoslovakia) Tomáš Šmíd	(France) Yannick Noah (United States) Tim Mayotte (Czechoslovakia) Jiří Granát (Hungary) Balázs Taróczy
16 Nov	Italian Indoor Open; Bologna, Italy; Carpet (i) – $75,000 – 32S/16D	(France) Henri Leconte (United States) Sammy Giammalva; 7–6, 6–4	(Czechoslovakia) Tomáš Šmíd (Hungary) Balázs Taróczy	(Italy) Corrado Barazzutti (Czechoslovakia) Tomáš Šmíd	(France) Yannick Noah (United States) Tim Mayotte (Czechoslovakia) Jiří Granát (Hungary) Balázs Taróczy
23 Nov	South African Open; Johannesburg, South Africa; Hard – $300,000 – 32S/16D	(United States) Vitas Gerulaitis; 6–4, 7–6, 6–1	(United States) Jeff Borowiak	(United States) Steve Denton (Israel) Shlomo Glickstein	(Zimbabwe) Andrew Pattison (South Africa) Freddie Sauer (United States) Tom Gullikson (United Kingdom) Buster Mottram
23 Nov	South African Open; Johannesburg, South Africa; Hard – $300,000 – 32S/16D	(South Africa) John Yuill (United States) Terry Moor; 6–3, 5–7, 6–4, 6–7, 12–10	(United States) Fritz Buehning (New Zealand) Russell Simpson	(United States) Steve Denton (Israel) Shlomo Glickstein	(Zimbabwe) Andrew Pattison (South Africa) Freddie Sauer (United States) Tom Gullikson (United Kingdom) Buster Mottram
23 Nov	Philippine Classic; Manila, Philippines; Carpet (i) – $75,000 – 32S/16D	(India) Ramesh Krishnan; 6–4, 6–4	(Switzerland) Ivan Dupasquier	(Austria) Hans Kary (United States) Drew Gitlin	(United States) Mike Bauer (United States) Jim Gurfein (Australia) Charlie Fancutt (United States) Brad Gilbert
23 Nov	Philippine Classic; Manila, Philippines; Carpet (i) – $75,000 – 32S/16D	(United States) John Benson (United States) Mike Bauer; 6–4, 6–4	(United States) Drew Gitlin (United States) Jim Gurfein	(Austria) Hans Kary (United States) Drew Gitlin	(United States) Mike Bauer (United States) Jim Gurfein (Australia) Charlie Fancutt (United States) Brad Gilbert
23 Nov	Santiago International Championships; Santiago, Chile; Clay – $50,000 – 32S/16D	(Chile) Hans Gildemeister; 6–4, 7–5	(Ecuador) Andrés Gómez	(Spain) José López-Maeso (Spain) José Higueras	(Argentina) Carlos Castellan (Chile) Pedro Rebolledo (Spain) Sergio Casal (Argentina) Ricardo Cano
23 Nov	Santiago International Championships; Santiago, Chile; Clay – $50,000 – 32S/16D	(Ecuador) Andrés Gómez (Chile) Hans Gildemeister; 6–2, 7–6	(Argentina) Ricardo Cano (Chile) Belus Prajoux	(Spain) José López-Maeso (Spain) José Higueras	(Argentina) Carlos Castellan (Chile) Pedro Rebolledo (Spain) Sergio Casal (Argentina) Ricardo Cano

=== December ===
Week	Tournament	Champions	Runners-up	Semifinalists	Quarterfinalists
7 Dec	Davis Cup Final; Cincinnati, Ohio, United States; Carpet (i)	United States; 3–1	Argentina		
14 Dec	Sofia Open; Sofia, Bulgaria; Carpet (i) – $50,000 – 32S/16D	(United States) Rick Meyer; 6–4, 7–6, 7–6	(Finland) Leo Palin	(West Germany) Hans-Dieter Beutel (Romania) Florin Segărceanu	(West Germany) Christoph Zipf (France) Paul Torre (Bulgaria) Bozhidar Pampoulov (West Germany) Karl Meiler
14 Dec	Sofia Open; Sofia, Bulgaria; Carpet (i) – $50,000 – 32S/16D	(Czechoslovakia) Jiří Granát (East Germany) Thomas Emmrich; 7–6, 2–6, 6–4	(Egypt) Ismail El Shafei (United States) Richard Meyer	(West Germany) Hans-Dieter Beutel (Romania) Florin Segărceanu	(West Germany) Christoph Zipf (France) Paul Torre (Bulgaria) Bozhidar Pampoulov (West Germany) Karl Meiler
14 Dec	Sydney Outdoor; Sydney, Australia; Grass – $125,000 – 64S/32D	(United States) Tim Wilkison; 6–4, 7–6, 6–3	(New Zealand) Chris Lewis	(United States) Steve Denton (Australia) Mark Edmondson	(Australia) Phil Dent (United States) Hank Pfister (Australia) John Alexander (Australia) Chris Johnstone
14 Dec	Sydney Outdoor; Sydney, Australia; Grass – $125,000 – 64S/32D	(Australia) Peter McNamara (Australia) Paul McNamee; 6–7, 7–6, 7–6	(United States) Hank Pfister (United States) John Sadri	(United States) Steve Denton (Australia) Mark Edmondson	(Australia) Phil Dent (United States) Hank Pfister (Australia) John Alexander (Australia) Chris Johnstone
21 Dec; 28 Dec	Australian Open; Melbourne, Australia; Grand Slam; Grass – $350,000 – 64S/32D; Singles – Doubles	(South Africa) Johan Kriek; 6–2, 7–6^{(7–1)}, 6–7^{(1–7)}, 6–4	(United States) Steve Denton	(United States) Hank Pfister (Australia) Mark Edmondson	(Australia) Kim Warwick (Israel) Shlomo Glickstein (United States) Tim Mayotte (Australia) Peter McNamara
21 Dec; 28 Dec	Australian Open; Melbourne, Australia; Grand Slam; Grass – $350,000 – 64S/32D; Singles – Doubles	(Australia) Mark Edmondson (Australia) Kim Warwick; 6–3, 6–7, 6–3	(United States) Hank Pfister (United States) John Sadri	(United States) Hank Pfister (Australia) Mark Edmondson	(Australia) Kim Warwick (Israel) Shlomo Glickstein (United States) Tim Mayotte (Australia) Peter McNamara

=== January 1982 ===
Week	Tournament	Champions	Runners-up	Semifinalists	Quarterfinalists
11 Jan	Volvo Masters; New York, U.S. Grand Prix Masters; Carpet (i) – $400,000 – 8S/4D; Singles – Doubles	(Czechoslovakia) Ivan Lendl; 6–7^{(5–7)}, 2–6, 7–6^{(8–6)}, 6–2, 6–4.	(United States) Vitas Gerulaitis	(United States) Eliot Teltscher (United States) John McEnroe	Round Robin (United States) Roscoe Tanner (United States) Jimmy Connors (Argentina) Guillermo Vilas (Argentina) José Luis Clerc
11 Jan	Volvo Masters; New York, U.S. Grand Prix Masters; Carpet (i) – $400,000 – 8S/4D; Singles – Doubles	(United States) Peter Fleming (United States) John McEnroe; 6–3, 6–3	(South Africa) Kevin Curren (United States) Steve Denton	(United States) Eliot Teltscher (United States) John McEnroe	Round Robin (United States) Roscoe Tanner (United States) Jimmy Connors (Argentina) Guillermo Vilas (Argentina) José Luis Clerc

== Points system ==
The tournaments were divided into twelve point categories. The highest points were allocated to the Grand Slam tournaments; French Open, the Wimbledon Championships, the US Open and the Australian Open. Points were allocated based on these categories and the finishing position of a player in a tournament. The points table is based on a 32 player draw. Except for the Grand Slam events, the points shown here are based on 32 draw tournaments. For tournaments with prize money of $175,000 or more, the Grand Prix points shall be increased by one category for each additional 16 places in the draw up to a maximum increase of two additional categories. The maximum increase for Regular Series tournaments shall be one category. The points allocation, with doubles points listed in brackets, is as follows:

	Grand Slam	$300,000+	$275,000+	$250,000+	$225,000+	$200,000+	$175,000+	$150,000+	$125,000+	$100,000+	$75,000+	$50,000+
Category	1	2	3	4	5	6	7	8	9	10	11	12
Winner	350 (70)	300 (60)	275 (55)	250 (50)	225 (45)	200 (40)	175 (35)	150 (30)	125 (25)	100 (20)	75 (15)	50 (10)
Runner-up	245 (49)	210 (42)	192 (38)	175 (35)	157 (31)	140 (28)	122 (24)	104 (20)	87 (17)	70 (14)	52 (10)	35 (7)
Semifinalist	140 (28)	120 (24)	110 (22)	100 (20)	90 (18)	80 (16)	70 (14)	60 (12)	50 (10)	40 (8)	30 (6)	20 (4)
Quarterfinalist	70 (14)	60 (12)	55 (11)	50 (10)	45 (9)	40 (8)	35 (7)	30 (6)	25 (5)	20 (4)	15 (3)	10 (2)
Fourth round	35 (7)	30 (6)	27 (6)	25 (5)	22 (5)	20 (4)	17 (3)	14 (3)	12 (2)	10 (2)	7 (–)	5 (–)
Third round	17 (3)	15 (–)	13 (–)	12 (–)	11 (–)	10 (–)	9 (–)	7 (–)	6 (–)	5 (–)	– (–)	– (–)
Second round	9 (–)	– (–)	– (–)	– (–)	– (–)	– (–)	– (–)	– (–)	– (–)	– (–)	– (–)	– (–)

== Top tournaments ranked by Grand Prix points & prize money ==
Tournament	Prize money	Category
The four Grand Slam tournaments		1
Volvo Masters	$400,000	
Las Vegas	$300,000 (32 draw)	2
Tokyo	$300,000 (32 draw)	2
South African Open	$300,000 (32 draw)	2
Philadelphia	$250,000 (48 draw)	3
Monte Carlo	$250,000 (32 draw)	4
Italian Open	$200,000 (64 draw)	4
German Open	$200,000 (64 draw)	4
Indianapolis	$200,000 (64 draw)	4
Canadian Open	$200,000 (64 draw)	4
Cincinnati	$200,000 (64 draw)	4
Stockholm Open	$200,000 (64 drsw)	4

== Grand Prix standings ==
Rk	Name	Points	Bonus
1	Ivan Lendl (TCH)	2,413	$300,000
2	John McEnroe (USA)	2,095	$200,000
3	Jimmy Connors (USA)	1,717	$150,000
4	José Luis Clerc (ARG)	1,514	$100,000
5	Guillermo Vilas (ARG)	1,473	$80,000
6	Björn Borg (SWE)	1,159	— (Note: Borg did not play a sufficient amount of tournaments to qualify for a bonus.)
7	Roscoe Tanner (USA)	1,100	$60,000
8	Eliot Teltscher (USA)	1,070	$50,000
9	Vitas Gerulaitis (USA)	1,050	$40,000
10	Yannick Noah (FRA)	965	$35,000

== ATP rankings ==
As of January 1981
Rk	Name	Nation
1	Björn Borg	SWE
2	John McEnroe	USA
3	Jimmy Connors	USA
4	Gene Mayer	USA
5	Guillermo Vilas	ARG
6	Ivan Lendl	TCH
7	Harold Solomon	USA
8	José Luis Clerc	ARG
9	Vitas Gerulaitis	USA
10	Eliot Teltscher	USA
11	Brian Gottfried	USA
12	Brian Teacher	USA
13	Eddie Dibbs	USA
14	Roscoe Tanner	USA
15	Wojciech Fibak	POL
16	John Sadri	USA
17	Victor Amaya	USA
18	Johan Kriek	RSA
19	Balázs Taróczy	HUN
20	Vijay Amritraj	IND

Year-end rankings 1981 (4 January 1982)
Rk	Name	Nation	Avg. Points	Points	Tourn.#	Change
1	John McEnroe	USA	98.07	1,373	14	▲ +1
2	Ivan Lendl	TCH	78.55	1,571	20	▲ +4
3	Jimmy Connors	USA	78.20	1,173	15	=
4	Björn Borg	SWE	68.33	820	10	▼ –3
5	José Luis Clerc	ARG	67.64	947	14	▲ +3
6	Guillermo Vilas	ARG	54.88	933	17	▼ –1
7	Gene Mayer	USA	45.15	587	13	▼ –3
8	Eliot Teltscher	USA	42.76	727	17	▲ +2
9	Vitas Gerulaitis	USA	40.76	693	17	=
10	Peter McNamara	AUS	37.21	521	14	▲ +10
11	Roscoe Tanner	USA	37.10	742	20	▲ +3
12	Yannick Noah	FRA	34.80	696	20	▲ +11
13	Johan Kriek	RSA	34.44	551	16	▲ +5
14	Sandy Mayer	USA	33.50	536	16	▲ +38
15	Balázs Taróczy	HUN	29.11	524	18	▲ +4
16	Brian Teacher	USA	28.86	404	14	▼ -4
17	Víctor Pecci	PAR	28.81	605	21	▲ +18
18	Wojciech Fibak	POL	27.11	515	19	▼ –3
19	Brian Gottfried	USA	25.36	558	22	▼ –8
20	Mark Edmondson	AUS	23.41	679	29	▲ +82

*The official ATP year-end rankings were listed from January 4th, 1982.

== WCT Tour standings ==
Player	Tournaments Played	Tournaments Won	Points
(United States) Roscoe Tanner	3	1	275
(United States) Jimmy Connors	3	2	270
(Poland) Wojciech Fibak	5	0	260
(France) Yannick Noah	3	1	235
(United States) John McEnroe	2	2	220
(India) Vijay Amritraj	8	0	150
(United States) Brian Gottfried	6	0	140
(United States) Vitas Gerulaitis	3	0	130
(Italy) Corrado Barazzutti	7	1	330
(United States) Sandy Mayer	4	0	13
(United States) Gene Mayer	3	0	125

== List of tournament winners ==
The list of winners and number of singles titles won, alphabetically by last name:

- (Sweden) Björn Borg (3) French Open, Stuttgart Outdoor, Geneva
- (Argentina) José Luis Clerc (6) Florence, Rome, Boston, Washington, D.C., North Conway, Indianapolis
- (United States) Jimmy Connors (4) La Quinta, Brussels, Rotterdam, Wembley
- (South Africa) Kevin Curren (1) Johannesburg
- (United States) Eddie Dibbs (2) Forest Hills WCT, Quito
- (Australia) Mark Edmondson (3) Adelaide, Bristol, Brisbane
- (Poland) Wojciech Fibak (1) Gstaad
- (Chile) Jaime Fillol (1) Mexico City
- (Australia) John Fitzgerald (1) Kitzbühel
- (United States) Vitas Gerulaitis (1) Johannesburg
- (United States) Sammy Giammalva (1) Napa
- (Chile) Hans Gildemeister (1) Santiago
- (Israel) Shlomo Glickstein (1) South Orange
- (Ecuador) Andrés Gómez (1) Bordeaux
- (United States) Brian Gottfried (1) Stowe
- (South Africa) Johan Kriek (3) Monterrey WCT, Newport, Australian Open
- (India) Ramesh Krishnan (1) Manila
- (Czechoslovakia) Ivan Lendl (8) Stuttgart Indoor, Las Vegas, Montreal, Barcelona, Basel, Vienna, Cologne, Buenos Aires
- (New Zealand) Chris Lewis (1) Munich
- (Bolivia) Mario Martínez (1) Venice
- (United States) Gene Mayer (4) Memphis, Denver, Cleveland, Stockholm
- (United States) Sandy Mayer (1) Bologna
- (United States) John McEnroe (10) Boca Raton, Milan, Frankfurt, Los Angeles, Dallas WCT, Queen's Club, Wimbledon, Cincinnati, US Open, Sydney Indoor
- (Australia) Peter McNamara (2) Hamburg, Melbourne Indoor
- (United States) Richard Meyer (1) Sofia
- (France) Yannick Noah (2) Richmond WCT, Nice
- (Italy) Gianni Ocleppo (1) Linz
- (Spain) Manuel Orantes (1) Palermo
- (Socialist Federal Republic of Yugoslavia) Marko Ostoja (1) Brussels
- (Paraguay) Víctor Pecci (2) Viña del Mar, Bournemouth
- (United States) Mel Purcell (3) Tampa, Atlanta, Tel Aviv
- (United States) Bill Scanlon (2) Auckland, Bangkok
- (Czechoslovakia) Pavel Složil (1) Nancy
- (United States) Roscoe Tanner (1) Philadelphia
- (Hungary) Balázs Taróczy (3) Monte Carlo, Hilversum, Tokyo Outdoor
- (United States) Brian Teacher (1) Columbus
- (United States) Eliot Teltscher (2) Puerto Rico, San Francisco
- (France) Thierry Tulasne (1) Båstad
- (United States) Vince Van Patten (1) Tokyo Indoor
- (United States) Robert Van't Hof (1) Taiwan
- (Argentina) Guillermo Vilas (3) Mar del Plata, Cairo, Houston
- (United States) Mark Vines (1) Bercy
- (United States) Tim Wilkison (1) Sydney Outdoor
- (United States) Van Winitsky (1) Hong Kong

The following players won their first title in 1981:

- (South Africa) Kevin Curren (Johannesburg)
- (Australia) John Fitzgerald (Kitzbühel)
- (United States) Sammy Giammalva (Napa)
- (Ecuador) Andrés Gómez (Bordeaux)
- (India) Ramesh Krishnan (Manila)
- (United States) Mel Purcell (Tampa)
- (Czechoslovakia) Pavel Složil (Nancy)
- (France) Thierry Tulasne (Båstad)

== See also ==
- World Championship Tennis
- 1981 WTA Tour
