= 1981 U.S. Pro Indoor – Doubles =

Doubles
- 1981 U.S. Pro Indoor

Final
- Champions: (United States) Marty Riessen (United States) Sherwood Stewart
- Runners-up: (United States) Brian Gottfried (Mexico) Raúl Ramírez
- Score: 6–2, 6–2

Details
- Draw: 28
- Seeds: 8

Events
Singles	Doubles
- U.S. Pro Indoor

Peter Fleming and John McEnroe were the defending champions, but McEnroe did not participate this year. Fleming partnered Sandy Mayer, losing in the semifinals.

Marty Riessen and Sherwood Stewart won the title, defeating Brian Gottfried and Raúl Ramírez 6–2, 6–2 in the final.

== Seeds ==
1. (United States) Peter Fleming / (United States) Sandy Mayer (semifinals)
2. (United States) Brian Gottfried / (Mexico) Raúl Ramírez (final)
3. (South Africa) Frew McMillan / (United States) Stan Smith (quarterfinals)
4. (United States) Bruce Manson / (United States) Brian Teacher (quarterfinals)
5. (Poland) Wojtek Fibak / (Czechoslovakia) Ivan Lendl (quarterfinals, retired)
6. (United States) Victor Amaya / (Switzerland) Heinz Günthardt (second round, withdrew)
7. (United States) Marty Riessen / (United States) Sherwood Stewart (champions)
8. (South Africa) Kevin Curren / (United States) Steve Denton (second round)

== Draw ==
Key

- Q = Qualifier
- WC = Wild card
- LL = Lucky loser
- Alt = Alternate
- ITF = ITF entry
- PR = Protected ranking
- SR = Special ranking
- SE = Special exempt
- JE = Junior exempt
- JR = Junior Accelerator Programme entrant
- CO = College Accelerator Programme entrant
- NG = Next Gen Accelerator Program entrant
- w/o = Walkover
- r = Retired
- d = Defaulted

=== Finals ===
Semifinals
1	(United States) Peter Fleming (United States) Sandy Mayer	5	6
7	(United States) Marty Riessen (United States) Sherwood Stewart	7	7
(United States) Terry Moor (United States) Eliot Teltscher	4	7	5
2	(United States) Brian Gottfried (Mexico) Raúl Ramírez	6	6	7

Final
7	(United States) Marty Riessen (United States) Sherwood Stewart	6	6
2	(United States) Brian Gottfried (Mexico) Raúl Ramírez	2	2

=== Top half ===
First round
1	(United States) P Fleming (United States) S Mayer	6	6
(India) A Amritraj (India) V Amritraj	3	2
(United Kingdom) B Mottram (Czechoslovakia) T Šmíd	4	3
6	(United States) V Amaya (Switzerland) H Günthardt	6	6
3	(South Africa) F McMillan (United States) S Smith	6	6
(Australia) R Case (Australia) P Dent	3	3
(United States) P Du Pré (United States) B Scanlon	2	5
7	(United States) M Riessen (United States) S Stewart	6	7

Second round
1	(United States) P Fleming (United States) S Mayer	4	7	6
(France) Y Noah (France) P Portes	6	6	4
(Austria) P Feigl (Paraguay) F González	w/o
6	(United States) V Amaya (Switzerland) H Günthardt
3	(South Africa) F McMillan (United States) S Smith	6	6
(Australia) R Frawley (New Zealand) R Simpson	3	2
(United States) T Gullikson (South Africa) J Kriek
7	(United States) M Riessen (United States) S Stewart	w/o

Quarterfinals
1	(United States) P Fleming (United States) S Mayer	6	6
(Austria) P Feigl (Paraguay) F González	3	4
3	(South Africa) F McMillan (United States) S Smith	5	3
7	(United States) M Riessen (United States) S Stewart	7	6

Semifinals
1	(United States) P Fleming (United States) S Mayer	5	6
7	(United States) M Riessen (United States) S Stewart	7	7

=== Bottom half ===
First round
8	(South Africa) K Curren (United States) S Denton	6	3	7
(United States) A Pattison (United States) B Walts	4	6	6
(Australia) J James (United States) R Meyer	6	6
4	(United States) B Manson (United States) B Teacher	7	7
5	(Poland) W Fibak (Czechoslovakia) I Lendl	6	7
(United States) T Giammalva (United States) C Mayotte	4	6
(Israel) S Krulevitz (United States) B Nichols	3	6
2	(United States) B Gottfried (Mexico) R Ramírez	6	7

Second round
8	(South Africa) K Curren (United States) S Denton	4	6
(United States) T Moor (United States) E Teltscher	6	7
(United States) M Purcell (United States) V Van Patten	1	0
4	(United States) B Manson (United States) B Teacher	6	6
5	(Poland) W Fibak (Czechoslovakia) I Lendl	6	6
(Israel) S Glickstein (South Africa) D Schneider	4	4
(United States) E Fromm (United States) C Leeds	5	5
2	(United States) B Gottfried (Mexico) R Ramírez	7	7

Quarterfinals
(United States) T Moor (United States) E Teltscher	3	6	6
4	(United States) B Manson (United States) B Teacher	6	1	2
5	(Poland) W Fibak (Czechoslovakia) I Lendl	6	1^{r}
2	(United States) B Gottfried (Mexico) R Ramírez	3	4

Semifinals
(United States) T Moor (United States) E Teltscher	4	7	5
2	(United States) B Gottfried (Mexico) R Ramírez	6	6	7
