= 1981 U.S. Pro Indoor – Singles =

Singles
- 1981 U.S. Pro Indoor

Final
- Champion: (United States) Roscoe Tanner
- Runner-up: (Poland) Wojtek Fibak
- Score: 6–2, 7–6, 7–5

Details
- Draw: 48
- Seeds: 16

Events
Singles	Doubles
- U.S. Pro Indoor

Jimmy Connors was the defending champion, but lost in the quarterfinals this year.

Roscoe Tanner won the title, defeating Wojtek Fibak, 6–2, 7–6, 7–5 in the final.

== Seeds ==
1. (United States) Jimmy Connors (quarterfinals)
2. (United States) Harold Solomon (third round)
3. (United States) Vitas Gerulaitis (quarterfinals)
4. (United States) Eliot Teltscher (first round)
5. (United States) Brian Gottfried (second round)
6. (United States) Brian Teacher (second round)
7. (United States) Roscoe Tanner (champion)
8. (Poland) Wojtek Fibak (final)
9. (United States) Victor Amaya (third round, retired)
10. (South Africa) Johan Kriek (first round)
11. (United States) John Sadri (quarterfinals)
12. (Hungary) Balázs Taróczy (third round)
13. (India) Vijay Amritraj (second round)
14. (France) Yannick Noah (semifinals)
15. (United States) Bill Scanlon (first round)
16. (Czechoslovakia) Tomáš Šmíd (second round)

== Draw ==
Key

- Q = Qualifier
- WC = Wild card
- LL = Lucky loser
- Alt = Alternate
- ITF = ITF entry
- PR = Protected ranking
- SR = Special ranking
- SE = Special exempt
- JE = Junior exempt
- JR = Junior Accelerator Programme entrant
- CO = College Accelerator Programme entrant
- NG = Next Gen Accelerator Program entrant
- w/o = Walkover
- r = Retired
- d = Defaulted

=== Finals ===
Semifinals
8	(Poland) Wojtek Fibak	3	6	6	6
14	(France) Yannick Noah	6	3	3	2
(France) Thierry Tulasne	6	6	6	4	4
7	(United States) Roscoe Tanner	7	3	3	6	6

Final
8	(Poland) Wojtek Fibak	2	6	5
7	(United States) Roscoe Tanner	6	7	7

=== Top half ===
==== Section 1 ====
First round
1	(United States) J Connors	6	6
(United States) S Smith	3	3
9	(United States) V Amaya	3	7	7
(United States) M Riessen	6	6	6
(United States) B Walts	7	6
15	(United States) B Scanlon	6	3
(United States) P Fleming	3	6
8	(Poland) W Fibak	6	7

Second round
1	(United States) J Connors	7	4	6
(Austria) P Feigl	5	6	4
Q	(United States) J Borowiak	4	4
9	(United States) V Amaya	6	6
(United States) B Walts	4	6	3
(United States) T Giammalva	6	3	6
Q	(United States) C Delaney	6	2	0
8	(Poland) W Fibak	1	6	6

Third round
1	(United States) J Connors	6	1
9	(United States) V Amaya	1	0^{r}
(United States) T Giammalva	2	6	2
8	(Poland) W Fibak	6	4	6

Quarterfinals
1	(United States) J Connors	6	6	2
8	(Poland) W Fibak	7	0	6

==== Section 2 ====
First round
(Israel) S Glickstein	6	6
(Australia) R Frawley	3	2
(Mexico) R Ramírez	6	6
(New Zealand) R Simpson	3	3
14	(France) Y Noah	6
(United Kingdom) B Mottram	0	r
(United States) B Manson	3	5
6	(United States) B Teacher	6	7

Second round
3	(United States) V Gerulaitis	6	6
(Israel) S Glickstein	2	2
(Mexico) R Ramírez	6	2
12	(Hungary) B Taróczy	7	6
14	(France) Y Noah	6	3	6
(United States) T Moor	4	6	3
(Paraguay) F González	7	3	6
6	(United States) B Teacher	6	6	2

Third round
3	(United States) V Gerulaitis	6	6
12	(Hungary) B Taróczy	3	4
14	(France) Y Noah	6	7
(Paraguay) F González	4	5

Quarterfinals
3	(United States) V Gerulaitis	4	6	3
14	(France) Y Noah	6	4	6

=== Bottom half ===
==== Section 3 ====
First round
5	(United States) B Gottfried	6	6
(France) C Roger-Vasselin	4	4
(United States) S Mayer	7	3	6
(United States) P DuPré	6	6	4
(United States) M Purcell	6	6
10	(South Africa) J Kriek	2	1
(South Africa) B Mitton	6	6	7
4	(United States) E Teltscher	4	7	5

Second round
5	(United States) B Gottfried	5	3
(United States) T Gullikson	7	6
(United States) S Mayer	6	4	2
11	(United States) J Sadri	4	6	6
(United States) M Purcell	4	1
(France) T Tulasne	6	6
(United States) S Giammalva Jr.	6	4	6
(South Africa) B Mitton	4	6	2

Third round
(United States) T Gullikson	7	6	4
11	(United States) J Sadri	6	7	6
(France) T Tulasne	6	4	6
(United States) S Giammalva Jr.	3	6	2

Quarterfinals
11	(United States) J Sadri	6	3
(France) T Tulasne	7	6

==== Section 4 ====
First round
7	(United States) R Tanner	6	6
(United States) T Waltke	2	3
(United States) D Stockton	7	7
(Australia) P Dent	6	6
(France) P Portes	6	6
(United States) A Pattison	2	3
Q	(Socialist Federal Republic of Yugoslavia) M Ostoja	0	1
2	(United States) H Solomon	6	6

Second round
7	(United States) R Tanner	6	6
(Switzerland) H Günthardt	3	4
(United States) D Stockton	6	6
16	(Czechoslovakia) T Šmíd	4	4
13	(India) V Amritraj	6	1
(France) P Portes	7	6
Q	(United States) J Lapidus	3	3
2	(United States) H Solomon	6	6

Third round
7	(United States) R Tanner	7	7
(United States) D Stockton	6	6
(France) P Portes	3	6	6
2	(United States) H Solomon	6	4	2

Quarterfinals
7	(United States) R Tanner	7	4	6
(France) P Portes	5	6	3
