= 1982 Quito Grand Prix =

Tennis tournament

- Date: 1–7 November
- Edition: 4th
- Category: Grand Prix
- Draw: 32S / 16D
- Prize money: $75,000
- Surface: Clay / outdoor
- Location: Quito, Ecuador

Champions

Singles
- (Ecuador) Andrés Gómez

Doubles
- (Chile) Pedro Rebolledo (Chile) Jaime Fillol
← 1981 ·	Quito Open

The 1982 Quito Grand Prix, also known as the Quito Open, was a men's tennis tournament played on outdoor clay courts in Quito, Ecuador that was part of the Grand Prix tennis circuit. It was the fourth and last edition of the tournament and was held from 1 November until 7 November 1982. Second-seeded Andrés Gómez won the singles title.

== Finals ==
=== Singles ===
(Ecuador) Andrés Gómez defeated (France) Loïc Courteau 6–3, 6–4

- It was Gómez' 2nd and last singles title of the year and the 3rd of his career.

=== Doubles ===
(Chile) Pedro Rebolledo / (Chile) Jaime Fillol defeated (United States) Egan Adams / (United States) Rocky Royer 6–2, 6–3
