= 1981 South African Open (tennis) =

- Date: 21–28 November
- Edition: 78th
- Category: Grand Prix
- Draw: 32S / 16D
- Prize money: $300,000
- Surface: Hard / outdoor
- Location: Johannesburg, South Africa
- Venue: Ellis Park Tennis Stadium

Champions

Men's singles
- (United States) Vitas Gerulaitis

Men's doubles
- (South Africa) John Yuill / (United States) Terry Moor
- South African Open

The 1981 South African Open was a men's tennis tournament played on outdoor hard courts in Johannesburg, South Africa that was part of the 1981 Volvo Grand Prix. It was the 78th edition of the tournament and was held from 21 November through 28 November 1981. First-seeded Vitas Gerulaitis won the singles title.

== Finals ==
=== Singles ===
(United States) Vitas Gerulaitis defeated (United States) Jeff Borowiak 6–4, 7–6, 6–1

=== Doubles ===
(South Africa) John Yuill / (United States) Terry Moor defeated (United States) Fritz Buehning / (New Zealand) Russell Simpson 6–3, 5–7, 6–4, 6–7, 12–10
