= 1981 Madrid Grand Prix =

- Date: 28 September – 4 October
- Edition: 10th
- Category: Grand Prix
- Draw: 32S / 16D
- Prize money: $75,000
- Surface: Clay / outdoor
- Location: Madrid, Spain
- Venue: Real Sociedad Hípica Española Club de Campo

Champions

Singles
- (Czechoslovakia) Ivan Lendl

Doubles
- (Ecuador) Andrés Gómez / (Chile) Hans Gildemeister
- Madrid Tennis Grand Prix

The 1981 Madrid Grand Prix was a men's tennis tournament played on outdoor clay courts that was part of the 1981 Volvo Grand Prix tennis circuit. It was the 10th edition of the tournament and was held at the Real Sociedad Hípica Española Club de Campo in Madrid, Spain from 28 September until 4 October 1981. First-seeded Ivan Lendl won the singles title.

== Finals ==
=== Singles ===
(Czechoslovakia) Ivan Lendl defeated (Peru) Pablo Arraya 6–3, 6–2, 6–2

- It was Lendl's 4th singles title of the year and the 11th of his career.

=== Doubles ===
(Ecuador) Andrés Gómez / (Chile) Hans Gildemeister defeated (Switzerland) Heinz Günthardt / (Czechoslovakia) Tomáš Šmíd 6–2, 3–6, 6–3

- It was Gómez' 5th doubles title of the year and the 10th of his career. It was Gildemeister's 3rd doubles title of the year and the 10th of his career.
