= 1981 Robinson's Tennis Open =

- Date: March 9–15
- Edition: 2nd
- Category: Grand Prix
- Draw: 32S / 16D
- Prize money: $75,000
- Surface: Hard / outdoor
- Location: Oldsmar, Florida, U.S.
- Venue: East Lake Woodlands Golf and Racquet Club
- Attendance: 16,400

Champions

Singles
- (United States) Mel Purcell

Doubles
- (United States) Butch Walts / (South Africa) Bernard Mitton
- Tampa Open

The 1981 Robinson's Tennis Open, also known as the Tampa Open, was a men's tennis tournament played on outdoor hard courts at the East Lake Woodlands Golf and Racquet Club in Oldsmar, Florida in the United States that was part of the 1981 Grand Prix circuit. It was the second edition of the tournament and took place from March 9 through March 15, 1981. Second-seeded Mel Purcell won the singles title and earned $15,000 first-prize money.

== Finals ==
=== Singles ===
(United States) Mel Purcell defeated (United States) Jeff Borowiak 4–6, 6–4, 6–3

- It was Purcell's 1st singles title of his career.

=== Doubles ===
(United States) Butch Walts / (South Africa) Bernard Mitton defeated (Australia) David Carter / (Australia) Paul Kronk 6–3, 3–6, 6–1

- It was Walts' 2nd doubles title of the year and the 10th of his career. It was Mitton's 2nd doubles title of the year and the 5th of his career.
