= 1981 Italian Indoor Open =

- Date: 16–22 November
- Edition: 7th
- Category: Grand Prix
- Draw: 32S / 16D
- Prize money: $75,000
- Surface: Carpet / indoor
- Location: Bologna, Italy

Champions

Singles
- (United States) Sandy Mayer

Doubles
- (United States) Sammy Giammalva Jr. / (France) Henri Leconte
- Bologna Indoor

The 1981 Italian Indoor Open, also known as the Bologna Open or Bologna Indoor, was a men's tennis tournament played on indoor carpet courts that was part of the 1981 Volvo Grand Prix circuit and took place in Bologna, Italy. It was the seventh and last edition of the tournament and was held from 16 November through 22 November 1981. Third-seeded Sandy Mayer won the singles title.

== Finals ==
=== Singles ===
(United States) Sandy Mayer defeated (Romania) Ilie Năstase 7–5, 6–3

- It was Mayer's only singles title of the year and the 9th of his career.

=== Doubles ===
(United States) Sammy Giammalva Jr. / (France) Henri Leconte defeated (Czechoslovakia) Tomáš Šmíd / (Hungary) Balázs Taróczy 7–6, 6–4
