= 1981 Alan King Tennis Classic =

- Date: April 20–26
- Edition: 10th
- Category: Grand Prix circuit Super Series
- Draw: 32S / 16D
- Prize money: $300,000
- Surface: Hard / outdoor
- Location: Las Vegas, United States
- Venue: Caesars Palace

Champions

Singles
- (Czechoslovakia) Ivan Lendl

Doubles
- (United States) John McEnroe / (United States) Peter Fleming
- Alan King Tennis Classic

The 1981 Alan King Tennis Classic, also known as the Alan King-Caesars Palace Tennis Classic, was a men's tennis tournament played on outdoor hard courts at the Caesars Palace in Las Vegas, United States. It was the tenth edition of the event and was part of the Super Series of the 1981 Volvo Grand Prix circuit. The tournament was held from April 20 through April 26, 1981. First-seeded Ivan Lendl won the singles title and the accompanying $60,000 first-prize money.

== Finals ==
=== Singles ===
(Czechoslovakia) Ivan Lendl defeated (United States) Harold Solomon 6–4, 6–2

- It was Lendl's 2nd singles title of the year and the 9th of his career.

=== Doubles ===
(United States) John McEnroe / (United States) Peter Fleming defeated (United States) Tracy Delatte / (United States) Trey Waltke 6–3, 7–6
