= 1981 Alitalia Open =

- Date: 11–17 May
- Edition: 9th
- Category: Grand Prix
- Draw: 32S / 16D
- Prize money: $50,000
- Surface: Clay / outdoor
- Location: Florence, Italy

Champions

Singles
- (Argentina) José Luis Clerc

Doubles
- (Czechoslovakia) Pavel Složil / (Italy) Adriano Panatta
- ATP Florence

The 1981 Alitalia Open was a men's tennis tournament played on outdoor clay courts in Florence, Italy that was part of the 1981 Volvo Grand Prix circuit. It was the ninth edition of the tournament and was played from 11 May until 17 May 1981. First-seeded José Luis Clerc won the singles title.

== Finals ==
=== Singles ===
(Argentina) José Luis Clerc defeated (Mexico) Raúl Ramírez 6–1, 6–2

- It was Clerc's 1st singles title of the year and the 11th of his career.

=== Doubles ===
(Czechoslovakia) Pavel Složil / (Mexico) Raúl Ramírez defeated (Italy) Paolo Bertolucci / (Italy) Adriano Panatta 6–3, 3–6, 6–3
