= 1981 ATP Championship =

- Date: August 17–23
- Edition: 80th
- Category: Grand Prix circuit
- Draw: 64S / 32D
- Prize money: $200,000
- Surface: Hard / outdoor
- Location: Mason, Ohio, U.S.
- Venue: Lindner Family Tennis Center

Champions

Singles
- (United States) John McEnroe

Doubles
- (United States) John McEnroe / (United States) Ferdi Taygan
- Cincinnati Masters

The 1981 ATP Championship, also known as the Cincinnati Open, was a men's tennis tournament played on outdoor hard courts at the Lindner Family Tennis Center in Mason, Ohio in the United States that was part of the 1981 Volvo Grand Prix. It was the 80th edition of the tournament and was held from August 17 through August 23, 1981. First-seeded John McEnroe won the singles title.

== Finals ==
=== Singles ===
(United States) John McEnroe defeated (New Zealand) Chris Lewis 6–3, 6–4

- It was McEnroe's 8th singles title of the year and the 32nd of his career.

=== Doubles ===
(United States) John McEnroe / (United States) Ferdi Taygan defeated (United States) Bob Lutz / (United States) Stan Smith 7–6, 6–3
