= 1981 U.S. National Indoor Championships =

- Date: February 23 – March 1
- Edition: 11th
- Category: Grand Prix
- Draw: 48S / 24D
- Prize money: $200,000
- Surface: Carpet / indoor
- Location: Memphis, Tennessee, U.S.
- Venue: Racquet Club of Memphis

Champions

Singles
- (United States) Gene Mayer

Doubles
- (United States) Gene Mayer / (United States) Sandy Mayer
- U.S. National Indoor Championships

The 1981 U.S. National Indoor Championships was a men's tennis tournament played on indoor carpet courts that was part of the 1981 Volvo Grand Prix. It was the 11th edition of the tournament and was played at the Racquet Club of Memphis in Memphis, Tennessee in the United States from February 23 through March 1, 1981. Second-seeded Gene Mayer won the singles title and earned $36,000 first-prize money.

== Finals ==
=== Singles ===
(United States) Gene Mayer defeated (United States) Roscoe Tanner 6–2, 6–4

- It was Mayer's 1st singles title of the year and the 8th of his career.

=== Doubles ===
(United States) Gene Mayer / (United States) Sandy Mayer defeated (United States) Mike Cahill / (United States) Tom Gullikson 7–6^{(7–3)}, 6–7^{(5–7)}, 7–6^{(7–5)}
