= 1981 Monterrey WCT =

- Date: January 19–25
- Edition: 3rd
- Category: Grand Prix (WCT)
- Draw: 32S / 16D
- Prize money: $175,000
- Surface: Carpet / indoor
- Location: Monterrey, Mexico

Champions

Singles
- (South Africa) Johan Kriek

Doubles
- (South Africa) Kevin Curren / (United States) Steve Denton
- Monterrey WCT

The 1981 Monterrey WCT was a men's tennis tournament played on indoor carpet courts in Monterrey, Mexico and officially known as Monterrey Tennis Cup. The event was part of the WCT Tour which was incorporated into the 1981 Volvo Grand Prix circuit. It was the third edition of the tournament and was held from January 19 through January 25, 1981. Fourth-seeded Johan Kriek won the singles title.

== Finals ==
=== Singles ===
(South Africa) Johan Kriek defeated (United States) Vitas Gerulaitis 7–6, 3–6, 7–6

- It was Kriek's 1st singles title of the year and the 2nd of his career.

=== Doubles ===
(South Africa) Kevin Curren / (United States) Steve Denton defeated (South Africa) Johan Kriek / (New Zealand) Russell Simpson 7–6, 6–3
