= 1981 U.S. Pro Indoor =

- Date: January 26 – February 1
- Edition: 14th
- Category: Grand Prix circuit (WCT)
- Draw: 48S / 24D
- Prize money: $250,000
- Surface: Carpet / indoor
- Location: Philadelphia, Pennsylvania, U.S.
- Venue: Spectrum

Champions

Singles
- (United States) Roscoe Tanner

Doubles
- (United States) Marty Riessen / (United States) Sherwood Stewart
- U.S. Pro Indoor

The 1981 U.S. Pro Indoor was a men's tennis tournament played on indoor carpet courts. It was a WCT tournament that was part of the 1981 Volvo Grand Prix circuit. The tournament was played at the Spectrum in Philadelphia, Pennsylvania in the United States and was held from January 26 through February 1, 1981. Seventh-seeded Roscoe Tanner won the singles title.

== Finals ==
=== Singles ===
(United States) Roscoe Tanner defeated (Poland) Wojciech Fibak 6–2, 7–6, 7–5

- It was Tanner's only title of the year and the 29th of his career.

=== Doubles ===
(United States) Marty Riessen / (United States) Sherwood Stewart defeated (United States) Brian Gottfried / (Mexico) Raúl Ramírez 6–2, 6–2

- It was Riessen's only title of the year and the 59th of his career. It was Stewart's 1st title of the year and the 30th of his career.
