= 1980 Mercedes Cup =

- Date: 14–20 July
- Edition: 3rd
- Category: Grand Prix
- Draw: 32S / 16D
- Prize money: $75,000
- Surface: Clay / outdoor
- Location: Stuttgart, West Germany
- Venue: Tennis Club Weissenhof

Champions

Singles
- (United States) Vitas Gerulaitis

Doubles
- (South Africa) Frew McMillan / (Switzerland) Colin Dowdeswell
- Stuttgart Open

The 1980 Mercedes Cup was a men's tennis tournament played on outdoor clay courts and held at the Tennis Club Weissenhof in Stuttgart, West Germany that was part of the 1980 Grand Prix circuit. It was the third edition of the tournament and was held from 14 July until 20 July 1980. First-seeded Vitas Gerulaitis won the singles title.

== Finals ==
=== Singles ===
(United States) Vitas Gerulaitis defeated (Poland) Wojciech Fibak, 6–2, 7–5, 6–2

- It was Gerulaitis' second singles title of the year and the 17th of his career.

=== Doubles ===
(South Africa) Frew McMillan / (Switzerland) Colin Dowdeswell defeated (New Zealand) Chris Lewis / (South Africa) John Yuill, 6–3, 6–4
