= 1981 United Bank Classic =

- Date: March 2–8
- Edition: 10th
- Category: Grand Prix
- Draw: 32S / 16D
- Prize money: $125,000
- Surface: Carpet / indoor
- Location: Denver, Colorado, U.S.

Champions

Singles
- (United States) Gene Mayer

Doubles
- (United States) Butch Walts / (Zimbabwe) Andrew Pattison
← 1980 ·	Denver Open	· 1982 →

The 1981 United Bank Classic, also known as the Denver WCT, was a men's tennis tournament played on indoor carpet courts in Denver, Colorado in the United States that was part of the 1981 Grand Prix circuit. It was the tenth edition of the tournament and took place from March 2 through March 8, 1981. First-seeded Gene Mayer won his second consecutive singles title at the event.

== Finals ==
=== Singles ===
(United States) Gene Mayer defeated (United States) John Sadri 6–4, 6–4

- It was Mayer's 2nd singles title of the year and the 9th of his career.

=== Doubles ===
(United States) Butch Walts / (Zimbabwe) Andrew Pattison defeated (United States) Mel Purcell / (United States) Dick Stockton 6–3, 6–4
