= 1981 Washington Star International =

- Date: July 20–26
- Edition: 13th
- Category: Grand Prix
- Draw: 64S / 32D
- Prize money: $175,000
- Surface: Clay / outdoor
- Location: Washington, D.C., United States
- Venue: Rock Creek Park

Champions

Singles
- (Argentina) José Luis Clerc

Doubles
- (Mexico) Raúl Ramírez / (United States) Van Winitsky
- Washington Open

The 1981 Washington Star International was a men's tennis tournament and was played on outdoor clay courts. The event was part of the 1981 Grand Prix circuit. It was the 13th edition of the tournament and was held at Rock Creek Park in Washington, D.C. from July 20 through July 26, 1981. Third-seeded José Luis Clerc won the singles title.

== Finals ==
=== Singles ===
(Argentina) José Luis Clerc defeated (Argentina) Guillermo Vilas 7–5, 6–2

- It was Clerc's 4th singles title of the year and the 14th of his career.

=== Doubles ===
(Mexico) Raúl Ramírez / (United States) Van Winitsky defeated (Czechoslovakia) Pavel Složil / (United States) Ferdi Taygan 5–7, 7–6^{(9–7)}, 7–6^{(8–6)}
