= 1981 ABN World Tennis Tournament =

- Date: 16–22 March
- Edition: 9th
- Category: Grand Prix circuit (WCT)
- Draw: 32S / 16D
- Prize money: $175,000
- Surface: Carpet / indoor
- Location: Rotterdam, Netherlands
- Venue: Rotterdam Ahoy

Champions

Singles
- (United States) Jimmy Connors

Doubles
- (United States) Fritz Buehning / (United States) Ferdi Taygan
- ABN World Tennis Tournament

The 1981 ABN World Tennis Tournament was a men's tennis tournament played on indoor carpet courts at Rotterdam Ahoy in the Netherlands. It was a WCT tournament that was part of the 1981 Volvo Grand Prix circuit. It was the ninth edition of the tournament and was held from 16 March through 22 March 1981. First-seeded Jimmy Connors won the singles title, his second after 1978.

== Finals ==
=== Singles ===
(United States) Jimmy Connors defeated (United States) Gene Mayer 6–1, 2–6, 6–2

=== Doubles ===
(United States) Fritz Buehning / (United States) Ferdi Taygan defeated (United States) Gene Mayer / (United States) Sandy Mayer 7–6, 1–6, 6–4
