= John Yuill (tennis) =

South African tennis player

- Country (sports): South Africa
- Residence: Durban, South Africa
- Born: 12 December 1948 (age 77) Durban, South Africa
- Turned pro: 1966 (amateur tour)
- Retired: 1983
- Plays: Right-handed

Singles
- Career record: 91–137
- Career titles: 0
- Highest ranking: No. 52 (20 December 1974)

Grand Slam singles results
- French Open: 4R (1977)
- Wimbledon: 3R (1973)
- US Open: 3R (1974, 1976, 1977)

Doubles
- Career record: 76–126
- Career titles: 2
- Highest ranking: No. 480 (3 January 1983)

Grand Slam doubles results
- French Open: 2R (1977, 1980)
- Wimbledon: 2R (1974, 1981)
- US Open: 2R (1974, 1977)

Grand Slam mixed doubles results
- French Open: 2R (1977, 1981)
- Wimbledon: QF (1975)

John McLaren Yuill (born 12 December 1948) is a former professional tennis player from South Africa. Yuill turned professional in 1966.

He achieved a career-high singles ranking of world No. 52 on December 20, 1974. His notable achievements include reaching the round of 16 (fourth round) in singles at the 1977 French Open.

During his career, he won two doubles titles. He also won professional doubles titles at the 1974 Irish Open Championships and the 1981 Johannesburg Open.

== Career finals ==
=== Doubles (2 titles, 2 runner-ups) ===
Result	W/L	Date	Tournament	Surface	Partner	Opponents	Score
Win	1–0	Jul 1974	Dublin, Ireland	Outdoor	(Rhodesia) Colin Dowdeswell	(Argentina) Lito Álvarez (Venezuela) Jorge Andrew	6–3, 6–2
Loss	1–1	Jan 1975	Birmingham, U.S.	Carpet	(Rhodesia) Colin Dowdeswell	(West Germany) Jürgen Fassbender (West Germany) Karl Meiler	1–6, 6–3, 6–7
Loss	1–2	Jul 1980	Stuttgart Outdoor, Germany	Clay	(New Zealand) Chris Lewis	(Switzerland) Colin Dowdeswell (South Africa) Frew McMillan	3–6, 4–6
Win	2–2	Nov 1981	Johannesburg, South Africa	Hard	(United States) Terry Moor	(United States) Fritz Buehning (New Zealand) Russell Simpson	6–3, 5–7, 6–4, 6–7, 12–10
