= 1981 ABN World Tennis Tournament – Singles =

Singles
- 1981 ABN World Tennis Tournament

Final
- Champion: (United States) Jimmy Connors
- Runner-up: (United States) Gene Mayer
- Score: 6–1, 2–6, 6–2

Details
- Draw: 32
- Seeds: 8

Events
| Singles | Doubles |
- ABN World Tennis Tournament

Heinz Günthardt was the defending champion of the singles event at the ABN World Tennis Tournament, but did not participate in this edition. First-seeded Jimmy Connors won the title after a victory in the final against second-seeded Gene Mayer 6–1, 2–6, 6–2.

== Seeds ==
1. (United States) Jimmy Connors (champion)
2. (United States) Gene Mayer (final)
3. (Poland) Wojtek Fibak (semifinals)
4. (France) Yannick Noah (quarterfinals)
5. (United States) Brian Gottfried (semifinals)
6. (Hungary) Balázs Taróczy (first round)
7. (India) Vijay Amritraj (second round)
8. (United States) Bob Lutz (first round)

== Draw ==
=== Finals ===
Semifinals
1 | (United States) Jimmy Connors | 6 | 6
5 | (United States) Brian Gottfried | 2 | 3
3 | (Poland) Wojtek Fibak | 2 | 3
2 | (United States) Gene Mayer | 6 | 6

Final
1 | (United States) Jimmy Connors | 6 | 2 | 6
2 | (United States) Gene Mayer | 1 | 6 | 2

=== Upper half ===
First round
1 | (United States) Jimmy Connors | 6 | 6
(United States) Tim Wilkison | 2 | 1
(Netherlands) Eric Wilborts | 2 | 6 | 6
(United States) Pat Dupre | 6 | 4 | 4
(United States) Bill Scanlon | 6 | 6
(Ecuador) Andrés Gómez | 3 | 0
(United States) Sandy Mayer | 6 | 6
8 | (United States) Robert Lutz | 3 | 1
4 | (France) Yannick Noah | 5 | 6 | 6
(United States) Peter Rennert | 7 | 4 | 1
(West Germany) Rolf Gehring | 6 | 4 | 6
(Netherlands) Marc Albert | 1 | 6 | 4
(Czechoslovakia) Tomáš Šmíd | 6 | 6 | 6
(Sweden) Kjell Johansson | 7 | 4 | 1
(New Zealand) Chris Lewis | 4 | 4
5 | (United States) Brian Gottfried | 6 | 6

Second round
1 | (United States) Jimmy Connors | 6 | 6
(Netherlands) Eric Wilborts | 1 | 1
(United States) Bill Scanlon | 7 | 3 | 2
(United States) Sandy Mayer | 6 | 6 | 6
4 | (France) Yannick Noah | 6 | 6
(West Germany) Rolf Gehring | 4 | 2
(Czechoslovakia) Tomáš Šmíd | 4 | 4
5 | (United States) Brian Gottfried | 6 | 6

Quarterfinals
1 | (United States) Jimmy Connors | 6 | 6
(United States) Sandy Mayer | 4 | 3
4 | (France) Yannick Noah | 7 | 3 | 6
5 | (United States) Brian Gottfried | 6 | 6 | 7

Semifinals
1 | (United States) Jimmy Connors | 6 | 6
5 | (United States) Brian Gottfried | 2 | 3

=== Lower half ===
First round
7 | (India) Vijay Amritraj | 6 | 6
(Sweden) Jan Norbäck | 2 | 2
(Mexico) Raúl Ramírez | 6 | 6
(Spain) Manuel Orantes | 1 | 1
(United States) Trey Waltke | 6 | 4 | 7
(South Africa) Eddie Edwards | 2 | 6 | 6
(Brazil) Carlos Kirmayr | 1 | 6 | 0
3 | (Poland) Wojtek Fibak | 6 | 4 | 6
6 | (Hungary) Balázs Taróczy | 2 | 3
(United Kingdom) Buster Mottram | 6 | 6
(Netherlands) Louk Sanders | 6 | 6 | 3
(United States) Fritz Buehning | 7 | 4 | 6
(Australia) Kim Warwick | 1 | 6 | 0
(United States) Tim Gullikson | 6 | 3 | 6
(United States) Kevin Curren | 2 | 2
2 | (United States) Gene Mayer | 6 | 6

Second round
7 | (India) Vijay Amritraj | 6 | 7 | 6
(Mexico) Raúl Ramírez | 7 | 5 | 7
(United States) Trey Waltke | 3 | 6
3 | (Poland) Wojtek Fibak | 6 | 7
(United Kingdom) Buster Mottram | 7 | 6
(United States) Fritz Buehning | 5 | 1
(United States) Tim Gullikson | 6 | 6
2 | (United States) Gene Mayer | 7 | 7

Quarterfinals
(Mexico) Raúl Ramírez | 1 | 4
3 | (Poland) Wojtek Fibak | 6 | 6
(United Kingdom) Buster Mottram | 1 | 6
2 | (United States) Gene Mayer | 6 | 7

Semifinals
3 | (Poland) Wojtek Fibak | 2 | 3
2 | (United States) Gene Mayer | 6 | 6
