= 1981 Quito Grand Prix =

Tennis tournament

- Date: 2–8 November
- Edition: 3rd
- Category: Grand Prix
- Draw: 32S / 16D
- Prize money: $75,000
- Surface: Clay / outdoor
- Location: Quito, Ecuador

Champions

Singles
- (United States) Eddie Dibbs

Doubles
- (Ecuador) Andrés Gómez (Chile) Hans Gildemeister
- Quito Open

The 1981 Quito Grand Prix, also known as the Quito Open, was a men's tennis tournament played on outdoor clay courts in Quito, Ecuador that was part of the Grand Prix tennis circuit. It was the third edition of the tournament and was held from 2 November until 8 November 1981. Third-seeded Eddie Dibbs won the singles title.

== Finals ==
=== Singles ===
(United States) Eddie Dibbs defeated (Australia) David Carter 3–6, 6–0, 7–5

- It was Dibbs' 2nd singles title of the year and the 22nd and last of his career.

=== Doubles ===
(Ecuador) Andrés Gómez / (Chile) Hans Gildemeister defeated (Australia) David Carter / (Ecuador) Ricardo Ycaza 7–5, 6–3
