= Russell Simpson (tennis) =

New Zealand tennis player

- Country (sports): New Zealand
- Residence: Beverly Hills, California, United States
- Born: 22 February 1954 (age 72) Auckland, New Zealand
- Height: 6 ft 2 in (188 cm)
- Plays: Right-handed
- Prize money: $326,467

Singles
- Career record: 140–203
- Career titles: 0
- Highest ranking: No. 47 (18 April 1983)

Grand Slam singles results
- Australian Open: 2R (1978, 1979, 1981, 1982, 1987)
- French Open: 2R (1976)
- Wimbledon: 4R (1982)
- US Open: 3R (1980)

Doubles
- Career record: 134–173
- Career titles: 5
- Highest ranking: No. 94 (11 November 1985)

Grand Slam doubles results
- Australian Open: SF (1980)
- French Open: 3R (1977)
- Wimbledon: 3R (1981, 1982)
- US Open: 2R (1977)

Russell Simpson (born 22 February 1954) is a former tennis player from New Zealand, who won five doubles titles during his professional career. He reached his highest singles ATP ranking on 18 April 1983, when he became No. 47 in the world. He is currently the head tennis professional at the Beverly Hills Tennis Club in Beverly Hills, California.

Simpson is the younger brother of Jeff Simpson, who was also a professional tennis player.

== Career finals ==
=== Singles: 2 (2 runner-ups) ===
Result	W-L	Date	Tournament	Surface	Opponent	Score
Loss	0–1	Jan 1982	Auckland, New Zealand	Hard	(United States) Tim Wilkison	4–6, 4–6, 4–6
Loss	0–2	Jan 1983	Auckland, New Zealand	Hard	(Australia) John Alexander	4–6, 3–6, 3–6

=== Doubles: 9 (5 titles / 4 runner-ups) ===
Result	W-L	Date	Tournament	Surface	Partner	Opponents	Score
Loss	0–1	Apr 1975	Houston, U.S.	Clay	(United States) Mike Estep	(United States) Bob Lutz (United States) Stan Smith	5–7, 6–7
Win	1–1	Jan 1977	Auckland, New Zealand	Grass	(New Zealand) Chris Lewis	(Australia) Peter Langsford (United Kingdom) Jonathan Smith	7–6, 6–4
Win	2–1	Apr 1977	Florence, Italy	Clay	(New Zealand) Chris Lewis	(Colombia) Iván Molina (Colombia) Jairo Velasco	2–6, 7–6, 6–2
Win	3–1	Apr 1978	Tulsa, U.S.	Hard	(United States) Van Winitsky	(Brazil) Carlos Kirmayr (Ecuador) Ricardo Ycaza	4–6, 7–6, 6–2
Loss	3–2	Jan 1981	Monterrey, Mexico	Carpet	(South Africa) Johan Kriek	(South Africa) Kevin Curren (United States) Steve Denton	6–7, 3–6
Win	4–2	Jun 1981	Bristol, U.K.	Grass	(United States) Billy Martin	(United States) John Austin (South Africa) Johan Kriek	6–3, 4–6, 6–4
Loss	4–3	Nov 1981	Johannesburg, South Africa	Hard	(United States) Fritz Buehning	(United States) Terry Moor (South Africa) John Yuill	3–6, 7–5, 4–6, 7–6, 10–12
Win	5–3	Jan 1983	Auckland, New Zealand	Hard	(New Zealand) Chris Lewis	(Australia) David Graham (Australia) Laurie Warder	7–6, 6–3
Loss	5–4	Jun 1985	Bristol, U.K.	Grass	(Australia) John Alexander	(South Africa) Eddie Edwards (South Africa) Danie Visser	4–6, 6–7
