= Terry Moor =

American tennis player (born 1952)

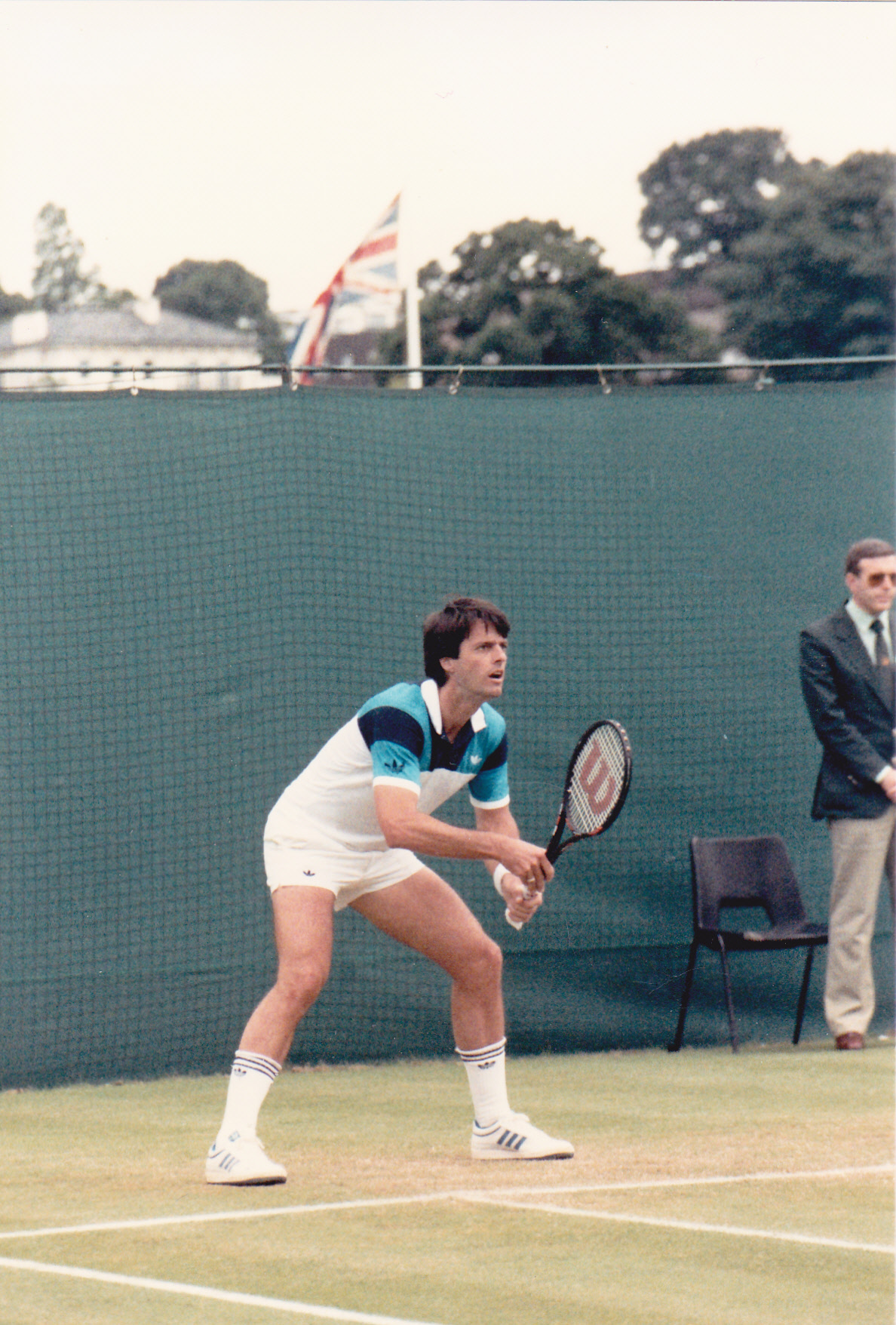
- Country (sports): United States
- Residence: Memphis, Tennessee, United States
- Born: April 23, 1952 (age 74) Hartford, Connecticut, United States
- Height: 5 ft 10 in (1.78 m)
- Turned pro: 1973
- Retired: 1987
- Plays: Left-handed (one-handed backhand)
- Prize money: $776,732

Singles
- Career record: 235–226
- Career titles: 2
- Highest ranking: No. 32 (October 29, 1984)

Grand Slam singles results
- French Open: 4R (1981)
- Wimbledon: 4R (1984)
- US Open: 3R (1977, 1978, 1980, 1983)

Doubles
- Career record: 180–192
- Career titles: 3

Grand Slam doubles results
- French Open: F (1981)
- US Open: 3R (1977, 1981, 1986)

Terry Moor (born April 23, 1952) is a former tennis player from the United States, who won two singles and three doubles titles during his professional career.

He reached his highest singles ATP-ranking on October 29, 1984, when he became world No. 32.

He is currently a database programmer in Memphis, Tennessee.

== Grand Slam finals ==
=== Doubles ===
| Result | Year | Championship | Surface | Partner | Opponents | Score |
|---|---|---|---|---|---|---|
| Loss | 1981 | French Open | Clay | (United States) Eliot Teltscher | (Switzerland) Heinz Günthardt (Hungary) Balázs Taróczy | 6–2, 7–6, 6–3 |

== Career finals ==
=== Singles (2 titles, 4 runner-ups) ===
| Result | W/L | Date | Tournament | Surface | Opponent | Score |
|---|---|---|---|---|---|---|
| Loss | 0–1 | Dec 1977 | Bombay, India | Clay | (India) Vijay Amritraj | 4–6, 1–6 |
| Loss | 0–2 | Jul 1979 | Louisville, U.S. | Clay | (Australia) John Alexander | 6–7, 7–6, 3–3 ret. |
| Win | 1–2 | Oct 1979 | Tokyo, Japan | Clay | (United States) Pat Du Pré | 3–6, 7–6, 6–2 |
| Loss | 1–3 | Aug 1980 | Atlanta, U.S. | Clay | (United States) Eliot Teltscher | 2–6, 2–6 |
| Win | 2–3 | Aug 1984 | Cleveland, U.S | Hard | (United States) Marty Davis | 3–6, 7–6, 6–2 |
| Loss | 2–4 | Oct 1984 | Tokyo, Japan | Hard | (United States) David Pate | 3–6, 5–7 |

=== Doubles (3 titles, 7 runner-ups) ===
| Result | W/L | Date | Tournament | Surface | Partner | Opponents | Score |
|---|---|---|---|---|---|---|---|
| Loss | 0–1 | Nov 1977 | Manila, Philippines | Hard | (United States) Mike Cahill | (Australia) Chris Kachel (Australia) John Marks | 6–4, 0–6, 6–7 |
| Win | 1–1 | Dec 1977 | Bombay, India | Clay | (United States) Mike Cahill | (Mexico) Marcello Lara (India) Jasjit Singh | 6–7, 6–4, 6–4 |
| Loss | 1–2 | Nov 1979 | Tokyo Indoor, Japan | Carpet | (United States) Mike Cahill | (United States) Marty Riessen (United States) Sherwood Stewart | 4–6, 6–7 |
| Win | 2–2 | Mar 1980 | New Orleans, U.S. | Carpet (i) | (United States) Eliot Teltscher | (South Africa) Ray Moore (South Africa) Robert Trogolo | 7–1, 6–1 |
| Loss | 2–3 | Oct 1980 | Tokyo Outdoor, Japan | Clay | (United States) Eliot Teltscher | (Australia) Ross Case (Chile) Jaime Fillol | 3–6, 6–3, 4–6 |
| Loss | 2–4 | Feb 1981 | La Quinta, U.S. | Hard | (United States) Eliot Teltscher | (United States) Bruce Manson (United States) Brian Teacher | 6–7, 2–6 |
| Loss | 2–5 | Jun 1981 | French Open, Paris | Clay | (United States) Eliot Teltscher | (Switzerland) Heinz Günthardt (Hungary) Balázs Taróczy | 2–6, 6–7, 3–6 |
| Win | 3–5 | Nov 1981 | Johannesburg, South Africa | Hard | (South Africa) John Yuill | (United States) Fritz Buehning (New Zealand) Russell Simpson | 6–3, 5–7, 6–4, 6–7, 12–10 |
| Loss | 3–6 | Oct 1982 | Vienna, Austria | Carpet (i) | (United States) Mark Dickson | (France) Henri Leconte (Czechoslovakia) Pavel Složil | 1–6, 6–7 |
| Loss | 3–7 | Aug 1984 | Columbus, U.S. | Hard | (United States) Bud Cox | (United States) Sandy Mayer (United States) Stan Smith | 4–6, 7–6, 5–7 |
