= 1980 Fischer-Grand Prix – Doubles =

Doubles
- 1980 Fischer-Grand Prix

Final
- Champions: (United States) Bob Lutz (United States) Stan Smith
- Runners-up: (Switzerland) Heinz Günthardt (Czechoslovakia) Pavel Složil
- Score: 6–1, 6–2

Details
- Draw: 24
- Seeds: 8

Events
Singles	Doubles
← 1979 ·	Vienna Open	· 1981 →

Bob Hewitt and Frew McMillan were the defending champions but lost in the semifinals to Bob Lutz and Stan Smith.

Lutz and Smith won in the final 6–1, 6–2 against Heinz Günthardt and Pavel Složil.

== Seeds ==
The draw allocated unseeded teams at random; as a result three seeded teams received byes into the second round.

1. (United States) Bob Lutz / (United States) Stan Smith (champions)
2. (United States) Brian Gottfried / (Mexico) Raúl Ramírez (second round)
3. (South Africa) Bob Hewitt / (South Africa) Frew McMillan (semifinals)
4. (South Africa) Kevin Curren / (United States) Steve Denton (second round)
5. (Switzerland) Heinz Günthardt / (Czechoslovakia) Pavel Složil (final)
6. (Czechoslovakia) Jan Kodeš / (Czechoslovakia) Tomáš Šmíd (second round)
7. (Australia) Colin Dibley / (Australia) Paul Kronk (quarterfinals)
8. (Socialist Federal Republic of Yugoslavia) Željko Franulović / (Hungary) Balázs Taróczy (quarterfinals)

== Draw ==
=== Key ===
- Q = Qualifier
- WC = Wild card
- LL = Lucky loser
- Alt = Alternate
- SE = Special exempt
- PR = Protected ranking
- ITF = ITF entry
- JE = Junior exempt
- w/o = Walkover
- r = Retired
- d = Defaulted
- SR = Special ranking

=== Finals ===
Semifinals
1	(United States) Bob Lutz (United States) Stan Smith	6	7	7
3	(South Africa) Bob Hewitt (South Africa) Frew McMillan	7	6	5
5	(Switzerland) Heinz Günthardt (Czechoslovakia) Pavel Složil	7	5	6
(United States) Billy Martin (New Zealand) Russell Simpson	6	7	3

Final
1	(United States) Bob Lutz (United States) Stan Smith	6	6
5	(Switzerland) Heinz Günthardt (Czechoslovakia) Pavel Složil	1	2

=== Top half ===
First round
1	(United States) B Lutz (United States) S Smith	6	7
(United States) E Fromm (United States) J Hayes	3	6
(West Germany) P Elter (United States) T Waltke	5	6
7	(Australia) C Dibley (Australia) P Kronk	7	7
(Austria) P Feigl (Italy) G Ocleppo	6	3	6
(Italy) C Barazzutti (Austria) H Kary	2	6	3
(Czechoslovakia) S Birner (United States) N Saviano	6	6
(United States) S Meister (Socialist Federal Republic of Yugoslavia) M Ostoja	1	2

Second round
1	(United States) B Lutz (United States) S Smith	6	6
(France) Y Noah (France) P Portes	1	2
(Austria) H-P Kandler (Czechoslovakia) J Průcha	2	3
7	(Australia) C Dibley (Australia) P Kronk	6	6
3	(South Africa) B Hewitt (South Africa) F McMillan	w/o
(Austria) P Feigl (Italy) G Ocleppo
(Czechoslovakia) S Birner (United States) N Saviano	7	7
6	(Czechoslovakia) J Kodeš (Czechoslovakia) T Šmíd	5	5

Quarterfinals
1	(United States) B Lutz (United States) S Smith	6	6
7	(Australia) C Dibley (Australia) P Kronk	1	4
3	(South Africa) B Hewitt (South Africa) F McMillan	3	6	6
(Czechoslovakia) S Birner (United States) N Saviano	6	4	3

Semifinals
1	(United States) B Lutz (United States) S Smith	6	7	7
3	(South Africa) B Hewitt (South Africa) F McMillan	7	6	5

=== Bottom half ===
First round
5	(Switzerland) H Günthardt (Czechoslovakia) P Složil	6	6
(Australia) D Carter (Israel) S Glickstein	2	3
(South Africa) B Mitton (South Africa) R Moore	6	6
(United States) T Giammalva (New Zealand) C Lewis	4	3
8	(Socialist Federal Republic of Yugoslavia) Ž Franulović (Hungary) B Taróczy	6	6
(Switzerland) I Dupasquier (United States) S Giammalva Jr.	3	2
(United States) T Cain (South Africa) E Edwards	w/o
2	(United States) B Gottfried (Mexico) R Ramírez

Second round
5	(Switzerland) H Günthardt (Czechoslovakia) P Složil	6	7
(France) C Freyss (Spain) Á Giménez	1	6
(South Africa) B Mitton (South Africa) R Moore	7	6
4	(South Africa) K Curren (United States) S Denton	5	4
8	(Socialist Federal Republic of Yugoslavia) Ž Franulović (Hungary) B Taróczy	6	6
(United States) M Doyle (United States) C Leeds	4	2
(United States) B Martin (New Zealand) R Simpson	6	4	6
(United States) T Cain (South Africa) E Edwards	3	6	3

Quarterfinals
5	(Switzerland) H Günthardt (Czechoslovakia) P Složil	6	6
(South Africa) B Mitton (South Africa) R Moore	4	4
8	(Socialist Federal Republic of Yugoslavia) Ž Franulović (Hungary) B Taróczy	6	6	3
(United States) B Martin (New Zealand) R Simpson	4	7	6

Semifinals
5	(Switzerland) H Günthardt (Czechoslovakia) P Složil	7	5	6
(United States) B Martin (New Zealand) R Simpson	6	7	3
