= 1981 Cuore Cup – Singles =

Singles
- 1981 Cuore Cup

Final
- Champion: (United States) John McEnroe
- Runner-up: (Sweden) Björn Borg
- Score: 7–6^{(7–2)}, 6–4

Details
- Draw: 32
- Seeds: 8

Events
Singles	Doubles
- Milan Indoor

The 1981 Cuore Cup – Singles was an event of the 1981 Cuore Cup tennis tournament and was played on indoor carpet courts at the Palazzo dello Sport in Milan, Italy, between 23 March and 29 March 1981. The draw comprised 32 players and eight of them were seeded. Second-seeded John McEnroe was the defending Milan Indoor singles champion and retained the singles title after a straight-sets win in the final against first-seeded Björn Borg, 7–6^{(7–2)}, 6–4.

== Seeds ==
1. (Sweden) Björn Borg (final)
2. (United States) John McEnroe (champion)
3. (United States) Gene Mayer (quarterfinals)
4. (United States) Brian Gottfried (second round)
5. (United States) John Sadri (first round)
6. (India) Vijay Amritraj (quarterfinals)
7. (United States) Bob Lutz (first round)
8. (Czechoslovakia) Tomáš Šmíd (second round)

== Draw ==
Key

- Q = Qualifier
- WC = Wild card
- LL = Lucky loser
- Alt = Alternate
- ITF = ITF entry
- PR = Protected ranking
- SR = Special ranking
- SE = Special exempt
- JE = Junior exempt
- JR = Junior Accelerator Programme entrant
- CO = College Accelerator Programme entrant
- NG = Next Gen Accelerator Program entrant
- w/o = Walkover
- r = Retired
- d = Defaulted

=== Finals ===
Semifinals
1	(Sweden) Björn Borg	7	7
(Italy) Gianni Ocleppo	5	6
(United States) Sandy Mayer	3	4
2	(United States) John McEnroe	6	6

Final
1	(Sweden) Björn Borg	6	4
2	(United States) John McEnroe	7	6

=== Top half ===
First Round
1	(Sweden) Björn Borg	6	6
(United States) Trey Waltke	1	3
(France) Christophe Roger-Vasselin	2	2
(United States) Bill Scanlon	6	6
(Brazil) Carlos Kirmayr	6	6
(Italy) Adriano Panatta	0	2
(United States) Stan Smith	6	6
7	(United States) Bob Lutz	3	2
3	(United States) Gene Mayer	7	6
(Ecuador) Andrés Gómez	6	1
(Sweden) Mats Wilander	3	1
(United States) Peter Rennert	6	6
Q	(United States) Tim Wilkison	4	2
(Italy) Gianni Ocleppo	6	6
(United States) Victor Amaya	7	6
5	(United States) John Sadri	6	2

Second Round
1	(Sweden) Björn Borg	6	5	6
(United States) Bill Scanlon	1	7	3
(Brazil) Carlos Kirmayr	3	6
(United States) Stan Smith	6	7
3	(United States) Gene Mayer	6	6
(United States) Peter Rennert	4	2
(Italy) Gianni Ocleppo	6
(United States) Victor Amaya	5^{d}

Quarterfinals
1	(Sweden) Björn Borg	6	6
(United States) Stan Smith	0	2
3	(United States) Gene Mayer	3	1^{r}
(Italy) Gianni Ocleppo	6	4

Semifinals
1	(Sweden) Björn Borg	7	7
(Italy) Gianni Ocleppo	5	6

=== Bottom half ===
First Round
8	(Czechoslovakia) Tomáš Šmíd	6	6
Q	(United Kingdom) Richard Lewis	3	0
(France) Jean-François Caujolle	3	2
(United States) Butch Walts	6	6
(United States) Fritz Buehning	2	2
(United States) Sandy Mayer	6	6
(West Germany) Rolf Gehring	1	1
4	(United States) Brian Gottfried	6	6
6	(India) Vijay Amritraj	4	6	6
(United States) Ferdi Taygan	6	3	1
(Socialist Federal Republic of Yugoslavia) Željko Franulović	6	4	6
(United States) Tim Gullikson	4	6	7
(Italy) Paolo Bertolucci	2	4
(Switzerland) Heinz Günthardt	6	6
(Mexico) Raúl Ramírez	6	4
2	(United States) John McEnroe	7	6

Second Round
8	(Czechoslovakia) Tomáš Šmíd	6	2
(United States) Butch Walts	7	6
(United States) Sandy Mayer	6	6
4	(United States) Brian Gottfried	1	4
6	(India) Vijay Amritraj	6	6	6
(United States) Tim Gullikson	3	7	3
(Switzerland) Heinz Günthardt	2	3
2	(United States) John McEnroe	6	6

Quarterfinals
(United States) Butch Walts	2	6	5
(United States) Sandy Mayer	6	4	7
6	(India) Vijay Amritraj	3	7	2
2	(United States) John McEnroe	6	5	6

Semifinals
(United States) Sandy Mayer	3	4
2	(United States) John McEnroe	6	6

== See also ==
- Borg–McEnroe rivalry
