= 1980 Fischer-Grand Prix – Singles =

Singles
- 1980 Fischer-Grand Prix

Final
- Champion: (United States) Brian Gottfried
- Runner-up: (United States) Trey Waltke
- Score: 6–2, 6–4, 6–3

Details
- Draw: 48
- Seeds: 16

Events
Singles	Doubles
← 1979 ·	Vienna Open	· 1981 →

Stan Smith was the defending champion but lost in the second round to Raymond Moore.

Brian Gottfried won in the final 6–2, 6–4, 6–3 against Trey Waltke.

== Seeds ==
The draw allocated unseeded players at random; as a result three seeds and one lucky loser received a bye into the second round.

1. (United States) Brian Gottfried (champion)
2. (France) Yannick Noah (semifinals)
3. (Hungary) Balázs Taróczy (semifinals)
4. (Italy) Corrado Barazzutti (second round)
5. (United States) Stan Smith (second round)
6. (Switzerland) Heinz Günthardt (third round)
7. (United States) Bob Lutz (third round)
8. (Czechoslovakia) Tomáš Šmíd (quarterfinals)
9. (Mexico) Raúl Ramírez (first round)
10. n/a
11. (West Germany) Rolf Gehring (quarterfinals)
12. (South Africa) Bernard Mitton (second round)
13. (Italy) Gianni Ocleppo (first round)
14. (New Zealand) Chris Lewis (second round)
15. (France) Pascal Portes (third round)
16. (Australia) Colin Dibley (second round)

== Draw ==
=== Key ===
- Q = Qualifier
- WC = Wild card
- LL = Lucky loser
- Alt = Alternate
- SE = Special exempt
- PR = Protected ranking
- ITF = ITF entry
- JE = Junior exempt
- w/o = Walkover
- r = Retired
- d = Defaulted
- SR = Special ranking

=== Finals ===
Semifinals
1	(United States) Brian Gottfried	4	6	6
3	(Hungary) Balázs Taróczy	6	4	1
(United States) Trey Waltke	6	1	6
2	(France) Yannick Noah	3	6	4

Final
1	(United States) Brian Gottfried	6	6	6
(United States) Trey Waltke	2	4	3

=== Top half ===
==== Section 1 ====
First round
1	(United States) B Gottfried	6	6
(France) D Bedel	2	2
(New Zealand) O Parun	6	4	6
(France) T Tulasne	3	6	4
(Austria) H Kary	6	6
(United States) T Giammalva	1	2
(Italy) P Bertolucci	3	4
6	(Switzerland) H Günthardt	6	6

Second round
1	(United States) B Gottfried	6	7
(Spain) J López-Maeso	1	5
(New Zealand) O Parun	6	6
LL	(Czechoslovakia) P Hutka	4	0
14	(New Zealand) C Lewis	6	3	2
(Austria) H Kary	3	6	6
(Czechoslovakia) P Složil	3	6	0
6	(Switzerland) H Günthardt	6	3	6

Third round
1	(United States) B Gottfried	6	6
(New Zealand) O Parun	4	3
(Austria) H Kary	2	7	6
6	(Switzerland) H Günthardt	6	5	4

Quarterfinals
1	(United States) B Gottfried	6	6
(Austria) H Kary	1	2

==== Section 2 ====
First round
3	(Hungary) B Taróczy	6	6
(United Kingdom) M Cox	4	2
(United States) B Martin	6	6
(France) G Moretton	4	4
12	(South Africa) B Mitton	4	6	6
(West Germany) K Eberhard	6	1	4
(United Kingdom) A Jarrett	3	1
8	(Czechoslovakia) T Šmíd	6	6

Second round
3	(Hungary) B Taróczy	1	6	6
(South Africa) F McMillan	6	3	1
(United States) B Martin	4	3
15	(France) P Portes	6	6
12	(South Africa) B Mitton	6	2	2
(Czechoslovakia) S Birner	3	6	6
(United States) J Hayes	4	6
8	(Czechoslovakia) T Šmíd	6	7

Third round
3	(Hungary) B Taróczy	6	6
15	(France) P Portes	2	3
(Czechoslovakia) S Birner	4	4
8	(Czechoslovakia) T Šmíd	6	6

Quarterfinals
3	(Hungary) B Taróczy	3	6	6
8	(Czechoslovakia) T Šmíd	6	4	3

=== Bottom half ===
==== Section 3 ====
First round
7	(United States) B Lutz	2	6	6
(Sweden) P Hjertquist	6	2	4
(United States) T Waltke	6	7
13	(Italy) G Ocleppo	3	5
11	(West Germany) R Gehring	2	6	6
(Socialist Federal Republic of Yugoslavia) Ž Franulović	6	3	4
(Czechoslovakia) J Průcha	5	4
4	(Italy) C Barazzutti	7	6

Second round
7	(United States) B Lutz	6	6
(Australia) D Carter	4	1
(France) C Freyss	2	2
(United States) T Waltke	6	6
11	(West Germany) R Gehring	7	7
(West Germany) P Elter	6	5
(Austria) P Feigl	6	4	6
4	(Italy) C Barazzutti	0	6	1

Third round
7	(United States) B Lutz	4	4
(United States) T Waltke	6	6
11	(West Germany) R Gehring	4
(Austria) P Feigl	1	r

Quarterfinals
(United States) T Waltke	6	6
11	(West Germany) R Gehring	2	2

==== Section 4 ====
First round
5	(United States) S Smith	7	3	6
(Australia) P Kronk	6	6	1
(United States) E Fromm	7	6
(Spain) Á Giménez	5	4
9	(Mexico) R Ramírez	6	6	6
(New Zealand) R Simpson	7	4	7
(United States) N Saviano	4	6	2
2	(France) Y Noah	6	3	6

Second round
5	(United States) S Smith	6	5	3
(South Africa) R Moore	3	7	6
(United States) E Fromm	2	6	6
16	(Australia) C Dibley	6	3	1
(New Zealand) R Simpson	4	6	6
(Czechoslovakia) J Kodeš	6	0	2
(Israel) S Glickstein	5	6	1
2	(France) Y Noah	7	3	6

Third round
(South Africa) R Moore	6	6
(United States) E Fromm	3	3
(New Zealand) R Simpson	2	0
2	(France) Y Noah	6	6

Quarterfinals
(South Africa) R Moore	2	2
2	(France) Y Noah	6	6
