= 1981 Cuore Cup – Doubles =

Doubles
- 1981 Cuore Cup

Final
- Champion: (United States) Brian Gottfried (Mexico) Raúl Ramirez
- Runner-up: (United States) John McEnroe (United States) Peter Rennert
- Score: 7–6, 6–3

Details
- Draw: 16
- Seeds: 4

Events
Singles	Doubles
- Milan Indoor

The 1981 Cuore Cup – Doubles was an event of the 1981 Cuore Cup tennis tournament and was played on indoor carpet courts at the Palazzo dello Sport in Milan, Italy, between 23 March and 29 March 1981. The draw consisted of 16 teams and four of them were seeded. Peter Fleming and John McEnroe were the defending Milan Indoor doubles champions bur did not compete together in this edition. The third-seeded team of Brian Gottfried and Raúl Ramirez won the doubles title after a straight-sets win in the final against unseeded pairing John McEnroe and Peter Rennert, 7–6, 6–3.

== Seeds ==
1. (United States) Bob Lutz / (United States) Stan Smith (first round)
2. (United States) Gene Mayer / (United States) Sandy Mayer (first round)
3. (United States) Brian Gottfried / (Mexico) Raúl Ramírez (champions)
4. (United States) Victor Amaya / (United States) Steve Denton (first round, withdrew)

== Draw ==
Key

- Q = Qualifier
- WC = Wild card
- LL = Lucky loser
- Alt = Alternate
- ITF = ITF entry
- PR = Protected ranking
- SR = Special ranking
- SE = Special exempt
- JE = Junior exempt
- JR = Junior Accelerator Programme entrant
- CO = College Accelerator Programme entrant
- NG = Next Gen Accelerator Program entrant
- w/o = Walkover
- r = Retired
- d = Defaulted

First Round
1	(United States) Bob Lutz (United States) Stan Smith	6	3	5
(Switzerland) Heinz Günthardt (Czechoslovakia) Tomáš Šmíd	3	6	7
(United States) Fritz Buehning (United States) Ferdi Taygan	6	6
(Australia) Mark Edmondson (United States) Butch Walts	2	4
4	(United States) Victor Amaya (United States) Steve Denton
(United States) John McEnroe (United States) Peter Rennert	w/o
(Italy) Gianni Ocleppo (United States) Trey Waltke	6	7
(Italy) Claudio Panatta (United States) Vincent Van Patten	1	5
(Italy) Paolo Bertolucci (Italy) Adriano Panatta	7	6
(Italy) Gianni Marchetti (Italy) Enzo Vattuone	6	3
(United Kingdom) Richard Lewis (Venezuela) Fabio Mion-Bet	4	0
3	(United States) Brian Gottfried (Mexico) Raúl Ramírez	6	6
(Socialist Federal Republic of Yugoslavia) Željko Franulović (Brazil) Carlos Kirmayr	6	6
(Italy) Fabio Moscino (Italy) Torquato Rossini	2	2
(United States) Tim Gullikson (United States) Fred McNair	6	6
2	(United States) Gene Mayer (United States) Sandy Mayer	4	3

Quarterfinals
(Switzerland) Heinz Günthardt (Czechoslovakia) Tomáš Šmíd	6	6
(United States) Fritz Buehning (United States) Ferdi Taygan	4	4
(United States) John McEnroe (United States) Peter Rennert	6	6
(Italy) Gianni Ocleppo (United States) Trey Waltke	4	3
(Italy) Paolo Bertolucci (Italy) Adriano Panatta	6	5	2
3	(United States) Brian Gottfried (Mexico) Raúl Ramírez	3	7	6
(Socialist Federal Republic of Yugoslavia) Željko Franulović (Brazil) Carlos Kirmayr	4	1
(United States) Tim Gullikson (United States) Fred McNair	6	6

Semifinals
(Switzerland) Heinz Günthardt (Czechoslovakia) Tomáš Šmíd	6	2
(United States) John McEnroe (United States) Peter Rennert	7	6
3	(United States) Brian Gottfried (Mexico) Raúl Ramírez	6	6
(United States) Tim Gullikson (United States) Fred McNair	4	4

Final
(United States) John McEnroe (United States) Peter Rennert	6	3
3	(United States) Brian Gottfried (Mexico) Raúl Ramírez	7	6
