= 1982 Custom Credit Australian Indoor Championships =

- Date: 11–17 October
- Edition: 10th
- Draw: 32S / 16D
- Prize money: $200,000
- Surface: Hard / indoor
- Location: Sydney, Australia
- Venue: Hordern Pavilion

Champions

Singles
- (United States) John McEnroe

Doubles
- (United States) John McEnroe / (United States) Peter Rennert
← 1981 ·	Australian Indoor Tennis Championships	· 1983 →

The 1982 Custom Credit Australian Indoor Championships was a men's tennis tournament played on indoor hard courts at the Hordern Pavilion in Sydney, Australia and was part of the 1982 Volvo Grand Prix. It was the 10th edition of the tournament and was held from 11 October through 17 October 1982. Second-seeded John McEnroe won his third successive singles title at the event.

== Finals ==
=== Singles ===
(United States) John McEnroe defeated (United States) Gene Mayer 6–4, 6–1, 6–4

- It was McEnroe's 3rd singles title of the year and the 37th of his career.

=== Doubles ===
(United States) John McEnroe / (United States) Peter Rennert defeated (United States) Steve Denton / (Australia) Mark Edmondson 6–3, 7–6

- It was McEnroe's 5th title of the year and the 79th of his career. It was Rennert's 2nd title of the year and the 2nd of his career.
