= 1979 Fischer-Grand Prix – Singles =

Singles
- 1979 Fischer-Grand Prix

Final
- Champion: (United States) Stan Smith
- Runner-up: (Poland) Wojciech Fibak
- Score: 6–4, 6–0, 6–2

Details
- Draw: 48
- Seeds: 16

Events
Singles	Doubles
← 1978 ·	Vienna Open	· 1980 →

Stan Smith was the defending champion and won in the final 6–4, 6–0, 6–2 against Wojciech Fibak.

== Seeds ==
The draw allocated unseeded players at random; as a result five seeds received byes into the second round.

1. (United States) Eddie Dibbs (third round)
2. (United States) Gene Mayer (semifinals)
3. (Poland) Wojciech Fibak (final)
4. (United States) Brian Gottfried (second round)
5. (United States) Stan Smith (champion)
6. (United States) Eliot Teltscher (second round)
7. (South Africa) Johan Kriek (third round)
8. (Italy) Corrado Barazzutti (quarterfinals)
9. (Czechoslovakia) Ivan Lendl (semifinals)
10. (United States) Vince Van Patten (second round)
11. (Mexico) Raúl Ramírez (third round)
12. (Hungary) Balázs Taróczy (second round)
13. (Netherlands) Tom Okker (second round)
14. (Switzerland) Heinz Günthardt (third round)
15. (Czechoslovakia) Pavel Složil (second round)
16. (Socialist Federal Republic of Yugoslavia) Željko Franulović (quarterfinals)

== Draw ==
=== Key ===
- Q = Qualifier
- WC = Wild card
- LL = Lucky loser
- Alt = Alternate
- SE = Special exempt
- PR = Protected ranking
- ITF = ITF entry
- JE = Junior exempt
- w/o = Walkover
- r = Retired
- d = Defaulted
- SR = Special ranking

=== Finals ===
Semifinals
9	(Czechoslovakia) Ivan Lendl	4	2
5	(United States) Stan Smith	6	6
3	(Poland) Wojciech Fibak	4	6	6
2	(United States) Gene Mayer	6	4	2

Final
5	(United States) Stan Smith	6	6	6
3	(Poland) Wojciech Fibak	4	0	2

=== Top half ===
==== Section 1 ====
First round
(United States) T Gullikson	6	5	3
(West Germany) K Meiler	1	7	6
(United States) F Taygan	3	2
9	(Czechoslovakia) I Lendl	6	6
12	(Hungary) B Taróczy	6	6
(France) P Proisy	3	1
(South Africa) K Curren	6	7
Q	(Czechoslovakia) J Hřebec	1	6

Second round
1	(United States) E Dibbs	6	6
(West Germany) K Meiler	3	1
(Australia) S Docherty	0	6
9	(Czechoslovakia) I Lendl	6	7
12	(Hungary) B Taróczy	4	4
Q	(Sweden) T Svensson	6	6
(South Africa) K Curren	7	3	1
8	(Italy) C Barazzutti	6	6	6

Third round
1	(United States) E Dibbs	1	7	3
9	(Czechoslovakia) I Lendl	6	6	6
Q	(Sweden) T Svensson	2	4
8	(Italy) C Barazzutti	6	6

Quarterfinals
9	(Czechoslovakia) I Lendl	7	6
8	(Italy) C Barazzutti	5	2

==== Section 2 ====
First round
4	(United States) B Gottfried	6	6
(France) C Freyss	3	1
(United Kingdom) M Cox	6	6
(United States) E Fromm	4	1
Q	(South Africa) B Hewitt	5	6	2
(France) P Portes	7	4	6
(United States) G Malin	7	2	2
6	(United States) S Smith	6	6	6

Second round
4	(United States) B Gottfried	4	6	4
(South Africa) R Moore	6	4	6
(United Kingdom) M Cox	6	6
11	(Netherlands) T Okker	1	2
14	(Czechoslovakia) P Složil	6	2	1
(France) P Portes	0	6	6
(United States) N Saviano	6	4
5	(United States) S Smith	7	6

Third round
(South Africa) R Moore	4	4
(United Kingdom) M Cox	6	6
(France) P Portes	2	6	1
5	(United States) S Smith	6	3	6

Quarterfinals
(United Kingdom) M Cox	4	3
5	(United States) S Smith	6	6

=== Bottom half ===
==== Section 3 ====
First round
7	(South Africa) J Kriek	5	6	6
(Austria) R Reininger	7	2	3
(Austria) H Kary	4	3
16	(Socialist Federal Republic of Yugoslavia) Ž Franulović	6	6
10	(United States) V Van Patten	6	6
(Chile) A Fillol	4	2
(United States) B Manson	0	7	2
4	(Poland) W Fibak	6	6	6

Second round
7	(South Africa) J Kriek	6	6
Q	(Chile) J Fillol	1	3
(Netherlands) L Sanders	4	4
16	(Socialist Federal Republic of Yugoslavia) Ž Franulović	6	6
10	(United States) V Van Patten	6	6	6
(France) J-L Haillet	7	2	7
Q	(Sweden) U Eriksson	4	4
3	(Poland) W Fibak	6	6

Third round
7	(South Africa) J Kriek	0	6	1
16	(Socialist Federal Republic of Yugoslavia) Ž Franulović	6	1	6
(France) J-L Haillet	2	2
3	(Poland) W Fibak	6	6

Quarterfinals
16	(Socialist Federal Republic of Yugoslavia) Ž Franulović	4	4
3	(Poland) W Fibak	6	6

==== Section 4 ====
First round
6	(United States) E Teltscher	6	6
(United States) T Waltke	4	0
Q	(United States) F Buehning	7	4	7
Q	(United Kingdom) R Lewis	6	6	6
11	(Mexico) R Ramírez	6	6
(Brazil) T Koch	4	2
(Sweden) B Andersson	4	3
2	(United States) G Mayer	6	6

Second round
6	(United States) E Teltscher	6	7	3
(South Africa) F McMillan	7	6	6
Q	(United States) F Buehning	3	6	2
14	(Switzerland) H Günthardt	6	1	6
11	(Mexico) R Ramírez	6	7
(Austria) R Stiegler	4	5
(South Africa) D Schneider	1	3
2	(United States) G Mayer	6	6

Third round
(South Africa) F McMillan	4	7	6
14	(Switzerland) H Günthardt	6	5	2
11	(Mexico) R Ramírez	1	2
2	(United States) G Mayer	6	6

Quarterfinals
(South Africa) F McMillan	1	6	4
2	(United States) G Mayer	6	3	6
