= 1982 Custom Credit Australian Indoor Championships – Singles =

Singles
- 1982 Custom Credit Australian Indoor Championships

Final
- Champion: (United States) John McEnroe
- Runner-up: (United States) Gene Mayer
- Score: 6–4, 6–1, 6–4

Details
- Draw: 32
- Seeds: 8

Events
Singles	Doubles
← 1981 ·	Australian Indoor Tennis Championships	· 1983 →

John McEnroe was the defending champion and won in the final 6–4, 6–1, 6–4 against Gene Mayer.

== Seeds ==
1. (United States) Jimmy Connors (semifinals)
2. (United States) John McEnroe (champion)
3. (United States) Vitas Gerulaitis (first round)
4. (United States) Gene Mayer (final)
5. (Australia) Peter McNamara (quarterfinals)
6. (United States) Eliot Teltscher (quarterfinals)
7. (United States) Steve Denton (semifinals)
8. (Australia) Mark Edmondson (second round)

== Draw ==
=== Key ===
- Q = Qualifier
- WC = Wild card
- LL = Lucky loser
- Alt = Alternate
- SE = Special exempt
- PR = Protected ranking
- ITF = ITF entry
- JE = Junior exempt
- w/o = Walkover
- r = Retired
- d = Defaulted
- SR = Special ranking

=== Finals ===
Semifinals
1	(United States) Jimmy Connors	3	6	3
4	(United States) Gene Mayer	6	2	6
7	(United States) Steve Denton	3	1
2	(United States) John McEnroe	6	6

Final
4	(United States) Gene Mayer	4	1	4
2	(United States) John McEnroe	6	6	6

=== Section 1 ===
First round
1	(United States) J Connors	6	6
Q	(Australia) B Guan	0	3
(Australia) J Frawley	7	7
(Australia) C Letcher	6	5
(Australia) P McNamee	5	6	6
(Australia) B Dyke	7	1	4
(United States) P Rennert	3	3
6	(United States) E Teltscher	6	6
4	(United States) G Mayer	6	6
(Australia) W Masur	3	4
(United States) M Mitchell	6	6	7
(Australia) J Fitzgerald	3	7	6
(Australia) J Alexander	6	6
(Australia) D Carter	3	3
(United States) R Royer	3	4
8	(Australia) M Edmondson	6	6

Second round
1	(United States) J Connors	6	6
(Australia) J Frawley	1	0
(Australia) P McNamee	4	7	6
6	(United States) E Teltscher	6	5	7
4	(United States) G Mayer	7	6
(United States) M Mitchell	6	0
(Australia) J Alexander	7	6
8	(Australia) M Edmondson	5	3

Quarterfinals
1	(United States) J Connors	6	6
6	(United States) E Teltscher	2	3
4	(United States) G Mayer	6	6
(Australia) J Alexander	3	4

Semifinals
1	(United States) J Connors	3	6	3
4	(United States) G Mayer	6	2	6

=== Section 2 ===
First round
7	(United States) S Denton	6	7
Q	(Australia) G Whitecross	1	6
(United States) T Waltke	6	7
Q	(Australia) R Case	1	5
(Australia) P Dent	6	6	6
(Australia) P Cash	3	7	7
(United States) B Gilbert	6	6
3	(United States) V Gerulaitis	3	4
5	(Australia) P McNamara	6	6
(Australia) C Miller	3	3
(United States) J Sadri	2	3
(Australia) B Drewett	6	6
Q	(United States) C Mayotte	1	7	4
(Australia) C Johnstone	6	5	6
(Australia) R Frawley	3	4
2	(United States) J McEnroe	6	6

Second round
7	(United States) S Denton	6	6
(United States) T Waltke	1	3
(Australia) P Cash	6	4	1
(United States) B Gilbert	1	6	6
5	(Australia) P McNamara	7	5	6
(Australia) B Drewett	6	7	3
(Australia) C Johnstone	1	3
2	(United States) J McEnroe	6	6

Quarterfinals
7	(United States) S Denton	6	6	6
(United States) B Gilbert	7	3	3
5	(Australia) P McNamara	4	4
2	(United States) J McEnroe	6	6

Semifinals
7	(United States) S Denton	3	1
2	(United States) J McEnroe	6	6
