= 1982 Custom Credit Australian Indoor Championships – Doubles =

Doubles
- 1982 Custom Credit Australian Indoor Championships

Final
- Champions: (United States) John McEnroe (United States) Peter Rennert
- Runners-up: (United States) Steve Denton (Australia) Mark Edmondson
- Score: 6–3, 7–6

Details
- Draw: 16
- Seeds: 4

Events
Singles	Doubles
- Australian Indoor Tennis Championships

Peter Fleming and John McEnroe were the defending champions but only McEnroe competed that year with Peter Rennert.

McEnroe and Rennert won in the final 6–3, 7–6 against Steve Denton and Mark Edmondson.

== Seeds ==
1. (Australia) Peter McNamara / (Australia) Paul McNamee (first round)
2. (United States) Steve Denton / (Australia) Mark Edmondson (final)
3. (United States) Sherwood Stewart / (United States) Ferdi Taygan (semifinals)
4. (United States) John McEnroe / (United States) Peter Rennert (champions)

== Draw ==
Key

- Q = Qualifier
- WC = Wild card
- LL = Lucky loser
- Alt = Alternate
- ITF = ITF entry
- PR = Protected ranking
- SR = Special ranking
- SE = Special exempt
- JE = Junior exempt
- JR = Junior Accelerator Programme entrant
- CO = College Accelerator Programme entrant
- NG = Next Gen Accelerator Program entrant
- w/o = Walkover
- r = Retired
- d = Defaulted

First round
1	(Australia) P McNamara (Australia) P McNamee	6	3
(United States) C Mayotte (United States) T Waltke	7	6
(Australia) J Alexander (Australia) J Fitzgerald	6	6
(Australia) D Graham (Australia) L Warder	4	3
4	(United States) J McEnroe (United States) P Rennert	4	6	6
(Australia) B Drewett (Australia) C Letcher	6	2	3
(Paraguay) F González (United States) M Mitchell	7	6	7
(Australia) S Ball (Australia) P Dent	6	7	6
(Australia) B Dyke (Australia) W Hampson	7	3	7
(Australia) P Cash (Australia) W Masur	6	6	6
(Australia) C Johnstone (Australia) C Miller	1	0
3	(United States) S Stewart (United States) F Taygan	6	6
(Australia) R Case (Australia) R Frawley	6	3	6
(United States) D Dowlen (United States) R Royer	4	6	3
(Australia) B Guan (Australia) W Maher	3	2
2	(United States) S Denton (Australia) M Edmondson	6	6

Quarterfinals
(United States) C Mayotte (United States) T Waltke	1	4
(Australia) J Alexander (Australia) J Fitzgerald	6	6
4	(United States) J McEnroe (United States) P Rennert	7	6
(Paraguay) F González (United States) M Mitchell	6	3
(Australia) B Dyke (Australia) W Hampson	3	4
3	(United States) S Stewart (United States) F Taygan	6	6
(Australia) R Case (Australia) R Frawley	0	1
2	(United States) S Denton (Australia) M Edmondson	6	6

Semifinals
(Australia) J Alexander (Australia) J Fitzgerald	6	6	4
4	(United States) J McEnroe (United States) P Rennert	7	4	6
3	(United States) S Stewart (United States) F Taygan	3	3
2	(United States) S Denton (Australia) M Edmondson	6	6

Final
4	(United States) J McEnroe (United States) P Rennert	6	7
2	(United States) S Denton (Australia) M Edmondson	3	6
