= 1981 Custom Credit Australian Indoor Championships – Singles =

Singles
- 1981 Custom Credit Australian Indoor Championships

Final
- Champion: (United States) John McEnroe
- Runner-up: (United States) Roscoe Tanner
- Score: 6–4, 7–5, 6–2

Details
- Draw: 32
- Seeds: 8

Events
Singles	Doubles
← 1980 ·	Australian Indoor Tennis Championships	· 1982 →

John McEnroe was the defending champion and won in the final 6–4, 7–5, 6–2 against Roscoe Tanner.

== Seeds ==
1. (United States) John McEnroe (champion)
2. (United States) Roscoe Tanner (final)
3. (United States) Eliot Teltscher (semifinals)
4. (Australia) Peter McNamara (quarterfinals)
5. (United States) Vitas Gerulaitis (quarterfinals)
6. (Paraguay) Víctor Pecci (quarterfinals)
7. (Australia) Kim Warwick (first round)
8. (United States) Tom Gullikson (quarterfinals)

== Draw ==
=== Key ===
- Q = Qualifier
- WC = Wild card
- LL = Lucky loser
- Alt = Alternate
- SE = Special exempt
- PR = Protected ranking
- ITF = ITF entry
- JE = Junior exempt
- w/o = Walkover
- r = Retired
- d = Defaulted
- SR = Special ranking

=== Finals ===
Semifinals
1	(United States) John McEnroe	7	7
3	(United States) Eliot Teltscher	5	6
(Australia) John Fitzgerald	2	3
2	(United States) Roscoe Tanner	6	6

Final
1	(United States) John McEnroe	6	7	6
2	(United States) Roscoe Tanner	4	5	2

=== Section 1 ===
First round
1	(United States) J McEnroe	6	6
(Australia) B Drewett	1	4
(Australia) R Frawley	6	7
(United States) P Fleming	4	6
(Australia) M Edmondson	6	6
(Australia) P Dent	4	1
(Australia) C Fancutt	3	5
8	(United States) Tom Gullikson	6	7
3	(United States) E Teltscher	7	6
(United States) T Graham	5	1
(Australia) J Alexander	6	6
(Australia) W Hampson	2	2
(United States) B Manson	6	6
(United States) S Stewart	3	4
(New Zealand) D Mustard	2	3
5	(United States) V Gerulaitis	6	6

Second round
1	(United States) J McEnroe	6	7
(Australia) R Frawley	1	5
(Australia) M Edmondson	3	4
8	(United States) Tom Gullikson	6	6
3	(United States) E Teltscher	6	7
(Australia) J Alexander	4	5
(United States) B Manson	1	3
5	(United States) V Gerulaitis	6	6

Quarterfinals
1	(United States) J McEnroe	6	6
8	(United States) Tom Gullikson	0	1
3	(United States) E Teltscher	7	6
5	(United States) V Gerulaitis	5	3

Semifinals
1	(United States) J McEnroe	7	7
3	(United States) E Teltscher	5	6

=== Section 2 ===
First round
7	(Australia) K Warwick	4	4
(United States) J Delaney	6	6
(Australia) J Fitzgerald	6	6
(Australia) P Kronk	3	4
(United States) P Rennert	4	6	3
(United States) Tim Gullikson	6	3	6
(Australia) B Guan	4	1
4	(Australia) P McNamara	6	6
6	(Paraguay) V Pecci	6	2	6
(United States) J Benson	3	6	4
(Australia) S Ball	6	6
(Australia) R Case	3	4
(Australia) C Miller	2	6	3
(United States) F Taygan	6	3	6
(Australia) C Johnstone	4	6
2	(United States) R Tanner	6	7

Second round
(United States) J Delaney	5	2
(Australia) J Fitzgerald	7	6
(United States) Tim Gullikson	3	2
4	(Australia) P McNamara	6	6
6	(Paraguay) V Pecci	3	6	6
(Australia) S Ball	6	3	3
(United States) F Taygan	3	0
2	(United States) R Tanner	6	6

Quarterfinals
(Australia) J Fitzgerald	6	4	6
4	(Australia) P McNamara	2	6	3
6	(Paraguay) V Pecci	4	4
2	(United States) R Tanner	6	6

Semifinals
(Australia) J Fitzgerald	2	3
2	(United States) R Tanner	6	6
