= 1981 Fischer-Grand Prix – Singles =

Singles
- 1981 Fischer-Grand Prix

Final
- Champion: (Czechoslovakia) Ivan Lendl
- Runner-up: (United States) Brian Gottfried
- Score: 1–6, 6–0, 6–1, 6–2

Details
- Draw: 48
- Seeds: 16

Events
| Singles | Doubles |
| ← 1980 · | Vienna Open | · 1982 → |

Brian Gottfried was the defending champion but lost in the final 1–6, 6–0, 6–1, 6–2 to Ivan Lendl.

== Seeds ==
The draw allocated unseeded players at random; as a result seven seeds received a bye into the second round.

1. (Czechoslovakia) Ivan Lendl (champion)
2. (United States) Brian Gottfried (final)
3. (United States) Stan Smith (semifinals)
4. (Czechoslovakia) Tomáš Šmíd (semifinals)
5. (United States) Sandy Mayer (quarterfinals)
6. (West Germany) Rolf Gehring (quarterfinals)
7. (Brazil) Carlos Kirmayr (quarterfinals)
8. (Israel) Shlomo Glickstein (second round)
9. (United States) John Austin (third round)
10. (United States) Sammy Giammalva Jr. (second round)
11. (Czechoslovakia) Stanislav Birner (third round)
12. (Czechoslovakia) Pavel Složil (third round)
13. (West Germany) Ulrich Pinner (first round)
14. (United States) Trey Waltke (first round)
15. (Spain) Ángel Giménez (first round)
16. (United States) Nick Saviano (third round)

== Draw ==
=== Key ===
- Q = Qualifier
- WC = Wild card
- LL = Lucky loser
- Alt = Alternate
- SE = Special exempt
- PR = Protected ranking
- ITF = ITF entry
- JE = Junior exempt
- w/o = Walkover
- r = Retired
- d = Defaulted
- SR = Special ranking

=== Finals ===
Semifinals
1 | (Czechoslovakia) Ivan Lendl | 6 | 6
4 | (Czechoslovakia) Tomáš Šmíd | 2 | 2
3 | (United States) Stan Smith | 3 | 4
2 | (United States) Brian Gottfried | 6 | 6

Final
1 | (Czechoslovakia) Ivan Lendl | 1 | 6 | 6 | 6
2 | (United States) Brian Gottfried | 6 | 0 | 1 | 2

=== Top half ===
==== Section 1 ====
First round
(United States) E Fromm | 6 | 6
(Austria) I Wimmer | 2 | 2
Q | (West Germany) K Meiler | 6 | 4 | 6
14 | (United States) T Waltke | 4 | 6 | 2
(United States) M Doyle | 6 | 6
(Austria) B Pils | 4 | 1
(Czechoslovakia) J Hřebec | 4 | 1
5 | (United States) S Mayer | 6 | 6

Second round
1 | (Czechoslovakia) I Lendl | 6 | 6
(United States) E Fromm | 2 | 1
(Switzerland) R Stadler | 6 | 7
Q | (West Germany) K Meiler | 4 | 6
10 | (United States) S Giammalva Jr. | 2 | 6
(United States) M Doyle | 6 | 7
(United States) T Wilkison | 2 | 6 | 0
5 | (United States) S Mayer | 6 | 2 | 6

Third round
1 | (Czechoslovakia) I Lendl | 6 | 6
(Switzerland) R Stadler | 1 | 3
(United States) M Doyle | 7 | 5 | 4
5 | (United States) S Mayer | 6 | 7 | 6

Quarterfinals
1 | (Czechoslovakia) I Lendl | 7 | 6
5 | (United States) S Mayer | 5 | 4

==== Section 2 ====
First round
(South Africa) B Mitton | 7 | 6
(West Germany) K Eberhard | 6 | 4
(United Kingdom) J Smith | 6 | 2 | 6
15 | (Spain) Á Giménez | 1 | 6 | 4
13 | (West Germany) U Pinner | 4 | 5
Q | (United Kingdom) R Lewis | 6 | 7
(United States) S Denton | 5 | 6
8 | (Israel) S Glickstein | 7 | 7

Second round
4 | (Czechoslovakia) T Šmíd | 7 | 6
(South Africa) B Mitton | 6 | 3
(Socialist Federal Republic of Yugoslavia) M Ostoja | 2 | 6 | 3
(United Kingdom) J Smith | 6 | 2 | 6
Q | (United Kingdom) R Lewis | 6 | 4
Q | (West Germany) C Zipf | 7 | 6
(France) J Potier | w/o
8 | (Israel) S Glickstein

Third round
4 | (Czechoslovakia) T Šmíd | 6 | 6
(United Kingdom) J Smith | 1 | 4
Q | (West Germany) C Zipf | 6 | 5 | 5
(France) J Potier | 2 | 7 | 7

Quarterfinals
4 | (Czechoslovakia) T Šmíd | 6 | 6
(France) J Potier | 1 | 1

=== Bottom half ===
==== Section 3 ====
First round
(Austria) H Kary | 6 | 6
(Czechoslovakia) P Hutka | 4 | 1
Q | (Czechoslovakia) M Lacek | 1 | 2
11 | (Czechoslovakia) S Birner | 6 | 6
9 | (United States) J Austin | 6 | 6
Q | (United States) S Meister | 2 | 4
(Austria) P Feigl | 6 | 6
(United States) C Mayotte | 3 | 3

Second round
6 | (West Germany) R Gehring | 6 | 4 | 7
(Austria) H Kary | 3 | 6 | 6
(Austria) H-P Kandler | 1 | 3
11 | (Czechoslovakia) S Birner | 6 | 6
9 | (United States) J Austin | 6 | 2 | 7
(United States) D Siegler | 2 | 6 | 6
(Austria) P Feigl | 3 | 1
3 | (United States) S Smith | 6 | 6

Third round
6 | (West Germany) R Gehring | 6 | 6
11 | (Czechoslovakia) S Birner | 2 | 3
9 | (United States) J Austin | 2 | 4
3 | (United States) S Smith | 6 | 6

Quarterfinals
6 | (West Germany) R Gehring | 3 | 3
3 | (United States) S Smith | 6 | 6

==== Section 4 ====
First round
7 | (Brazil) C Kirmayr | 6 | 7
(United States) J Lapidus | 2 | 5
(Czechoslovakia) J Granát | 6 | 7
(Brazil) J Soares | 2 | 5
(Zimbabwe) A Pattison | 7 | 6
(United States) J Hayes | 6 | 2
(United States) B Martin | 2 | 1
2 | (United States) B Gottfried | 6 | 6

Second round
7 | (Brazil) C Kirmayr | 7 | 7
(Netherlands) L Sanders | 6 | 6
(Czechoslovakia) J Granát | 6 | 6 | 4
12 | (Czechoslovakia) P Složil | 4 | 7 | 6
16 | (United States) N Saviano | 7 | 6
(Zimbabwe) A Pattison | 6 | 1
(United States) M Vines | 2 | 2
2 | (United States) B Gottfried | 6 | 6

Third round
7 | (Brazil) C Kirmayr | 2 | 6 | 6
12 | (Czechoslovakia) P Složil | 6 | 4 | 3
16 | (United States) N Saviano | 5 | 2
2 | (United States) B Gottfried | 7 | 6

Quarterfinals
7 | (Brazil) C Kirmayr | 2 | 6 | 4
2 | (United States) B Gottfried | 6 | 4 | 6
