= 1979 Fischer-Grand Prix =

Tennis tournament

- Date: 22–28 October
- Edition: 5th
- Category: Grand Prix
- Draw: 32S / 16D
- Prize money: $100,000
- Surface: Hard / indoor
- Location: Vienna, Austria
- Venue: Wiener Stadthalle

Champions

Singles
- (United States) Stan Smith

Doubles
- (South Africa) Bob Hewitt / (South Africa) Frew McMillan
- Vienna Open

The 1979 Fischer-Grand Prix was a men's tennis tournament played on indoor hard courts at the Wiener Stadthalle in Vienna, Austria that was part of the 1979 Colgate-Palmolive Grand Prix. It was the fifth edition of the tournament and took place from 22 October until 28 October 1979. Fifth-seeded Stan Smith won his second consecutive singles title at the event.

== Finals ==
=== Singles ===
(United States) Stan Smith defeated (Poland) Wojciech Fibak 6–4, 6–0, 6–2

- It was Smith's 7th title of the year and the 79th of his career.

=== Doubles ===
(South Africa) Bob Hewitt / (South Africa) Frew McMillan defeated (United States) Brian Gottfried / (Mexico) Raúl Ramírez 6–1, 6–4

- It was Hewitt's 3rd title of the year and the 55th of his career. It was McMillan's 3rd title of the year and the 60th of his career.
