= 1981 Fischer-Grand Prix – Doubles =

Doubles
- 1981 Fischer-Grand Prix

Final
- Champions: (United States) Steve Denton (United States) Tim Wilkison
- Runners-up: (United States) Sammy Giammalva Jr. (United States) Fred McNair
- Score: 4–6, 6–3, 6–4

Details
- Draw: 24
- Seeds: 8

Events
Singles	Doubles
← 1980 ·	Vienna Open	· 1982 →

Bob Lutz and Stan Smith were the defending champions but only Smith competed that year with Brian Gottfried.

Gottfried and Smith lost in the quarterfinals to Steve Denton and Tim Wilkison.

Denton and Wilkison won in the final 4–6, 6–3, 6–4 against Sammy Giammalva Jr. and Fred McNair.

== Seeds ==
The draw allocated unseeded teams at random; as a result one seeded team received a bye into the second round.

1. (United States) Brian Gottfried / (United States) Stan Smith (quarterfinals)
2. (Czechoslovakia) Pavel Složil / (Czechoslovakia) Tomáš Šmíd (quarterfinals)
3. (United States) Sandy Mayer / (South Africa) Frew McMillan (semifinals)
4. (South Africa) Bernard Mitton / (Zimbabwe) Andrew Pattison (semifinals)
5. (Austria) Peter Feigl / (United States) Billy Martin (first round)
6. (United States) Sammy Giammalva Jr. / (United States) Fred McNair (final)
7. (United States) Steve Denton / (United States) Tim Wilkison (champions)
8. (Czechoslovakia) Stanislav Birner / (United States) Nick Saviano (quarterfinals)

== Draw ==
=== Key ===
- Q = Qualifier
- WC = Wild card
- LL = Lucky loser
- Alt = Alternate
- SE = Special exempt
- PR = Protected ranking
- ITF = ITF entry
- JE = Junior exempt
- w/o = Walkover
- r = Retired
- d = Defaulted
- SR = Special ranking

=== Final ===
Semifinals
7	(United States) Steve Denton (United States) Tim Wilkison	2	6	6
3	(United States) Sandy Mayer (South Africa) Frew McMillan	6	4	2
4	(South Africa) Bernard Mitton (Zimbabwe) Andrew Pattison	6	4
6	(United States) Sammy Giammalva Jr. (United States) Fred McNair	7	6

Final
7	(United States) Steve Denton (United States) Tim Wilkison	4	6	6
6	(United States) Sammy Giammalva Jr. (United States) Fred McNair	6	3	4

=== Top half ===
First round
(United Kingdom) R Lewis (United Kingdom) J Smith	6	6
(United States) E Fromm (United States) C Leeds	2	3
(Israel) S Glickstein (Israel) D Schneider	3	2
7	(United States) S Denton (United States) T Wilkison	6	6
3	(United States) S Mayer (South Africa) F McMillan	6	6	7
(United States) J Hayes (United States) S Meister	7	4	6
(Brazil) C Kirmayr (Brazil) J Soares	6	4	3
8	(Czechoslovakia) S Birner (United States) N Saviano	1	6	6

Second round
1	(United States) B Gottfried (United States) S Smith	6	6
(United Kingdom) R Lewis (United Kingdom) J Smith	3	2
(Spain) Á Giménez (Austria) H Kary	0	3
7	(United States) S Denton (United States) T Wilkison	6	6
3	(United States) S Mayer (South Africa) F McMillan	6	6
(Switzerland) R Stadler (United States) M Vines	3	2
(Austria) H-P Kandler (Austria) F Krajcik	5	5
8	(Czechoslovakia) S Birner (United States) N Saviano	7	7

Quarterfinals
1	(United States) B Gottfried (United States) S Smith	1	2
7	(United States) S Denton (United States) T Wilkison	6	6
3	(United States) S Mayer (South Africa) F McMillan	6	6
8	(Czechoslovakia) S Birner (United States) N Saviano	4	3

Semifinals
7	(United States) S Denton (United States) T Wilkison	2	6	6
3	(United States) S Mayer (South Africa) F McMillan	6	4	2

=== Bottom half ===
First round
5	(Austria) P Feigl (United States) B Martin	2	6	4
(Czechoslovakia) J Hřebec (Czechoslovakia) J Navrátil	6	3	6
(United Kingdom) J Feaver (West Germany) R Gehring	2	6
4	(South Africa) B Mitton (Zimbabwe) A Pattison	6	7
6	(United States) S Giammalva Jr. (United States) F McNair	6	7
(United States) D Siegler (United States) T Waltke	4	6
(West Germany) K Eberhard (West Germany) C Zipf	2	2
2	(Czechoslovakia) P Složil (Czechoslovakia) T Šmíd	6	6

Second round
(Czechoslovakia) J Hřebec (Czechoslovakia) J Navrátil	4	7	6
(Austria) B Pils (Austria) I Wimmer	6	6	7
(United States) M Doyle (United States) C Mayotte	6	6	3
4	(South Africa) B Mitton (Zimbabwe) A Pattison	4	7	6
6	(United States) S Giammalva Jr. (United States) F McNair	7	6
(United States) G Holroyd (United States) W Redondo	5	4
(Socialist Federal Republic of Yugoslavia) M Ostoja (Netherlands) L Sanders	2	2
2	(Czechoslovakia) P Složil (Czechoslovakia) T Šmíd	6	6

Quarterfinals
(Austria) B Pils (Austria) I Wimmer	5	2
4	(South Africa) B Mitton (Zimbabwe) A Pattison	7	6
6	(United States) S Giammalva Jr. (United States) F McNair	6	6
2	(Czechoslovakia) P Složil (Czechoslovakia) T Šmíd	3	4

Semifinals
4	(South Africa) B Mitton (Zimbabwe) A Pattison	6	4
6	(United States) S Giammalva Jr. (United States) F McNair	7	6
