= 1981 Custom Credit Australian Indoor Championships – Doubles =

Australian tennis tournament results

Doubles
- 1981 Custom Credit Australian Indoor Championships

Final
- Champions: (United States) Peter Fleming (United States) John McEnroe
- Runners-up: (United States) Sherwood Stewart (United States) Ferdi Taygan
- Score: 6–7, 7–6, 6–1

Details
- Draw: 16
- Seeds: 4

Events
| Singles | Doubles |
- Australian Indoor Tennis Championships

Peter Fleming and John McEnroe were the defending champions and won in the final 6–7, 7–6, 6–1 against Sherwood Stewart and Ferdi Taygan.

== Seeds ==
1. (United States) Peter Fleming / (United States) John McEnroe (champions)
2. (United States) Sherwood Stewart / (United States) Ferdi Taygan (final)
3. (Australia) Paul Kronk / (Australia) Peter McNamara (first round)
4. (United States) Bruce Manson / (United States) Peter Rennert (quarterfinals)

== Draw ==
Key

- Q = Qualifier
- WC = Wild card
- LL = Lucky loser
- Alt = Alternate
- ITF = ITF entry
- PR = Protected ranking
- SR = Special ranking
- SE = Special exempt
- JE = Junior exempt
- JR = Junior Accelerator Programme entrant
- CO = College Accelerator Programme entrant
- NG = Next Gen Accelerator Program entrant
- w/o = Walkover
- r = Retired
- d = Defaulted

First round
1 | (United States) P Fleming (United States) J McEnroe | 6 | 6 | 6
(United States) R Tanner (United States) E Teltscher | 2 | 7 | 4
(United States) T Graham (United States) M Mitchell | 7 | 6
(India) S Menon (Paraguay) V Pecci | 6 | 4
4 | (United States) B Manson (United States) P Rennert | 4 | 6 | 6
(Australia) S Ball (Australia) C Letcher | 6 | 4 | 4
(Australia) M Edmondson (United States) M Estep | 6 | 6 | 6
(Australia) J Newcombe (Australia) T Roche | 7 | 3 | 3
(Australia) J Alexander (Australia) P Dent | 7 | 4 | 6
(United States) J Benson (United States) D Dowlen | 5 | 6 | 3
(United States) Ti Gullikson (United States) To Gullikson | 7 | 2 | 6
3 | (Australia) P Kronk (Australia) P McNamara | 6 | 6 | 3
(Australia) B Drewett (Australia) J Fitzgerald | 6 | 7
(Australia) R Case (Australia) R Frawley | 4 | 6
(Australia) B Guan (Australia) W Hampson | 2 | 2
2 | (United States) S Stewart (United States) F Taygan | 6 | 6

Quarterfinals
1 | (United States) P Fleming (United States) J McEnroe | 6 | 6
(United States) T Graham (United States) M Mitchell | 4 | 2
4 | (United States) B Manson (United States) P Rennert | 6 | 3 | 4
(Australia) M Edmondson (United States) M Estep | 4 | 6 | 6
(Australia) J Alexander (Australia) P Dent | 5 | 4
(United States) Ti Gullikson (United States) To Gullikson | 7 | 6
(Australia) B Drewett (Australia) J Fitzgerald | 4 | 6
2 | (United States) S Stewart (United States) F Taygan | 6 | 7

Semifinals
1 | (United States) P Fleming (United States) J McEnroe | 6 | 6
(Australia) M Edmondson (United States) M Estep | 0 | 3
(United States) Ti Gullikson (United States) To Gullikson | 6 | 2
2 | (United States) S Stewart (United States) F Taygan | 7 | 6

Final
1 | (United States) P Fleming (United States) J McEnroe | 6 | 7 | 6
2 | (United States) S Stewart (United States) F Taygan | 7 | 6 | 1
