= 1978 Fischer-Grand Prix – Doubles =

Doubles
- 1978 Fischer-Grand Prix

Final
- Champions: (Paraguay) Víctor Pecci (Hungary) Balázs Taróczy
- Runners-up: (South Africa) Bob Hewitt (South Africa) Frew McMillan
- Score: 6–3, 6–7, 6–4

Details
- Draw: 16
- Seeds: 4

Events
Singles	Doubles
← 1977 ·	Vienna Open	· 1979 →

Bob Hewitt and Frew McMillan were the defending champions but lost in the final 6–3, 6–7, 6–4 to Víctor Pecci and Balázs Taróczy.

== Seeds ==
1. (South Africa) Bob Hewitt / (South Africa) Frew McMillan (final)
2. (United States) Brian Gottfried / (United States) Stan Smith (first round)
3. (Paraguay) Víctor Pecci / (Hungary) Balázs Taróczy (champions)
4. (Czechoslovakia) Jan Kodeš / (Czechoslovakia) Tomáš Šmíd (quarterfinals)

== Draw ==
=== Key ===
- Q = Qualifier
- WC = Wild card
- LL = Lucky loser
- Alt = Alternate
- SE = Special exempt
- PR = Protected ranking
- ITF = ITF entry
- JE = Junior exempt
- w/o = Walkover
- r = Retired
- d = Defaulted
- SR = Special ranking

First round
1	(South Africa) B Hewitt (South Africa) F McMillan	6	6
(United Kingdom) J Feaver (Australia) J James	3	3
(Chile) A Fillol (Chile) J Fillol	4	2
(Austria) H Kary (South Africa) B Mitton	6	6
4	(Czechoslovakia) J Kodeš (Czechoslovakia) T Šmíd	7	6
(United States) T Gullikson (United States) G Hardie	6	2
(Czechoslovakia) P Huťka (Sweden) J Svensson	1	4
(Australia) P Kronk (Australia) C Letcher	6	6
(United States) J Austin (United States) F Taygan	7	4	6
(Austria) P Feigl (United States) E Friedler	6	6	3
(Paraguay) F González (Spain) A Muñoz	5	4
3	(Paraguay) V Pecci (Hungary) B Taróczy	7	6
(United States) K Richardson (United States) J Sadri	7	6	4
(Sweden) O N Bengtson (United Kingdom) R Taylor	6	7	6
(South Africa) J Kriek (West Germany) K Meiler	6	6
2	(United States) B Gottfried (United States) S Smith	2	4

Quarterfinals
1	(South Africa) B Hewitt (South Africa) F McMillan	6	6
(Austria) H Kary (South Africa) B Mitton	2	2
4	(Czechoslovakia) J Kodeš (Czechoslovakia) T Šmíd	6	4
(Australia) P Kronk (Australia) C Letcher	7	6
(United States) J Austin (United States) F Taygan	4	2
3	(Paraguay) V Pecci (Hungary) B Taróczy	6	6
(Sweden) O N Bengtson (United Kingdom) R Taylor	1	5
(South Africa) J Kriek (West Germany) K Meiler	6	7

Semifinals
1	(South Africa) B Hewitt (South Africa) F McMillan	6	6
(Australia) P Kronk (Australia) C Letcher	2	2
3	(Paraguay) V Pecci (Hungary) B Taróczy	7	6
(South Africa) J Kriek (West Germany) K Meiler	6	2

Final
1	(South Africa) B Hewitt (South Africa) F McMillan	3	7	4
3	(Paraguay) V Pecci (Hungary) B Taróczy	6	6	6
