= 1979 Custom Credit Australian Indoor Championships – Doubles =

Doubles
- 1979 Custom Credit Australian Indoor Championships

Final
- Champions: (Australia) Rod Frawley (Paraguay) Francisco González
- Runners-up: (India) Vijay Amritraj (United States) Pat Du Pré
- Score: Default

Events
Singles	Doubles
← 1978 ·	Custom Credit Australian Indoor Championships	· 1980 →

John Newcombe and Tony Roche were the defending champions but only Newcombe competed that year with Vitas Gerulaitis.

Gerulaitis and Newcombe lost in the first round to Rod Frawley and Francisco González.

Frawley and González won the final by default after Vijay Amritraj and Pat Du Pré withdrew.

== Seeds ==
1. (Romania) Ion Țiriac / (Argentina) Guillermo Vilas (semifinals)
2. (Australia) Ross Case / (Australia) Geoff Masters (quarterfinals)
3. (Australia) Mark Edmondson / (Australia) John Marks (first round)
4. N/A

== Draw ==
=== Key ===
- Q = Qualifier
- WC = Wild card
- LL = Lucky loser
- Alt = Alternate
- SE = Special exempt
- PR = Protected ranking
- ITF = ITF entry
- JE = Junior exempt
- w/o = Walkover
- r = Retired
- d = Defaulted
- SR = Special ranking

First round
1	(Romania) I Țiriac (Argentina) G Vilas	6	6
(Austria) P Feigl (Mexico) E Montaño	3	3
(United States) T Gorman (United States) G Hardie	3	2
(Australia) B Drewett (South Africa) C Drysdale	6	6
LL	(United States) S Denton (United States) M Turpin	5	3
(India) S Menon (United States) M Mitchell	7	6
(India) V Amritraj (United States) P Du Pré	6	3	6
(Australia) C Fancutt (Australia) K Rosewall	3	6	1
(United States) V Gerulaitis (Australia) J Newcombe	6	4
(Australia) R Frawley (Paraguay) F González	7	6
(Australia) D Collings (Australia) D Crealy	6	6
3	(Australia) M Edmondson (Australia) J Marks	1	2
(Australia) P Kronk (Australia) C Letcher	7	1	3
(Australia) J James (Australia) C Kachel	6	6	6
(Australia) S Ball (Australia) K Warwick	4	5
2	(Australia) R Case (Australia) G Masters	6	7

Quarterfinals
1	(Romania) I Țiriac (Argentina) G Vilas	2	7	7
(Australia) B Drewett (South Africa) C Drysdale	6	6	5
(India) S Menon (United States) M Mitchell	5	6	0
(India) V Amritraj (United States) P Du Pré	7	4	6
(Australia) R Frawley (Paraguay) F González	7	4	7
(Australia) D Collings (Australia) D Crealy	6	6	6
(Australia) J James (Australia) C Kachel	7	6
2	(Australia) R Case (Australia) G Masters	5	4

Semifinals
1	(Romania) I Țiriac (Argentina) G Vilas	d
(India) V Amritraj (United States) P Du Pré
(Australia) R Frawley (Paraguay) F González	7	6
(Australia) J James (Australia) C Kachel	6	3

Final
(India) V Amritraj (United States) P Du Pré	d
(Australia) R Frawley (Paraguay) F González
