= 1978 Fischer-Grand Prix – Singles =

Singles
- 1978 Fischer-Grand Prix

Final
- Champion: (United States) Stan Smith
- Runner-up: (Hungary) Balázs Taróczy
- Score: 4–6, 7–6, 7–6, 6–3

Details
- Draw: 32
- Seeds: 8

Events
Singles	Doubles
← 1977 ·	Vienna Open	· 1979 →

Brian Gottfried was the defending champion but lost in the quarterfinals to Johan Kriek.

Stan Smith won in the final 4–6, 7–6, 7–6, 6–3 against Balázs Taróczy.

== Seeds ==
1. (United States) Brian Gottfried (quarterfinals)
2. (Italy) Corrado Barazzutti (semifinals)
3. (Hungary) Balázs Taróczy (final)
4. (United States) Stan Smith (champion)
5. (South Africa) Johan Kriek (semifinals)
6. (Czechoslovakia) Tomáš Šmíd (quarterfinals)
7. (Chile) Jaime Fillol (first round)
8. (West Germany) Karl Meiler (second round)

== Draw ==
=== Key ===
- Q = Qualifier
- WC = Wild card
- LL = Lucky loser
- Alt = Alternate
- SE = Special exempt
- PR = Protected ranking
- ITF = ITF entry
- JE = Junior exempt
- w/o = Walkover
- r = Retired
- d = Defaulted
- SR = Special ranking

=== Final ===
Semifinals
5	(South Africa) Johan Kriek	1	3
3	(Hungary) Balázs Taróczy	6	6
4	(United States) Stan Smith	6	7
2	(Italy) Corrado Barazzutti	4	6

Final
3	(Hungary) Balázs Taróczy	6	6	6	3
4	(United States) Stan Smith	4	7	7	6

=== Section 1 ===
First round
1	(United States) B Gottfried	4	6	6
(Czechoslovakia) J Kodeš	6	1	4
(United Kingdom) R Taylor	3	1
(United States) T Gullikson	6	6
Q	(Czechoslovakia) P Huťka	6	6
(Austria) P Feigl	3	3
Q	(United States) F Taygan	6	5	3
5	(South Africa) J Kriek	2	7	6
3	(Hungary) B Taróczy	6	6
(Czechoslovakia) S Birner	0	2
(South Africa) B Mitton	7	3	7
Q	(Czechoslovakia) I Lendl	6	6	6
(United States) J Austin	6	6
(Australia) P Kronk	4	2
(Paraguay) V Pecci	5	3
8	(West Germany) K Meiler	7	6

Second round
1	(United States) B Gottfried	6	3	6
(United States) T Gullikson	2	6	4
Q	(Czechoslovakia) P Huťka	3	3
5	(South Africa) J Kriek	6	6
3	(Hungary) B Taróczy	6	2	7
(South Africa) B Mitton	3	6	6
(United States) J Austin	6	4	6
8	(West Germany) K Meiler	4	6	4

Quarterfinals
1	(United States) B Gottfried	2	5
5	(South Africa) J Kriek	6	7
3	(Hungary) B Taróczy	7	6
(United States) J Austin	5	3

Semifinals
5	(South Africa) J Kriek	1	3
3	(Hungary) B Taróczy	6	6

=== Section 2 ===
First round
7	(Chile) J Fillol	4	4
(Sweden) O N Bengtson	6	6
Q	(United States) J Sadri	6	6
(Austria) R Reininger	2	2
(Spain) A Muñoz	6	2	7
(France) P Proisy	3	6	6
(Austria) H Kary	3	2
4	(United States) S Smith	6	6
6	(Czechoslovakia) T Šmíd	6	6
(United States) G Hardie	1	4
(South Africa) F McMillan	6	6	6
(United Kingdom) R Lewis	3	7	2
(Australia) C Letcher	6	6
(Australia) J James	3	4
(Paraguay) F González	4	7	0
2	(Italy) C Barazzutti	6	6	6

Second round
(Sweden) O N Bengtson	3	7	6
Q	(United States) J Sadri	6	6	2
(Spain) A Muñoz	1	2
4	(United States) S Smith	6	6
6	(Czechoslovakia) T Šmíd	3	6	6
(South Africa) F McMillan	6	3	2
(Australia) C Letcher	5	5
2	(Italy) C Barazzutti	7	7

Quarterfinals
(Sweden) O N Bengtson	6	1
4	(United States) S Smith	7	6
6	(Czechoslovakia) T Šmíd	6	2	1
2	(Italy) C Barazzutti	2	6	6

Semifinals
4	(United States) S Smith	6	7
2	(Italy) C Barazzutti	4	6
