= 1980 Custom Credit Australian Indoor Championships =

- Date: 13–19 October
- Edition: 8th
- Category: Grand Prix
- Draw: 32S / 16D
- Prize money: $175,000
- Surface: Hard / indoor
- Location: Sydney, Australia
- Venue: Hordern Pavilion

Champions

Singles
- (United States) John McEnroe

Doubles
- (United States) Peter Fleming / (United States) John McEnroe
- Australian Indoor Tennis Championships

The 1980 Custom Credit Australian Indoor Championships was a tennis tournament played on indoor hard courts at the Hordern Pavilion in Sydney, Australia and was part of the 1980 Volvo Grand Prix. It was the 8th edition of the tournament and was held from 13 October through 19 October 1980. First-seeded John McEnroe won the singles title and earned $46,250 first-prize money.

== Finals ==
=== Singles ===
(United States) John McEnroe defeated (United States) Vitas Gerulaitis 6–3, 6–4, 7–5

- It was McEnroe's 6th singles title of the year and the 21st of his career.

=== Doubles ===
(United States) Peter Fleming / (United States) John McEnroe defeated (United States) Tim Gullikson / (South Africa) Johan Kriek 4–6, 6–1, 6–2

- It was Fleming's 6th title of the year and the 30th of his career. It was McEnroe's 12th title of the year and the 49th of his career.
