= 1980 Custom Credit Australian Indoor Championships – Singles =

Singles
- 1980 Custom Credit Australian Indoor Championships

Final
- Champion: (United States) John McEnroe
- Runner-up: (United States) Vitas Gerulaitis
- Score: 6–3, 6–4

Details
- Draw: 32
- Seeds: 8

Events
Singles	Doubles
← 1979 ·	Australian Indoor Tennis Championships	· 1981 →

Vitas Gerulaitis was the defending champion but lost in the final 6–3, 6–4 to John McEnroe.

== Seeds ==
1. (United States) John McEnroe (champion)
2. (United States) Gene Mayer (semifinals)
3. (United States) Vitas Gerulaitis (final)
4. (Poland) Wojciech Fibak (first round)
5. (United States) John Sadri (quarterfinals)
6. (South Africa) Johan Kriek (semifinals)
7. (United States) Bill Scanlon (quarterfinals)
8. (Australia) Phil Dent (second round)

== Draw ==
=== Key ===
- Q = Qualifier
- WC = Wild card
- LL = Lucky loser
- Alt = Alternate
- SE = Special exempt
- PR = Protected ranking
- ITF = ITF entry
- JE = Junior exempt
- w/o = Walkover
- r = Retired
- d = Defaulted
- SR = Special ranking

=== Finals ===
Semifinals
1	(United States) John McEnroe	6	6
6	(South Africa) Johan Kriek	4	4
3	(United States) Vitas Gerulaitis	6	6
2	(United States) Gene Mayer	4	3

Final
1	(United States) John McEnroe	6	6
3	(United States) Vitas Gerulaitis	3	4

=== Top half ===
First round
1	(United States) J McEnroe	6	6
(United States) S Mayer	3	3
(Australia) R Frawley	6	6
(United States) V Van Patten	1	2
(United States) T Gullikson	2	6	6
(Australia) K Warwick	6	3	4
(United States) T Gorman	3	6	4
8	(Australia) P Dent	6	4	6
4	(Poland) W Fibak	6	4	6
(Austria) P Feigl	1	6	7
(United States) B Walts	6	6
(United States) P Fleming	4	3
(Australia) P McNamara	6	6
(Australia) M Edmondson	3	2
(Australia) J Alexander	2	5
6	(South Africa) J Kriek	6	7

Second round
1	(United States) J McEnroe	6	6
(Australia) R Frawley	1	2
(United States) T Gullikson	6	7
8	(Australia) P Dent	4	5
(Austria) P Feigl	6	7
(United States) B Walts	3	6
(Australia) P McNamara	3	7	2
6	(South Africa) J Kriek	6	6	6

Quarterfinals
1	(United States) J McEnroe	6	6
(United States) T Gullikson	2	4
(Austria) P Feigl	3	6	6
6	(South Africa) J Kriek	6	3	7

Semifinals
1	(United States) J McEnroe	6	6
6	(South Africa) J Kriek	4	4

=== Bottom half ===
First round
7	(United States) B Scanlon	6	6	6
Q	(United States) F Buehning	7	4	3
Q	(Australia) C Johnstone	6	6
(Australia) G Masters	2	1
(United States) F Taygan	3	6	6
(United States) C Delaney	6	2	2
(Australia) P McNamee	2	2
3	(United States) V Gerulaitis	6	6
5	(United States) J Sadri	6	6
(Paraguay) F González	1	3
(Australia) K Rosewall	6	7
(United States) T Wilkison	4	5
(Australia) T Roche	6	7
(Australia) J Newcombe	4	6
(United States) P Du Pré	3	7	2
2	(United States) G Mayer	6	6	6

Second round
7	(United States) B Scanlon	6	6
Q	(Australia) C Johnstone	1	2
(United States) F Taygan	4	0
3	(United States) V Gerulaitis	6	6
5	(United States) J Sadri	7	3	6
(Australia) K Rosewall	5	6	3
(Australia) T Roche	3	0
2	(United States) G Mayer	6	6

Quarterfinals
7	(United States) B Scanlon	3	3
3	(United States) V Gerulaitis	6	6
5	(United States) J Sadri	6	4
2	(United States) G Mayer	7	6

Semifinals
3	(United States) V Gerulaitis	6	6
2	(United States) G Mayer	4	3
