= 1980 Fischer-Grand Prix =

- Date: 20–26 October
- Edition: 6th
- Category: Grand Prix
- Draw: 48S / 16D
- Prize money: $100,000
- Surface: Hard / indoor
- Location: Vienna, Austria
- Venue: Wiener Stadthalle

Champions

Singles
- (United States) Brian Gottfried

Doubles
- (United States) Robert Lutz / (United States) Stan Smith
- Vienna Open

The 1980 Fischer-Grand Prix was a men's tennis tournament played on indoor hard courts at the Wiener Stadthalle in Vienna, Austria that was part of the 1980 Volvo Grand Prix. It was the sixth edition of the tournament and was held from 20 October until 26 October 1980. First-seeded Brian Gottfried won the singles title, his second at the event after 1977.

== Finals ==
=== Singles ===
(United States) Brian Gottfried defeated (United States) Trey Waltke 6–2, 6–4, 6–3

- It was Gottfried's 8th title of the year and the 66th of his career.

=== Doubles ===
(United States) Robert Lutz / (United States) Stan Smith defeated (Switzerland) Heinz Günthardt / (Czechoslovakia) Pavel Složil 6–1, 6–2

- It was Lutz's 7th title of the year and the 49th of his career. It was Smith's 6th title of the year and the 86th of his career.
