= 1982 Fischer-Grand Prix – Singles =

Singles
- 1982 Fischer-Grand Prix

Final
- Champion: (United States) Brian Gottfried
- Runner-up: (United States) Bill Scanlon
- Score: 6–1, 6–4, 6–0

Details
- Draw: 32
- Seeds: 8

Events
Singles	Doubles
← 1981 ·	Vienna Open	· 1983 →

Ivan Lendl was the defending champion but did not compete that year.

Brian Gottfried won in the final 6–1, 6–4, 6–0 against Bill Scanlon.

== Seeds ==
1. (United States) Brian Gottfried (champion)
2. (United States) Mark Dickson (second round)
3. (Paraguay) Víctor Pecci (second round)
4. (Brazil) Marcos Hocevar (quarterfinals)
5. (Czechoslovakia) Pavel Složil (first round)
6. (West Germany) Peter Elter (second round)
7. (France) Henri Leconte (semifinals)
8. (United States) Bill Scanlon (final)

== Draw ==
=== Key ===
- Q = Qualifier
- WC = Wild card
- LL = Lucky loser
- Alt = Alternate
- SE = Special exempt
- PR = Protected ranking
- ITF = ITF entry
- JE = Junior exempt
- w/o = Walkover
- r = Retired
- d = Defaulted
- SR = Special ranking

=== Final ===
Semifinals
1	(United States) Brian Gottfried	6	6	6
7	(France) Henri Leconte	2	7	4
8	(United States) Bill Scanlon	3	7	7
Q	(United States) Mike De Palmer	6	6	6

Final
1	(United States) Brian Gottfried	6	6	6
8	(United States) Bill Scanlon	1	4	0

=== Section 1 ===
First round
1	(United States) B Gottfried	6	6
(Austria) P Feigl	1	2
(Italy) A Panatta	7	6
(Sweden) P Hjertquist	6	4
(Italy) C Barazzutti	6	6
(United States) N Saviano	4	4
Q	(Austria) B Pils	7	6	1
6	(West Germany) P Elter	6	7	6
4	(Brazil) M Hocevar	6	6
(Austria) H Kary	4	4
(Czechoslovakia) S Birner	6	4	5
(United States) M Doyle	4	6	7
(India) R Krishnan	6	6
(United Kingdom) R Lewis	4	4
(United States) J Lapidus	4	6
7	(France) H Leconte	6	7

Second round
1	(United States) B Gottfried	6	6
(Italy) A Panatta	1	4
(Italy) C Barazzutti	7	6
6	(West Germany) P Elter	5	1
4	(Brazil) M Hocevar	7	6
(United States) M Doyle	5	4
(India) R Krishnan	d
7	(France) H Leconte

Quarterfinals
1	(United States) B Gottfried	6	6
(Italy) C Barazzutti	3	1
4	(Brazil) M Hocevar	5	3
7	(France) H Leconte	7	6

Semifinals
1	(United States) B Gottfried	6	6	6
7	(France) H Leconte	2	7	4

=== Section 2 ===
First round
8	(United States) B Scanlon	6	6
Q	(United States) C Dunk	3	2
(Romania) I Năstase	6	6
(Nigeria) N Odizor	3	2
(United States) S Smith	6	6
(United States) E Iskersky	2	3
(West Germany) K Meiler	6	1
3	(Paraguay) V Pecci	7	6
5	(Czechoslovakia) P Složil	6	6	2
(Brazil) J Soares	3	7	6
(Italy) G Rinaldini	6	3	5
(United States) T Moor	2	6	7
Q	(United States) M De Palmer	2	7	7
(South Africa) D Visser	6	6	6
(Zimbabwe) H Ismail	3	0^{r}
2	(United States) M Dickson	6	1

Second round
8	(United States) B Scanlon	1	6	6
(Romania) I Năstase	6	3	4
(United States) S Smith	6	7
3	(Paraguay) V Pecci	3	6
(Brazil) J Soares	6	7
(United States) T Moor	4	5
Q	(United States) M De Palmer	7	2	6
2	(United States) M Dickson	6	6	2

Quarterfinals
8	(United States) B Scanlon	2	7	7
(United States) S Smith	6	6	5
(Brazil) J Soares	6	6	1
Q	(United States) M De Palmer	3	7	6

Semifinals
8	(United States) B Scanlon	3	7	7
Q	(United States) M De Palmer	6	6	6
