= 1982 Fischer-Grand Prix =

- Date: 18–24 October
- Edition: 8th
- Category: Grand Prix
- Draw: 32S / 16D
- Prize money: $100,000
- Surface: Hard / indoor
- Location: Vienna, Austria
- Venue: Wiener Stadthalle

Champions

Singles
- (United States) Brian Gottfried

Doubles
- (France) Henri Leconte / (Czechoslovakia) Pavel Složil
- Vienna Open

The 1982 Fischer-Grand Prix was a men's tennis tournament played on indoor hard courts at the Wiener Stadthalle in Vienna, Austria that was part of the 1982 Volvo Grand Prix. It was the eighth edition of the tournament and was held from 18 October until 24 October 1982. First-seeded Brian Gottfried won the singles title, his third at the event after 1977 and 1980.

== Finals ==
=== Singles ===
(United States) Brian Gottfried defeated (United States) Bill Scanlon 6–1, 6–4, 6–0

- It was Gottfried's 2nd singles title of the year and the 24th of his career.

=== Doubles ===
(France) Henri Leconte / (Czechoslovakia) Pavel Složil defeated (United States) Mark Dickson / (United States) Terry Moor 6–1, 7–6

- It was Leconte's 3rd title of the year and the 4th of his career. It was Složil's 8th title of the year and the 11th of his career.
