= 1981 Cuore Cup =

- Date: 23–29 March
- Edition: 4th
- Category: Grand Prix (WCT)
- Draw: 32S / 16D
- Prize money: $175,000
- Surface: Carpet / indoor
- Location: Milan, Italy
- Venue: Palazzo dello Sport

Champions

Singles
- (United States) John McEnroe

Doubles
- (United States) Brian Gottfried / (Mexico) Raúl Ramirez
- Milan Indoor

The 1981 Cuore Cup was a men's tennis tournament played on indoor carpet courts at the Palazzo dello Sport in Milan, Italy. The event was part WCT Tour which was incorporated into the 1981 Volvo Grand Prix circuit. It was the fourth edition of the tournament and was held from 23 March through 29 March 1981. Second-seeded John McEnroe won his third consecutive singles title at the event and earned $35,000 first-prize money.

== Finals ==
=== Singles ===
(United States) John McEnroe defeated (Sweden) Björn Borg 7–6^{(7–2)}, 6–4

- It was McEnroe's 2nd singles title of the year and the 26th of his career.

=== Doubles ===
(United States) Brian Gottfried / (Mexico) Raúl Ramirez defeated (United States) John McEnroe / (United States) Peter Rennert 7–6, 6–3

== See also ==
- Borg–McEnroe rivalry
