= 1978 Fischer-Grand Prix =

- Date: 23–29 October
- Edition: 4th
- Category: Grand Prix
- Draw: 32S / 16D
- Prize money: $75,000
- Surface: Hard / indoor
- Location: Vienna, Austria
- Venue: Wiener Stadthalle

Champions

Singles
- (United States) Stan Smith

Doubles
- (Paraguay) Víctor Pecci / (Hungary) Balázs Taróczy
- Vienna Open

The 1978 Fischer-Grand Prix was a men's tennis tournament played on indoor hard courts at the Wiener Stadthalle in Vienna, Austria that was part of the 1978 Colgate-Palmolive Grand Prix. It was the fourth edition of the tournament and was held from 23 October until 29 October 1978. Fourth-seeded Stan Smith won the singles title.

== Finals ==
=== Singles ===
(United States) Stan Smith defeated (Hungary) Balázs Taróczy 4–6, 7–6, 7–6, 6–3

- It was Smith's 5th title of the year and the 72nd of his career.

=== Doubles ===
(Paraguay) Víctor Pecci / (Hungary) Balázs Taróczy defeated (South Africa) Bob Hewitt / (South Africa) Frew McMillan 6–3, 6–7, 6–4

- It was Pecci's 5th title of the year and the 8th of his career. It was Taróczy's 5th title of the year and the 8th of his career.
