= 1979 Custom Credit Australian Indoor Championships – Singles =

Singles
- 1979 Custom Credit Australian Indoor Championships

Final
- Champion: (United States) Vitas Gerulaitis
- Runner-up: (Argentina) Guillermo Vilas
- Score: 4–6, 6–3, 6–1, 7–6

Details
- Draw: 32
- Seeds: 8

Events
Singles	Doubles
← 1978 ·	Australian Indoor Tennis Championships	· 1980 →

Jimmy Connors was the defending champion but did not compete that year.

Vitas Gerulaitis won in the final 4–6, 6–3, 6–1, 7–6 against Guillermo Vilas.

== Seeds ==
1. (United States) Vitas Gerulaitis (champion)
2. (Argentina) Guillermo Vilas (final)
3. (United States) Pat Du Pré (first round)
4. n/a
5. (India) Vijay Amritraj (second round)
6. (Austria) Peter Feigl (quarterfinals)
7. (Australia) Geoff Masters (second round)
8. (United States) Tom Gorman (second round)

== Draw ==
=== Key ===
- Q = Qualifier
- WC = Wild card
- LL = Lucky loser
- Alt = Alternate
- SE = Special exempt
- PR = Protected ranking
- ITF = ITF entry
- JE = Junior exempt
- w/o = Walkover
- r = Retired
- d = Defaulted
- SR = Special ranking

Semifinals
1	(United States) Vitas Gerulaitis	6	7
(Paraguay) Francisco González	1	5
(Australia) Kim Warwick	4	6	1
2	(Argentina) Guillermo Vilas	6	3	6

Final
1	(United States) Vitas Gerulaitis	4	6	6
2	(Argentina) Guillermo Vilas	6	3	1

=== Section 1 ===
First round
1	(United States) V Gerulaitis	4	6	7
(Australia) M Edmondson	6	2	5
Q	(Australia) A Gardiner	4	2
(Australia) T Rocavert	6	6
(Australia) J Newcombe	6	6
(Australia) R Case	3	1
(India) S Menon	3	5
5	(India) V Amritraj	6	7
LL	(Australia) C Fancutt	3	1
(Australia) A Stone	6	6
(Paraguay) F González	7	2	6
(Australia) R Frawley	5	6	3
(Australia) D Collings	6	4	7
(Australia) K Rosewall	2	6	6
(Australia) B Drewett	3	6	1
7	(Australia) G Masters	6	3	6

Second round
1	(United States) V Gerulaitis	6	6
(Australia) T Rocavert	1	2
(Australia) J Newcombe	6	6
5	(India) V Amritraj	4	4
(Australia) A Stone	3	5
(Paraguay) F González	6	7
(Australia) D Collings	7	5	6
7	(Australia) G Masters	6	7	2

Quarterfinals
1	(United States) V Gerulaitis	6	6
(Australia) J Newcombe	1	3
(Paraguay) F González	6	6
(Australia) D Collings	1	4

Semifinals
1	(United States) V Gerulaitis	6	7
(Paraguay) F González	1	5

=== Section 2 ===
First round
8	(United States) T Gorman	7	3	6
(Australia) C Kachel	5	6	3
(Australia) J James	1	3
(Australia) K Warwick	6	6
(Australia) P Dent	6	3	6
(Australia) P Kronk	2	6	3
(United States) M Mitchell	6	6	6
3	(United States) P Du Pré	7	2	2
6	(Austria) P Feigl	6	6
(United States) G Hardie	3	3
(Mexico) E Montaño	6	6
(Australia) J Marks	4	3
Q	(Australia) D Crealy	4	3
(South Africa) C Drysdale	6	6
(Australia) C Letcher	4	2
2	(Argentina) G Vilas	6	6

Second round
8	(United States) T Gorman	6	2
(Australia) K Warwick	7	6
(Australia) P Dent	6	6
(United States) M Mitchell	3	2
6	(Austria) P Feigl	7	6
(Mexico) E Montaño	5	3
(South Africa) C Drysdale	2	4
2	(Argentina) G Vilas	6	6

Quarterfinals
(Australia) K Warwick	6	4	6
(Australia) P Dent	3	6	0
6	(Austria) P Feigl	6	5
2	(Argentina) G Vilas	7	7

Semifinals
(Australia) K Warwick	4	6	1
2	(Argentina) G Vilas	6	3	6
