= 1982 Fischer-Grand Prix – Doubles =

Doubles
- 1982 Fischer-Grand Prix

Final
- Champions: (France) Henri Leconte (Czechoslovakia) Pavel Složil
- Runners-up: (United States) Mark Dickson (United States) Terry Moor
- Score: 6–1, 7–6

Details
- Draw: 16
- Seeds: 4

Events
Singles	Doubles
← 1981 ·	Vienna Open	· 1983 →

Steve Denton and Tim Wilkison were the defending champions but did not compete that year.

Henri Leconte and Pavel Složil won in the final 6–1, 7–6 against Mark Dickson and Terry Moor.

== Seeds ==
1. (United States) Brian Gottfried / (South Africa) Frew McMillan (quarterfinals)
2. (France) Henri Leconte / (Czechoslovakia) Pavel Složil (champions)
3. (South Africa) Bernard Mitton / (South Africa) Danie Visser (quarterfinals)
4. (Romania) Ilie Năstase / (Italy) Adriano Panatta (first round)

== Draw ==
=== Key ===
- Q = Qualifier
- WC = Wild card
- LL = Lucky loser
- Alt = Alternate
- SE = Special exempt
- PR = Protected ranking
- ITF = ITF entry
- JE = Junior exempt
- w/o = Walkover
- r = Retired
- d = Defaulted
- SR = Special ranking

First round
1	(United States) B Gottfried (South Africa) F McMillan	6	7
(Nigeria) N Odizor (United States) N Saviano	3	6
(United States) M Dickson (United States) T Moor	7	7
(Austria) G Mild (Austria) B Pils	5	6
4	(Romania) I Năstase (Italy) A Panatta	7	6	3
(United Kingdom) R Lewis (United Kingdom) J Smith	6	7	6
(Czechoslovakia) J Granát (United States) E Iskersky	7	7
(Sweden) P Hjertquist (Czechoslovakia) J Navrátil	6	5
(Brazil) M Hocevar (Brazil) J Soares	6	6
(United States) M Doyle (United States) J Lapidus	1	1
(Czechoslovakia) J Kodeš (West Germany) K Meiler	3	4
3	(South Africa) B Mitton (South Africa) D Visser	6	6
(United States) C Dunk (United States) S Smith	6	7
(Czechoslovakia) S Birner (United Kingdom) J Feaver	2	6
(Austria) H Kary (Italy) G Rinaldini	4	4
2	(France) H Leconte (Czechoslovakia) P Složil	6	6

Quarterfinals
1	(United States) B Gottfried (South Africa) F McMillan	1	4
(United States) M Dickson (United States) T Moor	6	6
(United Kingdom) R Lewis (United Kingdom) J Smith	7	6
(Czechoslovakia) J Granát (United States) E Iskersky	5	4
(Brazil) M Hocevar (Brazil) J Soares	6	6
3	(South Africa) B Mitton (South Africa) D Visser	2	2
(United States) C Dunk (United States) S Smith	7	2	2
2	(France) H Leconte (Czechoslovakia) P Složil	5	6	6

Semifinals
(United States) M Dickson (United States) T Moor	5	6	6
(United Kingdom) R Lewis (United Kingdom) J Smith	7	2	2
(Brazil) M Hocevar (Brazil) J Soares	4	3
2	(France) H Leconte (Czechoslovakia) P Složil	6	6

Final
(United States) M Dickson (United States) T Moor	1	6
2	(France) H Leconte (Czechoslovakia) P Složil	6	7
