= 1979 Custom Credit Australian Indoor Championships =

- Date: 15–21 October
- Edition: 7th
- Category: Grand Prix circuit (Four star)
- Draw: 32S / 16D
- Prize money: $175,000
- Location: Sydney, Australia
- Venue: Hordern Pavilion

Champions

Singles
- (United States) Vitas Gerulaitis

Doubles
- (Australia) Rod Frawley / (Paraguay) Francisco González
- Australian Indoor Tennis Championships

The 1979 Custom Credit Australian Indoor Championships was a men's tennis tournament played on indoor hard courts at the Hordern Pavilion in Sydney, Australia and was part of the 1979 Colgate-Palmolive Grand Prix. It was the seventh edition of the tournament and was held from 15 October through 21 October 1979. First-seeded Vitas Gerulaitis won the singles title.

== Finals ==
=== Singles ===
(United States) Vitas Gerulaitis defeated (Argentina) Guillermo Vilas 4–6, 6–3, 6–1, 7–6

- It was Gerulaitis' 3rd title of the year and the 22nd of his career.

=== Doubles ===
(Australia) Rod Frawley / (Paraguay) Francisco González defeated (India) Vijay Amritraj / (United States) Pat Du Pré by default

- It was Frawley's only title of the year and the 1st of his career. It was González's 2nd title of the year and the 2nd of his career.
