= 1981 Fischer-Grand Prix =

- Date: 19–25 October
- Edition: 7th
- Category: Grand Prix
- Draw: 48S / 24D
- Prize money: $100,000
- Surface: Hard / indoor
- Location: Vienna, Austria
- Venue: Wiener Stadthalle

Champions

Singles
- (Czechoslovakia) Ivan Lendl

Doubles
- (United States) Steve Denton / (United States) Tim Wilkison
- Vienna Open

The 1981 Fischer-Grand Prix was a men's tennis tournament played on indoor hard courts at the Wiener Stadthalle in Vienna in Austria that was part of the 1981 Volvo Grand Prix. It was the seventh edition of the tournament and was held from 19 October until 25 October 1981. First-seeded Ivan Lendl won the singles title.

== Finals ==
=== Singles ===
(Czechoslovakia) Ivan Lendl defeated (United States) Brian Gottfried 1–6, 6–0, 6–1, 6–2

- It was Lendl's 7th singles title of the year and the 14th of his career.

=== Doubles ===
(United States) Steve Denton / (United States) Tim Wilkison defeated (United States) Sammy Giammalva Jr. / (United States) Fred McNair 4–6, 6–3, 6–4

- It was Denton's 3rd title of the year and the 7th of his career. It was Wilkison's 2nd title of the year and the 5th of his career.
