= 1979 Fischer-Grand Prix – Doubles =

Doubles
- 1979 Fischer-Grand Prix

Final
- Champions: (South Africa) Bob Hewitt (South Africa) Frew McMillan
- Runners-up: (United States) Brian Gottfried (Mexico) Raúl Ramírez
- Score: 6–4, 3–6, 6–1

Details
- Draw: 24
- Seeds: 8

Events
| Singles | Doubles |
- Vienna Open

Víctor Pecci and Balázs Taróczy were the defending champions but did not compete that year.

Bob Hewitt and Frew McMillan won in the final 6–4, 3–6, 6–1 against Brian Gottfried and Raúl Ramírez.

== Seeds ==
The draw allocated unseeded teams at random; as a result two seeded teams received byes into the second round.

1. (Poland) Wojciech Fibak / (Netherlands) Tom Okker (quarterfinals)
2. (United States) Gene Mayer / (United States) Stan Smith (semifinals)
3. (United States) Brian Gottfried / (Mexico) Raúl Ramírez (final)
4. (South Africa) Bob Hewitt / (South Africa) Frew McMillan (champions)
5. (Switzerland) Heinz Günthardt / (Czechoslovakia) Pavel Složil (semifinals)
6. (United States) Tom Gullikson / (United States) Bruce Manson (first round)
7. (Chile) Álvaro Fillol / (Chile) Jaime Fillol (quarterfinals)
8. (South Africa) Johan Kriek / (United States) Eliot Teltscher (second round)

== Draw ==
Key

- Q = Qualifier
- WC = Wild card
- LL = Lucky loser
- Alt = Alternate
- ITF = ITF entry
- PR = Protected ranking
- SR = Special ranking
- SE = Special exempt
- JE = Junior exempt
- JR = Junior Accelerator Programme entrant
- CO = College Accelerator Programme entrant
- NG = Next Gen Accelerator Program entrant
- w/o = Walkover
- r = Retired
- d = Defaulted

=== Final ===
Semifinals
5 | (Switzerland) Heinz Günthardt (Czechoslovakia) Pavel Složil | 3 | 2
4 | (South Africa) Bob Hewitt (South Africa) Frew McMillan | 6 | 6
3 | (United States) Brian Gottfried (Mexico) Raúl Ramírez | 3 | 6 | 6
2 | (United States) Gene Mayer (United States) Stan Smith | 6 | 3 | 3

Final
4 | (South Africa) Bob Hewitt (South Africa) Frew McMillan | 6 | 3 | 6
3 | (United States) Brian Gottfried (Mexico) Raúl Ramírez | 4 | 6 | 1

=== Top half ===
First round
1 | (Poland) W Fibak (Netherlands) T Okker | 6 | 6
(United States) N Saviano (United States) F Taygan | 4 | 4
(Austria) H Kary (United States) T Waltke | 3 | 6
5 | (Switzerland) H Günthardt (Czechoslovakia) P Složil | 6 | 7
4 | (South Africa) B Hewitt (South Africa) F McMillan | 6 | 6
(Australia) E Ewert (United Kingdom) R Lewis | 4 | 3
(Czechoslovakia) S Birner (Czechoslovakia) J Šimbera | 4 | 4
8 | (South Africa) J Kriek (United States) E Teltscher | 6 | 6

Second round
1 | (Poland) W Fibak (Netherlands) T Okker | 4 | 7 | 6
(South Africa) R Moore (South Africa) D Schneider | 6 | 5 | 2
(Socialist Federal Republic of Yugoslavia) Ž Franulović (Czechoslovakia) I Lendl | 4 | 6
5 | (Switzerland) H Günthardt (Czechoslovakia) P Složil | 6 | 7
4 | (South Africa) B Hewitt (South Africa) F McMillan | 6 | 6
(Austria) G Wimmer (Austria) I Wimmer | 3 | 1
(South Africa) K Curren (Finland) L Palin | 6 | 6
8 | (South Africa) J Kriek (United States) E Teltscher | 4 | 4

Quarterfinals
1 | (Poland) W Fibak (Netherlands) T Okker | 2 | 6 | 4
5 | (Switzerland) H Günthardt (Czechoslovakia) P Složil | 6 | 3 | 6
4 | (South Africa) B Hewitt (South Africa) F McMillan | 5 | 6 | 6
(South Africa) K Curren (Finland) L Palin | 7 | 4 | 4

Semifinals
5 | (Switzerland) H Günthardt (Czechoslovakia) P Složil | 3 | 2
4 | (South Africa) B Hewitt (South Africa) F McMillan | 6 | 6

=== Bottom half ===
First round
6 | (United States) T Gullikson (United States) B Manson | 6 | 6 | 1
(Switzerland) M Günthardt (Netherlands) L Sanders | 3 | 7 | 6
(United States) G Erickson (Sweden) T Svensson | 4 | 3
(United States) E Fromm (United States) J Hayes | 6 | 6
(Austria) R Reininger (Austria) R Stiegler | 3 | 3
(France) C Freyss (Brazil) T Koch | 6 | 6
(France) J-L Haillet (France) P Portes | 6 | 2 | 3
2 | (United States) G Mayer (United States) S Smith | 4 | 6 | 6

Second round
(Switzerland) M Günthardt (Netherlands) L Sanders | 3 | 6 | 7
(Australia) S Docherty (United States) K Richardson | 6 | 3 | 6
(United States) E Fromm (United States) J Hayes | 2 | 4
3 | (United States) B Gottfried (Mexico) R Ramírez | 6 | 6
7 | (Chile) A Fillol (Chile) J Fillol | 6 | 6
(France) C Freyss (Brazil) T Koch | 1 | 4
(United States) G Malin (United States) V Van Patten | 6 | 2 | 3
2 | (United States) G Mayer (United States) S Smith | 4 | 6 | 6

Quarterfinals
(Switzerland) M Günthardt (Netherlands) L Sanders | 4 | 4
3 | (United States) B Gottfried (Mexico) R Ramírez | 6 | 6
7 | (Chile) A Fillol (Chile) J Fillol | 2 | 1
2 | (United States) G Mayer (United States) S Smith | 6 | 6

Semifinals
3 | (United States) B Gottfried (Mexico) R Ramírez | 3 | 6 | 6
2 | (United States) G Mayer (United States) S Smith | 6 | 3 | 3
