= 1981 Custom Credit Australian Indoor Championships =

- Date: 12–18 October
- Edition: 9th
- Draw: 32S / 16D
- Prize money: $175,000
- Surface: Hard / indoor
- Location: Sydney, Australia
- Venue: Hordern Pavilion

Champions

Singles
- (United States) John McEnroe

Doubles
- (United States) Peter Fleming / (United States) John McEnroe
- Australian Indoor Tennis Championships

The 1981 Custom Credit Australian Indoor Championships was a men's tennis tournament played on indoor hard courts at the Hordern Pavilion in Sydney in Australia and was part of the 1981 Volvo Grand Prix. It was the ninth edition of the tournament and was held from 12 October through 18 October 1981. Top-seeded John McEnroe won his second successive singles title at the event.

== Finals ==
=== Singles ===
(United States) John McEnroe defeated (United States) Roscoe Tanner 6–4, 7–5, 6–2

- It was McEnroe's 10th singles title of the year and the 34th of his career.

=== Doubles ===
(United States) Peter Fleming / (United States) John McEnroe defeated (United States) Sherwood Stewart / (United States) Ferdi Taygan 6–7, 7–6, 6–1

- It was Fleming's 7th title of the year and the 39th of his career. It was McEnroe's 16th title of the year and the 72nd of his career.
