= 1980 Custom Credit Australian Indoor Championships – Doubles =

Doubles
- 1980 Custom Credit Australian Indoor Championships

Final
- Champions: (United States) Peter Fleming (United States) John McEnroe
- Runners-up: (United States) Tim Gullikson (South Africa) Johan Kriek
- Score: 4–6, 6–1, 6–2

Details
- Draw: 16
- Seeds: 4

Events
Singles	Doubles
- Custom Credit Australian Indoor Championships

Rod Frawley and Francisco González were the defending champions but they lost in the first round to Peter McNamara and Paul McNamee.

Peter Fleming and John McEnroe won in the final 4–6, 6–1, 6–2 against Tim Gullikson and Johan Kriek.

== Seeds ==
1. (United States) Peter Fleming / (United States) John McEnroe (champions)
2. (United States) Gene Mayer / (United States) Sandy Mayer (semifinals)
3. (Australia) Peter McNamara / (Australia) Paul McNamee (quarterfinals)
4. (United States) Tom Gullikson / (United States) Butch Walts (quarterfinals)

== Draw ==
Key

- Q = Qualifier
- WC = Wild card
- LL = Lucky loser
- Alt = Alternate
- ITF = ITF entry
- PR = Protected ranking
- SR = Special ranking
- SE = Special exempt
- JE = Junior exempt
- JR = Junior Accelerator Programme entrant
- CO = College Accelerator Programme entrant
- NG = Next Gen Accelerator Program entrant
- w/o = Walkover
- r = Retired
- d = Defaulted

First round
1	(United States) P Fleming (United States) J McEnroe	6	6
(Australia) P Dent (Australia) G Masters	3	2
(United States) V Gerulaitis (United States) R Meyer	6	6
(Australia) M Edmondson (Australia) K Warwick	4	4
4	(United States) To Gullikison (United States) B Walts	6	6
(Australia) D Collings (Australia) D Crealy	3	4
(United States) F Buehning (United States) F Taygan	7	6	6
(Australia) S Ball (Australia) T Rocavert	6	7	2
(United States) Ti Gullikison (South Africa) J Kriek	3	6	6
(Australia) C Kachel (Australia) J Marks	6	3	1
(Australia) R Frawley (Paraguay) F González	3	2
3	(Australia) P McNamara (Australia) P McNamee	6	6
(United States) P Du Pré (Austria) P Feigl	6	6
(United States) J Sadri (United States) T Wilkison	2	1
(Australia) J Newcombe (Australia) T Roche	6	2	3
2	(United States) G Mayer (United States) S Mayer	4	6	6

Quarterfinals
1	(United States) P Fleming (United States) J McEnroe	6	6
(United States) V Gerulaitis (United States) R Meyer	2	3
4	(United States) To Gullikison (United States) B Walts	6	3
(United States) F Buehning (United States) F Taygan	7	6
(United States) Ti Gullikison (South Africa) J Kriek	6	7
3	(Australia) P McNamara (Australia) P McNamee	4	6
(United States) P Du Pré (Austria) P Feigl	5	3
2	(United States) G Mayer (United States) S Mayer	7	6

Semifinals
1	(United States) P Fleming (United States) J McEnroe	6	6
(United States) F Buehning (United States) F Taygan	4	3
(United States) Ti Gullikison (South Africa) J Kriek	7	6
2	(United States) G Mayer (United States) S Mayer	5	1

Final
1	(United States) P Fleming (United States) J McEnroe	4	6	6
(United States) Ti Gullikison (South Africa) J Kriek	6	1	2
