= Jiří Průcha =

Czech tennis player (born 1955)

- Country (sports): Czechoslovakia
- Born: 10 August 1955 (age 69); Prague, Czechoslovakia

Singles
- Career record: 3–9
- Highest ranking: No. 298 (16 January 1978)

Doubles
- Career record: 1–8
- Highest ranking: No. 387 (3 January 1983)

Jiří Průcha (born 10 August 1955) is a Czech former professional tennis player.

Born in Prague, Průcha was based in West Germany during his career and had a best singles ranking of 298 in the world. At the Stuttgart Grand Prix tournament in 1978 he had a 6–0, 6–1 first round win over Jan Kodeš. Another of his best wins was against Patrick Proisy at Hamburg in 1979.
