= Raúl Ramírez =

Mexican tennis player

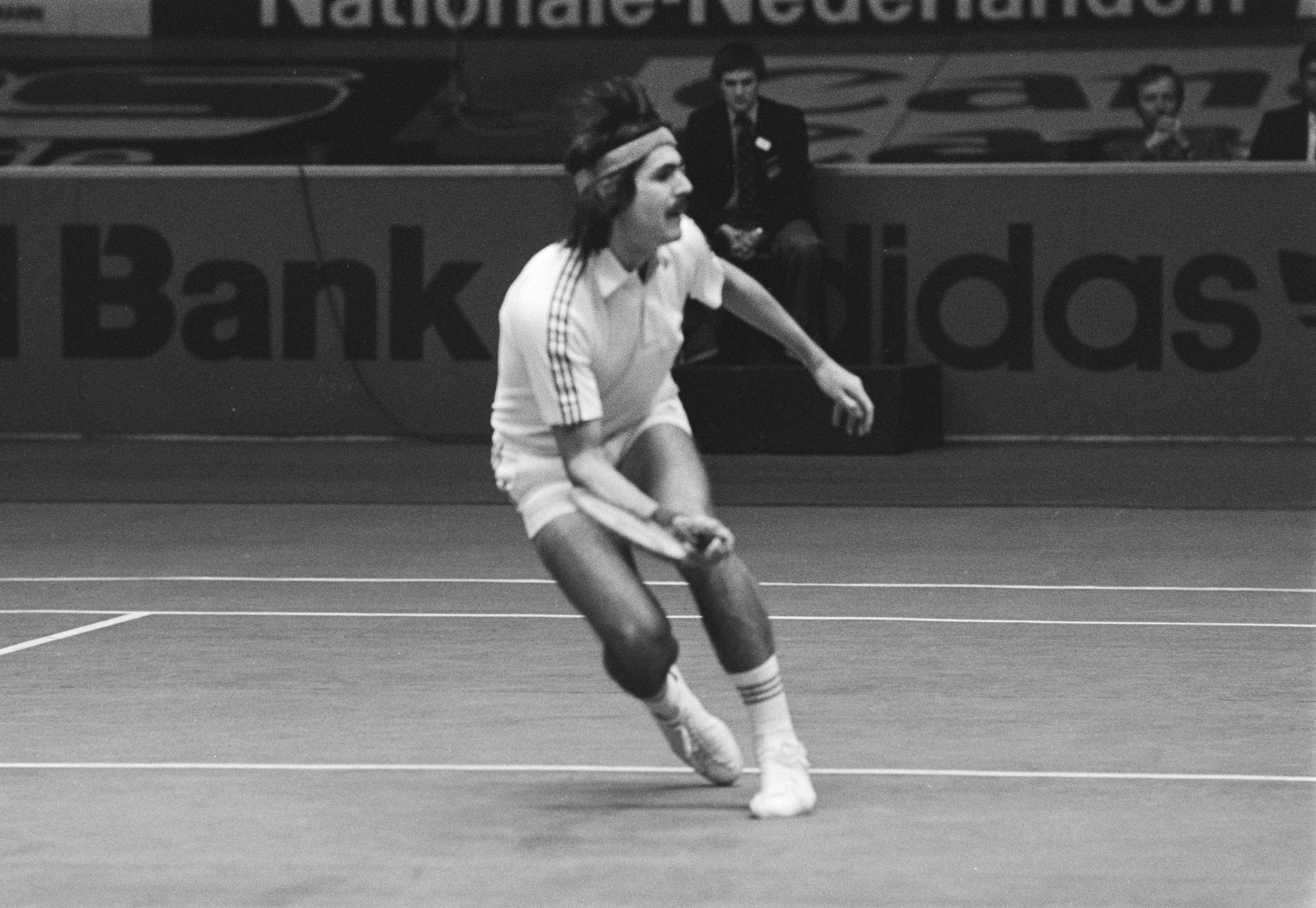
- Full name: Raúl Carlos Ramírez
- Country (sports): Mexico
- Residence: Ensenada, Baja California, Mexico
- Born: 20 June 1953 (age 73) Ensenada, Baja California, Mexico
- Height: 1.82 m (6 ft 0 in)
- Turned pro: 1973 (amateur tour from 1970)
- Retired: 1983
- Plays: Right-handed (one-handed backhand)
- Prize money: $2,217,971

Singles
- Career record: 544–268
- Career titles: 19
- Highest ranking: No. 4 (7 November 1976)

Grand Slam singles results
- French Open: SF (1976, 1977)
- Wimbledon: SF (1976)
- US Open: QF (1978)

Other tournaments
- Tour Finals: SF (1974)
- WCT Finals: QF (1975, 1976, 1978)

Doubles
- Career record: 583–194
- Career titles: 60
- Highest ranking: No. 1 (12 April 1976)

Grand Slam doubles results
- French Open: W (1975, 1977)
- Wimbledon: W (1976)
- US Open: F (1977)

Raúl Ramírez (born 20 June 1953) is a Mexican former professional tennis player.

He attended and played tennis at the University of Southern California in Los Angeles.

== Personal life ==
Ramírez was born in Ensenada, Baja California. In 1981, he married the Venezuelan-born former Miss Universe Maritza Sayalero. The couple lives in Ensenada and have three children: Rebecca (born 1982), Raúl (born 1984), and Daniel Francisco (1989).

== Career ==
Ramírez was active during the 1970s and 1980s.

He was in 40 singles finals where he won 19 titles and 21 runner-up titles, and participated in 101 doubles finals where he won 60 titles and 41 runner-up titles.

Ramírez was the first player to finish No. 1 in both singles and doubles Grand Prix point standings, accomplishing the feat in 1976.

He was ranked as high as World No. 4 in singles (achieved on November 7 1976) by the ATP ranking and he is one of the all-time leading doubles winners, having spent 62 weeks ranked World No. 1 in doubles, beginning 12 April 1976.

He participated in a total of 5 editions of the season-ending tournaments known in his time as the Masters Grand Prix or ATP Finals, in 1974, 1975, 1976, 1977 and 1978

Ramírez won 19 singles titles, including titles at the ATP Masters Series events in Rome (1975) and Monte Carlo (1978).

He won 60 doubles titles, including Wimbledon (1976), the French Open (1975 & '77), and at ATP Masters Series events in Cincinnati (1978), Canada (1976, ’77 & ’81), Monte Carlo (1979), Paris (1977), and Rome (1974, ’75, ’76 & ’77). He won the WCT World Doubles twice in 1975 and 1980. He won the men's singles in the Ojai Tennis Tournament in 1971.

He played tournaments of the two world tennis circuits played at the time, the Grand Prix tennis circuit and the World Championship Tennis (WCT). These circuits were predecessors of the Association of Tennis Professionals Tour (ATP Tour). In 1975 he won the Grand Prix, the present day equivalent of the Race.

== Grand Slam tournament finals ==
=== Doubles finals, 7 (3 titles, 4 runners-up) ===
Result	Year	Championship	Surface	Partner	Opponents	Score
Win	1975	French Open	Clay	(United States) Brian Gottfried	(Australia) John Alexander (Australia) Phil Dent	6–4, 2–6, 6–2, 6–4
Loss	1976	French Open	Clay	(United States) Brian Gottfried	(United States) Fred McNair (United States) Sherwood Stewart	6–7, 3–6, 1–6
Win	1976	Wimbledon	Grass	(United States) Brian Gottfried	(Australia) Ross Case (Australia) Geoff Masters	3–6, 6–3, 8–6, 2–6, 7–5
Win	1977	French Open (2)	Clay	(United States) Brian Gottfried	(Poland) Wojciech Fibak (Czechoslovakia) Jan Kodeš	7–6, 4–6, 6–3, 6–4
Loss	1977	US Open	Clay	(United States) Brian Gottfried	(South Africa) Bob Hewitt (South Africa) Frew McMillan	4–6, 0–6
Loss	1979	Wimbledon	Grass	(United States) Brian Gottfried	(United States) Peter Fleming (United States) John McEnroe	6–4, 4–6, 2–6, 2–6
Loss	1980	French Open (2)	Clay	(United States) Brian Gottfried	(United States) Victor Amaya (United States) Hank Pfister	6–1, 4–6, 4–6, 3–6

=== Mixed doubles final, 1 (runner-up) ===
Result	Year	Championship	Surface	Partner	Opponents	Score
Loss	1973	Wimbledon	Grass	(United States) Janet Newberry	(United States) Billie Jean King (Australia) Owen Davidson	3–6, 2–6

== ATP career finals ==
=== Singles: 40 (19 titles / 21 runner-ups) ===
Result	W–L	Date	Tournament	Surface	Opponent	Score
Loss	0–1	Jul 1973	Kitzbühel, Austria	Clay	(Spain) Manuel Orantes	ABN
Win	1–1	Oct 1973	Tehran, Iran	Clay	(Australia) John Newcombe	6–7, 6–1, 7–5, 6–3
Win	2–2	Feb 1974	Dayton, US	Carpet	(United States) Brian Gottfried	6–1, 6–4, 7–6^{(7–1)}
Win	3–1	Aug 1974	Columbus, US	Hard	(United States) Roscoe Tanner	3–6, 7–6, 6–4
Loss	3–2	Oct 1974	Tehran, Iran	Clay	(Argentina) Guillermo Vilas	0–6, 3–6, 1–6
Win	4–2	Feb 1975	St. Petersburg WCT, US	Hard	(United States) Roscoe Tanner	6–0, 1–6, 6–2
Loss	4–3	Mar 1975	Caracas WCT, Venezuela	Hard	(Australia) Rod Laver	6–7, 2–6
Win	5–3	Apr 1975	Charlotte, US	Clay	(United States) Roscoe Tanner	3–6, 6–4, 6–3
Win	6–3	Jun 1975	Rome, Italy	Clay	(Spain) Manuel Orantes	7–6, 7–5, 7–5
Win	7–3	Nov 1975	Tokyo, Japan	Clay	(Spain) Manuel Orantes	6–4, 7–5, 6–3
Win	8–3	Mar 1976	Mexico City WCT, Mexico	Clay	(United States) Eddie Dibbs	7–6, 6–2
Loss	8–4	Mar 1976	Jackson WCT, US	Carpet	(Australia) Ken Rosewall	3–6, 3–6
Win	9–4	Apr 1976	Caracas WCT, Venezuela	Clay	(Romania) Ilie Năstase	6–3, 6–4
Win	10–4	Jul 1976	Gstaad, Switzerland	Clay	(Italy) Adriano Panatta	7–5, 6–7, 6–1, 6–3
Loss	10–5	Jul 1976	Washington, D.C., US	Clay	(United States) Jimmy Connors	2–6, 4–6
Loss	10–6	Aug 1976	North Conway, US	Clay	(United States) Jimmy Connors	6–7, 6–4, 3–6
Loss	10–7	Oct 1976	Tehran, Iran	Clay	(Spain) Manuel Orantes	6–7, 0–6, 6–2, 4–6
Loss	10–8	Oct 1976	Vienna, Austria	Hard (i)	(Poland) Wojciech Fibak	7–6, 3–6, 4–6, 6–2, 1–6
Win	11–8	Nov 1976	London, UK	Carpet	(Spain) Manuel Orantes	6–3, 6–4
Loss	11–9	Feb 1977	Miami WCT, US	Clay	(United States) Eddie Dibbs	0–6, 3–6
Loss	11–10	May 1977	Las Vegas, US	Hard	(United States) Jimmy Connors	4–6, 7–5, 2–6
Win	12–10	Jun 1977	London/Queen's Club, UK	Grass	(United Kingdom) Mark Cox	9–7, 7–5
Win	13–10	Sep 1977	Los Angeles, II, US	Hard	(United States) Brian Gottfried	7–5, 3–6, 6–4
Loss	13–11	Nov 1977	Oviedo, Spain	Hard	(United States) Eddie Dibbs	4–6, 1–6
Win	14–11	Feb 1978	Mexico City WCT, Mexico	Hard	(United States) Pat DuPré	6–4, 6–1
Loss	14–12	Feb 1978	Rancho Mirage, US	Hard	(United States) Roscoe Tanner	1–6, 6–7
Loss	14–13	Mar 1978	Washington Indoor, US	Carpet	(United States) Brian Gottfried	5–7, 6–7
Loss	14–14	Apr 1978	Rotterdam WCT, Netherlands	Carpet	(United States) Jimmy Connors	5–7, 5–7
Win	15–14	Apr 1978	Monte Carlo WCT, Monaco	Clay	(Czechoslovakia) Tomáš Šmíd	6–3, 6–3, 6–4
Loss	15–15	Jun 1978	Birmingham, UK	Grass	(United States) Jimmy Connors	3–6, 1–6, 2–6
Loss	15–16	Jul 1978	Cincinnati, US	Hard	(United States) Eddie Dibbs	2–6, 3–6
Loss	15–17	Oct 1978	Mexico City, Mexico	Clay	(India) Vijay Amritraj	4–6, 4–6
Win	16–17	May 1979	Florence, Italy	Clay	(West Germany) Karl Meiler	6–4, 1–6, 3–6, 7–5, 6–0
Win	17–17	Feb 1980	San Juan, Puerto Rico	Hard	(Australia) Phil Dent	6–3, 6–2
Loss	17–18	May 1980	Florence, Italy	Clay	(Italy) Adriano Panatta	2–6, 6–2, 4–6
Loss	17–19	May 1981	Florence, Italy	Clay	(Argentina) José Luis Clerc	1–6, 2–6
Loss	17–20	Jan 1982	Viña del Mar, Chile	Clay	(Chile) Pedro Rebolledo	4–6, 6–3, 6–7
Win	18–20	Feb 1982	Caracas, Venezuela	Hard	(Hungary) Zoltan Kuharszky	4–6, 7–6, 6–3
Loss	18–21	Aug 1982	South Orange, US	Clay	(France) Yannick Noah	3–6, 6–7
Win	19–21	Feb 1983	Caracas, Venezuela	Hard	(United States) Morris Skip Strode	6–4, 6–2

=== Doubles: 101 (60 titles / 41 runners-up) ===
Result	W–L	Date	Tournament	Surface	Partner	Opponents	Score
Win	1–0	Feb 1973	Salt Lake City, US	Hard (i)	(United States) Mike Estep	(Czechoslovakia) Jiří Hřebec (Czechoslovakia) Jan Kukal	6–4, 7–6
Win	2–0	Jul 1973	Kitzbühel, Austria	Clay	(United States) Jim McManus	(Brazil) José Mandarino (Argentina) Tito Vázquez	6–2, 6–2, 6–3
Loss	2–1	Aug 1973	Cincinnati, US	Hard	(United States) Brian Gottfried	(Australia) John Alexander (Australia) Phil Dent	6–1, 6–7, 6–7
Win	3–1	Oct 1973	New Delhi, India	Outdoor	(United States) Jim McManus	(India) Anand Amritraj (India) Vijay Amritraj	6–2, 6–4
Win	4–1	Feb 1974	Toronto WCT, Canada	Carpet	(Australia) Tony Roche	(Netherlands) Tom Okker (United States) Marty Riessen	6–3, 2–6, 6–4
Win	5–1	Apr 1974	Charlotte, US	Clay	(United Kingdom) Buster Mottram	(Australia) Owen Davidson (Australia) John Newcombe	6–3, 1–6, 6–3
Loss	5–2	May 1974	Hamburg, Germany	Clay	(United States) Brian Gottfried	(West Germany) Jürgen Fassbender (West Germany) Hans-Jürgen Pohmann	3–6, 4–6, 4–6
Win	6–2	Jun 1974	Rome, Italy	Clay	(United States) Brian Gottfried	(Spain) Juan Gisbert, Sr. (Romania) Ilie Năstase	6–3, 6–2, 6–3
Loss	6–3	Jul 1974	Chicago, US	Carpet	(United States) Brian Gottfried	(United States) Tom Gorman (United States) Marty Riessen	6–4, 3–6, 5–7
Win	7–3	Aug 1974	South Orange, US	Hard	(United States) Brian Gottfried	(India) Anand Amritraj (India) Vijay Amritraj	7–6, 6–7, 7–6
Loss	7–4	Sep 1974	Los Angeles, US	Hard	(United States) Brian Gottfried	(Australia) Ross Case (Australia) Geoff Masters	3–6, 2–6
Loss	7–5	Oct 1974	Madrid, Spain	Clay	(United States) Brian Gottfried	(France) Patrice Dominguez (Spain) Antonio Muñoz	1–6, 3–6
Loss	7–6	Oct 1974	Tehran, Iran	Clay	(United States) Brian Gottfried	(Spain) Manuel Orantes (Argentina) Guillermo Vilas	6–7, 6–2, 2–6
Loss	7–7	Nov 1974	Paris Indoor, France	Hard (i)	(United States) Brian Gottfried	(France) Patrice Dominguez (France) François Jauffret	5–7, 4–6
Loss	7–8	Nov 1974	London, UK	Carpet	(United States) Brian Gottfried	(United States) Jimmy Connors (Romania) Ilie Năstase	6–3, 6–7, 3–6
Win	8–8	Jan 1975	Philadelphia WCT, US	Carpet	(United States) Brian Gottfried	(United States) Dick Stockton (United States) Erik van Dillen	3–6, 6–3, 7–6
Win	9–8	Feb 1975	St. Petersburg WCT, US	Hard	(United States) Brian Gottfried	(United States) Charlie Pasarell (United States) Roscoe Tanner	6–4, 6–4
Win	10–8	Feb 1975	La Costa WCT, US	Hard	(United States) Brian Gottfried	(United States) Charlie Pasarell (United States) Roscoe Tanner	7–5, 6–4
Loss	10–9	Mar 1975	São Paulo WCT, Brazil	Carpet	(United States) Brian Gottfried	(Australia) Ross Case (Australia) Geoff Masters	7–6, 6–7, 6–7
Loss	10–10	Mar 1975	Caracas WCT, Venezuela	Hard	(United States) Brian Gottfried	(Australia) Ross Case (Australia) Geoff Masters	5–7, 6–4, 2–6
Win	11–10	Mar 1975	Orlando WCT, US	Hard	(United States) Brian Gottfried	(Australia) Colin Dibley (Australia) Ray Ruffels	6–4, 6–4
Win	12–10	Apr 1975	Tucson, US	Hard	(United States) William Brown	(South Africa) Raymond Moore (United States) Dennis Ralston	2–6, 7–6, 6–4
Win	13–10	May 1975	World Doubles WCT, Mexico	Carpet	(United States) Brian Gottfried	(United Kingdom) Mark Cox (South Africa) Cliff Drysdale	7–6, 6–7, 6–2, 7–6
Win	14–10	May 1975	Dallas WCT, US	Carpet	(United States) Brian Gottfried	(South Africa) Bob Hewitt (South Africa) Frew McMillan	7–5, 6–3, 4–6, 2–6, 7–5
Win	15–10	Jun 1975	Rome, Italy	Clay	(United States) Brian Gottfried	(United States) Jimmy Connors (Romania) Ilie Năstase	6–4, 7–6, 2–6, 6–1
Win	16–10	Jun 1975	French Open, Paris	Clay	(United States) Brian Gottfried	(Australia) John Alexander (Australia) Phil Dent	6–4, 2–6, 6–2, 6–4
Loss	16–11	Jul 1975	Washington, D.C., US	Outdoor	(United States) Brian Gottfried	(United States) Robert Lutz (United States) Stan Smith	5–7, 6–2, 1–6
Win	17–11	Aug 1975	Boston, US	Clay	(United States) Brian Gottfried	(United States) John Andrews (United States) Mike Estep	4–6, 6–3, 7–6
Loss	17–12	Oct 1975	Melbourne Indoor, Australia	Grass	(United States) Brian Gottfried	(Australia) Ross Case (Australia) Geoff Masters	4–6, 0–6
Win	18–12	Oct 1975	Sydney Indoor, Australia	Hard (i)	(United States) Brian Gottfried	(Australia) Ross Case (Australia) Geoff Masters	6–4, 6–2
Win	19–12	Oct 1975	Perth, Australia	Hard	(United States) Brian Gottfried	(Australia) Ross Case (Australia) Geoff Masters	2–6, 6–4, 6–4, 6–0
Win	20–12	Nov 1975	Tokyo, Japan	Clay	(United States) Brian Gottfried	(Spain) Juan Gisbert, Sr. (Spain) Manuel Orantes	7–6, 6–4
Win	21–12	Jan 1976	Monterrey WCT, Mexico	Carpet	(United States) Brian Gottfried	(Australia) Ross Case (Australia) Geoff Masters	6–2, 4–6, 6–3
Win	22–12	Feb 1976	Richmond WCT, US	Carpet	(United States) Brian Gottfried	(United States) Arthur Ashe (Netherlands) Tom Okker	6–4, 7–5
Win	23–12	Feb 1976	St. Louis WCT, US	Carpet	(United States) Brian Gottfried	(Australia) John Alexander (Australia) Phil Dent	6–4, 6–2
Win	24–12	Mar 1976	Mexico City WCT, Mexico	Clay	(United States) Brian Gottfried	(Egypt) Ismail El Shafei (New Zealand) Brian Fairlie	6–4, 7–6
Win	25–12	Mar 1976	Jackson, US	Carpet	(United States) Brian Gottfried	(Australia) Ross Case (Australia) Geoff Masters	7–5, 4–6, 6–0
Win	26–12	Apr 1976	Caracas WCT, Venezuela	Clay	(United States) Brian Gottfried	(United States) Jeff Borowiak (Romania) Ilie Năstase	7–5, 6–4
Win	27–12	May 1976	Rome, Italy	Clay	(United States) Brian Gottfried	(Australia) Geoff Masters (Australia) John Newcombe	7–6, 5–7, 6–3, 3–6, 6–3
Loss	27–13	Jun 1976	French Open, Paris	Clay	(United States) Brian Gottfried	(United States) Fred McNair (United States) Sherwood Stewart	6–7, 3–6, 1–6
Win	28–13	Jul 1976	Wimbledon, London	Grass	(United States) Brian Gottfried	(Australia) Ross Case (Australia) Geoff Masters	3–6, 6–3, 8–6, 2–6, 7–5
Win	29–13	Jul 1976	Washington, D.C., US	Clay	(United States) Brian Gottfried	(United States) Arthur Ashe (United States) Jimmy Connors	6–3, 6–3
Win	30–13	Aug 1976	North Conway, US	Clay	(United States) Brian Gottfried	(Argentina) Ricardo Cano (Paraguay) Víctor Pecci	6–3, 6–0
Win	31–13	Aug 1976	Indianapolis, US	Clay	(United States) Brian Gottfried	(United States) Fred McNair (United States) Sherwood Stewart	6–2, 6–2
Win	32–13	Aug 1976	Toronto, Canada	Hard	(South Africa) Bob Hewitt	(Spain) Juan Gisbert, Sr. (Spain) Manuel Orantes	6–2, 6–1
Win	33–13	Sep 1976	Woodlands Doubles, US	Hard	(United States) Brian Gottfried	(Australia) Phil Dent (Australia) Allan Stone	6–1, 6–4, 5–7, 7–6
Win	34–13	Oct 1976	Tehran, Iran	Clay	(Poland) Wojciech Fibak	(Spain) Juan Gisbert, Sr. (Spain) Manuel Orantes	7–5, 6–1
Win	35–13	Oct 1976	Madrid, Spain	Clay	(Poland) Wojciech Fibak	(South Africa) Bob Hewitt (South Africa) Frew McMillan	4–6, 7–5, 6–3
Win	36–13	Oct 1976	Barcelona, Spain	Clay	(United States) Brian Gottfried	(South Africa) Bob Hewitt (South Africa) Frew McMillan	7–6, 6–4
Loss	36–14	Oct 1976	Vienna, Austria	Hard (i)	(United States) Brian Gottfried	(South Africa) Bob Hewitt (South Africa) Frew McMillan	4–6, 0–4, ret.
Win	37–14	Feb 1977	Miami, US	Clay	(United States) Brian Gottfried	(Australia) Paul Kronk (Australia) Cliff Letcher	7–5, 6–4
Loss	37–15	Mar 1977	Washington Indoor, US	Carpet	(United States) Brian Gottfried	(United States) Robert Lutz (United States) Stan Smith	3–6, 5–7
Loss	37–16	May 1977	Las Vegas, US	Hard	(South Africa) Bob Hewitt	(United States) Robert Lutz (United States) Stan Smith	3–6, 6–3, 4–6
Win	38–16	May 1977	Rome, Italy	Clay	(United States) Brian Gottfried	(United States) Fred McNair (United States) Sherwood Stewart	6–7, 7–6, 7–5
Win	39–16	Jun 1977	French Open, Paris	Clay	(United States) Brian Gottfried	(Poland) Wojciech Fibak (Czechoslovakia) Jan Kodeš	7–6, 4–6, 6–3, 6–4
Win	40–16	Aug 1977	North Conway, US	Clay	(United States) Brian Gottfried	(United States) Fred McNair (United States) Sherwood Stewart	7–5, 6–3
Win	41–16	Aug 1977	Toronto, Canada	Hard	(South Africa) Bob Hewitt	(United States) Fred McNair (United States) Sherwood Stewart	6–4, 3–6, 6–2
Loss	41–17	Sep 1977	U.S. Open, New York	Clay	(United States) Brian Gottfried	(South Africa) Bob Hewitt (South Africa) Frew McMillan	4–6, 0–6
Loss	41–18	Oct 1977	Maui, US	Hard	(United States) Brian Gottfried	(United States) Robert Lutz (United States) Stan Smith	6–7, 4–6
Win	42–18	Nov 1977	Paris Indoor, France	Hard (i)	(United States) Brian Gottfried	(United States) Jeff Borowiak (United Kingdom) Roger Taylor	6–2, 6–0
Loss	42–19	Nov 1977	Stockholm, Sweden	Hard (i)	(United States) Brian Gottfried	(Poland) Wojciech Fibak (Netherlands) Tom Okker	3–6, 3–6
Loss	42–20	Nov 1977	Wembley, UK	Hard	(United States) Brian Gottfried	(United States) Sandy Mayer (South Africa) Frew McMillan	3–6, 6–7
Loss	42–21	Nov 1977	Oviedo, Spain	Hard	(Czechoslovakia) Jan Kodeš	(United States) Fred McNair (United States) Sherwood Stewart	3–6, 1–6
Loss	42–22	Feb 1978	Mexico City WCT, Mexico	Hard	(Mexico) Marcelo Lara	(United States) Gene Mayer (India) Sashi Menon	3–6, 6–7
Win	43–22	Mar 1978	Memphis, US	Carpet	(United States) Brian Gottfried	(Australia) Phil Dent (Australia) John Newcombe	3–6, 7–6, 6–2
Loss	43–23	Apr 1978	Milan WCT, Italy	Carpet	(Poland) Wojciech Fibak	(Spain) José Higueras (Paraguay) Víctor Pecci	7–5, 6–7, 6–7
Win	44–23	Apr 1978	Rotterdam WCT, Netherlands	Carpet	(United States) Fred McNair	(United States) Robert Lutz (United States) Stan Smith	6–2, 6–3
Win	45–23	Jul 1978	Cincinnati, US	Clay	(United States) Gene Mayer	(Egypt) Ismail El Shafei (New Zealand) Brian Fairlie	6–3, 6–3
Loss	45–24	Apr 1978	Las Vegas, US	Hard	(South Africa) Bob Hewitt	(Chile) Jaime Fillol (Chile) Álvaro Fillol	3–6, 6–7
Loss	45–25	Jun 1978	London/Queen's Club, UK	Grass	(United States) Fred McNair	(South Africa) Bob Hewitt (South Africa) Frew McMillan	2–6, 5–7
Loss	45–26	Jul 1978	Washington, D.C., US	Clay	(United States) Fred McNair	(South Africa) Bob Hewitt (United States) Arthur Ashe	3–6, 4–6
Loss	45–27	Sep 1978	Los Angeles, US	Carpet	(United States) Fred McNair	(Australia) John Alexander (Australia) Phil Dent	3–6, 6–7
Loss	45–28	Oct 1978	Mexico City, Mexico	Clay	(United States) Fred McNair	(India) Anand Amritraj (India) Vijay Amritraj	4–6, 5–7
Win	46–28	Apr 1979	Monte Carlo, Monaco	Clay	(Romania) Ilie Năstase	(Paraguay) Víctor Pecci (Hungary) Balázs Taróczy	6–3, 6–4
Loss	46–29	Apr 1979	Las Vegas, US	Hard	(Italy) Adriano Panatta	(United States) Marty Riessen (United States) Sherwood Stewart	6–4, 4–6, 6–7
Loss	46–30	Jul 1979	Wimbledon, London	Grass	(United States) Brian Gottfried	(United States) Peter Fleming (United States) John McEnroe	6–4, 4–6, 2–6, 2–6
Loss	46–31	Jul 1979	Washington, D.C., US	Clay	(United States) Brian Gottfried	(United States) Marty Riessen (United States) Sherwood Stewart	6–2, 3–6, 4–6
Loss	46–32	Jul 1979	Louisville, US	Hard	(India) Vijay Amritraj	(United States) Marty Riessen (United States) Sherwood Stewart	2–6, 6–1, 1–6
Loss	46–33	Oct 1979	Basel, Switzerland	Hard (i)	(United States) Brian Gottfried	(South Africa) Bob Hewitt (South Africa) Frew McMillan	3–6, 4–6
Loss	46–34	Oct 1979	Vienna, Austria	Hard (i)	(United States) Brian Gottfried	(South Africa) Bob Hewitt (South Africa) Frew McMillan	4–6, 6–3, 1–6
Win	47–34	Jan 1980	Masters Doubles WCT, London	Carpet	(United States) Brian Gottfried	(Poland) Wojciech Fibak (Netherlands) Tom Okker	3–6, 6–4, 6–4, 3–6, 6–3
Loss	47–35	Jan 1980	Philadelphia, US	Carpet	(United States) Brian Gottfried	(United States) Peter Fleming (United States) John McEnroe	3–6, 6–7
Win	48–35	May 1980	Florence, Italy	Clay	(United States) Gene Mayer	(Italy) Paolo Bertolucci (Italy) Adriano Panatta	6–1, 6–4
Loss	48–36	Jun 1980	French Open, Paris	Clay	(United States) Brian Gottfried	(United States) Victor Amaya (United States) Hank Pfister	6–1, 4–6, 4–6, 3–6
Win	49–36	Sep 1980	Sawgrass Doubles, US	Hard	(United States) Brian Gottfried	(United States) Robert Lutz (United States) Stan Smith	7–6, 6–4, 2–6, 7–6
Loss	49–37	Feb 1981	Philadelphia, US	Carpet	(United States) Brian Gottfried	(United States) Marty Riessen (United States) Sherwood Stewart	2–6, 2–6
Loss	49–38	Feb 1981	Richmond WCT, US	Carpet	(United States) Brian Gottfried	(United States) Tim Gullikson (South Africa) Bernard Mitton	6–3, 2–6, 3–6
Win	50–38	Mar 1981	Milan, Italy	Carpet	(United States) Brian Gottfried	(United States) John McEnroe (United States) Peter Rennert	7–6, 6–3
Win	51–38	May 1981	Florence, Italy	Clay	(Czechoslovakia) Pavel Složil	(Italy) Paolo Bertolucci (Italy) Adriano Panatta	6–3, 3–6, 6–3
Win	52–38	Jul 1981	Boston, US	Clay	(Czechoslovakia) Pavel Složil	(Chile) Hans Gildemeister (Ecuador) Andrés Gómez	6–4, 7–6
Win	53–38	Jul 1981	Washington, D.C., US	Clay	(United States) Van Winitsky	(Czechoslovakia) Pavel Složil (United States) Ferdi Taygan	5–7, 7–6^{(9–7)}, 7–6^{(8–6)}
Loss	53–39	Aug 1981	Indianapolis, US	Clay	(United States) Van Winitsky	(South Africa) Kevin Curren (United States) Steve Denton	3–6, 7–5, 5–7
Win	54–39	Aug 1981	Montreal, Canada	Hard	(United States) Ferdi Taygan	(United States) Peter Fleming (United States) John McEnroe	2–6, 7–6, 6–4
Win	55–39	Jan 1982	Viña del Mar, Chile	Clay	(Spain) Manuel Orantes	(Argentina) Guillermo Aubone (Spain) Ángel Giménez	DEF
Win	56–39	Feb 1982	La Quinta, US	Hard	(United States) Brian Gottfried	(United Kingdom) John Lloyd (United States) Dick Stockton	6–4, 3–6, 6–2
Win	57–39	Jul 1982	Washington, D.C., US	Clay	(United States) Van Winitsky	(Chile) Hans Gildemeister (Ecuador) Andrés Gómez	7–5, 7–6
Win	58–39	Aug 1982	South Orange, US	Clay	(United States) Van Winitsky	(United States) Jai DiLouie (United States) Blaine Willenborg	3–6, 6–4, 6–1
Loss	58–40	Aug 1982	La Costa WCT, US	Hard	(United States) Robert Lutz	(United States) Fritz Buehning (United States) Johan Kriek	6–3, 6–7, 3–6
Win	59–40	Sep 1982	Sawgrass Doubles, US	Clay	(United States) Brian Gottfried	(Australia) Mark Edmondson (Australia) Kim Warwick	W/O
Loss	59–41	Jan 1983	Masters Doubles WCT, London	Carpet	(United States) Brian Gottfried	(Switzerland) Heinz Günthardt (Hungary) Balázs Taróczy	3–6, 5–7, 6–7
Win	60–41	Feb 1983	La Quinta, US	Hard	(United States) Brian Gottfried	(South Africa) Tian Viljoen (South Africa) Danie Visser	6–3, 6–3

== Grand slam tournament timelines ==
Key
W	F	SF	QF	#R	RR	Q#	DNQ	A	NH

(W) winner; (F) finalist; (SF) semifinalist; (QF) quarterfinalist; (#R) rounds 4, 3, 2, 1; (RR) round-robin stage; (Q#) qualification round; (DNQ) did not qualify; (A) absent; (NH) not held; (SR) strike rate (events won / competed); (W–L) win–loss record.

=== Singles ===
Tournament	1971	1972	1973	1974	1975	1976	1977	1978	1979	1980	1981	1982	1983	Career SR
Australian Open	A	A	A	A	A	A	A	A	A	A	A	A	A	0 / 0
French Open	A	A	2R	QF	QF	SF	SF	QF	1R	4R	1R	A	A	0 / 9
Wimbledon	A	A	1R	2R	QF	SF	2R	QF	2R	1R	2R	A	1R	0 / 10
US Open	1R	3R	3R	4R	4R	2R	1R	QF	1R	1R	2R	2R	A	0 / 12
Win–loss	0–1	2–1	3–3	8–3	11–3	11–3	6–3	12–3	1–3	3–3	2–3	1–1	0–1	N/A

=== Doubles ===
Tournament	1971	1972	1973	1974	1975	1976	1977	1978	1979	1980	1981	1982	1983	1984	1985	1986	Career SR
Australian Open	A	A	A	A	A	A	A	A	A	A	A	A	A	A	A	NH	0 / 0
French Open	A	A	1R	2R	W	F	W	SF	QF	F	1R	A	A	A	A	1R	2 / 10
Wimbledon	A	QF	3R	QF	2R	W	1R	QF	F	QF	3R	A	A	A	A	A	1 / 10
US Open	1R	2R	SF	QF	3R	2R	F	1R	2R	A	2R	SF	A	A	A	A	0 / 11
Win–loss	0–1	4–2	6–3	6–3	6–2	12–2	11–2	7–3	9–3	8–2	2–3	4–1	0–0	0–0	0–0	0–1	N/A
