= Peter Rennert =

American tennis player

- Country (sports): United States
- Residence: Great Neck, New York
- Born: December 26, 1958 (age 67) Great Neck, New York
- Height: 6 ft 1 in (1.85 m)
- Turned pro: 1980
- Retired: 1987
- Plays: Left-handed

Singles
- Career record: 48–60
- Career titles: 0
- Highest ranking: No. 40 (28 July 1980)

Grand Slam singles results
- Australian Open: QF (1979, 1980)
- Wimbledon: 3R (1982)
- US Open: 2R (1980)

Doubles
- Career record: 98–90
- Career titles: 2
- Highest ranking: No. 9 (23 May 1983)
Medal record
Maccabiah Games
Gold medal – first place	1977 Tel Aviv	Men's doubles
Gold medal – first place	1977 Tel Aviv	Mixed doubles

Peter Rennert (born December 26, 1958) is a former professional tennis player from the United States. He achieved career-high rankings of World No. 40 in singles (in 1980), and World No. 8 in doubles (in 1983). At the 1977 Maccabiah Games in Israel, he and partner Joel Ross won the men's doubles gold medal, and he and Stacy Margolin won the gold medal in mixed doubles.

== Biography ==
Rennert was born in Great Neck, New York, and is Jewish. He attended and played tennis for Great Neck North High School, and in 1976 won the singles title at the New York State Public High School Athletic Association's tennis championships.

He attended Stanford University, where he received a B.S. in Psychology and was an All-American. At Stanford, he was an NCAA singles finalist in 1980. He won three National Division 1 team titles and won College Player of the Year.

At the 1977 Maccabiah Games in Israel, he and partner Joel Ross won the men's doubles gold medal. He and Stacy Margolin won the gold medal in mixed doubles, defeating South Africa's Ilana Kloss and Graham Silverman.

Rennert enjoyed most of his tennis success while playing doubles. During his career he won two doubles titles. As a player, he trained with Harry Hopman and Wimbledon champion Tony Palafox. His best result as a singles player in a major was making it to the quarterfinals of the Australian Open twice.

Rennert now runs an awareness based Tennis curriculum business called Telos Tennis.

== Career finals ==
=== Doubles (2 titles, 4 runner-ups) ===
Result	W–L	Date	Tournament	Surface	Partner	Opponents	Score
Loss	0–1	Jul 1980	Newport, U.S.	Grass	(United States) Fritz Buehning	(Zimbabwe) Andrew Pattison (United States) Butch Walts	6–7, 4–6
Loss	0–2	Mar 1981	Milan, Italy	Carpet	(United States) John McEnroe	(United States) Brian Gottfried (Mexico) Raúl Ramírez	6–7, 3–6
Win	1–2	Jun 1982	London/Queen's Club, U.K.	Grass	(United States) John McEnroe	(United States) Victor Amaya (United States) Hank Pfister	7–6, 7–5
Win	2–2	Oct 1982	Sydney Indoor, Australia	Hard (i)	(United States) John McEnroe	(United States) Steve Denton (United States) Mark Edmondson	6–3, 7–6
Loss	2–3	Oct 1982	Tokyo Indoor, Japan	Carpet	(United States) John McEnroe	(United States) Tim Gullikson (United States) Tom Gullikson	4–6, 6–3, 6–7
Loss	2–4	Oct 1983	Sydney Indoor, Australia	Hard (i)	(United States) John McEnroe	(Australia) Mark Edmondson (United States) Sherwood Stewart	2–6, 4–6
