= Trey Waltke =

American tennis player (born 1955)

- Country (sports): United States
- Born: March 16, 1955 (age 71) St Louis, Missouri, U.S.
- Height: 5 ft 8 in (1.73 m)
- Plays: Right-handed

Singles
- Career titles: 0
- Highest ranking: No. 45 (9 March 1982)

Grand Slam singles results
- French Open: 2R (1975, 1977, 1980, 1981)
- Wimbledon: 2R (1980, 1983)
- US Open: 3R (1976, 1981)

Doubles
- Career titles: 0
- Highest ranking: No. 31 (10 December 1984)

Trey Waltke (born March 16, 1955) is a former professional tennis player from the U.S. active during the 1970s and 1980s.

Waltke came from St. Louis, Missouri, and he was one of the few players to beat John McEnroe and Jimmy Connors in the same year. During a first-round match at Wimbledon in 1983 against Stan Smith, Waltke caused a stir when he donned 1920s-era long flannel pants, a white buttoned-down long-sleeved shirt, and a necktie for a belt. He beat Smith in five sets but lost to Ivan Lendl in the second round.

== Grand Prix career finals ==
=== Singles (2 runners-up) ===
Result	W/L	Date	Tournament	Surface	Opponent	Score
Loss	0–1	Apr 1980	Tulsa, US	Hard	(United States) Howard Schoenfield	7–5, 1–6, 0–6
Loss	0–2	Oct 1980	Vienna, Austria	Hard	(United States) Brian Gottfried	2–6, 4–6, 3–6

=== Doubles (3 runners-up) ===
Result	W/L	Year	Tournament	Surface	Partner	Opponents	Score
Loss	0–1	Feb 1976	Salisbury, US	Carpet	(United States) Steve Krulevitz	(United States) Fred McNair (United States) Sherwood Stewart	3–6, 2–6
Loss	0–2	Sep 1977	Laguna Niguel, US	Hard	(United States) Peter Fleming	(United States) Chico Hagey (United States) Billy Martin	3–6, 4–6
Loss	0–3	Apr 1981	Las Vegas, US	Hard	(United States) Tracy Delatte	(United States) Peter Fleming (United States) John McEnroe	3–6, 6–7
