= 1981 Stowe Grand Prix – Doubles =

Doubles
- 1981 Stowe Grand Prix

Final
- Champions: (South Africa) Johan Kriek (United States) Larry Stefanki
- Runners-up: (United States) Brian Gottfried (United States) Bob Lutz
- Score: 2–6, 6–1, 6–2

Details
- Draw: 16
- Seeds: 4

Events
Singles	Doubles
- Stowe Open

Bob Lutz and Bernard Mitton were the defending champions, but Mitton chose to compete at Montreal during the same week, reaching the semifinals.

Lutz teamed up with Brian Gottfried and lost in the final to Johan Kriek and Larry Stefanki. The score was 2–6, 6–1, 6–2.

== Seeds ==
1. (United States) Brian Gottfried / (United States) Bob Lutz (final)
2. (United States) Fritz Buehning / (United States) Dick Stockton (semifinals)
3. (United States) Marcel Freeman / (United States) John Hayes (first round)
4. (United States) Charles Strode / (United States) Morris Strode (first round)

== Draw ==
Key

- Q = Qualifier
- WC = Wild card
- LL = Lucky loser
- Alt = Alternate
- ITF = ITF entry
- PR = Protected ranking
- SR = Special ranking
- SE = Special exempt
- JE = Junior exempt
- JR = Junior Accelerator Programme entrant
- CO = College Accelerator Programme entrant
- NG = Next Gen Accelerator Program entrant
- w/o = Walkover
- r = Retired
- d = Defaulted

=== Draw ===
First round
1	(United States) B Gottfried (United States) B Lutz	6	6
(United States) A Chandronnait (United States) Phil Kadesch	2	2
(United States) D Gitlin (United States) J Lapidus	3	6	6
(United States) J Arias (United States) R Hightower	6	4	3
(United States) T Delatte (United States) M Mitchell	7	7
(United Kingdom) A Jarrett (United Kingdom) J Smith	5	6
(United States) C Mayotte (United States) T Mayotte	6	7
3	(United States) M Freeman (United States) J Hayes	4	6
4	(United States) C Strode (United States) M Strode	6	2
(Republic of Ireland) M Doyle (United States) M Fishbach	7	6
(South Africa) J Kriek (United States) L Stefanki	6	7
(Venezuela) J Andrew (Chile) J Núñez	1	6
(United States) G Hardie (France) G Moretton	7	6
(Australia) J Alexander (Socialist Federal Republic of Yugoslavia) M Ostoja	6	4
(United States) L Bourne (United States) T Graham	7	4	4
2	(United States) F Buehning (United States) D Stockton	6	6	6

Quarterfinals
1	(United States) B Gottfried (United States) B Lutz	6	7
(United States) D Gitlin (United States) J Lapidus	3	6
(United States) T Delatte (United States) M Mitchell	4	4
(United States) C Mayotte (United States) T Mayotte	6	6
(Republic of Ireland) M Doyle (United States) M Fishbach	3	6	3
(South Africa) J Kriek (United States) L Stefanki	6	3	6
(United States) G Hardie (France) G Moretton	4	7	6
2	(United States) F Buehning (United States) D Stockton	6	6	7

Semifinals
1	(United States) B Gottfried (United States) B Lutz	7	4	6
(United States) C Mayotte (United States) T Mayotte	6	6	3
(South Africa) J Kriek (United States) L Stefanki	1	7	7
2	(United States) F Buehning (United States) D Stockton	6	6	6

Final
1	(United States) B Gottfried (United States) B Lutz	6	1	2
(South Africa) J Kriek (United States) L Stefanki	2	6	6
