= 1981 Stowe Grand Prix – Singles =

Singles
- 1981 Stowe Grand Prix

Final
- Champion: (United States) Brian Gottfried
- Runner-up: (United States) Tony Graham
- Score: 6–3, 6–3

Details
- Draw: 32 (4Q)
- Seeds: 8

Events
Singles	Doubles
- Stowe Open

Bob Lutz was the defending champion, but lost in the first round to Charles Strode.

Brian Gottfried won the title by defeating Tony Graham 6–3, 6–3 in the final.

== Seeds ==
1. (South Africa) Johan Kriek (quarterfinals)
2. (United States) Brian Gottfried (champion)
3. (United States) Bob Lutz (first round)
4. (United States) Fritz Buehning (quarterfinals)
5. (United States) Tim Mayotte (second round)
6. (United States) Jimmy Arias (semifinals)
7. (United States) John Hayes (first round)
8. (United States) Ron Hightower (first round)

== Draw ==
Key

- Q = Qualifier
- WC = Wild card
- LL = Lucky loser
- Alt = Alternate
- ITF = ITF entry
- PR = Protected ranking
- SR = Special ranking
- SE = Special exempt
- JE = Junior exempt
- JR = Junior Accelerator Programme entrant
- CO = College Accelerator Programme entrant
- NG = Next Gen Accelerator Program entrant
- w/o = Walkover
- r = Retired
- d = Defaulted

=== Finals ===
Semifinals
(United States) Tony Graham	6	6
6	(United States) Jimmy Arias	3	2
(Socialist Federal Republic of Yugoslavia) Marko Ostoja	6	0	6
2	(United States) Brian Gottfried	4	6	7

Final
(United States) Tony Graham	3	3
2	(United States) Brian Gottfried	6	6

=== Top half ===
First round
1	(South Africa) J Kriek	6	6
(United States) G Hardie	2	2
(Finland) L Palin	2	1
(United States) D Stockton	6	6
(Australia) J Alexander	3	2
(United States) T Graham	6	6
(United States) C Mayotte	6	6
7	(United States) J Hayes	3	4
4	(United States) F Buehning	6	4	6
(United States) M Fishbach	2	6	0
(Chile) J Núñez	0	3
Q	(United States) John Davis	6	6
(United States) M Mitchell	6	6
(Venezuela) J Andrew	3	2
Q	(United States) J Lapidus	5	2
6	(United States) J Arias	7	6

Second round
1	(South Africa) J Kriek	0	6	7
(United States) D Stockton	6	4	6
(United States) T Graham	7	7
(United States) C Mayotte	6	6
4	(United States) F Buehning	6	6
Q	(United States) J Davis	1	0
(United States) M Mitchell	3	7	5
6	(United States) J Arias	6	5	7

Quarterfinals
1	(South Africa) J Kriek	3	2
(United States) T Graham	6	6
4	(United States) F Buehning	3	1
6	(United States) J Arias	6	6

Semifinals
(United States) T Graham	6	6
6	(United States) J Arias	3	2

=== Bottom half ===
First round
5	(United States) T Mayotte	6	6
(United States) Gewan Maharaj	3	1
Q	(United States) T Delatte	6	2	1
(Socialist Federal Republic of Yugoslavia) M Ostoja	2	6	6
(United States) L Stefanki	6	6
(United Kingdom) J Smith	3	3
(United States) C Strode	6	6	6
3	(United States) B Lutz	7	2	1
8	(United States) R Hightower	3	6	6
(France) G Moretton	6	2	7
(United States) M Strode	4	5
(United States) L Bourne	6	7
Q	(United States) M Leach	6	6
(Republic of Ireland) M Doyle	3	4
(Australia) I Fletcher	2	3
2	(United States) B Gottfried	6	6

Second round
5	(United States) T Mayotte	6	6	2
(Socialist Federal Republic of Yugoslavia) M Ostoja	7	4	6
(United States) L Stefanki	6	6
(United States) C Strode	3	1
(France) G Moretton	7	6	7
(United States) L Bourne	6	7	6
Q	(United States) M Leach	6	3	2
2	(United States) B Gottfried	4	6	6

Quarterfinals
(Socialist Federal Republic of Yugoslavia) M Ostoja	6	7
(United States) L Stefanki	1	6
(France) G Moretton	1	2
2	(United States) B Gottfried	6	6

Semifinals
(Socialist Federal Republic of Yugoslavia) M Ostoja	6	0	6
2	(United States) B Gottfried	4	6	7
