= 1978 Volvo International – Singles =

Singles
- 1978 Volvo International

Final
- Champion: (United States) Eddie Dibbs
- Runner-up: (Australia) John Alexander
- Score: 6–4, 6–4

Details
- Draw: 48
- Seeds: 16

Events
Singles	Doubles
← 1977 ·	Volvo International	· 1979 →

John Alexander was the defending champion but lost in the final 6–4, 6–4 against Eddie Dibbs.

== Seeds ==
All sixteen seeds received a bye to the second round.

1. (United States) Eddie Dibbs (champion)
2. (United States) Brian Gottfried (third round)
3. (Spain) Manuel Orantes (semifinals)
4. (Italy) Corrado Barazzutti (semifinals)
5. (United States) Harold Solomon (quarterfinals)
6. (Spain) José Higueras (second round)
7. (Poland) Wojciech Fibak (quarterfinals)
8. (Australia) Ken Rosewall (second round)
9. (Australia) John Alexander (final)
10. (United States) Arthur Ashe (third round)
11. (Chile) Jaime Fillol (third round)
12. (United States) Tim Gullikson (third round)
13. (United States) Stan Smith (second round)
14. (Chile) Hans Gildemeister (third round)
15. (United States) Robert Lutz (second round)
16. (United States) Hank Pfister (third round)

== Draw ==
=== Key ===
- Q = Qualifier
- WC = Wild card
- LL = Lucky loser
- Alt = Alternate
- SE = Special exempt
- PR = Protected ranking
- ITF = ITF entry
- JE = Junior exempt
- w/o = Walkover
- r = Retired
- d = Defaulted
- SR = Special ranking

=== Finals ===
Semifinals
1	(United States) Eddie Dibbs	2	7	6
3	(Spain) Manuel Orantes	6	6	4
4	(Italy) Corrado Barazzutti	3	3
9	(Australia) John Alexander	6	6

Final
1	(United States) Eddie Dibbs	6	6
9	(Australia) John Alexander	4	4

=== Top half ===
==== Section 1 ====
First round
(South Africa) B Hewitt	3	3
(United States) V Winitsky	6	6
(South Africa) B Mitton	1	6	6
(Australia) D Crealy	6	1	4
(United States) A Chandronnait	2	1
(United States) Tom Gullikson	6	6
(Sweden) D Palm	6	7
(United States) J Sadri	4	5

Second round
1	(United States) E Dibbs	6	6
(United States) V Winitsky	1	0
(South Africa) B Mitton	3	6	2
11	(Chile) J Fillol	6	0	6
15	(United States) R Lutz	5	4
(United States) Tom Gullikson	7	6
(Sweden) D Palm	0	1
5	(United States) H Solomon	6	6

Third round
1	(United States) E Dibbs	6	6
11	(Chile) J Fillol	4	1
(United States) Tom Gullikson	4	4
5	(United States) H Solomon	6	6

Quarterfinals
1	(United States) E Dibbs	7	6
5	(United States) H Solomon	6	3

==== Section 2 ====
First round
(United States) M Fishbach	6	6
Q	(United States) L Gottfried	1	1
Q	(United States) D Crawford	5	4
(United States) N Saviano	7	6
(Sweden) J Norbäck	2	6	1
(Australia) J Bartlett	6	4	6
(Switzerland) C Dowdeswell	4	5
(Australia) C Letcher	6	7

Second round
3	(Spain) M Orantes	6	6
(United States) M Fishbach	0	2
(United States) N Saviano	6	1
14	(Chile) H Gildemeister	7	6
10	(United States) A Ashe	6	6
(Australia) J Bartlett	2	2
(Australia) C Letcher	4	3
7	(Poland) W Fibak	6	6

Third round
3	(Spain) M Orantes	4	6	6
14	(Chile) H Gildemeister	6	0	3
10	(United States) A Ashe	6	4	1
7	(Poland) W Fibak	0	6	6

Quarterfinals
3	(Spain) M Orantes	4	6	6
7	(Poland) W Fibak	6	2	4

=== Bottom half ===
==== Section 3 ====
First round
(United States) G Mayer	7	7
(United Kingdom) R Drysdale	6	6
Q	(Italy) R Lombardi	3	4
(United States) B Manson	6	6
Q	(United States) T Garcia	4	7	6
(United States) P Pearson	6	5	2
(Paraguay) F González	3	6	6
(Australia) R Frawley	6	0	3

Second round
6	(Spain) J Higueras	0	1
(United States) G Mayer	6	6
(United States) B Manson	6	6
13	(United States) S Smith	4	1
16	(United States) H Pfister	6	6	6
(United States) T Garcia	7	4	0
(Paraguay) F González	1	2
4	(Italy) C Barazzutti	6	6

Third round
(United States) G Mayer	6	2	6
(United States) B Manson	2	6	4
16	(United States) H Pfister	2	6	4
4	(Italy) C Barazzutti	6	3	6

Quarterfinals
(United States) G Mayer	6	4	6
4	(Italy) C Barazzutti	3	6	7

==== Section 4 ====
First round
(Switzerland) H Günthardt	6	6
(Socialist Federal Republic of Yugoslavia) Ž Franulović	3	3
(South Africa) J Kriek	4	6	6
(United States) C Mayotte	6	2	1
Q	(Australia) P Kronk	4	1
Q	(United States) C Sylvan	6	6
(United States) P Du Pré	6	6	7
(Austria) H Kary	3	7	6

Second round
8	(Australia) K Rosewall	7	5	1
(Switzerland) H Günthardt	5	7	6
(South Africa) J Kriek	7	3	3
12	(United States) Tim Gullikson	6	6	6
9	(Australia) J Alexander	6	6
Q	(United States) C Sylvan	4	2
(United States) P Du Pré	5	3
2	(United States) B Gottfried	7	6

Third round
(Switzerland) H Günthardt	6	6
12	(United States) Tim Gullikson	4	4
9	(Australia) J Alexander	6	3	7
2	(United States) B Gottfried	2	6	6

Quarterfinals
(Switzerland) H Günthardt	4	4
9	(Australia) J Alexander	6	6
