= 1977 Volvo International – Singles =

Singles
- 1977 Volvo International

Final
- Champion: (Australia) John Alexander
- Runner-up: (Spain) Manuel Orantes
- Score: 2–6, 6–4, 6–4

Details
- Draw: 64
- Seeds: 8

Events
Singles	Doubles
← 1976 ·	Volvo International	· 1978 →

Jimmy Connors was the defending champion but lost in the quarterfinals to Harold Solomon.

John Alexander won in the final 2–6, 6–4, 6–4 against Manuel Orantes.

== Seeds ==
1. (United States) Jimmy Connors (quarterfinals)
2. (United States) Brian Gottfried (quarterfinals)
3. (Mexico) Raúl Ramírez (second round)
4. (Spain) Manuel Orantes (final)
5. (United States) Stan Smith (second round)
6. (Australia) Ken Rosewall (quarterfinals)
7. (United States) Harold Solomon (semifinals)
8. (United States) Eddie Dibbs (semifinals)

== Draw ==
=== Key ===
- Q = Qualifier
- WC = Wild card
- LL = Lucky loser
- Alt = Alternate
- SE = Special exempt
- PR = Protected ranking
- ITF = ITF entry
- JE = Junior exempt
- w/o = Walkover
- r = Retired
- d = Defaulted
- SR = Special ranking

=== Finals ===
Semifinals
7	(United States) Harold Solomon	4	1
(Australia) John Alexander	6	6
4	(Spain) Manuel Orantes	6	7
8	(United States) Eddie Dibbs	4	6

Final
(Australia) John Alexander	2	6	6
4	(Spain) Manuel Orantes	6	4	4

=== Top half ===
==== Section 1 ====
First round
1	(United States) J Connors	6	6
(United States) J Delaney	3	3
(West Germany) W Zirngibl	6	3	6
(Australia) M Edmondson	4	6	3
(South Africa) D Joubert	2	6
(United States) Z Guerry	6	7
(United States) F Taygan	2	1
(Paraguay) V Pecci	6	6
(United States) A Ashe	6	6
(United States) J DiLouie	4	4
(United States) T Wilkison	6	6
(United States) T Waltke	0	2
(United States) M Cahill	6	7	3
(Rhodesia) A Pattison	7	6	6
(South Africa) W Prinsloo	1	2
7	(United States) H Solomon	6	6

Second round
1	(United States) J Connors	7	6
(West Germany) W Zirngibl	6	0
(United States) Z Guerry	3	6	6
(Paraguay) V Pecci	6	4	2
(United States) A Ashe	6	5	6
(United States) T Wilkison	4	7	2
(Rhodesia) A Pattison	6	2
7	(United States) H Solomon	7	6

Third round
1	(United States) J Connors	6	6
(United States) Z Guerry	2	2
(United States) A Ashe	2	6	3
7	(United States) H Solomon	6	2	6

Quarterfinals
1	(United States) J Connors	6	4	1
7	(United States) H Solomon	1	6	6

==== Section 2 ====
First round
3	(Mexico) R Ramírez	6	6
(United States) Tim Gullikson	4	2
(Canada) G Halder	5	6	6
(United States) S Stewart	7	4	2
(India) S Menon	4	4
(United States) B Manson	6	6
(United States) R Fagel	6	4	2
(Australia) J Alexander	1	6	6
(Australia) K Warwick	4	7	7
(West Germany) F Gebert	6	6	6
(South Africa) J Eagleton	0	1
(United States) S Krulevitz	6	6
(United States) G Hardie	2	6	6
(United States) T Moor	6	1	7
(Ecuador) R Ycaza	2	0
5	(United States) S Smith	6	6

Second round
3	(Mexico) R Ramírez	4	6	4
(Canada) G Halder	6	2	6
(United States) B Manson	0	3
(Australia) J Alexander	6	6
(Australia) K Warwick	6	4	3
(United States) S Krulevitz	0	6	6
(United States) T Moor	7	6
5	(United States) S Smith	6	3

Third round
(Canada) G Halder	4	3
(Australia) J Alexander	6	6
(United States) S Krulevitz	6	6	7
(United States) T Moor	1	7	6

Quarterfinals
(Australia) J Alexander	7	7
(United States) S Krulevitz	6	6

=== Bottom half ===
==== Section 3 ====
First round
6	(Australia) K Rosewall	6	6
(Egypt) I El Shafei	1	4
(United States) Tom Gullikson	6	1	7
(Argentina) L Álvarez	2	6	6
(United States) D Crawford	1	2
(France) B Fritz	6	6
(United States) D Bohrnstedt	7	7
(Socialist Federal Republic of Yugoslavia) N Špear	5	6
(New Zealand) B Fairlie	6	6
(Switzerland) C Dowdeswell	3	3
(United States) C Mayotte	2	4
(Colombia) Á Betancur	6	6
(France) J-F Caujolle	6	6
(United States) F McNair	2	2
(Australia) J Bartlett	1	1
4	(Spain) M Orantes	6	6

Second round
6	(Australia) K Rosewall	6	6
(United States) Tom Gullikson	0	1
(France) B Fritz	6	6
(United States) D Bohrnstedt	3	3
(New Zealand) B Fairlie	6	6
(Colombia) Á Betancur	1	0
(France) J-F Caujolle	6	0
4	(Spain) M Orantes	7	6

Third round
6	(Australia) K Rosewall	6	7	6
(France) B Fritz	7	6	4
(New Zealand) B Fairlie	3	0
4	(Spain) M Orantes	6	6

Quarterfinals
6	(Australia) K Rosewall	7	4	3
4	(Spain) M Orantes	6	6	6

==== Section 4 ====
First round
8	(United States) E Dibbs	6	6
(United States) V Amaya	3	4
(United States) A Chandronnait	1	4
(Mexico) E Montaño	6	6
(India) A Amritraj	7	0	5
(Australia) C Kachel	5	6	7
(United Kingdom) R Lewis	2	4
(United States) H Pfister	6	6
(United States) R Lutz	6	6
(Sweden) J Norbäck	1	0
(Colombia) I Molina	7	6
(Bolivia) R Benavides	5	1
(South Africa) J Yuill	6	6
(United States) J C Hagey	3	4
(Austria) H Kary	2	1
2	(United States) B Gottfried	6	6

Second round
8	(United States) E Dibbs	6	6
(Mexico) E Montaño	1	2
(Australia) C Kachel	2	6
(United States) H Pfister	6	7
(United States) R Lutz	6	7
(Colombia) I Molina	3	6
(South Africa) J Yuill	3	6
2	(United States) B Gottfried	6	7

Third round
8	(United States) E Dibbs	7	6
(United States) H Pfister	5	3
(United States) R Lutz	3	6	3
2	(United States) B Gottfried	6	3	6

Quarterfinals
8	(United States) E Dibbs	5	6	7
2	(United States) B Gottfried	7	4	6
