= 1978 Volvo International – Doubles =

Doubles
- 1978 Volvo International

Final
- Champion: (United Kingdom) Robin Drysdale (United States) Van Winitsky
- Runner-up: (United States) Mike Fishbach (South Africa) Bernard Mitton
- Score: 6–3, 6–4

Details
- Draw: 24
- Seeds: 8

Events
Singles	Doubles
- Volvo International

The 1978 Volvo International – Doubles was an event of the 1978 Volvo International tennis tournament and was played on outdoor clay courts at the Mt. Cranmore Stadium in North Conway, New Hampshire in the United States, between July 31 and August 6, 1978. The draw comprised 24 teams and eight of them were seeded. Brian Gottfried and Raúl Ramírez were the defending Volvo International doubles champions but did not compete together in this edition. The unseeded team of Robin Drysdale and Van Winitsky won the doubles title after a straight-sets win in the final against unseeded pairing Mike Fishbach and Bernard Mitton, 6–3, 6–4.

== Seeds ==
1. (United States) Bob Lutz / (United States) Stan Smith (second round)
2. (Australia) John Alexander / (Poland) Wojciech Fibak (quarterfinals)
3. (United States) Arthur Ashe / (South Africa) Bob Hewitt (first round)
4. (United States) Gene Mayer / (United States) Hank Pfister (semifinals)
5. (Spain) José Higueras / (Spain) Manuel Orantes (quarterfinals)
6. (Chile) Jaime Fillol / (Chile) Álvaro Fillol (second round)
7. (United States) Tim Gullikson / (United States) Tom Gullikson (second round)
8. (Australia) Paul Kronk / (Australia) Cliff Letcher (second round)

== Draw ==
Key

- Q = Qualifier
- WC = Wild card
- LL = Lucky loser
- Alt = Alternate
- ITF = ITF entry
- PR = Protected ranking
- SR = Special ranking
- SE = Special exempt
- JE = Junior exempt
- JR = Junior Accelerator Programme entrant
- CO = College Accelerator Programme entrant
- NG = Next Gen Accelerator Program entrant
- w/o = Walkover
- r = Retired
- d = Defaulted

=== Finals ===
Semifinals
(United Kingdom) Colin Dowdeswell (Switzerland) Heinz Günthardt	1	3
(United Kingdom) Robin Drysdale (United States) Van Winitsky	6	6
4	(United States) Gene Mayer (United States) Hank Pfister	6	4
(United States) Mike Fishbach (South Africa) Bernard Mitton	7	6

Final
(United Kingdom) Robin Drysdale (United States) Van Winitsky	4	7	6
(United States) Mike Fishbach (South Africa) Bernard Mitton	6	6	3

=== Top half ===
First Round
(United Kingdom) Colin Dowdeswell (Switzerland) Heinz Günthardt	6	6
(United States) Ted Hoehn (United States) Tim Mayotte	4	4
(Socialist Federal Republic of Yugoslavia) Željko Franulović (Chile) Hans Gildemeister	6	7
(United States) Brian Gottfried (United States) Larry Gottfried	4	6
3	(United States) Arthur Ashe (South Africa) Bob Hewitt	6	7	4
(United Kingdom) Robin Drysdale (United States) Van Winitsky	7	6	6
(Sweden) Jan Norbäck (Sweden) Douglas Palm	6	5	6
(United States) Alan Chandronnait (United States) Chris Mayotte	1	7	4

Second Round
1	(United States) Bob Lutz (United States) Stan Smith	4	6
(United Kingdom) Colin Dowdeswell (Switzerland) Heinz Günthardt	6	7
(Socialist Federal Republic of Yugoslavia) Željko Franulović (Chile) Hans Gildemeister	0	6	6
8	(Australia) Paul Kronk (Australia) Cliff Letcher	6	4	4
(United Kingdom) Robin Drysdale (United States) Van Winitsky	3	6	6
(United States) Johan Kriek (United States) Peter Pearson	6	3	3
(Sweden) Jan Norbäck (Sweden) Douglas Palm	0	4
5	(Spain) José Higueras (Spain) Manuel Orantes	6	6

Quarterfinals
(United Kingdom) Colin Dowdeswell (Switzerland) Heinz Günthardt	6	4	6
(Socialist Federal Republic of Yugoslavia) Željko Franulović (Chile) Hans Gildemeister	4	6	4
(United Kingdom) Robin Drysdale (United States) Van Winitsky	6	7
5	(Spain) José Higueras (Spain) Manuel Orantes	4	5

Semifinals
(United Kingdom) Colin Dowdeswell (Switzerland) Heinz Günthardt	1	3
(United Kingdom) Robin Drysdale (United States) Van Winitsky	6	6

=== Bottom half ===
First Round
6	(Chile) Jaime Fillol (Chile) Álvaro Fillol	4	6	6
(Italy) Roberto Lombardi (New Zealand) John Ross	6	2	2
(Paraguay) Francisco Gonzalez (United States) Chris Sylvan	7	6	3^{r}
4	(United States) Gene Mayer (United States) Hank Pfister	6	7	5
(Australia) John Bartlett (United States) Tim Garcia	2	1
(United States) Mike Fishbach (South Africa) Bernard Mitton	6	6
(United States) Jerry Cromwell (United States) Paul Sullivan	1	3
(Italy) Corrado Barazzutti (Austria) Hans Kary	6	6

Second Round
6	(Chile) Jaime Fillol (Chile) Álvaro Fillol	5	5
(Australia) David Graham (United States) John Sadri	7	7
(Australia) Dick Crealy (United States) Pat DuPré	4	3
4	(United States) Gene Mayer (United States) Hank Pfister	6	6
7	(United States) Tim Gullikson (United States) Tom Gullikson	3	4
(United States) Mike Fishbach (South Africa) Bernard Mitton	6	6
(Italy) Corrado Barazzutti (Austria) Hans Kary	6	4
2	(Australia) John Alexander (Poland) Wojciech Fibak	7	6

Quarterfinals
(Australia) David Graham (United States) John Sadri	3	5
4	(United States) Gene Mayer (United States) Hank Pfister	6	7
(United States) Mike Fishbach (South Africa) Bernard Mitton	6	6
2	(Australia) John Alexander (Poland) Wojciech Fibak	4	4

Semifinals
4	(United States) Gene Mayer (United States) Hank Pfister	6	4
(United States) Mike Fishbach (South Africa) Bernard Mitton	7	6
