= 1979 Volvo International – Doubles =

Doubles
- 1979 Volvo International
- 1978 Champions: (United Kingdom) Robin Drysdale (United States) Van Winitsky

Final
- Champions: (Romania) Ion Țiriac (Argentina) Guillermo Vilas
- Runners-up: (United States) John Sadri (United States) Tim Wilkison
- Score: 6–4, 7–6

Details
- Draw: 32
- Seeds: 8

Events
Singles	Doubles
← 1978 ·	Volvo International	· 1980 →

Robin Drysdale and Van Winitsky were the defending champions but only Winitsky competed that year with Patricio Rodríguez.

Rodríguez and Winitsky lost in the first round to Colin Dowdeswell and Peter McNamara.

Ion Țiriac and Guillermo Vilas won in the final 6–4, 7–6 against John Sadri and Tim Wilkison.

== Seeds ==
Champion seeds are indicated in bold text while text in italics indicates the round in which those seeds were eliminated.

1. (United States) Brian Gottfried / (Mexico) Raúl Ramírez (quarterfinals)
2. (Romania) **Ion Țiriac** / (Argentina) **Guillermo Vilas (champions)**
3. (United States) Tom Gullikson / (Hungary) Balázs Taróczy (first round)
4. (Australia) Mark Edmondson / (Australia) John Marks (first round)
5. (Australia) John Alexander / (Australia) Phil Dent (first round)
6. (United States) Bruce Manson / (United States) Brian Teacher (quarterfinals)
7. (Australia) Ross Case / (Chile) Jaime Fillol (quarterfinals)
8. (Switzerland) Colin Dowdeswell / (Australia) Peter McNamara (semifinals)

== Draw ==
=== Key ===
- Q = Qualifier
- WC = Wild card
- LL = Lucky loser
- Alt = Alternate
- SE = Special exempt
- PR = Protected ranking
- ITF = ITF entry
- JE = Junior exempt
- w/o = Walkover
- r = Retired
- d = Defaulted
- SR = Special ranking

=== Final ===
Final
	(United States) John Sadri (United States) Tim Wilkison	4	6
2	(Romania) **Ion Țiriac** (Argentina) **Guillermo Vilas**	**6**	**7**

=== Top half ===
First round
1	(United States) **B Gottfried** (Mexico) **R Ramírez**	**7**	**6**
(United States) J DiLouie (United States) R Van't Hof	5	4
(Argentina) **R Cano** (Ecuador) **A Gómez**	**6**	**6**
(Iran) A Madani (Chile) J Núñez	2	3
(United States) **K Richardson** (South Africa) **J Yuill**	**6**	**6**
(United States) George Glowa (United States) T Mayotte	3	3
(Chile) P Rodríguez (United States) V Winitsky	3	3
8	(Switzerland) **C Dowdeswell** (Australia) **P McNamara**	**6**	**6**
4	(Australia) M Edmondson (Australia) J Marks	**6**	3	2
(Paraguay) **F González** (United States) **E Teltscher**	4	**6**	**6**
(United States) **B Maze** (United States) **B Walts**	**7**	**6**
(Italy) C Barazzutti (United States) L Bourne	5	1
(Australia) J Bartlett (Australia) W Maher	1	**6**	2
(United States) **A Kohlberg** (Sweden) **J Norbäck**	**6**	4	**6**
(United States) **J Sadri** (United States) **T Wilkison**	4	**6**	**6**
5	(Australia) J Alexander (Australia) P Dent	**6**	2	4

Second round
1	(United States) **B Gottfried** (Mexico) **R Ramírez**	**6**	**6**
(Argentina) R Cano (Ecuador) A Gómez	2	2
(United States) K Richardson (South Africa) J Yuill	3	2
8	(Switzerland) **C Dowdeswell** (Australia) **P McNamara**	**6**	**6**
(Paraguay) F González (United States) E Teltscher	6	3
(United States) **B Maze** (United States) **B Walts**	**7**	**6**
(United States) A Kohlberg (Sweden) J Norbäck	2	1
(United States) **J Sadri** (United States) **T Wilkison**	**6**	**6**

Quarterfinals
1	(United States) B Gottfried (Mexico) R Ramírez	2	0
8	(Switzerland) **C Dowdeswell** (Australia) **P McNamara**	**6**	**6**
(United States) B Maze (United States) B Walts	1	**6**	5
(United States) **J Sadri** (United States) **T Wilkison**	**6**	3	**7**

Semifinals
8	(Switzerland) C Dowdeswell (Australia) P McNamara	**6**	5	2
(United States) **J Sadri** (United States) **T Wilkison**	4	**7**	**6**

=== Bottom half ===
First round
6	(United States) **B Manson** (United States) **B Teacher**	**6**	**6**
(United States) T Garcia (Zimbabwe Rhodesia) H Ismail	4	3
(India) R Krishnan (United States) C B Strode	1	**6**	3
(West Germany) **R Gehring** (Colombia) **I Molina**	**6**	3	**6**
(United States) A Chandronnait (United States) T Hoehn	0	1
(Israel) **S Krulevitz** (United States) **H Solomon**	**6**	**6**
(United States) **M Cahill** (Spain) **J Higueras**	4	**7**	**7**
3	(United States) T Gullikson (Hungary) B Taróczy	**6**	6	5
7	(Australia) **R Case** (Chile) **J Fillol**	**6**	**6**
(United States) R Fagel (United States) D P Martin	1	4
(United States) **P Rennert** (United States) **N Saviano**	**6**	3	**6**
(United States) J Farrow (United States) L Stefanki	2	**6**	3
(United States) G Hardie (United States) T Waltke	4	2
(Argentina) **J L Clerc** (Argentina) **C Gattiker**	**6**	**6**
(Australia) P Kronk (Australia) C Letcher	5	3
2	(Romania) **I Țiriac** (Argentina) **G Vilas**	**7**	**6**

Second round
6	(United States) **B Manson** (United States) **B Teacher**	**6**	6	**6**
(West Germany) R Gehring (Colombia) I Molina	3	**7**	3
(Israel) S Krulevitz (United States) H Solomon	**6**	6	3
(United States) **M Cahill** (Spain) **J Higueras**	1	**7**	**6**
7	(Australia) **R Case** (Chile) **J Fillol**	2	**7**	**6**
(United States) P Rennert (United States) N Saviano	**6**	6	4
(Argentina) J L Clerc (Argentina) C Gattiker	5	5
2	(Romania) **I Țiriac** (Argentina) **G Vilas**	**7**	**7**

Quarterfinals
6	(United States) B Manson (United States) B Teacher	**7**	0	1
(United States) **M Cahill** (Spain) **J Higueras**	6	**6**	**6**
7	(Australia) R Case (Chile) J Fillol	3	2
2	(Romania) **I Țiriac** (Argentina) **G Vilas**	**6**	**6**

Semifinals
(United States) M Cahill (Spain) J Higueras	4	6
2	(Romania) **I Țiriac** (Argentina) **G Vilas**	**6**	**7**
