= 1981 Stowe Grand Prix =

- Date: August 10–16
- Edition: 4th
- Category: Grand Prix
- Draw: 32S / 16D
- Prize money: $75,000
- Surface: Hard / outdoor
- Location: Stowe, Vermont, U.S.
- Venue: Topnotch Inn

Champions

Singles
- (United States) Brian Gottfried

Doubles
- (South Africa) Johan Kriek / (United States) Larry Stefanki
← 1980 ·	Stowe Open	· 1982 →

The 1981 Stowe Grand Prix was a men's tennis tournament played on outdoor hard courts at the Topnotch Inn in Stowe, Vermont in the United States that was part of the 1981 Grand Prix circuit. It was the fourth edition of the tournament and was held from August 10 through August 16, 1981. Second-seeded Brian Gottfried won the singles title.

== Finals ==
=== Singles ===
(United States) Brian Gottfried defeated (United States) Tony Graham 6–3, 6–3

- It was Gottfried's 1st singles title of the year and the 22nd of his career.

=== Doubles ===
(South Africa) Johan Kriek / (United States) Larry Stefanki defeated (United States) Brian Gottfried / (United States) Bob Lutz 2–6, 6–1, 6–2
