= 1977 Volvo International – Doubles =

Doubles
- 1977 Volvo International

Final
- Champions: (United States) Brian Gottfried (Mexico) Raúl Ramírez
- Runners-up: (United States) Fred McNair (United States) Sherwood Stewart
- Score: 7–5, 6–3

Details
- Draw: 32
- Seeds: 8

Events
Singles	Doubles
- Volvo International

Brian Gottfried and Raúl Ramírez were the defending champions and won in the final 7–5, 6–3 against Fred McNair and Sherwood Stewart.

== Seeds ==
Champion seeds are indicated in bold text while text in italics indicates the round in which those seeds were eliminated.

1. (United States) **Brian Gottfried** / (Mexico) **Raúl Ramírez (champions)**
2. (United States) Robert Lutz / (United States) Stan Smith (quarterfinals)
3. (United States) Fred McNair / (United States) Sherwood Stewart (final)
4. (Egypt) Ismail El Shafei / (New Zealand) Brian Fairlie (quarterfinals)
5. (Australia) John Alexander / (Australia) Kim Warwick (semifinals)
6. (India) Anand Amritraj / (India) Vijay Amritraj (first round)
7. (Switzerland) Colin Dowdeswell / (Australia) Chris Kachel (semifinals)
8. (Australia) Mark Edmondson / (Australia) John Marks (first round)

== Draw ==
Key

- Q = Qualifier
- WC = Wild card
- LL = Lucky loser
- Alt = Alternate
- ITF = ITF entry
- PR = Protected ranking
- SR = Special ranking
- SE = Special exempt
- JE = Junior exempt
- JR = Junior Accelerator Programme entrant
- CO = College Accelerator Programme entrant
- NG = Next Gen Accelerator Program entrant
- w/o = Walkover
- r = Retired
- d = Defaulted

=== Final ===
Final
1	(United States) **Brian Gottfried** (Mexico) **Raúl Ramírez**	**7**	**6**
4	(United States) Fred McNair (United States) Sherwood Stewart	5	3

=== Top half ===
First round
1	(United States) **B Gottfried** (Mexico) **R Ramírez**	**6**	**6**
(France) J-F Caujolle (France) B Fritz	3	0
(United States) A Chandronnait (United States) J Wynn	3	4
(United States) **A Ashe** (United States) **T Wilkison**	**6**	**6**
(United States) D Crawford (United States) T Hoehn	0	6
(Australia) **J Newcombe** (Spain) **M Orantes**	**6**	**7**
(United States) **B Manson** (United States) **H Pfister**	**6**	**6**
8	(Australia) M Edmondson (Australia) J Marks	1	4
4	(Egypt) **I El Shafei** (New Zealand) **B Fairlie**	**6**	**6**
(South Africa) J Eagleton (South Africa) D Joubert	2	3
(Bolivia) R Benavides (Ecuador) R Ycaza	2	2
(West Germany) **F Gebert** (West Germany) **W Zirngibl**	**6**	**6**
(United States) **M Cahill** (United States) **T Moor**	**6**	**6**
(Sweden) J Norbäck (Sweden) D Palm	3	4
(United States) C Mayotte (United States) J Ratliff	3	**6**	4
5	(Australia) **J Alexander** (Australia) **K Warwick**	**6**	3	**6**

Second round
1	(United States) **B Gottfried** (Mexico) **R Ramírez**	**6**	**6**
(United States) A Ashe (United States) T Wilkison	1	4
(Australia) **J Newcombe** (Spain) **M Orantes**	**7**	5	**6**
(United States) B Manson (United States) H Pfister	6	**7**	4
4	(Egypt) **I El Shafei** (New Zealand) **B Fairlie**	**6**	**6**
(West Germany) F Gebert (West Germany) W Zirngibl	1	2
(United States) M Cahill (United States) T Moor	2	3
5	(Australia) **J Alexander** (Australia) **K Warwick**	**6**	**6**

Quarterfinals
1	(United States) **B Gottfried** (Mexico) **R Ramírez**	**6**	**6**
(Australia) J Newcombe (Spain) M Orantes	4	3
4	(Egypt) I El Shafei (New Zealand) B Fairlie	**6**	6	5
5	(Australia) **J Alexander** (Australia) **K Warwick**	3	**7**	**7**

Semifinals
1	(United States) **B Gottfried** (Mexico) **R Ramírez**	**6**	3	**7**
5	(Australia) J Alexander (Australia) K Warwick	4	**6**	6

=== Bottom half ===
First round
6	(India) A Amritraj (India) V Amritraj	4	6
(Canada) **G Halder** (Mexico) E Montaño	**6**	**7**
(Austria) **H Kary** (United States) **S Krulevitz**	**6**	**7**
(Australia) J Bartlett (South Africa) J Yuill	4	6
(Argentina) **L Álvarez** (Paraguay) **V Pecci**	**7**	**7**
(United States) J Geraghty (United States) T Mayotte	6	6
(United States) R Fagel (United States) Z Guerry	1	3
3	(United States) **F McNair** (United States) **S Stewart**	**6**	**6**
7	(Switzerland) **C Dowdeswell** (Australia) **C Kachel**	**6**	**6**
(United States) J Delaney (India) S Menon	2	2
(United States) **V Amaya** (United States) **T Waltke**	**6**	2	**6**
(United States) Tim Gullikson (United States) Tom Gullikson	3	**6**	3
(Colombia) **Á Betancur** (Colombia) **I Molina**	**6**	**7**
(United States) J C Hagey (United States) G Hardie	0	6
(United Kingdom) R Lewis (South Africa) W Prinsloo	2	2
2	(United States) **R Lutz** (United States) **S Smith**	**6**	**6**

Second round
(Canada) G Halder (Mexico) E Montaño	6	3
(Austria) **H Kary** (United States) **S Krulevitz**	**7**	**6**
(Argentina) L Álvarez (Paraguay) V Pecci	**6**	6	2
3	(United States) **F McNair** (United States) **S Stewart**	4	**7**	**6**
7	(Switzerland) **C Dowdeswell** (Australia) **C Kachel**	**6**	**6**
(United States) V Amaya (United States) T Waltke	2	3
(Colombia) Á Betancur (Colombia) I Molina	4	3
2	(United States) **R Lutz** (United States) **S Smith**	**6**	**6**

Quarterfinals
(Austria) H Kary (United States) S Krulevitz	**7**	2	4
3	(United States) **F McNair** (United States) **S Stewart**	5	**6**	**6**
7	(Switzerland) **C Dowdeswell** (Australia) **C Kachel**	4	**7**	**6**
2	(United States) R Lutz (United States) S Smith	**6**	6	4

Semifinals
3	(United States) **F McNair** (United States) **S Stewart**	**6**	**6**
7	(Switzerland) C Dowdeswell (Australia) C Kachel	1	4
