= 1982 Stowe Grand Prix =

- Date: August 17–22
- Edition: 5th
- Category: Grand Prix
- Draw: 32S / 16D
- Prize money: $75,000
- Surface: Hard / outdoor
- Location: Stowe, Vermont, U.S.
- Venue: Topnotch Inn

Champions

Singles
- (United States) Jay Lapidus

Doubles
- (United States) Andy Andrews / (United States) John Sadri
← 1981 ·	Stowe Open	· 1983 →

The 1982 Stowe Grand Prix was a men's tennis tournament played on outdoor hard courts at the Topnotch Inn in Stowe, Vermont in the United States that was part of the 1982 Grand Prix circuit. It was the fifth edition of the tournament and was held from August 17 through August 22, 1982. Unseeded Jay Lapidus won the singles title.

== Finals ==
=== Singles ===
(United States) Jay Lapidus defeated (United States) Eric Fromm 6–4, 6–2

- It was Lapidus' only singles title of his career.

=== Doubles ===
(United States) Andy Andrews / (United States) John Sadri defeated (United States) Eric Fromm/ (United States) Mike Fishbach 6–3, 6–4
