= 1979 Volvo International – Singles =

Singles
- 1979 Volvo International

Final
- Champion: (United States) Harold Solomon
- Runner-up: (Spain) José Higueras
- Score: 5–7, 6–4, 7–6

Details
- Draw: 64
- Seeds: 16

Events
Singles	Doubles
← 1978 ·	Volvo International	· 1980 →

Eddie Dibbs was the defending champion but lost in the semifinals to Harold Solomon.

Solomon won in the final 5–7, 6–4, 7–6 against José Higueras.

== Seeds ==
1. (United States) Jimmy Connors (second round, withdrew)
2. (United States) Roscoe Tanner (third round)
3. (Argentina) Guillermo Vilas (semifinals)
4. (United States) Harold Solomon (champion)
5. (United States) Eddie Dibbs (semifinals)
6. (Spain) José Higueras (final)
7. (Paraguay) Víctor Pecci (quarterfinals)
8. (Argentina) José Luis Clerc (quarterfinals)
9. (United States) Brian Gottfried (third round)
10. (Spain) Manuel Orantes (second round)
11. (United States) Tim Gullikson (second round)
12. (Australia) John Alexander (first round)
13. (Hungary) Balázs Taróczy (quarterfinals)
14. (United States) Brian Teacher (third round)
15. (Italy) Corrado Barazzutti (quarterfinals)
16. (South Africa) Johan Kriek (first round)

== Draw ==
=== Key ===
- Q = Qualifier
- WC = Wild card
- LL = Lucky loser
- Alt = Alternate
- SE = Special exempt
- PR = Protected ranking
- ITF = ITF entry
- JE = Junior exempt
- w/o = Walkover
- r = Retired
- d = Defaulted
- SR = Special ranking

=== Finals ===
Semifinals
5	(United States) Eddie Dibbs	6	3
4	(United States) Harold Solomon	7	6
3	(Argentina) Guillermo Vilas	2	1
6	(Spain) José Higueras	6	6

Final
4	(United States) Harold Solomon	5	6	7
6	(Spain) José Higueras	7	4	6

=== Top half ===
==== Section 1 ====
First round
1	(United States) J Connors	6	6
(United States) E Teltscher	2	4
(Paraguay) F González	6	6
(United States) D P Martin	1	3
(South Africa) J Yuill	4	3
(Colombia) I Molina	6	6
(India) R Krishnan	2	1
13	(Hungary) B Taróczy	6	6
16	(South Africa) J Kriek	5	3
(United States) N Saviano	7	6
(United States) A Kohlberg	2	6	6
(Australia) R Case	6	2	7
(United States) T Garcia	6	6
(Zimbabwe Rhodesia) H Ismail	3	4
(Ecuador) A Gómez	3	5
5	(United States) E Dibbs	6	7

Second round
1	(United States) J Connors
(Paraguay) F González	w/o
(Colombia) I Molina	3	3
13	(Hungary) B Taróczy	6	6
(United States) N Saviano	3	1
(Australia) R Case	6	6
(United States) T Garcia	3	5
5	(United States) E Dibbs	6	7

Third round
(Paraguay) F González	6	1
13	(Hungary) B Taróczy	7	6
(Australia) R Case	6	1	5
5	(United States) E Dibbs	2	6	7

Quarterfinals
13	(Hungary) B Taróczy	3	7	1
5	(United States) E Dibbs	6	5	6

==== Section 2 ====
First round
4	(United States) H Solomon	6	6
(Australia) J Bartlett	3	1
(United States) B Manson	6	6
(United States) A Chandronnait	1	1
(Mexico) R Ramírez	6	6
(United States) G Hardie	2	4
(Australia) J Marks	2	6	1
10	(Spain) M Orantes	6	3	6
12	(Australia) J Alexander	2	4
(Australia) P McNamara	6	6
(United States) B Maze	6	7
(Australia) M Edmondson	4	5
(Ecuador) R Ycaza	3	6	0
(United States) M Cahill	6	4	6
(Australia) W Maher	0	3
8	(Argentina) J L Clerc	6	6

Second round
4	(United States) H Solomon	7	4	6
(United States) B Manson	6	6	3
(Mexico) R Ramírez	6	6
10	(Spain) M Orantes	4	0
(Australia) P McNamara	6	6
(United States) B Maze	4	3
(United States) M Cahill	2	1
8	(Argentina) J L Clerc	6	6

Third round
4	(United States) H Solomon	6	6
(Mexico) R Ramírez	4	2
(Australia) P McNamara	2	6	3
8	(Argentina) J L Clerc	6	1	6

Quarterfinals
4	(United States) H Solomon	6	6
8	(Argentina) J L Clerc	3	1

=== Bottom half ===
==== Section 3 ====
First round
7	(Paraguay) V Pecci	6	6
(Sweden) J Norbäck	3	1
(Australia) P Dent	3	6	4
(United States) Tom Gullikson	6	3	6
(Australia) P Kronk	5	6	6
(United States) K Richardson	7	3	4
(United States) T Wilkison	6	3	0
14	(United States) B Teacher	3	6	6
11	(United States) Tim Gullikson	1	6	6
(New Zealand) R Simpson	6	3	1
(United States) R Fagel	6	0
(West Germany) R Gehring	7	6
Q	(United States) Z Guerry	1	2
(United States) B Walts	6	6
Q	(Chile) J Nunez	1	1
3	(Argentina) G Vilas	6	6

Second round
7	(Paraguay) V Pecci	7	6
(United States) Tom Gullikson	6	4
(Australia) P Kronk	4	3
14	(United States) B Teacher	6	6
11	(United States) Tim Gullikson	1	5
(West Germany) R Gehring	6	7
(United States) B Walts	3	6	1
3	(Argentina) G Vilas	6	3	6

Third round
7	(Paraguay) V Pecci	6	6
14	(United States) B Teacher	2	1
(West Germany) R Gehring	6	5	1
3	(Argentina) G Vilas	3	7	6

Quarterfinals
7	(Paraguay) V Pecci	4	0
3	(Argentina) G Vilas	6	6

==== Section 4 ====
First round
6	(Spain) J Higueras	6	6
(South Africa) D Joubert	1	0
(United States) T Mayotte	1	4
(United States) J Sadri	6	6
(Switzerland) C Dowdeswell	7	6
Q	(Iran) A Madani	6	0
(Chile) J Fillol	5	1
9	(United States) B Gottfried	7	6
15	(Italy) C Barazzutti	6	7
(United States) S Krulevitz	3	6
(United States) T Waltke	6	6
(New Zealand) C Lewis	3	2
Q	(United States) L Bourne	7	1	7
(Australia) A Gardiner	5	6	6
(United States) V Winitsky	1	5
2	(United States) R Tanner	6	7

Second round
6	(Spain) J Higueras	6	6
(United States) J Sadri	4	1
(Switzerland) C Dowdeswell	2	4
9	(United States) B Gottfried	6	6
15	(Italy) C Barazzutti	4	6	6
(United States) T Waltke	6	4	3
Q	(United States) L Bourne	3	6	4
2	(United States) R Tanner	6	4	6

Third round
6	(Spain) J Higueras	6	6
9	(United States) B Gottfried	1	1
15	(Italy) C Barazzutti	6	7	7
2	(United States) R Tanner	7	5	6

Quarterfinals
6	(Spain) J Higueras	6	4	6
15	(Italy) C Barazzutti	4	6	2
