= 1976 Volvo International – Singles =

Singles
- 1976 Volvo International

Final
- Champion: (United States) Jimmy Connors
- Runner-up: (Mexico) Raúl Ramírez
- Score: 7–6, 4–6, 6–3

Details
- Draw: 64
- Seeds: 8

Events
Singles	Doubles
← 1975 ·	Volvo International	· 1977 →

Jimmy Connors was the defending champion and won in the final 7–6, 4–6, 6–3 against Raúl Ramírez.

== Seeds ==
1. (United States) Jimmy Connors (champion)
2. (Spain) Manuel Orantes (quarterfinals)
3. (United States) Arthur Ashe (second round)
4. (Mexico) Raúl Ramírez (final)
5. (Australia) Ken Rosewall (third round)
6. (United States) Brian Gottfried (quarterfinals)
7. (United States) Eddie Dibbs (quarterfinals)
8. (New Zealand) Onny Parun (first round)

== Draw ==
=== Key ===
- Q = Qualifier
- WC = Wild card
- LL = Lucky loser
- Alt = Alternate
- SE = Special exempt
- PR = Protected ranking
- ITF = ITF entry
- JE = Junior exempt
- w/o = Walkover
- r = Retired
- d = Defaulted
- SR = Special ranking

=== Finals ===
Semifinals
1	(United States) Jimmy Connors	6	6	6
(Socialist Federal Republic of Yugoslavia) Željko Franulović	7	3	1
4	(Mexico) Raúl Ramírez	6	6
(United States) Cliff Richey	1	1

Final
1	(United States) Jimmy Connors	7	4	6
4	(Mexico) Raúl Ramírez	6	6	3

=== Top half ===
==== Section 1 ====
First round
1	(United States) J Connors	6	6
(United States) S Krulevitz	2	0
(South Africa) B Hewitt	5	4
(Austria) H Kary	7	6
(Rhodesia) C Dowdeswell	7	3	6
(Australia) G Masters	5	6	3
(United States) W Blocher	5	6
(Argentina) R Cano	7	7
(United Kingdom) B Mottram	6	6
(United States) G R Reid	2	1
(United States) P DuPré	6	6
(United States) E van Dillen	3	3
(Sweden) R Norberg	6	6	6
(Spain) A Muñoz	7	3	3
(United States) N Saviano	0	4
7	(United States) E Dibbs	6	6

Second round
1	(United States) J Connors	6	6
(Austria) H Kary	1	3
(Rhodesia) C Dowdeswell	5	2
(Argentina) R Cano	7	6
(United Kingdom) B Mottram	6	6
(United States) P DuPré	3	2
(Sweden) R Norberg	1	2
7	(United States) E Dibbs	6	6

Third round
1	(United States) J Connors	7	6
(Argentina) R Cano	6	0
(United Kingdom) B Mottram	6	5	6
7	(United States) E Dibbs	4	7	7

Quarterfinals
1	(United States) J Connors	7	7
7	(United States) E Dibbs	6	6

==== Section 2 ====
First round
3	(United States) A Ashe	6	6
(Australia) C Letcher	1	2
(Socialist Federal Republic of Yugoslavia) Ž Franulović	6	6
(United States) D P Martin	1	1
(Netherlands) R Thung	6	6	2
(Australia) B Phillips-Moore	7	1	6
(United States) D Crawford	6	4	1
(Australia) M Edmondson	3	6	6
(Poland) W Fibak	3	6	6
(United States) T Waltke	6	2	2
(Bolivia) R Benavides	5	3
(United States) S Turner	7	6
(United States) B Seewagen	4	7	6
(Colombia) Á Betancur	6	5	7
(United States) J Sadri	4	2
5	(Australia) K Rosewall	6	6

Second round
3	(United States) A Ashe	4	4
(Socialist Federal Republic of Yugoslavia) Ž Franulović	6	6
(Australia) B Phillips-Moore	3	4
(Australia) M Edmondson	6	6
(Poland) W Fibak	6	6
(United States) S Turner	3	4
(Colombia) Á Betancur	4	1
5	(Australia) K Rosewall	6	6

Third round
(Socialist Federal Republic of Yugoslavia) Ž Franulović	6	3	6
(Australia) M Edmondson	2	6	3
(Poland) W Fibak	6	6
5	(Australia) K Rosewall	3	4

Quarterfinals
(Socialist Federal Republic of Yugoslavia) Ž Franulović	6	6
(Poland) W Fibak	4	3

=== Bottom half ===
==== Section 3 ====
First round
6	(United States) B Gottfried	6	6
(United Kingdom) G Battrick	3	2
(Venezuela) J Andrew	6	6
(United States) B Webb	2	4
(South Africa) T Ryan	2	4
(Australia) J Marks	6	6
(United States) B Scanlon	4	1
(West Germany) K Meiler	6	6
(Australia) D Crealy	6	6	6
(Socialist Federal Republic of Yugoslavia) N Špear	3	7	1
(Japan) J Kuki	6	6
(Australia) C Kachel	3	4
(South Africa) P Cramer	4	3
(Colombia) J Velasco Sr.	6	6
(Australia) J Bartlett	0	3
4	(Mexico) R Ramírez	6	6

Second round
6	(United States) B Gottfried	7	6
(Venezuela) J Andrew	5	2
(Australia) J Marks	1	0
(West Germany) K Meiler	6	6
(Australia) D Crealy	5	6	6
(Japan) J Kuki	7	2	0
(Colombia) J Velasco Sr.	7	3	3
4	(Mexico) R Ramírez	6	6	6

Third round
6	(United States) B Gottfried	6	6
(West Germany) K Meiler	3	4
(Australia) D Crealy	1	6
4	(Mexico) R Ramírez	6	7

Quarterfinals
6	(United States) B Gottfried	1	6	2
4	(Mexico) R Ramírez	6	2	6

==== Section 4 ====
First round
8	(New Zealand) O Parun	2	1
(United States) C Richey	6	6
(United States) M Fishbach	1	1
(United States) G Mayer	6	6
(South Africa) R Moore	6	6
(Sweden) D Palm	2	2
(Brazil) J Rasgado	6	2	1
(Paraguay) V Pecci	4	6	6
(United States) P Fishbach	4	4
(Colombia) I Molina	6	6
(United States) N Holmes	6	3	3
(United States) J Borowiak	3	6	6
(Spain) J Gisbert Sr.	6	6
(United States) G Hardie	4	2
(United States) F Taygan	4	2
2	(Spain) M Orantes	6	6

Second round
(United States) C Richey	6	6
(United States) G Mayer	2	3
(South Africa) R Moore	5	2
(Paraguay) V Pecci	7	6
(Colombia) I Molina	2	7	6
(United States) J Borowiak	6	6	3
(Spain) J Gisbert Sr.	3	3
2	(Spain) M Orantes	6	6

Third round
(United States) C Richey	6	6
(Paraguay) V Pecci	3	3
(Colombia) I Molina	2	3
2	(Spain) M Orantes	6	6

Quarterfinals
(United States) C Richey	6	6
2	(Spain) M Orantes	2	3
