= 1976 Volvo International – Doubles =

Doubles
- 1976 Volvo International

Final
- Champions: (United States) Brian Gottfried (Mexico) Raúl Ramírez
- Runners-up: (Argentina) Ricardo Cano (Paraguay) Víctor Pecci
- Score: 6–3, 6–0

Details
- Draw: 31
- Seeds: 8

Events
Singles	Doubles
- Volvo International

Haroon Rahim and Erik van Dillen were the defending champions but only Van Dillen competed that year with Dick Crealy.

Crealy and Van Dillen lost in the quarterfinals to Brian Gottfried and Raúl Ramírez.

Gottfried and Ramírez won in the final 6–3, 6–0 against Ricardo Cano and Víctor Pecci.

== Seeds ==
1. (United States) Brian Gottfried / (Mexico) Raúl Ramírez (champions)
2. (Spain) Juan Gisbert, Sr. / (Spain) Manuel Orantes (first round)
3. (United States) Arthur Ashe / (United States) Jimmy Connors (quarterfinals)
4. (South Africa) Bob Hewitt / (Australia) Geoff Masters (semifinals)
5. n/a
6. (Argentina) Ricardo Cano / (Paraguay) Víctor Pecci (final)
7. (Poland) Wojciech Fibak / (West Germany) Karl Meiler (semifinals)
8. (Rhodesia) Colin Dowdeswell / (Australia) Chris Kachel (quarterfinals)

== Draw ==
Key

- Q = Qualifier
- WC = Wild card
- LL = Lucky loser
- Alt = Alternate
- ITF = ITF entry
- PR = Protected ranking
- SR = Special ranking
- SE = Special exempt
- JE = Junior exempt
- JR = Junior Accelerator Programme entrant
- CO = College Accelerator Programme entrant
- NG = Next Gen Accelerator Program entrant
- w/o = Walkover
- r = Retired
- d = Defaulted

=== Finals ===
Semifinals
1	(United States) Brian Gottfried (Mexico) Raúl Ramírez	7	3	6
4	(South Africa) Bob Hewitt (Australia) Geoff Masters	6	6	3
6	(Argentina) Ricardo Cano (Paraguay) Víctor Pecci	3	6	6
7	(Poland) Wojciech Fibak (West Germany) Karl Meiler	6	4	4

Final
1	(United States) Brian Gottfried (Mexico) Raúl Ramírez	6	6
6	(Argentina) Ricardo Cano (Paraguay) Víctor Pecci	3	0

=== Top half ===
First round
1	(United States) B Gottfried (Mexico) R Ramírez	6	7
(United States) G Mayer (United States) J Sadri	1	6
(Australia) D Golden; F Pascal	1	2
(Australia) J Bartlett (Australia) C Letcher	6	6
(United States) G R Reid (Netherlands) R Thung	6	6	6
(Sweden) J Norbäck (Sweden) D Palm	4	7	7
8	(Rhodesia) C Dowdeswell (Australia) C Kachel	7	6
(United States) W Blocher (South Africa) P Cramer	5	3
(Austria) H Kary (United Kingdom) B Mottram	6	6
(Japan) J Kuki (United States) B Scanlon	3	4
(United Kingdom) G Battrick (United States) G Holmes	DEF
(United States) P DuPré (United States) G Hardie
(Socialist Federal Republic of Yugoslavia) Ž Franulović (New Zealand) O Parun	6	4	4
4	(South Africa) B Hewitt (Australia) G Masters	3	6	6

Second round
1	(United States) B Gottfried (Mexico) R Ramírez	7	6
(Australia) J Bartlett (Australia) C Letcher	6	2
(Sweden) J Norbäck (Sweden) D Palm	5	6
(Australia) D Crealy (United States) E van Dillen	7	7
8	(Rhodesia) C Dowdeswell (Australia) C Kachel	6	6
(Austria) H Kary (United Kingdom) B Mottram	2	3
(United Kingdom) G Battrick (United States) G Holmes	1	4
4	(South Africa) B Hewitt (Australia) G Masters	6	6

Quarterfinals
1	(United States) B Gottfried (Mexico) R Ramírez	6	7
(Australia) D Crealy (United States) E van Dillen	1	6
8	(Rhodesia) C Dowdeswell (Australia) C Kachel	4	6	4
4	(South Africa) B Hewitt (Australia) G Masters	6	1	6

Semifinals
1	(United States) B Gottfried (Mexico) R Ramírez	7	3	6
4	(South Africa) B Hewitt (Australia) G Masters	6	6	3

=== Bottom half ===
First round
3	(United States) A Ashe (United States) J Connors	4	6	6
(United States) J Borowiak (Sweden) R Norberg	6	3	2
(United States) P Fishbach (South Africa) R Moore	4	6	6
(Venezuela) J Andrew (Bolivia) R Benavides	6	4	3
(United States) F Taygan (United States) T Waltke	6	6
(United States) A Chandronnait (South Africa) T Ryan	2	3
(United States) D Crawford (United States) S Turner	1	5
6	(Argentina) R Cano (Paraguay) V Pecci	6	7
7	(Poland) W Fibak (West Germany) K Meiler	6	6
(United States) M Fishbach (United States) S Mayer	2	2
(Australia) B Phillips-Moore (Socialist Federal Republic of Yugoslavia) N Špear	4	7	6
(Colombia) Á Betancur (Brazil) J Rasgado	6	5	3
(Colombia) I Molina (Colombia) N Velasco	6	6
(United States) B Martin (United States) N Saviano	1	3
(Australia) M Edmondson (Australia) J Marks	6	6
2	(Spain) J Gisbert, Sr. (Spain) M Orantes	4	4

Second round
3	(United States) A Ashe (United States) J Connors	7	7
(United States) P Fishbach (South Africa) R Moore	6	5
(United States) F Taygan (United States) T Waltke	4	1
6	(Argentina) R Cano (Paraguay) V Pecci	6	6
7	(Poland) W Fibak (West Germany) K Meiler	6	6
(Australia) B Phillips-Moore (Socialist Federal Republic of Yugoslavia) N Špear	2	2
(Colombia) I Molina (Colombia) N Velasco	1	2
(Australia) M Edmondson (Australia) J Marks	6	6

Quarterfinals
3	(United States) A Ashe (United States) J Connors	6	6	4
6	(Argentina) R Cano (Paraguay) V Pecci	7	1	6
7	(Poland) W Fibak (West Germany) K Meiler	7	6
(Australia) M Edmondson (Australia) J Marks	5	4

Semifinals
6	(Argentina) R Cano (Paraguay) V Pecci	3	6	6
7	(Poland) W Fibak (West Germany) K Meiler	6	4	4
