= 1979 English Leather Grand Prix =

- Date: August 13–19
- Edition: 2nd
- Category: Grand Prix
- Draw: 32S / 16D
- Prize money: $75,000
- Surface: Hard / outdoor
- Location: Stowe, Vermont, U.S.
- Venue: Topnotch Inn

Champions

Singles
- (United States) Jimmy Connors

Doubles
- (United States) Mike Cahill / (United States) Steve Krulevitz
← 1978 ·	Stowe Open	· 1980 →

The 1979 English Leather Grand Prix, also known as the Stowe Tennis Grand Prix, was a men's tennis tournament played on outdoor hard courts at the Topnotch Inn in Stowe, Vermont in the United States that was part of the 1979 Grand Prix circuit. It was the second edition of the tournament and was held from August 13 through August 19, 1979. First-seeded Jimmy Connors won his second consecutive singles title at the event.

== Finals ==
=== Singles ===
(United States) Jimmy Connors defeated (United States) Mike Cahill 6–0, 6–1

- It was Connors' 6th singles title of the year and the 77th of his career.

=== Doubles ===
(United States) Mike Cahill / (United States) Steve Krulevitz defeated (India) Anand Amritraj/ (Australia) Colin Dibley 3–6, 6–3, 6–4
