= 1980 Volvo International – Singles =

Singles
- 1980 Volvo International

Final
- Champion: (United States) Jimmy Connors
- Runner-up: (United States) Eddie Dibbs
- Score: 6–3, 5–7, 6–1

Details
- Draw: 64
- Seeds: 16

Events
Singles	Doubles
← 1979 ·	Volvo International	· 1981 →

Harold Solomon was the defending champion but lost in the semifinals to Eddie Dibbs.

Jimmy Connors won in the final 6–3, 5–7, 6–1 against Dibbs.

== Seeds ==
A champion seed is indicated in bold text while text in italics indicates the round in which that seed was eliminated.

1. (United States) **Jimmy Connors (champion)**
2. (United States) Harold Solomon (semifinals)
3. (United States) Eddie Dibbs (final)
4. (Czechoslovakia) Ivan Lendl (semifinals)
5. (United States) Roscoe Tanner (first round)
6. (Spain) José Higueras (third round)
7. (France) Yannick Noah (third round)
8. (Poland) Wojciech Fibak (quarterfinals)
9. (United States) Brian Gottfried (third round)
10. (Chile) Hans Gildemeister (third round)
11. n/a
12. (United States) Eliot Teltscher (quarterfinals)
13. (United States) Pat DuPré (quarterfinals)
14. (Paraguay) Víctor Pecci (first round)
15. (United States) Bill Scanlon (first round)
16. (South Africa) Johan Kriek (first round)

== Draw ==
=== Key ===
- Q = Qualifier
- WC = Wild card
- LL = Lucky loser
- Alt = Alternate
- SE = Special exempt
- PR = Protected ranking
- ITF = ITF entry
- JE = Junior exempt
- w/o = Walkover
- r = Retired
- d = Defaulted
- SR = Special ranking

=== Finals ===
Semifinals
1	(United States) **Jimmy Connors**	**6**	**6**
4	(Czechoslovakia) Ivan Lendl	4	2
3	(United States) **Eddie Dibbs**	**6**	**6**
2	(United States) Harold Solomon	4	0

Final
1	(United States) **Jimmy Connors**	**6**	5	**6**
3	(United States) Eddie Dibbs	3	**7**	1

=== Top half ===
==== Section 1 ====
First round
1	(United States) **J Connors**	**6**	**6**
(Brazil) J Soares	2	4
(Sweden) **P Hjertquist**	**6**	**6**
(Australia) G Masters	4	2
(Sweden) **S Simonsson**	**6**	3	**6**
(United States) B Manson	4	**6**	3
(Australia) B Drewett	2	1
LL	(United States) **T Garcia**	**6**	**6**
13	(United States) **P DuPré**	5	**7**	**6**
(Argentina) G Aubone	**7**	5	3
(Spain) **F Luna**	**6**	3	**6**
(Czechoslovakia) S Birner	1	**6**	4
(United States) **G Hardie**	3	**7**	**7**
(United States) J Delaney	**6**	6	5
(United States) **H Pfister**	6	**7**	**7**
5	(United States) R Tanner	**7**	6	5

Second round
1	(United States) **J Connors**	**6**	**6**
(Sweden) P Hjertquist	2	2
(Sweden) **S Simonsson**	**6**	**6**
LL	(United States) T Garcia	1	3
13	(United States) **P DuPré**	**6**	3	**6**
(Spain) F Luna	3	**6**	4
(United States) **G Hardie**	**7**	**6**
(United States) H Pfister	6	2

Third round
1	(United States) **J Connors**	**7**	**6**
(Sweden) S Simonsson	6	0
13	(United States) **P DuPré**	**6**	**6**
(United States) G Hardie	0	1

Quarterfinals
1	(United States) **J Connors**	**7**	**6**
13	(United States) P DuPré	6	0

==== Section 2 ====
First round
4	(Czechoslovakia) **I Lendl**	**6**	**6**
(Spain) R Vizcaino	3	0
(Ecuador) **A Gómez**	**6**	**6**
(Australia) M Edmondson	3	3
(United States) **M Grant**	1	**6**	**6**
(United Kingdom) J Feaver	**6**	2	1
(Zimbabwe) **A Pattison**	**6**	**6**
15	(United States) B Scanlon	3	3
9	(United States) **B Gottfried**	**6**	**6**
(Spain) G Urpí	1	4
(United States) **M Purcell**	**6**	**6**
(Bolivia) M Martinez	2	2
(United States) **B Nealon**	1	**6**	**6**
(United States) T Gullikson	**6**	2	1
(Ecuador) R Viver	2	1
8	(Poland) **W Fibak**	**6**	**6**

Second round
4	(Czechoslovakia) **I Lendl**	**7**	**6**
(Ecuador) A Gómez	6	3
(United States) **M Grant**	**6**	4	**6**
(Zimbabwe) A Pattison	2	**6**	2
9	(United States) **B Gottfried**	**6**	**6**
(United States) M Purcell	3	3
(United States) B Nealon	4	0
8	(Poland) **W Fibak**	**6**	**6**

Third round
4	(Czechoslovakia) **I Lendl**	**6**	**6**
(United States) M Grant	2	2
9	(United States) B Gottfried	2	**6**	3
8	(Poland) **W Fibak**	**6**	1	**6**

Quarterfinals
4	(Czechoslovakia) **I Lendl**	3	**6**	**6**
8	(Poland) W Fibak	**6**	4	3

=== Bottom half ===
==== Section 3 ====
First round
7	(France) **Y Noah**	**6**	**6**
(United States) C Owens	4	2
(United States) **M Cahill**	**6**	**6**
(South Africa) J Yuill	3	2
(United States) **A Kohlberg**	**6**	**6**
(United States) M Shore	3	2
(Paraguay) F González	2	1
12	(United States) **E Teltscher**	**6**	**6**
16	(South Africa) J Kriek	5	6
(West Germany) **K Eberhard**	**7**	**7**
(United States) **R Fagel**	**6**	**6**
(Sweden) J Norbäck	2	2
(Australia) **R Case**	**7**	4	**6**
(United States) J Arias	6	**6**	1
(United States) T Cain	4	2
3	(United States) **E Dibbs**	**6**	**6**

Second round
7	(France) **Y Noah**	**6**	4	**6**
(United States) M Cahill	3	**6**	4
(United States) A Kohlberg	2	4
12	(United States) **E Teltscher**	**6**	**6**
(West Germany) **K Eberhard**	**7**	**7**
(United States) R Fagel	5	6
(Australia) R Case	**6**	1	3
3	(United States) **E Dibbs**	3	**6**	**6**

Third round
7	(France) Y Noah	3	4
12	(United States) **E Teltscher**	**6**	**6**
(West Germany) K Eberhard	3	2
3	(United States) **E Dibbs**	**6**	**6**

Quarterfinals
12	(United States) E Teltscher	2	4
3	(United States) **E Dibbs**	**6**	**6**

==== Section 4 ====
First round
6	(Spain) **J Higueras**	**6**	**6**
(Australia) P Dent	1	2
(United States) **B Martin**	**7**	**7**
(Finland) L Palin	6	6
(United States) **T Moor**	**6**	3
(United States) H Schoenfield	3	0^{r}
(Australia) **K Warwick**	3	**6**	**6**
14	(Paraguay) V Pecci	**6**	4	1
10	(Chile) **H Gildemeister**	**6**	**7**
(West Germany) R Gehring	4	6
(Socialist Federal Republic of Yugoslavia) **Ž Franulović**	6	**6**	**6**
(United States) G Petrovic	**7**	1	1
(Chile) **B Prajoux**	**6**	**7**
(United States) M Hunter	0	5
(India) S Menon	1	5
2	(United States) **H Solomon**	**6**	**7**

Second round
6	(Spain) **J Higueras**	**6**	**6**
(United States) B Martin	3	3
(United States) **T Moor**	**6**	**6**
(Australia) K Warwick	1	3
10	(Chile) **H Gildemeister**	**6**	6	**6**
(Socialist Federal Republic of Yugoslavia) Ž Franulović	0	**7**	4
(Chile) B Prajoux	6	2
2	(United States) **H Solomon**	**7**	**6**

Third round
6	(Spain) J Higueras	4	4
(United States) **T Moor**	**6**	**6**
10	(Chile) H Gildemeister	0	3
2	(United States) **H Solomon**	**6**	**6**

Quarterfinals
(United States) T Moor	6	2
2	(United States) **H Solomon**	**7**	**6**
