= 1980 Volvo International =

- Date: July 27 – August 3
- Edition: 8th
- Category: Grand Prix circuit
- Draw: 64S / 32D
- Prize money: $175,000
- Surface: Clay / outdoor
- Location: North Conway, NH, U.S.

Champions

Singles
- (United States) Jimmy Connors

Doubles
- (United States) Jimmy Connors / (United States) Brian Gottfried
- Volvo International

The 1980 Volvo International was a men's tennis tournament played on outdoor clay courts in North Conway, New Hampshire in the United States and was part of the 1980 Volvo Grand Prix. The tournament was held from July 27 through August 3, 1980. Jimmy Connors won the singles title.

== Finals ==
=== Singles ===
(United States) Jimmy Connors defeated (United States) Eddie Dibbs 6–3, 5–7, 6–1

- It was Connors' 4th singles title of the year and the 83rd of his career.

=== Doubles ===
(United States) Jimmy Connors / (United States) Brian Gottfried defeated (South Africa) Kevin Curren / (United States) Steve Denton 7–6, 6–2

- It was Connors' 5th title of the year and the 82nd of his career. It was Gottfried's 6th title of the year and the 64th of his career.
