= 1980 Volvo International – Doubles =

Doubles
- 1980 Volvo International
- 1979 Champions: (Romania) Ion Țiriac (Argentina) Guillermo Vilas

Final
- Champions: (United States) Jimmy Connors (United States) Brian Gottfried
- Runners-up: (South Africa) Kevin Curren (United States) Steve Denton
- Score: 7–6, 6–2

Details
- Draw: 32
- Seeds: 8

Events
Singles	Doubles
← 1979 ·	Volvo International	· 1981 →

Ion Țiriac and Guillermo Vilas were the defending champions but did not compete that year.

Jimmy Connors and Brian Gottfried won in the final 7–6, 6–2 against Kevin Curren and Steve Denton.

== Seeds ==
Champion seeds are indicated in bold text while text in italics indicates the round in which those seeds were eliminated.

1. (Poland) Wojciech Fibak / (Czechoslovakia) Ivan Lendl (quarterfinals)
2. (Chile) Hans Gildemeister / (Ecuador) Andrés Gómez (first round)
3. (United States) Pat DuPré / (United States) Hank Pfister (semifinals)
4. (Australia) Mark Edmondson / (Australia) Kim Warwick (quarterfinals)
5. (United States) Mike Cahill / (United States) Bruce Manson (first round)
6. (South Africa) Kevin Curren / (United States) Steve Denton (final)
7. (United States) Terry Moor / (United States) Eliot Teltscher (first round)
8. (Australia) Ross Case / (Australia) Geoff Masters (second round)

== Draw ==
=== Key ===
- Q = Qualifier
- WC = Wild card
- LL = Lucky loser
- Alt = Alternate
- SE = Special exempt
- PR = Protected ranking
- ITF = ITF entry
- JE = Junior exempt
- w/o = Walkover
- r = Retired
- d = Defaulted
- SR = Special ranking

=== Final ===
Final
6	(South Africa) Kevin Curren (United States) Steve Denton	6	2
	(United States) **Jimmy Connors** (United States) **Brian Gottfried**	**7**	**6**

=== Top half ===
First round
1	(Poland) **W Fibak** (Czechoslovakia) **I Lendl**	**6**	**6**
(Spain) G Urpí (Ecuador) R Viver	1	2
(Spain) **F Luna** (Spain) **R Vizcaíno**	**6**	3	**6**
(Argentina) G Aubone (Sweden) J Norbäck	4	**6**	1
(Paraguay) **F González** (Chile) **B Prajoux**	**6**	**6**
(United States) C Owens (United States) M Shore	3	2
(United States) A Kohlberg (United States) B Scanlon	6	**6**	3
6	(South Africa) **K Curren** (United States) **S Denton**	**7**	4	**6**
3	(United States) **P DuPré** (United States) **H Pfister**	6	**7**	**6**
(United States) J Delaney (United States) M Leach	**7**	5	3
(Sweden) **P Hjertquist** (Sweden) **S Simonsson**	**7**	**6**
(United States) R Fagel (Brazil) J Soares	5	2
(United States) **J Arias** (United States) **R Hightower**	**7**	3	**7**
(Australia) J Bartlett (United States) R Hubbard	6	**6**	5
(United States) T Cain (Finland) L Palin	2	3
8	(Australia) **R Case** (Australia) **G Masters**	**6**	**6**

Second round
1	(Poland) **W Fibak** (Czechoslovakia) **I Lendl**	4	**6**	**7**
(Spain) F Luna (Spain) R Vizcaíno	**6**	3	6
(Paraguay) F González (Chile) B Prajoux	3	4
6	(South Africa) **K Curren** (United States) **S Denton**	**6**	**6**
3	(United States) **P DuPré** (United States) **H Pfister**	**7**	**6**
(Sweden) P Hjertquist (Sweden) S Simonsson	5	1
(United States) **J Arias** (United States) **R Hightower**	**6**	2	**6**
8	(Australia) R Case (Australia) G Masters	4	**6**	3

Quarterfinals
1	(Poland) W Fibak (Czechoslovakia) I Lendl	4	**7**	5
6	(South Africa) **K Curren** (United States) **S Denton**	**6**	6	**7**
3	(United States) **P DuPré** (United States) **H Pfister**	**6**	**6**
(United States) J Arias (United States) R Hightower	3	1

Semifinals
6	(South Africa) **K Curren** (United States) **S Denton**	**6**	**6**
3	(United States) P DuPré (United States) H Pfister	3	3

=== Bottom half ===
First round
5	(United States) M Cahill (United States) B Manson	6	**6**	6
(Australia) **P Dent** (South Africa) **J Kriek**	**7**	3	**7**
(United Kingdom) **J Feaver** (South Africa) **J Yuill**	4	**6**	**6**
(United States) T Garcia (United States) M Grant	**6**	4	1
(United States) **C Dunk** (United States) **B Nealon**	2	**6**	**6**
(United States) J Geraghty (United States) D Hopper	**6**	3	4
(United States) G Hardie (United States) B Martin	3	**7**	3
4	(Australia) **M Edmondson** (Australia) **K Warwick**	**6**	6	**6**
7	(United States) T Moor (United States) E Teltscher	**6**	5	3
(United States) **T Gullikson** (Zimbabwe) **A Pattison**	4	**7**	**6**
(United States) **T Delatte** (United States) **M Purcell**	**6**	**6**
(United States) G Petrovic (United States) C Stansbury	3	4
(Socialist Federal Republic of Yugoslavia) **Ž Franulović** (Spain) **J Higueras**	**6**	**6**
(Czechoslovakia) S Birner (Australia) B Drewett	4	2
(United States) **J Connors** (United States) **B Gottfried**	3	**6**	**6**
2	(Chile) H Gildemeister (Ecuador) A Gómez	**6**	4	1

Second round
(Australia) **P Dent** (South Africa) **J Kriek**	**6**	**7**
(United Kingdom) J Feaver (South Africa) J Yuill	3	6
(United States) C Dunk (United States) B Nealon	3	1
4	(Australia) **M Edmondson** (Australia) **K Warwick**	**6**	**6**
(United States) **T Gullikson** (Zimbabwe) **A Pattison**	**7**	3	**7**
(United States) T Delatte (United States) M Purcell	6	**6**	5
(Socialist Federal Republic of Yugoslavia) Ž Franulović (Spain) J Higueras	6	**6**	2
(United States) **J Connors** (United States) **B Gottfried**	**7**	3	**6**

Quarterfinals
(Australia) **P Dent** (South Africa) **J Kriek**	**6**	**6**
4	(Australia) M Edmondson (Australia) K Warwick	4	1
(United States) T Gullikson (Zimbabwe) A Pattison	0	4
(United States) **J Connors** (United States) **B Gottfried**	**6**	**6**

Semifinals
(Australia) P Dent (South Africa) J Kriek	6	2
(United States) **J Connors** (United States) **B Gottfried**	**7**	**6**
