= 1983 Head Classic =

- Date: August 15–21
- Edition: 6th
- Category: Grand Prix
- Draw: 32S / 16D
- Prize money: $75,000
- Surface: Hard / outdoor
- Location: Stowe, Vermont, U.S.
- Venue: Topnotch Inn

Champions

Singles
- (Australia) John Fitzgerald

Doubles
- (Australia) Kim Warwick / (Australia) Brad Drewett
← 1982 ·	Stowe Open

The 1983 Head Classic was a men's tennis tournament played on outdoor hard courts at the Topnotch Inn in Stowe, Vermont in the United States that was part of the 1983 Grand Prix circuit. It was the sixth edition of the tournament and was held from August 15 through August 21, 1983. Fourth-seeded John Fitzgerald won the singles title.

== Finals ==
=== Singles ===
(Australia) John Fitzgerald defeated (India) Vijay Amritraj 3–6, 6–2, 7–5

- It was Fitzgerald's 2nd singles title of the year and the 4th of his career.

=== Doubles ===
(Australia) Kim Warwick / (Australia) Brad Drewett defeated (United States) Fritz Buehning / (United States) Tom Gullikson 4–6, 7–5, 6–2
