= 1976 Volvo International =

Tennis tournament

- Date: August 1–8
- Edition: 4th
- Category: Grand Prix circuit (Three star)
- Draw: 64S / 32D
- Prize money: $100,000
- Surface: Clay / outdoor
- Location: North Conway, U.S.

Champions

Singles
- (United States) Jimmy Connors

Doubles
- (United States) Brian Gottfried / (Mexico) Raúl Ramírez
- Volvo International

The 1976 Volvo International was a men's tennis tournament played on outdoor clay courts in North Conway, New Hampshire in the United States and was part of the 1976 Commercial Union Assurance Grand Prix circuit. It was the fourth edition of the tournament and was held from August 1 through August 8, 1976. First-seeded Jimmy Connors won the singles title and the accompanying $10,000 first-prize money. Due to persistent rainfall that preceded the arrival of Hurricane Belle the final was moved to the indoor courts at Algonquin Tennis Center.

== Finals ==
=== Singles ===
(United States) Jimmy Connors defeated (Mexico) Raúl Ramírez 7–6, 4–6, 6–3

- It was Connors' 9th title of the year and the 63rd of his career.

=== Doubles ===
(United States) Brian Gottfried / (Mexico) Raúl Ramírez defeated (Argentina) Ricardo Cano / (Paraguay) Víctor Pecci 6–3, 6–0

- It was Gottfried's 10th title of the year and the 33rd of his career. It was Ramírez's 15th title of the year and the 42nd of his career.
