= 1978 English Leather Grand Prix =

- Date: August 14–20
- Edition: 1st
- Category: Grand Prix
- Draw: 32S / 16D
- Prize money: $75,000
- Surface: Hard / outdoor
- Location: Stowe, Vermont, U.S.
- Venue: Topnotch Inn

Champions

Singles
- (United States) Jimmy Connors

Doubles
- (United States) Tom Gullikson / (United States) Tim Gullikson
Stowe Open	· 1979 →

The 1978 English Leather Grand Prix, also known as the Stowe Tennis Grand Prix, was a men's tennis tournament played on outdoor hard courts at the Topnotch Inn in Stowe, Vermont in the United States that was part of the 1978 Grand Prix circuit. It was the inaugural edition of the tournament and was held from August 14 through August 20, 1978. First-seeded Jimmy Connors won the singles title.

== Finals ==
=== Singles ===
(United States) Jimmy Connors defeated (United States) Tim Gullikson 5–7, 6–3, 6–2

- It was Connors' 8th singles title of the year and the 69th of his career.

=== Doubles ===
(United States) Tom Gullikson / (United States) Tim Gullikson defeated (Australia) Mark Edmondson/ (Australia) Kim Warwick 3–6, 7–6, 6–3
