= 1980 Stowe Grand Prix =

- Date: August 11–17
- Edition: 3rd
- Category: Grand Prix
- Draw: 32S / 16D
- Prize money: $75,000
- Surface: Hard / outdoor
- Location: Stowe, Vermont, U.S.
- Venue: Topnotch Inn

Champions

Singles
- (United States) Bob Lutz

Doubles
- (United States) Bob Lutz / (South Africa) Bernard Mitton
| ← 1979 · | Stowe Open | · 1981 → |

The 1980 Stowe Grand Prix was a men's tennis tournament played on outdoor hard courts at the Topnotch Inn in Stowe, Vermont in the United States that was part of the 1980 Grand Prix circuit. It was the third edition of the tournament and was held from August 11 through August 17, 1980. Unseeded Bob Lutz won the singles title.

== Finals ==
=== Singles ===
(United States) Bob Lutz defeated (South Africa) Johan Kriek 6–3, 6–1

- It was Lutz' 2nd singles title of the year and the 8th of his career.

=== Doubles ===
(United States) Bob Lutz / (South Africa) Bernard Mitton defeated (Romania) Ilie Năstase/ (United States) Ferdi Taygan 6–4, 6–3
