= Napa Open =

Defunct tennis tournament
- Event name: Napa Open
- Tour: Grand Prix circuit
- Founded: 1981
- Abolished: 1981
- Editions: 1
- Location: Napa, California, US
- Surface: Hard / outdoor

The Napa Open is a defunct tennis tournament that was played on the Grand Prix tennis circuit in 1981. The event was held in Napa, California and was played on outdoor hard courts. Sammy Giammalva, Jr. won the singles title while Chris Mayotte and Richard Meyer partnered to win the doubles title.

== Finals ==
=== Singles ===
Year	Champions	Runners-up	Score
1981	(United States) Sammy Giammalva, Jr.	(United States) Scott Davis	6–3, 5–7, 6–1

=== Doubles ===
Year	Champions	Runners-up	Score
1981	(United States) Chris Mayotte (United States) Richard Meyer	(United States) Tracy Delatte (United States) John Hayes	6–3, 3–6, 7–6
