= 1977 Volvo International =

- Date: July 31 – August 7
- Edition: 5th
- Category: Grand Prix
- Draw: 64S / 32D
- Prize money: $125,000
- Surface: Clay / outdoor
- Location: North Conway, New Hampshire, U.S.

Champions

Singles
- (Australia) John Alexander

Doubles
- (United States) Brian Gottfried / (Mexico) Raúl Ramírez
- Volvo International

The 1977 Volvo International was a men's tennis tournament played on outdoor clay courts in North Conway, New Hampshire in the United States and was part of the 1977 Colgate-Palmolive Grand Prix. It was the fifth edition of the tournament and was held from July 31 through August 7, 1977. Unseeded John Alexander won the singles title.

== Finals ==
=== Singles ===
(Australia) John Alexander defeated (Spain) Manuel Orantes 2–6, 6–4, 6–4

- It was Alexander's 4th title of the year and the 23rd of his career.

=== Doubles ===
(United States) Brian Gottfried / (Mexico) Raúl Ramírez defeated (United States) Fred McNair / (United States) Sherwood Stewart 7–5, 6–3

- It was Gottfried's 8th title of the year and the 46th of his career. It was Ramírez's 7th title of the year and the 54th of his career.
