= 1978 Volvo International =

Tennis tournament

- Date: July 31 – August 6
- Edition: 6th
- Category: Grand Prix
- Draw: 48S / 24D
- Prize money: $175,000
- Surface: Clay / outdoor
- Location: North Conway, NH, U.S.
- Venue: Mt. Cranmore Stadium

Champions

Singles
- (United States) Eddie Dibbs

Doubles
- (United Kingdom) Robin Drysdale / (United States) Van Winitsky
- Volvo International

The 1978 Volvo International was a men's tennis tournament played on outdoor clay courts at the Mt. Cranmore Stadium in North Conway, New Hampshire in the United States that was part of the 1978 Colgate-Palmolive Grand Prix. It was the sixth edition of the tournament was held from July 31 through August 6, 1978. First-seeded Eddie Dibbs won the singles title.

== Finals ==
=== Singles ===
(United States) Eddie Dibbs defeated (Australia) John Alexander 6–4, 6–4

- It was Dibbs' 4th title of the year and the 18th of his career.

=== Doubles ===
(United Kingdom) Robin Drysdale / (United States) Van Winitsky defeated (United States) Mike Fishbach / (South Africa) Bernard Mitton 6–3, 6–4

- It was Drysdale's only title of the year and the 1st of his career. It was Winitsky's 2nd title of the year and the 2nd of his career.
