= 1979 Volvo International =

- Date: July 30 – August 5
- Edition: 7th
- Category: Grand Prix circuit
- Draw: 64S / 32D
- Prize money: $175,000
- Surface: Clay / outdoor
- Location: North Conway, New Hampshire, U.S.

Champions

Singles
- (United States) Harold Solomon

Doubles
- (Romania) Ion Țiriac / (Argentina) Guillermo Vilas
- Volvo International

The 1979 Volvo International was a men's professional tennis tournament played on outdoor clay courts in North Conway, New Hampshire in the United States and was part of the 1979 Colgate-Palmolive Grand Prix. It was the 7th edition of the tournament and was held from July 30 through August 5, 1979. Fourth-seeded Harold Solomon won the singles title.

== Finals ==
=== Singles ===
(United States) Harold Solomon defeated (Spain) José Higueras 5–7, 6–4, 7–6

- It was Solomon's 2nd title of the year and the 18th of his career.

=== Doubles ===
(Romania) Ion Țiriac / (Argentina) Guillermo Vilas defeated (United States) John Sadri / (United States) Tim Wilkison 6–4, 7–6

- It was Țiriac's 2nd title of the year and the 22nd of his career. It was Vilas' 4th title of the year and the 60th of his career.
