= Greg Halder =

Canadian tennis player

- Country (sports): Canada
- Born: December 5, 1955 (age 70) Toronto, Ontario, Canada
- Height: 6 ft 2 in (188 cm)
- Plays: Right-handed

Singles
- Career record: 8–27

Grand Slam singles results
- Wimbledon: 1R (1978)
- US Open: 1R (1978)

Doubles
- Career record: 6–24

Grand Slam doubles results
- French Open: 2R (1977)
- Wimbledon: 1R (1978)

Greg Halder (born December 5, 1955) is a Canadian former professional tennis player.

Born and raised in Toronto, Halder is the son of ice hockey player Wally Halder, who was a member of the gold medal-winning team at the 1948 Winter Olympics. He turned professional in 1974. At the 1977 Volvo International in North Conway he had an upset win over world number five Raul Ramirez. In 1978 he featured in the singles main draws of the Wimbledon Championships and US Open. He represented Canada in two Davis Cup ties during his career.

== See also ==
- List of Canada Davis Cup team representatives
