= John Hayes (tennis) =

American tennis player

- Country (sports): United States
- Residence: Cos Cob, Connecticut
- Born: April 7, 1955 (age 69); Panama Canal Zone
- Height: 6 ft 4 in (1.93 m)
- Turned pro: Right-handed
- Plays: 1977

Singles
- Career record: 15–28
- Career titles: 0
- Highest ranking: No. 92 (December 22, 1980)

Grand Slam singles results
- US Open: 2R (1980)

Doubles
- Career record: 13–33
- Career titles: 0
- Highest ranking: No. 281 (January 3, 1983)

Grand Slam doubles results
- US Open: 2R (1980)

John Hayes (born April 7, 1955) is a former professional tennis player from the United States.

== Career ==
Hayes had a five set win over John James in the opening round of the 1980 US Open, before losing in the second round to Guillermo Vilas. In his two other US Open main singles draw appearances, in 1981 and 1984, Hayes failed to get past the first round.

Hayes was a doubles runner-up, with Tracy Delatte, at the 1981 Napa Open. He also made the singles quarter-finals. His other quarter-final appearances on the Grand Prix tour were at Cologne in 1980 and Mexico City in 1981.

== Grand Prix career finals ==
=== Doubles: 1 (0–1) ===
Result	W/L	Date	Tournament	Surface	Partner	Opponents	Score
Loss	0–1	Mar 1981	Napa, United States	Hard	(United States) Tracy Delatte	(United States) Chris Mayotte (United States) Rick Meyer	3–6, 6–3, 6–7
