= Jay Lapidus =

American tennis player and coach

- Country (sports): United States
- Residence: Durham, North Carolina
- Born: May 1, 1959 (age 66) Princeton, New Jersey, U.S.
- Height: 6 ft 2 in (1.88 m)
- Turned pro: 1980
- Plays: Left-handed
- Prize money: $246,102

Singles
- Career record: 75–106
- Career titles: 1
- Highest ranking: No. 34 (March 21, 1983)

Grand Slam singles results
- Australian Open: 4R (1985)
- French Open: 2R (1982)
- Wimbledon: 3R (1986)
- US Open: 3R (1984)

Doubles
- Career record: 19–51
- Career titles: 0
- Highest ranking: No. 169 (January 3, 1983)

Grand Slam doubles results
- Wimbledon: 1R (1982)
- US Open: 1R (1980, 1982, 1983, 1985)

Jay Lapidus (born May 1, 1959) is a former professional tennis player from the United States.

== Playing career ==
A three time All-American, Lapidus played collegiate tennis for Princeton University.

Lapidus won his only Grand Prix title in 1982, at the Stowe Open. He defeated Tim Mayotte, Brad Gilbert, John Alexander and Tom Gullikson en route to the final, which he won in straight sets, over Eric Fromm. The American also made the semifinals in Basel and Stockholm that year.

His best Grand Slam performance came in the 1985 Australian Open, where he reached the fourth round.

During his career, Lapidus had a number of wins over players ranked in the world's top 20, including Peter Fleming at South Orange in 1979, Chip Hooper at Tampa in 1982, Aaron Krickstein at North Conway in 1984, Vitas Gerulaitis at Houston in 1985 and Juan Aguilera at Memphis in 1985. His best win came in 1982 at a Hartford WCT tournament, where he beat the world number six José Luis Clerc.

== Coaching ==
In 1991, Lapidus became head coach of Duke University and remained in that role until 2008. He finished with a 372–126 record in the Atlantic Coast Conference (ACC), with his wins tally bettered by only two coaches in history. On six occasions, he was named as the ACC Coach of the Year and he coached 13 ACC Championships.

== Personal life ==
Lapidus is married to former Filipino Federation Cup player Pia Tamayo.

== Grand Prix career finals ==
=== Singles: 1 (1–0) ===
Result	W-L	Date	Tournament	Surface	Opponent	Score
Win	1–0	Aug 1982	Stowe, United States	Hard	(United States) Eric Fromm	6–4, 6–2

=== Doubles: 1 (0–1) ===
Result	W-L	Date	Tournament	Surface	Partner	Opponents	Score
Loss	0–1	Nov 1982	Paris, France	Hard	(United States) Rick Meyer	(United States) Brian Gottfried (United States) Bruce Manson	4–6, 2–6
