= Tony Graham (tennis) =

American tennis player

- Country (sports): United States
- Born: October 29, 1956 Sepulveda, California
- Died: May 2, 2023 (aged 66)
- Plays: Right-handed

Singles
- Career record: 19–46
- Highest ranking: No. 100 (July 14, 1980)

Grand Slam singles results
- Australian Open: 1R (1980)
- Wimbledon: 2R (1980)
- US Open: 2R (1978)

Doubles
- Career record: 39–56
- Career titles: 2
- Highest ranking: No. 88 (January 4, 1981)

Grand Slam doubles results
- Australian Open: 1R (1980)
- French Open: 1R (1983)
- Wimbledon: 2R (1981, 1982)
- US Open: 3R (1981)

Tony Graham (October 29, 1956 – May 2, 2023) was a former top 100 tennis player from the United States.

During his career, he won two doubles titles. He achieved a career-high singles ranking of world No. 100 in 1980 and a career-high doubles ranking of world No. 88 in 1981.

== Career finals ==
=== Singles (1 runner-up) ===
Result	W/L	Date	Tournament	Surface	Opponent	Score
Loss	0–1	Aug 1981	Stowe, U.S.	Hard	(United States) Brian Gottfried	3–6, 3–6

=== Doubles (2 titles, 1 runner-up) ===
Result	W/L	Date	Tournament	Surface	Partner	Opponents	Score
Win	1–0	Mar 1980	Lagos, Nigeria	Clay	(United States) Bruce Nichols	(Sweden) Kjell Johansson (Finland) Leo Palin	6–3, 0–6, 6–3
Loss	1–1	Jan 1981	Auckland, New Zealand	Hard	(United States) Bill Scanlon	(United States) Ferdi Taygan (United States) Tim Wilkison	5–7, 1–6
Win	2–1	Oct 1981	Maui, U.S.	Hard	(United States) Matt Mitchell	(Australia) John Alexander (United States) James Delaney	6–3, 3–6, 7–6
