= Tracy Delatte =

American tennis player (born 1956)

- Country (sports): United States
- Born: December 22, 1956 (age 68); New Orleans, Louisiana, U.S.
- Height: 1.78 m (5 ft 10 in)
- Plays: Right-handed
- Prize money: $118,340

Singles
- Career record: 0–7
- Career titles: 0
- Highest ranking: No. 377 (26 December 1979)

Grand Slam singles results
- Australian Open: 1R (1984)
- French Open: 2R (1982)
- Wimbledon: 3R (1984)
- US Open: 3R (1982, 1984)

Doubles
- Career record: 84–112
- Career titles: 3
- Highest ranking: No. 39 (2 January 1984)

Tracy Delatte (born December 22, 1956) is a former professional tennis player from the United States.

Delatte enjoyed most of his tennis success playing doubles. During his career, he won three doubles titles. He achieved a career-high doubles ranking of world no. 39 in 1984.

== Career finals ==
=== Doubles 9 (3–6) ===
Result	W/L	Date	Tournament	Surface	Partner	Opponents	Score
Loss	0–1	Mar 1981	Napa, U.S.	Hard	(United States) John Hayes	(United States) Chris Mayotte (United States) Richard Meyer	3–6, 6–3, 6–7
Loss	0–2	Apr 1981	Las Vegas, U.S.	Hard	(United States) Trey Waltke	(United States) Peter Fleming (United States) John McEnroe	3–6, 6–7
Loss	0–3	Feb 1982	Monterrey, Mexico	Carpet	(United States) Mel Purcell	(United States) Victor Amaya (United States) Hank Pfister	3–6, 7–6, 3–6
Loss	0–4	Mar 1982	Brussels, Belgium	Hard (i)	(United States) Chris Dunk	(Czech Republic) Pavel Složil (United States) Sherwood Stewart	4–6, 7–6, 5–7
Win	1–4	May 1982	Forest Hills WCT, U.S.	Clay	(South Africa) Johan Kriek	(United States) Dick Stockton (United States) Erik van Dillen	6–4, 3–6, 6–3
Loss	1–5	Dec 1982	Hartford WCT, U.S.	Carpet	(United States) Mike Cahill	(United States) Robert Lutz (United States) Dick Stockton	6–7, 3–6
Loss	1–6	Apr 1983	Las Vegas, U.S.	Hard	(United States) Johan Kriek	(South Africa) Kevin Curren (United States) Steve Denton	3–6, 5–7
Win	2–6	May 1983	Forest Hills WCT, U.S.	Clay	(United States) Johan Kriek	(South Africa) Kevin Curren (United States) Steve Denton	6–7, 7–5, 6–3
Win	3–6	Nov 1984	Johannesburg, South Africa	Hard	(Paraguay) Francisco González	(United States) Steve Meister (United States) Eliot Teltscher	7–6, 6–1
