= Chris Mayotte =

American tennis player

- Country (sports): United States
- Born: September 16, 1957 (age 69) Springfield, Massachusetts, U.S.
- Height: 6 ft 1 1/4 in (1.86 m)
- Plays: Right–handed

Singles
- Career record: 34–59
- Career titles: 0
- Highest ranking: No. 85 (March 24, 1980)

Grand Slam singles results
- Australian Open: 2R (1980)
- French Open: 2R (1981)
- Wimbledon: 1R (1980)
- US Open: 3R (1981)

Doubles
- Career record: 35–47
- Career titles: 3
- Highest ranking: No. 99 (January 4, 1982)

Chris Mayotte (born September 16, 1957) is a former professional tennis player from the United States. He enjoyed most of his tennis success while playing doubles. During his career he won three doubles titles.

His younger brother Tim was a former ATP top 10 ranked singles player and won the silver medal at the 1988 Olympics.

== Career finals ==
=== Doubles (3 titles) ===
Result	W/L	Date	Tournament	Surface	Partner	Opponents	Score
Win	1–0	Jan 1981	San Juan, Puerto Rico	Hard	(United States) Tim Mayotte	(United States) Tim Gullikson (United States) Eliot Teltscher	6–4, 7–6
Win	2–0	Mar 1981	Napa, U.S.	Hard	(United States) Richard Meyer	(United States) Tracy Delatte (United States) John Hayes	6–3, 3–6, 7–6
Win	3–0	Nov 1981	Hong Kong	Hard	(United States) Chris Dunk	(United States) Martin Davis (Australia) Brad Drewett	6–4, 7–6
