= Alan Chandronnait =

American tennis player

- Country (sports): United States
- Born: July 31, 1957 (age 69)
- Plays: Right-handed

Singles
- Career record: 0–3
- Highest ranking: No. 397 (Jan 16, 1978)

Alan Chandronnait (born July 31, 1957) is an American former professional tennis player.

Chandronnait is a native of Hudson, New Hampshire, and was a three-time NHIAA singles champion at Alvirne High School. He featured in either the singles or doubles main draw in five editions of the Volvo International, a Grand Prix tournament held in his home state. In 2006 he was inducted into the New England Tennis Hall of Fame.
