= Mike Fishbach =

American tennis player

- Full name: Michael Fishbach
- Country (sports): United States
- Born: December 1, 1954 (age 70); The Bronx, New York, U.S.
- Plays: Right-handed

Singles
- Career record: 17–41
- Career titles: 0
- Highest ranking: No. 47 (January 16, 1978)

Grand Slam singles results
- French Open: 1R (1978)
- Wimbledon: 1R (1978)
- US Open: 3R (1977)

Doubles
- Career record: 38–51
- Career titles: 1

Grand Slam doubles results
- French Open: 1R (1978)
- Wimbledon: 1R (1978)
- US Open: 3R (1978)

Michael Fishbach (born December 1, 1954) is a former professional tennis player from the United States.

== Biography ==
Fishbach, who grew up in Great Neck, New York, was a right-handed player, who famously used the controversial "spaghetti racquet" at the 1977 US Open. The racquet, which was double-strung and greatly increased topspin, was first used professionally by Barry Phillips-Moore. While in a camera store in Gstaad, Switzerland, Fishbach found a similar racquet and although the owner didn't allow him to buy it, he examined it and set about making one of his own when he returned home. With help from his brother, Fishback used nylon strings, cord from a Venetian blind, plastic tubing, and adhesive tape to make the racquet, which he would use in the US Open. After getting through qualifying, he beat Billy Martin in the first round and faced 16th seed Stan Smith in the second round, a match he won easily 6–0, 6–2. His run ended in the third round when he lost to British player John Feaver, who later described seeing balls coming off Fishback's racquet as looking like "an egg in flight". Several weeks later the racquet was banned, soon after Guillermo Vilas had conceded a match against Ilie Năstase who was using one. By the end of the 1977 season, Fishbach was ranked in the world's top 50.

In 1978, he made the main draw of both the French Open and Wimbledon, in addition to the US Open. He also had a win over John Lloyd in the Indianapolis Clay Court Championships that year and won a Grand Prix doubles title at Kitzbühel, with Chris Lewis. His season ended in September when he ruptured two discs in his back. The injury was serious enough that he was unable to walk for six months and it wasn't until late in 1979 that he was able to return to tennis.

He continued on the professional circuit until 1982 and now works as a whale conservationist.

== Grand Prix career finals ==
=== Doubles: 3 (1–2) ===
Result	W/L	Date	Tournament	Surface	Partner	Opponents	Score
Win	1–0	Jul 1978	Kitzbühel, Austria	Clay	(New Zealand) Chris Lewis	(Czechoslovakia) Pavel Huťka (Czechoslovakia) Pavel Složil	6–7, 6–4, 6–3
Loss	1–1	Aug 1978	North Conway, U.S.	Clay	(South Africa) Bernard Mitton	(United Kingdom) Robin Drysdale (United States) Van Winitsky	6–4, 6–7, 3–6
Loss	1–2	Aug 1982	Stowe, U.S.	Hard	(United States) Eric Fromm	(United States) Andy Andrews (United States) John Sadri	3–6, 4–6
