= Stowe Open =

Defunct tennis tournament
- Event name: English Leather Grand Prix; Head Classic
- Tour: Grand Prix circuit
- Founded: 1978
- Abolished: 1983
- Editions: 6
- Location: Stowe, Vermont, U.S.
- Surface: Hard

The Stowe Open, also known in 1978 and 1979 by its sponsored name English Leather Grand Prix and from 1983 onward as the Head Classic, was a Grand Prix affiliated men's tennis tournament played from 1978 to 1983. It was held in Stowe, Vermont in the United States and played on outdoor hard courts. In 2017, it has been replaced by the Stowe Mountain Lodge Classic, an exhibition event which serves as a warm up event for the US Open which takes place every August 22nd–24th.

== Past finals ==
=== Singles ===
Year	Champions	Runners-up	Score
1978	(United States) Jimmy Connors	(United States) Tim Gullikson	6–2, 6–3
1979	(United States) Jimmy Connors	(United States) Mike Cahill	6–0, 6–1
1980	(United States) Robert Lutz	(South Africa) Johan Kriek	6–3, 6–1
1981	(United States) Brian Gottfried	(United States) Tony Graham	6–3, 6–3
1982	(United States) Jay Lapidus	(United States) Eric Fromm	6–4, 6–2
1983	(Australia) John Fitzgerald	(India) Vijay Amritraj	3–6, 6–2, 7–5
↓ Exhibition tournament ↓
1984	(Czechoslovakia) Tomáš Šmíd	(United States) Mel Purcell	6–3, 6–2
1985	(United States) Jimmy Connors	(United States) Gene Mayer	2–6, 6–3, 6–4
1986	(United States) Eliot Teltscher	(Ecuador) Andrés Gómez	6–7^{(6–8)}, 6–4, 6–2
1987	(Czechoslovakia) Ivan Lendl	(United States) Jimmy Arias	6–3, 6–3
1988	(Ecuador) Andrés Gómez	(United States) Dan Goldie	6–3, 6–3

=== Doubles ===
Year	Champions	Runners-up	Score
1978	(United States) Tim Gullikson (United States) Tom Gullikson	(Australia) Mark Edmondson (Australia) Kim Warwick	3–6, 7–6, 6–3
1979	(United States) Mike Cahill (United States) Steve Krulevitz	(India) Anand Amritraj (Australia) Colin Dibley	3–6, 6–3, 6–4
1980	(United States) Robert Lutz (South Africa) Bernard Mitton	(Romania) Ilie Năstase (United States) Ferdi Taygan	6–4, 6–3
1981	(South Africa) Johan Kriek (United States) Larry Stefanki	(United States) Brian Gottfried (United States) Robert Lutz	2–6, 6–1, 6–2
1982	(United States) Andy Andrews (United States) John Sadri	(United States) Mike Fishbach (United States) Eric Fromm	6–3, 6–4
1983	(Australia) Brad Drewett (Australia) Kim Warwick	(United States) Fritz Buehning (United States) Tom Gullikson	4–6, 7–5, 6–2

== See also ==
- 2007 Fed Cup World Group – semifinal played in Stowe
