= Brian Gottfried =

American tennis player (born 1952)

- Country (sports): USA
- Residence: Sarasota, Florida
- Born: January 27, 1952 (age 74) Baltimore, Maryland, U.S.
- Height: 6 ft 0 in (1.83 m)
- Turned pro: 1972
- Retired: 1984
- Plays: Right-handed (one-handed backhand)
- Prize money: $2,782,514

Singles
- Career record: 702–330 (68%)
- Career titles: 25
- Highest ranking: No. 3 (19 June 1977)

Grand Slam singles results
- Australian Open: 3R (1980)
- French Open: F (1977)
- Wimbledon: SF (1980)
- US Open: QF (1977, 1978)

Other tournaments
- Tour Finals: SF (1977, 1978)
- WCT Finals: SF (1981)

Doubles
- Career record: 603–246 (71%)
- Career titles: 54
- Highest ranking: No. 2 (12 December 1976)

Grand Slam doubles results
- Australian Open: QF (1980)
- French Open: W (1975, 1977)
- Wimbledon: W (1976)
- US Open: F (1977)

Brian Edward Gottfried (born January 27, 1952) is an American retired tennis player who won 25 singles titles and 54 doubles titles during his professional career. He was the runner-up in singles at the 1977 French Open, won the 1975 and 1977 French Open Doubles as well as the 1976 Wimbledon Doubles. He achieved a career-high singles ranking on the ATP tour on June 19, 1977, when he became world No. 3, and a career-high doubles ranking on December 12, 1976, when he became world No. 2.

== Tennis career ==
=== Junior and college ===
Gottfried was born in Baltimore, Maryland, and is Jewish. He began playing tennis at the age of 5, after receiving a racquet as a gift. In all, Gottfried won 14 national junior titles. As a teen Gottfried attended Baylor School in Chattanooga, Tennessee, and Piper High School in Sunrise, Florida. In 1970, as a freshman at Trinity University in Texas, he won the USTA boys 18s singles championship, as well as the doubles championship with Alexander Mayer. He was an All-American in 1971 and 1972.

=== Professional career ===
Gottfried began his professional tennis career in 1972. He won five tournaments in 1977 and was runner-up at the French Open to Guillermo Vilas, winning just three games. "I was powerless. Everything I tried he did something better", said Gottfried afterwards. Newsweek described him as the "best male tennis player in the world at the moment" in April 1977, while World Tennis and Tennis Magazine ranked him as No. 4 in their 1977's year-end rankings. He won the Italian Open doubles championship in four consecutive years (1974–1977). He won the men's doubles at the French Open in 1975 and 1977. In 1976, he won the men's doubles title at Wimbledon. He ended his career tied for 22nd in open era singles titles leaders, and tied for 12th in doubles.

Arthur Ashe liked to recall how Gottfried missed his daily practice session to get married, but atoned by doubling his practice time the next day.

Gottfried retired as the player with the greatest number of tour match victories among players who had never won a grand slam. He held this record for 32 years, eventually being succeeded by David Ferrer. He was also second to Ferrer for most titles by a player who never won a major.

== Grand Slam finals ==
=== Singles: 1 (1 runner-up) ===
Result	Year	Championship	Surface	Opponent	Score
Loss	1977	French Open	Clay	(Argentina) Guillermo Vilas	0–6, 3–6, 0–6

=== Doubles: 7 (3 titles, 4 runners-up) ===
Result	Year	Championship	Surface	Partner	Opponents	Score
Win	1975	French Open	Clay	(Mexico) Raúl Ramírez	(Australia) John Alexander (Australia) Phil Dent	6–4, 2–6, 6–2, 6–4
Loss	1976	French Open	Clay	(Mexico) Raúl Ramírez	(United States) Fred McNair (United States) Sherwood Stewart	6–7, 3–6, 1–6
Win	1976	Wimbledon	Grass	(Mexico) Raúl Ramírez	(Australia) Ross Case (Australia) Geoff Masters	3–6, 6–3, 8–6, 2–6, 7–5
Win	1977	French Open	Clay	(Mexico) Raúl Ramírez	(Poland) Wojciech Fibak (Czechoslovakia) Jan Kodeš	7–6, 4–6, 6–3, 6–4
Loss	1977	US Open	Clay	(Mexico) Raúl Ramírez	(South Africa) Bob Hewitt (South Africa) Frew McMillan	4–6, 0–6
Loss	1979	Wimbledon	Grass	(Mexico) Raúl Ramírez	(United States) Peter Fleming (United States) John McEnroe	6–4, 4–6, 2–6, 2–6
Loss	1980	French Open	Clay	(Mexico) Raúl Ramírez	(United States) Victor Amaya (United States) Hank Pfister	6–1, 4–6, 4–6, 3–6

== Grand Slam tournament performance timeline ==
Key
W	F	SF	QF	#R	RR	Q#	DNQ	A	NH

(W) winner; (F) finalist; (SF) semifinalist; (QF) quarterfinalist; (#R) rounds 4, 3, 2, 1; (RR) round-robin stage; (Q#) qualification round; (DNQ) did not qualify; (A) absent; (NH) not held; (SR) strike rate (events won / competed); (W–L) win–loss record.

=== Singles ===
Tournament	1970	1971	1972	1973	1974	1975	1976	1977		1978	1979	1980	1981	1982	1983	1984	SR
Australian Open (Note: The Australian Open was held twice in 1977, in January and December.)	A	A	A	A	A	A	A	A	A	A	A	3R	A	A	A	A	0 / 1
French Open	A	A	2R (Note: The 1972 French Open had two preliminary rounds. Gottfried won in both to enter the main draw. These wins do not count as main draw wins.)	2R	2R	4R	A	F		3R	3R	4R	3R	2R	4R	4R	0 / 12
Wimbledon	A	A	2R	A	2R	3R	4R	2R		QF	3R	SF	2R	2R	4R	1R	0 / 12
US Open	1R	1R	2R	3R	2R	2R	4R	QF		QF	4R	4R	4R	2R	2R	2R	0 / 15
Strike rate	0 / 1	0 / 1	0 / 3	0 / 2	0 / 3	0 / 3	0 / 2	0 / 3		0 / 3	0 / 3	0 / 4	0 / 3	0 / 3	0 / 3	0 / 3	0 / 40

Source: World Tennis

== Career finals ==
=== Singles: 51 (25 titles / 26 runner-ups) ===
Result	W-L	Date	Tournament	Surface	Opponent	Score
Win	1–0	Apr 1973	Johannesburg WCT, South Africa	Hard	(Chile) Jaime Fillol	Walkover
Win	2–0	May 1973	Las Vegas, US	Hard	(United States) Arthur Ashe	6–1, 6–3
Loss	2–1	Oct 1973	Fort Worth, US	Hard	(United States) Eddie Dibbs	5–7, 2–6, 4–6
Loss	2–2	Nov 1973	Christchurch, New Zealand	Grass	(Australia) Fred Stolle	6–7, 4–6, 1–6
Win	3–2	Nov 1974	Paris Indoor, France	Hard (i)	(United States) Eddie Dibbs	6–3, 5–7, 8–6, 6–0
Loss	3–3	Nov 1974	London, UK	Carpet (i)	(United States) Jimmy Connors	2–6, 6–7
Win	4–3	Jan 1975	Baltimore, US	Carpet (i)	(Australia) Allan Stone	3–6, 6–2, 6–3
Win	5–3	Feb 1975	Dayton, US	Carpet (i)	(Australia) Geoff Masters	6–4, 4–6, 6–4
Loss	5–4	Apr 1975	Denver WCT, US	Carpet (i)	(United States) Jimmy Connors	3–6, 4–6
Win	6–4	Oct 1975	Melbourne, Australia	Grass	(United States) Harold Solomon	6–2, 7–6, 6–1
Loss	6–5	Nov 1975	Johannesburg, South Africa	Hard	(United States) Harold Solomon	3–6, 2–6, 7–5, 2–6
Loss	6–6	Feb 1976	Richmond WCT, US	Carpet (i)	(United States) Arthur Ashe	2–6, 4–6
Win	7–6	Sep 1976	Los Angeles, US	Carpet (i)	(United States) Arthur Ashe	6–2, 6–2
Loss	7–7	Oct 1976	San Francisco, US	Carpet (i)	(United States) Roscoe Tanner	6–4, 5–7, 1–6
Loss	7–8	Nov 1976	Johannesburg, South Africa	Hard	(United States) Harold Solomon	2–6, 7–6, 3–6, 4–6
Win	8–8	Jan 1977	Baltimore, US	Carpet (i)	(Argentina) Guillermo Vilas	6–3, 7–6
Win	9–8	Feb 1977	Rancho Mirage, US	Hard	(Argentina) Guillermo Vilas	2–6, 6–1, 6–3
Loss	9–9	Mar 1977	Memphis, US	Hard (i)	(Sweden) Björn Borg	4–6, 3–6, 6–4, 5–7
Win	10–9	Mar 1977	Washington, US	Carpet (i)	(United States) Robert Lutz	6–1, 6–2
Win	11–9	Mar 1977	La Costa, US	Hard	(United States) Marty Riessen	6–3, 6–2
Loss	11–10	Apr 1977	Los Angeles, US	Carpet (i)	(United States) Stan Smith	4–6, 6–2, 3–6
Loss	11–11	Apr 1977	Denver, US	Carpet (i)	(Sweden) Björn Borg	5–7, 2–6
Loss	11–12	Jun 1977	French Open, Paris	Clay	(Argentina) Guillermo Vilas	0–6, 3–6, 0–6
Loss	11–13	Jul 1977	Washington, D.C.	Clay	(Argentina) Guillermo Vilas	4–6, 5–7
Loss	11–14	Aug 1977	Columbus, US	Hard	(Argentina) Guillermo Vilas	2–6, 1–6
Loss	11–15	Sep 1977	Los Angeles, US	Hard	(Mexico) Raúl Ramírez	5–7, 6–3, 4–6
Loss	11–16	Oct 1977	San Francisco, US	Carpet (i)	(United States) Butch Walts	6–4, 3–6, 5–7
Loss	11–17	Oct 1977	Maui, US	Hard	(United States) Jimmy Connors	2–6, 0–6
Win	12–17	Oct 1977	Vienna, Austria	Hard (i)	(Poland) Wojciech Fibak	6–1, 6–1
Loss	12–18	Nov 1977	Paris Indoor, France	Hard (i)	(Italy) Corrado Barazzutti	6–7, 6–7, 7–6, 6–3, 4–6
Win	13–18	Mar 1978	Washington Indoor, US	Carpet (i)	(Mexico) Raúl Ramírez	7–5, 7–6
Win	14–18	Apr 1978	Dayton, US	Carpet (i)	(United States) Eddie Dibbs	2–6, 6–4, 7–6^{(7–4)}
Win	15–18	Apr 1978	Houston WCT, US	Clay	(Romania) Ilie Năstase	3–6, 6–2, 6–1
Loss	15–19	Sep 1978	Los Angeles, US	Carpet (i)	(United States) Arthur Ashe	2–6, 4–6
Loss	15–20	Feb 1979	Rancho Mirage, US	Hard	(United States) Roscoe Tanner	4–6, 2–6
Loss	15–21	Mar 1979	Washington Indoor, US	Carpet (i)	(United States) Roscoe Tanner	4–6, 4–6
Win	16–21	Aug 1979	Columbus, US	Clay	(United States) Eddie Dibbs	6–3, 6–0
Win	17–21	Oct 1979	Basel, Switzerland	Hard (i)	(South Africa) Johan Kriek	7–5, 6–1, 4–6, 6–3
Win	18–21	Jun 1980	Surbiton, UK	Grass	(United States) Sandy Mayer	6–3, 6–3
Win	19–21	Jul 1980	Washington, D.C.	Clay	(Argentina) José Luis Clerc	7–5, 4–6, 6–4
Win	20–21	Oct 1980	Vienna, Austria	Hard (i)	(United States) Trey Waltke	6–2, 6–4, 6–3
Win	21–21	Nov 1980	Paris Indoor, France	Hard (i)	(Italy) Adriano Panatta	4–6, 6–3, 6–1, 7–6
Loss	21–22	Mar 1981	Brussels, Belgium	Carpet (i)	(United States) Jimmy Connors	2–6, 4–6, 3–6
Loss	21–23	Jun 1981	London (Queen's), UK	Grass	(United States) John McEnroe	6–7, 5–7
Win	22–23	Aug 1981	Stowe, US	Hard	(United States) Tony Graham	6–3, 6–3
Loss	22–24	Oct 1981	Vienna, Austria	Hard (i)	(Czechoslovakia) Ivan Lendl	6–1, 0–6, 1–6, 2–6
Win	23–24	May 1982	Tampa, US	Hard	(United States) Mike Estep	6–7^{(6–8)}, 6–2, 6–4
Loss	23–25	Aug 1982	Columbus, Ohio, US	Hard	(United States) Jimmy Connors	5–7, 0–6
Win	24–25	Oct 1982	Vienna, Austria	Hard (i)	(United States) Bill Scanlon	6–1, 6–4, 6–0
Loss	24–26	Nov 1982	London (Wembley), UK	Carpet (i)	(United States) John McEnroe	3–6, 2–6, 4–6
Win	25–26	Oct 1983	Vienna, Austria	Hard (i)	(United States) Mel Purcell	6–2, 6–3, 7–5

Source: ATP

=== Doubles: 95 (54 titles / 41 runner-ups) ===
Result	W-L	Date	Tournament	Surface	Partner	Opponents	Score
Win	1–0	Feb 1973	Philadelphia WCT, US	Carpet	(United States) Dick Stockton	(Australia) Roy Emerson (Australia) Rod Laver	4–6, 6–3, 6–4
Win	2–0	May 1973	Las Vegas, US	Hard	(United States) Dick Stockton	(Australia) Ken Rosewall (Australia) Fred Stolle	6–7, 6–4, 6–4
Loss	2–1	Aug 1973	Cincinnati, US	Hard	(Mexico) Raúl Ramírez	(Australia) John Alexander (Australia) Phil Dent	6–1, 6–7, 6–7
Win	3–1	Oct 1973	Fort Worth, US	Hard	(United States) Dick Stockton	(Australia) Owen Davidson (Australia) John Newcombe	7–6, 6–4
Loss	3–2	Nov 1973	Hong Kong	Hard	(United States) Paul Gerken	(Australia) Colin Dibley (Australia) Rod Laver	3–6, 7–5, 15–17
Loss	3–3	Mar 1974	Atlanta WCT, US	Clay	(United States) Dick Stockton	(United States) Robert Lutz (United States) Stan Smith	3–6, 6–3, 6–7
Loss	3–4	Apr 1974	Orlando WCT, US	Clay	(United States) Dick Stockton	(Australia) Owen Davidson (Australia) John Newcombe	6–7, 3–6
Loss	3–5	May 1974	Hamburg, Germany	Clay	(Mexico) Raúl Ramírez	(West Germany) Jürgen Fassbender (West Germany) Hans-Jürgen Pohmann	3–6, 4–6, 4–6
Win	4–5	Jun 1974	Rome, Italy	Clay	(Mexico) Raúl Ramírez	(Spain) Juan Gisbert Sr. (Romania) Ilie Năstase	6–3, 6–2, 6–3
Loss	4–6	Jul 1974	Chicago, US	Carpet	(Mexico) Raúl Ramírez	(United States) Tom Gorman (United States) Marty Riessen	6–4, 3–6, 5–7
Win	5–6	Aug 1974	South Orange, US	Hard	(Mexico) Raúl Ramírez	(India) Anand Amritraj (India) Vijay Amritraj	7–6, 6–7, 7–6
Loss	5–7	Sep 1974	Los Angeles, US	Hard	(Mexico) Raúl Ramírez	(Australia) Ross Case (Australia) Geoff Masters	3–6, 2–6
Loss	5–8	Oct 1974	Madrid, Spain	Clay	(Mexico) Raúl Ramírez	(France) Patrice Dominguez (Spain) Antonio Muñoz	1–6, 3–6
Loss	5–9	Oct 1974	Tehran, Iran	Clay	(Mexico) Raúl Ramírez	(Spain) Manuel Orantes (Argentina) Guillermo Vilas	6–7, 6–2, 2–6
Loss	5–10	Nov 1974	Paris Indoor, France	Hard (i)	(Mexico) Raúl Ramírez	(France) Patrice Dominguez (France) François Jauffret	5–7, 4–6
Loss	5–11	Nov 1974	London, England	Carpet	(Mexico) Raúl Ramírez	(United States) Jimmy Connors (Romania) Ilie Năstase	6–3, 6–7, 3–6
Win	6–11	Jan 1975	Philadelphia WCT, US	Carpet	(Mexico) Raúl Ramírez	(United States) Dick Stockton (United States) Erik van Dillen	3–6, 6–3, 7–6
Loss	6–12	Feb 1975	Dayton Indoor, US	Carpet	(United States) Paul Gerken	(Australia) Ray Ruffels (Australia) Allan Stone	6–7, 5–7
Win	7–12	Feb 1975	St. Petersburg WCT, US	Hard	(Mexico) Raúl Ramírez	(United States) Charlie Pasarell (United States) Roscoe Tanner	6–4, 6–4
Win	8–12	Feb 1975	La Costa WCT, US	Hard	(Mexico) Raúl Ramírez	(United States) Charlie Pasarell (United States) Roscoe Tanner	7–5, 6–4
Loss	8–13	Mar 1975	São Paulo WCT, Brazil	Carpet	(Mexico) Raúl Ramírez	(Australia) Ross Case (Australia) Geoff Masters	7–6, 6–7, 6–7
Loss	8–14	Mar 1975	Caracas WCT, Venezuela	Hard	(Mexico) Raúl Ramírez	(Australia) Ross Case (Australia) Geoff Masters	5–7, 6–4, 2–6
Win	9–14	Mar 1975	Orlando WCT, US	Hard	(Mexico) Raúl Ramírez	(Australia) Colin Dibley (Australia) Ray Ruffels	6–4, 6–4
Win	10–14	May 1975	World Doubles WCT, Mexico	Carpet	(Mexico) Raúl Ramírez	(United Kingdom) Mark Cox (South Africa) Cliff Drysdale	7–6, 6–7, 6–2, 7–6
Win	11–14	May 1975	Dallas WCT, US	Carpet	(Mexico) Raúl Ramírez	(South Africa) Bob Hewitt (South Africa) Frew McMillan	7–5, 6–3, 4–6, 2–6, 7–5
Win	12–14	Jun 1975	Rome, Italy	Clay	(Mexico) Raúl Ramírez	(United States) Jimmy Connors (Romania) Ilie Năstase	6–4, 7–6, 2–6, 6–1
Win	13–14	Jun 1975	French Open, Paris	Clay	(Mexico) Raúl Ramírez	(Australia) John Alexander (Australia) Phil Dent	6–4, 2–6, 6–2, 6–4
Loss	13–15	Jul 1975	Washington, D.C., US	Clay	(Mexico) Raúl Ramírez	(United States) Robert Lutz (United States) Stan Smith	5–7, 6–2, 1–6
Win	14–15	Aug 1975	Boston, US	Clay	(Mexico) Raúl Ramírez	(United States) John Andrews (United States) Mike Estep	4–6, 6–3, 7–6
Loss	14–16	Oct 1975	Melbourne Indoor, Australia	Grass	(Mexico) Raúl Ramírez	(Australia) Ross Case (Australia) Geoff Masters	4–6, 0–6
Win	15–16	Oct 1975	Sydney Indoor, Australia	Hard (i)	(Mexico) Raúl Ramírez	(Australia) Ross Case (Australia) Geoff Masters	6–4, 6–2
Win	16–16	Oct 1975	Perth, Australia	Hard	(Mexico) Raúl Ramírez	(Australia) Ross Case (Australia) Geoff Masters	2–6, 6–4, 6–4, 6–0
Win	17–16	Nov 1975	Tokyo, Japan	Clay	(Mexico) Raúl Ramírez	(Spain) Juan Gisbert Sr. (Spain) Manuel Orantes	7–6, 6–4
Win	18–16	Jan 1976	Monterrey WCT, Mexico	Carpet	(Mexico) Raúl Ramírez	(Australia) Ross Case (Australia) Geoff Masters	6–2, 4–6, 6–3
Win	19–16	Feb 1976	Richmond WCT, US	Carpet	(Mexico) Raúl Ramírez	(United States) Arthur Ashe (Netherlands) Tom Okker	6–4, 7–5
Win	20–16	Feb 1976	St. Louis WCT, US	Carpet	(Mexico) Raúl Ramírez	(Australia) John Alexander (Australia) Phil Dent	6–4, 6–2
Win	21–16	Mar 1976	Mexico City WCT, Mexico	Clay	(Mexico) Raúl Ramírez	(Egypt) Ismail El Shafei (New Zealand) Brian Fairlie	6–4, 7–6
Win	22–16	Mar 1976	Jackson WCT, US	Carpet	(Mexico) Raúl Ramírez	(Australia) Ross Case (Australia) Geoff Masters	7–5, 4–6, 6–0
Win	23–16	Apr 1976	Caracas WCT, Venezuela	Clay	(Mexico) Raúl Ramírez	(United States) Jeff Borowiak (Romania) Ilie Năstase	7–5, 6–4
Win	24–16	May 1976	Rome, Italy	Clay	(Mexico) Raúl Ramírez	(Australia) Geoff Masters (Australia) John Newcombe	7–6, 5–7, 6–3, 3–6, 6–3
Loss	24–17	Jun 1976	French Open, Paris	Clay	(Mexico) Raúl Ramírez	(United States) Fred McNair (United States) Sherwood Stewart	6–7, 3–6, 1–6
Win	25–17	Jul 1976	Wimbledon, London	Grass	(Mexico) Raúl Ramírez	(Australia) Ross Case (Australia) Geoff Masters	3–6, 6–3, 8–6, 2–6, 7–5
Win	26–17	Jul 1976	Washington, D.C., US	Clay	(Mexico) Raúl Ramírez	(United States) Arthur Ashe (United States) Jimmy Connors	6–3, 6–3
Win	27–17	Aug 1976	North Conway, US	Clay	(Mexico) Raúl Ramírez	(Argentina) Ricardo Cano (Paraguay) Víctor Pecci	6–3, 6–0
Win	28–17	Aug 1976	Indianapolis, US	Clay	(Mexico) Raúl Ramírez	(United States) Fred McNair (United States) Sherwood Stewart	6–2, 6–2
Win	29–17	Sep 1976	Woodlands Doubles, US	Hard	(Mexico) Raúl Ramírez	(Australia) Phil Dent (Australia) Allan Stone	6–1, 6–4, 5–7, 7–6
Loss	29–18	Oct 1976	San Francisco, US	Carpet	(South Africa) Bob Hewitt	(United States) Dick Stockton (United States) Roscoe Tanner	3–6, 4–6
Win	30–18	Oct 1976	Barcelona, Spain	Clay	(Mexico) Raúl Ramírez	(South Africa) Bob Hewitt (South Africa) Frew McMillan	7–6, 6–4
Loss	30–19	Oct 1976	Vienna, Austria	Hard (i)	(Mexico) Raúl Ramírez	(South Africa) Bob Hewitt (South Africa) Frew McMillan	4–6, 0–4, ret.
Loss	30–20	Nov 1976	Wembley, England	Carpet	(Poland) Wojciech Fibak	(United States) Stan Smith (United States) Roscoe Tanner	6–7, 3–6
Win	31–20	Nov 1976	Johannesburg, South Africa	Hard	(United States) Sherwood Stewart	(Spain) Juan Gisbert Sr. (United States) Stan Smith	1–6, 6–1, 6–2, 7–6
Win	32–20	Feb 1977	Miami, US	Clay	(Mexico) Raúl Ramírez	(Australia) Paul Kronk (Australia) Cliff Letcher	7–5, 6–4
Loss	32–21	Mar 1977	Washington Indoor, US	Carpet	(Mexico) Raúl Ramírez	(United States) Robert Lutz (United States) Stan Smith	3–6, 5–7
Win	33–21	May 1977	Rome, Italy	Clay	(Mexico) Raúl Ramírez	(United States) Fred McNair (United States) Sherwood Stewart	6–7, 7–6, 7–5
Win	34–21	Jun 1977	French Open, Paris	Clay	(Mexico) Raúl Ramírez	(Poland) Wojciech Fibak (Czechoslovakia) Jan Kodeš	7–6, 4–6, 6–3, 6–4
Win	35–21	Aug 1977	North Conway, US	Clay	(Mexico) Raúl Ramírez	(United States) Fred McNair (United States) Sherwood Stewart	7–5, 6–3
Loss	35–22	Sep 1977	US Open, New York	Clay	(Mexico) Raúl Ramírez	(South Africa) Bob Hewitt (South Africa) Frew McMillan	4–6, 0–6
Loss	35–23	Oct 1977	Maui, US	Hard	(Mexico) Raúl Ramírez	(United States) Robert Lutz (United States) Stan Smith	6–7, 4–6
Win	36–23	Nov 1977	Paris Indoor, France	Hard (i)	(Mexico) Raúl Ramírez	(United States) Jeff Borowiak (United Kingdom) Roger Taylor	6–2, 6–0
Loss	36–24	Nov 1977	Stockholm, Sweden	Hard (i)	(Mexico) Raúl Ramírez	(Poland) Wojciech Fibak (Netherlands) Tom Okker	3–6, 3–6
Loss	36–25	Nov 1977	Wembley, England	Hard	(Mexico) Raúl Ramírez	(United States) Sandy Mayer (South Africa) Frew McMillan	3–6, 6–7
Win	37–25	Mar 1978	Memphis, US	Carpet	(Mexico) Raúl Ramírez	(Australia) Phil Dent (Australia) John Newcombe	3–6, 7–6, 6–2
Win	38–25	Apr 1978	Dayton, US	Carpet	(Australia) Geoff Masters	(United States) Hank Pfister (United States) Butch Walts	6–3, 6–4
Win	39–25	Feb 1979	Richmond WCT, US	Carpet	(United States) John McEnroe	(Romania) Ion Țiriac (Argentina) Guillermo Vilas	6–4, 6–3
Loss	39–26	Jul 1979	Wimbledon, London	Grass	(Mexico) Raúl Ramírez	(United States) Peter Fleming (United States) John McEnroe	6–4, 4–6, 2–6, 2–6
Loss	39–27	Jul 1979	Washington, US	Clay	(Mexico) Raúl Ramírez	(United States) Marty Riessen (United States) Sherwood Stewart	6–2, 3–6, 4–6
Win	40–27	Aug 1979	Columbus, US	Clay	(United States) Robert Lutz	(United States) Tim Gullikson (United States) Tom Gullikson	4–6, 6–3, 7–6
Win	41–27	Aug 1979	Cincinnati, US	Hard	(Romania) Ilie Năstase	(United States) Robert Lutz (United States) Stan Smith	1–6, 6–3, 7–6
Loss	41–28	Oct 1979	Basel, Switzerland	Hard (i)	(Mexico) Raúl Ramírez	(South Africa) Bob Hewitt (South Africa) Frew McMillan	3–6, 4–6
Loss	41–29	Oct 1979	Vienna, Austria	Hard (i)	(Mexico) Raúl Ramírez	(South Africa) Bob Hewitt (South Africa) Frew McMillan	4–6, 6–3, 1–6
Win	42–29	Jan 1980	Masters Doubles WCT, London	Carpet	(Mexico) Raúl Ramírez	(Poland) Wojciech Fibak (Netherlands) Tom Okker	3–6, 6–4, 6–4, 3–6, 6–3
Loss	42–30	Jan 1980	Baltimore WCT, US	Carpet	(South Africa) Frew McMillan	(United States) Tim Gullikson (United States) Marty Riessen	6–2, 3–6, 4–6
Loss	42–31	Jan 1980	Philadelphia, US	Carpet	(Mexico) Raúl Ramírez	(United States) Peter Fleming (United States) John McEnroe	3–6, 6–7
Loss	42–32	Feb 1980	Richmond WCT, US	Carpet	(South Africa) Frew McMillan	(United States) Fritz Buehning (South Africa) Johan Kriek	6–3, 3–6, 6–7
Win	43–32	Mar 1980	Memphis, US	Carpet	(United States) John McEnroe	(Australia) Rod Frawley (Czechoslovakia) Tomáš Šmíd	6–3, 6–7, 7–6
Loss	43–33	Jun 1980	French Open, Paris	Clay	(Mexico) Raúl Ramírez	(United States) Victor Amaya (United States) Hank Pfister	6–1, 4–6, 4–6, 3–6
Win	44–33	Aug 1980	North Conway, US	Clay	(United States) Jimmy Connors	(South Africa) Kevin Curren (United States) Steve Denton	7–6, 6–2
Win	45–33	Aug 1980	Columbus, US	Hard	(United States) Sandy Mayer	(United States) Peter Fleming (United States) Eliot Teltscher	6–4, 6–2
Win	46–33	Sep 1980	Sawgrass Doubles, US	Hard	(Mexico) Raúl Ramírez	(United States) Robert Lutz (United States) Stan Smith	7–6, 6–4, 2–6, 7–6
Loss	46–34	Nov 1980	Paris Indoor, France	Hard (i)	(South Africa) Raymond Moore	(Italy) Paolo Bertolucci (Italy) Adriano Panatta	4–6, 4–6
Loss	46–35	Dec 1980	Sydney Outdoor, Australia	Grass	(United States) Vitas Gerulaitis	(Australia) Peter McNamara (Australia) Paul McNamee	2–6, 4–6
Loss	46–36	Feb 1981	Philadelphia, US	Carpet	(Mexico) Raúl Ramírez	(United States) Marty Riessen (United States) Sherwood Stewart	2–6, 2–6
Loss	46–37	Feb 1981	Richmond WCT, US	Carpet	(Mexico) Raúl Ramírez	(United States) Tim Gullikson (South Africa) Bernard Mitton	6–3, 2–6, 3–6
Win	47–37	Mar 1981	Milan, Italy	Carpet	(Mexico) Raúl Ramírez	(United States) John McEnroe (United States) Peter Rennert	7–6, 6–3
Loss	47–38	Aug 1981	Stowe, US	Hard	(United States) Robert Lutz	(South Africa) Johan Kriek (United States) Larry Stefanki	6–2, 1–6, 2–6
Win	48–38	Feb 1982	La Quinta, US	Hard	(Mexico) Raúl Ramírez	(United Kingdom) John Lloyd (United States) Dick Stockton	6–4, 3–6, 6–2
Loss	48–39	May 1982	Tampa, US	Hard	(United States) Hank Pfister	(United States) Tim Gullikson (United States) Tom Gullikson	2–6, 3–6
Win	49–39	Sep 1982	Sawgrass Doubles, US	Clay	(Mexico) Raúl Ramírez	(Australia) Mark Edmondson (Australia) Kim Warwick	W/O
Win	50–39	Nov 1982	Paris Indoor, France	Hard (i)	(United States) Bruce Manson	(United States) Jay Lapidus (United States) Richard Meyer	6–4, 6–2
Win	51–39	Nov 1982	Johannesburg, South Africa	Hard	(South Africa) Frew McMillan	(Israel) Shlomo Glickstein (Zimbabwe) Andrew Pattison	6–2, 6–2
Loss	51–40	Jan 1983	Masters Doubles WCT, London	Carpet	(Mexico) Raúl Ramírez	(Switzerland) Heinz Günthardt (Hungary) Balázs Taróczy	3–6, 5–7, 6–7
Win	52–40	Feb 1983	La Quinta, US	Hard	(Mexico) Raúl Ramírez	(South Africa) Tian Viljoen (South Africa) Danie Visser	6–3, 6–3
Loss	52–41	May 1983	Hamburg, Germany	Clay	(Australia) Mark Edmondson	(Switzerland) Heinz Günthardt (Hungary) Balázs Taróczy	6–7, 6–4, 4–6
Win	53–41	Jun 1983	London/Queen's Club, UK	Grass	(Australia) Paul McNamee	(South Africa) Kevin Curren (United States) Steve Denton	6–4, 6–3
Win	54–41	Aug 1984	North Conway, US	Clay	(Czechoslovakia) Tomáš Šmíd	(Brazil) Cássio Motta (United States) Blaine Willenborg	6–4, 6–2

Source: ATP

== Davis Cup ==
Gottfried was 7–7 in Davis Cup play for the US between 1975 and 1982 and won it twice (in 1978 and 1982).

== Halls of Fame & awards ==
Gottfried won the 1974 and 1975 ATP Doubles Team of the Year Award with partner Raúl Ramírez.

He won the 1976 ATP Most Improved Player Award.

He won the ATP Sportsmanship award in 1984.

Gottfried was inducted into the Intercollegiate Tennis Association's Intercollegiate Tennis Hall of Fame in 1990.

Gottfried, who is Jewish, was inducted into the International Jewish Sports Hall of Fame in 1999.

== Life after playing career ==
Gottfried now lives in Sarasota, Florida. In 2007 Gottfried joined the coaching staff at the Harold Solomon Tennis Institute in Fort Lauderdale.

In 2010, Gottfried coached with the Bollettieri Tennis Program at the IMG Academy in Bradenton, Florida.

He was elected to the ATP Player Council in 2012 as an alumni representative.

In 2015, he joined the coaching staff at the Bolles School

His younger brother, Larry was also a tennis player.

== See also ==
- List of select Jewish tennis players

Awards
Preceded by Wojtek Fibak	ATP Most Improved Player; 1977	Succeeded by John McEnroe
