= 1985 WCT Houston Shootout – Doubles =

Doubles
- 1985 WCT Houston Shootout

Final
- Champions: (United States) Peter Fleming (United States) John McEnroe
- Runners-up: (United States) Hank Pfister (United States) Ben Testerman
- Score: 6–3, 6–2

Details
- Draw: 16
- Seeds: 4

Events
Singles	Doubles
WCT Houston Shootout	· 1986 →

In the inaugural edition of the tournament, Peter Fleming and John McEnroe won the title by defeating Hank Pfister and Ben Testerman 6–3, 6–2 in the final.

== Seeds ==
1. (United States) Peter Fleming / (United States) John McEnroe (champions)
2. (United States) Sherwood Stewart / (Australia) Kim Warwick (first round)
3. (United States) Ken Flach / (United States) Robert Seguso (semifinals)
4. (South Africa) Kevin Curren / (Poland) Wojciech Fibak (first round)

== Draw ==
=== Key ===
- Q = Qualifier
- WC = Wild card
- LL = Lucky loser
- Alt = Alternate
- SE = Special exempt
- PR = Protected ranking
- ITF = ITF entry
- JE = Junior exempt
- w/o = Walkover
- r = Retired
- d = Defaulted
- SR = Special ranking

=== Draw ===
First round
1	(United States) P Fleming (United States) J McEnroe	6	7
(United States) M Dickson (United States) T Wilkison	3	6
(United States) S Giammalva Jr. (United States) T Giammalva	6	3	7
(United States) Ti Gullikson (United States) To Gullikson	4	6	6
3	(United States) K Flach (United States) R Seguso	7	6
(Australia) J Alexander (Australia) B Dyke	6	0
(United States) G Donnelly (United States) B Walts	3	4
(United States) V Gerulaitis (United States) L Shiras	6	6
(United States) S Denton (Brazil) J Soares	6	6
(United States) H Pfister (United States) B Testerman	7	7
(United States) P Annacone (South Africa) C van Rensburg	6	4	7
4	(South Africa) K Curren (Poland) W Fibak	2	6	5
(United States) D Dowlen (Australia) D Graham	3	6
(United States) D Gitlin (United States) B Manson	6	7
(Sweden) J Gunnarsson (Denmark) M Mortensen	7	7
2	(United States) S Stewart (Australia) K Warwick	6	6

Quarterfinals
1	(United States) P Fleming (United States) J McEnroe	4	6	7
(United States) S Giammalva Jr. (United States) T Giammalva	6	2	5
3	(United States) K Flach (United States) R Seguso	4	6	6
(United States) V Gerulaitis (United States) L Shiras	6	2	3
(United States) H Pfister (United States) B Testerman	6	6	6
(United States) P Annacone (South Africa) C van Rensburg	4	7	1
(United States) D Gitlin (United States) B Manson	6	6
(Sweden) J Gunnarsson (Denmark) M Mortensen	3	4

Semifinals
1	(United States) P Fleming (United States) J McEnroe	6	7
3	(United States) K Flach (United States) R Seguso	4	6
(United States) H Pfister (United States) B Testerman	6	6
(United States) D Gitlin (United States) B Manson	3	3

Final
1	(United States) P Fleming (United States) J McEnroe	6	6
(United States) H Pfister (United States) B Testerman	3	2
