= 1985 WCT Houston Shootout =

- Date: February 25 – March 3
- Edition: 1st
- Category: Grand Prix (WCT)
- Draw: 32S / 16D
- Prize money: $300,000
- Surface: Carpet
- Location: Houston, United States
- Venue: Sam Houston Coliseum

Champions

Singles
- (United States) John McEnroe

Doubles
- (United States) Peter Fleming / (United States) John McEnroe
- WCT Houston Shootout

The 1985 WCT Houston Shootout was a men's tennis tournament played on indoor carpet courts. It was a World Championship Tennis event which was part of the 1985 Nabisco Grand Prix, as the two organisations had reunited. It was the inaugural edition of the tournament and was played at the Sam Houston Coliseum in Houston, United States from February 25 through March 3, 1985. First-seeded John McEnroe won the singles title and earned $60,000 prize money.

== Finals ==
=== Singles ===
(United States) John McEnroe defeated (South Africa) Kevin Curren, 7–5, 6–1, 7–6^{(7–4)}

- It was McEnroe's 2nd singles title of the year and the 61st of his career.

=== Doubles ===
(United States) Peter Fleming / (United States) John McEnroe defeated (United States) Hank Pfister / (United States) Ben Testerman, 6–3, 6–2

- It was Fleming's 2nd doubles title of the year and the 53rd of his career. It was McEnroe's 1st doubles title of the year and the 63rd of his career.

== Prize money ==
Event	W	F	SF	QF	Round of 16	Round of 32
Singles	$60,000	$30,000	$15,900	$8,550	$4,650	$2,550
Doubles*	$18,000	$9,000	$4,980	$3,120	$2,070	—N/a

- per team
