= 1983 West of England Championships – Doubles =

Doubles
- 1983 West of England Championships

Final
- Champions: (Australia) John Alexander (Australia) John Fitzgerald
- Runners-up: (United States) Tom Gullikson (United States) Johan Kriek
- Score: 7–5, 6–4

Details
- Draw: 16
- Seeds: 4

Events
Singles	Doubles
← 1982 ·	Bristol Open	· 1984 →

Tim Gullikson and Tom Gullikson were the defending champions, but Tim Gullikson did not participate this year. Tom Gullikson partnered Johan Kriek, losing in the final.

John Alexander and John Fitzgerald won the title, defeating Gullikson and Johan Kriek 7–5, 6–4 in the final.

== Seeds ==
1. (Australia) Mark Edmondson / (United States) Sherwood Stewart (semifinals)
2. (United States) Tom Gullikson / (United States) Johan Kriek (final)
3. (United States) Victor Amaya / (United States) Hank Pfister (first round)
4. (Australia) John Alexander / (Australia) John Fitzgerald (champions)

== Draw ==
=== Key ===
- Q = Qualifier
- WC = Wild card
- LL = Lucky loser
- Alt = Alternate
- ITF = ITF entry
- PR = Protected ranking
- SR = Special ranking
- SE = Special exempt
- JE = Junior exempt
- JR = Junior Accelerator Programme entrant
- CO = College Accelerator Programme entrant
- NG = Next Gen Accelerator Program entrant
- w/o = Walkover
- r = Retired
- d = Defaulted

=== Draw ===
First round
1	(Australia) M Edmondson (United States) S Stewart	6	6	8
(United States) D Gitlin (United States) R Van't Hof	7	2	6
(Australia) B Drewett (Australia) C Johnstone	7	6
(South Africa) E Edwards (United Kingdom) J Smith	6	4
4	(Australia) J Alexander (Australia) J Fitzgerald	6	6
(United States) M De Palmer (United States) B Testerman	4	4
(Brazil) G Barbosa (Brazil) J Soares	7	3	6
(United States) R Harmon (United Kingdom) R Lewis	6	6	4
(United States) L Bourne (United States) MS Strode	w/o
(United States) M Dickson (Nigeria) N Odizor
(Chile) R Acuña (Brazil) M Hocevar	6	7
3	(United States) V Amaya (United States) H Pfister	2	5
(Australia) R Case (United States) CB Strode	7	6
(South Africa) F McMillan (United States) T Wilkison	6	4
(Chile) J Fillol (United States) S Smith	1	4
2	(United States) T Gullikson (United States) J Kriek	6	6

Quarterfinals
1	(Australia) M Edmondson (United States) S Stewart	6	7
(Australia) B Drewett (Australia) C Johnstone	4	5
4	(Australia) J Alexander (Australia) J Fitzgerald	3	6	6
(Brazil) G Barbosa (Brazil) J Soares	6	2	3
(United States) L Bourne (United States) MS Strode	7	6
(Chile) R Acuña (Brazil) M Hocevar	5	3
(Australia) R Case (United States) CB Strode	2	2
2	(United States) T Gullikson (United States) J Kriek	6	6

Semifinals
1	(Australia) M Edmondson (United States) S Stewart	6	5
4	(Australia) J Alexander (Australia) J Fitzgerald	7	7
(United States) L Bourne (United States) MS Strode	6	6	7
2	(United States) T Gullikson (United States) J Kriek	7	3	9

Final
4	(Australia) J Alexander (Australia) J Fitzgerald	7	6
2	(United States) T Gullikson (United States) J Kriek	5	4
