= 1982 Bristol Open – Singles =

Singles
- 1982 Bristol Open

Final
- Champion: (Australia) John Alexander
- Runner-up: (United States) Tim Mayotte
- Score: 6–3, 6–4

Details
- Draw: 32
- Seeds: 8

Events
Singles	Doubles
← 1981 ·	Bristol Open	· 1983 →

Mark Edmondson was the defending champion, but lost in the second round this year.

John Alexander won the title, defeating Tim Mayotte 6–3, 6–4 in the final.

== Seeds ==
1. (United States) Johan Kriek (second round)
2. (Australia) Mark Edmondson (second round)
3. (United States) Roscoe Tanner (second round)
4. (United States) John Sadri (second round)
5. (United States) Vincent Van Patten (first round)
6. (United States) Hank Pfister (second round)
7. (New Zealand) Chris Lewis (first round)
8. (United States) Tim Mayotte (final)

== Draw ==
=== Key ===
- Q = Qualifier
- WC = Wild card
- LL = Lucky loser
- Alt = Alternate
- SE = Special exempt
- PR = Protected ranking
- ITF = ITF entry
- JE = Junior exempt
- w/o = Walkover
- r = Retired
- d = Defaulted
- SR = Special ranking

=== Finals ===
Semifinals
(New Zealand) Russell Simpson	2	5
8	(United States) Tim Mayotte	6	7
Q	(United States) Marty Davis	1	6
(Australia) John Alexander	6	7

Final
8	(United States) Tim Mayotte	3	4
(Australia) John Alexander	6	6

=== Top half ===
First round
1	(United States) J Kriek	6	6
(Egypt) I El Shafei	1	2
(New Zealand) R Simpson	6	7
Q	(South Africa) B Mitton	1	5
(United States) N Saviano	4	2
(Spain) J López-Maeso	6	6
(United States) S Smith	2	4
6	(United States) H Pfister	6	6
3	(United States) R Tanner	7	6
(India) R Krishnan	6	3
(Australia) P McNamee	6	4
(Brazil) J Soares	7	6
(Brazil) J Góes	3	1
(France) H Leconte	6	6
Q	(South Africa) D Visser	7	3	4
8	(United States) T Mayotte	6	6	6

Second round
1	(United States) J Kriek	5	7	1
(New Zealand) R Simpson	7	6	6
(Spain) J López-Maeso	6	5	6
6	(United States) H Pfister	4	7	2
3	(United States) R Tanner	2	6	6
(Brazil) J Soares	6	2	7
(France) H Leconte	4	7	3
8	(United States) T Mayotte	6	6	6

Quarterfinals
(New Zealand) R Simpson	7	6
(Spain) J López-Maeso	5	3
(Brazil) J Soares	6	2	6
8	(United States) T Mayotte	2	6	7

Semifinals
(New Zealand) R Simpson	2	5
8	(United States) T Mayotte	6	7

=== Bottom half ===
First round
5	(United States) V Van Patten	4	6	6
LL	(Brazil) M Hocevar	6	4	7
(Romania) I Năstase	1	6
Q	(United States) M Davis	6	7
(United Kingdom) J Smith	7	6
(United States) F Buehning	6	4
(Australia) R Frawley	6	3	6
4	(United States) J Sadri	4	6	7
7	(New Zealand) C Lewis	3	7	3
(Australia) J Alexander	6	6	6
(Australia) J Fitzgerald	4	4
(United States) T Gullikson	6	6
(United States) V Winitsky	4	6	1
(Republic of Ireland) M Doyle	6	4	6
Q	(South Africa) D Tarr	3	4
2	(Australia) M Edmondson	6	6

Second round
LL	(Brazil) M Hocevar	4	6	3
Q	(United States) M Davis	6	2	6
(United Kingdom) J Smith	4	7	7
4	(United States) J Sadri	6	6	6
(Australia) J Alexander	7	6
(United States) T Gullikson	6	2
(Republic of Ireland) M Doyle	7	6
2	(Australia) M Edmondson	6	3

Quarterfinals
Q	(United States) M Davis	6	6
(United Kingdom) J Smith	3	1
(Australia) J Alexander	6	4	6
(Republic of Ireland) M Doyle	2	6	4

Semifinals
Q	(United States) M Davis	1	6
(Australia) J Alexander	6	7
