= 1985 ATP Championship – Doubles =

Doubles
- 1985 Cincinnati Open

Final
- Champions: (Sweden) Stefan Edberg (Sweden) Anders Järryd
- Runners-up: (Sweden) Joakim Nyström (Sweden) Mats Wilander
- Score: 4–6, 6–2, 6–3

Details
- Draw: 32
- Seeds: 8

Events
Singles	Doubles
← 1984 ·	Cincinnati Masters	· 1986 →

Francisco González and Matt Mitchell were the defending champions, but González did not compete this year. Mitchell teamed up with John Lloyd and lost in the second round to Mark Edmondson and Kim Warwick.

Stefan Edberg and Anders Järryd won the title by defeating Joakim Nyström and Mats Wilander 4–6, 6–2, 6–3 in the final.

== Seeds ==
1. (United States) Ken Flach / (United States) Robert Seguso (first round)
2. (Sweden) Stefan Edberg / (Sweden) Anders Järryd (champions)
3. (Sweden) Joakim Nyström / (Sweden) Mats Wilander (final)
4. (Australia) Mark Edmondson / (Australia) Kim Warwick (semifinals)
5. (Australia) John Fitzgerald / (Australia) Wally Masur (quarterfinals)
6. (France) Henri Leconte / (France) Yannick Noah (semifinals)
7. (India) Vijay Amritraj / (Czechoslovakia) Pavel Složil (first round)
8. (Chile) Hans Gildemeister / (Paraguay) Víctor Pecci (first round)

== Draw ==
=== Key ===
- Q = Qualifier
- WC = Wild card
- LL = Lucky loser
- Alt = Alternate
- SE = Special exempt
- PR = Protected ranking
- ITF = ITF entry
- JE = Junior exempt
- w/o = Walkover
- r = Retired
- d = Defaulted
- SR = Special ranking

=== Finals ===
Semifinals
6	(France) Henri Leconte (France) Yannick Noah	3	5
3	(Sweden) Joakim Nyström (Sweden) Mats Wilander	6	7
4	(Australia) Mark Edmondson (Australia) Kim Warwick	6	6	6
2	(Sweden) Stefan Edberg (Sweden) Anders Järryd	7	3	7

Final
3	(Sweden) Joakim Nyström (Sweden) Mats Wilander	6	2	3
2	(Sweden) Stefan Edberg (Sweden) Anders Järryd	4	6	6

=== Top half ===
First round
1	(United States) K Flach (United States) R Seguso	4	5
(Switzerland) J Hlasek (United States) T Wilkison	6	7
(United States) R Baxter (United States) M De Palmer	6	5	0^{r}
(United States) D Dowlen (Nigeria) N Odizor	1	7	0
(Denmark) M Mortensen (Sweden) H Simonsson	6	3	6
(United States) C Hooper (Czechoslovakia) L Pimek	3	6	1
(Brazil) D Campos (Brazil) C Motta	6	4
6	(France) H Leconte (France) Y Noah	7	6
3	(Sweden) J Nyström (Sweden) M Wilander	6	6	6
(United States) T Gullikson (United States) T Gullikson	7	4	4
(Brazil) G Barbosa (Brazil) I Kley	2	7	4
(United States) T Delatte (United States) J Kriek	6	5	6
(Chile) R Acuña (United States) E Fernández	6	6
(United States) B Teacher (South Africa) C van Rensburg	4	2
(United Kingdom) C Dowdeswell (Israel) S Perkiss	6	4	7
8	(Chile) H Gildemeister (Paraguay) V Pecci	4	6	6

Second round
(Switzerland) J Hlasek (United States) T Wilkison	6	5
(United States) D Dowlen (Nigeria) N Odizor	7	7
(Denmark) M Mortensen (Sweden) H Simonsson	6	3
6	(France) H Leconte (France) Y Noah	7	6
3	(Sweden) J Nyström (Sweden) M Wilander	6	6
(United States) T Delatte (United States) J Kriek	4	3
(Chile) R Acuña (United States) E Fernández	7	6	6
(United Kingdom) C Dowdeswell (Israel) S Perkiss	6	7	3

Quarterfinals
(United States) D Dowlen (Nigeria) N Odizor	4	6	2
6	(France) H Leconte (France) Y Noah	6	3	6
3	(Sweden) J Nyström (Sweden) M Wilander	6	3	6
(Chile) R Acuña (United States) E Fernández	3	6	3

Semifinals
6	(France) H Leconte (France) Y Noah	3	5
3	(Sweden) J Nyström (Sweden) M Wilander	6	7

=== Bottom half ===
First round
5	(Australia) J Fitzgerald (Australia) W Masur	6	6
(India) A Amritraj (United States) A Kohlberg	2	1
(United States) D Gitlin (United States) M Leach	6	6
(United States) C Cox (United States) C Strode	3	1
(United Kingdom) J Lloyd (United States) M Mitchell	6	4	6
(United States) T Moor (New Zealand) R Simpson	4	6	4
(United States) G Donnelly (United States) S Meister	4	6
4	(Australia) M Edmondson (Australia) K Warwick	6	7
7	(India) V Amritraj (Czechoslovakia) P Slozil	6	6
(United States) M Freeman (South Africa) M Robertson	7	7
(Sweden) P Hjertquist (Czech Republic) J Navrátil	2	6	6
(United States) H Pfister (United States) B Testerman	6	3	4
(United States) M Davis (Australia) D Graham	3	6	6
(United States) M Bauer (United States) V Van Patten	6	3	4
(Italy) P Canè (Italy) C Panatta	3	2
2	(Sweden) S Edberg (Sweden) A Järryd	6	6

Second round
5	(Australia) J Fitzgerald (Australia) W Masur	5	7	6
(United States) D Gitlin (United States) M Leach	7	5	3
(United Kingdom) J Lloyd (United States) M Mitchell	1	4
4	(Australia) M Edmondson (Australia) K Warwick	6	6
(United States) M Freeman (South Africa) M Robertson	1	4
(Sweden) P Hjertquist (Czech Republic) J Navrátil	6	6
(United States) M Davis (Australia) D Graham	2	0
2	(Sweden) S Edberg (Sweden) A Järryd	6	6

Quarterfinals
5	(Australia) J Fitzgerald (Australia) W Masur	6	5	2
4	(Australia) M Edmondson (Australia) K Warwick	1	7	6
(Sweden) P Hjertquist (Czech Republic) J Navrátil	3	3
2	(Sweden) S Edberg (Sweden) A Järryd	6	6

Semifinals
4	(Australia) M Edmondson (Australia) K Warwick	6	6	6
2	(Sweden) S Edberg (Sweden) A Järryd	7	3	7
