= 1981 Bristol Open =

- Date: 15–20 June
- Edition: 2nd
- Category: Grand Prix
- Draw: 32S / 16D
- Prize money: $75,000
- Surface: Grass / outdoor
- Location: Bristol, England

Champions

Singles
- (Australia) Mark Edmondson

Doubles
- (United States) Billy Martin / (New Zealand) Russell Simpson
← 1972 ·	Bristol Open	· 1982 →

The 1981 Bristol Open, also known by its sponsored name Lambert & Butler Championships, was a tennis tournament played on outdoor grass courts that was part of the 1981 Volvo Grand Prix. It was played at Bristol in Great Britain and was held from 15 June until 20 June 1981. Unseeded Mark Edmondson won the singles title.

== Finals ==
=== Singles ===
(Australia) Mark Edmondson defeated (United States) Roscoe Tanner 6–3, 5–7, 6–4

- It was Edmondson's 2nd title of the year and the 15th of his career.

=== Doubles ===
(United States) Billy Martin / (New Zealand) Russell Simpson defeated (United States) John Austin / (South Africa) Johan Kriek 6–3, 4–6, 6–4

- It was Martin's only title of the year and the 4th of his career. It was Simpson's only title of the year and the 5th of his career.
