= 1985 ATP Championship – Singles =

Singles
- 1985 Cincinnati Open

Final
- Champion: (West Germany) Boris Becker
- Runner-up: (Sweden) Mats Wilander
- Score: 6–4, 6–2

Details
- Draw: 64 (8Q)
- Seeds: 16

Events
| Singles | Doubles |
- Cincinnati Masters

Mats Wilander was the defending champion, but lost in the final to Boris Becker. The score was 6–4, 6–2.

== Seeds ==
1. (Sweden) Mats Wilander (final)
2. (Sweden) Anders Järryd (quarterfinals)
3. (France) Yannick Noah (third round)
4. (Germany) Boris Becker (champion)
5. (Sweden) Stefan Edberg (quarterfinals)
6. (Sweden) Joakim Nyström (semifinals)
7. (United States) Johan Kriek (first round)
8. (Sweden) Henrik Sundström (third round)
9. (Argentina) Martín Jaite (first round)
10. (United States) David Pate (second round)
11. (United States) Greg Holmes (first round)
12. (France) Henri Leconte (first round)
13. (Argentina) José Luis Clerc (second round)
14. (United States) Ben Testerman (first round)
15. (United States) Mike Leach (first round)
16. (India) Ramesh Krishnan (first round)

Click on the seed number of a player to go to their draw section.

== Draw ==
Key

- Q = Qualifier
- WC = Wild card
- LL = Lucky loser
- Alt = Alternate
- ITF = ITF entry
- PR = Protected ranking
- SR = Special ranking
- SE = Special exempt
- JE = Junior exempt
- JR = Junior Accelerator Programme entrant
- CO = College Accelerator Programme entrant
- NG = Next Gen Accelerator Program entrant
- w/o = Walkover
- r = Retired
- d = Defaulted

=== Finals ===
Quarterfinals
1 | (Sweden) Mats Wilander | 6 | 6 | 6
5 | (Sweden) Stefan Edberg | 3 | 7 | 2
(United States) Tim Wilkison | 6 | 6
(United States) Jimmy Brown | 3 | 4
(United States) Hank Pfister | 7 | 1 | 4
4 | (Germany) Boris Becker | 5 | 6 | 6
6 | (Sweden) Joakim Nyström | 6 | 6
2 | (Sweden) Anders Järryd | 2 | 1

Semifinals
1 | (Sweden) Mats Wilander | 6 | 6
(United States) Tim Wilkison | 2 | 1
4 | (Germany) Boris Becker | 6 | 7
6 | (Sweden) Joakim Nyström | 4 | 5

Final
1 | (Sweden) Mats Wilander | 4 | 2
4 | (Germany) Boris Becker | 6 | 6

=== Top half ===
==== Section 1 ====
First round
1 | (Sweden) M Wilander | 6 | 6
(United States) V Van Patten | 0 | 1
Q | (South Africa) M Robertson | 4 | 4
(Czechoslovakia) P Slozil | 6 | 6
(United States) K Flach | 6 | 6
(France) G Forget | 4 | 4
(United States) B Schultz | 6 | 6
16 | (India) R Krishnan | 3 | 1
11 | (United States) G Holmes | 4 | 1
(Switzerland) J Hlasek | 6 | 6
(Italy) C Panatta | 7 | 4 | 4
(United States) T Gullikson | 6 | 6 | 6
(United States) J Lapidus | 6 | 6
(Paraguay) V Pecci | 4 | 4
(Australia) J Fitzgerald | 4 | 3
5 | (Sweden) S Edberg | 6 | 6

Second round
1 | (Sweden) M Wilander | 6 | 6
(Czechoslovakia) P Slozil | 1 | 3
(United States) K Flach | 4 | 7 | 6
(United States) B Schultz | 6 | 6 | 0
(Switzerland) J Hlasek | 6 | 2
(United States) T Gullikson | 7 | 6
(United States) J Lapidus | 5 | 4
5 | (Sweden) S Edberg | 7 | 6

Third round
1 | (Sweden) M Wilander | 6 | 6
(United States) K Flach | 1 | 4
(United States) T Gullikson | 4 | 2
5 | (Sweden) S Edberg | 6 | 6

Quarterfinals
1 | (Sweden) M Wilander | 6 | 6 | 6
5 | (Sweden) S Edberg | 3 | 7 | 2

==== Section 2 ====
First round
3 | (France) Y Noah | 6 | 6
(United States) M Bauer | 3 | 3
(Australia) W Masur | 6 | 2
(West Germany) H Schwaier | 7 | 6
Q | (United States) M Anger | 3 | 3
(United States) T Wilkison | 6 | 6
(Australia) B Drewett | 2 | 6 | 6
9 | (Argentina) M Jaite | 6 | 2 | 1
13 | (Argentina) J Luis Clerc | 7 | 6
(Uruguay) D Pérez | 5 | 4
Q | (South Africa) H de Wet | 5 | 2
(United States) B Scanlon | 7 | 6
(United Kingdom) J Lloyd | 3 | 1
(France) T Benhabiles | 6 | 6
(United States) J Brown | 7 | 6
7 | (United States) J Kriek | 6 | 4

Second round
3 | (France) Y Noah | 7 | 6
(West Germany) H Schwaier | 5 | 4
(United States) T Wilkison | 6 | 6
(Australia) B Drewett | 2 | 2
13 | (Argentina) J Luis Clerc | 6 | 6
(United States) B Scanlon | 7 | 7
(France) T Benhabiles | 5 | 1
(United States) J Brown | 7 | 6

Third round
3 | (France) Y Noah | 3 | 7 | 3
(United States) T Wilkison | 6 | 6 | 6
(United States) B Scanlon | 5 | 1
(United States) J Brown | 7 | 6

Quarterfinals
(United States) T Wilkison | 6 | 6
(United States) J Brown | 3 | 4

=== Bottom half ===
==== Section 3 ====
First round
8 | (Sweden) H Sundström | 6 | 6
(Chile) H Gildemeister | 2 | 4
Q | (South Africa) D Visser | 7 | 6
(United States) M Davis | 6 | 3
Q | (United States) S Devries | 4 | 3
(United States) H Pfister | 6 | 6
(United States) B Green | 3 | 6 | 6
15 | (United States) M Leach | 6 | 4 | 1
14 | (United States) B Testerman | 2 | 4
Q | (United States) T Cain | 6 | 6
(Czechoslovakia) L Pimek | 6 | 1
(United States) J Sadri | 7 | 6
(France) T Tulasne | 3 | 7 | 4
(United States) B Teacher | 6 | 5 | 6
(Israel) S Perkiss | 2 | 3
4 | (Germany) B Becker | 6 | 6

Second round
8 | (Sweden) H Sundström | 6 | 7
Q | (South Africa) D Visser | 4 | 5
(United States) H Pfister | 3 | 6 | 6
(United States) B Green | 6 | 2 | 4
Q | (United States) T Cain | 3 | 3
(United States) J Sadri | 6 | 6
(United States) B Teacher | 4 | 4
4 | (Germany) B Becker | 6 | 6

Third round
8 | (Sweden) H Sundström | 0 | 1
(United States) H Pfister | 6 | 6
(United States) J Sadri | 6 | 1 | 4
4 | (Germany) B Becker | 4 | 6 | 6

Quarterfinals
(United States) H Pfister | 7 | 1 | 4
4 | (Germany) B Becker | 5 | 6 | 6

==== Section 4 ====
First round
6 | (Sweden) J Nyström | 2 | 6 | 7
(United States) M Purcell | 6 | 3 | 6
(United States) C Hooper | 6 | 6
(United States) M Mitchell | 3 | 4
(United States) T Moor | 1 | 7 | 6
Q | (Israel) A Mansdorf | 6 | 6 | 2
Q | (United States) E Iskersky | 4 | 7 | 3
10 | (United States) D Pate | 6 | 5 | 6
12 | (France) H Leconte | 6 | 4
(India) V Amritraj | 7 | 6
(Argentina) A Ganzábal | 7 | 3 | 4
(United States) M Flur | 6 | 6 | 6
(Chile) R Acuña | 2 | 6 | 7
(United States) R Seguso | 6 | 4 | 6
(United States) M De Palmer | 6 | 4
2 | (Sweden) A Järryd | 7 | 6

Second round
6 | (Sweden) J Nyström | 6 | 6
(United States) C Hooper | 3 | 4
(United States) T Moor | 6 | 1 | 7
10 | (United States) D Pate | 3 | 6 | 5
(India) V Amritraj | 3 | 2
(United States) M Flur | 6 | 6
(Chile) R Acuña | 3 | 4
2 | (Sweden) A Järryd | 6 | 6

Third round
6 | (Sweden) J Nyström | 3 | 6 | 7
(United States) T Moor | 6 | 4 | 6
(United States) M Flur | 5 | 4
2 | (Sweden) A Järryd | 7 | 6

Quarterfinals
6 | (Sweden) J Nyström | 6 | 6
2 | (Sweden) A Järryd | 2 | 1
