= 1981 Bristol Open – Singles =

Singles
- 1981 Bristol Open

Final
- Champion: (Australia) Mark Edmondson
- Runner-up: (United States) Roscoe Tanner
- Score: 6–3, 5–7, 6–4

Details
- Draw: 32
- Seeds: 8

Events
Singles	Doubles
← 1972 ·	Bristol Open	· 1982 →

Mark Edmondson won the title, defeating Roscoe Tanner 6–3, 5–7, 6–4 in the final.

== Seeds ==
1. (United States) Roscoe Tanner (final)
2. (South Africa) Johan Kriek (semifinals)
3. (United States) Stan Smith (second round)
4. (Australia) Paul McNamee (semifinals)
5. (United States) Bill Scanlon (second round)
6. (United Kingdom) Buster Mottram (second round)
7. (Australia) Phil Dent (quarterfinals)
8. (New Zealand) Chris Lewis (first round)

== Draw ==
=== Key ===
- Q = Qualifier
- WC = Wild card
- LL = Lucky loser
- Alt = Alternate
- SE = Special exempt
- PR = Protected ranking
- ITF = ITF entry
- JE = Junior exempt
- w/o = Walkover
- r = Retired
- d = Defaulted
- SR = Special ranking

=== Finals ===
Semifinals
1	(United States) Roscoe Tanner	6	6
4	(Australia) Paul McNamee	4	4
(Australia) Mark Edmondson	6	6
2	(South Africa) Johan Kriek	2	4

Final
1	(United States) Roscoe Tanner	3	7	4
(Australia) Mark Edmondson	6	5	6

=== Top half ===
First round
1	(United States) R Tanner	7	6
(Australia) R Frawley	6	4
(United States) R Meyer	6	6
(Australia) J Fitzgerald	7	7
(United States) H Pfister	5	3
(New Zealand) O Parun	7	6
(Australia) P Kronk	1	r
7	(Australia) P Dent	6
4	(Australia) P McNamee	7	6
(Romania) I Năstase	6	4
(United States) R Hightower	2	6	6
(United States) J Austin	6	3	2
(United States) A Pattison	4	4
(United States) T Mayotte	6	6
(France) C Roger-Vasselin	2	2
6	(United Kingdom) B Mottram	6	6

Second round
1	(United States) R Tanner	4	6	6
(Australia) J Fitzgerald	6	4	4
(New Zealand) O Parun	3	4
7	(Australia) P Dent	6	6
4	(Australia) P McNamee	6	6
(United States) R Hightower	3	4
(United States) T Mayotte	7	6
6	(United Kingdom) B Mottram	6	4

Quarterfinals
1	(United States) R Tanner	6	6	13
7	(Australia) P Dent	7	3	11
4	(Australia) P McNamee	5	6	8
(United States) T Mayotte	7	0	6

Semifinals
1	(United States) R Tanner	6	6
4	(Australia) P McNamee	4	4

=== Bottom half ===
First round
8	(New Zealand) C Lewis	2	2
(Australia) M Edmondson	6	6
(Egypt) I El Shafei	6	6
(United States) T Giammalva	4	2
(New Zealand) R Simpson	7	6
(United States) J DiLouie	6	3
(South Africa) B Mitton	5	4
3	(United States) S Smith	7	6
5	(United States) B Scanlon	6	6
(Austria) R Reininger	3	0
(United States) T Gullikson	7	6
(United States) N Saviano	6	1
(United States) B Walts	7	1	1
(Australia) D Carter	5	6	6
(France) T Tulasne	4	4
2	(South Africa) J Kriek	6	6

Second round
(Australia) M Edmondson	6	4	6
(Egypt) I El Shafei	3	6	0
(New Zealand) R Simpson	6	4	6
3	(United States) S Smith	3	6	2
5	(United States) B Scanlon	5	1
(United States) T Gullikson	7	6
(Australia) D Carter	2	5
2	(South Africa) J Kriek	6	7

Quarterfinals
(Australia) M Edmondson	6	6
(New Zealand) R Simpson	2	0
(United States) T Gullikson	5	4
2	(South Africa) J Kriek	7	6

Semifinals
(Australia) M Edmondson	6	6
2	(South Africa) J Kriek	2	4
