= 1984 ATP Championship – Singles =

Singles
- 1984 ATP Championship

Final
- Champion: (Sweden) Mats Wilander
- Runner-up: (Sweden) Anders Järryd
- Score: 7–6^{(7–4)}, 6–3

Details
- Draw: 64 (5WC/8Q)
- Seeds: 16

Events
Singles	Doubles
- Cincinnati Masters

Mats Wilander successfully defended his title, by defeating Anders Järryd 7–6^{(7–4)}, 6–3 in the final.

== Seeds ==
1. (United States) John McEnroe (first round)
2. (United States) Jimmy Connors (semifinals)
3. (Sweden) Mats Wilander (champion)
4. (United States) Aaron Krickstein (first round)
5. (Sweden) Anders Järryd (final)
6. (Australia) Pat Cash (first round)
7. (Argentina) Guillermo Vilas (second round)
8. (Sweden) Joakim Nyström (semifinals)
9. (France) Henri Leconte (first round)
10. (United States) Scott Davis (first round)
11. (Sweden) Stefan Edberg (quarterfinals)
12. (Australia) Paul McNamee (quarterfinals)
13. (United States) Leif Shiras (first round)
14. (United States) John Sadri (quarterfinals)
15. (Hungary) Balázs Taróczy (second round)
16. (United States) Brian Teacher (second round)

== Draw ==
Key

- Q = Qualifier
- WC = Wild card
- LL = Lucky loser
- Alt = Alternate
- ITF = ITF entry
- PR = Protected ranking
- SR = Special ranking
- SE = Special exempt
- JE = Junior exempt
- JR = Junior Accelerator Programme entrant
- CO = College Accelerator Programme entrant
- NG = Next Gen Accelerator Program entrant
- w/o = Walkover
- r = Retired
- d = Defaulted

=== Finals ===
Quarterfinals
12	(Australia) Paul McNamee	2	6
5	(Sweden) Anders Järryd	6	7
Q	(United States) Dan Cassidy	7	3	2
8	(Sweden) Joakim Nyström	6	6	6
14	(United States) John Sadri	7	6	1
3	(Sweden) Mats Wilander	6	7	6
11	(Sweden) Stefan Edberg	3	6	6
2/WC	(United States) Jimmy Connors	6	4	7

Semifinals
5	(Sweden) Anders Järryd	7	6
8	(Sweden) Joakim Nyström	5	4
3	(Sweden) Mats Wilander	7^{7}	1	7^{7}
2/WC	(United States) Jimmy Connors	6^{5}	6	6^{4}

Final
5	(Sweden) Anders Järryd	6^{4}	3
3	(Sweden) Mats Wilander	7^{7}	6

=== Top half ===
==== Section 1 ====
First round
1	(United States) J McEnroe	7	2	3
(India) V Amritraj	6	6	6
(United States) H Pfister	3	2
(India) R Krishnan	6	6
Q	(United States) S McCain	6	1	2
(United States) B Gottfried	4	6	6
(South Africa) D Visser	6	5	3
12	(Australia) P McNamee	3	7	6
9	(France) H Leconte	6	5	3
(Israel) S Glickstein	1	7	6
(United States) S Denton	7	4	2
(United States) V Van Patten	5	6	6
(Australia) B Drewett	3	6	6
Q	(United States) A Kohlberg	6	4	7
Q	(United States) E Iskersky	5	2
5	(Sweden) A Järryd	7	6

Second round
(India) V Amritraj	2	6	2
(India) R Krishnan	6	4	6
(United States) B Gottfried	3	1
12	(Australia) P McNamee	6	6
(Israel) S Glickstein	4	6	6
(United States) V Van Patten	6	2	3
Q	(United States) A Kohlberg	0	2
5	(Sweden) A Järryd	6	6

Third round
(India) R Krishnan	6	7	6
12	(Australia) P McNamee	7	6	7
(Israel) S Glickstein	3	2
5	(Sweden) A Järryd	6	6

Quarterfinals
12	(Australia) P McNamee	2	6
5	(Sweden) A Järryd	6	7

==== Section 2 ====
First round
4	(United States) A Krickstein	6	1
Q	(Israel) S Perkiss	7	6
(United States) T Moor	1	2
Q	(United States) D Cassidy	6	6
WC	(Paraguay) F González	6	5	4
(United States) M Purcell	4	7	6
(United Kingdom) C Dowdeswell	2	1
16	(United States) B Teacher	6	6
13	(United States) L Shiras	6	4
(New Zealand) R Simpson	7	6
(United States) L Bourne	6	3
WC	(United States) D Tarr	7	6
(Australia) W Masur	3	6	4
(United States) G Holmes	6	4	6
(United States) S Giammalva Jr.	1	2
8	(Sweden) J Nyström	6	6

Second round
Q	(Israel) S Perkiss	3	4
Q	(United States) D Cassidy	6	6
(United States) M Purcell	4	7	7
16	(United States) B Teacher	6	6	5
(New Zealand) R Simpson	4	6	6
WC	(United States) D Tarr	6	3	7
(United States) G Holmes	5	4
8	(Sweden) J Nyström	7	6

Third round
Q	(United States) D Cassidy	7	6
(United States) M Purcell	6	4
WC	(United States) D Tarr	3	2
8	(Sweden) J Nyström	6	6

Quarterfinals
Q	(United States) D Cassidy	7	3	2
8	(Sweden) J Nyström	6	6	6

=== Bottom half ===
==== Section 3 ====
First round
7	(Argentina) G Vilas	7	6	7
(United States) T Gullikson	6	7	6
(Nigeria) N Odizor	6	3	4
(United States) R Harmon	3	6	6
WC	(Republic of Ireland) M Doyle	7	6
(Brazil) C Motta	5	2
(United States) J Brown	3	7	1
14	(United States) J Sadri	6	6	6
10	(United States) S Davis	6	4	0
(Australia) J Fitzgerald	4	6	6
(United States) S Meister	7	1	1
(Sweden) T Högstedt	6	6	6
(Australia) M Edmondson	6	1
WC	(Australia) J Alexander	7	6
(United States) F Buehning	1	2
3	(Sweden) M Wilander	6	6

Second round
7	(Argentina) G Vilas	4	3
(United States) R Harmon	6	6
WC	(Republic of Ireland) M Doyle	3	5
14	(United States) J Sadri	6	7
(Australia) J Fitzgerald	4	4
(Sweden) T Högstedt	6	6
WC	(Australia) J Alexander	3	1
3	(Sweden) M Wilander	6	6

Third round
(United States) R Harmon	4	1
14	(United States) J Sadri	6	6
(Sweden) T Högstedt	2	3
3	(Sweden) M Wilander	6	6

Quarterfinals
14	(United States) J Sadri	7	6	1
3	(Sweden) M Wilander	6	7	6

==== Section 4 ====
First round
6	(Australia) P Cash	4	6
(United States) B Testerman	6	7
(United Kingdom) J Lloyd	6	6
Q	(Socialist Federal Republic of Yugoslavia) S Živojinović	4	2
(United States) M Davis	1	6	6
(United States) S Mayer	6	2	3
(United States) T Gullikson	3	2
11	(Sweden) S Edberg	6	6
15	(Hungary) B Tarózcy	6	6
(Italy) G Ocleppo	2	4
Q	(Sweden) P Hjertquist	2	4
(United States) P Fleming	6	6
(United States) M Bauer	6	6
Q	(Austria) P Feigl	4	1
(United States) R Tanner	1	3
2/WC	(United States) J Connors	6	6

Second round
(United States) B Testerman	2	6	4
(United Kingdom) J Lloyd	6	4	6
(United States) M Davis	6	4	6
11	(Sweden) S Edberg	4	6	7
15	(Hungary) B Tarózcy	6	3	2
(United States) P Fleming	3	6	6
(United States) M Bauer	1	2
2/WC	(United States) J Connors	6	6

Third round
(United Kingdom) J Lloyd	5	1
11	(Sweden) S Edberg	7	6
(United States) P Fleming	1	4
2/WC	(United States) J Connors	6	6

Quarterfinals
11	(Sweden) S Edberg	3	6	6
2/WC	(United States) J Connors	6	4	7
