= 1983 West of England Championships – Singles =

Tennis tournament

Singles
- 1983 West of England Championships

Final
- Champion: (United States) Johan Kriek
- Runner-up: (United States) Tom Gullikson
- Score: 7–6, 7–5

Details
- Draw: 32
- Seeds: 8

Events
| Singles | Doubles |
- Bristol Open

John Alexander was the defending champion, but lost in the first round this year.

First-seeded Johan Kriek won the title, defeating Tom Gullikson 7–6, 7–5 in the final.

== Seeds ==
1. (United States) Johan Kriek (champion)
2. (United States) Hank Pfister (second round)
3. (United States) Brian Teacher (quarterfinals)
4. (Australia) Mark Edmondson (first round)
5. (United States) Tim Mayotte (first round)
6. (Australia) John Alexander (first round)
7. (Brazil) Marcos Hocevar (quarterfinals)
8. (United States) Mark Dickson (first round)

== Draw ==
Key

- Q = Qualifier
- WC = Wild card
- LL = Lucky loser
- Alt = Alternate
- ITF = ITF entry
- PR = Protected ranking
- SR = Special ranking
- SE = Special exempt
- JE = Junior exempt
- JR = Junior Accelerator Programme entrant
- CO = College Accelerator Programme entrant
- NG = Next Gen Accelerator Program entrant
- w/o = Walkover
- r = Retired
- d = Defaulted

=== Finals ===
Semifinals
1 | (United States) Johan Kriek | 6 | 1 | 7
Q | (United States) Lloyd Bourne | 2 | 6 | 5
(India) Ramesh Krishnan | 4 | 6
(United States) Tom Gullikson | 6 | 7

Final
1 | (United States) Johan Kriek | 7 | 7
(United States) Tom Gullikson | 6 | 5

=== Top half ===
First round
1 | (United States) J Kriek | 6 | 6
(United States) S Smith | 2 | 3
(Romania) I Năstase | 1 | 7 | 6
(Australia) P Cash | 6 | 5 | 3
(Chile) R Acuña | 6 | 6
(United States) M De Palmer | 3 | 4
(Nigeria) N Odizor | 7 | 6
5 | (United States) T Mayotte | 6 | 4
3 | (United States) B Teacher | 6 | 6
(Chile) J Fillol | 4 | 3
(Brazil) G Barbosa | 7 | 6 | 3
(Australia) W Masur | 6 | 7 | 6
(United States) D Gitlin | 7 | 7
(Australia) C Johnstone | 5 | 6
Q | (United States) L Bourne | 7 | 7
8 | (United States) M Dickson | 6 | 5

Second round
1 | (United States) J Kriek | 6 | 6
(Romania) I Năstase | 3 | 1
(Chile) R Acuña | 6 | 6
(Nigeria) N Odizor | 3 | 1
3 | (United States) B Teacher | 6 | 6 | 6
(Australia) W Masur | 7 | 4 | 3
(United States) D Gitlin | 4 | 6 | 1
Q | (United States) L Bourne | 6 | 4 | 6

Quarterfinals
1 | (United States) J Kriek | 6 | 6 | 6
(Chile) R Acuña | 4 | 7 | 4
3 | (United States) B Teacher | 3 | 7 | 9
Q | (United States) L Bourne | 6 | 6 | 11

Semifinals
1 | (United States) J Kriek | 6 | 1 | 7
Q | (United States) L Bourne | 2 | 6 | 5

=== Bottom half ===
First round
6 | (Australia) J Alexander | 5 | 2
(United States) T Wilkison | 7 | 6
(Australia) J Fitzgerald | 7 | 6
Q | (United Kingdom) J Bates | 5 | 1
(United States) R Harmon | 6 | 7
(Republic of Ireland) M Doyle | 4 | 6
(India) R Krishnan | 6 | 6
4 | (Australia) M Edmondson | 4 | 3
7 | (Brazil) M Hocevar | 6 | 6 | 6
(Brazil) J Soares | 3 | 7 | 4
(United States) M Bauer | 6 | 3 | 14
(United States) B Testerman | 3 | 6 | 12
(United States) T Gullikson | 6 | 6 | 6
Q | (Australia) R Frawley | 7 | 1 | 3
Q | (United Kingdom) J Smith | 1 | 6
2 | (United States) H Pfister | 6 | 7

Second round
(United States) T Wilkison | 4 | 5
(Australia) J Fitzgerald | 6 | 7
(United States) R Harmon | 5 | 0
(India) R Krishnan | 7 | 6
7 | (Brazil) M Hocevar | 7 | 7
(United States) M Bauer | 6 | 6
(United States) T Gullikson | 3 | 6 | 10
2 | (United States) H Pfister | 6 | 2 | 8

Quarterfinals
(Australia) J Fitzgerald | 3 | 3
(India) R Krishnan | 6 | 6
7 | (Brazil) M Hocevar | 4 | 4
(United States) T Gullikson | 6 | 6

Semifinals
(India) R Krishnan | 4 | 6
(United States) T Gullikson | 6 | 7
