= 1983 West of England Championships =

- Date: 13–19 June
- Edition: 4th
- Category: Grand Prix
- Draw: 32S / 16D
- Prize money: $100,000
- Surface: Grass / outdoor
- Location: Bristol, England

Champions

Singles
- (United States) Johan Kriek

Doubles
- (Australia) John Alexander / (Australia) John Fitzgerald
← 1982 ·	Bristol Open	· 1984 →

The 1983 West of England Championships was a men's tennis tournament played on outdoor grass courts in Bristol, England that was part of the 1982 Volvo Grand Prix. It was the fourth edition of the tournament and was played from 13 June until 19 June 1983. First-seeded Johan Kriek won the singles title.

== Finals ==
=== Singles ===
(United States) Johan Kriek defeated (United States) Tom Gullikson 7–6, 7–5

- It was Kriek's 2nd singles title of the year and the 9th of his career.

=== Doubles ===
(Australia) John Alexander / (Australia) John Fitzgerald defeated (United States) Tom Gullikson / (United States) Johan Kriek 7–5, 6–4

- It was Alexander's 2nd title of the year and the 35th of his career. It was Fitzgerald's 1st title of the year and the 7th of his career.
