= 1981 Bristol Open – Doubles =

Doubles
- 1981 Bristol Open

Final
- Champions: (United States) Billy Martin (New Zealand) Russell Simpson
- Runners-up: (United States) John Austin (South Africa) Johan Kriek
- Score: 6–3, 4–6, 6–4

Details
- Draw: 14
- Seeds: 4

Events
Singles	Doubles
← 1972 ·	Bristol Open	· 1982 →

The event was being held for the first time since 1972.

Billy Martin and Russell Simpson won the title, defeating John Austin and Johan Kriek 6–3, 4–6, 6–4 in the final.

== Seeds ==
1. (United States) Sandy Mayer / (South Africa) Frew McMillan (first round, withdrew)
2. (United States) Tim Gullikson / (South Africa) Bernard Mitton (first round)
3. (United States) Jai DiLouie / (United States) Robert Van't Hof (semifinals)
4. (United States) Nick Saviano / (United States) Bill Scanlon (semifinals)

== Draw ==
=== Key ===
- Q = Qualifier
- WC = Wild card
- LL = Lucky loser
- Alt = Alternate
- ITF = ITF entry
- PR = Protected ranking
- SR = Special ranking
- SE = Special exempt
- JE = Junior exempt
- JR = Junior Accelerator Programme entrant
- CO = College Accelerator Programme entrant
- NG = Next Gen Accelerator Program entrant
- w/o = Walkover
- r = Retired
- d = Defaulted

=== Draw ===
First round
1	(United States) S Mayer (South Africa) F McMillan
(Sweden) A Järryd (Sweden) S Simonsson	w/o
(United States) J Austin (South Africa) J Kriek	6	6
(Egypt) I El Shafei (Austria) R Reininger	4	1
(Australia) M Edmondson (Australia) P Kronk	6	6	6
(France) C Roger-Vasselin (France) T Tulasne	7	3	4
4	(United States) N Saviano (United States) B Scanlon	6	7
(United States) T Mayotte (United States) R Meyer	4	6
(United States) T Giammalva (United Kingdom) B Mottram	7	6
(United States) A Pattison (United States) B Walts	6	3
(United States) B Martin (New Zealand) R Simpson	6	6	7
2	(United States) T Gullikson (South Africa) B Mitton	4	7	5

Quarterfinals
(Sweden) A Järryd (Sweden) S Simonsson	0	3
(United States) J Austin (South Africa) J Kriek	6	6
(Australia) M Edmondson (Australia) P Kronk	6	4
3	(United States) J DiLouie (United States) R Van't Hof	7	6
4	(United States) N Saviano (United States) B Scanlon	4	6	6
(United States) T Giammalva (United Kingdom) B Mottram	6	3	4
(Australia) B Drewett (Australia) J Fitzgerald	7	3	2
(United States) B Martin (New Zealand) R Simpson	6	6	6

Semifinals
(United States) J Austin (South Africa) J Kriek	3	6	12
3	(United States) J DiLouie (United States) R Van't Hof	6	3	10
4	(United States) N Saviano (United States) B Scanlon	6	6
(United States) B Martin (New Zealand) R Simpson	7	7

Final
(United States) J Austin (South Africa) J Kriek	3	6	4
(United States) B Martin (New Zealand) R Simpson	6	4	6
