= 1985 WCT Houston Shootout – Singles =

Singles
- 1985 WCT Houston Shootout

Final
- Champion: (United States) John McEnroe
- Runner-up: (South Africa) Kevin Curren
- Score: 7–5, 6–1, 7–6^{(7–4)}

Details
- Draw: 32 (3WC/4Q)
- Seeds: 8

Events
Singles	Doubles
- WCT Houston Shootout

In the inaugural edition of the tournament, John McEnroe won the title by defeating Kevin Curren 7–5, 6–1, 7–6^{(7–4)} in the final.

== Seeds ==
1. (United States) John McEnroe (champion)
2. (South Africa) Kevin Curren (final)
3. (United States) Vitas Gerulaitis (1st round)
4. (United States) Jimmy Arias (2nd round)
5. (United States) Tim Mayotte (quarterfinals)
6. (United States) Brad Gilbert (quarterfinals)
7. (United States) Greg Holmes (1st round)
8. (India) Ramesh Krishnan (1st round)

== Draw ==
Key

- Q = Qualifier
- WC = Wild card
- LL = Lucky loser
- Alt = Alternate
- ITF = ITF entry
- PR = Protected ranking
- SR = Special ranking
- SE = Special exempt
- JE = Junior exempt
- JR = Junior Accelerator Programme entrant
- CO = College Accelerator Programme entrant
- NG = Next Gen Accelerator Program entrant
- w/o = Walkover
- r = Retired
- d = Defaulted

=== Final ===
Final
1	(United States) John McEnroe	7	6	7^{7}
2	(South Africa) Kevin Curren	5	1	6^{4}

=== Top half ===
1st Round
1	(United States) John McEnroe	6	6	7
(Poland) Wojciech Fibak	2	7	5
(United States) Tom Gullikson	6	6
Q	(United States) Brad Pearce	3	4
(United States) David Pate	6	6
WC	(United States) Tony Giammalva	2	1
6	(United States) Brad Gilbert	2	6	6
Q	(Socialist Federal Republic of Yugoslavia) Slobodan Živojinović	6	1	3
(United States) Jay Lapidus	6	3	7
3/WC	(United States) Vitas Gerulaitis	3	6	6
(United States) Leif Shiras	7	6
(South Africa) Danie Visser	5	4
(Sweden) Jan Gunnarsson	7	6
(Switzerland) Zoltán Kuhárszky	6	3
(United States) Peter Fleming	6	6
7	(United States) Greg Holmes	2	1

2nd Round
1	(United States) John McEnroe	6	6
(United States) Tom Gullikson	4	3
(United States) David Pate	4	2
6	(United States) Brad Gilbert	6	6
(United States) Jay Lapidus	4	6	6
(United States) Leif Shiras	6	2	7
(Sweden) Jan Gunnarsson	3	4
(United States) Peter Fleming	6	6

Quarterfinals
1	(United States) John McEnroe	6	6
6	(United States) Brad Gilbert	3	3
(United States) Leif Shiras	3	3
(United States) Peter Fleming	6	6

Semifinals
1	(United States) John McEnroe	6	6
(United States) Peter Fleming	4	0

=== Bottom half ===
1st Round
(Israel) Shahar Perkiss	6	3	6
8	(India) Ramesh Krishnan	4	6	2
(United States) Terry Moor	3	6	6
Q	(United States) Andy Kohlberg	6	1	2
(United States) Mark Dickson	6	6
(United States) Sammy Giammalva	3	2
4	(United States) Jimmy Arias	6	6
(United States) Dan Cassidy	3	4
5	(United States) Tim Mayotte	6	6
(United States) John Sadri	3	4
(United States) Mike Bauer	6	7
(Germany) Michael Westphal	4	5
Q	(United States) Paul Annacone	6	6	6
(United States) Tim Wilkison	3	7	3
2	(South Africa) Kevin Curren	6	6
WC	(United States) Steve Denton	4	4

2nd Round
(Israel) Shahar Perkiss	6	6	6
(United States) Terry Moor	7	4	4
(United States) Mark Dickson	6	4	7
4	(United States) Jimmy Arias	3	6	6
5	(United States) Tim Mayotte	6	6
(United States) Mike Bauer	4	2
Q	(United States) Paul Annacone	4	6
2	(South Africa) Kevin Curren	6	7

Quarterfinals
(Israel) Shahar Perkiss	7	6
(United States) Mark Dickson	6	0
5	(United States) Tim Mayotte	5	6
2	(South Africa) Kevin Curren	7	7

Semifinals
(Israel) Shahar Perkiss	2	2
2	(South Africa) Kevin Curren	6	6
