= 1972 Bristol Open – Doubles =

Doubles
- 1972 Bristol Open

Final
- Champions: (South Africa) Bob Hewitt (South Africa) Frew McMillan
- Runners-up: (United States) Clark Graebner (Australia) Lew Hoad
- Score: 6–3, 6–2

Details
- Draw: 17

Events
Singles	Doubles
← 1971 ·	Bristol Open	· 1981 →

Bob Hewitt and Frew McMillan won the title, defeating Clark Graebner and Lew Hoad 6–3, 6–2 in the final.

== Draw ==
=== Key ===
- Q = Qualifier
- WC = Wild card
- LL = Lucky loser
- Alt = Alternate
- ITF = ITF entry
- PR = Protected ranking
- SR = Special ranking
- SE = Special exempt
- JE = Junior exempt
- JR = Junior Accelerator Programme entrant
- CO = College Accelerator Programme entrant
- NG = Next Gen Accelerator Program entrant
- w/o = Walkover
- r = Retired
- d = Defaulted

=== Finals ===
Semifinals
(South Africa) Bob Hewitt (South Africa) Frew McMillan	6	6
(Japan) Jun Kamiwazumi (Japan) Toshiro Sakai	4	1
(United States) Jim McManus (United States) Jim Osborne	1	4
(United States) Clark Graebner (Australia) Lew Hoad	6	6

Final
(South Africa) Bob Hewitt (South Africa) Frew McMillan	6	6
(United States) Clark Graebner (Australia) Lew Hoad	3	2

=== Top half ===
First round
(South Africa) P Cramer (United States) D Dell	6	6
(Australia) C Dibley (Australia) G Masters	4	4

Second round
(South Africa) B Hewitt (South Africa) F McMillan	6	6
(France) J-B Chanfreau (France) JL Rouyer	4	4
(South Africa) R Moore (New Zealand) O Parun	6	2	6
(United Kingdom) J Lloyd (United Kingdom) J Paish	3	6	3
(Chile) P Cornejo (Chile) J Fillol	9	9
(France) P Dominguez (France) P Proisy	8	8
(Japan) J Kamiwazumi (Japan) T Sakai	7	8	6
(South Africa) P Cramer (United States) D Dell	5	9	3

Quarterfinals
(South Africa) B Hewitt (South Africa) F McMillan	6	7
(South Africa) R Moore (New Zealand) O Parun	3	5
(Chile) P Cornejo (Chile) J Fillol	4	8
(Japan) J Kamiwazumi (Japan) T Sakai	6	9

Semifinals
(South Africa) B Hewitt (South Africa) F McMillan	6	6
(Japan) J Kamiwazumi (Japan) T Sakai	4	1

=== Bottom half ===
First round

Second round
(Greece) N Kalogeropoulos (United States) A Pattison	7	6
(United Kingdom) J de Mendoza (United Kingdom) S Warboys	5	3
(United States) J McManus (United States) J Osborne	7	6	6
(Brazil) T Koch (Pakistan) H Rahim	9	3	4
(United States) J Connors (United States) A Olmedo	DEF
(Australia) R Case (Australia) J Cooper
(United States) C Graebner (Australia) L Hoad	6	6
(Rhodesia) H Irvine (Chile) J Pinto-Bravo	2	3

Quarterfinals
(Greece) N Kalogeropoulos (United States) A Pattison	8	6	1
(United States) J McManus (United States) J Osborne	9	3	6
(United States) J Connors (United States) A Olmedo
(United States) C Graebner (Australia) L Hoad	DEF

Semifinals
(United States) J McManus (United States) J Osborne	1	4
(United States) C Graebner (Australia) L Hoad	6	6
