= 1986 WCT Houston Shootout =

- Date: November 17–23
- Edition: 2nd
- Category: Grand Prix (WCT)
- Draw: 32S / 16D
- Prize money: $220,000
- Surface: Carpet
- Location: Houston, United States

Champions

Singles
- (Socialist Federal Republic of Yugoslavia) Slobodan Živojinović

Doubles
- (Chile) Ricardo Acuña / (United States) Brad Pearce
- WCT Houston Shootout

The 1986 WCT Houston Shootout was a men's tennis tournament played on indoor carpet courts. It was a World Championship Tennis event which was part of the 1986 Nabisco Grand Prix, as the two organisations had reunited. It was the second and last edition and was played in Houston, United States from November 17 through November 23, 1986. Sixth-seeded Slobodan Živojinović, who was added to the main draw with a wildcard, won the singles title.

== Finals ==
=== Singles ===
(Socialist Federal Republic of Yugoslavia) Slobodan Živojinović defeated (United States) Scott Davis, 6–1, 4–6, 6–3

- It was Živojinoviće's only singles title of the year and the 1st of his career.

=== Doubles ===
(Chile) Ricardo Acuña / (United States) Brad Pearce defeated (United States) Chip Hooper / (United States) Mike Leach, 6–4, 7–5

- It was Acuña's only doubles title of the year and the 2nd of his career. It was Pearce's only doubles title of the year and the 1st of his career.
