= 1985 ATP Championship =

- Date: August 19–25
- Edition: 84th
- Category: Grand Prix circuit
- Draw: 64S / 32D
- Prize money: $300,000
- Surface: Hard / outdoor
- Location: Mason, Ohio, U.S.
- Venue: Lindner Family Tennis Center

Champions

Singles
- (West Germany) Boris Becker

Doubles
- (Sweden) Stefan Edberg / (Sweden) Anders Järryd
- Cincinnati Masters

The 1985 ATP Championship, also known as the Cincinnati Open, was a tennis tournament played on outdoor hard courts at the Lindner Family Tennis Center in Mason, Ohio in the United States that was part of the 1985 Nabisco Grand Prix. The tournament was held from August 19 through August 25, 1985. Fourth-seeded Boris Becker won the singles title.

== Finals ==
=== Singles ===
(West Germany) Boris Becker defeated (Sweden) Mats Wilander 6–4, 6–2

- It was Becker's 3rd singles title of the year and of his career.

=== Doubles ===
(Sweden) Stefan Edberg / (Sweden) Anders Järryd defeated (Sweden) Joakim Nyström / (Sweden) Mats Wilander 4–6, 6–2, 6–3
