= 1982 Bristol Open =

Tennis tournament

- Date: 14–19 June
- Edition: 3rd
- Category: Grand Prix
- Draw: 32S / 16D
- Prize money: $100,000
- Surface: Grass / outdoor
- Location: Bristol, England

Champions

Singles
- (Australia) John Alexander

Doubles
- (United States) Tim Gullikson / (United States) Tom Gullikson
← 1981 ·	Bristol Open	· 1983 →

The 1982 Bristol Open, also known by its sponsored name Lambert & Butler Championships, was a men's tennis tournament played on outdoor grass courts in Bristol, England that was part of the 1982 Volvo Grand Prix. It was the third edition of the tournament and was played from 14 June until 19 June 1982. Unseeded John Alexander won the singles title.

== Finals ==
=== Singles ===
(Australia) John Alexander defeated (United States) Tim Mayotte 6–3, 6–4

- It was Alexander's 1st singles title of the year and the 5th of his career.

=== Doubles ===
(United States) Tim Gullikson / (United States) Tom Gullikson defeated (Australia) Mark Edmondson / (Australia) Kim Warwick 6–4, 7–6

- It was Tim Gullikson's 2nd title of the year and the 13th of his career. It was Tom Gullikson's 3rd title of the year and the 11th of his career.
