= 1984 ATP Championship =

- Date: August 20–26, 1984
- Edition: 83rd
- Category: Grand Prix circuit
- Draw: 64S / 32D
- Prize money: $300,000
- Surface: Hard / outdoor
- Location: Mason, Ohio, U.S.
- Venue: Lindner Family Tennis Center

Champions

Singles
- (Sweden) Mats Wilander

Doubles
- (Paraguay) Francisco González / (United States) Matt Mitchell
- Cincinnati Masters

The 1984 ATP Championship, also known as the Cincinnati Open, was a men's tennis tournament played on outdoor hard courts at the Lindner Family Tennis Center in Mason, Ohio in the United States that was part of the 1984 Volvo Grand Prix. It was the 83rd edition of the tournament and was held from August 20 through August 26, 1984. Third-seeded Mats Wilander won the singles title.

== Finals ==
=== Singles ===
(Sweden) Mats Wilander defeated (Sweden) Anders Järryd 7–6^{(7–4)}, 6–3

- It was Wilander's 1st singles title of the year and the 14th of his career.

=== Doubles ===
(Paraguay) Francisco González / (United States) Matt Mitchell defeated (United States) Sandy Mayer / (Hungary) Balázs Taróczy 4–6, 6–3, 7–6
