= 1972 Bristol Open – Singles =

Singles
- 1972 Bristol Open

Final
- Champion: (South Africa) Bob Hewitt
- Runner-up: (United States) Alejandro Olmedo
- Score: 6–4, 6–3

Details
- Draw: 32

Events
Singles	Doubles
← 1971 ·	Bristol Open	· 1981 →

Bob Hewitt won the title, defeating Alejandro Olmedo 6–4, 6–3 in the final.

== Draw ==
=== Key ===
- Q = Qualifier
- WC = Wild card
- LL = Lucky loser
- Alt = Alternate
- SE = Special exempt
- PR = Protected ranking
- ITF = ITF entry
- JE = Junior exempt
- w/o = Walkover
- r = Retired
- d = Defaulted
- SR = Special ranking

=== Finals ===
Semifinals
(United States) Alejandro Olmedo	6	9
(France) François Jauffret	4	8
(United States) Clark Graebner	6	4	4
(South Africa) Bob Hewitt	4	6	6

Final
(United States) Alejandro Olmedo	4	3
(South Africa) Bob Hewitt	6	6

=== Top half ===
First round
(France) P Barthès	6	9
(Chile) J Pinto-Bravo	2	8
(United States) A Olmedo	1	6	6
(Rhodesia) H Irvine	6	4	3
(Japan) J Kamiwazumi	6	9
(Sweden) ON Bengtson	3	8
(South Africa) P Cramer	2	2
(United Kingdom) J de Mendoza	6	6
(Chile) J Fillol	6	9
(United States) J McManus	4	7
(France) F Jauffret	7	9
(Japan) Toshisuke Sakai	5	7
(United States) J Connors	4	3
(United Kingdom) D Lloyd	6	6
(Australia) L Hoad	3	6	6
(Australia) C Dibley	6	3	8

Second round
(France) P Barthès	2	3
(United States) A Olmedo	6	6
(Japan) J Kamiwazumi	5	3
(United Kingdom) J de Mendoza	7	6
(Chile) J Fillol	3	7	3
(France) F Jauffret	6	5	6
(United Kingdom) D Lloyd	1	1
(Australia) C Dibley	6	6

Quarterfinals
(United States) A Olmedo	6	6
(United Kingdom) J de Mendoza	4	4
(France) F Jauffret	8	3	6
(Australia) C Dibley	6	6	3

Semifinals
(United States) A Olmedo	6	9
(France) F Jauffret	4	8

=== Bottom half ===
First round
(United Kingdom) J Paish	9	9
(France) JL Rouyer	8	7
(United Kingdom) S Warboys	3	6	6
(France) P Proisy	6	3	2
(South Africa) R Moore	3	4
(Brazil) T Koch	6	6
(Australia) J Cooper	4	4
(United States) C Graebner	6	6
(South Africa) F McMillan	9	4	5
(Pakistan) H Rahim	7	6	7
(Australia) G Masters	3	8
(United States) A Pattison	6	8
(Australia) R Case	6	6
(France) P Dominguez	4	3
(New Zealand) O Parun	5	6	4
(South Africa) B Hewitt	7	3	6

Second round
(United Kingdom) J Paish	6	9
(United Kingdom) S Warboys	3	8
(Brazil) T Koch	1	6	5
(United States) C Graebner	6	4	7
(Pakistan) H Rahim	8	4
(United States) A Pattison	9	6
(Australia) R Case	7	4	1^{r}
(South Africa) B Hewitt	5	6	3

Quarterfinals
(United Kingdom) J Paish	5	3
(United States) C Graebner	7	6
(United States) A Pattison	6	1
(South Africa) B Hewitt	8	6

Semifinals
(United States) C Graebner	6	4	4
(South Africa) B Hewitt	4	6	6
