= 1982 Bristol Open – Doubles =

Doubles
- 1982 Bristol Open

Final
- Champions: (United States) Tim Gullikson (United States) Tom Gullikson
- Runners-up: (Australia) Mark Edmondson (Australia) Kim Warwick
- Score: 6–4, 7–6

Details
- Draw: 16
- Seeds: 4

Events
| Singles | Doubles |
- Bristol Open

Billy Martin and Russell Simpson were the defending champions, but Martin did not participate this year. Simpson partnered Lloyd Bourne, losing in the first round.

Tim Gullikson and Tom Gullikson won the title, defeating John Austin and Johan Kriek 6–4, 7–6 in the final.

== Seeds ==
1. (Australia) Mark Edmondson / (Australia) Kim Warwick (final)
2. (United States) Tim Gullikson / (United States) Tom Gullikson (champions)
3. (United States) John Austin / (United States) Johan Kriek (first round)
4. (United States) Stan Smith / (United States) Roscoe Tanner (quarterfinals)

== Draw ==
Key

- Q = Qualifier
- WC = Wild card
- LL = Lucky loser
- Alt = Alternate
- ITF = ITF entry
- PR = Protected ranking
- SR = Special ranking
- SE = Special exempt
- JE = Junior exempt
- JR = Junior Accelerator Programme entrant
- CO = College Accelerator Programme entrant
- NG = Next Gen Accelerator Program entrant
- w/o = Walkover
- r = Retired
- d = Defaulted

=== Draw ===
First round
1 | (Australia) M Edmondson (Australia) K Warwick | 7 | 6
(United States) N Saviano (United States) V Winitsky | 6 | 3
(France) H Leconte (Romania) I Năstase | 7 | 4 | 6
(United States) L Bourne (New Zealand) R Simpson | 6 | 6 | 2
(United States) S McCain (South Africa) B Mitton | 1 | 7 | 6
3 | (United States) J Austin (United States) J Kriek | 6 | 6 | 4
(United States) S Davis (United States) T Mayotte | 6 | 3 | 7
(United States) A Andrews (United States) J Sadri | 3 | 6 | 5
(Australia) J Alexander (Australia) J Fitzgerald | 6 | 6
(Republic of Ireland) M Doyle (South Africa) D Visser | 3 | 4
4 | (United States) S Smith (United States) R Tanner | 6 | 6 | 6
(Egypt) I El Shafei (United Kingdom) J Feaver | 7 | 4 | 4
(United States) M Estep (United States) H Pfister | 6 | 6
(Brazil) M Hocevar (Brazil) J Soares | 3 | 3
(United Kingdom) A Jarrett (United Kingdom) J Smith | 6 | 1
2 | (United States) Ti Gullikson (United States) To Gullikson | 7 | 6

Quarterfinals
1 | (Australia) M Edmondson (Australia) K Warwick | 6 | 3 | 6
(France) H Leconte (Romania) I Năstase | 2 | 6 | 2
(United States) S McCain (South Africa) B Mitton | 6 | 4 | 7
(United States) S Davis (United States) T Mayotte | 4 | 6 | 6
(Australia) J Alexander (Australia) J Fitzgerald | 6 | 6 | 7
4 | (United States) S Smith (United States) R Tanner | 4 | 7 | 6
(United States) M Estep (United States) H Pfister | 5 | 7 | 3
2 | (United States) Ti Gullikson (United States) To Gullikson | 7 | 6 | 6

Semifinals
1 | (Australia) M Edmondson (Australia) K Warwick | 7 | 7
(United States) S McCain (South Africa) B Mitton | 5 | 5
(Australia) J Alexander (Australia) J Fitzgerald | 7 | 6 | 3
2 | (United States) Ti Gullikson (United States) To Gullikson | 6 | 7 | 6

Final
1 | (Australia) M Edmondson (Australia) K Warwick | 4 | 6
2 | (United States) Ti Gullikson (United States) To Gullikson | 6 | 7
