= 1972 Bristol Open =

- Date: 12–17 June
- Edition: 1st
- Category: Grand Prix (C category)
- Draw: 32S / 17D
- Prize money: $17,000
- Surface: Grass / outdoor
- Location: Bristol, England

Champions

Singles
- (South Africa) Bob Hewitt

Doubles
- (South Africa) Bob Hewitt / (South Africa) Frew McMillan
- Bristol Open

The 1972 Bristol Open, also known by its sponsored name W.D. & H.O. Wills Open Tournament, was a men's tennis tournament played on outdoor grass courts. The event was part of the 1972 Commercial Union Assurance Grand Prix circuit and classified as C category. It was played in Bristol, Great Britain and was held from 12 to 17 June 1972. Bob Hewitt won the singles title and earned $7,800 first-prize money.

== Finals ==
=== Singles ===
(South Africa) Bob Hewitt defeated (United States) Alejandro Olmedo 6–4, 6–3

- It was Hewitt's 5th title of the year and the 7th of his career.

=== Doubles ===
(South Africa) Bob Hewitt / (South Africa) Frew McMillan defeated (United States) Clark Graebner / (Australia) Lew Hoad 6–3, 6–2

- It was Hewitt's 4th title of the year and the 6th of his career. It was McMillan's 3rd title of the year and the 5th of his career.
