= 1984 ATP Championship – Doubles =

Doubles
- 1984 ATP Championship

Final
- Champions: (Paraguay) Francisco González (United States) Matt Mitchell
- Runners-up: (United States) Sandy Mayer (Hungary) Balázs Taróczy
- Score: 4–6, 6–3, 7–6

Details
- Draw: 32
- Seeds: 8

Events
Singles	Doubles
- Cincinnati Masters

Victor Amaya and Tim Gullikson were the defending champions but Amaya did not compete this year, having played his last professional tournament one month earlier at Stuttgart before retiring from tennis. Gullikson teamed up with his brother Tom Gullikson and lost in the quarterfinals to Sandy Mayer and Balázs Taróczy.

Francisco González and Matt Mitchell won the title by defeating Mayer and Tarózcy 4–6, 6–3, 7–6 in the final.

== Seeds ==
1. (Australia) Mark Edmondson / (United States) Sherwood Stewart (semifinals)
2. (United States) Steve Denton / (France) Henri Leconte (first round)
3. (United States) Fritz Buehning / (United States) Ferdi Taygan (first round)
4. (United States) Tim Gullikson / (United States) Tom Gullikson (quarterfinals)
5. (United States) Sandy Mayer / (Hungary) Balázs Taróczy (final)
6. (Sweden) Stefan Edberg / (Sweden) Anders Järryd (quarterfinals)
7. (Australia) Michael Fancutt / (United States) Van Winitsky (first round)
8. (Australia) John Alexander / (Australia) John Fitzgerald (first round)

== Draw ==
Key

- Q = Qualifier
- WC = Wild card
- LL = Lucky loser
- Alt = Alternate
- ITF = ITF entry
- PR = Protected ranking
- SR = Special ranking
- SE = Special exempt
- JE = Junior exempt
- JR = Junior Accelerator Programme entrant
- CO = College Accelerator Programme entrant
- NG = Next Gen Accelerator Program entrant
- w/o = Walkover
- r = Retired
- d = Defaulted

=== Finals ===
Semifinals
1	(Australia) Mark Edmondson (United States) Sherwood Stewart	6	6	4
(Paraguay) Francisco González (United States) Matt Mitchell	4	7	6
5	(United States) Sandy Mayer (Hungary) Balázs Taróczy	7	6
(United States) Scott Davis (United States) Ben Testerman	5	1

Final
(Paraguay) Francisco González (United States) Matt Mitchell	4	6	7
5	(United States) Sandy Mayer (Hungary) Balázs Taróczy	6	3	6

=== Top half ===
First round
1	(Australia) M Edmondson (United States) S Stewart	2	6	7
(United States) B Cox (United States) T Moor	6	3	6
(Puerto Rico) E Fernández (Denmark) M Mortensen	7	6	3
(United States) M Davis (United States) C Dunk	6	7	6
(United States) B Gottfried (United States) B Manson	6	6
(United States) T Delatte (United States) M Purcell	2	4
(United States) D Saltz (United States) D Tarr	3	4
6	(Sweden) S Edberg (Sweden) A Järryd	6	6
3	(United States) F Buehning (United States) F Taygan	1	4
(Australia) B Dyke (Australia) W Masur	6	6
(United States) E Fromm (Finland) L Palin	7	4	4
(Australia) C Johnstone (Australia) J McCurdy	6	6	6
(United States) E Sherbeck (United States) E Van't Hof	6	6
(United Kingdom) C Dowdeswell (Australia) CA Miller	3	2
(Paraguay) F González (United States) M Mitchell	6	7
7	(Australia) M Fancutt (United States) V Winitsky	4	5

Second round
1	(Australia) M Edmondson (United States) S Stewart	6	7
(United States) M Davis (United States) C Dunk	3	6
(United States) B Gottfried (United States) B Manson	4	4
6	(Sweden) S Edberg (Sweden) A Järryd	6	6
(Australia) B Dyke (Australia) W Masur	2	6	7
(Australia) C Johnstone (Australia) J McCurdy	6	3	6
(United States) E Sherbeck (United States) E Van't Hof	2	3
(Paraguay) F González (United States) M Mitchell	6	6

Quarterfinals
1	(Australia) M Edmondson (United States) S Stewart	6	6	6
6	(Sweden) S Edberg (Sweden) A Järryd	7	3	3
(Australia) B Dyke (Australia) W Masur	4	5
(Paraguay) F González (United States) M Mitchell	6	7

Semifinals
1	(Australia) M Edmondson (United States) S Stewart	6	6	4
(Paraguay) F González (United States) M Mitchell	4	7	6

=== Bottom half ===
First round
5	(United States) S Mayer (Hungary) B Taróczy	3	6	6
(Sweden) J Nyström (Sweden) M Wilander	6	1	4
(United States) T Stefanki (South Africa) D Visser	1
(Sweden) H Simonsson (Sweden) S Simonsson	0^{r}
(Australia) B Drewett (Australia) K Warwick	7	6
(United Kingdom) J Lloyd (United States) D Stockton	5	4
(United States) S Giammalva Jr. (Switzerland) J Hlasek	3	4
4	(United States) Ti Gullikson (United States) To Gullikson	6	6
8	(Australia) J Alexander (Australia) J Fitzgerald	4	4
(United States) S Davis (United States) B Testerman	6	6
(Australia) D Graham (Australia) L Warder	4	3
(United States) S Meister (Brazil) C Motta	6	6
(New Zealand) M Lewis (New Zealand) D Mustard	6	6
(United States) G Donnelly (United States) J Sadri	3	4
(United States) L Bourne (Israel) S Glickstein	7	6
2	(United States) S Denton (France) H Leconte	6	3

Second round
5	(United States) S Mayer (Hungary) B Taróczy	6	6
(United States) T Stefanki (South Africa) D Visser	2	4
(Australia) B Drewett (Australia) K Warwick	4	4
4	(United States) Ti Gullikson (United States) To Gullikson	6	6
(United States) S Davis (United States) B Testerman	6	7
(United States) S Meister (Brazil) C Motta	2	5
(New Zealand) M Lewis (New Zealand) D Mustard	7	6
(United States) L Bourne (Israel) S Glickstein	6	2

Quarterfinals
5	(United States) S Mayer (Hungary) B Taróczy	6	7
4	(United States) Ti Gullikson (United States) To Gullikson	3	6
(United States) S Davis (United States) B Testerman	6	6
(New Zealand) M Lewis (New Zealand) D Mustard	4	4

Semifinals
5	(United States) S Mayer (Hungary) B Taróczy	7	6
(United States) S Davis (United States) B Testerman	5	1
