= Peter Fleming (tennis) =

American tennis player (born 1955)

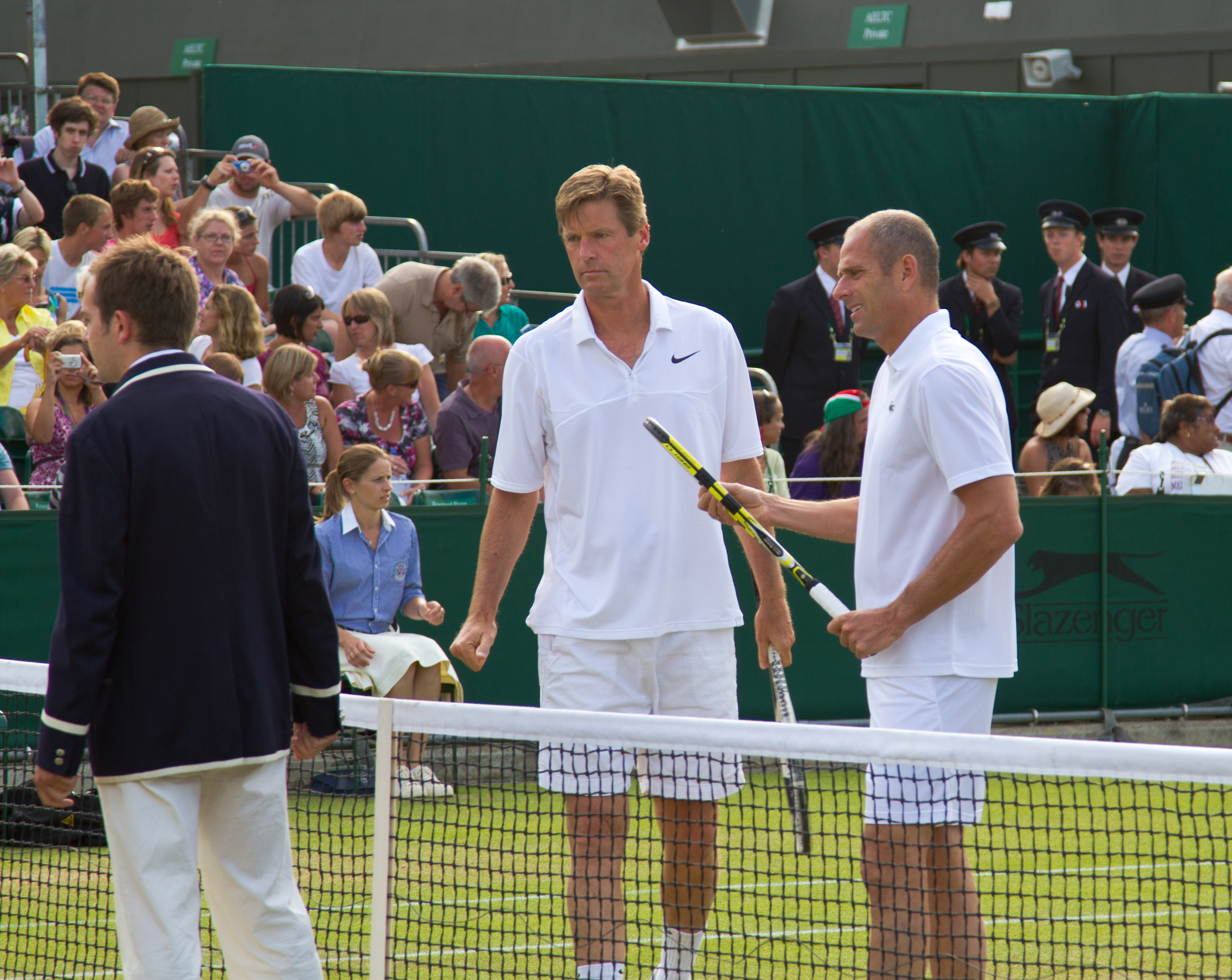
- Fleming and Guy Forget, Wimbledon 2010
- Full name: Peter Blair Fleming
- Country (sports): United States
- Residence: Wimbledon, UK
- Born: January 21, 1955 (age 71) Chatham Borough, New Jersey, US
- Height: 6 ft 5 (1.96 m)
- Turned pro: 1976
- Retired: 1988
- Plays: Right-handed (one-handed backhand)
- Prize money: $1,986,799

Singles
- Career record: 224–213
- Career titles: 3
- Highest ranking: No. 8 (July 7, 1980)

Grand Slam singles results
- Australian Open: 3R (1983)
- French Open: 2R (1977, 1980)
- Wimbledon: QF (1980)
- US Open: 3R (1978)

Doubles
- Career record: 520–177
- Career titles: 65
- Highest ranking: No. 1 (June 11, 1984)

Grand Slam doubles results
- Australian Open: 3R (1983)
- French Open: SF (1987)
- Wimbledon: W (1979, 1981, 1983, 1984)
- US Open: W (1979, 1981, 1983)

Other doubles tournaments
- Tour Finals: W (1978, 1979, 1980, 1981, 1982, 1983, 1984)

Mixed doubles
- Career record: 6–5
- Career titles: 0

Grand Slam mixed doubles results
- Wimbledon: 3R (1987)
- US Open: F (1986)

Peter Blair Fleming (born January 21, 1955) is an American former professional tennis player. In his doubles partnership with John McEnroe, he won 52 titles, of which seven were at Grand Slams (four at Wimbledon, three at the US Open). As a singles player, he peaked at world No. 8, winning three titles (including the 1979 Cincinnati Open).

== Tennis career ==
Fleming attended Chatham High School, where he won the New Jersey high school individual championship in 1972, during his junior year. He won the men's singles in the Ojai Tennis Tournament in 1975.

During the 1980s, Fleming teamed up with fellow American John McEnroe to dominate the men's doubles game. The duo won 52 doubles titles together, including four at Wimbledon (1979, 1981, 1983 and 1984), and three at the US Open (1979, 1981 and 1983). Fleming once said that "The best doubles pair in the world is John McEnroe and anyone".

Fleming also played on three American Davis Cup winning teams (1979, 1981 and 1982), and helped the US win the World Team Cup twice (1984 and 1985). Fleming reached the World No. 1 doubles ranking in 1984. His career-high singles ranking was world No. 8 in 1980, the year in which he reached the quarter-finals at the Wimbledon championships. Over the course of his career Fleming won three top-level singles titles and sixty doubles titles. Prior to turning professional, Fleming played tennis for the University of California, Los Angeles (after transferring from the University of Michigan), and won the National Collegiate Athletic Association doubles title in 1976.

Since retiring as a player, Fleming has become a tennis commentator for Sky Sports, Eurosport and the BBC.

Fleming is a keen golfer (handicap 10) and is an active member of The Stage Golf Society.

He was inducted into the Intercollegiate Tennis Association (ITA) Hall of Fame. On July 30, 2011, Fleming, the Farmers Classic 1979 singles and 1983 doubles champion, was named 2011 Farmers Classic Tournament Honoree.

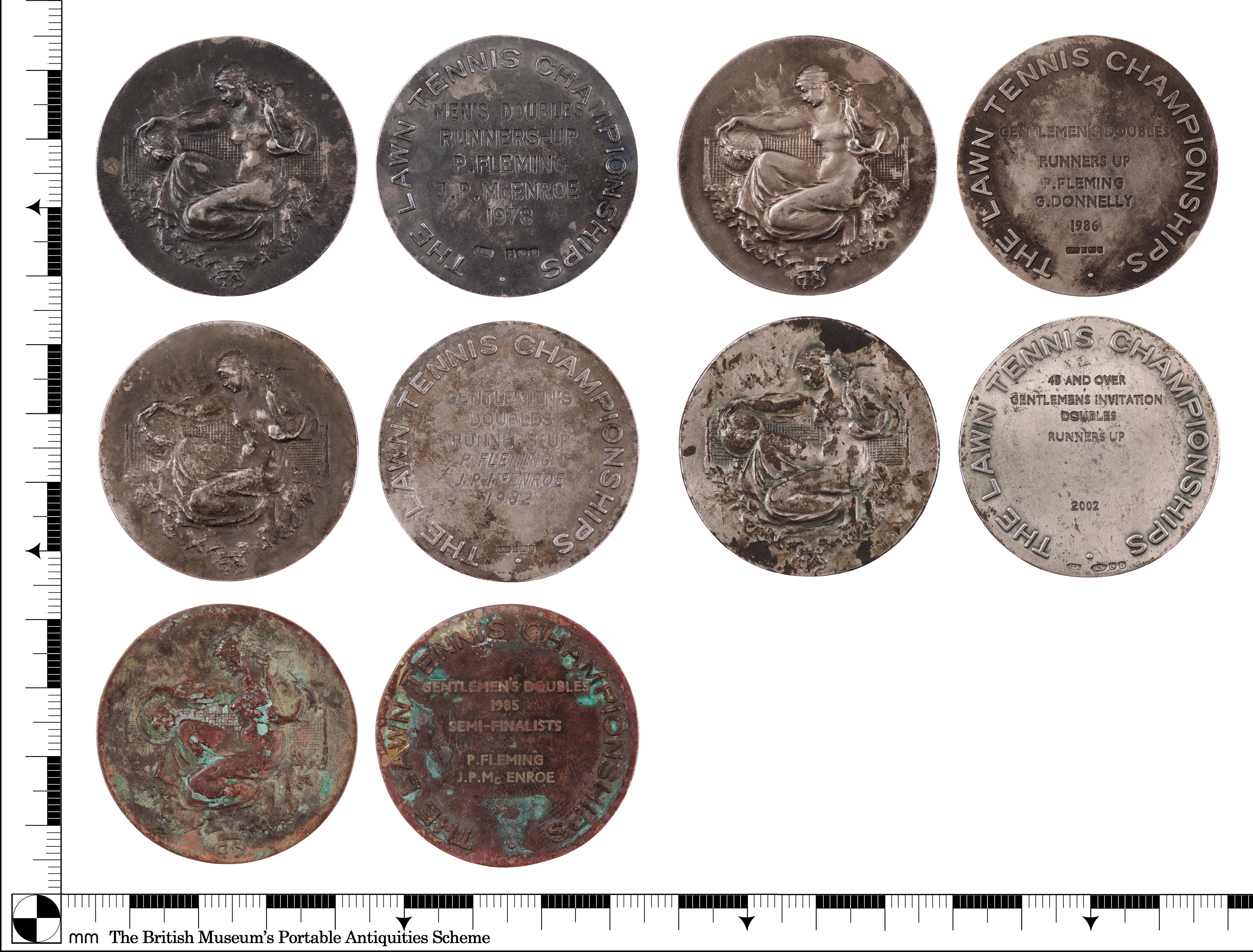
Fleming's Wimbledon medals, as recorded by the Portable Antiquities Scheme

In 2020 five of Fleming's Wimbledon Lawn Tennis Championships Medals, dating from 1978 to 2002, were found in London and reported to the Portable Antiquities Scheme.

== Career finals ==
=== Singles: 8 (3 wins / 5 losses) ===
Result	W-L	Date	Tournament	Surface	Opponent	Score
Loss	0–1	Oct 1978	Maui, US	Hard	(United States) Bill Scanlon	2–6, 0–6
Win	1–1	Nov 1978	Bologna, Italy	Carpet	(Italy) Adriano Panatta	6–2, 7–6
Loss	1–2	Dec 1978	Montego Bay, Jamaica	Hard	(Romania) Ilie Năstase	6–2, 6–5, 2–6, 4–6, 4–6
Loss	1–3	Apr 1979	San Jose, US	Carpet	(United States) John McEnroe	6–7, 6–7
Win	2–3	Aug 1979	Cincinnati, US	Hard	(United States) Roscoe Tanner	6–4, 6–2
Win	3–3	Sep 1979	Los Angeles, US	Carpet	(United States) John McEnroe	6–4, 6–4
Loss	3–4	Sep 1979	San Francisco, US	Carpet	(United States) John McEnroe	6–4, 5–7, 2–6
Loss	3–5	Oct 1979	Maui, US	Hard	(United States) Bill Scanlon	1–6, 1–6

=== Doubles: 86 (65 wins / 21 losses) ===
Result	W-L	Date	Tournament	Surface	Partner	Opponents	Score
Loss	0–1	Mar 1976	La Costa, US	Hard	(United States) Gene Mayer	(United States) Marty Riessen (United States) Roscoe Tanner	6–7, 6–7
Loss	0–2	Aug 1977	Columbus, US	Clay	(United States) Gene Mayer	(United States) Robert Lutz (United States) Stan Smith	6–4, 5–7, 2–6
Loss	0–3	Sep 1977	Laguna Niguel, US	Hard	(United States) Trey Waltke	(United States) James Chico Hagey (United States) Billy Martin	3–6, 4–6
Loss	0–4	Dec 1977	Johannesburg, South Africa	Hard	(South Africa) Raymond Moore	(United States) Marty Riessen (United States) Roscoe Tanner	6–7, 6–7
Win	1–4	Apr 1978	Monte Carlo, Monaco	Clay	(Czechoslovakia) Tomáš Šmíd	(Chile) Jaime Fillol (Romania) Ilie Năstase	6–4, 7–5
Loss	1–5	Jul 1978	Wimbledon, London	Grass	(United States) John McEnroe	(South Africa) Bob Hewitt (South Africa) Frew McMillan	1–6, 4–6, 2–6
Win	2–5	Aug 1978	South Orange, US	Clay	(United States) John McEnroe	(Romania) Ion Țiriac (Argentina) Guillermo Vilas	6–3, 6–3
Win	3–5	Oct 1978	San Francisco, US	Carpet	(United States) John McEnroe	(United States) Robert Lutz (United States) Stan Smith	5–7, 6–4, 6–4
Loss	3–6	Oct 1978	Maui, US	Hard	(United States) John McEnroe	(United States) Tim Gullikson (United States) Tom Gullikson	6–7, 6–7
Win	4–6	Nov 1978	Cologne, Germany	Hard (i)	(United States) John McEnroe	(South Africa) Bob Hewitt (South Africa) Frew McMillan	6–3, 6–2
Win	5–6	Nov 1978	Bologna, Italy	Carpet	(United States) John McEnroe	(France) Jean-Louis Haillet (Italy) Antonio Zugarelli	6–1, 6–4
Win	6–6	Dec 1978	Johannesburg, South Africa	Hard	(South Africa) Raymond Moore	(South Africa) Bob Hewitt (South Africa) Frew McMillan	6–3, 7–6
Win	7–6	Jan 1979	World Doubles WCT, London	Carpet	(United States) John McEnroe	(Romania) Ilie Năstase (United States) Sherwood Stewart	3–6, 6–2, 6–3, 6–1
Win	8–6	Jan 1979	Masters, New York City	Carpet	(United States) John McEnroe	(Poland) Wojciech Fibak (Netherlands) Tom Okker	6–4, 6–2, 6–4
Loss	8–7	Jan 1979	Philadelphia, US	Carpet	(United States) John McEnroe	(Poland) Wojciech Fibak (Netherlands) Tom Okker	7–5, 1–6, 3–6
Win	9–7	Mar 1979	New Orleans, US	Carpet	(United States) John McEnroe	(United States) Robert Lutz (United States) Stan Smith	6–1, 6–3
Win	10–7	Apr 1979	Milan, Italy	Carpet	(United States) John McEnroe	(Argentina) José Luis Clerc (Czechoslovakia) Tomáš Šmíd	6–1, 6–3
Win	11–7	Apr 1979	Rotterdam, Netherlands	Carpet	(United States) John McEnroe	(Switzerland) Heinz Günthardt (South Africa) Bernard Mitton	6–4, 6–4
Win	12–7	Apr 1979	San Jose, US	Carpet	(United States) John McEnroe	(United States) Hank Pfister (United States) Brad Rowe	6–3, 6–4
Win	13–7	May 1979	Rome, Italy	Carpet	(Czechoslovakia) Tomáš Šmíd	(Argentina) José Luis Clerc (Romania) Ilie Năstase	4–6, 6–1, 7–5
Win	14–7	Jul 1979	Wimbledon, London	Grass	(United States) John McEnroe	(United States) Brian Gottfried (Mexico) Raúl Ramírez	4–6, 6–4, 6–2, 6–2
Win	15–7	Jul 1979	Forest Hills WCT, US	Clay	(United States) John McEnroe	(United States) Gene Mayer (United States) Sandy Mayer	6–7, 7–6, 6–3
Win	16–7	Aug 1979	South Orange, US	Clay	(United States) John McEnroe	(United States) Fritz Buehning (United States) Bruce Nichols	6–1, 6–3
Win	17–7	Aug 1979	Toronto, Canada	Hard	(United States) John McEnroe	(Switzerland) Heinz Günthardt (South Africa) Bob Hewitt	6–7, 7–6, 6–1
Win	18–7	Sep 1979	US Open, New York City	Hard	(United States) John McEnroe	(United States) Robert Lutz (United States) Stan Smith	6–2, 6–4
Win	19–7	Sep 1979	San Francisco, US	Carpet	(United States) John McEnroe	(Poland) Wojciech Fibak (South Africa) Frew McMillan	6–1, 6–4
Win	20–7	Nov 1979	Stockholm, Sweden	Hard (i)	(United States) John McEnroe	(Poland) Wojciech Fibak (Netherlands) Tom Okker	6–4, 6–4
Win	21–7	Nov 1979	Wembley, UK	Carpet	(United States) John McEnroe	(Czechoslovakia) Tomáš Šmíd (United States) Stan Smith	6–2, 6–3
Win	22–7	Nov 1979	Bologna, Italy	Carpet	(United States) John McEnroe	(United States) Fritz Buehning (United States) Ferdi Taygan	6–1, 6–1
Win	23–7	Jan 1980	Masters, New York City	Carpet	(United States) John McEnroe	(Poland) Wojciech Fibak (Netherlands) Tom Okker	6–3, 7–6, 6–1
Win	24–7	Jan 1980	Philadelphia, US	Carpet	(United States) John McEnroe	(United States) Brian Gottfried (Mexico) Raúl Ramírez	6–3, 7–6
Win	25–7	Mar 1980	Milan, Italy	Carpet	(United States) John McEnroe	(Rhodesia) Andrew Pattison (United States) Butch Walts	6–2, 6–7, 6–2
Win	26–7	May 1980	Forest Hills WCT, US	Clay	(United States) John McEnroe	(Australia) Peter McNamara (Australia) Paul McNamee	6–2, 5–7, 6–2
Loss	26–8	Aug 1980	Columbus, US	Hard	(United States) Eliot Teltscher	(United States) Brian Gottfried (United States) Sandy Mayer	4–6, 2–6
Loss	26–9	Sep 1980	US Open, New York City	Hard	(United States) John McEnroe	(United States) Robert Lutz (United States) Stan Smith	6–7, 6–3, 1–6, 6–3, 3–6
Win	27–9	Sep 1980	San Francisco, US	Carpet	(United States) John McEnroe	(United States) Gene Mayer (United States) Sandy Mayer	6–1, 6–4
Win	28–9	Oct 1980	Maui, US	Hard	(United States) John McEnroe	(United States) Victor Amaya (United States) Hank Pfister	7–6, 6–7, 6–2
Win	29–9	Oct 1980	Sydney Indoor, Australia	Hard (i)	(United States) John McEnroe	(United States) Tim Gullikson (South Africa) Johan Kriek	4–6, 6–1, 6–2
Win	30–9	Nov 1980	Hong Kong	Hard	(United States) Ferdi Taygan	(United States) Bruce Manson (United States) Brian Teacher	7–5, 6–2
Win	31–9	Nov 1980	Wembley, UK	Carpet	(United States) John McEnroe	(United States) Bill Scanlon (United States) Eliot Teltscher	7–5, 6–3
Win	32–9	Jan 1981	Masters, New York City	Carpet	(United States) John McEnroe	(Australia) Peter McNamara (Australia) Paul McNamee	6–4, 6–3
Win	33–9	Apr 1981	Las Vegas, US	Hard	(United States) John McEnroe	(United States) Tracy Delatte (United States) Trey Waltke	6–3, 7–6
Win	34–9	May 1981	Forest Hills WCT, US	Clay	(United States) John McEnroe	(Australia) John Fitzgerald (United States) Andy Kohlberg	6–4, 6–4
Win	35–9	Jul 1981	Wimbledon, London	Grass	(United States) John McEnroe	(United States) Robert Lutz (United States) Stan Smith	6–4, 6–4, 6–4
Loss	35–10	Aug 1981	Montreal, Canada	Hard	(United States) John McEnroe	(Mexico) Raúl Ramírez (United States) Ferdi Taygan	6–2, 6–7, 4–6
Win	36–10	Aug 1981	Atlanta, US	Hard	(United States) Fritz Buehning	(United States) Sammy Giammalva Jr. (United States) Tony Giammalva	6–4, 4–6, 6–3
Win	37–10	Sep 1981	US Open, New York City	Hard	(United States) John McEnroe	(Switzerland) Heinz Günthardt (Australia) Peter McNamara	DEF
Win	38–10	Sep 1981	San Francisco, US	Carpet	(United States) John McEnroe	(Australia) Mark Edmondson (United States) Sherwood Stewart	7–6, 6–4
Win	39–10	Oct 1981	Sydney Indoor, Australia	Hard (i)	(United States) John McEnroe	(United States) Sherwood Stewart (United States) Ferdi Taygan	6–7, 7–6, 6–1
Loss	39–11	Nov 1981	Wembley, UK	Carpet	(United States) John McEnroe	(United States) Sherwood Stewart (United States) Ferdi Taygan	5–7, 7–6, 4–6
Win	40–11	Jan 1982	Masters, New York City	Carpet	(United States) John McEnroe	(South Africa) Kevin Curren (United States) Steve Denton	6–3, 6–3
Win	41–11	Jan 1982	Philadelphia, US	Carpet	(United States) John McEnroe	(United States) Sherwood Stewart (United States) Ferdi Taygan	7–6, 6–4
Loss	41–12	Feb 1982	Memphis, US	Carpet	(United States) John McEnroe	(South Africa) Kevin Curren (United States) Steve Denton	6–7, 6–4, 2–6
Loss	41–13	Jul 1982	Wimbledon, London	Grass	(United States) John McEnroe	(Australia) Paul McNamee (Australia) Peter McNamara	3–6, 2–6
Loss	41–14	Aug 1982	Toronto, Canada	Hard	(United States) John McEnroe	(United States) Steve Denton (Australia) Mark Edmondson	7–6, 5–7, 2–6
Win	42–14	Aug 1982	Cincinnati, US	Hard	(United States) John McEnroe	(United States) Steve Denton (Australia) Mark Edmondson	6–2, 6–3
Win	43–14	Nov 1982	Wembley, UK	Carpet	(United States) John McEnroe	(Switzerland) Heinz Günthardt (Czechoslovakia) Tomáš Šmíd	7–6, 6–4
Win	44–14	Jan 1983	Masters, New York City	Carpet	(United States) John McEnroe	(United States) Sherwood Stewart (United States) Ferdi Taygan	7–5, 6–3
Loss	44–15	Feb 1983	Philadelphia, US	Carpet	(United States) John McEnroe	(South Africa) Kevin Curren (United States) Steve Denton	4–6, 6–7
Loss	44–16	Mar 1983	Rotterdam, Netherlands	Hard (i)	(Czechoslovakia) Pavel Složil	(United States) Fritz Buehning (United States) Tom Gullikson	6–7, 6–4, 6–7
Loss	44–17	Mar 1983	Milan, Italy	Carpet	(United States) Fritz Buehning	(Czechoslovakia) Pavel Složil (Czechoslovakia) Tomáš Šmíd	2–6, 7–5, 4–6
Win	45–17	Apr 1983	Los Angeles, US	Hard	(United States) John McEnroe	(United States) Sandy Mayer (United States) Ferdi Taygan	6–1, 6–2
Win	46–17	Jul 1983	Wimbledon, London	Grass	(United States) John McEnroe	(United States) Tim Gullikson (United States) Tom Gullikson	6–4, 6–3, 6–4
Win	47–17	Sep 1983	US Open, New York City	Hard	(United States) John McEnroe	(United States) Fritz Buehning (United States) Van Winitsky	6–3, 6–4, 6–2
Win	48–17	Sep 1983	San Francisco, US	Carpet	(United States) John McEnroe	(Czechoslovakia) Ivan Lendl (United States) Vincent Van Patten	6–1, 6–2
Loss	48–18	Nov 1983	Stockholm, Sweden	Hard (i)	(United States) Johan Kriek	(Sweden) Anders Järryd (Sweden) Hans Simonsson	3–6, 4–6
Win	49–18	Nov 1983	Wembley, UK	Carpet	(United States) John McEnroe	(United States) Steve Denton (United States) Sherwood Stewart	6–3, 6–4
Win	50–18	Jan 1984	Masters, New York City	Carpet	(United States) John McEnroe	(Czechoslovakia) Pavel Složil (Czechoslovakia) Tomáš Šmíd	6–2, 6–2
Win	51–18	Jan 1984	Philadelphia, US	Carpet	(United States) John McEnroe	(France) Henri Leconte (France) Yannick Noah	6–2, 6–3
Win	52–18	Feb 1984	Memphis, US	Carpet	(United States) Fritz Buehning	(Switzerland) Heinz Günthardt (Czechoslovakia) Tomáš Šmíd	6–3, 6–0
Win	53–18	Mar 1984	Madrid, Spain	Carpet	(United States) John McEnroe	(United States) Fritz Buehning (United States) Ferdi Taygan	6–3, 6–3
Win	54–18	Jul 1984	Wimbledon, London	Grass	(United States) John McEnroe	(Australia) Pat Cash (Australia) Paul McNamee	6–2, 5–7, 6–2, 3–6, 6–3
Win	55–18	Aug 1984	Toronto, Canada	Hard	(United States) John McEnroe	(Australia) John Fitzgerald (Australia) Kim Warwick	6–4, 6–2
Win	56–18	Sep 1984	San Francisco, US	Carpet	(United States) John McEnroe	(United States) Mike De Palmer (United States) Sammy Giammalva Jr.	6–3, 6–4
Win	57–18	Jan 1985	Masters, New York City	Carpet	(United States) John McEnroe	(Australia) Mark Edmondson (United States) Sherwood Stewart	6–3, 6–1
Win	58–18	Feb 1985	Toronto Indoor, Canada	Carpet	(Sweden) Anders Järryd	(United States) Glenn Layendecker (Canada) Glenn Michibata	7–6, 6–2
Win	59–18	Mar 1985	Houston, US	Carpet	(United States) John McEnroe	(United States) Hank Pfister (United States) Ben Testerman	6–3, 6–2
Win	60–18	Mar 1986	La Quinta, US	Carpet	(France) Guy Forget	(France) Yannick Noah (United States) Sherwood Stewart	6–4, 6–3
Loss	60–19	Jul 1986	Wimbledon, London	Grass	(United States) Gary Donnelly	(Sweden) Joakim Nyström (Sweden) Mats Wilander	6–7, 3–6, 3–6
Win	61–19	Aug 1986	Stratton Mountain, US	Hard	(United States) John McEnroe	(United States) Paul Annacone (South Africa) Christo van Rensburg	6–3, 3–6, 6–3
Loss	61–20	Sep 1986	Los Angeles, US	Hard	(United States) John McEnroe	(Sweden) Stefan Edberg (Sweden) Anders Järryd	6–3, 5–7, 6–7
Win	62–20	Sep 1986	San Francisco, US	Carpet	(United States) John McEnroe	(United States) Mike De Palmer (United States) Gary Donnelly	6–4, 7–6
Win	63–20	Nov 1986	Paris Indoor, France	Carpet	(United States) John McEnroe	(Iran) Mansour Bahrami (Uruguay) Diego Pérez	6–3, 6–2
Win	64–20	Nov 1986	Wembley, UK	Carpet	(United States) John McEnroe	(United States) Sherwood Stewart (Australia) Kim Warwick	3–6, 7–6, 6–2
Loss	64–21	May 1987	Forest Hills, US	Clay	(United States) Gary Donnelly	(France) Guy Forget (France) Yannick Noah	6–4, 4–6, 1–6
Win	65–21	Aug 1987	Washington, D.C., US	Hard	(United States) Gary Donnelly	(Australia) Laurie Warder (United States) Blaine Willenborg	6–2, 7–6

== ATP doubles records ==
Tournament	Years	Record accomplished	Players matched
Grand Prix Tour Finals	1978–84	7 Titles	John McEnroe
Grand Prix Tour Finals	1978–84	7 consecutive titles	John McEnroe
Grand Prix Tour	1979	14 doubles titles in 1 season	John McEnroe
