= Ben Testerman =

American tennis player (born 1962)

- Country (sports): United States
- Residence: Knoxville, Tennessee, United States
- Born: February 2, 1962 (age 64) Knoxville, Tennessee, United States
- Height: 6 ft 1 in (1.85 m)
- Turned pro: 1979
- Retired: 1987
- Plays: Left-handed (one-handed backhand)
- Prize money: $371,244

Singles
- Career record: 87–102
- Career titles: 0; 0 Challenger, 0 Futures
- Highest ranking: No. 22 (10 December 1984)

Grand Slam singles results
- Australian Open: SF (1984)
- French Open: 3R (1981)
- Wimbledon: 3R (1985)
- US Open: 1R (1982, 1984, 1985, 1986, 1987)

Doubles
- Career record: 72–82
- Career titles: 1; 0 Challenger, 0 Futures
- Highest ranking: No. 33 (25 March 1985)

Grand Slam doubles results
- Australian Open: 2R (1982, 1984, 1985)
- French Open: 1R (1981, 1983)
- Wimbledon: 2R (1985, 1987)
- US Open: QF (1984)

Grand Slam mixed doubles results
- Wimbledon: 2R (1986)
- US Open: QF (1986)
- Last updated on: 26 August 2022.

Ben Testerman (born February 2, 1962) is a former professional tennis player from the United States.

During his career, he won one doubles title. He achieved a career-high singles ranking of World No. 22 in 1984 and a career-high doubles ranking of World No. 33 in 1985. His best achievement in singles competition was reaching the semifinals of the 1984 Australian Open, losing to Kevin Curren in five sets. He was inducted into the Tennessee Tennis Hall of Fame in 2008.

His father was a two-time mayor of Knoxville, Tennessee, Kyle Testerman.

== ATP career finals ==
=== Singles: 1 (1 runner-up) ===
| Legend Grand Slam Tournaments (0–0) ATP World Tour Finals (0–0) ATP Masters 1000 Series (0–0) ATP 500 Series (0–0) ATP 250 Series (0–1) | Finals by surface Hard (0–0) Clay (0–0) Grass (0–0) Carpet (0–1) | Finals by setting Outdoors (0–0) Indoors (0–1) |

| Result | W–L | Date | Tournament | Tier | Surface | Opponent | Score |
|---|---|---|---|---|---|---|---|
| Loss | 0–1 | Mar 1983 | Monterrey, Mexico | Grand Prix | Carpet | (United States) Sammy Giammalva Jr. | 4–6, 6–3, 3–6 |

=== Doubles: 4 (1 title, 3 runner-ups) ===
| Legend Grand Slam Tournaments (0–0) ATP World Tour Finals (0–0) ATP Masters 1000 Series (0–0) ATP 500 Series (0–0) ATP 250 Series (1–3) | Finals by surface Hard (1–1) Clay (0–0) Grass (0–0) Carpet (0–2) | Finals by setting Outdoors (1–1) Indoors (0–2) |

| Result | W–L | Date | Tournament | Tier | Surface | Partner | Opponents | Score |
|---|---|---|---|---|---|---|---|---|
| Win | 1–0 | Aug 1984 | Livingston, United States | Grand Prix | Hard | (United States) Scott Davis | (United States) Paul Annacone (Canada) Glenn Michibata | 6–4, 6–4 |
| Loss | 1–1 | Mar 1985 | Houston, United States | Grand Prix | Carpet | (United States) Hank Pfister | (United States) Peter Fleming (United States) John McEnroe | 3–6, 2–6 |
| Loss | 1–2 | Aug 1985 | Cleveland, United States | Grand Prix | Hard | (United States) Hank Pfister | (Finland) Leo Palin (Finland) Olli Rahnasto | 3–6, 7–6, 6–7 |
| Loss | 1–3 | Oct 1985 | Brisbane, Australia | Grand Prix | Carpet | (United States) Bud Schultz | (United States) Martin Davis (Australia) Brad Drewett | 2–6, 2–6 |

== Junior Grand Slam finals ==
=== Singles: 1 (1 runner-up) ===
| Result | Year | Championship | Surface | Opponent | Score |
|---|---|---|---|---|---|
| Loss | 1979 | French Open | Clay | (India) Ramesh Krishnan | 6–2, 1–6, 0–6 |

== Performance timelines ==
Key
| W | F | SF | QF | #R | RR | Q# | DNQ | A | NH |

(W) winner; (F) finalist; (SF) semifinalist; (QF) quarterfinalist; (#R) rounds 4, 3, 2, 1; (RR) round-robin stage; (Q#) qualification round; (DNQ) did not qualify; (A) absent; (NH) not held; (SR) strike rate (events won / competed); (W–L) win–loss record.

=== Singles ===
| Tournament | 1981 | 1982 | 1983 | 1984 | 1985 | 1986 | 1987 | SR | W–L | Win % |
|---|---|---|---|---|---|---|---|---|---|---|
Grand Slam tournaments
| Australian Open | A | 3R | 2R | SF | 3R | A | 3R | 0 / 5 | 9–5 | 64% |
| French Open | 3R | A | 1R | 2R | A | A | A | 0 / 3 | 3–3 | 50% |
| Wimbledon | A | A | 1R | 2R | 3R | 1R | 1R | 0 / 5 | 3–5 | 38% |
| US Open | A | 1R | A | 1R | 1R | 1R | 1R | 0 / 5 | 0–5 | 0% |
| Win–loss | 2–1 | 2–2 | 0–3 | 6–4 | 4–3 | 0–2 | 1–3 | 0 / 18 | 15–18 | 45% |
ATP Masters Series
| Miami | A | A | A | A | A | A | 1R | 0 / 1 | 0–1 | 0% |
| Hamburg | A | A | 1R | A | A | A | A | 0 / 1 | 0–1 | 0% |
| Rome | A | A | 1R | A | A | A | A | 0 / 1 | 0–1 | 0% |
| Canada | A | 2R | A | A | A | A | A | 0 / 1 | 1–1 | 50% |
| Cincinnati | A | 1R | A | 2R | 1R | A | 2R | 0 / 4 | 2–4 | 33% |
| Win–loss | 0–0 | 1–2 | 0–2 | 1–1 | 0–1 | 0–0 | 1–2 | 0 / 8 | 3–8 | 27% |

=== Doubles ===
| Tournament | 1979 | 1980 | 1981 | 1982 | 1983 | 1984 | 1985 | 1986 | 1987 | SR | W–L | Win % |
|---|---|---|---|---|---|---|---|---|---|---|---|---|
Grand Slam tournaments
| Australian Open | A | A | A | 2R | 1R | 2R | 2R | A | 1R | 0 / 5 | 1–5 | 17% |
| French Open | A | A | 1R | A | 1R | A | A | A | A | 0 / 2 | 0–2 | 0% |
| Wimbledon | A | A | A | A | 1R | A | 2R | 1R | 2R | 0 / 4 | 2–4 | 33% |
| US Open | 1R | 3R | A | A | A | QF | 1R | 2R | 2R | 0 / 6 | 7–6 | 54% |
| Win–loss | 0–1 | 2–1 | 0–1 | 0–1 | 0–3 | 3–2 | 2–3 | 1–2 | 2–3 | 0 / 17 | 10–17 | 37% |
ATP Masters Series
| Miami | A | A | A | A | A | A | A | A | 1R | 0 / 1 | 0–1 | 0% |
| Hamburg | A | A | A | A | 2R | A | A | A | A | 0 / 1 | 1–1 | 50% |
| Rome | A | A | A | A | 1R | A | A | A | A | 0 / 1 | 0–1 | 0% |
| Cincinnati | A | A | A | A | A | SF | 1R | A | 1R | 0 / 3 | 3–3 | 50% |
| Paris | A | A | A | A | A | A | A | 2R | A | 0 / 1 | 1–1 | 50% |
| Win–loss | 0–0 | 0–0 | 0–0 | 0–0 | 1–2 | 3–1 | 0–1 | 1–1 | 0–2 | 0 / 7 | 5–7 | 42% |
