= WCT Houston Shootout =

Defunct tennis tournament
- Tour: ITF Grand Prix Circuit
- Founded: 1985; 41 years ago
- Abolished: 1986; 40 years ago
- Editions: 2
- Location: Houston, Texas, United States
- Surface: Carpet / indoor

The WCT Houston Shootout was a men's World Championship Tennis (WCT) affiliated tennis tournament played on indoor carpet courts in Houston, Texas, United States from 1985 to 1986. It was part of the Grand Prix circuit, as the two organisations merged tours in 1985. The tournament was founded by the WCT in response to the end of their 13-year partnership with the River Oaks International Tennis Tournament in Houston.

== History ==
The WCT Houston Shoot Out was a men's hard court tennis tournament founded in 1985, that ran for two editions. The 1985 edition was held late February to early March that season. The final edition in 1986 was played during the middle two weeks of November that year.

== Finals ==
=== Singles ===
Year	Champions	Runners-up	Score
1985	(United States) John McEnroe	(South Africa) Kevin Curren	7–5, 6–1, 7–6^{(7–4)}
1986	(Socialist Federal Republic of Yugoslavia) Slobodan Živojinović	(United States) Scott Davis	6–1, 4–6, 6–3
