= Johan Kriek =

South African-American tennis player

- Country (sports): South Africa; United States (1982–)
- Residence: Palm Beach Gardens, Florida, US
- Born: April 5, 1958 (age 68) Pongola, South Africa
- Height: 1.75 m (5 ft 9 in)
- Turned pro: 1978
- Retired: 1994
- Plays: Right-handed (one-handed backhand)
- Prize money: $2,383,794

Singles
- Career record: 376–222 (62.9%)
- Career titles: 14
- Highest ranking: No. 7 (September 10, 1984)

Grand Slam singles results
- Australian Open: W (1981, 1982)
- French Open: SF (1986)
- Wimbledon: QF (1981, 1982)
- US Open: SF (1980)

Other tournaments
- Tour Finals: QF (1982, 1983, 1984, 1985)
- WCT Finals: F (1981)

Doubles
- Career record: 206–173 (54.4%)
- Career titles: 8
- Highest ranking: No. 12 (August 15, 1988)

Johan Christiaan Kriek (born April 5, 1958) is a South African–American former professional tennis player. He won two Australian Open titles, defeating Steve Denton in four sets in the 1981 final and the same opponent in the 1982 final in straight sets, when he tamed Denton's powerful serve and "relentlessly whipped winners past him from all angles of the court".

Kriek reached the semifinals at the French Open and US Open, as well as the quarterfinals of the Wimbledon Championships. He won 14 professional singles and eight doubles titles, reaching a career-high singles ranking of world No. 7 in September 1984.

== Career ==
Johan Kriek turned professional in 1978 at the age of 20. Kriek made his first Grand Slam appearance at Wimbledon’s in 1978, reaching the second round. In the 1978 US Open, Kriek advanced to the quarterfinals. The following year, in 1979, he reached the quarter-finals at the US Open for the second consecutive year, losing to American Vitas Gerulaitis.

1980 saw Kriek make the semi-finals of the US Open. Going into the tournament unseeded, he was defeated by Bjorn Borg in the semi-final despite winning the first two sets. By the end of 1980, Kriek had risen to No.18 in the singles rankings, marking the first time he had entered the top 20. This marked the first of six consecutive years of Kriek being inside the top 20.

Going into the 1981 Australian Open Kriek was seeded fourth. He won his first two matches in straight sets, before defeating Chris Lewis in five sets in the third round. He defeated Tim Mayotte in the quarter final in straight sets and defeated former champion Mark Edmondson in the semi-final to set up a final with the American Steve Denton. Kriek won the final in four sets. In doing so, Kriek became the first African and South African to win a Grand Slam tournament. Kriek reached the quarter-finals of Wimbledon in 1981.

1982 also saw Kriek defeat John McEnroe in the Memphis Open. He won the La Costa WCT, defeating Roscoe Tanner in the final. 1982 saw Kriek record his highest end of year ranking, reaching No.12. He again reached the quarter-finals at Wimbledon, losing to John McEnroe in four sets. Kriek went into the Australian Open of 1982 as defending Champion and top seed. He reached the quarter-finals of the competition after dropping only one set. He defeated American Drew Gitlin to advance through the semi-finals. After beating Paul McNamee in the semis, he once again defeated Steve Denton in the final, to make it back to back Australian Open titles. He qualified for the Volvo Masters for the first time, defeating Denton in the first round, before being eliminated by Jimmy Connors in the second round of the competition.

Kriek continued to enjoy success at grass tournaments, winning the Bristol Open in 1983, and reaching the final of the doubles tournament. He also won the Johannesburg Open in the country of his birth, defeating British player Colin Dowdeswell in the final. In the 1983 Volvo Masters he reached the quarter-finals stage, losing to eventual winner John McEnroe.

He reached the semi-final stage of the 1984 Australian Open but was unable to add to his previous successes, losing to eventual winner Mats Wilander. Kriek did however record his second success at Bristol. In September 1984 he reached his highest ever position in the ranking at No.7. He reached the quarter-finals of the end of years Masters, losing to Mats Wilander.

Kriek partnered fellow Grand Slam winner Yannick Noah in the 1985 Chicago doubles and the pair won the tournament. Kriek lost in the 1985 final of Queens to Boris Becker. Kriek was unable to reach the latter stages of that year’s Wimbledon, losing in the fourth round to Paul Annacone. He again competed in the end of year Masters Tournament, managing a victory over Stefan Edberg in the first round of the competition, but was once again unable to progress past the quarter-finals. Kriek recorded his best finish in the French Open in 1986. He defeated Guillermo Vilas in the quarter-final, before suffering a straight sets defeat to Ivan Lendl in the semi-final.

Kriek's final singles title came at the Livingston Open in the US, where he defeated German Christian Saceanu in the final in 1987. Following persistent injuries, Kriek had dropped down to no. 52 by 1989. While Kriek did not win another singles title, he reached his career high ranking of No. 12 in doubles in 1988. He enjoyed success at two more doubles events, winning the Philadelphia Open and the Tokyo Open at the start of 1989. The final three single finals he reached all ended in defeat, the last of which was the 1989 Memphis final. Kriek made his final appearance at a Grand Slam at Wimbledon in 1991, where he was eliminated in the first round.

Kriek retired having won 14 singles titles, including two Grand Slams. He also won 8 doubles titles.

== Post tennis ==
After retiring from tennis, Kriek transitioned into coaching, setting up the Johan Kriek Tennis Academy. He has also worked on several philanthropic projects including helping to supply citizens of developing nations with clean drinking water.

== Style of play ==
Due to his stature, Kriek relied on speed rather than physical strength. He was known for being able to retrieve difficult shots which would often results in long rallies. Kriek grew up on the hard courts of South Africa, but he was perhaps most effective on grass, being an effective serve and volleyer which made him a dangerous opponent on grass, resulting in him winning back to back Australian Opens.

== Personal life ==
He attended Afrikaanse Hoër Seunskool (Afrikaans High School for Boys, also known as Affies), a public school located in Pretoria. Kriek became a naturalized American citizen in August 1982. He currently resides in Palm Beach Gardens, Florida with his wife, Daga and their two children.

== Grand Slam finals ==
=== Singles: (2 titles) ===
Result	Year	Championship	Surface	Opponent	Score
Win	1981	Australian Open	Grass	(United States) Steve Denton	6–2, 7–6^{(7–1)}, 6–7^{(1–7)}, 6–4
Win	1982	Australian Open (2)	Grass	(United States) Steve Denton	6–3, 6–3, 6–2

== Career finals ==
=== Singles: 27 (14 titles / 13 runner-ups) ===
Result	W/L	Date	Tournament	Surface	Opponent	Score
Loss	0–1	Sep 1978	Hartford, U.S.	Carpet	(United States) John McEnroe	2–6, 4–6
Win	1–1	Feb 1979	Sarasota, U.S.	Carpet	(United States) Rick Meyer	7–6, 6–2
Loss	1–2	Oct 1979	Basel, Switzerland	Hard (i)	(United States) Brian Gottfried	5–7, 1–6, 6–4, 3–6
Loss	1–3	Mar 1980	Frankfurt, Germany	Carpet (i)	(United States) Stan Smith	6–2, 6–7, 2–6
Loss	1–4	Aug 1980	Stowe, U.S.	Hard	(United States) Bob Lutz	3–6, 1–6
Win	2–4	Jan 1981	Monterrey WCT, Mexico	Carpet (i)	(United States) Vitas Gerulaitis	7–6, 3–6, 7–6
Loss	2–5	May 1981	WCT Finals, Dallas	Carpet (i)	(United States) John McEnroe	1–6, 2–6, 4–6
Win	3–5	Jul 1981	Newport, U.S.	Grass	(United States) Hank Pfister	3–6, 6–3, 7–5
Win	4–5	Jan 1982	Australian Open, Melbourne	Grass	(United States) Steve Denton	6–2, 7–6, 6–7, 6–4
Win	5–5	Feb 1982	Memphis, U.S.	Hard (i)	(United States) John McEnroe	6–3, 3–6, 6–4
Loss	5–6	Feb 1982	Monterrey, Mexico	Carpet	(United States) Jimmy Connors	2–6, 6–3, 3–6
Win	6–6	Aug 1982	La Costa WCT, U.S.	Hard	(United States) Roscoe Tanner	6–0, 4–6, 6–0, 6–4
Win	7–6	Dec 1982	Australian Open, Melbourne	Grass	(United States) Steve Denton	6–3, 6–3, 6–2
Loss	7–7	Apr 1983	Los Angeles, U.S.	Hard	(United States) Gene Mayer	6–7, 1–6
Win	8–7	May 1983	Tampa, U.S.	Carpet	(United States) Bob Lutz	6–2, 6–4
Win	9–7	Jun 1983	Bristol, UK	Grass	(United States) Tom Gullikson	7–6, 7–5
Win	10–7	Nov 1983	Johannesburg, South Africa	Hard	(United Kingdom) Colin Dowdeswell	6–4, 4–6, 1–6, 7–5, 6–3
Loss	10–8	Mar 1984	Boca West, U.S.	Hard	(United States) Jimmy Connors	5–7, 4–6
Win	11–8	Jun 1984	Bristol, UK	Grass	(United States) Brian Teacher	6–7, 7–6, 6–4
Win	12–8	Aug 1984	Livingston, U.S.	Hard	(West Germany) Michael Westphal	6–2, 6–4
Win	13–8	May 1985	Las Vegas, U.S.	Hard	(United States) Jimmy Arias	4–6, 6–3, 6–4, 6–2
Loss	13–9	Jun 1985	London Queen's Club, UK	Grass	(West Germany) Boris Becker	2–6, 3–6
Loss	13–10	Sep 1985	San Francisco, U.S.	Hard (i)	(Sweden) Stefan Edberg	4–6, 2–6
Win	14–10	Jul 1987	Livingston, U.S.	Hard	(West Germany) Christian Saceanu	7–6, 3–6, 6–2
Loss	14–11	Jul 1988	Schenectady, U.S.	Hard	(United States) Tim Mayotte	7–5, 3–6, 2–6
Loss	14–12	Oct 1988	San Francisco, U.S.	Hard (i)	(United States) Michael Chang	2–6, 3–6
Loss	14–13	Feb 1989	Memphis, U.S.	Hard (i)	(United States) Brad Gilbert	2–6, 2–6, ret.

=== Doubles: 15 (8 titles / 7 runner-ups) ===
Result	W/L	Date	Tournament	Surface	Partner	Opponents	Score
Win	1–0	Feb 1980	Richmond WCT, U.S.	Carpet (i)	(United States) Fritz Buehning	(United States) Brian Gottfried (South Africa) Frew McMillan	3–6, 6–3, 7–6
Loss	1–1	Oct 1980	Sydney Indoor, Australia	Hard (i)	(United States) Tim Gullikson	(United States) Peter Fleming (United States) John McEnroe	6–4, 1–6, 2–6
Loss	1–2	Jan 1981	Monterrey WCT, Mexico	Carpet	(New Zealand) Russell Simpson	(South Africa) Kevin Curren (United States) Steve Denton	6–7, 2–6
Loss	1–3	Jun 1981	Bristol, UK	Grass	(United States) John Austin	(United States) Billy Martin (New Zealand) Russell Simpson	6–3, 3–6, 10–12
Win	2–3	Aug 1981	Stowe, U.S.	Hard	(United States) Larry Stefanki	(United States) Brian Gottfried (United States) Bob Lutz	2–6, 6–1, 6–2
Win	3–3	May 1982	Forest Hills WCT, U.S.	Clay	(United States) Tracy Delatte	(United States) Dick Stockton (United States) Erik van Dillen	6–3, 7–6
Win	4–3	Aug 1982	La Costa WCT, U.S.	Hard	(United States) Fritz Buehning	(United States) Bob Lutz (Mexico) Raúl Ramírez	3–6, 7–6, 6–3
Loss	4–4	Feb 1983	Delray Beach WCT, U.S.	Clay	(India) Anand Amritraj	(Czechoslovakia) Pavel Složil (Czechoslovakia) Tomáš Šmíd	6–7, 4–6
Loss	4–5	Apr 1983	Las Vegas, U.S.	Hard	(United States) Tracy Delatte	(South Africa) Kevin Curren (United States) Steve Denton	3–6, 5–7
Win	5–5	May 1983	Forest Hills WCT, U.S.	Clay	(United States) Tracy Delatte	(South Africa) Kevin Curren (United States) Steve Denton	7–6, 1–6, 6–1
Loss	5–6	Jun 1983	Bristol, UK	Grass	(United States) Tom Gullikson	(Australia) John Alexander (Australia) John Fitzgerald	5–7, 4–6
Loss	5–7	Nov 1983	Stockholm, Sweden	Hard (i)	(United States) Peter Fleming	(Sweden) Anders Järryd (Sweden) Hans Simonsson	6–7, 5–7
Win	6–7	Apr 1985	Chicago, U.S.	Carpet (i)	(France) Yannick Noah	(United States) Ken Flach (United States) Robert Seguso	3–6, 4–6, 7–5, 6–1, 6–4
Win	7–7	Feb 1988	Philadelphia, U.S.	Carpet (i)	(New Zealand) Kelly Evernden	(South Africa) Kevin Curren (South Africa) Danie Visser	7–6, 6–3
Win	8–7	Apr 1988	Tokyo Outdoor, Japan	Hard	(Australia) John Fitzgerald	(United States) Steve Denton (United States) David Pate	6–4, 6–4

== Grand Slam singles performance timeline ==
Key
W	F	SF	QF	#R	RR	Q#	DNQ	A	NH

(W) winner; (F) finalist; (SF) semifinalist; (QF) quarterfinalist; (#R) rounds 4, 3, 2, 1; (RR) round-robin stage; (Q#) qualification round; (DNQ) did not qualify; (A) absent; (NH) not held; (SR) strike rate (events won / competed); (W–L) win–loss record.

	South Africa					United States														
Tournament	1977	1978	1979	1980	1981	1982	1983	1984	1985	1986	1987	1988	1989	1990	1991	1992	1993	1994	SR	W–L
Australian Open	A/A	A	A	A	W	W	QF	SF	QF	NH	2R	2R	3R	A	A	A	A	A	2 / 8	25–6
French Open	A	A	1R	A	A	A	A	A	A	SF	1R	A	A	A	A	A	A	A	0 / 3	4–3
Wimbledon	A	2R	3R	3R	QF	QF	3R	4R	3R	2R	4R	1R	1R	A	1R	A	A	A	0 / 13	24–13
US Open	A	QF	QF	SF	3R	3R	4R	3R	2R	3R	3R	3R	1R	A	A	A	A	A	0 / 12	29–12
Win–loss	0–0	5–2	6–3	7–2	12–2	12–2	8–3	9–3	6–3	7–3	5–4	3–3	2–3	0–0	0–1	0–0	0–0	0–0	2 / 36	82–34
Year-end ranking	278	27	35	18	13	12	15	13	14	23	48	39	52	413	274	1097	1178	861		
