= Hank Pfister =

American tennis player

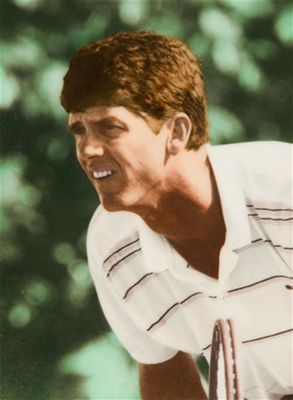
- Country (sports): United States
- Residence: Bakersfield, California
- Born: October 9, 1953 (age 73) Bakersfield, California
- Height: 6 ft 4 in (1.93 m)
- Turned pro: 1977
- Retired: 1988
- Plays: Right-handed (one-handed backhand)
- Prize money: $873,335

Singles
- Career record: 259–211
- Career titles: 2
- Highest ranking: No. 19 (May 2, 1983)

Grand Slam singles results
- Australian Open: SF (1978, 1981, 1982)
- French Open: 2R (1978)
- Wimbledon: 4R (1978, 1980, 1982)
- US Open: 3R (1979, 1980)

Doubles
- Career record: 277–217
- Career titles: 11
- Highest ranking: No. 12 (December 13, 1982)

Grand Slam doubles results
- Australian Open: F (1981)
- French Open: W (1978, 1980)
- Wimbledon: QF (1980)
- US Open: F (1982)

Hank Pfister (born October 9, 1953) is a former tennis player from the United States, who competed on the professional tour in the late 1970s and the 1980s. He won two singles titles (1981, Maui and 1982, Newport) and 11 doubles titles during his professional career. The right-hander reached his highest individual ranking on the ATP Tour on May 2, 1983, when he became world No. 19. He twice won the doubles title at the French Open, in 1978 with Gene Mayer and in 1981 partnering Victor Amaya.

Being tall of stature, sturdy of build and possessing a fast serve, his style was highlighted by use of the serve and volley game.

Pfister was an All-American at San Jose State. After his playing career he became director of tennis at the Stockdale Country Club. He was inducted into the Bob Elias Kern County Sports Hall of Fame in 1990. The Kern Community Tennis Association has named their annual Hank Pfister Sportsmanship Award in his honor, which is given to a graduating senior who has played at least two years of high school tennis. The Pfister Cup, an annual tournament between the top junior college men's tennis programs from Northern and Southern California, is named after him.

== Career finals ==
=== Singles: 7 (2 titles / 5 runner-ups) ===
Result	W/L	Date	Tournament	Surface	Opponent	Score
Loss	0–1	Jul 1977	Newport, U.S.	Grass	(United States) Tim Gullikson	1–6, 5–7
Loss	0–2	Feb 1978	Little Rock, U.S.	Carpet	(United States) Dick Stockton	4–6, 5–3, ret.
Loss	0–3	Oct 1979	Sydney, Australia	Grass	(Australia) Phil Dent	4–6, 4–6, 5–7
Loss	0–4	Jul 1981	Newport, U.S.	Grass	(South Africa) Johan Kriek	6–3, 3–6, 5–7
Win	1–4	Sep 1981	Maui, U.S.	Hard	(United States) Tim Mayotte	6–4, 6–4
Win	2–4	Jul 1982	Newport, U.S.	Grass	(United States) Mike Estep	6–1, 7–5
Loss	2–5	Aug 1984	Columbus, U.S.	Hard	(United States) Brad Gilbert	3–6, 6–3, 3–6

Source: ATP

=== Doubles: 27 (11 titles / 16 runner-ups) ===
Result	W/L	Date	Tournament	Surface	Partner	Opponents	Score
Loss	0–1	Jan 1976	Birmingham, U.S.	Carpet	(United States) Dennis Ralston	(United States) Jimmy Connors (United States) Erik van Dillen	6–7, 4–6
Win	1–1	Nov 1976	Hong Kong	Hard	(United States) Butch Walts	(India) Anand Amritraj (Romania) Ilie Năstase	6–4, 6–2
Win	2–1	Feb 1977	Dayton, U.S.	Carpet	(United States) Butch Walts	(United States) Jeff Borowiak (Rhodesia) Andrew Pattison	6–4, 7–6
Loss	2–2	Apr 1978	Dayton, U.S.	Carpet	(United States) Butch Walts	(United States) Brian Gottfried (Australia) Geoff Masters	3–6, 4–6
Loss	2–3	Apr 1978	San Jose, U.S.	Carpet	(United States) Brad Rowe	(United States) Gene Mayer (United States) Sandy Mayer	3–6, 4–6
Win	3–3	Jun 1978	French Open, Paris	Clay	(United States) Gene Mayer	(Spain) Manuel Orantes (Spain) José Higueras	6–3, 6–2, 6–2
Win	4–3	Aug 1978	Indianapolis, U.S.	Clay	(United States) Gene Mayer	(United States) Jeff Borowiak (New Zealand) Chris Lewis	6–3, 6–1
Loss	4–4	Nov 1978	Hong Kong	Hard	(United States) Brad Rowe	(Australia) Mark Edmondson (Australia) John Marks	7–5, 6–7, 1–6
Win	5–4	Dec 1978	Sydney Outdoor, Australia	Grass	(United States) Sherwood Stewart	(Australia) Syd Ball (Australia) Bob Carmichael	6–4, 6–4
Loss	5–5	Apr 1979	San Jose, U.S.	Carpet	(United States) Brad Rowe	(United States) Peter Fleming (United States) John McEnroe	3–6, 4–6
Win	6–5	Jun 1980	French Open, Paris	Clay	(United States) Victor Amaya	(United States) Brian Gottfried (Mexico) Raúl Ramírez	1–6, 6–4, 6–4, 6–3
Loss	6–6	Oct 1980	Maui, Hawaii, U.S.	Hard	(United States) Victor Amaya	(United States) Peter Fleming (United States) John McEnroe	6–7, 7–6, 2–6
Win	7–6	Nov 1980	Tokyo Indoor	Carpet	(United States) Victor Amaya	(United States) Marty Riessen (United States) Sherwood Stewart	6–3, 3–6, 7–6
Loss	7–7	Jan 1981	Masters Doubles, London	Carpet	(United States) Victor Amaya	(Australia) Peter McNamara (Australia) Paul McNamee	3–6, 6–2, 6–3, 3–6, 2–6
Win	8–7	Oct 1981	Tokyo Indoor	Carpet	(United States) Victor Amaya	(Switzerland) Heinz Günthardt (Hungary) Balázs Taróczy	6–4, 6–2
Loss	8–8	Dec 1981	Sydney Outdoor, Australia	Grass	(United States) John Sadri	(Australia) Peter McNamara (Australia) Paul McNamee	7–6, 6–7, 6–7
Loss	8–9	Jan 1982	Australian Open, Melbourne	Grass	(United States) John Sadri	(Australia) Mark Edmondson (Australia) Kim Warwick	3–6, 7–6, 3–6
Win	9–9	Feb 1982	Monterrey, Mexico	Carpet	(United States) Victor Amaya	(United States) Tracy Delatte (United States) Mel Purcell	6–3, 6–7, 6–3
Loss	9–10	May 1982	Tampa, U.S.	Hard	(United States) Brian Gottfried	(United States) Tim Gullikson (United States) Tom Gullikson	2–6, 3–6
Loss	9–11	Jun 1982	Queen's Club, London, UK	Grass	(United States) Victor Amaya	(United States) John McEnroe (United States) Peter Rennert	6–7, 5–7
Loss	9–12	Aug 1982	Columbus, U.S.	Hard	(United States) Victor Amaya	(United States) Tim Gullikson (South Africa) Bernard Mitton	6–4, 1–6, 4–6
Win	10–12	Aug 1982	Cleveland, U.S.	Hard	(United States) Victor Amaya	(United States) Matt Mitchell (United States) Craig Wittus	6–4, 7–6
Loss	10–13	Sep 1982	US Open, New York	Hard	(United States) Victor Amaya	(South Africa) Kevin Curren (United States) Steve Denton	2–6, 7–6, 7–5, 2–6, 4–6
Win	11–13	Sep 1982	Los Angeles-2 WCT, U.S.	Carpet	(South Africa) Kevin Curren	(United States) Andy Andrews (United States) Drew Gitlin	4–6, 6–2, 7–5
Loss	11–14	Nov 1984	Taipei, Taiwan	Carpet	(United States) Drew Gitlin	(United States) Ken Flach (United States) Robert Seguso	1–6, 7–6, 2–6
Loss	11–15	Feb 1985	Houston, U.S.	Carpet	(United States) Ben Testerman	(United States) Peter Fleming (United States) John McEnroe	3–6, 2–6
Loss	11–16	Aug 1985	Cleveland, U.S.	Hard	(United States) Ben Testerman	(Finland) Leo Palin (Finland) Olli Rahnasto	3–6, 7–6, 6–7

Source: ATP

== Grand Slam performance timeline ==
Key
W	F	SF	QF	#R	RR	Q#	DNQ	A	NH

(W) winner; (F) finalist; (SF) semifinalist; (QF) quarterfinalist; (#R) rounds 4, 3, 2, 1; (RR) round-robin stage; (Q#) qualification round; (DNQ) did not qualify; (A) absent; (NH) not held; (SR) strike rate (events won / competed); (W–L) win–loss record.

=== Singles ===
Tournament	1977		1978	1979	1980	1981	1982	1983	1984	1985	1986	1987	1988	W–L	Win %
Australian Open	1R	A	SF	1R	1R	SF	SF	2R	3R	A	A	A	1R	0–0	–
French Open	A		2R	1R	1R	1R	A	A	A	A	A	A	A	0–0	–
Wimbledon	1R		4R	3R	4R	A	4R	2R	1R	1R	A	A	A	0–0	–
US Open	1R		2R	3R	3R	1R	2R	A	A	2R	A	A	A	0–0	–
Win–loss	0–3										0–0	0–0	0–1	0–0	–

Source: World Tennis
