= 1980 Grand Prix (tennis) =

Tennis circuit

1980 Grand Prix circuit
Details
- Duration: 1 January 1980 – 26 December 1980
- Edition: 11th
- Tournaments: 83
- Categories: Grand Slam (4); Grand Prix (71); World Championship Tennis (8); Team Events (1)

Achievements (singles)
- Most titles: (United States) John McEnroe (9)
- Most finals: (United States) John McEnroe (15)
- Prize money leader: (Sweden) Björn Borg
- Points leader: (United States) John McEnroe (2,342)

Awards
- Player of the year: (Sweden) Björn Borg
- Comeback player of the year: (United States) Arthur Ashe

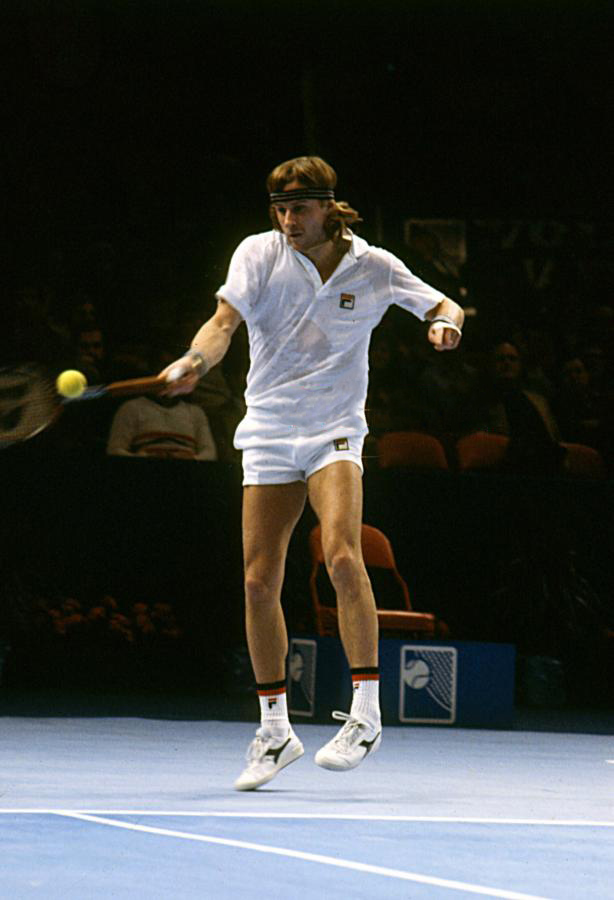
Björn Borg finished the year as ATP world No. 1 for the second time in his career. Borg won eight titles during the season, including two majors at the French Open and the Wimbledon Championships, as well as the Masters Grand Prix. He also finished runner-up at another major at the US Open.

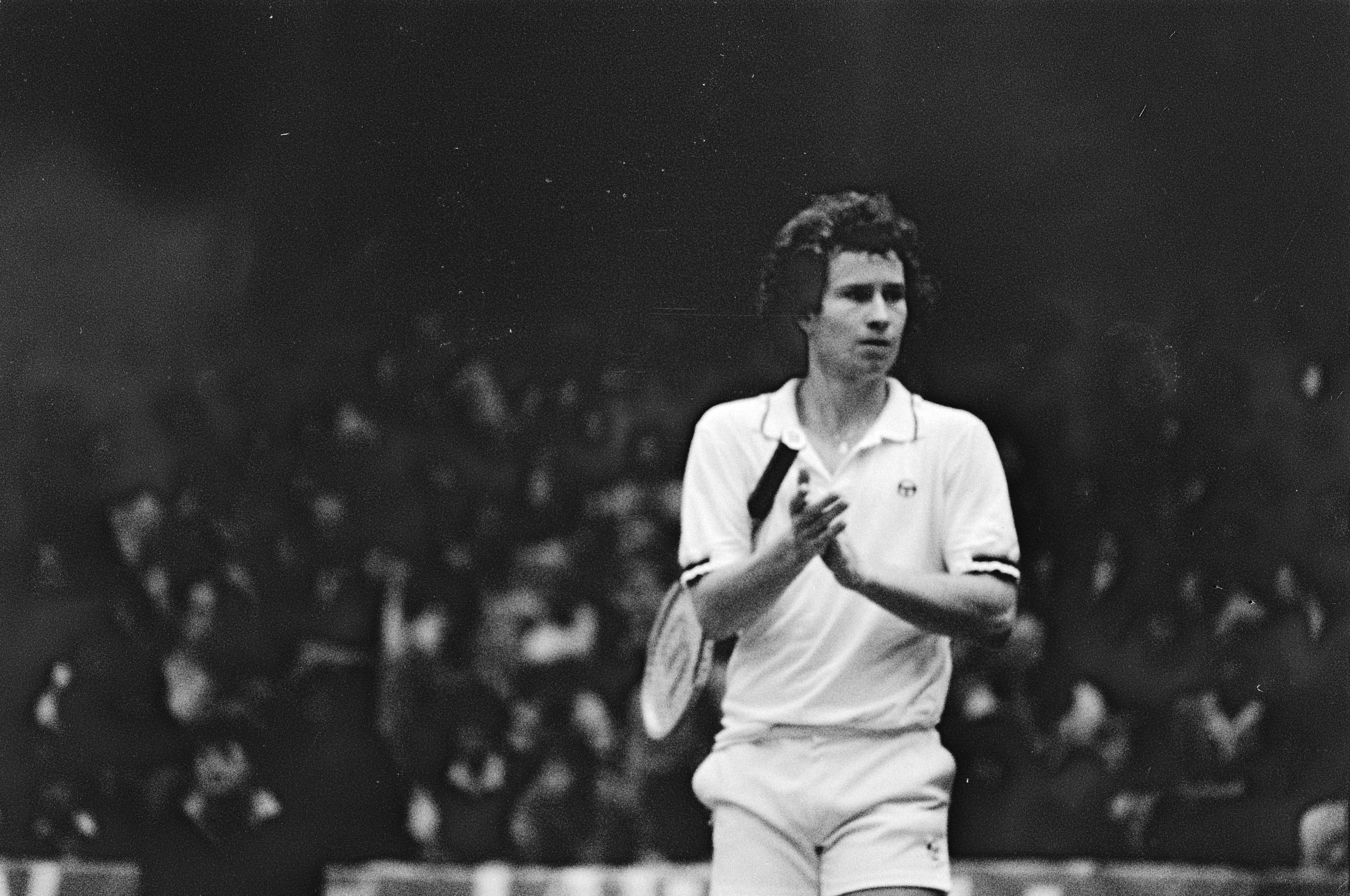
John McEnroe was the 1980 Grand Prix No. 1. McEnroe won nine tournaments during the season, including a major at the US Open, and finished runner-up at another major at the Wimbledon Championships.

The 1980 Volvo Grand Prix was a men's professional tennis circuit held that year. It incorporated the four grand slam tournaments, the Grand Prix tournaments. The Grand Prix circuit is a precursor to the ATP Tour.

Volvo became the new tour sponsor of the Grand Prix circuit after Colgate-Palmolive decided to end its sponsorship. Eight World Championship Tennis tournaments were incorporated into the circuit.

== Schedule ==
The table below shows the 1980 Volvo Grand Prix schedule.

Key

Grand Slam tournaments
Tour finals
Super Series
Regular Series

=== January ===
Week	Tournament	Champions	Runners-up	Semifinalists	Quarterfinalists
31 Dec 1979	Australian Hard Court Championships; Hobart, Australia; Hard – $50,000 – 32S/16D; Singles – Doubles	(Israel) Shlomo Glickstein; 7–6, 6–4	(United States) Robert Van't Hof	(Australia) Terry Rocavert (United States) Rick Fisher	(South Africa) Raymond Moore (Australia) John Marks (Australia) Chris Kachel (Australia) Syd Ball
31 Dec 1979	Australian Hard Court Championships; Hobart, Australia; Hard – $50,000 – 32S/16D; Singles – Doubles	(Australia) John James (Australia) Chris Kachel; 6–4, 6–4	(Australia) Phil Davies (Australia) Brad Guan	(Australia) Terry Rocavert (United States) Rick Fisher	(South Africa) Raymond Moore (Australia) John Marks (Australia) Chris Kachel (Australia) Syd Ball
31 Dec 1979	Benson and Hedges Open; Auckland, New Zealand; Hard – $50,000 – 32S/16D; Singles – Doubles	(United States) John Sadri; 6–4, 3–6, 6–3, 6–4	(United States) Tim Wilkison	(Australia) Rod Frawley (Austria) Peter Feigl	(New Zealand) Russell Simpson (United States) John Austin (Australia) Paul McNamee (Australia) Dick Crealy
31 Dec 1979	Benson and Hedges Open; Auckland, New Zealand; Hard – $50,000 – 32S/16D; Singles – Doubles	(Austria) Peter Feigl (Australia) Rod Frawley; 6–2, 7–5	(United States) John Sadri (United States) Tim Wilkison	(Australia) Rod Frawley (Austria) Peter Feigl	(New Zealand) Russell Simpson (United States) John Austin (Australia) Paul McNamee (Australia) Dick Crealy
31 Dec 1979	Masters Doubles WCT; Great Britain; Carpet (i) – $200,000 – 8D	(Mexico) Raúl Ramírez (United States) Brian Gottfried; 3–6, 6–4, 6–4, 3–6, 6–3	(Poland) Wojciech Fibak (Netherlands) Tom Okker		
14 Jan	Baltimore International; Baltimore, Maryland, US; Carpet (i) – $75,000 – 32S/16D	(United States) Harold Solomon; 7–6, 6–0	(United States) Tim Gullikson	(United States) Marty Riessen (United States) Brian Gottfried	(New Zealand) Chris Lewis (United States) Brian Teacher (Australia) Mark Edmondson (United States) Bruce Manson
14 Jan	Baltimore International; Baltimore, Maryland, US; Carpet (i) – $75,000 – 32S/16D	(United States) Marty Riessen (United States) Tim Gullikson; 2–6, 6–3, 6–4	(United States) Brian Gottfried (South Africa) Frew McMillan	(United States) Marty Riessen (United States) Brian Gottfried	(New Zealand) Chris Lewis (United States) Brian Teacher (Australia) Mark Edmondson (United States) Bruce Manson
14 Jan	Birmingham Open (WCT); Birmingham, Alabama, US; Carpet (i) – $175,000 – 32S/16D; Singles – Doubles	(United States) Jimmy Connors; 6–3, 6–2	(United States) Eliot Teltscher	(United States) Butch Walts (India) Vijay Amritraj	(United States) Eddie Dibbs (Romania) Ilie Năstase (United Kingdom) Buster Mottram (United States) Vitas Gerulaitis
14 Jan	Birmingham Open (WCT); Birmingham, Alabama, US; Carpet (i) – $175,000 – 32S/16D; Singles – Doubles	(Netherlands) Tom Okker (Poland) Wojciech Fibak; 6–3, 6–3	(Argentina) José Luis Clerc (Romania) Ilie Năstase	(United States) Butch Walts (India) Vijay Amritraj	(United States) Eddie Dibbs (Romania) Ilie Năstase (United Kingdom) Buster Mottram (United States) Vitas Gerulaitis
21 Jan	US Pro Indoor (WCT); Philadelphia, Pennsylvania, US; Carpet (i) – $250,000 – 64S/32D; Singles – Doubles	(United States) Jimmy Connors; 6–3, 2–6, 6–3, 3–6, 6–4	(United States) John McEnroe	(United States) Gene Mayer (United States) John Sadri	(Poland) Wojciech Fibak (United States) Bill Scanlon (United States) Harold Solomon (Argentina) José Luis Clerc
21 Jan	US Pro Indoor (WCT); Philadelphia, Pennsylvania, US; Carpet (i) – $250,000 – 64S/32D; Singles – Doubles	(United States) John McEnroe (United States) Peter Fleming; 6–3, 7–6	(United States) Brian Gottfried (Mexico) Raúl Ramírez	(United States) Gene Mayer (United States) John Sadri	(Poland) Wojciech Fibak (United States) Bill Scanlon (United States) Harold Solomon (Argentina) José Luis Clerc
28 Jan	United Virginia Bank Classic (WCT); Richmond, Virginia, US; Carpet (i) – $175,000 – 32S/16D	(United States) John McEnroe; 6–1, 6–2	(United States) Roscoe Tanner	(United States) Victor Amaya (Argentina) Guillermo Vilas	(Poland) Wojciech Fibak (South Africa) Johan Kriek (United States) John Sadri (United States) Bill Scanlon
28 Jan	United Virginia Bank Classic (WCT); Richmond, Virginia, US; Carpet (i) – $175,000 – 32S/16D	(South Africa) Johan Kriek (United States) Fritz Buehning; 3–6, 6–3, 7–6^{(7–3)}	(United States) Brian Gottfried (South Africa) Frew McMillan	(United States) Victor Amaya (Argentina) Guillermo Vilas	(Poland) Wojciech Fibak (South Africa) Johan Kriek (United States) John Sadri (United States) Bill Scanlon
28 Jan	San Juan, Puerto Rico, US; Hard – $75,000 – 32S/16D	(Mexico) Raúl Ramírez; 6–3, 6–2	(Australia) Phil Dent	(United States) Tom Gorman (United States) Vince Van Patten	(United States) Billy Martin (United States) Tim Wilkison (South Africa) Robert Trogolo (Australia) Paul McNamee
28 Jan	San Juan, Puerto Rico, US; Hard – $75,000 – 32S/16D	(Australia) Paul McNamee (Australia) Paul Kronk; 7–6, 6–3 (Note: Doubles event not officially listed by ATP.)	(South Africa) Robert Trogolo (United States) Mark Turpin	(United States) Tom Gorman (United States) Vince Van Patten	(United States) Billy Martin (United States) Tim Wilkison (South Africa) Robert Trogolo (Australia) Paul McNamee

=== February ===
Week	Tournament	Champions	Runners-up	Semifinalists	Quarterfinalists
4 Feb	Pepsi Grand Slam; Boca Raton, Florida, US; Clay – $300,000 – 4S	(Sweden) Björn Borg; 6–1, 5–7, 6–1	(United States) Vitas Gerulaitis	(Argentina) Guillermo Vilas (United States) John McEnroe	
11 Feb	Congoleum Classic; Rancho Mirage, California, US; Hard – $250,000 – 64S/32D	No final due to rain. The semi–finalists J. Connors, B. Teacher, P. Fleming and G. Mayer shared the prize money.			(United States) Harold Solomon (Zimbabwe) Andrew Pattison (Argentina) Guillermo Vilas (United States) Hank Pfister
11 Feb	Sarasota, Florida, US; Clay – $50,000 – 32S/16D	(United States) Eddie Dibbs; 6–1, 6–3	(Ecuador) Andrés Gómez	(Australia) David Carter (South Africa) Deon Joubert	(Spain) José Higueras (United States) Charles Owens (United States) Robert Van't Hof (United States) Michael Grant
11 Feb	Sarasota, Florida, US; Clay – $50,000 – 32S/16D	(Ecuador) Ricardo Ycaza (Ecuador) Andrés Gómez; 6–3, 6–4	(Australia) David Carter (United States) Rick Fagel	(Australia) David Carter (South Africa) Deon Joubert	(Spain) José Higueras (United States) Charles Owens (United States) Robert Van't Hof (United States) Michael Grant
18 Feb	United Bank Classic; Denver, Colorado, US; Carpet (i) – $125,000 – 32S/16D	(United States) Gene Mayer; 6–2, 6–2	(United States) Victor Amaya	(United States) Vince Van Patten (United States) Stan Smith	(United States) Roscoe Tanner (United States) Brian Gottfried (Ecuador) Andrés Gómez (United States) Fritz Buehning
18 Feb	United Bank Classic; Denver, Colorado, US; Carpet (i) – $125,000 – 32S/16D	(United States) Steve Denton (South Africa) Kevin Curren; 7–5, 6–2	(Poland) Wojciech Fibak (Switzerland) Heinz Günthardt	(United States) Vince Van Patten (United States) Stan Smith	(United States) Roscoe Tanner (United States) Brian Gottfried (Ecuador) Andrés Gómez (United States) Fritz Buehning
25 Feb	Lagos, Nigeria; Hard – $50,000 – 32S/16D	(Austria) Peter Feigl; 6–2, 6–3, 6–2	(Canada) Harry Fritz	(United States) Chris Mayotte (West Germany) Werner Zirngibl	(Sweden) Kjell Johansson (Egypt) Ismail El Shafei (West Germany) Peter Elter (India) Sashi Menon
25 Feb	Lagos, Nigeria; Hard – $50,000 – 32S/16D	(United States) Bruce Nichols (United States) Tony Graham; 6–3, 0–6, 6–3	(Sweden) Kjell Johansson (Finland) Leo Palin	(United States) Chris Mayotte (West Germany) Werner Zirngibl	(Sweden) Kjell Johansson (Egypt) Ismail El Shafei (West Germany) Peter Elter (India) Sashi Menon
25 Feb	U.S. National Indoor Championships; Memphis, Tennessee, US; Carpet (i) – $250,000 – 48S / 24D	(United States) John McEnroe; 7–6^{(8–6)}, 7–6^{(7–4)}	(United States) Jimmy Connors	(South Africa) Bernard Mitton (United States) Harold Solomon	(United States) Robert Lutz (United States) Sherwood Stewart (United States) Roscoe Tanner (United States) John Sadri
25 Feb	U.S. National Indoor Championships; Memphis, Tennessee, US; Carpet (i) – $250,000 – 48S / 24D	(United States) John McEnroe (United States) Brian Gottfried; 6–3, 6–7, 7–6	(Australia) Rod Frawley (Czechoslovakia) Tomáš Šmíd	(South Africa) Bernard Mitton (United States) Harold Solomon	(United States) Robert Lutz (United States) Sherwood Stewart (United States) Roscoe Tanner (United States) John Sadri

=== March ===
Week	Tournament	Champions	Runners-up	Semifinalists	Quarterfinalists
3 Mar	Egyptian Open; Cairo, Egypt; Clay – $75,000 – 32S/16D	(Italy) Corrado Barazzutti; 6–4, 6–0	(Italy) Paolo Bertolucci	(France) Patrice Dominguez (France) Christophe Freyss	(Czechoslovakia) Jiří Hřebec (Socialist Federal Republic of Yugoslavia) Željko Franulović (Australia) Terry Rocavert (Sweden) Kjell Johansson
3 Mar	Egyptian Open; Cairo, Egypt; Clay – $75,000 – 32S/16D	(Netherlands) Tom Okker (Egypt) Ismail El Shafei; 6–3, 3–6, 6–3	(France) Christophe Freyss (France) Bernard Fritz	(France) Patrice Dominguez (France) Christophe Freyss	(Czechoslovakia) Jiří Hřebec (Socialist Federal Republic of Yugoslavia) Željko Franulović (Australia) Terry Rocavert (Sweden) Kjell Johansson
3 Mar	Volvo Tennis Classic; Washington, D.C., US; Carpet (i) – $125,000 – 32S/16D	(United States) Victor Amaya; 6–7^{(5–7)}, 6–4, 7–5	(Czechoslovakia) Ivan Lendl	(United States) Eddie Dibbs (United States) Eliot Teltscher	(United States) Roscoe Tanner (United States) John Sadri (United States) Brian Teacher (United States) Harold Solomon
3 Mar	Volvo Tennis Classic; Washington, D.C., US; Carpet (i) – $125,000 – 32S/16D	(United States) Ferdi Taygan (United States) Brian Teacher; 4–6, 6–3, 7–6	(South Africa) Kevin Curren (United States) Steve Denton	(United States) Eddie Dibbs (United States) Eliot Teltscher	(United States) Roscoe Tanner (United States) John Sadri (United States) Brian Teacher (United States) Harold Solomon
10 Mar	ABN World Tennis Tournament (WCT); Rotterdam, Netherlands; Carpet (i) – $175,000 – 32S/16D; Singles	(Switzerland) Heinz Günthardt; 6–2, 6–4	(United States) Gene Mayer	(Australia) Paul McNamee (Czechoslovakia) Ivan Lendl	(United States) Chris Delaney (India) Vijay Amritraj (Romania) Ilie Năstase (United States) John Sadri
10 Mar	ABN World Tennis Tournament (WCT); Rotterdam, Netherlands; Carpet (i) – $175,000 – 32S/16D; Singles	(United States) Stan Smith (India) Vijay Amritraj; 6–4, 6–3	(United States) Bill Scanlon (United States) Brian Teacher	(Australia) Paul McNamee (Czechoslovakia) Ivan Lendl	(United States) Chris Delaney (India) Vijay Amritraj (Romania) Ilie Năstase (United States) John Sadri
10 Mar	Friendship Tournament; San José, Costa Rica; Hard – $50,000 – 32S/16D	(Argentina) José Luis Clerc; 4–6, 2–6, ret.	(United States) Jimmy Connors	(United States) John Austin (United States) Steve Krulevitz	(United States) George Hardie (United States) Erik van Dillen (India) Sashi Menon (India) Anand Amritraj
10 Mar	Friendship Tournament; San José, Costa Rica; Hard – $50,000 – 32S/16D	(Chile) Álvaro Fillol (Chile) Jaime Fillol; 6–2, 7–6	(India) Anand Amritraj (United States) Nick Saviano	(United States) John Austin (United States) Steve Krulevitz	(United States) George Hardie (United States) Erik van Dillen (India) Sashi Menon (India) Anand Amritraj
10 Mar	Stuttgart Indoor; Stuttgart, West Germany; Hard (i) – $75,000 – 32S/16D	(Czechoslovakia) Tomáš Šmíd; 6–1, 6–3, 5–7, 1–6, 6–4	(United Kingdom) Mark Cox	(Australia) Rod Frawley (Australia) Kim Warwick	(Poland) Wojciech Fibak (West Germany) Reinhart Probst (Sweden) Tenny Svensson (France) Patrick Proisy
10 Mar	Stuttgart Indoor; Stuttgart, West Germany; Hard (i) – $75,000 – 32S/16D	(Czechoslovakia) Tomáš Šmíd (Poland) Wojciech Fibak; 6–4, 7–6	(United States) Tim Mayotte (United States) Larry Stefanki	(Australia) Rod Frawley (Australia) Kim Warwick	(Poland) Wojciech Fibak (West Germany) Reinhart Probst (Sweden) Tenny Svensson (France) Patrick Proisy
17 Mar	Trevira Cup (WCT); Frankfurt, West Germany; Carpet (i) – $175,000 – 32S/16D	(United States) Stan Smith; 2–6, 7–6, 6–2	(South Africa) Johan Kriek	(United States) Tim Gullikson (United States) Brian Gottfried	(Czechoslovakia) Tomáš Šmíd (Mexico) Raúl Ramírez (Switzerland) Heinz Günthardt (United States) Butch Walts
17 Mar	Trevira Cup (WCT); Frankfurt, West Germany; Carpet (i) – $175,000 – 32S/16D	(United States) Stan Smith (India) Vijay Amritraj; 6–7, 6–2, 6–2	(Zimbabwe) Andrew Pattison (United States) Butch Walts	(United States) Tim Gullikson (United States) Brian Gottfried	(Czechoslovakia) Tomáš Šmíd (Mexico) Raúl Ramírez (Switzerland) Heinz Günthardt (United States) Butch Walts
17 Mar	Lorraine Open; Metz, France; Hard (i) – $50,000 – 32S/16D	(United States) Gene Mayer; 6–3, 6–3, 6–0	(Italy) Gianni Ocleppo	(Australia) Peter McNamara (Australia) Colin Dibley	(United States) Chris Delaney (Republic of Ireland) Sean Sorensen (Brazil) Carlos Kirmayr (France) Christophe Roger-Vasselin
17 Mar	Lorraine Open; Metz, France; Hard (i) – $50,000 – 32S/16D	(United States) Gene Mayer (Australia) Colin Dibley; 7–6, 7–5	(United States) Chris Delaney (Australia) Kim Warwick	(Australia) Peter McNamara (Australia) Colin Dibley	(United States) Chris Delaney (Republic of Ireland) Sean Sorensen (Brazil) Carlos Kirmayr (France) Christophe Roger-Vasselin
24 Mar	Dayton Pro Tennis Classic; Dayton, Ohio, US; Carpet (i) – $75,000 – 32S/16D	(Poland) Wojciech Fibak; 7–6^{(7–4)}, 6–3	(United States) Bruce Manson	(Australia) Geoff Masters (South Africa) Bernard Mitton	(India) Sashi Menon (United States) Marty Riessen (United States) Brian Teacher (United States) John Whitlinger
24 Mar	Dayton Pro Tennis Classic; Dayton, Ohio, US; Carpet (i) – $75,000 – 32S/16D	(Australia) Geoff Masters (Poland) Wojciech Fibak; 6–4, 6–4	(United States) Fritz Buehning (United States) Fred McNair	(Australia) Geoff Masters (South Africa) Bernard Mitton	(India) Sashi Menon (United States) Marty Riessen (United States) Brian Teacher (United States) John Whitlinger
24 Mar	Ramazzotti Cup (WCT); Milan, Italy; Carpet (i) – $200,000 – 32S/16D	(United States) John McEnroe; 6–1, 6–4	(India) Vijay Amritraj	(Czechoslovakia) Ivan Lendl (Australia) Rod Frawley	(Zimbabwe) Andrew Pattison (United States) Bill Scanlon (Argentina) José Luis Clerc (United States) Peter Fleming
24 Mar	Ramazzotti Cup (WCT); Milan, Italy; Carpet (i) – $200,000 – 32S/16D	(United States) John McEnroe (United States) Peter Fleming; 6–2, 6–7, 6–2	(Zimbabwe) Andrew Pattison (United States) Butch Walts	(Czechoslovakia) Ivan Lendl (Australia) Rod Frawley	(Zimbabwe) Andrew Pattison (United States) Bill Scanlon (Argentina) José Luis Clerc (United States) Peter Fleming
24 Mar	Nice International Open; Nice, France; Clay – $50,000 – 32S/16D	(Sweden) Björn Borg; 6–2, 6–0, 6–1	(Spain) Manuel Orantes	(Spain) Fernando Luna (Italy) Corrado Barazzutti	(Australia) Peter McNamara (West Germany) Peter Elter (Colombia) Jairo Velasco, Sr. (France) Gilles Moretton
24 Mar	Nice International Open; Nice, France; Clay – $50,000 – 32S/16D	(Australia) Kim Warwick (United States) Chris Delaney; 6–4, 6–0	(Czechoslovakia) Stanislav Birner (Czechoslovakia) Jiří Hřebec	(Spain) Fernando Luna (Italy) Corrado Barazzutti	(Australia) Peter McNamara (West Germany) Peter Elter (Colombia) Jairo Velasco, Sr. (France) Gilles Moretton
31 Mar	Monte Carlo Open (WCT); Roquebrune-Cap-Martin, France; Clay – $187,000 – 32S/16D	(Sweden) Björn Borg; 6–1, 6–0, 6–2	(Argentina) Guillermo Vilas	(United States) Vitas Gerulaitis (Czechoslovakia) Tomáš Šmíd	(Argentina) José Luis Clerc (Chile) Hans Gildemeister (France) Jean-François Caujolle (United States) John McEnroe
31 Mar	Monte Carlo Open (WCT); Roquebrune-Cap-Martin, France; Clay – $187,000 – 32S/16D	(Italy) Adriano Panatta (Italy) Paolo Bertolucci; 6–2, 5–7, 6–3	(United States) Vitas Gerulaitis (United States) John McEnroe	(United States) Vitas Gerulaitis (Czechoslovakia) Tomáš Šmíd	(Argentina) José Luis Clerc (Chile) Hans Gildemeister (France) Jean-François Caujolle (United States) John McEnroe
31 Mar	Gulf States Tennis Classic; New Orleans, Louisiana, US; Carpet (i) – $75,000 – 32S/16D	(Poland) Wojciech Fibak; 6–4, 7–5	(United States) Eliot Teltscher	(United States) Ferdi Taygan (United States) Terry Moor	(United States) Roscoe Tanner (United States) Brian Teacher (United States) Bruce Manson (United States) Vincent Van Patten
31 Mar	Gulf States Tennis Classic; New Orleans, Louisiana, US; Carpet (i) – $75,000 – 32S/16D	(United States) Eliot Teltscher (United States) Terry Moor; 7–6, 6–1	(South Africa) Raymond Moore (South Africa) Robert Trogolo	(United States) Ferdi Taygan (United States) Terry Moor	(United States) Roscoe Tanner (United States) Brian Teacher (United States) Bruce Manson (United States) Vincent Van Patten
31 Mar	Robinson's Tennis Open; Palm Harbor, Florida, US; Hard – $50,000 – 32S/16D	(Australia) Paul McNamee; 6–4, 6–3	(United States) Stan Smith	(South Africa) Bernard Mitton (United States) Mike Cahill	(United States) Steve Krulevitz (United States) George Hardie (Australia) Steve Docherty (South Africa) Byron Bertram
31 Mar	Robinson's Tennis Open; Palm Harbor, Florida, US; Hard – $50,000 – 32S/16D	(Australia) Paul McNamee (Australia) Paul Kronk; 6–4, 7–5	(Australia) Steve Docherty (Australia) John James	(South Africa) Bernard Mitton (United States) Mike Cahill	(United States) Steve Krulevitz (United States) George Hardie (Australia) Steve Docherty (South Africa) Byron Bertram

=== April ===
Week	Tournament	Champions	Runners-up	Semifinalists	Quarterfinalists
7 Apr	Houston (WCT), Texas, US; Clay – $175,000 – 32S/16D	(Czechoslovakia) Ivan Lendl; 6–1, 6–3	(United States) Eddie Dibbs	(United States) Brian Gottfried (United States) Bill Scanlon	(Spain) José Higueras (United States) Marty Riessen (Australia) Rod Frawley (United States) Eliot Teltscher
7 Apr	Houston (WCT), Texas, US; Clay – $175,000 – 32S/16D	(Australia) Peter McNamara (Australia) Paul McNamee; 6–4, 6–4	(United States) Marty Riessen (United States) Sherwood Stewart	(United States) Brian Gottfried (United States) Bill Scanlon	(Spain) José Higueras (United States) Marty Riessen (Australia) Rod Frawley (United States) Eliot Teltscher
7 Apr	Bank of Oklahoma Classic; Tulsa, Oklahoma, US; Hard – $50,000 – 32S/16D	(United States) Howard Schoenfield; 5–7, 6–1, 6–0	(United States) Trey Waltke	(United States) Van Winitsky (United States) Robert Lutz	(United States) Randy Crawford (United States) Bruce Manson (United States) Joel Bailey (United States) Steve Krulevitz
7 Apr	Bank of Oklahoma Classic; Tulsa, Oklahoma, US; Hard – $50,000 – 32S/16D	(United States) Dick Stockton (United States) Robert Lutz; 2–6, 7–6, 6–2	(Paraguay) Francisco González (United States) Van Winitsky	(United States) Van Winitsky (United States) Robert Lutz	(United States) Randy Crawford (United States) Bruce Manson (United States) Joel Bailey (United States) Steve Krulevitz
7 Apr	Johannesburg, South Africa; Hard – $75,000 – 32S/16D	(Switzerland) Heinz Günthardt; 6–4, 6–4	(United States) Victor Amaya	(Argentina) José Luis Clerc (Brazil) Carlos Kirmayr	(France) Patrick Proisy (South Africa) Deon Joubert (Israel) Shlomo Glickstein (United States) Ferdi Taygan
7 Apr	Johannesburg, South Africa; Hard – $75,000 – 32S/16D	(South Africa) Frew McMillan (South Africa) Bob Hewitt; 6–4, 6–3	(Switzerland) Colin Dowdeswell (Switzerland) Heinz Günthardt	(Argentina) José Luis Clerc (Brazil) Carlos Kirmayr	(France) Patrick Proisy (South Africa) Deon Joubert (Israel) Shlomo Glickstein (United States) Ferdi Taygan
14 Apr	Jack Kramer Open; Los Angeles, US; Hard – $175,000 – 64S/32D	(United States) Gene Mayer; 6–3, 6–2	(United States) Brian Teacher	(United States) Bill Scanlon (United States) Roscoe Tanner	(United States) Stan Smith (France) Yannick Noah (United States) Butch Walts (Czechoslovakia) Ivan Lendl
14 Apr	Jack Kramer Open; Los Angeles, US; Hard – $175,000 – 64S/32D	(United States) Butch Walts (United States) Brian Teacher; 6–2, 6–4	(India) Anand Amritraj (United States) John Austin	(United States) Bill Scanlon (United States) Roscoe Tanner	(United States) Stan Smith (France) Yannick Noah (United States) Butch Walts (Czechoslovakia) Ivan Lendl
21 Apr	Alan King Tennis Classic; Las Vegas, Nevada, US; Hard – $300,000 – 32S/16D	(Sweden) Björn Borg; 6–3, 6–1	(United States) Harold Solomon	(United States) Vitas Gerulaitis (Czechoslovakia) Ivan Lendl	(United States) Victor Amaya (Mexico) Raúl Ramírez (United States) Brian Teacher (United States) John McEnroe
21 Apr	Alan King Tennis Classic; Las Vegas, Nevada, US; Hard – $300,000 – 32S/16D	(United States) Stan Smith (United States) Robert Lutz; 6–2, 7–5	(Poland) Wojciech Fibak (United States) Gene Mayer	(United States) Vitas Gerulaitis (Czechoslovakia) Ivan Lendl	(United States) Victor Amaya (Mexico) Raúl Ramírez (United States) Brian Teacher (United States) John McEnroe
28 Apr	WCT Finals; Dallas, Texas, US; Carpet (i) – $250,000 – 8S; Singles	(United States) Jimmy Connors; 2–6, 7–6, 6–1, 6–2	(United States) John McEnroe	(South Africa) Johan Kriek (Czechoslovakia) Ivan Lendl	(Switzerland) Heinz Günthardt (United States) John Sadri (India) Vijay Amritraj (United States) Bill Scanlon
28 Apr	São Paulo, Brazil; Carpet (i) – $175,000 – 32S/16D	(Poland) Wojciech Fibak; 6–0, 7–6	(United States) Vince Van Patten	(Brazil) Thomaz Koch (South Africa) Bernard Mitton	(Paraguay) Víctor Pecci (New Zealand) Chris Lewis (Brazil) Carlos Kirmayr (South Africa) Byron Bertram
28 Apr	São Paulo, Brazil; Carpet (i) – $175,000 – 32S/16D	(United States) Fritz Buehning (India) Anand Amritraj; 7–6, 6–2	(Australia) David Carter (New Zealand) Chris Lewis	(Brazil) Thomaz Koch (South Africa) Bernard Mitton	(Paraguay) Víctor Pecci (New Zealand) Chris Lewis (Brazil) Carlos Kirmayr (South Africa) Byron Bertram

=== May ===
Week	Tournament	Champions	Runners-up	Semifinalists	Quarterfinalists
5 May	Ambre Solaire Nations Cup; Düsseldorf, West Germany; Clay – $400,000 – 8D	Argentina; 3–0	Italy	Sweden; United States	Czechoslovakia; Spain; Australia; West Germany
12 May	Alitalia Open; Florence, Italy; Clay – $50,000 – 32S/16D	(Italy) Adriano Panatta; 6–2, 2–6, 6–4	(Mexico) Raúl Ramírez	(Italy) Gianni Ocleppo (Australia) Phil Dent	(Argentina) José Luis Clerc (Sweden) Stefan Simonsson (Australia) John Alexander (France) Jean-François Caujolle
12 May	Alitalia Open; Florence, Italy; Clay – $50,000 – 32S/16D	(Mexico) Raúl Ramírez (United States) Gene Mayer; 6–1, 6–4	(Italy) Paolo Bertolucci (Italy) Adriano Panatta	(Italy) Gianni Ocleppo (Australia) Phil Dent	(Argentina) José Luis Clerc (Sweden) Stefan Simonsson (Australia) John Alexander (France) Jean-François Caujolle
12 May	German Open Championships; Hamburg, West Germany; Clay – $200,000 – 64S/32D	(United States) Harold Solomon; 6–7, 6–2, 6–4, 2–6, 6–3	(Argentina) Guillermo Vilas	(Czechoslovakia) Ivan Lendl (United States) Eliot Teltscher	(Ecuador) Andrés Gómez (Hungary) Balázs Taróczy (South Africa) John Yuill (Spain) Manuel Orantes
12 May	German Open Championships; Hamburg, West Germany; Clay – $200,000 – 64S/32D	(Ecuador) Andrés Gómez (Chile) Hans Gildemeister; 6–3, 6–4	(West Germany) Reinhart Probst (West Germany) Max Wünschig	(Czechoslovakia) Ivan Lendl (United States) Eliot Teltscher	(Ecuador) Andrés Gómez (Hungary) Balázs Taróczy (South Africa) John Yuill (Spain) Manuel Orantes
19 May	Italian Open; Rome, Italy; Clay – $200,000 – 64S/32D	(Argentina) Guillermo Vilas; 6–0, 6–4, 6–4	(France) Yannick Noah	(United States) Eliot Teltscher (Czechoslovakia) Tomáš Šmíd	(Mexico) Raúl Ramírez (Czechoslovakia) Ivan Lendl (Italy) Corrado Barazzutti (Spain) Manuel Orantes
19 May	Italian Open; Rome, Italy; Clay – $200,000 – 64S/32D	(Australia) Kim Warwick (Australia) Mark Edmondson; 7–6, 7–6	(Hungary) Balázs Taróczy (United States) Eliot Teltscher	(United States) Eliot Teltscher (Czechoslovakia) Tomáš Šmíd	(Mexico) Raúl Ramírez (Czechoslovakia) Ivan Lendl (Italy) Corrado Barazzutti (Spain) Manuel Orantes
19 May	Bavarian Tennis Championships; Munich, West Germany; Clay – $75,000 – 32S/16D	(West Germany) Rolf Gehring; 6–2, 0–6, 6–2, 6–2	(France) Christophe Freyss	(Sweden) Stefan Simonsson (West Germany) Klaus Eberhard	(Czechoslovakia) Pavel Složil (France) Christophe Roger-Vasselin (United States) Terry Moor (Socialist Federal Republic of Yugoslavia) Željko Franulović
19 May	Bavarian Tennis Championships; Munich, West Germany; Clay – $75,000 – 32S/16D	(Switzerland) Heinz Günthardt (South Africa) Bob Hewitt; 7–6, 6–1	(Australia) David Carter (New Zealand) Chris Lewis	(Sweden) Stefan Simonsson (West Germany) Klaus Eberhard	(Czechoslovakia) Pavel Složil (France) Christophe Roger-Vasselin (United States) Terry Moor (Socialist Federal Republic of Yugoslavia) Željko Franulović
26 May; 2 Jun	French Open; Paris, France; Grand Slam; Clay – $385,000 – 128S/64D/32XD; Singles – Doubles – Mixed doubles	(Sweden) Björn Borg; 6–4, 6–1, 6–2	(United States) Vitas Gerulaitis	(United States) Harold Solomon (United States) Jimmy Connors	(Italy) Corrado Barazzutti (Argentina) Guillermo Vilas (Chile) Hans Gildemeister (Poland) Wojciech Fibak
26 May; 2 Jun	French Open; Paris, France; Grand Slam; Clay – $385,000 – 128S/64D/32XD; Singles – Doubles – Mixed doubles	(United States) Victor Amaya (United States) Hank Pfister; 1–6, 6–4, 6–4, 6–3	(United States) Brian Gottfried (Mexico) Raúl Ramírez	(United States) Harold Solomon (United States) Jimmy Connors	(Italy) Corrado Barazzutti (Argentina) Guillermo Vilas (Chile) Hans Gildemeister (Poland) Wojciech Fibak
26 May; 2 Jun	French Open; Paris, France; Grand Slam; Clay – $385,000 – 128S/64D/32XD; Singles – Doubles – Mixed doubles	(United States) Anne Smith (United States) Billy Martin; 2–6, 6–4, 8–6	(Czechoslovakia) Renáta Tomanová (Czechoslovakia) Stanislav Birner	(United States) Harold Solomon (United States) Jimmy Connors	(Italy) Corrado Barazzutti (Argentina) Guillermo Vilas (Chile) Hans Gildemeister (Poland) Wojciech Fibak

=== June ===
Week	Tournament	Champions	Runners-up	Semifinalists	Quarterfinalists
9 Jun	Belgian International Championships; Brussels, Belgium; Clay – $50,000 – 32S/16D	(Australia) Peter McNamara; 7–6, 6–3, 6–0	(Hungary) Balázs Taróczy	(United States) Eddie Dibbs (Argentina) Gustavo Guerrero	(France) Christophe Freyss (France) Patrice Dominguez (West Germany) Andreas Maurer (Spain) Fernando Luna
9 Jun	Belgian International Championships; Brussels, Belgium; Clay – $50,000 – 32S/16D	(Belgium) Thierry Stevaux (United States) Steve Krulevitz; 6–3, 7–5	(United States) Eric Fromm (United States) Cary Leeds	(United States) Eddie Dibbs (Argentina) Gustavo Guerrero	(France) Christophe Freyss (France) Patrice Dominguez (West Germany) Andreas Maurer (Spain) Fernando Luna
9 Jun	Queen's Club Championships; London, England; Grass – $125,000 – 64S/32D; Singles – Doubles	(United States) John McEnroe; 6–3, 6–1	(Australia) Kim Warwick	(Paraguay) Víctor Pecci (United States) Vitas Gerulaitis	(India) Vijay Amritraj (United States) Roscoe Tanner (United States) Peter Rennert (United States) Stan Smith
9 Jun	Queen's Club Championships; London, England; Grass – $125,000 – 64S/32D; Singles – Doubles	(Australia) Rod Frawley (Australia) Geoff Masters; 6–2, 4–6, 11-9	(Australia) Paul McNamee (United States) Sherwood Stewart	(Paraguay) Víctor Pecci (United States) Vitas Gerulaitis	(India) Vijay Amritraj (United States) Roscoe Tanner (United States) Peter Rennert (United States) Stan Smith
16 Jun	Surbiton, England; Grass – $50,000 – 32S/16D	(United States) Brian Gottfried; 6–3, 6–3	(United States) Sandy Mayer	(New Zealand) Chris Lewis (Austria) Peter Feigl	(Mexico) Raúl Ramírez (United States) Hank Pfister (Australia) Brad Drewett (United States) Bill Scanlon
16 Jun	Surbiton, England; Grass – $50,000 – 32S/16D	(Australia) Kim Warwick (Australia) Mark Edmondson; 7–6, 6–7, 6–7, 7–6, 15-13	(Zimbabwe) Andrew Pattison (United States) Butch Walts	(New Zealand) Chris Lewis (Austria) Peter Feigl	(Mexico) Raúl Ramírez (United States) Hank Pfister (Australia) Brad Drewett (United States) Bill Scanlon
16 Jun	Vienna, Austria; Clay – $50,000 – 32S/16D	(Spain) Ángel Giménez; 1–6, 1–1, ret.	(Czechoslovakia) Tomáš Šmíd	(Australia) Peter McNamara (France) Christophe Roger-Vasselin	(Spain) Fernando Luna (France) Patrick Proisy (Chile) Pedro Rebolledo (Italy) Paolo Bertolucci
16 Jun	Vienna, Austria; Clay – $50,000 – 32S/16D	(France) Christophe Roger-Vasselin (Italy) Gianni Ocleppo; Walkover	(Czechoslovakia) Pavel Složil (Czechoslovakia) Tomáš Šmíd	(Australia) Peter McNamara (France) Christophe Roger-Vasselin	(Spain) Fernando Luna (France) Patrick Proisy (Chile) Pedro Rebolledo (Italy) Paolo Bertolucci
23 Jun; 30 Jun	Wimbledon; London, England; Grand Slam; Grass – $350,000 – 128S/64D/49XD; Singles – Doubles – Mixed doubles	(Sweden) Björn Borg; 1–6, 7–5, 6–3, 6–7^{(16–18)}, 8–6	(United States) John McEnroe	(United States) Brian Gottfried (United States) Jimmy Connors	(United States) Gene Mayer (Poland) Wojciech Fibak (United States) Roscoe Tanner (United States) Peter Fleming
23 Jun; 30 Jun	Wimbledon; London, England; Grand Slam; Grass – $350,000 – 128S/64D/49XD; Singles – Doubles – Mixed doubles	(Australia) Peter McNamara (Australia) Paul McNamee; 7–6^{(7–5)}, 6–3, 6–7^{(4–7)}, 6–4	(United States) Bob Lutz (United States) Stan Smith	(United States) Brian Gottfried (United States) Jimmy Connors	(United States) Gene Mayer (Poland) Wojciech Fibak (United States) Roscoe Tanner (United States) Peter Fleming
23 Jun; 30 Jun	Wimbledon; London, England; Grand Slam; Grass – $350,000 – 128S/64D/49XD; Singles – Doubles – Mixed doubles	(United States) Tracy Austin (United States) John Austin; 4–6, 7–6^{(8–6)}, 6–3	(Australia) Dianne Fromholtz (Australia) Mark Edmondson	(United States) Brian Gottfried (United States) Jimmy Connors	(United States) Gene Mayer (Poland) Wojciech Fibak (United States) Roscoe Tanner (United States) Peter Fleming

=== July ===
Week	Tournament	Champions	Runners-up	Semifinalists	Quarterfinalists
7 Jul	Suisse Open; Gstaad, Switzerland; Clay – $125,000 – 32S/16D	(Switzerland) Heinz Günthardt; 4–6, 6–4, 7–6	(Australia) Kim Warwick	(Hungary) Balázs Taróczy (Brazil) Marcos Hocevar	(New Zealand) Chris Lewis (Australia) Paul McNamee (Australia) Peter McNamara (Israel) Shlomo Glickstein
7 Jul	Suisse Open; Gstaad, Switzerland; Clay – $125,000 – 32S/16D	(Egypt) Ismail El Shafei (Switzerland) Colin Dowdeswell; 6–4, 6–4	(Australia) Mark Edmondson (Australia) Kim Warwick	(Hungary) Balázs Taróczy (Brazil) Marcos Hocevar	(New Zealand) Chris Lewis (Australia) Paul McNamee (Australia) Peter McNamara (Israel) Shlomo Glickstein
7 Jul	Newport, Rhode Island, US; Grass – $100,000 – 32S/16D	(India) Vijay Amritraj; 6–1, 5–7, 6–3	(Zimbabwe) Andrew Pattison	(United States) John Sadri (United States) Nick Saviano	(United States) Butch Walts (United States) Hank Pfister (South Africa) Bernard Mitton (United States) Billy Martin
7 Jul	Newport, Rhode Island, US; Grass – $100,000 – 32S/16D	(United States) Butch Walts (Zimbabwe) Andrew Pattison; 7–6, 6–4	(United States) Fritz Buehning (United States) Peter Rennert	(United States) John Sadri (United States) Nick Saviano	(United States) Butch Walts (United States) Hank Pfister (South Africa) Bernard Mitton (United States) Billy Martin
14 Jul	Swedish Open; Båstad, Sweden; Clay – $75,000 – 32S/16D	(Hungary) Balázs Taróczy; 6–3, 3–6, 7–6	(United States) Tony Giammalva	(Sweden) Birger Andersson (Australia) Paul Kronk	(Sweden) Kjell Johansson (Bolivia) Mario Martínez (Australia) Peter McNamara (Switzerland) Heinz Günthardt
14 Jul	Swedish Open; Båstad, Sweden; Clay – $75,000 – 32S/16D	(Switzerland) Markus Günthardt (Switzerland) Heinz Günthardt; 6–4, 6–4	(United Kingdom) John Feaver (Australia) Peter McNamara	(Sweden) Birger Andersson (Australia) Paul Kronk	(Sweden) Kjell Johansson (Bolivia) Mario Martínez (Australia) Peter McNamara (Switzerland) Heinz Günthardt
14 Jul	U.S. Pro Tennis Championships; Boston, Massachusetts, US; Clay – $175,000 – 64S/32D	(United States) Eddie Dibbs; 6–2, 6–1	(United States) Gene Mayer	(Argentina) José Luis Clerc (Spain) José Higueras	(United States) Jimmy Connors (Chile) Hans Gildemeister (Paraguay) Víctor Pecci (United States) Van Winitsky
14 Jul	U.S. Pro Tennis Championships; Boston, Massachusetts, US; Clay – $175,000 – 64S/32D	(United States) Sandy Mayer (United States) Gene Mayer; 1–6, 6–4, 6–4	(Chile) Hans Gildemeister (Ecuador) Andrés Gómez	(Argentina) José Luis Clerc (Spain) José Higueras	(United States) Jimmy Connors (Chile) Hans Gildemeister (Paraguay) Víctor Pecci (United States) Van Winitsky
14 Jul	Mercedes Cup; Stuttgart, West Germany; Clay – $75,000 – 32S/16D	(United States) Vitas Gerulaitis; 6–2, 7–5, 6–2	(Poland) Wojciech Fibak	(West Germany) Rolf Gehring (Colombia) Jairo Velasco, Sr.	(Romania) Ilie Năstase (West Germany) Ulrich Marten (New Zealand) Christ Lewis (Socialist Federal Republic of Yugoslavia) Željko Franulović
14 Jul	Mercedes Cup; Stuttgart, West Germany; Clay – $75,000 – 32S/16D	(South Africa) Frew McMillan (Switzerland) Colin Dowdeswell; 6–3, 6–4	(New Zealand) Chris Lewis (South Africa) John Yuill	(West Germany) Rolf Gehring (Colombia) Jairo Velasco, Sr.	(Romania) Ilie Năstase (West Germany) Ulrich Marten (New Zealand) Christ Lewis (Socialist Federal Republic of Yugoslavia) Željko Franulović
21 Jul	Dutch Open; Hilversum, Netherlands; Clay – $75,000 – 32S/16D	(Hungary) Balázs Taróczy; 6–3, 6–2, 6–1	(Zimbabwe) Haroon Ismail	(United Kingdom) Buster Mottram (France) Dominique Bedel	(Sweden) Per Hjertquist (Netherlands) Tom Okker (Spain) Ángel Giménez (West Germany) Peter Elter
21 Jul	Dutch Open; Hilversum, Netherlands; Clay – $75,000 – 32S/16D	(Hungary) Balázs Taróczy (Netherlands) Tom Okker; 7–5, 6–3, 7–6	(United States) Tony Giammalva (United Kingdom) Buster Mottram	(United Kingdom) Buster Mottram (France) Dominique Bedel	(Sweden) Per Hjertquist (Netherlands) Tom Okker (Spain) Ángel Giménez (West Germany) Peter Elter
21 Jul	Austrian Open; Kitzbühel, Austria; Clay – $75,000 – 32S/16D	(Argentina) Guillermo Vilas; 6–3, 6–2, 6–2	(Czechoslovakia) Ivan Lendl	(Brazil) Carlos Kirmayr (Australia) Peter McNamara	(New Zealand) Chris Lewis (Romania) Ilie Năstase (Austria) Hans Kary (Czechoslovakia) Pavel Složil
21 Jul	Austrian Open; Kitzbühel, Austria; Clay – $75,000 – 32S/16D	(West Germany) Ulrich Marten (West Germany) Klaus Eberhard; 6–4, 3–6, 6–4	(Brazil) Carlos Kirmayr (New Zealand) Chris Lewis	(Brazil) Carlos Kirmayr (Australia) Peter McNamara	(New Zealand) Chris Lewis (Romania) Ilie Năstase (Austria) Hans Kary (Czechoslovakia) Pavel Složil
21 Jul	Washington Star International; Washington, D.C., US; Clay – $175,000 – 64S/32D	(United States) Brian Gottfried; 7–5, 4–6, 6–4	(Argentina) José Luis Clerc	(Italy) Corrado Barazzutti (United States) Gene Mayer	(France) Pascal Portes (Ecuador) Ricardo Ycaza (Paraguay) Víctor Pecci (Socialist Federal Republic of Yugoslavia) Željko Franulović
21 Jul	Washington Star International; Washington, D.C., US; Clay – $175,000 – 64S/32D	(Ecuador) Andrés Gómez (Chile) Hans Gildemeister; 6–4, 7–5	(United States) Gene Mayer (United States) Sandy Mayer	(Italy) Corrado Barazzutti (United States) Gene Mayer	(France) Pascal Portes (Ecuador) Ricardo Ycaza (Paraguay) Víctor Pecci (Socialist Federal Republic of Yugoslavia) Željko Franulović
28 Jul	Volvo International; North Conway, New Hampshire, US; Clay – $175,000 – 64S/32D; Singles – Doubles	(United States) Jimmy Connors; 6–3, 5–7, 6–1	(United States) Eddie Dibbs	(Czechoslovakia) Ivan Lendl (United States) Harold Solomon	(United States) Pat Du Pré (Poland) Wojciech Fibak (United States) Eliot Teltscher (United States) Terry Moor
28 Jul	Volvo International; North Conway, New Hampshire, US; Clay – $175,000 – 64S/32D; Singles – Doubles	(United States) Brian Gottfried (United States) Jimmy Connors; 7–6, 6–2	(South Africa) Kevin Curren (United States) Steve Denton	(Czechoslovakia) Ivan Lendl (United States) Harold Solomon	(United States) Pat Du Pré (Poland) Wojciech Fibak (United States) Eliot Teltscher (United States) Terry Moor
28 Jul	Mutual Benefit Life Open; South Orange, New Jersey, US; Clay – $75,000 – 32S/16D	(Argentina) José Luis Clerc; 6–3, 6–2	(United States) John McEnroe	(Australia) David Carter (Colombia) Álvaro Betancur	(United States) Van Winitsky (Peru) Fernando Maynetto (United States) Blaine Willenborg (Argentina) Ricardo Cano
28 Jul	Mutual Benefit Life Open; South Orange, New Jersey, US; Clay – $75,000 – 32S/16D	(United States) Bill Maze (United States) John McEnroe; 7–6, 6–4	(United States) Fritz Buehning (United States) Van Winitsky	(Australia) David Carter (Colombia) Álvaro Betancur	(United States) Van Winitsky (Peru) Fernando Maynetto (United States) Blaine Willenborg (Argentina) Ricardo Cano

=== August ===
Week	Tournament	Champions	Runners-up	Semifinalists	Quarterfinalists
4 Aug	National Revenue Tennis Classic; Columbus, Ohio, US; Hard – $75,000 – 32S/16D	(United States) Robert Lutz; 6–4, 6–3	(Australia) Terry Rocavert	(United States) Tom Cain (United States) Brian Gottfried	(United States) Sandy Mayer (Paraguay) Francisco González (United States) Brian Teacher (United States) Trey Waltke
4 Aug	National Revenue Tennis Classic; Columbus, Ohio, US; Hard – $75,000 – 32S/16D	(United States) Sandy Mayer (United States) Brian Gottfried; 6–4, 6–2	(United States) Peter Fleming (United States) Eliot Teltscher	(United States) Tom Cain (United States) Brian Gottfried	(United States) Sandy Mayer (Paraguay) Francisco González (United States) Brian Teacher (United States) Trey Waltke
4 Aug	U.S. Clay Court Championships; Indianapolis, Indiana, US; Clay – $200,000 – 64S/32D; Singles – Doubles	(Argentina) José Luis Clerc; 7–5, 6–3	(United States) Mel Purcell	(Spain) José Higueras (Bolivia) Mario Martínez	(United States) Terry Moor (United States) Eliot Teltscher (United States) Eddie Dibbs (Poland) Wojciech Fibak
4 Aug	U.S. Clay Court Championships; Indianapolis, Indiana, US; Clay – $200,000 – 64S/32D; Singles – Doubles	(United States) Steve Denton (South Africa) Kevin Curren; 3–6, 7–6, 6–4	(Poland) Wojciech Fibak (Czechoslovakia) Ivan Lendl	(Spain) José Higueras (Bolivia) Mario Martínez	(United States) Terry Moor (United States) Eliot Teltscher (United States) Eddie Dibbs (Poland) Wojciech Fibak
11 Aug	Cleveland, Ohio, US; Hard – $75,000 – 32S/16D	(United States) Gene Mayer; 6–2, 6–1	(United States) Victor Amaya	(Argentina) Guillermo Vilas (United Kingdom) Buster Mottram	(United States) Nick Saviano (Italy) Gianni Ocleppo (France) Christophe Roger-Vasselin (United States) Bruce Foxworth
11 Aug	Cleveland, Ohio, US; Hard – $75,000 – 32S/16D	(United States) Victor Amaya (United States) Gene Mayer; 6–4, 6–2 (Note: Doubles event not officially listed by ATP.)	(United States) Fred McNair (India) Sashi Menon	(Argentina) Guillermo Vilas (United Kingdom) Buster Mottram	(United States) Nick Saviano (Italy) Gianni Ocleppo (France) Christophe Roger-Vasselin (United States) Bruce Foxworth
11 Aug	Canadian Open; Toronto, Ontario, Canada; Hard – $175,000 – 64S/32D	(Czechoslovakia) Ivan Lendl; 4–6, 5–4, ret.	(Sweden) Björn Borg	(United States) Sandy Mayer (Australia) Paul Kronk	(United States) John Sadri (United States) Tom Leonard (United States) Brian Teacher (United States) Trey Waltke
11 Aug	Canadian Open; Toronto, Ontario, Canada; Hard – $175,000 – 64S/32D	(United States) Brian Teacher (United States) Bruce Manson; 6–3, 3–6, 6–4	(Switzerland) Heinz Günthardt (United States) Sandy Mayer	(United States) Sandy Mayer (Australia) Paul Kronk	(United States) John Sadri (United States) Tom Leonard (United States) Brian Teacher (United States) Trey Waltke
11 Aug	Stowe Grand Prix; Stowe, Vermont, US; Hard – $75,000 – 32S/16D	(United States) Robert Lutz; 6–3, 6–1	(South Africa) Johan Kriek	(Israel) Shlomo Glickstein (India) Vijay Amritraj	(United States) Ferdi Taygan (South Africa) Bernard Mitton (United States) Vince Van Patten (United States) Roscoe Tanner
11 Aug	Stowe Grand Prix; Stowe, Vermont, US; Hard – $75,000 – 32S/16D	(South Africa) Bernard Mitton (United States) Robert Lutz; 6–4, 6–3	(Romania) Ilie Năstase (United States) Ferdi Taygan	(Israel) Shlomo Glickstein (India) Vijay Amritraj	(United States) Ferdi Taygan (South Africa) Bernard Mitton (United States) Vince Van Patten (United States) Roscoe Tanner
18 Aug	Atlanta, Georgia, US; Hard – $75,000 – 32S/16D	(United States) Eliot Teltscher; 6–2, 6–2	(United States) Terry Moor	(South Africa) Kevin Curren (United Kingdom) Buster Mottram	(United States) Tony Giammalva (United States) Butch Walts (United States) Mel Purcell (United States) Eddie Dibbs
18 Aug	Atlanta, Georgia, US; Hard – $75,000 – 32S/16D	(United States) Butch Walts (United States) Tom Gullikson; 6–7, 7–6, 7–5	(India) Anand Amritraj (United States) John Austin	(South Africa) Kevin Curren (United Kingdom) Buster Mottram	(United States) Tony Giammalva (United States) Butch Walts (United States) Mel Purcell (United States) Eddie Dibbs
18 Aug	ATP Championship; Mason, Ohio, US; Hard – $200,000 – 64S/32D	(United States) Harold Solomon; 7–6, 6–3	(Paraguay) Francisco González	(United States) Jimmy Connors (France) Pascal Portes	(Czechoslovakia) Ivan Lendl (France) Christophe Roger-Vasselin (United States) Roscoe Tanner (India) Vijay Amritraj
18 Aug	ATP Championship; Mason, Ohio, US; Hard – $200,000 – 64S/32D	(United States) Brian Teacher (United States) Bruce Manson; 6–7, 7–5, 6–4	(Poland) Wojciech Fibak (Czechoslovakia) Ivan Lendl	(United States) Jimmy Connors (France) Pascal Portes	(Czechoslovakia) Ivan Lendl (France) Christophe Roger-Vasselin (United States) Roscoe Tanner (India) Vijay Amritraj
25 Aug; 1 Sep	US Open; Flushing Meadow, New York, US; Grand Slam; Hard – $350,000 – 128S/64D/32XD; Singles – Doubles – Mixed doubles	(United States) John McEnroe; 7–6^{(7–4)}, 6–1, 6–7^{(5–7)}, 5–7, 6–4	(Sweden) Björn Borg	(South Africa) Johan Kriek (United States) Jimmy Connors	(United States) Roscoe Tanner (Poland) Wojciech Fibak (United States) Eliot Teltscher (Czechoslovakia) Ivan Lendl
25 Aug; 1 Sep	US Open; Flushing Meadow, New York, US; Grand Slam; Hard – $350,000 – 128S/64D/32XD; Singles – Doubles – Mixed doubles	(United States) Bob Lutz (United States) Stan Smith; 7–6, 3–6, 6–1, 3–6, 6–3	(United States) John McEnroe (United States) Peter Fleming	(South Africa) Johan Kriek (United States) Jimmy Connors	(United States) Roscoe Tanner (Poland) Wojciech Fibak (United States) Eliot Teltscher (Czechoslovakia) Ivan Lendl
25 Aug; 1 Sep	US Open; Flushing Meadow, New York, US; Grand Slam; Hard – $350,000 – 128S/64D/32XD; Singles – Doubles – Mixed doubles	(Australia) Wendy Turnbull (United States) Marty Riessen; 7–5, 6–2	(Netherlands) Betty Stöve (South Africa) Frew McMillan	(South Africa) Johan Kriek (United States) Jimmy Connors	(United States) Roscoe Tanner (Poland) Wojciech Fibak (United States) Eliot Teltscher (Czechoslovakia) Ivan Lendl

=== September ===
Week	Tournament	Champions	Runners-up	Semifinalists	Quarterfinalists
8 Sep	Bournemouth, England; Clay – $50,000 – 32S/16D	(Spain) Ángel Giménez; 3–6, 6–3, 6–3	(Israel) Shlomo Glickstein	(Spain) Roberto Vizcaíno (South Africa) Eddie Edwards	(Sweden) Kjell Johansson (United Kingdom) Jonathan Smith (United Kingdom) Robin Drysdale (United Kingdom) Mark Cox
8 Sep	Bournemouth, England; Clay – $50,000 – 32S/16D	(United States) Craig Edwards (South Africa) Eddie Edwards; 6–3, 6–7, 8–6	(United Kingdom) Andrew Jarrett (United Kingdom) Jonathan Smith	(Spain) Roberto Vizcaíno (South Africa) Eddie Edwards	(Sweden) Kjell Johansson (United Kingdom) Jonathan Smith (United Kingdom) Robin Drysdale (United Kingdom) Mark Cox
8 Sep	Campionati Internazionali di Sicilia; Palermo, Sicily, Italy; Clay – $75,000 – 32S/16D	(Argentina) Guillermo Vilas; 6–4, 6–0, 6–0	(Australia) Paul McNamee	(Italy) Franco Merlone (Italy) Adriano Panatta	(Italy) Gianni Ocleppo (Australia) Phil Dent (Bolivia) Mario Martínez (Italy) Marco Armellini
8 Sep	Campionati Internazionali di Sicilia; Palermo, Sicily, Italy; Clay – $75,000 – 32S/16D	(Ecuador) Ricardo Ycaza (Italy) Gianni Ocleppo; 6–2, 6–2	(Paraguay) Víctor Pecci (Hungary) Balázs Taróczy	(Italy) Franco Merlone (Italy) Adriano Panatta	(Italy) Gianni Ocleppo (Australia) Phil Dent (Bolivia) Mario Martínez (Italy) Marco Armellini
8 Sep	Sawgrass Doubles; Florida, US; Hard – $175,000 – D32	(Mexico) Raúl Ramírez (United States) Brian Gottfried; 7–6, 6–4, 2–6, 7–6	(United States) Robert Lutz (United States) Stan Smith	(Paraguay) González / (South Africa) Moore (United States) Riessen / (United States) Stewart	(Zimbabwe) Pattison / (United States) Walts (United States) Amaya / (United States) Pfister (Poland) Fibak / (Switzerland) Günthardt (South Africa) Curren / (United States) Denton
22 Sep	Bordeaux Open; Bordeaux, France; Clay – $50,000 – 32S/16D; Singles – Doubles	(Bolivia) Mario Martínez; 6–0, 7–5, 7–5	(Italy) Gianni Ocleppo	(Italy) Corrado Barazzutti (Ecuador) Ricardo Ycaza	(New Zealand) Chris Lewis (United States) Tony Giammalva (France) Jérôme Potier (Chile) Hans Gildemeister
22 Sep	Bordeaux Open; Bordeaux, France; Clay – $50,000 – 32S/16D; Singles – Doubles	(France) Gilles Moretton (United Kingdom) John Feaver; 6–3, 6–2	(Italy) Gianni Ocleppo (Ecuador) Ricardo Ycaza	(Italy) Corrado Barazzutti (Ecuador) Ricardo Ycaza	(New Zealand) Chris Lewis (United States) Tony Giammalva (France) Jérôme Potier (Chile) Hans Gildemeister
22 Sep	Geneva Open; Geneva, Switzerland; Clay – $75,000 – 32S/16D; Singles – Doubles	(Hungary) Balázs Taróczy; 6–3, 6–2	(Italy) Adriano Panatta	(West Germany) Wolfgang Popp (Switzerland) Roland Stadler	(United States) Harold Solomon (Socialist Federal Republic of Yugoslavia) Željko Franulović (Switzerland) Heinz Günthardt (United States) Vitas Gerulaitis
22 Sep	Geneva Open; Geneva, Switzerland; Clay – $75,000 – 32S/16D; Singles – Doubles	(Hungary) Balázs Taróczy (Socialist Federal Republic of Yugoslavia) Željko Franulović; 6–4, 4–6, 6–4	(Switzerland) Heinz Günthardt (Switzerland) Markus Günthardt	(West Germany) Wolfgang Popp (Switzerland) Roland Stadler	(United States) Harold Solomon (Socialist Federal Republic of Yugoslavia) Željko Franulović (Switzerland) Heinz Günthardt (United States) Vitas Gerulaitis
22 Sep	Transamerica Open; San Francisco, California, US; Carpet (i) – $175,000 – 48S/24D	(United States) Gene Mayer; 6–2, 2–6, 6–1	(United States) Eliot Teltscher	(South Africa) Johan Kriek (United States) Robert Lutz	(United States) John McEnroe (United States) Brian Gottfried (United States) Vince Van Patten (United States) Tim Mayotte
22 Sep	Transamerica Open; San Francisco, California, US; Carpet (i) – $175,000 – 48S/24D	(United States) John McEnroe (United States) Peter Fleming; 6–1, 6–4	(United States) Gene Mayer (United States) Sandy Mayer	(South Africa) Johan Kriek (United States) Robert Lutz	(United States) John McEnroe (United States) Brian Gottfried (United States) Vince Van Patten (United States) Tim Mayotte
29 Sep	Madrid Grand Prix; Madrid, Spain; Clay – $125,000 – 64S/32D	(Argentina) José Luis Clerc; 6–3, 1–6, 1–6, 6–4, 6–2	(Argentina) Guillermo Vilas	(Chile) Hans Gildemeister (Czechoslovakia) Ivan Lendl	(Bolivia) Mario Martínez (Ecuador) Andrés Gómez (Australia) Ross Case (Hungary) Balázs Taróczy
29 Sep	Madrid Grand Prix; Madrid, Spain; Clay – $125,000 – 64S/32D	(Ecuador) Andrés Gómez (Chile) Hans Gildemeister; 3–6, 6–3, 10–8	(Czechoslovakia) Jan Kodeš (Hungary) Balázs Taróczy	(Chile) Hans Gildemeister (Czechoslovakia) Ivan Lendl	(Bolivia) Mario Martínez (Ecuador) Andrés Gómez (Australia) Ross Case (Hungary) Balázs Taróczy
29 Sep	Island Holidays Classic; Maui, Hawaii, US; Hard – $100,000 – 32S/16D	(United States) Eliot Teltscher; 7–6, 6–3	(United States) Tim Wilkison	(United States) Trey Waltke (United States) Bill Scanlon	(United States) Mel Purcell (South Africa) Bernard Mitton (United States) Sandy Mayer (Poland) Wojciech Fibak
29 Sep	Island Holidays Classic; Maui, Hawaii, US; Hard – $100,000 – 32S/16D	(United States) John McEnroe (United States) Peter Fleming; 7–6, 6–7, 6–2	(United States) Victor Amaya (United States) Hank Pfister	(United States) Trey Waltke (United States) Bill Scanlon	(United States) Mel Purcell (South Africa) Bernard Mitton (United States) Sandy Mayer (Poland) Wojciech Fibak

=== October ===
Week	Tournament	Champions	Runners-up	Semifinalists	Quarterfinalists
6 Oct	Torneo Godó; Barcelona, Spain; Clay – $175,000 – 64S/32D	(Czechoslovakia) Ivan Lendl; 6–4, 5–7, 6–4, 4–6, 6–1	(Argentina) Guillermo Vilas	(Argentina) José Luis Clerc (Italy) Adriano Panatta	(Hungary) Balázs Taróczy (Ecuador) Andrés Gómez (Italy) Corrado Barazzutti (Spain) Gabriel Urpí
6 Oct	Torneo Godó; Barcelona, Spain; Clay – $175,000 – 64S/32D	(Czechoslovakia) Ivan Lendl (United States) Steve Denton; 6–2, 6–7, 6–3	(Czechoslovakia) Pavel Složil (Hungary) Balázs Taróczy	(Argentina) José Luis Clerc (Italy) Adriano Panatta	(Hungary) Balázs Taróczy (Ecuador) Andrés Gómez (Italy) Corrado Barazzutti (Spain) Gabriel Urpí
6 Oct	Robinsons South Pacific Classic; Brisbane, Australia; Grass – $50,000 – 32S/16D; Singles – Doubles	(United States) John McEnroe; 6–3, 6–4	(Australia) Phil Dent	(Australia) Rod Frawley (Australia) Dale Collings	(United States) Chris Delaney (Australia) Mark Edmondson (United States) Richard Meyer (Australia) Tony Roche
6 Oct	Robinsons South Pacific Classic; Brisbane, Australia; Grass – $50,000 – 32S/16D; Singles – Doubles	(United States) John McEnroe (United States) Matt Mitchell; 8–6	(Australia) Phil Dent (Australia) Rod Frawley	(Australia) Rod Frawley (Australia) Dale Collings	(United States) Chris Delaney (Australia) Mark Edmondson (United States) Richard Meyer (Australia) Tony Roche
6 Oct	Tel Aviv Open; Tel Aviv, Israel; Hard – $50,000 – 32S/16D; Singles – Doubles	(United States) Harold Solomon; 6–2, 6–3	(Israel) Shlomo Glickstein	(United States) Sammy Giammalva (Romania) Ilie Năstase	(Australia) David Carter (Netherlands) Tom Okker (New Zealand) Onny Parun (Sweden) Per Hjertquist
6 Oct	Tel Aviv Open; Tel Aviv, Israel; Hard – $50,000 – 32S/16D; Singles – Doubles	(United States) Steve Krulevitz (Sweden) Per Hjertquist; 7–6, 6–3	(United States) Eric Fromm (United States) Cary Leeds	(United States) Sammy Giammalva (Romania) Ilie Năstase	(Australia) David Carter (Netherlands) Tom Okker (New Zealand) Onny Parun (Sweden) Per Hjertquist
13 Oct	European Open Indoor Championships; Basel, Switzerland; Hard (i) – $75,000 – 32S/16D	(Czechoslovakia) Ivan Lendl; 6–3, 6–2, 5–7, 0–6, 6–4	(Sweden) Björn Borg	(Netherlands) Tom Okker (Sweden) Per Hjertquist	(United States) Sammy Giammalva (South Africa) Raymond Moore (United States) Eddie Dibbs (Czechoslovakia) Tomáš Šmíd
13 Oct	European Open Indoor Championships; Basel, Switzerland; Hard (i) – $75,000 – 32S/16D	(United States) Steve Denton (South Africa) Kevin Curren; 6–7, 6–4, 6–4	(South Africa) Bob Hewitt (South Africa) Frew McMillan	(Netherlands) Tom Okker (Sweden) Per Hjertquist	(United States) Sammy Giammalva (South Africa) Raymond Moore (United States) Eddie Dibbs (Czechoslovakia) Tomáš Šmíd
13 Oct	Guangzhou, China; Carpet – $50,000 – 32S/16D	(United States) Jimmy Connors; 6–2, 6–4	(United States) Eliot Teltscher	(United States) Terry Moor (Australia) Brad Drewett	(Australia) Cliff Letcher (United States) Matt Mitchell (Chile) Jaime Fillol (Zimbabwe) Haroon Ismail
13 Oct	Guangzhou, China; Carpet – $50,000 – 32S/16D	(Chile) Jaime Fillol (Australia) Ross Case; 6–2, 7–6	(United States) Andy Kohlberg (United States) Larry Stefanki	(United States) Terry Moor (Australia) Brad Drewett	(Australia) Cliff Letcher (United States) Matt Mitchell (Chile) Jaime Fillol (Zimbabwe) Haroon Ismail
13 Oct	Australian Indoor Championships; Sydney, Australia; Hard (i) – $175,000 – 32S/16D; Singles – Doubles	(United States) John McEnroe; 6–3, 6–4, 7–5	(United States) Vitas Gerulaitis	(South Africa) Johan Kriek (United States) Gene Mayer	(United States) Tim Gullikson (Austria) Peter Feigl (United States) Bill Scanlon (United States) John Sadri
13 Oct	Australian Indoor Championships; Sydney, Australia; Hard (i) – $175,000 – 32S/16D; Singles – Doubles	(United States) John McEnroe (United States) Peter Fleming; 4–6, 6–1, 6–2	(United States) Tim Gullikson (South Africa) Johan Kriek	(South Africa) Johan Kriek (United States) Gene Mayer	(United States) Tim Gullikson (Austria) Peter Feigl (United States) Bill Scanlon (United States) John Sadri
20 Oct	Hortico Melbourne Indoor Championships; Melbourne, Australia; Hard (i) – $125,000 – 32S/16D	(United States) Vitas Gerulaitis; 7–5, 6–3	(Australia) Peter McNamara	(United States) Fritz Buehning (United States) Ferdi Taygan	(Australia) Paul McNamee (South Africa) Johan Kriek (Australia) Kim Warwick (United States) Tim Gullikson
20 Oct	Hortico Melbourne Indoor Championships; Melbourne, Australia; Hard (i) – $125,000 – 32S/16D	(United States) Ferdi Taygan (United States) Fritz Buehning; 6–1, 6–2	(United States) John Sadri (United States) Tim Wilkison	(United States) Fritz Buehning (United States) Ferdi Taygan	(Australia) Paul McNamee (South Africa) Johan Kriek (Australia) Kim Warwick (United States) Tim Gullikson
20 Oct	Japan Open Tennis Championships; Tokyo, Japan; Clay – $125,000 – 64S/32D; Singles	(Czechoslovakia) Ivan Lendl; 3–6, 6–4, 6–0	(United States) Eliot Teltscher	(United States) Mel Purcell (Sweden) Jan Norbäck	(United States) Peter Rennert (United States) Terry Moor (United Kingdom) Buster Mottram (United States) Bruce Manson
20 Oct	Japan Open Tennis Championships; Tokyo, Japan; Clay – $125,000 – 64S/32D; Singles	(Chile) Jaime Fillol (Australia) Ross Case; 6–3, 3–6, 6–4	(United States) Terry Moor (United States) Eliot Teltscher	(United States) Mel Purcell (Sweden) Jan Norbäck	(United States) Peter Rennert (United States) Terry Moor (United Kingdom) Buster Mottram (United States) Bruce Manson
20 Oct	Vienna Indoor; Vienna, Austria; Hard (i) – $100,000 – 64S/32D; Singles – Doubles	(United States) Brian Gottfried; 6–2, 6–4, 6–3	(United States) Trey Waltke	(Hungary) Balázs Taróczy (France) Yannick Noah	(Austria) Hans Kary (Czechoslovakia) Tomáš Šmíd (West Germany) Rolf Gehring (South Africa) Raymond Moore
20 Oct	Vienna Indoor; Vienna, Austria; Hard (i) – $100,000 – 64S/32D; Singles – Doubles	(United States) Stan Smith (United States) Robert Lutz; 6–1, 6–2	(Switzerland) Heinz Günthardt (Czechoslovakia) Pavel Složil	(Hungary) Balázs Taróczy (France) Yannick Noah	(Austria) Hans Kary (Czechoslovakia) Tomáš Šmíd (West Germany) Rolf Gehring (South Africa) Raymond Moore
27 Oct	Lacoste Cup; Cologne, West Germany; Carpet (i) – $75,000 – 32S/16D	(United States) Robert Lutz; 6–4, 6–0	(United States) Nick Saviano	(Czechoslovakia) Tomáš Šmíd (Zimbabwe) Andrew Pattison	(United States) Gene Mayer (United States) Trey Waltke (South Africa) Kevin Curren (United States) John Hayes
27 Oct	Lacoste Cup; Cologne, West Germany; Carpet (i) – $75,000 – 32S/16D	(Zimbabwe) Andrew Pattison (South Africa) Bernard Mitton; 6–4, 6–1	(Czechoslovakia) Jan Kodeš (Czechoslovakia) Tomáš Šmíd	(Czechoslovakia) Tomáš Šmíd (Zimbabwe) Andrew Pattison	(United States) Gene Mayer (United States) Trey Waltke (South Africa) Kevin Curren (United States) John Hayes
27 Oct	Paris Open; Paris, France; Hard (i) – $50,000 – 32S/16D; Singles – Doubles	(United States) Brian Gottfried; 4–6, 6–3, 6–1, 7–6	(Italy) Adriano Panatta	(Australia) Paul Kronk (Spain) José López-Maeso	(United Kingdom) Mark Cox (France) Jean-Louis Haillet (Italy) Paolo Bertolucci (France) Pascal Portes
27 Oct	Paris Open; Paris, France; Hard (i) – $50,000 – 32S/16D; Singles – Doubles	(Italy) Adriano Panatta (Italy) Paolo Bertolucci; 6–4, 6–4	(United States) Brian Gottfried (South Africa) Raymond Moore	(Australia) Paul Kronk (Spain) José López-Maeso	(United Kingdom) Mark Cox (France) Jean-Louis Haillet (Italy) Paolo Bertolucci (France) Pascal Portes
27 Oct	Tokyo Indoor; Tokyo, Japan; Carpet (i) – $300,000 – 32S/16D; Singles – Doubles	(United States) Jimmy Connors; 6–1, 6–2	(United States) Tom Gullikson	(United States) Bill Scanlon (United States) John Sadri	(Sweden) Björn Borg (United States) Victor Amaya (Czechoslovakia) Ivan Lendl (United States) Pat Du Pré
27 Oct	Tokyo Indoor; Tokyo, Japan; Carpet (i) – $300,000 – 32S/16D; Singles – Doubles	(United States) Hank Pfister (United States) Victor Amaya; 6–3, 3–6, 7–6	(United States) Marty Riessen (United States) Sherwood Stewart	(United States) Bill Scanlon (United States) John Sadri	(Sweden) Björn Borg (United States) Victor Amaya (Czechoslovakia) Ivan Lendl (United States) Pat Du Pré

=== November ===
Week	Tournament	Champions	Runners-up	Semifinalists	Quarterfinalists
3 Nov	Seiko Hong Kong Classic; Hong Kong; Hard – $75,000 – 32S/16D	(Czechoslovakia) Ivan Lendl; 5–7, 7–6, 6–3	(United States) Brian Teacher	(Netherlands) Louk Sanders (Chile) Jaime Fillol	(United States) Vince Van Patten (Australia) Peter McNamara (United States) Tom Gullikson (United States) Terry Moor
3 Nov	Seiko Hong Kong Classic; Hong Kong; Hard – $75,000 – 32S/16D	(United States) Ferdi Taygan (United States) Peter Fleming; 7–5, 6–2	(United States) Bruce Manson (United States) Brian Teacher	(Netherlands) Louk Sanders (Chile) Jaime Fillol	(United States) Vince Van Patten (Australia) Peter McNamara (United States) Tom Gullikson (United States) Terry Moor
3 Nov	Quito Grand Prix; Quito, Ecuador; Clay – $50,000 – 32S/16D	(Argentina) José Luis Clerc; 6–4, 1–6, 10–8	(Paraguay) Víctor Pecci	(Brazil) Marcos Hocevar (Ecuador) Andrés Gómez	(United States) Vitas Gerulaitis (Brazil) Carlos Kirmayr (Chile) Hans Gildemeister (Ecuador) Ricardo Ycaza
3 Nov	Quito Grand Prix; Quito, Ecuador; Clay – $50,000 – 32S/16D	(Ecuador) Andrés Gómez (Chile) Hans Gildemeister; 6–3, 1–6, 6–4	(Argentina) José Luis Clerc (Chile) Belus Prajoux	(Brazil) Marcos Hocevar (Ecuador) Andrés Gómez	(United States) Vitas Gerulaitis (Brazil) Carlos Kirmayr (Chile) Hans Gildemeister (Ecuador) Ricardo Ycaza
3 Nov	Stockholm Open; Stockholm, Sweden; Carpet (i) – $200,000 – 32S/16D; Singles – Doubles	(Sweden) Björn Borg; 6–3, 6–4	(United States) John McEnroe	(United States) Gene Mayer (United States) Robert Lutz	(France) Yannick Noah (Israel) Schlomo Glickstein (Sweden) Per Hjertquist (Sweden) Hans Simonsson
3 Nov	Stockholm Open; Stockholm, Sweden; Carpet (i) – $200,000 – 32S/16D; Singles – Doubles	(Australia) Paul McNamee (Switzerland) Heinz Günthardt; 6–7, 6–3, 6–2	(United States) Stan Smith (United States) Robert Lutz	(United States) Gene Mayer (United States) Robert Lutz	(France) Yannick Noah (Israel) Schlomo Glickstein (Sweden) Per Hjertquist (Sweden) Hans Simonsson
10 Nov	Bogotá, Colombia; Clay (i) – $50,000 – 32S/16D	(France) Dominique Bedel; 6–4, 7–6	(Brazil) Carlos Kirmayr	(United States) Chris Mayotte (France) Yannick Noah	(Chile) Álvaro Fillol (Paraguay) Víctor Pecci (Ecuador) Ricardo Ycaza (Brazil) Marcos Hocevar
10 Nov	Bogotá, Colombia; Clay (i) – $50,000 – 32S/16D	(Brazil) Carlos Kirmayr (Chile) Álvaro Fillol; 6–4, 6–3	(Ecuador) Andrés Gómez (Ecuador) Ricardo Ycaza	(United States) Chris Mayotte (France) Yannick Noah	(Chile) Álvaro Fillol (Paraguay) Víctor Pecci (Ecuador) Ricardo Ycaza (Brazil) Marcos Hocevar
10 Nov	Taipei International Championships; Taipei, Taiwan; Carpet (i) – $75,000 – 32S/16D	(Czechoslovakia) Ivan Lendl; 6–7, 6–3, 6–3, 7–6	(United States) Brian Teacher	(United States) John Austin (India) Ramesh Krishnan	(India) Sashi Menon (Australia) Syd Ball (United States) Pat Du Pré (United States) Tim Gullikson
10 Nov	Taipei International Championships; Taipei, Taiwan; Carpet (i) – $75,000 – 32S/16D	(United States) Brian Teacher (United States) Bruce Manson; 6–4, 6–0	(United States) John Austin (United States) Ferdi Taygan	(United States) John Austin (India) Ramesh Krishnan	(India) Sashi Menon (Australia) Syd Ball (United States) Pat Du Pré (United States) Tim Gullikson
10 Nov	Wembley Championships; London, England; Carpet (i) – $175,000 – 32S/16D; Singles – Doubles	(United States) John McEnroe; 6–4, 6–3, 6–3	(United States) Gene Mayer	(United States) Harold Solomon (United States) Stan Smith	(United States) Richard Meyer (Czechoslovakia) Tomáš Šmíd (United States) Butch Walts (Australia) Paul McNamee
10 Nov	Wembley Championships; London, England; Carpet (i) – $175,000 – 32S/16D; Singles – Doubles	(United States) John McEnroe (United States) Peter Fleming; 7–5, 6–3	(United States) Bill Scanlon (United States) Eliot Teltscher	(United States) Harold Solomon (United States) Stan Smith	(United States) Richard Meyer (Czechoslovakia) Tomáš Šmíd (United States) Butch Walts (Australia) Paul McNamee
17 Nov	Bangkok, Thailand; Carpet (i) – $75,000 – 32S/16D	(India) Vijay Amritraj; 6–3, 7–5	(United States) Brian Teacher	(Czechoslovakia) Ivan Lendl (India) Ramesh Krishnan	(United States) Ferdi Taygan (United States) Peter Rennert (United States) Dick Stockton (Australia) Kim Warwick
17 Nov	Bangkok, Thailand; Carpet (i) – $75,000 – 32S/16D	(United States) Ferdi Taygan (United States) Brian Teacher; 7–6, 7–6	(Netherlands) Tom Okker (United States) Dick Stockton	(Czechoslovakia) Ivan Lendl (India) Ramesh Krishnan	(United States) Ferdi Taygan (United States) Peter Rennert (United States) Dick Stockton (Australia) Kim Warwick
17 Nov	Italian Indoor Open; Bologna, Italy; Carpet (i) – $75,000 – 32S/16D	(Czechoslovakia) Tomáš Šmíd; 7–5, 6–2	(Italy) Paolo Bertolucci	(France) Pascal Portes (United States) Richard Meyer	(Sweden) Björn Borg (Italy) Corrado Barazzutti (United States) Jeff Borowiak (Sweden) Jan Norbäck
17 Nov	Italian Indoor Open; Bologna, Italy; Carpet (i) – $75,000 – 32S/16D	(United States) Butch Walts (Hungary) Balázs Taróczy; 2–6, 6–3, 6–0	(United States) Steve Denton (Australia) Paul McNamee	(France) Pascal Portes (United States) Richard Meyer	(Sweden) Björn Borg (Italy) Corrado Barazzutti (United States) Jeff Borowiak (Sweden) Jan Norbäck
17 Nov	South American Championships; Buenos Aires, Argentina; Clay – $175,000 – 32S/16D; Singles	(Argentina) José Luis Clerc; 6–7, 2–6, 7–5, 6–0, 6–3	(West Germany) Rolf Gehring	(Paraguay) Víctor Pecci (Uruguay) José Luis Damiani	(West Germany) Klaus Eberhard (Ecuador) Andrés Gómez (Chile) Hans Gildemeister (Ecuador) Ricardo Ycaza
17 Nov	South American Championships; Buenos Aires, Argentina; Clay – $175,000 – 32S/16D; Singles	(Ecuador) Andrés Gómez (Chile) Hans Gildemeister; 6–4, 7–5 (Note: Doubles event not officially listed by ATP.)	(Spain) Ángel Giménez (Colombia) Jairo Velasco, Sr.	(Paraguay) Víctor Pecci (Uruguay) José Luis Damiani	(West Germany) Klaus Eberhard (Ecuador) Andrés Gómez (Chile) Hans Gildemeister (Ecuador) Ricardo Ycaza
24 Nov	Santiago International Championships; Santiago, Chile; Clay – $50,000 – 32S/16D	(Paraguay) Víctor Pecci; 4–6, 6–4, 6–3	(France) Christophe Freyss	(Ecuador) Andrés Gómez (Bolivia) Mario Martínez	(Chile) Pedro Rebolledo (Brazil) João Soares (Bolivia) Ramiro Benavides (Uruguay) José Luis Damiani
24 Nov	Santiago International Championships; Santiago, Chile; Clay – $50,000 – 32S/16D	(Ecuador) Ricardo Ycaza (Chile) Belus Prajoux; 4–6, 7–6, 6–4	(Brazil) Carlos Kirmayr (Brazil) João Soares	(Ecuador) Andrés Gómez (Bolivia) Mario Martínez	(Chile) Pedro Rebolledo (Brazil) João Soares (Bolivia) Ramiro Benavides (Uruguay) José Luis Damiani
24 Nov	South African Open; Johannesburg, South Africa; Hard – $175,000 – 32S/16D	(Australia) Kim Warwick; 6–2, 6–1, 6–2	(United States) Fritz Buehning	(United States) Robert Lutz (South Africa) Kevin Curren	(Argentina) Guillermo Vilas (Australia) Paul McNamee (Switzerland) Heinz Günthardt (Israel) Shlomo Glickstein
24 Nov	South African Open; Johannesburg, South Africa; Hard – $175,000 – 32S/16D	(United States) Stan Smith (United States) Robert Lutz; 6–7, 6–3, 6–4	(Switzerland) Heinz Günthardt (Australia) Paul McNamee	(United States) Robert Lutz (South Africa) Kevin Curren	(Argentina) Guillermo Vilas (Australia) Paul McNamee (Switzerland) Heinz Günthardt (Israel) Shlomo Glickstein

=== December ===
Week	Tournament	Champions	Runners-up	Semifinalists	Quarterfinalists
15 Dec	New South Wales Open; Sydney, Australia; Grass – $125,000 – 64S/32D	(United States) Fritz Buehning; 6–3, 6–7, 7–6	(United States) Brian Teacher	(Australia) Paul McNamee (New Zealand) Russell Simpson	(Australia) Phil Dent (United States) John Sadri (Israel) Shlomo Glickstein (Australia) Kim Warwick
15 Dec	New South Wales Open; Sydney, Australia; Grass – $125,000 – 64S/32D	(Australia) Peter McNamara (Australia) Paul McNamee; 6–2, 6–4	(United States) Vitas Gerulaitis (United States) Brian Gottfried	(Australia) Paul McNamee (New Zealand) Russell Simpson	(Australia) Phil Dent (United States) John Sadri (Israel) Shlomo Glickstein (Australia) Kim Warwick
15 Dec	Sofia, Bulgaria; Carpet (i) – $75,000 – 32S/16D	(Sweden) Per Hjertquist; 6–3, 6–2, 7–5	(Soviet Union) Vadim Borisov	(Soviet Union) Konstantin Pugaev (Netherlands) Louk Sanders	(West Germany) Damir Keretić (Sweden) Tenny Svensson (Switzerland) Roland Stadler (Romania) Andrei Dîrzu
15 Dec	Sofia, Bulgaria; Carpet (i) – $75,000 – 32S/16D	(Austria) Robert Reininger (West Germany) Hartmut Kirchhübel; 4–6, 6–3, 6–4	(Soviet Union) Vadim Borisov (East Germany) Thomas Emmrich	(Soviet Union) Konstantin Pugaev (Netherlands) Louk Sanders	(West Germany) Damir Keretić (Sweden) Tenny Svensson (Switzerland) Roland Stadler (Romania) Andrei Dîrzu
22 Dec; 29 Dec	Australian Open; Melbourne, Australia; Grand Slam; Grass – $350,000 – 64S/32D; Singles – Doubles	(United States) Brian Teacher; 7–5, 7–6^{(7–4)}, 6–2	(Australia) Kim Warwick	(Argentina) Guillermo Vilas (Australia) Peter McNamara	(United States) John Sadri (United States) Bill Scanlon (Australia) Paul McNamee (United States) Peter Rennert
22 Dec; 29 Dec	Australian Open; Melbourne, Australia; Grand Slam; Grass – $350,000 – 64S/32D; Singles – Doubles	(Australia) Mark Edmondson (Australia) Kim Warwick; 7–5, 6–4	(Australia) Peter McNamara (Australia) Paul McNamee	(Argentina) Guillermo Vilas (Australia) Peter McNamara	(United States) John Sadri (United States) Bill Scanlon (Australia) Paul McNamee (United States) Peter Rennert

=== January 1981 ===
Week	Tournament	Champions	Runners-up	Semifinalists	Quarterfinalists
14 Jan	Volvo Masters; New York, US; Carpet (i) – $400,000 – 8S/4D; Singles – Doubles	(Sweden) Björn Borg; 6–4, 6–2, 6–2	(Czechoslovakia) Ivan Lendl	(United States) Gene Mayer (United States) Jimmy Connors	Round Robin (Argentina) José Luis Clerc (United States) John McEnroe (Argentina) Guillermo Vilas (United States) Harold Solomon
14 Jan	Volvo Masters; New York, US; Carpet (i) – $400,000 – 8S/4D; Singles – Doubles	(United States) John McEnroe (United States) Peter Fleming; 6–4, 6–3	(Australia) Peter McNamara (Australia) Paul McNamee	(United States) Gene Mayer (United States) Jimmy Connors	Round Robin (Argentina) José Luis Clerc (United States) John McEnroe (Argentina) Guillermo Vilas (United States) Harold Solomon

== Standings ==
The 1980 Grand Prix tournaments were divided in 12 separate point categories, ranging from the Grand Slam tournaments (350 points for the winner) to the smallest Regular Series tournaments (50 points for the winner). At the end of the year the top-ranked players received a bonus from a $750,000 bonus pool. To qualify for a bonus a player must have participated in at least three Grand Prix tournaments with a prize money of $175,000 or more as well as three tournaments with prize money of $50,000–$75,000 during weeks when a $75,000 event is scheduled.

Rk	Name	Points	Bonus
1	John McEnroe (USA)	2,342	$300,000
2	Ivan Lendl (TCH)	2,110	$200,000
3	Jimmy Connors (USA)	1,981	$150,000
4	Björn Borg (SWE)	1,954	$100,000
5	Gene Mayer (USA)	1,643	$80,000
6	Harold Solomon (USA)	1,509	$60,000
7	Guillermo Vilas (ARG)	1,457	$50,000
8	José Luis Clerc (ARG)	1,349	$40,000
9	Eliot Teltscher (USA)	1,279	$35,000
10	Brian Teacher (USA)	1,208	$30,000

== ATP rankings ==
As of January 1980
Rk	Name	Nation
1	Björn Borg	SWE
2	Jimmy Connors	USA
3	John McEnroe	USA
4	Vitas Gerulaitis	USA
5	Roscoe Tanner	USA
6	Guillermo Vilas	ARG
7	Arthur Ashe	USA
8	Harold Solomon	USA
9	José Higueras	ESP
10	Eddie Dibbs	USA
11	Víctor Pecci	PAR
12	Gene Mayer	USA
13	Peter Fleming	USA
14	Hans Gildemeister	CHI
15	Wojciech Fibak	POL
16	José Luis Clerc	ARG
17	Brian Gottfried	USA
18	Pat Du Pré	USA
19	Manuel Orantes	ESP
20	Ivan Lendl	TCH

Year-end rankings 1980 (4 January 1981)
Rk	Name	Nation	Avg Points	Points	Tourn. #	Change
1	Björn Borg	SWE	106.75	1281	11	=
2	John McEnroe	USA	84.56	1522	18	▲ +1
3	Jimmy Connors	USA	72.44	1304	18	▼ -1
4	Gene Mayer	USA	58.16	1105	19	▲ +8
5	Guillermo Vilas	ARG	53.94	971	18	▲ +1
6	Ivan Lendl	TCH	46.52	1442	31	▲ +14
7	Harold Solomon	USA	44.43	1022	23	▲ +1
8	José Luis Clerc	ARG	36.67	880	24	▲ +8
9	Vitas Gerulaitis	USA	34.60	692	20	▼ –5
10	Eliot Teltscher	USA	34.12	887	26	▲ +17
11	Brian Gottfried	USA	32.81	853	26	▲ +17
12	Brian Teacher	USA	32.69	850	26	▲ +49
13	Eddie Dibbs	USA	31.89	606	19	▼ –3
14	Roscoe Tanner	USA	29.56	473	16	▼ –9
15	Wojciech Fibak	POL	27.64	691	25	=
16	John Sadri	USA	24.17	556	23	▲ +14
17	Victor Amaya	USA	23.91	526	22	▲ +6
18	Johan Kriek	RSA	23.88	573	24	▲ +17
19	Balázs Taróczy	HUN	23.39	421	18	▲ +26
20	Vijay Amritraj	IND	23.29	489	21	▲ +14

*The official ATP year-end rankings were listed from January 4th, 1981.

== List of tournament winners ==
The list of winners and number of singles titles won, alphabetically by last name:

- (Paraguay) Victor Amaya (1) Washington-2
- (India) Vijay Amritraj (2) Newport, Bangkok
- (Italy) Corrado Barazzutti (1) Cairo
- (France) Dominique Bedel (1) Bogotá
- (Sweden) Björn Borg (8) Boca Raton, WCT Invitational, Nice, Monte Carlo, Las Vegas, French Open, Wimbledon, Stockholm
- (United States) Fritz Buehning (1) Sydney Outdoor
- (Argentina) José Luis Clerc (6) Costa Rica, South Orange, Indianapolis, Madrid, Quito, Buenos Aires
- (United States) Jimmy Connors (6) Birmingham, Philadelphia, Dallas, North Conway, Taiwan, Tokyo Indoor
- (United States) Eddie Dibbs (2) Sarasota, Boston
- (South Africa) Colin Dibley (1) Perth
- (Austria) Peter Feigl (1) Nigeria
- (Poland) Wojciech Fibak (3) Dayton, New Orleans, São Paulo
- (West Germany) Rolf Gehring (1) Munich
- (United States) Vitas Gerulaitis (3) Forest Hills, Stuttgart Outdoor, Melbourne Indoor
- (Spain) Ángel Giménez (2) Vienna, Bournemouth
- (Israel) Shlomo Glickstein (1) Hobart
- (United States) Brian Gottfried (4) Surbiton, Washington, D.C., Vienna, Paris Indoor
- (Switzerland) Heinz Günthardt (3) Rotterdam, Johannesburg, Gstaad
- (Sweden) Per Hjertquist (1) Sofia
- (Czechoslovakia) Ivan Lendl (7) Houston, Toronto, Barcelona, Basel, Tokyo Outdoor, Hong Kong, Taiwan
- (United States) Robert Lutz (3) Columbus, Stowe, Cologne
- (Bolivia) Mario Martínez (1) Bordeaux
- (United States) Gene Mayer (5) Denver, Metz, Los Angeles, Cleveland, San Francisco
- (United States) John McEnroe (9) Richmond WCT, Memphis, Milan, Queen's Club, US Open, Brisbane, Sydney Indoor, Wembley, WCT Challenge Cup
- (Australia) Peter McNamara (1) Brussels
- (Australia) Paul McNamee (1) Palm Harbor
- (Italy) Adriano Panatta (1) Florence
- (Paraguay) Víctor Pecci (1) Santiago
- (Mexico) Raúl Ramírez (1) Puerto Rico
- (United States) John Sadri (1) Auckland
- (United States) Howard Schoenfield (1) Tulsa
- (Czechoslovakia) Tomáš Šmíd (2) Stuttgart Indoor, Bologna
- (United States) Stan Smith (1) Frankfurt
- (United States) Harold Solomon (4) Baltimore WCT, Hamburg, Cincinnati, Tel Aviv
- (Hungary) Balázs Taróczy (3) Båstad, Hilversum, Geneva
- (United States) Brian Teacher (1) Australian Open
- (United States) Eliot Teltscher (2) Atlanta, Maui
- (Argentina) Guillermo Vilas (3) Rome, Kitzbühel, Palermo
- (Australia) Kim Warwick (1) Johannesburg

The following players won their first title in 1980:

- (France) Dominique Bedel Bogotá
- (Sweden) Per Hjertquist Sofia
- (Czechoslovakia) Ivan Lendl Houston
- (Australia) Paul McNamee Palm Harbor

== See also ==
- World Championship Tennis
- 1980 WTA Tour
