= 1980 Bank of Oklahoma Classic =

- Date: April 7–12
- Edition: 3rd
- Category: Grand Prix
- Draw: 32S / 16D
- Prize money: $50,000
- Surface: Hard / outdoor
- Location: Tulsa, Oklahoma, U.S.
- Venue: Shadow Mountain Racquet Club

Champions

Singles
- (United States) Howard Schoenfield

Doubles
- (United States) Bob Lutz / (United States) Dick Stockton
← 1979 ·	Tulsa Grand Prix Tennis Tournament

The 1980 Bank of Oklahoma Classic was a men's tennis tournament played on outdoor hard courts at the Shadow Mountain Racquet Club in Tulsa, Oklahoma in the United States that was part of the 1980 Volvo Grand Prix circuit. It was the third and last edition of the tournament was held from April 7 through April 12, 1980. Unseeded Howard Schoenfield won the singles title and earned $8,750 first-prize money.

== Finals ==
=== Singles ===
(United States) Howard Schoenfield defeated (United States) Trey Waltke 5–7, 6–1, 6–0

- It was Schoenfield's only singles title of his career.

=== Doubles ===
(United States) Bob Lutz / (United States) Dick Stockton defeated (Paraguay) Francisco González / (United States) Van Winitsky 2–6, 7–6, 6–2
