= 1980 Mutual Benefit Life Open =

- Date: July 28 – August 4
- Edition: 11th
- Category: Grand Prix
- Draw: 32S / 16D
- Prize money: $75,000
- Surface: Clay / outdoor
- Location: South Orange, New Jersey, US
- Venue: Orange Lawn Tennis Club

Champions

Singles
- (Argentina) José Luis Clerc

Doubles
- (United States) Bill Maze / (United States) John McEnroe
- South Orange Open

The 1980 Mutual Benefit Life Open, also known as the South Orange Open, was a men's tennis tournament played on outdoor clay courts at the Orange Lawn Tennis Club in South Orange, New Jersey in the United States. The event was part of the 1980 Grand Prix circuit. It was the 11th edition of the tournament and was held from July 28 through August 4, 1980. Second-seeded José Luis Clerc won the singles title and earned $15,000 first-prize money.

== Finals ==
=== Singles ===
(Argentina) José Luis Clerc defeated (United States) John McEnroe 6–3, 6–2

- It was Clerc's 2nd singles title of the year and the 6th of his career.

=== Doubles ===
(United States) Bill Maze / (United States) John McEnroe defeated (United States) Fritz Buehning / (United States) Van Winitsky 7–6, 6–4
