= 1980 Friendship Tournament =

- Date: 10–16 March
- Edition: 2nd
- Category: Grand Prix
- Draw: 32S / 16D
- Prize money: $50,000
- Surface: Hard / outdoor
- Location: San José, Costa Rica

Champions

Singles
- (Argentina) José Luis Clerc

Doubles
- (Chile) Álvaro Fillol / (Chile) Jaime Fillol
- Friendship Cup

The 1980 Friendship Tournament was a men's tennis tournament played on outdoor hardcourts in San José, Costa Rica that was part of the 1980 Volvo Grand Prix. It was the second and last edition of the tournament and was held from 10 March through 16 March 1980. Second-seeded José Luis Clerc won the singles title.

== Finals ==
=== Singles ===
(Argentina) José Luis Clerc defeated (United States) Jimmy Connors 4–6, 2–6, ret.

- It was Clerc's 1st singles title of the year and the 5th and last of his career.

=== Doubles ===
(Chile) Álvaro Fillol / (Chile) Jaime Fillol defeated (India) Anand Amritraj / (United States) Nick Saviano 6–2, 7–6

- It was Álvaro Fillol's 1st doubles title of the year and the 4th of his career. It was Jaime Fillol's 1st doubles title of the year and the 12th of his career.
