= 1980 Quito Grand Prix =

Tennis tournament

- Date: 3–9 November
- Edition: 2nd
- Category: Grand Prix
- Draw: 32S / 16D
- Prize money: $50,000
- Surface: Clay / outdoor
- Location: Quito, Ecuador

Champions

Singles
- (Argentina) José Luis Clerc

Doubles
- (Ecuador) Andrés Gómez (Chile) Hans Gildemeister
- Quito Open

The 1980 Quito Grand Prix, also known as the Grand Prix Ciudad de Quito, was a men's tennis tournament played on outdoor clay courts in Quito, Ecuador that was part of the Grand Prix tennis circuit. It was the second edition of the tournament and was held from 3 November until 9 November 1980. Second-seeded José Luis Clerc won the singles title.

== Finals ==
=== Singles ===
(Argentina) José Luis Clerc defeated (Paraguay) Víctor Pecci 6–4, 1–6, 10–8

- It was Clerc's 5th singles title of the year and the 9th of his career.

=== Doubles ===
(Ecuador) Andrés Gómez / (Chile) Hans Gildemeister defeated (Argentina) José Luis Clerc / (Chile) Belus Prajoux 6–3, 1–6, 6–4
