= 1980 Madrid Grand Prix =

- Date: 29 September – 5 October
- Edition: 9th
- Category: Grand Prix
- Draw: 32S / 16D
- Prize money: $125,000
- Surface: Clay / outdoor
- Location: Madrid, Spain
- Venue: Real Sociedad Hípica Española Club de Campo

Champions

Singles
- (Argentina) José Luis Clerc

Doubles
- (Ecuador) Andrés Gómez / (Chile) Hans Gildemeister
- Madrid Tennis Grand Prix

The 1980 Madrid Grand Prix was a men's tennis tournament played on outdoor clay courts that was part of the 1980 Volvo Grand Prix tennis circuit. It was the ninth edition of the tournament and was held at the Real Sociedad Hípica Española Club de Campo in Madrid, Spain from 29 September until 5 October 1980. Third-seeded José Luis Clerc won the singles title.

== Finals ==
=== Singles ===
(Argentina) José Luis Clerc defeated (Argentina) Guillermo Vilas 6–3, 1–6, 1–6, 6–4, 6–2

- It was Clerc's 4th singles title of the year and the 8th of his career.

=== Doubles ===
(Ecuador) Andrés Gómez / (Chile) Hans Gildemeister defeated (Czechoslovakia) Jan Kodeš / (Hungary) Balázs Taróczy 3–6, 6–3, 10–8

- It was Gómez' 4th doubles title of the year and of his career. It was Gildemeister's 2nd doubles title of the year and the 6th of his career.
