= 1980 Volvo Tennis Classic =

- Date: March 3–9
- Edition: 9th
- Category: Grand Prix
- Draw: 32S / 16D
- Prize money: $125,000
- Surface: Carpet / indoor
- Location: Washington, D.C., United States
- Venue: Charles E. Smith Center

Champions

Singles
- (United States) Victor Amaya

Doubles
- (United States) Brian Teacher / (United States) Ferdi Taygan
- Washington Indoor

The 1980 Volvo Tennis Classic, also known as the Washington Indoor, was a men's tennis tournament played on indoor carpet courts at the Charles E. Smith Center in Washington, D.C. in the United States that was part of the 1980 Grand Prix circuit. It was the ninth and last edition of the tournament and was held from March 3 through March 9, 1980. Sixth-seeded Victor Amaya won the singles title and earned $21,875 first-prize money after defeating seventh-seeded Ivan Lendl in the final.

== Finals ==
=== Singles ===
(United States) Victor Amaya defeated (Czechoslovakia) Ivan Lendl 6–7^{(5–7)}, 6–4, 7–5

- It was Amaya's only singles title of the year and the 3rd and last of his career.

=== Doubles ===
(United States) Brian Teacher / (United States) Ferdi Taygan defeated (South Africa) Kevin Curren / (United States) Steve Denton 4–6, 6–3, 7–6

== See also ==
- 1980 Washington Star International
