= 1980 Transamerica Open =

- Date: September 22–28
- Edition: 92nd
- Category: Grand Prix (Super Series)
- Draw: 48S / 24D
- Prize money: $175,000
- Surface: Carpet / indoor
- Location: San Francisco, California, U.S.
- Venue: Cow Palace

Champions

Singles
- (United States) Gene Mayer

Doubles
- (United States) John McEnroe / (United States) Peter Fleming
- Pacific Coast Championships

The 1980 Transamerica Open, also known as the Pacific Coast Championships, was a men's tennis tournament played on indoor carpet courts at the Cow Palace in San Francisco, California in the United States. The event was part of the Super Series of the 1980 Volvo Grand Prix circuit. It was the 92nd edition of the tournament and was held from September 22 through September 28, 1980. Third-seeded Gene Mayer won the singles title and earned $27,500 first-prize money.

== Finals ==
=== Singles ===
(United States) Gene Mayer defeated (United States) Eliot Teltscher 6–2, 2–6, 6–1

- It was Mayer's 5th singles title of the year and the 7th of his career.

=== Doubles ===
(United States) John McEnroe / (United States) Peter Fleming defeated (United States) Gene Mayer / (United States) Sandy Mayer 6–1, 6–4
