= 1980 Dutch Open (tennis) =

- Date: 21–27 July
- Edition: 23rd
- Category: Grand Prix
- Draw: 32S / 16D
- Prize money: $75,000
- Surface: Clay / outdoor
- Location: Hilversum, Netherlands
- Venue: 't Melkhuisje

Champions

Singles
- (Hungary) Balázs Taróczy

Doubles
- (Netherlands) Tom Okker / (Hungary) Balázs Taróczy
- Dutch Open

The 1980 Dutch Open was a Grand Prix tennis tournament staged in Hilversum, Netherlands. The tournament was played on outdoor clay courts and was held from 21 July until 27 July 1980. It was the 23rd edition of the tournament. Balázs Taróczy won his third consecutive singles title at the event and fourth in total.

== Finals ==
=== Singles ===
(Hungary) Balázs Taróczy defeated (Zimbabwe) Haroon Ismail 6–3, 6–2, 6–1

=== Doubles ===
(Netherlands) Tom Okker / (Hungary) Balázs Taróczy defeated (United States) Tony Giammalva / (United Kingdom) Buster Mottram 7–5, 6–3, 7–6
