= 1980 Alitalia Open =

- Date: 12–18 May
- Edition: 8th
- Category: Grand Prix
- Draw: 32S / 16D
- Prize money: $50,000
- Surface: Clay / outdoor
- Location: Florence, Italy

Champions

Singles
- (Italy) Adriano Panatta

Doubles
- (United States) Gene Mayer / (Italy) Adriano Panatta
- ATP Florence

The 1980 Alitalia Open was a men's tennis tournament played on outdoor clay courts in Florence, Italy that was part of the 1980 Volvo Grand Prix circuit. It was the eighth edition of the tournament and was played from 12 May until 18 May 1980. Sixth-seeded Adriano Panatta won the singles title.

== Finals ==
=== Singles ===
(Italy) Adriano Panatta defeated (Mexico) Raúl Ramírez 6–2, 2–6, 6–4

- It was Panatta's 1st singles title of the year and the 10th and last of his career.

=== Doubles ===
(United States) Gene Mayer / (Mexico) Raúl Ramírez defeated (Italy) Paolo Bertolucci / (Italy) Adriano Panatta 6–1, 6–4
