= 1980 Baltimore International =

- Date: January 14–20
- Edition: 9th
- Category: Grand Prix
- Draw: 32S / 16D
- Prize money: $75,000
- Surface: Carpet / indoor
- Location: Baltimore, MD, U.S.
- Venue: Towson State College

Champions

Singles
- (United States) Harold Solomon

Doubles
- (United States) Marty Riessen / (United States) Tim Gullikson
- Baltimore International

The 1980 Baltimore International, also known by its sponsored name First National Classic, was a men's tennis tournament played on indoor carpet courts at the Towson State College in Baltimore, Maryland in the United States that was part of the 1980 Grand Prix circuit. It was the ninth edition of the event and was held from January 14 through January 20, 1980. First-seeded Harold Solomon won his second consecutive singles title at the event.

== Finals ==
=== Singles ===
(United States) Harold Solomon defeated (United States) Tim Gullikson 7–6, 6–0

- It was Solomon's 1st singles title of the year and the 19th of his career.

=== Doubles ===
(United States) Marty Riessen / (United States) Tim Gullikson defeated (United States) Brian Gottfried / (South Africa) Frew McMillan 2–6, 6–3, 6–4
