= 1980 Washington Star International =

- Date: July 21–27
- Edition: 12th
- Category: Grand Prix
- Draw: 64S / 32D
- Prize money: $175,000
- Surface: Clay / outdoor
- Location: Washington, D.C., United States
- Venue: Rock Creek Park

Champions

Singles
- (United States) Brian Gottfried

Doubles
- (Chile) Hans Gildemeister / (Ecuador) Andrés Gómez
- Washington Open

The 1980 Washington Star International was a men's tennis tournament played on outdoor Har-Tru clay courts. The event was part of the 1980 Grand Prix circuit. It was the 12th edition of the tournament and was held at Rock Creek Park in Washington, D.C. in the United States from July 21 through July 27, 1980. Sixth-seeded Brian Gottfried won the singles title and earned $24,500 first-prize money.

== Finals ==
=== Singles ===
(United States) Brian Gottfried defeated (Argentina) José Luis Clerc 7–5, 4–6, 6–4

- It was Gottfried's 2nd singles title of the year and the 19th of his career.

=== Doubles ===
(Chile) Hans Gildemeister / (Ecuador) Andrés Gómez defeated (United States) Gene Mayer / (United States) Sandy Mayer 6–4, 7–5
