= 1980 United Virginia Bank Classic =

- Date: January 28 – February 3
- Edition: 15th
- Category: Grand Prix (WCT)
- Draw: 32S / 16D
- Prize money: $175,000
- Surface: Carpet / indoor
- Location: Richmond, Virginia, United States
- Venue: Richmond Coliseum

Champions

Singles
- (United States) John McEnroe

Doubles
- (United States) Fritz Buehning / (South Africa) Johan Kriek
- Richmond WCT

The 1980 United Virginia Bank Classic, also known as the Richmond WCT, was a men's tennis tournament played on indoor carpet courts at the Richmond Coliseum in Richmond, Virginia, United States. The event was part of World Championship Tennis category of the 1980 Volvo Grand Prix circuit. It was the 15th edition of the tournament and was held from January 28 through February 3, 1980. First-seeded John McEnroe won the singles title and the $30,200 first-prize money.

== Finals ==
=== Singles ===
(United States) John McEnroe defeated (United States) Roscoe Tanner 6–1, 6–2

- It was McEnroe's 1st singles title of the year and the 16th of his career.

=== Doubles ===
(United States) Fritz Buehning / (South Africa) Johan Kriek defeated (United States) Brian Gottfried / (South Africa) Frew McMillan 3–6, 6–3, 7–6^{(7–3)}
