= 1980 Robinson's Tennis Open =

- Date: March 31–April 6
- Edition: 1st
- Category: Grand Prix
- Draw: 32S / 16D
- Prize money: $50,000
- Surface: Hard / outdoor
- Location: Palm Harbor, Florida, U.S.
- Venue: East Lake Woodlands Golf and Racquet Club

Champions

Singles
- (Australia) Paul McNamee

Doubles
- (Australia) Paul Kronk / (Australia) Paul McNamee
- Tampa Open

The 1980 Robinson's Tennis Open, also known as the Tampa Open, was a men's tennis tournament played on outdoor hard courts at the East Lake Woodlands Golf and Racquet Club in Palm Harbor, Florida in the United States that was part of the 1980 Grand Prix circuit. It was the second edition of the tournament and took place from March 31 through April 6, 1980. Fifth-seeded Paul McNamee won the singles title and earned $12,000 first-prize money.

== Finals ==
=== Singles ===
(Australia) Paul McNamee defeated (United States) Stan Smith 6–4, 6–3

- It was McNamee's 1st singles title of his career.

=== Doubles ===
(Australia) Paul Kronk / (Australia) Paul McNamee defeated (Australia) Steve Docherty / (Australia) John James 6–4, 7–5

- It was Kronk' 2nd and last doubles title of the year and the 2nd of his career. It was McNamee's 2nd doubles title of the year and the 7th of his career.
