= 1979 Bank of Oklahoma Classic =

- Date: April 9–15
- Edition: 2nd
- Category: Grand Prix
- Draw: 32S / 16D
- Prize money: $50,000
- Surface: Hard / outdoor
- Location: Tulsa, Oklahoma, U.S.
- Venue: Shadow Mountain Racquet Club

Champions

Singles
- (United States) Jimmy Connors

Doubles
- (United States) Eliot Teltscher / (Paraguay) Francisco González
- Tulsa Grand Prix Tennis Tournament

The 1979 Bank of Oklahoma Classic was a men's tennis tournament played on outdoor hard courts at the Shadow Mountain Racquet Club in Tulsa, Oklahoma in the United States that was part of the 1979 Colgate-Palmolive Grand Prix. It was the second edition of the tournament was held from April 9 through April 15, 1979. First-seeded Jimmy Connors won the singles title and earned $8,750 first-prize money.

== Finals ==
=== Singles ===
(United States) Jimmy Connors defeated (United States) Eddie Dibbs 6–7, 7–5, 6–1

- It was Connors' 4th singles title of the year and the 75th of his career.

=== Doubles ===
(United States) Eliot Teltscher / (Paraguay) Francisco González defeated (Australia) Colin Dibley / (United States) Tom Gullikson 6–7, 7–5, 6–3
