= 1980 South African Open (tennis) =

- Date: 25 November – 1 December
- Edition: 77th
- Category: Grand Prix
- Draw: 32S / 16D
- Prize money: $175,000
- Surface: Hard / outdoor
- Location: Johannesburg, South Africa
- Venue: Ellis Park Tennis Stadium

Champions

Singles
- (New Zealand) Kim Warwick

Doubles
- (United States) Bob Lutz / (United States) Stan Smith
- South African Open

The 1980 South African Open was a men's tennis tournament played on outdoor hard courts in Johannesburg, South Africa that was part of the 1980 Volvo Grand Prix. It was the 77th edition of the tournament and was held from 25 November through 1 December 1980. Seventh-seeded Kim Warwick won the singles title.

== Finals ==
=== Singles ===
(New Zealand) Kim Warwick defeated (United States) Fritz Buehning 6–2, 6–1, 6–2

=== Doubles ===
(United States) Bob Lutz / (United States) Stan Smith defeated (Switzerland) Heinz Günthardt / (Australia) Paul McNamee 6–7, 6–3, 6–4
