= 1980 Hortico Melbourne Indoor Championships =

Men's tennis tournament of 1980, Melbourne Indoor

- Date: 20–26 October
- Edition: 1st
- Category: Grand Prix
- Draw: 32S / 16D
- Prize money: $125,000
- Surface: Carpet / indoor
- Location: Melbourne, Victoria, Australia

Champions

Singles
- (United States) Vitas Gerulaitis

Doubles
- (United States) Fritz Buehning / (United States) Ferdi Taygan
- Melbourne Indoor

The 1980 Hortico Melbourne Indoor Championships was an Association of Tennis Professionals men's tournament played on indoor carpet courts in the Frankston suburb of Melbourne, Victoria, Australia. It was the inaugural edition of the tournament, which was part of the 1980 Grand Prix tennis circuit, and was held from 20 October until 26 October 1980. First-seeded Vitas Gerulaitis won the singles title.

== Finals ==
=== Singles ===
(United States) Vitas Gerulaitis defeated (Australia) Peter McNamara 7–5, 6–3

- It was Gerulaitis's 3rd singles title of the year and the 18th of his career.

=== Doubles ===
(United States) Fritz Buehning / (United States) Ferdi Taygan defeated (United States) John Sadri / (United States) Tim Wilkison 6–1, 6–2
