= 1980 Gulf States Tennis Classic =

Tennis tournament

- Date: March 31 – April 6
- Edition: 3rd
- Category: Grand Prix
- Draw: 32S / 16D
- Prize money: $75,000
- Surface: Carpet / indoor
- Location: New Orleans, Louisiana, U.S.
- Venue: New Orleans Municipal Auditorium

Champions

Singles
- (Poland) Wojciech Fibak

Doubles
- (United States) Terry Moor / (United States) Eliot Teltscher
- New Orleans Grand Prix

The 1980 Gulf States Tennis Classic was a men's tennis tournament played on indoor carpet courts at the New Orleans Municipal Auditorium in New Orleans, Louisiana in the United States that was part of the 1980 Volvo Grand Prix. It was the third and last edition of the tournament and was held from March 31 through April 6, 1980. Second-seeded Wojciech Fibak won the singles title and earned $15,000 first-prize money.

== Finals ==
=== Singles ===
(Poland) Wojciech Fibak defeated (United States) Eliot Teltscher 6–4, 7–5

- It was Fibak's 2nd singles title of the year and the 10th of his career.

=== Doubles ===
(United States) Terry Moor / (United States) Eliot Teltscher defeated (South Africa) Raymond Moore / (South Africa) Robert Trogolo 7–6, 6–1

- It was Moor's only doubles title of the year and the 2nd of his career. It was Teltscher's only doubles title of the year and the 2nd of his career.
