= 1980 United Bank Classic =

- Date: February 18–24
- Edition: 9th
- Category: Grand Prix
- Draw: 32S / 16D
- Prize money: $125,000
- Surface: Carpet / indoor
- Location: Denver, Colorado, U.S.

Champions

Singles
- (United States) Gene Mayer

Doubles
- (United States) Steve Denton / (South Africa) Kevin Curren
- Denver Open

The 1980 United Bank Classic, also known as the Denver WCT, was a men's tennis tournament played on indoor carpet courts in Denver, Colorado in the United States that was part of the 1980 Grand Prix circuit. It was the ninth edition of the tournament and took place from February 18 through February 24, 1980. Second-seeded Gene Mayer won the singles competition.

== Finals ==
=== Singles ===
(United States) Gene Mayer defeated (United States) Victor Amaya 6–4, 6–1

- It was Mayer's 1st singles title of the year and the 3rd of his career.

=== Doubles ===
(United States) Steve Denton / (South Africa) Kevin Curren defeated (Poland) Wojciech Fibak / (Switzerland) Heinz Günthardt 7–5, 6–2
