= Friendship Cup (tennis) =

Defunct tennis tournament
- Tour: Grand Prix circuit
- Founded: 1979
- Abolished: 1980
- Editions: 2
- Location: San José, Costa Rica
- Surface: Hard / outdoors

The Friendship Cup is a defunct men's tennis tournament that was played on the Grand Prix Tennis Circuit from 1979 to 1980. Also known as the Costa Rica International the event was held in March in San José, Costa Rica and was played on outdoor hardcourts. Total prize money for both editions was $50,000.

== Past finals ==
=== Singles ===
Year	Champions	Runners-up	Score
1979	(South Africa) Bernard Mitton	(United States) Tom Gorman	6–4, 6–1, 6–3
1980	(Argentina) José Luis Clerc	(United States) Jimmy Connors	4–6, 2–6, ret.

=== Doubles ===
Year	Champions	Runners-up	Score
1979	(Argentina) Guillermo Vilas (Romania) Ion Țiriac	(India) Anand Amritraj (Australia) Colin Dibley	6–4, 2–6, 6–4
1980	(Chile) Álvaro Fillol (Chile) Jaime Fillol	(India) Anand Amritraj (United States) Nick Saviano	6–2, 7–6
