= Bill Maze (tennis) =

American tennis player

- Full name: William Maze
- Country (sports): United States
- Born: February 9, 1956 (age 69); Bakersfield, California
- Plays: Right-handed

Singles
- Career record: 11–31
- Highest ranking: No. 153 (December 26, 1979)

Grand Slam singles results
- Australian Open: 2R (1979)
- French Open: 1R (1979, 1980)
- US Open: 1R (1977, 1980)

Doubles
- Career record: 48–66
- Career titles: 2
- Highest ranking: No. 68 (January 3, 1979)

Grand Slam doubles results
- Australian Open: QF (1982)
- French Open: 2R (1979)
- Wimbledon: 1R (1979)
- US Open: 2R (1979, 1982)

William Maze (born February 9, 1956) is a former professional tennis player from the United States.

Maze enjoyed most of his tennis success while playing doubles. During his career he won two doubles titles, both times partnering John McEnroe. He achieved a career-high doubles ranking of world No. 87 in 1983.

== Career finals ==
=== Doubles (2 titles) ===
Result	W–L	Date	Tournament	Surface	Partner	Opponents	Score
Win	1–0	Sep 1978	Hartford, U.S.	Carpet (i)	(United States) John McEnroe	(Australia) Mark Edmondson (United States) Van Winitsky	6–3, 3–6, 7–5
Win	2–0	Aug 1980	South Orange, U.S.	Clay	(United States) John McEnroe	(United States) Fritz Buehning (United States) Van Winitsky	7–6, 6–4
