= Van Winitsky =

American tennis player (born 1959)

- Country (sports): United States
- Born: March 12, 1959 (age 67) Miami, Florida, U.S.
- Height: 1.83 m (6 ft 0 in)
- Turned pro: 1978
- Retired: 1985
- Plays: Left-handed
- Prize money: $408,120

Singles
- Career record: 106–133
- Career titles: 3
- Highest ranking: No. 35 (February 8, 1982)

Grand Slam singles results
- French Open: 3R (1980)
- Wimbledon: 2R (1978)
- US Open: 3R (1980)

Doubles
- Career record: 150–119
- Career titles: 9
- Highest ranking: No. 7 (October 10, 1983)

Grand Slam doubles results
- French Open: 2R (1978, 1980)
- Wimbledon: 3R (1979)
- US Open: F (1983)

Mixed doubles

Grand Slam mixed doubles results
- Wimbledon: 2R (1979, 1980)

Van Winitsky (born March 12, 1959) is a former professional tennis player from the United States. He achieved a career-high rankings of World No. 7 in doubles in October 1983 and world No. 35 in singles in February 1984.

== Early and personal life ==
Winitsky was born in Miami, Florida, lived in Lauderhill, Florida, and is Jewish. His father Manny Winitsky was the best player of his age in Florida for 15 years, beginning at age 45. He lives in Delray Beach, Florida. Van attended North Miami Beach Senior High School and won the Florida state high school singles tennis championships as a freshman in 1974.

== Tennis career ==
Winitsky won Junior Wimbledon, Junior U.S. Open and Junior Nat'l at Kalamazoo, Mich. in singles and doubles in 1977 and won 3 Junior Orange Bowl singles titles. He played college tennis for UCLA for one and a half years, and was an All American. He played on the 1978 U.S. Davis Cup team in with John McEnroe, Brian Gottfried, and Harold Solomon.

Winitsky enjoyed most of his tennis success while playing doubles. During his career, he won 9 ATP Tour doubles titles and finished runner-up an additional 11 times. Partnering Fritz Buehning in doubles, Winitsky finished runner-up at the 1983 US Open. Winitsky also was a quarter finalist in mixed doubles partnering with Rayni Fox Borinsky at the 1980 US Open. He won 3 ATP Tour singles titles and finished runner-up 1 additional time. His titles included 1981 Hong Kong Seiko Open over Mark Edmondson of Australia, 1982 Hollywood Bowl Classic in Guaruja, Brazil over Carlos Kirmayr of Brazil, and 1982 Hilton Head Shipyard WCT over Chris Lewis of New Zealand in the finals. His runner-up finish was the 1978 Cleveland Grand Prix against Peter Feigl of Austria.

At just before 21st birthday, he had surgery that resulted in a 16-inch scar and atrophied muscles. In 1985, he retired from ATP Tour after winning the WTT conference championships for the Miami Beach Breakers.

== Career finals ==
=== Singles (3 titles, 1 runner-up) ===
Result	W/L	Date	Tournament	Surface	Opponent	Score
Loss	0–1	Aug 1978	Cleveland, U.S.	Hard	(Austria) Peter Feigl	6–4, 3–6, 3–6
Win	1–1	Nov 1981	Hong Kong	Hard	(Australia) Mark Edmondson	6–4, 6–7^{(7–9)}, 6–4
Win	2–1	Jan 1982	Guarujá, Brazil	Clay	(Brazil) Carlos Kirmayr	6–3, 6–3
Win	3–1	Apr 1982	Hilton Head, U.S.	Clay	(New Zealand) Chris Lewis	6–4, 6–4

=== Doubles (9 titles, 11 runner-ups) ===
Result	W/L	Date	Tournament	Surface	Partner	Opponents	Score
Win	1–0	Apr 1978	Tulsa, U.S.	Hard (i)	(New Zealand) Russell Simpson	(Brazil) Carlos Kirmayr (Ecuador) Ricardo Ycaza	4–6, 7–6, 6–2
Win	2–0	Aug 1978	North Conway, U.S.	Clay	(United Kingdom) Robin Drysdale	(United States) Mike Fishbach (South Africa) Bernard Mitton	4–6, 7–6, 6–3
Loss	2–1	Aug 1978	Boston, U.S.	Clay	(Switzerland) Heinz Günthardt	(Paraguay) Víctor Pecci (Hungary) Balázs Taróczy	3–6, 6–3, 1–6
Loss	2–2	Sep 1978	Hartford WCT, U.S.	Carpet	(Australia) Mark Edmondson	(United States) John McEnroe (United States) Bill Maze	3–6, 6–3, 5–7
Win	3–2	Nov 1978	Buenos Aires, Argentina	Clay	(New Zealand) Chris Lewis	(Argentina) José Luis Clerc (Chile) Belus Prajoux	6–4, 3–6, 6–0
Loss	3–3	Apr 1980	Tulsa, U.S.	Hard (i)	(Paraguay) Francisco González	(United States) Robert Lutz (United States) Dick Stockton	6–2, 6–7, 2–6
Loss	3–4	Aug 1980	South Orange, U.S.	Clay	(United States) Fritz Buehning	(United States) Bill Maze (United States) John McEnroe	6–7, 4–6
Win	4–4	Jul 1981	Washington, D.C., U.S.	Clay	(Mexico) Raúl Ramírez	(Czechoslovakia) Pavel Složil (United States) Ferdi Taygan	5–7, 7–6, 7–6
Loss	4–5	Aug 1981	Indianapolis, U.S.	Clay	(Mexico) Raúl Ramírez	(South Africa) Kevin Curren (United States) Steve Denton	3–6, 7–5, 5–7
Win	5–5	Aug 1981	Cleveland, U.S.	Hard	(United States) Erik van Dillen	(Australia) Syd Ball (Australia) Ross Case	6–4, 5–7, 7–5
Win	6–5	Oct 1981	Tel Aviv, Israel	Hard	(United States) Steve Meister	(United Kingdom) John Feaver (United States) Steve Krulevitz	3–6, 6–3, 6–3
Loss	6–6	Nov 1981	Bangkok, Thailand	Carpet	(United States) Lloyd Bourne	(United States) John Austin (United States) Mike Cahill	3–6, 6–7
Loss	6–7	Apr 1982	Las Vegas, U.S.	Hard	(Brazil) Carlos Kirmayr	(United States) Sherwood Stewart (United States) Ferdi Taygan	6–7, 4–6
Loss	6–8	Apr 1982	Hilton Head WCT, U.S.	Clay	(United States) Alan Waldman	(Australia) Mark Edmondson (Australia) Rod Frawley	1–6, 5–7
Win	7–8	Jul 1982	Washington, D.C., U.S.	Clay	(Mexico) Raúl Ramírez	(Chile) Hans Gildemeister (Ecuador) Andrés Gómez	7–5, 7–6
Win	8–8	Aug 1982	South Orange, U.S.	Clay	(Mexico) Raúl Ramírez	(United States) Jai DiLouie (United States) Blaine Willenborg	3–6, 6–4, 6–1
Loss	8–9	Nov 1982	Hong Kong	Hard	(Australia) Kim Warwick	(United States) Charles Strode (United States) Morris Strode	4–6, 6–3, 2–6
Loss	8–10	Jan 1983	Guarujá, Brazil	Hard	(Israel) Shlomo Glickstein	(United States) Tim Gullikson (Czechoslovakia) Tomáš Šmíd	7–5, 6–7, 3–6
Loss	8–11	Sep 1983	U.S. Open	Hard	(United States) Fritz Buehning	(United States) Peter Fleming (United States) John McEnroe	3–6, 4–6, 2–6
Win	9–11	Sep 1983	Dallas, U.S.	Hard	(Nigeria) Nduka Odizor	(United States) Steve Denton (United States) Sherwood Stewart	6–3, 7–5

== See also ==
- List of select Jewish tennis players
