= Howard Schoenfield =

American tennis player (1957–2020)

- Full name: Howard David Schoenfield
- Country (sports): United States
- Born: November 15, 1957; Fort Hood, Texas, U.S.
- Died: July 8, 2020 (aged 62); South Beach, Florida, U.S.
- Plays: Right-handed

Singles
- Career record: 11–42
- Career titles: 1
- Highest ranking: No. 68 (June 16, 1980)

Grand Slam singles results
- Wimbledon: 1R (1980)
- US Open: 1R (1975, 1977, 1979)

Doubles
- Career record: 2–11

Grand Slam doubles results
- US Open: 1R (1975)

Howard David Schoenfield (November 15, 1957 – July 8, 2020) was an American professional tennis player.

== Early life ==
Schoenfield was born in Fort Hood, Texas, on November 15, 1957, one of three sons of Leslie, a doctor for U.S. Army at Fort Hood Hospital, and Nancy Schoenfield. Soon after his birth the family moved to Rochester, Minnesota, as his father had gotten a job at the Mayo Clinic.

A promising junior tennis player, Schoenfield was evaluated by Jack Kramer in Los Angeles, which encouraged the family to move to Beverly Hills when Howard was 14. He developed a marijuana habit while in California and smoked as much as four times a day.

In 1974, his mother Nancy committed suicide by gunshot. The following year, he won the junior title at the 1975 US Open, but suffered a breakdown and was sent to a mental hospital, where he remained in for several months.

He returned to tennis in 1976. During his junior career, he won a total of eight national titles, matched only by John McEnroe.

== Professional career ==
Schoenfield's most notable performance on the professional circuit was when he won the Tulsa Grand Prix Tennis Tournament. En route to the final he defeated Bob Lutz and won the title over Trey Waltke.

Following his first round loss at the 1980 Surrey Grass Court Championships, Schoenfield was reported by umpire Bill Kempffer for "unsportsmanlike behavior". The umpire alleged that Schoenfield had not been trying. During the match, which he lost to Chris Lewis 1–6, 1–6, Schoenfield hit an underarm serve into the bottom of the net and on another occasion didn't make an attempt to return serve.

He made the main draw of the 1980 Wimbledon Championships.

At a Grand Prix tournament two months later, the Canadian International Tennis Championships, Schoenfield was ruled "unfit to play" and disqualified four games into his opening round match against John James. Grand Prix supervisor Dick Robertson stepped in when Schoenfield trailed 0–4 in the first set and ruled that his play was not up to professional standards. Schoenfield later claimed that an official had accused him of having taken drugs, an allegation that he denied. He was fined his entire match fee.

== Health problems and death ==
In 1981, Schoenfield was admitted to a halfway house near Jacksonville, Florida. He was diagnosed with schizophrenia.

Schoenfield died from complications of COVID-19 in July 2020, during the COVID-19 pandemic in Florida. He was 62.

== Grand Prix career finals ==
=== Singles: 1 (1–0) ===
Result	W/L	Year	Tournament	Surface	Opponent	Score
Win	1–0	Apr 1980	Tulsa, United States	Hard	(United States) Trey Waltke	5–7, 6–1, 6–0
