= Álvaro Fillol =

Chilean tennis player

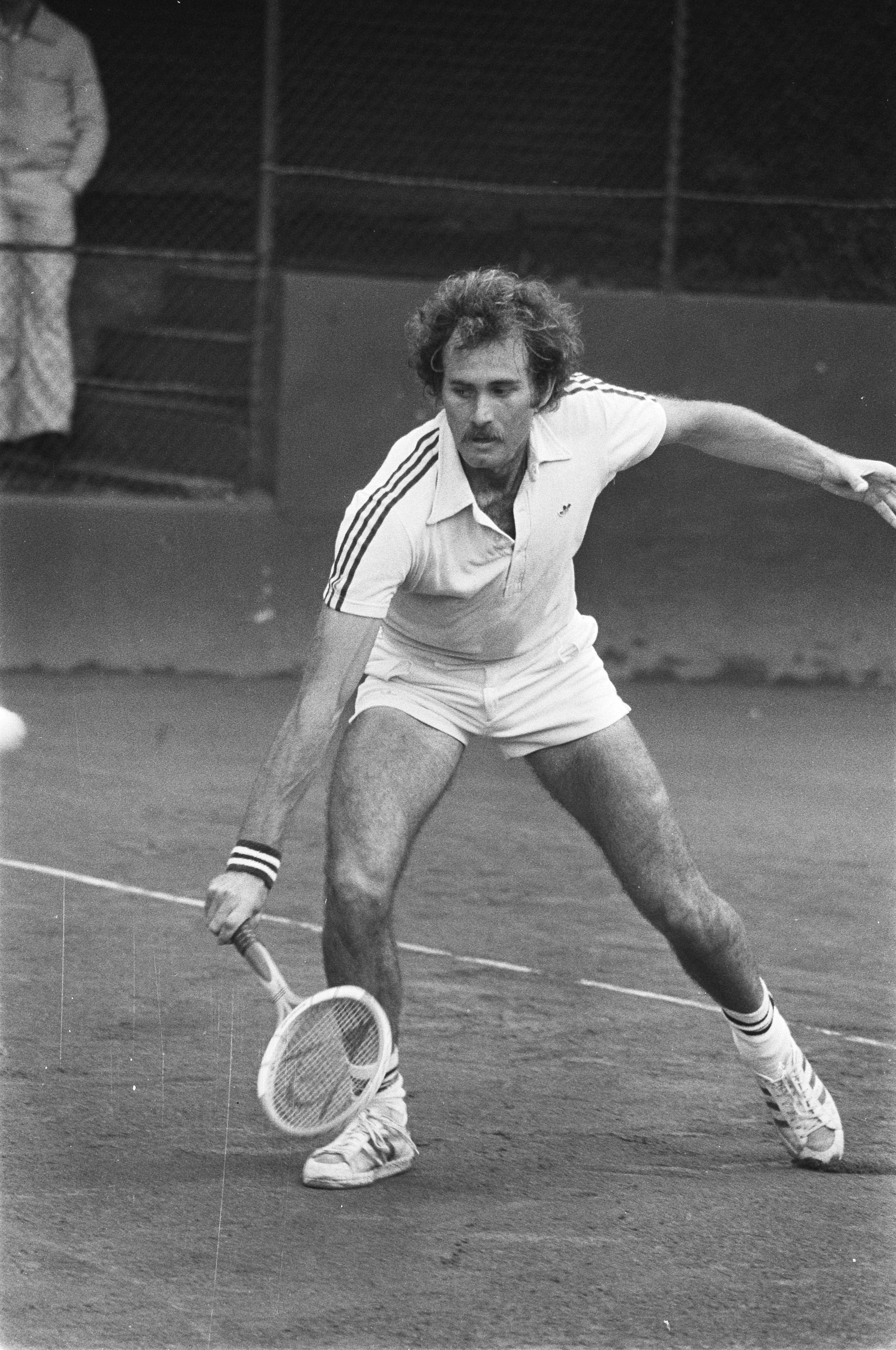
- Fillol at the 1978 Dutch Open
- Country (sports): Chile
- Born: 4 December 1952 (age 73) Santiago, Chile
- Plays: Right–handed (one-handed backhand)

Singles
- Career record: 32–84
- Career titles: 0

Grand Slam singles results
- French Open: 2R (1981)
- Wimbledon: 1R (1978, 1979, 1980)
- US Open: 2R (1975, 1977)

Doubles
- Career record: 108–124
- Career titles: 5

Grand Slam doubles results
- French Open: QF (1979)
- Wimbledon: 1R (1977, 1978, 1979)
- US Open: QF (1977)

Team competitions
- Davis Cup: F (1976)

Álvaro Fillol Durán (born 4 December 1952), is a former professional tennis player from Chile. He enjoyed most of his tennis success while playing doubles. During his career he won 5 doubles titles. He is the younger brother of tennis player Jaime Fillol, the uncle of Jaime Fillol Jr., and the great-uncle of Nicolás Jarry.

== Career finals ==
=== Doubles (5 titles, 2 runner-ups) ===
Result	W/L	Date	Tournament	Surface	Partner	Opponents	Score
Win	1–0	Apr 1978	Las Vegas, U.S.	Hard	(Chile) Jaime Fillol	(South Africa) Bob Hewitt (Mexico) Raúl Ramírez	6–3, 7–6
Win	2–0	Nov 1978	Bogotá, Colombia	Clay	(Chile) Jaime Fillol	(Chile) Hans Gildemeister (Paraguay) Víctor Pecci	6–4, 6–3
Loss	2–1	Dec 1978	Santiago, Chile	Clay	(Chile) Jaime Fillol	(Chile) Hans Gildemeister (Paraguay) Víctor Pecci	4–6, 3–6
Win	3–1	Nov 1979	Quito, Ecuador	Clay	(Chile) Jaime Fillol	(Colombia) Iván Molina (Colombia) Jairo Velasco, Sr.	6–7, 6–3, 6–1
Win	4–1	Mar 1980	San Jose, Costa Rica	Hard	(Chile) Jaime Fillol	(India) Anand Amritraj (United States) Nick Saviano	6–2, 7–6
Win	5–1	Nov 1980	Bogotá, Colombia	Clay	(Brazil) Carlos Kirmayr	(Ecuador) Andrés Gómez (Ecuador) Ricardo Ycaza	6–4, 6–3
Loss	5–2	Nov 1981	Buenos Aires, Argentina	Clay	(Chile) Jaime Fillol	(Brazil) Marcos Hocevar (Brazil) João Soares	6–7, 7–6, 4–6
