= Tulsa Grand Prix Tennis Tournament =

Defunct tennis tournament
- Event name: Bank of Oklahoma Classic
- Tour: Grand Prix circuit
- Founded: 1978
- Abolished: 1980
- Editions: 3
- Location: Tulsa, Oklahoma, U.S.
- Venue: Shadow Mountain Racket Club
- Surface: Hard / outdoor

The Tulsa Grand Prix Tennis Tournament was a men's tennis tournament played in Tulsa, Oklahoma in the United States. The event was played as part of the Grand Prix circuit from 1978 through 1980. The event was sponsored as Bank of Oklahoma Tennis Classic $50,000 and played at Shadow Mountain Racket Club on outdoor hard courts.

== Finals ==
=== Singles ===
Year	Champions	Runners-up	Score
1978	(United States) Eddie Dibbs	(United States) Pat Du Pré	6–7, 6–2, 7–5
1979	(United States) Jimmy Connors	(United States) Eddie Dibbs	6–7, 7–5, 6–1
1980	(United States) Howard Schoenfield	(United States) Trey Waltke	5–7, 6–1, 6–0

=== Doubles ===
Year	Champions	Runners-up	Score
1978	(New Zealand) Russell Simpson (United States) Van Winitsky	(Brazil) Carlos Kirmayr (Ecuador) Ricardo Ycaza	4–6, 7–6, 6–2
1979	(Paraguay) Francisco González (United States) Eliot Teltscher	(Australia) Colin Dibley (United States) Tom Gullikson	6–7, 7–5, 6–3
1980	(United States) Robert Lutz (United States) Dick Stockton	(Paraguay) Francisco González (United States) Van Winitsky	2–6, 7–6, 6–2

== See also ==
- Tulsa Invitation (a combined international clay court tournament played from 1958 to 1975).
