= José Luis Clerc =

Argentine tennis player (born 1958)

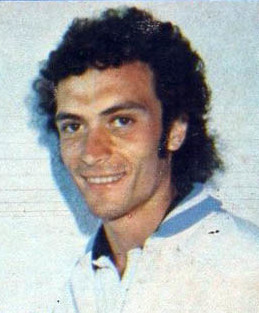
- Country (sports): Argentina
- Residence: Miami, United States
- Born: 16 August 1958 (age 68) Buenos Aires, Argentina
- Height: 1.85 m (6 ft 1 in)
- Turned pro: 1977
- Retired: 1986 (from full-time playing); 1995 (last match)
- Plays: Right-handed (one-handed backhand)

Singles
- Career record: 378–152 (71.32%)
- Career titles: 25 (listed by ATP)
- Highest ranking: No. 4 (3 August 1981)

Grand Slam singles results
- Australian Open: 2R (1980)
- French Open: SF (1981, 1982)
- Wimbledon: 4R (1979)
- US Open: 4R (1979, 1981)

Other tournaments
- Tour Finals: QF (1982)
- WCT Finals: QF (1982)

Doubles
- Career record: 110–99
- Career titles: 2
- Highest ranking: No. 30 (8 October 1979)

Grand Slam doubles results
- French Open: SF (1981)
- Wimbledon: 2R (1977, 1979, 1981)

José Luis Clerc (Spanish pronunciation: [xoseˈlwis ˈkleɾk]; born 16 August 1958), also known by the nickname Batata, is a former professional tennis player from Argentina. He reached a career-high Association of Tennis Professionals (ATP) world No. 4 singles ranking on 3 August 1981, following a run of 25 consecutive match wins after Wimbledon.

== Tennis career ==
Clerc represented Argentina for the Davis Cup from 1976 to 1989. He and Guillermo Vilas led Argentina to its first Davis Cup final in 1981 to set up a tie against United States in Cincinnati, Ohio. After Vilas lost the first rubber in straight sets to John McEnroe, Clerc defeated Roscoe Tanner in straight sets in the second rubber to level the tie. During the third rubber, partnering Vilas, the pair lost to Fleming/McEnroe in doubles, 9–11 in the fifth and deciding set. Clerc then played McEnroe in the fourth rubber and eventually lost in five sets.

Clerc, with Vilas and Carlos Gattiker won the 1980 World Team Cup in Düsseldorf. Clerc defeated former French Open champion Adriano Panatta in two sets. Argentina eventually beat Italy 3–0 to claim the title.

In 1981, Clerc entered the French Open with an 11-match win streak and defeated Jimmy Connors in the quarterfinals, in five sets, to extend it to 16. The streak ended when Clerc lost in five sets against Ivan Lendl. Later that year, starting after Wimbledon, Clerc won another 28 consecutive matches before losing in the third round of the US Open.

In 1982, Clerc reached the semifinals of the French Open for the second consecutive year, losing to 17-year-old Swedish teenager Mats Wilander in four sets. Wilander would go on to beat Vilas in the final in 4 sets to become the youngest winner of a Grand Slam at the time.

Injuries began to plague Clerc since 1984, and his consistency dropped. Clerc never recovered and only played sporadically after 1985.

He received the ATP Sportsmanship Award in 1981, and Argentine Konex Awards in 1980 and 1990.

== ATP career finals ==
=== Singles: 35 (25 titles, 10 runners-up) ===
Legend Grand Slam tournaments (0–0) Year-end championships (0–0) Grand Prix Super Series (1–1) Grand Prix / WCT Tour (24–9)	Titles by surface Hard (3–1) Clay (21–9) Grass (0–0) Carpet (1–0)

Result	W/L	Date	Tournament	Surface	Opponent	Score
Win	1–0	May 1978	Florence, Italy	Clay	(France) Patrice Dominguez	6–4, 6–2, 6–1
Loss	1–1	Jul 1978	Gstaad, Switzerland	Clay	(Argentina) Guillermo Vilas	3–6, 6–7, 4–6
Loss	1–2	Jul 1978	South Orange, New Jersey, U.S.	Clay	(Argentina) Guillermo Vilas	1–6, 3–6
Loss	1–3	Aug 1978	Toronto, Canada	Clay	(United States) Eddie Dibbs	7–5, 4–6, 1–6
Loss	1–4	Sep 1978	Aix-En-Provence, France	Clay	(Argentina) Guillermo Vilas	3–6, 0–6, 3–6
Win	2–4	Nov 1978	Buenos Aires, Argentina	Clay	(Paraguay) Víctor Pecci	6–4, 6–4
Win	3–4	Dec 1978	Santiago de Chile, Chile	Clay	(Paraguay) Víctor Pecci	3–6, 6–3, 6–3
Win	4–4	Apr 1979	Johannesburg, South Africa	Hard	(South Africa) Deon Joubert	6–2, 6–1
Loss	4–5	Nov 1979	Buenos Aires, Argentina (2)	Clay	(Argentina) Guillermo Vilas	1–6, 2–6, 2–6
Win	5–5	Mar 1980	San José de Costa Rica, Costa Rica	Hard	(United States) Jimmy Connors	4–6, 2–6, retired
Loss	5–6	Jul 1980	Washington D.C., US	Clay	(United States) Brian Gottfried	5–7, 6–4, 4–6
Win	6–6	Jul 1980	South Orange, New Jersey, U.S.	Clay	(United States) John McEnroe	6–3, 6–2
Win	7–6	Aug 1980	Indianapolis, Indiana, U.S.	Clay	(United States) Mel Purcell	7–5, 6–3
Win	8–6	Sep 1980	Madrid, Spain	Clay	(Argentina) Guillermo Vilas	6–3, 1–6, 1–6, 6–4, 6–2
Win	9–6	Nov 1980	Quito, Ecuador	Clay	(Paraguay) Víctor Pecci	6–4, 1–6, 10–8
Win	10–6	Nov 1980	Buenos Aires, Argentina (2)	Clay	(West Germany) Rolf Gehring	6–7, 2–6, 7–5, 6–0, 6–3
Win	11–6	May 1981	Florence, Italy (2)	Clay	(Mexico) Raúl Ramírez	6–1, 6–2
Win	12–6	May 1981	Italian Open, Rome	Clay	(Paraguay) Víctor Pecci	6–3, 6–4, 6–0
Win	13–6	Jul 1981	Boston, Massachusetts, U.S.	Clay	(Chile) Hans Gildemeister	0–6, 6–2, 6–2
Win	14–6	Jul 1981	Washington D.C., US	Clay	(Argentina) Guillermo Vilas	7–5, 6–2
Win	15–6	Jul 1981	North Conway, New Hampshire, U.S.	Clay	(Argentina) Guillermo Vilas	6–3, 6–2
Win	16–6	Aug 1981	Indianapolis, Indiana, U.S. (2)	Clay	(Czechoslovakia) Ivan Lendl	4–6, 6–4, 6–2
Loss	16–7	Oct 1981	Basel, Switzerland	Hard (i)	(Czechoslovakia) Ivan Lendl	2–6, 3–6, 0–6
Win	17–7	Feb 1982	Richmond WCT, Virginia, U.S.	Carpet (i)	(United States) Fritz Buehning	3–6, 6–3, 6–4, 6–3
Loss	17–8	Apr 1982	Houston WCT, Texas, US	Clay	(Czechoslovakia) Ivan Lendl	6–3, 6–7, 0–6, 4–1, ret.
Win	18–8	Jun 1982	Venice, Italy	Clay	(Australia) Peter McNamara	7–6, 6–1
Win	19–8	Jul 1982	Gstaad, Switzerland	Clay	(Argentina) Guillermo Vilas	6–1, 6–3, 6–2
Win	20–8	Jul 1982	Zell am See WCT, Austria	Clay	(Switzerland) Heinz Günthardt	6–0, 3–6, 6–2, 6–1
Win	21–8	Nov 1982	São Paulo, Brazil	Clay (i)	(Brazil) Marcos Hocevar	6–2, 6–7, 6–3
Win	22–8	Jan 1983	Guarujá, Brazil	Hard	(Sweden) Mats Wilander	3–6, 7–5, 6–1
Win	23–8	Jul 1983	Boston, Massachusetts, U.S. (2)	Clay	(United States) Jimmy Arias	6–3, 6–1
Win	24–8	Jul 1983	Washington D.C., U.S. (2)	Clay	(United States) Jimmy Arias	6–3, 3–6, 6–0
Win	25–8	Jul 1983	North Conway, New Hampshire, U.S. (2)	Clay	(Ecuador) Andrés Gómez	6–3, 6–1
Loss	25–9	Sep 1983	Palermo, Italy	Clay	(United States) Jimmy Arias	2–6, 6–2, 0–6
Loss	25–10	Jul 1984	Boston, Massachusetts, U.S. (3)	Clay	(United States) Aaron Krickstein	6–7, 6–3, 4–6

Source: ATP

== Performance timeline ==
Key
W	F	SF	QF	#R	RR	Q#	DNQ	A	NH

(W) winner; (F) finalist; (SF) semifinalist; (QF) quarterfinalist; (#R) rounds 4, 3, 2, 1; (RR) round-robin stage; (Q#) qualification round; (DNQ) did not qualify; (A) absent; (NH) not held; (SR) strike rate (events won / competed); (W–L) win–loss record.

=== Singles ===
Tournament	1977		1978	1979	1980	1981	1982	1983	1984	1985	1986	1987	1988	1989	1990	SR	W–L
Grand Slam tournaments
Australian Open	A	A	1R	A	2R	A	A	A	A	A	NH	A	A	A	A	0 / 2	1–2
French Open	A		2R	2R	2R	SF	SF	2R	2R	3R	A	A	A	1R	A	0 / 9	17–9
Wimbledon	A		1R	4R	3R	3R	A	1R	A	A	A	A	A	A	A	0 / 5	7–5
US Open	A		3R	4R	1R	4R	1R	1R	A	1R	A	A	A	A	A	0 / 7	8–7
Win–loss	0–0		3–4	7–3	4–4	10–3	5–2	1–3	1–1	2–2	0–0	0–0	0–0	0–1	0–0	0 / 23	33–23
Year-end championship
Masters	Did not qualify				RR	RR	QF	1R	Did not qualify							0 / 4	2–6
Career statistics
Finals	0		7	2	7	7	6	5	1	0	0	0	0	0	0	35	
Titles	0		3	1	6	6	5	4	0	0	0	0	0	0	0	25	
Overall win–loss	1–3		50–17	56–22	73–23	58–14	65–22	31–15	16–14	24–14	0–0	0–0	0–0	1–4	0–0	375–148	
Win %	25%		75%	72%	76%	81%	75%	67%	53%	63%	–	–	–	20%	–	71.70%	
Year-end ranking	278		15	17	8	5	6	8	33	28		–	–	514			

== Notable rivalries ==
=== Clerc vs. Vilas ===
Clerc and Guillermo Vilas played each other 14 times in their careers, with Vilas leading 10–4. Vilas being a dominant force on clay for much of the second half of 1970s, Clerc was considered a rising star on clay during that time. All of their 14 meetings came after the quarterfinal stages (with one exception, which was at the Masters Grand Prix) and included eight finals. Vilas won their first six encounters before 1980, including four finals. However, since 1980, they had a tied record of 4–4, with Clerc winning all four of the finals.

== Personal life ==
Clerc married Annelie Czerner in 1980, and they have two sons and a daughter: Juan Pablo Clerc (born 23 September 1981), Dominique Clerc (born 12 January 1984), and Nicolás Clerc (born 19 October 1990). In 2005, they divorced, Clerc married with Gisela Medrano in 2008, with whom they have a daughter named Sophie (born 7 April 2011).

Clerc runs a tennis school in Argentina, participates in senior tournaments, and regularly serves as a tennis analyst for ESPN Latin America and ESPN Deportes.
