= 1981 French Open – Men's doubles =

Men's doubles
- 1981 French Open

Final
- Champion: (Switzerland) Heinz Günthardt (Hungary) Balázs Taróczy
- Runner-up: (United States) Terry Moor (United States) Eliot Teltscher
- Score: 6–2, 7–6, 6–3

Details
- Draw: 64
- Seeds: 16

Events
| Singles | men | women | | boys | girls |
| Doubles | men | women | mixed | boys | girls |
| WC Singles | men | women | quad |
| WC Doubles | men | women | quad |
| Legends | −45 | 45+ | women |
- French Open

The men's doubles tournament at the 1981 French Open was held from 25 May until 7 June 1981 on the outdoor clay courts at the Stade Roland Garros in Paris, France. Heinz Günthardt and Balázs Taróczy won the title, defeating Terry Moor and Eliot Teltscher in the final.

== Seeds ==
1. (Australia) Peter McNamara / (Australia) Paul McNamee (quarterfinals)
2. n/a
3. (United States) Brian Gottfried / (Mexico) Raúl Ramírez (first round)
4. (Chile) Hans Gildemeister / (Ecuador) Andrés Gómez (second round)
5. (Italy) Paolo Bertolucci / (Italy) Adriano Panatta (first round)
6. (Australia) David Carter / (Australia) Paul Kronk (second round)
7. (United States) Bruce Manson / (South Africa) Raymond Moore (quarterfinals)
8. (United States) Terry Moor / (United States) Eliot Teltscher (final)
9. (Czechoslovakia) Pavel Složil / (Czechoslovakia) Tomáš Šmíd (third round)
10. (Switzerland) Heinz Günthardt / (Hungary) Balázs Taróczy (champions)
11. (Australia) Mark Edmondson / (United States) Ferdi Taygan (first round)
12. (United States) Craig Edwards / (South Africa) Eddie Edwards (third round)
13. (United States) Fred McNair / (United States) Henry Pfister (third round)
14. (South Africa) Kevin Curren / (United States) Steve Denton (second round)
15. (United States) Tracy Delatte / (United States) Trey Waltke (first round)
16. (Argentina) Ricardo Cano / (Spain) Ángel Giménez (third round)

== Draw ==
Key

- Q = Qualifier
- WC = Wild card
- LL = Lucky loser
- Alt = Alternate
- ITF = ITF entry
- PR = Protected ranking
- SR = Special ranking
- SE = Special exempt
- JE = Junior exempt
- JR = Junior Accelerator Programme entrant
- CO = College Accelerator Programme entrant
- NG = Next Gen Accelerator Program entrant
- w/o = Walkover
- r = Retired
- d = Defaulted

=== Finals ===
Quarterfinals
1 | (Australia) Peter McNamara (Australia) Paul McNamee | 6 | 7 | 1
10 | (Switzerland) Heinz Günthardt (Hungary) Balázs Taróczy | 7 | 6 | 6
(Argentina) José Luis Clerc (Romania) Ilie Năstase | 6 | 7
7 | (United States) Bruce Manson (South Africa) Raymond Moore | 4 | 5
8 | (United States) Terry Moor (United States) Eliot Teltscher | 4 | 6 | 6
(Switzerland) Markus Günthardt (Philippines) Beeyong Sison | 6 | 3 | 2
(United States) Mel Purcell (United States) Vincent Van Patten | 3 | 3
(Austria) Peter Feigl (United States) Billy Martin | 6 | 6

Semifinals
10 | (Switzerland) Heinz Günthardt (Hungary) Balázs Taróczy | 5 | 6 | 6 | 6
(Argentina) José Luis Clerc (Romania) Ilie Năstase | 7 | 3 | 4 | 2
8 | (United States) Terry Moor (United States) Eliot Teltscher | 4 | 7 | 7 | 5 | 6
(Austria) Peter Feigl (United States) Billy Martin | 6 | 5 | 6 | 7 | 4

Final
10 | (Switzerland) Heinz Günthardt (Hungary) Balázs Taróczy | 6 | 7 | 6
8 | (United States) Terry Moor (United States) Eliot Teltscher | 2 | 6 | 3

=== Top half ===
==== Section 1 ====
First round
1 | (Australia) P McNamara (Australia) P McNamee | 7 | 6
(France) C Freyss (France) H Gauvain | 6 | 4
(France) B Fritz (France) G Goven | 6 | 7
(France) P Dominguez (France) D Naegelen | 4 | 5
(United States) E Fromm (United States) C Leeds | 6 | 7
(South Africa) R Chappell (South Africa) S van der Merwe | 4 | 6
(France) C Roger-Vasselin (France) T Tulasne | 3 | 4
13 | (United States) F McNair (United States) H Pfister | 6 | 6
5 | (Italy) P Bertolucci (Italy) A Panatta | 6 | 3 | 3
(Argentina) E Bengoechea (Brazil) M Hocevar | 1 | 6 | 6
(Chile) R Acuña (Chile) S Cortés | 7 | 6
(Argentina) A Gattiker (Argentina) C Gattiker | 5 | 3
(United States) R Fagel (Spain) R Vizcaíno Mallol | 4 | 6 | 6
(Argentina) A Ganzábal (Argentina) G Guerrero | 6 | 3 | 2
(United States) K Cook (United States) S Meister | 3 | 5
10 | (Switzerland) H Günthardt (Hungary) B Taróczy | 6 | 7

Second round
1 | (Australia) P McNamara (Australia) P McNamee | 6 | 6
(France) B Fritz (France) G Goven | 4 | 1
(United States) E Fromm (United States) C Leeds | 7 | 4 | 8
13 | (United States) F McNair (United States) H Pfister | 6 | 6 | 10
(Argentina) E Bengoechea (Brazil) M Hocevar | 6 | 6
(Chile) R Acuña (Chile) S Cortés | 4 | 4
(United States) R Fagel (Spain) R Vizcaíno Mallol | 2 | 5
10 | (Switzerland) H Günthardt (Hungary) B Taróczy | 6 | 7

Third round
1 | (Australia) P McNamara (Australia) P McNamee | 6 | 6
13 | (United States) F McNair (United States) H Pfister | 1 | 2
(Argentina) E Bengoechea (Brazil) M Hocevar | 6 | 3 | 3
10 | (Switzerland) H Günthardt (Hungary) B Taróczy | 3 | 6 | 6

Quarterfinals
1 | (Australia) P McNamara (Australia) P McNamee | 6 | 7 | 1
10 | (Switzerland) H Günthardt (Hungary) B Taróczy | 7 | 6 | 6

==== Section 2 ====
First round
4 | (Chile) H Gildemeister (Ecuador) A Gómez | 7 | 6
(Argentina) G Aubone (Peru) F Maynetto | 6 | 3
(Argentina) JL Clerc (Romania) I Năstase | 6 | 6
(France) J Potier (France) P Torre | 1 | 0
(Spain) J López-Maeso (Spain) M Mir-Rodón | 7 | 6
(United States) J Arias (United States) B Testerman | 6 | 3
(Australia) B Guan (Australia) W Hampson | 6 | 4 | 5
16 | (Argentina) R Cano (Spain) Á Giménez | 4 | 6 | 7
7 | (United States) B Manson (South Africa) R Moore | 2 | 6 | 6
(Romania) A Dîrzu (Romania) F Segărceanu | 6 | 3 | 4
(Spain) J García Requena (United States) B Nichols | 7 | 6
(France) C Bernelle (France) J-M Piacentile | 5 | 3
(Sweden) P Hjertquist (United States) S Krulevitz | 4 | 6 | 6
(United States) C Skakle (United States) C Wittus | 6 | 4 | 1
(Socialist Federal Republic of Yugoslavia) Ž Franulović (Paraguay) F González | 7 | 5 | 7
11 | (Australia) M Edmondson (United States) F Taygan | 6 | 7 | 5

Second round
4 | (Chile) H Gildemeister (Ecuador) A Gómez | 6 | 4 | 4
(Argentina) JL Clerc (Romania) I Năstase | 2 | 6 | 6
(Spain) J López-Maeso (Spain) M Mir-Rodón | 7 | 3 | 4
16 | (Argentina) R Cano (Spain) Á Giménez | 6 | 6 | 6
7 | (United States) B Manson (South Africa) R Moore | 4 | 6 | 6
(Spain) J García Requena (United States) B Nichols | 6 | 4 | 2
(Sweden) P Hjertquist (United States) S Krulevitz | 6 | 2 | 6
(Socialist Federal Republic of Yugoslavia) Ž Franulović (Paraguay) F González | 3 | 6 | 2

Third round
(Argentina) JL Clerc (Romania) I Năstase | 6 | 7
16 | (Argentina) R Cano (Spain) Á Giménez | 2 | 6
7 | (United States) B Manson (South Africa) R Moore | 1 | 6 | 6
(Sweden) P Hjertquist (United States) S Krulevitz | 6 | 3 | 3

Quarterfinals
(Argentina) JL Clerc (Romania) I Năstase | 6 | 7
7 | (United States) B Manson (South Africa) R Moore | 4 | 5

=== Bottom half ===
==== Section 3 ====
First round
9 | (Czechoslovakia) P Složil (Czechoslovakia) T Šmíd | 3 | 6 | 6
(Australia) R Case (Chile) J Fillol | 6 | 3 | 4
(United States) L Stefanki (United States) Robert Van't Hof | 6 | 6
(Switzerland) C Dowdeswell (West Germany) P Holl | 3 | 3
(Brazil) C Kirmayr (Brazil) C Motta | 6 | 6
(France) L Courteau (France) F Jauffret | 2 | 0
(Bolivia) M Martinez (Argentina) E Ruiz-Bry | 7 | 3 | 1
8 | (United States) T Moor (United States) E Teltscher | 6 | 6 | 6
15 | (United States) T Delatte (United States) T Waltke | 3 | 4
(United States) M Davis (United States) C Dunk | 6 | 6
(Switzerland) M Günthardt (Philippines) B Sison | 7 | 7
(France) É Deblicker (France) P Proisy | 6 | 6
(Australia) J Fitzgerald (Australia) C Johnstone | 6 | 6
(Israel) S Glickstein (South Africa) D Schneider | 1 | 4
(United States) T Mayotte (United States) R Meyer | 4 | 6 | 6
3 | (United States) Brian Gottfried (Mexico) R Ramírez | 6 | 3 | 4

Second round
9 | (Czechoslovakia) P Složil (Czechoslovakia) T Šmíd | 6 | 6
(United States) L Stefanki (United States) Robert Van't Hof | 4 | 0
(Brazil) C Kirmayr (Brazil) C Motta | 6 | 3
8 | (United States) T Moor (United States) E Teltscher | 7 | 6
(United States) M Davis (United States) C Dunk | 4 | 4
(Switzerland) M Günthardt (Philippines) B Sison | 6 | 6
(Australia) J Fitzgerald (Australia) C Johnstone | 6 | 4
(United States) T Mayotte (United States) R Meyer | 7 | 6

Third round
9 | (Czechoslovakia) P Složil (Czechoslovakia) T Šmíd | 4 | 6
8 | (United States) T Moor (United States) E Teltscher | 6 | 7
(Switzerland) M Günthardt (Philippines) B Sison | 6 | 5 | 6
(United States) T Mayotte (United States) R Meyer | 2 | 7 | 4

Quarterfinals
8 | (United States) T Moor (United States) E Teltscher | 4 | 6 | 6
(Switzerland) M Günthardt (Philippines) B Sison | 6 | 3 | 2

==== Section 4 ====
First round
14 | (South Africa) K Curren (United States) S Denton | 6 | 7
(Belgium) B Boileau (Mexico) A González | 3 | 5
(Uruguay) JL Damiani (Ecuador) R Ycaza | 6 | 6
(India) R Krishnan (Spain) G Urpí | 2 | 2
(United States) M Purcell (United States) V Van Patten | 6 | 3 | 6
(Italy) G Marchetti (Italy) E Vattuone | 2 | 6 | 3
(France) H Leconte (France) G Moretton | 3 | 3
6 | (Australia) D Carter (Australia) P Kronk | 6 | 6
12 | (United States) C Edwards (South Africa) E Edwards | 6 | 6 | 7
(South Africa) D Visser (South Africa) J Yuill | 2 | 7 | 5
(West Germany) A Maurer (West Germany) W Popp | 5 | 6 | 6
(Belgium) A Brichant (Belgium) T Stevaux | 7 | 2 | 4
(Austria) P Feigl (United States) B Martin | 6 | 6
(France) D Bedel (France) P Portes | 3 | 4
(Australia) B Dyke (Australia) P Johnston | 6 | 2 | 0
Alt | (Argentina) R Carruthers (Argentina) F Dalla Fontana | 3 | 6 | 6

Second round
14 | (South Africa) K Curren (United States) S Denton | 6 | 3 | 5
(Uruguay) JL Damiani (Ecuador) R Ycaza | 3 | 6 | 7
(United States) M Purcell (United States) V Van Patten | 7 | 6
6 | (Australia) D Carter (Australia) P Kronk | 5 | 4
12 | (United States) C Edwards (South Africa) E Edwards | 4 | 6 | 7
(West Germany) A Maurer (West Germany) W Popp | 6 | 4 | 5
(Austria) P Feigl (United States) B Martin | 6 | 3 | 6
(Argentina) R Carruthers (Argentina) F Dalla Fontana | 2 | 6 | 1

Third round
(Uruguay) JL Damiani (Ecuador) R Ycaza | 3 | 4
(United States) M Purcell (United States) V Van Patten | 6 | 6
12 | (United States) C Edwards (South Africa) E Edwards | 6 | 3 | 3
(Austria) P Feigl (United States) B Martin | 2 | 6 | 6

Quarterfinals
(United States) M Purcell (United States) V Van Patten | 3 | 3
(Austria) P Feigl (United States) B Martin | 6 | 6
