= 1982 Bavarian Tennis Championships – Singles =

Singles
- 1982 Bavarian Tennis Championships

Final
- Champion: (United States) Gene Mayer
- Runner-up: (West Germany) Peter Elter
- Score: 3–6, 6–3, 6–2, 6–1

Details
- Draw: 32
- Seeds: 8

Events
Singles	Doubles
← 1981 ·	Bavarian Tennis Championships	· 1983 →

Chris Lewis was the defending champion, but lost in the second round this year.

Gene Mayer won the title, defeating Peter Elter 3–6, 6–3, 6–2, 6–1 in the final.

== Seeds ==
1. (Australia) Peter McNamara (second round)
2. (United States) Gene Mayer (champion)
3. (United States) Chip Hooper (quarterfinals)
4. (United States) Mel Purcell (second round)
5. (Israel) Shlomo Glickstein (quarterfinals)
6. (New Zealand) Chris Lewis (second round)
7. n/a
8. (Czechoslovakia) Stanislav Birner (second round)

== Draw ==
Key

- Q = Qualifier
- WC = Wild card
- LL = Lucky loser
- Alt = Alternate
- ITF = ITF entry
- PR = Protected ranking
- SR = Special ranking
- SE = Special exempt
- JE = Junior exempt
- JR = Junior Accelerator Programme entrant
- CO = College Accelerator Programme entrant
- NG = Next Gen Accelerator Program entrant
- w/o = Walkover
- r = Retired
- d = Defaulted

=== Final ===
Semifinals
(West Germany) Peter Elter	6	6
(West Germany) Damir Keretić	3	2
(Spain) José García	1	1
2	(United States) Gene Mayer	6	6

Final
(West Germany) Peter Elter	6	3	2	1
2	(United States) Gene Mayer	3	6	6	6

=== Section 1 ===
First round
1	(Australia) P McNamara	6	7
(India) R Krishnan	4	5
(Sweden) J Gunnarsson	2	1
(West Germany) P Elter	6	6
Q	(Australia) D Carter	3	3
(Sweden) S Simonsson	6	6
(France) J Potier	3	6
5	(Israel) S Glickstein	6	7
3	(United States) C Hooper	6	6
(France) G Moretton	3	1
(United States) S Krulevitz	6	6
(West Germany) U Pinner	4	3
(West Germany) D Keretić	4	6	7
(Argentina) A Ganzábal	6	1	6
Q	(West Germany) C Zipf	4	2
LL	(Czechoslovakia) J Granát	6	6

Second round
1	(Australia) P McNamara	1	6
(West Germany) P Elter	6	7
(Sweden) S Simonsson	2	2
5	(Israel) S Glickstein	6	6
3	(United States) C Hooper	7	6
(United States) S Krulevitz	6	4
(West Germany) D Keretić	7	4	7
LL	(Czechoslovakia) J Granát	5	6	6

Quarterfinals
(West Germany) P Elter	6	2	6
5	(Israel) S Glickstein	4	6	3
3	(United States) C Hooper	3	6	1
(West Germany) D Keretić	6	3	6

Semifinals
(West Germany) P Elter	6	6
(West Germany) D Keretić	3	2

=== Section 2 ===
First round
8	(Czechoslovakia) S Birner	6	6
(Zimbabwe) H Ismail	1	2
(France) C Roger-Vasselin	5	6	7
(West Germany) W Zirngibl	7	2	5
(Spain) J García	6	6
Q	(West Germany) K Meiler	4	4
(West Germany) R Gehring	4	4
4	(United States) M Purcell	6	6
6	(New Zealand) C Lewis	7	7
Q	(Brazil) M Hocevar	5	5
(Spain) J López-Maeso	7	6
(Spain) A Giménez	5	4
(West Germany) K Eberhard	3	6	6
(United States) T Moor	6	2	4
(West Germany) H Schwaier	2	2
2	(United States) G Mayer	6	6

Second round
8	(Czechoslovakia) S Birner	6	5	5
(France) C Roger-Vasselin	1	7	7
(Spain) J García	6	6
4	(United States) M Purcell	0	4
6	(New Zealand) C Lewis	3	1
(Spain) J López-Maeso	6	6
(West Germany) K Eberhard	1	6
2	(United States) G Mayer	6	7

Quarterfinals
(France) C Roger-Vasselin	2	1
(Spain) J García	6	6
(Spain) J López-Maeso	1	0
2	(United States) G Mayer	6	6

Semifinals
(Spain) J García	1	1
2	(United States) G Mayer	6	6
