= 1980 South American Championships – Singles =

Singles
- 1980 South American Championships
- 1979 Champion: (Argentina) Guillermo Vilas

Final
- Champion: (Argentina) José Luis Clerc
- Runner-up: (West Germany) Rolf Gehring
- Score: 6–7, 2–6, 7–5, 6–0, 6–3

Details
- Draw: 32
- Seeds: 8

Events
Singles	Doubles
- South American Championships

Guillermo Vilas was the defending champion but did not compete that year.

José Luis Clerc won in the final 6–7, 2–6, 7–5, 6–0, 6–3 against Rolf Gehring.

== Seeds ==
A champion seed is indicated in bold text while text in italics indicates the round in which that seed was eliminated.

1. n/a
2. (Argentina) **José Luis Clerc (champion)**
3. (Paraguay) Víctor Pecci (semifinals)
4. (Chile) Hans Gildemeister (quarterfinals)
5. (Bolivia) Mario Martinez (second round)
6. (West Germany) Rolf Gehring (final)
7. (Ecuador) Andrés Gómez (quarterfinals)
8. (Brazil) Marcos Hocevar (second round)

== Draw ==
Key

- Q = Qualifier
- WC = Wild card
- LL = Lucky loser
- Alt = Alternate
- ITF = ITF entry
- PR = Protected ranking
- SR = Special ranking
- SE = Special exempt
- JE = Junior exempt
- JR = Junior Accelerator Programme entrant
- CO = College Accelerator Programme entrant
- NG = Next Gen Accelerator Program entrant
- w/o = Walkover
- r = Retired
- d = Defaulted

=== Final ===
Semifinals
6	(West Germany) **Rolf Gehring**	3	**7**	**6**
3	(Paraguay) Víctor Pecci	**6**	6	4
(Uruguay) Jose Luis Damiani	0	4
2	(Argentina) **José Luis Clerc**	**6**	**6**

Final
6	(West Germany) Rolf Gehring	**7**	**6**	5	0	3
2	(Argentina) **José Luis Clerc**	6	2	**7**	**6**	**6**

=== Section 1 ===
First round
LL	(West Germany) **P Elter**	3	**6**	**7**
Q	(Argentina) A Gattiker	**6**	2	5
(West Germany) **K Eberhard**	6	**6**	**6**
(Argentina) G Guerrero	**7**	4	0
(Brazil) **C Kirmayr**	**6**	**6**
(Argentina) G Tiberti	4	4
(Sweden) S Simonsson	3	5
6	(West Germany) **R Gehring**	**6**	**7**
3	(Paraguay) **V Pecci**	**6**	**6**
(Brazil) J Soares	3	4
(Argentina) **R Cano**	**6**	**6**
Q	(Brazil) C Motta	4	3
(France) **C Freyss**	**6**	**7**
(Australia) D Carter	3	6
(France) C Casa	1	**6**	4
7	(Ecuador) **A Gómez**	**6**	2	**6**

Second round
LL	(West Germany) **P Elter**	**6**	**6**
(West Germany) K Eberhard	4	3
(Brazil) C Kirmayr	**7**	5	1
6	(West Germany) **R Gehring**	6	**7**	**6**
3	(Paraguay) **V Pecci**	**6**	**7**
(Argentina) R Cano	3	5
(France) C Freyss	3	2
7	(Ecuador) **A Gómez**	**6**	**6**

Quarterfinals
LL	(West Germany) P Elter	**7**	5	3
6	(West Germany) **R Gehring**	6	**7**	**6**
3	(Paraguay) **V Pecci**	**6**	**6**
7	(Ecuador) A Gómez	1	3

Semifinals
6	(West Germany) **R Gehring**	3	**7**	**6**
3	(Paraguay) V Pecci	**6**	6	4

=== Section 2 ===
First round
5	(Bolivia) **M Martinez**	**6**	**6**
(Australia) J James	1	2
(Uruguay) **J L Damiani**	**6**	**6**
Q	(Chile) B Prajoux	1	2
(Spain) **Á Giménez**	**7**	**6**
(Colombia) J Velasco, Sr.	5	3
(Colombia) Á Betancur	0	0^{r}
4	(Chile) **H Gildemeister**	**6**	3
8	(Brazil) **M Hocevar**	**6**	6	**6**
(United States) R Fagel	4	**7**	3
(Ecuador) **R Ycaza**	3	**6**	**6**
(France) D Bedel	**6**	0	1
(Brazil) **T Koch**	**7**	**6**
Q	(Argentina) R Carruthers	6	3
(Argentina) E Bengoechea	3	0
2	(Argentina) **J L Clerc**	**6**	**6**

Second round
5	(Bolivia) M Martinez	3	3
(Uruguay) **J L Damiani**	**6**	**6**
(Spain) Á Giménez	**6**	6	4
(Chile) **H Gildemeister**	1	**7**	**6**
8	(Brazil) M Hocevar	6	4
(Ecuador) **R Ycaza**	**7**	**6**
(Brazil) T Koch	**6**	2	1
2	(Argentina) **J L Clerc**	1	**6**	**6**

Quarterfinals
(Uruguay) **J L Damiani**	**7**	**6**
4	(Chile) H Gildemeister	5	1
(Ecuador) R Ycaza	4	4
2	(Argentina) **J L Clerc**	**6**	**6**

Semifinals
(Uruguay) J L Damiani	0	4
2	(Argentina) **J L Clerc**	**6**	**6**
