= 1981 South American Championships – Doubles =

Doubles
- 1981 South American Championships

Final
- Champions: (Brazil) Marcos Hocevar (Brazil) João Soares
- Runners-up: (Chile) Álvaro Fillol (Chile) Jaime Fillol
- Score: 7–6, 6–7, 6–4

Details
- Draw: 16
- Seeds: 4

Events
Singles	Doubles
← 1980 ·	South American Championships	· 1982 →

Hans Gildemeister and Andrés Gómez were the defending champions, but lost in the quarterfinals to Álvaro Fillol and Jaime Fillol.

Marcos Hocevar and João Soares won the title by defeating Álvaro and Jaime Fillol 7–6, 6–7, 6–4 in the final.

== Seeds ==
1. (Chile) Hans Gildemeister / (Ecuador) Andrés Gómez (quarterfinals)
2. (West Germany) Rolf Gehring / (United States) Ferdi Taygan (first round)
3. (Uruguay) José Luis Damiani / (Ecuador) Ricardo Ycaza (semifinals)
4. (Argentina) Ricardo Cano / (Chile) Belus Prajoux (semifinals)

== Draw ==
=== Key ===
- Q = Qualifier
- WC = Wild card
- LL = Lucky loser
- Alt = Alternate
- SE = Special exempt
- PR = Protected ranking
- ITF = ITF entry
- JE = Junior exempt
- w/o = Walkover
- r = Retired
- d = Defaulted
- SR = Special ranking

=== Draw ===
First round
1	(Chile) H Gildemeister (Ecuador) A Gómez	6	2	6
(Bolivia) R Benavides (Colombia) A Cortés	4	6	4
(Chile) A Fillol (Chile) J Fillol	6	6
(Argentina) G Aubone (Argentina) C Landó	3	4
4	(Argentina) R Cano (Chile) B Prajoux	7	6
(Argentina) A Gattiker (Argentina) C Gattiker	6	2
(Argentina) A Ganzábal (Argentina) G Guerrero	7	6
(Czechoslovakia) I Lendl (Italy) C Panatta	6	3
(West Germany) K Eberhard (West Germany) C Zipf	6	6
(Spain) Á Giménez (Spain) J Higueras	1	3
(Argentina) D Carruthers (Argentina) F Dalla Fontana	1	4
3	(Uruguay) JL Damiani (Ecuador) R Ycaza	6	6
(Uruguay) D Pérez (Argentina) G Tiberti	7	6	6
(Argentina) E Bengoechea (Spain) J López-Maeso	6	7	1
(Brazil) M Hocevar (Brazil) J Soares	6	3	6
2	(West Germany) R Gehring (United States) F Taygan	4	6	4

Quarterfinals
1	(Chile) H Gildemeister (Ecuador) A Gómez	6	6	3
(Chile) A Fillol (Chile) J Fillol	3	7	6
4	(Argentina) R Cano (Chile) B Prajoux	7	6
(Argentina) A Ganzábal (Argentina) G Guerrero	5	0
(West Germany) K Eberhard (West Germany) C Zipf	3	6
3	(Uruguay) JL Damiani (Ecuador) R Ycaza	6	7
(Uruguay) D Pérez (Argentina) G Tiberti	0	4
(Brazil) M Hocevar (Brazil) J Soares	6	6

Semifinals
(Chile) A Fillol (Chile) J Fillol	3	6	6
4	(Argentina) R Cano (Chile) B Prajoux	6	4	4
3	(Uruguay) JL Damiani (Ecuador) R Ycaza	6	6	4
(Brazil) M Hocevar (Brazil) J Soares	7	4	6

Final
(Chile) A Fillol (Chile) J Fillol	6	7	4
(Brazil) M Hocevar (Brazil) J Soares	7	6	6
