= 1981 South American Championships – Singles =

Singles
- 1981 South American Championships
- 1980 Champion: (Argentina) José Luis Clerc

Final
- Champion: (Czechoslovakia) Ivan Lendl
- Runner-up: (Argentina) Guillermo Vilas
- Score: 6–2, 6–2

Details
- Draw: 32
- Seeds: 8

Events
Singles	Doubles
← 1980 ·	South American Championships	· 1982 →

José Luis Clerc was the defending champion but did not compete that year.

Ivan Lendl won in the final 6–2, 6–2 against Guillermo Vilas.

== Seeds ==
A champion seed is indicated in bold text while text in italics indicates the round in which that seed was eliminated.

1. (Czechoslovakia) **Ivan Lendl (champion)**
2. (Argentina) Guillermo Vilas (final)
3. (Paraguay) Víctor Pecci (first round)
4. (Chile) Hans Gildemeister (second round)
5. (West Germany) Rolf Gehring (quarterfinals)
6. (Uruguay) Jose Luis Damiani (second round)
7. (Spain) José Higueras (second round)
8. (Ecuador) Andrés Gómez (quarterfinals)

== Draw ==
=== Key ===
- Q = Qualifier
- WC = Wild card
- LL = Lucky loser
- Alt = Alternate
- SE = Special exempt
- PR = Protected ranking
- ITF = ITF entry
- JE = Junior exempt
- w/o = Walkover
- r = Retired
- d = Defaulted
- SR = Special ranking

First round
1	(Czechoslovakia) **I Lendl**	**6**	**6**
(Spain) Á Giménez	3	4
(Spain) **M Orantes**	**6**	**6**
(Brazil) M Hocevar	2	3
(Uruguay) **D Pérez**	**6**	**6**
Q	(Uruguay) H Roverano	3	3
(Peru) P Arraya	2	5
6	(Uruguay) **J L Damiani**	**6**	**7**
3	(Paraguay) V Pecci	**7**	3	1
(Chile) **P Rebolledo**	5	**6**	**6**
(Ecuador) **R Ycaza**	**6**	**6**
(Argentina) E Bengoechea	4	4
(Spain) **J López-Maeso**	**6**	**7**
(Argentina) G Aubone	4	5
Q	(Chile) B Prajoux	1	2
8	(Ecuador) **A Gómez**	**6**	**6**
7	(Spain) **J Higueras**	**6**	3	**6**
(Spain) G Urpí	2	**6**	4
(West Germany) **A Maurer**	1	**6**	**7**
(West Germany) K Eberhard	**6**	1	5
(Spain) **J Aguilera**	**6**	**6**
(Brazil) J Soares	1	2
(Spain) F Luna	4	**7**	0
4	(Chile) **H Gildemeister**	**6**	6	**6**
5	(West Germany) **R Gehring**	1	**6**	**6**
(Belgium) B Boileau	**6**	3	4
(Chile) **J Fillol**	**6**	**6**
(Paraguay) F González	2	3
(Argentina) **R Argüello**	**6**	**6**
(Argentina) G Tiberti	2	3
(Argentina) R Cano	4	6
2	(Argentina) **G Vilas**	**6**	**7**

Second round
1	(Czechoslovakia) **I Lendl**	**6**	**6**
(Spain) M Orantes	4	0
(Uruguay) **D Pérez**	2	**6**	**6**
6	(Uruguay) J L Damiani	**6**	2	4
(Chile) **P Rebolledo**	**6**	**6**
(Ecuador) R Ycaza	1	1
(Spain) J López-Maeso	5	2
8	(Ecuador) **A Gómez**	**7**	**6**
7	(Spain) J Higueras	3	1
(West Germany) **A Maurer**	**6**	**6**
Q	(Spain) **J Aguilera**	2	**6**	**7**
4	(Chile) H Gildemeister	**6**	0	5
5	(West Germany) **R Gehring**	**7**	**7**
(Chile) J Fillol	6	6
(Argentina) R Argüello
2	(Argentina) **G Vilas**

Quarterfinals
1	(Czechoslovakia) **I Lendl**	**6**	**7**
(Uruguay) D Pérez	4	5
(Chile) **P Rebolledo**	**6**	**6**
8	(Ecuador) A Gómez	1	0
(West Germany) **A Maurer**	**7**	**6**
Q	(Spain) J Aguilera	5	1
5	(West Germany) R Gehring	**7**	5	5
2	(Argentina) **G Vilas**	5	**7**	**7**

Semifinals
1	(Czechoslovakia) **I Lendl**	**7**	**6**
(Chile) P Rebolledo	5	0
(West Germany) A Maurer	4	4
2	(Argentina) **G Vilas**	**6**	**6**

Final
1	(Czechoslovakia) **Ivan Lendl**	**6**	**6**
2	(Argentina) Guillermo Vilas	2	2
