= 1980 Bavarian Tennis Championships – Singles =

Singles
- 1980 Bavarian Tennis Championships

Final
- Champion: (West Germany) Rolf Gehring
- Runner-up: (France) Christophe Freyss
- Score: 6–2, 0–6, 6–2, 6–2

Details
- Draw: 32
- Seeds: 8

Events
Singles	Doubles
← 1979 ·	Bavarian Tennis Championships	· 1981 →

Manuel Orantes was the defending champion, but did not participate this year.

Rolf Gehring won the title, defeating Christophe Freyss 6–2, 0–6, 6–2, 6–2 in the final.

== Seeds ==
1. (Paraguay) Víctor Pecci (second round)
2. (Poland) Wojtek Fibak (first round)
3. (Switzerland) Markus Günthardt (second round)
4. (United States) Terry Moor (quarterfinals)
5. (Netherlands) Tom Okker (first round)
6. (West Germany) Rolf Gehring (champion)
7. (Brazil) Thomaz Koch (first round)
8. (New Zealand) Chris Lewis (second round)

== Draw ==
Key

- Q = Qualifier
- WC = Wild card
- LL = Lucky loser
- Alt = Alternate
- ITF = ITF entry
- PR = Protected ranking
- SR = Special ranking
- SE = Special exempt
- JE = Junior exempt
- JR = Junior Accelerator Programme entrant
- CO = College Accelerator Programme entrant
- NG = Next Gen Accelerator Program entrant
- w/o = Walkover
- r = Retired
- d = Defaulted

=== Final ===
Semifinals
6	(West Germany) Rolf Gehring	3	6	7
Q	(Sweden) Stefan Simonsson	6	3	6
Q	(West Germany) Klaus Eberhard	4	2
(France) Christophe Freyss	6	6

Final
6	(West Germany) Rolf Gehring	6	0	6	6
(France) Christophe Freyss	2	6	2	2

=== Section 1 ===
First round
1	(Paraguay) V Pecci	6	6
(United States) F Taygan	2	2
(Argentina) C Gattiker	3	3
(Czechoslovakia) P Složil	6	6
(Australia) D Carter	6	6
(Sweden) P Hjertquist	2	4
Q	(United States) T Garcia	3	4
6	(West Germany) R Gehring	6	6
3	(Switzerland) M Günthardt	3	7	6
(South Africa) R Moore	6	6	0
(United States) M Cahill	4	4
Q	(Sweden) S Simonsson	6	6
(Australia) T Rocavert	1	6	5
Q	(France) C Roger-Vasselin	6	4	7
(Czechoslovakia) J Kodeš	7	1	6
5	(Netherlands) T Okker	5	6	3

Second round
1	(Paraguay) V Pecci	7	4	4
(Czechoslovakia) P Složil	6	6	6
(Australia) D Carter	7	3	4
6	(West Germany) R Gehring	6	6	6
3	(Switzerland) M Günthardt	2	6	2
Q	(Sweden) S Simonsson	6	4	6
Q	(France) C Roger-Vasselin	6	5	6
(Czechoslovakia) J Kodeš	1	7	0

Quarterfinals
(Czechoslovakia) P Složil	6	4	1
6	(West Germany) R Gehring	3	6	6
Q	(Sweden) S Simonsson	2	7	7
Q	(France) C Roger-Vasselin	6	5	6

Semifinals
6	(West Germany) R Gehring	3	6	7
Q	(Sweden) S Simonsson	6	3	6

=== Section 2 ===
First round
8	(New Zealand) C Lewis	6	6
(West Germany) R Baumgartner	2	4
Q	(West Germany) K Eberhard	6	6
(South Africa) B Bertram	2	3
(Czechoslovakia) S Birner	4	6	6
(United States) S Krulevitz	6	0	3
(Colombia) J Velasco, Sr.	1	4
4	(United States) T Moor	6	6
7	(Brazil) T Koch	6	1	4
(West Germany) P Elter	4	6	6
(Socialist Federal Republic of Yugoslavia) Ž Franulović	6	6
(West Germany) K Meiler	3	2
(Chile) A Pierola	3	6	3
(France) C Freyss	6	4	6
(West Germany) C Zipf	1	6	6
2	(Poland) W Fibak	6	0	4

Second round
8	(New Zealand) C Lewis	4	1
Q	(West Germany) K Eberhard	6	6
(Czechoslovakia) S Birner	2	4
4	(United States) T Moor	6	6
(West Germany) P Elter	4	3
(Socialist Federal Republic of Yugoslavia) Ž Franulović	6	6
(France) C Freyss	7	6
(West Germany) C Zipf	6	3

Quarterfinals
Q	(West Germany) K Eberhard	6	6
4	(United States) T Moor	3	4
(Socialist Federal Republic of Yugoslavia) Ž Franulović	3	2
(France) C Freyss	6	6

Semifinals
Q	(West Germany) K Eberhard	4	2
(France) C Freyss	6	6
