= 1982 Bavarian Tennis Championships – Doubles =

Tennis tournament

Doubles
- 1982 Bavarian Tennis Championships

Final
- Champions: (United States) Chip Hooper (United States) Mel Purcell
- Runners-up: (South Africa) Tian Viljoen (South Africa) Danie Visser
- Score: 6–4, 7–6

Events
Singles	Doubles
← 1981 ·	Bavarian Tennis Championships	· 1983 →

David Carter and Paul Kronk were the defending champions, but Kronk did not participate this year. Carter partnered Chris Lewis, losing in the first round.

Chip Hooper and Mel Purcell won the title, defeating Tian Viljoen and Danie Visser 6–4, 7–6 in the final.

== Seeds ==
1. (United States) Pat Du Pré / (United States) Terry Moor (second round, defaulted)
2. (Australia) David Carter / (New Zealand) Chris Lewis (first round)
3. (Brazil) Marcos Hocevar / (Brazil) João Soares (second round)
4. (Israel) Shlomo Glickstein / (Israel) Steve Krulevitz (second round)

== Draw ==
Key

- Q = Qualifier
- WC = Wild card
- LL = Lucky loser
- Alt = Alternate
- ITF = ITF entry
- PR = Protected ranking
- SR = Special ranking
- SE = Special exempt
- JE = Junior exempt
- JR = Junior Accelerator Programme entrant
- CO = College Accelerator Programme entrant
- NG = Next Gen Accelerator Program entrant
- w/o = Walkover
- r = Retired
- d = Defaulted

=== Draw ===
First round
1	(United States) P Du Pré (United States) T Moor	6	7
(Colombia) A Cortes (Spain) J López-Maeso	3	6
(West Germany) U Fischer (Socialist Federal Republic of Yugoslavia) Mijuca Miodrac	6	6
(Spain) Á Giménez (Colombia) J Velasco Sr.	4	3
4	(Israel) S Glickstein (Israel) S Krulevitz	6	6
(Czechoslovakia) S Birner (France) C Roger-Vasselin	3	4
(South Africa) T Viljoen (South Africa) D Visser	7	6
(New Zealand) B Derlin (Czechoslovakia) J Granát	6	4
(United States) C Hooper (United States) M Purcell	7	4	6
(South Africa) E Edwards (Zimbabwe) H Ismail	6	6	3
3	(Brazil) R Hocevar (Brazil) J Soares	7	7
(South Africa) R Moore (South Africa) Marcel van der Merwe	6	5
(West Germany) H-D Beutel (West Germany) C Zipf	6	6
(Australia) J Frawley (West Germany) K Meiler	4	4
(West Germany) K Eberhard (West Germany) W Popp	7	1	6
2	(Australia) D Carter (New Zealand) C Lewis	6	6	4

Quarterfinals
1	(United States) P Du Pré (United States) T Moor
(West Germany) U Fischer (Socialist Federal Republic of Yugoslavia) M Miodrac	DEF
4	(Israel) S Glickstein (Israel) S Krulevitz	6	6	5
(South Africa) T Viljoen (South Africa) D Visser	4	7	7
(United States) C Hooper (United States) M Purcell	7	6
3	(Brazil) R Hocevar (Brazil) J Soares	5	1
(West Germany) H-D Beutel (West Germany) C Zipf	6	2	1
(West Germany) K Eberhard (West Germany) W Popp	3	6	6

Semifinals
(West Germany) U Fischer (Socialist Federal Republic of Yugoslavia) M Miodrac	2	5
(South Africa) T Viljoen (South Africa) D Visser	6	7
(United States) C Hooper (United States) M Purcell	6	6	6
(West Germany) K Eberhard (West Germany) W Popp	4	7	2

Final
(South Africa) T Viljoen (South Africa) D Visser	4	6
(United States) C Hooper (United States) M Purcell	6	7
