= 1981 Bavarian Tennis Championships – Doubles =

Doubles
- 1981 Bavarian Tennis Championships

Final
- Champions: (Australia) David Carter (Australia) Paul Kronk
- Runners-up: (United States) Eric Fromm (Israel) Shlomo Glickstein
- Score: 6–3, 6–4

Events
Singles	Doubles
← 1980 ·	Bavarian Tennis Championships	· 1982 →

Heinz Günthardt and Bob Hewitt were the defending champions, but did not participate this year.

David Carter and Paul Kronk won the title, defeating Eric Fromm and Shlomo Glickstein 6–3, 6–4 in the final.

== Seeds ==
1. (Zimbabwe) Andrew Pattison / (United States) Butch Walts (quarterfinals)
2. (United States) Steve Denton / (South Africa) Eddie Edwards (quarterfinals)
3. (Australia) Rod Frawley / (New Zealand) Chris Lewis (semifinals)
4. (Australia) David Carter / (Australia) Paul Kronk (champions)

== Draw ==
Key

- Q = Qualifier
- WC = Wild card
- LL = Lucky loser
- Alt = Alternate
- ITF = ITF entry
- PR = Protected ranking
- SR = Special ranking
- SE = Special exempt
- JE = Junior exempt
- JR = Junior Accelerator Programme entrant
- CO = College Accelerator Programme entrant
- NG = Next Gen Accelerator Program entrant
- w/o = Walkover
- r = Retired
- d = Defaulted

=== Draw ===
First round
1	(Zimbabwe) A Pattison (United States) B Walts	7	6
(West Germany) H-D Beutel (West Germany) C Zipf	6	3
(West Germany) R Gehring (United States) E Teltscher	6	6
(United States) Brad Coleman (South Africa) Gordon Simmonds	3	2
4	(Australia) D Carter (Australia) P Kronk	6	6
(Argentina) Alejandro Cerundolo (Argentina) T Stålhandske	3	2
(Sweden) A Järryd (Sweden) J Norbäck	6	6
(Spain) Luis Bruguera (Spain) F Luna	2	2
(South Africa) R Moore (France) G Moretton	6	6
(West Germany) Gunther Gnettner (West Germany) Uli Heyne	2	2
3	(Australia) R Frawley (New Zealand) C Lewis	6	6
(France) D Bedel (France) C Roger-Vasselin	3	1
(United States) E Fromm (Israel) S Glickstein	6	6
(Austria) F Krajcik (Argentina) JC Yunis	2	3
(West Germany) K Eberhard (Sweden) P Hjertquist	2	7	4
2	(United States) S Denton (South Africa) E Edwards	6	6	6

Quarterfinals
1	(Zimbabwe) A Pattison (United States) B Walts	6	6	5
(West Germany) R Gehring (United States) E Teltscher	4	7	7
4	(Australia) D Carter (Australia) P Kronk	w/o
(Sweden) A Järryd (Sweden) J Norbäck
(South Africa) R Moore (France) G Moretton	1	5
3	(Australia) R Frawley (New Zealand) C Lewis	6	7
(United States) E Fromm (Israel) S Glickstein	3	6	7
2	(United States) S Denton (South Africa) E Edwards	6	1	5

Semifinals
(West Germany) R Gehring (United States) E Teltscher	4	0
4	(Australia) D Carter (Australia) P Kronk	6	6
3	(Australia) R Frawley (New Zealand) C Lewis	4	6
(United States) E Fromm (Israel) S Glickstein	6	7

Final
4	(Australia) D Carter (Australia) P Kronk	6	6
(United States) E Fromm (Israel) S Glickstein	3	4
