= 1978 Swiss Indoors – Doubles =

Doubles
- 1978 Swiss Indoors

Final
- Champion: (Poland) Wojciech Fibak (United States) John McEnroe
- Runner-up: (United States) Bruce Manson (Rhodesia) Andrew Pattison
- Score: 7–6, 7–5

Details
- Draw: 16
- Seeds: 4

Events
Singles	Doubles
← 1977 ·	Swiss Indoors	· 1979 →

The 1978 Swiss Indoors – Doubles was an event of the 1978 Swiss Indoors tennis tournament and was played on indoor hard courts at the St. Jakobshalle in Basel, Switzerland, between 24 October and 29 October 1978. The draw consisted of 16 teams and four of them were seeded. Mark Cox and Buster Mottram were the defending Swiss Indoors doubles champions but did not participate in this edition. The first-seeded team of Wojciech Fibak and John McEnroe won the doubles title after a win in the final against unseeded pairing Bruce Manson and Andrew Pattison, 7–6, 7–5.

== Seeds ==
1. (Poland) Wojciech Fibak / (United States) John McEnroe (champions)
2. (Romania) Ion Țiriac / (Argentina) Guillermo Vilas (semifinals)
3. (India) Anand Amritraj / (South Africa) Raymond Moore (quarterfinals)
4. (United Kingdom) Colin Dowdeswell / (Switzerland) Heinz Günthardt (semifinals)

== Draw ==
=== Key ===
- Q = Qualifier
- WC = Wild card
- LL = Lucky loser
- Alt = Alternate
- ITF = ITF entry
- PR = Protected ranking
- SR = Special ranking
- SE = Special exempt
- JE = Junior exempt
- JR = Junior Accelerator Programme entrant
- CO = College Accelerator Programme entrant
- NG = Next Gen Accelerator Program entrant
- w/o = Walkover
- r = Retired
- d = Defaulted

First Round
1	(Poland) Wojciech Fibak (United States) John McEnroe	6	6
(Germany) Rolf Gehring (Germany) Ulrich Pinner	3	4
(France) Bernard Fritz (Sweden) Jan Norbäck	1	2
(India) Vijay Amritraj (India) Ashok Amritraj	6	6
(United States) Victor Amaya (United States) Dick R. Bohrnstedt	6	3	7
(Czech Republic) Jiří Hřebec (Czech Republic) Vladimír Zedník	2	6	6
(France) Patrice Dominguez (United States) David Schneider	2	2
4	(United Kingdom) Colin Dowdeswell (Switzerland) Heinz Günthardt	6	6
3	(India) Anand Amritraj (South Africa) Raymond Moore	6	2	6
(Italy) Gianni Ocleppo (France) Christophe Roger-Vasselin	3	6	4
(United States) Bruce Manson (Rhodesia) Andrew Pattison	6	6	6
(United Kingdom) John Lloyd (United Kingdom) David Lloyd	3	7	3
(Switzerland) Markus Günthardt (Switzerland) Renato Schmitz	4	7	1
(Egypt) Ismail El Shafei (United States) Trey Waltke	6	6	6
(Spain) Ángel Giménez (Spain) Fernando Soler	3	2
2	(Romania) Ion Țiriac (Argentina) Guillermo Vilas	6	6

Quarterfinals
1	(Poland) Wojciech Fibak (United States) John McEnroe	7	6
(India) Vijay Amritraj (India) Ashok Amritraj	6	4
(United States) Victor Amaya (United States) Dick R. Bohrnstedt	6	3
4	(United Kingdom) Colin Dowdeswell (Switzerland) Heinz Günthardt	7	6
3	(India) Anand Amritraj (South Africa) Raymond Moore	5	6
(United States) Bruce Manson (Rhodesia) Andrew Pattison	7	7
(Egypt) Ismail El Shafei (United States) Trey Waltke	2	6
2	(Romania) Ion Țiriac (Argentina) Guillermo Vilas	6	7

Semifinals
1	(Poland) Wojciech Fibak (United States) John McEnroe	6	4	6
4	(United Kingdom) Colin Dowdeswell (Switzerland) Heinz Günthardt	4	6	4
(United States) Bruce Manson (Rhodesia) Andrew Pattison	2	7	6
2	(Romania) Ion Țiriac (Argentina) Guillermo Vilas	6	6	4

Final
1	(Poland) Wojciech Fibak (United States) John McEnroe	7	7
(United States) Bruce Manson (Rhodesia) Andrew Pattison	6	5
