= 1978 Swiss Indoors – Singles =

Singles
- 1978 Swiss Indoors

Final
- Champion: (Argentina) Guillermo Vilas
- Runner-up: (United States) John McEnroe
- Score: 6–3, 5–7, 7–5, 6–4

Details
- Draw: 32
- Seeds: 8

Events
Singles	Doubles
← 1977 ·	Swiss Indoors	· 1979 →

The 1978 Swiss Indoors – Singles was an event of the 1978 Swiss Indoors tennis tournament and was played on indoor hard courts at the St. Jakobshalle in Basel, Switzerland, between 24 October and 29 October 1978. The draw comprised 32 players and eight of them were seeded. Björn Borg was the defending Swiss Indoors singles champion but did not participate in this edition. First-seeded Guillermo Vilas won the singles title after a win in the final against second-seeded John McEnroe, 6–3, 5–7, 7–5, 6–4.

== Seeds ==
1. (Argentina) Guillermo Vilas (champion)
2. (United States) John McEnroe (final)
3. (Poland) Wojciech Fibak (semifinals)
4. (United Kingdom) John Lloyd (first round)
5. (United States) Victor Amaya (semifinals)
6. (India) Vijay Amritraj (second round)
7. (Czech Republic) Vladimír Zedník (first round)
8. (Germany) Ulrich Pinner (quarterfinals)

== Draw ==
=== Key ===
- Q = Qualifier
- WC = Wild card
- LL = Lucky loser
- Alt = Alternate
- ITF = ITF entry
- PR = Protected ranking
- SR = Special ranking
- SE = Special exempt
- JE = Junior exempt
- JR = Junior Accelerator Programme entrant
- CO = College Accelerator Programme entrant
- NG = Next Gen Accelerator Program entrant
- w/o = Walkover
- r = Retired
- d = Defaulted

=== Finals ===
Semifinals
1	(Argentina) Guillermo Vilas	6	6
3	(Poland) Wojciech Fibak	3	0
5	(United States) Victor Amaya	3	2
2	(United States) John McEnroe	6	6

Final
1	(Argentina) Guillermo Vilas	6	5	7
2	(United States) John McEnroe	3	7	5

=== Top half ===
First Round
1	(Argentina) Guillermo Vilas	6	6
(Switzerland) Ivan Dupasquier	1	2
(Netherlands) Louk Sanders	6	7
(United States) Trey Waltke	4	5
(India) Anand Amritraj	4	4
Q	(Germany) Rolf Gehring	6	6
Q	(United Kingdom) Rohun Beven	4	3
6	(India) Vijay Amritraj	6	6
3	(Poland) Wojciech Fibak	7	7
Q	(Netherlands) Paul van Min	5	5
(United Kingdom) Mark Cox	7	6
(United Kingdom) Colin Dowdeswell	6	3
(Spain) Ángel Giménez	6	6
Q	(United States) David Schneider	3	2
(United States) Dick R. Bohrnstedt	5	4
8	(Germany) Ulrich Pinner	7	6

Second Round
1	(Argentina) Guillermo Vilas	6	3	6
(Netherlands) Louk Sanders	2	6	3
Q	(Germany) Rolf Gehring	3	6	7
6	(India) Vijay Amritraj	6	1	5
3	(Poland) Wojciech Fibak	6	6
(United Kingdom) Mark Cox	2	3
(Spain) Ángel Giménez	6	2	3
8	(Germany) Ulrich Pinner	2	6	6

Quarterfinals
1	(Argentina) Guillermo Vilas	6	6	7
Q	(Germany) Rolf Gehring	2	7	6
3	(Poland) Wojciech Fibak	6	6
8	(Germany) Ulrich Pinner	4	3

Semifinals
1	(Argentina) Guillermo Vilas	6	6
3	(Poland) Wojciech Fibak	3	0

=== Bottom half ===
First Round
5	(United States) Victor Amaya	6	6
(Switzerland) Markus Günthardt	2	3
(Romania) Ion Țiriac	4	3
(Italy) Gianni Ocleppo	6	6
(Czech Republic) Jiří Hřebec	6	2
(Egypt) Ismail El Shafei	7	6
(South Africa) Raymond Moore	6	6
4	(United Kingdom) John Lloyd	3	3
7	(Czech Republic) Vladimír Zedník	3	7	6
(France) Patrice Dominguez	6	6	7
(Switzerland) Heinz Günthardt	6	6
(Spain) Javier Soler	2	0
(France) Bernard Fritz	6	6
(Zimbabwe) Andrew Pattison	4	4
(United States) Bruce Manson	2	2
2	(United States) John McEnroe	6	6

Second Round
5	(United States) Victor Amaya	6	6
(Italy) Gianni Ocleppo	1	2
(Egypt) Ismail El Shafei	6	4	6
(South Africa) Raymond Moore	3	6	7
(France) Patrice Dominguez	6	6	3
(Switzerland) Heinz Günthardt	1	7	6
(France) Bernard Fritz	3	2
2	(United States) John McEnroe	6	6

Quarterfinals
5	(United States) Victor Amaya	6	6
(South Africa) Raymond Moore	4	2
(Switzerland) Heinz Günthardt	6	3	0
2	(United States) John McEnroe	4	6	6

Semifinals
5	(United States) Victor Amaya	3	2
2	(United States) John McEnroe	6	6
