= 1980 Bavarian Tennis Championships – Doubles =

Doubles
- 1980 Bavarian Tennis Championships

Final
- Champions: (Switzerland) Heinz Günthardt (South Africa) Bob Hewitt
- Runners-up: (Australia) David Carter (New Zealand) Chris Lewis
- Score: 7–6, 6–1

Details
- Draw: 16
- Seeds: 4

Events
Singles	Doubles
- Bavarian Tennis Championships

Wojtek Fibak and Tom Okker were the defending champions, but lost in the first round this year.

Heinz Günthardt and Bob Hewitt won the title, defeating David Carter and Chris Lewis 7–6, 6–1 in the final.

== Seeds ==
1. (Switzerland) Heinz Günthardt / (South Africa) Bob Hewitt (champions)
2. (Poland) Wojtek Fibak / (Netherlands) Tom Okker (first round)
3. (Socialist Federal Republic of Yugoslavia) Željko Franulović / (Czechoslovakia) Jan Kodeš (first round)
4. (West Germany) Jürgen Fassbender / (Czechoslovakia) Pavel Složil (quarterfinals)

== Draw ==
Key

- Q = Qualifier
- WC = Wild card
- LL = Lucky loser
- Alt = Alternate
- ITF = ITF entry
- PR = Protected ranking
- SR = Special ranking
- SE = Special exempt
- JE = Junior exempt
- JR = Junior Accelerator Programme entrant
- CO = College Accelerator Programme entrant
- NG = Next Gen Accelerator Program entrant
- w/o = Walkover
- r = Retired
- d = Defaulted

=== Draw ===
First round
1	(Switzerland) H Günthardt (South Africa) B Hewitt	6	6
(United States) I Harris (United States) T Moor	2	4
(West Germany) R Gehring (West Germany) K Meiler	6	6
(West Germany) Thomas Furst (Australia) B Phillips-Moore	3	3
4	(West Germany) J Fassbender (Czechoslovakia) P Složil	4	6	6
(Brazil) T Koch (Colombia) J Velasco Sr.	6	3	3
(Argentina) C Gattiker (Chile) A Pierola	6	1	1
(Czechoslovakia) S Birner (Australia) T Rocavert	4	6	6
(West Germany) R Probst (West Germany) M Wünschig	6	4	4
(Australia) D Carter (New Zealand) C Lewis	0	6	6
(South Africa) R Moore (United States) F Taygan	6	6
3	(Socialist Federal Republic of Yugoslavia) Ž Franulović (Czechoslovakia) J Kodeš	3	2
(France) C Freyss (France) C Roger-Vasselin	6	7	7
(South Africa) B Bertram (United States) S Carnahan	7	6	5
(West Germany) K Eberhard (West Germany) P Elter	5	6	6
2	(Poland) W Fibak (Netherlands) T Okker	7	2	4

Quarterfinals
1	(Switzerland) H Günthardt (South Africa) B Hewitt	7	6
(West Germany) R Gehring (West Germany) K Meiler	6	2
4	(West Germany) J Fassbender (Czechoslovakia) P Složil	2	7	3
(Czechoslovakia) S Birner (Australia) T Rocavert	6	5	6
(Australia) D Carter (New Zealand) C Lewis	6	7
(South Africa) R Moore (United States) F Taygan	3	5
(France) C Freyss (France) C Roger-Vasselin	6	7
(West Germany) K Eberhard (West Germany) P Elter	2	5

Semifinals
1	(Switzerland) H Günthardt (South Africa) B Hewitt	6	6	6
(Czechoslovakia) S Birner (Australia) T Rocavert	3	7	2
(Australia) D Carter (New Zealand) C Lewis	6	6
(France) C Freyss (France) C Roger-Vasselin	2	3

Final
1	(Switzerland) H Günthardt (South Africa) B Hewitt	7	6
(Australia) D Carter (New Zealand) C Lewis	6	1
