= 1981 French Open – Mixed doubles =

Mixed doubles
- 1981 French Open

Final
- Champion: (United States) Andrea Jaeger (United States) Jimmy Arias
- Runner-up: (Netherlands) Betty Stöve (United States) Fred McNair
- Score: 7–6, 6–4

Details
- Draw: 32

Events
Singles	men	women		boys	girls
Doubles	men	women	mixed	boys	girls
WC Singles	men	women	quad
WC Doubles	men	women	quad
Legends	−45	45+	women
- French Open

The mixed doubles tournament at the 1981 French Open was held from 25 May to 7 June 1981 on the outdoor clay courts at the Stade Roland Garros in Paris, France. Jimmy Arias and Andrea Jaeger won the title, defeating Fred McNair and Betty Stöve in the final.

== Draw ==
Key

- Q = Qualifier
- WC = Wild card
- LL = Lucky loser
- Alt = Alternate
- ITF = ITF entry
- PR = Protected ranking
- SR = Special ranking
- SE = Special exempt
- JE = Junior exempt
- JR = Junior Accelerator Programme entrant
- CO = College Accelerator Programme entrant
- NG = Next Gen Accelerator Program entrant
- w/o = Walkover
- r = Retired
- d = Defaulted

=== Finals ===
Semifinals
8	(United States) Andrea Jaeger (United States) Jimmy Arias	4	6	11
5	(United States) Pam Teeguarden (Paraguay) Francisco González	6	3	9
6	(United States) Kathy Horvath (Ecuador) Andrés Gómez	3	3
2	(Netherlands) Betty Stöve (United States) Fred McNair	6	6

Final
8	(United States) Andrea Jaeger (United States) Jimmy Arias	7	6
2	(Netherlands) Betty Stöve (United States) Fred McNair	6	4

=== Top half ===
First round
1	(United States) B J King (Romania) I Năstase	7	6
(Romania) L Romanov (Israel) S Krulevitz	5	4
(France) G L Benedetti (France) D Naegelen	6	5	2
(West Germany) E Pfaff (United States) R Fagel	3	7	6
8	(United States) A Jaeger (United States) J Arias	6	7
(United States) K Sands (United States) B Nichols	3	5
(United States) P Casale (United States) C Wittus	1	6	1
(United States) L Forood (United States) E Fromm	6	3	6
4	(United States) B Nagelsen (Ecuador) R Ycaza	3	6	6
(United States) P Johnson (Zimbabwe) H Ismail	6	2	3
(United States) L Allen (United States) M Hunter	3	6
(United States) J Goodling (South Africa) J Yuill	6	7
5	(United States) P Teeguarden (Paraguay) F Gonzalez	6	6
(Argentina) I Madruga (Uruguay) J L Damiani	3	2
(Hungary) A Temesvari (Bolivia) M Martinez	4	6	6
(Switzerland) L Siegel (Switzerland) M Günthardt	6	3	8

Second round
1	(United States) B J King (Romania) I Năstase	4	6	4
(West Germany) E Pfaff (United States) R Fagel	6	3	6
8	(United States) A Jaeger (United States) J Arias	6	7
(United States) R Blount (United States) E Fromm	4	5
4	(United States) B Nagelsen (Ecuador) R Ycaza	6	6
(United States) J Goodling (South Africa) J Yuill	4	2
5	(United States) P Teeguarden (Paraguay) F Gonzalez	6	6
(Switzerland) L Siegel (Switzerland) M Günthardt	2	3

Quarterfinals
(West Germany) E Pfaff (United States) R Fagel	3	2
8	(United States) A Jaeger (United States) J Arias	6	6
4	(United States) B Nagelsen (Ecuador) R Ycaza	4	6
5	(United States) P Teeguarden (Paraguay) F Gonzalez	6	7

Semifinals
8	(United States) A Jaeger (United States) J Arias	4	6	11
5	(United States) P Teeguarden (Paraguay) F Gonzalez	6	3	9

=== Bottom half ===
First round
(France) S Provoust (Brazil) M Hocevar	6	6	3
(France) D Beillan (France) P Proisy	7	4	6
(Poland) I Kuczyńska (France) P Kuchna	4	1
6	(United States) K Horvath (Ecuador) A Gómez	6	6
(United States) C Reynolds (United States) T Delatte	2	0
(United States) K White (United States) R Van't Hof	6	6
(United Kingdom) G Coles (United Kingdom) S Alger	2	2
3	(United States) A Smith (United States) S Denton	6	6
(Argentina) L Giussani (Argentina) E Giussani	3	1
(South Africa) I Kloss (Chile) Á Fillol	6	6
(United States) A Buchanan (United States) C Leeds	4	4
7	(Brazil) C Monteiro (Brazil) C Kirmayr	6	6
(Argentina) C Casabianca (Argentina) C Gattiker	4	1
(Australia) A Minter (Australia) J Fitzgerald	6	6
(Peru) P Vasquez (Peru) F Maynetto	4	3
2	(Netherlands) B Stöve (United States) F McNair	6	6

Second round
(France) D Beillan (France) P Proisy	6	3	2
6	(United States) K Horvath (Ecuador) A Gómez	2	6	6
(United States) K White (United States) R Van't Hof	3	3
3	(United States) A Smith (United States) S Denton	6	6
(South Africa) I Kloss (Chile) Á Fillol	6	6
7	(Brazil) C Monteiro (Brazil) C Kirmayr	3	3
(Australia) A Minter (Australia) J Fitzgerald	7	4	5
2	(Netherlands) B Stöve (United States) F McNair	5	6	7

Quarterfinals
6	(United States) K Horvath (Ecuador) A Gómez	7	6
3	(United States) A Smith (United States) S Denton	6	3
(South Africa) I Kloss (Chile) Á Fillol	6	6	1
2	(Netherlands) B Stöve (United States) F McNair	7	2	6

Semifinals
6	(United States) K Horvath (Ecuador) A Gómez	3	3
2	(Netherlands) B Stöve (United States) F McNair	6	6
