= 1981 Bavarian Tennis Championships – Singles =

Singles
- 1981 Bavarian Tennis Championships

Final
- Champion: (New Zealand) Chris Lewis
- Runner-up: (France) Christophe Roger-Vasselin
- Score: 4–6, 6–2, 2–6, 6–1, 6–1

Details
- Draw: 32
- Seeds: 8

Events
Singles	Doubles
← 1980 ·	Bavarian Tennis Championships	· 1982 →

Rolf Gehring was the defending champion, but lost in the semifinals this year.

Chris Lewis won the title, defeating Christophe Roger-Vasselin 4–6, 6–2, 2–6, 6–1, 6–1 in the final.

== Seeds ==
1. (United States) Eliot Teltscher (second round)
2. (West Germany) Rolf Gehring (semifinals)
3. (Israel) Shlomo Glickstein (quarterfinals)
4. (New Zealand) Chris Lewis (champion)
5. (United States) Butch Walts (quarterfinals)
6. (Czechoslovakia) Pavel Složil (quarterfinals)
7. (France) Christophe Roger-Vasselin (final)
8. (West Germany) Ulrich Pinner (semifinals)

== Draw ==
Key

- Q = Qualifier
- WC = Wild card
- LL = Lucky loser
- Alt = Alternate
- ITF = ITF entry
- PR = Protected ranking
- SR = Special ranking
- SE = Special exempt
- JE = Junior exempt
- JR = Junior Accelerator Programme entrant
- CO = College Accelerator Programme entrant
- NG = Next Gen Accelerator Program entrant
- w/o = Walkover
- r = Retired
- d = Defaulted

=== Final ===
Semifinals
8	(West Germany) Ulrich Pinner	1	1
4	(New Zealand) Chris Lewis	6	6
7	(France) Christophe Roger-Vasselin	6	7
2	(West Germany) Rolf Gehring	4	6

Final
4	(New Zealand) Chris Lewis	4	6	2	6	6
7	(France) Christophe Roger-Vasselin	6	2	6	1	1

=== Section 1 ===
First round
1	(United States) E Teltscher	1	6	6
(Australia) P Kronk	6	4	4
(West Germany) H-D Beutel	6	2	3
(Spain) F Luna	4	6	6
(South Africa) D Schneider	6	6
(South Africa) R Moore	2	3
(Sweden) P Hjertquist	1	5
8	(West Germany) U Pinner	6	7
4	(New Zealand) C Lewis	6	6
(Sweden) J Norbäck	3	2
(West Germany) K Eberhard	6	5	6
(Sweden) A Järryd	4	7	1
(West Germany) C Zipf	1	6	0
(France) G Moretton	6	4	6
(Australia) R Frawley	3	0
6	(Czechoslovakia) P Složil	6	6

Second round
1	(United States) E Teltscher	5	1
(Spain) F Luna	7	6
(South Africa) D Schneider	4	2
8	(West Germany) U Pinner	6	6
4	(New Zealand) C Lewis	6	7
(West Germany) K Eberhard	4	6
(France) G Moretton	3	5
6	(Czechoslovakia) P Složil	6	7

Quarterfinals
(Spain) F Luna	6	6	3
8	(West Germany) U Pinner	3	7	6
4	(New Zealand) C Lewis	3	7	7
6	(Czechoslovakia) P Složil	6	5	6

Semifinals
8	(West Germany) U Pinner	1	1
4	(New Zealand) C Lewis	6	6

=== Section 2 ===
First round
7	(France) C Roger-Vasselin	6	6
(West Germany) G Gnettner	2	2
(France) C Freyss	6	7
(France) D Bedel	2	6
(New Zealand) O Parun	6	1
(United States) E Fromm	7	6
(United States) C Mayotte	4	6
3	(Israel) S Glickstein	6	7
5	(United States) B Walts	6	6
(South Africa) E Edwards	1	2
(United States) S Denton	6	7
(France) D Naegelen	0	6
(United States) A Pattison	2	1
(Austria) P Feigl	6	6
(West Germany) H Schwaier	2	4
2	(West Germany) R Gehring	6	6

Second round
7	(France) C Roger-Vasselin	6	6
(France) C Freyss	2	3
(United States) E Fromm	4	5
3	(Israel) S Glickstein	6	7
5	(United States) B Walts	6	6
(United States) S Denton	4	4
(Austria) P Feigl	3	3
2	(West Germany) R Gehring	6	6

Quarterfinals
7	(France) C Roger-Vasselin	7	7
3	(Israel) S Glickstein	6	5
5	(United States) B Walts	4	2
2	(West Germany) R Gehring	6	6

Semifinals
7	(France) C Roger-Vasselin	6	7
2	(West Germany) R Gehring	4	6
