= 1980 Bavarian Tennis Championships =

- Date: 20–25 May
- Edition: 64th
- Category: Grand Prix circuit
- Draw: 32S / 16D
- Prize money: $75,000
- Surface: Clay / outdoor
- Location: Munich, West Germany
- Venue: MTTC Iphitos

Champions

Singles
- (West Germany) Rolf Gehring

Doubles
- (Switzerland) Heinz Günthardt / (South Africa) Bob Hewitt
- Bavarian Tennis Championships

The 1980 Bavarian Tennis Championships was a men's Grand Prix tennis circuit tournament played on outdoor clay courts at the MTTC Iphitos in Munich, West Germany. It was the 64th edition of the tournament and was held from 20 May through 25 May 1980. Rolf Gehring won the singles title.

== Finals ==
=== Singles ===
(West Germany) Rolf Gehring defeated (France) Christophe Freyss 6–2, 0–6, 6–2, 6–2

- It was Gehring's only title of the year and the 1st of his career.

=== Doubles ===
(Switzerland) Heinz Günthardt / (South Africa) Bob Hewitt defeated (Australia) David Carter / (New Zealand) Chris Lewis 7–6, 6–1

- It was Günthardt's 4th title of the year and the 8th of his career. It was Hewitt's 1st title of the year and the 57th of his career.
