= 1981 South American Championships (tennis) =

- Date: 16–22 November
- Edition: 15th
- Category: Grand Prix circuit (Super Series)
- Draw: 32S / 16D
- Prize money: $175,000
- Surface: Clay / outdoor
- Location: Buenos Aires, Argentina

Champions

Singles
- (Czechoslovakia) Ivan Lendl

Doubles
- (Brazil) Marcos Hocevar / (Brazil) João Soares
← 1980 ·	South American Championships	· 1982 →

The 1981 South American Championships was a men's tennis tournament held in Buenos Aires, Argentina. It was the 15th edition of the tournament and was played on outdoor clay courts. The tournament was part of the 1981 Volvo Grand Prix and started was held from 16 November until 22 November 1981. First-seeded Ivan Lendl won the singles title.

== Finals ==
=== Singles ===
(Czechoslovakia) Ivan Lendl defeated (Argentina) Guillermo Vilas 6–2, 6–2

- It was Lendl's 9th title of the year and the 18th of his career.

=== Doubles ===
(Brazil) Marcos Hocevar / (Brazil) João Soares defeated (Chile) Álvaro Fillol / (Chile) Jaime Fillol 7–6, 6–7, 6–4

- It was Hocevar's only title of the year and the 1st of his career. It was Soares' only title of the year and the 1st of his career.
