= 1982 Grand Prix la Serenisima – Singles =

Singles
- 1982 Grand Prix la Serenisima
- 1981 Champion: (Czechoslovakia) Ivan Lendl

Final
- Champion: (Argentina) José Luis Clerc
- Runner-up: (Argentina) Alejandro Ganzábal
- Score: 6–2, 6–4

Details
- Draw: 32
- Seeds: 8

Events
Singles	Doubles
← 1981 ·	ATP Buenos Aires	· 1983 →

Guillermo Vilas defeated Alejandro Ganzábal 6–2, 6–4 to win the 1982 Grand Prix la Serenisima singles competition. Ivan Lendl was the champion but did not defend his title.

== Seeds ==
A champion seed is indicated in bold text while text in italics indicates the round in which that seed was eliminated.

1. (Argentina) Guillermo Vilas (champion)
2. (Paraguay) Víctor Pecci Sr. (second round)
3. (Chile) Pedro Rebolledo (first round)
4. (Spain) Manuel Orantes (second round)
5. (Argentina) Ricardo Cano (first round)
6. (Peru) Pablo Arraya (second round)
7. (Spain) Ángel Giménez (first round)
8. (Uruguay) Diego Pérez (semifinals)

== Draw ==
=== Key ===
- Q – Qualifier
- R – Retired

First Round
1	(Argentina) **G Vilas**	**6**	**6**
(Argentina) G Tiberti	0	4
(Argentina) R Argüello	3	3
(Argentina) **G Aubone**	**6**	**6**
(Austria) H-P Kandler	3	0
(Italy) **A Zugarelli**	**6**	**6**
(Hungary) **Z Kuhárszky**	**6**	**6**
5	(Argentina) R Cano	1	4
3	(Chile) P Rebolledo	1	5
(Argentina) **G Auroux**	**6**	**7**
(Romania) **F Segarceanu**	3	**7**	**6**
(Argentina) E Bengoechea	**6**	6	1
Q	(Argentina) R Rivera	3	6
(Sweden) **K Johansson**	**6**	**7**
(France) C Roger-Vasselin	3	**6**	3
8	(Uruguay) **D Pérez**	**6**	3	**6**
6	(Peru) **P Arraya**	6	**7**	**6**
(Sweden) S Simonsson	**7**	5	1
(Chile) **B Prajoux**	**6**	**6**
(Spain) E Osta	4	4
(Argentina) **A Ganzábal**	**6**	**6**
(West Germany) D Keretić	3	3
(Switzerland) I Dupasquier	3	4
4	(Spain) **M Orantes**	**6**	**6**
7	(Spain) Á Giménez	4	4
(France) **P Torre**	**6**	**6**
Q	(Argentina) L Soriano	3	**7**	5
(South Africa) **F Sauer**	**6**	6	**7**
(Italy) C Panatta	2	6
(Austria) **P Feigl**	**6**	**7**
(Argentina) C Castellan	2	**6**	2
2	(Paraguay) **V Pecci Sr.**	**6**	4	**6**

Second Round
1	(Argentina) **G Vilas**	**6**	**6**
(Argentina) G Aubone	0	4
(Italy) A Zugarelli	3	2
(Hungary) **Z Kuhárszky**	**6**	**6**
(Argentina) G Auroux	3	1
(Romania) **F Segarceanu**	**6**	**6**
(Sweden) K Johansson	5	2
8	(Uruguay) **D Pérez**	**7**	**6**
6	(Peru) P Arraya	3	0
(Chile) **B Prajoux**	**6**	**6**
(Argentina) **A Ganzábal**	**6**	**6**
4	(Spain) M Orantes	4	4
(France) **P Torre**	**7**	**6**
(South Africa) F Sauer	5	2
(Austria) **P Feigl**	**6**	**7**
2	(Paraguay) V Pecci Sr.	4	6

Quarterfinals
1	(Argentina) **G Vilas**	**6**	**6**
(Hungary) Z Kuhárszky	2	3
(Romania) F Segarceanu	4	4
8	(Uruguay) **D Pérez**	**6**	**6**
(Chile) B Prajoux	**6**	6	2
(Argentina) **A Ganzábal**	4	**7**	**6**
(France) **P Torre**	**2**
(Austria) P Feigl	0	R

Semifinals
1	(Argentina) **G Vilas**	**6**	**6**
8	(Uruguay) D Pérez	4	2
(Argentina) **A Ganzábal**	6	**7**	**6**
(France) P Torre	**7**	5	3

Final
1	(Argentina) **Guillermo Vilas**	**6**	**6**
(Argentina) Alejandro Ganzábal	2	4
