= Beeyong Sison =

Filipino tennis coach and former player (born 1957)

- Full name: Virgilio Sison
- Country (sports): Philippines
- Born: 20 February 1957 (age 68)

Singles
- Career record: 3–6
- Highest ranking: No. 332 (4 Jan 1982)

Doubles
- Career record: 17–21
- Highest ranking: No. 163 (3 Jan 1983)

Grand Slam doubles results
- Australian Open: 1R (1981)
- French Open: QF (1981)
- Wimbledon: 3R (1982)
- US Open: 2R (1982)

Virgilio "Beeyong" Sison (born 20 February 1957) is a Filipino tennis coach and former professional player. Following his playing career he coached in Switzerland for many years and set up a tennis school.

Sison played collegiate tennis in the United States, for both Odessa College and Oklahoma City University during the late 1970s. He was a U.S. Public Parks champion in singles.

A Filipino Davis Cup representative in 1983 and 1984, Sison was his nation's first player in the open era to feature in all four Grand Slam main draws. He made the men's doubles quarter-finals of the 1981 French Open with Markus Günthardt and was ranked in the world's top 200 for doubles.
