= Paul Torre =

French tennis player

- Country (sports): France
- Residence: Paris
- Born: 18 May 1953 (age 71); Toulouse, France
- Height: 1.80 m (5 ft 11 in)
- Turned pro: 1980

Singles
- Career record: 15–20
- Career titles: 0
- Highest ranking: No. 140 (4 January 1982)

Grand Slam singles results
- French Open: 3R (1981)

Doubles
- Career record: 1–7
- Career titles: 0
- Highest ranking: No. 401 (16 September 1985)

Grand Slam doubles results
- French Open: 1R (1981)

Paul-Antoine Torre (born 18 May 1953) is a former professional tennis player from France.

== Career ==
Torre made a surprise run to the third round of the 1981 French Open. He started the tournament with a five set win over Australian Paul McNamee. In the fifth set, McNamee served for the match, but Torre broke back and went on to win 7–5. The Frenchman then beat Ángel Giménez to set up a third round meeting with top seed Björn Borg, which he lost in straight sets. He also competed in the men's doubles, with Jérôme Potier. They were unable to get past the pairing of José Luis Clerc and Ilie Năstase in the first round.

His efforts in 1981 also included quarter-final appearances at Nice, the Sofia Open and the Stuttgart Indoor event.

In 1982, Torre was a semi-finalist in Buenos Aires, managing wins over Angel Gimenez, Freddie Sauer and Peter Feigl. He won the first set of his semi-final against Alejandro Ganzábal, but lost in three. He played again in the French Open that season but was unable to progress past the first round, losing to Peter Elter. It would be his final year on the Grand Prix tennis circuit.
