= 1981 Bavarian Tennis Championships =

- Date: 18–24 May
- Edition: 65th
- Draw: 32S / 16D
- Prize money: $75,000
- Surface: Clay / outdoor
- Location: Munich, West Germany
- Venue: MTTC Iphitos

Champions

Singles
- (New Zealand) Chris Lewis

Doubles
- (Australia) David Carter / (Australia) Paul Kronk
- Bavarian Tennis Championships

The 1981 Bavarian Tennis Championships was a men's Grand Prix Tennis Circuit tournament held in Munich, West Germany which was played on outdoor clay courts. It was the 65th edition of the tournament and was held from 18 May through 24 May 1981. Chris Lewis won the singles title.

== Finals ==
=== Singles ===
(New Zealand) Chris Lewis defeated (France) Christophe Roger-Vasselin 4–6, 6–2, 2–6, 6–1, 6–1

- It was Lewis's 2nd title of the year and the 7th of his career.

=== Doubles ===
(Australia) David Carter / (Australia) Paul Kronk defeated (United States) Eric Fromm / (Israel) Shlomo Glickstein 6–3, 6–4

- It was Carter's 3rd title of the year and the 3rd of his career. It was Kronk's 3rd title of the year and the 4th of his career.
