= Barbara Rossi (tennis) =

Italian tennis player

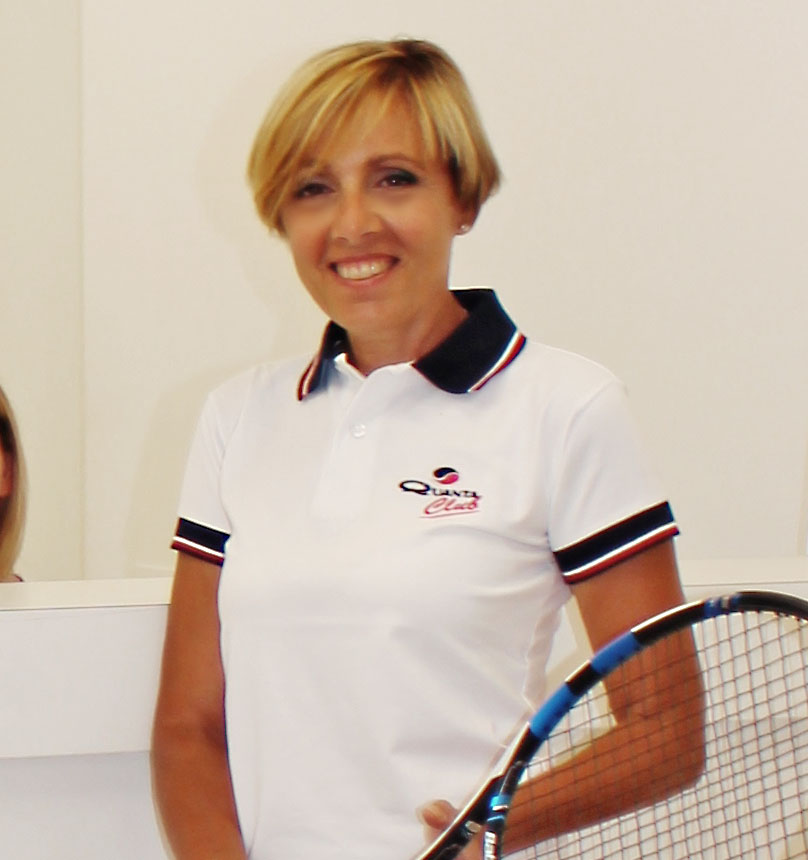
- Full name: Barbara Rossi
- Country (sports): Italy
- Born: 18 May 1961 (age 64) Milan, Italy
- Prize money: US$ 20,514

Singles

Grand Slam singles results
- French Open: 3R (1981)
- US Open: 2R (1982)

Doubles

Grand Slam doubles results
- French Open: 2R (1983)

Barbara Rossi (born 18 May 1961) is a former professional tennis player from Italy.

== Biography ==
=== Professional career ===
Rossi, who comes from Milan, represented Italy in nine Federation Cup ties. Competing on the WTA Tour in the early 1980s, her best result was a quarter-final appearance at the Japan Open in 1981. She made the third round of the 1981 French Open and had a win over Betty Stöve at the 1982 US Open.

=== Career after tennis ===
Since retiring as a player she has worked as a Milan-based tennis coach. Currently she runs the local Quanta Tennis Academy. She is also a tennis commentator for television network Eurosport.
