= 1980 South American Championships (tennis) =

- Date: 17–23 November
- Edition: 14th
- Category: Grand Prix circuit
- Draw: 32S / 16D
- Prize money: $175,000
- Surface: Clay / outdoor
- Location: Buenos Aires, Argentina

Champions

Singles
- (Argentina) José Luis Clerc

Doubles
- (Chile) Hans Gildemeister / (Ecuador) Andrés Gómez
← 1979 ·	South American Championships	· 1981 →

The 1980 South American Championships was a men's tennis tournament held in Buenos Aires, Argentina that was part of the 1980 Volvo Grand Prix. The event was played on outdoor clay courts and was held from 17 November though 23 November 1980. José Luis Clerc won the singles title.

== Finals ==
=== Singles ===
(Argentina) José Luis Clerc defeated (West Germany) Rolf Gehring 6–7, 2–6, 7–5, 6–0, 6–3

- It was Clerc's 6th title of the year and the 10th of his career.

=== Doubles ===
(Chile) Hans Gildemeister / (Ecuador) Andrés Gómez defeated (Spain) Ángel Giménez / (Venezuela) Jairo Velasco, Sr. 6–4, 7–5
