= Liliana Giussani =

Argentine tennis player

- Country (sports): Argentina
- Born: 27 April 1959 (age 66)

Singles

Grand Slam singles results
- French Open: 3R (1981)
- US Open: 2R (1980)

Doubles

Grand Slam doubles results
- French Open: 2R (1983)
- US Open: 1R (1982)

Grand Slam mixed doubles results
- French Open: 1R (1980, 1981, 1982, 1983)

Liliana Giussani (born 27 April 1959) is an Argentine former professional tennis player.

== Biography ==
Giussani, who comes from Córdoba, competed in two Federation Cup ties for Argentina, against the Netherlands in 1980 and Hungary in 1983, playing the doubles rubber in both.

Her best performance in a grand slam tournament came at the 1981 French Open, where she reached the third round. She featured three times in the mixed doubles main draw of the French Open with her brother Edgardo and had another brother, Gustavo, who also played on the professional tour.

== See also ==
- List of Argentina Fed Cup team representatives
