= 1981 French Open – Women's singles =

Women's singles
- 1981 French Open

Final
- Champion: (Czechoslovakia) Hana Mandlíková
- Runner-up: (West Germany) Sylvia Hanika
- Score: 6–2, 6–4

Details
- Draw: 96
- Seeds: 16

Events
Singles	men	women		boys	girls
Doubles	men	women	mixed	boys	girls
WC Singles	men	women	quad
WC Doubles	men	women	quad
Legends	−45	45+	women
- French Open

Hana Mandlíková defeated Sylvia Hanika in the final, 6–2, 6–4 to win the women's singles tennis title at the 1981 French Open. It was her second major singles title.

Chris Evert was the two-time defending champion, but lost in the semifinals to Mandlíková. It was her first defeat at the French Open since 1973, and the first time in six tournament appearances that she failed to reach the final.

== Seeds ==
The seeded players are listed below. Hana Mandlíková is the champion; others show the round in which they were eliminated.

1. (United States) Chris Evert (semifinals)
2. (United States) Martina Navratilova (quarterfinals)
3. (United States) Andrea Jaeger (semifinals)
4. (Czechoslovakia) Hana Mandlíková (champion)
5. (Romania) Virginia Ruzici (quarterfinals)
6. (West Germany) Sylvia Hanika (finalist)
7. (Socialist Federal Republic of Yugoslavia) Mima Jaušovec (quarterfinals)
8. (Australia) Dianne Fromholtz (third round)
9. (United States) Kathy Jordan (third round)
10. (West Germany) Bettina Bunge (fourth round)
11. (United States) Anne Smith (fourth round)
12. (Czechoslovakia) Regina Maršíková (fourth round)
13. (United States) Wendy White (second round)
14. (Argentina) Ivanna Madruga (third round)
15. (United States) Leslie Allen (fourth round)
16. (United Kingdom) Virginia Wade (fourth round)

== Draw ==
=== Key ===
- Q = Qualifier
- WC = Wild card
- LL = Lucky loser
- r = Retired

=== Finals ===
Quarterfinals
1	(United States) Chris Evert	6	6
5	(Romania) Virginia Ruzici	4	4
4	(Czechoslovakia) Hana Mandlíková	6	6
(United States) Kathy Rinaldi	1	3
7	(Socialist Federal Republic of Yugoslavia) Mima Jaušovec	6	2	0
3	(United States) Andrea Jaeger	4	6	6
6	(West Germany) Sylvia Hanika	6	6
2	(United States) Martina Navratilova	2	4

Semifinals
1	(United States) Chris Evert	5	4
4	(Czechoslovakia) Hana Mandlíková	7	6
3	(United States) Andrea Jaeger	6	1	4
6	(West Germany) Sylvia Hanika	4	6	6

Finals
4	(Czechoslovakia) Hana Mandlíková	6	6
6	(West Germany) Sylvia Hanika	2	4

=== Earlier rounds ===
==== Section 1 ====
First round
1	(United States) Evert	6	6
(West Germany) Kohde-Kilsch	3	2
(United States) Margolin	7	4	6
(Australia) Gulley	5	6	4
(United States) Jordan	6	6
(United Kingdom) Barker	3	0
(South Africa) Fairbank	6	6
(Sweden) Ekblom	4	4

Second round
1	(United States) Evert	6	6
(Argentina) Casabianca	4	0
(West Germany) Pfaff	6	6
(United States) Margolin	4	0
(United States) Jordan	3	3
(Poland) Kuczyńska	6	6
(South Africa) Fairbank	5	2
16	(United Kingdom) Wade	7	6

Third round
1	(United States) Evert	6	6
(West Germany) Pfaff	3	1
(Poland) Kuczyńska	1	3
16	(United Kingdom) Wade	6	6

Fourth round
1	(United States) Evert	6	6
16	(United Kingdom) Wade	3	0

==== Section 2 ====
First round
13	(United States) White	7	6
(United States) Nagelsen	6	4
(Switzerland) Delhees	6	6
(Switzerland) Jolissaint	0	0
(United States) Smith	4	6	7
(Netherlands) Stöve	6	4	5
(Netherlands) Schutte	7	1	10
(France) Thibault	5	6	8

Second round
13	(United States) White	6	5
(United States) Teeguarden	7	7
(United States) Casale	6	6
(Switzerland) Delhees	3	2
(United States) Harrington	6	5	6
(United States) Smith	4	7	3
(Netherlands) Schutte	3	3
5	(Romania) Ruzici	6	6

Third round
(United States) Teeguarden	4	6	6
(United States) Casale	6	2	2
(United States) Harrington	1	7	0
5	(Romania) Ruzici	6	6	6

Fourth round
(United States) Teeguarden	3	3
5	(Romania) Ruzici	6	6

==== Section 3 ====
First round
4	(Czechoslovakia) Mandlíková	6	6
(Romania) Romanov	2	1
(United States) Jones	7	6
(Australia) Gregory	5	3
(United States) Horvath	6	3	6
(United States) Gadusek	3	6	2
10	(West Germany) Bunge	6	6
(United Kingdom) Durie	2	3

Second round
4	(Czechoslovakia) Mandlíková	6	6
(United States) Casals	2	1
(Peru) Vásquez	6	7
(United States) Jones	1	5
(United States) Horvath	5	6	6
(Australia) O'Neil	7	4	0
(United States) Desfor	1	2
10	(West Germany) Bunge	6	6

Third round
4	(Czechoslovakia) Mandlíková	4	6	6
(Peru) Vásquez	6	0	4
(United States) Horvath	3	7	2
10	(West Germany) Bunge	6	5	6

Fourth round
4	(Czechoslovakia) Mandlíková	6	6
10	(West Germany) Bunge	3	1

==== Section 4 ====
First round
(Hungary) Pinterová	6	0	6
(South Korea) Lee	1	6	1
(United States) Collins	6	6
(France) Amiach	3	2
(United States) Rinaldi	6	6
(Spain) Perea	0	3
(Sweden) Sandin	6	6
(Australia) Freeman	1	2

Second round
11	(United States) Smith	4	6	6
(Hungary) Pinterová	6	3	1
(United States) Portman	6	2
(United States) Collins	7	6
(United States) DuVall	6	1	0
(United States) Rinaldi	4	6	6
(Sweden) Sandin	2	5
8	(Australia) Fromholtz	6	7

Third round
11	(United States) Smith	6	6
(United States) Collins	4	4
(United States) Rinaldi	6	7
8	(Australia) Fromholtz	3	5

Fourth round
11	(United States) Smith	1	6	3
(United States) Rinaldi	6	4	6

==== Section 5 ====
First round
7	(Socialist Federal Republic of Yugoslavia) Jaušovec	6	4	6
(Switzerland) Villiger	2	6	0
(Japan) Sato	6	7	7
(United States) Latham	7	5	5
(United States) Reynolds	7	6
(South Africa) Rollinson	5	2
(Switzerland) Strachoňová	7	6
(United States) Gilbert	5	4

Second round
7	(Socialist Federal Republic of Yugoslavia) Jaušovec	6	6
(United States) Buchanan	0	2
(Argentina) Giussani	6	7	6
(Japan) Sato	7	5	1
(United States) Sands	2	1
(United States) Reynolds	6	6
(Switzerland) Strachoňová	6	6	4
9	(United States) Jordan	4	7	6

Third round
7	(Socialist Federal Republic of Yugoslavia) Jaušovec	6	6
(Argentina) Giussani	0	3
(United States) Reynolds	2	7	6
9	(United States) Jordan	6	5	2

Fourth round
7	(Socialist Federal Republic of Yugoslavia) Jaušovec	6	6
(United States) Reynolds	3	2

==== Section 6 ====
First round
(Netherlands) Van der Torre	7	6
(South Africa) Harford	5	1
(Czechoslovakia) Tomanová	6	6
(United States) Du Pont	3	1
(South Africa) Vermaak	7	6
(Czechoslovakia) Budařová	5	1
3	(United States) Jaeger	4	7	6
(Hungary) Temesvári	6	6	3

Second round
14	(Argentina) Madruga	6	6
(Netherlands) Van der Torre	1	1
(Sweden) Bohm	6	6
(Czechoslovakia) Tomanová	3	3
(United States) Blount	2	1
(South Africa) Vermaak	6	6
(United Kingdom) Coles	1	0
3	(United States) Jaeger	6	6

Third round
14	(Argentina) Madruga	6	4	3
(Sweden) Bohm	2	6	6
(South Africa) Vermaak	1	2
3	(United States) Jaeger	6	6

Fourth round
(Sweden) Bohm	2	4
3	(United States) Jaeger	6	6

==== Section 7 ====
First round
(United Kingdom) Jevans	6	7
(France) Lovera	4	5
(Italy) Rossi	6	6
(United States) Lewis	3	2
(United States) Piatek	6	6
(Czechoslovakia) Skronská	4	2
(Brazil) Monteiro	6	7
(Czechoslovakia) Brzáková	2	6

Second round
6	(West Germany) Hanika	6	4	6
(United Kingdom) Jevans	2	6	3
(Brazil) Medrado	6	6	1
(Italy) Rossi	4	7	6
(United States) Piatek	3	6	6
(Netherlands) Vessies	6	2	2
(Brazil) Monteiro	1	1
12	(Czechoslovakia) Maršíková	6	6

Third round
6	(West Germany) Hanika	6	6
(Italy) Rossi	3	2
(United States) Piatek	6	5	5
12	(Czechoslovakia) Maršíková	2	7	7

Fourth round
6	(West Germany) Hanika	6	6
12	(Czechoslovakia) Maršíková	1	3

==== Section 8 ====
First round
(Australia) Minter	4	7	6
(France) Simon	6	5	3
(Australia) Remilton	6	6
(West Germany) Eisterlehner	4	2
(United States) White	6	6
(France) Franch	4	2
(West Germany) Riedel-Kühn	6	4	6
(Belgium) Gurdal	0	6	1

Second round
15	(United States) Allen	6	6
(Australia) Minter	4	2
(Australia) Remilton	7	4	8
(United Kingdom) Hobbs	6	6	6
(United States) White	1	6	6
(Australia) Tobin	6	3	2
(West Germany) Riedel-Kühn	4	0
2	(United States) Navratilova	6	6

Third round
15	(United States) Allen	6	7
(Australia) Remilton	1	6
(United States) White	1	1
2	(United States) Navratilova	6	6

Fourth round
15	(United States) Allen	1	2
2	(United States) Navratilova	6	6

Preceded by 1980 Australian Open – Women's singles	Grand Slam women's singles	Succeeded by 1981 Wimbledon Championships – Women's singles
