= 1978 Swiss Indoors =

- Date: 24–29 October
- Edition: 10th
- Category: Grand Prix
- Draw: 32S / 16D
- Prize money: $75,000
- Surface: Hard / indoor
- Location: Basel, Switzerland
- Venue: St. Jakobshalle

Champions

Singles
- (Argentina) Guillermo Vilas

Doubles
- (United States) John McEnroe / (Poland) Wojciech Fibak
- Swiss Indoors

The 1978 Swiss Indoors was a men's tennis tournament played on indoor hard courts at the St. Jakobshalle in Basel, Switzerland that was part of the 1978 Colgate-Palmolive Grand Prix. It was the tenth edition of the tournament and was held from 24 October through 29 October 1978. First-seeded Guillermo Vilas won the singles title.

== Finals ==
=== Singles ===
(Argentina) Guillermo Vilas defeated (United States) John McEnroe 6–3, 5–7, 7–5, 6–4

- It was Vilas' 6th singles title of the year and the 41st of his career.

=== Doubles ===
(United States) John McEnroe / (Poland) Wojciech Fibak defeated (United States) Bruce Manson / (Rhodesia) Andrew Pattison 7–6, 7–5
