= 1981 French Open – Women's doubles =

Women's doubles
- 1981 French Open

Final
- Champion: (South Africa) Rosalyn Fairbank (South Africa) Tanya Harford
- Runner-up: (United States) Candy Reynolds (United States) Paula Smith
- Score: 6–1, 6–3

Details
- Draw: 48
- Seeds: 12

Events
Singles	men	women		boys	girls
Doubles	men	women	mixed	boys	girls
WC Singles	men	women	quad
WC Doubles	men	women	quad
Legends	−45	45+	women
← 1980 ·	French Open	· 1982 →

The women's doubles tournament at the 1981 French Open was held from 25 May to 7 June 1981 on the outdoor clay courts at the Stade Roland Garros in Paris, France. Rosalyn Fairbank and Tanya Harford won the title, defeating Candy Reynolds and Paula Smith in the final.

== Seeds ==
1. (United States) Kathy Jordan / (United States) Anne Smith (quarterfinals)
2. (United States) Candy Reynolds / (United States) Paula Smith (final)
3. (United States) Betsy Nagelsen / (United States) Martina Navratilova (semifinals)
4. (Czechoslovakia) Hana Mandlíková / (Netherlands) Betty Stöve (third round)
5. (United States) Rosie Casals / (Socialist Federal Republic of Yugoslavia) Mima Jaušovec (second round)
6. (United States) Chris Evert-Lloyd / (Romania) Virginia Ruzici (quarterfinals)
7. (West Germany) Sylvia Hanika / (United States) Andrea Jaeger (third round)
8. (South Africa) Rosalyn Fairbank / (South Africa) Tanya Harford (champions)
9. (United States) Leslie Allen / (United Kingdom) Virginia Wade (second round)
10. (United States) Billie Jean King / (South Africa) Ilana Kloss (quarterfinals)
11. (Czechoslovakia) Regina Maršíková / (Czechoslovakia) Renáta Tomanová (third round)
12. (United States) Mary-Lou Piatek / (United States) Wendy White (second round)

== Draw ==
=== Key ===
- Q = Qualifier
- WC = Wild card
- LL = Lucky loser
- Alt = Alternate
- SE = Special exempt
- PR = Protected ranking
- ITF = ITF entry
- JE = Junior exempt
- w/o = Walkover
- r = Retired
- d = Defaulted
- SR = Special ranking

=== Finals ===
Quarterfinals
1	(United States) Kathy Jordan (United States) Anne Smith	3	6
8	(South Africa) Rosalyn Fairbank (South Africa) Tanya Harford	6	7
(West Germany) Bettina Bunge (West Germany) Claudia Kohde-Kilsch	6	7
(United Kingdom) Glynis Coles (Japan) Naoko Sato	4	6
6	(United States) Chris Evert-Lloyd (Romania) Virginia Ruzici	5	6	5
3	(United States) Betsy Nagelsen (United States) Martina Navratilova	7	2	7
10	(United States) Billie Jean King (South Africa) Ilana Kloss	6	3
2	(United States) Candy Reynolds (United States) Paula Smith	7	6

Semifinals
8	(South Africa) Rosalyn Fairbank (South Africa) Tanya Harford	6	3	6
(West Germany) Bettina Bunge (West Germany) Claudia Kohde-Kilsch	3	6	2
3	(United States) Betsy Nagelsen (United States) Martina Navratilova	4	5
2	(United States) Candy Reynolds (United States) Paula Smith	6	7

Final
8	(South Africa) Rosalyn Fairbank (South Africa) Tanya Harford	6	6
2	(United States) Candy Reynolds (United States) Paula Smith	1	3

=== Top half ===
==== Section 1 ====
First round
1	(United States) K Jordan (United States) A Smith	6	6
(Czechoslovakia) Y Brzáková (United States) A Buchanan	1	2
(France) C Franch (France) S Provoust	1	2
(United Kingdom) J Durie (United Kingdom) D Jevans	6	6
(United States) L duPont (United States) B Jordan	6	6
(United States) R Blount (United States) K Latham	3	4
(Netherlands) E Vessies (Sweden) M Wikstedt	3	4
(United States) S Collins (Switzerland) H Strachoňová	6	6

Second round
1	(United States) K Jordan (United States) A Smith	3	6	6
(Brazil) P Medrado (Brazil) C Monteiro	6	4	3
(United Kingdom) J Durie (United Kingdom) D Jevans	7	3	6
(United States) D Desfor (United States) T Lewis	6	6	3
9	(United States) L Allen (United Kingdom) V Wade	7	5	8
(United States) L duPont (United States) B Jordan	6	7	10
(United States) S Collins (Switzerland) H Strachoňová	4	6	7
8	(South Africa) R Fairbank (South Africa) T Harford	6	4	9

Third round
1	(United States) K Jordan (United States) A Smith	6	6
(United Kingdom) J Durie (United Kingdom) D Jevans	2	1
(United States) L duPont (United States) B Jordan	6	3	2
8	(South Africa) R Fairbank (South Africa) T Harford	4	6	6

Quarterfinals
1	(United States) K Jordan (United States) A Smith	3	6
8	(South Africa) R Fairbank (South Africa) T Harford	6	7

==== Section 2 ====
First round
4	(Czechoslovakia) H Mandlíková (Netherlands) B Stöve	w/o
(United States) K Horvath (United States) K Sands
(West Germany) B Bunge (West Germany) C Kohde-Kilsch	6	6
(Australia) K Gulley (Australia) A Tobin	0	2
(Czechoslovakia) I Budařová (Czechoslovakia) K Skronská	6	3	2
(United Kingdom) G Coles (Japan) N Sato	4	6	6
(Australia) J Mundel (South Africa) S Rollinson	2	7	0
5	(United States) R Casals (Socialist Federal Republic of Yugoslavia) M Jaušovec	6	5	6

Second round
4	(Czechoslovakia) H Mandlíková (Netherlands) B Stöve	6	6
(Australia) D Freeman (Australia) C O'Neil	1	2
(West Germany) B Bunge (West Germany) C Kohde-Kilsch	7	6
12	(United States) M-L Piatek (United States) W White	6	3
(Australia) B Remilton (Peru) P Vásquez	4	6
(United Kingdom) G Coles (Japan) N Sato	6	7
(United States) L Forood (United Kingdom) A Hobbs	0	6	6
5	(United States) R Casals (Socialist Federal Republic of Yugoslavia) M Jaušovec	6	2	2

Third round
4	(Czechoslovakia) H Mandlíková (Netherlands) B Stöve	0	4
(West Germany) B Bunge (West Germany) C Kohde-Kilsch	6	6
(United Kingdom) G Coles (Japan) N Sato	6	7
(United States) L Forood (United Kingdom) A Hobbs	3	6

Quarterfinals
(West Germany) B Bunge (West Germany) C Kohde-Kilsch	6	7
(United Kingdom) G Coles (Japan) N Sato	4	6

=== Bottom half ===
==== Section 3 ====
First round
6	(United States) C Evert-Lloyd (Romania) V Ruzici	6	7
(France) F Thibault (France) C Vanier	1	6
(Australia) N Gregory (Hungary) M Pinterová	6	6
(Sweden) N Bohm (Sweden) E Ekblom	4	3
11	(Czechoslovakia) R Maršíková (Czechoslovakia) R Tomanová	6	6
(South Korea) D-h Lee (Australia) A Minter	2	4
(France) D Beillan (Spain) C Perea	0	6
3	(United States) B Nagelsen (United States) M Navratilova	6	7

Second round
6	(United States) C Evert-Lloyd (Romania) V Ruzici	3	6	7
(France) F Dürr (United States) P Teeguarden	6	3	5
(Australia) N Gregory (Hungary) M Pinterová	6	6
(United States) D Gilbert (United States) J Portman	4	2
11	(Czechoslovakia) R Maršíková (Czechoslovakia) R Tomanová	7	6
(West Germany) E Pfaff (Sweden) L Sandin	6	2
(France) G Benedetti (Hungary) A Temesvári	2	4
3	(United States) B Nagelsen (United States) M Navratilova	6	6

Third round
6	(United States) C Evert-Lloyd (Romania) V Ruzici	6	6
(Australia) N Gregory (Hungary) M Pinterová	4	4
11	(Czechoslovakia) R Maršíková (Czechoslovakia) R Tomanová	6	1
3	(United States) B Nagelsen (United States) M Navratilova	7	6

Quarterfinals
6	(United States) C Evert-Lloyd (Romania) V Ruzici	5	6	5
3	(United States) B Nagelsen (United States) M Navratilova	7	2	7

==== Section 4 ====
First round
7	(West Germany) S Hanika (United States) A Jaeger	6	6
(Switzerland) C Jollisaint (Netherlands) M Mesker	1	1
(United States) J Goodling (United States) J Harrington	5	4
(Netherlands) M Pakker (Netherlands) M van der Torre	7	6
(United States) S Margolin (United States) A White	6	6
(United States) K Jones (United States) K Rinaldi	0	0
(Argentina) M Madruga (Argentina) A Villagrán	6	2
2	(United States) C Reynolds (United States) P Smith	7	6

Second round
7	(West Germany) S Hanika (United States) A Jaeger	6	6
(New Zealand) C Newton (Australia) P Whytcross	3	4
(Netherlands) M Pakker (Netherlands) M van der Torre
10	(United States) BJ King (South Africa) I Kloss	w/o
(United States) P Johnson (Switzerland) I Villiger	2	6
(United States) S Margolin (United States) A White	6	7
(Romania) L Romanov (Romania) M Romanov	5	2
2	(United States) C Reynolds (United States) P Smith	7	6

Third round
7	(West Germany) S Hanika (United States) A Jaeger	6	2	4
10	(United States) BJ King (South Africa) I Kloss	0	6	6
(United States) S Margolin (United States) A White	0	0
2	(United States) C Reynolds (United States) P Smith	6	6

Quarterfinals
10	(United States) BJ King (South Africa) I Kloss	6	3
2	(United States) C Reynolds (United States) P Smith	7	6
