= Edgardo Giussani =

Argentine tennis player

- Country (sports): Argentina
- Born: 4 November 1955 (age 69)

Singles
- Career record: 0–0
- Career titles: 0
- Highest ranking: No. 382 (4 January 1982)

Doubles
- Career record: 1–1
- Career titles: 0
- Highest ranking: No. 507 (3 January 1983)

Grand Slam mixed doubles results
- French Open: 1R (1980, 1981, 1983)

Edgardo Giussani (born 4 November 1955) is an Argentine former professional tennis player.

== Biography ==
Nicknamed "Chupete", Giussani featured three times in the mixed doubles main draw of the French Open with her sister Liliana in the early 1980s. Their younger brother Gustavo also played tennis professionally.

His best result in a Grand Prix tournament came in doubles at the 1981 Bordeaux Open, where he reached the quarterfinals partnering with Guillermo Stevens.

Giussani coached David Nalbandian when the latter was a teenager.
