= 1982 Grand Prix la Serenisima =

- Date: 1–7 February
- Edition: 16th
- Category: Grand Prix
- Draw: 32S / 16D
- Prize money: $75,000
- Surface: Clay / outdoor
- Location: Buenos Aires, Argentina

Champions

Singles
- (Argentina) Guillermo Vilas

Doubles
- (Austria) Hans Kary / (Hungary) Zoltan Kuharszky
← 1981 ·	Buenos Aires Grand Prix	· 1985 →

The 1982 Grand Prix La Serenisima, also known as the Buenos Aires Grand Prix, was an Association of Tennis Professionals men's tennis tournament held in Buenos Aires, Argentina and took place from 1 February through 7 February 1982. It was the 16th edition of the tournament and first-seeded Guillermo Vilas won the singles title.

== Finals ==
=== Singles ===
(Argentina) Guillermo Vilas defeated (Argentina) Alejandro Ganzábal 6–2, 6–4

- It was Vilas's 1st singles title of the year and the 53rd of his career.

=== Doubles ===
(Austria) Hans Kary / (Hungary) Zoltán Kuhárszky defeated (Spain) Ángel Giménez / (Spain) Manuel Orantes 7–5, 6–2

- It was Kary's only title of the year and the 4th of his career. It was Kuharszky's only title of the year and the 1st of his career.
