= José García Requena =

Spanish tennis player (1955–2014)

- Full name: José García Requena
- Country (sports): Spain
- Born: 23 July 1955; Almería, Spain
- Died: 28 February 2014 (aged 58); Huelva, Spain
- Plays: Right-handed

Singles
- Career record: 8–20
- Career titles: 0
- Highest ranking: No. 66 (14 June 1982)

Grand Slam singles results
- French Open: 1R (1982)

Doubles
- Career record: 2–6
- Career titles: 0
- Highest ranking: No. 480 (3 January 1983)

Grand Slam doubles results
- French Open: 2R (1981)
- US Open: 2R (1979)

José García Requena (23 July 1955 – 28 February 2014) was a professional tennis player from Spain.

== Career ==
García Requena, who was from Barcelona, represented Spain in a 1981 Davis Cup tie against Algeria in Algiers. He played two singles rubbers which he both won, over Yassine Amier and Djamel Boudjemline. Three months later he won the Layetano Challenger tournament in Barcelona. He beat Mark Dickson in the final.

In 1982 he managed a win over Manuel Orantes in Nice and had his best performance in a Grand Prix tournament when he made the semi-finals of the Bavarian Tennis Championships in Munich. He made the main draw of the 1982 French Open but was unable to get past American Lloyd Bourne in the first round.

Retiring from professional tennis in 1986, he remained involved in tennis as head of the Real Club Recreativo de Tenis de Huelva.

He died of lung cancer in 2014.

== Challenger titles ==
=== Singles: (1) ===
W/L	Date	Tournament	Surface	Opponent	Score
1.	1981	Layetano, Spain	Clay	(United States) Mark Dickson	6–1, 6–7, 7–5

== See also ==
- List of Spain Davis Cup team representatives
