= 1982 Bavarian Tennis Championships =

- Date: 17–23 May
- Edition: 66th
- Draw: 32S / 16D
- Prize money: $75,000
- Surface: Clay / outdoor
- Location: Munich, West Germany
- Venue: MTTC Iphitos

Champions

Singles
- (United States) Gene Mayer

Doubles
- (United States) Chip Hooper / (United States) Mel Purcell
- Bavarian Tennis Championships

The 1982 Bavarian Tennis Championships was a men's Grand Prix tennis circuit tournament held in Munich, West Germany which was played on outdoor clay courts. It was the 66th edition of the tournament and was held from 17 May through 23 May 1982. Second-seeded Gene Mayer won the singles title.

== Finals ==
=== Singles ===
(United States) Gene Mayer defeated (West Germany) Peter Elter 3–6, 6–3, 6–2, 6–1

- It was Mayer's only title of the year and the 27th of his career.

=== Doubles ===
(United States) Chip Hooper / (United States) Mel Purcell defeated (South Africa) Tian Viljoen / (South Africa) Danie Visser 6–4, 7–6

- It was Hooper's only title of the year and the 1st of his career. It was Purcell's 1st title of the year and the 4th of his career.
