= Rick Fagel =

American tennis player

- Country (sports): United States
- Born: November 29, 1953 (age 71); Miami, Florida
- Height: 5 ft 11 in (1.80 m)
- Plays: Right-handed
- Prize money: $64,787

Singles
- Career record: 46–97
- Career titles: 0
- Highest ranking: No. 76 (Jan 16, 1978)

Grand Slam singles results
- French Open: 2R (1978)
- Wimbledon: 1R (1978, 79, 81, 82)
- US Open: 3R (1977)

Doubles
- Career record: 29–75
- Career titles: 0
- Highest ranking: No. 256 (Jan 3, 1983)

Grand Slam doubles results
- French Open: 3R (1979)
- Wimbledon: 1R (1979)
- US Open: 1R (1975, 77, 78, 80, 81)

Mixed doubles

Grand Slam mixed doubles results
- French Open: QF (1981)
- US Open: 2R (1978)

Rick Fagel (born November 29, 1953) is a former professional tennis player from the United States.

== Career ==
Fagel played collegiate tennis at Columbia University and won the Ivy League Championship in 1972, beating Vitas Gerulaitis in the final.

He appeared in 14 Grand Slam during his career. His best performance came at the 1977 US Open, where he reached the third round, with wins over Russell Simpson and Antonio Munoz. He was a mixed doubles quarter-finalist at the 1981 French Open, with German Eva Pfaff as his partner. En route they defeating a pairing consisting of Billie Jean King and Ilie Năstase.

Fagel defeated John McEnroe at the Cincinnati Grand Prix tournament in 1977. He was eliminated at the semi-final stage, by Mark Cox. The following year he made the quarter-finals of the Florence Open. In 1980 he and partner David Carter were doubles runners-up at the Sarasota Grand Prix.

== Grand Prix career finals ==
=== Doubles: 1 (0–1) ===
Result	W-L	Date	Tournament	Surface	Partner	Opponents	Score
Loss	0–1	Feb 1980	Sarasota, United States	Clay	(Australia) David Carter	(Ecuador) Andrés Gómez (Ecuador) Ricardo Ycaza	3–6, 4–6

== Challenger titles ==
=== Singles: (1) ===
No.	Year	Tournament	Surface	Opponent	Score
1.	1981	San Luis Potosi, Mexico	Clay	(United States) Steve Meister	7–6, 6–1
