= 1979 Swiss Indoors =

- Date: 15–21 October
- Edition: 11th
- Category: Grand Prix
- Draw: 32S / 16D
- Prize money: $75,000
- Surface: Hard / indoor
- Location: Basel, Switzerland
- Venue: St. Jakobshalle

Champions

Singles
- (United States) Brian Gottfried

Doubles
- (South Africa) Frew McMillan / (South Africa) Bob Hewitt
- Swiss Indoors

The 1979 Swiss Indoors was a men's tennis tournament played on indoor hard courts at the St. Jakobshalle in Basel, Switzerland that was part of the 1979 Colgate-Palmolive Grand Prix. It was the 11th edition of the tournament and was held from 15 October through 21 October 1979. Third-seeded Brian Gottfried won the singles title.

== Finals ==
=== Singles ===
(United States) Brian Gottfried defeated (South Africa) Johan Kriek 7–5, 6–1, 4–6, 6–3

- It was Gottfried's 2nd singles title of the year and the 17th of his career.

=== Doubles ===
(South Africa) Frew McMillan / (South Africa) Bob Hewitt defeated (United States) Brian Gottfried / (Mexico) Raúl Ramírez 6–3, 6–4
