= Alejandro Ganzábal =

Argentine tennis player

- Country (sports): Argentina
- Born: 16 February 1960 (age 66) Buenos Aires, Argentina
- Height: 1.80 m (5 ft 11 in)
- Plays: Right-handed
- Prize money: $151,882

Singles
- Career record: 46–68
- Career titles: 0
- Highest ranking: No. 58 (28 January 1985)

Grand Slam singles results
- French Open: 3R (1981)
- US Open: 1R (1985)

Doubles
- Career record: 18–35
- Career titles: 1
- Highest ranking: No. 89 (7 April 1986)

Grand Slam doubles results
- French Open: 1R (1981, 1982)

Alejandro Román Ganzábal (born 16 February 1960) is a former professional tennis player from Argentina.

== Career ==
Ganzabal made his Grand Slam debut in the 1981 French Open and managed to reach the third round, beating former finalist Manuel Orantes and American Steve Krulevitz.

In 1982 he was runner-up in the Buenos Aires Grand Prix tournament and made quarter-finals at Venice, Boston and Quito. He had an upset win over third seed Eliot Teltscher in Boston. At the French Open that year, Ganzabal defeated Júlio Góes in the opening round but was unable to overcome Mike Myburg in the second round, losing in five sets.

His best result in 1983 was at Aix-En-Provence in France, where he was a quarter-finalist. He was defeated by Fernando Luna in the opening round of that year's French Open.

The Argentine didn't make an appearance on the 1984 Grand Prix season until July, as he had been ill with hepatitis. He finished the year well, making the quarter-finals in North Conway, semi-finals in Geneva and quarter-finals in Indianapolis. At these tournaments he secured two wins over top 20 player Tomáš Šmíd and also defeated world number 11 Henrik Sundström.

Ganzabal beat Russell Simpson in the opening round of the 1985 French Open, then lost to countryman José Luis Clerc. He was however unable to progress past the first round at the 1985 US Open, losing to Brian Teacher.

As a doubles player, he made two Grand Slam appearances, both with Gustavo Guerrero. He and partner Claudio Panatta won the 1985 Kim Top Line Trophy, held in Bari.

He took part in three Davis Cup ties for Argentina, all while they were in the World Group. In 1982 he played a doubles rubber with Guillermo Vilas, which they lost to the French pairing of Gilles Moretton and Yannick Noah. He other two matches were dead rubbers and he lost both, against Michael Westphal of West Germany and American player Gene Mayer.

== Grand Prix career finals ==
=== Singles: 1 (0–1) ===
Result	W-L	Year	Tournament	Surface	Opponent	Score
Loss	0–1	Feb 1982	Buenos Aires, Argentina	Clay	(Argentina) Guillermo Vilas	2–6, 4–6

=== Doubles: 1 (1–0) ===
Result	W-L	Year	Tournament	Surface	Partner	Opponents	Score
Win	1–0	Apr 1985	Bari, Italy	Clay	(Italy) Claudio Panatta	(United States) Marcel Freeman (Australia) Laurie Warder	6–4, 6–2

== Challenger titles ==
=== Doubles: (1) ===
No.	Year	Tournament	Surface	Partner	Opponents	Score
1.	1982	Bari, Italy	Clay	(Argentina) Gustavo Guerrero	(Italy) Luca Bottazzi (Switzerland) Ivan Dupasquier	6–3, 6–2
