= João Soares (tennis) =

Brazilian tennis player

- Country (sports): Brazil
- Born: April 25, 1951 (age 75) Limeira, Brazil
- Height: 6 ft 1 in (185 cm)
- Plays: Right-handed
- Prize money: $73,074

Singles
- Career record: 42–99
- Highest ranking: No. 74 (1982.08.09)

Grand Slam singles results
- Australian Open: 1R (1976)
- French Open: 2R (1980)
- Wimbledon: 3R (1983)
- US Open: 1R (1980, 1982, 1983)

Doubles
- Career record: 83–110
- Career titles: 3
- Highest ranking: No. 49 (1980.04.28)

Grand Slam doubles results
- Australian Open: 1R (1976)
- French Open: 2R (1979, 1982, 1987)
- Wimbledon: QF (1982)
- US Open: 3R (1985)

João Soares (born April 25, 1951) is a former professional tennis player from Brazil.

Soares found most of his tennis success while playing doubles. During his career, he won three doubles titles. He achieved a career-high doubles ranking of no. 49 in 1980.

== Career finals ==
=== Doubles: 7 (3 titles / 4 runner-ups) ===
Result	W-L	Date	Tournament	Surface	Partner	Opponents	Score
Loss	0–1	Nov 1979	Buenos Aires, Argentina	Clay	(Brazil) Marcos Hocevar	(Czechoslovakia) Tomáš Šmíd (United States) Sherwood Stewart	1–6, 5–7
Loss	0–2	Nov 1980	Santiago, Chile	Clay	(Brazil) Carlos Kirmayr	(Chile) Belus Prajoux (Ecuador) Ricardo Ycaza	6–4, 6–7, 4–6
Win	1–2	Nov 1981	Buenos Aires, Argentina	Clay	(Brazil) Marcos Hocevar	(Chile) Jaime Fillol (Chile) Álvaro Fillol	7–6, 6–7, 6–4
Win	2–2	Nov 1982	Itaparica, Brazil	Carpet	(Brazil) Givaldo Barbosa	(Brazil) Thomaz Koch (Brazil) José Schmidt	7–6, 2–1, ret.
Win	3–2	Nov 1983	Bahia, Brazil	Hard	(Brazil) Givaldo Barbosa	(Argentina) Ricardo Cano (Brazil) Thomaz Koch	
Loss	3–3	Jul 1984	Gstaad, Switzerland	Clay	(Brazil) Givaldo Barbosa	(Switzerland) Heinz Günthardt (Switzerland) Markus Günthardt	4–6, 6–3, 6–7
Loss	3–4	Sep 1985	Stuttgart Outdoor, Germany	Clay	(United States) Andy Kohlberg	(Czechoslovakia) Ivan Lendl (Czechoslovakia) Tomáš Šmíd	6–3, 4–6, 2–6
