= Markus Günthardt =

Swiss tennis player (born 1957)

- Country (sports): Switzerland
- Born: 10 September 1957 (age 69) Zurich, Switzerland
- Height: 5 ft 10 in (178 cm)
- Plays: Right-handed
- Prize money: $81,388

Singles
- Career record: 1–15
- Career titles: 0
- Highest ranking: No. 209 (4 January 1981)

Grand Slam singles results
- US Open: 1R (1981)

Doubles
- Career record: 70–77
- Career titles: 3
- Highest ranking: No. 44 (17 September 1984)

Grand Slam doubles results
- Australian Open: 2R (1981)
- French Open: QF (1981)
- Wimbledon: 3R (1982)
- US Open: 1R (1981)

Markus Günthardt (born 10 September 1957) is a Swiss former tennis player. Günthardt won three doubles titles during his professional career. The right-hander reached his highest ATP doubles ranking on 17 September 1984, when he became the number 44 in the world.

Günthardt participated in 14 Davis Cup ties for Switzerland from 1980 to 1986, posting a 9-5 record in doubles.

Günthardt's younger brother Heinz was a successful doubles player, winning two Grand Slam doubles titles in his career.

== Career finals ==
=== Doubles: 8 (3 titles / 5 runner-ups) ===
Result	W-L	Date	Tournament	Surface	Partner	Opponents	Score
Win	1–0	Jul 1980	Båstad, Sweden	Clay	(Switzerland) Heinz Günthardt	(United Kingdom) John Feaver (Australia) Peter McNamara	6–4, 6–4
Loss	1–1	Sep 1980	Geneva, Switzerland	Clay	(Switzerland) Heinz Günthardt	(Socialist Federal Republic of Yugoslavia) Željko Franulović (Hungary) Balázs Taróczy	4–6, 6–4, 4–6
Win	2–1	Jul 1981	Gstaad, Switzerland	Clay	(Switzerland) Heinz Günthardt	(Australia) David Carter (Australia) Paul Kronk	6–4, 6–1
Loss	2–2	Oct 1981	Basel, Switzerland	Hard (i)	(Czechoslovakia) Pavel Složil	(Argentina) José Luis Clerc (Romania) Ilie Năstase	6–7, 7–6, 6–7
Loss	2–3	Feb 1982	Cairo, Egypt	Clay	(Switzerland) Heinz Günthardt	(United States) Drew Gitlin (United States) Jim Gurfein	4–6, 5–7
Loss	2–4	Jul 1982	Gstaad, Switzerland	Clay	(Switzerland) Heinz Günthardt	(United States) Sandy Mayer (United States) Ferdi Taygan	2–6, 3–6
Loss	2–5	May 1983	Madrid, Spain	Clay	(Hungary) Zoltán Kuhárszky	(Switzerland) Heinz Günthardt (Czechoslovakia) Pavel Složil	3–6, 3–6
Win	3–5	Jul 1984	Gstaad, Switzerland	Clay	(Switzerland) Heinz Günthardt	(Brazil) Givaldo Barbosa (Brazil) João Soares	6–4, 3–6, 7–6
