= Christophe Freyss =

French tennis player

- Country (sports): France
- Born: 30 August 1956 (age 70) Strasbourg, France
- Height: 6 ft 0 in (183 cm)
- Plays: Left-handed

Singles
- Career record: 48–83
- Highest ranking: No. 82 (4 January 1981)

Grand Slam singles results
- Australian Open: 1R (1978)
- French Open: 2R (1979)
- Wimbledon: 1R (1981)
- US Open: 2R (1978)

Doubles
- Career record: 23–49
- Highest ranking: No. 144 (4 January 1981)

Grand Slam doubles results
- French Open: 2R (1977, 1980)

Christophe Freyss (born 30 August 1956) is a former professional tennis player from France.

Freyss achieved a career-high singles ranking of world No. 82 in 1980.

== ATP career finals ==
=== Singles runners-up (2) ===
Result	W/L	Date	Tournament	Surface	Opponent	Score
Loss	0–1	May 1980	Munich, West Germany	Clay	(West Germany) Rolf Gehring	2–6, 6–0, 2–6, 2–6
Loss	0–2	Nov 1980	Santiago, Chile	Clay	(Paraguay) Víctor Pecci	6–4, 4–6, 3–6

=== Doubles runners-up (1) ===
Result	W/L	Date	Tournament	Surface	Partner	Opponents	Score
Loss	0–1	Mar 1980	Cairo, Egypt	Clay	(France) Bernard Fritz	(Egypt) Ismail El Shafei (Netherlands) Tom Okker	3–6, 6–3, 3–6
