= 1981 French Open =

- Date: 25 May – 7 June 1981
- Edition: 80
- Category: 51st Grand Slam (ITF)
- Draw: 128S / 64D / 32X
- Prize money: $450,000
- Surface: Clay / outdoor
- Location: Paris (XVI^{e}), France
- Venue: Stade Roland Garros

Champions

Men's singles
- (Sweden) Björn Borg

Women's singles
- (Czechoslovakia) Hana Mandlíková

Men's doubles
- (Switzerland) Heinz Günthardt / (Hungary) Balázs Taróczy

Women's doubles
- (South Africa) Rosalyn Fairbank Nideffer / (South Africa) Tanya Harford

Mixed doubles
- (United States) Andrea Jaeger / (United States) James Arias
- French Open

The 1981 French Open was a tennis tournament that took place on the outdoor clay courts at the Stade Roland Garros in Paris, France. The tournament ran from 25 May until 7 June. It was the 80th staging of the French Open, and the first Grand Slam tennis event of 1981.

== Finals ==
=== Men's singles ===
(Sweden) Björn Borg defeated (Czechoslovakia) Ivan Lendl, 6–1, 4–6, 6–2, 3–6, 6–1

- It was Borg's 1st title of the year, and his 61st overall. It was his 11th (and last) career Grand Slam title, and his 6th French Open title (at that time, an Open Era record).

=== Women's singles ===
(Czechoslovakia) Hana Mandlíková defeated (West Germany) Sylvia Hanika, 6–2, 6–4

- It was Mandlíková's 2nd title of the year, and her 13th overall. It was her 2nd career Grand Slam title, and her 1st French Open title.

=== Men's doubles ===
(Switzerland) Heinz Günthardt / (Hungary) Balázs Taróczy defeated (United States) Terry Moor / (United States) Eliot Teltscher, 6–2, 7–6, 6–3

=== Women's doubles ===
(South Africa) Rosalyn Fairbank / (South Africa) Tanya Harford defeated (United States) Candy Reynolds / (United States) Paula Smith, 6–1, 6–3

=== Mixed doubles ===
(United States) Andrea Jaeger / (United States) James Arias defeated (Netherlands) Betty Stöve / (United States) Frederick McNair, 7–6, 6–4

== Prize money ==
Event		W	F	SF	QF	4R	3R	2R	1R
Singles	Men	FF271,100	FF135,600	FF67,800	FF34,400	FF19,900	FF10,900	FF6,300	FF3,600
Singles	Women	FF208,000	FF108,000	FF54,000	FF28,000	FF14,500	FF7,300	FF3,650	FF1,950

Total prize money for the event was FF3,365,445.

Preceded by 1980 Australian Open	Grand Slams	Succeeded by 1981 Wimbledon Championships
