= Marcos Hocevar =

Brazilian tennis player

- Country (sports): Brazil
- Residence: Porto Alegre, Brazil
- Born: 6 September 1955 (age 71) Ijuí, Brazil
- Height: 1.85 m (6 ft 1 in)
- Turned pro: 1979
- Retired: 1992
- Plays: Right-handed
- Prize money: $330,047

Singles
- Career record: 79–97
- Career titles: 0
- Highest ranking: No. 30 (20 June 1983)

Grand Slam singles results
- Australian Open: 3R (1983)
- French Open: 3R (1983, 1985)
- Wimbledon: 3R (1982)
- US Open: 2R (1982)

Doubles
- Career record: 65–95
- Career titles: 1
- Highest ranking: No. 86 (14 October 1985)

Team competitions
- Davis Cup: F^{Am} (1983, 1984, 1985)

Marcos Hocevar (born 26 September 1955) is a former professional tennis player from Brazil.

Hocevar was born in Ijuí, Rio Grande do Sul, of Slovene descent.

During his career he finished runner-up at 2 singles events and won 1 doubles title. He achieved a career-high singles ranking of world No. 30 in 1983 and a career-high doubles ranking of world No. 86 in 1985.

Hocevar was the recipient of the first recorded Golden set in competitive male tennis, losing to Bill Scanlon 2–6, 0–6 at Delray Beach in 1983.

== Career finals ==
=== Singles (2 runner-ups ===
Result	W-L	Date	Tournament	Surface	Opponent	Score
Loss	0–1	Jul 1982	Kitzbühel, Austria	Clay	(Argentina) Guillermo Vilas	6–7^{(4–7)}, 1–6
Loss	0–2	Nov 1982	São Paulo, Brazil	Clay	(Argentina) José Luis Clerc	2–6, 7–6, 3–6

=== Doubles (1 title) ===
Result	W-L	Date	Tournament	Surface	Partner	Opponents	Score
Loss	0–1	Nov 1979	Buenos Aires, Argentina	Clay	(Brazil) João Soares	(Czechoslovakia) Tomáš Šmíd (United States) Sherwood Stewart	1–6, 5–7
Win	1–1	Nov 1981	Buenos Aires, Argentina	Clay	(Brazil) João Soares	(Chile) Álvaro Fillol (Chile) Jaime Fillol	7–6, 6–7, 6–4
Loss	1–2	Oct 1983	Vienna, Austria	Hard (i)	(Brazil) Cássio Motta	(United States) Mel Purcell (United States) Stan Smith	3–6, 4–6
