= Klaus Eberhard (tennis) =

German tennis player

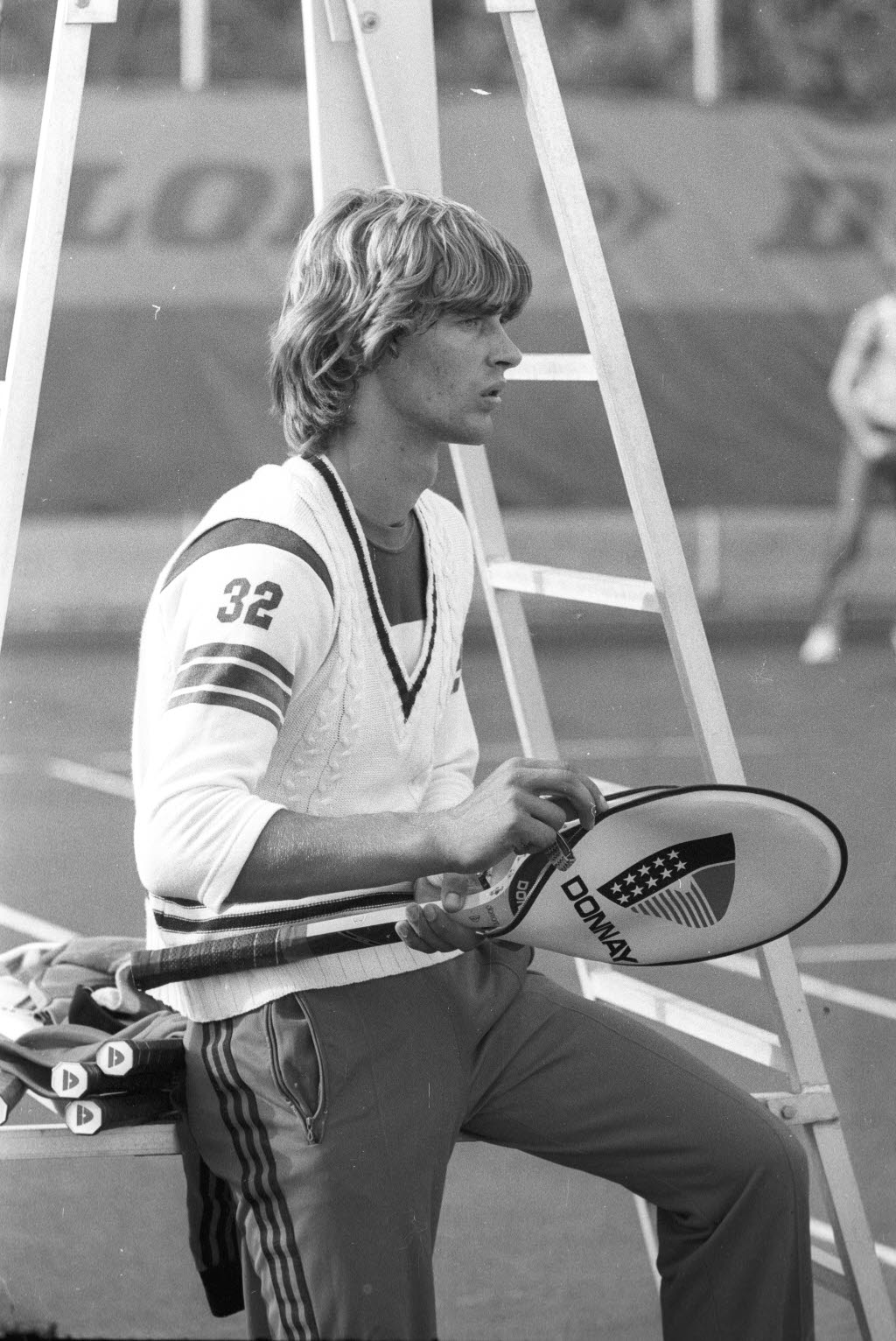
- Tennisturnier um den Galea-Cup
- Country (sports): West Germany
- Residence: Berlin/Hanover
- Born: 15 September 1957 (age 67); Datteln, West Germany
- Plays: Right-handed

Singles
- Career record: 53–74
- Career titles: 0
- Highest ranking: No. 104 (22 Dec 1980)

Grand Slam singles results
- French Open: 2R (1978, 1980, 1982)
- Wimbledon: 1R (1981)

Doubles
- Career record: 26–45
- Career titles: 2
- Highest ranking: No. 320 (3 Jan 1983)

Grand Slam doubles results
- Wimbledon: 1R (1981)

Klaus Eberhard (born 15 September 1957) is a former professional tennis player from West Germany.

== Career ==
Early in his career, Eberhard had his best performances in his home country. He was quarterfinalist at the Stuttgart Outdoor tournament in 1978 and reached the quarter-finals at Berlin the following year. The West German defeated Peter Elter to make second round of the 1978 French Open.

In 1980, he reached the semifinals of the BMW Open in Munich and again made the second round of the French Open, beating Spaniard José López-Maeso. He took part in a Davis Cup tie for the West German team that year, playing two singles rubbers against Swedish players Björn Borg and Kjell Johansson, which he both lost.

Eberhard was an Austrian Open and Tel Aviv Open semifinalist in 1981. Also that year, he reached the quarterfinals in Mexico City.

He defeated Mario Martinez in the first round of the 1982 French Open, then lost a five-set second-round match to John Lloyd. It would be his last win at a Grand Slam tournament.

In 1982, he was a quarterfinalist at the Cairo Open and made the semifinals in Linz.

He won two doubles titles during his career, in Nancy and Kitzbühel.

== Grand Prix career finals ==
=== Doubles: 2 (2–0) ===
| Result | W/L | Date | Tournament | Surface | Partner | Opponents | Score |
|---|---|---|---|---|---|---|---|
| Win | 1–0 | Mar 1979 | Nancy, France | Hard | (West Germany) Karl Meiler | (United Kingdom) Robin Drysdale (United Kingdom) Andrew Jarrett | 4–6, 7–6, 6–3 |
| Win | 2–0 | Jul 1980 | Kitzbühel, Austria | Clay | (West Germany) Ulrich Marten | (Brazil) Carlos Kirmayr (New Zealand) Chris Lewis | 6–4, 3–6, 6–4 |

== Challenger titles ==
=== Doubles: 1 ===
| No. | Year | Tournament | Surface | Partner | Opponents | Score |
|---|---|---|---|---|---|---|
| 1. | 1980 | Parioli, Italy | Clay | (West Germany) Ulrich Marten | (West Germany) Karl Meiler (West Germany) Werner Zirngibl | 3–6, 6–3, 7–5 |
