= David Carter (tennis) =

Australian tennis player

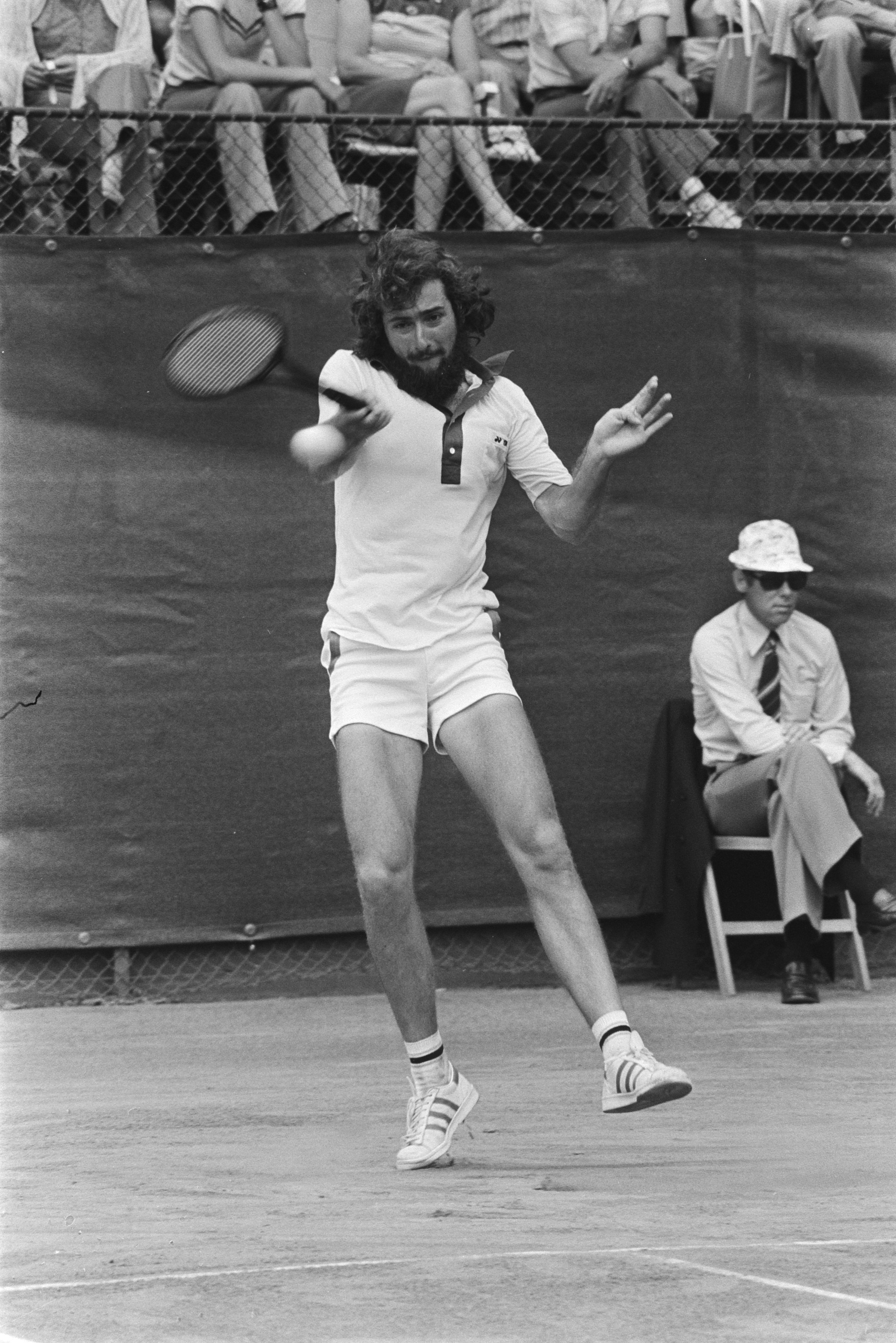
- David Carter playing at the 1978 Dutch Open.
- Country (sports): Australia
- Born: 21 April 1956 (age 68); Bundaberg, Queensland, Australia
- Height: 183 cm (6 ft 0 in)
- Plays: Right-handed

Singles
- Career record: 73–112
- Career titles: 0
- Highest ranking: No. 78 (15 February 1982)

Grand Slam singles results
- Australian Open: 2R (1976, 1979)
- French Open: 2R (1978, 1979)
- Wimbledon: 3R (1982)
- US Open: 3R (1981)

Doubles
- Career record: 85–100
- Career titles: 6
- Highest ranking: No. 126 (3 January 1983)

Grand Slam doubles results
- Australian Open: QF (1981)
- French Open: QF (1982)
- Wimbledon: 1R (1973, 1979, 1981, 1982)
- US Open: 3R (1981)

David Carter (born 21 April 1956) is a former professional tennis player from Australia. He enjoyed most of his tennis success while playing doubles. During his career, he won six doubles titles with compatriot Paul Kronk. He reached a highest singles ranking of world No. 78 in February 1982 and achieved his highest doubles ranking of world No. 126 in January 1983.

== Career finals ==
=== Singles (2 runner-ups) ===
Result	W-L	Date	Tournament	Surface	Opponent	Score
Loss	0–1	Mar 1981	Mexico City, Mexico	Clay	(Chile) Jaime Fillol	2–6, 3–6
Loss	0–2	Nov 1981	Quito, Ecuador	Clay	(United States) Eddie Dibbs	6–3, 0–6, 5–7

=== Doubles (6 titles, 7 runner-ups) ===
Result	W-L	Date	Tournament	Surface	Partner	Opponents	Score
Loss	0–1	Sep 1978	Bournemouth, UK	Clay	(Australia) Rod Frawley	(Netherlands) Louk Sanders (Netherlands) Rolf Thung	3–6, 4–6
Loss	0–2	Feb 1980	Sarasota, U.S.	Clay	(United States) Rick Fagel	(Ecuador) Andrés Gómez (Ecuador) Ricardo Ycaza	3–6, 4–6
Loss	0–3	May 1980	São Paulo, Brazil	Carpet	(New Zealand) Chris Lewis	(India) Anand Amritraj (United States) Fritz Buehning	6–7, 2–6
Loss	0–4	May 1980	Munich, West Germany	Clay	(New Zealand) Chris Lewis	(Switzerland) Heinz Günthardt (South Africa) Bob Hewitt	6–7, 1–6
Win	1–4	Jan 1981	Guarujá, Brasil	Hard	(Australia) Paul Kronk	(Spain) Ángel Giménez (Colombia) Jairo Velasco, Sr.	6–1, 7–6
Win	2–4	Feb 1981	Viña del Mar, Chile	Clay	(Australia) Paul Kronk	(Ecuador) Andrés Gómez (Chile) Belus Prajoux	6–1, 6–2
Win	3–4	Feb 1981	Mar del Plata, Argentina	Clay	(Australia) Paul Kronk	(Spain) Ángel Giménez (Colombia) Jairo Velasco Sr.	6–7, 6–4, 6–0
Loss	3–5	Mar 1981	Tampa, U.S.	Hard	(Australia) Paul Kronk	(South Africa) Bernard Mitton (United States) Butch Walts	3–6, 6–3, 1–6
Win	4–5	May 1981	Munich, West Germany	Clay	(Australia) Paul Kronk	(United States) Eric Fromm (Israel) Shlomo Glickstein	6–3, 6–4
Loss	4–6	Jul 1981	Gstaad, Switzerland	Clay	(Australia) Paul Kronk	(Switzerland) Heinz Günthardt (Switzerland) Markus Günthardt	4–6, 1–6
Win	5–6	Jul 1981	Kitzbühel, Austria	Clay	(Australia) Paul Kronk	(Socialist Federal Republic of Yugoslavia) Marko Ostoja (Netherlands) Louk Sanders	7–6, 6–1
Loss	5–7	Nov 1981	Quito, Ecuador	Clay	(Ecuador) Ricardo Ycaza	(Chile) Hans Gildemeister (Ecuador) Andrés Gómez	5–7, 3–6
Win	6–7	Mar 1982	Metz, France	Hard (i)	(Australia) Paul Kronk	(United States) Matt Doyle (United States) Dave Siegler	6–3, 7–6
