= Ángel Giménez =

Spanish tennis player (born 1955)

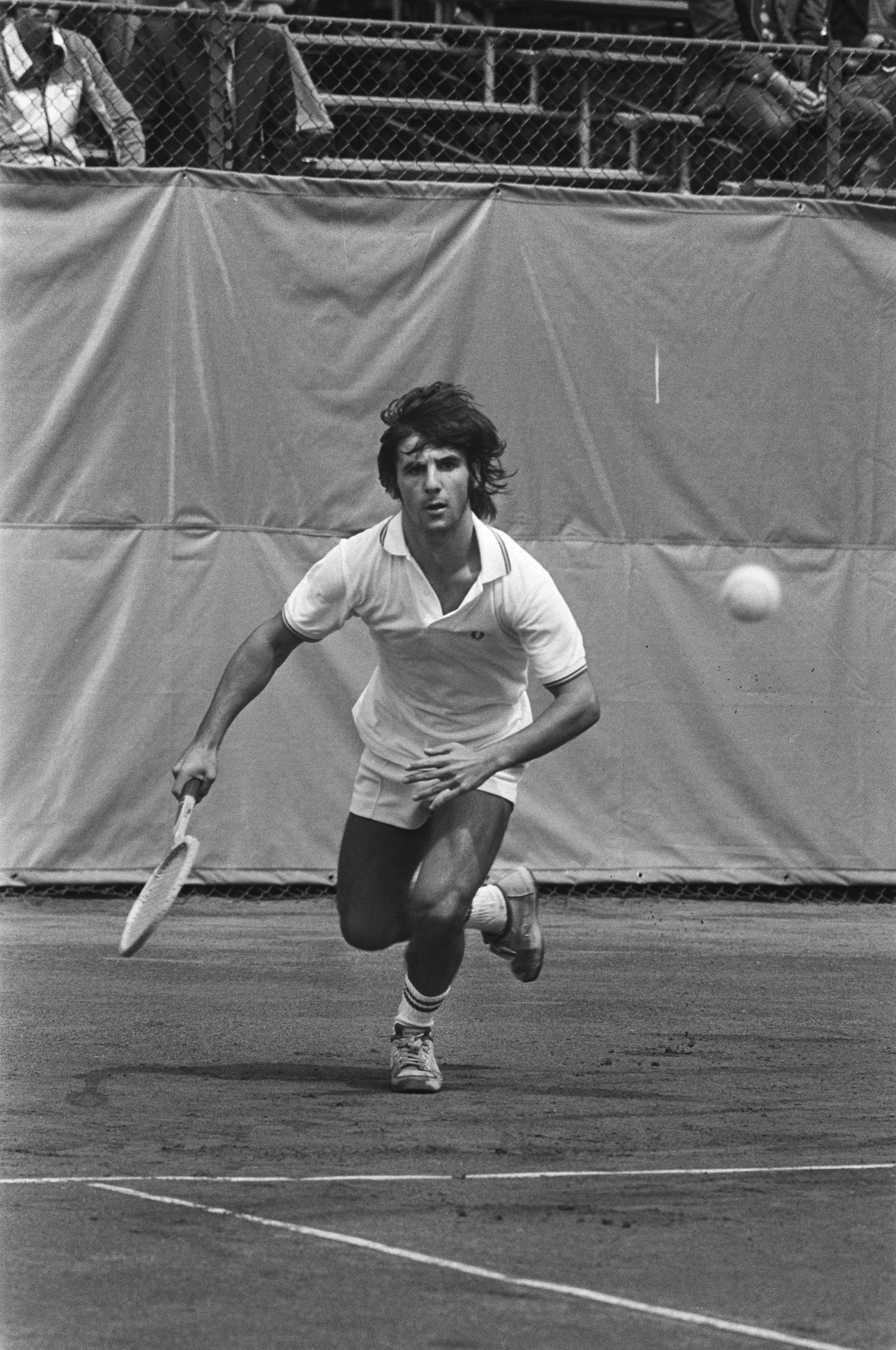
- Country (sports): Spain
- Born: 10 October 1955 (age 70) Barcelona, Spain
- Height: 1.63 m (5 ft 4 in)
- Plays: Right-handed

Singles
- Career record: 82–107
- Career titles: 2
- Highest ranking: No. 42 (31 December 1978)

Grand Slam singles results
- French Open: 2R (1981)
- Wimbledon: 2R (1981)

Doubles
- Career record: 45–94
- Career titles: 0
- Highest ranking: No. 145 (3 January 1983)

Grand Slam doubles results
- French Open: 2R (1981)
Medal record
Mediterranean Games
Gold medal – first place	1975 Algiers	Singles
Silver medal – second place	1975 Algiers	Doubles

Ángel Giménez (born 10 October 1955) is a former professional tennis player from Spain.

== Career ==
Giménez twice made the second round in the singles draw of a Grand Slam, both times in 1981. At the French Open he defeated Bolivian Mario Martinez, before losing to Paul Torre. Then at Wimbledon that year he had a win over Jörgen Windahl and was then beaten by Andrew Pattison in five sets. His best doubles performance came in the 1981 French Open, when he and Ricardo Cano reached the third round. He never competed in the Australian Open or US Open.

He won two titles on the Grand Prix tennis circuit, at Vienna in 1980 and then the British Hard Court Championships later that year. As a doubles player he reached three finals, but lost them all. He had one of the best wins of his career in 1981 when he defeated Vitas Gerulaitis at Hamburg.

In the Davis Cup, Giménez took part in seven ties for Spain, from 1976 to 1982. The Spaniard won six of his 10 rubbers, two in singles and four in doubles.

As a coach he has worked with many players, including Gabriela Sabatini, Arantxa Sanchez Vicario, Svetlana Kuznetsova and Daniela Hantuchová. He now works at the Academia Sanchez-Casal in Barcelona, Spain.

== Career finals ==
=== Singles: 3 (2–1) ===
Result	W/L	Date	Tournament	Surface	Opponent	Score
Win	1–0	Jun 1980	Vienna, Austria	Clay	(Czechoslovakia) Tomáš Šmíd	1–6, 1–1 ret.
Win	2–0	Sep 1980	Bournemouth, United Kingdom	Clay	(Israel) Shlomo Glickstein	3–6, 6–3, 6–3
Loss	2–1	Apr 1982	Bournemouth, United Kingdom	Clay	(Spain) Manuel Orantes	2–6, 0–6

=== Doubles: 3 (0–3) ===
Result	W/L	Date	Tournament	Surface	Partner	Opponents	Score
Loss	0–1	Feb 1981	Mar del Plata, Argentina	Clay	(Colombia) Jairo Velasco, Sr.	(Australia) David Carter (Australia) Paul Kronk	7–6, 4–6, 0–6
Loss	0–2	Jan 1982	Viña Del Mar, Chile	Clay	(Argentina) Guillermo Aubone	(Spain) Manuel Orantes (Mexico) Raúl Ramírez	Default
Loss	0–3	Feb 1982	Buenos Aires, Argentina	Clay	(Spain) Manuel Orantes	(Austria) Hans Kary (Hungary) Zoltan Kuharszky	5–7, 2–6
