= Rolf Gehring =

West German tennis player (born 1955)

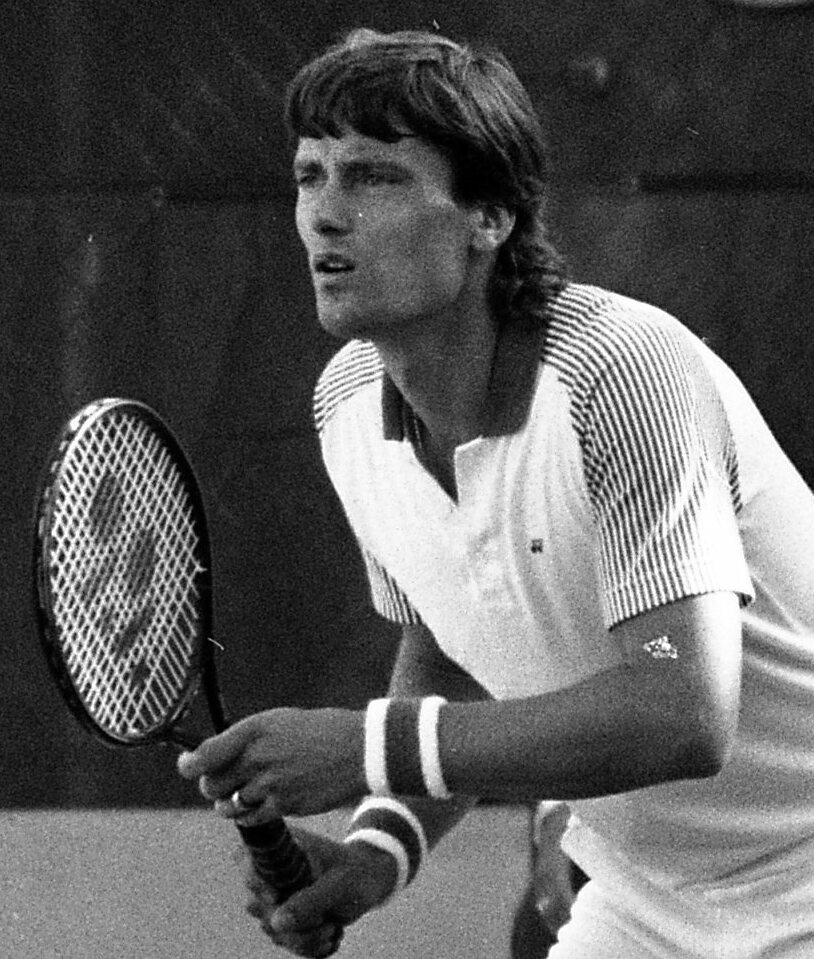
- Country (sports): West Germany
- Born: 25 November 1955 (age 69) Düsseldorf, West Germany
- Height: 1.85 m (6 ft 1 in)
- Plays: Right-handed
- Prize money: $355,057

Singles
- Career record: 119–140
- Career titles: 1
- Highest ranking: No. 30 (2 November 1981)

Grand Slam singles results
- Australian Open: 3R (1975)
- French Open: 4R (1977, 1978)
- Wimbledon: 3R (1981, 1984)
- US Open: 1R (1982)

Doubles
- Career record: 34–69
- Career titles: 0
- Highest ranking: No. 104 (4 January 1982)

Grand Slam doubles results
- Australian Open: QF (1976)

Rolf Gehring (born 25 November 1955) is a former professional tennis player from Germany. He achieved a career-high singles ranking of world No. 30 in November 1981.

Gehring participated in six Davis Cup ties for West Germany from 1979 to 1982, posting a 4–7 record in singles and a 1–2 record in doubles.

== Career singles finals ==
=== Titles (2) ===
Legend (singles)
Grand Slam (0)
ATP Tour (1)
Challengers (1)

No.	Date	Tournament	Surface	Opponent	Score
1.	1980	Munich	Clay	(France) Christophe Freyss	6–2, 0–6, 6–2, 6–2
2.	1983	Essen	Clay	(Spain) José López-Maeso	6–4, 6–3

=== Runner-ups (3) ===
No.	Date	Tournament	Surface	Opponent	Score
1.	1978	Bogotá	Clay	(Paraguay) Víctor Pecci	4–6, 6–3, 3–6, 3–6
2.	1980	Buenos Aires	Clay	(Argentina) José Luis Clerc	7–6, 6–2, 5–7, 0–6, 3–6
3.	1983	Travemünde	Clay	(West Germany) Michael Westphal	5–7, 2–6
