= 1981 Campionati Internazionali di Sicilia – Doubles =

Doubles
- 1981 Campionati Internazionali di Sicilia

Final
- Champions: (Uruguay) José Luis Damiani (Uruguay) Diego Pérez
- Runners-up: (Chile) Jaime Fillol (Chile) Belus Prajoux
- Score: 6–1, 6–4

Details
- Draw: 16
- Seeds: 4

Events
Singles	Doubles
← 1980 ·	Campionati Internazionali di Sicilia	· 1982 →

Ricardo Ycaza and Gianni Ocleppo were the defending champions, but none competed this year.

José Luis Damiani and Diego Pérez won the title by defeating Jaime Fillol and Belus Prajoux 6–1, 6–4 in the final.

== Seeds ==
1. (United States) Egan Adams / (South Africa) Craig Venter (quarterfinals)
2. (Chile) Jaime Fillol / (Chile) Belus Prajoux (final)
3. (Argentina) Ricardo Cano / (Paraguay) Víctor Pecci (first round)
4. (Uruguay) José Luis Damiani / (Uruguay) Diego Pérez (champions)

== Draw ==
=== Key ===
- Q = Qualifier
- WC = Wild card
- LL = Lucky loser
- Alt = Alternate
- SE = Special exempt
- PR = Protected ranking
- ITF = ITF entry
- JE = Junior exempt
- w/o = Walkover
- r = Retired
- d = Defaulted
- SR = Special ranking

=== Draw ===
First round
1	(United States) E Adams (South Africa) Craig Venter	6	6
(South Africa) R Chappell (South Africa) R Venter	2	3
(Argentina) C Castellan (Argentina) G Tiberti	6	6
(Sweden) J Nyström (Sweden) M Wilander	4	4
4	(Uruguay) JL Damiani (Uruguay) D Pérez	6	7
(United States) J Lapidus (Socialist Federal Republic of Yugoslavia) M Ostoja	1	5
(United States) E Iskersky (Sweden) J Norbäck	4	6	7
(South Africa) B Pirow (South Africa) W Prinsloo	6	3	5
(Chile) A Pierola (Chile) P Rebolledo	6	7
(United States) J Gurfein (Nigeria) N Odizor	3	6
(Peru) P Arraya (Spain) G Urpí	6	6
3	(Argentina) R Cano (Paraguay) V Pecci	4	3
(Bolivia) R Benavides (Bolivia) M Martínez	6	6	6
(United States) J Brown (Israel) S Perkiss	3	7	1
(Italy) Marco Consolini (Italy) Roberto Lombardi	1	2
2	(Chile) J Fillol (Chile) B Prajoux	6	6

Quarterfinals
1	(United States) E Adams (South Africa) Craig Venter	3	2
(Argentina) C Castellan (Argentina) G Tiberti	6	6
4	(Uruguay) JL Damiani (Uruguay) D Pérez	7	7
(United States) E Iskersky (Sweden) J Norbäck	6	6
(Chile) A Pierola (Chile) P Rebolledo	7	3	6
(Peru) P Arraya (Spain) G Urpí	6	6	3
(Bolivia) R Benavides (Bolivia) M Martínez	1	3
2	(Chile) J Fillol (Chile) B Prajoux	6	6

Semifinals
(Argentina) C Castellan (Argentina) G Tiberti	7	3	3
4	(Uruguay) JL Damiani (Uruguay) D Pérez	6	6	6
(Chile) A Pierola (Chile) P Rebolledo	4	3
2	(Chile) J Fillol (Chile) B Prajoux	6	6

Final
4	(Uruguay) JL Damiani (Uruguay) D Pérez	6	6
2	(Chile) J Fillol (Chile) B Prajoux	1	4
