= 1982 Campionati Internazionali di Sicilia – Singles =

Singles
- 1982 Campionati Internazionali di Sicilia

Final
- Champion: (Bolivia) Mario Martínez
- Runner-up: (Australia) John Alexander
- Score: 6–4, 7–5

Details
- Draw: 32 (4Q/1LL)
- Seeds: 8

Events
Singles	Doubles
← 1981 ·	Campionati Internazionali di Sicilia	· 1983 →

Manuel Orantes was the defending champion, but did not compete this year.

Mario Martínez won the title by defeating John Alexander 6–4, 7–5 in the final.

== Seeds ==
1. (n/a)
2. (Ecuador) Andrés Gómez (second round)
3. (Hungary) Balázs Taróczy (semifinals)
4. (Australia) John Alexander (final)
5. (Peru) Pablo Arraya (quarterfinals)
6. (Chile) Hans Gildemeister (second round)
7. (Italy) Corrado Barazzutti (first round)
8. (Spain) Fernando Luna (quarterfinals)

== Draw ==
=== Key ===
- Q = Qualifier
- WC = Wild card
- LL = Lucky loser
- Alt = Alternate
- ITF = ITF entry
- PR = Protected ranking
- SR = Special ranking
- SE = Special exempt
- JE = Junior exempt
- JR = Junior Accelerator Programme entrant
- CO = College Accelerator Programme entrant
- NG = Next Gen Accelerator Program entrant
- w/o = Walkover
- r = Retired
- d = Defaulted

=== Finals ===
Semifinals
(United States) Jimmy Brown	6	2	2
4	(Australia) John Alexander	4	6	6
3	(Hungary) Balázs Taróczy	6	2	1
(Bolivia) Mario Martínez	4	6	6

Final
4	(Australia) John Alexander	4	5
(Bolivia) Mario Martínez	6	7

=== Top half ===
First round
LL	(Spain) S Casal	6	4	2
(United States) J Brown	2	6	6
(Italy) F Cancellotti	1	6
(Italy) T Zugarelli	6	7
(Romania) F Segărceanu	1	1
(Italy) C Panatta	6	6
(Spain) J García Requena	6	1	6
7	(Italy) C Barazzutti	4	6	2
4	(Australia) J Alexander	6	6
(Socialist Federal Republic of Yugoslavia) Ž Franulović	3	1
Q	(Spain) M Mir	6	4	2
Q	(Argentina) M Jaite	0	6	6
(Uruguay) D Pérez	6	7
(Argentina) C Castellan	3	6
(Spain) Á Giménez	6	5	2
6	(Chile) H Gildemeister	2	7	6

Second round
(United States) J Brown	6	6
(Italy) T Zugarelli	3	4
(Italy) C Panatta	4	6	3
(Spain) J García Requena	6	2	6
4	(Australia) J Alexander	6	3	6
Q	(Argentina) M Jaite	3	6	4
(Uruguay) D Pérez	2	6	6
6	(Chile) H Gildemeister	6	4	3

Quarterfinals
(United States) J Brown	6	3
(Spain) J García Requena	1	0^{r}
4	(Australia) J Alexander	6	6
(Uruguay) D Pérez	1	2

Semifinals
(United States) J Brown	6	2	2
4	(Australia) J Alexander	4	6	6

=== Bottom half ===
First round
8	(Spain) F Luna	6	6
(United States) P Murphy	2	0
(Italy) A Panatta	2	5
(Spain) J Avendaño	6	7
(Chile) A Pierola	7	5	5
(Spain) J López-Maeso	5	7	7
(Spain) A Tous	4	4
3	(Hungary) B Taróczy	6	6
5	(Peru) P Arraya	6	6
Q	(Australia) T Allan	4	3
(Uruguay) JL Damiani	6	2	2
(Italy) G Rinaldini	4	6	6
Q	(Italy) G Ocleppo	6	6	3
(Bolivia) M Martínez	2	7	6
(Socialist Federal Republic of Yugoslavia) M Ostoja	7	2	0
2	(Ecuador) A Gómez	5	6	6

Second round
8	(Spain) F Luna	w/o
(Spain) J Avendaño
(Spain) J López-Maeso	6	5	3
3	(Hungary) B Taróczy	3	7	6
5	(Peru) P Arraya	5	6	6
(Italy) G Rinaldini	7	4	4
(Bolivia) M Martínez	6	6	7
2	(Ecuador) A Gómez	7	4	6

Quarterfinals
8	(Spain) F Luna	3	3
3	(Hungary) B Taróczy	6	6
5	(Peru) P Arraya	1	6
(Bolivia) M Martínez	6	7

Semifinals
3	(Hungary) B Taróczy	6	2	1
(Bolivia) M Martínez	4	6	6
