= 1981 Campionati Internazionali di Sicilia – Singles =

Singles
- 1981 Campionati Internazionali di Sicilia

Final
- Champion: (Spain) Manuel Orantes
- Runner-up: (Chile) Pedro Rebolledo
- Score: 6–4, 6–0, 6–0

Details
- Draw: 32 (3WC/4Q/2LL)
- Seeds: 8

Events
Singles	Doubles
← 1980 ·	Campionati Internazionali di Sicilia	· 1982 →

Guillermo Vilas was the defending champion, but did not compete this year.

Manuel Orantes won the title by defeating Pedro Rebolledo 6–4, 6–0, 6–0 in the final.

== Seeds ==
1. (Paraguay) Víctor Pecci (first round)
2. (Poland) Wojtek Fibak (quarterfinals)
3. (Italy) Adriano Panatta (first round, retired)
4. (Spain) José Higueras (semifinals)
5. (Uruguay) José Luis Damiani (second round)
6. (Argentina) Ricardo Cano (first round)
7. (Bolivia) Mario Martínez (quarterfinals)
8. (Italy) Corrado Barazzutti (semifinals)

== Draw ==
=== Key ===
- Q = Qualifier
- WC = Wild card
- LL = Lucky loser
- Alt = Alternate
- SE = Special exempt
- PR = Protected ranking
- ITF = ITF entry
- JE = Junior exempt
- w/o = Walkover
- r = Retired
- d = Defaulted
- SR = Special ranking

=== Finals ===
Semifinals
(Spain) Manuel Orantes	6	6
4	(Spain) José Higueras	2	3
(Chile) Pedro Rebolledo	6	7
8	(Italy) Corrado Barazzutti	3	6

Final
(Spain) Manuel Orantes	6	6	6
(Chile) Pedro Rebolledo	4	0	0

=== Top half ===
First round
1	(Paraguay) V Pecci	3	6	4
(Sweden) J Nyström	6	4	6
(United States) E Iskersky	6	2	1
(Chile) A Pierola	3	6	6
(Spain) M Orantes	3	6	7
(Sweden) J Norbäck	6	1	5
(Chile) B Prajoux	4	4
5	(Uruguay) JL Damiani	6	6
4	(Spain) J Higueras	6	6
(United States) E Adams	3	2
(Argentina) G Tiberti	1	4
(United States) J Brown	6	6
(United States) J Lapidus	6	2	7
(Italy) P Bertolucci	4	6	5
(Socialist Federal Republic of Yugoslavia) Ž Franulović	3	7	3
7	(Bolivia) M Martínez	6	5	6

Second round
(Sweden) J Nyström	2	1
(Chile) A Pierola	6	6
(Spain) M Orantes	7	3	6
5	(Uruguay) JL Damiani	6	6	1
4	(Spain) J Higueras	5	6	6
(United States) J Brown	7	3	3
(United States) J Lapidus	1	6	1
7	(Bolivia) M Martínez	6	3	6

Quarterfinals
(Chile) A Pierola	3	3
(Spain) M Orantes	6	6
4	(Spain) J Higueras	5	6	6
7	(Bolivia) M Martínez	7	2	1

Semifinals
(Spain) M Orantes	6	6
4	(Spain) J Higueras	2	3

=== Bottom half ===
First round
6	(Argentina) R Cano	6	2	6
(South Africa) R Chappell	1	6	7
(Italy) G Rinaldini	2	3
(Chile) J Fillol	6	6
(Peru) P Arraya	7	6
(Socialist Federal Republic of Yugoslavia) M Ostoja	5	3
(Chile) P Rebolledo	6	3
3	(Italy) A Panatta	3	0^{r}
8	(Italy) C Barazzutti	4	6	6
(Bolivia) R Benavides	6	4	1
(Argentina) C Castellan	3	6	4
(Sweden) M Wilander	6	3	6
(Spain) G Urpí	2	3
(United States) J Gurfein	6	6
(Uruguay) D Pérez	1	6
2	(Poland) W Fibak	6	7

Second round
(South Africa) R Chappell	2	0
(Chile) J Fillol	6	6
(Peru) P Arraya	4	3
(Chile) P Rebolledo	6	6
8	(Italy) C Barazzutti	6	7
(Sweden) M Wilander	1	6
(United States) J Gurfein	2	6	1
2	(Poland) W Fibak	6	3	6

Quarterfinals
(Chile) J Fillol	4	6	3
(Chile) P Rebolledo	6	1	6
8	(Italy) C Barazzutti	7	6
2	(Poland) W Fibak	5	1

Semifinals
(Chile) P Rebolledo	6	7
8	(Italy) C Barazzutti	3	6
