= 1982 Campionati Internazionali di Sicilia – Doubles =

Doubles
- 1982 Campionati Internazionali di Sicilia

Final
- Champions: (Italy) Gianni Marchetti (Italy) Enzo Vattuone
- Runners-up: (Uruguay) José Luis Damiani (Uruguay) Diego Pérez
- Score: 6–4, 6–7, 6–3

Details
- Draw: 16
- Seeds: 4

Events
Singles	Doubles
← 1981 ·	Campionati Internazionali di Sicilia	· 1983 →

José Luis Damiani and Diego Pérez were the defending champions, but lost in the final to Gianni Marchetti and Enzo Vattuone. The score was 6–4, 6–7, 6–3.

== Seeds ==
1. (Chile) Hans Gildemeister / (Ecuador) Andrés Gómez (quarterfinals)
2. (Uruguay) José Luis Damiani / (Uruguay) Diego Pérez (final)
3. (Spain) Sergio Casal / (Chile) Alejandro Pierola (first round)
4. (Argentina) Carlos Castellan / (Argentina) Alejandro Gattiker (first round)

== Draw ==
=== Key ===
- Q = Qualifier
- WC = Wild card
- LL = Lucky loser
- Alt = Alternate
- ITF = ITF entry
- PR = Protected ranking
- SR = Special ranking
- SE = Special exempt
- JE = Junior exempt
- JR = Junior Accelerator Programme entrant
- CO = College Accelerator Programme entrant
- NG = Next Gen Accelerator Program entrant
- w/o = Walkover
- r = Retired
- d = Defaulted

=== Draw ===
First round
1	(Chile) H Gildemeister (Ecuador) A Gómez	7	7
(Peru) P Arraya (Socialist Federal Republic of Yugoslavia) Ž Franulović	6	6
(Italy) A Panatta (Italy) C Panatta	6	6
(Italy) Massimo Grassotti (Italy) Vincenzo Naso	3	2
3	(Spain) S Casal (Chile) A Pierola	3	3
(United States) E Adams (United States) P Murphy	6	6
(Italy) G Marchetti (Italy) E Vattuone	6	2	6
(Italy) Marco Bellini (Italy) L Bottazzi	1	6	3
(Bolivia) M Martínez (Socialist Federal Republic of Yugoslavia) M Ostoja	6	6
(Spain) J García Requena (Italy) T Zugarelli	1	1
(Italy) M Alciati (Italy) G Rinaldini	7	7
4	(Argentina) C Castellan (Argentina) A Gattiker	6	5
(Spain) J López-Maeso (Spain) M Mir	w/o
(Spain) J Avendaño (Spain) F Soler
(Spain) Á Giménez (Italy) G Ocleppo	4	6	4
2	(Uruguay) JL Damiani (Uruguay) D Pérez	6	4	6

Quarterfinals
1	(Chile) H Gildemeister (Ecuador) A Gómez	4	4
(Italy) A Panatta (Italy) C Panatta	6	6
(United States) E Adams (United States) P Murphy	4	0
(Italy) G Marchetti (Italy) E Vattuone	6	6
(Bolivia) M Martínez (Socialist Federal Republic of Yugoslavia) M Ostoja	6	7
(Italy) M Alciati (Italy) G Rinaldini	2	6
(Spain) J López-Maeso (Spain) M Mir	4	6	4
2	(Uruguay) JL Damiani (Uruguay) D Pérez	6	4	6

Semifinals
(Italy) A Panatta (Italy) C Panatta	7	1	3
(Italy) G Marchetti (Italy) E Vattuone	6	6	6
(Bolivia) M Martínez (Socialist Federal Republic of Yugoslavia) M Ostoja	6	6	2
2	(Uruguay) JL Damiani (Uruguay) D Pérez	7	3	6

Final
(Italy) G Marchetti (Italy) E Vattuone	6	6	6
2	(Uruguay) JL Damiani (Uruguay) D Pérez	4	7	3
