= 1981 Torneo Godó – Singles =

Singles
- 1981 Torneo Godó

Final
- Champion: (Czechoslovakia) Ivan Lendl
- Runner-up: (Argentina) Guillermo Vilas
- Score: 6–0, 6–3, 6–0

Details
- Draw: 64
- Seeds: 16

Events
Singles	Doubles
- Barcelona Open

Ivan Lendl successfully defended his title, by defeating Guillermo Vilas 6–0, 6–3, 6–0 in the final.

== Seeds ==
1. (Czechoslovakia) Ivan Lendl (champion)
2. (Argentina) Guillermo Vilas (final)
3. (Paraguay) Víctor Pecci (third round)
4. (France) Yannick Noah (semifinals)
5. (Hungary) Balázs Taróczy (quarterfinals)
6. (Italy) Adriano Panatta (quarterfinals)
7. (Czechoslovakia) Tomáš Šmíd (quarterfinals)
8. (Spain) José Higueras (second round)
9. (Chile) Hans Gildemeister (third round)
10. (Uruguay) José Luis Damiani (third round)
11. (United States) Eddie Dibbs (semifinals)
12. (Spain) Manuel Orantes (third round)
13. (Ecuador) Andrés Gómez (third round)
14. (Ecuador) Ricardo Ycaza (first round)
15. (Chile) Pedro Rebolledo (quarterfinals)
16. (Italy) Corrado Barazzutti (third round)

Click on the seed number of a player to go to their draw section.

== Draw ==
Key

- Q = Qualifier
- WC = Wild card
- LL = Lucky loser
- Alt = Alternate
- ITF = ITF entry
- PR = Protected ranking
- SR = Special ranking
- SE = Special exempt
- JE = Junior exempt
- JR = Junior Accelerator Programme entrant
- CO = College Accelerator Programme entrant
- NG = Next Gen Accelerator Program entrant
- w/o = Walkover
- r = Retired
- d = Defaulted

=== Finals ===
Quarterfinals
1	(Czechoslovakia) Ivan Lendl	6	3	6
6	(Italy) Adriano Panatta	3	6	2
4	(France) Yannick Noah	6	6
7	(Czechoslovakia) Tomáš Šmíd	2	4
11	(United States) Eddie Dibbs	1	6	6
15	(Chile) Pedro Rebolledo	6	3	2
5	(Hungary) Balázs Taróczy	1	1
2	(Argentina) Guillermo Vilas	6	6

Semifinals
1	(Czechoslovakia) Ivan Lendl	6	6
4	(France) Yannick Noah	0	3
11	(United States) Eddie Dibbs	6	4	2
2	(Argentina) Guillermo Vilas	1	6	6

Final
1	(Czechoslovakia) Ivan Lendl	6	6	6
2	(Argentina) Guillermo Vilas	0	3	0

=== Top half ===
==== Section 1 ====
First round
1	(Czechoslovakia) I Lendl	6	6
(Sweden) H Sundström	3	0
(United States) E Fromm	3	3
(France) D Bedel	6	6
(Spain) J Soler	6	6	3
(Bolivia) R Benavides	3	7	6
(Argentina) G Aubone	4	6
12	(Spain) M Orantes	6	7
16	(Italy) C Barazzutti	4	6	6
(Chile) J Fillol	6	4	2
(Spain) L Fargas	1	3
(Spain) S Casal	6	6
(France) P Torre	6	2
(Switzerland) R Stadler	7	6
(France) G Goven	3	6
6	(Italy) A Panatta	6	7

Second round
1	(Czechoslovakia) I Lendl	6	7
(France) D Bedel	3	5
(Bolivia) R Benavides	0	1
12	(Spain) M Orantes	6	6
16	(Italy) C Barazzutti	6	6
(Spain) S Casal	3	2
(Switzerland) R Stadler	1	3
6	(Italy) A Panatta	6	6

Third round
1	(Czechoslovakia) I Lendl	6	6
12	(Spain) M Orantes	1	2
16	(Italy) C Barazzutti	4	3
6	(Italy) A Panatta	6	6

Quarterfinals
1	(Czechoslovakia) I Lendl	6	3	6
6	(Italy) A Panatta	3	6	2

==== Section 2 ====
First round
4	(France) Y Noah	6	6
(Brazil) J Soares	1	4
(Argentina) G Tiberti	6	4	5
(United States) B Martin	2	6	7
(Czechoslovakia) S Birner	6	6
(Spain) A Munoz	0	2
(Spain) Antonio Capella	4	4
9	(Chile) H Gildemeister	6	6
14	(Ecuador) R Ycaza	6	1	2
(Spain) A Gimenez	3	6	6
(Peru) P Arraya	4	2
(United States) J Lapidus	6	6
(Spain) J Avendaño	3	3
(Spain) J Lopez-Maeso	6	6
(Uruguay) D Pérez	6	6	0
7	(Czechoslovakia) T Šmid	3	7	6

Second round
4	(France) Y Noah	6	6
(United States) B Martin	4	1
(Czechoslovakia) S Birner	2	4
9	(Chile) H Gildemeister	6	6
(Spain) A Gimenez	6	4	8
(United States) J Lapidus	4	6	6
(Spain) J Lopez-Maeso	0	1^{r}
7	(Czechoslovakia) T Šmid	6	4

Third round
4	(France) Y Noah	6	7
9	(Chile) H Gildemeister	4	5
(Spain) A Gimenez	1	1
7	(Czechoslovakia) T Šmid	6	6

Quarterfinals
4	(France) Y Noah	6	6
7	(Czechoslovakia) T Šmid	2	4

=== Bottom half ===
==== Section 3 ====
First round
8	(Spain) J Higueras	4	6	3
(Sweden) H Simonsson	6	1	0^{r}
(Czechoslovakia) P Složil	6	6
(Sweden) J Nyström	2	2
(Czechoslovakia) J Hřebec	2	2
(Sweden) J Gunnarsson	6	6
(South Africa) R Moore	3	0
11	(United States) E Dibbs	6	6
15	(Chile) P Rebolledo	2	6	6
(Spain) M Mir	6	1	3
(France) C Roger-Vasselin	1	3
(Germany) W Zirngibl	6	6
(Spain) R Vizcaíno	4	4
(Chile) B Prajoux	6	6
(Spain) F Soler	0	2
3	(Paraguay) V Pecci	6	6

Second round
8	(Spain) J Higueras	4	6	2
(Czechoslovakia) P Složil	6	1	6
(Sweden) J Gunnarsson	1	6	0^{r}
11	(United States) E Dibbs	6	4	4
15	(Chile) P Rebolledo	6	0
(Germany) W Zirngibl	2	0^{r}
(Chile) B Prajoux	1	4
3	(Paraguay) V Pecci	6	6

Third round
(Czechoslovakia) P Složil	0	2
11	(United States) E Dibbs	6	6
15	(Chile) P Rebolledo	6	6
3	(Paraguay) V Pecci	0	3

Quarterfinals
11	(United States) E Dibbs	1	6	6
15	(Chile) P Rebolledo	6	3	2

==== Section 4 ====
First round
5	(Hungary) B Taróczy	6	6
(Croatia) M Ostoja	4	4
(Spain) F Luna	6	6
(Chile) A Pierola	1	0
(Italy) P Bertolucci	6	7
(Germany) W Popp	2	5
(Argentina) C Castellan	3	4
10	(Uruguay) J-L Damiani	6	6
13	(Ecuador) A Gómez	3	7	6
(Sweden) A Järryd	6	6	1
(United States) F McNair	7	6
(France) J Potier	6	4
(United States) M Dickson	5	6	3
(Italy) C Panatta	7	3	6
(Spain) G Urpí	1	1
2	(Argentina) G Vilas	6	6

Second round
5	(Hungary) B Taróczy	7	6
(Spain) F Luna	6	2
(Italy) P Bertolucci	4	6	7
10	(Uruguay) J-L Damiani	6	4	9
13	(Ecuador) A Gómez	6	6
(United States) F McNair	1	2
(Italy) C Panatta	1	0
2	(Argentina) G Vilas	6	6

Third round
5	(Hungary) B Taróczy	6	7
10	(Uruguay) J-L Damiani	4	5
13	(Ecuador) A Gómez	3	6
2	(Argentina) G Vilas	6	7

Quarterfinals
5	(Hungary) B Taróczy	1	1
2	(Argentina) G Vilas	6	6
