= 1981 Torneo Godó – Doubles =

Doubles
- 1981 Torneo Godó

Final
- Champions: (Sweden) Anders Järryd (Sweden) Hans Simonsson
- Runners-up: (Chile) Hans Gildemeister (Ecuador) Andrés Gómez
- Score: 6–1, 6–4

Details
- Draw: 32
- Seeds: 8

Events
Singles	Doubles
- Barcelona Open

Steve Denton and Ivan Lendl were the defending champions, but none competed this year. Lendl opted to focus on the singles tournament.

Anders Järryd and Hans Simonsson won the title by defeating Hans Gildemeister and Andrés Gómez 6–1, 6–4 in the final.

== Seeds ==
1. (Switzerland) Heinz Günthardt / (Hungary) Balázs Taróczy (semifinals)
2. (Chile) Hans Gildemeister / (Ecuador) Andrés Gómez (final)
3. (Czechoslovakia) Pavel Složil / (Czechoslovakia) Tomáš Šmíd (semifinals)
4. (Italy) Paolo Bertolucci / (Italy) Adriano Panatta (quarterfinals)
5. (United States) Fred McNair / (South Africa) Ray Moore (first round)
6. (Switzerland) Markus Günthardt / (United States) Billy Martin (first round)
7. (Uruguay) José Luis Damiani / (Ecuador) Ricardo Ycaza (quarterfinals)
8. (Sweden) Anders Järryd / (Sweden) Hans Simonsson (champions)

== Draw ==
Key

- Q = Qualifier
- WC = Wild card
- LL = Lucky loser
- Alt = Alternate
- ITF = ITF entry
- PR = Protected ranking
- SR = Special ranking
- SE = Special exempt
- JE = Junior exempt
- JR = Junior Accelerator Programme entrant
- CO = College Accelerator Programme entrant
- NG = Next Gen Accelerator Program entrant
- w/o = Walkover
- r = Retired
- d = Defaulted

=== Finals ===
Semifinals
1	(Switzerland) Heinz Günthardt (Hungary) Balázs Taróczy	3	4
8	(Sweden) Anders Järryd (Sweden) Hans Simonsson	6	6
3	(Czechoslovakia) Pavel Složil (Czechoslovakia) Tomáš Šmíd	6	2
2	(Chile) Hans Gildemeister (Ecuador) Andrés Gómez	7	6

Final
8	(Sweden) Anders Järryd (Sweden) Hans Simonsson	6	6
2	(Chile) Hans Gildemeister (Ecuador) Andrés Gómez	1	4

=== Top half ===
First round
1	(Switzerland) H Günthardt (Hungary) B Taróczy	6	6
(Spain) J Higueras (Spain) A Munoz	4	2
(Chile) Á Fillol (Chile) J Fillol	6	6
(Spain) J Lopez-Maeso (Spain) M Mir	1	1
(Spain) F Ferrer (Spain) A Tous	3	7	6
(United States) E Fromm (United States) J Lapidus	6	5	2
(Sweden) J Nyström (Sweden) M Tideman	6	5	6
6	(Switzerland) M Günthardt (United States) B Martin	4	7	3
4	(Italy) P Bertolucci (Italy) A Panatta	6	6
(South Africa) R Chappell (Sweden) J Gunnarsson	4	2
(Bolivia) R Benavides (Brazil) J Soares	2	6	6
(Spain) S Casal (Spain) A Gimenez	6	4	4
(United Kingdom) J Bates (United Kingdom) N Sears	6	6
(Argentina) C Castellan (Argentina) G Tiberti	3	3
(Spain) F Luna (Spain) R Vizcaíno	3	1
8	(Sweden) A Järryd (Sweden) H Simonsson	6	6

Second round
1	(Switzerland) H Günthardt (Hungary) B Taróczy	4	6	6
(Chile) Á Fillol (Chile) J Fillol	6	4	4
(Spain) F Ferrer (Spain) A Tous	7	6
(Sweden) J Nyström (Sweden) M Tideman	5	2
4	(Italy) P Bertolucci (Italy) A Panatta	6	7
(Bolivia) R Benavides (Brazil) J Soares	2	5
(United Kingdom) J Bates (United Kingdom) N Sears	2	4
8	(Sweden) A Järryd (Sweden) H Simonsson	6	6

Quarterfinals
1	(Switzerland) H Günthardt (Hungary) B Taróczy	6	7
(Spain) F Ferrer (Spain) A Tous	0	5
4	(Italy) P Bertolucci (Italy) A Panatta	7	1	3
8	(Sweden) A Järryd (Sweden) H Simonsson	5	6	6

Semifinals
1	(Switzerland) H Günthardt (Hungary) B Taróczy	3	4
8	(Sweden) A Järryd (Sweden) H Simonsson	6	6

=== Bottom half ===
First round
5	(United States) F McNair (South Africa) R Moore	2	6	4
(United States) M Dickson (Switzerland) R Stadler	6	2	6
(France) D Bedel (France) C Roger-Vasselin	6	6
(Spain) L Fargas (Spain) J Soler	4	2
(Argentina) G Aubone (Czechoslovakia) S Birner	6	6
(Spain) J Avendaño (Argentina) J Todero	2	2
(Sweden) H Sundström (United States) J Van Nostrand	2	2
3	(Czechoslovakia) P Složil (Czechoslovakia) T Šmid	6	6
7	(Uruguay) J-L Damiani (Ecuador) R Ycaza	6	7
(Italy) C Panatta (Uruguay) D Pérez	1	6
(Germany) W Popp (Germany) W Zirngibl	6	6
(Spain) P (Chile) A Pierola	1	4
(Switzerland) I Dupasquier (Belgium) J Vanlangendonck	7	7
(Spain) J Duarte de Ochoa (Spain) J Torralbo	6	5
(Peru) P Arraya (Spain) G Urpí	3	2
2	(Chile) H Gildemeister (Ecuador) A Gómez	6	6

Second round
(United States) M Dickson (Switzerland) R Stadler	6	6
(France) D Bedel (France) C Roger-Vasselin	3	3
(Argentina) G Aubone (Czechoslovakia) S Birner	2	1
3	(Czechoslovakia) P Složil (Czechoslovakia) T Šmid	6	6
7	(Uruguay) J-L Damiani (Ecuador) R Ycaza	w/o
(Germany) W Popp (Germany) W Zirngibl
(Switzerland) I Dupasquier (Belgium) J Vanlangendonck	4	2
2	(Chile) H Gildemeister (Ecuador) A Gómez	6	6

Quarterfinals
(United States) M Dickson (Switzerland) R Stadler	3	1
3	(Czechoslovakia) P Složil (Czechoslovakia) T Šmid	6	6
7	(Uruguay) J-L Damiani (Ecuador) R Ycaza	6	1	2
2	(Chile) H Gildemeister (Ecuador) A Gómez	4	6	6

Semifinals
3	(Czechoslovakia) P Složil (Czechoslovakia) T Šmid	6	2
2	(Chile) H Gildemeister (Ecuador) A Gómez	7	6
