= 1983 French Open – Men's singles =

Men's singles
- 1983 French Open

Final
- Champion: (France) Yannick Noah
- Runner-up: (Sweden) Mats Wilander
- Score: 6–2, 7–5, 7–6^{(7–3)}

Details
- Draw: 128
- Seeds: 16

Events
Singles	men	women		boys	girls
Doubles	men	women	mixed	boys	girls
WC Singles	men	women	quad
WC Doubles	men	women	quad
Legends	−45	45+	women
- French Open

Yannick Noah defeated defending champion Mats Wilander in the final, 6–2, 7–5, 7–6^{(7–3)} to win the men's singles tennis title at the 1983 French Open. It was his first and only major singles title. Noah remains the most recent Frenchman to win the title, and his victory marked the last time a man won a singles major with a wooden racket.

== Seeds ==
The seeded players are listed below. Yannick Noah is the champion; others show the round in which they were eliminated.

1. (United States) Jimmy Connors (quarterfinals)
2. (United States) John McEnroe (quarterfinals)
3. (Czechoslovakia) Ivan Lendl (quarterfinals)
4. (Argentina) Guillermo Vilas (quarterfinals)
5. (Sweden) Mats Wilander (final)
6. (France) Yannick Noah (champion)
7. (Argentina) José Luis Clerc (second round)
8. (Spain) José Higueras (semifinals)
9. (United States) Vitas Gerulaitis (first round)
10. (United States) Eliot Teltscher (fourth round)
11. (United States) Jimmy Arias (fourth round)
12. (United States) Brian Gottfried (fourth round)
13. (Poland) Wojtek Fibak (first round)
14. (Sweden) Henrik Sundström (fourth round)
15. (Czechoslovakia) Tomáš Šmíd (second round)
16. (Ecuador) Andrés Gómez (fourth round)

== Draw ==
Key

- Q = Qualifier
- WC = Wild card
- LL = Lucky loser
- Alt = Alternate
- ITF = ITF entry
- PR = Protected ranking
- SR = Special ranking
- SE = Special exempt
- JE = Junior exempt
- JR = Junior Accelerator Programme entrant
- CO = College Accelerator Programme entrant
- NG = Next Gen Accelerator Program entrant
- w/o = Walkover
- r = Retired
- d = Defaulted

=== Finals ===
Quarterfinals
1	(United States) Jimmy Connors	4	4	6
(France) Christophe Roger-Vasselin	6	6	7
3	(Czechoslovakia) Ivan Lendl	6	2	7	0
6	(France) Yannick Noah	7	6	5	6
8	(Spain) José Higueras	6	6	6	4	6
4	(Argentina) Guillermo Vilas	2	7	1	6	1
5	(Sweden) Mats Wilander	1	6	6	6
2	(United States) John McEnroe	6	2	4	0

Semifinals
(France) Christophe Roger-Vasselin	3	0	0
6	(France) Yannick Noah	6	6	6
8	(Spain) José Higueras	5	7	3	0
5	(Sweden) Mats Wilander	7	6	6	6

Final
6	(France) Yannick Noah	6	7	7^{7}
5	(Sweden) Mats Wilander	2	5	6^{3}

=== Top half ===
==== Section 1 ====
First round
1	(United States) J Connors	6	6	6
(Australia) C A.Miller	2	2	1
(Hungary) Z Kuhárszky	3	3	7	6	5
(Australia) P McNamee	6	6	5	3	7
(Colombia) J Velasco Sr.	6	3	6	6
(New Zealand) C Lewis	3	6	0	3
(Chile) H Gildemeister	3	1	6	6	6
(Brazil) J Góes	6	6	2	2	5^{r}
(Belgium) B Boileau	7	1	5	6	6
(Sweden) P Hjertquist	5	6	7	1	4
(United States) E Fromm	3	7	6	6
Q	(United Kingdom) J Lloyd	6	6	2	3
(West Germany) U Pinner	2	1	4
(Peru) P Arraya	6	6	6
Q	(Italy) C Panatta	1	6	3	6	1
15	(Czechoslovakia) T Šmid	6	3	6	1	6

Second round
1	(United States) J Connors	6	6	6
(Australia) P McNamee	4	4	3
(Colombia) J Velasco Sr.	4	6	1	7	1
(Chile) H Gildemeister	6	1	6	5	6
(Belgium) B Boileau	4	4	2
(United States) E Fromm	6	6	6
(Peru) P Arraya	6	6	3	6
15	(Czechoslovakia) T Šmid	1	4	6	4

Third round
1	(United States) J Connors	6	6	5	6
(Chile) H Gildemeister	3	1	7	1
(United States) E Fromm	2	6	6	6
(Peru) P Arraya	6	4	4	1

Fourth round
1	(United States) J Connors	6	6	6
(United States) E Fromm	2	1	1

==== Section 2 ====
First round
13	(Poland) W Fibak	5	6	6	3
(France) B Fritz	7	7	4	6
(France) C Roger-Vasselin	6	6	6
Q	(Monaco) B Balleret	4	3	3
(Switzerland) H Günthardt	2	6	6	6
(United States) J Brown	6	3	3	2
(Czechoslovakia) P Složil	6	6	6
(Paraguay) F González	2	4	2
(France) P Portes	6	5	3	6	6
(South Africa) F Sauer	4	7	6	1	4
(United States) B Manson	6	5	6	4	3
(United States) M De Palmer	2	7	3	6	6
(Spain) F Luna	6	6	6
(Argentina) A Ganzábal	2	2	4
(Czechoslovakia) L Pimek	6	6	3	1
7	(Argentina) J L Clerc	3	7	6	6

Second round
(France) B Fritz	7	4	2	1
(France) C Roger-Vasselin	5	6	6	6
(Switzerland) H Günthardt	7	6	6
(Czechoslovakia) P Složil	6	3	1
(France) P Portes	1	3	2
(United States) M De Palmer	6	6	6
(Spain) F Luna	6	6	6
7	(Argentina) J L Clerc	2	1	1

Third round
(France) C Roger-Vasselin	3	4	7	6	6
(Switzerland) H Günthardt	6	6	6	3	1
(United States) M De Palmer	1	6	5	0
(Spain) F Luna	6	4	7	6

Fourth round
(France) C Roger-Vasselin	6	6	1	6
(Spain) F Luna	2	3	6	1

==== Section 3 ====
First round
3	(Czechoslovakia) I Lendl	6	6	6
Q	(Chile) P Rebolledo	4	1	3
(Spain) S Casal	2	6	6	6	12
(Czechoslovakia) S Birner	6	4	2	7	10
(Bolivia) M Martinez	6	6	6
(Socialist Federal Republic of Yugoslavia) Z Franulović	3	1	4
(West Germany) A Maurer	6	7	6
(West Germany) K Meiler	2	5	3
(United States) T Waltke	5	6	3	7	5
(Sweden) M Tideman	7	1	6	5	7
(United States) M S Strode	3	1	1
(Spain) M Orantes	6	6	6
(France) L Courteau	6	2	3
(United States) M Dickson	7	6	6
(Netherlands) M Schapers	6	6	6	3
12	(United States) B Gottfried	4	7	7	6

Second round
3	(Czechoslovakia) I Lendl	6	6	6
(Spain) S Casal	2	2	2
(Bolivia) M Martinez	6	6	1	6
(West Germany) A Maurer	4	1	6	4
(Sweden) M Tideman	6	6	1	6
(Spain) M Orantes	3	3	6	3
(United States) M Dickson	6	6	6	3	1
12	(United States) B Gottfried	4	2	7	6	6

Third round
3	(Czechoslovakia) I Lendl	6	6	3	6
(Bolivia) M Martinez	0	2	6	0
(Sweden) M Tideman	6	3	0	0
12	(United States) B Gottfried	3	6	6	6

Fourth round
3	(Czechoslovakia) I Lendl	7	6	6
12	(United States) B Gottfried	6	4	3

==== Section 4 ====
First round
9	(United States) V Gerulaitis	4	4	6	1
(Sweden) H Simonsson	6	6	2	6
(Italy) G Rinaldini	2	1	0
(Australia) J Alexander	6	6	6
(United States) T Cain	1	4	3
(United States) M Purcell	6	6	6
(France) G Forget	6	6	6	4
(Australia) W Masur	7	3	2	6
(United States) P DuPré	1	6	7	6
(United States) B Foxworth	6	2	5	2
(Argentina) G Tiberti	6	0	3	4
(West Germany) D Keretić	4	6	6	6
(Paraguay) V Pecci Sr.	6	6	6
(United States) M Mitchell	4	2	2
(Sweden) A Järryd	1	0	2
6	(France) Y Noah	6	6	6

Second round
(Sweden) H Simonsson	6	7	6	6	4
(Australia) J Alexander	7	6	7	1	6
(United States) M Purcell	6	6	6
(Australia) W Masur	2	3	3
(United States) P DuPré	6	0	6	6
(West Germany) D Keretić	2	6	2	2
(Paraguay) V Pecci Sr.	4	3	3
6	(France) Y Noah	6	6	6

Third round
(Australia) J Alexander	4	6	6	6	6
(United States) M Purcell	6	1	3	7	3
(United States) P DuPré	5	6	2
6	(France) Y Noah	7	7	6

Fourth round
(Australia) J Alexander	2	6	1
6	(France) Y Noah	6	7	6

=== Bottom half ===
==== Section 5 ====
First round
8	(Spain) J Higueras	7	6	6
(Brazil) C Kirmayr	5	2	2
(United States) C Hooper	3	0	0
(France) H Leconte	6	6	6
(Brazil) J Soares	2	5	6	3
(Chile) J Fillol Sr.	6	7	2	6
(West Germany) P Elter	6	3	7	4	6
(United States) M Doyle	2	6	5	6	2
(United States) P Murphy	6	2	4	4
(Israel) S Glickstein	3	6	6	6
(Sweden) J Gunnarsson	6	7	4	6	6
Q	(Spain) J Aguilera	7	6	6	2	4
(South Africa) D Visser	6	6	6
(South Africa) F Punčec	3	1	4
(United States) A Andrews	1	1	6
16	(Ecuador) A Gómez	6	6	7

Second round
8	(Spain) J Higueras	6	6	6
(France) H Leconte	4	4	4
(Chile) J Fillol Sr.	6	6	6
(West Germany) P Elter	3	4	4
(Israel) S Glickstein	6	6	6
(Sweden) J Gunnarsson	2	3	4
(South Africa) D Visser	5	5	7	4
16	(Ecuador) A Gómez	7	7	5	6

Third round
8	(Spain) J Higueras	6	6	6
(Chile) J Fillol Sr.	4	2	4
(Israel) S Glickstein	6	5	3	6	4
16	(Ecuador) A Gómez	4	7	6	3	6

Fourth round
8	(Spain) J Higueras	7	6	7
16	(Ecuador) A Gómez	6	4	6

==== Section 6 ====
First round
11	(United States) J Arias	6	7	6	6
(Australia) P Cash	7	6	1	1
(Australia) J Fitzgerald	5	6	1	7	6
(United States) B Gilbert	7	1	6	5	2
(Uruguay) J L Damiani	3	0	6	4
(France) T Tulasne	6	6	2	6
Q	(Argentina) C Gattiker	6	3	7	4
(Brazil) M Hocevar	3	6	5	6
Q	(France) J Hervet	0	4	2
(Romania) I Năstase	6	6	6
(Sweden) T Högstedt	1	6	4	6	6
Q	(Argentina) R Cano	6	1	6	2	1
Q	(South Africa) M Myburg	4	6	6	6
(United States) T Mayotte	6	0	4	2
(Romania) F Segărceanu	1	5	1
4	(Argentina) G Vilas	6	7	6

Second round
11	(United States) J Arias	7	0	7	6
(Australia) J Fitzgerald	5	6	6	4
(France) T Tulasne	3	1	1
(Brazil) M Hocevar	6	6	6
(Romania) I Năstase	7	6	1	6
(Sweden) T Högstedt	6	1	6	1
Q	(South Africa) M Myburg	2	1	1
4	(Argentina) G Vilas	6	6	6

Third round
11	(United States) J Arias	7	0	7	6
(Brazil) M Hocevar	5	6	6	4
(Romania) I Năstase	1	2	1
4	(Argentina) G Vilas	6	6	6

Fourth round
11	(United States) J Arias	5	3	2
4	(Argentina) G Vilas	7	6	6

==== Section 7 ====
First round
5	(Sweden) M Wilander	4	6	6	2
(Spain) J Avendaño	6	2	0	1	r
Q	(Australia) S Youl	4	1	6	6	2
(France) C Bernelle	6	6	3	4	6
(Uruguay) D Pérez	6	6	6	6
(Brazil) C Motta	7	1	1	2
(France) D Bedel	6	6	7
(France) J Potier	2	4	5
Q	(France) F Errard	1	4	5
(Sweden) J Nyström	6	6	7
(Sweden) S Simonsson	4	2	0
Q	(Australia) T Allan	6	6	6
(South Africa) E Edwards	3	6	6	7
Q	(United Kingdom) J Feaver	6	2	3	6
(Chile) R Acuña	4	2	6
14	(Sweden) H Sundström	6	6	7

Second round
5	(Sweden) M Wilander	6	6	6
(France) C Bernelle	1	1	3
(Uruguay) D Pérez	4	0	3
(France) D Bedel	6	6	6
(Sweden) J Nyström	6	6	6
Q	(Australia) T Allan	3	3	2
(South Africa) E Edwards	1	4	0
14	(Sweden) H Sundström	6	6	6

Third round
5	(Sweden) M Wilander	6	4	6	6
(France) D Bedel	1	6	4	1
(Sweden) J Nyström	5	4	6	1
14	(Sweden) H Sundström	7	6	2	6

Fourth round
5	(Sweden) M Wilander	6	6	6
14	(Sweden) H Sundström	4	1	3

==== Section 8 ====
First round
10	(United States) E Teltscher	3	7	6	6
(South Africa) D Tarr	6	6	3	1
(United States) J Gurfein	6	6	6
(Italy) G Ocleppo	1	3	2
Q	(United States) P Groth	6	7	5	4	r
Q	(France) P Kuchna	7	6	7	2
Q	(South Africa) B Pirow	6	4	3	7	6
(France) G Moretton	4	6	6	5	2
(France) T Benhabiles	6	7	6
(India) R Krishnan	4	5	3
(United States) D Gitlin	5	6	6	6
(France) C Freyss	7	3	1	1
(Spain) A Tous	6	7	6
(Brazil) G Barbosa	2	5	3
(United States) B Testerman	6	1	2	7	2
2	(United States) J McEnroe	3	6	6	6	6

Second round
10	(United States) E Teltscher	6	7	6
(United States) J Gurfein	3	6	1
Q	(France) P Kuchna	2	6	4	6
Q	(South Africa) B Pirow	6	2	6	1
(France) T Benhabiles	3	6	2
(United States) D Gitlin	6	7	6
(Spain) A Tous	3	6	3
2	(United States) J McEnroe	6	7	6

Third round
10	(United States) E Teltscher	6	7	6
Q	(France) P Kuchna	3	6	3
(United States) D Gitlin	3	6	3	1
2	(United States) J McEnroe	6	3	6	6

Fourth round
10	(United States) E Teltscher	3	6	4	1
2	(United States) J McEnroe	6	3	6	6

Preceded by 1982 Wimbledon Championships	Grand Slam men's singles	Succeeded by 1983 Wimbledon Championships
