= 1982 Campionati Internazionali di Sicilia =

- Date: 13–19 September
- Edition: 4th
- Category: Grand Prix
- Draw: 32S / 16D
- Prize money: $100,000
- Surface: Clay / outdoor
- Location: Palermo, Italy

Champions

Singles
- (Bolivia) Mario Martínez

Doubles
- (Italy) Gianni Marchetti / (Italy) Enzo Vattuone
| ← 1981 · | Campionati Internazionali di Sicilia | · 1983 → |

The 1982 Campionati Internazionali di Sicilia, also known as the Sicilian Open, was a men's tennis tournament played on outdoor clay courts in Palermo, Italy that was part of the 1982 Volvo Grand Prix. It was the fourth edition of the tournament and took place from 13 September until 19 September 1982. Unseeded Mario Martínez won the singles title.

== Finals ==
=== Singles ===
(Bolivia) Mario Martínez defeated (Australia) John Alexander 6–4, 7–5

- It was Martínez' 1st singles title of the year and the 3rd of his career.

=== Doubles ===
(Italy) Gianni Marchetti / (Italy) Enzo Vattuone defeated (Uruguay) José Luis Damiani / (Uruguay) Diego Pérez 6–4, 6–7, 6–3
