= 1981 Campionati Internazionali di Sicilia =

- Date: 14–20 September
- Edition: 3rd
- Category: Grand Prix
- Draw: 32S / 16D
- Prize money: $75,000
- Surface: Clay / outdoor
- Location: Palermo, Italy

Champions

Singles
- (Spain) Manuel Orantes

Doubles
- (Uruguay) José Luis Damiani / (Uruguay) Diego Pérez
← 1980 ·	Campionati Internazionali di Sicilia	· 1982 →

The 1981 Campionati Internazionali di Sicilia, also known as the Sicilian Grand Prix, was a men's tennis tournament played on outdoor clay courts in Palermo, Italy that was part of the 1981 Volvo Grand Prix. It was the third edition of the tournament and took place from 14 September until 20 September 1981. Unseeded Manuel Orantes won the singles title.

== Finals ==
=== Singles ===
(Spain) Manuel Orantes defeated (Chile) Pedro Rebolledo 6–4, 6–0, 6–0

- It was Orantes' 1st singles title of the year and the 35th of his career.

=== Doubles ===
(Uruguay) José Luis Damiani / (Uruguay) Diego Pérez defeated (Chile) Jaime Fillol / (Chile) Belus Prajoux 6–1, 6–4
