= 1983 French Open – Men's doubles =

Men's doubles
- 1983 French Open

Final
- Champion: (Sweden) Anders Järryd (Sweden) Hans Simonsson
- Runner-up: (Australia) Mark Edmondson (United States) Sherwood Stewart
- Score: 7–6^{(7–4)}, 6–4, 6–2

Details
- Draw: 64
- Seeds: 16

Events
Singles	men	women		boys	girls
Doubles	men	women	mixed	boys	girls
WC Singles	men	women	quad
WC Doubles	men	women	quad
Legends	−45	45+	women
- French Open

The men's doubles tournament at the 1983 French Open was held from 23 May until 5 June 1983 on the outdoor clay courts at the Stade Roland Garros in Paris, France. Anders Järryd and Hans Simonsson won the title, defeating Mark Edmondson and Sherwood Stewart in the final.

== Seeds ==
1. (United States) Peter Fleming / (United States) Ferdi Taygan (first round)
2. (United States) Brian Gottfried / (Switzerland) Heinz Günthardt (quarterfinals)
3. (Australia) Mark Edmondson / (United States) Sherwood Stewart (final)
4. (Czechoslovakia) Pavel Složil / (Czechoslovakia) Tomáš Šmíd (semifinals)
5. (Brazil) Carlos Kirmayr / (Brazil) Cássio Motta (quarterfinals)
6. (Australia) John Alexander / (Australia) John Fitzgerald (first round)
7. (Chile) Hans Gildemeister / (Ecuador) Andrés Gómez (first round)
8. (Sweden) Anders Järryd / (Sweden) Hans Simonsson (champions)
9. (France) Henri Leconte / (France) Yannick Noah (first round)
10. (Australia) Broderick Dyke / (Chile) Belus Prajoux (semifinals)
11. (New Zealand) Chris Lewis / (Australia) Paul McNamee (third round)
12. (United States) Eric Fromm / (Israel) Shlomo Glickstein (quarterfinals)
13. (United States) Mark Dickson / (Sweden) Jan Gunnarsson (first round)
14. (United States) Charles Strode / (United States) Morris Strode (second round)
15. (Brazil) Givaldo Barbosa / (Brazil) João Soares (first round)
16. (United Kingdom) John Lloyd / (United States) Bruce Manson (first round)

== Draw ==
Key

- Q = Qualifier
- WC = Wild card
- LL = Lucky loser
- Alt = Alternate
- ITF = ITF entry
- PR = Protected ranking
- SR = Special ranking
- SE = Special exempt
- JE = Junior exempt
- JR = Junior Accelerator Programme entrant
- CO = College Accelerator Programme entrant
- NG = Next Gen Accelerator Program entrant
- w/o = Walkover
- r = Retired
- d = Defaulted

=== Finals ===
Quarterfinals
(Paraguay) Francisco González (Paraguay) Víctor Pecci	4	6	3
10	(Australia) Broderick Dyke (Chile) Belus Prajoux	6	1	6
3	(Australia) Mark Edmondson (United States) Sherwood Stewart	6	6
12	(United States) Eric Fromm (Israel) Shlomo Glickstein	4	1
5	(Brazil) Carlos Kirmayr (Brazil) Cássio Motta	2	7	0
4	(Czechoslovakia) Pavel Složil (Czechoslovakia) Tomáš Šmíd	6	5	6
8	(Sweden) Anders Järryd (Sweden) Hans Simonsson	6	6	6
2	(United States) Brian Gottfried (Switzerland) Heinz Günthardt	3	7	2

Semifinals
10	(Australia) Broderick Dyke (Chile) Belus Prajoux	4	5	3
3	(Australia) Mark Edmondson (United States) Sherwood Stewart	6	7	6
4	(Czechoslovakia) Pavel Složil (Czechoslovakia) Tomáš Šmíd	2	4	4
8	(Sweden) Anders Järryd (Sweden) Hans Simonsson	6	6	6

Final
3	(Australia) Mark Edmondson (United States) Sherwood Stewart	6	4	2
8	(Sweden) Anders Järryd (Sweden) Hans Simonsson	7	6	6

=== Top half ===
==== Section 1 ====
First round
1	(United States) P Fleming (United States) F Taygan	2	6	6
(Australia) D Graham (Australia) L Warder	6	2	7
(South Africa) E Edwards (South Africa) D Visser	6	6
(West Germany) A Maurer (West Germany) W Popp	2	1
(Paraguay) F González (Paraguay) V Pecci	6	6
(Zimbabwe) H Ismail (Netherlands) H van Boeckel	4	4
(Australia) W Hampson (Belgium) T Stevaux	2	4
14	(United States) C Strode (United States) M Strode	6	6
10	(Australia) B Dyke (Chile) B Prajoux	6	6
(Italy) C Panatta (Italy) G Rinaldini	4	2
(France) C Bernelle (France) J-M Piacentile	6	2	7
(France) B Fritz (France) J-L Haillet	3	6	5
(South Africa) B Mitton (South Africa) R Moore	6	6
(France) D Naegelen (France) J Potier	3	4
(Czechoslovakia) S Birner (Czechoslovakia) L Pimek	6	2	2
16	(Australia) J Alexander (Australia) J Fitzgerald	2	6	6

Second round
(Australia) D Graham (Australia) L Warder	6	1	6
(South Africa) E Edwards (South Africa) D Visser	3	6	2
(Paraguay) F González (Paraguay) V Pecci	7	6	3
14	(United States) C Strode (United States) M Strode	6	2
10	(Australia) B Dyke (Chile) B Prajoux	6	6	8
(France) C Bernelle (France) J-M Piacentile	7	3	6
(South Africa) B Mitton (South Africa) R Moore	6	1
16	(Australia) J Alexander (Australia) J Fitzgerald	7	6

Third round
(Australia) D Graham (Australia) L Warder	3	3
(Paraguay) F González (Paraguay) V Pecci	6	6
10	(Australia) B Dyke (Chile) B Prajoux	5	6	6
16	(Australia) J Alexander (Australia) J Fitzgerald	7	2	3

Quarterfinals
(Paraguay) F González (Paraguay) V Pecci	4	6	3
10	(Australia) B Dyke (Chile) B Prajoux	6	1	6

==== Section 2 ====
First round
3	(Australia) M Edmondson (United States) S Stewart	6	6
(South Africa) F Sauer (South Africa) M van der Merwe	4	1
(Canada) J Brabenec (United States) M de Palmer	6	6
(France) T Allan (France) C Freyss	2	4
(Sweden) S Simonsson (Sweden) H Sundström	7	6
(France) D Bedel (France) G Moretton	5	1
(Italy) G Marchetti (Italy) E Vattuone	0	7	7
15	(Brazil) G Barbosa (Brazil) J Soares	6	5	5
12	(United States) E Fromm (Israel) S Glickstein	6	6
(United States) P DuPré (Poland) W Fibak	3	2
(United States) M Estep (New Zealand) J Simpson	6	6	9
(South Africa) B Levine (South Africa) M Myburg	4	7	7
(Colombia) A Cortes (Argentina) A Gattiker	3	4
(Argentina) JL Clerc (Romania) I Năstase	6	6
(United States) M Leach (Romania) F Segărceanu	7	6
7	(Chile) H Gildemeister (Ecuador) A Gómez	5	2

Second round
3	(Australia) M Edmondson (United States) S Stewart	6	6
(Canada) J Brabenec (United States) M de Palmer	4	2
(Sweden) S Simonsson (Sweden) H Sundström	7	6
(Italy) G Marchetti (Italy) E Vattuone	6	2
12	(United States) E Fromm (Israel) S Glickstein	6	7
(United States) M Estep (New Zealand) J Simpson	4	6
(Argentina) JL Clerc (Romania) I Năstase	6	7
5	(United States) M Leach (Romania) F Segărceanu	3	5

Third round
3	(Australia) M Edmondson (United States) S Stewart	w/o
(Sweden) S Simonsson (Sweden) H Sundström
12	(United States) E Fromm (Israel) S Glickstein	6	4	6
(Argentina) JL Clerc (Romania) I Năstase	3	6	4

Quarterfinals
3	(Australia) M Edmondson (United States) S Stewart	6	6
12	(United States) E Fromm (Israel) S Glickstein	4	1

=== Bottom half ===
==== Section 3 ====
First round
5	(Brazil) C Kirmayr (Brazil) C Motta	4	6	7
(Australia) P Cash (Australia) C Miller	6	4	5
(Belgium) B Boileau (Mexico) A González	4	6	6
(France) T Benhabiles (France) L Courteau	6	3	4
(Sweden) J Nyström (Sweden) M Tideman	7	6
(United States) T Graham (United States) M Mitchell	6	2
(Uruguay) JL Damiani (Ecuador) R Ycaza	6	6	6
9	(France) H Leconte (France) Y Noah	7	2	3
16	(United Kingdom) J Lloyd (United States) B Manson	6	2
(Spain) S Casal (Brazil) A Hocevar	7	6
(Socialist Federal Republic of Yugoslavia) M Ostoja (Sweden) S Svensson	6	6
(Uruguay) D Pérez (Uruguay) H Roverano	4	1
(Australia) P Johnston (Australia) J McCurdy	7	3	5
(United States) M Purcell (United States) E Teltscher	6	6	7
(Chile) R Acuña (Chile) I Camus	2	3
4	(Czechoslovakia) P Složil (Czechoslovakia) T Šmíd	6	6

Second round
5	(Brazil) C Kirmayr (Brazil) C Motta	6	7
(Belgium) B Boileau (Mexico) A González	4	6
(Sweden) J Nyström (Sweden) M Tideman	4	6	4
(Uruguay) JL Damiani (Ecuador) R Ycaza	6	1	6
(Spain) S Casal (Brazil) A Hocevar	3	6	7
(Uruguay) D Pérez (Uruguay) H Roverano	6	2	5
(United States) M Purcell (United States) E Teltscher	2	1
4	(Czechoslovakia) P Složil (Czechoslovakia) T Šmíd	6	6

Third round
5	(Brazil) C Kirmayr (Brazil) C Motta	6	7
(Uruguay) JL Damiani (Ecuador) R Ycaza	4	6
(Spain) S Casal (Brazil) A Hocevar	4	0
4	(Czechoslovakia) P Složil (Czechoslovakia) T Šmíd	6	6

Quarterfinals
5	(Brazil) C Kirmayr (Brazil) C Motta	2	7	0
4	(Czechoslovakia) P Složil (Czechoslovakia) T Šmíd	6	5	6

==== Section 4 ====
First round
8	(Sweden) A Järryd (Sweden) H Simonsson	6	6
(United Kingdom) J Feaver (United Kingdom) R Lewis	3	2
(South Africa) D Tarr (South Africa) R Venter	6	3	6
(Switzerland) M Günthardt (Philippines) B Sison	2	6	3
(West Germany) D Keretić (Spain) A Tous	1^{r}
(Chile) J Fillol (Chile) P Rebolledo	2
(Peru) P Arraya (United States) C Hooper	4	3
13	(United States) M Dickson (Sweden) J Gunnarsson	6	6
11	(New Zealand) C Lewis (Australia) P McNamee	3	7	6
(United States) D Gitlin (United States) J Gurfein	6	6	2
(New Zealand) B Derlin (United States) S Krulevitz	6	4	3
(United States) R Crowley (United States) R Evett	1	6	6
(Brazil) J Góes (Brazil) N Keller	4	4
(Italy) G Ocleppo (France) C Roger-Vasselin	6	6
(United States) B Testerman (United States) T Waltke	5	2
2	(United States) B Gottfried (Switzerland) H Günthardt	7	6

Second round
8	(Sweden) A Järryd (Sweden) H Simonsson	6	7
(South Africa) D Tarr (South Africa) R Venter	2	6
(Chile) J Fillol (Chile) P Rebolledo	4	6	6
13	(United States) M Dickson (Sweden) J Gunnarsson	6	4	2
11	(New Zealand) C Lewis (Australia) P McNamee	6	7
(United States) R Crowley (United States) R Evett	3	6
(Italy) G Ocleppo (France) C Roger-Vasselin	2	6	2
2	(United States) B Gottfried (Switzerland) H Günthardt	6	3	6

Third round
8	(Sweden) A Järryd (Sweden) H Simonsson	6	6
(Chile) J Fillol (Chile) P Rebolledo	2	3
11	(New Zealand) C Lewis (Australia) P McNamee	4	6	4
2	(United States) B Gottfried (Switzerland) H Günthardt	6	4	6

Quarterfinals
8	(Sweden) A Järryd (Sweden) H Simonsson	6	6	6
2	(United States) B Gottfried (Switzerland) H Günthardt	3	7	2
