= 1981 Bordeaux Open – Doubles =

Doubles
- 1981 Bordeaux Open

Final
- Champions: (Ecuador) Andrés Gómez (Chile) Belus Prajoux
- Runners-up: (United States) Jim Gurfein (Sweden) Anders Järryd
- Score: 7–5, 6–3

Events
Singles	Doubles
← 1980 ·	ATP Bordeaux	· 1982 →

John Feaver and Gilles Moretton were the defending champions, but Moretton did not compete this year. Feaver teamed up with Billy Martin and lost in the first round to Jean-Louis Haillet and Yannick Noah.

Andrés Gómez and Belus Prajoux won the title by defeating Jim Gurfein and Anders Järryd 7–5, 6–3 in the final.

== Seeds ==
1. (Ecuador) Andrés Gómez / (Chile) Belus Prajoux (champions)
2. (United Kingdom) John Feaver / (United States) Billy Martin (first round)
3. (United States) Jim Gurfein / (Sweden) Anders Järryd (final)
4. (Argentina) Guillermo Aubone / (Chile) Alejandro Pierola (semifinals)

== Draw ==
=== Key ===
- Q = Qualifier
- WC = Wild card
- LL = Lucky loser
- Alt = Alternate
- SE = Special exempt
- PR = Protected ranking
- ITF = ITF entry
- JE = Junior exempt
- w/o = Walkover
- r = Retired
- d = Defaulted
- SR = Special ranking

=== Draw ===
First round
1	(Ecuador) A Gómez (Chile) B Prajoux	7	6
(France) D Bedel (France) C Freyss	5	4
(United States) E Iskersky (United States) J Lapidus	6	6
(France) P Aucouturier (United States) I Schindler	2	4
(France) X Lemoine (France) P Portes	2	5
4	(Argentina) G Aubone (Chile) A Pierola	6	7
(Finland) L Palin (United States) J Van Nostrand	6	7
(France) B Jamin (France) P Kuchna	4	6
(France) L Courteau (France) F Lacueille	3	6	6
(France) J-M Bousquet (France) B La Font	6	1	2
3	(United States) J Gurfein (Sweden) A Järryd	6	6
(Argentina) C Castellan (Argentina) G Tiberti	1	4
(Argentina) E Ruiz-Bry (Argentina) J Todero	7	6
(France) J Potier (France) P Torre	5	1
(France) J-L Haillet (France) Y Noah	6	6
2	(United Kingdom) J Feaver (United States) B Martin	4	3

Quarterfinals
1	(Ecuador) A Gómez (Chile) B Prajoux	6	7
(United States) E Iskersky (United States) J Lapidus	4	5
4	(Argentina) G Aubone (Chile) A Pierola	4	6	6
(Finland) L Palin (United States) J Van Nostrand	6	3	2
(France) L Courteau (France) F Lacueille	1	0
3	(United States) J Gurfein (Sweden) A Järryd	6	6
(Argentina) E Ruiz-Bry (Argentina) J Todero	4	2
(France) J-L Haillet (France) Y Noah	6	6

Semifinals
1	(Ecuador) A Gómez (Chile) B Prajoux	6	6
4	(Argentina) G Aubone (Chile) A Pierola	1	1
3	(United States) J Gurfein (Sweden) A Järryd	7	3	6
(France) J-L Haillet (France) Y Noah	6	6	3

Final
1	(Ecuador) A Gómez (Chile) B Prajoux	7	6
3	(United States) J Gurfein (Sweden) A Järryd	5	3
