= 1980 Bordeaux Open – Doubles =

Doubles
- 1980 Bordeaux Open

Final
- Champions: (United Kingdom) John Feaver (France) Gilles Moretton
- Runners-up: (Italy) Gianni Ocleppo (Ecuador) Ricardo Ycaza
- Score: 6–3, 6–2

Details
- Draw: 16
- Seeds: 4

Events
Singles	Doubles
- ATP Bordeaux

Patrice Dominguez and Denis Naegelen were the defending champions, but none competed this year.

John Feaver and Gilles Moretton won the title by defeating Gianni Ocleppo and Ricardo Ycaza 6–3, 6–2 in the final.

== Seeds ==
1. (Chile) Hans Gildemeister / (Ecuador) Andrés Gómez (quarterfinals)
2. (United States) Tony Giammalva / (New Zealand) Chris Lewis (semifinals)
3. (Italy) Gianni Ocleppo / (Ecuador) Ricardo Ycaza (final)
4. (United Kingdom) John Feaver / (France) Gilles Moretton (champions)

== Draw ==
Key

- Q = Qualifier
- WC = Wild card
- LL = Lucky loser
- Alt = Alternate
- ITF = ITF entry
- PR = Protected ranking
- SR = Special ranking
- SE = Special exempt
- JE = Junior exempt
- JR = Junior Accelerator Programme entrant
- CO = College Accelerator Programme entrant
- NG = Next Gen Accelerator Program entrant
- w/o = Walkover
- r = Retired
- d = Defaulted

=== Draw ===
First round
1	(Chile) H Gildemeister (Ecuador) A Gómez	7	7
(France) JL Haillet (France) P Portes	6	6
(Sweden) P Hjertquist (Sweden) S Simonsson	6	6
(United States) John Mirlisena (United States) David Wolf	3	4
4	(United Kingdom) J Feaver (France) G Moretton	7	6
(Sweden) J Gunnarsson (Sweden) M Wilander	5	3
(Bolivia) M Martínez (Argentina) E Ruiz-Bry	2	6	6
(France) Olivier Courteau (France) François Lacueille	6	1	0
(France) Bernard Jamin (France) Pierre Lemoine	6	6	6
(France) Jean-Marc Bousquet (France) Kowa-kiu Lee	3	7	4
(France) C Freyss (France) B Fritz	6	4
3	(Italy) G Ocleppo (Ecuador) R Ycaza	7	6
(France) H Leconte (France) J Potier	2	6	6
(France) L Courteau (France) C Lesage	6	1	4
(Canada) H Fritz (Argentina) Lorenzo Soriano	4	2
2	(United States) T Giammalva (New Zealand) C Lewis	6	6

Quarterfinals
1	(Chile) H Gildemeister (Ecuador) A Gómez	6	6
(Sweden) P Hjertquist (Sweden) S Simonsson	7	7
4	(United Kingdom) J Feaver (France) G Moretton	6	5	6
(Bolivia) M Martínez (Argentina) E Ruiz-Bry	3	7	4
(France) B Jamin (France) P Lemoine	0	0
3	(Italy) G Ocleppo (Ecuador) R Ycaza	6	6
(France) H Leconte (France) J Potier	1	2
2	(United States) T Giammalva (New Zealand) C Lewis	6	6

Semifinals
(Sweden) P Hjertquist (Sweden) S Simonsson	6	6
4	(United Kingdom) J Feaver (France) G Moretton	7	7
3	(Italy) G Ocleppo (Ecuador) R Ycaza	7	7
2	(United States) T Giammalva (New Zealand) C Lewis	6	6

Final
4	(United Kingdom) J Feaver (France) G Moretton	6	6
3	(Italy) G Ocleppo (Ecuador) R Ycaza	3	2
