= 1980 Bordeaux Open – Singles =

Singles
- 1980 Bordeaux Open

Final
- Champion: (Bolivia) Mario Martínez
- Runner-up: (Italy) Gianni Ocleppo
- Score: 6–0, 7–5, 7–5

Details
- Draw: 32 (4Q/1LL)
- Seeds: 8

Events
Singles	Doubles
- ATP Bordeaux

Yannick Noah was the defending champion, but did not compete this year.

Mario Martínez won the title by defeating Gianni Ocleppo 6–0, 7–5, 7–5 in the final.

== Seeds ==
1. (Italy) Corrado Barazzutti (semifinals)
2. (Chile) Hans Gildemeister (quarterfinals)
3. (Bolivia) Mario Martínez (champion)
4. (Italy) Gianni Ocleppo (final)
5. (n/a)
6. (New Zealand) Chris Lewis (quarterfinals)
7. (Ecuador) Andrés Gómez (second round)
8. (United States) Tony Giammalva (quarterfinals, retired)

== Draw ==
Key

- Q = Qualifier
- WC = Wild card
- LL = Lucky loser
- Alt = Alternate
- ITF = ITF entry
- PR = Protected ranking
- SR = Special ranking
- SE = Special exempt
- JE = Junior exempt
- JR = Junior Accelerator Programme entrant
- CO = College Accelerator Programme entrant
- NG = Next Gen Accelerator Program entrant
- w/o = Walkover
- r = Retired
- d = Defaulted

=== Finals ===
Semifinals
1	(Italy) Corrado Barazzutti	3	6	5
4	(Italy) Gianni Ocleppo	6	2	7
3	(Bolivia) Mario Martínez	6	4	6
LL	(Ecuador) Ricardo Ycaza	2	6	3

Final
4	(Italy) Gianni Ocleppo	0	5	5
3	(Bolivia) Mario Martínez	6	7	7

=== Top half ===
First round
1	(Italy) C Barazzutti	6	3	6
Q	(France) H Leconte	1	6	2
(France) P Dominguez	6	6
Q	(Sweden) J Gunnarsson	3	2
(Netherlands) L Sanders	6	4	9
(West Germany) J Feaver	3	6	7
(France) P Torre	6	2	4
6	(New Zealand) C Lewis	3	6	6
4	(Italy) G Ocleppo	6	3	6
(Sweden) P Hjertquist	4	6	0
(Sweden) S Simonsson	6	6
(France) B Fritz	3	1
(France) P Portes	6	7
(Argentina) Lorenzo Soriano	3	6
(United States) H Fritz	0	2
8	(United States) T Giammalva	6	6

Second round
1	(Italy) C Barazzutti	6	6
(France) P Dominguez	4	1
(Netherlands) L Sanders	1	1
6	(New Zealand) C Lewis	6	6
4	(Italy) G Ocleppo	6	6
(Sweden) S Simonsson	4	4
(France) P Portes	5	6	3
8	(United States) T Giammalva	7	3	6

Quarterfinals
1	(Italy) C Barazzutti	6	7
6	(New Zealand) C Lewis	3	6
4	(Italy) G Ocleppo	1
8	(United States) T Giammalva	0^{r}

Semifinals
1	(Italy) C Barazzutti	3	6	5
4	(Italy) G Ocleppo	6	2	7

=== Bottom half ===
First round
7	(Ecuador) A Gómez	6	6
Q	(France) P Kuchna	3	1
(France) J Potier	6	6
(France) JL Haillet	3	2
(France) G Moretton	7	2	6
(France) C Freyss	6	6	2
(South Africa) J Yuill	7	4	4
3	(Bolivia) M Martínez	5	6	6
LL	(Ecuador) R Ycaza	2	6	6
(Argentina) E Ruiz-Bry	6	2	1
(Spain) G Urpí	6	6
(France) G Goven	3	1
(Sweden) H Simonsson	6	7
(France) T Tulasne	3	5
Q	(Sweden) M Wilander	6	1	4
2	(Chile) H Gildemeister	2	6	6

Second round
7	(Ecuador) A Gómez	4	6
(France) J Potier	6	7
(France) G Moretton	1	3
3	(Bolivia) M Martínez	6	6
LL	(Ecuador) R Ycaza	6	6
(Spain) G Urpí	3	2
(Sweden) H Simonsson	4	2
2	(Chile) H Gildemeister	6	6

Quarterfinals
(France) J Potier	3	2
3	(Bolivia) M Martínez	6	6
LL	(Ecuador) R Ycaza	6	3	6
2	(Chile) H Gildemeister	3	6	2

Semifinals
3	(Bolivia) M Martínez	6	4	6
LL	(Ecuador) R Ycaza	2	6	3
