= 1981 Bordeaux Open – Singles =

Singles
- 1981 Bordeaux Open

Final
- Champion: (Ecuador) Andrés Gómez
- Runner-up: (France) Thierry Tulasne
- Score: 7–6, 7–6, 6–1

Details
- Draw: 32
- Seeds: 8

Events
| Singles | Doubles |
- ATP Bordeaux

Mario Martínez was the defending champion, but chose to compete at Geneva in the same week.

Andrés Gómez won the title by defeating Thierry Tulasne 7–6, 7–6, 6–1 in the final.

== Seeds ==
1. (France) Yannick Noah (quarterfinals)
2. (Ecuador) Andrés Gómez (champion)
3. (France) Thierry Tulasne (final)
4. (Spain) Fernando Luna (semifinals)
5. (Spain) Ángel Giménez (first round)
6. (Sweden) Anders Järryd (second round)
7. (France) Pascal Portes (semifinals)
8. (Spain) Gabriel Urpí (quarterfinals)

== Draw ==
Key

- Q = Qualifier
- WC = Wild card
- LL = Lucky loser
- Alt = Alternate
- ITF = ITF entry
- PR = Protected ranking
- SR = Special ranking
- SE = Special exempt
- JE = Junior exempt
- JR = Junior Accelerator Programme entrant
- CO = College Accelerator Programme entrant
- NG = Next Gen Accelerator Program entrant
- w/o = Walkover
- r = Retired
- d = Defaulted

=== Finals ===
Semifinals
7 | (France) Pascal Portes | 4 | 2
3 | (France) Thierry Tulasne | 6 | 6
4 | (Spain) Fernando Luna | 5 | 2
2 | (Ecuador) Andrés Gómez | 7 | 6

Final
3 | (France) Thierry Tulasne | 6 | 6 | 1
2 | (Ecuador) Andrés Gómez | 7 | 7 | 6

=== Top half ===
First round
1 | (France) Y Noah | 6 | 6
(Sweden) H Sundström | 2 | 1
(Argentina) C Castellan | 6 | 6
(France) P Proisy | 4 | 4
(France) C Casa | 3 | 4
(France) C Freyss | 6 | 6
(Argentina) G Aubone | 6 | 4
7 | (France) P Portes | 7 | 6
3 | (France) T Tulasne | 6 | 6
(France) J Potier | 2 | 2
(United States) J Lapidus | 6 | 3 | 0
(Chile) A Pierola | 4 | 6 | 6
(France) P Torre | 6 | 6
(France) P Kuchna | 3 | 3
(United States) J Gurfein | 6 | 4 | 6
5 | (Spain) A Gimenez | 0 | 6 | 3

Second round
1 | (France) Y Noah | 6 | 6
(Argentina) C Castellan | 0 | 2
(France) C Freyss | 3 | 2
7 | (France) P Portes | 6 | 6
3 | (France) T Tulasne | 6 | 6 | 6
(Chile) A Pierola | 2 | 7 | 3
(France) P Torre | 3 | 6 | 5
(United States) J Gurfein | 6 | 2 | 7

Quarterfinals
1 | (France) Y Noah | 4 | 6 | 4
7 | (France) P Portes | 6 | 1 | 6
3 | (France) T Tulasne | 6 | 6
(United States) J Gurfein | 4 | 4

Semifinals
7 | (France) P Portes | 4 | 2
3 | (France) T Tulasne | 6 | 6

=== Bottom half ===
First round
8 | (Spain) G Urpí | 7 | 6
(France) H Leconte | 5 | 2
(Chile) B Prajoux | 3 | 2
(United States) B Martin | 6 | 6
(France) J-F Caujolle | 6 | 6
(Argentina) G Tiberti | 2 | 0
(France) D Bedel | 6 | 3 | 3
4 | (Spain) F Luna | 3 | 6 | 6
6 | (Sweden) A Järryd | 6 | 6
(Spain) R Vizcaíno | 1 | 2
(United States) E Iskersky | 7 | 6
(France) L Courteau | 5 | 3
(Sweden) J Gunnarsson | 4 | 7 | 6
(France) J-L Haillet | 6 | 6 | 2
(Socialist Federal Republic of Yugoslavia) M Ostoja | 6 | 4 | 2
2 | (Ecuador) A Gómez | 3 | 6 | 6

Second round
8 | (Spain) G Urpí | 6 | 6
(United States) B Martin | 3 | 3
(France) J-F Caujolle | 3 | 4
4 | (Spain) F Luna | 6 | 6
6 | (Sweden) A Järryd | 3 | 3
(United States) E Iskersky | 6 | 6
(Sweden) J Gunnarsson | 1 | 6
2 | (Ecuador) A Gómez | 6 | 7

Quarterfinals
8 | (Spain) G Urpí | 4 | 6 | 0
4 | (Spain) F Luna | 6 | 4 | 6
(United States) E Iskersky | 2 | 4
2 | (Ecuador) A Gómez | 6 | 6

Semifinals
4 | (Spain) F Luna | 5 | 2
2 | (Ecuador) A Gómez | 7 | 6
