= Paul Groth =

Paul Groth may refer to:

- Paul Heinrich von Groth (1843–1927), German mineralogist
- Paul Groth (tennis), American attorney and tennis player
