= 1980 Bordeaux Open =

- Date: 22–27 September
- Edition: 2nd
- Category: Grand Prix
- Draw: 32S / 16D
- Prize money: $50,000
- Surface: Clay / outdoor
- Location: Bordeaux, France
- Venue: Villa Primrose

Champions

Singles
- (Bolivia) Mario Martínez

Doubles
- (United Kingdom) John Feaver / (France) Gilles Moretton
- Bordeaux Open

The 1980 Bordeaux Open also known as the Grand Prix Passing Shot was a men's tennis tournament played on clay courts at Villa Primrose in Bordeaux, France that was part of the 1980 Volvo Grand Prix. It was the second edition of the tournament and was held from 22 September until 27 September 1980. Third-seeded Mario Martínez won the singles title.

== Finals ==
=== Singles ===
(Bolivia) Mario Martínez defeated (Italy) Gianni Ocleppo 6–0, 7–5, 7–5

- It was Martínez' first singles title of his career.

=== Doubles ===
(United Kingdom) John Feaver / (France) Gilles Moretton defeated (Italy) Gianni Ocleppo / (Ecuador) Ricardo Ycaza 6–3, 6–2
