= 1980 Campionati Internazionali di Sicilia =

- Date: 8–14 September
- Edition: 2nd
- Category: Grand Prix
- Draw: 32S / 16D
- Prize money: $75,000
- Surface: Clay / outdoor
- Location: Palermo, Italy

Champions

Singles
- (Argentina) Guillermo Vilas

Doubles
- (Ecuador) Ricardo Ycaza / (Italy) Gianni Ocleppo
- Campionati Internazionali di Sicilia

The 1980 Campionati Internazionali di Sicilia, also known as the Palermo Grand Prix or the Sicilian Open, was a men's tennis tournament played on outdoor clay courts in Palermo, Italy that was part of the 1980 Volvo Grand Prix. It was the second edition of the tournament and took place from 8 September until 14 September 1980. First-seeded Guillermo Vilas won the singles title.

== Finals ==
=== Singles ===
(Argentina) Guillermo Vilas defeated (Australia) Paul McNamee 6–4, 6–0, 6–0

- It was Vilas' 3rd singles title of the year and the 49th of his career.

=== Doubles ===
(Ecuador) Ricardo Ycaza / (Italy) Gianni Ocleppo defeated (Paraguay) Víctor Pecci / (Hungary) Balázs Taróczy 6–2, 6–2
