= 1981 Torneo Godó =

- Date: 5–11 October
- Edition: 29th
- Category: Grand Prix circuit
- Draw: 64S / 32D
- Prize money: $175,000
- Surface: Clay / outdoor
- Location: Barcelona, Catalonia, Spain
- Venue: Real Club de Tenis Barcelona

Champions

Singles
- (Czechoslovakia) Ivan Lendl

Doubles
- (Sweden) Anders Jarryd / (Sweden) Hans Simonsson
- Torneo Godó

The 1981 Torneo Godó or Trofeo Conde de Godó was a tennis tournament that took place on outdoor clay courts at the Real Club de Tenis Barcelona in Barcelona, Catalonia in Spain. It was the 29th edition of the tournament and was part of the 1981 Grand Prix circuit. It was held from October 5 through October 11, 1981. First-seeded Ivan Lendl won his second consecutive singles title at the event.

This event also carried the joint denominations of the Campeonatos Internacionales de España or Spanish International Championships that was hosted at this venue and location, and was 14th edition to be held in Barcelona, and the 4th edition of the Open Marlborough (for sponsorship reasons).

== Finals ==
=== Singles ===
(Czechoslovakia) Ivan Lendl defeated (Argentina) Guillermo Vilas 6–0, 6–3, 6–0

- It was Lendl's 5th singles title of the year and the 12th of his career.

=== Doubles ===
(Sweden) Anders Jarryd / (Sweden) Hans Simonsson defeated (Chile) Hans Gildemeister / (Ecuador) Andres Gomez 6–1, 6–4
