= Christophe Bernelle =

French tennis player

- Country (sports): France
- Born: 31 December 1962 (age 63) Paris, France
- Height: 6 ft 1 in (185 cm)

Singles
- Career record: 1–6
- Highest ranking: No. 185 (3 Jan 1983)

Grand Slam singles results
- French Open: 2R (1983)

Doubles
- Career record: 1–5
- Highest ranking: No. 237 (2 Jan 1984)

Grand Slam doubles results
- French Open: 2R (1983)

Christophe Bernelle (born 31 December 1962) is a French former professional tennis player.

A native of Paris, Bernelle was active on the professional tennis tour in the 1980s, with a best singles world ranking of 185 and national ranking of 13. His most notable performance came at the 1983 French Open, where he won a five-set first round match over Simon Youl, then lost in the second round to defending champion Mats Wilander.

Bernelle is now employed by the French Tennis Federation as their head psychiatrist.
