= 1981 Bordeaux Open =

- Date: 21–26 September
- Edition: 3rd
- Category: Grand Prix
- Draw: 32S / 16D
- Prize money: $75,000
- Surface: Clay / outdoor
- Location: Bordeaux, France
- Venue: Villa Primrose

Champions

Singles
- (Ecuador) Andrés Gómez

Doubles
- (Ecuador) Andrés Gómez / (Chile) Belus Prajoux
- Bordeaux Open

The 1981 Bordeaux Open also known as the "Grand Prix Passing Shot" was a tennis tournament played on outdoor clay courts at Villa Primrose in Bordeaux in France that was part of the 1981 Volvo Grand Prix. The tournament was held from 21 September through 26 September 1981. Second-seeded Andrés Gómez won the singles title.

== Finals ==
=== Singles ===
(Ecuador) Andrés Gómez defeated (France) Thierry Tulasne 7–6, 7–6, 6–1

- It was Gómez' first singles title of his career.

=== Doubles ===
(Ecuador) Andrés Gómez / (Chile) Belus Prajoux defeated (United States) Jim Gurfein / (Sweden) Anders Järryd 7–5, 6–3
