= 1983 Campionati Internazionali di Sicilia =

- Date: 12–18 September
- Edition: 5th
- Category: Grand Prix
- Draw: 32S / 16D
- Prize money: $100,000
- Surface: Clay / outdoor
- Location: Palermo, Italy

Champions

Singles
- (United States) Jimmy Arias

Doubles
- (Peru) Pablo Arraya / (Argentina) José Luis Clerc
- Campionati Internazionali di Sicilia

The 1983 Campionati Internazionali di Sicilia, also known as the Sicilian Open, was a men's tennis tournament played on outdoor clay courts in Palermo, Italy that was part of the 1983 Volvo Grand Prix. It was the fifth edition of the tournament and took place from 12 September until 18 September 1983. Second-seeded Jimmy Arias won the singles title.

== Finals ==
=== Singles ===
(United States) Jimmy Arias defeated (Argentina) José Luis Clerc 3–6, 6–1, 6–3

- It was Arias' 4th singles title of the year and the 5th and last of his career.

=== Doubles ===
(Peru) Pablo Arraya / (Argentina) José Luis Clerc defeated (South Africa) Danie Visser / (South Africa) Tian Viljoen 1–6, 6–4, 6–4
