= Juan Torralbo =

Spanish tennis player

- Full name: Juan Torralbo-Olmo
- Country (sports): Spain

Singles
- Career record: 2–4
- Highest ranking: No. 264 (12 Dec 1976)

Doubles
- Career record: 0–5

Juan Torralbo-Olmo is a Spanish former professional tennis player.

Torralbo, the 1977 King's Cup champion, made the second round twice at the Torneo Godó, including in 1980 when he was beaten by Ivan Lendl. He had a career high singles ranking of 264 in the world.
