= Enzo Vattuone =

Italian tennis player

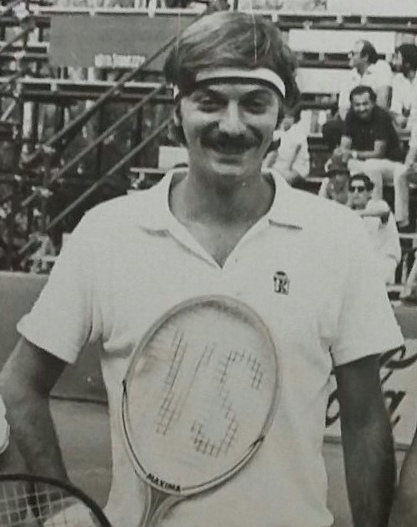
- Country (sports): Italy
- Born: 18 April 1956 (age 69) Genoa, Italy
- Plays: Right-handed

Singles
- Career record: 0–5
- Career titles: 0
- Highest ranking: No. 246 (1 November 1980)

Grand Slam singles results
- Australian Open: 1R (1976)
- French Open: Q2 (1975)
- Wimbledon: –
- US Open: –

Doubles
- Career record: 20–38
- Career titles: 1
- Highest ranking: No. 82 (3 January 1983)

Grand Slam doubles results
- Australian Open: –
- French Open: 2R (1983)
- Wimbledon: 1R (1983)
- US Open: –
Medal record
Mediterranean Games
Gold medal – first place	1975 Algiers	Doubles

Vincenzo "Enzo" Vattuone (born 18 April 1956) is an Italian retired professional tennis player who won a gold medal at the 1975 Mediterranean Games.

== Career finals ==
=== Doubles (1 title) ===
Legend (singles)
Grand Slam (0)
Tennis Masters Cup (0)
ATP Masters Series (0)
ATP Tour (1)

Result	W/L	Date	Tournament	Surface	Partner	Opponents	Score
Win	1–0	Sep 1982	Palermo, Italy	Clay	(Italy) Gianni Marchetti	(Uruguay) José Luis Damiani (Uruguay) Diego Pérez	6–4, 6–7, 6–3
