= Paul Groth (tennis) =

American tennis player

- Country (sports): United States

Singles
- Career record: 0–1
- Highest ranking: No. 369 (Jan 3, 1983)

Grand Slam singles results
- French Open: 1R (1983)

Doubles
- Highest ranking: No. 281 (Jan 3, 1983)

Paul L. Groth is an American attorney and former professional tennis player. He is a Founding Partner of Groth, Makarenko, Kaiser and Eidex, a law firm in Suwanee, Georgia.

Groth, raised in Atlanta, attended the University of Georgia on a tennis scholarship. He earned All-SEC selection in 1981 and was a doubles participant in the NCAA championships with Brent Crymes.

Competing on the professional tour in the 1980s, Groth was a main draw qualifier at the 1983 French Open, where he had to retire hurt in the fourth set of his first round match against Patrice Kuchna.
