= ATP Venice =

International Tennis Championships of Venice

Defunct tennis tournament
- Event name: Venice Open
- Tour: Grand Prix circuit
- Founded: 1981
- Abolished: 1983
- Editions: 3
- Location: Venice, Italy
- Surface: Clay

The ATP Venice is a defunct, Grand Prix tennis circuit affiliated men's tennis tournament. It was held from 1981 until 1983 in Venice, Italy and was played on outdoor clay courts. During its last year, the tournament was titled the International Tennis Championships of Venice.

== Finals ==
=== Singles ===
Year	Champions	Runners-up	Score	Source
1981	(Bolivia) Mario Martinez	(Italy) Paolo Bertolucci	6–4, 6–4	
1982	(Argentina) José Luis Clerc	(Australia) Peter McNamara	7–6, 6–1	
1983	(Argentina) Roberto Argüello	(United States) Jimmy Brown	2–6, 6–2, 6–0	

=== Doubles ===
Year	Champions	Runners-up	Score	Source
1981	Not held			
1982	(Brazil) Carlos Kirmayr (Brazil) Cássio Motta	(Argentina) José Luis Clerc (Romania) Ilie Năstase	6–4, 6–2	
1983	(Paraguay) Francisco González (Paraguay) Víctor Pecci	(Israel) Steve Krulevitz (Hungary) Zoltan Kuharszky	6–1, 6–2	
