= Ernesto Ruiz-Bry =

Argentine tennis player and coach

- Country (sports): Argentina
- Born: 1953 (age 71–72)

Singles
- Career record: 0–1
- Highest ranking: No. 594 (4 Jan 1981)

Doubles
- Career record: 5–11
- Highest ranking: No. 272 (4 Jan 1981)

Grand Slam doubles results
- French Open: 1R (1981)

Ernesto Ruiz-Bry (born 1953) is an Argentine former professional tennis player and coach.

A native of Mar del Plata, Ruiz-Bry featured in the men's doubles main draw of the 1981 French Open with his regular doubles partner Mario Martínez. He was also the tour coach of Martínez and guided the Bolivian to a world ranking in the 30s. During the early 1980s he joined the Ion Țiriac-led coaching team of Guillermo Vilas. In 1991 he became the coach of top-five player Mary Joe Fernández on the recommendation of Țiriac.
