= Gianni Marchetti (tennis) =

Italian tennis player

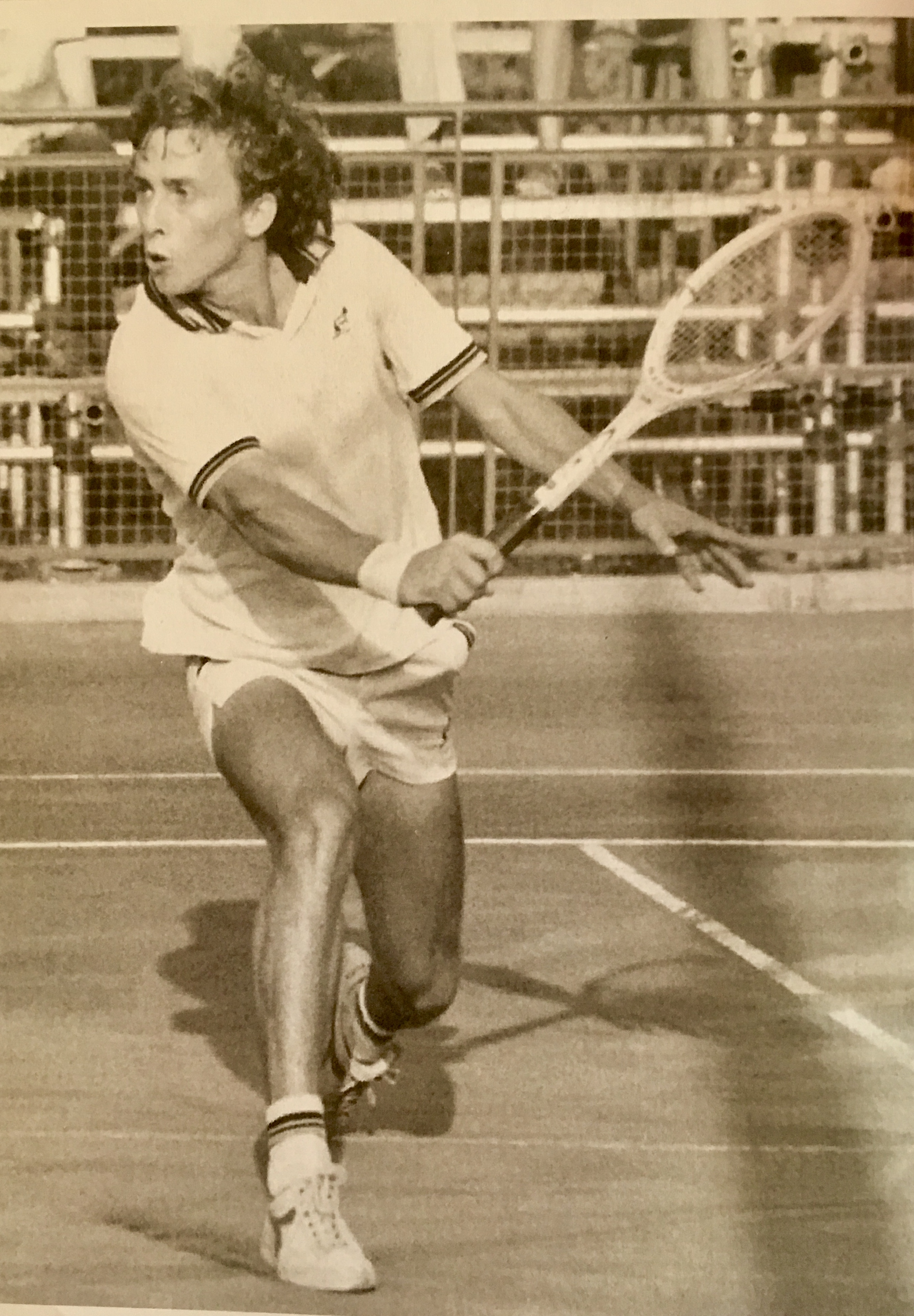
- Country (sports): Italy
- Born: 8 July 1956 (age 68); Jolanda di Savoia, Italy
- Plays: Right-handed

Singles
- Career record: 1–6
- Highest ranking: No. 255 (22 December 1980)

Grand Slam singles results
- Australian Open: 1R (1976)

Doubles
- Career record: 17–30
- Career titles: 1
- Highest ranking: No. 97 (3 January 1983)

Grand Slam doubles results
- French Open: 2R (1983)
- Wimbledon: 1R (1983)

Gianni Marchetti (born 8 July 1956) is an Italian former professional tennis player.

Born in Jolanda di Savoia, Marchetti featured in the main draw of the 1976 Australian Open, where he lost his first round match in five sets to Teimuraz Kakulia. His other grand slam appearances came as a doubles player, at the French Open and Wimbledon. It was in doubles that he had the most success, winning a title at Palermo in 1982 with Enzo Vattuone, then reaching his best ranking of 97 in the world the following year.

== Grand Prix career finals ==
=== Doubles: 1 (1–0) ===
Result	W-L	Date	Tournament	Surface	Partner	Opponents	Score
Win	1–0	Sep 1982	Palermo, Italy	Clay	(Italy) Enzo Vattuone	(Uruguay) José Luis Damiani (Uruguay) Diego Pérez	6–4, 6–7, 6–3

== Challenger titles ==
=== Doubles: (1) ===
Year	Tournament	Surface	Partner	Opponents	Score
1982	Messina, Italy	Clay	(Italy) Enzo Vattuone	(Spain) Eduardo Osta (Spain) Roberto Vizcaíno	6–0, 4–6, 6–2
