= Alejandro Pierola =

Chilean tennis player (born 1949)

- Country (sports): Chile
- Born: 20 November 1949 (age 76) Santiago, Presidential Republic Chile
- Plays: Right-handed

Singles
- Career record: 16–46
- Career titles: 0
- Highest ranking: No. 82 (26 Dec 1979)

Grand Slam singles results
- French Open: 2R (1978)

Doubles
- Career record: 15–37
- Career titles: 0
- Highest ranking: No. 174 (3 Jan 1983)

Grand Slam doubles results
- French Open: 1R (1978, 1980, 1982)

Alejandro Pierola (born 20 November 1949) is a former professional tennis player from Chile.

== Career ==
Pierola was a quarter-finalist in Grand Prix tournaments at Palermo in 1981 and Venice in 1982. He made two Grand Prix doubles semi-finals in 1981, at Bordeaux, with Guillermo Aubone and Palermo, with Pedro Rebolledo.

He competed in the French Open three times during his career and played in both the men's singles and men's doubles at each. At the 1978 French Open he had a win over Bernard Mitton, before losing in the second round to Manuel Orantes. He exited in the opening round of the singles in 1980 and 1982, with losses to José Luis Clerc and Pavel Složil.

== Challenger titles ==
=== Singles: (1) ===
No.	Year	Tournament	Surface	Opponent	Score
1.	1981	Parioli, Italy	Clay	(Italy) Corrado Barazzutti	6–4, 3–6, 6–4

=== Doubles: (3) ===
No.	Year	Tournament	Surface	Partner	Opponents	Score
1.	1979	Cuneo, Italy	Clay	(Chile) Belus Prajoux	(France) Dominique Bedel (France) Christophe Freyss	6–4, 7–6
2.	1981	Messina, Italy	Clay	(Chile) Belus Prajoux	(Italy) Mario Calautti (Italy) Roberto Calautti	3–6, 6–4, 7–6
3.	1982	Galatina, Italy	Clay	(Spain) Sergio Casal	(Italy) Gianni Marchetti (Italy) Vincenzo Naso	6–4, 6–4
