= Jimmy Brown (tennis) =

American tennis player

- Country (sports): United States
- Residence: Largo, Florida
- Born: April 28, 1965 (age 60); Hialeah, Florida, U.S.
- Height: 5 ft 11 in (1.80 m)
- Turned pro: 1981
- Retired: 1992
- Plays: Right-handed
- Prize money: $560,131

Singles
- Career record: 139–174 (44.4%)
- Career titles: 0
- Highest ranking: No. 42 (November 14, 1983)

Grand Slam singles results
- Australian Open: 1R (1989, 1990)
- French Open: 2R (1984, 1989)
- US Open: 3R (1984)

Doubles
- Career record: 6–28
- Career titles: 0
- Highest ranking: No. 176 (October 5, 1987)

Jimmy Brown (born April 28, 1965) is a retired professional tennis player (in both singles and doubles play) from the United States. Brown reached a career-high singles ranking of World No. 42 in November 1983 and was runner-up in 4 ATP Tour singles tournaments. His best result at a grand slam was the third round at the 1984 US Open.

== Career finals ==
=== Singles (4 runners-up) ===
Legend Grand Slam (0) Tennis Masters Cup (0) ATP Masters Series (0) Grand Prix (4)	Titles by surface Hard (1) Grass (0) Clay (3) Carpet (0)

Result	W/L	Date	Tournament	Surface	Opponent	Score
Loss	0–1	Jun 1983	Venice, Italy	Clay	(Argentina) Roberto Argüello	6–2, 2–6, 0–6
Loss	0–2	May 1984	Florence, Italy	Clay	(Italy) Francesco Cancellotti	1–6, 4–6
Loss	0–3	Sep 1985	Bordeaux, France	Clay	(Uruguay) Diego Pérez	4–6, 6–7
Loss	0–4	Feb 1989	Guarujá, Brazil	Hard	(Brazil) Luiz Mattar	6–7, 4–6
