= Pedro Rebolledo =

Chilean tennis player

- Country (sports): Chile
- Residence: Santiago, Chile
- Born: 17 December 1960 (age 65) Santiago, Chile
- Turned pro: 1979
- Retired: 1992
- Plays: Right-handed
- Prize money: $435,551

Singles
- Career record: 104–114
- Career titles: 3
- Highest ranking: No. 36 (1 February 1982)

Grand Slam singles results
- French Open: 2R (1990)
- Wimbledon: 1R (1991)
- US Open: 1R (1981, 1984)

Doubles
- Career record: 45–67
- Career titles: 1
- Highest ranking: No. 162 (2 January 1984)

Grand Slam doubles results
- French Open: 3R (1983)
- US Open: 1R (1981)

Team competitions
- Davis Cup: QF (1982)

Pedro Rebolledo (born 17 December 1960) is a former professional tennis player from Chile. He achieved a career-high singles ranking of world No. 36 in 1982. Rebolledo won three career ATP singles titles.

Rebolledo participated in 17 Davis Cup ties for Chile from 1981 to 1992, posting a 19–11 record in singles and a 1–1 record in doubles.

== Career finals ==
=== Singles (3 titles, 2 runner-ups) ===
| Result | W/L | Date | Tournament | Surface | Opponent | Score |
|---|---|---|---|---|---|---|
| Loss | 0–1 | Sep 1981 | Palermo, Italy | Clay | (Spain) Manuel Orantes | 4–6, 0–6, 0–6 |
| Win | 1–1 | Jan 1982 | Viña del Mar, Chile | Clay | (Mexico) Raúl Ramírez | 6–4, 3–6, 7–6 |
| Win | 2–1 | Nov 1983 | Salvador, Bahia, Brazil | Hard | (Brazil) Júlio Góes | 6–3, 6–3 |
| Loss | 2–2 | Apr 1984 | Bari, Italy | Clay | (Sweden) Henrik Sundström | 5–7, 4–6 |
| Win | 3–2 | Aug 1987 | Saint-Vincent, Italy | Clay | (Italy) Francesco Cancellotti | 7–6, 4–6, 6–3 |

=== Doubles (1 title) ===
| Result | W/L | Date | Tournament | Surface | Partner | Opponents | Score |
|---|---|---|---|---|---|---|---|
| Win | 1–0 | Nov 1982 | Quito, Ecuador | Clay | (Chile) Jaime Fillol | (United States) Egan Adams (United States) Rocky Royer | 6–2, 6–3 |
