= Víctor Pecci =

Paraguayan tennis player

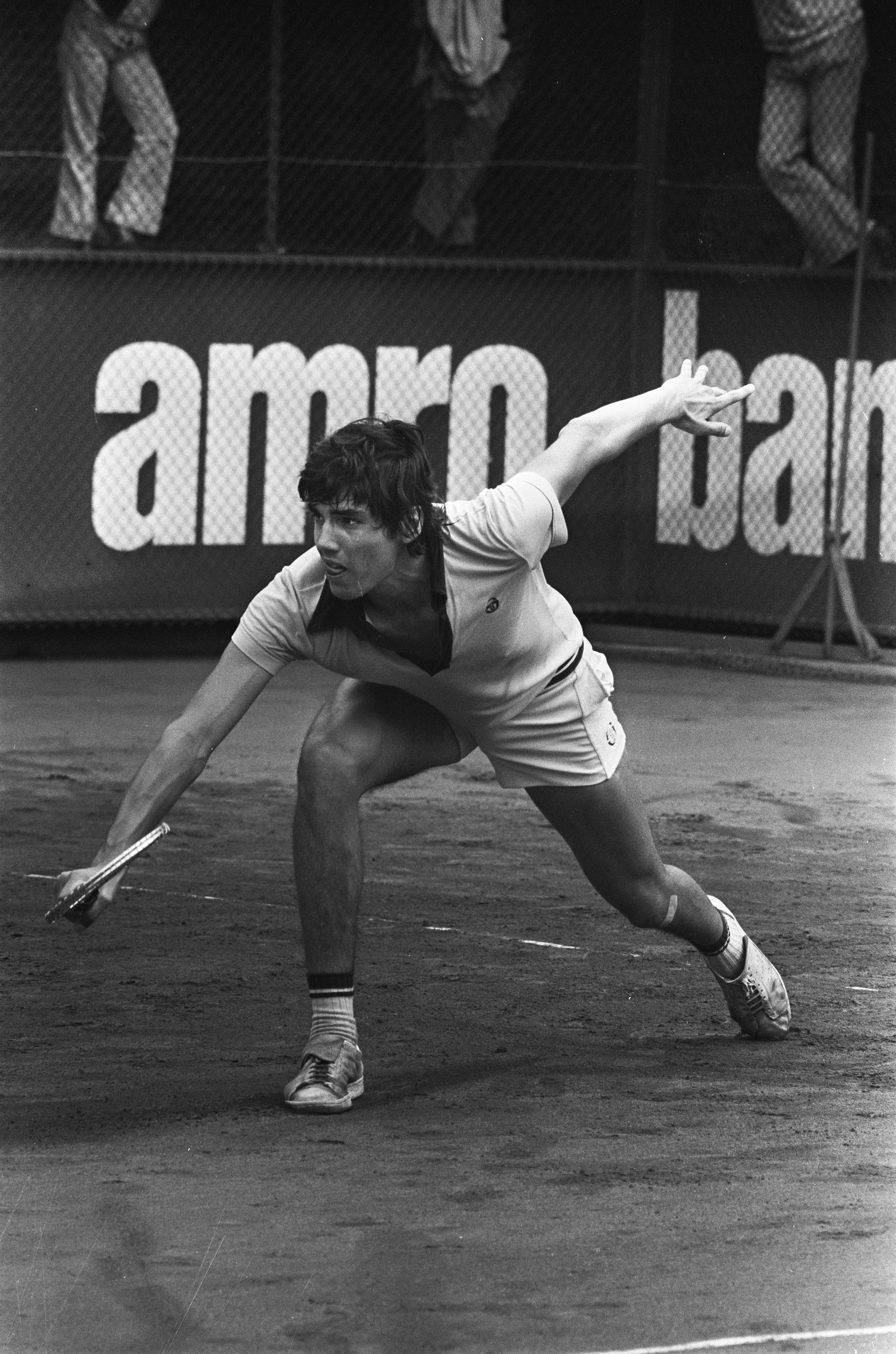
- Country (sports): Paraguay
- Residence: Asunción, Paraguay
- Born: 15 October 1955 (age 70) Asunción, Paraguay
- Height: 1.93 m (6 ft 4 in)
- Turned pro: 1976
- Retired: 1990
- Plays: Right-handed (one-handed backhand)
- Prize money: $994,408

Singles
- Career record: 358–243 (59.6%)
- Career titles: 10
- Highest ranking: No. 9 (24 March 1980)

Grand Slam singles results
- Australian Open: 2R (1980)
- French Open: F (1979)
- Wimbledon: 3R (1979, 1980)
- US Open: 3R (1979)

Doubles
- Career record: 194–170 (53.3%)
- Career titles: 12
- Highest ranking: No. 8 (3 January 1979)

Team competitions
- Davis Cup: 28–17

Víctor Pecci Sr. (born October 15, 1955) is a Paraguayan former professional tennis player.

He was ranked as high as world No. 9 in singles in 1980 and world No. 31 in doubles in 1984. Pecci is famous for reaching the 1979 French Open final. He beat Guillermo Vilas in the quarterfinals and Jimmy Connors in the semifinals, but lost to three-time champion Björn Borg in the final in four sets. He also reached the semifinals in 1981 and was runner-up in Rome. Pecci won the French Open boys' singles in 1973.

== Grand Slam finals ==
=== Singles: 1 (1 runner-up) ===
Result	Year	Championship	Surface	Opponent	Score
Loss	1979	French Open	Clay	(Sweden) Björn Borg	3–6, 1–6, 7–6^{(8–6)}, 4–6

== Grand Slam singles performance timeline ==
Key
W	F	SF	QF	#R	RR	Q#	DNQ	A	NH

(W) winner; (F) finalist; (SF) semifinalist; (QF) quarterfinalist; (#R) rounds 4, 3, 2, 1; (RR) round-robin stage; (Q#) qualification round; (DNQ) did not qualify; (A) absent; (NH) not held; (SR) strike rate (events won / competed); (W–L) win–loss record.

Tournament	1974	1975	1976	1977		1978	1979	1980	1981	1982	1983	1984	1985	1986	Career W-L
Australian Open	A	A	A	A	A	A	A	2R	A	1R	A	A	A	NH	1–2
French Open	1R	Q3	A	1R		4R	F	2R	SF	2R	2R	1R	1R	1R	17–11
Wimbledon	Q3	2R	2R	A		1R	3R	3R	1R	A	A	A	1R	A	6–7
US Open	A	1R	2R	1R		2R	3R	2R	A	A	A	A	1R	A	5–7
Win–loss	0–1	1–2	2–2	0–2		4–3	10–3	5–4	5–2	1–2	1–1	0–1	0–3	0–1	29–27

Note: The Australian Open was held twice in 1977, in January and December.

== Career finals ==
=== Singles: 22 (10 titles / 12 runner-ups) ===
Result	W–L	Date	Tournament	Surface	Opponent	Score
Win	1–0	Apr 1976	Madrid, Spain	Clay	(France) Éric Deblicker	7–5, 7–6, 3–6, 2–6, 6–4
Win	2–0	Jun 1976	Berlin, West Germany	Hard	(West Germany) Hans-Jürgen Pohmann	6–1, 6–2, 5–7, 6–3
Loss	2–1	May 1977	Munich, West Germany	Clay	(Socialist Federal Republic of Yugoslavia) Željko Franulović	1–6, 1–6, 7–6, 5–7
Win	3–1	Nov 1978	Bogotá, Colombia	Clay	(West Germany) Rolf Gehring	6–4, 3–6, 6–3, 6–3
Loss	3–2	Nov 1978	Buenos Aires, Argentina	Clay	(Argentina) José Luis Clerc	4–6, 4–6
Loss	3–3	Dec 1978	Santiago, Chile	Clay	(Argentina) José Luis Clerc	6–3, 3–6, 1–6
Win	4–3	Apr 1979	Nice, France	Clay	(Australia) John Alexander	6–3, 6–2, 7–5
Loss	4–4	Jun 1979	French Open, Paris	Clay	(Sweden) Björn Borg	3–6, 1–6, 7–6^{(8–6)}, 4–6
Loss	4–5	Jun 1979	London Queen's Club, UK	Grass	(United States) John McEnroe	7–6^{(7–2)}, 1–6, 1–6
Loss	4–6	Jul 1979	Washington, D.C., U.S.	Clay	(Argentina) Guillermo Vilas	6–7^{(4–7)}, 6–7^{(3–7)}
Win	5–6	Nov 1979	Quito, Ecuador	Clay	(Spain) José Higueras	2–6, 6–4, 6–2
Win	6–6	Nov 1979	Bogotá, Colombia	Clay	(Colombia) Jairo Velasco Sr.	6–3, 6–4
Loss	6–7	Dec 1979	Johannesburg, South Africa	Hard	(Zimbabwe Rhodesia) Andrew Pattison	6–2, 3–6, 2–6, 3–6
Loss	6–8	Nov 1980	Quito, Ecuador	Clay	(Argentina) José Luis Clerc	4–6, 6–1, 8–10
Win	7–8	Nov 1980	Santiago, Chile	Clay	(France) Christophe Freyss	4–6, 6–4, 6–3
Win	8–8	Feb 1981	Viña del Mar, Chile	Clay	(Spain) José Higueras	6–4, 6–0
Loss	8–9	Feb 1981	Mar del Plata, Argentina	Clay	(Argentina) Guillermo Vilas	6–2, 3–6, 1–2 ret.
Win	9–9	Apr 1981	Bournemouth, UK	Clay	(Hungary) Balázs Taróczy	6–3, 6–4
Loss	9–10	May 1981	Rome, Italy	Clay	(Argentina) José Luis Clerc	3–6, 4–6, 0–6
Win	10–10	Feb 1983	Viña del Mar, Chile	Clay	(Chile) Jaime Fillol	2–6, 7–5, 6–4
Loss	10–11	Jul 1984	Kitzbühel, Austria	Clay	(Spain) José Higueras	5–7, 6–3, 1–6
Loss	10–12	Apr 1985	Nice, France	Clay	(France) Henri Leconte	4–6, 4–6

=== Doubles: 18 (12 titles / 6 runner-ups) ===
Result	W–L	Date	Tournament	Surface	Partner	Opponents	Score
Loss	0–1	Aug 1976	North Conway, U.S.	Clay	(Argentina) Ricardo Cano	(United States) Brian Gottfried (Mexico) Raúl Ramírez	3–6, 0–6
Win	1–1	Nov 1976	São Paulo, Brazil	Carpet (i)	(Argentina) Lito Álvarez	(Argentina) Ricardo Cano (Chile) Belus Prajoux	6–4, 3–6, 6–3
Win	2–1	Apr 1978	Milan, Italy	Carpet (i)	(Spain) José Higueras	(Poland) Wojciech Fibak (Mexico) Raúl Ramírez	5–7, 7–6, 7–6
Loss	2–2	May 1978	Hamburg, West Germany	Clay	(Spain) Antonio Muñoz	(Poland) Wojciech Fibak (Netherlands) Tom Okker	2–6, 4–6
Win	3–2	May 1978	Rome Masters, Italy	Clay	(Chile) Belus Prajoux	(Czechoslovakia) Jan Kodeš (Czechoslovakia) Tomáš Šmíd	6–7, 7–6, 6–1
Win	4–2	Jul 1978	Louisville, United States	Clay	(Poland) Wojciech Fibak	(United States) Victor Amaya (Australia) John James	6–4, 6–7, 6–4
Win	5–2	Aug 1978	Boston, United States	Clay	(Hungary) Balázs Taróczy	(Switzerland) Heinz Günthardt (United States) Van Winitsky	6–3, 3–6, 6–1
Win	6–2	Oct 1978	Vienna, Austria	Hard (i)	(Hungary) Balázs Taróczy	(South Africa) Bob Hewitt (South Africa) Frew McMillan	6–3, 6–7, 6–4
Loss	6–3	Nov 1978	Bogotá, Colombia	Clay	(Chile) Hans Gildemeister	(Chile) Álvaro Fillol (Chile) Jaime Fillol	4–6, 3–6
Win	7–3	Dec 1978	Santiago, Chile	Clay	(Chile) Hans Gildemeister	(Chile) Álvaro Fillol (Chile) Jaime Fillol	6–4, 6–3
Loss	7–4	Apr 1979	Monte Carlo, Monaco	Clay	(Hungary) Balázs Taróczy	(Romania) Ilie Năstase (Mexico) Raúl Ramírez	3–6, 4–6
Loss	7–5	Sep 1980	Palermo, Italy	Clay	(Hungary) Balázs Taróczy	(Italy) Gianni Ocleppo (Ecuador) Ricardo Ycaza	2–6, 2–6
Win	8–5	Apr 1981	Bournemouth, England	Clay	(Argentina) Ricardo Cano	(United Kingdom) Buster Mottram (Czechoslovakia) Tomáš Šmíd	6–4, 3–6, 6–3
Win	9–5	May 1983	Florence, Italy	Clay	(Paraguay) Francisco González	(France) Dominique Bedel (France) Bernard Fritz	4–6, 6–4, 7–6
Win	10–5	May 1983	Rome Masters, Italy	Clay	(Paraguay) Francisco González	(Sweden) Jan Gunnarsson (United States) Mike Leach	6–2, 6–7, 6–4
Win	11–5	Jun 1983	Venice, Italy	Clay	(Paraguay) Francisco González	(United States) Steve Krulevitz (Hungary) Zoltán Kuhárszky	6–1, 6–2
Loss	11–6	Oct 1984	Barcelona, Spain	Clay	(Argentina) Martín Jaite	(Czechoslovakia) Pavel Složil (Czechoslovakia) Tomáš Šmíd	2–6, 0–6
Win	12–6	Jul 1985	Washington, D.C., U.S.	Clay	(Chile) Hans Gildemeister	(Australia) David Graham (Hungary) Balázs Taróczy	6–3, 1–6, 6–4

Awards
Preceded by John McEnroe	ATP Most Improved Player; 1979	Succeeded by not awarded, 1980; Ivan Lendl, 1981
