= Carlos Castellan =

Argentine tennis player (born 1962)

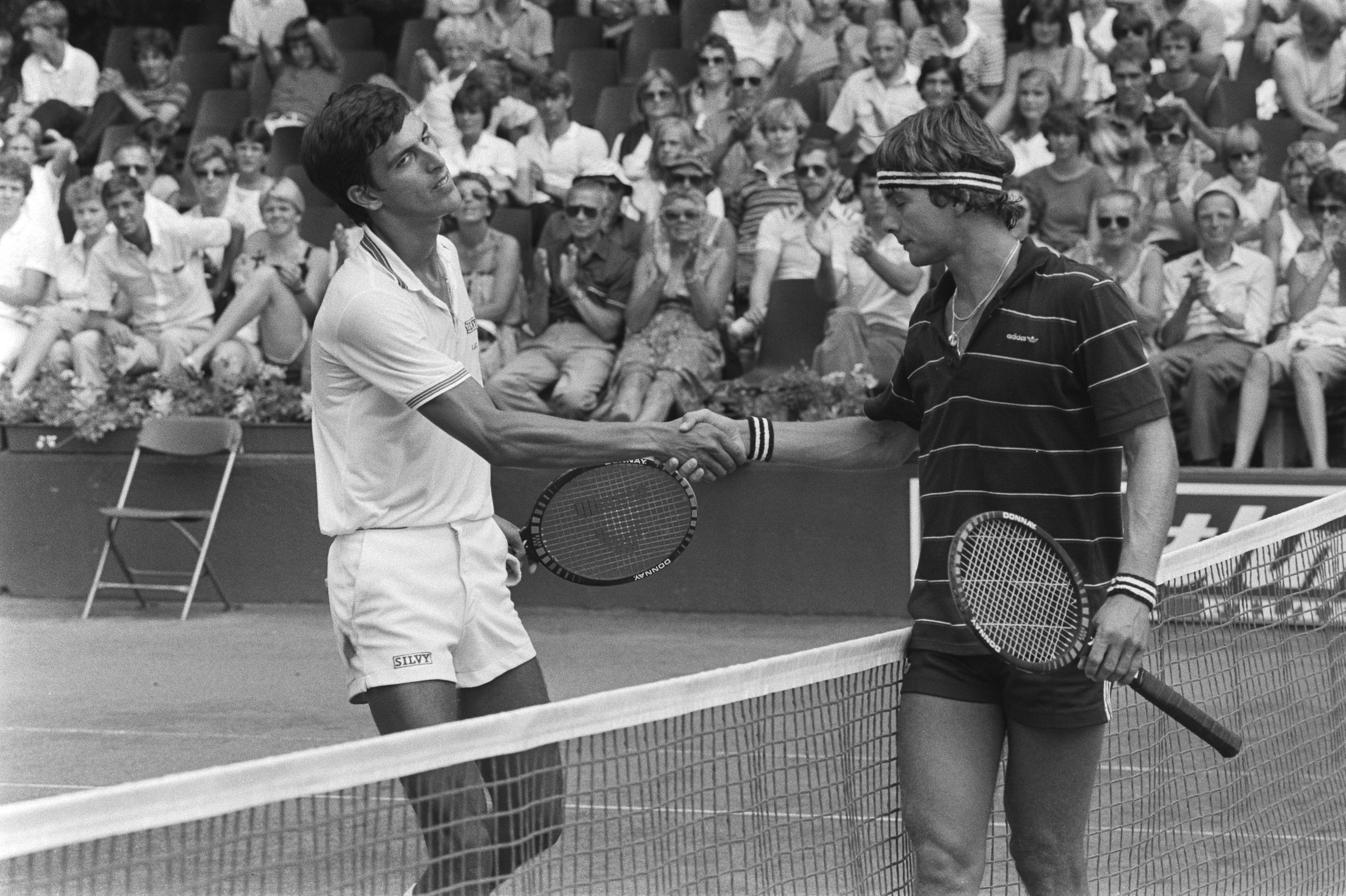
- Castellan & Eric Wilborts (1982)
- Country (sports): Argentina
- Residence: Santa Fe
- Born: 8 February 1962 (age 63) Rosario, Argentina
- Height: 1.90 m (6 ft 3 in)
- Plays: Right-handed

Singles
- Career record: 26–42
- Career titles: 0
- Highest ranking: No. 122 (3 Jan 1983)

Grand Slam singles results
- French Open: 2R (1982, 1984)

Doubles
- Career record: 9–26
- Career titles: 0
- Highest ranking: No. 274 (3 Jan 1983)

Carlos Castellan (born 8 February 1962) is a former professional tennis player from Argentina.

== Career ==
Castellan was a semi-finalist in the boys' singles event at the 1980 French Open. Also that year, he made the Orange Bowl final, which he lost to Joakim Nyström.

The Argentinian was a member of back to back Galea Cup winning sides, in 1980 and 1981. He also represented his country at Davis Cup level, once, in 1982, when he lost a singles rubber to Hans-Dieter Beutel of West Germany.

Castellan made two Grand Prix quarter-finals in 1981, at the Mar del Plata Open and Chilean Open.

In the 1982 French Open, he beat Frenchman Jérôme Potier in an opening round match which went to five sets. He was then eliminated by Andrés Gómez. At the French Open two years later, Castellan defeated fellow qualifier Simon Youl, but again fell in the second round, this time to Harold Solomon, in four sets.

He reached the quarter-finals at the Dutch Open in 1982 and Venice the following year. When he returned to the Dutch Open in 1984 he had his best-ever Grand Prix showing, making the semi-finals.
