= Pablo Arraya =

Peruvian tennis player

- Full name: Pablo Guillermo Arraya
- Country (sports): Peru
- Born: 21 October 1961 (age 64) Córdoba, Argentina
- Height: 1.80 m (5 ft 11 in)
- Turned pro: 1980
- Retired: 1 October 1991
- Plays: Right-handed

Singles
- Career record: 176-173
- Career titles: 1
- Highest ranking: No. 29 (13 August 1984)

Grand Slam singles results
- Australian Open: 1R (1992)
- French Open: 3R (1984)
- Wimbledon: 1R (1984, 1988, 1991)
- US Open: 1R (1983, 1984, 1986, 1991)

Other tournaments
- Olympic Games: 1R (1992)

Doubles
- Career record: 81–115
- Career titles: 1
- Highest ranking: No. 85 (25 June 1984)

Grand Slam doubles results
- French Open: 1R (1983, 1984, 1985, 1989)
- Wimbledon: 1R (1984)
- US Open: 1R (1991)

Mixed doubles
- Career record: 5–5
- Career titles: 0

Grand Slam mixed doubles results
- French Open: QF (1984)

Pablo Guillermo Arraya (born 21 October 1961) is a former tennis player from Peru.

Arraya was born in Córdoba, Argentina, and moved to Peru at a young age with his family. He began playing tennis at nine years old and turned professional in 1980. He represented his native country at the 1992 Summer Olympics in Barcelona, where he was defeated in the first round by Argentina's Javier Frana. He won one career title in singles. He reached his highest singles ATP-ranking on 13 August 1984, when he became the number 29 of the world. He was the first player beaten by Andre Agassi in the main draw of a Grand Slam tournament at the French Open in 1987. His sister is Laura Arraya, a former tennis player. He is now a trainer and owner of the Arraya Tennis Academy in Key Biscayne.

== Career finals ==
=== Singles (1 title, 4 runner-ups) ===
Result	W/L	Date	Tournament	Surface	Opponent	Score
Loss	0–1	Sep 1981	Madrid, Spain	Clay	(Czechoslovakia) Ivan Lendl	3–6, 2–6, 2–6
Loss	0–2	Sep 1982	Bordeaux, France	Clay	(Chile) Hans Gildemeister	5–7, 1–6
Win	1–2	Sep 1983	Bordeaux, France	Clay	(Spain) Juan Aguilera	7–5, 7–5
Loss	1–3	Nov 1983	Toulouse, France	Carpet	(Switzerland) Heinz Günthardt	0–6, 2–6
Loss	1–4	Sep 1986	Palermo, Italy	Clay	(Sweden) Ulf Stenlund	2–6, 3–6

=== Doubles (1 title, 3 runner-ups) ===
Result	W/L	Date	Tournament	Surface	Partner	Opponents	Score
Loss	0–1	Aug 1982	North Conway, U.S.	Clay	(United States) Eric Fromm	(United States) Sherwood Stewart (United States) Ferdi Taygan	2–6, 6–7
Win	1–1	Sep 1983	Palermo, Italy	Clay	(Argentina) José Luis Clerc	(South Africa) Tian Viljoen (South Africa) Danie Visser	1–6, 6–4, 6–4
Loss	1–2	Jun 1988	Athens, Greece	Clay	(Czechoslovakia) Karel Nováček	(Sweden) Rikard Bergh (Sweden) Per Henricsson	4–6, 5–7
Loss	1–3	Jul 1991	Kitzbühel, Austria	Clay	(Ukraine) Dimitri Poliakov	(Spain) Tomás Carbonell (Spain) Francisco Roig	7–6, 2–6, 4–6

== Arraya Tennis Academy ==
Arraya Tennis Academy was first opened in Lima, Peru in 1980. Laura Arraya and Heinz Gildemeister direct the academy in Peru. The location in Key Biscayne was opened in 1992 and is managed by Gildemeister and Arraya. The academy offers training for beginners and advanced, an after school program, cardio tennis and a summer program.
