= Campionati Internazionali di Sicilia =

Tennis tournament in Italy

Internazionali di Sicilia
- 2026 Internazionali di Sicilia

Tournament information
- Tour: ILTF World Circuit (1935-1989); ATP Tour (1990–2006); ATP Challenger Tour (2026- )
- Founded: 1935
- Location: Palermo, Italy
- Venue: Circolo Tennis Palermo
- Surface: Clay / outdoor
- Website: Website

The Campionati Internazionali di Sicilia (International Championships of Sicily), also known as the Palermo Open, was a combined men's and women's clay court tennis tournament founded in 1935 and played annually at the Circolo Tennis Palermo in Palermo in Italy. In 1971 the women's event was discontinued leaving just the men's event that ran until 2006. The men's tournament returned as a Challenger Tour event in 2026, the 53rd edition of the tournament.

== History ==
The International Championships of Sicily were established in 1935 as a combined tournament for men and women. In 1955 the Campionati Internazionali di Sicilia were disputed in Messina and won among the men Nicola Pietrangeli who beat in final Fausto Gardini in five sets, and in female tournament Silvana Lazzarino that won in final against Lea Pericoli. The tournament continued under a joint format until 1971 when the women's event was discontinued. In 1988 a new international tournament for women held in Palermo was reestablished as the Internazionali Femminili di Palermo, also known as the Palermo Ladies Open.

The tournament was a part of the ATP Tour schedule from 1990 to 2006. The event was part of the ATP World Series from 1990 until 1999 and part of its successor, the ATP International Series, from 2000 until its final edition in 2006. That year the ATP bought back the tournament sanction. In 2009 a new successor tournament to this event was established called the Sicilia Classic.

== Finals ==
=== Men's singles ===
Year	Champions	Runners-up	Score
1935	(Italy) Giovanni Palmieri	(France) Jean Lesueur	7–5, ret.
1936	(Italy) Giovanni Palmieri (2)	(Italy) Augusto Rado	2–6, 6–3, 4–6, 6–2, 6–3
1937	(Italy) Giovanni Palmieri (3)	(Hungary) György Dallos	6–2, 6–3, 6–2
1938	(Czechoslovakia) Vojtek Wodicka	(Switzerland) Boris Maneff	6–4, 2–6, 6–4, 6–3
1939	(Romania) Constantin Tănăsescu	(Italy) Vanni Canepele	7–5, 6–4, 6–2
1940	(Hungary) József Asbóth	(United Kingdom) George Lyttleton Rogers	6–0, 7–5, 6–4
1941/1950	Not held		
1951	(Egypt) Jaroslav Drobný	(United States) Dick Savitt	6–4, 2–6, 6–1, 2–6, 6–4
1952	(Egypt) Jaroslav Drobný (2)	(Italy) Fausto Gardini	1–6, 6–4, 6–4, 6–4
1953	(United States) Budge Patty	(United States) Bernard Bartzen	3–6, 6–4, 3–6, 6–3, 6–1
1954/1955	Not held		
1956	(Italy) Giuseppe Merlo	(United States) Hugh Stewart	6–4, 8–10, 6–3, 6–2
1957	(Italy) Giuseppe Merlo (2)	(United States) Ham Richardson	2–6, 6–4, 6–1, 6–0
1958	(Italy) Nicola Pietrangeli	(Australia) Mervyn Rose	7–5, 6–4, 8–6
1959	(Australia) Neale Fraser	(Italy) Nicola Pietrangeli	7–5, 6–4, 8–6
1960	(Mexico) Mario Llamas	(Italy) Giuseppe Merlo	6–4, 3–6, 6–3, 4–6, 6–2
1961	Not held		
1962	(Australia) Rod Laver	(Australia) Neale Fraser	7–5, 6–4, 8–6
1963	(Italy) Nicola Pietrangeli (2)	(Socialist Federal Republic of Yugoslavia) Boro Jovanović	6–4, 6–2, 6–4
1964	(Italy) Nicola Pietrangeli (3)	(Brazil) Edison Mandarino	6–3, 6–2, 1–6, 6–1
1965	(Australia) Martin Mulligan	(Colombia) William Alvarez	6–1, 6–1, 6–2
1966	Not held		
1967	(Soviet Union) Alexander Metreveli	(Canada) Mike Belkin	7–5, 6–4, 6–4
1968	(Romania) Ion Țiriac	(United States) Marty Riessen	8–6, 6–0, 1–6, 6–4
1969	(Romania) Ion Țiriac (2)	(Romania) Ilie Năstase	4–6, 6–0, 6–2, 2–6, 6–2
1970	(Hungary) István Gulyás	(Romania) Ilie Năstase	6–1, 6–4, 6–4
1971	(United Kingdom) Roger Taylor	(France) Pierre Barthès	6–3, 4–6, 7–6, 6–2
1972	Not held		
1973	(Australia) Martin Mulligan (2)	(Japan) Jun Kuki	6–0, 5–7, 6–3
1974/1978	Not held		
1979	(Sweden) Björn Borg	(Italy) Corrado Barazzutti	6–4, 6–0, 6–4
1980	(Argentina) Guillermo Vilas	(Australia) Paul McNamee	6–4, 6–0, 6–0
1981	(Spain) Manuel Orantes	(Chile) Pedro Rebolledo	6–4, 6–0, 6–0
1982	(Bolivia) Mario Martínez	(Australia) John Alexander	6–4, 7–5
1983	(United States) Jimmy Arias	(Argentina) José Luis Clerc	6–2, 2–6, 6–0
1984	(Italy) Francesco Cancellotti	(Czechoslovakia) Miloslav Mečíř	6–0, 6–3
1985	(France) Thierry Tulasne	(Sweden) Joakim Nyström	6–3, 6–1
1986	(Sweden) Ulf Stenlund	(Peru) Pablo Arraya	6–2, 6–3
1987	(Argentina) Martín Jaite	(Czechoslovakia) Karel Nováček	7–6, 6–7, 6–4
1988	(Sweden) Mats Wilander	(Sweden) Kent Carlsson	6–1, 3–6, 6–4
1989	(Argentina) Guillermo Pérez Roldán	(Italy) Paolo Canè	6–1, 6–4
1990	(Argentina) Franco Davín	(Spain) Juan Aguilera	6–1, 6–1
1991	(France) Frédéric Fontang	(Spain) Emilio Sánchez	1–6, 6–3, 6–3
1992	(Spain) Sergi Bruguera	(Spain) Emilio Sánchez	6–1, 6–3
1993	(Austria) Thomas Muster	(Spain) Sergi Bruguera	7–6^{(7–2)}, 7-5
1994	(Spain) Alberto Berasategui	(Spain) Àlex Corretja	2–6, 7–6^{(8–6)}, 6–4
1995	(Spain) Francisco Clavet	(Spain) Jordi Burillo	6–7^{(3–7)}, 6–3, 7–6^{(7–1)}
1996	(Morocco) Karim Alami	(Romania) Adrian Voinea	7–5, 2–1 retired
1997	(Spain) Alberto Berasategui (2)	(Slovakia) Dominik Hrbatý	6–4, 6–2
1998	(Argentina) Mariano Puerta	(Argentina) Franco Squillari	6–3, 6–2
1999	(France) Arnaud Di Pasquale	(Spain) Alberto Berasategui	6–1, 6–3
2000	(Belgium) Olivier Rochus	(Italy) Diego Nargiso	7–6^{(16–14)}, 6–1
2001	(Spain) Félix Mantilla	(Argentina) David Nalbandian	7–6^{(7–2)}, 6–4
2002	(Chile) Fernando González	(Argentina) José Acasuso	5–7, 6–3, 6–1
2003	(Chile) Nicolás Massú	(France) Paul-Henri Mathieu	1–6, 6–2, 7–6^{(7–0)}
2004	(Czech Republic) Tomáš Berdych	(Italy) Filippo Volandri	6–3, 6–3
2005	(Russia) Igor Andreev	(Italy) Filippo Volandri	0–6, 6–1, 6–3
2006	(Italy) Filippo Volandri	(Ecuador) Nicolás Lapentti	5–7, 6–1, 6–3
2007–2025	Not held - see Sicilia Classic in 2009–2011		
2026	(Italy) Francesco Passaro	(Czech Republic) Jonáš Forejtek	6–3, 6–7^{(2–7)}, 7–6^{(7–4)}

=== Doubles ===
Year	Champions	Runners-up	Score
1979	(Australia) Peter McNamara (Australia) Paul McNamee	(Egypt) Ismail El Shafei (United Kingdom) John Feaver	7–5, 7–6
1980	(Italy) Gianni Ocleppo (Ecuador) Ricardo Ycaza	(Paraguay) Víctor Pecci (Hungary) Balázs Taróczy	6–2, 6–2
1981	(Uruguay) José Luis Damiani (Uruguay) Diego Pérez	(Chile) Jaime Fillol (Chile) Belus Prajoux	6–1, 6–4
1982	(Italy) Gianni Marchetti (Italy) Enzo Vattuone	(Uruguay) José Luis Damiani (Uruguay) Diego Pérez	6–4, 6–7, 6–3
1983	(Peru) Pablo Arraya (Argentina) José Luis Clerc	(South Africa) Tian Viljoen (South Africa) Danie Visser	1–6, 6–4, 6–4
1984	(Czechoslovakia) Tomáš Šmíd (United States) Blaine Willenborg	(Italy) Claudio Panatta (Sweden) Henrik Sundström	6–7, 6–3, 6–0
1985	(United Kingdom) Colin Dowdeswell (Sweden) Joakim Nyström	(Spain) Sergio Casal (Spain) Emilio Sánchez	6–4, 6–7, 7–6
1986	(Italy) Paolo Canè (Italy) Simone Colombo	(Switzerland) Claudio Mezzadri (Italy) Gianni Ocleppo	7–5, 6–3
1987	(Mexico) Leonardo Lavalle (Italy) Claudio Panatta	(Czechoslovakia) Petr Korda (Czechoslovakia) Tomáš Šmíd	3–6, 6–4, 6–4
1988	(Peru) Carlos di Laura (Uruguay) Marcelo Filippini	(Argentina) Alberto Mancini (Argentina) Christian Miniussi	6–2, 6–0
1989	(West Germany) Peter Ballauff (West Germany) Rüdiger Haas	(Socialist Federal Republic of Yugoslavia) Goran Ivanišević (Italy) Diego Nargiso	6–2, 6–7, 6–4
1990	(Spain) Sergio Casal (Spain) Emilio Sánchez	(Spain) Carlos Costa (Argentina) Horacio de la Peña	6–3, 6–4
1991	(Netherlands) Jacco Eltingh (Netherlands) Tom Kempers	(Spain) Emilio Sánchez (Spain) Javier Sánchez	3–6, 6–3, 6–3
1992	(Sweden) Johan Donar (Sweden) Ola Jonsson	(Argentina) Horacio de la Peña (Czechoslovakia) Vojtěch Flégl	5–7, 6–3, 6–4
1993	(Spain) Sergio Casal (Spain) Emilio Sánchez	(Argentina) Juan Garat (Mexico) Jorge Lozano	6–3, 6–3
1994	(Netherlands) Tom Kempers (United States) Jack Waite	(United Kingdom) Neil Broad (United States) Greg Van Emburgh	7–6, 6–4
1995	(Spain) Àlex Corretja (France) Fabrice Santoro	(Netherlands) Hendrik Jan Davids (South Africa) Piet Norval	6–7, 6–4, 6–3
1996	(Australia) Andrew Kratzmann (South Africa) Marcos Ondruska	(Italy) Cristian Brandi (Spain) Emilio Sánchez	7–6, 6–4
1997	(Australia) Andrew Kratzmann (Czech Republic) Libor Pimek	(Netherlands) Hendrik Jan Davids (Argentina) Daniel Orsanic	3–6, 6–3, 7–6
1998	(United States) Donald Johnson (United States) Francisco Montana	(Argentina) Pablo Albano (Argentina) Daniel Orsanic	6–4, 7–6
1999	(Argentina) Mariano Hood (Argentina) Sebastián Prieto	(South Africa) Lan Bale (Spain) Alberto Martín	6–3, 6–1
2000	(Spain) Tomás Carbonell (Argentina) Martín García	(Argentina) Pablo Albano (Germany) Marc-Kevin Goellner	W/O
2001	(Spain) Tomás Carbonell (Argentina) Daniel Orsanic	(Argentina) Enzo Artoni (Spain) Emilio Benfele Álvarez	6–2, 2–6, 6–2
2002	(Argentina) Lucas Arnold Ker (Argentina) Luis Lobo	(Czech Republic) František Čermák (Czech Republic) Leoš Friedl	6–4, 4–6, 6–2
2003	(Argentina) Lucas Arnold Ker (Argentina) Mariano Hood	(Czech Republic) František Čermák (Czech Republic) Leoš Friedl	7–6, 6–7, 6–3
2004	(Argentina) Lucas Arnold Ker (Argentina) Mariano Hood	(Argentina) Gastón Etlis (Argentina) Martín Rodríguez	7–5, 6–2
2005	(Argentina) Martín García (Argentina) Mariano Hood	(Poland) Mariusz Fyrstenberg (Poland) Marcin Matkowski	6–2, 6–3
2006	(Argentina) Martín García (Peru) Luis Horna	(Poland) Mariusz Fyrstenberg (Poland) Marcin Matkowski	7–6, 7–6
2007–2025	Not held		
2026	(Ukraine) Oleksandr Ovcharenko (Germany) Kai Wehnelt	(Czech Republic) Jonáš Forejtek (Germany) Max Wiskandt	7–5, 6–2

== See also ==
- Sicilia Classic – men's challenger tournament
- Internazionali Femminili di Palermo – women's tournament
