= Diego Pérez (tennis) =

Uruguayan tennis player (born 1962)

- Country (sports): Uruguay
- Residence: Montevideo, Uruguay
- Born: February 9, 1962 (age 64) Montevideo, Uruguay
- Height: 1.78 m (5 ft 10 in)
- Turned pro: 1981
- Retired: 1995
- Plays: Right-handed (two-handed backhand)
- Prize money: $1,042,224

Singles
- Career record: 207-229 (47.5%)
- Career titles: 1
- Highest ranking: No. 27 (9 July 1984)

Grand Slam singles results
- Australian Open: 1R (1991, 1993)
- French Open: 4R (1992)
- Wimbledon: 1R (1990, 1993)
- US Open: 3R (1987)

Doubles
- Career record: 160-189
- Career titles: 3
- Highest ranking: No. 37 (3 August 1987)

Diego Pérez (Latin American Spanish: [ˈdjeɣo ˈpeɾes]; born 9 February 1962) is a retired professional tennis player from Uruguay. Pérez turned pro in 1981, and won one ATP Tour singles and three doubles titles in his career, which lasted until 1995. He has the most singles wins for the Uruguay Davis Cup team (31, shared with Marcelo Filippini).

== ATP career finals ==
Legend
Grand Slam
Tennis Masters Cup
ATP Masters Series
Grand Prix / ATP Tour

=== Singles: 2 (1 win / 1 loss) ===
Result	W/L	Date	Tournament	Surface	Opponent	Score
Loss	0–1	Feb 1985	Buenos Aires, Argentina	Clay	(Argentina) Martín Jaite	4–6, 2–6
Win	1–1	Sep 1985	Bordeaux, France	Clay	(United States) Jimmy Brown	6–4, 7–6

=== Doubles: 15 (3 wins / 12 losses) ===
Result	W/L	Date	Tournament	Surface	Partner	Opponents	Score
Win	1–0	Sep 1981	Palermo, Italy	Clay	(Uruguay) José Luis Damiani	(Chile) Jaime Fillol Sr. (Chile) Belus Prajoux	6–1, 6–4
Loss	1–1	Sep 1982	Palermo, Italy	Clay	(Uruguay) José Luis Damiani	(Italy) Gianni Marchetti (Italy) Enzo Vattuone	4–6, 7–6, 3–6
Loss	1–2	Mar 1985	Buenos Aires, Argentina	Clay	(Argentina) Eduardo Bengoechea	(Argentina) Martín Jaite (Argentina) Christian Miniussi	4–6, 3–6
Loss	1–3	Sep 1986	Stuttgart, West Germany	Clay	(Iran) Mansour Bahrami	(Chile) Hans Gildemeister (Ecuador) Andrés Gómez	4–6, 3–6
Loss	1–4	Nov 1986	Paris Indoor, France	Carpet	(Iran) Mansour Bahrami	(United States) Peter Fleming (United States) John McEnroe	3–6, 2–6
Loss	1–5	Sep 1987	Geneva, Switzerland	Clay	(Iran) Mansour Bahrami	(Brazil) Ricardo Acioly (Brazil) Luiz Mattar	6–3, 4–6, 2–6
Loss	1–6	Nov 1987	Itaparica, Brazil	Hard	(Mexico) Jorge Lozano	(Spain) Sergio Casal (Spain) Emilio Sánchez	2–6, 2–6
Loss	1–7	Feb 1988	Guarujá, Brazil	Hard	(Argentina) Javier Frana	(Chile) Ricardo Acuña (United States) Luke Jensen	1–6, 4–6
Loss	1–8	Sep 1988	Barcelona, Spain	Clay	(Switzerland) Claudio Mezzadri	(Spain) Sergio Casal (Spain) Emilio Sánchez	6–2, 4–6, 7–9
Loss	1–9	Sep 1989	Hilversum, Netherlands	Clay	(Spain) Tomás Carbonell	(Netherlands) Paul Haarhuis (Netherlands) Mark Koevermans	not played
Loss	1–10	Jun 1990	Florence, Italy	Clay	(Brazil) Luiz Mattar	(Spain) Sergi Bruguera (Argentina) Horacio de la Peña	6–3, 3–6, 4–6
Loss	1–11	Jul 1991	San Marino, San Marino	Clay	(Argentina) Christian Miniussi	(Spain) Jordi Arrese (Spain) Carlos Costa	3–6, 6–3, 3–6
Loss	1–12	Feb 1992	Guarujá, Brazil	Clay	(Spain) Francisco Roig	(Sweden) Christer Allgårdh (Australia) Carl Limberger	4–6, 3–6
Win	2–12	Nov 1992	São Paulo, Brazil	Clay	(Spain) Francisco Roig	(Sweden) Christer Allgårdh (Australia) Carl Limberger	6–2, 7–6
Win	3–12	Aug 1994	Umag, Croatia	Clay	(Spain) Francisco Roig	(Slovakia) Karol Kučera (Kenya) Paul Wekesa	6–2, 6–4
