= Mario Martínez (tennis) =

Bolivian tennis player

- Full name: Mario E. Martínez Guzmán
- Country (sports): Bolivia
- Born: 12 September 1961 (age 63); La Paz, Bolivia
- Height: 1.70 m (5 ft 7 in)
- Turned pro: 1980
- Retired: 1985
- Plays: Right-handed
- Prize money: $2,102

Singles
- Career record: 86–73
- Career titles: 3
- Highest ranking: No. 32 (27 October 1980)

Grand Slam singles results
- French Open: 3R (1983)
- US Open: 1R (1980, 1981, 1982)

Doubles
- Career record: 14–36
- Career titles: 0
- Highest ranking: No. 274 (3 January 1983)

Grand Slam doubles results
- French Open: 1R (1981)

Mario E. Martínez Guzmán (born 12 September 1961) is a former professional tennis player from Bolivia. Martínez achieved a career-high singles ranking of world No. 32 on 27 October 1980.

== Tennis career ==
He participated in three Davis Cup ties for Bolivia from 1977–1978 and one more in 1988, posting a 3–5 record in singles and an 0–2 record in doubles.

== Personal information ==
In 2013 he was accused of sexually assaulting his former tennis student when she was a teenager, according to an arrest report.

== Career finals ==
Legend (singles)
Grand Slam (0)
Tennis Masters Cup (0)
ATP Masters Series (0)
ATP Tour (3)
Challengers (2)

=== Singles (5 titles, 3 runner-ups) ===
Result	No.	Year	Tournament	Surface	Opponent	Score
Win	1.	1980	Bordeaux, France	Clay	(Italy) Gianni Ocleppo	6–0, 7–5, 7–5
Loss	1.	1980	Cuneo, Italy	Clay	(Argentina) Ricardo Cano	5–7, 2–6
Loss	2.	1981	Nice, France	Clay	(France) Yannick Noah	4–6, 2–6
Win	2.	1981	Venice, Italy	Clay	(Italy) Paolo Bertolucci	6–4, 6–4
Win	3.	1981	Messina, Italy	Clay	(South Africa) Robbie Venter	6–4, 7–5
Win	4.	1982	Palermo, Italy	Clay	(Australia) John Alexander	6–4, 7–5
Loss	3.	1982	Messina, Italy	Clay	(Peru) Pablo Arraya	5–7, 4–6
Win	5.	1983	Messina, Italy	Clay	(France) Patrice Kuchna	6–7, 6–0, 9–7
