= Gianni Ocleppo =

Italian tennis player

- Country (sports): Italy
- Residence: Monte Carlo, Monaco
- Born: 6 April 1957 (age 69) Alba, Italy
- Height: 1.83 m (6 ft 0 in)
- Plays: Right-handed
- Prize money: $325,570

Singles
- Career record: 102–127
- Career titles: 1
- Highest ranking: No. 30 (7 December 1979)

Grand Slam singles results
- French Open: 2R (1978, 1979, 1984)
- Wimbledon: 2R (1978, 1983, 1984)
- US Open: 3R (1978, 1980, 1983)

Doubles
- Career record: 69–101
- Career titles: 2
- Highest ranking: No. 53 (5 May 1987)

Grand Slam doubles results
- French Open: 3R (1978)
- Wimbledon: 1R (1984, 1987)
- US Open: 1R (1984)

Team competitions
- Davis Cup: F (1980)

Gianni Ocleppo (Italian pronunciation: [ˈdʒanni oˈkleppo]; born 6 April 1957) is a retired Italian tennis player.

He has two children: one of them, Julian Ocleppo (born 1997), is a professional tennis player, by former wife Dee Ocleppo.

== Career ==
Ocleppo won one ATP Tour singles title (Linz, 1981) and two doubles titles in his career. He played for Italy in the final of the 1980 Davis Cup, losing in a dead rubber to Ivan Lendl. Ocleppo reached a career-high singles ranking of world No. 30 in December 1979. His career-high doubles ranking is world No. 53, achieved in May 1987.

== Career finals ==
=== Singles: 4 (1 title / 3 runner-ups) ===
Result	W/L	Date	Tournament	Surface	Opponent	Score
Loss	0–1	Nov 1979	Bologna, Italy	Carpet (i)	(United States) Butch Walts	3–6, 2–6
Loss	0–2	Mar 1980	Metz, France	Carpet (i)	(United States) Gene Mayer	3–6, 3–6, 0–6
Loss	0–3	Sep 1980	Bordeaux, France	Carpet (i)	(Bolivia) Mario Martínez	0–6, 5–7, 5–7
Win	1–3	Mar 1981	Linz, Austria	Hard (i)	(Australia) Mark Edmondson	7–5, 6–1

=== Doubles: 7 (2 titles / 5 runner-ups) ===
Result	W/L	Date	Tournament	Surface	Partner	Opponents	Score
Win	1–0	Jun 1980	Vienna, Austria	Clay	(France) Christophe Roger-Vasselin	(Czechoslovakia) Pavel Složil (Czechoslovakia) Tomáš Šmíd	w/o
Win	2–0	Sep 1980	Sicily, Italy	Clay	(Ecuador) Ricardo Ycaza	(Paraguay) Víctor Pecci (Hungary) Balázs Taróczy	6–2, 6–2
Loss	2–1	Sep 1980	Bordeaux, France	Carpet (i)	(Ecuador) Ricardo Ycaza	(United Kingdom) John Feaver (France) Gilles Moretton	2–6, 3–6
Loss	2–2	Mar 1981	Cairo, Egypt	Clay	(Italy) Paolo Bertolucci	(Hungary) Balázs Taróczy (Egypt) Ismail El Shafei	7–6, 3–6, 1–6
Loss	2–3	Oct 1986	Palermo, Italy	Clay	(Switzerland) Claudio Mezzadri	(Italy) Paolo Canè (West Germany) Simone Colombo	5–7, 3–6
Loss	2–4	Apr 1987	Nice, France	Clay	(Switzerland) Claudio Mezzadri	(Spain) Sergio Casal (Spain) Emilio Sánchez	3–6, 3–6
Loss	2–5	May 1987	Florence, Italy	Clay	(Italy) Paolo Canè	(West Germany) Wolfgang Popp (West Germany) Udo Riglewski	4–6, 4–6
