= José Luis Damiani =

Uruguayan tennis player (born 1956)

- Country (sports): Uruguay
- Born: 21 November 1956 (age 69) Montevideo, Uruguay
- Height: 1.85 m (6 ft 1 in)
- Plays: Right-handed

Singles
- Career record: 50–64
- Career titles: 0
- Highest ranking: No. 32 (10 August 1981)

Grand Slam singles results
- French Open: 2R (1981)
- Wimbledon: 2R (1979)
- US Open: 1R (1979)

Doubles
- Career record: 53–60
- Career titles: 2
- Highest ranking: No. 44 (23 April 1982)

José Luis Damiani (born 21 November 1956) is a retired professional tennis player from Uruguay. He turned pro in 1977 and retired in 1983. Damiani won two ATP Tour doubles titles in his career, and reached career-high rankings of No. 32 in singles and No. 49 in doubles. He is the former captain of the Uruguay Davis Cup team.

== Career finals ==
=== Doubles (2 wins, 1 loss) ===
Result	W-L	Date	Tournament	Surface	Partner	Opponents	Score
Win	1–0	Sep 1981	Palermo, Italy	Clay	(Uruguay) Diego Pérez	(Chile) Jaime Fillol Sr. (Chile) Belus Prajoux	6–1, 6–4
Loss	1–1	Sep 1982	Palermo, Italy	Clay	(Uruguay) Diego Pérez	(Italy) Gianni Marchetti (Italy) Enzo Vattuone	4–6, 7–6, 3–6
Win	2–1	Oct 1982	Cologne, Germany	Hard	(Brazil) Carlos Kirmayr	(West Germany) Hans-Dieter Beutel (West Germany) Christoph Zipf	6–2, 3–6, 7–5
