= 1982 Bordeaux Open – Doubles =

Doubles
- 1982 Bordeaux Open

Final
- Champions: (Chile) Hans Gildemeister (Ecuador) Andrés Gómez
- Runners-up: (Sweden) Anders Järryd (Sweden) Hans Simonsson
- Score: 6–4, 6–2

Events
Singles	Doubles
← 1981 ·	ATP Bordeaux	· 1983 →

Andrés Gómez and Belus Prajoux were the defending champions, but Prajoux did not compete this year.

Gómez teamed up with Hans Gildemeister and successfully defended his title, by defeating Anders Järryd and Hans Simonsson 6–4, 6–2 in the final.

== Seeds ==
1. (Chile) Hans Gildemeister / (Ecuador) Andrés Gómez (champions)
2. (Sweden) Anders Järryd / (Sweden) Hans Simonsson (final)
3. (New Zealand) Chris Lewis / (New Zealand) Russell Simpson (quarterfinals)
4. (United Kingdom) Andrew Jarrett / (United Kingdom) Jonathan Smith (semifinals)

== Draw ==
=== Key ===
- Q = Qualifier
- WC = Wild card
- LL = Lucky loser
- Alt = Alternate
- SE = Special exempt
- PR = Protected ranking
- ITF = ITF entry
- JE = Junior exempt
- w/o = Walkover
- r = Retired
- d = Defaulted
- SR = Special ranking

=== Draw ===
First round
1	(Chile) H Gildemeister (Ecuador) A Gómez	6	6
(France) F Lacueille (France) B La Font	4	2
(Peru) P Arraya (Sweden) S Simonsson	7	3	6
(Spain) J Aguilera (Spain) F Luna	6	6	4
(Spain) J Avendaño (Zimbabwe) H Ismail	1	1
3	(New Zealand) C Lewis (New Zealand) R Simpson	6	6
(France) D Naegelen (France) J Potier	6	6
(Argentina) C Castellan (Spain) G Urpí	4	2
(Argentina) G Giussani (Mexico) G Stevens	6	6
(Argentina) F Yunis (Argentina) J Carlos Yunis	1	2
4	(United Kingdom) A Jarrett (United Kingdom) J Smith	6	6
(France) L Courteau (France) P Portes	2	3
(Iran) M Bahrami (France) C Lesage	7	7
(New Zealand) B Derlin (New Zealand) J Simpson	6	5
(Italy) C Barazzutti (France) H Leconte	3	4
2	(Sweden) A Järryd (Sweden) H Simonsson	6	6

Quarterfinals
1	(Chile) H Gildemeister (Ecuador) A Gómez	6	4	6
(Peru) P Arraya (Sweden) S Simonsson	4	6	1
3	(New Zealand) C Lewis (New Zealand) R Simpson	7	4	4
(France) D Naegelen (France) J Potier	6	6	6
(Argentina) G Giussani (Mexico) G Stevens	4	0
4	(United Kingdom) A Jarrett (United Kingdom) J Smith	6	6
(Iran) M Bahrami (France) C Lesage	7	2	3
2	(Sweden) A Järryd (Sweden) H Simonsson	6	6	6

Semifinals
1	(Chile) H Gildemeister (Ecuador) A Gómez	6	6
(France) D Naegelen (France) J Potier	0	3
4	(United Kingdom) A Jarrett (United Kingdom) J Smith	4	3
2	(Sweden) A Järryd (Sweden) H Simonsson	6	6

Final
1	(Chile) H Gildemeister (Ecuador) A Gómez	6	6
2	(Sweden) A Järryd (Sweden) H Simonsson	4	2
