= 1982 Bordeaux Open – Singles =

Singles
- 1982 Bordeaux Open

Final
- Champion: (Chile) Hans Gildemeister
- Runner-up: (Peru) Pablo Arraya
- Score: 7–5, 6–1

Details
- Draw: 32
- Seeds: 8

Events
Singles	Doubles
← 1981 ·	ATP Bordeaux	· 1983 →

Andrés Gómez was the defending champion, but lost in the quarterfinals to Diego Pérez.

Hans Gildemeister won the title by defeating Pablo Arraya 7–5, 6–1 in the final.

== Seeds ==
1. (Ecuador) Andrés Gómez (quarterfinals)
2. (New Zealand) Chris Lewis (semifinals)
3. (Peru) Pablo Arraya (final)
4. (Chile) Hans Gildemeister (champion)
5. (France) Henri Leconte (second round)
6. (Italy) Corrado Barazzutti (first round)
7. (France) Dominique Bedel (first round)
8. (Spain) Fernando Luna (quarterfinals)

== Draw ==
=== Key ===
- Q = Qualifier
- WC = Wild card
- LL = Lucky loser
- Alt = Alternate
- SE = Special exempt
- PR = Protected ranking
- ITF = ITF entry
- JE = Junior exempt
- w/o = Walkover
- r = Retired
- d = Defaulted
- SR = Special ranking

=== Finals ===
Semifinals
(Uruguay) Diego Pérez	6	2	3
4	(Chile) Hans Gildemeister	3	6	6
3	(Peru) Pablo Arraya	6	6
2	(New Zealand) Chris Lewis	4	4

Final
4	(Chile) Hans Gildemeister	7	6
3	(Peru) Pablo Arraya	5	1

=== Top half ===
First round
1	(Ecuador) A Gómez	6	6
(Sweden) S Simonsson	2	4
LL	(Spain) G Urpí	6	6
Q	(Spain) J Aguilera	2	3
(New Zealand) R Simpson	1	2
(Uruguay) D Pérez	6	6
(France) J Potier	2	4
5	(France) H Leconte	6	6
4	(Chile) H Gildemeister	6	7
LL	(France) P Kuchna	2	5
Q	(France) C Lesage	6	6
(Spain) J García Requena	3	3
(France) P Portes	4	2
(Spain) J Lopez-Maeso	6	6
(New Zealand) B Derlin	3	0
8	(Spain) F Luna	6	6

Second round
1	(Ecuador) A Gómez	6	6
LL	(Spain) G Urpí	3	4
(Uruguay) D Pérez	6	7
5	(France) H Leconte	3	5
4	(Chile) H Gildemeister	6	6
Q	(France) C Lesage	0	3
(Spain) J Lopez-Maeso	2	6
8	(Spain) F Luna	6	7

Quarterfinals
1	(Ecuador) A Gómez	3	4
(Uruguay) D Pérez	6	6
4	(Chile) H Gildemeister	6	6
8	(Spain) F Luna	1	4

Semifinals
(Uruguay) D Pérez	6	2	3
4	(Chile) H Gildemeister	3	6	6

=== Bottom half ===
First round
6	(Italy) C Barazzutti	4	4
(France) C Roger-Vasselin	6	6
(New Zealand) J Simpson	6	3
(France) L Courteau	7	6
(Argentina) C Castellan	4	6	6
(United States) P Murphy	6	1	4
(Spain) J Avendaño	4	4
3	(Peru) P Arraya	6	6
7	(France) D Bedel	1	4
(Bolivia) M Martinez	6	6
(Argentina) J Carlos Yunis	2	3
(Sweden) H Simonsson	6	6
(Sweden) A Järryd	6	6
Q	(Mexico) G Stevens	3	2
Q	(Iran) M Bahrami	7	4	2
2	(New Zealand) C Lewis	6	6	6

Second round
(France) C Roger-Vasselin	5	2
(France) L Courteau	7	6
(Argentina) C Castellan	6	0	4
3	(Peru) P Arraya	4	6	6
(Bolivia) M Martinez	6	4
(Sweden) H Simonsson	7	6
(Sweden) A Järryd	2	1
2	(New Zealand) C Lewis	6	6

Quarterfinals
(France) L Courteau	4	3
3	(Peru) P Arraya	6	6
(Sweden) H Simonsson	4	7	5
2	(New Zealand) C Lewis	6	5	7

Semifinals
3	(Peru) P Arraya	6	6
2	(New Zealand) C Lewis	4	4
