= 1983 Bordeaux Open =

- Date: 19–23 September
- Edition: 5th
- Category: Grand Prix
- Draw: 32S / 16D
- Prize money: $75,000
- Surface: Clay / outdoor
- Location: Bordeaux, France
- Venue: Villa Primrose

Champions

Singles
- (Peru) Pablo Arraya

Doubles
- (Sweden) Stefan Simonsson (Sweden) Magnus Tideman
← 1982 ·	Bordeaux Open	· 1984 →

The 1983 Bordeaux Open also known as the Grand Prix Passing Shot was a men's tennis tournament played on outdoor clay courts at Villa Primrose in Bordeaux, France that was part of the 1983 Volvo Grand Prix. It was the fifth edition of the tournament and took place from 19 September until 23 September 1983. Fourth-seeded Pablo Arraya won the singles title.

== Finals ==
=== Singles ===
(Peru) Pablo Arraya defeated (Spain) Juan Aguilera 7–5, 7–5

- It was Arraya's only singles title of his career.

=== Doubles ===
(Sweden) Stefan Simonsson / (Sweden) Magnus Tideman defeated (Argentina) Francisco Yunis / (Argentina) Juan Carlos Yunis 6–4, 6–2
