= 1983 Bordeaux Open – Singles =

Singles
- 1983 Bordeaux Open

Final
- Champion: (Peru) Pablo Arraya
- Runner-up: (Spain) Juan Aguilera
- Score: 7–5, 7–5

Details
- Draw: 32 (3Q)
- Seeds: 8

Events
Singles	Doubles
← 1982 ·	ATP Bordeaux	· 1984 →

Hans Gildemeister was the defending champion, but did not compete this year.

Pablo Arraya won the title by defeating Juan Aguilera 7–5, 7–5 in the final.

== Seeds ==
1. (Bolivia) Mario Martínez (first round)
2. (Uruguay) Diego Pérez (quarterfinals)
3. (Italy) Corrado Barazzutti (first round)
4. (Peru) Pablo Arraya (champion)
5. (Belgium) Bernard Boileau (first round)
6. (Spain) Fernando Luna (semifinals)
7. (Argentina) Roberto Argüello (quarterfinals)
8. (Sweden) Stefan Simonsson (quarterfinals)

== Draw ==
=== Key ===
- Q = Qualifier
- WC = Wild card
- LL = Lucky loser
- Alt = Alternate
- SE = Special exempt
- PR = Protected ranking
- ITF = ITF entry
- JE = Junior exempt
- w/o = Walkover
- r = Retired
- d = Defaulted
- SR = Special ranking

=== Finals ===
Semifinals
(Czechoslovakia) Miloslav Mečíř	4	6	6
4	(Peru) Pablo Arraya	6	1	8
(Spain) Juan Aguilera	6	6
6	(Spain) Fernando Luna	4	2

Final
4	(Peru) Pablo Arraya	7	7
(Spain) Juan Aguilera	5	5

=== Top half ===
First round
1	(Bolivia) M Martínez	3	1
(Argentina) M Jaite	6	6
(France) B Fritz	6	6	6
(United States) S Lipton	7	3	3
(France) L Courteau	6	0	2
(Czechoslovakia) M Mečíř	2	6	6
(United States) E Iskersky	6	6
5	(Belgium) B Boileau	1	3
4	(Peru) P Arraya	6	6
(France) P Kuchna	3	2
(Czechoslovakia) J Navrátil	2	4
(France) P Portes	6	6
(Paraguay) V Pecci	3	2
(France) T Tulasne	6	6
(Argentina) C Castellan	4	0
7	(Argentina) R Argüello	6	6

Second round
(Argentina) M Jaite	6	7
(France) B Fritz	4	6
(Czechoslovakia) M Mečíř	3	7	6
(United States) E Iskersky	6	5	3
4	(Peru) P Arraya	6	6	6
(France) P Portes	7	3	1
(France) T Tulasne	6	3	1
7	(Argentina) R Argüello	4	6	6

Quarterfinals
(Argentina) M Jaite	6	2	8
(Czechoslovakia) M Mečíř	3	6	10
4	(Peru) P Arraya	7	6
7	(Argentina) R Argüello	6	3

Semifinals
(Czechoslovakia) M Mečíř	4	6	6
4	(Peru) P Arraya	6	1	8

=== Bottom half ===
First round
8	(Sweden) S Simonsson	6	7
(Netherlands) M Schapers	1	5
Q	(France) Gregoire Rafaitin	2	3
(Sweden) M Tideman	6	6
(France) T Benhabiles	1	4
(France) J Vanier	6	6
(Spain) J Aguilera	6	6
3	(Italy) C Barazzutti	4	4
6	(Spain) F Luna	6	6
(France) G Goven	1	1
(Sweden) J Gunnarsson	6	6
Q	(France) Nicholas Sido	4	1
(United Kingdom) C Dowdeswell	7	4	6
(United States) P Murphy	5	6	3
Q	(Argentina) A Ganzábal	1	4
2	(Uruguay) D Pérez	6	6

Second round
8	(Sweden) S Simonsson	7	6
(Sweden) M Tideman	5	1
(France) J Vanier	4	1
(Spain) J Aguilera	6	6
6	(Spain) F Luna	6	6
(Sweden) J Gunnarsson	3	3
(United Kingdom) C Dowdeswell	4	6	1
2	(Uruguay) D Pérez	6	3	6

Quarterfinals
8	(Sweden) S Simonsson	3	4
(Spain) J Aguilera	6	6
6	(Spain) F Luna	6	6
2	(Uruguay) D Pérez	2	0

Semifinals
(Spain) J Aguilera	6	6
6	(Spain) F Luna	4	2
