= 1983 Bordeaux Open – Doubles =

Doubles
- 1983 Bordeaux Open

Final
- Champions: (Sweden) Stefan Simonsson (Sweden) Magnus Tideman
- Runners-up: (Argentina) Francisco Yunis (Argentina) Juan Carlos Yunis
- Score: 6–4, 6–2

Events
Singles	Doubles
← 1982 ·	ATP Bordeaux	· 1984 →

Hans Gildemeister and Andrés Gómez were the defending champions, but none competed this year.

Stefan Simonsson and Magnus Tideman won the title by defeating Francisco Yunis and Juan Carlos Yunis 6–4, 6–2 in the final.

== Seeds ==
1. (Peru) Pablo Arraya / (Paraguay) Víctor Pecci (quarterfinals)
2. (Sweden) Stefan Simonsson / (Sweden) Magnus Tideman (champions)
3. (United States) Erick Iskersky / (United Kingdom) Richard Lewis (first round)
4. (Argentina) Carlos Castellan / (Argentina) Martín Jaite (semifinals)

== Draw ==
=== Key ===
- Q = Qualifier
- WC = Wild card
- LL = Lucky loser
- Alt = Alternate
- SE = Special exempt
- PR = Protected ranking
- ITF = ITF entry
- JE = Junior exempt
- w/o = Walkover
- r = Retired
- d = Defaulted
- SR = Special ranking

=== Draw ===
First round
1	(Peru) P Arraya (Paraguay) V Pecci	7	7
(France) J Hervet (France) J Vanier	5	5
(Argentina) F Yunis (Argentina) JC Yunis	6	4	6
(Iran) M Bahrami (France) P Kuchna	4	6	4
4	(Argentina) C Castellan (Argentina) M Jaite	7	6	6
(France) G Goven (France) T Pham	5	7	4
(France) L Courteau (France) P Portes	6	6
(France) D Naegelen (France) T Tulasne	3	1
(Argentina) A Ganzábal (Argentina) G Tiberti	6	4	6
(Spain) J Arrese (Spain) JC Báguena	0	6	4
(France) T Benhabiles (France) JM Piacentile	2	6	6
3	(United States) E Iskersky (United Kingdom) R Lewis	6	4	2
(United States) S Lipton (United States) P Murphy	1	6	6
(France) Xavier Lemoine (France) Marc Poutignat	6	4	4
(Spain) J Aguilera (Spain) F Luna	7	6	2
2	(Sweden) S Simonsson (Sweden) M Tideman	5	7	6

Quarterfinals
1	(Peru) P Arraya (Paraguay) V Pecci	1	6	2
(Argentina) F Yunis (Argentina) JC Yunis	6	1	6
4	(Argentina) C Castellan (Argentina) M Jaite	6	3	6
(France) L Courteau (France) P Portes	3	6	4
(Argentina) A Ganzábal (Argentina) G Tiberti	6	6
(France) T Benhabiles (France) JM Piacentile	3	2
(United States) S Lipton (United States) P Murphy	6	7	3
2	(Sweden) S Simonsson (Sweden) M Tideman	7	5	6

Semifinals
(Argentina) F Yunis (Argentina) JC Yunis	6	6
4	(Argentina) C Castellan (Argentina) M Jaite	2	3
(Argentina) A Ganzábal (Argentina) G Tiberti	7	3	2
2	(Sweden) S Simonsson (Sweden) M Tideman	5	6	6

Final
(Argentina) F Yunis (Argentina) JC Yunis	4	2
2	(Sweden) S Simonsson (Sweden) M Tideman	6	6
