= 1983 Grand Prix de Tennis de Toulouse – Singles =

Singles
- 1983 Grand Prix de Tennis de Toulouse

Final
- Champion: (Switzerland) Heinz Günthardt
- Runner-up: (Peru) Pablo Arraya
- Score: 6–0, 6–2

Details
- Draw: 32
- Seeds: 8

Events
Singles	Doubles
← 1982 ·	Grand Prix de Tennis de Toulouse	· 1984 →

The 1983 Grand Prix de Tennis de Toulouse was a men's tennis tournament played on indoor carpet courts in Toulouse, France that was part of the Grand Prix series of the 1983 Grand Prix tennis circuit. It was the second edition of the tournament and was held from 21 November – 27 November.

== Seeds ==
Champion seeds are indicated in bold text while text in italics indicates the round in which those seeds were eliminated.

1. (Switzerland) **Heinz Günthardt (champion)**
2. (Italy) Gianni Ocleppo (second round)
3. (United States) Jimmy Brown (semifinals)
4. (Peru) Pablo Arraya (final)
5. (Italy) Corrado Barazzutti (second round)
6. (Sweden) Stefan Simonsson (second round)
7. (Czechoslovakia) Libor Pimek (second round)
8. (Uruguay) Diego Pérez (semifinals)

== Draw ==
=== Key ===
- Q = Qualifier
- WC = Wild card
- LL = Lucky loser
- Alt = Alternate
- SE = Special exempt
- PR = Protected ranking
- ITF = ITF entry
- JE = Junior exempt
- w/o = Walkover
- r = Retired
- d = Defaulted
- SR = Special ranking

=== Finals ===
Semifinals
1	**(Switzerland) Heinz Günthardt**	**6**	**6**
3	(United States) Jimmy Brown	3	1
4	**(Peru) Pablo Arraya**	6	**6**	**6**
8	(Uruguay) Diego Pérez	**7**	3	2

Final
1	**(Switzerland) Heinz Günthardt**	**6**	**6**
4	(Peru) Pablo Arraya	0	2

=== Top half ===
First round
1	**(Switzerland) Heinz Günthardt**	3	**6**	**6**
(Sweden) Thomas Högstedt	**6**	4	2
**(United States) Nick Saviano**	**6**	**7**
(France) Bruno Dadillon	0	5
**(West Germany) Jaromir Becka**	**7**	**6**
(France) Christophe Casa	6	2
6	**(Sweden) Stefan Simonsson**	**6**	**6**
(West Germany) Christoph Zipf	3	1
3	**(United States) Jimmy Brown**	**6**	**6**
(United States) Vincent Van Patten	2	3
**(United States) Sean Brawley**	**7**	5
(France) Dominique Bedel	6	4^{r}
**(France) Pascal Portes**	**6**	**6**
(France) Christophe Lesage	0	3
7	**(Czechoslovakia) Libor Pimek**	**6**	1	**6**
(Czechoslovakia) Pavel Složil	2	**6**	4

Second round
1	**(Switzerland) H Günthardt**	4	**6**	**6**
(United States) N Saviano	**6**	4	2
**(West Germany) J Becka**	4	**6**	**8**
6	(Sweden) S Simonsson	**6**	4	6
3	**(United States) J Brown**	**6**	**6**
(United States) S Brawley	1	3
**(France) P Portes**	3	**6**	**7**
7	(Czechoslovakia) L Pimek	**6**	3	5

Quarterfinals
1	**(Switzerland) H Günthardt**	**6**	**6**
(West Germany) J Becka	4	0
3	**(United States) J Brown**	**6**	**6**
(France) P Portes	1	4

Semifinals
1	**(Switzerland) H Günthardt**	**6**	**6**
3	(United States) J Brown	3	1

=== Bottom half ===
First round
5	**(Italy) Corrado Barazzutti**	**6**	3	**6**
(France) Thierry Tulasne	4	**6**	4
**(Netherlands) Michiel Schapers**	**6**	**6**
(West Germany) Peter Elter	3	1
**(Sweden) Jan Gunnarsson**	**6**	**6**
(France) Georges Goven	1	4
4	**(Peru) Pablo Arraya**	4	**6**	**6**
(Czechoslovakia) Stanislav Birner	**6**	3	3
8	**(Uruguay) Diego Pérez**	5
(South Africa) Bernie Mitton	2^{r}
**(France) Bernard Fritz**	**6**	**6**
(France) Jean-Louis Haillet	0	4
**(Iran) Mansour Bahrami**	**6**	5	**6**
(France) Guy Forget	3	**7**	2
2	**(Italy) Gianni Ocleppo**	**6**	**7**
(United States) Butch Walts	3	5

Second round
5	(Italy) C Barazzutti	4	**7**	4
**(Netherlands) M Schapers**	**6**	6	**6**
(Sweden) J Gunnarsson	2	4
4	**(Peru) P Arraya**	**6**	**6**
8	**(Uruguay) D Pérez**	4
(France) B Fritz	2	R
**(Iran) M Bahrami**	**6**	3	**7**
2	(Italy) G Ocleppo	3	**6**	5

Quarterfinals
(Netherlands) M Schapers	**6**	3	2
4	**(Peru) P Arraya**	4	**6**	**6**
8	**(Uruguay) D Pérez**	**6**	**6**
(Iran) M Bahrami	3	3

Semifinals
4	**(Peru) P Arraya**	6	**6**	**6**
8	(Uruguay) D Pérez	**7**	3	2
