= 1984 Swedish Open – Singles =

Singles
- 1984 Swedish Open

Final
- Champion: (Sweden) Henrik Sundström
- Runner-up: (Sweden) Anders Järryd
- Score: 3–6, 7–5, 6–3

Details
- Draw: 32 (4Q)
- Seeds: 8

Events
Singles	Doubles
← 1983 ·	Swedish Open	· 1985 →

Mats Wilander was the defending champions, but did not compete this year.

Henrik Sundström won the title by defeating Anders Järryd 3–6, 7–5, 6–3 in the final.

== Seeds ==
1. (Sweden) Anders Järryd (final)
2. (Sweden) Henrik Sundström (champion)
3. (Sweden) Stefan Edberg (semifinals, withdrew)
4. (Sweden) Joakim Nyström (semifinals)
5. (Sweden) Jan Gunnarsson (quarterfinals)
6. (Sweden) Thomas Högstedt (first round)
7. (Sweden) Stefan Simonsson (first round)
8. (Belgium) Bernard Boileau (first round)

== Draw ==
=== Key ===
- Q = Qualifier
- WC = Wild card
- LL = Lucky loser
- Alt = Alternate
- ITF = ITF entry
- PR = Protected ranking
- SR = Special ranking
- SE = Special exempt
- JE = Junior exempt
- JR = Junior Accelerator Programme entrant
- CO = College Accelerator Programme entrant
- NG = Next Gen Accelerator Program entrant
- w/o = Walkover
- r = Retired
- d = Defaulted

=== Finals ===
Semifinals
1	(Sweden) Anders Järryd	w/o
3	(Sweden) Stefan Edberg
4	(Sweden) Joakim Nyström	4	3
2	(Sweden) Henrik Sundström	6	6

Final
1	(Sweden) Anders Järryd	6	5	3
2	(Sweden) Henrik Sundström	3	7	6

=== Top half ===
First round
1	(Sweden) A Järryd	6	6
(West Germany) C Zipf	0	1
Q	(Spain) J López-Maeso	6	4
Q	(Sweden) J Svensson	7	6
Q	(Sweden) M Tideman	3	6	6
(Sweden) J Carlsson	6	1	3
(West Germany) E Jelen	1	5
5	(Sweden) J Gunnarsson	6	7
3	(Sweden) S Edberg	7	6
(Argentina) M Jaite	6	1
(Italy) F Rocchi	6	6	4
(Switzerland) C Mezzadri	7	1	6
(Spain) J Avendaño	3	4
(West Germany) HD Beutel	6	6
(Argentina) H de la Peña	6	6	7
7	(Sweden) S Simonsson	3	7	6

Second round
1	(Sweden) A Järryd	6	6
Q	(Sweden) J Svensson	3	0
Q	(Sweden) M Tideman	4	4
5	(Sweden) J Gunnarsson	6	6
3	(Sweden) S Edberg	6	6
(Switzerland) C Mezzadri	2	4
(West Germany) HD Beutel	0	7	6
(Argentina) H de la Peña	6	5	2

Quarterfinals
1	(Sweden) A Järryd	6	6
5	(Sweden) J Gunnarsson	4	2
3	(Sweden) S Edberg	6	7
(West Germany) HD Beutel	2	6

Semifinals
1	(Sweden) A Järryd	w/o
3	(Sweden) S Edberg

=== Bottom half ===
First round
6	(Sweden) T Hogstedt	6	3	4
(Netherlands) M Schapers	4	6	6
(Ecuador) R Viver	7	6
Q	(Sweden) M Pernfors	6	2
(Paraguay) V Pecci	6	6
(Sweden) K Carlsson	3	1
(Sweden) P Carlsson	1	0
4	(Sweden) J Nyström	6	6
8	(Belgium) B Boileau	3	6
(Argentina) C Castellan	6	7
(Czechoslovakia) J Navrátil	6	6
(United States) J Gurfein	2	4
(France) P Kuchna	6	7
(Australia) P Doohan	3	5
(Sweden) H Simonsson	3	2
2	(Sweden) H Sundström	6	6

Second round
(Netherlands) M Schapers	6	7
(Ecuador) R Viver	1	5
(Paraguay) V Pecci	2	6	2
4	(Sweden) J Nyström	6	3	6
(Argentina) C Castellan	1	7	4
(Czechoslovakia) J Navrátil	6	5	6
(France) P Kuchna	1	1
2	(Sweden) H Sundström	6	6

Quarterfinals
(Netherlands) M Schapers	6	2	1
4	(Sweden) J Nyström	0	6	6
(Czechoslovakia) J Navrátil	3	4
2	(Sweden) H Sundström	6	6

Semifinals
4	(Sweden) J Nyström	4	3
2	(Sweden) H Sundström	6	6
