= 1987 Mercedes Cup – Doubles =

Doubles
- 1987 Mercedes Cup

Final
- Champions: (United States) Rick Leach (United States) Tim Pawsat
- Runners-up: (Sweden) Mikael Pernfors (Sweden) Magnus Tideman
- Score: 6–3, 6–4

Details
- Draw: 24
- Seeds: 8

Events
Singles	Doubles
- Stuttgart Open

Hans Gildemeister and Andrés Gómez were the defending champions, but none competed this year.

Rick Leach and Tim Pawsat won the title by defeating Mikael Pernfors and Magnus Tideman 6–3, 6–4 in the final.

== Seeds ==
All seeds received a bye into the second round.

1. (Czechoslovakia) Miloslav Mečíř / (Czechoslovakia) Tomáš Šmíd (semifinals)
2. (Iran) Mansour Bahrami / (Czechoslovakia) Jaroslav Navrátil (second round)
3. (Poland) Wojciech Fibak / (Socialist Federal Republic of Yugoslavia) Slobodan Živojinović (quarterfinals)
4. (Switzerland) Jakob Hlasek / (Switzerland) Claudio Mezzadri (quarterfinals)
5. (United States) Rick Leach / (United States) Tim Pawsat (champions)
6. (Sweden) Jan Gunnarsson / (Denmark) Michael Mortensen (semifinals)
7. (United States) Lloyd Bourne / (United States) Jeff Klaparda (quarterfinals)
8. (Spain) José López-Maeso / (Argentina) Gustavo Luza (second round)

== Draw ==
Key

- Q = Qualifier
- WC = Wild card
- LL = Lucky loser
- Alt = Alternate
- ITF = ITF entry
- PR = Protected ranking
- SR = Special ranking
- SE = Special exempt
- JE = Junior exempt
- JR = Junior Accelerator Programme entrant
- CO = College Accelerator Programme entrant
- NG = Next Gen Accelerator Program entrant
- w/o = Walkover
- r = Retired
- d = Defaulted

=== Finals ===
Semifinals
1	(Czechoslovakia) Miloslav Mečíř (Czechoslovakia) Tomáš Šmíd	6	3
5	(United States) Rick Leach (United States) Tim Pawsat	7	6
6	(Sweden) Jan Gunnarsson (Denmark) Michael Mortensen	4	6	1
(Sweden) Mikael Pernfors (Sweden) Magnus Tideman	6	3	6

Final
5	(United States) Rick Leach (United States) Tim Pawsat	6	6
(Sweden) Mikael Pernfors (Sweden) Magnus Tideman	3	4

=== Top half ===
First round
(Netherlands) M Schapers (Czechoslovakia) M Šrejber	6	6
(New Zealand) K Evernden (Sweden) P Lundgren	4	3
(Australia) R Barlow (West Germany) H Rittersbacher	6	1	5
(United States) B Gilbert (Switzerland) H Günthardt	1	6	7
(India) R Krishnan (United States) T Nelson	6	6	6
(France) G Forget (France) H Leconte	3	7	7
(West Germany) A Maurer (Sweden) U Stenlund	2	3
WC	(India) A Amritraj (Czechoslovakia) K Nováček	6	6

Second round
1	(Czechoslovakia) M Mečíř (Czechoslovakia) T Šmíd	3	6	6
(Netherlands) M Schapers (Czechoslovakia) M Šrejber	6	2	1
(United States) B Gilbert (Switzerland) H Günthardt	7	6
8	(Spain) J López-Maeso (Argentina) G Luza	5	4
3	(Poland) W Fibak (Socialist Federal Republic of Yugoslavia) S Živojinović	4	6	6
(France) G Forget (France) H Leconte	6	3	4
WC	(India) A Amritraj (Czechoslovakia) K Nováček	7	1	2
5	(United States) R Leach (United States) T Pawsat	6	6	6

Quarterfinals
1	(Czechoslovakia) M Mečíř (Czechoslovakia) T Šmíd	6	6
(United States) B Gilbert (Switzerland) H Günthardt	1	4
3	(Poland) W Fibak (Socialist Federal Republic of Yugoslavia) S Živojinović	4	6
5	(United States) R Leach (United States) T Pawsat	6	7

Semifinals
1	(Czechoslovakia) M Mečíř (Czechoslovakia) T Šmíd	6	3
5	(United States) R Leach (United States) T Pawsat	7	6

=== Bottom half ===
First round
(Sweden) R Båthman (Sweden) S Simonsson	7	5	7
(Australia) B Dyke (Australia) C Limberger	5	7	6
WC	(West Germany) J Becka (West Germany) P Vojtisek	6	7
(Brazil) C Kist (West Germany) W Popp	4	6
(West Germany) U Riglewski (West Germany) CU Steeb	3	6
(Australia) P McNamara (Australia) P McNamee	6	7
(West Germany) Martin Hipp (India) S Vasudevan	4	2
(Sweden) M Pernfors (Sweden) M Tideman	6	6

Second round
6	(Sweden) J Gunnarsson (Denmark) M Mortensen	6	6
(Sweden) R Båthman (Sweden) S Simonsson	1	4
WC	(West Germany) J Becka (West Germany) P Vojtisek	4	3
4	(Switzerland) J Hlasek (Switzerland) C Mezzadri	6	6
7	(United States) L Bourne (United States) J Klaparda	6	6
(Australia) P McNamara (Australia) P McNamee	4	4
(Sweden) M Pernfors (Sweden) M Tideman	7	6
2	(Iran) M Bahrami (Czechoslovakia) J Navrátil	6	3

Quarterfinals
6	(Sweden) J Gunnarsson (Denmark) M Mortensen	6	6	6
4	(Switzerland) J Hlasek (Switzerland) C Mezzadri	7	2	2
7	(United States) L Bourne (United States) J Klaparda	4	2
(Sweden) M Pernfors (Sweden) M Tideman	6	6

Semifinals
6	(Sweden) J Gunnarsson (Denmark) M Mortensen	4	6	1
(Sweden) M Pernfors (Sweden) M Tideman	6	3	6
