= 1984 Swedish Open – Doubles =

Doubles
- 1984 Swedish Open

Final
- Champions: (Sweden) Jan Gunnarsson (Denmark) Michael Mortensen
- Runners-up: (Spain) Juan Avendaño (Brazil) Fernando Roese
- Score: 6–0, 6–0

Events
Singles	Doubles
← 1983 ·	Swedish Open	· 1985 →

Joakim Nyström and Mats Wilander were the defending champions, but Wilander did not compete this year. Nyström teamed up with Henrik Sundström and lost in the semifinals to Jan Gunnarsson and Michael Mortensen.

Gunnarsson and Mortensen won the title by defeating Juan Avendaño and Fernando Roese 6–0, 6–0 in the final.

== Seeds ==
1. (Sweden) Stefan Edberg / (Sweden) Anders Järryd (semifinals, withdrew)
2. (Sweden) Jan Gunnarsson / (Denmark) Michael Mortensen (champions)
3. (Sweden) Hans Simonsson / (Sweden) Stefan Simonsson (quarterfinals)
4. (Sweden) Joakim Nyström / (Sweden) Henrik Sundström (semifinals)

== Draw ==
=== Key ===
- Q = Qualifier
- WC = Wild card
- LL = Lucky loser
- Alt = Alternate
- ITF = ITF entry
- PR = Protected ranking
- SR = Special ranking
- SE = Special exempt
- JE = Junior exempt
- JR = Junior Accelerator Programme entrant
- CO = College Accelerator Programme entrant
- NG = Next Gen Accelerator Program entrant
- w/o = Walkover
- r = Retired
- d = Defaulted

=== Draw ===
First round
1	(Sweden) S Edberg (Sweden) A Järryd	6	6
(Sweden) P Carlsson (Sweden) J Svensson	3	0
(Denmark) P Bastiansen (Sweden) M Tideman	7	6	2
(Czechoslovakia) J Navrátil (Netherlands) M Schapers	5	7	6
3	(Sweden) H Simonsson (Sweden) S Simonsson	6	6
(United States) R Evett (United States) A Scheinman	0	0
(Spain) J Avendaño (Brazil) F Roese	6	7
(Spain) J López-Maeso (West Germany) H Theissen	4	6
(Sweden) J Carlsson (Sweden) P Svensson	6	7
(Sweden) P Hjertquist (Ecuador) R Viver	4	6
(Brazil) C Chabalgoity (Brazil) T Koch	7	2	3
4	(Sweden) J Nyström (Sweden) H Sundström	6	6	6
(Brazil) C Kist (Brazil) E Oliveira	4	4
(Sweden) R Båthman (Sweden) S Svensson	6	6
(United States) J Gurfein (Australia) J McCurdy	4	2
2	(Sweden) J Gunnarsson (Denmark) M Mortensen	6	6

Quarterfinals
1	(Sweden) S Edberg (Sweden) A Järryd	6	6
(Czechoslovakia) J Navrátil (Netherlands) M Schapers	4	4
3	(Sweden) H Simonsson (Sweden) S Simonsson	4	6	3
(Spain) J Avendaño (Brazil) F Roese	6	4	6
(Sweden) J Carlsson (Sweden) P Svensson	6	1
4	(Sweden) J Nyström (Sweden) H Sundström	7	6
(Sweden) R Båthman (Sweden) S Svensson	3	4
2	(Sweden) J Gunnarsson (Denmark) M Mortensen	6	6

Semifinals
1	(Sweden) S Edberg (Sweden) A Järryd
(Spain) J Avendaño (Brazil) F Roese	w/o
4	(Sweden) J Nyström (Sweden) H Sundström	4	1
2	(Sweden) J Gunnarsson (Denmark) M Mortensen	6	6

Final
(Spain) J Avendaño (Brazil) F Roese	0	0
2	(Sweden) J Gunnarsson (Denmark) M Mortensen	6	6
