= 1983 Grand Prix de Tennis de Toulouse – Doubles =

Doubles
- 1983 Grand Prix de Tennis de Toulouse

Final
- Champions: (Switzerland) Heinz Günthardt (Czechoslovakia) Pavel Složil
- Runners-up: (South Africa) Bernard Mitton (United States) Butch Walts
- Score: 5–7, 7–5, 6–4

Events
Singles	Doubles
← 1982 ·	Grand Prix de Tennis de Toulouse	· 1984 →

The 1983 Grand Prix de Tennis de Toulouse was a men's tennis tournament played on indoor carpet in Toulouse, France that was part of the Grand Prix series of the 1983 Grand Prix tennis circuit. It was the second edition of the tournament and was held from 21 November – 27 November.

== Seeds ==
Champion seeds are indicated in bold text while text in italics indicates the round in which those seeds were eliminated.

1. (Switzerland) **Heinz Günthardt** / (Czechoslovakia) **Pavel Složil (champions)**
2. (South Africa) Bernard Mitton / (United States) Butch Walts (final)
3. (Sweden) Jan Gunnarsson / (Sweden) Stefan Simonsson (semifinals)
4. (Czechoslovakia) Stanislav Birner / (United States) Nick Saviano (semifinals)

== Draw ==
=== Key ===
- Q = Qualifier
- WC = Wild card
- LL = Lucky loser
- Alt = Alternate
- SE = Special exempt
- PR = Protected ranking
- ITF = ITF entry
- JE = Junior exempt
- w/o = Walkover
- r = Retired
- d = Defaulted
- SR = Special ranking

=== Finals ===
First round
1	(Switzerland) **Heinz Günthardt** **(Czechoslovakia) Pavel Složil**	**6**	**7**
(Iran) Mansour Bahrami (France) Jean-Louis Haillet	4	6
(France) **Guy Forget** **(France) Bernard Fritz**	**6**	**6**
(Argentina) Martin Montecof (Peru) Carlos Proano	3	3
3	(Sweden) **Jan Gunnarsson** **(Sweden) Stefan Simonsson**	**6**	**6**
(France) Roberto Bloise (France) Bernard Frances	3	4
(United States) **Sean Brawley** **(United States) Richard Meyer**	**6**	**6**
(France) Yannick Hesse (Mexico) Guillermo Stevens	2	4
(Socialist Federal Republic of Yugoslavia) **Robert Flego** **(Netherlands) Michiel Schapers**	4	**7**	**6**
(France) Georges Goven (France) Thierry Tulasne	**6**	6	2
4	(Czechoslovakia) **Stanislav Birner** **(United States) Nick Saviano**	**6**	**6**
(Spain) Ricardo Sanchez-Rueda (France) Paul Torre	1	3
(France) **Dominique Bedel** **(France) Pascal Portes**	**6**	**6**
(France) Fabien Boudet (France) Christophe Lesage	3	4
2	(South Africa) **Bernard Mitton** **(United States) Butch Walts**	**6**	**6**
(France) François Bert (France) Nicholas Sido	2	2

Quarterfinals
1	(Switzerland) **H Günthardt** **(Czechoslovakia) P Složil**	w/o
(France) G Forget (France) B Fritz
3	(Sweden) **J Gunnarsson** **(Sweden) S Simonsson**	1	**6**	**6**
(United States) S Brawley (United States) R Meyer	**6**	3	4
(Socialist Federal Republic of Yugoslavia) R Flego (Netherlands) M Schapers	3	4
4	(Czechoslovakia) **S Birner** **(United States) N Saviano**	**6**	**6**
(France) D Bedel (France) P Portes	3	5
2	(South Africa) **B Mitton** **(United States) B Walts**	**6**	**7**

Semifinals
1	(Switzerland) **H Günthardt** **(Czechoslovakia) P Složil**	**6**	**6**
3	(Sweden) J Gunnarsson (Sweden) S Simonsson	1	4
4	(Czechoslovakia) S Birner (United States) N Saviano	3	6
2	(South Africa) **B Mitton** **(United States) B Walts**	**6**	**7**

Final
1	(Switzerland) **H Günthardt** **(Czechoslovakia) P Složil**	5	**7**	**6**
2	(South Africa) B Mitton (United States) B Walts	**7**	5	4
