= 1982 Grand Prix de Tennis de Toulouse – Doubles =

Doubles
- 1982 Grand Prix de Tennis de Toulouse

Final
- Champions: (Czechoslovakia) Pavel Složil (Czechoslovakia) Tomáš Šmíd
- Runners-up: (France) Jean-Louis Haillet (France) Yannick Noah
- Score: 6–4, 6–4

Details
- Draw: 16
- Seeds: 4

Events
Singles	Doubles
- Grand Prix de Tennis de Toulouse

The 1982 Grand Prix de Tennis de Toulouse was a men's tennis tournament played on indoor carpet in Toulouse, France that was part of the Grand Prix series of the 1982 Grand Prix tennis circuit. It was the first edition of the tournament and was held from 6 December to 12 December.

== Seeds ==
Champion seeds are indicated in bold text while text in italics indicates the round in which those seeds were eliminated.

1. (Czechoslovakia) **Pavel Složil** / (Czechoslovakia) **Tomáš Šmíd (champions)**
2. (Sweden) Anders Järryd / (Sweden) Hans Simonsson (first round)
3. (Italy) Gianni Marchetti / (Italy) Enzo Vattuone (quarterfinals)
4. (Sweden) Joakim Nyström / (Sweden) Magnus Tideman (quarterfinals)

== Draw ==
Key

- Q = Qualifier
- WC = Wild card
- LL = Lucky loser
- Alt = Alternate
- ITF = ITF entry
- PR = Protected ranking
- SR = Special ranking
- SE = Special exempt
- JE = Junior exempt
- JR = Junior Accelerator Programme entrant
- CO = College Accelerator Programme entrant
- NG = Next Gen Accelerator Program entrant
- w/o = Walkover
- r = Retired
- d = Defaulted

=== Finals ===
First round
1	(Czechoslovakia) **Pavel Složil** **(Czechoslovakia) Tomáš Šmíd**	**6**	**6**
(France) Christophe Bernelle (France) Jean-Marc Piacentile	4	4
(France) **Denis Naegelen** **(France) Jérôme Potier**	**7**	**6**
(West Germany) Eric Jelen (West Germany) Michael Westphal	6	3
3	(Italy) **Gianni Marchetti** **(Italy) Enzo Vattuone**	**6**	**6**
(Chile) Gabriel de Los Santos (United Kingdom) Tim Robson	1	2
(Switzerland) **Jakob Hlasek** **(Netherlands) Louk Sanders**	**6**	**6**
(Czechoslovakia) Jiří Granát (Austria) Robert Reininger	1	4
(West Germany) **Jaromir Becka** **(Socialist Federal Republic of Yugoslavia) Slobodan Živojinović**	4	**7**	**6**
(France) Georges Goven (France) Thierry Tulasne	**6**	5	3
4	(Sweden) **Joakim Nyström** **(Sweden) Magnus Tideman**	6	**7**	**6**
(Australia) Russell Barlow (France) Thierry Pham	**7**	5	1
(France) **Jean-Louis Haillet** **(France) Yannick Noah**	6	**6**	**9**
(Czechoslovakia) Stanislav Birner (Sweden) Stefan Simonsson	**7**	3	7
(Spain) **Miguel Mir** **(Spain) Juan Antonio Rodríguez**	**7**	**6**
2	(Sweden) Anders Järryd (Sweden) Hans Simonsson	6	2

Quarterfinals
1	(Czechoslovakia) **P Složil** **(Czechoslovakia) Tomáš Šmíd**	3	**7**	**6**
(France) D Naegelen (France) Jérôme Potier	**6**	5	2
3	(Italy) G Marchetti (Italy) E Vattuone	3	6
(Switzerland) **J Hlasek** **(Netherlands) L Sanders**	**6**	**7**
(West Germany) **J Becka** **(Socialist Federal Republic of Yugoslavia) S Živojinović**	**6**	**6**
4	(Sweden) J Nyström (Sweden) M Tideman	2	1
(France) **J-L Haillet** **(France) Y Noah**	4	**6**	**7**
(Spain) M Mir (Spain) JA Rodríguez	**6**	3	5

Semifinals
1	(Czechoslovakia) **P Složil** **(Czechoslovakia) T Šmíd**	**6**	**6**
(Switzerland) J Hlasek (Netherlands) L Sanders	3	1
(West Germany) J Becka (Socialist Federal Republic of Yugoslavia) S Živojinović	4	3
(France) **J-L Haillet** **(France) Y Noah**	**6**	**6**

Final
1	(Czechoslovakia) **P Složil** **(Czechoslovakia) T Šmíd**	**6**	**6**
(France) J-L Haillet (France) Y Noah	4	4
