= 1987 Mercedes Cup – Singles =

Singles
- 1987 Mercedes Cup

Final
- Champion: (Czechoslovakia) Miloslav Mečíř
- Runner-up: (Sweden) Jan Gunnarsson
- Score: 6–0, 6–2

Details
- Draw: 48 (4WC/6Q)
- Seeds: 16

Events
| Singles | Doubles |
- Stuttgart Open

Martín Jaite was the defending champion, but did not compete this year.

First-seeded Miloslav Mečíř won the title by defeating Jan Gunnarsson 6–0, 6–2 in the final.

== Seeds ==
All seeds received a bye into the second round.

1. (Czechoslovakia) Miloslav Mečíř (champion)
2. (France) Henri Leconte (quarterfinals)
3. (United States) Brad Gilbert (third round)
4. (Sweden) Mikael Pernfors (second round)
5. (Switzerland) Jakob Hlasek (quarterfinals)
6. (Sweden) Ulf Stenlund (second round)
7. (United States) Aaron Krickstein (second round)
8. (Czechoslovakia) Karel Nováček (third round)
9. (France) Guy Forget (third round)
10. (India) Ramesh Krishnan (second round)
11. (Austria) Horst Skoff (third round)
12. (Czechoslovakia) Milan Šrejber (second round)
13. (Sweden) Jan Gunnarsson (final)
14. (Argentina) Eduardo Bengoechea (quarterfinals)
15. (West Germany) Andreas Maurer (second round)
16. (Austria) Thomas Muster (third round)

== Draw ==
Key

- Q = Qualifier
- WC = Wild card
- LL = Lucky loser
- Alt = Alternate
- ITF = ITF entry
- PR = Protected ranking
- SR = Special ranking
- SE = Special exempt
- JE = Junior exempt
- JR = Junior Accelerator Programme entrant
- CO = College Accelerator Programme entrant
- NG = Next Gen Accelerator Program entrant
- w/o = Walkover
- r = Retired
- d = Defaulted

=== Finals ===
Quarterfinals
1 | (Czechoslovakia) Miloslav Mečíř | 4 | 6 | 6
(Czechoslovakia) Marián Vajda | 6 | 3 | 1
14 | (Argentina) Eduardo Bengoechea | 3 | 2
(Czechoslovakia) Tomáš Šmíd | 6 | 6
5 | (Switzerland) Jakob Hlasek | 4 | 4
13 | (Sweden) Jan Gunnarsson | 6 | 6
(West Germany) Carl-Uwe Steeb | 7 | 6
2 | (France) Henri Leconte | 5 | 3

Semifinals
1 | (Czechoslovakia) Miloslav Mečíř | 6 | 6
(Czechoslovakia) Tomáš Šmíd | 3 | 3
13 | (Sweden) Jan Gunnarsson | 6 | 7
(West Germany) Carl-Uwe Steeb | 4 | 6

Final
1 | (Czechoslovakia) Miloslav Mečíř | 6 | 6
13 | (Sweden) Jan Gunnarsson | 0 | 2

=== Top half ===
==== Section 1 ====
First round
WC | (Sweden) M Tideman | 7 | 3 | 6
(Netherlands) M Schapers | 6 | 6 | 3
(Switzerland) C Mezzadri | 2 | 6 | 6
(Switzerland) R Stadler | 6 | 0 | 3
(Brazil) C Motta | 6 | 4
(Czechoslovakia) M Vajda | 7 | 6
Q | (West Germany) U Riglewski | 6 | 7
(Australia) B Drewett | 4 | 6

Second round
1 | (Czechoslovakia) M Mečíř | 6 | 6
WC | (Sweden) M Tideman | 2 | 4
(Switzerland) C Mezzadri | 6 | 3
16 | (Austria) T Muster | 7 | 6
10 | (India) R Krishnan | 7 | 4 | 2
(Czechoslovakia) M Vajda | 5 | 6 | 6
Q | (West Germany) U Riglewski | 6 | 3 | 4
8 | (Czechoslovakia) K Nováček | 4 | 6 | 6

Third round
1 | (Czechoslovakia) M Mečíř | 6 | 6
16 | (Austria) T Muster | 2 | 1
(Czechoslovakia) M Vajda | 6 | 2 | 6
8 | (Czechoslovakia) K Nováček | 4 | 6 | 4

Quarterfinals
1 | (Czechoslovakia) M Mečíř | 4 | 6 | 6
(Czechoslovakia) M Vajda | 6 | 3 | 1

==== Section 2 ====
First round
(West Germany) P Vojtisek | 6 | 6
WC | (Socialist Federal Republic of Yugoslavia) M Ostoja | 4 | 3
(Sweden) P Lundgren | 6 | 2
(Australia) C Limberger | 7 | 6
Q | (Czechoslovakia) J Čihák | 6 | 6 | 6
(United States) T Nelson | 4 | 7 | 3
(Czechoslovakia) T Šmíd | 6 | 7
(West Germany) R Osterthun | 3 | 6

Second round
4 | (Sweden) M Pernfors | 6 | 6 | 1
(West Germany) P Vojtisek | 4 | 7 | 6
(Australia) C Limberger | 6 | 3
14 | (Argentina) E Bengoechea | 7 | 6
11 | (Austria) H Skoff | 6 | 6
Q | (Czechoslovakia) J Čihák | 4 | 4
(Czechoslovakia) T Šmíd | 7 | 6
6 | (Sweden) U Stenlund | 6 | 3

Third round
(West Germany) P Vojtisek | 4 | 2
14 | (Argentina) E Bengoechea | 6 | 6
11 | (Austria) H Skoff | 6 | 6 | 4
(Czechoslovakia) T Šmíd | 7 | 4 | 6

Quarterfinals
14 | (Argentina) E Bengoechea | 3 | 2
(Czechoslovakia) T Šmíd | 6 | 6

=== Bottom half ===
==== Section 3 ====
First round
Q | (Japan) S Matsuoka | 4 | 6 | 2
WC | (Iran) M Bahrami | 6 | 0 | 6
(Australia) P McNamee | 7 | 6
Q | (Spain) J Colás | 5 | 3
(Sweden) H Sundström | 6 | 6
Q | (Romania) A Marcu | 4 | 2
Q | (United States) R Leach | 6 | 4 | 1
(Australia) B Dyke | 1 | 6 | 6

Second round
5 | (Switzerland) J Hlasek | 6 | 6
WC | (Iran) M Bahrami | 3 | 3
(Australia) P McNamee | 7 | 6
12 | (Czechoslovakia) M Šrejber | 6 | 4
13 | (Sweden) J Gunnarsson | 6 | 7 | 4
(Sweden) H Sundström | 7 | 6 | 1^{r}
(Australia) B Dyke | 1 | 4
3 | (United States) B Gilbert | 6 | 6

Third round
5 | (Switzerland) J Hlasek | 6 | 6
(Australia) P McNamee | 4 | 4
13 | (Sweden) J Gunnarsson | 6 | 3 | 7
3 | (United States) B Gilbert | 4 | 6 | 5

Quarterfinals
5 | (Switzerland) J Hlasek | 4 | 4
13 | (Sweden) J Gunnarsson | 6 | 6

==== Section 4 ====
First round
(West Germany) CU Steeb | 7 | 6
(Sweden) C Bergström | 6 | 4
(Czechoslovakia) J Navrátil | 6 | 4 | 7
(West Germany) M Westphal | 3 | 6 | 6
(West Germany) D Keretić | 6 | 6
(New Zealand) K Evernden | 2 | 3
WC | (West Germany) H Schwaier | 4 | 2
(Argentina) F Yunis | 6 | 6

Second round
7 | (United States) A Krickstein | 0 | 4
(West Germany) CU Steeb | 6 | 6
(Czechoslovakia) J Navrátil | 3 | 6 | 6
9 | (France) G Forget | 6 | 4 | 7
15 | (West Germany) A Maurer | 6 | 3
(West Germany) D Keretić | 7 | 6
(Argentina) F Yunis | 4 | 6 | 3
2 | (France) H Leconte | 6 | 4 | 6

Third round
(West Germany) CU Steeb | 6 | 1 | 6
9 | (France) G Forget | 2 | 6 | 3
(West Germany) D Keretić | 6 | 3 | 4
2 | (France) H Leconte | 2 | 6 | 6

Quarterfinals
(West Germany) CU Steeb | 7 | 6
2 | (France) H Leconte | 5 | 3
