= 1983 Swedish Open – Singles =

Singles
- 1983 Swedish Open

Final
- Champion: (Sweden) Mats Wilander
- Runner-up: (Sweden) Anders Järryd
- Score: 6–1, 6–2

Details
- Draw: 32
- Seeds: 8

Events
Singles	Doubles
- Swedish Open

Mats Wilander successfully defended his title, by defeating Anders Järryd 6–1, 6–2 in the final.

== Seeds ==
1. (Sweden) Mats Wilander (champion)
2. (Sweden) Henrik Sundström (quarterfinals)
3. (France) Christophe Roger-Vasselin (first round)
4. (United States) Mike De Palmer (first round)
5. (Sweden) Thomas Högstedt (first round)
6. (Sweden) Stefan Simonsson (quarterfinals)
7. (Belgium) Bernard Boileau (quarterfinals)
8. (Sweden) Hans Simonsson (first round)

== Draw ==
Key

- Q = Qualifier
- WC = Wild card
- LL = Lucky loser
- Alt = Alternate
- ITF = ITF entry
- PR = Protected ranking
- SR = Special ranking
- SE = Special exempt
- JE = Junior exempt
- JR = Junior Accelerator Programme entrant
- CO = College Accelerator Programme entrant
- NG = Next Gen Accelerator Program entrant
- w/o = Walkover
- r = Retired
- d = Defaulted

=== Finals ===
Semifinals
1	(Sweden) Mats Wilander	6	6
(United States) Jim Gurfein	3	1
(Sweden) Anders Järryd	6	6
(United States) Scott Lipton	3	4

Final
1	(Sweden) Mats Wilander	6	6
(Sweden) Anders Järryd	1	2

=== Top half ===
First round
1	(Sweden) M Wilander	6	6
(Sweden) J Nyström	3	1
(Austria) B Pils	4	4
(Sweden) S Edberg	6	6
LL	(Austria) H-P Kandler	6	6	0
Q	(Sweden) J Carlsson	3	7	6
(Sweden) P Hjertquist	2	3
6	(Sweden) S Simonsson	6	6
3	(France) C Roger-Vasselin	6	3	1
(United States) J Gurfein	2	6	6
Q	(Sweden) R Båthman	6	6
(Argentina) G Tiberti	3	3
(Switzerland) R Stadler	7	3	1
(West Germany) K Meiler	6	6	6
(New Zealand) B Derlin	2	7	4
7	(Belgium) B Boileau	6	6	6

Second round
1	(Sweden) M Wilander	6	7
(Sweden) S Edberg	3	5
Q	(Sweden) J Carlsson	2	4
6	(Sweden) S Simonsson	6	6
(United States) J Gurfein	7	7
Q	(Sweden) R Båthman	6	6
(West Germany) K Meiler	4	2
7	(Belgium) B Boileau	6	6

Quarterfinals
1	(Sweden) M Wilander	6	6
6	(Sweden) S Simonsson	1	2
(United States) J Gurfein	6	6
7	(Belgium) B Boileau	3	2

Semifinals
1	(Sweden) M Wilander	6	6
(United States) J Gurfein	3	1

=== Bottom half ===
First round
5	(Sweden) T Hogstedt	6	5	2
(Socialist Federal Republic of Yugoslavia) M Ostoja	3	7	6
(Sweden) A Järryd	6	6
(Switzerland) J Hlasek	4	3
(Sweden) J Gunnarsson	6	7
(Spain) J Lopez-Maeso	4	5
(Czechoslovakia) J Navrátil	6	6
4	(United States) M De Palmer	3	2
8	(Sweden) H Simonsson	3	5
(United States) S Lipton	6	7
(Sweden) M Tideman	5	5
Q	(Spain) R Vizcaíno	7	7
(New Zealand) J Simpson	1	6
Q	(France) J Vanier	6	7
(Italy) G Rinaldini	4	4
2	(Sweden) H Sundström	6	6

Second round
(Socialist Federal Republic of Yugoslavia) M Ostoja	3	3
(Sweden) A Järryd	6	6
(Sweden) J Gunnarsson	7	6
(Czechoslovakia) J Navrátil	5	2
(United States) S Lipton	6	6
Q	(Spain) R Vizcaíno	2	3
Q	(France) J Vanier	2	6	4
2	(Sweden) H Sundström	6	3	6

Quarterfinals
(Sweden) A Järryd	6	6
(Sweden) J Gunnarsson	3	3
(United States) S Lipton	6	7
2	(Sweden) H Sundström	2	6

Semifinals
(Sweden) A Järryd	6	6
(United States) S Lipton	3	4
