= 1983 Swedish Open – Doubles =

Doubles
- 1983 Swedish Open

Final
- Champions: (Sweden) Joakim Nyström (Sweden) Mats Wilander
- Runners-up: (Sweden) Anders Järryd (Sweden) Hans Simonsson
- Score: 1–6, 7–6^{(7–4)}, 7–6^{(7–4)}

Details
- Draw: 16
- Seeds: 4

Events
Singles	Doubles
- Swedish Open

Anders Järryd and Hans Simonsson were the defending champions, but lost in the final to Joakim Nyström and Mats Wilander. The final score was 1–6, 7–6^{(7–4)}, 7–6^{(7–4)}

== Seeds ==
1. (Sweden) Anders Järryd / (Sweden) Hans Simonsson (final)
2. (Sweden) Joakim Nyström / (Sweden) Mats Wilander (champions)
3. (Sweden) Jan Gunnarsson / (New Zealand) Jeff Simpson (quarterfinals)
4. (Sweden) Stefan Simonsson / (Sweden) Henrik Sundström (quarterfinals)

== Draw ==
Key

- Q = Qualifier
- WC = Wild card
- LL = Lucky loser
- Alt = Alternate
- ITF = ITF entry
- PR = Protected ranking
- SR = Special ranking
- SE = Special exempt
- JE = Junior exempt
- JR = Junior Accelerator Programme entrant
- CO = College Accelerator Programme entrant
- NG = Next Gen Accelerator Program entrant
- w/o = Walkover
- r = Retired
- d = Defaulted

=== Draw ===
First round
1	(Sweden) A Järryd (Sweden) H Simonsson	6	7
(United States) J Gurfein (France) J Vanier	0	6
(Socialist Federal Republic of Yugoslavia) M Ostoja (Argentina) G Tiberti	6	6
(Spain) J Lopez-Maeso (Spain) R Sánchez Rueda	3	2
(Spain) A Gimenez (Spain) R Vizcaíno	1	2
4	(Sweden) S Simonsson (Sweden) H Sundström	6	6
(Sweden) S Edberg (Sweden) M Tideman	6	6	6
(Finland) J Berner (Denmark) M Mortensen	3	7	2
(West Germany) K Meiler (Czechoslovakia) J Navrátil	6	6
(Sweden) R Båthman (Sweden) S Svensson	2	4
3	(Sweden) J Gunnarsson (New Zealand) J Simpson	6	6
(United States) S Lipton (United States) R Royer	3	3
(Switzerland) J Hlasek (Switzerland) R Stadler	6	6
(United States) M De Palmer (Sweden) P Hjertquist	3	4
(Sweden) T Hogstedt (Sweden) J Windahl	4	4
2	(Sweden) J Nyström (Sweden) M Wilander	6	6

Quarterfinals
1	(Sweden) A Järryd (Sweden) H Simonsson	6	6
(Socialist Federal Republic of Yugoslavia) M Ostoja (Argentina) G Tiberti	4	2
4	(Sweden) S Simonsson (Sweden) H Sundström	6	5
(Sweden) S Edberg (Sweden) M Tideman	7	7
(West Germany) K Meiler (Czechoslovakia) J Navrátil	4	6	6
3	(Sweden) J Gunnarsson (New Zealand) J Simpson	6	3	4
(Switzerland) J Hlasek (Switzerland) R Stadler	4	6	3
2	(Sweden) J Nyström (Sweden) M Wilander	6	4	6

Semifinals
1	(Sweden) A Järryd (Sweden) H Simonsson	6	6
(Sweden) S Edberg (Sweden) M Tideman	0	3
(West Germany) K Meiler (Czechoslovakia) J Navrátil	1	7	4
2	(Sweden) J Nyström (Sweden) M Wilander	6	5	6

Final
1	(Sweden) A Järryd (Sweden) H Simonsson	6	6^{4}	6^{4}
2	(Sweden) J Nyström (Sweden) M Wilander	1	7^{7}	7^{7}
