= 1984 Grand Prix de Tennis de Toulouse – Doubles =

Doubles
- 1984 Grand Prix de Tennis de Toulouse

Final
- Champions: (Sweden) Jan Gunnarsson (Denmark) Michael Mortensen
- Runners-up: (Czechoslovakia) Pavel Složil (United States) Tim Wilkison
- Score: 6–4, 6–2

Events
Singles	Doubles
← 1983 ·	Grand Prix de Tennis de Toulouse	· 1985 →

The 1984 Grand Prix de Tennis de Toulouse was a men's tennis tournament played on indoor carpet in Toulouse, France that was part of the Regular Series of the 1984 Grand Prix tennis circuit. It was the third edition of the tournament and was held from 19 November – 25 November.

== Seeds ==
Champion seeds are indicated in bold text while text in italics indicates the round in which those seeds were eliminated.

1. (Switzerland) Heinz Günthardt / (Hungary) Balázs Taróczy (first round)
2. (Sweden) Anders Järryd / (Sweden) Hans Simonsson (semifinals)
3. (Czechoslovakia) Pavel Složil / (United States) Tim Wilkison (final)
4. (Sweden) **Jan Gunnarsson** / (Denmark) **Michael Mortensen (champions)**

== Draw ==
=== Key ===
- Q = Qualifier
- WC = Wild card
- LL = Lucky loser
- Alt = Alternate
- SE = Special exempt
- PR = Protected ranking
- ITF = ITF entry
- JE = Junior exempt
- w/o = Walkover
- r = Retired
- d = Defaulted
- SR = Special ranking

=== Finals ===
First round
(United States) **Gary Donnelly** **(Czechoslovakia) Libor Pimek**	**6**	4	**6**
1	(Switzerland) Heinz Günthardt (Hungary) Balázs Taróczy	1	**6**	3
(Czechoslovakia) **Stanislav Birner** **(United States) Andy Kohlberg**	**6**	3	**6**
(Belgium) Bernard Boileau (France) Pascal Portes	2	**6**	4
4	(Sweden) **Jan Gunnarsson** **(Denmark) Michael Mortensen**	**6**	**6**
(West Germany) Ricki Osterthun (Czechoslovakia) Marián Vajda	3	4
(Iran) **Mansour Bahrami** **(Uruguay) Diego Pérez**	3	**6**	**6**
(United States) Todd Nelson (France) Yannick Noah	**6**	3	4
(United States) **Dan Cassidy** **(Socialist Federal Republic of Yugoslavia) Marko Ostoja**	**6**	3	**6**
(United States) Mark Dickson (tennis) (Spain) Emilio Sánchez	4	**6**	2
3	(Czechoslovakia) **Pavel Složil** **(United States) Tim Wilkison**	**6**	**6**
(West Germany) Hans Schwaier (West Germany) Michael Westphal	2	3
(United States) **Chip Hooper** **(Romania) Ilie Năstase**	**6**	3	**6**
(Czechoslovakia) Jaroslav Navrátil (Netherlands) Michiel Schapers	4	**6**	3
2	(Sweden) **Anders Järryd** **(Sweden) Hans Simonsson**	**6**	**6**
(Sweden) Johan Carlsson (Sweden) Jonas Svensson	1	4

Quarterfinals
(United States) G Donnelly (Czechoslovakia) L Pimek	4	**6**	3
(Czechoslovakia) **S Birner** **(United States) A Kohlberg**	**6**	1	**6**
4	(Sweden) **J Gunnarsson** **(Denmark) M Mortensen**	**6**	**7**
(Iran) M Bahrami (Uruguay) D Pérez	4	6
(United States) D Cassidy (Socialist Federal Republic of Yugoslavia) M Ostoja	3	2
3	(Czechoslovakia) **P Složil** **(United States) T Wilkison**	**6**	**6**
(United States) C Hooper (Romania) I Năstase	1	4
2	(Sweden) **A Järryd** **(Sweden) H Simonsson**	**6**	**6**

Semifinals
(Czechoslovakia) S Birner (United States) A Kohlberg	**7**	4	2
4	(Sweden) **J Gunnarsson** **(Denmark) M Mortensen**	6	**6**	**6**
3	(Czechoslovakia) **P Složil** **(United States) T Wilkison**	**6**	3	**6**
2	(Sweden) A Järryd (Sweden) H Simonsson	2	**6**	4

Final
4	(Sweden) **J Gunnarsson** **(Denmark) M Mortensen**	**6**	**6**
3	(Czechoslovakia) P Složil (United States) T Wilkison	4	2
