= 1983 Grand Prix de Tennis de Toulouse =

- Date: 21–27 November
- Edition: 2nd
- Category: Grand Prix
- Draw: 32S / 16D
- Prize money: $100,000
- Surface: Carpet / indoor
- Location: Toulouse, France

Champions

Singles
- (Switzerland) Heinz Günthardt

Doubles
- (Switzerland) Heinz Günthardt / (Czechoslovakia) Pavel Složil
← 1982 ·	Grand Prix de Tennis de Toulouse	· 1984 →

The 1983 Grand Prix de Tennis de Toulouse was a men's tennis tournament played on indoor Carpet courts in Toulouse, France that was part of the Grand Prix series of the 1983 Grand Prix tennis circuit. It was the second edition of the tournament and was held from 21 November until 27 November 1983. First-seeded Heinz Günthardt won the singles title.

== Finals ==
=== Singles ===
(Switzerland) Heinz Günthardt defeated (Peru) Pablo Arraya, 6–0, 6–2

- It was Günthardt's only singles title of the year and the 5th and last of his career.

=== Doubles ===
(Switzerland) Heinz Günthardt / (Czechoslovakia) Pavel Složil defeated (South Africa) Bernard Mitton / (United States) Butch Walts, 5–7, 7–5, 6–4
