= 1987 Monte Carlo Open =

- Date: 20–26 April
- Edition: 81st
- Category: Grand Prix
- Draw: 48S / 24D
- Prize money: $415,000
- Surface: Clay / outdoor
- Location: Roquebrune-Cap-Martin, France
- Venue: Monte Carlo Country Club

Champions

Singles
- (Sweden) Mats Wilander

Doubles
- (Chile) Hans Gildemeister / (Ecuador) Andrés Gómez
- Monte Carlo Open

The 1987 Monte Carlo Open was a men's tennis tournament played on outdoor clay courts at the Monte Carlo Country Club in Roquebrune-Cap-Martin, France that was part of the 1987 Nabisco Grand Prix. It was the 81st edition of the tournament and was held from 20 April through 26 April 1987. First-seeded Mats Wilander won the singles title, his second at the event after 1983.

== Finals ==
=== Singles ===
(Sweden) Mats Wilander defeated (United States) Jimmy Arias, 4–6, 7–5, 6–1, 6–3

- It was Wilander's 2nd singles title of the year and the 23rd of his career.

=== Doubles ===
(Chile) Hans Gildemeister / (Ecuador) Andrés Gómez defeated (Iran) Mansour Bahrami / (Denmark) Michael Mortensen, 6–2, 6–4
