= 1984 Grand Prix de Tennis de Toulouse – Singles =

Singles
- 1984 Grand Prix de Tennis de Toulouse

Final
- Champion: (United States) Mark Dickson
- Runner-up: (Switzerland) Heinz Günthardt
- Score: 7–6, 6–4

Details
- Draw: 32
- Seeds: 8

Events
Singles	Doubles
← 1983 ·	Grand Prix de Tennis de Toulouse	· 1985 →

The 1984 Grand Prix de Tennis de Toulouse was a men's tennis tournament played on indoor carpet courts in Toulouse, France that was part of the Regular Series of the 1984 Grand Prix tennis circuit. It was the third edition of the tournament and was held from 19 November until 25 November 1984.

== Seeds ==
Champion seeds are indicated in bold text while text in italics indicates the round in which those seeds were eliminated.

1. (Sweden) Anders Järryd (semifinals)
2. (France) Yannick Noah (quarterfinals)
3. (Czechoslovakia) Libor Pimek (first round)
4. (Switzerland) Heinz Günthardt (final)
5. (United States) Tim Wilkison (first round)
6. (Czechoslovakia) Pavel Složil (second round)
7. (Uruguay) Diego Pérez (first round)
8. (Sweden) Jan Gunnarsson (first round)

== Draw ==
=== Key ===
- Q = Qualifier
- WC = Wild card
- LL = Lucky loser
- Alt = Alternate
- SE = Special exempt
- PR = Protected ranking
- ITF = ITF entry
- JE = Junior exempt
- w/o = Walkover
- r = Retired
- d = Defaulted
- SR = Special ranking

=== Finals ===
Semifinals
1	(Sweden) Anders Järryd	**6**	3	**6**
4	**(Switzerland) Heinz Günthardt**	3	**6**	3
(West Germany) Michael Westphal	2	6
**(United States) Mark Dickson**	**6**	**7**

Final
4	(Switzerland) Heinz Günthardt	6	4
**(United States) Mark Dickson**	**7**	**6**

=== Top half ===
First round
1	**(Sweden) A Järryd**	**6**	**6**
(Belgium) B Boileau	0	2
**(Socialist Federal Republic of Yugoslavia) M Ostoja**	4	**6**	**6**
(Czechoslovakia) M Vajda	**6**	3	2
**(Sweden) H Simonsson**	**6**	**6**
(Brazil) M Hocevar	2	4
**(Czechoslovakia) J Navrátil**	**7**	**6**
5	(United States) T Wilkison	6	1
4	**(Switzerland) H Günthardt**	**6**	**7**
(United States) D Cassidy	2	6
**(Czechoslovakia) S Birner**	**7**	**6**
(Iran) M Bahrami	5	4
**(France) P Portes**	**6**	**6**
(Czechoslovakia) K Nováček	4	1
**(United States) C Hooper**	**6**	**6**
7	(Uruguay) D Pérez	4	0

Second round
1	**(Sweden) A Järryd**	**7**	**6**
(Socialist Federal Republic of Yugoslavia) M Ostoja	6	3
(Sweden) H Simonsson	2	6
**(Czechoslovakia) J Navrátil**	**6**	**7**
4	**(Switzerland) H Günthardt**	**6**	**6**
(Czechoslovakia) S Birner	2	3
**(France) P Portes**	**6**	6	**6**
(United States) C Hooper	2	**7**	3

Quarterfinals
1	**(Sweden) A Järryd**	**6**	**6**
(Czechoslovakia) J Navrátil	1	1
4	**(Switzerland) H Günthardt**	3	**6**	**6**
(France) P Portes	**6**	2	2

Semifinals
1	(Sweden) A Järryd	**6**	3	**6**
4	**(Switzerland) H Günthardt**	3	**6**	3

=== Bottom half ===
First round
6	**(Czechoslovakia) P Složil**	**6**	6	**6**
(United States) T Nelson	4	**7**	3
**(West Germany) M Westphal**	**6**	**6**
(Socialist Federal Republic of Yugoslavia) S Živojinović	0	3
**(Netherlands) M Schapers**	**6**	**7**
(Spain) E Sánchez	4	6
**(West Germany) R Osterthun**	**6**	**7**
3	(Czechoslovakia) L Pimek	3	5
**(United States) J Brown**	3	**7**	**6**
8	(Sweden) J Gunnarsson	**6**	6	4
**(United States) M Dickson**	**6**	**6**
(West Germany) H Schwaier	0	4
**(Sweden) J Svensson**	**6**	**7**
(Hungary) B Taróczy	4	6
2	**(France) Y Noah**	**6**	**6**
(Romania) I Năstase	3	3

Second round
6	(Czechoslovakia) P Složil	1	4
**(West Germany) M Westphal**	**6**	**6**
(Netherlands) M Schapers	2	0	R
**(West Germany) R Osterthun**	**6**	4
(United States) J Brown	3	**6**	2
**(United States) M Dickson**	**6**	3	**6**
(Sweden) J Svensson	4	5
2	**(France) Y Noah**	**6**	**7**

Quarterfinals
**(West Germany) M Westphal**	**7**	**6**
(West Germany) R Osterthun	5	4
**(United States) M Dickson**	**6**	**7**
2	(France) Y Noah	3	5

Semifinals
(West Germany) M Westphal	2	6
**(United States) M Dickson**	**6**	**7**
