= 1987 Mercedes Cup =

- Date: 13–19 July
- Edition: 10th
- Category: Grand Prix
- Draw: 48S / 24D
- Prize money: $200,000
- Surface: Clay / outdoor
- Location: Stuttgart, West Germany
- Venue: Tennis Club Weissenhof

Champions

Singles
- (Czechoslovakia) Miloslav Mečíř

Doubles
- (United States) Rick Leach / (United States) Tim Pawsat
- Stuttgart Open

The 1987 Mercedes Cup, was a men's tennis tournament played on outdoor clay courts and held at the Tennis Club Weissenhof in Stuttgart, West Germany that was part of the 1987 Grand Prix circuit. It was the 10th edition of the tournament and was held from 13 July until 19 July 1987. First-seeded Miloslav Mečíř won the singles title.

== Finals ==
=== Singles ===
(Czechoslovakia) Miloslav Mečíř defeated (Sweden) Jan Gunnarsson, 6–0, 6–2

- It was Mečíř's 5th singles title of the year and the 8th of his career.

=== Doubles ===
(United States) Rick Leach / (United States) Tim Pawsat defeated (Sweden) Mikael Pernfors / (Sweden) Magnus Tideman, 6–3, 6–4
