= 1987 Monte Carlo Open – Doubles =

Doubles
- 1987 Monte Carlo Open

Final
- Champions: (Chile) Hans Gildemeister (Ecuador) Andrés Gómez
- Runners-up: (Iran) Mansour Bahrami (Denmark) Michael Mortensen
- Score: 6–2, 6–4

Details
- Draw: 24 (2WC)
- Seeds: 8

Events
| Singles | Doubles |
- Monte-Carlo Masters

Guy Forget and Yannick Noah were the defending champions, but lost in the quarterfinals to Mansour Bahrami and Michael Mortensen.

Hans Gildemeister and Andrés Gómez won the title by defeating Bahrami and Mortensen 6–2, 6–4 in the final.

== Seeds ==
All eight seeds received a bye to the second round.

1. (France) Guy Forget / (France) Yannick Noah (quarterfinals)
2. (Chile) Hans Gildemeister / (Ecuador) Andrés Gómez (champions)
3. (West Germany) Boris Becker / (Socialist Federal Republic of Yugoslavia) Slobodan Živojinović (quarterfinals)
4. (Sweden) Joakim Nyström / (Sweden) Mats Wilander (semifinals)
5. (Czechoslovakia) Tomáš Šmíd / (South Africa) Christo van Rensburg (semifinals)
6. (Spain) Sergio Casal / (Spain) Emilio Sánchez (quarterfinals)
7. (West Germany) Eric Jelen / (Sweden) Jonas Svensson (second round)
8. (Switzerland) Heinz Günthardt / (Switzerland) Jakob Hlasek (quarterfinals)

== Draw ==
Key

- Q = Qualifier
- WC = Wild card
- LL = Lucky loser
- Alt = Alternate
- ITF = ITF entry
- PR = Protected ranking
- SR = Special ranking
- SE = Special exempt
- JE = Junior exempt
- JR = Junior Accelerator Programme entrant
- CO = College Accelerator Programme entrant
- NG = Next Gen Accelerator Program entrant
- w/o = Walkover
- r = Retired
- d = Defaulted

=== Finals ===
Semifinals
(Iran) Mansour Bahrami (Denmark) Michael Mortensen | 7 | 7
4 | (Sweden) Joakim Nyström (Sweden) Mats Wilander | 6 | 5
5 | (Czechoslovakia) Tomáš Šmíd (South Africa) Christo van Rensburg | 2 | 5
2 | (Chile) Hans Gildemeister (Ecuador) Andrés Gómez | 6 | 7

Final
(Iran) Mansour Bahrami (Denmark) Michael Mortensen | 2 | 4
2 | (Chile) Hans Gildemeister (Ecuador) Andrés Gómez | 6 | 6

=== Top half ===
First round
(Italy) C Panatta (United States) M Purcell | 6 | 6
(United States) J Arias (United States) G Holmes | 3 | 4
(Iran) M Bahrami (Denmark) M Mortensen | 6 | 6
WC | (Spain) T Carbonell (Spain) J Sánchez | 0 | 0
(West Germany) T Meinecke (West Germany) CU Steeb | 4 | 6
(Sweden) J Gunnarsson (Sweden) P Lundgren | 6 | 7
(Italy) P Canè (Italy) S Colombo | 6 | 5 | 3
(Australia) B Dyke (Australia) L Warder | 4 | 7 | 6

Second round
1 | (France) G Forget (France) Y Noah | 6 | 6 | 7
(Italy) C Panatta (United States) M Purcell | 3 | 7 | 5
(Iran) M Bahrami (Denmark) M Mortensen | 6 | 4 | 6
7 | (Germany) E Jelen (Sweden) J Svensson | 1 | 6 | 4
4 | (Sweden) J Nyström (Sweden) M Wilander | 6 | 6
(Sweden) J Gunnarsson (Sweden) P Lundgren | 4 | 4
(Australia) B Dyke (Australia) L Warder | 6 | 4
6 | (Spain) S Casal (Spain) E Sánchez | 7 | 6

Quarterfinals
1 | (France) G Forget (France) Y Noah | 7 | 6 | 6
(Iran) M Bahrami (Denmark) M Mortensen | 5 | 7 | 7
4 | (Sweden) J Nyström (Sweden) M Wilander | 6 | 4 | 6
6 | (Spain) S Casal (Spain) E Sánchez | 4 | 6 | 3

Semifinals
(Iran) M Bahrami (Denmark) M Mortensen | 7 | 7
4 | (Sweden) J Nyström (Sweden) M Wilander | 6 | 5

=== Bottom half ===
First round
(Australia) D Cahill (Australia) M Kratzmann | 6 | 5 | 2
(United States) J Pugh (France) É Winogradsky | 3 | 7 | 6
(Spain) J Arrese (Spain) D de Miguel | 3 | 4
(Argentina) G Luza (Argentina) G Tiberti | 6 | 6
(Brazil) L Mattar (Brazil) C Motta | 6 | 7
WC | (France) T Champion (France) T Tulasne | 2 | 6
(Czechoslovakia) S Birner (Brazil) C Kist | 3 | 4
(France) T Benhabiles (France) L Courteau | 6 | 6

Second round
5 | (Czechoslovakia) T Šmíd (South Africa) C van Rensburg | 6 | 6
(United States) J Pugh (France) É Winogradsky | 3 | 1
(Argentina) G Luza (Argentina) G Tiberti | 2 | 4
3 | (West Germany) B Becker (Socialist Federal Republic of Yugoslavia) S Živojinović | 6 | 6
8 | (Switzerland) H Günthardt (Switzerland) J Hlasek | 6 | 6
(Brazil) L Mattar (Brazil) C Motta | 4 | 3
(France) T Benhabiles (France) L Courteau | 6 | 3
2 | (Chile) H Gildemeister (Ecuador) A Gómez | 7 | 6

Quarterfinals
5 | (Czechoslovakia) T Šmíd (South Africa) C van Rensburg | 7 | 2 | 6
3 | (West Germany) B Becker (Socialist Federal Republic of Yugoslavia) S Živojinović | 6 | 6 | 1
8 | (Switzerland) H Günthardt (Switzerland) J Hlasek | 6 | 6 | 4
2 | (Chile) H Gildemeister (Ecuador) A Gómez | 3 | 7 | 6

Semifinals
5 | (Czechoslovakia) T Šmíd (South Africa) C van Rensburg | 2 | 5
2 | (Chile) H Gildemeister (Ecuador) A Gómez | 6 | 7
