= 1984 Grand Prix de Tennis de Toulouse =

- Date: 19–25 November
- Edition: 3rd
- Category: Regular Series
- Draw: 32S / 16D
- Prize money: $100,000
- Surface: Carpet / indoor
- Location: Toulouse, France

Champions

Singles
- (United States) Mark Dickson

Doubles
- (Sweden) Jan Gunnarsson / (Denmark) Michael Mortensen
← 1983 ·	Grand Prix de Tennis de Toulouse	· 1985 →

The 1984 Grand Prix de Tennis de Toulouse was a men's tennis tournament played on indoor carpet courts in Toulouse, France that was part of the Regular Series of the 1984 Grand Prix tennis circuit. It was the third edition of the tournament and was held from 19 November until 25 November 1984. Unseeded Mark Dickson won the singles title.

== Finals ==
=== Singles ===
(United States) Mark Dickson defeated (Switzerland) Heinz Günthardt, 7–6, 6–4

- It was Dickson's 2nd singles title of the year and of his career.

=== Doubles ===
(Sweden) Jan Gunnarsson / (Denmark) Michael Mortensen defeated (Czechoslovakia) Pavel Složil / (United States) Tim Wilkison, 6–4, 6–2
