= 1987 Monte Carlo Open – Singles =

Singles
- 1987 Monte Carlo Open

Final
- Champion: (Sweden) Mats Wilander
- Runner-up: (United States) Jimmy Arias
- Score: 4–6, 7–5, 6–1, 6–3

Details
- Draw: 48 (6Q / 4WC)
- Seeds: 16

Events
Singles	Doubles
← 1986 ·	Monte Carlo Open	· 1988 →

Joakim Nyström was the defending champion, but lost to Thomas Muster in the second round.

Mats Wilander won the title, defeating Jimmy Arias 4–6, 7–5, 6–1, 6–3 in the final.

== Seeds ==
All sixteen seeds received a bye to the second round.

1. (West Germany) Boris Becker (second round)
2. (Sweden) Stefan Edberg (second round)
3. (France) Yannick Noah (second round)
4. (Sweden) Mats Wilander (champion)
5. (Ecuador) Andrés Gómez (quarterfinals)
6. (Spain) Emilio Sánchez (second round)
7. (Sweden) Kent Carlsson (quarterfinals, retired due to illness)
8. (Sweden) Joakim Nyström (second round)
9. (Argentina) Martín Jaite (quarterfinals)
10. (Argentina) Guillermo Vilas (third round)
11. (Sweden) Jonas Svensson (second round)
12. (Switzerland) Jakob Hlasek (third round)
13. (France) Thierry Tulasne (third round)
14. (France) Tarik Benhabiles (third round)
15. (United States) Aaron Krickstein (third round)
16. (Socialist Federal Republic of Yugoslavia) Slobodan Živojinović (second round)

== Draw ==
=== Key ===
- Q = Qualifier
- WC = Wild card
- LL = Lucky loser
- Alt = Alternate
- SE = Special exempt
- PR = Protected ranking
- ITF = ITF entry
- JE = Junior exempt
- w/o = Walkover
- r = Retired
- d = Defaulted
- SR = Special ranking

=== Finals ===
Quarterfinals
(United States) Jimmy Arias	6	2
7	(Sweden) Kent Carlsson	0	2^{r}
(Austria) Horst Skoff	7	2	6
5	(Ecuador) Andrés Gómez	5	6	4
(Soviet Union) Andrei Chesnokov	1	3
4	(Sweden) Mats Wilander	6	6
9	(Argentina) Martín Jaite	6	0	6
(Sweden) Ulf Stenlund	2	6	7

Semifinals
(United States) Jimmy Arias	7	6
(Austria) Horst Skoff	5	1
4	(Sweden) Mats Wilander	6	6
(Sweden) Ulf Stenlund	2	2

Final
(United States) Jimmy Arias	6	5	1	3
4	(Sweden) Mats Wilander	4	7	6	6

=== Top half ===
==== Section 1 ====
First round
Q	(West Germany) M Westphal	0	4
(United States) J Arias	6	6
(Czechoslovakia) K Nováček	3	7	6
WC	(France) T Champion	6	6	3
(West Germany) E Jelen	2	2
(United States) E Teltscher	6	6
(Argentina) H de la Peña	6	2	6
(Spain) S Casal	2	6	3

Second round
1	(West Germany) B Becker	3	3
(United States) J Arias	6	6
(Czechoslovakia) K Nováček	6	4
15	(United States) A Krickstein	7	6
10	(Argentina) G Vilas	7	6
(United States) E Teltscher	5	3
(Argentina) H de la Peña	1	4
7	(Sweden) K Carlsson	6	6

Third round
(United States) J Arias	7	6
15	(United States) A Krickstein	5	1
10	(Argentina) G Vilas	7	3	2
7	(Sweden) K Carlsson	6	6	6

Quarterfinals
(United States) J Arias	6	2
7	(Sweden) K Carlsson	0	2^{r}

==== Section 2 ====
First round
(Austria) H Skoff	3	7	7
WC	(Peru) P Arraya	6	6	5
(Haiti) R Agénor	6	3	6
(Italy) S Colombo	3	6	4
(United States) J Berger	6	6
WC	(Sweden) H Sundström	4	2
(Italy) P Canè	6	2
(West Germany) A Maurer	7	6

Second round
3	(France) Y Noah	6	5	2
(Austria) H Skoff	3	7	6
(Haiti) R Agénor	2	2
14	(France) T Benhabiles	6	6
12	(Switzerland) J Hlasek	6	6
(United States) J Berger	4	2
(West Germany) A Maurer	1	3
5	(Ecuador) A Gómez	6	6

Third round
(Austria) H Skoff	7	3	7
14	(France) T Benhabiles	5	6	6
12	(Switzerland) J Hlasek	5	1
5	(Ecuador) A Gómez	7	6

Quarterfinals
(Austria) H Skoff	7	2	6
5	(Ecuador) A Gómez	5	6	4

=== Bottom half ===
==== Section 3 ====
First round
Q	(West Germany) R Osterthun	6	6
(Australia) B Dyke	1	1
(Soviet Union) A Chesnokov	7	1	6
Q	(Italy) C Pistolesi	5	6	0
Q	(Sweden) C Bergström	7	2	6
(Czechoslovakia) L Pimek	5	6	1
WC	(Italy) G Ocleppo	2	1
(Sweden) J Gunnarsson	6	6

Second round
6	(Spain) E Sánchez	4	6
Q	(West Germany) R Osterthun	6	7
(Soviet Union) A Chesnokov	6	6
11	(Sweden) J Svensson	2	0
13	(France) T Tulasne	0	6	6
Q	(Sweden) C Bergström	6	3	2
(Sweden) J Gunnarsson	3	2
4	(Sweden) M Wilander	6	6

Third round
Q	(West Germany) R Osterthun	3	4
(Soviet Union) A Chesnokov	6	6
13	(France) T Tulasne	5	3
4	(Sweden) M Wilander	7	6

Quarterfinals
(Soviet Union) A Chesnokov	1	3
4	(Sweden) M Wilander	6	6

==== Section 4 ====
First round
(Austria) T Muster	1	6	6
Q	(Spain) J Sánchez	6	1	3
(Brazil) L Mattar	2	2
(Czechoslovakia) T Šmíd	6	6
Q	(West Germany) T Meinecke	7	6
(France) G Forget	5	1
(Sweden) U Stenlund	6	2	6
(United States) G Holmes	0	6	4

Second round
8	(Sweden) J Svensson	6	3	6
(Austria) T Muster	0	6	7
(Czechoslovakia) T Šmíd	4	2
9	(Argentina) M Jaite	6	6
16	(Socialist Federal Republic of Yugoslavia) S Živojinović	3	4
Q	(West Germany) T Meinecke	6	6
(Sweden) U Stenlund	2	6	6
2	(Sweden) S Edberg	6	1	4

Third round
(Austria) T Muster	2	4
9	(Argentina) M Jaite	6	6
Q	(West Germany) T Meinecke	5	3
(Sweden) U Stenlund	7	6

Quarterfinals
9	(Argentina) M Jaite	6	0	6
(Sweden) U Stenlund	2	6	7
