= 1982 Grand Prix de Tennis de Toulouse – Singles =

Singles
- 1982 Grand Prix de Tennis de Toulouse

Final
- Champion: (France) Yannick Noah
- Runner-up: (Czechoslovakia) Tomáš Šmíd
- Score: 6–3, 6–2

Details
- Draw: 32
- Seeds: 8

Events
Singles	Doubles
- Grand Prix de Tennis de Toulouse

The 1982 Grand Prix de Tennis de Toulouse was a men's tennis tournament played on indoor carpet courts in Toulouse, France that was part of the Grand Prix series of the 1982 Grand Prix tennis circuit. It was the first edition of the tournament and was held from 6 December – 12 December.

== Seeds ==
Champion seeds are indicated in bold text while text in italics indicates the round in which those seeds were eliminated.

1. (France) **Yannick Noah (champion)**
2. (Czechoslovakia) Tomáš Šmíd (final)
3. (Israel) Shlomo Glickstein (quarterfinals)
4. (Sweden) Hans Simonsson (second round)
5. (Sweden) Anders Järryd (quarterfinals)
6. (United States) Bill Scanlon (second round)
7. (France) Thierry Tulasne (first round)
8. (Sweden) Stefan Simonsson (quarterfinals)

== Draw ==
Key

- Q = Qualifier
- WC = Wild card
- LL = Lucky loser
- Alt = Alternate
- ITF = ITF entry
- PR = Protected ranking
- SR = Special ranking
- SE = Special exempt
- JE = Junior exempt
- JR = Junior Accelerator Programme entrant
- CO = College Accelerator Programme entrant
- NG = Next Gen Accelerator Program entrant
- w/o = Walkover
- r = Retired
- d = Defaulted

=== Finals ===
Semifinals
1	**(France) Yannick Noah**	3	**6**	**6**
(Czechoslovakia) Stanislav Birner	**6**	3	4
(West Germany) Michael Westphal	**6**	1	4
2	**(Czechoslovakia) Tomáš Šmíd**	3	**6**	**6**

Final
1	**(France) Yannick Noah**	**6**	**6**
2	(Czechoslovakia) Tomáš Šmíd	3	2

=== Top half ===
First round
1	**(France) Yannick Noah**	**6**	**6**
(France) Paul Torre	2	2
**(Austria) Robert Reininger**	**7**	**6**
(West Germany) Klaus Eberhard	5	4
**(South Africa) Freddie Sauer**	**6**	**6**
(Spain) JA Rodriguez Aransay	2	3
5	**(Sweden) Anders Järryd**	**6**	**6**
(Netherlands) Louk Sanders	1	4
4	**(Sweden) Hans Simonsson**	**6**	3	**6**
(West Germany) Christoph Zipf	2	**6**	4
**(Czechoslovakia) Stanislav Birner**	**6**	**6**
(West Germany) Hans-Dieter Beutel	2	0
**(France) Jean-Louis Haillet**	3	**7**	**7**
(France) Christophe Bernelle	**6**	5	5
**(Sweden) Magnus Tideman**	4	**6**	**6**
7	(France) Thierry Tulasne	**6**	2	1

Second round
1	**(France) Y Noah**	**7**	1	**6**
(Austria) R Reininger	5	**6**	1
(South Africa) F Sauer	3	5
5	**(Sweden) A Järryd**	**6**	**7**
4	(Sweden) H Simonsson	0	3
**(Czechoslovakia) S Birner**	**6**	**6**
(France) J-L Haillet	1	3
**(Sweden) M Tideman**	**6**	**6**

Quarterfinals
1	**(France) Y Noah**	**6**	**6**
5	(Sweden) A Järryd	4	4
**(Czechoslovakia) S Birner**	**6**	**6**
(Sweden) M Tideman	3	3

Semifinals
1	**(France) Y Noah**	3	**6**	**6**
(Czechoslovakia) S Birner	**6**	3	4

=== Bottom half ===
First round
6	**(United States) Bill Scanlon**	**6**	**6**
(France) Jean-Marc Piacentile	0	1
**(West Germany) Michael Westphal**	**6**	**7**
(Socialist Federal Republic of Yugoslavia) Slobodan Živojinović	0	6
**(West Germany) Jaromir Becka**	**6**	**6**
(Czechoslovakia) Jiří Granát	4	3
3	**(Israel) Shlomo Glickstein**	3	**6**	**6**
(France) Georges Goven	**6**	3	2
8	**(Sweden) Stefan Simonsson**	**6**	**6**
(Spain) Miguel Mir	2	1
**(France) Jérôme Potier**	**6**	**6**
(Sweden) Jan Gunnarsson	0	2
**(Switzerland) Jakob Hlasek**	**6**	3	**6**
(Romania) Ilie Năstase	4	**6**	3
2	**(Czechoslovakia) Tomáš Šmíd**	**6**	**6**
(Sweden) Joakim Nyström	1	4

Second round
6	(United States) B Scanlon	4	3
**(West Germany) M Westphal**	**6**	**6**
(West Germany) J Becka	5	5
3	**(Israel) S Glickstein**	**7**	**7**
8	**(Sweden) S Simonsson**	**6**	**7**
(France) J Potier	2	5
(Switzerland) J Hlasek	2	**7**	4
2	**(Czechoslovakia) T Šmíd**	**6**	6	**6**

Quarterfinals
**(West Germany) M Westphal**	**6**	**6**
3	(Israel) S Glickstein	1	2
8	(Sweden) S Simonsson	0	2
2	**(Czechoslovakia) T Šmíd**	**6**	**6**

Semifinals
(West Germany) M Westphal	**6**	1	4
2	**(Czechoslovakia) T Šmíd**	3	**6**	**6**
