= Mark Dickson (tennis) =

American tennis player (born 1959)

- Country (sports): United States
- Residence: Miami, Florida
- Born: 8 December 1959 (age 66) Tampa, Florida, United States
- Height: 6 ft 3 in (1.91 m)
- Turned pro: 1982
- Retired: 1988
- Plays: Right-handed
- Prize money: $686,138

Singles
- Career record: 128–119
- Career titles: 2
- Highest ranking: No. 32 (4 March 1985)

Grand Slam singles results
- Australian Open: 3R (1983)
- French Open: 2R (1983)
- Wimbledon: 2R (1984)
- US Open: QF (1983)

Doubles
- Career record: 116–117
- Career titles: 4
- Highest ranking: No. 23 (19 September 1983)

Grand Slam doubles results
- Australian Open: QF (1985)
- French Open: 3R (1985)
- Wimbledon: 2R (1983, 1984)
- US Open: QF (1983)

Mark Dickson (born 8 December 1959) is a former professional tennis player.

Playing college tennis at Clemson University, Dickson was selected as the 1982 ITCA Senior Player of the Year. Additionally, he was named All-American in singles in 1980, 1981 and 1982. In 1981 he was also named All-American in doubles. Dickson turned pro in 1982 after becoming the first three-time All-America at Clemson University from 1980 to 1982.

As a tour pro, Dickson is best known for being a quarter-finalist in the 1983 US Open where he defeated Stefan Simonsson, Mel Purcell, Danie Visser and John Lloyd before losing to compatriot Bill Scanlon. He captured two grand prix tour titles, at Houston and Toulouse.

Born in Tampa, Florida, Dickson graduated from Jesuit High School in 1978. He lived in Sarasota, Florida while on tour.

== Career finals ==
=== Singles (2 titles, 1 runner-up) ===
Result	W/L	Date	Tournament	Surface	Opponent	Score
Loss	0–1	Mar 1983	Munich, West Germany	Carpet (i)	(United States) Brian Teacher	6–1, 4–6, 2–6, 3–6
Win	1–1	Apr 1984	Houston, U.S.	Clay	(United States) Sammy Giammalva Jr.	6–3, 6–2
Win	2–1	Nov 1984	Toulouse, France	Hard (i)	(Switzerland) Heinz Günthardt	7–6^{(7–2)}, 6–4

=== Doubles (4 titles, 5 runner-ups) ===
Result	W/L	Date	Tournament	Surface	Partner	Opponents	Score
Loss	0–1	Oct 1982	Vienna, Austria	Carpet (i)	(United States) Terry Moor	(France) Henri Leconte (Czechoslovakia) Pavel Složil	1–6, 6–7
Win	1–1	Nov 1982	Stockholm, Sweden	Hard (i)	(Sweden) Jan Gunnarsson	(United States) Sherwood Stewart (United States) Ferdi Taygan	7–6, 6–7, 6–4
Loss	1–2	Apr 1983	Houston WCT, U.S.	Clay	(Czechoslovakia) Tomáš Šmíd	(South Africa) Kevin Curren (United States) Steve Denton	6–7, 7–6, 1–6
Win	2–2	Jul 1983	Boston, U.S.	Clay	(Brazil) Cássio Motta	(Chile) Hans Gildemeister (Chile) Belus Prajoux	7–5, 6–3
Win	3–2	Jul 1983	Washington, D.C., U.S.	Clay	(Brazil) Cássio Motta	(Australia) Paul McNamee (United States) Ferdi Taygan	6–2, 1–6, 6–4
Win	4–2	May 1984	Firenze, Italy	Clay	(United States) Chip Hooper	(South Africa) Bernard Mitton (United States) Butch Walts	7–6, 4–6, 7–5
Loss	4–3	Sep 1984	Honolulu, U.S.	Carpet	(United States) Mike Leach	(United States) Gary Donnelly (United States) Butch Walts	6–7, 4–6
Loss	4–4	Oct 1984	Tokyo, Japan	Hard	(United States) Steve Meister	(United States) David Dowlen (Nigeria) Nduka Odizor	7–6, 4–6, 3–6
Loss	4–5	Oct 1985	Basel, Switzerland	Hard (i)	(United States) Tim Wilkison	(United States) Tim Gullikson (United States) Tom Gullikson	6–4, 4–6, 4–6
