= 1983 Swedish Open =

- Date: 11–17 July
- Edition: 36th
- Category: Grand Prix
- Draw: 32S / 16D
- Prize money: $75,000
- Surface: Clay / outdoor
- Location: Båstad, Sweden

Champions

Singles
- (Sweden) Mats Wilander

Doubles
- (Sweden) Joakim Nyström / (Sweden) Mats Wilander
← 1982 ·	Swedish Open	· 1984 →

The 1983 Swedish Open was a men's tennis tournament played on outdoor clay courts held in Båstad, Sweden and was part of the Grand Prix circuit of the 1983 Tour. It was the 36th edition of the tournament and was held from 11 July through 17 July 1983. First-seeded Mats Wilander won the singles title.

== Finals ==
=== Singles ===
(Sweden) Mats Wilander defeated (Sweden) Anders Järryd 6–1, 6–2

- It was Wilander's 4th singles title of the year and the 8th of his career.

=== Doubles ===
(Sweden) Joakim Nyström / (Sweden) Mats Wilander defeated (Sweden) Anders Järryd / (Sweden) Hans Simonsson 1–6, 7–6^{(7–4)}, 7–6^{(7–4)}
