= 1982 Grand Prix de Tennis de Toulouse =

Tennis tournament

- Date: 6–12 December
- Edition: 1st
- Category: Grand Prix
- Draw: 32S / 16D
- Prize money: $75,000
- Surface: Carpet / indoor
- Location: Toulouse, France

Champions

Singles
- (France) Yannick Noah

Doubles
- (Czechoslovakia) Pavel Složil / (Czechoslovakia) Tomáš Šmíd
- Grand Prix de Tennis de Toulouse

The 1982 Grand Prix de Tennis de Toulouse was a men's tennis tournament played on indoor carpet courts in Toulouse, France that was part of the Grand Prix series of the 1982 Grand Prix tennis circuit. It was the first edition of the tournament and was held from 6 December until 12 December 1982. First-seeded Yannick Noah won the singles title.

== Finals ==
=== Singles ===
(France) Yannick Noah defeated (Czechoslovakia) Tomáš Šmíd, 6–3, 6–2

- It was Noah's 4th and last singles title of the year and the 11th of his career.

=== Doubles ===
(Czechoslovakia) Pavel Složil / (Czechoslovakia) Tomáš Šmíd defeated (France) Jean-Louis Haillet / (France) Yannick Noah, 6–4, 6–4
