= 1984 Swedish Open =

- Date: 16–22 July
- Edition: 37th
- Category: Grand Prix
- Draw: 32S / 16D
- Prize money: $75,000
- Surface: Clay / outdoor
- Location: Båstad, Sweden

Champions

Singles
- (Sweden) Henrik Sundström

Doubles
- (Sweden) Jan Gunnarsson / (Denmark) Michael Mortensen
- Swedish Open

The 1984 Swedish Open was a men's tennis tournament played on outdoor clay courts held in Båstad, Sweden and was part of the Grand Prix circuit of the 1984 Tour. It was the 37th edition of the tournament and was held from 16 July through 22 July 1984. Second-seeded Henrik Sundström won the singles title.

== Finals ==
=== Singles ===
(Sweden) Henrik Sundström defeated (Sweden) Anders Järryd 3–6, 7–5, 6–3

- It was Sundström's 3rd singles title of the year and the 4th of his career.

=== Doubles ===
(Sweden) Jan Gunnarsson / (Denmark) Michael Mortensen defeated (Spain) Juan Avendaño / (Brazil) Fernando Roese 6–0, 6–0
