= Guillermo Stevens =

Mexican tennis player and coach

- Full name: Guillermo Stevens Sierra
- Country (sports): Mexico
- Born: 22 April 1960 (age 64); Veracruz, Mexico
- Height: 5 ft 11 in (180 cm)

Singles
- Career record: 0–1
- Highest ranking: No. 302 (22 Dec 1980)

Grand Slam singles results
- Wimbledon: Q1 (1983)

Doubles
- Career record: 1–4
- Highest ranking: No. 345 (19 Nov 1984)

Grand Slam doubles results
- Wimbledon: Q1 (1983)

Guillermo Stevens Sierra (born 22 April 1960) is a Mexican tennis coach and former professional player. He is also known by his nickname "Memo".

Stevens was a collegiate tennis player for UT Austin prior to joining the professional tour, where he attained a career high ranking of 302 in the world. He was runner-up at the inaugural San Luis Potosí Challenger in 1980, qualified for the main draw of the 1982 Bordeaux Open and featured in the qualifiers for the 1983 Wimbledon Championships.
