= 1982 Bordeaux Open =

- Date: 21–26 September
- Edition: 4th
- Category: Grand Prix
- Draw: 32S / 16D
- Prize money: $75,000
- Surface: Clay / outdoor
- Location: Bordeaux, France
- Venue: Villa Primrose

Champions

Singles
- (Chile) Hans Gildemeister

Doubles
- (Chile) Hans Gildemeister / (Ecuador) Andrés Gómez
- Bordeaux Open

The 1982 Bordeaux Open also known as the Grand Prix Passing Shot was a men's tennis tournament played on outdoor clay courts at Villa Primrose in Bordeaux, France that was part of the 1982 Volvo Grand Prix. It was the fourth edition of the tournament and was held from 23 September until 26 September 1982. The tournament changed all matches to best of three sets. Fourth-seeded Hans Gildemeister won the singles title.

== Finals ==
=== Singles ===
(Chile) Hans Gildemeister defeated (Peru) Pablo Arraya 7–5, 6–1

- It was Gildemeister's 1st singles title of the year and the 4th and last of his career.

=== Doubles ===
(Chile) Hans Gildemeister / (Ecuador) Andrés Gómez defeated (Sweden) Anders Järryd / (Sweden) Hans Simonsson 6–4, 6–2
