= Juan Carlos Yunis =

Argentine tennis player

- Country (sports): Argentina
- Born: 17 January 1960 (age 65)

Singles
- Career record: 0–1
- Highest ranking: No. 423 (22 Dec 1980)

Doubles
- Career record: 4–19
- Highest ranking: No. 219 (10 Sep 1984)
Medal record
Southern Cross Games
Gold medal – first place	1978 La Paz	Mixed doubles
Bronze medal – third place	1978 La Paz	Men's doubles

Juan Carlos Yunis (born 17 January 1960) is an Argentine former professional tennis player.

A gold medalist at the 1978 Southern Cross Games, Yunis made his only Grand Prix main draw singles appearance at the 1982 Bordeaux Open, but competed more regularly as a doubles player. While partnering his younger brother Francisco Yunis, he was a losing doubles finalist at Bordeaux in 1983.

Yunis is now a resident of Switzerland.

== Grand Prix career finals ==
=== Doubles: 1 (0–1) ===
Result	W/L	Date	Tournament	Surface	Partner	Opponents	Score
Loss	0–1	Sep 1983	Bordeaux, France	Clay	(Argentina) Francisco Yunis	(Sweden) Stefan Simonsson (Sweden) Magnus Tideman	4–6, 2–6
