= Scott Lipton =

American tennis player (born 1959)

- Scott Lipton at the 1980 Ojai Tennis Tournament
- Full name: Scott Myers-Lipton
- Country (sports): United States
- Born: September 15, 1959 (age 67) Palo Alto, California, U.S.
- Plays: Left-handed

Singles
- Career record: 6–14
- Highest ranking: No. 105 (September 12, 1983)

Grand Slam singles results
- US Open: 2R (1983)

Doubles
- Career record: 2–4
- Highest ranking: No. 375 (January 2, 1984)

Scott Myers-Lipton (born September 15, 1959) is a sociologist and a former professional tennis player. He is professor emeritus at San José State University after 24 years of teaching. Myers-Lipton's research focused on understanding and exploring democracy, inequality and power structures through advocacy and social action campaigns.

== Biography ==
=== Tennis career ===
A left-handed player from San Jose, California, Lipton won the Central Coast Section (CCS) in high school and the Northern California Sectionals in the Boys 18s in 1977. He went on to become a three-time all-American athlete at the University of San Diego, before competing on the professional tour from 1981 to 1984.

Lipton was twice featured in the main draw of the US Open. In 1982 he lost a fifth-set tiebreak to Vincent Van Patten in the opening round. After returning in 1983, he won his first-round match in five sets over Jim Gurfein, but fell in the second round to Aaron Krickstein. Lipton finished 2nd overall on the Dutch Satellite Tour in 1980 as an amateur, and captured a singles Satellite Tournament in Varna, Bulgaria in 1981.

He reached his best ranking of #105 in the world in 1983. His best performance on the Grand Prix Circuit was a semi-final appearance at the 1983 Swedish Open, where he beat world #7 Henrik Sundström in the quarter-finals.

=== Academia ===
Scott Myers-Lipton was a professor of Sociology at San José State University (SJSU) from 1999 to 2023. Now professor emeritus of Sociology at SJSU, Dr. Myers-Lipton is the author of five books, including:

- CHANGE! A Student Guide to Social Action (2023, Routledge, 2nd edition);
- CHANGE! A Guide to Teaching Social Action (2022, Routledge);
- Ending Extreme Inequality: An Economic Bill of Rights Approach to Eliminate Poverty (2015, Routledge);
- Rebuild America: Solving the Economic Crisis through Civic Work (2010, Paradigm);
- Social Solutions to Poverty: America’s Struggle to Build a Just Society (2006, Paradigm).

In addition, Dr. Myers-Lipton was the lead author from 2020-2025 of the Silicon Valley Pain Index and the author of Racial and Social Justice at San José State University. Dr. Myers-Lipton also served as an Advisory Board Member of the Human Rights Institute at SJSU from 2019-2025. Currently, he is the Director of Teaching Social Action.

In his work as a public intellectual, Myers-Lipton was the faculty advisor to his students' successful effort to raise the minimum wage in San José from $8 to $10. He also advised on the Gulf Coast Civic Works Campaign, an initiative to develop 100,000 prevailing wage jobs for local and displaced workers after Hurricane Katrina. In the 1990 and 2000s, he helped SJSU students develop solutions to poverty by taking them to live at homeless shelters, the Navajo and Lakota nations, the Gulf Coast, and Kingston, Jamaica. For over 17 years, Scott taught a social action course at SJSU. Social action is unique in that it is designed to do democracy; instead of just reading about social change, students learn about power and democracy by launching and working on campaigns to change a policy. Myers-Lipton is working with Bobby Hackett at the Bonner Foundation to mainstream teaching social action across the country on college campuses (https://www.bonner.org/social-action-course-initiative-launched). Below is a list of some of the victories that social action students have had at San José State:

- in 2020, got the SJSU President to agree to develop a 12-emergency bed program and $2 million rental assistance program for houseless students; https://sanfrancisco.cbslocal.com/video/4422900-officials-unveil-plan-for-affordable-housing-for-san-jose-state-students/in
- in 2019, got Santa Clara County to clear and expunge 13,000 cannabis convictions: https://sanjosespotlight.com/student-activists-celebrate-countys-cannabis-conviction-clearance/
- in 2017, convinced the SJSU President to agree to rejoin the Workers Rights Consortium, ensuring SJSU apparel is not made in sweatshops; https://www.youtube.com/watch?v=JehGpi88oYAin
- in 2015, got the SJSU President to agree to install air conditioning in a 70-year-old building where several students had fainted due to heat exhaustion; https://www.facebook.com/StudentsforDMH/in
- in 2014, convinced the SJSU President to remove a Tower Foundation board member, after she made a racist comment about Latinas; www.nbcbayarea.com/news/local/san-jose-state-university-students-protest-board-members-alleged-racist-statement/78156
- in 2012, developed and led the Measure D campaign in the 2012 election, raising San Jose's minimum wage from $8 to $10 an hour, and then pushing it to $15; https://news.yahoo.com/student-class-project-leads-minimum-163959852.html

In addition, Myers-Lipton was a member of “Commemorating A Legacy Project Committee” at SJSU, which developed the Tommie Smith and John Carlos statues. After the statues were erected, Myers-Lipton founded the “Ad Hoc Tommie Smith and John Carlos Committee” since the university was not planning to commemorate October 16, the day they raised their fists in Mexico City. For 17 years, Myers-Lipton ensured there was a campus event to commemorate this day (https://blogs.sjsu.edu/coss/2018/10/01/tommie-smith-and-john-carlos/comment-page-1). In addition, he suggested the idea to give honorary doctorates to Tommie and John, and wrote part of the language to the CSU Chancellor's Office in this successful effort. More recently, Scott led the effort to have October 16th declared by the City Council, "Smith-Carlos Day" in San José, with the City committing itself, along with SJSU, "in educating the San José community about this historic action through events, speakers, and other actions every October 16th."

As a public intellectual, Myers-Lipton felt compelled to respond to the murder of George Floyd and Ahmaud Arbery, and the shooting of Breonna Taylor, and the global uprising that took place. In response, Myers-Lipton created the Silicon Valley Pain Index, which has been published annually since 2020 by the SJSU Human Rights Institute. This annual report is a meta-analysis of recent studies exploring institutionalized racism in Silicon Valley.

Myers-Lipton is the recipient of the Manuel Vega Latino Empowerment Award, San José/Silicon Valley NAACP Social Justice Award, the Elbert Reed Award from the Dr. Martin Luther King Jr. Association of Santa Clara County, the Changer Maker Award from the Silicon Valley Council of Non-Profits, the Teaching Effectiveness Award from the SJSU College of Social Sciences, and the SJSU Distinguished Service Award.

Scott lives with his wife, Diane, in the Bay Area. He has two children.
