= Francisco Yunis =

Argentine tennis player

- Country (sports): Argentina
- Residence: Barcelona, Spain
- Born: 12 August 1964 (age 60); Buenos Aires, Argentina
- Height: 1.90 m (6 ft 3 in)
- Turned pro: 1982
- Retired: 1994
- Plays: Right-handed (one-handed backhand)
- Prize money: $198,607

Singles
- Career record: 27–40
- Highest ranking: No. 61 (30 March 1987)

Grand Slam singles results
- French Open: 3R (1987)
- US Open: 1R (1987)

Doubles
- Career record: 6–23
- Highest ranking: No. 232 (16 July 1984)

Francisco Yunis (born 12 August 1964) is a former professional tennis player from Argentina.

== Career ==
Partnering his brother Juan Carlos, Yunis was a losing doubles finalist at Bordeaux in 1983. En route they defeated the top seeded pairing of Pablo Arraya and Victor Pecci, Sr.

The Argentine appeared at two Grand Slam tournaments in 1987. In the French Open he had straight set wins over Gilad Bloom and Loïc Courteau, to make the third round, where he lost to 11th seed Kent Carlsson. He lost to Jim Pugh in the opening round of the US Open. Also that year, Yunis was a semi-finalist in Athens.

Yunis beat qualifier Eduardo Osta in the opening round of the 1988 French Open, but was then eliminated from the tournament by eventual champion Mats Wilander.

He made the semifinals at Geneva in 1989 and was a quarterfinalist at Florence in 1992.

== Grand Prix career finals ==
=== Doubles: 1 (0–1) ===
Result	W/L	Date	Tournament	Surface	Partner	Opponents	Score
Loss	0–1	Sep 1983	Bordeaux, France	Clay	(Argentina) Juan Carlos Yunis	(Sweden) Stefan Simonsson (Sweden) Magnus Tideman	4–6, 2–6
