= Christophe Lesage =

French tennis player

- Country (sports): France
- Born: 17 November 1962 (age 62)

Singles
- Career record: 1–3
- Highest ranking: No. 393 (15 Sep 1986)

Grand Slam singles results
- Wimbledon: Q1 (1981)

Doubles
- Career record: 3–13
- Highest ranking: No. 193 (6 Jul 1987)

Grand Slam doubles results
- French Open: 1R (1980)

Grand Slam mixed doubles results
- French Open: 2R (1987)

Christophe Lesage (born 17 November 1962) is a French former professional tennis player.

Active on tour in the 1980s, Lesage reached a career best singles ranking of 393. He featured in the qualifying draw for the 1981 Wimbledon Championships and made the second round of a Grand Prix tournament in Bordeaux in 1982. As a doubles player he was ranked as high as 193 in the world and appeared in the main draw of the French Open.

Lesage founded the "National Tennis Cup", which is the largest amateur tournament in France.

== Challenger finals ==
=== Doubles: 1 (0–1) ===
Result	No.	Date	Tournament	Surface	Partner	Opponents	Score
Loss	1.	Jul 1987	Clermont-Ferrand, France	Clay	(France) J-M Piacentile	(Iran) Mansour Bahrami (Switzerland) Claudio Mezzadri	3–6, 5–7
