= Jaromir Becka =

Czechoslovak tennis player

- Full name: Jaromir Becka
- Country (sports): West Germany
- Born: 6 July 1963 (age 63) Prague, Czechoslovakia
- Plays: Right-handed
- Prize money: $48,013

Singles
- Career record: 13–18
- Career titles: 0
- Highest ranking: No. 137 (21 May 1984)

Doubles
- Career record: 9–11
- Career titles: 0
- Highest ranking: No. 147 (13 June 1988)

Jaromir Becka (born 6 July 1963) is a Czechoslovak born former professional tennis player from Germany.

== Biography ==
Originally from Prague in what was then Czechoslovakia, Becka emigrated to West Germany and was based in Pullach, Munich. He was the Munich Junior Champion in 1980, then in 1981 was the National Indoor Junior Champion and a member of the Valeria Cup team.

Becka made the quarter-finals of two Grand Prix tournaments in 1983, the Tel Aviv Open and Grand Prix de Tennis de Toulouse. Also that year he came close to beating Vitas Gerulaitis at the Munich WCT tournament. After winning the first set comfortably, he lost the next two in tiebreaks.

In 1984 he reached the quarter-finals of the Bavarian International Tennis Championships and had a win over Roscoe Tanner in Cleveland.

He won two titles on the Challenger circuit, both in doubles, at Thessaloniki in 1986 and Heilbronn in 1988.

Formerly a coach of Carsten Arriens, Becka now runs a tennis school in Munich.

== Challenger titles ==
=== Doubles: (2) ===
No.	Year	Tournament	Surface	Partner	Opponents	Score
1.	1986	Thessaloniki, Greece	Hard	(West Germany) Christian Saceanu	(Austria) Alex Antonitsch (South Africa) Brian Levine	3–6, 6–1, 7–6
2.	1988	Heilbronn, Germany	Carpet	(West Germany) Udo Riglewski	(West Germany) Axel Hornung (West Germany) Andreas Lesch	7–6, 4–6, 6–2
