= Hans Gildemeister =

Chilean tennis player

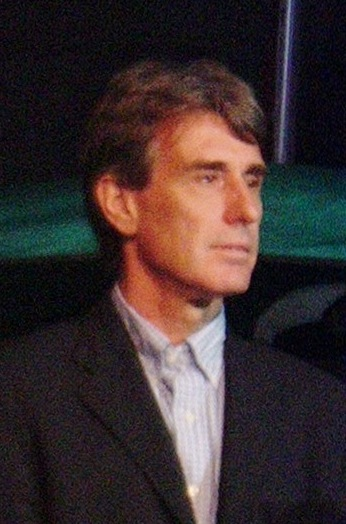
- Gildemeister in 2004
- Full name: Hans Gildemeister Bohner
- Country (sports): Chile
- Residence: Santiago, Chile
- Born: 9 February 1956 (age 70) Lima, Peru
- Height: 1.83 m (6 ft 0 in)
- Turned pro: 1973
- Retired: 1987
- Plays: Right-handed (two-handed both sides)
- Prize money: $740,858

Singles
- Career record: 194–142
- Career titles: 4
- Highest ranking: No. 12 (22 February 1980)

Grand Slam singles results
- French Open: QF (1978, 1979, 1980)
- Wimbledon: 2R (1977)
- US Open: 2R (1977)

Doubles
- Career record: 251–126
- Career titles: 23
- Highest ranking: No. 5 (27 April 1987)

Grand Slam doubles results
- French Open: F (1982)
- Wimbledon: 2R (1977)
- US Open: 3R (1977)

Other doubles tournaments
- Tour Finals: RR (1986)

Hans Gildemeister Bohner (born Juan Pedro Gildemeister Bohner on 9 February 1956), is a Chilean former tennis player of German ancestry, who won four singles and 23 doubles titles during his professional career. The right-hander reached his highest singles ATP ranking on 22 February 1980, when he became world No. 12.

He is a former captain of the Chilean Davis Cup team.

== Personal life ==
Gildemeister was born in Lima, Peru, to Peruvian-German parents and moved to Chile at the age of two. His father, Benito, owned a printing house and his mother, Elena, was a German teacher. He has four siblings.

He naturalized Chilean by residence in 1978.

He is the brother of Heinz and Fritz Gildemeister, also pro tennis players, and was brother-in-law of Laura Gildemeister, who was also a tennis player.

He has lived in Tampa, Florida, United States.

== Grand Slam finals ==
=== Doubles (1 runner-up) ===
Result	Year	Championship	Surface	Partner	Opponents	Score
Loss	1982	French Open	Clay	(Chile) Belus Prajoux	(United States) Sherwood Stewart (United States) Ferdi Taygan	5–7, 3–6, 1–1 ret.

== Career finals ==
=== Singles: 6 (4 wins / 2 losses) ===
Result	W-L	Date	Tournament	Surface	Opponent	Score
Loss	0–1	Aug 1979	Boston, US	Clay	(Spain) José Higueras	3–6, 1–6
Win	1–1	Oct 1979	Barcelona, Spain	Clay	(United States) Eddie Dibbs	6–4, 6–3, 6–1
Win	2–1	Dec 1979	Santiago, Chile	Clay	(Spain) José Higueras	7–5, 5–7, 6–4
Loss	2–2	Jul 1981	Boston, US	Clay	(Argentina) José Luis Clerc	6–0, 2–6, 2–6
Win	3–2	Nov 1981	Santiago, Chile	Clay	(Ecuador) Andrés Gómez	6–4, 7–5
Win	4–2	Sep 1982	Bordeaux, France	Clay	(Peru) Pablo Arraya	7–5, 6–1

=== Doubles: 35 (24 wins / 11 losses) ===
Result	W-L	Date	Tournament	Surface	Partner	Opponents	Score
Win	1–0	Dec 1976	Santiago, Chile	Clay	(Chile) Patricio Cornejo	(Argentina) Lito Álvarez (Chile) Belus Prajoux	6–3, 7–6
Loss	1–1	Apr 1977	Murcia, Spain	Clay	(Chile) Patricio Cornejo	(France) Patrice Dominguez (France) François Jauffret	5–7, 2–6
Win	2–1	Nov 1977	Bogotá, Colombia	Clay	(Chile) Belus Prajoux	(Venezuela) Jorge Andrew (Brazil) Carlos Kirmayr	6–4, 6–2
Loss	2–2	Jun 1978	Berlin, Germany	Clay	(Socialist Federal Republic of Yugoslavia) Željko Franulović	(Switzerland) Colin Dowdeswell (West Germany) Jürgen Fassbender	3–6, 4–6
Win	3–2	Oct 1978	Barcelona, Spain	Clay	(Socialist Federal Republic of Yugoslavia) Željko Franulović	(France) Jean-Louis Haillet (France) Gilles Moretton	6–1, 6–4
Loss	3–3	Nov 1978	Bogotá, Colombia	Clay	(Paraguay) Víctor Pecci	(Chile) Jaime Fillol (Chile) Álvaro Fillol	4–6, 3–6
Win	4–3	Dec 1978	Santiago, Chile	Clay	(Paraguay) Víctor Pecci	(Chile) Jaime Fillol (Chile) Álvaro Fillol	6–4, 6–3
Win	5–3	May 1980	Hamburg, Germany	Clay	(Ecuador) Andrés Gómez	(West Germany) Reinhart Probst (West Germany) Max Wünschig	6–3, 6–4
Loss	5–4	Jul 1980	Boston, US	Clay	(Ecuador) Andrés Gómez	(United States) Gene Mayer (United States) Sandy Mayer	6–1, 4–6, 4–6
Win	6–4	Jul 1980	Washington DC., US	Clay	(Ecuador) Andrés Gómez	(United States) Gene Mayer (United States) Sandy Mayer	6–4, 7–5
Win	7–4	Oct 1980	Madrid, Spain	Clay	(Ecuador) Andrés Gómez	(Czechoslovakia) Jan Kodeš (Hungary) Balázs Taróczy	3–6, 6–3, 10–8
Win	8–4	Nov 1980	Quito, Ecuador	Clay	(Ecuador) Andrés Gómez	(Argentina) José Luis Clerc (Chile) Belus Prajoux	6–3, 1–6, 6–4
Win	9–4	May 1981	Hamburg, Germany	Clay	(Ecuador) Andrés Gómez	(Australia) Peter McNamara (Australia) Paul McNamee	6–4, 3–6, 6–4
Win	10–4	May 1981	Rome Masters, Italy	Clay	(Ecuador) Andrés Gómez	(United States) Bruce Manson (Czechoslovakia) Tomáš Šmíd	7–5, 6–2
Loss	10–5	Jul 1981	Boston, US	Clay	(Ecuador) Andrés Gómez	(Mexico) Raúl Ramírez (Czechoslovakia) Pavel Složil	4–6, 6–7
Win	11–5	Oct 1981	Madrid, Spain	Clay	(Ecuador) Andrés Gómez	(Switzerland) Heinz Günthardt (Czechoslovakia) Tomáš Šmíd	6–2, 3–6, 6–3
Loss	11–6	Oct 1981	Barcelona, Spain	Clay	(Ecuador) Andrés Gómez	(Sweden) Anders Järryd (Sweden) Hans Simonsson	1–6, 4–6
Win	12–6	Nov 1981	Quito, Ecuador	Clay	(Ecuador) Andrés Gómez	(Australia) David Carter (Ecuador) Ricardo Ycaza	7–5, 6–3
Win	13–6	Nov 1981	Santiago, Chile	Clay	(Ecuador) Andrés Gómez	(Argentina) Ricardo Cano (Chile) Belus Prajoux	6–2, 7–6
Loss	13–7	May 1982	French Open, Paris	Clay	(Chile) Belus Prajoux	(United States) Sherwood Stewart (United States) Ferdi Taygan	5–7, 3–6, 1–1 ret.
Loss	13–8	Jul 1982	Washington DC., US	Clay	(Ecuador) Andrés Gómez	(Mexico) Raúl Ramírez (United States) Van Winitsky	5–7, 6–7
Win	14–8	Sep 1982	Bordeaux, France	Clay	(Ecuador) Andrés Gómez	(Sweden) Anders Järryd (Sweden) Hans Simonsson	6–4, 6–2
Win	15–8	Feb 1983	Viña del Mar, Chile	Clay	(Chile) Belus Prajoux	(Brazil) Júlio Góes (Brazil) Ney Keller	6–3, 6–1
Loss	15–9	Jul 1983	Boston, US	Clay	(Chile) Belus Prajoux	(United States) Mark Dickson (Brazil) Cássio Motta	5–7, 3–6
Loss	15–10	Apr 1984	Nice, France	Clay	(Ecuador) Andrés Gómez	(Sweden) Jan Gunnarsson (Denmark) Michael Mortensen	1–6, 5–7
Win	16–10	Apr 1985	Hamburg, West Germany	Clay	(Ecuador) Andrés Gómez	(Switzerland) Heinz Günthardt (Hungary) Balázs Taróczy	1–6, 7–6, 6–4
Win	17–10	Jul 1985	Washington DC., US	Clay	(Paraguay) Víctor Pecci	(Australia) David Graham (Hungary) Balázs Taróczy	6–3, 1–6, 6–4
Win	18–10	Apr 1986	Indianapolis, US	Clay	(Ecuador) Andrés Gómez	(Australia) John Fitzgerald (United States) Sherwood Stewart	6–4, 6–3
Win	19–10	May 1986	Forest Hills, US	Clay	(Ecuador) Andrés Gómez	(West Germany) Boris Becker (Socialist Federal Republic of Yugoslavia) Slobodan Živojinović	7–6, 7–6
Win	20–10	Jul 1986	Boston, US	Clay	(Ecuador) Andrés Gómez	(United States) Dan Cassidy (United States) Mel Purcell	4–6, 7–5, 6–0
Win	21–10	Jul 1986	Washington, D.C., US	Clay	(Ecuador) Andrés Gómez	(Brazil) Ricardo Acioly (Brazil) César Kist	6–3, 7–5
Loss	21–11	Aug 1986	Kitzbühel, Austria	Clay	(Ecuador) Andrés Gómez	(Switzerland) Heinz Günthardt (Czechoslovakia) Tomáš Šmíd	6–4, 3–6, 6–7
Win	22–11	Sep 1986	Stuttgart, West Germany	Clay	(Ecuador) Andrés Gómez	(Iran) Mansour Bahrami (Uruguay) Diego Pérez	6–4, 6–3
Win	23–11	Apr 1987	Monte Carlo, Monaco	Clay	(Ecuador) Andrés Gómez	(Iran) Mansour Bahrami (Denmark) Michael Mortensen	6–2, 6–4
Win	24–11	Jul 1987	Boston, US	Clay	(Ecuador) Andrés Gómez	(Sweden) Joakim Nyström (Sweden) Mats Wilander	7–6, 3–6, 6–1
