= Magnus Tideman =

Swedish tennis player

- Country (sports): Sweden
- Residence: Uppsala, Sweden
- Born: 9 April 1963 (age 63) Uppsala, Sweden
- Height: 1.93 m (6 ft 4 in)
- Turned pro: 1980
- Retired: 1989
- Plays: Right-handed
- Prize money: $134,531

Singles
- Career record: 14–35
- Career titles: 0
- Highest ranking: No. 76 (21 March 1983)

Grand Slam singles results
- Australian Open: 2R (1988)
- French Open: 3R (1983)
- Wimbledon: 1R (1983)

Doubles
- Career record: 51–66
- Career titles: 1
- Highest ranking: No. 43 (22 February 1988)

Grand Slam doubles results
- Australian Open: QF (1988)
- French Open: 2R (1983, 1985, 1986)
- Wimbledon: 1R (1983, 1986, 1987, 1988)

Grand Slam mixed doubles results
- Wimbledon: 2R (1986, 1988)

Magnus Tideman (born 9 April 1963) is a former professional tennis player from Sweden. He won one doubles title and achieved a career-high of World No. 43 in 1988. In singles, he reached the quarterfinals of Toulouse in 1982 (defeating Thierry Tulasne en route) and achieved a career-high ranking of World No. 76 in 1983. Tideman also defeated Manuel Orantes at the 1983 French Open.

After retiring from tennis, he became a tennis coach. He was the coach of Aryna Sabalenka, Thomas Johansson, Jeremy Chardy and Radu Albot. He is currently coaching at the Piatti Tennis Center.

== Career finals ==
=== Doubles (1 win) ===
Result	W/L	Date	Tournament	Surface	Partner	Opponents	Score
Win	1–0	Sep 1983	Bordeaux, France	Clay	(Sweden) Stefan Simonsson	(Argentina) Francisco Yunis (Argentina) Juan Carlos Yunis	6–4, 6–2
Loss	1–1	Jul 1987	Stuttgart Outdoor, Germany	Clay	(Sweden) Mikael Pernfors	(United States) Rick Leach (United States) Tim Pawsat	3–6, 4–6
