= Stefan Simonsson =

Swedish tennis player (born 1960)

- Country (sports): Sweden
- Residence: Säffle, Sweden
- Born: 5 January 1960 (age 66) Hyltebruk, Sweden
- Height: 1.75 m (5 ft 9 in)
- Plays: Right-handed
- Prize money: $278 086

Singles
- Career record: 100–124
- Career titles: 0
- Highest ranking: No. 48 (23 May 1983)

Grand Slam singles results
- Australian Open: 4R (1984)
- French Open: 1R (1980, 1983, 1984, 1985)
- Wimbledon: 3R (1982)
- US Open: 2R (1982, 1984)

Doubles
- Career record: 81–108
- Career titles: 2
- Highest ranking: 88 (2 Jan 1984)

Grand Slam doubles results
- Australian Open: 1R (1984)
- French Open: 3R (1983)
- Wimbledon: 2R (1983, 1984)
- US Open: 3R (1983)

Per Stefan Mikael Simonsson (born 5 January 1960 in Hyltebruk) is a Swedish former professional tennis player. He enjoyed most of his tennis success while playing singles. During his career, he won 2 doubles titles. He achieved a career-high singles ranking of World No. 49 in 1983 and a career-high doubles ranking of World No. 88 in 1984. He is a brother of fellow tennis player Hans Simonsson. After his career, he coached two top 10 players on the ATP ranking, Magnus Gustafsson and Magnus Larsson.

== Career ==
=== 1976–1978: Junior career ===
Simonsson won the Swedish Junior Indoor champion in 1976 as a 16 year old and in 1977 and 1978 the Swedish Junior Outdoor Champion. He played in his first Junior Grand Slam event at Wimbledon in 1977 and made his debut in a senior tournament at the Swedish Open.

==== Junior Slam results – Singles ====
- French Open: SF (1978)
- Wimbledon: QF (1978)
- US Open: F (1978)

=== 1979–1981 ===
In 1979, Simonsson reached the quarterfinals at the challenger event in Biarritz and he reached the same stage in Brussels and Taipei on the Grand Prix circuit. His best result in 1979 was making the semifinals in Tel Aviv. In doubles and with partner Per Hjertquist, he reached the semifinals in Brussels. Simonsson also made his Davis Cup debut for Sweden during July 1979 in the Europe Zone B, semifinals against Romania.

Simonsson started the 1980 season by competing on the challenger circuit, and in May, he reached the final at the Galatina Challenger. On the Grand Prix tour, he made the quarterfinals at Florence and the semifinals in Munich. In doubles, he reached two semifinals, with Hjertquist at Bordeaux and with his brother, Hans in Madrid. Simonsson represented Sweden during the 1980 Davis Cup, playing in both the singles and doubles.

In August 1981, Simonsson won his first titles on the challenger circuit when he captured both titles at the Le Touquet Challenger. In the singles, he defeated Georges Goven in the final and in the doubles, he teamed with compatriot Anders Järryd to win the title. Earlier in the year, he played in the singles final at the Turin challenger and with Järryd in the doubles final at the Royan challenger.

=== 1982–1983 ===
During May 1982, Simonsson made his first final on the Grand Prix tennis circuit at the tournament in Florence, where he lost in three sets to the world number 9 Vitas Gerulaitis. His other notable achievements of 1982 were two quarterfinals in Guarujá and in Toulouse. In February 1983, Simonsson reached the semifinals in Caracas and in the same month, he reached the quarterfinals at the Cairo Challenger. During the first three weeks of May, he made three semifinals, first at the Parioli Challenger, thereafter at Florence and at the Italian Open in Rome. After his performance during May, he broke into the top 50 in the world rankings for the first time. Simonsson played in two quarter-finals in 1983 at Båstad and Bordeaux.

At the Bordeaux Open he was successful in the doubles and won his first Grand Prix title with fellow Swede Magnus Tideman. In November and alongside Stanislav Birner, he played in his second doubles final at Ferrara, and the following week, he and Jan Gunnarsson reached the semifinals in Toulouse.

=== 1984–1986 ===
The 1984 season was less successful, with only one quarterfinal at Florence during May. In doubles, he made three semifinals: in Metz and Cologne, with Hjertquist and in Palermo with Ronnie Båthman.

In July 1985, Simonsson teamed with his brother and reached the semifinals at Båstad, and they won the doubles title in Hilversum, his second Grand Prix doubles title. Simonsson had one doubles semifinal at Florence with Mike De Palmer. In singles, he made one quarterfinal at Båstad. In 1986, Simonsson reached one quarterfinal on the Challenger Tour at Marrakesh, and he played his last singles match at Kitzbühel, losing in the first round.

== Grand Prix career finals ==
=== Singles: 1 (1 loss) ===
Result	W/L	Date	Tournament	Surface	Opponent	Score
Loss	0–1	May 1982	Florence, Italy	Clay	(United States) Vitas Gerulaitis	6–4, 3–6, 1–6

=== Doubles: 3 (2 wins, 1 loss) ===
Result	W/L	Date	Tournament	Surface	Partner	Opponents	Score
Win	1–0	Sep 1983	Bordeaux, France	Clay	(Sweden) Magnus Tideman	(Argentina) Francisco Yunis (Argentina) Juan Carlos Yunis	6–4, 6–2
Loss	1–1	Nov 1983	Ferrara, Italy	Carpet	(Czechoslovakia) Stanislav Birner	(South Africa) Bernard Mitton (United States) Butch Walts	6–7, 6–0, 3–6
Win	2–1	Jul 1985	Hilversum, Netherlands	Clay	(Sweden) Hans Simonsson	(Australia) Carl Limberger (Australia) Mark Woodforde	6–3, 6–4

== Junior Grand Slam finals ==
=== Singles: 1 (0–1) ===
Result	Year	Tournament	Surface	Opponent	Score
Loss	1978	US Open	Hard	(Sweden) Per Hjertquist	6–7, 6–1, 6–7

== Challenger titles ==
=== Singles: (1) ===
No.	Date	Tournament	Surface	Opponent	Score
1.	Aug 1981	Le Touquet, France	Clay	(France) Georges Goven	6–2, 6–1, 7–5

=== Doubles: (1) ===
No.	Date	Tournament	Surface	Partner	Opponents	Score
1.	Aug 1981	Le Touquet, France	Clay	(Sweden) Anders Järryd	(Czechoslovakia) Miroslav Lacek (Czechoslovakia) Libor Pimek	7–5, 7–5

== See also ==
- List of Sweden Davis Cup team representatives
