= 1976 U.S. Pro Tennis Championships – Singles =

Singles
- 1976 U.S. Pro Tennis Championships

Final
- Champion: (Sweden) Björn Borg
- Runner-up: (United States) Harold Solomon
- Score: 6–7, 6–4, 6–1, 6–2

Details
- Draw: 64
- Seeds: 2

Events
Singles	Doubles
← 1975 ·	U.S. Pro Tennis Championships	· 1977 →

The 1976 U.S. Pro Tennis Championships – Singles was an event of the 1976 U.S. Pro Tennis Championships tennis tournament and was played on outdoor green clay courts at the Longwood Cricket Club in Chestnut Hill, Massachusetts in the United States from August 23 through August 30, 1976. The draw comprised 64 players and two of them were seeded. Second-seeded Björn Borg was the defending U.S. Pro Tennis Championships singles champion and retained his title by defeating Harold Solomon in the final, 6–7, 6–4, 6–1, 6–2.

== Seeds ==
1. (United States) Jimmy Connors (Quarterfinals)
2. (Sweden) Björn Borg (Champion)

Click on the seed number of a player to go to their draw section.

== Draw ==
=== Key ===
- Q = Qualifier
- WC = Wild card
- LL = Lucky loser
- Alt = Alternate
- SE = Special exempt
- PR = Protected ranking
- ITF = ITF entry
- JE = Junior exempt
- w/o = Walkover
- r = Retired
- d = Defaulted
- SR = Special ranking

=== Finals ===
Quarterfinals
1	(United States) Jimmy Connors	3	6	3
(Mexico) Raúl Ramírez	6	3	6
(Italy) Paolo Bertolucci	6	2
(United States) Harold Solomon	7	6
(United States) Eddie Dibbs	2	6	7
(Argentina) Guillermo Vilas	6	2	5
(Italy) Adriano Panatta	2	4
2	(Sweden) Björn Borg	6	6

Semifinals
(Mexico) Raúl Ramírez	6	2	2
(United States) Harold Solomon	4	6	6
(United States) Eddie Dibbs	6	2	1
2	(Sweden) Björn Borg	7	6	6

Final
(United States) Harold Solomon	7	4	1
2	(Sweden) Björn Borg	6	6	6

=== Top half ===
==== Section 1 ====
First Round
1	(United States) Jimmy Connors	7	6
(United States) Steve Krulevitz	5	4
(United States) Jeff Borowiak	3	4
(Paraguay) Víctor Pecci	6	6
(Netherlands) Rolf Thung	4	1
(Czechoslovakia) Jiří Hřebec	6	6
(United States) Nick Saviano	2	6	6
(Australia) Kim Warwick	6	4	7
(Mexico) Raúl Ramírez	6	7
(Czechoslovakia) František Pála	3	5
(Chile) Patricio Cornejo	7	4	6
(United States) Tom Gullikson	6	6	2
(United States) Brian Gottfried	6	6
(Spain) Juan Gisbert Sr.	3	1
(Egypt) Ismail El Shafei	6	6
(United States) Mike Cahill	4	3

Second Round
1	(United States) Jimmy Connors	6	6
(Paraguay) Víctor Pecci	4	3
(Czechoslovakia) Jiří Hřebec	7	6
(Australia) Kim Warwick	6	2
(Mexico) Raúl Ramírez	6	4
(Chile) Patricio Cornejo	4	1^{r}
(United States) Brian Gottfried	6	6	6
(Egypt) Ismail El Shafei	7	3	2

Third Round
1	(United States) Jimmy Connors	2	6	6
(Czechoslovakia) Jiří Hřebec	6	2	3
(Mexico) Raúl Ramírez	6	6
(United States) Brian Gottfried	2	4

Quarterfinals
1	(United States) Jimmy Connors	3	6	3
(Mexico) Raúl Ramírez	6	3	6

==== Section 2 ====
First Round
(Spain) Manuel Orantes	4	4
(Italy) Paolo Bertolucci	6	6
(United States) Doug Crawford	4	6	3
(Argentina) Ricardo Cano	6	1	6
(Poland) Wojciech Fibak	6	4	6
(United States) Bill Scanlon	1	6	4
(United States) Ferdi Taygan	3	1
(United Kingdom) Gerald Battrick	6	6
(United States) Harold Solomon	2	6	6
(Japan) Jun Kuki	6	2	1
(Colombia) Iván Molina	2	6	6
(South Africa) Bob Hewitt	6	1	2
(United States) Stan Smith	3	7	6
(United States) Tim Gullikson	6	6	4
(Australia) John Alexander	6	3	6
(West Germany) Jürgen Fassbender	1	6	1

Second Round
(Italy) Paolo Bertolucci	7	6
(Argentina) Ricardo Cano	6	3
(Poland) Wojciech Fibak	6	6
(United Kingdom) Gerald Battrick	3	1
(United States) Harold Solomon	6	6
(Colombia) Iván Molina	2	1
(United States) Stan Smith	7	6	3
(Australia) John Alexander	6	7	6

Third Round
(Italy) Paolo Bertolucci	6	6
(Poland) Wojciech Fibak	1	2
(United States) Harold Solomon	6	6
(Australia) John Alexander	2	1

Quarterfinals
(Italy) Paolo Bertolucci	6	2
(United States) Harold Solomon	7	6

=== Bottom half ===
==== Section 3 ====
First Round
(South Africa) Pat Cramer	1	6	2
(Australia) Ray Ruffels	6	3	6
(Austria) Hans Kary	4	6	6
(United States) Pat DuPré	6	1	3
(United States) Charlie Pasarell	6	7
(Australia) Geoff Masters	3	5
(Chile) Belus Prajoux	4	3
(United States) Eddie Dibbs	6	6
(Argentina) Lito Álvarez	6	6
(United States) Norman Holmes	3	3
(Spain) José Higueras	6	4	2
(Chile) Jaime Fillol	4	6	6
(Colombia) Jairo Velasco Sr.	3	6	7
(France) François Jauffret	6	1	6
(France) Jean-Louis Haillet	3	4
(Argentina) Guillermo Vilas	6	6

Second Round
(Australia) Ray Ruffels	4	4
(Austria) Hans Kary	6	6
(United States) Charlie Pasarell	4	4
(United States) Eddie Dibbs	6	6
(Argentina) Lito Álvarez	6	6	1
(Chile) Jaime Fillol	7	1	6
(Colombia) Jairo Velasco Sr.	5	6	5
(Argentina) Guillermo Vilas	7	3	7

Third Round
(Austria) Hans Kary	4	3
(United States) Eddie Dibbs	6	6
(Chile) Jaime Fillol	5	4
(Argentina) Guillermo Vilas	7	6

Quarterfinals
(United States) Eddie Dibbs	2	6	7
(Argentina) Guillermo Vilas	6	2	5

==== Section 4 ====
First Round
(United States) Mike Estep	6	2	2
(Australia) Mark Edmondson	3	6	6
(Colombia) Álvaro Betancur	5	2
(Italy) Corrado Barazzutti	7	6
(Bolivia) Ramiro Benavides	1	6	6
(Australia) Allan Stone	6	4	4
(Italy) Tonino Zugarelli	3	6
(Italy) Adriano Panatta	6	7
(United States) Jim Delaney	7	6
(New Zealand) Brian Fairlie	5	2
(France) Éric Deblicker	3	3
(Australia) Ross Case	6	6
(West Germany) Hans-Jürgen Pohmann	6	7
(South Africa) Terry Ryan	4	5
(United States) John Whitlinger	3	1
2	(Sweden) Björn Borg	6	6

Second Round
(Australia) Mark Edmondson	7	6
(Italy) Corrado Barazzutti	6	2
(Bolivia) Ramiro Benavides	2	0
(Italy) Adriano Panatta	6	6
(United States) Jim Delaney	4	6
(Australia) Ross Case	6	7
(West Germany) Hans-Jürgen Pohmann	2	1
2	(Sweden) Björn Borg	6	6

Third Round
(Australia) Mark Edmondson	2	3
(Italy) Adriano Panatta	6	6
(Australia) Ross Case	0	7	3
2	(Sweden) Björn Borg	6	5	6

Quarterfinals
(Italy) Adriano Panatta	2	4
2	(Sweden) Björn Borg	6	6
