= 1976 U.S. Pro Tennis Championships – Doubles =

Doubles
- 1976 U.S. Pro Tennis Championships

Final
- Champion: (Australia) Ray Ruffels (Australia) Allan Stone
- Runner-up: (United States) Mike Cahill (United States) John Whitlinger
- Score: 3–6, 6–3, 7–6

Details
- Draw: 32
- Seeds: 2

Events
Singles	Doubles
← 1975 ·	U.S. Pro Tennis Championships	· 1977 →

The 1976 U.S. Pro Tennis Championships – Doubles was an event of the 1976 U.S. Pro Tennis Championships tennis tournament and was played on outdoor green clay courts at the Longwood Cricket Club in Chestnut Hill, Massachusetts in the United States from August 23 through August 30, 1976. The draw comprised 32 teams of which two were seeded. Brian Gottfried and Raúl Ramírez were the defending U.S. Pro Tennis Championships doubles champions but lost in the first round. The unseeded team of Brian Gottfried and Raúl Ramírez won the title by defeating the team of Mike Cahill and John Whitlinger, also unseeded, in the final, 3–6, 6–3, 7–6.

== Seeds ==
1. (United States) Brian Gottfried / (Mexico) Raúl Ramírez (first round)
2. (Spain) Juan Gisbert Sr. / (Spain) Manuel Orantes (first round, withdrew)

== Draw ==
=== Key ===
- Q = Qualifier
- WC = Wild card
- LL = Lucky loser
- Alt = Alternate
- SE = Special exempt
- PR = Protected ranking
- ITF = ITF entry
- JE = Junior exempt
- w/o = Walkover
- r = Retired
- d = Defaulted
- SR = Special ranking

=== Finals ===
Semifinals
(Australia) Mark Edmondson (Australia) John Marks	2	4
(Australia) Ray Ruffels (Australia) Allan Stone	6	6
(United States) Charlie Pasarell (United States) Stan Smith	6	1
(United States) Mike Cahill (United States) John Whitlinger	7	6

Final
(Australia) Ray Ruffels (Australia) Allan Stone	3	6	7
(United States) Mike Cahill (United States) John Whitlinger	6	3	6

=== Top half ===
First Round
1	(United States) Brian Gottfried (Mexico) Raúl Ramírez	4	6	2
(Australia) Mark Edmondson (Australia) John Marks	6	3	6
(Bolivia) Ramiro Benavides (Czechoslovakia) František Pála	3	3
(Colombia) Iván Molina (Colombia) Jairo Velasco Sr.	6	6
(Australia) John Alexander (United States) Mike Estep	7	6
(United States) Raz Reid (Netherlands) Rolf Thung	6	4
(United States) Hank Pfister (United States) Bill Scanlon	6	6	7
(United States) Pat DuPré (United States) Ferdi Taygan	7	0	6
(Australia) Ross Case (Australia) Geoff Masters	4	6
(United States) Jim McManus (Sweden) Tenny Svensson	6	7
(United Kingdom) Gerald Battrick (United States) Norman Holmes	6	1^{r}
(Argentina) Ricardo Cano (Chile) Belus Prajoux	7	3
(France) Éric Deblicker (France) Jean-Louis Haillet	2	1
(Australia) Ray Ruffels (Australia) Allan Stone	6	6
(Czechoslovakia) Jiří Hřebec (Austria) Hans Kary	2	2
(United States) Jeff Borowiak (South Africa) Bob Hewitt	6	6

Second Round
(Australia) Mark Edmondson (Australia) John Marks	6	6
(Colombia) Iván Molina (Colombia) Jairo Velasco Sr.	1	4
(Australia) John Alexander (United States) Mike Estep	1	6	6
(United States) Hank Pfister (United States) Bill Scanlon	6	4	3
(United States) Jim McManus (Sweden) Tenny Svensson	1	1
(Argentina) Ricardo Cano (Chile) Belus Prajoux	6	6
(Australia) Ray Ruffels (Australia) Allan Stone	6	6
(United States) Jeff Borowiak (South Africa) Bob Hewitt	1	1

Quarterfinals
(Australia) Mark Edmondson (Australia) John Marks	2	6	6
(Australia) John Alexander (United States) Mike Estep	6	4	4
(Argentina) Ricardo Cano (Chile) Belus Prajoux	0	6	3
(Australia) Ray Ruffels (Australia) Allan Stone	6	3	6

Semifinals
(Australia) Mark Edmondson (Australia) John Marks	2	4
(Australia) Ray Ruffels (Australia) Allan Stone	6	6

=== Bottom half ===
First Round
(Italy) Paolo Bertolucci (Italy) Adriano Panatta	6	6
(United States) Tim Gullikson (United States) Tom Gullikson	3	4
(Australia) Cliff Letcher (Australia) Kim Warwick	6	6
(South Africa) Pat Cramer (United States) Steve Krulevitz	3	0
(United States) Jerry Cromwell (United States) Paul Sullivan	2	7	2
(United States) Bill Cashman (United States) Bill Drake	6	5	6
(Egypt) Ismail El Shafei (New Zealand) Brian Fairlie	3	1^{r}
(United States) Charlie Pasarell (United States) Stan Smith	6	3
(United States) Eddie Dibbs (United States) Harold Solomon	6	6
(Chile) Patricio Cornejo (Chile) Jaime Fillol	4	1
(Argentina) Elio Lito Alvarez (Paraguay) Víctor Pecci	6	6	6
(Colombia) Álvaro Betancur (Japan) Jun Kuki	3	7	2
(Australia) Paul Kronk (South Africa) Frew McMillan	6	6	5
(United States) Jim Delaney (United States) Mike MacHette	7	3	7
(United States) Mike Cahill (United States) John Whitlinger	w/o
2	(Spain) Juan Gisbert Sr. (Spain) Manuel Orantes

Second Round
(Italy) Paolo Bertolucci (Italy) Adriano Panatta	7	7
(Australia) Cliff Letcher (Australia) Kim Warwick	6	6
(United States) Bill Cashman (United States) Bill Drake	3	2
(United States) Charlie Pasarell (United States) Stan Smith	6	6
(United States) Eddie Dibbs (United States) Harold Solomon	7	5	6
(Argentina) Elio Lito Alvarez (Paraguay) Víctor Pecci	6	7	4
(United States) Jim Delaney (United States) Mike MacHette	6	3
(United States) Mike Cahill (United States) John Whitlinger	7	6

Quarterfinals
(Italy) Paolo Bertolucci (Italy) Adriano Panatta	3	4
(United States) Charlie Pasarell (United States) Stan Smith	6	6
(United States) Eddie Dibbs (United States) Harold Solomon
(United States) Mike Cahill (United States) John Whitlinger	w/o

Semifinals
(United States) Charlie Pasarell (United States) Stan Smith	6	1
(United States) Mike Cahill (United States) John Whitlinger	7	6
