= 1974 U.S. Pro Tennis Championships – Singles =

Singles
- 1974 U.S. Pro Tennis Championships

Final
- Champion: (Sweden) Björn Borg
- Runner-up: (Netherlands) Tom Okker
- Score: 7–6^{(7–3)}, 6–1, 6–1

Details
- Draw: 64

Events
Singles	Doubles
← 1973 ·	U.S. Pro Tennis Championships	· 1975 →

The 1974 U.S. Pro Tennis Championships – Singles was an event of the 1974 U.S. Pro Tennis Championships tennis tournament and was played on outdoor green clay courts at the Longwood Cricket Club in Chestnut Hill, Massachusetts in the United States from August 20 through August 26, 1974. The draw comprised 64 players. Jimmy Connors was the defending U.S. Pro Tennis Championships singles champion but did not compete in this edition. Björn Borg won the title by defeating Tom Okker in the final, 7–6^{(7–3)}, 6–1, 6–1.

== Draw ==
=== Key ===
- Q = Qualifier
- WC = Wild card
- LL = Lucky loser
- Alt = Alternate
- SE = Special exempt
- PR = Protected ranking
- ITF = ITF entry
- JE = Junior exempt
- w/o = Walkover
- r = Retired
- d = Defaulted
- SR = Special ranking

=== Finals ===
Quarterfinals
(Netherlands) Tom Okker	3	6	6
(Egypt) Ismail El Shafei	6	3	1
(Romania) Ilie Năstase	5	6	1
(Argentina) Guillermo Vilas	7	1	6
(United States) Marty Riessen	6	6	0^{r}
(Sweden) Björn Borg	4	7	5
(United States) Arthur Ashe	3	2
(Czechoslovakia) Jan Kodeš	6	6

Semifinals
(Netherlands) Tom Okker	6	6	6
(Argentina) Guillermo Vilas	4	3	2
(Sweden) Björn Borg	7	6	1
(Czechoslovakia) Jan Kodeš	6	0	6

Final
(Netherlands) Tom Okker	6	1	1
(Sweden) Björn Borg	7	6	6

=== Top half ===
==== Section 1 ====
First Round
(Netherlands) Tom Okker	7	6
(Denmark) Torben Ulrich	6	4
(United States) Jim McManus	6	6	2
(Sweden) Ove Bengtson	7	1	6
(United States) Bailey Brown	2	6	0
(Colombia) Jairo Velasco Sr.	6	3	6
(United States) Brant Bailey	2	5
(United States) Charlie Pasarell	6	7
(Spain) Manuel Orantes	7	5	6
(Chile) Jaime Pinto Bravo	6	7	1
(United States) Dean Martin	1	0
(United States) Erik van Dillen	6	6
(Czechoslovakia) František Pála	6	6
(Romania) Ion Țiriac	4	0
(Serbia) Nikola Špear	4	6	4
(Egypt) Ismail El Shafei	6	4	6

Second Round
(Netherlands) Tom Okker	6	1	6
(Sweden) Ove Bengtson	3	6	2
(Colombia) Jairo Velasco Sr.	6	5	2
(United States) Charlie Pasarell	2	7	6
(Spain) Manuel Orantes	3	6	6
(United States) Erik van Dillen	6	2	1
(Czechoslovakia) František Pála	6	6
(Egypt) Ismail El Shafei	7	7

Third Round
(Netherlands) Tom Okker	7	6
(United States) Charlie Pasarell	6	3
(Spain) Manuel Orantes
(Egypt) Ismail El Shafei	w/o

Quarterfinals
(Netherlands) Tom Okker	3	6	6
(Egypt) Ismail El Shafei	6	3	1

==== Section 2 ====
First Round
(Romania) Ilie Năstase	6	6
(United States) Raz Reid	4	1
(United Kingdom) Roger Taylor	6	7
(Spain) Juan Gisbert Sr.	4	5
(United States) Harold Solomon	6	7
(West Germany) Karl Meiler	4	6
(France) Georges Goven	6	5	4
(Czechoslovakia) Milan Holeček	4	7	6
(Argentina) Guillermo Vilas	6	6
(Canada) Mike Belkin	2	2
(Japan) Jun Kuki	6	5
(West Germany) Hans-Jürgen Pohmann	7	7
(United States) Roscoe Tanner	4	1
(Australia) Barry Phillips-Moore	6	6
(United States) Robert Wright	1	3
(Australia) Paul Kronk	6	6

Second Round
(Romania) Ilie Năstase	6	6
(United Kingdom) Roger Taylor	0	3
(United States) Harold Solomon	6	3	5
(Czechoslovakia) Milan Holeček	4	6	7
(Argentina) Guillermo Vilas	6	6
(West Germany) Hans-Jürgen Pohmann	0	2
(Australia) Barry Phillips-Moore	6	6
(Australia) Paul Kronk	2	3

Third Round
(Romania) Ilie Năstase	2	6	6
(Czechoslovakia) Milan Holeček	6	2	4
(Argentina) Guillermo Vilas	6	6
(Australia) Barry Phillips-Moore	4	2

Quarterfinals
(Romania) Ilie Năstase	5	6	1
(Argentina) Guillermo Vilas	7	1	6

=== Bottom half ===
==== Section 3 ====
First Round
(Australia) Geoff Masters	6	6
(Austria) Hans Kary	3	2
(Australia) Dick Crealy	1	1
(Chile) Jaime Fillol	6	6
(United States) Jeff Borowiak	7	6
(Czechoslovakia) Jiří Hřebec	5	4
(Colombia) Iván Molina	4	6	0
(United States) Marty Riessen	6	4	6
(United States) Chauncey Steele III	5	2
(Chile) Belus Prajoux	7	6
(Chile) Patricio Cornejo	7	6
(Australia) John Alexander	5	2
(Czechoslovakia) Vladimír Zedník	6	4	4
(Mexico) Marcelo Lara	3	6	6
(United States) Paul Sullivan	3	0
(Sweden) Björn Borg	6	6

Second Round
(Australia) Geoff Masters	7	3	6
(Chile) Jaime Fillol	5	6	3
(United States) Jeff Borowiak	3	2
(United States) Marty Riessen	6	6
(Chile) Belus Prajoux	7	7
(Chile) Patricio Cornejo	5	5
(Mexico) Marcelo Lara	2	0
(Sweden) Björn Borg	6	6

Third Round
(Australia) Geoff Masters	4	4
(United States) Marty Riessen	6	6
(Chile) Belus Prajoux	2	6	2
(Sweden) Björn Borg	6	3	6

Quarterfinals
(United States) Marty Riessen	6	6	0^{r}
(Sweden) Björn Borg	4	7	5

==== Section 4 ====
First Round
(United States) Bob Lutz	6	6
(United States) Bill Drake	1	0
(Venezuela) Jorge Andrew	1	4
(United States) Eddie Dibbs	6	6
(United States) Doug Crawford	6	6	6
(United Kingdom) Graham Stilwell	1	7	2
(Mexico) Joaquín Loyo-Mayo	6	3	6
(United States) Arthur Ashe	3	6	7
(Australia) Bob Rheinberger	6	5	7
(United States) Ben Bishop	4	7	5
(Pakistan) Haroon Rahim	4	3
(Czechoslovakia) Jan Kodeš	6	6
(Spain) Antonio Muñoz	1	2
(Japan) Jun Kamiwazumi	6	6
(Australia) Ross Case	0	3
(United States) Stan Smith	6	6

Second Round
(United States) Bob Lutz	2	5
(United States) Eddie Dibbs	6	7
(United States) Doug Crawford	2	2
(United States) Arthur Ashe	6	6
(Australia) Bob Rheinberger	6	0
(Czechoslovakia) Jan Kodeš	7	6
(Japan) Jun Kamiwazumi	5	6	7
(United States) Stan Smith	7	2	5

Third Round
(United States) Eddie Dibbs	4	3
(United States) Arthur Ashe	6	6
(Czechoslovakia) Jan Kodeš	6	6
(Japan) Jun Kamiwazumi	1	2

Quarterfinals
(United States) Arthur Ashe	3	2
(Czechoslovakia) Jan Kodeš	6	6
