= 1974 U.S. Pro Tennis Championships – Doubles =

Doubles
- 1974 U.S. Pro Tennis Championships

Final
- Champion: (United States) Bob Lutz (United States) Stan Smith
- Runner-up: (West Germany) Hans-Jürgen Pohmann (United States) Marty Riessen
- Score: 3–6, 6–4, 6–3

Details
- Draw: 32
- Seeds: 8

Events
Singles	Doubles
← 1973 ·	U.S. Pro Tennis Championships	· 1975 →

The 1974 U.S. Pro Tennis Championships – Doubles was an event of the 1974 U.S. Pro Tennis Championships tennis tournament and was played on outdoor green clay courts at the Longwood Cricket Club in Chestnut Hill, Massachusetts in the United States from August 20 through August 26, 1974. The draw comprised 32 teams of which eight were seeded. Erik van Dillen and Stan Smith were the defending U.S. Pro Tennis Championships doubles champions but did not compete together in this edition. First-seeded team of Bob Lutz and Stan Smith won the title by defeating eighth-seeded Hans-Jürgen Pohmann and Marty Riessen in the final, 3–6, 6–4, 6–3.

== Seeds ==
1. (United States) Bob Lutz / (United States) Stan Smith (champions)
2. (Spain) Manuel Orantes / (Argentina) Guillermo Vilas (quarterfinals)
3. (United States) Charlie Pasarell / (United States) Erik van Dillen (first round)
4. (Chile) Patricio Cornejo / (Chile) Jaime Fillol (quarterfinals)
5. (Sweden) Björn Borg / (Sweden) Ove Bengtson (first round)
6. (Spain) Juan Gisbert Sr. / (Romania) Ilie Năstase (quarterfinals)
7. (United States) Arthur Ashe / (United States) Roscoe Tanner (semifinals)
8. (West Germany) Hans-Jürgen Pohmann / (United States) Marty Riessen (final)

== Draw ==
=== Key ===
- Q = Qualifier
- WC = Wild card
- LL = Lucky loser
- Alt = Alternate
- SE = Special exempt
- PR = Protected ranking
- ITF = ITF entry
- JE = Junior exempt
- w/o = Walkover
- r = Retired
- d = Defaulted
- SR = Special ranking

=== Finals ===
Semifinals
8	(West Germany) Hans-Jürgen Pohmann (United States) Marty Riessen	6	6
(Australia) Ross Case (Australia) Geoff Masters	4	4
7	(United States) Arthur Ashe (United States) Roscoe Tanner	3	6	5
1	(United States) Bob Lutz (United States) Stan Smith	6	3	7

Final
8	(West Germany) Hans-Jürgen Pohmann (United States) Marty Riessen	6	4	3
1	(United States) Bob Lutz (United States) Stan Smith	3	6	6

=== Top half ===
First Round
2	(Spain) Manuel Orantes (Argentina) Guillermo Vilas	6	6
(United States) Raz Reid (United Kingdom) Roger Taylor	4	4
(United States) Jeff Borowiak (United States) Jim McManus	4	3
(United States) Bailey Brown (United States) Doug Crawford	6	6
(Egypt) Ismail El Shafei (France) Georges Goven	7	4	3
(Australia) John Alexander (Australia) Dick Crealy	5	6	6
(United States) Ben Bishop (Australia) Bob Rheinberger	0	2
8	(West Germany) Hans-Jürgen Pohmann (United States) Marty Riessen	6	6
5	(Sweden) Björn Borg (Sweden) Ove Bengtson	2	6	5
(Colombia) Iván Molina (Colombia) Jairo Velasco Sr.	6	3	7
(United States) Jerry Cromwell; Unknown	4	6	7
(Japan) Jun Kuki (Mexico) Joaquín Loyo-Mayo	6	4	6
(Pakistan) Haroon Rahim (Denmark) Torben Ulrich	1	6	2
(Japan) Jun Kamiwazumi (Australia) Paul Kronk	6	0	6
(Australia) Ross Case (Australia) Geoff Masters	6	6
3	(United States) Charlie Pasarell (United States) Erik van Dillen	4	3

Second Round
2	(Spain) Manuel Orantes (Argentina) Guillermo Vilas	w/o
(United States) Bailey Brown (United States) Doug Crawford
(Australia) John Alexander (Australia) Dick Crealy	6	3	2
8	(West Germany) Hans-Jürgen Pohmann (United States) Marty Riessen	3	6	6
(Colombia) Iván Molina (Colombia) Jairo Velasco Sr.	6	6
(United States) Jerry Cromwell; Unknown	2	3
(Japan) Jun Kamiwazumi (Australia) Paul Kronk	3	3
(Australia) Ross Case (Australia) Geoff Masters	6	6

Quarterfinals
2	(Spain) Manuel Orantes (Argentina) Guillermo Vilas	6	6	0
8	(West Germany) Hans-Jürgen Pohmann (United States) Marty Riessen	4	7	6
(Colombia) Iván Molina (Colombia) Jairo Velasco Sr.	1	6	1
(Australia) Ross Case (Australia) Geoff Masters	6	3	6

Semifinals
8	(West Germany) Hans-Jürgen Pohmann (United States) Marty Riessen	6	6
(Australia) Ross Case (Australia) Geoff Masters	4	4

=== Bottom half ===
First Round
4	(Chile) Patricio Cornejo (Chile) Jaime Fillol	w/o
(Austria) Hans Kary (United Kingdom) Graham Stilwell
(Australia) Barry Phillips-Moore (Czechoslovakia) František Pála	4	6	6
(United States) Eddie Dibbs (United States) Harold Solomon	6	3	1
(Czechoslovakia) Jan Kodeš (Czechoslovakia) Vladimír Zedník	2	2
(Mexico) Marcelo Lara (Spain) Antonio Muñoz	6	6
(United States) Keith Jennings (United States) Paul Sullivan	1	5
7	(United States) Arthur Ashe (United States) Roscoe Tanner	6	7
6	(Spain) Juan Gisbert Sr. (Romania) Ilie Năstase	6	6
(United States) Brant Bailey (United States) Robert Wright	1	3
(Czechoslovakia) Jiří Hřebec (Serbia) Nikola Špear	7	7
(United States) Bill Drake (United States) Chauncey Steele III	6	6
(Czechoslovakia) Milan Holeček (West Germany) Karl Meiler	6	6
(Venezuela) Jorge Andrew (United States) Dean Martin	1	4
(Chile) Belus Prajoux (Chile) Jaime Pinto Bravo	6	6	2
1	(United States) Bob Lutz (United States) Stan Smith	2	7	6

Second Round
4	(Chile) Patricio Cornejo (Chile) Jaime Fillol	7	6
(Australia) Barry Phillips-Moore (Czechoslovakia) František Pála	6	2
(Mexico) Marcelo Lara (Spain) Antonio Muñoz	6	3	4
7	(United States) Arthur Ashe (United States) Roscoe Tanner	4	6	6
6	(Spain) Juan Gisbert Sr. (Romania) Ilie Năstase	w/o
(Czechoslovakia) Jiří Hřebec (Serbia) Nikola Špear
(Czechoslovakia) Milan Holeček (West Germany) Karl Meiler	6	6	1
1	(United States) Bob Lutz (United States) Stan Smith	7	3	6

Quarterfinals
4	(Chile) Patricio Cornejo (Chile) Jaime Fillol	6	4	5
7	(United States) Arthur Ashe (United States) Roscoe Tanner	4	6	7
6	(Spain) Juan Gisbert Sr. (Romania) Ilie Năstase	3	6	5
1	(United States) Bob Lutz (United States) Stan Smith	6	1	7

Semifinals
7	(United States) Arthur Ashe (United States) Roscoe Tanner	3	6	5
1	(United States) Bob Lutz (United States) Stan Smith	6	3	7
