= 1978 U.S. Pro Tennis Championships =

1978 US Pro Championships
- Date: August 21–29
- Edition: 51st
- Category: Grand Prix
- Draw: 64S / 32D
- Prize money: $200,000
- Surface: Clay / outdoor
- Location: Chestnut Hill, Massachusetts, United States
- Venue: Longwood Cricket Club

Champions

Singles
- (Spain) Manuel Orantes

Doubles
- (Hungary) Balázs Taróczy / (Paraguay) Víctor Pecci
← 1977 ·	U.S. Pro Tennis Championships	· 1979 →

The 1978 U.S. Pro Tennis Championships was a men's tennis tournament played on outdoor green clay courts (Har-Tru) at the Longwood Cricket Club in Chestnut Hill, Massachusetts in the United States. The event was part of the 1978 Grand Prix circuit. It was the 51st edition of the tournament and was held from August 21 through August 28, 1978. Despite pressure to switch to a hard court surface from the Association of Tennis Professionals (ATP) and some leading players, in line with the surface change made that year by the US Open which directly followed the Boston event, the tournament organization elected to remain a clay court tournament in 1978. Several top players including Björn Borg, Guillermo Vilas and Jimmy Connors elected not to play the tournament. Fourth-seeded and defending champion Manuel Orantes won the singles title and the accompanying $32,000 first-prize money. The final was delayed until Tuesday, August 29 due to rain.

== Finals ==
=== Singles ===
(Spain) Manuel Orantes defeated (United States) Harold Solomon 6–4, 6–3

- It was Orantes' only singles title of the year and the 33rd of his career.

=== Doubles ===
(Hungary) Balázs Taróczy / (Paraguay) Víctor Pecci defeated (Switzerland) Heinz Günthardt / (United States) Van Winitsky 6–3, 3–6, 6–1
