= 1976 U.S. Pro Tennis Championships =

- Date: August 23–30
- Edition: 49th
- Category: Grand Prix (4 Star)
- Draw: 64S / 32D
- Prize money: $125,000
- Surface: Clay / outdoor
- Location: Chestnut Hill, Massachusetts
- Venue: Longwood Cricket Club

Champions

Singles
- (Sweden) Björn Borg

Doubles
- (Australia) Ray Ruffels / (Australia) Allan Stone
← 1975 ·	U.S. Pro Tennis Championships	· 1977 →

The 1976 U.S. Pro Tennis Championships was a men's tennis tournament played on outdoor green clay courts (Har-Tru) at the Longwood Cricket Club in Chestnut Hill, Massachusetts in the United States. It was classified as a 4 Star category tournament and was part of the 1976 Grand Prix circuit. It was the 49th edition of the tournament and was held from August 23 through August 30, 1976. Second-seeded, and defending champion of the previous two editions, Björn Borg won the singles title and the accompanying $25,000 first-prize money as well as a 100 Grand Prix ranking points.

== Finals ==
=== Singles ===
(Sweden) Björn Borg defeated (United States) Harold Solomon 6–7^{(3–7)}, 6–4, 6–1, 6–2

- It was Borg's 6th singles title of the year and the 19th of his career.

=== Doubles ===
(Australia) Ray Ruffels / (Australia) Allan Stone defeated (United States) Mike Cahill / (United States) John Whitlinger 3–6, 6–3, 7–6
