= 1984 U.S. Pro Tennis Championships =

- Date: July 16–22
- Edition: 57th
- Category: Grand Prix
- Draw: 64S / 32D
- Prize money: $200,000
- Surface: Clay / outdoor
- Location: Chestnut Hill, Massachusetts
- Venue: Longwood Cricket Club

Champions

Singles
- (United States) Aaron Krickstein

Doubles
- (United States) Ken Flach / (United States) Robert Seguso
← 1983 ·	U.S. Pro Tennis Championships	· 1985 →

The 1984 U.S. Pro Tennis Championships was a men's tennis tournament played on outdoor green clay courts at the Longwood Cricket Club in Chestnut Hill, Massachusetts in the United States. The event was part of the Super Series of the 1984 Volvo Grand Prix circuit. It was the 57th edition of the tournament and was held from July 16 through July 22, 1984. Sixth-seeded Aaron Krickstein won the singles title and earned $34,000 first-prize money.

== Finals ==
=== Singles ===
(United States) Aaron Krickstein defeated (Argentina) José Luis Clerc 7–6, 3–6, 6–4

- It was Krickstein's 1st singles title of the year and the 2nd of his career.

=== Doubles ===
(United States) Ken Flach / (United States) Robert Seguso defeated (United States) Gary Donnelly / (Puerto Rico) Ernie Fernández 6–4, 6–4
