= 1974 U.S. Pro Tennis Championships =

- Date: August 20–26
- Edition: 47th
- Category: Grand Prix (Group AA)
- Draw: 64S / 32D
- Prize money: $100,000
- Surface: Clay / outdoor
- Location: Chestnut Hill, Massachusetts
- Venue: Longwood Cricket Club

Champions

Singles
- (Sweden) Björn Borg

Doubles
- (United States) Bob Lutz / (United States) Stan Smith
| ← 1973 · | U.S. Pro Tennis Championships | · 1975 → |

The 1974 U.S. Pro Tennis Championships was a men's tennis tournament played on outdoor green clay courts (Har-Tru) at the Longwood Cricket Club in Chestnut Hill, Massachusetts in the United States. It was classified as a Group AA category tournament and was part of the 1974 Grand Prix circuit. It was the 47th edition of the tournament and was held from August 20 through August 26, 1974. Fourth-seeded Björn Borg won the singles title and the accompanying $16,000 first prize money. En route to the final Borg survived match points in both his quarterfinal match against Marty Riessen and his semifinal match against Jan Kodeš. With his victory Borg became the youngest winner of the US Pro Championships at 18 years and two months, surpassing title-holder Jimmy Connors who did not defend his title but instead elected to play the Eastern Grass Court Championships in preparation for the US Open. After the final, which was watched by a crowd of almost 6,000, Okker commented "This was the first time I've played Björn Borg and at the moment I'm hoping it will be the last!".

== Finals ==
=== Singles ===
(Sweden) Björn Borg defeated (Netherlands) Tom Okker 7–6^{(7–3)}, 6–1, 6–1

- It was Borg's 7th singles title of the year and of his career.

=== Doubles ===
(United States) Bob Lutz / (United States) Stan Smith defeated (United States) Marty Riessen / (West Germany) Hans-Jürgen Pohmann 3–6, 6–4, 6–3
