= 1987 U.S. Pro Tennis Championships =

- Date: July 6–12
- Edition: 60th
- Category: Grand Prix
- Draw: 56S / 28D
- Prize money: $232,000
- Surface: Clay / outdoor
- Location: Chestnut Hill, Massachusetts
- Venue: Longwood Cricket Club

Champions

Singles
- (Sweden) Mats Wilander

Doubles
- (Chile) Hans Gildemeister / (Ecuador) Andrés Gómez
- U.S. Pro Tennis Championships

The 1987 U.S. Pro Tennis Championships was a men's tennis tournament played on outdoor green clay courts at the Longwood Cricket Club in Chestnut Hill, Massachusetts in the United States. The event was part of the Super Series of the 1987 Nabisco Grand Prix circuit. It was the 60th edition of the tournament and was held from July 6 through July 12, 1987. First-seeded Mats Wilander won the singles title, his second at the event after 1985.

== Finals ==
=== Singles ===
(Sweden) Mats Wilander defeated (Sweden) Kent Carlsson 7–6, 6–1

- It was Wilander's 4th singles title of the year and the 25th of his career.

=== Doubles ===
(Chile) Hans Gildemeister / (Ecuador) Andrés Gómez defeated (Sweden) Joakim Nyström / (Sweden) Mats Wilander 7–6, 3–6, 6–1
