= 1984 U.S. Pro Tennis Championships – Singles =

Singles
- 1984 U.S. Pro Tennis Championships

Final
- Champion: (United States) Aaron Krickstein
- Runner-up: (Argentina) José Luis Clerc
- Score: 7–6, 3–6, 6–4

Details
- Draw: 56 (4WC/7Q/1LL)
- Seeds: 16

Events
Singles	Doubles
← 1983 ·	U.S. Pro Tennis Championships	· 1985 →

José Luis Clerc was the defending champion, but lost in the final to 16-year old Aaron Krickstein. The score was 7–6, 3–6, 6–4.

== Seeds ==
The top eight seeds receive a bye into the second round.

1. (United States) Jimmy Arias (quarterfinals)
2. (Ecuador) Andrés Gómez (semifinals)
3. (Argentina) José Luis Clerc (final)
4. (Spain) Juan Aguilera (second round)
5. (Argentina) Guillermo Vilas (quarterfinals)
6. (United States) Aaron Krickstein (champion)
7. (Uruguay) Diego Pérez (second round)
8. (United States) Mel Purcell (third round)
9. (Czechoslovakia) Libor Pimek (third round)
10. (United States) Mark Dickson (third round)
11. (Peru) Pablo Arraya (third round)
12. (Spain) Fernando Luna (third round)
13. (United States) Jimmy Brown (second round)
14. (Australia) Brad Drewett (second round)
15. (Brazil) Cássio Motta (second round)
16. (Argentina) Roberto Argüello (second round)

== Draw ==
=== Key ===
- Q = Qualifier
- WC = Wild card
- LL = Lucky loser
- Alt = Alternate
- SE = Special exempt
- PR = Protected ranking
- ITF = ITF entry
- JE = Junior exempt
- w/o = Walkover
- r = Retired
- d = Defaulted
- SR = Special ranking

=== Finals ===
Quarterfinals
1	(United States) Jimmy Arias	4	3
6	(United States) Aaron Krickstein	6	6
(Australia) John Alexander	4	4
(Czechoslovakia) Pavel Složil	6	6
(United States) Mike Leach	6	3
3	(Argentina) José Luis Clerc	7	6
5	(Argentina) Guillermo Vilas	7	4	4
2	(Ecuador) Andrés Gómez	6	6	6

Semifinals
6	(United States) Aaron Krickstein	6	6
(Czechoslovakia) Pavel Složil	3	4
3	(Argentina) José Luis Clerc	6	6
2	(Ecuador) Andrés Gómez	4	4

Final
6	(United States) Aaron Krickstein	7	3	6
3	(Argentina) José Luis Clerc	6	6	4

=== Top half ===
==== Section 1 ====
First round
Q	(United States) J Lapidus	6	1	0
(United States) T Moor	4	6	6
(Australia) T Allan	6	6
(Canada) G Michibata	2	3
Q	(United States) D Rostagno	2	6	1
10	(United States) M Dickson	6	3	6
14	(Australia) B Drewett	6	7
(Bolivia) M Martínez	1	6
Q	(South Africa) D Joubert	3	2
(Chile) H Gildemeister	6	6
(Brazil) J Soares	6	6
(Spain) G Urpí	2	3

Second round
1	(United States) J Arias	6	6
(United States) T Moor	2	3
(Australia) T Allan	3	2
10	(United States) M Dickson	6	6
14	(Australia) B Drewett	3	2
(Chile) H Gildemeister	6	6
(Brazil) J Soares	7	3	6
6	(United States) A Krickstein	6	6	7

Third round
1	(United States) J Arias	6	5	6
10	(United States) M Dickson	4	7	2
(Chile) H Gildemeister	2	4
6	(United States) A Krickstein	6	6

Quarterfinals
1	(United States) J Arias	4	3
6	(United States) A Krickstein	6	6

==== Section 2 ====
First round
(United States) B Manson	6	2	2
(Australia) J Alexander	1	6	6
(United States) R Tanner	6	3	7
Q	(United States) C Strode	3	6	6
Q	(Spain) J Arrese	2	4
12	(Spain) F Luna	6	6
15	(Brazil) C Motta	6	6
LL	(United States) B Nealon	2	3
(Czechoslovakia) P Slozil	6	6
Q	(United States) J Levine	1	0
WC	(United States) P McEnroe	7	3	4
(Paraguay) F González	6	6	6

Second round
4	(Spain) J Aguilera	3	7	5
(Australia) J Alexander	6	5	7
(United States) R Tanner	4	6	2
12	(Spain) F Luna	6	4	6
15	(Brazil) C Motta	4	3
(Czechoslovakia) P Slozil	6	6
(Paraguay) F González	3	3
8	(United States) M Purcell	6	6

Third round
(Australia) J Alexander	6	4	6
12	(Spain) F Luna	3	6	2
(Czechoslovakia) P Slozil	2	6	7
8	(United States) M Purcell	6	4	6

Quarterfinals
(Australia) J Alexander	4	4
(Czechoslovakia) P Slozil	6	6

=== Bottom half ===
==== Section 3 ====
First round
(United States) M Mitchell	6	3	2
(United States) M Leach	4	6	6
(New Zealand) D Mustard	7	2	2
(United States) B Willenborg	5	6	6
(United States) E Dibbs	3	7	2
13	(United States) J Brown	6	5	6
11	(Peru) P Arraya	6	4	6
(India) V Amritraj	4	6	2
WC	(United States) H Solomon	7	7
(Chile) R Acuña	5	6
(Socialist Federal Republic of Yugoslavia) M Ostoja	6	7
(Brazil) M Hocevar	4	5

Second round
7	(Uruguay) D Pérez	6	2
(United States) M Leach	7	6
(United States) B Willenborg	6	6
13	(United States) J Brown	1	2
11	(Peru) P Arraya	6	6
WC	(United States) H Solomon	4	0
(Socialist Federal Republic of Yugoslavia) M Ostoja	5	2
3	(Argentina) JL Clerc	7	6

Third round
(United States) M Leach	7	6	6
(United States) B Willenborg	6	7	2
11	(Peru) P Arraya	2	2
3	(Argentina) JL Clerc	6	6

Quarterfinals
(United States) M Leach	6	3
3	(Argentina) JL Clerc	7	6

==== Section 4 ====
First round
(United States) R Seguso	4	4
(Chile) P Rebolledo	6	6
(Italy) C Barazzutti	0^{r}
(United States) D Tarr	5
(United States) R Harmon	4	3
9	(Czechoslovakia) L Pimek	6	6
16	(Argentina) R Argüello	7	6
WC	(United States) T Cain	6	4
(West Germany) M Westphal	1	6	6
WC	(United States) R Brown	6	3	1
Q	(United States) E Adams	6	6
(United States) M Freeman	2	3

Second round
5	(Argentina) G Vilas	3	6	7
(Chile) P Rebolledo	6	1	6
(United States) D Tarr	3	1
9	(Czechoslovakia) L Pimek	6	6
16	(Argentina) R Argüello	6	6	0
(West Germany) M Westphal	3	7	6
Q	(United States) E Adams	0	2
2	(Ecuador) A Gómez	6	6

Third round
5	(Argentina) G Vilas	6	6
9	(Czechoslovakia) L Pimek	1	3
(West Germany) M Westphal	1	5
2	(Ecuador) A Gómez	6	7

Quarterfinals
5	(Argentina) G Vilas	7	4	4
2	(Ecuador) A Gómez	6	6	6
