= 1984 U.S. Pro Tennis Championships – Doubles =

Doubles
- 1984 U.S. Pro Tennis Championships

Final
- Champions: (United States) Ken Flach (United States) Robert Seguso
- Runners-up: (United States) Gary Donnelly (Puerto Rico) Ernie Fernández
- Score: 6–4, 6–4

Details
- Draw: 28
- Seeds: 8

Events
Singles	Doubles
← 1983 ·	U.S. Pro Tennis Championships	· 1985 →

Mark Dickson and Cássio Motta were the defending champions, but lost in the second round to Bud Cox and Danny Saltz.

Ken Flach and Robert Seguso won the title by defeating Gary Donnelly and Ernie Fernández 6–4, 6–4 in the final.

== Seeds ==
The top four seeds receive a bye into the second round.

1. (United States) Mark Dickson / (Brazil) Cássio Motta (second round)
2. (United States) Ken Flach / (United States) Robert Seguso (champions)
3. (Australia) John Alexander / (United States) Mike Leach (second round)
4. (Australia) David Graham / (Australia) Laurie Warder (semifinals)
5. (United States) Gary Donnelly / (Puerto Rico) Ernie Fernández (final)
6. (Chile) Hans Gildemeister / (Ecuador) Andrés Gómez (first round)
7. (United States) Bruce Manson / (Czechoslovakia) Pavel Složil (semifinals)
8. (United States) Mel Purcell / (United States) Vincent Van Patten (second round)

== Draw ==
=== Key ===
- Q = Qualifier
- WC = Wild card
- LL = Lucky loser
- Alt = Alternate
- SE = Special exempt
- PR = Protected ranking
- ITF = ITF entry
- JE = Junior exempt
- w/o = Walkover
- r = Retired
- d = Defaulted
- SR = Special ranking

=== Finals ===
Semifinals
7	(United States) Bruce Manson (Czechoslovakia) Pavel Složil	?
5	(United States) Gary Donnelly (Puerto Rico) Ernie Fernández	?
4	(Australia) David Graham (Australia) Laurie Warder	?
2	(United States) Ken Flach (United States) Robert Seguso	?

Final
5	(United States) Gary Donnelly (Puerto Rico) Ernie Fernández	4	4
2	(United States) Ken Flach (United States) Robert Seguso	6	6

=== Top half ===
First round
(United States) B Cox (United States) D Saltz	3	6	6
(United States) T Moor (United States) B Willenborg	6	2	1
(United States) J Arias (Peru) P Arraya	6	6	6
(Chile) P Rebolledo (Spain) G Urpí	2	7	4
(New Zealand) D Mustard (New Zealand) R Simpson	7	3	4
7	(United States) B Manson (Czechoslovakia) P Složil	6	6	6
(Chile) R Acuña (Chile) B Prajoux	7	3	7
(United States) C Strode (United States) C Wittus	5	6	5
(United States) G Layendecker (Spain) F Soler	6	6
(United States) L Davidson (United States) Weller Evans	2	3
(Brazil) M Hocevar (Brazil) J Soares	4	6	3
5	(United States) G Donnelly (Puerto Rico) E Fernández	6	4	6

Second round
1	(United States) M Dickson (Brazil) C Motta	7	3	6
(United States) B Cox (United States) D Saltz	6	6	7
(United States) J Arias (Peru) P Arraya	3	2
7	(United States) B Manson (Czechoslovakia) P Složil	6	6
3	(Australia) J Alexander (United States) M Leach	4	4
(Chile) R Acuña (Chile) B Prajoux	6	6
(United States) G Layendecker (Spain) F Soler	6	6	3
5	(United States) G Donnelly (Puerto Rico) E Fernández	7	3	6

Quarterfinals
(United States) B Cox (United States) D Saltz	4	5
7	(United States) B Manson (Czechoslovakia) P Složil	6	7
(Chile) R Acuña (Chile) B Prajoux	3	7	2
5	(United States) G Donnelly (Puerto Rico) E Fernández	6	5	6

Semifinals
7	(United States) B Manson (Czechoslovakia) P Složil	?
5	(United States) G Donnelly (Puerto Rico) E Fernández	?

=== Bottom half ===
First round
8	(United States) M Purcell (United States) V Van Patten	6	4	6
(Spain) J Aguilera (Spain) A Tous	4	6	4
(Socialist Federal Republic of Yugoslavia) M Ostoja (West Germany) W Popp	7	6
(United States) J Etterbeek (United States) A Krickstein	6	2
(United States) J Brown (United States) R Brown	6	5	7
(United States) M Freeman (United States) J Lapidus	3	7	6
6	(Chile) H Gildemeister (Ecuador) A Gómez	6	3	5
(United States) D Goldie (United States) M Kures	4	6	7
(United States) B Green (United States) B Nealon	7	6
(United States) T Cain (Canada) C Michibata	6	4
(United States) E Adams (United States) M Flur	6	5	6
(United States) B Csipkay (United States) T Csipkay	3	7	2

Second round
8	(United States) M Purcell (United States) V Van Patten	4	2
(Socialist Federal Republic of Yugoslavia) M Ostoja (West Germany) W Popp	6	6
(United States) J Brown (United States) R Brown	6	6	2
4	(Australia) D Graham (Australia) L Warder	1	7	6
(United States) D Goldie (United States) M Kures	7	5	7
(United States) B Green (United States) B Nealon	6	7	6
(United States) E Adams (United States) M Flur	7	3	4
2	(United States) K Flach (United States) R Seguso	6	6	6

Quarterfinals
(Socialist Federal Republic of Yugoslavia) M Ostoja (West Germany) W Popp	6	1	3
4	(Australia) D Graham (Australia) L Warder	4	6	6
(United States) D Goldie (United States) M Kures	6	3
2	(United States) K Flach (United States) R Seguso	7	6

Semifinals
4	(Australia) D Graham (Australia) L Warder	?
2	(United States) K Flach (United States) R Seguso	?
