= 1975 U.S. Pro Tennis Championships – Singles =

Singles
- 1975 U.S. Pro Tennis Championships

Final
- Champion: (Sweden) Björn Borg
- Runner-up: (Argentina) Guillermo Vilas
- Score: 6–3, 6–4, 6–2

Details
- Draw: 64
- Seeds: 2

Events
Singles	Doubles
- U.S. Pro Tennis Championships

The 1975 U.S. Pro Tennis Championships – Singles was an event of the 1975 U.S. Pro Tennis Championships tennis tournament and was played on outdoor green clay courts at the Longwood Cricket Club in Chestnut Hill, Massachusetts in the United States from August 19 through August 25, 1975. The draw comprised 64 players and two of them were seeded. First-seeded Björn Borg was the defending U.S. Pro Tennis Championships singles champion and retained his title by defeating second-seeded Guillermo Vilas in the final, 6–3, 6–4, 6–2.

== Seeds ==
1. (Argentina) Guillermo Vilas (final)
2. (Sweden) Björn Borg (champion)

Click on the seed number of a player to go to their draw section.

== Draw ==
Key

- Q = Qualifier
- WC = Wild card
- LL = Lucky loser
- Alt = Alternate
- ITF = ITF entry
- PR = Protected ranking
- SR = Special ranking
- SE = Special exempt
- JE = Junior exempt
- JR = Junior Accelerator Programme entrant
- CO = College Accelerator Programme entrant
- NG = Next Gen Accelerator Program entrant
- w/o = Walkover
- r = Retired
- d = Defaulted

=== Finals ===
Quarterfinals
1	(Argentina) Guillermo Vilas	6	6
(Australia) Rod Laver	3	4
(United States) Arthur Ashe	7	6
(Poland) Wojciech Fibak	5	4
(Australia) John Alexander	6	2	7
(Spain) Manuel Orantes	3	6	6
(Mexico) Raúl Ramírez	6	3	0
2	(Sweden) Björn Borg	4	6	6

Semifinals
1	(Argentina) Guillermo Vilas	4	6	6
(United States) Arthur Ashe	6	3	0
(Australia) John Alexander	3	7	3
2	(Sweden) Björn Borg	6	6	6

Final
1	(Argentina) Guillermo Vilas	3	4	2
2	(Sweden) Björn Borg	6	6	6

=== Top half ===
==== Section 1 ====
First Round
1	(Argentina) Guillermo Vilas	6	7
(Spain) José Higueras	2	5
(Italy) Paolo Bertolucci	3	7	6
(Australia) Paul Kronk	6	5	2
(Spain) Juan Gisbert Sr.	2	6	7
(United States) Brian Gottfried	6	3	6
(United States) Mike Estep	6	2	6
(France) Georges Goven	4	6	3
(Australia) Rod Laver	7	6	6
(France) Patrick Proisy	5	7	0
(Italy) Adriano Panatta	6	6
(South Africa) John Eagleton	2	3
(Czechoslovakia) Jan Kodeš	6	6
(France) Patrice Dominguez	2	4
(United States) Ferdi Taygan	6	6
(United States) John Whitlinger	3	3

Second Round
1	(Argentina) Guillermo Vilas	6	6
(Italy) Paolo Bertolucci	3	4
(Spain) Juan Gisbert Sr.	0	6	0
(United States) Mike Estep	6	4	6
(Australia) Rod Laver	7	6
(Italy) Adriano Panatta	6	2
(Czechoslovakia) Jan Kodeš	6	2	6
(United States) Ferdi Taygan	4	6	3

Third Round
1	(Argentina) Guillermo Vilas	6	6
(United States) Mike Estep	4	3
(Australia) Rod Laver	6	6
(Czechoslovakia) Jan Kodeš	1	0

Quarterfinals
1	(Argentina) Guillermo Vilas	6	6
(Australia) Rod Laver	3	4

==== Section 2 ====
First Round
(United States) Arthur Ashe	6	6
(United States) John Andrews	4	3
(United Kingdom) Buster Mottram	6	3	6
(Colombia) Iván Molina	1	6	2
(United States) Stan Smith	6	6	6
(West Germany) Hans-Joachim Plötz	3	7	1
(Chile) Jaime Fillol	6	6
(United States) Mike Cahill	1	4
(Poland) Wojciech Fibak	4	6	6
(United States) Roscoe Tanner	6	3	2
(Austria) Hans Kary	6	7
(United Kingdom) Graham Stilwell	4	6
(United States) Jim Delaney	6	4	7
(New Zealand) Onny Parun	1	6	6
(West Germany) Jürgen Fassbender	6	5	6
(Australia) Bob Carmichael	1	7	3

Second Round
(United States) Arthur Ashe	6	6
(United Kingdom) Buster Mottram	3	4
(United States) Stan Smith	4	6
(Chile) Jaime Fillol	6	7
(Poland) Wojciech Fibak	6	6
(Austria) Hans Kary	2	1
(United States) Jim Delaney	3	7	6
(West Germany) Jürgen Fassbender	6	6	4

Third Round
(United States) Arthur Ashe	6	6
(Chile) Jaime Fillol	4	2
(Poland) Wojciech Fibak	6	6
(United States) Jim Delaney	1	3

Quarterfinals
(United States) Arthur Ashe	7	6
(Poland) Wojciech Fibak	5	4

=== Bottom half ===
==== Section 3 ====
First Round
(West Germany) Karl Meiler	6	6
(Socialist Federal Republic of Yugoslavia) Željko Franulović	2	3
(United States) Bob Lutz	6	6
(Chile) Patricio Cornejo	1	4
(France) François Jauffret	6	6
(Czechoslovakia) František Pála	4	4
(Australia) John Alexander	7	6
(United States) Charlie Pasarell	6	2
(South Africa) Cliff Drysdale	6	6
(United Kingdom) Colin Dowdeswell	3	3
(United States) Cliff Richey	7	6	6
(Czechoslovakia) Milan Holeček	6	7	4
(Australia) Phil Dent	6	6
(United Kingdom) John Feaver	3	4
(Spain) Manuel Orantes	6	6
(Colombia) Jairo Velasco Sr.	3	0

Second Round
(West Germany) Karl Meiler	3	6	4
(United States) Bob Lutz	6	3	6
(France) François Jauffret	1	4
(Australia) John Alexander	6	6
(South Africa) Cliff Drysdale	2	6	6
(United States) Cliff Richey	6	3	4
(Australia) Phil Dent	1	2
(Spain) Manuel Orantes	6	6

Third Round
(United States) Bob Lutz	6	6	3
(Australia) John Alexander	1	7	6
(South Africa) Cliff Drysdale
(Spain) Manuel Orantes	w/o

Quarterfinals
(Australia) John Alexander	6	2	7
(Spain) Manuel Orantes	3	6	6

==== Section 4 ====
First Round
(Spain) Antonio Muñoz	6	6	6
(West Germany) Ulrich Pinner	2	7	2
(United States) Harold Solomon	6	6
(United States) Jim McManus	2	1
(Argentina) Ricardo Cano	7	6
(Japan) Jun Kamiwazumi	5	4
(Mexico) Raúl Ramírez	6	6
(United States) Billy Martin	4	3
(Paraguay) Víctor Pecci	7	6
(Czechoslovakia) Jiří Hřebec	6	2
(United States) Dick Stockton	6	7
(United States) Erik van Dillen	2	6
(United States) Eddie Dibbs	6	6
(France) Jean-François Caujolle	4	0
(West Germany) Hans-Jürgen Pohmann	2	5
2	(Sweden) Björn Borg	6	7

Second Round
(Spain) Antonio Muñoz	2	6	0
(United States) Harold Solomon	6	2	6
(Argentina) Ricardo Cano	1	2
(Mexico) Raúl Ramírez	6	6
(Paraguay) Víctor Pecci	6	6	6
(United States) Dick Stockton	3	7	7
(United States) Eddie Dibbs	1	5
2	(Sweden) Björn Borg	6	7

Third Round
(United States) Harold Solomon	1	5
(Mexico) Raúl Ramírez	6	7
(United States) Dick Stockton	4	4
2	(Sweden) Björn Borg	6	6

Quarterfinals
(Mexico) Raúl Ramírez	6	3	0
2	(Sweden) Björn Borg	4	6	6
