= 1985 U.S. Pro Tennis Championships – Doubles =

Doubles
- 1985 U.S. Pro Tennis Championships

Final
- Champions: (Czechoslovakia) Libor Pimek (Socialist Federal Republic of Yugoslavia) Slobodan Živojinović
- Runners-up: (Australia) Peter McNamara (Australia) Paul McNamee
- Score: 2–6, 6–4, 7–6^{(8–6)}

Details
- Draw: 28
- Seeds: 8

Events
Singles	Doubles
← 1984 ·	U.S. Pro Tennis Championships	· 1986 →

Ken Flach and Robert Seguso were the defending champions, but none competed this year. Seguso chose to compete at Newport during the same week, reaching the quarterfinals.

Libor Pimek and Slobodan Živojinović won the title by defeating Peter McNamara and Paul McNamee 2–6, 6–4, 7–6^{(8–6)} in the final.

== Seeds ==
The top four seeds received a bye to the second round.

1. (Czechoslovakia) Pavel Složil / (Australia) Kim Warwick (quarterfinals)
2. (Chile) Hans Gildemeister / (Paraguay) Víctor Pecci (second round)
3. (Switzerland) Jakob Hlasek / (Hungary) Balázs Taróczy (quarterfinals)
4. (United States) Mike De Palmer / (United States) Gary Donnelly (quarterfinals)
5. (Australia) Michael Fancutt / (United States) Tim Wilkison (semifinals)
6. (Czechoslovakia) Libor Pimek / (Socialist Federal Republic of Yugoslavia) Slobodan Živojinović (champions)
7. (Australia) Peter McNamara / (Australia) Paul McNamee (final)
8. (India) Anand Amritraj / (New Zealand) Chris Lewis (second round)

== Draw ==
=== Key ===
- Q = Qualifier
- WC = Wild card
- LL = Lucky loser
- Alt = Alternate
- SE = Special exempt
- PR = Protected ranking
- ITF = ITF entry
- JE = Junior exempt
- w/o = Walkover
- r = Retired
- d = Defaulted
- SR = Special ranking

=== Finals ===
Semifinals
7	(Australia) Peter McNamara (Australia) Paul McNamee	3	6	6
5	(Australia) Michael Fancutt (United States) Tim Wilkison	6	2	3
(United States) John Ross (United States) Blaine Willenborg	4	7	1
6	(Czechoslovakia) Libor Pimek (Socialist Federal Republic of Yugoslavia) Slobodan Živojinović	6	6	6

Final
7	(Australia) Peter McNamara (Australia) Paul McNamee	6	4	6^{6}
6	(Czechoslovakia) Libor Pimek (Socialist Federal Republic of Yugoslavia) Slobodan Živojinović	2	6	7^{8}

=== Top half ===
First round
(Spain) J Avendaño (Argentina) M Ingaramo	6	5
(Ecuador) A Gómez (Ecuador) R Ycaza	7	7
(Argentina) E Bengoechea (Spain) J López-Maeso	2	0
(United States) J Levine (United States) D Tarr	6	6
(United States) D Goldie (United States) R Harmon	2	6
7	(Australia) P MaNamara (Australia) P McNamee	6	7
(Spain) J Arrese (Spain) A Tous	2	3
(Peru) P Arraya (United States) E Fromm	6	6
(Nigeria) T Mmoh (Finland) L Palin	6	6
(Sweden) H Sundström (Argentina) G Vilas	3	4
(United States) J Brown (United States) R Brown	2	2
5	(Australia) M Fancutt (United States) T Wilkison	6	6

Second round
1	(Czechoslovakia) P Složil (Australia) K Warwick	w/o
(Ecuador) A Gómez (Ecuador) R Ycaza
(United States) J Levine (United States) D Tarr	4	6
7	(Australia) P MaNamara (Australia) P McNamee	6	7
3	(Switzerland) J Hlasek (Hungary) B Taróczy	6	6
(Peru) P Arraya (United States) E Fromm	3	3
(Nigeria) T Mmoh (Finland) L Palin	4	3
5	(Australia) M Fancutt (United States) T Wilkison	6	6

Quarterfinals
1	(Czechoslovakia) P Složil (Australia) K Warwick	4	6
7	(Australia) P MaNamara (Australia) P McNamee	6	7
3	(Switzerland) J Hlasek (Hungary) B Taróczy	3	4
5	(Australia) M Fancutt (United States) T Wilkison	6	6

Semifinals
7	(Australia) P MaNamara (Australia) P McNamee	3	6	6
5	(Australia) M Fancutt (United States) T Wilkison	6	2	3

=== Bottom half ===
First round
8	(India) A Amritraj (New Zealand) C Lewis	6	6	7
(Uruguay) D Pérez (Spain) G Urpí	7	3	5
(Czechoslovakia) S Birner (Czechoslovakia) J Navrátil	6	2
(United States) J Ross (United States) B Willenborg	7	6
(United States) R Baxter (United States) J Manset	6	7
(United States) J Arias (United States) E Korita	4	6
6	(Czechoslovakia) L Pimek (Socialist Federal Republic of Yugoslavia) S Živojinović	6	6	6
(United States) R Nixon (United States) B Schultz	7	0	2
(United States) E Adams (United States) M Wooldridge	5	3
(Argentina) A Ganzábal (Italy) C Panatta	7	6
(Spain) J Aguilera (Argentina) M Jaite	6	5
(Australia) D Graham (Australia) L Warder	7	7

Second round
8	(India) A Amritraj (New Zealand) C Lewis	6	3	5
(United States) J Ross (United States) B Willenborg	3	6	7
(United States) R Baxter (United States) J Manset	4	4
4	(United States) M De Palmer (United States) G Donnelly	6	6
6	(Czechoslovakia) L Pimek (Socialist Federal Republic of Yugoslavia) S Živojinović	6	3	6
(Argentina) A Ganzábal (Italy) C Panatta	4	6	2
(Australia) D Graham (Australia) L Warder	4	6	6
2	(Chile) H Gildemeister (Paraguay) V Pecci	6	3	0

Quarterfinals
(United States) J Ross (United States) B Willenborg	6	6
4	(United States) M De Palmer (United States) G Donnelly	2	1
6	(Czechoslovakia) L Pimek (Socialist Federal Republic of Yugoslavia) S Živojinović	7	6
(Australia) D Graham (Australia) L Warder	5	2

Semifinals
(United States) J Ross (United States) B Willenborg	4	7	1
6	(Czechoslovakia) L Pimek (Socialist Federal Republic of Yugoslavia) S Živojinović	6	6	6
