= 1985 U.S. Pro Tennis Championships – Singles =

Singles
- 1985 U.S. Pro Tennis Championships

Final
- Champion: (Sweden) Mats Wilander
- Runner-up: (Argentina) Martín Jaite
- Score: 6–2, 6–4

Details
- Draw: 56 (5WC/7Q/1LL)
- Seeds: 16

Events
Singles	Doubles
← 1984 ·	U.S. Pro Tennis Championships	· 1986 →

Aaron Krickstein was the defending champion, but lost in the second round to Guillermo Vilas.

Mats Wilander won the title by defeating Martín Jaite 6–2, 6–4 in the final.

== Seeds ==
The top eight seeds received a bye to the second round.

1. (Sweden) Mats Wilander (champion)
2. (n/a)
3. (Czechoslovakia) Miloslav Mečíř (third round)
4. (United States) Aaron Krickstein (second round)
5. (Sweden) Henrik Sundström (quarterfinals)
6. (Argentina) José Luis Clerc (second round)
7. (United States) Jimmy Arias (second round)
8. (Czechoslovakia) Libor Pimek (quarterfinals)
9. (Paraguay) Víctor Pecci (first round)
10. (Italy) Francesco Cancellotti (second round)
11. (Argentina) Martín Jaite (final)
12. (Spain) José Higueras (first round)
13. (United States) Tim Wilkison (third round)
14. (West Germany) Hans Schwaier (second round)
15. (United States) Lawson Duncan (first round)
16. (Switzerland) Jakob Hlasek (second round)

== Draw ==
=== Key ===
- Q = Qualifier
- WC = Wild card
- LL = Lucky loser
- Alt = Alternate
- SE = Special exempt
- PR = Protected ranking
- ITF = ITF entry
- JE = Junior exempt
- w/o = Walkover
- r = Retired
- d = Defaulted
- SR = Special ranking

=== Finals ===
Quarterfinals
1	(Sweden) Mats Wilander	6	6
5	(Sweden) Henrik Sundström	3	4
(Argentina) Guillermo Vilas	6	6
8	(Czechoslovakia) Libor Pimek	4	2
Q	(Socialist Federal Republic of Yugoslavia) Bruno Orešar	6	7
(Spain) Juan Aguilera	3	5
(Australia) Paul McNamee	6	2	0
11	(Argentina) Martín Jaite	2	6	6

Semifinals
1	(Sweden) Mats Wilander	6	6
(Argentina) Guillermo Vilas	1	3
Q	(Socialist Federal Republic of Yugoslavia) Bruno Orešar	6	1
11	(Argentina) Martín Jaite	7	6

Final
1	(Sweden) Mats Wilander	6	6
11	(Argentina) Martín Jaite	2	4

=== Top half ===
==== Section 1 ====
First round
(Chile) H Gildemeister	7	6	6
(Czechoslovakia) K Navrátil	6	7	3
Q	(Sweden) S Eriksson	6	6
(Argentina) M Ingaramo	4	4
(Australia) J Frawley	7	6
9	(Paraguay) V Pecci	5	3
12	(Spain) J Higueras	4	2
(United States) J Brown	6	6
(United States) B Schultz	6	6	5
(United States) R Harmon	7	0	7
Q	(Austria) T Muster	7	6
(Argentina) E Bengoechea	6	1

Second round
1	(Sweden) M Wilander	6	7
(Chile) H Gildemeister	2	6
Q	(Sweden) S Eriksson	6	6
(Australia) J Frawley	4	2
(United States) J Brown	6	6
(United States) R Harmon	1	0
Q	(Austria) T Muster	6	2	1
5	(Sweden) H Sundström	4	6	6

Third round
1	(Sweden) M Wilander	6	6
Q	(Sweden) S Eriksson	1	2
(United States) J Brown	7	3	1
5	(Sweden) H Sundström	6	6	6

Quarterfinals
1	(Sweden) M Wilander	6	6
5	(Sweden) H Sundström	3	4

==== Section 2 ====
First round
(Uruguay) D Pérez	3	2
(Argentina) G Vilas	6	6
(United States) D Goldie	3	2
(New Zealand) C Lewis	6	6
(Peru) P Arraya	7	6
15	(United States) L Duncan	5	2
13	(United States) T Wilkison	6	6	6
(Socialist Federal Republic of Yugoslavia) S Živojinović	7	3	4
(Haiti) R Agénor	2	7	7
(Italy) C Panatta	6	5	6
(Spain) F Luna	5	3
(Argentina) H de la Peña	7	6

Second round
4	(United States) A Krickstein	6	1
(Argentina) G Vilas	7	6
(New Zealand) C Lewis	2	6
(Peru) P Arraya	6	7
13	(United States) T Wilkison	6	6
(Haiti) R Agénor	2	3
(Argentina) H de la Peña	7	2	4
8	(Czechoslovakia) L Pimek	6	6	6

Third round
(Argentina) G Vilas	6	6
(Peru) P Arraya	4	2
13	(United States) T Wilkison	6	1	2
8	(Czechoslovakia) L Pimek	4	6	6

Quarterfinals
(Argentina) G Vilas	6	6
8	(Czechoslovakia) L Pimek	4	2

=== Bottom half ===
==== Section 3 ====
First round
(Argentina) A Ganzábal	1	6	2
Q	(Socialist Federal Republic of Yugoslavia) B Orešar	6	4	6
(Hungary) B Taróczy	4	4
(Argentina) R Argüello	6	6
WC	(United States) P McEnroe	5	6	4
14	(West Germany) H Schwaier	7	2	6
10	(Italy) F Cancellotti	6	6
(Spain) J López-Maeso	3	2
WC	(United States) R Brown	4	2
(Spain) J Aguilera	6	6
WC	(Sweden) M Pernfors	6	3	6
Q	(United States) J Berger	3	6	2

Second round
7	(United States) J Arias	6	6
Q	(Socialist Federal Republic of Yugoslavia) B Orešar	7	7
(Argentina) R Argüello	6	7
14	(West Germany) H Schwaier	1	5
10	(Italy) F Cancellotti	5	6	5
(Spain) J Aguilera	7	4	7
WC	(Sweden) M Pernfors	3	4
3	(Czechoslovakia) M Mečíř	6	6

Third round
Q	(Socialist Federal Republic of Yugoslavia) B Orešar	6	6
(Argentina) R Argüello	3	2
(Spain) J Aguilera	6	3	6
3	(Czechoslovakia) M Mečíř	4	6	4

Quarterfinals
Q	(Socialist Federal Republic of Yugoslavia) B Orešar	6	7
(Spain) J Aguilera	3	5

==== Section 4 ====
First round
Q	(Spain) J Avendaño	0	2
(France) T Tulasne	6	6
(Argentina) G Rivas	4	1
(Australia) P NcNamee	6	6
(West Germany) M Westphal	6	4
16	(Switzerland) J Hlasek	7	6
11	(Argentina) M Jaite	7	6
Q	(United States) J Levine	6	0
Q	(United States) M Buckley	6	6	5
WC	(United States) E Korita	7	3	7
(Czechoslovakia) P Složil	4	3
WC	(United States) H Solomon	6	6

Second round
6	(Argentina) JL Clerc	3	4
(France) T Tulasne	6	6
(Australia) P NcNamee	6	2	6
16	(Switzerland) J Hlasek	3	6	2
11	(Argentina) M Jaite	6	6
WC	(United States) E Korita	4	3
WC	(United States) H Solomon	6	6
LL	(Czechoslovakia) S Birner	1	0

Third round
(France) T Tulasne	3	6	4
(Australia) P NcNamee	6	2	6
11	(Argentina) M Jaite	6	7
WC	(United States) H Solomon	2	5

Quarterfinals
(Australia) P NcNamee	6	2	0
11	(Argentina) M Jaite	2	6	6
