= 1975 U.S. Pro Tennis Championships – Doubles =

Doubles
- 1975 U.S. Pro Tennis Championships

Final
- Champion: (United States) Brian Gottfried (Mexico) Raúl Ramírez
- Runner-up: (United States) John Andrews (United States) Mike Estep
- Score: 4–6, 6–3, 7–6

Details
- Draw: 32
- Seeds: 8

Events
| Singles | Doubles |
- U.S. Pro Tennis Championships

The 1975 U.S. Pro Tennis Championships – Doubles was an event of the 1975 U.S. Pro Tennis Championships tennis tournament and was played on outdoor green clay courts at the Longwood Cricket Club in Chestnut Hill, Massachusetts in the United States from August 20 through August 26, 1975. The draw comprised 32 teams of which two were seeded. Bob Lutz and Stan Smith were the defending U.S. Pro Tennis Championships doubles champions but lost in the first round. Second-seeded team of Brian Gottfried and Raúl Ramírez won the title by defeating the unseeded team of John Andrews and Mike Estep in the final, 4–6, 6–3, 7–6.

== Seeds ==
1. (United States) Eddie Dibbs / (United States) Harold Solomon (quarterfinals)
2. (United States) Brian Gottfried / (Mexico) Raúl Ramírez (champions)

== Draw ==
Key

- Q = Qualifier
- WC = Wild card
- LL = Lucky loser
- Alt = Alternate
- ITF = ITF entry
- PR = Protected ranking
- SR = Special ranking
- SE = Special exempt
- JE = Junior exempt
- JR = Junior Accelerator Programme entrant
- CO = College Accelerator Programme entrant
- NG = Next Gen Accelerator Program entrant
- w/o = Walkover
- r = Retired
- d = Defaulted

=== Finals ===
Semifinals
(United States) John Andrews (United States) Mike Estep | 3 | 7 | 6
(West Germany) Jürgen Fassbender (West Germany) Hans-Jürgen Pohmann | 6 | 6 | 4
(Poland) Wojciech Fibak (United Kingdom) Buster Mottram | 3 | 2
2 | (United States) Brian Gottfried (Mexico) Raúl Ramírez | 6 | 6

Final
(United States) John Andrews (United States) Mike Estep | 6 | 3 | 6
2 | (United States) Brian Gottfried (Mexico) Raúl Ramírez | 4 | 6 | 7

=== Top half ===
First Round
1 | (United States) Eddie Dibbs (United States) Harold Solomon | 4 | 6 | 6
(Spain) Juan Gisbert Sr. (Spain) Manuel Orantes | 6 | 0 | 3
(Austria) Hans Kary (France) Patrick Proisy | 6 | 6
(United States) Billy Martin (United States) Ferdi Taygan | 4 | 4
(United States) John Andrews (United States) Mike Estep | w | o
(Italy) Paolo Bertolucci (Italy) Adriano Panatta
(United States) Charlie Pasarell (United States) Roscoe Tanner | 6 | 6
(United States) Jerry Cromwell (United States) Paul Sullivan | 3 | 3
(West Germany) Jürgen Fassbender (West Germany) Hans-Jürgen Pohmann | 6 | 6
(United States) Bob Lutz (United States) Stan Smith | 3 | 3
(Australia) Bob Carmichael (South Africa) Cliff Drysdale | 7 | 6
(United States) Bill Drake (United States) Chauncey Steele III | 6 | 3
(France) Patrice Dominguez (France) François Jauffret | 6 | 6
(Socialist Federal Republic of Yugoslavia) Željko Franulović (New Zealand) Onny Parun | 4 | 2
(Argentina) Lito Álvarez (Paraguay) Víctor Pecci | 7 | 6
(United Kingdom) Gerald Battrick (United Kingdom) Graham Stilwell | 5 | 3

Second Round
1 | (United States) Eddie Dibbs (United States) Harold Solomon | 7 | 4 | 6
(Austria) Hans Kary (France) Patrick Proisy | 5 | 6 | 4
(United States) John Andrews (United States) Mike Estep | 6 | 6
(United States) Charlie Pasarell (United States) Roscoe Tanner | 4 | 4
(West Germany) Jürgen Fassbender (West Germany) Hans-Jürgen Pohmann | 6 | 4 | 6
(Australia) Bob Carmichael (South Africa) Cliff Drysdale | 4 | 6 | 3
(France) Patrice Dominguez (France) François Jauffret | 5 | 6
(Argentina) Lito Álvarez (Paraguay) Víctor Pecci | 7 | 7

Quarterfinals
1 | (United States) Eddie Dibbs (United States) Harold Solomon | 3 | 6 | 3
(United States) John Andrews (United States) Mike Estep | 6 | 2 | 6
(West Germany) Jürgen Fassbender (West Germany) Hans-Jürgen Pohmann | 4 | 6 | 6
(Argentina) Lito Álvarez (Paraguay) Víctor Pecci | 6 | 3 | 4

Semifinals
(United States) John Andrews (United States) Mike Estep | 3 | 7 | 6
(West Germany) Jürgen Fassbender (West Germany) Hans-Jürgen Pohmann | 6 | 6 | 4

=== Bottom half ===
First Round
(Colombia) Álvaro Betancur (Chile) Álvaro Fillol | 3 | 6 | 6
(United Kingdom) John Feaver (United Kingdom) Mark Farrell | 6 | 1 | 4
(Poland) Wojciech Fibak (United Kingdom) Buster Mottram | 1 | 6 | 6
(United Kingdom) Colin Dowdeswell (South Africa) John Eagleton | 6 | 4 | 2
(United States) Arthur Ashe (United States) Dennis Ralston | 7 | 7
(United States) Mike Cahill (United States) John Whitlinger | 6 | 6
(Sweden) Björn Borg (Australia) Rod Laver | 3 | 6 | 7
(Australia) John Alexander (Australia) Phil Dent | 6 | 3 | 5
(United States) Dick Stockton (United States) Erik van Dillen | 7 | 6
(Colombia) Iván Molina (Colombia) Jairo Velasco Sr. | 6 | 4
(Czechoslovakia) Jiří Hřebec (Czechoslovakia) Jan Kodeš | 7 | 6
(Spain) José Higueras (Spain) Antonio Muñoz | 6 | 1
(Czechoslovakia) Milan Holeček (West Germany) Karl Meiler | 6 | 6
(United States) Jim McManus (Czechoslovakia) František Pála | 3 | 4
(Chile) Patricio Cornejo (Chile) Jaime Fillol | 4 | 6
2 | (United States) Brian Gottfried (Mexico) Raúl Ramírez | 6 | 7

Second Round
(Colombia) Álvaro Betancur (Chile) Álvaro Fillol | 3 | 2
(Poland) Wojciech Fibak (United Kingdom) Buster Mottram | 6 | 6
(United States) Arthur Ashe (United States) Dennis Ralston | 6 | 3 | 4
(Sweden) Björn Borg (Australia) Rod Laver | 4 | 6 | 6
(United States) Dick Stockton (United States) Erik van Dillen | 6 | 7
(Czechoslovakia) Jiří Hřebec (Czechoslovakia) Jan Kodeš | 0 | 6
(Czechoslovakia) Milan Holeček (West Germany) Karl Meiler | 2 | 2
2 | (United States) Brian Gottfried (Mexico) Raúl Ramírez | 6 | 6

Quarterfinals
(Poland) Wojciech Fibak (United Kingdom) Buster Mottram | 7 | 7
(Sweden) Björn Borg (Australia) Rod Laver | 5 | 6
(United States) Dick Stockton (United States) Erik van Dillen | 3 | 3
2 | (United States) Brian Gottfried (Mexico) Raúl Ramírez | 6 | 6

Semifinals
(Poland) Wojciech Fibak (United Kingdom) Buster Mottram | 3 | 2
2 | (United States) Brian Gottfried (Mexico) Raúl Ramírez | 6 | 6
