= 1980 U.S. Pro Tennis Championships =

- Date: July 14–20
- Edition: 53rd
- Category: Grand Prix
- Draw: 64S / 32D
- Prize money: $175,000
- Surface: Clay / outdoor
- Location: Chestnut Hill, Massachusetts
- Venue: Longwood Cricket Club

Champions

Singles
- (United States) Eddie Dibbs

Doubles
- (United States) Sandy Mayer / (United States) Gene Mayer
- U.S. Pro Tennis Championships

The 1980 U.S. Pro Tennis Championships was a men's tennis tournament played on outdoor green clay courts at the Longwood Cricket Club in Chestnut Hill, Massachusetts in the United States. The event was part of the 1980 Volvo Grand Prix circuit. It was the 53rd edition of the tournament and was held from July 14 through July 20, 1980. Fourth-seeded Eddie Dibbs won the singles title.

== Finals ==
=== Singles ===
(United States) Eddie Dibbs defeated (United States) Gene Mayer 6–2, 6–1

- It was Dibbs' 2nd singles title of the year and the 20th of his career.

=== Doubles ===
(United States) Sandy Mayer / (United States) Gene Mayer defeated (Chile) Hans Gildemeister / (Ecuador) Andrés Gómez 1–6, 6–4, 6–4
