= 1981 U.S. Pro Tennis Championships =

- Date: July 13–19
- Edition: 54th
- Category: Grand Prix (Super Series)
- Draw: 64S / 32D
- Prize money: $175,000
- Surface: Clay / outdoor
- Location: Chestnut Hill, Massachusetts
- Venue: Longwood Cricket Club

Champions

Singles
- (Argentina) José Luis Clerc

Doubles
- (Czechoslovakia) Pavel Složil / (Mexico) Raúl Ramírez
- U.S. Pro Tennis Championships

The 1981 U.S. Pro Tennis Championships was a men's tennis tournament played on outdoor green clay courts at the Longwood Cricket Club in Chestnut Hill, Massachusetts in the United States. The event was part of the Super Series of the 1981 Volvo Grand Prix circuit. It was the 54th edition of the tournament and was held from July 13 through July 19, 1981. First-seeded José Luis Clerc won the singles title.

== Finals ==
=== Singles ===
(Argentina) José Luis Clerc defeated (Chile) Hans Gildemeister 0–6, 6–2, 6–2

- It was Clerc' 3rd singles title of the year and the 13th of his career.

=== Doubles ===
(Czechoslovakia) Pavel Složil / (Mexico) Raúl Ramírez defeated (Chile) Hans Gildemeister / (Ecuador) Andrés Gómez 6–4, 7–6
