= 1983 U.S. Pro Tennis Championships =

- Date: July 11–17
- Edition: 56th
- Category: Grand Prix (Super Series)
- Draw: 64S / 32D
- Prize money: $200,000
- Surface: Clay / outdoor
- Location: Chestnut Hill, Massachusetts
- Venue: Longwood Cricket Club

Champions

Singles
- (Argentina) José Luis Clerc

Doubles
- (United States) Mark Dickson / (Brazil) Cássio Motta
← 1982 ·	U.S. Pro Tennis Championships	· 1984 →

The 1983 U.S. Pro Tennis Championships was a men's tennis tournament played on outdoor green clay courts at the Longwood Cricket Club in Chestnut Hill, Massachusetts in the United States. The event was part of the Super Series of the 1983 Volvo Grand Prix circuit. It was the 56th edition of the tournament and was held from July 11 through July 17, 1983. Second-seeded José Luis Clerc won the singles title, his second at the event after 1981.

== Finals ==
=== Singles ===
(Argentina) José Luis Clerc defeated (United States) Jimmy Arias 6–3, 6–1

- It was Clerc's 4th singles title of the year and the 16th of his career.

=== Doubles ===
(United States) Mark Dickson / (Brazil) Cássio Motta defeated (Chile) Hans Gildemeister / (Chile) Belus Prajoux 7–5, 6–3
