= 1979 U.S. Pro Tennis Championships =

- Date: August 20–26
- Edition: 52nd
- Category: Grand Prix
- Draw: 64S / 32D
- Prize money: $175,000
- Surface: Clay / outdoor
- Location: Chestnut Hill, Massachusetts
- Venue: Longwood Cricket Club

Champions

Singles
- (Spain) José Higueras

Doubles
- (Australia) Syd Ball / (New Zealand) Kim Warwick (Switzerland) Heinz Günthardt / (Czechoslovakia) Pavel Složil
- U.S. Pro Tennis Championships

The 1979 U.S. Pro Tennis Championships was a men's tennis tournament played on outdoor green clay courts (Har-Tru) at the Longwood Cricket Club in Chestnut Hill, Massachusetts, United States. The event was part of the 1979 Grand Prix circuit. It was the 52nd edition of the tournament and was held from August 20 through August 26, 1979. First-seeded José Higueras won the singles title and the accompanying $24,500 first-prize money. The doubles final was not played due to rain.

== Finals ==
=== Singles ===
(Spain) José Higueras defeated (Chile) Hans Gildemeister 6–3, 6–1

- It was Higueras' 3rd singles title of the year and the 9th of his career.

=== Doubles ===
(Australia) Syd Ball / (New Zealand) Kim Warwick vs. (Switzerland) Heinz Günthardt / (Czechoslovakia) Pavel Složil Not Played
