= 1975 U.S. Pro Tennis Championships =

- Date: August 19–25
- Edition: 48th
- Category: Grand Prix (Group AA)
- Draw: 64S / 32D
- Prize money: $100,000
- Surface: Clay / outdoor
- Location: Chestnut Hill, Massachusetts
- Venue: Longwood Cricket Club

Champions

Singles
- (Sweden) Björn Borg

Doubles
- (United States) Brian Gottfried / (Mexico) Raúl Ramírez
- U.S. Pro Tennis Championships

The 1975 U.S. Pro Tennis Championships was a men's tennis tournament played on outdoor green clay courts (Har-Tru) at the Longwood Cricket Club in Chestnut Hill, Massachusetts in the United States. It was classified as a Group AA category tournament and was part of the 1975 Grand Prix circuit. It was the 48th edition of the tournament and was held from August 19 through August 25, 1975. Second-seeded and defending champion Björn Borg won the singles title and the accompanying $16,000 first prize money. The tournament started a day late due to rain.

== Finals ==
=== Singles ===
(Sweden) Björn Borg defeated (Argentina) Guillermo Vilas 6–3, 6–4, 6–2

- It was Borg's 4th singles title of the year and the 12th of his career.

=== Doubles ===
(United States) Brian Gottfried / (Mexico) Raúl Ramírez defeated (United States) John Andrews / (United States) Mike Estep 4–6, 6–3, 7–6
