= 1985 U.S. Pro Tennis Championships =

- Date: July 8–15
- Edition: 58th
- Category: Grand Prix
- Draw: 56S / 28D
- Prize money: $210,000
- Surface: Clay / outdoor
- Location: Chestnut Hill, Massachusetts
- Venue: Longwood Cricket Club

Champions

Singles
- (Sweden) Mats Wilander

Doubles
- (Czechoslovakia) Libor Pimek / (Socialist Federal Republic of Yugoslavia) Slobodan Živojinović
- U.S. Pro Tennis Championships

The 1985 U.S. Pro Tennis Championships, also known by its sponsored name Union Warren Bank U.S. Pro Tennis Championships, was a men's tennis tournament played on outdoor green clay courts at the Longwood Cricket Club in Chestnut Hill, Massachusetts in the United States. The event was part of the Super Series of the 1985 Nabisco Grand Prix circuit. It was the 58th edition of the tournament and was held from July 8 through July 15, 1985. First-seeded Mats Wilander won the singles title and earned $35,700 first-prize money.

== Finals ==
=== Singles ===
(Sweden) Mats Wilander defeated (Argentina) Martín Jaite 6–2, 6–4

- It was Wilander's second singles title of the year and the 18th of his career.

=== Doubles ===
(Czechoslovakia) Libor Pimek / (Socialist Federal Republic of Yugoslavia) Slobodan Živojinović defeated (Australia) Peter McNamara / (Australia) Paul McNamee 2–6, 6–4, 7–6^{(8–6)}
