= 1977 U.S. Pro Tennis Championships =

- Date: August 22–30
- Edition: 50th
- Category: Grand Prix (4 Star)
- Draw: 64S/32D
- Prize money: $125,000
- Surface: Clay / outdoor
- Location: Chestnut Hill, Massachusetts
- Venue: Longwood Cricket Club

Champions

Singles
- (Spain) Manuel Orantes

Doubles
- (United States) Bob Lutz / (United States) Stan Smith
- U.S. Pro Tennis Championships

The 1977 U.S. Pro Tennis Championships was a men's tennis tournament played on outdoor green clay courts (Har-Tru) at the Longwood Cricket Club in Chestnut Hill, Massachusetts in the United States. The event was categorized as a 4 Star tournament and was part of the 1977 Grand Prix circuit. It was the 50th edition of the tournament and was held from August 22 through August 30, 1977. Third-seeded Manuel Orantes won the singles title and the accompanying $32,000 first-prize money as well as 125 Grand Prix ranking points. First-seeded Jimmy Connors withdrew after the quarterfinals due to a back injury.

== Finals ==
=== Singles ===
(Spain) Manuel Orantes defeated (United States) Eddie Dibbs 7–6, 7–5, 6–4

- It was Orantes' 2nd singles title of the year and the 31st of his career.

=== Doubles ===
(United States) Bob Lutz / (United States) Stan Smith defeated (United States) Brian Gottfried / (South Africa) Bob Hewitt 6–3, 6–4
