= Manuel Orantes =

Spanish tennis player (born 1949)

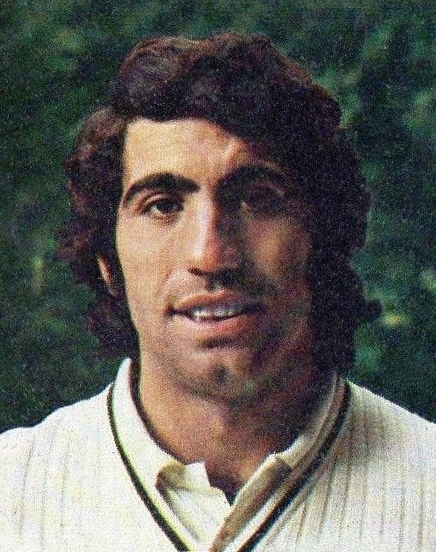
- Country (sports): Spain
- Residence: Barcelona, Spain
- Born: 6 February 1949 (age 77) Granada, Spain
- Height: 1.78 m (5 ft 10 in)
- Turned pro: 1968 (amateur from 1964)
- Retired: 1983
- Plays: Left-handed (one-handed backhand)
- Prize money: $1,398,303
- Int. Tennis HoF: 2012 (member page)

Singles
- Career record: 724–294
- Career titles: 36
- Highest ranking: No. 2 (23 August 1973)

Grand Slam singles results
- Australian Open: QF (1968)
- French Open: F (1974)
- Wimbledon: SF (1972)
- US Open: W (1975)

Other tournaments
- Tour Finals: W (1976)
- Olympic Games: F (1968, demonstration)

Doubles
- Career record: 298–155
- Career titles: 23
- Highest ranking: No.1 1975

Grand Slam doubles results
- Australian Open: SF (1968)
- French Open: F (1978)
- Wimbledon: QF (1972)
- US Open: 3R (1975)

Team competitions
- Davis Cup: F (1967^{Ch}, 1970)
Medal record
Representing Spain
Mediterranean Games
Gold medal – first place	1971 İzmir	Singles
Gold medal – first place	1971 İzmir	Doubles
Silver medal – second place	1967 Tunis	Doubles

Manuel Orantes Corral (Spanish pronunciation: [maˈnwel oˈɾantes koˈral]; born 6 February 1949) is a Spanish former professional tennis player. He won 36 career singles titles, including the 1975 US Open, defeating defending champion Jimmy Connors in the final. Orantes reached a career-high singles ranking of world No. 2.

== Career ==
On 7 September 1975 Orantes defeated top-seeded Jimmy Connors in straight sets in the final of the US Open at Forest Hills, New York, where he "destroyed Connors' usually furious attacking game with popcorn balls" to win his only Grand Slam title. A year earlier, he was runner-up to Björn Borg in the final of the French Open, taking a two-set lead before Borg won the last three sets, losing just two games in total.

Overall, he won 36 singles titles, including Rome (1972), Hamburg (1972 & 1975), Canada (1975), Monte Carlo (1975), the U.S. Claycourt Championships (1973, 1975 & 1977), the U.S. Pro in Boston (1977 & 1978) and the Masters in 1976. He also reached 35 finals, including the French Open (1974), Cincinnati (1973), Monte Carlo (1970), Canada (1973 & 1974), Rome (1973 & 1975), and Hamburg (1976 & 1977).

Orantes was a stalwart member of the Spanish Davis Cup team from 1967 to 1980, earning a record of 60–27 in Davis Cup match play. He also was a member of the Spanish team which won the inaugural World Team Cup in 1978.

He also won 22 doubles titles in his career, including Hamburg in 1975 and Canada in 1974. He reached 20 doubles finals, including the French Open in 1978, Canada in 1976, and Hamburg in 1973.

Orantes was inducted into the International Tennis Hall of Fame in 2012.

== Grand Slam finals ==
=== Singles (1 title, 1 runner-up) ===
Result	Year	Championship	Surface	Opponent	Score
Loss	1974	French Open	Clay	(Sweden) Björn Borg	6–2, 7–6^{(7–1)}, 0–6, 1–6, 1–6
Win	1975	US Open	Clay	(United States) Jimmy Connors	6–4, 6–3, 6–3

=== Doubles (1 runner-up) ===
Result	Year	Championship	Surface	Partner	Opponents	Score
Loss	1978	French Open	Clay	(Spain) José Higueras	(United States) Gene Mayer (United States) Hank Pfister	3–6, 2–6, 2–6

== Other significant finals ==
=== Year-end championship ===
==== Singles: 1 (1 title) ====
Result	Year	Championship	Surface	Opponent	Score
Win	1976	Masters	Carpet (i)	(Poland) Wojciech Fibak	5–7, 6–2, 0–6, 7–6^{(7–1)}, 6–1

=== Doubles (1 runner-up) ===
Result	Year	Championship	Surface	Partner	Opponent	Score
Win	1975	Masters	Carpet (i)	(Spain) Juan Gisbert Sr.	(West Germany) Jürgen Fassbender (West Germany) Hans-Jürgen Pohmann	Round robin

== ATP career finals ==
=== Singles: 74 (36 titles / 38 runner-ups) ===
Result	W/L	Date	Tournament	Surface	Opponent	Score
Loss	0–1	Mar 1968	Kingston, Jamaica	Hard (i)	(Netherlands) Tom Okker	2–6, 4–6
Win	1–1	Sep 1968	Madrid, Spain*	Hard (i)	(Spain) Manuel Santana	6–2, 6–8, 5–7, 6–3, 8–6
Win	2–1	Feb 1969	Macon, U.S	Carpet (i)	(United Kingdom) Mark Cox	10–8, 7–5, 4–6, 9–7
Win	3–1	May 1969	Barcelona, Spain	Clay	(Spain) Manuel Santana	6–4, 7–5, 6–4
Loss	3–2	Aug 1969	Kitzbühel, Austria	Clay	(Spain) Manuel Santana	4–6, 2–6, 3–6
Win	4–2	Sep 1969	Madrid, Spain*	Hard (i)	(Australia) Barry Philips-Moore	8–6, 6–3, 6–1
Loss	4–3	Apr 1970	Monte Carlo, Monaco	Clay	(Socialist Federal Republic of Yugoslavia) Željko Franulović	4–6, 3–6, 3–6
Loss	4–4	Nov 1970	Buenos Aires, Argentina	Clay	(Socialist Federal Republic of Yugoslavia) Željko Franulović	4–6, 2–6, 0–6
Loss	4–5	Mar 1971	Caracas, Venezuela	Clay	(Brazil) Thomaz Koch	6–7, 1–6, 3–6
Loss	4–6	Jul 1971	Kitzbühel, Austria	Clay	(United States) Clark Graebner	Abandoned
Win	5–6	Oct 1971	Barcelona, Spain	Clay	(United States) Bob Lutz	6–4, 6–3, 6–4
Win	6–6	Mar 1972	Caracas, Venezuela	Hard	(Pakistan) Haroon Rahim	6–4, 7–5, 6–4
Loss	6–7	Apr 1972	Johannesburg, South Africa	Hard	(United States) Cliff Richey	4–6, 5–7, 6–3, 4–6
Win	7–7	May 1972	Rome, Italy	Clay	(Czechoslovakia) Jan Kodeš	4–6, 6–1, 7–5, 6–2
Win	8–7	May 1972	Brussels, Belgium	Clay	(Spain) Andrés Gimeno	6–4, 6–1, 2–6, 7–5
Win	9–7	Jun 1972	Hamburg, West Germany	Clay	(Italy) Adriano Panatta	6–3, 9–8, 6–0
Win	10–7	Jul 1972	Båstad, Sweden	Clay	(Romania) Ilie Năstase	6–4, 6–3, 6–1
Loss	10–8	Aug 1972	South Orange, U.S.	Hard	(Romania) Ilie Năstase	4–6, 4–6
Loss	10–9	Oct 1972	Barcelona, Spain	Clay	(Czechoslovakia) Jan Kodeš	3–6, 2–6, 3–6
Win	11–9	Apr 1973	Valencia, Spain	Clay	(Italy) Adriano Panatta	6–4, 6–4, 6–3
Win	12–9	Apr 1973	Nice, France	Clay	(Italy) Adriano Panatta	7–6, 5–7, 4–6, 7–6, 12–10
Loss	12–10	Jun 1973	Rome, Italy	Clay	(Romania) Ilie Năstase	1–6, 1–6, 1–6
Loss	12–11	Jul 1973	Båstad, Sweden	Clay	(United States) Stan Smith	4–6, 2–6, 6–7
Loss	12–12	Jul 1973	Kitzbühel, Austria	Clay	(Mexico) Raúl Ramírez	Abandoned
Win	13–12	Aug 1973	Louisville, U.S.	Clay	(Australia) John Newcombe	3–6, 6–3, 6–4
Loss	13–13	Aug 1973	Cincinnati, U.S.	Clay	(Romania) Ilie Năstase	7–5, 3–6, 4–6
Win	14–13	Aug 1973	Indianapolis, U.S.	Clay	(France) Georges Goven	6–4, 6–1, 6–4
Loss	14–14	Aug 1973	Toronto, Canada	Clay	(Netherlands) Tom Okker	3–6, 2–6, 1–6
Loss	14–15	Oct 1973	Barcelona, Spain	Clay	(Romania) Ilie Năstase	6–2, 1–6, 6–8, 4–6
Loss	14–16	Jun 1974	French Open, Paris	Clay	(Sweden) Björn Borg	6–2, 7–6, 0–6, 1–6, 1–6
Loss	14–17	Jul 1974	Gstaad, Switzerland	Clay	(Argentina) Guillermo Vilas	1–6, 2–6
Loss	14–18	Aug 1974	Toronto, Canada	Clay	(Argentina) Guillermo Vilas	4–6, 2–6, 3–6
Loss	14–19	Oct 1974	Barcelona, Spain	Clay	(Romania) Ilie Năstase	6–8, 7–9, 3–6
Loss	14–20	Nov 1974	Buenos Aires, Argentina	Clay	(Argentina) Guillermo Vilas	3–6, 6–0, 5–7, 2–6
Win	15–20	Mar 1975	Cairo, Egypt	Clay	(France) François Jauffret	6–0, 4–6, 6–1, 6–3
Win	16–20	Mar 1975	Monte Carlo WCT, Monaco	Clay	(South Africa) Bob Hewitt	6–2, 6–4
Loss	16–21	Apr 1975	Valencia, Spain	Clay	(Romania) Ilie Năstase	3–6, 0–6
Loss	16–22	Apr 1975	Madrid-2, Spain	Clay	(Romania) Ilie Năstase	6–7, 1–6, 6–2, 3–6
Win	17–22	May 1975	Bournemouth, UK	Clay	(France) Patrick Proisy	6–3, 4–6, 6–2, 7–5
Win	18–22	May 1975	Hamburg, West Germany	Clay	(Czechoslovakia) Jan Kodeš	3–6, 6–2, 6–2, 4–6, 6–1
Loss	18–23	Jun 1975	Rome, Italy	Clay	(Mexico) Raúl Ramírez	6–7, 5–7, 5–7
Win	19–23	Jul 1975	Båstad, Sweden	Clay	(Spain) José Higueras	6–0, 6–3
Win	20–23	Aug 1975	Indianapolis, U.S.	Clay	(United States) Arthur Ashe	6–2, 6–2
Win	21–23	Aug 1975	Toronto, Canada	Clay	(Romania) Ilie Năstase	7–6, 6–0, 6–1
Win	22–23	Sep 1975	US Open, New York	Clay	(United States) Jimmy Connors	6–4, 6–3, 6–3
Loss	22–24	Nov 1975	Tokyo, Japan	Clay	(Mexico) Raúl Ramírez	4–6, 5–7, 3–6
Loss	22–25	Nov 1975	Calcutta, India	Clay	(India) Vijay Amritraj	5–7, 3–6
Win	23–25	Mar 1976	Valencia, Spain	Clay	(Sweden) Kjell Johansson	6–2, 6–2, 6–2
Win	24–25	May 1976	Munich, West Germany	Clay	(West Germany) Karl Meiler	6–1, 6–4, 6–1
Loss	24–26	May 1976	Bournemouth, UK	Clay	(Poland) Wojciech Fibak	2–6, 9–7, 2–6, 2–6
Loss	24–27	May 1976	Hamburg, West Germany	Clay	(United States) Eddie Dibbs	4–6, 6–4, 1–6, 6–2, 1–6
Loss	24–28	May 1976	Düsseldorf, West Germany	Clay	(Sweden) Björn Borg	2–6, 2–6, 0–6
Loss	22–29	Jul 1976	Pepsi Grand Slam, U.S.	Clay	(Romania) Ilie Năstase	4–6, 3–6
Win	25–29	Jul 1976	Kitzbühel, Austria	Clay	(Czechoslovakia) Jan Kodeš	7–6, 6–2, 7–6
Win	26–29	Oct 1976	Tehran, Iran	Clay	(Mexico) Raúl Ramírez	7–6, 6–0, 2–6, 6–4
Win	27–29	Oct 1976	Madrid, Spain	Clay	(United States) Eddie Dibbs	7–6, 6–2, 6–1
Win	28–29	Oct 1976	Barcelona, Spain	Clay	(United States) Eddie Dibbs	6–1, 2–6, 2–6, 7–5, 6–4
Loss	28–30	Nov 1976	London, UK	Carpet	(Mexico) Raúl Ramírez	3–6, 4–6
Loss	28–31	Nov 1976	Stockholm, Sweden	Hard (i)	(United Kingdom) Mark Cox	6–4, 5–7, 6–7
Win	29–31	Dec 1976	Masters, Houston	Carpet	(Poland) Wojciech Fibak	5–7, 6–2, 0–6, 7–6, 6–1
Loss	29–32	May 1977	Hamburg, West Germany	Clay	(Italy) Paolo Bertolucci	3–6, 6–4, 2–6, 3–6
Loss	29–33	Aug 1977	North Conway, U.S.	Clay	(Australia) John Alexander	6–2, 4–6, 4–6
Win	30–33	Aug 1977	Indianapolis, U.S.	Clay	(United States) Jimmy Connors	6–1, 6–3
Win	31–33	Aug 1977	Boston, U.S.	Clay	(United States) Eddie Dibbs	7–6, 7–5, 6–4
Loss	31–33	Oct 1977	Barcelona, Spain	Clay	(Sweden) Björn Borg	2–6, 5–7, 2–6
Win	32–34	Nov 1977	Tokyo Outdoor, Japan	Clay	(Australia) Kim Warwick	6–2, 6–1
Loss	32–35	Nov 1977	Manila, Philippines	Hard	(West Germany) Karl Meiler	DEF
Win	33–35	Aug 1978	Boston, U.S.	Clay	(United States) Harold Solomon	6–4, 6–3
Win	34–35	May 1979	Munich, West Germany	Clay	(Poland) Wojciech Fibak	6–3, 6–2, 6–4
Loss	34–36	Sep 1979	Madrid, Spain	Clay	(France) Yannick Noah	3–6, 7–6, 3–6, 2–6
Loss	34–37	Mar 1980	Nice, France	Clay	(Sweden) Björn Borg	2–6, 0–6, 1–6
Win	35–37	Sep 1981	Palermo, Italy	Clay	(Chile) Pedro Rebolledo	6–4, 6–0, 6–0
Win	36–37	Apr 1982	Bournemouth, UK	Clay	(Spain) Ángel Giménez	6–2, 6–0
Loss	36–38	Mar 1983	Nice, France	Clay	(Sweden) Henrik Sundström	5–7, 6–4, 3–6

- Madrid 1968 and 1969 not listed by ATP.

=== Doubles: 43 (23 titles / 20 runner-ups) ===
Result	W/L	Year	Tournament	Surface	Partner	Opponents	Score
Win	1–0	1969	Barcelona, Spain	Clay	(Chile) Patricio Rodríguez	(Australia) Terry Addison (Australia) Ray Keldie	8–10, 6–3, 6–1, 5–7, 6–2
Win	2–0	1971	New York City, US	Indoor	(Spain) Juan Gisbert Sr.	(United States) Jimmy Connors (Pakistan) Haroon Rahim	7–6, 6–2
Win	3–0	1971	Salisbury, US	Hard (i)	(Spain) Juan Gisbert Sr.	(United States) Clark Graebner (Brazil) Thomaz Koch	6–3, 4–6, 7–6
Loss	3–1	1972	Kansas City, US	Indoor	(Spain) Andrés Gimeno	(Romania) Ilie Năstase (Romania) Ion Țiriac	7–6, 4–6, 6–7
Win	4–1	1972	Salisbury, US	Hard (i)	(Spain) Andrés Gimeno	(Spain) Juan Gisbert Sr. (Czechoslovakia) Vladimir Zednik	6–4, 6–3
Loss	4–2	1972	Hampton, US	Hard (i)	(Spain) Andrés Gimeno	(Romania) Ilie Năstase (Romania) Ion Țiriac	4–6, 6–7
Loss	4–3	1972	Caracas, Venezuela	Hard	(United States) Jim McManus	(Chile) Patricio Cornejo (Chile) Jaime Fillol	4–6, 6–7
Loss	4–4	1972	Madrid, Spain	Clay	(Spain) Andrés Gimeno	(Romania) Ilie Năstase (United States) Stan Smith	2–6, 2–6
Win	5–4	1972	Brussels, Belgium	Clay	(Spain) Juan Gisbert Sr.	(Chile) Patricio Cornejo (Chile) Jaime Fillol	9–7, 6–3
Win	6–4	1972	Eastbourne, UK	Grass	(Spain) Juan Gisbert Sr.	(Greece) Nicholas Kalogeropoulos (Rhodesia) Andrew Pattison	8–6, 6–2
Win	7–4	1972	Barcelona, Spain	Clay	(Spain) Juan Gisbert Sr.	(South Africa) Frew McMillan (Romania) Ilie Năstase	6–3, 3–6, 6–4
Win	8–4	1973	Barcelona, Spain	Clay	(Spain) Juan Gisbert Sr.	(United States) Mike Estep (Romania) Ion Țiriac	6–4, 7–6
Loss	8–5	1973	Hamburg, West Germany	Clay	(Romania) Ion Țiriac	(West Germany) Jürgen Fassbender (West Germany) Hans-Jürgen Pohmann	6–7, 6–7, 6–7
Loss	8–6	1973	Eastbourne, UK	Grass	(Romania) Ion Țiriac	(Sweden) Ove Nils Bengtson (United States) Jim McManus	4–6, 6–4, 5–7
Win	9–6	1973	Louisville, US	Clay	(Romania) Ion Țiriac	(United States) Clark Graebner (Australia) John Newcombe	0–6, 6–4, 6–3
Loss	9–7	1973	Indianapolis, US	Clay	(Romania) Ion Țiriac	(Australia) Bob Carmichael (South Africa) Frew McMillan	3–6, 4–6
Loss	9–8	1973	Barcelona, Spain	Clay	(Spain) Antonio Muñoz	(Romania) Ilie Năstase (Netherlands) Tom Okker	6–4, 3–6, 2–6
Loss	9–9	1974	Tucson, US	Hard	(United States) Tom Edlefsen	(United States) Charlie Pasarell (United States) Sherwood Stewart	4–6, 4–6
Loss	9–10	1974	Monte Carlo, Monaco	Clay	(Australia) Tony Roche	(Australia) John Alexander (Australia) Phil Dent	6–7, 6–4, 6–7, 3–6
Win	10–10	1974	Munich, West Germany	Clay	(Spain) Antonio Muñoz	(West Germany) Jürgen Fassbender (West Germany) Hans-Jürgen Pohmann	2–6, 6–4, 7–6, 6–2
Win	11–10	1974	Gstaad, Switzerland	Clay	(Spain) José Higueras	(Australia) Roy Emerson (Brazil) Thomaz Koch	7–5, 0–6, 6–1, 9–8
Win	12–10	1974	Toronto, Canada	Hard	(Argentina) Guillermo Vilas	(West Germany) Jürgen Fassbender (West Germany) Hans-Jürgen Pohmann	6–1, 2–6, 6–2
Loss	12–11	1974	Barcelona, Spain	Clay	(Argentina) Guillermo Vilas	(Spain) Juan Gisbert Sr. (Romania) Ilie Năstase	6–3, 0–6, 2–6
Win	13–11	1974	Tehran, Iran	Clay	(Argentina) Guillermo Vilas	(United States) Brian Gottfried (Mexico) Raúl Ramírez	7–6, 2–6, 6–2
Win	14–11	1974	Buenos Aires, Argentina	Clay	(Argentina) Guillermo Vilas	(United States) Clark Graebner (Brazil) Thomaz Koch	6–4, 6–3
Win	15–11	1975	Bournemouth, UK	Clay	(Spain) Juan Gisbert Sr.	(Australia) Syd Ball (Australia) Dick Crealy	8–6, 6–3
Win	16–11	1975	Hamburg, West Germany	Clay	(Spain) Juan Gisbert Sr.	(Poland) Wojciech Fibak (Czechoslovakia) Jan Kodeš	6–3, 7–6
Loss	16–12	1975	Båstad, Sweden	Clay	(Spain) Juan Gisbert Sr.	(Sweden) Björn Borg (Sweden) Ove Nils Bengtson	6–7, 5–7
Win	17–12	1975	Indianapolis, US	Clay	(Spain) Juan Gisbert Sr.	(Poland) Wojciech Fibak (West Germany) Hans-Jürgen Pohmann	7–5, 6–0
Loss	17–13	1975	Madrid, Spain	Clay	(Spain) Juan Gisbert Sr.	(Czechoslovakia) Jan Kodeš (Romania) Ilie Năstase	6–7, 6–4, 7–9
Win	18–13	1975	Tehran, Iran	Clay	(Spain) Juan Gisbert Sr.	(South Africa) Bob Hewitt (South Africa) Frew McMillan	7–5, 6–7, 6–1, 6–4
Loss	18–14	1975	Tokyo, Japan	Clay	(Spain) Juan Gisbert Sr.	(United States) Brian Gottfried (Mexico) Raúl Ramírez	6–7, 4–6
Win	19–14	1975	Calcutta, India	Clay	(Spain) Juan Gisbert Sr.	(India) Anand Amritraj (India) Vijay Amritraj	1–6, 6–4, 6–3
Win	20–14	1975	Masters, Stockholm	Carpet	(Spain) Juan Gisbert Sr.	(West Germany) Jürgen Fassbender (West Germany) Hans-Jürgen Pohmann	Round robin
Win	21–14	1976	Valencia, Spain	Clay	(Spain) Juan Gisbert Sr.	(Italy) Corrado Barazzutti (Italy) Antonio Zugarelli	6–1, 6–4
Win	22–14	1976	Munich, West Germany	Clay	(Spain) Juan Gisbert Sr.	(West Germany) Jürgen Fassbender (West Germany) Hans-Jürgen Pohmann	1–6, 6–3, 6–2, 2–3, ret.
Loss	22–15	1976	Bournemouth, UK	Clay	(Spain) Juan Gisbert Sr.	(Poland) Wojciech Fibak (United States) Fred McNair	6–4, 5–7, 5–7
Loss	22–16	1976	Montreal, Canada	Hard	(Spain) Juan Gisbert Sr.	(South Africa) Bob Hewitt (Mexico) Raúl Ramírez	2–6, 1–6
Loss	22–17	1976	Tehran, Iran	Clay	(Spain) Juan Gisbert Sr.	(Poland) Wojciech Fibak (Mexico) Raúl Ramírez	5–7, 1–6
Loss	22–18	1977	Madrid, Spain	Clay	(Spain) Antonio Muñoz	(South Africa) Bob Hewitt (South Africa) Frew McMillan	7–6, 6–7, 3–6, 1–6
Loss	22–19	1978	French Open, Paris	Clay	(Spain) José Higueras	(United States) Gene Mayer (United States) Hank Pfister	3–6, 2–6, 2–6
Win	23–19	1982	Viña del Mar, Chile	Clay	(Mexico) Raúl Ramírez	(Argentina) Guillermo Aubone (Spain) Ángel Giménez	DEF
Loss	23–20	1982	Buenos Aires, Argentina	Clay	(Spain) Angel Gimenez	(Austria) Hans Kary (Hungary) Zoltán Kuhárszky	5–7, 2–6

== Grand Slam singles performance timeline ==
Key
W	F	SF	QF	#R	RR	Q#	DNQ	A	NH

(W) winner; (F) finalist; (SF) semifinalist; (QF) quarterfinalist; (#R) rounds 4, 3, 2, 1; (RR) round-robin stage; (Q#) qualification round; (DNQ) did not qualify; (A) absent; (NH) not held; (SR) strike rate (events won / competed); (W–L) win–loss record.

Tournament	1968	1969	1970	1971	1972	1973	1974	1975	1976	1977	1978	1979	1980	1981	1982	1983	SR	W–L	Win %
Australian Open	QF	A	A	A	A	A	A	A	A	A	A	A	A	A	A	A	0 / 1	3–1	75%
French Open	1R	3R	4R	1R	SF	2R	F	1R	QF	A	QF	4R	4R	1R	A	2R	0 / 14	31–11	74%
Wimbledon	1R	1R	3R	1R	SF	A	4R	A	A	A	A	2R	A	A	A	A	0 / 7	11–7	61%
US Open	A	2R	A	QF	3R	3R	2R	W	QF	QF	1R	A	A	A	A	A	1 / 9	25–8	76%
Win–loss	3–2	3–3	5–2	4–2	11–3	3–2	10–3	7–1	8–2	4–1	4–2	4–2	3–0	0–1	0–0	1–1	1 / 31	70–27	72%
Year-end ranking	–	–	–	–	–	5	11	5	4	7	12	19	58	45	41	74			
