= U.S. Pro Tennis Championships =

Defunct tennis tournament
- Tour: Pro tours (1927–69); Grand Prix Circuit (1970–89); ATP World Tour (1997–99)
- Founded: 1927
- Abolished: 1999
- Location: United States
- Venue: Multiple
- Surface: Grass, Clay, Wood, Hard

The U.S. Pro Tennis Championships (for a period from 1951 to 1962 billed as the Cleveland International Pro or Cleveland World Pro Tennis Championships) was the oldest professional tennis tournament played until its final year of 1999 and is considered to have been a professional major from 1927–1967 until the advent of Open Era. In 1953, 1955, 1956, and 1960, the Cleveland World Pro had a women's draw, with Pauline Betz winning the first three of these, and defeating the reigning U.S. women's champion Doris Hart in the 1956 final. Althea Gibson defeated Pauline Betz in the 1960 women's final.

== History ==
American's first prominent professional player, Vincent Richards, arranged what became the first U.S. Professionals by negotiating with Doc Kelton to have a tournament played at the Notlek Tennis Club, located at 119th Street and Riverside Drive in Manhattan, New York, on September 23–25, 1927. Richards, tour pro Howard Kinsey and teaching pros from the eastern U.S. comprised the field, with Richards defeating Kinsey in the final in straight sets, a victory which earned him $1,000 first-prize money.

The tournament was held annually at various locations, including the West Side Tennis Club in Forest Hills, New York City; the South Shore Tennis Club in Chicago; in Rye, New York; at the Terrace Club in Brooklyn; the Chicago Town and Tennis Club in Chicago; at the L.A. Tennis Club in Los Angeles; at various clubs around Cleveland, Ohio and Cleveland Arena in Cleveland. In 1951, two U.S. Pro events were held, one at Cleveland won by Frank Kovacs and another at Forest Hills won by Pancho Segura. In 1954, the USPLTA authorized Kramer to hold the U.S. Pro Championships at the L.A. Tennis Club in California, Gonzales winning the event, and the Benrus Cup (emblematic of the U.S. Pro) was awarded to Gonzales. There are two U.S. Pro events listed here for both 1951 (Cleveland and Forest Hills) and for 1954 (Cleveland and L.A. Tennis Club). Gonzales won two U.S. Pro titles in 1954. Its final permanent home was the Longwood Cricket Club in Chestnut Hill, Massachusetts, where it was held from 1964 to 1999. It became part of the Grand Prix Tennis Tour shortly after the advent of open tennis in 1968. From 1970 to 1977, it was a prominent tournament of the Grand Prix Super Series. It then became a tennis event within the ATP Tour with reorganization of the top tier of pro tour tennis.

The tournament was later played on Har-Tru clay courts and was initially an important tune-up event for the US Open. But when this Grand Slam tournament moved to hardcourts in 1978, the U.S. Professionals did not follow suit, electing instead to hold its tournament during the US clay court season in early summer instead of during its hitherto pre-Open Era (late summer) time slot. Remaining a clay event into the 1990s, it was a non-ATP exhibition event from 1990 through 1995. During the last stint of the tournament, from 1997 to 1999, it was again an ATP event and was played on hardcourts.

Pancho Gonzales holds the record for most wins with nine, two of those wins in the multiple year of 1954.

== Past finals ==
=== Singles ===
Year	Champions	Runners-up	Score	Venue	Surface
Professional era
1927	(United States) Vincent Richards	(United States) Howard Kinsey	11–9, 6–4, 6–3	Notlek Tennis Club, Manhattan	Grass
1928	(United States) Vinny Richards	(Czechoslovakia) Karel Koželuh	8–6, 6–3, 0–6, 6–2	West Side Tennis Club	Grass
1929	(Czechoslovakia) Karel Koželuh	(United States) Vinny Richards	6–4, 6–4, 4–6, 4–6, 7–5	West Side Tennis Club	Grass
1930	(United States) Vinny Richards	(Czechoslovakia) Karel Koželuh	2–6, 10–8, 6–3, 6–4	West Side Tennis Club	Grass
1931	(United States) Bill Tilden	(United States) Vinny Richards	7–5, 6–2, 6–1	West Side Tennis Club	Grass
1932	(Czechoslovakia) Karel Koželuh	(Weimar Republic) Hans Nüsslein	6–2, 6–2, 7–5	South Shore Country Club	Clay
1933	(United States) Vinny Richards	(United States) Frank Hunter	6–3, 6–0, 6–2	Westchester Country Club	Grass
1934	(Nazi Germany) Hans Nüsslein	(Czechoslovakia) Karel Koželuh	6–4, 6–2, 1–6, 7–5	South Shore Country Club	Clay
1935	(United States) Bill Tilden	(Czechoslovakia) Karel Koželuh	0–6, 6–1, 6–4, 0–6, 6–4	Terrace Club, Brooklyn	Clay
1936	(United States) Joe Whalen	(United States) Charles Wood	4–6, 4–6, 6–3, 6–2, 6–3	Tudor City Tennis Club, New York	Clay
1937 (Note: This tournament, the first pro event open to amateur players, is considered by some as both the U.S. Pro Tennis Championship and first "U.S. Open" event (then the U.S. Open was again held from 1938 to 1941 at Greenbrier but as a separate event from the U.S. Pro held in Chicago or in L.A).)	(Czechoslovakia) Karel Koželuh	(United States) Bruce Barnes	6–2, 6–3, 4–6, 4–6, 6–1	Greenbrier	Clay
1938	(United Kingdom) Fred Perry	(United States) Bruce Barnes	6–3, 6–2, 6–4	Chicago Arena	Canvas (i)
1939	(United States) Ellsworth Vines	(United Kingdom) Fred Perry	8–6, 6–8, 6–1, 20–18	Beverly Hills Tennis Club	Hard
1940	(United States) Don Budge	(United Kingdom) Fred Perry	6–3, 5–7, 6–4, 6–3	Chicago Town and Tennis Club	Clay
1941	(United Kingdom) Fred Perry	(United States) Dick Skeen	6–4, 6–8, 6–2, 6–3	Chicago Town and Tennis Club	Clay
1942	(United States) Don Budge	(United States) Bobby Riggs	6–2, 6–2, 6–2	West Side Tennis Club	Grass
1943	(United States) Bruce Barnes	(United States) John Nogrady	6–1, 7–9, 7–5, 4–6, 6–3	Fort Knox	Clay
1944	not held				
1945	(United States) Welby Van Horn	(United States) John Nogrady	6–4, 6–2, 6–2	Rips Tennis Courts, Manhattan	Clay
1946	(United States) Bobby Riggs	(United States) Don Budge	6–3, 6–1, 6–1	West Side Tennis Club	Grass
1947	(United States) Bobby Riggs	(United States) Don Budge	3–6, 6–3, 10–8, 4–6, 6–3	West Side Tennis Club	Grass
1948	(United States) Jack Kramer	(United States) Bobby Riggs	14–12, 6–2, 3–6, 6–3	West Side Tennis Club	Grass
1949	(United States) Bobby Riggs	(United States) Don Budge	9–7, 3–6, 6–3, 7–5	West Side Tennis Club	Grass
1950	(Ecuador) Pancho Segura	(United States) Frank Kovacs	6–1, 1–6, 8–6, 4–4 ret.	Skating Club, Cleveland	Clay (i)
1951	(United States) Frank Kovacs	(Ecuador) Pancho Segura	6–2, 3–6, 6–3, 1–6, 9–7	Lakewood, Cleveland	Cement (i)
1951 (Note: These tournaments from 1951–1962, were billed as the Cleveland International Pro or Cleveland World Pro Championship. In 1951, a U.S. Pro was held at Forest Hills authorized by the USPLTA, and an International Pro was held at Cleveland, which was designated as the U.S. Pro by the PTPA (Professional Tennis Players Association). The Cleveland event in 1951 awarded the Benrus Cup, emblematic of the U.S. Pro. There was no USPLTA U.S. Pro event held in 1952 or 1953, but the Cleveland International Pro was held in those years and was regarded as the U.S. Pro by the PTPA. In 1954, the USPLTA authorized Kramer to hold the U.S. Pro at L.A. Tennis Club in Los Angeles (this was the successor tournament to the 1951 U.S. Pro at Forest Hills and Segura was the defending champion). The International Pro and World Pro events at Cleveland from 1951-62 were not authorized by the USPLTA to be the U.S. Pro, and were not billed as the U.S. Pro. The USPLTA were an organisation of teaching professionals but some of the touring professionals did enter the Cleveland World Pro (or U.S. Pro) events in this period. In some interviews in the 1950s, Gonzales and Segura referred to the Cleveland World Pro as "the National" or the "U.S. National Professional Championships". There were many newspaper and magazine articles in the 1950s that also referred to the Cleveland World Pro as the U.S. Pro.) (Note: For 1951, the tournament was played under Round Robin format with Segura 4–0 and Gonzalez 3–1 as final standings.)	(Ecuador) Pancho Segura	(United States) Pancho Gonzales	6–3, 6–4, 6–2^{r}	West Side Tennis Club	Grass
1952	(Ecuador) Pancho Segura	(United States) Pancho Gonzales	3–6, 6–4, 3–6, 6–4, 6–0	Lakewood, Cleveland	Cement (i)
1953	(United States) Pancho Gonzales	(United States) Don Budge	4–6, 6–4, 7–5, 6–2	Lakewood, Cleveland	Cement (i)
1954	(United States) Pancho Gonzales	(Australia) Frank Sedgman	6-3, 9-7, 3-6, 6-2	Cleveland Arena, Cleveland	Hard (i)
1954 (Note: In 1954, the USPLTA authorized Kramer to hold the U.S. Pro Championship at the Los Angeles Tennis Club, Gonzales winning the final over Segura in five sets. The Benrus Cup was awarded to Gonzales. This tournament was the successor event to the 1951 Forest Hills U.S. Pro, and Segura was deemed to be defending champion of this version of the U.S. Pro, but there were U.S. Pro events held at Cleveland in 1951, 1952, 1953, and 1954.)	(United States) Pancho Gonzales	(Ecuador) Pancho Segura	6–4, 4–6, 2–6, 6–2, 6–4	Los Angeles Tennis Club	Cement
1955 (Note: For 1955–56, the matches were played under Van Alen scoring system.)	(United States) Pancho Gonzales	(Ecuador) Pancho Segura	21–16, 19–21, 21–8, 20–22, 21–19^{v}	Cleveland Arena	Hard (i)
1956	(United States) Pancho Gonzales	(Ecuador) Pancho Segura	21–15, 13–21, 21–14, 22–20^{v}	Cleveland Arena	Hard (i)
*1956	(United States) Pauline Betz	(United States) Doris Hart	21-16, 19-21, 21-12	Cleveland Arena (Women's event)	Hard (i)
1957	(United States) Pancho Gonzales	(Ecuador) Pancho Segura	6–3, 3–6, 7–5, 6–1	Cleveland Arena	Hard (i)
1958	(United States) Pancho Gonzales	(Australia) Lew Hoad	3–6, 4–6, 14–12, 6–1, 6–4	Cleveland Arena	Hard (i)
1959	(United States) Pancho Gonzales	(Australia) Lew Hoad	6–4, 6–2, 6–4	Cleveland Arena	Hard (i)
1960	(Peru) Alex Olmedo	(United States) Tony Trabert	7–5, 6–4	Cleveland Arena	Hard (i)
*1960	(United States) Althea Gibson	(United States) Pauline Betz	7-5, 2-6, 6-5	Cleveland Arena (Women's event)	Hard (i)
1961	(United States) Pancho Gonzales	(Australia) Frank Sedgman	6–3, 7–5	Cleveland Arena	Hard (i)
1962	(United States) Butch Buchholz	(Ecuador) Pancho Segura	6–4, 6–3, 6–4	Cleveland Arena	Hard (i)
1963	(Australia) Ken Rosewall	(Australia) Rod Laver	6–4, 6–2, 6–2	West Side Tennis Club	Grass
1964	(Australia) Rod Laver	(United States) Pancho Gonzales	4–6, 6–3, 7–5, 6–4	Longwood Cricket Club	Grass
1965	(Australia) Ken Rosewall	(Australia) Rod Laver	6–4, 6–3, 6–3	Longwood Cricket Club	Grass
1966	(Australia) Rod Laver	(Australia) Ken Rosewall	6–4, 4–6, 6–2, 8–10, 6–3	Longwood Cricket Club	Grass
1967	(Australia) Rod Laver	(Spain) Andrés Gimeno	4–6, 6–4, 6–3, 7–5	Longwood Cricket Club	Grass
Open Era
1968	(Australia) Rod Laver	(Australia) John Newcombe	6–4, 6–4, 9–7	Longwood Cricket Club	Grass
1969	(Australia) Rod Laver	(Australia) John Newcombe	7–5, 6–2, 4–6, 6–1	Longwood Cricket Club	Hard
1970	(Australia) Tony Roche	(Australia) Rod Laver	3–6, 6–4, 1–6, 6–2, 6–2	Longwood Cricket Club	Hard
1971	(Australia) Ken Rosewall	(South Africa) Cliff Drysdale	6–4, 6–3, 6–0	Longwood Cricket Club	Hard
1972	(United States) Bob Lutz	(Netherlands) Tom Okker	6–4, 2–6, 6–4, 6–4	Longwood Cricket Club	Hard
1973	(United States) Jimmy Connors	(United States) Arthur Ashe	6–3, 4–6, 6–4, 3–6, 6–2	Longwood Cricket Club	Hard
1974	(Sweden) Björn Borg	(Netherlands) Tom Okker	7–6, 6–1, 6–1	Longwood Cricket Club	Clay
1975	(Sweden) Björn Borg	(Argentina) Guillermo Vilas	6–3, 6–4, 6–2	Longwood Cricket Club	Clay
1976	(Sweden) Björn Borg	(United States) Harold Solomon	6–7, 6–4, 6–1, 6–2	Longwood Cricket Club	Clay
1977	(Spain) Manuel Orantes	(United States) Eddie Dibbs	7–6, 7–5, 6–4	Longwood Cricket Club	Clay
1978	(Spain) Manuel Orantes	(United States) Harold Solomon	6–4, 6–3	Longwood Cricket Club	Clay
1979	(Spain) José Higueras	(Chile) Hans Gildemeister	6–3, 6–1	Longwood Cricket Club	Clay
1980	(United States) Eddie Dibbs	(Argentina) José Luis Clerc	6–2, 6–1	Longwood Cricket Club	Clay
1981	(Argentina) José Luis Clerc	(Chile) Hans Gildemeister	0–6, 6–2, 6–2	Longwood Cricket Club	Clay
1982	(Argentina) Guillermo Vilas	(United States) Mel Purcell	6–4, 6–0	Longwood Cricket Club	Clay
1983	(Argentina) José Luis Clerc	(United States) Jimmy Arias	6–3, 3–6, 6–0	Longwood Cricket Club	Clay
1984	(United States) Aaron Krickstein	(Argentina) José Luis Clerc	7–6, 3–6, 6–4	Longwood Cricket Club	Clay
1985	(Sweden) Mats Wilander	(Argentina) Martín Jaite	6–2, 6–4	Longwood Cricket Club	Clay
1986	(Ecuador) Andrés Gómez	(Argentina) Martín Jaite	7–5, 6–4	Longwood Cricket Club	Clay
1987	(Sweden) Mats Wilander	(Sweden) Kent Carlsson	7–6, 6–1	Longwood Cricket Club	Clay
1988	(Austria) Thomas Muster	(United States) Lawson Duncan	6–2, 6–2	Longwood Cricket Club	Clay
1989	(Ecuador) Andrés Gómez	(Sweden) Mats Wilander	6–1, 6–4	Longwood Cricket Club	Clay
1990 (Note: From 1990 to 1995, the U.S. Pro was an exhibition event and not part of the ATP tour.)	(Argentina) Martín Jaite	(Czechoslovakia) Libor Němeček	7–5, 6–3	Longwood Cricket Club	Clay
1991	(Ecuador) Andrés Gómez	(Soviet Union) Andrei Cherkasov	7–5, 6–4	Longwood Cricket Club	Clay
1992	(United States) Ivan Lendl	(United States) Richey Reneberg	6–3, 6–3	Longwood Cricket Club	Hard
1993	(United States) Ivan Lendl	(United States) Todd Martin	5–7, 6–3, 7–6	Longwood Cricket Club	Hard
1994	(United States) Ivan Lendl	(United States) MaliVai Washington	7–5, 7–6	Longwood Cricket Club	Hard
1995	not completed due to rain				
1996	not held				
1997	(Netherlands) Sjeng Schalken	(Chile) Marcelo Ríos	7–5, 6–3	Longwood Cricket Club	Hard
1998	(United States) Michael Chang	(Netherlands) Paul Haarhuis	6–3, 6–4	Longwood Cricket Club	Hard
1999	(Russia) Marat Safin	(United Kingdom) Greg Rusedski	6–4, 7–6^{(13–11)}	Longwood Cricket Club	Hard

=== Doubles ===
Year	Champions	Runners-up	Score	Venue	Surface
Professional era
1927	no doubles event			Notlek Tennis Club, Manhattan	Grass
1928	no doubles event			West Side Tennis Club	Grass
1929	(Czechoslovakia) Karel Koželuh (United States) Vincent Richards	(United States) Wallace Johnson (United States) Howard Kinsey	5–7, 6–1, 6–3, 6–1	West Side Tennis Club	Grass
1930	(United States) Howard Kinsey (United States) Vincent Richards	(Czechoslovakia) Karel Koželuh (Germany) Roman Najuch	6–2, 15–13, 7–5	West Side Tennis Club	Grass
1931	(United States) Howard Kinsey (United States) Vincent Richards	(United States) Frank Hunter (United States) Bill Tilden	7–9, 7–5, 3–6, 6–4, 6–3	West Side Tennis Club	Grass
1932	(United States) Bruce Barnes (United States) Bill Tilden	(Republic of Ireland) Albert Burke (Czechoslovakia) Karel Koželuh	6–2, 6–1, 6–3	South Shore Country Club	Clay
1933	(United States) Vincent Richards (United States) Charles Wood	(United States) Frank Hunter (United States) Theodore Rericha	6–4, 6–3, 5–7, 6–3	Westchester Country Club	Grass
1934	(United States) Bruce Barnes (France) Emmett Paré	(France) Paul Heston (United States) Ellsworth Vines	6–1, 6–4, 7–5	South Shore Country Club	Clay
1935	(United States) George Lott (United States) Lester Stoefen	(United States) Morty Bernstein (United States) Alfred Chapin	6–2, 6–3, 6–3	Terrace Club, Brooklyn	Clay
1936	(United States) Harold Blauer (United States) Charles Wood	(United States) William Ellis (United States) William Kenney	6–4, 4–1, 6–2	Tudor City Tennis Club, New York	Clay
1937	(United States) George Lott (United States) Vincent Richards	(United States) Bruce Barnes (Czechoslovakia) Karel Koželuh	1–6, 6–8, 6–3, 7–5, 9–7	Greenbrier	Clay
1938	(United Kingdom) Fred Perry (United States) Vincent Richards	(United States) Bruce Barnes (United States) Berkeley Bell	6–4, 2–6, 7–5, 13–11	Chicago Arena	Canvas (i)
1939	(United States) Bruce Barnes (United States) Keith Gledhill	(United Kingdom) Fred Perry (United States) Ellsworth Vines	6–2, 7–5, 11–9	Beverly Hills Tennis Club	Hard
1940	(United States) Don Budge (United Kingdom) Fred Perry	(United States) Vincent Richards (United States) Bill Tilden	7–5, 6–3, 9–7	Chicago Town and Tennis Club	Clay
1941	(United States) Don Budge (United Kingdom) Fred Perry	(United States) Keith Gledhill (United States) Lester Stoefen	6–4, 6–4, 6–3	Chicago Town and Tennis Club	Clay
1942	(United States) Don Budge (United States) Bobby Riggs	(United States) Bruce Barnes (United States) Frank Kovacs	2–6, 6–3, 6–4, 6–3	West Side Tennis Club	Grass
1943	(United States) Bruce Barnes (United States) Gene Mako	(United States) Berkeley Bell (United States) John Nogrady	6–4, 6–0, 6–0	Fort Knox	Clay
1944	not held				
1945	(United States) Vincent Richards (United States) Bill Tilden	(United States) Dick Skeen (United States) Welby Van Horn	7–5, 6–4, 6–2	Rips Tennis Courts, Manhattan	Clay
1946	(United States) Frank Kovacs (United Kingdom) Fred Perry	(United States) Bobby Riggs (United States) Welby Van Horn	1–6, 6–3, 7–5, 6–4	West Side Tennis Club	Grass
1947	(United States) Don Budge (United States) Bobby Riggs	(United States) Frank Kovacs (United Kingdom) Fred Perry	7–5, 9–7, 4–6, 11–9	West Side Tennis Club	Grass
1948	(United States) Jack Kramer (Ecuador) Pancho Segura	(United States) Don Budge (United States) Bobby Riggs	4–6, 5–7, 6–2, 7–5, 8–6	West Side Tennis Club	Grass
1949	(United States) Don Budge (United States) Frank Kovacs	(United States) Carl Earn (United States) John Faunce	6–2, 6–2, 6–4	West Side Tennis Club	Grass
1950	(United States) Frank Kovacs (United States) Welby Van Horn	(United States) Frank Parker (Ecuador) Pancho Segura	1–6, 6–4, 6–4	Skating Club, Cleveland	Clay (i)
1951	no doubles event			Lakewood, Cleveland	Cement (i)
1951	(United States) Pancho Gonzales (Ecuador) Pancho Segura	(United States) Frank Parker (United States) Bobby Riggs		West Side Tennis Club	Grass
1952	no doubles event			Lakewood, Cleveland	Cement (i)
1953	(United States) Don Budge (United States) Pancho Gonzales	(United States) Carl Earn (United States) Bob Rogers	6–1, 6–4	Lakewood, Cleveland	Cement (i)
1954	(United States) Pancho Gonzales (Ecuador) Pancho Segura	(United States) Don Budge (Australia) Frank Sedgman	11-9, 3-6, 6-3	Cleveland Arena, Cleveland	Hard (i)
1954	(Australia) Frank Sedgman (United States) Jack Kramer	(United States) Pancho Gonzales (Ecuador) Pancho Segura	6–2, 6–2, 6–4	Los Angeles Tennis Club	Cement
1955	(United States) Jack Kramer (Ecuador) Pancho Segura	(United States) Don Budge (United States) Pancho Gonzales	24–22, 21–16, 21–18	Cleveland Arena	Hard (i)
1956	(Australia) Rex Hartwig (United States) Tony Trabert	(United States) Pancho Gonzales (Ecuador) Pancho Segura	18–21, 21–11, 21–14, 13–21, 23–21	Cleveland Arena	Hard (i)
1957	(United States) Pancho Gonzales (Australia) Ken Rosewall	(Australia) Dinny Pails (Ecuador) Pancho Segura	6–1, 6–4	Cleveland Arena	Hard (i)
1958	(United States) Pancho Gonzales (Ecuador) Pancho Segura	(Australia) Lew Hoad (United States) Tony Trabert	W/O	Cleveland Arena	Hard (i)
1959	no doubles event			Cleveland Arena	Hard (i)
1960	(Australia) Ashley Cooper (Peru) Alex Olmedo	(Ecuador) Pancho Segura (United States) Tony Trabert	6–3, 6–4	Cleveland Arena	Hard (i)
1961	(Spain) Andrés Gimeno (Australia) Frank Sedgman	(United States) Pancho Gonzales (United States) Barry MacKay (tennis)	7–5, 7–5	Cleveland Arena	Hard (i)
1962	(United States) Butch Buchholz (United States) Barry MacKay	(United States) Don Budge (Ecuador) Pancho Segura	6–2, 6–3	Cleveland Arena	Hard (i)
1963	(Australia) Rod Laver (Australia) Ken Rosewall	(United States) Butch Buchholz (Peru) Alex Olmedo	10–8, 8–6, 6–4	West Side Tennis Club	Grass
1964	no doubles event			Longwood Cricket Club	Grass
1965	no doubles event			Longwood Cricket Club	Grass
1966	(United States) Butch Buchholz (Australia) Rod Laver	(Australia) Lew Hoad (Australia) Ken Rosewall	6–4, 2–6, 6–4	Longwood Cricket Club	Grass
1967	(United States) Dennis Ralston (Australia) Ken Rosewall	(France) Pierre Barthès (Spain) Andrés Gimeno	16–14, 7–5	Longwood Cricket Club	Grass
Open Era
1968	no doubles event			Longwood Cricket Club	Grass
1969	(United States) Pancho Gonzales (Australia) Rod Laver	(Australia) John Newcombe (Australia) Tony Roche	6–4, 5–7, 6–4	Longwood Cricket Club	Hard
1970	(Australia) Roy Emerson (Australia) Rod Laver	(Egypt) Ismail El Shafei (Denmark) Torben Ulrich	6–1, 7–6	Longwood Cricket Club	Hard
1971	(Australia) Roy Emerson (Australia) Rod Laver	(Netherlands) Tom Okker (United States) Marty Riessen	6–4, 6–4	Longwood Cricket Club	Hard
1972	(Australia) John Newcombe (Australia) Tony Roche	(United States) Arthur Ashe (United States) Bob Lutz	6–3, 1–6, 7–6	Longwood Cricket Club	Hard
1973	(United States) Stan Smith (United States) Erik van Dillen	(Egypt) Ismail El Shafei (United States) Marty Riessen	4–6, 6–4, 7–5	Longwood Cricket Club	Hard
1974	(United States) Bob Lutz (United States) Stan Smith	(Germany) Hans-Jürgen Pohmann (United States) Marty Riessen	3–6, 6–4, 6–3	Longwood Cricket Club	Clay
1975	(United States) Brian Gottfried (Mexico) Raúl Ramírez	(United States) John Andrews (United States) Mike Estep	4–6, 6–3, 7–6	Longwood Cricket Club	Clay
1976	(United States) Ray Ruffels (Australia) Allan Stone	(United States) Mike Cahill (United States) John Whitlinger	3–6, 6–3, 7–6	Longwood Cricket Club	Clay
1977	(United States) Bob Lutz (United States) Stan Smith	(United States) Brian Gottfried (South Africa) Bob Hewitt	6–3, 6–4	Longwood Cricket Club	Clay
1978	(Paraguay) Víctor Pecci (Hungary) Balázs Taróczy	(Switzerland) Heinz Günthardt (United States) Van Winitsky	6–3, 3–6, 6–1	Longwood Cricket Club	Clay
1979	(Australia) Syd Ball (Australia) Kim Warwick	(Switzerland) Heinz Günthardt (Czechoslovakia) Pavel Složil	not played	Longwood Cricket Club	Clay
1980	(United States) Gene Mayer (United States) Sandy Mayer	(Chile) Hans Gildemeister (Ecuador) Andrés Gómez	1–6, 6–4, 6–4	Longwood Cricket Club	Clay
1981	(Mexico) Raúl Ramírez (Czechoslovakia) Pavel Složil	(Chile) Hans Gildemeister (Ecuador) Andrés Gómez	6–4, 7–6	Longwood Cricket Club	Clay
1982	(United States) Craig Wittus (United States) Steve Meister	(South Africa) Freddie Sauer (South Africa) Schalk van der Merwe	6–2, 6–3	Longwood Cricket Club	Clay
1983	(United States) Mark Dickson (Brazil) Cássio Motta	(Chile) Hans Gildemeister (Chile) Belus Prajoux	7–5, 6–3	Longwood Cricket Club	Clay
1984	(United States) Ken Flach (United States) Robert Seguso	(United States) Gary Donnelly (Puerto Rico) Ernie Fernandez	6–4, 6–4	Longwood Cricket Club	Clay
1985	(Belgium) Libor Pimek (Socialist Federal Republic of Yugoslavia) Slobodan Živojinović	(Australia) Peter McNamara (United States) Paul McNamee	2–6, 6–4, 7–6	Longwood Cricket Club	Clay
1986	(Chile) Hans Gildemeister (Ecuador) Andrés Gómez	(United States) Dan Cassidy (United States) Mel Purcell	4–6, 7–5, 6–0	Longwood Cricket Club	Clay
1987	(Chile) Hans Gildemeister (Ecuador) Andrés Gómez	(Sweden) Mats Wilander (Sweden) Joakim Nyström	7–6, 3–6, 6–1	Longwood Cricket Club	Clay
1988	(Mexico) Jorge Lozano (United States) Todd Witsken	(Socialist Federal Republic of Yugoslavia) Bruno Orešar (Peru) Jaime Yzaga	6–2, 7–5	Longwood Cricket Club	Clay
1989	(Ecuador) Andrés Gómez (Argentina) Alberto Mancini	(United States) Todd Nelson (United States) Phil Williamson	7–6, 6–2	Longwood Cricket Club	Clay
1990–96	not held				
1997	(Netherlands) Jacco Eltingh (Netherlands) Paul Haarhuis	(United States) Dave Randall (United States) Jack Waite	6–3, 7–6^{(7–3)}	Longwood Cricket Club	Hard
1998	(Netherlands) Jacco Eltingh (Netherlands) Paul Haarhuis	(South Africa) Chris Haggard (United States) Jack Waite	6–3, 6–2	Longwood Cricket Club	Hard
1999	(Argentina) Guillermo Cañas (Argentina) Martín García	(South Africa) Marius Barnard (United States) T.J. Middleton	5–7, 7–6^{(7–2)}, 6–3	Longwood Cricket Club	Hard

== See also ==
- U.S. Pro Tennis Championships draws, 1927–1945
- U.S. Pro Tennis Championships draws, 1946–1967
- French Pro Championship
- Wembley Championships
- Major professional tennis tournaments before the Open Era

== Bibliography ==
- McCauley, Joe (2000). The History of Professional Tennis. Windsor: The Short Run Book Company Limited.
