= Longwood Cricket Club =

Cricket and tennis club in Massachusetts, United States

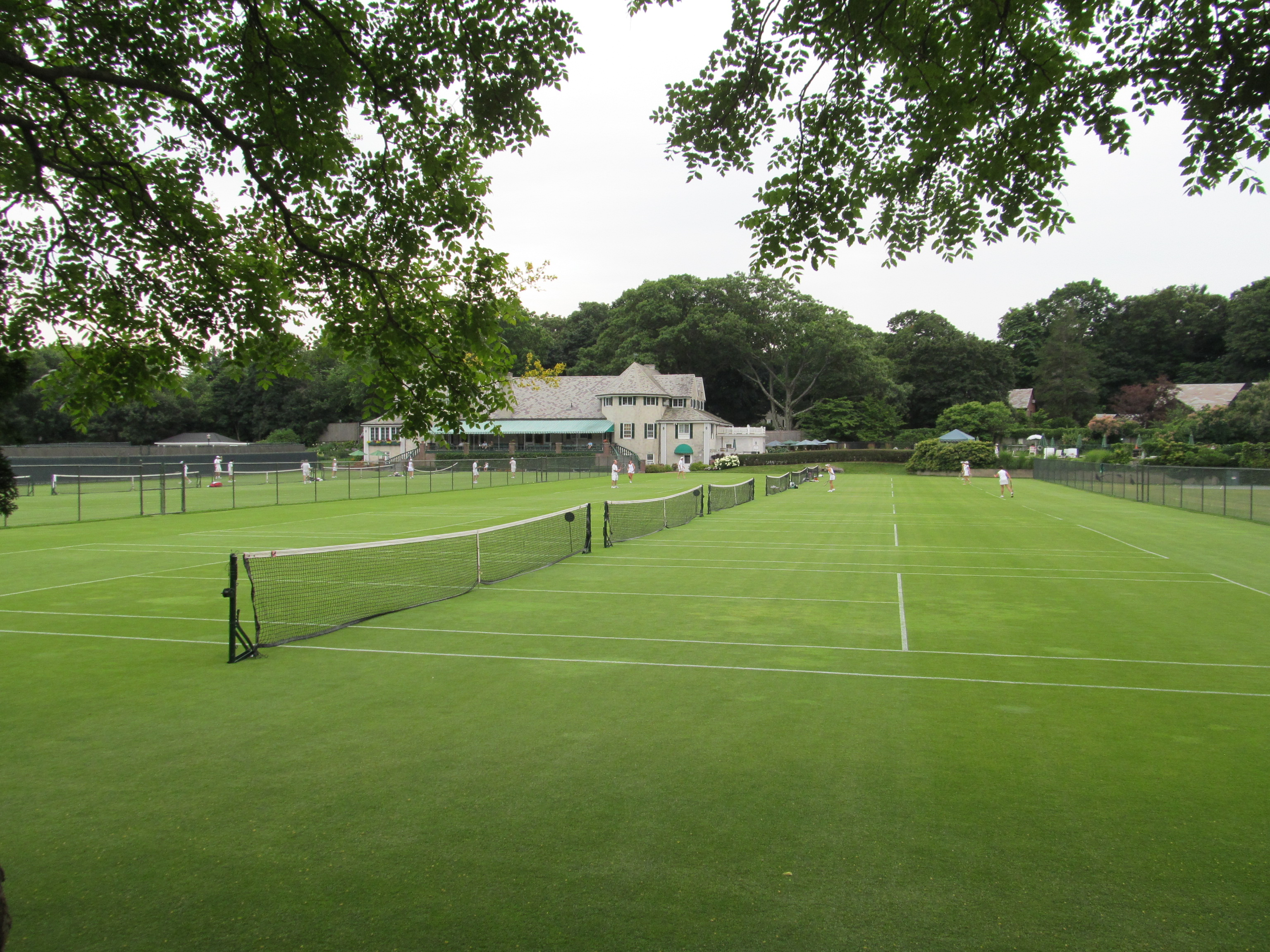
Longwood Cricket Club

Longwood Cricket Club is a tennis club based in Chestnut Hill, Massachusetts. The Club played a seminal role in the introduction and development of lawn tennis in the United States. Its original grounds, in Boston, Massachusetts, were the site of the first Davis Cup competition and the Club was the longtime host of the US Open doubles, 15 Davis Cup ties, and the US Pro tournament. With more than 1,000 members and 44 courts on its 10 acre campus, Longwood is among the largest clubs in the world dedicated exclusively to tennis.

== History ==
A club for cricket was opened in 1877 at Longwood Estate, a place named after the house Napoleon Bonaparte stayed at while exiled to Saint Helena. Located on the outskirts of Boston on land donated by the Sears family, cricketers and baseball players put Longwood on the sports map. Specifically, Harry Wright, first player-manager of the Boston Red Stockings, played cricket for the United States, as did his brother George Wright. George Wright combined with tennis pro Charlie Chambers in league games throughout New England and played at Longwood against Lord Harris' XI in 1891. George Wright was the co-proprietor of Wright and Ditman, purveyor of fine sports goods. Wright brought the first tennis gear to Boston on his return from a baseball-cricket tour of England in 1874. Wright also taught tennis to Harvard students and toured with them in California in 1890. It was George Wright who deserves the credit for Longwood's broad-based sporting tradition, having excelled in baseball and cricket as a paid professional and at tennis as a promoter of the game. A lawn tennis court was laid in 1878, two years after the organization of the All England Lawn Tennis and Croquet Club at Lord's Cricket Ground in London. On January 5, 1888, Longwood member and US cricket team captain C.L. Bixby led the team to a win over the West Indies cricket team at the Bourda ground in Georgetown, Guyana. Richard D. Sears, who won seven United States Championships, would soon become a club member as well.

The club's first tennis tournament was held in 1882. The following year saw the first Longwood Bowl tournament, attracting top American players. It would continue to be held annually until 1942. The Eastern Championship for doubles tennis was held in 1890. Cricket was last played at Longwood in 1933 before a one-off game was held in October 2008 between the Faded Blues CC and St. Columba's Cricket Club from Newport, Rhode Island.

== Notable events ==
=== Davis Cup ===
In 1900 Dwight Davis, then a fourth-year student at nearby Harvard University, arranged for a British team to visit Longwood and compete for what became the first Davis Cup, branded the International Lawn Tennis Challenge. The Davis-captained Americans won the inaugural contest 3–0.

In total, 15 Davis Cup ties have been settled at Longwood. The British Isles defeated the Americans 4–1 in the 1903 final. The 1908 semi-final saw the Americans reverse their fortunes and prevail by the same score. The next eight ties played at Longwood did not involve the American team. 1914 saw Australia defeat Britain 3–0 in a semi-final. 1922 through 1925 saw a tie played a year with Australasia defeating France 4–1 in a quarterfinal encounter in 1922, Australia beating France by the same score in a 1923 semi-final and in 1924, but by a 3–2 scoreline, and Australia defeating Japan 4–1 in 1925. After France swept Japan 5–0 in a 1927 semi-final, the Davis Cup would not return to Longwood for 11 years, with Australia defeating Nazi Germany 5–0 in the 1938 semi-final. A further decade would elapse before in 1948 Australia won another semi, this time over Czechoslovakia, 3–1. In 1957, the U.S. team returned to Brookline to defeat Brazil 5–0 in a 3rd round tie. Two years later saw Australia dispatch with India 4–1 in the penultimate round.

Another 40 years would pass before in 1999, Australia, led by Pat Rafter and Lleyton Hewitt defeated the U.S., led by Pete Sampras, 4–1 in a quarterfinal tie played on hard courts. This was the last time a top-flight professional tennis match was played at Longwood.

=== U.S. Pro Tennis Championships ===
The U.S. Pro Tennis Championships a Major (1927–67) professional tennis tournament was contested annually at Longwood from 1964 to 1999, when it was discontinued, with the exception of 1995, when the tournament was rained out and 1996, when it was not scheduled.

=== Longwood Bowl ===
The Longwood Bowl was a men's and women's tennis tournament first played at the Longwood Cricket Club courts at Brookline, Massachusetts, United States from 1882 to 1949.

=== New England Championships ===
The New England Championships also called the New England Sectional Championships was a men's and women's open tennis tournament staged annually at various locations including Longwood CC from 1886 until 1978.

== Footnotes ==
Preceded by First competition	Davis Cup; 1900	Succeeded by Crescent Athletic Club; Brooklyn
Preceded by Crescent Athletic Club; Brooklyn	Davis Cup; 1903	Succeeded by Worple Road; London
