= 1982 U.S. Pro Tennis Championships – Doubles =

Doubles
- 1982 U.S. Pro Tennis Championships

Final
- Champion: (United States) Craig Wittus (United States) Steve Meister
- Runner-up: (South Africa) Freddie Sauer (South Africa) Schalk van der Merwe
- Score: 6–2, 6–3

Details
- Draw: 32
- Seeds: 8

Events
Singles	Doubles
- U.S. Pro Tennis Championships

The 1982 U.S. Pro Tennis Championships – Doubles was an event of the 1982 U.S. Pro Tennis Championships tennis tournament and was played on outdoor green clay courts at the Longwood Cricket Club in Chestnut Hill, Massachusetts in the United States from July 12 through July 18, 1982. The draw comprised 32 teams of which eight were seeded. Pavel Složil and Raúl Ramírez were the defending U.S. Pro Tennis Championships doubles champions but did not compete together in this edition. The eighth-seeded team of Craig Wittus and Steve Meister won the title by defeating the unseeded team of Freddie Sauer and Schalk van der Merwe in the final, 6–2, 6–3.

== Seeds ==
1. (Mexico) Raúl Ramírez / (United States) Van Winitsky (semifinals)
2. (Uruguay) José Luis Damiani / (Ecuador) Ricardo Ycaza (semifinals)
3. (Australia) John Alexander / (Australia) Syd Ball (second round)
4. (United States) Chris Dunk / (United States) Matt Mitchell (second round)
5. (United States) Mike Bauer / (United States) Derek Tarr (First round)
6. (Australia) David Graham / (United States) Mel Purcell (second round)
7. (South Africa) Danie Visser / (South Africa) Tian Viljoen (quarterfinals)
8. (United States) Steve Meister / (United States) Craig Wittus (champions)

== Draw ==
Key

- Q = Qualifier
- WC = Wild card
- LL = Lucky loser
- Alt = Alternate
- ITF = ITF entry
- PR = Protected ranking
- SR = Special ranking
- SE = Special exempt
- JE = Junior exempt
- JR = Junior Accelerator Programme entrant
- CO = College Accelerator Programme entrant
- NG = Next Gen Accelerator Program entrant
- w/o = Walkover
- r = Retired
- d = Defaulted

=== Finals ===
Semifinals
1	(Mexico) Raúl Ramírez (United States) Van Winitsky	6	3
8	(United States) Steve Meister (United States) Craig Wittus	7	6
(South Africa) Freddie Sauer (South Africa) Schalk van der Merwe	6	5	6
2	(Uruguay) José Luis Damiani (Ecuador) Ricardo Ycaza	3	7	2

Final
8	(United States) Steve Meister (United States) Craig Wittus	6	6
(South Africa) Freddie Sauer (South Africa) Schalk van der Merwe	2	3

=== Top half ===
First Round
1	(Mexico) Raúl Ramírez (United States) Van Winitsky	6	6
(United States) Jonathan Canter (United States) John Ross	2	3
(Argentina) Alejandro Ganzábal (Argentina) Alejandro Gattiker	6	7
(United States) Gonzalo Núñez (Ecuador) Hugo Núñez	0	6
(United States) Bruce Kleege (United States) Bill Maze	6	6
(United States) Mark Dickson (United States) Pender Murphy	3	4
6	(Australia) David Graham (United States) Mel Purcell	1	6	7
(Czechoslovakia) Jiří Granát (Australia) John James	6	4	6
4	(United States) Chris Dunk (United States) Matt Mitchell	6	6	6
(Chile) Hans Gildemeister (Bolivia) Mario Martinez	7	0	3
(Australia) Brad Drewett (United States) Scott McCain	3	7	6
(United States) John Hayes (United States) Cary Leeds	6	6	4
(United States) Mike Cahill (United States) Jay Lapidus	7	6
(United States) David Dowlen (United States) Jeff Turpin	5	3
8	(United States) Steve Meister (United States) Craig Wittus	6	6
(Spain) Ángel Giménez (Spain) Gabriel Urpí	1	3

Second Round
1	(Mexico) Raúl Ramírez (United States) Van Winitsky	6	6
(Argentina) Alejandro Ganzábal (Argentina) Alejandro Gattiker	3	2
(United States) Bruce Kleege (United States) Bill Maze	5	7	7
6	(Australia) David Graham (United States) Mel Purcell	7	5	6
4	(United States) Chris Dunk (United States) Matt Mitchell	5	6
(Australia) Brad Drewett (United States) Scott McCain	7	7
(United States) Mike Cahill (United States) Jay Lapidus	6	6	0
8	(United States) Steve Meister (United States) Craig Wittus	3	7	6

Quarterfinals
1	(Mexico) Raúl Ramírez (United States) Van Winitsky	3	6	6
(United States) Bruce Kleege (United States) Bill Maze	6	2	0
(Australia) Brad Drewett (United States) Scott McCain	4	7	2
8	(United States) Steve Meister (United States) Craig Wittus	6	6	6

Semifinals
1	(Mexico) Raúl Ramírez (United States) Van Winitsky	6	3
8	(United States) Steve Meister (United States) Craig Wittus	7	6

=== Bottom half ===
First Round
(France) Bernard Fritz (France) Gilles Moretton	6	6
5	(United States) Mike Bauer (United States) Derek Tarr	4	4
(United States) Rick Fagel (Uruguay) Diego Pérez	6	4	6
(United States) Bob Berger (United States) Blaine Willenborg	3	6	2
(South Africa) Freddie Sauer (South Africa) Schalk van der Merwe	7	7
(United States) Tom Cain (United States) Eric Fromm	6	6
3	(Australia) John Alexander (Australia) Syd Ball	6	7
(United States) Mark Darby (United States) Todd Lundy	2	5
7	(South Africa) Danie Visser (South Africa) Tian Viljoen	7	6
(United States) Glen Holroyd (United States) Eric Sherbeck	6	4
(United States) Matt Anger (United States) Mike Leach	6	6
(Spain) Juan Avendaño (Austria) Bernhard Pils	2	2
(Romania) Ion Țiriac (Argentina) Guillermo Vilas	6	7
(United States) Marcel Freeman (United States) Rodney Harmon	4	6
2	(Uruguay) José Luis Damiani (Ecuador) Ricardo Ycaza	6	6
(Chile) Ricardo Acuña (United States) Erick Iskersky	4	3

Second Round
(France) Bernard Fritz (France) Gilles Moretton	6	6
(United States) Rick Fagel (Uruguay) Diego Pérez	1	3
(South Africa) Freddie Sauer (South Africa) Schalk van der Merwe	3	6	6
3	(Australia) John Alexander (Australia) Syd Ball	6	3	4
7	(South Africa) Danie Visser (South Africa) Tian Viljoen	7	6
(United States) Matt Anger (United States) Mike Leach	5	3
(Romania) Ion Țiriac (Argentina) Guillermo Vilas	6	6	6
2	(Uruguay) José Luis Damiani (Ecuador) Ricardo Ycaza	7	4	7

Quarterfinals
(France) Bernard Fritz (France) Gilles Moretton	6	4
(South Africa) Freddie Sauer (South Africa) Schalk van der Merwe	7	6
7	(South Africa) Danie Visser (South Africa) Tian Viljoen	4	4
2	(Uruguay) José Luis Damiani (Ecuador) Ricardo Ycaza	6	6

Semifinals
(South Africa) Freddie Sauer (South Africa) Schalk van der Merwe	6	5	6
2	(Uruguay) José Luis Damiani (Ecuador) Ricardo Ycaza	3	7	2
