= 1982 U.S. Pro Tennis Championships – Singles =

Singles
- 1982 U.S. Pro Tennis Championships

Final
- Champion: (Argentina) Guillermo Vilas
- Runner-up: (United States) Mel Purcell
- Score: 6–4, 6–0

Details
- Draw: 64 (7Q)
- Seeds: 16

Events
Singles	Doubles
← 1981 ·	U.S. Pro Tennis Championships	· 1983 →

The 1982 U.S. Pro Tennis Championships – Singles was an event of the 1982 U.S. Pro Tennis Championships tennis tournament and was played on outdoor green clay courts at the Longwood Cricket Club in Chestnut Hill, Massachusetts in the United States from July 12 through July 18, 1982. The draw comprised 64 players and 16 of them were seeded. José Luis Clerc was the defending U.S. Pro Tennis Championships singles champion but did not compete in this edition. First-seeded Guillermo Vilas won the title by defeating seventh-seeded Mel Purcell in the final, 6–4, 6–0.

== Seeds ==
1. (Argentina) Guillermo Vilas (champion)
2. (Czechoslovakia) Ivan Lendl (quarterfinals)
3. (United States) Eliot Teltscher (third round)
4. (France) Yannick Noah (semifinals)
5. (Mexico) Raúl Ramírez (first round)
6. (United States) Eddie Dibbs (second round)
7. (United States) Mel Purcell (final)
8. (Australia) John Alexander (quarterfinals)
9. (United States) Van Winitsky (Third round)
10. (Withdrew)
11. (Uruguay) José Luis Damiani (first round)
12. (Spain) Fernando Luna (semifinals)
13. (Argentina) Alejandro Ganzábal (quarterfinals)
14. (United States) Erick Iskersky (second round)
15. (France) Bernard Fritz (first round)
16. (Spain) Juan Avendaño (first round)

Click on the seed number of a player to go to their draw section.

== Draw ==
=== Key ===
- Q = Qualifier
- WC = Wild card
- LL = Lucky loser
- Alt = Alternate
- SE = Special exempt
- PR = Protected ranking
- ITF = ITF entry
- JE = Junior exempt
- w/o = Walkover
- r = Retired
- d = Defaulted
- SR = Special ranking

=== Finals ===
Quarterfinals
1	(Argentina) Guillermo Vilas	6	7
(United States) Eric Fromm	4	5
4	(France) Yannick Noah	6	7
8	(Australia) John Alexander	1	6
12	(Spain) Fernando Luna	7	4	6
13	(Argentina) Alejandro Ganzábal	6	6	3
7	(United States) Mel Purcell	2	6	6
2	(Czechoslovakia) Ivan Lendl	6	3	2

Semifinals
1	(Argentina) Guillermo Vilas	6	6
4	(France) Yannick Noah	3	2
12	(Spain) Fernando Luna	1	6	3
7	(United States) Mel Purcell	6	4	6

Final
1	(Argentina) Guillermo Vilas	6	6
7	(United States) Mel Purcell	4	0

=== Top half ===
==== Section 1 ====
First Round
1	(Argentina) Guillermo Vilas	3	6	6
(Australia) Brad Drewett	6	2	4
(United States) Craig Wittus	6	6
(Uruguay) Diego Pérez	4	4
Q	(United States) Jeff Turpin	6	6
(United States) Bruce Kleege	1	3
(United States) Tom Cain	6	6
16	(Spain) Juan Avendaño	1	1
11	(Uruguay) José Luis Damiani	2	1
(United States) Eric Fromm	6	6
(United States) Mike Cahill	6	3	6
(South Africa) Danie Visser	3	6	3
(United States) Pender Murphy	6	7	5
(Spain) Ángel Giménez	7	5	7
(United States) Glen Holroyd	7	6
5	(Mexico) Raúl Ramírez	6	4

Second Round
1	(Argentina) Guillermo Vilas	3	6	6
(United States) Craig Wittus	6	1	2
Q	(United States) Jeff Turpin	3	2
(United States) Tom Cain	6	6
(United States) Eric Fromm	6	6
(United States) Mike Cahill	3	0
(Spain) Ángel Giménez	6	6
(United States) Glen Holroyd	3	4

Third Round
1	(Argentina) Guillermo Vilas	7	6
(United States) Tom Cain	5	0
(United States) Eric Fromm	6	6
(Spain) Ángel Giménez	2	3

Quarterfinals
1	(Argentina) Guillermo Vilas	6	7
(United States) Eric Fromm	4	5

==== Section 2 ====
First Round
4	(France) Yannick Noah	6	6
(Australia) John James	3	1
(United States) Jonathan Canter	6	6
(United States) Drew Gitlin	3	1
(United States) Tony Graham	6	1	2
(France) Gilles Moretton	4	6	6
(Bolivia) Mario Martinez	6	6
(South Africa) Tian Viljoen	3	2
14	(United States) Erick Iskersky	6	4	7
(United States) Chris Dunk	3	6	5
(United States) Mark Dickson	6	6
(United States) Mike Bauer	3	0
(United States) Scott McCain	3	4
(United States) Mike Leach	6	6
(South Africa) Freddie Sauer	4	0
8	(Australia) John Alexander	6	6

Second Round
4	(France) Yannick Noah	6	6
(United States) Jonathan Canter	1	4
(France) Gilles Moretton	6	6
(Bolivia) Mario Martinez	2	2
14	(United States) Erick Iskersky	0	6	3
(United States) Mark Dickson	6	4	6
(United States) Mike Leach	3	7	5^{r}
8	(Australia) John Alexander	6	5	5

Third Round
4	(France) Yannick Noah	6	6
(France) Gilles Moretton	2	2
(United States) Mark Dickson	7	4	1
8	(Australia) John Alexander	5	6	6

Quarterfinals
4	(France) Yannick Noah	6	7
8	(Australia) John Alexander	1	6

=== Bottom half ===
==== Section 3 ====
First Round
6	(United States) Eddie Dibbs	6	6
(United States) David Dowlen	4	3
(United States) Jim Delaney	3	7	6
(United States) Marty Davis	6	6	4
(Czechoslovakia) Jiří Granát	1	6
Q	(United States) John Hayes	6	7
Q	(United States) Gonzalo Núñez	4	2
12	(Spain) Fernando Luna	6	6
13	(Argentina) Alejandro Ganzábal	6	6
(United States) John Ross	4	3
Q	(United States) Cary Leeds	4	0
(South Africa) Schalk van der Merwe	6	6
(United States) Jay Lapidus	5	6	3
Q	(United States) Zan Guerry	7	3	6
(United States) Chris Mayotte	6	2
3	(United States) Eliot Teltscher	7	6

Second Round
6	(United States) Eddie Dibbs	5	2
(United States) Jim Delaney	7	6
Q	(United States) John Hayes	1	1
12	(Spain) Fernando Luna	6	6
13	(Argentina) Alejandro Ganzábal	6	6
(South Africa) Schalk van der Merwe	4	4
Q	(United States) Zan Guerry	4	2
3	(United States) Eliot Teltscher	6	6

Third Round
(United States) Jim Delaney	2	0
12	(Spain) Fernando Luna	6	6
13	(Argentina) Alejandro Ganzábal	2	7	6
3	(United States) Eliot Teltscher	6	6	1

Quarterfinals
12	(Spain) Fernando Luna	7	4	6
13	(Argentina) Alejandro Ganzábal	6	6	3

==== Section 4 ====
First Round
7	(United States) Mel Purcell	6	6
(Argentina) Alejandro Gattiker	0	2
Q	(United States) Maurice Hunter	0	1
(United States) Derek Tarr	6	6
(United States) Rick Fagel	4	1
(United States) Harold Solomon	6	6
(United States) Jimmy Brown	6	6
15	(France) Bernard Fritz	4	1
9	(United States) Van Winitsky	4	6	6
(Spain) Gabriel Urpí	6	1	4
(Ecuador) Ricardo Ycaza	1	6	5
(United States) Matt Anger	6	2	7
(Chile) Ricardo Acuña	1	2
(Spain) Juan Aguilera	6	6
Q	(United States) Steve Meister	4	4
2	(Czechoslovakia) Ivan Lendl	6	6

Second Round
7	(United States) Mel Purcell	6	3	6
(United States) Derek Tarr	1	6	3
(United States) Harold Solomon	6	6
(United States) Jimmy Brown	3	0
9	(United States) Van Winitsky	6	6
(United States) Matt Anger	1	2
(Spain) Juan Aguilera	3	4
2	(Czechoslovakia) Ivan Lendl	6	6

Third Round
7	(United States) Mel Purcell	6	6
(United States) Harold Solomon	2	2
9	(United States) Van Winitsky	3	6	2
2	(Czechoslovakia) Ivan Lendl	6	1	6

Quarterfinals
7	(United States) Mel Purcell	2	6	6
2	(Czechoslovakia) Ivan Lendl	6	3	2
