= 1983 Congoleum Classic – Singles =

Singles
- 1983 Congoleum Classic

Final
- Champion: (Spain) José Higueras
- Runner-up: (United States) Eliot Teltscher
- Score: 6–4, 6–2

Details
- Draw: 64
- Seeds: 16

Events
Singles	Doubles
- Congoleum Classic

Yannick Noah was the defending champion but lost in the semifinals to Eliot Teltscher.

José Higueras won the singles title of the 1983 Congoleum Classic tennis tournament in the final 6–4, 6–2 against Teltscher.

== Seeds ==
1. (United States) Jimmy Connors (second round)
2. (France) Yannick Noah (semifinals)
3. (Spain) José Higueras (champion)
4. (United States) Eliot Teltscher (final)
5. (United States) Brian Gottfried (first round)
6. (United States) Sandy Mayer (quarterfinals)
7. (United States) Brian Teacher (first round)
8. (United States) Mel Purcell (first round)
9. (France) Henri Leconte (third round)
10. (Mexico) Raúl Ramirez (third round)
11. (United States) Hank Pfister (second round)
12. (New Zealand) Chris Lewis (third round)
13. (United States) Tom Gullikson (third round)
14. (New Zealand) Russell Simpson (third round)
15. (United States) Victor Amaya (quarterfinals)
16. (United States) Brad Gilbert (quarterfinals)

== Draw ==
Key

- Q = Qualifier
- WC = Wild card
- LL = Lucky loser
- Alt = Alternate
- ITF = ITF entry
- PR = Protected ranking
- SR = Special ranking
- SE = Special exempt
- JE = Junior exempt
- JR = Junior Accelerator Programme entrant
- CO = College Accelerator Programme entrant
- NG = Next Gen Accelerator Program entrant
- w/o = Walkover
- r = Retired
- d = Defaulted

=== Finals ===
Semifinals
(United States) Mike Bauer	6	4	5
3	(Spain) José Higueras	3	6	7
4	(United States) Eliot Teltscher	6	4	6
2	(France) Yannick Noah	4	6	4

Final
3	(Spain) José Higueras	6	6
4	(United States) Eliot Teltscher	4	2

=== Top half ===
==== Section 1 ====
First round
1	(United States) J Connors	6	6
(United States) S Giammalva, Jr.	2	3
(United States) M Bauer	7	7
Q	(United States) B Willenborg	6	5
(United States) M Estep	1	7	7
(Spain) A Tous	6	6	6
(United States) E Adams	0	0
12	(New Zealand) C Lewis	6	6
16	(United States) B Gilbert	6	6
(United States) M S Strode	1	4
(United States) T Waltke	3	3
(United States) M Davis	6	6
(United States) B Walts	5	1
(United States) D Stockton	7	6
(United States) D Gitlin	6	6
8	(United States) M Purcell	2	1

Second round
1	(United States) J Connors	3	4
(United States) M Bauer	6	6
(United States) M Estep	6	2
12	(New Zealand) C Lewis	7	6
16	(United States) B Gilbert	6	6
(United States) M Davis	4	4
(United States) D Stockton	6	3
(United States) D Gitlin	7	6

Third round
(United States) M Bauer	6	6
12	(New Zealand) C Lewis	3	4
16	(United States) B Gilbert	6	6
(United States) D Gitlin	2	0

Quarterfinals
(United States) M Bauer	7	6
16	(United States) B Gilbert	6	3

==== Section 2 ====
First round
3	(Spain) J Higueras	6	2	7
(United States) J Brown	3	6	6
(South Africa) F Sauer	6	4	1
(United States) M Anger	4	6	6
(South Africa) E Edwards	6	6	2
(United States) H Solomon	3	7	6
(United States) M Leach	3	4
13	(United States) T Gullikson	6	6
10	(Mexico) R Ramirez	6	6
(France) T Tulasne	3	1
(United States) S Davis	6	7
(Australia) P Dent	2	5
(United States) M Mitchell	7	6
Q	(United States) R Hightower	5	1
Q	(United States) C Leeds	5	2
6	(United States) S Mayer	7	6

Second round
3	(Spain) J Higueras	6	6
(United States) M Anger	2	1
(United States) H Solomon	6	6	5
13	(United States) T Gullikson	4	7	7
10	(Mexico) R Ramirez	6	2	7
(United States) S Davis	3	6	6
(United States) M Mitchell	6	3	3
6	(United States) S Mayer	4	6	6

Third round
3	(Spain) J Higueras	7	6
13	(United States) T Gullikson	6	4
10	(Mexico) R Ramirez	5	6	3
6	(United States) S Mayer	7	2	6

Quarterfinals
3	(Spain) J Higueras	6	6
6	(United States) S Mayer	0	4

=== Bottom half ===
==== Section 3 ====
First round
7	(United States) B Teacher	4	4
Q	(United States) C Dunk	6	6
(France) B Fritz	6	6
(United States) P Du Pré	2	2
(United States) B Manson	6	4	3
(South Africa) S van der Merwe	2	6	6
Q	(United States) J Manset	2	4
15	(United States) V Amaya	6	6
11	(United States) H Pfister	7	2	6
(United Kingdom) J Lloyd	5	6	1
(United States) E Iskersky	6	3	3
(Sweden) J Gunnarsson	2	6	6
(United States) R Lutz	6	6	6
(United States) N Saviano	7	1	4
(United States) B Foxworth	3	4
4	(United States) E Teltscher	6	6

Second round
Q	(United States) C Dunk	5	3
(France) B Fritz	7	6
(South Africa) S van der Merwe	2	0
15	(United States) V Amaya	6	6
11	(United States) H Pfister	6	2
(Sweden) J Gunnarsson	7	6
(United States) R Lutz	d
4	(United States) E Teltscher

Third round
(France) B Fritz	3	2
15	(United States) V Amaya	6	6
(Sweden) J Gunnarsson	6	0
4	(United States) E Teltscher	7	6

Quarterfinals
15	(United States) V Amaya	1	1
4	(United States) E Teltscher	6	6

==== Section 4 ====
First round
5	(United States) B Gottfried	5	2
(United States) R Van't Hof	7	6
(United States) B Testerman	2	6	6
(France) G Moretton	6	3	1
Q	(Australia) R Case	6	6	7
(South Africa) D Visser	7	4	6
(South Africa) B Mitton	6	4	3
14	(New Zealand) R Simpson	4	6	6
9	(France) H Leconte	6	6
(United States) S Smith	3	4
(United States) P Rennert	6	1
(United States) J Borowiak	7	6
Q	(United States) B Maze	6	0^{r}
(Canada) G Michibata	4	5
(West Germany) D Keretić	1	2
2	(France) Y Noah	6	6

Second round
(United States) R Van't Hof	7	3	7
(United States) B Testerman	6	6	6
Q	(Australia) R Case	4	6
14	(New Zealand) R Simpson	6	7
9	(France) H Leconte	6	3	6
(United States) J Borowiak	4	6	3
(Canada) G Michibata	1	2
2	(France) Y Noah	6	6

Third round
(United States) R Van't Hof	6	6
14	(New Zealand) R Simpson	0	3
9	(France) H Leconte	4	6	2
2	(France) Y Noah	6	4	6

Quarterfinals
(United States) R Van't Hof	2	6	5
2	(France) Y Noah	6	3	7
