= 1983 Congoleum Classic – Doubles =

Doubles
- 1983 Congoleum Classic

Final
- Champions: (United States) Brian Gottfried (Mexico) Raúl Ramirez
- Runners-up: (South Africa) Tian Viljoen (South Africa) Danie Visser
- Score: 6–3, 6–3

Details
- Draw: 32
- Seeds: 8

Events
Singles	Doubles
- Congoleum Classic

Brian Gottfried and Raúl Ramirez were the defending champions and won in the final 6–3, 6–3 against Tian Viljoen and Danie Visser.

== Seeds ==
1. (United States) Sherwood Stewart / (United States) Ferdi Taygan (second round)
2. (United States) Brian Gottfried / (Mexico) Raúl Ramirez (champions)
3. (United States) Victor Amaya / (United States) Hank Pfister (quarterfinals)
4. (United States) Peter Rennert / (United States) Brian Teacher (second round)
5. (United States) Tom Gullikson / (United States) Bruce Manson (second round)
6. (United States) Martin Davis / (United States) Chris Dunk (quarterfinals)
7. (United States) Tracy Delatte / (United States) Mel Purcell (first round)
8. (United States) Charles Buzz Strode / (United States) Morris Skip Strode (first round)

== Draw ==
Key

- Q = Qualifier
- WC = Wild card
- LL = Lucky loser
- Alt = Alternate
- ITF = ITF entry
- PR = Protected ranking
- SR = Special ranking
- SE = Special exempt
- JE = Junior exempt
- JR = Junior Accelerator Programme entrant
- CO = College Accelerator Programme entrant
- NG = Next Gen Accelerator Program entrant
- w/o = Walkover
- r = Retired
- d = Defaulted

=== Final ===
Semifinals
(South Africa) Tian Viljoen (South Africa) Danie Visser	6	6	7
(United States) Mike Bauer (France) Gilles Moretton	7	3	6
(United Kingdom) John Lloyd (United States) Dick Stockton	6	3	5
2	(United States) Brian Gottfried (Mexico) Raúl Ramirez	3	6	7

Final
(South Africa) Tian Viljoen (South Africa) Danie Visser	3	3
2	(United States) Brian Gottfried (Mexico) Raúl Ramirez	6	6

=== Top half ===
First round
1	(United States) S Stewart (United States) F Taygan	6	7
(Sweden) J Gunnarsson (United States) M Mitchell	2	5
(South Africa) T Viljoen (South Africa) D Visser	3	6	7
(United States) S Brawley (United States) M Leach	6	3	6
(United States) E Iskersky (United Kingdom) R Lewis	6	6	6
(South Africa) F Sauer (United States) T Waltke	2	7	2
(United States) E Teltscher (United States) R Van't Hof	6	6	4
5	(United States) T Gullikson (United States) B Manson	4	7	6
4	(United States) P Rennert (United States) B Teacher	6	6
(United States) R Lutz (United States) S Smith	3	4
(United States) M Bauer (France) G Moretton	1	6	6
(United States) R Hightower (United States) S McCain	6	3	2
(United States) M Anger (Australia) A Emerson	6	6
(United States) T Graham (United States) C Leeds	3	3
(United States) P Chamberlin (United States) A Luters	6	5	7
7	(United States) T Delatte (United States) M Purcell	2	7	6

Second round
1	(United States) S Stewart (United States) F Taygan	5	1
(South Africa) T Viljoen (South Africa) D Visser	7	6
(United States) E Iskersky (United Kingdom) R Lewis	7	7
5	(United States) T Gullikson (United States) B Manson	6	6
4	(United States) P Rennert (United States) B Teacher	5	5
(United States) M Bauer (France) G Moretton	7	7
(United States) M Anger (Australia) A Emerson	3	7	5
(United States) P Chamberlin (United States) A Luters	6	5	7

Quarterfinals
(South Africa) T Viljoen (South Africa) D Visser	4	6	7
(United States) E Iskersky (United Kingdom) R Lewis	6	3	6
(United States) M Bauer (France) G Moretton	7	6
(United States) P Chamberlin (United States) A Luters	5	3

Semifinals
(South Africa) T Viljoen (South Africa) D Visser	6	6	7
(United States) M Bauer (France) G Moretton	7	3	6

=== Bottom half ===
First round
8	(United States) C B Strode (United States) M S Strode	4	6	1
(United Kingdom) J Lloyd (United States) D Stockton	6	3	6
(United States) B Kleege (United States) B Testerman	6	7
(United States) E Adams (United States) J Hoffman	2	5
(United States) G Holroyd (United States) E Sherbeck	7	6
(Canada) J Brabenec (United States) A Kohlberg	6	4
(Australia) R Case (South Africa) E Edwards	6	3	4
3	(United States) V Amaya (United States) H Pfister	2	6	6
6	(United States) M Davis (United States) C Dunk	7	6
(United States) D Gitlin (United States) N Saviano	6	3
(United States) T Gorman (United States) C Pasarell	6	4	6
(South Africa) R Moore (South Africa) S van der Merwe	1	6	2
(Spain) J Higueras (Spain) A Tous	6	3	6
(Zimbabwe) A Pattison (United States) B Walts	2	6	4
(South Africa) R Venter (United States) B Willenborg	4	3
2	(United States) B Gottfried (Mexico) R Ramirez	6	6

Second round
(United Kingdom) J Lloyd (United States) D Stockton	6	6
(United States) B Kleege (United States) B Testerman	4	2
(United States) G Holroyd (United States) E Sherbeck	4	5
3	(United States) V Amaya (United States) H Pfister	6	7
6	(United States) M Davis (United States) C Dunk	6	6
(United States) T Gorman (United States) C Pasarell	3	3
(Spain) J Higueras (Spain) A Tous	4	4
2	(United States) B Gottfried (Mexico) R Ramirez	6	6

Quarterfinals
(United Kingdom) J Lloyd (United States) D Stockton	7	6	6
3	(United States) V Amaya (United States) H Pfister	5	7	4
6	(United States) M Davis (United States) C Dunk	4	2
2	(United States) B Gottfried (Mexico) R Ramirez	6	6

Semifinals
(United Kingdom) J Lloyd (United States) D Stockton	6	3	5
2	(United States) B Gottfried (Mexico) R Ramirez	3	6	7
