= 1981 Tel Aviv Open – Doubles =

Doubles
- 1981 Tel Aviv Open

Final
- Champions: (United States) Steve Meister (United States) Van Winitsky
- Runners-up: (United Kingdom) John Feaver (Israel) Steve Krulevitz
- Score: 3–6, 6–3, 6–3

Details
- Draw: 16
- Seeds: 4

Events
Singles	Doubles
- Tel Aviv Open

Per Hjertquist and Steve Krulevitz were the defending champions, but did not participate together this year. Hjertquist partnered Peter Feigl, losing in the semifinals. Krulevitz partnered John Feaver, losing in the final.

Steve Meister and Van Winitsky won the title, defeating Feaver and Krulevitz 3–6, 6–3, 6–3 in the final.

== Seeds ==
1. (Netherlands) Tom Okker / (United States) Dick Stockton (first round)
2. (United Kingdom) John Feaver / (Israel) Steve Krulevitz (final)
3. (Austria) Peter Feigl / (Sweden) Per Hjertquist (semifinals)
4. (United States) Steve Meister / (United States) Van Winitsky (champions)

== Draw ==
Key

- Q = Qualifier
- WC = Wild card
- LL = Lucky loser
- Alt = Alternate
- ITF = ITF entry
- PR = Protected ranking
- SR = Special ranking
- SE = Special exempt
- JE = Junior exempt
- JR = Junior Accelerator Programme entrant
- CO = College Accelerator Programme entrant
- NG = Next Gen Accelerator Program entrant
- w/o = Walkover
- r = Retired
- d = Defaulted

=== Draw ===
First round
1	(Netherlands) T Okker (United States) D Stockton	5	0
(United States) M Purcell (United States) N Van Patten	7	6
(Israel) Ben Roi Zohar (Israel) Rachnimov	3	6	7
(Greece) Arthur Anastopoulo (Israel) Boaz Nikritin	6	3	5
4	(United States) S Meister (United States) V Winitsky	6	6
(Israel) S Glickstein (Israel) D Schneider	2	3
(United States) M Doyle (United States) M Vines	6	6
(West Germany) K Eberhard (Netherlands) L Sanders	0	3
(Israel) S Perkiss (Israel) Eylon Sinai	6	7
(United States) R Webb (Netherlands) E Wilborts	3	5
3	(Austria) P Feigl (Sweden) P Hjertquist	2	6	6
(Austria) B Pils (Austria) R Reininger	6	3	4
(Israel) A Mansdorf (Romania) I Năstase	6	6
(United States) J Gurfein (United States) David Seigel	4	3
(South Africa) F Punčec (West Germany) H Theissen	3	4
2	(United Kingdom) J Feaver (Israel) S Krulevitz	6	6

Quarterfinals
(United States) M Purcell (United States) N Van Patten	6	6
(Israel) BR Zohar (Israel) Rachnimov	3	4
4	(United States) S Meister (United States) V Winitsky	6	5	6
(United States) M Doyle (United States) M Vines	3	7	4
(Israel) S Perkiss (Israel) E Sinai	4	4
3	(Austria) P Feigl (Sweden) P Hjertquist	6	6
(Israel) A Mansdorf (Romania) I Năstase	1	6	1
2	(United Kingdom) J Feaver (Israel) S Krulevitz	6	3	6

Semifinals
(United States) M Purcell (United States) N Van Patten	7	3	5
4	(United States) S Meister (United States) V Winitsky	6	6	7
3	(Austria) P Feigl (Sweden) P Hjertquist	6	3	3
2	(United Kingdom) J Feaver (Israel) S Krulevitz	3	6	6

Final
4	(United States) S Meister (United States) V Winitsky	3	6	6
2	(United Kingdom) J Feaver (Israel) S Krulevitz	6	3	3
