= 1983 Fischer-Grand Prix – Doubles =

Doubles
- 1983 Fischer-Grand Prix

Final
- Champions: (United States) Mel Purcell (United States) Stan Smith
- Runners-up: (Brazil) Marcos Hocevar (Brazil) Cássio Motta
- Score: 6–3, 6–4

Details
- Draw: 16
- Seeds: 4

Events
Singles	Doubles
- Vienna Open

Henri Leconte and Pavel Složil were the defending champions but only Složil competed that year with Tomáš Šmíd.

Složil and Šmíd lost in the first round to Eric Fromm and Eric Korita.

Mel Purcell and Stan Smith won in the final 6–3, 6–4 against Marcos Hocevar and Cássio Motta.

== Seeds ==
1. (Czechoslovakia) Pavel Složil / (Czechoslovakia) Tomáš Šmíd (first round)
2. (Sweden) Anders Järryd / (Sweden) Hans Simonsson (quarterfinals)
3. (India) Anand Amritraj / (United States) Brian Gottfried (first round)
4. (South Africa) Tian Viljoen / (South Africa) Danie Visser (first round)

== Draw ==
Key

- Q = Qualifier
- WC = Wild card
- LL = Lucky loser
- Alt = Alternate
- ITF = ITF entry
- PR = Protected ranking
- SR = Special ranking
- SE = Special exempt
- JE = Junior exempt
- JR = Junior Accelerator Programme entrant
- CO = College Accelerator Programme entrant
- NG = Next Gen Accelerator Program entrant
- w/o = Walkover
- r = Retired
- d = Defaulted

First round
1	(Czechoslovakia) P Složil (Czechoslovakia) T Šmíd	5	2
(United States) E Fromm (United States) E Korita	7	6
(Brazil) M Hocevar (Brazil) C Motta	7	4	6
(South Africa) B Levine (Romania) F Segărceanu	6	6	4
3	(India) A Amritraj (United States) B Gottfried	5	4
(United States) R Crowley (United States) R Evett	7	6
(Switzerland) J Hlasek (United States) E Iskersky	3	6	6
(Sweden) P Hjertquist (United States) N Saviano	6	3	2
(Czechoslovakia) S Birner (United Kingdom) J Smith	7	6
(Argentina) F Yunis (Argentina) J C Yunis	6	2
(Austria) P Feigl (South Africa) B Mitton	6	6	6
4	(South Africa) T Viljoen (South Africa) D Visser	7	3	3
(United States) M Purcell (United States) S Smith	6	5	6
(United States) R Druz (Socialist Federal Republic of Yugoslavia) M Ostoja	3	7	4
(Sweden) S Edberg (Sweden) S Simonsson	4	2
2	(Sweden) A Järryd (Sweden) H Simonsson	6	6

Quarterfinals
(United States) E Fromm (United States) E Korita	6	3	5
(Brazil) M Hocevar (Brazil) C Motta	3	6	7
(United States) R Crowley (United States) R Evett	6	7	4
(Switzerland) J Hlasek (United States) E Iskersky	7	6	6
(Czechoslovakia) S Birner (United Kingdom) J Smith	4	4
(Austria) P Feigl (South Africa) B Mitton	6	6
(United States) M Purcell (United States) S Smith	2	6	6
2	(Sweden) A Järryd (Sweden) H Simonsson	6	3	4

Semifinals
(Brazil) M Hocevar (Brazil) C Motta	2	7	6
(Switzerland) J Hlasek (United States) E Iskersky	6	6	3
(Austria) P Feigl (South Africa) B Mitton	2	7	2
(United States) M Purcell (United States) S Smith	6	6	6

Final
(Brazil) M Hocevar (Brazil) C Motta	3	4
(United States) M Purcell (United States) S Smith	6	6
