= 1981 Tel Aviv Open – Singles =

Singles
- 1981 Tel Aviv Open

Final
- Champion: (United States) Mel Purcell
- Runner-up: (Sweden) Per Hjertquist
- Score: 6–1, 6–1

Details
- Draw: 32
- Seeds: 8

Events
Singles	Doubles
- Tel Aviv Open

Harold Solomon was the defending champion, but did not participate this year.

Mel Purcell won the tournament, beating Per Hjertquist in the final, 6–1, 6–1.

== Seeds ==
1. (United States) Mel Purcell (champion)
2. (Israel) Shlomo Glickstein (quarterfinals)
3. (United States) Vincent Van Patten (quarterfinals)
4. (Romania) Ilie Năstase (second round)
5. (Sweden) Per Hjertquist (final)
6. (Israel) Steve Krulevitz (semifinals)
7. (United States) Matt Doyle (first round)
8. (West Germany) Klaus Eberhard (semifinals)

== Draw ==
Key

- Q = Qualifier
- WC = Wild card
- LL = Lucky loser
- Alt = Alternate
- ITF = ITF entry
- PR = Protected ranking
- SR = Special ranking
- SE = Special exempt
- JE = Junior exempt
- JR = Junior Accelerator Programme entrant
- CO = College Accelerator Programme entrant
- NG = Next Gen Accelerator Program entrant
- w/o = Walkover
- r = Retired
- d = Defaulted

=== Finals ===
Semifinals
1	(United States) Mel Purcell	6	1	6
6	(Israel) Steve Krulevitz	1	6	3
5	(Sweden) Per Hjertquist	5	6	6
8	(West Germany) Klaus Eberhard	7	3	3

Final
1	(United States) Mel Purcell	6	6
5	(Sweden) Per Hjertquist	1	1

=== Top half ===
First round
1	(United States) M Purcell	1	7	6
(United Kingdom) J Feaver	6	5	2
(Austria) B Pils	2	6	6
(United States) G Holroyd	6	4	2
(United States) D Siegler	1	3
(Netherlands) E Wilborts	6	6
(Austria) R Reininger	6	6
7	(United States) M Doyle	4	4
3	(United States) V Van Patten	6	6
(United States) C Mayotte	3	2
(United States) R Webb	2	3
Q	(West Germany) H Theissen	6	6
(United States) V Winitsky	6	7
(France) J-L Haillet	1	5
Q	(Israel) D Schneider	6	5	6
6	(Israel) S Krulevitz	2	7	7

Second round
1	(United States) M Purcell	6	6
(Austria) Bernhard Pils	2	0
(Netherlands) E Wilborts	7	6
(Austria) R Reininger	6	2
3	(United States) V Van Patten	6	6
Q	(West Germany) H Theissen	2	4
(United States) V Winitsky	6	1	4
6	(Israel) S Krulevitz	4	6	6

Quarterfinals
1	(United States) M Purcell	6	6
(Netherlands) E Wilborts	4	3
3	(United States) V Van Patten	5	3
6	(Israel) S Krulevitz	7	6

Semifinals
1	(United States) M Purcell	6	1	6
6	(Israel) S Krulevitz	1	6	3

=== Bottom half ===
First round
5	(Sweden) P Hjertquist	6	6
Q	(South Africa) F Punčec	4	1
(United States) S Meister	6	4	4
(Austria) P Feigl	1	6	6
(United States) D Stockton	6	7
(United States) M Vines	1	6
(Netherlands) T Okker	6	4	6
4	(Romania) I Năstase	4	6	7
8	(West Germany) K Eberhard	6	4	6
(Israel) A Mansdorf	1	6	2
(Greece) Arthur Anastopoulo	6	7
(Egypt) A El Dawoudi	3	5
(Netherlands) L Sanders	7	2	6
(Israel) S Perkiss	6	6	4
(United States) J Gurfein	4	3
2	(Israel) S Glickstein	6	6

Second round
5	(Sweden) P Hjertquist	5	6	6
(Austria) P Feigl	7	4	3
(United States) D Stockton	6	6
4	(Romania) I Năstase	1	4
8	(West Germany) K Eberhard	6	7
(Greece) Arthur Anastopoulo	3	5
(Netherlands) L Sanders	4	7	6
2	(Israel) S Glickstein	6	5	7

Quarterfinals
5	(Sweden) P Hjertquist	2	6	6
(United States) D Stockton	6	4	3
8	(West Germany) K Eberhard	3	6	6
2	(Israel) S Glickstein	6	3	4

Semifinals
5	(Sweden) P Hjertquist	5	6	6
8	(West Germany) K Eberhard	7	3	3
