= 1982 U.S. Pro Tennis Championships =

- Date: July 12–18
- Edition: 55th
- Category: Grand Prix (Super Series)
- Draw: 64S / 32D
- Prize money: $200,000
- Surface: Clay / outdoor
- Location: Chestnut Hill, Massachusetts
- Venue: Longwood Cricket Club

Champions

Singles
- (Argentina) Guillermo Vilas

Doubles
- (United States) Craig Wittus / (United States) Steve Meister
← 1981 ·	U.S. Pro Tennis Championships	· 1983 →

The 1982 U.S. Pro Tennis Championships was a men's tennis tournament played on outdoor green clay courts at the Longwood Cricket Club in Chestnut Hill, Massachusetts in the United States. The event was part of the Super Series of the 1982 Volvo Grand Prix circuit. It was the 55th edition of the tournament and was held from July 12 through July 18, 1982. First-seeded Guillermo Vilas won the singles title.

== Finals ==
=== Singles ===
(Argentina) Guillermo Vilas defeated (United States) Mel Purcell 6–4, 6–0

- It was Vilas' 6th singles title of the year and the 58th of his career.

=== Doubles ===
(United States) Craig Wittus / (United States) Steve Meister defeated (South Africa) Freddie Sauer / (South Africa) Schalk van der Merwe 6–2, 6–3
