= 1980 Tel Aviv Open =

- Date: October 6–12
- Edition: 2nd
- Category: Grand Prix
- Draw: 32S / 16D
- Prize money: $50,000
- Surface: Hard / outdoor
- Location: Ramat HaSharon, Tel Aviv District, Israel
- Venue: Israel Tennis Centers

Champions

Singles
- (United States) Harold Solomon

Doubles
- (Sweden) Per Hjertquist / (United States) Steve Krulevitz
- Tel Aviv Open

The 1980 Tel Aviv Open was a men's tennis tournament played on outdoor hard courts that was part of the 1980 Volvo Grand Prix. It was played at the Israel Tennis Centers in the Tel Aviv District city of Ramat HaSharon, Israel and was held from October 6 to October 12, 1980. It was the second edition of the tournament. First-seeded Harold Solomon won the singles title.

== Finals ==
=== Singles ===
(United States) Harold Solomon defeated (Israel) Shlomo Glickstein 6–2, 6–3

- It was Solomon's 4th singles title of the year and the 22nd and last of his career.

=== Doubles ===
(Sweden) Per Hjertquist / (United States) Steve Krulevitz defeated (United States) Eric Fromm / (United States) Cary Leeds 7–6, 6–3

- It was Hjertquist's 2nd title of the year and the 2nd of his career. It was Krulevitz's 2nd title of the year and the 4th of his career.
