= 1980 Tel Aviv Open – Singles =

Singles
- 1980 Tel Aviv Open

Final
- Champion: (United States) Harold Solomon
- Runner-up: (Israel) Shlomo Glickstein
- Score: 6–2, 6–3

Details
- Draw: 32
- Seeds: 8

Events
| Singles | Doubles |
| ← 1979 · | Tel Aviv Open | · 1981 → |

Tom Okker was the defending champion, but lost in the quarterfinals this year.

Harold Solomon won the tournament, beating Shlomo Glickstein in the final, 6–2, 6–3.

== Seeds ==
1. (United States) Harold Solomon (champion)
2. (Israel) Shlomo Glickstein (final)
3. (Romania) Ilie Năstase (semifinals)
4. (Sweden) Stefan Simonsson (first round)
5. (West Germany) Klaus Eberhard (first round)
6. (Israel) Steve Krulevitz (second round)
7. (Sweden) Per Hjertquist (quarterfinals)
8. (New Zealand) Onny Parun (quarterfinals)

== Draw ==
=== Key ===
- Q = Qualifier
- WC = Wild card
- LL = Lucky loser
- Alt = Alternate
- SE = Special exempt
- PR = Protected ranking
- ITF = ITF entry
- JE = Junior exempt
- w/o = Walkover
- r = Retired
- d = Defaulted
- SR = Special ranking

=== Finals ===
Semifinals
1 | (United States) Harold Solomon | 7 | 6
Q | (United States) Sammy Giammalva Jr. | 5 | 3
3 | (Romania) Ilie Năstase | 4 | 2
2 | (Israel) Shlomo Glickstein | 6 | 6

Final
1 | (United States) Harold Solomon | 6 | 6
2 | (Israel) Shlomo Glickstein | 2 | 3

=== Top half ===
First round
1 | (United States) H Solomon | 6 | 6 | 6
(France) G Moretton | 7 | 3 | 0
(United States) C Mayotte | 7 | 7
(Israel) Chaim Arlozorov | 6 | 6
(Colombia) A Cortes | 6 | 7
(Israel) Shai Puni | 2 | 6
(Australia) D Carter | 7 | 4 | 7
5 | (West Germany) K Eberhard | 5 | 6 | 6
4 | (Sweden) S Simonsson | 1 | 1
(Netherlands) T Okker | 6 | 6
(United States) M Doyle | 6 | 6
Q | (Austria) R Reininger | 2 | 4
Q | (United States) S Giammalva Jr. | 6 | 6
(United Kingdom) R Drysdale | 0 | 4
(Switzerland) M Günthardt | 1 | 4
6 | (Israel) S Krulevitz | 6 | 6

Second round
1 | (United States) H Solomon | 6 | 6
(United States) C Mayotte | 4 | 4
(Colombia) A Cortes | 4 | 6 | 4
(Australia) D Carter | 6 | 2 | 6
(Netherlands) T Okker | 6 | 6
(United States) M Doyle | 3 | 1
Q | (United States) S Giammalva Jr. | 6 | 5 | 7
6 | (Israel) S Krulevitz | 3 | 7 | 6

Quarterfinals
1 | (United States) H Solomon | 6 | 6
(Australia) D Carter | 2 | 3
(Netherlands) T Okker | 6 | 4 | 4
Q | (United States) S Giammalva Jr. | 4 | 6 | 6

Semifinals
1 | (United States) H Solomon | 7 | 6
Q | (United States) S Giammalva Jr. | 5 | 3

=== Bottom half ===
First round
8 | (New Zealand) O Parun | 3 | 7 | 6
(Finland) L Palin | 6 | 6 | 1
(Israel) S Perkiss | 6 | 1 | 6
Q | (Austria) H Stiegler | 4 | 6 | 3
(West Germany) W Zirngibl | 6 | 7
(France) J-L Haillet | 1 | 6
(Bolivia) R Benavides | 1 | 2
3 | (Romania) I Năstase | 6 | 6
7 | (Sweden) P Hjertquist | 7 | 6
(Republic of Ireland) S Sorensen | 6 | 2
(United States) M Grant | 6 | 6
(South Africa) D Schneider | 4 | 2
Q | (United States) E Fromm | 6 | 6 | 6
(South Africa) E Edwards | 7 | 2 | 2
(United Kingdom) R Lewis | 1 | 3
2 | (Israel) S Glickstein | 6 | 6

Second round
8 | (New Zealand) O Parun | 6 | 6
(Israel) S Perkiss | 3 | 3
(West Germany) W Zirngibl | 6 | 5 | 3
3 | (Romania) I Năstase | 4 | 7 | 6
7 | (Sweden) P Hjertquist | 6 | 4 | 6
(United States) M Grant | 2 | 6 | 2
Q | (United States) E Fromm | 5 | 6
2 | (Israel) S Glickstein | 7 | 7

Quarterfinals
8 | (New Zealand) O Parun | 2 | 6 | 5
3 | (Romania) I Năstase | 6 | 3 | 7
7 | (Sweden) P Hjertquist | 1 | 6
2 | (Israel) S Glickstein | 6 | 7

Semifinals
3 | (Romania) I Năstase | 4 | 2
2 | (Israel) S Glickstein | 6 | 6
