= 1980 Tel Aviv Open – Doubles =

Tennis tournament

Doubles
- 1980 Tel Aviv Open

Final
- Champions: (Sweden) Per Hjertquist (Israel) Steve Krulevitz
- Runners-up: (United States) Eric Fromm (United States) Cary Leeds
- Score: 7–6, 6–3

Details
- Draw: 16
- Seeds: 4

Events
Singles	Doubles
- Tel Aviv Open

Ilie Năstase and Tom Okker were the defending champions, but lost in the quarterfinals this year.

Per Hjertquist and Steve Krulevitz won the title, defeating Eric Fromm and Cary Leeds 7–6, 6–3 in the final.

== Seeds ==
1. (Romania) Ilie Năstase / (Netherlands) Tom Okker (quarterfinals)
2. (Switzerland) Heinz Günthardt / (United States) Chris Mayotte (semifinals)
3. (South Africa) Eddie Edwards / (Finland) Leo Palin (quarterfinals)
4. (Sweden) Per Hjertquist / (Israel) Steve Krulevitz (champions)

== Draw ==
Key

- Q = Qualifier
- WC = Wild card
- LL = Lucky loser
- Alt = Alternate
- ITF = ITF entry
- PR = Protected ranking
- SR = Special ranking
- SE = Special exempt
- JE = Junior exempt
- JR = Junior Accelerator Programme entrant
- CO = College Accelerator Programme entrant
- NG = Next Gen Accelerator Program entrant
- w/o = Walkover
- r = Retired
- d = Defaulted

=== Draw ===
First round
1	(Romania) I Năstase (Netherlands) T Okker	7	6
(Israel) S Perkiss (Israel) Eylon Sinai	6	4
(New Zealand) O Parun (West Germany) W Zirngibl	7	7
(United States) M Doyle (Republic of Ireland) S Sorensen	6	6
3	(South Africa) E Edwards (Finland) L Palin	6	7
(Australia) D Carter (Israel) S Glickstein	4	6
(United States) E Fromm (United States) C Leeds	3	6	6
(South Africa) D Schneider (United States) H Solomon	6	2	3
(United States) M Grant (Sweden) S Simonsson	6	6
(Austria) B Pils (Austria) Roland Steigler	1	2
4	(Sweden) P Hjertquist (Israel) S Krulevitz	6	6
(Bolivia) R Benavides (Colombia) A Cortes	2	2
(West Germany) K Eberhard (West Germany) H Kirchhübel	6	7
(France) J-L Haillet (France) G Moretton	2	5
(United Kingdom) R Drysdale (United Kingdom) Chris Lewis	4	3
2	(Switzerland) H Günthardt (United States) C Mayotte	6	6

Quarterfinals
1	(Romania) I Năstase (Netherlands) T Okker	6	2	4
(New Zealand) O Parun (West Germany) W Zirngibl	2	6	6
3	(South Africa) E Edwards (Finland) L Palin	6	2	6
(United States) E Fromm (United States) C Leeds	4	6	7
(United States) M Grant (Sweden) S Simonsson	5	4
4	(Sweden) P Hjertquist (Israel) S Krulevitz	7	6
(West Germany) K Eberhard (West Germany) H Kirchhübel	3	6
2	(Switzerland) H Günthardt (United States) C Mayotte	6	7

Semifinals
(New Zealand) O Parun (West Germany) W Zirngibl	7	3	2
(United States) E Fromm (United States) C Leeds	6	6	6
4	(Sweden) P Hjertquist (Israel) S Krulevitz	3	7	7
2	(Switzerland) H Günthardt (United States) C Mayotte	6	6	5

Final
(United States) E Fromm (United States) C Leeds	6	3
4	(Sweden) P Hjertquist (Israel) S Krulevitz	7	6
