= 1981 Tel Aviv Open =

- Date: October 5–12
- Edition: 3rd
- Category: Grand Prix
- Draw: 32S / 16D
- Prize money: $75,000
- Surface: Hard / outdoor
- Location: Ramat HaSharon, Tel Aviv District, Israel
- Venue: Israel Tennis Centers

Champions

Singles
- (United States) Mel Purcell

Doubles
- (United States) Steve Meister / (United States) Van Winitsky
- Tel Aviv Open

The 1981 Tel Aviv Open was a men's tennis tournament played on outdoor hard courts that was part of the 1981 Volvo Grand Prix. It was played at the Israel Tennis Centers in the Tel Aviv District city of Ramat HaSharon, Israel and was held from October 5 to October 12, 1981. It was the third edition of the tournament. First-seeded Mel Purcell won the singles title.

== Finals ==
=== Singles ===
(United States) Mel Purcell defeated (Sweden) Per Hjertquist 6–1, 6–1

- It was Purcell's 3rd title of the year and the 3rd of his career.

=== Doubles ===
(United States) Steve Meister / (United States) Van Winitsky defeated (United Kingdom) John Feaver / (United States) Steve Krulevitz 3–6, 6–3, 6–3

- It was Meister's only title of the year and the 1st of his career. It was Winitsky's 3rd title of the year and the 6th of his career.
