= 1983 Fischer-Grand Prix – Singles =

Singles
- 1983 Fischer-Grand Prix

Final
- Champion: (United States) Brian Gottfried
- Runner-up: (United States) Mel Purcell
- Score: 6–2, 6–3, 7–5

Details
- Draw: 32
- Seeds: 8

Events
Singles	Doubles
← 1982 ·	Vienna Open	· 1984 →

Brian Gottfried was the defending champion and won in the final 6–2, 6–3, 7–5 against Mel Purcell.

== Seeds ==
1. (United States) Brian Gottfried (champion)
2. (Czechoslovakia) Tomáš Šmíd (first round)
3. (Poland) Wojciech Fibak (first round)
4. (Sweden) Anders Järryd (semifinals)
5. (United States) Mel Purcell (final)
6. (Sweden) Stefan Simonsson (second round)
7. (United States) Mark Dickson (quarterfinals)
8. (United States) Eric Korita (quarterfinals)

== Draw ==
=== Key ===
- Q = Qualifier
- WC = Wild card
- LL = Lucky loser
- Alt = Alternate
- SE = Special exempt
- PR = Protected ranking
- ITF = ITF entry
- JE = Junior exempt
- w/o = Walkover
- r = Retired
- d = Defaulted
- SR = Special ranking

=== Final ===
Semifinals
5	(United States) Brian Gottfried	1	3
(Sweden) Stefan Edberg	3	4
4	(Sweden) Anders Järryd	5	1
5	(United States) Mel Purcell	7	6

Final
1	(United States) Brian Gottfried	6	6	7
5	(United States) Mel Purcell	2	3	5

=== Section 1 ===
First round
1	(United States) B Gottfried	6	6
(Sweden) H Simonsson	4	2
(United States) T Wilkison	6	4	6
(Switzerland) R Stadler	1	6	3
(Netherlands) M Schapers	7	7
(United States) S Smith	5	5
(West Germany) M Westphal	7	4	5
6	(Sweden) S Simonsson	5	6	7
3	(Poland) W Fibak	4	3	r
(Sweden) S Edberg	6	4
(South Africa) D Visser	6	4
(Brazil) M Hocevar	7	6
Q	(South Africa) B Levine	4	6
(Austria) B Pils	6	7
(United States) M Doyle	1	1
8	(United States) E Korita	6	6

Second round
1	(United States) B Gottfried	6	7
(United States) T Wilkison	3	5
(Netherlands) M Schapers	6	6
6	(Sweden) S Simonsson	1	4
(Sweden) S Edberg	6	6
(Brazil) M Hocevar	4	4
Q	(Austria) B Pils	3	5
8	(United States) E Korita	6	7

Quarterfinals
1	(United States) B Gottfried	6	4	6
(Netherlands) M Schapers	2	6	3
(Sweden) S Edberg	6	6
8	(United States) E Korita	4	1

Semifinals
1	(United States) B Gottfried	6	6
(Sweden) S Edberg	3	4

=== Section 2 ===
First round
7	(United States) M Dickson	6	6
(United States) N Saviano	1	0
(Czechoslovakia) P Složil	7	3	2
(South Africa) B Mitton	6	6	6
Q	(Sweden) J Svensson	4	6	6
(United States) E Fromm	6	3	1
(United States) E Iskersky	1	6	1
4	(Sweden) A Järryd	6	3	6
5	(United States) M Purcell	7	6
(Romania) F Segărceanu	6	0
(United States) J Borowiak	3	3
(United States) S Lipton	6	6
(Austria) P Feigl	6	6
(West Germany) J Becka	2	0
Q	(Socialist Federal Republic of Yugoslavia) M Ostoja	2	6	6
2	(Czechoslovakia) T Šmíd	6	4	3

Second round
7	(United States) M Dickson	7	6
(South Africa) B Mitton	6	1
Q	(Sweden) J Svensson	7	5	2
4	(Sweden) A Järryd	6	7	6
5	(United States) M Purcell	6	6
(United States) S Lipton	2	1
(Austria) P Feigl	6	6
Q	(Socialist Federal Republic of Yugoslavia) M Ostoja	4	3

Quarterfinals
7	(United States) M Dickson	6	6	1
4	(Sweden) A Järryd	2	7	6
5	(United States) M Purcell	6	2	6
(Austria) P Feigl	4	6	1

Semifinals
4	(Sweden) A Järryd	5	1
5	(United States) M Purcell	7	6
