= 1982 Congoleum Classic – Doubles =

Doubles
- 1982 Congoleum Classic

Final
- Champions: (United States) Brian Gottfried (Mexico) Raúl Ramirez
- Runners-up: (United Kingdom) John Lloyd (United States) Dick Stockton
- Score: 6–4, 3–6, 6–2

Details
- Draw: 32
- Seeds: 8

Events
Singles	Doubles
- Congoleum Classic

Bruce Manson and Brian Teacher were the defending champions but only Manson competed that year with Rick Leach.

Leach and Manson lost in the first round to Rolf Gehring and Shlomo Glickstein.

Brian Gottfried and Raúl Ramirez won in the final 6–4, 3–6, 6–2 against John Lloyd and Dick Stockton.

== Seeds ==
1. (United States) Fritz Buehning / (United States) Peter Fleming (quarterfinals)
2. (Australia) Mark Edmondson / (Australia) Kim Warwick (first round)
3. (United States) Peter Rennert / (United States) Sherwood Stewart (quarterfinals)
4. (United States) Victor Amaya / (United States) Hank Pfister (quarterfinals)
5. (United States) Brian Gottfried / (Mexico) Raúl Ramirez (champions)
6. (United States) Terry Moor / (United States) Eliot Teltscher (first round)
7. (United States) Tim Gullikson / (United States) Tom Gullikson (first round)
8. (United States) Mike Bauer / (United States) John Benson (first round)

== Draw ==
Key

- Q = Qualifier
- WC = Wild card
- LL = Lucky loser
- Alt = Alternate
- ITF = ITF entry
- PR = Protected ranking
- SR = Special ranking
- SE = Special exempt
- JE = Junior exempt
- JR = Junior Accelerator Programme entrant
- CO = College Accelerator Programme entrant
- NG = Next Gen Accelerator Program entrant
- w/o = Walkover
- r = Retired
- d = Defaulted

=== Final ===
Semifinals
5	(United States) Brian Gottfried (Mexico) Raúl Ramirez	6	6	6
(United States) Scott Davis (United States) Chris Dunk	3	7	2
(United States) Larry Stefanki (United States) Robert Van't Hof	6	6	2
(United Kingdom) John Lloyd (United States) Dick Stockton	4	7	6

Final
5	(United States) Brian Gottfried (Mexico) Raúl Ramirez	6	3	6
(United Kingdom) John Lloyd (United States) Dick Stockton	4	6	2

=== Top half ===
First round
1	(United States) F Buehning (United States) P Fleming	7	6
(Australia) D Graham (United States) M Mitchell	6	3
(France) G Moretton (France) Y Noah	6	7	6
(Brazil) C Kirmayr (Italy) A Panatta	7	6	3
(West Germany) R Gehring (Israel) S Glickstein	6	6
(United States) R Leach (United States) B Manson	3	3
(United States) J Austin (United States) B Nichols	4	1
5	(United States) B Gottfried (Mexico) R Ramirez	6	6
4	(United States) V Amaya (United States) H Pfister	6	6
(United States) P DuPré (United States) B Kleege	2	1
(South Africa) B Mitton (Zimbabwe) A Pattison	6	6
(United States) G Hardie (United States) B Maze	0	2
(United States) S Davis (United States) C Dunk	6	6
(Australia) R Case (Australia) J Fitzgerald	4	4
(United States) M Purcell (Czechoslovakia) T Šmíd	6	6
8	(United States) M Bauer (United States) J Benson	4	4

Second round
1	(United States) F Buehning (United States) P Fleming	6	6
(France) G Moretton (France) Y Noah	4	4
(West Germany) R Gehring (Israel) S Glickstein	0	4
5	(United States) B Gottfried (Mexico) R Ramirez	6	6
4	(United States) V Amaya (United States) H Pfister	6	6
(South Africa) B Mitton (Zimbabwe) A Pattison	2	2
(United States) S Davis (United States) C Dunk	6	6
(United States) M Purcell (Czechoslovakia) T Šmíd	4	4

Quarterfinals
1	(United States) F Buehning (United States) P Fleming	3	3
5	(United States) B Gottfried (Mexico) R Ramirez	6	6
4	(United States) V Amaya (United States) H Pfister	0	6
(United States) S Davis (United States) C Dunk	6	7

Semifinals
5	(United States) B Gottfried (Mexico) R Ramirez	6	6	6
(United States) S Davis (United States) C Dunk	3	7	2

=== Bottom half ===
First round
7	(United States) Tim Gullikson (United States) Tom Gullikson	3	6	3
(United States) L Stefanki (United States) R Van't Hof	6	3	6
(United States) S Giammalva Jr. (United States) T Mayotte	6	6
(Paraguay) F González (South Africa) R Moore	4	3
(Colombia) A Cortes (Chile) J Fillol	2	6	6
(United States) L Bourne (Australia) D Carter	6	3	4
(United States) C B Strode (United States) M S Strode	1	6
3	(United States) P Rennert (United States) S Stewart	6	7
6	(United States) T Moor (United States) E Teltscher	6	4	6
(United States) T Delatte (United States) N Saviano	3	6	7
(United States) R Tanner (United States) E van Dillen	6	6
(United States) C Mayotte (United States) R Meyer	4	2
(United Kingdom) J Lloyd (United States) D Stockton	6	6
(United States) S Krulevitz (United States) F McNair	3	4
(Australia) J Alexander (Australia) P Dent	4	6	6
2	(Australia) M Edmondson (Australia) K Warwick	6	3	4

Second round
(United States) L Stefanki (United States) R Van't Hof	6	6	7
(United States) S Giammalva Jr. (United States) T Mayotte	0	7	6
(Colombia) A Cortes (Chile) J Fillol	6	3	4
3	(United States) P Rennert (United States) S Stewart	2	6	6
(United States) T Delatte (United States) N Saviano	1	7	6
(United States) R Tanner (United States) E van Dillen	6	6	7
(United Kingdom) J Lloyd (United States) D Stockton	6	6
(Australia) J Alexander (Australia) P Dent	4	2

Quarterfinals
(United States) L Stefanki (United States) R Van't Hof	7	2	6
3	(United States) P Rennert (United States) S Stewart	6	6	3
(United States) R Tanner (United States) E van Dillen	4	5
(United Kingdom) J Lloyd (United States) D Stockton	6	7

Semifinals
(United States) L Stefanki (United States) R Van't Hof	6	6	2
(United Kingdom) J Lloyd (United States) D Stockton	4	7	6
