= 1982 Congoleum Classic – Singles =

Singles
- 1982 Congoleum Classic

Final
- Champion: (France) Yannick Noah
- Runner-up: (Czechoslovakia) Ivan Lendl
- Score: 3–6, 6–2, 7–5

Details
- Draw: 64
- Seeds: 16

Events
Singles	Doubles
- Congoleum Classic

Jimmy Connors was the defending champion but did not compete that year.

Yannick Noah won in the final 3–6, 6–2, 7–5 against Ivan Lendl.

== Seeds ==
1. (Czechoslovakia) Ivan Lendl (final)
2. (United States) Eliot Teltscher (semifinals)
3. (United States) Roscoe Tanner (quarterfinals)
4. (France) Yannick Noah (champion)
5. (United States) Brian Gottfried (first round)
6. (Australia) Mark Edmondson (first round)
7. (United States) Harold Solomon (quarterfinals)
8. (United States) Eddie Dibbs (second round)
9. (United States) Hank Pfister (third round)
10. (Czechoslovakia) Tomáš Šmíd (third round)
11. (United States) Mel Purcell (third round)
12. (Israel) Shlomo Glickstein (third round)
13. (United States) Tim Mayotte (second round)
14. (United States) Van Winitsky (first round)
15. (United States) Vince Van Patten (first round)
16. (United States) Bill Scanlon (second round)

== Draw ==
Key

- Q = Qualifier
- WC = Wild card
- LL = Lucky loser
- Alt = Alternate
- ITF = ITF entry
- PR = Protected ranking
- SR = Special ranking
- SE = Special exempt
- JE = Junior exempt
- JR = Junior Accelerator Programme entrant
- CO = College Accelerator Programme entrant
- NG = Next Gen Accelerator Program entrant
- w/o = Walkover
- r = Retired
- d = Defaulted

=== Finals ===
Semifinals
1	(Czechoslovakia) Ivan Lendl	7	6
(Mexico) Raúl Ramirez	6	3
4	(France) Yannick Noah	7	2	6
2	(United States) Eliot Teltscher	6	6	4

Final
1	(Czechoslovakia) Ivan Lendl	6	2	5
4	(France) Yannick Noah	3	6	7

=== Top half ===
==== Section 1 ====
First round
1	(Czechoslovakia) I Lendl	6	6
Q	(United States) S Davis	1	3
(United States) S Giammalva Jr.	0	2
(United States) R Lutz	6	6
(Australia) K Warwick	6	6
(United States) D Stockton	4	3
(Brazil) C Kirmayr	0	2
13	(United States) T Mayotte	6	6
12	(Israel) S Glickstein	2	6	6
(Australia) J Fitzgerald	6	1	4
(South Africa) R Moore	6	6
(United States) P DuPré	2	4
(United States) P Rennert	7	6
(France) G Moretton	5	3
(United States) V Amaya	6	1	6
5	(United States) B Gottfried	4	6	2

Second round
1	(Czechoslovakia) I Lendl	7	6
(United States) R Lutz	5	1
(Australia) K Warwick	6	6
13	(United States) T Mayotte	4	2
12	(Israel) S Glickstein	6	6
(South Africa) R Moore	3	3
(United States) P Rennert	4	3
(United States) V Amaya	6	6

Third round
1	(Czechoslovakia) I Lendl	3	6	7
(Australia) K Warwick	6	3	5
12	(Israel) S Glickstein	6	4
(United States) V Amaya	7	6

Quarterfinals
1	(Czechoslovakia) I Lendl	6	6
(United States) V Amaya	1	1

==== Section 2 ====
First round
3	(United States) R Tanner	7	6
(United States) J Brown	5	3
(Australia) J Alexander	6	3	6
(United States) J Arias	3	6	3
(United States) J Borowiak	7	6
(Italy) A Panatta	6	4
(United States) N Saviano	5	7	2
9	(United States) H Pfister	7	6	6
15	(United States) V Van Patten	6	6	1
(United States) Tom Gullikson	7	2	6
(Mexico) R Ramirez	6	6
(United States) M Anger	4	4
(United Kingdom) J Lloyd	3	6	6
(Australia) D Carter	6	3	0
(United States) S Krulevitz	1	5
8	(United States) E Dibbs	6	7

Second round
3	(United States) R Tanner	4	7	7
(Australia) J Alexander	6	6	5
(United States) J Borowiak	6	3
9	(United States) H Pfister	7	6
(United States) Tom Gullikson	1	2
(Mexico) R Ramirez	6	6
(United Kingdom) J Lloyd	6	6
8	(United States) E Dibbs	3	4

Third round
3	(United States) R Tanner	3	6	6
9	(United States) H Pfister	6	4	1
(Mexico) R Ramirez	6	6
(United Kingdom) J Lloyd	2	3

Quarterfinals
3	(United States) R Tanner	4	7	5
(Mexico) R Ramirez	6	5	7

=== Bottom half ===
==== Section 3 ====
First round
6	(Australia) M Edmondson	2	2
(Australia) P Dent	6	6
(United States) E Iskersky	7	5	1
(France) T Tulasne	5	7	6
(United States) B Manson	6	6
(West Germany) R Gehring	0	4
(India) R Krishnan	3	1
11	(United States) M Purcell	6	6
14	(United States) V Winitsky	2	7	3
(United Kingdom) B Mottram	6	6	6
(Chile) J Fillol	3	6	6
Q	(United States) L Stefanki	6	2	1
Q	(South Africa) B Mitton	7	6
(United States) E van Dillen	6	1
Q	(Zimbabwe) A Pattison	5	3
4	(France) Y Noah	7	6

Second round
(Australia) P Dent	6	6
(France) T Tulasne	2	4
(United States) B Manson	1	0
11	(United States) M Purcell	6	6
(United Kingdom) B Mottram	6	6
(Chile) J Fillol	4	1
Q	(South Africa) B Mitton	2	5
4	(France) Y Noah	6	7

Third round
(Australia) P Dent	7	6
11	(United States) M Purcell	6	3
(United Kingdom) B Mottram	3	0
4	(France) Y Noah	6	6

Quarterfinals
(Australia) P Dent	3	4
4	(France) Y Noah	6	6

==== Section 4 ====
First round
7	(United States) H Solomon	6	6
Q	(United States) R Van't Hof	1	3
(Paraguay) F González	6	3	1
(United States) B Gilbert	4	6	6
(United States) Tim Gullikson	7	6
(United States) F Buehning	6	4
(United States) J Austin	3	2
16	(United States) B Scanlon	6	6
10	(Czechoslovakia) T Šmíd	7	7
(United States) P Fleming	6	5
(West Germany) P Elter	6	4
(France) P Portes	7	1^{r}
(Spain) J Higueras	6	6
(United States) T Moor	2	2
Q	(United States) B Nichols	1	0
2	(United States) E Teltscher	6	6

Second round
7	(United States) H Solomon	7	6
(United States) B Gilbert	6	1
(United States) Tim Gullikson	6	6	6
16	(United States) B Scanlon	7	1	4
10	(Czechoslovakia) T Šmíd	6	6
(West Germany) P Elter	4	2
(Spain) J Higueras	4	0
2	(United States) E Teltscher	6	6

Third round
7	(United States) H Solomon	6	6
(United States) Tim Gullikson	1	0
10	(Czechoslovakia) T Šmíd	2	3
2	(United States) E Teltscher	6	6

Quarterfinals
7	(United States) H Solomon	0	4
2	(United States) E Teltscher	6	6
