= 1983 Congoleum Classic =

- Date: February 21–28
- Edition: 10th
- Category: Grand Prix (Super Series)
- Draw: 64S / 32D
- Prize money: $200,000
- Location: La Quinta, California, U.S.
- Venue: La Quinta Resort and Club

Champions

Singles
- (Spain) José Higueras

Doubles
- (United States) Brian Gottfried / (Mexico) Raúl Ramírez
← 1982 ·	Indian Wells Masters	· 1984 →

The 1983 Congoleum Classic was a men's tennis tournament played on outdoor hard courts. It was the 10th edition of the Indian Wells Masters and was part of the 1983 Volvo Grand Prix. It was played at the La Quinta Resort and Club in La Quinta, California in the United States from February 21 through February 28, 1983. Third-seeded José Higueras won the singles title.

== Finals ==
=== Singles ===
(Spain) José Higueras defeated (United States) Eliot Teltscher 6–4, 6–2

- It was Higueras' 1st title of the year and the 15th of his career.

=== Doubles ===
(United States) Brian Gottfried / (Mexico) Raúl Ramírez defeated (South Africa) Tian Viljoen / (South Africa) Danie Visser 6–3, 6–3

- It was Gottfried's 1st title of the year and the 76th of his career. It was Ramirez's 1st title of the year and the 78th of his career.
