= 1983 Fischer-Grand Prix =

- Date: 17–23 October
- Edition: 9th
- Category: Grand Prix
- Draw: 32S / 16D
- Prize money: $100,000
- Surface: Hard / indoor
- Location: Vienna, Austria
- Venue: Wiener Stadthalle

Champions

Singles
- (United States) Brian Gottfried

Doubles
- (United States) Mel Purcell / (United States) Stan Smith
- Vienna Open

The 1983 Fischer-Grand Prix was a men's tennis tournament played on indoor hard courts at the Wiener Stadthalle in Vienna, Austria that was part of the 1983 Volvo Grand Prix. It was the ninth edition if the tournament and was held from 17 October until 23 October 1983. First-seeded Brian Gottfried won the singles title, his fourth at the event after 1977, 1980 and 1982.

== Finals ==
=== Singles ===
(United States) Brian Gottfried defeated (United States) Mel Purcell 6–2, 6–3, 7–5

- It was Gottfried's only singles title of the year and the 25th and last of his career.

=== Doubles ===
(United States) Mel Purcell / (United States) Stan Smith defeated (Brazil) Marcos Hocevar / (Brazil) Cássio Motta 6–3, 6–4

- It was Purcell's only title of the year and the 6th of his career. It was Smith's 2nd title of the year and the 89th of his career.
