= Bob Berger =

American tennis player

- Country (sports): United States
- Born: March 12, 1960 (age 66) Hollywood, Florida, U.S.

Singles
- Highest ranking: No. 594 (Jan 4, 1981)

Doubles
- Career record: 0–1
- Highest ranking: No. 577 (Jan 3, 1983)

Bob Berger (born March 12, 1960) is an American former professional tennis player.

Born in Hollywood, Florida, Berger was the Orange Bowl (16 and under) champion in 1975 and played collegiate tennis for the UCLA Bruins between 1979 and 1983. He also featured on the professional tour and won an ATP Challenger doubles title in Sanremo in 1981, then in 1982 made the doubles main draw of the 1982 U.S. Pro Tennis Championships in Boston, both times partnering Blaine Willenborg.

== ATP Challenger finals ==
=== Doubles: 1 (1–0) ===
Result	No.	Date	Tournament	Surface	Partner	Opponents	Score
Win	1.	Jul 1981	Sanremo, Italy	Clay	(United States) Blaine Willenborg	(Italy) Luca Bottazzi (Italy) Francesco Cancellotti	7–6, 6–3
