= Orange Bowl (tennis) =

Tournament information
- Founded: 1947
- Location: Key Biscayne (1999–2010), Plantation (2011–2024), Fort Lauderdale, Florida (2025–current); United States
- Venue: Frank Veltri Tennis Center, Jimmy Evert Tennis Center (2025–current)
- Category: ITF Junior Grade A (1978–current)
- Surface: Green clay - outdoors
- Draw: 64S / 64Q / 32D
- Website: ustaorangebowl.com

Current champions (2025)
- Singles: (Netherlands) Thijs Boogaard - Boys 18s (China) Sun Xinran - Girls 18s (United States) Matias Reyniak - Boys 16s (United States) Priscilla Sirichantho - Girls 16s
- Doubles: (Puerto Rico) Yannik Álvarez (Slovenia) Žiga Šeško - Boys 18s (Serbia) Anastasija Cvetković (India) Maaya R. Revathi - Girls 18s

The Orange Bowl International Tennis Championships, known as the Dunlop Orange Bowl International Tennis Championships from 2008 to 2013 with Dunlop as the title sponsor, and renamed the Metropolia Orange Bowl International Tennis Championships from 2013 onwards, is a prestigious junior tennis tournament, one of five that are rated by the ITF as 'Grade A'. Established in 1947 in Miami Beach, the tournament has for years featured both boys and girls singles and doubles draws at both '18 and under' (under-19) and '16 and under' (under-17) age categories. From 1999 to 2010, the tournament had been held each December at Crandon Park in Key Biscayne, Florida. Since 2011, it has been held at the Frank Veltri Tennis Center in Plantation, Florida.

== History ==
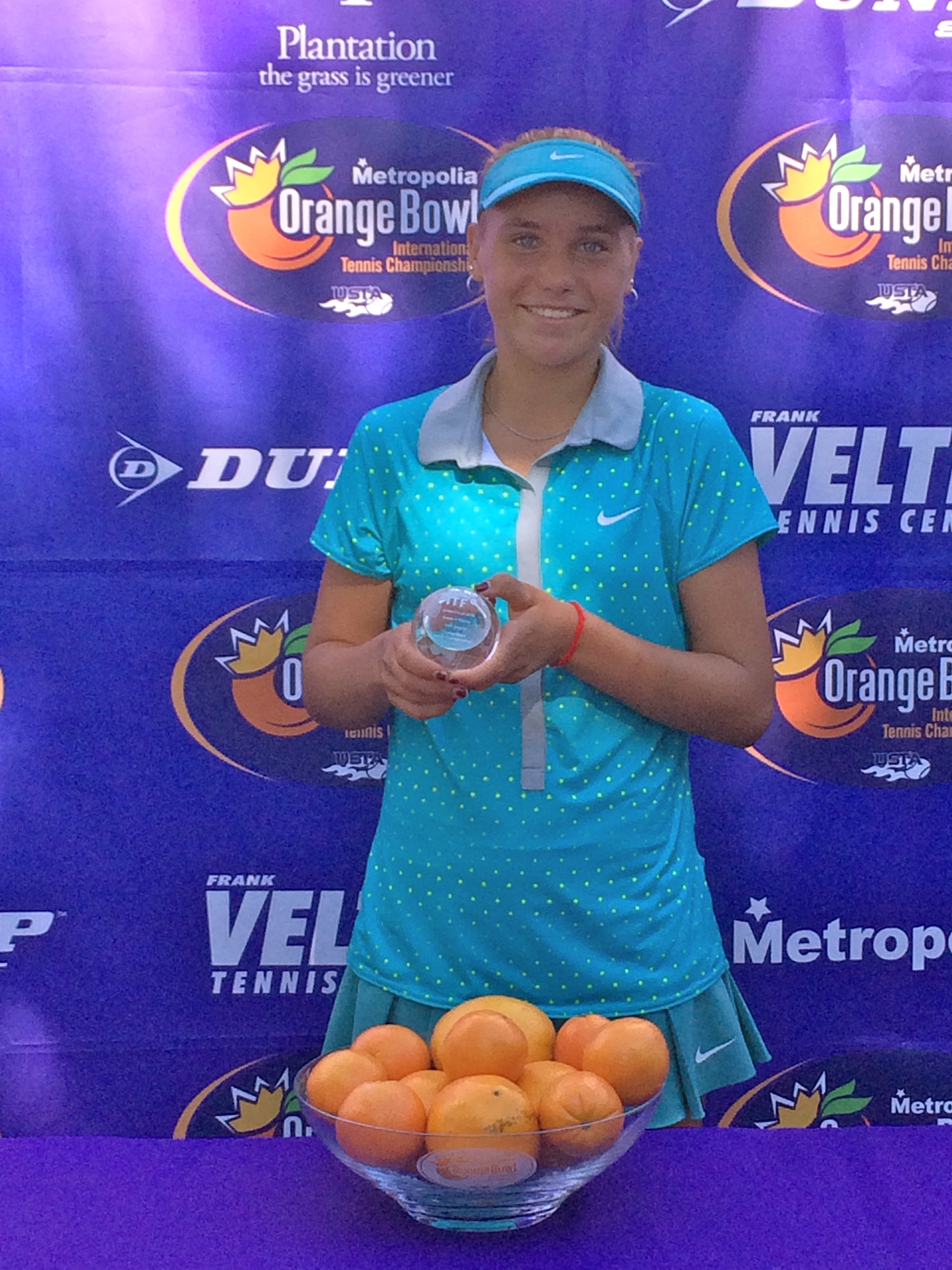
Sofia Kenin won title at the 2014 Dunlop Orange Bowl

The Orange Bowl Tennis Championship began at Flamingo Tennis Center, Miami Beach. This facility, still in use today, hosted the tournament until 1998, when it was moved to Crandon Park in Key Biscayne, Florida. The Orange Bowl was started by Eddie Herr, who wanted to bring some winter competition to South Beach for his tennis playing daughter, Suzanne. The tournament soon grew in prestige and importance, being considered the initiation rite of future world tennis champions. Decades of tournament winners are posted on a brass plaque at the entrance to Flamingo Tennis Center.

Players who have competed at the Orange Bowl reads as a virtual who's who of modern tennis, including Andre Agassi, Arthur Ashe, Boris Becker, Björn Borg, Jimmy Connors, Jim Courier, Stefan Edberg, Chris Evert, Roger Federer, Steffi Graf, Justine Henin, Ivan Lendl, Hana Mandlíková, Andy Roddick, Gabriela Sabatini, Monica Seles, Guillermo Vilas, and Mats Wilander. As of 2017, Miami's Mary Joe Fernandez is the only player, male or female, to win in every age division of the Orange Bowl and Junior Orange Bowl tournaments: 12s, 14s, 16s, and 18s. However, Miami's Lynn Epstein, won the 12s, 14s and skipped the 16s to play up winning the 18s two years in a row. Epstein is the only player, to this day, to have achieved this feat.

In 1983, during the tournament's heyday, a professional stadium was built in Flamingo Park. The Abel Holtz stadium seated 9,000 fans. During the 1990s however, Flamingo Park Tennis Center fell victim to poor maintenance. The standards of the Orange Bowl could not be maintained so in 1999 the tournament was moved to the Tennis Center at Crandon Park in Key Biscayne, home of today's professional tour event, the Miami Open (tennis). Since 2011, the City of Plantation has restored the Orange Bowl Tournament's allure and luster, hosting the best administered and best managed tournament in decades. .

Recently, there has been a tennis revival in Miami Beach. A $5.5M master plan to renovate the Flamingo tennis facility has begun. The project includes a new 5,000 sq ft (460 m^{2}) tennis building and 17 clay hydro-courts. A large bronze plaque containing the names of all the great tennis champions who began their career playing in the tournament in Flamingo park will be restored, along with a plaque honoring local players who went on to tennis fame, such as Jerry Moss.

Since 1962, the two younger age groups ('12 and under' and '14 and under') are held at a separate site in Coral Gables. Hence today, the Junior Orange Bowl is in Coral Gables. And the Orange Bowl (under 16 and under 18) has moved in 2011 from Miami to Plantation, FL thus changing surfaces from Hard Courts to Clay, the first time since 1998 that the tournament will be on clay.

Dunlop has been the tournament's title sponsor since 2008. From 2013 onwards, Metropolia International Holdings became the title sponsor of the tournament.

== Tournament features ==
Players must be at least 13 years old to compete, unless competing in the 12 and unders.

== Past champions ==
=== Singles champions ===
Year	Boys, 18 and under	Girls, 18 and under	Boys, 16 and under until 1962, 15 and under	Girls, 16 and under until 1962, 15 and under
1947	(United States) Lew McMasters	(United States) Joan Johnson	(United States) Dick Holroyd	(United States) Joan Woodberry
1948	(United States) Tommy Boys	(Mexico) Melita Ramírez	(United States) Bobby Sierra	(United States) Toby Greenberg
1949	(United States) Gil Bogley	(United States) Elaine Lewicki	(Cuba) Reynaldo Garrido	(United States) Suzanne Herr
1950	(United States) Jacque R. Grigry	(United States) Toby Greenberg	(United States) Al Harum	(United States) Meta Schroedel
1951	(United States) Sam Giammalva	(United States) Karol Fageros	(United States) Jerry Moss	(United States) Leigh Hay
1952	(United States) Eddie Rubinoff	(United States) Karol Fageros	(Mexico) Esteban Reyes Jr.	(Mexico) Rose Marie Reyes
1953	(United States) Mike Green	(United States) Pat Shaffer	(United States) Jimmy Skogstad	(United States) Pat White
1954	(United States) Allen Quay	(United States) Marilyn Stock	(United States) Earl Buchholz Jr.	(United States) Sandra Lewis
1955	(United States) Mike Green	(United States) Mimi Arnold	(United States) Earl Buchholz Jr.	(United States) Gwyneth Thomas
1956	(Brazil) Carlos Fernandes	(United States) Mary Ann Mitchell	(United States) Ray Senkowski	(United States) Gail DeLozier
1957	(United States) Chris Crawford	(Brazil) Maria Esther Bueno	(United States) Mike Neely	(United States) Frances Farrar
1958	(Brazil) Ronnie Barnes	(United States) Carol Hanks	(United States) Clark Graebner	(United States) Carol-Ann Prosen
1959	(Spain) José Luis Arilla	(United States) Sandy Warshaw	(Puerto Rico) Charlie Pasarell	(United States) Julie Heldman
1960	(United States) William Lenoir	(United States) Carol-Ann Prosen	(Canada) Mike Belkin	(United States) Stephanie DeFina
1961	(Canada) Mike Belkin	(United States) Judy Alvarez	(India) Shyam Minotra	(United States) Stephanie DeFina
1962	(Australia) Tony Roche	(United States) Stephanie DeFina	(United States) Bill Harris	(United States) Peaches Bartkowicz
1963	(Brazil) Thomaz Koch	(United States) Peaches Bartkowicz	(United States) Charles Brainard	(United States) Vicki Holmes
1964	(Mexico) Marcello Lara	(United States) Peaches Bartkowicz	(United States) Zan Guerry	(United States) Carol Hunter
1965	(Egypt) Ismail El Shafei	(United States) Peaches Bartkowicz	(United States) Mac Claflin	(United States) Carol Hunter
1966	(Spain) Manuel Orantes	(United States) Peaches Bartkowicz	(United States) Charles Owens	(United States) Linda Tuero
1967	(United States) Mike Estep	(United States) Patti Hogan	(United States) Woody Blocher	(Japan) Kazuko Sawamatsu
1968	(United States) Richard Stockton	(Mexico) Patricia Montaño	(Argentina) Guillermo Vilas	(United States) Chris Evert
1969	(United States) Harold Solomon	(United States) Chris Evert	(United States) John Whitlinger	(United States) Laurie Fleming
1970	(United States) Harold Solomon	(United States) Chris Evert	(United States) Billy Martin	(United States) Sandy Stap
1971	(Italy) Corrado Barazzutti	(United States) Donna Ganz	(Sweden) Björn Borg	(United States) Jeanne Evert
1972	(Sweden) Björn Borg	(United States) Donna Ganz	(Chile) Hans Gildemeister	(United States) Robin Tenney
1973	(United States) Billy Martin	(Socialist Federal Republic of Yugoslavia) Mima Jaušovec	(France) Christophe Casa	(United States) Zenda Liess
1974	(United States) Billy Martin	(United States) Lynn Epstein	(United States) Van Winitsky	(United States) Zenda Liess
1975	(Spain) Fernando Luna	(United States) Lynn Epstein	(United States) Bobby Berger	(United States) Jennifer Balent
1976	(United States) John McEnroe	(Union of South Africa) Marise Kruger	(Czechoslovakia) Ivan Lendl	(United States) Mary Lou Piatek
1977	(Czechoslovakia) Ivan Lendl	(United States) Anne Smith	(United States) Scott Davis	(Czechoslovakia) Hana Mandlíková
1978	(Spain) Gabriel Urpí	(United States) Andrea Jaeger	(France) Thierry Tulasne	(United States) Michelle DePalmer
1979	(Ecuador) Raúl Viver	(United States) Kathleen Horvath	(Sweden) Mats Wilander	(United States) Pamela Casale
1980	(Sweden) Joakim Nyström	(United States) Susan Mascarin	(United States) Michael Kures	(United States) Barbara Bramblett
1981	(Argentina) Roberto Argüello	(United States) Penny Barg	(Brazil) Carlos Chabalgoity	(Italy) Raffaella Reggi
1982	(France) Guy Forget	(Canada) Carling Bassett	(Sweden) Stefan Edberg	(Mexico) Claudia Hernández
1983	(Sweden) Kent Carlsson	(United States) Debbie Spence	(Socialist Federal Republic of Yugoslavia) Bruno Orešar	(United States) Shawn Foltz
1984	(United States) Ricky Brown	(Argentina) Gabriela Sabatini	(Austria) Horst Skoff	(United States) Mary Joe Fernandez
1985	(Italy) Claudio Pistolesi	(United States) Mary Joe Fernandez	(France) Arnaud Boetsch	(France) Sybille Niox-Château
1986	(Spain) Javier Sánchez	(Argentina) Patricia Tarabini	(United States) Jim Courier	(France) Alexia Dechaume
1987	(United States) Jim Courier	(Soviet Union) Natalia Zvereva	(Netherlands) Paul Dogger	(Argentina) Florencia Labat
1988	(Switzerland) Marc Rosset	(United States) Carrie Cunningham	(France) Fabrice Santoro	(France) Sylvie Sabas
1989	(Brazil) Fernando Meligeni	(United States) Luanne Spadea	(Argentina) Juan Garat	(Soviet Union) Svetlana Komleva
1990	(Soviet Union) Andrei Medvedev	(Spain) Pilar Pérez	(Spain) Àlex Corretja	(Netherlands) Petra Kamstra
1991	(Argentina) Marcelo Charpentier	(Soviet Union) Elena Likhovtseva	(Spain) Gonzalo Corrales	(Germany) Andrea Glass
1992	(United States) Vincent Spadea	(Slovenia) Barbara Mulej	(Germany) Rene Nicklisch	(Italy) Emanuela Sangiorgi
1993	(Spain) Albert Costa	(Spain) Ángeles Montolio	(Argentina) Mariano Zabaleta	(United States) Stephanie Halsell
1994	(Ecuador) Nicolás Lapentti	(Spain) Mariam Ramón	(Austria) Markus Hipfl	(France) Nathalie Dechy
1995	(Argentina) Mariano Zabaleta	(Russia) Anna Kournikova	(Italy) Dario Sciortino	(Spain) Ana Alcázar
1996	(Spain) Alberto Martín	(Spain) Ana Alcázar	(France) Julien Jeanpierre	(Russia) Elena Dementieva
1997	(Chile) Nicolás Massú	(Slovenia) Tina Pisnik	(Argentina) Guillermo Coria	(Spain) Lourdes Domínguez Lino
1998	(Switzerland) Roger Federer	(Russia) Elena Dementieva	(Spain) Tommy Robredo	(Spain) Marta Marrero
1999	(United States) Andy Roddick	(Spain) María José Martínez Sánchez	(Ecuador) Giovanni Lapentti	(Romania) Raluca Ciochină
2000	(Bulgaria) Todor Enev	(Russia) Vera Zvonareva	(Argentina) Brian Dabul	(France) Marion Bartoli
2001	(Sweden) Robin Söderling	(Russia) Vera Zvonareva	(Romania) Florin Mergea	(United States) Whitney Deason
2002	(United States) Brian Baker	(Russia) Vera Dushevina	(Aruba) José Luis Muguruza	(France) Charlène Vanneste
2003	(Cyprus) Marcos Baghdatis	(Czech Republic) Nicole Vaidišová	(United States) Donald Young	(United States) Alexa Glatch
2004	(United States) Timothy Neilly	(United States) Jessica Kirkland	(Argentina) Emiliano Massa	(Argentina) Florencia Molinero
2005	(Switzerland) Robin Roshardt	(Denmark) Caroline Wozniacki	(Spain) Georgi Rumenov Payakov	(Georgia (country)) Oksana Kalashnikova
2006	(Romania) Petru-Alexandru Luncanu	(Austria) Nikola Hofmanova	(Bulgaria) Grigor Dimitrov	(United States) Allie Will
2007	(Lithuania) Ričardas Berankis	(Portugal) Michelle Larcher de Brito	(Australia) Bernard Tomic	(United States) Lilly Kimbell
2008	(India) Yuki Bhambri	(United States) Julia Boserup	(United States) Denis Kudla	(United States) Chanelle Van Nguyen
2009	(France) Gianni Mina	(Canada) Gabriela Dabrowski	(United States) Alexios Halebian	(United States) Breaunna Addison
2010	(United Kingdom) George Morgan	(United States) Lauren Davis	(France) Laurent Lokoli	(United States) Alexandra Kiick
2011	(Austria) Dominic Thiem	(Estonia) Anett Kontaveit	(South Korea) Chung Hyeon	(Canada) Erin Routliffe
2012	(Serbia) Laslo Djere	(Croatia) Ana Konjuh	(Russia) Andrey Rublev	(Canada) Gloria Liang
2013	(United States) Frances Tiafoe	(Russia) Varvara Flink	(South Korea) Chung Yun-seong	(Canada) Charlotte Robillard-Millette
2014	(United States) Stefan Kozlov	(United States) Sofia Kenin	(United States) Sam Riffice	(Canada) Bianca Andreescu
2015	(Serbia) Miomir Kecmanović	(Canada) Bianca Andreescu	(Argentina) Sebastián Báez	(Argentina) María Lourdes Carlé
2016	(Serbia) Miomir Kecmanović	(Slovenia) Kaja Juvan	(United States) Steven Sun	(United States) Katie Volynets
2017	(France) Hugo Gaston	(United States) Whitney Osuigwe	(Romania) Nicholas David Ionel	(Estonia) Katriin Saar
2018	(Finland) Otto Virtanen	(United States) Coco Gauff	(Spain) Pablo Llamas Ruiz	(United States) Madison Sieg
2019	(Argentina) Thiago Agustín Tirante	(United States) Robin Montgomery	(Spain) Daniel Rincón	(United States) Ashlyn Krueger
2020	(France) Arthur Fils	(United States) Ashlyn Krueger	(United States) Jonah Braswell	(United States) Valeria Ray
2021	(Paraguay) Adolfo Daniel Vallejo	(Croatia) Petra Marčinko	(United States) Quang Duong	(United States) Kate Kim
2022	(South Korea) Gerard Campaña Lee	(Japan) Mayu Crossley	(Japan) Naoya Honda	(United States) Alexis Nguyen
2023	Danil Panarin	(United Kingdom) Hannah Klugman	(United States) Dominick Mosejczuk	(United States) Leena Friedman
2024	(Spain) Andrés Santamarta Roig	(Czech Republic) Tereza Krejčová	(United States) Jordan Lee	(China) Xiaotong Wang
2025	(Netherlands) Thijs Boogaard	(China) Sun Xinran	(United States) Matias Reyniak	(United States) Priscilla Sirichantho

=== Doubles champions ===
Year	Boys, 18 and under	Girls, 18 and under
1993	(Argentina) Sebastián Prieto (Venezuela) Jimy Szymanski	(France) Anne Pastor (Madagascar) Dally Randriantefy
1994	(Canada) Bobby Kokavec (Canada) Jocelyn Robichaud	(Italy) Alice Canepa (Italy) Maria Paola Zavagli
1995	(Venezuela) Kepler Orellana (Argentina) Mariano Zabaleta	(Italy) Giulia Casoni (Italy) Maria Paola Zavagli
1996	(Czech Republic) Petr Kralert (Czech Republic) Robin Vik	(Czech Republic) Michaela Paštiková (Czech Republic) Jitka Schönfeldová
1997	(United States) Mirko Pehar (Croatia) Lovro Zovko	(Belgium) Kim Clijsters (Hungary) Zsófia Gubacsi
1998	(Venezuela) José de Armas (Croatia) Lovro Zovko	(Argentina) Clarisa Fernández (Argentina) María Emilia Salerni
1999	(France) Julien Benneteau (France) Nicolas Mahut	(Japan) Maki Arai (United States) Bethanie Mattek
2000	(Mexico) Bruno Echagaray (Mexico) Santiago González	(Argentina) Gisela Dulko (Hungary) Anikó Kapros
2001	(Germany) Philipp Petzschner (Germany) Simon Stadler	(Germany) Anna-Lena Grönefeld (Czech Republic) Barbora Strýcová
2002	(United States) Scott Oudsema (United States) Phillip Simmonds	(Belarus) Darya Kustova (Belarus) Anastasia Yakimova
2003	(El Salvador) Rafael Arévalo (El Salvador) Jaime Cuellar	(New Zealand) Marina Erakovic (Russia) Ekaterina Kosminskaya
2004	(Venezuela) Piero Luisi (Venezuela) David Navarrete	(New Zealand) Marina Erakovic (Romania) Monica Niculescu
2005	(Argentina) Emiliano Massa (Argentina) Leonardo Mayer	(United States) Jennifer-Lee Heinser (United States) Elizabeth Plotkin
2006	(Russia) Danila Arsenov (Czech Republic) Roman Jebavý	(Romania) Sorana Cîrstea (Poland) Urszula Radwańska
2007	(Czech Republic) Roman Jebavý (Canada) Vasek Pospisil	(United States) Mallory Cecil (United States) Melanie Oudin
2008	(United States) Devin Britton (United States) Jarmere Jenkins	(United States) Lauren Embree (United States) Asia Muhammad
2009	(Russia) Mikhail Biryukov (Russia) Alexander Rumyantsev	(Belarus) Anna Orlik (Russia) Valeria Solovieva
2010	(Belgium) Julien Cagnina (Belgium) Jeroen Vanneste	(United States) Lauren Herring (United States) Madison Keys
2011	(United Kingdom) Liam Broady (United Kingdom) Joshua Ward-Hibbert	(Russia) Victoria Kan (Ukraine) Ganna Poznikhirenko
2012	(Chile) Cristian Garín (Chile) Nicolás Jarry	(United States) Gabrielle Andrews (United States) Taylor Townsend
2013	(Italy) Filippo Baldi (Austria) Lucas Miedler	(Australia) Naiktha Bains (United States) Tornado Alicia Black
2014	(United States) Stefan Kozlov (United States) Michael Mmoh	(United States) Cici Bellis (Czech Republic) Markéta Vondroušová
2015	(Japan) Yuta Shimizu (Japan) Yunosuke Tanaka	(India) Pranjala Yadlapalli (Slovenia) Tamara Zidanšek
2016	(Japan) Toru Horie (Japan) Yuta Shimizu	(Serbia) Olga Danilović (Russia) Anastasia Potapova
2017	(Czech Republic) Tomáš Macháč (Czech Republic) Ondřej Štyler	(Chinese Taipei) Joanna Garland (Japan) Naho Sato
2018	(Uzbekistan) Sergey Fomin (Belgium) Gauthier Onclin	(Hungary) Adrienn Nagy (South Korea) Park So-hyun
2019	(Poland) Mikolaj Lorens (Japan) Shunsuke Mitsui	(Philippines) Alexandra Eala (Belarus) Evialina Laskevich
2020	(Hungary) Péter Fajta (Hungary) Zsombor Velcz	(United States) Reese Brantmeier (United States) Kimmi Hance
2021	(Lithuania) Edas Butvilas (Jordan) Abedallah Shelbayh	(Croatia) Petra Marčinko (Russia) Diana Shnaider
2022	(Bulgaria) Adriano Dzhenev (Bulgaria) Iliyan Radulov	(United States) Tyra Grant (United States) Iva Jovic
2023	(United States) Andrew Delgado (United States) Matthew Forbes	(United States) Tyra Grant (2) (United States) Iva Jovic (2)
2024	Timofei Derepasko (Kazakhstan) Amir Omarkhanov	(Turkey) Deniz Dilek (Latvia) Beatrise Zeltina
2025	(Puerto Rico) Yannik Álvarez (Slovenia) Žiga Šeško	(Serbia) Anastasija Cvetković (India) Maaya Rajeshwaran Revathi

== See also ==
- Junior Orange Bowl (tennis)
