= Jacques Manset =

American tennis player

- Full name: Jacques O. Manset
- Country (sports): United States
- Born: October 11, 1958 (age 66); Santa Monica, California
- Plays: Right-handed

Singles
- Career record: 1–2
- Career titles: 0
- Highest ranking: No. 298 (December 23, 1985)

Doubles
- Career record: 3–5
- Career titles: 0
- Highest ranking: No. 194 (September 9, 1985)

Grand Slam doubles results
- US Open: 2R (1985)

Jacques Manset (born October 11, 1958) is a former professional tennis player from the United States.

== Biography ==
=== Early life and college ===
Manset is originally from Santa Monica, California, one of seven children of stockbroker George and Philadelphia born Peggy.

A graduate of Bishop Diego High, he was an All-American tennis player at UCLA, while studying for a degree in political science.

=== Professional tennis career ===
In the early 1980s he competed professionally on the international circuit.

He qualified for his first Grand Prix tournament at the 1983 Congoleum Classic in La Quinta. His best performance was a second round appearance at the Tokyo Outdoor tour event in 1985. He competed in the main doubles draw at the 1985 US Open partnering Brett Dickinson and the pair made the second round.

=== Personal life ===
Following his tennis career he worked briefly in New York as a NASDAQ trader, then returned to California, where he has been a financial advisor, since 1998 with Morgan Stanley.

At the age of 33 he began a battle with advanced melanoma which he has successfully fought.

He lives with his wife in Ventura and has three children.
