= Cacharel Caracas Open =

Tennis tournament in Venezuela

Caracas Open

Defunct tennis tournament
- Event name: Altamira International (1956–1968); Altamira International Invitation (1969); Altamira International (1970–1974); WCT Caracas (1975–1976); Cacharel Caracas Open (1982–1983)
- Tour: ILTF Caribbean Circuit (1956–1974); WCT Circuit (1975–1976); Grand Prix circuit (1982–1983)
- Founded: 1956; 69 years ago
- Abolished: 1983; 42 years ago
- Editions: 22
- Location: Miranda, Caracas, Venezuela
- Venue: Altimira Tennis Club
- Surface: Hard / outdoor

The Cacharel Caracas Open was a men's tennis tournament founded in 1956 as the Altamira International, also known as the Altamira International Invitation and Caracas International Championships. The tournament was played annually at the Altamira Tennis Club, Miranda, Caracas, Venezuela, usually in mid-March initially as part of the ILTF Caribbean Circuit.

The women's tournament ended in 1970 and the men's event continued. From 1975 to 1976 the men's editions were known as the Caracas WCT tournament before it was briefly discontinued in 1982 the tournament was revived under a new name before it was abolished in 1983.

== History ==
In 1927 the Venezuelan International Tennis Association was established and established a Venezuelan Lawn Tennis Championships at the first Altamira Tennis Club. In 1946 the Altamira Tennis Club was formally created. In 1956 the Altamira International, also known as the Altamira International Invitation tournament was established at Altamira Tennis Club, Caracas, Venezuela.

The Atamira International was organized as part of a spring (March to May) Caribbean Circuit which included tournaments in Jamaica (Kingston International Invitation), Puerto Rico (Caribe Hilton Championships), Trinidad and Tobago (Trinidad International) and Colombia, Colombia International (Ciudad de Barranquilla). The tournament attracted the top players of the day.

In 1970 the women's event was discontinued. The tournament continued under brand name Altamira International until 1974. Between 1975 and 1976 the men's event became part of the WCT Circuit and was known as the Caracas WCT tournament. In 1977 the tournament was not held for five years when it was revived and rebranded in 1982 as the Caracas Open played at the same venue until 1983.

== Finals ==
=== Men's singles ===
(incomplete roll)

| Year | Winner | Runner-up | Score |
|---|---|---|---|
Altamira International
| 1956 | (Italy) Orlando Sirola | (Australia) Mervyn Rose | 2–6, 3–6, 12–10, 6–4, 6–2 |
| 1958 | (United States) Budge Patty | (Chile) Luis Ayala | 6–3, 11–13, 3–6, 6–3, 6–4 |
| 1959 | (United States) Jon Douglas | (United Kingdom) Mike Davies | 6–3, 6–4, 6–3 |
| 1960 | (Spain) Andres Gimeno | (United Kingdom) Mike Davies | 6–3, 3–6, 6–4, 6–3 |
| 1961 | (Australia) Rod Laver | (Chile) Luis Ayala | 4–6, 6–4, 6–3, 4–6, 8–6 |
| 1962 | (Australia) Rod Laver (2) | (Australia) Roy Emerson | 9–7, 6–2, 6–0 |
| 1963 | (Spain) Manuel Santana | (Brazil) Thomaz Koch | 9–11, 8–6, 6–1, 6–4 |
| 1964 | (United States) Ron Holmberg | (Australia) Roy Emerson | 6–2, 6–4, 9–7 |
| 1965 | (France) Pierre Barthès | (Spain) Manuel Santana | 6–1, 6–4, 6–2 |
| 1966 | (Australia) Tony Roche | (Australia) John Newcombe | 0–6, 6–3, 6–4, 3–6, 6–4 |
| 1967 | (Socialist Federal Republic of Yugoslavia) Nikola Pilić | (Mexico) Rafael Osuna | 4–6, 7–5, 6–0, 4–6, 6–1 |
Open era
| 1968 | (United States) Marty Riessen | (United States) Cliff Richey | 6–1, 8–6, 6–1 |
Altamira International
| 1969 | (Brazil) Thomaz Koch | (United Kingdom) Mark Cox | 8–6, 6–3, 2–6, 6–4 |
| 1970 | (United States) Tom Gorman | (United Kingdom) Gerald Battrick | 6–2, 6–4, 3–6, 6–4 |
| 1971 | (Brazil) Thomaz Koch (2) | (Spain) Manuel Orantes | 7–6, 6–1, 6–3 |
| 1972 | (Spain) Manuel Orantes | (Pakistan) Haroon Rahim | 6–4, 7–5, 6–4 |
| 1973 | (United States) Tom Gorman | (France) Francois Jauffret | 6–3, 7–6, 6–3 |
| 1974 | (United States) Charlie Pasarell | (United States) Eddie Dibbs | 6–7, 6–2, 6–1 |
Altamira International/Caracas WCT
| 1975 | (Australia) Rod Laver (3) | (Mexico) Raul Ramirez | 7–6, 6–2 |
| 1976 | (Mexico) Raúl Ramírez | (Romania) Ilie Năstase | 6–3, 6–4 |
| 1977/1981 | Event suspended | | |
Caracas Open
| 1982 | (Mexico) Raúl Ramírez | (Hungary) Zoltán Kuhárszky | 4–6, 7–6, 6–3 |
| 1983 | (Mexico) Raúl Ramírez (2) | (United States) Morris Strode | 6–4, 6–2 |

=== Men's Doubles ===
| Year | Champions | Runners-up | Score |
|---|---|---|---|
| 1982 | (United States) Steve Meister (United States) Craig Wittus | (United States) Eric Fromm (United States) Cary Leeds | 6–7, 7–6, 6–4 |
| 1983 | (Chile) Jaime Fillol (United States) Stan Smith | (Ecuador) Andrés Gómez (Romania) Ilie Năstase | 6–7, 6–4, 6–3 |

=== Women's Singles ===
(incomplete roll)

| Year | Winner | Runner-up | Score |
|---|---|---|---|
Altamira International
| 1958 | (United States) Althea Gibson | (Brazil) Maria Bueno | 6–1, 4–6, 9–7 |
| 1959 | (United Kingdom) Christine Truman | (Brazil) Maria Bueno | 6–2, 6–3 |
| 1960 | (Brazil) Maria Bueno | (United Kingdom) Ann Haydon | 3–6, 7–5, 6–2 |
| 1961 | (Brazil) Maria Bueno (2) | (United States) Darlene Hard | 7–5, 6–1 |
| 1962 | (Brazil) Maria Bueno (3) | (United States) Darlene Hard | 6–2, 5–7, 6–2 |
| 1963 | (Brazil) Maria Bueno (4) | (Australia) Lesley Turner | 7–5, 8–6 |
| 1964 | (France) Francoise Durr | (United Kingdom) Rita Bentley | 6–3, 6–2 |
| 1965 | (Australia) Margaret Smith | (Australia) Lesley Turner | 4–6, 6–2, 7–5 |
| 1966 | (Argentina) Norma Baylon | (Australia) Gail Sherriff | 2–6, 7–5, 6–4 |
| 1967 | (United Kingdom) Ann Haydon Jones | (United Kingdom) Virginia Wade | 6–2, 6–3 |
Open era
| 1968 | (United Kingdom) Ann Haydon Jones (2) | (United States) Julie Heldman | 6–4, 11–9 |
Altamira International Open Invitation
| 1969 | (Australia) Margaret Smith Court (2) | (Brazil) Maria Bueno | w.o. |
Altamira International
| 1970 | (United States) Mary-Ann Eisel | (United States) Patti Hogan | 6–3 6–3 |

== Location and venue ==
The Altimira Tennis Club was founded in 1946 by the Venezuelan International Tennis Association (f.1927) who built the club and is headquartered there. Today the club consists of 11 tennis courts.

== Event names ==
The tournament throughout its history had been known by various names including:

- Altamira International
- Altamira International Invitation
- Altamira International Open Invitation
- Caracas International Championships
- Caracas WCT
- Copa Altimira International Invitation

== Event statistics ==
- Most men's titles: (Australia) Rod Laver & (Mexico) Raúl Ramírez (3)
- Most women's titles: (Brazil) Maria Bueno (4)
