= Eric Wilborts =

Dutch former professional tennis player (born 1964)

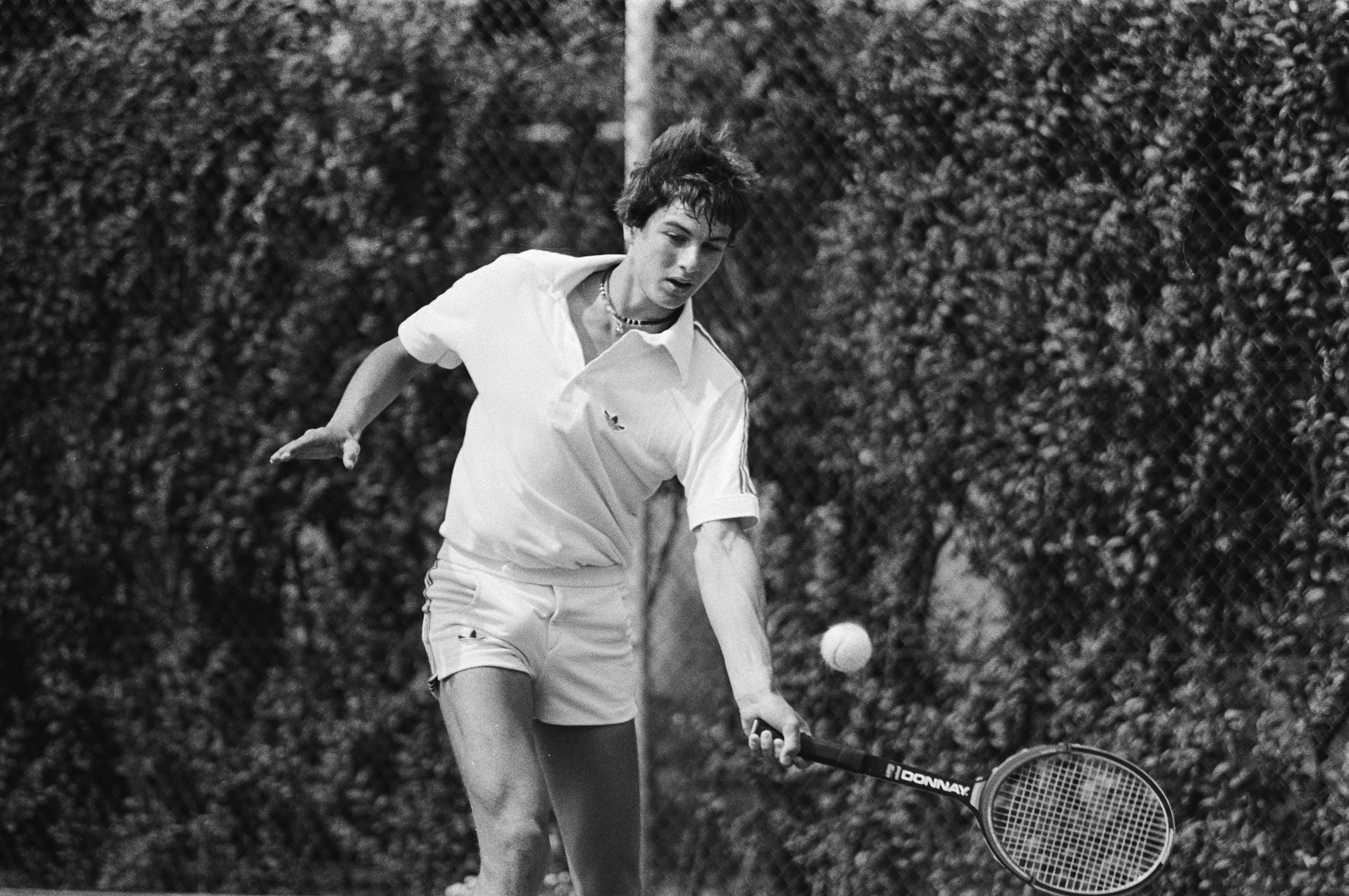
- Country (sports): Netherlands
- Born: 20 June 1964 (age 60); Tilburg, Netherlands
- Plays: Left-handed
- Prize money: $17,469

Singles
- Career record: 3–9
- Highest ranking: No. 269 (Jan 4, 1982)

Grand Slam singles results
- Wimbledon: Q1 (1981)

Doubles
- Career record: 0–5
- Highest ranking: No. 291 (24 Feb, 1986)

Grand Slam doubles results
- Wimbledon: Q2 (1981)

Eric Wilborts (born 20 June 1964) is a Dutch former professional tennis player.

Wilborts was a left-handed player from Tilburg who was ranked as high as three in the world junior rankings as a 16 year old. He was runner-up to Mike Falberg in the boys' singles final at the 1980 US Open.

While competing on the professional tour he reached a career high singles ranking of 269. His Grand Prix (ATP Tour) appearances include a win over Pat Du Pré at Rotterdam in 1981, where he was beaten in the next round by Jimmy Connors. He was a singles quarter-finalist at the 1981 Tel Aviv Open.

Between 1981 and 1983 he competed in four Davis Cup ties for the Netherlands, winning five of eight singles rubbers.

== See also ==
- List of Netherlands Davis Cup team representatives
