= 1982 Congoleum Classic =

- Date: February 15–21
- Edition: 9th
- Draw: 64S / 32D
- Prize money: $200,000
- Surface: Hard / outdoor
- Location: La Quinta, California, U.S.
- Venue: La Quinta Resort and Club

Champions

Singles
- (France) Yannick Noah

Doubles
- (United States) Brian Gottfried / (Mexico) Raúl Ramirez
- Indian Wells Masters

The 1982 Congoleum Classic was a men's tennis tournament played on outdoor hard courts. It was the 9th edition of the Indian Wells Masters and was part of the 1982 Volvo Grand Prix. It was played at the La Quinta Resort and Club in La Quinta, California in the United States and was held from February 15 through February 21, 1982. Fourth-seeded Yannick Noah won the singles title and earned $32,000 first-prize money.

== Finals ==
=== Singles ===
(France) Yannick Noah defeated (Czechoslovakia) Ivan Lendl 3–6, 6–2, 7–5

- It was Noah's 1st singles title of the year and the 8th of his career.

=== Doubles ===
(United States) Brian Gottfried / (Mexico) Raúl Ramirez defeated (United Kingdom) John Lloyd / (United States) Dick Stockton 6–4, 3–6, 6–2

- It was Gottfried's 1st title of the year and the 70th of his career. It was Ramirez's 1st title of the year and the 72nd of his career.
