= Craig Wittus =

American tennis player (born 1957)

- Country (sports): United States
- Born: February 4, 1957 (age 68); Detroit, Michigan, United States
- Height: 5 ft 11 in (1.80 m)
- Plays: Right-handed
- Prize money: $8,477

Singles
- Career titles: 0
- Highest ranking: No. 94 (11 July 1983)

Grand Slam singles results
- Australian Open: 1R (1981)
- French Open: 1R (1981, 1982)
- Wimbledon: 2R (1981, 1984)
- US Open: 1R (1981, 1983)

Doubles
- Career titles: 2
- Highest ranking: No. 42 (3 January 1983)

Grand Slam doubles results
- Australian Open: 1R (1980, 1984)
- French Open: 3R (1984)
- Wimbledon: 2R (1983)
- US Open: 3R (1982, 1984)

Craig Wittus (born February 24, 1957) is a former professional tennis player from the United States.

Wittus enjoyed most of his tennis success while playing doubles. During his career, he won two doubles titles. He achieved a career-high doubles ranking of world No. 42 in 1983.

== Career finals ==
=== Doubles (2 titles, 1 runner-up) ===
Result	W/L	Date	Tournament	Surface	Partner	Opponents	Score
Win	1–0	Feb 1982	Caracas, Venezuela	Hard	(United States) Steve Meister	(United States) Eric Fromm (United States) Cary Leeds	6–7, 7–6, 6–4
Win	2–0	Jul 1982	Boston, U.S.	Clay	(United States) Steve Meister	(South Africa) Freddie Sauer (South Africa) Schalk van der Merwe	6–2, 6–3
Loss	2–1	Aug 1982	Cleveland, U.S.	Hard	(United States) Matt Mitchell	(United States) Victor Amaya (United States) Hank Pfister	4–6, 6–7
