= Freddie Sauer =

South African tennis player

- Country (sports): South Africa
- Born: 2 August 1961 (age 64) Potgietersrus, South Africa
- Plays: Right-handed
- Prize money: $80,690

Singles
- Career record: 24–31
- Career titles: 0
- Highest ranking: No. 134 (3 Jan 1983)

Grand Slam singles results
- French Open: 1R (1982, 1983)
- Wimbledon: 1R (1982)
- US Open: 2R (1982)

Doubles
- Career record: 16–28
- Career titles: 0
- Highest ranking: No. 79 (3 Jan 1983)

Grand Slam doubles results
- French Open: 2R (1982)
- Wimbledon: 2R (1982)
- US Open: 1R (1982)

Freddie Sauer (born 2 August 1961) is a former professional tennis player from South Africa.

== Career ==
Sauer had his breakthrough year in 1982, when he was a quarter-finalist at Caracas, Cologne, Dortmund and Stowe. He defeated top seed Johan Kriek in his run to the Stowe quarter-finals. Also that year, Sauer had his only win in a Grand Slam tournament, beating John Letts in the US Open. In the second round he was beaten by Jaime Fillol in a close match, that was decided in a fifth set tiebreak.

On the doubles circuit, Sauer had his best performances partnering countryman Schalk van der Merwe. The pair were runners-up at Boston in 1982 and in the same year reached the second round at the French Open and Wimbledon Championships.

== Career finals ==
=== Doubles: 1 (0–1) ===
| Result | W/L | Date | Tournament | Surface | Partner | Opponents | Score |
|---|---|---|---|---|---|---|---|
| Loss | 0–1 | Jul 1982 | Boston, United States | Clay | (South Africa) Schalk van der Merwe | (United States) Steve Meister (United States) Craig Wittus | 2–6, 3–6 |

== Challenger titles ==
=== Doubles: (1) ===
| No. | Year | Tournament | Surface | Partner | Opponents | Score |
|---|---|---|---|---|---|---|
| 1. | 1982 | Johannesburg, South Africa | Hard | (South Africa) Schalk van der Merwe | (South Africa) Tian Viljoen (South Africa) Danie Visser | 6–2, 6–1 |
