= Schalk van der Merwe =

South African tennis player

- Country (sports): South Africa
- Born: 16 April 1961 Robertson, Cape Province
- Died: 24 January 2016 (aged 54) Ireland
- Plays: Right-handed

Singles
- Career record: 10–20
- Career titles: 0
- Highest ranking: No. 157 (3 January 1983)

Grand Slam singles results
- Wimbledon: 2R (1982)
- US Open: 3R (1982)

Doubles
- Career record: 23–32
- Career titles: 0
- Highest ranking: No. 81 (3 January 1983)

Grand Slam doubles results
- French Open: 2R (1982)
- Wimbledon: 2R (1981, 1982)

Mixed doubles

Grand Slam mixed doubles results
- Wimbledon: 3R (1982)
- US Open: 1R (1982)

Schalk van der Merwe (16 April 1961 – 24 January 2016) was a professional tennis player from South Africa.

His best performance in a Grand Slam tournament was a third-round appearance at the 1982 US Open, where he had wins over Derek Tarr and Raúl Ramírez. In the second round of the 1982 Wimbledon Championships, van der Merwe lost a marathon match to Steve Denton, which had to be stopped due to darkness when the scores were level at 10–10 in the fifth set. Play resumed the following day, and Denton won 13–11.

== Death ==
While in Ireland, where he was working as a medical doctor, van der Merwe was found dead in his car. The cause of death is still unknown, but he apparently suffered from high blood pressure in the time preceding his death.

== Career finals ==
=== Doubles: 1 (0–1) ===
Result	W/L	Date	Tournament	Surface	Partner	Opponents	Score
Loss	0–1	Jul 1982	Boston, United States	Clay	(South Africa) Freddie Sauer	(United States) Steve Meister (United States) Craig Wittus	2–6, 3–6

== Challenger titles ==
=== Doubles: (1) ===
No.	Year	Tournament	Surface	Partner	Opponents	Score
1.	1982	Johannesburg, South Africa	Hard	(South Africa) Freddie Sauer	(South Africa) Tian Viljoen (South Africa) Danie Visser	6–2, 6–1
