= Cary Leeds =

American tennis player

- Full name: Laurence C. Leeds III
- Country (sports): United States
- Born: April 16, 1957 New York City, United States
- Died: January 30, 2003 (aged 45)
- Plays: Right-handed

Singles
- Career record: 1–9
- Career titles: 0

Grand Slam singles results
- US Open: 2R (1982)

Doubles
- Career record: 27–37
- Career titles: 0

Grand Slam doubles results
- French Open: 2R (1981)
- Wimbledon: 2R (1982)
- US Open: 2R (1981, 1982)

Grand Slam mixed doubles results
- French Open: 1R (1981)
- Wimbledon: SF (1981)
- US Open: 2R (1980)

Laurence C. "Cary" Leeds III (April 16, 1957 – January 30, 2003) was an American professional tennis player.

Leeds was the son of New York City banker Larry Leeds and Tel Aviv-born Dalia Benary. A varsity tennis player while at Yale University, Leeds won a national indoor doubles title with Matt Doyle in 1977 and graduated in 1979 with a B.A.

Active on the professional tour in the 1980s, Leeds featured most prominently in doubles and made three Grand Prix finals. He was a mixed doubles semi-finalist at the 1981 Wimbledon Championships, partnering Sherry Acker.

The Cary Leeds Center in the South Bronx, New York is named in his honor, set up by his family as a way to memorialize him after his death in 2003. It was opened in 2015.

== Grand Prix career finals ==
=== Doubles: 3 (0–3) ===
Result	W-L	Date	Tournament	Surface	Partner	Opponents	Score
Loss	0–1	Jun 1980	Brussels, Belgium	Clay	(United States) Eric Fromm	(United States) Steve Krulevitz (Belgium) Thierry Stevaux	3–6, 5–7
Loss	0–2	Oct 1980	Tel Aviv, Israel	Hard	(United States) Eric Fromm	(Sweden) Per Hjertquist (United States) Steve Krulevitz	6–7, 3–6
Loss	0–3	Feb 1982	Caracas, Venezuela	Hard	(United States) Eric Fromm	(United States) Steve Meister (United States) Craig Wittus	7–6, 6–7, 4–6
