= Steve Meister =

American tennis player

- Country (sports): United States
- Born: April 21, 1958 (age 67) New York, New York, U.S.
- Height: 6 ft 4 in (1.93 m)
- Plays: Right-handed
- College: Princeton University

Singles
- Career record: 30–62
- Career titles: 0
- Highest ranking: No. 69 (6 August 1984)

Doubles
- Career record: 107–97
- Career titles: 6
- Highest ranking: No. 20 (16 July 1984)

Steve Meister (born April 21, 1958) is a former professional tennis player from the United States. Meister's highest singles ranking was World No. 69, which he reached in August 1984. During his career, he won 6 doubles titles and achieved a career-high doubles ranking of World No. 20 in July 1984.

Meister was born in New York City, and is Jewish. He graduated from Princeton University in 1980 with a degree in Civil Engineering. He turned professional in May 1980, and retired in 1986.

He then founded Meister Financial Group, Inc. in 1987 as a wholesale mortgage lending corporation. He served as the U.S. Men’s Tennis Coach of the 1989 Maccabiah Games and the 1993 Maccabiah Games. He received a Master of Science in Finance in 2004 from Florida International University.

He was elected to the Miami-Dade County Hall of Fame in 2005.

== Career finals ==
=== Doubles (6 titles, 3 runner-ups) ===
Result	W/L	Date	Tournament	Surface	Partner	Opponents	Score
Win	1–0	1981	Tel Aviv, Israel	Hard	(United States) Van Winitsky	(United Kingdom) John Feaver (United States) Steve Krulevitz	3–6, 6–3, 6–3
Win	2–0	1982	Caracas, Venezuela	Hard	(United States) Craig Wittus	(United States) Eric Fromm (United States) Cary Leeds	6–7, 7–6, 6–4
Win	3–0	1982	Boston, U.S.	Clay	(United States) Craig Wittus	(South Africa) Freddie Sauer (South Africa) Schalk van der Merwe	6–2, 6–3
Win	4–0	1983	Tampa, U.S.	Carpet	(United States) Tony Giammalva	(United States) Eric Fromm (United States) Drew Gitlin	3–6, 6–1, 7–5
Win	5–0	1983	Maui, U.S.	Hard	(United States) Tony Giammalva	(United States) Mike Bauer (United States) Scott Davis	6–3, 5–7, 6–4
Loss	5–1	1983	Hong Kong	Hard	(United States) Sammy Giammalva Jr.	(United States) Drew Gitlin (Australia) Craig Miller	2–6, 2–6
Win	6–1	1983	Johannesburg, South Africa	Hard	(United States) Brian Teacher	(Ecuador) Andrés Gómez (United States) Sherwood Stewart	6–7, 7–6, 6–2
Loss	6–2	1984	Tokyo Outdoor, Japan	Hard	(United States) Mark Dickson	(United States) David Dowlen (Nigeria) Nduka Odizor	7–6, 4–6, 3–6
Loss	6–3	1984	Johannesburg, South Africa	Hard	(United States) Eliot Teltscher	(United States) Tracy Delatte (Paraguay) Francisco González	6–7, 1–6
