= Tian Viljoen =

South African tennis player

- Full name: Christian "Tian" Viljoen
- Country (sports): South Africa
- Born: 10 April 1961 (age 64); Pretoria, South Africa
- Height: 1.93 m (6 ft 4 in)
- Plays: Right-handed

Singles
- Career record: 5–7
- Career titles: 0
- Highest ranking: No. 282 (4 January 1982)

Grand Slam singles results
- Wimbledon: 2R (1983)

Doubles
- Career record: 35–33
- Career titles: 0
- Highest ranking: No. 49 (3 January 1983)

Grand Slam doubles results
- French Open: 3R (1983)
- Wimbledon: 3R (1983)
- US Open: 3R (1983)

Christian "Tian" Viljoen (born 10 April 1961) is a former professional tennis player from South Africa. He enjoyed most of his tennis success while playing doubles. During his career, he finished runner-up in doubles at three events. He achieved a career-high doubles ranking of world No. 49 in January 1983.

== Career finals ==
=== Doubles (3 runner-ups) ===
Result	W-L	Date	Tournament	Surface	Partner	Opponents	Score
Loss	0–1	May 1982	Munich, West Germany	Clay	(South Africa) Danie Visser	(United States) Chip Hooper (United States) Mel Purcell	4–6, 6–7
Loss	0–2	Feb 1983	La Quinta, U.S.	Hard	(South Africa) Danie Visser	(United States) Brian Gottfried (Mexico) Raúl Ramírez	3–6, 3–6
Loss	0–3	Sep 1983	Palermo, Italy	Clay	(South Africa) Danie Visser	(Peru) Pablo Arraya (Argentina) José Luis Clerc	6–1, 4–6, 4–6
