= Eric Fromm =

American tennis player

- Country (sports): United States
- Born: June 27, 1958 (age 67) Queens, New York, United States
- Height: 1.78 m (5 ft 10 in)
- Plays: Right-handed (one-handed backhand)

Singles
- Career record: 51–82
- Career titles: 0
- Highest ranking: No. 46 (20 June 1986)

Grand Slam singles results
- French Open: 4R (1983)
- Wimbledon: 2R (1981, 1982)
- US Open: 2R (1982, 1983)

Doubles
- Career record: 95–106
- Career titles: 0
- Highest ranking: No. 45 (2 January 1984)

Grand Slam doubles results
- French Open: SF (1984)
- Wimbledon: 2R (1982)
- US Open: 2R (1979–82, 1984)

Grand Slam mixed doubles results
- French Open: 2R (1981, 1984)
- Wimbledon: 3R (1981, 1983)
- US Open: QF (1983)

Eric Fromm (born June 27, 1958) is a former professional tennis player from the United States.

== Tennis career ==
Fromm's best result at a Grand Slam was reaching the fourth round of the French Open in 1983 in singles, where he lost in straight sets to world No. 1 in the world Jimmy Connors and the semifinals of the 1984 French Open doubles with Shlomo Glickstein of Israel, where they lost in five sets to Yannick Noah and Henri Leconte. Fromm's career highlights include a top 50 ranking in singles and top 30 ranking in doubles as well as wins over Yannick Noah at Wimbledon and Pat Cash at the US Open. He retired from the pro tour in 1986 and was inducted into the Eastern Tennis Hall of Fame in 2016.

== After pro tennis ==
Fromm completed his undergraduate degree at Columbia University and earned an MBA from Columbia Business School. He joined SPORTIME in 2002 as managing partner of SPORTIME Harbor Island in Mamaroneck, New York and was promoted to the executive management team of SPORTIME in 2007. He became general manager and director of Tennis of the historic Orange Lawn Tennis Club in 2018.

Fromm raised his family in Chappaqua, New York with his wife Lori. Fromm has three children, a son Daniel, and two daughters, Carly and Alana. Fromm and his wife reside in New Rochelle, New York.

== Career finals ==
=== Singles (1 runner-up) ===
Result	W/L	Date	Tournament	Surface	Opponent	Score
Loss	0–1	Aug 1982	Stowe, U.S.	Hard	(United States) Jay Lapidus	4–6, 2–6

=== Doubles (9 runner-ups) ===
Result	W/L	Date	Tournament	Surface	Partner	Opponents	Score
Loss	0–1	Jun 1980	Brussels, Belgium	Clay	(United States) Cary Leeds	(United States) Steve Krulevitz (Belgium) Thierry Stevaux	3–6, 5–7
Loss	0–2	Oct 1980	Tel Aviv, Israel	Hard	(United States) Cary Leeds	(Sweden) Per Hjertquist (United States) Steve Krulevitz	6–7, 3–6
Loss	0–3	May 1981	Munich, West Germany	Clay	(Israel) Shlomo Glickstein	(Australia) David Carter (Australia) Paul Kronk	3–6, 4–6
Loss	0–4	Feb 1982	Caracas, Venezuela	Hard	(United States) Cary Leeds	(United States) Steve Meister (United States) Craig Wittus	7–6, 6–7, 4–6
Loss	0–5	Aug 1982	North Conway, U.S.	Clay	(Peru) Pablo Arraya	(United States) Sherwood Stewart (United States) Ferdi Taygan	2–6, 6–7
Loss	0–6	Aug 1982	Stowe, U.S.	Hard	(United States) Mike Fishbach	(United States) Andy Andrews (United States) John Sadri	3–6, 4–6
Loss	0–7	Apr 1983	Tampa, U.S.	Carpet	(United States) Drew Gitlin	(United States) Tony Giammalva (United States) Steve Meister	6–3, 1–6, 5–7
Loss	0–8	Jul 1983	North Conway, U.S.	Clay	(United States) Drew Gitlin	(Australia) Mark Edmondson (United States) Sherwood Stewart	6–7, 1–6
Loss	0–9	May 1984	Munich, West Germany	Clay	(Romania) Florin Segărceanu	(West Germany) Boris Becker (Poland) Wojciech Fibak	4–6, 6–4, 1–6
