= Steve Krulevitz =

American-Israeli tennis player

- Country (sports): United States; Israel
- Residence: Brooklandville, Maryland, U.S.
- Born: May 30, 1951 (age 75) Baltimore, Maryland, U.S.
- Height: 1.75 m (5 ft 9 in)
- Turned pro: 1970
- Plays: Right-handed (one-handed backhand)

Singles
- Career record: 121–198
- Career titles: 0
- Highest ranking: No. 70

Grand Slam singles results
- Australian Open: 3R (1979)
- French Open: 3R (1976)
- Wimbledon: 3R (1976)
- US Open: 2R (1971, 1976, 1977, 1979, 1980, 1981)

Doubles
- Career record: 130–196
- Career titles: 4
- Highest ranking: No. 150

Grand Slam doubles results
- Australian Open: SF (1981)
- French Open: 3R (1981, 1982)
- Wimbledon: 3R (1974)
- US Open: 3R (1982)
Medal record
Maccabiah Games
Gold medal – first place	1977 Tel Aviv	Men's singles
Gold medal – first place	1977 Tel Aviv	Men's doubles

Steve "Lightning" Krulevitz (born May 30, 1951) is an American-Israeli former professional tennis player, and current coach. Playing for UCLA, he was an All-American. He won gold medals for the United States in singles and doubles at the 1977 Maccabiah Games in Israel. He played # 1 for the Israel Davis Cup team from 1978–80. His highest world singles ranking was No. 70. He was in the bottom of the top 100 on the men’s tour from 1974 to 1983.

== Early life ==
Krulevitz was born in Baltimore, Maryland, raised in Park Heights a few blocks from the Pimlico Race Course, and lives in Brooklandville, Maryland. He has dual American-Israeli citizenship, and is Jewish. He became a bar mitzvah at Baltimore Hebrew Congregation.

During the Holocaust, when the Nazis implemented their Final Solution to the ‘Jewish Question’, his Polish grandfather’s mother, father, sisters, brother, aunts, uncles, and cousins, 22 people in all, were shipped to the Auschwitz concentration camp where they were killed.

== Early career ==
From the age of eight or nine years old, he was friends with Harold Solomon (who was one year younger), with whom he later played on the pro tour. In 1967 he became the youngest Maryland State Men’s champion, at 15 years of age.

Krulevitz attended the Park School of Baltimore ('69) and won the Maryland Scholastic Association Singles Championship four times (1966–69). He was also the point guard on the school's undefeated 1969 basketball team, and played soccer and lacrosse (leading the conference in scoring in 1968). He won First Team honors in soccer and basketball in 1969. He was a member of the United States Junior Davis Cup Team.

He earned a Bachelor of Science degree in Kinesiology from UCLA in 1973. There, he played for the UCLA Bruins tennis team and was named All-American in 1973, along with teammates Brian Teacher, Jeff Austin, and Bob Kreiss.

== Professional career ==
Krulevitz was among the top 100 players in the world for from 1974 to 1983. He turned pro in 1973, at 22 years of age. He competed in 9 Wimbledons, 13 US Opens, 8 French Opens, and 2 Australian Opens.

His career singles titles include Travemünde, Germany (1980) and Chichester, England (1981). Krulevitz's career doubles titles include the Stowe Open (with Mike Cahill) in 1979, Sarasota (with Ilie Nastase) in 1979, and Brussels (with Thierry Stevaux) in 1980. He made it to the 3rd round of Wimbledon and the French Open in 1976, and to the 3rd round of the Australian Open in 1979. In May 1982 he lost in the finals of the Tampere Open, in Finland.

In May 1974 Krulevitz defeated world No. 25 Raul Ramirez in Rome, Italy. In March 1976 he beat world No. 21 Vijay Amritraj in Palm Springs, California. In July 1980 he defeated world No. 12 Jose Higueras in Gstaad, Switzerland. In June 1981 he beat World # 20 Adriano Panatta in Brussels, Belgium.

Krulevitz won gold medals in singles and doubles (with Larry Nagler) for the United States at the 1977 Maccabiah Games in Tel Aviv, Israel.

== Davis Cup ==
Krulevitz played # 1 for the Israel Davis Cup team from 1978–1980, and coached that Davis Cup team as well. He was 4–5 in Davis Cup competition for Israel. He said in 1978: "I would never live anyplace but the States, but there is definitely a part of me that has strong feelings for Israel. It is a fantastic, courageous country."

== Honors ==
Krulevitz was inducted into the USTA Mid-Atlantic Tennis Hall of Fame in 1993.

He was inducted into the Maryland State Athletic Hall of Fame in 2019.

== Coaching ==
Krulevitz's students include Gilad Bloom (Israel), Jaime Yzaga (Peru), Reed Cordish, and Vince Spadea.

He is the varsity tennis head coach at Gilman School. He led the Greyhounds to a 12th-place finish at the high school national championships in Kentucky, and a 16th-place finish at the 2016 National Invitational Boys High School Team Tennis Tournament, located in Newport Beach, California. He also led the team to eight consecutive A Conference titles in the Maryland Interscholastic Athletic Association. The team set an MIAA record for most consecutive titles, set a record for most championships in the year history of the league, and set a new school record for most consecutive championships in its 60-year history.

Krulevitz founded the Krulevitz Tennis Program in 1984, with two 16-week indoor sessions for players of all ages from September through April and a 10-week outdoor camp June through August, with 90 students per week.

== Career finals ==
=== Doubles (4 titles, 3 runner-ups) ===
Result	W/L	Date	Tournament	Surface	Partner	Opponents	Score
Loss	0–1	Feb 1976	Salisbury, U.S.	Carpet (i)	(United States) Trey Waltke	(United States) Fred McNair (United States) Sherwood Stewart	3–6, 2–6
Win	1–1	Feb 1979	Sarasota, U.S.	Carpet (i)	(Romania) Ilie Năstase	(Australia) John James (United States) Keith Richardson	7–6, 6–3
Win	2–1	Aug 1979	Stowe, U.S.	Hard	(United States) Mike Cahill	(India) Anand Amritraj (Australia) Colin Dibley	3–6, 6–3, 6–4
Win	3–1	Jun 1980	Brussels, Belgium	Clay	(Belgium) Thierry Stevaux	(United States) Eric Fromm (United States) Cary Leeds	6–3, 7–5
Win	4–1	Oct 1980	Tel Aviv, Israel	Hard	(Sweden) Per Hjertquist	(United States) Eric Fromm (United States) Cary Leeds	7–6, 6–3
Loss	4–2	Oct 1981	Tel Aviv, Israel	Hard	(United Kingdom) John Feaver	(United States) Steve Meister (United States) Van Winitsky	6–3, 3–6, 3–6
Loss	4–3	Jun 1983	Venice, Italy	Clay	(Hungary) Zoltán Kuhárszky	(Paraguay) Francisco González (Paraguay) Víctor Pecci	1–6, 2–6

== Writing ==
Krulevitz authored Lightning Strikes: The Life and Times of a Professional Tour Tennis Player, 2017. It describes his life growing up in Baltimore, and as a professional tennis player.

== See also ==
- List of select Jewish tennis players
