= Mel Purcell =

American tennis player (born 1959)

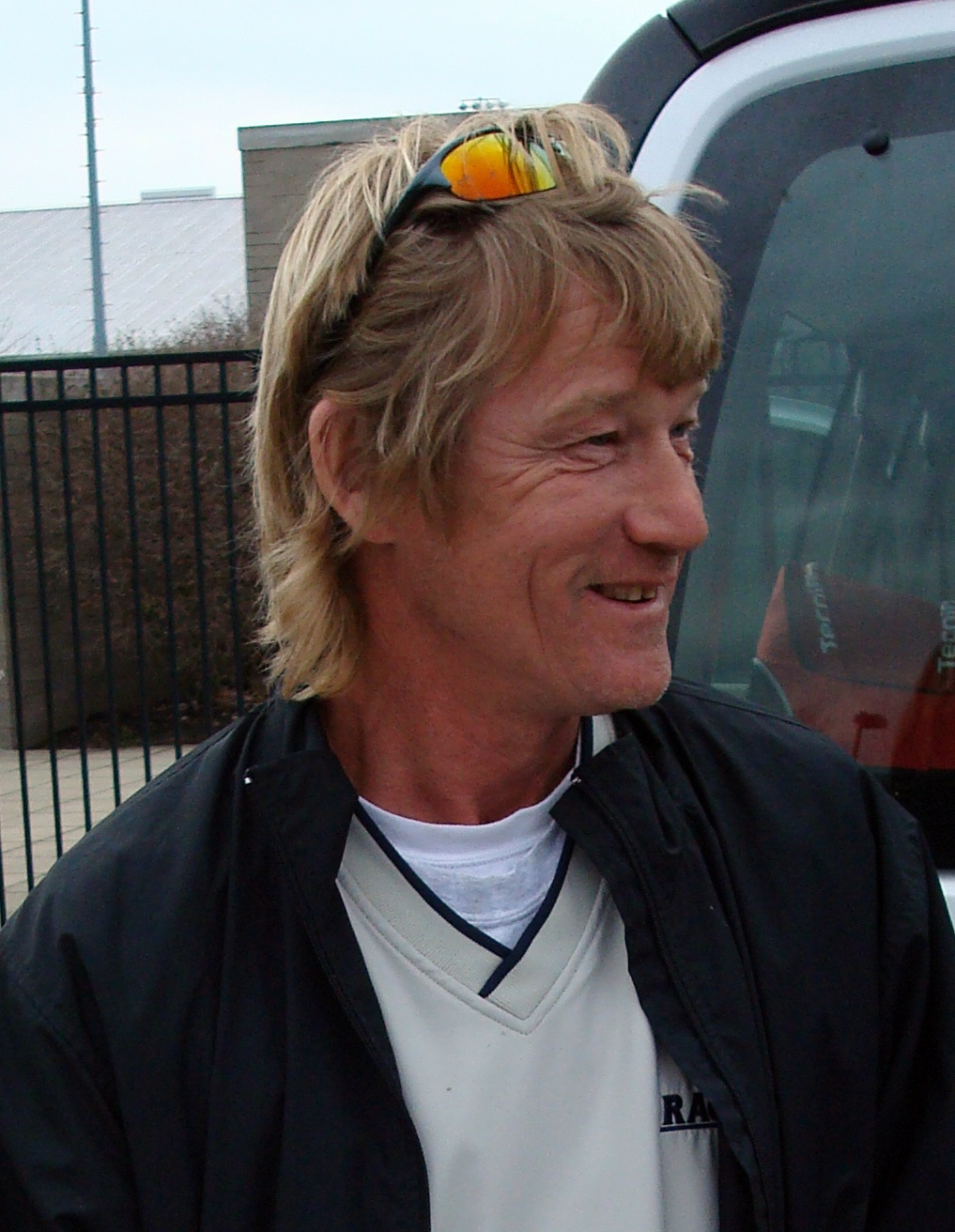
- Country (sports): United States
- Residence: Murray, KY
- Born: July 18, 1959 (age 67) Joplin, MO
- Height: 1.77 m (5 ft 10 in)
- Turned pro: 1979
- Retired: 1988
- Plays: Right-handed (one-handed backhand)
- Prize money: $797,197

Singles
- Career record: 190–164
- Career titles: 3
- Highest ranking: No. 21 (November 3, 1980)

Grand Slam singles results
- French Open: 4R (1981, 1982)
- Wimbledon: QF (1983)
- US Open: 3R (1980, 1981, 1982, 1986)

Doubles
- Career record: 118–139
- Career titles: 4
- Highest ranking: No. 47 (August 20, 1984)

Grand Slam doubles results
- French Open: QF (1981)
- Wimbledon: 3R (1984)
- US Open: 3R (1978, 1982, 1983)

Mel Purcell (born July 18, 1959) is a former professional tennis player and coach from the U.S. His career-high singles ranking was world No. 21, achieved in November 1980. Purcell's finest moment was when he reached the quarterfinals of Wimbledon in 1983. He was head coach of the Murray State University men's tennis team from 1996 to 2016.

== Early years ==
Purcell grew up in Murray, Kentucky, and played in the Kentucky State Tennis Tournament as a fifth-grader, and won two state doubles crowns with older brother Del as a middle schooler. He made the state singles finals three straight years, winning as a senior.

Purcell graduated Murray High School and went on to Memphis State University (now the University of Memphis), where he played for one year. He transferred to the University of Tennessee, where in 1980 he won an NCAA doubles championship with teammate Rodney Harmon.

== Pro career ==
Purcell made his debut on the professional circuit in Summer 1980. As a wild card entrant at the Washington (D.C.) Star Tournament, he upset top-seeded Eddie Dibbs. Two weeks later, he qualified for a spot in the U.S. Clay Courts, where he beat Hank Pfister and top-10 ranked Harold Solomon, then lost in the finals to José Luis Clerc. Purcell saw his Association of Tennis Professionals (ATP) ranking soar from the 300s to the top 40 and was crowned 1980 ATP Rookie of the Year.

The next year, he played at Wimbledon, the first of six appearances (1981–85, 1987). He reached the quarterfinals in 1983, beating Tim Wilkison, Stuart Bale, Andreas Maurer and Brian Gottfried.

Purcell played in the US Open 10 times (1978–87) where he recorded victories over Stan Smith, Andrés Gómez and Ilie Năstase, among others. During this time, he was part of a rare match where he lost to fifth-seeded José Luis Clerc in the third round of the 1981 US Open despite winning two sets 6–0. He competed in the French Open six times (1981–84, 1987–88) where he twice reached the fourth round in singles and in 1981 reached the doubles quarterfinals with Vincent Van Patten.

Another career highlight was beating Ivan Lendl at the U.S. Pro Tennis Championships in Boston in 1982.

Injuries to his elbow from a car accident and a pulled stomach muscle slowed his career in 1985, but a year later, he beat Boris Becker in the German Open.

Purcell won three ATP singles titles in 1981: at Atlanta, Tampa and Tel Aviv. He also teamed to claim four doubles titles: at Delray Beach (1982 with Chip Hooper), Munich (1982 with Eliot Teltscher) and Vienna (1983 with Stan Smith and 1987 with Tim Wilkison).

== Awards and accolades ==
In 2015, Purcell was inducted into The Kentucky Athletic Hall of Fame.

== Career finals ==
=== Singles (3 titles, 5 runner-ups) ===
Result	W/L	Date	Tournament	Surface	Opponent	Score
Loss	0–1	Aug 1980	Indianapolis, U.S.	Clay	(Argentina) José Luis Clerc	5–7, 3–6
Win	1–1	Mar 1981	Tampa, U.S.	Hard	(United States) Jeff Borowiak	4–6, 6–4, 6–3
Win	2–1	Aug 1981	Atlanta, U.S.	Hard	(France) Gilles Moretton	6–4, 6–2
Win	3–1	Oct 1981	Tel Aviv, Israel	Hard	(Sweden) Per Hjertquist	6–1, 6–1
Loss	3–2	Apr 1982	Los Angeles, U.S.	Hard	(United States) Jimmy Connors	2–6, 1–6
Loss	3–3	Jul 1982	Boston, U.S.	Clay	(Argentina) Guillermo Vilas	4–6, 0–6
Loss	3–4	Mar 1983	Monte Carlo, Monaco	Clay	(Sweden) Mats Wilander	1–6, 2–6, 3–6
Loss	3–5	Oct 1983	Vienna, Austria	Hard (i)	(United States) Brian Gottfried	2–6, 3–6, 5–7

=== Doubles (4 titles, 4 runner-ups) ===
Result	W/L	Date	Tournament	Surface	Partner	Opponents	Score
Loss	0–1	Mar 1981	Denver, U.S.	Carpet (i)	(United States) Dick Stockton	(Zimbabwe) Andrew Pattison (United States) Butch Walts	3–6, 4–6
Win	1–1	Jan 1982	Delray Beach WCT, U.S.	Clay	(United States) Eliot Teltscher	(Czechoslovakia) Tomáš Šmíd (Hungary) Balázs Taróczy	6–4, 7–6
Loss	1–2	Feb 1982	Monterrey, Mexico	Carpet (i)	(United States) Tracy Delatte	(United States) Victor Amaya (United States) Hank Pfister	3–6, 7–6, 3–6
Win	2–2	May 1982	Munich, Germany	Clay	(United States) Chip Hooper	(South Africa) Tian Viljoen (South Africa) Danie Visser	6–4, 7–6
Win	3–2	Oct 1983	Vienna, Austria	Carpet (i)	(United States) Stan Smith	(Brazil) Marcos Hocevar (Brazil) Cássio Motta	6–3, 6–4
Loss	3–3	Jul 1986	Boston, U.S.	Clay	(United States) Dan Cassidy	(Chile) Hans Gildemeister (Ecuador) Andrés Gómez	6–4, 5–7, 0–6
Loss	3–4	Oct 1987	Scottsdale, U.S.	Hard	(United States) Dan Goldie	(United States) Rick Leach (United States) Jim Pugh	3–6, 2–6
Win	4–4	Oct 1987	Vienna, Austria	Carpet (i)	(United States) Tim Wilkison	(Spain) Emilio Sánchez (Spain) Javier Sánchez	6–3, 7–5

== Today ==
Purcell was the head men's tennis coach at Murray State University from 1996 – when he succeeded his father, hall of fame coach Bennie Purcell – until the university dropped the sport in 2016. He led Murray State to back-to-back Ohio Valley Conference titles in 2001 and 2002 and was named OVC Coach of the Year both seasons.

He was still playing matches on the Jimmy Connors Champions Tour in his 40s, where he played against and sometimes beat Jimmy Connors, Björn Borg, and John McEnroe.

Purcell hosts a tennis camp every summer for children and teens.
