= 1970 U.S. Pro Tennis Championships – Doubles =

Doubles
- 1970 U.S. Pro Tennis Championships

Final
- Champion: (Australia) Roy Emerson (Australia) Rod Laver
- Runner-up: (United Arab Republic) Ismail El Shafei (Denmark) Ismail El Shafei
- Score: 6–1, 7–6

Details
- Draw: 16

Events
Singles	Doubles
← 1969 ·	U.S. Pro Tennis Championships	· 1971 →

The 1970 U.S. Pro Tennis Championships – Doubles was an event of the 1970 U.S. Pro Tennis Championships men's tennis tournament played on outdoor hard courts at the Longwood Cricket Club in Boston, United States from August 3 through August 9, 1970. The draw consisted of 16 teams. Roy Emerson and Rod Laver won the doubles title, defeating Ismail El Shafei and Ismail El Shafei in the final, 6–1, 7–6.

== Draw ==
=== Key ===
- Q = Qualifier
- WC = Wild card
- LL = Lucky loser
- Alt = Alternate
- SE = Special exempt
- PR = Protected ranking
- ITF = ITF entry
- JE = Junior exempt
- w/o = Walkover
- r = Retired
- d = Defaulted
- SR = Special ranking

=== Finals ===
First round
(Australia) K Rosewall (Australia) F Stolle	6	7
(Australia) B Bowrey (United States) C Pasarell	3	6
(Chile) P Cornejo (Chile) J Fillol	6	3	6
(France) P Barthès (South Africa) R Moore	4	6	3
(Australia) R Emerson (Australia) R Laver	6	6
(Australia) D Crealy (Czechoslovakia) J Kodeš	3	0
(Australia) R Ruffels (Australia) A Stone	6	6	7
(United Kingdom) M Cox (United Kingdom) G Stilwell	7	4	6
(United States) C Graebner (United States) B Lutz	6	7
(South Africa) C Drysdale (United Kingdom) R Taylor	2	6
(United States) A Ashe (United States) D Ralston	1	6	6
(United States) M Riessen (Netherlands) T Okker	6	4	3
(United States) T Gorman (United States) C Richey	7	6
(Spain) A Gimeno (United States) R Holmberg	6	4
(Egypt) I El Shafei (Denmark) T Ulrich	w/o
(Australia) J Newcombe (Australia) T Roche

Quarterfinals
(Australia) K Rosewall (Australia) F Stolle	6	6
(Chile) P Cornejo (Chile) J Fillol	3	3
(Australia) R Emerson (Australia) R Laver	6	6
(Australia) R Ruffels (Australia) A Stone	1	2
(United States) C Graebner (United States) B Lutz	6	6
(United States) A Ashe (United States) D Ralston	3	4
(United States) T Gorman (United States) C Richey	7	1	2
(Egypt) I El Shafei (Denmark) T Ulrich	5	6	6

Semifinals
(Australia) K Rosewall (Australia) F Stolle	4	5
(Australia) R Emerson (Australia) R Laver	6	7
(United States) C Graebner (United States) B Lutz	6	5
(Egypt) I El Shafei (Denmark) T Ulrich	7	7

Final
(Australia) R Emerson (Australia) R Laver	6	7
(Egypt) I El Shafei (Denmark) T Ulrich	1	6
