= 1969 U.S. Pro Tennis Championships – Singles =

Singles
- 1969 U.S. Pro Tennis Championships

Final
- Champion: (Australia) Rod Laver
- Runner-up: (Australia) John Newcombe
- Score: 7–5, 6–2, 4–6, 6–1

Details
- Draw: 16

Events
Singles	Doubles
← 1968 ·	U.S. Pro Tennis Championships	· 1970 →

The 1969 U.S. Pro Tennis Championships – Singles was an event of the 1969 U.S. Pro Tennis Championships men's tennis tournament played on outdoor hard courts at the Longwood Cricket Club in Boston, United States from July 9 through July 15, 1969. First-seeded Rod Laver was the defending champion and regained his singles title, defeating second-seeded John Newcombe in the final, 7–5, 6–2, 4–6, 6–1.

== Draw ==
=== Key ===
- Q = Qualifier
- WC = Wild card
- LL = Lucky loser
- Alt = Alternate
- ITF = ITF entry
- PR = Protected ranking
- SR = Special ranking
- SE = Special exempt
- JE = Junior exempt
- JR = Junior Accelerator Programme entrant
- CO = College Accelerator Programme entrant
- NG = Next Gen Accelerator Program entrant
- w/o = Walkover
- r = Retired
- d = Defaulted

First Round
1	(Australia) Rod Laver	6	6
(South Africa) Raymond Moore	2	2
(Netherlands) Tom Okker	6	6
(United States) Butch Buchholz	4	2
(United States) Pancho Gonzales	6	6
(United States) Dennis Ralston	2	3
(Australia) Ken Rosewall	6	6
(Ecuador) Pancho Segura	3	3
(Australia) Fred Stolle	2	6	7
(Australia) Tony Roche	6	3	5
(United States) Ronald Holmberg	4	7	6
(South Africa) Cliff Drysdale	6	5	4
(France) Pierre Barthès	3	6	6
(United States) Marty Riessen	6	3	4
(United States) Alex Olmedo	3	5
2	(Australia) John Newcombe	6	7

Quarterfinals
1	(Australia) Rod Laver	6	10
(Netherlands) Tom Okker	3	8
(United States) Pancho Gonzales	9	7	2
(Australia) Ken Rosewall	7	9	6
(Australia) Fred Stolle	3	6	6
(United States) Ronald Holmberg	6	4	2
(France) Pierre Barthès	5	1
2	(Australia) John Newcombe	7	6

Semifinals
1	(Australia) Rod Laver	6	5	6	6
(Australia) Ken Rosewall	3	7	2	3
(Australia) Fred Stolle	3	4	4
2	(Australia) John Newcombe	6	6	6

Final
1	(Australia) Rod Laver	7	6	4	6
2	(Australia) John Newcombe	5	2	6	1

== See also ==
- Laver–Rosewall rivalry
