= 1970 U.S. Pro Tennis Championships – Singles =

Singles
- 1970 U.S. Pro Tennis Championships

Final
- Champion: (Australia) Tony Roche
- Runner-up: (Australia) Rod Laver
- Score: 3–6, 6–4, 1–6, 6–2, 6–2

Details
- Draw: 32
- Seeds: 8

Events
Singles	Doubles
← 1969 ·	U.S. Pro Tennis Championships	· 1971 →

The 1970 U.S. Pro Tennis Championships was a men's tennis tournament played on outdoor hard courts at the Longwood Cricket Club in Boston, USA. It was classified as a Glass 1 category tournament and was part of the 1970 Grand Prix circuit. It was the 43rd edition of the tournament and was held from August 3 through August 9, 1970. Fourth-seeded Tony Roche won the singles title and the accompanying $12,000 first prize money.

== Seeds ==
Champion seeds are indicated in bold text while text in italics indicates the round in which those seeds were eliminated.

1. (Australia) Rod Laver (final)
2. (Australia) **Tony Roche (champion)**
3. (Australia) John Newcombe (first round)
4. (Australia) Ken Rosewall (second round)
5. (United States) Cliff Richey (first round)
6. (Australia) Roy Emerson (semifinals)
7. (United States) Arthur Ashe (quarterfinals)
8. (Spain) Andrés Gimeno (second round)

== Draw ==
=== Key ===
- Q = Qualifier
- WC = Wild card
- LL = Lucky loser
- Alt = Alternate
- SE = Special exempt
- PR = Protected ranking
- ITF = ITF entry
- JE = Junior exempt
- w/o = Walkover
- r = Retired
- d = Defaulted
- SR = Special ranking

=== Finals ===
Semifinals
2	**(Australia) Tony Roche**	2	**6**	**6**	**6**
6	(Australia) Roy Emerson	**6**	1	4	3
(South Africa) Cliff Drysdale	3	0	0
1	**(Australia) Rod Laver**	**6**	**6**	**6**

Final
2	**(Australia) Tony Roche**	3	**6**	**6**	**6**
1	(Australia) Rod Laver	**6**	4	2	2

=== Top half ===
Second round
2	**(Australia) T Roche**	**6**	**6**
(United States) D Ralston	4	1
**(Australia) F Stolle**	**6**	**7**
(Chile) P Cornejo	2	6
7	**(United States) A Ashe**	**6**	**6**
(France) P Barthès	4	2
**(United Arab Republic) I El Shafei**	1	**6**	**7**
(Netherlands) T Okker	**6**	4	5

Quarterfinals
2	**(Australia) T Roche**	**7**	6	**6**
(Australia) F Stolle	6	**7**	1
7	**(United States) A Ashe**	**6**	**6**
(United Arab Republic) I El Shafei	3	4

Semifinals
2	**(Australia) T Roche**	**6**	**6**
7	(United States) A Ashe	1	4
Semifinals
2	(Chile) Jaime Fillol	3	2	**6**	**6**
6	**(Australia) R Emerson**	**6**	**6**	3

=== Bottom half ===
Second round
**(Czechoslovakia) J Kodeš**	**6**	**6**
(United Kingdom) G Stilwell	4	1
**(United States) M Riessen**	2	**6**	**6**
5	(United States) C Richey	**6**	4	3
**(South Africa) C Drysdale**	**6**	5	**7**
(Kingdom of Yugoslavia) Ž Franulović	2	**7**	6
4	**(Australia) K Rosewall**	**6**	**6**
(United Kingdom) R Taylor	2	4

Quarterfinals
**(Czechoslovakia) J Kodeš**	**7**	**6**
(United States) M Riessen	5	4
**(South Africa) C Drysdale**	**6**	**7**
4	(Australia) K Rosewall	4	6

Semifinals
(Czechoslovakia) J Kodeš	**7**	3	4
**(South Africa) C Drysdale**	6	**6**	**6**
Semifinals
(Australia) R Ruffels	1	2	0
1	**(Australia) R Laver**	**6**	**6**
