= Rockdale Town Hall =

Building in Sydney, Australia

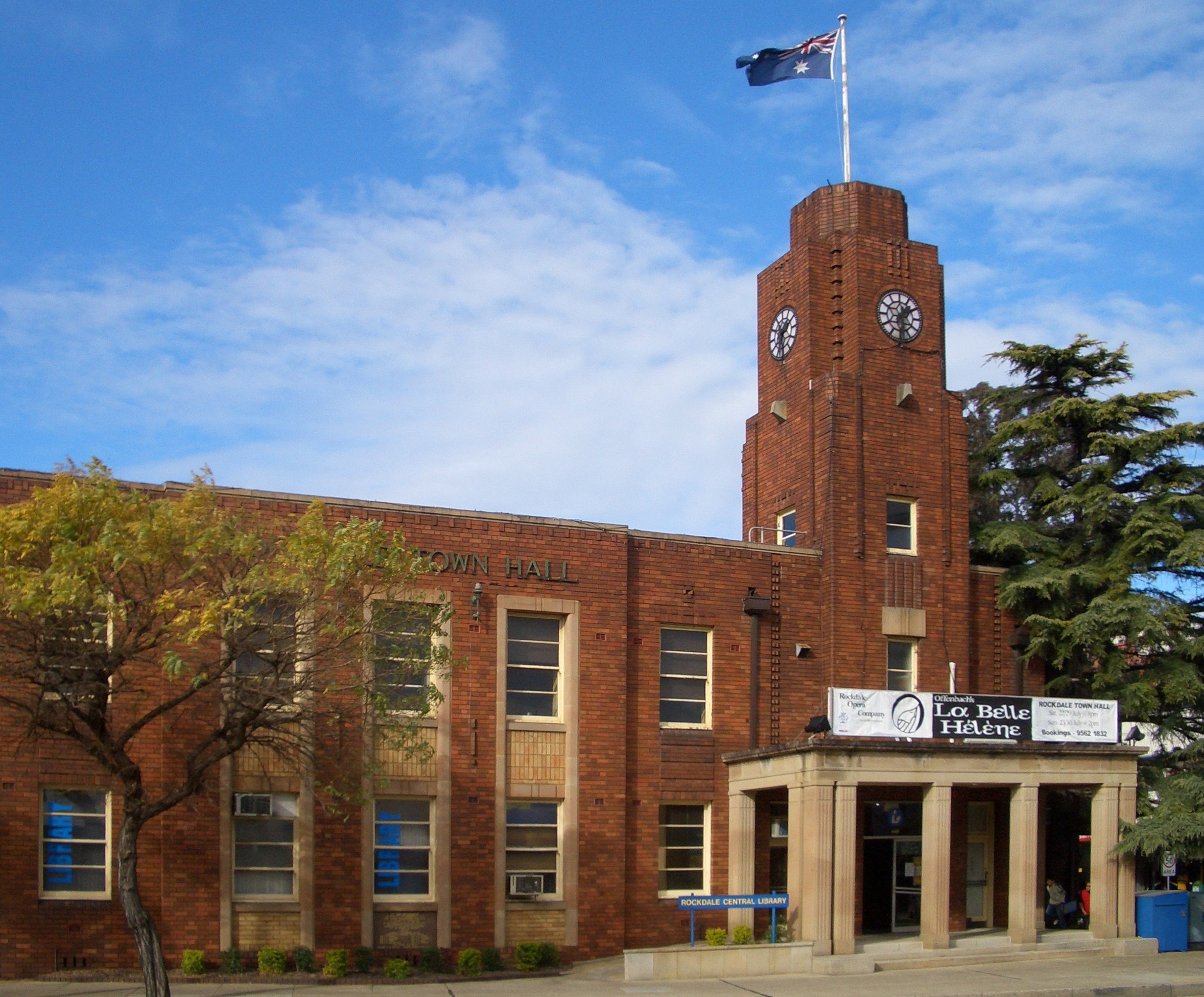
- The portico and tower of the town hall as seen from the Princes Highway

- Location within Sydney

General information
- Location: Princes Highway, Rockdale, New South Wales, Australia
- Coordinates: 33°57′12″S 151°08′24″E
- Completed: 1940
- Opened: 12 October 1940 by The Rt Hon. The Lord Wakehurst KCMG

Design and construction
- Architect: Douglas Gardiner

The Rockdale Town Hall is a civic building located on the corner of the Princes Highway and Bryant Street in Rockdale, a suburb of Sydney, New South Wales, Australia.

== History ==
Rockdale Town Hall was opened by The Rt Hon. The Lord Wakehurst KCMG, Governor of New South Wales, on 12 October 1940. The building was designed by then-local architect Douglas Gardiner, who became a Melbourne-based partner of Bates Smart & McCutcheon after World War II.

Built at a cost of A£20,000, the council chamber was at the time of construction 49 by 28 feet (14.9 m × 8.5 m) and the auditorium was 85 by 56 feet (26 m × 17 m). It is built of face brick detailed with stone at copings and around window architraves. The building entrance is marked by a stone portico and brick tower. The hall's interiors have elaborate art deco style plaster details to it walls and ceiling. The building is listed on local government heritage register within the New South Wales Heritage Database as "a fine representative example of a late inter-war stripped classical building with functionalist influences".

== See also ==
- List of town halls in Sydney
- Architecture of Sydney
