= 1969 U.S. Pro Tennis Championships =

- Date: July 9–15
- Edition: 42nd
- Category: NTL / WCT
- Draw: 32S / 16D
- Prize money: $33,000
- Surface: Hard / outdoor (Uniturf)
- Location: Chestnut Hill, Massachusetts, United States
- Venue: Longwood Cricket Club

Champions

Singles
- (Australia) Rod Laver

Doubles
- (United States) Pancho Gonzales / (Australia) Rod Laver
← 1968 ·	U.S. Pro Tennis Championships	· 1970 →

The 1969 U.S. Pro Tennis Championships was a men's professional tennis tournament played on outdoor hard courts at the Longwood Cricket Club in Chestnut Hill, Massachusetts in the United States. The existing grass courts at Longwood were replaced for the tournament with a slower and higher bouncing green synthetic hardcourt (Uniturf)). It was the 42nd edition of the tournament, the second edition of the Open Era, and was held from July 9 through July 15, 1969. First-seeded Rod Laver won the singles title, his fourth consecutive title at the event and fifth in total, and earned $8,000 first-prize money.

== Finals ==
=== Singles ===
(Australia) Rod Laver defeated (Australia) John Newcombe 7–5, 6–2, 4–6, 6–1

=== Doubles ===
(United States) Pancho Gonzales / (Australia) Rod Laver defeated (Australia) John Newcombe / (Australia) Tony Roche 6–4, 5–7, 6–4

== See also ==
- Laver–Rosewall rivalry
