= Wilsons Farm House =

- Location within New South Wales Location within Australia
- 33.9526°S 151.1484°E
- Location: 310 West Botany Street, Rockdale, Bayside Council, New South Wales, Australia

History
- Built: 1855–1856

Site notes
- Owner: Rockdale City Council

New South Wales Heritage Register
- Official name: Wilsons Farm House
- Type: state heritage (built)
- Designated: 2 April 1999
- Reference no.: 487
- Type: Homestead building
- Category: Residential buildings (private)
- Builders: James Wilson

Wilsons Farm House is a heritage-listed former residence at 310 West Botany Street, Rockdale, Bayside Council, New South Wales, Australia. It was built from 1855 to 1856 by James Wilson. The property is owned by Bayside Council. It was added to the New South Wales State Heritage Register on 2 April 1999.

== History ==
For many years in the nineteenth century the suburb of Rockdale and the locality where Wilson's Cottage is located had other names - Frog's Hollow, Muddy Creek, or White Gum Flat.

Both the current name and its historical predecessors describe aspects of the geography of the area: Rockdale, a name that was adopted officially in 1878, describes the rock outcrops around Cameron Street and below the ridge of Forest Road. Wilson's Cottage is within the catchment of Muddy Creek, which with Spring Creek drains the waters of the district into the Cooks River.

The area of Wilson's Cottage was sold in a government land sale of the early 1850s, with the grantee being Alexander William Riley who purchased 60 acres in April 1853. Riley (1818-1870) was one of the beneficiaries of the estate of Edward Riley, and an officer in the British army (80th Regiment of Foot) at the time of his death in 1870.

Riley's historical association with the grant is marginal, for on 10 October 1853 the grant was transferred to William Manning Clarke, and on the following day Clarke conveyed the grant to John Murphy for 180 pounds.

The 60 acres originally granted to Riley on 25 April 1853 was acquired on 11 October 1853 by John Murphy, a draftsman and landholder (painter and glazier: Davies, 2016, 15) of Waverley, who named the whole estate KilIarney (presumably after his place of birth). The architect was probably Thomas Bird, for the house was described as having been erected under the supervision of an architect, and Bird was referred to in the sale notice as having laid out the survey of the subdivision. Murphy built Killarney House on the western portion which he sold on 20 July 1854 to Thomas Henry Hayes, a livery stablekeeper of Sydney. This portion is now west of West Botany Street.

In 1855 Murphy sold the portion east of West Botany Street containing 18 acres 20 perches, to James Wilson, a farmer of Cooks River. The deed contained a covenant to keep the premises safe and undefaced which indicates there was possibly a building on the land at that time. The property then remained in the hands of the Wilson family for 103 years. It appears that the family cultivated their land but the type and extent of crops is unknown.

James Wilson was formerly overseer to Colonel Johnson of "Annandale" on land previously owned by John Bowmer.

The exact date of construction of the cottage is not known but it would appear to have been between c. 1853 and c. 1860.

James Wilson, a sawyer by trade, arrived in Australia on 20 May 1850 aboard the Thetis with his wife, Isabella (née Macdonald), and seven of his eight children. These were Isabella aged 19, John 17, Janet 13, Helen 12, Francis 10, James 6, and Mary Anne aged 4.

His eldest son, David, had immigrated the previous year aboard the Thomas Arbuthnot with his wife, also an Isabella (née Muril), and two stepsons, Robert aged 7 and John 5. David, in 1850, worked as a storekeeper in Sydney but by 1854 he was working as a labourer at Cooks River.

In 1863 James Wilson sold 9 acres 21 perches of land along the eastern side of his property to John Bowmer, a gardener who had arrived aboard the Irene on 16 October 1852.

After James Wilson died on 20. April 1869, the estate passed to his wife who, on 23 April 1884 sold the house and land to their son, David George Wilson. It appears from records that David Wilson continued market gardening and lived there with his family.

When David died on 31 January 1905, the property passed to his wife, Sarah Ann (née Brown), the executor being David George Wilson Jnr. David Jnr was not a gardener but a clerk living at Dulwich Hill and on 28 January 1917 Sarah Wilson leased about 3 acres with a house on what was then known as Wilson's paddock to Chinese market gardeners, Fong Hoy and Fong Loy, trading as Sam Lee for 12 shillings per week.

When Sarah Wilson died on 10 February 1923, she left the property to four of her children, Lily Maud Loveday (née Wilson), Elsie Mabel Thompson (née Wilson), David George Wilson and Leslie James Wilson.

On 30 November 1929, nine allotments along the northern boundary of the estate were sold at auction, while the southern portion comprising the market garden was retained by Lily Maud Loveday.

The 1929 auction notice suggests Lots 1 to 9 are vacant but a Water Board survey dated September of the same year (two months before the auction) shows clearly that all lots except Lots 1 and 7 are built on. It is possible that the survey was added to at a later date, a practice common with these plans. This same survey shows no additions or outbuildings to the cottage while the subdivision plan shows an addition to the east. Site evidence suggests that, at about this time, the lath and plaster ceilings were replaced with timber boarding.

From May 1930 to April 1945 the land was leased by Chinese gardeners, Kim Fun and Lee Yee, and from April 1945 to March 1952 by Fun Low, Chune Hor and Ah Look. The cottage probably provided accommodation for the Chinese workers. An early publication relates a police raid on the premises during which West Botany Street gardener Ah Quay was charged with being the keeper of a common gaming house. Also before the Court were Messrs. Ah Sing, Lee Choy, Wing Lee, Lee Sup, Ah Lee, Wong Foo, Ah Chew, Ah Chuck, Lee Fun and Go Hop.

A 1951 aerial photograph shows the intensity of the market garden activity and at least two shed structures to the south with what appears to be a small service compound between them and the cottage. A large tree can be seen to the east of the cottage with a small addition joining it on this side

When the Cumberland County Council imposed restrictions on the development of large tracts of land, the market gardens in West Botany Street were designated as open space. On 10 June 1952 the land passed to Lily Maud Upcroft and, when the garden lease expired in 1958, the property passed to the Council of the Municipality of Rockdale. The deed is marked "No further dealings to be registered." It is possible that about 1958, the cottage ceased to be used as a residence.

Prior to about 1972 Rockdale Council continued the historical land use of market gardening. It seems cessation of that use and conversion to recreational space was undertaken about that time, in 1971, when Rockdale Park opposite was developed from playing fields into a botanic garden. The removal of the playing fields upset local groups such as the St. George Cricket Association. and a petition of protest was generated. About this time Council was running out of places to dispose of municipal rubbish. It was raised in November 1971 by Mayor Rathbone that the market garden should be considered as a short term measure. About 1972 the weekly tenancy of the Chinese market gardeners, Fun Low, Chune Hor and Ah Look, was terminated. An aerial photo of 1977 shows the site cleared of garden beds, levelled and in use for sports. The Rockdale Women's Netball Complex opened officially on 2 April 1978.

The cottage has been used by Rockdale City Council as storage rooms for salvaged interior fixtures and plant nursery equipment, in a public park.

Wilson's Cottage has been empty for many years and is in a very poor and vulnerable condition. The future of this diminutive 19th century cottage will only be made possible if its conservation and restoration is undertaken and the building is given a viable future use.

== Description ==
Wilson's Farmhouse sits in the north-west corner of the Women's Sports Field, approximately 10m from a dark brick 1970s two-storey house on the neighbouring site to its north. It is now located in a shallow hollow created by filling the former market garden area to create netball courts and their associated car parking area.

The site contains few elements relating to its early development. The only remaining site element relating to the history of Wilson's Farmhouse is one Peruvian peppercorn tree (Schinus molle) to the north-west of the cottage.

The open space formed by the netball courts to the south of the cottage occupies most of the land retained by James Wilson after his 1863 sale to John Bowmer. It also includes the land on the other side of Muddy Creek sold to John Bowmer. A suburban housing subdivision now occupies the northern boundary along Bryant Street. The rest of Wilson's land is still open space.

The farmhouse is one of the earliest surviving houses in Rockdale from a period when the place was undeveloped and the land was rural. It is associated with early market gardening in the area, has a long association with the Wilson family who farmed the land, which was originally 18 acres and 20 perches. The property is also associated with Chinese market gardeners who leased the land from 1930 to 1952.

An earth berm that raises the level of the ground adjacent to the netball courts runs parallel to the cottage a couple of metres from its southern elevation. This change in ground level has covered over any physical evidence of the former compound of outbuildings to the south and left the cottage in a low-lying depression. The original relationship of the cottage to the street has also been altered by this change in level.

Other earthworks in the immediate vicinity have removed or covered evidence of the rear additions to the cottage and the large tree planted at the rear. A pine tree and recent plantings of small native trees partially screen the building from West Botany Street, replacing the low hedge visible in Eardley's sketch. The only vegetation in the immediate vicinity of the cottage is closely mown grass.

High-tension power lines run east–west immediately adjacent to the cottage. These lines, together with the earth berm form a subtle visual boundary between the farmhouse and its remaining original open space.

Car access to the property is via the Kerb crossing used for the netball courts. This is in approximately the same position as the sole vehicular entry to the market gardens visible in the 1951 aerial photograph. The area to the south of the cottage, previously occupied by a group of outbuildings, had been filled and raised and is now used for car parking during sporting activities.

House

Wilsons Farm House is a single-storey, four-room, gable-roofed cottage. Externally, the cottage is constructed of roughly sparrow picked sandstone with dressed sandstone window sills. Two simple gable walls, with'S' wall ties, form the north and south elevations. The north wall incorporates the only chimney. The east elevation has two windows, .one each side of a centre door. Three crude sandstone steps lead down from the door. On the west elevation to West Botany Street, two windows flank an off-centre door, reflecting those on the east elevation and are protected by a hipped verandah.

The timber verandah structure and vertical timber board screen are of recent construction but appear to roughly follow an earlier structure. A rendered rough stone base to the verandah, although roughly repaired, retains vestiges of an earlier render finish which was marked out to resemble stone flags. The whole roof is sheeted with corrugated galvanised iron and most of it appears to be early.

Internally, the almost square plan is divided into four rooms with no internal corridor. The two northern rooms, Rooms 1 and 2, larger than the two southern rooms, each contain a fireplace and a door to the exterior. Room 2 contains evidence of a coat rack on the south wall, and the remains of early shelving either side of the fireplace. All walls are lime-plastered masonry.

Most of the grooved 150 mm timber boarded ceilings have been eaten by termites. A nailing pattern in the ceiling joists suggests a previous ceiling of lathe and plaster. The four rooms have ceiling patches of various materials. The floors are concrete throughout.

Portions of a timber scotia cornice survive in Room 1. There is no evidence of a skirting nor window or door architraves in any room. An early doublehung, six-pane window and its frame survive in situ in Room 1. On the floor of Room 4 lie the remains of an early window and its frame. Other window joinery is almost entirely missing. All door frames appear to be original but none of the door leaves survive.

No evidence could be found of the rear additions.

== Heritage listing ==
Wilsons Farm House is the last surviving example of the modest pioneer homes built along the banks of Muddy Creek. It demonstrates the early rural and more recent market garden development of Rockdale. It is an extant example of a simple nineteenth-century colonial farmhouse. It is associated with an early small holding settler family, the Wilsons.

Wilsons Farm House was listed on the New South Wales State Heritage Register on 2 April 1999.
