= Rockdale, New South Wales =

Suburb of Sydney, Australia

Rockdale
- Suburb
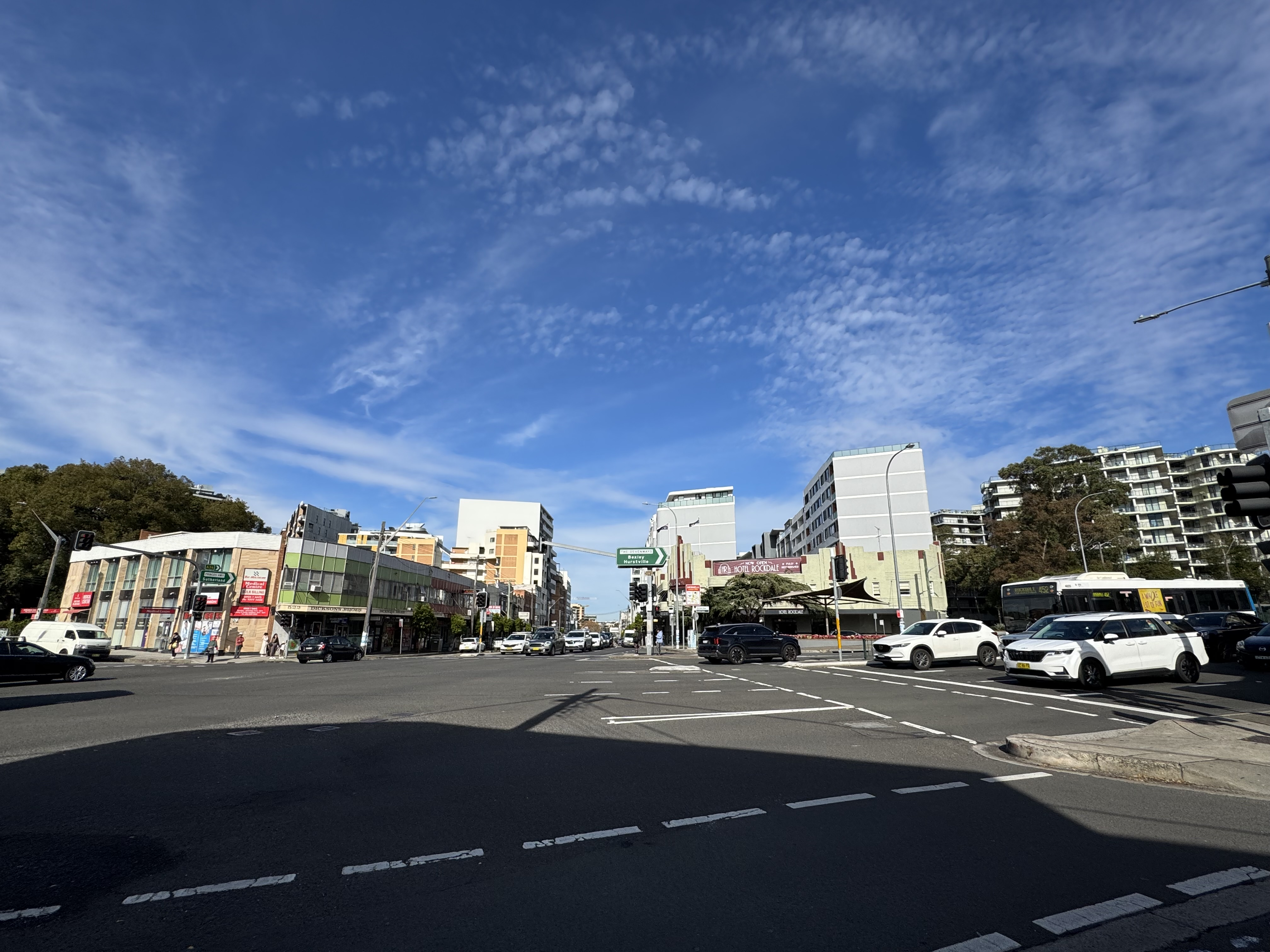
- Intersection of Princes Highway, The Seven Ways, and Bay Street

- Interactive map of Rockdale
- Country: Australia
- State: New South Wales
- City: Sydney
- LGA: Bayside Council
- Location: 13 km (8.1 mi) south of Sydney CBD
- Established: 1887

Government
  - State electorate: Rockdale
  - Federal division: Barton

Area
  - Total: 2.4 km^{2} (0.93 sq mi)
- Elevation: 20 m (66 ft)

Population
  - Total: 15,475 (2021 census)
  - Density: 6,450/km^{2} (16,700/sq mi)
- Postcode: 2216
Suburbs around Rockdale
Arncliffe	Banksia	Kyeemagh
Bexley	Rockdale	Brighton-Le-Sands
Bexley	Kogarah	Monterey

Rockdale is a suburb in southern Sydney, in the state of New South Wales, Australia. Rockdale is located 13 kilometres south of the Sydney central business district and is part of the St George area. Rockdale is one of the administrative centres for the local government area of the Bayside Council. Since 1985, Rockdale has been a twinned city with Bitola, in the Republic of Macedonia.

== History ==
Rockdale was known by Europeans as Frog Hollow, then White Gum Flat and later as West Botany. The name Rockdale was suggested in 1878 by the first postmistress, Mary Ann Geeves. The name for the district gained more credence when the local railway station on the new Illawarra rail line, opened on 15 October 1884, was also given the name Rockdale. The West Botany Municipality, declared on 13 January 1871 with two wards, West Botany and Arncliffe, was renamed "The Municipality of Rockdale" on 17 May 1888.

A council chambers for the West Botany Municipality was built in 1872 on Rocky Point Road, Arncliffe and was used until 1888 when a new building was erected on the site of the present Rockdale Town Hall, which was then demolished and rebuilt in 1940.

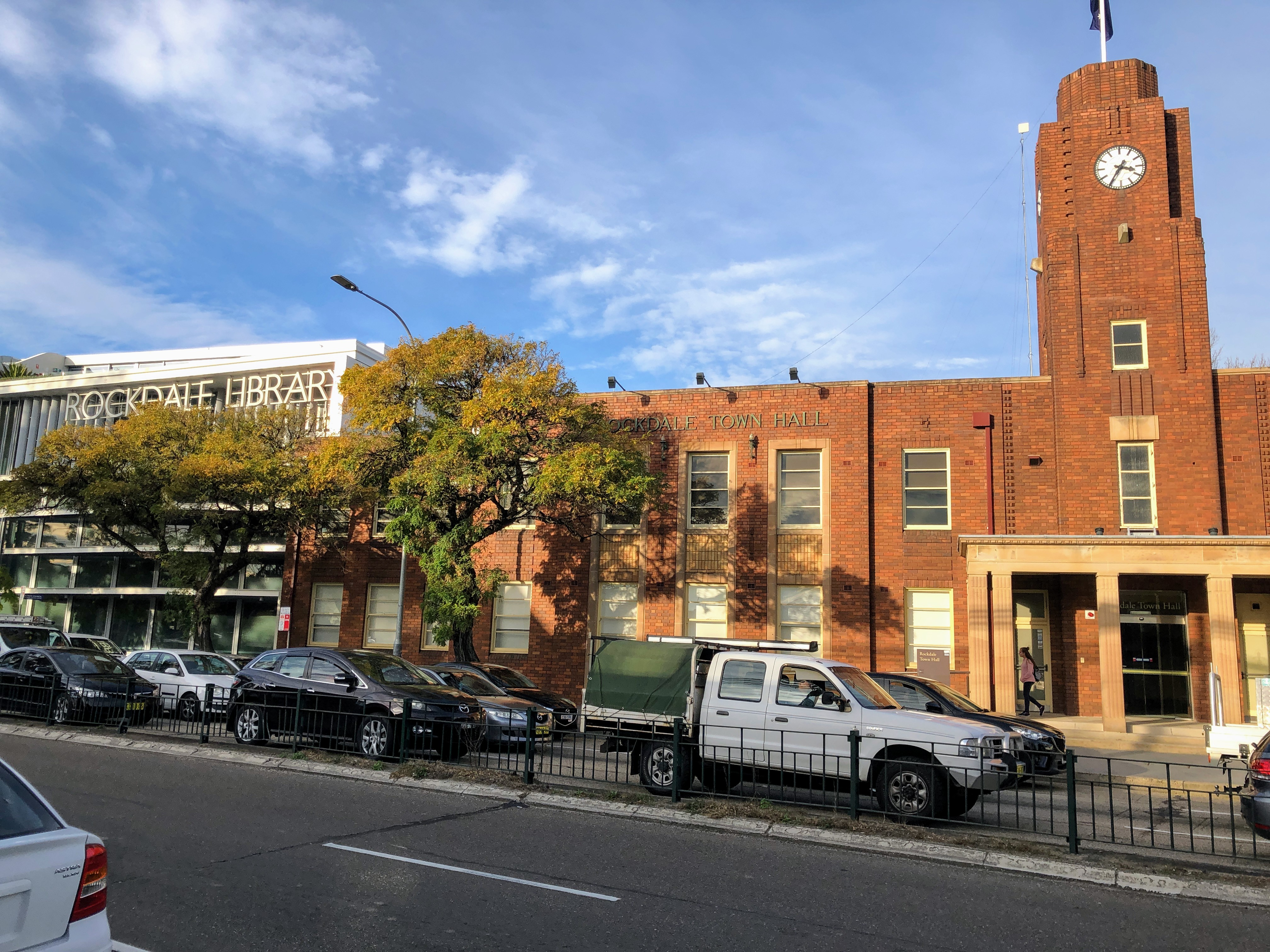
Rockdale Town Hall and Library

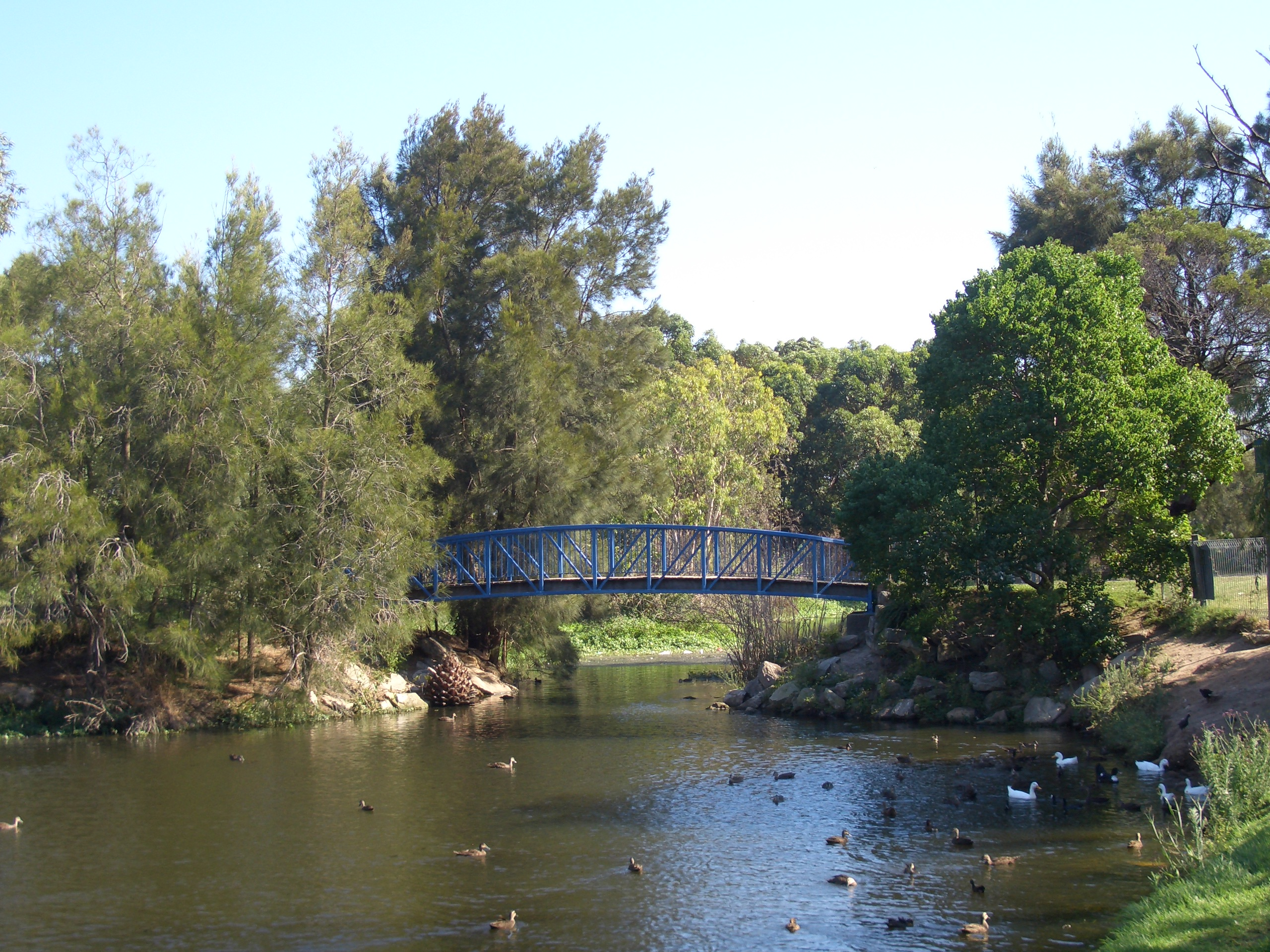
Rockdale Bicentennial Park opened in 1988

There was a suggestion that the area become the Municipality of Scarborough but the name Rockdale was suggested by pioneer Mary Ann Geeves, postmistress and tollgate keeper and was officially adopted in 1887. Her husband, Yeoman Geeves, was a ganger on the construction of Rocky Point Road and the demolition of Cobbler's Hill (later called Arncliffe Hill). The Geeves family, including eldest son Frederick lived on the corner of today's Princes Highway and Tramway Arcade. Their general store adjoined the cottage and operated the first post office between Arncliffe and Kogarah in 1882. Residential development began with the opening of the railway in 1884. Perhaps the most significant property developer during the 1880s was Frederick Jamison Gibbes, a Member of Parliament, who is commemorated by Gibbes Street in Banksia. Until 1949, an electric tramway operated between Rockdale Station down Bay Street to Brighton-Le-Sands. In 1948, Rockdale and Bexley councils amalgamated as Rockdale Municipal Council. The City of Rockdale was declared in 1995 and it was merged with City of Botany Bay in 2016 to become Bayside Council.

== Heritage listings ==
Rockdale has a number of heritage-listed sites, including:

- Illawarra railway: Rockdale railway station
- 18 Lydham Avenue: Lydham Hall
- Occupation Road: Kyeemagh Market Gardens
- 310 West Botany Street: Wilsons Farm House

== Commercial areas ==
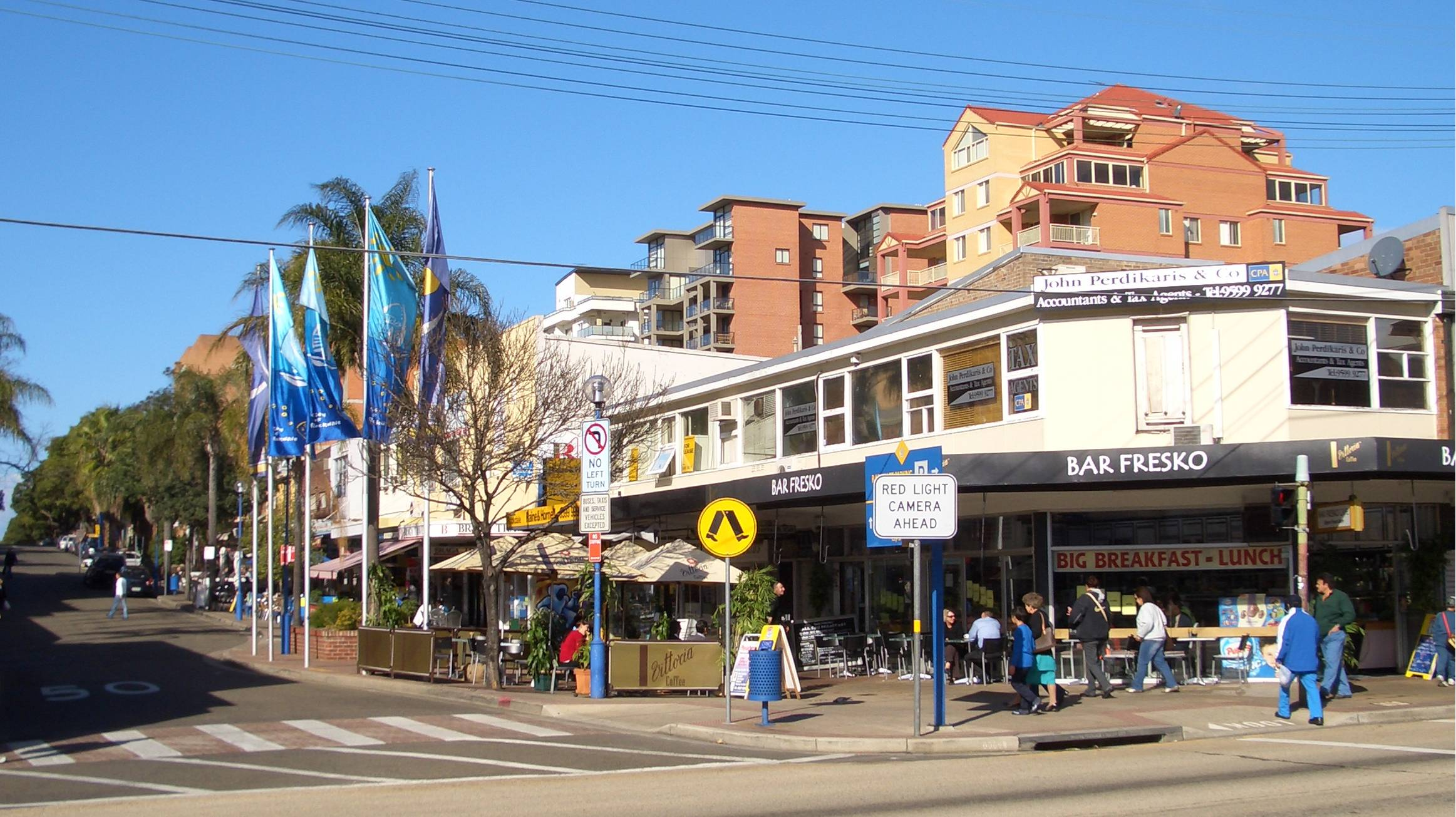
Café Culture, King Street

Rockdale has a mixture of residential, commercial and light industrial areas. The main shopping strip runs along the Princes Highway, on the eastern side of Rockdale railway station. The commercial centre spreads out into surrounding streets and on the western side of the railway line. King Street has developed into a cosy strip of cafes and grocery shops. Commercial developments run along the length of the parts of Bay Street and West Botany Street. The light industrial areas are located around West Botany Street.

Rockdale Plaza is shopping centre located on Princes Highway in the southern part of the suburb.

Rockdale Town Hall and the St George Tavern are examples of some of the Art Deco architecture in the area. The Town Hall was built in 1940 to a design by local resident and architect Douglas Gardiner.

== Demographics ==
According to the 2021 census, there were 15,475 people usually resident in Rockdale. 33.5% of people were born in Australia. The next most common countries of birth were Nepal (15.8%), China (6.5%), North Macedonia (3.5%), Bangladesh (3.4%), and Philippines (3.2%). 28% of people spoke only English at home. Other languages spoken at home included Nepali (16.1%), Mandarin (5.5%), Macedonian (5.2%), Arabic (4.6%), and Cantonese (4.1%). The most common responses for religious affiliation were No Religion (21.0%), Hinduism (18.2%), Catholic (16.4%), Islam (10.6%) and Eastern Orthodox (9.9%).

== Transport ==
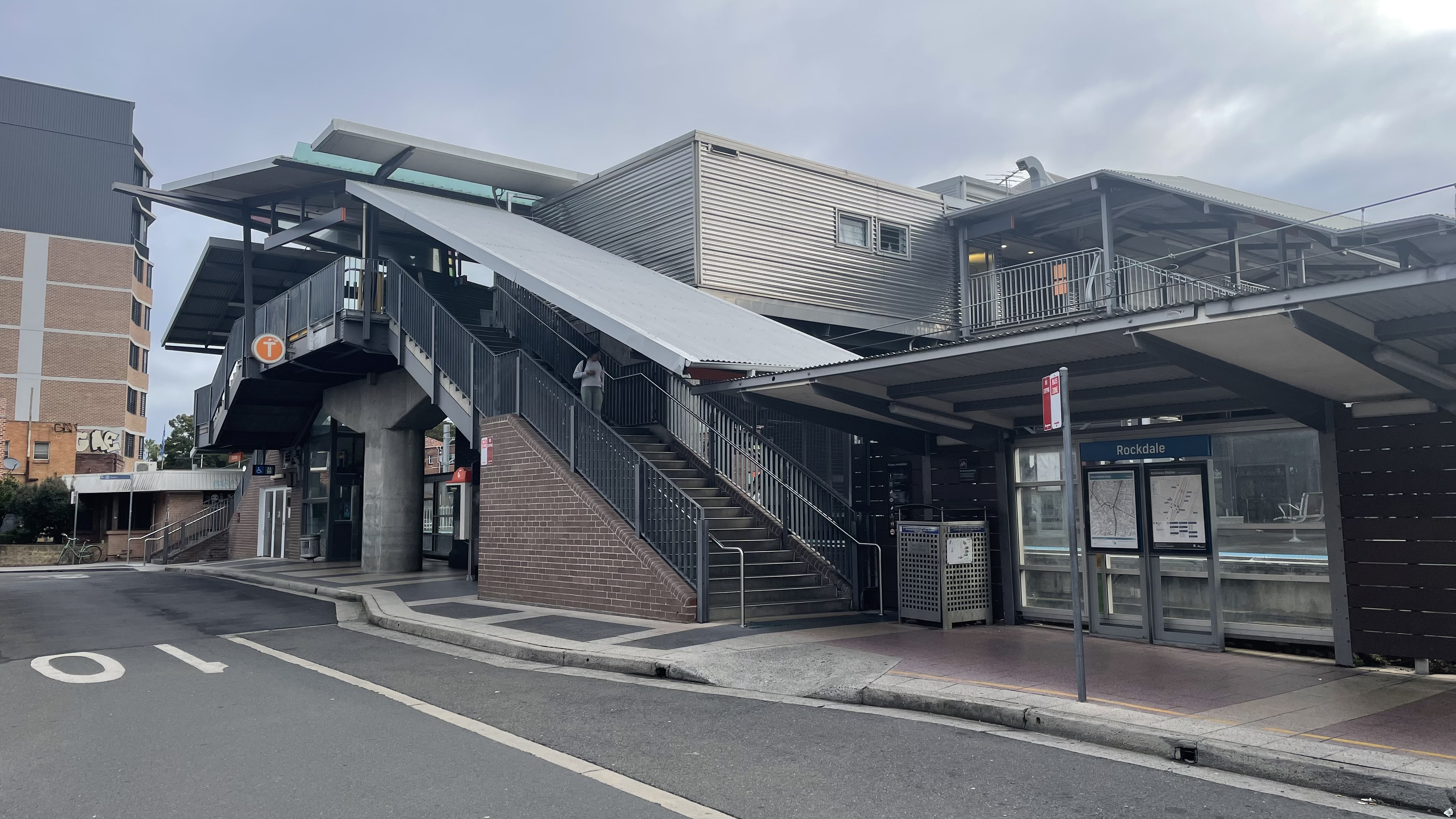
Rockdale railway station

The Princes Highway is the main road through Rockdale. West Botany Street, to the east, runs parallel to Princes Highway. Bay Street links Rockdale to General Holmes Drive at Brighton-le-Sands. Rockdale railway station is on the Illawarra line of the Sydney Trains network. Rockdale is a major bus interchange for Transit Systems buses, which operates services to Westfield Miranda, Brighton-Le-Sands, Westfield Burwood and Mascot station and U-Go Mobility which operates to Hurstville. Rockdale is approximately a 20-minute commute to the CBD via public transport and approximately a 25-minute commute to the CBD by driving.

=== Rockdale to Brighton-Le-Sands tram line ===
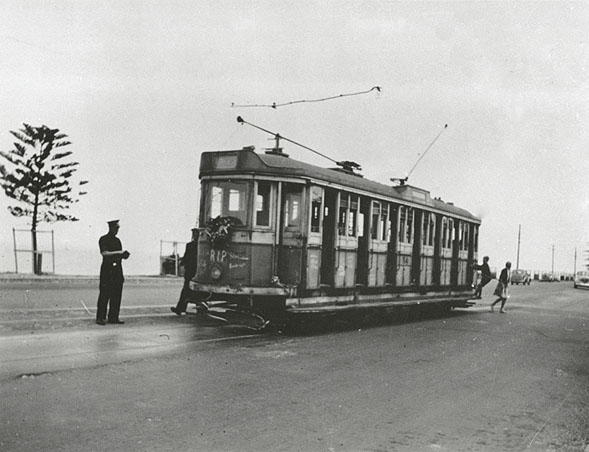
Last run to Rockdale from Brighton-Le-Sands

This line opened as a private steam tramway in 1885. It was electrified in 1900, and moved into government ownership in 1914. The line connected with the trains at Rockdale station, then passed down Bay Street to Brighton-Le-Sands. The line was single track throughout, with a passing loop at each end. The line closed in 1949 and was replaced by a bus service. A small depot in Rockdale maintained the cars.

Rockdale is also serviced by St George Community Transport, a HACC funded transport serviced for the frail aged, people with disability and their carers.
