= Kyeemagh Market Gardens =

- Location within New South Wales Location within Australia
- 33.9490°S 151.1583°E
- Location: Occupation Road, Kyeemagh, Bayside Council, New South Wales, Australia

History
- Built: 1892–

Site notes
- Architect: N/A
- Owner: Department of Planning and Infrastructure

New South Wales Heritage Register
- Official name: Kyeemagh Market Gardens; Occupation Road Market Gardens; Chinese Market Gardens; Rockdale Market Gardens
- Type: state heritage (landscape)
- Designated: 2 April 1999
- Reference no.: 1393
- Type: Market Garden
- Category: Farming and Grazing
- Builders: N/A

The Kyeemagh Market Gardens are heritage-listed market gardens at Occupation Road, Kyeemagh, Bayside Council, New South Wales, Australia. It was established from 1892. It is also known as Occupation Road Market Gardens, Chinese Market Gardens and Rockdale Market Gardens. It was added to the New South Wales State Heritage Register on 2 April 1999.

== History ==
The area east of Tabrett Street is believed to have been occupied by market gardeners since 1892-3, whilst other areas were still vacant. In later years, these areas were occupied by Italian and Maltese gardeners. The site has been leased by Chinese Market gardeners since its resumption for open space c. 1980s.

== Description ==
The site comprises 8 hectares (20 acres) of land, bounded by the Cooks River, Occupation Road and Bestic Street, divided into four x 5 acre leasehold gardens. The site also contains seven buildings, some of which were originally dwellings, but which are now used for living, storage and packing.

Lot 4: contains a simply detailed weatherboard cottage with gabled corrugated iron roof (new). To the sides and rear, the building is clad in sheet metal, with the original split timber construction visible underneath. The verandah is timber floored. Paired windows flank the central, panelled door. Windows are timber, sashed, six pane and double hung. Joinery appears original. There is a sandstock brick skillion addition and separate recent, corrugated iron shed to the rear.

Between Lot 4 and 3: Contains a series of corrugated iron sheds in very poor condition. Some have almost completely collapsed.

Lot 3: contains a simple weatherboard cottage, similar to that on Lot 4. The verandah ends are enclosed with sawn timber. Similar joinery and detailing to Lot 4. There is a corrugated iron and timber skillion addition to one side. Both buildings appear to date from the late 19th Century.

Lot 2: contains a corrugated iron shed with gabled roof and skillion addition to the side. The age is difficult to ascertain from an initial inspection, as some of the corrugated iron has been replaced.

As at 26 November 1998, the site is still under production as a market garden and has some archaeological potential related to its continuing use as a market garden.

The Kyeemagh Market Gardens appear to be a largely intact site and include a number of extant structures which appear to be little altered since their erection.

== Heritage listing ==
The Kyeemagh Market Gardens are of high significance for their association with the Chinese community and their demonstration of a continuing pattern of land use from the late nineteenth century to the present. Market gardens such as these were once typical in the Rockdale Municipality but are now becoming increasingly rare.

Kyeemagh Market Gardens was listed on the New South Wales State Heritage Register on 2 April 1999 having satisfied the following criteria.

The place is important in demonstrating the course, or pattern, of cultural or natural history in New South Wales.

The Kyeemagh Market Gardens are of historical significance for their demonstration of a continuous pattern of land use since the late nineteenth century. They are also of significance for their association with the development of local industry and for their association with early Chinese and European immigration and the influence of ethnic communities on local industry.

The place is important in demonstrating aesthetic characteristics and/or a high degree of creative or technical achievement in New South Wales.

The Kyeemagh Market Gardens have aesthetic significance as a continually used market garden area which has survived the pressure of modern urban expandion. The weatherboard cottages on Lots 3 and 4 are excellent examples of Victorian period rustic vernacular architecture.

The place has a strong or special association with a particular community or cultural group in New South Wales for social, cultural or spiritual reasons.

The Kyeemagh Market Gardens are of high social significance for their association with early ethnic communities, especially the Chinese Community, and for the role they have played in helping to feed the local and regional population, particularly during the Inter-War, Depression and Post-War periods.

The place has potential to yield information that will contribute to an understanding of the cultural or natural history of New South Wales.

The Kyeemagh Market Gardens have some technical/research significance for demonstrating early market gardening practices, particularly through some of the extant structures on the site relating to previous uses.

The place possesses uncommon, rare or endangered aspects of the cultural or natural history of New South Wales.

Market gardens such as this are becoming increasingly rare and the Kyeemagh Market Gardens are of particular importance for their demonstration of a continuing pattern of usage from the late nineteenth century through to the present day.

The place is important in demonstrating the principal characteristics of a class of cultural or natural places/environments in New South Wales.

Regional
