= Douglas Gardiner =

Australian architect (1905–2001)

Douglas Gardiner – Architect
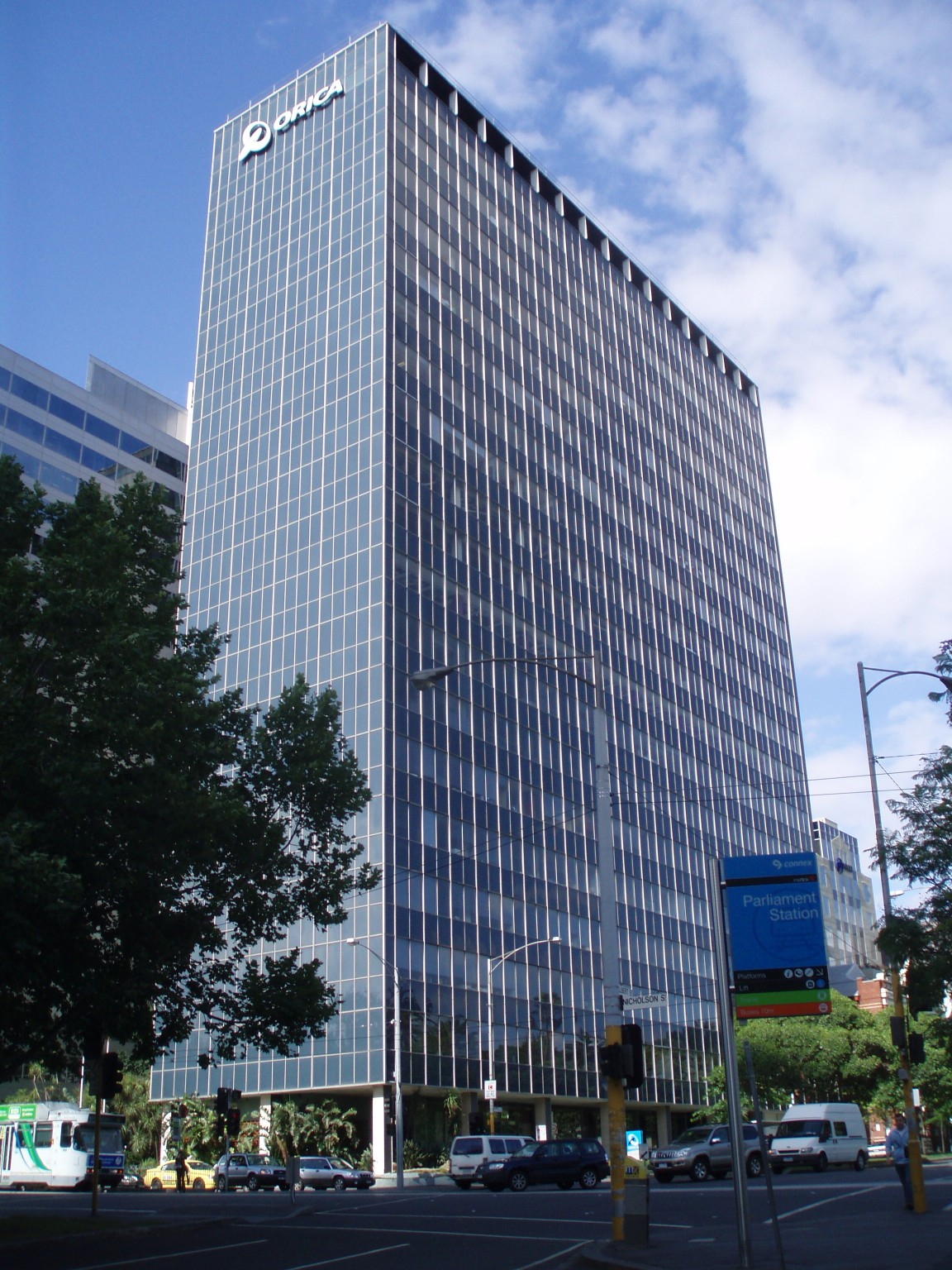
- Former ICI House, Melbourne; Detail and documentation by Douglas Gardiner
- Born: 26 February 1905; Sydney
- Died: 23 May 2001 (aged 96); Queensland
- Occupation: Architect

Douglas Babbington Gardiner (26 February 1905 – 23 May 2001) was an Australian architect active in the mid 20th century as a partner of Bates Smart & McCutcheon.

== Early life ==
Gardiner was born in Sydney and spent his early years living in Harrow Road, Bexley. His father, Edward John Gardiner, a long-serving Mayor of Rockdale, and mother Mary Estelle (née Beard) then built a new house c.1912–1916 at 18 Oakura Street. During this period, Gardiner attended Newington College. He was articled to Peddle, Thorp and Walker and graduated in architecture from Sydney Technical College.

== Architectural career ==
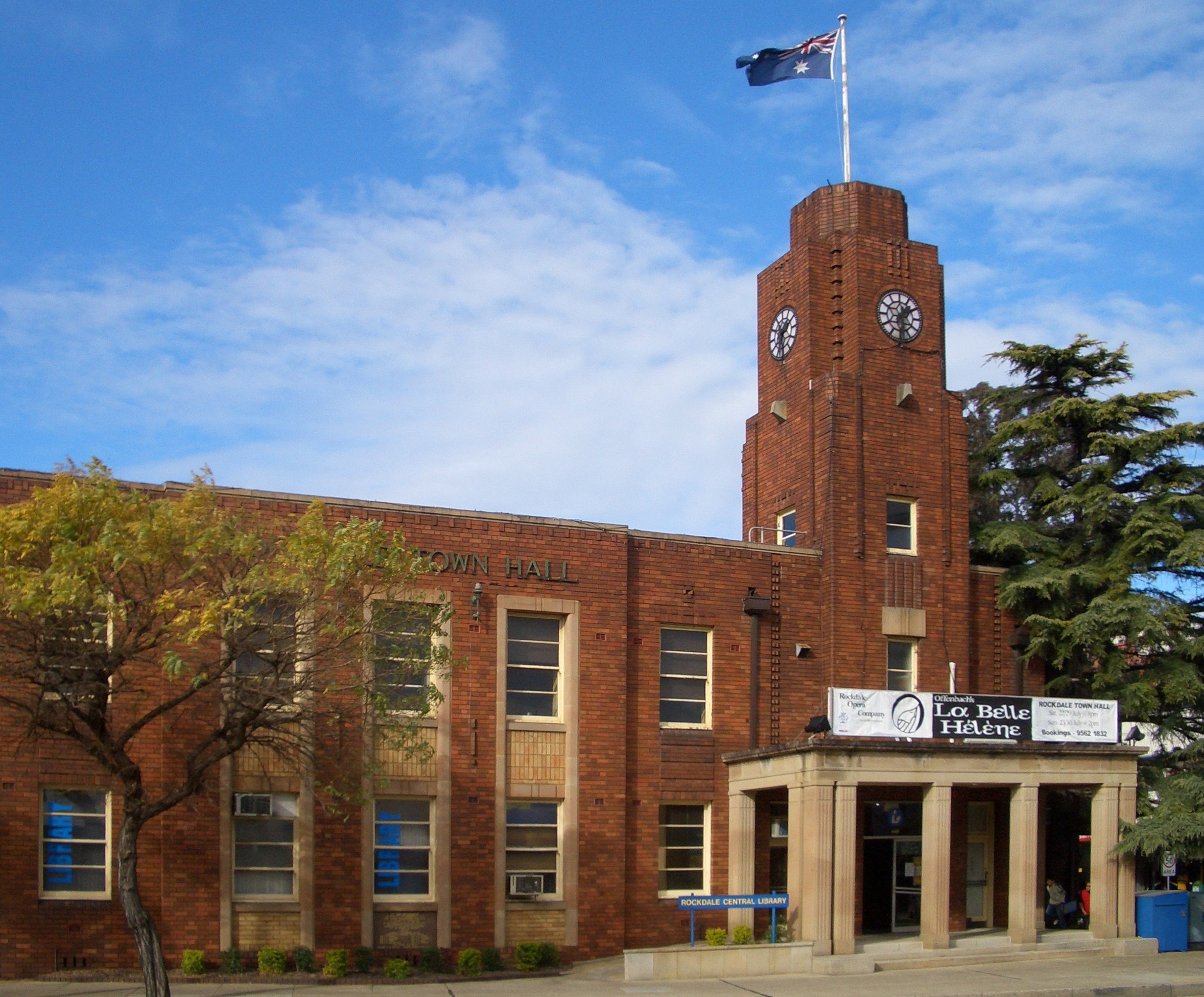
Rockdale Town Hall

In 1926, Gardiner travelled abroad and worked in New York City for York and Sawyer and later in London for Joseph Emberton. On his return to Sydney in 1929, he worked in the office of Emil Sodersten and then with Hennessy & Hennessy. In the 1930s he lived next door to his old family home at 16 Oakura Street, Rockdale, and worked for himself in private practice. In 1940, construction commenced on a new Rockdale Town Hall to his design. During World War II he served as an architect in the US Army Corps of Engineers in the south-west Pacific area and met Osborn McCutcheon. At war's end, Gardiner was appointed a partner at Bates Smrt & McCutcheon. His work within the firm included:

- MLC Limited Buildings in, Ballarat, Geelong, and Morwell in Victoria and Newcastle and Wollongong in NSW;
- Footscray, Myrtleford, Yarram and Western Port hospitals in Victoria;
- Tally Ho Boys Village;
- The Standard Motor Company Building;
- The Prudential Insurance Company Building (1960); and
- The H C Sleigh Ltd Building, cnr Queen Street and Bourke Street, Melbourne (1962).
