= 1970 U.S. Pro Tennis Championships =

- Date: August 3–9
- Edition: 43rd
- Category: Grand Prix (Class 1)
- Draw: 32S / 16D
- Prize money: $50,000
- Surface: Hard / outdoor
- Location: Chestnut Hill, Massachusetts, US
- Venue: Longwood Cricket Club

Champions

Singles
- (Australia) Tony Roche

Doubles
- (Australia) Roy Emerson / (Australia) Rod Laver
- U.S. Pro Tennis Championships

The 1970 U.S. Pro Tennis Championships was a men's tennis tournament played on outdoor hard courts at the Longwood Cricket Club in Chestnut Hill, Massachusetts, USA. It was classified as a Class 1 category tournament and was part of the 1970 Grand Prix circuit. It was the 43rd edition of the tournament and was held from August 3 through August 9, 1970. Fourth-seeded Tony Roche won the singles title and the accompanying $12,000 first prize money.

== Finals ==
=== Singles ===
(Australia) Tony Roche defeated (Australia) Rod Laver, 3–6, 6–4, 1–6, 6–2, 6–2.

=== Doubles ===
(Australia) Roy Emerson / (Australia) Rod Laver defeated (United Arab Republic) Ismail El Shafei / (Denmark) Torben Ulrich, 6–1, 7–6.
