= Ken Rosewall =

Australian tennis player (born 1934)

Ken Rosewall AM MBE
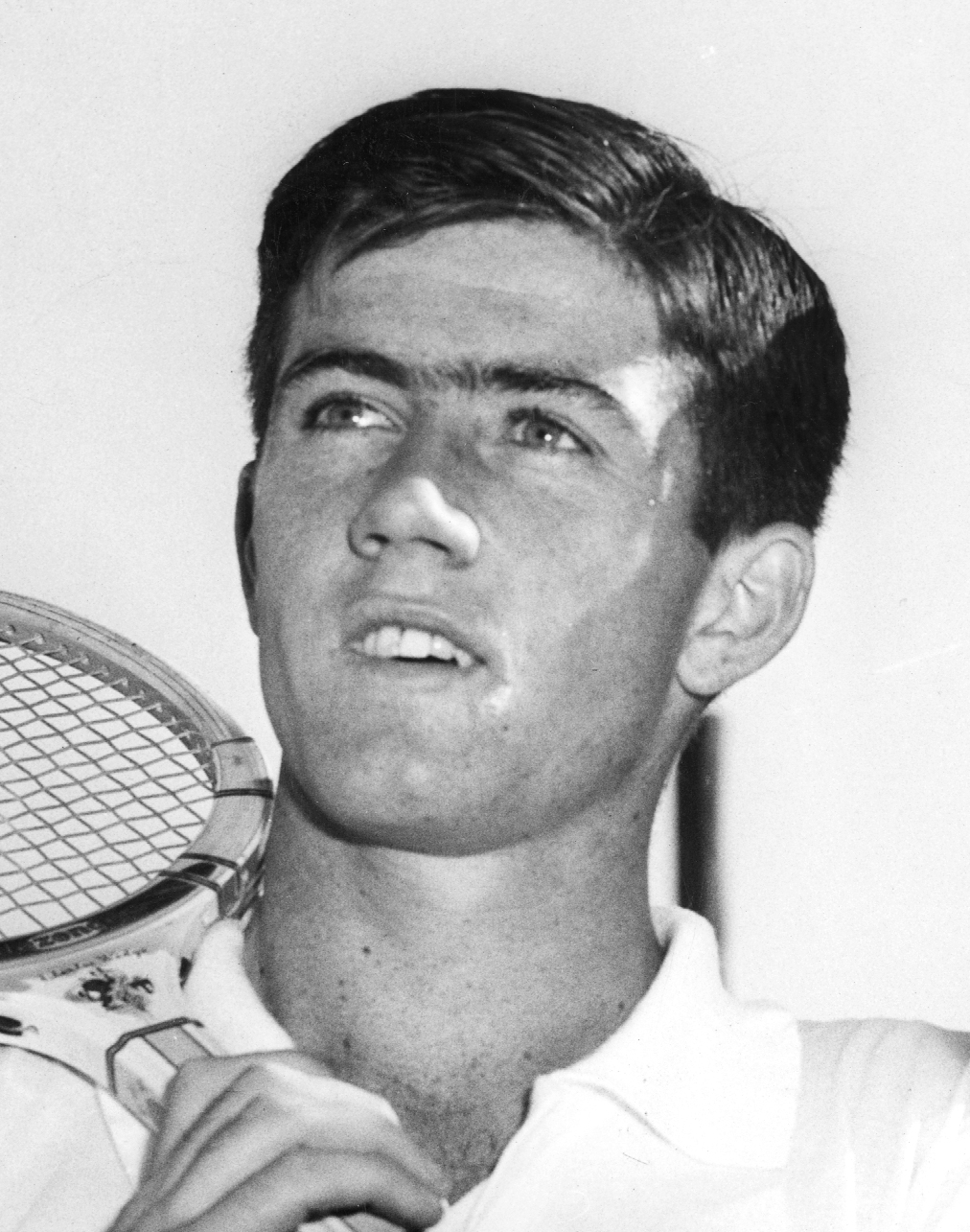
- Rosewall in the mid-1950s
- Full name: Kenneth Robert Rosewall
- Country (sports): Australia
- Residence: Sydney, New South Wales, Australia
- Born: 2 November 1934 (age 92) Sydney, New South Wales, Australia
- Height: 1.70 m (5 ft 7 in)
- Turned pro: 1956 (amateur since 1950)
- Retired: 1980
- Plays: Right-handed (one-handed backhand)
- Prize money: US$1,602,700
- Int. Tennis HoF: 1980 (member page)

Singles
- Career record: 1811–710
- Career titles: 147 (40 listed by the ATP)
- Highest ranking: No. 1 (1961, L'Équipe)

Grand Slam singles results
- Australian Open: W (1953, 1955, 1971, 1972)
- French Open: W (1953, 1968)
- Wimbledon: F (1954, 1956, 1970, 1974)
- US Open: W (1956, 1970)

Other tournaments
- Tour Finals: RR – 3rd (1970)
- WCT Finals: W (1971, 1972)
- Professional majors
- US Pro: W (1963, 1965)
- Wembley Pro: W (1957, 1960, 1961, 1962, 1963)
- French Pro: W (1958, 1960, 1961, 1962, 1963, 1964, 1965, 1966)
- Other pro events
- TOC: F (1958^{FH})

Doubles
- Career record: 211–113 (Open Era)
- Career titles: 14 listed by the ATP

Grand Slam doubles results
- Australian Open: W (1953, 1956, 1972)
- French Open: W (1953, 1968)
- Wimbledon: W (1953, 1956)
- US Open: W (1956, 1969)

Mixed doubles
- Career record: 21–6
- Career titles: 1

Grand Slam mixed doubles results
- French Open: SF (1953)
- Wimbledon: F (1954)
- US Open: W (1956)

Team competitions
- Davis Cup: W (1953, 1955, 1956, 1973)

Kenneth Robert Rosewall AM MBE (born 2 November 1934) is an Australian former world No. 1 professional tennis player. Rosewall won 147 singles titles, including 23 majors: a record 15 Pro Majors and eight Grand Slam tournaments. He also won 15 Pro Majors in doubles and nine Grand Slam doubles titles. Rosewall achieved a Pro Slam in singles in 1963 by winning the three Pro Majors in one year, and completed the career Grand Slam in doubles.

Rosewall had a renowned backhand and enjoyed a long career at the highest levels from the early 1950s to the early 1970s. He was ranked as the world No. 1 men's tennis player by multiple sources from 1961 to 1964, multiple sources in 1970, and Rino Tommasi in 1971 and 1972. Rosewall was first ranked in the top 20 in 1952, and last ranked in the top 20 in 1977. Rosewall is the only player to have simultaneously held Pro Slam titles on three different surfaces (1962–63). At the 1971 Australian Open, he became the first man in the Open Era to win a Grand Slam tournament without dropping a set. Rosewall won world professional championship tours in 1963, 1964, and the WCT titles in 1971 and 1972.

A natural left-hander, Rosewall was taught by his father to play right-handed. He developed a powerful, effective backhand, but his serve was merely accurate and relatively soft. He was 1.70 m (5 ft 7 in) tall, weighed 67 kg (148 lb), and sarcastically was nicknamed "Muscles" by his fellow-players because of his lack of them; however, he was fast, agile, and tireless, with a deadly volley. A father of two and grandfather of five, Rosewall lives in Brisbane, having previously lived in northern Sydney and the Gold Coast.

== Early life and tennis ==
Rosewall was born on 2 November 1934 in Hurstville, Sydney. His father, Robert Rosewall, was a grocer in Penshurst, New South Wales, and when Ken was one year old, they moved to Rockdale where his father bought three clay tennis courts. Ken started playing tennis at age 3 with a shortened racket and using both hands for forehand and backhand shots. They practised early in the morning, focusing on playing one type of shot for a period of weeks. He was a natural left-hander but was taught to play right-handed by his father. He played his first tournament when he was nine and lost to the eventual winner. At age eleven Rosewall won the Metropolitan Hardcourt Championships for under fourteen.

In his youth, Rosewall often played Lew Hoad, and they became known as the Sydney "twins", but they had very different physiques, personalities and playing styles. Their first match in Sydney in January 1947 (when both were aged 12) was played as an opener of an exhibition match between Australia and America. Rosewall won 6–0, 6–0. The two played again a few weeks later, and Rosewall won again in straight sets. Rosewall beat Hoad twice later in 1947 in state age-group championships. "At this stage the consistent baseline strategy of Rosewall was able to doggedly unravel any questions asked by his more aggressive, hard-hitting rival". In 1949, at age 14, Rosewall became the junior champion at the Australian Hardcourt Championships in Sydney, the youngest player to win an Australian title.

== Tennis career ==
=== Amateur career: 1950 to 1956 ===
1950

In September 1950, at the age of 15, and still a junior player, Rosewall reached the final of the 1950 New South Wales Metropolitan hard court championships, where he lost to Jim Gilchrist. In October, Rosewall reached the semifinals of the 1950 New South Wales Metropolitan grass court Championships (not to be confused with the New South Wales Championships), where he was defeated by the world-class adult player Ken McGregor.

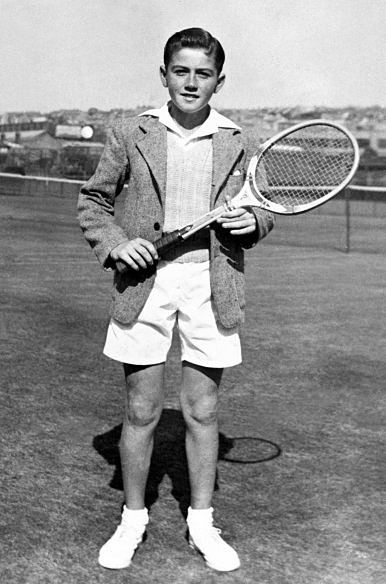
Rosewall, as a 12-year-old at White City, Sydney (1946)

1951

Rosewall won his first men's tournament in Manly, New South Wales in January against Gilchrist and was "the youngest player ever to capture the seaside title. It was also Rosewall's first important win in a tennis tournament. Rosewall played almost flawless ground shots. When he did come into the net, he made no mistake about volleying his winners. Rosewall's only weakness was his smash. He seemed to hurry this shot, and in the second set, he missed eight consecutive smashes." Rosewall beat Adrian Quist in the semifinals of the Brisbane exhibition tournament in August, but he lost the final to Lew Hoad. Ken lost in the final of Metropolitan Hardcourt championships at Naremburn to George Worthington in September. In the New South Wales championships in November, Rosewall pushed reigning Australian and Wimbledon champion Dick Savitt to four sets.

1952

In 1952, still only 17, Rosewall reached the quarterfinals of the U.S. Championships, upsetting the top-seeded Vic Seixas in the fourth round in five sets and then losing to Gardnar Mulloy in five sets. In his end-of-year rankings, the British tennis expert Lance Tingay ranked Rosewall and Lew Hoad, his equally youthful doubles partner, jointly as the tenth best amateur players in the world.

1953

Rosewall was only 18 years old when he won his first singles title at a Grand Slam event in 1953, defeating American Vic Seixas in the semifinals and compatriot Mervyn Rose in the final of the Australian Championships. He also won the French Championships, beating Seixas in the final in four sets, when "the young Australian's mastery in all phases of the game disheartened Seixas as Rosewall beat him repeatedly with perfectly placed shots". Rosewall was the top seed at Wimbledon, but lost in the quarterfinals to Kurt Nielsen. Rosewall reached the semifinals at the U.S. Championships, where he was defeated by Tony Trabert in straight sets.

At the Pacific Southwest Championships Rosewall beat Trabert in the semifinals and Seixas in the final in five sets and in the end "Rosewall's superior backhand probably decided the match." Rosewall lost to Trabert in the Challenge Round of the Davis Cup in Melbourne in three sets. Rosewall, however, won the fifth and deciding rubber of this tie, defeating Seixas in four sets. In early September, Tingay placed Trabert first and Rosewall second in his annual amateur rankings. The editors of Tennis de France magazine ranked Rosewall third behind Hoad and Trabert in a full season ranking for 1953. Harry Hopman ranked Rosewall third behind Hoad and Trabert in a full season ranking.

1954

In 1954, Rosewall lost in the semifinals of the Australian championships to Rose. Rosewall played "a fine net game" in beating Mal Anderson in the final of the Darling Downs tournament in April. He defeated Trabert in a five-set semifinal at Wimbledon but lost the final to crowd-favorite Jaroslav Drobný in four sets. At the U.S. Championships, Rosewall lost in the semifinals to Rex Hartwig. At the Victorian championships in December, Rosewall won the title, beating Seixas in the final (the seventh victory by Rosewall in eight meetings between the two players).

1955

Rosewall won the singles title at the Australian Championships for the second time in 1955, defeating Hoad in the final in three sets. Rosewall's "angled shots rattled Hoad and his returns of service were a match-winning factor. Hoad made 74 errors to Rosewall's 52." Ken did not play in the 1955 French Championships because it did not fit in the preparation of the Australian team for the Davis Cup. At Wimbledon, Rosewall lost in the semifinals to unseeded Kurt Nielsen. At the U.S. Championships, Trabert defeated Rosewall in the final in three sets.

1956

In 1956, Rosewall and Hoad captured all the Grand Slam men's doubles titles except at the French Championships, from which Rosewall was absent. For several years in their youthful careers, Rosewall and Hoad were known as "The Gold Dust Twins." In singles, Rosewall lost to Hoad in the final of two Grand Slam tournaments. At the Australian Championships, Hoad defeated Rosewall in four sets and at Wimbledon, Hoad won in four sets. Rosewall, however, prevented Hoad from winning the Grand Slam when Rosewall won their final at the U.S. Championships in four sets. "Rosewall owner of the best backhand in the game, ripped the lines with his passing shots, sent trickly lobs into the swirling winds and caught Hoad flat-footed with stop volleys and drop shots. Frequently Hoad would stop and shake his head in disbelief at some of Rosewall's returns."

Tingay and the editors of Tennis de France both ranked Rosewall No. 2 behind Hoad for 1956.

During his amateur career, Rosewall helped Australia win three Davis Cup Challenge Rounds (1953, 1955 and 1956). Rosewall won 15 of the 17 Davis Cup singles rubbers he played those years, including the last 14 in a row.

=== Professional career: 1957 to March 1968 ===
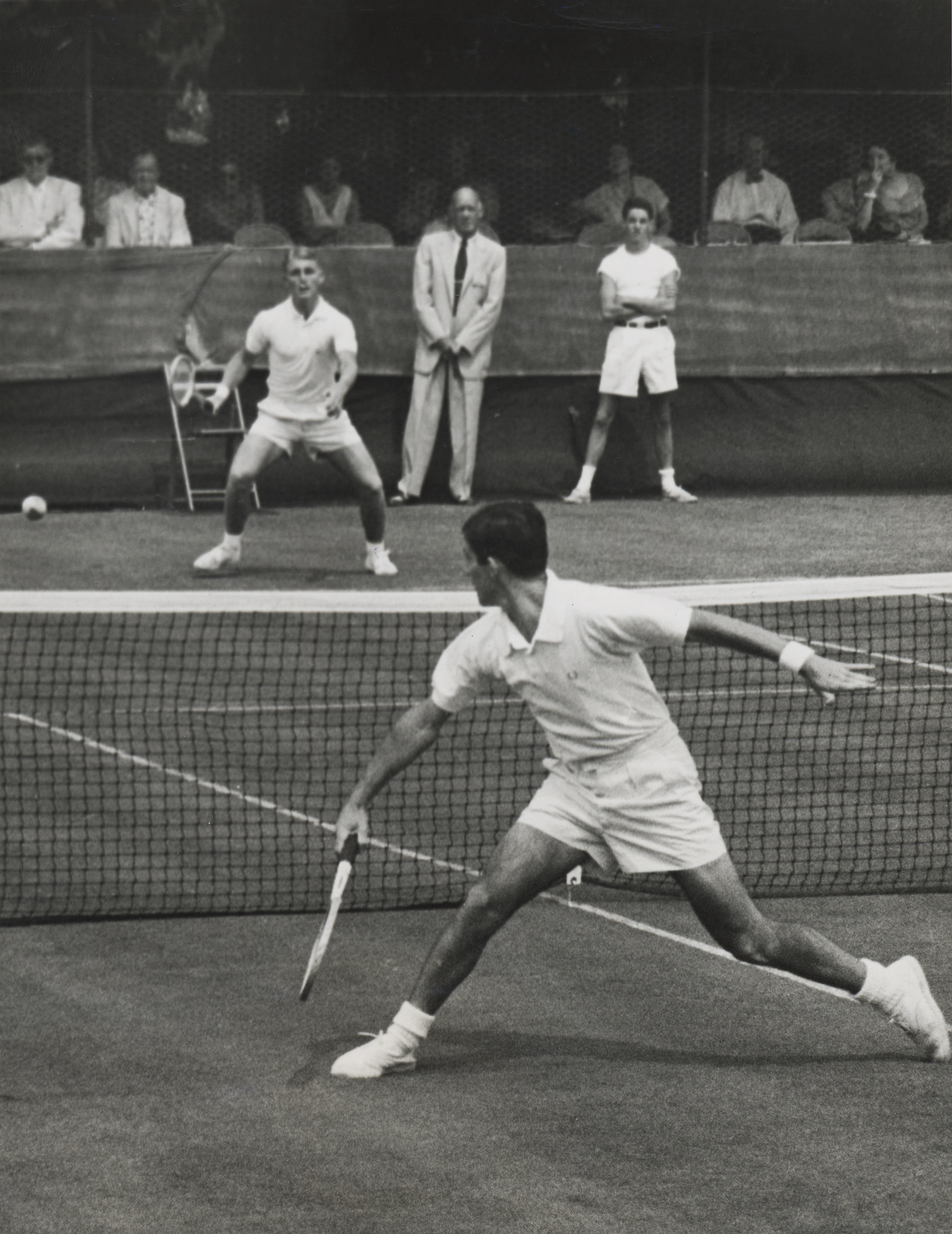
Rosewall (front) and Lew Hoad in the 1954 final of the Eastern Grass Court Championships in South Orange, N.J., USA.

Promoter and former tennis great Jack Kramer tried unsuccessfully to sign the "Whiz Kids" (Lew Hoad and Rosewall) to professional contracts in late 1955. But one year later, Rosewall accepted Kramer's offer on 30 December 1956. Rosewall, during the Challenge Round of the Davis Cup, tried to convince his partner Hoad to do the same, but he rejected the proposition.

==== 1957 ====
Rosewall played his first professional match on 14 January 1957 at Kooyong Stadium in Melbourne against Pancho Gonzales, the reigning king of professional tennis, who won a close five-set match. The following day, Rosewall defeated Gonzales in straight sets. Gonzales opened a lead of 5 to 1 in the Australian series. Rosewall explained later that there was a huge gap between the amateur level and the professional level. In their head-to-head world series tour in Australia and the U.S. (until May), Gonzales won 50 matches to Rosewall's 26. During this period, Rosewall also entered two tournaments, the Ampol White City Tournament of Champions at Sydney in February and the U.S. Pro in Cleveland, Ohio] in April. At both events, he was defeated in the semifinals in straight sets; by Frank Sedgman (second best pro in 1956) and Pancho Segura (third best pro in 1956), respectively. At the Forest Hills Tournament of Champions, a round-robin event held in New York, Rosewall defeated Segura and Hoad but lost to Gonzales, Sedgman and Trabert to finish in joint third place.

In September, Rosewall won the Wembley Pro title, beating Segura in a five-set final. This was a significant victory for Rosewall because, of the top professional players, only Sedgman and Tony Trabert did not play. At the end of the year, Rosewall won an Australian tour featuring Lew Hoad, Sedgman, and Segura. Rosewall was offered an undercard position against Trabert for the 1958 world championship tour, but declined.

==== 1958 ====
At the Kooyong Tournament of Champions at Kooyong in January, the richest tournament of the era, Rosewall finished in fourth place, beating Trabert and Segura, but losing to Sedgman, Hoad, and Gonzales.

Rosewall was the runner-up at the Forest Hills Tournament of Champions in June. Both he and Gonzales won five round-robin matches and lost one, but Gonzales claimed the title as he won their head-to-head encounter. Rosewall tied for second (with Pancho Gonzales and Sedgman) behind an undefeated Segura in the Masters Round Robin Pro in Los Angeles in July. These tournaments were among the more important of the year. Kramer designated Forest Hills, Kooyong, Sydney, and Los Angeles as the four major pro tennis tournaments. In September, Rosewall had the opportunity to show that he was still one of the better players on clay. The previous year, no French Professional Championships (also known as the World Pro Championships on Clay when organised at Stade Roland Garros) had been held. This tournament returned in 1958, and Rosewall beat Jack Kramer, Frank Sedgman, and an injured Lew Hoad in four sets to claim the title. At the Wembley Pro, Rosewall lost a close five-set semifinals to Trabert.

==== 1959 ====
In the Ampol Open Trophy points standings after February, part of a fifteen tournament world series, Rosewall was second with 12 points behind Hoad with 13. For the first time since he turned professional, Rosewall had a favourable 6–5 win–loss record against Pancho Gonzales for the year. Rosewall won both editions of the Queensland Pro Championships in Brisbane, both included in the Ampol series, defeating Tony Trabert in the January final in five sets and Gonzales in the December final in four sets. At the Forest Hills Tournament of Champions, Rosewall lost a semifinals to Hoad in four sets, and beat Trabert to win third place. At the Roland Garros World Professional Championships, Rosewall lost in the semifinals to Trabert, and was beaten by Hoad in the third place match.

At the White City Tournament of Champions in Sydney in early December, Rosewall lost in the semifinals to Gonzales in three straight sets. In the final Ampol series tournament, played at Kooyong from 26 December 1959 to 2 January 1960, Rosewall finished runner-up to Hoad, losing the deciding match to Hoad in four long sets. Kramer acclaimed this match as one of the greatest ever played. Rosewall finished third in the Ampol series with 41 bonus points, behind Hoad in first place (51 bonus points), and Gonzales in second place (43 bonus points). Rosewall's winning percentage on the 1959 Ampol series was 62% (26/42). Rosewall was 2 wins and 6 losses against Hoad and 3 wins and 1 loss against Gonzales during the series. Kramer's personal list ranked Rosewall world No. 3 professional tennis player behind Gonzales and Sedgman, but ahead of Hoad.

==== 1960 ====
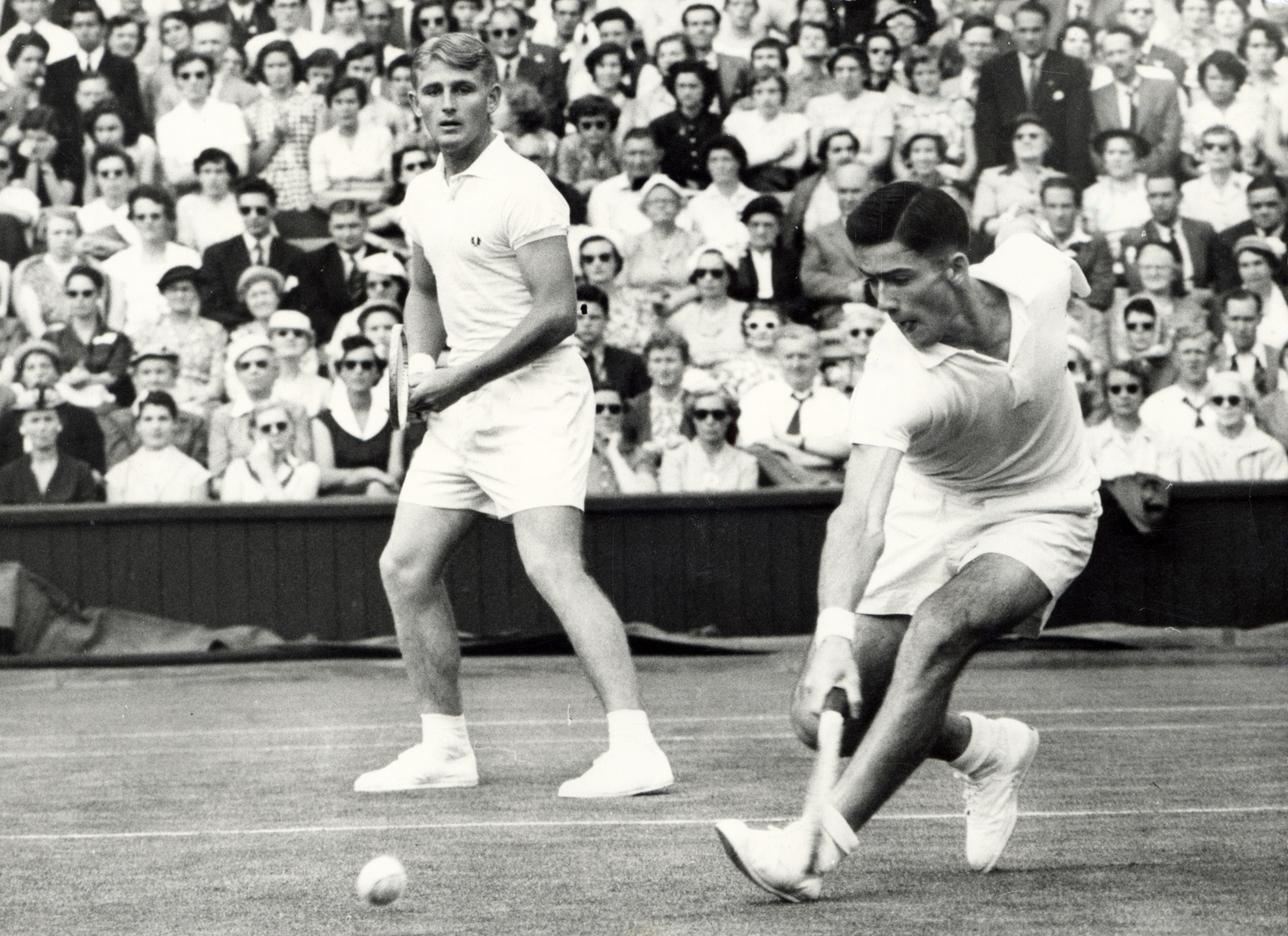
Rosewall (right) and Hoad playing doubles at the Wimbledon Championships in the mid-1950s

Rosewall was incorporated in a new World Pro tour, from January to May, featuring Gonzales, Segura and new recruit Alex Olmedo. This tour was perhaps the peak of Gonzales's entire career. The final standings were: 1) Gonzales 49 matches won – 8 lost, 2) Rosewall 32–25, 3) Segura 22–28, 4) Olmedo 11–44. Rosewall was therefore far behind Gonzales on this tour, the American having won almost all their direct confrontations (20 wins for Gonzales to 5 wins for Rosewall).

Rosewall began the tour slowly, dropping briefly in early February to fourth place in the overall standings behind Segura and Olmedo, and rising to second place in early March. Halfway through the North American part of the tour the standings were Gonzales 23–1 (his only match lost in three sets to Olmedo in Philadelphia), Segura 8–9, Rosewall 11–13. British Lawn Tennis reported, "While Kenny hasn't yet nailed Pancho, he has come within a couple of points several times. Rosewall finally got his serve working better, and he is now the tough little player he was last year. He'll get some wins over Big Pancho before long." As described in a later report, "Ken started very slowly against Gonzales, Segura and Olmedo but finished in second place behind Gonzales [and] more than held his own the last 20 matches with him, after getting over a physical problem."

In 1960 Rosewall won six tournaments including the two main tournaments of the year, the French Pro at Roland Garros, defeating Hoad in the final in four sets, and Wembley Pro, defeating Segura. Hoad won four tournaments in 1960, defeating Rosewall in all four finals.

Kramer's personal list ranked Rosewall world No. 3 professional tennis player behind Gonzales and Sedgman, but ahead of Hoad.

==== 1961 ====
After 10 years of World touring, Rosewall decided to take several long breaks in order to spend time with his family and entered no competitions in the first half of 1961, withdrawing from Kramer's World Series tour. He trained his long-time friend Hoad when the pros toured in Australia where Gonzales, back to the courts after a 7 1/2-month retirement, won another World tour featuring Hoad (withdrew with injury), Olmedo (replacing Rosewall), Gimeno and the two new recruits MacKay and Buchholz (Segura, Trabert, Cooper and Sedgman sometimes replaced the injured players).

In the summer Rosewall returned to the circuit and won the two biggest tournaments (all the best players participating): the French Pro (clay) and Wembley Pro (wood). At the French he captured the title by beating Gonzales in the final in four sets, and at Wembley he defeated Hoad in the final. In the summer Rosewall won a short head-to-head tour of France over Gonzales 4–2 and had a 7–4 edge over Gonzales for the entire year.

Rosewall teamed with Hoad to win the inaugural Kramer Cup trophy (the pro equivalent of the Davis Cup) in South Africa. Rosewall lost to Trabert in the first rubber, but defeated MacKay to set up the fifth and deciding rubber between Hoad and Trabert. After having won on clay and on wood Rosewall ended the season by winning on grass at the New South Wales Pro Championships in Sydney, defeating Butch Buchholz in the final, cementing his status as the best all-court player that year.

Although Gonzales had won Kramer's 1961 World Series tour, later in the year Rosewall won both Wembley Pro and French Pro, where Gonzales was reported in one source to lose his title. The USPLTA reported Rosewall as the world No. 1 ranked pro followed by Gonzales and Trabert. Robert Roy of L'Équipe, Kléber Haedens and Philippe Chatrier of Tennis de France, Michel Sutter (who has published "Vainqueurs 1946–1991 Winners"), Peter Rowley and Robert Geist considered Rosewall as the new No. 1 in the world.

==== 1962 ====
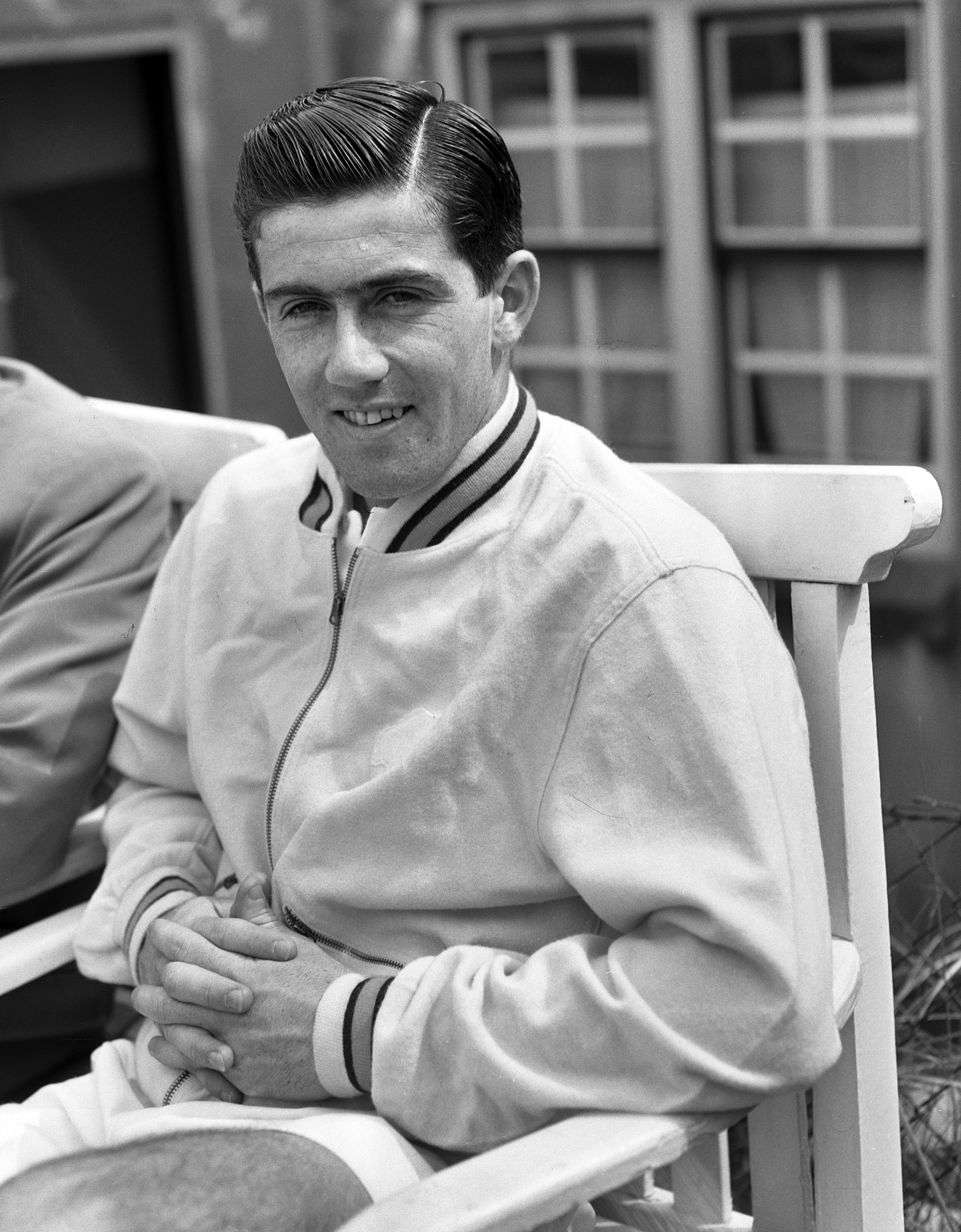
Rosewall at an exhibition in Noordwijk in July 1956

In 1962, Rosewall was the leading pro, winning most pro tournaments of all the players during the year. He retained his Wembley Pro and French Pro titles and also won tournaments at Adelaide, Melbourne, Christchurch, Auckland, Geneva, Milan and Stockholm. There was no World Series tour in 1962, and many of the top pros (Rosewall included) did not play pro matches in the U.S. during the year.

Per records found, Rosewall lost seven matches in 1962: Hoad (in the Adelaide Professional Indoor Tournament), Gimeno, Ayala, Buchholz, Segura, Anderson and Robert Haillet. Rosewall was ranked world No. 1 pro by Robert Geist and in a Time magazine article.

==== 1963 ====
In an Australasian tour (Australia and New Zealand) played on grass for the Australian portion, Rosewall defeated Rod Laver 11 matches to 2.

A US tour followed with Rosewall defending his world pro title against Laver, Gimeno, Ayala and two Americans: Butch Buchholz and Barry MacKay (Hoad was recovering from a shoulder injury). Rosewall entered as defending world pro titlist. In the first phase of this tour, lasting two and a half months, each player faced each other about eight times. Rosewall ended first (31 matches won – 10 lost in front of Laver (26–16), Buchholz (23–18), Gimeno (21–20), MacKay (12–29) and Ayala (11–30)). In this round-robin phase Rosewall beat Laver in the first 5 meetings, ensuring thus a 12-match winning streak (in counting the last 7 matches in Australasia) and Laver won the last 3. Then a second and final phase of the tour opposed the first (Rosewall) and the second (Laver) of the first phase to determine the final winner (the third (Buchholz) met the fourth (Gimeno)). In 18 matches Rosewall beat Laver 14 times to conquer the US tour first place (Gimeno beat Buchholz 11–7) and thus successfully defended his world pro title.

In mid-May, the tournament season started. In those occasions Rosewall only beat Laver 4–3 and won 5 tournaments (the same as Laver), but in particular he won the three main tournaments of the year 1963: chronologically the U.S. Pro at Forest Hills (without Gimeno and Sedgman) on grass where he defeated Laver in three straight sets, neither Rosewall nor Laver receiving any payment for the event. the French Pro at Coubertin on wood where his opponent in the final was again Laver who later praised his victor: "I played the finest tennis I believe I've ever produced, and he beat me", Rosewall won the Wembley Pro for the fourth consecutive time after a four-sets win against Hoad in the final. In those tournaments Rosewall won three times while Laver reached two finals and one quarterfinals (Wembley). Rosewall beat Laver 34 matches to 12. Rosewall was voted world number one pro by The International Professional Tennis Players Association.

==== 1964 ====
In early 1964, Rosewall finished third behind Hoad and Laver in a four-man, 24-match tour of New Zealand.

In 1964, Rosewall won one major pro tournament: the French Pro over Laver on an indoor wood surface (at Coubertin). At the end of the South African tour in October, Rosewall also beat Laver in three straight sets in a special challenge match, on cement, held in Ellis Park, Johannesburg. In the pro points rankings, Rosewall ended as the official No. 1 in 1964 ahead of Laver and Gonzales.

The majority of tennis observers (Joe McCauley, Norris McWhirter, Michel Sutter and British Lawn Tennis magazine) and the players themselves agreed with this points rankings for they considered Rosewall the number one in 1964. Rod Laver after his triumph over Rosewall at the Wembley Pro said "I've still plenty of ambitions left and would like to be the world's No. 1. Despite this win, I am not there yet – Ken is. I may have beaten him more often than he has beaten me this year but he has won the biggest tournaments except here. I've lost to other people but Ken hasn't."

Laver had a great season and could also claim the top rank. He captured two of the major pro tournaments: a) the U.S. Pro (outside Boston) over Rosewall (suffering from food poisoning) and Gonzales and b) Wembley Pro over Rosewall.

In 1964, Rosewall beat Gonzales 13 times out of 17, most of the matches taking place in Italy on clay, and Laver was beaten by Gonzales 7 times out of 12. In 1964, Laver had a leading win–loss record against Rosewall of 17–7.

==== 1965 ====
In early 1965 the pro circuit toured Australia and a number of defeats to Laver and Gonzales created some doubt about the continuation of Rosewall's dominance. In late April-early May Rosewall competed in the US Pro Indoors, held at the Seventh Regiment Armory in New York and part of a nine-tournament US circuit. He was the No. 1 seeded player but was overpowered by Gonzales in the semifinals and lost in straight sets. Fellow pro Mal Anderson commented in the July 1965 issue of World Tennis that Rosewall had too many responsibilities with the player's association while also defending his world number one ranking.

Until mid-September, Rosewall and Laver were quite equal, the latter winning more tournaments, including the US Pro Indoors and the Masters Pro at Los Angeles but Rosewall won the U.S. Pro, played on grass courts at the Longwood Cricket Club outside Boston, defeating Gonzales in the semifinals and Laver in the final, both in three straight sets and Rosewall again beat Laver in three sets in the French Pro final on the fast wooden courts at Coubertin.

==== 1966 ====
Laver and Rosewall shared all the titles and the finals of the five greatest tournaments. Rosewall won the Madison Square Garden Pro and the French Pro tournaments over Laver, the latter capturing Forest Hills Pro, the U.S. Pro (outside Boston) and Wembley Pro, with Rosewall finalist (or second) each time.

==== 1967 ====
The 20 main tournaments of the year were shared by a) Laver, ten titles including the five biggest ones, all played on fast courts (U.S. Pro, French Pro, Wembley Pro, Wimbledon Pro, Madison Square Garden, World Pro in Oklahoma, Boston Pro (not to be confused with the U.S. Pro), Newport R.R., Johannesburg Ellis Park, Coubertin Pro in April (not to be confused with the French Pro at Coubertin in October), b) Rosewall, six titles (Los Angeles, Berkeley, U.S. Pro Hardcourt in St Louis, Newport Beach, Durban and Cape Town), c) Gimeno, three titles (Cincinnati, East London, Port Elizabeth) and d) Stolle, one tournament (Transvaal Pro). Including lesser tournaments Laver's supremacy was even more obvious: 1) Laver 18 tournaments, plus two small tours 2) Rosewall seven tournaments 3) Stolle four tournaments and 4) Gimeno three tournaments. In head-to-head matches, Rosewall trailed Laver 5–8 and was equal with Gimeno 7–7.

Before 1967, Gimeno always trailed Rosewall in direct confrontations, but that year they split their matches. Rosewall defeated Gimeno in Los Angeles, Madison Square Garden, St Louis, Newport, Johannesburg (challenge match), Durban and Wembley whereas Gimeno won in Cincinnati, U.S. Pro, East London, Port Elizabeth, Johannesburg (tournament), Marseille, French Pro.

Forbidden to contest the greatest traditional events, Davis Cup and Grand Slams, during nearly 11 1/2 years from 1957 to 30 March 1968, Rosewall reached his best level during this period, in particular from 1960 to 1966, by winning at least 62 tournaments (including 16 less-than-eight-man events) and seven small tours.

=== Open-closed career: April 1968 to July 1972 ===
==== 1968 ====
During the 1968 season several categories of players coexisted:

- Amateur players, dependent on their national and international federations, allowed to play the amateur events and open events but forbidden to receive official prize money
- Registered players, also dependent on their national and international federations, eligible to play the Davis Cup and forbidden to play pro events as an amateur, but authorised to take prize money in the open events (e.g. Okker)
- Professionals under contract with the National Tennis League (NTL)
- Professionals under contract with the World Championship Tennis (WCT)
- Freelance professionals (e.g. Hoad, Ayala, Owen Davidson and Mal Anderson).

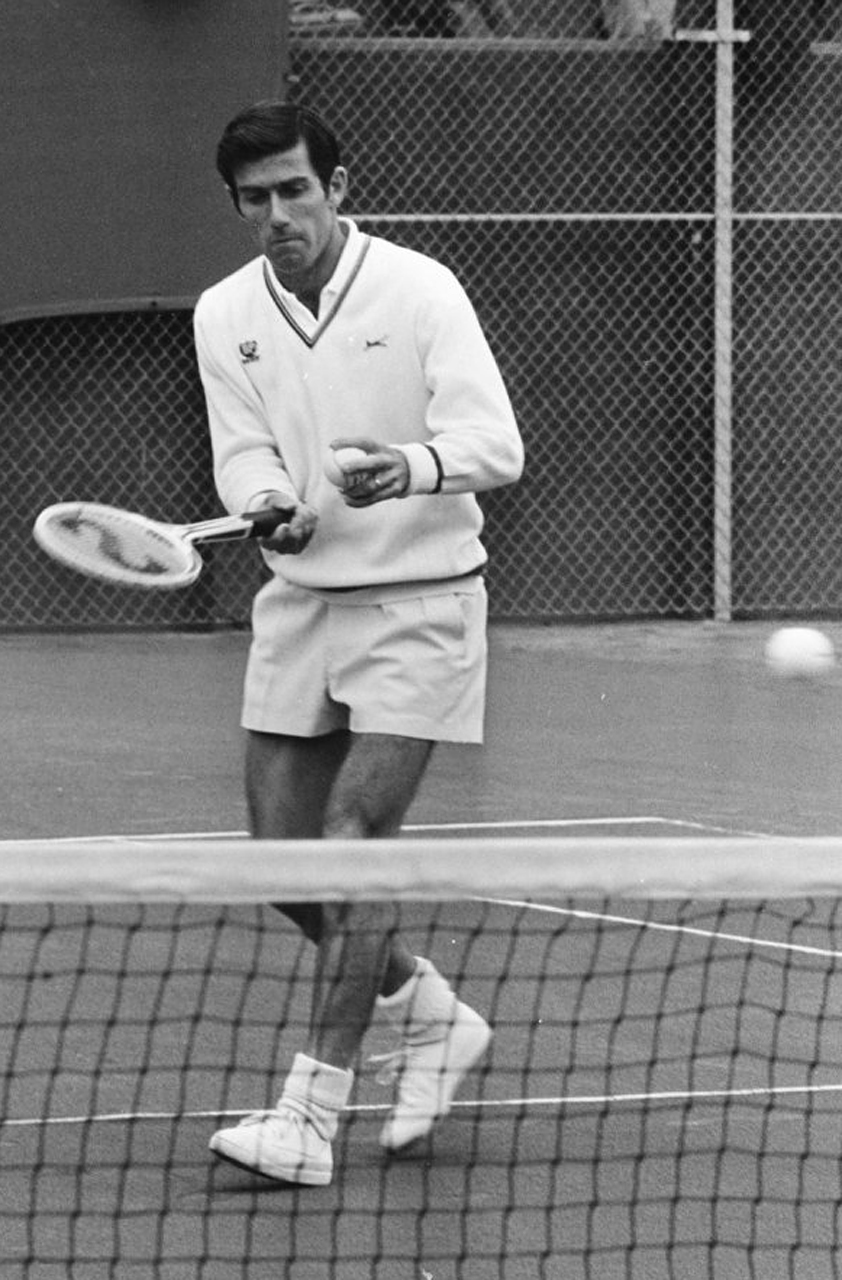
Rosewall (1970)

In 1968 there were a) an amateur circuit including the Davis Cup (closed to any "contract" professional until 1973) and the Australian Championships b) two pro circuits: WCT and NTL, which met at four tournaments and c) an open circuit (with a little more than 10 tournaments). At the beginning of the open era, WCT founder Dave Dixon did not allow his players to enter tournaments where NTL players were present: There were no WCT players at the first two open tournaments, the British Hard Court Championships and French Open, and all the NTL players were present. The first tournament where NTL and WCT players competed against each other was the U.S. Pro, held at Longwood in June. Several events still were reserved to the amateur players between 1968 and 1972.

Two tournaments were at the top in 1968: Wimbledon (a 128-man field), and the US Open (a 96-man field), both played on grass, where all the best players competed. Other notable tournaments that year were the Queen's Club tournament and the greatest pro tournaments where all the NTL and WCT pros competed (but without amateur or registered players) as the U.S. Pro (outside Boston, on grass), the French Pro (coming back to Roland Garros after the 5-edition interlude at Coubertin), the first Pacific Southwest Open in Los Angeles (64-man field) with all the best players present, the indoor professional championships at Wembley in November and the Madison Square Garden Pro in December with the four best pros of each organisation.

In this context Rosewall played almost all NTL pro tournaments in 1968, the four "NTL-WCT" tournaments and some open tournaments. He entered his first open tournament at 33 years old at Bournemouth on clay (the WCT players did not take part) and defeated Gimeno and Laver, to win the first open tennis title. At the French Open, the first Grand Slam tournament of the Open Era, Rosewall confirmed his status of best claycourt player in the world by defeating Laver in the final in four sets. Defeats followed against some of the upcoming 1967 amateur players (Roche twice on grass at the US Pro and at Wimbledon, Newcombe on clay at the French Pro and Okker on grass at the U.S. Open in the semifinals). Rosewall was finalist to Laver at the Pacific Southwest Open, defeating Arthur Ashe, the US Open winner, and in November, captured the Wembley Pro tournament over WCT player John Newcombe. At age 34, Rosewall was ranked No. 3 in the world behind Laver and Ashe according to Lance Tingay and Bud Collins. Rino Tommasi ranked Rosewall no. 2 behind Laver.

==== 1969 ====
Rosewall was no longer the best clay court player as Laver had taken his crown in the final of the French Open at Roland Garros. At Wimbledon, Rosewall lost in the third round to Bob Lutz and "confessed that for the first time in his career the fans disturbed his concentration". At the US Open, Rosewall lost in the quarterfinals to Arthur Ashe. Rosewall was ranked No. 4 that year by Bud Collins and 6 by Rino Tommasi. He won three tournaments (Bristol, Chicago, Midland).

==== 1970 ====
Being an NTL player at the beginning of 1970 he didn't play the Australian Open held at the White City Stadium in Sydney in January because NTL boss George McCall and his players thought that the prize money was too low for a Grand Slam tournament. In March, a tournament, sponsored by Dunlop, was organised at the same site, with a higher quality field because of better prize-money and a better date. Some of the same players as in the Australian Open were present and in addition not only the NTL pros participated but also some independent pros, such as Ilie Năstase, who usually did not make the trip to Australia. Laver won the tournament after defeating Rosewall in a five-set final watched by a crowd of 8,000. As both the NTL and the WCT boycotted the Roland Garros tournament because it refused to pay guarantees Rosewall also missed the second Grand Slam tournament of the year. All the best players met again at Wimbledon. This time, a rested Rosewall reached the final and took Newcombe, his junior by 9 1/2-years, to five sets but ultimately succumbed. In July, Rosewall became a WCT player after that organisation took over the NTL and its players. Two months later at the U.S. Open, one of the two 1970 Grand Slams with all the best players, Rosewall won over Newcombe in their semifinals in three straight sets before defeating Tony Roche in the final to win his sixth Grand Slam tournament.

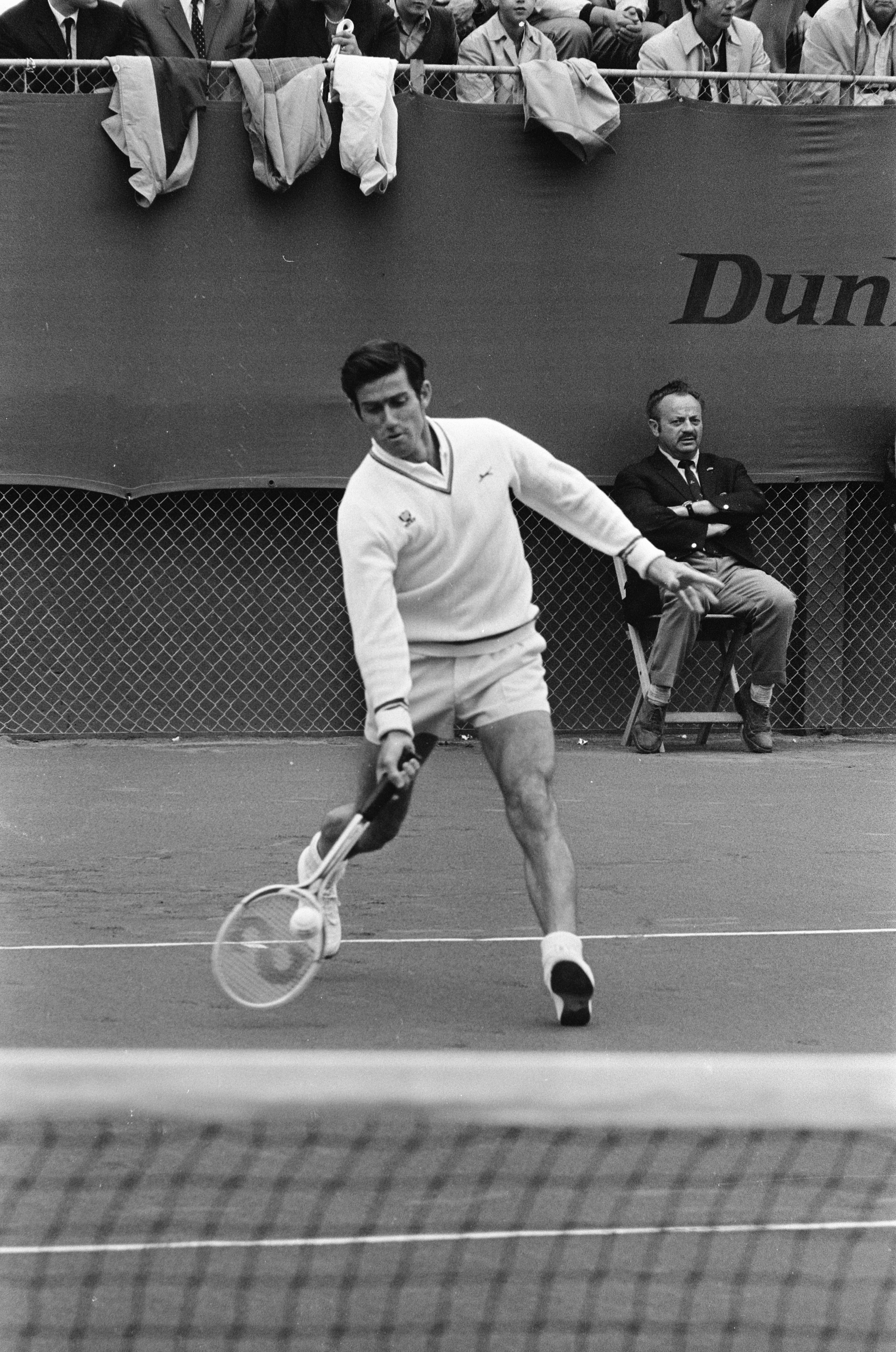
Rosewall in Scheveningen (1970)

To fight against the WCT and NTL promoters, who controlled their own players and did not allow them to compete where they wanted, Kramer introduced the Grand Prix tennis circuit in December 1969, open to all players. The first Grand Prix circuit was held in 1970 and comprised 20 tournaments from April to December. These tournaments gave points according to their categories and the players' performances with the top six ranked players invited to a season-ending tournament called the Masters. The amateurs and independent pros played in this circuit, while the contract pros firstly played their own circuit and eventually played in some Grand Prix tournaments. Rosewall and Laver performed well in both circuits. Rosewall was ranked third in the Grand Prix standings and finished third in the Masters behind winner Stan Smith and his 1970 nemesis Laver.

After his 1967–1969 steady decline, 1970 saw a rejuvenated Rosewall who was just one set short of winning the Wimbledon and U.S. Open double. 1970 was a year where no player dominated the circuit, the seven leading tournaments were won by seven different players, and different arguments were given to designate the World No. 1. Rino Tommasi ranked Rosewall number 1 as did Judith Elian. Bud Collins ranked him 2 behind Newcombe. In his book Robert Geist ranked the three Australians Laver, Newcombe and Rosewall equal number ones. Rosewall was ranked world No. 1 by the panel of 10 international journalists for the 'Martini and Rossi' Award, with 97 points (out of 100), with Laver second (89 pts).

==== 1971 ====
After his runner-up finishes at Sydney and Wimbledon and his victory at the US Open in 1970, Rosewall continued his good performances in 1971 in the great grass court tournaments. One year after the first Dunlop Open was held in Sydney, Rosewall was back in Sydney in March, this time for the Australian open held on the White City courts. Because it was sponsored by Dunlop in 1971, all the World Championship Tennis (WCT) players (including the National Tennis League players since spring 1970) entered (John Newcombe, Rosewall, Rod Laver, Tony Roche, Tom Okker, Arthur Ashe) as well as some independent pros. Only Stan Smith (Army's service), Cliff Richey, Clark Graebner, and the clay specialist players Ilie Năstase and Jan Kodeš were missing. Rosewall won the tournament, his second consecutive Grand Slam win and his seventh overall Grand Slam title, without losing a set and defeated Roy Emerson and Okker before beating Ashe in the final in straight sets.

Rosewall and most other WCT players did not play the French Open; yet, Rosewall still tried to reach his 1970s goal by winning Wimbledon. In the quarterfinals, Rosewall needed about four hours to defeat Richey in five sets, whereas Newcombe quickly defeated Colin Dibley. In the semifinals, the older Rosewall was no match for the younger Newcombe and lost in straight sets. Later in the summer, Rosewall and some other WCT players (Laver, Andrés Gimeno, Emerson, Cliff Drysdale, Fred Stolle, and Roche) did not play the US Open because of the growing conflict between the International Lawn Tennis Federation (ILTF) and the WCT. The illnesses of both his sons was an additional reason for Rosewall not playing this tournament.

As a contract pro, Rosewall was not allowed to play the Davis Cup, and he concentrated mainly on the WCT circuit organised similarly to the Grand Prix circuit which was the equivalent for the independent pros: 20 tournaments (including the Australian Open), each giving the same points amount. The top eight players in ranking points were invited to the WCT Finals, an eight-man tournament, equivalent of the Grand Prix Masters for the WCT players, played in November in Houston and Dallas. When the WCT players were off, they could play tournaments on the Grand Prix circuit. The war between the ILTF and WCT climaxed in a ban by the ILTF beginning on 1 January 1972 of the WCT players from the Grand Prix circuit.

Rosewall ended third on the 1971 WCT circuit behind Laver and Okker and qualified for the WCT Finals. He won the title, beating Newcombe in the quarterfinals, defeating Okker in the semifinals and beating Laver in a four-set final in what was considered at the time as the best match, with their 1970 Sydney final, between the two rivals since their 1968 French Open final. As a WCT player Rosewall played few Grand Prix tournaments but he had earned enough points to play the Grand Prix Masters held about ten days after his WCT Finals. He refused the invitation as he was tired after a long season and took his holidays at the end of the year.

In 1971, Rosewall won eight tournaments and 76 out of 97 matches (78%) and in direct confrontations trailed Newcombe 1–3, Laver 2–3 but led Smith 1–0. Collins ranked Rosewall third after Newcombe and Smith. Tingay ranked Rosewall 4th, Rino Tommasi 1st. Geist ranked Rosewall co-No. 1 tied with Newcombe and Smith. That year, as in 1970, there was no clear undisputed World No. 1.

==== 1972 ====
1972 saw a return to separate circuits because all traditional ILTF events held from January to July were forbidden to the WCT players. This included the Davis Cup but also the French Open and Wimbledon. The 1972 Australian Open organisers used a trick to avoid the ban of the WCT players. They held the tournament from 27 December 1971, four days before the ban could be applied, to 3 January 1972. Thus all contract as well as independent pros could enter but few were interested because it was held during Christmas and New Year's Day period. The draw included only eight non-Australian players. Rosewall reached the final in which he defeated Mal Anderson to win his fourth Australian title and the eighth, and last, Grand Slam title of his career and became the oldest Grand Slam male champion (37 years and 2 months old) in the Open Era. (Note: Arthur Gore won Wimbledon at the age of 41 years in the year 1909 and is the oldest Grand Slam singles winner in the history of tennis.)

A fragile agreement in the spring of 1972 let the WCT players come back to the traditional circuit in August (in Merion, WCT players Okker and Roger Taylor played). The US Open, won by Ilie Năstase, was the greatest event of the year as only in this tournament were all the best players present with the exception of Tony Roche who suffered from a tennis elbow. Later that year two other tournaments had good fields with WCT and independent pros: the Pacific Southwest Open at Los Angeles and, to a lesser extent, Stockholm, both won by Stan Smith.

In many 1972 rankings there were six or seven WCT players in the world top 10 (the three or four independent pros were Smith, Năstase, Orantes and sometimes Gimeno) so the season-ending WCT Finals held in May in Dallas were considered as one of the major events of the year. The final, played between Rosewall and Laver, was considered one of the two best matches played in 1972, the other being the Wimbledon final, and the best Rosewall-Laver match of the open era. It was broadcast nationally in the U.S., viewed by 23 million people, and became known as the "match that made tennis in the United States." Rosewall won the last major title of his long career by defeating Laver in an epic five-set match which was decided by a tiebreak. (Laver wrote that the two Australians had played better matches between them in the pre-open days, citing their 1963 French Pro final as the pinnacle; McCauley considered their 1964 Wembley final).

Because of the ILTF's ban once again Rosewall could not enter Wimbledon.

=== Open career: August 1972 to 1980 (and 1982) ===
==== 1972 ====
From August 1972 players could enter almost all the tournaments they wanted. The Association of Tennis Professionals (ATP) was created during the US Open. Rosewall won seven tournaments in 1972, including the depleted Australian Open. Rosewall was ranked 2 in 1972 by Bud Collins and number 1 by Rino Tommasi. He lost in the second round of the 1972 U.S. Open to Mark Cox. "Rosewall was the picture of dismay and frustration, often looking to the gray, leaden skies as if seeking help. He once pounded his fist on the rain-slicked grass after missing a shot, several times batting balls angrily away after Cox had scored a point."

==== 1973 ====
At the 1973 Australian Open (again with a weak field because as in 1972 among the top 20 only Rosewall and Newcombe participated), top-seeded Rosewall was defeated by "virtual unknown" German Karl Meiler in his first match (second round) in straight sets in a big upset. "It just wasn't the vintage Rosewall stuff we have come to expect from the Little Master. He seldom middled the ball, and was generally out-manoeuvred by the West German. Rosewall would not have said that he had been taking antibiotics for a throat infection unless he had been asked. Nor would he have admitted to feeling poorly when he played unless he had been asked." Between May 1972 (victory at Dallas) and April 1973 (victory at Houston, River Oaks) Rosewall captured only two minor titles, Tokyo WCT (not giving points for the WCT Finals) and Brisbane (in December 1972) where he was the only top 20 player.

Rosewall did not play Wimbledon that year as the edition was boycotted by the ATP players. After an absence of 17 years, Rosewall returned to Davis Cup play in November when he played a doubles match with Rod Laver in the interzonal final against Czechoslovakia.

Rosewall's best performances in 1973 were firstly his semifinals at the US Open (as in 1972 the greatest event of the year) and secondly his third place at the WCT Finals (he was beaten by Ashe in the semifinals and defeated Laver for 3rd place). He also won at Houston WCT, Cleveland WCT, Charlotte WCT, Osaka and Tokyo. He was still ranked in the top 10. Tommasi ranked Rosewall 4, Tingay 6, ATP 6 and Collins 5.

==== 1974 ====
1974 was the first year since 1952 that Rosewall did not win a single tournament. However, he entered nine tournaments (the one at Hong Kong not finished because of rain) and reached three finals including Wimbledon and US Open. At Wimbledon, Rosewall beat Newcombe in the quarterfinals in four sets. In the semifinals against Stan Smith, Rosewall was behind 0–2 sets 3–5 in games, and 5–6 in the tiebreaker at match point, but won three points in succession to take the set and went on to win in five sets to reach the final. This was his last Wimbledon final, at the age of 39. Despite the strong support of the crowd, who were eager to see him claim a Wimbledon title, he lost to Jimmy Connors. He was ranked between second (Tingay) and seventh place (Collins) by many tennis journalists. He ranked only 9th in the ATP rankings because he played too few tournaments due to playing World Team Tennis (Rosewall coached the Pittsburgh Triangles team in 1974.)

==== 1975–1982 ====
Rosewall still stayed in the top 10 (number 6 according to ATP, 10 according to Collins and 8 according to Tommasi) in 1975 winning 5 tournaments (Jackson, Houston-River Oaks, Louisville, Gstaad, Tokyo Gunze Open) and his two singles in Davis Cup against New Zealand (this event was opened to contract pros in 1973 : that year Rosewall was selected by Neale Fraser for the semifinals doubles). Rosewall made his last attempt at Wimbledon, at over 40, and as in his first Wimbledon Open (in 1968) he lost in the same round (4th) and against the same player (Tony Roche).

In 1976, Rosewall dropped out of the top 10 in the ATP rankings but stayed in the top 20, as he won three tournaments: Brisbane, Jackson WCT and Hong Kong (over Năstase then the 3rd player in the world).

1977 was Rosewall's last year in the top 20 in the ATP rankings (his first year in the top 10 was in 1952). In January he reached the semifinals of the 1977 Australian Open, losing in four sets to eventual champion Roscoe Tanner. He won his last two titles in Hong Kong and Tokyo (Gunze Open) respectively at the age of 43. Rosewall played in the Sydney Indoor Tournament in October 1977. Approaching his 43rd birthday he beat the No. 3 in the world Vitas Gerulaitis in a straight-sets semifinals and lost to Jimmy Connors in the final in three straight sets. The following year he lost in the semifinals at 44 years of age. Afterwards, he gradually retired. In October 1980 at the Melbourne indoor tournament, at nearly 46 years of age, Rosewall defeated American Butch Walts, ranked world No. 49, in the first round, then lost to Paul McNamee. Rosewall made a brief comeback at 47 years of age in a non-ATP tournament, the New South Wales Hardcourt Championships in Grafton in February 1982, where he reached the final, losing to Brett Edwards in two sets.

In 1972, Rosewall had been the second tennis pro to pass $1 million career earnings. In early 1978, his career earnings were $1,510,267.

== Rivalries ==
Gonzales and Laver are the two players that Rosewall most often met. His meetings with Laver are better documented and detailed than those with Gonzales.

Except the first year (1963) and the last year they played (1976), the statistics of their meetings show a domination by Laver. In the Open Era, a match score of 23–9 in favour of Laver can be documented, overall a score of 89–75.

Including tournaments and one-night stands, Rosewall and Gonzales played at least 204 matches, all of them as professionals. A match score of 117–87 in favor of Gonzales can be documented.

== Playing style and assessment ==
In his 1979 autobiography, Kramer wrote that "Rosewall was a backcourt player when he came into the pros, but he learned very quickly how to play the net. Eventually, for that matter, he became a master of it, as much out of physical preservation as for any other reason. I guarantee you that Kenny wouldn't have lasted into his forties as a world-class player if he hadn't learned to serve and volley." His sliced backhand was his strongest shot, and along with the very different backhand of former player Don Budge, has generally been considered one of the best, if not the best, backhands yet seen. He also had a first volley that was the best in the game.

His one-handed backhand, which he usually played with backspin, was rated as one of the great backhands in the history of the game. He is considered to be one of the greatest tennis players of all time.

Kramer included the Australian in his list of the 21 greatest players of all time, albeit in the second echelon. (Note: Writing in 1979, Kramer considered the best to have been either Don Budge (for consistent play) or Ellsworth Vines (at the height of his game). The next four best were, chronologically, Bill Tilden, Fred Perry, Bobby Riggs, and Pancho Gonzales. After these six, came the "second echelon" of Rod Laver, Lew Hoad, Ken Rosewall, Gottfried von Cramm, Ted Schroeder, Jack Crawford, Pancho Segura, Frank Sedgman, Tony Trabert, John Newcombe, Arthur Ashe, Stan Smith, Björn Borg, and Jimmy Connors. He felt unable to rank Henri Cochet and René Lacoste accurately, but felt they were among the very best.)

In 1988, a panel consisting of Bud Collins, Cliff Drysdale, and Butch Buchholz ranked their top five male tennis players of all time. Buchholz and Collins both listed Rosewall number three on their lists (Collins listed Rod Laver and John McEnroe above Rosewall and Buchholz listed Laver and Bjorn Borg above Rosewall). Drysdale did not list Rosewall in his top five.

During his long playing career he remained virtually injury-free, something that helped him to still win tournaments at the age of 43 and remain ranked in the top 15 in the world. Although he was a finalist four times at Wimbledon, and also at the Wimbledon Pro in 1967, it was the one major tournament that eluded him.

Rosewall was a finalist at the 1974 US Open at 39 years 310 days old, making him the oldest player to participate in two Grand Slam finals in the same year. Before that, in 1972 Rosewall won the Australian Open final at age 37 and 2 months making him the oldest male player to win a Grand Slam singles title in the Open Era as of 2021.

In 1995 Pancho Gonzales said of him: "He became better as he got older, more of a complete player. With the exception of me and Frank Sedgman, he could handle everybody else. Just the way he played, he got under Hoad's skin, but he had a forehand weakness and a serve weakness." In 202 matches against Gonzales, he won 87 and lost 117. In 135 matches against Lew Hoad, he won 84 and lost 51.

In the 2012 Tennis Channel series "100 Greatest of All Time", Rosewall was ranked number 13 among all time male tennis players, with only two Australian tennis players ranked ahead of him: Laver and Emerson.

== Career statistics ==
=== Major titles performance timeline ===
Ken Rosewall joined professional tennis in 1957 and was unable to compete in 45 Grand Slam tournaments until the open era arrived in 1968. Summarizing Grand Slam and Pro Slam tournaments, Rosewall won 23 titles, and he has a winning record of 246–46, which represents 84.24% spanning 28 years.

Key
W	F	SF	QF	#R	RR	Q#	DNQ	A	NH

(W) winner; (F) finalist; (SF) semifinalist; (QF) quarterfinalist; (#R) rounds 4, 3, 2, 1; (RR) round-robin stage; (Q#) qualification round; (DNQ) did not qualify; (A) absent; (NH) not held; (SR) strike rate (events won / competed); (W–L) win–loss record.

Grand Slam tournament	Amateur						Professional	Open Era professional												SR	W–L	Win %
Grand Slam tournament	1951	1952	1953	1954	1955	1956	1957–1967	1968	1969	1970	1971	1972	1973	1974	1975	1976	1977		1978	SR	W–L	Win %
Australian Open	1R	QF	W	SF	W	F	A		3R	A	W	W	2R	A	A	SF	SF	QF	3R	4 / 14	43–10	81.13
French Open	A	2R	W	4R	A	A	A	W	F	A	A	A	A	A	A	A	A		A	2 / 5	24–3	88.89
Wimbledon	A	2R	QF	F	SF	F	A	4R	3R	F	SF	A	A	F	4R	A	A		A	0 / 11	47–11	81.03
US Open	A	QF	SF	SF	F	W	A	SF	QF	W	A	2R	SF	F	A	A	3R		A	2 / 12	57–10	85.07
Win–loss	0–1	8–4	21–2	17–4	16–2	17–2		15–2	13–4	13–1	10–1	6–1	5–2	12–2	3–1	4–1	9–3		2–1	8 / 42	171–34	83.41

Pro Slam tournament	Professional											SR	W–L	Win %
Pro Slam tournament	1957	1958	1959	1960	1961	1962	1963	1964	1965	1966	1967	SR	W–L	Win %
U.S. Pro	SF	A	A	A	A	A	W	SF	W	F	SF	2 / 6	12–4	75.00
French Pro	NH	W	SF	W	W	W	W	W	W	W	SF	8 / 10	30–2	93.75
Wembley Pro	W	SF	SF	W	W	W	W	F	SF	F	F	5 / 11	29–6	82.86
Total:												15 / 27	71–12	85.54

=== Singles: 16 (8 titles, 8 runner-ups) ===
Result	Year	Championship	Surface	Opponent	Score
Win	1953	Australian Championships	Grass	(Australia) Mervyn Rose	6–0, 6–3, 6–4
Win	1953	French Championships	Clay	(United States) Vic Seixas	6–3, 6–4, 1–6, 6–2
Loss	1954	Wimbledon	Grass	(Egypt) Jaroslav Drobný	11–13, 6–4, 2–6, 7–9
Win	1955	Australian Championships	Grass	(Australia) Lew Hoad	9–7, 6–4, 6–4
Loss	1955	U.S. Championships	Grass	(United States) Tony Trabert	7–9, 3–6, 3–6
Loss	1956	Australian Championships	Grass	(Australia) Lew Hoad	4–6, 6–3, 4–6, 5–7
Loss	1956	Wimbledon	Grass	(Australia) Lew Hoad	2–6, 6–4, 5–7, 4–6
Win	1956	U.S. Championships	Grass	(Australia) Lew Hoad	4–6, 6–2, 6–3, 6–3
↓ Open Era ↓
Win	1968	French Open	Clay	(Australia) Rod Laver	6–3, 6–1, 2–6, 6–2
Loss	1969	French Open	Clay	(Australia) Rod Laver	4–6, 3–6, 4–6
Loss	1970	Wimbledon	Grass	(Australia) John Newcombe	7–5, 3–6, 2–6, 6–3, 1–6
Win	1970	US Open	Grass	(Australia) Tony Roche	2–6, 6–4, 7–6^{(5–2)}, 6–3
Win	1971	Australian Open	Grass	(United States) Arthur Ashe	6–1, 7–5, 6–3
Win	1972	Australian Open	Grass	(Australia) Malcolm Anderson	7–6^{(7–2)}, 6–3, 7–5
Loss	1974	Wimbledon	Grass	(United States) Jimmy Connors	1–6, 1–6, 4–6
Loss	1974	US Open	Grass	(United States) Jimmy Connors	1–6, 0–6, 1–6

=== Pro-Slam tournament finals ===
* Singles : 15 titles, 4 runner-ups

Result	Year	Championship	Surface	Opponent	Score
Win	1957	Wembley Championship	Indoor	(Ecuador) Pancho Segura	1–6, 6–3, 6–4, 3–6, 6–4
Win	1958	French Pro Championship	Clay	(Australia) Lew Hoad	3–6, 6–2, 6–4, 6–0
Win	1960	French Pro Championship	Clay	(Australia) Lew Hoad	6–2, 2–6, 6–2, 6–1
Win	1960	Wembley Championship	Indoor	(Ecuador) Pancho Segura	5–7, 8–6, 6–1, 6–3
Win	1961	French Pro Championship	Clay	(United States) Pancho Gonzales	2–6, 6–4, 6–3, 8–6
Win	1961	Wembley Championship	Indoor	(Australia) Lew Hoad	6–3, 3–6, 6–2, 6–3
Win	1962	French Pro Championship	Clay	(Spain) Andrés Gimeno	3–6, 6–2, 7–5, 6–2
Win	1962	Wembley Championship	Indoor	(Australia) Lew Hoad	6–4, 5–7, 15–13, 7–5
Win	1963	U.S. Pro Championship	Grass	(Australia) Rod Laver	6–4, 6–2, 6–2
Win	1963	French Pro Championship	Wood (i)	(Australia) Rod Laver	6–8, 6–4, 5–7, 6–3, 6–4
Win	1963	Wembley Championship	Indoor	(Australia) Lew Hoad	6–4, 6–2, 4–6, 6–3
Win	1964	French Pro Championship	Wood (i)	(Australia) Rod Laver	6–3, 7–5, 3–6, 6–3
Loss	1964	Wembley Championship	Indoor	(Australia) Rod Laver	5–7, 6–4, 7–5, 6–8, 6–8
Win	1965	U.S. Pro Championship	Grass	(Australia) Rod Laver	6–4, 6–3, 6–3
Win	1965	French Pro Championship	Wood (i)	(Australia) Rod Laver	6–3, 6–2, 6–4
Win	1966	French Pro Championship	Wood (i)	(Australia) Rod Laver	6–3, 6–2, 14–12
Loss	1966	Wembley Championship	Indoor	(Australia) Rod Laver	2–6, 2–6, 3–6
Loss	1966	U.S. Pro Championship	Grass	(Australia) Rod Laver	4–6, 6–4, 2–6, 10–8, 3–6
Loss	1967	Wembley Championship	Indoor	(Australia) Rod Laver	6–2, 1–6, 6–1, 6–8, 2–6

- * other events (Tournament of Champions, Wimbledon Pro – important professional tournaments – 2 runners-up)

== Records ==
=== All-time records ===
Championship	Years	Record accomplished	Player tied
Pro Slam	1963	Won the calendar year Professional Grand Slam	Rod Laver
Pro Slam and Grand Slam	1953–1974	52 combined Major semifinals overall	Stands alone
Pro Slam tournaments	1957–1967	27 appearances overall	Stands alone
Pro Slam tournaments	1957–1966	15 titles overall	Stands alone
Pro Slam tournaments	1957–1967	19 finals overall	Stands alone
Pro Slam tournaments	1957–1967	27 semifinals overall	Stands alone
Pro Slam tournaments	1957–1967	27 quarterfinals overall	Stands alone
Pro Slam tournaments	1957–1967	85.54% (71–12) match win percentage overall	Stands alone
Grand Slam	1953–1955	Youngest player to reach each Grand Slam final	Stands alone
Grand Slam	1953–1972	Won a Grand Slam title in three different decades	Novak Djokovic Rafael Nadal
Australian Championships	1953	Youngest singles champion (18 years, 2 months)	Stands alone
Australian Championships	1953–1972	19 year gap between first and last singles title	Stands alone
Australian Championships	1971	Won title without losing set	Don Budge; John Bromwich; Roy Emerson; Roger Federer
French Pro-Championship	1958–1966	8 titles overall	Stands alone
French Pro-Championship	1960–1966	7 consecutive titles	Stands alone
French Pro-Championship	1958–1967	93.75% (30–2) match win percentage	Stands alone
U.S. Championships	1956–1970	14 year gap between first and last singles title	Stands alone
Wembley Pro-Championships	1960–1963	4 consecutive titles	Rod Laver
All tournaments	1951–1970	20 wood court titles	Stands alone
All tournaments	1951–1977	25 seasons winning a singles title	Stands alone
All tournaments	1953–1973	21 consecutive seasons winning a title	Rod Laver
All tournaments	1952–1976	25 consecutive years ranked in the world's top 10	Stands alone
All tournaments	1949–1982	Most matches played (2282)	Stands alone
All tournaments	1949–1982	Most matches won (1665)	Stands alone

=== Open Era records ===
- These records were attained in Open Era of tennis.

Championship	Years	Record accomplished	Player tied
Australian Open	1971	Won title without losing a set	Roger Federer
Australian Open	1972	Oldest singles champion (37 years, 2 months)	Stands alone
US Open	1974	Oldest player in a Grand Slam final (39 years, 10 months)	Stands alone
WCT Finals	1971–1972	2 consecutive titles	John McEnroe
WCT Finals	1971–1973	87.50% (7–1) winning percentage	Stands alone

Note: The draw of Pro majors was significantly smaller than the traditional Grand Slam tournaments; usually they only had 16 or even fewer professional players, this meant only four rounds of play instead of the modern six or seven rounds.

== Personal life ==
Rosewall married Wilma McIver, a former representative tennis player for Queensland, at St John's Cathedral, Brisbane on 6 October 1956. It was described in press reports as Brisbane's society wedding of the year with over 2000 people in attendance outside the church, and 800 guests in the cathedral. The couple then moved to Turramurra in Sydney, educating their two sons at Barker College, Hornsby. They moved to live in Queensland. His wife died on 27 April 2020 in Sydney.

Rosewall was a non-executive director of the failed stockbroking firm BBY and his son, Glenn Rosewall, was the company's executive director.

== Honours ==
In the Queen's Birthday Honours of 1971, Rosewall was appointed a Member of the Order of the British Empire (MBE). In the Australia Day Honours of 1979, he was appointed a Member of the Order of Australia (AM). Rosewall was inducted into the International Tennis Hall of Fame in Newport, Rhode Island, in 1980. In 1985 he was inducted into the Sport Australia Hall of Fame. He is an Australian Living Treasure.

To honour his service to tennis, the centre court at the Sydney Olympic Park Tennis Centre was renamed the Ken Rosewall Arena in 2008.

Rosewall was invited to present the Men's Singles trophy at the 2023 Australian Open Championship to commemorate the seventieth anniversary of his first Australian single's championship victory.

== See also ==
- Tennis male players statistics
- All-time tennis records – Men's singles
- Open Era tennis records – Men's singles
