= 1968 U.S. Pro Tennis Championships =

- Date: June 12 – September 10
- Edition: 41st
- Draw: 16S
- Prize money: $32,000
- Surface: Grass / outdoor
- Location: Chestnut Hill, Massachusetts
- Venue: Longwood Cricket Club

Champions

Singles
- (Australia) Rod Laver
← 1967 ·	U.S. Pro Tennis Championships	· 1969 →

The 1968 U.S. Pro Tennis Championships was a men's professional tennis tournament played on outdoor grass courts courts at the Longwood Cricket Club in Chestnut Hill, Massachusetts. It was the 41st edition of the tournament, the first of the Open Era, and was scheduled to be held from June 12 through June 16, 1968. Due to bad weather the final was postponed from July to September 10, 1968. Rod Laver won the singles title, his fourth at the event, and earned $8,000 first-prize money.

== Finals ==
=== Singles ===
(Australia) Rod Laver defeated (Australia) John Newcombe 7–5, 6–4, 6–4
