= 1986 U.S. Pro Tennis Championships – Singles =

Singles
- 1986 U.S. Pro Tennis Championships

Final
- Champion: (Ecuador) Andrés Gómez
- Runner-up: (Argentina) Martín Jaite
- Score: 7–5, 6–4

Details
- Draw: 56 (5WC/7Q/3LL)
- Seeds: 16

Events
Singles	Doubles
- U.S. Pro Tennis Championships

Mats Wilander was the defending champion, but he chose to compete at Båstad during the same week, finishing as runner-up.

Andrés Gómez won the title by defeating Martín Jaite 7–5, 6–4 in the final.

== Seeds ==
The top eight seeds received a bye to the second round.

1. (Ecuador) Andrés Gómez (champion)
2. (France) Thierry Tulasne (quarterfinals)
3. (Argentina) Martín Jaite (final)
4. (Argentina) Guillermo Vilas (quarterfinals)
5. (United States) Jimmy Arias (quarterfinals)
6. (Sweden) Kent Carlsson (semifinals)
7. (Uruguay) Diego Pérez (third round)
8. (United States) Aaron Krickstein (quarterfinals)
9. (Czechoslovakia) Libor Pimek (third round)
10. (Argentina) Horacio de la Peña (semifinals)
11. (Peru) Jaime Yzaga (second round, retired)
12. (Peru) Pablo Arraya (second round, retired)
13. (Haiti) Ronald Agénor (third round)
14. (Spain) Fernando Luna (third round)
15. (South Africa) Christo Steyn (first round)
16. (n/a)

== Draw ==
Key

- Q = Qualifier
- WC = Wild card
- LL = Lucky loser
- Alt = Alternate
- ITF = ITF entry
- PR = Protected ranking
- SR = Special ranking
- SE = Special exempt
- JE = Junior exempt
- JR = Junior Accelerator Programme entrant
- CO = College Accelerator Programme entrant
- NG = Next Gen Accelerator Program entrant
- w/o = Walkover
- r = Retired
- d = Defaulted

=== Finals ===
Quarterfinals
1	(Ecuador) Andrés Gómez	6	6
8	(United States) Aaron Krickstein	3	4
4	(Argentina) Guillermo Vilas	1	3
6	(Sweden) Kent Carlsson	6	6
5	(United States) Jimmy Arias	5	2
3	(Argentina) Martín Jaite	7	6
10	(Argentina) Horacio de la Peña	2	6	6
2	(France) Thierry Tulasne	6	2	4

Semifinals
1	(Ecuador) Andrés Gómez	4	6	6
6	(Sweden) Kent Carlsson	6	4	2
3	(Argentina) Martín Jaite	6	6
10	(Argentina) Horacio de la Peña	2	1

Final
1	(Ecuador) Andrés Gómez	7	6
3	(Argentina) Martín Jaite	5	4

=== Top half ===
==== Section 1 ====
First round
Q	(United States) T Cain	3	1
(United States) L Duncan	6	6
(United States) J Brown	6	6
(United States) M Purcell	3	3
Q	(Spain) J Arrese	6	7
15	(South Africa) C Steyn	3	5
9	(Czechoslovakia) L Pimek	7	6
WC	(United States) R Leach	5	2
(Chile) H Gildemeister	3	7	6
(Czechoslovakia) K Nováček	6	5	2
(Romania) F Segărceanu	3	0
Q	(United States) M Buckley	6	6

Second round
1	(Ecuador) A Gómez	2	6	6
(United States) L Duncan	6	3	3
(United States) J Brown	5	2
Q	(Spain) J Arrese	7	6
9	(Czechoslovakia) L Pimek	6	6
(Chile) H Gildemeister	2	2
Q	(United States) M Buckley	3	0
8	(United States) A Krickstein	6	6

Third round
1	(Ecuador) A Gómez	4	7	6
Q	(Spain) J Arrese	6	6	0
9	(Czechoslovakia) L Pimek	1	3
8	(United States) A Krickstein	6	6

Quarterfinals
1	(Ecuador) A Gómez	6	6
8	(United States) A Krickstein	3	4

==== Section 2 ====
First round
(South Africa) M Roberston	6	6	6
(Australia) M Kratzmann	7	1	4
(Australia) B Drewett	6	3	3
WC	(Mexico) E Vélez	3	6	6
WC	(United States) Dan Nahirny	3	1
13	(Haiti) R Agénor	6	6
11	(Peru) J Yzaga	7	7
LL	(United States) T Warneke	5	6
Q	(United States) G Bezecny	4	2
(Sweden) H Sundström	6	6
Q	(United States) D Cassidy	7	4	6
(Italy) F Cancellotti	5	6	0

Second round
4	(Argentina) G Vilas	6	6	6
(South Africa) M Roberston	7	0	1
WC	(Mexico) E Vélez	3	2
13	(Haiti) R Agénor	6	6
11	(Peru) J Yzaga	1	6	1^{r}
(Sweden) H Sundström	6	3	4
Q	(United States) D Cassidy	2	1
6	(Sweden) K Carlsson	6	6

Third round
4	(Argentina) G Vilas	3	6	6
13	(Haiti) R Agénor	6	1	4
(Sweden) H Sundström	3	1
6	(Sweden) K Carlsson	6	6

Quarterfinals
4	(Argentina) G Vilas	1	3
6	(Sweden) K Carlsson	6	6

=== Bottom half ===
==== Section 3 ====
First round
(United States) J Levine	3	0
(Sweden) J Windahl	6	6
(Socialist Federal Republic of Yugoslavia) M Ostoja	6	6
(West Germany) H Schwaier	2	0
(United States) H Solomon	6	2	2
12	(Peru) P Arraya	4	6	6
14	(Spain) F Luna	6	6
(Sweden) S Eriksson	4	1
Q	(United States) B Willenborg	6	6
LL	(United States) R Brown	0	4
Q	(United States) M Flur	4	5
(Argentina) R Argüello	6	7

Second round
5	(United States) J Arias	7	6
(Sweden) J Windahl	6	3
(Socialist Federal Republic of Yugoslavia) M Ostoja	6	2
12	(Peru) P Arraya	2	0^{r}
14	(Spain) F Luna	7	6
Q	(United States) B Willenborg	6	1
(Argentina) R Argüello	2	4
3	(Argentina) M Jaite	6	6

Third round
5	(United States) J Arias	6	4	6
(Socialist Federal Republic of Yugoslavia) M Ostoja	2	6	2
14	(Spain) F Luna	1	5
3	(Argentina) M Jaite	6	7

Quarterfinals
5	(United States) J Arias	5	2
3	(Argentina) M Jaite	7	6

==== Section 4 ====
First round
WC	(United States) R Reneberg	6	4	6
WC	(Australia) B Custer	0	6	1
(United States) D Rostagno	4	6
(Sweden) J Carlsson	6	7
(Argentina) M Ingaramo	3	6
10	(Argentina) H de la Peña	6	7
LL	(Canada) H McDadi	6	4	4
(Spain) J Aguilera	2	6	6
(Brazil) C Kist	2	2
(Canada) M Wostenholme	6	6
(United States) D Goldie	2	6	2
(South Africa) B Moir	6	4	6

Second round
7	(Uruguay) D Pérez	7	6
WC	(United States) R Reneberg	5	2
(Sweden) J Carlsson	4	0
10	(Argentina) H de la Peña	6	6
(Spain) J Aguilera	3	2
(Canada) M Wostenholme	6	6
(South Africa) B Moir	2	2
2	(France) T Tulasne	6	6

Third round
7	(Uruguay) D Pérez	3	0
10	(Argentina) H de la Peña	6	6
(Canada) M Wostenholme	5	1
2	(France) T Tulasne	7	6

Quarterfinals
10	(Argentina) H de la Peña	2	6	6
2	(France) T Tulasne	6	2	4
