= 1986 South African Open – Singles =

Singles
- 1986 South African Open

Final
- Champion: (Israel) Amos Mansdorf
- Runner-up: (United States) Matt Anger
- Score: 6–3, 3–6, 6–2, 7–5

Details
- Draw: 32 (3WC/4Q)
- Seeds: 8

Events
Singles	Doubles
- South African Open

Matt Anger was the defending champion, but lost in the final to Amos Mansdorf. The score was 6–3, 3–6, 6–2, 7–5.

== Seeds ==
1. (Ecuador) Andrés Gómez (quarterfinals)
2. (France) Thierry Tulasne (first round)
3. (United States) Kevin Curren (second round)
4. (United States) Johan Kriek (semifinals)
5. (France) Guy Forget (first round)
6. (Switzerland) Jakob Hlasek (first round)
7. (United States) Jimmy Arias (first round)
8. (South Africa) Christo Steyn (first round)

== Draw ==
Key

- Q = Qualifier
- WC = Wild card
- LL = Lucky loser
- Alt = Alternate
- ITF = ITF entry
- PR = Protected ranking
- SR = Special ranking
- SE = Special exempt
- JE = Junior exempt
- JR = Junior Accelerator Programme entrant
- CO = College Accelerator Programme entrant
- NG = Next Gen Accelerator Program entrant
- w/o = Walkover
- r = Retired
- d = Defaulted

=== Finals ===
Semifinals
(Israel) Amos Mansdorf	6	7
(South Africa) Eddie Edwards	0	5
4	(United States) Johan Kriek	6	6
(United States) Matt Anger	7	7

Final
(Israel) Amos Mansdorf	6	3	6	7
(United States) Matt Anger	3	6	2	5

=== Top half ===
First round
1	(Ecuador) A Gómez	4	7	6
(United Kingdom) J Bates	6	6	1
WC	(South Africa) P Aldrich	4	6	6
(South Africa) M Robertson	6	3	2
Q	(Australia) L Warder	3	6
(United States) M De Palmer	6	7
(Israel) A Mansdorf	7	6
8	(South Africa) C Steyn	6	1
3	(United States) K Curren	3	6	7
Q	(Paraguay) F González	6	3	6
(Australia) B Dyke	7	7
(United States) J Sadri	6	5
(South Africa) E Edwards	7	6	6
(South Africa) B Moir	6	7	4
(Australia) W Masur	6	7
5	(France) G Forget	4	6

Second round
1	(Ecuador) A Gómez	6	3	6
WC	(South Africa) P Aldrich	2	6	3
(United States) M De Palmer	2	1
(Israel) A Mansdorf	6	6
3	(United States) K Curren	3	6	5
(Australia) B Dyke	6	4	7
(South Africa) E Edwards	6	6
(Australia) W Masur	4	4

Quarterfinals
1	(Ecuador) A Gómez	4	4
(Israel) A Mansdorf	6	6
(Australia) B Dyke	6	7	3
(South Africa) E Edwards	7	5	6

Semifinals
(Israel) A Mansdorf	6	7
(South Africa) E Edwards	0	5

=== Bottom half ===
First round
6/WC	(Switzerland) J Hlasek	3	6
WC	(South Africa) S van der Merwe	6	7
(South Africa) D Visser	6	6	7
(United States) J Lapidus	1	7	5
(South Africa) D Maasdorp	0	6	5
(South Africa) C van Rensburg	6	4	7
Q	(United States) D Cassidy	4	7	6
4	(United States) J Kriek	6	5	7
7	(United States) J Arias	7	3	3
(West Germany) M Westphal	6	6	6
(Israel) S Perkiss	2	4
(United States) B Testerman	6	6
(Australia) M Woodforde	4	5
Q	(Israel) S Glickstein	6	7
(United States) M Anger	6	6	6
2	(France) T Tulasne	2	7	2

Second round
WC	(South Africa) S van der Merwe	3	4
(South Africa) D Visser	6	6
(South Africa) C van Rensburg	4	6	6
4	(United States) J Kriek	6	3	7
(West Germany) M Westphal	3	6	6
(United States) B Testerman	6	4	4
Q	(Israel) S Glickstein	7	1	2
(United States) M Anger	6	6	6

Quarterfinals
(South Africa) D Visser	6	7	5
4	(United States) J Kriek	7	6	7
(West Germany) M Westphal	3	3
(United States) M Anger	6	6

Semifinals
4	(United States) J Kriek	6	6
(United States) M Anger	7	7
