= 1986 South African Open – Doubles =

Doubles
- 1986 South African Open

Final
- Champions: (United States) Mike De Palmer (South Africa) Christo van Rensburg
- Runners-up: (Ecuador) Andrés Gómez (United States) Sherwood Stewart
- Score: 3–6, 6–2, 7–6^{(7–4)}

Details
- Draw: 16 (1WC)
- Seeds: 4

Events
Singles	Doubles
- South African Open

Colin Dowdeswell and Christo van Rensburg were the defending champions, but Dowdeswell retired from professional tennis at the end of the season, after playing his last tournament at Paris during the previous month.

Van Rensburg teamed up with Mike De Palmer and successfully defended his title, by defeating Andrés Gómez and Sherwood Stewart 3–6, 6–2, 7–6^{(7–4)} in the final.

== Seeds ==
1. (Ecuador) Andrés Gómez / (United States) Sherwood Stewart (final)
2. (United States) Mike De Palmer / (South Africa) Christo van Rensburg (champions)
3. (France) Guy Forget / (South Africa) Gary Muller (quarterfinals)
4. (South Africa) Christo Steyn / (South Africa) Danie Visser (quarterfinals)

== Draw ==
Key

- Q = Qualifier
- WC = Wild card
- LL = Lucky loser
- Alt = Alternate
- ITF = ITF entry
- PR = Protected ranking
- SR = Special ranking
- SE = Special exempt
- JE = Junior exempt
- JR = Junior Accelerator Programme entrant
- CO = College Accelerator Programme entrant
- NG = Next Gen Accelerator Program entrant
- w/o = Walkover
- r = Retired
- d = Defaulted

=== Draw ===
First round
1	(Ecuador) A Gómez (United States) S Stewart	6	7	6
(United Kingdom) J Bates (Australia) M Woodforde	7	5	3
(South Africa) E Edwards (Paraguay) F González	6	4	7
(Australia) B Dyke (Australia) W Masur	3	6	6
4	(South Africa) C Steyn (South Africa) D Visser	6	6
(United States) J Arias (United States) J Sadri	2	2
(United States) B Levine (Australia) L Warder	1	2
(Israel) S Glickstein (Israel) A Mansdorf	6	6
(United States) K Curren (United States) J Kriek	3	3
(South Africa) M Robertson (United States) T Warneke	6	6
WC	(South Africa) P Aldrich (United States) B Green	3	7	2
3	(France) G Forget (South Africa) G Muller	6	6	6
(United States) D Cassidy (South Africa) B Moir	6	7
(South Africa) C Campbell (South Africa) D Maasdorp	1	6
(United States) M Anger (United States) B Testerman	4	6	3
2	(United States) M De Palmer (South Africa) C van Rensburg	6	0	6

Quarterfinals
1	(Ecuador) A Gómez (United States) S Stewart	6	6
(South Africa) E Edwards (Paraguay) F González	2	1
4	(South Africa) C Steyn (South Africa) D Visser	5	6	6
(Israel) S Glickstein (Israel) A Mansdorf	7	0	7
(South Africa) M Robertson (United States) T Warneke	4	6	7
3	(France) G Forget (South Africa) G Muller	6	3	6
(United States) D Cassidy (South Africa) B Moir	4	1
2	(United States) M De Palmer (South Africa) C van Rensburg	6	6

Semifinals
1	(Ecuador) A Gómez (United States) S Stewart	6	7
(Israel) S Glickstein (Israel) A Mansdorf	2	5
(South Africa) M Robertson (United States) T Warneke	2	6
2	(United States) M De Palmer (South Africa) C van Rensburg	6	7

Final
1	(Ecuador) A Gómez (United States) S Stewart	6	2	6^{4}
2	(United States) M De Palmer (South Africa) C van Rensburg	3	6	7^{7}
