= 1986 U.S. Pro Tennis Championships – Doubles =

Doubles
- 1986 U.S. Pro Tennis Championships

Final
- Champions: (Chile) Hans Gildemeister (Ecuador) Andrés Gómez
- Runners-up: (United States) Dan Cassidy (United States) Mel Purcell
- Score: 4–6, 7–5, 6–0

Details
- Draw: 28 (3WC)
- Seeds: 8

Events
Singles	Doubles
- U.S. Pro Tennis Championships

Libor Pimek and Slobodan Živojinović were the defending champions, but Živojinović chose to rest after competing in the Davis Cup the previous week. Pimek teamed up with Blaine Willenborg and lost in the second round to Dan Goldie and David Graham.

Hans Gildemeister and Andrés Gómez won the title by defeating Dan Cassidy and Mel Purcell 4–6, 7–5, 6–0 in the final.

== Seeds ==
The top four seeds received a bye to the second round.

1. (Chile) Hans Gildemeister / (Ecuador) Andrés Gómez (champions)
2. (United States) Gary Donnelly / (South Africa) Christo Steyn (second round)
3. (South Africa) Michael Robertson / (United States) Tomm Warneke (quarterfinals)
4. (Czechoslovakia) Libor Pimek / (United States) Blaine Willenborg (second round)
5. (Finland) Leo Palin / (Finland) Olli Rahnasto (second round)
6. (Haiti) Ronald Agénor / (France) Thierry Tulasne (first round)
7. (Spain) Jordi Arrese / (Spain) Jorge Bardou (first round)
8. (Australia) Brett Custer / (Australia) Mark Kratzmann (first round)

== Draw ==
Key

- Q = Qualifier
- WC = Wild card
- LL = Lucky loser
- Alt = Alternate
- ITF = ITF entry
- PR = Protected ranking
- SR = Special ranking
- SE = Special exempt
- JE = Junior exempt
- JR = Junior Accelerator Programme entrant
- CO = College Accelerator Programme entrant
- NG = Next Gen Accelerator Program entrant
- w/o = Walkover
- r = Retired
- d = Defaulted

=== Finals ===
Semifinals
1	(Chile) Hans Gildemeister (Ecuador) Andrés Gómez	6	6
(United States) Dan Goldie (Australia) David Graham	2	4
(South Africa) Barry Moir (Sweden) Jörgen Windahl	4	6
(United States) Dan Cassidy (United States) Mel Purcell	6	7

Final
1	(Chile) Hans Gildemeister (Ecuador) Andrés Gómez	4	7	6
(United States) Dan Cassidy (United States) Mel Purcell	6	5	0

=== Top half ===
First round
WC	(United States) J Berger (United States) B Blair	1	6	7
WC	(United States) B Farrow (United States) Dan Nahirny	6	4	6
(United States) R Baxter (United States) J Ross	4	4
(United States) K Richter (United States) R Rudeen	6	6
(Australia) C Eagle (United States) J Ross	6	1	6
7	(Spain) J Arrese (Spain) J Bardou	1	6	4
(United States) Eric Riley (United States) Mark Riley	3	3
(United States) D Goldie (Australia) D Graham	6	6
(Argentina) M Jaite (Uruguay) D Pérez	6	2	7
WC	(United States) R Reneberg (United States) R Weiss	2	6	6
(Sweden) J Carlsson (Sweden) S Eriksson	7	6
6	(Haiti) R Agénor (France) T Tulasne	6	4

Second round
1	(Chile) H Gildemeister (Ecuador) A Gómez	6	6	6
WC	(United States) J Berger (United States) B Blair	7	1	4
(United States) K Richter (United States) R Rudeen	6	5	7
(Australia) C Eagle (United States) J Ross	4	7	6
4	(Czechoslovakia) L Pimek (United States) B Willenborg	3	4
(United States) D Goldie (Australia) D Graham	6	6
(Argentina) M Jaite (Uruguay) D Pérez	4	5
(Sweden) J Carlsson (Sweden) S Eriksson	6	7

Quarterfinals
1	(Chile) H Gildemeister (Ecuador) A Gómez	4	6	6
(United States) K Richter (United States) R Rudeen	6	4	4
(United States) D Goldie (Australia) D Graham	4	6	6
(Sweden) J Carlsson (Sweden) S Eriksson	6	3	3

Semifinals
1	(Chile) H Gildemeister (Ecuador) A Gómez	6	6
(United States) D Goldie (Australia) D Graham	2	4

=== Bottom half ===
First round
5	(Finland) L Palin (Finland) O Rahnasto	6	6
(Argentina) M Ingaramo (Brazil) C Kist	4	3
(India) A Amritraj (United States) D Rostagno	6	5
(South Africa) B Moir (Sweden) J Windahl	7	7
(Sweden) K Carlsson (Socialist Federal Republic of Yugoslavia) M Ostoja	4	6
(United States) M Flur (United States) C Kennedy	6	7
8	(Australia) B Custer (Australia) M Kratzmann	4	5
(Italy) F Cancellotti (West Germany) H Schwaier	6	7
(Canada) H McDadi (Canada) M Wostenholme	1	3
(United States) R Leach (United States) J Levine	6	6
(United States) R Brown (United States) T Erck	7	6	4
(United States) D Cassidy (United States) M Purcell	6	7	6

Second round
5	(Finland) L Palin (Finland) O Rahnasto	3	6
(South Africa) B Moir (Sweden) J Windahl	6	7
(United States) M Flur (United States) C Kennedy	6	4	3
3	(South Africa) M Robertson (United States) T Warneke	3	6	6
(Italy) F Cancellotti (West Germany) H Schwaier	6	6
(United States) R Leach (United States) J Levine	4	2
(United States) D Cassidy (United States) M Purcell	7	6	6
2	(United States) G Donnelly (South Africa) C Steyn	6	7	1

Quarterfinals
(South Africa) B Moir (Sweden) J Windahl	7	6
3	(South Africa) M Robertson (United States) T Warneke	5	2
(Italy) F Cancellotti (West Germany) H Schwaier	6	2
(United States) D Cassidy (United States) M Purcell	7	6

Semifinals
(South Africa) B Moir (Sweden) J Windahl	4	6
(United States) D Cassidy (United States) M Purcell	6	7
