= 1985 South African Open – Doubles =

Doubles
- 1985 South African Open

Final
- Champions: (United Kingdom) Colin Dowdeswell (South Africa) Christo van Rensburg
- Runners-up: (Israel) Amos Mansdorf (Israel) Shahar Perkiss
- Score: 3–6, 7–6^{(7–5)}, 6–4

Details
- Draw: 16
- Seeds: 4

Events
Singles	Doubles
- South African Open

Tracy Delatte and Francisco Gonzalez were the defending champions, but González chose to compete at Brisbane during the same week. Delatte teamed up with Mike De Palmer and lost in the semifinals to Amos Mansdorf and Shahar Perkiss.

Colin Dowdeswell and Christo van Rensburg won the title by defeating Mansdorf and Perkiss 3–6, 7–6^{(7–5)}, 6–4 in the final.

== Seeds ==
1. (United States) Johan Kriek / (United States) Steve Meister (first round)
2. (United Kingdom) Colin Dowdeswell / (South Africa) Christo van Rensburg (champions)
3. (United States) Scott Davis / (United States) Brad Gilbert (semifinals)
4. (United States) Tracy Delatte / (United States) Mike De Palmer (semifinals)

== Draw ==
Key

- Q = Qualifier
- WC = Wild card
- LL = Lucky loser
- Alt = Alternate
- ITF = ITF entry
- PR = Protected ranking
- SR = Special ranking
- SE = Special exempt
- JE = Junior exempt
- JR = Junior Accelerator Programme entrant
- CO = College Accelerator Programme entrant
- NG = Next Gen Accelerator Program entrant
- w/o = Walkover
- r = Retired
- d = Defaulted

=== Draw ===
First round
1	(United States) J Kriek (United States) S Meister	6	5	4
(Israel) A Mansdorf (Israel) S Perkiss	3	7	6
(United Kingdom) D Felgate (United Kingdom) S Shaw	4	2
(United Kingdom) J Bates (Argentina) R Saad	6	6
4	(United States) T Delatte (United States) M De Palmer	7	4	6
(United States) B Green (United States) L Stefanki	5	6	2
(South Africa) C Honey (South Africa) C Steyn	3	6	3
(South Africa) E Edwards (South Africa) D Visser	6	3	6
(United States) M Anger (United States) M Wooldridge	3	2
(Republic of Ireland) M Doyle (West Germany) W Popp	6	6
(South Africa) B Moir (South Africa) B Pirow	2	3
3	(United States) S Davis (United States) B Gilbert	6	6
(United States) M Bauer (South Africa) M Robertson	6	6
(United States) J Lapidus (United States) B Levine	4	4
(South Africa) G Muller (South Africa) J Sadri	7	2	4
2	(United Kingdom) C Dowdeswell (South Africa) C van Rensburg	6	6	6

Quarterfinals
(Israel) A Mansdorf (Israel) S Perkiss	7	6
(United Kingdom) J Bates (Argentina) R Saad	6	3
4	(United States) T Delatte (United States) M De Palmer	6	5	8
(South Africa) E Edwards (South Africa) D Visser	4	7	6
(Republic of Ireland) M Doyle (West Germany) W Popp	4	5
3	(United States) S Davis (United States) B Gilbert	6	7
(United States) M Bauer (South Africa) M Robertson	6	2
2	(United Kingdom) C Dowdeswell (South Africa) C van Rensburg	7	6

Semifinals
(Israel) A Mansdorf (Israel) S Perkiss	6	6
4	(United States) T Delatte (United States) M De Palmer	2	2
3	(United States) S Davis (United States) B Gilbert	6	6	2
2	(United Kingdom) C Dowdeswell (South Africa) C van Rensburg	7	3	6

Final
(Israel) A Mansdorf (Israel) S Perkiss	6	6^{5}	4
2	(United Kingdom) C Dowdeswell (South Africa) C van Rensburg	3	7^{7}	6
