= 1987 French Open – Mixed doubles =

Mixed doubles
- 1987 French Open

Final
- Champion: (Spain) Emilio Sánchez (United States) Pam Shriver
- Runner-up: (United States) Sherwood Stewart (United States) Lori McNeil
- Score: 6–3, 7–6^{(7-4)}

Details
- Draw: 56

Events
Singles	men	women		boys	girls
Doubles	men	women	mixed	boys	girls
WC Singles	men	women	quad
WC Doubles	men	women	quad
Legends	−45	45+	women
- French Open

The mixed doubles tournament at the 1987 French Open was held from 25 May until 7 June 1987 on the outdoor clay courts at the Stade Roland Garros in Paris, France. Emilio Sánchez and Pam Shriver won the title, defeating Sherwood Stewart and Lori McNeil in the final.

== Draw ==
Key

- Q = Qualifier
- WC = Wild card
- LL = Lucky loser
- Alt = Alternate
- ITF = ITF entry
- PR = Protected ranking
- SR = Special ranking
- SE = Special exempt
- JE = Junior exempt
- JR = Junior Accelerator Programme entrant
- CO = College Accelerator Programme entrant
- NG = Next Gen Accelerator Program entrant
- w/o = Walkover
- r = Retired
- d = Defaulted

=== Finals ===
Quarterfinals
(Spain) Emilio Sánchez (United States) Pam Shriver	6	7
(Czechoslovakia) Pavel Složil (Peru) Laura Gildemeister	4	5
(Australia) Paul McNamee (United States) Martina Navratilova	4	6	4
(Denmark) Michael Mortensen (Denmark) Tine Scheuer-Larsen	6	1	6
(Australia) Mark Woodforde (Australia) Michelle Jaggard	5	6	3
(United States) Sherwood Stewart (United States) Lori McNeil	7	3	6
(Argentina) Gustavo Luza (Argentina) Patricia Tarabini	6	3	5
(Netherlands) Michiel Schapers (United States) Ann Henricksson	4	6	7

Semifinals
(Spain) Emilio Sánchez (United States) Pam Shriver	3	6	6
(Denmark) Michael Mortensen (Denmark) Tine Scheuer-Larsen	6	1	1
(United States) Sherwood Stewart (United States) Lori McNeil	6	7
(Netherlands) Michiel Schapers (United States) Ann Henricksson	4	5

Final
(Spain) Emilio Sánchez (United States) Pam Shriver	6	7
(United States) Sherwood Stewart (United States) Lori McNeil	3	6^{5}

=== Top half ===
==== Section 1 ====
First round
(Australia) T Roche (Australia) E Smylie	1	6	2
(Australia) D Cahill (Australia) N Provis	6	3	6
(United States) P Chamberlin (United States) B Gerken	2	6	6
(France) L Courteau (France) V Paquet	6	4	1
(Spain) T Carbonell (United States) MJ Fernández	3	4
(Australia) L Warder (West Germany) S Meier	6	6
(United States) T Warneke (United States) G Magers	7	2	7
(Brazil) D Campos (Czechoslovakia) R Maršíková	6	6	5
(United States) B Scanlon (United States) S Mascarin	6	4	6
(Czechoslovakia) J Kurz (Czechoslovakia) H Suková	4	6	4
(France) C Lesage (France) N Phan-Thanh	6	7
(Chile) P Rodríguez (Chile) N Rodríguez	3	6

Second round
(Spain) E Sánchez (United States) P Shriver	6	6
(Australia) D Cahill (Australia) N Provis	4	4
(United States) P Chamberlin (United States) B Gerken	4	6	6
(Australia) L Warder (West Germany) S Meier	6	4	3
(United States) T Warneke (United States) G Magers	7	7
(United States) B Scanlon (United States) S Mascarin	6	5
(France) C Lesage (France) N Phan-Thanh	3	1
(Czechoslovakia) P Složil (Peru) L Gildemeister	6	6

Third round
(Spain) E Sánchez (United States) P Shriver	6	6
(United States) P Chamberlin (United States) B Gerken	3	3
(United States) T Warneke (United States) G Magers	2	3
(Czechoslovakia) P Složil (Peru) L Gildemeister	6	6

Quarterfinals
(Spain) E Sánchez (United States) P Shriver	6	7
(Czechoslovakia) P Složil (Peru) L Gildemeister	4	5

==== Section 2 ====
First round
(France) É Winogradsky (France) N Herreman	2	3
(Sweden) J Svensson (Sweden) C Lindqvist	6	6
(Argentina) G Tiberti (Argentina) M Pérez Roldán	4	4
(Czechoslovakia) L Pimek (United States) J Kaplan	6	6
(Austria) H Skoff (Romania) V Ruzici	6	7
(United States) B Willenborg (United States) P Barg	3	5
(United States) R Baxter (Canada) J Hetherington	7	6
(France) J Potier (France) MC Calleja	6	3
(Australia) D Tyson (Australia) L Field	6	6
(Iran) M Bahrami (France) S Amiach	4	4
(France) P Kuchna (France) L Vanhille	1	0
(Chile) H Gildemeister (United States) L Bonder	6	6

Second round
(Australia) P McNamee (United States) M Navratilova	6	6
(Sweden) J Svensson (Sweden) C Lindqvist	2	2
(Czechoslovakia) L Pimek (United States) J Kaplan	2	2
(Austria) H Skoff (Romania) V Ruzici	6	6
(United States) R Baxter (Canada) J Hetherington	7	3	2
(Australia) D Tyson (Australia) L Field	6	6	6
(Chile) H Gildemeister (United States) L Bonder	0	3
(Denmark) M Mortensen (Denmark) T Scheuer-Larsen	6	6

Third round
(Australia) P McNamee (United States) M Navratilova	2	6	6
(Austria) H Skoff (Romania) V Ruzici	6	2	3
(Australia) D Tyson (Australia) L Field	2	2
(Denmark) M Mortensen (Denmark) T Scheuer-Larsen	6	6

Quarterfinals
(Australia) P McNamee (United States) M Navratilova	4	6	4
(Denmark) M Mortensen (Denmark) T Scheuer-Larsen	6	1	6

=== Bottom half ===
==== Section 3 ====
First round
(United States) T Witsken (United States) C Benjamin	6	6
(France) B Dadillon (France) F Martin	3	2
(Australia) M Woodforde (Australia) M Jaggard	6	6
(France) T Van Den Daele (France) K Quentrec	1	1
(Argentina) F Davin (Argentina) M Paz	3	2
(South Africa) M Robertson (Australia) D Balestrat	6	6
(United States) C Hooper (United States) M Werdel	5	6	6
(Brazil) I Kley (Brazil) N Dias	7	4	4
(Argentina) G Pérez Roldán (Switzerland) L Drescher	5	4
(Brazil) J Soares (Brazil) P Medrado	7	6
(United States) M Purcell (United States) P Smith	6	6
(Argentina) A Mancini (Argentina) A Tiezzi	4	3

Second round
(Australia) K Warwick (Australia) J Byrne	6	7
(United States) T Witsken (United States) C Benjamin	4	5
(Australia) M Woodforde (Australia) M Jaggard	6	3	6
(South Africa) M Robertson (Australia) D Balestrat	3	6	3
(United States) C Hooper (United States) M Werdel	6	6
(Brazil) J Soares (Brazil) P Medrado	3	4
(United States) M Purcell (United States) P Smith	4	6
(United States) S Stewart (United States) L McNeil	6	7

Third round
(Australia) K Warwick (Australia) J Byrne	4	7	6
(Australia) M Woodforde (Australia) M Jaggard	6	6^{5}	8
(United States) C Hooper (United States) M Werdel	5	0
(United States) S Stewart (United States) L McNeil	7	6

Quarterfinals
(Australia) M Woodforde (Australia) M Jaggard	5	6	3
(United States) S Stewart (United States) L McNeil	7	3	6

==== Section 4 ====
First round
(United States) B Levine (South Africa) E Reinach	6	6	6
(France) T Pham (France) C Suire	7	3	3
(France) A Boetsch (France) E Derly	7	6
(United States) B Buffington (United States) L Antonoplis	5	4
(Argentina) G Luza (Argentina) P Tarabini	5	6	6
(Spain) S Casal (Italy) R Reggi	7	2	3
(Netherlands) M Schapers (United States) A Henricksson	7	7
(Netherlands) T Nijssen (Netherlands) C Bakkum	5	6
(France) F Errard (France) N Housset	1	1
(Spain) J Sánchez (Spain) A Sánchez Vicario	6	6
(France) T Champion (France) S Niox-Château	3	6	2
(France) JP Fleurian (France) P Etchemendy	6	4	6

Second round
Alt	(France) C Freyss (France) M Laval	0	2
(United States) B Levine (South Africa) E Reinach	6	6
(France) A Boetsch (France) E Derly
(Argentina) G Luza (Argentina) P Tarabini	w/o
(Netherlands) M Schapers (United States) A Henricksson	6	6
(Spain) J Sánchez (Spain) A Sánchez Vicario	2	2
(France) JP Fleurian (France) P Etchemendy	3	6	4
(France) G Forget (United States) B Nagelsen	6	3	6

Third round
(United States) B Levine (South Africa) E Reinach	3	7	4
(Argentina) G Luza (Argentina) P Tarabini	6	5	6
(Netherlands) M Schapers (United States) A Henricksson	6	4	7
(France) G Forget (United States) B Nagelsen	2	6	5

Quarterfinals
(Argentina) G Luza (Argentina) P Tarabini	6	3	5
(Netherlands) M Schapers (United States) A Henricksson	4	6	7
