= Andrei Chesnokov =

Russian tennis player

Andrei Chesnokov Андрей Чесноков
- Country (sports): Soviet Union; Russia
- Born: 2 February 1966 (age 60) Moscow, Soviet Union
- Height: 1.87 m (6 ft 2 in)
- Turned pro: 1985
- Retired: 1999
- Plays: Right-handed (two-handed backhand)
- Prize money: $3,084,188

Singles
- Career record: 344–259 (57.4%)
- Career titles: 7
- Highest ranking: No. 9 (8 April 1991)

Grand Slam singles results
- Australian Open: QF (1988)
- French Open: SF (1989)
- Wimbledon: 1R (1986, 1988, 1989, 1992, 1993, 1995, 1996)
- US Open: 4R (1986, 1987, 1989)

Doubles
- Career record: 7–21
- Career titles: 0
- Highest ranking: No. 342 (12 October 1992)

Andrei Eduardovich Chesnokov (Russian: Андрей Эдуардович Чесноков; born 2 February 1966) is a former professional tennis player from Russia.

== Career ==
Chesnokov's highest singles ranking was World No. 9 in 1991. The biggest tournament victories of his career came at the Monte Carlo Open in 1990, and at the Canadian Open in 1991 (both Tennis Masters Series events).

Chesnokov's best performance at a Grand Slam event came at the French Open in 1989, where he reached the semi-finals by eliminating Pablo Arraya, Jonas Svensson, Carl-Uwe Steeb, Jim Courier and the defending champion Mats Wilander in straight sets in the quarterfinals. He was eliminated by the eventual champion Michael Chang in four sets.

The most famous match in Chesnokov's career took place on 24 September 1995 in the semi-final of the 1995 Davis Cup against Germany. In the fifth set of the final deciding match of the semi-final, playing against Michael Stich, Chesnokov saved nine match points before emerging the winner, the final score being: 6–4, 1–6, 1–6, 6–3, 14–12. The next day President of Russia Boris Yeltsin awarded Chesnokov with Order of Courage.

During his career, Chesnokov won seven top-level singles titles and earned prize-money totalling US$3,084,188. He retired from the professional tour in 1999, even if the last full year on tour was 1995 and from 1996 on he played only a few tournaments.

On 20 November 2005, during a visit to Dnipropetrovsk (Ukraine), he was shot twice with rubber bullets after a quarrel in a restaurant with two unidentified men.

As a sixteen-year-old Chesnokov was one of those present at the UEFA Cup match between FC Spartak Moscow and HFC Haarlem during which the Luzhniki disaster happened. He was an honorary member of the committee that organized a benefit match for the victims between Spartak Moscow and Haarlem, that took place on October 20, 2007.

In 2013, Chesnokov, whose mother was Jewish, who carried the last name Litvinova, celebrated his bar mitzvah in France.

Chesnokov was coaching Elena Vesnina.

== Legacy ==
Chesnokov has always been outspoken about the Soviet system as a crucial reason for his less triumphant career. In February 2021, considering the fact of a higher level of availability of tennis to the general audience of citizens in the USSR, if compared to modern Russia, he stated: "Formally it was more available. But we had nothing. No balls, no racquets, no tennis shoes. You could count indoor courts on one hand. As a teenager, I could train on the court only 3 hours a week, and in winter I played mostly hockey. I think, if I was not born in the USSR I would have achieved more in tennis." In September 2021, he continued by declaring there was absolutely nothing good in the Soviet rule.

== Career finals ==
=== Singles (7 titles, 8 runners-up) ===
Legend
Grand Slam (0-0)
Tennis Masters Cup (0-0)
ATP Masters Series (2-3)
ATP Tour (5-7)

| Result | W/L | Date | Tournament | Surface | Opponent | Score |
|---|---|---|---|---|---|---|
| Win | 1–0 | May 1987 | Florence, Italy | Clay | (Italy) Alessandro de Minicis | 6–1, 6–3 |
| Loss | 1–1 | Jan 1988 | Wellington, New Zealand | Hard | (India) Ramesh Krishnan | 7–6^{(9–7)}, 0–6, 4–6, 3–6 |
| Loss | 1–2 | Jan 1988 | Sydney, Australia | Grass | (Australia) John Fitzgerald | 3–6, 4–6 |
| Win | 2–2 | Mar 1988 | Orlando, U.S. | Hard | (Czechoslovakia) Miloslav Mečíř | 7–6^{(8–6)}, 6–1 |
| Loss | 2–3 | Oct 1988 | Toulouse, France | Hard (i) | (United States) Jimmy Connors | 2–6, 0–6 |
| Win | 3–3 | Apr 1989 | Nice, France | Clay | (France) Jérôme Potier | 6–4, 6–4 |
| Win | 4–3 | May 1989 | Munich, West Germany | Clay | (Czechoslovakia) Martin Střelba | 5–7, 7–6^{(8–6)}, 6–2 |
| Loss | 4–4 | Jan 1990 | Auckland, New Zealand | Hard | (United States) Scott Davis | 6–4, 3–6, 3–6 |
| Win | 5–4 | Apr 1990 | Monte Carlo, Monaco | Clay | (Austria) Thomas Muster | 7–5, 6–3, 6–3 |
| Loss | 5–5 | May 1990 | Rome, Italy | Clay | (Austria) Thomas Muster | 1–6, 3–6, 1–6 |
| Win | 6–5 | Oct 1990 | Tel Aviv, Israel | Hard | (Israel) Amos Mansdorf | 6–4, 6–3 |
| Win | 7–5 | Jul 1991 | Montreal, Canada | Hard | (Czechoslovakia) Petr Korda | 3–6, 6–4, 6–3 |
| Loss | 7–6 | Mar 1992 | Indian Wells, U.S. | Hard | (United States) Michael Chang | 3–6, 4–6, 5–7 |
| Loss | 7–7 | May 1993 | Hamburg, Germany | Clay | (Germany) Michael Stich | 3–6, 7–6^{(7–1)}, 6–7^{(7–9)}, 4–6 |
| Loss | 7–8 | Aug 1993 | Prague, Czech republic | Clay | (Spain) Sergi Bruguera | 5–7, 4–6 |

== Performance timelines ==
Key
| W | F | SF | QF | #R | RR | Q# | P# | DNQ | A | Z# | PO | G | S | B | NMS | NTI | P | NH |

(W) winner; (F) finalist; (SF) semifinalist; (QF) quarterfinalist; (#R) rounds 4, 3, 2, 1; (RR) round-robin stage; (Q#) qualification round; (P#) preliminary round; (DNQ) did not qualify; (A) absent; (Z#) Davis/Fed Cup Zonal Group (with number indication) or (PO) play-off; (G) gold, (S) silver or (B) bronze Olympic/Paralympic medal; (NMS) not a Masters tournament; (NTI) not a Tier I tournament; (P) postponed; (NH) not held; (SR) strike rate (events won / competed); (W–L) win–loss record.

=== Singles ===
| Tournament | 1984 | 1985 | 1986 | 1987 | 1988 | 1989 | 1990 | 1991 | 1992 | 1993 | 1994 | 1995 | 1996 | 1997 | 1998 | 1999 | 2000 | SR | W–L |
|---|---|---|---|---|---|---|---|---|---|---|---|---|---|---|---|---|---|---|---|
Grand Slam tournaments
| Australian Open | A | 1R | A | A | QF | A | 2R | 1R | 4R | 2R | 1R | A | 1R | 1R | A | A | A | 0 / 9 | 9–9 |
| French Open | A | 3R | QF | 3R | QF | SF | 4R | 3R | 1R | 2R | 1R | 4R | 1R | A | 1R | A | A | 0 / 13 | 26–13 |
| Wimbledon | A | A | 1R | A | 1R | 1R | A | A | 1R | 1R | A | 1R | 1R | A | A | A | A | 0 / 7 | 0–7 |
| US Open | A | A | 4R | 4R | A | 4R | 3R | 2R | 2R | 1R | 2R | 2R | 1R | A | A | A | A | 0 / 10 | 15–10 |
| Win–loss | 0–0 | 2–2 | 7–3 | 5–2 | 8–3 | 8–3 | 6–3 | 3–3 | 4–4 | 2–4 | 1–3 | 4–3 | 0–4 | 0–1 | 0–1 | 0–0 | 0–0 | 0 / 39 | 50–39 |
ATP Masters Series
| Indian Wells | A | A | A | 1R | A | 3R | 1R | A | F | 1R | 2R | 1R | A | A | A | A | A | 0 / 7 | 8–7 |
| Miami | A | A | A | 2R | QF | 2R | 2R | A | 2R | 3R | 3R | A | A | A | A | A | A | 0 / 7 | 8–7 |
| Monte Carlo | A | A | A | QF | 3R | 2R | W | QF | QF | 2R | 2R | 1R | A | A | A | A | A | 1 / 9 | 17–8 |
| Rome | A | A | 3R | 1R | A | A | F | A | A | QF | 3R | 2R | A | A | A | A | A | 0 / 6 | 13–6 |
| Hamburg | A | A | A | 2R | A | 1R | A | 1R | A | F | 3R | 1R | A | A | A | A | A | 0 / 6 | 8–6 |
| Canada | A | A | A | A | A | A | A | W | A | A | A | A | A | A | A | A | A | 1 / 1 | 6–0 |
| Cincinnati | A | A | A | A | 2R | 2R | 2R | 1R | A | A | A | 1R | 1R | A | A | A | A | 0 / 6 | 3–6 |
| Stockholm/Essen/Stuttgart | A | A | A | A | A | A | 3R | A | 2R | 1R | 3R | A | A | A | A | A | A | 0 / 4 | 5–4 |
| Paris | A | A | A | 1R | QF | 1R | 2R | 1R | 2R | 2R | 1R | A | A | A | A | A | A | 0 / 8 | 4–8 |
| Win–loss | 0–0 | 0–0 | 2–1 | 5–6 | 8–4 | 4–6 | 13–6 | 8–4 | 10–5 | 12–7 | 8–7 | 1–5 | 0–1 | 0–0 | 0–0 | 0–0 | 0–0 | 2 / 53 | 70–51 |
| Year-end ranking | 289 | 137 | 36 | 52 | 14 | 22 | 12 | 31 | 30 | 27 | 32 | 89 | 85 | 209 | 494 | 871 | 715 | | |

== 1986 Goodwill Games singles matches ==
1986 Goodwill Games
| Round | Opponent | Result | Score |
| 1R | Bye | — | — |
| 2R | (Greece) Konstantinos Glavas | Win | 6–0, 6–0 |
| 3R | (United States) Bobby Blair | Win | 6–4, 6–2 |
| QF | (Soviet Union) Sergey Leonyuk | Win | 6–1, 6–1 |
| SF | (United States) Brad Pearce | Win | 6–1, 7–5 |
| F | (Czechoslovakia) Marián Vajda | Win | 6–3, 6–2, 6–4 |
