= Vanhille =

Vanhille is a surname. Notable people with the surname include:

- Louise Vanhille (born 1998), French gymnast
- Lydie Vanhille (born 1967), French tennis player
