= 1987 French Open – Men's doubles =

Men's doubles
- 1987 French Open

Final
- Champion: (Sweden) Anders Järryd (United States) Robert Seguso
- Runner-up: (France) Guy Forget (France) Yannick Noah
- Score: 6–7, 6–7, 6–3, 6–4, 6–2

Details
- Draw: 64
- Seeds: 16

Events
Singles	men	women		boys	girls
Doubles	men	women	mixed	boys	girls
WC Singles	men	women	quad
WC Doubles	men	women	quad
Legends	−45	45+	women
- French Open

Anders Järryd and Robert Seguso defeated Guy Forget and Yannick Noah for the 1987 French Open men's doubles title.

John Fitzgerald and Tomáš Šmíd were the defending champions, but lost in the first round to Arnaud Boetsch and Loïc Courteau, 7–6, 6–4.

== Seeds ==
1. (France) Guy Forget / (France) Yannick Noah (finals)
2. (United States) Paul Annacone / (South Africa) Christo van Rensburg (second round)
3. (Sweden) Anders Järryd / (United States) Robert Seguso (champions)
4. (Chile) Hans Gildemeister / (Ecuador) Andrés Gómez (third round)
5. (United States) Gary Donnelly / (United States) Peter Fleming (semifinals)
6. (Sweden) Joakim Nyström / (Sweden) Mats Wilander (quarterfinals)
7. (Spain) Sergio Casal / (Spain) Emilio Sánchez (second round)
8. (Australia) John Fitzgerald / (Czechoslovakia) Tomáš Šmíd (Defending Champions, First round)
9. (United States) Chip Hooper / (United States) Mike Leach (second round)
10. (United States) Sherwood Stewart / (Australia) Kim Warwick (quarterfinals)
11. (United States) Scott Davis / (United States) Mike De Palmer (first round)
12. (Switzerland) Claudio Mezzadri / (United States) Jim Pugh (first round)
13. (Australia) Laurie Warder / (United States) Blaine Willenborg (quarterfinals)
14. (Switzerland) Heinz Günthardt / (Switzerland) Jakob Hlasek (first round)
15. (Iran) Mansour Bahrami / (Uruguay) Diego Pérez (third round)
16. (Italy) Paolo Canè / (Italy) Gianni Ocleppo (first round)

== Draw ==
=== Finals ===
Quarterfinals
1	(France) Guy Forget (France) Yannick Noah	6	6
10	(United States) Sherwood Stewart (Australia) Kim Warwick	2	4
13	(Australia) Laurie Warder (United States) Blaine Willenborg	3	6
5	(United States) Gary Donnelly (United States) Peter Fleming	6	7
6	(Sweden) Joakim Nyström (Sweden) Mats Wilander	3	0
3	(Sweden) Anders Järryd (United States) Robert Seguso	6	6
(Spain) José López-Maeso (Spain) Alberto Tous	6	6
(Czechoslovakia) Stanislav Birner (Czechoslovakia) Jaroslav Navrátil	2	4

Semifinals
1	(France) Guy Forget (France) Yannick Noah	2	6	6	6
5	(United States) Gary Donnelly (United States) Peter Fleming	6	1	4	4
3	(Sweden) Anders Järryd (United States) Robert Seguso	4	6	5	6	6
(Spain) José López-Maeso (Spain) Alberto Tous	6	1	7	2	3

Finals
1	(France) Guy Forget (France) Yannick Noah	7	7	3	4	2
3	(Sweden) Anders Järryd (United States) Robert Seguso	6	6	6	6	6

=== Top half ===
==== Section 1 ====
First round
1	(France) G Forget (France) Y Noah	6	6
(Australia) D Tyson (Netherlands) H Van Boeckel	4	3
(France) JP Fleurian (France) E Winogradsky	6	6
(Chile) R Acuña (United States) H Pfister	4	1
(Spain) J Arrese (Spain) D De Miguel-Lapiedra	2	6	8
(Brazil) D Campos (Italy) S Colombo	6	4	6
(West Germany) T Meinecke (West Germany) R Osterthun	6	6
16	(Italy) P Canè (Italy) G Ocleppo	3	2
10	(United States) S Stewart (Australia) K Warwick	6	6
(France) T Benhabiles (Peru) C Di Laura	0	2
(United States) R Baxter (United States) P Chamberlin	6	4	6
WC	(France) T Pham (France) T Tulasne	1	6	3
(Australia) D Cahill (Australia) A Kratzmann	6	6
(United States) M Bauer (Poland) W Fibak	4	1
(Netherlands) T Nijssen (Netherlands) J Vekemans	3	4
7	(Spain) S Casal (Spain) E Sánchez	6	6

Second round
1	(France) G Forget (France) Y Noah	7	7
(France) JP Fleurian (France) E Winogradsky	6	6
(Spain) J Arrese (Spain) D De Miguel-Lapiedra	1	2
(West Germany) T Meinecke (West Germany) R Osterthun	6	6
10	(United States) S Stewart (Australia) K Warwick	1	6	6
(United States) R Baxter (United States) P Chamberlin	6	3	4
(Australia) D Cahill (Australia) A Kratzmann	7	4	12
7	(Spain) S Casal (Spain) E Sánchez	5	6	10

Third round
1	(France) G Forget (France) Y Noah	7	6
(West Germany) T Meinecke (West Germany) R Osterthun	5	3
10	(United States) S Stewart (Australia) K Warwick	6	6
(Australia) D Cahill (Australia) A Kratzmann	2	3

Quarterfinals
1	(France) G Forget (France) Y Noah	6	6
12	(United States) S Stewart (Australia) K Warwick	2	4

==== Section 2 ====
First round
4	(Chile) H Gildemeister (Ecuador) A Gómez	6	6
(West Germany) A Maurer (United States) M Purcell	3	2
(United States) B Scanlon (West Germany) CU Steeb	6	6
(Australia) P McNamara (Australia) P McNamee	3	4
(United States) M Freeman (United States) T Witsken	4	6	6
(Australia) R Barlow (Nigeria) T Mmoh	6	0	0
(Argentina) G Luza (Argentina) G Tiberti	5	3
13	(Australia) L Warder (United States) B Willenborg	7	6
11	(United States) S Davis (United States) M De Palmer	6	3	2
(United States) J Arias (United States) E Korita	3	6	6
WC	(France) T Champion (France) O Delaître	7	3	1
WC	(Spain) T Carbonell (Spain) J Sánchez	6	6	6
(United States) M Basham (United States) B Buffington	7	3	2
(Australia) C Limberger (Australia) M Woodforde	6	6	6
(Denmark) M Mortensen (United States) T Nelson	6	3	5
5	(United States) G Donnelly (United States) P Fleming	4	6	7

Second round
4	(Chile) H Gildemeister (Ecuador) A Gómez	6	6
(United States) B Scanlon (West Germany) CU Steeb	4	4
(United States) M Freeman (United States) T Witsken	0	4
13	(Australia) L Warder (United States) B Willenborg	6	6
(United States) J Arias (United States) E Korita	7	6
WC	(Spain) T Carbonell (Spain) J Sánchez	5	2
(Australia) C Limberger (Australia) M Woodforde	3	4
5	(United States) G Donnelly (United States) P Fleming	6	6

Third round
4	(Chile) H Gildemeister (Ecuador) A Gómez	6	4	5
13	(Australia) L Warder (United States) B Willenborg	3	6	7
(United States) J Arias (United States) E Korita	6	2	5
5	(United States) G Donnelly (United States) P Fleming	4	6	7

Quarterfinals
13	(Australia) L Warder (United States) B Willenborg	3	6
5	(United States) G Donnelly (United States) P Fleming	6	7

=== Bottom half ===
==== Section 3 ====
First round
6	(Sweden) J Nyström (Sweden) M Wilander	6	4	6
(Denmark) M Christensen (Sweden) LA Wahlgren	1	6	0
(United States) M Anger (United States) G Holmes	4	4
(Brazil) I Kley (Brazil) J Soares	6	6
(United States) B Gilbert (United States) V Van Patten	1	7	6
(United States) M Dickson (United States) L Scott	6	6	4
(Netherlands) M Schapers (Czechoslovakia) M Šrejber	6	6
12	(Switzerland) C Mezzadri (United States) J Pugh	1	2
14	(Switzerland) H Günthardt (Switzerland) J Hlasek	0	6	2
(United Kingdom) J Bates (United Kingdom) A Castle	6	4	6
(United States) B Levine (United States) S Giammalva	3	2
(New Zealand) K Evernden (Australia) W Masur	6	6
(Israel) G Bloom (Czechoslovakia) C Suk	6	6
(Sweden) R Båthman (Sweden) P Lundgren	3	4
(Australia) D MacPherson (Australia) S Youl	2	7	0
3	(Sweden) A Järryd (United States) R Seguso	6	6	6

Second round
6	(Sweden) J Nyström (Sweden) M Wilander	6	6
(Brazil) I Kley (Brazil) J Soares	1	0
(United States) B Gilbert (United States) V Van Patten	2	7	3
(Netherlands) M Schapers (Czechoslovakia) M Šrejber	6	5	6
(United Kingdom) J Bates (United Kingdom) A Castle	6	7	6
(New Zealand) K Evernden (Australia) W Masur	7	6	4
(Israel) G Bloom (Czechoslovakia) C Suk	2	7	2
3	(Sweden) A Järryd (United States) R Seguso	6	6	6

Third round
6	(Sweden) J Nyström (Sweden) M Wilander	7	6
(Netherlands) M Schapers (Czechoslovakia) M Šrejber	6	3
(United Kingdom) J Bates (United Kingdom) A Castle	6	3
3	(Sweden) A Järryd (United States) R Seguso	7	6

Quarterfinals
6	(Sweden) J Nyström (Sweden) M Wilander	3	0
3	(Sweden) A Järryd (United States) R Seguso	6	6

==== Section 4 ====
First round
8	(Australia) J Fitzgerald (Czechoslovakia) T Šmíd	6	4
(France) A Boetsch (France) L Courteau	7	6
(United States) G Layendecker (Canada) G Michibata	5	5
(Puerto Rico) J Rive (United States) D Tarr	7	7
(Spain) J López-Maeso (Spain) A Tous	7	7
WC	(United States) A Krickstein (Peru) J Yzaga	6	6
(Brazil) L Mattar (Brazil) C Motta	6	1	4
9	(United States) C Hooper (United States) M Leach	4	6	6
15	(Iran) M Bahrami (Uruguay) D Pérez	6	4	6
(Denmark) P Bastiansen (Denmark) M Tauson	4	6	0
(Czechoslovakia) P Korda (Czechoslovakia) P Složil	4	4
(Sweden) J Gunnarson (Sweden) J Svensson	6	6
(Czechoslovakia) S Birner (Czechoslovakia) J Navrátil	6	2	6
(South Africa) M Robertson (United States) T Warneke	1	6	4
(West Germany) E Jelen (West Germany) P Kühnen	2	3
2	(United States) P Annacone (South Africa) C van Rensburg	6	6

Second round
(France) A Boetsch (France) L Courteau	6	7
(Puerto Rico) J Rive (United States) D Tarr	1	5
(Spain) J López-Maeso (Spain) A Tous	6	5
9	(United States) C Hooper (United States) M Leach	4	4	r
15	(Iran) M Bahrami (Uruguay) D Pérez	2	6	6
(Sweden) J Gunnarson (Sweden) J Svensson	6	3	4
(Czechoslovakia) S Birner (Czechoslovakia) J Navrátil	6	4
2	(United States) P Annacone (South Africa) C van Rensburg	3	3	r

Third round
(Puerto Rico) J Rive (United States) D Tarr	5	3
(Spain) J López-Maeso (Spain) A Tous	7	6
15	(Iran) M Bahrami (Uruguay) D Pérez	1	5
(Czechoslovakia) S Birner (Czechoslovakia) J Navrátil	6	7

Quarterfinals
(Spain) J López-Maeso (Spain) A Tous	6	6
(Czechoslovakia) S Birner (Czechoslovakia) J Navrátil	2	4
