= 1986 South African Open (tennis) =

- Date: 17–23 November
- Edition: 83rd
- Category: Grand Prix
- Draw: 32S / 16D
- Prize money: $220,000
- Surface: Hard / outdoor
- Location: Johannesburg, South Africa

Champions

Singles
- (Israel) Amos Mansdorf

Doubles
- (United States) Mike De Palmer / (South Africa) Christo van Rensburg
- South African Open

The 1986 South African Open, also known as Altech Open for sponsorship reasons, was a men's tennis tournament played on outdoor hard courts in Johannesburg, South Africa that was part of the 1986 Nabisco Grand Prix. It was the 83rd edition of the tournament and was held from 17 through 23 November 1986. Unseeded Amos Mansdorf won the singles title.

== Finals ==
=== Singles ===
(Israel) Amos Mansdorf defeated (United States) Matt Anger 6–3, 3–6, 6–2, 7–5

- It was Mansdorf's only singles title of the year and the 1st of his career.

=== Doubles ===
(United States) Mike De Palmer / (South Africa) Christo van Rensburg defeated (Ecuador) Andrés Gómez / (United States) Sherwood Stewart 3–6, 6–2, 7–6^{(7–4)}

- It was De Palmer's 3rd and last doubles title of the year and the 5th of his career. It was Van Rensburg only doubles title of the year and the 8th of his career.
