= 1985 South African Open (tennis) =

- Date: 7–13 October
- Edition: 82nd
- Category: Grand Prix
- Draw: 32S / 16D
- Prize money: $210,000
- Surface: Hard / outdoor
- Location: Johannesburg, South Africa
- Venue: Ellis Park Tennis Stadium

Champions

Singles
- (United States) Matt Anger

Doubles
- (United Kingdom) Colin Dowdeswell / (South Africa) Christo van Rensburg
- South African Open

The 1985 South African Open (also known as the 1985 Altech South African Open for sponsorship reasons) was a men's tennis tournament played on outdoor hard courts in Johannesburg, [South Africa that was part of the 1985 Nabisco Grand Prix. It was the 82nd edition of the tournament and was held from 7 through 13 October 1985. Unseeded Matt Anger won the singles title.

== Finals ==
=== Singles ===
(United States) Matt Anger defeated (United States) Brad Gilbert 6–4, 3–6, 6–3, 6–2

- It was Anger's only singles title of his career.

=== Doubles ===
(United Kingdom) Colin Dowdeswell / (South Africa) Christo van Rensburg defeated (Israel) Amos Mansdorf / (Israel) Shahar Perkiss 3–6, 7–6^{(7–5)}, 6–4
