= 1986 U.S. Pro Tennis Championships =

- Date: July 21–27
- Edition: 59th
- Category: Grand Prix
- Draw: 56S / 28D
- Prize money: $220,000
- Surface: Clay / outdoor
- Location: Chestnut Hill, Massachusetts
- Venue: Longwood Cricket Club

Champions

Singles
- (Ecuador) Andrés Gómez

Doubles
- (Chile) Hans Gildemeister / (Ecuador) Andrés Gómez
- U.S. Pro Tennis Championships

The 1986 U.S. Pro Tennis Championships was a men's tennis tournament played on outdoor green clay courts at the Longwood Cricket Club in Chestnut Hill, Massachusetts in the United States. The event was part of the Super Series of the 1986 Nabisco Grand Prix circuit. It was the 59th edition of the tournament and was held from July 21 through July 27, 1986. First-seeded Andrés Gómez won the singles title.

== Finals ==
=== Singles ===
(Ecuador) Andrés Gómez defeated (Argentina) Martín Jaite 7–5, 6–4

- It was Gómez' 3rd singles title of the year and the 13th of his career.

=== Doubles ===
(Chile) Hans Gildemeister / (Ecuador) Andrés Gómez defeated (United States) Dan Cassidy / (United States) Mel Purcell 4–6, 7–5, 6–0
