= 1985 South African Open – Singles =

Singles
- 1985 South African Open

Final
- Champion: (United States) Matt Anger
- Runner-up: (United States) Brad Gilbert
- Score: 6–4, 3–6, 6–3, 6–2

Details
- Draw: 32 (3WC/4Q)
- Seeds: 8

Events
Singles	Doubles
- South African Open

Eliot Teltscher was the defending champion, but missed the remainder of the season due to an injury.

Matt Anger won the title by defeating Brad Gilbert 6–4, 3–6, 6–3, 6–2 in the final.

== Seeds ==
1. (United States) Kevin Curren (quarterfinals)
2. (United States) Johan Kriek (semifinals)
3. (United States) Scott Davis (first round)
4. (United States) Brad Gilbert (final)
5. (United States) Jimmy Arias (semifinals)
6. (United States) Larry Stefanki (first round)
7. (United States) Vitas Gerulaitis (first round)
8. (United States) John Sadri (quarterfinals)

== Draw ==
Key

- Q = Qualifier
- WC = Wild card
- LL = Lucky loser
- Alt = Alternate
- ITF = ITF entry
- PR = Protected ranking
- SR = Special ranking
- SE = Special exempt
- JE = Junior exempt
- JR = Junior Accelerator Programme entrant
- CO = College Accelerator Programme entrant
- NG = Next Gen Accelerator Program entrant
- w/o = Walkover
- r = Retired
- d = Defaulted

=== Finals ===
Semifinals
5	(United States) Jimmy Arias	5	6	5
(United States) Matt Anger	7	4	7
4	(United States) Brad Gilbert	6	6
2	(United States) Johan Kriek	4	4

Final
(United States) Matt Anger	6	3	6	6
4	(United States) Brad Gilbert	4	6	3	2

=== Top half ===
First round
1/WC	(United States) K Curren	6	6
(West Germany) T Meinecke	1	2
(Spain) J Avendaño	0	3
WC	(South Africa) C Steyn	6	6
(Republic of Ireland) M Doyle	6	6
(United Kingdom) C Dowdeswell	4	1
WC	(South Africa) C van Rensburg	7	6	2
5	(United States) J Arias	6	7	6
3	(United States) S Davis	3	4
(United States) M Anger	6	6
(United States) H Solomon	6	3	6
(United States) J Lapidus	4	6	3
(United Kingdom) J Bates	3	6	4
(South Africa) D Visser	6	3	6
(Israel) A Mansdorf	6	3	6
8	(United States) J Sadri	4	6	8

Second round
1/WC	(United States) K Curren	6	6	11
WC	(South Africa) C Steyn	7	2	9
(Republic of Ireland) M Doyle	4	6	7
5	(United States) J Arias	6	2	9
(United States) M Anger	6	6
(United States) H Solomon	2	1
(South Africa) D Visser	6	6
8	(United States) J Sadri	7	7

Quarterfinals
1/WC	(United States) K Curren	4	3
5	(United States) J Arias	6	6
(United States) M Anger	4	6	6
8	(United States) J Sadri	6	2	4

Semifinals
5	(United States) J Arias	5	6	5
(United States) M Anger	7	4	7

=== Bottom half ===
First round
6	(United States) L Stefanki	4	2
(Canada) M Wostenholme	6	6
Q	(South Africa) E Edwards	4	4
(United Kingdom) S Shaw	6	6
(United States) M Bauer	6	6	3
Q	(South Africa) B Moir	7	4	6
(United States) B Green	2	6
4	(United States) B Gilbert	6	7
7	(United States) V Gerulaitis	3	4
(United States) M De Palmer	6	6
Q	(South Africa) B Pirow	6	6
Q	(South Africa) K Moir	3	1
(West Germany) W Popp	6	6	5
(Israel) S Perkiss	3	7	7
(Argentina) R Saad	2	0^{r}
2	(United States) J Kriek	6	1

Second round
(Canada) M Wostenholme	5	7	6
(United Kingdom) S Shaw	7	5	2
Q	(South Africa) B Moir	3	7	3
4	(United States) B Gilbert	6	5	6
(United States) M De Palmer	6	7
Q	(South Africa) B Pirow	3	6
(Israel) S Perkiss	3	5
2	(United States) J Kriek	6	7

Quarterfinals
(Canada) M Wostenholme	4	2
4	(United States) B Gilbert	6	6
(United States) M De Palmer	6	3	1
2	(United States) J Kriek	4	6	6

Semifinals
4	(United States) B Gilbert	6	6
2	(United States) J Kriek	4	4
