= Lydie Vanhille =

French tennis player

- Country (sports): France
- Born: 23 April 1967 (age 57)

Singles
- Highest ranking: No. 231 (8 Jun 1987)

Grand Slam singles results
- French Open: 2R (1987)

Doubles
- Highest ranking: No. 331 (14 Sep 1987)

Grand Slam mixed doubles results
- French Open: 1R (1987)

Lydie Vanhille (born 23 April 1967) is a French former professional tennis player.

Vanhille, who had a best singles world ranking of 231, featured as a wildcard in the singles main draw of the 1987 French Open. She won her first round match over Alexia Dechaume, then lost in the second round to Petra Huber.
