= 1987 French Open – Women's singles =

Women's singles
- 1987 French Open

Final
- Champion: (West Germany) Steffi Graf
- Runner-up: (United States) Martina Navratilova
- Score: 6–4, 4–6, 8–6

Details
- Seeds: 16

Events
Singles	men	women		boys	girls
Doubles	men	women	mixed	boys	girls
WC Singles	men	women	quad
WC Doubles	men	women	quad
Legends	−45	45+	women
← 1986 ·	French Open	· 1988 →

Steffi Graf defeated Martina Navratilova in the final, 6–4, 4–6, 8–6 to win the women's singles tennis title at the 1987 French Open. It was her first major singles title, and the first of an eventual 22 such titles.

Chris Evert was the two-time defending champion, but was defeated by Navratilova in the semifinals in a rematch of the previous three years' finals.

This tournament marked the major debut for future world No. 1 and French Open champion Arantxa Sánchez Vicario.

== Seeds ==
1. (United States) Martina Navratilova (final)
2. (West Germany) Steffi Graf (champion)
3. (United States) Chris Evert (semifinals)
4. (Czechoslovakia) Hana Mandlíková (second round)
5. (Czechoslovakia) Helena Suková (fourth round)
6. (Bulgaria) Manuela Maleeva-Fragnière (quarterfinals)
7. (Argentina) Gabriela Sabatini (semifinals)
8. (West Germany) Claudia Kohde-Kilsch (quarterfinals)
9. (United States) Lori McNeil (first round)
10. (United States) Kathy Rinaldi (third round)
11. (Sweden) Catarina Lindqvist (second round)
12. (Bulgaria) Katerina Maleeva (fourth round)
13. (United States) Mary Joe Fernández (second round)
14. (Italy) Raffaella Reggi (quarterfinals)
15. (West Germany) Sylvia Hanika (fourth round)
16. (United States) Melissa Gurney (first round)

== Draw ==
=== Key ===
- Q = Qualifier
- WC = Wild card
- LL = Lucky loser
- Alt = Alternate
- ITF = ITF entry
- PR = Protected ranking
- SR = Special ranking
- SE = Special exempt
- JE = Junior exempt
- JR = Junior Accelerator Programme entrant
- CO = College Accelerator Programme entrant
- NG = Next Gen Accelerator Program entrant
- w/o = Walkover
- r = Retired
- d = Defaulted

=== Finals ===
Quarterfinals
1	(United States) Martina Navratilova	6	6
8	(West Germany) Claudia Kohde-Kilsch	1	2
3	(United States) Chris Evert	6	6
14	(Italy) Raffaella Reggi	2	2
7	(Argentina) Gabriela Sabatini	6	6
(Spain) Arantxa Sánchez Vicario	4	0
6	(Bulgaria) Manuela Maleeva-Fragnière	4	1
2	(West Germany) Steffi Graf	6	6

Semifinals
1	(United States) Martina Navratilova	6	6
3	(United States) Chris Evert	2	2
7	(Argentina) Gabriela Sabatini	4	6	5
2	(West Germany) Steffi Graf	6	4	7

Final
1	(United States) Martina Navratilova	4	6	6
2	(West Germany) Steffi Graf	6	4	8

=== Top half ===
==== Section 1 ====
First round
1	(United States) M Navratilova	6	7^{9}
(France) C Tanvier	3	6^{7}
(Argentina) A Villagrán	6	6
(United States) J Mundel	0	4
WC	(France) A Dechaume	3	6	3
WC	(France) L Vanhille	6	1	6
(Austria) P Huber	7	7
(United States) G Kim	5	5
(Netherlands) M Bollegraf	6	6
(Netherlands) N Jagerman	3	3
(Italy) L Garrone	6	6
(United States) A-M Fernandez	1	2
(Switzerland) L Drescher	6	0	1
(Argentina) M Pérez Roldán	0	6	6
(Brazil) N Dias	2	1
15	(West Germany) S Hanika	6	6

Second round
1	(United States) M Navratilova	6	2	6
(Argentina) A Villagrán	0	6	2
WC	(France) L Vanhille	3	1
(Austria) P Huber	6	6
(Netherlands) M Bollegraf	4	6	3
(Italy) L Garrone	6	2	6
(Argentina) M Pérez Roldán	2	4
15	(West Germany) S Hanika	6	6

Third round
1	(United States) M Navratilova	6	6
(Austria) P Huber	1	1
(Italy) L Garrone	4	3
15	(West Germany) S Hanika	6	6

Fourth round
1	(United States) M Navratilova	6	6
15	(West Germany) S Hanika	0	2

==== Section 2 ====
First round
10	(United States) K Rinaldi	6	6
(United States) V Nelson-Dunbar	2	1
(France) J Halard	5	7^{7}	6
Q	(Czechoslovakia) H Fukárková	7	6^{5}	2
(West Germany) I Cueto	6	6
(Brazil) P Medrado	3	2
(France) N Tauziat	7	3	6
(Australia) J Byrne	5	6	3
(Canada) C Bassett	6	6
(Japan) A Kijimuta	1	3
(Czechoslovakia) R Maršíková	4	6	6
(United States) B Bowes	6	3	2
Q	(Poland) I Kuczyńska	6	6
(United States) M Van Nostrand	1	3
(Hong Kong) P Hy	2	3
8	(West Germany) C Kohde-Kilsch	6	6

Second round
10	(United States) K Rinaldi	3	6	7
(France) J Halard	6	1	5
(West Germany) I Cueto	2	6	3
(France) N Tauziat	6	0	6
(Canada) C Bassett	6	6^{3}	6
(Czechoslovakia) R Maršíková	2	7^{7}	3
Q	(Poland) I Kuczyńska	2	2
8	(West Germany) C Kohde-Kilsch	6	6

Third round
10	(United States) K Rinaldi	1	3
(France) N Tauziat	6	6
(Canada) C Bassett	5	3
8	(West Germany) C Kohde-Kilsch	7	6

Fourth round
(France) N Tauziat	1	6	0
8	(West Germany) C Kohde-Kilsch	6	3	6

==== Section 3 ====
First round
3	(United States) C Evert	6	6
(West Germany) E Pfaff	1	3
(Argentina) P Tarabini	2	5
(France) I Demongeot	6	7
(Belgium) A Devries	4	4
(Switzerland) E Krapl	6	6
(Romania) V Ruzici	6	6
(Czechoslovakia) K Böhmová	3	2
WC	(France) S Niox-Château	2	6	6
WC	(France) E Derly	6	4	2
(United States) K Gompert	6^{4}	6	8
(South Africa) E Reinach	7^{7}	3	6
WC	(France) M-C Calleja	0	0
(Argentina) B Fulco	6	6
Q	(United States) P Barg	2	1
12	(Bulgaria) K Maleeva	6	6

Second round
3	(United States) C Evert	6	7
(France) I Demongeot	3	5
(Switzerland) E Krapl	7	5	6
(Romania) V Ruzici	5	7	4
WC	(France) S Niox-Château	4	3
(United States) K Gompert	6	6
(Argentina) B Fulco	3	6	4
12	(Bulgaria) K Maleeva	6	2	6

Third round
3	(United States) C Evert	6	6
(Switzerland) E Krapl	2	0
(United States) K Gompert	6^{6}	1
12	(Bulgaria) K Maleeva	7^{8}	6

Fourth round
3	(United States) C Evert	6	6
12	(Bulgaria) K Maleeva	3	1

==== Section 4 ====
First round
14	(Italy) R Reggi	6	6
LL	(West Germany) C Singer	4	1
(Peru) L Gildemeister	2	4
(United Kingdom) S Gomer	6	6
(West Germany) W Probst	3	0
(Australia) A Minter	6	6
(Japan) E Okagawa	2	1
(United States) S Sloane	6	6
WC	(France) C Suire	3	7	6
WC	(France) P Etchemendy	6	5	1
(Soviet Union) N Zvereva	6	6
(Netherlands) M Mesker	2	3
(United States) G Magers	6	6
(United States) D Spence	2	3
(South Africa) D Van Rensburg	1	1
5	(Czechoslovakia) H Suková	6	6

Second round
14	(Italy) R Reggi	6	6
(United Kingdom) S Gomer	3	3
(Australia) A Minter	7^{7}	6
(United States) S Sloane	6^{3}	4
WC	(France) C Suire	7^{7}	3	0
(Soviet Union) N Zvereva	6^{3}	6	6
(United States) G Magers	3	1
5	(Czechoslovakia) H Suková	6	6

Third round
14	(Italy) R Reggi	7	6
(Australia) A Minter	5	2
(Soviet Union) N Zvereva	1	3
5	(Czechoslovakia) H Suková	6	6

Fourth round
14	(Italy) R Reggi	6	4	6
5	(Czechoslovakia) H Suková	3	6	2

=== Bottom half ===
==== Section 5 ====
First round
7	(Argentina) G Sabatini	6	6
LL	(Netherlands) M van der Torre	0	2
LL	(Sweden) K Karlsson	6	5	0
Q	(Italy) L Ferrando	2	7	6
(United States) C Benjamin	7	6
(United States) T Mochizuki	5	3
(United States) M Werdel	2	4
WC	(France) M Laval	6	6
(United States) T Phelps	6	0	6
Q	(Czechoslovakia) R Rajchrtová	3	6	4
(Austria) J Wiesner	6	6
(Australia) E Smylie	2	2
(Sweden) M Lindström	6^{3}	2
Q	(South Africa) K Schimper	7^{7}	6
(United States) L Bonder	6	6
9	(United States) L McNeil	3	3

Second round
7	(Argentina) G Sabatini	6	6
Q	(Italy) L Ferrando	2	4
(United States) C Benjamin	6	6
WC	(France) M Laval	0	2
(United States) T Phelps	6	6
(Austria) J Wiesner	3	3
Q	(South Africa) K Schimper	4	6	6
(United States) L Bonder	6	3	4

Third round
7	(Argentina) G Sabatini	6	2	6
(United States) C Benjamin	0	6	2
(United States) T Phelps	7^{9}	2	2
Q	(South Africa) K Schimper	6^{7}	6	6

Fourth round
7	(Argentina) G Sabatini	6	6
Q	(South Africa) K Schimper	4	1

==== Section 6 ====
First round
16	(United States) M Gurney	4	2
(Australia) N Provis	6	6
(United States) S Mascarin	2	4
(Austria) B Paulus	6	6
(United Kingdom) A Croft	6	3	1
(West Germany) G Dinu	2	6	6
(United States) E Burgin	5	3
(Spain) A Sánchez Vicario	7	6
(Australia) E Minter	5	3
(Sweden) C Karlsson	7	6
(West Germany) C Porwik	7^{7}	6
(Italy) F Bonsignori	6^{4}	4
(France) N Herreman	6	6
(Australia) L Field	4	2
(Socialist Federal Republic of Yugoslavia) M Jaušovec	0	0
4	(Czechoslovakia) H Mandlíková	6	6

Second round
(Australia) N Provis	4	4
(Austria) B Paulus	6	6
(West Germany) G Dinu	0	2
(Spain) A Sánchez Vicario	6	6
(Sweden) C Karlsson	6	3	9
(West Germany) C Porwik	4	6	7
(France) N Herreman	6	7^{7}
4	(Czechoslovakia) H Mandlíková	4	6^{5}

Third round
(Austria) B Paulus	4	2
(Spain) A Sánchez Vicario	6	6
(Sweden) C Karlsson	6	4	7
(France) N Herreman	3	6	5

Fourth round
(Spain) A Sánchez Vicario	6	6
(Sweden) C Karlsson	1	4

==== Section 7 ====
First round
6	(Bulgaria) M Maleeva-Fragnière	3	6	6
(Italy) A-M Cecchini	6	3	3
(United States) T Holladay	2	3
(Australia) D Balestrat	6	6
(United States) B Herr	2	4
(United States) G Fernández	6	6
(Netherlands) H ter Riet	1	1
Q	(Belgium) S Wasserman	6	6
(United States) S Walsh-Pete	2	3
(Greece) A Kanellopoulou	6	6
(South Africa) R Fairbank	2	3
(United States) H Cioffi	6	6
(United States) S Rehe	6	6
(United States) A Henricksson	3	2
(United States) K Horvath	6	0	2
13	(United States) M J Fernández	4	6	6

Second round
6	(Bulgaria) M Maleeva-Fragnière	6	6
(Australia) D Balestrat	2	0
(United States) G Fernández	3	2
Q	(Belgium) S Wasserman	6	6
(Greece) A Kanellopoulou	6	0	6
(United States) H Cioffi	1	6	3
(United States) S Rehe	7^{7}	1	6
13	(United States) M J Fernández	6^{4}	6	4

Third round
6	(Bulgaria) M Maleeva-Fragnière	5	6	6
Q	(Belgium) S Wasserman	7	3	1
(Greece) A Kanellopoulou	6^{3}	3
(United States) S Rehe	7^{7}	6

Fourth round
6	(Bulgaria) M Maleeva-Fragnière	7^{8}	6
(United States) S Rehe	6^{6}	1

==== Section 8 ====
First round
11	(Sweden) C Lindqvist	6	7^{7}
(Argentina) M Paz	0	6^{5}
(West Germany) S Meier	6	0	2
(Canada) H Kelesi	2	6	6
(Denmark) T Scheuer-Larsen	7	6
(Socialist Federal Republic of Yugoslavia) S Goleš	5	2
(Japan) K Okamoto	6^{1}	0
(United States) M Torres	7^{7}	6
(Italy) C Nozzoli	4	1
Q	(Czechoslovakia) R Zrubáková	6	6
(Czechoslovakia) J Novotná	6	6
(United Kingdom) J Durie	3	1
(Czechoslovakia) I Budařová	7^{10}	6
LL	(Brazil) G Miró	6^{8}	3
(Switzerland) C Cserepy	1	1
2	(West Germany) S Graf	6	6

Second round
11	(Sweden) C Lindqvist	5	5
(Canada) H Kelesi	7	7
(Denmark) T Scheuer-Larsen	6	4	3
(United States) M Torres	4	6	6
Q	(Czechoslovakia) R Zrubáková	3	6	4
(Czechoslovakia) J Novotná	6	4	6
(Czechoslovakia) I Budařová	1	1
2	(West Germany) S Graf	6	6

Third round
(Canada) H Kelesi	6	6
(United States) M Torres	1	3
(Czechoslovakia) J Novotná	0	1
2	(West Germany) S Graf	6	6

Fourth round
(Canada) H Kelesi	6^{3}	2
2	(West Germany) S Graf	7^{7}	6

Preceded by 1987 Australian Open – Women's singles	Grand Slam women's singles	Succeeded by 1987 Wimbledon Championships – Women's singles
