= 1987 French Open – Men's singles =

Men's singles
- 1987 French Open

Final
- Champion: (Czechoslovakia) Ivan Lendl
- Runner-up: (Sweden) Mats Wilander
- Score: 7–5, 6–2, 3–6, 7–6^{(7–3)}

Details
- Draw: 128
- Seeds: 16

Events
Singles	men	women		boys	girls
Doubles	men	women	mixed	boys	girls
WC Singles	men	women	quad
WC Doubles	men	women	quad
Legends	−45	45+	women
← 1986 ·	French Open	· 1988 →

Defending champion Ivan Lendl defeated Mats Wilander in the final, 7–5, 6–2, 3–6, 7–6^{(7–3)} to win the men's singles tennis title at the 1987 French Open. It was his third French Open title and fifth major title overall. The final was a rematch of the 1985 final, won by Wilander. It was Lendl's fourth consecutive final at the event.

== Seeds ==
The seeded players are listed below. Ivan Lendl is the champion; others show the round in which they were eliminated.

1. (Czechoslovakia) Ivan Lendl (champion)
2. (West Germany) Boris Becker (semifinals)
3. (Sweden) Stefan Edberg (second round)
4. (Sweden) Mats Wilander (finalist)
5. (Czechoslovakia) Miloslav Mečíř (semifinals)
6. (France) Yannick Noah (quarterfinals)
7. (United States) John McEnroe (first round)
8. (United States) Jimmy Connors (quarterfinals)
9. (France) Henri Leconte (first round)
10. (Ecuador) Andrés Gómez (quarterfinals)
11. (Sweden) Kent Carlsson (fourth round)
12. (Australia) Pat Cash (first round)
13. (Sweden) Mikael Pernfors (first round)
14. (Argentina) Martín Jaite (fourth round)
15. (United States) Brad Gilbert (second round)
16. (United States) Johan Kriek (first round)

== Draw ==
=== Key ===
- Q = Qualifier
- WC = Wild card
- LL = Lucky loser
- Alt = Alternate
- ITF = ITF entry
- PR = Protected ranking
- SR = Special ranking
- SE = Special exempt
- JE = Junior exempt
- JR = Junior Accelerator Programme entrant
- CO = College Accelerator Programme entrant
- NG = Next Gen Accelerator Program entrant
- w/o = Walkover
- r = Retired
- d = Defaulted

=== Finals ===
Quarterfinals
1	(Czechoslovakia) Ivan Lendl	5	6	6	6
10	(Ecuador) Andrés Gómez	7	4	1	1
(Czechoslovakia) Karel Nováček	6	1	2
5	(Czechoslovakia) Miloslav Mečíř	7	6	6
6	(France) Yannick Noah	4	3	2
4	(Sweden) Mats Wilander	6	6	6
8	(United States) Jimmy Connors	3	3	5
2	(West Germany) Boris Becker	6	6	7

Semifinals
1	(Czechoslovakia) Ivan Lendl	6	6	7
5	(Czechoslovakia) Miloslav Mečíř	3	3	6
4	(Sweden) Mats Wilander	6	6	6
2	(West Germany) Boris Becker	4	1	2

Final
1	(Czechoslovakia) Ivan Lendl	7	6	3	7^{7}
4	(Sweden) Mats Wilander	5	2	6	6^{3}

=== Section 1 ===
First round
1	(Czechoslovakia) I Lendl	7	7	0	6
(Haiti) R Agénor	5	6	6	3
Q	(Australia) L Warder	4	1	7	2
(United States) J Canter	6	6	5	6
(France) T Tulasne	3	6	1	6	6
(United States) D Rostagno	6	3	6	4	2
(Sweden) J Gunnarsson	6	7	6
(Sweden) P Carlsson	1	6	3
Q	(South Africa) M Robertson	6	3	6	7	6
(United States) G Layendecker	2	6	7	6	1
(Australia) M Kratzmann	0	3	6	4
Q	(Australia) D Cahill	6	6	4	6
(Czechoslovakia) M Vajda	6	3	6	7
(United States) R Seguso	4	6	2	6
(Sweden) J Nyström	6	6	6	6
16	(United States) J Kriek	7	2	2	1

Second round
1	(Czechoslovakia) I Lendl	3	6	6	6
(United States) J Canter	6	1	1	2
(France) T Tulasne	6	6	6
(Sweden) J Gunnarsson	2	3	3
Q	(South Africa) M Robertson	4	6	3
Q	(Australia) D Cahill	6	7	6
(Czechoslovakia) M Vajda	3	3	1
(Sweden) J Nyström	6	6	6

Third round
1	(Czechoslovakia) I Lendl	7	6	6
(France) T Tulasne	6	2	2
Q	(Australia) D Cahill	4	6	4
(Sweden) J Nyström	6	7	6

Fourth round
1	(Czechoslovakia) I Lendl	2	6	5	6	6
(Sweden) J Nyström	6	1	7	0	2

=== Section 2 ===
First round
10	(Ecuador) A Gómez	6	6	6
(Switzerland) R Stadler	4	2	1
(West Germany) C-U Steeb	2	4	6	4
WC	(France) T Champion	6	6	2	6
(West Germany) P Vojtíšek	6	6	4	5	4
(Brazil) L Mattar	3	0	6	7	6
(United States) J Berger	6	6	6
(Italy) C Pistolesi	1	3	3
(Australia) P McNamee	6	6	6
(Italy) P Canè	0	3	2
(Spain) E Sánchez	6	6	3	7
(Socialist Federal Republic of Yugoslavia) S Živojinović	4	3	6	6
(United States) S Giammalva Jr.	6	0	2	2
(United States) M Purcell	4	6	6	6
(Argentina) H de la Peña	4	6	6	6
7	(United States) J McEnroe	6	2	4	2

Second round
10	(Ecuador) A Gómez	7	6	6
WC	(France) T Champion	5	2	2
(Brazil) L Mattar	6	3	3
(United States) J Berger	7	6	6
(Australia) P McNamee	3	1	1
(Spain) E Sánchez	6	6	6
(United States) M Purcell	3	4	3
(Argentina) H de la Peña	6	6	6

Third round
10	(Ecuador) A Gómez	5	6	4	6	6
(United States) J Berger	7	1	6	3	4
(Spain) E Sánchez	6	6	4	6
(Argentina) H de la Peña	3	3	6	3

Fourth round
10	(Ecuador) A Gómez	5	1	7	7	6
(Spain) E Sánchez	7	6	6	5	4

=== Section 3 ===
First round
3	(Sweden) S Edberg	6	6	6
(United States) M Leach	2	3	3
WC	(France) É Winogradsky	7	7	6
(United States) M Freeman	6	5	3
(Switzerland) J Hlasek	4	7	5	6	4
(Argentina) E Bengoechea	6	6	7	4	6
(Czechoslovakia) K Nováček	6	6	6
Q	(Netherlands) T Nijssen	2	1	0
Q	(United States) B Willenborg	2	2	2
(Sweden) U Stenlund	6	6	6
(Argentina) G Pérez Roldán	1	3	2
(Austria) T Muster	6	6	6
WC	(France) T Pham	7	6	6
(West Germany) P Kühnen	6	3	2
Q	(West Germany) H Schwaier	2	3	4
14	(Argentina) M Jaite	6	6	6

Second round
3	(Sweden) S Edberg	6	6	5
WC	(France) É Winogradsky	7	7	7
(Argentina) E Bengoechea	0	0	0
(Czechoslovakia) K Nováček	6	6	6
(Sweden) U Stenlund	2	2	2
(Austria) T Muster	6	6	6
WC	(France) T Pham	4	2	2
14	(Argentina) M Jaite	6	6	6

Third round
WC	(France) É Winogradsky	1	0	6	4
(Czechoslovakia) K Nováček	6	6	2	6
(Austria) T Muster	2	6	6	0
14	(Argentina) M Jaite	6	3	7	6

Fourth round
(Czechoslovakia) K Nováček	7	6	6	6
14	(Argentina) M Jaite	6	4	7	3

=== Section 4 ===
First round
12	(Australia) P Cash	6	3	2	6
(United States) J Pugh	3	6	6	7
(Sweden) S Eriksson	6	6	4	3
(Australia) C Limberger	3	7	6	6
WC	(France) P Kuchna	6	6	7
Q	(Canada) G Michibata	3	2	6
(Peru) P Arraya	2	6	1	5
(United States) A Agassi	6	4	6	7
(Argentina) G Vilas	6	7	6
WC	(France) J Potier	3	6	4
(Israel) A Mansdorf	7	6	6	3
(Czechoslovakia) M Šrejber	5	7	7	6
(Austria) H Skoff	6	7	6
WC	(France) O Delaître	4	6	1
(United States) T Witsken	2	1	3
5	(Czechoslovakia) M Mečíř	6	6	6

Second round
(United States) J Pugh	6	6	6
(Australia) C Limberger	1	2	2
WC	(France) P Kuchna	6	6	6
(United States) A Agassi	4	3	3
(Argentina) G Vilas	3	4	2
(Czechoslovakia) M Šrejber	6	6	6
(Austria) H Skoff	6	4	1
5	(Czechoslovakia) M Mečíř	7	6	6

Third round
(United States) J Pugh	4	2	6	2
WC	(France) P Kuchna	6	6	3	6
(Czechoslovakia) M Šrejber	1	2	1
5	(Czechoslovakia) M Mečíř	6	6	6

Fourth round
WC	(France) P Kuchna	0	1	3
5	(Czechoslovakia) M Mečíř	6	6	6

=== Section 5 ===
First round
6	(France) Y Noah	6	6	6
(Brazil) I Kley	0	2	2
(Sweden) J Carlsson	2	1	3
(Sweden) C Bergström	6	6	6
(United States) S Davis	6	7	4	4
(Netherlands) M Schapers	7	5	6	6
(France) J-P Fleurian	2	3	4
Q	(Spain) J Sánchez	6	6	6
(Israel) G Bloom	1	1	3
(Argentina) F Yunis	6	6	6
(Czechoslovakia) T Šmid	5	2	3
Q	(France) L Courteau	7	6	6
(Spain) S Casal	6	6	6
Q	(Denmark) M Tauson	4	1	3
WC	(France) A Boetsch	1	0	3
11	(Sweden) K Carlsson	6	6	6

Second round
6	(France) Y Noah	7	6	7	6
(Sweden) C Bergström	5	7	5	1
(Netherlands) M Schapers	6	6	7
Q	(Spain) J Sánchez	4	2	5
(Argentina) F Yunis	6	7	6
Q	(France) L Courteau	0	6	1
(Spain) S Casal	3	1	3
11	(Sweden) K Carlsson	6	6	6

Third round
6	(France) Y Noah	6	6	6
(Netherlands) M Schapers	3	3	2
(Argentina) F Yunis	5	2	1
11	(Sweden) K Carlsson	7	6	6

Fourth round
6	(France) Y Noah	7	6	6	7
11	(Sweden) K Carlsson	6	3	7	5

=== Section 6 ===
First round
13	(Sweden) M Pernfors	6	3	4	0
(France) T Benhabiles	4	6	6	6
Q	(Italy) M Fioroni	3	6	3	1
(Sweden) A Järryd	6	4	6	6
Q	(Sweden) R Båthman	7	5	6	3
Q	(Spain) T Carbonell	5	7	7	6
(United States) G Donnelly	1	3	3
(Soviet Union) A Chesnokov	6	6	6
Q	(Sweden) L-A Wahlgren	6	6	6
(France) G Forget	3	4	4
(United States) A Krickstein	6	6	6
(Australia) W Masur	3	3	4
(United States) P Annacone	6	6	6
(Brazil) C Motta	4	1	3
(Italy) S Colombo	6	2	1	3	r
4	(Sweden) M Wilander	3	6	6	5

Second round
(France) T Benhabiles	7	0	2	6	9
(Sweden) A Järryd	6	6	6	3	7
Q	(Spain) T Carbonell	2	2	0
(Soviet Union) A Chesnokov	6	6	6
Q	(Sweden) L-A Wahlgren	4	1	1
(United States) A Krickstein	6	6	6
(United States) P Annacone	3	4	6	4
4	(Sweden) M Wilander	6	6	4	6

Third round
(France) T Benhabiles	5	6	7	6
(Soviet Union) A Chesnokov	7	4	5	3
(United States) A Krickstein	1	7	0	2
4	(Sweden) M Wilander	6	6	6	6

Fourth round
(France) T Benhabiles	7	1	3	3
4	(Sweden) M Wilander	5	6	6	6

=== Section 7 ===
First round
8	(United States) J Connors	7	6	6
(United States) T Nelson	5	2	2
(Czechoslovakia) L Pimek	5	7	2	3
(West Germany) M Westphal	7	5	6	6
Q	(Netherlands) J Vekemans	5	6	6	2	7
(Argentina) F Davín	7	3	2	6	9
(Canada) M Laurendeau	3	6	3	6
LL	(Austria) A Antonitsch	6	2	6	7
(West Germany) A Maurer	4	2	5
(West Germany) D Keretić	6	6	7
(Sweden) P Lundgren	5	5	4
(United States) M De Palmer	7	7	6
(Australia) J Fitzgerald	6	5	3
(United States) M Anger	7	7	6
(West Germany) R Osterthun	6	6	6	6
9	(France) H Leconte	3	3	7	1

Second round
8	(United States) J Connors	6	3	7	6
(West Germany) M Westphal	4	6	6	2
(Argentina) F Davín	5	6	6	6
LL	(Austria) A Antonitsch	7	3	2	3
(West Germany) D Keretić	3	6	6	6
(United States) M De Palmer	6	2	2	4
(United States) M Anger	2	6	2
(West Germany) R Osterthun	6	7	6

Third round
8	(United States) J Connors	6	6	6
(Argentina) F Davín	3	1	2
(West Germany) D Keretić	4	7	2	4
(West Germany) R Osterthun	6	5	6	6

Fourth round
8	(United States) J Connors	4	7	6	6
(West Germany) R Osterthun	6	5	0	3

=== Section 8 ===
First round
15	(United States) B Gilbert	1	7	2	6	6
(Socialist Federal Republic of Yugoslavia) B Orešar	6	5	6	4	4
(Spain) J Arrese	6	6	7
WC	(France) T Van Den Daele	3	2	5
(United States) B Scanlon	2	6	2
(United States) J Arias	6	7	6
(Sweden) J Svensson	6	6	6
Q	(United States) L Shiras	4	0	2
(United States) G Holmes	3	4	5
(Sweden) H Sundström	6	6	7
(Sweden) T Högstedt	4	0	6	1
(West Germany) E Jelen	6	6	3	6
(United States) M Buckley	2	6	6	7
(Peru) J Yzaga	6	1	4	6
(Uruguay) D Pérez	0	1	5
2	(West Germany) B Becker	6	6	7

Second round
15	(United States) B Gilbert	5	2	1
(Spain) J Arrese	7	6	6
(United States) J Arias	7	6	2	6
(Sweden) J Svensson	5	1	6	4
(Sweden) H Sundström	2	6	6	5	8
(West Germany) E Jelen	6	3	0	7	6
(United States) M Buckley	1	6	3	2
2	(West Germany) B Becker	6	4	6	6

Third round
(Spain) J Arrese	6	6	2	6	2
(United States) J Arias	4	7	6	4	6
(Sweden) H Sundström	1	6	3	1
2	(West Germany) B Becker	6	3	6	6

Fourth round
(United States) J Arias	7	3	2	0
2	(West Germany) B Becker	5	6	6	6

Preceded by 1987 Australian Open – Men's singles	Grand Slam men's singles	Succeeded by 1987 Wimbledon Championships – Men's singles
