= Mark Buckley (tennis) =

American tennis player (born 1960)

- Full name: Mark Buckley
- Country (sports): United States
- Born: September 1, 1960 (age 64); Bogalusa, Louisiana
- Plays: Right-handed
- Prize money: $44,636

Singles
- Career record: 6–17
- Career titles: 0
- Highest ranking: No. 124 (April 20, 1987)

Grand Slam singles results
- French Open: 2R (1987)

Doubles
- Career record: 0–3
- Highest ranking: No. 374 (January 3, 1983)

Mark Buckley (born September 1, 1960) is a former professional tennis player from the United States.

== Biography ==
Buckley was born in Bogalusa, Louisiana and attended the University of Alabama, before competing on the professional tennis tour in the 1980s

Ranked as high as 124 in singles, he won one Challenger title, at Bergen in 1986.

Most notably he reached the second round of the 1987 French Open. After beating Jaime Yzaga in the first round, he took second seed Boris Becker to four sets in a second round loss.

== Challenger titles ==
=== Singles: (1) ===
No.	Year	Tournament	Surface	Opponent	Score
1.	1986	Bergen, Norway	Clay	(Sweden) Christer Allgårdh	1–6, 7–6, 6–2
