= Patrice Kuchna =

French tennis player

- Country (sports): France
- Born: 10 May 1960 (age 64); Denain, France
- Height: 1.78 m (5 ft 10 in)
- Plays: Right-handed
- Prize money: $32,999

Singles
- Career record: 7–14
- Career titles: 0
- Highest ranking: No. 125 (2 January 1984)

Grand Slam singles results
- French Open: 4R (1987)

Doubles
- Career record: 0–2
- Career titles: 0
- Highest ranking: No. 650 (19 October 1987)

Patrice Kuchna (born 10 May 1963) is a former tennis player from France. He did not win any Grand Prix tour singles titles during his professional career.

Kuchna was born in Denain, Nord, in the Nord-Pas-de-Calais region. The right-hander reached his highest singles ATP-ranking on 2 January 1984, when he became the World No. 125. Kuchna won against Andre Agassi at Roland Garros, going to the 1/8.

He is the personal tennis coach of Emmanuel Macron, French president.
