= Bobby Blair (tennis) =

American tennis player

- Country (sports): United States
- Born: October 24, 1964 (age 60); Fort Lauderdale, Florida
- Height: 1.78 m (5 ft 10 in)
- Plays: Right-handed
- Prize money: $4,182

Singles
- Career record: 0–2
- Highest ranking: No. 490 (May 12, 1986)

Doubles
- Career record: 1–1
- Highest ranking: No. 557 (July 28, 1986)

Bobby Blair (born October 24, 1964) is a former professional tennis player from the United States.

Blair was one of the top junior tennis players of his country. He was an All-American at the University of Arkansas and participated in the 1986 Goodwill Games.

His highlight in the Grand Prix tennis circuit was a second round appearance at the 1985 U.S. Pro Tennis Championships in doubles, partnering with Jay Berger.

== Personal life ==
Blair is gay. In 2014, he wrote a memoir titled Hiding Inside the Baseline about his personal journey as a gay athlete who did not come out until his late 40s.
