= 1987 French Open =

- Date: 25 May – 7 June 1987
- Edition: 86
- Category: 57th Grand Slam (ITF)
- Surface: Clay
- Location: Paris (XVI^{e}), France
- Venue: Stade Roland Garros

Champions

Men's singles
- (Czechoslovakia) Ivan Lendl

Women's singles
- (West Germany) Steffi Graf

Men's doubles
- (Sweden) Anders Järryd / (United States) Robert Seguso

Women's doubles
- (United States) Martina Navratilova / (United States) Pam Shriver

Mixed doubles
- (United States) Pam Shriver / (Spain) Emilio Sánchez Vicario
- French Open

The 1987 French Open was a tennis tournament that took place on the outdoor clay courts at the Stade Roland Garros in Paris, France. The tournament was held from 25 May until 7 June. It was the 86th staging of the French Open, and the second Grand Slam tennis event of 1987.

The event was part of the 1987 Nabisco Grand Prix and 1987 Virginia Slims World Championship Series.

== Finals ==
=== Men's singles ===
(Czechoslovakia) Ivan Lendl defeated (Sweden) Mats Wilander, 7–5, 6–2, 3–6, 7–6^{(7–3)}.

- It was Lendl's 2nd title of the year, and his 64th overall. It was his 5th career Grand Slam title, and his 3rd French Open title.

=== Women's singles ===
(West Germany) Steffi Graf defeated (United States) Martina Navratilova, 6–4, 4–6, 8–6.

- It was Graf's 1st career Grand Slam title.

=== Men's doubles ===
(Sweden) Anders Järryd / (United States) Robert Seguso defeated (France) Guy Forget / (France) Yannick Noah, 6–7, 6–7, 6–3, 6–4, 6–2.

=== Women's doubles ===
(United States) Martina Navratilova / (United States) Pam Shriver defeated (West Germany) Steffi Graf / (Argentina) Gabriela Sabatini, 6–2, 6–1.

=== Mixed doubles ===
(United States) Pam Shriver / (Spain) Emilio Sánchez Vicario defeated (United States) Lori McNeil / (United States) Sherwood Stewart, 6–3, 7–6^{(7–4)}.

== Prize money ==
| Event | | W | F | SF | QF | 4R | 3R | 2R | 1R |
| Singles | Men | FF1,303,800 | FF651,900 | FF325,950 | FF165,150 | FF86,900 | FF48,625 | FF28,700 | FF17,500 |
| Singles | Women | FF1,178,840 | FF594,220 | FF289,220 | FF147,780 | FF72,370 | FF37,320 | FF19,780 | FF10,270 |

Total prize money for the event was FF19,948,960.

| Preceded by 1987 Australian Open | Grand Slams | Succeeded by 1987 Wimbledon Championships |
