= Andrés Gómez =

Ecuadorian tennis player

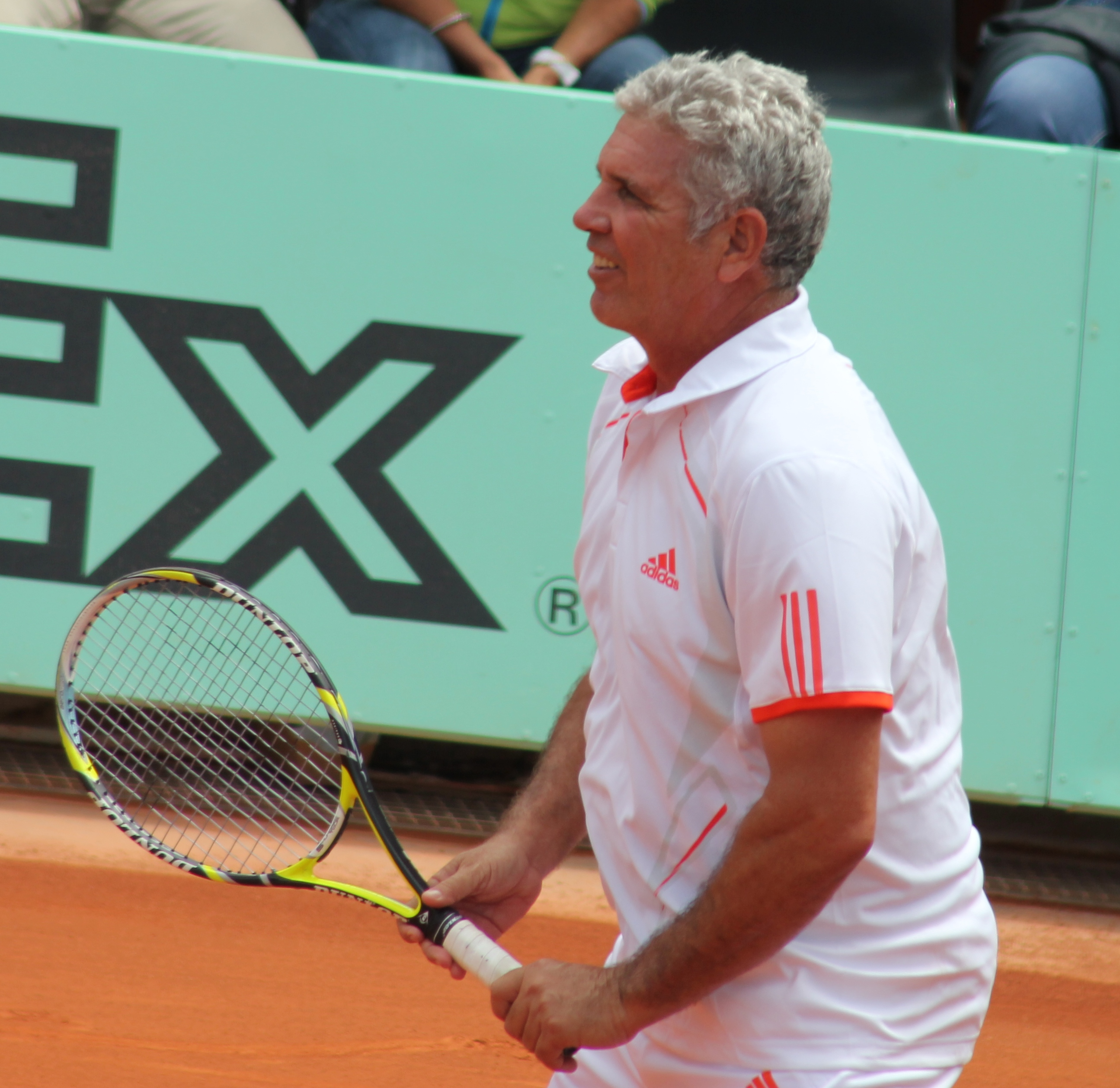
- Full name: Andrés Gómez Santos
- Country (sports): Ecuador
- Born: 27 February 1960 (age 66) Guayaquil, Ecuador
- Height: 1.93 m (6 ft 4 in)
- Turned pro: 1979
- Retired: 1995
- Plays: Left-handed (one-handed backhand)
- Prize money: $4,385,130

Singles
- Career record: 531–273 (66.0%)
- Career titles: 21
- Highest ranking: No. 4 (11 June 1990)

Grand Slam singles results
- Australian Open: 4R (1990)
- French Open: W (1990)
- Wimbledon: QF (1984)
- US Open: QF (1984)

Other tournaments
- Tour Finals: SF (1985)
- Grand Slam Cup: 1R (1990)
- WCT Finals: SF (1987)

Doubles
- Career record: 369–194 (65.6%)
- Career titles: 33
- Highest ranking: No. 1 (15 September 1986)

Grand Slam doubles results
- Australian Open: 2R (1992)
- French Open: W (1988)
- Wimbledon: SF (1987)
- US Open: W (1986)
Medal record
Pan American Games – Tennis
Bronze medal – third place	1979 San Juan	Singles

Andrés Gómez Santos (Latin American Spanish: [anˈdɾes ˈɣomes ˈsantos]; (Note: In isolation, Gómez is pronounced [ˈɡomes].) born 27 February 1960) is an Ecuadorian former professional tennis player. He was ranked as high as world No. 4 in singles and world No. 1 in doubles. Gómez won 21 singles titles and 33 doubles titles during his career, including a singles major at the 1990 French Open, and two doubles majors at the 1986 US Open and the 1988 French Open.

Andrés Gómez is the current director of the Guayaquil Challenger and the former director of the Salinas Challenger.

== Personal information ==
His son, Emilio Gómez, is a professional tennis player. His nephew Nicolás Lapentti was also a professional tennis player who reached a world ranking of No. 6, and another nephew, Roberto Quiroz was also a professional tennis player.

== Career ==
Gómez turned professional in 1979. Early success in his career came mainly in doubles competition. He won five doubles titles in 1980 and seven in 1981.

In 1986, Gómez attained the world No. 1 doubles ranking. He won seven doubles events that year, including the US Open men's doubles title (partnering Slobodan Živojinović). Gómez won a second Grand Slam men's doubles title in 1988 at the French Open (partnering Emilio Sánchez).

His first top-level singles title came in 1981 in Bordeaux over Thierry Tulasne in the final. He then won the Italian Open in 1982, beating Eliot Teltscher in the final in three sets, and again in 1984, when he defeated Aaron Krickstein in four sets.

In 1990, Gómez reached his first and only Grand Slam singles final at the French Open. He beat Fernando Luna, Marcelo Filippini, Alexander Volkov, Magnus Gustafsson, Thierry Champion, and Thomas Muster to reach the final. There he faced 20-year-old Andre Agassi who, like Gómez, was playing in his first Grand Slam singles final. The up-and-coming American star was considered the favourite, but Gómez seized the moment and claimed the title with a four-set win. 30 year old Gomez said "at this point last year, I was just thinking of taking some time off, maybe even taking time off forever". Gómez reached his career-high singles ranking of world No. 4 that month.

Throughout his career, Gómez won 21 singles and 33 doubles titles. His last singles title was won in 1991 in Brasília. His final doubles title came in 1992 in Barcelona.

== Grand Slam finals ==
=== Singles: 1 (1–0) ===
Result	Year	Championship	Surface	Opponent	Score
Win	1990	French Open	Clay	(United States) Andre Agassi	6–3, 2–6, 6–4, 6–4

=== Doubles: 2 (2–0) ===
Result	Year	Championship	Surface	Partner	Opponents	Score
Win	1986	US Open	Hard	(Socialist Federal Republic of Yugoslavia) Slobodan Živojinović	(Sweden) Joakim Nyström (Sweden) Mats Wilander	4–6, 6–3, 6–3, 4–6, 6–3
Win	1988	French Open	Clay	(Spain) Emilio Sánchez	(Australia) John Fitzgerald (Sweden) Anders Järryd	6–3, 6–7, 6–4, 6–3

== Career finals ==
=== Singles: 35 (21 titles / 14 runners-up) ===
Legend Grand Slam (1–0) Grand Prix Super Series (2–0) ATP Championship Series (1–1) Grand Prix Regular Series / ATP World Series (17–13)	Finals by surface Hard (4–3) Clay (16–7) Grass (0–0) Carpet (1–4)

Result	W-L	Date	Tournament	Surface	Opponent	Score
Loss	0–1	Feb 1980	Sarasota, United States	Clay	(United States) Eddie Dibbs	1–6, 1–6
Win	1–1	Sep 1981	Bordeaux, France	Clay	(France) Thierry Tulasne	7–6, 7–6, 6–1
Loss	1–2	Nov 1981	Santiago, Chile	Clay	(Chile) Hans Gildemeister	4–6, 5–7
Loss	1–3	Feb 1982	Denver, U.S.	Carpet (i)	(United States) John Sadri	6–4, 1–6, 4–6
Win	2–3	May 1982	Rome, Italy	Clay	(United States) Eliot Teltscher	6–2, 6–3, 6–2
Win	3–3	Nov 1982	Quito, Ecuador	Clay	(France) Loïc Courteau	6–3, 6–4
Loss	3–4	Jul 1983	North Conway, U.S.	Clay	(Argentina) José Luis Clerc	3–6, 1–6
Loss	3–5	Aug 1983	Indianapolis, U.S.	Clay	(United States) Jimmy Arias	4–6, 6–2, 4–6
Win	4–5	Sep 1983	Dallas, U.S.	Hard	(United States) Brian Teacher	6–7^{(2–7)}, 6–1, 6–1
Loss	4–6	Oct 1983	Tokyo, Japan	Hard	(United States) Eliot Teltscher	5–7, 6–3, 1–6
Win	5–6	Apr 1984	Nice, France	Clay	(Sweden) Henrik Sundström	6–1, 6–4
Win	6–6	May 1984	Rome, Italy (2)	Clay	(United States) Aaron Krickstein	2–6, 6–1, 6–2, 6–2
Win	7–6	Jul 1984	Washington, U.S.	Clay	(United States) Aaron Krickstein	6–2, 6–2
Win	8–6	Aug 1984	Indianapolis, U.S.	Clay	(Hungary) Balázs Taróczy	6–0, 7–6^{(7–5)}
Win	9–6	Oct 1984	Hong Kong, U.K.	Hard	(Czechoslovakia) Tomáš Šmíd	6–3, 6–2
Loss	9–7	Nov 1984	Wembley, U.K.	Carpet (i)	(Czechoslovakia) Ivan Lendl	6–7^{(1–7)}, 2–6, 1–6
Loss	9–8	Jul 1985	Indianapolis, U.S.	Clay	(Czechoslovakia) Ivan Lendl	1–6, 3–6
Win	10–8	Nov 1985	Hong Kong, U.K.	Hard	(United States) Aaron Krickstein	6–3, 6–3, 3–6, 6–4
Win	11–8	Apr 1986	Indianapolis, U.S.	Clay	(France) Thierry Tulasne	6–4, 7–6^{(7–1)}
Win	12–8	May 1986	Florence, Italy	Clay	(Sweden) Henrik Sundström	6–3, 6–4
Win	13–8	Jul 1986	Boston, U.S.	Clay	(Argentina) Martín Jaite	7–5, 6–4
Loss	13–9	Aug 1986	Kitzbühel, Austria	Clay	(Czechoslovakia) Miloslav Mečíř	4–6, 6–4, 1–6, 6–2, 3–6
Loss	13–10	Nov 1986	Hong Kong, U.K.	Hard	(India) Ramesh Krishnan	6–7^{(7–9)}, 0–6, 5–7
Win	14–10	Nov 1986	Itaparica, Brazil	Hard	(France) Jean-Philippe Fleurian	4–6, 6–4, 6–4
Win	15–10	May 1987	Forest Hills, U.S.	Clay	(France) Yannick Noah	6–4, 7–6^{(7–5)}, 7–6^{(7–1)}
Loss	15–11	Nov 1987	Frankfurt, Germany	Carpet (i)	(United States) Tim Mayotte	6–7^{(6–8)}, 4–6
Loss	15–12	Jul 1988	Stuttgart, Germany	Clay	(United States) Andre Agassi	4–6, 2–6
Loss	15–13	Jul 1988	Washington, U.S.	Hard	(United States) Jimmy Connors	1–6, 4–6
Win	16–13	Jul 1989	Boston, U.S.	Clay	(Sweden) Mats Wilander	6–1, 6–4
Win	17–13	Sep 1989	Barcelona, Spain	Clay	(Austria) Horst Skoff	6–4, 6–4, 6–2
Loss	17–14	Feb 1990	Philadelphia, U.S.	Carpet (i)	(United States) Pete Sampras	6–7^{(4–7)}, 5–7, 2–6
Win	18–14	Apr 1990	Barcelona, Spain	Clay	(Argentina) Guillermo Pérez Roldán	6–0, 7–6^{(7–1)}, 3–6, 0–6, 6–2
Win	19–14	Apr 1990	Madrid, Spain	Clay	(Switzerland) Marc Rosset	6–3, 7–6^{(7–3)}
Win	20–14	Jun 1990	French Open, Paris	Clay	(United States) Andre Agassi	6–3, 2–6, 6–4, 6–4
Win	21–14	Sep 1991	Brasília, Brazil	Carpet	(Spain) Javier Sánchez	6–4, 3–6, 6–3

=== Doubles: 51 (33 titles / 18 runners-up) ===
Result	W-L	Date	Tournament	Surface	Partner	Opponents	Score
Win	1–0	Feb 1980	Sarasota, U.S.	Clay	(Ecuador) Ricardo Ycaza	(Australia) David Carter (United States) Rick Fagel	6–3, 6–4
Win	2–0	May 1980	Hamburg, Germany	Clay	(Chile) Hans Gildemeister	(West Germany) Reinhart Probst (West Germany) Max Wünschig	6–3, 6–4
Loss	2–1	Jul 1980	Boston, U.S.	Clay	(Chile) Hans Gildemeister	(United States) Gene Mayer (United States) Sandy Mayer	6–1, 4–6, 4–6
Win	3–1	Jul 1980	Washington, U.S.	Clay	(Chile) Hans Gildemeister	(United States) Gene Mayer (United States) Sandy Mayer	6–4, 7–5
Win	4–1	Oct 1980	Madrid, Spain	Clay	(Chile) Hans Gildemeister	(Czechoslovakia) Jan Kodeš (Hungary) Balázs Taróczy	3–6, 6–3, 10–8
Win	5–1	Nov 1980	Quito, Ecuador	Clay	(Chile) Hans Gildemeister	(Argentina) José Luis Clerc (Chile) Belus Prajoux	6–3, 1–6, 6–4
Loss	5–2	Nov 1980	Bogotá, Colombia	Clay	(Ecuador) Ricardo Ycaza	(Chile) Álvaro Fillol (Brazil) Carlos Kirmayr	4–6, 3–6
Loss	5–3	Feb 1981	Viña del Mar, Chile	Clay	(Chile) Belus Prajoux	(Australia) David Carter (Australia) Paul Kronk	1–6, 2–6
Win	6–3	May 1981	Hamburg, Germany	Clay	(Chile) Hans Gildemeister	(Australia) Peter McNamara (Australia) Paul McNamee	6–4, 3–6, 6–4
Win	7–3	May 1981	Rome, Italy	Clay	(Chile) Hans Gildemeister	(United States) Bruce Manson (Czechoslovakia) Tomáš Šmíd	7–5, 6–2
Win	8–3	Jun 1981	Brussels Outdoor, Belgium	Clay	(Argentina) Ricardo Cano	(Brazil) Carlos Kirmayr (Brazil) Cássio Motta	6–2, 6–2
Loss	8–4	Jul 1981	Boston, U.S.	Clay	(Chile) Hans Gildemeister	(Mexico) Raúl Ramírez (Czechoslovakia) Pavel Složil	4–6, 6–7
Win	9–4	Sep 1981	Bordeaux, France	Clay	(Chile) Belus Prajoux	(United States) Jim Gurfein (Sweden) Anders Järryd	7–5, 6–3
Win	10–4	Oct 1981	Madrid, Spain	Clay	(Chile) Hans Gildemeister	(Switzerland) Heinz Günthardt (Czechoslovakia) Tomáš Šmíd	6–2, 3–6, 6–3
Loss	10–5	Oct 1981	Barcelona, Spain	Clay	(Chile) Hans Gildemeister	(Sweden) Anders Järryd (Sweden) Hans Simonsson	1–6, 4–6
Win	11–5	Nov 1981	Quito, Ecuador	Clay	(Chile) Hans Gildemeister	(Australia) David Carter (Ecuador) Ricardo Ycaza	7–5, 6–3
Win	12–5	Nov 1981	Santiago, Chile	Clay	(Chile) Hans Gildemeister	(Argentina) Ricardo Cano (Chile) Belus Prajoux	6–2, 7–6
Loss	12–6	Jul 1982	Washington, U.S.	Clay	(Chile) Hans Gildemeister	(Mexico) Raúl Ramírez (United States) Van Winitsky	5–7, 6–7
Win	13–6	Sep 1982	Bordeaux, France	Clay	(Chile) Hans Gildemeister	(Sweden) Anders Järryd (Sweden) Hans Simonsson	6–4, 6–2
Loss	13–7	Feb 1983	Caracas, Venezuela	Hard	(Romania) Ilie Năstase	(Chile) Jaime Fillol Sr. (United States) Stan Smith	7–6, 4–6, 3–6
Loss	13–8	Nov 1983	Johannesburg, South Africa	Hard	(United States) Sherwood Stewart	(United States) Steve Meister (United States) Brian Teacher	7–6, 6–7, 2–6
Loss	13–9	Apr 1984	Nice, France	Clay	(Chile) Hans Gildemeister	(Sweden) Jan Gunnarsson (Denmark) Michael Mortensen	1–6, 5–7
Win	14–9	Nov 1984	Wembley, England	Carpet (i)	(Czechoslovakia) Ivan Lendl	(Czechoslovakia) Pavel Složil (Czechoslovakia) Tomáš Šmíd	6–2, 6–2
Win	15–9	Apr 1985	Marbella, Spain	Clay	(Brazil) Cássio Motta	(France) Loïc Courteau (Netherlands) Michiel Schapers	6–1, 6–1
Win	16–9	May 1985	Hamburg, Germany	Clay	(Chile) Hans Gildemeister	(Switzerland) Heinz Günthardt (Hungary) Balázs Taróczy	1–6, 7–6, 6–4
Win	17–9	Nov 1985	Stockholm, Sweden	Hard (i)	(France) Guy Forget	(United States) Mike De Palmer (United States) Gary Donnelly	6–3, 6–4
Win	18–9	Mar 1986	Ft. Myers, U.S.	Hard	(Czechoslovakia) Ivan Lendl	(Australia) Peter Doohan (Australia) Paul McNamee	7–5, 6–4
Win	19–9	May 1986	Indianapolis, U.S.	Clay	(Chile) Hans Gildemeister	(Australia) John Fitzgerald (United States) Sherwood Stewart	6–4, 6–3
Win	20–9	May 1986	Forest Hills, U.S.	Clay	(Chile) Hans Gildemeister	(West Germany) Boris Becker (Socialist Federal Republic of Yugoslavia) Slobodan Živojinović	7–6, 7–6
Win	21–9	Jul 1986	Boston, U.S.	Clay	(Chile) Hans Gildemeister	(United States) Dan Cassidy (United States) Mel Purcell	4–6, 7–5, 6–0
Win	22–9	Aug 1986	Washington, U.S.	Clay	(Chile) Hans Gildemeister	(Brazil) Ricardo Acioly (Brazil) Cesar Kist	6–3, 7–5
Loss	22–10	Aug 1986	Kitzbühel, Austria	Clay	(Chile) Hans Gildemeister	(Switzerland) Heinz Günthardt (Czechoslovakia) Tomáš Šmíd	6–4, 3–6, 6–7
Win	23–10	Sep 1986	US Open, New York	Hard	(Socialist Federal Republic of Yugoslavia) Slobodan Živojinović	(Sweden) Joakim Nyström (Sweden) Mats Wilander	4–6, 6–3, 6–3, 4–6, 6–3
Win	24–10	Sep 1986	Stuttgart Outdoor, Germany	Clay	(Chile) Hans Gildemeister	(Iran) Mansour Bahrami (Uruguay) Diego Pérez	6–4, 6–3
Loss	24–11	Oct 1986	Tokyo Indoor, Japan	Carpet (i)	(Czechoslovakia) Ivan Lendl	(United States) Mike De Palmer (United States) Gary Donnelly	3–6, 5–7
Loss	24–12	Nov 1986	Johannesburg, South Africa	Hard (i)	(United States) Sherwood Stewart	(United States) Mike De Palmer (South Africa) Christo van Rensburg	6–3, 2–6, 6–7
Loss	24–13	Apr 1987	Tokyo Outdoor, Japan	Hard	(Sweden) Anders Järryd	(United States) Paul Annacone (United States) Kevin Curren	4–6, 6–7
Win	25–13	Apr 1987	Monte Carlo, Monaco	Clay	(Chile) Hans Gildemeister	(Iran) Mansour Bahrami (Denmark) Michael Mortensen	6–2, 6–4
Win	26–13	Jul 1987	Boston, U.S.	Clay	(Chile) Hans Gildemeister	(Sweden) Joakim Nyström (Sweden) Mats Wilander	7–6, 3–6, 6–1
Win	27–13	Jun 1988	French Open, Paris	Clay	(Spain) Emilio Sánchez	(Australia) John Fitzgerald (Sweden) Anders Järryd	6–3, 6–7, 6–4, 6–3
Loss	27–14	Jul 1988	Gstaad, Switzerland	Clay	(Spain) Emilio Sánchez	(Czechoslovakia) Petr Korda (Czechoslovakia) Milan Šrejber	6–7, 6–7
Win	28–14	Oct 1988	Tokyo Indoor, Japan	Carpet (i)	(Socialist Federal Republic of Yugoslavia) Slobodan Živojinović	(West Germany) Boris Becker (West Germany) Eric Jelen	7–5, 5–7, 6–3
Win	29–14	Jul 1989	Boston, U.S.	Clay	(Argentina) Alberto Mancini	(United States) Todd Nelson (United States) Phil Williamson	7–6, 6–2
Win	30–14	Sep 1989	Geneva, Switzerland	Clay	(Argentina) Alberto Mancini	(Iran) Mansour Bahrami (Argentina) Guillermo Pérez Roldán	6–3, 7–5
Loss	30–15	Oct 1989	Tokyo Indoor, Japan	Carpet (i)	(Socialist Federal Republic of Yugoslavia) Slobodan Živojinović	(United States) Kevin Curren (United States) David Pate	6–4, 3–6, 6–7
Win	31–15	Apr 1990	Barcelona, Spain	Clay	(Spain) Javier Sánchez	(Spain) Sergio Casal (Spain) Emilio Sánchez	7–6, 7–5
Loss	31–16	Apr 1990	Monte Carlo, Monaco	Clay	(Spain) Javier Sánchez	(Czechoslovakia) Petr Korda (Czechoslovakia) Tomáš Šmíd	4–6, 6–7
Loss	31–17	May 1990	Madrid, Spain	Clay	(Spain) Javier Sánchez	(Spain) Juan Carlos Baguena (Italy) Omar Camporese	4–6, 6–3, 3–6
Loss	31–18	Aug 1991	Schenectady, U.S.	Hard	(Spain) Emilio Sánchez	(Spain) Javier Sánchez (Australia) Todd Woodbridge	6–3, 6–7, 6–7
Win	32–18	Nov 1991	São Paulo, Brazil	Hard	(Brazil) Jaime Oncins	(Mexico) Jorge Lozano (Brazil) Cássio Motta	7–5, 6–4
Win	33–18	Apr 1992	Barcelona, Spain	Clay	(Spain) Javier Sánchez	(Czechoslovakia) Ivan Lendl (Czechoslovakia) Karel Nováček	6–4, 6–4

== Performance timelines ==
Key
W	F	SF	QF	#R	RR	Q#	DNQ	A	NH

(W) winner; (F) finalist; (SF) semifinalist; (QF) quarterfinalist; (#R) rounds 4, 3, 2, 1; (RR) round-robin stage; (Q#) qualification round; (DNQ) did not qualify; (A) absent; (NH) not held; (SR) strike rate (events won / competed); (W–L) win–loss record.

=== Singles ===
Tournament	1979	1980	1981	1982	1983	1984	1985	1986	1987	1988	1989	1990	1991	1992	SR
Grand Slam tournaments
Australian Open	A	A	A	A	A	A	A	NH	A	A	A	4R	A	1R	0 / 2
French Open	A	2R	2R	4R	4R	QF	3R	QF	QF	2R	2R	W	A	2R	1 / 12
Wimbledon	A	1R	A	1R	A	QF	A	1R	4R	A	2R	1R	A	A	0 / 7
US Open	2R	2R	3R	A	4R	QF	A	2R	4R	3R	3R	1R	1R	A	0 / 11
SR	0 / 1	0 / 3	0 / 2	0 / 2	0 / 2	0 / 3	0 / 1	0 / 3	0 / 3	0 / 2	0 / 3	1 / 4	0 / 1	0 / 2	1 / 32
Year-end championship
Tennis Masters Cup	A	A	A	A	QF	QF	SF	RR	A	A	A	RR	A	A	0 / 5
Year-end ranking	61	44	37	15	14	5	15	10	11	24	17	6	70	179	

=== Doubles ===
Tournament	1979	1980	1981	1982	1983	1984	1985	1986	1987	1988	1989	1990	1991	1992	SR
Australian Open	A	A	A	A	A	A	A	NH	A	A	A	1R	A	2R	0 / 2
French Open	A	2R	2R	A	1R	1R	A	2R	3R	W	1R	A	A	1R	1 / 9
Wimbledon	A	A	A	A	A	1R	A	1R	SF	A	A	A	A	A	0 / 3
US Open	2R	1R	1R	A	1R	1R	A	W	SF	3R	2R	A	3R	A	1 / 10
SR	0 / 1	0 / 2	0 / 2	0 / 0	0 / 2	0 / 3	0 / 0	1 / 3	0 / 3	1 / 2	0 / 2	0 / 1	0 / 1	0 / 2	2 / 24
