= Matt Anger =

American tennis player and coach (born 1963)

- Country (sports): United States
- Residence: Clyde Hill, WA, US
- Born: June 20, 1963 (age 63) Walnut Creek, California, US
- Height: 1.88 m (6 ft 2 in)
- Turned pro: 1984
- Retired: 1991
- Plays: Right-handed
- Prize money: $484,631

Singles
- Career record: 82–106
- Career titles: 1
- Highest ranking: No. 23 (24 February 1986)

Grand Slam singles results
- Australian Open: 3R (1983, 1985, 1987)
- French Open: 2R (1987)
- Wimbledon: 4R (1986)
- US Open: 4R (1986)

Other tournaments
- WCT Finals: 1R (1986)

Doubles
- Career record: 59–72
- Career titles: 2
- Highest ranking: No. 53 (20 April 1987)

Grand Slam doubles results
- Australian Open: 2R (1987)
- French Open: 1R (1987)
- Wimbledon: 3R (1988)
- US Open: 2R (1988)

Matt Anger (born June 20, 1963) is an American former professional tennis player. He is the former head men's tennis coach at the University of Washington. He is the current coach of tennis professional Clément Chidekh.

== Professional tennis career ==
Anger grew up in Pleasanton, California, and played at Amador Valley High School. He went on to be named the national 16-and-under singles champion in 1979 and to win the 1981 junior Wimbledon boys' singles title, resulting in a No. 1 ranking in the world by Tennis Magazine. He played collegiate tennis at USC from 1982 to 1984. He was a three-time All-American in these three years and was a Pac-10 singles finalist in 1983. In the same year, he led the USC Trojans to a third-place NCAA finish. The next season, he won the Pac-10 doubles championship, was a Pac-10 singles semifinalist, and helped USC win the Pac-10 conference championship. After this season, he turned to professional tennis.

The right-handed Anger reached his highest singles ranking on the ATP Tour on February 24, 1986, when he became the world No. 23. He won one singles (Johannesburg in 1985) and two doubles titles (Tokyo outdoor in 1986 and Brisbane in 1987) during his career.

== Retirement from the tour ==
Anger retired from the tour in 1991 and is currently the men's tennis coach at the University of Washington. He resides in Clyde Hill, Washington with his wife, Kristin, and two children.

== Coaching career ==
Anger initially joined the coaching staff at the University of Southern California. He then moved to the University of Washington where he became the head coach in 1995. He is the most successful coach in Washington history with 371 wins. His teams have missed the NCAA championships only twice and have had five runs to the NCAA round of 16 since 2001.

Anger and his team have had a winning record in 21 of 22 seasons. He was named Pac-10 Coach of the Year in 2005 when the team won its first-ever Pac-10 title. Six singles players have earned All-American honors under his coaching and 11 have earned year-end top-50 rankings. Additionally, player Alex Vlaški won the 2003 All-American Championships – the first title for a Husky since 1924 – under his coaching.

Anger was inducted into the USTA Northern California Tennis Hall of Fame in 2005 and the ITA Hall of Fame in 2014.

== Junior Grand Slam finals ==
=== Singles: 1 (1 title) ===
Result	Year	Tournament	Surface	Opponent	Score
Win	1981	Wimbledon	Grass	(Australia) Pat Cash	7–6, 7–5

== ATP career finals ==
=== Singles: 2 (1 title, 1 runner-up) ===
Legend Grand Slam Tournaments (0–0) ATP World Tour Finals (0–0) ATP Masters Series (0–0) ATP Championship Series (0–0) ATP World Series (1–1)	Finals by surface Hard (1–1) Clay (0–0) Grass (0–0) Carpet (0–0)	Finals by setting Outdoors (1–1) Indoors (0–0)

Result	W–L	Date	Tournament	Tier	Surface	Opponent	Score
Win	1–0	Oct 1985	Johannesburg, South Africa	Grand Prix	Hard	(United States) Brad Gilbert	6–4, 3–6, 6–3, 6–2
Loss	1–1	Nov 1986	Johannesburg, South Africa	Grand Prix	Hard	(Israel) Amos Mansdorf	3–6, 6–3, 2–6, 5–7

=== Doubles: 2 (2 titles) ===
Legend Grand Slam Tournaments (0–0) ATP World Tour Finals (0–0) ATP Masters Series (0–0) ATP Championship Series (0–0) ATP World Series (2–0)	Finals by surface Hard (2–0) Clay (0–0) Grass (0–0) Carpet (0–0)	Finals by setting Outdoors (2–0) Indoors (0–0)

Result	W–L	Date	Tournament	Tier	Surface	Partner	Opponents	Score
Win	1–0	Oct 1986	Tokyo, Japan	Grand Prix	Hard	(United States) Ken Flach	(United States) Jimmy Arias (United States) Greg Holmes	6–2, 6–3
Win	2–0	Oct 1987	Brisbane, Australia	Grand Prix	Hard	(New Zealand) Kelly Evernden	(Australia) Broderick Dyke (Australia) Wally Masur	7–6, 6–2

== ATP Challenger and ITF Futures finals ==
=== Doubles: 2 (0–2) ===
Legend ATP Challenger (0–2) ITF Futures (0–0)	Finals by surface Hard (0–2) Clay (0–0) Grass (0–0) Carpet (0–0)

Result	W–L	Date	Tournament	Tier	Surface	Partner	Opponents	Score
Loss	0–1	Jul 1990	Aptos, United States	Challenger	Hard	(South Africa) Marius Barnard	(United States) Jeff Brown (United States) Scott Melville	7–6, 4–6, 4–6
Loss	0–2	Dec 1990	Guam, Guam	Challenger	Hard	(United Kingdom) Andrew Castle	(United States) Steve Devries (United States) Ted Scherman	1–6, 6–3, 6–7

== Performance timelines ==
Key
W	F	SF	QF	#R	RR	Q#	DNQ	A	NH

(W) winner; (F) finalist; (SF) semifinalist; (QF) quarterfinalist; (#R) rounds 4, 3, 2, 1; (RR) round-robin stage; (Q#) qualification round; (DNQ) did not qualify; (A) absent; (NH) not held; (SR) strike rate (events won / competed); (W–L) win–loss record.

=== Singles ===
Tournament	1981	1982	1983	1984	1985	1986	1987	1988	1989	1990	1991	SR	W–L	Win %
Grand Slam tournaments
Australian Open	A	A	3R	2R	3R	A	3R	2R	A	A	A	0 / 5	7–5	58%
French Open	A	A	A	A	A	A	2R	A	A	A	A	0 / 1	1–1	50%
Wimbledon	Q1	Q1	A	A	2R	4R	3R	1R	1R	A	Q1	0 / 5	6–5	55%
US Open	A	A	1R	A	A	4R	1R	1R	A	A	A	0 / 4	3–4	43%
Win–loss	0–0	0–0	2–2	1–1	2–2	6–2	5–4	1–3	0–1	0–0	0–0	0 / 15	17–15	53%
ATP Masters Series
Indian Wells	A	A	A	A	A	A	2R	A	A	A	A	0 / 1	1–1	50%
Miami	A	A	A	A	1R	3R	1R	1R	2R	A	A	0 / 5	3–5	38%
Canada	A	A	A	A	A	1R	A	1R	A	A	A	0 / 2	0–2	0%
Cincinnati	A	A	A	A	1R	2R	1R	A	1R	A	A	0 / 4	1–4	20%
Paris	A	A	A	A	A	1R	A	A	A	A	A	0 / 1	0–1	0%
Win–loss	0–0	0–0	0–0	0–0	0–2	3–4	1–3	0–2	1–2	0–0	0–0	0 / 13	5–13	28%

=== Doubles ===
Tournament	1981	1982	1983	1984	1985	1986	1987	1988	1989	1990	1991	SR	W–L	Win %
Grand Slam tournaments
Australian Open	A	A	A	A	A	A	2R	1R	A	A	A	0 / 2	1–2	33%
French Open	A	A	A	A	A	A	1R	A	A	A	A	0 / 1	0–1	0%
Wimbledon	1R	Q3	A	A	Q3	A	2R	3R	1R	A	Q1	0 / 4	3–4	43%
US Open	A	A	A	A	A	1R	1R	2R	1R	A	A	0 / 4	1–4	20%
Win–loss	0–1	0–0	0–0	0–0	0–0	0–1	2–4	3–3	0–2	0–0	0–0	0 / 11	5–11	31%
ATP Masters Series
Indian Wells	A	A	A	A	A	A	1R	A	1R	A	A	0 / 2	0–2	0%
Miami	A	A	A	A	A	1R	3R	3R	1R	A	A	0 / 4	4–4	50%
Canada	A	A	A	A	A	A	1R	1R	A	A	A	0 / 2	0–2	0%
Cincinnati	A	A	A	A	A	1R	1R	A	2R	A	A	0 / 3	1–3	25%
Win–loss	0–0	0–0	0–0	0–0	0–0	0–2	2–4	2–2	1–3	0–0	0–0	0 / 11	5–11	31%
