= Dan Cassidy =

American tennis player

- Country (sports): United States
- Born: April 29, 1961 (age 64) Hollywood, Florida
- Height: 5 ft 10 in (178 cm)
- Plays: Right-handed
- Prize money: $263,318

Singles
- Career record: 35–74
- Career titles: 1
- Highest ranking: No. 68

Grand Slam singles results
- Australian Open: 3R (1984)
- French Open: 2R (1985)
- Wimbledon: 1R (1985)
- US Open: 2R (1985)

Doubles
- Career record: 41–69
- Career titles: 0
- Highest ranking: No. 56

Grand Slam doubles results
- Australian Open: 3R (1985, 1990)
- French Open: 2R (1988)
- Wimbledon: 1R (1985, 1987)
- US Open: 1R (1984, 1985, 1986)

Dan Cassidy (born April 29, 1961) is a former professional tennis player from the United States. He was born in Hollywood, Florida.

During his career, Cassidy won 1 singles title. He achieved a career-high singles ranking of world No. 68 in 1985 and a career-high doubles ranking of World No. 56 in 1985.

== Grand Prix finals ==
=== Singles (1 win) ===
Result	W-L	Date	Tournament	Surface	Opponent	Score
Win	1–0	Dec 1984	Melbourne Outdoor, Australia	Grass	(Australia) John Fitzgerald	7–6, 7–6

=== Doubles (1 loss) ===
Result	W-L	Date	Tournament	Surface	Partner	Opponents	Score
Loss	0–1	Jul 1986	Boston, U.S.	Clay	(United States) Mel Purcell	(Chile) Hans Gildemeister (Ecuador) Andrés Gómez	6–4, 5–7, 0–6
