= Michael Robertson (tennis) =

South African tennis player

- Country (sports): South Africa
- Born: 2 July 1963 (age 62); Johannesburg, South Africa
- Height: 1.85 m (6 ft 1 in)
- Plays: Right-handed
- College: University of Miami
- Prize money: $218,152

Singles
- Career titles: 0
- Highest ranking: No. 101 (22 August 1988)

Grand Slam singles results
- Australian Open: 1R (1987)
- French Open: 2R (1987)
- Wimbledon: 1R (1986, 1989, 1990)
- US Open: 1R (1988, 1989)

Doubles
- Career titles: 0
- Highest ranking: No. 51 (22 September 1986)

Grand Slam doubles results
- Australian Open: QF (1985)
- French Open: 3R (1986)
- Wimbledon: 3R (1985)
- US Open: QF (1986)

Michael Robertson (born 2 July 1963) is a former South African-American, professional tennis player.

Robertson attended the University of Miami. He was the 1981 French Open Junior doubles winner (with Barry Moir). His best performance in Grand Slam events was Wimbledon 1986, semifinalist mixed doubles (with Elna Reinach), US Open 1986 quarterfinalist men's doubles (with Tomm Warneke) and 1985 Australian Open quarterfinalist men's doubles (with John Letts).

== Career finals ==
=== Doubles (1 runner-up) ===
Result	W/L	Date	Tournament	Surface	Partner	Opponents	Score
Loss	0–1	Oct 1985	Tel Aviv, Israel	Hard	(Romania) Florin Segărceanu	(United States) Brad Gilbert (Romania) Ilie Năstase	3–6, 2–6
