= 1993 Stella Artois Championships – Singles =

Singles
- 1993 Stella Artois Championships

Final
- Champion: (Germany) Michael Stich
- Runner-up: (South Africa) Wayne Ferreira
- Score: 6–3, 6–4

Details
- Draw: 56
- Seeds: 16

Events
Singles	Doubles
← 1992 ·	Queen's Club Championships	· 1994 →

Wayne Ferreira was the defending champion but lost in the final 6–3, 6–4 against Michael Stich.

== Seeds ==
The top eight seeds received a bye to the second round.

1. (United States) Pete Sampras (second round)
2. (Sweden) Stefan Edberg (quarterfinals)
3. (Germany) Boris Becker (quarterfinals)
4. (Croatia) Goran Ivanišević (second round)
5. (United States) Ivan Lendl (second round)
6. (Germany) Michael Stich (champion)
7. (South Africa) Wayne Ferreira (final)
8. (Australia) Mark Woodforde (third round)
9. (South Africa) Marcos Ondruska (third round)
10. (United States) Brad Gilbert (first round)
11. (United States) Todd Martin (semifinals)
12. (United States) David Wheaton (third round)
13. (Switzerland) Jakob Hlasek (first round)
14. (France) Guillaume Raoux (third round)
15. (United States) Richey Reneberg (third round)
16. (Germany) Marc-Kevin Goellner (quarterfinals)

== Draw ==
=== Key ===
- Q = Qualifier
- WC = Wild card
- LL = Lucky loser
- Alt = Alternate
- SE = Special exempt
- PR = Protected ranking
- ITF = ITF entry
- JE = Junior exempt
- w/o = Walkover
- r = Retired
- d = Defaulted
- SR = Special ranking

=== Finals ===
Semifinals
7	(South Africa) Wayne Ferreira	6^{2}	6	7
11	(United States) Todd Martin	7^{7}	3	5
6	(Germany) Michael Stich	5	6	8
(Australia) Jamie Morgan	7	4	6

Final
7	(South Africa) Wayne Ferreira	3	4
6	(Germany) Michael Stich	6	6

=== Top half ===
==== Section 1 ====
First round
(United States) K Thorne	4	6^{2}
(South Africa) G Stafford	6	7^{7}
WC	(United Kingdom) M Petchey	3	4
(France) S Simian	6	6
(United States) T Ho	3	4
16	(Germany) M Goellner	6	6
9	(South Africa) M Ondruska	4	6	6
WC	(United Kingdom) A Foster	6	1	4
(Mexico) L Herrera	7^{7}	7
(France) O Delaître	6^{5}	5
Q	(Sweden) J Björkman	3	6	4
(Austria) A Antonitsch	6	3	6

Second round
1	(United States) P Sampras	7	5	4
(South Africa) G Stafford	5	7	6
(France) S Simian	2	7^{7}	3
16	(Germany) M Goellner	6	6^{3}	6
9	(South Africa) M Ondruska	6	6
(Mexico) L Herrera	2	3
(Austria) A Antonitsch	6	2	4
7	(South Africa) W Ferreira	4	6	6

Third round
(South Africa) G Stafford	4	3
16	(Germany) M Goellner	6	6
9	(South Africa) M Ondruska	2	1
7	(South Africa) W Ferreira	6	6

Quarterfinals
16	(Germany) M Goellner	4	2
7	(South Africa) W Ferreira	6	6

==== Section 2 ====
First round
(United States) J Palmer	6	6^{5}	3
WC	(United Kingdom) C Wilkinson	2	7^{7}	6
(South Africa) C van Rensburg	3	6^{5}
Q	(United States) D Witt	6	7^{7}
Q	(United Kingdom) R Matheson	6	7^{7}
WC/13	(Switzerland) J Hlasek	3	6^{4}
11	(United States) T Martin	6	6
Q	(Canada) S Lareau	2	3
(Australia) N Borwick	6^{9}	3
(Japan) S Matsuoka	7^{11}	6
(Sweden) A Järryd	2	6^{1}
(Zimbabwe) B Black	6	7^{7}

Second round
4	(Croatia) G Ivanišević	3	6	3
WC	(United Kingdom) C Wilkinson	6	3	6
Q	(United States) D Witt	6	6
Q	(United Kingdom) R Matheson	3	4
11	(United States) T Martin	6	7^{7}
(Japan) S Matsuoka	3	6^{1}
(Zimbabwe) B Black	6	7^{13}
5	(United States) I Lendl	2	6^{11}

Third round
WC	(United Kingdom) C Wilkinson	6	5	3
Q	(United States) D Witt	3	7	6
11	(United States) T Martin	7^{7}	6
(Zimbabwe) B Black	6^{5}	2

Quarterfinals
Q	(United States) D Witt	4	2
11	(United States) T Martin	6	6

=== Bottom half ===
==== Section 3 ====
First round
(Germany) P Kühnen	6	4	0
(United Kingdom) J Bates	4	6	6
(Australia) J Stoltenberg	6	6
(United States) C Garner	2	1
(Venezuela) N Pereira	2	6	5
12	(United States) D Wheaton	6	4	7
14	(France) G Raoux	7	6
(Colombia) M Hadad	5	1
(Australia) T Woodbridge	5	6	6
(Germany) J Renzenbrink	7	2	0
(Germany) K Braasch	6^{3}	6	5
(United States) C Adams	7^{7}	4	7

Second round
6	(Germany) M Stich	6	6
(United Kingdom) J Bates	3	2
(Australia) J Stoltenberg	7	6^{5}	4
12	(United States) D Wheaton	5	7^{7}	6
14	(France) G Raoux	3	6	6
(Australia) T Woodbridge	6	4	4
(United States) C Adams	1	3
3	(Germany) B Becker	6	6

Third round
6	(Germany) M Stich	6	6
12	(United States) D Wheaton	4	3
14	(France) G Raoux	4	4
3	(Germany) B Becker	6	6

Quarterfinals
6	(Germany) M Stich	6	7^{7}
3	(Germany) B Becker	4	6^{2}

==== Section 4 ====
First round
Q	(Australia) M Tebbutt	6	6
WC	(United Kingdom) C Bailey	3	4
Q	(United States) D Pate	2	3
(Australia) J Morgan	6	6
(Argentina) J Frana	6	5	6
10	(United States) B Gilbert	4	7	3
15	(United States) R Reneberg	6	5	6
(Canada) C Pridham	3	7	3
Q	(Italy) L Tieleman	4	7^{7}	6
(Australia) S Stolle	6	6^{1}	4
(United States) A O'Brien	6	5	6
(New Zealand) B Steven	1	7	8

Second round
8	(Australia) M Woodforde	6	6
Q	(Australia) M Tebbutt	4	2
(Australia) J Morgan	4	6	9
(Argentina) J Frana	6	3	7
15	(United States) R Reneberg	6	7
Q	(Italy) L Tieleman	1	5
(New Zealand) B Steven	4	6^{10}
2	(Sweden) S Edberg	6	7^{12}

Third round
8	(Australia) M Woodforde	4	6	6
(Australia) J Morgan	6	1	8
15	(United States) R Reneberg	6^{3}	6	2
2	(Sweden) S Edberg	7^{7}	3	6

Quarterfinals
(Australia) J Morgan	4	7^{11}	6
2	(Sweden) S Edberg	6	6^{9}	3
