= 1988 Stella Artois Championships – Doubles =

Doubles
- 1988 Stella Artois Championships

Final
- Champions: (United States) Ken Flach (United States) Robert Seguso
- Runners-up: (South Africa) Pieter Aldrich (South Africa) Danie Visser
- Score: 6–2, 7–6

Details
- Draw: 32

Events
Singles	Doubles
← 1987 ·	Queen's Club Championships	· 1989 →

Guy Forget and Yannick Noah were the defending champions but only Forget competed that year with Henri Leconte.

Forget and Leconte lost in the semifinals to Ken Flach and Robert Seguso.

Flach and Seguso won in the final 6–2, 7–6 against Pieter Aldrich and Danie Visser.

== Seeds ==
1. (United States) Ken Flach / (United States) Robert Seguso (champions)
2. (United States) Kevin Curren / (United States) David Pate (second round)
3. (Sweden) Stefan Edberg / (United States) Rick Leach (quarterfinals)
4. (New Zealand) Kelly Evernden / (United States) Johan Kriek (quarterfinals)
5. (South Africa) Christo van Rensburg / (Socialist Federal Republic of Yugoslavia) Slobodan Živojinović (second round)
6. (France) Guy Forget / (France) Henri Leconte (semifinals)
7. (Australia) Pat Cash / (Australia) John Fitzgerald (second round)
8. (United States) Martin Davis / (Australia) Brad Drewett (second round)

== Draw ==
=== Key ===
- Q = Qualifier
- WC = Wild card
- LL = Lucky loser
- Alt = Alternate
- SE = Special exempt
- PR = Protected ranking
- ITF = ITF entry
- JE = Junior exempt
- w/o = Walkover
- r = Retired
- d = Defaulted
- SR = Special ranking

=== Final ===
Semifinals
1	(United States) Ken Flach (United States) Robert Seguso	7	4	8
6	(France) Guy Forget (France) Henri Leconte	6	6	6
(Canada) Grant Connell (Canada) Glenn Michibata	6	6	10
(South Africa) Pieter Aldrich (South Africa) Danie Visser	2	7	12

Final
1	(United States) Ken Flach (United States) Robert Seguso	6	7
(South Africa) Pieter Aldrich (South Africa) Danie Visser	2	6

=== Top half ===
First round
1	(United States) K Flach (United States) R Seguso	4	6	9
(United States) M Flur (United States) S Giammalva Jr.	6	4	7
WC	(Israel) A Mansdorf (United Kingdom) S Shaw	2	6	6
WC	(United Kingdom) D Felgate (United Kingdom) N Fulwood	6	3	8
(Australia) W Masur (Australia) M Woodforde	3	7	4
(Australia) D Cahill (Australia) S Youl	6	6	6
(Australia) P Doohan (United States) J Grabb	6	3	4
8	(United States) M Davis (Australia) B Drewett	3	6	6
3	(Sweden) S Edberg (United States) R Leach	6	7
(United States) P Fleming (United States) L Shiras	3	5
(Argentina) J Frana (South Africa) G Muller	6	7
(Australia) P Carter (United States) E Korita	3	6
(Australia) J Stoltenberg (Australia) T Woodbridge	4	7	0
(Australia) C Limberger (United States) L Scott	6	5	6
(Australia) B Dyke (United States) T Pawsat	5	4
6	(France) G Forget (France) H Leconte	7	6

Second round
1	(United States) K Flach (United States) R Seguso	6	4	6
WC	(United Kingdom) D Felgate (United Kingdom) N Fulwood	3	6	0
(Australia) D Cahill (Australia) S Youl	6	6
8	(United States) M Davis (Australia) B Drewett	3	4
3	(Sweden) S Edberg (United States) R Leach	7	6
(Argentina) J Frana (South Africa) G Muller	6	3
(Australia) C Limberger (United States) L Scott	3	5
6	(France) G Forget (France) H Leconte	6	7

Quarterfinals
1	(United States) K Flach (United States) R Seguso	6	6
(Australia) D Cahill (Australia) S Youl	4	1
3	(Sweden) S Edberg (United States) R Leach	4	6	4
6	(France) G Forget (France) H Leconte	6	4	6

Semifinals
1	(United States) K Flach (United States) R Seguso	7	4	8
6	(France) G Forget (France) H Leconte	6	6	6

=== Bottom half ===
First round
5	(South Africa) C van Rensburg (Socialist Federal Republic of Yugoslavia) S Živojinović	7	6
(United States) A Kohlberg (United States) R Van't Hof	6	4
(West Germany) B Becker (West Germany) E Jelen	4	6	3
(Canada) G Connell (Canada) G Michibata	6	4	6
(United States) K Jones (West Germany) P Kühnen	3	4
(United States) M Anger (United States) G Layendecker	6	6
(United States) S Denton (Australia) L Warder	4	4
4	(New Zealand) K Evernden (United States) J Kriek	6	6
7	(Australia) P Cash (Australia) J Fitzgerald	7	5	6
(South Africa) E Edwards (United States) T Wilkison	6	7	1
(United States) C Hooper (United States) B Pearce	6	6	6
(United States) M De Palmer (United States) G Donnelly	4	7	3
(Chile) R Acuña (United States) S Davis	6	6
(South Africa) P Aldrich (South Africa) D Visser	7	7
LL	(United States) M Basham (United States) C Beckman	6	4
2	(United States) K Curren (United States) D Pate	7	6

Second round
5	(South Africa) C van Rensburg (Socialist Federal Republic of Yugoslavia) S Živojinović	4	4
(Canada) G Connell (Canada) G Michibata	6	6
(United States) M Anger (United States) G Layendecker	4	4
4	(New Zealand) K Evernden (United States) J Kriek	6	6
7	(Australia) P Cash (Australia) J Fitzgerald	1	6
(United States) C Hooper (United States) B Pearce	6	7
(South Africa) P Aldrich (South Africa) D Visser	6	6
2	(United States) K Curren (United States) D Pate	2	3

Quarterfinals
(Canada) G Connell (Canada) G Michibata	6	2	10
4	(New Zealand) K Evernden (United States) J Kriek	4	6	8
(United States) C Hooper (United States) B Pearce	3	2
(South Africa) P Aldrich (South Africa) D Visser	6	6

Semifinals
(Canada) G Connell (Canada) G Michibata	6	6	10
(South Africa) P Aldrich (South Africa) D Visser	2	7	12
