= 1990 Stella Artois Championships – Singles =

Singles
- 1990 Stella Artois Championships

Final
- Champion: (Czechoslovakia) Ivan Lendl
- Runner-up: (West Germany) Boris Becker
- Score: 6–3, 6–2

Details
- Draw: 56
- Seeds: 16

Events
Singles	Doubles
← 1989 ·	Queen's Club Championships	· 1991 →

Ivan Lendl was the defending champion and won in the final 6–3, 6–2 against Boris Becker.

== Seeds ==
The top eight seeds received a bye to the second round.

1. (Czechoslovakia) Ivan Lendl (champion)
2. (Sweden) Stefan Edberg (semifinals)
3. (West Germany) Boris Becker (final)
4. (United States) John McEnroe (semifinals)
5. (United States) Tim Mayotte (second round)
6. (United States) Pete Sampras (third round)
7. (France) Guy Forget (third round)
8. (Australia) Wally Masur (second round)
9. (South Africa) Christo van Rensburg (quarterfinals)
10. (France) Henri Leconte (first round)
11. (United States) David Wheaton (quarterfinals)
12. (Australia) Richard Fromberg (quarterfinals)
13. (United States) Kevin Curren (second round)
14. (Austria) Alex Antonitsch (third round)
15. (United States) Scott Davis (third round)
16. (Australia) Mark Kratzmann (first round)

== Draw ==
=== Key ===
- Q = Qualifier
- WC = Wild card
- LL = Lucky loser
- Alt = Alternate
- SE = Special exempt
- PR = Protected ranking
- ITF = ITF entry
- JE = Junior exempt
- w/o = Walkover
- r = Retired
- d = Defaulted
- SR = Special ranking

=== Finals ===
Semifinals
1	(Czechoslovakia) Ivan Lendl	6	6
4	(United States) John McEnroe	2	4
3	(West Germany) Boris Becker	6	6
2	(Sweden) Stefan Edberg	4	4

Final
1	(Czechoslovakia) Ivan Lendl	6	6
3	(West Germany) Boris Becker	3	2

=== Top half ===
==== Section 1 ====
First round
WC	(United Kingdom) C Bailey	6^{2}	3
(Australia) S Youl	7^{7}	6
(United States) T Wilkison	7	6
(United States) B Garrow	5	3
(Australia) J Fitzgerald	2	7^{7}	1
15	(United States) S Davis	6	6^{3}	6
10	(France) H Leconte	1	7^{7}	1
(United States) D Pate	6	6^{3}	6
(United States) J Rive	5	6^{4}
(United States) L Shiras	7	7^{7}
(Canada) G Connell	6	6
Q	(Portugal) N Marques	3	4

Second round
1	(Czechoslovakia) I Lendl	6	6
(Australia) S Youl	4	2
(United States) T Wilkison	3	5
15	(United States) S Davis	6	7
(United States) D Pate	6	6
(United States) L Shiras	3	4
(Canada) G Connell	6^{4}	4
7	(France) G Forget	7^{7}	6

Third round
1	(Czechoslovakia) I Lendl	6	6
15	(United States) S Davis	0	3
(United States) D Pate	6	6
7	(France) G Forget	1	3

Quarterfinals
1	(Czechoslovakia) I Lendl	6	6
(United States) D Pate	2	4

==== Section 2 ====
First round
(India) R Krishnan	6	6
(United States) M Washington	1	3
(Australia) J Anderson	6	6^{4}	4
(Finland) V Paloheimo	4	7^{7}	6
(Socialist Federal Republic of Yugoslavia) S Živojinović	3	6^{3}
13	(United States) K Curren	6	7^{7}
12	(Australia) R Fromberg	7^{7}	6
WC	(United Kingdom) M Petchey	6^{5}	3
Q	(Mexico) L Lavalle	1	6	7
(United States) B Pearce	6	4	9
(Sweden) P Lundgren	4	4
Q	(South Africa) M Kaplan	6	6

Second round
4	(United States) J McEnroe	4	6	6
(India) R Krishnan	6	4	2
(Finland) V Paloheimo	4	6	9
13	(United States) K Curren	6	4	7
12	(Australia) R Fromberg	7^{8}	6
(United States) B Pearce	6^{6}	2
Q	(South Africa) M Kaplan	1	4
6	(United States) P Sampras	6	6

Third round
4	(United States) J McEnroe	6	6^{5}	7
(Finland) V Paloheimo	0	7^{7}	5
12	(Australia) R Fromberg	3	6	10
6	(United States) P Sampras	6	4	8

Quarterfinals
4	(United States) J McEnroe	6^{0}	6	7
12	(Australia) R Fromberg	7^{7}	3	5

=== Bottom half ===
==== Section 3 ====
First round
(West Germany) E Jelen	3	3
(Australia) J Stoltenberg	6	6
(Sweden) A Järryd	4	4
(West Germany) P Kühnen	6	6
Q	(South Africa) W Ferreira	1	4
11	(United States) D Wheaton	6	6
14	(Austria) A Antonitsch	2	6	6
(United Kingdom) J Bates	6	3	4
(Australia) T Woodbridge	6^{6}	3
Q	(Australia) B Dyke	7^{8}	6
(United States) P Chamberlin	6	1	6
WC	(Australia) P Cash	4	6	4

Second round
5	(United States) T Mayotte	1^{r}
(Australia) J Stoltenberg	4
(West Germany) P Kühnen	6	4	1
11	(United States) D Wheaton	4	6	6
14	(Austria) A Antonitsch	6	6
Q	(Australia) B Dyke	2	3
(United States) P Chamberlin	4	4
3	(West Germany) B Becker	6	6

Third round
(Australia) J Stoltenberg	3	4
11	(United States) D Wheaton	6	6
14	(Austria) A Antonitsch	6	1	7
3	(West Germany) B Becker	3	6	9

Quarterfinals
11	(United States) D Wheaton	3	3
3	(West Germany) B Becker	6	6

==== Section 4 ====
First round
WC	(United Kingdom) D Sapsford	6	6
(United States) B Shelton	4	2
Q	(France) G Raoux	4	6^{4}
(Australia) D Cahill	6	7^{7}
Q	(Canada) C Pridham	6	3	3
9	(South Africa) C van Rensburg	3	6	6
16	(Australia) M Kratzmann	7	3	6
(Sweden) N Kroon	5	6	8
(South Africa) G Muller	1	7	2
(United States) D Rostagno	6	5	6
(United States) P Annacone	4	6	3
(West Germany) M Zoecke	6	3	6

Second round
8	(Australia) W Masur	7	4	6
WC	(United Kingdom) D Sapsford	5	6	8
(Australia) D Cahill	3	6^{6}
9	(South Africa) C van Rensburg	6	7^{8}
(Sweden) N Kroon	7	7^{7}
(United States) D Rostagno	5	6^{2}
(West Germany) M Zoecke	0	3
2	(Sweden) S Edberg	6	6

Third round
WC	(United Kingdom) D Sapsford	1	1
9	(South Africa) C van Rensburg	6	6
(Sweden) N Kroon	3	0
2	(Sweden) S Edberg	6	6

Quarterfinals
9	(South Africa) C van Rensburg	5	3
2	(Sweden) S Edberg	7	6
