= 1991 Stella Artois Championships – Singles =

Singles
- 1991 Stella Artois Championships

Final
- Champion: (Sweden) Stefan Edberg
- Runner-up: (United States) David Wheaton
- Score: 6–2, 6–3

Details
- Draw: 56
- Seeds: 16

Events
Singles	Doubles
← 1990 ·	Queen's Club Championships	· 1992 →

Ivan Lendl was the defending champion but lost in the second round to Grant Connell.

Stefan Edberg won in the final 6–2, 6–3 against David Wheaton.

== Seeds ==
The top eight seeds received a bye to the second round.

1. (Sweden) Stefan Edberg (champion)
2. (Czechoslovakia) Ivan Lendl (second round)
3. (United States) Pete Sampras (second round)
4. (United States) Michael Chang (quarterfinals)
5. (United States) Derrick Rostagno (second round)
6. (United States) David Wheaton (final)
7. (Sweden) Anders Järryd (semifinals)
8. (Australia) Todd Woodbridge (third round)
9. (United States) Kevin Curren (second round)
10. (Germany) Eric Jelen (second round)
11. (Sweden) Mats Wilander (first round)
12. (Australia) Wally Masur (first round)
13. (United States) Scott Davis (first round)
14. (United States) Todd Witsken (second round)
15. (Finland) Veli Paloheimo (first round)
16. (Australia) Mark Woodforde (first round)

== Draw ==
=== Key ===
- Q = Qualifier
- WC = Wild card
- LL = Lucky loser
- Alt = Alternate
- ITF = ITF entry
- PR = Protected ranking
- SR = Special ranking
- SE = Special exempt
- JE = Junior exempt
- JR = Junior Accelerator Programme entrant
- CO = College Accelerator Programme entrant
- NG = Next Gen Accelerator Program entrant
- w/o = Walkover
- r = Retired
- d = Defaulted

=== Finals ===
Semifinals
1	(Sweden) Stefan Edberg	6	6
(United States) MaliVai Washington	4	2
6	(United States) David Wheaton	6	6
7	(Sweden) Anders Järryd	3	4

Final
1	(Sweden) Stefan Edberg	6	6
6	(United States) David Wheaton	2	3

=== Top half ===
==== Section 1 ====
First round
(United States) D Goldie	6	5	2
(France) A Boetsch	4	7	6
(Australia) M Kratzmann	2	3
(Australia) J Stoltenberg	6	6
(Sweden) P Lundgren	6	6
15	(Finland) V Paloheimo	4	4
9	(United States) K Curren	3	6	6
Q	(Italy) G Pozzi	6	1	3
Q	(Philippines) F Barrientos	1	4
(Australia) P Cash	6	6
(Australia) J Morgan	1	2
(South Africa) W Ferreira	6	6

Second round
1	(Sweden) S Edberg	6	6
(France) A Boetsch	4	3
(Australia) J Stoltenberg	6	6
(Sweden) P Lundgren	1	4
9	(United States) K Curren	4	1
(Australia) P Cash	6	6
(South Africa) W Ferreira	6^{5}	7	4
8	(Australia) T Woodbridge	7^{7}	5	6

Third round
1	(Sweden) S Edberg	6	6
(Australia) J Stoltenberg	4	4
(Australia) P Cash	6	6
8	(Australia) T Woodbridge	2	1

Quarterfinals
1	(Sweden) S Edberg	6	6
(Australia) P Cash	3	4

==== Section 2 ====
First round
Q	(United States) M Keil	6	7^{7}
(Germany) P Baur	2	6^{2}
(United States) D Pate	4	2
WC	(United Kingdom) J Bates	6	6
(United States) M Washington	7^{8}	6
13	(United States) S Davis	6^{6}	4
12	(Australia) W Masur	2	6^{5}
(South Africa) C van Rensburg	6	7^{7}
(India) R Krishnan	6	6^{1}	6
(Brazil) L Mattar	1	7^{7}	3
WC	(United Kingdom) C Bailey	4	2
WC	(Australia) J Fitzgerald	6	6

Second round
3	(United States) P Sampras	2	6^{2}
Q	(United States) M Keil	6	7^{7}
WC	(United Kingdom) J Bates	5	1
(United States) M Washington	7	6
(South Africa) C van Rensburg	6	6^{1}	6
(India) R Krishnan	2	7^{7}	3
WC	(Australia) J Fitzgerald	6	6
5	(United States) D Rostagno	4	4

Third round
Q	(United States) M Keil	7^{7}	3	2
(United States) M Washington	6^{3}	6	6
(South Africa) C van Rensburg	7^{7}	4	4
WC	(Australia) J Fitzgerald	6^{4}	6	6

Quarterfinals
(United States) M Washington	7	6
WC	(Australia) J Fitzgerald	5	4

=== Bottom half ===
==== Section 3 ====
First round
Q	(Zimbabwe) B Black	6	7^{7}
(United States) J Grabb	2	6^{5}
Q	(Argentina) J Frana	6	6
Q	(Canada) G Michibata	1	2
(Germany) P Kühnen	6	6
11	(Sweden) M Wilander	4	4
14	(United States) T Witsken	7	6
(Mexico) L Herrera	5	2
(Sweden) N Kroon	2	1
(France) G Raoux	6	6
(Austria) A Antonitsch	3	1^{r}
WC	(United Kingdom) D Sapsford	6	2

Second round
6	(United States) D Wheaton	6	3	6
Q	(Zimbabwe) B Black	1	6	3
Q	(Argentina) J Frana	7^{7}	4	4
(Germany) P Kühnen	6^{2}	6	6
14	(United States) T Witsken	4	4
(France) G Raoux	6	6
WC	(United Kingdom) D Sapsford	3	3
4	(United States) M Chang	6	6

Third round
6	(United States) D Wheaton	6	7
(Germany) P Kühnen	4	5
(France) G Raoux	5	2
4	(United States) M Chang	7	6

Quarterfinals
6	(United States) D Wheaton	6	6
4	(United States) M Chang	3	3

==== Section 4 ====
First round
(United States) B Pearce	6	5
(Sweden) T Högstedt	1	5^{r}
(Brazil) J Oncins	3	6	7
WC	(United Kingdom) A Castle	6	3	5
(United States) J Tarango	3	7	7
10	(Germany) E Jelen	6	5	9
16	(Australia) M Woodforde	4	7	8
(France) R Gilbert	6	5	10
(South Africa) G Muller	6^{4}	6^{9}
(Japan) S Matsuoka	7^{7}	7^{11}
(Canada) G Connell	7^{7}	2	6
Q	(Canada) M Laurendeau	6^{5}	6	4

Second round
7	(Sweden) A Järryd	6	3	6
(United States) B Pearce	3	6	3
(Brazil) J Oncins	3	6	6
10	(Germany) E Jelen	6	2	3
(France) R Gilbert	3	2
(Japan) S Matsuoka	6	6
(Canada) G Connell	5	6	6
2	(Czechoslovakia) I Lendl	7	3	4

Third round
7	(Sweden) A Järryd	6	6
(Brazil) J Oncins	2	1
(Japan) S Matsuoka	4	5
(Canada) G Connell	6	7

Quarterfinals
7	(Sweden) A Järryd	6	6
(Canada) G Connell	2	1
