= 1992 Stella Artois Championships – Doubles =

Doubles
- 1992 Stella Artois Championships

Final
- Champions: (Australia) John Fitzgerald (Sweden) Anders Järryd
- Runners-up: (Croatia) Goran Ivanišević (Italy) Diego Nargiso
- Score: 6–4, 7–6

Details
- Draw: 28
- Seeds: 8

Events
Singles	Doubles
← 1991 ·	Queen's Club Championships	· 1993 →

Todd Woodbridge and Mark Woodforde were the defending champions but lost in the quarterfinals to Goran Ivanišević and Diego Nargiso.

John Fitzgerald and Anders Järryd won in the final 6–4, 7–6 against Ivanišević and Nargiso.

== Seeds ==
The top four seeded teams received byes into the second round.

1. (Australia) John Fitzgerald / (Sweden) Anders Järryd (champions)
2. (Australia) Todd Woodbridge / (Australia) Mark Woodforde (quarterfinals)
3. (Canada) Grant Connell / (Canada) Glenn Michibata (semifinals)
4. (United States) Kelly Jones / (United States) Rick Leach (semifinals)
5. (Argentina) Javier Frana / (Mexico) Leonardo Lavalle (first round)
6. (United States) Steve DeVries / (Australia) David Macpherson (second round)
7. (United States) Luke Jensen / (Australia) Laurie Warder (first round)
8. (South Africa) Wayne Ferreira / (South Africa) Piet Norval (first round)

== Draw ==
=== Key ===
- Q = Qualifier
- WC = Wild card
- LL = Lucky loser
- Alt = Alternate
- SE = Special exempt
- PR = Protected ranking
- ITF = ITF entry
- JE = Junior exempt
- w/o = Walkover
- r = Retired
- d = Defaulted
- SR = Special ranking

=== Finals ===
Semifinals
1	(Australia) John Fitzgerald (Sweden) Anders Järryd	6	2	6
4	(United States) Kelly Jones (United States) Rick Leach	3	6	4
3	(Canada) Grant Connell (Canada) Glenn Michibata	4	4
(Croatia) Goran Ivanišević (Italy) Diego Nargiso	6	6

Final
1	(Australia) John Fitzgerald (Sweden) Anders Järryd	6	7
(Croatia) Goran Ivanišević (Italy) Diego Nargiso	4	6

=== Top half ===
First round
(Australia) M Kratzmann (Australia) W Masur	4	7	7
(United States) K Curren (South Africa) G Muller	6	5	5
Q	(Brazil) D Marcelino (Brazil) F Roese	4	6
(United States) M Keil (United States) D Randall	6	7
(United States) J Palmer (United States) D Pate	6	6	6
8	(South Africa) W Ferreira (South Africa) P Norval	4	7	3
(United States) B Pearce (South Africa) B Talbot	3	6	6
WC	(Sweden) S Edberg (United States) P Sampras	6	4	2
(United States) M Briggs (United States) T Kronemann	6	4	7
(United States) P Galbraith (United States) P McEnroe	3	6	5
(Sweden) R Båthman (Sweden) R Bergh	4	3
6	(United States) S DeVries (Australia) D Macpherson	6	6

Second round
1	(Australia) J Fitzgerald (Sweden) A Järryd	5	7	6
(Australia) M Kratzmann (Australia) W Masur	7	6	3
(United States) M Keil (United States) D Randall	4	7	6
(United States) J Palmer (United States) D Pate	6	6	2
4	(United States) K Jones (United States) R Leach	6	6
(United States) B Pearce (South Africa) B Talbot	4	4
(United States) P Galbraith (United States) P McEnroe	6	7
6	(United States) S DeVries (Australia) D Macpherson	4	6

Quarterfinals
1	(Australia) J Fitzgerald (Sweden) A Järryd	3	6	6
(United States) M Keil (United States) D Randall	6	1	4
4	(United States) K Jones (United States) R Leach	6	6
(United States) P Galbraith (United States) P McEnroe	1	3

Semifinals
1	(Australia) J Fitzgerald (Sweden) A Järryd	6	2	6
4	(United States) K Jones (United States) R Leach	3	6	4

=== Bottom half ===
First round
5	(Argentina) J Frana (Mexico) L Lavalle	3	2
(France) G Forget (Switzerland) J Hlasek	6	6
(United States) G Layendecker (United States) T Witsken	6	3	4
WC	(Germany) B Becker (Germany) P Kühnen	4	6	6
Q	(United Kingdom) A Foster (United Kingdom) D Sapsford	6	6
WC	(United Kingdom) D Ison (United Kingdom) M Petchey	4	4
7	(United States) L Jensen (Australia) L Warder	3	3
(Croatia) G Ivanišević (Italy) D Nargiso	6	6
WC	(United Kingdom) J Bates (Czechoslovakia) I Lendl	6	6
(South Africa) P Aldrich (United Kingdom) N Broad	3	2
(South Africa) S Kruger (United States) F Montana	6	3	3
(United States) T Nelson (Australia) J Stoltenberg	4	6	6

Second round
(France) G Forget (Switzerland) J Hlasek	4	5
WC	(Germany) B Becker (Germany) P Kühnen	6	7
Q	(United Kingdom) A Foster (United Kingdom) D Sapsford	2	6
3	(Canada) G Connell (Canada) G Michibata	6	7
(Croatia) G Ivanišević (Italy) D Nargiso	5	6	7
WC	(United Kingdom) J Bates (Czechoslovakia) I Lendl	7	4	5
(United States) T Nelson (Australia) J Stoltenberg	4	5
2	(Australia) T Woodbridge (Australia) M Woodforde	6	7

Quarterfinals
WC	(Germany) B Becker (Germany) P Kühnen	6	6	14
3	(Canada) G Connell (Canada) G Michibata	7	2	16
(Croatia) G Ivanišević (Italy) D Nargiso	7	6
2	(Australia) T Woodbridge (Australia) M Woodforde	5	4

Semifinals
3	(Canada) G Connell (Canada) G Michibata	4	4
(Croatia) G Ivanišević (Italy) D Nargiso	6	6
