= 1989 Stella Artois Championships – Doubles =

Doubles
- 1989 Stella Artois Championships

Final
- Champions: (Australia) Darren Cahill (Australia) Mark Kratzmann
- Runners-up: (United States) Tim Pawsat (Australia) Laurie Warder
- Score: 7–6, 6–3

Details
- Draw: 32

Events
Singles	Doubles
← 1988 ·	Queen's Club Championships	· 1990 →

Ken Flach and Robert Seguso were the defending champions but lost in the first round to Tim Pawsat and Laurie Warder.

Darren Cahill and Mark Kratzmann won in the final 7–6, 6–3 against Pawsat and Warder.

== Seeds ==
1. (United States) Ken Flach / (United States) Robert Seguso (first round)
2. (Australia) John Fitzgerald / (Australia) Mark Woodforde (second round)
3. (United States) Kevin Curren / (United States) David Pate (first round)
4. (United States) Paul Annacone / (South Africa) Christo van Rensburg (first round)
5. (South Africa) Pieter Aldrich / (South Africa) Danie Visser (first round)
6. (Sweden) Stefan Edberg / (United States) Rick Leach (first round)
7. (United States) Scott Davis / (United States) Tim Wilkison (second round)
8. (Canada) Grant Connell / (Canada) Glenn Michibata (first round)

== Draw ==
=== Key ===
- Q = Qualifier
- WC = Wild card
- LL = Lucky loser
- Alt = Alternate
- ITF = ITF entry
- PR = Protected ranking
- SR = Special ranking
- SE = Special exempt
- JE = Junior exempt
- JR = Junior Accelerator Programme entrant
- CO = College Accelerator Programme entrant
- NG = Next Gen Accelerator Program entrant
- w/o = Walkover
- r = Retired
- d = Defaulted

=== Finals ===
Semifinals
(United States) Tim Pawsat (Australia) Laurie Warder	6	4	6
(United States) Jim Courier (United States) Pete Sampras	1	6	3
(Australia) Darren Cahill (Australia) Mark Kratzmann	2	6	6
(United States) Matt Anger (United States) Robert Van't Hof	6	3	1

Final
(United States) Tim Pawsat (Australia) Laurie Warder	6	3
(Australia) Darren Cahill (Australia) Mark Kratzmann	7	6

=== Top half ===
First round
1	(United States) K Flach (United States) R Seguso	5	3
(United States) T Pawsat (Australia) L Warder	7	6
(United States) J Rive (United States) L Shiras	6	6	11
(Soviet Union) A Olhovskiy (United States) D Wheaton	3	7	9
(United States) T Siegel (Australia) S Youl	6	3
(United States) P Chamberlin (South Africa) G Muller	7	6
(United States) L Jensen (United States) K Jones	4	6
7	(United States) S Davis (United States) T Wilkison	6	7
4	(United States) P Annacone (South Africa) C van Rensburg	6	6
(United States) S Giammalva Jr. (United States) G Layendecker	7	7
(Australia) J Stoltenberg (Australia) T Woodbridge	6	3	8
WC	(Czechoslovakia) I Lendl (Israel) A Mansdorf	4	6	10
WC	(United States) T Nelson (Sweden) M Wilander	6	6
(West Germany) C Saceanu (West Germany) M Stich	4	2
(United States) J Courier (United States) P Sampras	6	6
5	(South Africa) P Aldrich (South Africa) D Visser	3	4

Second round
(United States) T Pawsat (Australia) L Warder	6	6
(United States) J Rive (United States) L Shiras	2	3
(United States) P Chamberlin (South Africa) G Muller	3	7	6
7	(United States) S Davis (United States) T Wilkison	6	6	2
(United States) S Giammalva Jr. (United States) G Layendecker	4	4
WC	(Czechoslovakia) I Lendl (Israel) A Mansdorf	6	6
WC	(United States) T Nelson (Sweden) M Wilander	3	3
(United States) J Courier (United States) P Sampras	6	6

Quarterfinals
(United States) T Pawsat (Australia) L Warder	7	3	6
(United States) P Chamberlin (South Africa) G Muller	6	6	1
WC	(Czechoslovakia) I Lendl (Israel) A Mansdorf	4	7	2
(United States) J Courier (United States) P Sampras	6	6	6

Semifinals
(United States) T Pawsat (Australia) L Warder	6	4	6
(United States) J Courier (United States) P Sampras	1	6	3

=== Bottom half ===
First round
6	(Sweden) S Edberg (United States) R Leach	6	6
(United Kingdom) J Bates (Sweden) T Svantesson	3	2
(Australia) B Dyke (Netherlands) T Nijssen	1	4
(Australia) D Cahill (Australia) M Kratzmann	6	6
(United States) S DeVries (United States) R Matuszewski	6	6	7
(West Germany) E Jelen (West Germany) P Kühnen	2	7	9
(United Kingdom) N Broad (South Africa) E Edwards	7	4	6
3	(United States) K Curren (United States) D Pate	5	6	1
8	(Canada) G Connell (Canada) G Michibata	6	4
(Australia) B Drewett (Australia) W Masur	7	6
(United States) J Grabb (Italy) D Nargiso	7	6
(Brazil) R Acioly (Venezuela) N Pereira	5	4
(United States) M Anger (United States) R Van't Hof	6	7
(United States) B Man-Son-Hing (West Germany) A Mronz	4	6
(India) Z Ali (Italy) U Colombini	2	2
2	(Australia) J Fitzgerald (Australia) M Woodforde	6	6

Second round
6	(Sweden) S Edberg (United States) R Leach	5	6
(Australia) D Cahill (Australia) M Kratzmann	7	7
(West Germany) E Jelen (West Germany) P Kühnen	4	1
(United Kingdom) N Broad (South Africa) E Edwards	6	6
(Australia) B Drewett (Australia) W Masur	6	6	3
(United States) J Grabb (Italy) D Nargiso	7	4	6
(United States) M Anger (United States) R Van't Hof	7	4	12
2	(Australia) J Fitzgerald (Australia) M Woodforde	5	6	10

Quarterfinals
(Australia) D Cahill (Australia) M Kratzmann	6	6
(United Kingdom) N Broad (South Africa) E Edwards	3	4
(United States) J Grabb (Italy) D Nargiso	4	6
(United States) M Anger (United States) R Van't Hof	6	7

Semifinals
(Australia) D Cahill (Australia) M Kratzmann	2	6	6
(United States) M Anger (United States) R Van't Hof	6	3	1
