= 1990 Stella Artois Championships – Doubles =

Doubles
- 1990 Stella Artois Championships

Final
- Champions: (United Kingdom) Jeremy Bates (United States) Kevin Curren
- Runners-up: (France) Henri Leconte (Czechoslovakia) Ivan Lendl
- Score: 6–2, 7–6

Details
- Draw: 28
- Seeds: 8

Events
Singles	Doubles
← 1989 ·	Queen's Club Championships	· 1991 →

Darren Cahill and Mark Kratzmann were the defending champions and lost in the second round to Stefan Edberg and Pete Sampras.

Jeremy Bates and Kevin Curren won in the final 6–2, 7–6 against Henri Leconte and Ivan Lendl.

== Seeds ==
The top four seeded teams received byes into the second round.

1. (South Africa) Pieter Aldrich / (South Africa) Danie Visser (semifinals)
2. (Australia) John Fitzgerald / (Sweden) Anders Järryd (quarterfinals)
3. (United States) Scott Davis / (United States) David Pate (quarterfinals)
4. (Australia) Darren Cahill / (Australia) Mark Kratzmann (second round)
5. (Canada) Grant Connell / (Canada) Glenn Michibata (second round)
6. (United Kingdom) Neil Broad / (South Africa) Gary Muller (first round)
7. (France) Guy Forget / (France) Éric Winogradsky (quarterfinals)
8. (United States) Rick Leach / (Italy) Diego Nargiso (second round)

== Draw ==
=== Key ===
- Q = Qualifier
- WC = Wild card
- LL = Lucky loser
- Alt = Alternate
- SE = Special exempt
- PR = Protected ranking
- ITF = ITF entry
- JE = Junior exempt
- w/o = Walkover
- r = Retired
- d = Defaulted
- SR = Special ranking

=== Finals ===
Semifinals
1	(South Africa) Pieter Aldrich (South Africa) Danie Visser	3	7^{7}	3
(United Kingdom) Jeremy Bates (United States) Kevin Curren	6	6^{5}	6
(France) Henri Leconte (Czechoslovakia) Ivan Lendl	7	3	6
(United States) Ken Flach (United States) Robert Seguso	5	6	4

Final
(United Kingdom) Jeremy Bates (United States) Kevin Curren	6	7
(France) Henri Leconte (Czechoslovakia) Ivan Lendl	2	6

=== Top half ===
First round
(Australia) P Cash (Australia) W Masur	6	6
(United States) T Pawsat (Australia) T Woodbridge	3	2
(United States) K Kinnear (United States) B Pearce	1	2
(West Germany) B Becker (West Germany) P Kühnen	6	6
Q	(United Kingdom) N Brown (United Kingdom) N Fulwood	6	3	7
7	(France) G Forget (France) É Winogradsky	2	6	9
(Austria) A Antonitsch (United Kingdom) A Castle	6^{4}	4
(United States) K Jones (United States) R Van't Hof	7^{7}	6
(Australia) P Doohan (Australia) L Warder	2	2
(United Kingdom) J Bates (United States) K Curren	6	6
(Argentina) J Frana (Mexico) L Lavalle	6^{2}	6	3
5	(Canada) G Connell (Canada) G Michibata	7^{7}	3	6

Second round
1	(South Africa) P Aldrich (South Africa) D Visser	6	7^{7}
(Australia) P Cash (Australia) W Masur	3	6^{4}
(West Germany) B Becker (West Germany) P Kühnen	6^{6}	3
7	(France) G Forget (France) É Winogradsky	7^{8}	6
3	(United States) S Davis (United States) D Pate	6	7
(United States) K Jones (United States) R Van't Hof	4	5
(United Kingdom) J Bates (United States) K Curren	7^{7}	7^{7}
5	(Canada) G Connell (Canada) G Michibata	6^{5}	6^{4}

Quarterfinals
1	(South Africa) P Aldrich (South Africa) D Visser	7^{7}	6
7	(France) G Forget (France) É Winogradsky	6^{4}	4
3	(United States) S Davis (United States) D Pate	6	3	1
(United Kingdom) J Bates (United States) K Curren	4	6	6

Semifinals
1	(South Africa) P Aldrich (South Africa) D Visser	3	7^{7}	3
(United Kingdom) J Bates (United States) K Curren	6	6^{5}	6

=== Bottom half ===
First round
6	(United Kingdom) N Broad (South Africa) G Muller	7	6^{9}	15
(United States) P Galbraith (Australia) D Macpherson	5	7^{11}	17
(West Germany) E Jelen (Socialist Federal Republic of Yugoslavia) S Živojinović	2	5
(France) H Leconte (Czechoslovakia) I Lendl	6	7
(Sweden) S Edberg (United States) P Sampras	7^{9}	4	6
(Australia) B Dyke (Australia) S Youl	6^{7}	6	4
8	(United States) R Leach (Italy) D Nargiso	7	6
(United States) C Beckman (United States) L Jensen	5	3
(United States) K Flach (United States) R Seguso	7^{7}	6
(United States) P Chamberlin (United States) T Wilkison	6^{2}	4
Q	(United Kingdom) M Petchey (United Kingdom) D Sapsford	6^{6}	6	7
(United States) P Annacone (South Africa) C van Rensburg	7^{8}	3	9

Second round
(United States) P Galbraith (Australia) D Macpherson	6	6^{6}	4
(France) H Leconte (Czechoslovakia) I Lendl	3	7^{8}	6
(Sweden) S Edberg (United States) P Sampras	6^{3}	6	11
4	(Australia) D Cahill (Australia) M Kratzmann	7^{7}	4	9
8	(United States) R Leach (Italy) D Nargiso	7	4	4
(United States) K Flach (United States) R Seguso	5	6	6
(United States) P Annacone (South Africa) C van Rensburg	4	3
2	(Australia) J Fitzgerald (Sweden) A Järryd	6	6

Quarterfinals
(France) H Leconte (Czechoslovakia) I Lendl	7^{7}	6
(Sweden) S Edberg (United States) P Sampras	6^{4}	4
(United States) K Flach (United States) R Seguso	7^{7}	6
2	(Australia) J Fitzgerald (Sweden) A Järryd	6^{3}	2

Semifinals
(France) H Leconte (Czechoslovakia) I Lendl	7	3	6
(United States) K Flach (United States) R Seguso	5	6	4
