= 1989 Stella Artois Championships =

- Date: 12–19 June
- Edition: 87th
- Category: Grand Prix
- Draw: 64S / 32D
- Prize money: $350,000
- Surface: Grass / outdoor
- Location: London, United Kingdom
- Venue: Queen's Club

Champions

Singles
- (Czechoslovakia) Ivan Lendl

Doubles
- (Australia) Darren Cahill / (Australia) Mark Kratzmann
← 1988 ·	Queen's Club Championships	· 1990 →

The 1989 Stella Artois Championships was a men's tennis tournament played on grass courts at the Queen's Club in London, United Kingdom that was part of the 1989 Nabisco Grand Prix circuit. It was the 87th edition of the tournament and ran from 12 June until 19 June 1989. First-seeded Ivan Lendl won the singles title.

== Finals ==
=== Singles ===
(Czechoslovakia) Ivan Lendl defeated (South Africa) Christo van Rensburg 4–6, 6–3, 6–4

- It was Lendl's 6th title of the year and the 85th of his career.

=== Doubles ===
(Australia) Darren Cahill / (Australia) Mark Kratzmann defeated (United States) Tim Pawsat / (Australia) Laurie Warder 7–6, 6–3

- It was Cahill's 1st title of the year and the 8th of his career. It was Kratzmann's 1st title of the year and the 6th of his career.
