= 1986 Stella Artois Championships – Singles =

Singles
- 1986 Stella Artois Championships

Final
- Champion: (United States) Tim Mayotte
- Runner-up: (United States) Jimmy Connors
- Score: 6–4, 2–1 (Connors retired)

Details
- Draw: 64
- Seeds: 16

Events
Singles	Doubles
← 1985 ·	Queen's Club Championships	· 1987 →

Boris Becker was the defending champion but lost in the quarterfinals to Tim Mayotte.

Mayotte won in the final 6–4, 2–1 after Jimmy Connors was forced to retire.

== Seeds ==
1. (United States) Jimmy Connors (final)
2. (West Germany) Boris Becker (quarterfinals)
3. (Sweden) Stefan Edberg (semifinals)
4. (Sweden) Anders Järryd (first round)
5. (United States) Kevin Curren (second round)
6. (United States) Brad Gilbert (second round)
7. (United States) Paul Annacone (quarterfinals)
8. (United States) Tim Mayotte (champion)
9. (United States) ~~Johan Kriek~~ (withdrew)
10. (United States) David Pate (third round)
11. (United States) Matt Anger (first round)
12. (United States) Tim Wilkison (quarterfinals)
13. (Socialist Federal Republic of Yugoslavia) Slobodan Živojinović (second round)
14. (Australia) Paul McNamee (third round)
15. (West Germany) Andreas Maurer (first round)
16. (France) Guy Forget (third round)

== Draw ==
=== Key ===
- Q = Qualifier
- WC = Wild card
- LL = Lucky loser
- Alt = Alternate
- SE = Special exempt
- PR = Protected ranking
- ITF = ITF entry
- JE = Junior exempt
- w/o = Walkover
- r = Retired
- d = Defaulted
- SR = Special ranking

=== Finals ===
Semifinals
1	(United States) Jimmy Connors	6	6
(United States) Robert Seguso	3	4
3	(Sweden) Stefan Edberg	6	1
8	(United States) Tim Mayotte	7	6

Final
1	(United States) Jimmy Connors	4	1^{r}
8	(United States) Tim Mayotte	6	2

=== Top half ===
==== Section 1 ====
First round
1	(United States) J Connors	6	6
(Netherlands) M Schapers	1	2
(Nigeria) N Odizor	5	7	5
Q	(United States) P Fleming	7	6	7
(United States) T Gullikson	4	6	6
(United States) S Davis	6	1	2
(United States) G Holmes	1	r
16	(France) G Forget	6
LL	(New Zealand) R Simpson	6	6
(United States) B Teacher	4	4
WC	(United Kingdom) S Bale	3	6	3
WC	(United Kingdom) A Castle	6	3	6
(Mexico) L Lavalle	2	6	2
Q	(South Africa) C van Rensburg	6	3	6
(Australia) W Masur	6	4	4
7	(United States) P Annacone	3	6	6

Second round
1	(United States) J Connors	6	6
Q	(United States) P Fleming	3	2
(United States) T Gullikson	5	6
16	(France) G Forget	7	7
LL	(New Zealand) R Simpson	6	2
WC	(United Kingdom) A Castle	7	6
Q	(South Africa) C van Rensburg	3	7	3
7	(United States) P Annacone	6	6	6

Third round
1	(United States) J Connors	6	6
16	(France) G Forget	3	1
WC	(United Kingdom) A Castle	4	1
7	(United States) P Annacone	6	6

Quarterfinals
1	(United States) J Connors	6	6
7	(United States) P Annacone	3	4

==== Section 2 ====
First round
4	(Sweden) A Järryd	6	6	1
(United States) G Layendecker	7	3	6
Q	(South Africa) D Visser	6	7
(Canada) M Wostenholme	2	5
(United States) J Canter	6	6
(United States) R Seguso	7	7
Q	(South Africa) B Moir	3	6	4
13	(Socialist Federal Republic of Yugoslavia) S Živojinović	6	4	6
11	(United States) M Anger	2	5
Q	(United States) M Freeman	6	7
(United States) M De Palmer	6	4	19
(United Kingdom) J Lloyd	1	6	17
(United States) B Schultz	6	3	3
(India) R Krishnan	4	6	6
(United States) M Leach	4	2
6	(United States) B Gilbert	6	6

Second round
(United States) G Layendecker	6	3
Q	(South Africa) D Visser	7	6
(United States) R Seguso	6	6
13	(Socialist Federal Republic of Yugoslavia) S Živojinović	4	3
Q	(United States) M Freeman	6	6
(United States) M De Palmer	2	1
(India) R Krishnan	7	6
6	(United States) B Gilbert	5	1

Third round
Q	(South Africa) D Visser	4	2
(United States) R Seguso	6	6
Q	(United States) M Freeman	1	2
(India) R Krishnan	6	6

Quarterfinals
(United States) R Seguso	6	7
(India) R Krishnan	4	6

=== Bottom half ===
==== Section 3 ====
First round
5	(United States) K Curren	6	6
(Brazil) C Motta	4	1
(India) V Amritraj	2	6	3
(United States) T Nelson	6	4	6
(New Zealand) K Evernden	4	4
(United States) B Green	6	6
WC	(United Kingdom) S Shaw	3	2
12	(United States) T Wilkison	6	6
14	(Australia) P McNamee	6	6
(Australia) J Fitzgerald	3	4
(United Kingdom) J Bates	6	6
(Canada) G Michibata	4	1
(United States) M Davis	4	6
(South Africa) C Steyn	6	7
(Chile) R Acuña	4	1
3	(Sweden) S Edberg	6	6

Second round
5	(United States) K Curren	6	6	3
(United States) T Nelson	7	4	6
(United States) B Green	6	0
12	(United States) T Wilkison	7	6
14	(Australia) P McNamee	6	4	6
(United Kingdom) J Bates	3	6	1
(South Africa) C Steyn	5	4
3	(Sweden) S Edberg	7	6

Third round
(United States) T Nelson	7	6	11
12	(United States) T Wilkison	6	7	13
14	(Australia) P McNamee	5	3
3	(Sweden) S Edberg	7	6

Quarterfinals
12	(United States) T Wilkison	3	3
3	(Sweden) S Edberg	6	6

==== Section 4 ====
First round
8	(United States) T Mayotte	6	6
WC	(United States) B Scanlon	3	3
Q	(United States) G Donnelly	6	7	4
(Australia) M Woodforde	7	6	6
(Australia) B Dyke	6	4	6
(United States) J Sadri	3	6	2
(United States) S Giammalva Jr.	6	6	2
10	(United States) D Pate	4	7	6
15	(West Germany) A Maurer	7	6	5
Q	(South Africa) E Edwards	5	7	7
(Australia) S Youl	6	6
(West Germany) E Jelen	2	3
Q	(United States) T Warneke	4	3
WC	(Soviet Union) A Chesnokov	6	6
(United States) K Flach	2	2
2	(West Germany) B Becker	6	6

Second round
8	(United States) T Mayotte	6	4	6
(Australia) M Woodforde	2	6	2
(Australia) B Dyke	3	2
10	(United States) D Pate	6	6
Q	(South Africa) E Edwards	3	7	2
(Australia) S Youl	6	6	6
WC	(Soviet Union) A Chesnokov	4	2
2	(West Germany) B Becker	6	6

Third round
8	(United States) T Mayotte	7	6
10	(United States) D Pate	6	1
(Australia) S Youl	3	1
2	(West Germany) B Becker	6	6

Quarterfinals
8	(United States) T Mayotte	6	7	6
2	(West Germany) B Becker	7	6	2
