= 1987 Stella Artois Championships – Singles =

Singles
- 1987 Stella Artois Championships

Final
- Champion: (West Germany) Boris Becker
- Runner-up: (United States) Jimmy Connors
- Score: 6–7, 6–3, 6–4

Details
- Draw: 64
- Seeds: 16

Events
Singles	Doubles
← 1986 ·	Queen's Club Championships	· 1988 →

Tim Mayotte was the defending champion but lost in the semifinals to no.1 seeded Boris Becker.

Becker won the singles title at the 1987 Stella Artois Championships tennis tournament by defeating Jimmy Connors in the final 6–7, 6–3, 6–4.

== Seeds ==
1. (West Germany) Boris Becker (champion)
2. (Sweden) Stefan Edberg (quarterfinals)
3. (Sweden) Mats Wilander (first round)
4. (France) Yannick Noah (first round)
5. (United States) Jimmy Connors (final)
6. (United States) Tim Mayotte (semifinals)
7. (Australia) Pat Cash (semifinals)
8. (United States) David Pate (quarterfinals)
9. (United States) Kevin Curren (third round)
10. (United States) Scott Davis (first round)
11. (United States) Robert Seguso (first round)
12. (Socialist Federal Republic of Yugoslavia) Slobodan Živojinović (first round)
13. (India) Ramesh Krishnan (quarterfinals)
14. (Israel) Amos Mansdorf (third round)
15. (Australia) Wally Masur (third round)
16. (United States) Tim Wilkison (first round)

== Draw ==
=== Key ===
- Q = Qualifier
- WC = Wild card
- LL = Lucky loser
- Alt = Alternate
- SE = Special exempt
- PR = Protected ranking
- ITF = ITF entry
- JE = Junior exempt
- w/o = Walkover
- r = Retired
- d = Defaulted
- SR = Special ranking

=== Finals ===
Semifinals
1	(West Germany) Boris Becker	4	7	6
6	(United States) Tim Mayotte	6	6	4
5	(United States) Jimmy Connors	7	6
7	(Australia) Pat Cash	6	4

Final
1	(West Germany) Boris Becker	6	6	6
5	(United States) Jimmy Connors	7	3	4

=== Top half ===
==== Section 1 ====
First round
1	(West Germany) B Becker	6	6
(Australia) P Doohan	2	4
WC	(United States) P Fleming	6	6
(United States) D Rostagno	1	2
LL	(United States) J Sadri	6	6
(South Africa) C Steyn	4	4
LL	(Australia) S Youl	6	6
16	(United States) T Wilkison	3	4
10	(United States) S Davis	6	7	2
Q	(United States) L Bourne	7	5	6
Q	(United States) L Scott	6	6
(United States) B Scanlon	7	7
WC	(United Kingdom) J Bates	6	6
WC	(United Kingdom) A Castle	3	1
(United States) M Freeman	6	6	4
8	(United States) D Pate	4	7	6

Second round
1	(West Germany) B Becker	6	6
WC	(United States) P Fleming	4	2
LL	(United States) J Sadri	3	7	6
LL	(Australia) S Youl	6	6	2
Q	(United States) L Bourne	6	2
(United States) B Scanlon	7	6
WC	(United Kingdom) J Bates	6	5
8	(United States) D Pate	7	7

Third round
1	(West Germany) B Becker	6	6
LL	(United States) J Sadri	4	4
(United States) B Scanlon	6	6
8	(United States) D Pate	7	7

Quarterfinals
1	(West Germany) B Becker	6	7
8	(United States) D Pate	4	6

==== Section 2 ====
First round
4	(France) Y Noah	6	6	3
(West Germany) A Maurer	3	7	6
Q	(United States) G Layendecker	6	3	5
(United States) D Goldie	1	6	7
(United States) M Leach	3	2
Q	(United States) J Rive	6	6
(South Africa) E Edwards	6	5	6
13	(India) R Krishnan	1	7	8
11	(United States) R Seguso	6	6	2
(Peru) J Yzaga	7	3	6
Q	(United States) R Reneberg	7	6
Q	(Argentina) J Frana	5	1
(Australia) P McNamee	6	6	6
(United States) C Hooper	4	7	2
(United States) T Nelson	2	4
6	(United States) T Mayotte	6	6

Second round
(West Germany) A Maurer	6	6
(United States) D Goldie	4	3
Q	(United States) J Rive	7	6	3
13	(India) R Krishnan	6	7	6
(Peru) J Yzaga	3	4
Q	(United States) R Reneberg	6	6
(Australia) P McNamee	2	5
6	(United States) T Mayotte	6	7

Third round
(West Germany) A Maurer	1	6
13	(India) R Krishnan	6	7
Q	(United States) R Reneberg	4	6
6	(United States) T Mayotte	6	7

Quarterfinals
13	(India) R Krishnan	2	3
6	(United States) T Mayotte	6	6

=== Bottom half ===
==== Section 3 ====
First round
5	(United States) J Connors	6	6
(South Africa) D Visser	3	4
WC	(United Kingdom) S Shaw	6	7
(United States) M Kures	3	6
(Canada) M Laurendeau	6	5
(France) G Forget	7	7
(Nigeria) N Odizor	6	7
12	(Socialist Federal Republic of Yugoslavia) S Živojinović	4	6
14	(Israel) A Mansdorf	6	6
(United States) M Anger	1	2
Q	(Australia) M Woodforde	6	3	8
(United States) K Jones	2	6	6
(India) V Amritraj	2	2
(West Germany) P Kühnen	6	6
(West Germany) E Jelen	6	6	6
3	(Sweden) M Wilander	3	7	4

Second round
5	(United States) J Connors	6	6	7
WC	(United Kingdom) S Shaw	4	7	5
(France) G Forget	6	6	20
(Nigeria) N Odizor	7	4	22
14	(Israel) A Mansdorf	6	6
Q	(Australia) M Woodforde	3	4
(West Germany) P Kühnen	5	4
(West Germany) E Jelen	7	6

Third round
5	(United States) J Connors	7	7
(Nigeria) N Odizor	5	5
14	(Israel) A Mansdorf	4	6	3
(West Germany) E Jelen	6	3	6

Quarterfinals
5	(United States) J Connors	6	6
(West Germany) E Jelen	4	4

==== Section 4 ====
First round
7	(Australia) P Cash	6	6
(United States) R Matuszewski	4	4
(United States) B Testerman	6	3
(Australia) J Fitzgerald	7	6
(Israel) G Bloom	3	2
(Australia) M Kratzmann	6	6
Q	(France) E Winogradsky	6	4
9	(United States) K Curren	7	6
15	(Australia) W Masur	6	6
(Australia) B Dyke	3	2
(United States) M Purcell	6	7
(Australia) D Cahill	4	6
(United States) G Donnelly	2	2
(New Zealand) K Evernden	6	6
(United States) S Giammalva Jr.	4	3
2	(Sweden) S Edberg	6	6

Second round
7	(Australia) P Cash	6	3	6
(Australia) J Fitzgerald	4	6	3
(Australia) M Kratzmann	6	1
9	(United States) K Curren	7	6
15	(Australia) W Masur	6	6
(United States) M Purcell	3	4
(New Zealand) K Evernden	6	4
2	(Sweden) S Edberg	7	6

Third round
7	(Australia) P Cash	7	6
9	(United States) K Curren	5	3
15	(Australia) W Masur	7	6	4
2	(Sweden) S Edberg	6	7	6

Quarterfinals
7	(Australia) P Cash	7	7
2	(Sweden) S Edberg	6	6
