= 1991 Stella Artois Championships – Doubles =

Doubles
- 1991 Stella Artois Championships

Final
- Champions: (Australia) Todd Woodbridge (Australia) Mark Woodforde
- Runners-up: (Canada) Grant Connell (Canada) Glenn Michibata
- Score: 6–4, 7–6

Details
- Draw: 28
- Seeds: 8

Events
Singles	Doubles
← 1990 ·	Queen's Club Championships	· 1992 →

Jeremy Bates and Kevin Curren were the defending champions but they competed with different partners that year, Bates with Nick Brown and Curren with Neil Broad.

Broad and Curren lost in the second round to Bates and Brown.

Bates and Brown lost in the quarterfinals to Piet Norval and Brad Pearce.

Todd Woodbridge and Mark Woodforde won in the final 6–4, 7–6 against Grant Connell and Glenn Michibata.

== Seeds ==
The top four seeded teams received byes into the second round.

1. (United States) Scott Davis / (United States) David Pate (quarterfinals)
2. (United States) Patrick Galbraith / (United States) Todd Witsken (second round)
3. (Canada) Grant Connell / (Canada) Glenn Michibata (final)
4. (South Africa) Gary Muller / (South Africa) Danie Visser (second round)
5. (Australia) Todd Woodbridge / (Australia) Mark Woodforde (champions)
6. (Australia) John Fitzgerald / (Sweden) Anders Järryd (second round)
7. (United States) Kelly Jones / (Mexico) Jorge Lozano (first round)
8. (United Kingdom) Neil Broad / (United States) Kevin Curren (second round)

== Draw ==
=== Key ===
- Q = Qualifier
- WC = Wild card
- LL = Lucky loser
- Alt = Alternate
- SE = Special exempt
- PR = Protected ranking
- ITF = ITF entry
- JE = Junior exempt
- w/o = Walkover
- r = Retired
- d = Defaulted
- SR = Special ranking

=== Finals ===
Semifinals
WC	(Sweden) Stefan Edberg (United States) Pete Sampras	6	4
5	(Australia) Todd Woodbridge (Australia) Mark Woodforde	7	6
3	(Canada) Grant Connell (Canada) Glenn Michibata	6	6
(South Africa) Piet Norval (United States) Brad Pearce	3	3

Final
5	(Australia) Todd Woodbridge (Australia) Mark Woodforde	6	7
3	(Canada) Grant Connell (Canada) Glenn Michibata	4	6

=== Top half ===
First round
(Australia) B Dyke (Sweden) P Lundgren	6	7
(United States) J Grabb (Czechoslovakia) I Lendl	3	6
(Germany) E Jelen (Australia) M Kratzmann	7	6
(United States) L Jensen (Australia) L Warder	5	3
WC	(Sweden) S Edberg (United States) P Sampras	7	3	7
7	(United States) K Jones (Mexico) J Lozano	6	6	5
(South Africa) S Kruger (South Africa) C van Rensburg	6	7
WC	(United Kingdom) M Maclagan (United Kingdom) M Schofield	4	6
Q	(United States) M Keil (Kenya) P Wekesa	6	4	3
(Australia) P Cash (United States) R Seguso	4	6	6
(Brazil) L Mattar (Brazil) J Oncins	5	3
5	(Australia) T Woodbridge (Australia) M Woodforde	7	6

Second round
1	(United States) S Davis (United States) D Pate	6	6	6
(Australia) B Dyke (Sweden) P Lundgren	3	7	4
(Germany) E Jelen (Australia) M Kratzmann	2	2
WC	(Sweden) S Edberg (United States) P Sampras	6	6
4	(South Africa) G Muller (South Africa) D Visser	4	5
(South Africa) S Kruger (South Africa) C van Rensburg	6	7
(Australia) P Cash (United States) R Seguso	0	4
5	(Australia) T Woodbridge (Australia) M Woodforde	6	6

Quarterfinals
1	(United States) S Davis (United States) D Pate	7	4	4
WC	(Sweden) S Edberg (United States) P Sampras	5	6	6
(South Africa) S Kruger (South Africa) C van Rensburg	5	3
5	(Australia) T Woodbridge (Australia) M Woodforde	7	6

Semifinals
WC	(Sweden) S Edberg (United States) P Sampras	6	4
5	(Australia) T Woodbridge (Australia) M Woodforde	7	6

=== Bottom half ===
First round
6	(Australia) J Fitzgerald (Sweden) A Järryd	7	7
(United States) S DeVries (Australia) D Macpherson	6	5
Q	(Italy) G Pozzi (United States) D Rostagno	3	6	11
LL	(United States) B Steel (United States) J Tarango	6	3	9
(United States) P Annacone (United States) D Wheaton	6	3	7
(United States) C Beckman (United States) S Melville	4	6	5
8	(United Kingdom) N Broad (United States) K Curren	3	7	8
(United Kingdom) A Castle (Socialist Federal Republic of Yugoslavia) S Živojinović	6	6	6
(United Kingdom) J Bates (United Kingdom) N Brown	6	3	13
(Argentina) J Frana (Venezuela) N Pereira	3	6	11
(South Africa) P Norval (United States) B Pearce	6	5	6
(Australia) W Masur (Australia) J Stoltenberg	3	7	4

Second round
6	(Australia) J Fitzgerald (Sweden) A Järryd	6	6
Q	(Italy) G Pozzi (United States) D Rostagno	3	3
(United States) P Annacone (United States) D Wheaton	5	6	4
3	(Canada) G Connell (Canada) G Michibata	7	3	6
8	(United Kingdom) N Broad (United States) K Curren	4	6
(United Kingdom) J Bates (United Kingdom) N Brown	6	7
(South Africa) P Norval (United States) B Pearce	6	0	6
2	(United States) P Galbraith (United States) T Witsken	4	6	1

Quarterfinals
Q	(Italy) G Pozzi (United States) D Rostagno	6	4
3	(Canada) G Connell (Canada) G Michibata	7	6
(United Kingdom) J Bates (United Kingdom) N Brown	1	0
(South Africa) P Norval (United States) B Pearce	6	6

Semifinals
3	(Canada) G Connell (Canada) G Michibata	6	6
(South Africa) P Norval (United States) B Pearce	3	3
