= 1988 Stella Artois Championships – Singles =

Singles
- 1988 Stella Artois Championships

Final
- Champion: (West Germany) Boris Becker
- Runner-up: (Sweden) Stefan Edberg
- Score: 6–1, 3–6, 6–3

Details
- Draw: 64
- Seeds: 16

Events
Singles	Doubles
← 1987 ·	Queen's Club Championships	· 1989 →

Boris Becker was the defending champion and won in the final 6–1, 3–6, 6–3 against Stefan Edberg.

== Seeds ==
1. (Sweden) Stefan Edberg (final)
2. (Australia) Pat Cash (third round)
3. (United States) Jimmy Connors (third round)
4. (West Germany) Boris Becker (champion)
5. (Israel) Amos Mansdorf (third round)
6. (Socialist Federal Republic of Yugoslavia) Slobodan Živojinović (first round)
7. (United States) David Pate (third round)
8. (Australia) John Fitzgerald (second round)
9. (United States) Kevin Curren (quarterfinals)
10. (South Africa) Christo van Rensburg (quarterfinals)
11. (India) Ramesh Krishnan (third round)
12. (West Germany) Eric Jelen (quarterfinals)
13. (France) Guy Forget (semifinals)
14. (New Zealand) Kelly Evernden (first round)
15. (United States) Johan Kriek (third round)
16. (Australia) Mark Woodforde (first round)

== Draw ==
=== Key ===
- Q = Qualifier
- WC = Wild card
- LL = Lucky loser
- Alt = Alternate
- SE = Special exempt
- PR = Protected ranking
- ITF = ITF entry
- JE = Junior exempt
- w/o = Walkover
- r = Retired
- d = Defaulted
- SR = Special ranking

=== Finals ===
Semifinals
1	(Sweden) Stefan Edberg	7	6
13	(France) Guy Forget	6	1
4	(West Germany) Boris Becker	6	6
(Australia) Darren Cahill	2	4

Final
1	(Sweden) Stefan Edberg	1	6	3
4	(West Germany) Boris Becker	6	3	6

=== Top half ===
==== Section 1 ====
First round
1	(Sweden) S Edberg	6	5	6
Q	(Australia) S Barr	4	7	4
(United Kingdom) S Shaw	6	2	4
(The Bahamas) R Smith	3	6	6
Q	(Iran) M Bahrami	6	0	0^{r}
LL	(West Germany) P Baur	2	6	3
(United States) M Davis	7	2	3
15	(United States) J Kriek	5	6	6
10	(South Africa) C van Rensburg	7	7
(United States) T Nelson	6	5
(Canada) C Pridham	6	6
(Australia) P Doohan	2	3
(United States) S Giammalva Jr.	3	6	2
(Australia) J Stoltenberg	6	4	6
(United States) T Wilkison	3	2
8	(Australia) J Fitzgerald	6	6

Second round
1	(Sweden) S Edberg	6	6
(The Bahamas) R Smith	2	1
LL	(West Germany) P Baur	7	5	6
15	(United States) J Kriek	6	7	8
10	(South Africa) C van Rensburg	6	6
(Canada) C Pridham	2	0
(Australia) J Stoltenberg	7	7
8	(Australia) J Fitzgerald	6	5

Third round
1	(Sweden) S Edberg	4	6	6
15	(United States) J Kriek	6	1	2
10	(South Africa) C van Rensburg	6	6
(Australia) J Stoltenberg	1	2

Quarterfinals
1	(Sweden) S Edberg	7	5	6
10	(South Africa) C van Rensburg	5	7	4

==== Section 2 ====
First round
3	(United States) J Connors	6	6
(United States) M Purcell	3	4
(United States) M Anger	4	5
(United States) R Seguso	6	7
(West Germany) P Kühnen	2	6	3
Q	(South Africa) D Visser	6	3	6
(Australia) J Anderson	3	4
13	(France) G Forget	6	6
11	(India) R Krishnan	6	6	6
(West Germany) A Maurer	7	3	0
(United States) M Flur	2	5
(Australia) W Masur	6	7
WC	(United Kingdom) N Fulwood	4	1
(Australia) B Dyke	6	6
WC	(United Kingdom) J Turner	6	6
6	(Socialist Federal Republic of Yugoslavia) S Živojinović	2	3

Second round
3	(United States) J Connors	6	6	10
(United States) R Seguso	3	7	8
Q	(South Africa) D Visser	2	3
13	(France) G Forget	6	6
11	(India) R Krishnan	5	6	7
(Australia) W Masur	7	1	5
(Australia) B Dyke	6	6
WC	(United Kingdom) J Turner	2	4

Third round
3	(United States) J Connors	4	6
13	(France) G Forget	6	7
11	(India) R Krishnan	3	6	2
(Australia) B Dyke	6	3	6

Quarterfinals
13	(France) G Forget	7	6
(Australia) B Dyke	6	4

=== Bottom half ===
==== Section 3 ====
First round
5	(Israel) A Mansdorf	7	4	6
WC	(United Kingdom) S Botfield	6	6	3
Q	(Canada) G Michibata	7	6
(Australia) S Youl	5	1
(West Germany) C Saceanu	6	6
(France) E Winogradsky	4	4
(United States) M Chang	6	2	1
12	(West Germany) E Jelen	1	6	6
14	(New Zealand) K Evernden	5	6
Q	(United States) B Scanlon	7	7
(South Africa) G Muller	7	6
(United States) L Shiras	6	3
(United States) J Grabb	4	7	2
(United States) S Davis	6	5	6
Q	(Australia) C Eagle	1	3
4	(West Germany) B Becker	6	6

Second round
5	(Israel) A Mansdorf	6	1	6
Q	(Canada) G Michibata	2	6	4
(West Germany) C Saceanu	4	2
12	(West Germany) E Jelen	6	6
Q	(United States) B Scanlon	4	6	6
(South Africa) G Muller	6	3	4
(United States) S Davis	6	3	4
4	(West Germany) B Becker	4	6	6

Third round
5	(Israel) A Mansdorf	2	2
12	(West Germany) E Jelen	6	6
Q	(United States) B Scanlon	3	4
4	(West Germany) B Becker	6	6

Quarterfinals
12	(West Germany) E Jelen	5	2
4	(West Germany) B Becker	7	6

==== Section 4 ====
First round
7	(United States) D Pate	6	7
(United States) G Holmes	4	6
(France) J Potier	2	3
WC	(United Kingdom) D Felgate	6	6
Q	(United States) S DeVries	6	6
(United States) D Cassidy	1	4
Q	(Canada) G Connell	6	3	5
WC/9	(United States) K Curren	4	6	7
16	(Australia) M Woodforde	6	5	0
(United States) K Flach	2	7	6
Q	(Chile) R Acuña	7	3	7
(Australia) D Cahill	6	6	9
(Argentina) J Frana	7	6
(United States) R Reneberg	6	3
(South Africa) P Aldrich	0	1
2	(Australia) P Cash	6	6

Second round
7	(United States) D Pate	6	7
WC	(United Kingdom) D Felgate	4	6
Q	(United States) S DeVries	6	3
WC/9	(United States) K Curren	7	6
(United States) K Flach	6	5	3
(Australia) D Cahill	2	7	6
(Argentina) J Frana	1	1
2	(Australia) P Cash	6	6

Third round
7	(United States) D Pate	6	3
WC/9	(United States) K Curren	7	6
(Australia) D Cahill	7	6
2	(Australia) P Cash	6	4

Quarterfinals
WC/9	(United States) K Curren	5	6
(Australia) D Cahill	7	7
