= 1993 Stella Artois Championships – Doubles =

Doubles
- 1993 Stella Artois Championships

Final
- Champions: (Australia) Todd Woodbridge (Australia) Mark Woodforde
- Runners-up: (United Kingdom) Neil Broad (South Africa) Gary Muller
- Score: 6–7, 6–3, 6–4

Details
- Draw: 28

Events
Singles	Doubles
← 1992 ·	Queen's Club Championships	· 1994 →

John Fitzgerald and Anders Järryd were the defending champions but lost in the semifinals to Neil Broad and Gary Muller.

Todd Woodbridge and Mark Woodforde won in the final 6–7, 6–3, 6–4 against Broad and Muller.

== Seeds ==
The top four seeded teams received byes into the second round.

1. (Australia) Todd Woodbridge / (Australia) Mark Woodforde (champions)
2. (Australia) John Fitzgerald / (Sweden) Anders Järryd (semifinals)
3. (South Africa) Danie Visser / (Australia) Laurie Warder (second round)
4. (Canada) Grant Connell / (United States) Patrick Galbraith (second round)
5. (United States) Steve DeVries / (Australia) David Macpherson (first round)
6. (United States) Ken Flach / (United States) Rick Leach (first round)
7. (United States) Richey Reneberg / (United States) David Wheaton (second round)
8. (South Africa) Wayne Ferreira / (Germany) Michael Stich (quarterfinals)

== Draw ==
=== Key ===
- Q = Qualifier
- WC = Wild card
- LL = Lucky loser
- Alt = Alternate
- SE = Special exempt
- PR = Protected ranking
- ITF = ITF entry
- JE = Junior exempt
- w/o = Walkover
- r = Retired
- d = Defaulted
- SR = Special ranking

=== Finals ===
Semifinals
1	(Australia) Todd Woodbridge (Australia) Mark Woodforde	7	6
(Germany) Boris Becker (Germany) Patrik Kühnen	6	3
(United Kingdom) Neil Broad (South Africa) Gary Muller	6	6	6
2	(Australia) John Fitzgerald (Sweden) Anders Järryd	7	4	2

Final
1	(Australia) Todd Woodbridge (Australia) Mark Woodforde	6	6	6
(United Kingdom) Neil Broad (South Africa) Gary Muller	7	3	4

=== Top half ===
First round
WC	(United Kingdom) A Foster (United Kingdom) M Petchey	6	3
(Australia) S Stolle (Australia) J Stoltenberg	7	6
(United States) P Annacone (United States) K Jones	4	6	4
(Switzerland) J Hlasek (United States) T Martin	6	4	6
WC	(United Kingdom) J Bates (Germany) M-K Goellner	3	4
8	(South Africa) W Ferreira (Germany) M Stich	6	6
(United States) M Briggs (United States) T Kronemann	5	3
Q	(Sweden) J Björkman (Australia) P Rafter	7	6
(Sweden) S Edberg (Argentina) J Frana	6	6
WC	(United States) I Lendl (South Africa) C van Rensburg	4	4
(Germany) B Becker (Germany) P Kühnen	7	7
6	(United States) K Flach (United States) R Leach	6	6

Second round
1	(Australia) T Woodbridge (Australia) M Woodforde	7	7
(Australia) S Stolle (Australia) J Stoltenberg	6	5
(Switzerland) J Hlasek (United States) T Martin	2	7	5
8	(South Africa) W Ferreira (Germany) M Stich	6	6	7
4	(Canada) G Connell (United States) P Galbraith	4	4
Q	(Sweden) J Björkman (Australia) P Rafter	6	6
(Sweden) S Edberg (Argentina) J Frana	5	4
(Germany) B Becker (Germany) P Kühnen	7	6

Quarterfinals
1	(Australia) T Woodbridge (Australia) M Woodforde	5	6	6
8	(South Africa) W Ferreira (Germany) M Stich	7	4	3
Q	(Sweden) J Björkman (Australia) P Rafter	6	2
(Germany) B Becker (Germany) P Kühnen	7	6

Semifinals
1	(Australia) T Woodbridge (Australia) M Woodforde	7	6
(Germany) B Becker (Germany) P Kühnen	6	3

=== Bottom half ===
First round
5	(United States) S DeVries (Australia) D Macpherson	3	7	5
(Zimbabwe) B Black (South Africa) B Talbot	6	6	7
(United States) S Davis (United States) J Palmer	6	5	6
(South Africa) S Kruger (United States) B Pearce	4	7	4
(United Kingdom) N Broad (South Africa) G Muller	2	6	6
(South Africa) J-L de Jager (South Africa) M Ondruska	6	1	3
7	(United States) R Reneberg (United States) D Wheaton	6	6
(Canada) G Michibata (United States) D Pate	2	2
Q	(India) L Paes (Italy) L Tieleman	6	3	6
WC	(Croatia) G Ivanišević (United States) P Sampras	3	6	3
(Netherlands) H J Davids (South Africa) P Norval	3	4
(United States) M Keil (United States) D Randall	6	6

Second round
(Zimbabwe) B Black (South Africa) B Talbot	2	3
(United States) S Davis (United States) J Palmer	6	6
(United Kingdom) N Broad (South Africa) G Muller	6	6	6
3	(South Africa) D Visser (Australia) L Warder	7	4	4
7	(United States) R Reneberg (United States) D Wheaton	4	6	4
Q	(India) L Paes (Italy) L Tieleman	6	2	6
(United States) M Keil (United States) D Randall	3	4
2	(Australia) J Fitzgerald (Sweden) A Järryd	6	6

Quarterfinals
(United States) S Davis (United States) J Palmer	4	7	3
(United Kingdom) N Broad (South Africa) G Muller	6	6	6
Q	(India) L Paes (Italy) L Tieleman	5	5
2	(Australia) J Fitzgerald (Sweden) A Järryd	7	7

Semifinals
(United Kingdom) N Broad (South Africa) G Muller	6	6	6
2	(Australia) J Fitzgerald (Sweden) A Järryd	7	4	2
