= Ross Matheson =

Ross Matheson may refer to:

- John Matheson (John Ross Matheson, 1917–2013), Canadian lawyer, judge, and politician
- Ross Matheson (tennis) (born 1970), Scottish tennis player
