= 1989 Stella Artois Championships – Singles =

Singles
- 1989 Stella Artois Championships

Final
- Champion: (Czechoslovakia) Ivan Lendl
- Runner-up: (South Africa) Christo van Rensburg
- Score: 4–6, 6–3, 6–4

Details
- Draw: 64
- Seeds: 16

Events
Singles	Doubles
← 1988 ·	Queen's Club Championships	· 1990 →

Boris Becker was the defending champion but did not compete that year.

Ivan Lendl won in the final 4–6, 6–3, 6–4 against Christo van Rensburg.

== Seeds ==
1. (Czechoslovakia) Ivan Lendl (champion)
2. (Sweden) Stefan Edberg (first round)
3. (Sweden) Mats Wilander (quarterfinals)
4. (United States) Tim Mayotte (second round)
5. (United States) Kevin Curren (second round)
6. (Israel) Amos Mansdorf (first round)
7. (Australia) Darren Cahill (second round)
8. (South Africa) Christo van Rensburg (final)
9. (Soviet Union) Alexander Volkov (first round)
10. (Australia) John Fitzgerald (third round)
11. (Australia) Mark Woodforde (second round)
12. (United States) Paul Annacone (semifinals)
13. (West Germany) Patrik Kühnen (first round)
14. (United States) Derrick Rostagno (semifinals)
15. (West Germany) Eric Jelen (third round)
16. (Australia) Wally Masur (third round)

== Draw ==
=== Key ===
- Q = Qualifier
- WC = Wild card
- LL = Lucky loser
- Alt = Alternate
- SE = Special exempt
- PR = Protected ranking
- ITF = ITF entry
- JE = Junior exempt
- w/o = Walkover
- r = Retired
- d = Defaulted
- SR = Special ranking

=== Finals ===
Semifinals
WC/1	(Czechoslovakia) Ivan Lendl	7	4	7
12	(United States) Paul Annacone	6	6	5
14	(United States) Derrick Rostagno	4	4
8	(South Africa) Christo van Rensburg	6	6

Final
WC/1	(Czechoslovakia) Ivan Lendl	4	6	6
8	(South Africa) Christo van Rensburg	6	3	4

=== Top half ===
==== Section 1 ====
First round
WC/1	(Czechoslovakia) I Lendl	1	6	6
(Sweden) T Svantesson	6	2	1
(United Kingdom) N Broad	3	2
(Australia) M Kratzmann	6	6
(United States) S Davis	7	7
(Soviet Union) A Cherkasov	5	6
(United States) J Grabb	1	4
15	(West Germany) E Jelen	6	6
9	(Soviet Union) A Volkov	5	3
(Portugal) N Marques	7	6
(United States) D Pate	6	3
Q	(United States) J Rive	7	6
(West Germany) M Stich	6	7	6
(Australia) C Limberger	7	6	2
Q	(Canada) G Connell	7	2	4
7	(Australia) D Cahill	5	6	6

Second round
WC/1	(Czechoslovakia) I Lendl	6	6
(Australia) M Kratzmann	2	3
(United States) S Davis	6	1	5
15	(West Germany) E Jelen	3	6	7
(Portugal) N Marques	5	6
Q	(United States) J Rive	7	7
(West Germany) M Stich	7	6
7	(Australia) D Cahill	6	3

Third round
WC/1	(Czechoslovakia) I Lendl	6	6
15	(West Germany) E Jelen	1	3
Q	(United States) J Rive	5	3
(West Germany) M Stich	7	6

Quarterfinals
WC/1	(Czechoslovakia) I Lendl	6	4	6
(West Germany) M Stich	4	6	3

==== Section 2 ====
First round
WC/3	(Sweden) M Wilander	6	6
Q	(United States) R Matuszewski	2	2
(United States) D Wheaton	7	6
(Sweden) N Kulti	6	3
(United States) S Giammalva Jr.	4	6	2
(United States) P Chamberlin	6	4	6
(West Germany) C Saceanu	7	6
13	(West Germany) P Kühnen	6	3
12	(United States) P Annacone	6	6	6
Q	(United States) R Van't Hof	3	7	1
(Australia) S Youl	7	7
(Australia) B Dyke	6	5
(United States) P Sampras	6	7
(Netherlands) T Nijssen	3	6
(United States) R Seguso	4	6	2
5	(United States) K Curren	6	4	6

Second round
WC/3	(Sweden) M Wilander	7	2	6
(United States) D Wheaton	6	6	3
(United States) P Chamberlin	6	6
(West Germany) C Saceanu	4	3
12	(United States) P Annacone	3	7	6
(Australia) S Youl	6	5	4
(United States) P Sampras	6	6
5	(United States) K Curren	3	3

Third round
WC/3	(Sweden) M Wilander	6	6
(United States) P Chamberlin	1	4
12	(United States) P Annacone	6	7	6
(United States) P Sampras	7	5	3

Quarterfinals
WC/3	(Sweden) M Wilander	2	4
12	(United States) P Annacone	6	6

=== Bottom half ===
==== Section 3 ====
First round
6	(Israel) A Mansdorf	6	3	8
(South Africa) G Muller	3	6	10
Q	(United States) B Garnett	4	6
(Canada) C Pridham	6	7
(Australia) B Drewett	2	3
(United States) R Reneberg	6	6
Q	(United States) L Jensen	3	6
11	(Australia) M Woodforde	6	7
14	(United States) D Rostagno	6	6
Q	(France) G Raoux	1	3
(United Kingdom) J Bates	7	6
(Soviet Union) A Olhovskiy	6	3
(India) R Krishnan	1	2
(United States) T Wilkison	6	6
(United States) M Anger	4	6
WC/4	(United States) T Mayotte	6	7

Second round
(South Africa) G Muller	4	6	6
(Canada) C Pridham	6	1	4
(United States) R Reneberg	6	6
11	(Australia) M Woodforde	1	2
14	(United States) D Rostagno	6	6
(United Kingdom) J Bates	2	3
(United States) T Wilkison	6	7
WC/4	(United States) T Mayotte	3	6

Third round
(South Africa) G Muller	3	6	6
(United States) R Reneberg	6	4	2
14	(United States) D Rostagno	6	4	6
(United States) T Wilkison	3	6	2

Quarterfinals
(South Africa) G Muller	7	2	2
14	(United States) D Rostagno	6	6	6

==== Section 4 ====
First round
8	(South Africa) C van Rensburg	7	3	6
(South Africa) D Visser	5	6	3
(United States) L Shiras	6	3	6
(United States) G Layendecker	3	6	8
(South Africa) P Aldrich	4	6	11
(Italy) D Nargiso	6	3	13
(India) Z Ali	2	6
10	(Australia) J Fitzgerald	6	7
16	(Australia) W Masur	6	6	6
(Australia) J Stoltenberg	7	3	2
(Canada) G Michibata	6	7
Q	(Chile) R Acuña	1	6
WC	(United Kingdom) C Bailey	4	6	17
(United States) J Canter	6	4	15
(Venezuela) N Pereira	7	7
2	(Sweden) S Edberg	6	6

Second round
8	(South Africa) C van Rensburg	6	6
(United States) G Layendecker	2	1
(Italy) D Nargiso	3	1
10	(Australia) J Fitzgerald	6	6
16	(Australia) W Masur	7	6
(Canada) G Michibata	6	3
WC	(United Kingdom) C Bailey	6	7
(Venezuela) N Pereira	3	6

Third round
8	(South Africa) C van Rensburg	7	6
10	(Australia) J Fitzgerald	6	3
16	(Australia) W Masur	6	4
WC	(United Kingdom) C Bailey	7	6

Quarterfinals
8	(South Africa) C van Rensburg	6	6
WC	(United Kingdom) C Bailey	2	4
