= 1987 Stella Artois Championships =

- Date: 8–15 June
- Edition: 85th
- Category: Grand Prix
- Draw: 64S / 32D
- Prize money: $250,000
- Surface: Grass / outdoor
- Location: London, United Kingdom
- Venue: Queen's Club

Champions

Singles
- (West Germany) Boris Becker

Doubles
- (France) Guy Forget / (France) Yannick Noah
← 1986 ·	Queen's Club Championships	· 1988 →

The 1987 Stella Artois Championships was a men's tennis tournament played on grass courts at the Queen's Club in London, United Kingdom that was part of the 1987 Nabisco Grand Prix circuit. It was the 85th edition of the tournament and was held from 8 June until 15 June 1987. First-seeded Boris Becker won the singles title.

== Finals ==
=== Singles ===
(West Germany) Boris Becker defeated (United States) Jimmy Connors 6–7, 6–3, 6–4

- It was Becker's 6th title of the year and the 18th of his career.

=== Doubles ===
(France) Guy Forget / (France) Yannick Noah defeated (United States) Rick Leach / (United States) Tim Pawsat 6–4, 6–4

- It was Forget's 5th title of the year and the 14th of his career. It was Noah's 6th title of the year and the 34th of his career.
