= 1986 Stella Artois Championships – Doubles =

Doubles
- 1986 Stella Artois Championships

Final
- Champions: (United States) Kevin Curren (France) Guy Forget
- Runners-up: (Australia) Darren Cahill (Australia) Mark Kratzmann
- Score: 6–2, 7–6

Details
- Draw: 32

Events
| Singles | Doubles |
| ← 1985 · | Queen's Club Championships | · 1987 → |

Ken Flach and Robert Seguso were the defending champions but lost in the quarterfinals to Broderick Dyke and Wally Masur.

Kevin Curren and Guy Forget won in the final 6–2, 7–6 against Darren Cahill and Mark Kratzmann.

== Seeds ==
1. (United States) Ken Flach / (United States) Robert Seguso (quarterfinals)
2. (Sweden) Stefan Edberg / (Sweden) Anders Järryd (first round)
3. (West Germany) Boris Becker / (Socialist Federal Republic of Yugoslavia) Slobodan Živojinović (second round)
4. (Australia) Mark Edmondson / (Australia) Kim Warwick (first round)
5. (United States) Paul Annacone / (South Africa) Christo van Rensburg (quarterfinals)
6. (Australia) John Fitzgerald / (Australia) Paul McNamee (second round)
7. (United States) Gary Donnelly / (United States) Peter Fleming (first round)
8. (United States) Kevin Curren / (France) Guy Forget (champions)

== Draw ==
=== Key ===
- Q = Qualifier
- WC = Wild card
- LL = Lucky loser
- Alt = Alternate
- SE = Special exempt
- PR = Protected ranking
- ITF = ITF entry
- JE = Junior exempt
- w/o = Walkover
- r = Retired
- d = Defaulted
- SR = Special ranking

=== Final ===
Semifinals
(Australia) Broderick Dyke (Australia) Wally Masur | 5 | 5
(Australia) Darren Cahill (Australia) Mark Kratzmann | 7 | 7
(South Africa) Christo Steyn (South Africa) Danie Visser | 4 | 4
8 | (United States) Kevin Curren (France) Guy Forget | 6 | 6

Final
(Australia) Darren Cahill (Australia) Mark Kratzmann | 2 | 6
8 | (United States) Kevin Curren (France) Guy Forget | 6 | 7

=== Top half ===
First round
1 | (United States) K Flach (United States) R Seguso | 6 | 6
(Poland) W Fibak (Brazil) C Motta | 4 | 4
(New Zealand) K Evernden (United States) C Hooper | 7 | 6
(United States) M Robertson (United States) T Warneke | 5 | 1
(United States) D Pate (United States) K Richter | 7 | 7
(United States) A Kohlberg (United States) S Stewart | 5 | 6
(Australia) B Dyke (Australia) W Masur | 6 | 3 | 10
7 | (United States) G Donnelly (United States) P Fleming | 4 | 6 | 8
3 | (West Germany) B Becker (Socialist Federal Republic of Yugoslavia) S Živojinović | 6 | 7
(United States) B Gilbert (United States) B Teacher | 4 | 6
(Australia) D Cahill (Australia) M Kratzmann | 7 | 6
(United Kingdom) J Bates (Netherlands) M Schapers | 6 | 4
(United States) D Dowlen (Canada) G Michibata | 6 | 7 | 6
(United Kingdom) C Dowdeswell (Australia) D Graham | 7 | 5 | 4
WC | (Mexico) L Lavalle (Mexico) R Ramírez | 6 | 6 | 2
5 | (United States) P Annacone (South Africa) C van Rensburg | 7 | 3 | 6

Second round
1 | (United States) K Flach (United States) R Seguso | 6 | 6 | 8
(New Zealand) K Evernden (United States) C Hooper | 7 | 4 | 6
(United States) D Pate (United States) K Richter | 3 | 6 | 1
(Australia) B Dyke (Australia) W Masur | 6 | 1 | 6
3 | (West Germany) B Becker (Socialist Federal Republic of Yugoslavia) S Živojinović
(Australia) D Cahill (Australia) M Kratzmann | w/o
(United States) D Dowlen (Canada) G Michibata | 3 | 3
5 | (United States) P Annacone (South Africa) C van Rensburg | 6 | 6

Quarterfinals
1 | (United States) K Flach (United States) R Seguso | 7 | 6 | 4
(Australia) B Dyke (Australia) W Masur | 6 | 7 | 6
(Australia) D Cahill (Australia) M Kratzmann | 7 | 7
5 | (United States) P Annacone (South Africa) C van Rensburg | 6 | 6

Semifinals
(Australia) B Dyke (Australia) W Masur | 5 | 5
(Australia) D Cahill (Australia) M Kratzmann | 7 | 7

=== Bottom half ===
First round
6 | (Australia) J Fitzgerald (Australia) P McNamee | 6 | 6
(South Africa) E Edwards (Paraguay) F González | 4 | 4
(United States) S Denton (United Kingdom) J Lloyd | 7 | 7
(United States) M Leach (United States) T Wilkison | 5 | 6
WC | (United Kingdom) D Felgate (United Kingdom) S Shaw | 6 | 4
(United States) S Giammalva Jr. (United States) T Witsken | 7 | 6
(South Africa) C Steyn (South Africa) D Visser | 4 | 6 | 12
4 | (Australia) M Edmondson (Australia) K Warwick | 6 | 4 | 10
8 | (United States) K Curren (France) G Forget | 6 | 7
WC | (India) V Amritraj (United States) L Shiras | 2 | 6
(United States) M De Palmer (United States) C Dunk | 6 | 3 | 2
(United States) C B Cox (Nigeria) N Odizor | 3 | 6 | 6
(United States) M Davis (Australia) B Drewett | 4 | 3
(South Africa) B Levine (Australia) L Warder | 6 | 6
(Chile) R Acuña (United States) T Gullikson | 7 | 3 | 6
2 | (Sweden) S Edberg (Sweden) A Järryd | 6 | 6 | 3

Second round
6 | (Australia) J Fitzgerald (Australia) P McNamee | 5 | 6 | 9
(United States) S Denton (United Kingdom) J Lloyd | 7 | 3 | 11
(United States) S Giammalva Jr. (United States) T Witsken | 1 | 2
(South Africa) C Steyn (South Africa) D Visser | 6 | 6
8 | (United States) K Curren (France) G Forget | 7 | 6
(United States) C B Cox (Nigeria) N Odizor | 6 | 4
(South Africa) B Levine (Australia) L Warder | 6 | 6 | 3
(Chile) R Acuña (United States) T Gullikson | 7 | 3 | 6

Quarterfinals
(United States) S Denton (United Kingdom) J Lloyd | 1 | 6
(South Africa) C Steyn (South Africa) D Visser | 6 | 7
8 | (United States) K Curren (France) G Forget | 6 | 7 | 8
(Chile) R Acuña (United States) T Gullikson | 7 | 5 | 6

Semifinals
(South Africa) C Steyn (South Africa) D Visser | 4 | 4
8 | (United States) K Curren (France) G Forget | 6 | 6
