= 1985 Stella Artois Championships – Singles =

Singles
- 1985 Stella Artois Championships

Final
- Champion: (West Germany) Boris Becker
- Runner-up: (United States) Johan Kriek
- Score: 6–2, 6–3

Details
- Draw: 64
- Seeds: 16

Events
Singles	Doubles
← 1984 ·	Queen's Club Championships	· 1986 →

John McEnroe was the defending champion but did not compete that year.

Boris Becker won the singles title at the 1985 Queen's Club Championships tennis tournament defeating Johan Kriek in the final 6–2, 6–3.

== Seeds ==
1. (United States) Jimmy Connors (first round)
2. (United States) Kevin Curren (third round)
3. (Australia) Pat Cash (quarterfinals)
4. (United States) Johan Kriek (final)
5. (United States) Tim Mayotte (quarterfinals)
6. (France) Henri Leconte (second round)
7. (United States) Scott Davis (first round)
8. (United States) David Pate (third round)
9. (United States) Paul Annacone (quarterfinals)
10. (United States) Greg Holmes (first round)
11. (West Germany) Boris Becker (champion)
12. (India) Ramesh Krishnan (third round)
13. (United States) Mike Leach (first round)
14. (United States) Ben Testerman (first round)
15. (United States) Terry Moor (first round)
16. (United States) Sammy Giammalva Jr. (second round)

== Draw ==
=== Key ===
- Q = Qualifier
- WC = Wild card
- LL = Lucky loser
- Alt = Alternate
- SE = Special exempt
- PR = Protected ranking
- ITF = ITF entry
- JE = Junior exempt
- w/o = Walkover
- r = Retired
- d = Defaulted
- SR = Special ranking

=== Finals ===
Semifinals
(Australia) Paul McNamee	1	4
11	(West Germany) Boris Becker	6	6
4	(United States) Johan Kriek	6	6
(Socialist Federal Republic of Yugoslavia) Slobodan Živojinović	4	4

Final
11	(West Germany) Boris Becker	6	6
4	(United States) Johan Kriek	2	3

=== Top half ===
==== Section 1 ====
First round
1	(United States) J Connors	5	3
Q	(United States) M De Palmer	7	6
(Australia) W Masur	7	7
(United States) M Davis	6	5
(Australia) P McNamee	6	6
(United States) C Hooper	1	4
(United States) S Meister	1	1
16	(United States) S Giammalva Jr.	6	6
13	(United States) M Leach	6	6	7
WC	(Poland) W Fibak	3	7	9
(United Kingdom) J Lloyd	6	6
(United States) M Mitchell	2	3
(United States) J Lapidus	4	6
(United States) T Gullikson	6	7
(Brazil) C Motta	6	1	1
5	(United States) T Mayotte	4	6	6

Second round
Q	(United States) M De Palmer	7	7
(Australia) W Masur	6	5
(Australia) P McNamee	6	6
16	(United States) S Giammalva Jr.	1	2
WC	(Poland) W Fibak	7	6
(United Kingdom) J Lloyd	6	3
(United States) T Gullikson	6	6
5	(United States) T Mayotte	7	7

Third round
Q	(United States) M De Palmer	2	6
(Australia) P McNamee	6	7
WC	(Poland) W Fibak	0	4
5	(United States) T Mayotte	6	6

Quarterfinals
(Australia) P McNamee	7	7
5	(United States) T Mayotte	6	5

==== Section 2 ====
First round
WC/3	(Australia) P Cash	6	7
(Australia) P Doohan	3	6
(United States) L Bourne	1	4
(India) V Amritraj	6	6
(Australia) M Edmondson	6	6
(United States) M Flur	1	1
(New Zealand) C Lewis	5	6	6
10	(United States) G Holmes	7	2	3
11	(West Germany) B Becker	7	7
(United States) T Nelson	6	5
Q	(South Africa) D Visser	6	6	4
(United States) D Cassidy	7	4	6
WC	(United States) S Denton	1	6
(United States) L Stefanki	6	7
(South Africa) C van Rensburg	5	7	3
8	(United States) D Pate	7	6	6

Second round
WC/3	(Australia) P Cash	6	6
(India) V Amritraj	2	3
(Australia) M Edmondson	6	7	6
(New Zealand) C Lewis	7	6	4
11	(West Germany) B Becker	6	7
(United States) D Cassidy	4	6
(United States) L Stefanki	6	1	4
8	(United States) D Pate	4	6	6

Third round
WC/3	(Australia) P Cash	7	4	10
(Australia) M Edmondson	6	6	8
11	(West Germany) B Becker	6	6	6
8	(United States) D Pate	4	7	3

Quarterfinals
WC/3	(Australia) P Cash	4	4
11	(West Germany) B Becker	6	6

=== Bottom half ===
==== Section 3 ====
First round
7	(United States) S Davis	5	3
(Australia) J Fitzgerald	7	6
(United States) P Fleming	4	6	1
Q	(South Africa) E Edwards	6	3	6
(New Zealand) R Simpson	4	6	11
Q	(United States) J Canter	6	3	9
(United States) L Shiras	6	7
15	(United States) T Moor	4	5
12	(India) R Krishnan	6	6
Q	(South Africa) B Moir	1	4
(Australia) J Frawley	5	4
(United States) M Bauer	7	6
Q	(Socialist Federal Republic of Yugoslavia) M Ostoja	6	7
(United States) R Harmon	4	6
Q	(United States) T Cain	6	0	1
4	(United States) J Kriek	4	6	6

Second round
(Australia) J Fitzgerald	6	7
Q	(South Africa) E Edwards	1	6
(New Zealand) R Simpson	6	6	6
(United States) L Shiras	7	1	3
12	(India) R Krishnan	6	6
(United States) M Bauer	4	4
Q	(Socialist Federal Republic of Yugoslavia) M Ostoja	2	6
4	(United States) J Kriek	6	7

Third round
(Australia) J Fitzgerald	4	6
(New Zealand) R Simpson	6	7
15	(India) R Krishnan	3	3
4	(United States) J Kriek	6	6

Quarterfinals
(New Zealand) R Simpson	4	6
4	(United States) J Kriek	6	7

==== Section 4 ====
First round
6	(France) H Leconte	6	6
(United States) J Turpin	3	2
WC	(United Kingdom) N Fulwood	1	4
(Socialist Federal Republic of Yugoslavia) S Živojinović	6	6
(France) G Forget	6	3	12
(Paraguay) F González	4	6	14
Q	(Chile) R Acuña	5	6	6
14	(United States) B Testerman	7	2	3
9	(United States) P Annacone	6	6	6
(Nigeria) N Odizor	1	7	4
(United States) B Teacher	6	6
(United States) T Wilkison	7	7
(United States) H Pfister	6	7
(United States) B Green	3	6
(United States) J Sadri	4	4
2	(United States) K Curren	6	6

Second round
6	(France) H Leconte	4	4
(Socialist Federal Republic of Yugoslavia) S Živojinović	6	6
(Paraguay) F González	4	2
Q	(Chile) R Acuña	6	6
9	(United States) P Annacone	6	5	8
(United States) T Wilkison	4	7	6
(United States) H Pfister	6	6
2	(United States) K Curren	7	7

Third round
(Socialist Federal Republic of Yugoslavia) S Živojinović	6	6
Q	(Chile) R Acuña	2	4
9	(United States) P Annacone	6	7	8
2	(United States) K Curren	7	6	6

Quarterfinals
(Socialist Federal Republic of Yugoslavia) S Živojinović	7	6
9	(United States) P Annacone	6	1
