= 1985 Stella Artois Championships =

- Date: 10–17 June
- Edition: 83rd
- Category: Grand Prix
- Draw: 64S / 32D
- Prize money: $200,000
- Surface: Grass / outdoor
- Location: London, United Kingdom
- Venue: Queen's Club

Champions

Singles
- (West Germany) Boris Becker

Doubles
- (United States) Ken Flach / (United States) Robert Seguso
| ← 1984 · | Queen's Club Championships | · 1986 → |

The 1985 Stella Artois Championships was a men's tennis tournament played on grass courts at the Queen's Club in London, United Kingdom that was part of the 1985 Nabisco Grand Prix circuit. It was the 83rd edition of the tournament and ran from 10 June until 17 June 1985. Boris Becker, who was seeded 11th, won the singles title.

== Finals ==
=== Singles ===
(West Germany) Boris Becker defeated (United States) Johan Kriek 6–2, 6–3

- It was Becker's 1st singles title of his career.

=== Doubles ===
(United States) Ken Flach / (United States) Robert Seguso defeated (Australia) Pat Cash / (Australia) John Fitzgerald 3–6, 6–3, 16–14

- It was Flach's 4th title of the year and the 10th of his career. It was Seguso's 4th title of the year and the 10th of his career.
