= 1992 Stella Artois Championships – Singles =

Singles
- 1992 Stella Artois Championships

Final
- Champion: (South Africa) Wayne Ferreira
- Runner-up: (Japan) Shuzo Matsuoka
- Score: 6–3, 6–4

Details
- Draw: 56
- Seeds: 16

Events
Singles	Doubles
← 1991 ·	Queen's Club Championships	· 1993 →

Stefan Edberg was the defending champion but lost in the semifinals to Shuzo Matsuoka.

Wayne Ferreira won in the final 6–3, 6–4 against Matsuoka.

== Seeds ==
The top eight seeds received a bye to the second round.

1. (Sweden) Stefan Edberg (semifinals)
2. (United States) Pete Sampras (quarterfinals)
3. (Germany) Boris Becker (second round)
4. (France) Guy Forget (second round)
5. (Croatia) Goran Ivanišević (third round)
6. (Czechoslovakia) Ivan Lendl (second round)
7. (United States) Brad Gilbert (semifinals)
8. (Switzerland) Jakob Hlasek (second round)
9. (United States) David Wheaton (third round)
10. (Israel) Amos Mansdorf (third round)
11. (United States) MaliVai Washington (second round)
12. (South Africa) Wayne Ferreira (champion)
13. (France) Arnaud Boetsch (second round)
14. (Australia) Todd Woodbridge (second round)
15. (Italy) Gianluca Pozzi (third round)
16. (Sweden) Anders Järryd (first round)

== Draw ==
=== Key ===
- Q = Qualifier
- WC = Wild card
- LL = Lucky loser
- Alt = Alternate
- SE = Special exempt
- PR = Protected ranking
- ITF = ITF entry
- JE = Junior exempt
- w/o = Walkover
- r = Retired
- d = Defaulted
- SR = Special ranking

=== Finals ===
Semifinals
1	(Sweden) Stefan Edberg	6	6^{6}	8
(Japan) Shuzo Matsuoka	1	7^{8}	10
12	(South Africa) Wayne Ferreira	7^{8}	6
7	(United States) Brad Gilbert	6^{6}	4

Final
(Japan) Shuzo Matsuoka	3	4
12	(South Africa) Wayne Ferreira	6	6

=== Top half ===
==== Section 1 ====
First round
(United States) T Witsken	4	5
(United States) K Curren	6	7
Q	(Czechoslovakia) B Stanković	6	3	4
(Italy) D Nargiso	4	6	6
(Australia) W Masur	7^{7}	3	6
16	(Sweden) A Järryd	6^{2}	6	1
10	(Israel) A Mansdorf	6	6
Q	(United Kingdom) D Sapsford	1	4
Q	(France) P Pech	6	7^{7}
(United States) P McEnroe	4	6^{3}
WC	(Australia) P Cash	6	6
(United States) J Tarango	1	1

Second round
1	(Sweden) S Edberg	7^{7}	6
(United States) K Curren	6^{4}	2
(Italy) D Nargiso	6	3	4
(Australia) W Masur	4	6	6
10	(Israel) A Mansdorf	6	6
Q	(France) P Pech	4	4
WC	(Australia) P Cash	6	7
8	(Switzerland) J Hlasek	4	5

Third round
1	(Sweden) S Edberg	6	6^{5}	6
(Australia) W Masur	4	7^{7}	4
10	(Israel) A Mansdorf	4	3
WC	(Australia) P Cash	6	6

Quarterfinals
1	(Sweden) S Edberg	6^{7}	7^{7}	6
WC	(Australia) P Cash	7^{9}	6^{4}	3

==== Section 2 ====
First round
(South Africa) C van Rensburg	6	1	6
(Germany) K Braasch	1	6	3
WC	(United Kingdom) J Bates	3	4
(France) G Raoux	6	6
(Brazil) D Marcelino	7^{7}	3	1
14	(Australia) T Woodbridge	6^{9}	6	6
11	(United States) M Washington	6	6
(Mexico) L Lavalle	3	4
(Germany) A Thoms	6^{4}	3
(Japan) S Matsuoka	7^{7}	6
(Australia) R Fromberg	6^{2}	3
(Australia) S Stolle	7^{7}	6

Second round
3	(Germany) B Becker	4	3
(South Africa) C van Rensburg	6	6
(France) G Raoux	6	6
14	(Australia) T Woodbridge	2	2
11	(United States) M Washington	6	5	3
(Japan) S Matsuoka	4	7	6
(Australia) S Stolle	6^{5}	3
5	(Croatia) G Ivanišević	7^{7}	6

Third round
(South Africa) C van Rensburg	7	4	0
(France) G Raoux	5	6	6
(Japan) S Matsuoka	6	6
5	(Croatia) G Ivanišević	4	3

Quarterfinals
(France) G Raoux	4	6	7
(Japan) S Matsuoka	6	3	9

=== Bottom half ===
==== Section 3 ====
First round
(Argentina) J Frana	7	2	13
(Germany) P Kühnen	5	6	15
WC	(United Kingdom) C Wilkinson	6	6
Q	(Australia) P Rafter	3	3
(Commonwealth of Independent States) D Poliakov	2	6	0
12	(South Africa) W Ferreira	6	3	6
13	(France) A Boetsch	6^{2}	6	6
(South Africa) G Muller	7^{7}	4	1
Q	(United States) D Pate	6	3	1
(United States) T Martin	3	6	6
(Australia) J Stoltenberg	6	6^{6}	6
(Australia) J Fitzgerald	4	7^{8}	3

Second round
6	(Czechoslovakia) I Lendl	6^{7}	6	1
(Germany) P Kühnen	7^{9}	3	6
WC	(United Kingdom) C Wilkinson	3	4
12	(South Africa) W Ferreira	6	6
13	(France) A Boetsch	5	3
(United States) T Martin	7	6
(Australia) J Stoltenberg	3	6	6
4	(France) G Forget	6	1	4

Third round
(Germany) P Kühnen	5	3
12	(South Africa) W Ferreira	7	6
(United States) T Martin	1	2
(Australia) J Stoltenberg	6	6

Quarterfinals
12	(South Africa) W Ferreira	6	6
(Australia) J Stoltenberg	4	2

==== Section 4 ====
First round
(Brazil) F Roese	6^{9}	3
(Canada) C Pridham	7^{11}	6
Q	(Canada) D Nestor	6	6^{5}	0
(United States) F Montana	4	7^{7}	6
Q	(Sweden) N Kroon	3	6	4
9	(United States) D Wheaton	6	4	6
15	(Italy) G Pozzi	6	2	6
(Italy) M Cierro	3	6	2
(Zimbabwe) B Black	3	6	6
(Czechoslovakia) M Střelba	6	1	4
(Australia) M Woodforde	4	7^{7}	6
(Canada) G Connell	6	6^{1}	2

Second round
7	(United States) B Gilbert	7^{7}	6
(Canada) C Pridham	6^{5}	4
(United States) F Montana	1	2
9	(United States) D Wheaton	6	6
15	(Italy) G Pozzi	5	6	6
(Zimbabwe) B Black	7	3	0
(Australia) M Woodforde	1	3
2	(United States) P Sampras	6	6

Third round
7	(United States) B Gilbert	6	5	11
9	(United States) D Wheaton	4	7	9
15	(Italy) G Pozzi	6^{2}	5
2	(United States) P Sampras	7^{7}	7

Quarterfinals
7	(United States) B Gilbert	6	6
2	(United States) P Sampras	3	4
