= 1991 Stella Artois Championships =

- Date: 10–17 June 1991
- Edition: 89th
- Category: World Series
- Draw: 64S / 32D
- Prize money: $450,000
- Surface: Grass / outdoor
- Location: London, United Kingdom
- Venue: Queen's Club

Champions

Singles
- (Sweden) Stefan Edberg

Doubles
- (Australia) Todd Woodbridge / (Australia) Mark Woodforde
← 1990 ·	Queen's Club Championships	· 1992 →

The 1991 Stella Artois Championships, also known as the Queen's Club Championships, was a men's tennis tournament played on grass courts at the Queen's Club in London in the United Kingdom and was part of the World Series of the 1991 ATP Tour. It was the 89th edition of the tournament and was held from 10 through 17 June 1991. Stefan Edberg won the singles event and Todd Woodbridge / Mark Woodforde won the doubles title.

== Finals ==
=== Singles ===
(Sweden) Stefan Edberg defeated (United States) David Wheaton 6–2, 6–3

- It was Edberg's 3rd title of the year and the 45th of his career.

=== Doubles ===
(Australia) Todd Woodbridge / (Australia) Mark Woodforde defeated (Canada) Grant Connell / (Canada) Glenn Michibata 6–4, 7–6

- It was Woodbridge's 3rd title of the year and the 5th of his career. It was Woodforde's 3rd title of the year and the 10th of his career.
