= 1985 Stella Artois Championships – Doubles =

Doubles
- 1985 Stella Artois Championships

Final
- Champions: (United States) Ken Flach (United States) Robert Seguso
- Runners-up: (Australia) Pat Cash (Australia) John Fitzgerald
- Score: 3–6, 6–3, 16–14

Details
- Draw: 32

Events
| Singles | Doubles |
| ← 1984 · | Queen's Club Championships | · 1986 → |

Pat Cash and Paul McNamee were the defending champions but they competed with different partners that year, Cash with John Fitzgerald and McNamee with Peter McNamara.

McNamara and McNamee lost in the quarterfinals to Cash and Fitzgerald.

Ken Flach and Robert Seguso won the doubles title at the 1985 Queen's Club Championships tennis tournament defeating Ken Flach and Robert Seguso in the final 6–3, 3–6, 16–14.

== Seeds ==
1. (United States) Ken Flach / (United States) Robert Seguso (champions)
2. (Australia) Pat Cash / (Australia) John Fitzgerald (final)
3. n/a
4. (United States) Paul Annacone / (South Africa) Christo van Rensburg (first round)
5. (Australia) Mark Edmondson / (Australia) Kim Warwick (quarterfinals)
6. (Australia) Broderick Dyke / (Australia) Wally Masur (second round)
7. (Paraguay) Francisco González / (United States) Matt Mitchell (second round)
8. (United States) Kevin Curren / (United States) Johan Kriek (second round)

== Draw ==
=== Key ===
- Q = Qualifier
- WC = Wild card
- LL = Lucky loser
- Alt = Alternate
- SE = Special exempt
- PR = Protected ranking
- ITF = ITF entry
- JE = Junior exempt
- w/o = Walkover
- r = Retired
- d = Defaulted
- SR = Special ranking

=== Final ===
Semifinals
1 | (United States) Ken Flach (United States) Robert Seguso | 6 | 7
(United States) Gary Donnelly (United States) Tim Wilkison | 2 | 6
(India) Vijay Amritraj (United Kingdom) John Lloyd | 6 | 2 | 7
2 | (Australia) Pat Cash (Australia) John Fitzgerald | 2 | 6 | 9

Final
1 | (United States) Ken Flach (United States) Robert Seguso | 3 | 6 | 16
2 | (Australia) Pat Cash (Australia) John Fitzgerald | 6 | 3 | 14

=== Top half ===
First round
1 | (United States) K Flach (United States) R Seguso | 6 | 7
(West Germany) A Maurer (New Zealand) R Simpson | 4 | 6
(United States) Tim Gullikson (United States) Tom Gullikson | 6 | 6
(United States) P Fleming (United States) B Teacher | 4 | 3
(United States) T Giammalva (United States) S Giammalva, Jr. | 7 | 6
(United Kingdom) D Felgate (United Kingdom) N Fulwood | 6 | 3
(United States) S Meister (South Africa) D Visser | 4 | 6
5 | (Australia) M Edmondson (Australia) K Warwick | 6 | 7
4 | (United States) P Annacone (South Africa) C van Rensburg | 6 | 4 | 11
(United States) G Donnelly (United States) T Wilkison | 4 | 6 | 13
(United States) G Layendecker (Canada) G Michibata | 6 | 6 | 3
(United States) S Davis (United States) S Denton | 4 | 7 | 6
(Australia) B Drewett (New Zealand) C Lewis | 3 | 4
(United States) D Dowlen (Nigeria) N Odizor | 6 | 6
(United States) M Bauer (Brazil) C Motta | 4 | 4
8 | (United States) K Curren (United States) J Kriek | 6 | 6

Second round
1 | (United States) K Flach (United States) R Seguso | 6 | 6
(United States) Tim Gullikson (United States) Tom Gullikson | 3 | 4
(United States) T Giammalva (United States) S Giammalva, Jr. | 6 | 2 | 6
5 | (Australia) M Edmondson (Australia) K Warwick | 4 | 6 | 8
(United States) G Donnelly (United States) T Wilkison | 6 | 6
(United States) S Davis (United States) S Denton | 4 | 4
(United States) D Dowlen (Nigeria) N Odizor | 7 | 5 | 6
8 | (United States) K Curren (United States) J Kriek | 6 | 7 | 4

Quarterfinals
1 | (United States) K Flach (United States) R Seguso | 4 | 6 | 12
5 | (Australia) M Edmondson (Australia) K Warwick | 6 | 4 | 10
(United States) G Donnelly (United States) T Wilkison | 6 | 6 | 6
(United States) D Dowlen (Nigeria) N Odizor | 3 | 7 | 3

Semifinals
1 | (United States) K Flach (United States) R Seguso | 6 | 7
(United States) G Donnelly (United States) T Wilkison | 2 | 6

=== Bottom half ===
First round
7 | (Paraguay) F González (United States) M Mitchell | 7 | 3 | 6
(West Germany) B Becker (United States) M Leach | 5 | 6 | 3
(Puerto Rico) E Fernandez (Brazil) J Soares | 4 | 7 | 6
(United States) L Bourne (United States) E Korita | 6 | 6 | 4
(Australia) D Graham (Australia) L Warder | 3 | 3
(India) V Amritraj (United Kingdom) J Lloyd | 6 | 6
(Poland) W Fibak (Socialist Federal Republic of Yugoslavia) S Živojinović | 6 | 6 | 5
LL | (United States) L Stefanki (United States) R Van't Hof | 7 | 4 | 7
6 | (Australia) B Dyke (Australia) W Masur | 7 | 6
(Chile) R Acuña (United States) D Gitlin | 6 | 3
(Australia) P McNamara (Australia) P McNamee | 7 | 6
(United States) M De Palmer (United States) B Manson | 6 | 2
(Australia) P Doohan (Australia) M Fancutt | 2 | 4
(United States) H Pfister (United States) B Testerman | 6 | 6
(United States) M Davis (United States) C Dunk | 3 | 3
2 | (Australia) P Cash (Australia) J Fitzgerald | 6 | 6

Second round
7 | (Paraguay) F González (United States) M Mitchell | 4 | 7 | 3
(Puerto Rico) E Fernandez (Brazil) J Soares | 6 | 6 | 6
(India) V Amritraj (United Kingdom) J Lloyd | 6 | 6
LL | (United States) L Stefanki (United States) R Van't Hof | 4 | 2
6 | (Australia) B Dyke (Australia) W Masur | 6 | 7 | 1
(Australia) P McNamara (Australia) P McNamee | 7 | 6 | 6
(United States) H Pfister (United States) B Testerman | 1 | 4
2 | (Australia) P Cash (Australia) J Fitzgerald | 6 | 6

Quarterfinals
(Puerto Rico) E Fernandez (Brazil) J Soares | 7 | 6 | 4
(India) V Amritraj (United Kingdom) J Lloyd | 6 | 7 | 6
(Australia) P McNamara (Australia) P McNamee | 3 | 4
2 | (Australia) P Cash (Australia) J Fitzgerald | 6 | 6

Semifinals
(India) V Amritraj (United Kingdom) J Lloyd | 6 | 2 | 7
2 | (Australia) P Cash (Australia) J Fitzgerald | 2 | 6 | 9
