= 1992 Stella Artois Championships =

- Date: 8–14 June
- Edition: 90th
- Category: World Series
- Draw: 64S / 32D
- Prize money: $475,000
- Surface: Grass / outdoor
- Location: London, United Kingdom
- Venue: Queen's Club

Champions

Singles
- (South Africa) Wayne Ferreira

Doubles
- (Australia) John Fitzgerald / (Sweden) Anders Järryd
← 1991 ·	Queen's Club Championships	· 1993 →

The 1992 Stella Artois Championships was a men's tennis tournament played on grass courts at the Queen's Club in London, United Kingdom and was part of the World Series of the 1992 ATP Tour. It was the 90th edition of the tournament and was held from 8 June until 14 June 1992. Wayne Ferreira, who was seeded 12th, won the singles competition and John Fitzgerald / Anders Järryd won the doubles title.

== Finals ==
=== Singles ===
(South Africa) Wayne Ferreira defeated (Japan) Shuzo Matsuoka 6–3, 6–4

- It was Ferreira's 2nd title of the year and the 4th of his career.

=== Doubles ===
(Australia) John Fitzgerald / (Sweden) Anders Järryd defeated (Croatia) Goran Ivanišević / (Italy) Diego Nargiso 6–4, 7–6

- It was Fitzgerald's 1st title of the year and the 31st of his career. It was Järryd's 1st title of the year and the 56th of his career.
