= 1986 Stella Artois Championships =

- Date: 9–16 June
- Edition: 84th
- Category: Grand Prix
- Draw: 64S / 32D
- Prize money: $200,000
- Surface: Grass / outdoor
- Location: London, United Kingdom
- Venue: Queen's Club

Champions

Singles
- (United States) Tim Mayotte

Doubles
- (United States) Kevin Curren / (France) Guy Forget
← 1985 ·	Queen's Club Championships	· 1987 →

The 1986 Stella Artois Championships was a men's tennis tournament played on outdoor grass courts at the Queen's Club in London in the United Kingdom that was part of the 1986 Nabisco Grand Prix circuit. It was the 84th edition of the tournament and ran from 9 June until 16 June 1986. Eighth-seeded Tim Mayotte won the singles title.

== Finals ==
=== Singles ===
(United States) Tim Mayotte defeated (United States) Jimmy Connors 6–4, 2–1 (Connors retired)

- It was Mayotte's only title of the year and the 3rd of his career.

=== Doubles ===
(United States) Kevin Curren / (France) Guy Forget defeated (Australia) Darren Cahill / (Australia) Mark Kratzmann 6–2, 7–6

- It was Curren's 2nd title of the year and the 21st of his career. It was Forget's 5th title of the year and the 7th of his career.
