= 1990 Stella Artois Championships =

- Date: 11–18 June
- Edition: 88th
- Category: World Series
- Draw: 64S / 32D
- Prize money: $450,000
- Surface: Grass / outdoor
- Location: London, United Kingdom
- Venue: Queen's Club

Champions

Singles
- (Czechoslovakia) Ivan Lendl

Doubles
- (United Kingdom) Jeremy Bates / (United States) Kevin Curren
← 1989 ·	Queen's Club Championships	· 1991 →

The 1990 Stella Artois Championships was a men's tennis tournament played on grass courts at the Queen's Club in London in the United Kingdom and was part of the World Series of the 1990 ATP Tour. It was the 88th edition of the tournament and ran from 11 June through 18 June 1990. Ivan Lendl won the singles title.

== Finals ==
=== Singles ===
(Czechoslovakia) Ivan Lendl defeated (West Germany) Boris Becker 6–3, 6–2

- It was Lendl's 4th title of the year and the 93rd of his career.

=== Doubles ===
(United Kingdom) Jeremy Bates / (United States) Kevin Curren defeated (France) Henri Leconte / (Czechoslovakia) Ivan Lendl 6–2, 7–6

- It was Bates' only title of the year and the 2nd of his career. It was Curren's only title of the year and the 30th of his career.
