= 1987 Stella Artois Championships – Doubles =

Doubles
- 1987 Stella Artois Championships

Final
- Champions: (France) Guy Forget (France) Yannick Noah
- Runners-up: (United States) Rick Leach (United States) Tim Pawsat
- Score: 6–4, 6–4

Details
- Draw: 32

Events
Singles	Doubles
- Queen's Club Championships

Kevin Curren and Guy Forget were the defending champions but they competed with different partners that year, Curren with Brad Pearce and Forget with Yannick Noah.

Curren and Pearce lost in the first round to Stefan Edberg and Mats Wilander.

Forget and Noah won in the final 6–4, 6–4 against Rick Leach and Tim Pawsat.

== Seeds ==
1. (France) Guy Forget / (France) Yannick Noah (champions)
2. (West Germany) Boris Becker / (Socialist Federal Republic of Yugoslavia) Slobodan Živojinović (second round)
3. (Sweden) Stefan Edberg / (Sweden) Mats Wilander (second round)
4. (United States) Gary Donnelly / (United States) Peter Fleming (semifinals)
5. (United States) Chip Hooper / (United States) Mike Leach (quarterfinals)
6. (South Africa) Christo Steyn / (South Africa) Danie Visser (first round)
7. (Australia) Pat Cash / (Australia) John Fitzgerald (semifinals)
8. (Australia) Peter Doohan / (Australia) Laurie Warder (second round)

== Draw ==
Key

- Q = Qualifier
- WC = Wild card
- LL = Lucky loser
- Alt = Alternate
- ITF = ITF entry
- PR = Protected ranking
- SR = Special ranking
- SE = Special exempt
- JE = Junior exempt
- JR = Junior Accelerator Programme entrant
- CO = College Accelerator Programme entrant
- NG = Next Gen Accelerator Program entrant
- w/o = Walkover
- r = Retired
- d = Defaulted

=== Final ===
Semifinals
1	(France) Guy Forget (France) Yannick Noah	7	7
4	(United States) Gary Donnelly (United States) Peter Fleming	6	6
(United States) Rick Leach (United States) Tim Pawsat	5	7	6
7	(Australia) Pat Cash (Australia) John Fitzgerald	7	6	1

Final
1	(France) Guy Forget (France) Yannick Noah	6	6
(United States) Rick Leach (United States) Tim Pawsat	4	4

=== Top half ===
First round
1	(France) G Forget (France) Y Noah	7	7
(Brazil) R Acioly (United States) L Scott	5	5
(Chile) R Acuña (United States) M Freeman	6	6	4
(South Africa) E Edwards (United States) J Letts	7	1	6
(United States) G Layendecker (Canada) G Michibata	6	6
(United States) S Davis (United States) D Pate	7	7
(South Africa) G Muller (United States) T Nelson	6	4
8	(Australia) P Doohan (Australia) L Warder	7	6
4	(United States) G Donnelly (United States) P Fleming	6	4	6
WC	(United Kingdom) J Lloyd (United Kingdom) S Shaw	3	6	4
(United States) L Bourne (United States) J Klaparda	7	6
(United States) M Bauer (Poland) W Fibak	6	3
(Australia) R Barlow (United States) M Purcell	3	2
(Australia) B Dyke (Australia) W Masur	6	6
(Mexico) L Lavalle (West Germany) C Saceanu	4	6	7
5	(United States) C Hooper (United States) M Leach	6	3	9

Second round
1	(France) G Forget (France) Y Noah	6	6
(South Africa) E Edwards (United States) J Letts	4	2
(United States) S Davis (United States) D Pate	6	3	6
8	(Australia) P Doohan (Australia) L Warder	4	6	3
4	(United States) G Donnelly (United States) P Fleming	2	6	6
(United States) L Bourne (United States) J Klaparda	6	1	4
(Australia) B Dyke (Australia) W Masur	6	4
5	(United States) C Hooper (United States) M Leach	7	6

Quarterfinals
1	(France) G Forget (France) Y Noah	6	6
(United States) S Davis (United States) D Pate	1	4
4	(United States) G Donnelly (United States) P Fleming	7	7
5	(United States) C Hooper (United States) M Leach	6	6

Semifinals
1	(France) G Forget (France) Y Noah	7	7
4	(United States) G Donnelly (United States) P Fleming	6	6

=== Bottom half ===
First round
6	(South Africa) C Steyn (South Africa) D Visser	4	6
WC	(United States) H Pfister (United States) L Shiras	6	7
(United States) B Testerman (United States) T Wilkison	7	6	5
(United States) R Leach (United States) T Pawsat	6	7	7
(Australia) C Limberger (Australia) M Woodforde	7	6
(Australia) P McNamara (Australia) P McNamee	6	3
(United States) K Curren (United States) B Pearce	1	6	5
3	(Sweden) S Edberg (Sweden) M Wilander	6	3	7
7	(Australia) P Cash (Australia) J Fitzgerald	7	6	13
(West Germany) E Jelen (United States) B Scanlon	5	7	11
(United States) K Flach (Australia) S Youl	6	6
(United States) K Jones (United States) T Warneke	3	4
(United States) M Anger (New Zealand) K Evernden	4	7	6
WC	(United Kingdom) J Bates (United Kingdom) A Castle	6	6	1
(Australia) D Cahill (Australia) M Kratzmann	2	0
2	(West Germany) B Becker (Socialist Federal Republic of Yugoslavia) S Živojinović	6	6

Second round
WC	(United States) H Pfister (United States) L Shiras	2	6	5
(United States) R Leach (United States) T Pawsat	6	3	7
(Australia) C Limberger (Australia) M Woodforde	6	7	6
3	(Sweden) S Edberg (Sweden) M Wilander	7	6	3
7	(Australia) P Cash (Australia) J Fitzgerald	6	6	7
(United States) K Flach (Australia) S Youl	3	7	5
(United States) M Anger (New Zealand) K Evernden	6	6
2	(West Germany) B Becker (Socialist Federal Republic of Yugoslavia) S Živojinović	3	4

Quarterfinals
(United States) R Leach (United States) T Pawsat	7	7
(Australia) C Limberger (Australia) M Woodforde	6	5
7	(Australia) P Cash (Australia) J Fitzgerald	6	7
(United States) M Anger (New Zealand) K Evernden	3	5

Semifinals
(United States) R Leach (United States) T Pawsat	5	7	6
7	(Australia) P Cash (Australia) J Fitzgerald	7	6	1
