= 1993 Stella Artois Championships =

- Date: 7–14 June
- Edition: 91st
- Category: World Series
- Draw: 56S / 28D
- Prize money: $600,000
- Surface: Grass / outdoor
- Location: London, United Kingdom
- Venue: Queen's Club

Champions

Singles
- (Germany) Michael Stich

Doubles
- (Australia) Todd Woodbridge / (Australia) Mark Woodforde
| ← 1992 · | Queen's Club Championships | · 1994 → |

The 1993 Stella Artois Championships was a men's tennis tournament played on outdoor grass courts at the Queen's Club in London in the United Kingdom that was part of the World Series of the 1993 ATP Tour. It was the 91st edition of the tournament ran from 7 June until 14 June 1993. Sixth-seeded Michael Stich won the singles title and Todd Woodbridge / Mark Woodforde won the doubles title.

== Finals ==
=== Singles ===
(Germany) Michael Stich defeated (South Africa) Wayne Ferreira 6–3, 6–4

- It was Stich's 3rd singles title of the year and the 10th of his career.

=== Doubles ===
(Australia) Todd Woodbridge / (Australia) Mark Woodforde defeated (United Kingdom) Neil Broad / (South Africa) Gary Muller 6–7, 6–3, 6–4

- It was Woodbridge's 3rd title of the year and the 19th of his career. It was Woodforde's 4th title of the year and the 23rd of his career.
