= Ross Matheson (tennis) =

British tennis player

- Country (sports): (United Kingdom) Great Britain
- Born: 27 May 1970 (age 54); Glasgow, Scotland
- Height: 6 ft 4 in (193 cm)
- Turned pro: 1992
- Plays: Right-handed
- Prize money: $79,011

Singles
- Career record: 1-4
- Career titles: 0
- Highest ranking: No. 241 (12 Jun 1995)

Grand Slam singles results
- Wimbledon: 1R (1993, 1995)

Doubles
- Career record: 2-5
- Career titles: 0
- Highest ranking: No. 216 (28 Aug 1995)

Grand Slam doubles results
- Wimbledon: 2R (1995, 1996)

Ross Matheson (born 27 May 1970) is a former professional tennis player from Scotland.

== College tennis ==
Matheson played collegiate tennis in the United States, first at the University of Oklahoma and then at Arizona State University.

== Professional career ==
Matheson had the best win of his professional career at the 1993 Stella Artois Championships (Queen's), where he defeated 13th seed Jakob Hlasek in the opening round, despite being ranked 563rd in the world.

He appeared in the main singles draw at Wimbledon twice and was beaten in the first round on each occasion, to João Cunha-Silva in 1993 and David Wheaton in 1995, both in four sets.

He is the club manager at the All England Lawn Tennis and Croquet Club (2015).

== Personal life ==
Matheson is the son of Harry Matheson, who competed in the 1963 Wimbledon Championships. His mother, Carole, was also a tennis player. Ross and his wife Pam appeared in a 2021 episode of the Channel 4 TV show Location Location Location. They have two sons.

== Challenger titles ==
=== Singles: (1) ===
| No. | Year | Tournament | Surface | Opponent | Score |
|---|---|---|---|---|---|
| 1. | 1994 | Bristol, Great Britain | Grass | (Germany) Arne Thoms | 6–3, 6–4 |

=== Doubles: (1) ===
| No. | Year | Tournament | Surface | Partner | Opponents | Score |
|---|---|---|---|---|---|---|
| 1. | 1995 | Bronx, United States | Hard | (Australia) Jamie Holmes | (New Zealand) Steven Downs (New Zealand) James Greenhalgh | 6–3, 5–7, 6–3 |
