= Andrew Foster (tennis) =

British tennis player

- Country (sports): United Kingdom
- Born: 16 March 1972 (age 53) Stoke-on-Trent, England, United Kingdom
- Height: 1.91 m (6 ft 3 in)
- Plays: Right-handed
- Prize money: $168,329

Singles
- Career record: 4–6 (at ATP Tour level and Grand Slam level, in and Davis Cup)
- Career titles: 0; 0 Challenger, 0 Futures
- Highest ranking: No. 184 (17 January 1994)

Grand Slam singles results
- Australian Open: Q2 (1994)
- French Open: Q2 (1993, 1994)
- Wimbledon: 4R (1993)

Doubles
- Career record: 8–21 (at ATP Tour level and Grand Slam level, in and Davis Cup)
- Career titles: 0; 4 Challenger, 0 Futures
- Highest ranking: No. 174 (15 November 1993)

Grand Slam doubles results
- Wimbledon: 1R (1992, 1993, 1994, 1995, 1996, 1997, 1998)

Mixed doubles

Grand Slam mixed doubles results
- Wimbledon: 1R (1993, 1994)
- Last updated on: 20 May 2023.

Andrew Foster (born 16 March 1972, in Stoke-on-Trent) is a former tennis player from Great Britain.

The right-hander reached the fourth round of Wimbledon in 1993, in only his second appearance at the All England Club. There, he posted his first ever Tour wins over Thomas Enqvist, Luis Herrera and Andrei Olhovskiy. His run ended in the round of 16 at the tournament, losing to the eventual winner, Pete Sampras.

Foster reached a career-high Association of Tennis Professionals (ATP) singles ranking of World No. 184 in January 1994. In doubles, Foster won four Challenger events, reaching as high as No. 174 in November 1993.

== ATP Challenger and ITF Futures finals ==
=== Singles: 1 (0–1) ===
Legend ATP Challenger (0–1) ITF Futures (0–0)	Finals by surface Hard (0–0) Clay (0–0) Grass (0–1) Carpet (0–0)

Result	W–L	Date	Tournament	Tier	Surface	Opponent	Score
Loss	0–1	Jul 1995	Bristol, United Kingdom	Challenger	Grass	(United Kingdom) Jeremy Bates	7–6, 4–6, 3–6

=== Doubles: 6 (4–2) ===
Legend ATP Challenger (4–2) ITF Futures (0–0)	Finals by surface Hard (3–1) Clay (1–0) Grass (0–0) Carpet (0–1)

Result	W–L	Date	Tournament	Tier	Surface	Partner	Opponents	Score
Win	1–0	Feb 1992	Bangalore, India	Challenger	Clay	(United Kingdom) Nick Brown	(Belgium) Xavier Daufresne (Brazil) Cesar Kist	7–6, 3–6, 7–5
Loss	1–1	Nov 1992	Launceston, Australia	Challenger	Carpet	(United Kingdom) Nick Brown	(Australia) Richard Fromberg (Australia) Patrick Rafter	5–7, 6–7
Loss	1–2	Oct 1993	Gothenburg, Sweden	Challenger	Hard	(United Kingdom) Ross Matheson	(United Kingdom) Jeremy Bates (United Kingdom) Chris Wilkinson	6–7, 3–6
Win	2–2	Oct 1994	Jakarta, Indonesia	Challenger	Hard	(United Kingdom) Danny Sapsford	(India) Leander Paes (India) Mahesh Bhupathi	walkover
Win	3–2	Jul 1995	Newcastle, United Kingdom	Challenger	Hard	(United Kingdom) Danny Sapsford	(Socialist Federal Republic of Yugoslavia) Nebojsa Djordjevic (Switzerland) Lorenzo Manta	3–6, 6–1, 6–2
Win	4–2	Mar 1996	Stockholm, Sweden	Challenger	Hard	(United Kingdom) Danny Sapsford	(South Africa) Lan Bale (South Africa) Brent Haygarth	6–3, 6–1
