= 1988 Stella Artois Championships =

- Date: 6–13 June
- Edition: 86th
- Category: Grand Prix
- Draw: 64S / 32D
- Prize money: $340,000
- Surface: Grass / outdoor
- Location: London, United Kingdom
- Venue: Queen's Club

Champions

Singles
- (West Germany) Boris Becker

Doubles
- (United States) Ken Flach / (United States) Robert Seguso
- Queen's Club Championships

The 1988 Stella Artois Championships was a men's tennis tournament played on grass courts at the Queen's Club in London in the United Kingdom that was part of the 1988 Nabisco Grand Prix circuit. It was the 86th edition of the tournament, running from 6 June until 13 June 1988. Fourth-seeded Boris Becker won the singles title.

== Finals ==
=== Singles ===
(West Germany) Boris Becker defeated (Sweden) Stefan Edberg 6–1, 3–6, 6–3

- It was Becker's 5th title of the year and the 23rd of his career.

=== Doubles ===
(United States) Ken Flach / (United States) Robert Seguso defeated (South Africa) Pieter Aldrich / (South Africa) Danie Visser 6–2, 7–6

- It was Flach's 1st title of the year and the 20th of his career. It was Seguso's 1st title of the year and the 20th of his career.
