= Chris Bailey (tennis) =

British tennis player

- Country (sports): (United Kingdom) Great Britain
- Born: 29 April 1968 (age 58) Norwich, England
- Height: 6 ft 5 in (196 cm)
- Turned pro: 1987
- Retired: 1994
- Plays: Right-handed (one-handed backhand)
- Prize money: $208,917

Singles
- Career record: 17–34
- Career titles: 0
- Highest ranking: No. 126 (2 October 1989)

Grand Slam singles results
- Australian Open: 1R (1988, 1989, 1993)
- Wimbledon: 2R (1987, 1989, 1993)
- US Open: Q3 (1993)

Doubles
- Career record: 3–15
- Career titles: 0
- Highest ranking: No. 211 (22 August 1994)

Chris Bailey (born 29 April 1968) is a former professional tennis player (1987–1994), British No. 1 and ATP world No. 126 (1989), now a television sports commentator on tennis (BBC Sport 1995–2010, Sky Sports 1995–2007) and football (One since February 2010), and a real estate property consultant in Australia.

== Early life ==
Chris D. Bailey was born in Norwich in 1968 and grew up in Norfolk. In 1980 he won the under-12 British Championships, subsequently reaching the semi-finals in the under-16 (1984) and under-18 (1986) Championships. In 1985 he won the Cromer Lawn Tennis & Squash Association tournament, which now incorporates the Men's Open Championship of Norfolk. In 1986 he reached the junior Wimbledon quarter-finals. His nickname is Bails.

== Tennis career ==
Chris became a professional tennis player at the age of 19, in June 1987, with a provisional ranking of 625 in the world, winning his first match against fellow Englishman and world No. 202 Steve Shaw at the Bristol grass court tournament, losing in the next round to former world No. 5 Henri Leconte. Later that month he reached the second round at Wimbledon, losing to future world No. 4 Brad Gilbert.

In June 1989, Chris reached the quarter-finals on grass at Queen's and in August the semi-finals on hard court at Livingston, New Jersey. These contributed to him reaching a career-high world ranking of No. 110 in October 1989, aged 21 years.

However, after a first round defeat at Wimbledon in June 1990, he damaged a ligament during a practice session and underwent right knee surgery in July, not returning to the tour until almost a year later, in June 1991, at Queen's, but only playing in four other ATP tour tournaments during the rest of the year, and none until May 1992. His new coach from about this time was Nick Carr of New Zealand, later a coach of Martin Verkerk from 2001.

At Wimbledon in 1993, entering as a wildcard while only ranked world No. 263, Chris beat world No. 90 Patrick McEnroe (younger brother of John McEnroe) in straight sets in the first round. In the second round Chris took the 5th seed Goran Ivanišević (the previous year's runner-up and 2001 Champion) to 5 sets over 3 hours and 34 minutes until 8.40 pm on Centre Court in front of 14,000 supporters. Chris had won the first set 7–5 and third 7–6^{(3)}, with the second set also going to a tiebreak. In the fifth set Chris had match point at 6–5 on the Ivanisevic serve, with Goran serving a first serve fault and then a let (net cord), before serving a second serve ace to save the point, with Goran going on to finally win the set 9–7.

After Wimbledon, in July 1993, Chris went on to win the Bristol grass court Challenger singles tournament, beating countryman Tim Henman (a future world No. 4) in the quarter-finals and Mark Knowles (a future world No. 1 doubles player) in the final. Chris also reached the final of the 1993 British Championships, losing to 6-times champion Jeremy Bates.

In July 1994, Chris reached the singles semi-finals at Bristol. In August 1994, Chris reached his highest doubles world ranking of No. 211, having won the Bronx, New York, Challenger doubles tournament with 27-year-old Swedish tennis partner Lars-Anders Wahlgren.

A month later, Chris played his last professional match, at the relatively young age of 26, in September 1994, reaching the quarter-finals of the Singapore Challenger doubles event with Wahlgren. He was then ranked world No. 256 in singles, having reached as high as No. 110 in November 1993. Chris was subsequently forced to retire from professional tennis due to injury, after undergoing seven knee operations. He had a career singles win–loss record of 17–34 on the ATP World Tour & Grand Slam circuit (doubles 3–15), with a 57–52 result on the singles ATP Challenger Tour, with total career prize money of $208,917. He competed in singles at 7 Wimbledon (1987–90, 1992–94) and 3 Australian (1988–89, 1993) Slams and also represented Great Britain in European and Davis Cup (twice in 1989) competitions.

== Commentating career ==
In 1995 Chris went to work as a commentator and summariser on BBC TV's Wimbledon tennis coverage and for Sky TV Sports. He also worked as a freelance journalist and regularly commentated on tennis for Eurosport and BBC Radio (e.g. 5 Live). From 2002 until 2004 he was a presenter on Sky Sports News. In 2005 he commentated on his first Wimbledon singles final, with Tracy Austin and John McEnroe. He was also host of Sky Sports tennis Masters Series coverage, regularly appearing with fellow English tennis playing friends Mark Petchey and Barry Cowan. In about March 2007, Chris left Sky, with his host role being taken over by football commentator Marcus Buckland, but Chris continued to commentate annually for the BBC for various Grand Slam events until 2010, such as the Australian Open, having commentated on more than a dozen Wimbledons by 2010.

From 8 February 2010 Chris has appeared as the host of the One HD weekly World football news program.

== Property career ==
In early 2007 Chris was thought to have moved to Florida to set up in the property market. However it was stated later in the year that he had moved to Australia. He was later appointed Senior Manager with CB Richard Ellis in Sydney, focusing on leasing and private client sales across the North Shore area. He is now a Director of GJS Property, formed in 2004 by three ex-Knight Frank consultants, located beside the Sydney 2000 Olympics site, dealing with commercial property predominantly around the North Ryde area.
