= Eric Jelen =

German tennis player

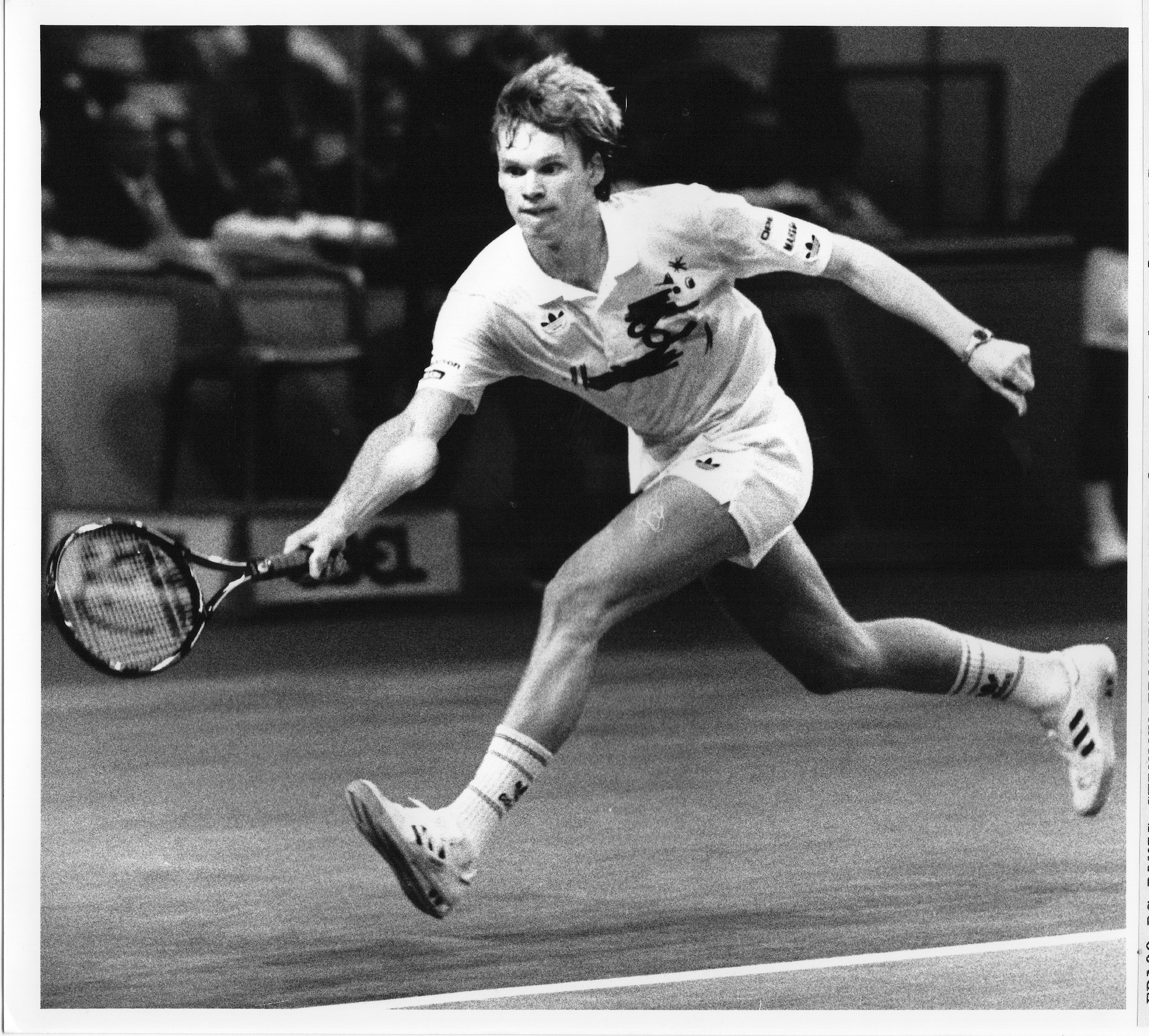
- Germany vs USA in Davis Cup, Frankfurt, 1988
- Country (sports): Germany
- Born: 11 March 1965 (age 61) Trier, West Germany
- Height: 1.80 m (5 ft 11 in)
- Turned pro: 1982
- Retired: 1992
- Plays: Right-handed (one-handed backhand)
- Prize money: $1,100,059

Singles
- Career record: 135–136
- Career titles: 1
- Highest ranking: No. 23 (7 July 1986)

Grand Slam singles results
- Australian Open: 1R (1984, 1990, 1991)
- French Open: 3R (1986)
- Wimbledon: 4R (1986)
- US Open: 3R (1986)

Doubles
- Career record: 111–81
- Career titles: 5
- Highest ranking: No. 18 (12 June 1989)

Grand Slam doubles results
- French Open: 3R (1989)
- Wimbledon: 3R (1988)
- US Open: 2R (1988)

Eric Jelen (born 11 March 1965) is a former tennis player from Germany, who won one singles (1989, Bristol) and five doubles titles during his professional career.

The right-hander Jelen reached his highest singles ATP-ranking on 7 July 1986, when he became World No. 23. Jelen was a member of two Davis Cup-winning teams. In 1988, he teamed with Boris Becker in doubles to earn the win that guaranteed a West German victory over Sweden in the final. The following year, West Germany successfully defended the title by defeating Sweden in the final, and Becker and Jelen again won the doubles match.

Jelen had two spells as coach for Boris Becker, the first spell for the 1992 Wimbledon tournament, and the second spell lasting for seven months from May 1993 to December 1993.

== Career finals ==
=== Singles (1 title – 1 runner-up) ===
Legend
Grand Slam (0–0)
Tennis Masters Cup (0–0)
ATP Masters Series (0–0)
ATP Tour (1–1)

Result	W/L	Date	Tournament	Surface	Opponent	Score
Loss	0–1	Oct 1987	Brisbane, Australia	Hard (i)	(New Zealand) Kelly Evernden	6–3, 1–6, 1–6
Win	1–1	Jun 1989	Bristol, UK	Grass	(United Kingdom) Nick Brown	6–4, 3–6, 7–5

=== Doubles (5 titles – 6 runners-up) ===
Legend
Grand Slam (0–0)
Tennis Masters Cup (0–0)
ATP Masters Series (0–1)
ATP Tour (5–5)

Result	W/L	Date	Tournament	Surface	Partner	Opponents	Score
Loss	0–1	Sep 1986	Hamburg, Germany	Clay	(West Germany) Boris Becker	(Spain) Sergio Casal (Spain) Emilio Sánchez	4–6, 1–6
Loss	0–2	Feb 1987	Indian Wells, U.S.	Hard	(West Germany) Boris Becker	(France) Guy Forget (France) Yannick Noah	4–6, 6–7
Win	1–2	Feb 1988	Milan, Italy	Carpet (i)	(West Germany) Boris Becker	(Czechoslovakia) Miloslav Mečíř (Czechoslovakia) Tomáš Šmíd	6–3, 6–3
Win	2–2	Oct 1988	Brisbane, Australia	Hard (i)	(West Germany) Carl-Uwe Steeb	(Canada) Grant Connell (Canada) Glenn Michibata	6–4, 6–1
Loss	2–3	Oct 1988	Tokyo, Japan	Carpet (i)	(West Germany) Boris Becker	(Ecuador) Andrés Gómez (Socialist Federal Republic of Yugoslavia) Slobodan Živojinović	5–7, 7–5, 3–6
Win	3–3	Feb 1989	Lyon, France	Carpet (i)	(Denmark) Michael Mortensen	(Switzerland) Jakob Hlasek (United States) John McEnroe	6–2, 3–6, 6–3
Loss	3–4	May 1989	Hamburg, Germany	Clay	(West Germany) Boris Becker	(Spain) Emilio Sánchez (Spain) Javier Sánchez	4–6, 1–6
Loss	3–5	Oct 1989	Frankfurt, Germany	Carpet (i)	(United States) Kevin Curren	(South Africa) Pieter Aldrich (South Africa) Danie Visser	6–7, 7–6, 3–6
Loss	3–6	Apr 1991	Barcelona, Spain	Clay	(Germany) Boris Becker	(Argentina) Horacio de la Peña (Italy) Diego Nargiso	6–3, 6–7, 4–6
Win	4–6	Aug 1991	Long Island, U.S.	Hard	(Germany) Carl-Uwe Steeb	(United States) Doug Flach (Italy) Diego Nargiso	0–6, 6–4, 7–6
Win	5–6	Nov 1991	Moscow, Soviet Union	Hard	(Germany) Carl-Uwe Steeb	(Soviet Union) Andrei Cherkasov (Soviet Union) Alexander Volkov	6–4, 7–6
