= 1995 Stella Artois Championships =

- Date: 12–19 June
- Edition: 93rd
- Category: World Series
- Draw: 56S / 28D
- Prize money: $600,000
- Surface: Grass / outdoor
- Location: London, United Kingdom
- Venue: Queen's Club

Champions

Singles
- (United States) Pete Sampras

Doubles
- (United States) Todd Martin / (United States) Pete Sampras
← 1994 ·	Queen's Club Championships	· 1996 →

The 1995 Stella Artois Championships was a men's tennis tournament played on outdoor grass courts at the Queen's Club in London in the United Kingdom and was part of the World Series of the 1995 ATP Tour. It was the 93rd edition of the tournament and was held from 12 June through 19 June 1995. First-seeded Pete Sampras won the singles title.

== Finals ==
=== Singles ===
(United States) Pete Sampras defeated (France) Guy Forget 7–6^{(7–3)}, 7–6^{(8–6)}

- It was Sampras' 2nd title of the year and the 34th of his career.

=== Doubles ===
(United States) Todd Martin / (United States) Pete Sampras defeated (Sweden) Jan Apell / (Sweden) Jonas Björkman 7–6, 6–4

- It was Martin's 3rd title of the year and the 8th of his career. It was Sampras' 3rd title of the year and the 35th of his career.
