= 1994 Stella Artois Championships =

- Date: 6–13 June
- Edition: 92nd
- Category: World Series
- Draw: 56S / 28D
- Prize money: $600,000
- Surface: Grass / outdoor
- Location: London, United Kingdom
- Venue: Queen's Club

Champions

Singles
- (United States) Todd Martin

Doubles
- (Sweden) Jan Apell / (Sweden) Jonas Björkman
← 1993 ·	Queen's Club Championships	· 1995 →

The 1994 Stella Artois Championships was a men's tennis tournament played on grass courts at the Queen's Club in London in the United Kingdom and was part of the World Series of the 1994 ATP Tour. It was the 92nd edition of the tournament and was held from 6 June through 13 June 1994. Fifth-seeded Todd Martin won the singles title.

== Finals ==
=== Singles ===
(United States) Todd Martin defeated (United States) Pete Sampras 7–6^{(7–4)}, 7–6^{(7–4)}

- It was Martin's 2nd title of the year and the 5th of his career.

=== Doubles ===
(Sweden) Jan Apell / (Sweden) Jonas Björkman defeated (Australia) Todd Woodbridge / (Australia) Mark Woodforde 3–6, 7–6, 6–4

- It was Apell's 2nd title of the year and the 3rd of his career. It was Björkman's 3rd title of the year and the 3rd of his career.
