= 1994 Stella Artois Championships – Singles =

Singles
- 1994 Stella Artois Championships

Final
- Champion: (United States) Todd Martin
- Runner-up: (United States) Pete Sampras
- Score: 7–6^{(7–4)}, 7–6^{(7–4)}

Details
- Draw: 56
- Seeds: 16

Events
Singles	Doubles
← 1993 ·	Queen's Club Championships	· 1995 →

Michael Stich was the defending champion but lost in the third round to Jamie Morgan.

Todd Martin won in the final 7–6^{(7–4)}, 7–6^{(7–4)} against Pete Sampras.

== Seeds ==
The top eight seeds received a bye to the second round.

1. (United States) Pete Sampras (final)
2. (Germany) Michael Stich (third round)
3. (Sweden) Stefan Edberg (quarterfinals)
4. (Croatia) Goran Ivanišević (third round)
5. (United States) Todd Martin (champion)
6. (Germany) Boris Becker (second round)
7. (France) Cédric Pioline (second round)
8. (South Africa) Wayne Ferreira (quarterfinals)
9. (Australia) Patrick Rafter (second round)
10. (United States) MaliVai Washington (third round)
11. (Italy) Andrea Gaudenzi (second round)
12. (United States) Richey Reneberg (first round)
13. (Australia) Jason Stoltenberg (third round)
14. (Australia) Mark Woodforde (first round)
15. (Australia) Jamie Morgan (quarterfinals)
16. (Switzerland) Jakob Hlasek (second round)

== Draw ==
=== Key ===
- Q = Qualifier
- WC = Wild card
- LL = Lucky loser
- Alt = Alternate
- SE = Special exempt
- PR = Protected ranking
- ITF = ITF entry
- JE = Junior exempt
- w/o = Walkover
- r = Retired
- d = Defaulted
- SR = Special ranking

=== Finals ===
Semifinals
1	(United States) Pete Sampras	3	7^{7}	6
(Sweden) Jan Apell	6	6^{5}	2
5	(United States) Todd Martin	6	6
Q	(South Africa) Christo van Rensburg	1	4

Final
1	(United States) Pete Sampras	6^{4}	6^{4}
5	(United States) Todd Martin	7^{7}	7^{7}

=== Top half ===
==== Section 1 ====
First round
(Sweden) J Björkman	2	6	6
(South Africa) G Stafford	6	2	1
(Morocco) K Alami	4	4
(Japan) S Matsuoka	6	6
(France) O Delaître	2	3
16	(Switzerland) J Hlasek	6	6
9	(Australia) P Rafter	7^{7}	6
(Spain) J F Altur	6^{1}	4
(Argentina) J Frana	2	3
(New Zealand) B Steven	6	6
Q	(United States) D Witt	6	7
(United States) S Bryan	2	5

Second round
1	(United States) P Sampras	6	2	6
(Sweden) J Björkman	4	6	3
(Japan) S Matsuoka	6	6
16	(Switzerland) J Hlasek	2	4
9	(Australia) P Rafter	6	4	3
(New Zealand) B Steven	2	6	6
Q	(United States) D Witt	3	4
8	(South Africa) W Ferreira	6	6

Third round
1	(United States) P Sampras	7^{7}	6
(Japan) S Matsuoka	6^{2}	2
(New Zealand) B Steven	3	3
8	(South Africa) W Ferreira	6	6

Quarterfinals
1	(United States) P Sampras	6	6
8	(South Africa) W Ferreira	1	4

==== Section 2 ====
First round
(United States) D Wheaton	6	6
Q	(United States) M Joyce	4	4
Q	(Sweden) D Engel	7^{8}	6
(France) S Simian	6^{6}	3
(Sweden) J Apell	6	7^{7}
14	(Australia) M Woodforde	4	6^{5}
12	(United States) R Reneberg	3	5
(Canada) D Nestor	6	7
(Sweden) C Bergström	2	2
(Germany) D Prinosil	6	6
(United Kingdom) J Bates	7	6
(France) G Raoux	5	3

Second round
4	(Croatia) G Ivanišević	6	7
(United States) D Wheaton	4	5
Q	(Sweden) D Engel	6	6^{4}	4
(Sweden) J Apell	3	7^{7}	6
(Canada) D Nestor	6	4	6
(Germany) D Prinosil	1	6	3
(United Kingdom) J Bates	7	7^{10}
6	(Germany) B Becker	5	6^{8}

Third round
4	(Croatia) G Ivanišević	6^{9}	6^{2}
(Sweden) J Apell	7^{11}	7^{7}
(Canada) D Nestor	4	6	4
(United Kingdom) J Bates	6	3	6

Quarterfinals
(Sweden) J Apell	6	7
(United Kingdom) J Bates	3	5

=== Bottom half ===
==== Section 3 ====
First round
WC	(United Kingdom) T Henman	7	7^{7}
Q	(Sweden) P Lundgren	5	6^{4}
(United States) D Flach	3	4
WC	(United Kingdom) C Bailey	6	6
(Canada) G Rusedski	7^{7}	6
11	(Italy) A Gaudenzi	6^{3}	2
13	(Australia) J Stoltenberg	6	6
Q	(Australia) J Eagle	1	1
(United States) A O'Brien	6	6
WC	(United Kingdom) C Wilkinson	3	2
(United States) P McEnroe	5	1
(Australia) B Larkham	7	6

Second round
5	(United States) T Martin	6	6
WC	(United Kingdom) T Henman	4	4
WC	(United Kingdom) C Bailey	4	7^{7}	3
(Canada) G Rusedski	6	6^{5}	6
13	(Australia) J Stoltenberg	6^{7}	6	6
(United States) A O'Brien	7^{9}	2	2
(Australia) B Larkham	2	4
3	(Sweden) S Edberg	6	6

Third round
5	(United States) T Martin	4	6	6
(Canada) G Rusedski	6	3	4
13	(Australia) J Stoltenberg	6	3	4
3	(Sweden) S Edberg	1	6	6

Quarterfinals
5	(United States) T Martin	6	6
3	(Sweden) S Edberg	3	4

==== Section 4 ====
First round
(Australia) T Woodbridge	6	4	0
Q	(South Africa) C van Rensburg	4	6	6
(United Kingdom) M Petchey	6	7
(Venezuela) M Ruah	2	5
(South Africa) M Ondruska	6^{3}	0
10	(United States) M Washington	7^{7}	6
15	(Australia) J Morgan	6	4	6
Q	(Australia) G Doyle	2	6	3
(United States) B Shelton	6	7^{7}
(Sweden) T Nydahl	4	6^{5}
(Zimbabwe) B Black	7	6
WC	(France) G Forget	5	4

Second round
WC/7	(France) C Pioline	7	5	4
Q	(South Africa) C van Rensburg	5	7	6
(United Kingdom) M Petchey	7^{8}	4	1
10	(United States) M Washington	6^{6}	6	6
15	(Australia) J Morgan	6	6
(United States) B Shelton	3	2
(Zimbabwe) B Black	2	3
2	(Germany) M Stich	6	6

Third round
Q	(South Africa) C van Rensburg	2	6	6
10	(United States) M Washington	6	2	4
15	(Australia) J Morgan	7^{8}	6
2	(Germany) M Stich	6^{6}	3

Quarterfinals
Q	(South Africa) C van Rensburg	4	6	6
15	(Australia) J Morgan	6	2	4
