= 1996 Stella Artois Championships =

- Date: 10–16 June
- Edition: 94th
- Category: World Series
- Draw: 56S / 28D
- Prize money: $675,000
- Surface: Grass / outdoor
- Location: London, United Kingdom
- Venue: Queen's Club

Champions

Singles
- (Germany) Boris Becker

Doubles
- (Australia) Todd Woodbridge / (Australia) Mark Woodforde
← 1995 ·	Queen's Club Championships	· 1997 →

The 1996 Stella Artois Championships was a men's tennis tournament played on grass courts at the Queen's Club in London in the United Kingdom and was part of the World Series of the 1996 ATP Tour. It was the 94th edition of the tournament and was held from 10 June through 16 June 1996. Second-seeded Boris Becker won the singles title.

== Finals ==
=== Singles ===
(Germany) Boris Becker defeated (Sweden) Stefan Edberg 6–4, 7–6^{(7–3)}

- It was Becker's 2nd title of the year and the 61st of his career.

=== Doubles ===
(Australia) Todd Woodbridge / (Australia) Mark Woodforde defeated (Canada) Sébastien Lareau / (United States) Alex O'Brien 6–3, 7–6

- It was Woodbridge's 7th title of the year and the 47th of his career. It was Woodforde's 8th title of the year and the 51st of his career.
