= 1996 Marseille Open – Doubles =

Doubles
- 1996 Marseille Open

Final
- Champions: (France) Jean-Philippe Fleurian (France) Guillaume Raoux
- Runners-up: (South Africa) Marius Barnard (Sweden) Peter Nyborg
- Score: 6–3, 6–2

Events
Singles	Doubles
← 1995 ·	Marseille Open	· 1997 →

David Adams and Andrei Olhovskiy were the defending champions but did not compete that year.

Jean-Philippe Fleurian and Guillaume Raoux won in the final 6–3, 6–2 against Marius Barnard and Peter Nyborg.

== Seeds ==
1. (Czech Republic) Cyril Suk / (Czech Republic) Daniel Vacek (quarterfinals)
2. (France) Guy Forget / (Switzerland) Jakob Hlasek (quarterfinals)
3. (Czech Republic) Martin Damm / (Russia) Yevgeny Kafelnikov (first round)
4. (Sweden) Jan Apell / (Sweden) Jonas Björkman (quarterfinals)

== Draw ==
=== Key ===
- Q = Qualifier
- WC = Wild card
- LL = Lucky loser
- Alt = Alternate
- ITF = ITF entry
- PR = Protected ranking
- SR = Special ranking
- SE = Special exempt
- JE = Junior exempt
- JR = Junior Accelerator Programme entrant
- CO = College Accelerator Programme entrant
- NG = Next Gen Accelerator Program entrant
- w/o = Walkover
- r = Retired
- d = Defaulted

First round
1	(Czech Republic) C Suk (Czech Republic) D Vacek	6	6
(United States) B Behrens (Germany) M Sinner	4	4
(South Africa) M Barnard (Sweden) P Nyborg	7	6
(Belgium) L Pimek (South Africa) B Talbot	6	4
4	(Sweden) J Apell (Sweden) J Björkman	6	6	6
WC	(France) H Leconte (France) Y Noah	1	7	2
WC	(France) J Loustalot (France) P Gauthier	4	7	3
(Netherlands) M Oosting (Netherlands) S Schalken	6	5	6
(France) L Barthez (France) G Bastié	6	2	6
(Portugal) J Cunha e Silva (Netherlands) F Wibier	2	6	4
(United Kingdom) T Henman (Netherlands) T Kempers	6	3	7
3	(Czech Republic) M Damm (Russia) Y Kafelnikov	3	6	6
(France) J-P Fleurian (France) G Raoux	6	6
Q	(France) D Courcol (France) S Simian	3	4
(Spain) T Carbonell (Spain) F Roig	6	3	4
2	(France) G Forget (Switzerland) J Hlasek	4	6	6

Quarterfinals
1	(Czech Republic) C Suk (Czech Republic) D Vacek	6	5	1
(South Africa) M Barnard (Sweden) P Nyborg	1	7	6
4	(Sweden) J Apell (Sweden) J Björkman	2	6	6
(Netherlands) M Oosting (Netherlands) S Schalken	6	3	7
(France) L Barthez (France) G Bastié	7	2	7
(United Kingdom) T Henman (Netherlands) T Kempers	6	6	6
(France) J-P Fleurian (France) G Raoux	6	7
2	(France) G Forget (Switzerland) J Hlasek	4	6

Semifinals
(South Africa) M Barnard (Sweden) P Nyborg	4	7	6
(Netherlands) M Oosting (Netherlands) S Schalken	6	6	1
(France) L Barthez (France) G Bastié	3	4
(France) J-P Fleurian (France) G Raoux	6	6

Final
(South Africa) M Barnard (Sweden) P Nyborg	3	2
(France) J-P Fleurian (France) G Raoux	6	6
