= 1996 Marseille Open – Singles =

Singles
- 1996 Marseille Open

Final
- Champion: (France) Guy Forget
- Runner-up: (France) Cédric Pioline
- Score: 7–5, 6–4

Details
- Draw: 32 (4 Q / 3 WC )
- Seeds: 8

Events
Singles	Doubles
← 1995 ·	Open 13	· 1997 →

Boris Becker was the defending champion but did not compete that year.

Unseeded Guy Forget won in the final 7–5, 6–4 against Cédric Pioline.

== Seeds ==
1. (Russia) Yevgeny Kafelnikov (first round)
2. (Spain) Sergi Bruguera (quarterfinals)
3. (Czech Republic) Daniel Vacek (second round)
4. (Sweden) Jonas Björkman (first round)
5. (Czech Republic) Bohdan Ulihrach (second round)
6. (Switzerland) Jakob Hlasek (second round)
7. (France) Cédric Pioline (final)
8. (Netherlands) Sjeng Schalken (second round)

== Draw ==
=== Key ===
- Q = Qualifier
- WC = Wild card
- LL = Lucky loser
- Alt = Alternate
- ITF = ITF entry
- PR = Protected ranking
- SR = Special ranking
- SE = Special exempt
- JE = Junior exempt
- JR = Junior Accelerator Programme entrant
- CO = College Accelerator Programme entrant
- NG = Next Gen Accelerator Program entrant
- w/o = Walkover
- r = Retired
- d = Defaulted

=== Finals ===
Semifinals
(Spain) Tomás Carbonell	3	6^{6}
(France) Guy Forget	6	7^{8}
(Germany) Hendrik Dreekmann	3	6	2
7	(France) Cédric Pioline	6	3	6

Final
(France) Guy Forget	7	6
7	(France) Cédric Pioline	5	4

=== Top half ===
First round
1	(Russia) Y Kafelnikov	4	4
(Czech Republic) C Doseděl	6	6
(Spain) T Carbonell	6	6
(Germany) C-U Steeb	3	1
(Norway) C Ruud	5	6	4
Q	(France) S Simian	7	3	6
WC	(France) H Leconte	4	3
8	(Netherlands) S Schalken	6	6
3	(Czech Republic) D Vacek	3	7	6
Q	(France) O Delaître	6	5	2
(Romania) A Voinea	4	7	7^{7}
Q	(France) G Carraz	6	5	6^{5}
(France) G Forget	4	6	6
WC	(France) Y Noah	6	3	3
(Russia) A Chesnokov	4	2
6	(Switzerland) J Hlasek	6	6

Second round
(Czech Republic) C Doseděl	1	7	6^{6}
(Spain) T Carbonell	6	5	7^{8}
Q	(France) S Simian	4	7^{9}	6
8	(Netherlands) S Schalken	6	6^{7}	4
3	(Czech Republic) D Vacek	7^{7}	3	4
(Romania) A Voinea	6^{3}	6	6
(France) G Forget	6	7^{7}
6	(Switzerland) J Hlasek	3	6^{4}

Quarterfinals
(Spain) T Carbonell	6	7
Q	(France) S Simian	2	5
(Romania) A Voinea	3	6	5
(France) G Forget	6	4	7

Semifinals
(Spain) T Carbonell	3	6^{6}
(France) G Forget	6	7^{8}

=== Bottom half ===
First round
5	(Czech Republic) B Ulihrach	4	7^{7}	7^{8}
Q	(Haiti) R Agénor	6	6^{2}	6^{6}
(Germany) H Dreekmann	6	6
(Germany) M Sinner	3	4
(Spain) F Mantilla	4	2
(Belgium) F Dewulf	6	6
(Spain) C Moyá	6	7^{7}
4	(Sweden) J Björkman	3	6^{5}
7	(France) C Pioline	6	6
(Slovakia) K Kučera	4	4
(Czech Republic) M Damm	4	7	6
(Sweden) J Apell	6	5	0
(United Kingdom) T Henman	7^{7}	6
WC	(France) J-P Fleurian	6^{4}	3
(France) G Raoux	7^{7}	3	6^{3}
2	(Spain) S Bruguera	6^{4}	6	7^{7}

Second round
5	(Czech Republic) B Ulihrach	2	6^{3}
(Germany) H Dreekmann	6	7^{7}
(Belgium) F Dewulf	6	5	6
(Spain) C Moyá	4	7	2
7	(France) C Pioline	6	6
(Czech Republic) M Damm	1	2
(United Kingdom) T Henman	1	6	4
2	(Spain) S Bruguera	6	3	6

Quarterfinals
(Germany) H Dreekmann	7^{7}	4	7^{7}
(Belgium) F Dewulf	6^{4}	6	6^{5}
7	(France) C Pioline	4	6	6
2	(Spain) S Bruguera	6	3	2

Semifinals
(Germany) H Dreekmann	3	6	2
7	(France) C Pioline	6	3	6
