= 1995 Stella Artois Championships – Singles =

Singles
- 1995 Stella Artois Championships

Final
- Champion: (United States) Pete Sampras
- Runner-up: (France) Guy Forget
- Score: 7–6^{(7–3)}, 7–6^{(8–6)}

Details
- Draw: 56
- Seeds: 16

Events
Singles	Doubles
← 1994 ·	Queen's Club Championships	· 1996 →

Todd Martin was the defending champion but lost in the third round to Guy Forget.

Pete Sampras won in the final 7–6^{(7–3)}, 7–6^{(8–6)} against Forget.

== Seeds ==
The top eight seeds received a bye to the second round.

1. (United States) Pete Sampras (champion)
2. (Germany) Boris Becker (semifinals)
3. (Croatia) Goran Ivanišević (quarterfinals)
4. (South Africa) Wayne Ferriera (third round)
5. (United States) Todd Martin (third round)
6. (Switzerland) Marc Rosset (third round)
7. (Sweden) Stefan Edberg (third round)
8. (Sweden) Jonas Björkman (third round)
9. (United States) David Wheaton (first round)
10. (Australia) Jason Stoltenberg (third round)
11. (France) Guy Forget (final)
12. (Australia) Mark Woodforde (first round)
13. (Russia) Alexander Volkov (second round)
14. (Australia) Patrick Rafter (second round)
15. (Argentina) Javier Frana (third round)
16. (Germany) Martin Sinner (first round)

== Draw ==
=== Key ===
- Q = Qualifier
- WC = Wild card
- LL = Lucky loser
- Alt = Alternate
- SE = Special exempt
- PR = Protected ranking
- ITF = ITF entry
- JE = Junior exempt
- w/o = Walkover
- r = Retired
- d = Defaulted
- SR = Special ranking

=== Finals ===
Semifinals
1	(United States) Pete Sampras	6^{4}	6	13
(Germany) Marc-Kevin Goellner	7^{7}	2	11
11	(France) Guy Forget	4	6	6
2	(Germany) Boris Becker	6	3	4

Final
1	(United States) Pete Sampras	7^{7}	7^{8}
11	(France) Guy Forget	6^{3}	6^{6}

=== Top half ===
==== Section 1 ====
First round
(Denmark) K Carlsen	5	2
(United States) J Stark	7	6
(Germany) M Zoecke	4	3
(United Kingdom) J Bates	6	6
WC	(United Kingdom) T Henman	7	6
16	(Germany) M Sinner	5	4
9	(United States) D Wheaton	2	6	1
(United States) J Palmer	6	4	6
Q	(United States) D Flach	2	7^{7}	2
Q	(Australia) S Stolle	6	6^{5}	6
(Australia) J Morgan	6	6
WC	(Australia) S Draper	4	0

Second round
1	(United States) P Sampras	7^{7}	6
(United States) J Stark	6^{4}	3
(United Kingdom) J Bates	6	7^{7}
WC	(United Kingdom) T Henman	4	6^{4}
(United States) J Palmer	3	2
Q	(Australia) S Stolle	6	6
(Australia) J Morgan	4	4
8	(Sweden) J Björkman	6	6

Third round
1	(United States) P Sampras	6	7
(United Kingdom) J Bates	3	5
Q	(Australia) S Stolle	6^{7}	6	6
8	(Sweden) J Björkman	7^{9}	4	4

Quarterfinals
1	(United States) P Sampras	6	6
Q	(Australia) S Stolle	2	3

==== Section 2 ====
First round
(United States) B Shelton	6	6
Q	(United States) B MacPhie	2	4
Q	(Canada) G Connell	4	2
(United States) D Rostagno	6	6
Q	(France) P Pech	6	1	1
13	(Russia) A Volkov	4	6	6
12	(Australia) M Woodforde	6^{4}	6	8
(Germany) M-K Goellner	7^{7}	4	10
(Denmark) F Fetterlein	3	2
(Italy) G Pozzi	6	6
(United States) M Joyce	5	1
(Australia) T Woodbridge	7	6

Second round
4	(South Africa) W Ferreira	6	6
(United States) B Shelton	2	4
(United States) D Rostagno	7	6
13	(Russia) A Volkov	5	2
(Germany) M-K Goellner	6	6
(Italy) G Pozzi	3	2
(Australia) T Woodbridge	6^{2}	7^{7}	2
6	(Switzerland) M Rosset	7^{7}	6^{4}	6

Third round
4	(South Africa) W Ferreira	5	7^{7}	8
(United States) D Rostagno	7	6^{2}	10
(Germany) M-K Goellner	6	6^{2}	6
6	(Switzerland) M Rosset	4	7^{7}	3

Quarterfinals
(United States) D Rostagno	5	4
(Germany) M-K Goellner	7	6

=== Bottom half ===
==== Section 3 ====
First round
(Canada) S Lareau	2	3
(Sweden) J Apell	6	6
Q	(United States) P McEnroe	1	3
(Germany) D Prinosil	6	6
(Zimbabwe) B Black	4	2
11	(France) G Forget	6	6
14	(Australia) P Rafter	6	6
(United States) V Spadea	3	1
(Czech Republic) P Korda	7^{7}	7
WC	(Australia) P Cash	6^{4}	5
(South Africa) M Ondruska	6	6
(Australia) M Philippoussis	4	3

Second round
5	(United States) T Martin	6	6
(Sweden) J Apell	3	4
(Germany) D Prinosil	6^{5}	5
11	(France) G Forget	7^{7}	7
13	(Australia) P Rafter	7	6^{6}	7
(Czech Republic) P Korda	5	7^{8}	9
(South Africa) M Ondruska	6	3	5
3	(Croatia) G Ivanišević	4	6	7

Third round
5	(United States) T Martin	4	4
11	(France) G Forget	6	6
(Czech Republic) P Korda	3	7^{7}	5
3	(Croatia) G Ivanišević	6	6^{5}	7

Quarterfinals
11	(France) G Forget	6	7^{7}
3	(Croatia) G Ivanišević	3	6^{3}

==== Section 4 ====
First round
(France) A Boetsch	6	6
(Germany) A Mronz	4	2
(United Kingdom) G Rusedski	4	6	3
(United Kingdom) M Petchey	6	1	6
(Switzerland) J Hlasek	4	2
10	(Australia) J Stoltenberg	6	6
15	(Argentina) J Frana	6	6
(Australia) M Tebbutt	1	3
(United States) T Ho	6	6
WC	(United Kingdom) C Wilkinson	4	0
Q	(United Kingdom) D Sapsford	6	6
WC	(United Kingdom) A Richardson	2	4

Second round
7	(Sweden) S Edberg	7	6
(France) A Boetsch	5	3
(United Kingdom) M Petchey	3	2
10	(Australia) J Stoltenberg	6	6
15	(Argentina) J Frana	6	6
(United States) T Ho	1	2
Q	(United Kingdom) D Sapsford	1	1
2	(Germany) B Becker	6	6

Third round
7	(Sweden) S Edberg	3	6	4
10	(Australia) J Stoltenberg	6	0	6
15	(Argentina) J Frana	4	2
2	(Germany) B Becker	6	6

Quarterfinals
10	(Australia) J Stoltenberg	4	1
2	(Germany) B Becker	6	6
