= 1995 Open 13 – Singles =

Singles
- 1995 Open 13

Final
- Champion: (Germany) Boris Becker
- Runner-up: (Czech Republic) Daniel Vacek
- Score: 6–7^{(2–7)}, 6–4, 7–5

Details
- Draw: (4 Q / 2 WC )
- Seeds: 8

Events
Singles	Doubles
← 1994 ·	Open 13	· 1996 →

Boris Becker defeated Daniel Vacek 6–7^{(2–7)}, 6–4, 7–5 to win the 1995 Open 13 singles competition. Marc Rosset was the champion but did not defend his title.

== Seeds ==
1. (Germany) Boris Becker (champion)
2. (Russia) Yevgeny Kafelnikov (quarterfinals)
3. (Czech Republic) Slava Doseděl (second round)
4. (France) Olivier Delaître (semifinals)
5. (France) Fabrice Santoro (first round)
6. (Slovakia) Karol Kučera (quarterfinals)
7. (Czech Republic) Daniel Vacek (final)
8. (Germany) Hendrik Dreekmann (first round)

== Draw ==
=== Key ===
- Q = Qualifier
- WC = Wild card
- LL = Lucky loser
- Alt = Alternate
- SE = Special exempt
- PR = Protected ranking
- ITF = ITF entry
- JE = Junior exempt
- w/o = Walkover
- r = Retired
- d = Defaulted
- SR = Special ranking

=== Finals ===
Semifinals
1	(Germany) Boris Becker	6	6
4	(France) Olivier Delaître	4	2
(France) Lionel Roux	1	5
7	(Czech Republic) Daniel Vacek	6	7

Final
1	(Germany) Boris Becker	6^{2}	6	7
7	(Czech Republic) Daniel Vacek	7^{7}	4	5

=== Top half ===
First round
1	(Germany) B Becker	6	6
Q	(Spain) J A Viloca	2	4
(Netherlands) J Siemerink	4	4
(France) H Leconte	6	6
LL	(Romania) A Voinea	4	1
(Germany) C Steeb	6	6
(Germany) J Renzenbrink	7^{7}	7^{7}
8	(Germany) H Dreekmann	6^{2}	6^{4}
4	(France) O Delaître	7^{8}	6
(France) G Raoux	6^{6}	3
(Germany) A Mronz	6	1	6
Q	(France) P Gauthier	3	6	3
(Czech Republic) D Rikl	2	7^{7}	6
WC	(France) T Guardiola	6	6^{5}	4
Q	(Sweden) M Stadling	6	4	6
WC/5	(France) F Santoro	4	6	4

Second round
1	(Germany) B Becker	6	6
(France) H Leconte	0	4
(Germany) C Steeb	7	6^{9}	4
(Germany) J Renzenbrink	5	7^{11}	6
4	(France) O Delaître	3	6	7^{7}
(Germany) A Mronz	6	3	6^{3}
(Czech Republic) D Rikl	6	6
Q	(Sweden) M Stadling	4	2

Quarterfinals
1	(Germany) B Becker	7^{7}	6^{11}	6
(Germany) J Renzenbrink	6^{1}	7^{13}	2
4	(France) O Delaître	6	6
(Czech Republic) D Rikl	2	2

Semifinals
1	(Germany) B Becker	6	6
4	(France) O Delaître	4	2

=== Bottom half ===
First round
6	(Slovakia) K Kučera	6	6
(Italy) C Caratti	1	2
(Italy) G Pozzi	7	6
(Spain) E Sánchez	5	3
(Russia) A Olhovskiy	3	2
(France) L Roux	6	6
(France) J Fleurian	6^{8}	0
3	(Czech Republic) S Doseděl	7^{10}	6
7	(Czech Republic) D Vacek	2	7^{7}	7^{7}
(Czech Republic) M Damm	6	6^{4}	6^{4}
Q	(Kenya) P Wekesa	7^{10}	6
(Morocco) K Alami	6^{8}	3
(Sweden) L Jonsson	5	2
(Switzerland) J Hlasek	7	6
(Denmark) K Carlsen	5	3
2	(Russia) Y Kafelnikov	7	6

Second round
6	(Slovakia) K Kučera	6	6
(Italy) G Pozzi	3	4
(France) L Roux	7	6
3	(Czech Republic) S Doseděl	5	3
7	(Czech Republic) D Vacek	6	6
Q	(Kenya) P Wekesa	4	4
(Switzerland) J Hlasek	4	4
2	(Russia) Y Kafelnikov	6	6

Quarterfinals
6	(Slovakia) K Kučera	6	1	2
(France) L Roux	3	6	6
7	(Czech Republic) D Vacek	7	7^{7}
2	(Russia) Y Kafelnikov	5	6^{4}

Semifinals
(France) L Roux	1	5
7	(Czech Republic) D Vacek	6	7
