= 1997 Stella Artois Championships =

- Date: 9–15 June
- Edition: 95th
- Category: World Series
- Draw: 56S / 28D
- Prize money: $675,000
- Surface: Grass / outdoor
- Location: London, United Kingdom
- Venue: Queen's Club

Champions

Singles
- (Australia) Mark Philippoussis

Doubles
- (Australia) Mark Philippoussis / (Australia) Patrick Rafter
← 1996 ·	Queen's Club Championships	· 1998 →

The 1997 Stella Artois Championships was a men's tennis tournament played on grass courts at the Queen's Club in London in the United Kingdom and was part of the World Series of the 1997 ATP Tour. It was the 95th edition of the tournament and was held from 9 June through 15 June 1997. Mark Philippoussis won the singles title.

== Finals ==
=== Singles ===
(Australia) Mark Philippoussis defeated (Croatia) Goran Ivanišević 7–5, 6–3

- It was Philippoussis' 3rd title of the year and the 6th of his career.

=== Doubles ===
(Australia) Mark Philippoussis / (Australia) Patrick Rafter defeated (Australia) Sandon Stolle / (Czech Republic) Cyril Suk 6–2, 4–6, 7–5

- It was Philippoussis' 4th title of the year and the 7th of his career. It was Rafter's 2nd title of the year and the 6th of his career.
