= 1996 Stella Artois Championships – Doubles =

Doubles
- 1996 Stella Artois Championships

Final
- Champions: (Australia) Todd Woodbridge (Australia) Mark Woodforde
- Runners-up: (Canada) Sébastien Lareau (United States) Alex O'Brien
- Score: 6–3, 7–6

Details
- Draw: 28
- Seeds: 8

Events
Singles	Doubles
← 1995 ·	Queen's Club Championships	· 1997 →

Todd Martin and Pete Sampras were the defending champions but only Martin competed that year with Scott Davis.

Davis and Martin lost in the first round to Stefan Edberg and Petr Korda.

Todd Woodbridge and Mark Woodforde won in the final 6–3, 7–6 against Sébastien Lareau and Alex O'Brien.

== Seeds ==
The top four seeded teams received byes into the second round.

1. (Australia) Todd Woodbridge / (Australia) Mark Woodforde (champions)
2. (United States) Patrick Galbraith / (Russia) Andrei Olhovskiy (quarterfinals)
3. (Canada) Sébastien Lareau / (United States) Alex O'Brien (final)
4. (South Africa) Ellis Ferreira / (Australia) Patrick Rafter (semifinals)
5. (Sweden) Stefan Edberg / (Czech Republic) Petr Korda (second round)
6. (France) Guy Forget / (France) Guillaume Raoux (first round)
7. (Germany) Marc-Kevin Goellner / (Czech Republic) Daniel Vacek (first round)
8. (United States) Kent Kinnear / (United States) Dave Randall (quarterfinals)

== Draw ==
=== Key ===
- Q = Qualifier
- WC = Wild card
- LL = Lucky loser
- Alt = Alternate
- SE = Special exempt
- PR = Protected ranking
- ITF = ITF entry
- JE = Junior exempt
- w/o = Walkover
- r = Retired
- d = Defaulted
- SR = Special ranking

=== Finals ===
Semifinals
1	(Australia) Todd Woodbridge (Australia) Mark Woodforde	6	7
4	(South Africa) Ellis Ferreira (Australia) Patrick Rafter	4	6
3	(Canada) Sébastien Lareau (United States) Alex O'Brien	6	6
2	(South Africa) Marius Barnard (United States) Greg Van Emburgh	2	2

Final
1	(Australia) Todd Woodbridge (Australia) Mark Woodforde	6	7
3	(Canada) Sébastien Lareau (United States) Alex O'Brien	3	6

=== Top half ===
First round
(Italy) A Gaudenzi (Croatia) G Ivanišević	7	6	7
(United States) J Palmer (United States) J Stark	6	7	6
(United States) M Keil (United States) M Lucena	6	6
Q	(Germany) P Baur (United States) V Spadea	3	1
(United States) K Flach (United States) D Wheaton	3	6
8	(United States) K Kinnear (United States) D Randall	6	7
(Argentina) J Frana (The Bahamas) M Knowles	6	6
(Czech Republic) M Damm (Italy) D Nargiso	2	4
(United States) B MacPhie (Australia) M Tebbutt	4	4
(United States) R Leach (South Africa) G Muller	6	6
(United States) S Davis (United States) T Martin	2	5
5	(Sweden) S Edberg (Czech Republic) P Korda	6	7

Second round
1	(Australia) T Woodbridge (Australia) M Woodforde	7	6
(Italy) A Gaudenzi (Croatia) G Ivanišević	6	4
(United States) M Keil (United States) M Lucena	6	7	4
8	(United States) K Kinnear (United States) D Randall	7	6	6
4	(South Africa) E Ferreira (Australia) P Rafter	6	7	6
(Argentina) J Frana (The Bahamas) M Knowles	7	6	4
(United States) R Leach (South Africa) G Muller	3	6	6
5	(Sweden) S Edberg (Czech Republic) P Korda	6	3	2

Quarterfinals
1	(Australia) T Woodbridge (Australia) M Woodforde	6	6
8	(United States) K Kinnear (United States) D Randall	4	3
4	(South Africa) E Ferreira (Australia) P Rafter	1	3
(United States) R Leach (South Africa) G Muller	6	6

Semifinals
1	(Australia) T Woodbridge (Australia) M Woodforde	6	7
4	(South Africa) E Ferreira (Australia) P Rafter	4	6

=== Bottom half ===
First round
6	(France) G Forget (France) G Raoux	6	3
WC	(Australia) P Cash (Australia) S Stolle	7	6
WC	(South Africa) W Ferreira (United Kingdom) T Henman	6	4
WC	(United Kingdom) M Petchey (United Kingdom) G Rusedski	7	6
(Australia) W Arthurs (Australia) A Kratzmann	4	7	5
(United States) L Jensen (United States) M Jensen	6	6	7
7	(Germany) M-K Goellner (Czech Republic) D Vacek	6	4
(South Africa) M Ondruska (Venezuela) N Pereira	7	6
(South Africa) M Barnard (United States) G Van Emburgh	6	4	5
(United Kingdom) N Broad (South Africa) P Norval	4	6	7
Q	(United States) D DiLucia (The Bahamas) R Smith	4	2
(Germany) B Becker (Germany) P Kühnen	6	6

Second round
WC	(Australia) P Cash (Australia) S Stolle	6	7
WC	(United Kingdom) M Petchey (United Kingdom) G Rusedski	2	6
(United States) L Jensen (United States) M Jensen	6	5	1
3	(Canada) S Lareau (United States) A O'Brien	4	7	6
(South Africa) M Ondruska (Venezuela) N Pereira	4	6	5
(South Africa) M Barnard (United States) G Van Emburgh	6	4	7
(Germany) B Becker (Germany) P Kühnen	3	4
2	(United States) P Galbraith (Russia) A Olhovskiy	6	6

Quarterfinals
WC	(Australia) P Cash (Australia) S Stolle	2	7	3
3	(Canada) S Lareau (United States) A O'Brien	6	6	6
(South Africa) M Barnard (United States) G Van Emburgh	6	6
2	(United States) P Galbraith (Russia) A Olhovskiy	2	3

Semifinals
3	(Canada) S Lareau (United States) A O'Brien	6	6
(South Africa) M Barnard (United States) G Van Emburgh	2	2
