= 1994 Stella Artois Championships – Doubles =

Doubles
- 1994 Stella Artois Championships

Final
- Champions: (Sweden) Jan Apell (Sweden) Jonas Björkman
- Runners-up: (Australia) Todd Woodbridge (Australia) Mark Woodforde
- Score: 3–6, 7–6, 6–4

Details
- Draw: 28

Events
Singles	Doubles
← 1993 ·	Queen's Club Championships	· 1995 →

Todd Woodbridge and Mark Woodforde were the defending champions but lost in the final 3–6, 7–6, 6–4 against Jan Apell and Jonas Björkman.

== Seeds ==
The top four seeded teams received byes into the second round.

1. (Canada) Grant Connell / (United States) Patrick Galbraith (quarterfinals)
2. (Australia) Todd Woodbridge / (Australia) Mark Woodforde (final)
3. n/a
4. (Zimbabwe) Byron Black / (United States) Scott Melville (quarterfinals)
5. (Sweden) Jan Apell / (Sweden) Jonas Björkman (champions)
6. (United States) Rick Leach / (South Africa) Danie Visser (quarterfinals)
7. (United States) Brad Pearce / (United States) Dave Randall (first round)
8. (South Africa) Marcos Ondruska / (South Africa) Byron Talbot (second round)

== Draw ==
=== Key ===
- Q = Qualifier
- WC = Wild card
- LL = Lucky loser
- Alt = Alternate
- SE = Special exempt
- PR = Protected ranking
- ITF = ITF entry
- JE = Junior exempt
- w/o = Walkover
- r = Retired
- d = Defaulted
- SR = Special ranking

=== Finals ===
Semifinals
(Croatia) Goran Ivanišević (Australia) Patrick Rafter	6	6
5	(Sweden) Jan Apell (Sweden) Jonas Björkman	7	7
(Australia) Darren Cahill (Australia) John Fitzgerald	6	7	12
WC/2	(Australia) Todd Woodbridge (Australia) Mark Woodforde	7	6	14

Final
5	(Sweden) Jan Apell (Sweden) Jonas Björkman	3	7	6
WC/2	(Australia) Todd Woodbridge (Australia) Mark Woodforde	6	6	4

=== Top half ===
First round
(South Africa) L Bale (New Zealand) B Steven	3	6	4
Q	(United Kingdom) B Cowan (United Kingdom) A Richardson	6	1	6
(Croatia) G Ivanišević (Australia) P Rafter	6	6	6
(United Kingdom) J Bates (South Africa) C van Rensburg	4	7	4
(France) G Forget (Switzerland) J Hlasek	3	6	3
8	(South Africa) M Ondruska (South Africa) B Talbot	6	2	6
(United States) F Montana (United States) B Shelton	6	7
WC	(United Kingdom) T Henman (United Kingdom) M Petchey	4	5
(France) O Delaître (France) S Simian	6	4	2
(Venezuela) M Ruah (Australia) L Warder	4	6	6
(Argentina) P Albano (United States) D Flach	1	1
5	(Sweden) J Apell (Sweden) J Björkman	6	6

Second round
1	(Canada) G Connell (United States) P Galbraith	3	6	6
Q	(United Kingdom) B Cowan (United Kingdom) A Richardson	6	3	4
(Croatia) G Ivanišević (Australia) P Rafter	7	3	6
8	(South Africa) M Ondruska (South Africa) B Talbot	6	6	3
4	(Zimbabwe) B Black (United States) S Melville	7	3	6
(United States) F Montana (United States) B Shelton	6	6	3
(Venezuela) M Ruah (Australia) L Warder	6	3
5	(Sweden) J Apell (Sweden) J Björkman	7	6

Quarterfinals
1	(Canada) G Connell (United States) P Galbraith	2	4
(Croatia) G Ivanišević (Australia) P Rafter	6	6
4	(Zimbabwe) B Black (United States) S Melville	6	3
5	(Sweden) J Apell (Sweden) J Björkman	7	6

Semifinals
(Croatia) G Ivanišević (Australia) P Rafter	6	6
5	(Sweden) J Apell (Sweden) J Björkman	7	7

=== Bottom half ===
First round
6	(United States) R Leach (South Africa) D Visser	6	6
WC	(Sweden) S Edberg (United States) P Sampras	4	4
(South Africa) E Ferreira (South Africa) B Haygarth	2	7	4
Q	(United States) T Kronemann (United States) D Witt	6	6	6
(Australia) D Cahill (Australia) J Fitzgerald	6	6
(United States) S Davis (United States) T Martin	3	3
7	(United States) B Pearce (United States) D Randall	3	2
(Australia) A Kratzmann (Australia) M Kratzmann	6	6
(United States) A O'Brien (Australia) S Stolle	7	3	12
(Canada) D Nestor (India) L Paes	5	6	10
(South Africa) J-L de Jager (Zimbabwe) K Ullyett	6	4	6
WC	(Germany) B Becker (Romania) G Trifu	3	6	3

Second round
6	(United States) R Leach (South Africa) D Visser	6	7
Q	(United States) T Kronemann (United States) D Witt	3	6
(Australia) D Cahill (Australia) J Fitzgerald	6	6
LL	(United States) K Kinnear (Italy) L Tieleman	4	3
(Australia) A Kratzmann (Australia) M Kratzmann	6	7
(United States) A O'Brien (Australia) S Stolle	4	5
(South Africa) J-L de Jager (Zimbabwe) K Ullyett	5	7	3
WC/2	(Australia) T Woodbridge (Australia) M Woodforde	7	5	6

Quarterfinals
6	(United States) R Leach (South Africa) D Visser	7	6	4
(Australia) D Cahill (Australia) J Fitzgerald	5	7	6
(Australia) A Kratzmann (Australia) M Kratzmann	2	6
WC/2	(Australia) T Woodbridge (Australia) M Woodforde	6	7

Semifinals
(Australia) D Cahill (Australia) J Fitzgerald	6	7	12
WC/2	(Australia) T Woodbridge (Australia) M Woodforde	7	6	14
