= 1995 Open 13 – Doubles =

Doubles
- 1995 Open 13

Final
- Champions: (South Africa) David Adams (Russia) Andrei Olhovskiy
- Runners-up: (France) Jean-Philippe Fleurian (France) Rodolphe Gilbert
- Score: 6–1, 6–4

Details
- Draw: 16
- Seeds: 4

Events
Singles	Doubles
← 1994 ·	Open 13	· 1996 →

Jan Siemerink and Daniel Vacek were the defending champions, but did not play together this year. Siemerink partnered Martin Damm, losing in the quarterfinals. Vacek partnered Alexander Mronz, losing in the first round.

David Adams and Andrei Olhovskiy won the title, defeating Jean-Philippe Fleurian and Rodolphe Gilbert 6–1, 6–4 in the final.

== Seeds ==
1. (South Africa) David Adams / (Russia) Andrei Olhovskiy (champions)
2. (Switzerland) Jakob Hlasek / (Russia) Yevgeny Kafelnikov (quarterfinals)
3. (Spain) Sergio Casal / (Spain) Emilio Sánchez (quarterfinals)
4. (Netherlands) Tom Nijssen / (Netherlands) Menno Oosting (quarterfinals)

== Draw ==
=== Key ===
- Q = Qualifier
- WC = Wild card
- LL = Lucky loser
- Alt = Alternate
- SE = Special exempt
- PR = Protected ranking
- ITF = ITF entry
- JE = Junior exempt
- w/o = Walkover
- r = Retired
- d = Defaulted
- SR = Special ranking

=== Draw ===
First round
1	(South Africa) D Adams (Russia) A Olhovskiy	6	6
WC	(France) P Gauthier (France) L Roux	4	4
Q	(Latvia) Ģ Dzelde (Kenya) P Wekesa	6	0	5
(Czech Republic) M Damm (Netherlands) J Siemerink	4	6	7
4	(Netherlands) T Nijssen (Netherlands) M Oosting	7	6	6
(Italy) C Brandi (Belgium) L Pimek	5	7	4
(Czech Republic) V Flégl (Netherlands) S Noteboom	7	6
(South Africa) C Ferreira (Australia) J Ireland	5	1
(France) J-P Fleurian (France) R Gilbert	6	6	6
(Germany) A Mronz (Czech Republic) D Vacek	7	3	4
WC	(Iran) M Bahrami (France) F Santoro	6	2
3	(Spain) S Casal (Spain) E Sánchez	7	6
(France) G Raoux (Czech Republic) D Rikl	7	6
WC	(France) J Golmard (France) H Leconte	6	4
(Argentina) J Garat (Italy) F Mordegan	4	0
2	(Switzerland) J Hlasek (Russia) Y Kafelnikov	6	6

Quarterfinals
1	(South Africa) D Adams (Russia) A Olhovskiy	4	6	6
(Czech Republic) M Damm (Netherlands) J Siemerink	6	3	4
4	(Netherlands) T Nijssen (Netherlands) M Oosting	4	7	4
(Czech Republic) V Flégl (Netherlands) S Noteboom	6	5	6
(France) J-P Fleurian (France) R Gilbert	6	6
3	(Spain) S Casal (Spain) E Sánchez	4	2
(France) G Raoux (Czech Republic) D Rikl	6	6	7
2	(Switzerland) J Hlasek (Russia) Y Kafelnikov	7	4	6

Semifinals
1	(South Africa) D Adams (Russia) A Olhovskiy	6	4	6
(Czech Republic) V Flégl (Netherlands) S Noteboom	4	6	3
(France) J-P Fleurian (France) R Gilbert	6	6
(France) G Raoux (Czech Republic) D Rikl	0	4

Final
1	(South Africa) D Adams (Russia) A Olhovskiy	6	6
(France) J-P Fleurian (France) R Gilbert	1	4
