= 1995 Stella Artois Championships – Doubles =

Doubles
- 1995 Stella Artois Championships

Final
- Champions: (United States) Todd Martin (United States) Pete Sampras
- Runners-up: (Sweden) Jan Apell (Sweden) Jonas Björkman
- Score: 7–6, 6–4

Details
- Draw: 28
- Seeds: 8

Events
Singles	Doubles
← 1994 ·	Queen's Club Championships	· 1996 →

Jan Apell and Jonas Björkman were the defending champions but lost in the final 7–6, 6–4 against Todd Martin and Pete Sampras.

== Seeds ==
The top four seeded teams received byes into the second round.

1. (Australia) Todd Woodbridge / (Australia) Mark Woodforde (semifinals)
2. (Canada) Grant Connell / (United States) Patrick Galbraith (semifinals)
3. (Zimbabwe) Byron Black / (United States) Jonathan Stark (second round)
4. (Sweden) Jan Apell / (Sweden) Jonas Björkman (final)
5. (United States) Patrick McEnroe / (United States) Jared Palmer (quarterfinals)
6. (United States) Trevor Kronemann / (Australia) David Macpherson (quarterfinals)
7. (The Bahamas) Mark Knowles / (Canada) Daniel Nestor (first round)
8. (South Africa) Lan Bale / (South Africa) John-Laffnie de Jager (first round)

== Draw ==
=== Key ===
- Q = Qualifier
- WC = Wild card
- LL = Lucky loser
- Alt = Alternate
- SE = Special exempt
- PR = Protected ranking
- ITF = ITF entry
- JE = Junior exempt
- w/o = Walkover
- r = Retired
- d = Defaulted
- SR = Special ranking

=== Finals ===
Semifinals
1	(Australia) Todd Woodbridge (Australia) Mark Woodforde	3	6	10
WC	(United States) Todd Martin (United States) Pete Sampras	6	3	12
4	(Sweden) Jan Apell (Sweden) Jonas Björkman	6	7
2	(Canada) Grant Connell (United States) Patrick Galbraith	4	6

Final
WC	(United States) Todd Martin (United States) Pete Sampras	7	6
4	(Sweden) Jan Apell (Sweden) Jonas Björkman	6	4

=== Top half ===
First round
(South Africa) W Ferreira (Zimbabwe) K Ullyett	6	6
(United States) R Leach (United States) S Melville	4	2
(United States) L Jensen (United States) M Jensen	6	6	4
(Germany) B Becker (France) G Forget	3	7	6
Q	(Germany) M-K Goellner (Germany) D Prinosil	7	6	6
7	(The Bahamas) M Knowles (Canada) D Nestor	6	7	4
(United States) T Ho (United States) B MacPhie	3	6	4
WC	(United States) T Martin (United States) P Sampras	6	3	6
WC	(United Kingdom) J Bates (United Kingdom) T Henman	6	6
(United States) D Randall (United States) G Van Emburgh	4	2
(South Africa) B Haygarth (Sweden) P Nyborg	6	5
6	(United States) T Kronemann (Australia) D Macpherson	7	7

Second round
1	(Australia) T Woodbridge (Australia) M Woodforde	6	7	11
(South Africa) W Ferreira (Zimbabwe) K Ullyett	7	5	9
(Germany) B Becker (France) G Forget	7	5	4
Q	(Germany) M-K Goellner (Germany) D Prinosil	6	7	6
3	(Zimbabwe) B Black (United States) J Stark	4	6	3
WC	(United States) T Martin (United States) P Sampras	6	3	6
WC	(United Kingdom) J Bates (United Kingdom) T Henman	6	4
6	(United States) T Kronemann (Australia) D Macpherson	7	6

Quarterfinals
1	(Australia) T Woodbridge (Australia) M Woodforde	6	6
Q	(Germany) M-K Goellner (Germany) D Prinosil	4	2
WC	(United States) T Martin (United States) P Sampras	6	6
6	(United States) T Kronemann (Australia) D Macpherson	3	4

Semifinals
1	(Australia) T Woodbridge (Australia) M Woodforde	3	6	10
WC	(United States) T Martin (United States) P Sampras	6	3	12

=== Bottom half ===
First round
5	(United States) P McEnroe (United States) J Palmer	6	7
(Switzerland) J Hlasek (Germany) M Sinner	3	5
(South Africa) G Muller (Czech Republic) C Suk	7	4	4
(Austria) A Antonitsch (United Kingdom) G Rusedski	6	6	6
Q	(France) A Boetsch (Switzerland) M Rosset	3	4
(United States) S Davis (Australia) S Stolle	6	6
8	(South Africa) L Bale (South Africa) J-L de Jager	1	5
WC	(Sweden) S Edberg (Czech Republic) P Korda	6	7
(Australia) W Arthurs (United Kingdom) N Broad	6	6
(South Africa) E Ferreira (Australia) A Florent	3	4
(Croatia) G Ivanišević (Australia) P Rafter	6	3
WC	(United States) K Flach (United States) R Seguso	7	6

Second round
5	(United States) P McEnroe (United States) J Palmer	7	6
(Austria) A Antonitsch (United Kingdom) G Rusedski	6	4
(United States) S Davis (Australia) S Stolle	4	6
4	(Sweden) J Apell (Sweden) J Björkman	6	7
WC	(Sweden) S Edberg (Czech Republic) P Korda	6	4	4
(Australia) W Arthurs (United Kingdom) N Broad	3	6	6
WC	(United States) K Flach (United States) R Seguso	6	1
2	(Canada) G Connell (United States) P Galbraith	7	6

Quarterfinals
5	(United States) P McEnroe (United States) J Palmer	4	2
4	(Sweden) J Apell (Sweden) J Björkman	6	6
(Australia) W Arthurs (United Kingdom) N Broad	4	3
2	(Canada) G Connell (United States) P Galbraith	6	6

Semifinals
4	(Sweden) J Apell (Sweden) J Björkman	6	7
2	(Canada) G Connell (United States) P Galbraith	4	6
