= 1997 Stella Artois Championships – Doubles =

Doubles
- 1997 Stella Artois Championships

Final
- Champions: (Australia) Mark Philippoussis (Australia) Patrick Rafter
- Runners-up: (Australia) Sandon Stolle (Czech Republic) Cyril Suk
- Score: 6–2, 4–6, 7–5

Details
- Draw: 28

Events
Singles	Doubles
← 1996 ·	Queen's Club Championships	· 1998 →

Todd Woodbridge and Mark Woodforde were the defending champions but lost in the semifinals to Mark Philippoussis and Patrick Rafter.

Philippoussis and Rafter won in the final 6–2, 4–6, 7–5 against Sandon Stolle and Cyril Suk.

== Seeds ==
The top four seeded teams received byes into the second round.

1. (Australia) Todd Woodbridge / (Australia) Mark Woodforde (semifinals)
2. (The Bahamas) Mark Knowles / (Canada) Daniel Nestor (second round)
3. (Canada) Sébastien Lareau / (United States) Alex O'Brien (semifinals)
4. (South Africa) Ellis Ferreira / (United States) Patrick Galbraith (second round)
5. (United States) Rick Leach / (United States) Jonathan Stark (quarterfinals)
6. (Australia) Mark Philippoussis / (Australia) Patrick Rafter (champions)
7. (Australia) Sandon Stolle / (Czech Republic) Cyril Suk (final)
8. (United Kingdom) Neil Broad / (South Africa) Piet Norval (quarterfinals)

== Draw ==
=== Key ===
- Q = Qualifier
- WC = Wild card
- LL = Lucky loser
- Alt = Alternate
- SE = Special exempt
- PR = Protected ranking
- ITF = ITF entry
- JE = Junior exempt
- w/o = Walkover
- r = Retired
- d = Defaulted
- SR = Special ranking

=== Finals ===
Semifinals
1	(Australia) Todd Woodbridge (Australia) Mark Woodforde	3	6	3
6	(Australia) Mark Philippoussis (Australia) Patrick Rafter	7	3	6
3	(Canada) Sébastien Lareau (United States) Alex O'Brien	3	6
7	(Australia) Sandon Stolle (Czech Republic) Cyril Suk	6	7

Final
6	(Australia) Mark Philippoussis (Australia) Patrick Rafter	6	4	7
7	(Australia) Sandon Stolle (Czech Republic) Cyril Suk	2	6	5

=== Top half ===
First round
(India) M Bhupathi (India) L Paes	6	6
(Sweden) J Björkman (Netherlands) J Siemerink	4	4
(Russia) A Olhovskiy (New Zealand) B Steven	6	6
(Canada) G Connell (United States) S Davis	3	4
(France) O Delaître (France) G Raoux	5	4
8	(United Kingdom) N Broad (South Africa) P Norval	7	6
(North Macedonia) A Kitinov (Portugal) N Marques	3	4
WC	(United Kingdom) T Henman (United States) P Sampras	6	6
(Netherlands) S Groen (Germany) J Knippschild	6	4
(Belarus) M Mirnyi (Zimbabwe) K Ullyett	7	6
(United States) B MacPhie (South Africa) G Muller	5	6
6	(Australia) M Philippoussis (Australia) P Rafter	7	7

Second round
1	(Australia) T Woodbridge (Australia) M Woodforde	6	6
(India) M Bhupathi (India) L Paes	3	3
(Russia) A Olhovskiy (New Zealand) B Steven	0^{r}
8	(United Kingdom) N Broad (South Africa) P Norval	1
4	(South Africa) E Ferreira (United States) P Galbraith	6	6	1
WC	(United Kingdom) T Henman (United States) P Sampras	7	4	6
(Belarus) M Mirnyi (Zimbabwe) K Ullyett	7	3	5
6	(Australia) M Philippoussis (Australia) P Rafter	6	6	7

Quarterfinals
1	(Australia) T Woodbridge (Australia) M Woodforde	6	6
8	(United Kingdom) N Broad (South Africa) P Norval	3	2
WC	(United Kingdom) T Henman (United States) P Sampras	3	6
6	(Australia) M Philippoussis (Australia) P Rafter	6	7

Semifinals
1	(Australia) T Woodbridge (Australia) M Woodforde	6	6	3
6	(Australia) M Philippoussis (Australia) P Rafter	7	3	6

=== Bottom half ===
First round
5	(United States) R Leach (United States) J Stark	7	7
(South Africa) M Ondruska (South Africa) C van Rensburg	6	6
(Australia) W Arthurs (Australia) A Kratzmann	3	5
(Zimbabwe) B Black (United States) J Gimelstob	6	7
Q	(Germany) P Baur (Venezuela) N Pereira	4	6
WC	(Croatia) S Hiršzon (Croatia) G Ivanišević	6	7
7	(Australia) S Stolle (Czech Republic) C Suk	6	6
WC	(United States) M Chang (Japan) S Matsuoka	3	3
Q	(South Africa) W Black (South Africa) N Godwin	6	7	6
(France) J-P Fleurian (United States) T. J. Middleton	7	5	2
WC	(Germany) M-K Goellner (United Kingdom) G Rusedski	6	6
(Australia) P Kilderry (Australia) M Tebbutt	3	2

Second round
5	(United States) R Leach (United States) J Stark	7	6
(Zimbabwe) B Black (United States) J Gimelstob	6	3
WC	(Croatia) S Hiršzon (Croatia) G Ivanišević	6	3
3	(Canada) S Lareau (United States) A O'Brien	7	6
7	(Australia) S Stolle (Czech Republic) C Suk	6	6
Q	(South Africa) W Black (South Africa) N Godwin	3	2
WC	(Germany) M-K Goellner (United Kingdom) G Rusedski	4	7	7
2	(The Bahamas) M Knowles (Canada) D Nestor	6	6	6

Quarterfinals
5	(United States) R Leach (United States) J Stark	4	5
3	(Canada) S Lareau (United States) A O'Brien	6	7
7	(Australia) S Stolle (Czech Republic) C Suk	7	6
WC	(Germany) M-K Goellner (United Kingdom) G Rusedski	6	3

Semifinals
3	(Canada) S Lareau (United States) A O'Brien	3	6
7	(Australia) S Stolle (Czech Republic) C Suk	6	7
