= 1997 Stella Artois Championships – Singles =

Singles
- 1997 Stella Artois Championships

Final
- Champion: (Australia) Mark Philippoussis
- Runner-up: (Croatia) Goran Ivanišević
- Score: 7–5, 6–3

Details
- Draw: 56 (3WC/7Q)
- Seeds: 16

Events
Singles	Doubles
← 1996 ·	Queen's Club Championships	· 1998 →

Boris Becker was the defending champion but did not compete that year.

Mark Philippoussis won in the final 7–5, 6–3 against Goran Ivanišević.

In one of the semifinals, Goran Ivanišević defeated Greg Rusedski by winning 20–18 in the third set tiebreak. This was considered the longest tiebreak ever played in an ATP tournament and triple tied the record with two Grand Slam matches, Björn Borg against Premjit Lall at the 1973 Wimbledon Championships and Ivanišević himself against Daniel Nestor at the 1993 US Open.

== Seeds ==
The top eight seeds received a bye to the second round.

1. (United States) Pete Sampras (quarterfinals)
2. (United States) Michael Chang (second round)
3. (Croatia) Goran Ivanišević (final)
4. (United Kingdom) Tim Henman (third round)
5. (Switzerland) Marc Rosset (second round)
6. (Australia) Mark Philippoussis (champion)
7. (United States) Jim Courier (third round)
8. (Sweden) Jonas Björkman (semifinals)
9. (Australia) Patrick Rafter (quarterfinals)
10. (Netherlands) Jan Siemerink (first round)
11. (Australia) Todd Woodbridge (second round)
12. (France) Cédric Pioline (second round)
13. (United States) Alex O'Brien (second round)
14. (Australia) Jason Stoltenberg (first round)
15. (Germany) Marc-Kevin Goellner (first round)
16. (United Kingdom) Greg Rusedski (semifinals)

== Draw ==
=== Key ===
- Q = Qualifier
- WC = Wild card
- LL = Lucky loser
- Alt = Alternate
- SE = Special exempt
- PR = Protected ranking
- ITF = ITF entry
- JE = Junior exempt
- w/o = Walkover
- r = Retired
- d = Defaulted
- SR = Special ranking

=== Finals ===
Semifinals
8	(Sweden) Jonas Björkman	6	6^{5}	2
6	(Australia) Mark Philippoussis	2	7^{7}	6
3	(Croatia) Goran Ivanišević	4	6	7^{20}
16	(United Kingdom) Greg Rusedski	6	4	6^{18}

Final
6	(Australia) Mark Philippoussis	7	6
3	(Croatia) Goran Ivanišević	5	3

=== Top half ===
==== Section 1 ====
First round
(France) A Boetsch	6^{1}	6^{3}
(Argentina) J Frana	7^{7}	7^{7}
(Belgium) F Dewulf	7^{8}	4	2
(Canada) D Nestor	6^{6}	6	6
(New Zealand) B Steven	4	6	6
15	(Germany) M-K Goellner	6	1	4
10	(Netherlands) J Siemerink	4	0
(France) S Simian	6	6
Q	(United States) B MacPhie	4	4
(United States) D Flach	6	6
Q	(Mexico) L Herrera	7^{7}	4	7^{7}
(South Africa) M Ondruska	6^{4}	6	6^{2}

Second round
1	(United States) P Sampras	6	6
(Argentina) J Frana	3	2
(Canada) D Nestor	4	4
(New Zealand) B Steven	6	6
(France) S Simian	6^{8}	6	6
(United States) D Flach	7^{10}	4	2
Q	(Mexico) L Herrera	5	5
8	(Sweden) J Björkman	7	7

Third round
1	(United States) P Sampras	w/o
(New Zealand) B Steven
(France) S Simian	4	5
8	(Sweden) J Björkman	6	7

Quarterfinals
1	(United States) P Sampras	6	3	4
8	(Sweden) J Björkman	3	6	6

==== Section 2 ====
First round
WC	(United Kingdom) A Richardson	6^{4}	6	6
(Armenia) S Sargsian	7^{7}	2	4
(France) O Delaître	6	6^{5}	6
(Sweden) H Holm	1	7^{7}	1
(Germany) J Knippschild	7	3	6
14	(Australia) J Stoltenberg	5	6	2
11	(Australia) T Woodbridge	6	6
(Spain) J A Marín	0	3
(Portugal) N Marques	4	6^{4}
(Zimbabwe) B Black	6	7^{7}
(South Africa) N Godwin	5	6^{4}
(United States) J Stark	7	7^{7}

Second round
4	(United Kingdom) T Henman	4	6	6
(United Kingdom) A Richardson	6	3	2
(France) O Delaître	4	6^{5}
(Germany) J Knippschild	6	7^{7}
11	(Australia) T Woodbridge	0	6	3
(Zimbabwe) B Black	6	3	6
(United States) J Stark	6^{10}	6	3
6	(Australia) M Philippoussis	7^{12}	3	6

Third round
4	(United Kingdom) T Henman	6^{5}	3
(Germany) J Knippschild	7^{7}	6
(Zimbabwe) B Black	3	3
6	(Australia) M Philippoussis	6	6

Quarterfinals
(Germany) J Knippschild	2	7^{7}	4
6	(Australia) M Philippoussis	6	6^{4}	6

=== Bottom half ===
==== Section 3 ====
First round
Q	(South Africa) C Haggard	6^{5}	4
(France) J Golmard	7^{7}	6
Q	(France) J-P Fleurian	6	7^{7}
(United States) J Gimelstob	3	6^{5}
(Denmark) K Carlsen	5	6	2
12	(France) C Pioline	7	4	6
13	(United States) A O'Brien	7	4	6
(France) G Raoux	5	6	0
WC	(United Kingdom) M Lee	0	6	6
(Russia) A Olhovskiy	6	4	4
WC	(United Kingdom) M Petchey	1	2
(India) L Paes	6	6

Second round
5	(Switzerland) M Rosset	6^{1}	3
(France) J Golmard	7^{7}	6
Q	(France) J-P Fleurian	7	6
12	(France) C Pioline	5	3
13	(United States) A O'Brien	6	6^{3}	4
WC	(United Kingdom) M Lee	3	7^{7}	6
(India) L Paes	6^{1}	3
3	(Croatia) G Ivanišević	7^{7}	6

Third round
(France) J Golmard	2	6	6
Q	(France) J-P Fleurian	6	1	4
WC	(United Kingdom) M Lee	1	5
3	(Croatia) G Ivanišević	6	7

Quarterfinals
(France) J Golmard	3	6^{9}
3	(Croatia) G Ivanišević	6	7^{11}

==== Section 4 ====
First round
Q	(Philippines) C Mamiit	4	4
Q	(South Africa) D Nainkin	6	6
(Romania) A Pavel	0	2
(Canada) S Lareau	6	6
(Israel) E Ran	5	2
9	(Australia) P Rafter	7	6
16	(United Kingdom) G Rusedski	4	6	6
(Australia) M Woodforde	6	4	3
Q	(Zimbabwe) K Ullyett	3	6	6
(Russia) A Volkov	6	3	3
(Australia) S Draper	6^{4}	6	6
(Australia) S Stolle	7^{7}	4	4

Second round
7	(United States) J Courier	6	6
Q	(South Africa) D Nainkin	3	2
(Canada) S Lareau	3	5
9	(Australia) P Rafter	6	7
16	(United Kingdom) G Rusedski	7	4	7^{9}
Q	(Zimbabwe) K Ullyett	5	6	6^{7}
(Australia) S Draper	6	2	7^{8}
2	(United States) M Chang	3	6	6^{6}

Third round
7	(United States) J Courier	4	6	6
9	(Australia) P Rafter	6	3	3
16	(United Kingdom) G Rusedski	6	6
(Australia) S Draper	3	2

Quarterfinals
9	(Australia) P Rafter	6	5	3
16	(United Kingdom) G Rusedski	4	7	6
