= 1996 Stella Artois Championships – Singles =

Singles
- 1996 Stella Artois Championships

Final
- Champion: (Germany) Boris Becker
- Runner-up: (Sweden) Stefan Edberg
- Score: 6–4, 7–6^{(7–3)}

Details
- Draw: 56
- Seeds: 16

Events
Singles	Doubles
← 1995 ·	Queen's Club Championships	· 1997 →

Pete Sampras was the defending champion but did not compete that year.

Boris Becker won in the final 6–4, 7–6^{(7–3)} against Stefan Edberg.

== Seeds ==
The top eight seeds received a bye to the second round.

1. (Austria) Thomas Muster (semifinals)
2. (Germany) Boris Becker (champion)
3. (Croatia) Goran Ivanišević (third round)
4. (South Africa) Wayne Ferreira (semifinals)
5. (Germany) Michael Stich (quarterfinals)
6. (United States) Todd Martin (quarterfinals)
7. (Australia) Mark Woodforde (quarterfinals)
8. (Italy) Andrea Gaudenzi (second round)
9. (France) Guy Forget (second round)
10. (Czech Republic) Petr Korda (third round)
11. (Czech Republic) Daniel Vacek (first round)
12. (Australia) Jason Stoltenberg (first round)
13. (Australia) Todd Woodbridge (third round)
14. (Sweden) Stefan Edberg (final)
15. (Romania) Adrian Voinea (first round)
16. (Argentina) Javier Frana (first round)

== Draw ==
=== Key ===
- Q = Qualifier
- WC = Wild card
- LL = Lucky loser
- Alt = Alternate
- SE = Special exempt
- PR = Protected ranking
- ITF = ITF entry
- JE = Junior exempt
- w/o = Walkover
- r = Retired
- d = Defaulted
- SR = Special ranking

=== Finals ===
Semifinals
1	(Austria) Thomas Muster	7^{7}	2	3
14	(Sweden) Stefan Edberg	6^{2}	6	6
4	(South Africa) Wayne Ferreira	6^{4}	4
2	(Germany) Boris Becker	7^{7}	6

Final
14	(Sweden) Stefan Edberg	4	6^{3}
2	(Germany) Boris Becker	6	7^{7}

=== Top half ===
==== Section 1 ====
First round
(France) G Raoux	7^{7}	6
(Venezuela) N Pereira	6^{4}	1
(Russia) A Olhovskiy	7^{7}	5	6
(Germany) A Rădulescu	6^{3}	7	4
(United Kingdom) T Henman	6^{7}	6	6
16	(Argentina) J Frana	7^{9}	4	4
10	(Czech Republic) P Korda	6	6^{6}	6
(United States) J Gimelstob	2	7^{8}	2
(Sweden) T Johansson	6	6
(Uzbekistan) O Ogorodov	1	4
(South Africa) M Ondruska	3	5
Q	(United States) B MacPhie	6	7

Second round
1	(Austria) T Muster	6^{5}	7	7^{7}
(France) G Raoux	7^{7}	5	6^{2}
(Russia) A Olhovskiy	6^{4}	6	6
(United Kingdom) T Henman	7^{7}	4	3
10	(Czech Republic) P Korda	6	6
(Sweden) T Johansson	3	4
Q	(United States) B MacPhie	2	6^{1}
8	(Australia) M Woodforde	6	7^{7}

Third round
1	(Austria) T Muster	6	6
(Russia) A Olhovskiy	2	4
10	(Czech Republic) P Korda	1	4
8	(Australia) M Woodforde	6	6

Quarterfinals
1	(Austria) T Muster	1	7	6
8	(Australia) M Woodforde	6	5	3

==== Section 2 ====
First round
(Czech Republic) M Damm	6	3	6
Q	(Australia) W Arthurs	4	6	2
(Australia) S Stolle	6	6
(Russia) A Volkov	2	2
WC	(United Kingdom) D Sapsford	4	3
14	(Sweden) S Edberg	6	6
12	(Australia) J Stoltenberg	2	4
(Canada) S Lareau	6	6
(Belgium) D Norman	7^{7}	0	6^{5}
(Germany) M-K Goellner	6^{2}	6	7^{7}
WC	(United Kingdom) J Bates	1	2
(United States) J Palmer	6	6

Second round
3	(Croatia) G Ivanišević	6	6
(Czech Republic) M Damm	2	2
(Australia) S Stolle	6^{3}	3
14	(Sweden) S Edberg	7^{7}	6
(Canada) S Lareau	6	6
(Germany) M-K Goellner	4	4
(United States) J Palmer	2	3
6	(United States) T Martin	6	6

Third round
3	(Croatia) G Ivanišević	7^{7}	2	6^{4}
14	(Sweden) S Edberg	6^{3}	6	7^{7}
(Canada) S Lareau	3	7^{10}	3
6	(United States) T Martin	6	6^{8}	6

Quarterfinals
14	(Sweden) S Edberg	5	6	6
6	(United States) T Martin	7	4	2

=== Bottom half ===
==== Section 3 ====
First round
(Germany) D Dier	3	6^{2}
(United States) M Joyce	6	7^{7}
(United States) D Wheaton	7^{7}	6
(Australia) M Tebbutt	6^{4}	4
Q	(United States) S Bryan	6	7
11	(Czech Republic) D Vacek	1	5
13	(Australia) T Woodbridge	6	7^{8}
(Germany) P Baur	3	6^{6}
(United Kingdom) G Rusedski	7^{7}	6
Q	(Italy) L Tieleman	6^{4}	3
WC	(United Kingdom) M Lee	1	4
(Australia) S Draper	6	6

Second round
5	(Germany) M Stich	7^{7}	6^{5}	6
(United States) M Joyce	6^{4}	7^{7}	2
(United States) D Wheaton	7	4	6
Q	(United States) S Bryan	5	6	3
13	(Australia) T Woodbridge	6	6
(United Kingdom) G Rusedski	1	4
(Australia) S Draper	6^{6}	4
4	(South Africa) W Ferreira	7^{8}	6

Third round
5	(Germany) M Stich	6	7
(United States) D Wheaton	4	5
13	(Australia) T Woodbridge	4	1	r
4	(South Africa) W Ferreira	6	5

Quarterfinals
5	(Germany) M Stich	7^{7}	3	6^{4}
4	(South Africa) W Ferreira	6^{1}	6	7^{7}

==== Section 4 ====
First round
WC	(United Kingdom) M Petchey	3	6	6^{5}
(Italy) G Pozzi	6	4	7^{7}
(Japan) S Matsuoka	3	3
(Australia) P Rafter	6	6
(United Kingdom) C Wilkinson	2	6^{1}
9	(France) G Forget	6	7^{7}
15	(Romania) A Voinea	4	6	4
Q	(France) D Courcoul	6	4	6
Q	(South Africa) D Nainkin	2	4
(United States) J Stark	6	6
Q	(South Africa) C Haggard	6	2	6
(The Bahamas) M Knowles	4	6	3

Second round
8	(Italy) A Gaudenzi	6	6^{3}	1
(Italy) G Pozzi	4	7^{7}	6
(Australia) P Rafter	6	7^{7}
9	(France) G Forget	2	6^{4}
Q	(France) D Courcol	0	4
(United States) J Stark	6	6
Q	(South Africa) C Haggard	4	2
2	(Germany) B Becker	6	6

Third round
(Italy) G Pozzi	2	1
(Australia) P Rafter	6	6
(United States) J Stark	4	2
2	(Germany) B Becker	6	6

Quarterfinals
(Australia) P Rafter	5	4
2	(Germany) B Becker	7	6
