= 1996 Marseille Open =

- Date: 12–18 February
- Edition: 4th
- Category: World Series
- Draw: 32S / 16D
- Prize money: $514,250
- Surface: Hard / indoor
- Location: Marseille, France
- Venue: Palais des Sports de Marseille

Champions

Singles
- (France) Guy Forget

Doubles
- (France) Jean-Philippe Fleurian / (France) Guillaume Raoux
- Marseille Open

The 1996 Marseille Open was a tennis tournament played on indoor hard courts at the Palais des Sports de Marseille in Marseille in France and was part of the World Series of the 1996 ATP Tour. The tournament ran from 12 February until 18 February 1996. Unseeded Guy Forget on the singles title.

== Finals ==
=== Singles ===
(France) Guy Forget defeated (France) Cédric Pioline 7–5, 6–4

- It was Forget's 1st title of the year and the 35th of his career.

=== Doubles ===
(France) Jean-Philippe Fleurian / (France) Guillaume Raoux defeated (South Africa) Marius Barnard / (Sweden) Peter Nyborg 6–3, 6–2

- It was Fleurian's 1st title of the year and the 1st of his career. It was Raoux's 1st title of the year and the 4th of his career.
