= Mikael Stadling =

Swedish tennis player

- Full name: Mikael Stadling
- Country (sports): Sweden
- Born: 10 August 1966 (age 58); Sundsvall, Sweden
- Height: 1.88 m (6 ft 2 in)
- Plays: Left-handed
- Prize money: $77,893

Singles
- Career record: 1–7
- Highest ranking: No. 246 (8 May 1995)

Grand Slam singles results
- US Open: Q2 (1994)

Doubles
- Career record: 0–2
- Highest ranking: No. 404 (9 November 1992)

Grand Slam doubles results
- Wimbledon: 1R (1993)

Mikael Stadling (born 10 August 1966) is a former professional tennis player from Sweden.

== Biography ==
Stadling comes from Sundsvall in the north of Sweden and is the eldest of three siblings.

Before he played on the professional circuit he attended college in the United States at Texas's Trinity University. As a member of the Trinity Tigers tennis team he earned All-American honours in 1989.

A left-handed player, Stadling competed on the ATP Tour in the 1990s, reaching a best singles ranking of 246 in the world. He qualified for the men's doubles main draw at the 1993 Wimbledon Championships, partnering Alex Rădulescu. His best performance in singles was a win over the fifth seeded Fabrice Santoro at the 1995 Open 13 in Marseille.

== Challenger titles ==
=== Doubles: (1) ===
No.	Year	Tournament	Surface	Partner	Opponents	Score
1.	1997	Portschach, Austria	Clay	(Australia) Jaymon Crabb	(Australia) Dejan Petrovic (Australia) Grant Silcock	7–5, 6–3
