= 1995 Open 13 =

- Date: 6–13 February
- Edition: 3rd
- Category: ATP World Series
- Draw: 32S / 16D
- Prize money: $514,250
- Surface: Carpet / indoor
- Location: Marseille, France

Champions

Singles
- (Germany) Boris Becker

Doubles
- (South Africa) David Adams / (Russia) Andrei Olhovskiy
- Open 13

The 1995 Open 13 was a men's Association of Tennis Professionals tennis tournament held in Marseille, France, and played on indoor carpet courts. The event was part of the World Series of the 1995 ATP Tour. It was the third edition of the tournament and was held from 6 February to 13 February 1995. First-seeded Boris Becker won the singles title.

== Finals ==
=== Singles ===
(Germany) Boris Becker defeated (Czech Republic) Daniel Vacek 6–7^{(2–7)}, 6–4, 7–5

- It was Becker's 1st title of the year and the 43rd of his career.

=== Doubles ===
(South Africa) David Adams / (Russia) Andrei Olhovskiy defeated (France) Jean-Philippe Fleurian / (France) Rodolphe Gilbert 6–1, 6–4

- It was Adams's 1st title of the year and the 7th of his career. It was Olhovskiy's 1st title of the year and the 8th of his career.
