= Queen's Club Championships =

London tennis tournament

Coordinates: 51.488°N 0.212°W

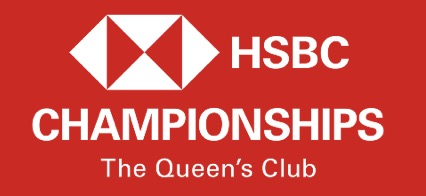

Tournament information
- Event name: HSBC Championships
- Founded: 1886; 140 years ago
- Editions: 122 (2025)
- Location: London; United Kingdom
- Venue: The Queen's Club
- Surface: Grass / outdoors
- Website: queensclub.co.uk

Current champions (2026)
- Men's singles: (Argentina) Francisco Cerundolo
- Women's singles: (Croatia) Donna Vekić
- Men's doubles: (El Salvador) Marcelo Arévalo (Croatia) Mate Pavić
- Women's doubles: (Slovakia) Tereza Mihalíková (United Kingdom) Olivia Nicholls
ATP Tour
- Category: Grand Prix tennis circuit (1970–1989); ATP World Series / ATP International Series / ATP World Tour 250 series (1990–2014); ATP World Tour 500 series (2015–)
- Draw: 32S / 32Q / 24D
- Prize money: €2,583,330 (2026)
WTA Tour
- Category: ILTF Europe Circuit (1913–1970); Grand Prix Circuit (1971–1973); WTA 500 (2025–)
- Draw: 28S / 24Q / 16D
- Prize money: $1,915,000 (2026)

The Queen's Club Championships is an annual professional tennis tournament, held on grass courts at the Queen's Club in West Kensington, London, and known as the "HSBC Championships" (after its title sponsor) since 2025. The event is part of the ATP Tour 500 series on the ATP Tour as well as the WTA 500 series on the WTA Tour (starting in 2025). Queen's is one of the oldest tennis tournaments in the world, and serves as a grass court warm-up for Wimbledon.

Andy Murray won a record five singles titles between 2009 and 2016, and a record six championships in total (including one doubles title in 2019).

== History ==
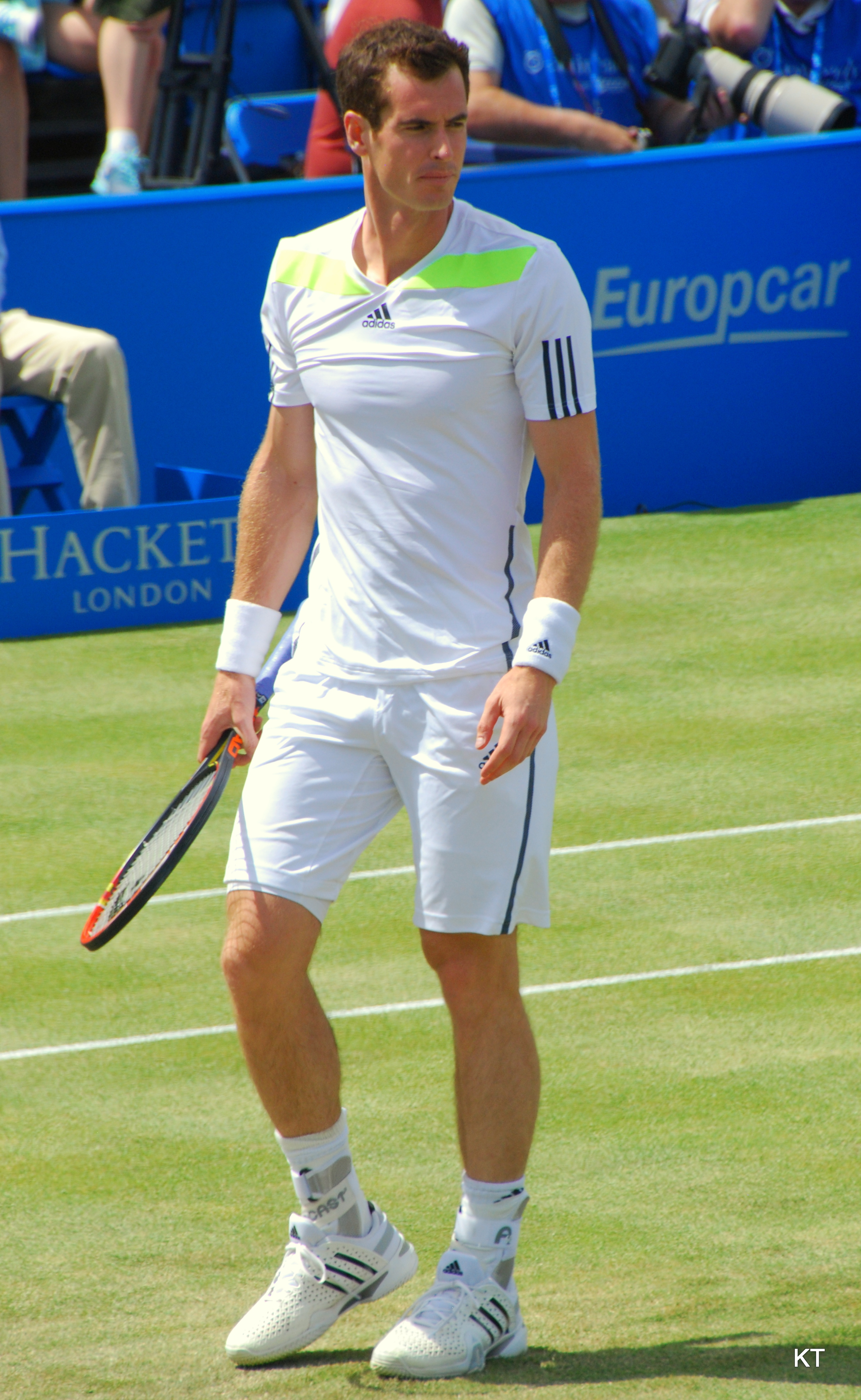
Andy Murray won five titles at The Queens Club, more than any other player

Originally known as the London Athletic Club Tournament or officially London Athletic Club Open Tournament established in 1881 at Stamford Bridge, Fulham. In 1885, the tournament was given the title of the Championship of London then later London Championships, and it was held on outdoor grass courts. In 1890, the tournament moved to its current location, the Queen's Club and consisted of a men's and women's singles event. In 1903, a men's doubles event was added followed in 1905 by the mixed doubles competition. In 1915, the addition of a women's doubles event completed the programme. The two World Wars interrupted the tournament from 1915 to 1918 and 1940 to 1945. Between 1970 and 1989, the Championships were part of the Grand Prix tennis circuit. The women's tournament was discontinued after the 1973 edition and from 1974 until 1976 no men's tournament was held. By this point the tournament was known as the London Grass Court Championships. Since 1977, it has been called The Queen's Club Championships. The event is currently an ATP Tour 500 series tournament on the Association of Tennis Professionals (ATP) Tour and was upgraded from an ATP World Tour 250 series in 2015. The tournament was voted ATP Tournament of the Year for four years consecutively between 2013 and 2014 when it was an ATP 250 tournament, and between 2015 and 2016 when it was an ATP 500 tournament. It then won it again in 2018 and 2019.

During the 2004 singles tournament, Andy Roddick set the then world record for the fastest serve, recorded at 153 mph (246.2 km/h) during a straight-set victory over Thailand's Paradorn Srichaphan in the quarter-finals.

In 2016, Andy Murray won the singles title for a record fifth time. Seven men have won four singles titles; Major Ritchie, Anthony Wilding, Roy Emerson, John McEnroe, Boris Becker, Lleyton Hewitt and Andy Roddick.

After a 50 year absence, women's professional tennis returned to the Queen's Club in 2025, with the club hosting a WTA 500 tournament in the first week of the grass court season, one week in advance of the men's championship.

== Schedule ==
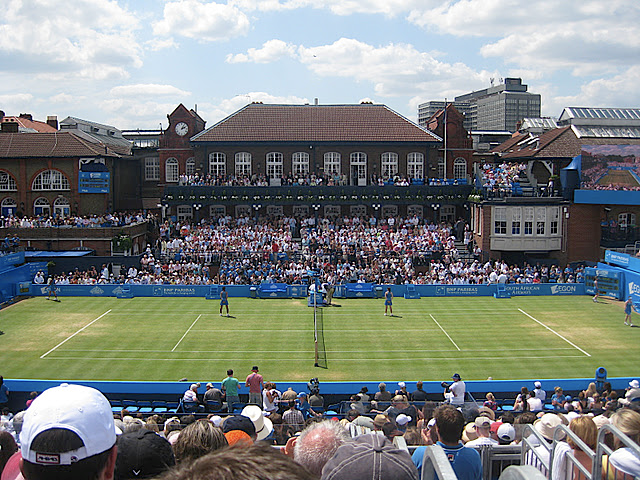
Centre Court during the 2010 Queen's Club Championships

The Queen's Club Championships are held every year in June. They start one week after the clay-court French Open and conclude one week before the start of the grass court Wimbledon Championships, which are held just 4 miles (6 km) away. The equivalent warm-up event for women was the Eastbourne International (until 2025 when it was downgraded to a WTA 250), held one week later.

Up to 2014, the break between the French Open and Wimbledon was just two weeks, and the Queen's Club Championships started the day after the French Open's men's final. This changed when Wimbledon moved back a week to expand the length of the grass court season.

Grass courts are the least common playing surface for top-level events on the ATP World Tour. The 2009 schedule included only four grass court tournaments in the run-up to Wimbledon. They were the Queen's Club Championships, Gerry Weber Open, Eastbourne International, and the Rosmalen Grass Court Championships. An additional tournament is played on grass in Newport, Rhode Island, USA, in the week immediately after Wimbledon.

== Coverage ==
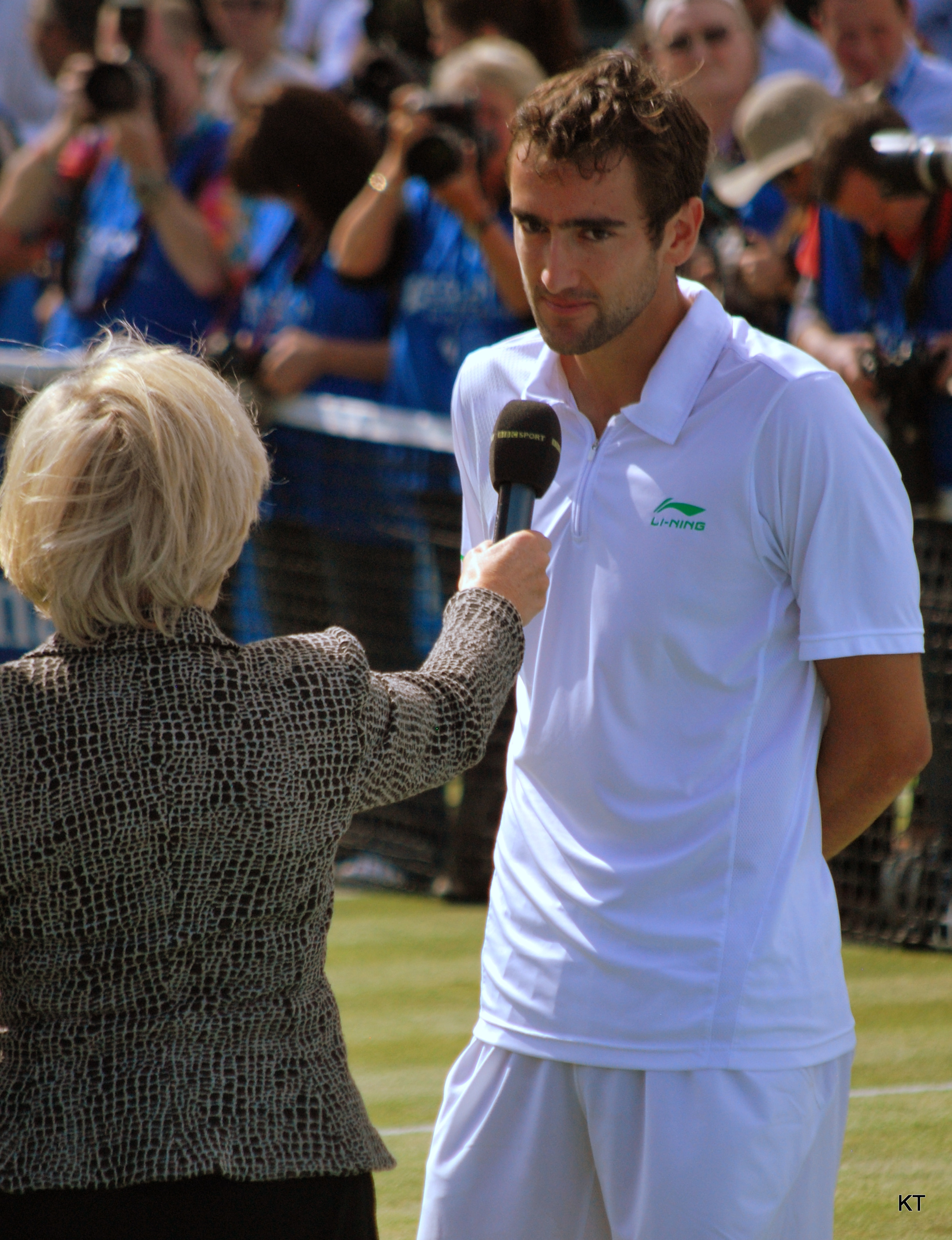
Marin Čilić being interviewed after winning the 2012 Queen's Club Championships

The BBC has covered the tournament since 1979 and in recent years it has shown the tournament in full after originally only broadcasting the final four days of the event. The BBC has a contract in place until 2027. It broadcasts the event mainly on BBC Two as well as on BBC Radio 5 Live and BBC Sport online. It was shown in high-definition for the first time in 2009.

Since 2018, Amazon Prime has also broadcast from The Queen's Club in the UK.

The ball girls for the Championships are provided by Nonsuch High School and St Philomena's Catholic High School for Girls, two schools in the London Borough of Sutton.

== Sponsorship ==
From 1979 until 2008, the tournament was sponsored by Stella Artois, and thus called the Stella Artois Championships. In 2009, the tournament was renamed the Aegon Championships following a comprehensive sponsorship deal between the Lawn Tennis Association (LTA) and Aegon, which also led to renaming of Birmingham and Eastbourne grass court events. In 2018, Fever-Tree began sponsoring the tournament. The online car selling website cinch became the title sponsor of the championships in 2021 and remained so until 2024. On 23 January 2025, the LTA announced HSBC as the new title sponsor of the championships.

== Past finals ==
=== Men's singles ===
Year	Champion	Runner-up	Score
1881	(United Kingdom of Great Britain and Ireland) Frederick. L. Rawson	(United Kingdom of Great Britain and Ireland) George S. Murray-Hill	6–1, 4–6, 6–2, 6–3
1882	(United Kingdom of Great Britain and Ireland) Herbert Lawford	(United Kingdom of Great Britain and Ireland) Otway E. Woodhouse	6–1, 4–6, 6–2, 6–3
1883	(United Kingdom of Great Britain and Ireland) Herbert Lawford	(United Kingdom of Great Britain and Ireland) Edward Lake Williams	6–2, 6–1, 6–0
1884	(United Kingdom of Great Britain and Ireland) Herbert Lawford	(United Kingdom of Great Britain and Ireland) Frederick A. Bowlby	6–3, 6–1, 3–6, 6–2
1885	(United Kingdom of Great Britain and Ireland) Charles H. A. Ross	(United Kingdom of Great Britain and Ireland) Ernest Wool Lewis	3–6, 8–6, 1–6, 6–2, 6–3
1886	(United Kingdom of Great Britain and Ireland) Ernest Wool Lewis	(United Kingdom of Great Britain and Ireland) Harry Grove	6–4, 10–8, 6–4
1887	(United Kingdom of Great Britain and Ireland) Ernest Wool Lewis	(United Kingdom of Great Britain and Ireland) Harry S. Barlow	6–2, 8–6, 6–4
1888	(United Kingdom of Great Britain and Ireland) Ernest Wool Lewis	(United Kingdom of Great Britain and Ireland) Harry S. Barlow	6–0, 6–1, 6–2
1889	(United Kingdom of Great Britain and Ireland) Harry S. Barlow	(United Kingdom of Great Britain and Ireland) Charles Gladstone Eames	5–7, 7–5, 3–6, 6–1, 7–5
1890	(United Kingdom of Great Britain and Ireland) Harry S. Barlow	(United Kingdom of Great Britain and Ireland) Wilfred Baddeley	3–6, 6–8, 6–1, 6–2, 6–2
1891	(United Kingdom of Great Britain and Ireland) Harry S. Barlow	(United Kingdom of Great Britain and Ireland) Joshua Pim	6–4, 2–6, 6–0, 7–5
1892	(United Kingdom of Great Britain and Ireland) Ernest W. Lewis	(United Kingdom of Great Britain and Ireland) Joshua Pim	6–4, 6–4, 3–6, 4–6, 6–1
1893	(United Kingdom of Great Britain and Ireland) Joshua Pim	(United Kingdom of Great Britain and Ireland) Harold Mahony	1–6, 6–1, 6–8, 6–3
1894	(United Kingdom of Great Britain and Ireland) Harold Mahony	(United Kingdom of Great Britain and Ireland) Harry S. Barlow	6–2, 6–3, 6–3
1895	(United Kingdom of Great Britain and Ireland) Harry S. Barlow	(United Kingdom of Great Britain and Ireland) Manliffe Goodbody	6–4, 7–5, 5–7, 5–7, 10–8
1896	(United Kingdom of Great Britain and Ireland) Harold Mahony	(United Kingdom of Great Britain and Ireland) Reginald Doherty	11–9, 6–4, 6–4
1897	(United Kingdom of Great Britain and Ireland) Laurence Doherty	(United Kingdom of Great Britain and Ireland) Major Ritchie	6–2, 6–2, 6–2
1898	(United Kingdom of Great Britain and Ireland) Laurence Doherty	(United Kingdom of Great Britain and Ireland) Harold Mahony	6–3, 6–4, 9–7
1899	(United Kingdom of Great Britain and Ireland) Harold Mahony	(United Kingdom of Great Britain and Ireland) Arthur Gore	8–10, 6–2, 7–5, 6–1
1900	(United Kingdom of Great Britain and Ireland) Arthur Gore	(United Kingdom of Great Britain and Ireland) Arthur W. Lavy	6–0, 6–2, 6–3
1901	(United Kingdom of Great Britain and Ireland) Charles Dixon	(United Kingdom of Great Britain and Ireland) George Greville	6–1, 6–0, 4–6, 6–4
1902	(United Kingdom of Great Britain and Ireland) Major Ritchie	(United Kingdom of Great Britain and Ireland) Charles Simond	6–3, 6–4, 6–0
1903	(United Kingdom of Great Britain and Ireland) George Greville	(United Kingdom of Great Britain and Ireland) Charles Simond	6–1, 6–4, 7–9, 5–7, 6–4
1904	(United Kingdom of Great Britain and Ireland) Major Ritchie	(United Kingdom of Great Britain and Ireland) Harold Mahony	6–3, 6–1, 6–1
1905	(United States) Holcombe Ward	(United States) Beals C. Wright	walkover
1906	(United Kingdom of Great Britain and Ireland) Major Ritchie	(United Kingdom of Great Britain and Ireland) John Flavelle	6–0, 6–1, 7–5
1907	(New Zealand) Anthony Wilding	(United Kingdom of Great Britain and Ireland) Major Ritchie	6–2, 6–1, 6–0
1908	(United Kingdom of Great Britain and Ireland) Kenneth Powell	(United Kingdom of Great Britain and Ireland) Major Ritchie	6–4, 3–3 retired
1909	(United Kingdom of Great Britain and Ireland) Major Ritchie	(New Zealand) Harry Parker	11–13, 6–4, 6–1, 6–0
1910	(New Zealand) Anthony Wilding	(United Kingdom of Great Britain and Ireland) Major Ritchie	6–4, 6–3, 2–0 retired
1911	(New Zealand) Anthony Wilding	(United Kingdom of Great Britain and Ireland) Alfred Beamish	7–5, 6–2, 6–3
1912	(New Zealand) Anthony Wilding	(German Empire) Otto Froitzheim	walkover
1913	(United Kingdom of Great Britain and Ireland) Arthur Lowe	(United States) Wallace F. Johnson	7–5, 6–4, 4–6, 4–6, 6–4
1914	(United Kingdom of Great Britain and Ireland) Arthur Lowe	(United Kingdom of Great Britain and Ireland) Percival Davson	6–2, 7–5, 6–4
1915– 1918	Not held (due to World War I)		
1919	(Australia) Pat O'Hara Wood	(South Africa) Louis Raymond	6–4, 6–0, 2–6, 7–5
1920	(United States) William Johnston	(United States) Bill Tilden	4–6, 6–2, 6–4
1921	(Japan) Zenzo Shimizu	(India) Mohammed Sleem	6–2, 6–0
1922	(United Kingdom of Great Britain and Ireland) Henry Mayes	(United Kingdom of Great Britain and Ireland) Donald Greig	6–8, 6–2, 6–2, 6–1
1923	(United States) Vincent Richards	(India) Sydney M. Jacob	6–2, 6–2
1924	(United Kingdom) Algernon Kingscote	(United Kingdom) Arthur Lowe	3–6, 8–6, 6–3, 6–2
1925	(United Kingdom) Arthur Lowe	(United Kingdom) Henry Mayes	6–2, 9–7
1926	(United Kingdom) Henry Mayes	(United Kingdom) Arthur Lowe	6–3, 6–2
1927	(Canada) Henry Mayes	(United Kingdom) D.M. Evans	6–3, 6–3
1928	(United States) Bill Tilden	(United States) Francis Hunter	6–3, 6–2, 6–1
1930	(United States) Wilmer Allison	(United States) Gregory Mangin	6–4, 8–6
1931	(United Kingdom) John Olliff	(United Kingdom) Edward Avory	3–6, 6–4, 6–2
1932	(Australia) Jack Crawford	(Netherlands) Hendrik Timmer	1–6, 6–3, 6–3, 6–4
1934	(United States) Sidney Wood	(United States) Frank Shields	6–4, 6–3
1936	(United States) Donald Budge	(United States) David Jones	6–4, 6–3
1937	(United States) Donald Budge	(United Kingdom) Henry Austin	6–1, 6–2
1938	(United Kingdom) Henry Austin	(Republic of China (1912–1949)) Kho Sin-Kie	6–2, 6–0
1939	(Germany) Gottfried von Cramm	(India) Ghaus Mohammad	6–1, 6–3
1940– 1945	Not held (due to World War II)		
1946	(Ecuador) Pancho Segura	(Australia) Colin Long	6–4, 7–5
1947	(United States) Bob Falkenburg	(Australia) Colin Long	6–4, 7–5
1949	(United States) Ted Schroeder	(United States) Gardnar Mulloy	8–6, 6–0
1950	(Australia) John Bromwich	(United States) Arthur Larsen	6–2, 6–4
1951	(South Africa) Eric Sturgess	(Australia) Frank Sedgman	6–4, 5–7, 6–2
1952	(Australia) Frank Sedgman	(Australia) Mervyn Rose	10–8, 6–2
1953	(Australia) Lew Hoad	(Australia) Ken Rosewall	8–6, 10–8
1954	(Australia) Lew Hoad	(Australia) Mervyn Rose	8–6, 6–4
1955	(Australia) Ken Rosewall	(Australia) Lew Hoad	6–2, 6–3
1956	(Australia) Neale Fraser	(Australia) Ken Rosewall	7–5, 3–6, 9–7
1957	(Australia) Ashley Cooper	(Australia) Neale Fraser	6–8, 6–2, 6–3
1958	(Australia) Malcolm Anderson	(Australia) Robert Mark	1–6, 11–9, 6–3
1959	(India) Ramanathan Krishnan	(Australia) Neale Fraser	6–3, 6–0
1960	(Spain) Andrés Gimeno	(Australia) Roy Emerson	8–6, 6–3
1961	(Australia) Bob Hewitt	(United States) Chuck McKinley	6–2, 6–3
1962	(Australia) Rod Laver	(Australia) Roy Emerson	6–4, 7–5
1963	(Australia) Roy Emerson	(Australia) Owen Davidson	6–1, 6–2
1964	(Australia) Roy Emerson	(Soviet Union) Toomas Leius	12–10, 6–4
1965	(Australia) Roy Emerson	(United States) Dennis Ralston	walkover
1966	(Australia) Roy Emerson	(Australia) Tony Roche	walkover
1967	(Australia) John Newcombe	(United Kingdom) Roger Taylor	7–5, 6–3
↓ Open Era ↓
1968	(United States) Clark Graebner & (Netherlands) Tom Okker		cancelled – no title awarded
1969	(Australia) Fred Stolle	(Australia) John Newcombe	6–3, 22–20
1970	(Australia) Rod Laver	(Australia) John Newcombe	6–4, 6–3
1971	(United States) Stan Smith	(Australia) John Newcombe	8–6, 6–3
1972	(United States) Jimmy Connors	(United Kingdom) John Paish	6–2, 6–3
1973	(Romania) Ilie Năstase	(United Kingdom) Roger Taylor	10–8, 6–3
1974– 1976	Not held		
1977	(Mexico) Raúl Ramírez	(United Kingdom) Mark Cox	9–7, 7–5
1978	(Australia) Tony Roche	(United States) John McEnroe	8–6, 9–7
1979	(United States) John McEnroe	(Paraguay) Víctor Pecci	6–7, 6–1, 6–1
1980	(United States) John McEnroe	(Australia) Kim Warwick	6–3, 6–1
1981	(United States) John McEnroe	(United States) Brian Gottfried	7–6, 7–5
1982	(United States) Jimmy Connors	(United States) John McEnroe	7–5, 6–3
1983	(United States) Jimmy Connors	(United States) John McEnroe	6–3, 6–3
1984	(United States) John McEnroe	(United States) Leif Shiras	6–1, 3–6, 6–2
1985	(West Germany) Boris Becker	(United States) Johan Kriek	6–2, 6–3
1986	(United States) Tim Mayotte	(United States) Jimmy Connors	6–4, 2–1 (retired)
1987	(West Germany) Boris Becker	(United States) Jimmy Connors	6–7, 6–3, 6–4
1988	(West Germany) Boris Becker	(Sweden) Stefan Edberg	6–1, 3–6, 6–3
1989	(Czechoslovakia) Ivan Lendl	(South Africa) Christo van Rensburg	4–6, 6–3, 6–4
1990	(Czechoslovakia) Ivan Lendl	(West Germany) Boris Becker	6–3, 6–2
1991	(Sweden) Stefan Edberg	(United States) David Wheaton	6–2, 6–3
1992	(South Africa) Wayne Ferreira	(Japan) Shuzo Matsuoka	6–3, 6–4
1993	(Germany) Michael Stich	(South Africa) Wayne Ferreira	6–3, 6–4
1994	(United States) Todd Martin	(United States) Pete Sampras	7–6^{(7–4)}, 7–6^{(7–4)}
1995	(United States) Pete Sampras	(France) Guy Forget	7–6^{(7–3)}, 7–6^{(8–6)}
1996	(Germany) Boris Becker	(Sweden) Stefan Edberg	6–4, 7–6^{(7–3)}
1997	(Australia) Mark Philippoussis	(Croatia) Goran Ivanišević	7–5, 6–3
1998	(Australia) Scott Draper	(Italy) Laurence Tieleman	7–6^{(7–5)}, 6–4
1999	(United States) Pete Sampras	(United Kingdom) Tim Henman	6–7^{(1–7)}, 6–4, 7–6^{(7–4)}
2000	(Australia) Lleyton Hewitt	(United States) Pete Sampras	6–4, 6–4
2001	(Australia) Lleyton Hewitt	(United Kingdom) Tim Henman	7–6^{(7–3)}, 7–6^{(7–3)}
2002	(Australia) Lleyton Hewitt	(United Kingdom) Tim Henman	4–6, 6–1, 6–4
2003	(United States) Andy Roddick	(France) Sébastien Grosjean	6–3, 6–3
2004	(United States) Andy Roddick	(France) Sébastien Grosjean	7–6^{(7–4)}, 6–4
2005	(United States) Andy Roddick	(Croatia) Ivo Karlović	7–6^{(9–7)}, 7–6^{(7–4)}
2006	(Australia) Lleyton Hewitt	(United States) James Blake	6–4, 6–4
2007	(United States) Andy Roddick	(France) Nicolas Mahut	4–6, 7–6^{(9–7)}, 7–6^{(7–2)}
2008	(Spain) Rafael Nadal	(Serbia) Novak Djokovic	7–6^{(8–6)}, 7–5
2009	(United Kingdom) Andy Murray	(United States) James Blake	7–5, 6–4
2010	(United States) Sam Querrey	(United States) Mardy Fish	7–6^{(7–3)}, 7–5
2011	(United Kingdom) Andy Murray	(France) Jo-Wilfried Tsonga	3–6, 7–6^{(7–2)}, 6–4
2012	(Croatia) Marin Čilić	(Argentina) David Nalbandian	6–7^{(3–7)}, 4–3 default
2013	(United Kingdom) Andy Murray	(Croatia) Marin Čilić	5–7, 7–5, 6–3
2014	(Bulgaria) Grigor Dimitrov	(Spain) Feliciano López	6–7^{(8–10)}, 7–6^{(7–1)}, 7–6^{(8–6)}
2015	(United Kingdom) Andy Murray	(South Africa) Kevin Anderson	6–3, 6–4
2016	(United Kingdom) Andy Murray	(Canada) Milos Raonic	6–7^{(5–7)}, 6–4, 6–3
2017	(Spain) Feliciano López	(Croatia) Marin Čilić	4–6, 7–6^{(7–2)}, 7–6^{(10–8)}
2018	(Croatia) Marin Čilić	(Serbia) Novak Djokovic	5–7, 7–6^{(7–4)}, 6–3
2019	(Spain) Feliciano López	(France) Gilles Simon	6–2, 6–7^{(4–7)}, 7–6^{(7–2)}
2020	Not held due to the coronavirus pandemic		
2021	(Italy) Matteo Berrettini	(United Kingdom) Cameron Norrie	6–4, 6–7^{(5–7)}, 6–3
2022	(Italy) Matteo Berrettini	(Serbia) Filip Krajinović	7–5, 6–4
2023	(Spain) Carlos Alcaraz	(Australia) Alex de Minaur	6–4, 6–4
2024	(United States) Tommy Paul	(Italy) Lorenzo Musetti	6–1, 7–6^{(10–8)}
2025	(Spain) Carlos Alcaraz	(Czech Republic) Jiří Lehečka	7–5, 6–7^{(5–7)}, 6–2
2026	(Argentina) Francisco Cerúndolo	(United States) Tommy Paul	6–7^{(4–7)}, 6–4, 6–3

=== Women's singles ===
==== Fulham ====
Year	Champion	Runner-up	Score
1881	(United Kingdom of Great Britain and Ireland) M. Raikes	(United Kingdom of Great Britain and Ireland) Miss Burleigh	5–0, 5–2
1882– 1883	No women's event staged		
1884	(United Kingdom of Great Britain and Ireland) Maud Watson	(United Kingdom of Great Britain and Ireland) Edith Coleridge Cole	6–4, 6–2, 2–6, 6–1
1885	(United Kingdom of Great Britain and Ireland) Maud Watson	(United Kingdom of Great Britain and Ireland) Lilian Watson	6–2, 6–3
1886	(United Kingdom of Great Britain and Ireland) Blanche Bingley Hillyard	(United Kingdom of Great Britain and Ireland) Edith Davies	6–1, 6–1
1887	(United Kingdom of Great Britain and Ireland) Blanche Bingley Hillyard	(United Kingdom of Great Britain and Ireland) B. James	6–4, 6–3
1888	(United Kingdom of Great Britain and Ireland) Blanche Bingley Hillyard	(United Kingdom of Great Britain and Ireland) May Jacks	6–4, 6–3
1889	(United Kingdom of Great Britain and Ireland) May Jacks	(United Kingdom of Great Britain and Ireland) Maud Shackle	6–2, 6–1

==== London ====
Year	Champion	Runner-up	Score
1890	(United Kingdom) May Jacks	(United Kingdom) Maud Shackle	6–2, 6–1
1891	(United Kingdom) Maud Shackle	(United Kingdom) May Jacks	6–2, 4–6, 6–3
1892	(United Kingdom) Maud Shackle	(United Kingdom) Edith Austin	6–2, 6–3
1893	(United Kingdom) Maud Shackle	(United Kingdom) Edith Austin	6–2, 6–1
1894	(United Kingdom) Edith Austin	(United Kingdom) Charlotte Cooper	8–6, 11–9
1895	(United Kingdom) Maud Shackle	(United Kingdom) Edith Austin	6–2, 7–5
1896	(United Kingdom) Charlotte Cooper	(United Kingdom) Agatha Templeman	
1897	(United Kingdom) Charlotte Cooper	(United Kingdom) Edith Austin	2–6, 6–2, 6–2
1898	(United Kingdom) Charlotte Cooper	(United Kingdom) Edith Austin	6–4, 3–6, 8–6
1899	(United Kingdom) Edith Austin	(United Kingdom) Charlotte Cooper	12–10, 2–6, 9–
1900	(United Kingdom) Charlotte Cooper	(United Kingdom) Edith Greville	
1901	(United Kingdom) Edith Austin	(United Kingdom) Ethel Thomson	6–1, 6–1
1902	(United Kingdom) Charlotte Cooper Sterry	(United Kingdom) Ruth Durlacher	
1903	(United Kingdom) Agnes Morton	(United Kingdom) Edith Greville	
1904	(United Kingdom) Agnes Morton	(United Kingdom) Ellen Stawell-Brown	
1905	(United Kingdom) Ethel Thomson	(United Kingdom) Edith Greville	
1906	(United Kingdom) Ethel Thomson	(United Kingdom) Mildred Coles	
1907	(United Kingdom) Violet Pinckney	(United Kingdom) Dorothea Lambert Chambers	2–6, 6–3, 6–4
1908	(United Kingdom) Violet Pinckney	(United Kingdom) Dorothea Lambert Chambers	6–3, 6–2
1909	(United Kingdom) Aurea Edgington	(United Kingdom) Madeline Fisher O'Neill	
1910	(United Kingdom) Gladys Lamplough	(United Kingdom) Edith Johnson	
1911	(United Kingdom) Mildred Coles	(United Kingdom) Agnes Morton	
1912	(United Kingdom) Ethel Larcombe	(United Kingdom) Dorothy Holman	6–1, 6–0
1913	(United Kingdom) Ethel Larcombe	(United Kingdom) Aurea Edgington	
1914	(United Kingdom) Ethel Larcombe	(United Kingdom) Beryl Tulloch	
1915–1918	Not held (due to World War I)		
1919	(United Kingdom) Ethel Larcombe	(United Kingdom) Dorothy Holman	6–4, 8–6
1920	(United Kingdom) Dorothy Holman	(United Kingdom) Ethel Larcombe	w.o.
1921	(United Kingdom) Mabel Clayton	(United Kingdom) Dorothy Holman	
1922	(United Kingdom) Mabel Clayton	(South Africa) W. Keays	
1923	(United States) Elizabeth Ryan	(United Kingdom) Geraldine Beamish	6–2, 1–6, 6–2
1924	(United States) Elizabeth Ryan	(United Kingdom) Doris Covell Craddock	
1925	(United States) Elizabeth Ryan	(United Kingdom) Ermyntrude Harvey	6–0, 6–1
1926	(United Kingdom) Dorothy Kemmis-Betty	(United Kingdom) Eileen Bennett	7–5, 6–2
1927	(United Kingdom) Dorothy Kemmis-Betty	(United Kingdom) Enid Head Broadbridge	6–0, 6–1
1928	(United States) Joan Ridley	(Greece) Hélène Contostavlos	4–6, 6–1, 6–0
1929	(United States) Elizabeth Ryan	(United Kingdom) Elsie Goldsack	6–2, 2–6, 6–2
1930	(United Kingdom) Madge List	(United Kingdom) Margaret McKane Stocks	6–1, 6–3
1931	(United Kingdom) Elsie Goldsack Pittman	(United Kingdom) Kitty McKane Godfree	9–7, 6–4
1932	(United States) Dorothy Andrus	(Poland) Jadwiga Jędrzejowska	1–6, 7–5, 6–4
1933	(United Kingdom) Elsie Goldsack Pittman & (United States) Helen Wills Moody		title shared
1934	(France) Jacqueline Goldschmidt	(United States) Dorothy Andrus	5–7, 6–2, 6–0
1935	(Chile) Anita Lizana & (France) Sylvie Jung Henrotin		title shared
1936	(Poland) Jadwiga Jędrzejowska	(United Kingdom) Susan Noel	6–2, 6–4
1937	(Poland) Jadwiga Jędrzejowska	(United Kingdom) Kay Stammers	6–3, 6–0
1938	(Poland) Jadwiga Jędrzejowska	(Denmark) Hilde Krahwinkel Sperling	6–3, 6–0
1939	(Poland) Jadwiga Jędrzejowska	(Denmark) Hilde Krahwinkel Sperling	6–1, 6–4
1940–1945	Not held (due to World War II)		
1946	(United States) Pauline Betz	(United States) Margaret Osborne	6–8, 6–3, 6–3
1947	(United States) Louise Brough	(United States) Margaret Osborne	6–4, 6–0
1948	(United States) Doris Hart & (United States) Margaret Osborne duPont		title shared
1949	(United States) Louise Brough	(United States) Margaret Osborne duPont	3–6, 6–1, 6–3
1950	(United States) Doris Hart	(United States) Margaret Osborne duPont	4–6, 6–4, 6–4
1951	(United States) Shirley Fry	(United States) Nancy Chaffee	6–3, 8–6
1952	(South Africa) Hazel Redick-Smith	(United Kingdom) Elizabeth Wilford	7–5, 6–1
1953	(United Kingdom) Jean Rinkel-Quertier	(Bermuda) Heather Brewer	6–1, 4–6, 6–2
1954	(United States) Louise Brough	(United States) Shirley Fry	6–1, 6–4
1955	(United States) Louise Brough	(South Africa) Jean Forbes	6–3, 6–1
1956	(United Kingdom) Angela Buxton	(United Kingdom) Patricia Ward	6–4, 6–0
1957	(United States) Mimi Arnold	(Hungary) Zsuzsa Körmöczy	6–1, 5–7, 6–3
1958	(South Africa) Bernice Carr	(United States) Margaret Varner	6–4, 5–7, 8–6
1959	(Mexico) Yola Ramírez	(Belgium) Christiane Mercelis	2–6, 6–1, 6–3
1960	(United Kingdom) Christine Truman	(United States) Karen Hantze Susman	6–4, 6–3
1961	(Australia) Margaret Smith	(United States) Nancy Richey	6–0, 4–6, 6–2
1962	(United Kingdom) Rita Bentley	(United Kingdom) Lorna Cornell	7–5, 7–5
1963	(Australia) Robyn Ebbern	(United Kingdom) Rita Bentley	6–3, 6–3
1964	(Australia) Margaret Smith	(United Kingdom) Ann Haydon-Jones	6–3, 6–2
1965	(South Africa) Annette Van Zyl	(United Kingdom) Christine Truman	6–3, 4–6, 6–4
1966	(France) Françoise Dürr	(Australia) Judy Tegart	4–6, 6–3, 7–5
1967	(United States) Nancy Richey	(Australia) Kerry Melville	2–6, 6–2, 6–4
1968	(United Kingdom) Ann Haydon-Jones & (United States) Nancy Richey		title shared
1969	(United Kingdom) Ann Haydon-Jones	(United Kingdom) Winnie Shaw	6–0, 6–1
1970	(Australia) Margaret Court	(United Kingdom) Winnie Shaw	2–6, 8–6, 6–2
1971	(Australia) Margaret Court	(United States) Billie Jean King	6–3, 3–6, 6–3
1972	(United States) Chris Evert	(Australia) Karen Krantzcke	6–4, 6–0
1973	(Soviet Union) Olga Morozova	(Australia) Evonne Goolagong	6–2, 6–3
1974–2024	No women's event staged		
2025	(Germany) Tatjana Maria	(United States) Amanda Anisimova	6–3, 6–4
2026	(Croatia) Donna Vekić	(United Kingdom) Emma Raducanu	6–0, 7–6^{(8–6)}

=== Men's doubles ===
Since 1969:

(Note: Tournament dates back to 1890)

Year	Champions	Runners-up	Score
1969	(Australia) Owen Davidson (United States) Dennis Ralston	(Sweden) Ove Nils Bengtson (Brazil) Thomaz Koch	8–6, 6–3
↓ Grand Prix circuit ↓
1970	(Netherlands) Tom Okker (United States) Marty Riessen	(United States) Arthur Ashe (United States) Charlie Pasarell	6–4, 6–4
1971	(Netherlands) Tom Okker (United States) Marty Riessen	(United States) Stan Smith (United States) Erik van Dillen	8–6, 4–6, 10–8
1972	(United States) Jim McManus (United States) Jim Osborne	(West Germany) Jürgen Fassbender (West Germany) Karl Meiler	4–6, 6–3, 7–5
1973	(Netherlands) Tom Okker (United States) Marty Riessen	(Australia) Ray Keldie (South Africa) Raymond Moore	6–4, 7–5
1974–1976	Not held		
1977	(India) Anand Amritraj (India) Vijay Amritraj	(United Kingdom) John Lloyd (United Kingdom) David Lloyd	6–1, 6–2
1978	(South Africa) Bob Hewitt (South Africa) Frew McMillan	(United States) Fred McNair (Mexico) Raúl Ramírez	6–2, 7–5
1979	(United States) Tim Gullikson (United States) Tom Gullikson	(United States) Marty Riessen (United States) Sherwood Stewart	6–4, 6–4
1980	(Australia) Rod Frawley (Australia) Geoff Masters	(Australia) Paul McNamee (United States) Sherwood Stewart	6–2, 4–6, 11–9
1981	(United States) Pat DuPré (United States) Brian Teacher	(South Africa) Kevin Curren (United States) Steve Denton	3–6, 7–6, 11–9
1982	(United States) John McEnroe (United States) Peter Rennert	(United States) Victor Amaya (United States) Hank Pfister	7–6, 7–5
1983	(United States) Brian Gottfried (Australia) Paul McNamee	(South Africa) Kevin Curren (United States) Steve Denton	6–4, 6–3
1984	(Australia) Pat Cash (Australia) Paul McNamee	(South Africa) Bernard Mitton (United States) Butch Walts	6–4, 6–3
1985	(United States) Ken Flach (United States) Robert Seguso	(Australia) Pat Cash (Australia) John Fitzgerald	3–6, 6–3, 16–14
1986	(United States) Kevin Curren (France) Guy Forget	(Australia) Darren Cahill (Australia) Mark Kratzmann	6–2, 7–6
1987	(France) Guy Forget (France) Yannick Noah	(United States) Rick Leach (United States) Tim Pawsat	6–4, 6–4
1988	(United States) Ken Flach (United States) Robert Seguso	(South Africa) Pieter Aldrich (South Africa) Danie Visser	6–2, 7–6
1989	(Australia) Darren Cahill (Australia) Mark Kratzmann	(United States) Tim Pawsat (Australia) Laurie Warder	7–6, 6–3
↓ ATP Tour 250 (Note: Known as World Series from 1990 till 1999 and International Series from 2000 till 2008.) ↓
1990	(United Kingdom) Jeremy Bates (United States) Kevin Curren	(France) Henri Leconte (Czechoslovakia) Ivan Lendl	6–2, 7–6
1991	(Australia) Mark Woodforde (Australia) Todd Woodbridge	(Canada) Grant Connell (Canada) Glenn Michibata	6–4, 7–6
1992	(Australia) John Fitzgerald (Sweden) Anders Järryd	(Croatia) Goran Ivanišević (Italy) Diego Nargiso	6–4, 7–6
1993	(Australia) Mark Woodforde (Australia) Todd Woodbridge	(United Kingdom) Neil Broad (South Africa) Gary Muller	6–7, 6–3, 6–4
1994	(Sweden) Jan Apell (Sweden) Jonas Björkman	(Australia) Mark Woodforde (Australia) Todd Woodbridge	3–6, 7–6, 6–4
1995	(United States) Todd Martin (United States) Pete Sampras	(Sweden) Jan Apell (Sweden) Jonas Björkman	7–6, 6–4
1996	(Australia) Mark Woodforde (Australia) Todd Woodbridge	(Canada) Sébastien Lareau (United States) Alex O'Brien	6–3, 7–6
1997	(Australia) Mark Philippoussis (Australia) Patrick Rafter	(Australia) Sandon Stolle (Czech Republic) Cyril Suk	6–2, 4–6, 7–5
1998	(Australia) Mark Woodforde & (Australia) Todd Woodbridge vs (Sweden) Jonas Björkman & (Australia) Patrick Rafter		title shared (rainout)
1999	(Canada) Sébastien Lareau (United States) Alex O'Brien	(Australia) Mark Woodforde (Australia) Todd Woodbridge	6–3, 7–6^{(7–3)}
2000	(Australia) Mark Woodforde (Australia) Todd Woodbridge	(United States) Jonathan Stark (Philippines) Eric Taino	6–7^{(5–7)}, 6–3, 7–6^{(7–1)}
2001	(United States) Bob Bryan (United States) Mike Bryan	(Philippines) Eric Taino (United States) David Wheaton	6–3, 3–6, 6–1
2002	(Zimbabwe) Wayne Black (Zimbabwe) Kevin Ullyett	(India) Mahesh Bhupathi (Belarus) Max Mirnyi	7–5, 6–3
2003	(The Bahamas) Mark Knowles (Canada) Daniel Nestor	(India) Mahesh Bhupathi (Belarus) Max Mirnyi	5–7, 6–4, 7–6^{(7–3)}
2004	(United States) Bob Bryan (United States) Mike Bryan	(The Bahamas) Mark Knowles (Canada) Daniel Nestor	6–4, 6–4
2005	(United States) Bob Bryan (United States) Mike Bryan	(Sweden) Jonas Björkman (Belarus) Max Mirnyi	7–6^{(11–9)}, 7–6^{(7–4)}
2006	(Australia) Paul Hanley (Zimbabwe) Kevin Ullyett	(Sweden) Jonas Björkman (Belarus) Max Mirnyi	6–4, 3–6, [10–8]
2007	(The Bahamas) Mark Knowles (Canada) Daniel Nestor	(United States) Bob Bryan (United States) Mike Bryan	7–6^{(7–4)}, 7–5
2008	(Canada) Daniel Nestor (Serbia) Nenad Zimonjić	(Brazil) Marcelo Melo (Brazil) André Sá	6–4, 7–6^{(7–3)}
2009	(South Africa) Wesley Moodie (Russia) Mikhail Youzhny	(Brazil) Marcelo Melo (Brazil) André Sá	6–4, 4–6, [10–6]
2010	(Serbia) Novak Djokovic (Israel) Jonathan Erlich	(Slovakia) Karol Beck (Czech Republic) David Škoch	6–7^{(6–8)}, 6–2, [10–3]
2011	(United States) Bob Bryan (United States) Mike Bryan	(India) Mahesh Bhupathi (India) Leander Paes	6–7^{(2–7)}, 7–6^{(7–4)}, [10–6]
2012	(Belarus) Max Mirnyi (Canada) Daniel Nestor	(United States) Bob Bryan (United States) Mike Bryan	6–3, 6–4
2013	(United States) Bob Bryan (United States) Mike Bryan	(Austria) Alexander Peya (Brazil) Bruno Soares	4–6, 7–5, [10–3]
2014	(Austria) Alexander Peya (Brazil) Bruno Soares	(United Kingdom) Jamie Murray (Australia) John Peers	4–6, 7–6^{(7–4)}, [10–4]
↓ ATP Tour 500 ↓
2015	(France) Pierre-Hugues Herbert (France) Nicolas Mahut	(Poland) Marcin Matkowski (Serbia) Nenad Zimonjić	6–2, 6–2
2016	(France) Pierre-Hugues Herbert (France) Nicolas Mahut	(Australia) Chris Guccione (Brazil) André Sá	6–3, 7–6^{(7–5)}
2017	(United Kingdom) Jamie Murray (Brazil) Bruno Soares	(France) Julien Benneteau (France) Édouard Roger-Vasselin	6–2, 6–3
2018	(Finland) Henri Kontinen (Australia) John Peers	(United Kingdom) Jamie Murray (Brazil) Bruno Soares	6–4, 6–3
2019	(Spain) Feliciano López (United Kingdom) Andy Murray	(United States) Rajeev Ram (United Kingdom) Joe Salisbury	7–6^{(8–6)}, 5–7, [10–5]
2020	Not held (due to the COVID-19 pandemic)		
2021	(France) Pierre-Hugues Herbert (France) Nicolas Mahut	(United States) Reilly Opelka (Australia) John Peers	6–4, 7–5
2022	(Croatia) Nikola Mektić (Croatia) Mate Pavić	(United Kingdom) Lloyd Glasspool (Finland) Harri Heliövaara	3–6, 7–6^{(7–3)}, [10–6]
2023	(Croatia) Ivan Dodig (United States) Austin Krajicek	(United States) Taylor Fritz (Czech Republic) Jiří Lehečka	6–4, 6–7^{(5–7)}, [10–3]
2024	(United Kingdom) Neal Skupski (New Zealand) Michael Venus	(United States) Taylor Fritz; Karen Khachanov	4–6, 7–6^{(7–5)}, [10–8]
2025	(United Kingdom) Julian Cash (United Kingdom) Lloyd Glasspool	(Croatia) Nikola Mektić (New Zealand) Michael Venus	6–3, 6–7^{(5–7)}, [10–6]
2026	(El Salvador) Marcelo Arévalo (Croatia) Mate Pavić	(United Kingdom) Henry Patten (Finland) Harri Heliövaara	6–2, 6–4

=== Women's doubles ===
Year	Champions	Runners-up	Score
1971	(United States) Rosie Casals (United States) Billie Jean King	(United States) Mary–Ann Curtis (United States) Valerie Ziegenfuss	6–2, 8–6
1972	(United States) Rosie Casals (United States) Billie Jean King	(South Africa) Brenda Kirk (South Africa) Pat Walkden	5–7, 6–0, 6–2
1973	(United States) Rosie Casals (United States) Billie Jean King	(France) Françoise Dürr (Netherlands) Betty Stöve	4–6, 6–3, 7–5
1974–2024	No women's event staged		
2025	(United States) Asia Muhammad (Netherlands) Demi Schuurs	(Kazakhstan) Anna Danilina; Diana Shnaider	7–5, 6–7^{(3–7)}, [10–4]
2026	(Slovakia) Tereza Mihalíková (United Kingdom) Olivia Nicholls	(Canada) Leylah Fernandez (Germany) Laura Siegemund	6–4, 6–7^{(4–7)}, [10–5]

=== Junior championship finals ===
Year	Champion	Runner-up
The Sam Whitbread Cup
1990	(United Kingdom) Andrew Foster	(Germany) Dirk Dier
1991	(India) Leander Paes	(France) Nicolas Kischkewitz
1992	(Australia) Grant Doyle	(Argentina) Lucas Arnold
1993	(South Africa) Neville Godwin	(Czech Republic) David Škoch
1994	(United Kingdom) Jamie Delgado	(Ecuador) Nicolás Lapentti
1995	(Mexico) Alejandro Hernández	(United Kingdom) Jamie Delgado
1996	(Australia) Jaymon Crabb	(United Kingdom) Arvind Parmar
1997	(Chile) Nicolás Massú	(Belgium) Xavier Malisse
The HSBC Junior Invitation Cup
1998	(Argentina) Edgardo Massa	(Taiwan) Cheng Wei-jen
1999	(Finland) Jarkko Nieminen	(United Kingdom) Lee Childs
2000	(United Kingdom) Lee Childs	(Benin) Arnaud Segodo
The David Lloyd Leisure Cup
2001	(Mexico) Santiago González	(United Kingdom) Andrew Banks
The Junior Championship
2002	(United Kingdom) Alex Bogdanović	(Israel) Dudi Sela
2003	(Romania) Florin Mergea	(Australia) Chris Guccione
2006	(United Kingdom) Iain Atkinson	(Brazil) Nicolas Santos
2007	(Belarus) Uladzimir Ignatik	(Portugal) Gastão Elias

== Statistics ==
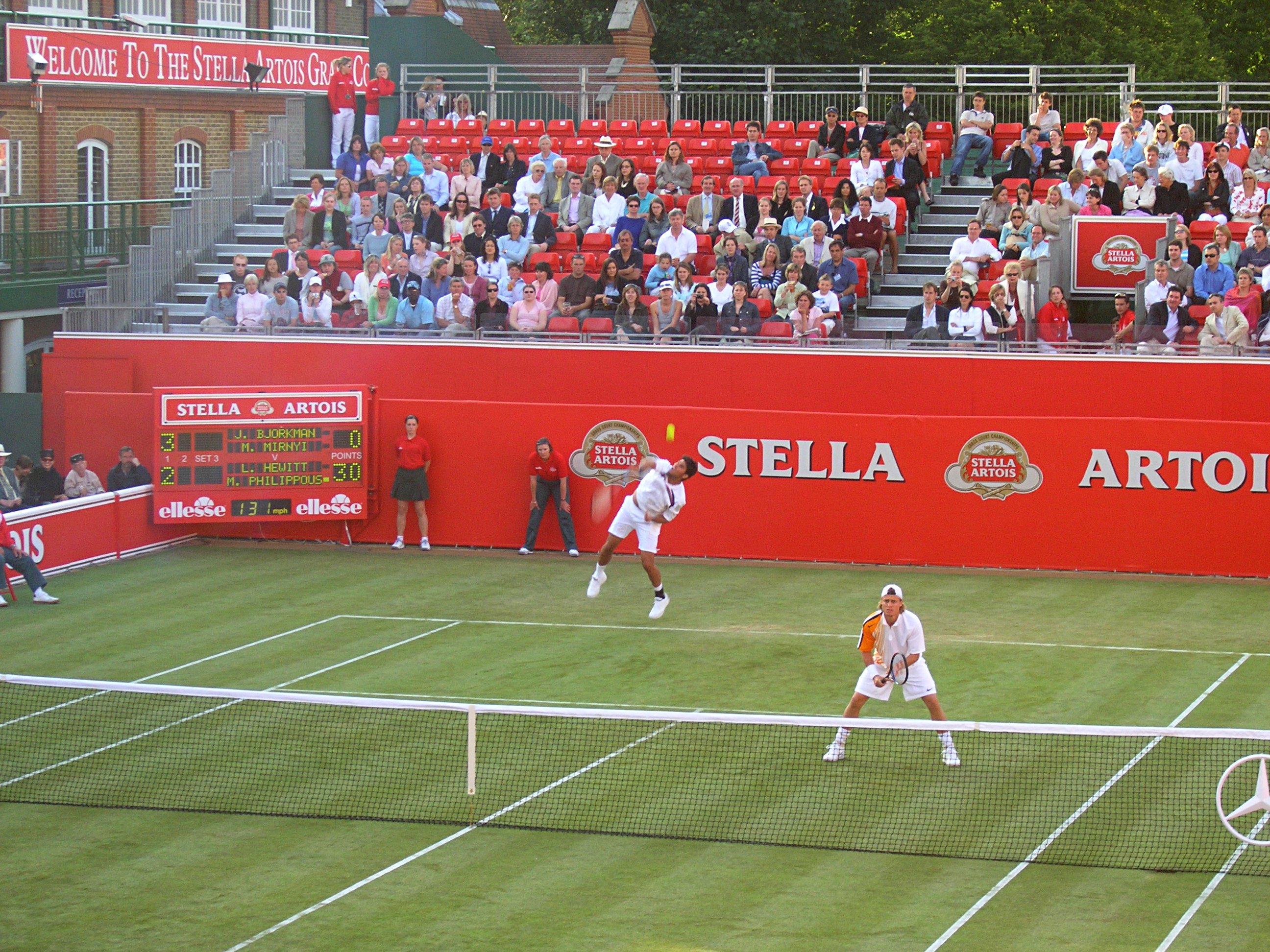
Lleyton Hewitt and Mark Philippoussis at the 2005 Queen's Club Championships

=== Champions by country ===
Champions only counted for tournaments held from 1890 once the event had moved to the Queen's Club.

¤ Former country

==== Men's singles ====
Country	Winner	First title	Last title
United States (USA)	34	1905	2024
Great Britain (GBR)	31	1890	2016
Australia (AUS)	26	1919	2006
Germany (GER) (Note: Includes 3 titles won by a player from West Germany)	6	1939	1996
Spain (SPA)	6	1960	2025
New Zealand (NZL)	4	1907	1912
South Africa (RSA)	2	1951	1992
Czechoslovakia (TCH)	2	1989	1990
Croatia (CRO)	2	2012	2018
Italy (ITA)	2	2021	2022
Japan (JPN)	1	1921	1921
Canada (CAN)	1	1927	1927
India (IND)	1	1959	1959
Romania (ROU)	1	1973	1973
Mexico (MEX)	1	1977	1977
Sweden (SWE)	1	1991	1991
Bulgaria (BUL)	1	2014	2014
Argentina (ARG)	1	2026	2026

==== Women's singles ====
Country	Winner	First title	Last title
Great Britain (GBR)	40	1890	1969
United States (USA)	19	1923	1972
Poland (POL)	4	1936	1939
France (FRA)	3	1934	1966
South Africa (RSA)	3	1952	1965
Chile (CHL)	1	1935	1935
Mexico (MEX)	1	1959	1959
Soviet Union (SUN)	1	1973	1973
Germany (GER)	1	2025	2025
Croatia (CRO)	1	2026	2026

==== Men's doubles ====
Country	Winner	First title	Last title
United States (USA)	33	1969	2023
Australia (AUS)	23	1969	2006
France (FRA)	9	1986	2021
Great Britain (GBR)	6	1990	2025
Canada (CAN)	5	1999	2012
Sweden (SWE)	4	1992	1998
Croatia (CRO)	4	2022	2026
Netherlands (NED)	3	1970	1973
South Africa (RSA)	3	1978	2009
Zimbabwe (ZIM)	3	2002	2006
India (IND)	2	1977	1977
Bahamas (BAH)	2	2003	2007
Serbia (SER)	2	2008	2010
Brazil (BRA)	2	2014	2017
Russia (RUS)	1	2009	2009
Israel (ISR)	1	2010	2010
Belarus (BLR)	1	2012	2012
Austria (AUT)	1	2014	2014
Spain (SPA)	1	2019	2019
New Zealand (NZL)	1	2024	2024
El Salvador (SLV)	1	2026	2026

==== Women's doubles ====
Country	Winner	First title	Last title
United States (USA)	7	1971	2025
Netherlands (NED)	1	2025	2025
Slovakia (SVK)	1	2026	2026
Great Britain (GBR)	1	2026	2026

=== Players and winners ===
- Most titles – Andy Murray (5 singles, 1 doubles) & Ethel Thomson Larcombe (6 singles) (6).
- Most singles titles – Ethel Thomson Larcombe (6).
- Most singles finals – Edith Austin (10).
- Youngest winner – Boris Becker, 17 years 207 days in 1985.
- Oldest winner – Major Ritchie, 38 years old in 1909 (Open Era oldest winner was Feliciano López at 37 years old in 2019).
- Highest-ranked champion – Ivan Lendl in 1989 and 1990, Stefan Edberg in 1991 and Lleyton Hewitt in 2002 ranked 1 in the world.
- Lowest-ranked champion – Feliciano López, ranked 113 in the world in 2019.
- Lowest-ranked finalist – Laurence Tieleman, ranked 253 in the world in 1998.
- Winners of both events – Pete Sampras in 1995 (doubles with Todd Martin), Mark Philippoussis in 1997 (doubles with Patrick Rafter), and Feliciano López in 2019 (doubles with Andy Murray).
- 10 players have completed the Queen's/Wimbledon double, winning both events back to back, including Don Budge, Roy Emerson, John McEnroe, Jimmy Connors, Boris Becker, Pete Sampras, Lleyton Hewitt, Rafael Nadal, Andy Murray and Carlos Alcaraz; only McEnroe, Sampras and Murray have completed this twice.

=== Attendance ===
Pre-2017, the Centre Court held 6,479 spectators. From 2017 onwards, capacity increased by over 2,000 to almost 9,000 seats. While the 2025 ATP tournament had a weekly attendance of 71,000, the 2026 WTA tournament also sold over 70,000 tickets, reaching capacity for 5 of the 7 days and reaching 98% of total capacity throughout the week.

== See also ==
- British Covered Court Championships – indoor tournament played at the Queen's Club between 1895 and 1971.
