= Jan Apell =

Swedish tennis player

- Country (sports): Sweden
- Residence: Kungsbacka, Sweden
- Born: 4 November 1969 (age 56) Gothenburg, Sweden
- Height: 1.83 m (6 ft 0 in)
- Turned pro: 1988
- Plays: Left-handed
- Prize money: $1,404,957

Singles
- Career record: 44–68
- Career titles: 0; 3 Challenger, 0 Futures
- Highest ranking: No. 62 (31 July 1995)

Grand Slam singles results
- Australian Open: 2R (1995, 1998)
- French Open: 1R (1995)
- Wimbledon: 2R (1995)
- US Open: 2R (1994)

Doubles
- Career record: 121–73
- Career titles: 9; 7 Challenger, 0 Futures
- Highest ranking: No. 10 (20 June 1994)

Grand Slam doubles results
- Australian Open: SF (1994)
- French Open: F (1994)
- Wimbledon: 3R (1994, 1995)
- US Open: 2R (1992)

Other doubles tournaments
- Tour Finals: W (1994)

Mixed doubles
- Career titles: 0

Grand Slam mixed doubles results
- Wimbledon: QF (1993)
- Last updated on: 30 September 2022.

Jan Apell (born 4 November 1969) is a former tennis player from Sweden, who in 1994 won the ATP Tour World Championship in doubles and Davis Cup. The left-hander has retired from tennis unbeaten in Davis Cup after five matches, and played most of his career with Jonas Björkman. He also has a Son call Emil Apell and a Daughter named Elin Apell.

== ATP career finals ==
=== Singles: 1 (1 runner-up) ===
Legend Grand Slam Tournaments (0–0) ATP World Tour Finals (0–0) ATP Masters Series (0–0) ATP Championship Series (0–1) ATP World Series (0–0)	Finals by surface Hard (0–0) Clay (0–1) Grass (0–0) Carpet (0–0)	Finals by setting Outdoors (0–1) Indoors (0–0)

Result	W–L	Date	Tournament	Tier	Surface	Opponent	Score
Loss	0–1	Jul 1995	Stuttgart, Germany	Championship Series	Clay	(Austria) Thomas Muster	2–6, 2–6

=== Doubles: 15 (9 titles, 6 runners-up) ===
Legend Grand Slam Tournaments (0–1) ATP World Tour Finals (1–0) ATP Masters Series (0–2) ATP Championship Series (0–0) ATP World Series (8–3)	Finals by surface Hard (4–1) Clay (3–2) Grass (1–1) Carpet (1–2)	Finals by setting Outdoors (7–4) Indoors (2–2)

Result	W–L	Date	Tournament	Tier	Surface	Partner	Opponents	Score
Win	1–0	Apr 1993	Seoul, South Korea	World Series	Hard	(Sweden) Peter Nyborg	(United Kingdom) Neil Broad (South Africa) Gary Muller	5–7, 7–6, 6–2
Loss	1–1	Nov 1993	Moscow, Russia	World Series	Carpet	(Sweden) Jonas Björkman	(Netherlands) Jacco Eltingh (Netherlands) Paul Haarhuis	1–6, ret.
Win	2–1	Feb 1994	Scottsdale, United States	World Series	Hard	(United States) Ken Flach	(United States) Alex O'Brien (Australia) Sandon Stolle	6–4, 6–4
Loss	2–2	Jun 1994	Roland Garos, France	Grand Slam	Clay	(Sweden) Jonas Björkman	(Zimbabwe) Byron Black (United States) Jonathan Stark	4–6, 6–7
Win	3–2	Jun 1994	Queen's, United Kingdom	World Series	Grass	(Sweden) Jonas Björkman	(Australia) Todd Woodbridge (Australia) Mark Woodforde	3–6, 7–6, 6–4
Win	4–2	Jul 1994	Båstad, Sweden	World Series	Clay	(Sweden) Jonas Björkman	(Sweden) Nicklas Kulti (Sweden) Mikael Tillström	6–2, 6–3
Win	5–2	Aug 1994	Schenectady, United States	World Series	Hard	(Sweden) Jonas Björkman	(Netherlands) Jacco Eltingh (Netherlands) Paul Haarhuis	6–4, 7–6
Loss	5–3	Oct 1994	Tel Aviv, Israel	World Series	Hard	(Sweden) Jonas Björkman	(South Africa) Lan Bale (South Africa) John-Laffnie de Jager	7–6. 2–6, 6–7
Loss	5–4	Oct 1994	Stockholm, Sweden	Masters Series	Carpet	(Sweden) Jonas Björkman	(Australia) Todd Woodbridge (Australia) Mark Woodforde	3–6, 4–6
Win	6–4	Nov 1994	Antwerp, Belgium	World Series	Carpet	(Sweden) Jonas Björkman	(Netherlands) Hendrik Jan Davids (Canada) Sébastien Lareau	4–6, 6–1, 6–2
Win	7–4	Nov 1994	Jakarta, Indonesia	ATP Finals	Hard	(Sweden) Jonas Björkman	(Australia) Todd Woodbridge (Australia) Mark Woodforde	6–4, 4–6, 4–6, 7–6^{(7–5)}, 7–6^{(8–6)}
Loss	7–5	May 1995	Rome, Italy	Masters Series	Clay	(Sweden) Jonas Björkman	(Czech Republic) Cyril Suk (Czech Republic) Daniel Vacek	3–6. 4–6
Loss	7–6	Jun 1995	Queen's, United Kingdom	World Series	Grass	(Sweden) Jonas Björkman	(United States) Todd Martin (United States) Pete Sampras	6–7, 4–6
Win	8–6	Jul 1995	Båstad, Sweden	World Series	Clay	(Sweden) Jonas Björkman	(Australia) Jon Ireland (Australia) Andrew Kratzmann	6–3, 6–0
Win	9–6	Apr 1996	Paget, Bermuda	World Series	Clay	(South Africa) Brent Haygarth	(Australia) Pat Cash (Australia) Patrick Rafter	3–6, 6–1, 6–3

== ATP Challenger and ITF Futures finals ==
=== Singles: 7 (3–4) ===
Legend ATP Challenger (3–4) ITF Futures (0–0)	Finals by surface Hard (1–2) Clay (1–1) Grass (0–0) Carpet (1–1)

Result	W–L	Date	Tournament	Tier	Surface	Opponent	Score
Loss	0–1	Apr 1991	Nagoya, Japan	Challenger	Hard	(United States) John Stimpson	1–6, 3–6
Win	1–1	Jul 1991	Hanko, Finland	Challenger	Clay	(Switzerland) Claudio Mezzadri	6–2, 6–4
Win	2–1	Oct 1992	Cherbourg, France	Challenger	Carpet	(Germany) Christian Saceanu	6–3, 6–7, 7–6
Loss	2–2	Jul 1993	Ostend, Belgium	Challenger	Clay	(France) Jean-Philippe Fleurian	6–7, 5–7
Loss	2–3	Nov 1993	Aachen, Germany	Challenger	Carpet	(Sweden) Jonas Björkman	3–6, 6–3, 5–7
Loss	2–4	Mar 1996	Stockholm, Sweden	Challenger	Hard	(Belgium) Johan Van Herck	3–6, 5–7
Win	3–4	Nov 1997	Réunion Island, Réunion	Challenger	Hard	(France) Arnaud Clément	6–4, 7–6

=== Doubles: 13 (7–6) ===
Legend ATP Challenger (7–6) ITF Futures (0–0)	Finals by surface Hard (0–2) Clay (4–2) Grass (0–0) Carpet (3–2)

Result	W–L	Date	Tournament	Tier	Surface	Partner	Opponents	Score
Loss	0–1	Sep 1990	Gevrey-Chambertin, France	Challenger	Carpet	(Sweden) Peter Nyborg	(Iran) Mansour Bahrami (France) Rodolphe Gilbert	5–7, 2–6
Win	1–1	Jul 1991	Hanko, Finland	Challenger	Clay	(Finland) Olli Rahnasto	(Sweden) Patrik Albertsson (Sweden) Jörgen Windahl	walkover
Win	2–1	Sep 1991	Graz, Austria	Challenger	Clay	(Israel) Raviv Weidenfeld	(Canada) Sébastien Leblanc (Germany) Markus Naewie	6–3, 6–3
Loss	2–2	Sep 1991	Messina, Italy	Challenger	Hard	(Germany) Markus Naewie	(Italy) Renzo Furlan (Argentina) Guillermo Pérez Roldán	4–6, 2–6
Loss	2–3	Apr 1992	Birmingham, United States	Challenger	Clay	(Sweden) Peter Nyborg	(United States) Bret Garnett (Sweden) Tobias Svantesson	4–6, 6–7
Win	3–3	Jun 1992	Salzburg, Austria	Challenger	Clay	(Sweden) Mikael Tillström	(Spain) Jordi Arrese (Sweden) Nils Holm	3–6, 6–2, 6–2
Win	4–3	Jan 1993	Heilbronn, Germany	Challenger	Carpet	(Sweden) Jonas Björkman	(United States) Brian Devening (Sweden) Peter Nyborg	6–2, 7–6
Loss	4–4	Feb 1993	Wolfsburg, Germany	Challenger	Carpet	(Denmark) Michael Mortensen	(United States) Donald Johnson (India) Leander Paes	6–7, 1–6
Win	5–4	Feb 1993	Rennes, France	Challenger	Carpet	(Sweden) Jonas Björkman	(Portugal) João Cunha-Silva (Germany) Marc-Kevin Goellner	7–6, 6–3
Loss	5–5	Aug 1993	Liège, Belgium	Challenger	Clay	(Australia) Paul Kilderry	(South Africa) Brendan Curry (South Africa) Kirk Haygarth	3–6, 6–4, 4–6
Win	6–5	Aug 1993	Geneva, Switzerland	Challenger	Clay	(Sweden) Nicklas Utgren	(Switzerland) Claudio Mezzadri (Argentina) Christian Miniussi	6–4, 6–2
Win	7–5	Nov 1993	Aachen, Germany	Challenger	Carpet	(Sweden) Jonas Björkman	(United States) Mike Briggs (United States) Trevor Kronemann	7–5, 7–6
Loss	7–6	Mar 1995	Indian Wells, United States	Challenger	Hard	(United States) Mike Bauer	(Sweden) Nicklas Kulti (Sweden) Mikael Tillström	6–7, 4–6

== Performance timelines ==
Key
W	F	SF	QF	#R	RR	Q#	DNQ	A	NH

(W) winner; (F) finalist; (SF) semifinalist; (QF) quarterfinalist; (#R) rounds 4, 3, 2, 1; (RR) round-robin stage; (Q#) qualification round; (DNQ) did not qualify; (A) absent; (NH) not held; (SR) strike rate (events won / competed); (W–L) win–loss record.

=== Singles ===
Tournament	1989	1990	1991	1992	1993	1994	1995	1996	1997	1998	1999	SR	W–L	Win %
Grand Slam tournaments
Australian Open	1R	A	A	A	1R	Q2	2R	1R	A	2R	Q2	0 / 5	2–5	29%
French Open	A	A	A	A	Q1	A	1R	A	A	A	A	0 / 1	0–1	0%
Wimbledon	A	Q1	A	A	Q2	A	2R	A	A	A	A	0 / 1	1–1	50%
US Open	A	A	A	Q1	A	2R	1R	A	A	A	A	0 / 2	1–2	33%
Win–loss	0–1	0–0	0–0	0–0	0–1	1–1	2–4	0–1	0–0	1–1	0–0	0 / 9	4–9	31%
ATP Masters Series
Indian Wells	A	A	A	A	A	A	Q3	A	A	A	A	0 / 0	0–0	–
Miami	A	A	A	A	A	3R	2R	A	A	A	A	0 / 2	3–2	60%
Monte Carlo	A	A	A	A	A	1R	A	A	A	A	A	0 / 1	0–1	0%
Hamburg	A	1R	A	A	A	2R	A	A	A	1R	A	0 / 3	1–3	25%
Rome	A	A	A	A	A	Q3	A	A	A	A	A	0 / 0	0–0	–
Cincinnati	A	A	A	A	A	Q2	A	A	A	A	A	0 / 0	0–0	–
Win–loss	0–0	0–1	0–0	0–0	0–0	3–3	1–1	0–0	0–0	0–1	0–0	0 / 6	4–6	40%

=== Doubles ===
Tournament	1989	1990	1991	1992	1993	1994	1995	1996	1997	1998	SR	W–L	Win %
Grand Slam tournaments
Australian Open	1R	A	A	A	A	SF	1R	3R	A	2R	0 / 5	7–5	58%
French Open	A	A	A	A	1R	F	2R	A	A	A	0 / 3	6–3	67%
Wimbledon	A	Q1	A	A	1R	3R	3R	A	A	A	0 / 3	4–3	57%
US Open	A	A	A	2R	A	1R	A	A	A	A	0 / 2	1–2	33%
Win–loss	0–1	0–0	0–0	1–1	0–2	11–4	3–3	2–1	0–0	1–1	0 / 13	18–13	58%
Year-end Championships
ATP Finals	Did not qualify					W	Did not qualify				1 / 1	4–1	80%
ATP Masters Series
Indian Wells	A	A	A	A	A	QF	QF	A	A	A	0 / 2	3–2	60%
Miami	A	A	A	A	A	QF	2R	A	A	A	0 / 2	2–2	50%
Monte Carlo	A	A	A	A	A	2R	A	A	A	A	0 / 1	1–1	50%
Hamburg	A	A	A	A	A	1R	A	A	A	A	0 / 1	0–1	0%
Rome	A	A	A	A	A	QF	F	A	A	A	0 / 2	6–2	75%
Cincinnati	A	A	A	A	A	1R	A	A	A	A	0 / 1	0–1	0%
Win–loss	0–0	0–0	0–0	0–0	0–0	7–6	5–3	0–0	0–0	0–0	0 / 9	12–9	57%

== See also ==
- List of Sweden Davis Cup team representatives
