= 2007 Artois Championships =

- Date: 11–17 June
- Edition: 105th
- Category: International Series
- Draw: 56S / 24D
- Prize money: $775,000
- Surface: Grass / outdoor
- Location: London, United Kingdom
- Venue: Queen's Club

Champions

Singles
- (United States) Andy Roddick

Doubles
- (The Bahamas) Mark Knowles / (Canada) Daniel Nestor
← 2006 ·	Queen's Club Championships	· 2008 →

The 2007 Artois Championships, also known as the Queen's Club Championships, was a men's tennis tournament that was part of the International Series of the 2007 ATP Tour. It was the 104th edition of the event and was held on outdoor grass courts at the Queen's Club in London, United Kingdom, from 11 June until 17 June 2007. Second-seeded Andy Roddick won the singles title, his fourth win at the event after 2003, 2004 and 2005.

== Finals ==
=== Singles ===
(United States) Andy Roddick defeated (France) Nicolas Mahut 4–6, 7–6^{(9–7)}, 7–6^{(7–2)}

- It was Roddick's 1st singles title of the year and the 22nd of his career.

=== Doubles ===
(The Bahamas) Mark Knowles / (Canada) Daniel Nestor defeated (United States) Bob Bryan / (United States) Mike Bryan 7–6^{(7–4)}, 7–5

== Juniors ==
(Belarus) Uladzimir Ignatik defeated (Portugal) Gastão Elias 7–5, 6–0
