= 2004 Stella Artois Championships – Singles =

Singles
- 2004 Stella Artois Championships

Final
- Champion: (United States) Andy Roddick
- Runner-up: (France) Sébastien Grosjean
- Score: 7–6^{(7–4)}, 6–4

Details
- Draw: 56
- Seeds: 16

Events
Singles	Doubles
← 2003 ·	Queen's Club Championships	· 2005 →

Andy Roddick was the defending champion and won in the final 7–6^{(7–4)}, 6–4 against Sébastien Grosjean.

== Seeds ==
The top eight seeds received a bye to the second round.

1. (United States) Andy Roddick (champion)
2. (Argentina) Guillermo Coria (second round)
3. (United States) Andre Agassi (second round)
4. (United Kingdom) Tim Henman (second round)
5. (France) Sébastien Grosjean (final)
6. (Australia) Lleyton Hewitt (semifinals)
7. (Thailand) Paradorn Srichaphan (quarterfinals)
8. (Netherlands) Sjeng Schalken (third round)
9. (Australia) Mark Philippoussis (first round)
10. (Belarus) Max Mirnyi (first round)
11. (United States) Taylor Dent (first round)
12. (United States) Robby Ginepri (second round)
13. (Spain) David Ferrer (first round)
14. (Croatia) Ivo Karlović (third round)
15. (Czech Republic) Radek Štěpánek (quarterfinals)
16. (United States) Todd Martin (second round)

== Draw ==
=== Key ===
- Q = Qualifier
- WC = Wild card
- LL = Lucky loser
- Alt = Alternate
- SE = Special exempt
- PR = Protected ranking
- ITF = ITF entry
- JE = Junior exempt
- w/o = Walkover
- r = Retired
- d = Defaulted
- SR = Special ranking

=== Finals ===
Semifinals
1	(United States) Andy Roddick	7^{9}	7
6	(Australia) Lleyton Hewitt	6^{7}	5
Q	(South Korea) Hyung-Taik Lee	7^{7}	6^{3}	2
5	(France) Sébastien Grosjean	6^{4}	7^{7}	6

Final
1	(United States) Andy Roddick	7^{7}	6
5	(France) Sébastien Grosjean	6^{4}	4

=== Top half ===
==== Section 1 ====
First round
(Netherlands) J van Lottum	6	1	1
(Slovakia) K Kučera	4	6	6
(Croatia) M Ančić	6	6
Q	(United States) J Morrison	3	4
(Belgium) O Rochus	4	3
16	(United States) T Martin	6	6
10	(Belarus) M Mirnyi	4	7^{7}	4
(France) N Mahut	6	6^{2}	6
(France) J Benneteau	4	5
(France) A Dupuis	6	7
(South Africa) W Moodie	7^{9}	7^{7}
(United States) A Bogomolov Jr.	6^{7}	6^{5}

Second round
1	(United States) A Roddick	7^{7}	6
(Slovakia) K Kučera	6^{4}	2
(Croatia) M Ančić	7^{7}	4	6
16	(United States) T Martin	6^{5}	6	2
(France) N Mahut	6^{7}	4
(France) A Dupuis	7^{9}	6
(South Africa) W Moodie	3	2
7	(Thailand) P Srichaphan	6	6

Third round
1	(United States) A Roddick	7^{7}	4	6
(Croatia) M Ančić	6^{3}	6	4
(France) A Dupuis	3	5
7	(Thailand) P Srichaphan	6	7

Quarterfinals
1	(United States) A Roddick	6	6
7	(Thailand) P Srichaphan	3	3

==== Section 2 ====
First round
(France) R Gasquet	6^{4}	6^{4}
(Russia) I Andreev	7^{7}	7^{7}
WC	(Canada) F Dancevic	7	1	7^{7}
WC	(United Kingdom) A Parmar	5	6	6^{5}
(France) O Patience	4	7^{7}	6
13	(Spain) D Ferrer	6	6^{2}	4
11	(United States) T Dent	7	5	6^{3}
Q	(United Kingdom) J Delgado	5	7	7^{7}
(Belgium) C Rochus	3	6	5
WC	(United Kingdom) J Marray	6	4	7
(Spain) M López	6	1	6
(Russia) D Tursunov	2	6	3

Second round
WC/3	(United States) A Agassi	6	6^{2}	6^{3}
(Russia) I Andreev	4	7^{7}	7^{7}
WC	(Canada) F Dancevic	3	4
(France) O Patience	6	6
Q	(United Kingdom) J Delgado	4	3
WC	(United Kingdom) J Marray	6	6
(Spain) M López	3	2
6	(Australia) L Hewitt	6	6

Third round
(Russia) I Andreev	6	7
(France) O Patience	4	5
WC	(United Kingdom) J Marray	6^{2}	6^{8}
6	(Australia) L Hewitt	7^{7}	7^{10}

Quarterfinals
(Russia) I Andreev	3	5
6	(Australia) L Hewitt	6	7

=== Bottom half ===
==== Section 3 ====
First round
(Czech Republic) J Vacek	6^{5}	3
Q	(South Africa) W Whitehouse	7^{7}	6
(United Kingdom) G Rusedski	6	3	4
Q	(South Korea) H-T Lee	3	6	6
(France) C Saulnier	2	1
12	(United States) R Ginepri	6	6
15	(Croatia) I Karlović	6	6^{5}	7^{7}
(United States) J-M Gambill	4	7^{7}	6^{5}
(Sweden) T Enqvist	7^{7}	6
Q	(Japan) T Suzuki	6^{3}	4
(Slovakia) K Beck	6	6
(Belgium) G Elseneer	3	4

Second round
8	(Netherlands) S Schalken	7^{7}	6
Q	(South Africa) W Whitehouse	6^{4}	3
Q	(South Korea) H-T Lee	6	6
12	(United States) R Ginepri	3	2
15	(Croatia) I Karlović	7^{7}	6
(Sweden) T Enqvist	6^{5}	4
(Slovakia) K Beck	6	3	7^{8}
4	(United Kingdom) T Henman	2	6	6^{6}

Third round
8	(Netherlands) S Schalken	6^{3}	7^{8}	3
Q	(South Korea) H-T Lee	7^{7}	6^{6}	6
15	(Croatia) I Karlović	7^{7}	6^{3}	3
(Slovakia) K Beck	6^{4}	7^{7}	6

Quarterfinals
Q	(South Korea) H-T Lee	6	6
(Slovakia) K Beck	3	4

==== Section 4 ====
First round
Q	(Australia) T Reid	7	6
(France) T Ascione	5	3
(Croatia) G Ivanišević	7^{7}	4	4
(Romania) V Hănescu	6^{5}	6	6
Q	(United Kingdom) I Flanagan	7^{7}	7^{7}
9	(Australia) M Philippoussis	6^{2}	6^{3}
15	(Czech Republic) R Štěpánek	3	6	7^{7}
(Netherlands) R Sluiter	6	1	6^{5}
(Austria) S Koubek	4	4
(Italy) D Sanguinetti	6	6
(Chinese Taipei) Y-H Lu	6	6
(Australia) W Arthurs	2	4

Second round
5	(France) S Grosjean	6	6
Q	(Australia) T Reid	3	1
(Romania) V Hănescu	6^{4}	3
Q	(United Kingdom) I Flanagan	7^{7}	6
15	(Czech Republic) R Štěpánek	4	6	6
(Italy) D Sanguinetti	6	4	3
(Chinese Taipei) Y-H Lu	6	6
WC/2	(Argentina) G Coria	2	4

Third round
5	(France) S Grosjean	6	6
Q	(United Kingdom) I Flanagan	2	0
15	(Czech Republic) R Štěpánek	6	6
(Chinese Taipei) Y-H Lu	2	4

Quarterfinals
5	(France) S Grosjean	6	6
15	(Czech Republic) R Štěpánek	3	3
