= 2005 Stella Artois Championships – Doubles =

Doubles
- 2005 Stella Artois Championships

Final
- Champions: (United States) Bob Bryan; (United States) Mike Bryan
- Runners-up: (Sweden) Jonas Björkman; (Belarus) Max Mirnyi
- Score: 7–6^{(11–9)}, 7–6^{(7–4)}

Details
- Draw: 24

Events
Singles	Doubles
← 2004 ·	Queen's Club Championships	· 2006 →

Bob Bryan and Mike Bryan were the defending champions and successfully defended their title, defeating Jonas Björkman and Max Mirnyi 7–6^{(11–9)}, 7–6^{(7–4)} in the final.

== Seeds ==
All seeds receive a bye into the second round.

1. (Sweden) Jonas Björkman / (Belarus) Max Mirnyi (final)
2. (United States) Bob Bryan / (United States) Mike Bryan (champions)
3. (Zimbabwe) Wayne Black / (Zimbabwe) Kevin Ullyett (second round)
4. (Australia) Wayne Arthurs / (Australia) Paul Hanley (second round)
5. (Sweden) Simon Aspelin / (Australia) Todd Perry (semifinals)
6. (Czech Republic) František Čermák / (Czech Republic) Leoš Friedl (semifinals)
7. (Argentina) Gastón Etlis / (Argentina) Martín Rodríguez (quarterfinals)
8. (United States) Graydon Oliver / (United States) Jared Palmer (second round)

== Draw ==
=== Key ===
- Q = Qualifier
- WC = Wild card
- LL = Lucky loser
- Alt = Alternate
- SE = Special exempt
- PR = Protected ranking
- ITF = ITF entry
- JE = Junior exempt
- w/o = Walkover
- r = Retired
- d = Defaulted
- SR = Special ranking

=== Finals ===
Semifinals

Final

1
- (Sweden) Jonas Björkman
- (Belarus) Max Mirnyi
6
5
7

6
- (Czech Republic) František Čermák
- (Czech Republic) Leoš Friedl
3
7
5

1
- (Sweden) Jonas Björkman
- (Belarus) Max Mirnyi
6^{9}
6^{4}

2
- (United States) Bob Bryan
- (United States) Mike Bryan
7^{11}
7^{7}

5
- (Sweden) Simon Aspelin
- (Australia) Todd Perry
7^{16}
6^{4}
5

2
- (United States) Bob Bryan
- (United States) Mike Bryan
6^{14}
7^{7}
7

=== Top half ===
First round

Second round

Quarterfinals

Semifinals

1
- (Sweden) J Björkman
- (Belarus) M Mirnyi
6
6

WC
- (Australia) L Hewitt
- (Australia) M Philippoussis
4
6
6

WC
- (Australia) L Hewitt
- (Australia) M Philippoussis
3
3

- (United States) R Leach
- (United States) T Parrott
6
3
4

1
- (Sweden) J Björkman
- (Belarus) M Mirnyi
6
6

- (Australia) J Kerr
- (Argentina) S Prieto
4
6
4

7
- (Argentina) G Etlis
- (Argentina) M Rodríguez
3
4

- (Belgium) X Malisse
- (United States) J Thomas
6
3
6

- (Belgium) X Malisse
- (United States) J Thomas
3
6^{8}

7
- (Argentina) G Etlis
- (Argentina) M Rodríguez
6
7^{10}

1
- (Sweden) J Björkman
- (Belarus) M Mirnyi
6
5
7

6
- (Czech Republic) F Čermák
- (Czech Republic) L Friedl
3
7
5

3
- (Zimbabwe) W Black
- (Zimbabwe) K Ullyett
6^{5}
3

- (France) J Benneteau
- (France) R Gasquet
7^{7}
6

- (France) J Benneteau
- (France) R Gasquet
7^{7}
6

- (United States) J Gimelstob
- (United States) B MacPhie
6^{3}
3

- (France) J Benneteau
- (France) R Gasquet

WC
(United Kingdom) Mark Hilton
(United Kingdom) J Marray
3
4

6
- (Czech Republic) F Čermák
- (Czech Republic) L Friedl
w/o

- (Chile) F González
- (Thailand) P Srichaphan
6
6

- (Chile) F González
- (Thailand) P Srichaphan
4
6
1

6
- (Czech Republic) F Čermák
- (Czech Republic) L Friedl
6
1
6

=== Bottom half ===
First round

Second round

Quarterfinals

Semifinals

5
- (Sweden) S Aspelin
- (Australia) T Perry
6
6

- (Czech Republic) T Berdych
- (Czech Republic) R Štěpánek
6
6^{6}
7

- (Czech Republic) T Berdych
- (Czech Republic) R Štěpánek
2
3

- (The Bahamas) M Knowles
- (The Bahamas) M Merklein
4
7^{8}
5

5
- (Sweden) S Aspelin
- (Australia) T Perry
6
6

- (Australia) A Fisher
- (South Africa) C Haggard
4
4

- (Sweden) T Johansson
- (South Africa) R Koenig
4
4

- (Sweden) T Johansson
- (South Africa) R Koenig
6
6

- (Sweden) T Johansson
- (South Africa) R Koenig
3
6
6

4
- (Australia) W Arthurs
- (Australia) P Hanley
6
3
4

5
- (Sweden) S Aspelin
- (Australia) T Perry
7^{16}
6^{4}
5

2
- (United States) B Bryan
- (United States) M Bryan
6^{14}
7^{7}
7

8
- (United States) G Oliver
- (United States) J Palmer
7^{7}
6^{2}
6^{4}

- (France) A Clément
- (France) S Grosjean
6
6

- (France) A Clément
- (France) S Grosjean
6^{4}
7^{7}
7^{7}

- (France) N Mahut
- (France) P-H Mathieu
3
2

- (France) A Clément
- (France) S Grosjean
5
6
6^{2}

- (Slovakia) K Beck
- (Czech Republic) J Levinský
1
6
2

2
- (United States) B Bryan
- (United States) M Bryan
7
3
7^{7}

- (Croatia) M Ančić
- (South Africa) J Coetzee
6
3
6

- (Croatia) M Ančić
- (South Africa) J Coetzee
6^{3}
6^{5}

2
- (United States) B Bryan
- (United States) M Bryan
7^{7}
7^{7}
