= 2004 Stella Artois Championships =

- Date: 7–13 June
- Edition: 102nd
- Category: International Series
- Draw: 56S / 24D
- Prize money: $767,000
- Surface: Grass / outdoor
- Location: London, United Kingdom
- Venue: Queen's Club

Champions

Singles
- (United States) Andy Roddick

Doubles
- (United States) Bob Bryan / (United States) Mike Bryan
← 2003 ·	Queen's Club Championships	· 2005 →

The 2004 Stella Artois Championships was a men's tennis tournament played on grass courts at the Queen's Club in London in the United Kingdom and was part of the International Series of the 2004 ATP Tour. It was the 102nd edition of the tournament and was held from 7 June until 13 June 2004. First-seeded Andy Roddick won his second consecutive singles title at the event.

== Finals ==
=== Singles ===
(United States) Andy Roddick defeated (France) Sébastien Grosjean 7–6^{(7–4)}, 6–4

- It was Roddick's 3rd singles title of the year and the 14th of his career.

=== Doubles ===
(United States) Bob Bryan / (United States) Mike Bryan defeated (The Bahamas) Mark Knowles / (Canada) Daniel Nestor 6–4, 6–4

- It was Bob Bryan's 4th title of the year and the 18th of his career. It was Mike Bryan's 4th title of the year and the 20th of his career.
