= 2008 Stella Artois Championships – Doubles =

Doubles
- 2008 Stella Artois Championships

Final
- Champions: (Canada) Daniel Nestor (Serbia) Nenad Zimonjić
- Runners-up: (Brazil) Marcelo Melo (Brazil) André Sá
- Score: 6–4, 7–6^{(7–3)}

Details
- Draw: 24

Events
Singles	Doubles
← 2007 ·	Queen's Club Championships	· 2009 →

Mark Knowles and Daniel Nestor were the defending champions, but Knowles chose not to participate, and only Nestor competed that year.
Nestor partnered with Nenad Zimonjić, and won in the final 6–4, 7–6^{(7–3)}, against Marcelo Melo and André Sá.

== Seeds ==
All seeds receive a bye into the second round.

1. (United States) Bob Bryan / (United States) Mike Bryan (quarterfinals)
2. (Canada) Daniel Nestor / (Serbia) Nenad Zimonjić (champions)
3. (Sweden) Jonas Björkman / (Zimbabwe) Kevin Ullyett (quarterfinals)
4. (South Africa) Jeff Coetzee / (South Africa) Wesley Moodie (second round)
5. (Brazil) Marcelo Melo / (Brazil) André Sá (final)
6. (Belarus) Max Mirnyi / (United Kingdom) Jamie Murray (semifinals)
7. (Czech Republic) František Čermák / (Australia) Jordan Kerr (semifinals)
8. (India) Rohan Bopanna / (India) Mahesh Bhupathi (quarterfinals)

== Draw ==
=== Key ===
- Q = Qualifier
- WC = Wild card
- LL = Lucky loser
- Alt = Alternate
- SE = Special exempt
- PR = Protected ranking
- ITF = ITF entry
- JE = Junior exempt
- w/o = Walkover
- r = Retired
- d = Defaulted
- SR = Special ranking

=== Finals ===
Semifinals
5	(Brazil) Marcelo Melo (Brazil) André Sá	6	6^{4}	[10]
6	(Belarus) Max Mirnyi (United Kingdom) Jamie Murray	3	7^{7}	[6]
7	(Czech Republic) František Čermák (Australia) Jordan Kerr	3	6^{3}
2	(Canada) Daniel Nestor (Serbia) Nenad Zimonjić	6	7^{7}

Final
5	(Brazil) Marcelo Melo (Brazil) André Sá	4	6^{3}
2	(Canada) Daniel Nestor (Serbia) Nenad Zimonjić	6	7^{7}

=== Top half ===
First round
(United States) M Fish (United States) S Querrey	2	1
(Croatia) M Čilić (Croatia) I Karlović	6	6
(Serbia) N Djokovic (Serbia) J Tipsarević	4	6^{4}
ALT	(South Africa) R de Voest (South Africa) C Haggard	6	7^{7}
(United States) E Butorac (United States) R Ram	7^{7}	6
(Thailand) S Ratiwatana (Thailand) S Ratiwatana	6^{4}	4
(Italy) S Bolelli (Italy) A Seppi	7^{7}	6^{4}	[7]
(Australia) C Guccione (Australia) L Hewitt	6^{5}	7^{7}	[10]

Second round
1	(United States) B Bryan (United States) M Bryan	6	6
(Croatia) M Čilić (Croatia) I Karlović	4	2
ALT	(South Africa) R de Voest (South Africa) C Haggard	6^{3}	6^{6}
5	(Brazil) M Melo (Brazil) A Sá	7^{7}	7^{8}
4	(South Africa) J Coetzee (South Africa) W Moodie	6	3	[5]
(United States) E Butorac (United States) R Ram	4	6	[10]
(Australia) C Guccione (Australia) L Hewitt	7^{8}	6^{5}	[5]
6	(Belarus) M Mirnyi (United Kingdom) J Murray	6^{6}	7^{7}	[10]

Quarterfinals
1	(United States) B Bryan (United States) M Bryan	4	6	[7]
5	(Brazil) M Melo (Brazil) A Sá	6	1	[10]
(United States) E Butorac (United States) R Ram	6^{7}	6	[3]
6	(Belarus) M Mirnyi (United Kingdom) J Murray	7^{9}	4	[10]

Semifinals
5	(Brazil) M Melo (Brazil) A Sá	6	6^{4}	[10]
6	(Belarus) M Mirnyi (United Kingdom) J Murray	3	7^{7}	[6]

=== Bottom half ===
First round
(Spain) F López (Spain) F Verdasco	5	4
(Croatia) M Ančić (Austria) J Melzer	7	6
WC	(United Kingdom) A Murray (Venezuela) D Vallverdu	4	7	[10]
(France) R Gasquet (France) N Mahut	6	5	[4]
WC	(Spain) R Nadal (Argentina) M Hood	6^{4}	5
(Chile) F González (Ecuador) N Lapentti	7^{7}	7
(Russia) M Safin (France) P-H Mathieu	2	6	[9]
(Australia) T Perry (Australia) P Hanley	6	2	[11]

Second round
7	(Czech Republic) F Čermák (Australia) J Kerr	7^{7}	6
(Croatia) M Ančić (Austria) J Melzer	6^{1}	2
WC	(United Kingdom) A Murray (Venezuela) D Vallverdu	4	4
3	(Sweden) J Björkman (Zimbabwe) K Ullyett	6	6
8	(India) R Bopanna (India) M Bhupathi	w/o
(Chile) F González (Ecuador) N Lapentti
(Australia) T Perry (Australia) P Hanley	5	2
2	(Canada) D Nestor (Serbia) N Zimonjić	7	6

Quarterfinals
7	(Czech Republic) F Čermák (Australia) J Kerr	6	6
3	(Sweden) J Björkman (Zimbabwe) K Ullyett	3	4
8	(India) R Bopanna (India) M Bhupathi	4	4
2	(Canada) D Nestor (Serbia) N Zimonjić	6	6

Semifinals
7	(Czech Republic) F Čermák (Australia) J Kerr	3	6^{3}
2	(Canada) D Nestor (Serbia) N Zimonjić	6	7^{7}
