= Andy Roddick career statistics =

Career finals
Discipline	Type	Won	Lost	Total	WR
Singles	Grand Slam tournaments	1	4	5	0.20
Singles	Year-end championships	–	–	–	–
Singles	ATP Masters 1000*	5	4	9	0.55
Singles	Olympic Games	–	–	–	–
Singles	ATP Tour 500	5	3	8	0.62
Singles	ATP Tour 250	21	9	30	0.70
Singles	Total	32	20	52	0.62
Doubles	Grand Slam tournaments	–	–	–	–
Doubles	Year-end championships	–	–	–	–
Doubles	ATP Masters 1000*	1	1	2	0.50
Doubles	Olympic Games	–	–	–	–
Doubles	ATP Tour 500	–	1	1	0.00
Doubles	ATP Tour 250	3	2	5	0.60
Doubles	Total	4	4	8	0.50
Total		36	24	60	0.60
1) WR = Winning Rate; 2) * formerly known as "Super 9" (1996–1999), "Tennis Masters Series" (2000–2003) or "ATP Masters Series" (2004–2008).

This is a list of the main career statistics of retired professional American tennis player, Andy Roddick. Throughout his career, Roddick won thirty-two ATP singles titles including one grand slam singles title and five ATP Masters 1000 singles titles. He was also the runner-up at the Wimbledon Championships in 2004, 2005 and 2009 and the US Open in 2006, losing on all four occasions to Roger Federer. Roddick was also a four-time semifinalist at the Australian Open and a three-time semifinalist at the year-ending ATP World Tour Finals. On November 3, 2003, Roddick became the World No. 1 for the first time in his career.

== Career achievements ==
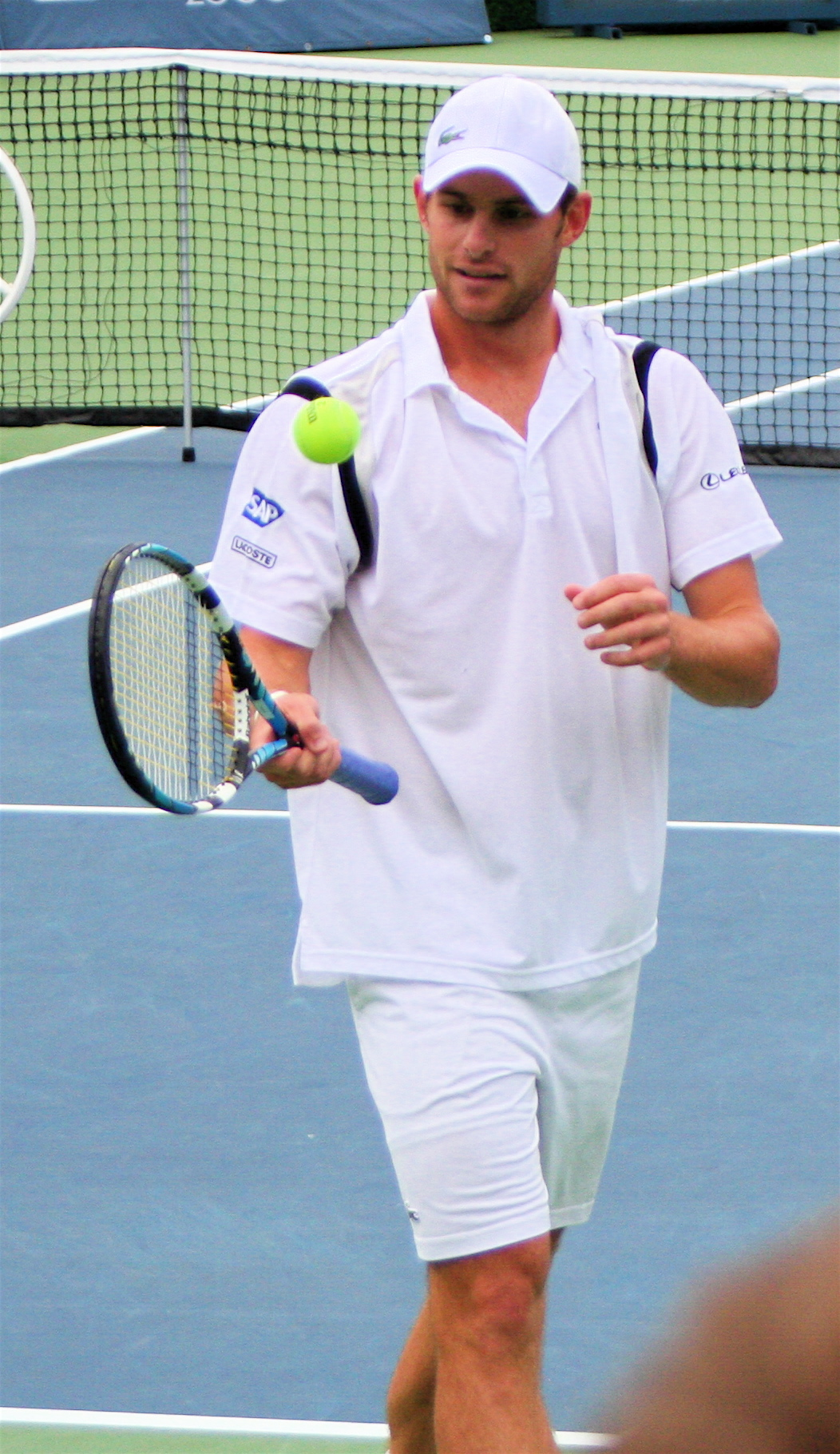
Roddick won thirty-two singles titles throughout his career including one grand slam singles title at the 2003 US Open.

Roddick reached his first career Grand Slam singles quarterfinal at the 2001 US Open, where he lost to fourth-seeded Australian and eventual champion Lleyton Hewitt in a five-set thriller 7–6, 3–6, 4–6, 6–3, 4–6. A year later, he reached his first Masters Series singles final at the 2002 Rogers Cup, losing in straight sets to Argentine Guillermo Cañas. The following year, Roddick reached his first grand slam semifinal at the 2003 Australian Open, where he lost to thirty-first seed Rainer Schüttler in four sets, 5–7, 6–2, 3–6, 3–6. In August, after beating Roger Federer for the first time in 5 meetings, Roddick would advance to the final of the 2003 Rogers Cup. Playing an Argentine in the Rogers Cup final for the second consecutive year, he would defeat David Nalbandian in straight sets to win his first Big title in singles at the Rogers Cup. The following week, Roddick would win his first five matches at the 2003 Cincinnati Masters to reach his third Masters Series final where he would face his childhood friend, Mardy Fish. After nearly 2 1/2 hours, Roddick would defeat Fish 4–6, 7–6^{(7-3)}, 7-6^{(7-4)} his second consecutive Masters Series title. Two weeks later, Roddick rallied from two sets, and a match point, down to defeat Nalbandian in five sets to reach his first Grand Slam singles final at the 2003 US Open. Roddick defeated No. 4-seed Spaniard Juan Carlos Ferrero in the final, 6–3, 7–6, 6–3, to win his first and only Grand Slam singles title of his career (he would make four more grand slam finals, but lost all four to Roger Federer. By virtue of his Canada Masters, Cincinnati Masters, and US Open titles in the same season, Roddick became just the 2nd man in the Open Era, joining Patrick Rafter, to complete the Summer Slam (Rafael Nadal would join them in 2013). Roddick's six Tour titles throughout the year allowed him to qualify for the year-ending 2003 ATP World Tour Finals for the first time in his career. He advanced to the semifinals of the event after victories over Guillermo Coria and Carlos Moyá in the round robin stage but lost in straight sets to then world No. 2 Roger Federer. Despite the loss, Roddick finished the year as the Year-end No. 1 for the first (and only) time in his career, becoming the first American player to finish as Year-end No. 1 since Andre Agassi in 1999.

In July 2004, Roddick reached his first Wimbledon final but lost in four sets to then World No. 1, Roger Federer. He reached the final of the event again the following year but once again lost to Federer, this time in straight sets. The following year, Roddick reached his fourth grand slam singles final but once again lost to Federer, this time in the final of the US Open. In 2007, Roddick reached the semifinals of the year-ending ATP World Tour Finals for the third and final time in his career, losing in straight sets to Spaniard, David Ferrer.

Roddick enjoyed a resurgent year in 2009, during which he reached the semifinals of the Australian Open for the fourth and final time in his career and the fourth round of the French Open for the first and only time in his career. The highlight of Roddick's year came at the 2009 Wimbledon Championships where he reached his third final at the event and fifth and final grand slam singles final. There, he lost to Federer 7–5, 6–7^{(6-8)}, 6–7^{(5-7)}, 6–3, 14–16 in 4 hours 16 minutes. On July 22, 2012, Roddick won his thirty-second and final career singles title at the Atlanta Tennis Championships, defeating Gilles Müller of Luxembourg in the final in three sets; Roddick won his first career singles title at the same event eleven years prior.

== Singles performance timeline ==
Key
W	F	SF	QF	#R	RR	Q#	P#	DNQ	A	Z#	PO	G	S	B	NMS	NTI	P	NH

(W) winner; (F) finalist; (SF) semifinalist; (QF) quarterfinalist; (#R) rounds 4, 3, 2, 1; (RR) round-robin stage; (Q#) qualification round; (P#) preliminary round; (DNQ) did not qualify; (A) absent; (Z#) Davis/Fed Cup Zonal Group (with number indication) or (PO) play-off; (G) gold, (S) silver or (B) bronze Olympic/Paralympic medal; (NMS) not a Masters tournament; (NTI) not a Tier I tournament; (P) postponed; (NH) not held; (SR) strike rate (events won / competed); (W–L) win–loss record.

Tournament	2000	2001	2002	2003	2004	2005	2006	2007	2008	2009	2010	2011	2012	SR	W–L	Win %
Grand Slam tournaments
Australian Open	A	A	2R	SF	QF	SF	4R	SF	3R	SF	QF	4R	2R	0 / 11	38–11	78%
French Open	A	3R	1R	1R	2R	2R	1R	1R	A	4R	3R	A	1R	0 / 10	9–10	47%
Wimbledon	A	3R	3R	SF	F	F	3R	QF	2R	F	4R	3R	3R	0 / 12	41–12	77%
US Open	1R	QF	QF	W	QF	1R	F	QF	QF	3R	2R	QF	4R	1 / 13	43–12	78%
Win–loss	0–1	8–3	7–4	17–3	15–4	12–4	11–4	13–4	7–3	16–4	10–4	9–3	6–4	1 / 46	131–45	74%
Year-end championships
ATP World Tour Finals	did not qualify			SF	SF	A*	RR	SF	RR	A*	RR	DNQ		0 / 6	8–11	42%
ATP World Tour Masters 1000
Indian Wells	A	A	A	QF	QF	SF	4R	SF	2R	SF	F	4R	3R	0 / 10	28–10	74%
Miami	2R	QF	2R	3R	W	2R	QF	QF	SF	QF	W	2R	4R	2 / 13	33–11	75%
Monte Carlo	A	A	3R	1R	A	A	A	A	A	A	A	A	A	0 / 2	2–2	50%
Hamburg / Madrid (Clay)^{1}	A	A	3R	2R	A	1R	A	A	A	QF	A	1R	A	0 / 5	4–5	44%
Rome	A	A	SF	2R	1R	3R	QF	3R	SF	A	A	1R	A	0 / 8	14–8	64%
Toronto / Montreal	A	QF	F	W	F	1R	A	QF	3R	SF	A	A	A	1 / 8	25–7	78%
Cincinnati	1R	1R	QF	W	SF	F	W	3R	A	2R	SF	1R	1R	2 / 12	29–10	74%
Stuttgart / Madrid (Hard) / Shanghai^{2}	A	3R	2R	3R	A	2R	3R	A	3R	2R	2R	QF	A	0 / 9	8–9	47%
Paris	A	2R	QF	SF	3R	SF	A	A	QF	A	QF	3R	A	0 / 8	14–8	64%
Win–loss	1–2	8–5	18–8	22–7	19–5	14–8	15–4	11–5	11–6	11–6	18–4	6–7	3–2	5 / 75	157–70	69%
Olympic Games
Summer Olympics	A	not held			3R	not held			A	not held			2R	0 / 2	3–2	60%
National representation
Davis Cup	A	1R	SF	PO	F	1R	SF	W	SF	QF	A	QF	A	1 / 10	33–12	73%
Career statistics
	2000	2001	2002	2003	2004	2005	2006	2007	2008	2009	2010	2011	2012	SR	W–L	Win %
Tournaments played	5	19	22	23	20	19	18	17	19	16	18	16	15	227		
Titles	0	3	2	6	4	5	1	2	3	1	2	1	2	32		
Finals reached	0	3	4	8	8	7	3	3	4	4	4	2	2	52		
Hardcourt win–loss	4–5	23–10	34–11	44–10	57–11	30–9	36–10	38–11	40–12	35–11	42–12	27–12	15–9	21 / 152	426–138	76%
Clay win–loss	0–0	12–1	14–7	12–6	5–5	10–3	5–6	5–3	4–3	4–2	2–1	2–2	0–4	5 / 37	75–43	64%
Grass win–loss	0–0	5–3	4–2	10–1	11–1	11–1	7–2	9–1	3–2	9–2	4–2	5–2	8–3	5 / 27	86–22	80%
Carpet win–loss	0–0	2–2	4–2	6–2	1–1	8–1	1–2	2–1	2–1	0–0	0–0	0–0	0–0	1 / 11	25–10	71%
Overall win–loss	4–5	42–16	56–22	72–19	74–18	59–14	49–20	54–16	49–18	48–15	48–18	34–16	23–16	32 / 227	612–213	74%
Win %	44%	72%	72%	79%	80%	81%	71%	77%	73%	76%	73%	68%	59%	74.18%		
Year-end ranking	156	14	10	1	2	3	6	6	8	7	8	14	39	$20,637,390		

- *Qualified for Year-end championships in 2005 and 2009, but pulled out both times due to injury.

^{1} Held as Hamburg Masters (outdoor clay) until 2008, Madrid Masters (outdoor clay) 2009 – onward.
^{2} Held as Stuttgart Masters (indoor hard) until 2001, Madrid Masters (indoor hard) from 2002 to 2008, and Shanghai Masters (outdoor hard) 2009 – onward.

== Significant finals ==
=== Grand Slam finals ===
==== Singles: 5 finals (1 title, 4 runner-ups) ====
Result	Year	Championship	Surface	Opponent	Score
Win	2003	US Open	Hard	(Spain) Juan Carlos Ferrero	6–3, 7–6^{(7–2)}, 6–3
Loss	2004	Wimbledon	Grass	(Switzerland) Roger Federer	6–4, 5–7, 6–7^{(3–7)}, 4–6
Loss	2005	Wimbledon	Grass	(Switzerland) Roger Federer	2–6, 6–7^{(2–7)}, 4–6
Loss	2006	US Open	Hard	(Switzerland) Roger Federer	2–6, 6–4, 5–7, 1–6
Loss	2009	Wimbledon	Grass	(Switzerland) Roger Federer	7–5, 6–7^{(6–8)}, 6–7^{(5–7)}, 6–3, 14–16

=== Masters Series finals ===
==== Singles: 9 finals (5 titles, 4 runner-ups) ====
Result	Year	Tournament	Surface	Opponent	Score
Loss	2002	Toronto, Canada	Hard	(Argentina) Guillermo Cañas	4–6, 5–7
Win	2003	Montreal, Canada	Hard	(Argentina) David Nalbandian	6–1, 6–3
Win	2003	Cincinnati, US	Hard	(United States) Mardy Fish	4–6, 7–6^{(7–3)}, 7–6^{(7–4)}
Win	2004	Miami, US	Hard	(Argentina) Guillermo Coria	6–7^{(2–7)}, 6–3, 6–1, ret.
Loss	2004	Toronto, Canada	Hard	(Switzerland) Roger Federer	5–7, 3–6
Loss	2005	Cincinnati, US	Hard	(Switzerland) Roger Federer	3–6, 5–7
Win	2006	Cincinnati, US (2)	Hard	(Spain) Juan Carlos Ferrero	6–3, 6–4
Loss	2010	Indian Wells, US	Hard	(Croatia) Ivan Ljubičić	6–7^{(3–7)}, 6–7^{(5–7)}
Win	2010	Miami, US (2)	Hard	(Czech Republic) Tomáš Berdych	7–5, 6–4

==== Doubles: 2 finals (1 title, 1 runner-up) ====
Result	Year	Tournament	Surface	Opponents	Opponents	Score
Win	2009	Indian Wells	Hard	(United States) Mardy Fish	(Belarus) Max Mirnyi (Israel) Andy Ram	3–6, 6–1, [14–12]
Loss	2011	Rome	Clay	(United States) Mardy Fish	(United States) John Isner (United States) Sam Querrey	W/O

== ATP career finals ==
=== Singles: 52 (32 titles, 20 runner-ups) ===
Legend Grand Slam tournaments (1–4) Year-end championships (0–0) ATP World Tour Masters 1000 (5–4) ATP World Tour 500 Series (5–3) ATP World Tour 250 Series (21–9)	Titles by surface Hard (21–15) Clay (5–2) Grass (5–3) Carpet (1–0)

Result	W/L	Date	Tournament	Surface	Opponent	Score
Win	1–0	Apr 2001	Atlanta, US (1)	Clay	(Belgium) Xavier Malisse	6–2, 6–4
Win	2–0	Apr 2001	Houston, US (1)	Clay	(South Korea) Hyung-Taik Lee	7–5, 6–3
Win	3–0	Aug 2001	Washington, D.C., US (1)	Hard	(Netherlands) Sjeng Schalken	6–2, 6–3
Win	4–0	Feb 2002	Memphis, US (1)	Hard (i)	(United States) James Blake	6–4, 3–6, 7–5
Loss	4–1	Mar 2002	Delray Beach, US	Hard	(Italy) Davide Sanguinetti	4–6, 6–4, 4–6
Win	5–1	Apr 2002	Houston, US (2)	Clay	(United States) Pete Sampras	7–6^{(11–9)}, 6–3
Loss	5–2	Aug 2002	Toronto, Canada	Hard	(Argentina) Guillermo Cañas	4–6, 5–7
Loss	5–3	Feb 2003	Memphis, US	Hard (i)	(United States) Taylor Dent	1–6, 4–6
Loss	5–4	Apr 2003	Houston, US	Clay	(United States) Andre Agassi	6–3, 3–6, 4–6
Win	6–4	May 2003	St. Pölten, Austria (1)	Clay	(Russia) Nikolay Davydenko	6–3, 6–2
Win	7–4	Jun 2003	London, UK (1)	Grass	(France) Sébastien Grosjean	6–3, 6–3
Win	8–4	Jul 2003	Indianapolis, US (1)	Hard	(Thailand) Paradorn Srichaphan	7–6^{(7–2)}, 6–4
Win	9–4	Aug 2003	Montreal, Canada (1)	Hard	(Argentina) David Nalbandian	6–1, 6–3
Win	10–4	Aug 2003	Cincinnati, US (1)	Hard	(United States) Mardy Fish	4–6, 7–6^{(7–3)}, 7–6^{(7–4)}
Win	11–4	Aug 2003	US Open, US (1)	Hard	(Spain) Juan Carlos Ferrero	6–3, 7–6^{(7–2)}, 6–3
Win	12–4	Feb 2004	San José, US (1)	Hard (i)	(United States) Mardy Fish	7–6^{(15–13)}, 6–4
Win	13–4	Mar 2004	Miami, US (1)	Hard	(Argentina) Guillermo Coria	6–7^{(2–7)}, 6–3, 6–1, ret.
Loss	13–5	Apr 2004	Houston, US	Clay	(Germany) Tommy Haas	3–6, 4–6
Win	14–5	Jun 2004	London, UK (2)	Grass	(France) Sébastien Grosjean	7–6^{(7–4)}, 6–4
Loss	14–6	Jul 2004	Wimbledon, UK	Grass	(Switzerland) Roger Federer	6–4, 5–7, 6–7^{(3–7)}, 4–6
Win	15–6	Jul 2004	Indianapolis, US (2)	Hard	(Germany) Nicolas Kiefer	6–2, 6–3
Loss	15–7	Aug 2004	Toronto, Canada	Hard	(Switzerland) Roger Federer	5–7, 3–6
Loss	15–8	Oct 2004	Bangkok, Thailand	Hard (i)	(Switzerland) Roger Federer	4–6, 0–6
Win	16–8	Feb 2005	San José, US (2)	Hard (i)	(France) Cyril Saulnier	6–0, 6–4
Win	17–8	Apr 2005	Houston, US (3)	Clay	(France) Sébastien Grosjean	6–2, 6–2
Win	18–8	Jun 2005	London, UK (3)	Grass	(Croatia) Ivo Karlović	7–6^{(9–7)}, 7–6^{(7–4)}
Loss	18–9	Jul 2005	Wimbledon, UK	Grass	(Switzerland) Roger Federer	2–6, 6–7^{(2–7)}, 4–6
Win	19–9	Aug 2005	Washington, D.C., US (2)	Hard	(United States) James Blake	7–5, 6–3
Loss	19–10	Aug 2005	Cincinnati, US	Hard	(Switzerland) Roger Federer	3–6, 5–7
Win	20–10	Oct 2005	Lyon, France (1)	Carpet (i)	(France) Gaël Monfils	6–3, 6–2
Loss	20–11	Jul 2006	Indianapolis, US	Hard	(United States) James Blake	6–4, 4–6, 6–7^{(5–7)}
Win	21–11	Aug 2006	Cincinnati, US (2)	Hard	(Spain) Juan Carlos Ferrero	6–3, 6–4
Loss	21–12	Sep 2006	US Open, US	Hard	(Switzerland) Roger Federer	2–6, 6–4, 5–7, 1–6
Loss	21–13	Feb 2007	Memphis, US	Hard (i)	(Germany) Tommy Haas	3–6, 2–6
Win	22–13	Jun 2007	London, UK (4)	Grass	(France) Nicolas Mahut	4–6, 7–6^{(9–7)}, 7–6^{(7–2)}
Win	23–13	Aug 2007	Washington, D.C., US (3)	Hard	(United States) John Isner	6–4, 7–6^{(7–4)}
Win	24–13	Feb 2008	San José, US (3)	Hard (i)	(Czech Republic) Radek Štěpánek	6–4, 7–5
Win	25–13	Mar 2008	Dubai, UAE (1)	Hard	(Spain) Feliciano López	6–7^{(8–10)}, 6–4, 6–2
Loss	25–14	Aug 2008	Los Angeles, US	Hard	(Argentina) Juan Martín del Potro	1–6, 6–7^{(2–7)}
Win	26–14	Sep 2008	Beijing, China (1)	Hard	(Israel) Dudi Sela	6–4, 6–7^{(6–8)}, 6–3
Loss	26–15	Jan 2009	Doha, Qatar	Hard	(United Kingdom) Andy Murray	4–6, 2–6
Win	27–15	Feb 2009	Memphis, US (2)	Hard (i)	(Czech Republic) Radek Štěpánek	7–5, 7–5
Loss	27–16	Jul 2009	Wimbledon, UK	Grass	(Switzerland) Roger Federer	7–5, 6–7^{(6–8)}, 6–7^{(5–7)}, 6–3, 14–16
Loss	27–17	Aug 2009	Washington, D.C., US	Hard	(Argentina) Juan Martín del Potro	6–3, 5–7, 6–7^{(6–8)}
Win	28–17	Jan 2010	Brisbane, Australia	Hard	(Czech Republic) Radek Štěpánek	7–6^{(7–2)}, 7–6^{(9–7)}
Loss	28–18	Feb 2010	San José, US	Hard (i)	(Spain) Fernando Verdasco	6–3, 4–6, 4–6
Loss	28–19	Mar 2010	Indian Wells, US	Hard	(Croatia) Ivan Ljubičić	6–7^{(3–7)}, 6–7^{(5–7)}
Win	29–19	Apr 2010	Miami, US (2)	Hard	(Czech Republic) Tomáš Berdych	7–5, 6–4
Loss	29–20	Jan 2011	Brisbane, Australia	Hard	(Sweden) Robin Söderling	3–6, 5–7
Win	30–20	Feb 2011	Memphis, US (3)	Hard (i)	(Canada) Milos Raonic	7–6^{(9–7)}, 6–7^{(11–13)}, 7–5
Win	31–20	Jun 2012	Eastbourne, UK	Grass	(Italy) Andreas Seppi	6–3, 6–2
Win	32–20	Jul 2012	Atlanta, US (2)	Hard	(Luxembourg) Gilles Müller	1–6, 7–6^{(7–2)}, 6–2

=== Doubles: 8 (4–4) ===
Legend Grand Slam tournaments (0–0) Year-end championships (0–0) ATP World Tour Masters 1000 (1–1) ATP World Tour 500 Series (0–1) ATP World Tour 250 Series (3–2)	Titles by surface Hard (3–3) Clay (1–1) Grass (0–0) Carpet (0–0)

Result	W/L	Date	Tournament	Surface	Partner	Opponents	Score
Win	1–0	Mar 2001	Delray Beach, US	Hard	(United States) Jan-Michael Gambill	(Japan) Thomas Shimada (South Africa) Myles Wakefield	6–3, 6–4
Loss	1–1	Jul 2001	Los Angeles, US	Hard	(United States) Jan-Michael Gambill	(United States) Bob Bryan (United States) Mike Bryan	5–7, 6–7^{(6–8)}
Win	2–1	Apr 2002	Houston, US	Clay	(United States) Mardy Fish	(United States) Jan-Michael Gambill (United States) Graydon Oliver	6–4, 6–4
Loss	2–2	Jan 2004	Doha, Qatar	Hard	(Austria) Stefan Koubek	(Czech Republic) Martin Damm (Czech Republic) Cyril Suk	2–6, 4–6
Win	3–2	Jul 2006	Indianapolis, US	Hard	(United States) Bobby Reynolds	(United States) Paul Goldstein (United States) Jim Thomas	6–4, 6–4
Win	4–2	Mar 2009	Indian Wells, US	Hard	(United States) Mardy Fish	(Belarus) Max Mirnyi (Israel) Andy Ram	3–6, 6–1, [14–12]
Loss	4–3	Oct 2009	Beijing, China	Hard	(The Bahamas) Mark Knowles	(United States) Bob Bryan (United States) Mike Bryan	4–6, 2–6
Loss	4–4	May 2011	Rome, Italy	Clay	(United States) Mardy Fish	(United States) John Isner (United States) Sam Querrey	W/O

== ATP Challenger Tour career finals ==
=== Singles: 4 (3 titles, 1 runner-up) ===
Result	W–L	Date	Tournament	Surface	Opponent	Score
Win	1–0	9 October 2000	Austin Challenger, United States	Hard	(United States) Michael Russell	6–4, 6–4
Win	2–0	12 November 2000	Burbank Challenger, United States	Hard	(United States) Kevin Kim	6–1, 6–2
Runner-up	2–1	26 November 2000	Knoxville Challenger, United States	Hard	(Italy) Cristiano Caratti	6–3, 6–7^{(1–7)}, 4–6
Win	3–1	28 January 2001	Waikoloa Challenger, United States	Hard	(United States) James Blake	1–6, 6–3, 6-1

=== Doubles: 2 (1 title, 1 runner-up) ===
Result	W–L	Date	Tournament	Surface	Partner	Opponents	Score
Runner-up	0–1	5 November 2000	Las Vegas Challenger, United States	Hard	(United States) Mardy Fish	(South Africa) Jeff Coetzee (South Africa) Marcos Ondruska	7–6^{(9–7)}, 6–7^{(6–8)}, 1–6
Win	1–1	22 April 2001	Bermuda Challenger	Clay	(United States) Paul Goldstein	(Japan) Thomas Shimada (South Africa) Grant Stafford	4–6, 6–3, 6–4

== Record against top 10 players ==
Roddick's match record against players who were ranked in the top 10, with those who reached No. 1 in boldface

- (Spain) Tommy Robredo 11–0
- (Austria) Jürgen Melzer 10–0
- (Spain) Fernando Verdasco 10–3
- (United States) Mardy Fish 9–3
- (Chile) Fernando González 9–3
- (United States) James Blake 9–3
- (France) Sébastien Grosjean 8–1
- (Thailand) Paradorn Srichaphan 7–1
- (Croatia) Ivan Ljubičić 7–4
- (Australia) **Lleyton Hewitt** 7–7
- (Canada) / (United Kingdom) Greg Rusedski 6–1
- (Czech Republic) Radek Štěpánek 6–1
- (Czech Republic) Tomáš Berdych 6–5
- (Germany) Tommy Haas 6–7
- (Croatia) Mario Ančić 5–0
- (Argentina) Guillermo Coria 5–0
- (Spain) **Juan Carlos Ferrero** 5–0
- (Sweden) Thomas Johansson 5–0
- (Germany) Nicolas Kiefer 5–0
- (Russia) Nikolay Davydenko 5–1
- (Sweden) Jonas Björkman 5–2
- (Serbia) **Novak Djokovic** 5–4
- (United States) Todd Martin 4–1
- (Spain) **Carlos Moyá** 4–1
- (Argentina) David Nalbandian 4–2
- (United States) John Isner 4–2
- (Russia) **Marat Safin** 4–3
- (Spain) David Ferrer 4–7
- (Latvia) Ernests Gulbis 3–0
- (Slovakia) Karol Kučera 3–0
- (Cyprus) Marcos Baghdatis 3–1
- (France) Arnaud Clément 3–2
- (Sweden) Thomas Enqvist 3–2
- (France) Richard Gasquet 3–2
- (Russia) Mikhail Youzhny 3–2
- (France) Gaël Monfils 3–5
- (United Kingdom) **Andy Murray** 3–8
- (Spain) **Rafael Nadal** 3–7
- (Switzerland) **Roger Federer** 3–21
- (Italy) Fabio Fognini 2–0
- (Spain) Nicolás Almagro 2–0
- (United States) Michael Chang 2–0
- (Spain) Àlex Corretja 2–0
- (South Africa) Wayne Ferreira 2–0
- (Czech Republic) Jiří Novák 2–0
- (Chile) **Marcelo Ríos** 2–0
- (Sweden) Joachim Johansson 2–1
- (United States) **Pete Sampras** 2–1
- (France) Jo-Wilfried Tsonga 2–1
- (South Africa) Kevin Anderson 2–2
- (France) Gilles Simon 2–2
- (Argentina) Guillermo Cañas 2–2
- (Serbia and Montenegro) / (Serbia) Janko Tipsarević 2–2
- (United Kingdom) Tim Henman 2–3
- (Sweden) Robin Söderling 2–4
- (Bulgaria) Grigor Dimitrov 1–0
- (Japan) Kei Nishikori 1–0
- (Argentina) Gastón Gaudio 1–0
- (Netherlands) Richard Krajicek 1–0
- (Ecuador) Nicolás Lapentti 1–0
- (Australia) Mark Philippoussis 1–0
- (Canada) Milos Raonic 1–0
- (United States) Jack Sock 1–0
- (Switzerland) Marc Rosset 1–0
- (Argentina) Juan Mónaco 1–1
- (Spain) Albert Costa 1–1
- (Brazil) **Gustavo Kuerten** 1–1
- (Croatia) Marin Čilić 1–2
- (Argentina) Juan Martín del Potro 1–4
- (Chile) Nicolás Massú 2–3
- (Germany) Rainer Schüttler 1–3
- (Switzerland) Stanislas Wawrinka 1–3
- (United States) **Andre Agassi** 1–5
- (Socialist Federal Republic of Yugoslavia) / (Croatia) Goran Ivanišević 0–1

=== Top 10 wins ===
- Roddick has a 37–73 record against players who were, at the time the match was played, ranked in the top 10.

Season	2000	2001	2002	2003	2004	2005	2006	2007	2008	2009	2010	2011	2012	**Total**
Wins	0	2	0	6	6	2	1	5	4	5	4	1	1	**37**

#	Player	Rank	Event	Surface	Rd	Score	Roddick Rank
2001
1.	(United States) Pete Sampras	4	Miami, United States	Hard	3R	7–6^{(7–2)}, 6–3	119
2.	(Brazil) Gustavo Kuerten	**1**	Montreal, Canada	Hard	3R	6–7^{(4–7)}, 6–4, 6–2	35
2003
3.	(United States) Andre Agassi	2	Queen's Club, London, England	Grass	SF	6–1, 6–7^{(5–7)}, 7–6^{(8–6)}	7
4.	(France) Sébastien Grosjean	10	Montreal, Canada	Hard	3R	6–3, 6–3	7
5.	(Switzerland) Roger Federer	3	Montreal, Canada	Hard	SF	6–4, 3–6, 7–6^{(7–3)}	7
6.	(Spain) Juan Carlos Ferrero	3	US Open, New York, United States	Hard	F	6–3, 7–6^{(7–2)}, 6–3	4
7.	(Spain) Carlos Moyá	7	Tennis Masters Cup, Houston, USA	Hard	RR	6–2, 3–6, 6–3	**1**
8.	(Argentina) Guillermo Coria	4	Tennis Masters Cup, Houston, USA	Hard	RR	6–3, 6–7^{(4–7)}, 6–3	**1**
2004
9.	(Spain) Carlos Moyá	6	Miami, United States	Hard	QF	5–7, 6–2, 7–5	3
10.	(Argentina) Guillermo Coria	4	Miami, United States	Hard	SF	6–7^{(2–7)}, 6–3, 6–1, ret.	3
11.	(Russia) Marat Safin	9	Bangkok, Thailand	Hard (i)	SF	7–6^{(7–1)}, 6–7^{(0–7)}, 7–6^{(7–2)}	2
12.	(United Kingdom) Tim Henman	7	Tennis Masters Cup, Houston, USA	Hard	RR	7–5, 7–6^{(8–6)}	2
13.	(Russia) Marat Safin	4	Tennis Masters Cup, Houston, USA	Hard	RR	7–6^{(9–7)}, 7–6^{(7–4)}	2
14.	(Argentina) Guillermo Coria	6	Tennis Masters Cup, Houston, USA	Hard	RR	7–6^{(7–4)}, 6–3	2
2005
15.	(Spain) Carlos Moyá	7	Indian Wells, United States	Hard	QF	6–7^{(4–7)}, 6–4, 6–1	3
16.	(Australia) Lleyton Hewitt	3	Cincinnati, United States	Hard	SF	6–4, 7–6^{(7–4)}	5
2006
17.	(Croatia) Ivan Ljubičić	4	Tennis Masters Cup, Shanghai, China	Hard (i)	RR	6–4, 6–7^{(9–11)}, 6–1	5
2007
18.	(Croatia) Mario Ančić	10	Australian Open, Melbourne, Australia	Hard	4R	6–3, 3–6, 6–1, 5–7, 6–4	7
19.	(Croatia) Ivan Ljubičić	8	Indian Wells, United States	Hard	QF	7–6^{(9–7)}, 7–6^{(10–8)}	3
20.	(Czech Republic) Tomáš Berdych	9	US Open, New York, United States	Hard	4R	7–6^{(8–6)}, 2–0 ret.	5
21.	(Russia) Nikolay Davydenko	4	Tennis Masters Cup, Shanghai, China	Hard (i)	RR	6–3, 4-6, 6-2	5
22.	(Chile) Fernando González	7	Tennis Masters Cup, Shanghai, China	Hard (i)	RR	6–1, 6–4	5
2008
23.	(Spain) Rafael Nadal	2	Dubai, United Arab Emirates	Hard	QF	7–6^{(7–5)}, 6–2	6
24.	(Serbia) Novak Djokovic	3	Dubai, United Arab Emirates	Hard	SF	7–6^{(7–5)}, 6–3	6
25.	(Switzerland) Roger Federer	**1**	Miami, United States	Hard	QF	7–6^{(7–4)}, 4–6, 6–3	6
26.	(France) Gilles Simon	10	Paris, France	Hard (i)	3R	6–3, 7–5	7
2009
27.	(Serbia) Novak Djokovic	3	Australian Open, Melbourne, Australia	Hard	QF	6–7^{(3–7)}, 6–4, 6–2, 2–1 ret.	9
28.	(Serbia) Novak Djokovic	3	Indian Wells, United States	Hard	QF	6–3, 6–2	7
29.	(France) Gaël Monfils	10	Miami, United States	Hard	4R	7–6^{(7–2)}, 6–4	6
30.	(United Kingdom) Andy Murray	3	Wimbledon, London, England	Grass	SF	6–4, 4–6, 7–6^{(9–7)}, 7–6^{(7–5)}	6
31.	(Serbia) Novak Djokovic	4	Montreal, Canada	Hard	QF	6–4, 7–6^{(7–4)}	5
2010
32.	(Sweden) Robin Söderling	7	Indian Wells, United States	Hard	SF	6–4, 3–6, 6–3	8
33.	(Spain) Rafael Nadal	4	Miami, United States	Hard	SF	4–6, 6–3, 6–3	8
34.	(Sweden) Robin Söderling	5	Cincinnati, United States	Hard	3R	6–4, 6–7^{(7–9)}, 7–6^{(7–5)}	13
35.	(Serbia) Novak Djokovic	3	Cincinnati, United States	Hard	QF	6–4, 7–5	13
2011
36.	(Spain) David Ferrer	5	US Open, New York, United States	Hard	4R	6–3, 6–4, 3–6, 6–3	21
2012
37.	(Switzerland) Roger Federer	3	Miami, United States	Hard	3R	7–6^{(7–4)}, 1–6, 6–4	34

== National participation ==
=== Team competition: 2 (1–1) ===
Outcome	No.	Date	Tournament	Surface	Partner	Opponents	Score
Runner-up	1.	December 3–5, 2004	Davis Cup, Seville, Spain	Clay (i)	(United States) Bob Bryan (United States) Mike Bryan (United States) Mardy Fish	(Spain) Juan Carlos Ferrero (Spain) Carlos Moyá (Spain) Rafael Nadal (Spain) Tommy Robredo	2–3
Winner	1.	November 30 – December 2, 2007	Davis Cup, Portland, United States	Hard (i)	(United States) Bob Bryan (United States) Mike Bryan (United States) James Blake	(Russia) Nikolay Davydenko (Russia) Mikhail Youzhny (Russia) Igor Andreev (Russia) Dmitry Tursunov	4–1

=== Davis Cup (33–12) ===
Group membership World Group (28–11) WG Play-offs (5–1)	Matches by surface Hard (19–3) Clay (8–9) Grass (4–0) Carpet (2–0)	Matches by type Singles (33–12) Doubles (0–0)	Matches by setting Indoors (20–5) Outdoors (13–7)	Matches by venue United States (22–3) Away (11–9)

Rd	Date	Opponent nation	Score	Venue	Surface	Match	Opponent player(s)	Rubber score
2001
1R	Feb 9–11, 2001	Switzerland	2–3	Basel	Hard (i)	Singles 5 (dead)	George Bastl	6–3, 6–4
Q1	Oct 12–14, 2001	India	4–1	Winston-Salem	Hard (i)	Singles 1	Harsh Mankad	6–3, 6–4, 6–1
Q1	Oct 12–14, 2001	India	4–1	Winston-Salem	Hard (i)	Singles 4	Leander Paes	4–6, 6–3, 6–2, 7–5
2002
1R	Feb 8–10, 2002	Slovakia	5–0	Oklahoma City	Hard (i)	Singles 2	Ján Krošlák	6–4, 6–4, 6–7^{(5–7)}, 7–6^{(7–1)}
1R	Feb 8–10, 2002	Slovakia	5–0	Oklahoma City	Hard (i)	Singles 5 (dead)	Karol Beck	6–4, 7–6^{(7–5)}
QF	Apr 5–7, 2002	Spain	3–1	Houston	Grass	Singles 1	Tommy Robredo	6–3, 7–5, 7–6^{(9–7)}
QF	Apr 5–7, 2002	Spain	3–1	Houston	Grass	Singles 4	Alberto Martín	6–2, 6–4, 6–2
SF	Sep 20–22, 2002	France	2–3	Paris	Clay	Singles 1	Arnaud Clément	6–4, 6–7^{(6–8)}, 6–7^{(5–7)}, 1–6
SF	Sep 20–22, 2002	France	2–3	Paris	Clay	Singles 4	Sébastien Grosjean	4–6, 6–3, 3–6, 4–6
2003
PO	Sep 19–21, 2003	Slovakia	3–2	Bratislava	Clay	Singles 1	Dominik Hrbatý	6–3, 3–6, 4–6, 4–6
PO	Sep 19–21, 2003	Slovakia	3–2	Bratislava	Clay	Singles 4	Karol Beck	6–3, 6–4, 6–4
2004
1R	Feb 6–8, 2004	Austria	5–0	Uncasville	Hard (i)	Singles 2	Stefan Koubek	6–4, 6–4, 6–2
1R	Feb 6–8, 2004	Austria	5–0	Uncasville	Hard (i)	Singles 4 (dead)	Jürgen Melzer	6–4, 6–2
QF	Apr 9–11, 2004	Sweden	4–1	Delray Beach	Hard	Singles 2	Thomas Enqvist	6–4, 7–5, 6–2
QF	Apr 9–11, 2004	Sweden	4–1	Delray Beach	Hard	Singles 4	Jonas Björkman	7–6^{(7–4)}, 6–4, 6–0
SF	Sep 24–26, 2004	Belarus	4–0	Charleston	Hard	Singles 1	Vladimir Voltchkov	6–1, 6–4, 6–4
SF	Sep 24–26, 2004	Belarus	4–0	Charleston	Hard	Singles 4 (dead)	Alexander Skrypko	6–4, 6–2
F	Dec 3–5, 2004	Spain	2–3	Seville	Clay (i)	Singles 2	Rafael Nadal	7–6^{(8–6)}, 2–6, 6–7^{(6–8)}, 2–6
F	Dec 3–5, 2004	Spain	2–3	Seville	Clay (i)	Singles 4	Carlos Moyá	2–6, 6–7^{(1–7)}, 6–7^{(5–7)}
2005
1R	Mar 4–6, 2005	Croatia	2–3	Los Angeles	Hard	Singles 2	Mario Ančić	4–6, 6–2, 6–1, 6–4
1R	Mar 4–6, 2005	Croatia	2–3	Los Angeles	Hard	Singles 4	Ivan Ljubičić	6–4, 3–6, 6–7^{(11–13)}, 7–6^{(9–7)}, 2–6
PO	Sep 23–25, 2005	Belgium	4–1	Leuven	Clay (i)	Singles 2	Christophe Rochus	6–1, 6–2, 6–3
PO	Sep 23–25, 2005	Belgium	4–1	Leuven	Clay (i)	Singles 4	Olivier Rochus	6–7^{(4–7)}, 7–6^{(7–4)}, 7–6^{(7–5)}, 4–6, 6–3
2006
1R	Feb 10–12, 2006	Romania	4–1	La Jolla	Hard	Singles 1	Andrei Pavel	7–6^{(7–2)}, 6–2, 6–7^{(8–10)}, 2–6, 4–6
1R	Feb 10–12, 2006	Romania	4–1	La Jolla	Hard	Singles 4	Răzvan Sabău	6–3, 6–3, 6–2
QF	Apr 7–9, 2006	Chile	3–2	Rancho Mirage	Grass	Singles 2	Nicolás Massú	6–3, 7–6^{(7–5)}, 7–6^{(7–5)}
QF	Apr 7–9, 2006	Chile	3–2	Rancho Mirage	Grass	Singles 4	Fernando González	4–6, 7–5, 6–3, 6–2
SF	Sep 22–24, 2006	Russia	2–3	Moscow	Clay (i)	Singles 1	Marat Safin	4–6, 3–6, 6–7^{(5–7)}
SF	Sep 22–24, 2006	Russia	2–3	Moscow	Clay (i)	Singles 4	Dmitry Tursunov	3–6, 4–6, 7–5, 6–3, 15–17
2007
1R	Feb 9–11, 2007	Czech Republic	4–1	Ostrava	Clay (i)	Singles 1	Ivo Minář	6–4, 4–6, 6–2, 6–3
1R	Feb 9–11, 2007	Czech Republic	4–1	Ostrava	Clay (i)	Singles 4	Tomáš Berdych	4–6, 6–3, 6–2, 7–6^{(7–4)}
QF	Apr 6–8, 2007	Spain	4–1	Winston-Salem	Hard (i)	Singles 2	Fernando Verdasco	7–6^{(7–5)}, 6–1, 6–4
SF	Sep 21–23, 2007	Sweden	4–1	Gothenburg	Carpet (i)	Singles 1	Joachim Johansson	7–6^{(7–4)}, 7–6^{(7–3)}, 6–3
SF	Sep 21–23, 2007	Sweden	4–1	Gothenburg	Carpet (i)	Singles 4	Jonas Björkman	6–2, 7–6^{(7–3)}, 6–4
F	Nov 30–Dec 2, 2007	Russia	4–1	Portland	Hard (i)	Singles 1	Dmitry Tursunov	6–4, 6–4, 6–2
2008
1R	Feb 8–10, 2008	Austria	4–1	Vienna	Clay (i)	Singles 1	Jürgen Melzer	6–4, 4–6, 6–3, 6–7^{(4–7)}, 6–3
QF	Apr 11–13, 2008	France	4–1	Winston-Salem	Hard (i)	Singles 1	Michaël Llodra	6–4, 7–6^{(7–3)}, 7–6^{(7–5)}
QF	Apr 11–13, 2008	France	4–1	Winston-Salem	Hard (i)	Singles 4	Paul-Henri Mathieu	6–2, 6–3, 6–2
SF	Sep 19–21, 2008	Spain	1–4	Madrid	Clay	Singles 2	David Ferrer	6–7^{(5–7)}, 6–2, 6–1, 4–6, 6–8
SF	Sep 19–21, 2008	Spain	1–4	Madrid	Clay	Singles 4	Rafael Nadal	4–6, 0–6, 4–6
2009
1R	Mar 6–8, 2009	Switzerland	4–1	Birmingham	Hard (i)	Singles 2	Marco Chiudinelli	6–1, 6–3, 7–6^{(7–5)}
1R	Mar 6–8, 2009	Switzerland	4–1	Birmingham	Hard (i)	Singles 4	Stan Wawrinka	6–4, 6–4, 6–2
2011
1R	Mar 4–6, 2011	Chile	4–1	Santiago	Clay	Singles 1	Nicolás Massú	6–2, 4–6, 6–3, 6–4
1R	Mar 4–6, 2011	Chile	4–1	Santiago	Clay	Singles 4	Paul Capdeville	3–6, 7–6^{(7–2)}, 6–3, 6–3
QF	Jul 8–10, 2011	Spain	1–3	Austin	Hard (i)	Singles 2	David Ferrer	6–7^{(9–11)}, 5–7, 3–6

== Grand Slam titles details ==
1	2003 US Open	
Round	Opponent	Score
1R	(United Kingdom) Tim Henman	6–3, 7–6^{(7–2)}, 6–3
2R	(Croatia) Ivan Ljubičić	6–3, 6–7^{(4–7)} 6–3, 7–6^{(10–8)}
3R	(Brazil) Flávio Saretta	6–1, 6–3, 6–3
4R	(Belgium) Xavier Malisse	6–3, 6–4, 7–6^{(7–5)}
QF	(Netherlands) Sjeng Schalken	6–4, 6–2, 6–3
SF	(Argentina) David Nalbandian	6–7^{(4–7)}, 3–6, 7–6^{(9–7)}, 6–1, 6–3
W	(Spain) Juan Carlos Ferrero	6–3, 7–6^{(7–2)}, 6–3

== ATP Tour career earnings ==
Year	Grand Slam singles titles	ATP singles titles	Total singles titles	Earnings	Money list rank
2001	0	3	3	$746,504	23
2002	0	2	2	$1,060,878	16
2003	1	5	6	$3,227,342	2
2004	0	4	4	$2,604,590	3
2005	0	5	5	$1,798,635	4
2006	0	1	1	$2,214,890	3
2007	0	2	2	$1,532,070	6
2008	0	3	3	$1,337,888	8
2009	0	1	1	$2,478,719	7
2010	0	2	2	$1,917,612	10
2011	0	1	1	$1,061,404	20
2012	0	2	2	$549,286	50
Career	1	31	32	$20,640,030	20

* Statistics correct as of 3 January 2021.

== Career Grand Slam seedings ==
The tournaments won by Roddick are in boldface, while those where he was runner-up are italicized.

Year	Australian Open	French Open	Wimbledon	US Open
2000	did not play	did not play	did not play	wildcard
2001	did not play	not seeded	not seeded	18th
2002	13th	13th	11th	11th
2003	9th	6th	5th	**4th**
2004	1st	2nd	2nd	2nd
2005	2nd	2nd	2nd	4th
2006	2nd	5th	3rd	9th
2007	6th	3rd	3rd	5th
2008	6th	did not play	6th	8th
2009	7th	6th	6th	5th
2010	7th	6th	5th	9th
2011	8th	did not play	8th	21st
2012	15th	26th	30th	20th

== Notable exhibitions ==
=== Team competitions ===
Result	No.	Tournament	Surface	Team	Partners	Opponent team	Opponent players	Score
Loss	Jan 2010	Hit for Haiti, Melbourne, Australia	Hard	Team Blue	(Spain) Rafael Nadal (Serbia) Novak Djokovic (Belgium) Kim Clijsters (Australia) Bernard Tomic (S)	Team Red	(Switzerland) Roger Federer (Australia) Lleyton Hewitt (United States) Serena Williams (Australia) Samantha Stosur (S)	6–7
