= 2004 Stella Artois Championships – Doubles =

Doubles
- 2004 Stella Artois Championships

Final
- Champions: (United States) Bob Bryan; (United States) Mike Bryan
- Runners-up: (The Bahamas) Mark Knowles; (Canada) Daniel Nestor
- Score: 6–4, 6–4

Details
- Draw: 24

Events
| Singles | Doubles |
| ← 2003 · | Queen's Club Championships | · 2005 → |

Mark Knowles and Daniel Nestor were the defending champions.

Bob Bryan and Mike Bryan won in the final 6–4, 6–4, against Knowles and Nestor.

== Seeds ==
All seeds receive a bye into the second round.

1. (United States) Bob Bryan / (United States) Mike Bryan (champions)
2. (The Bahamas) Mark Knowles / (Canada) Daniel Nestor (final)
3. (Australia) Wayne Arthurs / (Australia) Paul Hanley (semifinals)
4. (Zimbabwe) Wayne Black / (Zimbabwe) Kevin Ullyett (quarterfinals)
5. (Belarus) Max Mirnyi / (Serbia and Montenegro) Nenad Zimonjić (semifinals)
6. (Argentina) Gastón Etlis / (Argentina) Martín Rodríguez (second round)
7. (Czech Republic) František Čermák / (Czech Republic) Leoš Friedl (second round)
8. (Italy) Massimo Bertolini / (South Africa) Robbie Koenig (second round)

== Draw ==
=== Key ===
- Q = Qualifier
- WC = Wild card
- LL = Lucky loser
- Alt = Alternate
- SE = Special exempt
- PR = Protected ranking
- ITF = ITF entry
- JE = Junior exempt
- w/o = Walkover
- r = Retired
- d = Defaulted
- SR = Special ranking

=== Finals ===
Semifinals

Final

1
- (United States) Bob Bryan
- (United States) Mike Bryan
6
7^{12}

5
- (Belarus) Max Mirnyi
- (Serbia and Montenegro) Nenad Zimonjić
4
6^{10}

1
- (United States) Bob Bryan
- (United States) Mike Bryan
6
6

2
- (The Bahamas) Mark Knowles
- (Canada) Daniel Nestor
4
4

3
- (Australia) Wayne Arthurs
- (Australia) Paul Hanley
6^{4}
7^{7}
5

2
- (The Bahamas) Mark Knowles
- (Canada) Daniel Nestor
7^{7}
6^{5}
7

=== Top half ===
First round

Second round

Quarterfinals

Semifinals

1
- (United States) B Bryan
- (United States) M Bryan
7
6^{3}
7^{7}

- (Brazil) A Sá
- (United States) J Thomas
3
5

- (Croatia) M Ančić
- (Croatia) G Ivanišević
5
7^{7}
6^{5}

- (Croatia) M Ančić
- (Croatia) G Ivanišević
6
7

1
- (United States) B Bryan
- (United States) M Bryan
7^{10}
2
6

WC
- (United Kingdom) M Hilton
- (United Kingdom) J Marray
5
5

- (France) J Benneteau
- (France) N Mahut
6^{8}
6
4

- (France) J Benneteau
- (France) N Mahut
7
7

- (France) J Benneteau
- (France) N Mahut
7^{7}
7^{7}

6
- (Argentina) G Etlis
- (Argentina) M Rodríguez
6^{5}
6^{4}

1
- (United States) B Bryan
- (United States) M Bryan
6
7^{12}

5
- (Belarus) M Mirnyi
- (Serbia and Montenegro) N Zimonjić
4
6^{10}

4
- (Zimbabwe) W Black
- (Zimbabwe) K Ullyett
6
6

- (Czech Republic) R Štěpánek
- (South Africa) M Wakefield
3
4

- (Australia) J Kerr
- (Belgium) T Vanhoudt
4
3

- (Australia) J Kerr
- (Belgium) T Vanhoudt
6
6

4
- (Zimbabwe) W Black
- (Zimbabwe) K Ullyett
3
4

- (United States) R Leach
- (United States) B MacPhie
7^{7}
6

5
- (Belarus) M Mirnyi
- (Serbia and Montenegro) N Zimonjić
6
6

WC
- (United Kingdom) D Kiernan
- (United Kingdom) D Sherwood
6^{5}
3

- (United States) R Leach
- (United States) B MacPhie
7^{7}
4
6^{4}

5
- (Belarus) M Mirnyi
- (Serbia and Montenegro) N Zimonjić
6^{3}
6
7^{7}

=== Bottom half ===
First round

Second round

Quarterfinals

Semifinals

7
- (Czech Republic) F Čermák
- (Czech Republic) L Friedl
6^{3}
6^{6}

- (United States) S Humphries
- (Thailand) P Srichaphan
5
4

- (South Africa) J Coetzee
- (South Africa) C Haggard
7^{7}
7^{8}

- (South Africa) J Coetzee
- (South Africa) C Haggard
7
6

- (South Africa) J Coetzee
- (South Africa) C Haggard
6^{3}
4

- (United States) A Agassi
- (United States) A Roddick
6
6

3
- (Australia) W Arthurs
- (Australia) P Hanley
7^{7}
6

- (United States) R Ginepri
- (The Bahamas) M Merklein
2
2

- (United States) A Agassi
- (United States) A Roddick
4
6^{6}

3
- (Australia) W Arthurs
- (Australia) P Hanley
6
7^{8}

3
- (Australia) W Arthurs
- (Australia) P Hanley
6^{4}
7^{7}
5

2
- (The Bahamas) M Knowles
- (Canada) D Nestor
7^{7}
6^{5}
7

8
- (Italy) M Bertolini
- (South Africa) R Koenig
3
4

- (United States) J-M Gambill
- (Australia) M Hill
3
4

Alt
- (South Africa) R de Voest
- (South Africa) W Moodie
6
6

Alt
- (South Africa) R de Voest
- (South Africa) W Moodie
6
6

Alt
- (South Africa) R de Voest
- (South Africa) W Moodie
6^{5}
2

- (Spain) JI Carrasco
- (Czech Republic) D Škoch
1
0

2
- (The Bahamas) M Knowles
- (Canada) D Nestor
7^{7}
6

- (France) R Gasquet
- (France) S Grosjean
6
6

- (France) R Gasquet
- (France) S Grosjean
4
6
2

2
- (The Bahamas) M Knowles
- (Canada) D Nestor
6
4
6
