= 2007 Artois Championships – Singles =

Singles
- 2007 Artois Championships

Final
- Champion: (United States) Andy Roddick
- Runner-up: (France) Nicolas Mahut
- Score: 4–6, 7–6^{(9–7)}, 7–6^{(7–2)}

Details
- Draw: 56
- Seeds: 16

Events
Singles	Doubles
- Queen's Club Championships

Lleyton Hewitt was the defending champion, but lost to qualifier Jo-Wilfried Tsonga in the second round.

Andy Roddick won the title, defeating Nicolas Mahut 4–6, 7–6^{(9–7)}, 7–6^{(7–2)} in the final.

== Seeds ==
The top eight seeds receive a bye into the second round.

1. (Spain) Rafael Nadal (quarterfinals)
2. (United States) Andy Roddick (champion)
3. (Chile) Fernando González (quarterfinals)
4. (Serbia) Novak Djokovic (third round)
5. (Croatia) Ivan Ljubičić (third round)
6. (Australia) Lleyton Hewitt (second round)
7. (Russia) Dmitry Tursunov (semifinals)
8. (Russia) Marat Safin (third round)
9. (United States) Mardy Fish (first round)
10. (France) Julien Benneteau (first round)
11. (Sweden) Jonas Björkman (second round)
12. (France) Paul-Henri Mathieu (third round)
13. (South Korea) Lee Hyung-taik (first round)
14. (France) Arnaud Clément (semifinals)
15. (United States) Robby Ginepri (third round)
16. (Spain) Fernando Verdasco (first round)

== Draw ==
=== Finals ===
Quarterfinals
1	(Spain) Rafael Nadal	5	6^{0}
(France) Nicolas Mahut	7	7^{7}
14	(France) Arnaud Clément	7	6
(Croatia) Ivo Karlović	5	4
7	(Russia) Dmitry Tursunov	6	6^{5}	6
3	(Chile) Fernando González	3	7^{7}	4
WC	(Croatia) Marin Čilić	4	6^{5}
2	(United States) Andy Roddick	6	7^{7}

Semifinals
(France) Nicolas Mahut	6	7^{7}
14	(France) Arnaud Clément	3	6^{4}
7	(Russia) Dmitry Tursunov	4	5
2	(United States) Andy Roddick	6	7

Final
(France) Nicolas Mahut	6	6^{7}	6^{2}
2	(United States) Andy Roddick	4	7^{9}	7^{7}

=== Top half ===
==== Section 1 ====
First round
(Argentina) JM del Potro	6	6
(Sweden) T Johansson	2	4
(France) G Monfils	6	6
WC	(Russia) I Andreev	3	4
(Belarus) M Mirnyi	6	6
16	(Spain) F Verdasco	3	3
11	(Sweden) J Björkman	6	3	6
(United States) J Gimelstob	3	6	1
(France) N Mahut	6	6
(Russia) I Kunitsyn	4	4
(Spain) Ó Hernández	2	3
(Thailand) D Udomchoke	6	6

Second round
1	(Spain) R Nadal	6	6
(Argentina) JM del Potro	4	4
(France) G Monfils	6^{2}	6	5
(Belarus) M Mirnyi	7^{7}	2	7
11	(Sweden) J Björkman	3	7^{7}	3
(France) N Mahut	6	6^{2}	6
(Thailand) D Udomchoke	3	4
5	(Croatia) I Ljubičić	6	6

Third round
1	(Spain) R Nadal	7^{7}	6
(Belarus) M Mirnyi	6^{3}	3
(France) N Mahut	7^{7}	6
5	(Croatia) I Ljubičić	6^{3}	3

Quarterfinals
1	(Spain) R Nadal	5	6^{0}
(France) N Mahut	7	7^{7}

==== Section 2 ====
First round
(Latvia) E Gulbis	6^{5}	6^{8}
(United States) R Kendrick	7^{7}	7^{10}
(Australia) C Guccione	7^{7}	6
(Italy) A Seppi	6^{4}	4
(Spain) I Pastor	6^{2}	4
14	(France) A Clément	7^{7}	6
9	(United States) M Fish	3	4
(Croatia) I Karlović	6	6
Q	(United States) A Kuznetsov	7	6
Q	(Denmark) F Nielsen	5	3
(Germany) M Berrer	4	2
(France) S Grosjean	6	6

Second round
4	(Serbia) N Djokovic	3	6	6
(United States) R Kendrick	6	3	2
(Australia) C Guccione	4	4
14	(France) A Clément	6	6
(Croatia) I Karlović	2	6	7^{7}
Q	(United States) A Kuznetsov	6	2	6^{2}
(France) S Grosjean	6	4	4
8	(Russia) M Safin	3	6	6

Third round
4	(Serbia) N Djokovic	6	3	4
14	(France) A Clément	2	6	6
(Croatia) I Karlović	7^{7}	7^{7}
8	(Russia) M Safin	6^{3}	6^{4}

Quarterfinals
14	(France) A Clément	7	6
(Croatia) I Karlović	5	4

=== Bottom half ===
==== Section 3 ====
First round
(Canada) F Dancevic	6	6^{5}	6
(Argentina) S Roitman	3	7^{7}	1
(Chinese Taipei) Lu Y-H	1	1
(France) M Llodra	6	6
(Spain) F López	3	7^{7}	3
12	(France) PH Mathieu	6	6^{5}	6
15	(United States) R Ginepri	6	6
WC	(United Kingdom) R Bloomfield	4	2
(United States) A Delic	7^{7}	4	4
(France) F Serra	6^{5}	6	6
(Serbia) J Tipsarević	4	6	7
Q	(Serbia) D Vemić	6	3	5

Second round
7	(Russia) D Tursunov	7	6
(Canada) F Dancevic	5	1
(France) M Llodra	6^{4}	r
12	(France) PH Mathieu	7^{7}
15	(United States) R Ginepri	6	7^{7}
(France) F Serra	4	6^{3}
(Serbia) J Tipsarević	6^{7}	6	6^{7}
3	(Chile) F González	7^{9}	4	7^{9}

Third round
7	(Russia) D Tursunov	7^{7}	3	6
12	(France) PH Mathieu	6^{3}	6	3
15	(United States) R Ginepri	2	5
3	(Chile) F González	6	7

Quarterfinals
7	(Russia) D Tursunov	6	6^{5}	6
3	(Chile) F González	3	7^{7}	4

==== Section 4 ====
First round
Q	(France) JW Tsonga	7^{7}	6
(Denmark) K Pless	6^{2}	0
WC	(Croatia) M Čilić	7^{7}	2	6
(United Kingdom) T Henman	6^{5}	6	4
(Colombia) A Falla	7	6
10	(France) J Benneteau	5	3
13	(South Korea) Lee H-T	4	4
WC	(United Kingdom) A Bogdanovic	6	6
WC	(United Kingdom) J Baker	3	7^{7}	6
(Austria) A Peya	6	6^{5}	3
(Czech Republic) R Štěpánek	6	2
(Italy) D Sanguinetti	2	0^{r}

Second round
6	(Australia) L Hewitt	6^{5}	6^{2}
Q	(France) JW Tsonga	7^{7}	7^{7}
WC	(Croatia) M Čilić	6	6
(Colombia) A Falla	3	4
WC	(United Kingdom) A Bogdanovic	4	7^{7}	6
WC	(United Kingdom) J Baker	6	6^{4}	3
(Czech Republic) R Štěpánek	4	4
2	(United States) A Roddick	6	6

Third round
Q	(France) JW Tsonga	6	3	2
WC	(Croatia) M Čilić	4	6	6
WC	(United Kingdom) A Bogdanovic	6	6^{5}	4
2	(United States) A Roddick	4	7^{7}	6

Quarterfinals
WC	(Croatia) M Čilić	4	6^{5}
2	(United States) A Roddick	6	7^{7}
