= 2001 Davis Cup World Group qualifying round =

The 2001 Davis Cup World Group qualifying round was held from 21 September to 14 October. They were the main play-offs of the 2001 Davis Cup. The winners of the playoffs advanced to the 2002 Davis Cup World Group, and the losers were relegated to their respective Zonal Regions I.

== Teams ==
Bold indicates team had qualified for the 2001 Davis Cup World Group.

From World Group

- Belgium
- **Czech Republic**
- Ecuador
- **Morocco**
- Romania
- **Slovakia**
- **Spain**
- **United States**

From Americas Group I

- **Argentina**
- Chile

From Asia/Oceania Group I

- India
- Uzbekistan

From Europe/Africa Group I

- Belarus
- **Croatia**
- **Great Britain**
- Italy

== Results summary ==
Date: 21–23 September; 12–14 October

The eight losing teams in the World Group first round ties and eight winners of the Zonal Group I final round ties competed in the World Group qualifying round for spots in the 2002 World Group.

Home team	Score	Visiting team	Location	Venue	Door	Surface	Ref.
**Argentina**	5–0	Belarus	Córdoba	Córdoba Lawn Tennis Club	Outdoor	Clay	
Belgium	2–3	**Morocco**	Liège	Country Hall Liège	Indoor	Carpet	
**Czech Republic**	3–2	Romania	Prostějov	Sports Hall	Indoor	Carpet	
Ecuador	1–4	**Great Britain**	Guayaquil	Club Nacional	Outdoor	Clay	
Italy	2–3	**Croatia**	Rome	Foro Italico	Outdoor	Clay	
**Slovakia**	3–2	Chile	Prešov	Mestská hala	Indoor	Carpet	
**Spain**	4–0	Uzbekistan	Albacete	Tennis Club de Albacete	Outdoor	Clay	
**United States**	4–1	India	Winston-Salem, NC	Lawrence Joel Colisseum	Indoor	Hard	

- Czech Republic, Morocco, Slovakia, Spain and United States remain in the World Group in 2002.
- Argentina, Croatia and Great Britain are promoted to the World Group in 2002.
- Belarus, Chile, Italy, India and Uzbekistan remain in Zonal Group I in 2002.
- Belgium, Ecuador and Romania are relegated to Zonal Group I in 2002.

== Playoff results ==
=== Argentina vs. Belarus ===
Argentina
5
Córdoba Lawn Tennis Club, Córdoba, Argentina
21–23 September 2001
Clay

Belarus
0

			1	2	3	4	5
1	(Argentina) (Belarus)	**Franco Squillari**; Vladimir Voltchkov	**6**; 2	**6**; 4	**6**; 3
2	(Argentina) (Belarus)	**Gastón Gaudio**; Max Mirnyi	4; **6**	**6**; 3	**6**; 1	**6**; 3
3	(Argentina) (Belarus)	**Guillermo Cañas / Luis Lobo**; Max Mirnyi / Vladimir Voltchkov	6^{7} **7^{9}**	**7^{7}** 6^{5}	**7^{7}** 6^{3}	4; **6**	**6**; 4
4	(Argentina) (Belarus)	**Franco Squillari**; Alexander Shvets	**6**; 3	**6**; 3
5	(Argentina) (Belarus)	**Gastón Gaudio**; Alexander Skrypko	**6**; 2	**6**; 0

=== Belgium vs. Morocco ===
Belgium
2
Country Hall, Liège, Belgium
21–23 September 2001
Carpet (indoors)

Morocco
3

			1	2	3	4	5
1	(Belgium) (Morocco)	Olivier Rochus; **Hicham Arazi**	**6**; 2	3; **6**	1; **6**	**7**; 5	3; **6**
2	(Belgium) (Morocco)	Xavier Malisse; **Younes El Aynaoui**	3; **6**	4; **6**	4; **6**
3	(Belgium) (Morocco)	**Christophe Rochus / Tom Vanhoudt**; Karim Alami / Younes El Aynaoui	**6**; 3	**6**; 2	3; **6**	5; **7**	**6**; 2
4	(Belgium) (Morocco)	**Xavier Malisse**; Hicham Arazi	4; **6**	**7^{7}** 6^{2}	**7**; 5	**6**; 4
5	(Belgium) (Morocco)	Christophe Rochus; **Younes El Aynaoui**	3; **6**	4; **6**	**7**; 5	6^{4} **7^{7}**

=== Czech Republic vs. Romania ===
Czech Republic
3
Sports Hall, Prostějov, Czech Republic
21–23 September 2001
Carpet (indoors)

Romania
2

			1	2	3	4	5
1	(Czech Republic) (Romania)	Bohdan Ulihrach; **Adrian Voinea**	**6**; 2	3; **6**	**7**; 5	4; **6**	5; **7**
2	(Czech Republic) (Romania)	**Jiří Novák**; Andrei Pavel	**6**; 3	**7**; 5	**6**; 3
3	(Czech Republic) (Romania)	**Jiří Novák / David Rikl**; Victor Hănescu / Gabriel Trifu	**7^{7}** 6^{3}	**7^{7}** 6^{5}	**6**; 4
4	(Czech Republic) (Romania)	**Bohdan Ulihrach**; Gabriel Trifu	**7**; 5	**6**; 4	**6**; 4
5	(Czech Republic) (Romania)	Michal Tabara; **Adrian Voinea**	1; **6**	4; **6**

=== Ecuador vs. Great Britain ===
Ecuador
1
Club Nacional, Guayaquil, Ecuador
21–23 September 2001
Clay

Great Britain
4

			1	2	3	4	5
1	(Ecuador) (United Kingdom)	Nicolás Lapentti; **Greg Rusedski**	**6**; 2	2; **6**	5; **7**	3; **6**
2	(Ecuador) (United Kingdom)	Luis Morejón; **Tim Henman**	4; **6**	2; **6**	2; **6**
3	(Ecuador) (United Kingdom)	Giovanni Lapentti / Nicolás Lapentti; **Tim Henman / Greg Rusedski**	2; **6**	3; **6**	4; **6**
4	(Ecuador) (United Kingdom)	Giovanni Lapentti; **Martin Lee**	0; **6**	4; **6**
5	(Ecuador) (United Kingdom)	**Luis Morejón**; Barry Cowan	**6**; 1	**6**; 4

=== Italy vs. Croatia ===
Italy
2
Foro Italico, Rome, Italy
21–23 September 2001
Clay

Croatia
3

			1	2	3	4	5
1	(Italy) (Croatia)	**Filippo Volandri**; Goran Ivanišević	**6**; 2	**7^{7}** 6^{4}	3; **6**	0; **6**	**6**; 4
2	(Italy) (Croatia)	Federico Luzzi; **Ivan Ljubičić**	4; **6**	2; **6**	1; **6**
3	(Italy) (Croatia)	Giorgio Galimberti / Mosé Navarra; **Goran Ivanišević / Ivan Ljubičić**	**7^{8}** 6^{6}	**6**; 3	6^{5} **7^{7}**	2; **6**	4; **6**
4	(Italy) (Croatia)	Federico Luzzi; **Goran Ivanišević**	6^{4} **7^{7}**	3; **6**	4; **6**
5	(Italy) (Croatia)	**Filippo Volandri**; Ivan Vajda	**6**; 2	**6**; 4

=== Slovakia vs. Chile ===
Slovakia
3
Mestská hala, Prešov, Slovakia
21–23 September 2001
Carpet (indoors)

Chile
2

			1	2	3	4	5
1	(Slovakia) (Chile)	Karol Kučera; **Marcelo Ríos**	3; **6**	2; **6**	3; **6**
2	(Slovakia) (Chile)	**Dominik Hrbatý**; Nicolás Massú	**6**; 1	**6**; 1	4; **6**	**6**; 3
3	(Slovakia) (Chile)	**Dominik Hrbatý / Ján Krošlák**; Fernando González / Nicolás Massú	**6**; 3	**7^{7}** 6^{4}	4; **6**	**6**; 3
4	(Slovakia) (Chile)	**Dominik Hrbatý**; Marcelo Ríos	2; **6**	4; **6**	**6**; 2	**6**; 4	**6**; 2
5	(Slovakia) (Chile)	Ján Krošlák; **Nicolás Massú**	2; **6**	**7**; 5	3; **6**

=== Spain vs. Uzbekistan ===
Spain
4
Tennis Club de Albacete, Albacete, Spain
21–23 September 2001
Clay

Uzbekistan
0

			1	2	3	4	5
1	(Spain) (Uzbekistan)	**Juan Carlos Ferrero**; Oleg Ogorodov	**7**; 5	**6**; 2	**6**; 4
2	(Spain) (Uzbekistan)	**Àlex Corretja**; Vadim Kutsenko	**6**; 0	**6**; 2	6^{4} **7^{7}**	**6**; 0
3	(Spain) (Uzbekistan)	**Joan Balcells / Àlex Corretja**; Vadim Kutsenko / Oleg Ogorodov	5; **7**	**6**; 3	**6**; 4	**6**; 4
4	(Spain) (Uzbekistan)	**Joan Balcells**; Vadim Kutsenko	**6**; 4	**7^{7}** 6^{4}
5	(Spain) (Uzbekistan)	Àlex Corretja; Oleg Ogorodov						**not** **played**

=== United States vs. India ===
United States
4
Lawrence Joel Veterans Memorial Coliseum, Winston-Salem, NC, United States
12–14 October 2001
Hard (indoors)

India
1

			1	2	3	4	5
1	(United States) (India)	**Andy Roddick**; Harsh Mankad	**6**; 3	**6**; 4	**6**; 1
2	(United States) (India)	**James Blake**; Leander Paes	**7**; 5	**6**; 3	**6**; 3
3	(United States) (India)	Donald Johnson / Jared Palmer; **Mahesh Bhupathi / Leander Paes**	4; **6**	**6**; 1	3; **6**	6^{6} **7^{8}**
4	(United States) (India)	**Andy Roddick**; Leander Paes	4; **6**	**6**; 3	**6**; 2	**7**; 5
5	(United States) (India)	**James Blake**; Harsh Mankad	**6**; 3	**6**; 0
