= 2007 Artois Championships – Doubles =

Doubles
- 2007 Artois Championships

Final
- Champions: (The Bahamas) Mark Knowles (Canada) Daniel Nestor
- Runners-up: (United States) Bob Bryan (United States) Mike Bryan
- Score: 7–6^{(7–4)}, 7–5

Details
- Draw: 24

Events
Singles	Doubles
← 2006 ·	Artois Championships	· 2008 →

Paul Hanley and Kevin Ullyett were the defending champions, but lost in the semifinals this year.

Mark Knowles and Daniel Nestor won the title, defeating Bob Bryan and Mike Bryan 7–6^{(7–4)}, 7–5 in the final.

== Seeds ==
All seeds receive a bye into the second round.

1. (United States) Bob Bryan / (United States) Mike Bryan (final)
2. (Sweden) Jonas Björkman / (Belarus) Max Mirnyi (semifinals)
3. (Australia) Paul Hanley / (Zimbabwe) Kevin Ullyett (semifinals)
4. (The Bahamas) Mark Knowles / (Canada) Daniel Nestor (champions)
5. ~~(France) Arnaud Clément / (France) Michaël Llodra~~ (withdrew due to leg injury of Llodra)
6. (Czech Republic) Jaroslav Levinský / (Czech Republic) David Škoch (quarterfinals)
7. (Australia) Ashley Fisher / (United States) Tripp Phillips (second round)
8. (Czech Republic) František Čermák / (Czech Republic) Leoš Friedl (second round)

== Draw ==
=== Key ===
- Q = Qualifier
- WC = Wild card
- LL = Lucky loser
- Alt = Alternate
- SE = Special exempt
- PR = Protected ranking
- ITF = ITF entry
- JE = Junior exempt
- w/o = Walkover
- r = Retired
- d = Defaulted
- SR = Special ranking

=== Finals ===
Semifinals
1	(United States) Bob Bryan (United States) Mike Bryan	7^{7}	7^{7}
3	(Australia) Paul Hanley (Zimbabwe) Kevin Ullyett	6^{5}	6^{5}
4	(The Bahamas) Mark Knowles (Canada) Daniel Nestor	7	7^{7}
2	(Sweden) Jonas Björkman (Belarus) Max Mirnyi	5	6^{4}

Final
1	(United States) Bob Bryan (United States) Mike Bryan	6^{4}	5
4	(The Bahamas) Mark Knowles (Canada) Daniel Nestor	7^{7}	7

=== Top half ===
First round
(United States) A Delić (United States) M Fish	5	4
WC	(United Kingdom) J Delgado (United Kingdom) R Hutchins	7	6
(Spain) F López (Spain) R Nadal	3	6^{6}
(South Africa) J Coetzee (Netherlands) R Wassen	6	7^{8}
(Serbia) N Djokovic (Serbia) J Tipsarević	1	5
(India) M Bhupathi (Czech Republic) R Štěpánek	6	7
(United States) E Butorac (United Kingdom) J Murray	6	7^{7}
(Latvia) E Gulbis (Croatia) I Ljubičić	1	6^{1}

Second round
1	(United States) B Bryan (United States) M Bryan	6	7^{7}
WC	(United Kingdom) J Delgado (United Kingdom) R Hutchins	3	6^{5}
(South Africa) J Coetzee (Netherlands) R Wassen	6	3	[10]
Alt	(United States) J Gimelstob (Australia) S Huss	3	6	[12]
3	(Australia) P Hanley (Zimbabwe) K Ullyett	6	6
(India) M Bhupathi (Czech Republic) R Štěpánek	1	4
(United States) E Butorac (United Kingdom) J Murray	6	6
7	(Australia) A Fisher (United States) T Phillips	1	3

Quarterfinals
1	(United States) B Bryan (United States) M Bryan	6	6
Alt	(United States) J Gimelstob (Australia) S Huss	3	2
3	(Australia) P Hanley (Zimbabwe) K Ullyett	7^{7}	6
(United States) E Butorac (United Kingdom) J Murray	6^{5}	4

Semifinals
1	(United States) B Bryan (United States) M Bryan	7^{7}	7^{7}
3	(Australia) P Hanley (Zimbabwe) K Ullyett	6^{5}	6^{5}

=== Bottom half ===
First round
(Australia) J Kerr (Austria) A Peya	7	4	[8]
(United Kingdom) T Henman (Australia) L Hewitt	5	6	[10]
(France) J Benneteau (France) N Mahut	6	6
(France) P-H Mathieu (France) G Monfils	3	2
(South Africa) C Haggard (South Korea) H-t Lee	2	3
WC	(United Kingdom) A Bogdanovic (Russia) M Safin	6	6
(United Kingdom) J Auckland (United States) R Ginepri	2	3
(Argentina) JM del Potro (Chile) F González	6	6

Second round
8	(Czech Republic) F Čermák (Czech Republic) L Friedl	6	3	[6]
(United Kingdom) T Henman (Australia) L Hewitt	4	6	[10]
(France) J Benneteau (France) N Mahut	6^{3}	6^{3}
4	(The Bahamas) M Knowles (Canada) D Nestor	7^{7}	7^{7}
6	(Czech Republic) J Levinský (Czech Republic) D Škoch	7	6
WC	(United Kingdom) A Bogdanovic (Russia) M Safin	5	4
(Argentina) JM del Potro (Chile) F González	3	4
2	(Sweden) J Björkman (Belarus) M Mirnyi	6	6

Quarterfinals
(United Kingdom) T Henman (Australia) L Hewitt	1	4
4	(The Bahamas) M Knowles (Canada) D Nestor	6	6
6	(Czech Republic) J Levinský (Czech Republic) D Škoch	6^{6}	7^{7}	[10]
2	(Sweden) J Björkman (Belarus) M Mirnyi	7^{8}	6^{3}	[12]

Semifinals
4	(The Bahamas) M Knowles (Canada) D Nestor	7	7^{7}
2	(Sweden) J Björkman (Belarus) M Mirnyi	5	6^{4}
