= 2006 Stella Artois Championships – Doubles =

Doubles
- 2006 Queen's Club Championships

Final
- Champions: (Australia) Paul Hanley; (Zimbabwe) Kevin Ullyett
- Runners-up: (Sweden) Jonas Björkman; (Belarus) Max Mirnyi
- Score: 6–4, 3–6, [10–8]

Details
- Draw: 24

Events
Singles	Doubles
← 2005 ·	Queen's Club Championships	· 2007 →

Bob Bryan and Mike Bryan were the defending champions, but lost in the semifinals this year.

Paul Hanley and Kevin Ullyett won in the final 6–4, 3–6, [10–8], against Jonas Björkman and Max Mirnyi.

== Seeds ==
All seeds receive a bye into the second round.

1. (United States) Bob Bryan / (United States) Mike Bryan (semifinals)
2. (Sweden) Jonas Björkman / (Belarus) Max Mirnyi (final)
3. (The Bahamas) Mark Knowles / (Canada) Daniel Nestor (semifinals)
4. (Australia) Paul Hanley / (Zimbabwe) Kevin Ullyett (champions)
5. (Australia) Stephen Huss / (South Africa) Wesley Moodie (second round)
6. (Czech Republic) František Čermák / (Czech Republic) Leoš Friedl (quarterfinals)
7. (Zimbabwe) Wayne Black / (South Africa) Jeff Coetzee (quarterfinals)
8. (Australia) Wayne Arthurs / (United States) Justin Gimelstob (quarterfinals)

== Draw ==
=== Key ===
- Q = Qualifier
- WC = Wild card
- LL = Lucky loser
- Alt = Alternate
- SE = Special exempt
- PR = Protected ranking
- ITF = ITF entry
- JE = Junior exempt
- w/o = Walkover
- r = Retired
- d = Defaulted
- SR = Special ranking

=== Finals ===
Semifinals

Final

1
- (United States) Bob Bryan
- (United States) Mike Bryan
5
6^{4}

4
- (Australia) Paul Hanley
- (Zimbabwe) Kevin Ullyett
7
7^{7}

4
- (Australia) Paul Hanley
- (Zimbabwe) Kevin Ullyett
6
3
[10]

2
- (Sweden) Jonas Björkman
- (Belarus) Max Mirnyi
4
6
[8]

3
- (The Bahamas) Mark Knowles
- (Canada) Daniel Nestor
7^{7}
6^{4}
[7]

2
- (Sweden) Jonas Björkman
- (Belarus) Max Mirnyi
6^{5}
7^{7}
[10]

=== Top half ===
First round

Second round

Quarterfinals

Semifinals

1
- (United States) B Bryan
- (United States) M Bryan
7^{7}
6

- (France) S Grosjean
- (United Kingdom) A Murray
6
3
[10]

- (France) S Grosjean
- (United Kingdom) A Murray
6^{0}
4

- (United States) P Goldstein
- (United States) J Thomas
3
6
[6]

1
- (United States) B Bryan
- (United States) M Bryan
6^{5}
7^{8}
[10]

- (France) P-H Mathieu
- (France) G Monfils
4
6
[10]

8
- (Australia) W Arthurs
- (United States) J Gimelstob
7^{7}
6^{6}
[7]

- (Czech Republic) L Dlouhý
- (Thailand) P Srichaphan
6
3
[2]

- (France) P-H Mathieu
- (France) G Monfils

8
- (Australia) W Arthurs
- (United States) J Gimelstob
w/o

1
- (United States) B Bryan
- (United States) M Bryan
5
6^{4}

4
- (Australia) P Hanley
- (Zimbabwe) K Ullyett
7
7^{7}

4
- (Australia) P Hanley
- (Zimbabwe) K Ullyett
3
7
[10]

- (United States) R Ginepri
- (Australia) J Kerr
7^{8}
6

- (United States) R Ginepri
- (Australia) J Kerr
6
5
[6]

- (Italy) D Bracciali
- (Croatia) I Ljubičić
6^{6}
3

4
- (Australia) P Hanley
- (Zimbabwe) K Ullyett
6
6

- (India) M Bhupathi
- (Czech Republic) R Štěpánek
4
7^{7}
[11]

7
- (Zimbabwe) W Black
- (South Africa) J Coetzee
4
2

- (France) M Llodra
- (France) N Mahut
6
6^{1}
[9]

- (India) M Bhupathi
- (Czech Republic) R Štěpánek
6^{r}

7
- (Zimbabwe) W Black
- (South Africa) J Coetzee
5

=== Bottom half ===
First round

Second round

Quarterfinals

Semifinals

6
- (Czech Republic) F Čermák
- (Czech Republic) L Friedl
w/o

- (Czech Republic) C Suk
- (Czech Republic) R Vik
3
6^{2}

- (Austria) J Melzer
- (Spain) F Verdasco

- (Austria) J Melzer
- (Spain) F Verdasco
6
7^{7}

6
- (Czech Republic) F Čermák
- (Czech Republic) L Friedl
5
4

- (Chile) F González
- (Sweden) T Johansson
3
6
[9]

3
- (The Bahamas) M Knowles
- (Canada) D Nestor
7
6

- (United States) T Phillips
- (Russia) D Tursunov
6
2
[11]

- (United States) T Phillips
- (Russia) D Tursunov
7^{7}
6^{6}
[11]

3
- (The Bahamas) M Knowles
- (Canada) D Nestor
6^{4}
7^{8}
[13]

3
- (The Bahamas) M Knowles
- (Canada) D Nestor
7^{7}
6^{4}
[7]

2
- (Sweden) J Björkman
- (Belarus) M Mirnyi
6^{5}
7^{7}
[10]

5
- (Australia) S Huss
- (South Africa) W Moodie
4
6^{5}

- (Czech Republic) D Škoch
- (Netherlands) R Wassen
5
6^{5}

WC
- (United States) J Blake
- (United States) M Fish
6
7^{7}

WC
- (United States) J Blake
- (United States) M Fish
7
7^{7}

WC
- (United States) J Blake
- (United States) M Fish
6^{4}
2

- (Spain) F López
- (Spain) R Nadal
3
6^{3}

2
- (Sweden) J Björkman
- (Belarus) M Mirnyi
7^{7}
6

WC
- (United Kingdom) J Auckland
- (United Kingdom) J Delgado
6
7^{7}

WC
- (United Kingdom) J Auckland
- (United Kingdom) J Delgado
7^{7}
4
[6]

2
- (Sweden) J Björkman
- (Belarus) M Mirnyi
6^{4}
6
7^{7}
