= 2001 Davis Cup World Group =

- Date: 9 February – 2 December
- Edition: 21st

Champions
- France
- Davis Cup

The World Group was the highest level of Davis Cup competition in 2001. The first-round losers went into the Davis Cup World Group qualifying round, and the winners progressed to the quarterfinals and were guaranteed a World Group spot for 2002.

France won the title, defeating Australia in the final, 3–2. The final was held at the Rod Laver Arena in Melbourne Park, Melbourne, Australia, from 30 November to 2 December. It was the French team's first Davis Cup title since 1996 and their 9th title overall. France won the title despite not playing a single match on home soil.

== Participating teams ==
Participating teams
Australia	Belgium	Brazil	Czech Republic
Ecuador	France	Germany	Morocco
Netherlands	Romania	Russia	Slovakia
Spain	Sweden	Switzerland	United States

== Draw ==
First round 9–11 February
Perth, Australia (grass)
S	Australia	4
Ecuador	1
Rio de Janeiro, Brazil (clay)
S	Brazil	4
Morocco	1
Helsingborg, Sweden (indoor carpet)
S	Sweden	3
Czech Republic	2
Bratislava, Slovakia (indoor hard)
S	Russia	3
Slovakia	2
Ghent, Belgium (indoor clay)
Belgium	0
S	France	5
Basel, Switzerland (indoor hard)
Switzerland	3
S	United States	2
Braunschweig, Germany (indoor carpet)
Romania	2
S	Germany	3
Eindhoven, Netherlands (indoor carpet)
Netherlands	4
S	Spain	1

Quarterfinals; 6–8 April
Florianópolis, Brazil (clay)
S	Australia	3
S	Brazil	1
Malmö, Sweden (indoor hard)
S	Sweden	4
S	Russia	1
Neuchâtel, Switzerland (indoor carpet)
S	France	3
Switzerland	2
's-Hertogenbosch, Netherlands (indoor carpet)
S	Germany	1
Netherlands	4

Semifinals; 21–23 September
Sydney, Australia (hard)
S	Australia	4
S	Sweden	1
Rotterdam, Netherlands (indoor carpet)
S	France	3
Netherlands	2

Final; 30 November-2 December
Melbourne, Australia (grass)
S	Australia	2
S	France	3

== First round ==
=== Australia vs. Ecuador ===
Australia
4
Royal King's Park Tennis Club, Perth, Australia
9–11 February 2001
Grass

Ecuador
1

			1	2	3	4	5
1	(Australia) (Ecuador)	Pat Rafter; Nicolás Lapentti	6; 3	6; 0	7; 5
2	(Australia) (Ecuador)	Lleyton Hewitt; Giovanni Lapentti	6; 3	6; 2	6; 2
3	(Australia) (Ecuador)	Wayne Arthurs / Todd Woodbridge; Giovanni Lapentti / Nicolás Lapentti	2; 6	6; 2	6; 1	6^{1} 7^{7}	10; 12
4	(Australia) (Ecuador)	Lleyton Hewitt; Nicolás Lapentti	6; 2	6; 1	6; 1
5	(Australia) (Ecuador)	Pat Rafter; Giovanni Lapentti	6; 3	6; 1

=== Brazil vs. Morocco ===
Brazil
4
Universidade Veiga de Almeida, Rio de Janeiro, Brazil
9–11 February 2001
Clay

Morocco
1

			1	2	3	4	5
1	(Brazil) (Morocco)	Gustavo Kuerten; Karim Alami	6^{4} 7^{7}	6; 4	3; 6	6; 1	6; 2
2	(Brazil) (Morocco)	Fernando Meligeni; Hicham Arazi	6; 4	5; 7	6; 3	4; 3		retired
3	(Brazil) (Morocco)	Jaime Oncins / Alexandre Simoni; Karim Alami / Hicham Arazi	6; 3	6; 3	6; 3
4	(Brazil) (Morocco)	Gustavo Kuerten; Mounir El Aarej	6; 2	6; 2
5	(Brazil) (Morocco)	Alexandre Simoni; Karim Alami	4; 6	6; 0	3; 6

=== Sweden vs. Czech Republic ===
Sweden
3
Idrottens hus, Helsingborg, Sweden
9–11 February 2001
Carpet (indoors)

Czech Republic
2

			1	2	3	4	5
1	(Sweden) (Czech Republic)	Thomas Johansson; Bohdan Ulihrach	3; 6	7; 5	2; 6	5; 7
2	(Sweden) (Czech Republic)	Magnus Norman; Jiří Novák	7^{7} 6^{2}	6; 1	1; 6	2; 6	6; 4
3	(Sweden) (Czech Republic)	Jonas Björkman / Nicklas Kulti; Jiří Novák / David Rikl	6; 2	4; 6	7^{8} 6^{6}	7; 5
4	(Sweden) (Czech Republic)	Magnus Norman; Bohdan Ulihrach	3; 6	2; 6	1; 6
5	(Sweden) (Czech Republic)	Thomas Johansson; Jiří Novák	7^{7} 6^{0}	6; 3	6^{4} 7^{7}	6; 2

=== Slovakia vs. Russia ===
Slovakia
2
Incheba Hall, Bratislava, Slovakia
9–11 February 2001
Hard (indoors)

Russia
3

			1	2	3	4	5
1	(Slovakia) (Russia)	Karol Kučera; Marat Safin	3; 6	4; 6	6; 3	7; 5	6; 2
2	(Slovakia) (Russia)	Dominik Hrbatý; Yevgeny Kafelnikov	2; 6	3; 6	5; 7
3	(Slovakia) (Russia)	Dominik Hrbatý / Ján Krošlák; Yevgeny Kafelnikov / Marat Safin	4; 6	4; 6	6; 2	6^{7} 7^{9}
4	(Slovakia) (Russia)	Dominik Hrbatý; Marat Safin	6; 3	6; 1	6; 4
5	(Slovakia) (Russia)	Karol Kučera; Yevgeny Kafelnikov	6; 4	6; 4	3; 6	2; 6	2; 6

=== Belgium vs. France ===
Belgium
0
Flanders Sports Arena, Ghent, Belgium
9–11 February 2001
Clay (indoors)

France
5

			1	2	3	4	5
1	(Belgium) (France)	Christophe Rochus; Arnaud Clément	7^{7} 6^{2}	6; 3	2; 6	4; 6	2; 6
2	(Belgium) (France)	Olivier Rochus; Sébastien Grosjean	6; 4	6; 1	1; 6	3; 6	3; 6
3	(Belgium) (France)	Christophe Rochus / Tom Vanhoudt; Cédric Pioline / Fabrice Santoro	3; 6	2; 6	6^{3} 7^{7}
4	(Belgium) (France)	Filip Dewulf; Arnaud Clément	3; 6	6^{10} 7^{12}
5	(Belgium) (France)	Christophe Rochus; Fabrice Santoro	4; 6	4; 6

=== Switzerland vs. United States ===
Switzerland
3
St. Jakobshalle, Basel, Switzerland
9–11 February 2001
Hard (indoors)

United States
2

			1	2	3	4	5
1	(Switzerland) (United States)	Roger Federer; Todd Martin	6; 4	7^{7} 6^{3}	4; 6	6; 1
2	(Switzerland) (United States)	Michel Kratochvil; Jan-Michael Gambill	3; 6	5; 7	4; 6
3	(Switzerland) (United States)	Roger Federer / Lorenzo Manta; Jan-Michael Gambill / Justin Gimelstob	6; 4	6; 2	7; 5
4	(Switzerland) (United States)	Roger Federer; Jan-Michael Gambill	7; 5	6; 2	4; 6	6; 2
5	(Switzerland) (United States)	George Bastl; Andy Roddick	3; 6	4; 6

=== Germany vs. Romania ===
Germany
3
Volkswagen Halle, Braunschweig, Germany
9–11 February 2001
Carpet (indoors)

Romania
2

			1	2	3	4	5
1	(Germany) (Romania)	Tommy Haas; Ionuț Moldovan	6; 2	6; 0	6; 2
2	(Germany) (Romania)	Nicolas Kiefer; Andrei Pavel	6^{3} 7^{7}	3; 6	7; 5	3; 6
3	(Germany) (Romania)	Marc-Kevin Goellner / David Prinosil; Andrei Pavel / Gabriel Trifu	4; 6	4; 6	4; 6
4	(Germany) (Romania)	Tommy Haas; Andrei Pavel	6; 3	6; 4	7^{8} 6^{6}
5	(Germany) (Romania)	Nicolas Kiefer; Gabriel Trifu	6; 3	6; 1	6; 4

=== Netherlands vs. Spain ===
Netherlands
4
Sportcentrum Eindhoven, Eindhoven, Netherlands
9–11 February 2001
Carpet (indoors)

Spain
1

			1	2	3	4	5
1	(Netherlands) (Spain)	Raemon Sluiter; Juan Carlos Ferrero	6^{5} 7^{7}	7^{9} 6^{7}	3; 6	7^{7} 6^{3}	6; 4
2	(Netherlands) (Spain)	Sjeng Schalken; Carlos Moyá	6; 4	7; 5	6; 4
3	(Netherlands) (Spain)	Paul Haarhuis / Sjeng Schalken; Joan Balcells / Àlex Corretja	4; 6	6; 3	7^{7} 6^{3}	7^{12} 6^{10}
4	(Netherlands) (Spain)	Jan Siemerink; Joan Balcells	6^{9} 7^{11}	6; 4	7^{7} 6^{5}
5	(Netherlands) (Spain)	Raemon Sluiter; Carlos Moyá	4; 6	6^{2} 7^{7}

== Quarterfinals ==
=== Brazil vs. Australia ===
Brazil
1
Florianópolis Court Tennis Centre, Florianópolis, Brazil
6–8 April 2001
Clay

Australia
3

			1	2	3	4	5
1	(Brazil) (Australia)	Gustavo Kuerten; Pat Rafter	4; 6	6; 4	7^{7} 6^{1}	2; 1		retired
2	(Brazil) (Australia)	Fernando Meligeni; Lleyton Hewitt	3; 6	3; 6	3; 6
3	(Brazil) (Australia)	Gustavo Kuerten / Jaime Oncins; Lleyton Hewitt / Pat Rafter	6^{7} 7^{9}	6^{3} 7^{7}	6^{5} 7^{7}
4	(Brazil) (Australia)	Gustavo Kuerten; Lleyton Hewitt	6^{5} 7^{7}	3; 6	6^{3} 7^{7}
5	(Brazil) (Australia)	Alexandre Simoni; Richard Fromberg	2; 6	4; 4				not completed

=== Sweden vs. Russia ===
Sweden
4
Baltiska hallen, Malmö, Sweden
6–8 April 2001
Hard (indoors)

Russia
1

			1	2	3	4	5
1	(Sweden) (Russia)	Thomas Johansson; Yevgeny Kafelnikov	6; 4	1; 6	7^{12} 6^{10}	3; 6	6; 2
2	(Sweden) (Russia)	Magnus Norman; Mikhail Youzhny	7^{11} 6^{9}	6; 4	6; 2
3	(Sweden) (Russia)	Simon Aspelin / Jonas Björkman; Yevgeny Kafelnikov / Andrei Olhovskiy	4; 6	6; 1	7; 5	6^{2} 7^{7}	6; 2
4	(Sweden) (Russia)	Magnus Norman; Andrei Stoliarov	3; 6	6; 3	1; 6
5	(Sweden) (Russia)	Thomas Johansson; Mikhail Youzhny	6; 3	2; 6	6; 2

=== Switzerland vs. France ===
Switzerland
2
Patinoires du Littoral, Neuchâtel, Switzerland
6–8 April 2001
Carpet (indoors)

France
3

			1	2	3	4	5
1	(Switzerland) (France)	Marc Rosset; Arnaud Clément	3; 6	6; 3	6^{4} 7^{7}	7^{8} 6^{6}	13; 15
2	(Switzerland) (France)	Roger Federer; Nicolas Escudé	4; 6	7^{7} 6^{1}	3; 6	4; 6
3	(Switzerland) (France)	Roger Federer / Lorenzo Manta; Cédric Pioline / Fabrice Santoro	5; 7	6; 3	7^{7} 6^{4}	6^{3} 7^{7}	9; 7
4	(Switzerland) (France)	Roger Federer; Arnaud Clément	6; 4	3; 6	7^{7} 6^{5}	6; 4
5	(Switzerland) (France)	George Bastl; Nicolas Escudé	6; 1	5; 7	7^{7} 6^{3}	4; 6	6; 8

=== Netherlands vs. Germany ===
Netherlands
4
Brabanthallen, 's-Hertogenbosch, Netherlands
6–8 April 2001
Carpet (indoors)

Germany
1

			1	2	3	4	5
1	(Netherlands) (Germany)	Jan Siemerink; Nicolas Kiefer	6; 3	7^{7} 6^{5}	3; 6	6; 3
2	(Netherlands) (Germany)	Raemon Sluiter; David Prinosil	6; 1	6; 3	7^{7} 6^{3}
3	(Netherlands) (Germany)	Paul Haarhuis / Sjeng Schalken; Jens Knippschild / David Prinosil	6; 3	6; 4	4; 6	6; 2
4	(Netherlands) (Germany)	Jan Siemerink; David Prinosil	7^{7} 6^{4}	7; 5
5	(Netherlands) (Germany)	Raemon Sluiter; Nicolas Kiefer	6; 3	2; 6	3; 6

== Semifinals ==
=== Australia vs. Sweden ===
Australia
4
Sydney Olympic Park Tennis Centre, Sydney, Australia
21–23 September 2001
Hard

Sweden
1

			1	2	3	4	5
1	(Australia) (Sweden)	Pat Rafter; Thomas Johansson	6; 3	7^{10} 6^{8}	3; 6	2; 6	3; 6
2	(Australia) (Sweden)	Lleyton Hewitt; Jonas Björkman	4; 6	6; 4	7^{7} 6^{5}	7^{7} 6^{2}
3	(Australia) (Sweden)	Wayne Arthurs / Todd Woodbridge; Jonas Björkman / Magnus Larsson	6^{3} 7^{7}	7^{7} 6^{2}	7^{7} 6^{5}	7^{7} 6^{3}
4	(Australia) (Sweden)	Lleyton Hewitt; Thomas Johansson	7^{7} 6^{3}	5; 7	6; 2	6; 1
5	(Australia) (Sweden)	Pat Rafter; Jonas Björkman	6; 3	6; 2

=== Netherlands vs. France ===
Netherlands
2
Rotterdam Ahoy, Rotterdam, Netherlands
21–23 September 2001
Carpet (indoors)

France
3

			1	2	3	4	5
1	(Netherlands) (France)	Raemon Sluiter; Arnaud Clément	6; 3	2; 6	2; 1			retired
2	(Netherlands) (France)	Sjeng Schalken; Nicolas Escudé	7^{7} 6^{3}	6^{4} 7^{7}	6; 4	6^{4} 7^{7}	6; 8
3	(Netherlands) (France)	Paul Haarhuis / Sjeng Schalken; Cédric Pioline / Fabrice Santoro	5; 7	1; 6	5; 7
4	(Netherlands) (France)	Sjeng Schalken; Arnaud Clément	7^{8} 6^{6}	7^{7} 6^{3}
5	(Netherlands) (France)	Jan Siemerink; Fabrice Santoro	6; 4	6; 4

== Final ==
=== Australia vs. France ===
Australia
2
Rod Laver Arena, Melbourne Park, Melbourne, Australia
30 November–2 December 2001
Grass

France
3

			1	2	3	4	5
1	(Australia) (France)	Lleyton Hewitt; Nicolas Escudé	6; 4	3; 6	6; 3	3; 6	4; 6
2	(Australia) (France)	Pat Rafter; Sébastien Grosjean	6; 3	7^{8} 6^{6}	7; 5
3	(Australia) (France)	Lleyton Hewitt / Pat Rafter; Cédric Pioline / Fabrice Santoro	6; 2	3; 6	6^{5} 7^{7}	1; 6
4	(Australia) (France)	Lleyton Hewitt; Sébastien Grosjean	6; 3	6; 2	6; 3
5	(Australia) (France)	Wayne Arthurs; Nicolas Escudé	6^{3} 7^{7}	7^{7} 6^{5}	3; 6	3; 6
