= 2005 Stella Artois Championships – Singles =

Singles
- 2005 Stella Artois Championships

Final
- Champion: (United States) Andy Roddick
- Runner-up: (Croatia) Ivo Karlović
- Score: 7–6^{(9–7)}, 7–6^{(7–4)}

Details
- Draw: 56
- Seeds: 16

Events
Singles	Doubles
- Queen's Club Championships

Andy Roddick was the two-time defending champion and won in the final 7–6^{(9–7)}, 7–6^{(7–4)} against Ivo Karlović.

== Seeds ==
The top eight seeds received a bye to the second round.

1. (Australia) Lleyton Hewitt (quarterfinals)
2. (United States) Andy Roddick (champion)
3. (United Kingdom) Tim Henman (quarterfinals)
4. (Czech Republic) Radek Štěpánek (semifinals)
5. (Croatia) Mario Ančić (third round)
6. (Sweden) Thomas Johansson (semifinals)
7. (France) Sébastien Grosjean (quarterfinals)
8. (Chile) Fernando González (second round)
9. (United States) Taylor Dent (second round)
10. (France) Richard Gasquet (quarterfinals)
11. (Thailand) Paradorn Srichaphan (first round)
12. (Argentina) ~~Mariano Puerta~~ (withdrew because of a leg injury)
13. (Russia) Igor Andreev (second round)
14. (United Kingdom) Greg Rusedski (third round)
15. (Belarus) Max Mirnyi (third round)
16. (Slovakia) Karol Beck (third round)

== Draw ==
Key

- Q = Qualifier
- WC = Wild card
- LL = Lucky loser
- Alt = Alternate
- ITF = ITF entry
- PR = Protected ranking
- SR = Special ranking
- SE = Special exempt
- JE = Junior exempt
- JR = Junior Accelerator Programme entrant
- CO = College Accelerator Programme entrant
- NG = Next Gen Accelerator Program entrant
- w/o = Walkover
- r = Retired
- d = Defaulted

=== Finals ===
Quarterfinals
1	(Australia) Lleyton Hewitt	6^{4}	3
(Croatia) Ivo Karlović	7^{7}	6
3	(United Kingdom) Tim Henman	4	4
6	(Sweden) Thomas Johansson	6	6
10	(France) Richard Gasquet	6	1	2
4	(Czech Republic) Radek Štěpánek	3	6	6
7	(France) Sébastien Grosjean	4	6^{5}
2	(United States) Andy Roddick	6	7^{7}

Semifinals
(Croatia) Ivo Karlović	6	7^{9}
6	(Sweden) Thomas Johansson	4	6^{7}
4	(Czech Republic) Radek Štěpánek	3	6	2
2	(United States) Andy Roddick	6	2	6

Final
(Croatia) Ivo Karlović	6^{7}	6^{4}
2	(United States) Andy Roddick	7^{9}	7^{7}

=== Top half ===
==== Section 1 ====
First round
(South Korea) H-T Lee	2	0
(Belgium) X Malisse	6	6
(Germany) B Phau	2	6^{6}
(Italy) D Sanguinetti	6	7^{8}
(Czech Republic) T Berdych	6^{5}	6	2
15	(Belarus) M Mirnyi	7^{7}	3	6
11	(Thailand) P Srichaphan	3	4
(United States) K Kim	6	6
(France) J Haehnel	3	4
(Czech Republic) T Zíb	6	6
Q	(Slovakia) M Mertiňák	6^{6}	6^{3}
(Croatia) I Karlović	7^{8}	7^{7}

Second round
1	(Australia) L Hewitt	6^{3}	7	7
(Belgium) X Malisse	7^{7}	5	5
(Italy) D Sanguinetti	4	3
15	(Belarus) M Mirnyi	6	6
(United States) K Kim	6	1	4
(Czech Republic) T Zíb	4	6	6
(Croatia) I Karlović	6	7^{7}
8	(Chile) F González	3	6^{4}

Third round
1	(Australia) L Hewitt	6	1	6
15	(Belarus) M Mirnyi	3	6	1
(Czech Republic) T Zíb	2	4
(Croatia) I Karlović	6	6

Quarterfinals
1	(Australia) L Hewitt	6^{4}	3
(Croatia) I Karlović	7^{7}	6

==== Section 2 ====
First round
(Germany) L Burgsmüller	2	2
(United States) R Ginepri	6	6
Q	(Australia) C Guccione	7^{7}	3	6
(Belgium) K Vliegen	6^{2}	6	4
Q	(United Kingdom) A Mackin	5	6	3
13	(Russia) I Andreev	7	4	6
9	(United States) T Dent	6	6
(Germany) T Behrend	4	3
(Spain) S Ventura	1	2
WC	(United Kingdom) A Murray	6	6
(France) J Benneteau	2	3
(Luxembourg) G Müller	6	6

Second round
3	(United Kingdom) T Henman	7^{7}	4	6
(United States) R Ginepri	6^{5}	6	1
Q	(Australia) C Guccione	6	6
13	(Russia) I Andreev	4	4
9	(United States) T Dent	3	3
WC	(United Kingdom) A Murray	6	6
(Luxembourg) G Müller	7^{7}	4	5
6	(Sweden) T Johansson	6^{4}	6	7

Third round
3	(United Kingdom) T Henman	6^{4}	6	6
Q	(Australia) C Guccione	7^{7}	2	2
WC	(United Kingdom) A Murray	6^{1}	7^{7}	5
6	(Sweden) T Johansson	7^{7}	6^{5}	7

Quarterfinals
3	(United Kingdom) T Henman	4	4
6	(Sweden) T Johansson	6	6

=== Bottom half ===
==== Section 3 ====
First round
(Czech Republic) J Hernych	6	2	6
(France) A Clément	4	6	2
WC	(United Kingdom) J Delgado	6	6
(France) G Monfils	2	4
(Serbia and Montenegro) J Tipsarević	1	6^{3}
10	(France) R Gasquet	6	7^{7}
14	(United Kingdom) G Rusedski	6	6
WC	(United Kingdom) J Goodall	3	4
(Russia) D Tursunov	7	6
(Sweden) J Björkman	5	3
(Armenia) S Sargsian	0^{r}
Q	(France) G Carraz	3

Second round
5	(Croatia) M Ančić	6	6
(Czech Republic) J Hernych	4	4
WC	(United Kingdom) J Delgado	4	1
10	(France) R Gasquet	6	6
14	(United Kingdom) G Rusedski	6	6^{3}	6
(Russia) D Tursunov	1	7^{7}	4
Q	(France) G Carraz	2	6	5
4	(Czech Republic) R Štěpánek	6	4	7

Third round
5	(Croatia) M Ančić	5	6	3
10	(France) R Gasquet	7	1	6
14	(United Kingdom) G Rusedski	3	6^{4}
4	(Czech Republic) R Štěpánek	6	7^{7}

Quarterfinals
10	(France) R Gasquet	6	1	2
4	(Czech Republic) R Štěpánek	3	6	6

==== Section 4 ====
First round
(Spain) G García López	7^{7}	6
(Monaco) J-R Lisnard	6^{2}	1
(Australia) S Draper	7^{7}	6^{4}	2
(Romania) V Hănescu	6^{3}	7^{7}	6
WC	(United States) J Blake	6	3	6
LL	(United States) J Morrison	4	6	3
16	(Slovakia) K Beck	7	6
(Australia) W Arthurs	5	4
(Cyprus) M Baghdatis	6	6^{3}	4
(France) P-H Mathieu	4	7^{7}	6
(Netherlands) R Sluiter	4	0
WC	(Australia) M Philippoussis	6	6

Second round
7	(France) S Grosjean	7	6
(Spain) G García López	5	3
(Romania) V Hănescu	2	4
WC	(United States) J Blake	6	6
16	(Slovakia) K Beck	6	4	7^{7}
(France) P-H Mathieu	2	6	6^{5}
WC	(Australia) M Philippoussis	2	4
2	(United States) A Roddick	6	6

Third round
7	(France) S Grosjean	2	6	7^{12}
WC	(United States) J Blake	6	3	6^{10}
16	(Slovakia) K Beck	2	6	4
2	(United States) A Roddick	6	3	6

Quarterfinals
7	(France) S Grosjean	4	6^{5}
2	(United States) A Roddick	6	7^{7}
