= 2005 Stella Artois Championships =

- Date: 6–12 June
- Edition: 103rd
- Category: International Series
- Draw: 56S / 24D
- Prize money: $775,000
- Surface: Grass / outdoor
- Location: London, United Kingdom
- Venue: Queen's Club

Champions

Singles
- (United States) Andy Roddick

Doubles
- (United States) Bob Bryan / (United States) Mike Bryan
- Queen's Club Championships

The 2005 Stella Artois Championships was a men's tennis tournament played on grass courts at the Queen's Club in London in the United Kingdom and was part of the International Series of the 2005 ATP Tour. It was the 103rd edition of the tournament and was held from 6 June through 12 June 2005. Second-seeded Andy Roddick won his third consecutive singles title at the event.

== Finals ==
=== Singles ===
(United States) Andy Roddick defeated (Croatia) Ivo Karlović 7–6^{(9–7)}, 7–6^{(7–4)}

- It was Roddick's 3rd singles title of the year and the 18th of his career.

=== Doubles ===
(United States) Bob Bryan / (United States) Mike Bryan defeated (Sweden) Jonas Björkman / (Belarus) Max Mirnyi 7–6^{(11–9)}, 7–6^{(7–4)}

- It was Bob Bryan's 2nd title of the year and the 23rd of his career. It was Mike Bryan's 2nd title of the year and the 25th of his career.
