= 2002 Davis Cup World Group =

- Date: 8 February – 1 December
- Edition: 22nd

Champions
- Russia
- Davis Cup

The World Group was the highest level of Davis Cup competition in 2002. The first-round losers went into the Davis Cup World Group qualifying round, and the winners progress to the quarterfinals. The quarterfinalists were guaranteed a World Group spot for 2003.

== Participating teams ==
Participating teams
Argentina	Australia	Brazil	Croatia
Czech Republic	France	Germany	Great Britain
Morocco	Netherlands	Russia	Slovakia
Spain	Sweden	Switzerland	United States

== Draw ==
First round 8–10 February
Metz, France (indoor clay)
S	France	3
Netherlands	2
Ostrava, Czech Republic (indoor carpet)
Czech Republic	4
S	Brazil	1
Zaragoza, Spain (indoor clay)
S	Spain	3
Morocco	2
Oklahoma City, United States (indoor hard)
S	United States	5
Slovakia	0
Moscow, Russia (indoor clay)
Switzerland	2
S	Russia	3
Birmingham, England (indoor carpet)
Great Britain	2
S	Sweden	3
Zagreb, Croatia (indoor carpet)
Croatia	4
S	Germany	1
Buenos Aires, Argentina (clay)
Argentina	5
S	Australia	0

Quarterfinals; 5–7 April
Pau, France (indoor carpet)
S	France	3
Czech Republic	1
Houston, United States (grass)
S	Spain	1
S	United States	3
Moscow, Russia (indoor clay)
S	Russia	4
S	Sweden	1
Buenos Aires, Argentina (clay)
Croatia	2
Argentina	3

Semifinals; 20–22 September
Paris, France (clay)
S	France	3
S	United States	2
Moscow, Russia (indoor carpet)
S	Russia	3
Argentina	2

Final; 29 November-1 December
Paris, France (indoor clay)
S	France	2
S	Russia	3

== First round ==
=== France vs. Netherlands ===
France
3
The Arena, Metz, France
8–10 February 2002
Clay (i)

Netherlands
2

			1	2	3	4	5
1	(France) (Netherlands)	Sébastien Grosjean; Edwin Kempes	7; 5	7^{7} 6^{5}	6; 2
2	(France) (Netherlands)	Arnaud Clément; Sjeng Schalken	7; 5	2; 6	6^{7} 7^{9}	6; 4	6; 2
3	(France) (Netherlands)	Cédric Pioline / Fabrice Santoro; Paul Haarhuis / Sjeng Schalken	4; 6	6; 4	1; 6	5; 7
4	(France) (Netherlands)	Sébastien Grosjean; Sjeng Schalken	6; 2	1; 6	7^{8} 6^{6}	2; 6	6; 3
5	(France) (Netherlands)	Arnaud Clément; Edwin Kempes	6^{5} 7^{7}	3; 6

=== Czech Republic vs. Brazil ===
Czech Republic
4
Sports Culture Palace, Ostrava, Czech Republic
8–10 February 2002
Carpet (i)

Brazil
1

			1	2	3	4	5
1	(Czech Republic) (Brazil)	Jiří Novák; André Sá	6^{10} 7^{12}	6; 1	6; 1	6; 4
2	(Czech Republic) (Brazil)	Bohdan Ulihrach; Fernando Meligeni	6; 3	6; 4	6; 4
3	(Czech Republic) (Brazil)	Jiří Novák / David Rikl; André Sá / Alexandre Simoni	6; 4	6; 3	7; 5
4	(Czech Republic) (Brazil)	Jan Vacek; Flávio Saretta	1; 6	6^{6} 7^{8}
5	(Czech Republic) (Brazil)	Bohdan Ulihrach; André Sá	6; 1	6; 2

=== Spain vs. Morocco ===
Spain
3
Pabellón Príncipe Felipe, Zaragoza, Spain
8–10 February 2002
Clay (i)

Morocco
2

			1	2	3	4	5
1	(Spain) (Morocco)	Juan Carlos Ferrero; Hicham Arazi	6; 3	6; 1	6; 2
2	(Spain) (Morocco)	Àlex Corretja; Younes El Aynaoui	3; 6	5; 7	4; 6
3	(Spain) (Morocco)	Juan Manuel Balcells / Àlex Corretja; Karim Alami / Hicham Arazi	2; 6	6; 2	7^{10} 6^{8}	6; 4
4	(Spain) (Morocco)	Juan Carlos Ferrero; Younes El Aynaoui	6^{2} 7^{7}	0; 6	6; 3	6; 0	3; 6
5	(Spain) (Morocco)	Àlex Corretja; Hicham Arazi	6; 3	6; 0				retired

=== United States vs. Slovakia ===
United States
5
Myriad Convention Center, Oklahoma City, United States
8–10 February 2002
Hard (i)

Slovakia
0

			1	2	3	4	5
1	(United States) (Slovakia)	Pete Sampras; Karol Beck	6; 3	6^{3} 7^{7}	6; 1	7; 5
2	(United States) (Slovakia)	Andy Roddick; Ján Krošlák	6; 4	6; 4	6^{5} 7^{7}	7^{7} 6^{1}
3	(United States) (Slovakia)	James Blake / Mardy Fish; Karol Beck / Ján Krošlák	6; 3	6^{5} 7^{7}	6; 3	6; 4
4	(United States) (Slovakia)	James Blake; Ladislav Švarc	4; 6	6; 3	6; 0
5	(United States) (Slovakia)	Andy Roddick; Karol Beck	6; 4	7^{7} 6^{5}

=== Russia vs. Switzerland ===
Russia
3
Olympic Stadium, Moscow, Russia
8–10 February 2002
Clay (i)

Switzerland
2

			1	2	3	4	5
1	(Russia) (Switzerland)	Marat Safin; Roger Federer	5; 7	1; 6	2; 6
2	(Russia) (Switzerland)	Yevgeny Kafelnikov; Michel Kratochvil	6; 3	4; 6	1; 6	7^{7} 6^{3}	6; 2
3	(Russia) (Switzerland)	Yevgeny Kafelnikov / Marat Safin; Roger Federer / Marc Rosset	6; 2	7^{8} 6^{6}	6^{0} 7^{7}	6; 2
4	(Russia) (Switzerland)	Yevgeny Kafelnikov; Roger Federer	6^{6} 7^{8}	1; 6	1; 6
5	(Russia) (Switzerland)	Marat Safin; Michel Kratochvil	6; 1	7^{8} 6^{6}	6; 4

=== Great Britain vs. Sweden ===
Great Britain
2
National Indoor Arena, Birmingham, England
8–10 February 2002
Carpet (i)

Sweden
3

			1	2	3	4	5
1	(United Kingdom) (Sweden)	Tim Henman; Jonas Björkman	6; 4	7; 5	4; 6	7; 5
2	(United Kingdom) (Sweden)	Greg Rusedski; Thomas Enqvist	6^{3} 7^{7}	6^{5} 7^{7}	2; 6
3	(United Kingdom) (Sweden)	Tim Henman / Greg Rusedski; Jonas Björkman / Thomas Johansson	7^{7} 6^{1}	2; 6	6^{4} 7^{7}	6; 3	6; 3
4	(United Kingdom) (Sweden)	Tim Henman; Thomas Enqvist	4; 6	2; 6	4; 6
5	(United Kingdom) (Sweden)	Greg Rusedski; Thomas Johansson	6; 4	3; 6	5; 7	4; 6

=== Croatia vs. Germany ===
Croatia
4
Dom Sports Hall, Zagreb, Croatia
8–10 February 2002
Carpet (i)

Germany
1

			1	2	3	4	5
1	(Croatia) (Germany)	Ivan Ljubičić; Rainer Schüttler	7; 5	6^{3} 7^{7}	3; 6	6^{5} 7^{7}
2	(Croatia) (Germany)	Goran Ivanišević; Nicolas Kiefer	7^{7} 6^{3}	6; 3	6; 4
3	(Croatia) (Germany)	Goran Ivanišević / Ivan Ljubičić; Michael Kohlmann / David Prinosil	6; 4	6; 4	7; 5
4	(Croatia) (Germany)	Goran Ivanišević; Rainer Schüttler	6; 4	7^{7} 6^{4}	7^{7} 6^{5}
5	(Croatia) (Germany)	Ivan Ljubičić; Nicolas Kiefer	7^{7} 6^{1}	6; 4

=== Argentina vs. Australia ===
Argentina
5
Buenos Aires Lawn Tennis Club, Buenos Aires, Argentina
8–10 February 2002
Clay

Australia
0

			1	2	3	4	5
1	(Argentina) (Australia)	Guillermo Cañas; Scott Draper	6; 4	6^{4} 7^{7}	5; 7	6; 4	6; 1
2	(Argentina) (Australia)	Gastón Gaudio; Andrew Ilie	6; 1	6; 1	6; 2
3	(Argentina) (Australia)	Lucas Arnold Ker / Guillermo Cañas; Wayne Arthurs / Todd Woodbridge	3; 6	6; 3	6; 4	1; 6	10; 8
4	(Argentina) (Australia)	Juan Ignacio Chela; Andrew Ilie	6; 1	6; 1
5	(Argentina) (Australia)	Gastón Gaudio; Scott Draper	6; 3	6; 2

== Quarterfinals ==
=== France vs. Czech Republic ===
France
3
Palais des Sports, Pau, France
5–7 April 2002
Carpet (i)

Czech Republic
2

			1	2	3	4	5
1	(France) (Czech Republic)	Sébastien Grosjean; Bohdan Ulihrach	6; 3	3; 6	0; 6	6; 3	6; 1
2	(France) (Czech Republic)	Nicolas Escudé; Jiří Novák	6^{4} 7^{7}	1; 6	7^{7} 6^{5}	5; 7
3	(France) (Czech Republic)	Michaël Llodra / Fabrice Santoro; Jiří Novák / David Rikl	6; 3	6; 1	6; 4
4	(France) (Czech Republic)	Sébastien Grosjean; Jiří Novák	6; 3	1; 6	3; 6	1; 6
5	(France) (Czech Republic)	Fabrice Santoro; Bohdan Ulihrach	7^{7} 6^{2}	7; 5	3; 6	4; 6	6; 3

=== United States vs. Spain ===
United States
3
Westside Tennis Club, Houston, United States
5–7 April 2002
Grass

Spain
1

			1	2	3	4	5
1	(United States) (Spain)	Andy Roddick; Tommy Robredo	6; 3	7; 5	7^{9} 6^{7}
2	(United States) (Spain)	Pete Sampras; Àlex Corretja	6; 4	6; 4	6^{4} 7^{7}	5; 7	4; 6
3	(United States) (Spain)	James Blake / Todd Martin; Juan Manuel Balcells / Alberto Martín	6; 1	6; 4	6; 4
4	(United States) (Spain)	Andy Roddick; Alberto Martín	6; 2	6; 4	6; 2
5	(United States) (Spain)	James Blake; Tommy Robredo	1; 6	4; 5				not completed

=== Russia vs. Sweden ===
Russia
4
Luzhniki Palace of Sports, Moscow, Russia
5–7 April 2002
Clay (i)

Sweden
1

			1	2	3	4	5
1	(Russia) (Sweden)	Marat Safin; Thomas Johansson	6; 4	6; 4	6; 4
2	(Russia) (Sweden)	Yevgeny Kafelnikov; Thomas Enqvist	7^{8} 6^{6}	6; 3	6; 1
3	(Russia) (Sweden)	Yevgeny Kafelnikov / Marat Safin; Jonas Björkman / Thomas Johansson	3; 6	7^{8} 6^{6}	6^{2} 7^{7}	7; 5	6; 3
4	(Russia) (Sweden)	Mikhail Youzhny; Thomas Johansson	3; 6	4; 6
5	(Russia) (Sweden)	Andrei Stoliarov; Andreas Vinciguerra	4; 6	5; 2				retired

=== Argentina vs. Croatia ===
Argentina
3
Buenos Aires Lawn Tennis Club, Buenos Aires, Argentina
5–7 April 2002
Clay

Croatia
2

			1	2	3	4	5
1	(Argentina) (Croatia)	Gastón Gaudio; Ivan Ljubičić	7^{7} 6^{5}	6; 2	6; 3
2	(Argentina) (Croatia)	Juan Ignacio Chela; Ivo Karlović	5; 7	6; 4	6; 4	6; 2
3	(Argentina) (Croatia)	Lucas Arnold Ker / Guillermo Cañas; Goran Ivanišević / Ivan Ljubičić	6; 4	6; 2	3; 6	0; 6	6; 8
4	(Argentina) (Croatia)	Juan Ignacio Chela; Ivan Ljubičić	3; 6	6; 1	6^{5} 7^{7}	4; 6
5	(Argentina) (Croatia)	Gastón Gaudio; Ivo Karlović	6; 4	6; 4	6; 2

== Semifinals ==
=== France vs. United States ===
France
3
Roland Garros, Paris, France
20–22 September 2002
Clay

United States
2

			1	2	3	4	5
1	(France) (United States)	Arnaud Clément; Andy Roddick	4; 6	7^{8} 6^{6}	7^{7} 6^{5}	6; 1
2	(France) (United States)	Sébastien Grosjean; James Blake	6; 4	6; 1	6^{7} 7^{9}	7; 5
3	(France) (United States)	Michaël Llodra / Fabrice Santoro; James Blake / Todd Martin	6; 2	6^{2} 7^{7}	6; 2	4; 6	4; 6
4	(France) (United States)	Sébastien Grosjean; Andy Roddick	6; 4	3; 6	6; 3	6; 4
5	(France) (United States)	Arnaud Clément; James Blake	4; 6	3; 6

=== Russia vs. Argentina ===
Russia
3
Luzhniki Palace of Sports, Moscow, Russia
20–22 September 2002
Carpet (i)

Argentina
2

			1	2	3	4	5
1	(Russia) (Argentina)	Marat Safin; Juan Ignacio Chela	6^{1} 7^{7}	7; 5	7; 5	6; 1
2	(Russia) (Argentina)	Yevgeny Kafelnikov; Gastón Gaudio	3; 6	7; 5	6; 3	2; 6	8; 6
3	(Russia) (Argentina)	Yevgeny Kafelnikov / Marat Safin; Lucas Arnold Ker / David Nalbandian	4; 6	4; 6	7; 5	6; 3	17; 19
4	(Russia) (Argentina)	Marat Safin; David Nalbandian	7^{7} 6^{3}	6^{5} 7^{7}	6; 0	6; 3
5	(Russia) (Argentina)	Mikhail Youzhny; Juan Ignacio Chela	6^{5} 7^{7}	7^{7} 6^{3}	4; 6

== Final ==
=== France vs. Russia ===
France
2
Palais Omnisports de Paris-Bercy, Paris, France
29 November - 1 December 2002
Clay (i)

Russia
3

			1	2	3	4	5
1	(France) (Russia)	Paul-Henri Mathieu; Marat Safin	4; 6	6; 3	1; 6	4; 6
2	(France) (Russia)	Sébastien Grosjean; Yevgeny Kafelnikov	7^{7} 6^{3}	6; 3	6; 0
3	(France) (Russia)	Nicolas Escudé / Fabrice Santoro; Yevgeny Kafelnikov / Marat Safin	6; 3	3; 6	5; 7	6; 3	6; 4
4	(France) (Russia)	Sébastien Grosjean; Marat Safin	3; 6	2; 6	6^{12} 7^{14}
5	(France) (Russia)	Paul-Henri Mathieu; Mikhail Youzhny	6; 3	6; 2	3; 6	5; 7	4; 6
