= 1970 Queen's Club Championships – Men's doubles =

Men's doubles
- 1970 Queen's Club Championships

Final
- Champions: (Netherlands) Tom Okker (United States) Marty Riessen
- Runners-up: (United States) Arthur Ashe (United States) Charlie Pasarell
- Score: 6–4, 6–4

Details
- Draw: 27

Events
Singles	men	women
Doubles	men	women
← 1969 ·	Queen's Club Championships	· 1971 →

Owen Davidson and Dennis Ralston were the defending champions, but did not participate together this year.

Tom Okker and Marty Riessen won the title, defeating Arthur Ashe and Charlie Pasarell 6–4, 6–4 in the final.

== Seeds ==
1. (Australia) John Newcombe / (Australia) Tony Roche (quarterfinals)
2. (Australia) Rod Laver / (South Africa) Frew McMillan (quarterfinals)
3. (United States) Robert Lutz / (United States) Stan Smith (semifinals)
4. (United States) Arthur Ashe / (United States) Charlie Pasarell (final)
5. (South Africa) Cliff Drysdale / (United Kingdom) Roger Taylor (quarterfinals)
6. (Soviet Union) Sergei Likhachev / (Soviet Union) Alex Metreveli (quarterfinals)
7. (Netherlands) Tom Okker / (United States) Marty Riessen (champions)
8. (Australia) Bill Bowrey / (Australia) Owen Davidson (semifinals)

== Draw ==
=== Key ===
- Q = Qualifier
- WC = Wild card
- LL = Lucky loser
- Alt = Alternate
- ITF = ITF entry
- PR = Protected ranking
- SR = Special ranking
- SE = Special exempt
- JE = Junior exempt
- JR = Junior Accelerator Programme entrant
- CO = College Accelerator Programme entrant
- NG = Next Gen Accelerator Program entrant
- w/o = Walkover
- r = Retired
- d = Defaulted

=== Finals ===
Semifinals
8	(Australia) Bill Bowrey (Australia) Owen Davidson	3	4
4	(United States) Arthur Ashe (United States) Charlie Pasarell	6	6
3	(United States) Robert Lutz (United States) Stan Smith	4	4
7	(Netherlands) Tom Okker (United States) Marty Riessen	6	6

Final
4	(United States) Arthur Ashe (United States) Charlie Pasarell	4	4
7	(Netherlands) Tom Okker (United States) Marty Riessen	6	6

=== Top half ===
First round
2	(Australia) R Laver (South Africa) F McMillan	6	6
(Australia) J Alexander (Australia) P Dent	4	4
(Spain) A Muñoz (Spain) M Orantes	6	6
(Mexico) J Loyo-Mayo (United Kingdom) B Mottram	3	3
(United States) C Graebner (United States) R Holmberg	w/o
(France) G Goven (France) F Jauffret
6	(Soviet Union) S Likhachev (Soviet Union) A Metreveli	7	9
(New Zealand) John McDonald (United Kingdom) Reginald Bennett	5	7
(India) P Lall (India) J Mukherjea	3	2
(United States) J McManus (United States) J Osborne	6	6
(Australia) D Crealy (United Arab Republic) I El Shafei
(Czechoslovakia) Š Koudelka (France) B Montrenaud	w/o

Second round
2	(Australia) R Laver (South Africa) F McMillan	6	6
(Spain) A Muñoz (Spain) M Orantes	0	3
(United States) C Graebner (United States) R Holmberg	8	3	4
8	(Australia) B Bowrey (Australia) O Davidson	6	6	6
6	(Soviet Union) S Likhachev (Soviet Union) A Metreveli	6	6
(United States) J McManus (United States) J Osborne	2	3
(Czechoslovakia) Š Koudelka (France) B Montrenaud	2	2
4	(United States) A Ashe (United States) C Pasarell	6	6

Quarterfinals
2	(Australia) R Laver (South Africa) F McMillan	6	2
8	(Australia) B Bowrey (Australia) O Davidson	8	6
6	(Soviet Union) S Likhachev (Soviet Union) A Metreveli	9	4	7
4	(United States) A Ashe (United States) C Pasarell	7	6	9

Semifinals
8	(Australia) B Bowrey (Australia) O Davidson	3	4
4	(United States) A Ashe (United States) C Pasarell	6	6

=== Bottom half ===
First round
(West Germany) I Buding (West Germany) H-J Plötz	6	4	6
(United States) C Richey (Australia) R Ruffels	3	6	4
(Colombia) W Álvarez (Chile) P Rodríguez	3	7	3
5	(South Africa) C Drysdale (United Kingdom) R Taylor	6	5	6
(United States) R Barth (United States) T Gorman	10	8	19
(France) J-B Chanfreau (France) JL Rouyer	12	6	17
(Soviet Union) V Korotkov (Soviet Union) A Volkov	5	6	6
(United States) A Pattison (South Africa) T Ryan	7	2	4
(Austria) H Kary (Austria) P Pokorny	2	2
1	(Australia) J Newcombe (Australia) T Roche	6	6

Second round
3	(United States) R Lutz (United States) S Smith	6	6
(West Germany) I Buding (West Germany) H-J Plötz	4	2
(France) J-C Barclay (France) D Contet
5	(South Africa) C Drysdale (United Kingdom) R Taylor	w/o
7	(Netherlands) T Okker (United States) M Riessen	6	6
(United States) R Barth (United States) T Gorman	4	4
(Soviet Union) V Korotkov (Soviet Union) A Volkov	4	2
1	(Australia) J Newcombe (Australia) T Roche	6	6

Quarterfinals
3	(United States) R Lutz (United States) S Smith	9	8	7
5	(South Africa) C Drysdale (United Kingdom) R Taylor	7	10	5
7	(Netherlands) T Okker (United States) M Riessen	6	7
1	(Australia) J Newcombe (Australia) T Roche	4	5

Semifinals
3	(United States) R Lutz (United States) S Smith	4	4
7	(Netherlands) T Okker (United States) M Riessen	6	6
