= 1972 Queen's Club Championships =

- Date: 19–24 June
- Edition: 73rd
- Surface: Grass / outdoor
- Location: London, United Kingdom
- Venue: Queen's Club

Champions

Men's singles
- (United States) Jimmy Connors

Women's singles
- (United States) Chris Evert

Men's doubles
- (United States) Jim McManus / (United States) Jim Osborne

Women's doubles
- (United States) Rosie Casals / (United States) Billie Jean King
← 1971 ·	Queen's Club Championships	· 1973 →

The 1972 Queen's Club Championships, also known by its sponsored name Rothmans London Grass Court Championships, was a combined men's and women's tennis tournament played on grass courts at the Queen's Club in London in the United Kingdom that was part of the 1972 Commercial Union Assurance Grand Prix and the 1972 Virginia Slims Circuit. The tournament was held from 19 June through 24 June 1972. In the semifinal of the men's singles event 44-year old Pancho Gonzales was leading by a set against John Paish when he was disqualified by the tournament referee after an argument over the replacement of a linesman. Jimmy Connors and Chris Evert won the singles titles.

== Finals ==
=== Men's singles ===
(United States) Jimmy Connors defeated (United Kingdom) John Paish 6–2, 6–3

- It was Connors' 1st title of the year and the 1st of his career.

=== Women's singles ===
(United States) Chris Evert defeated (Australia) Karen Krantzcke 6–4, 6–0

- It was Evert's 3rd title of the year and the 7th of her career.

=== Men's doubles ===
(United States) Jim McManus / (United States) Jim Osborne defeated (West Germany) Jürgen Fassbender / (West Germany) Karl Meiler 4–6, 6–3, 7–5

- It was McManus' 2nd title of the year and the 4th of his career. It was Osborne's 2nd title of the year and the 5th of his career.

=== Women's doubles ===
(United States) Rosie Casals / (United States) Billie Jean King defeated (South Africa) Brenda Kirk / (South Africa) Pat Walkden 5–7, 6–0, 6–2

- It was Casals' 4th title of the year and the 14th of her career. It was King's 3rd title of the year and the 37th of her career.
