= 1972 Queen's Club Championships – Men's doubles =

Men's doubles
- 1972 Queen's Club Championships

Final
- Champions: (United States) Jim McManus (United States) Jim Osborne
- Runners-up: (West Germany) Jürgen Fassbender (West Germany) Karl Meiler
- Score: 4–6, 6–3, 7–5

Details
- Draw: 32

Events
Singles	men	women
Doubles	men	women
← 1971 ·	Queen's Club Championships	· 1973 →

Tom Okker and Marty Riessen were the defending champions, but did not participate this year.

Jim McManus and Jim Osborne won the title, defeating Jürgen Fassbender and Karl Meiler 4–6, 6–3, 7–5 in the final.

== Seeds ==
1. (United States) Stan Smith / (United States) Erik van Dillen (second round, withdrew)
2. (United States) Clark Graebner / (United States) Dick Stockton (first round)
3. (Soviet Union) Sergei Likhachev / (Soviet Union) Alex Metreveli (first round)
4. (India) Premjit Lall / (India) Jaidip Mukerjea (quarterfinals)

== Draw ==
=== Key ===
- Q = Qualifier
- WC = Wild card
- LL = Lucky loser
- Alt = Alternate
- SE = Special exempt
- PR = Protected ranking
- ITF = ITF entry
- JE = Junior exempt
- w/o = Walkover
- r = Retired
- d = Defaulted
- SR = Special ranking

=== Finals ===
Semifinals
(West Germany) Jürgen Fassbender (West Germany) Karl Meiler	8	8
(United States) Brian Gottfried (South Africa) Frew McMillan	6	6
(United States) Jim McManus (United States) Jim Osborne	6	6
(Australia) John Cooper (Australia) Neale Fraser	4	0

Final
(West Germany) Jürgen Fassbender (West Germany) Karl Meiler	6	3	5
(United States) Jim McManus (United States) Jim Osborne	4	6	7

=== Top half ===
First round
1	(United States) S Smith (United States) E van Dillen	6	6	7
(United Kingdom) B Mottram (Argentina) G Vilas	8	2	5
(United States) A Olmedo (United States) R Tanner	9	6
(South Africa) P Cramer (South Africa) R Moore	8	4
(Sweden) ON Bengtson (Czechoslovakia) V Zedník	8	6
(India) A Amritraj (India) V Amritraj	6	3
(West Germany) J Fassbender (West Germany) K Meiler	6	6
(Australia) K Fletcher (Brazil) JE Mandarino	4	2
4	(India) P Lall (India) J Mukerjea	6	8	6
(Colombia) I Molina (Socialist Federal Republic of Yugoslavia) N Špear	4	9	3
(Italy) A Panatta (Italy) N Pietrangeli	7	7
(United States) A Vincent (United States) G Mulloy	5	5
(France) J-C Barclay (Australia) B Phillips-Moore	w/o
(United States) J Connors (United States) T Gorman
(United States) B Gottfried (South Africa) F McMillan	6	6
(Soviet Union) T Kakoulia (West Germany) H-J Plötz	4	2

Second round
1	(United States) S Smith (United States) E van Dillen
(United States) A Olmedo (United States) R Tanner	w/o
(Sweden) ON Bengtson (Czechoslovakia) V Zedník	4	2
(West Germany) J Fassbender (West Germany) K Meiler	6	6
4	(India) P Lall (India) J Mukerjea	7	6
(Italy) A Panatta (Italy) N Pietrangeli	5	3
(France) J-C Barclay (Australia) B Phillips-Moore	3	4
(United States) B Gottfried (South Africa) F McMillan	6	6

Quarterfinals
(United States) A Olmedo (United States) R Tanner	8	6	3
(West Germany) J Fassbender (West Germany) K Meiler	9	3	6
4	(India) P Lall (India) J Mukerjea	1	8
(United States) B Gottfried (South Africa) F McMillan	6	9

Semifinals
(West Germany) J Fassbender (West Germany) K Meiler	8	8
(United States) B Gottfried (South Africa) F McMillan	6	6

=== Bottom half ===
First round
(United Kingdom) S Matthews (United Kingdom) S Warboys	4	5
(Australia) C Dibley (Australia) G Masters	6	7
(United Kingdom) J Feaver (New Zealand) O Parun	4	9	4
(United States) J McManus (United States) J Osborne	6	8	6
(Japan) J Kamiwazumi (Japan) T Sakai	6	2
(Australia) S Ball (Australia) J Bartlett	8	6
(Australia) P Doerner (Australia) R Keldie	6	6
3	(Soviet Union) S Likhachev (Soviet Union) A Metreveli	3	4
(Mexico) J Loyo-Mayo (Mexico) V Zarazúa	5	6	7
(South Africa) T Ryan (South Africa) D Schroder	7	4	5
(Italy) C Barazzutti (Italy) A Zugarelli	4	6
(United States) RP Gonzales	6	8
(Italy) P Bertolucci (Italy) E Di Matteo	4	9	6
(United Kingdom) D Lloyd (United Kingdom) J Paish	6	7	3
(Australia) J Cooper (Australia) N Fraser	6	3	6
2	(United States) C Graebner (United States) D Stockton	3	6	3

Second round
(Australia) C Dibley (Australia) G Masters	8	8	3
(United States) J McManus (United States) J Osborne	9	6	6
(Australia) S Ball (Australia) J Bartlett	1	9	6
(Australia) P Doerner (Australia) R Keldie	6	7	3
(Mexico) J Loyo-Mayo (Mexico) V Zarazúa	7	6
(United States) RP Gonzales	5	4
(Italy) P Bertolucci (Italy) E Di Matteo	4	5
(Australia) J Cooper (Australia) N Fraser	6	7

Quarterfinals
(United States) J McManus (United States) J Osborne	7	4	9
(Australia) S Ball (Australia) J Bartlett	5	6	7
(Mexico) J Loyo-Mayo (Mexico) V Zarazúa	6	3	12
(Australia) J Cooper (Australia) N Fraser	4	6	14

Semifinals
(United States) J McManus (United States) J Osborne	6	6
(Australia) J Cooper (Australia) N Fraser	4	0
