= 1979 Stella Artois Championships – Doubles =

Doubles
- 1979 Stella Artois Championships

Final
- Champions: (United States) Tim Gullikson (United States) Tom Gullikson
- Runners-up: (United States) Marty Riessen (United States) Sherwood Stewart
- Score: 6–4, 6–4

Details
- Draw: 32

Events
Singles	Doubles
← 1978 ·	Stella Artois Championships	· 1980 →

Bob Hewitt and Frew McMillan were the defending champions but only McMillan competed that year with Colin Dibley.

Dibley and McMillan lost in the second round to John Feaver and John James.

Tim Gullikson and Tom Gullikson won the doubles title at the 1979 Queen's Club Championships tennis tournament defeating Marty Riessen and Sherwood Stewart in the final 6–4, 6–4.

== Seeds ==
1. (United States) Peter Fleming / (United States) John McEnroe (first round)
2. (United States) Robert Lutz / (United States) Stan Smith (first round)
3. (United States) Marty Riessen / (United States) Sherwood Stewart (final)
4. (Australia) Mark Edmondson / (Australia) John Marks (first round)
5. (United States) Arthur Ashe / (United States) Dick Stockton (quarterfinals)
6. (Australia) John Alexander / (Australia) Phil Dent (first round)
7. (Australia) Ross Case / (Australia) Geoff Masters (second round)
8. (Australia) Colin Dibley / (South Africa) Frew McMillan (second round)

== Draw ==
=== Key ===
- Q = Qualifier
- WC = Wild card
- LL = Lucky loser
- Alt = Alternate
- SE = Special exempt
- PR = Protected ranking
- ITF = ITF entry
- JE = Junior exempt
- w/o = Walkover
- r = Retired
- d = Defaulted
- SR = Special ranking

=== Final ===
Semifinals
(United States) B Manson (Zimbabwe Rhodesia) A Pattison	4	2
3	(United States) Marty Riessen (United States) Sherwood Stewart	6	6
(United States) Victor Amaya (United States) Tom Gorman	5	3
(United States) Tim Gullikson (United States) Tom Gullikson	7	6

Final
3	(United States) Marty Riessen (United States) Sherwood Stewart	4	4
(United States) Tim Gullikson (United States) Tom Gullikson	6	6

=== Top half ===
First round
1	(United States) P Fleming (United States) J McEnroe	2	6
(United States) B Manson (Zimbabwe Rhodesia) A Pattison	6	7
(Australia) B Carmichael (United States) B Teacher	6	4	10
(United States) B Maze (United States) F Taygan	4	6	8
(Egypt) I El Shafei (United States) D Ralston	6	6
(United States) J Borowiak (United States) T Moor	3	4
(Paraguay) F González (South Africa) J Kriek	7	6
6	(Australia) J Alexander (Australia) P Dent	6	3
3	(United States) M Riessen (United States) S Stewart	7	5	6
(United States) M Cahill (United States) V Winitsky	6	7	3
(United Kingdom) M Cox (United Kingdom) D Lloyd	6	6
(United States) T Graham (United States) J Sadri	4	4
(United Kingdom) J Feaver (Australia) J James	7	6
(Paraguay) V Pecci (Ecuador) R Ycaza	6	3
(United States) P Du Pré (United States) B Gottfried	6	4	4
8	(Australia) C Dibley (South Africa) F McMillan	2	6	6

Second round
(United States) B Manson (Zimbabwe Rhodesia) A Pattison	6	4	6
(Australia) B Carmichael (United States) B Teacher	2	6	3
(Egypt) I El Shafei (United States) D Ralston	6	5	6
(Paraguay) F González (South Africa) J Kriek	3	7	4
3	(United States) M Riessen (United States) S Stewart	6	6	6
(United Kingdom) M Cox (United Kingdom) D Lloyd	7	4	3
(United Kingdom) J Feaver (Australia) J James	6	6
8	(Australia) C Dibley (South Africa) F McMillan	4	2

Quarterfinals
(United States) B Manson (Zimbabwe Rhodesia) A Pattison	6	3	6
(Egypt) I El Shafei (United States) D Ralston	4	6	3
3	(United States) M Riessen (United States) S Stewart	6	6
(United Kingdom) J Feaver (Australia) J James	4	2

Semifinals
(United States) B Manson (Zimbabwe Rhodesia) A Pattison	4	2
3	(United States) M Riessen (United States) S Stewart	6	6

=== Bottom half ===
First round
7	(Australia) R Case (Australia) G Masters	2	6	6
(India) A Amritraj (India) V Amritraj	6	4	4
(United States) V Amaya (United States) T Gorman	6	7
(United States) J Austin (United States) R Fisher	4	5
(Australia) P Kronk (Australia) C Letcher	6	4
(United Kingdom) R Drysdale (United Kingdom) R Lewis	7	6
(United Kingdom) J Lloyd (United Kingdom) B Mottram	6	0	7
4	(Australia) M Edmondson (Australia) J Marks	2	6	5
5	(United States) A Ashe (United States) D Stockton	6	6	6
(United States) H Pfister (United States) B Rowe	7	3	4
(Australia) B Giltinan (Australia) C Kachel	1	4
(South Africa) R Moore (United States) R Tanner	6	6
(United States) Tim Gullikson (United States) Tom Gullikson	6	7
(Australia) S Ball (Australia) K Warwick	3	6
(Chile) Á Fillol (Chile) J Fillol	6	6
2	(United States) R Lutz (United States) S Smith	3	3

Second round
7	(Australia) R Case (Australia) G Masters	6	6
(United States) V Amaya (United States) T Gorman	7	7
(United Kingdom) R Drysdale (United Kingdom) R Lewis	6	6
(United Kingdom) J Lloyd (United Kingdom) B Mottram	3	4
5	(United States) A Ashe (United States) D Stockton	7	6
(South Africa) R Moore (United States) R Tanner	6	3
(United States) Tim Gullikson (United States) Tom Gullikson	7	7
(Chile) Á Fillol (Chile) J Fillol	6	5

Quarterfinals
(United States) V Amaya (United States) T Gorman	7	7
(United Kingdom) R Drysdale (United Kingdom) R Lewis	6	6
5	(United States) A Ashe (United States) D Stockton	4	3
(United States) Tim Gullikson (United States) Tom Gullikson	6	6

Semifinals
(United States) V Amaya (United States) T Gorman	5	3
(United States) Tim Gullikson (United States) Tom Gullikson	7	6
