= 1977 Queen's Club Championships – Doubles =

Doubles
- 1977 Queen's Club Championships

Final
- Champions: (India) Anand Amritraj (India) Vijay Amritraj
- Runners-up: (United Kingdom) David Lloyd (United Kingdom) John Lloyd
- Score: 6–1, 6–2

Details
- Draw: 32

Events
Singles	Doubles
← 1973 ·	Queen's Club Championships	· 1978 →

Anand Amritraj and Vijay Amritraj won the doubles title at the 1977 Queen's Club Championships tennis tournament defeating David Lloyd and John Lloyd in the final 6–1, 6–2.

== Seeds ==
1. (South Africa) Bob Hewitt / (South Africa) Frew McMillan (first round)
2. (United States) Robert Lutz / (United States) Stan Smith (quarterfinals)
3. (United States) Fred McNair / (United States) Sherwood Stewart (first round)
4. (Italy) Adriano Panatta / (Mexico) Raúl Ramírez (first round)
5. (Australia) Ray Ruffels / (Australia) Allan Stone (first round)
6. (United States) Charlie Pasarell / (United States) Erik van Dillen (first round)
7. (United States) Marty Riessen / (United States) Roscoe Tanner (semifinals)
8. (United States) Pat DuPré / (Socialist Federal Republic of Yugoslavia) Nikola Pilić (first round)

== Draw ==
=== Key ===
- Q = Qualifier
- WC = Wild card
- LL = Lucky loser
- Alt = Alternate
- SE = Special exempt
- PR = Protected ranking
- ITF = ITF entry
- JE = Junior exempt
- w/o = Walkover
- r = Retired
- d = Defaulted
- SR = Special ranking

=== Final ===
Semifinals
7	(United States) Marty Riessen (United States) Roscoe Tanner	1	6	4
(India) Anand Amritraj (India) Vijay Amritraj	6	2	6
(Australia) John Alexander (Australia) Phil Dent
(United Kingdom) David Lloyd (United Kingdom) John Lloyd	w/o

Final
(India) Anand Amritraj (India) Vijay Amritraj	6	6
(United Kingdom) David Lloyd (United Kingdom) John Lloyd	1	2

=== Top half ===
First round
1	(South Africa) B Hewitt (South Africa) F McMillan	4	7	9
(United States) B Martin (New Zealand) O Parun	6	5	11
(Australia) C Dibley (Australia) M Edmondson	4	7	4
(United Kingdom) J Feaver (United Kingdom) R Taylor	6	5	6
(Australia) B Carmichael (United States) B Teacher	9	4	6
(United States) P Fleming (United States) G Mayer	7	6	4
(United States) J Borowiak (Rhodesia) A Pattison	3	4
7	(United States) M Riessen (United States) R Tanner	6	6
4	(Italy) A Panatta (Mexico) R Ramírez	3	3
(India) A Amritraj (India) V Amritraj	6	6
(Australia) S Ball (Australia) K Warwick	4	9	8
(Australia) D Crealy (Chile) J Fillol	6	8	6
(United States) M Estep (United States) N Saviano	1	2
(Romania) I Năstase (Romania) I Țiriac	6	6
(United States) Tim Gullikson (United States) Tom Gullikson	6	6
6	(United States) C Pasarell (United States) E van Dillen	3	4

Second round
(United States) B Martin (New Zealand) O Parun	9	8
(United Kingdom) J Feaver (United Kingdom) R Taylor	8	6
(Australia) B Carmichael (United States) B Teacher	3	6	3
7	(United States) M Riessen (United States) R Tanner	6	2	6
(India) A Amritraj (India) V Amritraj	6	9
(Australia) S Ball (Australia) K Warwick	4	8
(Romania) I Năstase (Romania) I Țiriac	6	9
(United States) Tim Gullikson (United States) Tom Gullikson	4	8

Quarterfinals
(United States) B Martin (New Zealand) O Parun	8	2
7	(United States) M Riessen (United States) R Tanner	9	6
(India) A Amritraj (India) V Amritraj	6	9
(Romania) I Năstase (Romania) I Țiriac	4	7

Semifinals
7	(United States) M Riessen (United States) R Tanner	1	6	4
(India) A Amritraj (India) V Amritraj	6	2	6

=== Bottom half ===
First round
5	(Australia) R Ruffels (Australia) A Stone	8	9	3
(Egypt) I El Shafei (New Zealand) B Fairlie	9	7	6
(Australia) P Kronk (Australia) C Letcher	6	7
(United States) T Gorman (United States) D Ralston	3	5
(United States) J Delaney (India) S Menon	3	4
(Australia) J Alexander (Australia) P Dent	6	6
(South Africa) B Bertram (United Kingdom) B Mitton	6	6
3	(United States) F McNair (United States) S Stewart	1	2
8	(United States) P DuPré (Socialist Federal Republic of Yugoslavia) N Pilić	2	3
(United Kingdom) R Drysdale (United Kingdom) R Lewis	6	6
(South Africa) R Moore (United States) B Scanlon	9	1	4
(United Kingdom) D Lloyd (United Kingdom) J Lloyd	7	6	6
(United Kingdom) M Cox (United States) H Solomon
(Australia) R Case (Australia) G Masters	w/o
(United States) H Pfister (United States) B Walts	6	6	7
2	(United States) R Lutz (United States) S Smith	8	3	9

Second round
(Egypt) I El Shafei (New Zealand) B Fairlie	6	9
(Australia) P Kronk (Australia) C Letcher	1	8
(Australia) J Alexander (Australia) P Dent	6	6
(South Africa) B Bertram (South Africa) B Mitton	4	2
(United Kingdom) R Drysdale (United Kingdom) R Lewis	8	6	3
(United Kingdom) D Lloyd (United Kingdom) J Lloyd	9	4	6
(Australia) R Case (Australia) G Masters	7	6	4
2	(United States) R Lutz (United States) S Smith	9	4	6

Quarterfinals
(Egypt) I El Shafei (New Zealand) B Fairlie	8	4
(Australia) J Alexander (Australia) P Dent	9	6
(United Kingdom) D Lloyd (United Kingdom) J Lloyd	8	6
2	(United States) R Lutz (United States) S Smith	6	2

Semifinals
(Australia) J Alexander (Australia) P Dent
(United Kingdom) D Lloyd (United Kingdom) J Lloyd	w/o
