= 1970 Queen's Club Championships =

Tennis tournament

- Date: 15–20 June
- Edition: 71st
- Category: Independent
- Prize money: £4,460
- Surface: Grass / outdoor
- Location: London, United Kingdom
- Venue: Queen's Club

Champions

Men's singles
- (Australia) Rod Laver

Women's singles
- (Australia) Margaret Court

Men's doubles
- (Netherlands) Tom Okker / (United States) Marty Riessen

Women's doubles
- (United States) Rosie Casals / (United States) Billie-Jean King

Mixed doubles
- (United Kingdom) Winnie Shaw / (Australia) Owen Davidson
← 1969 ·	Queen's Club Championships	· 1971 →

The 1970 Queen's Club Championships, also known by its sponsored name Rothmans Open London Grass Court Championships, was a combined men's and women's tennis tournament played on grass courts at the Queen's Club in London in the United Kingdom. It was a non-tour event, i.e. not part of the 1970 Pepsi-Cola Grand Prix or 1970 World Championship Tennis circuit . It was the 71st edition of the tournament and was held from 15 June through 20 June 1970. First-seeded Rod Laver and Margaret Court won the singles titles. In the final Court was 2–6, 0–5 and 0–15 down against Winnie Shaw but recovered by winning 14 of the last 17 games.

== Finals ==
=== Men's singles ===
(Australia) Rod Laver defeated (Australia) John Newcombe 6–4, 6–3

- It was Laver's 3rd title of the year and the 15th of his professional career.

=== Women's singles ===
(Australia) Margaret Court defeated (United Kingdom) Winnie Shaw 2–6, 8–6, 6–2

=== Men's doubles ===
(Netherlands) Tom Okker / (United States) Marty Riessen defeated (United States) Arthur Ashe / (United States) Charlie Pasarell 6–4, 6–4

- It was Okker's 1st title of the year and the 10th of his career. It was Riessen's 2nd title of the year and the 7th of his career.

=== Women's doubles ===
(United States) Rosie Casals / (United States) Billie-Jean King defeated (Australia) Karen Krantzcke / (Australia) Kerry Melville 6–4, 6–3

=== Mixed doubles ===
(United Kingdom) Winnie Shaw / (Australia) Owen Davidson defeated (Australia) Evonne Goolagong / (Australia) Bob Giltinan 8–6, 13–11
