= 1970 Queen's Club Championships – Men's singles =

Men's singles
- 1970 Queen's Club Championships

Final
- Champion: (Australia) Rod Laver
- Runner-up: (Australia) John Newcombe
- Score: 6–4, 6–3

Details
- Draw: 64
- Seeds: 8

Events
Singles	men	women
Doubles	men	women
← 1969 ·	Queen's Club Championships	· 1971 →

Fred Stolle was the defending champion, but did not participate this year.

Rod Laver won the singles title at the 1970 Queen's Club Championships tennis tournament, defeating countryman John Newcombe 6–4, 6–3 in the final.

== Seeds ==
1. (Australia) Rod Laver (champion)
2. (Australia) John Newcombe (final)
3. (Netherlands) Tom Okker (second round)
4. (United Kingdom) Roger Taylor (second round)
5. (United States) Marty Riessen (semifinals)
6. (United States) Dennis Ralston (third round)
7. (United States) Clark Graebner (second round)
8. (Spain) Manuel Orantes (second round)

== Draw ==
=== Key ===
- Q = Qualifier
- WC = Wild card
- LL = Lucky loser
- Alt = Alternate
- ITF = ITF entry
- PR = Protected ranking
- SR = Special ranking
- SE = Special exempt
- JE = Junior exempt
- JR = Junior Accelerator Programme entrant
- CO = College Accelerator Programme entrant
- NG = Next Gen Accelerator Program entrant
- w/o = Walkover
- r = Retired
- d = Defaulted

=== Finals ===
Semifinals
1	(Australia) Rod Laver	6	6
(United States) Cliff Richey	3	1
5	(United States) Marty Riessen	6	4	8
2	(Australia) John Newcombe	2	6	10

Final
1	(Australia) Rod Laver	6	6
2	(Australia) John Newcombe	4	3

=== Top half ===
==== Section 1 ====
First round
1	(Australia) R Laver	6	6
(United States) J Osborne	3	4
(United States) R Holmberg	9	8
(India) P Lall	11	10
(Chile) P Cornejo	1	4
(United States) R Lutz	6	6
(Japan) K Watanabe	4	5
(Czechoslovakia) Š Koudelka	6	7
(Soviet Union) T Leius	6	3	4
(France) JL Rouyer	4	6	6
(South Africa) C Drysdale	6	6
(Austria) H Kary	3	2
(Australia) D Crealy	6	3	6
(Colombia) W Álvarez	1	6	0
(Australia) Alan Kendal	3	4
7	(United States) C Graebner	6	6

Second round
1	(Australia) R Laver	6	6
(India) P Lall	3	4
(United States) R Lutz	6	6
(Czechoslovakia) Š Koudelka	3	4
(France) JL Rouyer	4	0
(South Africa) C Drysdale	6	6
(Australia) D Crealy	6	1	6
7	(United States) C Graebner	2	6	0

Third round
1	(Australia) R Laver	6	8
(United States) R Lutz	1	6
(South Africa) C Drysdale	4	1
(Australia) D Crealy	6	6

Quarterfinals
1	(Australia) R Laver	6	6
(Australia) D Crealy	1	4

==== Section 2 ====
First round
3	(Netherlands) T Okker	6	6
(Australia) P Dent	3	3
(United States) R Barth	3	9
(India) J Mukherjea	6	11
(United Kingdom) B Mottram	2	1
(United States) C Richey	6	6
(Ecuador) P Guzmán	w/o
(Australia) R Emerson
(West Germany) J Fassbender
(France) G Goven	w/o
(Australia) B Bowrey	6	3	4
(South Africa) T Ryan	4	6	6
(Mexico) J Loyo-Mayo	4	6	6
(New Zealand) John McDonald	6	2	2
(France) B Montrenaud	6	2
6	(United States) D Ralston	8	6

Second round
3	(Netherlands) T Okker	2	6	7
(India) J Mukherjea	6	2	9
(United States) C Richey	w/o
(Ecuador) P Guzmán
(France) G Goven	7	4	6
(South Africa) T Ryan	5	6	3
(Mexico) J Loyo-Mayo	6	2
6	(United States) D Ralston	8	6

Third round
(India) J Mukherjea	2	5
(United States) C Richey	6	7
(France) G Goven	4	8	8
6	(United States) D Ralston	6	6	6

Quarterfinals
(United States) C Richey	6	6
(France) G Goven	4	3

=== Bottom half ===
==== Section 3 ====
First round
5	(United States) M Riessen	11	6
(Australia) B Giltinan	9	4
(Brazil) T Koch
(Soviet Union) V Korotkov	w/o
(United Kingdom) R Wilson	6	7
(United States) S Smith	8	9
(Spain) A Muñoz	6	2	4
(Australia) R Ruffels	2	6	6
(South Africa) F McMillan	6	6
(United States) J McManus	3	4
(West Germany) H-J Plötz	w/o
(New Zealand) B Fairlie
(Soviet Union) A Metreveli	w/o
(Belgium) P Hombergen
(France) F Jauffret
4	(United Kingdom) R Taylor	w/o

Second round
5	(United States) M Riessen	6	6
(Soviet Union) V Korotkov	2	2
(United States) S Smith	6	6
(Australia) R Ruffels	4	4
(South Africa) F McMillan	7	10
(West Germany) H-J Plötz	5	8
(Soviet Union) A Metreveli	4	6	8
4	(United Kingdom) R Taylor	6	3	6

Third round
5	(United States) M Riessen	10	6
(United States) S Smith	8	2
(South Africa) F McMillan	9	6
(Soviet Union) A Metreveli	7	4

Quarterfinals
5	(United States) M Riessen	6	6
(South Africa) F McMillan	1	0

==== Section 4 ====
First round
8	(Spain) M Orantes	3	6	6
(Austria) P Pokorny	6	2	1
(Soviet Union) S Likhachev	4	4
(Australia) O Davidson	6	6
(United States) A Pattison	7	6
(Australia) J Alexander	5	4
(France) J-B Chanfreau	3	7
(United States) C Pasarell	6	9
(Australia) L Hoad
(Jamaica) R Russell	w/o
(United Arab Republic) I El Shafei	2	3
(United States) T Gorman	6	6
(France) D Contet	6	6	6
(West Germany) I Buding	8	3	3
(Soviet Union) A Volkov	4	9	2
2	(Australia) J Newcombe	6	7	6

Second round
8	(Spain) M Orantes	4	6	3
(Australia) O Davidson	6	1	6
(United States) A Pattison	3	7
(United States) C Pasarell	6	9
(Jamaica) R Russell	5	4
(United States) T Gorman	7	6
(France) D Contet	3	6	3
2	(Australia) J Newcombe	6	1	6

Third round
(Australia) O Davidson	4	6	7
(United States) C Pasarell	6	4	9
(United States) T Gorman	6	8	2
2	(Australia) J Newcombe	3	10	6

Quarterfinals
(United States) C Pasarell	1	2
2	(Australia) J Newcombe	6	6
