= 1972 Queen's Club Championships – Men's singles =

Men's singles
- 1972 Queen's Club Championships

Final
- Champion: (United States) Jimmy Connors
- Runner-up: (United Kingdom) John Paish
- Score: 6–2, 6–3

Details
- Draw: 64

Events
| Singles | men | women |
| Doubles | men | women |
| ← 1971 · | Queen's Club Championships | · 1973 → |

Stan Smith was the defending champion, but lost in the quarterfinals this year.

Jimmy Connors won the title, defeating John Paish 6–2, 6–3 in the final.

== Draw ==
=== Key ===
- Q = Qualifier
- WC = Wild card
- LL = Lucky loser
- Alt = Alternate
- SE = Special exempt
- PR = Protected ranking
- ITF = ITF entry
- JE = Junior exempt
- w/o = Walkover
- r = Retired
- d = Defaulted
- SR = Special ranking

=== Finals ===
Semifinals
(United Kingdom) John Paish | 5 | 3
(United States) Pancho Gonzales | 7 | 2^{r}
(United States) Jimmy Connors | 6 | 6
(United States) Clark Graebner | 3 | 4

Final
(United Kingdom) John Paish | 2 | 3
(United States) Jimmy Connors | 6 | 6

=== Top half ===
==== Section 1 ====
First round
(United States) S Smith | 7 | 6
(Italy) A Zugarelli | 5 | 4
(South Africa) F McMillan | 6 | 6
(Australia) B Phillips-Moore | 4 | 4
(Australia) R Keldie | 9 | 7
(Italy) E Di Matteo | 7 | 5
(Austria) H Kary | 7 | 3 | 6
(India) A Amritraj | 5 | 6 | 4
(United States) T Gorman | 6 | 6
(Australia) S Ball | 3 | 4
(Italy) P Bertolucci | 6 | 6
(United States) H Solomon | 4 | 4
(United States) J Osborne | 9 | 1 | 1
(United Kingdom) J Paish | 8 | 6 | 6
(South Africa) R Moore | 8 | 4 | 6
(India) V Amritraj | 6 | 6 | 4

Second round
(United States) S Smith | 6 | 6
(South Africa) F McMillan | 4 | 4
(Australia) R Keldie | 6 | 6
(Austria) H Kary | 2 | 3
(United States) T Gorman | 3 | 6 | 7^{r}
(Italy) P Bertolucci | 6 | 2 | 8
(United Kingdom) J Paish | 6 | 6
(South Africa) R Moore | 1 | 2

Third round
(United States) S Smith | 3 | 6 | 6
(Australia) R Keldie | 6 | 4 | 2
(Italy) P Bertolucci | 6 | 0
(United Kingdom) J Paish | 8 | 6

Quarterfinals
(United States) S Smith | 6 | 3 | 8
(United Kingdom) J Paish | 2 | 6 | 10

==== Section 2 ====
First round
(United States) RP Gonzales | 6 | 6
(South Africa) D Schroder | 3 | 2
(Australia) G Masters | 6 | 9
(United States) A Olmedo | 1 | 8
(United States) D Stockton | 9 | 8
(United Kingdom) B Mottram | 7 | 6
(Japan) T Sakai | 8 | 4 | 6
(West Germany) K Meiler | 6 | 6 | 8
(Italy) A Panatta | 5 | 2
(Belgium) B Mignot | 7 | 6
(United Kingdom) D Lloyd | 6 | 6
(United States) J McManus | 4 | 4
(Soviet Union) S Likhachev | 4 | 3
(Sweden) ON Bengtson | 6 | 6
(United States) R Tanner | w/o
(West Germany) J Fassbender

Second round
(United States) RP Gonzales | 6 | 1 | 6
(Australia) G Masters | 4 | 6 | 3
(United States) D Stockton | 3 | 2
(West Germany) K Meiler | 6 | 6
(Belgium) B Mignot | 1 | 6 | 6
(United Kingdom) D Lloyd | 6 | 3 | 3
(Sweden) ON Bengtson | 5 | 6 | 3
(United States) R Tanner | 7 | 3 | 6

Third round
(United States) RP Gonzales | 6 | 9
(West Germany) K Meiler | 4 | 7
(Belgium) B Mignot | 3 | 7
(United States) R Tanner | 6 | 9

Quarterfinals
(United States) RP Gonzales | 7 | 6
(United States) R Tanner | 5 | 1

=== Bottom half ===
==== Section 3 ====
First round
(Argentina) G Vilas | 4 | 3
(India) J Mukerjea | 6 | 6
(Australia) J Cooper | 8 | 7
(United Kingdom) J Feaver | 6 | 5
(Australia) N Fraser | 3 | 6 | 6
(Italy) C Barazzutti | 6 | 3 | 3
(Czechoslovakia) V Zedník | 6 | 3 | 3
(United States) J Connors | 4 | 6 | 6
(South Africa) T Ryan | w/o
(United States) V Seixas
(United States) B Gottfried | 6 | 6
(Japan) J Kamiwazumi | 4 | 4
(Australia) P Doerner | w/o
(Mexico) J Loyo-Mayo
(New Zealand) O Parun | 6 | 4
(Soviet Union) A Metreveli | 8 | 6

Second round
(India) J Mukerjea | 4 | 6 | 6
(Australia) J Cooper | 6 | 3 | 8
(Australia) N Fraser | 5 | 8
(United States) J Connors | 7 | 9
(South Africa) T Ryan | 3 | 5
(United States) B Gottfried | 6 | 7
(Australia) P Doerner | 6 | 2 | 3
(Soviet Union) A Metreveli | 0 | 6 | 6

Third round
(Australia) J Cooper | 3 | 3
(United States) J Connors | 6 | 6
(United States) B Gottfried | 6 | 8 | 4
(Soviet Union) A Metreveli | 4 | 9 | 6

Quarterfinals
(United States) J Connors | 6 | 6 | 9
(Soviet Union) A Metreveli | 8 | 1 | 7

==== Section 4 ====
First round
(South Africa) P Cramer | 6 | 6
(Colombia) I Molina | 2 | 3
(United Kingdom) S Warboys | 4 | 3
(Australia) C Dibley | 6 | 6
(Soviet Union) T Kakoulia | 6 | 6
(Australia) J Bartlett | 3 | 4
(Socialist Federal Republic of Yugoslavia) B Jovanović
(India) P Lall | w/o
(United States) E van Dillen | 6 | 6
(Italy) N Pietrangeli | 4 | 3
(United Kingdom) S Matthews | 6 | 6
(West Germany) H-J Plötz | 3 | 1
(Brazil) JE Mandarino | 2 | 6 | 3
(Socialist Federal Republic of Yugoslavia) N Špear | 6 | 4 | 6
(France) J-C Barclay | 2 | 2
(United States) C Graebner | 6 | 6

Second round
(South Africa) P Cramer | 5 | 3
(Australia) C Dibley | 7 | 6
(Soviet Union) T Kakoulia | 3 | 2
(India) P Lall | 6 | 6
(United States) E van Dillen | 3 | 6 | 2
(United Kingdom) S Matthews | 6 | 2 | 6
(Socialist Federal Republic of Yugoslavia) N Špear | 5 | 6 | 5
(United States) C Graebner | 7 | 2 | 7

Third round
(Australia) C Dibley | 6 | 6
(India) P Lall | 4 | 4
(United Kingdom) S Matthews | 4 | 1
(United States) C Graebner | 6 | 6

Quarterfinals
(Australia) C Dibley | 6 | 3 | 4
(United States) C Graebner | 3 | 6 | 6
