= 1971 Queen's Club Championships – Men's singles =

Men's singles
- 1971 Queen's Club Championships

Final
- Champion: (United States) Stan Smith
- Runner-up: (Australia) John Newcombe
- Score: 8–6, 6–3

Details
- Draw: 56

Events
Singles	men	women
Doubles	men	women
← 1970 ·	Queen's Club Championships	· 1972 →

Rod Laver was the defending champion, but lost in the quarterfinals this year against Tom Gorman.

Stan Smith won the men's singles title at the 1971 Queen's Club Championships tennis tournament, defeating John Newcombe 8–6, 6–3 in the final.

== Draw ==
=== Key ===
- Q = Qualifier
- WC = Wild card
- LL = Lucky loser
- Alt = Alternate
- SE = Special exempt
- PR = Protected ranking
- ITF = ITF entry
- JE = Junior exempt
- w/o = Walkover
- r = Retired
- d = Defaulted
- SR = Special ranking

=== Finals ===
Semifinals
(Australia) John Newcombe	6	6
(Australia) Owen Davidson	4	4
(United States) Stan Smith	7	9
(United States) Tom Gorman	5	8

Final
(Australia) John Newcombe	6	3
(United States) Stan Smith	8	6

=== Top half ===
==== Section 1 ====
First round
(United Kingdom) R Taylor	2	3
(Australia) F Sedgman	6	6
(Czechoslovakia) J Kodeš	2	3
(United Kingdom) B Mottram	6	6
(United States) F Froehling	6	3	4
(Australia) R Case	3	6	6
(United Kingdom) J Paish	6	6
(Hungary) S Baranyi	2	2

Second round
(Australia) J Newcombe	w/o
(Hungary) I Gulyás
(Socialist Federal Republic of Yugoslavia) N Špear	2	1
(United States) C Graebner	6	6
(Australia) F Sedgman	6	6	4
(United Kingdom) B Mottram	8	4	6
(Australia) R Case	6	8
(United Kingdom) J Paish	3	6

Third round
(Australia) J Newcombe	8	6
(United States) C Graebner	6	4
(United Kingdom) B Mottram	4	5
(Australia) R Case	6	7

Quarterfinals
(Australia) J Newcombe	6	9
(Australia) R Case	2	8

==== Section 2 ====
First round
(United States) A Fox	6	3	2
(Czechoslovakia) Š Koudelka	4	6	6
(South Africa) R Moore	6	6
(Australia) J Alexander	4	4
(United Arab Republic) I El Shafei	6	4	2
(South Africa) F McMillan	2	6	6
(South Africa) A Segal
(Australia) O Davidson	w/o
(United States) C Richey	6	6
(United Kingdom) P Curtis	1	1
(United States) J Osborne
(Australia) P Dent	w/o
(United States) J McManus	4	6	4
(South Africa) C Drysdale	6	4	6
(United Kingdom) R Wilson
(Australia) R Emerson	w/o

Second round
(Czechoslovakia) Š Koudelka	2	6
(South Africa) R Moore	6	8
(South Africa) F McMillan	4	3
(Australia) O Davidson	6	6
(United States) C Richey	6	6
(Australia) P Dent	1	0
(South Africa) C Drysdale	2	2
(Australia) R Emerson	6	6

Third round
(South Africa) R Moore	6	4	6
(Australia) O Davidson	4	6	8
(United States) C Richey	9	4	5
(Australia) R Emerson	8	6	7

Quarterfinals
(Australia) O Davidson	7	6
(Australia) R Emerson	5	3

=== Bottom half ===
==== Section 3 ====
First round
(New Zealand) B Fairlie	6	8
(Australia) K Fletcher	0	6
(United States) RP Gonzales	9	6
(Italy) A Panatta	8	3
(Australia) B Bowrey	1	2
(United States) R Lutz	6	6
(Australia) R Keldie	3	1
(United States) M Riessen	6	6
(Australia) B Carmichael	7	3
(United States) C Pasarell	9	6
(Austria) H Kary	1	5
(Australia) R Ruffels	6	7
(United Kingdom) G Battrick	5	6	6
(United States) E van Dillen	7	4	2
(New Zealand) O Parun	1	4
(United States) S Smith	6	6

Second round
(New Zealand) B Fairlie	7	3
(United States) RP Gonzales	9	6
(United States) R Lutz	7	6	5
(United States) M Riessen	9	3	7
(United States) C Pasarell	2	2
(Australia) R Ruffels	6	6
(United Kingdom) G Battrick	3	3
(United States) S Smith	6	6

Third round
(United States) RP Gonzales	3	2
(United States) M Riessen	6	6
(Australia) R Ruffels	3	4
(United States) S Smith	6	6

Quarterfinals
(United States) M Riessen	4	5
(United States) S Smith	6	7

==== Section 4 ====
First round
(Soviet Union) A Metreveli	6	9
(Hungary) P Szőke	4	8
(Australia) C Dibley	8	3
(United States) T Gorman	9	6
(Australia) T Addison	6	6
(United States) Gerry Perry	4	4
(Colombia) W Álvarez	3	3
(United States) D Ralston	6	6

Second round
(Soviet Union) A Metreveli	6	3	6
(United States) T Gorman	2	6	8
(Australia) T Addison	6	7
(United States) D Ralston	4	5
(Socialist Federal Republic of Yugoslavia) Ž Franulović	6	6
(Czechoslovakia) F Pala	3	4
(Hungary) R Machán
(Australia) R Laver	w/o

Third round
(United States) T Gorman	8	6
(Australia) T Addison	6	3
(Socialist Federal Republic of Yugoslavia) Ž Franulović	6	3	4
(Australia) R Laver	4	6	6

Quarterfinals
(United States) T Gorman	6	4	6
(Australia) R Laver	4	6	1
