= 1980 Stella Artois Championships – Singles =

Singles
- 1980 Stella Artois Championships

Final
- Champion: (United States) John McEnroe
- Runner-up: (Australia) Kim Warwick
- Score: 6–3, 6–1

Details
- Draw: 64
- Seeds: 16

Events
Singles	Doubles
← 1979 ·	Queen's Club Championships	· 1981 →

John McEnroe was the defending champion and won the singles title at the 1980 Queen's Club Championships tennis tournament defeating Kim Warwick in the final 6–3, 6–1.

== Seeds ==
1. (United States) John McEnroe (champion)
2. (United States) Vitas Gerulaitis (semifinals)
3. (United States) ~~Harold Solomon~~ (withdrew)
4. (United States) Roscoe Tanner (quarterfinals)
5. (Paraguay) Víctor Pecci (semifinals)
6. (United States) Peter Fleming (first round)
7. (United States) Pat DuPré (first round)
8. (United States) Victor Amaya (second round)
9. (United States) Stan Smith (quarterfinals)
10. (United States) John Sadri (third round)
11. (United States) Brian Teacher (second round)
12. (United States) Tim Gullikson (second round)
13. (United States) Brian Gottfried (third round)
14. (Mexico) Raúl Ramírez (second round)
15. (South Africa) Johan Kriek (second round)
16. (India) Vijay Amritraj (quarterfinals)

== Draw ==
=== Key ===
- Q = Qualifier
- WC = Wild card
- LL = Lucky loser
- Alt = Alternate
- SE = Special exempt
- PR = Protected ranking
- ITF = ITF entry
- JE = Junior exempt
- w/o = Walkover
- r = Retired
- d = Defaulted
- SR = Special ranking

=== Finals ===
Semifinals
1	(United States) John McEnroe	6	6
5	(Paraguay) Víctor Pecci	4	0
(Australia) Kim Warwick	6	6
2	(United States) Vitas Gerulaitis	3	4

Final
1	(United States) John McEnroe	6	6
(Australia) Kim Warwick	3	1

=== Top half ===
==== Section 1 ====
First round
1	(United States) J McEnroe	6	6
(United States) T Leonard	3	4
(Australia) P McNamee	6	6
(Australia) G Masters	2	2
(South Africa) K Curren	4	6	6
(United States) S Mayer	6	4	4
(Australia) J James	6	5	3
13	(United States) B Gottfried	4	7	6
16	(India) V Amritraj	5	6	6
(United States) R Lutz	7	2	0
(United Kingdom) R Lewis	4	6	7
(United States) C Mayotte	6	4	5
(United States) D Stockton	6	6
(Israel) S Glickstein	3	3
(United States) B Manson	7	6	3
8	(United States) V Amaya	6	7	6

Second round
1	(United States) J McEnroe	6	7
(Australia) P McNamee	4	5
(South Africa) K Curren	4	6	5
13	(United States) B Gottfried	6	2	7
16	(India) V Amritraj	6	6
(United Kingdom) R Lewis	2	1
(United States) D Stockton
8	(United States) V Amaya	d

Third round
1	(United States) J McEnroe	7	7
13	(United States) B Gottfried	6	6
16	(India) V Amritraj	7	3	10
(United States) D Stockton	6	6	8

Quarterfinals
1	(United States) J McEnroe	6	6
16	(India) V Amritraj	2	2

==== Section 2 ====
First round
4	(United States) R Tanner	3	6	9
(Australia) R Frawley	6	1	7
(United States) T Waltke	6	6
(United States) C Delaney	1	3
(Australia) J Alexander	7	7
(United Kingdom) A Jarrett	6	6
Q	(Australia) D Collings	2	3
10	(United States) J Sadri	6	6
12	(United States) Tim Gullikson	6	6
(United States) E van Dillen	3	4
(Ecuador) A Gómez	6	7
(United States) R Van't Hof	3	5
(Australia) P Dent	6	6	6
(Brazil) T Koch	4	7	2
(South Africa) R Trogolo	7	3	2
5	(Paraguay) V Pecci	5	6	6

Second round
4	(United States) R Tanner	6	6
(United States) T Waltke	0	3
(Australia) J Alexander	2	4
10	(United States) J Sadri	6	6
12	(United States) Tim Gullikson	6	4	7
(Ecuador) A Gómez	3	6	9
(Australia) P Dent	4	7	2
5	(Paraguay) V Pecci	6	6	6

Third round
4	(United States) R Tanner	6	2	6
10	(United States) J Sadri	4	6	3
(Ecuador) A Gómez	6	4
5	(Paraguay) V Pecci	7	6

Quarterfinals
4	(United States) R Tanner	3	7	4
5	(Paraguay) V Pecci	6	5	6

=== Bottom half ===
==== Section 3 ====
First round
6	(United States) P Fleming	4	4
Q	(United States) N Saviano	6	6
Q	(Australia) C Johnstone	6	7
(United States) T Gorman	1	6
(United States) P Rennert	6	2	6
(United States) T Wilkison	4	6	4
(Paraguay) F González	0	1
15	(South Africa) J Kriek	6	6
11	(United States) B Teacher	6	6
(Australia) R Case	4	4
(Austria) P Feigl	6	6
(New Zealand) C Lewis	4	2
(Australia) K Warwick	6	4	6
(South Africa) B Mitton	1	6	4
(United States) J Austin	3	2
LL	(United States) B Martin	6	6

Second round
Q	(United States) N Saviano	7	6
Q	(Australia) C Johnstone	5	4
(United States) P Rennert	7	3	6
15	(South Africa) J Kriek	6	6	0
11	(United States) B Teacher	5	4
(Austria) P Feigl	7	6
(Australia) K Warwick	6	4	6
LL	(United States) B Martin	1	6	1

Third round
Q	(United States) N Saviano	3	3
(United States) P Rennert	6	6
(Austria) P Feigl	0	0
(Australia) K Warwick	6	6

Quarterfinals
(United States) P Rennert	3	2
(Australia) K Warwick	6	6

==== Section 4 ====
First round
7	(United States) P DuPré	6	4	6
Q	(United States) Tom Gullikson	4	6	8
(Australia) B Drewett	7	2	7
(United States) H Pfister	6	6	5
(Australia) M Edmondson	6	7
(United States) F Taygan	4	5
(United States) V Van Patten	3	7	2
9	(United States) S Smith	6	5	6
14	(Mexico) R Ramírez	6	7
(Australia) T Rocavert	3	5
(United States) F Buehning	6	3	6
(Australia) C Dibley	4	6	3
Q	(United States) S Stewart	6	7
Q	(New Zealand) R Simpson	4	5
(South Africa) B Bertram	3	6
2	(United States) V Gerulaitis	6	7

Second round
Q	(United States) Tom Gullikson	6	6
(Australia) B Drewett	3	4
(Australia) M Edmondson	2	4
9	(United States) S Smith	6	6
14	(Mexico) R Ramírez	6	7	3
(United States) F Buehning	7	5	6
Q	(United States) S Stewart	5	3
2	(United States) V Gerulaitis	7	6

Third round
Q	(United States) Tom Gullikson	4	3
9	(United States) S Smith	6	6
(United States) F Buehning	4	6	4
2	(United States) V Gerulaitis	6	2	6

Quarterfinals
9	(United States) S Smith	5	6	1
2	(United States) V Gerulaitis	7	4	6
