= 1979 Stella Artois Championships – Singles =

Singles
- 1979 Stella Artois Championships

Final
- Champion: (United States) John McEnroe
- Runner-up: (Paraguay) Víctor Pecci
- Score: 6–7, 6–1, 6–1

Details
- Draw: 64
- Seeds: 16

Events
Singles	Doubles
← 1978 ·	Stella Artois Championships	· 1980 →

The 1979 Queen's Club Championships (known for sponsorship as the Stella Artois Championships) was a men's tennis tournament played on outdoor grass courts at the Queen's Club in London in the United Kingdom that was part of the 1979 Colgate-Palmolive Grand Prix circuit. It was the 77th edition of the tournament and was held from 11 June through 17 June 1979.

Tony Roche was the defending champion but did not compete that year. Second-seeded John McEnroe won the singles title, defeating Víctor Pecci in the final 6–7, 6–1, 6–1.

== Seeds ==
1. (United States) ~~Jimmy Connors~~ (withdrew)
2. (United States) John McEnroe (champion)
3. (United States) Vitas Gerulaitis (first round)
4. (United States) Roscoe Tanner (semifinals)
5. (United States) Arthur Ashe (semifinals)
6. (United States) Brian Gottfried (third round)
7. (Argentina) José Luis Clerc (second round)
8. (Australia) John Alexander (second round)
9. (United States) Tim Gullikson (first round)
10. (United States) Peter Fleming (first round)
11. (United States) Sandy Mayer (quarterfinals)
12. (United States) Dick Stockton (quarterfinals)
13. (South Africa) Johan Kriek (first round)
14. (India) Vijay Amritraj (third round)
15. (Paraguay) Víctor Pecci (final)
16. (United States) Stan Smith (second round)

== Draw ==
=== Key ===
- Q = Qualifier
- WC = Wild card
- LL = Lucky loser
- Alt = Alternate
- SE = Special exempt
- PR = Protected ranking
- ITF = ITF entry
- JE = Junior exempt
- w/o = Walkover
- r = Retired
- d = Defaulted
- SR = Special ranking

=== Finals ===
Semifinals
15	(Paraguay) Víctor Pecci	6	7
5	(United States) Arthur Ashe	3	5
4	(United States) Roscoe Tanner	4	5
2	(United States) John McEnroe	6	7

Final
15	(Paraguay) Víctor Pecci	7	1	1
2	(United States) John McEnroe	6	6	6

=== Top half ===
==== Section 1 ====
First round
LL	(United Kingdom) R Taylor	4	6	6
Q	(United States) V Winitsky	6	2	2
(United States) T Wilkison	6	6
(United States) H Pfister	3	4
(South Africa) D Schneider	6	6
(United Kingdom) R Drysdale	3	4
(United Kingdom) J Lloyd	2	6	3
15	(Paraguay) V Pecci	6	3	6
10	(United States) P Fleming	6	3
(United States) B Teacher	7	6
(United Kingdom) J Feaver	1	6	2
(United States) B Manson	6	3	6
(United States) R Lutz	6	3	6
(Brazil) J Soares	3	6	3
(Paraguay) F González	3	6	4
8	(Australia) J Alexander	6	4	6

Second round
LL	(United Kingdom) R Taylor	4	6	4
(United States) T Wilkison	6	4	6
(South Africa) D Schneider	6	2
15	(Paraguay) V Pecci	7	6
(United States) B Teacher	6	7
(United States) B Manson	4	6
(United States) R Lutz	6	7
8	(Australia) J Alexander	2	6

Third round
(United States) T Wilkison	2	1
15	(Paraguay) V Pecci	6	6
(United States) B Teacher	3	5
(United States) R Lutz	6	7

Quarterfinals
15	(Paraguay) V Pecci	6	6
(United States) R Lutz	4	4

==== Section 2 ====
First round
3	(United States) V Gerulaitis	2	3
(United States) Tom Gullikson	6	6
(United Kingdom) R Lewis	6	6
Q	(United States) R Fisher	3	4
(United States) V Amaya	6	6
(United States) P Du Pré	4	3
(Zimbabwe Rhodesia) A Pattison	6	3	4
12	(United States) D Stockton	3	6	6
13	(South Africa) J Kriek	4	3
(Australia) G Masters	6	6
(United States) B Scanlon	6	4	4
(South Africa) B Mitton	4	6	6
(Australia) P Kronk	7	6
(United States) J Sadri	6	2
Q	(Australia) C Kachel	3	1
5	(United States) A Ashe	6	6

Second round
(United States) Tom Gullikson	6	4
(United Kingdom) R Lewis	7	6
(United States) V Amaya	7	6	6
12	(United States) D Stockton	6	7	8
(Australia) G Masters	1	6	4
(South Africa) B Mitton	6	3	6
(Australia) P Kronk	4	0
5	(United States) A Ashe	6	6

Third round
(United Kingdom) R Lewis	6	2
12	(United States) D Stockton	7	6
(South Africa) B Mitton	6	6	13
5	(United States) A Ashe	7	4	15

Quarterfinals
12	(United States) D Stockton	4	4
5	(United States) A Ashe	6	6

=== Bottom half ===
==== Section 3 ====
First round
7	(Argentina) J L Clerc	7	6
(United States) S Stewart	6	2
(United Kingdom) M Cox	3	3
(United States) F Taygan	6	6
(United States) T Gorman	3	3
(United States) N Saviano	6	6
Q	(United States) J Austin	6	2	6
9	(United States) Tim Gullikson	4	6	4
16	(United States) S Smith	6	6	9
(Australia) C Dibley	4	7	7
(Chile) J Fillol	4	6	4
(United States) M Riessen	6	4	6
(Australia) P Dent	6	6
(United States) M Cahill	1	4
Q	(Australia) D Collings	6	6
4	(United States) R Tanner	7	7

Second round
7	(Argentina) J L Clerc	2	3
(United States) F Taygan	6	6
(United States) N Saviano	7	7
Q	(United States) J Austin	6	6
16	(United States) S Smith	3	4
(United States) M Riessen	6	6
(Australia) P Dent	3	3
4	(United States) R Tanner	6	6

Third round
(United States) F Taygan	0	2
(United States) N Saviano	6	6
(United States) M Riessen	6	4
4	(United States) R Tanner	7	6

Quarterfinals
(United States) N Saviano	4	3
4	(United States) R Tanner	6	6

==== Section 4 ====
First round
6	(United States) B Gottfried	2	6	6
(Australia) M Edmondson	6	4	4
(Ecuador) R Ycaza	3	2
(Australia) R Case	6	6
(South Africa) R Moore	7	6	3
(United States) T Moor	6	7	6
Q	(United States) R Crawford	6	4
11	(United States) S Mayer	7	6
14	(India) V Amritraj	7	6
(Australia) A Gardiner	6	2
(Australia) B Drewett	6	6
(Australia) J Marks	4	4
Q	(United States) M Doyle	4	6
(Australia) J James	6	7
Q	(United States) C Pasarell	4	4
2	(United States) J McEnroe	6	6

Second round
6	(United States) B Gottfried	6	7
(Australia) R Case	4	5
(United States) T Moor	3	6
11	(United States) S Mayer	6	7
14	(India) V Amritraj	6	6
(Australia) B Drewett	3	3
(Australia) J James	6	3	2
2	(United States) J McEnroe	3	6	6

Third round
6	(United States) B Gottfried	6	7	3
11	(United States) S Mayer	7	6	6
14	(India) V Amritraj	6	1
2	(United States) J McEnroe	7	6

Quarterfinals
11	(United States) S Mayer	6	2	4
2	(United States) J McEnroe	3	6	6
