= 1977 Queen's Club Championships =

- Date: 13–18 June
- Edition: 75th
- Category: Grand Prix 3 Star
- Draw: 32S / 32D
- Prize money: $100,000
- Surface: Grass / outdoor
- Location: London, United Kingdom
- Venue: Queen's Club

Champions

Singles
- (Mexico) Raúl Ramírez

Doubles
- (India) Anand Amritraj / (India) Vijay Amritraj
- Queen's Club Championships

The 1977 Queen's Club Championships was a tennis tournament played on grass courts at the Queen's Club in London in the United Kingdom that was part of the 1977 Colgate-Palmolive Grand Prix. It was the 75th edition of the tournament and was held from 13 June through 18 June 1977. Raúl Ramírez won the singles title.

== Finals ==
=== Singles ===
(Mexico) Raúl Ramírez defeated (United Kingdom) Mark Cox 9–7, 7–5

- It was Ramírez's 1st singles title of the year and the 12th of his career.

=== Doubles ===
(India) Anand Amritraj / (India) Vijay Amritraj defeated (United Kingdom) John Lloyd / (United Kingdom) David Lloyd 6–1, 6–2

- It was Anand Amritraj's only title of the year and the 7th of his career. It was Vijay Amritraj's 3rd title of the year and the 16th of his career.
