= 1979 Stella Artois Championships =

1979 Queen's Club Championships
- Date: 11–17 June
- Edition: 77th
- Category: Grand Prix
- Draw: 64S / 32D
- Prize money: $125,000
- Surface: Grass / outdoor
- Location: London, United Kingdom
- Venue: Queen's Club

Champions

Singles
- (United States) John McEnroe

Doubles
- (United States) Tim Gullikson / (United States) Tom Gullikson
- Queen's Club Championships

The 1979 Stella Artois Championships, also known as the Queen's Club Championships, was a men's tennis tournament played on outdoor grass courts at the Queen's Club in London in the United Kingdom that was part of the 1979 Colgate-Palmolive Grand Prix circuit. It was the 77th edition of the tournament and was held from 11 June through 17 June 1979. Second-seeded John McEnroe won the singles title.

== Finals ==
=== Singles ===
(United States) John McEnroe defeated (Paraguay) Víctor Pecci 6–7, 6–1, 6–1

- It was McEnroe's 5th singles title of the year and the 10th of his career.

=== Doubles ===
(United States) Tim Gullikson / (United States) Tom Gullikson defeated (United States) Marty Riessen / (United States) Sherwood Stewart 6–4, 6–4

- It was Tim Gullikson's 1st title of the year and the 8th of his career. It was Tom Gullikson's 1st title of the year and the 5th of his career.
