= 1973 Queen's Club Championships – Men's singles =

Tennis tournament

Men's singles
- 1973 Queen's Club Championships

Final
- Champion: (Romania) Ilie Năstase
- Runner-up: (United Kingdom) Roger Taylor
- Score: 9–8, 6–3

Details
- Draw: 48

Events
Singles	men	women
Doubles	men	women
← 1972 ·	Queen's Club Championships	· 1977 →

Jimmy Connors was the defending champion, but lost in the third round this year.

Ilie Năstase won the men's singles title at the 1973 Queen's Club Championships tennis tournament, defeating Roger Taylor 9–8, 6–3 in the final.

== Seeds ==
1. (Romania) Ilie Năstase (champion)

== Draw ==
=== Key ===
- Q = Qualifier
- WC = Wild card
- LL = Lucky loser
- Alt = Alternate
- SE = Special exempt
- PR = Protected ranking
- ITF = ITF entry
- JE = Junior exempt
- w/o = Walkover
- r = Retired
- d = Defaulted
- SR = Special ranking

=== Finals ===
Semifinals
1	(Romania) Ilie Năstase	6	9	7
(Soviet Union) Alex Metreveli	8	7	5
(Australia) Owen Davidson	5	3
(United Kingdom) Roger Taylor	7	6

Final
1	(Romania) Ilie Năstase	9	6
(United Kingdom) Roger Taylor	8	3

=== Top half ===
==== Section 1 ====
First round

Second round
1	(Romania) I Năstase	5	6	6
(United States) D Stockton	7	1	4
(Australia) B Carmichael	6	4	3
(South Africa) R Moore	3	6	6
(Italy) P Bertolucci	6	8	6
(Australia) T Roche	3	9	4
(United States) C Richey	6	5	3
(Egypt) I El Shafei	3	7	6

Third round
1	(Romania) I Năstase	6	6
(South Africa) R Moore	0	2
(Italy) P Bertolucci	4	4
(Egypt) I El Shafei	6	6

Quarterfinals
1	(Romania) I Năstase	6	6
(Egypt) I El Shafei	0	3

==== Section 2 ====
First round
(Netherlands) T Okker	7	6
(United Kingdom) G Battrick	5	3
(Australia) G Masters	5	6	3
(Soviet Union) A Metreveli	7	1	6
(United States) R Lutz	8	2
(New Zealand) B Fairlie	9	6
(United States) B Gottfried	w/o
(West Germany) HJ Pohmann
(United States) J Connors	6	6
(Australia) B Phillips-Moore	3	2
(United States) Greg Cooper	w/o
(Australia) R Emerson
(United States) T Gorman	4	2
(West Germany) J Fassbender	6	6
(United States) R Tanner	6	4	6
(France) P Barthès	4	6	2

Second round
(Netherlands) T Okker	5	8	4
(Soviet Union) A Metreveli	7	6	6
(New Zealand) B Fairlie	7	6
(United States) B Gottfried	5	4
(United States) J Connors	6	6
(United States) Greg Cooper	4	4
(West Germany) J Fassbender	9	9
(United States) R Tanner	8	8

Third round
(Soviet Union) A Metreveli	6	7
(New Zealand) B Fairlie	2	5
(United States) J Connors	6	7	3
(West Germany) J Fassbender	2	9	6

Quarterfinals
(Soviet Union) A Metreveli	6	6
(West Germany) J Fassbender	4	2

=== Bottom half ===
==== Section 3 ====
First round
(Australia) O Davidson	6	9
(United States) F Froehling	3	8
(Australia) C Dibley	8	8	6
(India) V Amritraj	9	6	3
(United States) E van Dillen
(United States) E Dibbs	w/o
(United States) M Estep	7	6
(United States) M Riessen	5	2
(France) F Jauffret	8	6	4
(United States) C Pasarell	9	3	6
(India) A Amritraj	9	3	5
(West Germany) K Meiler	8	6	7
(Australia) P Dent	w/o
(South Africa) B Hewitt
(Australia) R Keldie	4	4
(Australia) J Newcombe	6	6

Second round
(Australia) O Davidson	6	6
(Australia) C Dibley	3	2
(United States) E Dibbs	6	7	6
(United States) M Estep	3	9	3
(United States) C Pasarell	4	8
(West Germany) K Meiler	6	9
(Australia) P Dent	6	4
(Australia) J Newcombe	8	6

Third round
(Australia) O Davidson	7	6	6
(United States) E Dibbs	9	4	1
(West Germany) K Meiler	8	4
(Australia) J Newcombe	9	6

Quarterfinals
(Australia) O Davidson	7	6
(Australia) J Newcombe	5	3

==== Section 4 ====
First round

Second round
(United Kingdom) R Taylor	6	9
(Australia) J Alexander	4	7
(Australia) R Case	5	2
(United States) A Ashe	7	6
(South Africa) C Drysdale	6	7
(United States) C Graebner	4	5
(United States) H Solomon	6	6
(Italy) A Panatta	4	1

Third round
(United Kingdom) R Taylor	4	6	6
(United States) A Ashe	6	3	3
(South Africa) C Drysdale	6	6
(United States) H Solomon	3	4

Quarterfinals
(United Kingdom) R Taylor	6	6
(South Africa) C Drysdale	3	3
