= 1980 Stella Artois Championships =

- Date: 9–15 June
- Edition: 78th
- Category: Grand Prix
- Draw: 64S / 32D
- Prize money: $125,000
- Surface: Grass / outdoor
- Location: London, United Kingdom
- Venue: Queen's Club

Champions

Singles
- (United States) John McEnroe

Doubles
- (Australia) Rod Frawley / (Australia) Geoff Masters
- Queen's Club Championships

The 1980 Stella Artois Championships, also known as the Queen's Club Championships, was a men's tennis tournament played on outdoor grass courts at the Queen's Club in London in the United Kingdom that was part of the 1980 Volvo Grand Prix circuit. It was the 78th edition of the tournament and was held from 9 June through 15 June 1980. First-seeded John McEnroe won his second consecutive singles title at the event.

== Finals ==
=== Singles ===
(United States) John McEnroe defeated (Australia) Kim Warwick 6–3, 6–1

- It was McEnroe's 4th singles title of the year and the 19th of his career.

=== Doubles ===
(Australia) Rod Frawley / (Australia) Geoff Masters defeated (Australia) Paul McNamee / (United States) Sherwood Stewart 6–2, 4–6, 11–9

- It was Frawley's 2nd title of the year and the 3rd of his career. It was Masters' 2nd title of the year and the 23rd of his career.
