= 1973 Queen's Club Championships – Men's doubles =

Men's doubles
- 1973 Queen's Club Championships

Final
- Champions: (Netherlands) Tom Okker (United States) Marty Riessen
- Runners-up: (Australia) Ray Keldie (South Africa) Raymond Moore
- Score: 6–4, 7–5

Details
- Draw: 32

Events
Singles	men	women
Doubles	men	women
← 1972 ·	Queen's Club Championships	· 1977 →

Jim McManus and Jim Osborne were the defending champions, but did not participate this year.

Tom Okker and Marty Riessen won the men's doubles title at the 1973 Queen's Club Championships tennis tournament, defeating Ray Keldie and Raymond Moore 6–4, 7–5 in the final.

== Draw ==
=== Key ===
- Q = Qualifier
- WC = Wild card
- LL = Lucky loser
- Alt = Alternate
- SE = Special exempt
- PR = Protected ranking
- ITF = ITF entry
- JE = Junior exempt
- w/o = Walkover
- r = Retired
- d = Defaulted
- SR = Special ranking

=== Finals ===
Semifinals
(France) Pierre Barthès (France) François Jauffret	1	1
(Australia) Ray Keldie (South Africa) Raymond Moore	6	6
(Soviet Union) Sergei Likhachev (Soviet Union) Alex Metreveli	8	4
(Netherlands) Tom Okker (United States) Marty Riessen	9	6

Final
(Australia) Ray Keldie (South Africa) Raymond Moore	4	5
(Netherlands) Tom Okker (United States) Marty Riessen	6	7

=== Top half ===
First round
(United States) J Connors (Romania) I Năstase	6	6
(South Africa) P Cramer (Australia) Jim Moore	2	4
(United States) F Froehling (United States) C Pasarell	8	4
(India) A Amritraj (India) V Amritraj	9	6
(United States) B Gottfried (United States) D Stockton	6	9
(United States) A Ashe (United States) R Tanner	3	8
(Italy) C Barazzutti (Italy) A Zugarelli	3	4
(France) P Barthès (France) F Jauffret	6	6
(Italy) P Bertolucci (Italy) A Panatta	4	4
(United States) Z Guerry (United States) R McKinley	6	6
(United Kingdom) G Battrick (Australia) B Phillips-Moore	9	6
(Soviet Union) T Kakoulia (Austria) H Kary	8	3
(Australia) R Keldie (South Africa) R Moore	6	6
(Australia) J Cooper (Australia) N Fraser	3	4
(Egypt) I El Shafei (New Zealand) B Fairlie
(Australia) J Newcombe (Australia) T Roche

Second round
(United States) J Connors (Romania) I Năstase	7	6	1
(India) A Amritraj (India) V Amritraj	5	8	6
(United States) B Gottfried (United States) D Stockton	3	1
(France) P Barthès (France) F Jauffret	6	6
(United States) Z Guerry (United States) R McKinley	2	6	6
(United Kingdom) G Battrick (Australia) B Phillips-Moore	6	4	4
(Australia) R Keldie (South Africa) R Moore	6	6
(Egypt) I El Shafei (New Zealand) B Fairlie	4	3

Quarterfinals
(India) A Amritraj (India) V Amritraj	6	3	11
(France) P Barthès (France) F Jauffret	4	6	13
(United States) Z Guerry (United States) R McKinley	7	3	4
(Australia) R Keldie (South Africa) R Moore	5	6	6

Semifinals
(France) P Barthès (France) F Jauffret	1	1
(Australia) R Keldie (South Africa) R Moore	6	6

=== Bottom half ===
First round
(Australia) T Addison (Australia) C Dibley	8	7
(West Germany) J Fassbender (West Germany) K Meiler	9	9
(United States) C Graebner (United States) D Ralston	6	9
(Australia) R Case (Australia) G Masters	1	8
(Soviet Union) S Likhachev (Soviet Union) A Metreveli	6	6
(United States) T Gorman (United States) E van Dillen	2	3
(United States) R Lutz (United States) S Smith	6	9
(Mexico) J Loyo-Mayo (Chile) J Pinto Bravo	4	8
(United States) M Estep (Chile) J Fillol
(South Africa) B Hewitt (South Africa) F McMillan
(United States) E Dibbs (United States) H Solomon	4	9	4
(Australia) J Alexander (Australia) P Dent	6	8	6
(Australia) B Howe (South Africa) A Segal	2	3
(Australia) B Carmichael (Australia) O Davidson	6	6
(Japan) J Kamiwazumi (United States) B Seewagen	3	6
(Netherlands) T Okker (United States) M Riessen	6	8

Second round
(West Germany) J Fassbender (West Germany) K Meiler	7	6	3
(United States) C Graebner (United States) D Ralston	9	4	6
(Soviet Union) S Likhachev (Soviet Union) A Metreveli	8	9
(United States) R Lutz (United States) S Smith	6	7
(United States) M Estep (Chile) J Fillol	5	9	6
(Australia) J Alexander (Australia) P Dent	7	8	8
(Australia) B Carmichael (Australia) O Davidson	6	5	3
(Netherlands) T Okker (United States) M Riessen	3	7	6

Quarterfinals
(United States) C Graebner (United States) D Ralston	5	6	3
(Soviet Union) S Likhachev (Soviet Union) A Metreveli	7	4	6
(Australia) J Alexander (Australia) P Dent	7	6	2
(Netherlands) T Okker (United States) M Riessen	9	4	6

Semifinals
(Soviet Union) S Likhachev (Soviet Union) A Metreveli	8	4
(Netherlands) T Okker (United States) M Riessen	9	6
