= 1978 Queen's Club Championships – Singles =

Singles
- 1978 Queen's Club Championships

Final
- Champion: (Australia) Tony Roche
- Runner-up: (United States) John McEnroe
- Score: 8–6, 9–7

Details
- Draw: 64
- Seeds: 16

Events
Singles	Doubles
← 1977 ·	Queen's Club Championships	· 1979 →

Raúl Ramírez was the defending champion but lost in the first round to Victor Amaya.

Tony Roche won the singles title at the 1978 Queen's Club Championships tennis tournament defeating John McEnroe in the final 8–6, 9–7.

== Seeds ==
1. (Mexico) Raúl Ramírez (first round)
2. (United States) Sandy Mayer (semifinals)
3. (Romania) Ilie Năstase (first round)
4. (United States) John McEnroe (final)
5. (United States) Tim Gullikson (first round)
6. (Australia) John Alexander (quarterfinals)
7. (Australia) John Newcombe (third round)
8. (Italy) Adriano Panatta (first round)
9. (Chile) Jaime Fillol (third round)
10. (Australia) Phil Dent (second round)
11. (United Kingdom) John Lloyd (quarterfinals)
12. n/a
13. (United States) Hank Pfister (second round)
14. (United Kingdom) Mark Cox (first round)
15. (United States) Tom Leonard (first round)
16. (United States) Jeff Borowiak (first round)

== Draw ==
=== Key ===
- Q = Qualifier
- WC = Wild card
- LL = Lucky loser
- Alt = Alternate
- SE = Special exempt
- PR = Protected ranking
- ITF = ITF entry
- JE = Junior exempt
- w/o = Walkover
- r = Retired
- d = Defaulted
- SR = Special ranking

=== Finals ===
Semifinals
(Australia) Colin Dibley	3	9	2
4	(United States) John McEnroe	6	8	6
(Australia) Tony Roche	2	6	8
2	(United States) Sandy Mayer	6	3	6

Final
4	(United States) John McEnroe	6	7
(Australia) Tony Roche	8	9

=== Top half ===
==== Section 1 ====
First round
1	(Mexico) R Ramírez	6	7	10
(United States) V Amaya	2	9	12
(Italy) A Zugarelli	8	4
(Netherlands) T Okker	9	6
(New Zealand) B Fairlie	6	6	6
(India) V Amritraj	3	8	4
(Australia) C Dibley	6	6
14	(United Kingdom) M Cox	2	1
16	(United States) J Borowiak	5	4
(United States) T Moor	7	6
(United Kingdom) J Feaver	3	6
(United Kingdom) R Lewis	6	8
Q	(United States) S Carnahan	2	4
Q	(Australia) R Frawley	6	6
(United Kingdom) R Taylor	6	6	5
6	(Australia) J Alexander	2	8	7

Second round
(United States) V Amaya	8	7
(Netherlands) T Okker	6	5
(New Zealand) B Fairlie	0	5
(Australia) C Dibley	6	7
(United States) T Moor	9	6
(United Kingdom) R Lewis	7	2
Q	(Australia) R Frawley	7	4
6	(Australia) J Alexander	9	6

Third round
(United States) V Amaya	1	5
(Australia) C Dibley	6	7
(United States) T Moor	6	1	4
6	(Australia) J Alexander	4	6	6

Quarterfinals
(Australia) C Dibley	6	6
6	(Australia) J Alexander	4	4

==== Section 2 ====
First round
4	(United States) J McEnroe	4	7	6
Q	(United States) P Fleming	6	5	3
(Egypt) I El Shafei	6	3	7
(Australia) K Warwick	4	6	5
(United States) M Riessen	4	3
(United States) B Teacher	6	6
(United States) G Mayer	6	6
LL	(Netherlands) L Sanders	2	2
9	(Chile) J Fillol	9	6
(Australia) C Letcher	7	4
(South Africa) R Moore	4	6	7
(Australia) T Rocavert	6	4	5
(United States) Tom Gullikson	6	6
(United States) J C Hagey	3	3
(New Zealand) C Lewis	6	6
8	(Italy) A Panatta	3	3

Second round
4	(United States) J McEnroe	6	6
(Egypt) I El Shafei	3	4
(United States) B Teacher	4	3
(United States) G Mayer	6	6
9	(Chile) J Fillol	6	6
(South Africa) R Moore	4	3
(United States) Tom Gullikson	6	6
(New Zealand) C Lewis	3	2

Third round
4	(United States) J McEnroe	7	6
(United States) G Mayer	5	0
9	(Chile) J Fillol	6	4	1
(United States) Tom Gullikson	3	6	6

Quarterfinals
4	(United States) J McEnroe	4	6	6
(United States) Tom Gullikson	6	2	4

=== Bottom half ===
==== Section 3 ====
First round
5	(United States) Tim Gullikson	1	8
(United States) B Martin	6	9
(United States) P Du Pré	6	0^{r}
(Paraguay) V Pecci	8	1
(Australia) T Roche	7	8
(South Africa) B Mitton	5	6
(Australia) B Giltinan	0	2
13	(United States) H Pfister	6	6
10	(Australia) P Dent	6	1	6
(Sweden) O N Bengtson	1	6	4
(Australia) R Ruffels	6	5	3
(United States) N Saviano	3	7	6
(Switzerland) H Günthardt	6	6
(United Kingdom) R Drysdale	4	2
(Australia) J James	8	9
3	(Romania) I Năstase	6	8

Second round
(United States) B Martin	6	5	6
(Paraguay) V Pecci	3	7	2
(Australia) T Roche	9	9
13	(United States) H Pfister	7	7
10	(Australia) P Dent	4	4
(United States) N Saviano	6	6
(Switzerland) H Günthardt	4	3
(Australia) J James	6	6

Third round
(United States) B Martin	5	1
(Australia) T Roche	7	6
(United States) N Saviano	6	6
(Australia) J James	2	4

Quarterfinals
(Australia) T Roche	6	6
(United States) N Saviano	3	4

==== Section 4 ====
First round
7	(Australia) J Newcombe	9	9
(United States) S Stewart	8	8
(Australia) D Crealy	6	3	11
(Australia) S Docherty	4	6	9
(Australia) A Stone	6	3	8
Q	(India) S Menon	3	6	6
Q	(Australia) P McNamara	2	6	3
11	(United Kingdom) J Lloyd	6	3	6
15	(United States) T Leonard	6	6	2
Q	(France) C Roger-Vasselin	8	1	6
(Australia) R Case	7	6
(United Kingdom) D Lloyd	5	3
(Chile) B Prajoux	7	1
(Austria) P Feigl	9	6
(United States) V Winitsky	2	2
2	(United States) S Mayer	6	6

Second round
7	(Australia) J Newcombe	6	6
(Australia) D Crealy	2	2
(Australia) A Stone	4	4
11	(United Kingdom) J Lloyd	6	6
Q	(France) C Roger-Vasselin	3	6	4
(Australia) R Case	6	3	6
(Austria) P Feigl	5	8	4
2	(United States) S Mayer	7	6	6

Third round
7	(Australia) J Newcombe	4	4
11	(United Kingdom) J Lloyd	6	6
(Australia) R Case	5	6	2
2	(United States) S Mayer	7	3	6

Quarterfinals
11	(United Kingdom) J Lloyd	5	3
2	(United States) S Mayer	7	6
