= 1969 Queen's Club Championships =

- Date: 16–21 June
- Edition: 70th
- Draw: 64S / 32D / 32X
- Surface: Grass / outdoor
- Location: London, United Kingdom
- Venue: Queen's Club

Champions

Men's singles
- (Australia) Fred Stolle

Women's singles
- (United Kingdom) Ann Jones

Men's doubles
- (Australia) Owen Davidson / (United States) Dennis Ralston

Women's doubles
- (United States) Rosie Casals / (United States) Billie-Jean King
← 1968 ·	Queen's Club Championships	· 1970 →

The 1969 Queen's Club Championships, also known by its official name London Grass Court Championships, was a combined men's and women's tennis tournament played on grass courts at the Queen's Club in London in the United Kingdom. It was the 70th edition of the tournament and was held from 16 June through 21 June 1969. Fred Stolle and Ann Jones won the singles titles.

== Finals ==
=== Men's singles ===
(Australia) Fred Stolle defeated (Australia) John Newcombe 6–3, 22–20

- It was Stolle's 1st title of the year and the 4th of his professional career.

=== Women's singles ===
(United Kingdom) Ann Jones defeated (United Kingdom) Winnie Shaw 6–0, 6–1

=== Men's doubles ===
(Australia) Owen Davidson / (United States) Dennis Ralston defeated (Sweden) Ove Nils Bengtson / (Brazil) Thomaz Koch 7–5, 6–3

- It was Davidson's 2nd title of the year and the 2nd of his career. It was Ralston's only title of the year and the 2nd of his career.

=== Women's doubles ===
(United States) Rosie Casals / (United States) Billie-Jean King defeated (France) Françoise Dürr / (United Kingdom) Ann Jones 8–6, 6–4
