= 1978 Queen's Club Championships =

- Date: 19–24 June
- Edition: 76th
- Category: Grand Prix
- Draw: 64S / 32D
- Prize money: $125,000
- Surface: Grass / outdoor
- Location: London, United Kingdom
- Venue: Queen's Club

Champions

Singles
- (Australia) Tony Roche

Doubles
- (South Africa) Bob Hewitt / (South Africa) Frew McMillan
- Queen's Club Championships

The 1978 Queen's Club Championships, also known by its sponsored name Rawlings International, was a men's tennis tournament played on outdoor grass courts at the Queen's Club in London in the United Kingdom that was part of the 1978 Colgate-Palmolive Grand Prix circuit. It was the 76th edition of the tournament and was held from 19 June through 24 June 1978. Unseeded Tony Roche won the singles title.

== Finals ==
=== Singles ===
(Australia) Tony Roche defeated (United States) John McEnroe 8–6, 9–7

- It was Roche's 2nd title of the year and the 26th of his career.

=== Doubles ===
(South Africa) Bob Hewitt / (South Africa) Frew McMillan defeated (United States) Fred McNair / (Mexico) Raúl Ramírez 6–2, 7–5

- It was Hewitt's 5th title of the year and the 50th of his career. It was McMillan's 5th title of the year and the 54th of his career.
