= 1977 Queen's Club Championships – Singles =

Singles
- 1977 Queen's Club Championships

Final
- Champion: (Mexico) Raúl Ramírez
- Runner-up: (United Kingdom) Mark Cox
- Score: 9–7, 7–5

Details
- Draw: 64
- Seeds: 16

Events
Singles	Doubles
← 1973 ·	Queen's Club Championships	· 1978 →

Raúl Ramírez won the singles title at the 1977 Queen's Club Championships tennis tournament defeating Mark Cox in the final 9–7, 7–5.

== Seeds ==
1. (United States) Jimmy Connors (second round)
2. (Argentina) Guillermo Vilas (second round)
3. (Romania) Ilie Năstase (third round)
4. (United States) Brian Gottfried (semifinals)

== Draw ==
=== Key ===
- Q = Qualifier
- WC = Wild card
- LL = Lucky loser
- Alt = Alternate
- SE = Special exempt
- PR = Protected ranking
- ITF = ITF entry
- JE = Junior exempt
- w/o = Walkover
- r = Retired
- d = Defaulted
- SR = Special ranking

=== Finals ===
Semifinals
(Mexico) Raúl Ramírez	9	6
4	(United States) Brian Gottfried	8	2
(United States) Hank Pfister	8	6	4
(United Kingdom) Mark Cox	9	1	6

Final
(Mexico) Raúl Ramírez	9	7
(United Kingdom) Mark Cox	7	5

=== Top half ===
==== Section 1 ====
First round
1	(United States) J Connors	6	6
(Sweden) K Johansson	1	4
(United Kingdom) J Feaver	6	9
(United States) F McNair	2	8
(Chile) J Fillol	4	8
(South Africa) R Moore	6	9
(United States) J Delaney	6	9
(India) S Menon	2	7
(Mexico) R Ramírez	8	9	6
(United Kingdom) R Drysdale	9	8	4
(Rhodesia) A Pattison	6	3	4
(United States) T Gullikson	4	6	6
(United States) D Stockton	6	6
(Australia) D Crealy	3	4
Q	(United States) P Du Pré	5	4
(United States) B Martin	7	6

Second round
1	(United States) J Connors
(United Kingdom) J Feaver	w/o
(South Africa) R Moore	6	1	2
(United States) J Delaney	3	6	6
(Mexico) R Ramírez	6	8	6
(United States) T Gullikson	4	9	2
(United States) D Stockton	6	8	6
(United States) B Martin	3	9	4

Third round
(United Kingdom) J Feaver	6	2	1
(United States) J Delaney	3	6	6
(Mexico) R Ramírez	3	6	9
(United States) D Stockton	6	3	7

Quarterfinals
(United States) J Delaney	6	1	2
(Mexico) R Ramírez	3	6	6

==== Section 2 ====
First round
4	(United States) B Gottfried	6	6
Q	(India) A Amritraj	4	2
(Australia) R Laver	3	4
(Venezuela) J Andrew	6	6
(United States) R Lutz	6	6
(United States) T Gorman	1	4
Q	(Czechoslovakia) T Šmíd	9	6
(South Africa) B Hewitt	7	4
(Italy) A Panatta	6	6
(South Africa) B Mitton	4	2
(United States) S Stewart	6	7	8
(Australia) J Newcombe	4	9	6
(United States) C Richey	8	2
(Australia) K Warwick	9	6
(South Africa) W Prinsloo	4	3
(United Kingdom) D Lloyd	6	6

Second round
4	(United States) B Gottfried	8	6
(Venezuela) J Andrew	6	4
(United States) R Lutz	6	6
Q	(Czechoslovakia) T Šmíd	4	3
(Italy) A Panatta	3	6	7
(United States) S Stewart	6	3	5
(Australia) K Warwick	0	6	13
(United Kingdom) D Lloyd	6	3	11

Third round
4	(United States) B Gottfried	7	6
(United States) R Lutz	5	1
(Italy) A Panatta	4	9	2
(Australia) K Warwick	6	8	0/r

Quarterfinals
4	(United States) B Gottfried	6	6
(Italy) A Panatta	3	4

=== Bottom half ===
==== Section 3 ====
First round
(Australia) G Masters	8	5	7
(Australia) M Edmondson	6	7	5
(South Africa) B Bertram	6	9	6
(United States) B Scanlon	8	8	3
(New Zealand) O Parun	9	1	2
(Australia) P Dent	8	6	6
Q	(United Kingdom) M Wayman	3	4
(United States) R Tanner	6	6
(United States) H Pfister	2	8	11
(United States) M Riessen	6	6	9
(United States) G Mayer	1	2
(United States) S Smith	6	6
Q	(United States) N Saviano	9	4	4
(United States) V Amaya	8	6	6
(South Africa) F McMillan	6	2	2
3	(Romania) I Năstase	3	6	6

Second round
(Australia) G Masters	4	6	2
(South Africa) B Bertram	6	3	6
(Australia) P Dent	2	3
(United States) R Tanner	6	6
(United States) H Pfister	6	6
(United States) S Smith	3	4
(United States) V Amaya	3	6
3	(Romania) I Năstase	6	8

Third round
(South Africa) B Bertram	5	2
(United States) R Tanner	7	6
(United States) H Pfister	6	6
3	(Romania) I Năstase	2	3

Quarterfinals
(United States) R Tanner	8	8
(United States) H Pfister	9	9

==== Section 4 ====
First round
(Australia) R Ruffels	3	6	4
(New Zealand) B Fairlie	6	4	6
(United States) P Fleming	6	5	4
(Australia) J Alexander	4	7	6
Q	(Sweden) D Palm	4	4
(United States) B Teacher	6	6
(Australia) C Dibley	9	6
(United States) H Solomon	7	3
(United Kingdom) R Taylor	6	6
Q	(Brazil) J Soares	4	4
(United States) J Borowiak	8	8
(United Kingdom) M Cox	9	9
Q	(Czechoslovakia) J Šimbera	4	2
(Australia) R Case	6	6
(South Africa) D Joubert	4	3
2	(Argentina) G Vilas	6	6

Second round
(New Zealand) B Fairlie	9	3	6
(Australia) J Alexander	8	6	4
(United States) B Teacher	3	2
(Australia) C Dibley	6	6
(United Kingdom) R Taylor	8	8	3
(United Kingdom) M Cox	6	9	6
(Australia) R Case	4	8	6
2	(Argentina) G Vilas	6	6	4

Third round
(New Zealand) B Fairlie	8	9	1
(Australia) C Dibley	9	7	6
(United Kingdom) M Cox	5	6	6
(Australia) R Case	7	3	1

Quarterfinals
(Australia) C Dibley	9	3	8
(United Kingdom) M Cox	8	6	10
