= 1973 Queen's Club Championships =

Tennis tournament

- Date: 17–23 June
- Edition: 74th
- Category: Grand Prix (men); Grand Prix (women)
- Draw: 64S / 32D (men)
- Surface: Grass / outdoor
- Location: London, United Kingdom
- Venue: Queen's Club

Champions

Men's singles
- (Romania) Ilie Năstase

Women's singles
- (Soviet Union) Olga Morozova

Men's doubles
- (Netherlands) Tom Okker / (United States) Marty Riessen

Women's doubles
- (United States) Rosie Casals / (United States) Billie Jean King
- Queen's Club Championships

The 1973 Queen's Club Championships was a tennis tournament played on grass courts at the Queen's Club in London in the United Kingdom. The men's tournament was part of the 1973 Commercial Union Assurance Grand Prix circuit while the women's event was part of the 1973 Women's Grand Prix tour. It was the 74th edition of the tournament and was held from 17 June until 23 June 1973. Ilie Năstase and Olga Morozova won the singles titles.

== Finals ==
=== Men's singles ===
(Romania) Ilie Năstase defeated (United Kingdom) Roger Taylor 9–8, 6–3

- It was Năstase's 10th singles title of the year and the 34th of his career.

=== Women's singles ===
(Soviet Union) Olga Morozova defeated (Australia) Evonne Goolagong 6–2, 6–3

- It was Morozova's 2nd title of the year and the 7th of her career.

=== Men's doubles ===
(Netherlands) Tom Okker / (United States) Marty Riessen defeated (Australia) Ray Keldie / (South Africa) Raymond Moore 6–4, 7–5

- It was Okker's 10th title of the year and the 43rd of his career. It was Riessen's 5th title of the year and the 35th of his career.

=== Women's doubles ===
(United States) Rosie Casals / (United States) Billie Jean King defeated (France) Françoise Dürr / (Netherlands) Betty Stöve 4–6, 6–3, 7–5

- It was Casals' 2nd title of the year and the 20th of her career. It was King's 1st title of the year and the 47th of her career.
