= 1968 Queen's Club Championships =

- Date: 17–22 June
- Edition: 69th
- Draw: 128S / 32D
- Prize money: $2,600
- Surface: Grass / outdoor
- Location: London, United Kingdom
- Venue: Queen's Club

Champions

Men's singles
- final not played

Women's singles
- final not played
- Queen's Club Championships

The 1968 Queen's Club Championships was a men's tennis tournament played on outdoor grass courts. It was the 69th edition of the Queen's Club Championships, the first to be held in the Open Era, and was played at the Queen's Club in London in the United Kingdom from 17 June until 22 June 1968.

== Finals ==
=== Men's singles ===
(United States) Clark Graebner vs. (Netherlands) Tom Okker

- The singles final was cancelled due to rain.

=== Women's singles ===
(United Kingdom) Ann Haydon-Jones vs. (United States) Nancy Richey

- The singles final was cancelled due to rain.
