= 1969 Queen's Club Championships – Men's singles =

Men's singles
- 1969 Queen's Club Championships

Final
- Champion: (Australia) Fred Stolle
- Runner-up: (Australia) John Newcombe
- Score: 6–3, 22–20

Details
- Draw: 80

Events
Singles	men	women
Doubles	men	women
- Queen's Club Championships

There was no defending champion, as the 1968 final was cancelled due to rain.

Fred Stolle won the singles title at the 1969 Queen's Club Championships tennis tournament, defeating John Newcombe 6–3, 22–20 in the final.

== Seeds ==
1. (Australia) Rod Laver (semifinals)
2. (Australia) Ken Rosewall (fourth round)

== Draw ==
Key

- Q = Qualifier
- WC = Wild card
- LL = Lucky loser
- Alt = Alternate
- ITF = ITF entry
- PR = Protected ranking
- SR = Special ranking
- SE = Special exempt
- JE = Junior exempt
- JR = Junior Accelerator Programme entrant
- CO = College Accelerator Programme entrant
- NG = Next Gen Accelerator Program entrant
- w/o = Walkover
- r = Retired
- d = Defaulted

=== Finals ===
Quarterfinals
1	(Australia) Rod Laver	3	7	6
(United States) Charlie Pasarell	6	5	1
(Spain) Andrés Gimeno	6	3
(Australia) John Newcombe	8	6
(Netherlands) Tom Okker	8	6	4
(Australia) Fred Stolle	6	8	6
(United States) Dennis Ralston	6	9
(United States) Ron Holmberg	4	7

Semifinals
1	(Australia) Rod Laver	4	4
(Australia) John Newcombe	6	6
(Australia) Fred Stolle	6	3	8
(United States) Dennis Ralston	2	6	6

Final
(Australia) John Newcombe	3	20
(Australia) Fred Stolle	6	22

=== Top half ===
==== Section 1 ====
First round

Second round
1	(Australia) R Laver	6	6
(United Kingdom) P Curtis	4	2
(Australia) T Addison	w/o
(Italy) N Pietrangeli
(Chile) L Ayala	6	12	6
(Australia) J Cooper	4	14	8
(Poland) W Gąsiorek	3	9	0
(Socialist Federal Republic of Yugoslavia) N Pilić	6	7	6

Third round
1	(Australia) R Laver	8	6
(Australia) T Addison	6	2
(Australia) J Cooper	3	3
(Socialist Federal Republic of Yugoslavia) N Pilić	6	6

Fourth round
1	(Australia) R Laver	6	4	6
(Socialist Federal Republic of Yugoslavia) N Pilić	3	6	2

==== Section 2 ====
First round

Second round
(United States) V Seixas	w/o
(Australia) R Keldie
(United Kingdom) S Warboys	5	3
(United States) C Pasarell	7	6
(United Kingdom) D Lloyd	4	4
(United Arab Republic) I El Shafei	6	6
(France) J-C Barclay
(South Africa) R Moore	w/o

Third round
(United States) V Seixas	3	6	1
(United States) C Pasarell	6	3	6
(United Arab Republic) I El Shafei	3	6	1
(South Africa) R Moore	6	4	6

Fourth round
(United States) C Pasarell	6	8	6
(South Africa) R Moore	3	10	1

==== Section 3 ====
First round

Second round
(United Kingdom) R Wilson	1	7
(Australia) R Emerson	6	9
(West Germany) H-J Plötz	8	6
(United Kingdom) P Hutchins	6	0
(United States) T Edlefsen	5	2
(New Zealand) B Fairlie	7	6
(Australia) P Dent	4	1
(Spain) A Gimeno	6	6

Third round
(Australia) R Emerson	6	6
(West Germany) H-J Plötz	3	4
(New Zealand) B Fairlie	6	4	5
(Spain) A Gimeno	4	6	7

Fourth round
(Australia) R Emerson	3	4
(Spain) A Gimeno	6	6

==== Section 4 ====
First round
(United Kingdom) R Taylor	6	1	6
(Chile) J Fillol	3	6	3
(South Africa) T Ryan	w/o
(Romania) I Năstase
(Sweden) ON Bengtson	6	5
(United States) S Smith	8	7
(France) P Beust	w/o
(South Africa) G Forbes
(France) JL Rouyer	8	4
(South Africa) R Maud	10	6
(France) J-P Courcol	6	4	3
(United States) EB Buchholz	3	6	6
(Australia) B Giltinan	2	4
(Australia) K Fletcher	6	6
(Brazil) T Koch	6	4	4
(Australia) J Newcombe	2	6	6

Second round
(United Kingdom) R Taylor	7	13
(South Africa) T Ryan	5	11
(United States) S Smith	6	6
(France) P Beust	3	2
(South Africa) R Maud	2	8	5
(United States) EB Buchholz	6	6	7
(Australia) K Fletcher	1	2
(Australia) J Newcombe	6	6

Third round
(United Kingdom) R Taylor	3	6	17
(United States) S Smith	6	2	15
(United States) EB Buchholz	10	0	8
(Australia) J Newcombe	8	6	10

Fourth round
(United Kingdom) R Taylor	6	3	4
(Australia) J Newcombe	3	6	6

=== Bottom half ===
==== Section 5 ====
First round
(Netherlands) T Okker	6	6
(Belgium) P Hombergen	1	2
(United States) J McManus	3	2
(Australia) O Davidson	6	6
(France) P Barthès	6	6
(Chile) P Cornejo	3	4
(Brazil) JE Mandarino
(United States) C Richey	w/o
(South Africa) B Hewitt	6	6
(India) P Lall	4	1
(Australia) R Ruffels	w/o
(Socialist Federal Republic of Yugoslavia) N Špear
(Australia) J Alexander	7	2	16
(France) G Goven	5	6	14
(Greece) N Kalogeropoulos
(United States) C Graebner	w/o

Second round
(Netherlands) T Okker	9	6
(Australia) O Davidson	7	2
(France) P Barthès	6	8	7
(United States) C Richey	4	10	5
(South Africa) B Hewitt	6	6
(Australia) R Ruffels	1	4
(Australia) J Alexander	5	6
(United States) C Graebner	7	8

Third round
(Netherlands) T Okker	6	6
(France) P Barthès	2	2
(South Africa) B Hewitt	2	6	6
(United States) C Graebner	6	3	3

Fourth round
(Netherlands) T Okker	2	6	7
(South Africa) B Hewitt	6	4	5

==== Section 6 ====
First round

Second round
(United States) Robert Perry	6	1	3
(Australia) F Stolle	4	6	6
(India) J Mukherjea	1	6	6
(New Zealand) O Parun	6	2	3
(Australia) B Bowrey	w/o
(Czechoslovakia) M Holeček
(Australia) B Howe	w/o
(Socialist Federal Republic of Yugoslavia) B Jovanović

Third round
(Australia) F Stolle	6	6
(India) J Mukherjea	3	3
(Australia) B Bowrey	2	6
(Australia) B Howe	6	2	r

Fourth round
(Australia) F Stolle	6	6
(Australia) B Bowrey	1	2

==== Section 7 ====
First round

Second round
(United States) D Ralston	6	6
(West Germany) I Buding	1	4
(United Kingdom) G Battrick	1	3
(South Africa) F McMillan	6	6
(South Africa) C Drysdale	6	4	7
(United States) T Gorman	2	6	5
(United States) D Dell	6	3	5
(New Zealand) John McDonald	3	6	7

Third round
(United States) D Ralston	6	6
(South Africa) F McMillan	1	0
(South Africa) C Drysdale	6	3	6
(New Zealand) John McDonald	3	6	3

Fourth round
(United States) D Ralston	6	6
(South Africa) C Drysdale	3	1

==== Section 8 ====
First round

Second round
(Australia) A Stone	14	5
(United States) M Riessen	16	7
(United States) R Holmberg	7	11
(United States) A Olmedo	5	9
(Australia) D Crealy	6	6
(Ecuador) P Guzmán	3	1
(Soviet Union) Viktor Kazarevitch	1	0
2	(Australia) K Rosewall	6	6

Third round
(United States) M Riessen	3	6	5
(United States) R Holmberg	6	0	7
(Australia) D Crealy	3	10	3
2	(Australia) K Rosewall	6	8	6

Fourth round
(United States) R Holmberg	1	6	6
2	(Australia) K Rosewall	6	2	2
