= 1980 Stella Artois Championships – Doubles =

Doubles
- 1980 Stella Artois Championships

Final
- Champions: (Australia) Rod Frawley (Australia) Geoff Masters
- Runners-up: (Australia) Paul McNamee (United States) Sherwood Stewart
- Score: 6–2, 4–6, 11–9

Details
- Draw: 32
- Seeds: 8

Events
Singles	Doubles
- Queen's Club Championships

Tim Gullikson and Tom Gullikson were the defending champions but lost in the semifinals to Rod Frawley and Geoff Masters.

Frawley and Masters won the doubles title at the 1980 Queen's Club Championships tennis tournament defeating Paul McNamee and Sherwood Stewart in the final 6–2, 4–6, 11–9.

== Seeds ==
1. (United States) Peter Fleming / (United States) John McEnroe (quarterfinals)
2. (United States) Robert Lutz / (United States) Stan Smith (semifinals)
3. (Australia) Paul McNamee / (United States) Sherwood Stewart (final)
4. (South Africa) Frew McMillan / (Mexico) Raúl Ramírez (second round)
5. (United States) John Sadri / (United States) Tim Wilkison (second round)
6. (United States) Tim Gullikson / (United States) Tom Gullikson (semifinals)
7. (India) Anand Amritraj / (India) Vijay Amritraj (quarterfinals)
8. (Australia) Colin Dibley / (United States) Dick Stockton (second round)

== Draw ==
Key

- Q = Qualifier
- WC = Wild card
- LL = Lucky loser
- Alt = Alternate
- ITF = ITF entry
- PR = Protected ranking
- SR = Special ranking
- SE = Special exempt
- JE = Junior exempt
- JR = Junior Accelerator Programme entrant
- CO = College Accelerator Programme entrant
- NG = Next Gen Accelerator Program entrant
- w/o = Walkover
- r = Retired
- d = Defaulted

=== Final ===
Semifinals
6	(United States) Tim Gullikson (United States) Tom Gullikson	7	4	4
(Australia) Rod Frawley (Australia) Geoff Masters	5	6	6
3	(Australia) Paul McNamee (United States) Sherwood Stewart	6	6
2	(United States) Robert Lutz (United States) Stan Smith	2	3

Final
(Australia) Rod Frawley (Australia) Geoff Masters	6	4	11
3	(Australia) Paul McNamee (United States) Sherwood Stewart	2	6	9

=== Top half ===
First round
1	(United States) P Fleming (United States) J McEnroe	6	7	7
(United States) R Tanner (United States) F Taygan	7	5	5
(United States) V Gerulaitis (Australia) F Stolle	6	6
(United States) P Du Pré (United States) D Ralston	4	2
(United States) P Rennert (United States) R Van't Hof	6	6	6
(Paraguay) F González (South Africa) J Kriek	4	7	3
(United States) F Buehning (United States) F McNair	4	5
6	(United States) Tim Gullikson (United States) Tom Gullikson	6	7
4	(South Africa) F McMillan (Mexico) R Ramírez	6	6	6
(United States) B Manson (United States) B Martin	4	7	1
(Brazil) T Koch (South Africa) R Moore	6	6
(Australia) J Alexander (Australia) P Dent	2	4
(Australia) R Frawley (Australia) G Masters	4	6	6
(Egypt) I El Shafei (Austria) P Feigl	6	4	3
(United Kingdom) N Sears (United Kingdom) J Whiteford	1	1
8	(Australia) C Dibley (United States) D Stockton	6	6

Second round
1	(United States) P Fleming (United States) J McEnroe	6	6
(United States) V Gerulaitis (Australia) F Stolle	2	3
(United States) P Rennert (United States) R Van't Hof	3	4
6	(United States) Tim Gullikson (United States) Tom Gullikson	6	6
4	(South Africa) F McMillan (Mexico) R Ramírez	6	4
(Brazil) T Koch (South Africa) R Moore	7	6
(Australia) R Frawley (Australia) G Masters	6	6
8	(Australia) C Dibley (United States) D Stockton	1	1

Quarterfinals
1	(United States) P Fleming (United States) J McEnroe	4	1
6	(United States) Tim Gullikson (United States) Tom Gullikson	6	6
(Brazil) T Koch (South Africa) R Moore	3	2
(Australia) R Frawley (Australia) G Masters	6	6

Semifinals
6	(United States) Tim Gullikson (United States) Tom Gullikson	7	4	4
(Australia) R Frawley (Australia) G Masters	5	6	6

=== Bottom half ===
First round
5	(United States) J Sadri (United States) T Wilkison	6	3	7
(Australia) D Collings (Australia) J Marks	4	6	5
(United States) T Graham (United States) B Nichols	7	7
(Brazil) M Hocevar (Brazil) J Soares	5	6
(Australia) M Edmondson (Australia) K Warwick	4	7	8
(United States) J Austin (United States) V Winitsky	6	6	6
(United States) V Amaya (United States) H Pfister	6	3	4
3	(Australia) P McNamee (United States) S Stewart	2	6	6
7	(India) A Amritraj (India) V Amritraj	3	7	6
(Australia) J James (Australia) C Kachel	6	6	2
(Australia) S Ball (Australia) R Case	2	7	9
(Australia) P Kronk (Australia) C Letcher	6	6	7
(Ecuador) A Gómez (Paraguay) V Pecci	6	1	6
(India) S Menon (South Africa) R Trogolo	3	6	2
(South Africa) K Curren (United States) S Denton	3	3
2	(United States) R Lutz (United States) S Smith	6	6

Second round
5	(United States) J Sadri (United States) T Wilkison	2	7	5
(United States) T Graham (United States) B Nichols	6	5	7
(Australia) M Edmondson (Australia) K Warwick	6	6	r
3	(Australia) P McNamee (United States) S Stewart	0	7
7	(India) A Amritraj (India) V Amritraj	6	6
(Australia) S Ball (Australia) R Case	2	2
(Ecuador) A Gómez (Paraguay) V Pecci	1	2
2	(United States) R Lutz (United States) S Smith	6	6

Quarterfinals
(United States) T Graham (United States) B Nichols	4	6
3	(Australia) P McNamee (United States) S Stewart	6	7
7	(India) A Amritraj (India) V Amritraj	3	1
2	(United States) R Lutz (United States) S Smith	6	6

Semifinals
3	(Australia) P McNamee (United States) S Stewart	6	6
2	(United States) R Lutz (United States) S Smith	2	3
