= 1971 Queen's Club Championships =

- Date: 14–19 June
- Edition: 72nd
- Category: Grand Prix
- Draw: 64S / 32D
- Surface: Wood / indoor (Note: Due to perdsitent rain during the tournament all matches, except eight on Tuesday and the finals, were played on indoor wooden courts); Grass / outdoor
- Location: London, United Kingdom
- Venue: Queen's Club

Champions

Men's singles
- (United States) Stan Smith

Women's singles
- (Australia) Margaret Court

Men's doubles
- (Netherlands) Tom Okker / (United States) Marty Riessen

Women's doubles
- (United States) Rosie Casals / (United States) Billie Jean King
- Queen's Club Championships

The 1971 Queen's Club Championships, also known as the Rothmans London Grass Court Championships, was a combined men's and women's tennis tournament played on grass courts at the Queen's Club in London in the United Kingdom that was part of the 1971 Pepsi-Cola Grand Prix. It was the 72nd edition of the tournament and was held from 14 June until 19 June 1971. Stan Smith and Margaret Court won the singles titles.

== Finals ==
=== Men's singles ===
(United States) Stan Smith defeated (Australia) John Newcombe 8–6, 6–3

- It was Smith's 3rd title of the year and the 12th of his career.

=== Women's singles ===
(Australia) Margaret Court defeated (United States) Billie Jean King 6–3, 3–6, 6–3

=== Men's doubles ===
(Netherlands) Tom Okker / (United States) Marty Riessen defeated (United States) Stan Smith / (United States) Erik van Dillen 8–6, 4–6, 10–8

- It was Okker's 3rd title of the year and the 16th of his career. It was Riessen's 5th title of the year and the 14th of his career.

=== Women's doubles ===
(United States) Rosie Casals / (United States) Billie Jean King defeated (United States) Mary–Ann Curtis / (United States) Valerie Ziegenfuss 6–2, 8–6
