= 1978 Queen's Club Championships – Doubles =

Doubles
- 1978 Queen's Club Championships

Final
- Champions: (South Africa) Bob Hewitt (South Africa) Frew McMillan
- Runners-up: (United States) Fred McNair (Mexico) Raúl Ramírez
- Score: 6–2, 7–5

Details
- Draw: 32
- Seeds: 8

Events
Singles	Doubles
- Queen's Club Championships

Anand Amritraj and Vijay Amritraj were the defending champions but lost in the second round to Bob Hewitt and Frew McMillan.

Hewitt and McMillan won the doubles title at the 1978 Queen's Club Championships tennis tournament defeating Fred McNair and Raúl Ramírez in the final 6–2, 7–5.

== Seeds ==
1. (South Africa) Bob Hewitt / (South Africa) Frew McMillan (champions)
2. (Poland) Wojciech Fibak / (Netherlands) Tom Okker (semifinals)
3. (Australia) John Alexander / (Australia) Phil Dent (second round)
4. (United States) Fred McNair / (Mexico) Raúl Ramírez (final)
5. (Australia) Ray Ruffels / (Australia) Allan Stone (second round)
6. (United States) Sandy Mayer / (United States) Sherwood Stewart (second round)
7. (Australia) Ross Case / (Australia) Geoff Masters (first round)
8. (Australia) Colin Dibley / (United States) Marty Riessen (first round)

== Draw ==
Key

- Q = Qualifier
- WC = Wild card
- LL = Lucky loser
- Alt = Alternate
- ITF = ITF entry
- PR = Protected ranking
- SR = Special ranking
- SE = Special exempt
- JE = Junior exempt
- JR = Junior Accelerator Programme entrant
- CO = College Accelerator Programme entrant
- NG = Next Gen Accelerator Program entrant
- w/o = Walkover
- r = Retired
- d = Defaulted

=== Final ===
Semifinals
1	(South Africa) Bob Hewitt (South Africa) Frew McMillan	6	9	15
(South Africa) Bernard Mitton (South Africa) Raymond Moore	8	8	13
4	(United States) Fred McNair (Mexico) Raúl Ramírez	6	9
2	(Poland) Wojciech Fibak (Netherlands) Tom Okker	4	7

Final
1	(South Africa) Bob Hewitt (South Africa) Frew McMillan	6	7
4	(United States) Fred McNair (Mexico) Raúl Ramírez	2	5

=== Top half ===
First round
1	(South Africa) B Hewitt (South Africa) F McMillan	6	6
(United States) T Leonard (United States) M Machette	3	1
(United States) M Fishbach (Italy) A Zugarelli	3	3
(India) A Amritraj (India) V Amritraj	6	6
(United States) P Fleming (United States) J McEnroe	6
(United States) P Du Pré (India) S Menon	0	r
(Brazil) C Kirmayr (Paraguay) V Pecci	3	2
6	(United States) S Mayer (United States) S Stewart	6	6
3	(Australia) J Alexander (Australia) P Dent	6	8	6
(United States) G Mayer (United States) H Pfister	2	9	4
(United Kingdom) J Lloyd (United Kingdom) D Lloyd	6	8
(Romania) I Năstase (Italy) A Panatta	4	6
(Australia) S Ball (Australia) K Warwick	4	0
(South Africa) B Mitton (South Africa) R Moore	6	6
(Switzerland) H Günthardt (United States) B Martin	6	9
8	(Australia) C Dibley (United States) M Riessen	4	8

Second round
1	(South Africa) B Hewitt (South Africa) F McMillan	3	6	10
(India) A Amritraj (India) V Amritraj	6	0	8
(United States) P Fleming (United States) J McEnroe	6	9
6	(United States) S Mayer (United States) S Stewart	4	8
3	(Australia) J Alexander (Australia) P Dent	5	4
(United Kingdom) J Lloyd (United Kingdom) D Lloyd	7	6
(South Africa) B Mitton (South Africa) R Moore	6	6	6
(Switzerland) H Günthardt (United States) B Martin	8	3	4

Quarterfinals
1	(South Africa) B Hewitt (South Africa) F McMillan	6	6
(United States) P Fleming (United States) J McEnroe	4	4
(United Kingdom) J Lloyd (United Kingdom) D Lloyd	4	6	4
(South Africa) B Mitton (South Africa) R Moore	6	4	6

Semifinals
1	(South Africa) B Hewitt (South Africa) F McMillan	6	9	15
(South Africa) B Mitton (South Africa) R Moore	8	8	13

=== Bottom half ===
First round
5	(Australia) R Ruffels (Australia) A Stone	6	6
(Sweden) O N Bengtson (United Kingdom) M Cox	3	3
(United States) Tim Gullikson (United States) Tom Gullikson	6	3	6
(United Kingdom) R Drysdale (United Kingdom) R Lewis	3	6	2
(United States) T Gorman (Australia) C Kachel	3	3
(Australia) J Newcombe (Australia) T Roche	6	6
(United Kingdom) J Feaver (Australia) J James	1	6	3
4	(United States) F McNair (Mexico) R Ramírez	6	4	6
7	(Australia) R Case (Australia) G Masters	3	6	8
(Australia) M Edmondson (Australia) J Marks	6	3	10
(Argentina) J L Clerc (Chile) B Prajoux	6	6
(United Kingdom) B Mottram (United Kingdom) R Taylor	4	4
(Australia) B Carmichael (United States) B Teacher	6	2
(Chile) Á Fillol (Chile) J Fillol	8	6
(Egypt) I El Shafei (New Zealand) B Fairlie	6	4	4
2	(Poland) W Fibak (Netherlands) T Okker	3	6	6

Second round
5	(Australia) R Ruffels (Australia) A Stone	5	6	5
(United States) Tim Gullikson (United States) Tom Gullikson	7	4	7
(Australia) J Newcombe (Australia) T Roche	3	6	3
4	(United States) F McNair (Mexico) R Ramírez	6	4	6
(Australia) M Edmondson (Australia) J Marks	6	4	4
(Argentina) J L Clerc (Chile) B Prajoux	0	6	6
(Chile) Á Fillol (Chile) J Fillol	4	4
2	(Poland) W Fibak (Netherlands) T Okker	6	6

Quarterfinals
(United States) Tim Gullikson (United States) Tom Gullikson	2	8
4	(United States) F McNair (Mexico) R Ramírez	6	9
(Argentina) J L Clerc (Chile) B Prajoux	8	3
2	(Poland) W Fibak (Netherlands) T Okker	9	6

Semifinals
4	(United States) F McNair (Mexico) R Ramírez	6	9
2	(Poland) W Fibak (Netherlands) T Okker	4	7
