= 1971 Queen's Club Championships – Men's doubles =

Men's doubles
- 1971 Queen's Club Championships

Final
- Champions: (Netherlands) Tom Okker (United States) Marty Riessen
- Runners-up: (United States) Stan Smith (United States) Erik van Dillen
- Score: 8–6, 4–6, 10–8

Details
- Draw: 25
- Seeds: 2

Events
Singles	men	women
Doubles	men	women
- Queen's Club Championships

Tom Okker and Marty Riessen were the defending champions.

Okker and Riessen successfully defended their title, defeating Stan Smith and Erik van Dillen 8–6, 4–6, 10–8 in the final.

== Seeds ==
1. (Australia) John Newcombe / (Australia) Tony Roche (quarterfinals)
2. (Netherlands) Tom Okker / (United States) Marty Riessen (champions)

== Draw ==
Key

- Q = Qualifier
- WC = Wild card
- LL = Lucky loser
- Alt = Alternate
- ITF = ITF entry
- PR = Protected ranking
- SR = Special ranking
- SE = Special exempt
- JE = Junior exempt
- JR = Junior Accelerator Programme entrant
- CO = College Accelerator Programme entrant
- NG = Next Gen Accelerator Program entrant
- w/o = Walkover
- r = Retired
- d = Defaulted

=== Finals ===
Semifinals
(United States) Stan Smith (United States) Erik van Dillen	6	7
(United States) Jim McManus (Soviet Union) Alex Metreveli	4	5
(Australia) Bill Bowrey (Australia) Owen Davidson	1^{r}
2	(Netherlands) Tom Okker (United States) Marty Riessen	4

Final
(United States) Stan Smith (United States) Erik van Dillen	6	6	8
2	(Netherlands) Tom Okker (United States) Marty Riessen	8	4	10

=== Top half ===
First round
(United States) F Schroeder (United Kingdom) J Drobný	2	2
(United States) S Smith (United States) E van Dillen	6	6
(United States) A Fox (Czechoslovakia) Š Koudelka	3	4
(Austria) H Kary (Australia) F Sedgman	6	6
(Australia) B Carmichael (Australia) R Ruffels	6	6
(Czechoslovakia) J Kodeš (Czechoslovakia) F Pala	4	0
(Hungary) S Baranyi (Hungary) P Szőke	6	6
(South Africa) R Moore (Italy) A Panatta	4	3
(United States) J McManus (Soviet Union) A Metreveli	3	6	6
(United States) F Froehling (United States) RP Gonzales	6	4	4

Second round
1	(Australia) J Newcombe (Australia) T Roche	6	8	6
(Australia) T Addison (Australia) R Keldie	4	9	3
(United States) R Lutz (United States) C Pasarell	4	8
(United States) S Smith (United States) E van Dillen	6	9
(Austria) H Kary (Australia) F Sedgman	7	3
(Australia) B Carmichael (Australia) R Ruffels	9	6
(Hungary) S Baranyi (Hungary) P Szőke	5	3
(United States) J McManus (Soviet Union) A Metreveli	7	6

Quarterfinals
1	(Australia) J Newcombe (Australia) T Roche	3	7
(United States) S Smith (United States) E van Dillen	6	9
(Australia) B Carmichael (Australia) R Ruffels	6	6	10
(United States) J McManus (Soviet Union) A Metreveli	1	8	12

Semifinals
(United States) S Smith (United States) E van Dillen	6	7
(United States) J McManus (Soviet Union) A Metreveli	4	5

=== Bottom half ===
First round
(Australia) B Bowrey (Australia) O Davidson	9	6
(New Zealand) O Parun (Socialist Federal Republic of Yugoslavia) N Špear	8	4
(United Kingdom) G Battrick (United Kingdom) P Curtis	w/o
(Australia) K Fletcher (United States) C Graebner
(Colombia) W Álvarez (Mexico) J Loyo-Mayo	4	2
(United Arab Republic) I El Shafei (New Zealand) B Fairlie	6	6
(Australia) R Case (Australia) C Dibley	5	9	3
(United States) A Ashe (United States) D Ralston	7	8	6

Second round
(Australia) B Bowrey (Australia) O Davidson	7	6
(United Kingdom) G Battrick (United Kingdom) P Curtis	5	3
(United Arab Republic) I El Shafei (New Zealand) B Fairlie	6	6
(United States) A Ashe (United States) D Ralston	3	3
(United States) T Gorman (United States) C Richey	4	4
(Australia) J Alexander (Australia) P Dent	6	6
(Rhodesia) H Irvine (United States) A Pattison	6	6	13
2	(Netherlands) T Okker (United States) M Riessen	8	4	15

Quarterfinals
(Australia) B Bowrey (Australia) O Davidson	6	6
(United Arab Republic) I El Shafei (New Zealand) B Fairlie	3	4
(Australia) J Alexander (Australia) P Dent	6	6	13
2	(Netherlands) T Okker (United States) M Riessen	8	4	15

Semifinals
(Australia) B Bowrey (Australia) O Davidson	1^{r}
2	(Netherlands) T Okker (United States) M Riessen	4
