= John Paish =

English tennis player

- Country (sports): (United Kingdom) Great Britain
- Residence: Wimbledon, London
- Born: 25 March 1948 (age 78) Croydon, England
- Plays: Left-handed

Singles
- Career record: 29–53
- Career titles: 0
- Highest ranking: No. 80 (15 October 1973)

Grand Slam singles results
- Australian Open: 1R (1973)
- French Open: 2R (1973)
- Wimbledon: 3R (1972)
- US Open: 1R (1971, 1972)

Doubles
- Career record: 27–46
- Career titles: 0

Grand Slam doubles results
- Australian Open: 3R (1973)
- French Open: 2R (1972, 1973)
- Wimbledon: SF (1973)
- US Open: 2R (1972)

John Paish (born 25 March 1948) is a former professional tennis player from England who competed for Great Britain. He is the son of tennis player and administrator Geoffrey Paish.

Paish played a Davis Cup tie for the Great British team in 1972, against France. He lost both his singles rubbers, to Pierre Barthès and Patrick Proisy, but won the doubles rubber, beside David Lloyd. It was also with Lloyd that he made the semi-finals of the 1973 Wimbledon Championships. He was runner-up to Jimmy Connors at the 1972 Queen's Club Championships.

== Grand Prix career finals ==
=== Singles: 1 (0–1) ===
Result	W-L	Date	Tournament	Surface	Opponent	Score
Loss	0–1	Jun 1972	Queen's Club, UK	Grass	(United States) Jimmy Connors	2–6, 3–6

=== Doubles: 1 (0–1) ===
Result	W-L	Date	Tournament	Surface	Partner	Opponents	Score
Loss	0–1	Jul 1971	Newport, UK	Grass	(United Kingdom) John Clifton	(Australia) Ken Rosewall (United Kingdom) Roger Taylor	5–7, 6–3, 2–6
