= 1981 ATP Challenger Series =

Details
- Duration: 12 January 1981 – 13 December 1981
- Edition: 4th
- Tournaments: 52

Achievements (singles)

The ATP Challenger Series is the second-tier tour for professional tennis organised by the Association of Tennis Professionals (ATP). The 1981 ATP Challenger Series calendar comprises 46 tournaments, with prize money ranging from $25,000 up to $50,000.

Several additional events were held and considered into ATP rankings but are not shown currently on ATP Tour website: Ituzaingo and Mar del Plata (Argentina), Yokohama (Japan), Lee-on-Solent (UK), Ulm (Germany), Campinas (Brazil) and White City/Sydney (Australia).

== Schedule ==
=== January ===
Week of	Tournament	Champions	Runners-up	Semifinalists	Quarterfinalists
January 5	No tournaments scheduled.				
January 12	Perth Challenger; Perth, Australia; Grass – $25,000 – 64S/32D; Singles draw – Doubles draw	(Australia) John Fitzgerald; 6–2, 6–2	(Australia) Syd Ball	(Australia) Colin Dibley (South Africa) Eddie Edwards	(United States) Maurice Hunter (Australia) John James (Australia) Brad Drewett (Australia) Brad Guan
January 12	Perth Challenger; Perth, Australia; Grass – $25,000 – 64S/32D; Singles draw – Doubles draw	(Australia) Syd Ball (Australia) Cliff Letcher; 3–6, 7–6, 8–6	(Australia) Colin Dibley (Australia) John James	(Australia) Colin Dibley (South Africa) Eddie Edwards	(United States) Maurice Hunter (Australia) John James (Australia) Brad Drewett (Australia) Brad Guan
January 19	No tournaments scheduled.				
January 26	No tournaments scheduled.				

=== February ===
Week of	Tournament	Champions	Runners-up	Semifinalists	Quarterfinalists
February 2	No tournaments scheduled.				
February 9	Ituzaingo (Buenos Aires), Argentina; Clay – $25,000 – 32S/16D	(United States) Eric Fromm 6-4, 6-1	(Argentina) Eduardo Bengoechea	(France) Christophe Freyss (West Germany) Peter Elter	(France) Dominique Bedel (Spain) Gabriel Urpí (Argentina) Gustavo Guerrero (Argentina) Carlos Castellan
February 9	Ituzaingo (Buenos Aires), Argentina; Clay – $25,000 – 32S/16D	(Argentina) Fernando Dalla Fontana (Argentina) Roberto Carruthers 6-2 2-6 6-4	(Bolivia) Ramiro Benavides (Chile) Heinz Gildemeister	(France) Christophe Freyss (West Germany) Peter Elter	(France) Dominique Bedel (Spain) Gabriel Urpí (Argentina) Gustavo Guerrero (Argentina) Carlos Castellan
February 16	Mar del Plata, Argentina; Clay – $25,000 – 32S/16D	(Argentina) Eduardo Bengoechea 3-6 6-4 10-8	(Bolivia) Mario Martinez	(West Germany) Peter Elter (Spain) Gabriel Urpí	(Argentina) Fernando Dalla Fontana (Argentina) Gustavo Guerrero (Argentina) Alejandro Cerundolo (Argentina) Andres Molina
February 16	Mar del Plata, Argentina; Clay – $25,000 – 32S/16D	Doubles unknown	Doubles unknown	(West Germany) Peter Elter (Spain) Gabriel Urpí	(Argentina) Fernando Dalla Fontana (Argentina) Gustavo Guerrero (Argentina) Alejandro Cerundolo (Argentina) Andres Molina
February 23	Ogun Challenger; Ogun, Nigeria; Clay – $25,000 – 32S/16D; Singles draw – Doubles draw	(United States) Craig Wittus; 2–6, 6–3, 6–0	(United States) Mark Vines	(Australia) Steve Docherty (United States) Ian Harris	(Austria) Robert Reininger (Nigeria) Romanus Chuks Nwazu (Austria) Filip Krajcik (Italy) Gianluca Rinaldini
February 23	Ogun Challenger; Ogun, Nigeria; Clay – $25,000 – 32S/16D; Singles draw – Doubles draw	(United States) Ian Harris (United States) Craig Wittus; 7–6, 7–6	(United States) Guy Fritz (Canada) Harry Fritz	(Australia) Steve Docherty (United States) Ian Harris	(Austria) Robert Reininger (Nigeria) Romanus Chuks Nwazu (Austria) Filip Krajcik (Italy) Gianluca Rinaldini
February 23	Río de la Plata Challenger; Club Bellavista, Buenos Aires, Argentina; Clay – $25,000 – 32S/16D; Singles draw – Doubles draw	(United States) Eric Fromm; 6–2, 6–1	(Argentina) Fernando Dalla Fontana	(Spain) Gabriel Urpí (Argentina) Roberto Argüello	(Chile) Juan Núñez (Bolivia) Ramiro Benavides (Uruguay) Diego Pérez (Argentina) Carlos Landó
February 23	Río de la Plata Challenger; Club Bellavista, Buenos Aires, Argentina; Clay – $25,000 – 32S/16D; Singles draw – Doubles draw	(Argentina) Roberto Carruthers (Argentina) Carlos Landó; 0–6, 6–1, 6–3	(United States) Charles Strode (United States) Morris Strode	(Spain) Gabriel Urpí (Argentina) Roberto Argüello	(Chile) Juan Núñez (Bolivia) Ramiro Benavides (Uruguay) Diego Pérez (Argentina) Carlos Landó

Note: The 3 Argentinian tournaments serie was called "Circuito del Plata" and was reportedly completed by a 4th tournament in Montevideo, Uruguay, which most likely did not take place eventually.

=== March ===
Week of	Tournament	Champions	Runners-up	Semifinalists	Quarterfinalists
March 2	Lagos Open; Lagos, Nigeria; Hard – $50,000 – 32S/16D; Singles draw – Doubles draw	(United States) Larry Stefanki; 5–7, 6–3, 6–0	(Austria) Peter Feigl	(Italy) Marco Bellini (Austria) Robert Reininger	(United States) Craig Wittus (France) Gilles Moretton (Italy) Marzio Miloro (Italy) Patrizio Parrini
March 2	Lagos Open; Lagos, Nigeria; Hard – $50,000 – 32S/16D; Singles draw – Doubles draw	(United States) Bruce Kleege (United States) Larry Stefanki; 6–2, 3–6, 6–3	(United States) Ian Harris (United States) Craig Wittus	(Italy) Marco Bellini (Austria) Robert Reininger	(United States) Craig Wittus (France) Gilles Moretton (Italy) Marzio Miloro (Italy) Patrizio Parrini
March 9	Kaduna Challenger; Kaduna, Nigeria; Clay – $25,000 – 32S/16D; Singles draw – Doubles draw	(Italy) Gianluca Rinaldini; 6–3, 6–4	(Austria) Gerald Mild	(Italy) Massimo Grassotti (Italy) Famiano Meneschincheri	(United States) Bruce Kleege (Italy) Patrizio Parrini (Netherlands) Frank Lapre (Italy) Marzio Miloro
March 9	Kaduna Challenger; Kaduna, Nigeria; Clay – $25,000 – 32S/16D; Singles draw – Doubles draw	(United States) Junie Chatman (United States) Mark Vines; 6–1, 6–2	(United States) Ian Harris (United States) Craig Wittus	(Italy) Massimo Grassotti (Italy) Famiano Meneschincheri	(United States) Bruce Kleege (Italy) Patrizio Parrini (Netherlands) Frank Lapre (Italy) Marzio Miloro
March 16	No tournaments scheduled.				
March 23	No tournaments scheduled.				
March 30	Barcelona-1 Challenger; Barcelona, Spain; Clay – $25,000 – 32S/16D; Singles draw – Doubles draw	(West Germany) Ulrich Pinner; 6–3, 6–1	(Spain) Miguel Mir	(France) Bernard Fritz (Colombia) Jairo Velasco Sr.	(Sweden) Mats Wilander (Sweden) Joakim Nyström (Spain) Sergio Casal (West Germany) Werner Zirngibl
March 30	Barcelona-1 Challenger; Barcelona, Spain; Clay – $25,000 – 32S/16D; Singles draw – Doubles draw	(United States) Junie Chatman (Socialist Federal Republic of Yugoslavia) Marko Ostoja; 6–4, 7–5	(Paraguay) Francisco González (Canada) Derek Segal	(France) Bernard Fritz (Colombia) Jairo Velasco Sr.	(Sweden) Mats Wilander (Sweden) Joakim Nyström (Spain) Sergio Casal (West Germany) Werner Zirngibl

=== April ===
Week of	Tournament	Champions	Runners-up	Semifinalists	Quarterfinalists
April 6	Kyoto Challenger; Kyoto, Japan; Clay – $25,000 – 32S/16D; Singles draw – Doubles draw	(United States) Ron Hightower; 7–5, 7–6	(United States) Matt Doyle	(New Zealand) Russell Simpson (United States) Dave Siegler	(West Germany) Damir Keretić (Australia) Syd Ball (United States) Mike Cahill (United States) James Delaney
April 6	Kyoto Challenger; Kyoto, Japan; Clay – $25,000 – 32S/16D; Singles draw – Doubles draw	(United States) Matt Mitchell (United States) Bill Maze; 7–6, 6–3	(United States) Bruce Kleege (United States) Dave Siegler	(New Zealand) Russell Simpson (United States) Dave Siegler	(West Germany) Damir Keretić (Australia) Syd Ball (United States) Mike Cahill (United States) James Delaney
April 13	Barcelona-2 Challenger; Barcelona, Spain; Clay – $25,000 – 32S/16D; Singles draw – Doubles draw	(Uruguay) Diego Pérez; 6–4, 3–6, 6–2	(Peru) Fernando Maynetto	(France) Jérôme Potier (West Germany) Christoph Zipf	(Colombia) Jairo Velasco Sr. (Australia) Trevor Allan (France) Patrick Proisy (Italy) Claudio Panatta
April 13	Barcelona-2 Challenger; Barcelona, Spain; Clay – $25,000 – 32S/16D; Singles draw – Doubles draw	(United States) Tim Garcia (United States) Bruce Nichols; 6–4, 6–4	(Italy) Gianni Marchetti (Italy) Enzo Vattuone	(France) Jérôme Potier (West Germany) Christoph Zipf	(Colombia) Jairo Velasco Sr. (Australia) Trevor Allan (France) Patrick Proisy (Italy) Claudio Panatta
April 13	Curitiba Challenger; Curitiba, Brazil; Clay – $25,000 – 32S/16D; Singles draw – Doubles draw	(Brazil) Carlos Kirmayr; 6–1, 6–1	(Argentina) Alejandro Ganzábal	(Chile) Belus Prajoux (Colombia) Javier Restrepo	(Brazil) Ivan Kley (Argentina) Alejandro Cerundolo (Uruguay) José Luis Damiani (Argentina) Thomas Stålhandske
April 13	Curitiba Challenger; Curitiba, Brazil; Clay – $25,000 – 32S/16D; Singles draw – Doubles draw	(Brazil) Carlos Kirmayr (Brazil) Cássio Motta; 7–6, 6–4	(Uruguay) José Luis Damiani (Brazil) Thomaz Koch	(Chile) Belus Prajoux (Colombia) Javier Restrepo	(Brazil) Ivan Kley (Argentina) Alejandro Cerundolo (Uruguay) José Luis Damiani (Argentina) Thomas Stålhandske
April 13	San Luis Potosí Challenger; San Luis Potosí, Mexico; Clay – $25,000 – 64S/32D; Singles draw – Doubles draw	(United States) Rick Fagel; 7–6, 6–1	(United States) Steve Meister	(Australia) Brad Drewett (Mexico) Roberto Chávez	(United States) Ian Harris (Mexico) Octavio Martínez (United States) Nial Brash (United States) Egan Adams
April 13	San Luis Potosí Challenger; San Luis Potosí, Mexico; Clay – $25,000 – 64S/32D; Singles draw – Doubles draw	(Australia) Brad Drewett (United States) George Hardie; 5–7, 6–3, 7–6	(United States) Rich Andrews (United States) Kevin Cook	(Australia) Brad Drewett (Mexico) Roberto Chávez	(United States) Ian Harris (Mexico) Octavio Martínez (United States) Nial Brash (United States) Egan Adams
April 13	Osawa Head Tennis Tournament Yokohama, Japan; Clay – $25,000 – 32S/16D	(United States) Jimmy Arias 6-4, 4-6, 7-5	(United States) Billy Martin	(United States) Ron Hightower 2nd Semifinalist unknown	Quarterfinalists unknown
April 13	Osawa Head Tennis Tournament Yokohama, Japan; Clay – $25,000 – 32S/16D	Doubles unknown	Doubles unknown	(United States) Ron Hightower 2nd Semifinalist unknown	Quarterfinalists unknown
April 20	Tokyo Challenger; Tokyo, Japan; Clay – $25,000 – 32S/16D; Singles draw – Doubles draw	(Australia) John Fitzgerald; 6–2, 6–3	(Switzerland) Roland Stadler	(Italy) Gianluca Rinaldini (United States) Mike Cahill	(United States) Bruce Kleege (United States) Matt Doyle (United States) James Delaney (United States) Billy Martin
April 20	Tokyo Challenger; Tokyo, Japan; Clay – $25,000 – 32S/16D; Singles draw – Doubles draw	(Australia) John Fitzgerald (Australia) Wayne Pascoe; 6–1, 7–6	(Australia) Cliff Letcher (Australia) Warren Maher	(Italy) Gianluca Rinaldini (United States) Mike Cahill	(United States) Bruce Kleege (United States) Matt Doyle (United States) James Delaney (United States) Billy Martin
April 27	Berlin Challenger; Berlin, West Germany; Clay – $25,000 – 32S/16D; Singles draw – Doubles draw	(West Germany) Werner Zirngibl; 6–3, 7–6	(United States) Erick Iskersky	(West Germany) Andreas Maurer (West Germany) Wolfgang Popp	(Czechoslovakia) Pavel Huťka (Peru) Fernando Maynetto (France) Jérôme Potier (West Germany) Ulrich Marten
April 27	Berlin Challenger; Berlin, West Germany; Clay – $25,000 – 32S/16D; Singles draw – Doubles draw	(West Germany) Andreas Maurer (West Germany) Wolfgang Popp; 4–6, 6–3, 6–0	(United States) Tim Garcia (Peru) Fernando Maynetto	(West Germany) Andreas Maurer (West Germany) Wolfgang Popp	(Czechoslovakia) Pavel Huťka (Peru) Fernando Maynetto (France) Jérôme Potier (West Germany) Ulrich Marten
April 27	Nagoya Challenger; Nagoya, Japan; Hard – $25,000 – 32S/16D; Singles draw – Doubles draw	(New Zealand) Russell Simpson; 6–3, 3–6, 6–3	(Australia) Charlie Fancutt	(United States) Mike Gandolfo (United States) James Delaney	(United States) Larry Davidson (United States) Matt Doyle (United States) Matt Mitchell (Australia) Warren Maher
April 27	Nagoya Challenger; Nagoya, Japan; Hard – $25,000 – 32S/16D; Singles draw – Doubles draw	(United States) Billy Martin (New Zealand) Russell Simpson; 7–6, 6–2	(United States) Matt Mitchell (United States) Bill Maze	(United States) Mike Gandolfo (United States) James Delaney	(United States) Larry Davidson (United States) Matt Doyle (United States) Matt Mitchell (Australia) Warren Maher
April 27	Parioli Challenger; Parioli, Italy; Clay – $25,000 – 32S/16D; Singles draw – Doubles draw	(Chile) Alejandro Pierola; 6–4, 3–6, 6–4	(Italy) Corrado Barazzutti	(Socialist Federal Republic of Yugoslavia) Marko Ostoja (Argentina) Alejandro Ganzábal	(Spain) Miguel Mir (France) Henri Leconte (Italy) Claudio Panatta (Romania) Florin Segărceanu
April 27	Parioli Challenger; Parioli, Italy; Clay – $25,000 – 32S/16D; Singles draw – Doubles draw	(France) Henri Leconte (France) Gilles Moretton; 6–4, 6–3	(Romania) Florin Segărceanu (United States) Ben Testerman	(Socialist Federal Republic of Yugoslavia) Marko Ostoja (Argentina) Alejandro Ganzábal	(Spain) Miguel Mir (France) Henri Leconte (Italy) Claudio Panatta (Romania) Florin Segărceanu
April 27	West Worthing Challenger; West Worthing, Great Britain; Clay – $25,000 – 32S/16D; Singles draw – Doubles draw	(United Kingdom) John Feaver; 4–6, 7–5, 6–3	(United Kingdom) Jonathan Smith	(South Africa) Raymond Moore (United Kingdom) Andrew Jarrett	(United Kingdom) Richard Lewis (South Africa) Danie Visser (United States) Tony Graham (South Africa) Deon Joubert
April 27	West Worthing Challenger; West Worthing, Great Britain; Clay – $25,000 – 32S/16D; Singles draw – Doubles draw	(Australia) Chris Johnstone (New Zealand) Chris Lewis; 6–2, 6–3	(South Africa) Rory Chappell (South Africa) Schalk van der Merwe	(South Africa) Raymond Moore (United Kingdom) Andrew Jarrett	(United Kingdom) Richard Lewis (South Africa) Danie Visser (United States) Tony Graham (South Africa) Deon Joubert

=== May ===
Week of	Tournament	Champions	Runners-up	Semifinalists	Quarterfinalists
May 4	Chichester Challenger; Chichester, Great Britain; Grass – $25,000 – 32S/16D; Singles draw – Doubles draw	(Israel) Steve Krulevitz; 3–6, 6–3, 6–3	(United States) Mark Vines	(Sweden) Jan Gunnarsson (South Africa) David Schneider	(South Africa) Raymond Moore (South Africa) Deon Joubert (United States) Tony Graham (Australia) Chris Johnstone
May 4	Chichester Challenger; Chichester, Great Britain; Grass – $25,000 – 32S/16D; Singles draw – Doubles draw	(United States) Martin Davis (United States) Chris Dunk; 7–6, 6–1	(United Kingdom) Andrew Jarrett (United Kingdom) Jonathan Smith	(Sweden) Jan Gunnarsson (South Africa) David Schneider	(South Africa) Raymond Moore (South Africa) Deon Joubert (United States) Tony Graham (Australia) Chris Johnstone
May 4	Galatina Challenger; Galatina, Italy; Clay – $25,000 – 32S/16D; Singles draw – Doubles draw	(West Germany) Werner Zirngibl; 7–6, 7–5	(Sweden) Hans Simonsson	(Argentina) Roberto Argüello (Chile) Alejandro Pierola	(Argentina) Fernando Dalla Fontana (Bolivia) Ramiro Benavides (France) Christophe Casa (Argentina) Carlos Gattiker
May 4	Galatina Challenger; Galatina, Italy; Clay – $25,000 – 32S/16D; Singles draw – Doubles draw	(Argentina) Carlos Gattiker (Italy) Patrizio Parrini; 6–4, 5–7, 7–5	(Argentina) Roberto Carruthers (Argentina) Fernando Dalla Fontana	(Argentina) Roberto Argüello (Chile) Alejandro Pierola	(Argentina) Fernando Dalla Fontana (Bolivia) Ramiro Benavides (France) Christophe Casa (Argentina) Carlos Gattiker
May 4	Mexicali Challenger; Mexicali, Mexico; Hard – $25,000 – 32S/16D; Singles draw – Doubles draw	(United States) James Delaney; 6–3, 5–7, 7–5	(Australia) Ross Case	(United States) Lloyd Bourne (India) Anand Amritraj	(United States) Matt Mitchell (United States) George Hardie (Brazil) João Soares (United States) Erik van Dillen
May 4	Mexicali Challenger; Mexicali, Mexico; Hard – $25,000 – 32S/16D; Singles draw – Doubles draw	(Australia) Syd Ball (Australia) Ross Case; 6–3, 6–3	(United States) John James (India) Sashi Menon	(United States) Lloyd Bourne (India) Anand Amritraj	(United States) Matt Mitchell (United States) George Hardie (Brazil) João Soares (United States) Erik van Dillen
May 11	Guadalajara Open; Guadalajara, Mexico; Clay – $25,000 – 32S/16D; Singles draw – Doubles draw	(Brazil) João Soares; 6–4, 7–5	(United States) Matt Anger	(Australia) Ross Case (United States) Glen Holroyd	(United States) Scott Kidd (United States) Lloyd Bourne (United States) George Hardie (India) Anand Amritraj
May 11	Guadalajara Open; Guadalajara, Mexico; Clay – $25,000 – 32S/16D; Singles draw – Doubles draw	(United States) Glen Holroyd (United States) Eric Sherbeck; 6–7, 6–4, 7–6	(United States) Bruce Kleege (United States) Andy Kohlberg	(Australia) Ross Case (United States) Glen Holroyd	(United States) Scott Kidd (United States) Lloyd Bourne (United States) George Hardie (India) Anand Amritraj
May 11	Lee-on-the-Solent, Great Britain; Clay – $25,000 – 32S/16D	(Sweden) Jan Gunnarsson 6-4; 6-4	(Israel) Steve Krulevitz	(United Kingdom) Jonathan Smith (United States) Craig Wittus	(South Africa) Mike Myburg (United Kingdom) Andrew Jarrett (United Kingdom) Nigel Sears (United Kingdom) Mark Cox
May 11	Lee-on-the-Solent, Great Britain; Clay – $25,000 – 32S/16D	(United States) Martin Davis (United States) Chris Dunk	(South Africa) Danie Visser (South Africa) Tian Viljoen	(United Kingdom) Jonathan Smith (United States) Craig Wittus	(South Africa) Mike Myburg (United Kingdom) Andrew Jarrett (United Kingdom) Nigel Sears (United Kingdom) Mark Cox
May 18	No tournaments scheduled.				
May 25	No tournaments scheduled.				

=== June ===
Week of	Tournament	Champions	Runners-up	Semifinalists	Quarterfinalists
June 1	Napoli Challenger; Naples, Italy; Clay – $25,000 – 32S/16D; Singles draw – Doubles draw	(West Germany) Damir Keretić; 4–6, 6–2, 6–2	(Argentina) Gustavo Guerrero	(France) Jérôme Potier (Argentina) Roberto Argüello	(West Germany) Christoph Zipf (Italy) Gianluca Rinaldini (Switzerland) Roland Stadler (France) Christophe Casa
June 1	Napoli Challenger; Naples, Italy; Clay – $25,000 – 32S/16D; Singles draw – Doubles draw	(Chile) Ricardo Acuña (Bolivia) Ramiro Benavides; 6–1, 6–1	(Chile) Alejandro Pierola (Argentina) Ricardo Rivera	(France) Jérôme Potier (Argentina) Roberto Argüello	(West Germany) Christoph Zipf (Italy) Gianluca Rinaldini (Switzerland) Roland Stadler (France) Christophe Casa
June 8	No tournaments scheduled.				
June 15	No tournaments scheduled.				
June 22	Cuneo Challenger; Cuneo, Italy; Clay – $25,000 – 32S/16D; Singles draw – Doubles draw	(Spain) Juan Avendaño; 7–5, 6–3	(Spain) Roberto Vizcaíno	(Spain) Sergio Casal (Bolivia) Mario Martinez	(Argentina) Guillermo Aubone (Italy) Gianni Marchetti (Argentina) Carlos Gattiker (Bolivia) Ramiro Benavides
June 22	Cuneo Challenger; Cuneo, Italy; Clay – $25,000 – 32S/16D; Singles draw – Doubles draw	(Argentina) Guillermo Aubone (Argentina) Ricardo Cano; 7–6, 7–5	(Chile) Ricardo Acuña (Bolivia) Ramiro Benavides	(Spain) Sergio Casal (Bolivia) Mario Martinez	(Argentina) Guillermo Aubone (Italy) Gianni Marchetti (Argentina) Carlos Gattiker (Bolivia) Ramiro Benavides
June 29	Torino Challenger; Turin, Italy; Clay – $25,000 – 32S/16D; Singles draw – Doubles draw	(Peru) Pablo Arraya; 6–4, 3–6, 6–3	(Sweden) Stefan Simonsson	(Chile) Jaime Fillol (Spain) Sergio Casal	(Italy) Claudio Panatta (South Africa) Derek Tarr (United States) Jim Gurfein (United States) Blaine Willenborg
June 29	Torino Challenger; Turin, Italy; Clay – $25,000 – 32S/16D; Singles draw – Doubles draw	(United States) Lloyd Bourne (United States) Blaine Willenborg; 5–7, 6–4, 6–2	(Chile) Jaime Fillol (Socialist Federal Republic of Yugoslavia) Željko Franulović	(Chile) Jaime Fillol (Spain) Sergio Casal	(Italy) Claudio Panatta (South Africa) Derek Tarr (United States) Jim Gurfein (United States) Blaine Willenborg
June 29	Travemünde Challenger; Travemünde, West Germany; Clay – $25,000 – 64S/32D; Singles draw – Doubles draw	(West Germany) Ulrich Pinner; 6–4, 4–6, 6–3	(West Germany) Peter Elter	(West Germany) Werner Zirngibl (Australia) Warren Maher	(West Germany) Andreas Maurer (Hungary) Zoltán Kuhárszky (New Zealand) David Mustard (West Germany) Damir Keretić
June 29	Travemünde Challenger; Travemünde, West Germany; Clay – $25,000 – 64S/32D; Singles draw – Doubles draw	(Australia) Brad Guan (Australia) Wayne Hampson; 6–3, 6–4	(New Zealand) Bruce Derlin (New Zealand) David Mustard	(West Germany) Werner Zirngibl (Australia) Warren Maher	(West Germany) Andreas Maurer (Hungary) Zoltán Kuhárszky (New Zealand) David Mustard (West Germany) Damir Keretić

=== July ===
Week of	Tournament	Champions	Runners-up	Semifinalists	Quarterfinalists
July 6	Essen Challenger; Essen, West Germany; Clay – $25,000 – 64S/32D; Singles draw – Doubles draw	(Australia) Chris Johnstone; 7–5, 7–6	(West Germany) Andreas Maurer	(Spain) Roberto Vizcaíno (West Germany) Helmut Beermann	(Sweden) Jan Gunnarsson (Australia) Cliff Letcher (Argentina) Guillermo Aubone (Chile) Alejandro Pierola
July 6	Essen Challenger; Essen, West Germany; Clay – $25,000 – 64S/32D; Singles draw – Doubles draw	(Sweden) Jan Gunnarsson (Sweden) Stefan Svensson; 6–1, 6–1	(Australia) Ernie Ewert (West Germany) Damir Keretić	(Spain) Roberto Vizcaíno (West Germany) Helmut Beermann	(Sweden) Jan Gunnarsson (Australia) Cliff Letcher (Argentina) Guillermo Aubone (Chile) Alejandro Pierola
July 6	Sanremo Challenger; Sanremo, Italy; Clay – $25,000 – 32S/16D; Singles draw – Doubles draw	(Italy) Corrado Barazzutti; 7–5, 6–0	(Romania) Ilie Năstase	(United States) Jim Gurfein (Peru) Pablo Arraya	(France) Jérôme Vanier (Ecuador) Raúl Viver (Italy) Gianni Marchetti (Italy) Fabio Moscino
July 6	Sanremo Challenger; Sanremo, Italy; Clay – $25,000 – 32S/16D; Singles draw – Doubles draw	(United States) Bob Berger (United States) Blaine Willenborg; 7–6, 6–3	(Italy) Luca Bottazzi (Italy) Francesco Cancellotti	(United States) Jim Gurfein (Peru) Pablo Arraya	(France) Jérôme Vanier (Ecuador) Raúl Viver (Italy) Gianni Marchetti (Italy) Fabio Moscino
July 13	La Spezia Challenger; La Spezia, Italy; Clay – $25,000 – 32S/16D; Singles draw – Doubles draw	(Italy) Adriano Panatta; 6–2, 6–0	(Socialist Federal Republic of Yugoslavia) Željko Franulović	(United Kingdom) John Feaver (Peru) Pablo Arraya	(France) Jérôme Vanier (United States) Scott Lipton (Colombia) Javier Restrepo (Italy) Ferrante Rocchi
July 13	La Spezia Challenger; La Spezia, Italy; Clay – $25,000 – 32S/16D; Singles draw – Doubles draw	(Socialist Federal Republic of Yugoslavia) Željko Franulović (Italy) Adriano Panatta; 6–2, 6–4	(Italy) Gianni Marchetti (Italy) Enzo Vattuone	(United Kingdom) John Feaver (Peru) Pablo Arraya	(France) Jérôme Vanier (United States) Scott Lipton (Colombia) Javier Restrepo (Italy) Ferrante Rocchi
July 20	No tournaments scheduled.				
July 27	Rio de Janeiro Open; Rio de Janeiro, Brazil; Clay – $25,000 – 64S/32D; Singles draw – Doubles draw	(Brazil) Júlio Góes; 6–3, 6–3	(Peru) Pablo Arraya	(Brazil) Carlos Kirmayr (Argentina) Gustavo Tiberti	(Argentina) Carlos Gattiker (Argentina) Guillermo Aubone (United States) Bruce Kleege (Brazil) Ney Keller
July 27	Rio de Janeiro Open; Rio de Janeiro, Brazil; Clay – $25,000 – 64S/32D; Singles draw – Doubles draw	(Brazil) Givaldo Barbosa (Brazil) João Soares; 6–4, 6–3	(Argentina) Guillermo Aubone (Argentina) Carlos Landó	(Brazil) Carlos Kirmayr (Argentina) Gustavo Tiberti	(Argentina) Carlos Gattiker (Argentina) Guillermo Aubone (United States) Bruce Kleege (Brazil) Ney Keller
July 27	Zell Am See Challenger; Zell Am See, Austria; Clay – $50,000 – 32S/16D; Singles draw – Doubles draw	(Spain) Fernando Luna; 6–4, 6–2	(Czechoslovakia) Jiří Hřebec	(Australia) Wayne Hampson (Sweden) Anders Järryd	(Czechoslovakia) Pavel Huťka (Switzerland) Roland Stadler (Austria) Gerald Mild (Bolivia) Ramiro Benavides
July 27	Zell Am See Challenger; Zell Am See, Austria; Clay – $50,000 – 32S/16D; Singles draw – Doubles draw	(Chile) Ricardo Acuña (Bolivia) Ramiro Benavides; 6–7, 7–6, 7–6, 7–5	(Australia) Wayne Hampson (Australia) Chris Johnstone	(Australia) Wayne Hampson (Sweden) Anders Järryd	(Czechoslovakia) Pavel Huťka (Switzerland) Roland Stadler (Austria) Gerald Mild (Bolivia) Ramiro Benavides
July 27	Müller-Cup 81 Ulm, Germany; Clay – $25,000 – 48S/?D	(Czechoslovakia) Tomas Smid 6-2, 6-4	(West Germany) Andreas Maurer	(Spain) Miguel Mir (United States) Scott Lipton	(West Germany) Hans-Dieter Beutel (West Germany) Hartmut Kirchhuebel (West Germany) Helmut Beermann (United Kingdom) Mark M. Cox
July 27	Müller-Cup 81 Ulm, Germany; Clay – $25,000 – 48S/?D	(United States) Bud Cox (Australia) Brad Guan 6-3, 6-2	(United States) Bob Blazekovic (United States) Erick Iskersky	(Spain) Miguel Mir (United States) Scott Lipton	(West Germany) Hans-Dieter Beutel (West Germany) Hartmut Kirchhuebel (West Germany) Helmut Beermann (United Kingdom) Mark M. Cox

The four Brazilian Challengers in July and August constituted a circuit named "Itau Cup" . The best 8 finishers qualified for a Masters event held in São Paulo on the August 25th week, which in 1981 was won by Carlos Kirmayr. This Masters event did not count toward ATP rankings.

=== August ===
Week of	Tournament	Champions	Runners-up	Semifinalists	Quarterfinalists
August 3	Ostend Challenger; Ostend, Belgium; Clay – $25,000 – 32S/16D; Singles draw – Doubles draw	(France) Jérôme Potier; 6–2, 6–2	(Czechoslovakia) Miroslav Lacek	(Australia) Trevor Allan (Austria) Hans-Peter Kandler	(Sweden) Anders Järryd (France) Éric Deblicker (Sweden) Stefan Svensson (Czechoslovakia) Jiří Granát
August 3	Ostend Challenger; Ostend, Belgium; Clay – $25,000 – 32S/16D; Singles draw – Doubles draw	(United Kingdom) John Feaver (Australia) Chris Johnstone; 6–4, 6–4	(Australia) Cliff Letcher (Australia) Warren Maher	(Australia) Trevor Allan (Austria) Hans-Peter Kandler	(Sweden) Anders Järryd (France) Éric Deblicker (Sweden) Stefan Svensson (Czechoslovakia) Jiří Granát
August 3	Itau Cup Porto Alegre; Porto Alegre, Brazil; Clay – $25,000 – 64S/32D; Singles draw – Doubles draw	(Brazil) Carlos Kirmayr; 7–6, 6–3	(Brazil) Júlio Góes	(Argentina) Roberto Argüello (Argentina) Gustavo Tiberti	(Argentina) Guillermo Aubone (Brazil) Givaldo Barbosa (Brazil) Ney Keller (United States) Bruce Kleege
August 3	San Benedetto Challenger; San Benedetto, Italy; Clay – $25,000 – 32S/16D; Singles draw – Doubles draw	(Italy) Adriano Panatta; 6–3, 6–2	(Italy) Corrado Barazzutti	(Italy) Paolo Bertolucci (Socialist Federal Republic of Yugoslavia) Željko Franulović	(Italy) Ferrante Rocchi (Italy) Gianni Marchetti (Italy) Antonio Zugarelli (Czechoslovakia) Pavel Huťka
August 3	San Benedetto Challenger; San Benedetto, Italy; Clay – $25,000 – 32S/16D; Singles draw – Doubles draw	(Italy) Paolo Bertolucci (Italy) Adriano Panatta; 6–4, 6–3	(Italy) Marco Alciati (United States) Mike Barr	(Italy) Paolo Bertolucci (Socialist Federal Republic of Yugoslavia) Željko Franulović	(Italy) Ferrante Rocchi (Italy) Gianni Marchetti (Italy) Antonio Zugarelli (Czechoslovakia) Pavel Huťka
August 10	Itau Cup Brasília; Brasília, Brazil; Clay – $25,000 – 64S/32D; Singles draw – Doubles draw	(Peru) Pablo Arraya; 6–3, 3–6, 6–4	(Brazil) Thomaz Koch	(Argentina) Ricardo Rivera (Argentina) Alejandro Gattiker	(Brazil) Marcos Hocevar (United States) Bruce Kleege (Brazil) João Soares (Argentina) Thomas Stålhandske
August 10	Itau Cup Brasília; Brasília, Brazil; Clay – $25,000 – 64S/32D; Singles draw – Doubles draw	(Brazil) Givaldo Barbosa (Brazil) João Soares; W/O	(Argentina) Carlos Gattiker (Argentina) Alejandro Gattiker	(Argentina) Ricardo Rivera (Argentina) Alejandro Gattiker	(Brazil) Marcos Hocevar (United States) Bruce Kleege (Brazil) João Soares (Argentina) Thomas Stålhandske
August 10	Royan Challenger; Royan, France; Clay – $25,000 – 32S/16D; Singles draw – Doubles draw	(Czechoslovakia) Jaroslav Navrátil; 6–1, 6–4, 6–3	(Sweden) Jan Gunnarsson	(France) Georges Goven (Zimbabwe) Haroon Ismail	(Sweden) Anders Järryd (Australia) Peter Doohan (France) Jérôme Vanier (United States) Erick Iskersky
August 10	Royan Challenger; Royan, France; Clay – $25,000 – 32S/16D; Singles draw – Doubles draw	(Australia) Cliff Letcher (Australia) Warren Maher; 7–5, 7–5	(Sweden) Anders Järryd (Sweden) Stefan Simonsson	(France) Georges Goven (Zimbabwe) Haroon Ismail	(Sweden) Anders Järryd (Australia) Peter Doohan (France) Jérôme Vanier (United States) Erick Iskersky
August 10	Bara Challenger*; Bara, Spain; Clay – $25,000 – 32S/16D; Singles draw – Doubles draw	(New Zealand) Bruce Derlin; 7–6, 6–3	(United Kingdom) Richard Lewis	(United States) Junie Chatman (United States) Gonzalo Núñez	(United States) Cary Stansbury (Hungary) Zoltán Kuhárszky (United States) Blaine Willenborg (Spain) Roberto Vizcaíno
August 10	Bara Challenger*; Bara, Spain; Clay – $25,000 – 32S/16D; Singles draw – Doubles draw	(Czechoslovakia) Jiří Hřebec (Czechoslovakia) Pavel Huťka; 7–5, 4–6, 9–7	(Spain) Ángel Giménez (Colombia) Jairo Velasco Sr.	(United States) Junie Chatman (United States) Gonzalo Núñez	(United States) Cary Stansbury (Hungary) Zoltán Kuhárszky (United States) Blaine Willenborg (Spain) Roberto Vizcaíno
August 17	Le Touquet Challenger; Le Touquet, France; Clay – $25,000 – 32S/16D; Singles draw – Doubles draw	(Sweden) Stefan Simonsson; 6–2, 6–1, 7–5	(France) Georges Goven	(Czechoslovakia) Jiří Granát (France) Jérôme Vanier	(West Germany) Harald Theissen (Zimbabwe) Haroon Ismail (France) Éric Deblicker (France) Patrice Kuchna
August 17	Le Touquet Challenger; Le Touquet, France; Clay – $25,000 – 32S/16D; Singles draw – Doubles draw	(Sweden) Anders Järryd (Sweden) Stefan Simonsson; 7–5, 7–5	(Czechoslovakia) Libor Pimek (Czechoslovakia) Miroslav Lacek	(Czechoslovakia) Jiří Granát (France) Jérôme Vanier	(West Germany) Harald Theissen (Zimbabwe) Haroon Ismail (France) Éric Deblicker (France) Patrice Kuchna
August 17	Itau Cup Campinas Campinas, Brasil; Clay – $25,000 – 64S/32D	(Brazil) Marcos Hocevar 6-1, 3-6, 6-3	(Peru) Pablo Arraya	(Brazil) João Soares (Brazil) Julio Goes	(Argentina) Guillermo Aubone (Brazil) Ney Keller (United States) Bruce Kleege (Argentina) Carlos Gattiker
August 17	Itau Cup Campinas Campinas, Brasil; Clay – $25,000 – 64S/32D	(Brazil) Cassio Motta (Brazil) Ney Keller 6-2, 6-4	(Argentina) Andres Molina (Brazil) Roger Guedes	(Brazil) João Soares (Brazil) Julio Goes	(Argentina) Guillermo Aubone (Brazil) Ney Keller (United States) Bruce Kleege (Argentina) Carlos Gattiker
August 17	Tarragona Challenger*; Tarragona, Spain; Clay – $25,000 – 32S/16D; Singles draw – Doubles draw	(Colombia) Jairo Velasco Sr. 6–4, 6–2	(Spain) Eduardo Osta	(Czechoslovakia) Jiří Hřebec (Argentina) Gustavo Tiberti	(Italy) Vittorio Magnelli (Argentina) Carlos Castellan (Spain) Gabriel Urpí (Czechoslovakia) Pavel Huťka
August 17	Tarragona Challenger*; Tarragona, Spain; Clay – $25,000 – 32S/16D; Singles draw – Doubles draw	(Hungary) Zoltán Kuhárszky (United Kingdom) Richard Lewis; 6–2, 3–6, 6–3	(South Africa) Robbie Venter (United States) Blaine Willenborg	(Czechoslovakia) Jiří Hřebec (Argentina) Gustavo Tiberti	(Italy) Vittorio Magnelli (Argentina) Carlos Castellan (Spain) Gabriel Urpí (Czechoslovakia) Pavel Huťka
August 24	Brussels Challenger; Brussels, Belgium; Clay – $25,000 – 32S/16D; Singles draw – Doubles draw	(France) Georges Goven; 6–7, 7–6, 6–3	(United States) Erick Iskersky	(South Africa) Mike Myburg (Belgium) Thierry Stevaux	(Czechoslovakia) Jaroslav Navrátil (France) Christophe Casa (Italy) Franco Merlone (Sweden) Stefan Svensson
August 24	Brussels Challenger; Brussels, Belgium; Clay – $25,000 – 32S/16D; Singles draw – Doubles draw	(Belgium) Bernard Boileau (Belgium) Alain Brichant; 7–5, 6–2	(South Africa) Mike Myburg (South Africa) Frank Punčec	(South Africa) Mike Myburg (Belgium) Thierry Stevaux	(Czechoslovakia) Jaroslav Navrátil (France) Christophe Casa (Italy) Franco Merlone (Sweden) Stefan Svensson
August 24	Reus Challenger; Reus, Spain; Clay – $25,000 – 64S/32D; Singles draw – Doubles draw	(France) Jean-François Caujolle; 7–6, 6–0	(Chile) Alejandro Pierola	(New Zealand) Bruce Derlin (Spain) Gabriel Urpí	(United States) Joe Ragland (Spain) Eduardo Osta (United States) Junie Chatman (Spain) Sergio Casal
August 24	Reus Challenger; Reus, Spain; Clay – $25,000 – 64S/32D; Singles draw – Doubles draw	(United States) Egan Adams (South Africa) Robbie Venter; 6–7, 6–4, 6–4	(United States) Junie Chatman (New Zealand) Bruce Derlin	(New Zealand) Bruce Derlin (Spain) Gabriel Urpí	(United States) Joe Ragland (Spain) Eduardo Osta (United States) Junie Chatman (Spain) Sergio Casal
August 31	No tournaments scheduled.				

*Bara and Tarragona tournaments were held one week later as recorded in the ATP Tour website. They constituted a mini circuit together with Reus, Layetano and the 2 spring events in Barcelona ("Catalonian Tournaments" / "Circuito Costa Dorada") - Source AS, Marca (Spain)

=== September ===
Week of	Tournament	Champions	Runners-up	Semifinalists	Quarterfinalists
September 7	Hypo Group Tennis International; Bari, Italy; Clay – $25,000 – 32S/16D; Singles draw – Doubles draw	(Hungary) Zoltán Kuhárszky; 6–4, 6–0	(Italy) Paolo Bertolucci	(Chile) Alejandro Pierola (South Africa) Robbie Venter	(Italy) Vittorio Magnelli (Italy) Franco Merlone (Italy) Gianluca Rinaldini (Netherlands) Huub van Boeckel
September 7	Hypo Group Tennis International; Bari, Italy; Clay – $25,000 – 32S/16D; Singles draw – Doubles draw	(United States) Ian Harris (Chile) Belus Prajoux; 6–4, 6–2	(Italy) Gianni Marchetti (Chile) Alejandro Pierola	(Chile) Alejandro Pierola (South Africa) Robbie Venter	(Italy) Vittorio Magnelli (Italy) Franco Merlone (Italy) Gianluca Rinaldini (Netherlands) Huub van Boeckel
September 14	International Tournament of Messina; Messina, Italy; Clay – $25,000 – 32S/16D; Singles draw – Doubles draw	(Bolivia) Mario Martinez; 6–4, 7–5	(South Africa) Robbie Venter	(South Africa) Brent Pirow (Italy) Corrado Barazzutti	(Italy) Gianni Marchetti (South Africa) Rory Chappell (Italy) Gianluca Rinaldini (Italy) Ferrante Rocchi
September 14	International Tournament of Messina; Messina, Italy; Clay – $25,000 – 32S/16D; Singles draw – Doubles draw	(Chile) Alejandro Pierola (Chile) Belus Prajoux; 3–6, 6–4, 7–6	(Italy) Mario Calautti (Italy) Roberto Calautti	(South Africa) Brent Pirow (Italy) Corrado Barazzutti	(Italy) Gianni Marchetti (South Africa) Rory Chappell (Italy) Gianluca Rinaldini (Italy) Ferrante Rocchi
September 28	Athens Challenger; Athens, Greece; Clay – $25,000 – 32S/16D; Singles draw – Doubles draw	(United States) Vincent Van Patten; 7–5, 6–4	(Hungary) Zoltán Kuhárszky	(United States) Erick Iskersky (Finland) Leo Palin	(Austria) Bernhard Pils (Sweden) Thomas Högstedt (United Kingdom) John Feaver (Sweden) Per Hjertquist
September 28	Athens Challenger; Athens, Greece; Clay – $25,000 – 32S/16D; Singles draw – Doubles draw	(United States) Vincent Van Patten (United States) Nels Van Patten; 7–6, 7–6	(Socialist Federal Republic of Yugoslavia) Nanad Ilekovlc (Greece) George Kalovelonis	(United States) Erick Iskersky (Finland) Leo Palin	(Austria) Bernhard Pils (Sweden) Thomas Högstedt (United Kingdom) John Feaver (Sweden) Per Hjertquist

=== October ===
Week of	Tournament	Champions	Runners-up	Semifinalists	Quarterfinalists
October 12*	Layetano Challenger; Layetano, Spain; Clay – $25,000 – 32S/16D; Singles draw – Doubles draw	(Spain) José García Requena; 6–1, 6–7, 7–5	(United States) Mark Dickson	(Spain) Eduardo Osta (Spain) Juan Avendaño	(Uruguay) Diego Pérez (Spain) Roberto Vizcaíno (Belgium) Jan Vanlangendonck (Spain) Gabriel Urpí
October 12*	Layetano Challenger; Layetano, Spain; Clay – $25,000 – 32S/16D; Singles draw – Doubles draw	(United States) Gonzalo Núñez (Ecuador) Hugo Núñez; 6–4, 7–5	(South Africa) Rory Chappell (United States) John Van Nostrand	(Spain) Eduardo Osta (Spain) Juan Avendaño	(Uruguay) Diego Pérez (Spain) Roberto Vizcaíno (Belgium) Jan Vanlangendonck (Spain) Gabriel Urpí
October 26	Goldair Australian Men's Hard Court Championships Sydney (White City), Australia Hard - $25,000 - 64S/32D	(Australia) Kim Warwick 6-4, 7-6	(Australia) Greg Whitecross	(United States) Matt Mitchell (United States) Andy Andrews	(Australia) Dale Collings (United States) John Benson (Australia) Warren Maher (New Zealand) David Mustard
October 26	Goldair Australian Men's Hard Court Championships Sydney (White City), Australia Hard - $25,000 - 64S/32D	(United States) Joel Hoffmann (United States) David Dowlen 9-7 (proset)	(United States) Matt Mitchell (United States) Tony Graham	(United States) Matt Mitchell (United States) Andy Andrews	(Australia) Dale Collings (United States) John Benson (Australia) Warren Maher (New Zealand) David Mustard

*Layetano was held in October and not on the week of 21 September as mentioned in ATP database (Source: As and Marca archives)

=== November ===
Week of	Tournament	Champions	Runners-up	Semifinalists	Quarterfinalists
November 2	No tournaments scheduled.				
November 9	No tournaments scheduled.				
November 16	Benin City Challenger; Benin City, Nigeria; Hard – $50,000 – 32S/16D; Singles draw – Doubles draw	(Zimbabwe) Haroon Ismail; 7–5, 6–4, 6–3	(Nigeria) Nduka Odizor	(United States) Gonzalo Núñez (United Kingdom) Richard Lewis	(Burkina Faso) Amani Jumatano (United Kingdom) Andrew Jarrett (Greece) Arthur Anastopoulo (United Kingdom) Jeremy Dier
November 16	Benin City Challenger; Benin City, Nigeria; Hard – $50,000 – 32S/16D; Singles draw – Doubles draw	(United Kingdom) Andrew Jarrett (United Kingdom) Richard Lewis; 6–3, 6–4, 7–5	(United Kingdom) Jeremy Dier (Zimbabwe) Haroon Ismail	(United States) Gonzalo Núñez (United Kingdom) Richard Lewis	(Burkina Faso) Amani Jumatano (United Kingdom) Andrew Jarrett (Greece) Arthur Anastopoulo (United Kingdom) Jeremy Dier
November 23	No tournaments scheduled.				
November 30	Bahia Challenger; Bahia, Brazil; Clay – $50,000 – 32S/16D; Singles draw – Doubles draw	(United States) Pat DuPré; 5–7, 7–6, 6–4	(Brazil) João Soares	(Spain) José López-Maeso (West Germany) Damir Keretić	(United States) Mel Purcell (Brazil) Givaldo Barbosa (United States) Jimmy Arias (Italy) Claudio Panatta
November 30	Bahia Challenger; Bahia, Brazil; Clay – $50,000 – 32S/16D; Singles draw – Doubles draw	(Brazil) Carlos Kirmayr (Brazil) Cássio Motta; 7–6, 6–4	(United States) Pat DuPré (United States) Mel Purcell	(Spain) José López-Maeso (West Germany) Damir Keretić	(United States) Mel Purcell (Brazil) Givaldo Barbosa (United States) Jimmy Arias (Italy) Claudio Panatta

=== December ===
Week of	Tournament	Champions	Runners-up	Semifinalists	Quarterfinalists
December 7	Brisbane Challenger; Brisbane, Australia; Grass – $30,000 – 64S/32D; Singles draw – Doubles draw	(Australia) Chris Johnstone; 6–4, 6–4	(Australia) Phil Dent	(Australia) Cliff Letcher (United States) Matt Mitchell	(New Zealand) Bruce Derlin (United States) Andy Andrews (United States) Steve Meister (New Zealand) David Mustard
December 7	Brisbane Challenger; Brisbane, Australia; Grass – $30,000 – 64S/32D; Singles draw – Doubles draw	(Australia) Chris Johnstone (Australia) Craig A. Miller; 6–4, 7–5	(Australia) Brad Drewett (Australia) Warren Maher	(Australia) Cliff Letcher (United States) Matt Mitchell	(New Zealand) Bruce Derlin (United States) Andy Andrews (United States) Steve Meister (New Zealand) David Mustard

== Statistical information ==
These tables present the number of singles (S) and doubles (D) titles won by each player and each nation during the season, within all the tournament categories of the 1981 ATP Challenger Series, as published on the ATP Tour website. The players/nations are sorted by: (1) total number of titles (a doubles title won by two players representing the same nation counts as only one win for the nation); (2) a singles > doubles hierarchy; (3) alphabetical order (by family names for players).

=== Titles won by player ===
Total	Player	S	D
5	Carlos Kirmayr (BRA)	3	2
5	Chris Johnstone (AUS)	2	3
4	Adriano Panatta (ITA)	2	2
3	John Fitzgerald (AUS)	2	1
3	João Soares (BRA)	1	2
2	Pablo Arraya (PER)	2	0
2	Ulrich Pinner (FRG)	2	0
2	Werner Zirngibl (FRG)	2	0
2	John Feaver (GBR)	1	1
2	Zoltan Kuharszky (HUN)	1	1
2	Alejandro Pierola (CHI)	1	1
2	Stefan Simonsson (SWE)	1	1
2	Russell Simpson (NZL)	1	1
2	Larry Stefanki (USA)	1	1
2	Vincent Van Patten (USA)	1	1
2	Craig Wittus (USA)	1	1
2	Ricardo Acuña (CHI)	0	2
2	Syd Ball (AUS)	0	2
2	Givaldo Barbosa (BRA)	0	2
2	Ramiro Benavides (BOL)	0	2
2	Junie Chatman (USA)	0	2
2	Ian Harris (USA)	0	2
2	Cliff Letcher (AUS)	0	2
2	Richard Lewis (GBR)	0	2
2	Cássio Motta (BRA)	0	2
2	Belus Prajoux (CHI)	0	2
2	Blaine Willenborg (USA)	0	2
1	Juan Avendaño (ESP)	1	0
1	Corrado Barazzutti (ITA)	1	0
1	Jean-François Caujolle (FRA)	1	0
1	James Delaney (USA)	1	0
1	Bruce Derlin (NZL)	1	0
1	Pat Du Pré (USA)	1	0
1	Rick Fagel (USA)	1	0
1	Eric Fromm (USA)	1	0
1	José García-Requena (ESP)	1	0
1	Júlio Góes (BRA)	1	0
1	Georges Goven (FRA)	1	0
1	Ron Hightower (USA)	1	0
1	Haroon Ismail (ZIM)	1	0
1	Damir Keretić (FRG)	1	0
1	Steve Krulevitz (ISR)	1	0
1	Fernando Luna (ESP)	1	0
1	Mario Martinez (BOL)	1	0
1	Jaroslav Navrátil (TCH)	1	0
1	Diego Pérez (URU)	1	0
1	Jérôme Potier (FRA)	1	0
1	Gianluca Rinaldini (ITA)	1	0
1	Jairo Velasco Sr. (COL)	1	0
1	Egan Adams (USA)	0	1
1	Guillermo Aubone (ARG)	0	1
1	Bob Berger (USA)	0	1
1	Paolo Bertolucci (ITA)	0	1
1	Bernard Boileau (BEL)	0	1
1	Lloyd Bourne (USA)	0	1
1	Alain Brichant (BEL)	0	1
1	Ricardo Cano (ARG)	0	1
1	Roberto Carruthers (ARG)	0	1
1	David Carter (AUS)	0	1
1	Ross Case (AUS)	0	1
1	Martin Davis (USA)	0	1
1	Brad Drewett (AUS)	0	1
1	Chris Dunk (USA)	0	1
1	Željko Franulović (YUG)	0	1
1	Tim Garcia (USA)	0	1
1	Carlos Gattiker (ARG)	0	1
1	Brad Guan (AUS)	0	1
1	Jan Gunnarsson (SWE)	0	1
1	Wayne Hampson (AUS)	0	1
1	George Hardie (USA)	0	1
1	Glen Holroyd (USA)	0	1
1	Jiří Hřebec (TCH)	0	1
1	Pavel Hutka (TCH)	0	1
1	Andrew Jarrett (GBR)	0	1
1	Anders Järryd (SWE)	0	1
1	Bruce Kleege (USA)	0	1
1	Paul Kronk (AUS)	0	1
1	Carlos Landó (ARG)	0	1
1	Henri Leconte (FRA)	0	1
1	Chris Lewis (NZL)	0	1
1	Warren Maher (AUS)	0	1
1	Billy Martin (USA)	0	1
1	Andreas Maurer (FRG)	0	1
1	Bill Maze (USA)	0	1
1	Craig A. Miller (AUS)	0	1
1	Matt Mitchell (USA)	0	1
1	Gilles Moretton (FRA)	0	1
1	Bruce Nichols (USA)	0	1
1	Gonzalo Núñez (USA)	0	1
1	Hugo Núñez (ECU)	0	1
1	Marko Ostoja (YUG)	0	1
1	Patrizio Parrini (ITA)	0	1
1	Wayne Pascoe (AUS)	0	1
1	Wolfgang Popp (FRG)	0	1
1	Eric Sherbeck (USA)	0	1
1	Stefan Svensson (SWE)	0	1
1	Nels Van Patten (USA)	0	1
1	Robbie Venter (RSA)	0	1
1	Mark Vines (USA)	0	1

=== Titles won by nation ===
Total	Nation	S	D
24	United States (USA)	8	16
14	Australia (AUS)	4	10
9	Brazil (BRA)	5	4
7	Italy (ITA)	4	3
6	West Germany (FRG)	5	1
5	Chile (CHI)	1	4
4	France (FRA)	3	1
4	New Zealand (NZL)	2	2
4	Great Britain (GBR)	1	3
3	Spain (ESP)	3	0
3	Bolivia (BOL)	1	2
3	Sweden (SWE)	1	2
3	Argentina (ARG)	0	3
2	Peru (PER)	2	0
2	Czechoslovakia (TCH)	1	1
2	Hungary (HUN)	1	1
2	Yugoslavia (YUG)	0	2
1	Colombia (COL)	1	0
1	Israel (ISR)	1	0
1	Uruguay (URU)	1	0
1	Zimbabwe (ZIM)	1	0
1	Belgium (BEL)	0	1
1	Ecuador (ECU)	0	1
1	South Africa (RSA)	0	1

== See also ==
- 1981 Grand Prix
- Association of Tennis Professionals
- International Tennis Federation
