= 1980 ATP Challenger Series =

Tennis tour

Details
- Duration: 3 March 1980 – 7 December 1980
- Edition: 3rd
- Tournaments: 24

Achievements (singles)

The ATP Challenger Series is the second-tier tour for professional tennis organised by the Association of Tennis Professionals (ATP). The 1980 ATP Challenger Series calendar comprises 24 tournaments, with prize money ranging from $25,000 up to $50,000.

== Schedule ==
=== March ===
Week of	Tournament	Champions	Runners-up	Semifinalists	Quarterfinalists
March 3	Kaduna Challenger; Kaduna, Nigeria; Clay – $25,000 – 32S/16D; Singles draw – Doubles draw	(United States) Chris Mayotte; 1–6, 6–3, 6–3	(United Kingdom) John Feaver	(Austria) Roland Steigler (United States) Mark Turpin	(Austria) Filip Krajcik (Canada) Harry Fritz (United States) Toby Crabel (United States) Larry Stefanki
March 3	Kaduna Challenger; Kaduna, Nigeria; Clay – $25,000 – 32S/16D; Singles draw – Doubles draw	(United States) Chris Mayotte (United States) Larry Stefanki; 6–4, 3–6, 6–2	(United Kingdom) Robin Drysdale (United Kingdom) John Feaver	(Austria) Roland Steigler (United States) Mark Turpin	(Austria) Filip Krajcik (Canada) Harry Fritz (United States) Toby Crabel (United States) Larry Stefanki
March 10	No tournaments scheduled.				
March 17	ATP Linz; Linz, Austria; Hard (i) – $25,000 – 32S/16D; Singles draw – Doubles draw	(United States) Tony Graham; 3–6, 7–6, 6–4	(New Zealand) Onny Parun	(West Germany) Andreas Maurer (United Kingdom) John Feaver	(United States) Bruce Foxworth (Austria) Roland Steigler (United States) Chris Mayotte (Austria) Hans Kary
March 17	ATP Linz; Linz, Austria; Hard (i) – $25,000 – 32S/16D; Singles draw – Doubles draw	(United States) Tony Graham (Chile) Belus Prajoux; 6–2, 4–6, 7–5	(Austria) Robert Reininger (Austria) Helmar Stiegler	(West Germany) Andreas Maurer (United Kingdom) John Feaver	(United States) Bruce Foxworth (Austria) Roland Steigler (United States) Chris Mayotte (Austria) Hans Kary
March 24	No tournaments scheduled.				
March 31	San Luis Potosí Challenger; San Luis Potosí, Mexico; Clay – $25,000 – 32S/16D; Singles draw – Doubles draw	(Mexico) Adolfo González; 6–4, 6–4	(Mexico) Guillermo Stevens	(United States) Rick Fagel (Bolivia) Ramiro Benavides	(Mexico) Joaquín Loyo Mayo (United States) Larry Loeb (Austria) Filip Krajcik (Australia) Brad Guan
March 31	San Luis Potosí Challenger; San Luis Potosí, Mexico; Clay – $25,000 – 32S/16D; Singles draw – Doubles draw	(United States) Mike Barr (Canada) Réjean Genois; 6–4, 6–4	(Bolivia) Ramiro Benavides (Spain) Gabriel Urpí	(United States) Rick Fagel (Bolivia) Ramiro Benavides	(Mexico) Joaquín Loyo Mayo (United States) Larry Loeb (Austria) Filip Krajcik (Australia) Brad Guan
March 31	Shimizu Challenger; Shimizu, Japan; Hard – $25,000 – 32S/16D; Singles draw – Doubles draw	(Switzerland) Markus Günthardt; 2–6, 6–4, 6–3	(Australia) Cliff Letcher	(Japan) Tsuyoshi Fukui (Australia) John Marks	(Australia) Chris Kachel (Japan) Jun Kamiwazumi (Canada) Robert Bettauer (Australia) Wayne Pascoe
March 31	Shimizu Challenger; Shimizu, Japan; Hard – $25,000 – 32S/16D; Singles draw – Doubles draw	(Australia) Syd Ball (Australia) Cliff Letcher; 6–7, 6–3, 6–2	(Australia) Chris Kachel (Australia) John Marks	(Japan) Tsuyoshi Fukui (Australia) John Marks	(Australia) Chris Kachel (Japan) Jun Kamiwazumi (Canada) Robert Bettauer (Australia) Wayne Pascoe

=== April ===
Week of	Tournament	Champions	Runners-up	Semifinalists	Quarterfinalists
April 7	Maebashi Challenger; Maebashi, Japan; Hard – $25,000 – 32S/16D; Singles draw – Doubles draw	(Australia) Greg Whitecross; 2–6, 6–4, 7–6	(Australia) Craig A. Miller	(Switzerland) Markus Günthardt (Australia) John Fitzgerald	(United States) Mike Shore (Philippines) Beeyong Sison (West Germany) Peter Holl (Japan) Jun Kuki
April 7	Maebashi Challenger; Maebashi, Japan; Hard – $25,000 – 32S/16D; Singles draw – Doubles draw	(Australia) Chris Kachel (Australia) John Marks; 6–4, 7–6	(Australia) Syd Ball (Australia) Cliff Letcher	(Switzerland) Markus Günthardt (Australia) John Fitzgerald	(United States) Mike Shore (Philippines) Beeyong Sison (West Germany) Peter Holl (Japan) Jun Kuki
April 14	Mizuno Open Chigasaki, Japan; Hard – $8,000 – 32S/16D	(Japan) Tsuyoshi Fukui 6-2, 6-2	(Australia) Cliff Letcher	(New Zealand) Russell Simpson (Australia) Craig A. Miller	(Australia) Syd Ball (Australia) Greg Whitecross others unknown
April 14	Mizuno Open Chigasaki, Japan; Hard – $8,000 – 32S/16D	(Australia) Syd Ball (Australia) Cliff Letcher 7-6, 3-6, 6-3	(Australia) Wayne Pascoe (New Zealand) Russell Simpson	(New Zealand) Russell Simpson (Australia) Craig A. Miller	(Australia) Syd Ball (Australia) Greg Whitecross others unknown
April 21	Dunlop Masters 1980; Toyota, Japan; Hard – $33,000 – 32S/16D; Singles draw – Doubles draw	(New Zealand) Russell Simpson; 6–4, 6–4	(Australia) Brad Drewett	(Australia) Chris Johnstone (Australia) John Fitzgerald	(Japan) Jun Kuki (Australia) Cliff Letcher (Japan) Tsuyoshi Fukui (Venezuela) Jorge Andrew
April 21	Dunlop Masters 1980; Toyota, Japan; Hard – $33,000 – 32S/16D; Singles draw – Doubles draw	(Australia) Syd Ball (Australia) Cliff Letcher; 6–3, 6–4	(Australia) Chris Kachel (New Zealand) Russell Simpson	(Australia) Chris Johnstone (Australia) John Fitzgerald	(Japan) Jun Kuki (Australia) Cliff Letcher (Japan) Tsuyoshi Fukui (Venezuela) Jorge Andrew
April 28	Parioli Challenger; Parioli, Italy; Clay – $25,000 – 32S/16D; Singles draw – Doubles draw	(Italy) Corrado Barazzutti; 1–6, 6–3, 6–2	(France) Dominique Bedel	(New Zealand) Onny Parun (Italy) Paolo Bertolucci	(United States) Michael Grant (Australia) Terry Rocavert (Austria) Hans Kary (Colombia) Jairo Velasco Sr.
April 28	Parioli Challenger; Parioli, Italy; Clay – $25,000 – 32S/16D; Singles draw – Doubles draw	(West Germany) Klaus Eberhard (West Germany) Ulrich Marten; 3–6, 6–3, 7–5	(West Germany) Karl Meiler (West Germany) Werner Zirngibl	(New Zealand) Onny Parun (Italy) Paolo Bertolucci	(United States) Michael Grant (Australia) Terry Rocavert (Austria) Hans Kary (Colombia) Jairo Velasco Sr.

Note: the Mizuno Open is not included the ATP database and it is unsure if it was eligible for ATP Rankings points. The four tournaments in Japan were also known as "Japan Satellite Circuit".

=== May ===
Week of	Tournament	Champions	Runners-up	Semifinalists	Quarterfinalists
May 5	Galatina Challenger; Galatina, Italy; Clay – $25,000 – 32S/16D; Singles draw – Doubles draw	(France) Gilles Moretton; 6–1, 3–6, 6–2	(Sweden) Stefan Simonsson	(West Germany) Werner Zirngibl (France) Dominique Bedel	(France) Christophe Freyss (Bolivia) Ramiro Benavides (Chile) Alejandro Pierola (Spain) Gabriel Urpí
May 5	Galatina Challenger; Galatina, Italy; Clay – $25,000 – 32S/16D; Singles draw – Doubles draw	(Australia) Syd Ball (Australia) Chris Kachel; 6–2, 6–1	(United States) Tim Garcia (United States) Michael Grant	(West Germany) Werner Zirngibl (France) Dominique Bedel	(France) Christophe Freyss (Bolivia) Ramiro Benavides (Chile) Alejandro Pierola (Spain) Gabriel Urpí
May 12	No tournaments scheduled.				
May 19	No tournaments scheduled.				
May 26	No tournaments scheduled.				

=== June ===
Week of	Tournament	Champions	Runners-up	Semifinalists	Quarterfinalists
June 2	Kent Championships; Beckenham, Great Britain; Grass – $25,000 – 64S/64D; Singles draw – Doubles draw	(New Zealand) Onny Parun; 6–4, 4–6, 9–7	(United States) Sandy Mayer	(Australia) Paul Kronk (Finland) Leo Palin	(United States) Tom Gorman (United States) Tony Graham (India) Anand Amritraj (India) Sashi Menon
June 2	Kent Championships; Beckenham, Great Britain; Grass – $25,000 – 64S/64D; Singles draw – Doubles draw	(United States) John Austin (United States) Van Winitsky; W/O	(Australia) Chris Johnstone (Australia) Greg Whitecross	(Australia) Paul Kronk (Finland) Leo Palin	(United States) Tom Gorman (United States) Tony Graham (India) Anand Amritraj (India) Sashi Menon
June 2	Cuneo Challenger; Cuneo, Italy; Clay – $25,000 – 32S/16D; Singles draw – Doubles draw	(Argentina) Ricardo Cano; 7–5, 6–2	(Bolivia) Mario Martinez	(Spain) Gabriel Urpí (France) Christophe Casa	(Argentina) Carlos Gattiker (West Germany) Werner Zirngibl (France) Dominique Bedel (Ecuador) Ricardo Ycaza
June 2	Cuneo Challenger; Cuneo, Italy; Clay – $25,000 – 32S/16D; Singles draw – Doubles draw	(Argentina) Ricardo Cano (Argentina) Carlos Gattiker; 4–6, 7–6, 6–2	(Bolivia) Mario Martinez (Chile) Pedro Rebolledo	(Spain) Gabriel Urpí (France) Christophe Casa	(Argentina) Carlos Gattiker (West Germany) Werner Zirngibl (France) Dominique Bedel (Ecuador) Ricardo Ycaza
June 9	No tournaments scheduled.				
June 16	No tournaments scheduled.				
June 23	No tournaments scheduled.				
June 2	Lugo Challenger; Lugo, Italy; Clay – $25,000 – 32S/16D; Singles draw – Doubles draw	(United States) Tony Giammalva; 6–3, 6–4, 6–4	(Argentina) Gustavo Guerrero	(Argentina) Fernando Dalla Fontana (Argentina) Ricardo Cano	(Argentina) Eduardo Bengoechea (France) Jean-François Caujolle (Brazil) Carlos Kirmayr (Italy) Gianni Ocleppo
June 2	Lugo Challenger; Lugo, Italy; Clay – $25,000 – 32S/16D; Singles draw – Doubles draw	(Australia) John Fitzgerald (Australia) Cliff Letcher; 6–1, 6–3	(Argentina) Ricardo Cano (Brazil) Carlos Kirmayr	(Argentina) Fernando Dalla Fontana (Argentina) Ricardo Cano	(Argentina) Eduardo Bengoechea (France) Jean-François Caujolle (Brazil) Carlos Kirmayr (Italy) Gianni Ocleppo

=== August ===
Week of	Tournament	Champions	Runners-up	Semifinalists	Quarterfinalists
August 4	Zell am See Challenger; Zell am See, Austria; Clay – $50,000 – 32S/16D; Singles draw – Doubles draw	(Australia) Peter McNamara; 6–4, 6–1, 7–5	(New Zealand) Chris Lewis	(Switzerland) Heinz Günthardt (France) Dominique Bedel	(Zimbabwe) Haroon Ismail (New Zealand) Onny Parun (Czechoslovakia) Pavel Složil (Australia) Wayne Hampson
August 4	Zell am See Challenger; Zell am See, Austria; Clay – $50,000 – 32S/16D; Singles draw – Doubles draw	(Czechoslovakia) Jiří Hřebec (Czechoslovakia) Pavel Hutka; 3–6, 7–5, 7–6, 6–2	(Australia) Wayne Pascoe (United States) Dave Siegler	(Switzerland) Heinz Günthardt (France) Dominique Bedel	(Zimbabwe) Haroon Ismail (New Zealand) Onny Parun (Czechoslovakia) Pavel Složil (Australia) Wayne Hampson
August 11	Royan Challenger; Royan, France; Clay – $25,000 – 32S/16D; Singles draw – Doubles draw	(France) Christophe Casa; 6–7, 6–4, 6–1, 6–0	(France) Dominique Bedel	(France) Bernard Fritz (Zimbabwe) Haroon Ismail	(United States) Dave Siegler (Australia) Wayne Hampson (Sweden) Jan Gunnarsson (Sweden) Stefan Svensson
August 11	Royan Challenger; Royan, France; Clay – $25,000 – 32S/16D; Singles draw – Doubles draw	(United States) Dave Siegler (South Africa) Robbie Venter; 6–4, 6–4	(Sweden) Jan Gunnarsson (Sweden) Stefan Svensson	(France) Bernard Fritz (Zimbabwe) Haroon Ismail	(United States) Dave Siegler (Australia) Wayne Hampson (Sweden) Jan Gunnarsson (Sweden) Stefan Svensson
August 18	Le Touquet Challenger; Le Touquet, France; Clay – $25,000 – 32S/16D; Singles draw – Doubles draw	(France) Christophe Casa; 6–4, 5–7, 6–4, 6–4, 6–2	(France) Jérôme Vanier	(France) Éric Deblicker (Spain) Ángel Giménez	(Sweden) Kjell Johansson (Spain) José López-Maeso (Sweden) Hans Simonsson (France) Hervé Gauvain
August 18	Le Touquet Challenger; Le Touquet, France; Clay – $25,000 – 32S/16D; Singles draw – Doubles draw	(United States) Dave Siegler (South Africa) Robbie Venter; 7–6, 4–6, 6–3	(Sweden) Hans Simonsson (Sweden) Tenny Svensson	(France) Éric Deblicker (Spain) Ángel Giménez	(Sweden) Kjell Johansson (Spain) José López-Maeso (Sweden) Hans Simonsson (France) Hervé Gauvain
August 18	Rio de Janeiro Open; Rio de Janeiro, Brazil; Clay – $25,000 – 48S/24D; Singles draw – Doubles draw	(Brazil) Carlos Kirmayr; 6–4, 6–0	(Argentina) Carlos Landó	(Brazil) Marcos Hocevar (United States) Charles Strode	(Argentina) Carlos Gattiker (Argentina) Eduardo Bengoechea (Argentina) Fernando Dalla Fontana (Argentina) Ricardo Cano
August 18	Rio de Janeiro Open; Rio de Janeiro, Brazil; Clay – $25,000 – 48S/24D; Singles draw – Doubles draw	(Argentina) Ricardo Cano (Brazil) Cássio Motta; 6–4, 6–4	(Argentina) Alejandro Ganzábal (Argentina) Gustavo Guerrero	(Brazil) Marcos Hocevar (United States) Charles Strode	(Argentina) Carlos Gattiker (Argentina) Eduardo Bengoechea (Argentina) Fernando Dalla Fontana (Argentina) Ricardo Cano
August 25	Brussels Challenger; Brussels, Belgium; Clay – $25,000 – 32S/16D; Singles draw – Doubles draw	(Sweden) Kjell Johansson; 6–3, 6–4	(France) Georges Goven	(South Africa) Eddie Edwards (Sri Lanka) Sivagnanam Suresh	(France) Christophe Freyss (Bolivia) Ramiro Benavides (Sweden) Hans Simonsson (Australia) Chris Johnstone
August 25	Brussels Challenger; Brussels, Belgium; Clay – $25,000 – 32S/16D; Singles draw – Doubles draw	(South Africa) Eddie Edwards (United States) Craig Edwards; 6–1, 6–2	(United States) Doug Adler (Australia) Chris Johnstone	(South Africa) Eddie Edwards (Sri Lanka) Sivagnanam Suresh	(France) Christophe Freyss (Bolivia) Ramiro Benavides (Sweden) Hans Simonsson (Australia) Chris Johnstone
August 25	Porto Alegre Challenger; Porto Alegre, Brazil; Clay – $25,000 – 48S/24D; Singles draw – Doubles draw	(Brazil) Thomaz Koch; 6–7, 6–2, 7–6, 7–5	(Brazil) Carlos Kirmayr	(Chile) Belus Prajoux (Argentina) Ricardo Cano	(Argentina) Gustavo Guerrero (Argentina) Alejandro Gattiker (Uruguay) José Luis Damiani (United States) Charles Strode
August 25	Porto Alegre Challenger; Porto Alegre, Brazil; Clay – $25,000 – 48S/24D; Singles draw – Doubles draw	(Venezuela) Jorge Andrew (Switzerland) Markus Günthardt; 6–3, 6–1	(Brazil) Paulo Cleto (Brazil) Carlos Kirmayr	(Chile) Belus Prajoux (Argentina) Ricardo Cano	(Argentina) Gustavo Guerrero (Argentina) Alejandro Gattiker (Uruguay) José Luis Damiani (United States) Charles Strode

=== September ===
Week of	Tournament	Champions	Runners-up	Semifinalists	Quarterfinalists
September 1	Curitiba Challenger; Curitiba, Brazil; Clay – $25,000 – 64S/32D; Singles draw – Doubles draw	(Argentina) Gustavo Guerrero; 7–6, 6–3	(Brazil) Marcos Hocevar	(United States) Charles Strode (Brazil) João Soares	(Brazil) Givaldo Barbosa (United States) Morris Strode (United States) Cary Stansbury (Uruguay) José Luis Damiani
September 1	Curitiba Challenger; Curitiba, Brazil; Clay – $25,000 – 64S/32D; Singles draw – Doubles draw	(Venezuela) Jorge Andrew (Switzerland) Markus Günthardt; 4–6, 6–3, 7–6	(United States) Kevin Harris (United States) Craig Wittus	(United States) Charles Strode (Brazil) João Soares	(Brazil) Givaldo Barbosa (United States) Morris Strode (United States) Cary Stansbury (Uruguay) José Luis Damiani
September 1	Turin Challenger; Turin, Italy; Clay – $25,000 – 32S/16D; Singles draw – Doubles draw	(South Africa) Robbie Venter; 6–2, 6–1	(Spain) Miguel Mir	(Italy) Maurizio Bonaiti (Chile) Alejandro Pierola	(France) Hervé Gauvain (Sweden) Kjell Johansson (South Africa) Frank Punčec (France) Patrick Proisy
September 1	Turin Challenger; Turin, Italy; Clay – $25,000 – 32S/16D; Singles draw – Doubles draw	(United States) Jai DiLouie (Australia) Wayne Hampson; 6–3, 6–4	(United States) Dave Siegler (South Africa) Robbie Venter	(Italy) Maurizio Bonaiti (Chile) Alejandro Pierola	(France) Hervé Gauvain (Sweden) Kjell Johansson (South Africa) Frank Punčec (France) Patrick Proisy
September 8	Campinas Challenger; Campinas, Brazil; Clay – $25,000 – 64S/32D; Singles draw – Doubles draw	(Argentina) Ricardo Cano; 6–3, 4–6, 6–2	(Uruguay) José Luis Damiani	(Argentina) Guillermo Aubone (Brazil) Ney Keller	(Argentina) Gustavo Guerrero (Brazil) Júlio Góes (Brazil) João Soares (Brazil) Marcos Hocevar
September 8	Campinas Challenger; Campinas, Brazil; Clay – $25,000 – 64S/32D; Singles draw – Doubles draw	(Brazil) Marcos Hocevar (Brazil) João Soares; 7–5, 6–1	(Brazil) Ney Keller (Brazil) Cássio Motta	(Argentina) Guillermo Aubone (Brazil) Ney Keller	(Argentina) Gustavo Guerrero (Brazil) Júlio Góes (Brazil) João Soares (Brazil) Marcos Hocevar
September 15	Cosenza Challenger; Cosenza, Italy; Clay – $25,000 – 32S/16D; Singles draw – Doubles draw	(Ecuador) Ricardo Ycaza; 6–1, 6–4	(Chile) Alejandro Pierola	(Uruguay) Diego Pérez (Bolivia) Ramiro Benavides	(United States) Chris Mayotte (Sweden) Anders Järryd (Socialist Federal Republic of Yugoslavia) Marko Ostoja (United States) Jai DiLouie
September 15	Cosenza Challenger; Cosenza, Italy; Clay – $25,000 – 32S/16D; Singles draw – Doubles draw	(Australia) Ernie Ewert (Australia) Brad Guan; 7–6, 6–3	(Egypt) Ismail El Shafei (Ecuador) Ricardo Ycaza	(Uruguay) Diego Pérez (Bolivia) Ramiro Benavides	(United States) Chris Mayotte (Sweden) Anders Järryd (Socialist Federal Republic of Yugoslavia) Marko Ostoja (United States) Jai DiLouie
September 22	International Tournament of Messina; Messina, Italy; Clay – $25,000 – 32S/16D; Singles draw – Doubles draw	(Sweden) Anders Järryd; 6–4, 5–7, 6–2	(United States) Chris Mayotte	(Italy) Ezio Di Matteo (Australia) Brad Guan	(Italy) Franco Merlone (Sweden) Stefan Svensson (Australia) Ernie Ewert (Italy) Massimo Grassotti
September 22	International Tournament of Messina; Messina, Italy; Clay – $25,000 – 32S/16D; Singles draw – Doubles draw	(Australia) Ernie Ewert (Australia) Brad Guan; 6–3, 6–4	(Italy) Gianni Marchetti (Italy) Enzo Vattuone	(Italy) Ezio Di Matteo (Australia) Brad Guan	(Italy) Franco Merlone (Sweden) Stefan Svensson (Australia) Ernie Ewert (Italy) Massimo Grassotti
September 29	Mexico City Challenger; Mexico City, Mexico; Hard – $25,000 – 32S/16D; Singles draw – Doubles draw	(Venezuela) Jorge Andrew; 6–3, 6–4	(United States) Scott McCain	(United States) John Hayes (Mexico) Emilio Montaño	(United States) Glen Holroyd (India) Anand Amritraj (United States) Ian Harris (Australia) Steve Docherty
September 29	Mexico City Challenger; Mexico City, Mexico; Hard – $25,000 – 32S/16D; Singles draw – Doubles draw	(United States) Scott McCain (United States) Larry Stefanki; 6–3, 6–3	(United States) Glen Holroyd (United States) Craig Wittus	(United States) John Hayes (Mexico) Emilio Montaño	(United States) Glen Holroyd (India) Anand Amritraj (United States) Ian Harris (Australia) Steve Docherty

=== December ===
Week of	Tournament	Champions	Runners-up	Semifinalists	Quarterfinalists
December 1	Buenos Aires Challenger; Buenos Aires, Argentina; Clay – $25,000 – 32S/16D; Singles draw – Doubles draw	(Argentina) Eduardo Bengoechea; 7–6, 6–2	(Argentina) Carlos Castellan	(Argentina) Ricardo Cano (Uruguay) Diego Pérez	(Argentina) Fernando Dalla Fontana (Argentina) Enrique Caviglia (Argentina) Gustavo Tiberti (United States) Charles Strode
December 1	Buenos Aires Challenger; Buenos Aires, Argentina; Clay – $25,000 – 32S/16D; Singles draw – Doubles draw	(Argentina) Ricardo Cano (Argentina) Roberto Carruthers; 6–2, 6–4	(Argentina) Carlos Gattiker (Argentina) Alejandro Gattiker	(Argentina) Ricardo Cano (Uruguay) Diego Pérez	(Argentina) Fernando Dalla Fontana (Argentina) Enrique Caviglia (Argentina) Gustavo Tiberti (United States) Charles Strode

== Statistical information ==
These tables present the number of singles (S) and doubles (D) titles won by each player and each nation during the season, within all the tournament categories of the 1980 ATP Challenger Series. The players/nations are sorted by: (1) total number of titles (a doubles title won by two players representing the same nation counts as only one win for the nation); (2) a singles > doubles hierarchy; (3) alphabetical order (by family names for players).

=== Titles won by player ===
Total	Player	S	D
5	Ricardo Cano (ARG)	2	3
3	Jorge Andrew (VEN)	1	2
3	Markus Günthardt (SUI)	1	2
3	Robbie Venter (RSA)	1	2
3	Syd Ball (AUS)	0	3
3	Cliff Letcher (AUS)	0	3
2	Christophe Casa (FRA)	2	0
2	Tony Graham (USA)	1	1
2	Chris Mayotte (USA)	1	1
2	Ernie Ewert (AUS)	0	2
2	Brad Guan (AUS)	0	2
2	Chris Kachel (AUS)	0	2
2	Dave Siegler (USA)	0	2
2	Larry Stefanki (USA)	0	2
1	Corrado Barazzutti (ITA)	1	0
1	Eduardo Bengoechea (ARG)	1	0
1	Tony Giammalva (USA)	1	0
1	Adolfo González (MEX)	1	0
1	Gustavo Guerrero (ARG)	1	0
1	Anders Järryd (SWE)	1	0
1	Kjell Johansson (SWE)	1	0
1	Carlos Kirmayr (BRA)	1	0
1	Thomaz Koch (BRA)	1	0
1	Peter McNamara (AUS)	1	0
1	Gilles Moretton (FRA)	1	0
1	Onny Parun (NZL)	1	0
1	Russel Simpson (NZL)	1	0
1	Greg Whitecross (AUS)	1	0
1	Ricardo Ycaza (ECU)	1	0
1	John Austin (USA)	0	1
1	Mike Barr (USA)	0	1
1	Roberto Carruthers (ARG)	0	1
1	Jai DiLouie (USA)	0	1
1	Klaus Eberhard (FRG)	0	1
1	Eddie Edwards (RSA)	0	1
1	Craig Edwards (USA)	0	1
1	John Fitzgerald (AUS)	0	1
1	Carlos Gattiker (ARG)	0	1
1	Réjean Génois (CAN)	0	1
1	Wayne Hampson (AUS)	0	1
1	Marcos Hocevar (BRA)	0	1
1	Jiří Hřebec (TCH)	0	1
1	Pavel Hutka (TCH)	0	1
1	John Marks (AUS)	0	1
1	Ulrich Marten (FRG)	0	1
1	Scott McCain (USA)	0	1
1	Cássio Motta (BRA)	0	1
1	Belus Prajoux (CHI)	0	1
1	João Soares (BRA)	0	1
1	Van Winitsky (USA)	0	1

=== Titles won by nation ===
Total	Nation	S	D
12	United States (USA)	3	9
10	Australia (AUS)	2	8
7	Argentina (ARG)	4	3
4	Brazil (BRA)	2	2
4	South Africa (RSA)	1	3
3	France (FRA)	3	0
3	Switzerland (SUI)	1	2
3	Venezuela (VEN)	1	2
2	New Zealand (NZL)	2	0
2	Sweden (SWE)	2	0
1	Ecuador (ECU)	1	0
1	Italy (ITA)	1	0
1	Mexico (MEX)	1	0
1	Canada (CAN)	0	1
1	Chile (CHI)	0	1
1	Czechoslovakia (TCH)	0	1
1	West Germany (FRG)	0	1

== See also ==
- 1980 Grand Prix
- Association of Tennis Professionals
- International Tennis Federation
