= 1981 French Open – Men's singles =

Men's singles
- 1981 French Open

Final
- Champion: (Sweden) Björn Borg
- Runner-up: (Czechoslovakia) Ivan Lendl
- Score: 6–1, 4–6, 6–2, 3–6, 6–1

Details
- Draw: 128
- Seeds: 16

Events
Singles	men	women		boys	girls
Doubles	men	women	mixed	boys	girls
WC Singles	men	women	quad
WC Doubles	men	women	quad
Legends	−45	45+	women
- French Open

Three-time defending champion Björn Borg defeated Ivan Lendl in the final, 6–1, 4–6, 6–2, 3–6, 6–1 to win the men's singles tennis title at the 1981 French Open. It was his sixth French Open title and his eleventh and last major title overall. The final was played on June 7, the day after Borg's 25th birthday. This marked Borg's last French Open appearance, as he was required to play qualifying the following year due to inactivity and elected not to do so; he retired from the sport shortly thereafter. Borg played in 8 Roland Garros tournaments and finished with a 49–2 record (both losses to Adriano Panatta), a 96.08% win rate.

== Seeds ==
The seeded players are listed below. Björn Borg is the champion; others show the round in which they were eliminated.

1. (Sweden) Björn Borg (champion)
2. (United States) Jimmy Connors (quarterfinals)
3. (United States) John McEnroe (quarterfinals)
4. (United States) Gene Mayer (third round)
5. (Czechoslovakia) Ivan Lendl (final)
6. (Argentina) Guillermo Vilas (fourth round)
7. (Argentina) José Luis Clerc (semifinals)
8. (United States) Harold Solomon (first round)
9. (United States) Vitas Gerulaitis (first round)
10. (United States) Eliot Teltscher (first round)
11. (France) Yannick Noah (quarterfinals)
12. (United States) Brian Gottfried (third round)
13. (Australia) Peter McNamara (fourth round)
14. (Poland) Wojtek Fibak (fourth round)
15. (Hungary) Balázs Taróczy (quarterfinals)
16. (United States) Eddie Dibbs (third round)

== Draw ==
Key

- Q = Qualifier
- WC = Wild card
- LL = Lucky loser
- Alt = Alternate
- ITF = ITF entry
- PR = Protected ranking
- SR = Special ranking
- SE = Special exempt
- JE = Junior exempt
- JR = Junior Accelerator Programme entrant
- CO = College Accelerator Programme entrant
- NG = Next Gen Accelerator Program entrant
- w/o = Walkover
- r = Retired
- d = Defaulted

=== Finals ===
Quarterfinals
1	(Sweden) Björn Borg	6	6	6
15	(Hungary) Balázs Taróczy	3	3	2
(Paraguay) Víctor Pecci	3	6	6	6
11	(France) Yannick Noah	6	4	4	4
5	(Czechoslovakia) Ivan Lendl	6	6	7
3	(United States) John McEnroe	4	4	5
7	(Argentina) José Luis Clerc	4	6	4	7	6
2	(United States) Jimmy Connors	6	2	6	5	0

Semifinals
1	(Sweden) Björn Borg	6	6	7
(Paraguay) Víctor Pecci	4	4	5
5	(Czechoslovakia) Ivan Lendl	3	6	4	7	6
7	(Argentina) José Luis Clerc	6	4	6	6	2

Final
1	(Sweden) Björn Borg	6	4	6	3	6
5	(Czechoslovakia) Ivan Lendl	1	6	2	6	1

=== Top half ===
==== Section 1 ====
First round
1	(Sweden) B Borg	6	6	6
(Spain) J López-Maeso	2	2	2
(West Germany) W Popp	3	6	3	6
Q	(Brazil) C Motta	6	3	6	7
(Bolivia) M Martinez	4	5	2
(Spain) A Giménez	6	7	6
(Australia) P McNamee	1	7	6	0	5
Q	(France) P Torre	6	6	3	6	7
(United States) T Moor	6	6	6
(Sweden) A Järryd	2	4	2
(Uruguay) J L Damiani	6
(West Germany) R Gehring	2	r
(Australia) P Kronk	1	3	1
(France) P Proisy	6	6	6
(Romania) I Năstase	6	6	7
10	(United States) E Teltscher	2	4	5

Second round
1	(Sweden) B Borg	6	7	6
Q	(Brazil) C Motta	1	5	0
(Spain) A Giménez	3	4	3
Q	(France) P Torre	6	6	6
(United States) T Moor	6	7	6
(Uruguay) J L Damiani	3	6	1
(France) P Proisy	1	2	0
(Romania) I Năstase	6	6	6

Third round
1	(Sweden) B Borg	6	6	6
Q	(France) P Torre	2	1	2
(United States) T Moor	6	6	6
(Romania) I Năstase	3	2	1

Fourth round
1	(Sweden) B Borg	6	6	6
(United States) T Moor	0	0	1

==== Section 2 ====
First round
15	(Hungary) B Taróczy	6	6	6
(United States) H Pfister	3	0	1
(Czechoslovakia) T Šmid	6	7	6
(Socialist Federal Republic of Yugoslavia) Z Franulović	1	6	2
(Brazil) M Hocevar	2	6	6	6
(Colombia) J Restrepo	6	4	2	3
(Czechoslovakia) P Hutka	4	1	6	4
Q	(United States) B Testerman	6	6	4	6
(United States) F Taygan	1	6	4	1
(United States) T Giammalva	6	3	6	6
(Italy) T Zugarelli	3	1	0
(Spain) R Vizcaíno	6	6	6
(Spain) J Higueras	3	0	3
(France) T Tulasne	6	6	6
(Italy) A Panatta	6	7	6
8	(United States) H Solomon	3	5	2

Second round
15	(Hungary) B Taróczy	7	7	7
(Czechoslovakia) T Šmid	6	5	6
(Brazil) M Hocevar	4	3	6	6	2
Q	(United States) B Testerman	6	6	3	0	6
(United States) T Giammalva	6	7	6
(Spain) R Vizcaíno	4	5	4
(France) T Tulasne	6	4	6	6
(Italy) A Panatta	4	6	3	0

Third round
15	(Hungary) B Taróczy	6	5
Q	(United States) B Testerman	1	2	r
(United States) T Giammalva	4	0	3
(France) T Tulasne	6	6	6

Fourth round
15	(Hungary) B Taróczy	7	6	5	6
(France) T Tulasne	5	3	7	3

==== Section 3 ====
First round
4	(United States) G Mayer	6	6	6
(France) D Bedel	1	4	3
(South Africa) R Moore	7	3	4	6	9
(France) P Dominguez	5	6	6	3	7
(Israel) S Glickstein	7	6	6
(United States) R Meyer	5	3	0
(Paraguay) V Pecci	6	7	6
(Italy) V Magnelli	2	5	1
(Zimbabwe) H Ismail	4	6	6	6
(Paraguay) F González	6	3	2	2
Q	(Peru) F Maynetto	2	6	4
(France) E Deblicker	6	7	6
(Netherlands) L Sanders	2	6	2	4
(Spain) F Luna	6	4	6	6
Q	(United States) B Nichols	2	2	4
14	(Poland) W Fibak	6	6	6

Second round
4	(United States) G Mayer	6	6	6
(South Africa) R Moore	4	2	1
(Israel) S Glickstein	6	3	5	5
(Paraguay) V Pecci	4	6	7	7
(Zimbabwe) H Ismail	2	6	5	6	6
(France) E Deblicker	6	3	7	2	4
(Spain) F Luna	6	0	6
14	(Poland) W Fibak	7	6	7

Third round
4	(United States) G Mayer	4	1	r
(Paraguay) V Pecci	6	2
(Zimbabwe) H Ismail	6	2	3	2
14	(Poland) W Fibak	4	6	6	6

Fourth round
(Paraguay) V Pecci	6	6	6
14	(Poland) W Fibak	2	3	3

==== Section 4 ====
First round
11	(France) Y Noah	6	6	6
(India) R Krishnan	1	1	4
(Chile) H Gildemeister	6	2	6	6	12
(France) C Freyss	7	6	3	0	10
(West Germany) K Eberhard	1	4	7	3
(Sweden) J Norbäck	6	6	5	6
(Argentina) G Guerrero	6	2	3	4
(Australia) R Frawley	4	6	6	6
(United States) R Fagel	3	0	0
(United States) T Waltke	6	6	6
(Australia) D Carter	6	3	4	2
(Argentina) R Cano	3	6	6	6
(Australia) R Case	3	1	2
(France) P Portes	6	6	6
(Italy) P Bertolucci	2	5	2
6	(Argentina) G Vilas	6	7	6

Second round
11	(France) Y Noah	7	1	6	6
(Chile) H Gildemeister	6	6	4	3
(Sweden) J Norbäck	7	2	6	6
(Australia) R Frawley	6	6	4	3
(United States) T Waltke	4	4	7	2
(Argentina) R Cano	6	6	6	6
(France) P Portes	2	3	0
6	(Argentina) G Vilas	6	6	6

Third round
11	(France) Y Noah	6	3	6	6
(Sweden) J Norbäck	0	6	1	4
(Argentina) R Cano	1	1	0
6	(Argentina) G Vilas	6	6	6

Fourth round
11	(France) Y Noah	6	6	5	6
6	(Argentina) G Vilas	2	3	7	4

=== Bottom half ===
==== Section 5 ====
First round
5	(Czechoslovakia) I Lendl	7	7	6
(Australia) J Fitzgerald	5	6	4
(South Africa) E Edwards	6	2	3	6	3
(Ecuador) A Gómez	4	6	6	1	6
(Argentina) E Bengoechea	6	6	3	6
(France) H Leconte	4	1	6	4
(United States) C Wittus	7	3	5	3
(United States) C Mayotte	6	6	7	6
(Austria) P Feigl	7	5	2	3
(United States) E Fromm	6	7	6	6
(United States) B Martin	4	7	7	6
(Spain) M Mir	6	6	6	3
(France) D Naegelen	3	6	0
(France) G Moretton	6	7	6
(France) G Goven	3	1	7	1
13	(Australia) P McNamara	6	6	5	6

Second round
5	(Czechoslovakia) I Lendl	6	3	2	7	6
(Ecuador) A Gómez	2	6	6	6	4
(Argentina) E Bengoechea	6	6	6
(United States) C Mayotte	4	0	4
(United States) E Fromm	6	2	0	5
(United States) B Martin	3	6	6	7
(France) G Moretton	3	3	3
13	(Australia) P McNamara	6	6	6

Third round
5	(Czechoslovakia) I Lendl	6	6	4	6
(Argentina) E Bengoechea	2	1	6	3
(United States) B Martin	0	2	1
13	(Australia) P McNamara	6	6	6

Fourth round
5	(Czechoslovakia) I Lendl	6	4	7	7
13	(Australia) P McNamara	2	6	6	6

==== Section 6 ====
First round
9	(United States) V Gerulaitis	6	2	5	5
(Ecuador) R Ycaza	4	6	7	7
PR	(Argentina) C Gattiker	4	6	6
(United States) J Arias	6	7	7
(Australia) C Johnstone	6	7	6
(United States) L Stefanki	1	5	0
(New Zealand) O Parun	4	4	4
(Sweden) P Hjertquist	6	6	6
PR	(Uruguay) D Pérez	6	6	6
(Czechoslovakia) J Kodeš	2	1	4
(United States) R Van't Hof	4	6	0	1
(Czechoslovakia) J Hřebec	6	3	6	6
(Chile) J Fillol Sr.	3	6	5	7	6
(Italy) C Barazzutti	6	3	7	5	4
(United States) V Van Patten	2	0	4
3	(United States) J McEnroe	6	6	6

Second round
(Ecuador) R Ycaza	5	6	1	6	6
(United States) J Arias	7	3	6	1	4
(Australia) C Johnstone	4	5	6
(Sweden) P Hjertquist	6	7	7
PR	(Uruguay) D Pérez	7	6	2	6
(Czechoslovakia) J Hřebec	6	4	6	2
(Chile) J Fillol Sr.	3	0	2
3	(United States) J McEnroe	6	6	6

Third round
(Ecuador) R Ycaza	6	0	7	6
(Sweden) P Hjertquist	4	6	6	2
PR	(Uruguay) D Pérez	1	6	0	4
3	(United States) J McEnroe	6	2	6	6

Fourth round
(Ecuador) R Ycaza	3	4	4
3	(United States) J McEnroe	6	6	6

==== Section 7 ====
First round
7	(Argentina) J L Clerc	7	7	6
(Switzerland) H Günthardt	5	5	1
(Chile) A Fillol	6	6	3	6
(Argentina) F Dalla Fontana	1	3	6	4
(Sweden) J Nyström	6	6	3	6
(United States) S Krulevitz	2	7	6	7
(Spain) M Orantes	6	4	2
Q	(Argentina) A Ganzábal	7	6	6
(Mexico) R Ramírez	3	6	2
(Brazil) C Kirmayr	6	7	6
(Czechoslovakia) P Složil	6	3	6	6
(Italy) G Rinaldini	2	6	2	3
(France) J Potier	1	7	4	2
(Sweden) H Simonsson	6	5	6	6
(Argentina) G Aubone	7	3	0	4
12	(United States) B Gottfried	6	6	6	6

Second round
7	(Argentina) J L Clerc	6	6	6
(Chile) A Fillol	4	1	0
(United States) S Krulevitz	3	7	1	3
Q	(Argentina) A Ganzábal	6	6	6	6
(Brazil) C Kirmayr	6	6	6
(Czechoslovakia) P Složil	4	4	4
(Sweden) H Simonsson	2	3	6
12	(United States) B Gottfried	6	6	7

Third round
7	(Argentina) J L Clerc	6	6	6
Q	(Argentina) A Ganzábal	4	2	1
(Brazil) C Kirmayr	6	6	6
12	(United States) B Gottfried	2	4	2

Fourth round
7	(Argentina) J L Clerc	6	3	7	7
(Brazil) C Kirmayr	4	6	5	5

==== Section 8 ====
First round
16	(United States) E Dibbs	6	6	6
(United States) B Manson	0	1	1
(New Zealand) C Lewis	6	6	4	2	6
(Australia) M Edmondson	4	2	6	6	4
(France) J-L Haillet	6	5	4	6
PR	(Iran) M Bahrami	4	7	6	7
(United States) M Purcell	3	4	6	6	6
(West Germany) A Maurer	6	6	1	3	1
(United States) B McKown	3	3	3
(France) J-F Caujolle	6	6	6
(South Africa) D Schneider	4	6	4	2
(France) P Kuchna	6	3	6	6
(Spain) G Urpí	7	4	6	6
(France) C Casa	5	6	4	0
(France) C Roger-Vasselin	1	5	6	3
2	(United States) J Connors	6	7	3	6

Second round
16	(United States) E Dibbs	6	6	4	6
(New Zealand) C Lewis	3	2	6	4
PR	(Iran) M Bahrami	1	1	6	3
(United States) M Purcell	6	6	3	6
(France) J-F Caujolle	3	3	7	7	6
(France) P Kuchna	6	6	6	5	3
(Spain) G Urpí	3	6	4
2	(United States) J Connors	6	7	6

Third round
16	(United States) E Dibbs	6	6	4	2	3
(United States) M Purcell	3	2	6	6	6
(France) J-F Caujolle	0	2	0
2	(United States) J Connors	6	6	6

Fourth round
(United States) M Purcell	2	4	6
2	(United States) J Connors	6	6	7

Preceded by 1980 Australian Open	Grand Slam men's singles	Succeeded by 1981 Wimbledon Championships
