= Buenos Aires Challenger =

Tennis tournament held in Buenos Aires, Argentina

The Buenos Aires Challenger was a tennis tournament held in Buenos Aires, Argentina. The event was part of the ATP Challenger Tour and it was played on outdoor clay courts, in Buenos Aires Lawn Tennis Club.

== Finals ==
=== Singles ===
Year	Champions	Runners-up	Score
2001	(Argentina) Agustín Calleri	(Argentina) David Nalbandian	3–6, 6–1, 6–3
2000	(Argentina) Guillermo Coria	(Spain) Alberto Berasategui	6–1, 4–6, 6–4
1999	(Argentina) Franco Squillari	(Argentina) Hernán Gumy	5–7, 6–1, 6–4
1998	(Morocco) Younes El Aynaoui	(Spain) Alberto Martín	7–6, 6–1
1997	(Argentina) Franco Squillari	(Argentina) Diego Moyano	6–1, 6–4
1992	(Spain) Juan Gisbert	(Germany) Carsten Arriens	6–1, 7–6
1980	(Argentina) Eduardo Bengoechea	(Argentina) Carlos Castellan	7–6, 6–2

=== Doubles ===
Year	Champions	Runners-up	Score
2001	(Argentina) Federico Browne (Argentina) Ignacio Hirigoyen	(Argentina) Gastón Etlis (Argentina) Martín Rodríguez	6–4, 7–6
2000	(Argentina) Pablo Albano (Argentina) Lucas Arnold Ker	(Argentina) Sergio Roitman (Argentina) Andrés Schneiter	6–3, 4–6, 6–2
1999	(Argentina) Guillermo Cañas (Argentina) Martín García	(South Africa) Paul Rosner (Serbia and Montenegro) Dušan Vemić	6–4, 6–4
1998	(Argentina) Guillermo Cañas (Argentina) Martín García	(Spain) Alberto Martín (Spain) Salvador Navarro	2–6, 6–3, 7–5
1997	(Argentina) Diego del Río (Argentina) Daniel Orsanic	(Argentina) Pablo Albano (Argentina) Luis Lobo	6–4, 4–6, 6–1
1992	(Argentina) Pablo Albano (Argentina) Javier Frana	(Argentina) Horacio de la Peña (Argentina) Gabriel Markus	2–6, 6–3, 6–4
1980	(Argentina) Ricardo Cano (Argentina) Roberto Carruthers	(Argentina) Carlos Gattiker (Argentina) Alejandro Gattiker	6–2, 6–4
