= 1977 ATP Buenos Aires (April) – Singles =

Guillermo Vilas defeated Wojtek Fibak 6–4, 6–3, 6–0 to win the April 1977 ATP Buenos Aires singles competition. Vilas was the defending champion.

== Seeds ==
A champion seed is indicated in bold text while text in italics indicates the round in which that seed was eliminated.

1. (Argentina) Guillermo Vilas **(Champion)**
2. (Poland) Wojciech Fibak (Final)

== Draw ==
=== Key ===
- NB: All rounds up to but not including the final were the best of 3 sets. The final was the best of 5 sets.

=== Final ===
| Final |
| 1 | (Argentina) **Guillermo Vilas** | **6** | **6** | **6** |
| 2 | (Poland) Wojciech Fibak | 4 | 3 | 0 |

=== Section 1 ===
First Round
1 | (Argentina) **Guillermo Vilas** | **6** | **6**
(Argentina) Roberto Gratz | 1 | 3
(Argentina) **Fernando Dalla Fontana** | **6** | **6**
(Argentina) Julián Ganzábal | 0 | 0
(Italy) **Paolo Bertolucci** | **6** | **7**
(Portugal) Jose Santiago | 4 | 5
(Romania) **Ion Țiriac** | **6** | **6**
(Argentina) Lorenzo Soriano | 3 | 2

Quarterfinals
1 | (Argentina) **Guillermo Vilas** | **6** | **6**
(Argentina) Fernando Dalla Fontana | 2 | 4
(Italy) **Paolo Bertolucci** | **6** | **9**
(Romania) Ion Țiriac | 3 | 7

Semifinals
1 | (Argentina) **Guillermo Vilas** | **6** | **6**
(Italy) Paolo Bertolucci | 3 | 2

=== Section 2 ===
First Round
(Argentina) **Ricardo Cano** | 3 | **6** | **6**
(Argentina) Lito Álvarez | **6** | 2 | 2
(Hungary) **Balázs Taróczy** | **6** | **6**
(Argentina) Roberto Aubone | 4 | 2
(United States) **Cliff Richey** | **6** | **6**
(Argentina) Carlos Landó | 1 | 2
Hector Romani | 3 | 3
(Poland) **Wojciech Fibak** | **6** | **6**

Quarterfinals
(Argentina) **Ricardo Cano** | **6** | **6**
(Hungary) Balázs Taróczy | 3 | 3
(United States) Cliff Richey | 7 | 3
2 | (Poland) **Wojciech Fibak** | **9** | **6**

Semifinals
(Argentina) Ricardo Cano | 3 | 7
2 | (Poland) **Wojciech Fibak** | **6** | **9**
