= Patrizio Parrini =

Italian tennis player

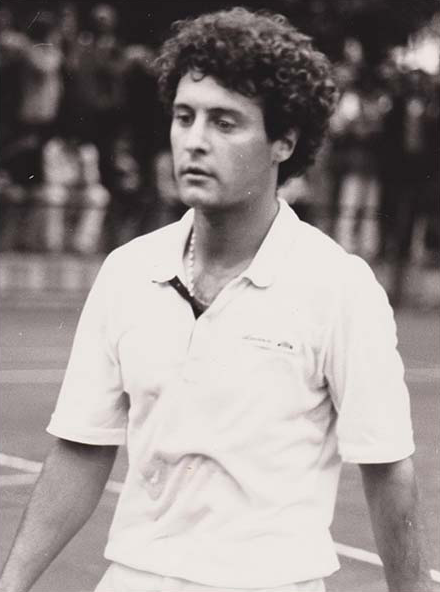
- Patrizio parrini
- Country (sports): Italy
- Born: 5 September 1959 (age 65)
- Plays: Right-handed

Singles
- Career record: 0–8
- Career titles: 0
- Highest ranking: No. 300 (4 January 1982)

Grand Slam singles results
- French Open: 1R (1982)

Doubles
- Career record: 4–14
- Career titles: 0
- Highest ranking: No. 266 (16 July 1984)

Patrizio Parrini (born 5 September 1959) is a former professional tennis player from Italy.

== Career ==
Parrini was a doubles semi-finalist, with partner Gianluca Rinaldini, at the Alitalia Open in 1981.

He played Spaniard Gabriel Urpí in the first round of the 1982 French Open and was defeated in four sets. In his seven other appearances on the Grand Prix tennis circuit, he was also unable to register a win.

He retired from the professional tour in 1987, at 28.

== Challenger titles ==
=== Doubles: (2) ===
No.	Year	Tournament	Surface	Partner	Opponents	Score
1.	1981	Galatina, Italy	Clay	(Argentina) Carlos Gattiker	(Argentina) Roberto Carruthers (Argentina) Fernando Dalla Fontana	6–4, 5–7, 7–5
2.	1985	Parioli, Italy	Clay	(Switzerland) Claudio Mezzadri	(Italy) Paolo Canè (Italy) Simone Colombo	6–4, 3–6, 6–4
