= Guillermo Aubone =

Argentine tennis player (born 1954)

- Country (sports): Argentina
- Born: 8 June 1954 (age 71) Buenos Aires, Argentina
- Turned pro: 1974
- Plays: Left-handed

Singles
- Career record: 11–33
- Career titles: 0
- Highest ranking: No. 133 (22 December 1980)

Grand Slam singles results
- French Open: 1R (1981, 1982)
- US Open: 1R (1980)

Doubles
- Career record: 21-32
- Career titles: 0
- Highest ranking: No. 175 (3 January 1983)

Grand Slam doubles results
- French Open: 1R (1980, 1981, 1982)

Mixed doubles

Grand Slam mixed doubles results
- French Open: 1R (1978, 1982)

Guillermo "Willie" Aubone (born 8 June 1954) is a former professional tennis player from Argentina.

== Playing career ==
Before turning pro, Aubone played college tennis in the United States, at the University of Corpus Christi and University of South Carolina.

He had to face seeded players in the first round of all three of his Grand Slam singles appearances. At the 1980 US Open he faced world number one Björn Borg, then played against 12th seed Brian Gottfried in the 1981 French Open, before coming up against 16th seed Mel Purcell in the 1982 French Open. He lost each of those matches.

On the singles circuit, Aubone made one quarter-final, which at the British Hard Court Championships in 1981.

He had more success as a doubles player. In 1981 he reached four doubles semi-finals, partnering Wolfgang Popp in Bournemouth, Alejandro Pierola in Bordeaux, Billy Martin in Madrid and Andreas Maurer in Quito. The following year, at Vina Del Mar, he finally made it to a Grand Prix final, but he and partner Ángel Giménez were defaulted.

== Coaching ==
Since 1983 he has been coaching in Miami, where he had his own tennis academy. He coached Mary Joe Fernández during her early professional career and spent time at the Nick Bollettieri Tennis Academy, as an instructor.

== Grand Prix career finals ==
=== Doubles: 1 (0–1) ===
Result	W/L	Date	Tournament	Surface	Partner	Opponents	Score
Loss	0–1	Jan 1982	Viña Del Mar, Chile	Clay	(Spain) Ángel Giménez	(Spain) Manuel Orantes (Mexico) Raúl Ramírez	DEF

== Challenger titles ==
=== Doubles: (1) ===
No.	Year	Tournament	Surface	Partner	Opponents	Score
1.	1981	Cuneo, Italy	Clay	(Argentina) Ricardo Cano	(Chile) Ricardo Acuña (Bolivia) Ramiro Benavides	7–6, 7–5
