= Junie Chatman =

American tennis player

- Full name: Junius Chatman, Jr
- Country (sports): United States
- Born: March 29, 1956 (age 70) Richmond, Virginia, U.S.

Singles
- Career record: 2–7
- Highest ranking: No. 219 (Jan 3, 1983)

Doubles
- Career record: 5–9
- Highest ranking: No. 272 (Jan 2, 1984)

Junius Chatman, Jr (born March 29, 1956) is an American former professional tennis player.

Born and raised in Richmond, Virginia, Chatman was the first African American to receive a tennis scholarship to the University of North Carolina. He won four Atlantic Coast Conference (ACC) championships, three in singles and one in doubles, before graduating in 1978.

Chatman reached a best singles ranking of 219 on the professional tour. In 1982 he made the round of 16 of Grand Prix tournaments at Stuttgart and Hilversum, as well as securing a doubles win over Jimmy Connors (and Mel Purcell) at Rotterdam. He won three doubles titles on the ATP Challenger circuit.

== ATP Challenger finals ==
=== Doubles: 4 (3–1) ===
Result	W–L	Date	Tournament	Surface	Partner	Opponents	Score
Win	1–0	Mar 1981	Kaduna, Nigeria	Clay	(United States) Mark Vines	(United States) Ian Harris (United States) Craig Wittus	6–1, 6–2
Win	2–0	Mar 1981	Barcelona, Spain	Clay	(Socialist Federal Republic of Yugoslavia) Marko Ostoja	(Paraguay) Francisco González (Canada) Derek Segal	6–4, 7–5
Loss	2–1	Aug 1981	Reus, Spain	Clay	(New Zealand) Bruce Derlin	(United States) Egan Adams (South Africa) Robbie Venter	7–6, 4–6, 4–6
Win	3–1	Jul 1983	Santos, Brazil	Clay	(Finland) Leo Palin	(Brazil) Edvaldo Oliveira (Brazil) Fernando Roese	7–6, 6–2
