= Vittorio Magnelli =

Italian tennis player

- Country (sports): Italy
- Born: 4 September 1957 (age 67)
- Plays: Right-handed

Singles
- Career record: 0–4
- Career titles: 0
- Highest ranking: No. 280 (4 January 1982)

Grand Slam singles results
- French Open: 1R (1981)

Doubles
- Career record: 0–3
- Career titles: 0
- Highest ranking: No. 409 (3 January 1983)

Vittorio Magnelli (born 4 September 1957) is a former professional tennis player from Italy.

== Career ==
Magnelli took part in the main draw of the 1981 French Open and faced Paraguayan Víctor Pecci in the first round. Pecci won the match in straight sets.

He is now a tennis coach and was working with Gréta Arn when she won the 2011 ASB Classic. Formerly, he was coach of Sandrine Testud, whom he married in 1998.
