= Werner Zirngibl =

German tennis player (born 1956)

- Full name: Werner Zirngibl
- Country (sports): West Germany
- Born: 4 September 1956 (age 69) Bonn, West Germany
- Plays: Right-handed

Singles
- Career record: 43–70
- Career titles: 1
- Highest ranking: No. 97 (7 November 1976)

Grand Slam singles results
- Australian Open: 2R (1977)
- French Open: 2R (1979)

Doubles
- Career record: 22–55
- Career titles: 0

Grand Slam doubles results
- Australian Open: 2R (1975)

Werner Zirngibl (born 4 September 1956) is a former professional tennis player from Germany.

== Biography ==
A right-handed player, Zirngibl won his first Grand Slam match at the January edition of the 1977 Australian Open, then had to retire during his second round match against Dick Crealy.

He managed to win the Belgium International Tennis Championships in 1978 as a qualifier. Following an upset win against top seed Adriano Panatta in the semi-finals, he had a four-set win over Ricardo Cano in the final. The tournament, held on outdoor clay courts in Brussels, was part of the Grand Prix tennis circuit. This was the first occasion a qualifier had gone on to win a Grand Prix tournament.

In 1979 he represented West Germany in a Davis Cup tie at home in Augsburg against Israel. His only appearance was in the doubles with Ulrich Pinner, which they won over the Israeli pairing of Shlomo Glickstein and Meir Wertheimer.

At the 1979 French Open he equalled his best performance at a Grand Slam when he made it to the second round.

Zirngibl studied medicine during his tennis career and became an orthopaedic surgeon. He was also a model. Based in Munich, he has performed surgery on top players including Michael Stich and Ivan Lendl.

== Grand Prix career finals ==
=== Singles: 1 (1–0) ===
Result	W–L	Year	Tournament	Surface	Opponent	Score
Win	1–0	1978	Brussels, Belgium	Clay	(Argentina) Ricardo Cano	1–6, 6–3, 6–4, 6–3

== Challenger titles ==
=== Singles: (2) ===
Result	No.	Year	Tournament	Surface	Opponent	Score
Win	1.	1981	Berlin, West Germany	Clay	(United States) Erick Iskersky	6–3, 7–6
Win	2.	1981	Galatina, Italy	Clay	(Sweden) Hans Simonsson	7–6, 7–5

== See also ==
- List of Germany Davis Cup team representatives
