= Thomas Stålhandske =

Argentine tennis player

- Country (sports): Argentina
- Born: 2 October 1961 (age 64) Buenos Aires, Argentina
- Height: 6 ft 3 in (191 cm)
- Plays: Right-handed
- Prize money: $18,528

Singles
- Career record: 2–2
- Highest ranking: No. 255 (3 Jan 1983)

Doubles
- Career record: 0–9
- Highest ranking: No. 227 (9 Jul 1984)

Thomas Stålhandske (born 2 October 1961) is an Argentine former professional tennis player.

Born in Buenos Aires, Stålhandske turned professional in 1980 and made regular appearances on the ATP Challenger Tour as well as in occasional Grand Prix tournaments. He had a best singles world ranking of 255 and made two Challenger semi-finals. At Grand Prix level he made the second round at Itaparica in 1983 and Kitzbuhel in 1984.
