= Gianluca Rinaldini =

Italian tennis player

- Country (sports): Italy
- Born: 10 August 1959 (age 65); Faenza, Italy
- Plays: Right-handed

Singles
- Career record: 9–26
- Career titles: 0
- Highest ranking: No. 94 (4 Oct 1982)

Grand Slam singles results
- French Open: 1R (1981, 1983)
- Wimbledon: 1R (1981)

Doubles
- Career record: 2–13
- Career titles: 0
- Highest ranking: No. 259 (3 Jan 1983)

Grand Slam doubles results
- French Open: 1R (1983)

Gianluca Rinaldini (born 10 August 1959) is a former professional tennis player from Italy.

== Career ==
In 1981, Rinaldini appeared in the French Open and Wimbledon Championships but was beaten in the opening round at both events, by Pavel Složil and Tim Gullikson respectively.

Rinaldini had wins over Alejandro Gattiker, Georges Goven and Sergio Casal en route to the semi-finals of the 1982 Florence Open, where he was beaten by eventual champion Vitas Gerulaitis.

The Italian played in both the men's singles and men's doubles draws at the 1983 French Open. In the singles, he was defeated in the first round by Australian John Alexander and he was also unable to progress into the second round in the doubles, with partner Claudio Panatta.

== Accident ==
On 28 September 1985, Rinaldini was seriously injured in a car accident near his hometown of Faenza, caused by an exploding tyre. His car crashed into a guardrail and he suffered a cracked vertebrae. The accident left him with paralysis and he has been using a wheelchair ever since.

== Personal ==
He is the father of Mattia Rinaldini, a footballer who played mostly for A.S. Varese and A.C. Prato.

== Challenger titles ==
=== Singles: (1) ===
No.	Year	Tournament	Surface	Opponent	Score
1.	1981	Kaduna, Nigeria	Clay	(Austria) Gerald Mild	6–3, 6–4
