= Miroslav Lacek =

Czech tennis player (born 1959)

- Country (sports): Czechoslovakia
- Born: 16 April 1959 (age 66); Kadaň, Czechoslovakia
- Height: 5 ft 9 in (175 cm)
- Plays: Left-handed

Singles
- Career record: 0–4
- Highest ranking: No. 170 (6 Aug 1984)

Doubles
- Career record: 1–2
- Highest ranking: No. 374 (29 Oct 1984)
Medal record
Friendship Games
Bronze medal – third place	1984 Katowice	Men's doubles

Miroslav Lacek (born 16 April 1959) is a Czech former professional tennis player.

Lacek was born in Kadaň, a town in modern day Czech Republic, where his father Jiří worked as a physical education teacher and was instrumental in the establishment of the Kadaň Tennis Association.

As a junior, Lacek represented the Czechoslovakia national team alongside Ivan Lendl, including at a youth World Cup event in Caracas and the 1979 Galea Cup in Vichy, finishing second in the latter.

In the 1980s he competed on the professional tour and reached a career high singles ranking of 170 in the world, with runner-up finishes in two ATP Challenger Tour tournaments. He made the occasional Grand Prix main draw appearance and was a bronze medalist in doubles at the Friendship Games in 1984.
