= Carlos Gattiker =

Argentine tennis player

- Country (sports): Argentina
- Born: 6 June 1956; Buenos Aires, Argentina
- Died: 19 May 2010 (aged 53)
- Height: 1.75 m (5 ft 9 in)
- Plays: Right-handed
- Prize money: $121,831

Singles
- Career record: 2–25
- Career titles: 0
- Highest ranking: No. 89 (26 Dec 1979)

Grand Slam singles results
- French Open: 1R (1980, 1981, 1983)
- Wimbledon: 1R (1980)

Doubles
- Career record: 23–40
- Career titles: 0
- Highest ranking: No. 110 (9 Jul 1984)

Grand Slam doubles results
- French Open: 1R (1980, 1981, 1984)
- Wimbledon: 1R (1980)
- US Open: 1R (1979)

Carlos Gattiker (6 June 1956 – 19 May 2010) was a professional tennis player from Argentina.

== Career ==
Gattiker made four Grand Prix doubles semi-finals during his career, at Buenos Aires in 1977, Indianapolis in 1980, Kitzbuhel in 1981 and Bahia in 1983. His partner in Kitzbuhel was his brother Alejandro Gattiker.

He also partnered his brother at Grand Slam level. One of their three Grand Slam appearances together was at the 1980 Wimbledon Championships, where they lost a five-set match to another pair of brothers, John and Tony Lloyd. Gattiker played in five further Grand Slam tournaments, as either a singles of doubles player, but was never able to progress past the first round.

The Argentinian represented his country in a 1980 Davis Cup tie against the United States. He and Ricardo Cano took part in the doubles rubber, which they lost to Peter Fleming and John McEnroe.

== Post-retirement ==
After retiring, Gattiker turned to coaching. Gattiker worked mostly with players from Argentina, including Pablo Albano and Luis Lobo, but also coached Morocco's Karim Alami. He died in 2010 of amyotrophic lateral sclerosis, which he had been suffering for 12 years.

== Challenger titles ==
=== Singles: (1) ===
No.	Year	Tournament	Surface	Opponent	Score
1.	1979	Ribeirão Preto, Brazil	Clay	(Brazil) Carlos Kirmayr	6–4, 2–6, 6–2

=== Doubles: (5) ===
No.	Year	Tournament	Surface	Partner	Opponents	Score
1.	1980	Cuneo, Italy	Clay	(Argentina) Ricardo Cano	(Bolivia) Mario Martinez (Chile) Pedro Rebolledo	4–6, 7–6, 6–2
2.	1981	Galatina, Italy	Clay	(Italy) Patrizio Parrini	(Argentina) Roberto Carruthers (Argentina) Fernando Dalla Fontana	6–4, 5–7, 7–5
3.	1983	Le Touquet, France	Clay	(Argentina) Alejandro Gattiker	(France) Tarik Benhabiles (France) Jean-Louis Haillet	7–6, 6–2
4.	1983	Messina, Italy	Clay	(Argentina) Alejandro Gattiker	(Spain) Juan Aguilera (Peru) Pablo Arraya	7–5, 6–2
5.	1984	Vina Del Mar, Chile	Clay	(Argentina) Gustavo Tiberti	(Chile) Hans Gildemeister (Chile) Belus Prajoux	6–4, 5–7, 6–3
