= Robbie Venter =

South African tennis player and businessman (1960–2024)

Robert Venter
- Full name: Robert Eben Venter
- Country (sports): South Africa
- Born: 7 May 1960 Boksburg, Transvaal, South Africa
- Died: 6 August 2024 (aged 64)
- Plays: Left-handed

Singles
- Career record: 7–19
- Highest ranking: No. 148 (2 January 1984)

Grand Slam singles results
- Wimbledon: 1R (1983)

Doubles
- Career record: 15–27
- Highest ranking: No. 82 (3 January 1983)

Grand Slam doubles results
- French Open: 2R (1983)
- Wimbledon: 1R (1983)

Robert Eben Venter (7 May 1960 – 6 August 2024) was a South African businessman and professional tennis player.

== Biography ==
A left handed player from Boksburg, Venter was the son of South African businessman Bill Venter.

Venter was a semi-finalist at the Wimbledon Juniors in 1978 and moved to the United States that year to take up a tennis scholarship at UCLA. He was a three-time All-American and captained the UCLA side which won the team title in the 1982 NCAA Division I Tennis Championships. After that triumph he became a tour professional and with former UCLA teammate Blaine Willenborg he was runner-up in the doubles at the 1982 U.S. Men's Clay Court Championships, a tournament on the Grand Prix circuit held in Indianapolis. His only singles appearance in the main draw of a grand slam tournament came at the 1983 Wimbledon Championships, where he lost in the first round to Rodney Harmon, in four sets. During his tennis career he won six Challenger titles, three in singles and three in doubles.

Venter retired from tennis in 1985 and completed an MBA at UCLA before working at Bear Stearns for three years. He returned to South Africa in 1990.

In 2011 he replaced his father Bill as CEO of Altron.

Venter died on 6 August 2024, at the age of 64.

== Grand Prix career finals ==
=== Doubles: 1 (0–1) ===
| Result | W/L | Date | Tournament | Surface | Partner | Opponents | Score |
|---|---|---|---|---|---|---|---|
| Loss | 0–1 | Aug 1982 | Indianapolis, US | Clay | (United States) Blaine Willenborg | (United States) Sherwood Stewart (United States) Ferdi Taygan | 4–6, 5–7 |

== Challenger titles ==
=== Singles: (3) ===
| No. | Year | Tournament | Surface | Opponent | Score |
|---|---|---|---|---|---|
| 1. | 1980 | Turin, Italy | Clay | (Spain) Miguel Mir | 6–2, 6–1 |
| 2. | 1983 | Solihull, Great Britain | Clay | (Australia) Broderick Dyke | 6–4, 3–6, 6–3 |
| 3. | 1983 | Lee-on-the-Solent, Great Britain | Clay | (United Kingdom) Jeremy Bates | 6–3, 6–1 |

=== Doubles: (3) ===
| No. | Year | Tournament | Surface | Partner | Opponents | Score |
|---|---|---|---|---|---|---|
| 1. | 1980 | Royan, France | Clay | (United States) Dave Siegler | (Sweden) Jan Gunnarsson (Sweden) Stefan Svensson | 6–4, 6–4 |
| 2. | 1980 | Le Touquet, France | Clay | (United States) Dave Siegler | (Sweden) Hans Simonsson (Sweden) Tenny Svensson | 7–6, 4–6, 6–3 |
| 3. | 1981 | Reus, Spain | Clay | (United States) Egan Adams | (United States) Junie Chatman (New Zealand) Bruce Derlin | 6–7, 6–4, 6–4 |
