= Eduardo Bengoechea =

Argentine tennis player

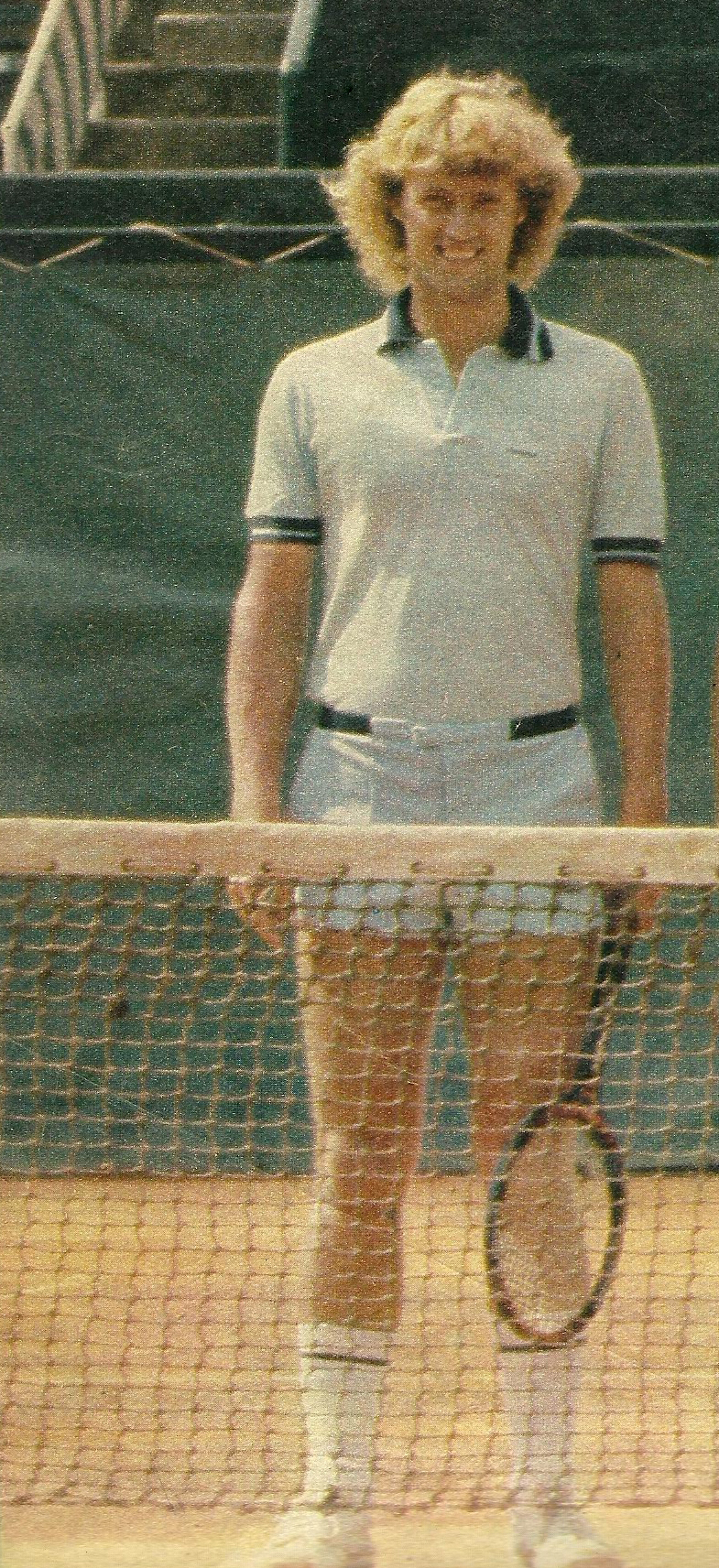
- Country (sports): Argentina
- Residence: Argentina
- Born: 2 July 1959 (age 65); Córdoba, Argentina
- Height: 1.85 m (6 ft 1 in)
- Turned pro: ?
- Plays: Right-handed
- Prize money: $476,094

Singles
- Career record: 103–116
- Career titles: 0
- Highest ranking: No. 21 (September 1987)

Grand Slam singles results
- French Open: 3R (1981, 1988)
- Wimbledon: 1R (1986)
- US Open: 2R (1985, 1986)

Doubles
- Career record: 44–75
- Career titles: 0
- Highest ranking: No. 153 (March 1985)

Grand Slam doubles results
- French Open: 3R (1981)

Mixed doubles
- Career record: 0–2
- Career titles: 0

Grand Slam mixed doubles results
- French Open: 2R (1985)

Eduardo Bengoechea (born 2 July 1959) is an Argentine former tennis player born in Córdoba. He achieved a highest career ranking in singles of world No. 21 in September 1987. Bengoechea did not win a singles or doubles title on the ATP tour level but was twice a finalist in doubles. After his playing career he was captain of the Argentinian Davis Cup team in 1996.

== Career finals ==
=== Doubles (2 losses) ===
Result	W/L	Date	Tournament	Surface	Partner	Opponents	Score
Loss	0–1	Mar 1985	ATP Buenos Aires	Clay	(Uruguay) Diego Pérez	(Argentina) Martín Jaite (Argentina) Christian Miniussi	4–6, 3–6
Loss	0–2	Nov 1988	ATP Buenos Aires	Clay	(Argentina) José Luis Clerc	(Spain) Carlos Costa (Spain) Javier Sánchez	3–6, 6–3, 3–6

Preceded by (Argentina) Ricardo Rivera	Captain of the Argentina Davis Cup team 1996	Succeeded by (Argentina) Daniel Garcia
