= Ramiro Benavides =

Bolivian tennis player

- Country (sports): Bolivia
- Born: 30 January 1947 (age 78); La Paz, Bolivia
- Turned pro: 1964 (amateur tour)
- Retired: 1986
- Plays: Right-handed

Singles
- Career record: 265–303 (46.65%)
- Career titles: 5
- Highest ranking: No. 124 (12 December 1976)

Grand Slam singles results
- French Open: 2R (1976)
- Wimbledon: 1R (1977)
- US Open: 2R (1979)

Doubles
- Career record: 40–117
- Career titles: 0
- Highest ranking: No. 243 (3 January 1983)

Grand Slam doubles results
- French Open: 2R (1975, 1976)
- Wimbledon: 1R (1976, 1977)
- US Open: 1R (1973, 1975, 1976, 1977, 1979)

Ramiro Gonzalo Benavides Saravia (born 30 January 1947) is a former professional tennis player from Bolivia.

== Biography ==
Benavides, who was born in La Paz, received a scholarship to the University Corpus Christi in Texas. He completed a degree in business administration and played collegiate tennis.

He then played professionally, with his best performance on tour coming at the Florence Grand Prix tournament in 1975 when he had a win over world number eight Adriano Panatta and made the semi-finals.

His Davis Cup career for Bolivia spanned 32 years and consisted of eight ties. He first played in 1971 and made what was his last appearance for many years in 1982, but made a comeback in 2003 at the age of 56 to play a doubles match against El Salvador. At the time this made him the second oldest player in Davis Cup history, after Togo's Gadonfin Koptigan Yaka.

Now a tennis coach, Benavides competes regularly on the seniors tennis circuit.

== Challenger titles ==
=== Doubles: (4) ===
No.	Year	Tournament	Surface	Partner	Opponents	Score
1.	1978	Shreveport, U.S.	Hard	(Canada) Réjean Genois	(United States) Woody Blocher (United States) Dick R. Bohrnstedt	7–6, 4–6, 6–2
2.	1978	Asheville, U.S.	Clay	(Canada) Réjean Genois	(United States) Jai DiLouie (United States) Ferdi Taygan	7–5, 4–6, 7–6
3.	1981	Naples, Italy	Clay	(Chile) Ricardo Acuña	(Chile) Alejandro Pierola (Argentina) Ricardo Rivera	6–1, 6–1
4.	1981	Zell am See, Austria	Clay	(Chile) Ricardo Acuña	(Australia) Wayne Hampson (Australia) Chris Johnstone	6–7, 7–6, 7–6, 7–5
