= Franco Merlone =

Italian tennis player

- Country (sports): Italy
- Born: 16 December 1957 (age 67); Turin, Italy
- Plays: Right-handed

Singles
- Career record: 4–4
- Highest ranking: No. 224 (1 apr 1981)

Franco Merlone (born 16 December 1957) is an Italian former professional tennis player.

Born in Turin, Merlone was active on the professional tour in the late 1970s and early 1980s. He had his best tournament run as a main draw qualifier at the 1980 Campionati Internazionali di Sicilia, where he fell in the semi-finals to Guillermo Vilas, after having secured earlier wins over Rod Frawley and Phil Dent.
