= Marko Ostoja =

Croatian-Yugoslav tennis player

- Country (sports): (Socialist Federal Republic of Yugoslavia) Yugoslavia
- Residence: Split, Croatia
- Born: 20 October 1960 (age 64); Bonn, West Germany
- Height: 1.75 m (5 ft 9 in)
- Plays: Right-handed
- Prize money: $292,826

Singles
- Career record: 81–139
- Career titles: 1
- Highest ranking: No. 74 (09 Apr 1984)

Grand Slam singles results
- French Open: 3R (1982)
- Wimbledon: 1R (1984, 1985)
- US Open: 3R (1985)

Doubles
- Career record: 36–73
- Career titles: 0
- Highest ranking: No. 157 (26 Nov 1984)

Grand Slam doubles results
- French Open: 2R (1983)
- US Open: 1R (1984)

Marko Ostoja (born 20 October 1960) is a former professional tennis player from Croatia who competed for Yugoslavia.

== Career ==
Ostoja was the Yugoslavian National Champion in 1978, having earlier won the event as a junior, in the 14s, 16 and 18s age groups.

He had his best year on tour in 1981 when he won his first career title at Brussels and reached the doubles finals of the Austrian Open. The Croatian also reached the semi-finals in Stowe, Vermont, that year.

In 1982 he made the third round of the 1982 French Open, with wins over José Luis Damiani and Gilles Moretton. His best tournament showing came in Florence, where he was a semi-finalist.

At Cologne he put some good performances together in both 1983 and 1984, with quarter-final and semi-final appearances respectively.

Ostoja reached another Grand Slam third round in the 1985 US Open. He had one of the best wins of his career at the Lipton International Players Championships in Delray Beach that year, defeating world number six Henrik Sundström in straight sets.

He first played Davis Cup tennis for Yugoslavia in 1979 and went on to participate in 11 ties, winning 18 of his 27 matches, 11 in singles and seven in doubles.

== Grand Prix career finals ==
=== Singles: 1 (1-0) ===
Result	W/L	Date	Tournament	Surface	Opponent	Score
Win	1–0	Jun 1981	Brussels, Belgium	Clay	(Ecuador) Ricardo Ycaza	4–6, 6–4, 7–5

=== Doubles: 1 (0–1) ===
Result	W/L	Date	Tournament	Surface	Partner	Opponents	Score
Loss	0–1	Jul 1981	Kitzbühel, Austria	Clay	(Netherlands) Louk Sanders	(Australia) David Carter (Australia) Paul Kronk	6–7, 1–6

== Challenger titles ==
=== Singles: (3) ===
No.	Year	Tournament	Surface	Opponent	Score
1.	1983	Tampere, Finland	Clay	(United States) Scott Lipton	6–4, 6–2
2.	1986	Lisbon, Portugal	Clay	(Australia) John Frawley	6–2, 2–6, 6–2
3.	1988	Strasbourg, France	Clay	(Sweden) Tomas Nydahl	6–2, 6–2

=== Doubles: (1) ===
No.	Year	Tournament	Surface	Partner	Opponents	Score
1.	1981	Barcelona, Spain	Clay	(United States) Junie Chatman	(Paraguay) Francisco González (Canada) Derek Segal	6–4, 7–5
