= Gustavo Guerrero =

Argentine tennis player

- Country (sports): Argentina
- Born: 22 October 1959 (age 65); Buenos Aires, Argentina
- Height: 1.80 m (5 ft 11 in)
- Plays: Left-handed

Singles
- Career record: 6–20
- Career titles: 0
- Highest ranking: No. 78 (22 December 1980)

Grand Slam singles results
- French Open: 1R (1981, 1984)

Doubles
- Career record: 11–26
- Career titles: 0
- Highest ranking: No. 92 (14 July 1986)

Grand Slam doubles results
- French Open: 2R (1986)

Gustavo Guerrero (born 22 October 1959) is a former professional tennis player from Argentina.

== Career ==
Guerro competed in five French Opens. He lost to Rod Frawley in the first round of the 1981 French Open and then to another Australian, Paul McNamee, in the 1984 French Open opening round. His only Grand Slam win was in the men's doubles at the 1986 French Open, where he and Spaniard José Clavet beat Eddie Edwards and Francisco González, before being eliminated in the second round.

The Argentine was a semi-finalist at the Brussels Outdoor tournament in 1980, securing wins over Helmar Stiegler, Mike Cahill and Andreas Maurer.

== Challenger titles ==
=== Singles: (1) ===
No.	Year	Tournament	Surface	Opponent	Score
1.	1980	Curitiba, Brazil	Clay	(Brazil) Marcos Hocevar	7–6, 6–3

=== Doubles: (5) ===
No.	Year	Tournament	Surface	Partner	Opponents	Score
1.	1982	Bari, Italy	Clay	(Argentina) Alejandro Ganzábal	(Italy) Luca Bottazzi (Switzerland) Ivan Dupasquier	6–3, 6–2
2.	1986	Clermont-Ferrand, France	Clay	(Argentina) Javier Frana	(Israel) Gilad Bloom (West Germany) Carl-Uwe Steeb	6–1, 6–0
3.	1986	Chartres, France	Clay	(Argentina) Javier Frana	(Iran) Mansour Bahrami (France) Éric Winogradsky	6–2, 6–4
4.	1991	Bogotá, Colombia	Clay	(Argentina) Roberto Saad	(Brazil) José Daher (Brazil) César Kist	6–4, 6–4
5.	1991	Cali, Colombia	Clay	(Argentina) Roberto Saad	(Argentina) Gustavo Garetto (Argentina) Marcelo Ingaramo	6–4, 7–6
