= Ian Harris (tennis) =

American tennis player (born 1952)

- Full name: Ian Harris
- Country (sports): United States
- Born: November 16, 1952 (age 73)

Singles
- Career record: 1–1
- Highest ranking: No. 259 (January 4, 1982)

Doubles
- Career record: 2–7
- Highest ranking: No. 288 (January 3, 1983)

Grand Slam doubles results
- French Open: 1R (1980)
- Wimbledon: 1R (1981)

Ian Harris (born November 16, 1952) is an American former professional tennis player and current tennis coach and amateur golfer.

== Biography ==
=== Early life ===
Harris was born on November 16, 1952, in the United States. He was raised in Michigan, where he competed in the regional junior circuits throughout his youth before transitioning to the professional tour.

=== Tennis playing career ===
Harris appeared in the men's doubles main draw at the 1980 French Open and 1981 Wimbledon Championships. He competed in Men's Doubles in the 1980 French Open with Toby Crabel, and they lost their first-round match against Vitas Gerulaitis and former World No. 1 Fred Stolle in straight sets.

On the Grand Prix circuit he made the doubles quarter-finals at the Lagos Open in 1980 and the Columbus Open in 1981. His best performance in singles came at the Grand Prix Cleveland in 1981 when he reached the round of 16. Both of his two Challenger titles were in doubles.

=== Tennis coaching and golf career ===
After retiring from the professional tennis circuit at the age of 32, Harris transitioned into coaching and began working as a tennis instructor in Michigan, serving as a teaching professional at the Franklin Athletic Club in Southfield.

He also took up golf and established a prominent career in regional amateur golf tournaments. A member of the Golf Association of Michigan (GAM), Harris won the[Michigan Senior Amateur championship in 2008 and later qualified for the 2017 U.S. Senior Amateur. In 2019, he completed a "Grand Slam" of regional senior golf by capturing four major titles, including the GAM Senior Championship and the GAM Super Senior Championship, earning him the title of GAM Super Senior Player of the Year. He secured another major victory in 2020 by winning the super-senior flight at the Michigan Senior Match Play tournament.

== Challenger titles ==
=== Doubles: (2) ===
No.	Year	Tournament	Surface	Partner	Opponents	Score
1.	1981	Ogun, Nigeria	Clay	(United States) Craig Wittus	(United States) Guy Fritz (Canada) Harry Fritz	7–6, 7–6
2.	1981	Bari, Italy	Clay	(Chile) Belus Prajoux	(Italy) Gianni Marchetti (Chile) Alejandro Pierola	6–4, 6–2

== See also ==
- Lagos Open (1976–1991)
