= Pavel Huťka =

Czechoslovak tennis player (born 1949)

- Country (sports): Czechoslovakia
- Born: 28 February 1949 (age 77) Šumperk, Czechoslovakia
- Plays: Right-handed

Singles
- Career record: 38–61
- Career titles: 0
- Highest ranking: No. 103 (31 Dec 1978)

Grand Slam singles results
- French Open: 3R (1977)
- Wimbledon: 1R (1979)

Doubles
- Career record: 36–51
- Career titles: 0

Grand Slam doubles results
- French Open: 2R (1977)

Pavel Huťka (born 28 February 1949) is a Czech former professional tennis player and current tennis trainer.

== Career ==
Hutka held a match point against Italy's Adriano Panatta in the opening round of the 1976 French Open, but lost 10–12 in the fifth set. The Italian went on to win the tournament.

He made the third round of the 1977 French Open (beating Jan Šimbera and Brian Teacher) and appeared in a further three French Opens, without matching that effort.

Hutka was a doubles finalist at Kitzbuhel in 1979. He and partner Pavel Složil lost the final to Mike Fishbach and Chris Lewis.

On the Grand Prix singles circuit he made three quarter-finals at Munich in 1975, Nice in 1978 Nice and Stuttgart in 1979.

== Grand Prix career finals ==
=== Doubles: 2 (0–2) ===
Result	W/L	Date	Tournament	Surface	Partner	Opponents	Score
Loss	0–1	Jun 1977	Berlin, Germany	Clay	(Czechoslovakia) Vladimír Zedník	(Chile) Hans Gildemeister (Chile) Belus Prajoux	not played, shared
Loss	0–2	Jul 1978	Kitzbühel, Austria	Clay	(Czechoslovakia) Pavel Složil	(United States) Mike Fishbach (New Zealand) Chris Lewis	7–6, 4–6, 3–6

== Challenger titles ==
=== Doubles: (2) ===
No.	Year	Tournament	Surface	Partner	Opponents	Score
1.	1980	Zell Am See, Austria	Clay	(Czechoslovakia) Jiří Hřebec	(Australia) Wayne Pascoe (United States) Dave Siegler	3–6, 7–5, 7–6, 6–2
2.	1981	Bara, Spain	Clay	(Czechoslovakia) Jiří Hřebec	(Spain) Ángel Giménez (Colombia) Jairo Velasco	7–5, 4–6, 9–7
