= Ricardo Rivera (tennis) =

Argentine tennis player

- Country (sports): Argentina
- Born: 8 April 1961 (age 63); Villa Maria, Argentina
- Height: 5 ft 6 in (168 cm)

Singles
- Career record: 0–1
- Highest ranking: No. 236 (19 May 1986)

Doubles
- Career record: 0–1
- Highest ranking: No. 322 (19 May 1986)
Medal record
Southern Cross Games
Silver medal – second place	1978 La Paz	Mixed doubles
Bronze medal – third place	1978 La Paz	Men's doubles

Ricardo Rivera (born 8 April 1961) is an Argentine former professional tennis player.

Rivera, who goes by the nickname "Caio", represented Argentina at the 1978 Southern Cross Games (now South American Games) and won two medals in doubles.

While competing on the professional tour he reached a career high singles ranking of 236 in the world and made his only Grand Prix main draw appearance at the Buenos Aires tournament in 1982.

From 1994 to 1995 he served as captain of the Argentina Davis Cup team.
