= Christophe Casa =

French tennis player

- Country (sports): France
- Born: 30 May 1957 (age 67); Nice, France
- Height: 1.78 m (5 ft 10 in)
- Plays: Right-handed

Singles
- Career record: 16–37
- Career titles: 0
- Highest ranking: No. 146 (22 December 1980)

Grand Slam singles results
- Australian Open: 1R (1977)
- French Open: 2R (1977, 1980)

Doubles
- Career record: 5–15
- Career titles: 0
- Highest ranking: No. 727 (16 July 1984)

Grand Slam doubles results
- French Open: 2R (1977)

Christophe Casa (born 30 May 1957) is a former professional tennis player from France.

== Career ==
Casa won the 16 and under Orange Bowl title in 1973 and was the 1974 French Open boys' singles champion, defeating West German Ulrich Marten in the final.

In 1977, Casa made the quarter-finals of the Nice International Championships. He also made the second round of the French Open men's draw that year (beating Bob Carmichael).

Casa made the second round of the 1980 French Open as well, defeating countryman Jean-Louis Haillet, before losing in the second round to Van Winitsky, in five sets.

He reached the quarter-finals at Nice again in 1983, with wins over Guy Forget and top 20 player Jimmy Arias.

== Challenger titles ==
=== Singles: (2) ===
No.	Date	Tournament	Surface	Opponent	Score
1.	1980	Royan, France	Clay	(France) Dominique Bedel	6–7, 6–4, 6–1, 6–0
2.	1980	Le Touquet, France	Clay	(France) Jérôme Vanier	6–4, 5–7, 6–4, 4–6, 6–2
