= Jean-François Caujolle =

French tennis player

- Country (sports): France
- Born: 31 March 1953 (age 73) Marseille, France
- Plays: Left-handed

Singles
- Career record: 83–115
- Highest ranking: No. 59 (31 October 1977)

Grand Slam singles results
- Australian Open: 1R (1973, 1974)
- French Open: 3R (1976, 1979, 1981)
- Wimbledon: 2R (1975)
- US Open: 2R (1976)

Doubles
- Career record: 6–40
- Highest ranking: No. 184 (2 January 1978)

Grand Slam doubles results
- Australian Open: 2R (1974)
- French Open: 1R (1972, 1974, 1976, 1977, 1978, 1979, 1980)
- Wimbledon: 1R (1975, 1976)

Jean-François Caujolle (French pronunciation: [ʒɑ̃.fʁɑ̃swa koʒɔl]; born 31 March 1953) is a former professional tennis player from France. He reached a career-high ranking of No. 59 in singles on 31 September 1977.

Caujolle retired from tennis in 1981 and became a coach in a Marseille tennis camp. In 1993, he created the ATP International Series Open 13 in Marseille, and became co-director, alongside Cédric Pioline, of the BNP Paribas Masters tournament of Paris in 2007. In 2008, he initiated, with Gilles Moretton and Jean-Louis Haillet, the creation of the Masters France exhibition tournament in Toulouse.

== Career finals ==
=== Singles (2 runner-ups) ===
Result	W/L	Date	Tournament	Surface	Opponent	Score
Loss	0–1	Jan 1976	Copenhagen, Denmark	Carpet (i)	(Denmark) Lars Elvstrøm	6–4, 6–4
Loss	0–2	Jul 1977	Gstaad, Switzerland	Clay	(United States) Jeff Borowiak	2–6, 6–1, 6–3
