= Alejandro Gattiker =

Argentine tennis player

- Country (sports): Argentina
- Born: 5 May 1958 (age 66); Buenos Aires, Argentina
- Height: 1.80 m (5 ft 11 in)
- Plays: Right-handed

Singles
- Career record: 5–24
- Career titles: 0
- Highest ranking: No. 194 (4 Jan 1982)

Grand Slam singles results
- French Open: 1R (1982)

Doubles
- Career record: 22–37
- Career titles: 0
- Highest ranking: No. 119 (3 Jan 1983)

Grand Slam doubles results
- French Open: 1R (1977, 1980, 1981, 1983)
- Wimbledon: 1R (1980)

Alejandro Gattiker (born 5 May 1958) is a former professional tennis player from Argentina.

== Career ==
Gattiker, having made it through qualifying, played Mike Myburg in the first round of the 1982 French Open. He was beaten in straight sets. The Argentinian played men's doubles at five Grand Slam tournaments, three with his brother Carlos, but was never able to get past the opening round. He made the doubles semi-finals at Kitzbühel with his brother in 1981 and was also a doubles semi-finalist twice the following year, partnering Brent Pirow at Geneva and Ricardo Ycaza at Itaparica. As a singles player he had his best win when he defeated veteran Romanian Ilie Năstase in 1981, at Viña del Mar.

Although he missed out on Davis Cup representation during his playing career, Gattiker had two stints as captain of the Argentina Davis Cup team. Players he has coached on tour include Marcelo Filippini, Hernán Gumy, Mariano Hood, Nicolás Lapentti and Mariano Zabaleta.

== Challenger titles ==
=== Doubles: (2) ===
No.	Year	Tournament	Surface	Partner	Opponents	Score
1.	1983	Le Touquet, France	Clay	(Argentina) Carlos Gattiker	(France) Tarik Benhabiles (France) Jean-Louis Haillet	7–6, 6–2
2.	1983	Messina, Italy	Clay	(Argentina) Carlos Gattiker	(Spain) Juan Aguilera (Peru) Pablo Arraya	7–5, 6–2
