= Fernando Dalla Fontana =

Argentine tennis player

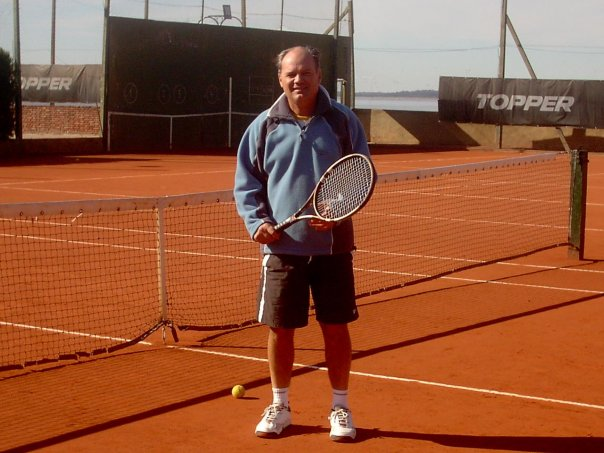
- Country (sports): Argentina
- Born: 10 April 1958 (age 68) Santa Fe, Argentina
- Height: 5 ft 9 in (175 cm)
- Plays: Right-handed

Singles
- Career record: 11–28
- Highest ranking: No. 134 (26 Dec 1979)

Grand Slam singles results
- French Open: 1R (1981)
- Wimbledon: Q1 (1977)

Doubles
- Career record: 10–23

Grand Slam doubles results
- French Open: 2R (1978, 1981)
- Wimbledon: Q1 (1977)

Grand Slam mixed doubles results
- French Open: 1R (1978)

Fernando Dalla Fontana (born 10 April 1958) is an Argentine former professional tennis player. He is known by his nickname "Dalla"

Born and raised in Santa Fe, Dalla Fontana was a 1976 French Open junior semi-finalist and won a Galea Cup with the national team in 1977.

Dalla Fontana featured in two Davis Cup ties for Argentina, debuting as an 18-year old. Both of his two career ties were against Ecuador and he had singles wins over Miguel Olvera and Raúl Viver.

On the professional circuit he reached a best singles world ranking of 134, with a main draw appearance at the 1981 French Open and three Grand Prix quarter-finals amongst his achievements.

== See also ==
- List of Argentina Davis Cup team representatives
