= Ricardo Cano =

Argentine tennis player

- Country (sports): Argentina
- Born: 27 December 1951 (age 74) Buenos Aires, Argentina
- Height: 1.70 m (5 ft 7 in)
- Plays: Right-handed
- Prize money: $461

Singles
- Career record: 135–149
- Career titles: 0
- Highest ranking: No. 41 (26 July 1976)

Grand Slam singles results
- French Open: 3R (1975, 1978, 1981)
- Wimbledon: 1R (1976)
- US Open: 3R (1975, 1976)

Doubles
- Career record: 118–126
- Career titles: 4
- Highest ranking: No. 50 (12 December 1976)

Ricardo Cano (born 27 December 1951) is a former professional tennis player from Argentina. Most of his tennis success was in doubles. During his career, he won four doubles titles and finished runner-up six times.

Cano participated in 23 Davis Cup ties for Argentina from 1971 to 1982, posting a 14–13 record in singles and a 9–7 record in doubles. His defeat of Dick Stockton contributed to the Argentinian victory in the Americas Zone final of the 1977 Davis Cup.

== Career finals ==
=== Doubles: 10 (4 titles / 6 runner-ups) ===
Result	W/L	Date	Tournament	Surface	Partner	Opponents	Score
Win	1–0	Nov 1973	Buenos Aires, Argentina	Clay	(Argentina) Guillermo Vilas	(Chile) Patricio Cornejo (Colombia) Iván Molina	7–6, 6–3
Win	2–0	Jul 1976	Hilversum, Netherlands	Clay	(Chile) Belus Prajoux	(Poland) Wojtek Fibak (Hungary) Balázs Taróczy	6–4, 6–3
Loss	2–1	Aug 1976	North Conway, U.S.	Clay	(Paraguay) Víctor Pecci	(United States) Brian Gottfried (Mexico) Raúl Ramírez	3–6, 0–6
Loss	2–2	Nov 1976	São Paulo, Brazil	Carpet	(Chile) Belus Prajoux	(Argentina) Lito Álvarez (Paraguay) Víctor Pecci	4–6, 6–3, 3–6
Loss	2–3	Nov 1976	Buenos Aires, Argentina	Clay	(Chile) Belus Prajoux	(Brazil) Carlos Kirmayr (Argentina) Tito Vázquez	4–6, 5–7
Loss	2–4	Nov 1977	Buenos Aires, Argentina	Clay	(Spain) Antonio Muñoz	(Romania) Ion Țiriac (Argentina) Guillermo Vilas	4–6, 0–6
Win	3–4	Apr 1981	Bournemouth, U.K.	Clay	(Paraguay) Víctor Pecci	(United Kingdom) Buster Mottram (Czechoslovakia) Tomáš Šmíd	6–4, 3–6, 6–3
Win	4–4	Jun 1981	Brussels, Belgium	Clay	(Ecuador) Andrés Gómez	(Brazil) Carlos Kirmayr (Brazil) Cássio Motta	6–2, 6–2
Loss	4–5	Nov 1981	Santiago, Chile	Clay	(Chile) Belus Prajoux	(Chile) Hans Gildemeister (Ecuador) Andrés Gómez	2–6, 6–7
Loss	4–6	Nov 1983	Bahia, Brazil	Hard	(Brazil) Thomaz Koch	(Brazil) Givaldo Barbosa (Brazil) João Soares	
