= 1983 Cologne Cup – Doubles =

Doubles
- 1983 Cologne Cup

Final
- Champions: (United States) Nick Saviano (Romania) Florin Segărceanu
- Runners-up: (United States) Paul Annacone (United States) Eric Korita
- Score: 6–3, 6–4

Details
- Draw: 16
- Seeds: 4

Events
| Singles | Doubles |
| ← 1982 · | Cologne Grand Prix | · 1984 → |

José Luis Damiani and Carlos Kirmayr were the defending champions but Damiani did not compete this year, having retired from professional tennis during this season. Kirmayr teamed up with Cássio Motta and lost in the quarterfinals to Nick Saviano and Florin Segărceanu.

Saviano and Segărceanu won the title by defeating Paul Annacone and Eric Korita 6–3, 6–4 in the final.

== Seeds ==
1. (Brazil) Carlos Kirmayr / (Brazil) Cássio Motta (quarterfinals)
2. (Czechoslovakia) Pavel Složil / (Czechoslovakia) Tomáš Šmíd (quarterfinals)
3. (United States) Brian Gottfried / (United States) Sandy Mayer (semifinals, withdrew)
4. (United States) Mark Dickson / (South Africa) Frew McMillan (first round)

== Draw ==
=== Key ===
- Q = Qualifier
- WC = Wild card
- LL = Lucky loser
- Alt = Alternate
- SE = Special exempt
- PR = Protected ranking
- ITF = ITF entry
- JE = Junior exempt
- w/o = Walkover
- r = Retired
- d = Defaulted
- SR = Special ranking

=== Draw ===
First round
1 | (Brazil) C Kirmayr (Brazil) C Motta | 6 | 6
(Switzerland) I Dupasquier (Czechoslovakia) J Granát | 2 | 4
(United States) N Saviano (Romania) F Segărceanu | 6 | 5 | 7
(West Germany) B Becker (West Germany) E Jelen | 1 | 7 | 5
4 | (United States) M Dickson (South Africa) F McMillan | 6 | 6
(United States) M Purcell (United States) S Smith | 7 | 7
(Republic of Ireland) M Doyle (United States) F McNair | 7 | 6
(Argentina) F Yunis (Argentina) JC Yunis | 5 | 4
(Socialist Federal Republic of Yugoslavia) M Ostoja (Netherlands) M Schapers | 7 | 6 | 6
(India) A Amritraj (Brazil) M Hocevar | 6 | 7 | 4
(United States) E Fromm (Israel) S Glickstein | 4 | 0
3 | (United States) B Gottfried (United States) S Mayer | 6 | 6
(United States) P Annacone (United States) E Korita | 6 | 6
(West Germany) HD Beutel (West Germany) C Zipf | 3 | 4
(United Kingdom) J Smith (United States) T Wilkison | 4 | 7 | 6
2 | (Czechoslovakia) P Složil (Czechoslovakia) T Šmíd | 6 | 6 | 7

Quarterfinals
1 | (Brazil) C Kirmayr (Brazil) C Motta | 3 | 7 | 5
(United States) N Saviano (Romania) F Segărceanu | 6 | 6 | 7
(United States) M Purcell (United States) S Smith | 4 | 6
(Republic of Ireland) M Doyle (United States) F McNair | 6 | 7
(Socialist Federal Republic of Yugoslavia) M Ostoja (Netherlands) M Schapers | 3 | 4
3 | (United States) B Gottfried (United States) S Mayer | 6 | 6
(United States) P Annacone (United States) E Korita | 6 | 6
2 | (Czechoslovakia) P Složil (Czechoslovakia) T Šmíd | 1 | 4

Semifinals
(United States) N Saviano (Romania) F Segărceanu | 3 | 7 | 6
(Republic of Ireland) M Doyle (United States) F McNair | 6 | 5 | 4
3 | (United States) B Gottfried (United States) S Mayer
(United States) P Annacone (United States) E Korita | w/o

Final
(United States) N Saviano (Romania) F Segărceanu | 6 | 6
(United States) P Annacone (United States) E Korita | 3 | 4
