= 1983 Tel Aviv Open – Singles =

Tennis

Singles
- 1983 Tel Aviv Open

Final
- Champion: (United States) Aaron Krickstein
- Runner-up: (West Germany) Christoph Zipf
- Score: 7–6, 6–3

Details
- Draw: 32
- Seeds: 8

Events
Singles	Doubles
- Tel Aviv Open

Aaron Krickstein defeated Christoph Zipf in the final, 7–6, 6–3 to win the singles tennis title at the 1983 Tel Aviv Open. At 16 years and 2 months old, Krickstein became the youngest winner of an ATP title in the Open Era, a record that still stands (as of 2026).

Mel Purcell was the reigning champion from when the event was last held in 1981, but did not participate this year.

== Seeds ==
1. (Sweden) Henrik Sundström (first round, retired)
2. (Israel) Shlomo Glickstein (first round)
3. (United Kingdom) Colin Dowdeswell (semifinals)
4. (South Africa) Robbie Venter (first round)
5. (Hungary) Zoltan Kuharszky (first round)
6. (South Africa) Bernard Mitton (first round)
7. (South Africa) Danie Visser (first round)
8. (South Africa) Mike Myburg (first round)

== Draw ==
Key

- Q = Qualifier
- WC = Wild card
- LL = Lucky loser
- Alt = Alternate
- ITF = ITF entry
- PR = Protected ranking
- SR = Special ranking
- SE = Special exempt
- JE = Junior exempt
- JR = Junior Accelerator Programme entrant
- CO = College Accelerator Programme entrant
- NG = Next Gen Accelerator Program entrant
- w/o = Walkover
- r = Retired
- d = Defaulted

=== Finals ===
Semifinals
(United States) Aaron Krickstein	6	6
3	(United Kingdom) Colin Dowdeswell	4	4
(West Germany) Christoph Zipf	3	7	6
(West Germany) Rolf Gehring	6	5	3

Final
(United States) Aaron Krickstein	7	6
(West Germany) Christoph Zipf	6	3

=== Top half ===
First round
1	(Sweden) H Sundström	3	0^{r}
(United States) A Krickstein	6	1
Q	(South Africa) S van der Merwe	6	3	7
(South Africa) F Punčec	3	6	6
(Czechoslovakia) J Granát	0	3
(Israel) S Perkiss	6	6
(West Germany) H Theissen	6	6
8	(South Africa) M Myburg	3	2
3	(United Kingdom) C Dowdeswell	6	6	6
(South Africa) R Chappell	2	7	1
(Israel) A Mansdorf	6	6
(Austria) P Feigl	2	3
Q	(South Africa) T Viljoen	4	2
Q	(Sweden) S Svensson	6	6
(West Germany) J Becka	7	6
5	(Hungary) Z Kuharszky	6	4

Second round
(United States) A Krickstein	6	7
Q	(South Africa) S van der Merwe	2	5
(Israel) S Perkiss	6	6
(West Germany) H Theissen	3	2
3	(United Kingdom) C Dowdeswell	6	6
(Israel) A Mansdorf	2	4
Q	(Sweden) S Svensson	6	6	3
(West Germany) J Becka	7	4	6

Quarterfinals
(United States) A Krickstein	6	4	7
(Israel) S Perkiss	4	6	6
3	(United Kingdom) C Dowdeswell	6	6
(West Germany) J Becka	3	1

Semifinals
(United States) A Krickstein	6	6
3	(United Kingdom) C Dowdeswell	4	4

=== Bottom half ===
First round
6	(South Africa) B Mitton	6	4	5
(Sweden) P Hjertquist	4	6	7
(France) G Moretton	6	7
(West Germany) H-D Beutel	3	5
(Austria) B Pils	1	3
(West Germany) C Zipf	6	6
(West Germany) P Elter	7	3	6
4	(South Africa) R Venter	5	6	3
7	(South Africa) D Visser	4	3
(West Germany) R Gehring	6	6
(South Africa) E Edwards	6	6
(United States) H Solomon	2	0
Q	(Israel) Ilan Sher	6	2
(United States) R Meyer	7	6
(United States) R Evett	6	7
2	(Israel) S Glickstein	2	6

Second round
(Sweden) P Hjertquist	5	2
(France) G Moretton	7	6
(West Germany) C Zipf	3	7	7
(West Germany) P Elter	6	6	6
(West Germany) R Gehring	6	6	7
(South Africa) E Edwards	3	7	6
(United States) R Meyer	6	4	7
(United States) R Evett	1	6	6

Quarterfinals
(France) G Moretton	6	r
(West Germany) C Zipf	7
(West Germany) R Gehring	6	6
(United States) R Meyer	3	2

Semifinals
(West Germany) C Zipf	3	7	6
(West Germany) R Gehring	6	5	3
