= 1983 Cologne Cup – Singles =

Singles
- 1983 Cologne Cup

Final
- Champion: (Republic of Ireland) Matt Doyle
- Runner-up: (West Germany) Hans-Dieter Beutel
- Score: 1–6, 6–1, 6–2

Details
- Draw: 32
- Seeds: 8

Events
Singles	Doubles
← 1982 ·	Cologne Grand Prix	· 1984 →

Kevin Curren was the defending champion, but did not compete this year.

Matt Doyle won the title by defeating Hans-Dieter Beutel 1–6, 6–1, 6–2 in the final.

== Seeds ==
1. (United States) Brian Gottfried (first round)
2. (United States) Sandy Mayer (quarterfinals, withdrew)
3. (Czechoslovakia) Tomáš Šmíd (first round)
4. (United States) Mel Purcell (first round)
5. (United States) Tim Mayotte (first round)
6. (Israel) Shlomo Glickstein (second round)
7. (United States) Eric Korita (second round, retired)
8. (United States) Mark Dickson (second round)

== Draw ==
=== Key ===
- Q = Qualifier
- WC = Wild card
- LL = Lucky loser
- Alt = Alternate
- SE = Special exempt
- PR = Protected ranking
- ITF = ITF entry
- JE = Junior exempt
- w/o = Walkover
- r = Retired
- d = Defaulted
- SR = Special ranking

=== Finals ===
Semifinals
(Germany) Hans-Dieter Beutel	7	2	6
(Czechoslovakia) Pavel Složil	5	6	1
(Republic of Ireland) Matt Doyle	3	6	6
(South Africa) Bernard Mitton	6	3	4

Final
(Germany) Hans-Dieter Beutel	6	1	2
(Republic of Ireland) Matt Doyle	1	6	6

=== Top half ===
First round
1	(United States) B Gottfried	3	6
(United States) S Smith	6	7
Q	(West Germany) E Jelen	4	6	6
(United States) S Lipton	6	3	1
(West Germany) HD Beutel	6	6	6
(Brazil) C Kirmayr	7	4	4
(Netherlands) M Schapers	2	6	2
6	(Israel) S Glickstein	6	2	6
4	(United States) M Purcell	5	3
(Brazil) C Motta	7	6
Q	(United States) P Annacone	6	6	6
(United States) N Saviano	3	7	7
(Czechoslovakia) P Složil	6	6
(United States) E Fromm	4	4
Q	(France) T Benhabiles	2	2
8	(United States) M Dickson	6	6

Second round
(United States) S Smith	5	4
Q	(West Germany) E Jelen	7	6
(West Germany) HD Beutel	6	7
6	(Israel) S Glickstein	1	6
(Brazil) C Motta	6	4	6
(United States) N Saviano	3	6	7
(Czechoslovakia) P Složil	6	6
8	(United States) M Dickson	2	4

Quarterfinals
Q	(West Germany) E Jelen	4	5
(West Germany) HD Beutel	6	7
(United States) N Saviano	3	4
(Czechoslovakia) P Složil	6	6

Semifinals
(West Germany) HD Beutel	7	2	6
(Czechoslovakia) P Složil	5	6	1

=== Bottom half ===
First round
7	(United States) E Korita	6	5	6
(Brazil) M Hocevar	3	7	4
(Belgium) B Boileau	4	0
(Socialist Federal Republic of Yugoslavia) M Ostoja	6	6
(Romania) F Segărceanu	0	6	6
(West Germany) P Elter	6	2	2
(Republic of Ireland) M Doyle	4	6	6
3	(Czechoslovakia) T Šmíd	6	3	4
5	(United States) T Mayotte	4	5
(United States) T Wilkison	6	7
(South Africa) B Mitton	6	6
Q	(West Germany) J Becka	3	4
(West Germany) A Maurer	7	6
(South Africa) D Visser	6	2
(West Germany) B Becker	6	4	4
2	(United States) S Mayer	3	6	6

Second round
7	(United States) E Korita	2	0^{r}
(Socialist Federal Republic of Yugoslavia) M Ostoja	6	3
(Romania) F Segărceanu	4	1
(Republic of Ireland) M Doyle	6	6
(United States) T Wilkison	6	4
(South Africa) B Mitton	7	6
(West Germany) A Maurer
2	(United States) S Mayer	w/o

Quarterfinals
(Socialist Federal Republic of Yugoslavia) M Ostoja	4	0
(Republic of Ireland) M Doyle	6	6
(South Africa) B Mitton	w/o
2	(United States) S Mayer

Semifinals
(Republic of Ireland) M Doyle	3	6	6
(South Africa) B Mitton	6	3	4
