= 1983 Cologne Cup =

German tennis tournament

- Date: 24–30 October
- Edition: 8th
- Category: Grand Prix
- Draw: 32S / 16D
- Prize money: $75,000
- Surface: Carpet / indoor
- Location: Cologne, West Germany

Champions

Singles
- (Republic of Ireland) Matt Doyle

Doubles
- (United States) Nick Saviano / (Romania) Florin Segărceanu
← 1982 ·	Cologne Grand Prix	· 1984 →

The 1983 Cologne Cup, also known as the European Indoor Championships, was a men's tennis tournament played on indoor carpet courts in Cologne, West Germany that was part of the 1983 Volvo Grand Prix circuit. It was the eighth edition of the tournament and was held from 24 October through 30 October 1983. Unseeded Matt Doyle won the singles title.

== Finals ==
=== Singles ===
(Republic of Ireland) Matt Doyle defeated (West Germany) Hans-Dieter Beutel 1–6, 6–1, 6–2

- It was Doyle's only singles title of his career.

=== Doubles ===
(United States) Nick Saviano / (Romania) Florin Segărceanu defeated (United States) Paul Annacone / (United States) Eric Korita 6–3, 6–4
