= 1983 Tel Aviv Open – Doubles =

Doubles
- 1983 Tel Aviv Open

Final
- Champions: (United Kingdom) Colin Dowdeswell (Hungary) Zoltán Kuhárszky
- Runners-up: (West Germany) Peter Elter (Austria) Peter Feigl
- Score: 6–4, 7–5

Details
- Draw: 16
- Seeds: 4

Events
Singles	Doubles
- Tel Aviv Open

The Tel Aviv Open was not held in 1982.

Colin Dowdeswell and Zoltan Kuharszky won the title, defeating Peter Elter and Peter Feigl 6–4, 7–5 in the final.

== Seeds ==
1. (South Africa) Tian Viljoen / (South Africa) Danie Visser (semifinals)
2. (United States) Richard Meyer / (France) Gilles Moretton (quarterfinals, withdrew)
3. (United Kingdom) Colin Dowdeswell / (Hungary) Zoltán Kuhárszky (champions)
4. (United States) Rodney Crowley / (United States) Rand Evett (semifinals)

== Draw ==
Key

- Q = Qualifier
- WC = Wild card
- LL = Lucky loser
- Alt = Alternate
- ITF = ITF entry
- PR = Protected ranking
- SR = Special ranking
- SE = Special exempt
- JE = Junior exempt
- JR = Junior Accelerator Programme entrant
- CO = College Accelerator Programme entrant
- NG = Next Gen Accelerator Program entrant
- w/o = Walkover
- r = Retired
- d = Defaulted

=== Draw ===
First round
1	(South Africa) T Viljoen (South Africa) D Visser	3	6	6
(West Germany) H-D Beutel (West Germany) C Zipf	6	3	2
(West Germany) J Becka (West Germany) K Eberhard	7	6	6
(South Africa) S van der Merwe (South Africa) B Levine	5	7	1
3	(United Kingdom) C Dowdeswell (Hungary) Z Kuhárszky	7	6
(United States) Tres Cushing (United States) A Scheinman	6	3
(Israel) S Glickstein (Israel) S Perkiss	6	6
(West Germany) S Hermann (West Germany) H Theissen	1	4
(South Africa) R Chappell (Sweden) S Svensson	6	7
(South Africa) M Myburg (South Africa) F Punčec	4	6
4	(United States) R Crowley (United States) R Evett	6	6
(Sweden) P Hjertquist (Israel) A Mansdorf	2	3
(West Germany) P Elter (Austria) P Feigl	6	6
(Israel) Shai Puni (Israel) Steve Rosenberg	4	0
(Czechoslovakia) J Granát (Austria) B Pils	1	3
2	(United States) R Meyer (France) G Moretton	6	6

Quarterfinals
1	(South Africa) T Viljoen (South Africa) D Visser	6	7
(West Germany) J Becka (West Germany) K Eberhard	3	6
3	(United Kingdom) C Dowdeswell (Hungary) Z Kuhárszky	7	4	6
(Israel) S Glickstein (Israel) S Perkiss	6	6	3
(South Africa) R Chappell (Sweden) S Svensson	3	6	3
4	(United States) R Crowley (United States) R Evett	6	3	6
(West Germany) P Elter (Austria) P Feigl	w/o
2	(United States) R Meyer (France) G Moretton

Semifinals
1	(South Africa) T Viljoen (South Africa) D Visser	4	4
3	(United Kingdom) C Dowdeswell (Hungary) Z Kuhárszky	6	6
4	(United States) R Crowley (United States) R Evett	6	4	3
(West Germany) P Elter (Austria) P Feigl	4	6	6

Final
3	(United Kingdom) C Dowdeswell (Hungary) Z Kuhárszky	6	7
(West Germany) P Elter (Austria) P Feigl	4	5
