= 1986 Goldstar Cologne – Doubles =

Doubles
- 1986 Goldstar Cologne

Final
- Champions: (New Zealand) Kelly Evernden (United States) Chip Hooper
- Runners-up: (Sweden) Jan Gunnarsson (Sweden) Peter Lundgren
- Score: 6–4, 6–7, 6–3

Details
- Draw: 16
- Seeds: 4

Events
Singles	Doubles
← 1985 ·	Cologne Grand Prix

Alex Antonitsch and Michiel Schapers were the defending champions, but none competed this year.

Kelly Evernden and Chip Hooper won the title by defeating Jan Gunnarsson and Peter Lundgren 6–4, 6–7, 6–3 in the final.

== Seeds ==
1. (Australia) Brad Drewett / (Australia) Mark Edmondson (quarterfinals)
2. (Czechoslovakia) Libor Pimek / (Socialist Federal Republic of Yugoslavia) Slobodan Živojinović (first round)
3. (Australia) Broderick Dyke / (Australia) Wally Masur (quarterfinals)
4. (Israel) Shlomo Glickstein / (Israel) Amos Mansdorf (semifinals)

== Draw ==
=== Key ===
- Q = Qualifier
- WC = Wild card
- LL = Lucky loser
- Alt = Alternate
- SE = Special exempt
- PR = Protected ranking
- ITF = ITF entry
- JE = Junior exempt
- w/o = Walkover
- r = Retired
- d = Defaulted
- SR = Special ranking

=== Draw ===
First round
1	(Australia) B Drewett (Australia) M Edmondson	6	7
(United States) B Levine (Australia) L Warder	4	6
(Czechoslovakia) M Mečíř (Czechoslovakia) M Šrejber	1	5
(New Zealand) K Evernden (United States) C Hooper	6	7
4	(Israel) S Glickstein (Israel) A Mansdorf	5	6	6
(Brazil) N Aerts (Australia) John Werner	7	1	2
(Australia) P Carter (New Zealand) D Lewis	6	7
(Switzerland) S Medem (Czechoslovakia) J Srnensky	3	6
(United States) G Donnelly (Paraguay) F González	6	6
(Australia) C Limberger (Romania) F Segărceanu	3	4
(Sweden) P Hjertquist (Sweden) J Svensson	3	4
3	(Australia) B Dyke (Australia) W Masur	6	6
(West Germany) W Popp (New Zealand) R Simpson	6	7
(Sweden) S Eriksson (Finland) L Palin	4	6
(Sweden) J Gunnarsson (Sweden) P Lundgren	6	7
2	(Czechoslovakia) L Pimek (Socialist Federal Republic of Yugoslavia) S Živojinović	3	6

Quarterfinals
1	(Australia) B Drewett (Australia) M Edmondson	6	6	6
(New Zealand) K Evernden (United States) C Hooper	4	7	7
4	(Israel) S Glickstein (Israel) A Mansdorf	4	6	6
(Australia) P Carter (New Zealand) D Lewis	6	3	4
(United States) G Donnelly (Paraguay) F González	7	7
3	(Australia) B Dyke (Australia) W Masur	6	5
(West Germany) W Popp (New Zealand) R Simpson	6	5	3
(Sweden) J Gunnarsson (Sweden) P Lundgren	3	7	6

Semifinals
(New Zealand) K Evernden (United States) C Hooper	7	4	6
4	(Israel) S Glickstein (Israel) A Mansdorf	6	6	3
(United States) G Donnelly (Paraguay) F González	4	6
(Sweden) J Gunnarsson (Sweden) P Lundgren	6	7

Final
(New Zealand) K Evernden (United States) C Hooper	6	6	6
(Sweden) J Gunnarsson (Sweden) P Lundgren	4	7	3
