= 1985 Cologne Cup – Singles =

Singles
- 1985 Cologne Cup

Final
- Champion: (Sweden) Peter Lundgren
- Runner-up: (India) Ramesh Krishnan
- Score: 6–3, 6–2

Details
- Draw: 32 (3WC/4Q/1SE)
- Seeds: 8

Events
| Singles | Doubles |
| ← 1984 · | Cologne Grand Prix | · 1986 → |

Joakim Nyström was the defending champion, but chose to focus only on the doubles tournament, finishing as runner-up.

Qualifier Peter Lundgren won the title by defeating Ramesh Krishnan 6–3, 6–2 in the final.

== Seeds ==
1. (United States) Kevin Curren (first round)
2. (Czechoslovakia) Miloslav Mečíř (first round)
3. (India) Ramesh Krishnan (final)
4. (Sweden) Jan Gunnarsson (first round)
5. (United States) Tim Wilkison (semifinals)
6. (United States) Larry Stefanki (second round)
7. (Sweden) Kent Carlsson (first round)
8. (Czechoslovakia) Marián Vajda (first round)

== Draw ==
=== Key ===
- Q = Qualifier
- WC = Wild card
- LL = Lucky loser
- Alt = Alternate
- SE = Special exempt
- PR = Protected ranking
- ITF = ITF entry
- JE = Junior exempt
- w/o = Walkover
- r = Retired
- d = Defaulted
- SR = Special ranking

=== Finals ===
Semifinals
(United States) Mark Dickson | 6 | 1 | 5
3 | (India) Ramesh Krishnan | 2 | 6 | 7
5 | (United States) Tim Wilkison | 4 | 6 | 6
Q | (Sweden) Peter Lundgren | 6 | 1 | 7

Final
3 | (India) Ramesh Krishnan | 3 | 2
Q | (Sweden) Peter Lundgren | 6 | 6

=== Top half ===
First round
1/WC | (United States) K Curren | 6 | 6 | 2
(Haiti) R Agénor | 4 | 7 | 6
(United States) J Lapidus | 5 | 4
(Argentina) H de la Peña | 7 | 6
WC | (West Germany) T Meinecke | 4 | 4
Q | (France) T Benhabiles | 6 | 6
(United States) M Dickson | 7 | 7
7 | (Sweden) K Carlsson | 5 | 6
3 | (India) R Krishnan | 6 | 6
Q | (Socialist Federal Republic of Yugoslavia) M Ostoja | 3 | 2
(Czechoslovakia) J Navrátil | 2 | 4
(Sweden) J Svensson | 6 | 6
(Netherlands) M Schapers | 4 | 6 | 2
(United Kingdom) J Lloyd | 6 | 4 | 6
(West Germany) W Popp | 1 | 4
6 | (United States) L Stefanki | 6 | 6

Second round
(Haiti) R Agénor | 6 | 6 | 3
(Argentina) H de la Peña | 2 | 7 | 6
Q | (France) T Benhabiles | 2 | 1
(United States) M Dickson | 6 | 6
3 | (India) R Krishnan | 2 | 6 | 6
(Sweden) J Svensson | 6 | 1 | 0
(United Kingdom) J Lloyd | 7 | 6
6 | (United States) L Stefanki | 6 | 3

Quarterfinals
(Argentina) H de la Peña | 3 | 3
(United States) M Dickson | 6 | 6
3 | (India) R Krishnan | 3 | 6 | 7
(United Kingdom) J Lloyd | 6 | 3 | 5

Semifinals
(United States) M Dickson | 6 | 1 | 5
3 | (India) R Krishnan | 2 | 6 | 7

=== Bottom half ===
First round
5 | (United States) T Wilkison | 6 | 7
(United States) M De Palmer | 3 | 5
(United States) P Fleming | 4 | 2
(United States) C Hooper | 6 | 6
WC | (Czechoslovakia) P Korda | 3 | 4
(United States) L Duncan | 6 | 6
(United States) To Gullikson | 3 | 7 | 6
4 | (Sweden) J Gunnarsson | 6 | 6 | 4
8 | (Czechoslovakia) M Vajda | 3 | 3
Q | (Socialist Federal Republic of Yugoslavia) G Prpić | 6 | 6
Q | (Sweden) P Lundgren | 6 | 5 | 6
(Poland) W Fibak | 3 | 7 | 3
(Italy) C Panatta | 6 | 1 | 4
(Czechoslovakia) P Složil | 4 | 6 | 6
SE | (United Kingdom) J Bates | 7 | 1 | 6
2 | (Czechoslovakia) M Mečíř | 6 | 6 | 4

Second round
5 | (United States) T Wilkison | 6 | 6
(United States) C Hooper | 3 | 0
(United States) L Duncan | 7 | 4 | 3
(United States) To Gullikson | 5 | 6 | 6
Q | (Socialist Federal Republic of Yugoslavia) G Prpić | 6 | 3
Q | (Sweden) P Lundgren | 7 | 6
(Czechoslovakia) P Složil | 2 | 3
SE | (United Kingdom) J Bates | 6 | 6

Quarterfinals
5 | (United States) T Wilkison | 6 | 6
(United States) To Gullikson | 2 | 0
Q | (Sweden) P Lundgren | 6 | 6
SE | (United Kingdom) J Bates | 4 | 0

Semifinals
5 | (United States) T Wilkison | 4 | 6 | 6
Q | (Sweden) P Lundgren | 6 | 1 | 7
