= 1983 Tel Aviv Open =

- Date: October 10–15
- Edition: 4th
- Category: Grand Prix
- Draw: 32S / 16D
- Prize money: $75,000
- Surface: Hard / outdoor
- Location: Ramat HaSharon, Tel Aviv District, Israel
- Venue: Israel Tennis Centers

Champions

Singles
- (United States) Aaron Krickstein

Doubles
- (United Kingdom) Colin Dowdeswell / (Hungary) Zoltán Kuhárszky
- Tel Aviv Open

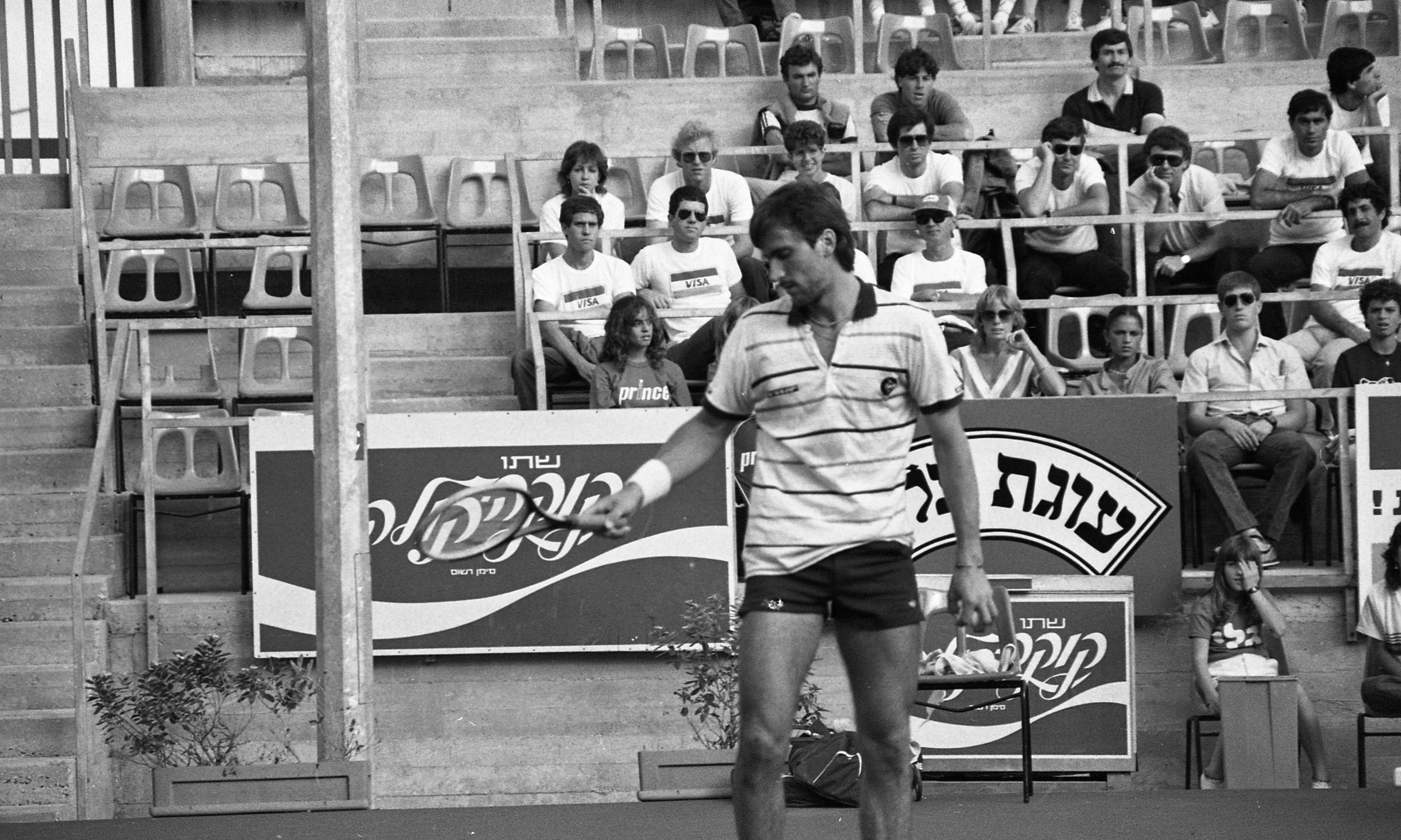
Christoph Zipf in «Grand Prize Tournament» 1983 Tel Aviv Open

The 1983 Tel Aviv Open was a men's tennis tournament played on outdoor hard courts that was part of the 1983 Volvo Grand Prix. It was played at the Israel Tennis Centers in the Tel Aviv District city of Ramat HaSharon, Israel and was held from October 10 to October 15, 1983. It was the fourth edition of the tournament. Unseeded Aaron Krickstein won the singles title to become the youngest ever player to win a singles ATP title.

== Finals ==
=== Singles ===
(United States) Aaron Krickstein defeated (West Germany) Christoph Zipf 7–6, 6–3

- It was Krickstein's only title of the year and the 1st of his career.

=== Doubles ===
(United Kingdom) Colin Dowdeswell / (Hungary) Zoltán Kuhárszky defeated (West Germany) Peter Elter / (Austria) Peter Feigl 6–4, 7–5

- It was Dowdeswell's only title of the year and the 9th of his career. It was Kuharszky's only title of the year and the 2nd of his career.
