= 1986 CA-TennisTrophy – Doubles =

Doubles
- 1986 CA-TennisTrophy

Final
- Champions: (Brazil) Ricardo Acioly (Poland) Wojciech Fibak
- Runners-up: (United States) Brad Gilbert (Socialist Federal Republic of Yugoslavia) Slobodan Živojinović
- Score: Walkover

Details
- Draw: 16
- Seeds: 4

Events
Singles	Doubles
← 1985 ·	Vienna Open	· 1987 →

Mike De Palmer and Gary Donnelly were the defending champions but did not compete that year.

Ricardo Acioly and Wojciech Fibak won the final on a walkover against Brad Gilbert and Slobodan Živojinović.

== Seeds ==
1. (United States) Brad Gilbert / (Socialist Federal Republic of Yugoslavia) Slobodan Živojinović (final, withdrew)
2. (Czechoslovakia) Pavel Složil / (Czechoslovakia) Tomáš Šmíd (quarterfinals)
3. (South Africa) Christo Steyn / (South Africa) Danie Visser (semifinals)
4. (South Africa) Gary Muller / (South Africa) Michael Robertson (semifinals)

== Draw ==
=== Key ===
- Q = Qualifier
- WC = Wild card
- LL = Lucky loser
- Alt = Alternate
- SE = Special exempt
- PR = Protected ranking
- ITF = ITF entry
- JE = Junior exempt
- w/o = Walkover
- r = Retired
- d = Defaulted
- SR = Special ranking

First round
1	(United States) B Gilbert (Socialist Federal Republic of Yugoslavia) S Živojinović	6	7
(Brazil) D Campos (Brazil) C Motta	4	6
(Australia) D Graham (United States) B Testerman	3	4
(Paraguay) F González (United States) T Mayotte	6	6
4	(South Africa) G Muller (South Africa) M Robertson	6	7
(Sweden) S Eriksson (Socialist Federal Republic of Yugoslavia) M Ostoja	3	5
(Sweden) J Gunnarsson (Denmark) M Mortensen	6	7
(United States) M Dickson (Belgium) L Pimek	1	5
(Czechoslovakia) J Navrátil (Netherlands) M Schapers	6	2
(Sweden) P Lundgren (Sweden) J Svensson	7	6
(New Zealand) K Evernden (United States) T Wilkison	7	3	6
3	(South Africa) C Steyn (South Africa) D Visser	5	6	7
(Czechoslovakia) S Birner (Czechoslovakia) M Šrejber	1	6	3
(Brazil) R Acioly (Poland) W Fibak	6	3	6
(Austria) A Antonitsch (Austria) T Muster	7	4	6
2	(Czechoslovakia) P Složil (Czechoslovakia) T Šmíd	6	6	7

Quarterfinals
1	(United States) B Gilbert (Socialist Federal Republic of Yugoslavia) S Živojinović	7	6
(Paraguay) F González (United States) T Mayotte	6	3
4	(South Africa) G Muller (South Africa) M Robertson	7	6
(Sweden) J Gunnarsson (Denmark) M Mortensen	6	1
(Sweden) P Lundgren (Sweden) J Svensson	2	2
3	(South Africa) C Steyn (South Africa) D Visser	6	6
(Brazil) R Acioly (Poland) W Fibak	6	7	6
2	(Czechoslovakia) P Složil (Czechoslovakia) T Šmíd	7	6	2

Semifinals
1	(United States) B Gilbert (Socialist Federal Republic of Yugoslavia) S Živojinović	4	7	6
4	(South Africa) G Muller (South Africa) M Robertson	6	5	4
3	(South Africa) C Steyn (South Africa) D Visser	6	6	6
(Brazil) R Acioly (Poland) W Fibak	7	0	7

Final
1	(United States) B Gilbert (Socialist Federal Republic of Yugoslavia) S Živojinović
(Brazil) R Acioly (Poland) W Fibak	w/o
