= 1986 CA-TennisTrophy – Singles =

Singles
- 1986 CA-TennisTrophy

Final
- Champion: (United States) Brad Gilbert
- Runner-up: (Czechoslovakia) Karel Nováček
- Score: 3–6, 6–3, 7–5, 6–0

Details
- Draw: 32
- Seeds: 8

Events
Singles	Doubles
← 1985 ·	Vienna Open	· 1987 →

Jan Gunnarsson was the defending champion but lost in the semifinals to Karel Nováček.

Brad Gilbert won in the final 3–6, 6–3, 7–5, 6–0 against Nováček.

== Seeds ==
1. (United States) Brad Gilbert (champion)
2. (United States) Tim Mayotte (first round)
3. (Czechoslovakia) Milan Šrejber (first round)
4. (United States) Tim Wilkison (first round)
5. (Socialist Federal Republic of Yugoslavia) Slobodan Živojinović (first round)
6. (Sweden) Jonas Svensson (semifinals)
7. (Italy) Paolo Canè (first round)
8. (Sweden) Peter Lundgren (first round)

== Draw ==
=== Key ===
- Q = Qualifier
- WC = Wild card
- LL = Lucky loser
- Alt = Alternate
- SE = Special exempt
- PR = Protected ranking
- ITF = ITF entry
- JE = Junior exempt
- w/o = Walkover
- r = Retired
- d = Defaulted
- SR = Special ranking

=== Final ===
Semifinals
WC/1	(United States) Brad Gilbert	6	6
6	(Sweden) Jonas Svensson	3	2
(Sweden) Jan Gunnarsson	6	1	6
(Czechoslovakia) Karel Nováček	4	6	7

Final
WC/1	(United States) Brad Gilbert	3	6	7	6
(Czechoslovakia) Karel Nováček	6	3	5	0

=== Section 1 ===
First round
WC/1	(United States) B Gilbert	6	6
Q	(West Germany) P Kühnen	4	0
(West Germany) P Elter	4	7	7
(Socialist Federal Republic of Yugoslavia) M Ostoja	6	6	6
Q	(United States) R Matuszewski	6	6
(Mexico) F Maciel	2	4
(United States) B Testerman	6	6
8	(Sweden) P Lundgren	2	1
4	(United States) T Wilkison	5	1
(West Germany) R Osterthun	7	6
(Czechoslovakia) M Vajda	6	6
(Brazil) C Motta	4	3
(Austria) T Muster	7	3	6
(South Africa) C Steyn	6	6	3
(South Africa) D Visser	3	6	2
6	(Sweden) J Svensson	6	4	6

Second round
WC/1	(United States) B Gilbert	6	6
(West Germany) P Elter	1	3
Q	(United States) R Matuszewski	7	6
(United States) B Testerman	5	4
(West Germany) R Osterthun	6	7
(Czechoslovakia) M Vajda	4	6
(Austria) T Muster	6	4	2
6	(Sweden) J Svensson	3	6	6

Quarterfinals
WC/1	(United States) B Gilbert	4	6	7
Q	(United States) R Matuszewski	6	3	5
(West Germany) R Osterthun	3	6
6	(Sweden) J Svensson	6	7

Semifinals
WC/1	(United States) B Gilbert	6	6
6	(Sweden) J Svensson	3	2

=== Section 2 ===
First round
5	(Socialist Federal Republic of Yugoslavia) S Živojinović	7	3	2
(Poland) W Fibak	5	6	6
(Netherlands) M Schapers	6	6
Q	(Romania) F Segărceanu	2	1
WC	(Austria) A Antonitsch	3	3
(Sweden) J Gunnarsson	6	6
(Sweden) S Eriksson	6	7
3	(Czechoslovakia) M Šrejber	4	5
7	(Italy) P Canè	3	2
(Czechoslovakia) T Šmíd	6	6
(United States) M Dickson	4	6
(Czechoslovakia) K Nováček	6	7
Q	(Sweden) M Gustafsson	4	6	3
(Sweden) C Bergström	6	4	6
WC	(West Germany) M Westphal	2	7	6
2	(United States) T Mayotte	6	6	0

Second round
(Poland) W Fibak	7	3	3
(Netherlands) M Schapers	6	6	6
(Sweden) J Gunnarsson	6	6
(Sweden) S Eriksson	3	4
(Czechoslovakia) T Šmíd	2	2
(Czechoslovakia) K Nováček	6	6
(Sweden) C Bergström	4	6	6
WC	(West Germany) M Westphal	6	4	7

Quarterfinals
(Netherlands) M Schapers	7	6	4
(Sweden) J Gunnarsson	5	7	6
(Czechoslovakia) K Nováček	7	3	6
WC	(West Germany) M Westphal	6	6	4

Semifinals
(Sweden) J Gunnarsson	6	1	6
(Czechoslovakia) K Nováček	4	6	7
