= 1985 Cologne Cup =

German tennis tournament

- Date: 21–27 October
- Edition: 10th
- Category: Grand Prix
- Draw: 32S / 16D
- Prize money: $80,000
- Surface: Carpet / indoor
- Location: Cologne, West Germany

Champions

Singles
- (Sweden) Peter Lundgren

Doubles
- (Austria) Alex Antonitsch / (Netherlands) Michiel Schapers
← 1984 ·	Cologne Grand Prix	· 1986 →

The 1985 Cologne Cup, also known as the Cologne Grand Prix, was a men's tennis tournament played on indoor carpet courts in Cologne, West Germany that was part of the 1985 Nabisco Grand Prix circuit. It was the tenth edition of the tournament and was held from 21 October through 27 October 1985. Unseeded Peter Lundgren won the singles title.

== Finals ==
=== Singles ===
(Sweden) Peter Lundgren defeated (India) Ramesh Krishnan 6–3, 6–2

- It was Lundgren's first singles title of his career.

=== Doubles ===
(Austria) Alex Antonitsch / (Netherlands) Michiel Schapers defeated (Sweden) Jan Gunnarsson / (Sweden) Peter Lundgren 6–4, 7–5
