= 1986 Goldstar Cologne =

German tennis tournament

- Date: 31 March – 6 April
- Edition: 11th
- Category: Grand Prix
- Draw: 32S / 16D
- Prize money: $100,000
- Surface: Carpet / indoor
- Location: Cologne, West Germany

Champions

Singles
- (Sweden) Jonas Svensson

Doubles
- (New Zealand) Kelly Evernden / (United States) Chip Hooper
- Cologne Grand Prix

The 1986 Goldstar Cologne, also known as the Cologne Grand Prix, was a men's tennis tournament played on indoor carpet courts in Cologne, West Germany that was part of the 1986 Nabisco Grand Prix circuit. It was the 11th and last edition of the tournament and was held from 31 March through 6 April 1986. Unseeded Jonas Svensson won the singles title.

== Finals ==
=== Singles ===
(Sweden) Jonas Svensson defeated (Sweden) Stefan Eriksson 6–7, 6–2, 6–2

- It was Svensson's first singles title of his career.

=== Doubles ===
(New Zealand) Kelly Evernden / (United States) Chip Hooper defeated (Sweden) Jan Gunnarsson / (Sweden) Peter Lundgren 6–4, 6–7, 6–3
