= 1985 Cologne Cup – Doubles =

Doubles
- 1985 Cologne Cup

Final
- Champions: (Austria) Alex Antonitsch (Netherlands) Michiel Schapers
- Runners-up: (Sweden) Jan Gunnarsson (Sweden) Peter Lundgren
- Score: 6–4, 7–5

Details
- Draw: 16 (1WC)
- Seeds: 4

Events
Singles	Doubles
- Cologne Grand Prix

Wojciech Fibak and Sandy Mayer were the defending champions, but Mayer did not compete this year. Fibak teamed up with Pavel Složil and lost in the quarterfinals to Jan Gunnarsson and Peter Lundgren.

Alex Antonitsch and Michiel Schapers won the title by defeating Gunnarsson and Lundgren 6–4, 7–5 in the final.

== Seeds ==
1. (Poland) Wojciech Fibak / (Czechoslovakia) Pavel Složil (quarterfinals)
2. (United States) Mark Dickson / (United States) Tim Wilkison (quarterfinals)
3. (United States) Tim Gullikson / (United States) Tom Gullikson (first round)
4. (South Africa) Christo Steyn / (South Africa) Danie Visser (quarterfinals)

== Draw ==
Key

- Q = Qualifier
- WC = Wild card
- LL = Lucky loser
- Alt = Alternate
- ITF = ITF entry
- PR = Protected ranking
- SR = Special ranking
- SE = Special exempt
- JE = Junior exempt
- JR = Junior Accelerator Programme entrant
- CO = College Accelerator Programme entrant
- NG = Next Gen Accelerator Program entrant
- w/o = Walkover
- r = Retired
- d = Defaulted

=== Draw ===
First round
1	(Poland) W Fibak (Czechoslovakia) P Složil	6	6
(United States) M De Palmer (United States) L Stefanki	4	4
(Sweden) J Gunnarsson (Sweden) P Lundgren	4	7	7
(West Germany) T Meinecke (West Germany) W Popp	6	5	5
4	(South Africa) C Steyn (South Africa) D Visser	6	6
WC	(Czechoslovakia) M Mečíř (Czechoslovakia) J Navrátil	3	4
(Australia) R Barlow (Australia) C Limberger	1	6
(Sweden) J Svensson (Sweden) P Svensson	6	7
(Republic of Ireland) M Doyle (West Germany) U Riglewski	6	4
(United States) C Hooper (Socialist Federal Republic of Yugoslavia) M Ostoja	7	6
(United Kingdom) J Bates (South Africa) M Robertson	7	6
3	(United States) Ti Gullikson (United States) To Gullikson	6	4
(Austria) A Antonitsch (Netherlands) M Schapers	6	7
(India) A Amritraj (United Kingdom) J Smith	4	6
(Sweden) P Hjertquist (Sweden) S Simonsson	3	4
2	(United States) M Dickson (United States) T Wilkison	6	6

Quarterfinals
1	(Poland) W Fibak (Czechoslovakia) P Složil	2	7	3
(Sweden) J Gunnarsson (Sweden) P Lundgren	6	6	6
4	(South Africa) C Steyn (South Africa) D Visser	1	6	2
(Sweden) J Svensson (Sweden) P Svensson	6	4	6
(United States) C Hooper (Socialist Federal Republic of Yugoslavia) M Ostoja	6	3
(United Kingdom) J Bates (South Africa) M Robertson	7	6
(Austria) A Antonitsch (Netherlands) M Schapers	7	7
2	(United States) M Dickson (United States) T Wilkison	6	6

Semifinals
(Sweden) J Gunnarsson (Sweden) P Lundgren	6	7
(Sweden) J Svensson (Sweden) P Svensson	3	6
(United Kingdom) J Bates (South Africa) M Robertson	6	4
(Austria) A Antonitsch (Netherlands) M Schapers	7	6

Final
(Sweden) J Gunnarsson (Sweden) P Lundgren	4	5
(Austria) A Antonitsch (Netherlands) M Schapers	6	7
