= 1986 Mercedes Cup – Singles =

Singles
- 1986 Mercedes Cup

Final
- Champion: (Argentina) Martín Jaite
- Runner-up: (Sweden) Jonas Svensson
- Score: 7–5, 6–2

Details
- Draw: 48 (4WC/6Q)
- Seeds: 16

Events
Singles	Doubles
- Stuttgart Open

Ivan Lendl was the defending champion, but he chose to rest after winning the US Open the previous week.

Third-seeded Martín Jaite won the title by defeating Jonas Svensson 7–5, 6–2 in the final.

== Seeds ==
All seeds received a bye to the second round.

1. (Ecuador) Andrés Gómez (semifinals)
2. (Sweden) Mikael Pernfors (quarterfinals)
3. (Argentina) Martín Jaite (champion)
4. (Spain) Emilio Sánchez (second round)
5. (Argentina) Guillermo Vilas (quarterfinals)
6. (West Germany) Eric Jelen (second round)
7. (Socialist Federal Republic of Yugoslavia) Slobodan Živojinović (second round)
8. (Switzerland) Jakob Hlasek (third round)
9. (Czechoslovakia) Tomáš Šmíd (second round)
10. (Sweden) Ulf Stenlund (semifinals)
11. (Australia) Paul McNamee (third round)
12. (Sweden) Jonas Svensson (final)
13. (Uruguay) Diego Pérez (third round)
14. (Austria) Thomas Muster (third round)
15. (Sweden) Jan Gunnarsson (third round)
16. (West Germany) Damir Keretić (third round)

== Draw ==
Key

- Q = Qualifier
- WC = Wild card
- LL = Lucky loser
- Alt = Alternate
- ITF = ITF entry
- PR = Protected ranking
- SR = Special ranking
- SE = Special exempt
- JE = Junior exempt
- JR = Junior Accelerator Programme entrant
- CO = College Accelerator Programme entrant
- NG = Next Gen Accelerator Program entrant
- w/o = Walkover
- r = Retired
- d = Defaulted

=== Finals ===
Quarterfinals
1	(Ecuador) Andrés Gómez	7	2
Q	(Spain) David de Miguel	5	0^{r}
(Austria) Horst Skoff	4	0
12	(Sweden) Jonas Svensson	6	6
5	(Argentina) Guillermo Vilas	2	2
3	(Argentina) Martín Jaite	6	6
10	(Sweden) Ulf Stenlund	5	6	6
2	(Sweden) Mikael Pernfors	7	2	2

Semifinals
1	(Ecuador) Andrés Gómez	3	6
12	(Sweden) Jonas Svensson	6	7
3	(Argentina) Martín Jaite	4	6	6
10	(Sweden) Ulf Stenlund	6	3	3

Final
12	(Sweden) Jonas Svensson	5	2
3	(Argentina) Martín Jaite	7	6

=== Top half ===
==== Section 1 ====
First round
(West Germany) P Elter	6	7
(Sweden) J Carlsson	3	6
(Sweden) H Sundström	6	4	6
WC	(United States) G Mayer	2	6	3
(Sweden) C Bergström	7	6
(Spain) S Casal	6	3
Q	(Spain) D de Miguel	6	6
WC	(West Germany) CU Steeb	4	3

Second round
1	(Ecuador) A Gómez	6	7
(West Germany) P Elter	3	5
(Sweden) H Sundström	2	6
16	(West Germany) D Keretić	6	7
9	(Czechoslovakia) T Šmíd	3	2
(Sweden) C Bergström	6	6
Q	(Spain) D de Miguel	6	4	6
7	(Socialist Federal Republic of Yugoslavia) S Živojinović	3	6	4

Third round
1	(Ecuador) A Gómez	6	6
16	(West Germany) D Keretić	3	3
(Sweden) C Bergström	1	1
Q	(Spain) D de Miguel	6	6

Quarterfinals
1	(Ecuador) A Gómez	7	2
Q	(Spain) D de Miguel	5	0^{r}

==== Section 2 ====
First round
(Sweden) S Eriksson	3	3
(Austria) H Skoff	6	6
(New Zealand) B Derlin	6	6
(West Germany) A Stepanek	2	2
Q	(Chile) H Gildemeister	2	4
(Chile) R Acuña	6	6
Q	(Iran) M Bahrami	1	2
(Brazil) C Motta	6	6

Second round
4	(Spain) E Sánchez	1	1
(Austria) H Skoff	6	6
(New Zealand) B Derlin	6	3	2
13	(Uruguay) D Pérez	3	6	6
12	(Sweden) J Svensson	6	6
(Chile) R Acuña	3	3
(Brazil) C Motta	6	6	7
6	(West Germany) E Jelen	1	7	5

Third round
(Austria) H Skoff	6	6
13	(Uruguay) D Pérez	3	3
12	(Sweden) J Svensson	6	6
(Brazil) C Motta	2	1

Quarterfinals
(Austria) H Skoff	4	0
12	(Sweden) J Svensson	6	6

=== Bottom half ===
==== Section 3 ====
First round
Q	(West Germany) T Theine	1	6	3
(South Africa) B Moir	6	3	6
Q	(West Germany) Rüdiger Benz	3	6	2
(West Germany) T Meinecke	6	2	6
(West Germany) H Schwaier	6	7	6
WC	(West Germany) U Riglewski	7	6	2
(South Africa) M Robertson	4	4
(Paraguay) V Pecci	6	6

Second round
5	(Argentina) G Vilas	6	6
(South Africa) B Moir	1	3
(West Germany) T Meinecke	3	2
11	(Australia) P McNamee	6	6
14	(Austria) T Muster	6	6
(West Germany) H Schwaier	3	4
(Paraguay) V Pecci	6	4	0
3	(Argentina) M Jaite	3	6	6

Third round
5	(Argentina) G Vilas	6	6
11	(Australia) P McNamee	1	3
14	(Austria) T Muster	1	6
3	(Argentina) M Jaite	6	7

Quarterfinals
5	(Argentina) G Vilas	2	2
3	(Argentina) M Jaite	6	6

==== Section 4 ====
First round
(West Germany) M Westphal	3	6	3
Q	(Sweden) M Tideman	6	2	6
(West Germany) R Osterthun	6	6	1
(United Kingdom) J Bates	2	7	6
(United States) B Teacher	4	6
WC	(Socialist Federal Republic of Yugoslavia) I Šarić	6	7
(United States) J Levine	6	6
(Socialist Federal Republic of Yugoslavia) B Orešar	3	2

Second round
8	(Switzerland) J Hlasek	6	4	7
Q	(Sweden) M Tideman	2	6	6
(United Kingdom) J Bates	6	3
10	(Sweden) U Stenlund	7	6
15	(Sweden) J Gunnarsson	7	6
WC	(Socialist Federal Republic of Yugoslavia) I Šarić	6	3
(United States) J Levine	1	3
2	(Sweden) M Pernfors	6	6

Third round
8	(Switzerland) J Hlasek	4	4
10	(Sweden) U Stenlund	6	6
15	(Sweden) J Gunnarsson	4	2
2	(Sweden) M Pernfors	6	6

Quarterfinals
10	(Sweden) U Stenlund	5	6	6
2	(Sweden) M Pernfors	7	2	2
