= 1986 Goldstar Cologne – Singles =

Singles
- 1986 Goldstar Cologne

Final
- Champion: (Sweden) Jonas Svensson
- Runner-up: (Sweden) Stefan Eriksson
- Score: 6–7, 6–2, 6–2

Details
- Draw: 32 (3WC/4Q)
- Seeds: 8

Events
Singles	Doubles
← 1985 ·	Cologne Grand Prix

Peter Lundgren was the defending champion, but lost in the second round to Karel Nováček.

Jonas Svensson won the title by defeating Stefan Eriksson 6–7, 6–2, 6–2 in the final.

== Seeds ==
1. (Sweden) Anders Järryd (semifinals)
2. (Socialist Federal Republic of Yugoslavia) Slobodan Živojinović (second round)
3. (Sweden) Peter Lundgren (second round)
4. (Czechoslovakia) Milan Šrejber (first round)
5. (Australia) Broderick Dyke (first round)
6. (Sweden) Jan Gunnarsson (second round)
7. (Czechoslovakia) Libor Pimek (quarterfinals)
8. (Netherlands) Michiel Schapers (first round)

== Draw ==
=== Key ===
- Q = Qualifier
- WC = Wild card
- LL = Lucky loser
- Alt = Alternate
- SE = Special exempt
- PR = Protected ranking
- ITF = ITF entry
- JE = Junior exempt
- w/o = Walkover
- r = Retired
- d = Defaulted
- SR = Special ranking

=== Finals ===
Semifinals
1	(Sweden) Anders Järryd	5	1
(Sweden) Stefan Eriksson	7	6
(Czechoslovakia) Karel Nováček	3	6
(Sweden) Jonas Svensson	6	7

Final
(Sweden) Stefan Eriksson	7	2	2
(Sweden) Jonas Svensson	6	6	6

=== Top half ===
First round
1	(Sweden) A Järryd	2	6	6
Q	(West Germany) H Rittersbacher	6	4	4
(Paraguay) F González	6	3
(United States) B Green	7	6
(West Germany) W Popp	3	2
Q	(United States) G Donnelly	6	6
(Australia) M Edmondson	6	6
8	(Netherlands) M Schapers	4	4
4/WC	(Czechoslovakia) M Šrejber	4	6
(Australia) W Masur	6	7
Q	(Socialist Federal Republic of Yugoslavia) M Ostoja	3	4
(Sweden) S Eriksson	6	6
Q	(Australia) P Carter	3	4
(United States) C Hooper	6	6
(Israel) S Perkiss	6	6
5	(Australia) B Dyke	1	4

Second round
1	(Sweden) A Järryd	2	7	6
(United States) B Green	6	6	2
Q	(United States) G Donnelly	6	6
(Australia) M Edmondson	1	2
(Australia) W Masur	4	6	3
(Sweden) S Eriksson	6	1	6
(United States) C Hooper	6	1	6
(Israel) S Perkiss	4	6	4

Quarterfinals
1	(Sweden) A Järryd	6	3	6
Q	(United States) G Donnelly	2	6	3
(Sweden) S Eriksson	3	6	6
(United States) C Hooper	6	0	4

Semifinals
1	(Sweden) A Järryd	5	1
(Sweden) S Eriksson	7	6

=== Bottom half ===
First round
6	(Sweden) J Gunnarsson	6	6
(Romania) F Segărceanu	3	4
(New Zealand) K Evernden	5	5
(Israel) A Mansdorf	7	7
(Israel) S Glickstein	3	3
(Czechoslovakia) K Nováček	6	6
(Australia) B Drewett	4	2
3	(Sweden) P Lundgren	6	6
7	(Czechoslovakia) L Pimek	3	6	6
(New Zealand) R Simpson	6	4	4
(Brazil) N Aerts	5	5
WC	(West Germany) U Riglewski	7	7
(Sweden) J Svensson	6	6
WC	(West Germany) E Jelen	3	2
(Austria) T Muster	3	2
2	(Socialist Federal Republic of Yugoslavia) S Živojinović	6	6

Second round
6	(Sweden) J Gunnarsson	2	3
(Israel) A Mansdorf	6	6
(Czechoslovakia) K Nováček	6	6
3	(Sweden) P Lundgren	4	1
7	(Czechoslovakia) L Pimek	7	5	6
WC	(West Germany) U Riglewski	6	7	4
(Sweden) J Svensson	6	6
2	(Socialist Federal Republic of Yugoslavia) S Živojinović	2	3

Quarterfinals
(Israel) A Mansdorf	6	6	4
(Czechoslovakia) K Nováček	7	2	6
7	(Czechoslovakia) L Pimek	3	4
(Sweden) J Svensson	6	6

Semifinals
(Czechoslovakia) K Nováček	3	6
(Sweden) J Svensson	6	7
