= 1981 Lacoste Cup =

German tennis tournament

- Date: 26 October – 1 November
- Edition: 6th
- Category: Grand Prix
- Draw: 32S / 16D
- Prize money: $75,000
- Surface: Carpet / indoor
- Location: Cologne, West Germany
- Venue: Sporthalle

Champions

Singles
- (Czechoslovakia) Ivan Lendl

Doubles
- (United States) Sandy Mayer / (South Africa) Frew McMillan
| ← 1980 · | Cologne Grand Prix | · 1982 → |

The 1981 Lacoste Cup, also known as the Cologne Cup, was a men's tennis tournament played on indoor carpet courts at the Sporthalle in Cologne, West Germany that was part of the 1981 Volvo Grand Prix circuit. It was the sixth edition of the tournament and was held from 26 October through 1 November 1981. First-seeded Ivan Lendl won the singles title.

== Finals ==
=== Singles ===
(Czechoslovakia) Ivan Lendl defeated (United States) Sandy Mayer 6–3, 6–3

- It was Lendl's 8th singles title of the year and the 15th of his career.

=== Doubles ===
(United States) Sandy Mayer / (South Africa) Frew McMillan defeated (Czechoslovakia) Jan Kodeš / (West Germany) Karl Meiler 6–0, 6–4
