= 1986 Mercedes Cup – Doubles =

Doubles
- 1986 Mercedes Cup

Final
- Champions: (Chile) Hans Gildemeister (Ecuador) Andrés Gómez
- Runners-up: (Iran) Mansour Bahrami (Uruguay) Diego Pérez
- Score: 6–4, 6–3

Details
- Draw: 24 (2WC)
- Seeds: 8

Events
Singles	Doubles
- Stuttgart Open

Ivan Lendl and Tomáš Šmíd were the defending champions but Lendl did not compete this year, choosing to rest after winning the US Open the previous week. Šmíd teamed up with Paul McNamee and lost in the semifinals to Hans Gildemeister and Andrés Gómez.

Gildemeister and Gómez won the title by defeating Mansour Bahrami and Diego Pérez 6–4, 6–3 in the final.

== Seeds ==
All seeds received a bye to the second round.

1. (Chile) Hans Gildemeister / (Ecuador) Andrés Gómez (champions)
2. (Spain) Sergio Casal / (Spain) Emilio Sánchez (second round)
3. (Australia) Paul McNamee / (Czechoslovakia) Tomáš Šmíd (semifinals)
4. (United States) Sherwood Stewart / (Australia) Kim Warwick (second round)
5. (Chile) Ricardo Acuña / (Switzerland) Jakob Hlasek (semifinals)
6. (Sweden) Jan Gunnarsson / (Denmark) Michael Mortensen (quarterfinals)
7. (United States) Tim Gullikson / (United States) Tom Gullikson (second round)
8. (New Zealand) Bruce Derlin / (United States) Blaine Willenborg (quarterfinals)

== Draw ==
Key

- Q = Qualifier
- WC = Wild card
- LL = Lucky loser
- Alt = Alternate
- ITF = ITF entry
- PR = Protected ranking
- SR = Special ranking
- SE = Special exempt
- JE = Junior exempt
- JR = Junior Accelerator Programme entrant
- CO = College Accelerator Programme entrant
- NG = Next Gen Accelerator Program entrant
- w/o = Walkover
- r = Retired
- d = Defaulted

=== Finals ===
Semifinals
1	(Chile) Hans Gildemeister (Ecuador) Andrés Gómez	1	7	7
3	(Australia) Paul McNamee (Czechoslovakia) Tomáš Šmíd	6	6	6
5	(Chile) Ricardo Acuña (Switzerland) Jakob Hlasek	6	6
(Iran) Mansour Bahrami (Uruguay) Diego Pérez	7	7

Final
1	(Chile) Hans Gildemeister (Ecuador) Andrés Gómez	6	6
(Iran) Mansour Bahrami (Uruguay) Diego Pérez	4	3

=== Top half ===
First round
(Israel) S Glickstein (South Africa) M Robertson	6	7
(Sweden) M Pernfors (Sweden) M Tideman	2	6
(United Kingdom) J Bates (United States) C Dunk	6	6
(Austria) T Muster (Finland) L Palin	3	2
(United States) L Bourne (Republic of Ireland) M Doyle	6	6
(Germany) T Meinecke (Germany) R Osterthun	7	7
(Spain) J Colás (Spain) D de Miguel	3	6	6
(Brazil) C Motta (Paraguay) V Pecci	6	2	4

Second round
1	(Chile) H Gildemeister (Ecuador) A Gómez	7	6
(Israel) S Glickstein (South Africa) M Robertson	5	3
(United Kingdom) J Bates (United States) C Dunk	4	6	4
8	(New Zealand) B Derlin (United States) B Willenborg	6	3	6
3	(Australia) P McNamee (Czechoslovakia) T Šmíd	2	6	6
(Germany) T Meinecke (Germany) R Osterthun	6	2	3
(Spain) J Colás (Spain) D de Miguel	2	4
6	(Sweden) J Gunnarsson (Denmark) M Mortensen	6	6

Quarterfinals
1	(Chile) H Gildemeister (Ecuador) A Gómez	6	6	7
8	(New Zealand) B Derlin (United States) B Willenborg	2	7	6
3	(Australia) P McNamee (Czechoslovakia) T Šmíd	7	7
6	(Sweden) J Gunnarsson (Denmark) M Mortensen	5	6

Semifinals
1	(Chile) H Gildemeister (Ecuador) A Gómez	1	7	7
3	(Australia) P McNamee (Czechoslovakia) T Šmíd	6	6	6

=== Bottom half ===
First round
WC	(West Germany) D Keretić (West Germany) CU Steeb	6	6
(United States) J Levine (South Africa) B Moir	2	3
(West Germany) E Jelen (Socialist Federal Republic of Yugoslavia) S Živojinović	6	6
(Sweden) J Carlsson (Sweden) S Eriksson	3	4
(Sweden) S Simonsson (Sweden) S Svensson	2	2
(Brazil) J Soares (United States) D Tarr	6	6
(Iran) M Bahrami (Uruguay) D Pérez	6	6
WC	(United States) G Mayer (United States) S Mayer	2	4

Second round
5	(Chile) R Acuña (Switzerland) J Hlasek	7	4	6
WC	(West Germany) D Keretić (West Germany) CU Steeb	6	6	4
(West Germany) E Jelen (Socialist Federal Republic of Yugoslavia) S Živojinović	6	6
4	(United States) S Stewart (Australia) K Warwick	2	4
7	(United States) Ti Gullikson (United States) To Gullikson	6	6	3
(Brazil) J Soares (United States) D Tarr	7	3	6
(Iran) M Bahrami (Uruguay) D Pérez	6	3	6
2	(Spain) S Casal (Spain) E Sánchez	4	6	2

Quarterfinals
5	(Chile) R Acuña (Switzerland) J Hlasek	6	6
(West Germany) E Jelen (Socialist Federal Republic of Yugoslavia) S Živojinović	1	4
(Brazil) J Soares (United States) D Tarr	4	3
(Iran) M Bahrami (Uruguay) D Pérez	6	6

Semifinals
5	(Chile) R Acuña (Switzerland) J Hlasek	6	6
(Iran) M Bahrami (Uruguay) D Pérez	7	7
