= 1986 Mercedes Cup =

- Date: 8–14 September
- Edition: 9th
- Category: Grand Prix
- Draw: 48S / 24D
- Prize money: $162,500
- Surface: Clay / outdoor
- Location: Stuttgart, West Germany
- Venue: Tennis Club Weissenhof

Champions

Singles
- (Argentina) Martín Jaite

Doubles
- (Chile) Hans Gildemeister / (Ecuador) Andrés Gómez
- Stuttgart Open

The 1986 Mercedes Cup, was a men's tennis tournament played on outdoor clay courts and held at the Tennis Club Weissenhof in Stuttgart, West Germany that was part of the 1986 Grand Prix circuit. It was the ninth edition of the tournament and was held from 8 September until 14 September 1986. Third-seeded Martín Jaite won the singles title.

== Finals ==
=== Singles ===
(Argentina) Martín Jaite defeated (Sweden) Jonas Svensson, 7–5, 6–2

- It was Jaite's 2nd singles title of the year and the 3rd of his career.

=== Doubles ===
(Chile) Hans Gildemeister / (Ecuador) Andrés Gómez defeated (Iran) Mansour Bahrami / (Uruguay) Diego Pérez, 6–4, 6–3
