= 1991 Copenhagen Open – Doubles =

Doubles
- 1991 Copenhagen Open

Final
- Champions: (Australia) Todd Woodbridge (Australia) Mark Woodforde
- Runners-up: (Iran) Mansour Bahrami (Soviet Union) Andrei Olhovskiy
- Score: 6–3, 6–1

Details
- Draw: 16
- Seeds: 4

Events
| Singles | Doubles |
| ← 1973 · | Copenhagen Open | · 1992 → |

No defending champions were officially declared as the last edition dates back to 1973, which was won by Tom Gorman and Erik van Dillen.

Todd Woodbridge and Mark Woodforde won the title by defeating Mansour Bahrami and Andrei Olhovskiy 6–3, 6–1 in the final.

== Seeds ==
1. (Australia) Todd Woodbridge / (Australia) Mark Woodforde (champions)
2. (United States) Charles Beckman / (Australia) David Macpherson (semifinals)
3. (Czechoslovakia) Cyril Suk / (Czechoslovakia) Daniel Vacek (semifinals)
4. (Czechoslovakia) Karel Nováček / (Czechoslovakia) Libor Pimek (first round)

== Draw ==
=== Key ===
- Q = Qualifier
- WC = Wild card
- LL = Lucky loser
- Alt = Alternate
- SE = Special exempt
- PR = Protected ranking
- ITF = ITF entry
- JE = Junior exempt
- w/o = Walkover
- r = Retired
- d = Defaulted
- SR = Special ranking

=== Draw ===
First round
1 | (Australia) T Woodbridge (Australia) M Woodforde | 6 | 6
(Netherlands) HJ Davids (Italy) S Pescosolido | 3 | 4
WC | (Denmark) F Fetterlein (Denmark) M Tauson | 3 | 4
(Sweden) H Holm (Sweden) J Svensson | 6 | 6
3 | (Czechoslovakia) C Suk (Czechoslovakia) D Vacek | 6
(Austria) A Antonitsch (West Germany) P Kühnen | 3 | r
(Czechoslovakia) S Doseděl (Czechoslovakia) D Rikl | 2 | 7 | 4
(Sweden) A Järryd (Denmark) M Mortensen | 6 | 6 | 6
Q | (Soviet Union) A Chesnokov (Spain) JF Altur | 2 | 3
(Iran) M Bahrami (Soviet Union) A Olhovskiy | 6 | 6
(United Kingdom) A Castle (Sweden) P Henricsson | 6 | 1 | 6
4 | (Czechoslovakia) K Nováček (Czechoslovakia) L Pimek | 4 | 6 | 3
(Netherlands) J Eltingh (Venezuela) A Mora | 3 | 6 | 6
(Czechoslovakia) J Čihák (Czechoslovakia) B Stankovič | 6 | 3 | 7
(Sweden) J Gunnarsson (Netherlands) T Nijssen | 4 | 4
2 | (United States) C Beckman (Australia) D Macpherson | 6 | 6

Quarterfinals
1 | (Australia) T Woodbridge (Australia) M Woodforde | 7 | 7
(Sweden) H Holm (Sweden) J Svensson | 6 | 6
3 | (Czechoslovakia) C Suk (Czechoslovakia) D Vacek | 6 | 3 | 6
(Sweden) A Järryd (Denmark) M Mortensen | 3 | 6 | 3
(Iran) M Bahrami (Soviet Union) A Olhovskiy | 6 | 6
(United Kingdom) A Castle (Sweden) P Henricsson | 3 | 4
(Czechoslovakia) J Čihák (Czechoslovakia) B Stankovič | 2 | 7 | 4
2 | (United States) C Beckman (Australia) D Macpherson | 6 | 5 | 6

Semifinals
1 | (Australia) T Woodbridge (Australia) M Woodforde | 7 | 6
3 | (Czechoslovakia) C Suk (Czechoslovakia) D Vacek | 6 | 1
(Iran) M Bahrami (Soviet Union) A Olhovskiy | 4 | 7 | 7
2 | (United States) C Beckman (Australia) D Macpherson | 6 | 6 | 6

Final
1 | (Australia) T Woodbridge (Australia) M Woodforde | 6 | 6
(Iran) M Bahrami (Soviet Union) A Olhovskiy | 3 | 1
