= 1980 Lacoste Cup =

German tennis tournament

- Date: 27 October – 2 November
- Edition: 5th
- Category: Grand Prix
- Draw: 32S / 16D
- Prize money: $75,000
- Surface: Carpet / indoor
- Location: Cologne, West Germany

Champions

Singles
- (United States) Bob Lutz

Doubles
- (Zimbabwe) Andrew Pattison / (South Africa) Bernard Mitton
- Cologne Grand Prix

The 1980 Lacoste Cup, also known as the Cologne Grand Prix, was a men's tennis tournament played on indoor carpet courts in Cologne, West Germany that was part of the 1980 Volvo Grand Prix circuit. It was the fifth edition of the tournament and was held from 27 October through 2 November 1980. Fourth-seeded Bob Lutz won the singles title.

== Finals ==
=== Singles ===
(United States) Bob Lutz defeated (United States) Nick Saviano 6–4, 6–0

- It was Lutz' 3rd singles title of the year and the 11th and last of his career.

=== Doubles ===
(Zimbabwe) Andrew Pattison / (South Africa) Bernard Mitton defeated (Czechoslovakia) Jan Kodeš / (Czechoslovakia) Tomáš Šmíd 6–4, 6–1
