= 1991 Copenhagen Open =

Men's tennis tournament

- Date: 4–10 March
- Edition: 3rd
- Category: World Series
- Draw: 32S / 16D
- Prize money: $125,000
- Surface: Carpet / indoor
- Location: Copenhagen, Denmark

Champions

Singles
- (Sweden) Jonas Svensson (tennis)

Doubles
- (Sweden) Nicklas Kulti / (Sweden) Jonas Svensson (tennis)
← 1976 ·	Copenhagen Open	· 1992 →

The 1991 Copenhagen Open was a men's tennis tournament played on indoor carpet courts in Copenhagen, Denmark that was part of the World Series of the 1991 ATP Tour. It was the sixth edition of the tournament and was held from 4 March until 10 March 1991. First-seeded Jonas Svensson won the singles title.

== Finals ==
=== Singles ===
(Sweden) Jonas Svensson defeated (Sweden) Anders Järryd, 6–7^{(5–7)}, 6–2, 6–2

- It was Svensson's only singles title of the year and the 5th and last of his career.

=== Doubles ===
(Australia) Todd Woodbridge / (Australia) Mark Woodforde defeated (Iran) Mansour Bahrami / (Soviet Union) Andrei Olhovskiy, 6–3, 6–1
