= 1987 CA-TennisTrophy =

Tennis tournament

- Date: 19–26 October
- Edition: 13th
- Category: Grand Prix
- Draw: 32S / 16D
- Prize money: $125,000
- Surface: Carpet / indoor
- Location: Vienna, Austria
- Venue: Wiener Stadthalle

Champions

Singles
- (Sweden) Jonas Svensson

Doubles
- (United States) Mel Purcell / (United States) Tim Wilkison
- Vienna Open

The 1987 CA-TennisTrophy was a men's tennis tournament played on indoor carpet courts at the Wiener Stadthalle in Vienna, Austria that was part of the 1987 Nabisco Grand Prix. It was the 13th edition of the tournament and took place from 19 October until 26 October 1987. Jonas Svensson won the singles title.

== Finals ==
=== Singles ===
(Sweden) Jonas Svensson defeated (Israel) Amos Mansdorf, 1–6, 1–6, 6–2, 6–3, 7–5

- It was Svensson's 2nd title of the year and the 3rd of his career.

=== Doubles ===
(United States) Mel Purcell / (United States) Tim Wilkison defeated (Spain) Emilio Sánchez / (Spain) Javier Sánchez, 6–3, 7–5

- It was Purcell's only title of the year and the 7th of his career. It was Wilkison's only title of the year and the 12th of his career.
