= 1982 Cologne Cup =

German tennis tournament

- Date: 25–31 October
- Edition: 7th
- Category: Grand Prix
- Draw: 32S / 16D
- Prize money: $75,000
- Surface: Carpet / indoor
- Location: Cologne, West Germany
- Venue: Sporthalle

Champions

Singles
- (South Africa) Kevin Curren

Doubles
- (Uruguay) José Luis Damiani / (Brazil) Carlos Kirmayr
← 1981 ·	Cologne Grand Prix	· 1983 →

The 1982 Cologne Cup, also known as the Cologne Grand Prix, was a men's tennis tournament played on indoor carpet courts at the Sporthalle in Cologne, West Germany that was part of the 1982 Volvo Grand Prix circuit. It was the seventh edition of the tournament and was held from 25 October through 31 October 1982. Fourth-seeded Kevin Curren won the singles title.

== Finals ==
=== Singles ===
(South Africa) Kevin Curren defeated (Israel) Shlomo Glickstein 2–6, 6–2, 6–3

- It was Curren's only singles title of the year and the 2nd of his career.

=== Doubles ===
(Uruguay) José Luis Damiani / (Brazil) Carlos Kirmayr defeated (West Germany) Hans-Dieter Beutel / (West Germany) Christoph Zipf 6–2, 3–6, 7–5
