= 1987 CA-TennisTrophy – Doubles =

Doubles
- 1987 CA-TennisTrophy
- 1986 Champions: (Brazil) Ricardo Acioly (Poland) Wojciech Fibak

Final
- Champions: (United States) Mel Purcell (United States) Tim Wilkison
- Runners-up: (Spain) Emilio Sánchez (Spain) Javier Sánchez
- Score: 6–3, 7–5

Details
- Draw: 16
- Seeds: 4

Events
Singles	Doubles
- CA-TennisTrophy

The 1987 CA-TennisTrophy – Doubles was an event of the 1987 CA-TennisTrophy tennis tournament played on indoor hard courts at the Wiener Stadthalle in Vienna, Austria from 19 October until 26 October 1987. The draw consisted of 16 teams of which four were seeded. Ricardo Acioly and Wojciech Fibak were the defending champions but they competed with different partners that year, Acioly with Luiz Mattar and Fibak with Henri Leconte. Acioly and Mattar lost in the first round to Mark Dickson and Jorge Lozano, as did Fibak and Leconte to Petr Korda and Diego Nargiso.

The unseeded team of Mel Purcell and Tim Wilkison won the doubles title after a 6–3, 7–5 victory in the final against the fourth-seeded team of Emilio Sánchez and Javier Sánchez.

== Seeds ==
Champion seeds are indicated in bold text while text in italics indicates the round in which those seeds were eliminated.

1. (Sweden) Jan Gunnarsson / (Sweden) Anders Järryd (quarterfinals)
2. (Czechoslovakia) Tomáš Šmíd / (Sweden) Jonas Svensson (first round)
3. (Czechoslovakia) Stanislav Birner / (Czechoslovakia) Jaroslav Navrátil (quarterfinals)
4. (Spain) Emilio Sánchez / (Spain) Javier Sánchez (final)

== Main draw ==
Key

- Q = Qualifier
- WC = Wild card
- LL = Lucky loser
- Alt = Alternate
- ITF = ITF entry
- PR = Protected ranking
- SR = Special ranking
- SE = Special exempt
- JE = Junior exempt
- JR = Junior Accelerator Programme entrant
- CO = College Accelerator Programme entrant
- NG = Next Gen Accelerator Program entrant
- w/o = Walkover
- r = Retired
- d = Defaulted

=== Draw ===
First Round
1	(Sweden) **J Gunnarsson** (Sweden) **A Järryd**	6	**6**	**6**
(Czechoslovakia) M Šrejber (Czechoslovakia) C Suk	**7**	4	4
(Czechoslovakia) **P Korda** (Italy) **D Nargiso**	**6**	**6**
(Poland) W Fibak (France) H Leconte	4	3
4	(Spain) **E Sánchez** (Spain) **J Sánchez**	**6**	**6**
(Brazil) D Campos (Uruguay) D Pérez	3	3
(United States) **M Dickson** (Mexico) **J Lozano**	3	**7**	**7**
(Brazil) R Acioly (Brazil) L Mattar	**6**	5	5
(United States) **M Purcell** (United States) **T Wilkison**	**6**	**7**
(Austria) A Antonitsch (Austria) T Muster	2	6
(West Germany) R Osterthun (Netherlands) M Schapers	2	3
3	(Czechoslovakia) **S Birner** (Czechoslovakia) **J Navrátil**	**6**	**6**
(Australia) **C Limberger** (Israel) **A Mansdorf**	**6**	**6**
(West Germany) A Hornung (West Germany) H Rittersbacher	0	3
(Nigeria) **N Odizor** (United States) **B Testerman**	**7**	**7**
2	(Czechoslovakia) T Šmíd (Sweden) J Svensson	6	6

Quarterfinals
1	(Sweden) J Gunnarsson (Sweden) A Järryd	**7**	6	5
(Czechoslovakia) **P Korda** (Italy) **D Nargiso**	5	**7**	**7**
4	(Spain) **E Sánchez** (Spain) **J Sánchez**	1	**6**	**6**
(United States) M Dickson (Mexico) J Lozano	**6**	4	3
(United States) **M Purcell** (United States) **T Wilkison**	4	**6**	**6**
3	(Czechoslovakia) S Birner (Czechoslovakia) J Navrátil	**6**	1	3
(Australia) **C Limberger** (Israel) **A Mansdorf**	4	**7**	**7**
(Nigeria) N Odizor (United States) B Testerman	**6**	6	6

Semifinals
(Czechoslovakia) P Korda (Italy) D Nargiso	2	1
4	(Spain) **E Sánchez** (Spain) **J Sánchez**	**6**	**6**
(United States) **M Purcell** (United States) **T Wilkison**	4	**6**	**7**
(Australia) C Limberger (Israel) A Mansdorf	**6**	3	5

Final
4	(Spain) Emilio Sánchez (Spain) Javier Sánchez	3	5
(United States) **Mel Purcell** (United States) **Tim Wilkison**	**6**	**7**
