= 1991 Copenhagen Open – Singles =

Singles
- 1991 Copenhagen Open

Final
- Champion: (Sweden) Jonas Svensson
- Runner-up: (Sweden) Anders Järryd
- Score: 6–7^{(5–7)}, 6–2, 6–2

Details
- Draw: 32 (3WC/4Q)
- Seeds: 8

Events
| Singles | Doubles |
| ← 1976 · | Copenhagen Open | · 1992 → |

No defending champions were officially declared as the last edition dates back to 1976, which was won by Lars Elvstrøm.

Jonas Svensson won the title by defeating Anders Järryd 6–7^{(5–7)}, 6–2, 6–2 in the final.

== Seeds ==
1. (Sweden) Jonas Svensson (champion)
2. (Soviet Union) Andrei Chesnokov (second round)
3. (Switzerland) Jakob Hlasek (semifinals)
4. (Czechoslovakia) Karel Nováček (quarterfinals)
5. (Haiti) Ronald Agénor (second round)
6. (Australia) Todd Woodbridge (semifinals)
7. (Sweden) Christian Bergström (quarterfinals)
8. (Sweden) Anders Järryd (final)

== Draw ==
=== Key ===
- Q = Qualifier
- WC = Wild card
- LL = Lucky loser
- Alt = Alternate
- SE = Special exempt
- PR = Protected ranking
- ITF = ITF entry
- JE = Junior exempt
- w/o = Walkover
- r = Retired
- d = Defaulted
- SR = Special ranking

=== Finals ===
Semifinals
1 | (Sweden) Jonas Svensson | 6 | 1 | 6
3 | (Switzerland) Jakob Hlasek | 2 | 6 | 3
6 | (Australia) Todd Woodbridge | 0 | 4
8 | (Sweden) Anders Järryd | 6 | 6

Final
1 | (Sweden) Jonas Svensson | 6^{5} | 6 | 6
8 | (Sweden) Anders Järryd | 7^{7} | 2 | 2

=== Top half ===
First round
1 | (Sweden) J Svensson | 7^{7} | 6
(Czechoslovakia) M Střelba | 6^{3} | 2
(Belgium) E Masso | 6 | 3 | 2
WC | (Denmark) F Fetterlein | 3 | 6 | 6
(Germany) CU Steeb | 3 | 6 | 7
(Sweden) H Holm | 6 | 3 | 5
(Netherlands) J Eltingh | 3 | 5
7 | (Sweden) C Bergström | 6 | 7
3 | (Switzerland) J Hlasek | 2 | 6 | 6
Q | (Germany) M Zoecke | 6 | 4 | 3
(Sweden) L Jönsson | 6 | 6
(Mexico) L Herrera | 1 | 0
Q | (Germany) S Saceanu | 6 | 6
(Denmark) M Tauson | 1 | 2
(Austria) A Antonitsch | 6 | 3 | 4
5/WC | (Haiti) R Agénor | 4 | 6 | 6

Second round
1 | (Sweden) J Svensson | 6 | 2 | 6
WC | (Denmark) F Fetterlein | 3 | 6 | 2
(Germany) CU Steeb | 6 | 3 | 3
7 | (Sweden) C Bergström | 3 | 6 | 6
3 | (Switzerland) J Hlasek | 6 | 6
(Sweden) L Jönsson | 3 | 4
Q | (Germany) S Saceanu | 6 | 7^{8}
5/WC | (Haiti) R Agénor | 3 | 6^{6}

Quarterfinals
1 | (Sweden) J Svensson | 6 | 7
7 | (Sweden) C Bergström | 4 | 5
3 | (Switzerland) J Hlasek | 3 | 6 | 6
Q | (Germany) S Saceanu | 6 | 4 | 4

Semifinals
1 | (Sweden) J Svensson | 6 | 1 | 6
3 | (Switzerland) J Hlasek | 2 | 6 | 3

=== Bottom half ===
First round
6 | (Australia) T Woodbridge | 6 | 7
Q | (Sweden) P Henricsson | 2 | 5
(Italy) S Pescosolido | 4 | 5
(Sweden) T Högstedt | 6 | 7
Q | (Soviet Union) A Olhovskiy | 6^{2} | 6 | 4
(Spain) JF Altur | 7^{7} | 2 | 6
WC | (Sweden) T Enqvist | 2 | 6 | 4
4 | (Czechoslovakia) K Nováček | 6 | 3 | 6
8 | (Sweden) A Järryd | 6 | 6
(Belgium) B Wuyts | 3 | 2
(Sweden) J Gunnarsson | 6 | 6
(Germany) P Kühnen | 3 | 2
(Germany) J Wöhrmann | 6 | 1 | 4
(Australia) M Woodforde | 2 | 6 | 6
(Germany) P Baur | 6 | 2 | 4
2 | (Soviet Union) A Chesnokov | 4 | 6 | 6

Second round
6 | (Australia) T Woodbridge | 6 | 6
(Sweden) T Högstedt | 3 | 0
(Spain) JF Altur | 3 | 2
4 | (Czechoslovakia) K Nováček | 6 | 6
8 | (Sweden) A Järryd | 6 | 6
(Sweden) J Gunnarsson | 3 | 2
(Australia) M Woodforde | 6 | 2 | 7^{7}
2 | (Soviet Union) A Chesnokov | 2 | 6 | 6^{2}

Quarterfinals
6 | (Australia) T Woodbridge | 7^{7} | 4 | 6
4 | (Czechoslovakia) K Nováček | 6^{1} | 6 | 1
8 | (Sweden) A Järryd | 6 | 6
(Australia) M Woodforde | 1 | 3

Semifinals
6 | (Australia) T Woodbridge | 0 | 4
8 | (Sweden) A Järryd | 6 | 6
