= 1986 CA-TennisTrophy =

- Date: 20–27 October
- Edition: 12th
- Category: Grand Prix
- Draw: 32S / 16D
- Prize money: $125,000
- Surface: Hard / indoor
- Location: Vienna, Austria
- Venue: Wiener Stadthalle

Champions

Singles
- (United States) Brad Gilbert

Doubles
- (Brazil) Ricardo Acioly / (Poland) Wojciech Fibak
- Vienna Open

The 1986 CA-TennisTrophy was a men's tennis tournament played on indoor hard courts at the Wiener Stadthalle in Vienna, Austria that was part of the 1986 Nabisco Grand Prix. The tournament ran from 20 October until 27 October 1986. First-seeded Brad Gilbert won the singles title.

== Finals ==
=== Singles ===
(United States) Brad Gilbert defeated (Czechoslovakia) Karel Nováček 3–6, 6–3, 7–5, 6–0

- It was Gilbert's 5th title of the year and the 12th of his career.

=== Doubles ===
(Brazil) Ricardo Acioly' / (Poland) Wojciech Fibak defeated (United States) Brad Gilbert / (Socialist Federal Republic of Yugoslavia) Slobodan Živojinović by walkover

- It was Acioly's only title of the year and the 1st of his career. It was Fibak's 3rd title of the year and the 65th of his career.
