= 1987 CA-TennisTrophy – Singles =

Singles
- 1987 CA-TennisTrophy

Final
- Champion: (Sweden) Jonas Svensson
- Runner-up: (Israel) Amos Mansdorf
- Score: 1–6, 1–6, 6–2, 6–3, 7–5

Details
- Draw: 32
- Seeds: 8

Events
Singles	Doubles
← 1986 ·	Vienna Open	· 1988 →

The 1987 CA-TennisTrophy was a tennis tournament played on indoor hard courts at the Wiener Stadthalle in Vienna, Austria. Brad Gilbert was the defending champion but did not compete that year. Jonas Svensson won in the final 1–6, 1–6, 6–2, 6–3, 7–5 against Amos Mansdorf.

== Seeds ==
1. (United States) Tim Mayotte (quarterfinals)
2. (Spain) Emilio Sánchez (quarterfinals)
3. (Sweden) Anders Järryd (quarterfinals)
4. (France) Henri Leconte (first round)
5. (Sweden) Jonas Svensson (champion)
6. (Israel) Amos Mansdorf (final)
7. (Switzerland) Claudio Mezzadri (semifinals)
8. (Czechoslovakia) Tomáš Šmíd (first round)

== Draw ==
=== Key ===
- Q = Qualifier
- WC = Wild card
- LL = Lucky loser
- Alt = Alternate
- SE = Special exempt
- PR = Protected ranking
- ITF = ITF entry
- JE = Junior exempt
- w/o = Walkover
- r = Retired
- d = Defaulted
- SR = Special ranking

=== Final ===
Semifinals
7	(Switzerland) Claudio Mezzadri	2	3
5	(Sweden) Jonas Svensson	6	6
6	(Israel) Amos Mansdorf	2	6	6
(Austria) Thomas Muster	6	4	2

Final
5	(Sweden) Jonas Svensson	1	1	6	6	7
6	(Israel) Amos Mansdorf	6	6	2	3	5

=== Section 1 ===
First round
1	(United States) T Mayotte	6	6
(Spain) J Sánchez	4	4
(United States) T Wilkison	6	7
(United States) B Testerman	3	5
(United States) K Jones	2	2
(Sweden) C Bergström	6	6
(West Germany) R Osterthun	1	5
7	(Switzerland) C Mezzadri	6	7
WC/4	(France) H Leconte	4	2
Q	(Sweden) M Gustafsson	6	6
(Czechoslovakia) M Šrejber	2	6	7
(Nigeria) N Odizor	6	4	5
(Sweden) J Gunnarsson	6	7
(Uruguay) D Pérez	3	5
Q	(Czechoslovakia) S Birner	3	0
5	(Sweden) J Svensson	6	6

Second round
1	(United States) T Mayotte	6	6
(United States) T Wilkison	4	3
(Sweden) C Bergström	2	4
7	(Switzerland) C Mezzadri	6	6
Q	(Sweden) M Gustafsson	6	3	4
(Czechoslovakia) M Šrejber	4	6	6
(Sweden) J Gunnarsson	5	2
5	(Sweden) J Svensson	7	6

Quarterfinals
1	(United States) T Mayotte	6	7	6
7	(Switzerland) C Mezzadri	7	6	7
(Czechoslovakia) M Šrejber	1	7	2
5	(Sweden) J Svensson	6	5	6

Semifinals
7	(Switzerland) C Mezzadri	2	3
5	(Sweden) J Svensson	6	6

=== Section 2 ===
First round
6	(Israel) A Mansdorf	6	6
(Czechoslovakia) K Nováček	1	4
Q	(United States) M Dickson	6	6	6
(Brazil) L Mattar	3	7	1
Q	(United States) R Matuszewski	3	6	6
WC	(Austria) A Antonitsch	6	1	2
(Argentina) H de la Peña	2	0
3	(Sweden) A Järryd	6	6
8	(Czechoslovakia) T Šmíd	6	3
(Austria) T Muster	7	6
(Czechoslovakia) J Navrátil	6	5
(Austria) H Skoff	7	7
(United States) M Purcell	6	4
(Netherlands) M Schapers	7	6
WC	(Poland) W Fibak	6	3	5
2	(Spain) E Sánchez	2	6	7

Second round
6	(Israel) A Mansdorf	4	6	6
Q	(United States) M Dickson	6	0	2
Q	(United States) R Matuszewski	3	1
3	(Sweden) A Järryd	6	6
(Austria) T Muster	6	6
(Austria) H Skoff	4	4
(Netherlands) M Schapers	6	7	4
2	(Spain) E Sánchez	7	6	6

Quarterfinals
6	(Israel) A Mansdorf	4	7	6
3	(Sweden) A Järryd	6	5	2
(Austria) T Muster	6	6
2	(Spain) E Sánchez	4	4

Semifinals
6	(Israel) A Mansdorf	2	6	6
(Austria) T Muster	6	4	2
