= Colin Dowdeswell =

British tennis player

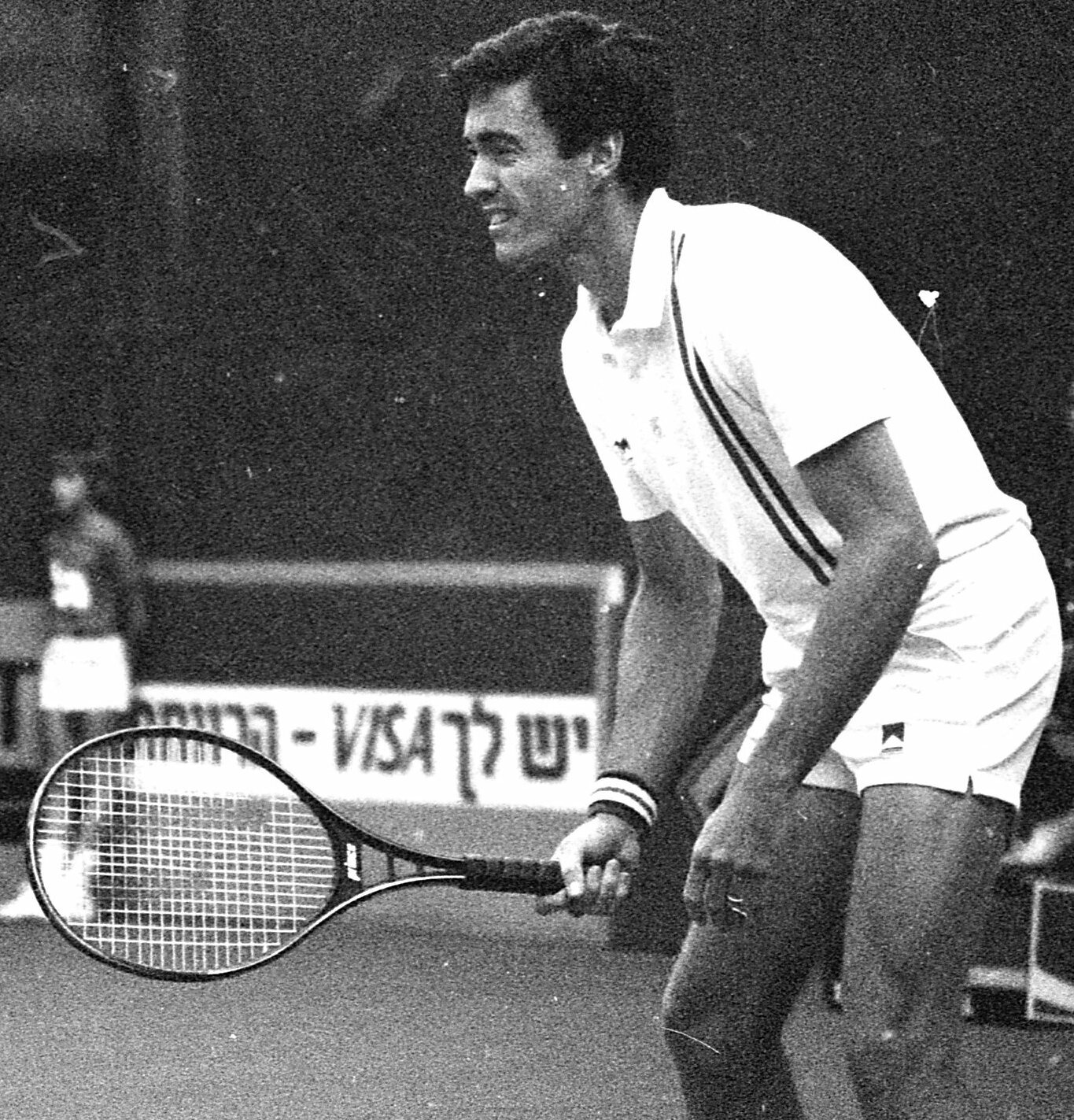
- Colin Dowdeswell (1983)
- Country (sports): Rhodesia (1972–1976); Switzerland (1977–1981); United Kingdom (1982–1986)
- Born: 12 May 1955 (age 71) London, England
- Height: 6 ft 1 in (1.85 m)
- Plays: Right-handed
- Prize money: $327,277

Singles
- Career record: 113–171
- Career titles: 1
- Highest ranking: No. 31 (12 December 1983)

Grand Slam singles results
- Australian Open: 2R (1984)
- French Open: 2R (1977, 1978, 1979)
- Wimbledon: 2R (1977, 1978, 1979, 1982, 1986)
- US Open: 4R (1976, 1978)

Doubles
- Career record: 216–162
- Career titles: 11
- Highest ranking: No. 24 (24 March 1980)

Grand Slam doubles results
- Australian Open: 3R (1984, 1985)
- French Open: QF (1977)
- Wimbledon: F (1975)
- US Open: SF (1976)

Grand Slam mixed doubles results
- French Open: F (1976)
- Wimbledon: QF (1976, 1980)
- US Open: SF (1984)

Colin Dowdeswell (born 12 May 1955) is a former professional tennis player who represented, at different times, Rhodesia, Switzerland and the United Kingdom, and who achieved rank as UK No. 1. During his time on the world tour, he won one singles title and eleven doubles titles. The highlight of his career was reaching the doubles final of Wimbledon.

== Early life ==
Dowdeswell was born in London but grew up in Rhodesia. He was educated at Prince Edward School and The University of the Witswatersrand. He also received an MBA at Insead business school in 1987.

== Tennis career highlights ==
Partnering Australian Allan Stone, Dowdeswell finished runner-up in doubles at Wimbledon in 1975. Unseeded, after two straight sets wins, they defeated the No. 7 seeds Tom Okker and Marty Riessen in the round of 16 in four sets. They did likewise in eliminating the No. 3 seeds, Bob Hewitt and Frew McMillan, in the quarterfinals. It took Dowdeswell and Stone then five sets to overcome the unseeded team of Dick Crealy and Niki Pilic in the semifinals. They lost the final to another unseeded tandem, Vitas Gerulaitis and Sandy Mayer, 5–7, 6–8, 4–6.

Dowdeswell achieved a career-high singles ranking of world No. 31 in 1983 and a career-high doubles ranking of world No. 24 in 1980.

== Career finals ==
=== Singles: 4 (1 title / 3 runner-ups) ===
Result	W–L	Date	Tournament	Surface	Opponent	Score
Loss	0–1	Jul 1974	Dublin, Ireland	Hard	(United States) Sherwood Stewart	3–6, 8–9
Win	1–1	Jul 1975	Istanbul, Turkey	Clay	(United States) Ferdi Taygan	6–1, 6–4, 6–2
Loss	1–2	Apr 1978	Johannesburg, South Africa	Hard	(United States) Cliff Richey	2–6, 4–6
Loss	1–3	Nov 1983	Johannesburg, South Africa	Hard	(United States) Johan Kriek	4–6, 6–4, 6–1, 5–7, 3–6

=== Doubles: 28 (11 titles / 17 runner-ups) ===
Result	W–L	Date	Tournament	Surface	Partner	Opponents	Score
Win	1–0	Jul 1974	Dublin, Ireland	Hard	(South Africa) John Yuill	(Argentina) Lito Álvarez (Venezuela) Jorge Andrew	6–3, 6–2
Loss	1–1	Jan 1975	Birmingham, U.S.	Carpet (i)	(South Africa) John Yuill	(West Germany) Jürgen Fassbender (West Germany) Karl Meiler	1–6, 6–3, 6–7
Loss	1–2	Jul 1975	Wimbledon, London	Grass	(Australia) Allan Stone	(United States) Vitas Gerulaitis (United States) Sandy Mayer	5–7, 6–8, 4–6
Loss	1–3	Jul 1975	Gstaad, Switzerland	Clay	(Australia) Ken Rosewall	(West Germany) Jürgen Fassbender (West Germany) Hans-Jürgen Pohmann	4–6, 7–9, 1–6
Loss	1–4	Jul 1975	Istanbul, Turkey	Clay	(United Kingdom) John Feaver	(Australia) Colin Dibley (Brazil) Thomaz Koch	2–6, 2–6, 2–6
Loss	1–5	Mar 1976	Nuremberg, Germany	Carpet (i)	(Australia) Paul Kronk	(South Africa) Frew McMillan (West Germany) Karl Meiler	6–7, 4–6
Loss	1–6	Apr 1976	Barcelona, Spain	Clay	(Australia) Paul Kronk	(Poland) Wojciech Fibak (Poland) Jacek Niedźwiedzki	2–6, 3–6
Loss	1–7	Nov 1976	Cologne, Germany	Carpet (i)	(United States) Mike Estep	(South Africa) Bob Hewitt (South Africa) Frew McMillan	1–6, 6–3, 6–7
Loss	1–8	Jul 1977	Gstaad, Switzerland	Clay	(South Africa) Bob Hewitt	(West Germany) Jürgen Fassbender (West Germany) Karl Meiler	4–6, 6–7
Loss	1–9	Jul 1977	Kitzbühel, Austria	Clay	(Australia) Chris Kachel	(United Kingdom) Buster Mottram (United Kingdom) Roger Taylor	6–7, 4–6
Win	2–9	Jan 1978	Sarasota, U.S.	Carpet	(Australia) Geoff Masters	(South Africa) Byron Bertram (South Africa) Bernard Mitton	2–6, 6–3, 6–2
Loss	2–10	Mar 1978	Lagos, Nigeria	Clay	(West Germany) Jürgen Fassbender	(United States) George Hardie (India) Sashi Menon	3–6, 6–3, 5–7
Win	3–10	Jun 1978	Berlin, Germany	Clay	(West Germany) Jürgen Fassbender	(Socialist Federal Republic of Yugoslavia) Željko Franulović (Chile) Hans Gildemeister	6–3, 6–4
Loss	3–11	Aug 1978	Toronto, Canada	Clay	(Switzerland) Heinz Günthardt	(Poland) Wojciech Fibak (Netherlands) Tom Okker	3–6, 6–7
Win	4–11	Apr 1979	Johannesburg, South Africa	Hard	(Switzerland) Heinz Günthardt	(South Africa) Raymond Moore (Romania) Ilie Năstase	6–3, 7–6
Win	5–11	Jul 1979	Stuttgart Outdoor, Germany	Clay	(South Africa) Frew McMillan	(Poland) Wojciech Fibak (Czechoslovakia) Pavel Složil	6–4, 6–2, 2–6, 6–4
Loss	5–12	Apr 1980	Johannesburg, South Africa	Hard	(Switzerland) Heinz Günthardt	(South Africa) Bob Hewitt (South Africa) Frew McMillan	4–6, 3–6
Win	6–12	Jul 1980	Gstaad, Switzerland	Clay	(Egypt) Ismail El Shafei	(Australia) Mark Edmondson (Australia) Kim Warwick	6–4, 6–4
Win	7–12	Jul 1980	Stuttgart Outdoor, Germany	Clay	(South Africa) Frew McMillan	(New Zealand) Chris Lewis (South Africa) John Yuill	6–3, 6–4
Loss	7–13	Jul 1983	Gstaad, Switzerland	Clay	(Poland) Wojciech Fibak	(Czechoslovakia) Pavel Složil (Czechoslovakia) Tomáš Šmíd	7–6, 4–6, 2–6
Loss	7–14	Jul 1983	Kitzbühel, Austria	Clay	(Hungary) Zoltán Kuhárszky	(Poland) Wojciech Fibak (Czechoslovakia) Pavel Složil	5–7, 2–6
Win	8–14	Oct 1983	Tel Aviv, Israel	Hard	(Hungary) Zoltán Kuhárszky	(West Germany) Peter Elter (Austria) Peter Feigl	6–4, 7–5
Loss	8–15	Jul 1984	Kitzbühel, Austria	Clay	(Poland) Wojciech Fibak	(France) Henri Leconte (France) Pascal Portes	6–2, 6–7, 6–7
Loss	8–16	Sep 1984	Tel Aviv, Israel	Hard	(Switzerland) Jakob Hlasek	(Australia) Peter Doohan (South Africa) Brian Levine	3–6, 4–6
Win	9–16	Sep 1985	Palermo, Italy	Clay	(Sweden) Joakim Nyström	(Spain) Sergio Casal (Spain) Emilio Sánchez	6–4, 6–7, 7–6
Win	10–16	Oct 1985	Johannesburg, South Africa	Hard	(South Africa) Christo van Rensburg	(Israel) Amos Mansdorf (Israel) Shahar Perkiss	3–6, 7–6, 6–4
Win	11–16	Mar 1986	Milan, Italy	Carpet (i)	(South Africa) Christo Steyn	(South Africa) Brian Levine (Australia) Laurie Warder	6–3, 4–6, 6–1
Loss	11–17	Apr 1986	Nice, France	Clay	(United States) Gary Donnelly	(Switzerland) Jakob Hlasek (Czechoslovakia) Pavel Složil	3–6, 6–4, 9–11

== Davis Cup ==
Dowdeswell participated in one Davis Cup tie for Rhodesia in 1976, posting a 2–0 record in singles and an 0–1 record in doubles. He participated in six Davis Cup ties for Great Britain from 1984 to 1986, posting an 0–2 record in singles and a 5–1 record in doubles.

== Life outside tennis ==
Dowdeswell completed his tennis career in 1986 and began a career in financial services and private banking with Merrill Lynch. Married with three children, he resides in Monaco.
