= Zoltán Kuhárszky =

Hungarian-Swiss tennis player

Zoltán Kuharszky
- Native name: Kuharszky Zoltán
- Country (sports): Hungary1982– Switzerland1995–
- Born: 8 July 1959 (age 67) Budapest, Hungary
- Turned pro: 1980
- Retired: 1985 (as a player)

Singles
- Career record: 43–71
- Career titles: 0

Doubles
- Career record: 53–65
- Career titles: 2

Coaching career (1995–)
- Hungary Davis Cup team (1999–2000) and (2014–2016); Switzerland Fed Cup team (2003–2004); Petra Martić(2009–2013); Polona Hercog (2007–2011); Anke Huber (1996–1998); Jennifer Capriati (short); Ana Ivanovic (2004–2006); Myriam Casanova; Ágnes Szávay (2007–2009); Magdalena Maleeva (2005)

Coaching achievements
- Coachee singles titles total: 1(I)-2(Sz)-3(Hu)
- Coachee doubles titles total: 2(Sz)-2(He)-1(Hu)

Coaching awards and records
- Awards Hungarian Coach of the year 2007 Records Sony Ericsson WTA Tour most Improved player (2005) (Ivanovic); WTA Newcomer of the Year (2007) (Szávay)

Zoltán Kuhárszky (born 8 July 1959) is a former tennis player from Hungary who became a Swiss citizen in 1995. Kuharszky won two doubles titles during his professional career. He reached his highest singles ATP ranking on July 30, 1984, when he became the number 53 in the world, though he never won a singles title in his career.

Zoltan Kuharszky was the captain of the Hungary Davis Cup team from December 2014 to December 2016. He stepped down due to conflict of interest because he became the coach of Máté Valkusz who is a member of the Hungarian Davis Cup team. In the past, he coached Anke Huber, Jennifer Capriati, Ana Ivanovic, Myriam Casanova, Ágnes Szávay, Polona Hercog, and Petra Martić.

== Career finals ==
=== Doubles (2 won, 3 lost) ===
Result	W/L	Date	Tournament	Surface	Partner	Opponent	Score
Win	1–0	Feb 1982	Buenos Aires, Argentina	Clay	(Austria) Hans Kary	(Spain) Ángel Giménez (Spain) Manuel Orantes	7–5, 6–2
Loss	1–1	May 1983	Madrid, Spain	Clay	(Switzerland) Markus Günthardt	(Switzerland) Heinz Günthardt (Czechoslovakia) Pavel Složil	3–6, 3–6
Loss	1–2	Jun 1983	Venice, Italy	Clay	(Israel) Steve Krulevitz	(Paraguay) Francisco González (Paraguay) Víctor Pecci	1–6, 2–6
Loss	1–3	Jul 1983	Kitzbühel, Austria	Clay	(Zimbabwe) Colin Dowdeswell	(Poland) Wojtek Fibak (Czechoslovakia) Pavel Složil	5–7, 2–6
Win	2–3	Oct 1983	Tel Aviv, Israel	Hard	(Zimbabwe) Colin Dowdeswell	(West Germany) Peter Elter (Austria) Peter Feigl	6–4, 7–5
