= Nick Saviano =

American tennis player & coach (born 1956)

- Country (sports): United States
- Residence: Sunrise, Florida
- Born: June 5, 1956 (age 70) Teaneck, New Jersey, US
- Height: 5 ft 11 in (1.80 m)
- Turned pro: 1973
- Retired: 1984
- Plays: Left-handed (one-handed backhand)

Singles
- Career record: 157–198
- Career titles: 1
- Highest ranking: No. 48 (12 July 1978)

Grand Slam singles results
- Australian Open: 2R (1977^{Jan}, 1982)
- French Open: 1R (1977, 1978, 1979, 1982)
- Wimbledon: 4R (1980, 1982)
- US Open: 3R (1979)

Doubles
- Career record: 84–136
- Career titles: 3
- Highest ranking: No. 94 (2 January 1984)

Nick Saviano (born June 5, 1956) is an American former tennis player and subsequent tennis coach.

== Career ==
Saviano won one singles title during his career as a pro (1983 Lorraine Open). The left-hander reached his highest individual ranking on the professional ATP Tour on July 12, 1978, when he became the number 48 ranked player in the world. On October 7, 1979, he won a doubles title with John Lloyd in Hawaii. He was an All-American playing tennis for the Stanford Cardinal and has resided in Sunrise, FL.

Saviano was the coach of Canadian tennis pro Eugenie Bouchard during her greatest successes on the WTA Tour. He also has been the coach of former world No. 3, Sloane Stephens.

== Career finals ==
=== Singles (1 title, 2 runner-ups) ===
Result	W/L	Date	Tournament	Surface	Opponent	Score
Loss	0–1	Jan 1978	Sarasota, U.S.	Carpet (i)	(Czechoslovakia) Tomáš Šmíd	6–7, 6–0, 5–7
Loss	0–2	Nov 1980	Cologne, West Germany	Carpet (i)	(United States) Bob Lutz	4–6, 0–6
Win	1–2	Mar 1983	Lorraine, France	Hard	(United States) Chip Hooper	6–4, 4–6, 6–3

=== Doubles (3 titles, 2 runner-ups) ===
Result	W-L	Date	Tournament	Surface	Partner	Opponents	Score
Loss	0–1	Oct 1977	Perth, Australia	Hard	(United States) John Whitlinger	(Australia) Ray Ruffels (Australia) Allan Stone	2–6, 1–6
Win	1–1	Oct 1979	Maui, U.S.	Hard	(United Kingdom) John Lloyd	(Australia) Rod Frawley (Paraguay) Francisco González	7–5, 6–4
Loss	1–2	Mar 1980	San Jose, Costa Rica	Hard	(India) Anand Amritraj	(Chile) Jaime Fillol (Chile) Álvaro Fillol	2–6, 6–7
Win	2–2	Mar 1981	Stuttgart, West Germany	Carpet (i)	(United Kingdom) Buster Mottram	(United States) Craig Edwards (United States) Eddie Edwards	3–6, 6–1, 6–2
Win	3–2	Oct 1983	Cologne, West Germany	Hard	(Romania) Florin Segărceanu	(United States) Paul Annacone (United States) Eric Korita	6–3, 6–4
