= Hans-Dieter Beutel =

German tennis player (born 1962)

- Country (sports): West Germany
- Residence: Hannover/Stuttgart
- Born: 12 June 1962 (age 63) Esslingen, West Germany
- Height: 1.85 m (6 ft 1 in)
- Plays: Right-handed
- Prize money: $113,016

Singles
- Career record: 18–44
- Career titles: 0
- Highest ranking: No. 101 (21 November 1983)

Grand Slam singles results
- Australian Open: 2R (1984, 1989)
- French Open: 1R (1984, 1985)
- Wimbledon: 1R (1984)

Doubles
- Career record: 17–25
- Career titles: 0
- Highest ranking: No. 110 (3 January 1983)

Hans-Dieter Beutel (born 12 June 1962) is a former professional tennis player from West Germany.

== Career ==
Beutel was a losing finalist in the 1980 Wimbledon boys' singles event, to Frenchman Thierry Tulasne.

In 1981, Beutel made the semi-finals of the Sofia Open.

He was the German National Champion in 1982, for both indoor and outdoor singles and in the outdoor doubles. Also that year he reached the quarter-finals in Linz and was a doubles runner-up in Cologne.

Beutel was a singles finalist at Cologne in 1983, beating Carlos Kirmayr, Shlomo Glickstein, Eric Jelen and Pavel Složil en route. He made the quarter-finals at Båstad the following year.

He won two Grand Slam matches during his career, both at the Australian Open. In the 1984 tournament, he defeated countryman Jelen in the opening round, before going down to Tarik Benhabiles in five sets. At the 1989 Australian Open he came from two sets down to overcome Laurent Prades in the first round. He was eliminated in the second round by 14th seed Jonas Svensson.

The West German appeared in five Davis Cup ties for his national team in the early 1980s, winning three of his eight rubbers, one in singles and two in doubles.

== Grand Prix career finals ==
=== Singles: 1 (0–1) ===
Result	W-L	Date	Tournament	Surface	Opponent	Score
Loss	0–1	Oct 1983	Cologne, West Germany	Carpet	(Republic of Ireland) Matt Doyle	6–1, 1–6, 2–6

=== Doubles: 1 (0–1) ===
Result	W-L	Date	Tournament	Surface	Partner	Opponents	Score
Loss	0–1	Oct 1982	Cologne, West Germany	Hard	(West Germany) Christoph Zipf	(Uruguay) José Luis Damiani (Brazil) Carlos Kirmayr	2–6, 6–3, 5–7

== Challenger titles ==
=== Singles: (2) ===
No.	Year	Tournament	Surface	Opponent	Score
1.	1983	Dortmund, West Germany	Clay	(France) Jérôme Vanier	6–7, 6–3, 6–4
2.	1988	Fürth, West Germany	Clay	(Czechoslovakia) Richard Vogel	1–6, 6–3, 6–4

=== Doubles: (1) ===
No.	Year	Tournament	Surface	Partner	Opponents	Score
1.	1984	Neunkirchen, West Germany	Clay	(West Germany) Christoph Zipf	(West Germany) Ulf Fischer (West Germany) Eric Jelen	7–6, 7–5
