= 1984 Cologne Cup =

German tennis tournament

- Date: 15–21 October
- Edition: 9th
- Category: Grand Prix
- Draw: 32S / 16D
- Prize money: $75,000
- Surface: Carpet / indoor
- Location: Cologne, West Germany

Champions

Singles
- (Sweden) Joakim Nyström

Doubles
- (Poland) Wojciech Fibak / (United States) Sandy Mayer
- Cologne Grand Prix

The 1984 Cologne Cup, also known as the Cologne Grand Prix, was a men's tennis tournament played on indoor carpet courts in Cologne, West Germany that was part of the 1984 Volvo Grand Prix circuit. It was the ninth edition of the tournament and was held from 15 October through 21 October 1984. First-seeded Joakim Nyström won the singles title.

== Finals ==
=== Singles ===
(Sweden) Joakim Nyström defeated (Czechoslovakia) Miloslav Mečíř 7–6, 6–2

- It was Nyström's 1st singles title of the year and the 5th of his career.

=== Doubles ===
(Poland) Wojciech Fibak / (United States) Sandy Mayer defeated (Sweden) Jan Gunnarsson / (Sweden) Joakim Nyström 6–3, 6–4
