= Matt Doyle (tennis) =

American-born Irish tennis player (1954 or 1955 – 2025)

- Country (sports): United States; Ireland
- Residence: Ireland
- Born: 1954 or 1955 California, U.S.
- Died: 8 February 2025 (aged 70) Straffan, Ireland
- Height: 6 ft 4 in (193 cm)
- Plays: Right-handed
- College: Yale University
- Prize money: US$155,442

Singles
- Career record: 47–69
- Career titles: 1
- Highest ranking: No. 65 (15 March 1982)

Grand Slam singles results
- Australian Open: 3R (1984)
- French Open: 1R (1982, 1983, 1984)
- Wimbledon: 2R (1983, 1984)
- US Open: 4R (1982)

Doubles
- Career record: 23–49
- Career titles: 0
- Highest ranking: No. 117 (3 January 1983)

Grand Slam doubles results
- Australian Open: 1R (1985)
- French Open: 1R (1980, 1982, 1986)
- Wimbledon: 1R (1980, 1982, 1984)
- US Open: 2R (1982)

Mixed doubles
- Career record: 1–4
- Career titles: 0

Grand Slam mixed doubles results
- French Open: 1R (1984)
- Wimbledon: 2R (1982)
- US Open: 1R (1981)

Team competitions
- Davis Cup: World Group 1R (1983)

Matthew Doyle (1954 or 1955 – 8 February 2025) was an American-Irish professional tour tennis player. His best result was reaching the fourth round of the US Open in 1982. He was also a long-time Irish Davis Cup player. After retiring from playing, he was Ireland's coach for several years.

== Early life and education ==
Matthew Doyle was born in California in 1954 or 1955. He was of Irish descent.

He studied economics at Yale University, graduating in 1978. Doyle played at different times basketball, golf and tennis while at university.

== Tour overview ==
Doyle defeated Ricardo Acuña, Mark Edmondson and Hans Simonsson, all in four sets, to reach the Round of 16 at the 1982 US Open, where he went down to another American of Irish descent, John McEnroe, in straight sets. He won one singles tour title, the 1983 Cologne Grand Prix, and reached a career high singles ranking of world No. 65, in March, 1982. Doyle also reached the 3rd round of the 1984 Australian Open, and the second round of Wimbledon in both 1983 and 1984. In addition to reaching the Round of 16 in 1982, Doyle also reached the second round of the US Open in 1981 and 1984.

In doubles, he only got past the opening round in a Grand Slam main draw once, also at the 1982 US Open, partnering with his fellow Yale alumnus, (the late) Cary Leeds. His career doubles win–loss record for (top-tier) tour events was just 23 and 48, and his career high ranking was World No. 117. Despite this, he did manage a semi-finals showing at the 1982 Italian Open, where he partnered with Leo Palin, and one finals appearance in a tour event — a runner's-up showing in the 1982 Metz Grand Prix, partnering with David Siegler.

== Davis Cup ==
Of Irish ancestry, Doyle played in 17 Davis Cup ties for the Ireland Davis Cup team over 8 years. In the Irish's sole appearance in the World Group, in 1983, Doyle kept Irish hopes alive versus Italy in the first round by winning the fourth rubber over Claudio Panatta, in an away tie (played on clay). Unfortunately, however, Corrado Barazzutti was in top form and easily dispatched Sean Sorensen in the deciding fifth match, 6–0, 6–3, 6–3. (Doyle had also lost to Barazzutti in straight sets in the opening rubber.) This loss, however, set up a memorable tie versus the United States, with the winner to remain in the World Group for the following year. Played at RDS Arena to accommodate the 6000 spectators who attended, the match-up featured World No. 1 John McEnroe playing competitively for his only time in Ireland. As expected, McEnroe dominated, winning his two singles matches — as well as the doubles rubber with his partner Peter Fleming — in straight sets. Doyle stayed close in the first set versus McEnroe, succumbing in the end 7–9, before going down in the second and third sets 3–6, 3–6. Doyle did get the only consolation win, leveling the tie at one apiece by defeating Eliot Teltscher in the second rubber, 6–3, 6–4, 6–4. Doyle had a career singles Davis Cup match win–loss record of 19 and 10, and a doubles record of 8 and 7.

== Grand Prix career finals ==
=== Singles: 1 (1–0) ===
Result	W-L	Date	Tournament	Surface	Opponent	Score
Win	1–0	Oct 1983	Cologne, West Germany	Carpet	(West Germany) Hans-Dieter Beutel	1–6, 6–1, 6–2

== Post-playing career ==
Doyle was work-out partner of Mats Wilander when the Swede reached his peak in 1988.

Doyle was Ireland's national coach for several years, and was ATP president from 1985 to 1987.

== Personal life and death ==
Despite playing for the Irish Davis Cup team as early as 1981, Doyle did not become a naturalized Irish citizen until 1985. He is judged officially to have represented the U.S. on the tour, aside from Davis Cup, until 1985.

Doyle died on 8 February 2025, at the age of 70.
