= Christoph Zipf =

German tennis player (born 1962)

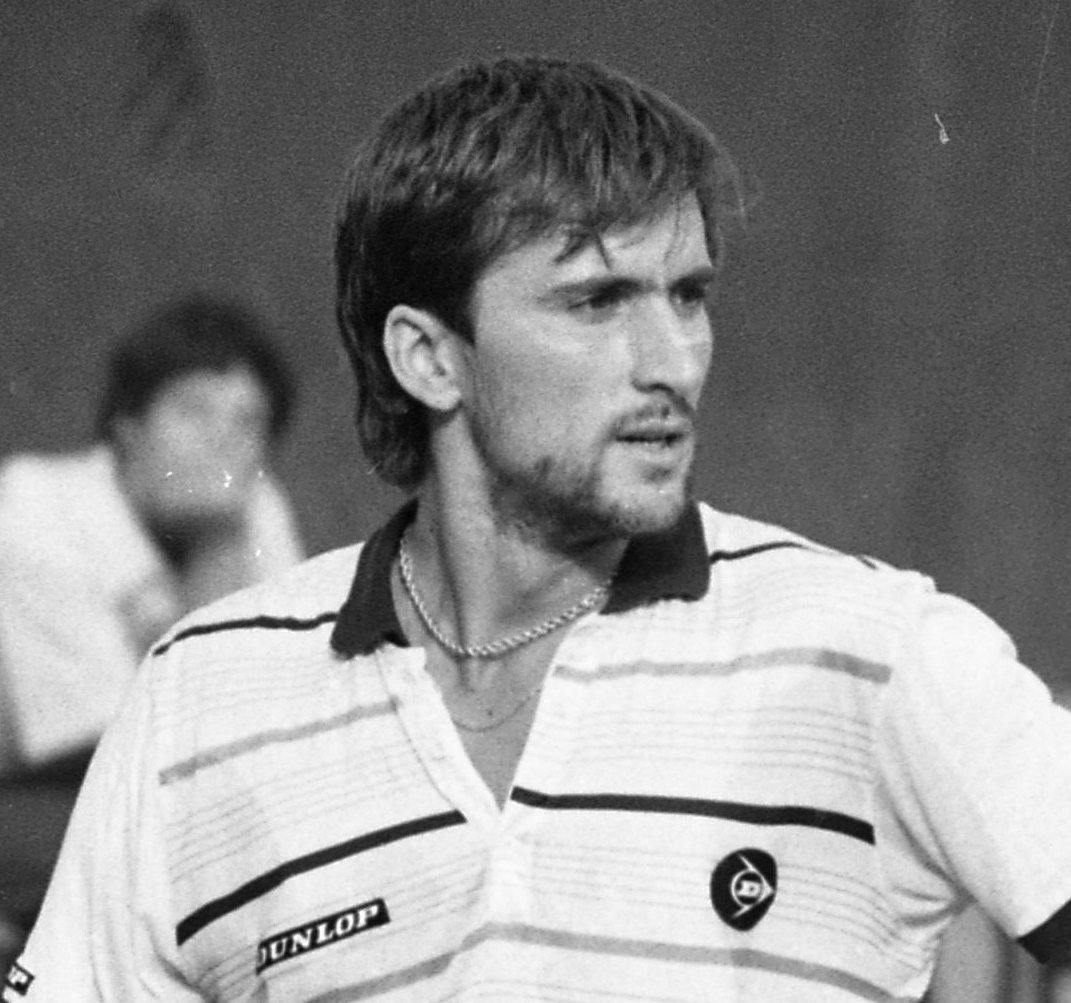
- Full name: Christoph Zipf
- Country (sports): West Germany
- Born: 5 December 1962 (age 62); Frankfurt, West Germany
- Plays: Right-handed

Singles
- Career record: 15–28
- Career titles: 0
- Highest ranking: No. 138 (16 July 1984)

Doubles
- Career record: 17–27
- Career titles: 0
- Highest ranking: No. 95 (3 January 1983)

Christoph Zipf (born 5 December 1962) is a former professional tennis player from Germany.

== Biography ==
A Munich-based right-hander, Zipf was the European Under 18s singles and doubles champion in 1979. He was also a member of the West German team which won the 1981 Galea Cup.

During his professional career he was unable to qualify for the main draw at a Grand Slam tournament, but made two finals on the Grand Prix circuit. He partnered with countryman Hans-Dieter Beutel to finish runner-up at Cologne in 1982. The following year, Zipf reached the singles finals of the 1983 Tel Aviv Open, as an unseeded player. He lost in the final to American Aaron Krickstein.

Zipf represented the West Germany Davis Cup team in three ties, all doubles matches. He helped the West Germans win a World Group Relegation Play-off in the 1981 Davis Cup tournament, over Brazil in São Paulo. He teamed up with Beutel to win the doubles rubber over Marcos Hocevar and Carlos Kirmayr, in a tie which was ultimately won 3–2 in the last reverse singles.

He later worked as a chiropractor and in 1998 treated a back injury for Pete Sampras.

== Grand Prix career finals ==
=== Singles: 1 (0–1) ===
Result	W–L	Date	Tournament	Surface	Opponent	Score
Loss	0–1	Oct 1983	Tel Aviv, Israel	Hard	(United States) Aaron Krickstein	6–7, 3–6

=== Doubles: 1 (0–1) ===
Result	W–L	Date	Tournament	Surface	Partner	Opponents	Score
Loss	0–1	Oct 1982	Cologne, West Germany	Hard	(West Germany) Hans-Dieter Beutel	(Uruguay) José Luis Damiani (Brazil) Carlos Kirmayr	2–6, 6–3, 5–7

== Challenger titles ==
=== Doubles: (2) ===
No.	Year	Tournament	Surface	Partner	Opponents	Score
1.	1982	Barcelona, Spain	Clay	(Spain) Sergio Casal	(Australia) Broderick Dyke (Austria) Hans-Peter Kandler	5–7, 6–1, 6–2
2.	1984	Neunkirchen, West Germany	Clay	(West Germany) Hans-Dieter Beutel	(West Germany) Ulf Fischer (West Germany) Eric Jelen	7–6, 7–5

== See also ==
- List of Germany Davis Cup team representatives
