= Peter Elter =

West German tennis player (born 1958)

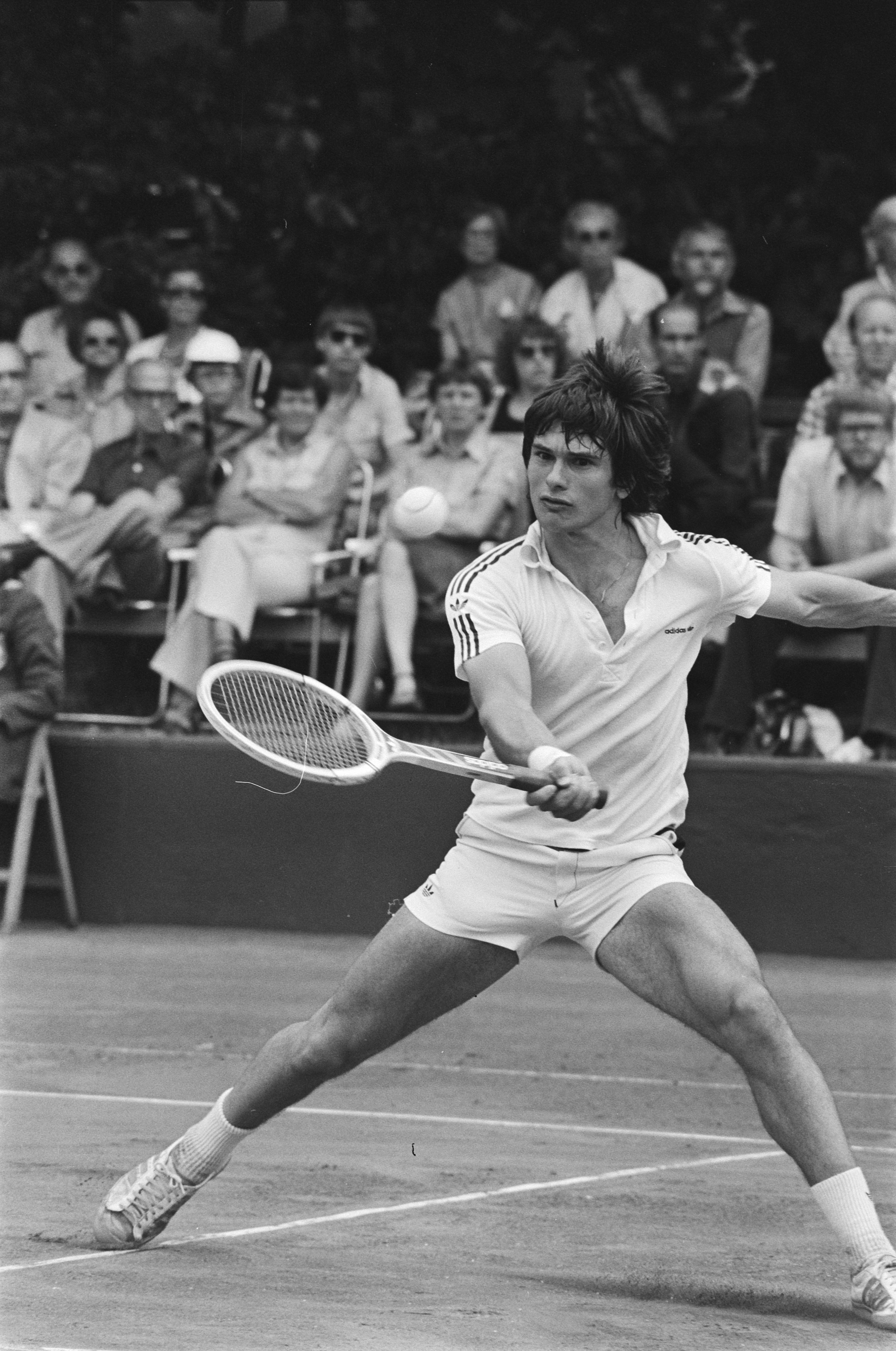
- Elter at the 1978 Dutch Open
- Country (sports): West Germany
- Born: 10 June 1958 (age 66); Frankfurt, West Germany
- Height: 1.78 m (5 ft 10 in)
- Plays: Right-handed
- Prize money: $242,362

Singles
- Career record: 87–120
- Career titles: 0
- Highest ranking: No. 51 (18 October 1982)

Grand Slam singles results
- French Open: 3R (1977, 1982)
- Wimbledon: 2R (1982, 1983)

Doubles
- Career record: 26–66
- Career titles: 0
- Highest ranking: No. 100 (25 June 1984)

Peter Elter (born 10 June 1958) is a former professional tennis player from West Germany.

During his career, Elter did not win any singles titles but finished runner-up on three occasions. He achieved a career-high singles ranking of world No. 51 in October 1982.

Elter played in four ties for the West German Davis Cup team between 1978 and 1981.

== ATP career finals ==
=== Singles: 3 (3 runner-ups) ===
Result	W/L	Date	Tournament	Surface	Opponent	Score
Loss	0–1	Nov 1979	Bombay, India	Clay	(India) Vijay Amritraj	1–6, 5–7
Loss	0–2	Mar 1981	Cairo, Egypt	Clay	(Argentina) Guillermo Vilas	2–6, 3–6
Loss	0–3	May 1982	Munich, Germany	Clay	(United States) Gene Mayer	6–3, 3–6, 2–6, 1–6

=== Doubles: 1 (1 runner-up) ===
Result	W/L	Date	Tournament	Surface	Partner	Opponents	Score
Loss	0–1	Oct 1983	Tel Aviv, Israel	Clay	(Austria) Peter Feigl	(United Kingdom) Colin Dowdeswell (Hungary) Zoltán Kuhárszky	4–6, 5–7
