= Stefan Eriksson (tennis) =

Swedish tennis player

- Country (sports): Sweden
- Residence: Munich
- Born: 17 October 1963 (age 62) Enköping, Sweden
- Height: 1.93 m (6 ft 4 in)
- Plays: Right-handed
- Prize money: $105,682

Singles
- Career record: 19–34
- Career titles: 0
- Highest ranking: No. 72 (23 Mar 1987)

Grand Slam singles results
- French Open: 1R (1986, 1987)
- Wimbledon: 1R (1987)
- US Open: 1R (1986)

Doubles
- Career record: 10–25
- Career titles: 0
- Highest ranking: No. 110 (10 Feb 1986)

Grand Slam doubles results
- French Open: 1R (1986)

Stefan Eriksson (born 17 October 1963) is a former professional tennis player from Sweden.

== Career ==
Eriksson competed in four Grand Slam tournaments during his career but was unable to register a win. In the 1987 Wimbledon Championships he lost to future champion Stefan Edberg 0–6, 0–6, 0–6. It was the first ever Wimbledon match in the open era to be decided in just 18 games and first shutout at the tournament since 1947.

His best result on tour came at the Cologne tournament in 1986, when he finished runner-up. He upset world number nine Anders Järryd in the semi-finals. The Swede had two further wins over top 30 players that year, beating Slobodan Živojinović in Basel and Milan Šrejber in Vienna.

On the doubles circuit, Eriksson reached the quarterfinals at the Indianapolis Clay Court Championships in both 1985 and 1986, partnering Mikael Pernfors. He went further at Toulouse in 1985, making the semi-finals, with Peter Lundgren.

== Grand Prix career finals ==
=== Singles: 1 (0–1) ===
Result	W/L	Date	Tournament	Surface	Opponent	Score
Loss	0–1	Apr 1986	Cologne, West Germany	Hard	(Sweden) Jonas Svensson	7–6, 2–6, 2–6

== Challenger titles ==
=== Singles: (1) ===
No.	Year	Tournament	Surface	Opponent	Score
1.	1987	Cherbourg, France	Hard	(United States) Jim Pugh	6–3, 6–0

=== Doubles: (1) ===
No.	Year	Tournament	Surface	Partner	Opponents	Score
1.	1985	Helsinki, Finland	Hard	(Sweden) Ronnie Båthman	(Denmark) Morten Christensen (West Germany) Patrik Kühnen	6–4, 3–6, 6–4
