= Jonas Svensson (tennis) =

Swedish tennis player

Jonas Bengt Svensson
- Country (sports): Sweden
- Residence: Monte Carlo, Monaco
- Born: 21 October 1966 (age 60) Gothenburg, Sweden
- Height: 1.88 m (6 ft 2 in)
- Turned pro: 1985
- Retired: 1995
- Plays: Right-handed (two-handed backhand)
- Coach: Tim Klein
- Prize money: $2,439,702

Singles
- Career record: 258–204
- Career titles: 5
- Highest ranking: No. 10 (25 March 1991)

Grand Slam singles results
- Australian Open: QF (1989)
- French Open: SF (1988, 1990)
- Wimbledon: 3R (1987, 1988, 1989, 1990)
- US Open: 4R (1987)

Other tournaments
- Grand Slam Cup: 1R (1990)

Doubles
- Career record: 55–101
- Career titles: 0
- Highest ranking: No. 49 (6 April 1987)

Grand Slam doubles results
- Australian Open: QF (1988)
- French Open: 2R (1987)
- Wimbledon: 1R (1986, 1987, 1988)
- US Open: 2R (1991)

Mixed doubles
- Career record: 1–1
- Career titles: 0

Grand Slam mixed doubles results
- French Open: 2R (1987)

Jonas Bengt Svensson (Swedish pronunciation: [ˈjǔːnas ˈsvɛ̌nːsɔn]; born 21 October 1966) is a former professional tennis player from Sweden.

During his career, Svensson was a French Open semi-finalist twice (in 1988 and 1990) both times as unseeded player. In the 1988 French Open he defeated Ivan Lendl in the quarters and lost to Henri Leconte in the semis. In the 1990 French Open he defeated Sergi Bruguera in 5 sets in the 2nd round, who had earlier defeated Stefan Edberg, the top seed in the 1st round. He lost to Andre Agassi in the semis. In the 1989 Australian Open he defeated Boris Becker in the 4th round.

He won five top-level singles titles and reached a career-high singles ranking of world No. 10.

He later married Swedish hurdler Frida Svensson.

== Career finals ==
=== Singles: 14 (5 wins, 9 losses) ===
Legend
Grand Slam tournaments (0–0)
ATP Masters Series (0–0)
ATP Championship Series (0–1)
ATP Tour (5–8)

Result	W/L	Date	Tournament	Surface	Opponent	Score
Win	1–0	Apr 1986	Cologne, West Germany	Hard (i)	(Sweden) Stefan Eriksson	6–7, 6–2, 6–2
Loss	1–1	Sep 1986	Stuttgart Outdoor, West Germany	Clay	(Argentina) Martín Jaite	5–7, 2–6
Loss	1–2	Nov 1986	Wembley, U.K.	Carpet	(France) Yannick Noah	2–6, 3–6, 7–6^{(14–12)}, 6–4, 5–7
Win	2–2	Oct 1987	Vienna, Austria	Hard (i)	(Israel) Amos Mansdorf	1–6, 1–6, 6–2, 6–3, 7–5
Loss	2–3	Nov 1987	Stockholm, Sweden	Hard (i)	(Sweden) Stefan Edberg	5–7, 2–6, 6–4, 4–6
Win	3–3	Feb 1988	Metz, France	Carpet	(Netherlands) Michiel Schapers	6–2, 6–4
Loss	3–4	May 1988	Munich, West Germany	Clay	(Argentina) Guillermo Pérez Roldán	5–7, 3–6
Loss	3–5	Nov 1988	Wembley, U.K.	Carpet	(Switzerland) Jakob Hlasek	7–6^{(7–4)}, 6–3, 4–6, 0–6, 5–7
Loss	3–6	Mar 1990	Rotterdam, Netherlands	Carpet	(United States) Brad Gilbert	1–6, 3–6
Win	4–6	Oct 1990	Toulouse, France	Hard (i)	(France) Fabrice Santoro	7–6^{(7–5)}, 6–2
Loss	4–7	Feb 1991	Stuttgart Indoor, Germany	Carpet	(Sweden) Stefan Edberg	2–6, 6–3, 5–7, 2–6
Win	5–7	Mar 1991	Copenhagen, Denmark	Carpet	(Sweden) Anders Järryd	6–7^{(5–7)}, 6–2, 6–2
Loss	5–8	Mar 1993	Zaragoza, Spain	Carpet	(Czech Republic) Karel Nováček	6–3, 2–6, 1–6
Loss	5–9	Oct 1993	Kuala Lumpur-2, Malaysia	Hard	(United States) Michael Chang	0–6, 4–6

== Singles performance timeline ==
Key
W	F	SF	QF	#R	RR	Q#	DNQ	A	NH

(W) winner; (F) finalist; (SF) semifinalist; (QF) quarterfinalist; (#R) rounds 4, 3, 2, 1; (RR) round-robin stage; (Q#) qualification round; (DNQ) did not qualify; (A) absent; (NH) not held; (SR) strike rate (events won / competed); (W–L) win–loss record.

Tournament	1985	1986	1987	1988	1989	1990	1991	1992	1993	1994	SR	W–L
Grand Slam tournaments
Australian Open	1R	NH	A	4R	QF	4R	3R	2R	2R	3R	0 / 8	16–8
French Open	A	1R	2R	SF	2R	SF	A	1R	3R	A	0 / 7	14–7
Wimbledon	A	2R	3R	3R	3R	3R	A	A	1R	A	0 / 6	9–6
US Open	A	3R	4R	2R	1R	2R	2R	3R	2R	1R	0 / 9	11–9
Win–loss	0–1	3–3	6–3	11–4	7–4	11–4	3–2	3–3	4–4	2–2	0 / 30	50–30
ATP Masters Series
Indian Wells	Tournaments Were Not Masters Series Events Before 1990					A	A	A	A	A	0 / 0	0–0
Miami	Tournaments Were Not Masters Series Events Before 1990					A	A	A	A	A	0 / 0	0–0
Monte Carlo	Tournaments Were Not Masters Series Events Before 1990					2R	QF	1R	QF	1R	0 / 5	6–5
Rome	Tournaments Were Not Masters Series Events Before 1990					3R	2R	1R	1R	1R	0 / 5	3–5
Hamburg	Tournaments Were Not Masters Series Events Before 1990					1R	2R	A	2R	A	0 / 3	1–3
Canada	Tournaments Were Not Masters Series Events Before 1990					A	A	A	A	A	0 / 0	0–0
Cincinnati	Tournaments Were Not Masters Series Events Before 1990					1R	1R	A	A	A	0 / 2	0–2
Stockholm	Tournaments Were Not Masters Series Events Before 1990					2R	1R	2R	QF	1R	0 / 5	4–5
Paris	Tournaments Were Not Masters Series Events Before 1990					SF	SF	A	2R	A	0 / 3	7–3
Win–loss	Tournaments Were Not Masters Series Events Before 1990					6–6	6–6	1–3	8–5	0–3	0 / 23	21–23
Ranking	103	21	30	22	41	11	29	81	33	183		
