= Cologne Grand Prix =

Men's tennis tournament held in Cologne, Germany

Defunct tennis tournament
- Event name: Lacoste Cup; Cologne Cup
- Tour: Grand Prix circuit
- Founded: 1976
- Abolished: 1986
- Editions: 11
- Location: Cologne, West Germany
- Surface: Carpet / indoors

The Cologne Grand Prix was a men's tennis tournament held in Cologne, West Germany, between 1976 and 1986. Also known as the Cologne Indoor Open tournament was a part of the Grand Prix tennis circuit for male tennis players and was played on indoor carpet courts.

== Finals ==
=== Singles ===
Year	Champion	Runner-up	Score
1976	(United States) Jimmy Connors	(South Africa) Frew McMillan	6–2, 6–3
1977	(Sweden) Björn Borg	(Poland) Wojciech Fibak	2–6, 7–5, 6–3
1978	(Poland) Wojciech Fibak	(India) Vijay Amritraj	6–2, 0–1, RET.
1979	(United States) Gene Mayer	(Poland) Wojciech Fibak	6–3, 3–6, 6–1
1980	(United States) Robert Lutz	(United States) Nick Saviano	6–4, 6–0
1981	(Czechoslovakia) Ivan Lendl	(United States) Sandy Mayer	6–3, 6–3
1982	(South Africa) Kevin Curren	(Israel) Shlomo Glickstein	2–6, 6–2, 6–3
1983	(Republic of Ireland) Matt Doyle	(West Germany) Hans-Dieter Beutel	1–6, 6–1, 6–2
1984	(Sweden) Joakim Nyström	(Czechoslovakia) Miloslav Mečíř	7–6, 6–2
1985	(Sweden) Peter Lundgren	(India) Ramesh Krishnan	6–3, 6–2
1986	(Sweden) Jonas Svensson	(Sweden) Stefan Eriksson	6–7, 6–2, 6–2

=== Doubles ===
Year	Champions	Runner-up	Score
1976	(South Africa) Bob Hewitt (South Africa) Frew McMillan	(Rhodesia) Colin Dowdeswell (United States) Mike Estep	6–1, 3–6, 7–6
1977	(South Africa) Bob Hewitt (South Africa) Frew McMillan	(United States) Fred McNair (United States) Sherwood Stewart	6–3, 7–5
1978	(United States) Peter Fleming (United States) John McEnroe	(South Africa) Bob Hewitt (South Africa) Frew McMillan	6–3, 6–2
1979	(United States) Gene Mayer (United States) Stan Smith	(Switzerland) Heinz Günthardt (Czechoslovakia) Pavel Složil	6–3, 6–4
1980	(South Africa) Bernard Mitton (Zimbabwe) Andrew Pattison	(Czechoslovakia) Jan Kodeš (Czechoslovakia) Tomáš Šmíd	6–4, 6–1
1981	(United States) Sandy Mayer (South Africa) Frew McMillan	(Czechoslovakia) Jan Kodeš (West Germany) Karl Meiler	6–0, 6–3
1982	(Uruguay) José Luis Damiani (Brazil) Carlos Kirmayr	(West Germany) Hans-Dieter Beutel (West Germany) Christoph Zipf	6–2, 3–6, 7–5
1983	(United States) Nick Saviano (Romania) Florin Segărceanu	(United States) Paul Annacone (United States) Eric Korita	6–3, 6–4
1984	(Poland) Wojciech Fibak (United States) Sandy Mayer	(Sweden) Jan Gunnarsson (Sweden) Joakim Nyström	6–1, 6–3
1985	(Austria) Alex Antonitsch (Netherlands) Michiel Schapers	(Sweden) Jan Gunnarsson (Sweden) Peter Lundgren	6–4, 7–5
1986	(New Zealand) Kelly Evernden (United States) Chip Hooper	(Sweden) Jan Gunnarsson (Sweden) Peter Lundgren	6–4, 6–7, 6–3

- 1981 doubles results not included on ATP website

== See also ==
- Cologne Open (1992)
- Bett1Hulks Indoors (2020)
- Bett1Hulks Championship (2020)
