= 1993 in tennis =

This page covers all the important events in the sport of tennis in 1993. It provides the results of notable tournaments throughout the year on both the ATP and WTA Tours, the Davis Cup, and the Fed Cup.

== ITF ==
=== Grand Slam events ===
==== Singles ====
	Championship	Champions	Finalists	Score in the final
Men	Australian Open	(United States) Jim Courier	(Sweden) Stefan Edberg	6–2, 6–1, 2–6, 7–5 (Note: It was Courier's 4th and last career Grand Slam title and his 2nd Australian Open title.)
Men	French Open	(Spain) Sergi Bruguera	(United States) Jim Courier	6–4, 2–6, 6–2, 3–6, 6–3 (Note: It was Bruguera's 2nd title of the year, and his 8th overall. It was his 1st career Grand Slam title. Bruguera notably)
Men	Wimbledon	(United States) Pete Sampras	(United States) Jim Courier	7–6^{(7–3)}, 7–6^{(8–6)}, 3–6, 6–3 (Note: It was Sampras' 2nd career Grand Slam singles title and his 1st Wimbledon title.)
Men	US Open	(United States) Pete Sampras	(France) Cédric Pioline	6–4, 6–4, 6–3 (Note: It was Sampras's 3rd career Grand Slam title and his 2nd US Open title.)
Women	Australian Open	(Federal Republic of Yugoslavia) Monica Seles	(Germany) Steffi Graf	4–6, 6–3, 6–2 (Note: It was Seles' 8th career Grand Slam title and her 3rd Australian Open title.)
Women	French Open	(Germany) Steffi Graf	(United States) Mary Joe Fernández	4–6, 6–2, 6–4 (Note: It was Graf's 4th title of the year, and her 73rd overall. It was her 12th career Grand Slam title, and her 3rd French Open title.)
Women	Wimbledon	(Germany) Steffi Graf	(Czech Republic) Jana Novotná	7–6^{(8–6)}, 1–6, 6–4 (Note: It was Graf's 13th career Grand Slam singles title and her 5th Wimbledon title.)
Women	US Open	(Germany) Steffi Graf	(Czech Republic) Helena Suková	6–3, 6–3 (Note: It was Graf's 15th career Grand Slam title and her 3rd US Open title.)

==== Doubles ====
	Championship	Champions	Finalists	Score in the final
Men	Australian Open	(South Africa) Danie Visser (Australia) Laurie Warder	(Australia) John Fitzgerald (Sweden) Anders Järryd	6–4, 6–3, 6–4 (Note: It was Visser's 3rd and last career Grand Slam title and his 2nd Australian Open title. It was Warder's only career Grand Slam title.)
Men	French Open	(United States) Luke Jensen (United States) Murphy Jensen	(Germany) Marc-Kevin Goellner (Germany) David Prinosil	6–4, 6–7^{(4–7)}, 6–4
Men	Wimbledon	(Australia) Todd Woodbridge (Australia) Mark Woodforde	(Canada) Grant Connell (United States) Patrick Galbraith	7–5, 6–3, 7–6^{(7–4)} (Note: It was Woodbridge's 4th career Grand Slam title and his 1st Wimbledon title. It was Woodforde's 6th career Grand Slam title and his 1st Wimbledon title.)
Men	US Open	(United States) Ken Flach (United States) Rick Leach	(Czech Republic) Martin Damm (Czech Republic) Karel Nováček	6–7^{(3–7)}, 6–4, 6–2 (Note: It was Flach's 6th and last career Grand Slam title and his 2nd US Open title. It was Leach's 5th career Grand Slam title and his 1st US Open title.)
Women	Australian Open	(United States) Gigi Fernández (Belarus) Natasha Zvereva	(United States) Pam Shriver (Australia) Elizabeth Smylie	6–4, 6–3 (Note: It was Fernández's 7th career Grand Slam title and her 1st Australian Open title. It was Zvereva's 7th career Grand Slam title and her 1st Australian Open title.)
Women	French Open	(United States) Gigi Fernández (Belarus) Natalia Zvereva	(Czech Republic) Jana Novotná (Latvia) Larisa Savchenko-Neiland	6–3, 7–5
Women	Wimbledon	(United States) Gigi Fernández (Belarus) Natasha Zvereva	(Czech Republic) Jana Novotná (Latvia) Larisa Savchenko-Neiland	6–4, 6–7^{(4–7)}, 6–4 (Note: It was Fernández's 9th career Grand Slam title and her 2nd Wimbledon title. It was Zvereva's 10th career Grand Slam title and her 3rd Wimbledon title.)
Women	US Open	(Spain) Arantxa Sánchez (Czech Republic) Helena Suková	(South Africa) Amanda Coetzer (Argentina) Inés Gorrochategui	6–4, 6–2 (Note: It was Sánchez Vicario's 6th career Grand Slam title and her 1st US Open title. It was Suková's 9th career Grand Slam title and her 2nd US Open title.)
Mixed	Australian Open	(Spain) Arantxa Sánchez (Australia) Todd Woodbridge	(United States) Zina Garrison-Jackson (United States) Rick Leach	7–5, 6–4 (Note: It was Sánchez Vicario's 5th career Grand Slam title and her 2nd Australian Open title. It was Woodbridge's 3rd career Grand Slam title and his 2nd Australian Open title.)
Mixed	French Open	(Russia) Eugenia Maniokova (Russia) Andrei Olhovskiy	(South Africa) Elna Reinach (South Africa) Danie Visser	6–2, 4–6, 6–4
Mixed	Wimbledon	(United States) Martina Navratilova (Australia) Mark Woodforde	(Netherlands) Manon Bollegraf (Netherlands) Tom Nijssen	6–3, 6–4 (Note: It was Woodforde's 7th career Grand Slam title and his 2nd Wimbledon title. It was Navratilova's 55th career Grand Slam title and her 18th Wimbledon title.)
Mixed	US Open	(Czech Republic) Helena Suková (Australia) Todd Woodbridge	(United States) Martina Navratilova (Australia) Mark Woodforde	6–3, 7–6^{(8–6)} (Note: It was Suková's 10th career Grand Slam title and her 3rd and last US Open title. It was Woodbridge's 5th career Grand Slam title and his 2nd US Open title.)

== Davis Cup ==
First round 26–28 March
Melbourne, Australia (grass)
United States	1
Australia	4
Modena, Italy (indoor carpet)
Italy	4
Brazil	1
Vienna, Austria (indoor clay)
France	4
Austria	1
Calcutta, India (grass)
Switzerland	2
India	3
Barcelona, Spain (clay)
Netherlands	3
Spain	2
Kalmar, Sweden (indoor carpet)
Cuba	0
Sweden	5
Aarhus, Denmark (indoor carpet)
Denmark	1
Czech Republic	4
Moscow, Russia (indoor carpet)
Russia	1
Germany	4

Quarterfinals; 16–18 July
Florence, Italy (clay)
Australia	3
Italy	2
Fréjus, France (clay)
France	2
India	3
The Hague, Netherlands (clay)
Netherlands	1
Sweden	4
Halle, Germany (grass)
Czech Republic	1
Germany	4

Semifinals; 24–26 September
Chandigarh, India (grass)
Australia	5
India	0
Borlänge, Sweden (indoor clay)
Sweden	0
Germany	5

Final; 3–5 December
Düsseldorf, Germany (indoor clay)
Australia	1
Germany	4

== Fed Cup ==
First Round19–20 July
Germany	1
Australia	2
Austria	1
Denmark	2
Q	Chile	0
Finland	3
Q	Colombia	0
Japan	3
Argentina	3
Q	New Zealand	0
South Korea	1
Bulgaria	2
Q	China	2
Q	Peru	1
Switzerland	0
United States	3
Czech Republic	2
South Africa	1
Italy	3
Q	Israel	0
Sweden	3
Q	Uruguay	0
Canada	1
France	2
Netherlands	3
Q	Croatia	0
Q	Latvia	2
Q	Belgium	1
Poland	1
Q	Indonesia	2
Q	Great Britain	0
Spain	3

Second Round21 July
Australia	3
Denmark	0
Finland	2
Japan	1
Argentina	2
Bulgaria	1
Q	China	1
United States	2
Czech Republic	2
Italy	1
Sweden	0
France	3
Netherlands	3
Q	Latvia	0
Q	Indonesia	0
Spain	3

Quarterfinals22–23 July
Australia	3
Finland	0
Argentina	2
United States	1
Czech Republic	0
France	3
Netherlands	0
Spain	3

Semifinals24 July
Australia	2
Argentina	1
France	1
Spain	2

Final25 July
Australia	0
Spain	3
