= 1981 Paris Open – Doubles =

Doubles
- 1981 Paris Open
- 1980 Champions: (Italy) Paolo Bertolucci (Italy) Adriano Panatta

Final
- Champions: (Romania) Ilie Năstase (France) Yannick Noah
- Runners-up: (United Kingdom) Andrew Jarrett (United Kingdom) Jonathan Smith
- Score: 6–4, 6–4

Details
- Draw: 16
- Seeds: 4

Events
Singles	Doubles
← 1980 ·	Paris Open	· 1982 →

Paolo Bertolucci and Adriano Panatta were the defending champions but lost in the first round to Jérôme Potier and Thierry Tulasne.

Ilie Năstase and Yannick Noah won in the final 6–4, 6–4 against Andrew Jarrett and Jonathan Smith.

== Seeds ==
Champion seeds are indicated in bold text while text in italics indicates the round in which those seeds were eliminated.

1. (Italy) Paolo Bertolucci / (Italy) Adriano Panatta (first round)
2. (Romania) **Ilie Năstase** / (France) **Yannick Noah (champions)**
3. (United States) Eric Fromm / (United States) Cary Leeds (quarterfinals)
4. (United States) Tim Mayotte / (United States) Mark Vines (semifinals)

== Draw ==
=== Key ===
- Q = Qualifier
- WC = Wild card
- LL = Lucky loser
- Alt = Alternate
- SE = Special exempt
- PR = Protected ranking
- ITF = ITF entry
- JE = Junior exempt
- w/o = Walkover
- r = Retired
- d = Defaulted
- SR = Special ranking

First round
1	(Italy) P Bertolucci (Italy) A Panatta	3	6
(France) **J Potier** (France) **T Tulasne**	**6**	**7**
(United Kingdom) **A Jarrett** (United Kingdom) **J Smith**	**6**	**6**
(France) P Torre (Belgium) J Vanlangendonck	4	1
4	(United States) **T Mayotte** (United States) **M Vines**	**6**	**6**
(France) B Fritz (France) C Roger-Vasselin	2	3
(France) **C Freyss** (United States) **G Núñez**	**6**	**6**
(France) E Deblicker (France) P Proisy	1	3
(France) **L Courteau** (France) **H Leconte**	**6**	**6**
(France) J-L Haillet (France) P Portes	3	4
(United Kingdom) J Feaver (United Kingdom) R Lewis	**6**	6	2
3	(United States) **E Fromm** (United States) **C Leeds**	4	**7**	**6**
(United States) **B Gottfried** (United States) **H Solomon**	**6**	**6**
(Greece) A Anastopaulo (United States) J van Nostrand	3	1
(United States) D Siegler (West Germany) C Zipf	3	4
2	(Romania) **I Nastase** (France) **Y Noah**	**6**	**6**

Quarterfinals
(France) J Potier (France) T Tulasne	3	**7**	1
(United Kingdom) **A Jarrett** (United Kingdom) **J Smith**	**6**	5	**6**
4	(United States) **T Mayotte** (United States) **M Vines**	**6**	**6**
(France) C Freyss (United States) G Núñez	2	3
(France) **L Courteau** (France) **H Leconte**	**6**	**6**
3	(United States) E Fromm (United States) C Leeds	1	2
(United States) B Gottfried (United States) H Solomon	4	2
2	(Romania) **I Nastase** (France) **Y Noah**	**6**	**6**

Semifinals
(United Kingdom) **A Jarrett** (United Kingdom) **J Smith**	**6**	**7**
4	(United States) T Mayotte (United States) M Vines	4	5
(France) L Courteau (France) H Leconte	2	4
2	(Romania) **I Nastase** (France) **Y Noah**	**6**	**6**

Final
(United Kingdom) Andrew Jarrett (United Kingdom) Jonathan Smith	4	4
2	(Romania) **Ilie Năstase** (France) **Yannick Noah**	**6**	**6**
