= 1980 Paris Open – Singles =

Singles
- 1980 Paris Open

Final
- Champion: (United States) Brian Gottfried
- Runner-up: (Italy) Adriano Panatta
- Score: 4–6, 6–3, 6–1, 7–6

Details
- Draw: 32
- Seeds: 8

Events
Singles	Doubles
← 1979 ·	Paris Open	· 1981 →

Harold Solomon was the defending champion but did not compete that year.

Brian Gottfried won in the final 4–6, 6–3, 6–1, 7–6 against Adriano Panatta.

== Seeds ==
A champion seed is indicated in bold text while text in italics indicates the round in which that seed was eliminated.

1. (United States) **Brian Gottfried (champion)**
2. (France) Yannick Noah (second round)
3. (Italy) Corrado Barazzutti (second round, retired)
4. (Italy) Adriano Panatta (final)
5. (France) Pascal Portes (quarterfinals)
6. (Australia) Paul Kronk (semifinals)
7. (United Kingdom) Mark Cox (quarterfinals)
8. (France) Jean-François Caujolle (second round)

== Draw ==
=== Key ===
- Q = Qualifier
- WC = Wild card
- LL = Lucky loser
- Alt = Alternate
- SE = Special exempt
- PR = Protected ranking
- ITF = ITF entry
- JE = Junior exempt
- w/o = Walkover
- r = Retired
- d = Defaulted
- SR = Special ranking
- NB: The Final was the best of 5 sets while all other rounds were the best of 3 sets.

=== Final ===
Final
1	(United States) **Brian Gottfried**	4	**6**	**6**	**7**
4	(Italy) Adriano Panatta	**6**	3	1	6

=== Section 1 ===
First round
1	(United States) **B Gottfried**	**6**	**6**
(France) J Potier	2	3
Q	(Austria) **F Krajcik**	1	**6**	**6**
(France) D Bedel	**6**	4	3
(United States) **T Cain**	**6**	3	**6**
(United Kingdom) R Lewis	3	**6**	1
(France) B Fritz	**6**	0	3
7	(United Kingdom) **M Cox**	4	**6**	**6**
3	(Italy) **C Barazzutti**	**6**	**6**
(South Africa) R Moore	3	2
(France) **J-L Haillet**	**7**	**7**
Q	(France) D Naegelen	6	6
(France) **R Brunet**	**6**	**6**
(France) T Tulasne	4	0
(Sweden) S Simonsson	5	5
6	(Australia) **P Kronk**	**7**	**7**

Second round
1	(United States) **B Gottfried**	**6**	**6**
Q	(Austria) F Krajcik	1	1
(United States) T Cain	6	6
7	(United Kingdom) **M Cox**	**7**	**7**
3	(Italy) C Barazzutti	4^{r}
(France) **J-L Haillet**	3
(France) R Brunet	**6**	3	4
6	(Australia) **P Kronk**	3	**6**	**6**

Quarterfinals
1	(United States) **B Gottfried**	**6**	**6**
7	(United Kingdom) M Cox	4	2
(France) J-L Haillet	**6**	2	3
6	(Australia) **P Kronk**	4	**6**	**6**

Semifinals
1	(United States) **B Gottfried**	**6**	**6**
6	(Australia) P Kronk	2	1

=== Section 2 ===
First round
8	(France) **J-F Caujolle**	**6**	**7**
(Spain) R Vizcaino	2	6
(Italy) **P Bertolucci**	**6**	**6**
(United Kingdom) R Drysdale	2	2
(Spain) **M Mir**	5	**7**	**6**
(Italy) E Vattuone	**7**	6	3
(France) C Casa	5	2
4	(Italy) **A Panatta**	**7**	**6**
5	(France) **P Portes**	**6**	**6**
(France) H Leconte	3	3
(South Africa) **E Edwards**	**6**	**6**
(United States) E Fromm	1	1
Q	(Spain) **J López-Maeso**	**6**	**6**
(France) P Dominguez	3	3
(France) C Freyss	3	2
2	(France) **Y Noah**	**6**	**6**

Second round
8	(France) J-F Caujolle	3	5
(Italy) **P Bertolucci**	**6**	**7**
(Spain) M Mir	5	2
4	(Italy) **A Panatta**	**7**	**6**
5	(France) **P Portes**	3	**6**	**6**
(South Africa) E Edwards	**6**	2	1
Q	(Spain) **J López-Maeso**	5	**7**	**6**
2	(France) Y Noah	**7**	5	4

Quarterfinals
(Italy) P Bertolucci	3	2
4	(Italy) **A Panatta**	**6**	**6**
5	(France) P Portes	3	4
Q	(Spain) **J López-Maeso**	**6**	**6**

Semifinals
4	(Italy) **A Panatta**	**6**	**6**
Q	(Spain) J López-Maeso	1	2
