= 1981 Paris Open – Singles =

Singles
- 1981 Paris Open

Final
- Champion: (United States) Mark Vines
- Runner-up: (France) Pascal Portes
- Score: 6–2, 6–4, 6–3

Details
- Draw: 32
- Seeds: 8

Events
Singles	Doubles
← 1980 ·	Paris Open	· 1982 →

Brian Gottfried was the defending champion but lost in the quarterfinals to Stan Smith.

Mark Vines won in the final 6–2, 6–4, 6–3 against Pascal Portes.

== Seeds ==
A champion seed is indicated in bold text while text in italics indicates the round in which that seed was eliminated.

1. (France) Yannick Noah (semifinals)
2. (United States) Brian Gottfried (quarterfinals)
3. (South Africa) Johan Kriek (second round)
4. (United States) Harold Solomon (first round)
5. (Italy) Adriano Panatta (first round)
6. (United States) Stan Smith (semifinals)
7. (France) Pascal Portes (final)
8. (Romania) Ilie Năstase (quarterfinals)

== Draw ==
=== Key ===
- Q = Qualifier
- WC = Wild card
- LL = Lucky loser
- Alt = Alternate
- SE = Special exempt
- PR = Protected ranking
- ITF = ITF entry
- JE = Junior exempt
- w/o = Walkover
- r = Retired
- d = Defaulted
- SR = Special ranking
- NB: The Final was the best of 5 sets while all other rounds were the best of 3 sets.

=== Final ===
Final
	(United States) **Mark Vines**	**6**	**6**	**6**
7	(France) Pascal Portes	2	4	3

=== Section 1 ===
First round
1	(France) **Y Noah**	**6**	5	**6**
(United Kingdom) M Cox	2	**7**	2
(United States) C Mayotte	1	5
(France) **E Deblicker**	**6**	**7**
(France) J-L Haillet	1	**6**	4
(West Germany) **C Zipf**	**6**	4	**6**
(Socialist Federal Republic of Yugoslavia) M Ostoja	5	4
8	(Romania) **I Năstase**	**7**	**6**
4	(United States) H Solomon	1	3
(United States) **M Vines**	**6**	**6**
(France) J-F Caujolle	1	3
(Italy) **P Bertolucci**	**6**	**6**
(France) C Freyss	6	4
(United States) **S Meister**	**7**	**6**
(United Kingdom) **R Lewis**	**6**	**6**
5	(Italy) A Panatta	3	3

Second round
1	(France) **Y Noah**	6	**6**	**6**
(France) E Deblicker	**7**	4	2
(West Germany) C Zipf	1	2
8	(Romania) **I Năstase**	**6**	**6**
(United States) **M Vines**	**6**	3	**6**
(Italy) P Bertolucci	4	**6**	2
(United States) S Meister	**6**	6	3
(United Kingdom) **R Lewis**	4	**7**	**6**

Quarterfinals
1	(France) **Y Noah**	2	**7**	**7**
8	(Romania) I Năstase	**6**	6	5
(United States) **M Vines**	4	**6**	**6**
(United Kingdom) R Lewis	**6**	3	2

Semifinals
1	(France) Y Noah	4	6
(United States) **M Vines**	**6**	**7**

=== Section 2 ===
First round
7	(France) **P Portes**	**6**	**6**
(United Kingdom) J Smith	3	4
(France) P Proisy	1	4
(France) **L Courteau**	**6**	**6**
(Belgium) J Vanlangendonck	2	2
(France) **J Potier**	**6**	**6**
(Zimbabwe) H Ismail	6	2
3	(South Africa) **J Kriek**	**7**	**6**
6	(United States) **S Smith**	**6**	**6**
(France) H Leconte	3	4
(France) P Torre	3	2
(United Kingdom) **J Feaver**	**6**	**6**
(United States) **D Siegler**	**6**	**6**
(France) B Fritz	3	1
(United States) E Fromm	6	3
2	(United States) **B Gottfried**	**7**	**6**

Second round
7	(France) **P Portes**	**6**	**6**
(France) L Courteau	1	1
(France) **J Potier**	**7**	**6**
3	(South Africa) J Kriek	6	3
6	(United States) **S Smith**	**7**	**7**
(United Kingdom) J Feaver	6	5
(United States) D Siegler	2	**6**	3
2	(United States) **B Gottfried**	**6**	4	**6**

Quarterfinals
7	(France) **P Portes**	**6**	**6**
(France) J Potier	1	0
6	(United States) **S Smith**	**7**	2	**15**
2	(United States) B Gottfried	6	**6**	13

Semifinals
7	(France) **P Portes**	3	**7**	**6**
6	(United States) S Smith	**6**	5	3
