= 1981 Paris Open =

Tennis tournament

- Date: 26 October – 1 November
- Edition: 12th
- Draw: 32S / 16D
- Prize money: $50,000
- Surface: Hard / indoor
- Location: Paris, France
- Venue: Palais omnisports de Paris-Bercy

Champions

Singles
- (United States) Mark Vines

Doubles
- (Romania) Ilie Năstase / (France) Yannick Noah
← 1980 ·	Paris Open	· 1982 →

The 1981 Paris Open was a men's Grand Prix tennis tournament played on indoor hard courts. It was the 12th edition of the Paris Open (later known as the Paris Masters). It took place at the Palais omnisports de Paris-Bercy in Paris, France from 26 October through 1 November 1981.

== Finals ==
=== Singles ===
(United States) Mark Vines defeated (France) Pascal Portes 6–2, 6–4, 6–3

- It was Vines's only singles title of his career.

=== Doubles ===
(Romania) Ilie Năstase / (France) Yannick Noah defeated (United Kingdom) Andrew Jarrett / (United Kingdom) Jonathan Smith 6–4, 6–4

- It was Nastase's 2nd title of the year and the 100th of his career. It was Noah's 4th title of the year and the 9th of his career.
