= 1982 Paris Open – Singles =

Singles
- 1982 Paris Open

Final
- Champion: (Poland) Wojciech Fibak
- Runner-up: (United States) Bill Scanlon
- Score: 6–2, 6–2, 6–2

Details
- Draw: 32
- Seeds: 8

Events
Singles	Doubles
← 1981 ·	Paris Open	· 1986 →

Mark Vines was the defending champion but lost in the first round to Bill Scanlon.

Wojciech Fibak won in the final 6–2, 6–2, 6–2 against Scanlon.

== Seeds ==
A champion seed is indicated in bold text while text in italics indicates the round in which that seed was eliminated.

1. (United States) Brian Gottfried (semifinals)
2. (United States) Mel Purcell (second round)
3. (Poland) **Wojciech Fibak (champion)**
4. (United States) Jay Lapidus (quarterfinals)
5. (Brazil) Marcos Hocevar (semifinals)
6. (United States) Eric Fromm (first round)
7. (United States) Bruce Manson (second round)
8. (United States) Bill Scanlon (final)

== Draw ==
=== Key ===
- Q = Qualifier
- WC = Wild card
- LL = Lucky loser
- Alt = Alternate
- SE = Special exempt
- PR = Protected ranking
- ITF = ITF entry
- JE = Junior exempt
- w/o = Walkover
- r = Retired
- d = Defaulted
- SR = Special ranking
- NB: The Final was the best of 5 sets while all other rounds were the best of 3 sets.

=== Final ===
Final
3	(Poland) **Wojciech Fibak**	**6**	**6**	**6**
8	(United States) Bill Scanlon	2	2	2

=== Section 1 ===
First round
1	(United States) **B Gottfried**	**6**	6	**6**
(United States) M De Palmer	2	**7**	2
Q	(Burkina Faso) A Jumatano	0	3
(United States) **H Solomon**	**6**	**6**
(United States) M Doyle	6	6
(France) **G Forget**	**7**	**7**
(France) C Roger-Vasselin	4	4
7	(United States) **B Manson**	**6**	**6**
3	(Poland) **W Fibak**	**6**	**7**
Q	(Austria) P Feigl	2	5
(Finland) L Palin	2	6
(Italy) **C Barazzutti**	**6**	**7**
(United States) E Iskersky	2	**7**	3
(France) **J Potier**	**6**	5	**6**
(United States) **S Smith**	**6**	**7**
6	(United States) E Fromm	1	4

Second round
1	(United States) **B Gottfried**	**6**	5	**6**
(United States) H Solomon	2	**7**	0
(France) **G Forget**	**7**	**6**
7	(United States) B Manson	6	4
3	(Poland) **W Fibak**	**6**	**6**
(Italy) C Barazzutti	1	2
(France) J Potier	4	2
(United States) **S Smith**	**6**	**6**

Quarterfinals
1	(United States) **B Gottfried**	**7**	**6**
(France) G Forget	5	2
3	(Poland) **W Fibak**	**6**	**7**
(United States) S Smith	2	6

Semifinals
1	(United States) B Gottfried	3	**7**	0
3	(Poland) **W Fibak**	**6**	6	**6**

=== Section 2 ===
First round
5	(Brazil) **M Hocevar**	**6**	**6**
(France) B Fritz	4	3
(France) **P Portes**	**6**	3	**6**
(Uruguay) D Pérez	1	**6**	1
(United Kingdom) R Lewis	3	**7**	3
Q	(France) **P Deniau**	**6**	6	**6**
(South Africa) D Visser	4	2
4	(United States) **J Lapidus**	**6**	**6**
8	(United States) **B Scanlon**	**6**	**6**
(United States) M Vines	3	4
(United States) T Moor	4	4
(Socialist Federal Republic of Yugoslavia) **Ž Franulović**	**6**	**6**
(Brazil) J Soares	2	3
(Italy) **A Panatta**	**6**	**6**
(Iran) M Bahrami	4	1
2	(United States) **M Purcell**	**6**	**6**

Second round
5	(Brazil) **M Hocevar**	**6**	1	**6**
(France) P Portes	3	**6**	2
Q	(France) P Deniau	2	4
4	(United States) **J Lapidus**	**6**	**6**
8	(United States) **B Scanlon**	**6**	4	**6**
(Socialist Federal Republic of Yugoslavia) Ž Franulović	2	**6**	0
(Italy) **A Panatta**	**6**	**6**
2	(United States) M Purcell	2	4

Quarterfinals
5	(Brazil) **M Hocevar**	**6**	4	**8**
4	(United States) J Lapidus	4	**6**	6
8	(United States) **B Scanlon**	**6**	**6**
(Italy) A Panatta	0	3

Semifinals
5	(Brazil) M Hocevar	0	**6**	2
8	(United States) **B Scanlon**	**6**	4	**6**
