= 1980 Paris Open – Doubles =

Doubles
- 1980 Paris Open
- 1979 Champions: (France) Jean-Louis Haillet (France) Gilles Moretton

Final
- Champions: (Italy) Paolo Bertolucci (Italy) Adriano Panatta
- Runners-up: (United States) Brian Gottfried (South Africa) Raymond Moore
- Score: 6–4, 6–4

Details
- Draw: 16
- Seeds: 4

Events
Singles	Doubles
- Paris Open

Jean-Louis Haillet and Gilles Moretton were the defending champions but only Moretton competed that year with Dominique Bedel.

Bedel and Moretton lost in the quarterfinals to Paolo Bertolucci and Adriano Panatta.

Bertolucci and Panatta won in the final 6–4, 6–4 against Brian Gottfried and Raymond Moore.

== Seeds ==
Champion seeds are indicated in bold text while text in italics indicates the round in which those seeds were eliminated.

1. (Italy) **Paolo Bertolucci** / (Italy) **Adriano Panatta (champions)**
2. (United States) Brian Gottfried / (South Africa) Raymond Moore (final)
3. (United States) Tom Cain / (South Africa) Eddie Edwards (semifinals)
4. (France) Eric Deblicker / (France) Christophe Roger-Vasselin (first round)

== Draw ==
Key

- Q = Qualifier
- WC = Wild card
- LL = Lucky loser
- Alt = Alternate
- ITF = ITF entry
- PR = Protected ranking
- SR = Special ranking
- SE = Special exempt
- JE = Junior exempt
- JR = Junior Accelerator Programme entrant
- CO = College Accelerator Programme entrant
- NG = Next Gen Accelerator Program entrant
- w/o = Walkover
- r = Retired
- d = Defaulted

First round
1	(Italy) **P Bertolucci** (Italy) **A Panatta**	**6**	**7**
(France) P Dominguez (France) D Naegelen	2	5
(France) **D Bedel** (France) **G Moretton**	**6**	**6**
(France) J Potier (France) T Tulasne	4	3
3	(United States) **T Cain** (South Africa) **E Edwards**	**6**	3	**6**
(United Kingdom) M Cox (United Kingdom) A Jarrett	2	**6**	4
(Spain) **M Mir** (Italy) **E Vattuone**	6	**6**	**6**
(United Kingdom) R Drysdale (United Kingdom) R Lewis	**7**	3	2
(France) **Y Noah** (France) **P Portes**	**6**	**7**
(United States) M Doyle (Austria) F Krajcik	4	5
(United States) **E Fromm** (United States) **C Leeds**	**6**	**6**
4	(France) E Deblicker (France) C Roger-Vasselin	2	2
(Spain) **J López-Maeso** (United States) G Núñez	w/o
(Italy) C Barazzutti (Romania) I Nastase
(France) B Fritz (France) H Leconte	0	**6**	3
2	(United States) **B Gottfried** (South Africa) **R Moore**	**6**	2	**6**

Quarterfinals
1	(Italy) **P Bertolucci** (Italy) **A Panatta**	**6**	**6**
(France) D Bedel (France) G Moretton	3	3
3	(United States) **T Cain** (South Africa) **E Edwards**	**6**	6	**6**
(Spain) M Mir (Italy) E Vattuone	3	**7**	0
(France) Y Noah (France) P Portes	3	5
(United States) **E Fromm** (United States) **C Leeds**	**6**	**7**
(Spain) J López-Maeso (United States) G Núñez	0	1
2	(United States) **B Gottfried** (South Africa) **R Moore**	**6**	**6**

Semifinals
1	(Italy) **P Bertolucci** (Italy) **A Panatta**	**6**	2	**6**
3	(United States) T Cain (South Africa) E Edwards	4	**6**	3
(United States) E Fromm (United States) C Leeds	3	4
2	(United States) **B Gottfried** (South Africa) **R Moore**	**6**	**6**

Final
1	(Italy) **Paolo Bertolucci** (Italy) **Adriano Panatta**	**6**	**6**
2	(United States) Brian Gottfried (South Africa) Raymond Moore	4	4
