= 1977 Florence International =

- Date: 18–24 April
- Edition: 5th
- Category: Independent
- Draw: 32S / 16D
- Surface: Clay / outdoor
- Location: Florence, Italy

Champions

Singles
- (Italy) Paolo Bertolucci

Doubles
- (New Zealand) Chris Lewis / (New Zealand) Russell Simpson
- ATP Florence

The 1977 Florence International was a men's tennis tournament played on outdoor clay courts in Florence, Italy. It was an independent event i.e. not part of the 1977 Colgate-Palmolive Grand Prix circuit. It was the fifth edition of the tournament and was played from 18 April until 24 April 1977. Second-seeded Paolo Bertolucci won the singles title.

== Finals ==
=== Singles ===
(Italy) Paolo Bertolucci defeated (United Kingdom) John Feaver 6–4, 6–1, 7–5

- It was Bertolucci's 1st singles title of the yea and the 4th of his career.

=== Doubles ===
(New Zealand) Chris Lewis / (New Zealand) Russell Simpson defeated (Colombia) Iván Molina / (Colombia) Jairo Velasco Sr. 2–6, 7–6, 6–2

- It was Lewis' 2nd and last doubles title of the year and the 2nd of his career. It was Simpson's 2nd and last doubles title of the year and the 2nd of his career
