= Krajčík =

Krajčík (Krajcik) is a Slovak-language occupational surname, meaning 'tailor'. Notable people with the surname include:

- Filip Krajcik (1955–2001), Austrian tennis player
- Josh Krajcik, American singer-songwriter
- Juraj Krajčík (2003–2022), Slovak neo-fascist terrorist
- Matej Krajčík (born 1978), Slovak footballer
