= 1986 Paris Open – Doubles =

Tennis final

Doubles
- 1986 Paris Open

Final
- Champions: (United States) Peter Fleming (United States) John McEnroe
- Runners-up: (Iran) Mansour Bahrami (Uruguay) Diego Pérez
- Score: 6–3, 6–2

Details
- Draw: 16
- Seeds: 4

Events
Singles	Doubles
← 1982 ·	Paris Open	· 1987 →

Peter Fleming and John McEnroe won in the final 6–3, 6–2 against Mansour Bahrami and Diego Pérez.

== Seeds ==
Champion seeds are indicated in bold text while text in italics indicates the round in which those seeds were eliminated.

1. (West Germany) Boris Becker / (Socialist Federal Republic of Yugoslavia) Slobodan Živojinović (first round)
2. (France) Guy Forget / (France) Yannick Noah (semifinals)
3. (United States) **Peter Fleming** / (United States) **John McEnroe (champions)**
4. (Spain) Sergio Casal / (Spain) Emilio Sánchez (first round)

== Draw ==
=== Key ===
- Q = Qualifier
- WC = Wild card
- LL = Lucky loser
- Alt = Alternate
- SE = Special exempt
- PR = Protected ranking
- ITF = ITF entry
- JE = Junior exempt
- w/o = Walkover
- r = Retired
- d = Defaulted
- SR = Special ranking

First round
1	(West Germany) B Becker (Socialist Federal Republic of Yugoslavia) S Živojinović	**7**	4	4
(South Africa) **C Steyn** (South Africa) **D Visser**	6	**6**	**6**
(United States) M Robertson (United States) T Warneke	2	4
(Paraguay) **F González** (United States) **S Stewart**	**6**	**6**
3	(United States) **P Fleming** (United States) **J McEnroe**	6	**6**	**6**
(Italy) P Canè (United Kingdom) C Dowdeswell	**7**	2	2
(Brazil) **R Acioly** (Poland) **W Fibak**	**6**	6	**6**
(Sweden) J Gunnarsson (United States) T Wilkison	4	**7**	2
(Czechoslovakia) M Mečíř (Czechoslovakia) T Šmíd	4	2
(Switzerland) **J Hlasek** (Czechoslovakia) **P Složil**	**6**	**6**
(Iran) **M Bahrami** (Uruguay) **D Pérez**	**6**	**7**
4	(Spain) S Casal (Spain) E Sánchez	4	6
(United States) **K Curren** (United States) **B Testerman**	**6**	**6**
(South Africa) G Muller (United States) T Nelson	4	4
WC	(France) T Benhabiles (France) T Champion	3	4
2	(France) **G Forget** (France) **Y Noah**	**6**	**6**

Quarterfinals
(South Africa) C Steyn (South Africa) D Visser	6	6
(Paraguay) **F González** (United States) **S Stewart**	**7**	**7**
3	(United States) **P Fleming** (United States) **J McEnroe**	**6**	**6**
(Brazil) R Acioly (Poland) W Fibak	1	4
(Switzerland) J Hlasek (Czechoslovakia) P Složil	5	6
(Iran) **M Bahrami** (Uruguay) **D Pérez**	**7**	**7**
(United States) K Curren (United States) B Testerman	3	**7**	3
2	(France) **G Forget** (France) **Y Noah**	**6**	6	**6**

Semifinals
(Paraguay) F González (United States) S Stewart	6	2
3	(United States) **P Fleming** (United States) **J McEnroe**	**7**	**6**
(Iran) **M Bahrami** (Uruguay) **D Pérez**	**7**	**6**
2	(France) G Forget (France) Y Noah	6	3

Final
3	(United States) **Peter Fleming** (United States) **John McEnroe**	**6**	**6**
(Iran) Mansour Bahrami (Uruguay) Diego Pérez	3	2
