= 1986 Paris Open =

- Date: 27 October – 3 November
- Edition: 14th
- Draw: 32S / 16D
- Prize money: $500,000
- Surface: Carpet / indoor
- Location: Paris, France
- Venue: Palais omnisports de Paris-Bercy

Champions

Singles
- (West Germany) Boris Becker

Doubles
- (United States) Peter Fleming / (United States) John McEnroe
← 1982 ·	Paris Masters	· 1987 →

The 1986 Paris Open was a Grand Prix men's tennis tournament played on indoor carpet courts. It was the 14th edition of the Paris Open (later known as the Paris Masters). It took place at the Palais omnisports de Paris-Bercy in Paris, France, from 27 October through 3 November 1986. Boris Becker won the singles title.

== Finals ==
=== Singles ===
(West Germany) Boris Becker defeated (Spain) Sergio Casal 6–4, 6–3, 7–6

- It was Becker's 8th title of the year and the 12th of his career.

=== Doubles ===
(United States) Peter Fleming / (United States) John McEnroe defeated (Iran) Mansour Bahrami / (Uruguay) Diego Pérez 6–3, 6–2

- It was Fleming's 4th title of the year and the 61st of his career. It was McEnroe's 6th title of the year and the 131st of his career.
