= ATP Barcelona (1973–1976) =

Tennis tournament

ATP Barcelona Barcelone Championships

Defunct tennis tournament
- Tour: ATP Spring Circuit
- Founded: 1973; 53 years ago
- Abolished: 1976; 50 years ago
- Location: Barcelona, Spain
- Surface: Clay

The ATP Barcelona was a men's clay court tennis tournament founded in 1973. Also known as the Barcelone Championships that was played in Barcelona, Spain. In 1975 this event was co-valid as the Catalonian Championships (1935–1978). The tournament was part of the ATP Spring Circuit from 1973 to 1976, a subsidiary circuit of the ILTF European Circuit. It was not part of the ILTF Grand Prix Circuit.

== Past finals ==
Note: Listed as the Barcelona-1 (1973), Barcelona-2 (1975-76) events at the ATP archive results included.

=== Singles ===
Year	Winners	Runners-up	Score
1973	(Romania) Ilie Nastase	(Italy) Adriano Panatta	6–1, 3–6, 6–1, 6–2
1975	(Romania) Ilie Nastase (2)	(Spain) Juan Gisbert	6–1, 7–5, 6–2
1976	(Italy) Paolo Bertolucci	(Japan) Jun Kuki	6–1, 3–6, 6–1, 7–6

=== Doubles ===
Note:No edition in 1975.

Year	Winners	Runners-up	Score
1973	(Spain) Juan Gisbert (Spain) Manuel Orantes	(United States) Mike Estep (Romania) Ion Tiriac	6–4, 7–6
1976	(Poland) Wojtek Fibak (Poland) Jacek Niedźwiedzki	(United Kingdom) Colin Dowdeswell (Australia) Paul Kronk	6–2, 6–3

== Sources ==
- ATP Tour- Barcelona-1 Overview: https://www.atptour.com/en/tournaments/barcelona/278/overview.
