= 1982 Open de Coubertin =

1982 Paris Open
- Date: October 25 – November 1
- Edition: 13th
- Category: Grand Prix
- Draw: 32S / 16D
- Prize money: $75,000
- Surface: Carpet / indoor
- Location: Paris, France
- Venue: Palais omnisports de Paris-Bercy

Champions

Singles
- (Poland) Wojciech Fibak

Doubles
- (United States) Brian Gottfried / (United States) Bruce Manson
← 1981 ·	Paris Open	· 1986 →

The 1982 Open de Coubertin was a Grand Prix men's tennis tournament played on indoor carpet courts. It was the 13th edition of the Paris Open (later known as the Paris Masters). It took place at the Palais omnisports de Paris-Bercy in Paris, France, from 25 October through 1 November 1982. Third-seeded Wojciech Fibak won the singles title.

== Finals ==
=== Singles ===
(Poland) Wojciech Fibak defeated (United States) Bill Scanlon 6–2, 6–2, 6–2

- It was Fibak's 5th title of the year and the 56th of his career.

=== Doubles ===
(United States) Brian Gottfried / (United States) Bruce Manson defeated (United States) Jay Lapidus / (United States) Richard Meyer 6–4, 6–2

- It was Gottfried's 6th title of the year and the 75th of his career. It was Manson's 2nd title of the year and the 9th of his career.
