= Jun Kuki =

Japanese tennis player (born 1945)

- Country (sports): Japan
- Born: 28 December 1945 (age 80) Yokkaichi, Japan
- Plays: Right-handed

Singles
- Career record: 67-115
- Career titles: 0
- Highest ranking: No. 74 (7 November 1976)

Grand Slam singles results
- Australian Open: 2R (1972)
- French Open: 3R (1971)
- Wimbledon: 2R (1973)
- US Open: 2R (1971)

Doubles
- Career record: 14-69
- Career titles: 0

Grand Slam doubles results
- Australian Open: 2R (1972)
- French Open: 2R (1970, 1971)
- Wimbledon: 2R (1975)
- US Open: 1R (1970, 1971, 1972)

Jun Kuki (九鬼 潤, Kuki Jun; born 28 December 1945) is a former professional tennis player from Japan.

== Biography ==
Kuki played collegiate tennis in the United States for UCLA. He had an unbeaten season in 1969 with a 13-0 record.

He was first picked for the Japan Davis Cup team in the 1971 tournament.

His best performance in a Grand Slam tournament came at the 1971 French Open when he had wins over Phil Dent and Petre Mărmureanu, and then he lost a five-set match to Bob Lutz.

In doubles at the 1972 US Open, he and American Steve Turner were defeated in the first round by Roy Emerson and Rod Laver.

In April 1976, he had the most prolific period of his career when he finished runner-up in two Grand Prix tournaments, both in Spain. He lost to Paolo Bertolucci in the final at Barcelona, then to Buster Mottram in Palma, Majorca.

A regular Davis Cup competitor for Japan in the 1970s, Kuki played the last of his nine ties for the Japanese team in 1978. He played a total of 17 singles matches, of which he won 11.

In the 1980s, he was the coach of Etsuko Inoue, a player on the women's circuit.

== Grand Prix career finals ==
=== Singles: 2 (0-2) ===
| Result | W-L | Date | Tournament | Surface | Opponent | Score |
|---|---|---|---|---|---|---|
| Loss | 0-1 | Apr 1976 | Barcelona, Spain | Clay | (Italy) Paolo Bertolucci | 1–6, 6–3, 1–6, 6–7 |
| Loss | 0-2 | Apr 1976 | Palma, Majorca, Spain | Clay | (United Kingdom) Buster Mottram | 5–7, 3–6, 3–6 |

== See also ==
- List of Japan Davis Cup team representatives
