= 1986 Paris Open – Singles =

Singles
- 1986 Paris Open

Final
- Champion: (West Germany) Boris Becker
- Runner-up: (Spain) Sergio Casal
- Score: 6–4, 6–3, 7–6

Details
- Draw: 32
- Seeds: 8

Events
Singles	Doubles
← 1982 ·	Paris Open	· 1987 →

Boris Becker won in the final 6–4, 6–3, 7–6 against Sergio Casal.

== Seeds ==
A champion seed is indicated in bold text while text in italics indicates the round in which that seed was eliminated.

1. (West Germany) **Boris Becker (champion)**
2. (France) Yannick Noah (quarterfinals)
3. (France) Henri Leconte (semifinals)
4. (Czechoslovakia) Miloslav Mečíř (first round)
5. (United States) John McEnroe (quarterfinals)
6. (Sweden) Mikael Pernfors (quarterfinals)
7. n/a
8. (United States) Tim Mayotte (semifinals)

== Draw ==
=== Key ===
- Q = Qualifier
- WC = Wild card
- LL = Lucky loser
- Alt = Alternate
- SE = Special exempt
- PR = Protected ranking
- ITF = ITF entry
- JE = Junior exempt
- w/o = Walkover
- r = Retired
- d = Defaulted
- SR = Special ranking
- NB: The Final was the best of 5 sets while all other rounds were the best of 3 sets.

=== Final ===
Final
1	(West Germany) **Boris Becker**	**6**	**6**	**7**
Q	(Spain) Sergio Casal	4	3	6

=== Section 1 ===
First round
1	(West Germany) **B Becker**	**7**	**6**
Q	(Ecuador) H Núñez	5	4
(United States) **K Curren**	**7**	**6**
(Czechoslovakia) T Šmíd	6	3
(Sweden) **J Svensson**	**6**	**6**
(Czechoslovakia) M Šrejber	4	2
(France) **G Forget**	**6**	**6**
LL	(United States) D Rostagno	3	2
3	(France) **H Leconte**	**6**	4	**6**
WC	(France) T Champion	4	**6**	4
(Italy) **P Canè**	**7**	3	**6**
(Mexico) F Maciel	6	**6**	0
(South Africa) C Steyn	**7**	6	0
(Australia) **P McNamee**	5	**7**	**6**
(Switzerland) J Hlasek	3	6
6	(Sweden) **M Pernfors**	**6**	**7**

Second round
1	(West Germany) **B Becker**	**6**	**6**
(United States) K Curren	2	4
(Sweden) **J Svensson**	**6**	**6**
(France) G Forget	2	1
3	(France) **H Leconte**	**7**	**6**
(Italy) P Canè	5	4
(Australia) P McNamee	3	6
6	(Sweden) **M Pernfors**	**6**	**7**

Quarterfinals
1	(West Germany) **B Becker**	**6**	**6**
(Sweden) J Svensson	4	4
3	(France) **H Leconte**	**6**	**6**
6	(Sweden) M Pernfors	4	4

Semifinals
1	(West Germany) **B Becker**	**6**	3	**6**
3	(France) H Leconte	2	**6**	3

=== Section 2 ===
First round
WC/5	(United States) **J McEnroe**	**7**	**6**
Q	(United States) T Nelson	5	4
Q	(Haiti) **R Agénor**	**6**	**6**
(West Germany) E Jelen	3	0
(United States) M Anger	2	1
Q	(Spain) **S Casal**	**6**	**6**
WC	(France) **T Benhabiles**	2	**7**	**6**
4	(Czechoslovakia) M Mečíř	**6**	5	1
8	(United States) **T Mayotte**	**6**	6	**10**
(Socialist Federal Republic of Yugoslavia) S Živojinović	3	**7**	8
(Spain) **E Sánchez**	**7**	5	**6**
(Belgium) L Pimek	6	**7**	4
(United States) T Wilkison	1	**7**	4
(Czechoslovakia) **K Nováček**	**6**	5	**6**
SE	(Sweden) J Gunnarsson	4	**6**	3
2	(France) **Y Noah**	**6**	3	**6**

Second round
WC/5	(United States) **J McEnroe**	**7**	**6**
Q	(Haiti) R Agénor	6	3
Q	(Spain) **S Casal**	6	**6**	**6**
WC	(France) T Benhabiles	**7**	4	1
8	(United States) **T Mayotte**	**6**	**6**
(Spain) E Sánchez	1	1
(Czechoslovakia) K Nováček	**6**	4	3
2	(France) **Y Noah**	4	**6**	**6**

Quarterfinals
WC/5	(United States) J McEnroe	3	6
Q	(Spain) **S Casal**	**6**	**7**
8	(United States) **T Mayotte**	**7**	**7**
2	(France) Y Noah	5	5

Semifinals
Q	(Spain) **S Casal**	**6**	3	**6**
8	(United States) T Mayotte	1	**6**	3
