= 1993 Australian Open – Men's singles =

Men's singles
- 1993 Australian Open

Final
- Champion: (United States) Jim Courier
- Runner-up: (Sweden) Stefan Edberg
- Score: 6–2, 6–1, 2–6, 7–5

Details
- Draw: 128
- Seeds: 16

Events
Singles	men	women		boys	girls
Doubles	men	women	mixed	boys	girls
WC Singles	men	women	quad
WC Doubles	men	women	quad
Legends	men	women	mixed
- Australian Open

Defending champion Jim Courier defeated Stefan Edberg in a rematch of the previous year's final, 6–2, 6–1, 2–6, 7–5 to win the men's singles tennis title at the 1993 Australian Open. It was his second Australian Open title and fourth and last major singles title overall. This was also Edberg's third runner-up finish at the Australian Open in the last 4 years.

== Seeds ==
1. (United States) Jim Courier (champion)
2. (Sweden) Stefan Edberg (final)
3. (United States) Pete Sampras (semifinals)
4. (Germany) Boris Becker (first round)
5. (Croatia) ~~Goran Ivanišević~~ (withdrew because of a left foot stress fracture)
6. (United States) Michael Chang (second round)
7. (Czech Republic) Petr Korda (quarterfinals)
8. (United States) Ivan Lendl (first round)
9. (Netherlands) Richard Krajicek (second round)
10. (South Africa) Wayne Ferreira (fourth round)
11. (France) Guy Forget (quarterfinals)
12. (Spain) Carlos Costa (third round)
13. (United States) MaliVai Washington (fourth round)
14. (Germany) Michael Stich (semifinals)
15. (Spain) Sergi Bruguera (fourth round)
16. (Russia) Alexander Volkov (third round)

Andre Agassi (No. 9), because of bronchitis, withdrew from the tournament prior to the seedings.

== Draw ==
Key

- Q = Qualifier
- WC = Wild card
- LL = Lucky loser
- Alt = Alternate
- ITF = ITF entry
- PR = Protected ranking
- SR = Special ranking
- SE = Special exempt
- JE = Junior exempt
- JR = Junior Accelerator Programme entrant
- CO = College Accelerator Programme entrant
- NG = Next Gen Accelerator Program entrant
- w/o = Walkover
- r = Retired
- d = Defaulted

=== Finals ===
Quarterfinals
1	(United States) Jim Courier	6	6	6
7	(Czech Republic) Petr Korda	1	0	4
14	(Germany) Michael Stich	6	6	6
11	(France) Guy Forget	4	4	4
(New Zealand) Brett Steven	3	2	3
3	(United States) Pete Sampras	6	6	6
(Sweden) Christian Bergström	4	4	1
2	(Sweden) Stefan Edberg	6	6	6

Semifinals
1	(United States) Jim Courier	7^{7}	6	6
14	(Germany) Michael Stich	6^{4}	4	2
3	(United States) Pete Sampras	6^{5}	3	6^{3}
2	(Sweden) Stefan Edberg	7^{7}	6	7^{7}

Final
1	(United States) Jim Courier	6	6	2	7
2	(Sweden) Stefan Edberg	2	1	6	5

=== Top half ===
==== Section 1 ====
First round
1	(United States) J Courier	7	6	6
(Sweden) L Jönsson	5	0	3
(United States) R Reneberg	6	6^{5}	2	6	2
(United States) R Weiss	3	7^{7}	6	2	6
(France) R Gilbert	6	7^{7}	6
Q	(South Africa) G Stafford	1	6^{3}	2
(Austria) G Schaller	1	4	2
(France) G Raoux	6	6	6
WC	(Australia) P Rafter	6	6	3	4	2
(Netherlands) J Siemerink	4	2	6	6	6
Q	(Australia) B Dyke	3	5	7	2
(Russia) A Chesnokov	6	7	5	6
(Russia) A Cherkasov	3	6^{4}	6	6	3
(United States) J Grabb	6	7^{7}	0	4	6
(Sweden) T Enqvist	3	7^{8}	6	1	2
15	(Spain) S Bruguera	6	6^{6}	4	6	6

Second round
1	(United States) J Courier	6	7	6
(United States) R Weiss	2	5	4
(France) R Gilbert	6	6^{7}	4	7^{9}	1
(France) G Raoux	3	7^{9}	6	6^{7}	6
(Netherlands) J Siemerink	6	6	6
(Russia) A Chesnokov	1	3	4
(United States) J Grabb	1	7^{7}	5	0
15	(Spain) S Bruguera	6	6^{5}	7	6

Third round
1	(United States) J Courier	6	6	6
(France) G Raoux	4	3	4
(Netherlands) J Siemerink	6^{5}	6	3	6	7
15	(Spain) S Bruguera	7^{7}	4	6	3	9

Fourth round
1	(United States) J Courier	6	6	7^{7}
15	(Spain) S Bruguera	1	3	6^{5}

==== Section 2 ====
First round
9	(Netherlands) R Krajicek	6	6	6
Q	(Sweden) L-A Wahlgren	1	2	1
Q	(South Africa) G Muller	5	2	6^{4}
(United States) T Witsken	7	6	7^{7}
WC	(Australia) J Fitzgerald	6	6	5	4	6
(Uruguay) D Pérez	3	4	7	6	1
(Portugal) J Cunha e Silva	5	1	3
Q	(United States) C Garner	7	6	6
(Italy) O Camporese	5	6	6	6^{3}	2
(Germany) L Koslowski	7	2	3	7^{7}	6
(Ukraine) A Medvedev	6^{5}	6	7	6
(Australia) W Masur	7^{7}	1	5	4
(Italy) D Nargiso	3	2	6^{6}
(Netherlands) J Eltingh	6	6	7^{8}
(United States) C Adams	3	6	3	3
7	(Czech Republic) P Korda	6	3	6	6

Second round
9	(Netherlands) R Krajicek	4	6	1	4
(United States) T Witsken	6	1	6	6
WC	(Australia) J Fitzgerald	2	5	3
Q	(United States) C Garner	6	7	6
(Germany) L Koslowski	0	1	0
(Ukraine) A Medvedev	6	6	6
(Netherlands) J Eltingh	6^{0}	2	3
7	(Czech Republic) P Korda	7^{7}	6	6

Third round
(United States) T Witsken	1	1	6	6	4
Q	(United States) C Garner	6	6	4	4	6
(Ukraine) A Medvedev	4	6	3	6^{5}
7	(Czech Republic) P Korda	6	4	6	7^{7}

Fourth round
Q	(United States) C Garner	5	3	1
7	(Czech Republic) P Korda	7	6	6

==== Section 3 ====
First round
4	(Germany) B Becker	6	5	6	3	2
Q	(Sweden) A Järryd	3	7	3	6	6
LL	(Italy) C Caratti	2	6	7	5	1
(Australia) T Woodbridge	6	4	5	7	6
(Spain) MA Górriz	6	2	2	1
(Denmark) K Carlsen	4	6	6	6
(Uruguay) M Filippini	6	6	1
(Switzerland) C Mezzadri	3	3	0^{r}
(Argentina) A Mancini	7^{9}	6	6
(Austria) H Skoff	6^{7}	3	2
(Netherlands) M Schapers	4	3	4
WC	(Australia) J Stoltenberg	6	6	6
WC	(Australia) A McLean	1	1	2
(France) F Santoro	6	6	6
(United States) A O'Brien	4	5	2
14	(Germany) M Stich	6	7	6

Second round
Q	(Sweden) A Järryd	1	1	0^{r}
(Australia) T Woodbridge	6	6	2
(Denmark) K Carlsen	7	6	6
(Uruguay) M Filippini	5	4	4
(Argentina) A Mancini	6	6	1	2	4
WC	(Australia) J Stoltenberg	0	4	6	6	6
(France) F Santoro	7^{7}	2	2	6	4
14	(Germany) M Stich	6^{3}	6	6	4	6

Third round
(Australia) T Woodbridge	5	7	4	4
(Denmark) K Carlsen	7	5	6	6
WC	(Australia) J Stoltenberg	7	4	6^{0}	6	1
14	(Germany) M Stich	5	6	7^{7}	4	6

Fourth round
(Denmark) K Carlsen	7^{7}	4	4	0
14	(Germany) M Stich	6^{3}	6	6	6

==== Section 4 ====
First round
11	(France) G Forget	7	6	6
(Haiti) R Agénor	5	4	2
(Australia) M Woodforde	6	6	6
Q	(Germany) J Renzenbrink	4	3	3
(Czech Republic) M Damm	6	7^{8}	6
(Germany) K Braasch	2	6^{6}	3
(Australia) J Morgan	6	6	6
(Australia) S Youl	1	3	1
Q	(United States) K Jones	6	6	6
(Germany) C Saceanu	3	2	3
(Italy) G Pozzi	2	6	3	5
(Brazil) L Mattar	6	2	6	7
(Australia) S Stolle	6^{5}	3	6	2
(United States) D Wheaton	7^{7}	6	2	6
Q	(United Kingdom) C Bailey	3	1	1
6	(United States) M Chang	6	6	6

Second round
11	(France) G Forget	6	6	6
(Australia) M Woodforde	3	2	3
(Czech Republic) M Damm	5	6	3	1
(Australia) J Morgan	7	4	6	6
Q	(United States) K Jones	6	6	4	2	6
(Brazil) L Mattar	4	1	6	6	3
(United States) D Wheaton	6	6	1	6
6	(United States) M Chang	4	3	6	3

Third round
11	(France) G Forget	6	6	6
(Australia) J Morgan	3	2	2
Q	(United States) K Jones	0	6	6	6
(United States) D Wheaton	6	3	4	2

Fourth round
11	(France) G Forget	6	7^{7}	7^{8}
Q	(United States) K Jones	3	6^{5}	6^{6}

=== Bottom half ===
==== Section 5 ====
First round
(Austria) T Muster	4	6	7^{7}	6
(Netherlands) P Haarhuis	6	3	6^{4}	1
(New Zealand) B Steven	4	6	6	6
Q	(United States) D Randall	6	1	3	4
(United Kingdom) J Bates	6	3	2	4
WC	(Australia) H Denman	0	6	6	6
(Russia) A Olhovskiy	6	6	6^{4}	7^{7}
(Spain) J Sánchez	3	4	7^{7}	6^{1}
(Germany) M Zoecke	6^{3}	7^{7}	6^{3}	7^{11}	3
(Australia) R Fromberg	7^{7}	6^{5}	7^{7}	6^{9}	6
(Venezuela) N Pereira	6^{5}	6	0	2
Q	(United States) M Keil	7^{7}	1	6	6
WC	(Australia) G Doyle	0	3	1
(Sweden) N Kulti	6	6	6
(Spain) F Roig	4	3	5
12	(Spain) C Costa	6	6	7

Second round
(Austria) T Muster	2	6^{6}	4
(New Zealand) B Steven	6	7^{8}	6
WC	(Australia) H Denman	4	2	4
(Russia) A Olhovskiy	6	6	6
(Australia) R Fromberg	6	3	6	7^{8}
Q	(United States) M Keil	1	6	3	6^{6}
(Sweden) N Kulti	3	7^{7}	4	3
12	(Spain) C Costa	6	6^{4}	6	6

Third round
(New Zealand) B Steven	6	7	3	6
(Russia) A Olhovskiy	3	5	6	3
(Australia) R Fromberg	6	7^{7}	2	6
12	(Spain) C Costa	2	6^{3}	6	3

Fourth round
(New Zealand) B Steven	7^{7}	6^{3}	6^{5}	6	8
(Australia) R Fromberg	6^{3}	7^{7}	7^{7}	1	6

==== Section 6 ====
First round
13	(United States) M Washington	7	6	6
(United States) F Montana	5	2	3
(Czech Republic) D Vacek	6	6	3	4	6
(Germany) M Naewie	3	4	6	6	3
(Spain) T Carbonell	6	6	6
(Spain) E Sánchez	2	4	4
(United States) J Stark	6	6	6
(France) O Delaître	3	4	0
(Sweden) M Gustafsson	3	6^{4}	6	2
(Canada) C Pridham	6	7^{7}	4	6
LL	(United States) T Ho	3	1	1
(Austria) A Antonitsch	6	6	6
(South Africa) M Ondruska	2	5	4
(Sweden) M Larsson	6	7	6
(Germany) C-U Steeb	1	2	1
3	(United States) P Sampras	6	6	6

Second round
13	(United States) M Washington	6	7	6
(Czech Republic) D Vacek	2	5	1
(Spain) T Carbonell	4	4	3
(United States) J Stark	6	6	6
(Canada) C Pridham	3	2	7^{10}	2
(Austria) A Antonitsch	6	6	6^{8}	6
(Sweden) M Larsson	3	6	3	4
3	(United States) P Sampras	6	3	6	6

Third round
13	(United States) M Washington	6	6^{5}	6	6
(United States) J Stark	4	7^{7}	2	4
(Austria) A Antonitsch	6^{5}	4	2
3	(United States) P Sampras	7^{7}	6	6

Fourth round
13	(United States) M Washington	3	4	4
3	(United States) P Sampras	6	6	6

==== Section 7 ====
First round
8	(United States) I Lendl	4	4	6	4
(Sweden) C Bergström	6	6	2	6
(Sweden) H Holm	3	6	6	6
Q	(United States) B Garnett	6	3	2	4
(Belgium) B Wuyts	1	4	1
WC	(Australia) N Borwick	6	6	6
Q	(United States) D DiLucia	5	2	6	7	3
(France) S Simian	7	6	4	5	6
(Germany) M-K Goellner	6^{4}	4	6	6	6
(Mexico) L Herrera	7^{7}	6	4	1	4
(United States) B Shelton	4	6	2	5
Q	(Zimbabwe) B Black	6	4	6	7
Q	(Sweden) J Apell	1	6	4	6^{4}
(Germany) B Karbacher	6	3	6	7^{7}
(United States) T Martin	4	4	2
10	(South Africa) W Ferreira	6	6	6

Second round
(Sweden) C Bergström	7	2	6	1	6
(Sweden) H Holm	5	6	4	6	4
WC	(Australia) N Borwick	4	6^{4}	1
(France) S Simian	6	7^{7}	6
(Germany) M-K Goellner	1	4	4
Q	(Zimbabwe) B Black	6	6	6
(Germany) B Karbacher	3	6	2	5
10	(South Africa) W Ferreira	6	4	6	7

Third round
(Sweden) C Bergström	6	6	6
(France) S Simian	0	4	4
Q	(Zimbabwe) B Black	2	6	1	6^{8}
10	(South Africa) W Ferreira	6	3	6	7^{10}

Fourth round
(Sweden) C Bergström	6	7	2	6
10	(South Africa) W Ferreira	4	5	6	4

==== Section 8 ====
First round
16	(Russia) A Volkov	7	6	6
(Argentina) G Markus	5	4	1
(France) C Pioline	4	7^{9}	6	6
(Germany) P Kühnen	6	6^{7}	3	2
(United States) P McEnroe	4	4	1
(France) A Boetsch	6	6	6
Q	(South Africa) M Kaplan	3	1	3
(Sweden) J Svensson	6	6	6
(United States) J Tarango	6	6	6^{3}	3	2
(Israel) A Mansdorf	4	3	7^{7}	6	6
(France) T Champion	6	6	1	7
WC	(Australia) A Naumann	4	3	6	5
(Peru) J Yzaga	3	7^{9}	5	7	1
(Germany) D Prinosil	6	6^{7}	7	5	6
(Mexico) L Lavalle	4	4	4
2	(Sweden) S Edberg	6	6	6

Second round
16	(Russia) A Volkov	2	6^{5}	6	7	8
(France) C Pioline	6	7^{7}	2	5	6
(France) A Boetsch	5	2	6	7^{7}	10
(Sweden) J Svensson	7	6	3	6^{5}	8
(Israel) A Mansdorf	7^{7}	6	7
(France) T Champion	6^{3}	1	5
(Germany) D Prinosil	2	0	1
2	(Sweden) S Edberg	6	6	6

Third round
16	(Russia) A Volkov	4	4	2
(France) A Boetsch	6	6	6
(Israel) A Mansdorf	3	1	6	6^{5}
2	(Sweden) S Edberg	6	6	1	7^{7}

Fourth round
(France) A Boetsch	2	3	2
2	(Sweden) S Edberg	6	6	6

Preceded by 1992 US Open – Men's singles	Grand Slam men's singles	Succeeded by 1993 French Open – Men's singles
