= Danie Visser =

South African tennis player

- Country (sports): (South Africa)
- Residence: Palm Desert, California, United States
- Born: 26 July 1961 (age 63); Rustenburg, South Africa
- Height: 1.80 m (5 ft 11 in)
- Turned pro: 1982
- Plays: Left-handed
- Prize money: $1,526,314

Singles
- Career record: 91–129
- Career titles: 0; 0 Challenger, 0 Futures
- Highest ranking: No. 59 (24 September 1984)

Grand Slam singles results
- Australian Open: 3R (1988, 1989)
- French Open: 2R (1982, 1983, 1985)
- Wimbledon: 4R (1985)
- US Open: 3R (1983)

Doubles
- Career record: 377–293
- Career titles: 17; 2 Challenger, 0 Futures
- Highest ranking: No. 1 (29 January 1990)

Grand Slam doubles results
- Australian Open: W (1990, 1993)
- French Open: QF (1990, 1991)
- Wimbledon: F (1990)
- US Open: W (1990)

Other doubles tournaments
- Tour Finals: RR (1990)

Grand Slam mixed doubles results
- Australian Open: 2R (1993)
- French Open: F (1990, 1993)
- Wimbledon: SF (1987)
- US Open: QF (1991)

Danie Visser (born 26 July 1961) is a former professional tennis player from South Africa. A doubles specialist, he won three Grand Slam men's doubles titles (two Australian Open and one US Open). Visser reached the world No. 1 doubles ranking in January 1990.

== Tennis career ==
Visser won the first of 17 career doubles titles in 1985 at Bristol. In 1990 he won the men's doubles titles at both the Australian Open and the US Open, partnering his fellow South African player Pieter Aldrich. The pair were also doubles runners-up at Wimbledon that year. Visser won the Australian Open doubles crown again in 1993, partnering Laurie Warder. Visser won the final doubles title of his career in 1994 at Manchester.

Visser's best singles ranking was world No. 59, which he attained in 1984.

He attended Afrikaanse Hoër Seunskool (Afrikaans High School for Boys, also known as Affies), a popular and renowned public school located in Pretoria.

== Grand Slam finals ==
=== Doubles (3 wins, 1 loss) ===
Result	Year	Championship	Surface	Partner	Opponents	Score
Win	1990	Australian Open	Hard	(South Africa) Pieter Aldrich	(Canada) Grant Connell (Canada) Glenn Michibata	6–4, 4–6, 6–1, 6–4
Loss	1990	Wimbledon	Grass	(South Africa) Pieter Aldrich	(United States) Rick Leach (United States) Jim Pugh	6–7^{(5–7)}, 6–7^{(4–7)}, 6–7^{(5–7)}
Win	1990	US Open	Hard	(South Africa) Pieter Aldrich	(United States) Paul Annacone (United States) David Wheaton	6–2, 7–6^{(7–3)}, 6–2
Win	1993	Australian Open (2)	Hard	(Australia) Laurie Warder	(Australia) John Fitzgerald (Sweden) Anders Järryd	6–4, 6–3, 6–4

== ATP career finals ==
=== Doubles: 42 (17 titles, 25 runner-ups) ===
Legend Grand Slam Tournaments (3–1) ATP World Tour Finals (0–0) ATP Masters 1000 Series (1–5) ATP 500 Series (1–0) ATP 250 Series (12–19)	Finals by surface Hard (6–10) Clay (4–6) Grass (3–3) Carpet (4–6)	Finals by setting Outdoors (14–19) Indoors (3–6)

Result	W–L	Date	Tournament	Tier	Surface	Partner	Opponents	Score
Loss	0–1	May 1982	Munich, Germany	Grand Prix	Clay	(South Africa) Tian Viljoen	(United States) Chip Hooper (United States) Mel Purcell	4–6, 6–7
Loss	0–2	Feb 1983	La Quinta, United States	Grand Prix	Hard	(South Africa) Tian Viljoen	(United States) Brian Gottfried (Mexico) Raúl Ramírez	3–6, 3–6
Loss	0–3	Sep 1983	Palermo, Italy	Grand Prix	Clay	(South Africa) Tian Viljoen	(Peru) Pablo Arraya (Argentina) José Luis Clerc	6–1, 4–6, 4–6
Win	1–3	Jun 1985	Bristol, United Kingdom	Grand Prix	Grass	(South Africa) Eddie Edwards	(Australia) John Alexander (New Zealand) Russell Simpson	6–4, 7–6
Loss	1–4	Jul 1985	Livingston, United States	Grand Prix	Hard	(South Africa) Eddie Edwards	(United States) Mike De Palmer (Australia) Peter Doohan	3–6, 4–6
Loss	1–5	Feb 1986	Toronto, Canada	Grand Prix	Carpet	(South Africa) Christo Steyn	(Poland) Wojtek Fibak (Sweden) Joakim Nyström	3–6, 6–7
Loss	1–6	Apr 1986	Atlanta, United States	Grand Prix	Carpet	(South Africa) Christo Steyn	(United States) Andy Kohlberg (United States) Robert Van't Hof	2–6, 3–6
Win	2–6	Jun 1986	Bristol, United Kingdom	Grand Prix	Grass	(South Africa) Christo Steyn	(Australia) Mark Edmondson (Australia) Wally Masur	6–7, 7–6, [12–10]
Loss	2–7	Aug 1986	Cincinnati, United States	Grand Prix	Hard	(South Africa) Christo Steyn	(Australia) Mark Kratzmann (Australia) Kim Warwick	3–6, 4–6
Loss	2–8	Oct 1986	Tel Aviv, Israel	Grand Prix	Hard	(South Africa) Christo Steyn	(United States) John Letts (Sweden) Peter Lundgren	3–6, 6–3, 3–6
Loss	2–9	Feb 1987	Philadelphia, United States	Grand Prix	Carpet	(South Africa) Christo Steyn	(Spain) Sergio Casal (Spain) Emilio Sánchez	6–3, 1–6, 6–7
Loss	2–10	Feb 1988	Philadelphia, United States	Grand Prix	Carpet	(United States) Kevin Curren	(New Zealand) Kelly Evernden (United States) Johan Kriek	6–7, 3–6
Win	3–10	May 1988	Charleston, United States	Grand Prix	Clay	(South Africa) Pieter Aldrich	(Mexico) Jorge Lozano (United States) Todd Witsken	7–6, 6–3
Loss	3–11	May 1988	Forest Hills, United States	Grand Prix	Clay	(South Africa) Pieter Aldrich	(Mexico) Jorge Lozano (United States) Todd Witsken	3–6, 6–7
Loss	3–12	Jun 1988	Queen's, United Kingdom	Grand Prix	Grass	(South Africa) Pieter Aldrich	(United States) Ken Flach (United States) Robert Seguso	2–6, 6–7
Loss	3–13	Aug 1988	Stratton Mountain, United States	Grand Prix	Hard	(South Africa) Pieter Aldrich	(Mexico) Jorge Lozano (United States) Todd Witsken	3–6, 6–7
Loss	3–14	Jan 1989	Sydney, Australia	Grand Prix	Hard	(South Africa) Pieter Aldrich	(Australia) Darren Cahill (Australia) Wally Masur	4–6, 3–6
Loss	3–15	Aug 1989	Stratton Mountain, United States	Grand Prix	Hard	(South Africa) Pieter Aldrich	(Australia) Mark Kratzmann (Australia) Wally Masur	3–6, 6–4, 6–7
Win	4–15	Aug 1989	Indianapolis, United States	Grand Prix	Hard	(South Africa) Pieter Aldrich	(Australia) Peter Doohan (Australia) Laurie Warder	7–6, 7–6
Loss	4–16	Aug 1989	Cincinnati, United States	Grand Prix	Hard	(South Africa) Pieter Aldrich	(United States) Ken Flach (United States) Robert Seguso	4–6, 4–6
Win	5–16	Oct 1989	San Francisco, United States	Grand Prix	Carpet	(South Africa) Pieter Aldrich	(United States) Paul Annacone (South Africa) Christo van Rensburg	6–4, 6–3
Win	6–16	Nov 1989	Frankfurt, Germany	Grand Prix	Carpet	(South Africa) Pieter Aldrich	(Australia) Kevin Curren (Germany) Eric Jelen	7–6, 6–7, 6–3
Loss	6–17	Jan 1990	Sydney, Australia	World Series	Hard	(South Africa) Pieter Aldrich	(Australia) Pat Cash (Australia) Mark Kratzmann	4–6, 5–7
Win	7–17	Jan 1990	Melbourne, Australia	Grand Slam	Hard	(South Africa) Pieter Aldrich	(Canada) Grant Connell (Canada) Glenn Michibata	6–4, 4–6, 6–1, 6–4
Loss	7–18	Jul 1990	Wimbledon, United Kingdom	Grand Slam	Grass	(South Africa) Pieter Aldrich	(United States) Rick Leach (United States) Jim Pugh	6–7, 6–7, 6–7
Win	8–18	Jul 1990	Stuttgart, Germany	Championship Series	Clay	(South Africa) Pieter Aldrich	(Sweden) Per Henricsson (Sweden) Nicklas Utgren	6–3, 6–4
Win	9–18	Sep 1990	Flushing Meadows, United States	Grand Slam	Hard	(South Africa) Pieter Aldrich	(United States) Paul Annacone (United States) David Wheaton	6–2, 7–6, 6–2
Win	10–18	Oct 1990	Berlin, Germany	World Series	Carpet	(South Africa) Pieter Aldrich	(United States) Kevin Curren (United States) Patrick Galbraith	7–6, 7–6
Loss	10–19	May 1991	Munich, Germany	World Series	Clay	(Sweden) Anders Järryd	(United States) Patrick Galbraith (United States) Todd Witsken	5–7, 4–6
Loss	10–20	May 1991	Hamburg, Germany	Masters Series	Clay	(Brazil) Cássio Motta	(Spain) Sergio Casal (Spain) Emilio Sánchez	6–4, 3–6, 2–6
Win	11–20	Jul 1991	Gstaad, Switzerland	World Series	Clay	(South Africa) Gary Muller	(France) Guy Forget (Switzerland) Jakob Hlasek	7–6, 6–4
Loss	11–21	Feb 1992	San Francisco, United States	World Series	Hard	(South Africa) Pieter Aldrich	(United States) Jim Grabb (United States) Richey Reneberg	4–6, 5–7
Win	12–21	Apr 1992	Johannesburg, South Africa	World Series	Hard	(South Africa) Pieter Aldrich	(South Africa) Wayne Ferreira (South Africa) Piet Norval	6–4, 6–4
Loss	12–22	Apr 1992	Nice, France	World Series	Clay	(South Africa) Pieter Aldrich	(United States) Patrick Galbraith (United States) Scott Melville	1–6, 6–3, 4–6
Win	13–22	Jul 1992	Toronto, Canada	Masters Series	Hard	(United States) Patrick Galbraith	(United States) Andre Agassi (United States) John McEnroe	6–4, 6–4
Loss	13–23	Nov 1992	Paris, France	Masters Series	Carpet	(United States) Patrick Galbraith	(United States) John McEnroe (United States) Patrick McEnroe	4–6, 2–6
Win	14–23	Jan 1993	Melbourne, Australia	Grand Slam	Hard	(Australia) Laurie Warder	(Australia) John Fitzgerald (Sweden) Anders Järryd	6–4, 6–3, 6–4
Win	15–23	May 1993	Bologna, Italy	World Series	Clay	(Australia) Laurie Warder	(United States) Luke Jensen (United States) Murphy Jensen	4–6, 6–4, 6–4
Win	16–23	Oct 1993	Lyon, France	World Series	Carpet	(South Africa) Gary Muller	(South Africa) John-Laffnie de Jager (South Africa) Stefan Kruger	6–3, 7–6
Loss	16–24	Nov 1993	Stockholm, Sweden	Masters Series	Carpet	(South Africa) Gary Muller	(Australia) Todd Woodbridge (Australia) Mark Woodforde	1–6, 6–3, 2–6
Win	17–24	Jun 1994	Manchester, United Kingdom	World Series	Grass	(United States) Rick Leach	(United States) Scott Davis (United States) Trevor Kronemann	6–4, 4–6, 7–6
Loss	17–25	Jun 1995	Nottingham, United Kingdom	World Series	Grass	(United States) Patrick Galbraith	(United States) Luke Jensen (United States) Murphy Jensen	3–6, 7–5, 4–6

== ATP Challenger and ITF Futures finals ==
=== Doubles: 3 (2–1) ===
Legend ATP Challenger (2–1) ITF Futures (0–0)	Finals by surface Hard (1–1) Clay (0–0) Grass (1–0) Carpet (0–0)

Result	W–L	Date	Tournament	Tier	Surface	Partner	Opponents	Score
Win	1–0	Jul 1989	Johannesburg, South Africa	Challenger	Grass	(South Africa) Pieter Aldrich	(South Africa) David Adams (South Africa) Dean Botha	7–6, 6–4
Loss	1–1	Dec 1991	Johannesburg, South Africa	Challenger	Hard	(South Africa) Stefan Kruger	(United States) Kevin Curren (South Africa) Royce Deppe	5–7, 2–6
Win	2–1	Mar 1992	Indian Wells, United States	Challenger	Hard	(South Africa) Pieter Aldrich	(United States) Mike Briggs (United States) Trevor Kronemann	7–6, 2–6, 7–5

== Performance timelines ==
Key
W	F	SF	QF	#R	RR	Q#	DNQ	A	NH

(W) winner; (F) finalist; (SF) semifinalist; (QF) quarterfinalist; (#R) rounds 4, 3, 2, 1; (RR) round-robin stage; (Q#) qualification round; (DNQ) did not qualify; (A) absent; (NH) not held; (SR) strike rate (events won / competed); (W–L) win–loss record.

=== Singles ===
Tournament	1981	1982	1983	1984	1985	1986	1987	1988	1989	1990	1991	1992	SR	W–L	Win %
Grand Slam tournaments
Australian Open	A	A	A	A	2R	A	2R	3R	3R	A	Q1	Q2	0 / 4	6–4	60%
French Open	A	2R	2R	1R	2R	1R	A	A	A	A	A	A	0 / 5	3–5	38%
Wimbledon	Q1	1R	1R	3R	4R	2R	2R	Q1	1R	2R	Q1	A	0 / 8	8–8	50%
US Open	A	1R	3R	2R	2R	2R	1R	A	2R	A	A	A	0 / 7	6–7	46%
Win–loss	0–0	1–3	3–3	3–3	6–4	2–3	2–3	2–1	3–3	1–1	0–0	0–0	0 / 24	23–24	49%
ATP Masters Series
Indian Wells	A	A	A	A	A	A	2R	1R	2R	1R	A	A	0 / 4	2–4	33%
Miami	A	A	A	A	1R	3R	3R	1R	1R	A	A	A	0 / 5	4–5	44%
Canada	A	2R	A	A	2R	2R	A	A	A	A	A	Q3	0 / 3	3–3	50%
Cincinnati	A	2R	A	1R	2R	A	A	A	2R	A	2R	A	0 / 5	4–5	44%
Paris	A	1R	A	A	A	A	A	A	A	A	A	A	0 / 1	0–1	0%
Win–loss	0–0	2–3	0–0	0–1	2–3	3–2	3–2	0–2	2–3	0–1	1–1	0–0	0 / 18	13–18	42%

=== Doubles ===
Tournament	1981	1982	1983	1984	1985	1986	1987	1988	1989	1990	1991	1992	1993	1994	1995	1996	1997	SR	W–L	Win %
Grand Slam tournaments
Australian Open	A	A	A	A	2R	A	3R	1R	3R	W	1R	3R	W	1R	2R	A	A	2 / 10	18–8	69%
French Open	1R	3R	2R	1R	2R	1R	A	1R	A	QF	QF	2R	1R	1R	2R	A	A	0 / 13	12–13	48%
Wimbledon	1R	3R	2R	2R	1R	3R	1R	QF	QF	F	2R	1R	3R	2R	1R	A	A	0 / 15	21–15	58%
US Open	A	3R	1R	1R	1R	3R	1R	1R	2R	W	1R	3R	1R	2R	1R	A	A	1 / 14	14–13	52%
Win–loss	0–2	6–3	2–3	1–3	1–4	4–3	1–3	3–4	6–3	20–2	4–4	5–4	8–4	2–4	2–4	0–0	0–0	3 / 53	65–50	57%
Year-end Championships
ATP Finals	Did not qualify									RR	Did not qualify							0 / 1	1–2	33%
ATP Masters Series
Indian Wells	A	A	A	A	A	A	2R	A	SF	2R	1R	1R	1R	2R	1R	Q2	Q1	0 / 8	5–8	38%
Miami	A	A	A	A	1R	1R	3R	2R	SF	2R	QF	2R	2R	QF	1R	A	A	0 / 11	12–11	52%
Monte Carlo	A	A	A	A	A	A	A	A	A	A	2R	2R	A	QF	A	A	A	0 / 3	3–3	50%
Hamburg	A	A	1R	A	A	A	A	A	SF	A	F	2R	A	1R	A	A	A	0 / 5	7–5	58%
Rome	A	A	A	1R	A	A	A	A	1R	A	1R	A	2R	1R	1R	A	A	0 / 6	1–6	14%
Canada	A	1R	SF	A	QF	2R	A	A	A	A	A	W	2R	A	A	A	A	1 / 6	11–5	69%
Cincinnati	A	1R	1R	2R	A	F	A	1R	F	QF	2R	QF	1R	1R	A	A	A	0 / 11	13–11	54%
Paris	A	SF	A	A	A	QF	A	QF	SF	2R	1R	F	1R	1R	A	A	A	0 / 9	10–9	53%
Win–loss	0–0	2–3	3–3	1–3	2–2	6–4	3–2	2–3	15–6	1–4	7–7	14–6	1–6	5–7	0–3	0–0	0–0	1 / 59	62–58	59%

=== Mixed Doubles ===
Tournament	1981	1982	1983	1984	1985	1986	1987	1988	1989	1990	1991	1992	1993	1994	1995	SR	W–L	Win %
Grand Slam tournaments
Australian Open	A	A	A	A	A	A	A	A	A	A	A	1R	2R	1R	A	0 / 3	1–3	25%
French Open	A	A	A	A	A	A	A	A	A	F	3R	2R	F	1R	2R	0 / 6	11–6	65%
Wimbledon	1R	2R	A	A	A	A	SF	3R	3R	QF	2R	2R	A	2R	2R	0 / 10	16–10	62%
US Open	A	1R	1R	A	A	A	A	2R	2R	1R	QF	1R	2R	1R	A	0 / 9	5–9	36%
Win–loss	0–1	1–2	0–1	0–0	0–0	0–0	4–1	3–2	3–2	8–3	4–3	1–4	6–3	1–4	2–2	0 / 28	33–28	54%
