= 1993 Australian Open – Women's singles =

Women's singles
- 1993 Australian Open

Final
- Champion: (Federal Republic of Yugoslavia) Monica Seles
- Runner-up: (Germany) Steffi Graf
- Score: 4–6, 6–3, 6–2

Details
- Draw: 128
- Seeds: 16

Events
Singles	men	women		boys	girls
Doubles	men	women	mixed	boys	girls
WC Singles	men	women	quad
WC Doubles	men	women	quad
Legends	men	women	mixed
- Australian Open

Two-time defending champion Monica Seles defeated Steffi Graf in the final, 4–6, 6–3, 6–2 to win the women's singles tennis title at the 1993 Australian Open. It was Seles' third Australian Open title in as many appearances at the event, and eighth major title overall.

== Seeds ==
The seeded players are listed below. Monica Seles is the champion; others show the round in which they were eliminated.

1. (Federal Republic of Yugoslavia) Monica Seles (champion)
2. (Germany) Steffi Graf (finalist)
3. (Argentina) Gabriela Sabatini (semifinals)
4. (Spain) Arantxa Sánchez Vicario (semifinals)
5. (United States) Mary Joe Fernández (quarterfinals)
6. (Spain) Conchita Martínez (fourth round)
7. (United States) Jennifer Capriati (quarterfinals)
8. (Czech Republic) Jana Novotná (second round)
9. (Switzerland) Manuela Maleeva (fourth round)
10. (France) Mary Pierce (quarterfinals)
11. (Germany) Anke Huber (fourth round)
12. (United States) Lori McNeil (second round)
13. (France) Nathalie Tauziat (fourth round)
14. (Bulgaria) Katerina Maleeva (fourth round)
15. (Bulgaria) Magdalena Maleeva (fourth round)
16. (United States) Zina Garrison (third round)

== Draw ==
=== Key ===
- Q = Qualifier
- WC = Wild card
- LL = Lucky loser
- r = Retired

=== Finals ===
Quarterfinals
1	(Federal Republic of Yugoslavia) Monica Seles	6	6^{5}	6
(France) Julie Halard	2	7^{7}	0
3	(Argentina) Gabriela Sabatini	4	7^{14}	6
10	(France) Mary Pierce	6	6^{12}	0
5	(United States) Mary Joe Fernández	5	4
4	(Spain) Arantxa Sánchez Vicario	7	6
7	(United States) Jennifer Capriati	5	2
2	(Germany) Steffi Graf	7	6

Semifinals
1	(Federal Republic of Yugoslavia) Monica Seles	6	6
3	(Argentina) Gabriela Sabatini	1	2
4	(Spain) Arantxa Sánchez Vicario	5	4
2	(Germany) Steffi Graf	7	6

Finals
1	(Federal Republic of Yugoslavia) Monica Seles	4	6	6
2	(Germany) Steffi Graf	6	3	2

=== Earlier rounds ===
==== Section 1 ====
First round
1	(Federal Republic of Yugoslavia) M Seles	6	6
(Italy) G Pizzichini	1	2
Q	(Sweden) M Strandlund	4	7	6
(Switzerland) E Zardo	6	5	3
(United States) A Grossman	6	6
(Italy) L Golarsa	3	4
(United States) P Fendick	6	6
Q	(United States) J Emmons	1	3
(Finland) N Dahlman	6	7^{7}
(Japan) R Hiraki	2	6^{3}
(United States) S Stafford	6	6
(Latvia) L Neiland	4	1
(Germany) W Probst	6	6
WC	(Australia) J Taylor	0	3
(Georgia (country)) L Meskhi	7	4	4
13	(France) N Tauziat	5	6	6

Second round
1	(Federal Republic of Yugoslavia) M Seles	6	6
Q	(Sweden) M Strandlund	2	0
(United States) A Grossman	1	6^{6}
(United States) P Fendick	6	7^{8}
(Finland) N Dahlman	6	6
(United States) S Stafford	1	2
(Germany) W Probst	2	6	2
13	(France) N Tauziat	6	4	6

Third round
1	(Federal Republic of Yugoslavia) M Seles	6	6
(United States) P Fendick	1	0
(Finland) N Dahlman	2	1
13	(France) N Tauziat	6	6

Fourth round
1	(Federal Republic of Yugoslavia) M Seles	6	6
13	(France) N Tauziat	2	0

==== Section 2 ====
First round
16	(United States) Z Garrison	6	4	6
(South Africa) A Coetzer	4	6	3
(United States) D Faber	7^{7}	7^{7}
(United States) C Kuhlman	6^{3}	6^{3}
(Germany) K Kschwendt	2	6	6
(Croatia) N Ercegović	6	1	4
(France) J Halard	6	6
LL	(Japan) M Kidowaki	0	0
(Netherlands) M Oremans	6	6
(United States) A Frazier	4	1
(South Africa) E Reinach	2	6	6
WC	(Australia) K-A Guse	6	2	2
(United Kingdom) M Javer	6	6
(United States) C Cunningham	3	1
(Netherlands) S Rottier	6	4	1
6	(Spain) C Martínez	2	6	6

Second round
16	(United States) Z Garrison	4	6	6
(United States) D Faber	6	4	2
(Germany) K Kschwendt	4	6	4
(France) J Halard	6	1	6
(Netherlands) M Oremans	6	6
(South Africa) E Reinach	1	1
(United Kingdom) M Javer	5	1
6	(Spain) C Martínez	7	6

Third round
16	(United States) Z Garrison	4	5
(France) J Halard	6	7
(Netherlands) M Oremans	3	6	4
6	(Spain) C Martínez	6	4	6

Fourth round
(France) J Halard	6	6
6	(Spain) C Martínez	4	3

==== Section 3 ====
First round
3	(Argentina) G Sabatini	6	7
(United States) C Rubin	1	5
(Italy) N Baudone	6	1	6
(China) F Li	3	6	3
(United States) K Po	7	7
(South Africa) J Kruger	5	5
(Canada) P Hy	6	6
(Belgium) S Appelmans	3	4
(France) I Demongeot	6	7
(Italy) F Bonsignori	1	5
(Japan) M Endo	3	6	6
(Austria) J Wiesner	6	4	4
(Australia) N Provis	6	6
(Hungary) A Földényi	2	3
WC	(Australia) M Jaggard-Lai	2	3
12	(United States) L McNeil	6	6

Second round
3	(Argentina) G Sabatini	6	6
(Italy) N Baudone	0	1
(United States) K Po	6	6
(Canada) P Hy	4	2
(France) I Demongeot	2	6	6
(Japan) M Endo	6	2	2
(Australia) N Provis	3	6	6
12	(United States) L McNeil	6	1	1

Third round
3	(Argentina) G Sabatini	6	6
(United States) K Po	1	3
(France) I Demongeot	1	2
(Australia) N Provis	6	6

Fourth round
3	(Argentina) G Sabatini	7	6
(Australia) N Provis	5	3

==== Section 4 ====
First round
10	(France) M Pierce	6	6
(Australia) J Byrne	2	2
(Japan) K Date	6	6
(Ukraine) E Brioukhovets	3	2
Q	(United States) L Davenport	7	6
(France) A Fusai	5	1
(Netherlands) M Kiene	6	4	7
(Germany) M Zivec-Skulj	1	6	5
(United States) N Arendt	6	6
(Argentina) P Tarabini	0	1
(United States) G Fernández	6	6
(South Africa) R Fairbank-Nideffer	2	3
(United States) R White	6	6
WC	(Australia) K Godridge	2	2
(France) S Testud	2	4
8	(Czech Republic) J Novotná	6	6

Second round
10	(France) M Pierce	6	6
(Japan) K Date	1	1
Q	(United States) L Davenport	7	6
(Netherlands) M Kiene	5	4
(United States) N Arendt	4	6^{7}
(United States) G Fernández	6	7^{9}
(United States) R White	4	7	6
8	(Czech Republic) J Novotná	6	5	2

Third round
10	(France) M Pierce	6	6
Q	(United States) L Davenport	3	0
(United States) G Fernández	7^{8}	3	7
(United States) R White	6^{6}	6	5

Fourth round
10	(France) M Pierce	6	6
(United States) G Fernández	0	0

==== Section 5 ====
First round
5	(United States) M J Fernández	6	6
(United States) B Bowes	3	1
(Chinese Taipei) S-t Wang	6	6
Q	(United States) P O'Reilly	1	2
(Finland) P Thorén	6	7^{7}
(Japan) Y Kamio	3	6^{3}
(Japan) N Sawamatsu	7	7
(Russia) E Maniokova	5	5
(Germany) S Meier	6	6
(Japan) N Miyagi	1	2
(United States) G Helgeson	6	6
Q	(United States) C Benjamin	3	1
(Belgium) S Wasserman	7	7
(Canada) R Simpson-Alter	5	5
Q	(Mexico) A Gavaldón	6	4	2
9	(Switzerland) Man Maleeva	3	6	6

Second round
5	(United States) M J Fernández	7^{7}	6
(Chinese Taipei) S-t Wang	6^{1}	4
(Finland) P Thorén	1	5
(Japan) N Sawamatsu	6	7
(Germany) S Meier	3	3
(United States) G Helgeson	6	6
(Belgium) S Wasserman	4	1
9	(Switzerland) Man Maleeva	6	6

Third round
5	(United States) M J Fernández	2	6	6
(Japan) N Sawamatsu	6	3	1
(United States) G Helgeson	2	6	4
9	(Switzerland) Man Maleeva	6	3	6

Fourth round
5	(United States) M J Fernández	7	2	6
9	(Switzerland) Man Maleeva	5	6	2

==== Section 6 ====
First round
11	(Germany) A Huber	6	6
WC	(Australia) N Pratt	3	1
(Germany) V Martinek	6	6
(United States) K Rinaldi	4	2
(Hungary) A Temesvári-Trunkos	6	4	6
(Netherlands) M Bollegraf	1	6	3
(Argentina) I Gorrochategui	3	7^{7}	6
(Australia) R Stubbs	6	6^{4}	2
(Slovakia) R Zrubáková	6	6
(United States) T Whitlinger	4	3
(United States) S Rehe	6	6
(Switzerland) C Fauche	2	3
(Peru) L Gildemeister	6	6
(Austria) S Dopfer	3	1
(France) N van Lottum	2	3
4	(Spain) A Sánchez Vicario	6	6

Second round
11	(Germany) A Huber	6	6
(Germany) V Martinek	2	4
(Hungary) A Temesvári-Trunkos	1	5
(Argentina) I Gorrochategui	6	7
(Slovakia) R Zrubáková	5	6	8
(United States) S Rehe	7	3	6
(Peru) L Gildemeister	0	1
4	(Spain) A Sánchez Vicario	6	6

Third round
11	(Germany) A Huber	6	7
(Argentina) I Gorrochategui	2	5
(Slovakia) R Zrubáková	1	3
4	(Spain) A Sánchez Vicario	6	6

Fourth round
11	(Germany) A Huber	5	2
4	(Spain) A Sánchez Vicario	7	6

==== Section 7 ====
First round
7	(United States) J Capriati	6	6
(United States) L Harvey-Wild	0	1
(Argentina) F Labat	6	6
(Czech Republic) A Strnadová	3	1
(Germany) S Hack	6	2	7
(Poland) K Nowak	4	6	5
(Belarus) N Zvereva	6	6
(Indonesia) N Basuki	3	3
(Germany) N Rittner	7	6
Q	(United Kingdom) C Wood	5	3
(Slovakia) K Habšudová	6	6
WC	(Australia) L Field	2	2
(Belgium) D Monami	6	6
(Argentina) B Fulco-Villella	2	0
(Australia) R McQuillan	6	5	2
14	(Bulgaria) K Maleeva	4	7	6

Second round
7	(United States) J Capriati	6^{8}	7	6
(Argentina) F Labat	7^{10}	5	2
(Germany) S Hack	5	7^{7}	3
(Belarus) N Zvereva	7	6^{3}	6
(Germany) B Rittner	6	7^{7}
(Slovakia) K Habšudová	2	6^{5}
(Belgium) D Monami	1	4
14	(Bulgaria) K Maleeva	6	6

Third round
7	(United States) J Capriati	7	7
(Belarus) N Zvereva	5	5
(Germany) B Rittner	1	1
14	(Bulgaria) K Maleeva	6	6

Fourth round
7	(United States) J Capriati	6^{2}	6	6
14	(Bulgaria) K Maleeva	7^{7}	3	1

==== Section 8 ====
First round
15	(Bulgaria) Mag Maleeva	6	6
(Netherlands) N Krijger-Jagerman	2	0
(Czech Republic) P Langrová	6	6
(Spain) N Pérez Peñate	0	1
(Germany) M Babel	6	6
WC	(Australia) E Smylie	2	3
(South Africa) T Price	6	7
(Japan) K Nagatsuka	3	5
(United States) D Graham	6	1	6
(United States) P Shriver	4	6	3
(Germany) C Porwik	6	6
(Italy) F Perfetti	1	3
(United States) J Santrock	6	6
WC	(Australia) J Limmer	2	4
Q	(France) N Herreman	2	1
2	(Germany) S Graf	6	6

Second round
15	(Bulgaria) Mag Maleeva	6	6
(Czech Republic) P Langrová	1	0
(Germany) M Babel	7	1	6
(South Africa) T Price	5	6	3
(United States) D Graham	3	5
(Germany) C Porwik	6	7
(United States) J Santrock	1	1
2	(Germany) S Graf	6	6

Third round
15	(Bulgaria) Mag Maleeva	6	6
(Germany) M Babel	3	2
(Germany) C Porwik	1	r
2	(Germany) S Graf	6

Fourth round
15	(Bulgaria) Mag Maleeva	3	3
2	(Germany) S Graf	6	6
