= 1993 Australian Open – Men's doubles =

Tennis tournament

Men's doubles
- 1993 Australian Open

Final
- Champion: (South Africa) Danie Visser (Australia) Laurie Warder
- Runner-up: (Australia) John Fitzgerald (Sweden) Anders Järryd
- Score: 6–4, 6–3, 6–4

Details
- Draw: 64
- Seeds: 16

Events
Singles	men	women		boys	girls
Doubles	men	women	mixed	boys	girls
WC Singles	men	women	quad
WC Doubles	men	women	quad
Legends	men	women	mixed
- Australian Open

The men's doubles tournament at the 1993 Australian Open was held from 16 through 29 January 1993 on the outdoor hard courts at the Flinders Park in Melbourne, Australia. Danie Visser and Laurie Warder won the title, defeating John Fitzgerald and Anders Järryd in the final.

== Seeds ==
1. (Australia) Todd Woodbridge / (Australia) Mark Woodforde (first round)
2. (United States) Jim Grabb / (United States) Richey Reneberg (quarterfinals)
3. (United States) Kelly Jones / (United States) Rick Leach (second round)
4. (Australia) John Fitzgerald / (Sweden) Anders Järryd (final)
5. (Netherlands) Tom Nijssen / (Czech Republic) Cyril Suk (second round)
6. (United States) Steve DeVries / (Australia) David Macpherson (third round)
7. (United States) Patrick McEnroe / (United States) Jonathan Stark (third round)
8. (Australia) Mark Kratzmann / (Australia) Wally Masur (semifinals)
9. (Canada) Grant Connell / (United States) Patrick Galbraith (second round)
10. (South Africa) Danie Visser / (Australia) Laurie Warder (champions)
11. (Spain) Sergio Casal / (Spain) Emilio Sánchez (second round)
12. (South Africa) David Adams / (Russia) Andrei Olhovskiy (first round)
13. (Netherlands) Jacco Eltingh / (Netherlands) Paul Haarhuis (third round)
14. (South Africa) Wayne Ferreira / (South Africa) Piet Norval (third round)
15. (Netherlands) Hendrik Jan Davids / (Belgium) Libor Pimek (second round)
16. (United States) Kent Kinnear / (United States) Sven Salumaa (third round)

== Draw ==
Key

- Q = Qualifier
- WC = Wild card
- LL = Lucky loser
- Alt = Alternate
- ITF = ITF entry
- PR = Protected ranking
- SR = Special ranking
- SE = Special exempt
- JE = Junior exempt
- JR = Junior Accelerator Programme entrant
- CO = College Accelerator Programme entrant
- NG = Next Gen Accelerator Program entrant
- w/o = Walkover
- r = Retired
- d = Defaulted

=== Finals ===
Quarterfinals
(South Africa) Gary Muller (Spain) Javier Sánchez	3	0	7	7	2
8	(Australia) Mark Kratzmann (Australia) Wally Masur	6	6	6	6	6
4	(Australia) John Fitzgerald (Sweden) Anders Järryd	7	6	6
(United States) Bret Garnett (United States) T. J. Middleton	5	3	4
(United States) Shelby Cannon (United States) Scott Melville	6	6	4	4
(South Africa) John-Laffnie de Jager (South Africa) Marcos Ondruska	4	7	6	6
10	(South Africa) Danie Visser (Australia) Laurie Warder	6	6	4	4	22
2	(United States) Jim Grabb (United States) Richey Reneberg	3	4	6	6	20

Semifinals
8	(Australia) Mark Kratzmann (Australia) Wally Masur	6	1	1
4	(Australia) John Fitzgerald (Sweden) Anders Järryd	7	6	6
(South Africa) John-Laffnie de Jager (South Africa) Marcos Ondruska	3	6	3	4
10	(South Africa) Danie Visser (Australia) Laurie Warder	6	3	6	6

Final
4	(Australia) John Fitzgerald (Sweden) Anders Järryd	4	3	4
10	(South Africa) Danie Visser (Australia) Laurie Warder	6	6	6

=== Top half ===
==== Section 1 ====
First round
1	(Australia) T Woodbridge (Australia) M Woodforde	7	6	2
(South Africa) G Muller (Spain) J Sánchez	2	7	6
(Netherlands) T Kempers (Netherlands) M Oosting	7	4	4
(Germany) P Kühnen (Italy) D Nargiso	6	6	6
(United States) L Jensen (United States) M Jensen	6	6
WC	(Australia) S Baldas (Australia) M Draper	4	3
(Australia) B Dyke (Australia) C Limberger	5	7	12
16	(United States) K Kinnear (United States) S Salumaa	7	5	14
9	(Canada) G Connell (United States) P Galbraith	6	7
WC	(Australia) G Doyle (Australia) J Eagle	3	5
(Uruguay) D Pérez (Spain) F Roig	3	2
(Sweden) S Edberg (Netherlands) J Siemerink	6	6
(Zimbabwe) B Black (United States) D Wheaton	3	5
(United States) B Pearce (South Africa) B Talbot	6	7
(Sweden) M Renström (Sweden) M Tillström	3	2
8	(Australia) M Kratzmann (Australia) W Masur	6	6

Second round
(South Africa) G Muller (Spain) J Sánchez	4	6	6
(Germany) P Kühnen (Italy) D Nargiso	6	3	2
(United States) L Jensen (United States) M Jensen	6	6	7
16	(United States) K Kinnear (United States) S Salumaa	3	7	9
9	(Canada) G Connell (United States) P Galbraith	6	7	2
(Sweden) S Edberg (Netherlands) J Siemerink	7	6	6
(United States) B Pearce (South Africa) B Talbot	4	4
8	(Australia) M Kratzmann (Australia) W Masur	6	6

Third round
(South Africa) G Muller (Spain) J Sánchez	6	6	6
16	(United States) K Kinnear (United States) S Salumaa	7	4	3
(Sweden) S Edberg (Netherlands) J Siemerink
8	(Australia) M Kratzmann (Australia) W Masur	w/o

Quarterfinals
(South Africa) G Muller (Spain) J Sánchez	3	0	7	2
8	(Australia) M Kratzmann (Australia) W Masur	6	6	6	6

==== Section 2 ====
First round
4	(Australia) J Fitzgerald (Sweden) A Järryd	6	7
(United States) M Bauer (United States) B Joelson	3	5
(United States) B Devening (Finland) O Rahnasto	4	3
(Canada) G Michibata (United States) D Pate	6	6
(Germany) MK Goellner (Germany) D Prinosil	6	6
(Australia) N Borwick (Australia) S Youl	7	7
(Australia) S Stolle (Australia) J Stoltenberg	6	4
13	(Netherlands) J Eltingh (Netherlands) P Haarhuis	7	6
12	(South Africa) D Adams (Russia) A Olhovskiy	6	6	4
(United States) B Garnett (United States) TJ Middleton	3	7	6
(Sweden) R Båthman (Sweden) R Bergh	7	6	3
(United States) M Keil (United States) D Randall	6	7	6
(Sweden) J Donar (Sweden) O Jonsson	7	3	9
(United States) T Nelson (Sweden) T Svantesson	6	6	11
(Sweden) H Holm (Norway) BO Pedersen	4	6
6	(United States) S DeVries (Australia) D Macpherson	6	7

Second round
4	(Australia) J Fitzgerald (Sweden) A Järryd	7	6
(Canada) G Michibata (United States) D Pate	6	4
(Australia) N Borwick (Australia) S Youl	4	3
13	(Netherlands) J Eltingh (Netherlands) P Haarhuis	6	6
(United States) B Garnett (United States) TJ Middleton	6	6	6
(United States) M Keil (United States) D Randall	4	7	3
(United States) T Nelson (Sweden) T Svantesson	6	1	3
6	(United States) S DeVries (Australia) D Macpherson	4	6	6

Third round
4	(Australia) J Fitzgerald (Sweden) A Järryd	7	6
13	(Netherlands) J Eltingh (Netherlands) P Haarhuis	5	4
(United States) B Garnett (United States) TJ Middleton	6	7
6	(United States) S DeVries (Australia) D Macpherson	4	6

Quarterfinals
4	(Australia) J Fitzgerald (Sweden) A Järryd	7	6	6
(United States) B Garnett (United States) TJ Middleton	5	3	4

=== Bottom half ===
==== Section 3 ====
First round
5	(Netherlands) T Nijssen (Czech Republic) C Suk	6	4	6
(United States) D Eisenman (United States) T Mercer	4	7	2
(Italy) O Camporese (Netherlands) R Krajicek	6	6
(United States) B Shelton (United States) K Thorne	2	4
(United States) S Cannon (United States) S Melville	6	6
(United States) S Davis (United States) T Witsken	2	3
(Czech Republic) M Damm (Czech Republic) V Flégl	5	5
11	(Spain) S Casal (Spain) E Sánchez	7	7
14	(South Africa) W Ferreira (South Africa) P Norval	6	6
WC	(Australia) H Denman (Australia) B Richardson	4	4
(The Bahamas) M Knowles (Kenya) P Wekesa	3	6	6
(Australia) A Kratzmann (Australia) R Rasheed	6	1	3
(United States) F Montana (United States) G Van Emburgh	4	7	5
(South Africa) JL de Jager (South Africa) M Ondruska	6	6	7
(New Zealand) K Evernden (Venezuela) N Pereira	5	4
3	(United States) K Jones (United States) R Leach	7	6

Second round
5	(Netherlands) T Nijssen (Czech Republic) C Suk	6	3
(Italy) O Camporese (Netherlands) R Krajicek	7	6
(United States) S Cannon (United States) S Melville	6	7
11	(Spain) S Casal (Spain) E Sánchez	4	6
14	(South Africa) W Ferreira (South Africa) P Norval	6	3	6
(The Bahamas) M Knowles (Kenya) P Wekesa	3	6	3
(South Africa) JL de Jager (South Africa) M Ondruska	7	6
3	(United States) K Jones (United States) R Leach	6	3

Third round
(Italy) O Camporese (Netherlands) R Krajicek	6	5	1
(United States) S Cannon (United States) S Melville	4	7	6
14	(South Africa) W Ferreira (South Africa) P Norval	2	6
(South Africa) JL de Jager (South Africa) M Ondruska	6	7

Quarterfinals
(United States) S Cannon (United States) S Melville	6	6	4	4
(South Africa) JL de Jager (South Africa) M Ondruska	4	7	6	6

==== Section 4 ====
First round
7	(United States) P McEnroe (United States) J Stark	7	4	6
(South Africa) R Deppe (New Zealand) B Steven	5	6	1
WC	(Australia) R Fromberg (Australia) J Morgan	6	7
(Portugal) J Cunha Silva (Czech Republic) T Zdražila	3	5
(United Kingdom) J Bates (Netherlands) M Schapers	6	6
(Mexico) L Lavalle (Brazil) L Mattar	4	3
WC	(Australia) W Arthurs (Australia) M Tebbutt	5	7	2
10	(South Africa) D Visser (Australia) L Warder	7	6	6
15	(Netherlands) HJ Davids (Belgium) L Pimek	7	7
(Spain) T Carbonell (Spain) C Costa	6	6
(United States) M Briggs (United States) T Kronemann	7	6
(United Kingdom) N Broad (South Africa) S Kruger	6	3
(South Africa) M Barnard (South Africa) B Haygarth	4	7	1
WC	(Australia) P Kilderry (Australia) P Rafter	6	5	6
(Czech Republic) P Korda (Czech Republic) D Vacek	4	6	1
2	(United States) J Grabb (United States) R Reneberg	6	3	6

Second round
7	(United States) P McEnroe (United States) J Stark	4	6	6
WC	(Australia) R Fromberg (Australia) J Morgan	6	3	1
(United Kingdom) J Bates (Netherlands) M Schapers	6	3	2
10	(South Africa) D Visser (Australia) L Warder	4	6	6
15	(Netherlands) HJ Davids (Belgium) L Pimek	7	3	4
(United States) M Briggs (United States) T Kronemann	5	6	6
WC	(Australia) P Kilderry (Australia) P Rafter	6	6	7
2	(United States) J Grabb (United States) R Reneberg	3	7	9

Third round
7	(United States) P McEnroe (United States) J Stark	6	6
10	(South Africa) D Visser (Australia) L Warder	7	7
(United States) M Briggs (United States) T Kronemann	4	4
2	(United States) J Grabb (United States) R Reneberg	6	6

Quarterfinals
10	(South Africa) D Visser (Australia) L Warder	6	6	4	3	22
2	(United States) J Grabb (United States) R Reneberg	3	4	6	6	20
