= 1993 Australian Open – Mixed doubles =

Mixed doubles
- 1993 Australian Open

Final
- Champions: (Spain) Arantxa Sánchez Vicario (Australia) Todd Woodbridge
- Runners-up: (United States) Zina Garrison-Jackson (United States) Rick Leach
- Score: 7–5, 6–4

Details
- Draw: 32
- Seeds: 8

Events
Singles	men	women		boys	girls
Doubles	men	women	mixed	boys	girls
WC Singles	men	women	quad
WC Doubles	men	women	quad
Legends	men	women	mixed
- Australian Open

Nicole Provis and Mark Woodforde were the defending champions but lost in the second round to Nana Miyagi and Kent Kinnear.

Arantxa Sánchez Vicario and Todd Woodbridge won in the final 7–5, 6–4 against Zina Garrison-Jackson and Rick Leach.

== Seeds ==
Champion seeds are indicated in bold text while text in italics indicates the round in which those seeds were eliminated.

1. (Spain) **Arantxa Sánchez Vicario** / (Australia) **Todd Woodbridge (champions)**
2. (Belarus) Natasha Zvereva / (United States) Kelly Jones (semifinals)
3. (United States) Zina Garrison-Jackson / (United States) Rick Leach (final)
4. (Latvia) Larisa Neiland / (Czech Republic) Cyril Suk (first round)
5. (Australia) Nicole Provis / (Australia) Mark Woodforde (second round)
6. (United States) Stephanie Rehe / (South Africa) Danie Visser (second round)
7. (South Africa) Elna Reinach / (United States) Patrick Galbraith (first round)
8. (United States) Patty Fendick / (United States) Steve DeVries (first round)

== Draw ==
Key

- Q = Qualifier
- WC = Wild card
- LL = Lucky loser
- Alt = Alternate
- ITF = ITF entry
- PR = Protected ranking
- SR = Special ranking
- SE = Special exempt
- JE = Junior exempt
- JR = Junior Accelerator Programme entrant
- CO = College Accelerator Programme entrant
- NG = Next Gen Accelerator Program entrant
- w/o = Walkover
- r = Retired
- d = Defaulted

=== Final ===
Final
1	**(Spain) Arantxa Sánchez Vicario** **(Australia) Todd Woodbridge**	**7**	**6**
3	(United States) Zina Garrison-Jackson (United States) Rick Leach	5	4

=== Top half ===
First round
1	(Spain) **A Sánchez Vicario** (Australia) **T Woodbridge**	**6**	**6**
(United States) A Frazier (Sweden) R Båthman	4	2
(France) M Pierce (Netherlands) H J Davids	**7**	2	2
(United States) **K Rinaldi** (Canada) **G Connell**	6	**6**	**6**
(Spain) **C Martínez** (Spain) **J Sánchez**	**6**	**6**
ALT	(United States) R Fairbank-Nideffer (South Africa) G Muller	4	4
(United States) **G Fernández** (United States) **T Witsken**	**6**	**6**
8	(United States) P Fendick (United States) S DeVries	4	4
4	(Latvia) L Neiland (Czech Republic) C Suk	3	**7**	5
(Canada) **J Hetherington** (Canada) **G Michibata**	**6**	5	**7**
(Italy) L Golarsa (Spain) S Casal	**6**	3	5
(Australia) **K Radford** (South Africa) **P Norval**	2	**6**	**7**
WC	(United States) **P Shriver** (Australia) **S Stolle**	**6**	**6**
(United States) K Adams (United States) L Jensen	4	3
(South Africa) A Coetzer (South Africa) S Kruger	5	3
6	(United States) **S Rehe** (South Africa) **D Visser**	**7**	**6**

Second round
1	(Spain) **A Sánchez Vicario** (Australia) **T Woodbridge**	**6**	**6**
(United States) K Rinaldi (Canada) G Connell	4	4
(Spain) **C Martínez** (Spain) **J Sánchez**	**6**	6	**6**
(United States) G Fernández (United States) T Witsken	2	**7**	3
(Canada) **J Hetherington** (Canada) **G Michibata**	**6**	**6**
(Australia) K Radford (South Africa) P Norval	2	4
WC	(United States) **P Shriver** (Australia) **S Stolle**	**6**	**6**
6	(United States) S Rehe (South Africa) D Visser	3	4

Quarterfinals
1	(Spain) **A Sánchez Vicario** (Australia) **T Woodbridge**	**6**	**6**
(Spain) C Martínez (Spain) J Sánchez	1	1
(Canada) **J Hetherington** (Canada) **G Michibata**	**7**	3	**6**
WC	(United States) P Shriver (Australia) S Stolle	6	**6**	2

Semifinals
1	(Spain) **A Sánchez Vicario** (Australia) **T Woodbridge**	**6**	**6**
(Canada) J Hetherington (Canada) G Michibata	3	3

=== Bottom half ===
First round
5	(Australia) **N Provis** (Australia) **M Woodforde**	5	**7**	**6**
(United States) R White (Netherlands) T Kempers	**7**	6	4
(Japan) **N Miyagi** (United States) **K Kinnear**	**6**	**6**
(France) I Demongeot (South Africa) B Talbot	4	4
(United States) S Collins (Australia) M Kratzmann	3	1
(Australia) **R McQuillan** (Australia) **D Macpherson**	**6**	**6**
(Australia) R Stubbs (United States) G Van Emburgh	2	4
3	(United States) **Z Garrison-Jackson** (United States) **R Leach**	**6**	**6**
7	(South Africa) E Reinach (United States) P Galbraith	5	2
(Australia) **E Smylie** (Australia) **J Fitzgerald**	**7**	**6**
(Australia) **M Jaggard-Lai** (Netherlands) **J Eltingh**	**6**	5	**13**
(New Zealand) J Richardson (Australia) L Warder	4	**7**	11
WC	(Argentina) G Sabatini (Spain) E Sánchez	3	4
(Netherlands) **M Bollegraf** (Netherlands) **T Nijssen**	**6**	**6**
(Australia) J-A Faull (United States) S Salumaa	3	4
2	(Belarus) **N Zvereva** (United States) **K Jones**	**6**	**6**

Second round
5	(Australia) N Provis (Australia) M Woodforde	**6**	4	4
(Japan) **N Miyagi** (United States) **K Kinnear**	1	**6**	**6**
(Australia) R McQuillan (Australia) D Macpherson	3	6
3	(United States) **Z Garrison-Jackson** (United States) **R Leach**	**6**	**7**
(Australia) **E Smylie** (Australia) **J Fitzgerald**	**6**	**6**
(Australia) M Jaggard-Lai (Netherlands) J Eltingh	2	3
(Netherlands) M Bollegraf (Netherlands) T Nijssen	**7**	4	1
2	(Belarus) **N Zvereva** (United States) **K Jones**	5	**6**	**6**

Quarterfinals
(Japan) N Miyagi (United States) K Kinnear	**6**	6	7
3	(United States) **Z Garrison-Jackson** (United States) **R Leach**	4	**7**	**9**
(Australia) E Smylie (Australia) J Fitzgerald	3	**6**	3
2	(Belarus) **N Zvereva** (United States) **K Jones**	**6**	3	**6**

Semifinals
3	(United States) **Z Garrison-Jackson** (United States) **R Leach**	**6**	**7**
2	(Belarus) N Zvereva (United States) K Jones	2	6
