= 1980 Paris Open =

- Date: 27 October – 2 November
- Edition: 11th
- Draw: 32S / 16D
- Prize money: $50,000
- Surface: Hard / indoor
- Location: Paris, France
- Venue: Palais omnisports de Paris-Bercy

Champions

Singles
- (United States) Brian Gottfried

Doubles
- (Italy) Paolo Bertolucci / (Italy) Adriano Panatta
← 1979 ·	Paris Open	· 1981 →

The 1980 Paris Open, also known that year as the Crocodile Open, was a Grand Prix tennis tournament played on indoor hard courts. It was the 11th edition of the Paris Open (later known as the Paris Masters). It took place at the Palais omnisports de Paris-Bercy in Paris, France, from 27 October through 2 November 1980. Brian Gottfried won the singles title.

== Finals ==
=== Singles ===
(United States) Brian Gottfried defeated (Italy) Adriano Panatta 4–6, 6–3, 6–1, 7–6

- It was Gottfried's 9th title of the year and the 67th of his career.

=== Doubles ===
(Italy) Paolo Bertolucci / (Italy) Adriano Panatta defeated (United States) Brian Gottfried / (South Africa) Raymond Moore 6–4, 6–4

- It was Bertolucci's 2nd title of the year and the 17th of his career. It was Panatta's 3rd title of the year and the 24th of his career.
