= 1982 Paris Open – Doubles =

Doubles
- 1982 Paris Open
- 1981 Champions: (Romania) Ilie Năstase (France) Yannick Noah

Final
- Champions: (United States) Brian Gottfried (United States) Bruce Manson
- Runners-up: (United States) Jay Lapidus (United States) Richard Meyer
- Score: 6–4, 6–2

Details
- Draw: 16
- Seeds: 4

Events
Singles	Doubles
- Paris Open

Ilie Năstase and Yannick Noah were the defending champions but only Nastase competed that year with Adriano Panatta.

Nastase and Panatta lost in the semifinals to Jay Lapidus and Richard Meyer.

Brian Gottfried and Bruce Manson won in the final 6–4, 6–2 against Lapidus and Meyer.

== Seeds ==
Champion seeds are indicated in bold text while text in italics indicates the round in which those seeds were eliminated.

1. (United States) **Brian Gottfried** / (United States) **Bruce Manson (champions)**
2. (United States) Tracy Delatte / (United States) Mel Purcell (quarterfinals)
3. (South Africa) Bernard Mitton / (South Africa) Danie Visser (semifinals)
4. (Romania) Ilie Năstase / (Italy) Adriano Panatta (semifinals)

== Draw ==
Key

- Q = Qualifier
- WC = Wild card
- LL = Lucky loser
- Alt = Alternate
- ITF = ITF entry
- PR = Protected ranking
- SR = Special ranking
- SE = Special exempt
- JE = Junior exempt
- JR = Junior Accelerator Programme entrant
- CO = College Accelerator Programme entrant
- NG = Next Gen Accelerator Program entrant
- w/o = Walkover
- r = Retired
- d = Defaulted

First round
1	(United States) **B Gottfried** (United States) **B Manson**	**7**	**7**
(Italy) G Ocleppo (France) C Roger-Vasselin	6	6
(Socialist Federal Republic of Yugoslavia) **Ž Franulović** (Uruguay) **D Pérez**	4	**7**	**7**
(United States) E Iskersky (United Kingdom) R Lewis	**6**	6	5
3	(South Africa) **B Mitton** (South Africa) **D Visser**	4	**6**	**6**
(France) D Naegelen (France) J Potier	**6**	3	2
(United States) **M De Palmer** (United States) **T Moor**	**7**	**6**
(United States) G Núñez (Ecuador) H Núñez	6	4
(Italy) **G Marchetti** (Italy) **E Vattuone**	**6**	3	**15**
(Uruguay) H Roverano (Belgium) J Vanlangendonck	2	**6**	13
(Poland) W Fibak (United States) B Scanlon	5	4
4	(Romania) **I Năstase** (Italy) **A Panatta**	**7**	**6**
(United States) **J Lapidus** (United States) **R Meyer**	**6**	**6**
(United States) M Doyle (United States) E Fromm	3	3
(France) J-L Haillet (France) P Portes	6	2
2	(United States) **T Delatte** (United States) **M Purcell**	**7**	**6**

Quarterfinals
1	(United States) **B Gottfried** (United States) **B Manson**	**6**	**6**
(Socialist Federal Republic of Yugoslavia) Ž Franulović (Uruguay) D Pérez	0	1
3	(South Africa) **B Mitton** (South Africa) **D Visser**	3	**6**	**8**
(United States) M De Palmer (United States) T Moor	**6**	2	6
(Italy) G Marchetti (Italy) E Vattuone	3	4
4	(Romania) **I Năstase** (Italy) **A Panatta**	**6**	**6**
(United States) **J Lapidus** (United States) **R Meyer**	**6**	3	**6**
2	(United States) T Delatte (United States) M Purcell	3	**6**	4

Semifinals
1	(United States) **B Gottfried** (United States) **B Manson**	4	**7**	**6**
3	(South Africa) B Mitton (South Africa) D Visser	**6**	6	4
4	(Romania) I Năstase (Italy) A Panatta	1	6
(United States) **J Lapidus** (United States) **R Meyer**	**6**	**7**

Final
1	(United States) **Brian Gottfried** (United States) **Bruce Manson**	**6**	**6**
(United States) Jay Lapidus (United States) Richard Meyer	4	2
