= Filip Krajcik =

- Native name: Filip Krajčík
- Country (sports): Austria
- Born: 23 July 1955; Prague, Czechoslovakia
- Died: 30 August 2001 (aged 46)

Singles
- Career record: 1–6
- Highest ranking: No. 227 (4 Jan 1981)

Grand Slam singles results
- Australian Open: Q3 (1979)

Doubles
- Career record: 1–8
- Highest ranking: No. 760 (3 Apr 1989)

Filip Krajcik (23 July 1955 – 30 August 2001) was an Austrian tennis coach and professional player.

Born in Prague, Krajcik was the son of a former Czechoslovak Davis Cup player (Ján) and moved with his family to Vienna at age 10. He won two national championships in doubles during the 1970s and reached a best singles ranking of 227 on the professional tour, with his best Grand Prix performance a round of 16 appearance at the 1980 Paris Open.

Krajcik had a stint as captain of the Austria Davis Cup team, which included the 1990 side which reached the semi-finals of the World Group. From 1996, until his death from cancer in 2001, he captained the Austria Fed Cup team.
