= Mark Vines =

American tennis player

- Country (sports): United States
- Born: February 23, 1957 (age 68); Richmond, Virginia
- Height: 1.70 m (5 ft 7 in)
- Turned pro: 1980
- Retired: 1984
- Plays: Left-handed (one-handed backhand)

Singles
- Career record: 8–24
- Career titles: 1
- Highest ranking: No. 110 (April 4, 1982)

Grand Slam singles results
- French Open: 1R (1982)
- US Open: 3R (1981)

Doubles
- Career record: 12–33
- Career titles: 0
- Highest ranking: No. 191 (January 2, 1984)

Grand Slam doubles results
- French Open: 2R (1982)
- US Open: 1R (1981, 1983)

Mark Vines (born February 23, 1957, in Richmond, Virginia, United States) is an American former tennis player. He won one singles title, the Paris Indoors tournament in 1981. Vines reached a career-high singles ranking of World No. 110 in April 1982.

== Tennis career ==
He played at Southern Methodist University and graduated in 1979. In addition to his win in Paris, Vines reached the semi-finals of the doubles in the same tournament and the third round of the 1981 US Open.

In recent years, Vines has achieved much success on the senior tour, reaching No. 3 in the M55 circuit in October 2012.

== Career finals ==
=== Singles (1 title) ===
Result	W-L	Date	Tournament	Surface	Opponent	Score
Win	1–0	Nov 1981	Paris, France	Hard (i)	(France) Pascal Portes	6–2, 6–4, 6–3
