= Paolo Bertolucci =

Italian tennis player

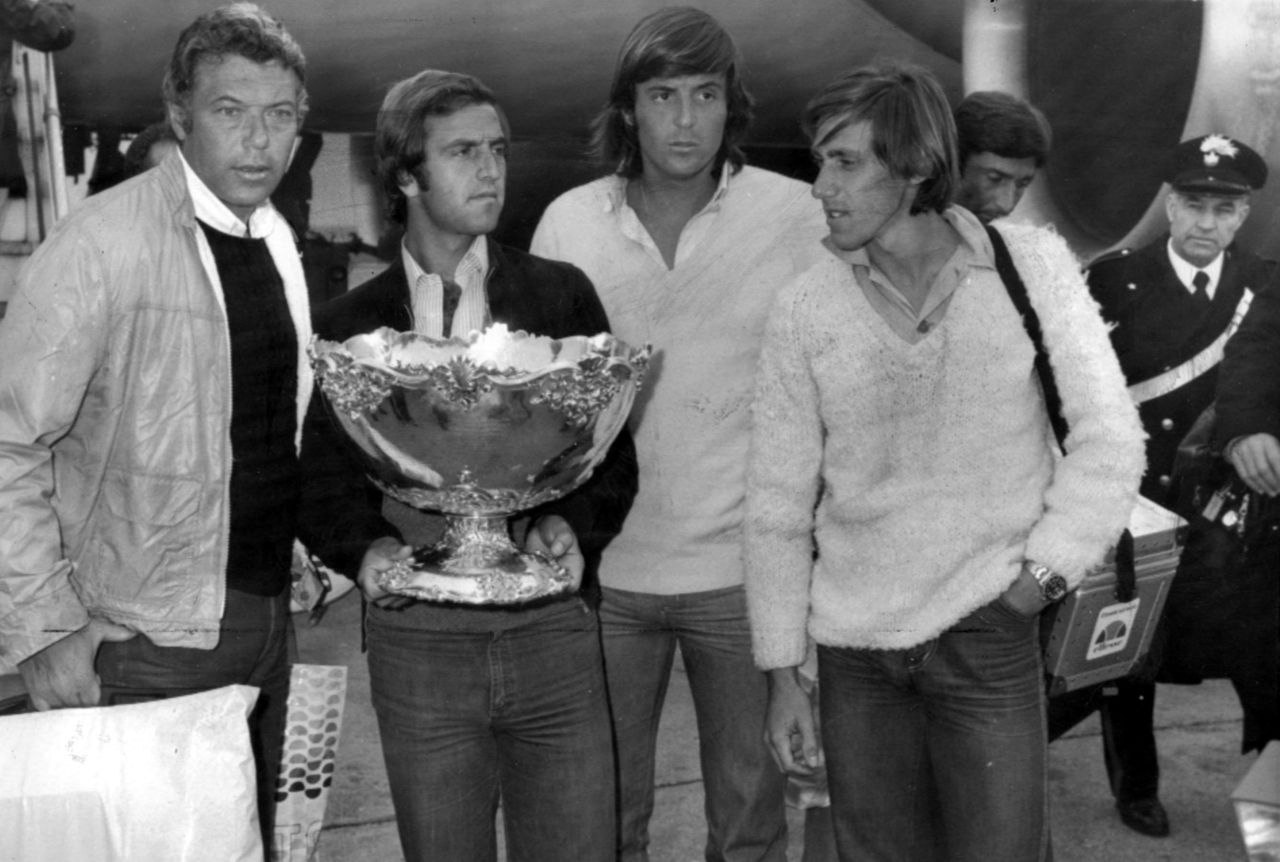
- Bertolucci, second from left, with the silver salad bowl in his hands.
- Country (sports): Italy
- Residence: Forte dei Marmi, Italy
- Born: 3 August 1951 (age 75) Forte dei Marmi
- Height: 1.75 m (5 ft 9 in)
- Retired: 1983
- Plays: Right-handed (one-handed backhand)

Singles
- Career record: 199–147
- Career titles: 6
- Highest ranking: No. 12 (23 August 1973)

Grand Slam singles results
- French Open: QF (1973)
- Wimbledon: 1R (1972)
- US Open: 1R (1973, 1976)

Doubles
- Career record: 187–120
- Career titles: 12
- Highest ranking: No. 27 (24 March 1980)

Team competitions
- Davis Cup: W (1976)

Paolo Bertolucci (Italian pronunciation: [ˈpaːolo bertoˈluttʃi]; born 3 August 1951) is a retired Italian professional tennis player. He is currently working as a sport commentator for Italian Sky TV.

Bertolucci won the Davis Cup with Italy in 1976. His greatest success on ATP Tour was the victory at the 1977 Hamburg Masters, where he beat Manuel Orantes in the final in four sets. In 1976, Bertolucci also won the Grand Prix tournaments of Florence and Barcelona. His career-high singles ranking was world No. 12, achieved in August 1973.

Bertolucci was non-playing-captain of the Italy Davis Cup team from 1985 to 2001.

He considers himself Roman Catholic.

== Career finals ==
=== Singles: 12 (6–6) ===
Result	W-L	Date	Tournament	Surface	Opponent	Score
Loss	0–1	May 1974	Florence, Italy	Clay	(Italy) Adriano Panatta	3–6, 1–6
Loss	0–2	May 1974	Bournemouth, UK	Clay	(Romania) Ilie Năstase	1–6, 3–6, 2–6
Win	1–2	May 1975	Florence, Italy	Clay	(France) Georges Goven	6–3, 6–4
Win	2–2	Apr 1976	Barcelona, Spain	Clay	(Japan) Jun Kuki	6–1, 3–6, 6–1, 7–6
Win	3–2	May 1976	Florence, Italy	Clay	(France) Patrick Proisy	6–7, 2–6, 6–3, 6–2, 10–8
Win	4–2	Apr 1977	Florence, Italy	Clay	(United Kingdom) John Feaver	6–4, 6–1, 7–5
Win	5–2	May 1977	Hamburg, Germany	Clay	(Spain) Manuel Orantes	6–3, 4–6, 6–2, 6–3
Win	6–2	Jun 1977	Berlin, Germany	Clay	(Czechoslovakia) Jiří Hřebec	6–4, 5–7, 4–6, 6–2, 6–4
Loss	6–3	Sep 1978	Bournemouth, UK	Clay	(Spain) José Higueras	2–6, 1–6, 3–6
Loss	6–4	Mar 1980	Cairo, Egypt	Clay	(Italy) Corrado Barazzutti	4–6, 0–6
Loss	6–5	Nov 1980	Bologna, Italy	Carpet (i)	(Czechoslovakia) Tomáš Šmíd	5–7, 2–6
Loss	6–6	Jun 1981	Venice, Italy	Clay	(Bolivia) Mario Martínez	4–6, 4–6

=== Doubles: 19 (12–7) ===
Result	W-L	Date	Tournament	Surface	Partner	Opponents	Score
Win	1–0	Apr 1973	Florence, Italy	Clay	(Italy) Adriano Panatta	(Spain) Juan Gisbert (Romania) Ilie Năstase	6–3, 6–4
Win	2–0	May 1974	Florence, Italy	Clay	(Italy) Adriano Panatta	(Hungary) Róbert Machán (Hungary) Balázs Taróczy	6–3, 3–6, 6–4
Loss	2–1	May 1974	Bournemouth, UK	Clay	(Italy) Corrado Barazzutti	(Spain) Juan Gisbert (Romania) Ilie Năstase	4–6, 2–6, 0–6
Win	3–1	Jul 1974	Båstad, Sweden	Clay	(Italy) Adriano Panatta	(Sweden) Ove Nils Bengtson (Sweden) Björn Borg	3–6, 6–2, 6–4
Loss	3–2	Jan 1975	Richmond, US	Carpet	(Italy) Adriano Panatta	(Austria) Hans Kary (United States) Fred McNair	6–7^{(6–8)}, 7–5, 6–7^{(6–8)}
Win	4–2	Feb 1975	Bologna, Italy	Carpet (i)	(Italy) Adriano Panatta	(United States) Arthur Ashe (Netherlands) Tom Okker	6–3, 3–6, 6–3
Loss	4–3	Feb 1975	Barcelona, Spain	Carpet (i)	(Italy) Adriano Panatta	(United States) Arthur Ashe (Netherlands) Tom Okker	5–7, 1–6
Win	5–3	Mar 1975	London, UK	Carpet (i)	(Italy) Adriano Panatta	(West Germany) Jürgen Fassbender (West Germany) Jürgen Pohmann	6–3, 6–4
Win	6–3	Jul 1975	Kitzbühel, Austria	Clay	(Italy) Adriano Panatta	(France) Patrice Dominguez (France) François Jauffret	6–2, 6–2, 7–6
Win	7–3	Nov 1975	Buenos Aires, Argentina	Clay	(Italy) Adriano Panatta	(West Germany) Jürgen Fassbender (West Germany) Jürgen Pohmann	7–6, 6–7, 6–4
Loss	7–4	Jul 1976	Gstaad, Switzerland	Clay	(Italy) Adriano Panatta	(West Germany) Jürgen Fassbender (West Germany) Jürgen Pohmann	5–7, 3–6, 3–6
Win	8–4	May 1979	Florence, Italy	Clay	(Italy) Adriano Panatta	(Czechoslovakia) Ivan Lendl (Czechoslovakia) Pavel Složil	6–4, 6–3
Win	9–4	Oct 1979	Barcelona, Spain	Clay	(Italy) Adriano Panatta	(Brazil) Carlos Kirmayr (Brazil) Cássio Motta	6–4, 6–3
Win	10–4	Mar 1980	Monte Carlo, Monaco	Clay	(Italy) Adriano Panatta	(United States) Vitas Gerulaitis (United States) John McEnroe	6–2, 5–7, 6–3
Loss	10–5	May 1980	Florence, Italy	Clay	(Italy) Adriano Panatta	(United States) Gene Mayer (Mexico) Raúl Ramírez	1–6, 4–6
Win	11–5	Oct 1980	Paris, France	Hard (i)	(Italy) Adriano Panatta	(United States) Brian Gottfried (South Africa) Raymond Moore	6–4, 6–4
Loss	11–6	Mar 1981	Cairo, Egypt	Clay	(Italy) Gianni Ocleppo	(Egypt) Ismail El Shafei (Hungary) Balázs Taróczy	7–6, 3–6, 1–6
Loss	11–7	May 1981	Florence, Italy	Clay	(Italy) Adriano Panatta	(Mexico) Raúl Ramírez (Czechoslovakia) Pavel Složil	3–6, 6–3, 3–6
Win	12–7	May 1982	Florence, Italy	Clay	(Italy) Adriano Panatta	(United States) Sammy Giammalva (United States) Tony Giammalva	7–6, 6–1

== See also ==
- Tennis in Italy
