= Pascal Portes =

French tennis player

- Country (sports): France
- Residence: Paris, France
- Born: 28 May 1959 (age 65); Villeneuve-sur-Lot, France
- Height: 1.75 m (5 ft 9 in)
- Prize money: $227,283

Singles
- Career record: 100–120
- Career titles: 0
- Highest ranking: No. 44 (2 February 1981)

Grand Slam singles results
- Australian Open: 2R (1980)
- French Open: 3R (1980)
- Wimbledon: 2R (1979, 1980, 1982)
- US Open: 4R (1980)

Doubles
- Career record: 36–68
- Career titles: 2
- Highest ranking: No. 118 (6 August 1984)

Grand Slam doubles results
- French Open: 2R (1979, 1980, 1984)
- Wimbledon: 1R (1979, 1981)

Team competitions
- Davis Cup: QF (1984)

Pascal Portes (born 28 May 1959) is a former professional tennis player from France. During his career, he won two doubles titles. He achieved a career-high singles ranking of World No. 44 in 1981 and a career-high doubles ranking of World No. 118 in 1984.

Portes was a member of the French Davis Cup team in 1979, 1980, 1981, and 1984.

== ATP finals ==
=== Singles runners-up (2) ===
| Result | W-L | Date | Tournament | Surface | Opponent | Score |
|---|---|---|---|---|---|---|
| Loss | 0–1 | Dec 1978 | Calcutta, India | Clay | (France) Yannick Noah | 3–6, 2–6 |
| Loss | 0–2 | Nov 1981 | Paris Indoor, France | Hard (i) | (United States) Mark Vines | 2–6, 4–6, 3–6 |

=== Doubles titles (2) ===
| Result | W-L | Date | Tournament | Surface | Partner | Opponents | Score |
|---|---|---|---|---|---|---|---|
| Win | 1–0 | Apr 1981 | Nice, France | Clay | (France) Yannick Noah | (New Zealand) Chris Lewis (Czechoslovakia) Pavel Složil | 4–6, 6–3, 6–4 |
| Win | 2–0 | Jul 1984 | Kitzbühel, Austria | Clay | (France) Henri Leconte | (United Kingdom) Colin Dowdeswell (Poland) Wojtek Fibak | 2–6, 7–6, 7–6 |
