= 1978 Paris Open – Doubles =

Doubles
- 1978 Paris Open
- 1977 Champions: (United States) Brian Gottfried (Mexico) Raúl Ramírez

Final
- Champions: (United States) Bruce Manson (Rhodesia) Andrew Pattison
- Runners-up: (Romania) Ion Țiriac (Argentina) Guillermo Vilas
- Score: 7–6, 6–2

Details
- Draw: 16
- Seeds: 4

Events
Singles	Doubles
← 1977 ·	Paris Open	· 1979 →

Brian Gottfried and Raúl Ramírez were the defending champions but did not compete that year.

Bruce Manson and Andrew Pattison won the doubles title at the 1978 Paris Open tennis tournament defeating Ion Țiriac and Guillermo Vilas in the final 7–6, 6–2.

== Seeds ==
Champion seeds are indicated in bold text while text in italics indicates the round in which those seeds were eliminated.

1. (United States) Robert Lutz / (United States) Stan Smith (semifinals)
2. (Romania) Ion Țiriac / (Argentina) Guillermo Vilas (final)
3. (Egypt) Ismail El Shafei / (South Africa) Raymond Moore (semifinals)
4. (France) Jean-Louis Haillet / (France) Gilles Moretton (quarterfinals)

== Draw ==
=== Key ===
- Q = Qualifier
- WC = Wild card
- LL = Lucky loser
- Alt = Alternate
- SE = Special exempt
- PR = Protected ranking
- ITF = ITF entry
- JE = Junior exempt
- w/o = Walkover
- r = Retired
- d = Defaulted
- SR = Special ranking

First round
1	(United States) **R Lutz** (United States) **S Smith**	**6**	**6**
(France) B Fritz (France) C Roger-Vasselin	4	4
(France) **P Dominguez** (France) **D Naegelen**	**6**	**6**
(France) C Freyss (France) P Portes	3	2
4	(France) **J-L Haillet** (France) **G Moretton**	**6**	**7**
(Spain) A Jimenez (Spain) J Soler	4	5
(United States) **B Manson** (Rhodesia) **A Pattison**	5	**6**	**6**
(United Kingdom) J Feaver (Australia) J James	**7**	3	2
(United Kingdom) R Drysdale (United Kingdom) R Lewis	6	2
(United States) **J Austin** (United States) **G Hardie**	**7**	**6**
(France) D Bedel (France) P Proisy	**6**	3	4
3	(Egypt) **I El Shafei** (South Africa) **R Moore**	4	**6**	**6**
(United States) **T Garcia** (United States) **J Sadri**	**7**	**7**
(Sweden) O N Bengtson (United States) T Gullikson	6	5
(France) É Deblicker (France) Y Noah	**6**	5	4
2	(Romania) **I Țiriac** (Argentina) **G Vilas**	4	**7**	**6**

Quarterfinals
1	(United States) **R Lutz** (United States) **S Smith**	**6**	**6**
(France) P Dominguez (France) D Naegelen	3	3
4	(France) J-L Haillet (France) G Moretton	3	6
(United States) **B Manson** (Rhodesia) **A Pattison**	**6**	**7**
(United States) J Austin (United States) G Hardie	2	4
3	(Egypt) **I El Shafei** (South Africa) **R Moore**	**6**	**6**
(United States) T Garcia (United States) J Sadri	0	3
2	(Romania) **I Țiriac** (Argentina) **G Vilas**	**6**	**6**

Semifinals
1	(United States) R Lutz (United States) S Smith	4	3
(United States) **B Manson** (Rhodesia) **A Pattison**	**6**	**6**
3	(Egypt) I El Shafei (South Africa) R Moore	3	3
2	(Romania) **I Țiriac** (Argentina) **G Vilas**	**6**	**6**

Final
(United States) **Bruce Manson** (Rhodesia) **Andrew Pattison**	**7**	**6**
2	(Romania) Ion Țiriac (Argentina) Guillermo Vilas	6	2
