= 1978 French Indoor Championships =

1978 Paris Open
- Date: 30 October – 5 November
- Edition: 9th
- Category: Grand Prix circuit
- Draw: 32S / 16D
- Prize money: $50,000
- Surface: Carpet / indoor
- Location: Paris, France
- Venue: Palais omnisports de Paris-Bercy

Champions

Singles
- (United States) Robert Lutz

Doubles
- (United States) Bruce Manson / (Rhodesia) Andrew Pattison
← 1977 ·	Paris Open	· 1979 →

The 1978 French Indoor Championships, also co valid as the Paris Open was a Grand Prix men's tennis tournament played on indoor carpet courts. It was the 9th edition of the Paris Open (later known as the Paris Masters). It took place at the Palais omnisports de Paris-Bercy in Paris, France from 30 October through 5 November 1978. Bob Lutz won the singles title.

== Finals ==
=== Singles ===
(United States) Bob Lutz defeated (United States) Tom Gullikson 6–2, 6–2, 7–6

- It was Lutz's 4th title of the year and the 35th of his career.

=== Doubles ===
(United States) Bruce Manson / (Rhodesia) Andrew Pattison defeated (Romania) Ion Țiriac / (Argentina) Guillermo Vilas 7–6, 6–2

- It was Manson's only title of the year and the 1st of his career. It was Pattison's only title of the year and the 6th of his career.
