= 1974 Jean Becker Open =

- Date: 28 October – 3 November
- Edition: 5th
- Category: Grand Prix (Grade B)
- Draw: 32S/16D
- Prize money: $50,000
- Surface: Carpet / indoor
- Location: Paris, France

Champions

Singles
- (United States) Brian Gottfried

Doubles
- (France) Patrice Dominguez / (France) François Jauffret
← 1973 ·	Paris Masters	· 1975 →

The 1974 Jean Becker Open, also known as the Paris Open for sponsorship reasons, was a men's Grand Prix tennis tournament played on indoor carpet courts. It was the fifth edition of the Paris Open (later known as the Paris Masters) and was held at the Palais omnisports de Paris-Bercy in Paris, France from 28 October through 3 November 1974. Brian Gottfried won the singles title.

== Finals ==
=== Singles ===
(United States) Brian Gottfried defeated (United States) Eddie Dibbs 6–3, 5–7, 8–6, 6–0

- It was Gottfried's 3rd title of the year and the 8th of his career.

=== Doubles ===
(France) Patrice Dominguez / (France) François Jauffret defeated (United States) Brian Gottfried / (Mexico) Raúl Ramírez 7–5, 6–4

- It was Dominguez's 2nd title of the year and the 4th of his career. It was Jauffret's only title of the year and the 3rd of his career.
