= 1973 Jean Becker Open – Doubles =

Doubles
- 1973 Paris Open
- 1972 Champions: (France) Pierre Barthès (France) François Jauffret

Final
- Champions: (Spain) Juan Gisbert Sr. (Romania) Ilie Năstase
- Runners-up: (United States) Arthur Ashe (United States) Roscoe Tanner
- Score: 6–2, 4–6, 7–5

Details
- Draw: 24
- Seeds: 4

Events
Singles	Doubles
← 1972 ·	Paris Open	· 1974 →

== Seeds ==
Champion seeds are indicated in bold text while text in italics indicates the round in which those seeds were eliminated. All four seeded teams received byes to the second round.

1. (United States) Tom Gorman / (United States) Stan Smith (semifinals)
2. (Netherlands) Tom Okker / (United States) Marty Riessen (semifinals)
3. (United States) Arthur Ashe / (United States) Roscoe Tanner (final)
4. (Spain) **Juan Gisbert Sr.** / (Romania) **Ilie Năstase (champions)**

== Draw ==
=== Key ===
- Q = Qualifier
- WC = Wild card
- LL = Lucky loser
- Alt = Alternate
- SE = Special exempt
- PR = Protected ranking
- ITF = ITF entry
- JE = Junior exempt
- w/o = Walkover
- r = Retired
- d = Defaulted
- SR = Special ranking

=== Final ===
Final
4	(Spain) **Juan Gisbert Sr.** (Romania) **Ilie Năstase**	**6**	4	**7**
3	(United States) Arthur Ashe (United States) Roscoe Tanner	2	**6**	5

=== Top half ===
First round
(Pakistan) **H Rahim** (Argentina) **G Vilas**	3	**6**	**6**
(France) J-C Barclay (Socialist Federal Republic of Yugoslavia) N Špear	**6**	2	3
(United Kingdom) **G Battrick** (United Kingdom) **G Stilwell**	**6**	**6**
(France) J-P Meyer (France) W N'Godrella	4	4
(France) **P Dominguez** (France) **P Proisy**	**6**	**7**
(Monaco) L Borfiga (France) P Lemoine	1	6
(Chile) **J Fillol** (Colombia) **I Molina**	**7**	**6**
(France) T Bernasconi (France) P Hagelauer	5	4

Second round
1	(United States) **T Gorman** (United States) **S Smith**	**7**	**7**
(Pakistan) H Rahim (Argentina) G Vilas	6	6
(United Kingdom) G Battrick (United Kingdom) G Stilwell	4	4
(Spain) **A Muñoz** (Spain) **M Orantes**	**6**	**6**
4	(Spain) **J Gisbert Sr.** (Romania) **I Năstase**	**6**	3	**6**
(France) P Dominguez (France) P Proisy	3	**6**	3
(Chile) J Fillol (Colombia) I Molina	2	5
(Australia) **B Carmichael** (South Africa) **F McMillan**	**6**	**7**

Quarterfinals
1	(United States) **T Gorman** (United States) **S Smith**	**6**	**6**
(Spain) A Muñoz (Spain) M Orantes	3	4
4	(Spain) **J Gisbert Sr.** (Romania) **I Năstase**	**7**	**6**
(Australia) B Carmichael (South Africa) F McMillan	5	4

Semifinals
1	(United States) T Gorman (United States) S Smith	3	6
4	(Spain) **J Gisbert Sr.** (Romania) **I Năstase**	**6**	**7**

=== Bottom half ===
First round
(United States) **J Borowiak** (Argentina) **T Vázquez**	4	**6**	**6**
(France) J-L Haillet (France) P Joly	**6**	3	4
(Sweden) **O N Bengtson** (Sweden) **B Borg**	**6**	**6**
(France) É Deblicker (France) B Montrenaud	4	4
(Sweden) **K Johansson** (Australia) **B Phillips-Moore**
(France) P Beust (France) H Gauvain

Second round
(West Germany) **K Meiler** (South Africa) **R Moore**	**6**	**7**
(United States) J Borowiak (Argentina) T Vázquez	2	5
(France) J-B Chanfreau (France) G Goven	3	4
3	(United States) **A Ashe** (United States) **R Tanner**	**6**	**6**
(Socialist Federal Republic of Yugoslavia) N Pilić (Romania) I Țiriac	5	2
(Sweden) **O N Bengtson** (Sweden) **B Borg**	**7**	**6**
(Sweden) K Johansson (Australia) B Phillips-Moore	1	2
2	(Netherlands) **T Okker** (United States) **M Riessen**	**6**	**6**

Quarterfinals
(West Germany) K Meiler (South Africa) R Moore	4	2
3	(United States) **A Ashe** (United States) **R Tanner**	**6**	**6**
(Sweden) O N Bengtson (Sweden) B Borg	3	3
2	(Netherlands) **T Okker** (United States) **M Riessen**	**6**	**6**

Semifinals
3	(United States) **A Ashe** (United States) **R Tanner**	**6**	**6**
2	(Netherlands) T Okker (United States) M Riessen	4	3
