= 1972 Jean Becker Open =

- Date: 30 October – 5 November
- Edition: 3rd
- Category: Grand Prix (B)
- Draw: 32S / 32D
- Prize money: $50,000
- Surface: Carpet
- Location: Paris, France
- Venue: Palais omnisports de Paris-Bercy

Champions

Singles
- (United States) Stan Smith

Doubles
- (France) Pierre Barthès / (France) François Jauffret
| ← 1970 · | Paris Open | · 1973 → |

The 1972 Jean Becker Open, also known as the Paris Open, was a men's tennis tournament played on indoor carpet courts. The event was part of the Grand Prix circuit and classified as a B category tournament. It was the 3rd edition of the Paris Open (later known as the Paris Masters) and took place at the Palais omnisports de Paris-Bercy in Paris, France, from 30 October through 5 November 1972. First-seeded Stan Smith won the singles title.

== Finals ==
=== Singles ===
(United States) Stan Smith defeated (Spain) Andrés Gimeno 6–2, 6–2, 7–5

- It was Smith's 10th title of the year and the 26th of his career.

=== Doubles ===
(France) Pierre Barthès / (France) François Jauffret defeated (Spain) Andrés Gimeno / (Spain) Juan Gisbert Sr. 6–3, 6–2

- It was Barthès' only title of the year and the 4th of his career. It was Jauffret's only title of the year and the 2nd of his career.
