= 1978 Paris Open – Singles =

Singles
- 1978 Paris Open

Final
- Champion: (United States) Robert Lutz
- Runner-up: (United States) Tom Gullikson
- Score: 6–2, 6–2, 7–6

Details
- Draw: 32
- Seeds: 8

Events
Singles	Doubles
← 1977 ·	Paris Open	· 1979 →

Corrado Barazzutti was the defending champion but did not compete that year.

Robert Lutz won in the final 6–2, 6–2, 7–6 against Tom Gullikson.

== Seeds ==
A champion seed is indicated in bold text while text in italics indicates the round in which that seed was eliminated.

1. (United States) Brian Gottfried (semifinals)
2. (United Kingdom) John Lloyd (first round)
3. (United States) Stan Smith (first round)
4. (United States) **Robert Lutz (champion)**
5. (West Germany) Ulrich Pinner (quarterfinals)
6. (United States) Tom Gullikson (final)
7. (Spain) Ángel Giménez (second round)
8. (United Kingdom) Mark Cox (semifinals)

== Draw ==
=== Key ===
- Q = Qualifier
- WC = Wild card
- LL = Lucky loser
- Alt = Alternate
- SE = Special exempt
- PR = Protected ranking
- ITF = ITF entry
- JE = Junior exempt
- w/o = Walkover
- r = Retired
- d = Defaulted
- SR = Special ranking
- NB: The Final was the best of 5 sets while all other rounds were the best of 3 sets.

=== Final ===
Final
4	(United States) **Robert Lutz**	**6**	**6**	**7**
6	(United States) Tom Gullikson	2	2	6

=== Section 1 ===
First round
1	(United States) **B Gottfried**	**6**	**6**
(Netherlands) L Sanders	4	1
(Egypt) I El Shafei	3	**7**	7
Q	(France) **D Bedel**	**6**	5	**9**
(Rhodesia) A Pattison	4	6
(United Kingdom) **R Drysdale**	**6**	**7**
(France) É Deblicker	6	4
7	(Spain) **Á Giménez**	**7**	**6**
4	(United States) **R Lutz**	**6**	**7**
(France) Y Noah	2	5
(South Africa) **R Moore**	**7**	**6**
(United States) G Hardie	5	3
(France) P Dominguez	5	2
(Sweden) **O N Bengtson**	**7**	**6**
(United States) B Manson	4	4
5	(West Germany) **U Pinner**	**6**	**6**

Second round
1	(United States) **B Gottfried**	4	**7**	**6**
Q	(France) D Bedel	**6**	5	4
(United Kingdom) **R Drysdale**	**7**	**6**
7	(Spain) Á Giménez	5	4
4	(United States) **R Lutz**	**6**	**6**
(South Africa) R Moore	4	3
(Sweden) O N Bengtson	**6**	6	2
5	(West Germany) **U Pinner**	4	**7**	**6**

Quarterfinals
1	(United States) **B Gottfried**	**6**	**6**
(United Kingdom) R Drysdale	2	0
4	(United States) **R Lutz**	**7**	**6**
5	(West Germany) U Pinner	6	3

Semifinals
1	(United States) B Gottfried	**6**	4	4
4	(United States) **R Lutz**	1	**6**	**6**

=== Section 2 ===
First round
6	(United States) **T Gullikson**	**6**	3	**6**
Q	(Sweden) J Källqvist	1	**6**	3
(France) **B Fritz**	**6**	**7**
(Australia) J James	4	6
(France) G Moretton	2	3
(France) **P Proisy**	**6**	**6**
(Paraguay) **V Pecci**	**6**	**6**
3	(United States) S Smith	2	4
8	(United Kingdom) **M Cox**	**6**	**6**
(France) J-F Caujolle	1	3
(Spain) J Soler	3	4
Q	(Spain) **M Mir**	**6**	**6**
(France) P Portes	**6**	4	2
(United States) **J Austin**	1	**6**	**6**
Q	(France) **J-L Haillet**	4	**6**	**6**
2	(United Kingdom) J Lloyd	**6**	1	1

Second round
6	(United States) **T Gullikson**	**6**	**6**
(France) B Fritz	2	3
(France) **P Proisy**	**6**	2	**6**
(Paraguay) V Pecci	3	**6**	4
8	(United Kingdom) **M Cox**	**6**	**6**
Q	(Spain) M Mir	2	0
(United States) **J Austin**	4	**6**	**6**
Q	(France) J-L Haillet	**6**	2	4

Quarterfinals
6	(United States) **T Gullikson**	**7**	**6**
(France) P Proisy	5	3
8	(United Kingdom) **M Cox**	**7**	**6**
(United States) J Austin	6	4

Semifinals
6	(United States) **T Gullikson**	**6**	4	**6**
8	(United Kingdom) M Cox	3	**6**	4
