= 1975 Jean Becker Open – Doubles =

Doubles
- 1975 Paris Open
- 1974 Champions: (France) Patrice Dominguez (France) François Jauffret

Final
- Champions: (Poland) Wojciech Fibak (West Germany) Karl Meiler
- Runners-up: (Romania) Ilie Năstase (Netherlands) Tom Okker
- Score: 6–4, 7–6

Details
- Draw: 18
- Seeds: 4

Events
Singles	Doubles
← 1974 ·	Paris Open	· 1976 →

Patrice Dominguez and François Jauffret were the defending champions but lost in the first round to Arthur Ashe and Bob Hewitt.

Wojciech Fibak and Karl Meiler won in the final of the 1975 Paris Open tennis tournament 6–4, 7–6 against Ilie Năstase and Tom Okker.

== Seeds ==
Champion seeds are indicated in bold text while text in italics indicates the round in which those seeds were eliminated. All four seeded teams received byes to the second round.

1. (United States) Fred McNair / (United States) Sherwood Stewart (quarterfinals)
2. (Poland) **Wojciech Fibak** / (West Germany) **Karl Meiler (champions)**
3. (United States) Dick Stockton / (United States) Erik van Dillen (quarterfinals)
4. (Romania) Ilie Năstase / (Netherlands) Tom Okker (final)

== Draw ==
=== Key ===
- Q = Qualifier
- WC = Wild card
- LL = Lucky loser
- Alt = Alternate
- SE = Special exempt
- PR = Protected ranking
- ITF = ITF entry
- JE = Junior exempt
- w/o = Walkover
- r = Retired
- d = Defaulted
- SR = Special ranking

=== Final ===
Final
4	(Romania) Ilie Năstase (Netherlands) Tom Okker	4	6
2	(Poland) **Wojciech Fibak** (West Germany) **Karl Meiler**	**6**	**7**

=== Top half ===
First round
(Rhodesia) C Dowdeswell (South Africa) B Mitton	2	**6**	8
(Egypt) **I El Shafei** (South Africa) **R Moore**	**6**	4	**10**

Second round
1	(United States) **F McNair** (United States) **S Stewart**	**6**	**9**
(Chile) J Fillol (Colombia) I Molina	3	8
(Socialist Federal Republic of Yugoslavia) **Ž Franulović** (New Zealand) **O Parun**	w/o
(United States) J Borowiak (Pakistan) H Rahim
4	(Romania) **I Năstase** (Netherlands) **T Okker**	7	**6**	**6**
(United States) C Pasarell (United States) R Tanner	**9**	4	2
(United States) E Dibbs (Argentina) G Vilas
(Egypt) **I El Shafei** (South Africa) **R Moore**	w/o

Quarterfinals
1	(United States) F McNair (United States) S Stewart	8	**6**	5
(Socialist Federal Republic of Yugoslavia) **Ž Franulović** (New Zealand) **O Parun**	**9**	3	**7**
4	(Romania) **I Năstase** (Netherlands) **T Okker**	**6**	**7**
(Egypt) I El Shafei (South Africa) R Moore	1	5

Semifinals
(Socialist Federal Republic of Yugoslavia) Ž Franulović (New Zealand) O Parun	3	**6**	1
4	(Romania) **I Năstase** (Netherlands) **T Okker**	**6**	3	**6**

=== Bottom half ===
First round
(France) P Dominguez (France) F Jauffret	5	3
(United States) **A Ashe** (South Africa) **B Hewitt**	**7**	**6**

Second round
(United States) **A Ashe** (South Africa) **B Hewitt**	**9**	**6**
(Paraguay) V Pecci (Hungary) B Taróczy	8	1
(United States) A Neely (Sweden) T Svensson	8	4
3	(United States) **D Stockton** (United States) **E van Dillen**	**9**	**6**
(France) É Deblicker (France) G Goven	3	7
(United States) **M Estep** (Australia) **B Phillips-Moore**	**6**	**9**
(Italy) P Bertolucci (Italy) A Panatta	1	**8**	3
2	(Poland) **W Fibak** (West Germany) **K Meiler**	**6**	6	**6**

Quarterfinals
(United States) **A Ashe** (South Africa) **B Hewitt**	**6**	3	**9**
3	(United States) D Stockton (United States) E van Dillen	2	**6**	7
(United States) M Estep (Australia) B Phillips-Moore	**8**	0	4
2	(Poland) **W Fibak** (West Germany) **K Meiler**	6	**6**	**6**

Semifinals
(United States) A Ashe (South Africa) B Hewitt	6	4
2	(Poland) **W Fibak** (West Germany) **K Meiler**	**7**	**6**
