= 1979 Paris Open – Singles =

Singles
- 1979 Paris Open

Final
- Champion: (United States) Harold Solomon
- Runner-up: (Italy) Corrado Barazzutti
- Score: 6–3, 2–6, 6–3, 6–4

Details
- Draw: 32
- Seeds: 8

Events
Singles	Doubles
← 1978 ·	Paris Open	· 1980 →

Robert Lutz was the defending champion but did not compete that year.

Harold Solomon won in the final 6–3, 2–6, 6–3, 6–4 against Corrado Barazzutti.

== Seeds ==
A champion seed is indicated in bold text while text in italics indicates the round in which that seed was eliminated.

1. (United States) **Harold Solomon (champion)**
2. (United States) Brian Gottfried (semifinals)
3. (Italy) Corrado Barazzutti (final)
4. (United States) Vince Van Patten (semifinals)
5. (Mexico) Raúl Ramírez (quarterfinals)
6. (France) Pascal Portes (quarterfinals)
7. (France) Jean-Louis Haillet (quarterfinals)
8. (France) Jean-François Caujolle (quarterfinals)

== Draw ==
=== Key ===
- Q = Qualifier
- WC = Wild card
- LL = Lucky loser
- Alt = Alternate
- SE = Special exempt
- PR = Protected ranking
- ITF = ITF entry
- JE = Junior exempt
- w/o = Walkover
- r = Retired
- d = Defaulted
- SR = Special ranking
- NB: The Final was the best of 5 sets while all other rounds were the best of 3 sets.

=== Final ===
Final
1	(United States) **Harold Solomon**	**6**	2	**6**	**6**
3	(Italy) Corrado Barazzutti	3	**6**	3	4

=== Section 1 ===
First round
1	(United States) **H Solomon**	**6**	**6**
(United States) S Krulevitz	3	2
(France) **B Fritz**	6	**6**	**6**
Q	(Israel) S Glickstein	**7**	1	3
(France) D Naegelen	**7**	3	3
(Sweden) **O N Bengtson**	5	**6**	**6**
(Sweden) T Svensson	4	2
5	(Mexico) **R Ramírez**	**6**	**6**
4	(United States) **V Van Patten**	**6**	**6**
(France) C Roger-Vasselin	1	2
(United States) E Fromm	6	6
Q	(United Kingdom) **A Jarrett**	**7**	**7**
(France) **E Deblicker**	3	**7**	**6**
(France) P Proisy	**6**	6	4
(France) C Freyss	**6**	4	5
7	(France) **J-L Haillet**	2	**6**	**7**

Second round
1	(United States) **H Solomon**	1	**7**	**6**
(France) B Fritz	**6**	6	3
(Sweden) O N Bengtson	**6**	6	2
5	(Mexico) **R Ramírez**	4	**7**	**6**
4	(United States) **V Van Patten**	**6**	3	**6**
Q	(United Kingdom) A Jarrett	4	**6**	3
(France) E Deblicker	5	4
7	(France) **J-L Haillet**	**7**	**6**

Quarterfinals
1	(United States) **H Solomon**	**6**	**6**
5	(Mexico) R Ramírez	1	2
4	(United States) **V Van Patten**	**7**	**6**
7	(France) J-L Haillet	5	4

Semifinals
1	(United States) **H Solomon**	2	**6**	**6**
4	(United States) V Van Patten	**6**	3	2

=== Section 2 ===
First round
6	(France) **P Portes**	**6**	**7**
(United States) G Malin	2	6
(France) G Goven	**6**	4	4
Q	(France) **J-B Chanfreau**	2	**6**	**6**
(France) J L Cotard	2	5
(Finland) **L Palin**	**6**	**7**
(France) G Moretton	**7**	3	4
3	(Italy) **C Barazzutti**	6	**6**	**6**
8	(France) **J-F Caujolle**	**6**	**6**
Q	(Spain) J López-Maeso	3	4
(United States) **K Richardson**	**6**	**6**
(United Kingdom) J Lloyd	4	3
(France) G Toulon	1	1
(France) **P Dominguez**	**6**	**6**
(Italy) A Zugarelli	5	**6**	2
2	(United States) **B Gottfried**	**7**	4	**6**

Second round
6	(France) **P Portes**	**6**	**6**
Q	(France) J-B Chanfreau	2	3
(Finland) L Palin	**6**	3	5
3	(Italy) **C Barazzutti**	2	**6**	**7**
8	(France) **J-F Caujolle**	**6**	4	**7**
(United States) K Richardson	2	**6**	5
(France) P Dominguez	3	2
2	(United States) **B Gottfried**	**6**	**6**

Quarterfinals
6	(France) P Portes	6	r
3	(Italy) **C Barazzutti**	**7**
8	(France) J-F Caujolle	3	2
2	(United States) **B Gottfried**	**6**	**6**

Semifinals
3	(Italy) C Barazzutti	**6**	1	**8**
2	(United States) B Gottfried	4	**6**	6
