= 1979 Paris Open =

- Date: 29 October – 4 November
- Edition: 10th
- Category: Grand Prix circuit
- Draw: 32S/16D
- Prize money: $50,000
- Location: Paris, France
- Venue: Palais omnisports de Paris-Bercy

Champions

Singles
- (United States) Harold Solomon

Doubles
- (France) Jean-Louis Haillet / (France) Gilles Moretton
- Paris Open

The 1979 Paris Open was a Grand Prix tennis tournament played on indoor carpet courts. It was the 10th edition of the Paris Open (later known as the Paris Masters). It took place at the Palais omnisports de Paris-Bercy in Paris, France from 29 October through 4 November 1979. First-seeded Harold Solomon won the singles title.

== Finals ==
=== Singles ===
(United States) Harold Solomon defeated (Italy) Corrado Barazzutti 6–3, 2–6, 6–3, 6–4

- It was Solomon's 3rd title of the year and the 19th of his career.

=== Doubles ===
(France) Jean-Louis Haillet / (France) Gilles Moretton defeated (United Kingdom) John Lloyd / (United Kingdom) Tony Lloyd 7–6, 7–6

- It was Haillet's 2nd title of the year and the 3rd of his career. It was Moretton's 2nd title of the year and the 2nd of his career.
