= 1973 Jean Becker Open – Singles =

Singles
- 1973 Paris Open

Final
- Champion: (Romania) Ilie Năstase
- Runner-up: (United States) Stan Smith
- Score: 4–6, 6–1, 3–6, 6–0, 6–2

Details
- Draw: 48

Events
Singles	Doubles
← 1972 ·	Paris Open	· 1974 →

Stan Smith was the defending champion, but Ilie Năstase defeated him 4–6, 6–1, 3–6, 6–0, 6–2 in the final.

== Draw ==
=== Key ===
- Q = Qualifier
- WC = Wild card
- LL = Lucky loser
- Alt = Alternate
- SE = Special exempt
- PR = Protected ranking
- ITF = ITF entry
- JE = Junior exempt
- w/o = Walkover
- r = Retired
- d = Defaulted
- SR = Special ranking

=== Finals ===
Semifinals
(West Germany) Karl Meiler	2	0	4
(United States) Stan Smith	6	6	6
(Netherlands) Tom Okker	6	2	5
(Romania) Ilie Năstase	7	6	7

Final
(United States) Stan Smith	6	1	6	0	2
(Romania) Ilie Năstase	4	6	3	6	6

=== Top half ===
==== Section 1 ====
First round
(Colombia) I Molina	2	7	4
(Hungary) P Szőke	6	6	6
(Sweden) K Johansson	3	7	6
(France) P Dominguez	6	6	2
(Australia) B Phillips-Moore	7	3	6
(France) W N'Godrella	6	6	4
(Sweden) O N Bengtson	6	5	3
(Italy) A Zugarelli	3	7	6

Second round
(Spain) M Orantes	6	5	5
(Hungary) P Szőke	2	7	7
(Sweden) K Johansson	6	6
(United Kingdom) M Cox	1	4
(United States) M Riessen	6	4	6
(Australia) B Phillips-Moore	2	6	1
(Italy) A Zugarelli	3	5
(West Germany) K Meiler	6	7

Third round
(Hungary) P Szőke	1	1
(Sweden) K Johansson	6	6
(United States) M Riessen	2	4
(West Germany) K Meiler	6	6

Quarterfinals
(Sweden) K Johansson	2	3
(West Germany) K Meiler	6	6

==== Section 2 ====
First round
(United States) J Borowiak	0	6	6
(France) É Deblicker	6	4	2
(South Africa) T Ryan	7	0	6
(France) G Goven	5	6	2
(France) M Leclercq	4	6	2
(South Africa) F McMillan	6	3	6
(United Kingdom) G Battrick	6	6
(France) J-L Haillet	4	2

Second round
(United States) S Smith	6	6
(United States) J Borowiak	3	1
(South Africa) T Ryan	3	1
(Chile) J Fillol	6	6
(Italy) A Panatta	6	3	6
(South Africa) F McMillan	2	6	3
(United Kingdom) G Battrick	2	4
(United States) R Tanner	6	6

Third round
(United States) S Smith	6	6	6
(Chile) J Fillol	2	7	2
(Italy) A Panatta	5	3
(United States) R Tanner	7	6

Quarterfinals
(United States) S Smith	3	6	6
(United States) R Tanner	6	1	1

=== Bottom half ===
==== Section 3 ====
First round
(United Kingdom) G Stilwell	6	6	6
(Spain) A Muñoz	7	4	4
(Chile) J Pinto-Bravo	6	4	3
(France) P Proisy	4	6	6
(Australia) B Carmichael	2	4
(Spain) J Gisbert Sr.	6	6
(South Africa) R Moore	6	6
(Romania) I Țiriac	3	3

Second round
(Sweden) B Borg	7	3	7
(United Kingdom) G Stilwell	6	6	5
(France) P Proisy	4	7	5
(United States) A Ashe	6	5	7
(Argentina) G Vilas	6	6
(Spain) J Gisbert Sr.	4	2
(South Africa) R Moore	2	2
(Netherlands) T Okker	6	6

Third round
(Sweden) B Borg	5	3
(United States) A Ashe	7	6
(Argentina) G Vilas	1	1
(Netherlands) T Okker	6	6

Quarterfinals
(United States) A Ashe	1	6	3
(Netherlands) T Okker	6	3	6

==== Section 4 ====
First round
(New Zealand) O Parun	6	6
(France) B Montrenaud	4	0
(France) J-B Chanfreau	6	6
(Italy) C Barazzutti	1	3
(France) P Barthès	6	6
(Egypt) I El Shafei	4	3
(Pakistan) H Rahim	6	6
(France) F Jauffret	2	0

Second round
(United States) T Gorman	6	3	9
(New Zealand) O Parun	2	6	7
(France) J-B Chanfreau	6	7
(Socialist Federal Republic of Yugoslavia) N Pilić	2	6
(Italy) P Bertolucci	7	3
(France) P Barthès	6	0	d
(Pakistan) H Rahim	6	2	7
(Romania) I Năstase	4	6	9

Third round
(United States) T Gorman	4	4
(France) J-B Chanfreau	6	6
(Italy) P Bertolucci	2	2
(Romania) I Năstase	6	6

Quarterfinals
(France) J-B Chanfreau	3	1
(Romania) I Năstase	6	6
