= 1976 Paris Open – Doubles =

Doubles
- 1976 Paris Open
- 1975 Champions: (Poland) Wojciech Fibak (West Germany) Karl Meiler

Final
- Champions: (Netherlands) Tom Okker (United States) Marty Riessen
- Runners-up: (United States) Fred McNair (United States) Sherwood Stewart
- Score: 6–2, 6–2

Details
- Draw: 16
- Seeds: 4

Events
Singles	Doubles
← 1975 ·	Paris Open	· 1977 →

Wojciech Fibak and Karl Meiler were the defending champions but did not compete that year.

Tom Okker and Marty Riessen won in the final 6–2, 6–2 against Fred McNair and Sherwood Stewart.

== Seeds ==
Champion seeds are indicated in bold text while text in italics indicates the round in which those seeds were eliminated.

1. (Netherlands) **Tom Okker** / (United States) **Marty Riessen (champions)**
2. (United States) Fred McNair / (United States) Sherwood Stewart (final)
3. (United States) Stan Smith / (United States) Erik van Dillen (first round)
4. (United States) Eddie Dibbs / (United States) Harold Solomon (first round)

== Draw ==
=== Key ===
- Q = Qualifier
- WC = Wild card
- LL = Lucky loser
- Alt = Alternate
- SE = Special exempt
- PR = Protected ranking
- ITF = ITF entry
- JE = Junior exempt
- w/o = Walkover
- r = Retired
- d = Defaulted
- SR = Special ranking

First round
1	(Netherlands) **T Okker** (United States) **M Riessen**	**6**	**6**
(Sweden) B Andersson (Sweden) T Svensson	4	4
(United Kingdom) R Drysdale (United Kingdom) R Lewis	6	4
(Socialist Federal Republic of Yugoslavia) **Ž Franulović** (Socialist Federal Republic of Yugoslavia) **N Pilić**	**7**	**6**
3	(United States) S Smith (United States) E van Dillen	4	4
(France) **E Deblicker** (France) **P Proisy**	**6**	**6**
(Chile) A Fillol (Chile) J Fillol	6	6
(Australia) **C Dibley** (South Africa) **R Moore**	**7**	**7**
(Colombia) Á Betancur (Colombia) J Velasco, Sr.	1	1
(United Kingdom) **M Cox** (United Kingdom) **J Lloyd**	**6**	**6**
(United States) **T Moor** (United States) **N Saviano**	**6**	**6**
4	(United States) E Dibbs (United States) H Solomon	3	4
(South Africa) B Bertram (South Africa) B Mitton	**6**	4	4
(Italy) **P Bertolucci** (South Africa) **P Cramer**	1	**6**	**6**
(United States) V Amaya (Pakistan) H Rahim	2	6
2	(United States) **F McNair** (United States) **S Stewart**	**6**	**7**

Quarterfinals
1	(Netherlands) **T Okker** (United States) **M Riessen**	4	**6**	**6**
(Socialist Federal Republic of Yugoslavia) Ž Franulović (Socialist Federal Republic of Yugoslavia) N Pilić	**6**	3	3
(France) E Deblicker (France) P Proisy	1	**6**	3
(Australia) **C Dibley** (South Africa) **R Moore**	**6**	3	**6**
(United Kingdom) **M Cox** (United Kingdom) **J Lloyd**	**6**	3	**6**
(United States) T Moor (United States) N Saviano	4	**6**	3
(Italy) P Bertolucci (South Africa) P Cramer	2	5
2	(United States) **F McNair** (United States) **S Stewart**	**6**	**7**

Semifinals
1	(Netherlands) **T Okker** (United States) **M Riessen**	**6**	**6**
(Australia) C Dibley (South Africa) R Moore	4	4
(United Kingdom) M Cox (United Kingdom) J Lloyd	3	**7**	3
2	(United States) **F McNair** (United States) **S Stewart**	**6**	6	**6**

Final
1	(Netherlands) **Tom Okker** (United States) **Marty Riessen**	**6**	**6**
2	(United States) Fred McNair (United States) Sherwood Stewart	2	2
