= 1972 Jean Becker Open – Doubles =

Doubles
- 1972 Paris Open

Final
- Champions: (France) Pierre Barthès (France) François Jauffret
- Runners-up: (Spain) Andrés Gimeno (Spain) Juan Gisbert Sr.
- Score: 6–3, 6–2

Details
- Draw: 21
- Seeds: 4

Events
Singles	Doubles
← 1970 ·	Paris Open	· 1973 →

== Seeds ==
Champion seeds are indicated in bold text while text in italics indicates the round in which those seeds were eliminated. All four seeded teams received byes to the second round.

1. (South Africa) Frew McMillan / (Romania) Ilie Năstase (quarterfinals)
2. (United States) Tom Gorman / (United States) Stan Smith (quarterfinals)
3. (United States) Jimmy Connors / (Romania) Ion Țiriac (quarterfinals)
4. (Czechoslovakia) Jan Kodeš / (Czechoslovakia) František Pála (second round)

== Draw ==
=== Key ===
- Q = Qualifier
- WC = Wild card
- LL = Lucky loser
- Alt = Alternate
- SE = Special exempt
- PR = Protected ranking
- ITF = ITF entry
- JE = Junior exempt
- w/o = Walkover
- r = Retired
- d = Defaulted
- SR = Special ranking

=== Final ===
Final
(France) **Pierre Barthès** (France) **François Jauffret**	**6**	**6**
(Spain) Andrés Gimeno (Spain) Juan Gisbert Sr.	3	2

=== Top half ===
First round
(France) P Dominguez (France) P Proisy	4	3
(Italy) **E Di Matteo** (Italy) **A Zugarelli**	**6**	**6**
(France) **J-C Barclay** (United States) **J McManus**	**6**	**6**
(Hungary) R Machán (Hungary) B Taróczy	4	4

Second round
1	(South Africa) **F McMillan** (Romania) **I Năstase**	**6**	**6**
(France) A Bouteleux (France) M Leclercq	1	1
(Hungary) S Baranyi (Hungary) P Szőke	6	3
(France) **P Barthès** (France) **F Jauffret**	**7**	**6**
4	(Czechoslovakia) J Kodeš (Czechoslovakia) F Pála	4	**7**	5
(Italy) **E Di Matteo** (Italy) **A Zugarelli**	**6**	6	**7**
(France) J-C Barclay (United States) J McManus	**7**	2	3
(Australia) **C Dibley** (Chile) **J Fillol**	6	**6**	**6**

Quarterfinals
1	(South Africa) F McMillan (Romania) I Năstase	5	**6**	3
(France) **P Barthès** (France) **F Jauffret**	**7**	3	**6**
(Italy) E Di Matteo (Italy) A Zugarelli	2	0
(Australia) **C Dibley** (Chile) **J Fillol**	**6**	**6**

Semifinals
(France) **P Barthès** (France) **F Jauffret**	**6**	**7**
(Australia) C Dibley (Chile) J Fillol	4	5

=== Bottom half ===
First round
(Italy) **C Barazzutti** (Italy) **P Bertolucci**	4	**7**	**6**
(France) T Bernasconi (France) J-P Meyer	**6**	6	4
(Australia) **B Phillips-Moore** (Socialist Federal Republic of Yugoslavia) **N Špear**	4	**6**	**13**
(France) J-B Chanfreau (France) D Contet	**6**	4	11
(Czechoslovakia) **J Hřebec** (Czechoslovakia) **V Zednik**	**6**	**6**
(France) G Goven (France) W N'Godrella	3	4

Second round
(Spain) **A Gimeno** (Spain) **J Gisbert Sr.**	**6**	2	**6**
(Italy) C Barazzutti (Italy) P Bertolucci	2	**6**	2
(Australia) B Phillips-Moore (Socialist Federal Republic of Yugoslavia) N Špear	3	**6**	4
3	(United States) **J Connors** (Romania) **I Țiriac**	**6**	2	**6**
(New Zealand) O Parun (Rhodesia) A Pattison	**6**	3	5
(Czechoslovakia) **J Hřebec** (Czechoslovakia) **V Zednik**	3	**6**	**7**
(France) É Deblicker (France) B Paul	0	3
2	(United States) **T Gorman** (United States) **S Smith**	**6**	**6**

Quarterfinals
(Spain) **A Gimeno** (Spain) **J Gisbert Sr.**	**7**	**7**
3	(United States) J Connors (Romania) I Țiriac	5	6
(Czechoslovakia) **J Hřebec** (Czechoslovakia) **V Zednik**	**6**	4	**6**
2	(United States) T Gorman (United States) S Smith	4	**6**	3

Semifinals
(Spain) **A Gimeno** (Spain) **J Gisbert Sr.**	6	**6**	**6**
(Czechoslovakia) J Hřebec (Czechoslovakia) V Zednik	**7**	3	4
