= 1976 Paris Open – Singles =

Singles
- 1976 Paris Open

Final
- Champion: (United States) Eddie Dibbs
- Runner-up: (Chile) Jaime Fillol
- Score: 5–7, 6–4, 6–4, 7–6

Details
- Draw: 32
- Seeds: 8

Events
Singles	Doubles
← 1975 ·	Paris Open	· 1977 →

The 1976 Paris Open singles tournament took place at the Palais omnisports de Paris-Bercy from October 25. Tom Okker was the defending champion, but lost in the quarter-finals to Jaime Fillol.

Eddie Dibbs won in the final 5–7, 6–4, 6–4, 7–6, against Fillol.

== Seeds ==
A champion seed is indicated in bold text while text in italics indicates the round in which that seed was eliminated.

1. (United States) Harold Solomon (second round)
2. (United States) **Eddie Dibbs (champion)**
3. (Netherlands) Tom Okker (quarterfinals)
4. (United States) Stan Smith (semifinals)
5. (Chile) Jaime Fillol (final)
6. (France) François Jauffret (first round)
7. (Italy) Paolo Bertolucci (quarterfinals)
8. (South Africa) Raymond Moore (first round)

== Draw ==
=== Key ===
- Q = Qualifier
- WC = Wild card
- LL = Lucky loser
- Alt = Alternate
- SE = Special exempt
- PR = Protected ranking
- ITF = ITF entry
- JE = Junior exempt
- w/o = Walkover
- r = Retired
- d = Defaulted
- SR = Special ranking
- NB: The Semifinals and Final were the best of 5 sets while all other rounds were the best of 3 sets.

=== Final ===
Final
5	(Chile) Jaime Fillol	**7**	4	4	6
2	(United States) **Eddie Dibbs**	5	**6**	**6**	**7**

=== Section 1 ===
Second round
1	(United States) **H Solomon**	4	**6**	**6**
(South Africa) B Bertram	**6**	2	2
Q	(Sweden) J Norbäck	**7**	2	5
(United States) **E van Dillen**	5	**6**	**7**
(United Kingdom) R Drysdale	1	3
(United Kingdom) **M Cox**	**6**	**6**
(United States) **F McNair**	**7**	**6**
8	(South Africa) R Moore	6	0

Quarterfinals
1	(United States) H Solomon	**6**	4	4
(United States) **E van Dillen**	3	**6**	**6**
(United Kingdom) **M Cox**	**6**	**7**
(United States) F McNair	4	5

Semifinals
(United States) E van Dillen	4	**6**	2
(United Kingdom) **M Cox**	**6**	1	**6**
Semifinals
(Netherlands) T Okker	4	3	6
5	(Chile) **J Fillol**	**6**	**6**

=== Section 2 ===
Second round
6	(France) F Jauffret	2	4
(United States) **S Stewart**	**6**	**6**
(France) **P Proisy**	6	**6**	**6**
(Socialist Federal Republic of Yugoslavia) N Pilić	**7**	3	2
(Australia) C Dibley	5	4
(South Africa) **B Mitton**	**7**	**6**
(France) E Deblicker	**7**	1	4
4	(United States) **S Smith**	5	**6**	**6**

Quarterfinals
(United States) **S Stewart**	**6**	**6**
(France) P Proisy	3	3
(South Africa) B Mitton	4	**6**	3
4	(United States) **S Smith**	**6**	4	**6**

Semifinals
(United States) S Stewart	4	2
4	(United States) **S Smith**	**6**	**6**
Semifinals
4	(Italy) P Bertolucci	6	6	4
2	(United States) **E Dibbs**	2	**7**
