= 1974 Jean Becker Open – Singles =

Singles
- 1974 Jean Becker Open

Final
- Champion: (United States) Brian Gottfried
- Runner-up: (United States) Eddie Dibbs
- Score: 6–3, 5–7, 8–6, 6–0

Details
- Draw: 32

Events
Singles	Doubles
← 1973 ·	Paris Masters	· 1975 →

The 1974 Paris Open – Singles was an event of the 1974 Paris Open tennis tournament and was played on indoor carpet courts at the Palais omnisports de Paris-Bercy in Paris, France from 28 October through 3 November 1974. The draw comprised 32 players. Ilie Năstase was the defending Paris Open singles champion but did not compete in this edition. Brian Gottfried won the title by defeating Eddie Dibbs in the final, 6–3, 5–7, 8–6, 6–0.

== Draw ==
=== Key ===
- Q = Qualifier
- WC = Wild card
- LL = Lucky loser
- Alt = Alternate
- SE = Special exempt
- PR = Protected ranking
- ITF = ITF entry
- JE = Junior exempt
- w/o = Walkover
- r = Retired
- d = Defaulted
- SR = Special ranking
- NB: The semifinals and final were the best of 5 sets while all other rounds were the best of 3 sets.

=== Final ===
Final
(United States) Brian Gottfried	6	5	8	6
(United States) Eddie Dibbs	3	7	6	0

=== Section 1 ===
Second round
(United States) A Ashe	6	6
(France) E Deblicker	3	2
(France) P Dominguez	6	6
(Brazil) J E Mandarino	0	3
(France) F Jauffret	4	8
(Brazil) T Koch	6	9
(Argentina) J Ganzábal	6	6
(United States) S Krulevitz	3	2

Quarterfinals
(United States) A Ashe	7	6
(France) P Dominguez	5	2
(Brazil) T Koch	6	6
(Argentina) J Ganzábal	4	4

Semifinals
(United States) A Ashe	6	2	6
(Brazil) T Koch	4	6	2
Semifinals
(United States) B Gottfried	6	3	1
(United States) C Pasarell	9	6	1

=== Section 2 ===
Second round
(Australia) B Phillips-Moore	6	6	8
(France) P Proisy	1	8	6
(France) D Contet	4	3
(Chile) J Fillol	6	6
(Italy) A Zugarelli	6	6
(France) P Beust	0	2
(France) J-L Haillet	2	6	2
(United States) H Solomon	6	4	6

Quarterfinals
(Australia) B Phillips-Moore	3	4
(Chile) J Fillol	6	6
(Italy) A Zugarelli	3	2
(United States) H Solomon	6	6

Semifinals
(Chile) J Fillol	6	7
(United States) H Solomon	2	5
Semifinals
(United States) E Dibbs	6	5	2
(Argentina) G Vilas	1	7	6
