= 1976 Jean Becker Open =

Tennis tournament

1976 Paris Open
- Date: 25–31 October
- Edition: 7th
- Draw: 32S / 16D
- Prize money: $50,000
- Surface: Carpet / indoor
- Location: Paris, France
- Venue: Palais omnisports de Paris-Bercy

Champions

Singles
- (United States) Eddie Dibbs

Doubles
- (Netherlands) Tom Okker / (United States) Marty Riessen
- Paris Open

The 1976 Jean Becker Open, also known as the Paris Open, was a Grand Prix men's tennis tournament played on indoor carpet courts. It was the 7th edition of the Paris Open (later known as the Paris Masters). It took place at the Palais omnisports de Paris-Bercy in Paris, France from 25 October through 31 October 1976. Eddie Dibbs won the singles title.

== Finals ==
=== Singles ===
(United States) Eddie Dibbs defeated (Chile) Jaime Fillol 5–7, 6–4, 6–4, 7–6

- It was Dibbs' 5th title of the year and the 11th of his career.

=== Doubles ===
(Netherlands) Tom Okker / (United States) Marty Riessen defeated (United States) Fred McNair / (United States) Sherwood Stewart 6–2, 6–2

- It was Okker's 3rd title of the year and the 64th of his career. It was Riessen's 5th title of the year and the 46th of his career.
