= 1975 Jean Becker Open – Singles =

Singles
- 1975 Paris Open

Final
- Champion: (Netherlands) Tom Okker
- Runner-up: (United States) Arthur Ashe
- Score: 6–3, 2–6, 6–3, 3–6, 6–4

Details
- Draw: 32
- Seeds: 8

Events
Singles	Doubles
← 1974 ·	Paris Open	· 1976 →

Brian Gottfried was the defending champion, but did not compete that year.

Tom Okker won in the final, 6–3, 2–6, 6–3, 3–6, 6–4, against Arthur Ashe.

== Seeds ==
A champion seed is indicated in bold text while text in italics indicates the round in which that seed was eliminated.

1. (Argentina) Guillermo Vilas (second round)
2. (United States) Arthur Ashe (final)
3. (Romania) Ilie Năstase (semifinals)
4. (Chile) Jaime Fillol (quarterfinals)
5. (Italy) Adriano Panatta (first round)
6. (United States) Eddie Dibbs (quarterfinals)
7. (New Zealand) Onny Parun (quarterfinals)
8. (United States) Roscoe Tanner (quarterfinals)

== Draw ==
=== Key ===
- Q = Qualifier
- WC = Wild card
- LL = Lucky loser
- Alt = Alternate
- SE = Special exempt
- PR = Protected ranking
- ITF = ITF entry
- JE = Junior exempt
- w/o = Walkover
- r = Retired
- d = Defaulted
- SR = Special ranking
- NB: The Semifinals and Final were the best of 5 sets while all other rounds were the best of 3 sets.

=== Final ===
Final
	(Netherlands) **Tom Okker**	**6**	2	**6**	3	**6**
2	(United States) Arthur Ashe	3	**6**	3	**6**	4

=== Section 1 ===
Second round
1	(Argentina) **G Vilas**	**6**	**6**
Q	(Australia) B Phillips-Moore	2	0
(South Africa) **R Moore**	**6**	8	**6**
Q	(Sweden) O N Bengtson	2	**9**	2
(United States) S Stewart	7	3
(South Africa) **B Mitton**	**9**	**6**
Q	(Pakistan) H Rahim	2	3
8	(United States) **R Tanner**	**6**	**6**

Quarterfinals
1	(Argentina) G Vilas	**6**	5	3
(South Africa) **R Moore**	4	**7**	**6**
(South Africa) B Mitton	6	7
8	(United States) **R Tanner**	**8**	**9**

Semifinals
(South Africa) **R Moore**	**9**	**6**
8	(United States) R Tanner	7	4
Semifinals
(Chile) J Fillol	1	4	3
(Netherlands) **T Okker**	**6**	**6**

=== Section 2 ===
Second round
6	(United States) **E Dibbs**	**6**	**6**
SE	(United States) C Pasarell	2	3
(France) **G Goven**	**6**	**6**
(United States) J Borowiak	4	2
(Paraguay) **V Pecci**	**6**	**6**
(Socialist Federal Republic of Yugoslavia) Z Franulović	1	2
(Egypt) I El Shafei	8	4
3	(Romania) **I Năstase**	**9**	**6**

Quarterfinals
6	(United States) **E Dibbs**	**6**	5	**6**
(France) G Goven	4	**7**	0
(Paraguay) V Pecci	4	2
3	(Romania) **I Năstase**	**6**	**6**

Semifinals
6	(United States) E Dibbs	3	**6**	3
3	(Romania) **I Năstase**	**6**	3	**6**
Semifinals
3	(New Zealand) O Parun	4	0	3
2	(United States) **A Ashe**	2	**6**
