= 1970 Paris Open – Singles =

Singles
- 1970 Paris Open

Final
- Champion: (United States) Arthur Ashe
- Runner-up: (United States) Marty Riessen
- Score: 7–6, 6–4, 6–3

Details
- Draw: 32
- Seeds: 8

Events
Singles	Doubles
← 1969 ·	Paris Open	· 1972 →

The 1970 Paris Open – Singles was an event of the 1970 Paris Open men's tennis tournament that was played at the Palais Omnisports in Paris, France from 9 November until 15 November 1970. The draw comprised 32 players and eight were seeded. Third-seeded Arthur Ashe won the singles title, defeating unseeded Marty Riessen in the final, 7–6, 6–4, 6–3.

== Seeds ==
A champion seed is indicated in bold text while text in italics indicates the round in which that seed was eliminated.

1. (Australia) Rod Laver (first round)
2. (Australia) Ken Rosewall (quarterfinals)
3. (United States) **Arthur Ashe (champion)**
4. (Netherlands) Tom Okker (first round)
5. (United States) Cliff Richey (second round)
6. (Spain) Andrés Gimeno (second round)
7. (Australia) Roy Emerson (second round)
8. (United States) Pancho Gonzales (quarterfinals)

== Draw ==
=== Key ===
- Q = Qualifier
- WC = Wild card
- LL = Lucky loser
- Alt = Alternate
- SE = Special exempt
- PR = Protected ranking
- ITF = ITF entry
- JE = Junior exempt
- w/o = Walkover
- r = Retired
- d = Defaulted
- SR = Special ranking
- NB: The Semifinals and Final were the best of 5 sets while all other rounds were the best of 3 sets.

=== Final ===
Final
3	(United States) **Arthur Ashe**	**7**	**6**	**6**
	(United States) Marty Riessen	6	4	3

=== Section 1 ===
Second round
2	(Australia) **K Rosewall**	**6**	**6**
Q	(France) P Proisy	1	2
(United States) **C Graebner**	**7**	3	**6**
(France) F Jauffret	6	**6**	4
(France) **G Goven**	**6**	**6**
(Socialist Federal Republic of Yugoslavia) N Pilić	3	4
(Australia) R Ruffels	2	4
7	(Australia) **R Emerson**	**6**	**6**

Quarterfinals
2	(Australia) **K Rosewall**	3	**6**	**6**
(United States) C Graebner	**6**	4	4
(France) **G Goven**	**7**	**6**
7	(Australia) R Emerson	5	4

Semifinals
2	(Australia) K Rosewall	6	2
(France) **G Goven**	**7**	**6**
Semifinals
(United States) **A Ashe**	**6**	6	3
(United Kingdom) R Taylor	**7**	**7**	2

=== Section 2 ===
Second round
5	(United States) **C Richey**	**6**	**6**
(France) P Barthès	3	2
(United States) **S Smith**	**6**	**6**
(Australia) B Carmichael	4	0
(United States) **D Ralston**	6	**6**	**6**
Q	(South Africa) R Moore	**7**	4	2
(France) **J-B Chanfreau**	6	**7**	**6**
4	(Netherlands) T Okker	**7**	6	4

Quarterfinals
5	(United States) C Richey	3	2
(United States) **S Smith**	**6**	**6**
(United States) **D Ralston**	**7**	5	**7**
(France) J-B Chanfreau	6	**7**	6

Semifinals
(United States) **S Smith**	**7**	**6**
(United States) D Ralston	5	4
Semifinals
(United States) P Gonzales	6	0	6
(United States) **M Riessen**	**6**	**6**
