= 1979 Paris Open – Doubles =

Doubles
- 1979 Paris Open
- 1978 Champions: (United States) Bruce Manson (Rhodesia) Andrew Pattison

Final
- Champions: (France) Jean-Louis Haillet (France) Gilles Moretton
- Runners-up: (United Kingdom) John Lloyd (United Kingdom) Tony Lloyd
- Score: 7–6, 7–6

Details
- Draw: 16
- Seeds: 4

Events
Singles	Doubles
- Paris Open

Bruce Manson and Andrew Pattison were the defending champions but did not compete that year.

Jean-Louis Haillet and Gilles Moretton won in the final 7–6, 7–6 against John Lloyd and Tony Lloyd.

== Seeds ==
Champion seeds are indicated in bold text while text in italics indicates the round in which those seeds were eliminated.

1. (France) **Jean-Louis Haillet** / (France) **Gilles Moretton (champions)**
2. (Italy) Corrado Barazzutti / (Italy) Antonio Zugarelli (quarterfinals)
3. (France) Patrice Dominguez / (France) Denis Naegelen (first round)
4. (France) Bernard Fritz / (United States) Keith Richardson (semifinals)

== Draw ==
Key

- Q = Qualifier
- WC = Wild card
- LL = Lucky loser
- Alt = Alternate
- ITF = ITF entry
- PR = Protected ranking
- SR = Special ranking
- SE = Special exempt
- JE = Junior exempt
- JR = Junior Accelerator Programme entrant
- CO = College Accelerator Programme entrant
- NG = Next Gen Accelerator Program entrant
- w/o = Walkover
- r = Retired
- d = Defaulted

First round
1	(France) **J-L Haillet** (France) **G Moretton**	**7**	**7**
(Sweden) O N Bengtson (Sweden) T Svensson	6	6
(France) J-B Chanfreau (France) G Toulon	6	**7**	3
(France) **E Deblicker** (France) **P Proisy**	**7**	5	**6**
4	(France) **B Fritz** (United States) **K Richardson**	4	**6**	**15**
(United States) G Malin (United States) V Van Patten	**6**	2	13
(Spain) **M Mir** (Spain) **R Vizcaino**	**6**	**6**
(South Africa) F Punčec (France) H Theron	1	2
(Israel) **S Glickstein** (United States) **C Leeds**	4	**7**	**6**
(France) J-F Caujolle (France) P Portes	**6**	6	2
(United Kingdom) **J Lloyd** (United Kingdom) **T Lloyd**	**6**	**6**
3	(France) P Dominguez (France) D Naegelen	4	3
(France) G Goven (France) C Roger-Vasselin	**6**	3	2
(United States) **S Krulevitz** (United States) **H Solomon**	1	**6**	**6**
(United States) E Fromm (Finland) L Palin	5	**6**	8
2	(Italy) **C Barazzutti** (Italy) **A Zugarelli**	**7**	2	**10**

Quarterfinals
1	(France) **J-L Haillet** (France) **G Moretton**	w/o
(France) E Deblicker (France) P Proisy
4	(France) **B Fritz** (United States) **K Richardson**	**7**	**6**
(Spain) M Mir (Spain) R Vizcaino	6	1
(Israel) S Glickstein (United States) C Leeds	2	4
(United Kingdom) **J Lloyd** (United Kingdom) **T Lloyd**	**6**	**6**
(United States) **S Krulevitz** (United States) **H Solomon**	**6**	**6**
2	(Italy) C Barazzutti (Italy) A Zugarelli	4	4

Semifinals
1	(France) **J-L Haillet** (France) **G Moretton**	**6**	4	**6**
4	(France) B Fritz (United States) K Richardson	4	**6**	1
(United Kingdom) **J Lloyd** (United Kingdom) **T Lloyd**	**6**	3	**6**
(United States) S Krulevitz (United States) H Solomon	3	**6**	0

Final
1	(France) **Jean-Louis Haillet** (France) **Gilles Moretton**	**7**	**7**
(United Kingdom) John Lloyd (United Kingdom) Tony Lloyd	6	6
