= 1969 Paris Open =

- Date: 5–11 November
- Edition: 1st
- Draw: 24S
- Surface: Carpet / indoor
- Location: Paris, France
- Venue: Stade Coubertin

Champions

Singles
- (Netherlands) Tom Okker

Doubles
- (Australia) John Newcombe / (Australia) Tony Roche
| Paris Open | · 1970 → |

The 1969 Paris Open, also known as the French Open Covered Court Championships, was a professional men's tennis tournament played on indoor carpet courts at the Stade Coubertin in Paris, France. It was the 1st edition of the Paris Open (later known as the Paris Masters) and was held from 5 November until 11 November 1969. Third-seeded Tom Okker won the singles title.

== Finals ==
=== Singles ===
(Netherlands) Tom Okker defeated (United States) Butch Buchholz 8–6, 6–2, 6–1

- It was Okker's 8th singles title of the year and the 12th of his career in the open era.

=== Doubles ===
(Australia) John Newcombe / (Australia) Tony Roche defeated (Netherlands) Tom Okker / (United States) Marty Riessen 10–8, 6–4, 6–2
