= 1977 Jean Becker Open – Doubles =

Doubles
- 1977 Jean Becker Open
- 1976 Champions: (Netherlands) Tom Okker (United States) Marty Riessen

Final
- Champions: (United States) Brian Gottfried (Mexico) Raúl Ramírez
- Runners-up: (United States) Jeff Borowiak (United Kingdom) Roger Taylor
- Score: 6–2, 6–0

Details
- Draw: 16
- Seeds: 4

Events
Singles	Doubles
- Paris Masters

Tom Okker and Marty Riessen were the defending champions but did not compete that year.

Brian Gottfried and Raúl Ramírez won the doubles title in the final of the 1977 Paris Open tennis tournament 6–2, 6–0 against Jeff Borowiak and Roger Taylor.

== Seeds ==
Champion seeds are indicated in bold text while text in italics indicates the round in which those seeds were eliminated.

1. (United States) **Brian Gottfried** / (Mexico) **Raúl Ramírez (champions)**
2. (United States) Robert Lutz / (South Africa) Raymond Moore (quarterfinals)
3. (South Africa) Byron Bertram / (South Africa) Bernard Mitton (semifinals)
4. (France) Patrice Dominguez / (France) Jean-Louis Haillet (first round)

== Draw ==
Key

- Q = Qualifier
- WC = Wild card
- LL = Lucky loser
- Alt = Alternate
- ITF = ITF entry
- PR = Protected ranking
- SR = Special ranking
- SE = Special exempt
- JE = Junior exempt
- JR = Junior Accelerator Programme entrant
- CO = College Accelerator Programme entrant
- NG = Next Gen Accelerator Program entrant
- w/o = Walkover
- r = Retired
- d = Defaulted

First round
1	(United States) **B Gottfried** (Mexico) **R Ramírez**	**6**	**6**
(United States) T Leonard (United States) M Machette	1	2
(Denmark) L Elvstrøm (Hungary) P Szőke	1	6
(United States) **R Fisher** (United States) **B Teacher**	**6**	**7**
4	(France) P Dominguez (France) J-L Haillet	2	5
(France) **E Deblicker** (France) **P Proisy**	**6**	**7**
(France) **D Bedel** (France) **G Toulon**	**7**	**6**
(United States) T Carey (United States) S Shannon	6	3
(Morocco) O Laimina (Australia) B Phillips-Moore	**6**	3	2
(United States) **E Friedler** (Australia) **B Lloyd**	2	**6**	**6**
(United States) G Núñez (United States) C Sylvan	1	**6**	0
3	(South Africa) **B Bertram** (South Africa) **B Mitton**	**6**	3	**6**
(United States) **J Borowiak** (United Kingdom) **R Taylor**	**6**	**6**
(Sweden) O N Bengtson (Sweden) D Palm	1	3
(France) G Goven (France) C Roger-Vasselin
2	(United States) **R Lutz** (South Africa) **R Moore**	w/o

Quarterfinals
1	(United States) **B Gottfried** (Mexico) **R Ramírez**	**6**	**6**
(United States) R Fisher (United States) B Teacher	2	4
(France) **E Deblicker** (France) **P Proisy**	1	**6**	**6**
(France) D Bedel (France) G Toulon	**6**	4	0
(United States) E Friedler (Australia) B Lloyd	0	0
3	(South Africa) **B Bertram** (South Africa) **B Mitton**	**6**	**6**
(United States) **J Borowiak** (United Kingdom) **R Taylor**	**7**	**7**
2	(United States) R Lutz (South Africa) R Moore	6	6

Semifinals
1	(United States) **B Gottfried** (Mexico) **R Ramírez**	**6**	**6**
(France) E Deblicker (France) P Proisy	1	3
3	(South Africa) B Bertram (South Africa) B Mitton	3	**6**	4
(United States) **J Borowiak** (United Kingdom) **R Taylor**	**6**	2	**6**

Final
1	(United States) **Brian Gottfried** (Mexico) **Raúl Ramírez**	**6**	**6**
(United States) Jeff Borowiak (United Kingdom) Roger Taylor	2	0
