= 1975 Jean Becker Open =

- Date: 27 October – 2 November
- Edition: 6th
- Category: Grand Prix circuit
- Draw: 32S / 32D
- Prize money: $50,000
- Surface: Carpet / indoor
- Location: Paris, France
- Venue: Palais omnisports de Paris-Bercy

Champions

Singles
- (Netherlands) Tom Okker

Doubles
- (Poland) Wojciech Fibak / (West Germany) Karl Meiler
- Paris Masters

The 1975 Jean Becker Open, also known as the Paris Open, was a Grand Prix men's tennis tournament played on indoor carpet courts. It was the 6th edition of the Paris Open (later known as the Paris Masters). It took place at the Palais omnisports de Paris-Bercy in Paris, France from 27 October through 2 November 1975. Tom Okker won the singles title.

== Finals ==
=== Singles ===
(Netherlands) Tom Okker defeated (United States) Arthur Ashe 6–3, 2–6, 6–3, 3–6, 6–4

- It was Okker's 6th title of the year and the 61st of his career.

=== Doubles ===
(Poland) Wojciech Fibak / (West Germany) Karl Meiler defeated (Romania) Ilie Năstase / (Netherlands) Tom Okker 6–4, 7–6

- It was Fibak's 4th title of the year and the 4th of his career. It was Meiler's 2nd title of the year and the 11th of his career.
