= 1972 Jean Becker Open – Singles =

Singles
- 1972 Paris Open

Final
- Champion: (United States) Stan Smith
- Runner-up: (Spain) Andrés Gimeno
- Score: 6–2, 6–2, 7–5

Details
- Draw: 32
- Seeds: 3

Events
Singles	Doubles
← 1970 ·	Paris Open	· 1973 →

First-seeded Stan Smith won the singles title at the 1972 Paris Open by defeating third-seeded Andrés Gimeno in the final 6–2, 6–2, 7–5.

== Seeds ==
A champion seed is indicated in bold text while text in italics indicates the round in which that seed was eliminated.

1. (United States) **Stan Smith (champion)**
2. (Romania) Ilie Năstase (quarterfinals)
3. (Spain) Andrés Gimeno (final)
4. n/a

== Draw ==
=== Key ===
- Q = Qualifier
- WC = Wild card
- LL = Lucky loser
- Alt = Alternate
- SE = Special exempt
- PR = Protected ranking
- ITF = ITF entry
- JE = Junior exempt
- w/o = Walkover
- r = Retired
- d = Defaulted
- SR = Special ranking
- NB: The Semifinals and Final were the best of 5 sets while all other rounds were the best of 3 sets.

=== Final ===
Final
1	(United States) **Stan Smith**	**6**	**6**	**7**
3	(Spain) Andrés Gimeno	2	2	5

=== Section 1 ===
Second round
1	(United States) **S Smith**	6	**7**	**6**
Q	(Hungary) P Szőke	**7**	6	2
(South Africa) F McMillan	2	0
(France) **G Goven**	**6**	**6**
(Rhodesia) A Pattison	4	5
(France) **P Dominguez**	**6**	**7**
(Chile) **J Fillol**	**6**	**6**
(Spain) J Gisbert Sr.	3	4

Quarterfinals
1	(United States) **S Smith**	3	**6**	**6**
(France) G Goven	**6**	3	1
(France) **P Dominguez**	**7**	**6**
(Chile) J Fillol	6	3

Semifinals
1	(United States) **S Smith**	**6**	**6**
(France) P Dominguez	2	4
Semifinals
1	(South Africa) R Moore	**6**	4	**6**
(Czechoslovakia) **J Kodeš**	2	**6**	**6**

=== Section 2 ===
Second round
Q	(France) J-P Meyer	3	5
(France) **P Proisy**	**6**	**7**
Q	(Italy) A Zugarelli	0	0
(United States) **J Connors**	**6**	**6**
(Czechoslovakia) V Zedník	2	4
(Australia) **C Dibley**	**6**	**6**
(Hungary) S Baranyi	3	**6**	4
3	(Spain) **A Gimeno**	**6**	2	**6**

Quarterfinals
(France) P Proisy	3	1
(United States) **J Connors**	**6**	**6**
(Australia) C Dibley	3	4
3	(Spain) **A Gimeno**	**6**	**6**

Semifinals
(United States) J Connors	**6**	4	4
3	(Spain) **A Gimeno**	4	**6**	**6**
Semifinals
3	(United States) **T Gorman**	3	**7**	**7**
2	(Romania) I Năstase	3	6	3
