= 1977 Jean Becker Open – Singles =

Singles
- 1977 Jean Becker Open

Final
- Champion: (Italy) Corrado Barazzutti
- Runner-up: (United States) Brian Gottfried
- Score: 7–6, 7–6, 6–7, 3–6, 6–4

Details
- Draw: 32
- Seeds: 2

Events
Singles	Doubles
- Paris Masters

Eddie Dibbs was the defending champion but did not compete that year.

Corrado Barazzutti won in the final 7–6, 7–6, 6–7, 3–6, 6–4 against Brian Gottfried.

== Seeds ==
Text in italics indicates the round seeds were eliminated.

1. (United States) Brian Gottfried (final)
2. (Mexico) Raúl Ramírez (first round)

== Draw ==
Key

- Q = Qualifier
- WC = Wild card
- LL = Lucky loser
- Alt = Alternate
- ITF = ITF entry
- PR = Protected ranking
- SR = Special ranking
- SE = Special exempt
- JE = Junior exempt
- JR = Junior Accelerator Programme entrant
- CO = College Accelerator Programme entrant
- NG = Next Gen Accelerator Program entrant
- w/o = Walkover
- r = Retired
- d = Defaulted
- NB: The Semifinals and Final were the best of 5 sets while all other rounds were the best of 3 sets.

=== Final ===
Final
1	(United States) Brian Gottfried	6	6	7	6	4
	(Italy) Corrado Barazzutti	7	7	6	3	6

=== Section 1 ===
First round
1	(United States) B Gottfried	6	6	6
Q	(Hungary) P Szőke	1	7	2
(United States) B Teacher	7	7
(United States) T Leonard	5	5
(United States) M Machette	4	6	6
Q	(France) P Portes	6	3	4
(South Africa) B Mitton	3	4
(United States) R Lutz	6	6
(United Kingdom) M Cox	6	6
(France) G Goven	1	3
(United Kingdom) R Taylor	7	2	8
(France) J-L Haillet	6	6	6
(United States) E Friedler	2	6	4
Q	(France) P Barthès	6	2	6
(France) P Proisy	6	3	6
(Italy) P Bertolucci	1	6	3

Second round
1	(United States) B Gottfried	6	6
(United States) B Teacher	3	2
(United States) M Machette	4	2
(United States) R Lutz	6	6
(United Kingdom) M Cox	6	6
(United Kingdom) R Taylor	3	4
Q	(France) P Barthès	7	6
(France) P Proisy	5	3

Quarterfinals
1	(United States) B Gottfried	6	7
(United States) R Lutz	4	5
(United Kingdom) M Cox	7	6
Q	(France) P Barthès	5	2

Semifinals
1	(United States) Brian Gottfried	6	7	6
(United Kingdom) Mark Cox	4	6	1

=== Section 2 ===
First round
(United States) C Sylvan	6	6
(Australia) B Phillips-Moore	3	4
(Sweden) J Norbäck	1	4
(Sweden) O N Bengtson	6	6
(South Africa) R Moore	6	6	3
(United Kingdom) J Lloyd	2	7	6
(France) C Roger-Vasselin	1	2
(Italy) C Barazzutti	6	6
(United States) J Borowiak	1	6	6
(Sweden) D Palm	6	3	2
(France) É Deblicker	4	3
(United States) R Fisher	6	6
Q	(France) G Toulon	2	3
(Denmark) L Elvstrøm	6	6
(South Africa) B Bertram	7	6
2	(Mexico) R Ramírez	6	2

Second round
(United States) C Sylvan	6	6
(Sweden) O N Bengtson	4	0
(United Kingdom) J Lloyd	6	4	0
(Italy) C Barazzutti	3	6	6
(United States) J Borowiak	6	6
(United States) R Fisher	2	3
(Denmark) L Elvstrøm	1	4
(South Africa) B Bertram	6	6

Quarterfinals
(United States) C Sylvan	2	3
(Italy) C Barazzutti	6	6
(United States) J Borowiak	6	6
(South Africa) B Bertram	4	4

Semifinals
(Italy) Corrado Barazzutti	6	7	6
(United States) Jeff Borowiak	4	6	1
