= 1969 Paris Open – Singles =

Singles
- 1969 Paris Open

Final
- Champion: (Netherlands) Tom Okker
- Runner-up: (United States) Butch Buchholz
- Score: 8–6, 6–2, 6–1

Details
- Draw: 24
- Seeds: 4

Events
Singles	Doubles
← 1968 ·	Paris Open	· 1970 →

This was the first edition of the event.

Tom Okker won the title, defeating Butch Buchholz 8–6, 6–2, 6–1 in the final.

== Seeds ==
All four seeds received a bye to the second round.

1. (Australia) Tony Roche (semifinals)
2. (Australia) John Newcombe (quarterfinals)
3. (Netherlands) Tom Okker (champion)
4. (United States) Butch Buchholz (final)

== Draw ==
=== Key ===
- Q = Qualifier
- WC = Wild card
- LL = Lucky loser
- Alt = Alternate
- ITF = ITF entry
- PR = Protected ranking
- SR = Special ranking
- SE = Special exempt
- JE = Junior exempt
- JR = Junior Accelerator Programme entrant
- CO = College Accelerator Programme entrant
- NG = Next Gen Accelerator Program entrant
- w/o = Walkover
- r = Retired
- d = Defaulted

=== Final ===
Semifinals
1	(Australia) Tony Roche	2	3	3
3	(Netherlands) Tom Okker	6	6	6
4	(United States) Butch Buchholz	9	6	4	6
(United States) Marty Riessen	7	1	6	3

Final
3	(Netherlands) Tom Okker	8	6	6
4	(United States) Butch Buchholz	6	2	1

=== Section 1 ===
First round
(Socialist Federal Republic of Yugoslavia) N Špear	6	6
(France) J-P Courcol	4	4
(United Kingdom) R Taylor	11	6
(France) W N'Godrella	9	3
(France) M Leclercq	9	6
(France) J-B Chanfreau	7	3
(France) B Montrenaud	4	4
(Socialist Federal Republic of Yugoslavia) N Pilić	6	6

Second round
1	(Australia) T Roche	10	6
(Socialist Federal Republic of Yugoslavia) N Špear	8	3
(United Kingdom) R Taylor	3	6	6
(South Africa) C Drysdale	6	3	4
3	(Netherlands) T Okker	6	6
(France) M Leclercq	2	2
(Socialist Federal Republic of Yugoslavia) N Pilić	1	4
(Romania) I Țiriac	6	6

Quarterfinals
1	(Australia) T Roche	6	14
(United Kingdom) R Taylor	4	12
3	(Netherlands) T Okker	6	6
(Romania) I Țiriac	2	2

Semifinals
1	(Australia) T Roche	2	3	3
3	(Netherlands) T Okker	6	6	6

=== Section 2 ===
First round
(France) P Barthès	6	6
(France) J-L Rouyer	2	4
(Australia) O Davidson	3	6	6
(France) J-C Barclay	6	1	3
(South Africa) R Moore	6	7
(France) B Paul	4	5
(France) P Proisy	5	8
(France) P Beust	7	10

Second round
(Romania) I Năstase	7	6	3
(France) P Barthès	9	4	6
(Australia) O Davidson	6	5	9
4	(United States) B Buchholz	3	7	11
(United States) M Riessen	6	6
(South Africa) R Moore	4	3
(France) P Beust	2	3
2	(Australia) J Newcombe	6	6

Quarterfinals
(France) P Barthès	6	3	4
4	(United States) B Buchholz	3	6	6
(United States) M Riessen	5	11	6
2	(Australia) J Newcombe	7	9	3

Semifinals
4	(United States) B Buchholz	9	6	4	6
(United States) M Riessen	7	1	6	3
