= 1970 Paris Open =

1979 men's Grand Prix tennis tournament

- Date: 9–15 November
- Edition: 2nd
- Category: Grand Prix
- Draw: 32S / 16D
- Prize money: $31,0000
- Surface: Carpet / indoor
- Location: Paris, France
- Venue: Palais Omnisports

Champions

Singles
- (United States) Arthur Ashe

Doubles
- (United States) Pancho Gonzales / (Australia) Ken Rosewall
← 1969 ·	Paris Open	· 1972 →

The 1970 Paris Open Indoor Championships was a men's Grand Prix tennis tournament played on indoor carpet courts. It was the 2nd edition of the Paris Open (later known as the Paris Masters). It took place at the Palais omnisports de Paris-Bercy in Paris, France, and ran from 9 November through 15 November 1970.

The singles event was won by third-seeded Arthur Ashe.

== Finals ==
=== Singles ===
(United States) Arthur Ashe defeated (United States) Marty Riessen 7–6, 6–4, 6–3

- It was Ashe's 5th title of the year and the 7th of his career.

=== Doubles ===
(United States) Pancho Gonzales / (Australia) Ken Rosewall defeated (Netherlands) Tom Okker / (United States) Marty Riessen 6–4, 7–6, 7–6
