= 1974 Jean Becker Open – Doubles =

Doubles
- 1974 Jean Becker Open
- 1973 Champions: (Spain) Juan Gisbert, Sr. (Romania) Ilie Năstase

Final
- Champions: (France) Patrice Dominguez (France) François Jauffret
- Runners-up: (United States) Brian Gottfried (Mexico) Raúl Ramírez
- Score: 7–5, 6–4

Details
- Draw: 16
- Seeds: 4

Events
Singles	Doubles
- Paris Masters

== Seeds ==
Champion seeds are indicated in bold text while text in italics indicates the round in which those seeds were eliminated.

1. (Chile) Patricio Cornejo / (Chile) Jaime Fillol (quarterfinals)
2. (United States) Brian Gottfried / (Mexico) Raúl Ramírez (final)
3. (India) Anand Amritraj / (India) Vijay Amritraj (quarterfinals)
4. (United States) Charlie Pasarell / (United States) Erik van Dillen (first round)

== Draw ==
Key

- Q = Qualifier
- WC = Wild card
- LL = Lucky loser
- Alt = Alternate
- ITF = ITF entry
- PR = Protected ranking
- SR = Special ranking
- SE = Special exempt
- JE = Junior exempt
- JR = Junior Accelerator Programme entrant
- CO = College Accelerator Programme entrant
- NG = Next Gen Accelerator Program entrant
- w/o = Walkover
- r = Retired
- d = Defaulted

First round
1	(Chile) **P Cornejo** (Chile) **J Fillol**	**6**	**6**
(Argentina) J Ganzábal (Australia) B Phillips-Moore	4	0
(United States) **E Dibbs** (United States) **H Solomon**	**9**	**6**
(United States) A Ashe (Argentina) G Vilas	8	4
3	(India) **A Amritraj** (India) **V Amritraj**	**6**	5	**6**
(United States) J Borowiak (Rhodesia) C Dowdeswell	3	**7**	3
(France) **P Dominguez** (France) **F Jauffret**	**6**	**6**
(France) E Deblicker (United States) J Holladay	4	2
(United States) **P Gerken** (United States) **S Krulevitz**	**9**	**9**
(Brazil) J E Mandarino (France) P Proisy	7	8
(France) **P Beust** (France) **D Contet**	**6**	**6**
4	(United States) C Pasarell (United States) E van Dillen	2	2
(France) **J-P Meyer** (France) **W N'Godrella**	4	**9**	**6**
(Brazil) T Koch (Brazil) L F Tavares	**6**	7	4
(France) P Hagelauer (France) J-L Haillet	3	5
2	(United States) **B Gottfried** (Mexico) **R Ramírez**	**6**	**7**

Quarterfinals
1	(Chile) P Cornejo (Chile) J Fillol
(United States) **E Dibbs** (United States) **H Solomon**
3	(India) A Amritraj (India) V Amritraj	4	**8**	3
(France) **P Dominguez** (France) **F Jauffret**	**6**	6	**6**
(United States) P Gerken (United States) S Krulevitz	3	2
(France) **P Beust** (France) **D Contet**	**6**	**6**
(France) J-P Meyer (France) W N'Godrella	**6**	1	2
2	(United States) **B Gottfried** (Mexico) **R Ramírez**	3	**6**	**6**

Semifinals
(United States) E Dibbs (United States) H Solomon	1	3
(France) **P Dominguez** (France) **F Jauffret**	**6**	**6**
(France) P Beust (France) D Contet	**6**	3	1
2	(United States) **B Gottfried** (Mexico) **R Ramírez**	4	**6**	**6**

Final
(France) **Patrice Dominguez** (France) **François Jauffret**	**7**	**6**
2	(United States) Brian Gottfried (Mexico) Raúl Ramírez	5	4
