= 1977 Jean Becker Open =

- Date: 31 October – 6 November
- Edition: 8th
- Category: Grand Prix (1 star)
- Draw: 32S / 16D
- Prize money: $50,000
- Surface: Carpet / indoor
- Location: Paris, France
- Venue: Palais omnisports de Paris-Bercy

Champions

Singles
- (Italy) Corrado Barazzutti

Doubles
- (United States) Brian Gottfried / (Mexico) Raúl Ramírez
- Paris Masters

The 1977 Jean Becker Open, also known as the Paris Open, was a men's tennis tournament played on indoor carpet courts that was part of the 1977 Grand Prix circuit. It was the 8th edition of the Paris Open (later known as the Paris Masters). It took place at the Palais omnisports de Paris-Bercy in Paris, France from 31 October 1977 through 6 November 1977. Corrado Barazzutti won the singles title.

== Finals ==
=== Singles ===
(Italy) Corrado Barazzutti defeated (United States) Brian Gottfried 7–6, 7–6, 6–7, 3–6, 6–4

- It was Barazzutti's 3rd title of the year and the 4th of his career.

=== Doubles ===
(United States) Brian Gottfried / (Mexico) Raúl Ramírez defeated (United States) Jeff Borowiak / (United Kingdom) Roger Taylor 6–2, 6–0

- It was Gottfried's 10th title of the year and the 48th of his career. It was Ramirez's 8th title of the year and the 55th of his career.
