= Tony Lloyd (tennis) =

British tennis player

- Full name: Anthony Lloyd
- Country (sports): United Kingdom
- Born: 3 December 1956 (age 69) Leigh-on-Sea, Essex

Singles
- Career record: 1–2
- Career titles: 0

Grand Slam singles results
- Wimbledon: 1R (1977)

Doubles
- Career record: 8–8
- Career titles: 0

Grand Slam doubles results
- Wimbledon: 3R (1979, 1980)

Anthony Lloyd (born 3 December 1956) is a British former professional tennis player.

== Biography ==
Lloyd is the youngest of three brothers who played tennis at the top level. Two brothers, David Lloyd and John Lloyd, represented Great Britain in the Davis Cup. All three appeared in the main singles draw of the 1977 Wimbledon Championships, which was Tony's only Grand Slam appearance in singles. Given a wild card into the main draw, Lloyd was defeated in the first round by John Alexander.

More noted as a doubles player, he often partnered with his brother John. The pair were runners-up at the 1979 Paris Open, an indoor Grand Prix tournament, and twice made the third round of the Wimbledon Championships, in 1979 and 1980. During their run in 1979 they defeated number two seeds Wojtek Fibak and Tom Okker.

== Grand Prix career finals ==
=== Doubles: 1 (0–1) ===
Result	W-L	Date	Tournament	Surface	Partner	Opponents	Score
Loss	0–1	Nov 1979	Paris, France	Hard	(United Kingdom) John Lloyd	(France) Jean-Louis Haillet (France) Gilles Moretton	6–7, 6–7
