= Chris Sylvan =

American tennis player

- Full name: Christopher Sylvan
- Country (sports): United States
- Born: March 18, 1955 (age 71) Englewood, New Jersey, U.S.

Singles
- Career record: 3–6
- Highest ranking: No. 203 (July 12, 1978)

Grand Slam singles results
- Australian Open: 1R (1977 Dec)

Doubles
- Career record: 5–16

Grand Slam doubles results
- Australian Open: 2R (1977 Dec)
- US Open: 1R (1978)

Christopher Sylvan (born March 18, 1955) is an American former professional tennis player.

Sylvan, born in New Jersey, was noted for his big serve and played collegiate tennis for UC Berkeley before joining the professional tour. In November 1977 he was a quarter-finalist at the Paris Open, with wins over Barry Phillips-Moore and Ove Nils Bengtson, then in December qualified for the main draw of the Australian Open. His career high singles ranking of 203 was attained in 1978.

== Challenger titles ==
=== Doubles: (1) ===
| No. | Date | Tournament | Surface | Partner | Opponent | Score |
|---|---|---|---|---|---|---|
| 1. | July, 1978 | Raleigh, U.S. | Clay | (Paraguay) Francisco González | (United States) Bill Csipkay (United States) John Sadri | 6–2, 3–6, 6–3 |

== Personal life ==
Sylvan raised two children with wife Charlotte and lives in Fresno, California.
