= 1973 Jean Becker Open =

- Date: 29 October – 4 November
- Edition: 4th
- Category: Grand Prix (B)
- Draw: 48S / 23D
- Prize money: $50,000
- Surface: Hard / indoor
- Location: Paris, France
- Venue: Palais omnisports de Paris-Bercy

Champions

Singles
- (Romania) Ilie Năstase

Doubles
- (Spain) Juan Gisbert Sr. / (Romania) Ilie Năstase
- Paris Open

The 1973 Jean Becker Open, also known as Paris Open, was a men's Grand Prix tennis tournament played on indoor hard courts. It was the 4th edition of the Paris Open (later known as the Paris Masters). It took place at the Palais omnisports de Paris-Bercy in Paris, France, from 29 October until 4 November 1973. Ilie Năstase won the singles title.

== Finals ==
=== Singles ===
(Romania) Ilie Năstase defeated (United States) Stan Smith 4–6, 6–1, 3–6, 6–0, 6–2

- It was Nastase's 14th singles title of the year and the 36th of his career.

=== Doubles ===
(Spain) Juan Gisbert Sr. / (Romania) Ilie Năstase defeated (United States) Arthur Ashe / (United States) Roscoe Tanner 6–2, 4–6, 7–5

- It was Gisbert Sr.'s 3rd title of the year and the 9th of his career. It was Nastase's 23rd title of the year and the 57th of his career.
