= Paris Masters =

Annual tennis tournament in Paris, France

Coordinates: 48.838°N 2.378°E

- 2026 Rolex Paris Masters

ATP Tour
- Founded: 1969; 57 years ago
- Editions: 54 (2026)
- Location: Nanterre; France
- Venue: Stade Pierre de Coubertin (1969–1982); Accor Arena (1986–2024); La Défense Arena (2025–)
- Category: ATP 1000
- Surface: Carpet (indoor) (1969–1970, 1986–2006); Hard (indoor) (1972–1982, 2007–)
- Draw: 56S / 28Q / 24D
- Prize money: €6,309,095 (2026)
- Website: rolexparismasters.com

Current champions (2026)
- Singles: (Spain) Carlos Alcaraz
- Doubles: (France) Quentin Halys (France) Pierre-Hugues Herbert

The Paris Masters, known as the Rolex Paris Masters for sponsorship reasons (formerly the BNP Paribas Masters, Paris Open), is an annual indoor tennis tournament for male professional players held in Nanterre, France, a western suburb of Paris, at La Défense Arena, and is held in early November. It is part of the ATP Masters 1000 events on the Association of Tennis Professionals (ATP) Tour. The tournament evolved from the French Covered Court Championships. Beginning with the Open Era, it was held at the Stade Pierre de Coubertin until 1982. In 1989 it was upgraded to the Grand Prix Tour (Grand Prix Super Series). The event is usually the final tournament on the calendar before the season-ending ATP Finals. For sponsorship reasons, the event was officially known from 2003 to 2016 as BNP Paribas Masters, and from 2017 has been called the Rolex Paris Masters. When it was held at Accor Arena in the Bercy neighborhood of Paris, the event was often referred to as the Paris Indoor event and as Bercy to distinguish it from the other significant tennis tournament held in Paris, the French Open, which is held outdoors in the 16th arrondissement of Paris. In 2025, the event was moved out of Bercy to the La Défense suburb west of Paris.

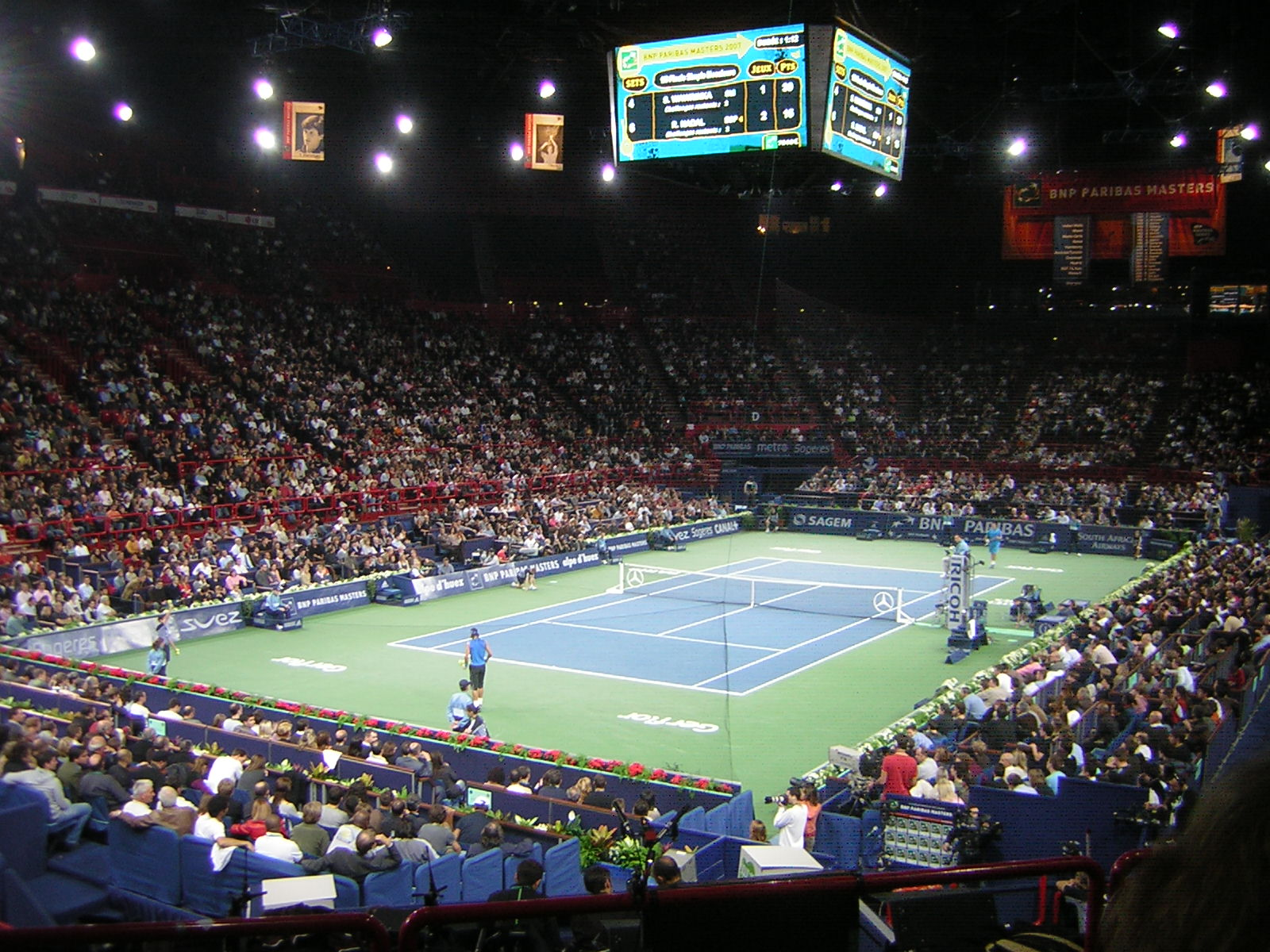
Rafael Nadal and Stan Wawrinka in Bercy (2007).

It is the last of the top nine tournaments to be held indoors. The surface used to be one of the fastest courts in the world which rewarded bold attacking tennis, but since 2011 it has followed the general slow-down of most courts on the tour. Ilie Năstase, Andre Agassi, Roger Federer, Novak Djokovic, Alexander Zverev and Carlos Alcaraz are the only singles players to have won both Parisian tournaments (Bercy and the French Open). Năstase, Agassi and Djokovic are the only three to win the double in a season, with Djokovic doing so twice. Djokovic is also the most successful singles player in the tournament's history with seven titles, and is the only player to defend the title (2013–2015).

== Past finals ==
=== Singles ===
Year	Champion	Runner-up	Score
1969	(Netherlands) Tom Okker (1/2)	(United States) Butch Buchholz	8–6, 6–2, 6–1
↓ Grand Prix circuit ↓
1970	(United States) Arthur Ashe (1/1)	(United States) Marty Riessen	7–6, 6–4, 6–3
1971	Not held		
1972	(United States) Stan Smith (1/1)	(Spain) Andrés Gimeno	6–2, 6–2, 7–5
1973	(Romania) Ilie Năstase (1/1)	(United States) Stan Smith	4–6, 6–1, 3–6, 6–0, 6–2
1974	(United States) Brian Gottfried (1/2)	(United States) Eddie Dibbs	6–3, 5–7, 8–6, 6–0
1975	(Netherlands) Tom Okker (2/2)	(United States) Arthur Ashe	6–3, 2–6, 6–3, 3–6, 6–4
1976	(United States) Eddie Dibbs (1/1)	(Chile) Jaime Fillol	5–7, 6–4, 6–4, 7–6
1977	(Italy) Corrado Barazzutti (1/1)	(United States) Brian Gottfried	7–6, 7–6, 6–7, 3–6, 6–4
1978	(United States) Robert Lutz (1/1)	(United States) Tom Gullikson	6–2, 6–2, 7–6
1979	(United States) Harold Solomon (1/1)	(Italy) Corrado Barazzutti	6–3, 2–6, 6–3, 6–4
1980	(United States) Brian Gottfried (2/2)	(Italy) Adriano Panatta	4–6, 6–3, 6–1, 7–6
1981	(United States) Mark Vines (1/1)	(France) Pascal Portes	6–2, 6–4, 6–3
1982	(Poland) Wojciech Fibak (1/1)	(United States) Bill Scanlon	6–2, 6–2, 6–2
1983– 1985	Not held		
1986	(West Germany) Boris Becker (1/3)	(Spain) Sergio Casal	6–4, 6–3, 7–6^{(7–3)}
1987	(United States) Tim Mayotte (1/1)	(United States) Brad Gilbert	2–6, 6–3, 7–5, 6–7^{(5–7)}, 6–3
1988	(Israel) Amos Mansdorf (1/1)	(United States) Brad Gilbert	6–3, 6–2, 6–3
1989	(West Germany) Boris Becker (2/3)	(Sweden) Stefan Edberg	6–4, 6–3, 6–3
↓ ATP Tour Masters 1000 (Note: Known as Championship Series, Single Week from 1990 till 1995, Super 9 from 1996 till 1999 and Masters Series from 2000 till 2008.) ↓
1990	(Sweden) Stefan Edberg (1/1)	(Germany) Boris Becker	3–3 (ret.)
1991	(France) Guy Forget (1/1)	(United States) Pete Sampras	7–6^{(11–9)}, 4–6, 5–7, 6–4, 6–4
1992	(Germany) Boris Becker (3/3)	(France) Guy Forget	7–6^{(7–3)}, 6–3, 3–6, 6–3
1993	(Croatia) Goran Ivanišević (1/1)	(Ukraine) Andrei Medvedev	6–4, 6–2, 7–6^{(7–2)}
1994	(United States) Andre Agassi (1/2)	(Switzerland) Marc Rosset	6–3, 6–3, 4–6, 7–5
1995	(United States) Pete Sampras (1/2)	(Germany) Boris Becker	7–6^{(7–5)}, 6–4, 6–4
1996	(Sweden) Thomas Enqvist (1/1)	(Russia) Yevgeny Kafelnikov	6–2, 6–4, 7–5
1997	(United States) Pete Sampras (2/2)	(Sweden) Jonas Björkman	6–3, 4–6, 6–3, 6–1
1998	(United Kingdom) Greg Rusedski (1/1)	(United States) Pete Sampras	6–4, 7–6^{(7–4)}, 6–3
1999	(United States) Andre Agassi (2/2)	(Russia) Marat Safin	7–6^{(7–1)}, 6–2, 4–6, 6–4
2000	(Russia) Marat Safin (1/3)	(Australia) Mark Philippoussis	3–6, 7–6^{(9–7)}, 6–4, 3–6, 7–6^{(10–8)}
2001	(France) Sébastien Grosjean (1/1)	(Russia) Yevgeny Kafelnikov	7–6^{(7–3)}, 6–1, 6–7^{(5–7)}, 6–4
2002	(Russia) Marat Safin (2/3)	(Australia) Lleyton Hewitt	7–6^{(7–4)}, 6–0, 6–4
2003	(United Kingdom) Tim Henman (1/1)	(Romania) Andrei Pavel	6–2, 7–6^{(8–6)}, 7–6^{(7–2)}
2004	(Russia) Marat Safin (3/3)	(Czech Republic) Radek Štěpánek	6–3, 7–6^{(7–5)}, 6–3
2005	(Czech Republic) Tomáš Berdych (1/1)	(Croatia) Ivan Ljubičić	6–3, 6–4, 3–6, 4–6, 6–4
2006	(Russia) Nikolay Davydenko (1/1)	(Slovakia) Dominik Hrbatý	6–1, 6–2, 6–2
2007	(Argentina) David Nalbandian (1/1)	(Spain) Rafael Nadal	6–4, 6–0
2008	(France) Jo-Wilfried Tsonga (1/1)	(Argentina) David Nalbandian	6–3, 4–6, 6–4
2009	(Serbia) Novak Djokovic (1/7)	(France) Gaël Monfils	6–2, 5–7, 7–6^{(7–3)}
2010	(Sweden) Robin Söderling (1/1)	(France) Gaël Monfils	6–1, 7–6^{(7–1)}
2011	(Switzerland) Roger Federer (1/1)	(France) Jo-Wilfried Tsonga	6–1, 7–6^{(7–3)}
2012	(Spain) David Ferrer (1/1)	(Poland) Jerzy Janowicz	6–4, 6–3
2013	(Serbia) Novak Djokovic (2/7)	(Spain) David Ferrer	7–5, 7–5
2014	(Serbia) Novak Djokovic (3/7)	(Canada) Milos Raonic	6–2, 6–3
2015	(Serbia) Novak Djokovic (4/7)	(United Kingdom) Andy Murray	6–2, 6–4
2016	(United Kingdom) Andy Murray (1/1)	(United States) John Isner	6–3, 6–7^{(4–7)}, 6–4
2017	(United States) Jack Sock (1/1)	(Serbia) Filip Krajinović	5–7, 6–4, 6–1
2018	(Russia) Karen Khachanov (1/1)	(Serbia) Novak Djokovic	7–5, 6–4
2019	(Serbia) Novak Djokovic (5/7)	(Canada) Denis Shapovalov	6–3, 6–4
2020	(Russia) Daniil Medvedev (1/1)	(Germany) Alexander Zverev	5–7, 6–4, 6–1
2021	(Serbia) Novak Djokovic (6/7)	(Russia) Daniil Medvedev	4–6, 6–3, 6–3
2022	(Denmark) Holger Rune (1/1)	(Serbia) Novak Djokovic	3–6, 6–3, 7–5
2023	(Serbia) Novak Djokovic (7/7)	(Bulgaria) Grigor Dimitrov	6–4, 6–3
2024	(Germany) Alexander Zverev (1/1)	(France) Ugo Humbert	6–2, 6–2
2025	(Italy) Jannik Sinner (1/1)	(Canada) Félix Auger-Aliassime	6–4, 7–6^{(7–4)}
2026	(Spain) Carlos Alcaraz (1/1)	(United States) Ben Shelton	7−6^{(7−5)}, 7−5

=== Doubles ===
Year	Champions	Runners-up	Score
1969	(Australia) John Newcombe (Australia) Tony Roche	(Netherlands) Tom Okker (United States) Marty Riessen	10–8, 6–4, 6–2
↓ Grand Prix circuit ↓
1970	(United States) Pancho Gonzales (Australia) Ken Rosewall	(Netherlands) Tom Okker (United States) Marty Riessen	6–4, 7–6, 7–6
1971	Not held		
1972	(France) Pierre Barthès (France) François Jauffret	(Spain) Andrés Gimeno (Spain) Juan Gisbert	6–3, 6–2
1973	(Spain) Juan Gisbert (Romania) Ilie Năstase	(United States) Arthur Ashe (United States) Roscoe Tanner	6–2, 4–6, 7–5
1974	(France) Patrice Dominguez (France) François Jauffret (2)	(United States) Brian Gottfried (Mexico) Raúl Ramírez	7–5, 6–4
1975	(Poland) Wojtek Fibak (West Germany) Karl Meiler	(Romania) Ilie Năstase (Netherlands) Tom Okker	6–4, 7–6
1976	(Netherlands) Tom Okker (United States) Marty Riessen	(United States) Fred McNair (United States) Sherwood Stewart	6–2, 6–2
1977	(United States) Brian Gottfried (Mexico) Raúl Ramírez	(United States) Jeff Borowiak (United Kingdom) Roger Taylor	6–2, 6–0
1978	(United States) Bruce Manson (Rhodesia) Andrew Pattison	(Romania) Ion Țiriac (Argentina) Guillermo Vilas	7–6, 6–2
1979	(France) Jean-Louis Haillet (France) Gilles Moretton	(United Kingdom) John Lloyd (United Kingdom) Tony Lloyd	7–6, 7–6
1980	(Italy) Paolo Bertolucci (Italy) Adriano Panatta	(United States) Brian Gottfried (South Africa) Raymond Moore	6–4, 6–4
1981	(Romania) Ilie Năstase (France) Yannick Noah	(United Kingdom) Andrew Jarrett (United Kingdom) Jonathan Smith	6–4, 6–4
1982	(United States) Brian Gottfried (2) (United States) Bruce Manson (2)	(United States) Jay Lapidus (United States) Richard Meyer	6–4, 6–2
1983– 1985	Not held		
1986	(United States) Peter Fleming (United States) John McEnroe	(Iran) Mansour Bahrami (Uruguay) Diego Pérez	6–3, 6–2
1987	(Switzerland) Jakob Hlasek (Switzerland) Claudio Mezzadri	(United States) Scott Davis (United States) David Pate	7–6, 6–2
1988	(United States) Paul Annacone (Australia) John Fitzgerald	(United States) Jim Grabb (South Africa) Christo van Rensburg	6–2, 6–2
1989	(Australia) John Fitzgerald (2) (Sweden) Anders Järryd	(Switzerland) Jakob Hlasek (France) Éric Winogradsky	7–6, 6–4
↓ ATP Tour Masters 1000 ↓
1990	(United States) Scott Davis (United States) David Pate	(Australia) Darren Cahill (Australia) Mark Kratzmann	5–7, 6–3, 6–4
1991	(Australia) John Fitzgerald (3) (Sweden) Anders Järryd (2)	(United States) Kelly Jones (United States) Rick Leach	3–6, 6–3, 6–2
1992	(United States) John McEnroe (2) (United States) Patrick McEnroe	(United States) Patrick Galbraith (South Africa) Danie Visser	6–4, 6–2
1993	(Zimbabwe) Byron Black (United States) Jonathan Stark	(Netherlands) Tom Nijssen (Czech Republic) Cyril Suk	4–6, 7–5, 6–2
1994	(Netherlands) Jacco Eltingh (Netherlands) Paul Haarhuis	(Zimbabwe) Byron Black (United States) Jonathan Stark	3–6, 7–6, 7–5
1995	(Canada) Grant Connell (United States) Patrick Galbraith	(United States) Jim Grabb (United States) Todd Martin	6–2, 6–2
1996	(Netherlands) Jacco Eltingh (2) (Netherlands) Paul Haarhuis (2)	(Russia) Yevgeny Kafelnikov (Czech Republic) Daniel Vacek	6–4, 4–6, 7–6
1997	(Netherlands) Jacco Eltingh (3) (Netherlands) Paul Haarhuis (3)	(United States) Rick Leach (United States) Jonathan Stark	6–2, 7–6
1998	(India) Mahesh Bhupathi (India) Leander Paes	(Netherlands) Jacco Eltingh (Netherlands) Paul Haarhuis	6–4, 6–2
1999	(Canada) Sébastien Lareau (United States) Alex O'Brien	(Netherlands) Paul Haarhuis (United States) Jared Palmer	7–6^{(9–7)}, 7–5
2000	(Sweden) Nicklas Kulti (Belarus) Max Mirnyi	(Netherlands) Paul Haarhuis (Canada) Daniel Nestor	6–4, 7–5
2001	(South Africa) Ellis Ferreira (United States) Rick Leach	(India) Mahesh Bhupathi (India) Leander Paes	3–6, 6–4, 6–3
2002	(France) Nicolas Escudé (France) Fabrice Santoro	(Brazil) Gustavo Kuerten (France) Cédric Pioline	6–3, 7–6^{(8–6)}
2003	(Australia) Wayne Arthurs (Australia) Paul Hanley	(France) Michaël Llodra (France) Fabrice Santoro	6–3, 1–6, 6–3
2004	(Sweden) Jonas Björkman (Australia) Todd Woodbridge	(Zimbabwe) Wayne Black (Zimbabwe) Kevin Ullyett	6–3, 6–4
2005	(United States) Bob Bryan (United States) Mike Bryan	(The Bahamas) Mark Knowles (Canada) Daniel Nestor	6–4, 6–7^{(3–7)}, 6–4
2006	(France) Arnaud Clément (France) Michaël Llodra	(France) Fabrice Santoro (Serbia and Montenegro) Nenad Zimonjić	7–6^{(7–4)}, 6–2
2007	(United States) Bob Bryan (2) (United States) Mike Bryan (2)	(Canada) Daniel Nestor (Serbia) Nenad Zimonjić	6–3, 7–6^{(7–4)}
2008	(Sweden) Jonas Björkman (2) (Zimbabwe) Kevin Ullyett	(South Africa) Jeff Coetzee (South Africa) Wesley Moodie	6–2, 6–2
2009	(Canada) Daniel Nestor (Serbia) Nenad Zimonjić	(Spain) Marcel Granollers (Spain) Tommy Robredo	6–3, 6–4
2010	(India) Mahesh Bhupathi (2) (Belarus) Max Mirnyi (2)	(The Bahamas) Mark Knowles (Israel) Andy Ram	7–5, 7–5
2011	(India) Rohan Bopanna (Pakistan) Aisam-ul-Haq Qureshi	(France) Julien Benneteau (France) Nicolas Mahut	6–2, 6–4
2012	(India) Mahesh Bhupathi (3) (India) Rohan Bopanna (2)	(Pakistan) Aisam-ul-Haq Qureshi (Netherlands) Jean-Julien Rojer	7–6^{(8–6)}, 6–3
2013	(United States) Bob Bryan (3) (United States) Mike Bryan (3)	(Austria) Alexander Peya (Brazil) Bruno Soares	6–3, 6–3
2014	(United States) Bob Bryan (4) (United States) Mike Bryan (4)	(Poland) Marcin Matkowski (Austria) Jürgen Melzer	7–6^{(7–5)}, 5–7, [10–6]
2015	(Croatia) Ivan Dodig (Brazil) Marcelo Melo	(Canada) Vasek Pospisil (United States) Jack Sock	2–6, 6–3, [10–5]
2016	(Finland) Henri Kontinen (Australia) John Peers	(France) Pierre-Hugues Herbert (France) Nicolas Mahut	6–4, 3–6, [10–6]
2017	(Poland) Łukasz Kubot (Brazil) Marcelo Melo (2)	(Croatia) Ivan Dodig (Spain) Marcel Granollers	7–6^{(7–3)}, 3–6, [10–6]
2018	(Spain) Marcel Granollers (United States) Rajeev Ram	(Netherlands) Jean-Julien Rojer (Romania) Horia Tecău	6–4, 6–4
2019	(France) Pierre-Hugues Herbert (France) Nicolas Mahut	(Russia) Karen Khachanov (Russia) Andrey Rublev	6–4, 6–1
2020	(Canada) Félix Auger-Aliassime (Poland) Hubert Hurkacz	(Croatia) Mate Pavić (Brazil) Bruno Soares	6–7^{(3–7)}, 7–6^{(9–7)}, [10–2]
2021	(Germany) Tim Pütz (New Zealand) Michael Venus	(France) Pierre-Hugues Herbert (France) Nicolas Mahut	6–3, 6–7^{(4–7)}, [11–9]
2022	(United Kingdom) Neal Skupski (Netherlands) Wesley Koolhof	(United States) Austin Krajicek (Croatia) Ivan Dodig	7–6^{(7–5)}, 6–4
2023	(Mexico) Santiago González (France) Édouard Roger-Vasselin	(India) Rohan Bopanna (Australia) Matthew Ebden	6–2, 5–7, [10–7]
2024	(Netherlands) Wesley Koolhof (2) (Croatia) Nikola Mektić	(United Kingdom) Lloyd Glasspool (Czech Republic) Adam Pavlásek	3–6, 6–3, [10–5]
2025	(Finland) Harri Heliövaara (United Kingdom) Henry Patten	(United Kingdom) Julian Cash (United Kingdom) Lloyd Glasspool	6–3, 6–4
2026	(France) Quentin Halys (France) Pierre-Hugues Herbert (2)	(United States) Christian Harrison (United Kingdom) Neal Skupski	7–6^{(7–3)}, 6–7^{(4–7)}, [10–8]

== Records ==
=== Singles ===
Most titles	(Serbia) Novak Djokovic	7
Most finals	(Serbia) Novak Djokovic	9
Most consecutive titles	(Serbia) Novak Djokovic (2013, 2014, 2015)	3
Most consecutive finals	(Serbia) Novak Djokovic (2013, 2014, 2015) (2021, 2022, 2023)	3
Most matches played	(Serbia) Novak Djokovic	61
Most matches won	(Serbia) Novak Djokovic	51
Most consecutive matches won	(Serbia) Novak Djokovic 2013 (5), 2014 (5), 2015 (5), 2016 (2)	17
Most editions played	(Serbia) Novak Djokovic	18

=== Doubles ===
Most titles	(United States) Bob Bryan (United States) Mike Bryan	4
Most finals	(Netherlands) Paul Haarhuis (Note: Haarhuis reached these finals with three different partners.)	6
Most consecutive titles	(Netherlands) Jacco Eltingh (Netherlands) Paul Haarhuis (1996, 1997)	2
Most consecutive titles	(United States) Bob Bryan (United States) Mike Bryan (2013, 2014)	2

== See also ==
- French Covered Court Championships – predecessor to Paris Masters
- Clarins Open
