= Jean-Louis Haillet =

French tennis player (born 1954)

- Country (sports): France
- Born: 7 May 1954 (age 72) Nice, France
- Plays: Right-handed

Singles
- Career record: 48–93
- Highest ranking: No. 68 (10 March 1980)

Grand Slam singles results
- Australian Open: 2R (1973)
- French Open: 2R (1973, 1976)
- Wimbledon: 1R (1973)
- US Open: 1R (1976)

Doubles
- Career record: 52–76
- Career titles: 2
- Highest ranking: No. 45 (3 January 1979)

Grand Slam doubles results
- Australian Open: 3R (1974)
- French Open: 2R (1978, 1979, 1980)
- Wimbledon: 1R (1974, 1975)
- US Open: 1R (1976)

Jean-Louis Haillet (French: [ʒɑ̃ lwi ajɛ]; born 7 May 1954) is a former professional tennis player from France.

Haillet enjoyed most of his tennis success while playing doubles. During his career he won two doubles titles.

He is the son of Robert Haillet who was a professional tennis player before the Open Era.

== Career finals ==
=== Doubles: 9 (2 titles / 7 runner-ups) ===
| Result | W/L | Date | Tournament | Surface | Partner | Opponents | Score |
|---|---|---|---|---|---|---|---|
| Loss | 0–1 | Jul 1977 | Båstad, Sweden | Clay | (France) François Jauffret | (Australia) Mark Edmondson (Australia) John Marks | 4–6, 0–6 |
| Loss | 0–2 | Jul 1977 | Hilversum, Netherlands | Clay | (France) François Jauffret | (Spain) José Higueras (Spain) Antonio Muñoz | 1–6, 4–6, 6–2, 1–6 |
| Win | 1–2 | Jun 1978 | Brussels, Belgium | Clay | (Italy) Antonio Zugarelli | (New Zealand) Onny Parun (Czechoslovakia) Vladimír Zedník | 6–3, 4–6, 7–5 |
| Loss | 1–3 | Oct 1978 | Barcelona, Spain | Clay | (France) Gilles Moretton | (Socialist Federal Republic of Yugoslavia) Željko Franulović (Chile) Hans Gildemeister | 1–6, 4–6 |
| Loss | 1–4 | Nov 1978 | Bologna, Italy | Carpet | (Italy) Antonio Zugarelli | (United States) Peter Fleming (United States) John McEnroe | 1–6, 4–6 |
| Loss | 1–5 | May 1979 | Munich, Germany | Clay | (West Germany) Jürgen Fassbender | (Poland) Wojciech Fibak (Netherlands) Tom Okker | 6–7, 5–7 |
| Win | 2–5 | Nov 1979 | Paris Indoor, France | Hard (i) | (France) Gilles Moretton | (United Kingdom) John Lloyd (United Kingdom) Tony Lloyd | 7–6, 7–6 |
| Loss | 2–6 | Dec 1982 | Toulouse, France | Hard (i) | (France) Yannick Noah | (Czechoslovakia) Pavel Složil (Czechoslovakia) Tomáš Šmíd | 4–6, 4–6 |
| Loss | 2–7 | Mar 1983 | Nice, France | Clay | (France) Bernard Fritz | (Belgium) Bernard Boileau (Czechoslovakia) Libor Pimek | 3–6, 4–6 |
